= Anne =

Given name, predominantly female (see details in article)

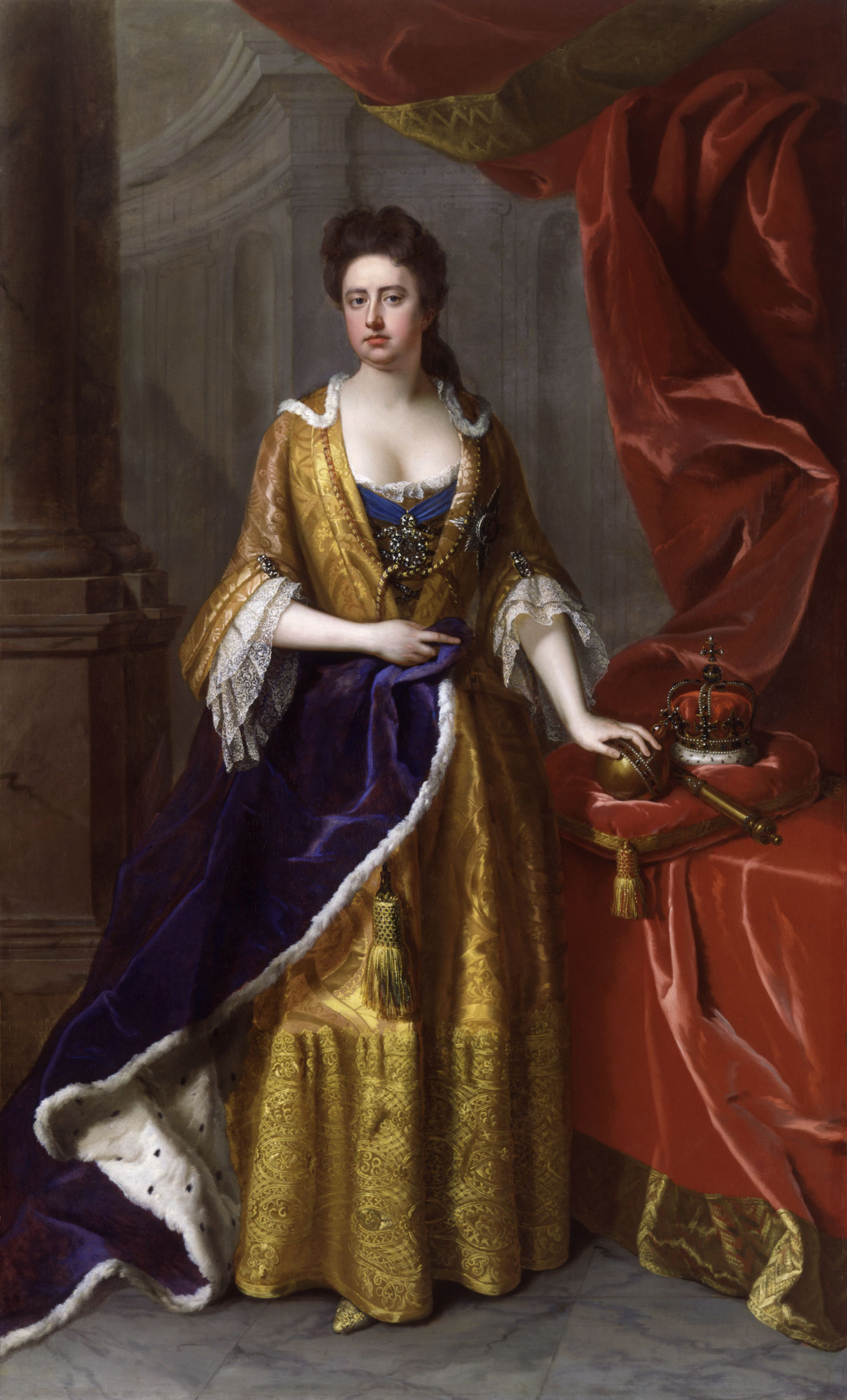
- Anne, Queen of Great Britain
- Pronunciation: English: /æn/ French: [an]
- Gender: Feminine
- Language: English, French

Origin
- Language: Latin
- Derivation: Hebrew
- Meaning: 'favored, grace'

Other names
- Variant form: Ann
- See also: Anna, Ana, Annie, Nancy, Nanette, Ninon

Anne, alternatively spelled Ann, is a form of the Latin female name Anna. This in turn is a representation of the Hebrew Hannah, which means 'favour' or 'grace'. Related names include Annie and Ana.

Anne is sometimes used as a male name in the Netherlands, particularly in the Frisian speaking part (for example, author Anne de Vries). In this incarnation, it is related to Germanic arn-names and means 'eagle'. It has also been used for males in France (Anne de Montmorency) and Scotland (Lord Anne Hamilton). In Ireland the name is used as an anglicized version of Áine.

In Japan, Anne is written as 安音, 安嶺, 安寧, etc. (あんね) pronounced [anoneꜜ]. It could have various origins.

== As a feminine name ==
=== Anne ===
- Saint Anne, Mother of the Virgin Mary
- Anne, Queen of Great Britain (1665–1714), Queen of England, Scotland, and Ireland (1702–07) and Great Britain (1707–14)
- Queens consort, in chronological order:
  - Anne of Austria, Landgravine of Thuringia (1432–1462)
  - Anne Neville (1456–1485), wife of King Richard III of England
  - Anne of Brittany (1477–1514), Breton ruler, wife of both Charles VIII of France and Louis XII of France
  - Anne Boleyn (c. 1501/1507–1536), second wife of King Henry VIII of England
  - Anne of Cleves (1515–1557), fourth wife of King Henry VIII
  - Anne of Denmark (1574–1619), wife of King James VI and I of Scotland, England, and Ireland,
  - Anne of Austria (1601–1666), wife of Louis XIII of France, Regent of France
  - Anne Catherine of Brandenburg (1575–1612), wife of King Christian IV of Denmark and Norway
  - Anne Marie d'Orléans (1669–1728), wife of King Victor Amadeus II of Sardinia
  - Anne of Romania (1923–2016), wife of King Michael I of Romania
  - Anne-Marie of Greece (born 1948), Queen of Greece, wife of King Constantine II
- Princess Anne (disambiguation), including:
  - Anne of Denmark, Electress of Saxony (1532–1585), Danish princess from the House of Oldenburg
  - Anne, Princess Royal and Princess of Orange (1709–1759), daughter of King George II, wife of William IV, Prince of Orange
  - Anne of Orléans (1906–1986), Princess of France
  - Anne of Bourbon-Two Sicilies (born 1938), wife of Infante Carlos, Duke of Calabria
  - Anne, Princess Royal (born 1950), daughter of Queen Elizabeth II
- Anne van Aaken (born 1969), German lawyer and economist
- Anne Aallonen (born 1967), Finnish-born Hong Kong professional tennis player
- Anne Aanestad Winter, Norwegian handball player
- Anne Aaron, Filipina engineer
- Anne Aaserud (1942–2017), Norwegian art historian and museum director
- Anne Aasheim (1962–2016), Norwegian editor
- Anne Abayasekara (1925–2015), Sri Lankan Sinhala journalist
- Anne Abeillé (born 1962), French linguist
- Anne Abeja Muhwezi, Ugandan lawyer and corporate executive
- Anne Abernathy (born 1953), American sportswoman
- Anne-Ségolène Abscheidt, French professor
- Anne Acheson (1882–1962), Irish sculptor
- Anne Adams (born 1960), British swimmer
- Anne-christine d'Adesky, American journalist and activist
- Anne Lise Ådnøy (born 1957), Norwegian bishop
- Anne Aghion (born 1960), French-American documentary filmmaker
- Anne Agius Ferrante (1925–2023), Maltese politician
- Anne Ainsworth (born 1951), Namibian lawn bowls competitor
- Anne Åkerblom (born 1960), Finnish judoka
- Anne-Birgitte Albrectsen (born 1967), Danish lawyer
- Anne Allison, professor of cultural anthropology
- Anne X. Alpern (1903–1981), American judge
- Anne L. Alstott, American legal scholar
- Anne Alvaro (born 1951), French actress
- Anne Alvik (born 1937), Norwegian politician and civil servant
- Anne Aly (born 1967), Australian politician and academic
- Anne A. Amadi, current Chief Registrar of the Kenya Judiciary
- Anne-Lisa Amadou (1930–2002), Norwegian literary researcher
- Anne Amie, Indian playback singer
- Anne van Amstel (born 1974), Dutch writer
- Anne Amuzu, Ghanaian computer scientist
- Anne Anastasi (1908–2001), American psychologist
- Anne Ancelin Schützenberger (1919–2018), French psychotherapist
- Anne André-Léonard (born 1948), Belgian politician
- Anne S. Andrew (born 1955), American attorney and diplomat
- Anne M. Andrews, American neuroscientist
- Anne Andrieux (born 1979), French volleyball player
- Anne Anglin, Canadian actress and theatre director
- Anne Anstine (1924–1997), American politician
- Anne Applebaum (born 1964), American journalist
- Anne Appleby, American painter
- Anne Archer (born 1947), American actress
- Anne Archibald, Canadian astronomer
- Anne L. Armstrong (1927–2008), American diplomat
- Anne W. Armstrong (1872–1958), American writer
- Anne Arnold (1925–2014), American sculptor
- Anne Arrasmith (1946–2017), American artist and educator
- Anne Arundell (c.1615/1616–1649), English noblewoman
- Anne Ashworth (1842–1921), British feminist activist
- Anne Askew (1521–1546), English writer, poet, and Protestant martyr
- Anne Louise Ashley-Greenstreet (1835–1???), English hymn writer
- Anne Astin, Australian biochemist and forensic expert
- Anne Aston (born 1948), Scottish actress and television presenter
- Anne Atkins, English novelist, writer and broadcaster
- Anne Aubrey (born 1937), English actress
- Anne Audain (born 1955), New Zealand runner
- Anne Auger, French computer scientist
- Anne-Emmanuelle Augustine (born 2001), French handball player
- Anne Nafi Aussi (born 1964), Iraqi minister
- Anne Pomeroy Autor, Canadian scientist
- Anne Avantie (born 1955), Indonesian fashion designer
- Anne Sophie Avé (born 1968), French diplomat
- Anne Azéma (born 1957), American opera singer
- Anne-Laure Babault (born 1982), French politician
- Anne Bacon (1528–1610), English scholar
- Anne Luther Bagby (1859–1942), American Baptist missionary
- Anne Bahlke, American physician
- Anne-Lise Bakken (born 1952), Norwegian politician
- Anne Balay, American labor historian
- Anne de Balbi (1753–1842), French aristocrat
- Anne Balfour-Fraser (1923–2016), British film producer
- Anne Elizabeth Ball (1808–1872), Irish botanist, algologist and botanical illustrator
- Anne Balsamo (born 1959), American academic and writer
- Anne Bampton, Australian lawyer
- Anne Bancroft (1931–2005), American actress
- Anne Bankes (1759–1778), British artist
- Anne Bannerman (1765–1829), Scottish poet
- Anne Bannister (1936–2015), British child psychotherapist
- Anne Baranger, American chemist
- Anne-Lise Bardet (born 1974), French slalom canoeist and Olympic medalist
- Anne Maria Barkly (1837–1932), British botanist
- Anne Barlow, British curator
- Anne Barnard, American journalist
- Anne Henslow Barnard (1839–1899), botanical artist and scientific illustrator
- Anne Barnéoud (born 1983), French para table tennis player
- Anne Barrington (born 1953), Irish diplomat
- Anne-Sophie Barthet (born 1988), French alpine skier
- Anne Barton (1924–2000), American film and television actor
- Anne Bartsch (born 1995), German ice hockey player
- Anne Barzin (born 1975), Belgian politician
- Anne Basset, English lady-in-waiting
- Anne S. Bassett, Canadian psychiatrist
- Anne Basting, American gerontologist
- Anne K. Batten (born 1932), American politician in Vermont
- Anne Bauchens (1882–1967), American film editor
- Anne Baxter (1923–1985), American actress
- Anne Bayefsky (born 1953), Canadian academic and activist
- Anne Beale (1816–1900), English novelist and poet
- Anne Bean (born 1950), London-based performance artist
- Anne Beatts (1947–2021), American writer
- Anne Beaufour (born 1963), French billionaire heiress
- Anne-Julie Beaulieu (born 1994), Canadian badminton player
- Anne Beaumanoir (1923–2022), French neurophysiologist
- Anne Bedian (born 1972), Armenian-Canadian actress
- Anne Beechey (1764–1833), British portrait painter
- Anne Begg (born 1955), British politician
- Anne F. Beiler (born 1949), American businesswoman
- Anne Belle, documentary filmmaker
- Anne Beloff-Chain (1921–1991), English biochemist
- Anne Benjaminsen, Finnish ski-orienteering competitor
- Anne Benoît, French actress
- Anne Berest (born 1979), French writer and actress
- Anne Berge (born 1966), Norwegian alpine skier
- Anne Lilia Berge Strand (born 1977), Norwegian singer-songwriter, known as "Annie"
- Anne Sofie Berge (born 1937), Norwegian politician
- Anne Berit Eid (born 1957), Norwegian orienteer
- Anne Bermingham, Australian chemist
- Anne Bernays (born 1930), American novelist, editor and teacher
- Anne-Lise Berntsen (1943–2012), Norwegian soprano
- Anne Zohra Berrached (born 1982), German film director and screenwriter
- Anne Berthelot (born 1957), French professor of Medieval literature studies
- Anne Valentina Berthelsen (born 1994), Danish politician
- Anne Bertolotti, French neurological disease researcher
- Anne-Grethe Leine Bientie (born 1954), Norwegian writer and psalmist
- Anne Bierwirth, German contralto
- Anne Bierwisch (born 1987), German toxicologist and cricketer
- Anne Mathilde Bilbro, American composer and music educator
- Anne-Sophie Bion, French film editor
- Anne Birk (1942–2009), German author
- Anne-Sophie Bittighoffer, French tennis player
- Anne-Margrethe Björlin (1921–2007), Swedish film actress
- Anne Marit Bjørnflaten (born 1969), Norwegian politician
- Anne Blanc (born 1966), French politician
- Anne Wil Blankers (born 1940), Dutch actress
- Anne Blencowe (1656–1718), British compiler of recipes
- Anne-Laure Blin (born 1983), French politician
- Anne deBlois Smart (born 1935), Canadian politician
- Anne Bloom (born 1947), American actress
- Anne Blouin (born 1946), Canadian politician
- Anne Bobby (born 1967), American actress
- Anne Bochatay (born 1968), Swiss ski mountaineer and police officer
- Anne Boden (born 1960), British entrepreneur
- Anne Bøe (born 1956), Norwegian poet
- Anne Bogart (born 1951), American theatre and opera director
- Anne Bohnenkamp-Renken, German academic
- Anne Boileau (born 1975), French table tennis player
- Anne Boixel (born 1965), French slalom canoeist
- Anne Boleyn, queen of England from 1533 to 1536
- Anne van Bonn (born 1985), German footballer
- Anne Bonnet (1908–1960), Belgian painter
- Anne Bonny (likely died December 1733), pirate
- Anne Boquet (born 1952), French senior civil servant
- Anne de Borman (1881–1962), Belgian tennis player
- Anne Born (1924–2011), British poet, local historian, writer and translator
- Anne-Lise Børresen-Dale (born 1946), Norwegian biochemist
- Anne Borsay (1954–2014), British medical historian
- Anne Bosworth Focke (1868–1907), American mathematician
- Anne Boud'hors, French Egyptologist, Coptologist and philologist
- Anne Bourg (born 1987), Luxembourgish footballer
- Anne Bourguignon (1950–2019), French actress, filmmaker and political activist known as Anémone
- Anne Bourlioux, Canadian mathematician and indoor rower
- Anne Boutet de Monvel, French applied mathematician and mathematical physicist
- Anne Boutin (born 1968), French chemist
- Anne Bouverot (born 1966), French business executive
- Anne Bowes-Lyon (1917–1980), Danish princess by marriage
- Anne Boyd (born 1946), Australian composer
- Anne Boyer, American poet and essayist
- Anne Bracegirdle (1671–1748), British actress
- Anne Braden (1924–2006), American civil rights activist, journalist and educator
- Anne Bradstreet (1612–1672), America's first published poet
- Anne Bragance, French writer
- Anne Brancato Wood (1903–1972), American politician
- Anne-Sophie Brasme (born 1984), French writer
- Anne-Eva Brauneck (1910–2007), German law professor
- Anne Bray, American artist
- Anne Margrethe Bredal (1655–1729), Danish scholar and feminist writer
- Anne Bremer (1868–1923), American painter
- Anne Bremner (born 1958), American lawyer
- Anne Bredon (1930–2019), American folk singer
- Anne M. Brennan, American lawyer
- Anne Brenon (born 1945), French curator and historian
- Anne Briand (born 1968), French biathlete
- Anne Bricollet, French artist
- Anne Briggs (born 1944), English folk singer
- Anne Brigman (1869–1950), American photographer
- Anne Louise Brillon de Jouy (1744–1824), French musician
- Anne Brinch-Nielsen (born 1997), Danish handball player
- Anne Briscoe (1918–2014), American biochemist
- Anne Broadbent, Canadian mathematician
- Anne Brochet (born 1966), French actress
- Anne Brodbelt (1751–1827), British Jamaican letter writer and social observer
- Anne Brodsky (born 1965), American psychologist
- Anne Marinus Broeckman (1874–1946), Dutch artist
- Anne Brolly, Irish politician
- Anne Brontë (1820–1849), British novelist and poet
- Anne Rose Brooks (born 1963), American actress
- Anne Brooks, American physician
- Anne Brooksbank, Australian writer
- Änne Bruck (1907–1978), German actress
- Anne Brugnera (born 1970), French politician
- Anne de Bruin, New Zealand economics researcher
- Anne Brunell (born 1970), Australian Paralympic swimmer
- Anne-France Brunet (born 1962), French politician
- Anne Brunet, Stanford University professor of aging
- Anne Brunila (born 1957), Finnish economist
- Anne Brusletto (born 1951), Norwegian alpine skier
- Anne Bruun (1853–1934), Danish schoolteacher and women's rights activist
- Anne Bryans (1909–2004), British humanitarian and hospital governor
- Anne Brydges Lefroy (1748–1804), English writer
- Anne Walbank Buckland (1832–1899), British anthropologist and author
- Anne Bugge-Paulsen (born 1979), Norwegian footballer
- Anne Buijs (born 1991), Dutch volleyball player
- Anne Buist, Australian psychiatrist
- Anne Bulford (born 1959), British media executive
- Anne Bullar (1812–1856), English writer
- Anne Moen Bullitt (1924–2007), American socialite, philanthropist and horsebreeder
- Anne Burghardt (born 1975), Estonian theologian
- Anne Burlak (1911–2002), American labor activist
- Anne Burnaby (1922–?), British screenwriter and playwright
- Anne Pippin Burnett (1925–2017), American classical scholar and academic
- Anne-Margaretta Burr (1817–1892), English painter
- Anne Burr (1918–2003), American actress
- Anne Burras, early Virginia colonist
- Anne Burrell (1969–2025), American chef
- Anne Bushnell (1939–2011), Irish musical artist
- Anne Buttimer (1938–2017), Irish geographer
- Anne Buydens (1919–2021), American film producer and philanthropist
- Anne Isabella Byron, Baroness Byron (1792–1860), British peer, wife of Lord Byron
- Anne Byrn (born 1956), American cookbook author
- Anne Cabot Wyman (1929–2014), travel writer
- Anne des Cadeaux (died 1754), Native American woman from Louisiana
- Anne Hessing Cahn (born 1930), American political writer
- Anne Cairns (born 1981), New Zealand-Samoan canoeist
- Anne Caldwell (1867–1936), American dramatist
- Anne Sophie Callesen (born 1988), Danish politician
- Anne-Sophie Calvez (born 1983), French figure skater
- Anne Cameron (1938–2022), Canadian writer
- Anne Camm (1627–1705), English Quaker
- Anne Cannon Forsyth (1930–2003), American heiress and education activist
- Anne Canovas (born 1957), French actress
- Anne Canteaut, French cryptographic researcher
- Anne Capron (born 1969), French synchronized swimmer
- Anne de Carbuccia (born 1968), American environmental artist, photographer and film director
- Anne Carey, American film producer
- Anne Carleton (1878–1968), American painter
- Anne Carlisle (professor), Irish academics
- Anne Carlisle, American actress
- Anne Carlsen (1915–2002), American special educator
- Anne Carney, American politician and attorney
- Anne E. Carpenter, American scientist
- Anne Carroll (1940–2018), British actress and director
- Anne Carroll Moore (1871–1961), American writer and librarian
- Anne Carson (born 1950), Canadian poet, essayist, and translator
- Anne Cary (17th century), British Benedictine nun
- Anne Casabonne (born 1970), Canadian actress and politician
- Anne Casale (1930–2002), American cookbook author
- Anne Case (born 1958), American economist
- Anne Casey, British nurse and writer
- Anne Casper, American diplomat
- Anne-Laure Casseleux (born 1984), French footballer
- Anne Cassidy (born 1952), British writer
- Anne Cassin, Irish sports broadcaster
- Anne Castles, Australian cognitive scientist
- Anne-Laure Cattelot (born 1988), French politician
- Anne-Lise Caudal (born 1984), French golfer
- Lady Anne Cavendish-Bentinck (1916–2008), British noblewoman and landowner
- Anne Cawrse, Australian classical composer
- Anne Cebula, American fencer and model
- Anne Cecil (1556–1588), English nobility and writer
- Anne Chabanceau de La Barre (1628–1688), French opera singer
- Anne Chamberlain (1883–1967), wife of Neville Chamberlain
- Anne Chamney (1931–2008), British medical engineer and inventor
- Anne Chao, Taiwanese environmental statistician
- Anne H. Charity Hudley, American linguist
- Anne Charleston (born 1942), Australian actress
- Anne Charnock (born 1954), British science fiction author
- Anne Charrier (born 1974), French actress
- Anne Charton-Demeur (1824–1892), French opera singer
- Anne-Caroline Chausson (born 1977), French cyclist
- Anne Cheng (born 1955), French sinologist
- Anne Anlin Cheng, American scholar and writer
- Anne Cherkowski (born 2002), Canadian ice hockey player
- Anne Cherubim, Canadian artist
- Anne Chevalier (1912–1977), American actress
- Anne Cheynet (1938–2025), French writer
- Anne Chirnside (born 1954), Australian rower
- Anne Chislett (born 1942), Canadian playwright
- Anne Chow (born 1966), American business executive
- Anne-Mette Christensen (born 1973), Danish footballer
- Anne Churchland, American neuroscientist
- Anne Cibis (born 1985), German sprinter
- Anne Cirkel, electronic design automation industry executive
- Anne Claflin (born 1983), American politician
- Anne Cleary, video artist
- Anne Élaine Cliche (born 1959), Canadian writer
- Lady Anne Clifford (1590–1676), English peeress
- Anne Clyde (1946–2005), Australian educator and librarian
- Anne V. Coates (1925–2018), British film editor
- Anne Cobbe (1920–1971), British mathematician
- Anne Cobden-Sanderson (1853–1926), English socialist and suffragette
- Anne Cochran, American singer
- Anne Cochrane (1855–1943), British courtier
- Anne Cocker (1920–2014), Scottish rose hybridizer
- Anne Coesens (born 1966), Belgian actress
- Anne Cohen (born 1941), Australian politician
- Anne Coke, Viscountess Anson, English painter and aristocrat
- Anne Coldiron, American humanities scholar, university professor and author
- Anne Colgan, Irish camogie player
- Anne Cathrine Collett (1768–1846), Norwegian-Danish landowner
- Anne-Hyacinthe de Colleville (1761–1824), French novelist and dramatist
- Anne Colley (born 1951), Irish politician
- Anne Collier, American visual artist
- Anne Félicité Colombe, French printer and political activist
- Anne Comi, American pediatric neurologist
- Anne Commire (1939–2012), American playwright and editor
- Anne Compton, Canadian poet, critic and anthologist
- Anne Condon, Irish-Canadian computer scientist
- Anne Conlon (1939–1979), Australian feminist, public servant and labour activist
- Anne Consigny (born 1963), French actress
- Anne Cooke (born 1945), British biologist
- Anne Cooke Reid (1907–1997), African-American stage director and academic
- Anne Cools (born 1943), Canadian senator
- Anne Sheldon Coombs, American novelist
- Anne Copp, American politician
- Anne Corn, American educator, author, researcher and advocate
- Anne Corner, British political activist and writer
- Anne Cornwall (1897–1980), American actress
- Anne Cornwallis (died 1635), English Roman Catholic benefactor and one time supposed author
- Anne-Lise Coste (born 1973), French painter
- Anne-Claire Coudray (born 1977), French journalist and television presenter
- Anne Coughlin, American lawyer
- Anne Cecilie de la Cour (born 1993), Danish handball player
- Anne de Courcy (born 1927), English biographer and journalist
- Anne Ross Cousin (1824–1906), British poet, musician and songwriter
- Anne Covell (1950–2020), Canadian sprinter
- Anne Cowdrey, 14th Lady Herries of Terregles (1938–2014), British racehorse trainer and peeress
- Anne Cowley, American astronomer
- Anne Craine (born 1954), Manx politician
- Anne Moncure Crane (1838–1872), American novelist
- Anne Crawford Flexner (1874–1955), American playwright
- Anne-Armande de Crequy (1637–1709), French court official
- Anne-Blandine Crochet (born 1978), French canoeist
- Anne B. Crockett-Stark (born 1942), American politician
- Anne Crone (1915–1972), Irish novelist and teacher
- Anne Cross (born 1964), Australian long-distance runner
- Anne Haney Cross (born 1956), American neurologist and neuroimmunologist
- Anne Croy, professor at Queen's University and reproductive immunologist
- Anne Virginia Culbertson (1857–1918), American writer
- Anne Cumming (1917–1993), British writer and sexual adventurer
- Anne Currier, American ceramicist
- Anne Curry, British medieval and military historian
- Anne Curtis (born 1985), Filipino-Australian actress and television host
- Anne Curwen (1889–1973), British charity executive
- Anne Curzan, American linguist
- Anne Cushman, American yoga teacher
- Anne Cutler (1945–2022), American psycholinguist and educator
- Anne Dacier (1654–1720), French scholar and translator of the classics
- Anne Innis Dagg (1933–2024), Canadian zoologist, feminist and author
- Anne-Laure Dalibard (born 1982), French mathematician
- Anne Dalton (born 1988), Irish camogie player
- Anne Daly (1860–1924), Australian Sister of Charity and founder of hospitals
- Anne van Dam (born 1995), Dutch golfer
- Anne Dambricourt-Malassé (born 1959), French paleo anthropologist
- Anne Seymour Damer (1749–1828), English sculptor
- Anne Dandurand (born 1953), French-Canadian actor, producer, activist and author
- Anne Dangar (1885–1951), Australian artist
- Anne Daniel (1858–1944), American physician and public health reformer
- Anne Darwin (1841–1851), daughter of Charles Darwin
- Anne Daubenspeck-Focke (1922–2021), German sculptor and painter
- Anne Dauphinais (born 1960), American politician
- Anne-France Dautheville (born 1944), French journalist, writer, traveler and motorcyclist
- Anne Davaille, French geophysicist
- Anne Davidson (1937–2008), Scottish artist and sculptor
- Anne Daw, Australian environmental activist
- Anne Teresa De Keersmaeker (born 1960), Belgian choreographer
- Anne De Salvo (born 1949), American actress
- Anne Deane (c. 1834–1905), Irish businesswoman
- Anne E. DeChant, American singer-songwriter
- Anne DeGrace, Canadian fiction writer and illustrator
- Anne Karin Dehle (born 1942), Norwegian figure skater
- Anne Deighton, British historian
- Anne Dejean-Assémat (born 1957), French biologist
- Anne Delamere (1921–2006), New Zealand public servant
- Anne Dell (born 1950), Australian biochemist
- Anne Delvaux (born 1970), Belgian politician
- Anne DeMarinis, American musical artist
- Anne Démians (born 1963), French architect
- Anne Dempster Kyle (1896–1966), American children's author
- Anne Denholm (born 1991), Welsh harpist
- Anne E. Derse (born 1954), American diplomat
- Anne Victoire Dervieux (1752–1826), French singer
- Anne Desclos (1907–1998), French journalist and novelist
- Anne Desjardins, Canadian chef
- Anne Deslions (c. 1829–1873), French courtesan during the Second French Empire
- Anne Desmet (born 1964), British artist
- Anne Devereux, English noblewoman
- Anne Devereux-Mills (born 1962), American businesswoman, author, public speaker and entrepreneur
- Anne Deveson (1930–2016), Australian novelist, broadcaster and filmmaker
- Anne Devlin (writer), British writer
- Anne Devlin (1780–1851), Irish republican
- Anne de Deyster (died 1747), Belgian artist
- Anne Diamond (born 1954), British journalist and broadcaster
- Anne Dias-Griffin (born 1970), French-American investor
- Anne Dick (died 1741), Scottish poet and eccentric
- Anne Dickins (born 1967), British paracanoeist
- Anne Dickmann (born 1958), German rower
- Anne Dickson (born 1928), Northern Irish politician
- Anne Dickson-Waiko, Papua New Guinean academic
- Anne-Sophie Dielen, science communicator
- Anne Dieu-le-Veut (1661–1710), French pirate
- Anne Digby (born 1943), British children's writer
- Anne Diggory, American painter
- Anne-Mette van Dijk (born 1968), Danish badminton player
- Anne Disbrowe (1795–1855), British socialite
- Anne Distel (born 1947), French curator and art critic
- Anne Ditchburn (born 1949), Canadian ballet dancer, choreographer and film actress
- Anne Doddington (died 1690), English heiress
- Anne Dodge (born 1958), Canadian sprint kayaker
- Anne van Doeveryn (1549–1625), Dutch poet
- Anne Donahue (born 1956), American politician
- Anne Donnelly, Irish painter
- Anne Donovan (born 1961), American basketball player and coach
- Anne Donovan (author), Scottish author
- Anne Dorval (born 1960), Franco-Canadian actress
- Anne Downie (born 1939), Scottish actress and writer
- Anne Dowriche, English poet and historian
- Anne Doyle (born 1952), Irish journalist, presenter and former newsreader
- Anne Doyle (sports broadcaster) (born 1948), American woman leader
- Anne Draper (1917–1973), American trade unionist and activist
- Anne Drungis (1930–2005), American fencer
- Anne Drysdale (1792–1853), Scottish squatter in colonial Australia
- Anne Ducros (born 1959), French jazz singer
- Anne Dudek (born 1975), American actress
- Anne Duden, German writer
- Anne Duguël (1945–2015), Belgian writer
- Anne Duncan, British businesswoman
- Anne Dunham (born 1948), British para-equestrian
- Anne Dunlop, Canadian art historian
- Anne Dunn (born 1929), English artist
- Anne Dunwoodie, Scottish lawn bowler and journalist
- Anne Dupire (1910–1993), French swimmer
- Anne Dutton (1692–1765), English poet and religious writer
- Anne Dybka (1921–2007), Australian artist
- Anne Dyer (born 1957), British Anglican bishop and academic administrator
- Anne Thaxter Eaton (1881–1971), American author, book reviewer and children's librarian
- Anne Ebbs (1940–2024), Irish Paralympic in table tennis
- Anne Eckner (born 1979), German speed skater
- Anne Eckstein (born 1955), Australian politician
- Anne Ector Pleasant (1878–1934), American school teacher
- Anne Edmonds (born 1979), Australian comedian and actor
- Anne Eggebroten, American author and feminist scholar
- Anne Eggleston (1934–1994), Canadian composer and educator
- Anne H. Ehrlich (born 1933), American conversation biologist and writer
- Anne Ehscheidt (1919–1947), German diver
- Anne Gerd Eieland (born 1982), Norwegian high jumper
- Anne Eisenhower (1949–2022), American interior designer
- Anne Eisner Putnam (1911–1967), American painter
- Anne Elder (1918–1976), Australian poet and dancer
- Anne Elizabeth, American romance novel writer
- Anne Elliot (1856–1941), English novelist
- Anne Ellis (1875–1938), American author
- Anne Else, New Zealand writer and editor
- Anne Karin Elstad (1938–2012), Norwegian author
- Anne Elstner (1899–1981), American actress
- Anne Elvebakk (born 1966), Norwegian biathlete
- Anne Elvey, Australian academic and poet
- Anne Elwood (c. 1796–1873), British traveler, writer and biographer
- Anne Emerman (1937–2021), American disability rights activist
- Anne Emery, Canadian author of mystery novels
- Anne Emery (young adult writer) (1907–1987), American author of popular teen romance novels (1946–1980)
- Anne Emery-Dumas (born 1959), French politician
- Anne Emlen Mifflin, Quaker minister and activist in early America
- Anne Emmanuel, 8th Duke of Croÿ, French soldier
- Anne Émond (born 1982), Canadian film director and screenwriter
- Anne Catherine Emmerich (1774–1824), German nun, mystic and stigmatic
- Anne-Sophie Endeler (born 1984), French gymnast
- Anne Enger (born 1949), Norwegian politician
- Anne Enright (born 1962), Irish writer
- Anne Ephrussi (born 1955), French biologist
- Anne-Sofie Ernstrøm (born 1992), Danish handball player
- Anne Erroll (1656–c. 1719), Scottish Jacobite and naturalist
- Anne Esdall (1717/1718–c. 1795), Irish printer, publisher and bookseller
- Anne Essam (born 1992), Cameroonian handball player
- Anne d'Essling (1802–1887), French courtier
- Anne Etchegoyen, French singer
- Anne Everett (1943–2013), American painter
- Anne Faber, Luxembourg cookbook writer and television presenter
- Anne Fadiman (born 1953), American essayist, journalist and magazine editor
- Anne Fairbairn (1928–2018), Australian post and journalist
- Anne Fairfax (1617/1618–1665), English noblewoman
- Anne Fakhouri (1974–2022), French author
- Anne Fanning, Canadian physician and researcher
- Anne Farmer, psychiatrist
- Anne Farquhar (born 1948), English javelin thrower
- Anne Fausto-Sterling, American sociologist
- Anne Walter Fearn (1867–1939), American physician
- Anne Feeney (1951–2021), American singer-songwriter and musician
- Anne Feldhaus, American historian of religion
- Anne Ferm (born 1969), Swedish ice hockey player
- Anne Fernald, American psychologist
- Anne-Mette Fernandes, Danish cricketer
- Anne Fernández de Corres (born 1998), Spanish rugby union player
- Anne Ferran, Australian photographer
- Anne Ferrand (c. 1657–1740), French writer
- Anne Ferreira (born 1961), French politician
- Anne Ferrell Tata, American politician from Virginia
- Anne Ferris (born 1954), Irish Labour Party politician
- Anne Field (1926–2011), British Army officer
- Anne Sofie Filtenborg (born 1998), Danish handball player
- Anne Fine (born 1947), British children's and adult writer
- Anne Finlay (1898–1963), Scottish painter
- Anne Finucane (born 1952), American banker
- Anne Firth Murray (born 1935), New Zealand activist and writer
- Anne Firth (1918–1961), British actress
- Anne Harriet Fish (1890–1964), British cartoonist and illustrator
- Anne Fishbein (born 1958), American photographer
- Anne B. Fisher, American novelist
- Anne Fleming (born 1964), Canadian fiction writer
- Anne Fletcher (born 1966), American choreographer and film director
- Anne Flett-Giordano, American television producer and screenwriter
- Anne Fleur Dekker (born 1994), Dutch journalist
- Anne-Laure Florentin (born 1991), French karateka
- Anne Floriet (born 1963), French Paralympic athlete
- Anne Flournoy (born 1952), American film director
- Anne Fogarty (1919–1980), American fashion designer
- Anne-Laure Folly (born 1954), Togolese documentary filmmaker
- Anne Stella Fomumbod, Cameroonian women's rights activist
- Anne Fontaine (designer) (born 1971), Paris-based fashion designer
- Anne Fontaine (born 1959), French film director, screenwriter, and actress
- Anne Forbes (1745–1834), Scottish artist
- Anne Pappenheimer Forbes (1911–1992), American endocrinologist
- Anne Ford (1737–1824), English musician and singer
- Anne N. Foreman (born 1947), American politician
- Anne Forrester Holloway (1941–2006), American diplomat
- Anne Fortier (born 1971), Danish-Canadian writer
- Anne Fougeron (born 1955), French-American architect, lecturer and author
- Anne Francine (1917–1999), American actress and cabaret singer
- Anne Francis (1930–2011), American actress
- Anne Francis (author) (1738–1800), English classical scholar and poet
- Anne Frank (1929–1945), German-Dutch diarist and Holocaust victim
- Anne Fraser (born 1951), New Zealand politician
- Anne Fraser Bon (1838–1936), Scottish-born Australian pastoralist, philanthropist and advocate
- Anne Frasier, American novelist
- Anne Frater, Scottish poet
- Anne Freitas (born 1975), Brazilian professional bodybuilder
- Anne Fremantle (1909–2002), English-American journalist, translator, poet, novelist and biographer
- Anne French, New Zealand politician
- Anne-Sophie Frigout (born 1991), French educator and politician
- Anne Froelick (1913–2010), American screenwriter
- Anne Cathrine Frøstrup (born 1954), Norwegian civil servant
- Anne Fulda (born 1963), French journalist
- Anne Fulenwider (born 1972), American journalist
- Anne Fuller, Irish novelist
- Anne Fulwood (born 1959), Australian former reporter, journalist and writer
- Anne Gabriel, Belgian tennis player
- Anne Gadegaard (born 1991), Danish singer
- Anne Gallagher, Australian lawyer and activist
- Anne Gamble Kennedy (1920–2001), American pianist
- Anne Gambrill, New Zealand lawyer and judge
- Anne Gannon (born 1947), American politician from Florida
- Anne García-Romero, American dramatist
- Anne Garefino (born 1959), American film and television producer
- Anne Garrels (1951–2022), American journalist
- Anne F. Garréta, French novelist
- Anne Gastinel (born 1971), French cellist and professor
- Anne de Gaulle (1928–1948), daughter of Charles de Gaulle
- Anne Nicol Gaylor (1926–2015), American atheist and campaigner for abortion rights
- Anne Geddes (born 1956), Australian photographer and businesswoman
- Anne Gelb, mathematician
- Anne Gell (born 1963), British Church of England priest
- Anne Gellinek, German journalist and TV host
- Anne Genetet (born 1963), French politician
- Anne Ruggles Gere, American academic
- Anne Gerety (1926–2003), American actress
- Anne Germond, South African-born Anglican bishop
- Anne Gerritsen, academic at Leiden University and Warwick University
- Anne A. Gershon, American Pediatric Infectious Disease Researcher
- Anne Giardini, Canadian business executive, journalist, lawyer and writer
- Anne E. Giblin, marine biologist and researcher
- Anne-Catherine Gillet, Belgian opera singer
- Anne Lorne Gillies (born 1944), Scottish singer, writer and activist
- Anne J. Gilliland, archivist and academic
- Anne Gilman, American artist
- Anne-Aymone Giscard d'Estaing (born 1933), spouse of the President of France (1974–1981)
- Anne Gittinger, American billionaire heiress
- Anne Helene Gjelstad (born 1956), Norwegian photographer and fashion designer
- Anne Line Gjersem (born 1994), Norwegian figure skater
- Anne Lise Gjøstøl (born 1952), Norwegian singer, actress and visual artist
- Anne-Karin Glase (born 1954), German politician
- Anne Gliddon (1807–1878), English artist and illustrator
- Anne Gnahouret Tatret, Ivorian politician
- Anne Gobi (born 1962), American politician
- Anne Marit Godal (born 1973), Norwegian encyclopedist
- Anne Godard (born 1971), French writer
- Anne Godfrey-Smith, Australian poet, theatre director and women's activist
- Anne Godlid, Norwegian storyteller
- Anne Godwin (1897–1992), British trade unionist
- Anne Goffin (born 1957), Belgian sport shooter
- Anne Goldberg, Belgian physicist
- Anne Golden (born 1941), Canadian administrator
- Anne Goldgar, American historian, author and academic
- Anne Goldthwaite (1869–1944), American artist and advocate of women's rights
- Anne-France Goldwater (born 1960), Canadian lawyer and academic
- Anne Golon (1921–2017), French author
- Anne Gonzales (born 1963), American politician
- Anne Goodenough, British ecologist and Professor of Applied Ecology
- Anne Goodwin Winslow (1875–1959), American writer
- Anne Goriely, British geneticist and academic
- Anne Gorsuch Burford (1942–2004), American politician and attorney
- Anne Gould Hauberg (1917–2016), American philanthropist
- Anne Goulding, New Zealand library academic
- Anne Goursaud (born 1943), American film editor and director
- Anne Gøye (1609–1681), Danish noblewoman and book collector
- Anne de Graaf (born 1959), Dutch children's writer
- Anne Gracie, Australian novelist
- Anne-Caroline Graffe (born 1986), French taekwondo practitioner
- Anne Grant (1755–1838), Scottish poet, author
- Anne de Graville, French Renaissance poet
- Anne Gravoin (born 1965), French violinist
- Anne Greaves (1889–1971), first woman to become a member of the Institute of Quarrying
- Anne Greenbaum, American applied mathematician and academic
- Anne Greenough, British pediatrician
- Anne Gregg (1940–2006), British travel writer and TV presenter
- Anna-Geneviève Greuze (1762–1842), French artist
- Anne Grey, Baroness Hussey (c.1490–1545), English noblewoman
- Anne Griffin (fl 2013 –), Irish short story writer and novelist
- Anne Griffith (1734–1821), Welsh practitioner of folk medicine
- Anne Griffiths (1932–2017), British librarian and archivist
- Anne Grimdalen (1899–1961), Norwegian sculptor
- Anne Grimes (1912–2004), American journalist, musician and historian of American folklore
- Anne-Lise Grobéty (1949–2010), Swiss journalist and writer
- Anne Grommerch (1970–2016), French politician
- Anne Grosvold (born 1950), Norwegian journalist
- Anne Grousbeck (born 1966), American tennis player
- Anne Hull Grundy (1926–1984), German-born British art collector and philanthropist
- Anne Hege Grung (born 1965), Norwegian priest
- Anne Grunow, American geologist
- Anne Guéret (1760–1805), French painter
- Anne Guerrant (born 1948), American tennis player
- Anne de Guigné (1911–1922), French girl for Roman Catholic Sainthood
- Anne Lee Guinness (1839–1889), Irish philanthropist
- Anne Gulbrandsen (born 1994), Norwegian speed skater
- Anne Gullestad (1925–1998), Norwegian actress and theatre director
- Anne Gunn, Scottish musician and inventor
- Anne Gunning (1929–1990), British fashion model
- Anne Gwynne (1918–2003), American actress
- Anne Haanpää (born 1959), Finnish ice hockey official and player
- Anne Haast (born 1993), Dutch chess player
- Anne Hadden, American librarian
- Anne Haddy (1930–1999), Australian actress, television presenter and voice artist
- Anne-Julia Hagen (born 1990), German model and beauty pageant winner
- Anne Hagopian (1927–2008), American art historian
- Anne Lyon Haight (1891–1977), American author, essayist and rare book collector
- Anne Haigis (born 1955), German musician, singer and songwriter
- Anne Hajek (born 1951), American politician
- Anne Halkett, English religious writer and autobiographer
- Anne Halkivaha (born 1986), Finnish race walker
- Anne Hall, American diplomat
- Anne Hall Levine (born 1960), American radio broadcaster
- Anne Halley (1928–2004), German-born American writer
- Anne Hallward, American psychiatrist and public radio show host
- Anne Hamblett (1915–1993), New Zealand artist
- Anne Hamburger, American theatre manager
- Anne Hampson (1928–2014), British writer
- Anne Hampton Brewster (1818–1892), American journalist
- Anne Karin Hamre, Norwegian politician and civil servant
- Anne Haney (1934–2001), American actress
- Anne Hankford (c. 1431–1485), English noble
- Anne Hänninen (born 1958), Finnish poet, essayist and writer
- Anne Haour, anthropologically trained archaeologist
- Anne Raikes Harding (1779–1858), English writer
- Anne Hardy, British photographer
- Anne Hare (born 1964), New Zealand distance runner
- Anne Hargreaves, British missionary educator
- Anne d'Harnoncourt (1943–2008), American art historian
- Anne Harper (1941–2025), British political activist
- Anne Harriman Vanderbilt (1861–1940), American heiress
- Anne Harrington, American historian of science
- Anne-Sophie Harsch (born 1999), Luxembourgish cyclist
- Anne Le Marquand Hartigan (1931–2022), Irish poet, painter and playwright
- Anne Harwick, American athlete
- Anne Valérie Hash (born 1971), French fashion designer
- Anne Haskell (born 1943), American politician
- Anne Louise Hassing (born 1967), Danish actress
- Anne Hatchard (born 1998), Australian rules footballer
- Anne Hathaway (born 1982), American actress
- Anne Hathaway (wife of Shakespeare) (1556–1623)
- Anne-Solenne Hatte, French journalist
- Anne Haug (born 1983), German triathlete
- Anne Haug (politician) (1921–2023), Norwegian politician
- Anne Margrethe Hausken (born 1976), Norwegian orienteer
- Anne Haverty (born 1959), Irish novelist and poet
- Anne Hawley (born 1943), American museum director
- Anne Healey (born 1951), American politician
- Anne Healy (born 1939), American artist
- Anne Hearst (born 1955), American socialite and philanthropist
- Anne-Louise Heath, New Zealand nutritionist
- Anne Hébert (1916–2000), Canadian author and poet
- Anne Heche (1969–2022), American actress
- Anne Hegerty (born 1958), English quizzer and television personality
- Anne Heggtveit (born 1939), Canadian alpine skier
- Anne Heinis (born 1987), Dutch water polo player
- Anne Heitmann, German poet
- Anne-Laure Heitz (born 1982), French tennis player
- Anne Helin (born 1987), Finnish ice hockey player
- Anne Helioff (1910–2001), American painter
- Anne le Helley (born 1971), French sailor
- Anne Helm (born 1938), American actress and author
- Anne Helm (politician) (born 1986), German politician and voice actress
- Anne Hendershott (born 1949), American author and professor
- Anne Hendricks Bass (1941–2020), American investor
- Anne Henning (born 1955), American speed skater
- Anne Hepple (1877–1959), British writer and editor
- Anne Heraty (born 1961), Irish businesswoman
- Anne-Cathrine Herdorf (born 1967), Danish singer and actress
- Anne Valen Hestetun (1920–2009), Norwegian politician
- Anne Heung (born 1974), Hong Kong-born Canadian actress and model
- Anne Heywood (1931–2023), British actress
- Anne Hidalgo (born 1959), French politician, Mayor of Paris
- Anne Higonnet, American art historian
- Anne Hillerman (born 1949), American journalist and novelist
- Anne Hills (born 1953), American folk singer songwriter
- Anne Hird, American middle and long-distance runner
- Anne Hirondelle (born 1944), American ceramicist
- Anne Sofie Hjort (born 1992), Danish handball player
- Anne Mette Hjortshøj, Danish studio potter
- Anne-Christine Hladky, French meta materials scientist
- Anne Hobbs (born 1959), British tennis player
- Anne Hocking (c. 1889–1966), English crime writer
- Anne-Lot Hoek, Dutch historian, researcher and author
- Anne Catherine Hof Blinks (1903–1995), American botanist, weaver and textile scholar
- Anne Line Hogstad, Norwegian kickboxer
- Anne Hollander (1930–2014), American historian
- Anne Holm (1922–1998), Danish writer
- Anne Holmberg, American writer
- Anne Holmlund (born 1964), Finnish politician
- Anne Grete Holmsgaard (born 1948), Danish energy expert and politician
- Anne Bolette Holsen (1856–1913), Norwegian proponent for women's rights
- Anne Holt (born 1958), Norwegian author, lawyer and former Minister of Justice
- Anne Holten (born 1972), Norwegian sport wrestler
- Anne Holton (born 1958), American lawyer, judge and politician
- Anne Holtsmark (1896–1974), Norwegian professor of Old Norse studies
- Anne Homer (1907–1995), American writer
- Anne Catherine Hoof Green (c. 1720–1775), American journalist
- Anne Hooper (born 1941), British sex therapist
- Anne Hope (activist), South African anti-apartheid activist
- Anne Hope (1809–1887), English historian
- Anne Hopkins Aitken (1911–1994), American Zen Buddhist
- Anne H. Hopkins, American academic administrator
- Anne Horak Gallagher (born 1984), American actress
- Anne M. Houtman, American academic administrator
- Anne-Birthe Hove (1951–2012), Greenlandic graphic artist
- Anne Howells (1941–2022), British operatic mezzo-soprano
- Anne Hubinger (born 1993), German handball player
- Anne Huff, German academic
- Anne Hugon (born 1965), French historian and Africanist
- Anne Hull (born 1961), American journalist and writer
- Anne Hultgren, American chemist
- Anne Humby, English actress
- Anne Hummert (1905–1996), American radio soap opera writer
- Anne Hung, Taiwanese diplomat
- Anne Hunter (1742–1821), English salonnière and poet
- Anne Huotari (born 1959), Finnish politician
- Anne Huré (1918–?), French writer
- Anne Hutchinson (1591–1643), American religious dissenter
- Anne F. Hyde, American historian and academic
- Anne Hyde (1637–1671), Duchess of York
- Anne Marguerite Hyde de Neuville (1771–1849), French painter
- Anne Hykkelbjerg (born 2000), Danish handball player
- Anne Hytta (born 1974), Norwegian musician
- Anne Igartiburu (born 1969), Spanish Basque television presenter and actress
- Anne-Olaug Ingeborgrud (1925–2003), Norwegian politician
- Anne Ingram, New Zealand writer, journalist and festival organizer
- Anne Stine Ingstad (1918–1997), Norwegian archaeologist
- Anne Isaacs (born 1949), American children's book writer
- Anne Ishii (born 1979), American writer and translator
- Anne Mette Iversen (born 1972), Danish jazz bassist and composer
- Anne Jackson (1925–2016), American actress
- Anne Jaclard (1843–1887), Russian socialist
- Anne Marit Jacobsen (born 1946), Norwegian actress
- Anne Jahren (born 1963), Norwegian cross-country skier
- Anne Janelle, Canadian musician
- Anne Janssen, German politician
- Anne Jardin (born 1959), Canadian swimmer
- Anne Burton Jeffers (1851–1946), American librarian and first female State Librarian of Maryland
- Anne Jefferson (born 1979), American hydrologist
- Anne Jeffreys (1923–2017), American actress and singer
- Anne Jenkin, Baroness Jenkin of Kennington (born 1955), British life peer
- Anne Elisabet Jensen (born 1951), Danish politician
- Anne Grethe Jensen (born 1951), Danish equestrian
- Anne Hald Jensen (born 1990), Danish badminton player
- Anne Grethe Jeppesen (born 1957), Norwegian sport shooter
- Anne Johns, Scottish-born Australian lawn bowler
- Anne Johnsen (born 1967), Norwegian sport wrestler
- Anne Jolliffe (1933–2021), Australian artist
- Anne B. Jolly (born 1954), American prelate of the Episcopal Church
- Anne Duk Hee Jordan (born 1978), Korean-German artist
- Anne Jøtun (born 1955), Norwegian curler and world champion
- Anne Joutel, French neurologist and medical geneticist
- Anne Judell (born 1942), Australian artist
- Anne Judkins (born 1964), New Zealand race walker
- Anne Juel, fluid dynamics researcher
- Anne-Dauphine Julliand (born 1973), French woman writer
- Anne Jung, German rhythmic gymnast
- Anne Juuko, Ugandan investment banker and corporate executive
- Anne Kabagambe, Ugandan businesswoman
- Anne Kahane (1924–2023), Canadian artist
- Anne-Marcelle Kahn (1896–1965), first French female engineer
- Anne Kaiser (born 1968), American politician
- Anne Kajir, Papua New Guinean attorney and environmentalist
- Anne Kakela (born 1970), American rower
- Anne Kalmari (born 1968), Finnish politician
- Anne Kalmering (born 1962), Swedish singer of Russian-Jewish descent
- Anne-Sophie Kaloghiros, mathematics researcher
- Anne Kjersti Kalvå (born 1992), Norwegian cross-country skier
- Anne Kananu, Kenyan politician
- Anne Kang, Canadian politician
- Anne Kansiime (born 1986), Ugandan entertainer, comedian and actress
- Anne Karanja, Kenyan banker
- Anne Kauffman, American director
- Anne Kavanagh, Australian epidemiologist and researcher
- Anne E. Kazak (born 1955), American clinical psychologist, educator and writer
- Anne Kearney (born 1967), American chef
- Anne Keast-Butler, director of GCHQ
- Anne Keenan-Buckley (born 1962), Irish middle-distance runner
- Anne Keilway, English aristocrat
- Anne Kellas, Australian poet, reviewer and editor
- Anne Kelso (born 1954), Australian biomedical researcher
- Anne Kemp, Australian ichthyologist and paleoichthyologist
- Anne Kendrick Benedict, American author
- Anne R. Kenney (1950–2022), American librarian and archivist
- Anne Kenney, television writer and producer
- Anne Keothavong (born 1983), British tennis player
- Anne Ker (1766–1821), English novelist
- Anne-Mie van Kerckhoven (born 1951), Belgian artist
- Anne Kernan (1933–2020), Irish particle physicist
- Anne Kerry Ford (born 1958), American cabaret singer and actress
- Anne Kerylen (1943–2021), French actress
- Anne Khayumbi (born 1961), Kenyan volleyball player
- Anne-Lise Kielland (1919–2005), Norwegian equestrian
- Anne Kiguta (born 1984), Kenyan journalist, talk show host and news anchor
- Anne-Beatrice Kihara, Kenyan physician and professor
- Anne Killigrew (1660–1685), British poet and artist
- Anne Kimbell (1932–2017), American actress
- Anne Kingsbury Wollstonecraft (1791–1828), American botanist, scientific illustrator, writer and advocate for women's rights
- Anne L. Kinney, American scientist
- Anne Kiremidjian (born 1949), American academic
- Anne Kirk (born 1951), Scottish darts player
- Anne Kirkbride (1954–2015), English soap actress
- Anne Kirkpatrick (police officer), American law enforcement officer
- Anne Kirkpatrick (born 1952), Australian country music singer
- Anne Rose Kitagawa (born 1965), American curator
- Anne Kiunuhe, Kenyan lawyer and accountant
- Anne-Laure Klein, French rhythmic gymnast
- Anne Klinck (1943–2023), Canadian academic
- Anne Knudsen (1948–2022), Danish anthropologist, editor, journalist and researcher
- Anne Knüpp (born 1954), German footballer
- Anne Koedt (born 1941), American feminist activist and author
- Anne-Brit Kolstø (born 1945), Norwegian microbiologist
- Anne Kornblut (born 1973), American journalist
- Anne Marit Korsvold (born 1966), Norwegian orienteer
- Anne Kosgei, Kenyan long-distance runner
- Anne Krabbe (1552–1618), Danish writer
- Anne Kreamer (born 1955), American journalist and author
- Anne Kremer (born 1975), Luxembourgish tennis player
- Anne Kreuzberg (born 1963), German footballer
- Anne Krigsvoll (born 1957), Norwegian actress
- Anne Kristen (1937–1996), Scottish actress
- Anne-Sophie de Kristoffy (born 1961), French figure skater
- Anne Kronenberg, American politician and LGBT rights activist
- Anne Kuhm (born 1996), French artistic gymnast
- Anne Kuik (born 1987), Dutch politician
- Anne Kukkohovi (born 1970), Finnish model and television presenter
- Anne Kuljian (born 1949), set decorator
- Anne Kulle (1944–2020), Swedish actress
- Anne Kura (born 1984), German politician
- Anne Kursinski (born 1959), American equestrian
- Anne Kyllönen (born 1987), Finnish cross-country skier
- Anne La Flamme, New Zealand immunologist
- Anne-César de La Luzerne (1741–1791), French soldier and diplomat
- Anne de La Roche-Guilhem (1644–1707/1710), French writer and translator
- Anne de La Vigne (1634–1684), French poet
- Anne LaBastille (1933–2011), American author and ecologist
- Anne Lacaton (born 1955), French architect
- Anne Lacey, Scottish actress
- Anne Lackman (born 1969), Finnish swimmer
- Anne-Catherine Lacroix (born 1978), Belgian fashion model
- Anne Lafortune, Seychellois teacher and diplomat
- Anne-Chatrine Lafrenz (1936–2023), German athlete
- Anne Lagacé Dowson, Canadian radio journalist
- Anne Laird (born 1970), Scottish curler
- Anne-Louise Lambert (born 1955), Australian actress
- Anne Lammila (born 1957), Finnish diplomat
- Anne Lamott (born 1954), American novelist and nonfiction writer
- Anne Kari Lande Hasle (born 1946), Norwegian civil servant
- Anne Lande Peters (born 1967), Norwegian translator
- Anne Landsman (born 1959), South African-born novelist based in New York
- Anne-Christine Lang (born 1961), French politician
- Anne Françoise Elisabeth Lange (1772–1816), French actress
- Anne Langton (1804–1893), Canadian artist
- Anne Laperrouze (born 1956), French politician
- Anne-Sophie Lapix (born 1972), French journalist and television presenter
- Anne Laplantine (born 1972), French musician
- Anne Larigauderie, French ecologist
- Anne Margrethe Larsen (born 1950), Norwegian politician
- Anne Lascaris (1487–1554), French noblewoman
- Anne Lauber (born 1943), Canadian composer, conductor and music educator
- Anne Laubies (born 1953), French civil servant
- Anne Laughlin (born 1955), American novelist
- Anne-Maria Laukkanen, Finnish researcher and professor
- Anne Lauvergeon (born 1959), French businesswoman
- Anne-Sophie Lavoine, French rhythmic gymnast
- Anne Mary Lawler (1908–1980), American writer
- Anne Lawrence (born 1950), American psychologist
- Anne E. Lazarus (born 1952), American judge
- Anne-Yvonne Le Dain (born 1955), French politician
- Anne Le Hénanff (born 1969), French politician
- Anne-Louise Le Jeuneux (died 1794), French artist
- Anne Le Ny (born 1962), French actress, screenwriter and film director
- Anne-Sophie Le Paranthoën (born 1977), French swimmer
- Anne Winship Bates Leach (1896–1977), American heiress and philanthropist
- Anne Leadbeater, Australian bushfire disaster recovery specialist
- Anne Leahy (1925–2023), New Zealand archaeologist
- Anne Leaton (1932–2016), American novelist
- Anne LeBaron (born 1953), American post-modern composer, writer and academic
- Anne-Claude Leflaive (1956–2015), French winemaker
- Anne Legault (born 1958), Canadian actress, writer and educator
- Anne M. Leggett (born 1947), American mathematician logician
- Anne Leinonen, Finnish writer
- Anne Lemaître, Belgian applied mathematician
- Anne Lenner (1912–1997), English vocalist
- Anne Lesage (born 1969), French engineer
- Anne de Leseleuc (1927–2022), French actress, writer and historian
- Anne Létourneau (born 1958), Canadian actress
- Anne Leuchars, broadcaster and journalist
- Anne L'Huillier (born 1958), French-Swedish physicist
- Anne Liardet (born 1961), French sailor
- Anne Liburd (1920–2007), Kittitian women's rights activist
- Anne-Catherine de Ligniville, Madame Helvétius (1722–1800), French salon hostess and feline lover
- Anne Lill (born 1946), Estonian classical philologist
- Anne Lindbergh (1940–1993), American writer
- Anne Lindboe (born 1971), Norwegian civil servant
- Anne Lindeman, American politician
- Anne Lindmo (born 1970), Norwegian TV host
- Anne Line, English catholic martyr
- Anne Linehan (born 1973), Irish cricketer
- Anne Lingford-Hughes, British psychiatrist
- Anne Kristine Linnestad (born 1961), Norwegian politician
- Anne Linnet (born 1953), Danish singer, composer and writer
- Anne Grodzins Lipow (1935–2004), American librarian
- Anne Lister (1791–1840), English landowner and lesbian artist
- Anne Lobeck, American linguist
- Anne Locke, English poet, translator and Calvinist religious figure
- Anne M. Lofaso (born 1965), American lawyer
- Anne Logston (born 1962), American writer
- Anne Lonnberg (born 1948), American actress
- Anne Lonsdale (born 1941), British sinologist
- Anne E. Lopez, attorney general of Hawaii (2022–present)
- Anne Loree, Canadian singer-songwriter
- Anne Lorentzen (1963–2013), Norwegian singer and media
- Anne Løset (died 1679), Norwegian woman tried for alleged sorcery
- Anne Loughlin (1894–1979), British activist
- Anne Louhelainen (born 1965), Finnish politician
- Anne Lovett, French musical artist
- Anne Lucas (born 1946), Australian actress
- Anne Ludvigsson (born 1950), Swedish politician
- Anne Lumsden, Indian hockey player
- Anne Lundberg (born 1966), Swedish television presenter and journalist
- Anne Birgitte Lundholt (born 1952), Danish politician and businessperson
- Anne Lundmark (born 1949), Swedish orienteering competitor
- Anne Lundy (born 1954), American conductor and music educator
- Anne Lünenbürger (born 1964), German operatic soprano
- Anne Lush (1857–1937), New Zealand painter and missionary
- Anne Lykke (1595–1641), Danish noblewoman and royal mistress
- Anne Bozeman Lyon (1860–1936), American author
- Anne Maar (born 1965), German author
- Anne Macaulay (1924–1998), Scottish musicologist
- Anne MacGregor (born 1960), British doctor
- Anne Mackintosh (1723–1784), Scottish Jacobite
- Anne MacLeod (born 1951), Scottish writer
- Anne Macnaghten (1908–2000), British violist
- Anne MacNaughton, American poet
- Anne Mactavish, Canadian judge
- Anne Maddern (born 1955), Australian politician
- Anne Sofie Madsen (born 1979), Danish fashion designer
- Anne Magill, British artist
- Anne Mahlum (born 1980), founder and CEO of Solidcare
- Anne Main (born 1957), British politician
- Anne Makinda (born 1949), Tanzanian politician
- Anne Mäkinen (born 1976), Finnish footballer
- Anne Malecela (born 1948), Tanzanian politician
- Anne Mall (born 1974), American tennis player
- Anne Mallory, American novelist
- Anne Malmi (born 1965), Finnish curler and coach
- Anne Manne (born 1955), Australian journalist and social philosopher
- Anne Marden (activist) (1926–2022), Hong Kong children's rights activist
- Anne Marden (rower) (born 1958), American rower
- Anne Marev (1932–2019), Belgian actress and writer
- Anne Margiste (born 1942), Estonian actress
- Anne Windfohr Marion (1938–2020), American philanthropist
- Anne Kristi Marken (born 1975), Norwegian cross-country skier
- Anne Marriott (1913–1997), Canadian writer
- Anne Marsden Thomas (born 1948), English organist and pedagogue
- Anne Marshall (fl. 1661–1682), English actress
- Anne Marshall (swimmer) (born 1941), English swimmer
- Anne-Flore Marxer (born 1984), Franco-Swiss snowboarder
- Anne Mather (born 1936), British novelist
- Anne Sophie Mathis (born 1977), French boxer
- Anne Matindi (born 1942), Kenyan nurse and children's writer
- Anne Matthes (born 1985), German volleyball player
- Anne Matthews, college lecturer and environmental author
- Anne L. Matthews, woman vice president international voluntary organization
- Anne Mattila (born 1984), Finnish singer and painter
- Anne Mawathe, Kenyan journalist
- Anne M. Mayes (1964–2011), material science and engineer
- Anne Mazer (born 1953), American novelist
- Anne Fatoumata M'Bairo (born 1993), French judoka
- Anne McAllister (speech therapist) (1892–1983), Scottish speech therapist and teacher
- Anne McAllister, American novelist
- Anne McAlpine (born 1986), Scottish broadcaster
- Anne McCaffrey (1926–2011), American-born Irish science fiction and fantasy writer
- Anne E. McCall, academic administrator and literary scholar
- Anne McClain (born 1979), United States Army officer and astronaut
- Anne O'Hare McCormick (1880–1954), American journalist
- Anne McCoy, theoretical chemist
- Anne McCue, Australian singer songwriter
- Anne McDonald (politician) (c. 1933–2007), American politician
- Anne McDonald (1961–2010), Australian facilitated communication user
- Anne McElvoy (born 1965), British journalist
- Anne McEnerny-Ogle, American politician and educator
- Anne Hazen McFarland (1868–1930), American physician, editor
- Anne McGihon (born 1957), American attorney and politician
- Anne McGrath (born 1958), Canadian politician and political advisor
- Anne McGuire (born 1949), Scottish politician
- Anne McIntosh (born 1954), British conservative politician
- Anne McKeig (born 1967), American judge
- Anne M. McKim, Scottish-New Zealand academic
- Anne McKnight (1924–2012), American operatic soprano
- Anne McLaren (1927–2007), British scientist
- Anne McLaughlin (born 1966), Scottish politician
- Anne McLean (born 1962), Canadian translator
- Anne McLellan (born 1950), Canadian academic and politician
- Anne Dhu McLucas (1941–2012), American musicologist, ethnomusicologist and administrator
- Anne McNeil (born 1977), American chemist
- Anne McTaggart (born 1970), Scottish SNP politician
- Anne Meacham (1925–2006), American actress
- Anne Meara (1929–2015), American actress and comedian
- Anne Mee (1765–1851), British artist
- Anne-Gudrun Meier-Scherling (1906–2002), German lawyer
- Anne Meiwald (born 1995), English footballer
- Anne K. Mellor (born 1941), American academic
- Anne Meltzer, seismologist
- Anne Julie de Melun (1698–1724), under-governess to the children of France
- Anne Méniane (born 1959), French badminton player
- Anne Mensah, British broadcasting executive
- Anne Briardy Mergen (1906–1994), American editorial cartoonist
- Anne Morrissy Merick (1933–2017), American journalist and war correspondent
- Anne Merklinger (born 1958), Canadian curler
- Anne Merriman (born 1935), British doctor
- Anne Merwin (1887–1962), American screenwriter
- Anne Meskanen, Finnish diplomat
- Anne Meson (born 1975), French show host and singer
- Anne Meulendijks (born 1993), Dutch dressage rider
- Anne Akiko Meyers (born 1970), American violinist
- Anne Meygret (born 1965), French fencer
- Anne Michaels (born 1958), Canadian poet and novelist
- Anne Michalov (1904–2001), American artist
- Anne Michaut (born 1972), French canoeist
- Anne Michel (1959–2023), Belgian sprinter
- Anne Dorte Michelsen (born 1958), Danish musician
- Anne Midgette (born 1965), American music critic
- Anne Migliosi (born 1965), Norwegian handball player
- Anne-Laure Mignerey (born 1973), French cross-country skier
- Anne Milano Appel, American translator
- Anne Milgram (born 1970), American attorney and academic
- Anne Millier, American ice dancer
- Anne Mills Archbold (1873–1968), American philanthropist
- Anne Mills (born 1951), British authority on health economics
- Anne Milton (born 1955), British independent politician
- Anne Minter (born 1963), Australian tennis player
- Anne Moffat (born 1958), Scottish politician
- Anne Molin Kongsgård (born 1977), Norwegian snowboarder
- Anne-Sophie Mondière (born 1979), French judoka
- Anne E. Monius (1964–2019), American Indologist and religious scholar
- Anne Shannon Monroe (1873–1942), American writer and lecturer
- Anne Montminy (born 1975), Canadian diver
- Anne Marie Louise d'Orléans, Duchess of Montpensier (1627–1693), French memoirist
- Anne Moody (1940–2015), American civil rights activist and writer
- Anne Lamy Mook (born 1947), American politician
- Anne Shannon Monroe (1873–1942), American writer
- Anne C. Morel (died 1984), American mathematician
- Anne Morelli (born 1948), Italian-Belgian historian
- Anne Morrison Chapin (1892–1967), American playwright, actress and screenwriter
- Anne Morrow Lindbergh (1906–2001), American author and aviator
- Anne Eve Mortier de Trévise (1829–1900), French courtier
- Anne de Mortimer (1388–1411), Medieval English noble
- Anne Morton (born 1937), British swimmer
- Anne Moscona, American virologist
- Anne-Elisabeth Moutet (born 1959), French journalist, writer and columnist
- Anne-Sylvie Mouzon (1956–2013), Belgian politician
- Anne Mozley (1809–1891), British author and critic
- Anne Mroczkowski (born 1953), Canadian TV reporter and news anchor
- Anne Mueller (1930–2000), British civil servant
- Anne Nyokabi Muhoho (died 2006), Jomo Kenyatta family
- Anne M. Mulcahy (born 1952), former CEO of Xerox Corporation
- Anne Müller (born 1983), German handball player
- Anne Mungai (born 1957), Kenyan film director
- Anne Muraya, Kenyan accountant and corporate executive
- Anne Murray (cricketer) (born 1961), Irish cricketer
- Anne Murray (born 1945), Canadian singer
- Anne Murray Dike (1878–1929), American doctor and chair of the American Committee for Devastated France
- Anne Ratna Mustika (born 1982), Indonesian politician
- Anne Mustoe (1933–2009), British cyclist and writer
- Anne Namakau Mutelo, Namibian diplomat
- Anne-Sophie Mutter (born 1963), German violinist
- Anne Muxel (born 1956), French sociologist
- Anne Marthe Mvoto, Cameroonian journalist and politician
- Anne Nafstad Lyftingsmo (born 1968), Norwegian civil servant
- Anne Nagel (1915–1966), American actress
- Anne Nakamura (born 1987), Japanese actress, model and tarento
- Anne M. Nardacci (born 1977), American judge
- Anne Taylor Nash (1884–1968), American painter
- Anne Nasimiyu Wasike (died 2018), Ugandan Catholic theologian, religious sister and author
- Anne Nasmyth (1798–1874), Scottish artist
- Anne Nason, American golfer
- Anne L. Nathan, American actress and singer
- Anne Naysmith (1937–2015), British pianist
- Anne-Louise-Germaine Necker (1766–1817), French writer and philosopher, known as Madame de Staël
- Anne Neely (born 1946), American painter
- Anne Neu Brindley, American politician
- Anne Neuberger (born 1976), American cybersecurity official
- Anne B. Newman (born 1955), American research scientist focusing on Geriatrics, Gerontology and Epidemiology
- Anne Ngo (born 1984), Cameroonian handball player
- Anne Ngu, Australian-American computer scientist
- Anne Nichols (1891–1966), American playwright
- Anne Dot Eggers Nielsen (born 1975), Danish footballer and journalist
- Anne Skare Nielsen, Danish futurist
- Anne Nivat (born 1969), French journalist and war correspondent
- Anne-Claire Niver (born 1990), American singer songwriter
- Anne Njemanze, Nigerian actress
- Anne de Noailles (1729–1794), French noblewoman and court official
- Anne Noble (born 1954), New Zealand photographer
- Anne Noë (born 1959), Belgian footballer and coach
- Anne Noggle (1922–2005), American aviator and photographer
- Anne Nolan (born 1950), Irish musician
- Anne Nørdsti (born 1977), Norwegian singer
- Anne Northup (born 1948), American politician
- Anne van den Nouweland, Dutch-American game theorist
- Anne Nunes (born 1969), US lawn bowls international
- Anne Nurmi (born 1968), Finnish musical artist
- Anne Monique Nuyt, Canadian pediatrician
- Anne-Pia Nygård (born 1977), Norwegian writer
- Anne Mireille Nzouankeu, Cameroonian journalist
- Anne-Maree O'Connor, New Zealand investment banker
- Anne Odenmarck (born 1955), Norwegian politician
- Anne O'Garra (born 1954), British immunologist
- Anne Ogborn (born 1959), American transgender rights activist
- Anne Øland (1949–2015), Danish musician
- Anne Oldeland (died 1602), 16th-century Danish woman
- Anne Oldfield (1683–1730), English actress
- Anne Olivier Bell (1916–2018), English art scholar
- Anne van Olst (born 1962), Danish equestrian
- Anne Onken (born 1977), German radio presenter and comedian
- Anne Openshaw, Canadian actress
- Anne Cecilie Ore (born 1978), Norwegian paralympic athlete
- Anne Orford, Australian International law scholar
- Anne Ormisson (born 1942), Estonian medical researcher and physician
- Anne Ormrod (born 1987), New Zealand footballer
- Anne Oskarsson (born 1946), Swedish politician
- Anne Osmundson (born 1957), American politician
- Anne Honoré Østergaard (born 1981), Danish politician
- Anne-Sofie Østvedt (1920–2009), Norwegian resistance member
- Anne Oterholm (born 1964), Norwegian writer
- Anne Ottenbrite (born 1966), Canadian swimmer
- Anne Sofie von Otter (born 1955), Swedish mezzo-soprano
- Anne Désirée Ouloto (born 1966), Ivorian politician
- Anne Packard (born 1933), American artist
- Anne Pakoa (born 1969), Ni-Vanuatu human rights activist
- Anne Paluver (born 1952), Estonian actress
- Anne Pang (born 1958), Australian kung fu practitioner
- Anne Panning, American writer
- Anne Panter (born 1984), English field hockey player
- Anne Panther (born 1982), German FIBA basketball official
- Anne Paolucci (1926–2012), American dramatist
- Anne Paradise Hansford (1924–2021), American basketball player
- Anne Parillaud (born 1960), French actress
- Anne-Lise Parisien (born 1972), American alpine skier
- Anne Parrish (1888–1957), American writer
- Anne Parrish (philanthropist) (1760–1800), American philanthropist
- Anne Spencer Parry (c. 1931–1985), Australian writer
- Anne Pars (c. 1750–after 1787), British artist
- Anne Parsons (c. 1735–1814/1815), British courtesan and political mistress
- Anne Pashley (1935–2016), British sprinter and opera singer
- Anne Pasternak (born 1964), American museum curator
- Anne E. Patrick (1941–2016), American theologian
- Anne Patrizio (died 2019), Scottish activist
- Anne Pattel-Gray, Indigenous Australian theologian and academic
- Anne Pattrick (1881–1937), New Zealand plunket nurse and nursing administrator
- Anne Pätzke (born 1982), German illustrator and writer
- Anne Patzwald (born 1989), German wheelchair basketball player
- Anne Paulin (born 1988), Danish politician
- Anne Paulsen (born 1936), Massachusetts politician
- Anne-Maree Pearse, Australian cytogeneticist
- Anne Mette Pedersen (born 1992), Danish handball player
- Anne Rygh Pedersen (born 1967), Norwegian politician and former mayor of Tønsberg municipality
- Anne Peichert (born 1996), French singer, songwriter and actress, known as Louane Emera
- Anne-Sophie Pelletier (born 1976), French politician
- Anne Penesco, French musicologist, academic and biographer
- Anne Penny (1729–1784), British poet and translator
- Anne Pépin (c. 1747–1837), Senegalese Signare
- Anne Perera, Sri Lankan New Zealand food scientist
- Anne Perry (1938–2023), English author
- Anne C. Perry (born 1947), American politician
- Anne Petera (born 1952), American politician
- Anne L. Peters, American doctor
- Anne Peters (born 1964), German-Swiss jurist
- Anne Peyroche, French biologist and geneticist
- Anne Phelan (1948–2019), Australian actress
- Anne-Sophie Pic (born 1969), French chef
- Anne Piehl (born 1964), American ecologist and criminologist
- Anne Pigalle, French singer and musician
- Anne Pincus (born 1961), Australian artist and sculptor
- Anne Pingeot (born 1943), French art historian
- Anne-Malène Piper (1819–1875), Swedish court official
- Anne Piquereau (born 1964), French hurdler
- Anne de Pisseleu d'Heilly (1508–1580), French duchess
- Anne Pitoniak (1922–2007), American actress
- Anne Plant, American biochemist
- Anne Plichota (born 1968), French children's author
- Anne Plumptre (c. 1760–1818), English writer and translator
- Anne Plunkett (born 1952), Australian diplomat
- Anne Poelina, Nyikina traditional custodian
- Anne Pohjola (born 1985), Finnish ringette player
- Anne Poiret (born 1976), French journalist and documentary filmmaker
- Anne Claire Poirier (born 1932), Canadian film producer
- Anne Poleska (born 1980), German swimmer
- Anne Polinario (born 1979), Canadian Paralympic swimmer
- Anne Poyard-Vatrican, Monegasque politician
- Anne Poor (1918–2002), American artist
- Anne Portugal (born 1949), French poet
- Anne Boutiaut Poulard (1851–1931), French cook and innkeeper
- Anne Poulet (born 1942), American art historian
- Anne Powell (born 1973), Australian curler
- Anne Power, British Emerita Professor of Social Policy at LSE
- Anne B. Poyntz, English writer
- Anne Pratt (1806–1893), English painter
- Anne Press (1903–1992), Australian politician
- Anne Pressly (1982–2008), American news anchor
- Anne Preven (born 1965), American singer
- Anne Pride (1942–1990), American feminist
- Anne Priestley (1932–2020), American politician
- Anne Pringle (born 1955), British diplomat
- Anne Provoost (born 1964), Flemish author
- Anne Purvis (born 1959), Scottish middle-distance runner
- Anne Minh-Thu Quach (born 1982), Canadian politician
- Anne Quast (born 1937), American amateur golfer
- Anne Quatrano (born 1959), American chef
- Anne Queffélec (born 1948), French classical pianist
- Anne Quemere (born 1966), French sailor
- Anne Quinlan (1839–1923), Irish-born Canadian educator
- Anne Quist (born 1957), Dutch rower
- Anne Quito, design reporter and architecture critic
- Anne Rabbitte (born 1973), Irish politician
- Anne Rafferty (born 1950), English jurist
- Anne B. Ragde (born 1957), Norwegian novelist
- Anne Ramberg (born 1952), Swedish lawyer
- Anne Ramsay (born 1960), American actress
- Anne Ramsden (born 1952), Canadian artist
- Anne Ramsey (1929–1988), American actress
- Anne Rand (born 1946), American politician
- Anne Randall (born 1944), American model and actress
- Anne Rapp, American screenwriter
- Anne Rasa (1940–2020), British ethologist
- Anne Ravi, Indian film producer
- Anne Warfield Rawls (born 1950), American sociologist
- Anne Raymond (born 1955), American paleontologist
- Anne Rearick (born 1960), American photographer
- Anne Elizabeth Rector (1899–1970), American painter
- Anne Redpath (1895–1965), Scottish painter
- Anne Reemann (born 1962), Estonian actress
- Anne Rees-Mogg, British film director and teacher
- Anne Ceridwen Rees (1874–1905), Welsh physician
- Anne Reeve Aldrich (1866–1892), American poet and novelist
- Anne Reid (born 1935), English actress
- Anne Renaud (athlete) (born 1970), French hurdler
- Anne Renaud, Canadian writer
- Anne Renée (born 1950), Canadian pop singer
- Anne-Gaëlle Retout (born 1980), French athlete
- Anne Revere (1903–1990), American actress
- Anne Rey (1944–2012), French musicologist, pianist and journalist
- Anne-Flore Rey (born 1962), French alpine skier
- Anne Rice (1941–2021), American author
- Anne Estelle Rice (1877–1959), American sculptor
- Anne C. Richard, American diplomat
- Anne de Richelieu (c. 1622–1684), French court official
- Anne Ridler (1912–2001), English poet and editor
- Anne Ridley (born 1963), professor of Cell Biology
- Anne Riemersma (born 1954), Dutch cyclist
- Anne Rigney, Irish artist
- Anne Eline Riisnæs (born 1951), Norwegian pianist and piano pedagog
- Anne Rikala (born 1977), Finnish sprint canoeist
- Anne Rimoin (born 1970), infectious disease epidemiologist
- Anne Rittenhouse (1867–1932), American journalist
- Anne Louise Gregory Ritter (1868–1929), American artist and art teacher
- Anne Rivers Siddons (1936–2019), American novelist
- Anne Robb (born 1959), British alpine skier
- Anne Robillard (born 1955), Canadian novelist
- Anne de Rochechouart de Mortemart (1847–1933), French aristocrat
- Anne Roe (1904–1991), American psychologist
- Anne Rogers Minor (1864–1947), American clubwoman
- Anne Rogers (born 1933), English actress, singer and dancer
- Anne de Rohan (1584–1646), French poet
- Anne Roiphe (born 1935), American novelist
- Anne Rollo (born 1965), Australian professional golfer
- Anne Roselle (1894–1989), American opera singer
- Anne Rosellini, American film producer and screenwriter
- Anne Rosenberg, American surgical oncologist
- Anne Rosenzweig, American chef and restaurateur
- Anne Rossignol (1730–1810), slave trader
- Anne Roumanoff (born 1965), French comedian and actress
- Anne Rouse (born 1954), American-British poet
- Anne Roussel (born 1960), French actress
- Anne Rowse (born 1931), New Zealand dancer
- Anne Royall (1769–1854), American journalist
- Anne Rud (died 1533), Danish noble and landholder
- Anne Rudge (1761–1836), British artist
- Anne Rudin (1924–2021), American politician
- Anne Rudloe (1947–2012), American marine biologist
- Anne Helen Rui (born 1950), Norwegian politician
- Anne de Ruiter (born 1999), Dutch cyclist
- Anne Rundle (1920–1989), British novelist
- Anne Rushout (c. 1767–1849), British artist
- Anne E. Russon (born 1947), Canadian psychologist
- Anne Ruston (born 1963), Australian politician
- Anne-Françoise Rutkowski (born 1970), French psychologist
- Anne Ruwet (born 1950), American politician
- Anne Ryan (artist) (1889–1954), American painter
- Anne Ryan (actress) (born 1969), American actress
- Anne-Lie Rydé (born 1956), Swedish pop and rock singer
- Anne Lise Ryel (born 1958), Norwegian jurist and politician
- Anne Ryg (born 1967), Norwegian actress
- Anne Ryman, American journalist
- Anne Sadleir (1585–c. 1671), English literary patron
- Anne Said (1914–1995), British painter
- Anne Sakdinawat, physicist
- Anne Salmond (architect), New Zealand architect
- Anne Salmond (born 1945), New Zealand anthropologist and writer
- Anne Salomon (born 1974), Canadian applied marine biologist
- Anne Mette Samdal (born 1971), Norwegian wheelchair curler and ice sledge speed skater
- Anne Samplonius (born 1968), Canadian road cyclist
- Anne Sander (born 1973), French economist and politician
- Anne Sanders (born 1931), English cricketer
- Anne Sandum (born 1973), Norwegian politician
- Anne Šaraškin (1938–2025), Estonian figure skater
- Anne Sargeant (born 1957), Australian netball player
- Anne Sargent (1923–2007), American actress
- Anne-Louise Sarks, Australian theatre director, writer and actor
- Anne-Fleur Sautour (born 1975), French canoeist
- Anne Sauvagnargues (born 1961), French philosopher
- Anne Savedge, American photographer
- Anne Saxelby (1981–2021), American cheesemonger
- Anne Sayre (1923–1998), American writer
- Anne Schaefer (scientist), German neuroscientist
- Anne Schaefer (1870–1957), American actress
- Anne Schäfer (born 1987), German tennis player
- Anne Schedeen (born 1949), American television actress
- Anne Scheiber (1893–1995), American businesswoman
- Anne Schellekens (born 1986), Dutch rower
- Anne Schilling, American mathematician
- Anne Schleper (born 1990), American ice hockey player
- Anne Schoettle (born 1959), American writer
- Anne M. Schot (born 1966), Dutch botanist
- Anne Schreiter, social scientist
- Anne Schröder (born 1994), German field hockey player
- Anne Schuchat (born 1960), American physician
- Anne Schumann, German violinist
- Anne van Schuppen (born 1960), Dutch long-distance runner
- Anne Schwanewilms (born 1967), German lyric soprano
- Anne Schwegmann-Fielding (born 1967), British sculptor and mosaic artist
- Anne A. Scitovsky, American health economist
- Anne Scripps (1946–1994), American heiress to the E. W. Scripps Company
- Anne Seagrave, Irish live/performance artist
- Anne Seagrim (1914–2011), British secretary to C. P. Snow and the Duke of Windsor
- Anne Sebba (born 1951), British writer
- Anne Seibel, French art director
- Anne-Lise Seip (born 1933), Norwegian historian and former politician
- Anne Semple (died 1987), American poet
- Anne Sender (born 1956), Norwegian lecturer and debater
- Anne Serre (born 1960), French writer
- Anne Sewitsky (born 1978), Norwegian film director
- Anne Sexton (1928–1974), American poet
- Anne Shadwell, English actress
- Anne Sharpley (1928–1989), English journalist
- Anne Shaver, American literary scholar
- Anne Sheehan, seismologist
- Anne Shelby (born 1948), American writer
- Anne Shibuya, Brazilian curler
- Anne Shilcock (1932–2019), British tennis player
- Anne Shirley (1918–1993), American actress
- Anne Shongwe, Kenyan entrepreneur and UN civil servant
- Anne C. Shreffler (born 1957), American musicologist
- Anne Shymer (1879–1915), American chemist
- Anne Sicard, French politician
- Anne-Gaëlle Sidot (born 1979), French tennis player
- Anne Silverman, American bio mechanical engineer
- Anne Simmons, Australian biomedical engineer
- Anne Simon (born 1956), American biologist
- Anne Simon (bowls), Guernsey international lawn bowler
- Anne W. Simon (1914–1996), American writer and environmentalist
- Anne Simonett (1952–1995), American judge
- Anne Hege Simonsen (born 1965), Norwegian social anthropologist and journalist
- Anne Simpkin (born 1969), British tennis player
- Anne Simpson, Canadian poet
- Anne Benna Sims, American danseuse
- Anne Sinclair (born 1948), French television and radio interviewer
- Anne Skelbæk (born 1990), Danish badminton player
- Anne Skinner (born 1954), Australian equestrian
- Anne Brit Skjæveland (born 1962), Norwegian heptathlete
- Anne Slavotinek, Australian chess player
- Anne Snelgrove (born 1957), British Labour politician
- Anne Solsvik (born 1981), Norwegian politician
- Anne Søndergaard (born 1973), Danish badminton player
- Anne-Mette Sørensen (born 1947), Danish tennis player
- Anne-Monika Spallek (born 1968), German politician
- Anne Spang (born 1967), German biochemist, cell biologist and professor
- Anne Speckhard, counter-terrorism researcher
- Anne Speir, TV producer from New Zealand
- Anne Spiegel (born 1980), German politician, Federal Minister for Family Affairs
- Anne Spielberg (born 1949), American screenwriter
- Anne Whiston Spirn (born 1947), American landscape architect, photographer and author
- Anne Spurkland, Norwegian professor of immunology
- Anne M. Squire (1920–2017), 31st Moderator of the United Church of Canada (1986–1988)
- Anne St John, English aristocrat and courtier
- Anne St. Marie (1926–1986), American fashion model
- Anne Stallybrass (1938–2021), British actress
- Anne Stambach-Terrenoir (born 1980), French politician
- Anne Stanback (born 1958), American activist
- Anne State (born 1969), American journalist
- Anne Statt, English badminton player
- Anne Stava-Murray, American politician
- Anne Stears, South African cricketer
- Anne Stedman (born 1976), American actress
- Anne Steele (1717–1778), English hymnwriter, essayist
- Anne-Lise Steinbach (born 1935), Norwegian politician
- Anne C. Steinemann, American civil and environmental engineering academic
- Anne Elisabeth Stengl (born 1986), American novelist
- Anne Stenhammer (born 1950), Norwegian politician
- Anne-Lise Stern (1921–2013), French psychoanalyst
- Anne Stevenson (1933–2020), British-American poet
- Anne Steytler, American activist and feminist
- Anne Stokes, British artist
- Anne K. Stokowski (1925–2020), American politician
- Anne Storch (born 1968), German linguist in African studies
- Anne Grethe Stormorken (born 1969), Dutch sports shooter
- Anne Brit Stråtveit (born 1947), Norwegian teacher and politician
- Anne Penfold Street (1932–2016), Australian mathematician
- Anne Strésor (1651–c. 1713), French painter and nun
- Anne Strieber (1946–2015), American novelist
- Anne-Karine Strøm (born 1951), Norwegian singer
- Anne Margrethe Strømsheim (c. 1914–2008), member of the Norwegian resistance
- Anne Sudworth, British artist
- Anne Suinner-Lawoyin, Nigerian model
- Anne Sulling (born 1976), Estonian politician
- Anne Summers (born 1945), Australian writer and journalist
- Anne Sundberg, American film director, screenwriter and producer
- Anne Surkowski (1923–2020), Canadian baseball player
- Anne F. Sutton (1942–2022), British historian
- Anne Kjersti Suvdal (born 1987), Norwegian handball player
- Anne Suzuki (born 1987), Japanese actress
- Anne Svingheim, Norwegian orienteer
- Anne Swainson, American product and graphic designer
- Anne Swap, US Navy admiral
- Anne Swarbrick, Canadian politician
- Anne Swärd (born 1969), Swedish writer
- Anne Sweeney (born 1957), American businesswoman, co-chair of Disney Media
- Anne Swithinbank, British gardener
- Anne Kristin Sydnes (1956–2017), Norwegian politician
- Anne Sylvestre (1934–2020), French singer-songwriter
- Anne Symonds (1916–2017), English broadcaster
- Anne Szumigalski (1922–1999), Canadian poet
- Anne Tabachnick (1927–1995), American expressionist painter
- Anne Dorthe Tanderup (born 1972), Danish handball player
- Anne Burnett Tandy, American heiress, rancher, horsebreeder, philanthropist and art collector
- Anne-Lise Tangstad (1935–1981), Norwegian actress
- Anne Tanqueray, English silversmith
- Anne Carine Tanum (born 1954), Norwegian business executive
- Anne Taormina, Belgian mathematical physicist
- Anne Tardos (born 1943), French-born American poet, visual artist, academic and professor
- Anne Tauber (born 1995), Dutch cross-country mountain biker
- Anne Tenney, Australian actress
- Anne Terpstra (born 1991), Dutch cross-country mountain biker
- Anne Terrier Laffaille, French composer
- Anne Thackeray Ritchie (1837–1919), English writer and literary custodian
- Anne Thayer (born 1961), American politician from South Carolina
- Anne-Sophie Thilo (born 1987), Swiss sailor
- Anne Thommessen (1880–1968), Norwegian politician
- Anne Lolk Thomsen (born 1983), Danish rower
- Anne Thomson, British military nurse, matron and nursing administrator
- Anne Thorius (born 1977), Danish basketball player
- Anne Thorne (born 1928), British physicist
- Anne Thornton (born 1981), American pastry chef and food writer
- Anne Kristine Thorsby (born 1962), Norwegian artist
- Anne Throckmorton (c. 1664–1734), English poet
- Anne Tilloy (born 1980), French musical artist
- Anne de Tinguy (born 1950), French historian
- Anne Tolley (born 1953), New Zealand politician
- Anne Tompkins, American attorney
- Anne Tønnessen (born 1974), Norwegian footballer
- Anne Karin Torheim (born 1953), Norwegian poet and novelist
- Anne de Tourville (1910–2004), French writer
- Anne-Lise Touya (born 1981), French fencer
- Anne Trabant-Haarbach (born 1949), German footballer
- Anne Tran (born 1996), French badminton player
- Anne Traum (born 1969), American judge
- Lady Anne Tree (1927–2010), British philanthropist and prison visitor
- Anne Trefethen, computer scientist
- Anne Tréhu, American geophysicist
- Anne Treisman (1935–2018), English cognitive psychologist
- Anne Tremko (born 1968), American actress
- Anne Trevor, Baroness Trevor (died 1746), English aristocrat and philanthropist
- Anne Triola (1920–2012), American actress
- Anne Sjerp Troelstra (1939–2019), Dutch mathematician
- Anne Tropper, physics professor
- Anne Trubek, American author and publisher
- Anne Truitt (1921–2004), American sculptor
- Anne S. Tsui, American professor of international management
- Anne Wilkes Tucker (born 1945), American curator of photography
- Anne Mary Kobugabe Tumwine, Ugandan politician
- Anne Tuomanen (born 1987), Finnish ice hockey player
- Anne Turyn (born 1954), American photographer
- Anne Vilde Tuxen (born 1998), Norwegian diver
- Anne Beathe Tvinnereim (born 1974), Norwegian diplomat and politician
- Anne Twysden (1574–1638), English writer
- Anne Tyler (born 1941), American writer and literary critic
- Anne Tyng (1920–2011), American architect
- Anne Ulrich (born 1966), German biochemist
- Anne Upton, American composer and radio writer
- Anne Urquhart (born 1957), Australian politician
- Anne Ursu, American novelist
- Anne Vabarna (1877–1964), Estonian folk singer
- Anne Vainikka (1958–2018), Finnish-American linguist
- Anne Valente, American writer
- Anne Valery (1926–2013), English screenwriter, author and actress
- Anne Vallayer-Coster (1744–1818), French artist
- Anne Vallée (1958–1982), Canadian biologist
- Anne Van Parijs (born 1944), Belgian swimmer
- Anne-Sophie Van Regemortel (born 1984), Belgian field hockey player
- Anne-Sophie Vanden Borre (born 2001), Belgian field hockey player
- Anne Vanderlove (1939–2019), French-Dutch singer and songwriter
- Anne Vanschothorst (born 1974), Dutch harpist and composer
- Anne Vaux (c. 1562 – in or after 1637), Catholic recusant
- Anne Veenendaal (born 1995), Dutch field hockey player
- Anne Veesaar (born 1957), Estonian actress
- Anne Vegter (born 1958), Dutch poet, playwright and writer of children's literature
- Anne Vernon (born 1924), French actress
- Anne Veski (born 1956), Estonian pop singer
- Anne-Laure Viard (born 1981), French canoe racer
- Anne Viriato (born 1997), Brazilian mixed martial arts fighter
- Anne McConaghie Volp (1921–2010), American field hockey player
- Anne Von Bertouch (1915–2015), Australian art dealer, author, environmentalist and art gallery director
- Anne Nicole Voullemier (1796–1886), French painter
- Anne Vyalitsyna (born 1986), Russian-American model
- Anne Wagner (born 1949), American art historian
- Anne Wahl (born 1953), Norwegian canoeist
- Anne Waiguru (born 1971), Kenyan politician
- Anne Waldman (born 1945), American poet
- Anne Waldschmidt (born 1958), German sociologist
- Anne Wallace (born 1970), Australian painter
- Anne Tolstoi Wallach (1929–2018), American advertising executive and author
- Anne Walmsley (born 1931), British editor, critic and author
- Anne Walsh (born 1962), American visual artist
- Anne Walton (born 1951), Canadian swimmer
- Anne Wamuratha, Kenyan politician
- Anne-Lise Wang (1920–1967), Norwegian actress
- Anne Warburton (1927–2015), British diplomat
- Anne Lise Wærness (born 1951), Norwegian high jumper
- Anne Warren Weston (1812–c. 1890), American abolitionist
- Anne Warren, child pop singer
- Anne Washburn, American playwright
- Anne Watanabe 渡辺杏 (Anne/杏) (born 1986), Japanese model and actress, known as "Anne"
- Anna Christian Waters, American child missing since 1973
- Anne Watson (mathematics educator), British mathematician
- Anne Watson, American teacher and politician
- Anne Webster (born 1959), Australian politician
- Anne Wenzel (born 1972), German sculptor and installation artist
- Anne Werner (born 1979), German actress
- Anne Westfall, American game programmer and software developer
- Anne Wexler (1930–2009), American activist
- Anne-Sophie Weyns (born 1995), Belgian field hockey player
- Anne Hollingsworth Wharton (1845–1928), American writer and historian
- Anne Wharton (1659–1685), English poet
- Anne Whateley, woman alleged to have been the intended wife of Shakespeare
- Anne Wheeler (born 1946), Canadian film director
- Anne E. White, American physicist
- Anne Terry White (1896–1980), American writer
- Anne White (born 1961), American tennis player
- Anne Whitehead (c. 1624–1686), English Quaker preacher
- Anne Whitfield (1928–2024), American actress
- Anne Whitney (1821–1915), American sculptor
- Anne-Frédérique Widmann, Swiss journalist and director
- Anne van de Wiel (born 1997), Dutch athlete
- Anne Wienholt (1920–2018), Australian artist
- Anne Pierson Wiese (born 1964), American writer
- Anne Wignall (1912–1982), English socialite and author
- Anne Wilkinson (1910–1961), Canadian poet and writer
- Anne Will (born 1966), German television journalist and host
- Anne Willan (born 1938), English chef and writer
- Anne Walsh Willer (1923–2017), American politician
- Anne Wingate (1943–2021), American novelist
- Anne Winton (1949–1982), American ballerina, martial artist and actress
- Anne Withington (1867–1933), American activist
- Anne Wizorek (born 1981), German journalist, author and feminist
- Anne Tingelstad Wøien (born 1965), Norwegian politician
- Anne Wojcicki (born 1973), American entrepreneur
- Anne Wolden-Ræthinge (1929–2016), Danish biographer, journalist and writer
- Anne Woodville (c. 1438–1489), English noblewoman
- Anne Woolliams (1926–1999), English artistic director, ballet choreographer, dancer and teacher
- Anne Eyre Worboys, New Zealand or British writer
- Anne Worsley (1588–1644), English Catholic nun
- Anne Wyllie (born 1985), New Zealand microbiologist and epidemiologist
- Anne Wyndham (c. 1741–1814), American television actress
- Anne de Xainctonge (1567–1621), French religious sister
- Anne Yeats (1919–2001), Irish painter
- Anne Yelsey (born 1985), American tennis player
- Anne D. Yoder (born 1959), American biologist, researcher and professor
- Anne Oi-kan Yue, professor of the Chinese language
- Anne Zagré (born 1990), Belgian sprinter
- Anne Zahalka (born 1957), Australian photographer
- Anne Zelensky (born 1935) French feminist author and activist
- Anne Zeller, American anthropologist
- Anne Zenoni (born 1971), French footballer
- Anne Zerr (born 1954), American politician
- Anne S. Zickus (born 1939), American businesswoman and politician
- Anne Ziegler (1910–2003), English singer
- Anne Zink, French historian
- Anne Zouroudi, British novelist
- Anne van Zyl, South African educator academic

=== Ann ===
- Ann (singer) (born 1991), Taiwanese singer-songwriter
- Ann Kristin Aarønes (born 1973), Norwegian footballer
- Ann-Mari Aasland (1915–2008), Norwegian politician
- Ann J. Abadie (1939–2024), American academic
- Ann Abraham (born 1952), English public servant
- Ann-Kristin Achleitner (born 1966), German economist
- Ann Adams, American artist
- Ann-Mari Adamsson (1934–2011), Swedish actress
- Ann Agee, American visual artist
- Ann Aguirre (born 1970), American author of speculative fiction
- Ann-Christin Ahlberg (born 1957), Swedish politician
- Ann-Margret Ahlstrand (1905–2001), Swedish high jumper
- Ann Ahmed, Laotian-American chef and restaurateur
- Ann Aiken (born 1951), American judge
- Ann Aldrich (1927–2010), American judge
- Ann Allebach (1874–1918), American Mennonite professor
- Ann-Sofie Alm (born 1971), Swedish politician
- Ann S. Almgren, American mathematician
- Ann Althouse (born 1951), American law professor and blogger
- Ann Aluoch (born 1990), Kenyan football player and manager
- Ann-Charlotte Alverfors (1947–2018), Swedish writer
- Ann Andrews (1890–1986), American actress
- Ann Catrin Apstein-Müller (born 1973), German poet and translator
- Ann Arensberg (1937–2022), American author
- Ann Arleklo (born 1953), Swedish politician
- Ann Arvin, American pediatrician
- Ann Aschengrau, epidemiologist
- Ann Ashmead, American archaeologist
- Ann W. Astell (born 1952), American theologian
- Ann Atwater (1935–2016), American civil rights activist
- Ann Augustine (born 1989), Indian film actress
- Ann-Magrit Austenå (born 1961), Norwegian journalist and organizational leader
- Ann Ayars (1918–1995), American soprano and actress
- Ann Ayscough Sands (1761–1851), American educator
- Ann Bagnall (1927–2017), British school teacher and publisher
- Ann E. Bailie, American mathematician
- Ann Baker (singer) (1915–1999), American singer
- Ann Baker (1930–2017), American actress
- Ann Ball (1944–2008), Catholic writer
- Ann Ballin (1932–2003), New Zealand activist
- Ann Bamford, Irish abolitionist in the USA
- Ann Bancroft (born 1955), American author, teacher, adventurer and public speaker
- Ann Banfield, American academic
- Ann Bannon (born 1932), American author
- Ann Barclay, Canadian tennis player
- Ann Barford, American rugby union player
- Ann Barker (civil servant) (born 1946), American public servant working in Britain
- Ann Barker (born 1952), Australian politician
- Ann Barner, English swimmer
- Ann Barnes (1945–2005), American actress
- Ann Barnes (police commissioner) (born 1945), British police commissioner
- Ann Barr Snitow (1943–2019), American feminist activist, writer and teacher
- Ann Barr (1929–2015), British journalist and writer
- Ann Barrett (born 1943), British oncologist
- Ann Bartel (born 1949), American labor economist
- Ann Bartuska (born 1953), American ecologist and biologist
- Ann-Sophie Barwich, German cognitive scientist, philosopher and historian of science
- Ann Barzel (1905–2007), American writer, critic and lecturer
- Ann Baskett, British actress
- Ann Baskins (born 1955), American lawyer
- Ann Bassett (1878–1956), American rancher
- Ann Bateman (1748–1813), British artist
- Ann Bates, American spy
- Ann Bathurst, 17th century English diarist and prophet
- Ann Battelle (born 1968), American freestyle skier
- Ann Batten (born 1944), New Zealand politician
- Ann Batten Cristall (1769–1848), English poet and schoolteacher
- Ann Bauer (born 1966), American novelist and essayist
- Ann Baynard, 17th century English philosopher
- Ann Beach (1938–2017), British actress
- Ann Beaglehole, New Zealand writer and politician
- Ann Beattie (born 1947), American novelist and short story writer
- Ann Beckett (1927–2002), first qualified occupational therapist employed in Ireland
- Ann Beddingfield (1742–1763), English murderer
- Ann Bedsole (1930–2025), American politician
- Ann Beha (born 1950), American architect
- Ann Behrenfors (born 1961), Swedish equestrian
- Ann Bell (born 1938), British actress
- Ann-Kathrin Bendixen, German world traveler, internet celebrity and author
- Ann Beretta, American punk band
- Ann-Katrin Berger (born 1990), German footballer
- Ann Bermingham (born 1948), American art historian
- Ann A. Bernatitus (1912–2003), U. S. Navy decorated combat nurse
- Ann Bernstein, South African commentator
- Ann E. Berthoff (1924–2022), scholar of composition
- Ann-Sophie Bettez (born 1987), Canadian ice hockey player
- Ann Biderman (born 1951), American film and television writer
- Ann-Maree Biggar, Australian television presenter
- Ann West Bignall, American actress
- Ann Willing Bingham (1764–1801), American socialite
- Ann Birstein (1927–2017), American novelist
- Ann Bisconti, American scientist and communications expert
- Ann Spence Black (1860–1947), Scottish artist
- Ann Blades (born 1947), Canadian illustrator, writer and illustrator
- Ann M. Blair, American historian
- Ann Blake, Irish theatre practitioner and musician
- Ann Blandford, British professor
- Ann Blaykling (fl. 1652–1708), Quaker preacher
- Ann Eliza Bleecker (1752–1783), American poet and correspondent
- Ann Blyth (born 1928), American actress
- Ann Merchant Boesgaard (born 1939), astronomer at the University of Hawaii
- Ann Bogan, American singer
- Ann-Sophie Bohm-Eisenbrandt (born 1993), German politician
- Ann Boleyn (born 1960), American singer
- Ann Bollin (born 1960), American politician
- Ann Bostrom, American policy analyst
- Ann Bowditch (born 1971), Guernsey cyclist
- Ann Bowers (1936–2024), American business executive and philanthropist
- Ann Bowtell (born 1938), British civil servant
- Ann Walsh Bradley (born 1950), American judge
- Ann Weaver Bradley (1834–1913), American educator, temperance worker, and writer
- Ann Brannon (born 1958), British fencer
- Ann Brashares (born 1967), American YA author
- Ann Breault (1938–2021), Canadian politician
- Ann Breen, Irish singer
- Ann Bressington (born 1955), Australian politician
- Ann Brewster (1918–2005), American cartoonist
- Ann Bridge (1889–1974), English writer and mountain climber
- Ann Preston Bridgers (1891–1967), American actress
- Ann-Kio Briggs (born 1952), English-born Nigerian activist
- Ann Brill, American journalism academic
- Ann Brockman (writer) (died 1660), English writer on medicine
- Ann Brockman (1895–1943), American painter
- Ann Brody (1884–1944), American actress
- Ann Brower, New Zealand environmental geography academic
- Ann Browne (born 1955), West Indian cricketer
- Ann Brunton Merry (1769–1808), English actress
- Ann Bryson (born 1964), British actress
- Ann Buchanan (1941–2022), British sociologist
- Ann Buckley, Irish musicologist
- Ann Bucklin, marine biologist
- Ann Burbrook (born 1965), Australian actress
- Ann Mary Burgess (c. 1861–1943), English Quaker philanthropist
- Ann Burgess (born 1936), American university teacher
- Ann Burnstein, American bridge player
- Ann J. Cahill, American philosopher and academic
- Ann Lowdon Call, American horsewoman
- Ann Thomas Callahan (1935–2023), Canadian Cree nurse
- Ann Callaway (born 1949), American composer
- Ann Callis (born 1964), American judge
- Ann R. Cannon (born 1966), American statistics educator
- Ann Z. Caracristi (1921–2016), cryptanalyst and National Security Agency official
- Ann Cargill (died 1784), British opera singer
- Ann Carlson (born 1954), American dancer
- Ann E. Carlson (born 1960), American attorney and legal scholar
- Ann-Margaret Carrozza (born 1966), American lawyer and politician
- Ann Elizabeth Carson (1929–2023), Canadian poet
- Ann Cartwright, British sociologist
- Ann Casey (1938–2021), American professional wrestler
- Ann King Cashion, American nurse scientist
- Ann Cashion, American chef
- Ann Casson (1915–1990), British actress
- Ann Catley (c. 1745–1789), British singer
- Ann Cavoukian (born 1952), Canadian data privacy researcher and former civil servant
- Ann R. Chaintreuil (born 1947), American architect
- Ann Chamberlin (born 1954), American writer of historical novels
- Ann Mei Chang (born 1967), American non-profit organization executive
- Ann Chester Chandley, cytogeneticist and Fellow of the Royal Society of Edinburgh
- Ann Chapman (1937–2009), New Zealand limnologist
- Ann Charney (born 1940), Canadian writer and journalist
- Ann Charters (born 1936), Professor of American Literature
- Ann Chernow (born 1936), American artist
- Ann Chiang (born 1955), Hong Kong politician
- Ann Chiejine (born 1974), Nigerian footballer
- Ann Y. K. Choi, Canadian author and educator
- Ann Chowning (1929–2016), American anthropologist
- Ann Christopher (born 1947), British sculptor
- Ann Cindric (1922–2010), baseball player
- Ann Cleare, Irish composer
- Ann Cleeves (born 1954), British novelist
- Ann Clemmer (born 1958), American politician
- Ann Clwyd (1937–2023), Welsh politician
- Ann Codee (1890–1961), Belgian actress
- Ann Cody (born 1963), American Paralympic athlete
- Ann Burdette Coe (1874–1947), American tennis player
- Ann Coffey (born 1946), British independent politician
- Ann Cole (1934–1986), American R&B and gospel singer
- Ann Colis (born 1993), Filipino actress and model
- Ann Colloton, American swimmer
- Ann Ree Colton (1898–1984), American writer
- Ann Comerford, Irish camogie player
- Ann Compton (art historian) (born 1956)
- Ann Conolly (1917–2010), British botanist
- Ann Coody (born 1937), American politician
- Ann Copeland (born 1932), American and Canadian writer
- Ann Corcoran (activist), American anti-Muslim activist
- Ann Corcoran (politician) (born 1951), Australian politician
- Ann Corio (1909–1999), American actress and burlesque performer
- Ann Weiser Cornell (born 1949), American author and educator
- Ann Cotten, American-born Austrian writer
- Ann Coulter (born 1961), American conservative political commentator
- Ann K. Covington (born 1942), American judge
- Ann Craig, British artist
- Ann Craven, American painter
- Ann C. Crispin (1950–2013), American science fiction writer
- Ann Crowley (1929–2023), American singer
- Ann Crumb (1950–2019), American actress and singer
- Ann Cryer (born 1939), British politician
- Ann Cudd, American philosopher
- Ann Culy (born 1952), New Zealand jeweler
- Ann Cummings (born 1946), Vermont businesswoman and democratic politician
- Ann Curless (born 1963), American singer
- Ann Curry (born 1956), American journalist
- Ann Curthoys (born 1945), Australian historian and academic
- Ann Cusack (born 1961), American actress
- Ann Cartwright DeCouto (c. 1941–2016), Bermudian politician
- Ann Dainton (born 1940), Welsh lawn bowler
- Ann Dally (1926–2007), English author
- Ann Dandrow (1936–2017), American educator and politician
- Ann Daniels, English polar explorer
- Ann Darr (1920–2007), American writer
- Ann Davey (born 1963), English cyclist
- Ann David-Antoine (born 1949), Grenadian politician
- Ann Rosalie David (born 1946), British Egyptologist
- Ann Day (1938–2016), American politician
- Ann Deas, American hotelier
- Ann Demeulemeester (born 1959), Belgian fashion designer
- Ann Derwin, Irish diplomat
- Ann Desantis, American journalist
- Ann-Renée Desbiens (born 1994), Canadian ice hockey player
- Ann G. DeVore (born 1936), American politician
- Ann Devries (born 1970), Belgian tennis player
- Ann Devroy (1948–1997), American political journalist
- Ann Diamond (born 1951), Canadian poet and novelist
- Ann Diamond (midwife), New Zealand hotel-keeper, storekeeper and midwife
- Ann Didyk, American printmaker
- Ann Dinham (1827–1882), English woman exiled to Australia
- Ann Doherty (c. 1786–c. 1831/1832), English novelist and playwright
- Ann Donahue, television writer
- Ann Donnelly (born 1959), American judge
- Ann Doran (1911–2000), American actress
- Ann Dow (born 1971), Canadian water polo player
- Ann Dowd (born 1956), American actress
- Ann Dowling (born 1952), British engineering professor
- Ann Downer (1960–2015), American novelist
- Ann Downey, Irish camogie player
- Ann Downing (born 1945), American singer
- Ann Drayton, American landowner
- Ann Drummond-Grant (1905–1959), British singer and actress
- Ann Druyan (born 1949), American writer and producer
- Ann Duck (c. 1717–1744), Black British criminal hanged at Tyburn in 1744
- Ann MacIntosh Duff (1925–2022), Canadian artist
- Ann Dummett (1930–2012), British activist
- Ann Dunham (1942–1995), American anthropologist
- Ann Dunnigan (1910–1997), American actress
- Ann E. Dunwoody (born 1953), US Army general, first female to achieve four star rank
- Ann Duplessis, American politician
- Ann Dupuis, American game designer
- Ann Duquesnay, American musical theatre actress, composer and lyricist
- Ann Lawrence Durviaux (1968–2021), Belgian jurist and academic
- Ann Dusenberry (born 1953), American actress
- Ann Mary Dussault (born 1946), American politician in the state of Montana
- Ann-Sophie Duyck (born 1987), Belgian cyclist
- Ann Dvorak (1911–1979), American actress
- Ann Ebsworth (1937–2002), British barrister and judge
- Ann-Mari Edvardsen (born 1973), Norwegian singer and keyboardist
- Ann El Safi, Sudanese journalist, writer and novelist
- Ann E. Elsner, American researcher
- Ann Elwell (1922–1996), British linguist, intelligence officer and diplomat
- Ann Emery (1930–2016), British actress
- Ann-Kristin Engstad (born 1982), Norwegian politician
- Ann Cathrin Eriksen (born 1971), Norwegian handball player
- Ann Eriksson, Canadian author and biologist
- Ann Evers, American actress
- Ann Fabian (born 1949), American historian
- Ann Fairbairn (1901–1972), American author
- Ann Mari Falk (1916–1988), Swedish writer and translator
- Ann, Lady Fanshawe (1625–1680), English memoirist and cookery author
- Ann Faraday, British psychologist
- Ann Farrell, Canadian Paralympic athlete
- Ann Fawcett Story (1846–1911), Australian cookery instructor
- Ann-Margaret Ferrante (born 1972), American politician
- Ann Fienup-Riordan (born 1948), American cultural anthropologist
- Ann Finkbeiner, American science journalist
- Ann Finlayson, English artist
- Ann Firbank (born 1933), British actress
- Ann Kindrick Fischer (1919–1971), American social anthropologist
- Ann Fitz (born 1977), American attorney
- Ann Carroll Fitzhugh (1805–1875), American abolitionist
- Ann Flagg (1924–1970), African-American playwright, stage actress and drama teacher
- Ann Flora Froude Flashman (1911–1961), Australian veterinarian
- Ann Kristin Flatland (born 1982), Norwegian biathlete
- Ann Fleming (1913–1981), English society hostess
- Ann Flood (politician), American politician
- Ann Flood (1932–2022), American actress
- Ann Florini (born 1958), Singaporean academic
- Ann Ford (born 1952), English middle and long-distance runner
- Ann Forrest (1895–1985), Danish-American actress
- Ann Fowler (born 1948), American beauty pageant titleholder
- Ann Fowler Rhoads, American botanist
- Ann Fox Chandonnet (born 1943), American poet
- Ann Smith Franklin (1696–1763), American colonial newspaper printer and publisher
- Ann Fredericks, American politician
- Ann Cottrell Free (1916–2004), American journalist
- Ann Freedman, American art dealer
- Ann-Margreth Frei (born 1942), Swedish figure skater
- Ann Fetter Friedlaender (1938–1992), American economist
- Ann Friedman (born 1982), American journalist, editor and podcaster
- Ann B. Friedman, philanthropist and museum founder
- Ann S. Fulcher, American radiologist and academic
- Ann Galbally, Australian art historian and academic
- Ann Gale, American painter
- Ann Gallagher (born 1967), Irish politician
- Ann-Sofie Gälman, Swedish television presenter and journalist
- Ann Cole Gannett, Massachusetts politician
- Ann Gardner, American glass artist
- Ann Gargett, Canadian physical oceanographer
- Ann Garman (born 1933), American baseball player
- Ann Garry, American feminist philosopher and professor
- Ann-Madeleine Gelotte, Swedish illustrator
- Ann George (1903–1989), English actress
- Ann Gerry (1763–1849), Second Lady of the United States
- Ann Getty (1941–2020), American philanthropist
- Ann-Cathrin Giegerich (born 1992), German handball player
- Ann Gillen, American artist
- Ann Gillespie (politician), American politician
- Ann Gillespie, American actress
- Ann Gillis (1927–2018), American actress
- Ann Fagan Ginger (1925–2025), American legal scholar and human rights activist
- Ann Gleeson, Irish radio personality
- Ann Gloag (born 1942), Scottish businesswoman and activist
- Ann Goddard (1936–2011), British barrister and judge
- Ann Gollifer (born 1960), British-Guyanese artist
- Ann Gomersall (1750–1835), British novelist
- Ann Gosling, British actress
- Ann Govednik (1916–1985), American swimmer
- Ann Granger (1939–2025), British crime writer
- Ann Grant (born 1955), Zimbabwean field hockey player
- Ann Graybiel, American neuroscientist
- Ann Greenly (1852–1927), British geologist
- Ann Greenwood, Australian textile artist
- Ann Gregory (1912–1990), African-American amateur golfer
- Ann Grifalconi (1929–2020), American illustrator and writer
- Ann Warren Griffith (1918–1983), American writer
- Ann Griffiths, Welsh poet and hymnist
- Ann Grocott (born 1938), Australian writer and artist
- Ann Grossman (born 1970), American tennis player
- Ann Hand, American jewelry designer
- Ann Hutchinson Guest (1918–2022), American dance notator
- Ann Gunter (born 1951), American art historian
- Ann Haesebrouck (born 1963), Belgian rower
- Ann E. Hagerman, American chemist and researcher
- Ann Hajek, American entomologist
- Ann Hall (1792–1863), American painter
- Ann Hallenberg (born 1967), Swedish mezzo-soprano
- Ann-Charlotte Hammar Johnsson (born 1966), Swedish politician
- Ann Hampton Callaway (born 1958), American singer
- Ann Harada (born 1964), American actress and singer
- Ann Alexandra Harbuz (1908–1989), Canadian artist
- Ann Harding (1902–1981), American actress
- Ann Harding (economist) (1938–2023), Australian economist and academic
- Ann M. Hardy, American epidemiologist and microbiologist
- Ann Hardy (1933–2023), American computer programmer, pioneer of computer time-sharing systems
- Ann Harithas (1941–2021), American art collector
- Ann Harleman (born 1945), American novelist
- Ann Harnett (1920–2006), American baseball player
- Ann E. Harrison, French-born American economist
- Ann Harrison (1974–1989), American murder victim
- Ann Hartley, New Zealand politician
- Ann Hartness (born 1936), American librarian
- Ann Harvey, Canadian fisher and rescuer
- Ann Die Hasselmo, American college president
- Ann Head (1915–1968), American novelist
- Ann Heard, English stage actress
- Ann Hearn (born 1953), American actress and director
- Ann Heberlein (born 1970), Swedish author, ethicist and theologian
- Ann Heinson, British American physicist
- Ann Henning Jocelyn, Swedish-born Irish playwright, translator and author
- Ann Margarit Henningsen (born 1949), Mexican canoeist
- Ann Henricksson (born 1959), American tennis player
- Ann Hercus (born 1942), New Zealand politician and diplomat
- Ann Herendeen, American author of popular fiction
- Ann-Sofie Hermansson (born 1964), Swedish politician
- Ann Hibner Koblitz, American academic
- Ann Hirsch, American artist
- Ann Hirschman, American nurse and street medic
- Ann Hjort (born 1956), Danish actress
- Ann Elizabeth Fowler Hodges (1920–1972), American woman struck by a falling meteorite in 1954
- Ann Hodgman, American author
- Ann Hogarth (1910–1993), English puppet-master
- Ann Hoggarth, Canadian politician
- Ann Holloway, American medical researcher
- Ann-Margret Holmgren (1850–1940), Swedish author, feminist, suffragist and pacifist
- Ann Hood (born 1956), American novelist
- Ann Hopkins (1943–2018), American business manager
- Ann Hornaday, American film critic
- Ann Hornschemeier, American astronomer
- Ann Horton (1894–1967), British physicist and academic
- Ann Hovey (1911–2007), American actress
- Ann Howe, Australian newspaper proprietor
- Ann Weber Hoyt (1922–2008), American archer
- Ann Hraychuck (1951–2021), American politician
- Ann Hui (born 1947), Hong Kong film director
- Ann Hulan, colonist, entrepreneur and experimental farmer
- Ann Hulbert (born 1965), American tennis player
- Ann Hull (1925–2003), American politician
- Ann Mercy Hunt (1938–2014), medical researcher and campaigner
- Ann-Mari Hvaal (born 1944), Norwegian artistic gymnast
- Ann Ireland (1953–2018), Canadian novelist
- Ann Irvin, English amateur golfer
- Ann Elizabeth Isham (1862–1912), passenger aboard the Titanic
- Ann Jäderlund (born 1955), Swedish poet and playwright
- Ann Jago (born 1939), English cricketer
- Ann Jannetta, American historian
- Ann Veronica Janssens, British artist
- Ann-Sofie Järnström (born 1949), Swedish speed skater
- Ann Jarvis (1832–1905), American activist
- Ann Jebb (1735–1812), English reformer and writer
- Ann Jellicoe (1927–2017), British actress, theatre director and playwright
- Ann Jessop (c. 1780–1864), UK cabinet-maker
- Ann Jillian (born 1950), American actress
- Ann J. Johanson (1934–2020), American pediatric endocrinologist
- Ann-Kristine Johansson, Swedish politician
- Ann-Sofie Johansson, Swedish fashion designer
- Ann Jonas (1932–2013), American author
- Ann Eleonora Jørgensen (born 1965), Danish actress
- Ann Jørgensen (born 1973), Danish badminton player
- Ann Hasseltine Judson (1789–1826), American foreign missionary
- Ann Jungman, British author of children's books
- Ann-Veruschka Jurisch (born 1972), German politician
- Ann Kalmbach, American artist
- Ann Kao (born 1984), Taiwanese business executive and politician
- Ann Karagozian, American aerospace engineer
- Ann Charlotte Karlsson, Swedish ski orienteering competitor
- Ann-Ewa Karlsson (born 1955), Swedish high jumper
- Ann Keefe, activist nun
- Ann Keen (born 1948), British Labour politician
- Ann Kelleher, engineer
- Ann E. Kelley (1954–2007), American neuroscientist
- Ann Kelley (writer) (born 1941), British writer
- Ann Kelley (politician), American politician and educator
- Ann Kendall (1939–2019), British archaeologist
- Ann Kenrick (born 1958), British charity worker
- Ann Maree Kerr (born 1967), Australian rhythmic gymnast
- Ann Kettle, British historian
- Ann Kiemel Anderson (1945–2014), American religious speaker
- Ann Kiessling (born 1942), American reproductive biologist
- Ann Kihengu, Tanzanian entrepreneur and distributor
- Ann Hitch Kilgore (1923–2001), American politician
- Ann Killion, American sports journalist and author
- Ann Killough (born 1947), American poet
- Ann Kim, American chef
- Ann Kimble-Hill, American biochemist and academic
- Ann Kindersley, English Girl Guide leader
- Ann Kipling (1934–2023), Canadian artist
- Ann Kirby (1770–1850), Canadian businesswoman
- Ann Kirk, American film actress
- Ann Kirkpatrick (born 1950), American politician
- Ann Kitchen (born 1954), American politician
- Ann Kiyomura (born 1955), American tennis player
- Ann-Catrin Kjerr (born 1949), Swedish curler
- Ann Klapperich (born 1976), American basketball player
- Ann Wenche Kleven (born 1968), Norwegian football referee
- Ann Knox, Canadian actress
- Ann Kobayashi (born 1937), American politician
- Ann Kocsis, American still-life painter
- Ann Koger, American tennis coach
- Ann Kok (born 1973), Singaporean actress
- Ann Kolanowski, American nurse
- Ann Olga Koloski-Ostrow, American archaeologist
- Ann-Mari Kornerup (1918–2006), Swedish-Danish textile artist
- Ann McLaughlin Korologos (1941–2023), American politician and businesswoman
- Ann-Kathrin Kramer (born 1966), German actress and writer
- Ann Kreiter, American television host
- Ann Kring, American psychologist
- Ann-Sofie Kylin (born 1955), Swedish actress
- Ann-Helén Laestadius, Swedish Sami novelist
- Ann Hannaford Lamar, American judge
- Ann Lambert (born 1957), Canadian author and playwright
- Ann Lambton (1912–2008), British historian
- Ann Lamont (born 1956), American venture capitalist
- Ann Lancaster (1920–1970), English actress
- Ann Margaret Lanchester, British fashion designer
- Ann Landers (1918–2002), pen name of American advice columnist Ruth Crowley and later, Esther Pauline Lederer
- Ann Langley, Canadian economist
- Ann Larabee, American literary historian
- Ann-Cecilie Larsen (born 1980), Norwegian physicist
- Ann Latham (1772–1835), British entomologist, scientific illustrator and watercolourist
- Ann Lauterbach (born 1942), American writer
- Ann Leahy (born 1971), Australian politician
- Ann Leckie (born 1966), American science fiction author
- Ann Lemoine, British chapbook publisher
- Ann Leonard (born 1969), Irish politician
- Ann Itto Leonardo, South Sudanese politician
- Ann Leslie (1941–2023), English journalist
- Ann Lewis (born 1937), American political advisor
- Ann Li (businesswoman) (born 1995), Filipino-Taiwanese businesswoman and fashion influencer
- Ann Li (tennis) (born 2000), American tennis player
- Ann-Sofie Lifvenhage (born 1976), Swedish politician
- Ann-Charlotte Lilja (born 1946), Swedish swimmer
- Ann Limb (born 1953), British educationalist, business leader and philanthropist
- Ann Linde (born 1961), Swedish politician, government minister from 2016 to 2022
- Ann Linder (born 1966), Swedish swimmer
- Ann-Kathrin Lindner (born 1987), German professional golfer
- Ann Lininger, American politician
- Ann-Kathrin Linsenhoff (born 1960), German equestrian
- Ann Lippert (born 1963), American comedian and actress
- Ann Lislegaard (born 1962), Norwegian artist
- Ann Little (1891–1984), American actress
- Ann Livermore (born 1958), former Executive Vice President at Hewlett-Packard
- Ann Loades, British theologian
- Ann Long (born 1936), English diver
- Ann Lovell (c. 1804–1869), homemaker, gold courier and shopkeeper
- Ann Lovett (1968–1984), Irish schoolgirl
- Ann Lowe (1898–1981), American fashion designer
- Ann Cathrin Lübbe (born 1971), Norwegian Paralympic equestrian
- Ann Lund, Australian journalist
- Ann Lurie (1944/1945–2024), American philanthropist and nurse
- Ann Lynn (1933–2020), British actress
- Ann Macbeth (1875–1948), British artist and suffragette
- Ann MacLean, Canadian politician and mental health therapist
- Ann Magnuson (born 1956), American actress, performance artist and singer
- Ann Mah (born 1951), American politician
- Ann Mahoney (born 1976), American politician
- Ann Majchrzak, American management academic
- Ann Major (born 1946), American novelist
- Ann Makosinski (born 1997), Canadian inventor and entrepreneur
- Ann Mallalieu, Baroness Mallalieu (born 1945), British lawyer and Labour Party politician
- Ann Mallinson, New Zealand children's book publisher
- Ann Mandelbaum (born 1945), American artist and photographer
- Ann Mandrella (born 1971), French actress
- Ann Manley, American brothel proprietor
- Ann Marcus (1921–2014), American screenwriter
- Ann-Margret (born 1941), Swedish-American actress, singer and dancer
- Ann Marks (1941–2016), British physicist and science communicator
- Ann Marshall (born 1957), American swimmer
- Ann Marston (1938–1971), American archer
- Ann Marvet (born 1939), Estonian botanist
- Ann Masterman Skinn (c. 1747–1789), English novelist
- Ann Mather (born 1960), English business executive
- Ann Teresa Mathews (1732–1800), founded the first Roman Catholic religious order for women in the US
- Ann Matibag, Filipina politician
- Ann Matlack, American politician
- Ann Maxwell (born 1944), American novelist
- Ann May (1898–1985), American actress
- Ann McCoy, American artist
- Ann Wyeth McCoy (1915–2005), American composer, pianist and painter
- Ann McCrary (born 1950), American singer
- Ann McCrea (born 1931), First Lady of North Carolina
- Ann McCrory (born 1956), First Lady of North Carolina
- Ann McDermott, American chemist
- Ann Patrice McDonough (born 1985), American figure skater
- Ann McEwen, West Indian cricketer
- Ann McGovern (1930–2015), American writer
- Ann McGrath, Australian historian
- Ann McGuiness (1957–2022), American reproductive rights advocate
- Ann McKechin (born 1961), British politician
- Ann McKee, American neuropathologist
- Ann McKellar, Scottish curler
- Ann McKenna (born 1943), New Zealand cricketer
- Ann McKnight, American film editor
- Ann McMahon, Australian rules footballer
- Ann McMullan (1923–2006), Director of the Electrical Association for Women
- Ann McNamee (born 1953), American singer-songwriter
- Ann McNeill, British academic/tobacco policy expert
- Ann McPherson (1945–2011), British doctor
- Ann McQuaid (born 1951), Irish canoeist
- Ann Medina, Canadian journalist and producer
- Ann Melander (born 1961), Swedish alpine skier
- Ann Mercken (born 1974), Belgian hurdler
- Ann Messner, American artist
- Ann Metzinger (1931–2022), American nutritionist
- Ann Meyer, American politician
- Ann Meyers (born 1955), American basketball player and sportscaster
- Ann Michelle (born 1952), British actress
- Ann Mikolowski (1940–1999), American contemporary artist
- Ann Millikan (born 1963), American composer
- Ann Millner, American politician and university administrator
- Ann Mills, British woman disguised as a sailor
- Ann Watt Milne (1856 – no earlier than 1928), Scottish social reformer, temperance leader
- Ann Mincieli, musical artist
- Ann Minnick, American nursing scholar
- Ann Stone Minot (1894–1980), American biologist and physiologist
- Ann Misiewicz, Australian basketball player
- Ann Mitchai (born 1985), Thai musical artist
- Ann-Helen Moen (born 1969), Norwegian musical artist
- Ann Mollo, British set decorator
- Ann M. Mongoven, American philosopher
- Ann D. Montgomery (born 1949), American judge
- Ann Mooney (born 1975), Papua New Guinean athlete
- Ann Moray, Welsh singer of Scots-Irish background
- Ann Morfee, British musician
- Ann Morhauser, American glass artist
- Ann Iren Mørkved (born 1981), Norwegian footballer
- Ann Morning (born 1968), American sociologist
- Ann Morrish (born 1928), British actress
- Ann Morrison (born 1956), American actress
- Ann Morriss (1919–1994), American actress
- Ann Mortifee (born 1947), Canadian musician
- Ann Mortimer, Canadian ceramic artist and member of the Order of Canada
- Ann B. Moser, American biochemist
- Ann Moss, British professor of French and French literature
- Ann Moss (musician) (born 1976), American operatic soprano
- Ann Mounsey (1811–1891), British teacher, conductor and organist
- Ann Moyal (1926–2019), Australian historian
- Ann Mui (1959–2000), Hong Kong actress and singer
- Ann Mukoro (born 1975), Nigerian footballer
- Ann A. Mullen (1935–1994), American politician
- Ann-Katrin Müller, German journalist
- Ann Mulqueen, Sean-nós singer and performer
- Ann Mulvale, Canadian politician
- Ann Murdock (1890–1939), American actress
- Ann Murray (born 1949), Irish mezzo-soprano
- Ann Murry, English children's educational writer and poet
- Ann Karindi Mwangi (born 1988), Kenyan runner
- Ann Napolitano, American writer
- Ann Nardulli (1948–2018), American endocrinologist
- Ann Nderitu, Registrar of Political Parties in Kenya
- Ann Nesby (born 1955), American singer and actress
- Ann Newdigate (1931–2023), South African-born Canadian artist
- Ann Newmarch (1945–2022), Australian artist
- Ann Mary Newton (1832–1866), English painter
- Ann Nicholson, Australian Computer Scientist
- Ann-Margret Nirling (1918–1999), Swedish diver
- Ann Nischke (born 1951), American politician
- Ann Njogu, Kenyan activist
- Ann C. Noble, sensory chemist
- Ann Nocenti (born 1957), American journalist, comic book writer and editor
- Ann Noë (born 1959), Belgian footballer and coach
- Ann Noël, British artist
- Ann Nooney, American printmaker
- Ann Grete Nørgaard (born 1983), Danish handball player
- Ann Northrop, American journalist and activist
- Ann Nowé, Belgian computer scientist
- Ann Rose Nu Tawng, Burmese nun
- Ann Helen Nu'uali'itia (born 1990), Samoan netball player
- Ann-Christin Nykvist (born 1948), Swedish politician
- Ann Oakley (born 1944), British sociologist, feminist and writer
- Ann Ogbomo, English actress
- Ann Shumelda Okerson, American librarian
- Ann Olivarius (born 1955), British lawyer
- Ann Ollestad (born 1952), Norwegian diplomat
- Ann-Kristin Olsen (born 1945), Norwegian jurist and civil servant
- Ann Shola Orloff, American sociologist
- Ann Ormonde (born 1935), Irish politician
- Ann Orrison (born 1961), American soccer player
- Ann Osgerby (born 1963), English swimmer
- Ann Osman (born 1986), Malaysian martial artist
- Ann Packer (born 1942), English sprinter
- Ann Packer (author) (born 1959), American novelist and short story writer
- Ann Randolph Meade Page (c. 1781–1838), episcopal slavery reformer
- Ann C. Palmenberg, American biochemist
- Ann Paludan (c. 1928–2014), British writer
- Ann Pancake, American novelist
- Ann Partridge, American medical oncologist
- Ann Patchett (born 1963), American novelist and memoirist
- Ann Peacock, South African screenwriter
- Ann Peebles (born 1947), American singer and songwriter
- Ann Peel (born 1961), Canadian race walker
- Ann Pellegreno, American aviator
- Ann Pellegrini, gender, sexuality and performance studies scholar
- Ann Peoples (1947–2019), American politician
- Ann Peoples (Antarctic manager), US anthropologist and business manager
- Ann Peters, Grenadian politician
- Ann Petersen (1927–2003), Belgian actress
- Ann Peterson (born 1947), American diver
- Ann Petrén (born 1954), Swedish actress
- Ann Petry (1908–1997), American author and journalist
- Ann-Sofi Pettersson (born 1932), Swedish gymnast
- Ann Pettifor, British economist
- Ann Pfau, American judge
- Ann Phelan (born 1961), Irish Labour Party politician
- Ann Philbin, American museum director
- Ann Phong (born 1957), Vietnamese American painter
- Ann Pibal, American painter
- Ann Pilling (born 1944), English author and poet
- Ann Hobson Pilot (born 1943), American harpist
- Ann Pirvu (born 1987), Romanian-Canadian actress
- Ann Pitt (1718–1799), British actress
- Ann Hunter Popkin (born 1945), American women's rights activist
- Ann Pornel, Canadian comedian and actress
- Ann Power (born 1962), Irish judge
- Ann Powers (born 1964), American writer and music critic
- Ann Pratt (born c. 1830), Jamaican author about Kingston Lunatic Asylum
- Ann Prentice, British nutritionist
- Ann Prentiss (1939–2010), American actress
- Ann Preston (1813–1872), American physician and educator
- Ann Probert (born 1938), American golfer
- Ann Pugh, American politician
- Ann Purcell (born 1941), American painter
- Ann Purmell (born 1953), American children's book author
- Ann Purzner, American politician
- Ann Putnam Jr. (1679–1716), witness at the Salem Witch Trials
- Ann-Maree Putney, Australian ten-pin bowler
- Ann Quin (1936–1973), British novelist
- Ann-Sophie Qvarnstrom (born 1958), Swedish illustrator and silversmith
- Ann Rabbitt (born 1960), American politician
- Ann Rabson (1945–2013), American singer
- Ann Rachlin (1933–2023), British musician and author
- Ann Radcliffe (1764–1823), English author and pioneer of the Gothic subgenre
- Ann Cuthbert Rae (1788–1860), Canadian writer and educator
- Ann Rankin, New Zealand netball player
- Ann Ravel (born 1949), American attorney
- Ann Redgrave (born 1960), British rower and physician
- Ann Reed (born 1954), American singer-songwriter
- Ann Reid, Nonprofit Executive Director
- Ann Reinking (1949–2020), American actor, dancer, and choreographer
- Ann Rest (born 1942), American politician
- Ann Rice O'Hanlon (1908–c. 1998), American painter
- Ann Rigney, Irish/Dutch cultural scholar
- Ann Rinaldi (1934–2021), American author
- Ann Rincon, American electronic design automation engineer
- Ann Riordan (1947–2021), first general manager of Microsoft Ireland
- Ann Risley (born 1949), American actress and comedian
- Ann Ritonia, American bishop
- Ann Rivers, American politician and educator from Washington
- Ann Rohmer (born 1958), Canadian television personality
- Ann Romney (born 1949), wife of American businessman and politician, Mitt Romney
- Ann E. Rondeau, American Navy admiral
- Ann Ronell (1905–1993), American composer and lyricist
- Ann Roniger (1943–2019), American high jumper and pentathlete
- Ann-Sofi Roos (born 1959), Swedish swimmer
- Ann Rork Light (1908–1988), American actress
- Ann Rosendahl (born 1959), Swedish cross-country skier
- Ann Rosener (1914–2012), American photographer
- Ann Rosman (born 1973), Swedish writer
- Ann Roth (born 1931), American costume designer
- Ann Rowan (1929–2014), Irish actress
- Ann Rowles, American sculptor
- Ann Royer, American painter
- Ann Rule (1931–2015), American author
- Ann Rumsby (1803–1850), Australian convict
- Ann Rutherford (1917–2012), Canadian-born American actress
- Ann Rutledge (19th century), young woman who was allegedly Abraham Lincoln's first love
- Ann Pottinger Saab (1934–2019), American historian
- Ann Saddlemyer (born 1932), Canadian academic
- Ann Sakai, botanist
- Ann Salens (1940–1994), Belgian fashion designer
- Ann Linnea Sandberg (1938–2009), American immunologist
- Ann-Sofie Sandberg, Swedish food chemist
- Ann Sanders (born 1960), Australian television news presenter
- Ann Sansom, British poet and writing tutor
- Ann Sarnoff (born c. 1962), American businesswoman
- Ann Saunderson (born 1967), British dance music singer
- Ann Savours Shirley (1927–2022), British historian of polar exploration
- Ann Savoy (born 1952), American musician, author and record producer
- Ann Sayer (1936–2020), English long-distance walker and rower
- Ann C. Scales (1952–2012), American lawyer
- Ann Schatz, American journalist
- Ann Schein Carlyss (born 1939), American pianist
- Ann Schlee (1934–2023), English novelist
- Ann-Helena Schlüter, German pianist
- Ann Schonberger (1940–2022), American professor
- Ann K. Schwader, American poet
- Ann Childe Seguin (1811–1888), British and American opera singer and music teacher
- Ann Seidman (1926–2019), American economist
- Ann Selin (born 1960), Finnish trade unionist
- Ann Selzer, American political pollster
- Ann Sexton (born 1950), American soul singer
- Ann Sheetal (born 1994), Indian model and film actress
- Ann Sheridan (1915–1967), American actress and singer
- Ann Sherry (born 1954), Australian public servant and businesswoman
- Ann Shin, Canadian filmmaker
- Ann Shipley (1899–1981), Canadian politician
- Ann Allen Shockley (born 1927), American journalist and author
- Ann Shoebridge (born 1973), Australian milliner
- Ann Shoemaker (1891–1978), American actress
- Ann Shoket (born 1972), American magazine writer and editor
- Ann Shulgin (1931–2022), American actress
- Ann Shurrock (born 1946), New Zealand archer
- Ann-Sofi Sidén (born 1962), Swedish artist
- Ann Sidney (born 1944), British actress and beauty queen
- Ann Loomis Silsbee, American composer and poet
- Ann Silver (1929–2023), British physiologist
- Ann Simmons (born 1953), American swimmer
- Ann Simons (born 1980), Belgian Olympic judoka
- Ann Sindall, Boris Johnson's personal assistant
- Ann Sissons (born 1958), New Zealand diver
- Ann Skelly (born 1996), Irish actress
- Ann Skelton, South African jurist
- Ann Sloat (1928–2017), Canadian politician
- Ann Smyrner (1934–2016), Danish actress
- Ann Snodgrass, American poet and translator
- Ann Sophie (born 1990), German singer
- Ann Sothern (1909–2001), American actress
- Ann Southam (1937–2010), Canadian music composer and music teacher
- Ann Spejlsgaard (born 1978), Danish sport shooter
- Ann M. Sperber (1935–1994), American author
- Ann Spohnholz (1950–2024), American politician
- Ann B. Stahl (born 1954), Africanist archaeologist
- Ann Stanford (1916–1987), American poet and academic
- Ann Stengård (born 1955), Danish footballer
- Ann Stepan (1943–2015), American politician
- Ann Stephenson Cameron, American tennis player
- Ann Stock, American government employee
- Ann Bradford Stokes, American nurse
- Ann Laura Stoler, American anthropologist
- Ann-Christin Strack (born 1993), German bobsledder
- Ann S. Strand, Wyoming politician
- Ann Streissguth (1932–2023), American scientist
- Ann Strother (born 1983), American basketball player
- Ann Sudmalis (born 1955), Australian politician
- Ann Sumner, British art historian and exhibition curator
- Ann Sutton (born 1935), British artist
- Ann Sutton (equestrian) (born 1958), American equestrian
- Ann Suzuki, Canadian artist
- Ann Swaine (1821–1883), British writer and a suffragist
- Ann Swidler (born 1944), American sociologist
- Ann Swisshelm (born 1968), American curler
- Ann Symonds (1939–2018), Australian politician
- Ann K. Symons, American librarian
- Ann Syrdal (1945–2020), American psychologist and researcher
- Ann Tahincioğlu (born 1956), Turkey's first female car racing driver
- Ann Tanksley (1934–1997), American artist
- Ann Telnaes, American editorial cartoonist
- Ann Temkin (born 1959), American art curator
- Ann-Mari Tengbom (1907–1999), German princess
- Ann Tenno (born 1952), Estonian photographer and photo artist
- Ann Ter-Pogossian (1932–2022), American artist
- Ann Thomson, Australian painter and sculptor
- Ann Thongprasom (born 1976), Thai film and television actress, host and producer
- Ann Thwaite (born 1932), British biographer
- Ann Tilton, pediatric neurologist, scientist and department chair
- Ann Timmer (born 1960), American judge
- Ann Todd (American actress) (1931–2020), American actress and librarian
- Ann Todd (1907–1993), English actress
- Ann Toebbe (born 1974), American contemporary artist
- Ann Townsend, American poet and essayist
- Ann Agnes Trail (1798–1872), British Roman Catholic nun and artist
- Ann Trason (born 1960), American ultramarathon runner
- Ann Treneman, American journalist
- Ann Trenk, American mathematician
- Ann Trevor (1899–1970), British actress
- Ann Trindade, Australian historian
- Ann Trombley (born 1963), American cyclist
- Ann Trotter (1932–2022), New Zealand historian
- Ann Tsukamoto (born 1952), American stem cell researcher and inventor
- Ann Turkel (born 1946), American actress and former model
- Ann Turnbull (born 1943), British writer
- Ann Tutwiler (born 1958), former Director-General of Biodiversity International
- Ann Twinam, American historian
- Ann Tyrrell (1909–1983), American actress
- Ann Scott Tyson, American journalist
- Ann Belford Ulanov (born 1938), American psychoanalyst
- Anne Barbara Underhill (1920–2003), Canadian astrophysicist
- Ann M. Valentine, American bio-inorganic chemist
- Ann Valentine (1762–1842), English organist and composer
- Ann Van Elsen (born 1979), Belgian model
- Ann Van Gysel, Belgian scientist and businesswoman
- Ann Van Sevenant (born 1959), Belgian philosopher
- Ann VanderMeer (born 1957), American publisher
- Ann Vanheste (born 1969), Belgian politician
- Ann Vanstone, Australian lawyer
- Ann Veneman (born 1949), American attorney
- Ann Verdcourt (1934–2022), New Zealand sculptor and ceramicist
- Ann Vermilion, American politician and businesswoman
- Ann Villella, American voice actress
- Ann Voskamp (born 1973), Canadian writer
- Ann Vriend, Canadian musical artist
- Ann Wager, teacher and school mistress in Colonial Williamsburg
- Ann Wagner (born 1962), American politician
- Ann Waldron (1924–2010), American writer
- Ann Walsh, American painter
- Ann Walton Kroenke (born 1948), American businesswoman and heiress to the Walmart fortune
- Ann Warder, American diarist
- Ann Washington Craton (1891–1970), American activist
- Ann E. Watkins, American mathematician
- Ann Wauters (born 1980), Belgian basketball player
- Ann Way (1915–1993), English actress
- Ann Wedgeworth (1934–2017), American actress
- Ann Elizabeth Wee (1926–2019), Singaporean academic
- Ann E. Wehrle, American astronomer
- Ann Weil (1908–1969), American children's author
- Ann Welch (1917–2002), gliding, hang gliding, paragliding and microlight flying pilot
- Ann Westin (born 1956), Swedish comedian
- Ann Whitaker, American physicist
- Ann Widdecombe (1947–2026), British politician, author and television personality
- Ann Wigglesworth (1939–2022), British fair trade pioneer
- Ann Wigmore (1909–1994), American holistic health practitioner
- Ann-Cathrine Wiklander (born 1958), Swedish singer
- Ann Wild (born 1973), British wheelchair basketball player
- Ann Wilkens, Swedish journalist and diplomat
- Ann Wilkins (1806–1857), American missionary teacher
- Ann Willoughby, American graphic designer
- Ann Winblad (born 1950), American businesswoman
- Ann Winsborn (born 1981), Swedish singer-songwriter
- Ann Winterton (born 1941), British politician
- Ann Wintle, British geophysicist
- Ann Wisdom (1934–2015), English rally driver
- Ann Dryden Witte (born 1942), American economist
- Ann Wolpert (1943–2013), American librarian
- Ann Womer Benjamin, American politician
- Ann Woodward (1915–1975), American socialite and murder suspect
- Ann Woolcock (1937–2001), Australian scientist
- Ann Wroe (born 1951), English author and columnist
- Ann Wyley (died 1777), American enslaved woman
- Ann Wylie (1922–2024), New Zealand botanist
- Ann Wynia (born 1943), American politician
- Ann M. Yastishock, American diplomat
- Ann Yearsley (1753–1806), English poet and writer
- Ann Yoshida (born 1977), American paracanoeist
- Ann Zabludoff, American astronomer and astrophysicist
- Ann Zacharias (born 1956), Swedish actress
- Ann Zahn, American printmaker and book artist
- Ann Zauber, epidemiologist and biostatistician
- Ann Zhang (born 1957), Chinese speed skater
- Ann Strickler Zweig, scientist

== As a masculine name ==
- Anna of East Anglia (died 653/54), king of East Anglia
- Anne Argula (born 1938), American novelist
- Anne Amable Augier du Fot (1733–1775), French doctor
- Anne van den Ban (1928–2016), Dutch agricultural economist
- Anne Bignan (1795–1861), French poet and translator
- Anne van der Bijl (1928–2022), Dutch Christian missionary
- Anne du Bourg (1521–1559), French magistrate
- Anne Casimir Pyrame de Candolle (1836–1918), Swiss botanist
- Anne Claude de Caylus (1692–1765), French antiquarian and proto-archaeologist
- Anne Danican Philidor (1681–1728), French musician, composer, founder, Concert Spirituel Tuileries
- Anne-Louis Girodet de Roussy-Trioson (1767–1824), French Romantic painter
- Anne d'Escars de Givry (1546–1612), French Benedictine cardinal
- Anne Hamilton (1709–1748), Scottish nobleman
- Anne Chrétien Louis de Hell (1783–1864), French admiral
- Anne Charles Hérisson (1831–1893), French lawyer and politician
- Anne de Joyeuse (c.1560–1587), French admiral during the French Wars of Religion
- Anne Pierre de Kat (1881–1968), Belgian painter
- William Anne Keppel, 2nd Earl of Albemarle (1702–1754), British nobleman
- Anne van Kesteren (born 1986), Dutch open source competitor
- Anne Louis Henri de La Fare (1752–1829), French Roman Catholic cardinal and counter-revolutionary
- Anne-Charles Lorry (1726–1783), French physician
- Anne van der Meiden (1929–2021), Dutch translator, writer and theologian
- Anne de Montmorency (1493–1567), constable of France, soldier, statesman, and diplomat
- Anne Charles François de Montmorency (1768–1846), 5th Duke of Montmorency
- Anne Mulder (born 1969), Dutch politician
- Anne de Noailles (d. 1678), first Duke of Noailles
- Anne Poulett (1711–1785), British Member of Parliament
- Anne Jean Marie René Savary (1774–1833), French general and diplomat
- Anne Hilarion de Tourville (1642–1701), French naval commander, Marshal of France
- Anne-François-Charles Trelliard (1764–1832), Cavalry Commander during Napoleonic War
- Anne Sjerp Troelstra (1939–2019), Dutch mathematician and logician
- Anne Robert Jacques Turgot (1727–1781), French economist and statesman
- Anne Vermeer (1916–2018), Dutch politician
- Anne Vondeling (1916–1979), Dutch politician
- Anne de Vries (1904–1964), Dutch writer from Drenthe

== Disambiguation ==
=== Anne ===
- Anne Allen, several people
- Anne Andersen, several people
- Anne Anderson, several people
- Anne Austin, several people
- Anne Bailey, several people
- Anne Baker, several people
- Anne de Beauchamp, several people
- Anne Borg, several people
- Anne Brown, several people
- Anne Burke, several people
- Anne Butler, several people
- Anne Byrne, several people
- Anne Campbell, several people
- Anne Carter, several people
- Anne Chambers, several people
- Anne Chapman, several people
- Anne Clark, several people
- Anne Clarke, several people
- Anne Collins, several people
- Anne Conway, several people
- Anne Cook, several people
- Anne Crawford, several people
- Anne Cummins, several people
- Anne Dacre, several people
- Anne Davies, several people
- Anne Dawson, several people
- Anne Dixon, several people
- Anne Dormer, several people
- Anne Dudley, several people
- Anne Edwards, several people
- Anne Evans, several people
- Anne Ferguson, several people
- Anne George, several people
- Anne Gibson, several people
- Anne Gilbert, several people
- Anne Gilchrist, several people
- Anne Glover, several people
- Anne Green, several people
- Anne Grete, several people
- Anne Grey, several people
- Anne Hamilton, several people
- Anne Harris, several people
- Anne Hastings, several people
- Anne Heaton, several people
- Anne Henderson, several people
- Anne Herbert, several people
- Anne Hill, several people
- Anne Holmes, several people
- Anne Howard, several people
- Anne Hudson, several people
- Anne Ingram, several people
- Anne James, several people
- Anne Johnson, several people
- Anne Johnston, several people
- Anne Johnstone, several people
- Anne Keefe, several people
- Anne Kerr, several people
- Anne King, several people
- Anne Klein, several people
- Anne Knight, several people
- Anne Knowles, several people
- Anne de Laval, several people
- Anne Lee, several people
- Anne Lennox, several people
- Anne Leonard, several people
- Anne Levy, several people
- Anne Liddell, several people
- Anne Lockhart, several people
- Anne Lynch, several people
- Anne Lyons, several people
- Anne MacKenzie, several people
- Anne Madden, several people
- Anne Manning, several people
- Anne-Marie (given name), several people
- Anne Marsh, several people
- Anne Maxwell, several people
- Anne McBride, several people
- Anne McEwen, several people
- Anne Miller, several people
- Anne Montgomery, several people
- Anne Morgan, several people
- Anne Neville, several people
- Anne Newdigate, several people
- Anne O'Brien, several people
- Anne Osbourn, several people
- Anne Palmer, several people
- Anne Parker, several people
- Anne Parr, several people
- Anne Patterson, several people
- Anne Percy, several people
- Anne Petersen, several people
- Anne Phillips, several people
- Anne Plantagenet, several people
- Anne Rasmussen, several people
- Anne Robertson, several people
- Anne Ross, several people
- Anne Russell, several people
- Anne Sackville, several people
- Anne Saunders, several people
- Anne Savage, several people
- Anne Scott, several people
- Anne Seymour, several people
- Anne Shaw, several people
- Anne Shelton, several people
- Anne Smith, several people
- Anne Somerset, several people
- Anne Spencer, several people
- Lady Anne Stanley, several people
- Anne Stone, several people
- Anne Stuart, several people
- Anne Sutherland, several people
- Anne Thompson, several people
- Anne Turner, several people
- Anne Twomey, several people
- Anne Vaughan, several people
- Anne Villeneuve, several people
- Anne Walker, several people
- Anne Ward, several people
- Anne Warner, several people
- Anne Wentworth, several people
- Anne Wheaton, several people
- Anne Wilson, several people
- Anne Winters, several people
- Anne Woods, several people
- Anne Wright, several people
- Anne Young, several people

=== Ann ===
- Ann Alexander, several people
- Ann Barry, several people
- Ann Bartholomew, several people
- Ann Bishop, several people
- Ann Bowling, several people
- Ann Bradshaw, several people
- Ann Burns, several people
- Ann Burton, several people
- Ann Carr, several people
- Ann-Christine, several people
- Ann Christy, several people
- Ann Coleman, several people
- Ann Cooper, several people
- Ann Cotton, several people
- Ann Cunningham, several people
- Ann Curtis, several people
- Ann Davis, several people
- Ann Davison, several people
- Ann Dixon, several people
- Ann Douglas, several people
- Ann Goldstein, several people
- Ann Gordon, several people
- Ann Graham, several people
- Ann Hamilton, several people
- Ann Hanson, several people
- Ann Henderson, several people
- Ann Hughes, several people
- Ann Jansson, several people
- Ann Johnston, several people
- Ann Jones, several people
- Ann Kelly, several people
- Ann Kennedy, several people
- Ann Lewis, several people
- Ann Lloyd, several people
- Ann-Louise, several people
- Ann-Maria, several people
- Ann Martin, several people
- Ann Mitchell, several people
- Ann Moore, several people
- Ann Morgan, several people
- Ann Nelson, several people
- Ann Norton, several people
- Ann Parker, several people
- Ann Pennington, several people
- Ann Richards, several people
- Ann Roberts, several people
- Ann Robinson, several people
- Ann Scott, several people
- Ann Shaw, several people
- Ann Simpson, several people
- Ann Stephens, several people
- Ann Sullivan, several people
- Ann Taylor, several people
- Ann Thomas, several people
- Ann Turner, several people
- Ann Ward, several people
- Ann Williams, several people
- Ann Wilson, several people
- Ann Wolf, several people
- Ann Wood, several people

== Fictional characters ==
- Ann, in the Story of Seasons video game franchise
- Ann, a hunter in the video game Identity V
- Anne Boonchuy, from the American animated TV series Amphibia
- Anne Brookes, on the American TV sitcom The Ropers
- Ann Darrow, in the films King Kong (1933) and King Kong (2005)
- Anne Elliot, in Jane Austen's Persuasion
- Anne Garland, in Thomas Hardy's The Trumpet-Major
- Anne Glass, in the American TV series Falling Skies
- Ann Gora, character in the 1990s animated series SWAT Kats: The Radical Squadron
- Anne Kirrin, the youngest of the four cousins in Enid Blyton's The Famous Five novels
- Anne Lester, a survivor in the video game Identity V
- Anne Lewis, in the Robocop franchise
- Anne Maria, from the Canadian animated TV series Total Drama: Revenge of the Island
- Anne Page, from William Shakespeare's The Merry Wives of Windsor
- Ann Perkins, from the American television series Parks and Recreation
- Ann Possible, character in the animated series Kim Possible
- Anne Shirley, in Lucy Maud Montgomery's Anne of Green Gables
- Ann Takamaki, one of the main characters from video game Persona 5
- Anne Weying, ex-wife of Eddie Brock who is known as She-Venom
- Anne Wheeler, from the musical drama film The Greatest Showman
- Anne "Annie" Wilkes, a main character in Misery and its film adaptation, played by Kathy Bates
- Raggedy Ann, rag doll in Johnny Gruelle's books, 1918 onwards
- Rebecca Anne "Annie" January, one of the main characters in The Boys franchise
- Ann, sister of the titular character in Chi's Sweet Home

== See also ==
- Ann Arbor, Michigan
- Anne's theorem, result from Euclidean geometry, due to Pierre-Leon Anne (1806–1850)
- Lady Anne (disambiguation)
- Princess Anne (disambiguation)
- Queen Anne (disambiguation)
- St Ann (disambiguation)
- Saint Anne (disambiguation)
