= List of people of Gotland =

Gotland coat of arms

The following is a list of notable related in a significant way with the Swedish island of Gotland.

== Gallery ==
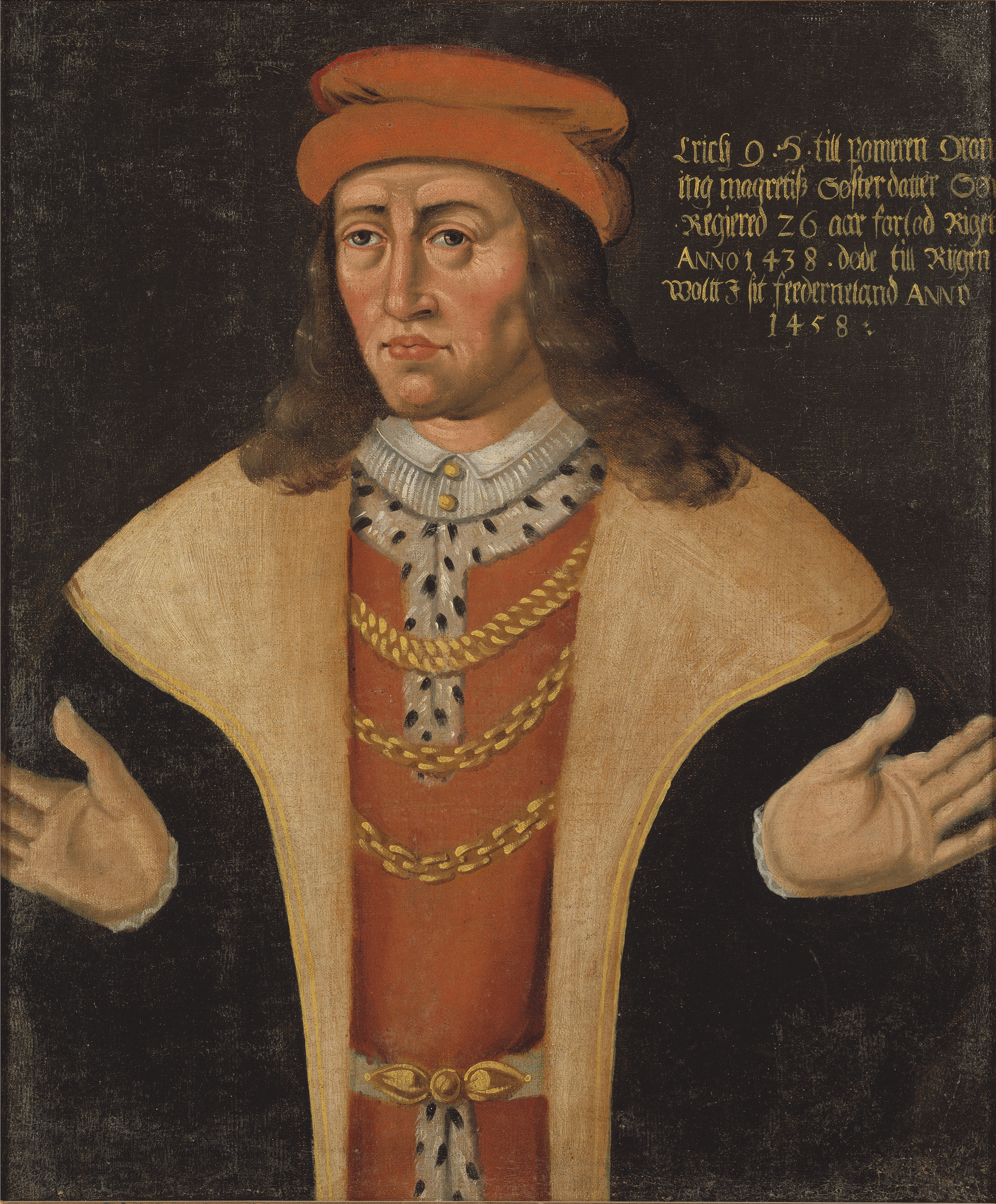
Erik I av Pommern 1382-1459

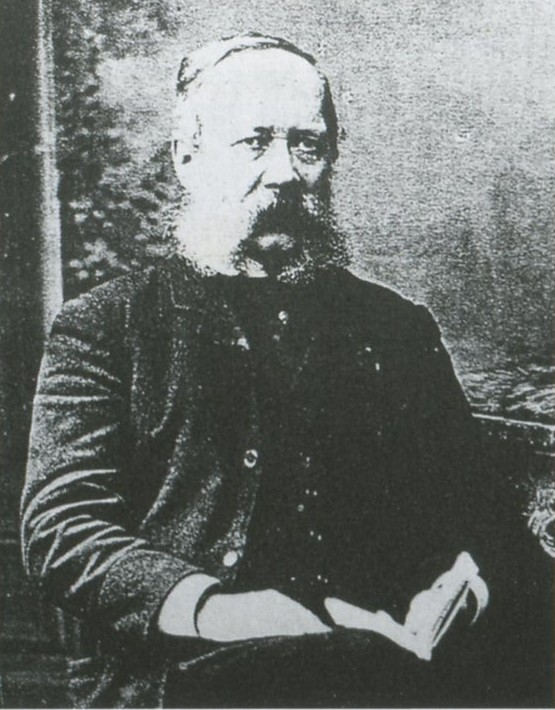
Victor Kullberg 1824-1890

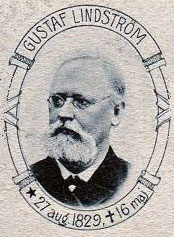
Gustaf Lindström, 1901

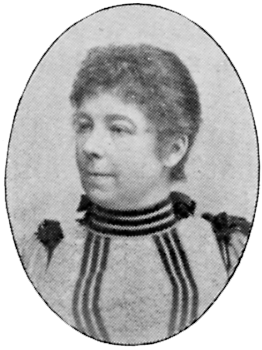
Anna Maria Gardell-Ericson, 1901

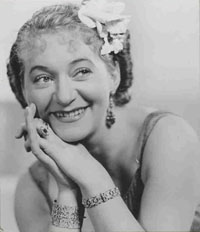
Hjördis Petterson, 1930's

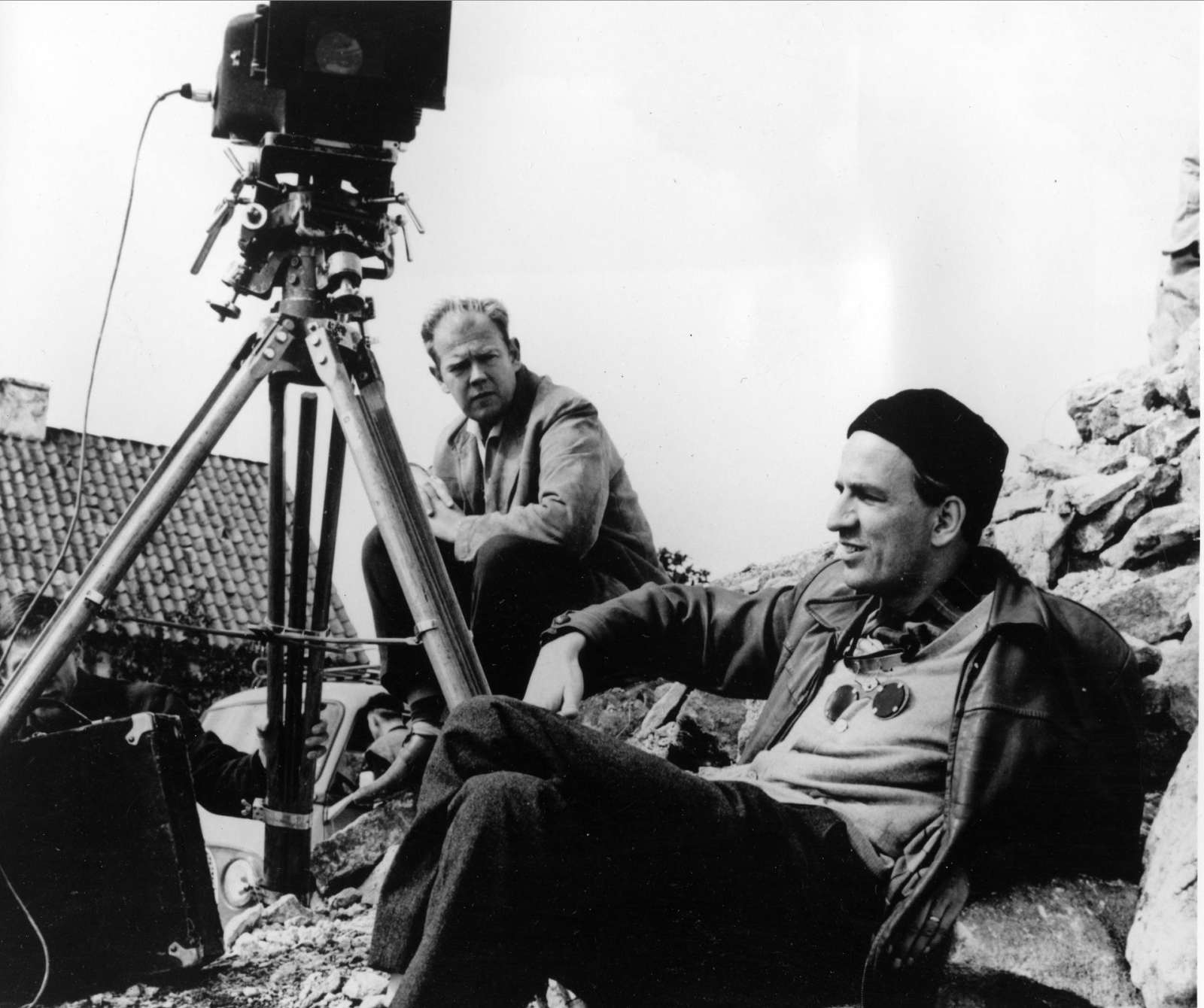
Ingmar Bergman and Sven Nykvist in 1961

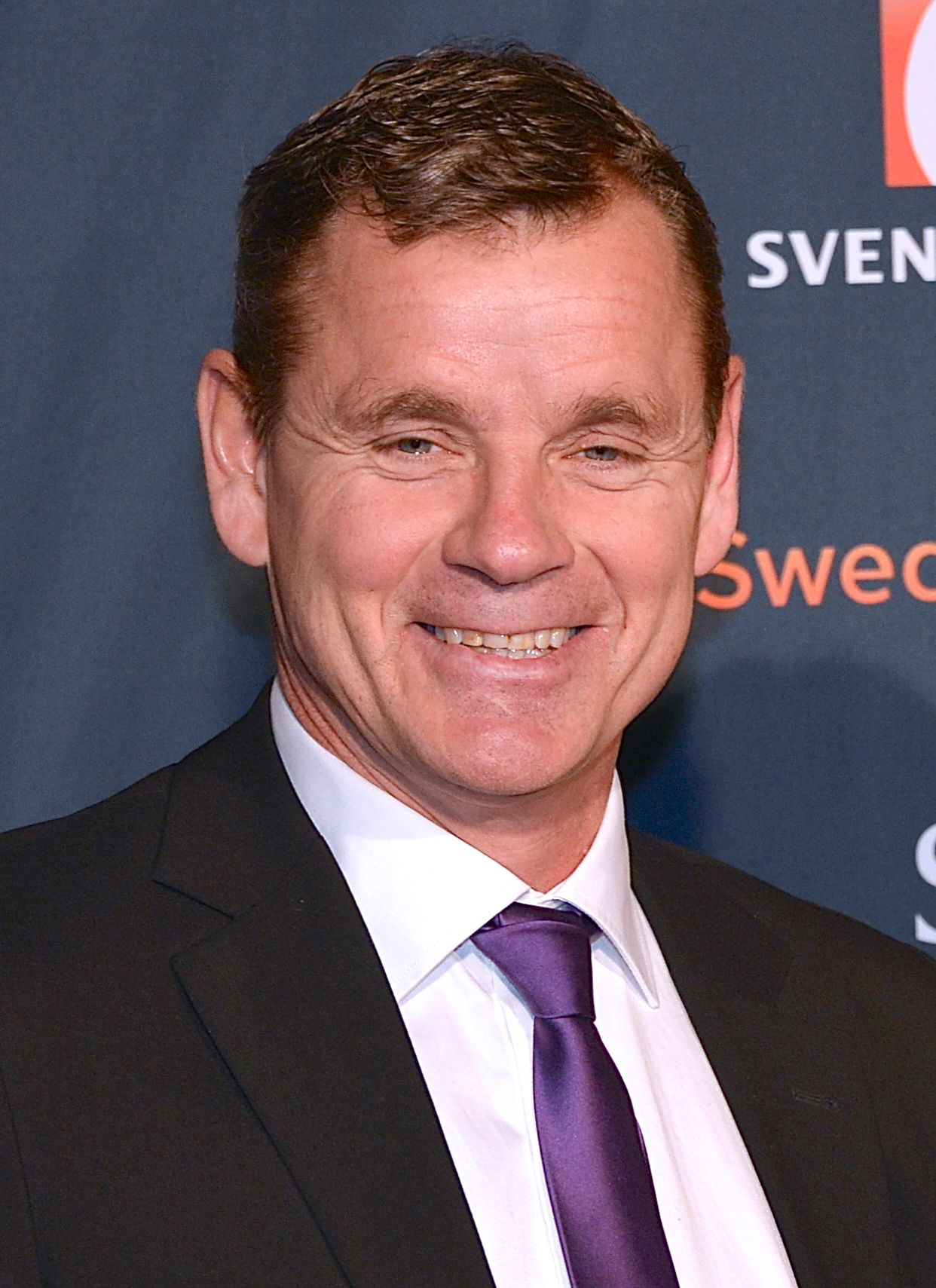
Håkan Loob, 2013

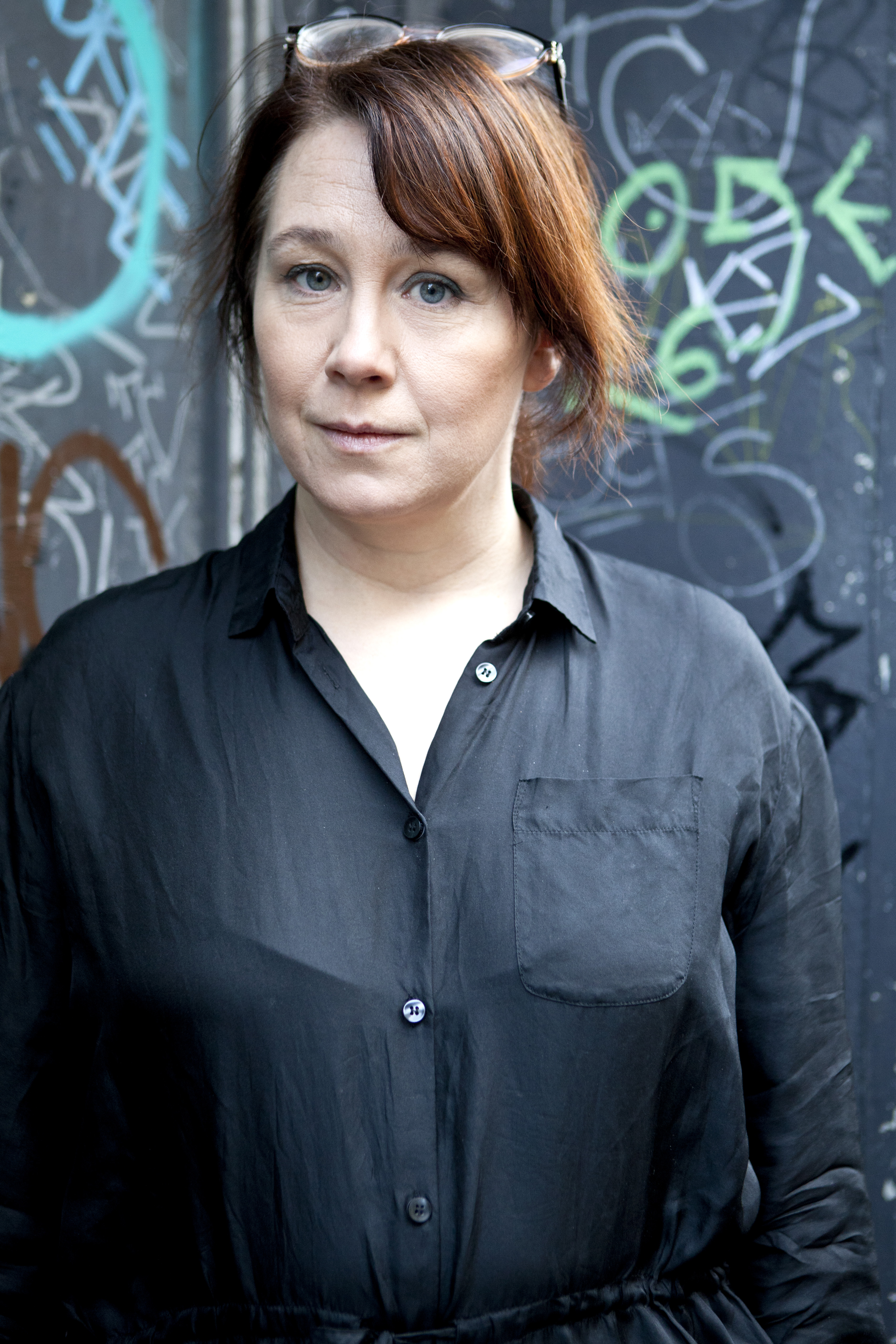
Frida Röhl, 2014

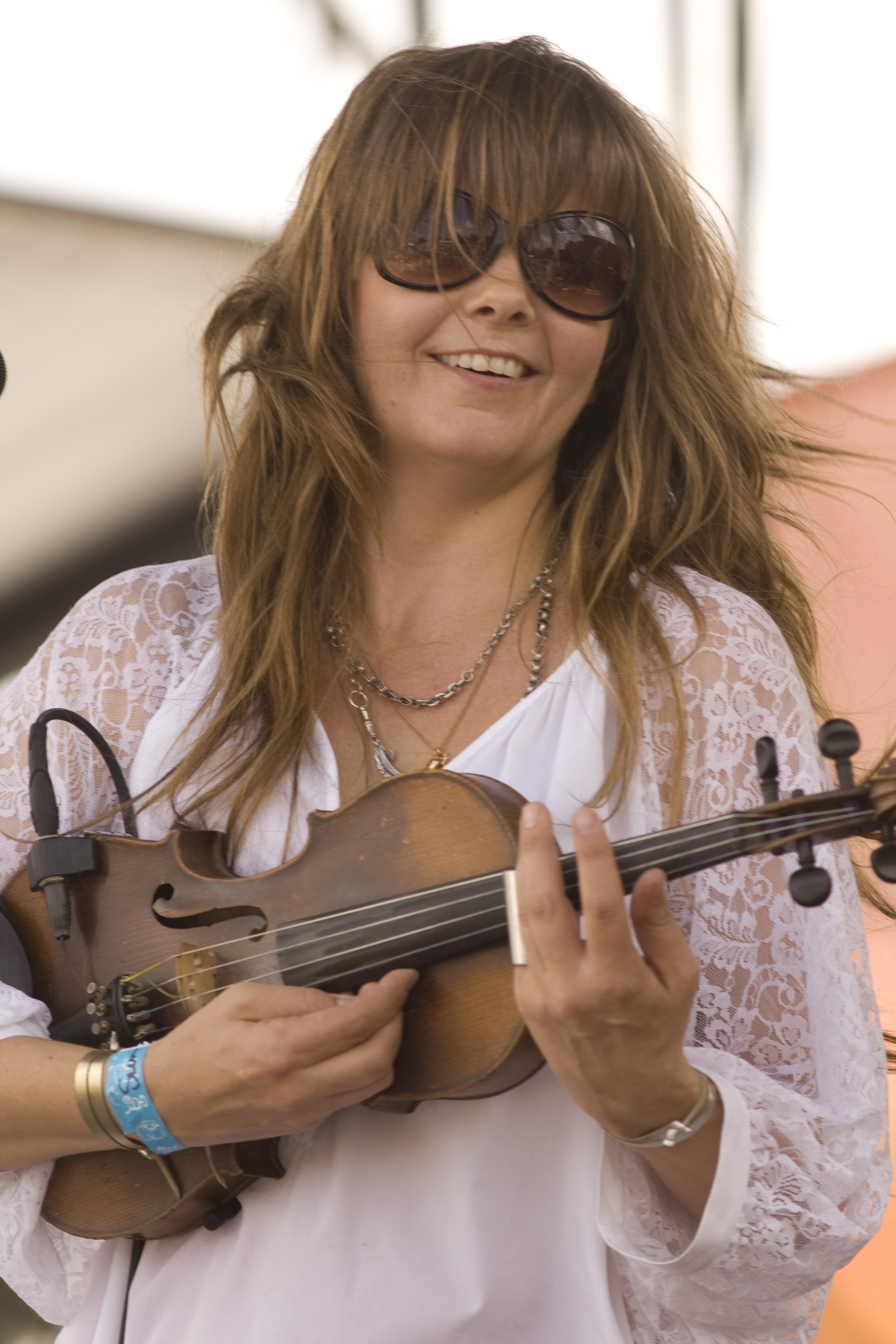
Theresa Andersson, 2012

== List ==
Name	About	Born	Died	Location	Known for	Ref
Petrus de Dacia	(1235 - 1289 in Visby) A Swedish Dominican friar, may have been born on Gotland and lived on the island around 1261 to 1289.	1235	1289	Visby	Friar	
Eric I, Duke of Mecklenburg	(ca.1365 - 1397 in Klintehamn); Heir to the throne of Sweden	1365	1397	Klintehamn	Heir throne of Sweden	
Eric of Pomerania	(1381/2–1459); Ruler of the Kalmar Union 1396/1439, Eric lived in Visby for ten years and in 1411 he had the castle of Visborg constructed	1381/2	1459	Visby	Ruler Kalmar Union	
Jacob Madsen	(1596 in Visby – 1653); A Danish merchant, shipowner and builder	1596	1653	Visby	Merchant	
Christopher Polhem	(1661 in Tingstäde – 1751); Scientist, inventor and industrialist, particularly mining	1598	1653	Visby	Scientist	
Greta Donner	(1726 in Visby – 1774); Spell and export business person	1726	1774	Visby	Business	
Jacob Niclas Ahlström	(1805 in Visby – 1857); Kapellmeister and composer	1805	1857	Visby	Composer	
Pehr Arvid Säve	(1811 in Roma – 1887); Historian, linguist and artist, initiated Gotland Museum	1811	1887	Roma	Historian	
Ernst von Vegesack	(1820 in Hemse – 1903); Army officer, worked in Swedish colony of Saint Barthélemy and the US Union Army	1820	1903	Hemse	Officer	
Oscar Malmborg	(1820 in Kräklingbo – 1880); Veteran of the Mexican War, emigrated 1846	1820	1880	Kräklingbo	War veteran	
Victor Kullberg	(1824 in Visby - 1890 in London); Watch and marine chronometer maker in London for navies throughout the world	1824	1890	Visby	Clockmaker	
Gustaf Lindström	(1829 in Visby – 1901); Paleontologist	1829	1901	Visby	Paleontologist	
Axel Haig	(1835 in Katthamra – 1921); Artist and architect	1835	1921	Katthamra	Artist	
Elfrida Andrée	(1841 in Visby – 1929); Organist, composer and conductor	1841	1929	Visby	Musician	
Wilhelmina Skogh	(1849 in Rute – 1926; Hotel manager and owner	1849	1926	Rute	Hotel owner	
Anna Gardell-Ericson	(1853 in Visby – 1939); Painter and watercolorist of coastal scenes	1853	1939	Visby	Painter	
Gabriel Gustafson	(1853–1915); Swedish-Norwegian archaeologist, excavated Oseberg Ship	1853	1915		Archaeologist	
Adolf Appellöf	(1857 in Garde – 1921); Marine zoologist, particularly in cephalopods	1857	1921	Garde	Zoologist	
Henrik Munthe	(1860 in När – 1958); Geologist, particularly the Geology of Gotland	1860	1958	När	Geologist	
Gustaf Hägg	(1867 in Visby - 1925); Organist and composer	1867	1925	Visby	Musician	
Ivar Sandström	(1889 in Visby — 1917); Aviation pioneer	1889	1917	Visby	Pilot	
Gustaf Dalstrom	(1893-1971); American artist and muralist, from 1927 president of the Chicago Society of Artists	1893	1971		Artist	
Torsten Sylvan	(1895 in Visby – 1970); Army officer and horse rider, silver medallist in the 1924 Summer Olympics	1895	1970	Visby	Officer	
Diana Allen	(1898-1949); Actress and Ziegfeld girl	1898	1949		Actress	
Martin Bodin	(1903–1976); Cinematographer	1903	1976		Cinematographer	
Hjördis Petterson	(1908 in Visby – 1988); Actress	1908	1988	Visby	Actress	
Robert Myrsten	(1909 in Slite – 1976); Swedish ship-owner	1909	1976	Slite	Ship-owner	
Einar Englund	(1916 – 1999 in Visby); Finnish composer	1916	1999	Visby	Composer	
Ingmar Bergman	(1918–2007); Director, writer and producer who worked in film, television, theatre and radio; lived and died on Fårö	1918	2007	Fårö	Director	
Carl Bertil Myrsten	(1920 in Slite– 2000); Company director and ship-owner	1920	2000	Slite	Ship-owner	
Sonja Åkesson	(1926 in Buttle – 1977); Poet, writer and artist	1926	1977	Buttle	Artist	
Lars Gullin	(1928 in Sanda – 1976); Jazz saxophonist	1928	1976	Sanda	Musician	
Maj Bylock	(1931 in Visby – 2019); Children's writer, translator, and teacher	1931	2019	Visby	Writer	
Guje Sevón	(born 1943 in Sanda); Swedish and Finnish academician in psychology and management	1943		Sanda	Academician	
Mertil Melin	(born in Stånga 1945); Retired Army general, section head in Gotland 1982/1987	1945	2023	Stånga	General	
Alf Sandqvist	(born in Othem 1945); Retired Army major general, Inspector of the Army	1945		Othem	General	
Håkan Nesser	(born 1950); Author and teacher, writes crime fiction novels, lives in Furillen	1950		Furillen	Writer	
Lars Jonsson	(born 1950); Ornithological illustrator and artist living in Hamra.	1950		Hamra	Artist	
Babben Larsson	(born in Dalhem 1956) actress and comedian	1956		Dalhem	Actress	
Lennart Eriksson	(born 1956); Bass player in punk rock band Ebba Grön, lives on Gotland	1956			Musician	
Anna Jansson	(born in Visby 1958); Crime writer and nurse	1958		Visby	Writer	
Susanne Alfvengren	(born in Visby 1959); Singer	1959		Visby	Singer	
Håkan Loob	(born in Visby 1960); Former professional ice hockey player	1960		Visby	Ice hockey	
Jonas Jonasson	(born 1961); Journalist and writer, lives on Gotland	1961			Writer	
Josefin Nilsson	(1969 in När – 2016); Singer and actress	1969	2016	När	Singer	
Mattias Sunneborn	(born 1970 in Bunge); Long jumper, finalist in the 1996 Summer Olympics	1970		Bunge	Long jumper	
Frida Röhl	(born 1971 in Klintehamn); Actress and director	1971		Klintehamn	Actress	
Theresa Andersson	(born 1971); Singer-songwriter and multi-instrumentalist	1971			Musician	
Thomas Löfkvist	(born in Visby 1984); Former professional road bicycle racer	1984		Visby	Bicycle racer	
Alexander Gerndt	(born 1986 in Visby); Footballer, nearly 300 club caps and 10 for Sweden	1986		Visby	Footballer	
Linnea Gustafsson	(born 1986 in Fole); Orienteering competitor.	1986		Fole	Orienteering competitor	
Grave	(formed 1986); Death metal band, features vocalist and guitarist Ola Lindgren	1986			Musicians	
Jesper Skalberg Karlsson	(born in Visby 1993); Politician, Member of the Riksdag from 2015/2018, representing Gotland County	1993		Visby	Politician	
