= Hakkemose Brickworks =

Former Danish brickyard

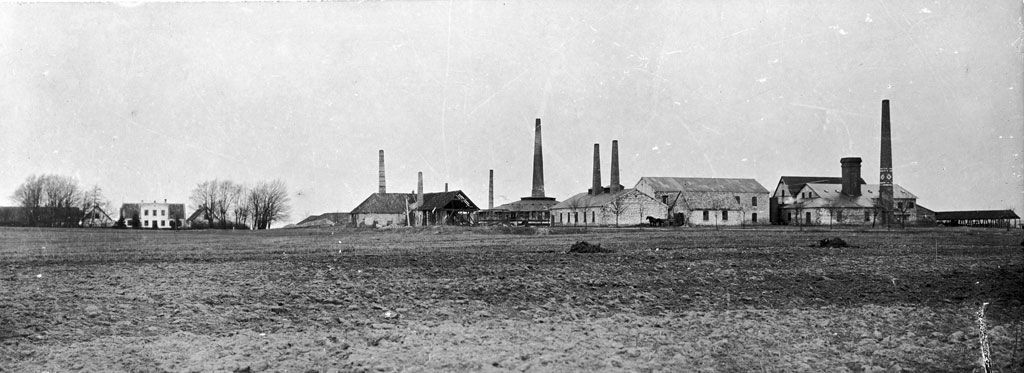
Hakkemose Brickworks

Hakkemose Brickworks (Danish: Hakkemose Teglværk) was a Danish brickyard and ceramics factory located at Taastrup, Denmark. The central lake in Hakkemosen is its former clay pit.

== History ==
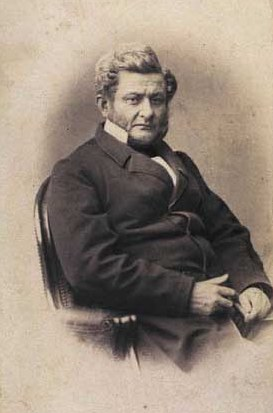
Johannes Peter Langgaard photographed by P. C. Koch

Inventor and mechanic Johannes Peter Langgaard purchased the farm Hakkemose at Taastrup in 1847 and founded the brickyard at the site on 10 November that same year.

Langgaard had studied the latest technological trends in Germany and constructed a machine for the production of bricks. In 1868, he also began the construction of a Hoffmann kiln with 15 chambers. Each chamber had room for 22,500 bricks.

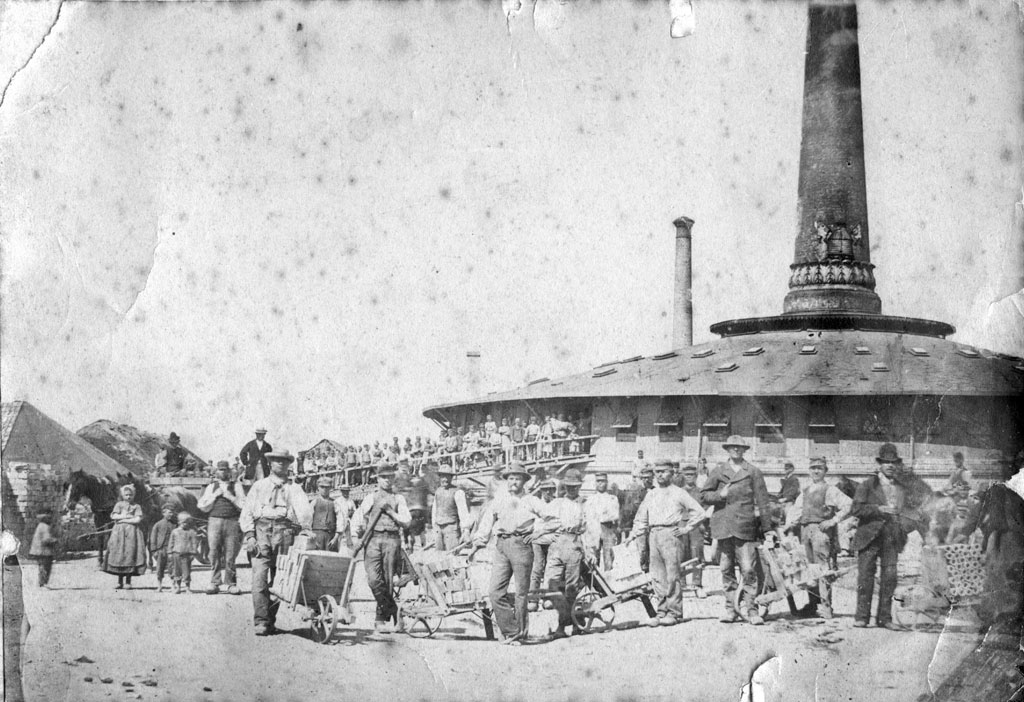
The Hoffmann kiln

Hakkemose Brickworks had by the 1870s developed into the largest brickyard in the country. It produced 7 million bricks in 1872. In 1883, it also started a production of terracotta objects and faience cocklestoves. The brickyard was represented and won awards on the 1872 Nordic Exhibition in Copenhagen and again on the Nordic Exhibition of 1888.

Langgaard died in 1890 and his heirs sold the brickyard to a British consortium in 1895. The clay deposits had been depleted in 1908 and the Hoffmann kiln was demolished in 1909. The factory was from then on used for production of ceramic objects and tiles. Morten Korch was managing director of the factory from October 1909 to September 1911. It closed in 1915.

== Legacy ==
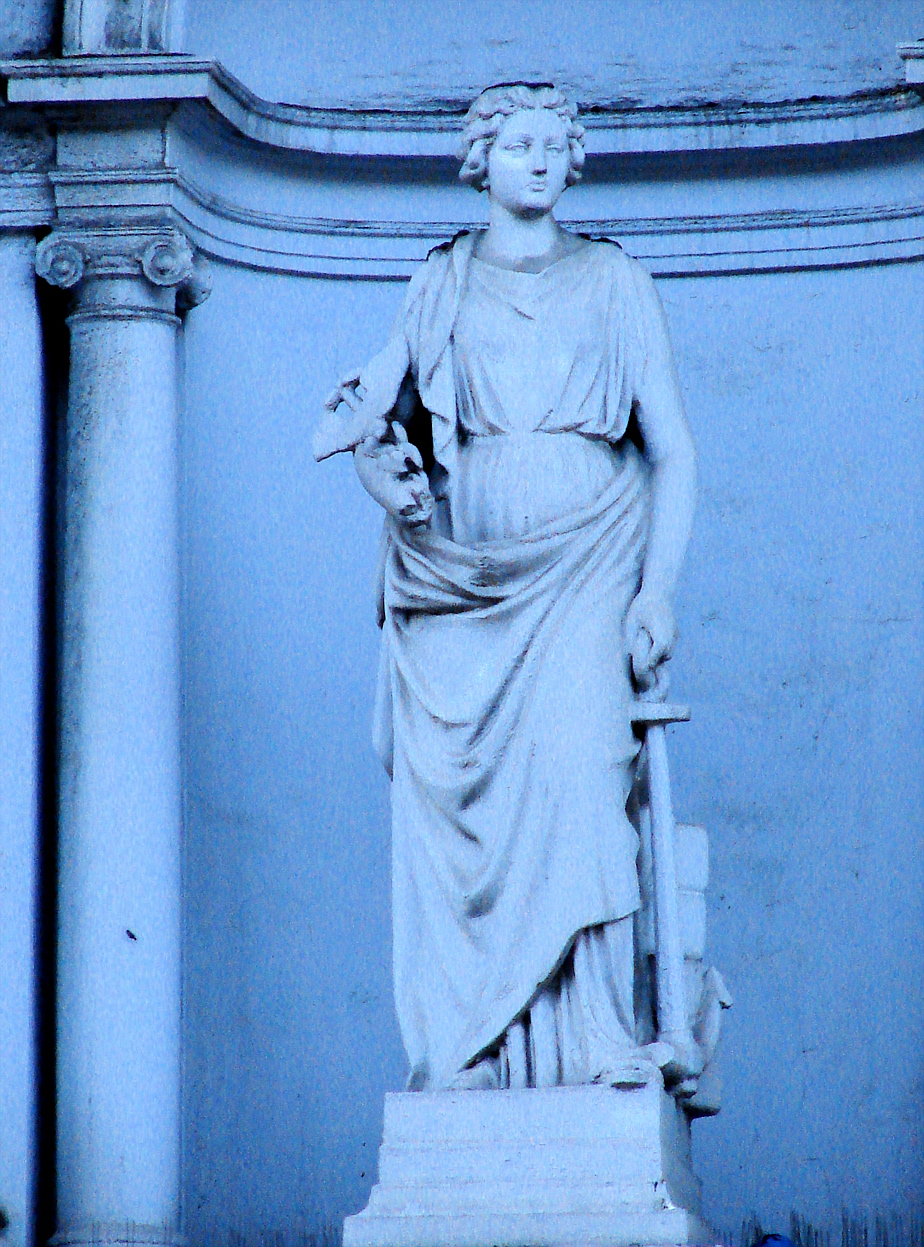
Vesterbrogade 2B. Sculpture on the facade of Axelhus

All the brickyard buildings have been demolished. Hakkemosegård's main wing was demolished in the 1990s. Charlottegård, which was built for Langgaard in 1858 and named after his wife, has survived. The central lake in Hakkemosen is its former clay pit.

Bricks from Hakkemosegaard are stamped with J. P. Langgard's name and trademark. The trademark featured a bee hive. Buildings constructed with bricks from Hakkemose include Vridsløselille State Prison, Sankt Hans Hospital and Axelhus at Vesterbrogade 2B, Axelhus was built for Langgaard in 1874. The sculptures on the facade and Countess Danner's coat of arms at Jægerspris Castle was also produced at Hakkemose Brickworks.

== See also ==
- Urban Jürgensen
