= Ann Jansson =

Ann Jansson may refer to:

- Ann Jansson (racewalker) (born 1958), Swedish racewalker
- Ann Jansson (footballer) (born 1957), Swedish association football player

== See also ==
- Anna Jansson
