= Johannes Peter Langgaard =

Danish composer

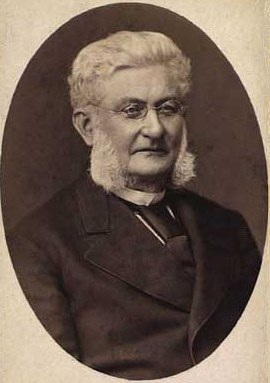
- Langgaard photographed by Budtz Müller
- Born: 12 May 1811; Copenhagen, Denmark
- Died: 24 July 1890 (aged 79); Copenhagen, Denmark
- Occupations: Businessman and inventor

Johannes Peter Langgaard (12 May 1811 – 24 July 1890) was a Danish mechanician and brickyard owner. He established Hakkemose Brickworks at Taastrup in 1847.

== Early life and education ==
Langgaard was born on 12 May 1811 in Copenhagen, the son of watchmaker Jens Bartholomæus Langgaard (1782–1832) and Marie Christiane Harm(s) (1784–1822). His father had studied watch-making in Aalborg but moved to Copenhagen in 1806 where he became the manager and eventually owner of a large clock and instrument business. He went bankrupt in connection with the Danish state bankruptcy of 1813. The family then moved to first Berlin and later, Landsberg an der Warthe. After his father's death, Langgaard apprenticed as a watchmaker on Rugen and then moved to Copenhagen where he was employed in Urban Jürgensen. He also brought his younger siblings back to Copenhagen.

== Career ==
In 1834, Langgaard established the first orthopedic clinic in Denmark at Store Tuborg and was granted a ten-year monopoly. This happened after he had completed studies at Frederiksberg Hospital's Department of Surgery and carried out a successful experiment on a young, hunchbacked girl. Langgaard ran the clinic until 1851.

Langgaard was also a prolific inventor. In 1849, he obtained a patent on an orthopedic machine which attracted international attention at the Great Exhibition in London in 1851. He also created a strongman game called The Bull's Head (Tyrehovedet) for Tivoli Gardens as well as a number of other rides for Dyrehavsbakken and other amusement parks. He also obtained a number of other patents, for instance on steam-pipe kettles (rørdampkedler) and inventions related to his interest in the clay industry.

Langgaard purchased the farm Hakkemose at Taastrup in 1847 and established Hakkemose Brickworks on 10 November that same year. It developed into the largest brickyard in the country. He also established a production of earthenware and ceramic stoves at the site. His heirs sold it to a British consortium in 1895.

== Personal life ==
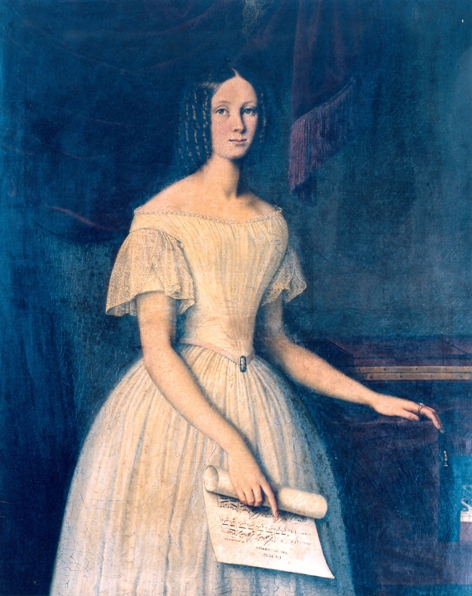
Charlotte Seydewitz

Langgaard married twice. His first wife was Henriette Catharine Frederikke Conradine Treschow (1818–1847), a daughter of Andreas Treschow (1794–1846) and Anne Marie Wendel (1797–1864). They were married on 17 December 1835 in Christiansborg Chapel. His second wife was Charlotte Sophie Magdalene Seydewitz (1826-1891), a daughter of Major Carl Christian S. (1777–1857) and Sophie Amalie Møller (1792–1863). They married on 20 March 1849 in the Garrison Church in Copenhagen. He was the father of pianist and composer Siegfried Langgaard and the grandfather of organist and composer Rued Langgaard.

He was awarded the honorary title of justitsråd in 1854 and etatsråd in 1886. He died on 24 July 1890 and is buried in Frederiksberg Old Cemetery

== See also ==
- Larpent & Jürgensen
