= List of shipwrecks in April 1884 =

The list of shipwrecks in April 1884 includes ships sunk, foundered, grounded, or otherwise lost during April 1884.

== 1 April ==
List of shipwrecks: 1 April 1884
Ship	State	Description
Augvald	Norway	The barque collided with another vessel in the English Channel off St. Catherine's Point, Isle of Wight, United Kingdom and was severely damaged. She was on a voyage from Hamburg, Germany to Baltimore, Maryland, United States. She put in to Cowes, Isle of Wight in a leaky condition.
C. E. Suhr	Denmark	The ship departed from Akassa, Africa for a European port. No further trace, reported missing.
Isabella	United Kingdom	The schooner was driven ashore near Drummore, Wigtownshire. She was on a voyage from Liverpool, Lancashire to Girvan, Ayrshire.
James Cann	United Kingdom	The Thames barge collided with the schooner Carmenta (United Kingdom) and sank in the River Thames at Cliffe, Kent.
Herald	United Kingdom	The paddle steamer sank off North Head, Sydney Harbour, New South Wales, after suffering a boiler explosion. Both men aboard escaped safely in one of her boats.

== 2 April ==
List of shipwrecks: 2 April 1884
Ship	State	Description
Helikon	Germany	The ship was sighted off Dover, Kent, United Kingdom whilst on a voyage from Hull, Yorkshire to Sydney, New South Wales. No further trace, reported missing.

== 3 April ==
List of shipwrecks: 3 April 1884
Ship	State	Description
Alba	Denmark	The barque was wrecked at Sandwich, Kent, United Kingdom with the loss of fifteen of the nineteen people on board. She was on avoyage from Copenhagen to Greenland.
Daniel Steinmann	Belgium	The steamer ran aground on the Madrock Shoal, off Sambro Island, Nova Scotia, Canada, with the loss of 121 of her 130 passengers and crew. She was on a voyage from Antwerp, Belgium to Halifax, Nova Scotia and New York, United States.
Rebecca Everingham	United States	The steamboat burned to the waterline at Fitzgerald Landing, Georgia, 28 nautical miles (52 km) above Eufaula, Alabama, before her mooring lines parted allowing her to drift 100 yards (91 m) down stream in the Chattahoochee River before sinking with the loss of twelve lives.

== 4 April ==
List of shipwrecks: 4 April 1884
Ship	State	Description
Viking	United States	The schooner was lost at "Newcomb's Hollow". Her crew were rescued.

== 5 April ==
List of shipwrecks: 5 April 1884
Ship	State	Description
Flying Cloud, or Flying Foam	United Kingdom	The brig was driven ashore in Dundrum Bay. One of the ship's boats capsized and all the occupants drowned. The rest of the crew landed in a second ship's boat or were brought ashore by the Newcastle Lifeboat Farnley ( Royal National Lifeboat Institution). The brig was on a voyage from Liverpool, Lancashire to Quebec City, Canada.

== 6 April ==
List of shipwrecks: 6 April 1884
Ship	State	Description
Odysseus	Greece	The brig collided with the steamship Nigel (United Kingdom) and sank in the Sulina branch of the Danube between 35 and 36 nautical miles (65 and 67 km) from its mouth.

== 8 April ==
List of shipwrecks: 8 April 1884
Ship	State	Description
Malacca	France	The barque was wrecked in the Indian Ocean 22 nautical miles (41 km) south west of the Dapres Shoal. Her crew were rescued. She was on a voyage from Chittagong to Calcutta, India.
Mazeppa	United Kingdom	The ship ran aground at Cardiff, Glamorgan.

== 9 April ==
List of shipwrecks: 9 April 1884
Ship	State	Description
Fornix	United Kingdom	The ship sprang a leak and foundered in the North Sea. Her crew were rescued by the fishing trawler Contest (United Kingdom). Fornix was on a voyage from Sunderland, County Durham to Christiania, Norway.

== 10 April ==
List of shipwrecks: 10 April 1884
Ship	State	Description
Azorean	United Kingdom	The ship sprang a leak and foundered 5 nautical miles (9.3 km) west of the Smalls Lighthouse, Cornwall. Her crew survived. She was on a voyage from Caernarfon to Cork.

== 11 April ==
List of shipwrecks: 11 April 1884
Ship	State	Description
Merrie England	United Kingdom	The steam yacht ran aground at Fort Genoves, Spain. She was refloated with the assistance of the steamship Alacrity (United Kingdom).

== 12 April ==
List of shipwrecks: 12 April 1884
Ship	State	Description
Lady Dalhousie	United Kingdom	The steamship struck the Chynoweth rock near The Manacles, Cornwall. Her crew were rescued. She was on a voyage from London to Newport, Monmouthshire.
William	United Kingdom	The schooner foundered off Belmullet, County Mayo. Her crew were rescued.

== 14 April ==
List of shipwrecks: 14 April 1884
Ship	State	Description
Little Sleightholm	Canada	The ship foundered at sea. Her crew were rescued by the barque Nerji (Austria-Hungary). Little Sleightholm was on a voyage from Bahia, Brazil to Halifax, Nova Scotia.

== 15 April ==
List of shipwrecks: 15 April 1884
Ship	State	Description
Speke Hall	United Kingdom	The steamship ran aground in the Hooghly River. She was refloated.

== 19 April ==
List of shipwrecks: 19 April 1884
Ship	State	Description
Ponema, and State of Florida	Canada; United Kingdom	The barque Ponema collided with the steamship State of Florida in the Atlantic Ocean 1,200 nautical miles (2,200 km) west of Ireland. Ponema sank with the loss of twelve of her fifteen crew. Survivors were rescued by the barque Theresa (Flag unknown). Ponema was on a voyage from Liverpool, Lancashire to Miramichi, New Brunswick, Canada. State of Florida sank with the loss of 123 of the 170 people on board. She was on a voyage from New York, United States to the Clyde. The steamship Titania (United Kingdom) rescued 24 crew of State of Florida. The barque Theresa also rescued survivors from the State of Florida.

== 21 April ==
List of shipwrecks: 21 April 1884
Ship	State	Description
Hebe	Denmark	The ship ran aground at Burghead, Moray, United Kingdom. She was on a voyage from Tromsø to Lossiemouth, Moray. She was later refloated and taken in to Lossiemouth in a severely leaky condition.

== 22 April ==
List of shipwrecks: 22 April 1884
Ship	State	Description
Attila	Norway	The barque was abandoned in the Atlantic Ocean. Her nine crew were rescued by the barque Altcar (Norway). Attila was on a voyage from Antwerp, Belgium to Philadelphia, Pennsylvania, United States.
Marion	United Kingdom	The schooner ran aground at Lerwick, Shetland Islands. She was refloated and taken in to Lerwick in a leaky condition.

== 23 April ==
List of shipwrecks: 23 April 1884
Ship	State	Description
Fanny	United Kingdom	The smack sprang a leak and foundered 4 nautical miles (7.4 km) off Sanda Island, Inner Hebrides. Her crew survived. She was on a voyage from Glenarm, County Antrim to Campbeltown, Argyllshire.
Sibil	United Kingdom	The Thames barge was run into by the steamship City of Truro (United Kingdom) and sank in the River Thames near Gravesend, Kent.
Sjofna	Norway	The steamship was driven ashore on Närsholmen, Gotland, Sweden. She was on a voyage from Newcastle upon Tyne, Northumberland, United Kingdom to Riga, Russia.

== 25 April ==
List of shipwrecks: 25 April 1884
Ship	State	Description
Diamanten	Sweden	The ship was driven on to the Lark Sand, in the Bristol Channel. She was refloated and taken in to Burnham-on-Sea, Somerset, United Kingdom in a waterlogged condition.
Ojofna	Sweden	The steamship was driven ashore at "Marsholm", Gotland. She was later refloated with assistance.
Rajah Brooke	Sarawak	The steamship collided with the steamship Glencarn (United Kingdom) and sank at Penang, Straits Settlements.

== 28 April ==
List of shipwrecks: 28 April 1884
Ship	State	Description
Saint Paul	United States	The schooner was wrecked on the coast of the Alaska Peninsula near Nikolaief, Department of Alaska. Both crew survived. She was on a voyage from Belkofski to Kodiak, Department of Alaska.

== 29 April ==
List of shipwrecks: 29 April 1884
Ship	State	Description
Falmouth	United States	The passenger ship burned and sank at dock in Portland, Maine. Three crew were killed.
Several unnamed vessels	Argentina	The lighters were sunk by a freshet at Buenos Aires.
Unnamed	France	The schooner was run down and sunk off Saint Pierre and Miquelon with the loss of twelve of her nineteen crew.

== 30 April ==
List of shipwrecks: 30 April 1884
Ship	State	Description
Unnamed	Flag unknown	The steamship was destroyed by fire off the coast of the Cape Colony.

== Unknown date ==
List of shipwrecks: Unknown date in April 1884
Ship	State	Description
Albert	France	The schooner was wrecked on the coast of Iceland. Her 24 crew survived.
Assyrien	France	The steamship was wrecked on Providence Atoll, Seychelles before 25 April. Her crew were rescued. She was on a voyage from Toulon Var to the Seychelles.
Cometen	Flag unknown	The ship ran aground in the Paraná River. She was refloated and taken in to Buenos Aires, Argentina in a leaky condition.
Glenhaven	United Kingdom	The ship capsized in the Atlantic Ocean. She was on a voyage from Darien, Georgia, United States to Cardiff, Glamorgan.
Horrox	Belgium	The steamship ran aground at Santos, Brazil. She was on a voyage from Santos to New York City, United States. She was later refloated with assistance and resumed her voyage.
Hoselaw	Flag unknown	The steamship was driven ashore at Sproge, Gotland, Sweden. She was later refloated with assistance.
Incemore	United Kingdom	The ship was driven ashore and damaged at "Perac", Ottoman Empire. She was on a voyage from Brăila, Romania to Antwerp, Belgium. She was later refloated and taken in to Constantinople, Ottoman Empire.
Island	Norway	The schooner was driven ashore west of Dysart, Fife, United Kingdom and sank.
Minatitlán	Mexico	The steamship was destroyed by fire at Coatzacoalcos.
Modesto	Flag unknown	The ship ran aground in the Paraná River. She was refloated and taken in to Buenos Aires in a leaky condition.
Napier	United Kingdom	The steamship ran aground at Maassluis, South Holland, Netherlands. She was refloated on 1 May.
Niord	United Kingdom	The barque was wrecked on the West Rocks, in the North Sea off the coast of Essex.
USS Ohio	United States	The decommissioned ship-of-the-line broke loose from her moorings at Greenport, Long Island, New York, and ran aground on Fanning Point on the south coast of Long Island. She was burned to the waterline there to ease the recovery of her fittings, and her wreck sank in 20 feet (6 m) of water.
Rosalie	United Kingdom	The ship ran aground at Antigua. She was later refloated.
Shadwan	United Kingdom	The steamship caught fire at sea. She was on a voyage from the East Indies to Suez, Egypt. The fire was extinguished.
Temo	Flag unknown	The ship ran aground in the Paraná River. She was refloated and taken in to Buenos Aires in a leaky condition.
Thorly	United Kingdom	The brig was lost in the Middle Deep, off the coast of Essex. Eight of her crew were rescued by the Harwich Lifeboat Albert Edward ( Royal National Lifeboat Institution).
Varnaes	Norway	The brig was abandoned in the Atlantic Ocean. Her crew werre rescued. She was on a voyage from Wilmington, Delaware to Hull, Yorkshire, United Kingdom.
Virgo Maria	Flag unknown	The ship ran aground in the Paraná River. She was refloated and taken in to Bueno Aires in a leaky condition.
Wallachia	United Kingdom	The ship was driven ashore on Sherbro Island before 14 April. She was refloated eight days later.
