= Robert Myrsten =

Swedish ship-owner (1909–1976)

Gustaf Robert Myrsten (2 December 1909 – 23 January 1976) was a Swedish ship-owner.

== Early life ==
Myrsten was born on 2 December 1909 in Othem Parish, Gotland, Sweden, the son of captain Gustaf Myrsten and his wife Märtha (née Löfvenberg). He was the brother of Carl Bertil Myrsten. He passed his real exam and studied at Barlock Business School and then did a year of internship.

== Career ==
Myrsten was employed at shipbroking offices in England and Germany from 1932 to 1933. Myrsten was an authorized shipping agent for Gotland, CEO and director of Rederi AB Volo from 1947 and CEO of AB Robert Myrsten from 1950.

He was a member of the National Board for the Granting of Loans on Small Ships (Statens lånenämnd för den mindre skeppsfarten) in 1957 and was a member of the Executive Committee and Board of Directors for The Baltic and International Maritime Conference in Copenhagen. Myrsten was a board member of the Swedish Shipowners' Association (Sveriges Redareförening) and Rederi AB Gotland and was a member of the Stockholm Mercantile Marine Office Board (Stockholms sjömansnämnd), the city council and the Slite port directorate and was chairman of Slite Association of the Right (Slite högerförening) from 1959 to 1962.

== Personal life and death ==
In 1940, Myrsten married Birgitta Hartzell (1912–2012), the daughter of captain Nils Hartzell and Cecilia Petterson. He was the father of Ann-Sofie (born 1940).

Myrsten died on 23 January 1976 in Othem Parish, Gotland, Sweden. Myrsten was interred at Othem Cemetery on Gotland.

== Awards ==
- (Sweden) Knight of the Order of Vasa
