= Jules Jürgensen =

Danish watchmaking company

Jules Jürgensen was a Swiss watchmaking company founded by Jules Fredrik Jürgensen. The Swiss authorities treated the company as a branch of Urban Jürgensen & Sonner in Copenhagen.

== History ==
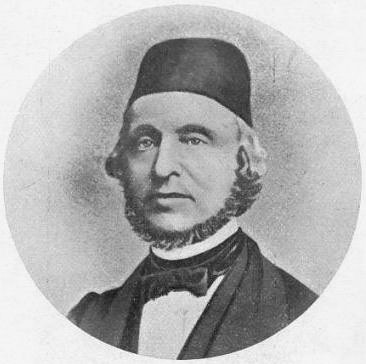
Jules Frederik Jürgensen (1808–1877)

The company traced its roots to the year 1740, when the Danish watchmaker Jürgen Jürgensen went into partnership with Isaac Larpent, under the name "Larpent & Jürgensen". Upon Jürgen's death in 1811, his son Urban Jürgensen took over the company. Following Urban's death in 1830 the Danish company continued its operations as Urban Jürgensen & Sønner, while one of Urban's sons, Jules Frederik, moved to Switzerland and established a subsidiary branch.

By 1919, Ed. Heuer & Co. purchased the Swiss Jürgensen operation and handled the regulation and assembly of Jules Jürgensen watches using ébauches (basic movement parts) from LeCoultre and Victorin Piguet; both were also suppliers to Patek Philippe. Jules Jürgensen was sold to a U.S.-based company in 1936, but watches were still produced in Switzerland until 1957, when the documentation shows the watches were made by other manufacturers and branded with the Jürgensen name. The company changed ownership twice during the 60's: first in 1965 when it was bought by Victor Hoff, and again in 1968 when the company was purchased by Downe Communications Inc.

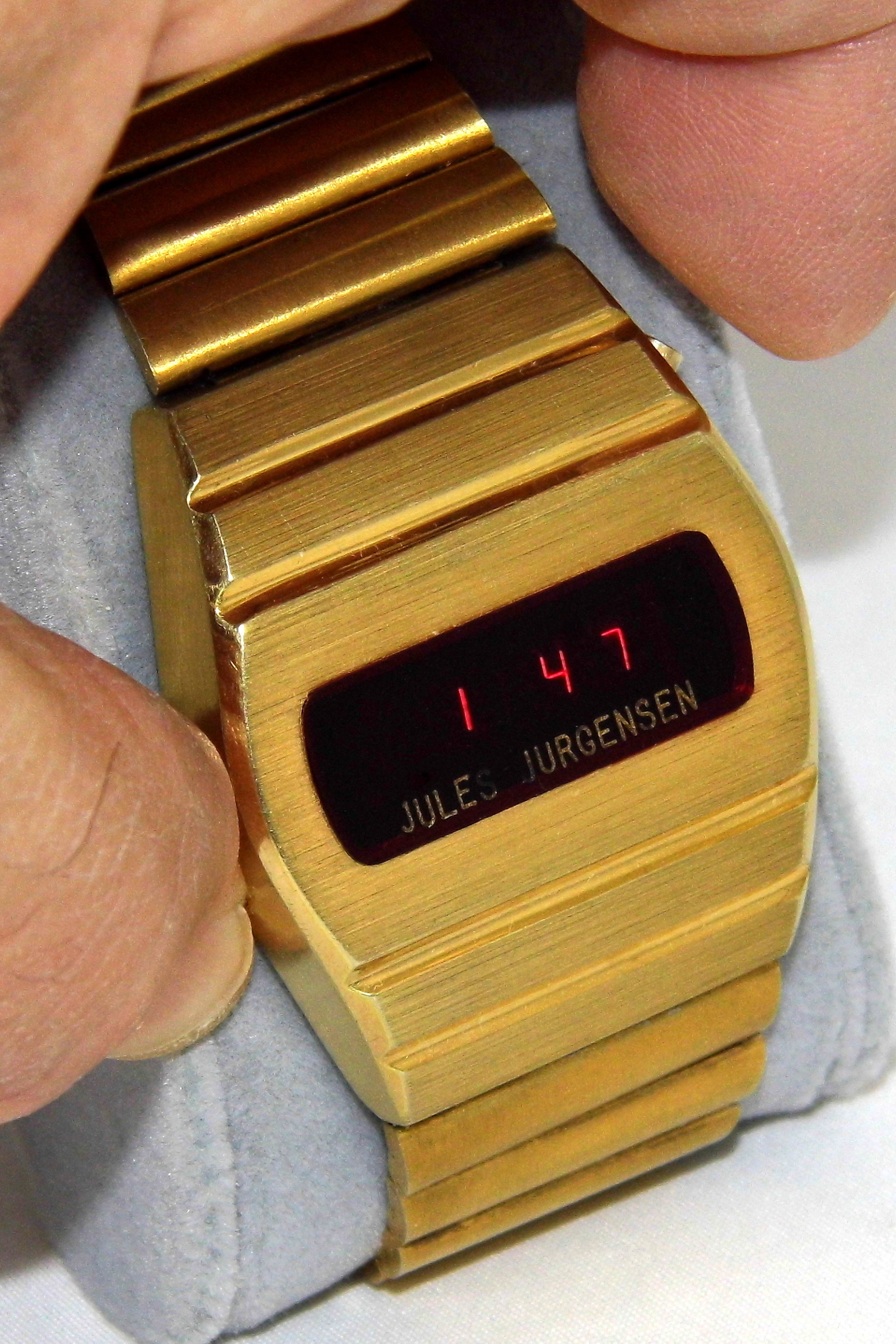
A Jules Jürgensen digital quartz watch from the 1970s.

During the Quartz crisis in 1974, Mort Clayman, a watch distributor in the U.S. and owner of Rhapsody watches, purchased the company. This marked the end of the era of Swiss Made Jules Jürgensen watches: During Clayman's ownership Jürgensen watches were assembled at Saint Croix in the US Virgin Islands using Japanese mechanical and quartz movements although some watches were still manufactured using Swiss parts. Assembly in the Virgin Islands was done in order to qualify as “American Made” and consequently avoiding import tariffs. According to the company's website, Rhapsody has ceased operation, but is still honoring warranties. Mort Clayman died in January 2010, and his survivors closed the company. In 2011, Dr. Helmut Crott, owner of Urban Jürgensen & Sønner acquired the rights from the Clayman family.

In 2025 a 18 carat gold Jules Jürgensen pocket watch formerly belonging to Titanic passenger Isidor Straus sold for record £1.78m at auction.
