= Carl Bertil Myrsten =

Swedish director and ship-owner

Carl Bertil Myrsten (1 May 1920 – 28 July 2000) was a Swedish director and ship-owner.

== Early life ==
Myrsten was born on 1 May 1920 in Slite, Sweden, the son of ship owner Gustaf Myrsten and his wife Märta (née Löfvenberg). He was the brother of Robert Myrsten. He passed studentexamen in Visby in 1940 and enrolled at Frans Schartau Business Institute in 1943.

== Career ==
Myrsten became reserve officer in 1945 and was CEO and owner of Rederi AB Slite from 1947. Rederi AB Slite, which Myrsten formed in 1946, went bankrupt in 1993.

Myrsten was a member of Neptuniorden and vice chairman of Gotland guild.

== Personal life and death ==
In 1948, Myrsten married Britt-Marie Rodhe (born 1920), the daughter of the accountant Esaias Rodhe and Mia Nosslin. He was the father of Charlotte (born 1949), Gerd (born 1951), Elise (born 1953) and Gustaf (born 1956).

Myrsten died on 28 July 2000 and was interred at Othem Cemetery on Gotland together with his parents sea captain Johan Gustaf Myrsten (1877–1946) and Maria, née Löfvenberg (1884–1956).

== Awards and decorations ==
- (Sweden) H. M. The King's Medal, 8th size gold (silver-gilt) medal worn on the chest suspended by the Order of the Seraphim ribbon (1989)
