= När Lighthouse =

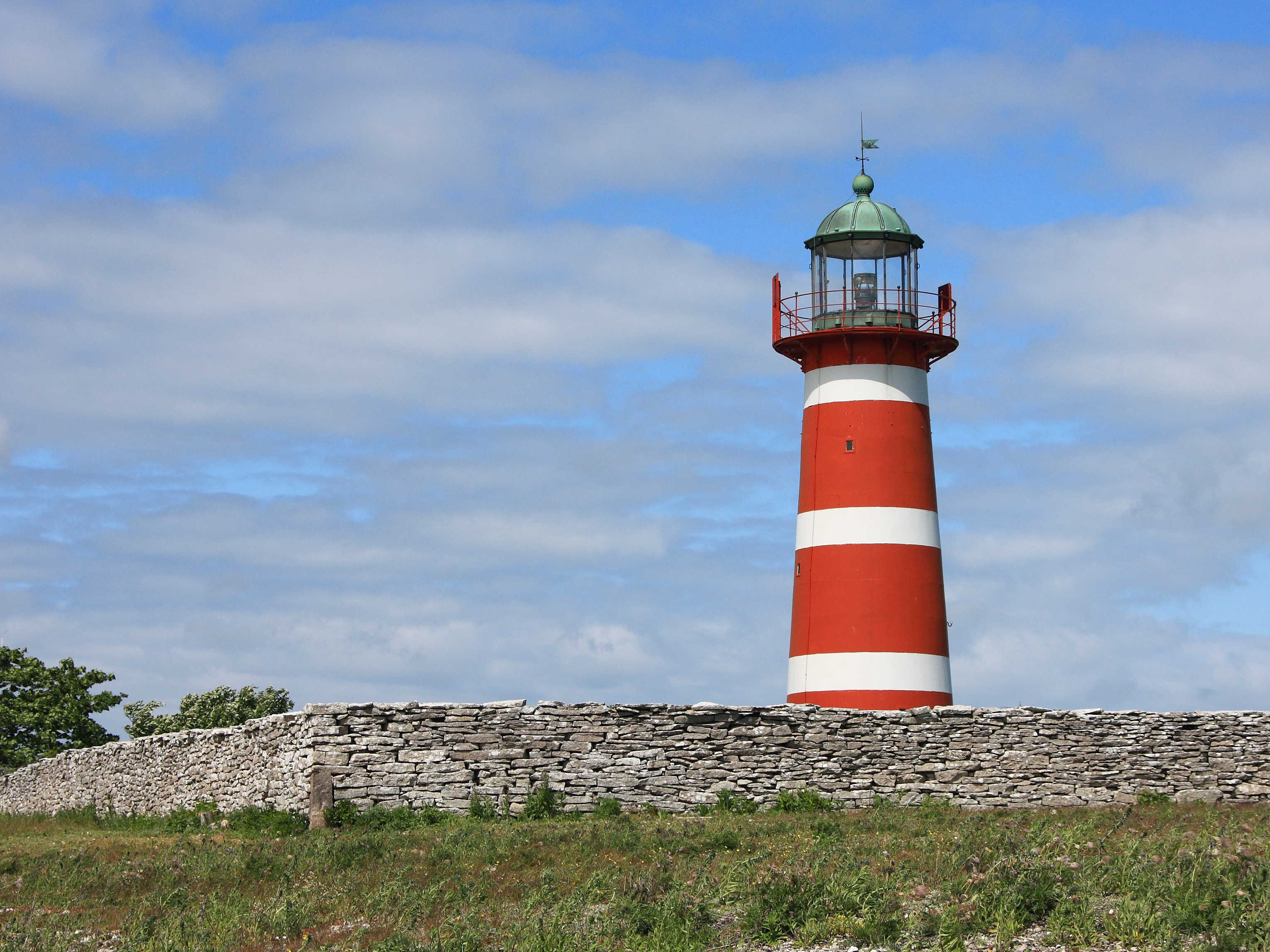
- När Lighthouse
- Location: Närsholmen; Gotland; Sweden
- Coordinates: 57.218312°N 18.681091°E

Tower
- Constructed: 1872
- Construction: cast iron tower
- Automated: 1961
- Height: 16.3 metres (53 ft)
- Shape: tapered cylindricall tower with balcony and lantern
- Markings: red tower with three narrow white bands, greenish lantern dome
- Power source: kerosene, acetylene, electricity
- Operator: Swedish Maritime Administration (Sjöfartsverket)
- Heritage: governmental listed building complex, governmental listed building

Light
- Focal height: 20.8 metres (68 ft)
- Lens: 3rd order rotating Fresnel lens (original), 4th order dioptric lens (1961)
- Range: white: 16.5 nautical miles (30.6 km; 19.0 mi) red: 13.5 nautical miles (25.0 km; 15.5 mi)
- Characteristic: Oc WR 8s.
- Sweden no.: SV-4190

När Lighthouse is a Swedish lighthouse located outside the village När on the southeast side of the island Gotland. It was constructed in 1872, the sketchings were made by architect John Höjer. It is located in a nature reserve and birding area. It is a listed building in Sweden.

The light originally carried a kerosene lamp and it was updated with electric power in 1961. It was also automated that same year, and the rotating lens was replaced by a modern one. It is owned by the Swedish Maritime Administration.

== Gallery ==
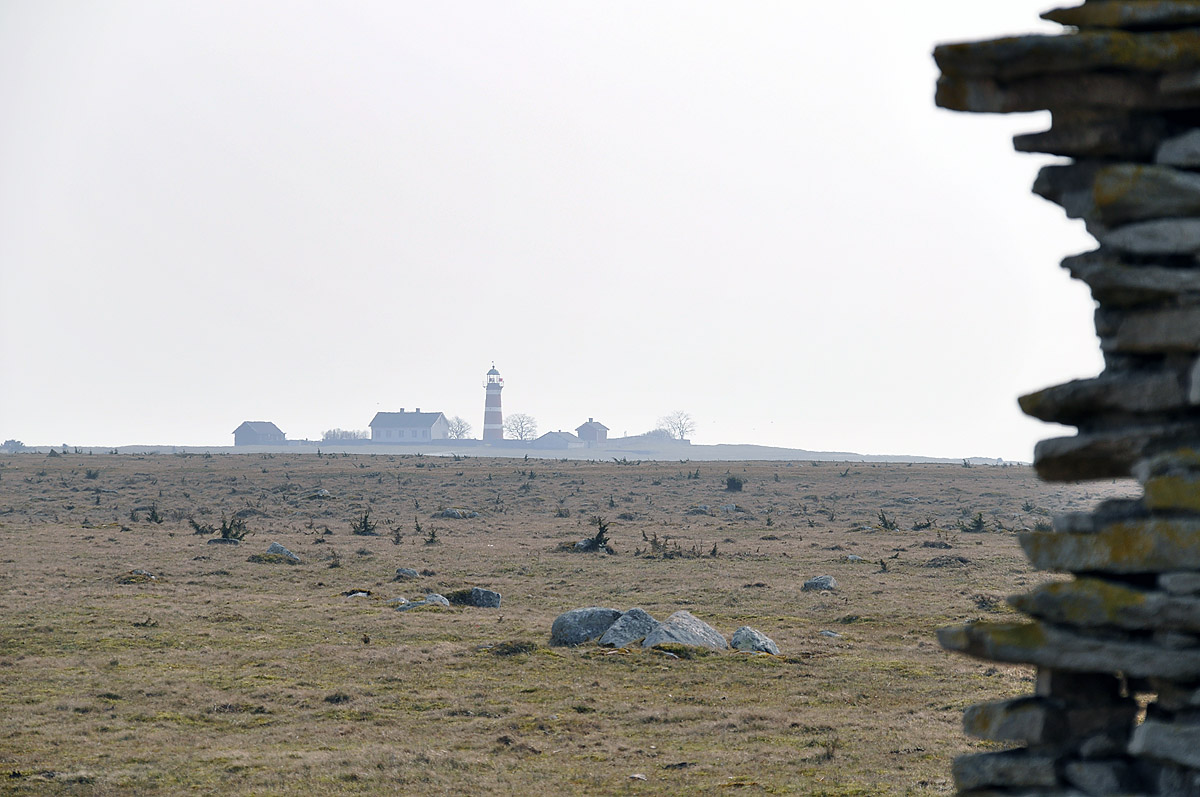
The light station as seen from a distance.

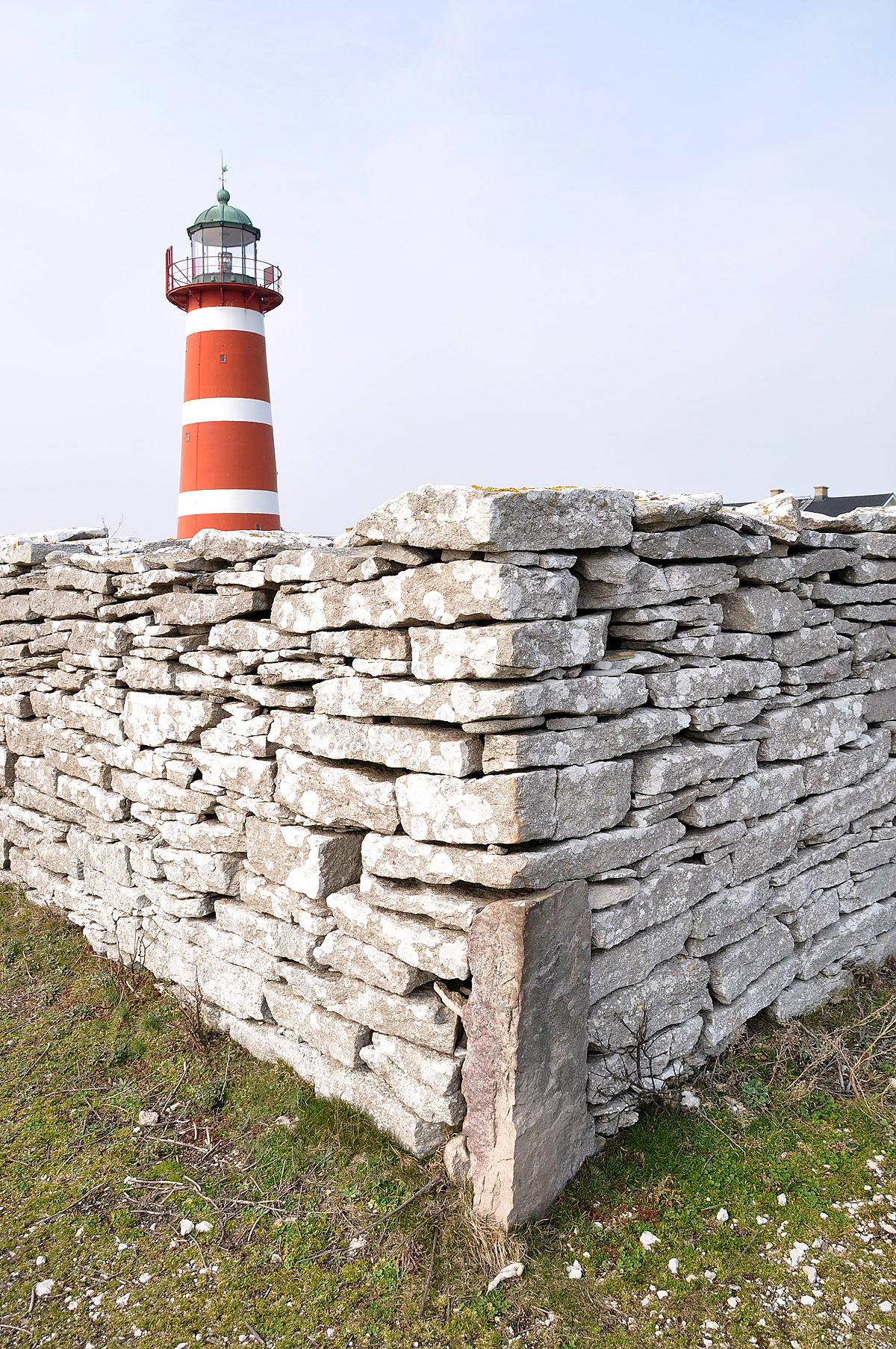
Stone wall near the lighthouse.

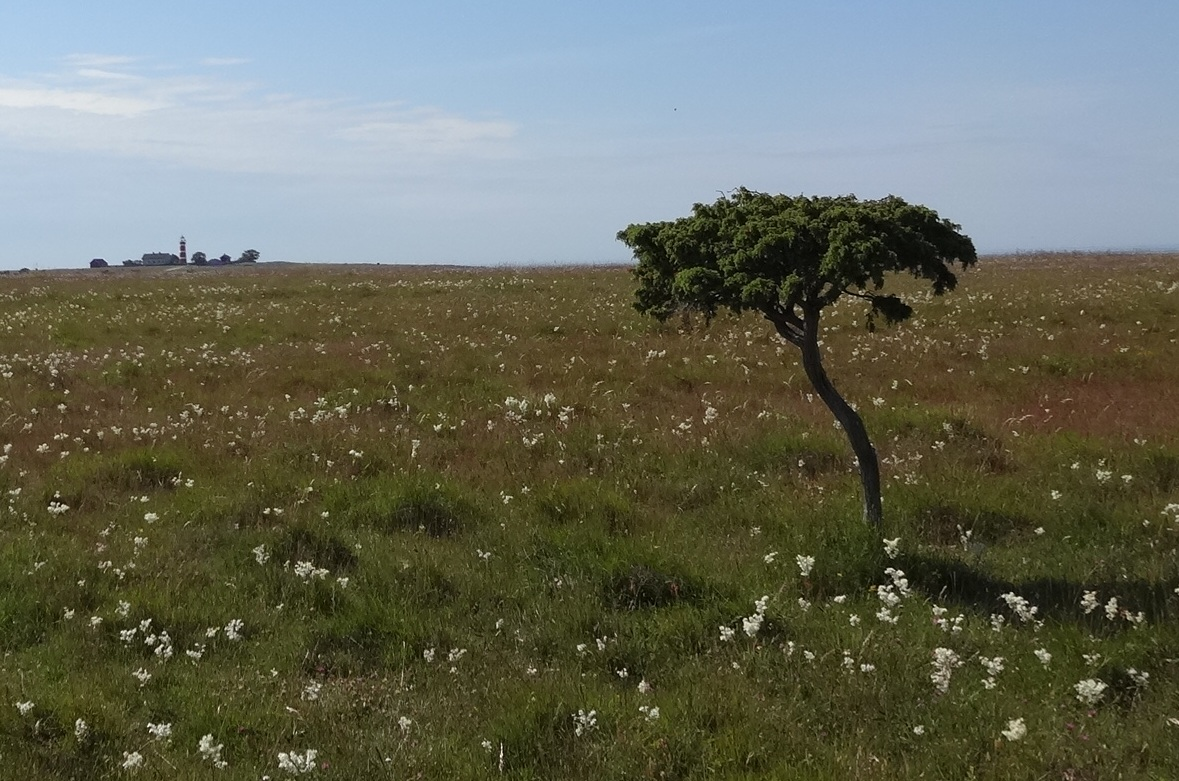
Sparse vegetation surrounds this light station.

== See also ==
- List of lighthouses and lightvessels in Sweden
