= När =

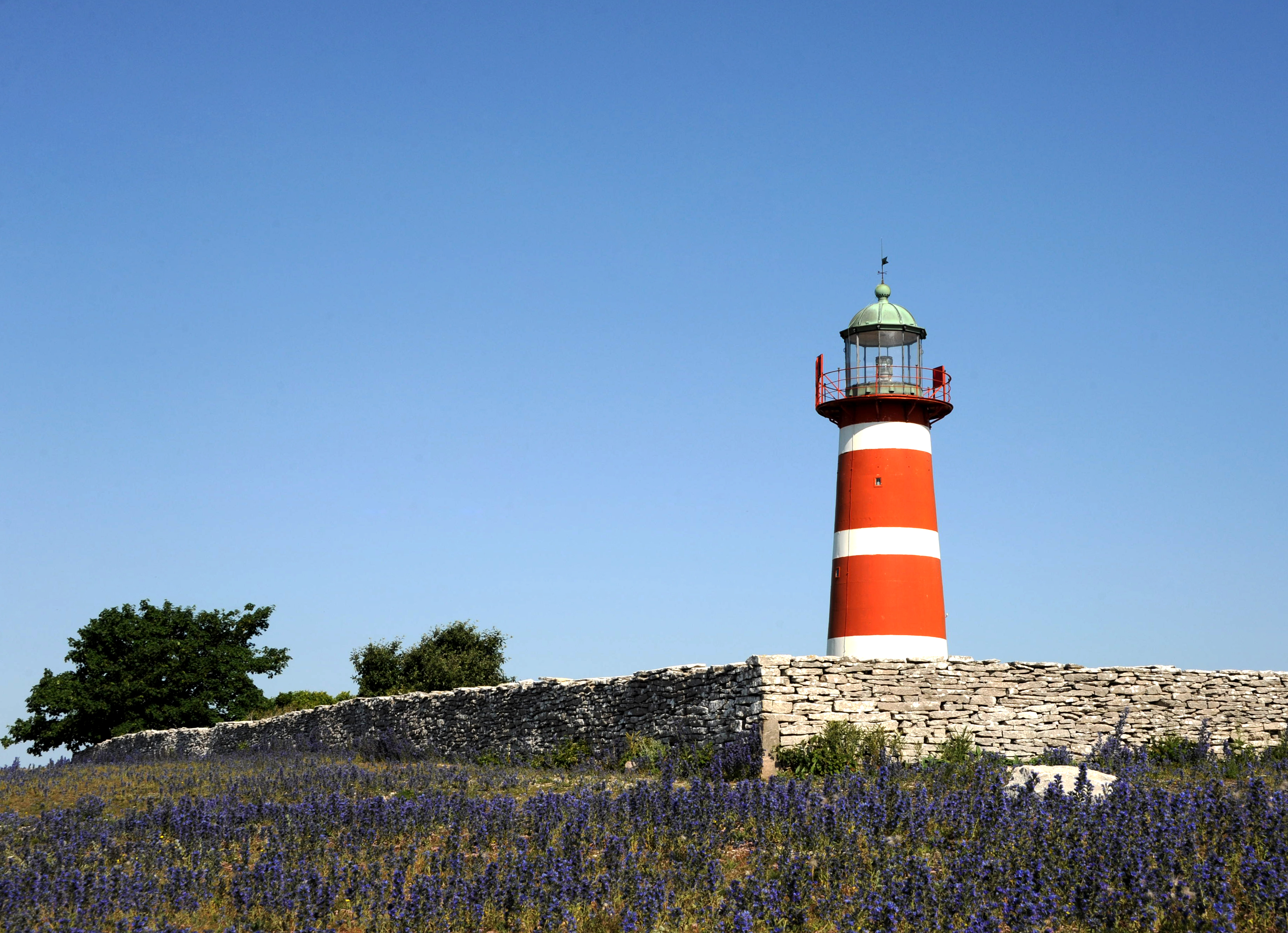
- När Lighthouse

- Location within Gotland
- Coordinates: 57°15′N 18°35′E
- Country: Sweden
- Province: Gotland
- County: Gotland County
- Municipality: Gotland Municipality

Area
  - Total: 0.75 km^{2} (0.29 sq mi)

Population (2014)
  - Total: 413
- Time zone: UTC+1 (CET)
  - Summer (DST): UTC+2 (CEST)

När is a populated area, a socken (not to be confused with parish), on the Swedish island of Gotland, with 413 inhabitants in 2014. It comprises the same area as the administrative När District, established on 1 January 2016.

The När Lighthouse is located east of the village on Närsholmen.

== Geography ==
När is the name of the socken as well as the district. It is also the name of the small village surrounding the medieval När Church, sometimes referred to as När kyrkby. It is situated on the east coast of Gotland.

As of 2019, När Church belongs to När-Lau parish in Burs pastorat, along with the church in Lau.

== Notable people ==
- Henrik Munthe (1860 in När – 1958) geologist, particularly the Geology of Gotland
- Josefin Nilsson (1969 in När – 2016) singer and actress
