= Victor Kullberg =

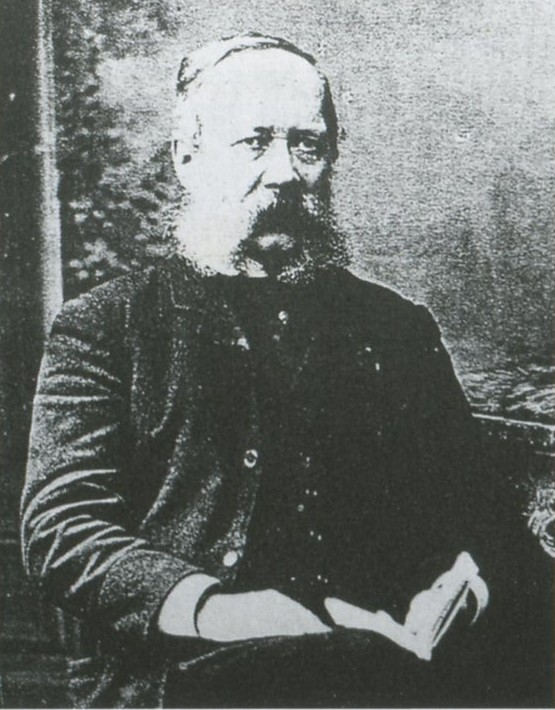
- Born: 13 August 1824; Visby, Gotland, Sweden
- Died: 7 July 1890 (aged 65); London
- Occupation: Watchmaker
- Known for: Marine chronometers

Victor Kullberg (1824–1890) was one of London's most famous watchmakers, described by one authority as "one of the most brilliant and successful horologists of the 19th century."

== Early life ==
Jakob Victor Kullberg was born in Visby on the Swedish island of Gotland on 13 August 1824 to Johan Kullberg and Hedvig Christina Ahlstrom. At the age of sixteen he was apprenticed to a local watchmaker where he learnt how to make every part of a chronometer by hand. At the end of his apprenticeship he travelled to Copenhagen where he entered the service of Louis Urban Jürgensen, son of the famous chronometer maker Urban Jürgensen. After attending the 1851 Great Exhibition Kullberg decided to relocate to London and start his own enterprise as an escapement maker.

== Career ==
Kullberg's superb escapements soon established his reputation as one of England's premier chronometer and watch manufacturers. His innovations in marine chronometers and other horological objects earned him nine gold medals, various silver medals, and ‘Grand Diploma of Honor’ at various Universal and national exhibitions. He regularly submitted his marine chronometers to the annual competition held at the Greenwich Observatory, winning ten times between 1862 and 1890, a record for any one person in the late 19th century. Kullberg is mostly known for his further development of compensation balances, eliminating middle-temperature errors, and his use of reverse fusée. His company V. Kullberg, was listed as maker to the Admiralty, The Indian & Colonial Governments and the navies of many countries. From the 1880s the company was run by his nephew Peter John Wennerström under the name of V. Kullberg. Following Peter's death in 1935 Sanfrid Lindquist was briefly in charge, until 1940 when the firm's premises at 105 Liverpool Road, Islington were destroyed by a bomb during the Blitz of London. The Kullberg Records survive as part of the Clockmakers' Company Library held at London's Guildhall.

== Later life ==
By 1876 it was reported that Kullberg had gone blind. In 1881 one of his timepieces won first prize in a Clockmakers Company competition, which also conferred the Freedom of the Company, an honour which he declined as it would have required him to become a naturalised British citizen. He died on 7 July 1890 at his home, 83 Tufnell Park Road, Islington, and is buried in a family grave on the west side of Highgate Cemetery. Right up to his death he was still entering his ever-improving marine chronometers into the annual Greenwich competitions and his final entry was said to be the finest instrument ever tried at the Royal Observatory, with a performance which was actually better than the Standard Clock against which it was measured.

== Gallery ==
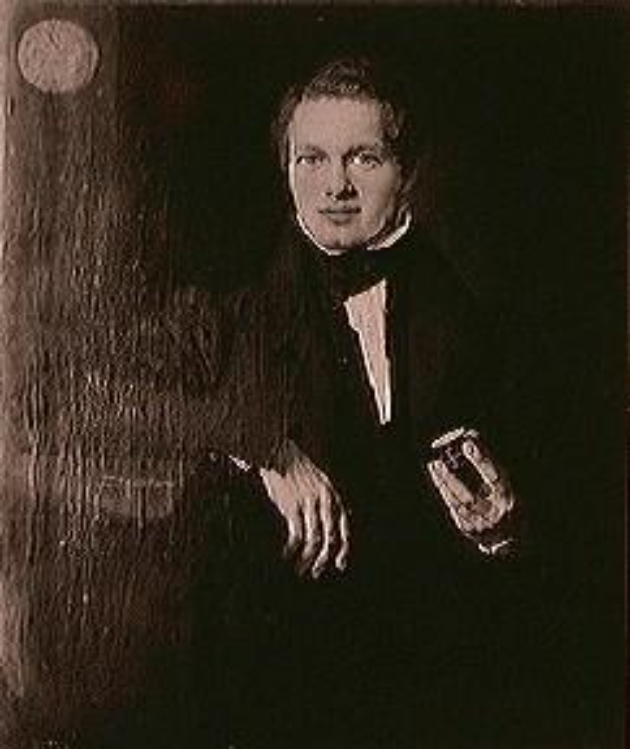
Louis Urban Jürgensen (1806–1867)

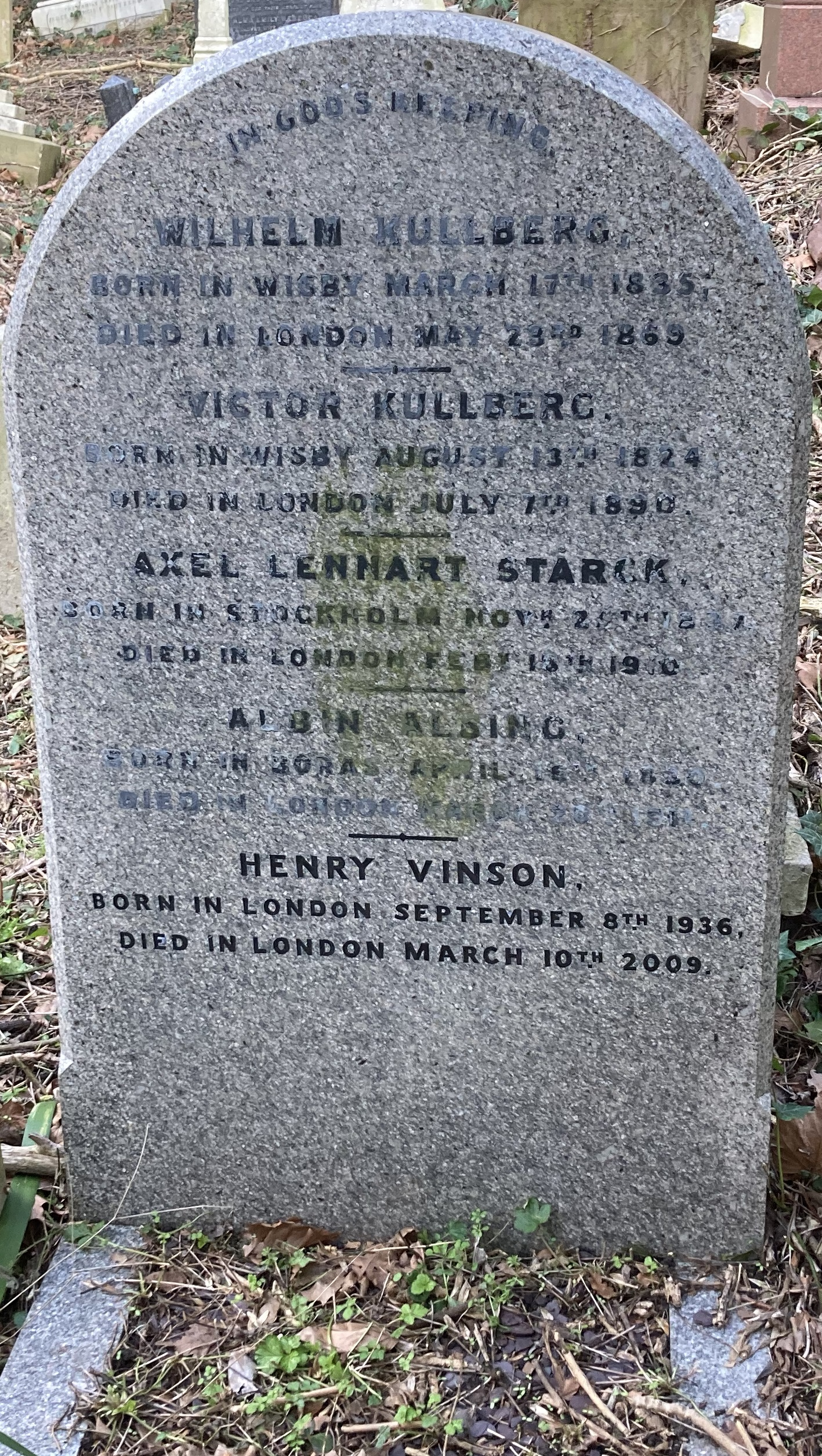
Family grave of Victor Kullberg in Highgate Cemetery
