= Närsholmen =

Peninsula and nature reserve in the country of Sweden

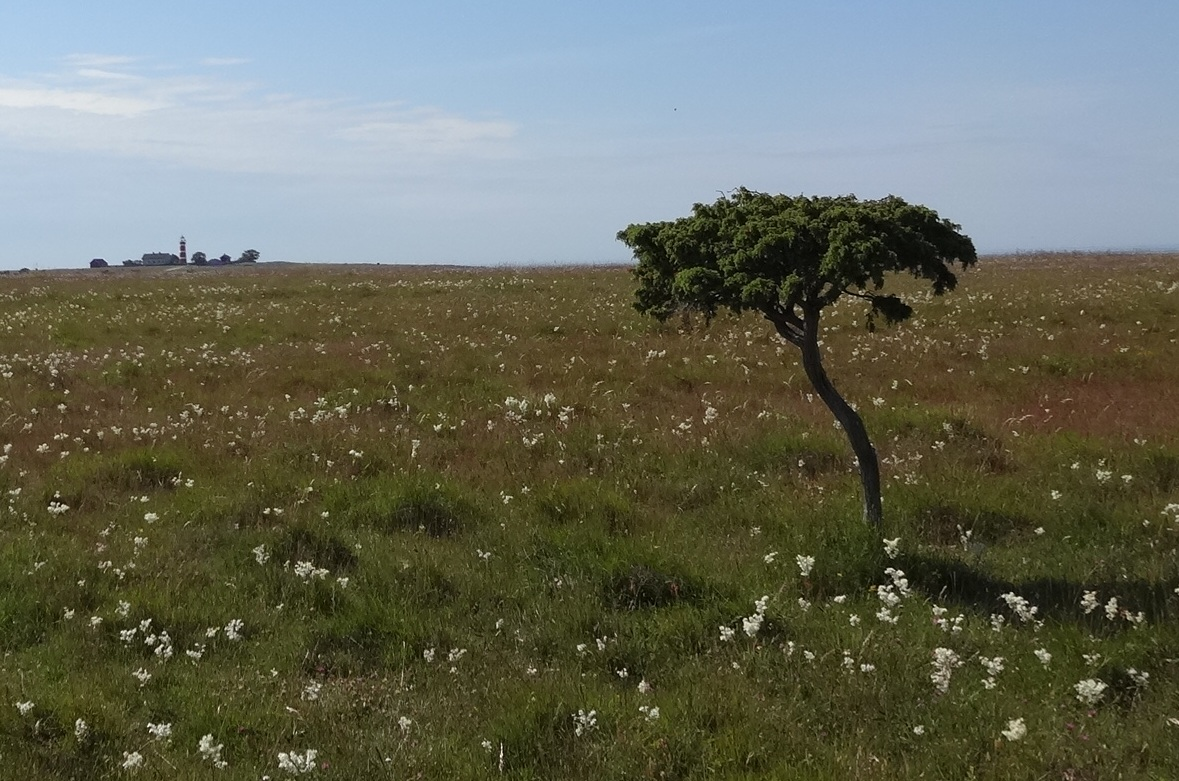
- The savanna-like landscape on Närsholmen

- Location within Gotland

Geography
- Location: Baltic Sea
- Coordinates: 57°14′0″N 18°41′0″E
- Area: 2 km^{2} (0.77 sq mi)

Administration
- Sweden

Additional information
- Official website: www.nar.se

Närsholmen is a peninsula and a nature reserve on the southeast coast of Gotland, Sweden, adjacent the village of När. The landscape is savanna-like and has a rich birdlife, about 45 species has been spotted, and a number of orchids. In the late part of summer, the peninsula is covered with Echium vulgare. The reserve was established in 1986. It was also designated as a Natura 2000 area.

The När Lighthouse is situated on the southern tip of the peninsula. The lighthouse played a role during the end of World War II when it was used as a beacon for refugees from the Baltic states crossing the Baltic Sea to Gotland.

Närsholmen was an island until the 18th century. During the Middle Ages and until the 16th century, the island was used as grazing grounds for the livestock of the Roma Abbey. The area was confiscated from the abbey by the Swedish government during the Swedish Reformation and is still used for grazing.

Närsholmen is most noted for being the location where film-maker Andrei Tarkovsky filmed the last scene of his last film, The Sacrifice.

In 2011, singer Lykke Li filmed the video for her song "I Follow Rivers", on Närsholmen. The music video was directed by Tarik Saleh and features Li and actor Fares Fares.

== Gallery ==
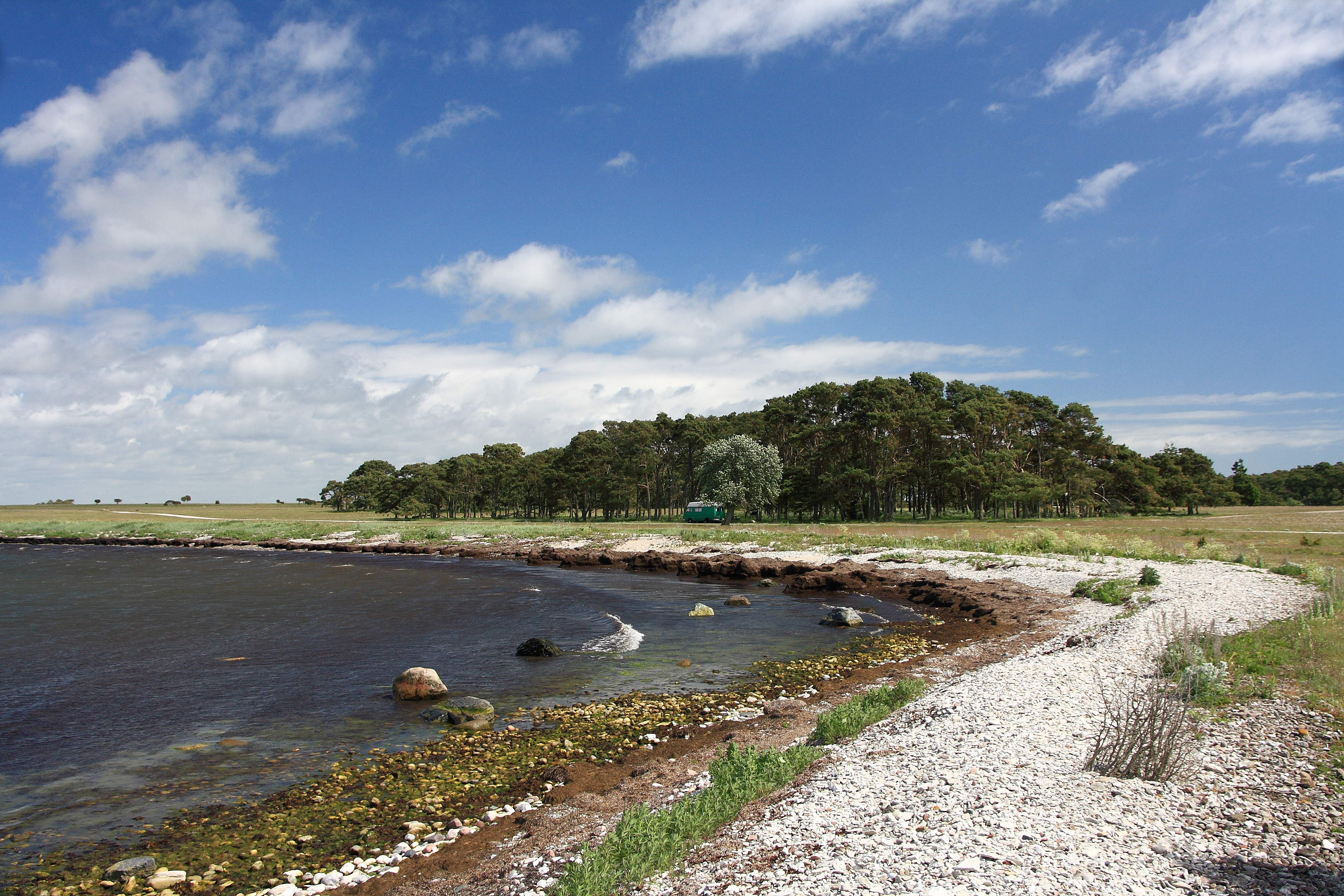
Beach on Närsholmen

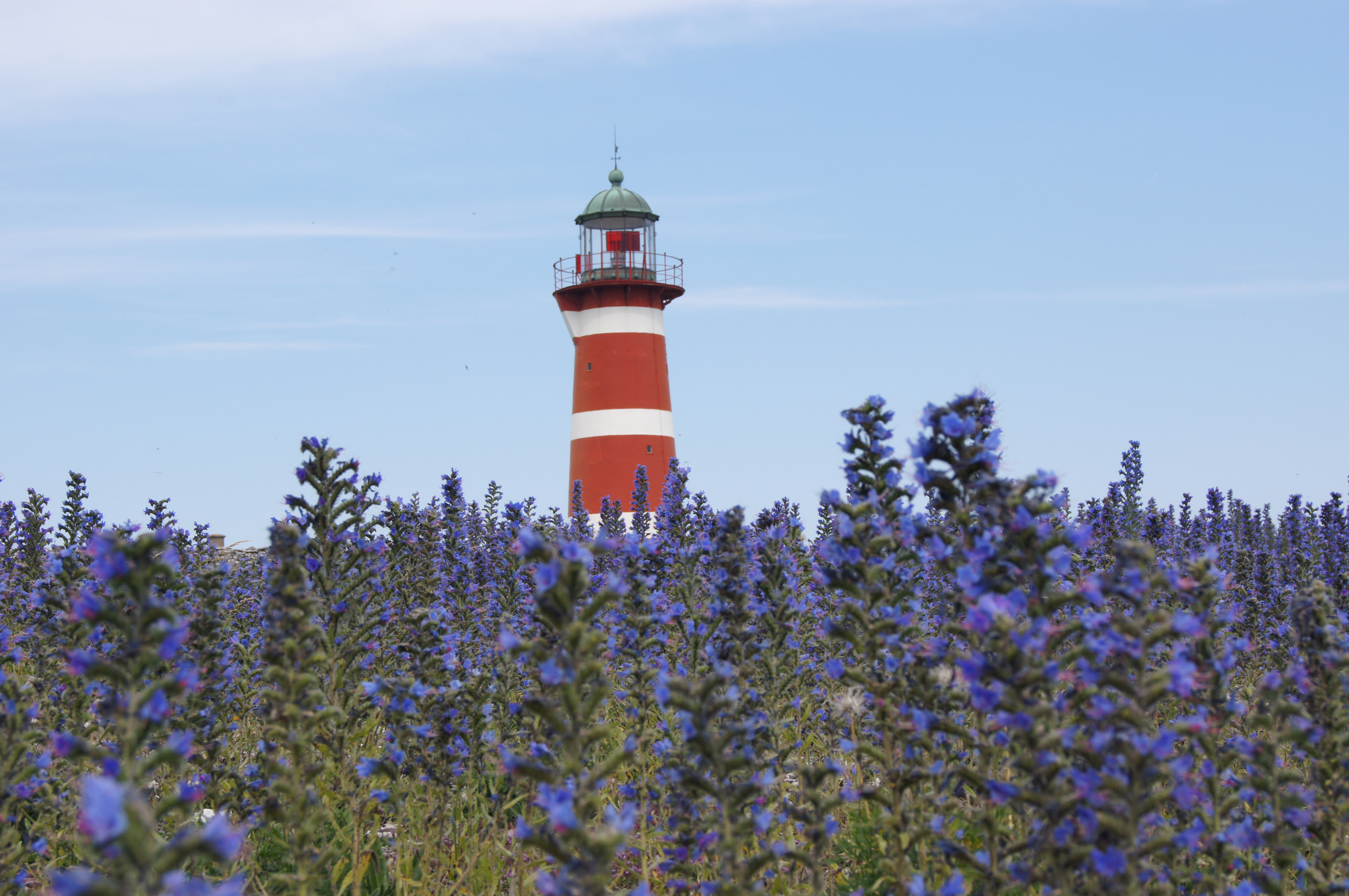
The När Lighthouse with Echium vulgare

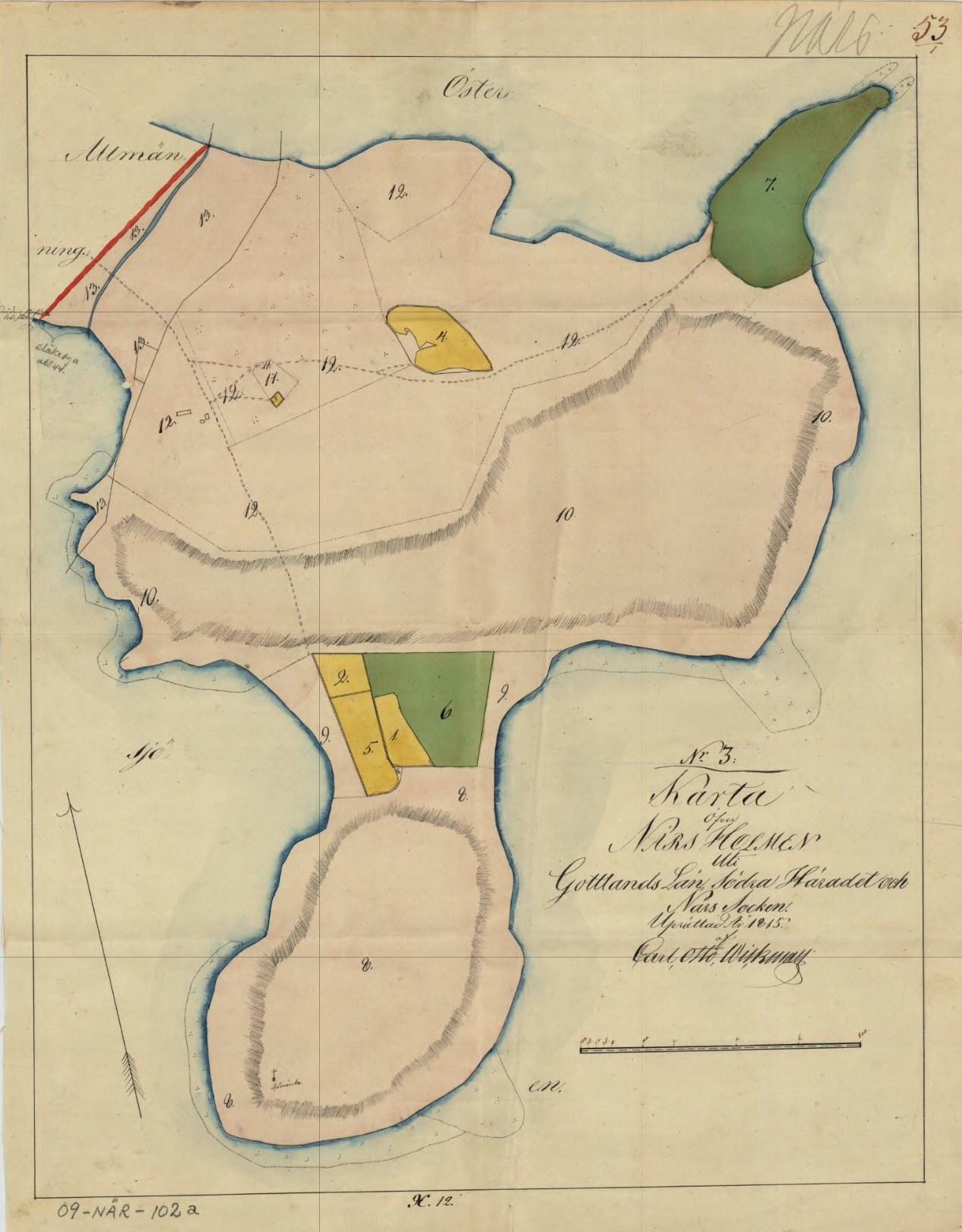
The Närsholmen peninsula in 1815
