= Anna Jansson =

Swedish writer and nurse

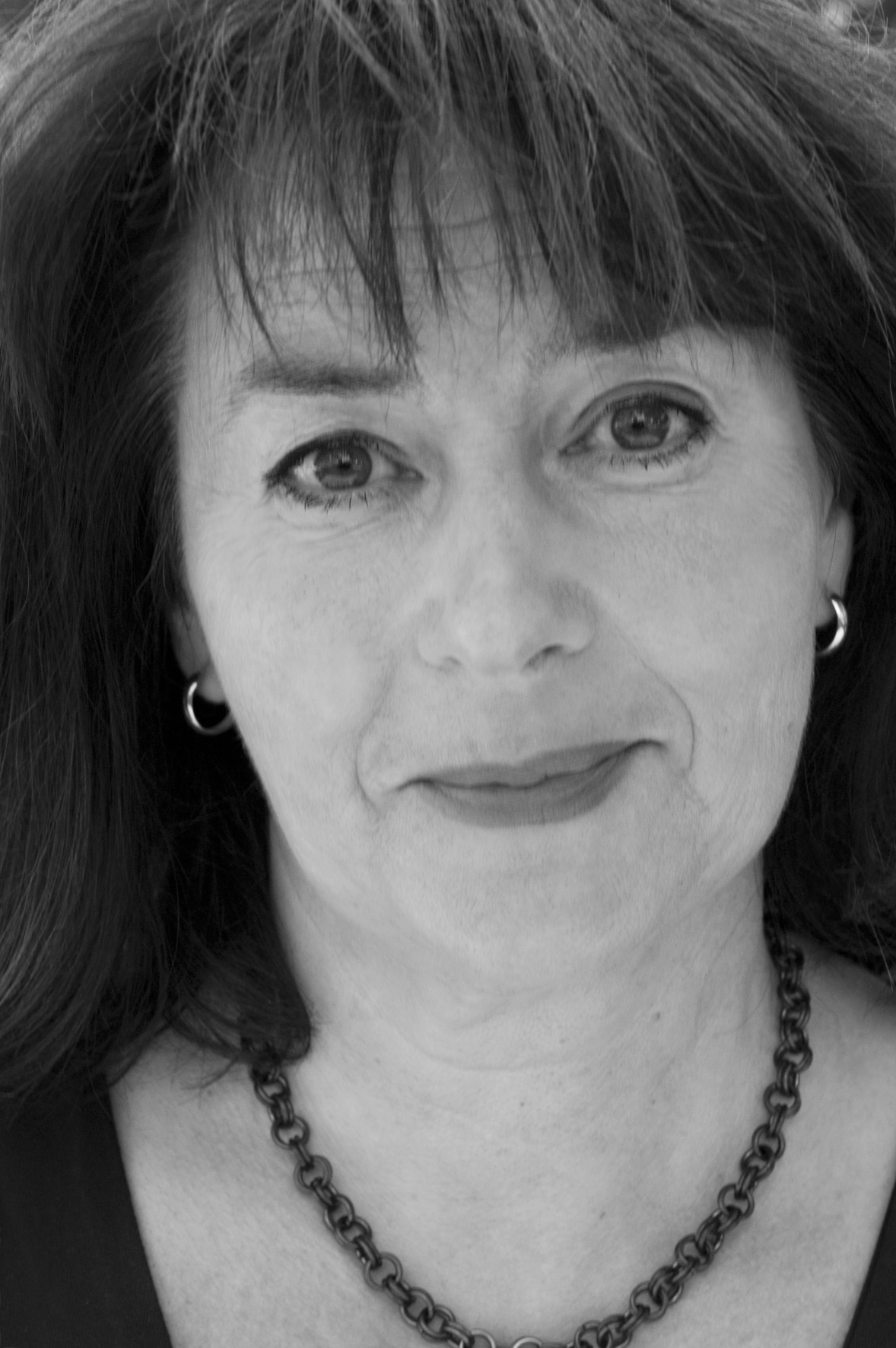
- Anna Jansson
- Born: 13 February 1958 (age 68); Visby, Gotland
- Occupations: Nurse, author
- Writing career
- Genres: Crime fiction, children's books

Anna Maria Angelika Jansson (born 13 February 1958) is a Swedish crime writer and nurse from Visby, Gotland. She started her career as a surgeon nurse, but soon went over to the lung clinic due to her frequent fainting from seeing blood.

Jansson began writing novels in 1997 after her family bought a computer. At this time she had worked as a nurse for twenty years, and although she still enjoyed her occupation, she felt it was time to try something new. Jansson commented: "In school I hated writing essays, but then we got a computer at home, and suddenly I discovered that I actually felt happy as I was writing." A contributing factor to Jansson's decision to pursue her career as an author was her patients; she often met patients that were about to die and she was told that they regretted the fact that they had not spent much time in life doing what they really wanted.

The inspiration for Jansson's novels, which deal with crimes, came from the patients she met in her job as a nurse. Jansson's first crime novel to be published was Stum sitter guden in 2000. She had written two novels prior to this one, but failed to find a publisher for them. Jansson did not give up on her career as a nurse, and continued to work part-time at the Örebro Hospital while writing in her free time. Since 2000, she has published at least one novel each year. Her latest ones have sold over 100,000 copies each. In addition to this, Jansson has written a number of children's books.

Jansson's crime novels take place in Gotland and the main character in all of them is criminal inspector Maria Wern. Her 2006 novel Främmande fågel was nominated for a Glass Key award in 2007, and was adapted into a television show by TV4 in 2008.

Despite her now successful career as a writer, Jansson still works part-time as a nurse at Örebro Hospital's lung clinic. She has three children and lives in Vintrosa outside of Örebro.

== Bibliography ==
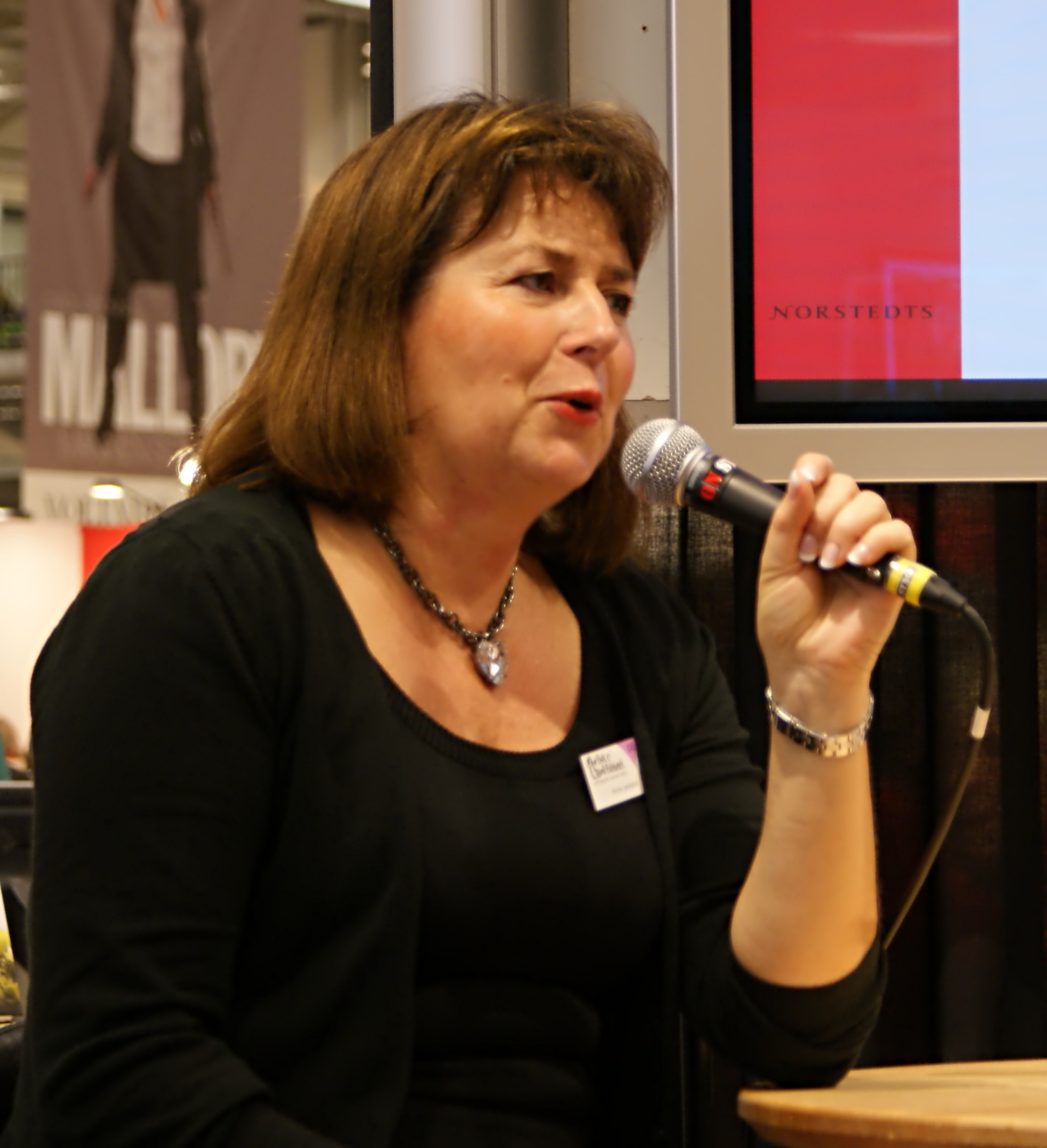
Anna Jansson at the 2008 Gothenburg Book Fair

=== Translated Crime novels ===
- 2013 – Strange Bird
- 2014 – Killer's Island

=== Audiobooks in English ===
- 01-24-25 - The Speechless God - audiobook
- 04-04-25 - All the Tranquil Dead - audiobook
- 04-04-25 - May Death Sleep - audiobook
- 04-04-25 - The Silver Crown - audiobook
- 04-04-25 - Dreams from Snow - audiobook
- 04-04-25 - Black Butterfly - audiobook
- 04-04-25 - Strange Bird - audiobook
- 04-04-25 - Boy Missing - audiobook
- 04-04-25 - Not Even the Past - audiobook
- 04-04-25 - Not Until the Giver Is Dead - audiobook

=== Crime novels ===
- 2000 – Stum sitter guden (The Speechless God)
- 2001 – Alla de stillsamma döda (All the Tranquil Dead)
- 2002 – Må döden sova (May Death Sleep)
- 2003 – Silverkronan (The Silver Crown)
- 2003 – Dömd för mord
- 2004 – Drömmar ur snö (Dreams of Snow)
- 2005 – Svart fjäril (Black Butterfly)
- 2006 – Främmande fågel (Strange Bird)
- 2007 – I stormen ska du dö
- 2007 – Pojke försvunnen (Boy Missing)
- 2008 – Inte ens det förflutna (Not Even the Past)
- 2008 – Hantverkarsvett är dyrare än saffran
- 2009 – Först när givaren är död (Not Until the Giver Is Dead)
- 2010 – Drömmen förde dej vilse (Killer's Island)
- 2011 – Alkemins eviga eld (The Eternal Flame of Alchemy)
- 2012 – När Skönheten kom till Bro (When Beauty Came to Town)
- 2013 – Dans på glödande kol (A Dance on Glowing Embers)
- 2014 – Skymningens barfotabarn (Child of the Shadows)
- 2014 – Ödesgudinnan på Salong d'Amour
- 2015 – Alla kan se dig (Everyone Can See You)
- 2016 – Rädslans fångar (Prisoners of Fear)
- 2017 - Det du inte vet (What You Do Not Know)
- 2018 - Kvinnan på bänken (Woman on the Bench)
- 2019 - Mitt hjärta är ditt (My Heart Is Yours)
- 2020 - Dödslistan (The Death List)
- 2021 - Galgbergets väktare (The Watchmen of Gallows Hill)
- 2022 - Onda drömmar (Bad Dreams)
- 2023 - Dödens snabba vingar (Swift Wings of Death)
- 2024 - Till offer åt de okända (Victims of the Unknown)
- 2025 - Rädslans labyrint (Labyrinth of Fear)

=== Children's books ===
- Ditt och mitt, 2007
- Ingen att vara med, 2007
- Modigt Mia, 2007
- Monster finns, 2007
- Kojan, 2007
- Mia frågar chans, 2007
- Det brinner, 2007
- En varulv, 2007
