= Urban Jürgensen =

Danish watchmaker

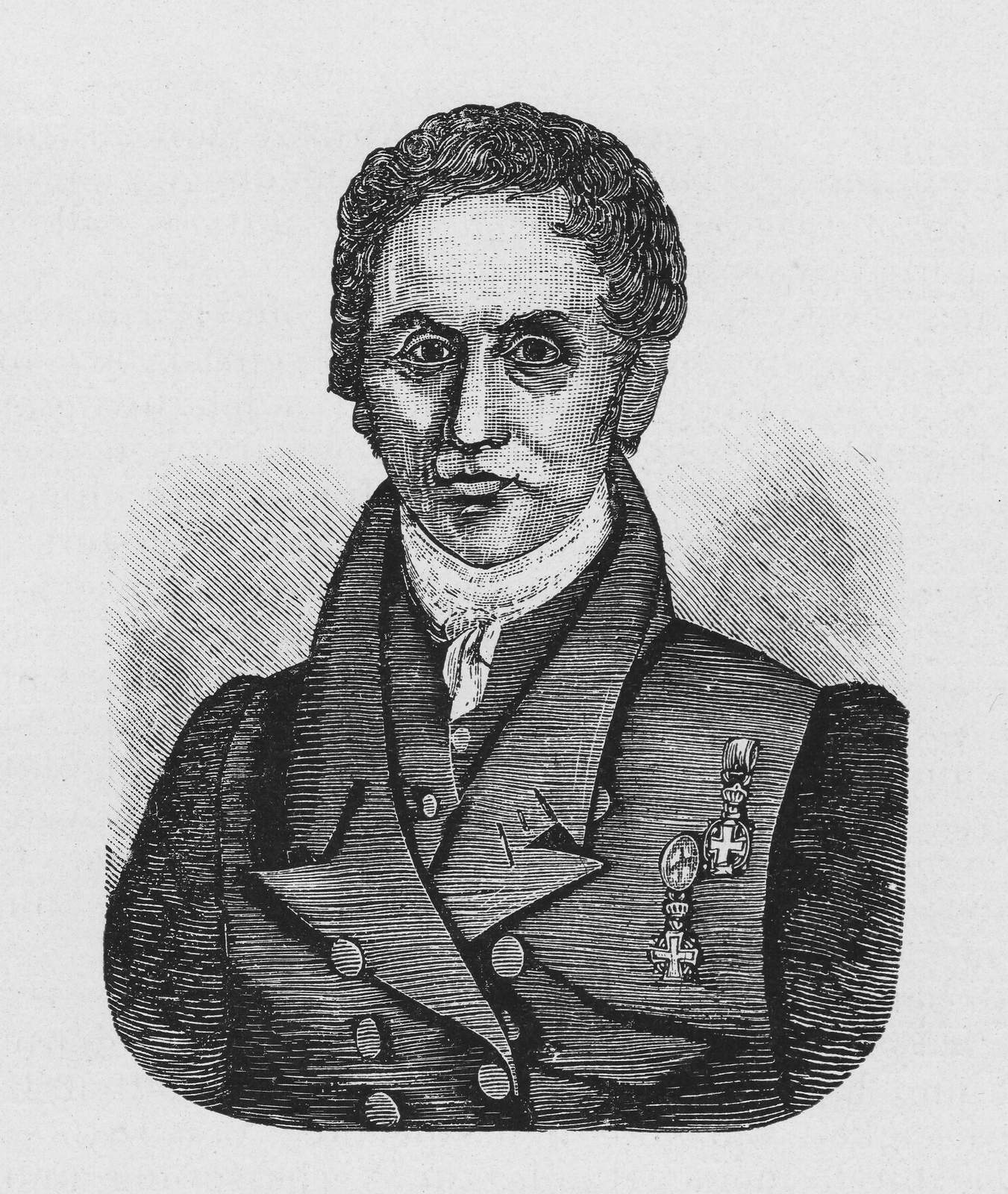
- Born: 5 August 1776; Copenhagen, Holstein
- Died: 14 May 1830 (aged 53); Copenhagen, Denmark
- Occupation: Watchmaker
- Awards: Decoration of the Dannebrogordenens Hæderstegn (1809) Knight of the Order of the Dannebrog (1824) The Royal Danish Academy Silver Medal (1804)

Urban Jürgensen (5 August 1776 – 14 May 1830) was a Danish watchmaker. The company bearing his name was originally founded by Urban's father in 1773. Urban Jürgensen's son Louis Urban Jürgensen took over the design and production after Urban's death under the name "Urban Jürgensen & Sønner", while the other son Jules Frederik Jürgensen went on to establish watch production in Switzerland. Founded in Copenhagen, the company later moved to Switzerland.

== Early life and education ==
Jürgensen was born on 5 August 1776 in Copenhagen, the son of royal watchmaker Jørgen Jørgensen (1745–1811) and Anne Leth Bruun (1755–1828). He attended Efterslægtens skole where his teachers included Edvard Storm and Knud Lyhne Rahbek. Jürgensen was in the same time a watchmaker's apprentice in his father's workshop. Aged 20, he went on a five-year journey abroad with economic support from Fonden ad usus publicos and Det Reiersenske Fond. He spent one and a half year in Neuchâtel and half a year in Switzerland before continuing to Paris where he studied under Abraham-Louis Breguet and Ferdinand Berthoud and then to London, apprenticing for John Arnold and John Brockbank. He then returned to Paris.

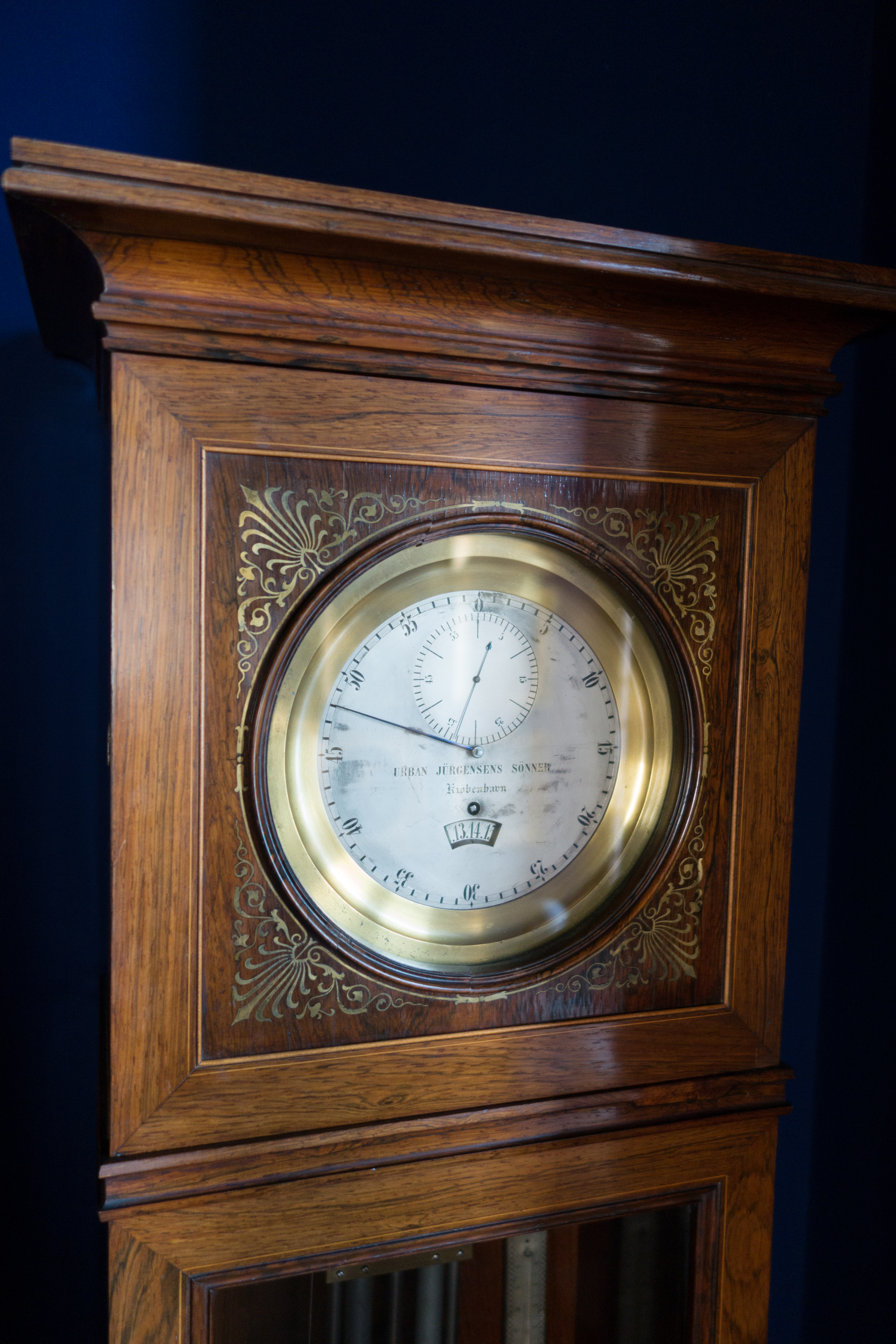
Urban Jürgensens Sönner regulator clock with jumping hours at Frederiksborg Castle.

== Career ==
Jürgensen returned to Copenhagen in 1801. He was supposed to enter into a partnership with a French watchmaker, Etienne Magnin, who had been called to Denmark to construct the next chronometers for the shipping industry. These plans changed when watchmaker continued to Saint Petersburg and Jürgensen then joined his father's workshop. In 1804, he published Regler for Tidens nøjagtige Afmaaling ved Uhre. It was the following year published in an improved edition in French. It was followed by a German translation. In 1804, he was also awarded the Academy of Sciences' silver medal for a publication about mainsprings published in one of its journals. In 1705, he was awarded Landhusholdningsselskabet's large gold medal for a metal thermometer. In 1807, weakened by gard work and personal griefs (the death of several children), he left Copenhagen for Neuchâtel where he stayed for two and a half years. He brought an extensive collection of machines and instruments back to Denmark which was the largest of its kind in the country. He was accompanied by a team of Swiss watchmakers which replaced his poorly trained Danish employees. In Geneva, he had been able to study the art of perforating precious stones, a technique which had for many years been kept secret. Jürgensen was also the first in Denmark to make cylindrical wheels in steel instead of brass.

Jürgensen continued the workshop alone after his father's death in 1811. Over a twenty-year period, he only manufactured around fifty chronometers.

In 1810, he was awarded the prestigious Order of the Dannebrog by King Frederik VI, recognizing his advancements in watchmaking. Furthermore, in 1815, he became the first watchmaker to be admitted to the Royal Danish Academy of Sciences and Letters.

== Personal life and legacy ==
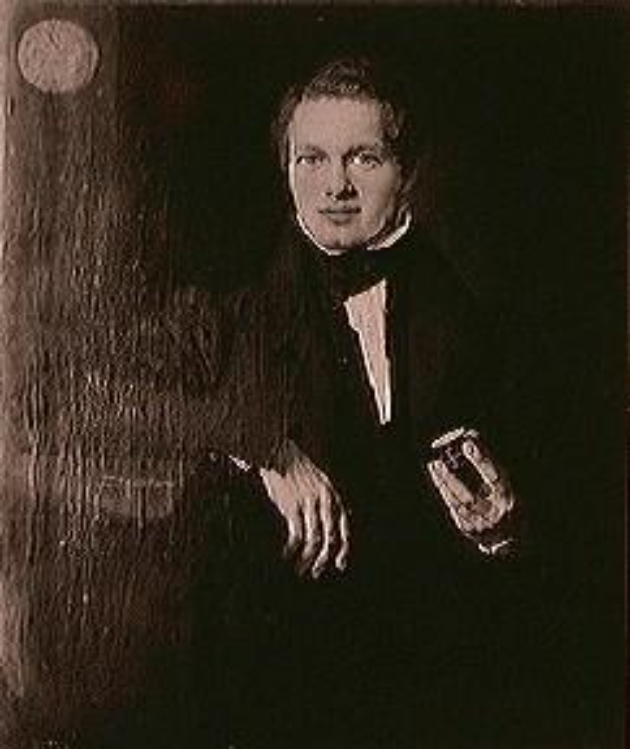
Louis Urban Jürgensen (1806-1867)

He was engaged to Sophie Henriette (31 January 1780, Locle - 24 January 1852, Copenhagen) in Neuchâtel, and they were married on 12 May 1801 in Peseux. She was a daughter of watchmaker Jacques Frédéric Houriet (1743–1830) and Henriette Courvoisier (1753–88). Urban Jürgensen's brother was adventurer Jørgen Jørgensen.

He died on 14 May 1830 and is buried at the French Reformed Church in Copenhagen.

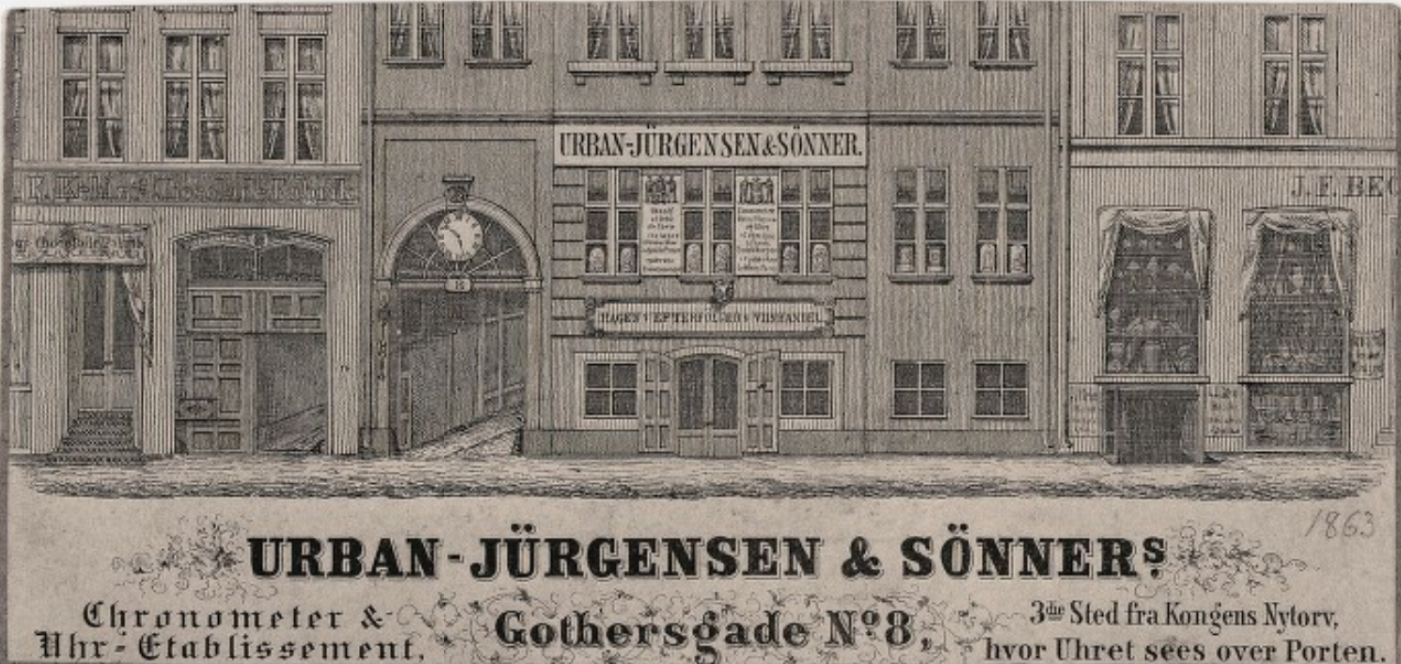
The Urban Jürgensen shop in Gothersgade in Copenhagen 1863

Jürgensen's two sons, Jules-Frederik Jürgensen and Louis Urban Jürgensen, continued the family tradition: Jules studied in Switzerland and subsequently went on to establish his own workshop that later developed to the watch company Jules Jürgensen, while his brother Louis remained in charge of the workshop in Copenhagen operating under the name "Urban Jürgensen & Sønner". Victor Kullberg, who went on to be one of London's most famous clockmakers, worked for Louis in the late 1840s.

In 2021, the Rosenfield family, led by Andrew M. Rosenfield -- a leading independent watch collector and the President of Guggenheim Partners -- purchased Urban Jürgensen. They tapped Finnish watchmaker Kari Voutilainen to serve as Co-CEO alongside Alex Rosenfield.

The revival has been covered in detail by horological publications, which outlined the continuity between historical craftsmanship and the new leadership's ambitions for long-form independent watchmaking.

== Reception and Modern Commentary ==
In recent years, the legacy of Urban Jürgensen has been the subject of renewed attention. In a 2025 article for Revolution Watch, horological journalist Cheryl Chia outlines three defining eras of the brand — its Enlightenment-era origins under Urban Jürgensen, the 20th-century revival by Peter Baumberger and Derek Pratt, and its modern stewardship under the Rosenfield family and Kari Voutilainen. The article emphasizes the brand’s consistent pursuit of chronometric excellence and traditional artisanal techniques.
