= Othem Church =

- Othems kyrka
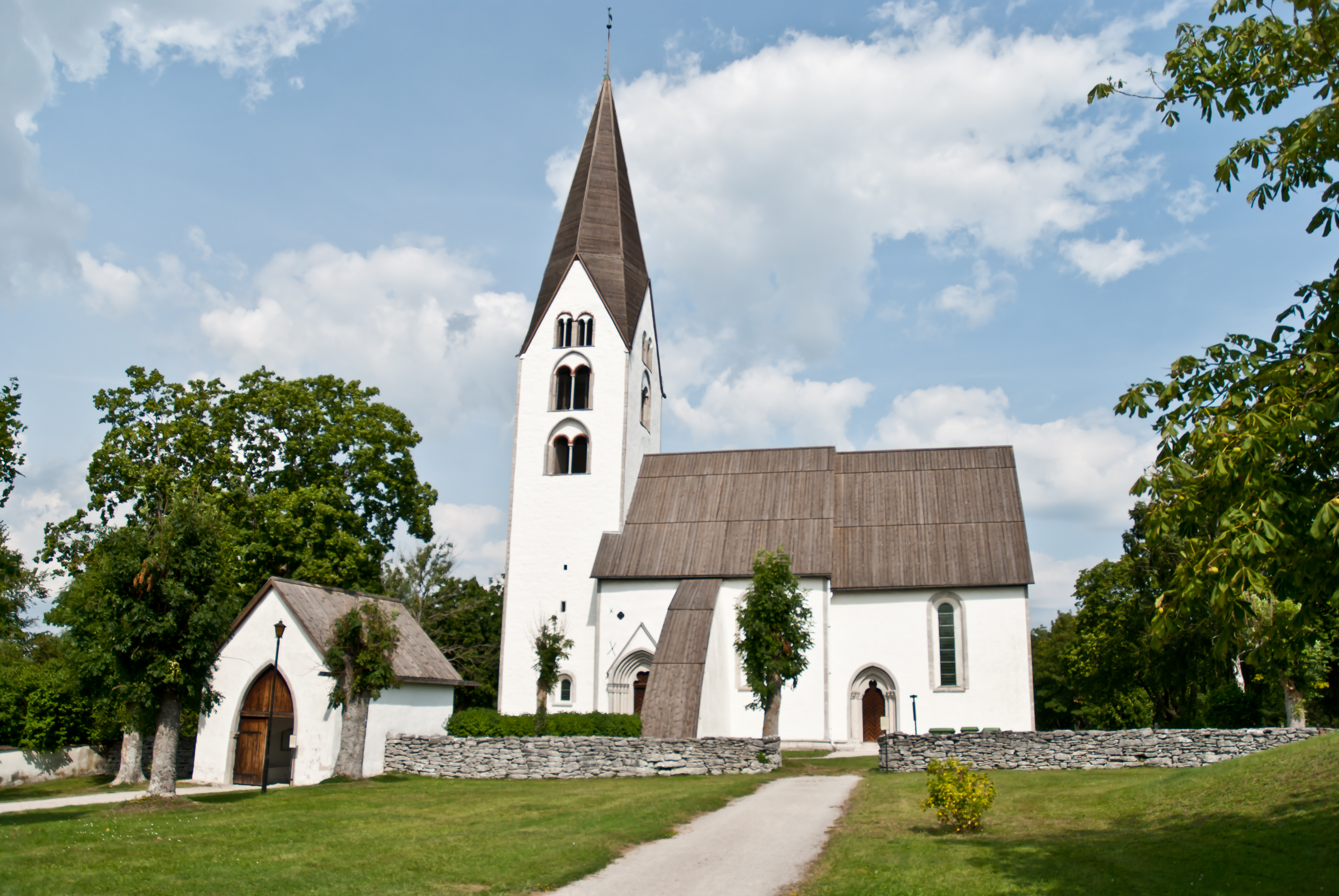
- Othem Church

- Location on Gotland
- 57°44′50″N 18°44′19″E
- Country: Sweden
- Denomination: Church of Sweden

Administration
- Diocese: Visby

Othem Church (Swedish: Othems kyrka) is a medieval church in Othem on Gotland, Sweden. It was built in the 13th century and contains several medieval murals.

== History ==
The presently visible church in Othem was built in the 13th century, and replaced an earlier stone church in the same location. This earlier church was probably built in the late 12th century. A few elements from this church have been preserved and incorporated into the presently visible building, notably a now closed Romanesque portal in the north wall of the nave. The lower part of the tower was built while this earlier church still existed, during the first half of the 13th century. The nave and chancel were then replaced with the presently visible structure, and lastly the tower was finished. In 1882, the sacristy was built. At the same time, the south windows of both the nave and chancel were altered somewhat. A restoration of the church was undertaken in 1952.

== Architecture, murals and furnishings ==
Othem Church is built in a rather plain Gothic style. The two south portals are very similar, decorated with sculpted floral ornaments. The Romanesque north portal is undecorated. The nave is almost square, and its four bays are supported by a central pillar. Its decorated capital is similar in style to the capital of the pillar supporting the vaults in Hellvi Church, also on Gotland. The church contains several medieval murals. They were covered with whitewash in 1693 but rediscovered and restored in 1909. The oldest of the murals are from the middle of the 13th century and decorate the chancel vault. The easternmost is the most well-preserved, and also displays an uncommon subject among Swedish medieval church murals: the tree of life, threatened by hunters with bows and a dragon. The chancel arch is furthermore decorated with an early 14th-century painting of Mary with the Christ. Around the chancel runs another set of murals, depicting Christ, the apostles and Saint Denis, who may have been the patron saint of the church during the Middle Ages. It was painted in the 15th century.

The oldest item in the church is the very worn baptismal font, made in the late 12th century by the Romanesque sculptor known as Sigraf. It was probably made for the earlier church on the same site. Inset in the church floor in the chancel are also some medieval tombstones, two of which are inscribed with runes. The altarpiece is made of sandstone in 1693, and depicts the crucifixion. The pulpit is from the 1730s and the pews are probably about a decade younger. The facade of the church organ is from 1854, but the current organ was installed behind it in 1984.

== Sources cited ==
- Jacobsson, Britta; Johansson, Eva; Johansson, Per; Andersson, Rolf (1990). Våra kyrkor [Our churches]. Västervik: Klarkullens förlag AB. ISBN 91-971561-08.
- Lagerlöf, Erland; Svahnström, Gunnar (1991). Gotlands kyrkor [Churches of Gotland] (in Swedish) (4th ed.). Stockholm: Rabén & Sjögren. ISBN 91-29-61598-4.
