= Miles Howard-Wilks =

Australian artist (born 1979)

Miles Howard-Wilks (born in Melbourne, 1979) is an Australian artist. While working primarily as a painter, Howard-Wilks is also a ceramicist and animator and has worked in the Arts Project Australia studio since 2000. His diverse subject matter explores themes such as the Australian landscape, seascapes, and Australian Rules Football. With a fine attention to detail and a special interest in oceanic and environmental imagery, Howard-Wilks' works have been widely exhibited both Australia-wide and internationally. His works are held within many collections, most notably at the National Gallery of Australia and the Museum of Contemporary Art. He is viewed as an important figure in outsider art in Australia.

== Early life and education ==
Howard-Wilks was encouraged in artistic pursuits by his mother, also an artist, from a young age. However, it wasn't until he attended Churinga at the age of 20 where he began working with the artist-in-residence there that he started to make art seriously. Following this time Howard-Wilks studied art at TAFE and, at the age of 22, began attending Arts Project Australia. While Howard-Wilks has received no formal fine art training, the artist's participation at Arts Project Australia's studio program has seen Howard-Wilks develop his very singular style.

== Career, themes and style ==
Howard-Wilks works independently, often painting from memory. His subject matter reflects his personal interests and often depicts the Australian landscape, Australian Rules Football, marine life and trains. Howard-Wilks’ paintings are often characterised by the construction of unique perspectives and compositions, which emphasizes the spatial vastness of the sky and clouds. Rather than producing realist depictions, Howard-Wilks’ imagery combines his acute observations with his use of reference material. As the environmental arts organisation CLIMARTE has noted, Howard-Wilks "is dedicated to exploring themes such as Australian landscapes, seascapes, the environment, football and more specifically, sharks, magpies and trains." This echoes the sentiments of journalist Julia Irwin, who states that "The inspiration for his [Howard-Wilks'] detailed gouache painting stems from his diverse interests including Australian animals and plants, trains and his favourite football team — Collingwood." Howard-Wilks' practice is also meticulously detailed in its unity of seemingly disparate references. This ability, as art critic Dan Rule writes, "creates wild hyper-natural scenes awash with giant crocodiles, sharks and an ever-present magpie, each of which shift in scale, prominence and perspective."

Continuing Howard-Wilks ongoing interest in environmental issues and climate change, in 2016 the painter collaborated with esteemed artist Jon Campbell for the CLIMARTE 2016 Poster Project. The pair produced a work based upon the environmental degradation of the Great Barrier Reef which was praised for its ability to "encourage people to think about the damage we are doing to the reef's fragile ecosystems." Environmental and oceanic themes pervade Howard-Wilks' work, "illustrating his concerns for marine environments."

As Howard-Wilks' career has developed, so has the commitment Howard-Wilks shows to his work, which is evident in the development of his animated films produced since 2004. Howard-Wilks' video works have been screened at events such as the 2004 Disability Film Festival (as part of the British Film Institute) and the Annual Westgarth Film Festival in Melbourne. With inclusion in numerous group exhibitions, Howard-Wilks has held two solo exhibitions at Arts Project Australia and Melbourne's West Space. In a testament to Howard-Wilks' ever-expanding career and practice, the artist's work is now held in several collections with two works notably within the collection of the National Gallery of Australia

== Solo exhibitions ==
2015

My solo with a magpie in it, West Space, Melbourne

2004

Sharks and Everything, Arts Project Australia Gallery, Melbourne

== Group exhibitions ==
2016

Clay: it's a matter of substance, Arts Project Australia, Melbourne

A History of the Future; Imagining Melbourne, City Gallery, Melbourne Town Hall, Melbourne

Climarte Poster Project, LAB-14 Gallery, Carlton Connect Initiative,

University of Melbourne

2015

Somewhere in the city, Arts Project Australia Gallery, Melbourne

Altered Vistas, Arts Project Australia Gallery, Melbourne

2014

CCP Salon, Centre for Contemporary Photography, Fitzroy

Sit Down, Shut Up and Watch, Film & New Media Festival, South Australia

Connected, Yarra Gallery, Federation Square, Melbourne

Small Universe, No Vacancy, QV Melbourne

2012

Walsh Bay Arts Table, The Wharf – Pier 2, Sydney NSW

Melbourne Art Fair, Royal Exhibition Building, Melbourne

2011

Exhibition #4, Museum of Everything, London

2010

Pacifica, Gallery Impaire, Paris, France

We Call Them Pirates Out Here: MCA Collection, Museum of Contemporary Art, Sydney

Myscape, Trongate & Collins Gallery, Strathclyde University, Glasgow, Scotland

2009

Pearls of Arts Project Australia: The Stuart Purves Collection, Orange Regional Gallery, NSW

2008

Without Borders: Outsider Art in an Antipodean Context, Monash University Museum of Art, Melbourne

2007

Otherworlds, King Street Gallery on Burton, Sydney

2005

Leo Cussen with Selected Artists, Australian Galleries, Collingwood

2003

Home Sweet Home: works from the Peter Fay collection, National Gallery of Australia, Canberra (travelling exhibition)

== Publications ==
Anne Stonehouse and James McDonald, Paul Hodges in So Far… Eight Artists/Eight Stories, Arts Project Australia Inc., 2014, pp. 24–39.

== Collections ==
Miles Howard-Wilks is represented in the public collections of City of Melbourne, the Stuart Purves Collection, the National Gallery of Australia and the Museum of Contemporary Art (Sydney); the later as gifted by Henry Ergas. His work is also held in private collections.
