= Patrick Francis =

Australian artist, athlete and author

Patrick Francis (born 1991) is an Australian artist, athlete, and author. He is best known for his colourful depictions of contemporary Melbourne life and as the co-founder (with sister Lesley Francis) of Absolutely Awetistic Arts. His work is held in the collections of the Art Gallery of NSW and Artbank, and has been included in major exhibitions. He has been a studio artist at Arts Project Australia since 2009.

== Early life and education ==
Francis was born in 1991. He has autism and limited speech, began painting as a child, alongside his older sister Lesley Francis.

He later studied at Brunswick Special Development School, where he had the opportunity to first participate in exhibitions and competitions in 2005. Shortly after leaving the school he and his sister co-founded Awetistic Arts, an organisation which "promotes disability awareness and talent in the arts". In the same year, Francis began exhibiting his work with Arts Project Australia, where he held his first solo show in 2014.

== Career, themes and style ==
In addition to co-founding Absolutely Awetistic Arts, Patrick and Lesley Francis have collaborated on a number of publications, in which text and poetry authored by Lesley accompany illustrations by Patrick. His artwork and community development projects have been multi-awarded.

A prolific painter, Francis works primarily with acrylic on paper using bold, dynamic sections of bold colour. The imagery in his paintings draws from the aspects of contemporary Melbourne life, popular culture, and art history, and has been informed by Australian painters such as Sidney Nolan. In 2016 the Sydney Morning Herald noted Francis—alongside fellow Arts Project studio artists Julian Martin, Terry Williams and Alan Constable—for having achieved "significant mainstream success, well beyond the realm of what is normally deemed outsider art."

In 2013 Francis, work was selected for the major exhibition of contemporary art Melbourne Now at the National Gallery of Victoria. He has exhibited internationally in India, Singapore and Bangkok.

== Recognition ==
In 2012 Francis was the recipient of the prestigious Credit Suisse Private Banking Contemporary Art Award.

In 2014 he won a Victorian Young Achiever Award.

In 2016 he won the A1 Darebin Art Salon, which resulted in a major showcase of his work at the Bundoora Homestead Art Centre in 2017.

He is also a successful sportsman who has won medals in both swimming and bowling at national level.

== Collections ==
His work has been acquired for the collections of the Art Gallery of New South Wales and Artbank.
