= Anne Lynch =

Ann(e) Lynch may refer to:

- Ann Lynch (politician) (born 1964), American politician
- Ann Lynch (archaeologist), Irish archaeologist
- Anne Lynch Botta (1815–1891), American poet, writer, teacher and socialite
- Anne Lynch (artist) (born 1956), Australian artist
