= Chris Mason =

Chris Mason may refer to:

- Chris Mason (actor), (born 1991), English actor
- Chris Mason (artist) (born 1976), Australian artist
- Chris Mason (darts player) (born 1969), English darts player
- Chris Mason (footballer) (born 1986), English footballer
- Chris Mason (ice hockey) (born 1976), Canadian ice hockey player
- Chris Mason (journalist) (born 1980), English journalist
- Chris Mason (musician), American musician
- Chris Mason (runner), winner of the 1969 distance medley relay at the NCAA Division I Indoor Track and Field Championships

== See also ==
- Christopher Mason (disambiguation)
