= Alan Constable =

Australian artist (born 1956)

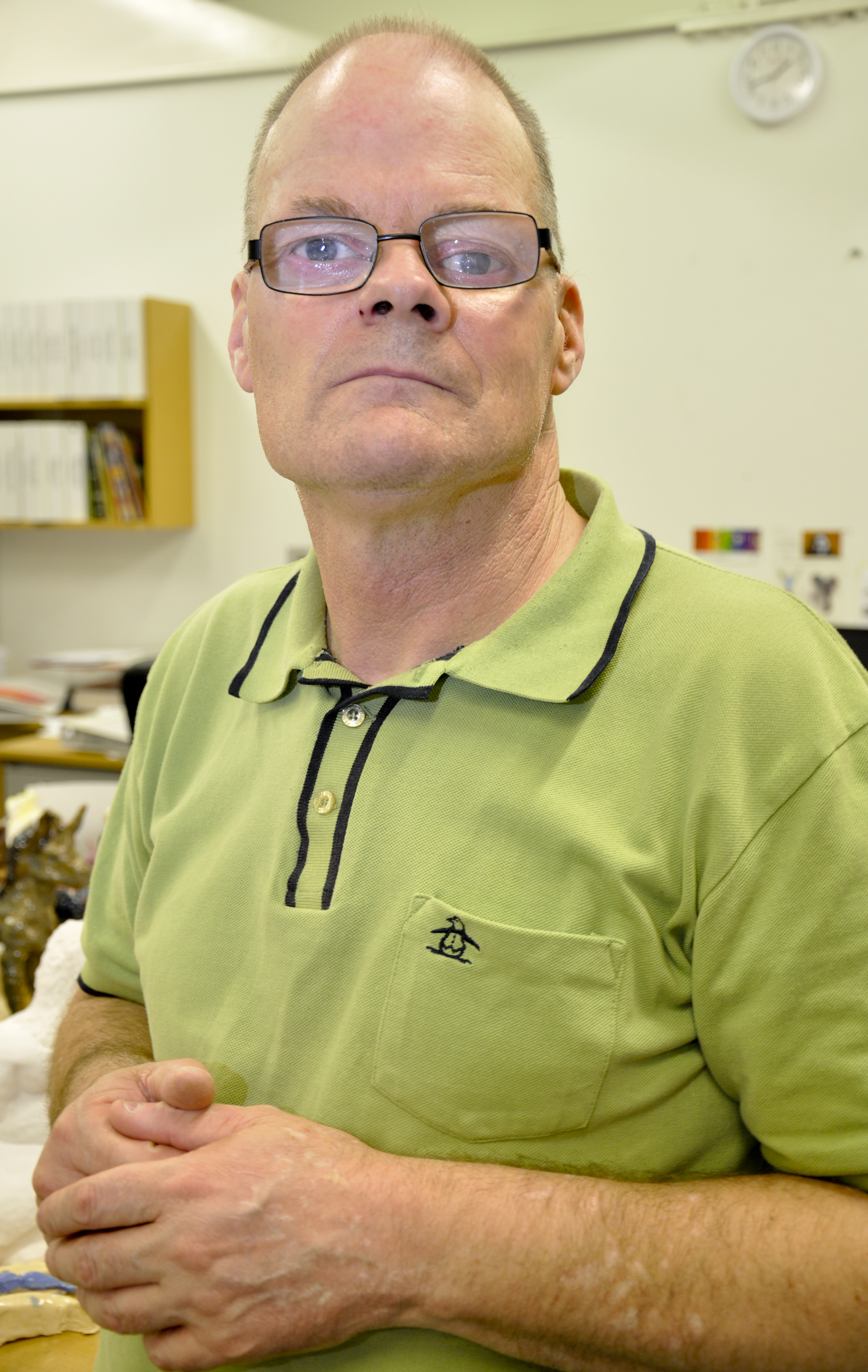
Artist Alan Constable.

Alan Constable (born 1956) is an Australian artist known for his ceramic sculptural depictions of photographic cameras. Constable has worked principally from his Northcote-based studio at Arts Project Australia since 1991, gaining critical success as a multi-disciplinary artist proficient in a wide diversity of media including pastel, gouache, paint and ceramics. He has been working on his series of ceramic cameras since 2007 and works from this series were represented at the 2009 Australian Ceramic Triennale in Sydney and featured in a solo exhibition of his work, Clay Cameras, at the Centre for Contemporary Photography in Melbourne. Thirteen works from this series were acquired for the collection of the National Gallery of Victoria in 2014, and appeared in their blockbuster exhibition of contemporary art, Melbourne Now, in the same year.

== Early life and education ==
Constable was born in Melbourne. His "fascination with light and love of cameras" began at the age of eight, when he would construct intricate replicas of cameras, made from cereal cartons and glue. As artist Peter Atkins states, this early "interest in cameras – objects that are totally reliant on vision to find, frame and capture an image – is not without irony," due to the fact that Constable is both legally blind and deaf. He participated in his first group exhibition in 1987 at St Martin's Theatre Gallery in South Yarra, Melbourne and shortly thereafter he began regularly working at Arts Project Australia (APA), an organisation devoted to supporting and promoting artists with an intellectual disability. Although Constable received no formal training, his participation in the studio program at APA gave him access to fine art materials and the informal tuition provided by the practicing artists employed by the organisation. Following the commencement of his work at APA he began exhibiting regularly in Australia and participated in his first international group exhibitions in 1995, in the US and Belgium.

== Career, themes and style ==
Both Constable's lack of formal training and disability has identified him as one of the key figures within the Outsider Art category in Australia. This categorisation is confirmed by his repeated inclusion in Outsider Art exhibitions and fairs, both in Australia and in the USA [see Exhibitions]. However, in recent years his work has also achieved critical success in the wider sphere of the Australian contemporary art institution and his first solo exhibition occurred at Helen Gory Galerie, a commercial art gallery located in Melbourne, in 2009. This exhibition was quickly followed by his inclusion in the Melbourne Now exhibition at the National Gallery of Victoria in 2014, a solo exhibition in Los Angeles curated by the artist Ricky Swallow in 2013 and his inclusion an exhibition curated by the Museum of Everything at the Kunsthal, Rotterdam, in 2016.

A multi-disciplinary artist, Constable's drawings and paintings are typically depictions of landscapes, solitary figures and animals, which are sourced from expired books and magazines, such as National Geographic. His style for both his two dimensional and ceramic works has been attributed to the way in which he utilises his extremely limited sight to focus on a singular aspect of a scene or subject. This stylistic focus, the selection of his subject matter and the tactile nature of his works (which often feature the imprint of the artist's fingers on the clay surface) imply a close personal relationship between the artist and the works; as David Hurlston, Curator of Australian Art at the NGV, notes, the ceramic cameras "become a very personal and touching tribute. [They] contain traces of humanity." His work has been compared that of Claes Oldenburg, in that both artists transform utilitarian objects by "altering scale and exploiting differences in materials" and former NGV curator Alex Baker has compared his work to that of Philip Guston, stating that "if Philip Guston was a ceramicist, these are the kind of objects he would make."

== Solo exhibitions ==
Alan Constable: Close –Up, Andrew Baker Art Dealer, Brisbane, 2015

Alan Constable, Darren Knight Gallery, Sydney, 2015

Alan Constable/Ten Cameras, Curated by Ricky Swallow, South Willard, Los Angeles, 2013

Viewfinder: Alan Constable Survey, Arts Project Australia Gallery, Melbourne, 2011

Constable, Stills Gallery, Paddington, Sydney, New South Wales, 2011

Alan Constable Clay Cameras, Helen Gory Galerie, Melbourne, 2009

== Selected group exhibitions ==
Linden Postcard Show, Linden New Art Gallery, St Kilda, Victoria 2025

Gold Coast International Ceramic Art Award, Gold Coast City Gallery, Gold Coast, 2016

Clay: it's a matter of substance, Arts Project Australia Gallery, Melbourne, 2016

Museum of Everything, Kunsthal Rotterdam, 2016

Tell 'em I'm dead, Arts Project Australia Gallery, Melbourne, 2016

It takes more than 140 characters to write a novel, Arts Project Australia Gallery, Melbourne, 2015

Victorian Craft Award, Craft, Melbourne, 2015

Polaroid Project, Horsham Regional Art Gallery, Horsham, 2014

Deakin University Contemporary Small Sculpture Award, Deakin University Art Gallery, Melbourne, 2014

Melbourne Art Fair 2014, Royal Exhibition Building, Melbourne (1994 – 2014)

Renegades: Outsider Art, Moree Plains Gallery, NSW, 2014

Into the Vault and Out of the Box, Arts Project Australia Gallery, Melbourne, 2014

Renegades: Outsider Art, The Arts Centre Gold Coast, Queensland, 2014

Melbourne Now, National Gallery of Victoria, 2014

Chicago Expo: Fleisher/Ollman Gallery, Chicago, USA, 2013

Nocturne, Arts Project Australia Gallery, Melbourne, 2013

Manningham Victorian Ceramic Art Award, Manningham Art Gallery, 2013

Outsiderism, Fleisher/Ollman Gallery, Philadelphia, 2013

Error and Judgement, Arts Project Australia Gallery Melbourne, 2012

Exhibition #4, Museum of Everything, London, 2011

The Shilo Project, national exhibition, 2009 - 2011

This Sensual World, Arts Project Australia Gallery, Melbourne, 2011

National Gallery of Victoria 150th event, Melbourne, 2011

Human Nature, Alan Lane Community Gallery: Warrnambool Art Gallery, 2011

Hobart Art Prize, Tasmanian Museum and Art Gallery, Hobart, 2010

Pacifica, Gallery Impaire, Paris, France, 2010

Snapshot, ACGA Gallery, Federation Square, Melbourne, 2009

Off the Edge: Ceramics Triennale, Chrissie Cotter Gallery, Sydney, 2009

BloodLines: Art and the Horse, QUT Art Museum, Brisbane, 2009

Alan Constable & Julian Martin, Australian Galleries, Melbourne, 2009

Clay Cameras, Centre for Contemporary Photography, (CCP) Melbourne, 2009

17th Annual Outsider Art Fair, The Mart, New York, 2009

Short Stories, Tall Tales and the Way They Wore Them, Arts Project Australia Gallery, Melbourne, 2008

Pearls of Arts Project Australia: The Stuart Purves Collection, Ivan Dougherty Gallery, College of Fine Arts, UNSW Sydney, 2008

The Dinner Party, Arts Project Australia Gallery, Melbourne, 2007

Private and Confidential, Arts Project Australia Gallery, Melbourne, 2007

Double Take, Arts Project Australia Gallery, Melbourne, 2005

A Sense of Place, Arts Project Australia Gallery, Melbourne, 2003

Face Up, Idiom Studio, New Zealand, 2002

Arterial - artists from Arts Project Australia, Paralympic Arts Festival, Sydney Opera House, 2000

2000 National Works on Paper, Mornington Peninsula Regional Gallery, 2000

Works on Paper, Australian Galleries, Sydney, 1999

Connexions Particulières, MADMusée and Musée d'Art Moderne et d'Art Contemporain, Liège, Belgium, 1999

Nine Artists from Arts Project Australia, Australian Galleries, Melbourne, 1999

The Inner View, Arts Project Australia Gallery, Melbourne, 1999

Prints & Artists' Books, Arts Project Australia, Melbourne, 1997

Border Crossing, McClelland Regional Gallery, Langwarrin, 1996

Wild Things, Arts Project Australia, Melbourne, 1996

Reversed Image, Arts Project Australia Gallery, Melbourne, 1995

MADMusée, Liège, Belgium, 1995

Vita Gallery, Portland, Oregon, USA, 1995

Beyond Words, National Gallery of Victoria, 1994

International Works on Paper Fair, Powerhouse Museum, Sydney, 1993

Gone to PAC, National Gallery of Victoria, 1993

Inside Out/Outside In, National Gallery of Victoria, 1992

Arts Project, 200 Gertrude Street, Melbourne, 1991

== Publications ==
Alan Constable: Viewfinder, exhibition catalogue, Arts Project Australia, Melbourne, 2015. ISBN 9780958665964

== Collections ==
Gold Coast City Gallery, AUS

City of Melbourne, AUS

Deakin University, AUS

National Gallery of Victoria, AUS

The Museum of Everything, UK

Broken Hill Regional Gallery Collection, AUS

Orange Regional Gallery, AUS

Manningham Art Gallery, AUS
