= Arts Project Australia =

Non-profit organisation based in Australia

- Formation: 1974
- Founder: Myra Hilgendorf OAM
- Type: Charity and non-profit organisation
- Purpose: Provides facilitation/mentoring, studio and exhibition spaces for artists with intellectual disabilities
- Location: Northcote, Victoria, Australia

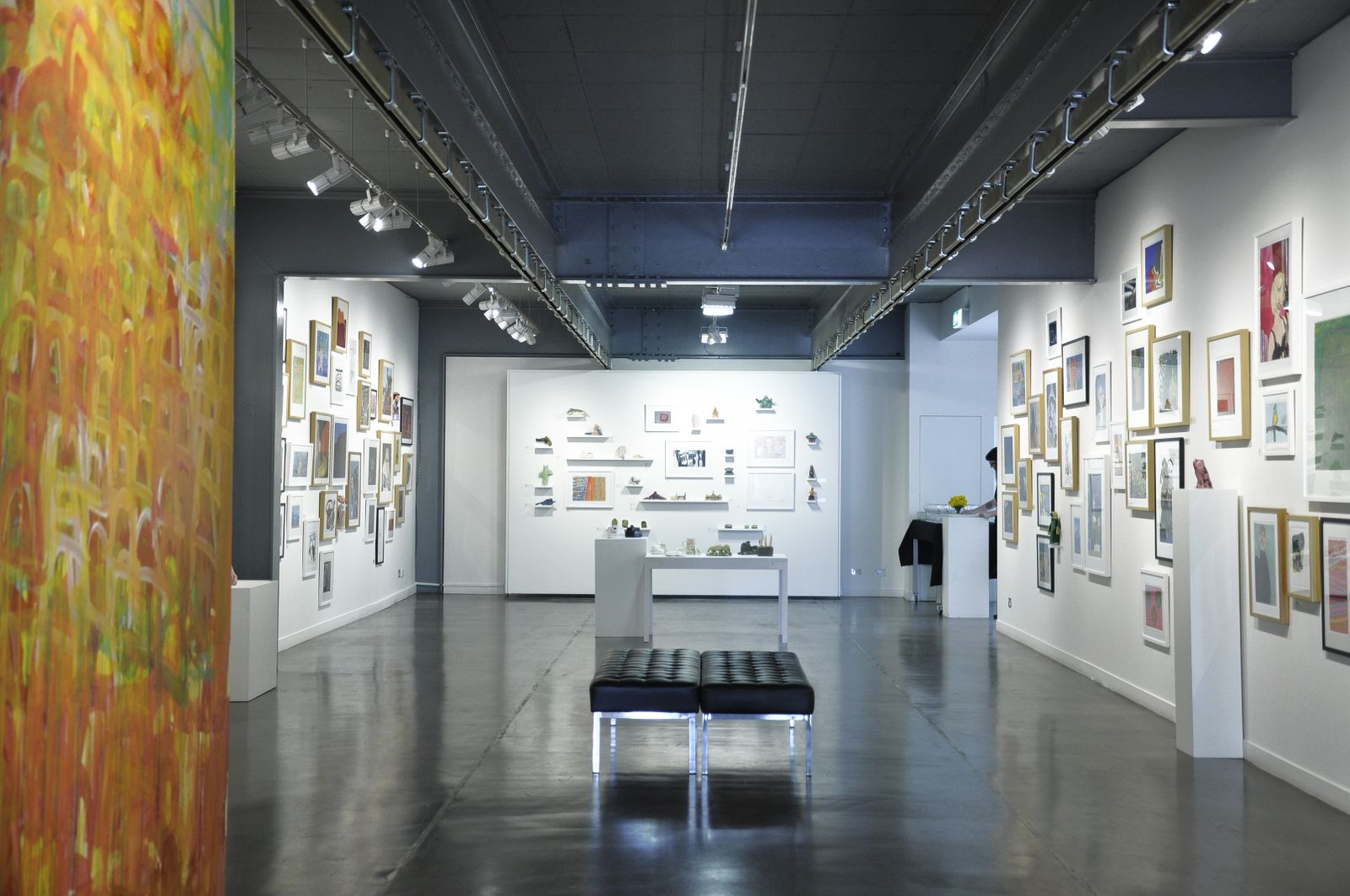
Arts Project Australia

Arts Project Australia Inc. is a registered charity and non-profit organisation located in Northcote, an inner northern area of Melbourne, Victoria, Australia. The organisation provides facilitation/mentoring, studio and exhibition spaces for artists with intellectual disabilities, and as such has been identified as a major centre for the promotion and exhibition of outsider art, or art that has been produced outside of the contemporary and historical mainstream. In 2016 there were approximately 130 artists attending the studio, with the work of exhibiting artists featuring alongside works from the broader contemporary art community in the annual rotating exhibition program.

== History ==
Arts Project was founded in 1974 by Myra Hilgendorf OAM and was the first full-time not-for-profit art studio in Australia for artists with intellectual disabilities. Hilgendorf sought to provide the opportunity for artists with intellectual disabilities to access the same resources, materials and opportunities to exhibit, as non-disabled artists. The seminal exhibition Minus/Plus was launched in 1975, the title working as a counter response to the negative implications of a series of articles printed in The Age newspaper, entitled ‘The Minus Children.’ This was followed in 1980 by the exhibition Tommy's World, which opened at the Australian National Gallery in Canberra.

In 2004, APA moved to its current premises where it is governed by a volunteer board and operates via funding attained from government grants, the sale of artwork, donations and bequests from private groups and individuals, as well as grants from philanthropic trusts and foundations.

In recent years, a greater interest in contemporary Outsider art, as evidenced by Massimiliano Gioni's 2013 Venice Biennale which included several exhibits dedicated to self-taught or Outsider artists, has led to an increase in the media exposure and significance attributed to organisations such as Arts Project Australia. In 2013 three artists represented by APA, Boris Cipusev, Alan Constable and Patrick Francis, were featured in the Melbourne Now exhibition at the National Gallery of Victoria, which also acquired a collection of work by Cipusev and Constable for its permanent collection.

In 2014, APA partnered with Melbourne University to host the international conference Contemporary Outsider Art: The Global Context. The conference coincided with several outsider art exhibitions at major institutions in Australia, including Albert Tucker and the Mystery of HD at Heide Museum of Modern Art and exhibitions at the Dax Centre and the Social Studio. In 2016 APA received the Award for Outstanding Organisation, in the HESTA Community Sector Awards.

Notable curators and artists who have produced exhibitions at APA include Philadelphia-based curator Alex Baker (former Curator for International Art at the National Gallery of Victoria), Ricky Swallow, Karra Rees (Centre for Contemporary Photography), Vincent Alessi (Ian Potter Museum of Art), Emma Busowsky Cox (Castlemaine Art Museum), Richard Lewer, Linda Judge, Jim Pavlidis, Angela Cavalieri, Paul Hodges, Katherine Hattam and Judy Holding. Additional significant figures from Australian public life who have collaborated in APA artistic projects include Michael Caton, John Clarke, Fiona Corke, Abi Crompton, Brian Dawe, Mick Harvey, John-Michael Howson OAM, Lukas Markovic and Thérèse Rein.

APA has collaborated to produce exhibitions at a number of major Australian institutions, most recently for the Centre for Contemporary Photography (Clay Cameras, 2009), Australian Centre for the Moving Image (Outsider Art Shorts, 2014), Ian Potter Museum of Art (Everyday Imaginings: new perspectives on Outsider Art, 2014), Melbourne Theatre Company (The Sublime 2014, Endgame 2015), Art + Climate = Change (Altered Vistas, 2015), Art Centre Melbourne (Home, 2015), Linden New Art (Wild Lands, 2016), Next Wave Festival (Telltale, 2016), Gertrude Contemporary (In Concert, 2016).

Artists who work in the studios at APA are represented in major Australian art institutions. Some notable examples are the National Gallery of Australia (Lisa Reid, Dorothy Berry, Valerio Ciccone, Brigid Hanrahan, Chris Mason, Steven Perrette), National Gallery of Victoria (Boris Cipusev, Alan Constable, Bobby Kyriakopoulos ), Shepparton Art Museum (Michael Camakaris), State Library of Victoria (Chris Mason), Monash University Museum of Art (Julian Martin), National Sports Museum (Valerio Ciccone) Gold Coast City Gallery (Kaye McDonald), La Trobe University Museum of Art (George Aristovoulou), Deakin University Art Collection (Julian Martin), City of Melbourne Art and Heritage Collection (Julian Martin).

In 2021, the gallery moved to Collingwood Yards, an arts precinct in neighbouring suburb Collingwood, while studio operations continue in the original Northcote site.

== Selected exhibitions ==
- Minus/Plus, Georges Gallery Melbourne, toured to regional centres in Victoria, Australia, 1975.
- Tommy's World, Australian National Gallery, Canberra, toured nationally, 1980.
- Inside Out, Outside In, VicHealth Access Gallery, National Gallery of Victoria, 1992.
- Home Sweet Home, National Gallery of Australia, travelling exhibition, 2004.
- Pearls of Arts Project Australia – Stuart Purves Collection, Australian touring exhibition, 2007.
- Portrait Exchange, Arts Project Australia, Melbourne, 2010.
- Peripheral Vision, Valerio Ciccone retrospective exhibition, Arts Project Australia, Melbourne, 2012.
- Imaginarium, Cathy Staughton retrospective exhibition, Arts Project Australia, Melbourne, 2013.

== Selected external exhibitions ==
- Moet & Chandon Touring Exhibition, 1994 (Julian Martin).
- Centre D’Art Differencie, Belgium, 1994.
- MADMusee, Liège, Belgium, 1995.
- 2nd Annual Intuit Show of Folk and Outsider Art, Phyllis Kind Gallery, New York, 2004.
- From Australia with Art, Une sardine collee au mur, Switzerland, 2005.
- Outsider Art Fair, USA, Phyllis Kind Gallery, New York, 2005.
- 17th Annual Outsider Art Fair, The Mart, USA, 2009
- The Shilo Project, The Ian Potter Museum, University Of Melbourne, 2009.
- Exhibition #4, Museum of Everything, London, 2011.
- Melbourne Now, National Gallery of Victoria, Melbourne, 2013 (Boris Cipusev, Alan Constable and Patrick Francis).

== Collection ==
The Arts Project Australia Sydney Myer Fund Permanent Collection is one of the few collections of artwork by artists with intellectual disabilities in Australia. It comprises approximately 500 drawings, photographs and paintings from the mid-1970s sourced from the organisation's pioneering exhibitions Minus/Plus (1975) and Tommy's World I (1980). APA additionally houses a permanent collection of significant works from studio artists and international work, as well as an historical archive of organisational letters and documents. Artists from Arts Project Australia are widely represented externally to the organisation in international, Australian and private collections.

== Industry partnerships and affiliations ==
- Sidney Myer Foundation
- Public Galleries Association of Victoria
- Leonard Joel Auction House

== Publications ==
- Cathy Staughton's Wondrous Imaginarium, ISBN 978-0-9586659-0-2
- Julian Martin Transformer, ISBN 978-0-9586659-1-9
- The Inner View - Arts Project Australia, ISBN 978-0-9586659-2-6
- A Sense of Place, ISBN 978-0-9586659-3-3
- John Mackay Northe, ISBN 978-0-9586659-4-0
- Dorothy Berry – Bird on a wire, ISBN 978-0-9586659-5-7
- Alan Constable – View Finder, ISBN 978-0-9586659-6-4
- So Far..., ISBN 978-0-9586659-7-1
- Somewhere in the City, ISBN 978-0-9586659-8-8
- Lisa Reid – The Devil's in the Detail, ISBN 978-0-9586659-9-5
- It Takes More Than 140 Characters to Write a Novel, ISBN 978-0-9943995-0-2
