= Anne Lynch (artist) =

Australian artist (born 1956)

Australian artist Anne Lynch.

Anne Lynch (born Melbourne 1956) is an Australian artist, working primarily as a draftsperson and printmaker in the genre of Outsider art. Her artwork has been shown internationally and is represented in the Self-Taught and Outsider Art Research Collection at the Callan Park Gallery for Self-Taught and Outsider Art, University of Sydney. Since 1995, Lynch has been a dedicated studio artist at Arts Project Australia in Northcote, an organization that supports the creativity and artwork of artists with an intellectual disability. Lynch's figurative pastel works evoke a sense of isolation and melancholy.

== Career, themes and style ==
In Lynch’s pastel works, she depicts lone figures over planes of colour. The Arts Project Australia website describes Lynch’s works as ‘fleeting moments in time, [which] carry an air of nostalgia and memoir.’ In 2013 Lynch presented her first solo exhibition at the Arts Project Australia Gallery and has been included in numerous group exhibitions, both locally and internationally, notably ‘Renegades: Outsider Art’, The Arts Centre Gold Coast, Surfers Paradise in 2014 and ‘Outsider Art Fair’, Phyllis Kind Gallery, New York City in 2005. As a well-known figure in Australian Outsider Art, Lynch's works are represented in collection at the National Gallery of Australia and in the Stuart Purves Collection. Lynch has further exhibited at the National Gallery of Victoria, with curator Anonda Bell noting in the exhibition catalogue Lynch's interest in aestheticising sport, writing, "Anne Lynch’s footballers and gymnasts are rendered simply in beaming colours mirroring the joy of the sporting experience."

== Solo exhibitions ==
In 2013, Anne Lynch had a solo exhibition at the Arts Project Australia Gallery, Melbourne, Australia.

== Selected group exhibitions ==
The artwork of Ann Lynch has been included in several group exhibitions, including:

- Annual Gala Exhibition, Arts Project Australia Gallery, Melbourne (2015)
- Renegades: Outsider Art, The Arts Centre Gold Coast, Surfers Paradise, QLD (2014)
- Classic Albums, Tanks Art Centre, Cairns, QLD (2013)
- National Gallery of Victoria 150th event, Melbourne (2011)
- BloodLines: Art and the Horse, Latrobe Regional Gallery, Morwell, Victoria (2008)
- Outsider Art Fair, New York, United States. Hosted by the Phyllis Kind Gallery, New York (2005).
- Home Sweet Home: Works from the Peter Fay Collection, National Gallery of Australia Travelling exhibition (2005).
- Lynch was included in the 2nd Annual Intuit Show of Folk and Outsider Art, Chicago, United States, Hosted by the Phyllis Kind Gallery, New York (2004)
- Art of the Sacred Heart, Arts Project Australia Greenaway Art Gallery, Adelaide (2001).
- Arterial - Artists from Arts Project Australia, Paralympic Arts Festival, Sydney Opera House (2000)
- Connected, Geelong Art Gallery, Geelong (1999)
- Centre d’Art Differencié, Liége, Belgium (1996)
- Vita Gallery, Portland, Oregon (1995).

== Collections ==
Lynch’s work is represented in private collections and in the National Gallery of Australia collection (Accession No: NGA 2002.431.93) and the Stuart Purves Collection.
