= Boris Cipusev =

Australian artist

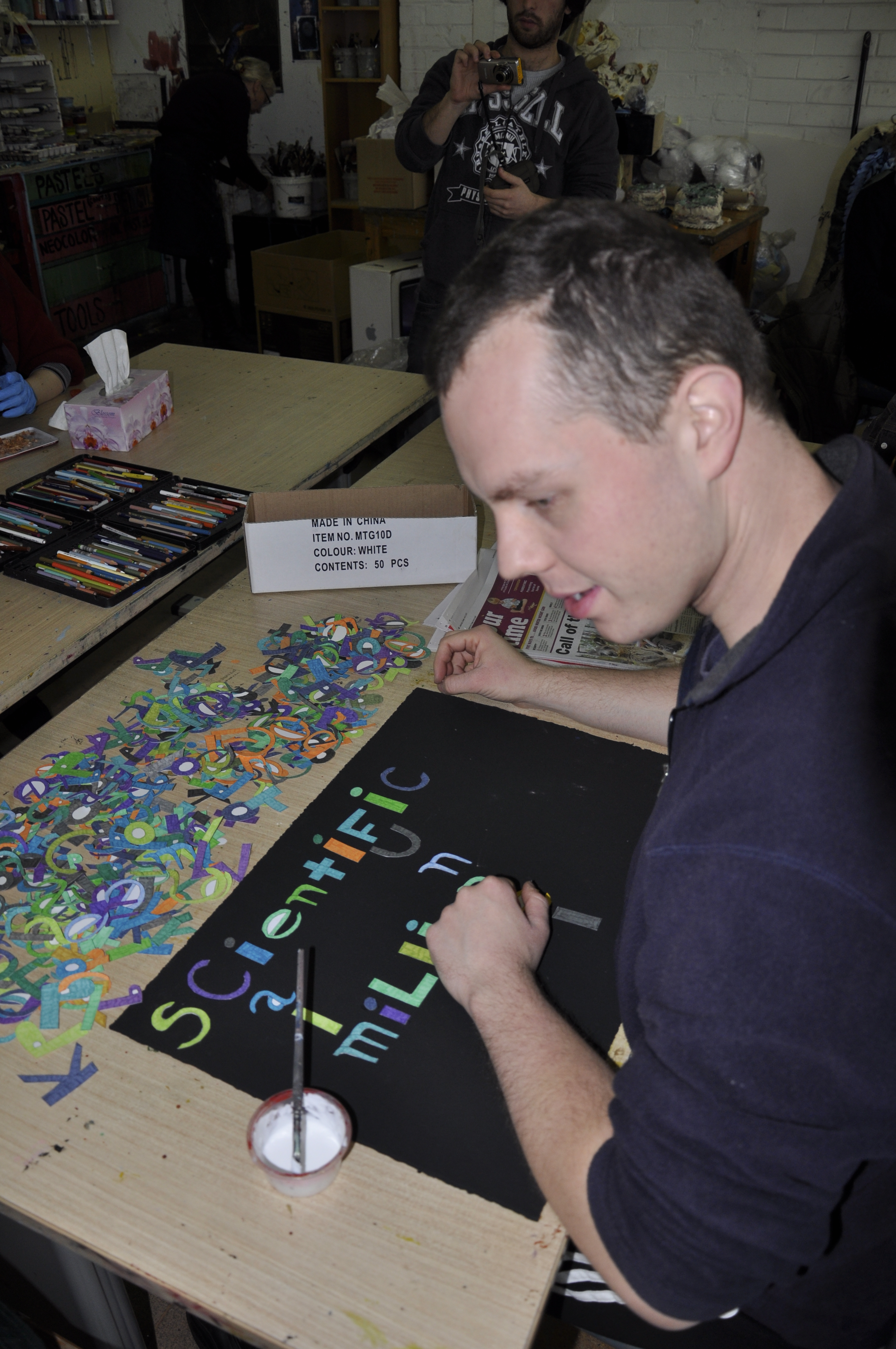
- Born: 1988 (age 36–37)

Boris Cipusev (born 1988) is an Australian artist known for his highly detailed and colourful drawings in felt-tip pen and watercolour pencil. His work often incorporates text sourced from signage and advertising billboards. He works in Melbourne at Arts Project Australia

== Early life ==
Boris Cipusev was born in 1988 in Melbourne, Australia. He is of Slovenian descent.

== Career ==
From 2007, Cipusev has been a regular studio artist at Arts Project Australia (APA) in Northcote, Melbourne, an organisation devoted to supporting and promoting artists with an intellectual disability. Although he received no formal training prior to commencing his studio residency there, his participation in the program at APA has provided him with access to fine art materials and the informal tuition provided by the practicing artists employed by the organisation.

Shortly following the commencement of his work at APA he began exhibiting regularly in Australia and participated in his first international group exhibitions in 2014, in Scotland and Canada.

In 2013, David Hurlston, curator of Australian art at the National Gallery of Victoria (NGV), selected a series of fifty drawings, entitled Who Next? (2010), for the landmark exhibition Melbourne Now. These works were also acquired for the collection of the NGV.

Cipusev's drawings have been noted for their visual representations of text. The works usually consist of a carefully placed word drawn in highly coloured felt-tip pen against a white background.

In 2021 NGV curators Sophie Gerhard and Beckett Rozentals selected works for a 2022 exhibition called Who Are You: Australian Portraiture, produced in association with the National Portrait Gallery in Canberra. The works included a wide range of types of portraiture, including Ciposev's text portrait of Jeff Fatt, a founder member of The Wiggles.

== Themes and practice ==
His work was described by the NGV as having "enigmatic juxtapositions and poetic resonances", owing to his manner of combining multiple word or word-number combinations which are open for deciphering and interpretation by viewers. His works are typically inspired by his immediate environment; advertising in the landscape, objects in his domestic home and workplace, television, the names of people he knows or figures from popular culture.

== Recognition ==
Cipusev's work Titanic Imax was a finalist for the Paul Guest Prize at the Bendigo Art Gallery in 2022.

== Selected group exhibitions ==
- Who Are You: Australian Portraiture, NGV, Melbourne, and National Portrait Gallery, Canberra, 2022
- Paper Projects, La Trobe University, Melbourne, 2016
- That's Funny, Arts Project Australia Gallery, Melbourne, 2015
- Connected, Yarra Gallery, Federation Square, Melbourne, 2014
- The Soft Knife, Casula Powerhouse Arts Centre, NSW, 2014
- Turning the Page, Gallery 101, Ottawa, Ontario, Canada, 2014
- Hybrid Making – new work from Australia, Canada, Scotland, Project Ability Gallery, Scotland, 2014
- Melbourne Now, National Gallery of Victoria, Melbourne, 2013 – 2014
- Repeat, Restate… Reiterate, Arts Project Australia Gallery, Melbourne, 2013
- Video Doctor, Arts Project Australia Gallery, Melbourne, 2013
- At the Table, Arts Project Australia Gallery, Melbourne, 2013
- Melbourne Art Fair, Melbourne, 2012
- Detours through abstraction, Arts Project Australia Gallery, Melbourne, 2011
- High Views, Northern Exposure Festival, Northcote Town Hall, Melbourne, 2010
- Hidden, Arts Project Australia Gallery, Melbourne, 2010
- Frank and Friends, Sheffer Gallery, Sydney, 2010
- Licorice Allsorts, King Street Gallery on William, Sydney, 2009
- Studio Days, Arts Project Australia Gallery, Melbourne, 2007

== Collections ==
- Ian Potter Centre at the NGV
- National Gallery of Victoria, Melbourne
