= Valerio Ciccone =

Australian artist (born 1970)

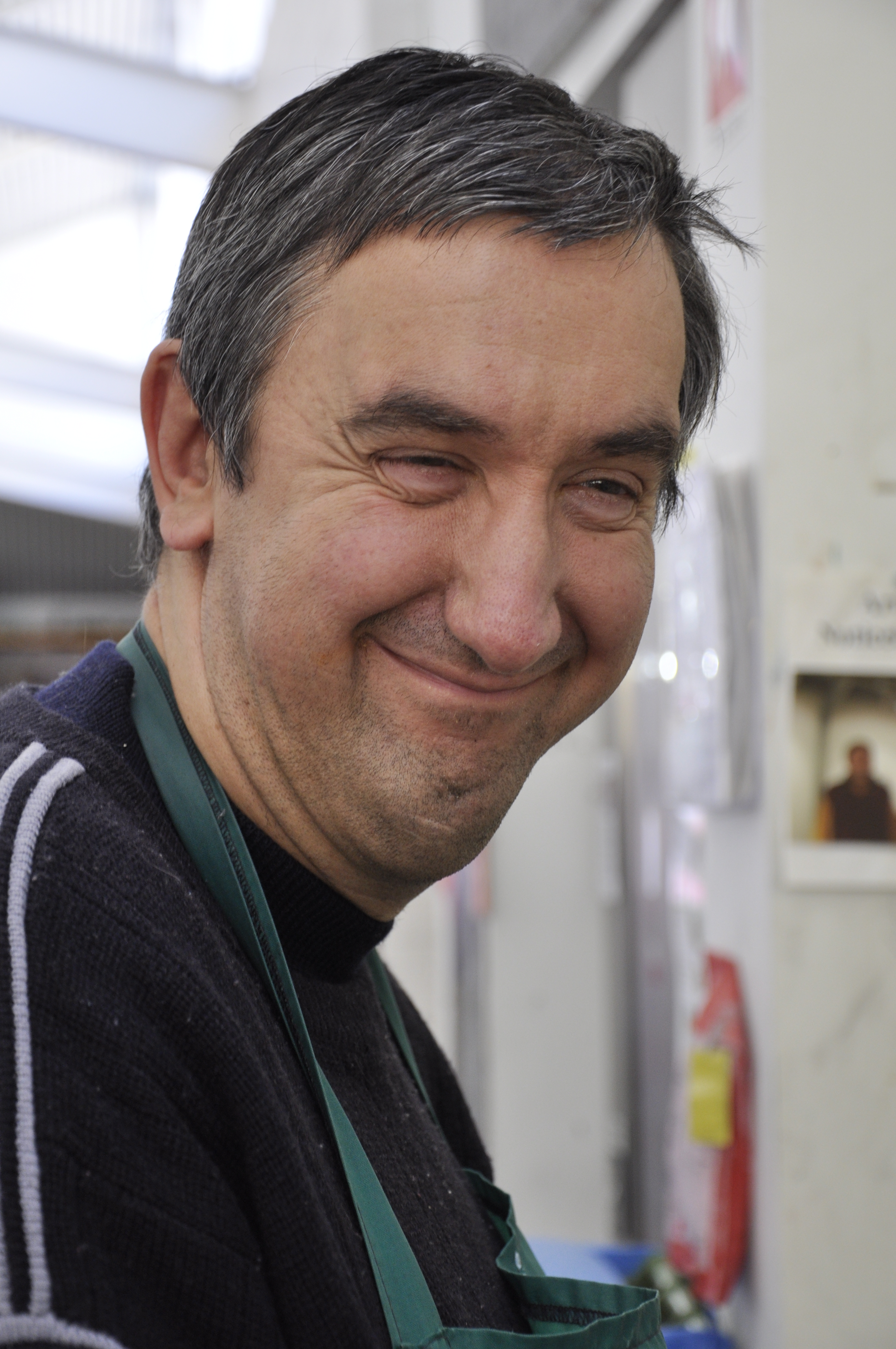
- Born: 1970 (age 55–56); Melbourne, Australia
- Movement: genre of Outsider Art

Valerio Ciccone (born 1970 in Melbourne) is an Australian artist who is best known for his drawings of mass-media events and icons taken from popular culture. He has worked from his Northcote-based studio at Arts Project Australia since 1984, where he has also had numerous solo shows. He has exhibited widely, both nationally and internationally [see Exhibitions] and his work is held in the collections of the National Gallery of Australia, Trinkhall Museum, Liège, and the National Sports Museum.

== Early life and education ==
Ciccone grew up in the semi-rural suburb of Yarrambat, the third of four children. According to his mother, he began “drawing obsessively” from the age of four or five, and even at this young age his key source of imagery was taken from the mass media (television and newspapers). It was during his childhood that he began creating his collection of rendered logos from favourite television shows, a collection he has continued to expand throughout his life, alongside others, including a collection of music cassettes which extends to over 1000 objects. Ciccone has demonstrated an extraordinary memory for these collections (which remain unlabelled and yet are perfectly organised and accessible for him) and an ability to recall the names of individual persons met briefly, over periods stretching many years. This ability has been noted as a key component of his artwork, informing the connections he draws between figures of public life and popular culture, and the attention to detail in his technical execution.

In 1984 Ciccone was one of the first artists to take up a studio residency at Arts Project Australia (APA), an organisation devoted to supporting and promoting artists with an intellectual disability. Although he has received little formal training, his participation in the studio program at APA provided him with access to fine art materials and the informal tuition provided by the practicing artists employed by the organisation. He also spent a number of years attending weekly drawing classes at the School of Art at RMIT University. Ciccone’s early works were in watercolour and in the early 1990s he produced a series of monochrome drawings featuring imagery and text taken directly from newspapers. Following a serious illness in 1993 and a lengthy period of rehabilitation, his work underwent a significant change as he introduced colour to his palette. During this time he produced artworks centred on the actions and heroics of Australian Rules Football players, one of which has been acquired for the permanent collection of the National Sports Museum.

== Career, themes and style ==
Glenn Barkley, Curator at the Museum of Contemporary Art Australia, has described Ciccone’s “obsessive engagement” with television and mass media presentations of sporting events as being a quintessential trait of his generation, stating that for “Generation X,” there is “little difference between what we might watch and how we might feel.” He notes the manner in which Ciccone democratises his subjects, describing an oeuvre of works in which “cathedrals are as important as the corner of a studio and lions lie with mice, and elephants, and koala bears.” However, Barkley is careful to point out that Ciccone’s works are not flippant; he attributes his use of low-brow televisual imagery to a project which elevates and finds meaning in banal aspects of contemporary life, claiming that he “celebrates the mundane, the disposable and finds it beautiful.” Stylistically, Ciccone’s rendering of mass media personages and events in soft, layered pastel, work towards this elevation of his subject, transforming the “flatness of newsprint or flickering image on the screen” into something “warm and personal.”

Although best known for his works in pastel on paper, Ciccone has worked in a range of mediums including painting, printmaking, ceramics and digital animation. His work has been categorised within the genre of Outsider Art and has been included in Outsider Art exhibitions and fairs, both in Australia and in the USA. However, in recent years his work has also achieved success in more conventional art institutions and has been acquired for major permanent collections at the National Gallery of Australia (Print Archive) and MADMusée, Liège, Belgium.

== Solo exhibitions ==
Valerio Ciccone, Arts Project Australia Gallery, Melbourne, 2014

Valerio Ciccone: Peripheral Observer, Arts Project Australia Gallery, Melbourne, 2012

Ball! Arts Project Australia Gallery, Melbourne, 1999

Works by Valerio Ciccone, Pinacotheca, Melbourne, 1996

Works on Paper by Valerio Ciccone, Pinacotheca, 1994

== Selected group exhibitions ==
red ball: the fine art of footy, Red Gallery, Fitzroy North, Melbourne, 2016

The 64th Blake Prize, Casula Powerhouse Arts Centre, Casula, NSW, 2016

After…, Arts Project Australia Gallery, Melbourne, 2015

Melbourne Art Fair, Royal Exhibition Building, Melbourne, 1994 – 2014

Renegades: Outsider Art, national travelling exhibition, 2013 – 2014

Into the Vault and Out of the Box, Arts Project Australia Gallery, Melbourne, 2014

Video Doctor, Arts Project Australia Gallery, Melbourne, 2013

Classic Albums, Tank Art Centre, Cairns, QLD, 2013,

Classic Albums, Arts Project Australia Gallery, Melbourne, 2012

Fresh off the press, Arts Project Australia Gallery, Melbourne, 2011

This Sensual World, Arts Project Australia Gallery, Melbourne, 2011

Fred, Ginger and Other Stories, Delmar Gallery, Ashfield, 2011

Portrait Exchange, Arts Project Australia Gallery, Melbourne, 2010

Pictures of You, Arts Project Australia Gallery, Melbourne, 2009

BloodLines: Art and the Horse, national travelling exhibition, 2007 – 2009

Pearls of Arts Project Australia: The Stuart Purves Collection, national travelling exhibition, 2007 – 2009

Portraits of Artists, Place Gallery, Richmond, Melbourne, 2008

Behind the Scenes, Arts Project Australia Gallery, Melbourne, 2008

The Dinner Party, Arts Project Australia Gallery, Melbourne, 2007

Yours, Mine and Ours: 50 Years of ABC TV, Penrith Regional Gallery & The Lewers Bequest, Penrith, 2006

Leo Cussen with Selected Artists, Australian Galleries, Collingwood, 2005

10th Sydney Art on Paper Fair, Byron Kennedy Hall, Moore Park, Sydney, 2005

Amour, gloire et beauté, MADMusée, Liège, Belgium, 2005

Artists’ Books, Arts Project Australia Gallery, Melbourne, 2005

Figures humaines, Galerie du MAD, Liège, Belgium, 2004

2nd Annual Intuit Show of Folk and Outsider Art, Chicago, United States, Hosted by the Phyllis Kind Gallery, New York, 2004

Printed Matter, Arts Project Australia, Melbourne, 2004

Fair Game, The Ian Potter Centre; NGV Australia Response Gallery

A Sense of Place, Arts Project Australia Gallery, Melbourne, 2003

Articulations, Australian Print Workshop, Melbourne, 2000

Arterial, Paralympic Arts Festival, Studio Foyer, Sydney Opera House, Sydney, 2000

On Track, Arts Project Australia Gallery, Melbourne, 2000

Works on Paper, Australian Galleries, Sydney, 1999

Connexions Particulières, MADmusée and Musée d’Art Comtemporain, Liège, Belgium, 1999

The Inner View, Arts Project Australia Gallery, Melbourne, 1999

Ball! Another view of football, Arts Project Australia Gallery, Melbourne, 1998

Nexus, Project Space, RMIT, Melbourne, 1997

The Footy Show, Artists Garden, Fitzroy, Melbourne, 1997

Eyes on the Ball: Images of Australian Rules Football, Waverley City Gallery, 1996

Wild Things, Arts Project Australia Gallery, Melbourne, 1996

The 50th Anniversary Exhibition, The Australian National Maritime Museum, Darling Harbour, Sydney, 1995

Reversed Image, Arts Project Australia Gallery, Melbourne, 1995

Jacaranda Acquisitive Drawing Award, Grafton Regional Gallery, Grafton, 1994

Beyond Words, VicHealth Access Gallery, National Gallery of Victoria, Melbourne, 1994

Inside Out/Outside In, National Gallery of Victoria, Melbourne, 1992

Figeac Festival, France, 1991

ILSMH Exposition Internationale, Paris, 1990

“Roar 2” Studios, Fitzroy, Melbourne, 1989

== Publications ==
Valerio Ciccone: Peripheral Observer, exhibition catalogue, Arts Project Australia, Melbourne, 2011. ISBN 9780646582351

== Collections ==
Australian Gallery of Sport Permanent Collection

MADmusée, Permanent Collection, Liège, Belgium

National Gallery of Australia, Print archive
