= Julian Martin =

Australian artist (born 1969)

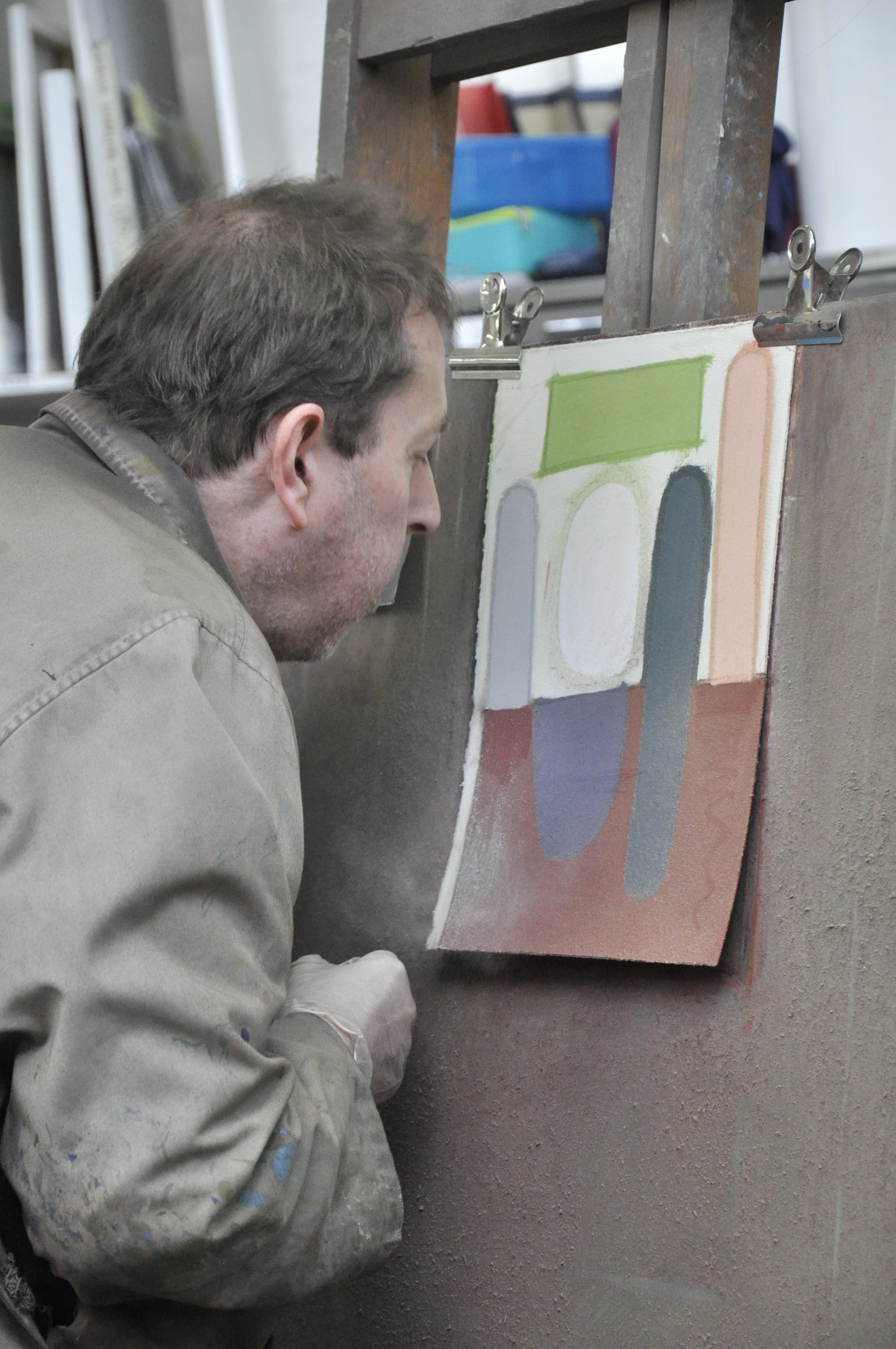
Julian Martin in September 2015

Julian Martin (born Melbourne 1969) is an Australian artist, known primarily for his pastel drawings and self-portraits. Martin resides in the Melbourne suburb of Doncaster, and has worked from his Northcote-based studio at Arts Project Australia since 1989, where he has also had numerous solo shows. He has exhibited widely, both nationally and internationally [see Exhibitions] and in 1994 he was a finalist in the Moët & Chandon Travelling Fellowship. In 2014 he was the winner of the Australian State Trustees Connected art prize. His work is held in several public collections, including the Deakin University Art Collection, the City of Melbourne Art and Heritage Collection and Monash University Museum of Art.

== Early life and education ==
Martin was diagnosed with autism at the age of two and was supported and encouraged by his parents, who claimed that his diagnosis had 'cemented' their family and that he showed signs of 'promise'. He attended a program for special-needs children, but did not start making art until approximately the age of ten. During his time at an autism-specific school, which he attended for several years, he "won a minor art prize", however the early promise identified by his parents was not realised until 1989, when an instructor at the Adult Day Centre at which Martin attended recognised his artistic talent. Shortly thereafter he began working at Arts Project Australia, an organisation devoted to supporting and promoting artists with an intellectual disability. Although Martin received no formal training, his participation in the studio program at Arts Project Australia gave him access to fine art materials and the informal tuition provided by the practising artists employed by the organisation. It was one such artist who, in the early 1990s, suggested the use of a mirror as a drawing aid, which eventually led to the development of his signature depictions of mask-like faces executed in pastel. These early works were exhibited in Martin's first solo show, entitled Pastel Drawings at the Australian Galleries in Collingwood, Melbourne.

== Career, themes and style ==
Both Martin's lack of formal training and autism have identified him as one of the key figures within the outsider art category in Australia. This categorisation is confirmed by his repeated inclusion in Outsider Art exhibitions and fairs, both in Australia and in the USA. However, in recent years his work has also achieved success in more conventional art institutions and Alex Baker, former curator of contemporary art at the National Gallery of Victoria has likened his works to those of American abstract artists of the 1930s and 1940s such as Adolph Gottlieb, William Baziotes and Ad Reinhardt, claiming that they are similarly characterised by "pictographic, biomorphic and hard-edged abstraction".

A highly prolific artist whose works number in the hundreds and are stored in the archival collection of Arts Project Australia, Martin's work has developed from early abstracted monochrome figures and profiles into a practice which combines source material found in newspapers and magazines with the bold, flattened geometric repetition of form that has become his "signature style". Recent works are drawn from mainly photographic and physical sources ranging from depictions of Hollywood celebrities, politicians and sports stars to an eclectic range of kitchen utensils, tools, letters and logos. The expansion of subject matter in recent work has been accompanied with a more textural and layered use of the familiar pastel medium – Baker notes the use of etching implements to create works which are "abraded, scoured and pitted", stating that they stand as "testimony to the artist's vigorous process".

== Exhibitions ==
=== Solo exhibitions ===
- Pastel Drawings, Australian Galleries, Collingwood, 1995
- Sempiternal Variations, Arts Project Australia Gallery, Melbourne, 2001
- New Works, Arts Project Australia Gallery, Melbourne, 2003
- Julian Martin Recent Works, Arts Project Australia Gallery, Melbourne, 2006
- Draw, Manningham Gallery, Melbourne, 2009
- Julian Martin New Work, Kitty Somerset, Northcote, 2011
- Julian Martin: Transformer, Arts Project Australia Gallery, Melbourne, 2014
- Julian Martin Solo, No Vacancy Project Space, Melbourne, 2015

=== Selected group exhibitions ===
- Artists from Arts Project, Artist's Garden, Fitzroy, 1990
- Working Art, Arts Project Australia Gallery, Melbourne, 1994
- Beyond Words, National Gallery of Victoria, VicHealth Access Gallery, 1994
- Moët et Chandon Travelling Exhibition, National Gallery of Victoria, Melbourne, 1994
- Reversed Image, Arts Project Australia Gallery, Melbourne, 1995
- Vita Gallery, Portland, Oregon, USA, 1995
- Art des Antipodes, MADMusée, Liège, Belgium, 1995
- Eyes on the Ball, National Touring Exhibition, MOMA (Heide), Melbourne, 1996
- Border Crossing, McClelland Regional Gallery, Langwarrin, Victoria, 1996
- Drawing on Experience: Reflections on Popular Culture (National touring exhibition), Arts Project Australia Gallery, Melbourne, 1996
- Prints and Artists Books, Arts Project Australia Gallery, Melbourne, 1997
- Knock Knock group show, Australian Galleries, Melbourne, 1997
- Bazaar, Pitspace, RMIT, Bundoora, 1998
- La Femme, Arts Project Australia Gallery, Melbourne, 1999
- Nillumbik Art Award, Melbourne, 1999
- Artists from Arts Project Australia, Australian Galleries Works on Paper, Sydney, 1999
- On Track, Arts Project Australia Gallery, Melbourne
- Arterial – artists from Arts Project Australia, Paralympic Arts Festival, Sydney Opera House, Sydney, 2000
- Histoires de vivre, Musée du Louvre, Paris, 2000
- Face-Up, Idiom Studio, Wellington, New Zealand, 2001
- Art of the Sacred Heart, Greenaway Art Gallery, Adelaide, 2001
- Suburban Dreamers, Moore's Building, Fremantle, 2002
- Headspace, National Neuroscience Facility, Melbourne, 2003
- Fair Game, NGV Response Gallery, Melbourne, 2003
- A Sense of Place, Arts Project Australia Gallery, Melbourne, 2003
- Visual Disobedience, Arts Project Australia Gallery, Melbourne, 2005
- 2nd Annual Intuit Show of Folk and Outsider Art, Chicago, United States, 2005, New York
- Dealer's Choice, Phyllis Kind Gallery, New York, USA, 2005
- South of the Border, Arts Project Australia Gallery, Melbourne, 2005
- Leo Cussen with Selected Artists, Australian Galleries, Collingwood, 2005
- Australian Outsiders, Jack Fischer Gallery, California, USA, 2006
- In Everyone's Company, Arts Project Australia Gallery, Melbourne, 2006
- Lets Get Lost, Arts Project Australia Gallery, Melbourne
- Pearls of Arts Project Australia, Stuart Purves Collection, NSW, 2009; 2008; 2007
- Alan Constable & Julian Martin, Australian Galleries, Melbourne, 2009
- Pictures of You, Arts Project Australia Gallery, Melbourne, 2009
- Snapshot, ACGA Gallery, Federation Square, Melbourne, 2009
- Myscape, Trongate & Collins Gallery, Strathclyde University, Glasgow, Scotland, 2010
- Hidden, Arts Project Australia Gallery, Melbourne, 2010
- Colour My World, Arts Project Australia Gallery, Melbourne, 2011
- Exhibition #4, Museum of Everything, London, 2011
- Paint It Black, Arts Project Australia Gallery, Melbourne, 2012
- Halo and the Glory of Art, McGlade Gallery, ACU Sydney, 2012
- At the Table, Arts Project Australia, Melbourne, 2013
- Outsiderism, Fleisher/Ollman, Philadelphia, USA, 2013
- Renegades: Outsider Art, KickArts Contemporary Arts, Cairns QLD, 2013
- Chicago Expo Fleisher/Ollman Gallery, Chicago USA, 2013
- Rick Amor Drawing Prize, Art Gallery of Ballarat, Victoria, 2014
- The Armory Show, (Fleisher/Ollman booth), New York, USA, 2014
- Renegades: Outsider Art, The Arts Centre Gold Coast, Surfers Paradise, QLD, 2014
- Animal Magnetism, Arts Project Australia Gallery, Melbourne, 2014
- National Works on Paper, Mornington Peninsula Regional Gallery, 2014; 2000; 1998
- Renegades: Outsider Art, Moree Plains Gallery, Moree, NSW, 2014
- 6° of Separation, Arts Project Australia Gallery, Melbourne, 2014
- Melbourne Art Fair, Royal Exhibition Building, Melbourne, 2014; 2012; 2010; 2008; 2006; 2004; 2002; 2000
- Everyday imagining: new perspectives on Outsider art, The Ian Potter Museum of Art, The University of Melbourne, 2014
- Connected, Yarra Gallery, Federation Square, Melbourne, 2014; 2010; 2009; 2003–2007;1999
- Down The Rabbit Hole, Arts Project Australia Gallery, Melbourne, 2015
- The Salon, Scott Livesey Galleries, Melbourne, 2015
- The Outsider Art Fair 2015, (Fleisher/Ollman booth), New York, USA, 2016; 2015; 2014; 2009
- Paper Projects, La Trobe University, Melbourne, 2016
- Measurably Long Kool, Fleisher Ollman, Philadelphia, USA, 2016
- Here and Now, Sofitel Melbourne on Collins, Melbourne, 2016

== Publications ==
Julian Martin: Transformer, exhibition catalogue, Arts Project Australia, Melbourne, 2014. ISBN 9780958665919

== Collections ==
- Deakin University, Victoria
- City of Melbourne, Victoria
- Monash University Museum of Art, Victoria
- Ecovantage, Victoria
- STOARC, NSW
- Concept Economics, Canberra, private collection of Henry Ergas
