= Christopher Mason =

Christopher Mason may refer to:

- Christopher Mason, character in the 2007 novel The Russian Concubine
- Christopher E. Mason, professor at Weill Cornell Medicine

== See also ==
- Chris Mason (disambiguation)
