= Dorothy Berry =

Australian female artist (born 1942)

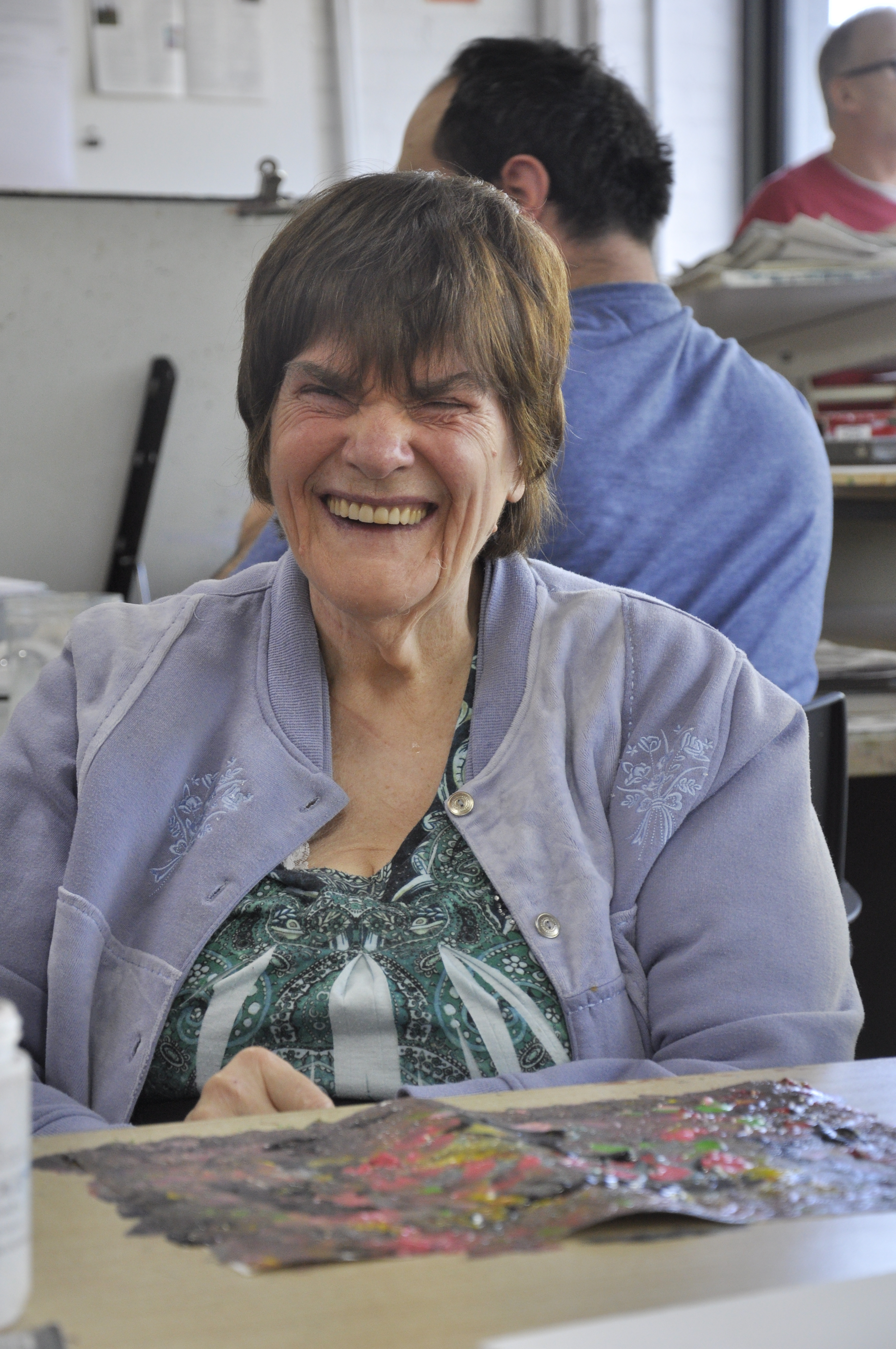
- Australian artist Dorothy Berry
- Born: 1942 (age 83–84); Melbourne, Victoria, Australia
- Known for: Artists with disabilities
- Style: Outsider art, Art Brut

Dorothy Berry (born 1942) is an Australian artist working in the genres of Outsider art, and Art Brut, based in Melbourne, Victoria, Australia. She is known primarily for her densely composed depictions of animals and birdlife, executed in pastel. Berry resides in the Melbourne suburb of Kingsbury and has worked from her Northcote-based studio at Arts Project Australia since 1985. Berry's work has been represented in four solo exhibitions, and has exhibited widely, both nationally and internationally in group shows, including ‘My Puppet, My Secret Self’, at the Substation, Newport; ‘Inside Out/Outside In’, Access Gallery, National Gallery of Victoria, Melbourne; and ‘Turning the Page’, Gallery 101, Ottawa, Ontario, Canada. Her work is held in the collections of the National Gallery of Australia and MADMusée, Liège, Belgium, and the Centre for Australian Art.

== Early life and education ==
Berry is primarily a self-taught artist who attributes her artistic talents to her mother. Since 1985 she has maintained a studio at Arts Project Australia (APA), an organization devoted to supporting and promoting artists living with an intellectual disability. The APA does not provide training but rather, provides access to fine art materials. Although her work has thematically changed very little over the course of her career she substituted pastel for paint as the preferred medium for her work during the early years of her studio residency at APA.

== Exhibitions ==
Another APA artist, Maxine Ryder, proposed a collaborative project with Berry resulting in the exhibition Cut It Out (referring to the collaborative wood cut-outs) in the 1995 show. Berry's first solo exhibition followed shortly thereafter, in 1996. During the late 1980s and early 1990s, she attended weekly life-drawing classes at the School of Art at Phillip Institute of Technology (now RMIT University).

== Collections ==
Berry's work is included in three museum collections. Berry has been identified as one of Australia's key artists within the Outsider Art genre, as can be evidenced by her inclusion in major Outsider Art exhibitions and fairs. Her work has been acquired for major collections at the National Gallery of Australia (Accession number: NGA 2002.431.466) and MADMusée, Liège, Belgium. Two of her lithographs, are held in the collection of the Centre for Australian Art.

== Career, themes and style ==
Berry's work is described in the popular press as both “instinctive” and “spontaneous,” Recurring themes in her work are animals, birds, and religion, for the course of her career. Maxine Ryder, who collaborated with Berry in her early years and returned to Australia to curate a retrospective exhibition of her work twenty years later, remarks on the autobiographical nature of Berry's work, noting that her bird imagery is most likely a form of self-portraiture and that the recurring themes of marriage and motherhood in her self-portraits are a response to her acquired disability. Her best-known pastel works, which use a palette of heavily saturated colours, feature strong line-work and a stylistic tendency to layer and rework imagery; so much so, that the artwork itself is often destroyed in the process of its making. In recent years, Berry's works have become less gestural and smaller in scale, most likely due to increasing limitations on her physical mobility. In addition to pastel, the artist also works in lithography, acrylic paint and ink whereby "Throughout this experimentation with this variety of mediums, she has remained thematically consistent throughout her years as an artist". Arts writer Samantha Wilson notes that Berry's work "goes from simple line drawings to crowded larger works always with a certain clarity about the images that she wants to depict, from the segmented women’s bodies in the autobiographical section, to the darker, more solid palettes of her depictions of religious figures and nuns."

== Solo exhibitions ==
Berry has had four solo exhibitions: Dorothy Berry – Bird on a Wire, Arts Project Australia Gallery, Melbourne, 2009; A Survey 1987-2002, Arts Project Australia Gallery, Melbourne, 2002; Recent works, Arts Project Australia Gallery, Melbourne, 1998; Penguins, Ducks, Owls & Angels, Arts Project Australia Gallery, Melbourne, 1996

== Selected group exhibitions ==
Berry has exhibited in over 30 group exhibitions including:

- Home, locations around Arts Centre Melbourne, the city and the surrounds, 2015
- Melbourne Art Fair, Royal Exhibition Building, Melbourne, 1994 – 2014
- Renegades: Outsider Art, national touring exhibition, 2013 - 2014
- Into the Vault and Out of the Box, Arts Project Australia Gallery, Melbourne, 2014
- Repeat. Restate…Reiterate, Arts Project Australia Gallery, Melbourne, 2013
- My Puppet, My Secret Self, The Substation, Newport, 2012
- Halo and the Glory of Art, McGlade Gallery, ACU Sydney, 2011 - 2012
- This Sensual World, Arts Project Australia, Melbourne, 2011
- Human Nature, Alan Lane Community Gallery; Warrnambool Art Gallery, Warrnambool, 2010
- Fully Booked, Arts Project Australia Gallery, Melbourne, 2010
- By Hand, Arts Project Australia Gallery, Melbourne, 2009
- Snapshot, ACGA Gallery, Federation Square, Melbourne, 2009
- Pearls of Arts Project Australia: The Stuart Purves Collection, National touring exhibition, 2007 - 2009
- The Year of the Bird, Hawkesbury Regional Gallery, NSW, 2008
- Reaching Out, Waldron Hall, County Court of Victoria, Melbourne, 2008
- A Lucid Moment, Arts Project Australia Gallery, Melbourne, 2007
- Yours, Mine and Ours: 50 Years of ABC TV, Penrith Regional Gallery & The Lewers Bequest, Emu Plains, NSW, 2006
- Leo Cussen with Selected Artists, Australian Galleries, Collingwood, Melbourne, 2005
- S,M,L,XL, Arts Project Australia Gallery, Melbourne, 2005
- Home Sweet Home: Works from the Peter Fay Collection, international touring exhibition (Australia and New Zealand), 2004 - 2005
- Exchange, Arts Project Australia Gallery, Melbourne, 2004
- A Sense of Place, Arts Project Australia Gallery, Melbourne, 2003
- Chic, Arts Project Australia Gallery, Melbourne, 2002
- Life Stories, Arts Project Australia, 2001
- Histoire de vivre, l’Orangerie du Luxembourg, Paris, France, 2000
- On Track, Arts Project Australia Gallery, Melbourne, 2000
- Connexions Particulières, MADMusée and Musée d’Art Moderne et d’Art Contemporain, Liège, Belgium, 1999
- Bazaar, Pitspace, RMIT, Bundoora, Melbourne, 1998
- Prints & Artists’ Books, Arts Project Australia Gallery, Melbourne, 1997
- Cut it Out, Collaboration with Maxine Ryder, Arts Project Australia Gallery, Melbourne, 1995
- Art des Antipodes, MADMusée, Liège, Belgium, 1995
- Vita Gallery, Oregon, USA, 1995
- Beyond Words VicHealth Access Gallery, National Gallery of Victoria, 1994
- MADMusée, Liège, Belgium, 1993
- Inside Out/Outside In, Access Gallery, National Gallery of Victoria, Melbourne, 1992

== Publications ==
Cheryl Daye (ed.) Dorothy Berry: Bird on a Wire, exhibition catalogue, Arts Project Australia, Melbourne, 2009. ISBN 9780958665957
