= Lisa Reid =

Australian artist (born 1975)

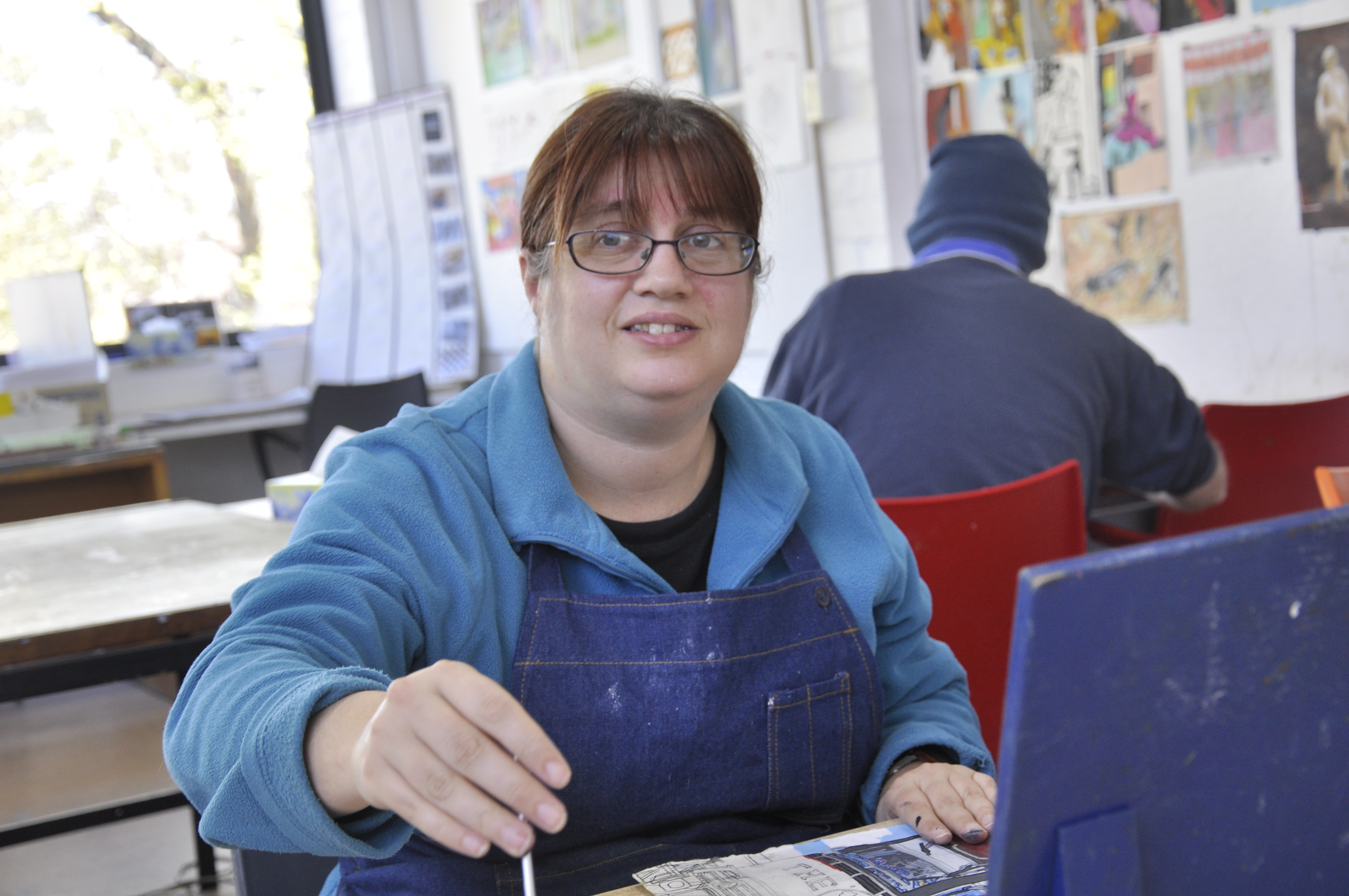
Artist Lisa Reid.

Lisa Reid (born in 1975 in Melbourne) is an Australian artist, known primarily for her highly detailed figurative works in a variety of mediums. Reid has worked from her Northcote-based studio at Arts Project Australia (APA) since 2000, where she held her first solo show in 2015. She has exhibited widely, both nationally and internationally and her work was recently selected for the landmark exhibition Painting. More Painting, at the Australian Centre for Contemporary Art, Melbourne. Her work is held in the collection of the National Gallery of Australia.

== Early life and education ==
In an autobiographical digital animation entitled My Story, Reid presents her childhood as one marked by bullying in mainstream education and complains that her forays into "special education" were also unsatisfactory, with educators making no effort to teach her literacy. Following her graduation from a transitional TAFE course, she describes her experience working in a factory setting as "slave labour." More positive experiences are present in Reid's autobiographical opus – chiefly her talent for swimming (she has been a competitor and finalist in the Special Olympics since the age of fifteen) and art. Since 2000 she has been working at the studio at Arts Project Australia, an organisation devoted to supporting and promoting artists with an intellectual disability. Although no formal fine art training is provided at APA, her participation in the studio program there has provided her with access to fine art materials and the informal tuition provided by the practicing artists employed by the organisation. During the formative early years of residency at the studio, her paintings and drawings presented muted, monochromatic, anonymous figures, sourced from magazines and newspapers. In 2002 a family photograph album became a pivotal source in developing Reid's work, providing her with the source material for a personal narrative as her subject matter. During this time she also attended a life drawing class at RMIT University and began to develop her meticulous signature style.

== Career, themes and style ==
Reid's work has remained primarily figurative throughout her career, and has become recognisable by the "highly detailed" and "intricate" style of art-making she has adopted across a range of mediums including painting, printmaking, ceramics and digital media, with subject matter sourced from personal photographs, life drawing and images from popular culture. Due to the meticulous "small stroke" technique which she employs in her practice, individual works will sometimes take her several months or even years to complete, and her method is to work on several projects simultaneously. Reid's objective in adopting this laborious process, is to reproduce her source imagery as realistically as possible, in the manner of photorealist artists. The mode in which Reid transfers her signature small stroke technique directly from traditional to digital media, has prompted Melbourne writer and art critic Dylan Rainforth to draw a parallel between the work of Reid and that of the Australian artist Richard Lewer, who he claims employs a similar process in his digital practice. Both artists, he states, employ this technique to "reinforce the pathos" of their narrative works. The flattening of pictorial space in Reid's painting has also led Rainforth to compare her work and to that of early Modernists such as Paul Cézanne and Georges Braque.

Reid's work is known for appropriating the imagery and icons of popular culture, particular Australian culture, which led to Reid's inclusion in a merchandise collaboration between National Gallery of Victoria, Arts Project Australia and Third Drawer Down.

Reid has been identified as one of Australia's key artists within the Outsider Art category, as can be evidenced by her inclusion in major Outsider Art exhibitions and fairs in Australia and the USA. Prompted by the inclusion of her portrait of the art collector and artist Peter Fay in the Salon de Refusés in 2008, the artwork was reproduced in Art Monthly Australia, where then-editor Maurice O’Riordan – referring to both artist and subject – described it as "an eloquent statement of triumph against ‘established’ odds." In 2016 her work was included in Painting. More Painting at the Australian Centre for Contemporary Art and her work has also been acquired for the collection of the National Gallery of Australia.

== Solo exhibitions ==
Lisa Reid: The Devil's in the Detail, Arts Project Australia Gallery, Melbourne, 2015

== Selected group exhibitions ==
- Painting. More Painting, Australian Centre for Contemporary Art, Melbourne, 2016
- Clay: it's a matter of substance, Arts Project Australia, Melbourne, 2016
- Drawn Together, Arts Project Australia Gallery, Melbourne, 2015
- Renegades: Outsider Art, National Touring Exhibition, 2013–2015
- Portia Geach Memorial Award, The National Trust, S.H Ervin Gallery, Sydney, 2014
- Sit Down, Shut Up and Watch, Film & New Media Festival, South Australia, 2014
- Everyday imagining: new perspectives on Outsider art, The Ian Potter Museum of Art, The University of Melbourne, 2014
- Melbourne Art Fair, Royal Exhibition Building, Melbourne, 2002–2014
- Animal Magnetism, Arts Project Australia Gallery, Melbourne, 2014
- Chicago Expo: Fleisher Ollman Gallery, Chicago USA, 2013
- City of Hobart Art Prize, Tasmanian Museum and Art Gallery, TAS, 2013
- Outsiderism, Fleisher Ollman Gallery, Philadelphia, USA, 2013
- World In My Eyes, C3 Gallery, Abbotsford, Melbourne, 2013
- At the Table, Arts Project Australia, Melbourne, 2013
- Classic Albums, Tanks Art Centre, Cairns, QLD, 2013
- Classic Albums, Arts Project Australia Gallery, Melbourne, 2012
- Framing Gravity, Sydney College of the Arts, SCA Gallery, The University of Sydney, 2011
- The Shilo Project, national touring exhibition, 2009–2011
- Subterranean, Arts Project Australia Gallery, Melbourne, 2011
- Fred, Ginger and Other Stories, Delmar Gallery, Ashfield, 2011
- Belle Arti – Chapman and Bailey Acquisitive 2010 Art Award, national touring exhibition, 2009–2010
- Human Nature, Alan Lane Community Gallery : Warrnambool Art Gallery, 2010
- Portrait Exchange, Arts Project Australia Gallery, Melbourne, 2010
- Snapshot, ACGA Gallery, Federation Square, Melbourne, 2009
- Pictures of You, Arts Project Australia Gallery, Melbourne, 2009
- Location Location Location! Arts Project Australia Gallery, Melbourne, 2009
- Licorice Allsorts, King Street Gallery on William, Sydney, 2009
- Pearls of Arts Project Australia: The Stuart Purves Collection, national touring exhibition, 2007–2009
- Short Stories, Tall Tales and the Way They Wore Them, Arts Project Australia Gallery, Melbourne, 2008
- Without Borders: Outsider Art in an Antipodean Context, Monash University Museum of Art, Melbourne and Campbelltown Arts Centre, Sydney, 2008
- Salon de Refusés, SH Irvin Gallery, Sydney, 2008
- Yours, Mine and Ours: 50 Years of ABC TV, Penrith Regional Gallery & The Lewers Bequest, 2006
- Australian Outsiders, Jack Fischer Gallery, California, USA, 2006
- Leo Cussen with Selected Artists, Australian Galleries, Collingwood, 2005
- Double Take, Arts Project Australia Gallery, Melbourne, 2005
- Sydney Art on Paper Fair, Byron Kennedy Hall, Sydney, 2005
- Outsider Art Fair, New York, United States, hosted by the Phyllis Kind Gallery, New York, 2005
- Home Sweet Home: Works from the Peter Fay Collection, international touring exhibition (Australia and New Zealand), 2003–2005
- Printed Matter, Arts Project Australia Gallery, Melbourne, 2004
- A Sense of Place, Arts Project Australia Gallery, Melbourne, 2003
- Fair Game: Art & Sport, Response Gallery, National Gallery of Victoria, Melbourne, 2003
- Chic, Arts Project Australia Gallery, Melbourne, 2002
- What about you, Monkey Bum? Arts Project Australia Gallery, Melbourne, 2002

== Publications ==
- Lisa Reid: The Devil's in the Detail, exhibition catalogue, Arts Project Australia, Melbourne, 2015, ISBN 9780958665995
- Art Monthly Australia, Issue #209, May 2008

== Collections ==
- National Gallery of Australia, Canberra
