= SMART Infrastructure Facility =

Coordinates: 34.4063°S 150.8813°E

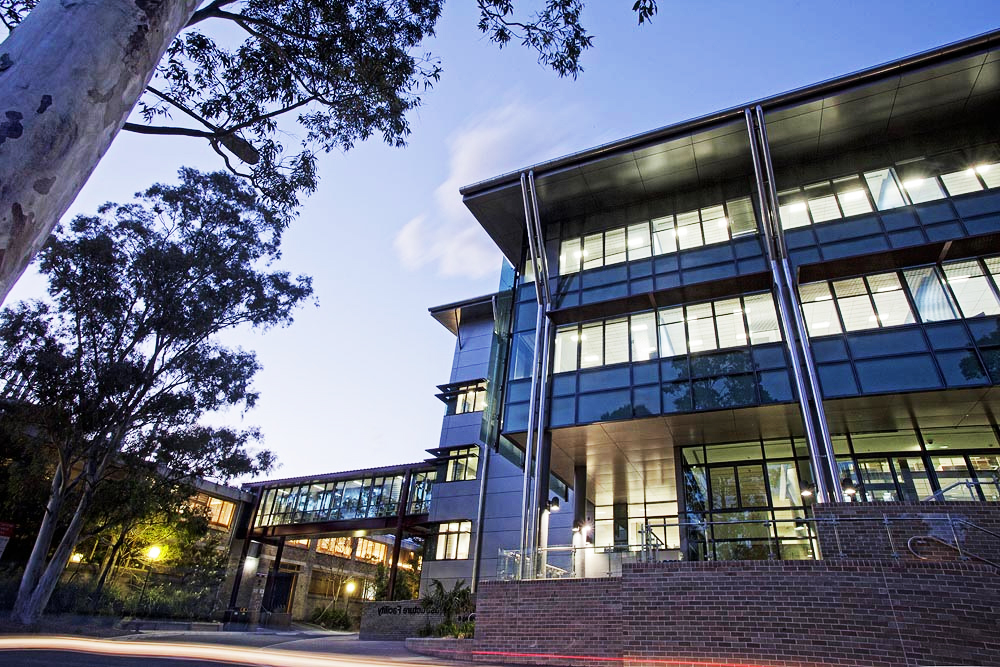
- Established: 2010
- Field of research: Infrastructure
- Staff: 150 research
- Students: 200 postgraduate
- Address: Building 6, University of Wollongong, Northfields Avenue
- Location: Wollongong, New South Wales, Australia
- Campus: 12,000 m^{2} (130,000 sq ft)
- Affiliations: University of Wollongong
- Website: smart.uow.edu.au

SMART Infrastructure Facility (SMART) is a research institution in Wollongong, Australia. SMART is an acronym for "simulation, modelling, analysis, research and teaching". It opened in 2011 as Australia's first multi-disciplinary applied infrastructure research and training facility.

== History ==
The facility was created through funding from:

- $35 million from the Australian federal government (through the 2007 the Higher Education Endowment Fund
- $10 million through RailCorp;
- $16 million from the University of Wollongong;
- Approx $800,000 from state government authorities (Queensland Rail, Integral Energy and Geoscience Australia), industry (BlueScope, Cisco Systems Australia and Cognos), and other research bodies (Australian Bureau of Statistics and CSIRO)

== Research groups ==
SMART's commissioned research program ranges from big data on cities, economic analysis and scenario planning tools for land use and transport. They investigate how infrastructure can be better designed, delivered and managed to meet the changing needs of the society over the long term.

Research groups contribute to specific commissioned research projects, and promote academic key performance indicators such as publications, HDR students and competitive research grants. Commissioned research projects and consultancies fund the facility through revenue and strategic partnerships.

The seven research groups consist of:

- Advanced Geomatics for Regional and Urban Planning
- Applying System of Systems Methodologies
- Computer Simulation for Sustainable Transport Systems
- Computational Intelligence for Optimal Decision and Operation
- Economics and Governance
- Geo-social Intelligence for Urban Resilience and Liveability
- Social Simulation for Demographic Analysis and Transitions

Henry Ergas is a professor there.
