= Ricky Swallow =

Australian sculptor (born c. 1974)

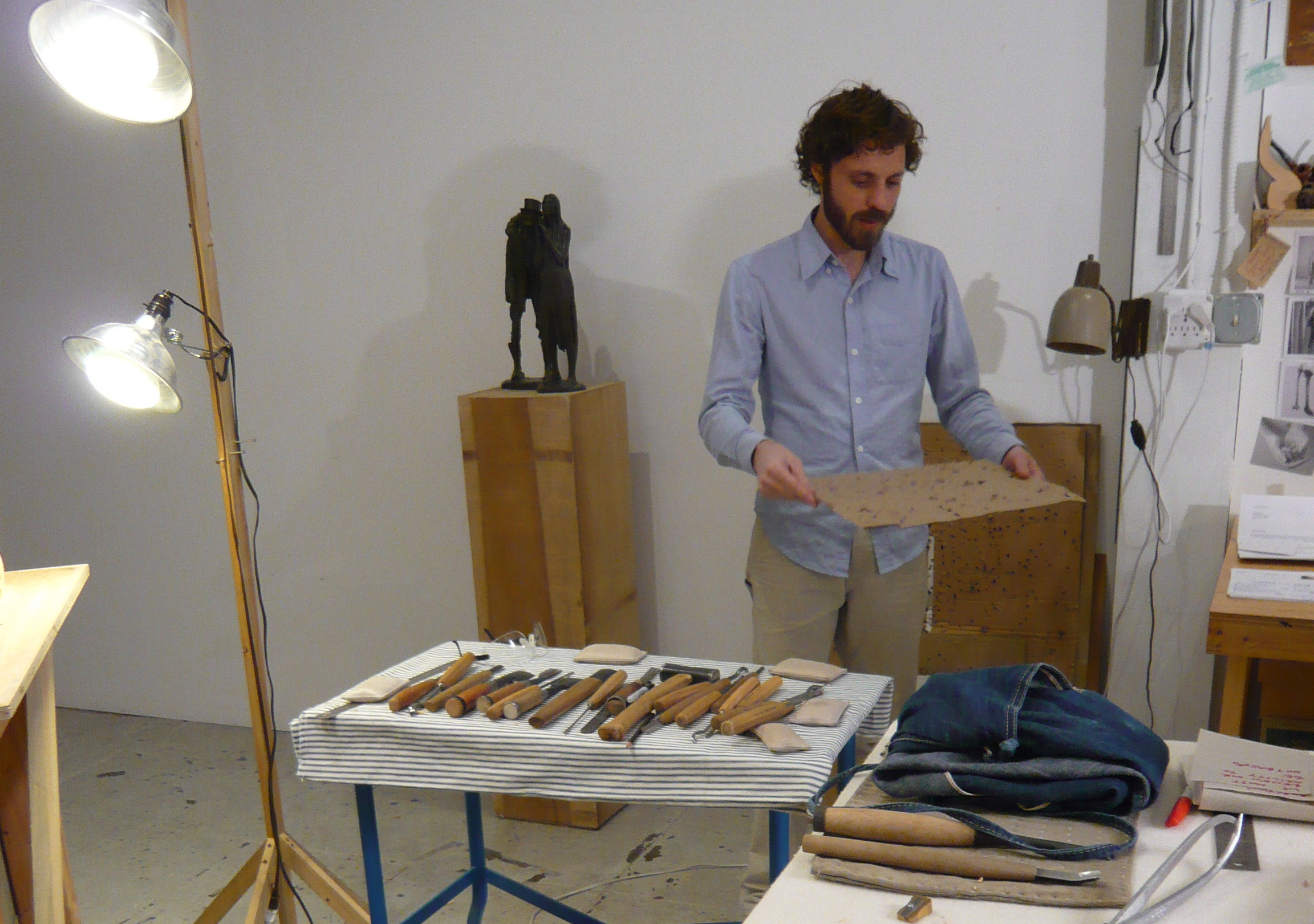
- Ricky Swallow in his Los Angeles studio, 2009
- Born: Ricky Swallow; 1974; San Remo, Victoria, Australia
- Known for: Sculpture
- Movement: postmodern
- Website: rickyswallow.com

Ricky Swallow is an Australian sculptor (born in San Remo, Victoria in 1974), who lives and works in Los Angeles. He creates detailed pieces and installations in a variety of media, often utilising objects of everyday life as well as the body (bones etc.). He studied at the Victorian College of the Arts. He won the Contempora 5 Prize in Melbourne at the age of 25 in 1999. He was later selected to be the Australian representative at the 2005 Venice Biennale with This Time Another Year.

== See also ==
- Art of Australia
