= Chris Mason (artist) =

Australian artist (born 1976)

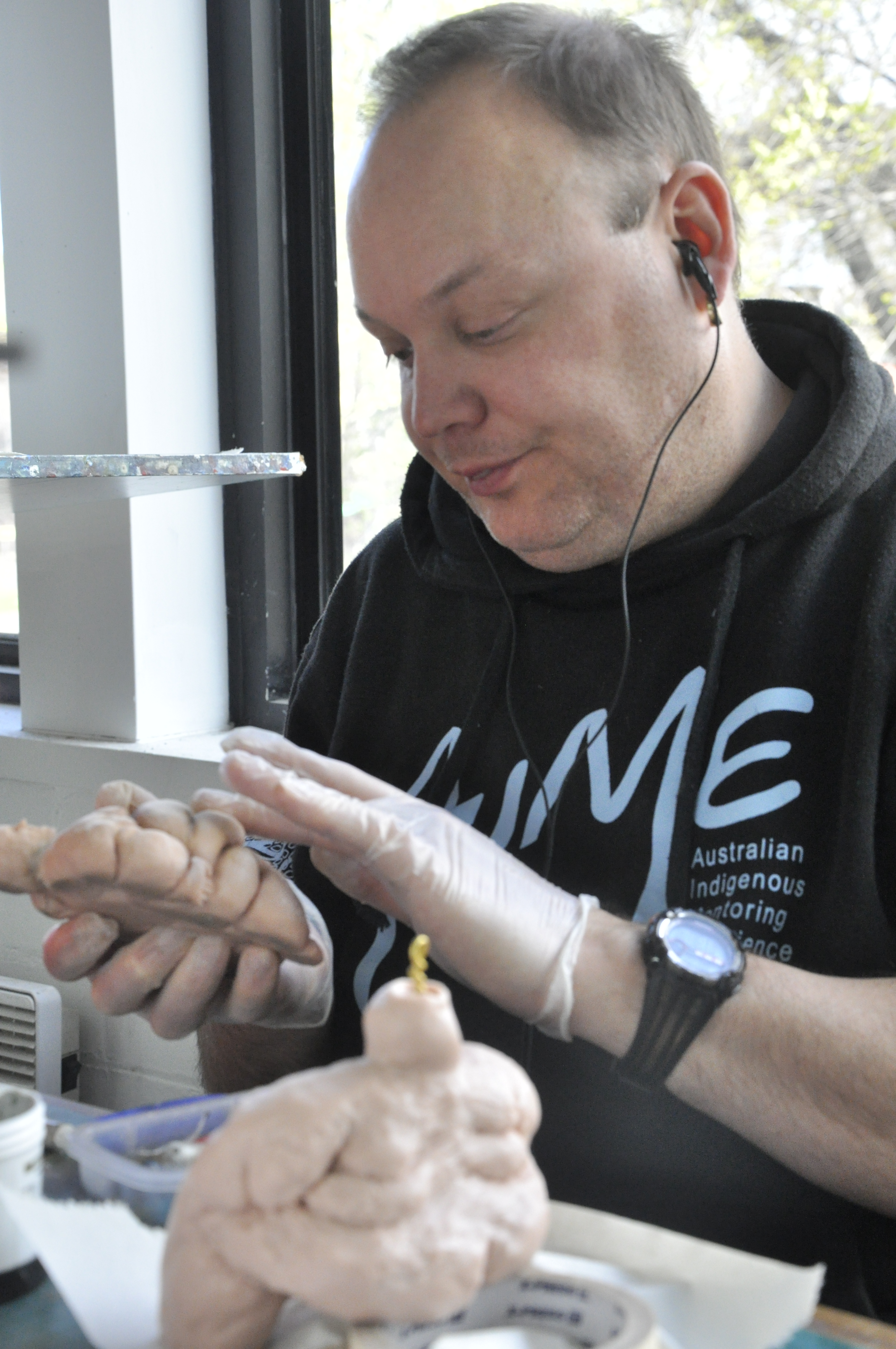
Australian artist Chris Mason.

Chris Mason (born 1976) is an Australian artist. Mason resides in Melbourne. His work is held in several public collections, including those of the National Gallery of Australia and the State Library of Victoria.

== Career, themes and style ==
Both Mason's lack of formal training and autism have identified him as one of the key figures within the Outsider Art category in Australia. This categorisation is confirmed by his repeated inclusion in Outsider Art exhibitions and fairs, both in Australia and in the USA. However, in recent years his work has also achieved success in more conventional art institutions and has been acquired for major collections at the National Gallery of Australia and the State Library of Victoria.

Mason cites as a major influence the artist Ron Mueck, with whom his work shares the Hyperrealist style that emerged from photorealism, and whose subject matter is derived from reinterpretations of photographic imagery. His signature depictions of voluptuous women are sourced from images collected from the Internet and various publications; in his search for reference material he aims for women whose dimensions result in the figures being "almost as tall as they are wide," dimensions which he views as "perfect" and "archetypal." In recent years Mason has developed a tendency towards smaller-scale ceramic pieces and has expressed a strong interest in pursuing taxidermy in his work, which APA Studio Manager James McDonald describes as "a logical next step." Mason has exhibited at Gertrude Contemporary, c3 Contemporary Art Space and Linden New Art. He has also held a solo exhibition at Sydney's prestigious Darren Knight Gallery in 2014.

== Publications ==
Anne Stonehouse, So Far… Eight Artists / Eight Stories, Arts Project Australia, Melbourne, 2014. ISBN 9780958665971

Sim Luttin & Melissa Petty, Wild Lands, exhibition catalogue, Linden New Art, Melbourne, 2016

== Solo exhibitions ==
Chris Mason Solo, Darren Knight Gallery, Sydney, 2014

Michelle, Arts Project Australia Gallery, Melbourne, 2007

The Chris Mason Show, Arts Project Australia Gallery, Melbourne, 2002

== Selected group exhibitions ==
Clay: it’s a matter of substance, Arts Project Australia, Melbourne, 2016

Wild Lands, Linden New Art, St Kilda, Melbourne, 2016

Manningham Victorian Ceramic Award 2015, Manningham Art Gallery, 2015

Deakin University Contemporary Small Sculpture Award, Deakin University Melbourne, 2015

That’s Funny, Arts Project Australia Gallery, Melbourne, 2015

Melbourne Art Fair 2014, Royal Exhibition Building, Melbourne, 2000 - 2014

Renegades: Outsider Art, Moree Plains Gallery, national touring exhibition, 2013 - Into the Vault and Out of the Box, Arts Project Australia Gallery, Melbourne, 2014

Turning the Page, Gallery 101, Ottawa, Ontario, Canada, 2014

Manningham Victorian Ceramic Art Award, Manningham Art Gallery, Melbourne, 2013

Repeat. Restate… Reiterate, Arts Project Australia Gallery, Melbourne, 2013

Outsiderism Fleisher Ollman Gallery, Philapelphia, USA, 2013

World In My Eyes, C3 Gallery, Melbourne, 2013

In the making, Arts Project Australia Gallery, Melbourne, 2012

This Sensual World, Arts Project Australia Gallery, Melbourne, 2011

Erotica, James Makin Gallery, Collingwood, Melbourne, 2011

Portrait Exchange, Arts Project Australia Gallery, Melbourne, 2010

Pacifica, Gallery Impaire, Paris, France, 2010

The Agents, Gertrude Contemporary Art Spaces, Melbourne, 2010

Off the Edge: Ceramics Triennale, Chrissie Cotter Gallery, Sydney

Reinvention: Creativity and Self Identity, Bundoora Homestead Art Centre, Melbourne

Location Location Location! Arts Project Australia Gallery, Melbourne

Pearls of Arts Project Australia: Stuart Purves Collection, national touring exhibition, 2007 - 2009

Wild Things, Arts Project Australia Gallery, Melbourne, 2008

[null In Everyone’s Company], Arts Project Australia Gallery, Melbourne, 2006

Leo Cussen with Selected Artists, Australian Galleries, Collingwood, 2005

South of the Border, Arts Project Australia Gallery, Melbourne, 2005

Sydney Art on Paper Fair, Byron Kennedy Hall, Sydney, 2005

Hitch a Ride, Arts Project Australia Gallery, Melbourne, 2005

Outsider Art Fair, New York, United States. Hosted by the Phyllis Kind Gallery, New York, 2005

Home Sweet Home: Works from the Peter Fay Collection, National Gallery of Australia Travelling exhibition (Australia and New Zealand), 2004 – 2005

2nd Annual Intuit Show of Folk and Outsider Art, Chicago, United States, hosted by the Phyllis Kind Gallery, New York, 2004

Visual Disobedience, Arts Project Australia Gallery, Melbourne, 2004

Printed Matter, Arts Project Australia Gallery, Melbourne, 2004

From vacuum cleaning to Plumpers Dance Party, Arts Project Australia Gallery, Melbourne, 2002

Five Artists From Arts Project Australia, Australian Galleries Works on Paper, Sydney, 2000

Six Artists from Arts Project Australia, Australian Galleries Works on Paper, Sydney, 1999

Profile, Manningham City Gallery, Melbourne, 1999

Transport, Arts Project Australia Gallery, Melbourne, 1998

The Autistic Eye, Vic Health Access Gallery, National Gallery of Victoria, 1998

Off the Wall, Arts Project Australia Gallery, Melbourne, 1998

== Awards ==
Manningham Victorian Ceramic Award 2015, Manningham Art Gallery, Finalist

2015 Deakin University Small Sculpture Award, Deakin University, Finalist

People’s Choice Award, Moving Galleries, Observerance exhibition, Melbourne, 2012

== Collections ==
Chris Mason's work is represented in National Gallery of Australia, State Library of Victoria, Stuart Purves Collection and private collections.
