= Henry Ergas =

Australian economist (born 1952)

Henry Isaac Ergas AO (born 22 August 1952) is an Australian economist. He has had academic teaching posts as well as working for private consulting firms, and has had various appointments on governmental and other panels and boards.

== Early life and education ==
Henry Isaac Ergas was born on 22 August 1952. He is a descendant of Sephardic Jews in Spain.

He received a first-class honours B.A. in economics at Sussex University and a Master of Economics with high distinction from the University of Queensland.

== Career ==
Ergas has taught at Harvard Kennedy School at Harvard University, the Centre for Research in Network Economics and Communications at the University of Auckland, Monash University and at the École nationale de la statistique et de l'administration économique (ENSAE Paris).

He was managing director of Network Economics Consulting Group (NECG) from 1996 until 2004, when it was acquired by CRA International where he became vice president and regional head, Asia Pacific.

In 2004 he was appointed adjunct professor at the School of Economics, National University of Singapore.

From 2009 to 2016, he was professor of infrastructure economics at the SMART Infrastructure Facility at the University of Wollongong.

He also worked at the OECD and the Australian Trade Practices Commission.

== Other activities and appointments ==
Ergas is a columnist for The Australian newspaper.

He chaired the Australian Intellectual Property and Competition Review Committee set up by the Australian Government in 1999 to review Australia's intellectual property laws as they relate to competition policy.

Ergas was an independent contributor to a paper submitted to the U.S. Federal Communications Commission in 2010, which cautioned against imposing regulations that, while aimed at net neutrality, may cause costs that exceed the expected benefits.

Other appointments include:

- 1997 – Member, Advisory Panel on Telecommunications Reform to the Minister for Communications and the Arts, Australia
- 1998 – Member, Commissione Scientifica, Telecom Italia, Rome, Italy
- 1999 – Chairman, Intellectual Property and Competition Review Committee, Attorney-General's Department, Australia
- 2001 – Lay member, High Court of New Zealand
- 2002 – Editorial board, The Review of Network Economics
- 2004 – Member, Australian Centre of Regulatory Economics (ACORE) Advisory Board
- 2005 – Member, Prime Minister's Taskforce on Export and Infrastructure
- 2009 – Senior Economic Adviser, Deloitte Australia
- 2013 – Member, NBN (National Broadband Network) Cost-Benefit Analysis and Review of Regulation Panel of Experts

== Honours ==
In 2004 Ergas was received into the Ordre national du Mérite.

In the 2016 Australia Day Honours, Ergas was made an Officer of the Order of Australia for "distinguished service to infrastructure economics, and to higher education, to public policy development and review, and as a supporter of emerging artists".

== Selected publications ==
- 1984 – "Why Do Some Countries Innovate More than Others?", Centre for European Policy Studies, CEPS Papers No. 5. Also available at https://ssrn.com/abstract=1430184 doi:10.2139/ssrn.1430184
- 1987 – "Does Technology Policy Matter?" in Technology and Global Industry: Companies and Nations in the World Economy, National Academy of Engineering of the United States, National Academies Press, Washington DC. Reprinted in Stephan, Paula E. and David B. Audretsch, (eds.), in The Economics of Science and Innovation, vol. 2, Elgar Reference Collection, International Library of Critical Writings in Economics, vol. 117, Cheltenham, U.K. and Northampton, Massachusetts, pp. 438–492. Also available at https://ssrn.com/abstract=1428246 doi:10.2139/ssrn.1428246.
- 2008 – Wrong Number: Resolving Australia's Telecommunications Impasse, Allen & Unwin, Sydney.
- 2010 – "New policies create a new politics: issues of institutional design in climate change policy", Australian Journal of Agricultural and Resource Economics, 26 April doi:10.1111/j.1467-8489.2010.00484.x
- 2011 – "Some Economic Aspects of Mining Taxation" (with Prof. Jonathan Pincus and Dr. Mark Harrison) Economic Papers of the Economic Society of Australia, 29(4).
- 2013 – (with Prof. Jonathan Pincus) "Have Mining Royalties been beneficial to Australia?", Economic Papers of the Economic Society of Australia, 33(1).
- 2015 – (with Prof. Jonathan Pincus), "Infrastructure and Colonial Socialism", in The Cambridge Economic History of Australia, eds. Simon Ville and Glenn Withers, Cambridge University Press, Cambridge, Massachusetts.
- 2016 – "Tocqueville, Hancock and the Sense of History" in "Only in Australia. The History, Politics and Economics of Australian Exceptionalism", Oxford University Press.
- 2016 – (with Prof. Jonathan Pincus), "The Wealth of the Nation" in Menzies, the Shaping of Modern Australia, ed. J. R. Nethercote, Conor Court publishing in association with the Menzies Research Centre.
