= 2013 Australia Day Honours =

The 2013 Australia Day Honours were announced on 26 January 2013 by the Governor-General of Australia, Quentin Bryce.

The Australia Day Honours, the first major honours list for a calendar year, are announced on Australia Day (26 January) every year, with the other being the Queen's Birthday Honours which are announced on the second Monday in June.

† indicates an award given posthumously.

== Order of Australia ==
=== Companion (AC) ===
==== General Division ====
Order of Australia General Division ribbon

Order of Australia Military Division ribbon

Recipient	Citation	Notes
The Honourable Alexander Downer	For eminent service to the Parliament of Australia through the advancement of international relations and foreign policy, particularly in the areas of security, trade and humanitarian aid, and to the community of South Australia	
The Reverend Professor James Haire AM	For eminent service to the community through international leadership in ecumenical and interfaith dialogue, the promotion of religious reconciliation, inclusion and peace, and as a theologian.	
Professor Brian Schmidt FRS	For eminent service as a global science leader in the field of physics through research in the study of astronomy and astrophysics, contributions to scientific bodies and the promotion of science education.	
The Honourable Tom Uren AO	For eminent service to the community, particularly through contributions to the welfare of veterans, improved medical education in Vietnam and the preservation of sites of heritage and environmental significance.	

=== Officer (AO) ===
==== General Division ====
Recipient	Citation	Notes
The Honourable Justice James Leslie Allsop	For distinguished service to the judiciary and the law, as a judge, through reforms to equity and access, and through contributions to the administration of maritime law and legal education.	
Professor John Robert Argue	For distinguished service to engineering through contributions to the development of storm water management and technology as a researcher and academic.	
Robert Atkinson APM	For distinguished service to policing and to the community of Queensland, through leadership in law enforcement, community and cultural engagement, improved service delivery and contributions to professional development.	
Nicholas Begakis AM	For distinguished service to business and commerce in South Australia through leadership in the food industry and the development of international trade, and to the community.	
Carolyn Louise Bond	For distinguished service to the community through the protection of consumers, particularly in relation to financial services, as an advocate and counsellor and through the provision of legal assistance services.	
Lynelle Jann Briggs	For distinguished service to public administration, particularly through leadership in the development of public service performance and professionalism.	
Professor Roger William Byard PSM	For distinguished service to medicine in the field of forensic pathology as an academic, researcher and practitioner and through contributions to professional committees and organisations.	
Professor Robert Graham Clark	For distinguished service to science and technology through leadership and governance of the scientific community of the Australian Defence Force and through contributions to quantum computing and nanotechnology.	
Professor Diego De Leo	For distinguished service to medicine in the field of psychiatry as a researcher and through the creation of national and international strategies for suicide prevention.	
Paul William Dyer	For distinguished service to the performing arts, particularly orchestral music as a director, conductor and musician, through the promotion of educational programs and support for emerging artists.	
Jill Gallagher	For distinguished service to the Indigenous community of Victoria, through leadership in the area of health and contributions to cultural, welfare and professional organisations.	
Emeritus Professor Robert Donald Goldney	For distinguished service to medicine in the field of psychiatry, as a researcher and academic, through international contributions to the study of suicide and its prevention.	
Richard James Goyder	For distinguished service to business through executive roles and through the promotion of corporate sponsorship of the arts and Indigenous programs, and to the community.	
Professor Peter Gavin Hall	For distinguished service to mathematical science in the field of statistics through international contributions to research, as an academic and mentor, and through leadership of advisory and professional organisations.	
Gregory Neil Hartung OAM	For distinguished service to sport and to people with a disability through contributions to the development and promotion of the paralympic community, particularly in the South Pacific.	
Clive James AM	For distinguished service to literature through contributions to cultural and intellectual heritage, particularly as a writer and poet.	
James Carvel McColl	For distinguished service to primary industry through policy and strategy advisory roles in the agriculture, fisheries and natural resources sector, and to conservation and the environment.	
Roderick Hamilton McGeoch AM	For distinguished service to the community through contributions to a range of organisations, and to sport, particularly through leadership in securing the Sydney Olympic Games.	
Alistair Murray McLean OAM	For distinguished service to the advancement of Australia's diplomatic, trade and cultural relationships in Asia and for significant leadership and co-ordination roles in the Australian, International and local communities in Japan, following the earthquakes and tsunami of 11 March 2011.	
Peter James McMurtrie	For distinguished service to the community through leadership in the areas of emergency patient care and health service management and contributions to professional organisations.	
Ernestine Bonita Mabo	For distinguished service to the Indigenous community and to human rights as an advocate for the Aboriginal, Torres Strait Islander and South Sea Islander peoples.	
Professor Ralph Nigel Martins	For distinguished service to medicine in the field of psychiatry through leadership in the research into Alzheimer's disease and the development of early diagnosis and treatment programs, and to the community of Perth.	
Dr Colin Douglas Matthews	For distinguished service to reproductive medicine, particularly through the establishment of donor insemination and in vitro fertilisation programs, through contributions to research and as an academic.	
Natalie Miller OAM	For distinguished service to the film industry through promotion of screen culture, as a mentor to emerging film-makers, particularly women, and contributions to advisory and professional organisations.	
Dr Philip James Moors	For distinguished service to conservation and the environment through contributions to the botanical and scientific community and the promotion of Australian flora.	
Hugh Andrew O'Neill	For distinguished service to architecture, through contributions to tertiary education and the fostering of relations with Asia, particularly Indonesia.	
Elaine Janet Paton	For distinguished service to the rural community, particularly as an advocate for the role of women in agriculture and through contributions to educational programs.	
Professor Sally Redman	For distinguished service to public health through leadership in the care of women with breast cancer, contributions to research and higher education and the promotion of relationships between researchers, policy makers and practitioners.	
Professor Marilyn Bernice Renfree	For distinguished service to biology, particularly through leadership in the research into marsupial reproduction, and to the scientific community through contributions to professional organisations.	
Emeritus Professor George Ernest Rogers	For distinguished service to biochemistry through contributions to tertiary education and leadership of research into the molecular structure and growth processes of wool and hair.	
Clive Robert Weeks	For distinguished service to engineering through leadership roles in the development of key civil works projects and through contributions to professional and educational organisations.	
Dr Peter William Weiss AM	For distinguished service to the arts, particularly orchestral music through philanthropic support and advisory roles.	
The Hon Dr Christine Ann Wheeler QC	For distinguished service to the judiciary and the law, through leadership in the administration of justice and contributions to legal education, as a mentor to women, and to the community of Western Australia.	
The Hon Justice Margaret Jean White	For distinguished service to the judiciary and the law, through leadership in administration, contributions to education and law reform, and to the community of Queensland.	
Tony Wurramarrba	For distinguished service to the Indigenous community of the Groote Eylandt Archipelago through leadership and advocacy for improved services and infrastructure.	
Professor Helen Maria Zorbas	For distinguished service to public health through leadership in the delivery of improved information and services to cancer patients and their families and contributions to research and clinical trials.	

==== Military Division ====
Branch	Recipient	Citation	Notes
Navy	Rear Admiral James Goldrick	For distinguished service as Commander, Border Protection Command, Commander, Joint Education and Training, and Commandant of the Australian Defence Force Academy, and for outstanding scholarship in the study of Australian naval history.	
Army	Major General Grant Douglas Cavenagh	For distinguished service to the Australian Defence Force as Commander Joint Logistics and as Head Land Systems Division.	
Army	Major General Paul Fogarty	For distinguished service as Deputy Commander Joint Task Force 633 in Iraq, Director General Personnel - Army and as Head People Capability.	

=== Member (AM) ===
==== General Division ====
Recipient	Citation	Notes
Mitchell David Aanjou	For significant service to optometry and public health, particularly in the Indigenous community, as a researcher, clinician and educator.	
The Honourable John Joseph Aquilina	For significant service to the Parliament of New South Wales, and to the community.	
Howard Bamsey PSM	For significant service to public administration, particularly in the area of climate change and energy efficiency.	
Emeritus Professor Gordon Alfred Barclay	For significant service to tertiary education in New South Wales, particularly in the field of chemistry.	
Emeritus Professor Allan Douglas Barton †	For significant service to accounting and economics as an author, researcher, educator and mentor.	
Dean Bryan Barton-Smith	For significant service to the sport of athletics, and to people who are deaf or hard of hearing through the development of sport and recreation opportunities.	
Dr Warwick Carl Bateman OAM	For significant service to youth through administrative and leadership roles with the Scouting movement in Australia.	
Dr Brian Michael Boettcher	For significant service to psychiatry as a clinician and educator.	
Associate Professor Stuart Leigh Boland	For significant service to medicine through leadership roles in professional organisations, and as a surgeon and educator.	
The Reverend Emeritus Professor Gary Donald Bouma	For significant service to sociology as an academic, to interfaith dialogue, and to the Anglican Church of Australia.	
Robert Clements Brown	For significant service to the superannuation and funds management industry.	
Dr Gavan John Butler	For significant service to economics and political science as an academic, researcher and educator.	
Professor William Edward Cartwright	For significant service to cartography and geospatial science as an academic, researcher and educator.	
Paul Cattermole	For significant service to the community of the Northern Territory through the planning and management of major sporting and cultural events.	
Donald William Challen	For significant service to economics, and to public administration in Tasmania in the treasury and finance sector.	
Associate Professor Andrew Donald Cochrane	For significant service to adolescent and adult congenital heart disease as a clinician, researcher and educator, and through humanitarian and philanthropic contributions.	
Keith Osborne Collett	For significant service to sustainable land management practices and water conservation.	
Dr Brian Leslie Cornish OAM RFD ED	For significant service to medicine as an orthopaedic surgeon, to forestry and conservation, and to the community.	
Ian Thomas Croser	For significant service to science through electronic communication and radar and related technologies.	
Associate Professor Jack Cross	For significant service to tertiary education in South Australia, particularly in the field of art and design, and to Indigenous education.	
Ewen Graham Crouch	For significant service to the law as a contributor to legal professional organisations, and to the community through executive roles with Mission Australia.	
The Right Reverend Andrew William Curnow	For significant service to the Anglican Church of Australia through leadership roles.	
Dr Marianne Josephine Dacy	For significant service to interfaith dialogue, and to the Congregation of Our Lady of Sion.	
Professor Stephen Misha Davis	For significant service to medicine in the field of neurology.	
Grant Raymond De Fries	For significant service to youth through administrative and leadership roles with the Scouting movement in New South Wales.	
Margaret Ann Devlin	For significant service to youth, particularly through the Guiding movement in Victoria, and to the sport of women's hockey.	
Edward Donnelly	For significant service to the community through leadership in the promotion of the health and welfare of men through the Australian Men's Shed Association.	
Professor Michael Andrew Dopita	For significant service to science in the field of astronomy and astrophysics.	
John Doust	For significant service to the building and construction industry through executive and leadership roles.	
Dr Alan William Duncan	For significant service to medicine in the field of paediatric intensive care as a clinician and educator.	
John Robert Dunkley	For significant service to the exploration, science and conservation of caves and karsts.	
Michael John Dysart	For significant service to architecture.	
Dr Mark Francis Ellis	For significant service to medicine in the field of ophthalmology, and to eye health in Indonesia and Timor-Leste.	
Bruce Neil Esplin	For significant service to the emergency management sector in Victoria.	
Dr David Alexander Evans	For significant service to science and innovation through commercialising and developing new technologies.	
Kerrie Margaret Eyers	For significant service to psychology, particularly through mental health program administration.	
Graeme David Fair	For significant service to the sport of tennis through a range of administrative and leadership roles, and to the community.	
Elizabeth Fisher	For significant service to the community through organisations and advisory bodies that promote social justice and the interests of women.	
Dr Hardinge Guy Fitzhardinge	For significant service to conservation and the sustainable management of threatened species, and to the agricultural industry.	
Anne Fogarty	For significant service to equity, access and advancement of education in Western Australia.	
The Honourable Robert Clive Fordham	For significant service to the Parliament of Victoria, to education, to the Anglican Church in Australia, and to tourism and economic development.	
Emeritus Professor Philip Jack Foreman	For significant service to tertiary education, particularly in the area of special education, and to people with a disability.	
David Anthony Forsyth	For significant service to the aviation industry through a range of administrative and leadership roles.	
Professor Emeritus Maurice William French	For significant service to tertiary education through a range of leadership roles, to the preservation of local history, and to the study of the humanities.	
Christine Mary Gee	For significant service to international relations and the people of Nepal, particularly through the provision of education, health and environmental programs.	
John Aubrey Gibson †	For significant service to international relations as an advocate for human rights.	
Professor Malcolm George Gillies	For significant service to tertiary education through leadership roles, and to the humanities, particularly as a scholar of musicology.	
Eric John Goodwin	For significant service to the community through educational organisations, and to business.	
Professor Ian Charles Goulter	For significant service to tertiary education, particularly through rural and regional engagement.	
Dr David Leslie Grantham PSM	For significant service to public health in the area of occupational hygiene.	
Laurence Francis Harkin	For significant service to the community, particularly through the care and protection of people with a disability.	
Russell John Hawkins	For significant service to the community through leadership roles in the development of facilities for the support of parents, children and the aged.	
Ronald Kenneth Heinrich	For significant service to the law, and to the legal profession.	
The Reverend Harry John Herbert	For significant service to the community through leadership and advocacy roles in the area of social justice and welfare.	
The Reverend Roger Adrian Herft	For significant service to the Anglican Church of Australia through leadership roles in ecumenical and interfaith relations and advocacy for social justice.	
Mary "Louise" Herron	For significant service to the performing arts through leadership and advisory roles.	
Jill Lesley Hickson	For significant service to the community through leadership roles in organisations supporting the arts, culture, tourism, the environment and education.	
Clive Perry Hildebrand	For significant service to business, particularly through leadership in the promotion of international relations and the protection of the sugar industry, and to tertiary education.	
John Kinloch Hindmarsh	For significant service to building and construction in the Australian Capital Territory, and to business.	
Michael Hintze	For significant service to the community through philanthropic contributions to organisations supporting the arts, health, and education.	
Philip James Hoffmann	For significant service to the travel and tourism industry through contributions to professional associations and the development of training standards.	
Adjunct Professor David Anthony Hood	For significant service to environmental engineering as an educator and researcher, through contributions to professional organisations, and to public awareness of sustainability.	
Professor William Roy Jackson	For significant service to science in the field of organic chemistry as an educator and researcher.	
Kenneth John Johnson	For significant service to the development of water resources for irrigation and hydroelectricity as an engineer.	
Stephen John Jones	For significant service to local government and the community of the Lockyer Valley, particularly in relation to the Queensland floods in 2010 and 2011.	
Andrew Gabriel Kaldor	For significant service to the arts, particularly orchestral music through advisory roles and philanthropy.	
Margaret Dean "Meg" Larkin	For significant service to the arts as a leader and advocate of regional organisations.	
Geoffrey William Law	For significant service to conservation and the environment, particularly in Tasmania.	
Dr Michael John Llewellyn-Smith	For significant service to local government through the promotion of city and state relations and planning.	
The Honourable Dr Jane Diane Lomax-Smith	For significant service to the Parliament and the community of South Australia.	
Malcolm William Long	For significant service to the performing arts and to the broadcasting and communications industries.	
Sandy Charles Longworth	For significant service to engineering through leadership and advisory roles in research, training and professional organisations.	
Dr David Alistair Lonie	For significant service to psychiatry, particularly in the field of infant and adolescent mental health.	
Dr Isla Ellen Lonie †	For significant service to medicine in the field of psychiatry, and to professional associations.	
Errol James McGarry	For significant service to science and technology, particularly through research and development in the field of chemistry.	
Sandra Veronica McPhee	For significant service to business and to the community through leadership and advisory roles.	
John David Maddock	For significant service to vocational education and training, and to the sport of basketball.	
David William Marchant	For significant service to the rail industry through national structural reform and infrastructure upgrades.	
Associate Professor Jenó Emil Marosszeky	For significant service to rehabilitation medicine, and through contributions to people with arthritis.	
Dr Ian William Marshall AE	For significant service to the community of Queensland as a medical practitioner and through contributions to the cattle industry and rural education.	
The Honourable Justice Glenn Charles Martin	For significant service to the law, particularly through contributions to the Australian Bar Association, and to the community of Queensland.	
James Edward Maxwell	For significant service to sport, particularly cricket, as a commentator, and to the community.	
Wayne Ashley Merton	For significant service to the Parliament of New South Wales, and to the community.	
Robert Gordon Miller	For significant service to the community, particularly through contributions to people with a disability.	
Dr Christopher Mitchell	For significant service to medicine as a general practitioner through leadership roles in clinical practice, education and professional organisations.	
David Edward Mitchell	For significant service to conservation and the environment as a volunteer and volunteer advocate.	
Jill Elizabeth Morgan	For significant service to the promotion of multicultural and Indigenous art through leadership roles in arts organisations.	
Professor Jonathan Mark Morris	For significant service to maternal and infant health as a clinician, educator, patient advocate and researcher.	
Christopher John Moseley	For significant service to linguistics through the preservation of Indigenous and endangered languages.	
Jacob George Mye MBE, OAM †	For significant service to the Indigenous communities of the Torres Strait.	
The Reverend Dr Anthony George Nancarrow	For significant service to the Uniting Church in South Australia.	
Juliana Ampofowaa Nkrumah	For significant service to the community, particularly the welfare of women and refugees.	
Linda Jane O'Brien	For significant service to secondary education through leadership and innovative practices, and to the community.	
Timothy John O'Brien	For significant service to the community of Berri, South Australia.	
Julien William O'Connell	For significant service to the community, and to the Catholic Church through leadership roles within health and governance services.	
Francis Michael O'Halloran	For significant service to business through leadership in the insurance industry and the promotion of corporate philanthropy.	
Mary Anne O'Loughlin	For significant service to public administration through the development of social policies, the reform of federal financial relations and government services.	
Tania Palmer	For significant service to the community, particularly street children and families in Cambodia, through the Green Gecko Project.	
George Papadopoulos	For significant service to the multicultural community of Victoria through the development of public policy, programs and services.	
Dr Nicholas George Pappas	For significant service to the sport of rugby league football, to the arts, and to the Greek-Australian community.	
Neil Perry	For significant service to the community as a benefactor of and fundraiser for charities and as a chef and restaurateur.	
Jimmy Viet Tuan Pham	For significant service to the community, particularly children in Vietnam, through KOTO International.	
Associate Professor Jonathan Phillips	For significant service to mental health as a forensic psychiatrist, particularly through contributions to professional organisations.	
Norma Margaret Plummer	For significant service to the sport of netball as a coach and representative player.	
Robin Andrew Poke	For significant service to the sport of rowing and the Olympic movement as an administrator, journalist and author.	
Ann Kathleen Porter	For significant service to people who are deaf or hard of hearing through executive and advocacy roles.	
Emeritus Professor Owen Edward Potter	For significant service to chemical engineering through leadership in the areas of education, research and development, and to the Catholic Church.	
Alan Nalder Powell	For significant service to the community of South Australia through governance of welfare and church organisations and as a philanthropist.	
Dr Jan Desma Pratt	For significant service to child health nursing through leadership in the area of professional development.	
Dr David Anthony Rand	For significant service to science and technological development in the area of energy storage, particularly rechargeable batteries.	
Professor Paul Murray Redmond	For significant service to the law through contributions to legal education and professional bodies, and to the community.	
Professor Bruce William Robinson	For significant service to medicine in the area of research into asbestos-related cancers, and to the community, particularly through support to fathers.	
Professor Abdullah Saeed	For significant service to tertiary education in the field of Islamic studies, and to the community, particularly through the promotion of interfaith dialogue.	
Antonino Schiavello	For significant service to business, particularly in the manufacturing and construction industries, and to the community of Victoria.	
Janine Betty Schmidt	For significant service to the promotion of library services and information sciences, particularly through the development of electronic access initiatives.	
Emeritus Professor Steven Schwartz	For significant service to tertiary education, to the community, and to mental health.	
Kathryn Shauna Selby	For significant service to the arts as a concert pianist and performer of chamber music.	
Professor Dinesh Selva	For significant service to ophthalmology and visual sciences as an academic, clinician and researcher and through contributions to professional organisations.	
Professor Peter Allan Silburn	For significant service to medicine as a neurologist, particularly in the treatment of neurodegenerative diseases.	
Professor David Owen Sillence	For significant service to medicine in the field of clinical genetics.	
Professor Anne Simmons	For significant service to biomedical engineering, as an academic and administrator.	
Dr Michael Alexander Smith	For significant service to archaeological scholarship, particularly of the Australian desert regions.	
Professor Roger Smith	For significant service to medical research and development in the Hunter region and in the field of maternal health.	
Graham Joseph Smorgon	For significant service to business, and to the community of Victoria.	
Emeritus Professor Richard Speare	For significant service to medical and biological research through leadership roles in the areas of public health and wildlife conservation.	
Graham George Spurling ED	For significant service to business, and to the community of South Australia.	
Emeritus Professor Robert Lynton Stable	For significant service to the community of Queensland through innovative and strategic management in the areas of tertiary education and health.	
Jock Hewett Statton OAM	For significant service to the veteran community of South Australia.	
Susan Winston Talbot	For significant service to international relations, particularly through promotion of the arts.	
Benedict Taylor	For significant service to the Indigenous community of Western Australia through contributions to a range of social justice and humanitarian rights issues.	
Mark Tedeschi QC	For significant service to the law as a prosecutor, and to photography	
Robert Bain Thomas	For significant service to the community of New South Wales through contributions to library governance, and to business.	
Gianfraco Tomasi	For significant service to business through leadership roles in the electrical contracting industry, and to the community.	
Professor Kristine Margaret Toohey	For significant service to sport as an academic and researcher and through contributions to professional organisations.	
Professor Michael James Toole	For significant service to international health, particularly through leadership in medical research.	
Kenneth Irving Turner	For significant service to tertiary education, particularly in the political history of New South Wales.	
Judy Verlin	For significant service to the community of Ballarat.	
Associate Professor Jitendra Kantilal Vohra	For significant service to medicine in the field of cardiology.	
Alan George Waldron	For significant service to the sport of baseball, and to the community.	
Bruce William Walker	For significant service to the Indigenous communities of remote Australia and the Northern Territory, and to the sport of cricket.	
Emeritus Professor John Gilbert Wallace PSM	For significant service to tertiary education.	
Leigh Robert Whicker	For significant service to the sport of Australian rules football in South Australia.	
Mary-Louise Williams	For significant service to the museum sector and the preservation of maritime history.	
Lynette Robyn Willox	For significant service to people with a disability in Western Australia.	
Bethia "Beth" Wilson	For significant service to the community of Victoria through the provision of dispute resolution in the area of health services.	
Yvonne Ethel Wilson	For significant service to the community of Griffith, particularly through contributions to the protection of women and children.	
Bill Wood	For significant service to the community and the Legislative Assembly of the Australian Capital Territory.	
Dr Glenda Kaye Wood	For significant service to medicine in the field of dermatology.	
Emeritus Professor Neville David Yeomans	For significant service to tertiary education, research and clinical practice in the field of medicine.	
Kenneth Hudson Youdale DFC, OAM	For significant service to the community, particularly as an advocate for people affected by thalidomide.	
Derek Bernard Young	For significant service to the community of Victoria through contributions to the performing arts and higher education, and to philanthropy.	
Dr Jane Louise Zimmerman	For significant service to the community as an advocate and promoter of the status and health of women.	

==== Military Division ====
Branch	Recipient	Citation	Notes
Navy	Captain Jonathan David Sadleir	For exceptional performance of duties as the Director Navy Continuous Improvement, Commanding Officer HMAS Parramatta and as Staff Officer Global Operations.	
Army	Major General Stephen Julian Day DSC	For exceptional service to the Australian Defence Force as Commander of the 7th Brigade and Head Joint Capability Coordination.	
Army	Lieutenant Colonel Michael Edward Garraway	For exceptional service in the field of officer career management in 2009 and as Commanding Officer, 7th Battalion, the Royal Australian Regiment, from 2010 to 2012.	
Army	Major General Paul David McLachlan CSC	For exceptional service to the Australian Defence Force as the Director General Development and Plans-Army, and as the Commander of the 7th Brigade.	
Army	Brigadier Barry Neil McManus CSC	For exceptional service to the Australian Defence Force as the Director General Capability and Plans and as the Army Attaché to the United States of America.	
Army	Brigadier Jane Maree Spalding	For exceptional service to the Australian Defence Force in the fields of recruiting and strategic reform.	
Army	Colonel Wade Bradley Stothart	For exceptional service as Commanding Officer Timor Leste Battle Group-Four, Commanding Officer of the 3rd Battalion, the Royal Australian Regiment, Military Assistant to the Commander Forces Command and Director of Officer Career Management-Army.	

=== Medal (OAM) ===
==== General Division ====
Recipient	Citation	Notes
Lieta Acquarola	For service to the hospitality industry, and to a range of charitable organisations.	
John Geoffrey Adnams	For service to business and commerce, and to the community.	
Francis Xavier Alcorta	For service to veterans and their families, and to journalism.	
Maree Sarah Allen	For service to highland dancing as a teacher, adjudicator and administrator.	
Dr Mustafa Abbas Ally	For service to the community through the promotion of interfaith harmony.	
Phillip Gregory Anderson	For service to the international community following the earthquakes and tsunami which occurred in Japan in 2011.	
Pamela Clare Archer	For service to music, and to the community of Taree.	
Russell Joseph Ardley	For service to youth through Mornington Peninsula Youth Enterprises.	
Meredith Claire Arnold	For service to the community of Waikerie.	
Krishna Arora	For service to the community through multicultural and aged welfare organisations.	
Philip Henry Asker	For service to the tourism industry, and to the community.	
Dr Francis Atchison	For service to the community of New England as a historian and educator.	
Philadelphia Alaine Atkinson	For service to the community, particularly people with a disability.	
Brian Laurence Baldwin	For service to the community of Inverell through a range of organisations.	
John Graeme Balfour	For service to the community, particularly veterans.	
Ronald Frederick Barnes	For service to youth through the Scouting movement.	
Donald James Barton	For service to the community through church and welfare organisations.	
Dr Malcolm Baxter	For service to medicine as an ear, nose and throat specialist.	
Olga Lillian Bayley	For service to the community as a supporter of charitable organisations.	
Clinical Professor Graeme Leslie Beardmore	For service to medicine in the field of dermatology.	
Dr Allan Kenneth Beavis	For service to music, and to education.	
Linda Karen Beilharz	For service to the community, and to polar exploration.	
Philip William Bell	For service to education, and to the community.	
John Maxwell Benyon	For service to radio broadcasting, and to the community.	
Robert Alan Blake	For service to surf lifesaving as an administrator and official.	
Eftihia Angelica Bland	For service to the community through charitable organisations.	
Terence Paul Boardman	For service to surf lifesaving, and to the community.	
John Samuel Bolitho	For service to the community of Finley.	
Brendan Matthew Bolton	For service to the international community following the earthquakes and tsunami which occurred in Japan in 2011.	
Kevin John Borger	For service to veterans and their families, and to people with a disability.	
Peter Gerard Boyce	For service to the community of the Sunshine Coast.	
Robert Arthur Breeden †	For service to conservation and the environment, and to the community.	
Dr James Ernest Breheny	For service to medical administration.	
Dr Nellie Dianne Bresciani	For service to music, to the visual arts, and to the community.	
David John Briegel	For service to the community through charitable and historical organisations.	
Tessie Florence Brill	For service to the community of the Northern Rivers.	
Victor Vincent Brill	For service to the community of the Northern Rivers.	
Jeffrey Ross Britton	For service to conservation and the environment, and to the community.	
John Winton Broombey	For service to conservation and the environment, and to the community.	
Colin McIntyre Brown	For service to the community of the Riverina, particularly as an educator.	
Kenneth Raymond Brown	For service to the sport of tennis through administrative roles.	
Colin Francis Browne	For service to the sport of athletics, to education, and to the community.	
Jennifer Mary Bryant	For service to wildlife conservation.	
Walter Buldo	For service to the community, particularly veterans and their families.	
Richard Alfred Burns	For service to botany, as an author and conservationist.	
Raelene Mary Bussenschutt	For service to the community through health, agricultural and women's organisations.	
Phillip Anthony Butler	For service to the community of Glenorchy.	
Hazel Dawn Butorac	For service to the community through a range of organisations.	
Betty Iris Byrne	For service to the community of Burnie.	
Commodore Ian Arthur Callaway RAN (Retired)	For service to veterans and their families.	
Donald Cameron	For service to local government, to conservation and the environment, and to the community, particularly through Lions International.	
Dr John Dominic Cannon	For service to the sport of sailing.	
The Reverend Father George Carpis	For service to the Greek Orthodox Church, and to the community.	
Professor Vincent Caruso	For service to medicine in the field of pathology.	
Norma Alice Castaldi	For service to the community as a fundraiser and volunteer.	
Nigel Phillip Caswell	For service to the community through a range of organisations.	
Joanne Cavanagh	For service to the community through social welfare organisations.	
Stephen Lindsay Cavanagh	For service to education, and to the sport of rugby league football.	
John Laurence Chadban	For service to local government, and to the community of the Great Lakes region.	
Brian Erskine Chaseling MBE	For service to veterans and their families.	
Dr Kee Cheung	For service to the Chinese community of Brisbane.	
Alan Charles Clough	For service to the sports of Australian Rules football and lawn bowls, and to the community.	
Robert Edward Clyne	For service to the community, particularly through the Freemasonry movement.	
Patricia June Conolly	For service to the community of the Sunshine Coast.	
Jane Louise Cooke	For service to the sport of gymnastics as an administrator.	
Joanne Frances Court	For service to the community as an advocate for health, early childhood development and conservation organisations.	
Kenneth John Craddock	For service to the community of Narrabri, particularly veterans and their families.	
Heather Janice Crombie	For service to the community through remote health organisations.	
Carole Crommelin	For service to the community through health and charitable organisations.	
Wilbur Henry Cross	For service to music as a bandmaster, teacher and mentor.	
Ronald James Cumming	For service to the community of Bunyip.	
Alan Richard Curry	For service to the community, particularly veterans and their families.	
Peter Howard Dale	For service to the performing arts, and to the community of Ballarat.	
Marilyn Jean Dann	For service to the deaf and hearing impaired.	
John Gerard Davies	For service to youth through a range of organisations.	
Councillor John Neville Davis	For service to local government, and to the community of Orange.	
Douglas Charles Daws	For service to the mining industry, to local government, and to the community of Kalgoorlie.	
Robert Alan Dawson	For service to the community as a volunteer.	
Wadacita Day	For service to the trade union movement, and to the community.	
Neil Dickins	For service to the community through social welfare and sporting organisations.	
Margot Balfour Dods	For service to music through administrative roles.	
Colleen Frances Dolan	For service to people with a disability.	
The Reverend Father Ignatius Tyson Doneley	For service to the community through Catholic education organisations.	
Patrick Joseph Donnellan	For service to the community of Gosford.	
Thomas Henry Donohue	For service to the community through social welfare organisations.	
William Keith Downie	For service to business, and to the community.	
Alan Ralph Duggan	For service to the community of the Huon Valley.	
John Stephen Dwyer	For service to the community through a range of organisations.	
Leslie David Elcome	For service to people with a disability.	
Alan Frederick Elliott	For service to photography.	
Patrick George Emery	For service to the community through health and charitable organisations.	
Trevor Farrell	For service to people with a disability.	
Jules Mark Feldman	For service to the print media industry.	
Graham Henry Felton	For service to the community through aged care organisations.	
Michael Angel Fernandez	For service to the community through public health programs.	
Holly Ferrara	For service to youth through the Scouting movement.	
Juanita Mary Field	For service to the community through church and women's organisations.	
Jack Leonard Fisher	For service to the community through a range of Jewish organisations.	
Joseph Fleming ED	For service to the community, and to aged care.	
Deborah Fleming-Bauer	For service to the television industry.	
Roy Alton Flynn	For service to local government, and to the community.	
Wendy Folvig	For service to the community through a range of organisations.	
Major Norman Glyn Ford (Retired)	For service to the community.	
Ronald Neil Forte	For service to surf lifesaving, and to the community.	
Professor Bradley Scott Frankum	For service to medicine as an educator and administrator.	
Albert William Gamble	For service to youth through the Scouting movement.	
Geoffrey Philip Garnett	For service to the sport of athletics as an official and administrator.	
Glen David Garrick	For service to surf lifesaving.	
Yvon Albert Gatineau	For service to the community of Lightning Ridge.	
Dr Robert Gerner	For service to architectural education, particularly in the field of urban design.	
Mark Bradley Geyer	For service to the sport of Rugby League football, and to the community through a range of charitable organisations.	
Dr Francesco Giacobbe	For service to the Italian community of New South Wales.	
Richard James Giddings	For service to the community of Brighton.	
Lionel Herbert Gillman	For service to the community through Lions Australia.	
Giuseppe Gianpiero Guigni	For service to the community through multicultural and charitable organisations.	
Gordon Holland Glascock	For service to the community.	
Brian Thomas Gleeson	For service to the community of South Australia through the management of sporting events.	
Mary Laelia Glen †	For service to local government, and to the community of Condobolin.	
Peter John Goers	For service to the community as a radio broadcaster.	
Frederick Charles Goode	For service to veterans and their families.	
John Kevin Goodfellow	For service to education.	
Robin Leslie Gordon	For service to the preservation of social and local history, and to the community.	
Carolyn Mary Gould	For service to the cashmere industry, and to the community.	
Bernard Frederick Graham	For service to the community through a range of organisations.	
David Graham	For service to the community through a range of organisations.	
Keith Cyril Graham	For service to the community of Swansea.	
William Hamilton Grant	For service to business, and to the community.	
Ross Grayson	For service to the community of Killarney.	
Roger Michael Greenan	For service to the community through contributions to men's health and well-being.	
Doreen Clare Greenham	For service to the community of Balranald.	
Maureen Joy Grieve	For service to the community of Ballina.	
Bruce Atkin Griffiths	For service to the automotive manufacturing industry, and to the community.	
Geoffrey Leonard Grimish	For service to the community through fundraising activities.	
Sydney Grolman	For service to the community.	
The Honourable Paul Marshall Guest QC	For service to the community, and to the sport of rowing.	
Harmick Hacobian	For service to the Armenian community.	
Christopher Ben Halford	For service to the international community following the earthquakes and tsunami which occurred in Japan in 2011.	
Ted Hamilton	For service to the performing arts, and to the community.	
Noel Bernard Hannant	For service to the community of Toowoomba.	
Warwick William Hansen	For service to the community, and to the funeral industry.	
Thomas Frank Harding ED	For service to the community through historical and service organisations.	
Trevor Albert Hargreaves	For service to the community of Yarrawonga.	
Alan Murray Harper	For service to education.	
Antona Harris	For service to the community.	
Dr James Michael Harris	For service to veterinary science and animal welfare.	
Beryl Gwendalen Hay	For service to the blind and partially sighted.	
Peter John Hayes-Williams	For service to veterans and their families.	
Raymond Shane Hayden	For service to radio broadcasting.	
Charles Harry Heath	For service to the real estate industry, and to the community.	
Robert Glen Heinrich	For service to the information technology industry.	
Douglas Rayment Henderson	For service to veterans and their families, and to youth.	
Nina Olive Higgins	For service to the community of Bundaberg.	
Margaret Ann Hodgens	For service to the community of Inverell.	
Robert John Holloway	For service to the community, and to veterans and their families.	
Trevor William Holloway	For service to the international community following the earthquakes and tsunami which occurred in Japan in 2011.	
Dr Miriam Frances Holmes	For service to youth through the Guiding movement.	
Susan Ruth Hoopmann	For service to local government.	
Dr John Dennis Horton	For service to medicine, and to the community.	
Richard Lancelot House	For service to conservation and the environment, and to the community.	
Louise Amelia Howden-Smith	For service to the performing arts, particularly ballet.	
Catherine Gai Howells	For service to physiotherapy, and to people with a disability.	
Suzanne Joy Hoyle	For service to the community through health care organisations.	
Leslie Irene Huggins †	For service to local government, and to the community of Alice Springs.	
Professor Robert Iansek	For service to medicine in the field of neurology.	
Robert John Irvine	For service to education, to regional development, and to the community.	
Peter Boutros Jabbour	For service to the community through multicultural and charitable organisations.	
Sigmund Alexander Jablonski	For service to Vietnam veterans.	
Clifford Robert Jackson	For service to the blind and partially sighted, and to the aviation industry.	
William Robert Jackson PSM	For service to the international community following the earthquakes and tsunami which occurred in Japan in 2011.	
Edward Jaku	For service to the Jewish community.	
Claude Justin Jeanneret	For service to surf lifesaving.	
Harold Dawson Johnston †	For service to the community through aged care and charitable organisations.	
Dr Anthony Douglas Jordan	For service to the Australian wine industry as a wine maker, administrator and judge.	
Sigmund Jörgensen	For service to the visual arts, and to the community.	
Raivo Kalamae	For service to the community through multicultural and veterans' organisation.	
Patricia May Kennedy	For service to veterans and their families, particularly as an entertainer.	
Lillace Mary Kenta	For service to the international community following the earthquakes and tsunami which occurred in Japan in 2011.	
Malcolm John Kerr	For service to the Parliament of New South Wales.	
Anthony Khouri	For service to the community through multicultural organisations.	
Norma King	For service to the community as a historian.	
George Klein	For service to community health through drug and alcohol related programs.	
Christine Anne Knight	For service to the community through a range of organisations.	
Brian James Kotz	For service to the community, particularly veterans and their families.	
David Allan Lane	For service to local government, and to the community.	
Anne Merle Lang	For service to the community through sporting and fitness organisations.	
Margaret Ruth Lange	For service to music as an educator and administrator.	
Diane Therese Langmack	For service to the community through charitable and women's organisations.	
Patricia Anne Lanham	For service to the community, particularly through mental health organisations.	
Max Andrew Laurie	For service to the community.	
George Lazaris	For service to the community through multicultural organisation.	
Anne Elizabeth Leadbeater	For service to the community of Kinglake, particularly in the aftermath of the 2009 Victorian Bushfires.	
Lloyd Christie Leah	For service to conservation and the environment.	
Hugh Lee	For service to the Chinese community of Eastwood.	
James Kyungkyu Lee	For service to the Korean community of Canterbury.	
Allan Andrew Lees	For service to the performing arts.	
Bruce David Lindenmayer	For service to conservation and the environment.	
Russell John Loane	For service to engineering in the field of illumination.	
Sister Berneice Mary Loch	For service to the community through the Institute of Sisters of Mercy.	
Kerry Thomas Longeran	For service to the media, and to the community.	
Patrick John Long	For service to the aerial mustering industry.	
Richard Craig Longmore	For service to herpetology, particularly the study of snakes and lizards.	
Mary Elizabeth Lovett	For service to the blind and partially sighted, and to the community.	
Theda Claire Lowe	For service to the performing arts.	
Charles Lowles	For service to local government, and to the community.	
Abigail Margaret Luders	For service to the international community following the earthquakes and tsunami which occurred in Japan in 2011.	
Margaret Mary Lynch	For service to the community through adult multicultural education.	
Richard John Lytham	For service to surf lifesaving.	
Alexander Urquhart McArthur	For service to the community through Oxfam Australia.	
Hugh Calmar McCrindle	For service to the community of Taree.	
Shane William MacDonald	For service to the community of the Darling Downs.	
Andrew John McDougall	For service to the community of Orange through social welfare organisations.	
Robin James McKenzie	For service to the international community following the earthquakes and tsunami which occurred in Japan in 2011.	
Ian Geoffrey McKeown	For service to the community, particularly veterans and their families.	
Archibald John McLeish	For service to the community of Albury.	
Patrick MacMillan	For service to the community through Alzheimer's Australia New South Wales.	
Brigadier Philip John McNamara CSC, ESM (Retired)	For service to the community, particularly veterans and their families.	
Alexander McDonald McNeill	For service to veterans and their families.	
Donald Lane MacRaild	For service to the community through the Vanuatu Prevention of Blindness Project.	
Nisia Margaret MacRaild	For service to the community through the Vanuatu Prevention of Blindness Project.	
Herbert Charles Mangelsdorf	For service to sport, particularly lawn bowls.	
Dr Michael William Moroney	For service to the sport of athletics, particularly triathlon.	
Dr Joseph Julius Masika	For service to the community through multicultural and social welfare organisations.	
Dr Artis Visvaldis Medenis	For service to veterinary science, and to the community.	
Pamela Mendels	For service to the community as a volunteer with Jewish organisations.	
Peter William Middleton †	For service to music, and to the community.	
Dennis Davis Miles	For service to the sport of football.	
Peter Bertram Mill	For service to the community, particularly in the field of radio communications.	
Lieutenant Commander Christopher Anthony Mills (Retired)	For service to the community of Townsville.	
Dr Richard Morley Milner	For service to the community, particularly through Rotary International.	
Rosa Frances Miot	For service to people with a disability, particularly through sport and recreation.	
Paul Francis Molloy	For service to the international community following the earthquakes and tsunami which occurred in Japan in 2011.	
Leanne Deirdre Morgan	For service to diving as an administrator and coach.	
Ian Richard Morison	For service to the community, particularly through contributions to pipe band performance.	
Belinda Morrison	For service to the Australian music industry as a performer and advocate.	
David John Motteram	For service to the community.	
George Alan Murdoch	For service to education in isolated communities.	
Councillor Antonio Anthony Mustaca	For service to the community through a range of organisations.	
Dr Geoffrey Vernon Mutton	For service to medicine in the field of orthopaedic surgery.	
Filippo Navarra	For service to the community.	
Bernard Patrick "Doc" Neeson	For service to the performing arts as a singer and songwriter, and to the community.	
Desmond John Nelson	For service to conservation and the environment, particularly in central Australia.	
Coralie Dawn Newman	For service to the sport of netball as an administrator.	
Dobe Newton	For service to the performing arts as an entertainer and advocate.	
Audrey Margaret Nicholls	For service to the performing arts, particularly ballet.	
Hedley Nicholson	For service to the sport of tennis, and to the community of Parkes.	
Gillian Cavendish Nikakis	For service to nursing through mental health support program.	
Charles William Oakenfull	For service to the community as a foster carer.	
Patricia Gwendoline Oakenfull	For service to the community as a foster carer.	
Robert Bruce O'Callaghan	For service to the Australian wine industry, and to the community of the Barossa Valley.	
Judith Mary Ohana	For service to aged care.	
Richard Norman Olesinski	For service to conservation and the environment, and to surf lifesaving.	
Duncan Ord	For service to the performing arts as an administrator.	
Peter O'Shaughnessy	For service to the performing arts as a writer, theatre director, actor, historian and folklorist.	
Anthony Philip Oxley	For service to the visual arts, and to the community.	
Roslyn Mary Oxley	For service to the visual arts, and to the community.	
Helen Paatsch	For service to the community of Colac.	
Louise Mary Page	For service to the performing arts.	
Graham Dudley Parham	For service to equestrian sport.	
David Parkin	For service to the sport of Australian rules football as an administrator, coach and player.	
James Harrison Parkins	For service to the community through service organisations.	
Graham David Partridge	For service to the community through a range of organisations.	
The Very Reverend Father Diogenis Patsouris	For service to the Greek Orthodox Church, and to the community.	
Diana Mary Patterson	For service to conservation and the environment.	
Yvonne Maureen Pattinson	For service to the community through a range of organisations.	
Maxwell James Peake	For service to the sport of harness racing, and to the community.	
Pasquale Pedulla	For service to the community through multicultural and aged care organisations.	
Dr Dawn Margaret Peel	For service to the community of Colac as a local historian.	
Brian Joseph Pennington	For service to people with a disability, particularly through 'Wheelchairs Rule OK' Disability Camps.	
Dr George Christopher Peponis	For service to the sport of rugby league football, and to the community.	
Malcolm John Peters	For service to primary industry, to regional development, and to the community.	
Steven Peuschel	For service to the community through health care organisations.	
Deânne Cynthia Phillips	For service to the community of Orange through social welfare organisations, particularly for youth and the aged.	
Winston Churchill Phillips	For service to local government, and to the community of the Monaro and Snowy Mountains region.	
William Anthony "Bill" Phippen	For service to people with disability, and to the community.	
Robert Ian Pollock	For service to the community through the St Vincent de Paul Society.	
William Alfred Polwarth	For service to the community of Geelong.	
Graham Lewis Porter	For service to the community through sporting, youth and service organisation.	
Barbara Jean Prangnell	For service to youth, particularly through The Girls' Brigade.	
Keith Albert Pretty PSM	For service to local government, and to the community.	
Bruce Edward Price	For service to the community of Ballarat.	
Agostino Puopolo	For service to the sport of athletics as an administrator and coach.	
Barbara Patrick Quinn	For service to the Northern Rivers community.	
Michael Forsyth Rabbitt	For service to the community through a range of charitable organisations.	
Alan Henry Rae	For service to the community, particularly through Rotary International.	
Professor Ajay Rane	For service to medicine in the field of urogynaecology.	
Harold Joseph Reardon	For service to the community of Gundagai.	
Dr John William Reggars	For service to community health as a chiropractor.	
Wulf Ernest Reichler	For service to local government, to conservation and the environment, and to the community.	
Dr John Cracroft Rice	For service to medicine as an ear, nose and throat specialist.	
Alan Thorold Richardson	For service to veterans and their families, and to the community of Belmont.	
Denise Kaye Richardson	For service to the community through charitable and sporting organisations.	
Donald Gilbert Roach	For service to veterans and their families.	
Bernice Patricia Roberts	For service to the community of Seaton.	
David John Roberts	For service to surf lifesaving.	
Frank Arthur Roberts	For service to community health, particularly through patient support services.	
Ian Thomas Roberts	For service to the community of Blyth.	
Peter Llewelyn Roberts	For service to the international community following the earthquakes and tsunami which occurred in Japan in 2011.	
Trevor William Robinson	For service to human rights, particularly as an advocate for the gay and lesbian community.	
Dr Mark Alexander Robson	For service to community health, particularly through the Melton Cancer Support Group.	
Brett Stephen Roenfeldt	For service to the real estate industry through administrative roles.	
Antonio Romeo	For service to the community as a supporter of a range of local organisations.	
Elizabeth Romeo	For service to the community as a supporter of a range of local organisations.	
Dr Jon David Rosenthal	For service to the visual arts as promoter of Australian artists.	
Phillip Joseph Russo	For service to local government, and to the community of Parramatta.	
Barry Thomas Ryan	For service to the performing arts, particularly opera.	
Desmond Kearns Ryan	For service to people with disabilities.	
Paul Andrew Salisbury	For service to the international community following the earthquakes and tsunami which occurred in Japan in 2011.	
Daniel John Salmon	For service to the community of Albury Wodonga, particularly through the Australian Air Force Cadets.	
Michael Reginald Scarce	For service to the community of Camden.	
Paul Martin Schremmer	For service to industrial design.	
Dr John Charles Schwartz	For service to international relations, particularly through the African AIDS Foundation.	
Rosalie Gae Schwartz	For service to international relations, particularly through the African AIDS Foundation.	
Bernard George Scobie	For service to the community through youth and charitable organisations.	
Reginald Hugh Sellers	For service to the sport of cricket, particularly as an administrator.	
Nancy Maria Assunta Serg	For service to the Maltese community of New South Wales.	
The Reverend Father Thomas Harold Shanahan	For service to veterans and their families, and to the community.	
Dr Navaratnam Shanmuganathan	For service to the Tamil community of Victoria.	
Gregory Roger Shannon	For service to the building and construction industry through vocational training and education.	
Mervyn Ray Sharman	For service to local government, and to the community of Glen Innes.	
Kevin Vincent Sheehan	For service to the sport of Australian Rules football.	
John Vincent Sidgreaves †	For service to pharmacy, and to the community.	
Rosalie Anne Silverstein	For service to the community through educational, charitable and Jewish organisations.	
Wendy Susan Simpson	For service to the community through a range of women's and youth organisations.	
Group Captain Arthur William Skimin (Retired)	For service to the community, particularly veterans and their families.	
Michael William Small	For service to the Indigenous communities of Queensland.	
Rosemary Louise Smart	For service to the community through local and historical organisations.	
Barrie Robert Standford	For service to surf lifesaving.	
Loreen Olive Stanhope	For service to the community through language programs assisting migrants and refugees.	
Barry James Stanton	For service to sports administration and to the sport of athletics.	
Benjamin Stewart	For service to youth through the Australian Air Force Cadets.	
Suzanne Ruby Stoddart	For service to the community of Dunedoo.	
Henry Paul Street	For service to the community through Rotary International.	
Nancy Margaret Strickland	For service to the community through a range of organisations.	
Thomas Neil Strickland	For service to the community through a range of organisations.	
Diane Lois Sullivan	For service to the community of Evandale.	
Christina Monsarrat Sumner	For service to the visual arts.	
Shirley Mary Symes	For service to the community of Charters Towers.	
Dr Richard Joohuat Tan	For service to medicine, and to the community of Biloela.	
Beshara Taouk	For service to the Lebanese community in Victoria.	
David William Tattersall	For service to music as an educator and administrator.	
Janet Thomas	For service to the mathematical sciences.	
Heather Thorne	For service to community health, particularly through breast cancer research.	
Dean Edward Turner	For service to the sport of volleyball as an administrator, referee and coach.	
Brian Claud Twite	For service to the sport of golf as an administrator and mentor.	
Lesley Mary Uren	For service to arts and crafts as an embroidery artist and educator.	
Sandra Lisa Ursino	For service to children and young people through Radio Lollipop.	
Robert Alister Vagg	For service to local government, and to the community.	
Dr Geza Ferencz Varasdi	For service to medicine as a general practitioner.	
Bernard Leonard Verwayen	For service to veterans and their families.	
John Edwin Voss	For service to the community of Wahgunyah.	
Susan Louise Wakefield	For service to youth through the Guiding movement.	
Joan Wallis	For service to the community.	
Roderick Alexander Walters	For service to people with a disability.	
Alan Bruce Ward	For service to local government, and to the community of Cootamundra.	
Keith Matthew Warnock	For service to the community of Holroyd.	
Monica Winnifred Warren	For service to the community.	
Allan James Watson	For service to local government, and to the community.	
Elizabeth Isabell Webb	For service to the community of Glenreagh.	
Associate Professor Michael John Weidmann	For service to medicine in the field of neurosurgery.	
Malcolm Robert Weir	For service to the community of Gerringong.	
Peter Weston	For service to conservation and the environment.	
Ian Gifford Westray	For service to the sport of football as an administrator.	
Anthony John Wheeler	For service to the community through health and church organisations.	
Robert Frederick Whiteway	For service to conservation and the environment.	
Shirley Joan Wilhelm	For service to the community through church and service organisations.	
Geoffrey Alan Williams	For service to conservation and the environment.	
Peter James Williams	For service to the community of Toowoomba.	
Glenn Kenneth Willmann	For service to the veterans and their families.	
Dr Anthony Rodham Wilson	For service to medicine, and to the community of Tumut.	
Bruce Douglas Wilson	For service to the print media industry, and to the community of Cessnock.	
Joan Mary Wilson	For service to the Tibetan community.	
Lindsay Robert Wood	For service to the sport of cricket, and to the community.	
Peter Michael Woods	For service to the sport of rugby union football as an administrator.	
Wendy Joyce Woodward	For service to the community through a range of organisations.	
Betty Margaret Wright	For service to the community through aged care and health organisations.	
David Willmer Wright	For service to the visual arts using the medium of stained glass.	
Ronny Yeo	For service to the community through a range of organisations.	
Panayiotes Michael Yiannoudes	For service to the Greek and Cypriot communities through multicultural organisations.	
Kenneth James Young	For service to the community, and to veterans and their families.	

==== Military Division ====
Branch	Recipient	Citation	Notes
Navy	Warrant Officer Timothy Joseph Holliday	For meritorious service to the Royal Australian Navy in the area of workforce and personnel career development within the Communications and Information Systems category.	
Navy	Chief Petty Officer Arron Cameron Watson	For meritorious service in the field of marine engineering in the Royal Australian Navy.	
Army	Captain A	For meritorious service.	
Army	Warrant Officer Class One Stephen Michael Greenall	For meritorious service as the Artificer Sergeant Major of the 5th/7th Battalion, the Royal Australian Regiment, as Maintenance Manager of Joint Logistic Unit North, and as Electrical and Mechanical Engineering Warrant Officer of the 1st Brigade.	
Army	Warrant Officer Class One H	For meritorious service to the Special Operations Command in regimental leadership roles.	
Army	Warrant Officer Class One David Ross Lehr	For meritorious service as the Regimental Sergeant Major of the 2nd/10th Field Regiment, Joint Task Force 635 Operation ANODE Rotation 13, and the 1st Field Regiment.	
Army	Warrant Officer Class One John Robert Pickett	For meritorious service as the Drill Wing Sergeant Major, Royal Military College Duntroon and as the Regimental Sergeant Major of the 41st Battalion, the Royal New South Wales Regiment, and the 2nd Battalion, the Royal Australian Regiment.	
Army	Warrant Officer Class One Richard Alfred Verrall	For meritorious service as the Regimental Sergeant Major of the 2nd/17th Battalion, Royal New South Wales Regiment and the 7th Battalion, the Royal Australian Regiment.	
Air Force	Wing Commander Rudy Thomas Darvill	For meritorious service in leadership, development and sustainment of the Maritime Intelligence, Surveillance Reconnaissance and Response capability.	
Air Force	Warrant Officer Russell George Kennedy CSC	For meritorious service in the field of Reserve training development and management within Director General Reserves-Air Force Branch.	
Air Force	Squadron Leader Ravinder Singh	For meritorious service in the field of airlift capability support.	

== Meritorious Service ==
=== Public Service Medal (PSM) ===
Public Service Medal ribbon

State/ Territory	Recipient	Citation
Australian Capital Territory	Pamela Ruth Davoren	For outstanding public service in the leadership of co-ordinated and integrated policy development and service delivery across the ACT Public Service.
Australian Capital Territory	Lois Mary Ford	For outstanding public service in the leadership of social justice for persons with a disability and the most fundamental shift in service reform and community attitude change in the Australian Capital Territory over the past 10 years.
Queensland	Paul John Brown	For outstanding public service to the Queensland Police Service.
Queensland	Guillermo Capati	For outstanding public service to the sustainable water future of the Gold Coast and broader South East Queensland region.
Queensland	Dr Mark Stewart Elcock	For outstanding public service in the development and delivery of integrated patient transport and retrieval services across Queensland.
Queensland	Kathryn Mary Frankland	For outstanding public service to the development and research of historical family records for Indigenous people of Queensland.
Queensland	Dr Neil Richard Wigg	For outstanding public service to paediatrics and child health in Australia.
New South Wales	Ralph Edward Bott	For outstanding public service through the planning and management of visits and events at the Sydney Opera House.
New South Wales	Dr Lee Clifford Bowling	For outstanding public service to water quality and management.
New South Wales	Kevin Cooper AFSM	For outstanding public service to agricultural technology and research.
New South Wales	Robert Geyer	For outstanding public service to agricultural technology and research.
New South Wales	Glynis Ann Ingram	For outstanding public service as the Regional Director for Community Services Western Region, New South Wales.
New South Wales	Patricia Mary Kelly	For outstanding public service as the General Manager, Human Resources, in the NSW Department of Education and Communities.
New South Wales	Ethel McAlpine	For outstanding public service to people with a disability in New South Wales.
New South Wales	Julie Anne Newman	For outstanding public service through the implementation of a range of organisational and financial reforms in New South Wales, and as a contributor to the establishment of the Safety, Return to Work and Support Division.
New South Wales	Ivan Novak	For outstanding public service to teaching in the hospitality industry.
New South Wales	Saravanamutthu Shanmugamany	For outstanding public service to Housing NSW.
New South Wales	John William Willing	For outstanding public service to education in western New South Wales.
Victoria	Wayne John Craig	For outstanding public service to education in the Northern Metropolitan Region of Victoria.
Victoria	Margaret Mary Dobson	For outstanding public service to the Primary School Nursing Program.
Victoria	Malcolm Allan Millar	For outstanding public service to the Primary School Nursing Program.
Victoria	Dr Clive Leslie Noble	For outstanding public service and leadership in science policy, innovation, collaboration and governance at state and national levels.
Victoria	Lenard Alan Norman	For outstanding public service within Corrections Victoria.
Western Australia	Allen Ronald Cooper	For outstanding public service to the Shire of East Pilbara.
Western Australia	Geraldine Monica Ennis	For outstanding public service in the provision of health services in rural and remote regions of Western Australia.
Western Australia	Dr Andrew Geoffrey Robertson CSC	For outstanding public service as Director, Disaster Management and Preparedness within WA Health.
Western Australia	Mark Gregory Webb	For outstanding public service to the Botanic Gardens and Parks Authority in Perth, Western Australia.
South Australia	Darren Robert Renshaw	For outstanding public service to the Repatriation General Hospital and to the wider veteran community.
South Australia	Valerie Ann Smyth	For outstanding public service in the area of health and emergency management.
South Australia	Lynne Symons	For outstanding public service in the area of public education in disadvantaged areas.
Tasmania	Peter Graeme Brownscombe, deceased (Award 17 September 2012)	For outstanding public service to the Tasmanian community in several Government agencies, particularly for initiatives and innovation that have resulted in outcomes that have greatly benefited Tasmania and its economy.
Tasmania	Geoffrey Stephen Coles	For outstanding public service to the management of conservation outcomes, land management and visitor experiences across national parks and other reserved lands in Tasmania.
Northern Territory	Patricia Gweneth Angus	For outstanding public service to health and housing policy, and programs and services to indigenous people in the Northern Territory.
Northern Territory	Jennifer Gail Prince	For outstanding public service and leadership, particularly as Under Treasurer for the Northern Territory.

=== Australian Police Medal (APM) ===
Australian Police Medal ribbon

Branch	Recipient
Australian Federal Police	Commander Bruce Philip Giles
Australian Federal Police	Detective Superintendent William Edward Quade
Australian Federal Police	Assistant Commissioner Justine Georgina Saunders
New South Wales Police	Inspector Edward Anthony Bosch
New South Wales Police	Sergeant Kevin Bernard Daley
New South Wales Police	Superintendent Luke Freudenstein
New South Wales Police	Inspector Guy Charles Guiana
New South Wales Police	Inspector Inspector Stephen John Henkel
New South Wales Police	Sergeant Peter Andrew Lunney
New South Wales Police	Detective Sergeant John Robertson
New South Wales Police	Superintendent John Spooner
New South Wales Police	Superintendent John Joseph Stapleton
Victoria Police	Inspector Michael James Beattie
Victoria Police	Senior Sergeant Ian Stewart Forrester
Victoria Police	Inspector Gregory John Parr
Queensland Police	Detective Superintendent Mark William Ainsworth
Queensland Police	Chief Superintendent Brent John Carter
Queensland Police	Senior Sergeant Peta Louise Comadria
Queensland Police	Superintendent Thomas Herbert Gockel
Queensland Police	Superintendent Glenn Andrew Horton
Queensland Police	Senior Sergeant Graham John Lohmann
Western Australia Police	Acting Superintendent Barry Lynton Kitson
Western Australia Police	Brevet Senior Sergeant Neville Vernon Ripp
Western Australia Police	Commander Paul Anthony Zanetti
South Australia Police	Sergeant Michael James Butler
South Australia Police	Sergeant Meredith Fay Huxley
South Australia Police	Detective Senior Sergeant Trevor George Jenkins
Tasmania Police	Sergeant Christopher Ivan Lucas
Tasmania Police	Inspector David William Plumpton
Northern Territory Police	Sergeant Paula Maree Dooley-McDonnell
Northern Territory Police	Superintendent Kristopher John Evans

=== Australian Fire Service Medal (AFSM) ===
Australian Fire Service Medal ribbon

Branch	Recipient
New South wales Fire Service	Doctor Gregory Mark Buckley
New South wales Fire Service	Lindsay Ronald Henley
New South wales Fire Service	Barrie John Hewitt
New South wales Fire Service	David Bruce Milliken
New South wales Fire Service	Tom Nolles
New South wales Fire Service	Errol James Smith
New South wales Fire Service	James Patrick Smith
New South wales Fire Service	Wayne Staples
New South wales Fire Service	Ian Charles Stewart
New South wales Fire Service	Barry John Tindall
Victoria Fire Service	Rocky Joseph Barca
Victoria Fire Service	David Eric Blackburn
Victoria Fire Service	Barry William Dale
Victoria Fire Service	James Roger Fox
Victoria Fire Service	Gregory John McCarthy
Victoria Fire Service	William Maurice Rouse
Queensland Fire Service	Noel Bruce Harbottle
Queensland Fire Service	Ian Gregory Holm
Queensland Fire Service	Alun Granville Williams
Western Australia Fire Service	Malcolm Graham Cronstedt
Western Australia Fire Service	Peter Keppel
South Australia Fire Service	Steven Allen Moir
South Australia Fire Service	Kenneth Andrew Potter
South Australia Fire Service	Robert Cameron Stott
South Australia Fire Service	Peter Colin Wicks
Tasmania Fire Service	Kenneth Burns
Tasmania Fire Service	Garry John Cooper
Tasmania Fire Service	Rodney Kenneth Sweetnam ESM
ACT Fire Service	Gregory Leonard Buscombe
NI Fire Service	Gerard Patrick Downie

=== Ambulance Service Medal (ASM) ===
Ambulance Service Medal ribbon

Branch	Recipient
New South wales Ambulance Service	Michael John Corlis
New South wales Ambulance Service	Ian Neil Johns
New South wales Ambulance Service	Terence Edward Watson
New South wales Ambulance Service	Kenneth Charles Wheeler
Victoria Ambulance Service	Jonathan David Byrne
Victoria Ambulance Service	Anthony Scott Oxford
Victoria Ambulance Service	Kerry Charles Power
Queensland Ambulance Service	Kevin John Elliott
Queensland Ambulance Service	Ann Clarice Taggart
Western Australia Ambulance Service	Sally Anna Gifford
Western Australia Ambulance Service	Sally Ann Simmonds
Western Australia Ambulance Service	John Douglas Watts
South Australian Ambulance Service	Dean Hamilton Clarke
South Australian Ambulance Service	Dawn Frances Kromer
Tasmanian Ambulance Service	Grant Gordon Lennox

=== Emergency Services Medal (ESM) ===
Emergency Services Medal ribbon

Branch	Recipient
New South Wales Emergency Services	Russell Ian Ashdown
New South Wales Emergency Services	Jon Glenn Gregory
New South Wales Emergency Services	James Angus McTavish CSC
Victoria Emergency Services	Timothy James Wiebusch
Queensland Emergency Services	Christopher Ernest Arnott
Queensland Emergency Services	Kevin James Donnelly
Queensland Emergency Services	Adrianus Fransiscus Van Den Ende OAM
South Australia Emergency Services	Trevor John Bond
Tasmanian Emergency Services	Donald George Mackrill AFSM, OAM
Tasmanian Emergency Services	Mark David Nelson
Tasmanian Emergency Services	Bevis Charles Perkins
Northern Territory Emergency Services	Mark Richard Fishlock CSM

== Gallantry, Distinguished and Conspicuous Service ==
=== Medal for Gallantry (MG) ===
Medal for Gallantry ribbon

Branch	Recipient	Citation
Army	Corporal B.	For acts of gallantry in action in hazardous circumstances.
Army	Corporal J.	For acts of gallantry in action in hazardous circumstances on Operation SLIPPER in Afghanistan, June 2010.
Army	Corporal N.	For acts of gallantry in action in hazardous circumstances.

=== Commendation for Gallantry ===
Commendation for Gallantry ribbon

Branch	Recipient	Citation
Army	Private Nathan David Bendle	For acts of gallantry in action on 7 September 2011 while deployed on Operation SLIPPER as a member of Mentoring Task Force 3 in Afghanistan.
Army	Private D.	For acts of gallantry in action.
Army	Corporal Scott James Smith †	For acts of gallantry in action on 21 October 2012 while an Explosive Ordnance Reconnaissance Technician in Special Operations Task Group Rotation XVIII in Afghanistan
Army	Private Kyle Anthony Wilson	For acts of gallantry in action on 7 September 2011 while deployed on Operation SLIPPER as a member of Mentoring Task Force 3 in Afghanistan.
Air Force	Sergeant K.	For acts of gallantry in action.

=== Distinguished Service Cross (DSC) ===
Distinguished Service Cross ribbon

Branch	Recipient	Citation
Army	Lieutenant Colonel G.	For distinguished command and leadership in action.
Army	Lieutenant Colonel Christopher R. Smith CSC	For distinguished command and leadership in warlike operations and in action as the Commanding Officer, Mentoring Task Force 3 on Operation SLIPPER in Afghanistan from June 2011 to January 2012.

=== Bar to the Distinguished Service Medal (DSM & Bar) ===
Distinguished Service Medal and Bar ribbon

Branch	Recipient	Citation
Army	Major J. DSM	For distinguished leadership in warlike operations and in action.

=== Distinguished Service Medal (DSM) ===
Distinguished Service Medal ribbon

Branch	Recipient	Citation
Army	Major A.	For distinguished leadership in warlike operations and in action.
Army	Captain A.	For distinguished leadership in warlike operations and in action.
Army	Corporal A.	For distinguished leadership in warlike operations and in action.
Army	Major Anthony Raymond Bennett	For distinguished leadership in warlike operations and in action as the Officer Commanding A Company, Mentoring Task Force 3 on Operation SLIPPER in Afghanistan from June to November 2011.
Army	Major E.	For distinguished leadership in warlike operations and in action.
Army	Corporal P.	For distinguished leadership in warlike operations and in action.
Army	Captain R.	For distinguished leadership in warlike operations and in action.
Army	Major S.	For distinguished leadership in warlike operations and in action.
Army	Colonel David John Smith AM	For distinguished leadership in warlike operations as the Deputy Commander, Combined Team Uruzgan on Operation SLIPPER in Afghanistan from May 2011 to January 2012.

=== Commendation for Distinguished Service ===
Commendation for Distinguished Service ribbon

Branch	Recipient	Citation
Navy	Captain Simon Giuseppe Ottaviano	For distinguished performance of duty in warlike operations as Chief of Staff Headquarters Joint Task Force 633 on Operation SLIPPER from July 2011 to January 2012.
Navy	Commander Andrew Paul Quinn	For distinguished performance of duty in warlike operations as the Commanding Officer, HMAS Toowoomba on Operation SLIPPER from June to October 2011.
Army	Lieutenant Colonel B.	For distinguished performance of duty in warlike operations.
Army	Major Andrew Baker	For distinguished performance of duty in warlike operations as Commander, Brigade Headquarters Operational Mentoring and Liaison Team, Mentoring Task Force 3 on Operation SLIPPER in Afghanistan.
Army	Major Andrew Thomas Cullen	For distinguished performance of duty in warlike operations as the Explosive Ordnance Disposal Troop Commander, Combined Team Uruzgan on Operation SLIPPER from May 2011 to February 2012.
Army	Private Phillip Alan Durham	For distinguished performance of duty in warlike operations and in action as a rifleman with A Company, Mentoring Task Force 3 on Operation SLIPPER in Afghanistan from June 2011 to January 2012.
Army	Major General Michael George Krause	For distinguished performance of duty in warlike operations as the Deputy Chief of Staff - Plans, Headquarters international Joint Command, International Security Assistance Force Afghanistan from March 2011 to February 2012.
Army	Major Benjamin Gerard McLennan	For distinguished performance of duty in warlike operations as the Operations Officer, Mentoring Task Force 3 on Operation SLIPPER from June to November 2011.
Army	Lieutenant Colonel Christopher Gerard Miles	For distinguished performance of duty in warlike operations as the Principle Staff Officer Operations, Headquarters Joint Task Force 633, and as Acting Deputy Commander and Chief of Staff Combined Team Uruzgan on Operation SLIPPER.
Army	Corporal Daniel Brett Miller	For distinguished performance of duty in warlike operations as a corporal mentor, Mentoring Task Force 3 on Operation SLIPPER in Afghanistan from June 2011 to January 2012.
Army	Major R.	For distinguished performance of duty in warlike operations.
Army	Captain T.	For distinguished performance of duty in warlike operations and in action.

=== Bar to the Conspicuous Service Cross (CSC & Bar) ===
Conspicuous Service Cross and Bar ribbon

Branch	Recipient	Citation
Army	Lieutenant Colonel Rolf Audrins CSC	For outstanding achievement as the Staff Officer Grade One, Career Management in the Directorate of Soldier Career Management - Army.
Air Force	Group Captain Christopher Thomas Hanna CSC	For outstanding devotion to duty to the Australian Defence Force as a Legal Officer in the Royal Australian Air Force.

=== Conspicuous Service Cross (CSC) ===
Conspicuous Service Cross ribbon

Branch	Recipient	Citation
Navy	Commander Mitchell Robert Livingstone	For outstanding achievement while Commanding Officer HMAS Pirie engaged in the rescue of survivors from a foundered vessel at Christmas Island on 15 December 2010.
Navy	Captain Christine Ann Clarke	For outstanding achievement as the Commanding Officer of HMAS Kuttabul.
Navy	Commander Paul James Moggach	For outstanding achievement in the performance of duty as the Commanding Officer of 817 Squadron from August 2009 until decommissioning of the Squadron in December 2011.
Navy	Commander Timothy James Standen	For outstanding achievement as the Fleet Aviation Engineer Officer
Army	Lieutenant Colonel Ana Laura Duncan	For outstanding achievement as the Senior Career Adviser in the Directorate of Officer Career Management - Army.
Army	Lieutenant Colonel Arun Lambert	For outstanding achievement as the Director of Legal Review, Office of the Inspector General Australian Defence Force - Canberra.
Army	Lieutenant Colonel Jenelle Margaret Lawson	For outstanding achievement as Staff Officer Plans, Headquarters Defence Force Recruiting for the innovation, development and successful implementation of the Defence Technical Scholarship program during the period from 2007 to 2011.
Army	Colonel John Brendan McLean	For outstanding achievement as Commanding Officer, 16th Air Defence Regiment.
Army	Lieutenant Colonel Saad Imad Omari DSC	For outstanding achievement as Staff Officer Grade One Plans and Staff Officer Grade One Force Preparation in Headquarters 1st Division.
Army	Lieutenant Colonel Bradley Scott Robertson	For outstanding achievement as a logistics Staff Officer within the Directorate of Logistics - Army.
Army	Lieutenant Colonel Matthew Stewart Thomson	For outstanding achievement as a Project Director, Defence Support Group - Capital Facilities and Infrastructure Branch.
Air Force	Wing Commander David Charles Abraham	For outstanding achievement in F-111 weapon system logistic support
Air Force	Group Captain Peter Robert Davies	For outstanding achievement as the Commanding Officer of Number 1 Radar Surveillance Unit.
Air Force	Group Captain Jennifer Karen Lumsden	For outstanding achievement as Chief of Staff, Director General Health Reserves - Air Force and in developing the Military Critical Care Aeromedical Evacuation Capability.
Air Force	Wing Commander Paul Raymond Parolo	For outstanding achievement in the field of Aerospace Engineering in the Royal Australian Air Force.
Air Force	Sergeant Andrew Gordon Wade	For outstanding achievement as the Senior Non-Commissioned Officer-in-Charge of Engine Cell at Number 37 Squadron.

=== Conspicuous Service Medal (CSM) ===
Conspicuous Service Medal ribbon

Branch	Recipient	Citation
Navy	Commander Rodney John Griffiths	For meritorious achievement as Assistant Defence Attaché, Australian Defence Staff, Jakarta.
Navy	Leading Seaman Deakon James Lewis	For meritorious devotion to duty as a Leading Seaman Combat Systems Operator and Tactical Data Link manager in HMAS Sydney
Navy	Petty Officer Jay Pettifer	For meritorious achievement and contribution to the Royal Australian Navy by implementing complex security improvements within Garden Island Defence Precinct.
Navy	Warrant Officer Michael John Quinlan	For meritorious achievement as the Submarine Escape Training Facility Training Officer at HMAS Stirling, Western Australia.
Navy	Petty Officer Luanne Rebecca Rule	For meritorious devotion to duty as the Petty Officer Naval Police Coxswain in the Royal Australian Navy's Recruit School.
Navy	Warrant Officer William James Welman	For meritorious achievement as the Communications Information Systems Category Manager in the Directorate of Navy Category Management.
Army	Major Paul John Bellas	For meritorious achievement as the Chinook Logistics Manager in driving significant reform resulting in increased Chinook capability output and reduced ownership costs to Defence.
Army	Major Steven James Bennett	For meritorious achievement as Staff Officer Grade Two - Information and Communications Technology Projects and Plans, Headquarters Forces Command.
Army	Lieutenant Colonel Scott Rodney Bradford	For meritorious achievement as Staff Officer Grade One Training in Headquarters 2nd Division.
Army	Major r Michael John Buchanan	For meritorious achievement as the Officer Commanding Reinforcement Company, Mentoring Task Force 3 from February 2011 to January 2012.
Army	Corporal D.	For meritorious achievement as the technical operations subject matter expert in support of the Australian Defence Forces Special Operations capability.
Army	Corporal Adam Eagle	For meritorious devotion to duty as a Geomatic Technician providing engineering survey support to the Australian Army.
Army	Sergeant Bradley Norman Foster	For meritorious achievement as acting Company Sergeant Major of C Company and acting Second in Command of Support Company, the 1st Battalion, the Royal Australian Regiment.
Army	Warrant Officer Class One Michael Kenneth Harman	For meritorious achievement as the Technical Quartermaster Sergeant of the 3rd Combat Engineer Regiment.
Army	Major Lloyd Alexander Jensen	For meritorious achievement as the Quartermaster and Battery Commander Combat Service Support Battery, 4th Regiment Royal Australian Artillery in 2011.
Army	Warrant Officer Class Two Kevin John Kennedy	For meritorious devotion to duty as the Warrant Officer Strategic Reporting, Army Headquarters.
Army	Warrant Officer Class Two M.	For meritorious achievement in the field of Australian Army counterinsurgency doctrine and education.
Army	Lieutenant Colonel Bevan Hugh McDonald	For outstanding service as the Staff Officer Grade One Capability, Headquarters Joint Operations Command in pioneering and leading the operational User Requirements process.
Army	Corporal Lee Andrew Newham	For meritorious achievement as a section commander of the 2nd Battalion, the Royal Australian Regiment.
Army	Captain O.	For meritorious achievement as the Regimental Personnel and Administrative Officer.
Army	Warrant Officer Class One Christopher Robin Tuddenham	For meritorious devotion to duty as the Communications Systems Engineer at Headquarters Joint Operations Command.
Army	Major Lisa Therese Weston	For meritorious devotion to duty as the Officer Commanding ECHO Squadron at the Australian Defence Force Academy.
Army	Warrant Officer Class Two Damien Alexander Woolfe	For meritorious achievement as the Explosive Ordnance Disposal Warrant Officer at the Defence Explosive Ordnance Training School.
Air Force	Squadron Leader Daniel Joseph Grealy	For meritorious achievement as the Executive Officer at Number 1 Squadron.
Air Force	Group Captain Ross Keith Jones	For meritorious achievement as the Commanding Officer at Number 1 Recruit Training Unit.
Air Force	Warrant Officer Edward Peter O'Farrell	For meritorious achievement as the Warrant Officer in Charge of the Assisted Learning Centre at the Royal Australian Air Force School of Technical Training.
Air Force	Squadron Leader Sheena Lee Oldridge	For meritorious achievement as the Emerging Projects Development Engineer in Guided Weapons Branch, Explosive Ordnance Division.
Air Force	Warrant Officer Jason Robin Stone	For meritorious achievement as the Warrant Officer Engineering at Number 1 Squadron.
