= Bruce Robinson (disambiguation) =

Bruce Robinson is an English director and actor.

Bruce Robinson may also refer to:

- Bruce Robinson (baseball) (born 1954), American baseball catcher
- Bruce W. Robinson (born 1950), Australian pulmonary physician and cancer immunologist
- Bruce Robinson (endocrinologist), Australian cancer researcher and professor of medicine
- Bruce Robinson, co-owner of the Hawaiian island of Niihau
- Bruce A. Robinson, founder Ontario Consultants on Religious Tolerance

== See also ==
- Bruce Robison (born 1966), American country music singer-songwriter
