= David Marchant =

David Marchant may refer to:

- David Marchant (businessman), Australian executive in the transport industry
- David Marchant (journalist), publisher and editor of OffshoreAlert
- David R. Marchant, glaciologist
