= Anne Simmons =

Australian biomedical engineer

Anne Simmons AM FTSE

Academic background
- Education: University of Queensland University of New South Wales

Anne Simmons is an Australian biomedical engineer. She served as Provost at the University of New South Wales (UNSW) from 2019 to 2023. Her research focused on analysis of blood flow in diseased vessels and the development of biomaterials for implantable devices.

== Education ==
Simmons completed a Bachelor of Engineering (Mechanical) at the University of Queensland, a Master of Biomedical Engineering at UNSW and a PhD in Biomedical Engineering at UNSW.

== Career ==
Simmons worked in the medical devices industry, including with Nucleus and Telectronics, for nearly 20 years. She returned to UNSW to take up the role of associate professor in the Faculty of Engineering. In 2018 she became Pro Vice-Chancellor (Academic Excellence) at UNSW and in 2019 was appointed UNSW's inaugural provost.

In addition to her university role, she is chair of the Advisory Committee on Medical Devices at the Therapeutic Goods Administration (TGA).

== Awards and recognition ==
Simmons was appointed a Member of the Order of Australia in the 2013 Australia Day Honours for "significant service to biomedical engineering, as an academic and administrator". She was elected a Fellow of the Australian Academy of Technology and Engineering in 2015 and is a Fellow of Engineers Australia.
