= Beth Wilson =

Australian public servant

Bethia Wilson is an author and former senior Australian public servant. Best known as Beth Wilson, she held the position of Victoria's Health Services Commissioner between 1997 and 2012. Before that, she worked as the President of Victoria's Mental Health Review Board. She is a well known public speaker, and conducts over 100 speeches and lectures each year. She made headlines in 2007 when she revealed her personal experience with abortion, and urged Victorian MPs to remove abortion from the Crimes Act.

Wilson left school at the age of 15, unable to support herself financially. For several years, she worked in factories. She eventually began night school at RMIT studying science, and then managed to gain entrance to Monash University as a mature age student. She graduated in 1977 with a Bachelor of Arts and a Bachelor of Laws.

In 2003, Wilson was awarded a Centenary Medal for her contribution to Australian health, and holds an honorary doctorate from RMIT. She was inducted into the Victorian Honour Roll of Women in 2008 and was appointed a Member of the Order of Australia in the 2013 Australia Day Honours, recognising her "significant service to the community of Victoria through the provision of dispute resolution in the area of health services".

Wilson teamed up with Penny Webster to form Wilson and Webster Consultancy Services, specializing in complaint handling, grievances and workplace mediation.

In 2020 she published her first novel, The Lost Lovelies Foundation, with Laneway Press. Set in Melbourne, it tells the story of The Lost Lovelies Foundation and its mercurial founder, Anita Hammond-Jones. Wilson is currently working on her second novel, The Pardon.
