= Sally Redman =

Australian public health researcher

Sally Redman AO
- Education: Victoria University of Wellington
- Employer(s): University of Newcastle; New South Wales Cancer Council; National Breast Cancer Centre; Sax Institute

Sally Redman AO is a New Zealand-born Australian public health researcher and chief executive officer of the Sax Institute in Sydney, where she leads the 45 and Up Study, an NSW-wide project with over 260,000 participants responding to questionnaires on healthy ageing.

== Career ==
Redman has a BA in psychology (1978) and a PhD (1982) from Victoria University of Wellington.

She moved to Australia and, in 1984, joined the University of Newcastle as a lecturer in the Faculty of Medicine. In 1994–95 she was employed by the New South Wales Cancer Council. In 1995 she was appointed the inaugural CEO of the National Breast Cancer Centre, where she worked until becoming the inaugural CEO of the Sax Institute in 2002, where she encouraged the use of research evidence in Australia-wide health policy making.

As of 2021, she is also a conjoint professor at the University of Newcastle.

== Honours and recognition ==
Redman was awarded the Centenary Medal in 2001 for "service to the health and welfare of Australian women diagnosed with breast cancer". She was made an Officer of the Order of Australia in the 2013 Australia Day Honours for "distinguished service to public health through leadership in the care of women with breast cancer, contributions to research and higher education and the promotion of relationships between researchers, policy makers and practitioners".

== Selected publications ==
- Steve R Makkar; Abby Haynes; Anna Williamson; Sally Redman (7 March 2018). "Organisational capacity and its relationship to research use in six Australian health policy agencies". PLOS One. 13 (3) e0192528. doi:10.1371/journal.pone.0192528. ISSN 1932-6203. PMC 5841661. PMID 29513669. Wikidata Q52669477.
- Abby Haynes; Samantha J Rowbotham; Sally Redman; Sue E. Brennan; Anna Williamson; Gabriel Moore (10 April 2018). "What can we learn from interventions that aim to increase policy-makers' capacity to use research? A realist scoping review". Health Research Policy and Systems. 16 (1): 31. doi:10.1186/s12961-018-0277-1. ISSN 1478-4505. PMC 5892006. PMID 29631606. Wikidata Q55020549.
- Amanda Dominello; Elizabeth Yano; Emily Klineberg; Sally Redman; Jonathan Craig; Bernadette Brown; Deanna Kalucy; Mary Haines (6 December 2018). "The EXpert PANel Decision (EXPAND) method: a way to measure the impact of diverse quality improvement activities of clinical networks". Public health research & practice. 28 (4). doi:10.17061/phrp2841829. ISSN 2204-2091. PMID 30652190. Wikidata Q91083647.
- Anna Williamson; Steve R Makkar; Sally Redman (30 April 2019). "How was research engaged with and used in the development of 131 policy documents? Findings and measurement implications from a mixed methods study". Implementation Science. 14 (1): 44. doi:10.1186/s13012-019-0886-2. ISSN 1748-5908. PMC 6492336. PMID 31039811. Wikidata Q64079379.
