= David Marchant (businessman) =

Australian businessman

David Marchant AM
- Born: 1954 (age 70–71); Grafton, New South Wales, Australia
- Occupation: Businessman

David Marchant AM (born November 1954) is an Australian railway executive and businessman.

== Biography ==
David Marchant was born on November 1954 in Grafton, New South Wales, Australia. His early career included a period as an adviser to Premier of New South Wales Neville Wran. He became the Deputy Director General for the New South Wales Department of Community Services in 1989, and Group General Manager for Sydney Water in 1993. During this time, he worked as the Managing Director for Australian Water Technologies.

Marchant served as the inaugural Chief Executive Officer (CEO) of the Australian Rail Track Corporation from March 1998 until February 2011.

Marchant was appointed as Managing Director of Lendlease Infrastructure Services and the Managing Director of Lendlease Engineering in 2013, integrating the Abigroup and Baulderstone businesses. In July 2014, he was appointed to the board of Airservices Australia.

Marchant became a Member of the Order of Australia in the 2013 Australia Day Honours list for significant service to the rail industry through national structural reform and infrastructure upgrades.

As of October 2023, Marchant was on the boards of the Port Authority of New South Wales and Queensland Rail.
