= Anne Leadbeater =

Australian bushfire disaster recovery specialist

Anne Leadbeater OAM
- Education: RMIT University
- Known for: Trauma recovery after bushfires

Anne Leadbeater OAM was awarded an Order of Australia medal for services to the community following the 2019 bushfires. She is a fellow of Emergency Media and Public Affairs.

She was acknowledged for her community leadership in recovering from fires, in the aftermath of Black Saturday. She is a national expert on leading recovery for communities who have experienced trauma, particularly from bushfire and are seeking different ways to move forward. She works with communities who are recovering from fire, drought, flood and cyclone in various states in Australia including Queensland, Victoria, New South Wales, and South Australia. In 2014, she led an international team working with the Christchurch Earthquake Appeal for New Zealand Red Cross.

== Black Saturday bushfires and recovery ==
On Saturday 7 February 2009 the Black Saturday bushfires occurred in Victoria, Australia, and 137 people were killed.

In Leadbeater's community, at 4:20 pm fire came, but no warnings were issued. On that day, 27 people died and 85 of the 130 houses were destroyed in a community with a population of 200 people.

Her community was involved in the Strathewen Community Renewal Association (SCRA). The SCRA was awarded the national prize in 2010 for the volunteer section of the Australian Safer Communities Awards. The SCRA was awarded the prize for representing the best practice of bottom-up, community-led recovery.

== Career and community contributions ==
Leadbeater is currently director of "Disaster Recovery Group Leadbeater". She was a community development leader within Murrindindi before and after the Black Saturday bushfires and specialises in recovery from trauma and disaster.

Leadbeater's research has focused on community rebuilding after fire, including how there was a desire for people to be resilient, yet due to the fire, all were equally disempowered.

She has written a review on resilience following disaster, called the "Community Recovery Handbook for the Australian Institute for Disaster Resilience".

Leadbeater wrote "Decisions made by outsiders should not be imposed or forced upon a community; they need to be able to come to their own decisions in their own time. Surely that principle is doubly true of a disaster-affected community." Leadbeater has described how healthy strategies for recovery from fire can include psychological recovery as well as building structures.

"Coupled with the well-intentioned desire to relieve people's sadness by fixing stuff and building stuff, it's not hard to get caught up in a 'fast equals effective' bricks and mortar view of recovery."

She has been involved in community connectedness and how frequency of moving affects disaster recovery, in a project with the Bushfire and Natural Hazards CRC.

== Education ==
In 2007 Leadbeater enrolled in studies at RMIT University for the first time, where she obtained a Master of Social Sciences.

== Awards and recognition ==
- 2009 – Bartercard local hero award
- 2009 – Medal of the Order of Australia
- 2011 – Vice Chancellor's List for Academic Excellence
- 2019 – Keynote address at the International Association of Wildland fire
