= Bruce W. Robinson =

Australian pulmonary physician and cancer immunologist (born 1950)

Bruce William Stanley Robinson is a scientific leader and pulmonary physician working in Perth, Western Australia. He is best known for his work in substantially improving cancer immunotherapy and the diagnosis and outcomes for asbestos cancers. In addition, he has an international reputation for his work and outreach helping fathers and father figures, for the view to improving the outcomes for children. For these activities he has been named Western Australian of the Year, WA Australian of the Year and received an Order of Australia plus a number of international and national scientific awards.

== Early life and education ==
Prof Robinson was born in Western Australia, graduated from the University of Western Australia (UWA) Medical School and then received postgraduate medical training in the UK, where he became a Fellow of the Royal College of Physicians, and in the USA, at the National Institute of Health in Maryland, where he completed a research doctorate. He chose to return to Australia to participate in and contribute to Australian professional and community life. He thus has medical and research qualifications from Australia, the UK and the USA (MBBS, MD, FRACP, FRCP, DTM&H, FCCP) and has been a practicing consultant hospital physician since completing his doctorate.

== Career and Research ==
Cancer neoantigen research and translation

Prof Robinson pioneered the field of tumor antigen cross presentation, showing that tumours continually engaged with the immune system, dispelling the widely held 'Ignorance Hypothesis'. Those early observations have driven many new approaches to cancer immunotherapy.

He is the leader/co leader of teams studying the immunology and immunotherapy of cancers using advanced models, genomics, immunomics, immunopeptidomics and AI for the discovery of neoantigens that might generate powerful anti-cancer immune responses with a view to translation in cancer patients.

His team have studied cancer neo-antigen vaccines for >20 years, pioneering many discoveries in this field, chemotherapy synergies (Nat Rev Cancer), neo-antigens induced by natural human carcinogens (OncoImm) and is leading a clinical trial program known as ATTAC (Antigen Targeted Therapy Against Cancer) using novel neoantigen vaccines in patients with cancer.

Asbestos disease research

He established the Australian NHMRC Centre of Research Excellence, the National Centre for Asbestos Related Diseases (NCARD). He was Director of this Centre for 11 years. NCARD has led many firsts in the field including the first human and mouse mesothelioma cell lines, first asbestos-induced tumour model, genomic identification of the first tumour neo-antigens induced by natural carcinogens and the first reliable blood biomarker for mesothelioma. The work of NCARD has improved treatment response rates in mesothelioma patients from around 8% to over 40%. He was co-chair of the international ICGC-TCGA mesothelioma gene sequencing program.

He also established a medical clinic to care compassionately for asbestos victims, including those suffering from the deadly epidemic cancer mesothelioma. Over the past 30 years he has cared for thousands of these patients, as well as their families. From this he used this experience and developed a new UWA Medical School Course for teaching students' communications skills for those suffering with cancer and later publishing a book "Behind the tears" as well as articles on grief and dying

He has published over 260 scientific papers, 40 invited book chapters and invited reviews in the New England Journal of Medicine, Nature Reviews, and The Lancet plus 2 Scientific books.

Research leadership roles

He has been Chairman of the WA State Health Research Advisory Council and the Future Health WA committee, and a former board member of the Keogh Institute and the Bernie Banton Foundation.

He co-founded the International Mesothelioma Interest Group (IMIG) in 1990 to bring together all of the world's leading scientists & clinicians in the field of asbestos cancer. This has become the peak international body and meets biennially.

He was also a founding member of the WA Institute for Medical Research (now the Perkins Institute).

He served on the Asbestos Management Review Committee under the jurisdiction of the Minister for Workplace Relations and has been or is a member of committees/Boards for the Australian Lung Foundation, Keogh Institute, Australian Cancer Foundation, WA Institute for Medical Research; SCGH Research Advisory Committee; UWA Faculty, PMH, Clinical Oncology Society of Australia, plus numerous NHMRC committees.

== Humanitarian Work and The Fathering Project ==
Professor Robinson responded to the systemic youth crises of mental health, obesity, poor educational attitudes, cyberbullying and lack of resilience by developing a data-backed national program, focussing on a statistically clear 'missing factor', high quality father/father figure input. The Fathering Project that he started 25 years ago has grown from a UWA initiative into a powerful national harm-prevention asset:

- National Program for dads and father figures: The Fathering Project operates hundreds of active "Dads Groups" across schools, ELCs, workplaces and community groups in every Australian state and territory along with a wide digital outreach reaching hundreds of thousands. His work has also had international impact in ~7 countries.
- Measurable Youth Harm Prevention: This framework directly engages over 80,000 father figures annually, impacting >150,000 children nationwide, with independent evaluations proving the initiative already has impacts on all of the above challenges.
- Accessible Community tools: He created accessible tools, authoring several best-selling books, with all royalties channelled back into funding this work plus helpful online information, eg. the 'tips4dads' YouTube channel.
- EDICT Program - in addition, concerned about the high death rate from COVID-19 in multicultural communities, he led a group delivering digital information in 17 different languages.

For the above work he was awarded the Men's Health network and Impact100 awards.

International Humanitarian Leadership

His service to humanity has extended, over the past 20 years, directly into help for vulnerable neighbouring Indo-Pacific communities:

- Compassionate Disaster Deployment: He has personally served as a doctor at the coalface of some of the biggest disasters in the region, from the Sumatran tsunami through to the more recent Palu earthquake and tsunami.
- Building International Disaster Response Capacity: By co-founding the International Skills and Training Institute in Health (ISTIH), he established self-sustaining disaster medicine training hubs in 3 countries.
- For this work he was a co-recipient of the EY Community Entrepreneur of the Year award (WA).

== Awards since 2013 ==
- The Fathering Project – Lifetime Achievement Award, 2023.
- Mens Health network award - for contributions to men's health through fathering
- Cancer Council WA – Researcher Career Achievement Award, 2022.
- Impact100 Award - Named as the Generous Australian recipient, 2021.
- American Association Network Award – for Cancer Research (AACR), Team Science Award, 2020.
- Irving Selikoff Lifetime Achievement Award of the International Asbestos Awareness Organisation, 2017.
- Winner of the iMig Advancement Award, 2016.
- Royal Australasian College of Physicians (RACP) 75th Anniversary Award, 2014.
- Western Australian of the Year in 2013
- WA Australian of the Year/finalist for the Australian of the Year award 2014.
- International scientific award - the Wagner Medal
- National awards includes the Australian Medical Association, Thoracic Society and Royal Australasian College of Physicians medals, the Premier's Science award and the Saint award.
- Order of Australia (Member), 2013.
- Three UWA Teacher-of-the-Year awards

== Selected publications ==
- Robinson, Bruce W.S.; Lake, Richard A. (13 October 2005). "Advances in Malignant Mesothelioma". New England Journal of Medicine. 353 (15): 1591–1603. doi:10.1056/NEJMra050152. PMID 16221782.
- Robinson, Bruce W.S.; Lake, Richard A. (May 2005). "Immunotherapy and chemotherapy — a practical partnership". Nature Reviews Cancer. 5 (5): 397–405. doi:10.1038/nrc1613. PMID 15864281. S2CID 23526534.
- Robinson, Bruce W. S.; Dick, Ian M.; Creaney, Jenette; Redwood, Alec J. (31 December 2022). "What's next in cancer immunotherapy? - The promise and challenges of neoantigen vaccination". OncoImmunology. 11 (1). doi:10.1080/2162402X.2022.2038403. PMC 8855878. PMID 35186441.
- Addala, Venkateswar.; Newell, Felicity; Pearson, John V.; Redwood, Alec; Robinson, Bruce W; Creaney, Jenette; Waddell, Nicola (31 October 2023). "Computational immunogenomic approaches to predict response to cancer immunotherapies". Nature Reviews Clinical Oncology. 21 (1): 28–46. doi:10.1038/s41571-023-00830-6. PMID 37907723.
