= Anna Scott =

Anna Scott may refer to:

- Anna Scott, a character played by Julia Roberts in the film Notting Hill
- Anna Kay Scott (1838–1923), American medical missionary in India and China
- Anna Page Scott (1863–1925), American Impressionist painter and educator

== See also ==
- Ann Scott (disambiguation)
- Anne Scott (disambiguation)
