= Anna Huntington Stanley =

American painter (1864–1907)

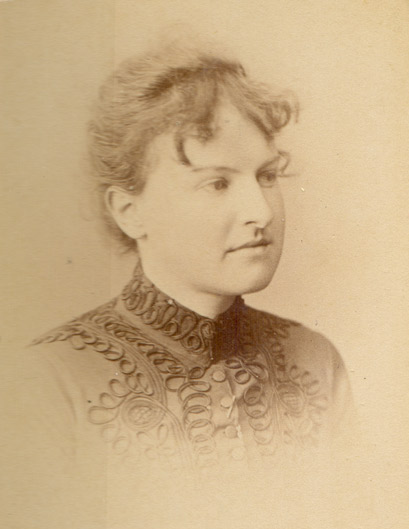
- Born: April 20, 1864; Yellow Springs, Ohio, US
- Died: February 25, 1907 (aged 42); Chester, Pennsylvania, US
- Education: Pennsylvania Academy of the Fine Arts, Académie Julian, and Académie Colarossi
- Movement: American Impressionism
- Spouse: Willard Ames Holbrook
- Children: 2, including Willard

Anna Huntington Stanley (April 20, 1864 – February 25, 1907) was an American Impressionist artist.

Stanley's work can be found in numerous institutional collections, including The Smithsonian American Art Museum, the Telfair Museum of Art, the Taft Museum of Art, the Grand Rapids Art Museum, and exhibited in the Singer Museum.

== Early life ==
Stanley was born in Yellow Springs, Ohio, on April 20, 1864, to David Sloane Stanley, a US Army Brigadier General, and Anna Maria Wright. She and her six siblings were primarily cared for by their mother. Due to David Sloane Stanley's military career, the Stanley family moved several times after the end of the Civil War and lived in South Dakota, Detroit (1874), New York City (1876), Texas (1884), and Washington, D.C.

From 1878 to 1882, Stanley attended the Buffalo Female Academy in New York. There, she received instruction from Ammi Merchant Farnham, an American painter known for his landscapes. Some of Farham's influence can be seen in Stanley's later work.

In 1882, Stanley moved to Philadelphia to continue her education at the Pennsylvania Academy of the Fine Arts, where she spent three years attending anatomy lectures and studying life drawing and sculpture under the artists Thomas Eakins and Thomas Poloock Anshutz. There, she met the artists Anna Page Scott, Ida C. Haskell, Susan J. Moody, and Pauline Dohn Rudolph ("Lena").

== European years ==
In 1887, Stanley traveled with her mother and Pauline Dohn Rudolph to Venice and Paris. In Paris, she enrolled in the Académie Julian alongside many of her former classmates at the Pennsylvania Academy of the Fine Arts. At the Académie, Stanley was taught by Gustave Clarence Rodolphe Boulanger and Jules-Joseph Lefebvre. Surviving family correspondence sheds light on Stanley's experiences, including details on other artists' methodologies and critiques she received from her instructors. For example, Stanley wrote in one letter that she received "stern criticisms" but recounted that her instructors were "fair and instructive."

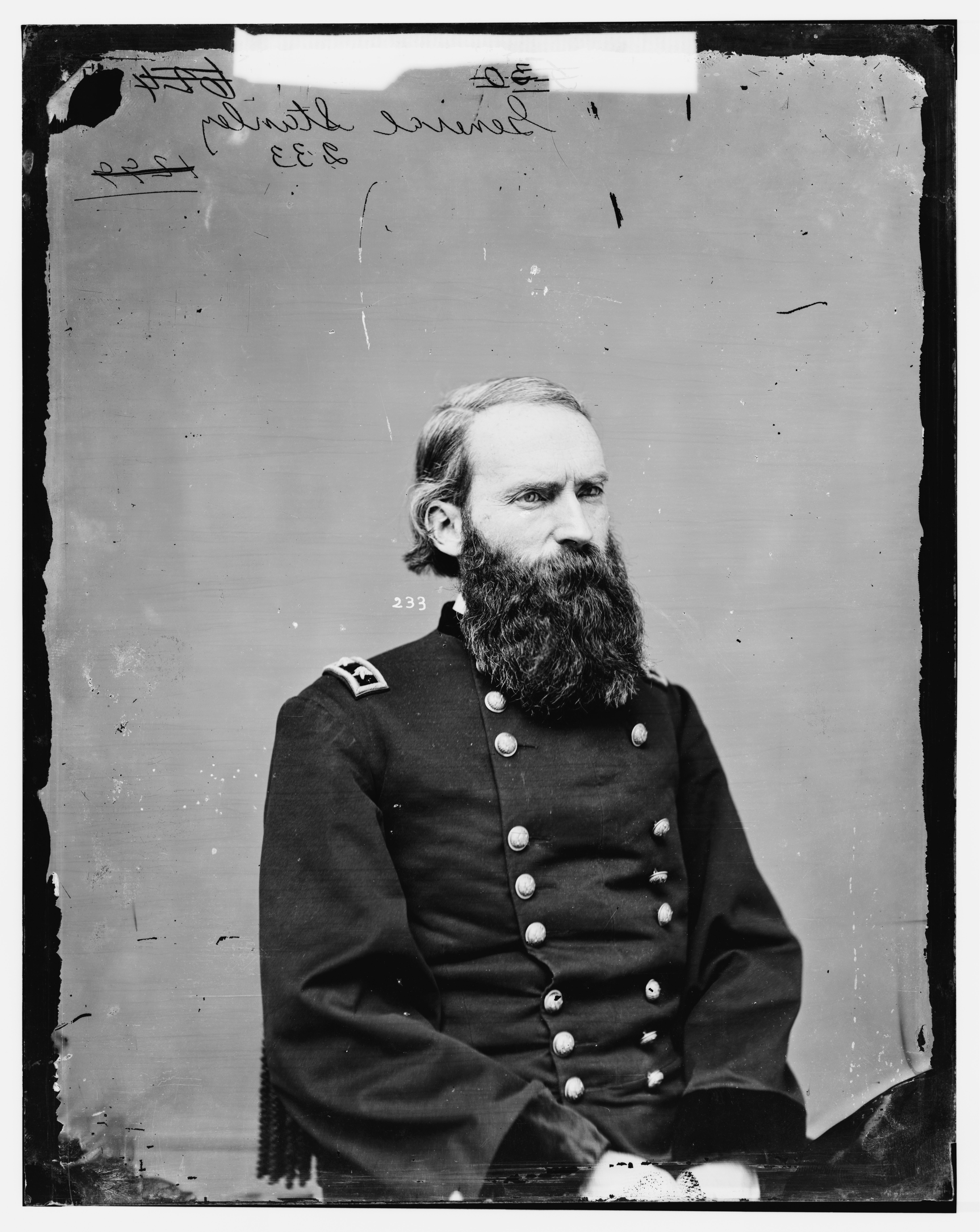
Anna's father, General David Sloane Stanley.

In the summer of 1888, Stanley traveled to Rijsoord, a small, isolated town in the Netherlands, with a group of friends and classmates that included Ida C. Haskell, Pauline Dohn Randolph, Alice Kellogg, and Page Scott. While there, she stayed with the cousins of John H. Vanderpoel, an art teacher at the School of the Art Institute of Chicago who traveled to Rijsoord with the Académie Julian students to paint and teach. In Rijsoord, Stanley primarily painted scenes of Dutch farmers and laborers, women and children, views of river scenes, dikes, and wide-open landscapes.

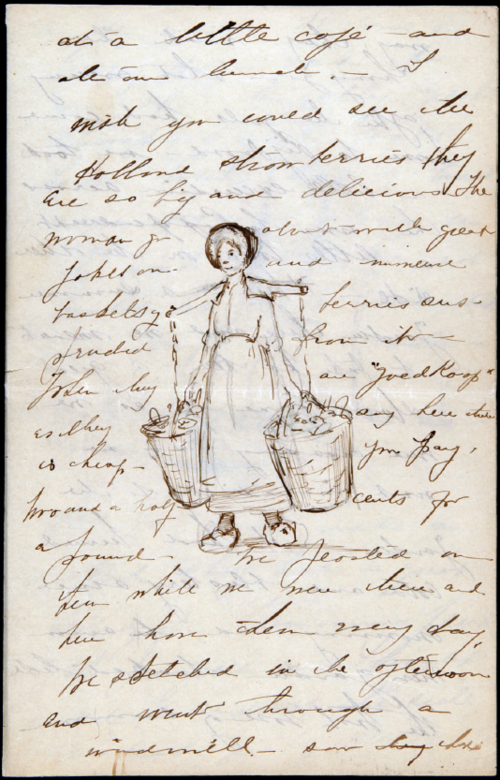
Page from a letter postmarked July 2, 1888, to Stanley's parents, with a sketch for later oil painting "Dutch Milk Maid"

In fall 1888, Stanley returned to Paris and enrolled at the Académie Colarossi, where she received instruction from the artists Jean-André Rixens and Gustave-Claude-Etienne Courtois. In May 1889, Stanley's painting, Au commencement et à al fin, was selected for exhibition at the Paris Salon, and in June, she returned to Rijsoord for the summer along with many of her classmates. She stayed in Rijsoord until November of that year.

== Later years ==
Stanley returned to San Antonio, Texas, in November 1889. In 1891, the Detroit Museum of Fine Arts included three of her paintings in the First Annual Exhibition of American Art. By this time, Stanley had become more well-known, and various institutions had exhibited her artwork. She continued to produce works over the next several years and exhibited at the National Academy of Design, The Boston Art Club, and the Society of Washington Artists. Her work was also included in an exhibition in Washington, D.C., for the Grand Army of the Republic, a veterans’ group formed after the Civil War.

In June 1895, at her brother David's graduation from West Point Military Academy, Stanley met Lieutenant Willard Ames Holbrook, whom she would later marry. Later that month, Stanley made her last trip to Rijsoord and stayed for five months. Upon her return to the United States in November 1895, she continued to have her paintings featured in exhibitions, including at the Veerhoff Galleries in Washington, D.C. In October 1896, Stanley married Lieutenant Holbrook and subsequently moved to his post at Fort Grant, Arizona. In 1897, she exhibited The Spinning Wheel at the Society of Washington Artists, Cosmos Club, Washington, D.C., which was the last known exhibition of her work during her lifetime.

Stanley gave birth to her first son, Willard Ames Holbrook Jr., in May 1898, and April 1900, gave birth to another son, David Stanley Holbrook. Due to her husband's position in the army, Stanley and her family frequently moved, including to Chickamauga, Georgia (1898), Cuba (1898), and Fort Stevens, Oregon (1899). In 1900, Lieutenant Holbrook was stationed in the Philippines. Stanley and her sons stayed in Washington with her father, joining her husband in the Philippines a year later. In 1902, Holbrook and Stanley visited Japan and Korea during their residence on the island of Panay, a trip that influenced Stanley's subsequent artwork. The family returned to America in February 1903 and lived at Fort Huachuca in Arizona and then at Fort Whipple, Arizona, from 1903 to 1905. In 1905, Lieutenant Holbrook received orders to teach at the Pennsylvania Military College in Chester, Pennsylvania.

Stanley died on February 25, 1907, aged 42, of pneumonia, at her home in Chester, Pennsylvania. She was buried at the United States Soldiers' and Airmen's Home National Cemetery in Washington, D.C, where her mother and father were buried in 1895 and 1902, respectively.

== Exhibitions ==
- May 1, 1888: Portrait de Mme. E. H…: --fusain (charcoal drawing), Paris Salon.
- May 1, 1889: Au commencement et à la fin (also known as At each end of the Thread), Paris Salon.
- April 10 – May 17, 1890: Au commencement et à la fin and Girl Stirring Fire (also known as Dutch Girl Stirring a Fire), National Academy of Design, Annual Exhibition, New York.

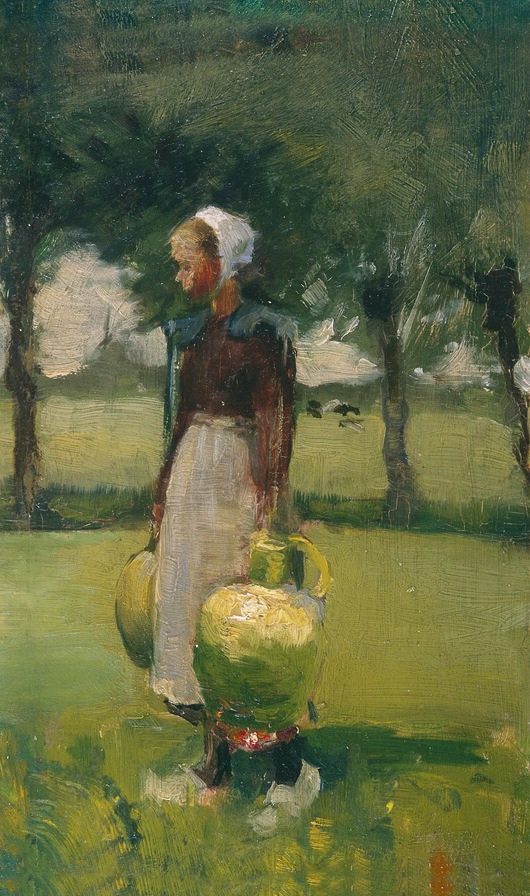
The Milkmaid (Study), 1888–1889

- June 8 – 27, 1891: Dutch Girl Stirring a Fire, Bringing Home the Milk (also known as The Milk Maid), Little French Sisters (also known as Two Children In Cart and The French Sisters), Detroit Museum of Art (now the Detroit Institute of the Arts), First Annual Exhibit of American Art, Detroit.
- July 5, 1891: Brevet-Maj-General David Stanley, O’Brien Galleries Chicago.
- November 21 – December 17, 1892: Busy Bee at the National Academy of Design, Autumn Exhibition, New York, NY (currently missing).
- January 20 – Feb. 17, 1894: Study of Girl (also called Girl Reading), Boston Art Club, Boston, MA.
- April 2 – May 12, 1894: Study of Girl, National Academy of Design Annual Exhibition, New York, NY.
- April 9 – 14, 1894: Portrait of a West Point Cadet (also called Cadet [portrait of David Sheridan Stanley]), Society of Washington Artists at the Cosmos Club, Washington, DC.
- December 10 – 15, The Milk Maid, Two Children In Cart Girl Reading, Grand Art Loan Exhibition, Washington, DC.
- December 23, 1895 – January 11, 1896: Harvest – Holland (also called Girl Carrying Sheaves) at the National Academy of Design, Autumn Exhibition, New York, NY.
- March 2 – 7, 1896: Heather-covered Dunes, A North Holland Peasant, Harvest and The Hopeful Fisherman (also called The Lone Fisherman).
- April 26, 1896: Summer (also called Dutch Bride), Sand Sifter (also called Girl with a Winnowing Basket), The Road (also called Road by a Canal), The Windmill (also called Landscape with Windmills and Road by a Canal), and The Lone Fisherman (also called The Hopeful Fisherman), Veerhoff Galleries, Washington, DC.
- April 5 – 10, 1897: The Spinning Wheel at the Society of Washington Artists, Cosmos Club, Washington, DC.

== Gallery ==
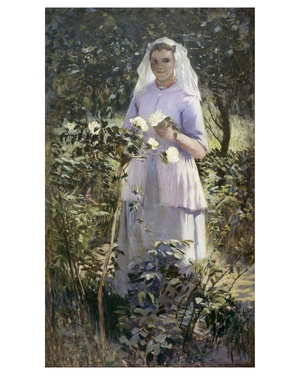
Summer, 1895

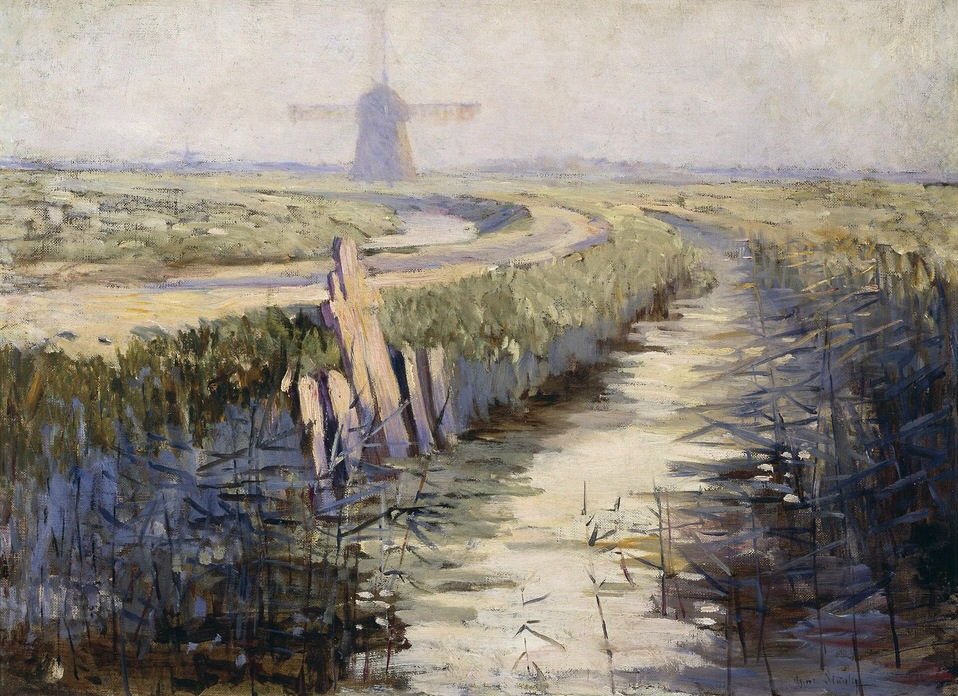
Road By A Canal, 1895

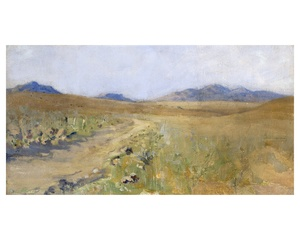
Arizona Landscape, 1896–98

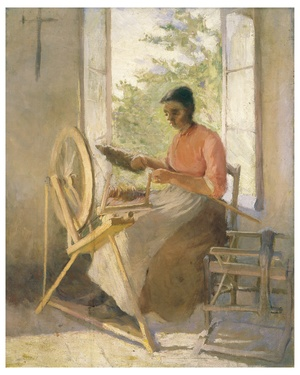
Girl Spinning, 1896–97
