= Cedar Valley, Ohio =

Unincorporated community in Ohio, U.S.

Coordinates: 40°52′20″N 82°01′29″W

Cedar Valley is an unincorporated community in Wayne County, in the U.S. state of Ohio.

== History ==
A post office called Cedar Valley was established in 1841, the name was changed to Cedarvalley in 1895, and the post office closed in 1903. Cedar Valley was named for the valley of Cedar Run creek.

== Notable person ==
David S. Stanley, a Union Army general during the American Civil War, was born at Cedar Valley in 1828.
