= Poleň =

- Municipality
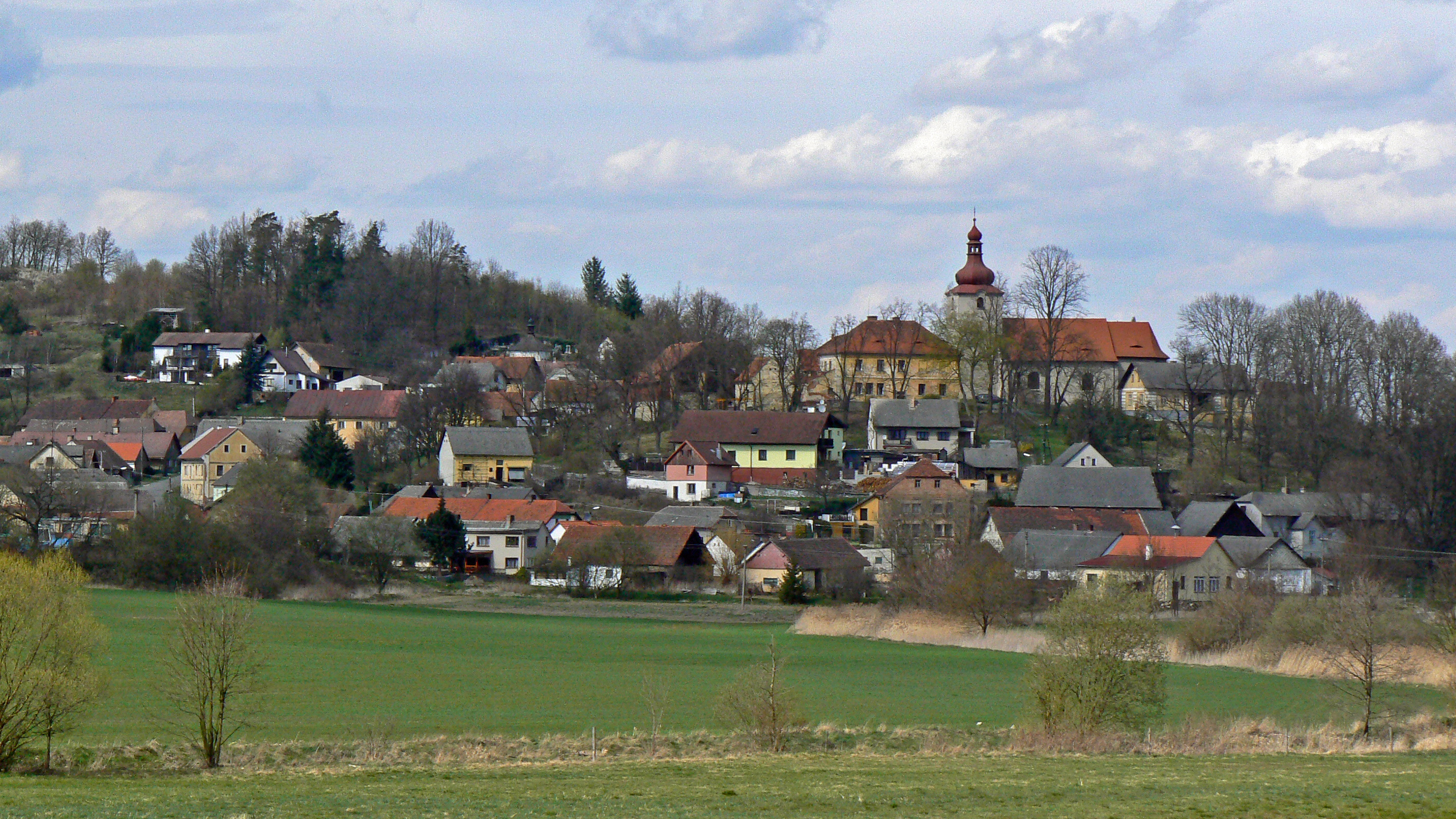
- General view

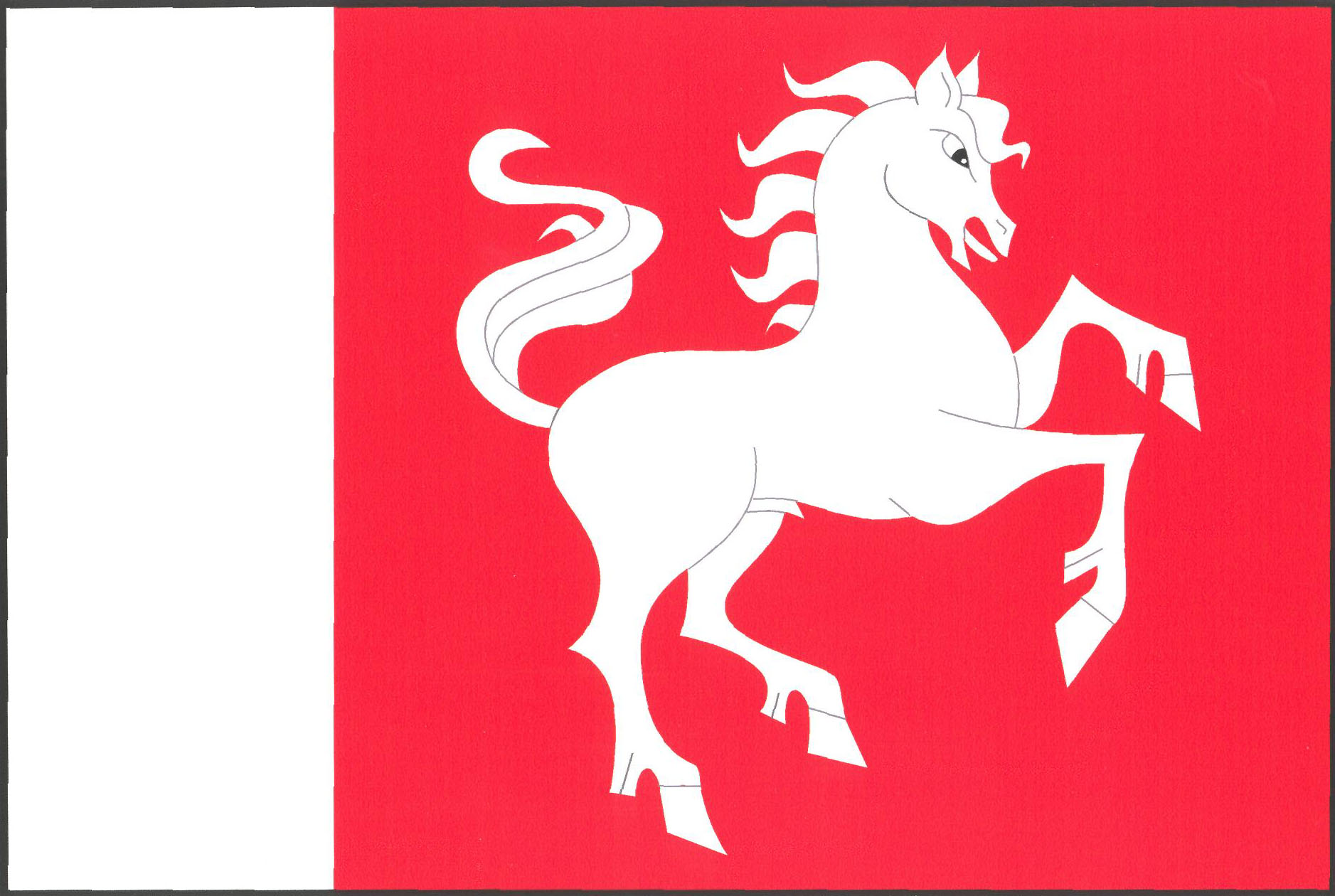
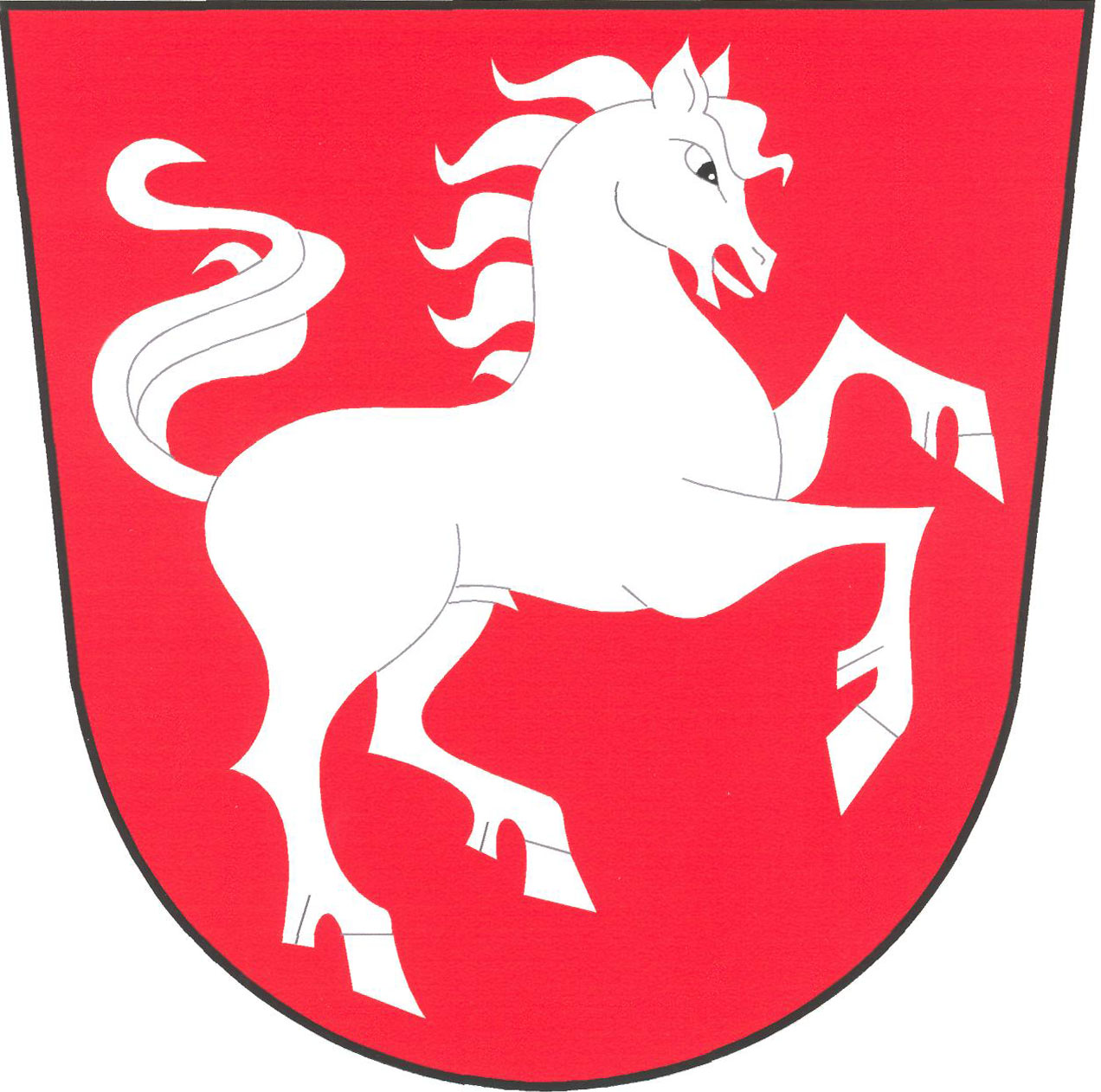
- Flag Coat of arms

- Location in the Czech Republic
- Coordinates: 49°25′30″N 13°10′36″E
- Country: Czech Republic
- Region: Plzeň
- District: Klatovy
- First mentioned: 1245

Area
  - Total: 17.66 km^{2} (6.82 sq mi)
- Elevation: 458 m (1,503 ft)

Population (2026-01-01)
  - Total: 297
  - Density: 16.8/km^{2} (43.6/sq mi)
- Time zone: UTC+1 (CET)
  - Summer (DST): UTC+2 (CEST)
- Postal code: 339 01
- Website: www.polen.cz

Poleň is a municipality and village in Klatovy District in the Plzeň Region of the Czech Republic. It has about 300 inhabitants. The village of Poleň is well preserved and is protected as a village monument zone.

== Administrative division ==
Poleň consists of five municipal parts (in brackets population according to the 2021 census):

- Poleň (134)
- Mlýnec (38)
- Poleňka (26)
- Pušperk (36)
- Zdeslav (59)

== Geography ==
Poleň is located about 8 kilometres (5 mi) northwest of Klatovy and 37 km (23 mi) southwest of Plzeň. It lies in the Švihov Highlands, in the valley of the Poleňka Stream. The highest point is the peak of Velký Bítov at 713 m (2,339 ft) above sea level, located on the southern municipal border.

== History ==
The first written mention of Poleň is in a document of Queen Kunigunde of Hohenstaufen from 1245, where Blažej of Poleň is recorded as a witness.

The history of the village was then connected with the Pušperk Castle, which was first mentioned in 1266 and founded shortly before. It was conquered and destroyed before 1434. The castle was repaired between 1465 and 1473, but in 1473 it was demolished again and definitely became a ruin.

== Demographics ==
Historical population

Year	Pop.	±%
1869	1,156	—
1880	1,191	+3.0%
1890	1,096	−8.0%
1900	1,010	−7.8%
1910	1,003	−0.7%

Year	Pop.	±%
1921	958	−4.5%
1930	888	−7.3%
1950	626	−29.5%
1961	531	−15.2%
1970	477	−10.2%

Year	Pop.	±%
1980	382	−19.9%
1991	329	−13.9%
2001	272	−17.3%
2011	286	+5.1%
2021	293	+2.4%

Source: Censuses

== Transport ==
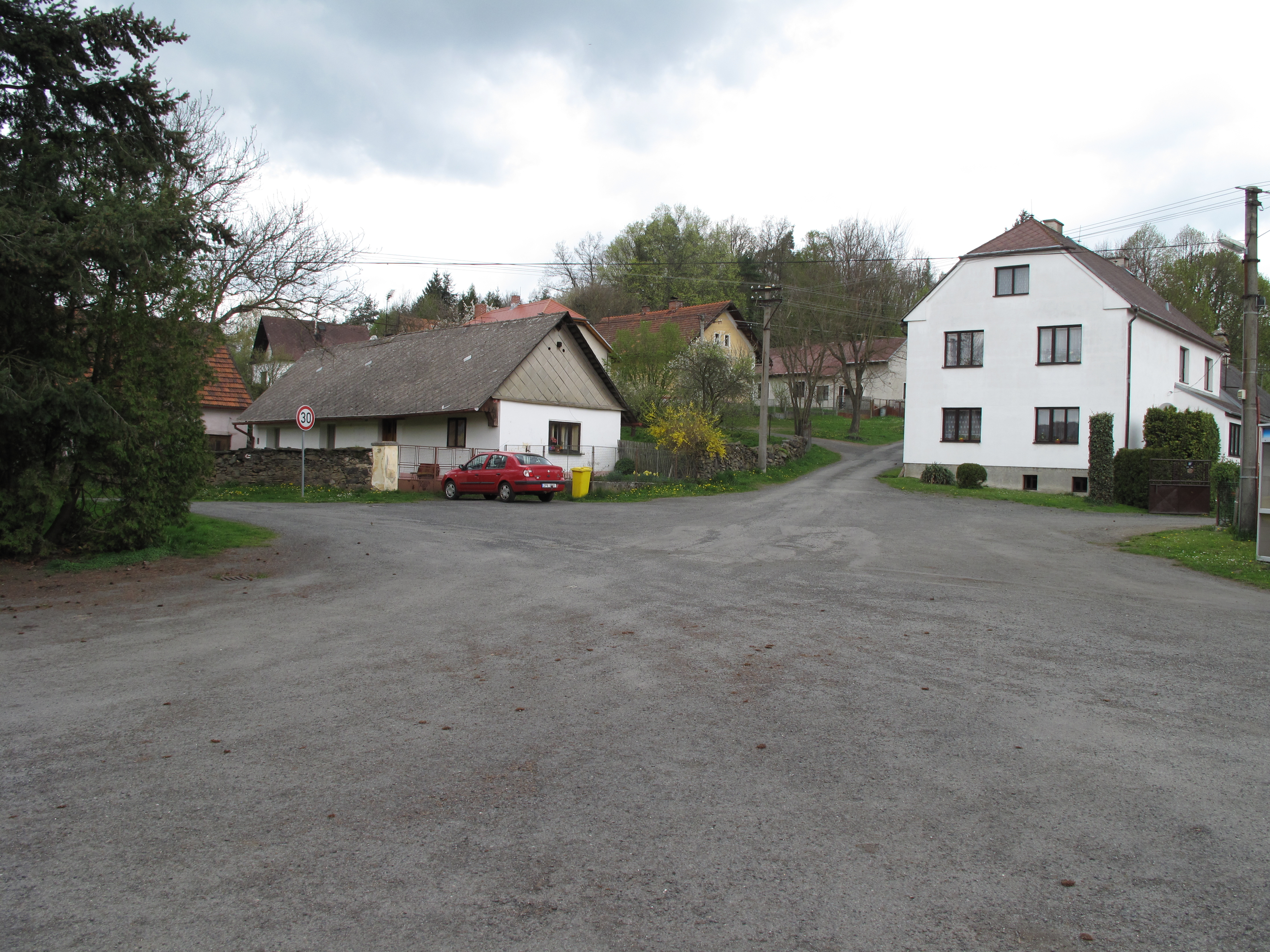
Centre of Poleň

There are no railways or major roads passing through the municipality.

== Sights ==
The main landmark of Poleň is the Church of All the Saints. It dates from the 14th century. It has valuable oil painting of Madonna with Child from the 16th century. Behind the church is the ruin of the Church of Saint Margaret, which was abolished in 1786. Other sacral monuments include the Chapel of Saint Salvador, and the Chapel of Saint John of Nepomuk in Zdeslav.

== Notable people ==
- Abraham Klauber (1831–1911), American entrepreneur
