= Ammi Farnham =

American painter (1845–1922)

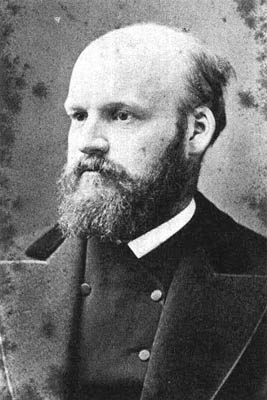
Ammi Farnham

Ammi Merchant Farnham (January 13, 1845, Silver Creek, New York - July 20, 1922, San Diego) was an American painter; primarily of landscapes, but he also did portraits and etchings. Together with Charles Arthur Fries, Alice Ellen Klauber and Arthur Putnam, he was among the first serious artists to work in the San Diego area.

== Biography ==
His father, Horatio Nelson Farnham (1805-1883), was a businessman who served as an agent for the local Cattaraugus Reservation. The nearby city of Farnham may have been named after Horatio, but some sources give the namesake as LeRoy Farnham; probably a relative.

He began his formal artistic training at the age of twelve. By 1862, when the Buffalo Academy of Fine Arts was created, he may have been a student there. In the 1870s, he went to Germany and enrolled at the Academy of Fine Arts, Munich where his instructors included Wilhelm von Kaulbach and Karl von Piloty. He also studied with Frank Duveneck, a precocious American-born painter who was three years his junior. He returned home in 1877.

He decided to settle in Buffalo. Shortly after, he met an English-born singer named Carrie Coombs. They were married in 1878. From then until 1881, he taught painting and drawing at the Buffalo Female Academy. He also served two terms as a curator and two terms as Secretary at his old alma mater, the Academy of Fine Arts.

From 1882 to 1885, they lived in Newburgh, then moved to California. At first, they lived in San Francisco then, around 1889, settled in San Diego; building a house where they lived until 1910, when all the children had left home. Carrie died in 1914. During this time he maintained his ties to Buffalo, however, and stopped there whenever he was going to or from Europe. He also held frequent exhibits at the Albright-Knox Art Gallery, which had been created by members of the Academy.

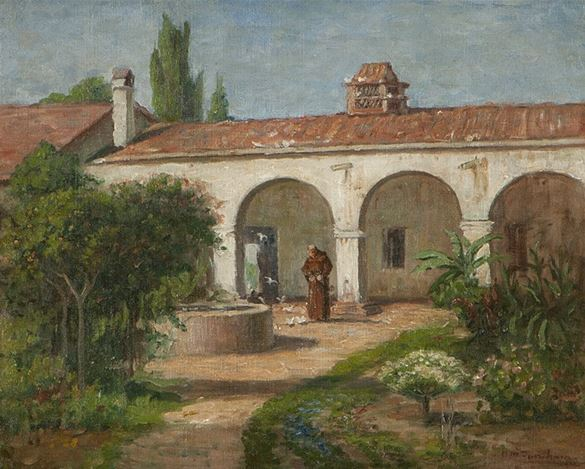
Mission San Juan Capistrano

His most important exhibit was at the Panama–California Exposition in 1915. The San Diego Art Guild was created at that time and he became its first President.

In 1921, he developed a heart condition and succumbed to it the following year. A memorial exhibit was held a few months later.

His works may be seen at the Albright-Knox Gallery and the San Diego Museum of Art, among others.
