= Master of the Sword =

West Point academy head of physical education

The Master of the Sword, or MOS, is the head of the Department of Physical Education and the director of the program of physical instruction at the United States Military Academy at West Point. This position is unique in that the physical program at the academy is both academic and non-academic. Some of the courses are taught in a classroom or laboratory environment and some elements of the physical program are stand-alone testing and non-tested events that must be completed by all cadets during their time at the academy. The first Swordmaster was Pierre Thomas, appointed by Congress in 1814. There have been 27 Masters of the Sword since 1814. Despite its position as a department head since 1948, the Master of the Sword was not made a member of the Academic Board at West Point until 1974, with the appointment of Colonel James L. Anderson. The only woman to serve as MOS was COL Maureen LeBoeuf, serving 1997–2004. The current master of the sword, serving since 2015, is Colonel Nicholas Gist.

== Masters of the Sword ==
Name	Rank	Years
Pierre Thomas	Civilian	1814–1825
Pierre Tranque	Civilian	1825–1827
Louis S. Simon	Civilian	1827–1832
N. Albert Jumel	Civilian	1832–1837
Ferdinand Dupare	Civilian	1837–1840
H.G. Boulet	Civilian	1840–1843
Henry C. Wayne	First lieutenant	1843–1846
Patrice de Janon	Civilian	1846–1857
Antone Lorentz	Civilian	1858–1882
Edward S. Farrow	First lieutenant	1882–1884
Herman Koehler	Lieutenant colonel	1885–1923
Benjamin F. Hoge	Major	Jan–Jul 1924
Cuthbert P. Stearns	Major	1924–1927
Edward L. Kelly	Major	1927–1930
Clovis E. Byers	First lieutenant	Mar–Jun 1930
Harold M. Rayner	Major	1930–1934
William M. Miley	Captain	Apr–Jun 1934
Willard Ames Holbrook Jr.	Captain	1934–1938
George W. Smythe	Captain	1938–1940
John W. Harmony	Colonel	1940–1943
Carl F. Fritzsche	Lieutenant colonel	1943–1944
Francis M. Greene	Colonel	1944–1953
Edwin A. Machen	Lieutenant colonel	1952–1953
Frank J. Kobes, Jr.	Colonel	1953–1974
James L. Anderson	Colonel	1974–1997
Maureen LeBoeuf	Colonel	1997–2004
Gregory L. Daniels	Colonel	2004–2015
Nicholas Gist	Colonel	2015–2026
