= Willard Ames Holbrook Jr. =

United States Army general (1898–1986)

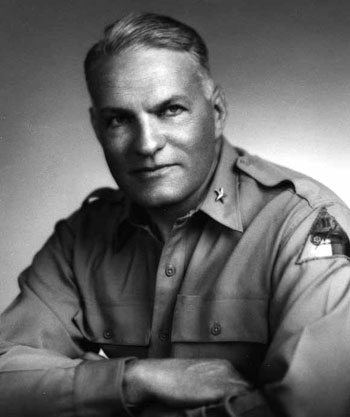
- Brigadier General Willard A. Holbrook Jr.
- Born: May 31, 1898; Fort Grant, Arizona, U.S.
- Died: July 1, 1986 (aged 88); New York, New York, U.S.
- Relatives: MG Willard Ames Holbrook (Father); MG Lucius Roy Holbrook (Uncle)
- Military career
- Allegiance: United States
- Branch: United States Army
- Service years: 1918–1946
- Rank: Brigadier General
- Nickname: "Hunk"
- Commands: 11th Armored Division
- Conflicts: World War II: Rhineland; Ardennes-Alsace; Central Europe
- Awards: Silver Star (2); Legion of Merit; Bronze Star Medal

Willard Ames Holbrook Jr. (May 31, 1898 – July 1, 1986) was a brigadier general in the United States Army. He served as the commander of Combat Command A of the 11th Armored Division during World War II and as Master of the Sword at United States Military Academy between years 1934–1938.

== Family ==
Holbrook was born on May 31, 1898, at Fort Grant, Arizona. His father, Willard Ames Holbrook, was a career Army officer who achieved the rank of major general. His mother, Anna Huntington Stanley, was a painter and the daughter of David S. Stanley, a Union general during the Civil War. Holbrook's mother died when he was eight.

== Early military career ==
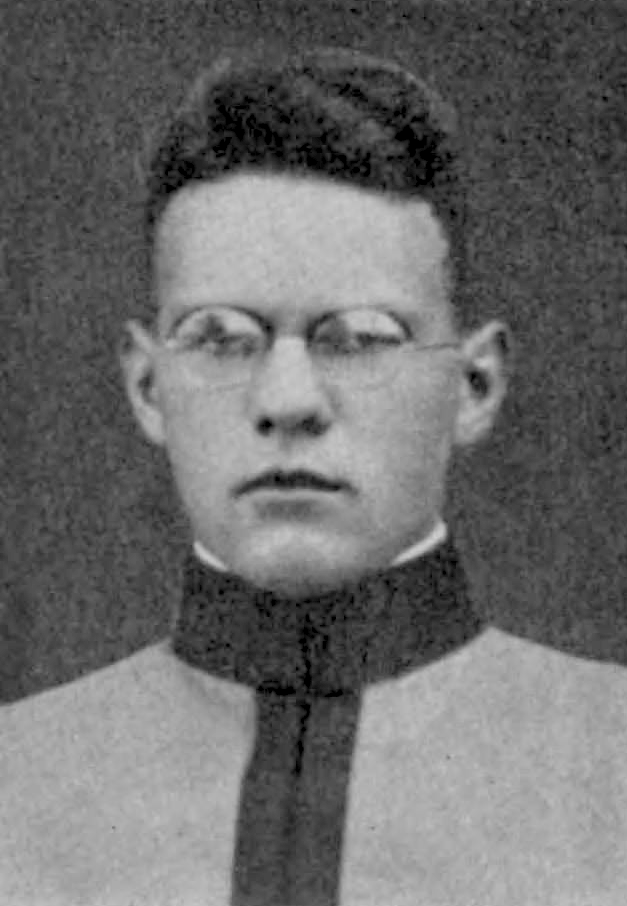
At West Point in 1918

Holbrook Jr. graduated from the United States Military Academy on November 1, 1918. He was commissioned second lieutenant in cavalry on the same date and was assigned to the 10th Cavalry Regiment. Before he was sent to the 10th Cavalry stationed at Fort Huachuca, Arizona, Holbrook Jr. was assigned for additional Infantry training course to Infantry School at Fort Benning, Georgia. In February 1919, he finally finished the course and was transferred to the 10th Cavalry.

In July 1919, Holbrook was sent overseas and assigned to Occupation Duties in Germany. He served first with 1st Division at Ehrenbreitstein Fortress and then with the same unit in Coblenz. There he met his future wife, Helen Hoyle Herr, daughter of future Major General John K. Herr, granddaughter of Brigadier General Eli D. Hoyle, and great-granddaughter of Brigadier General René Edward De Russy. They were married in Washington, D.C., on June 7, 1930. They had three children:

- Joanne Stanley Holbrook, wife of George Patton IV.
- Willard Ames Holbrook, III
- Marian Herr Holbrook

Holbrook returned to the United States in November 1922 and was assigned to the 3rd Cavalry Regiment at Fort Myer, Virginia, where he commanded Troop F. In September 1923, Hunk was assigned for Cavalry School at Fort Riley, Kansas, where he graduated in July 1924.

Maybe most significant period of his career was in 1934, when he was appointed Master of the Sword at United States Military Academy. In this capacity, Holbrook Jr. was responsible for the physical education of Cadets. He also established physical standards, which are used today. He served in this capacity until mid-1938.

During World War II, Holbrook served with the 11th Armored Division, and accepted the surrender of Linz, Austria. He commanded the 12th Armored Division from July 1945, until it was inactivated on December 3, 1945. He died in New York in 1986

== Awards ==
Here is Brigadier General Holbrook's ribbon bar:

1st Row	Silver Star with Oak Leaf Cluster	Legion of Merit	Bronze Star Medal	World War I Victory Medal
2nd Row	Army of Occupation of Germany Medal	American Defense Service Medal	American Campaign Medal	European-African-Middle Eastern Campaign Medal with three service stars
3rd Row	World War II Victory Medal	Army of Occupation Medal	Belgian Croix de guerre 1940–1945 with Palm	Order of the Patriotic War Second Class (Union of Soviet Socialist Republics)

== See also ==
- Lucius Roy Holbrook
