= Abraham Klauber =

American entrepreneur

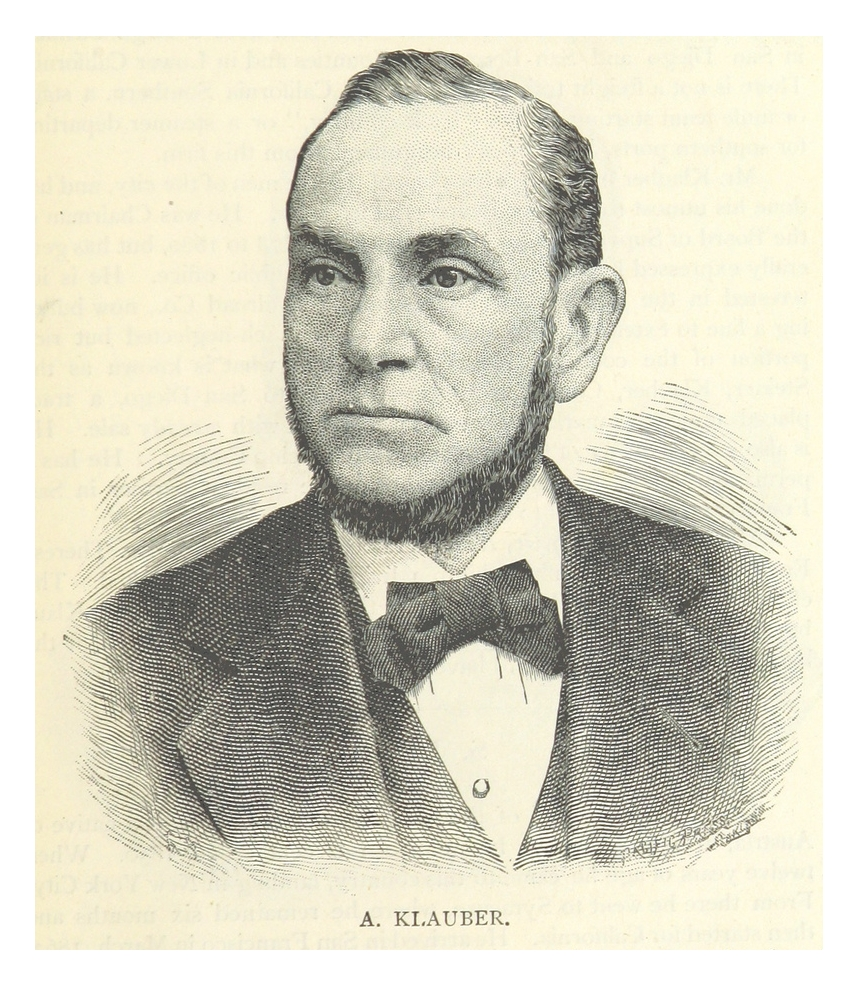
- Abraham Klauber, c. 1885

Chairman of the San Diego County Board of Supervisors
- In office 1878–1880

Personal details
- Born: January 24, 1831 Zdeslav, Bohemia
- Died: July 23, 1911 (aged 80) San Diego, California
- Spouse: Theresa Epstein
- Children: 12 (including Laurence Monroe Klauber and Alice Ellen Klauber)
- Parent(s): Jacob Klauber and Elizabeth Klauber
- Occupation: Entrepreneur
- Known for: Pioneer merchant in California and Nevada, co-founder of Klauber Wangenheim Co.

Abraham Klauber (January 24, 1831 in Zdeslav, Bohemia – July 23, 1911 in San Diego, California) was an American entrepreneur.

== Life ==
Klauber was the grandson of Rabbi Moses Klauber, and the son of Jacob and Elizabeth Klauber. Klauber's father died of cholera in 1844, leaving 13-year-old Klauber as the sole support for both his mother and younger sister Mary. He immediately went to work for a merchant named Mandlebaum, as a clerk in his grocery. As a young man he learned the merchandising business, but by the time he was nineteen, he had heard the tales of California's gold rush and of freedom in America. In 1850 he left his homeland to make his fortune in the New World.

In 1850 from Bremerhaven, Germany, Klauber took the sailing ship (Ocean Queen) to New Orleans. On arriving he then took a steamboat to St. Louis, where he went to work for Herman Levi. After a short time he moved on to Ottawa, Illinois, where he worked for Francis Mandlebaum, soon the two men became business partners. In 1852 the two left for New York, setting sail for the gold mines of California via the Isthmus of Nicaragua. The trip across the Nicaraguan Isthmus was plagued with much sickness and death. It was during the crossing that Klauber contracted yellow fever, which he survived. On arriving in San Francisco in July 1852, Klauber traveled again up river to Sacramento where he and his partner Francis Mandlebaum started a small clothing and general store. Klauber was witness to the great fire and flood of Sacramento on November 2, 1852. After rebuilding their store, Klauber moved to Volcano, California, setting up a branch store called "The Sacramento Store, Abraham Klauber & Co." Klauber and Mandlebaum married two sisters Louisa and Theresa Epstein who were also originally from Bohemia. Mandlebaum and Klauber were joined later in their business enterprises by brothers-in-law Morris Epstein and Henry Epstein. Henry Epstein would be elected as a state legislator representing Douglas County for the first Organization of the State of Nevada.

The store in Volcano did very well during the Gold Rush, and soon Klauber opened another group of stores over the Sierra in Genoa, Utah Territory. The Genoa store was to play a key role in the history of Nevada. During his years in Nevada (1859–1868) he opened branch stores in Dayton, Carson City and Virginia City, Nevada. Klauber provided his stores with goods by trucking supplies via mule train and wagon across the Sierra Mountains. Klauber's store in Genoa was used by Wells Fargo to conduct its business. The company's agents, Klauber and Henry Epstein, also became local agents for the Pony Express. The Pony Express was an important link with the outside world. It was a lifeline of information for the local papers that brought in the latest news and reports on the festering slave question in the eastern United States. The communications were even more important during this period since the country was leading up to the start of the Civil War.

Klauber became a U.S. Citizen on March 12, 1859. Using money he had earned from his business enterprises, he soon sent for both his mother and sister in Bohemia. After having three children, Klauber began to tire of the hard mountain life. The Comstock mines had begun to slow production, and the establishment of the transcontinental railroad began to negatively affect his Nevada Business. Klauber soon began to look for another place to live. In 1869, he chose San Diego as the place where he would move his enterprises. It was in San Diego where he created his new business in an area called "New Town," purchasing a lot from the "Father of San Diego" Alonzo Horton. For the next 40 years he would grow both his family and business enterprises starting with Steiner & Klauber, Klauber & Levi and then finally the very successful wholesale food distribution firm of Klauber Wangenheim Co. Klauber and his wife Theresa would raise 9 of their 12 children to adults. Klauber's youngest son Laurence Monroe Klauber (1883 in San Diego, California – 1968), was an American herpetologist, and was considered to be the foremost authority on rattlesnakes. In 1877, Klauber ran for and was elected with 756 votes to serve with D.R. Foss and E. Ormsby on San Diego's Board of Supervisors, serving as its chairman 1878–1880. The much revered 80-year-old pioneer and adventurer passed to his final rest on July 23, 1911. Acquaintances declared that his death marked the passing of one of the gentlest and most loved characters the southland had ever known.

There is still a Klauber Avenue to the southeast of City Heights, the neighborhood Klauber was instrumental in founding. In City Heights itself, Klauber Street was renamed to Wightman, but the old name can still be seen engraved in the sidewalk in some places, as it is a custom in San Diego to preserve the original markings when repaving the sidewalks. Klauber/Wightman St. is one block south of University Ave, which was originally named after Klauber's partner Steiner.
