= Ann Scott =

Ann Scott may refer to:

- Ann Scott (French novelist) (born 1965)
- Ann Scott (British author) (born 1950), British feminist author
- Ann Scott (singer), Irish singer-songwriter
- Ann London Scott (1929–1975), American feminist
- Ann Scott (First Lady of Florida)
- Ann Scott-Moncrieff (1914–1943), Scottish writer

== See also ==
- Anne Scott (disambiguation)
- Anna Scott (disambiguation)
- Scott (surname)
