= Thomas J. Wood =

American politician

Thomas John Wood
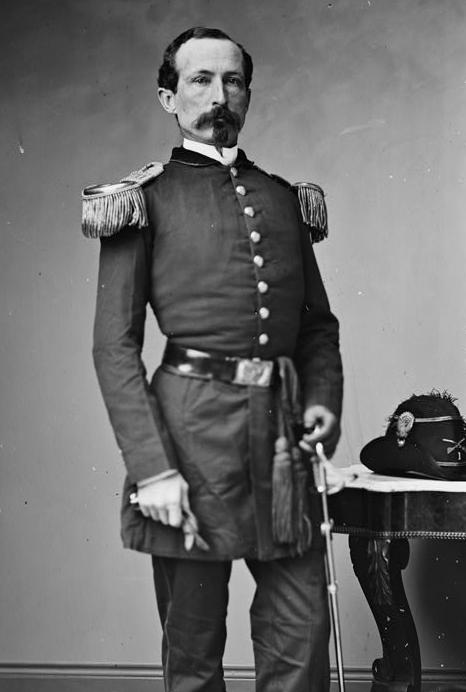
- Born: September 25, 1823; Munfordville, Kentucky, U.S.
- Died: February 26, 1906 (aged 82); Dayton, Ohio, U.S.
- Burial place: West Point Cemetery
- Children: George Henry Wood
- Military career
- Allegiance: United States of America; Union
- Branch: United States Army; Union Army
- Service years: 1845–1868
- Rank: Major General
- Commands: 2nd Cavalry Regiment; IV Corps
- Conflicts: Mexican–American War; American Civil War

Thomas John Wood (September 25, 1823 – February 26, 1906) was a career United States Army officer. He served in the Mexican–American War and as a Union general during the American Civil War.

During the Mexican–American War, Wood served on the staff of General Zachary Taylor and later joined the 2nd Dragoons.

During the Civil War, he participated in many battles in the Western Theater. Wood commanded a division at the Battle of Chickamauga in September 1863, during which time he chose to obey a questionable order from commanding general William S. Rosecrans to reposition his division. In doing so, Wood opened a gap in the Union lines, which contributed to the defeat of the Federal forces in the battle and their subsequent retreat.

Wood and his division took part in the successful Union assault in the Battle of Missionary Ridge in November during the Chattanooga campaign. He also commanded the IV Corps of the Army of the Cumberland during the Battle of Nashville in December 1864.

== Early life and career ==
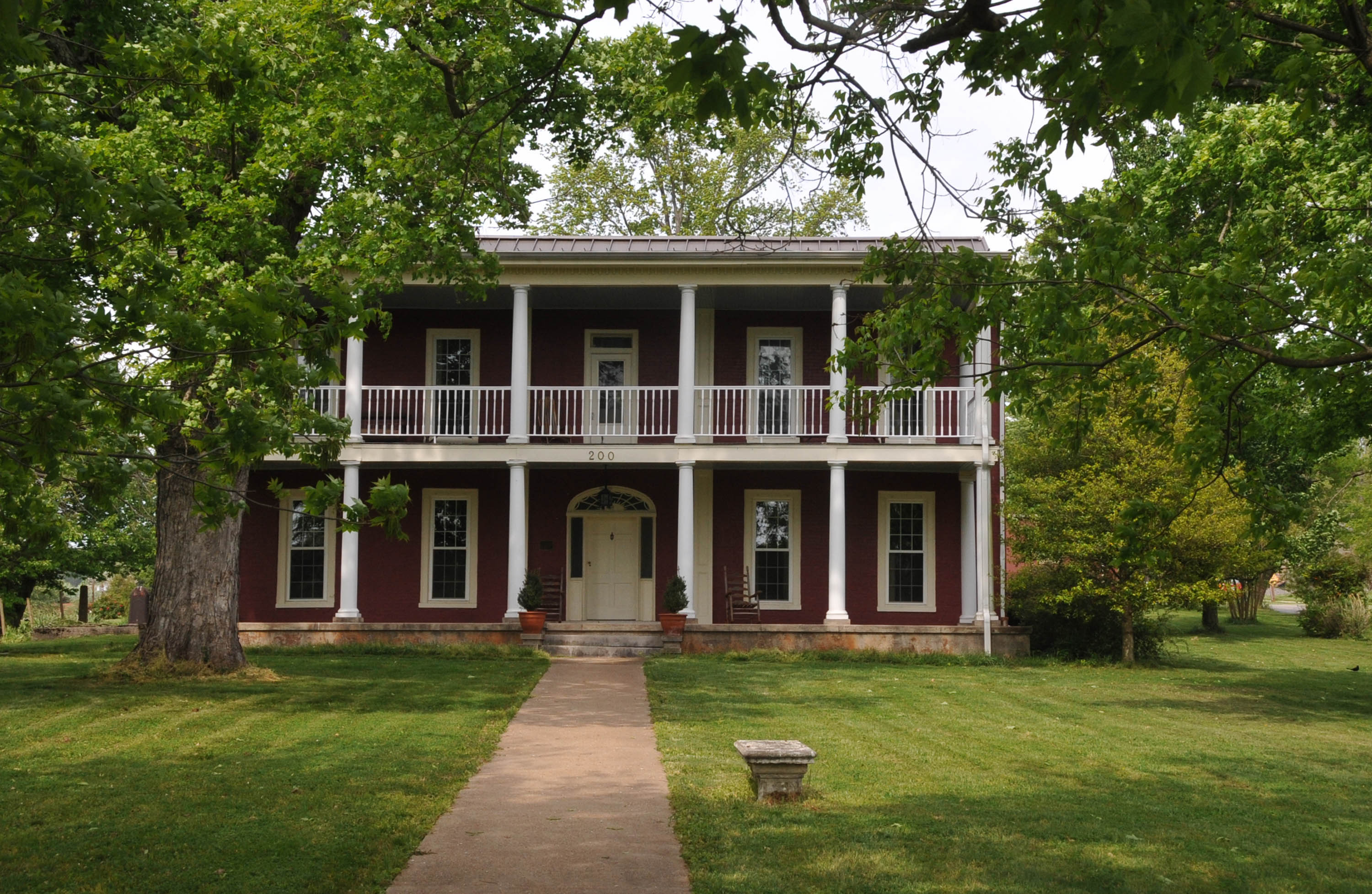
Wood home in Munfordville

Wood was born in rural Munfordville, Kentucky, the son of George Twyman Wood, an army officer, and Elizabeth Helm (through his mother, he was a cousin of Confederate general Benjamin H. Helm). He was an 1845 graduate of the United States Military Academy, finishing 5th in a class of 41 cadets. He was commissioned as a brevet second lieutenant Topographical Engineers in the United States Army Corps of Engineers on 1 July 1845.

In 1846, Wood joined General Zachary Taylor's staff for a few months as the Mexican–American War erupted, and saw his first action at the Battle of Palo Alto on 8 May 1846. He soon transferred at his request to U.S. 2nd Dragoons and received a brevet First Lieutenant for "gallant and meritorious conduct" at the Battle of Buena Vista in February 1847. After the war, he served in a succession of cavalry postings on the open frontier in the American Old West, including service in the Sioux Expedition of 1855 and the Kansas Disturbances of 1856–57. Wood traveled in Europe from 1859 until early 1861 on a leave of absence from the army.

== Civil War ==
During early days of the Civil War, Wood helped organize, train, and equip several volunteer regiments in Indiana. In October 1861, he was promoted to brigadier general of Indiana volunteers. The following month, he married Caroline E. Greer of Dayton, Ohio.

Wood commanded a brigade in the Tennessee and Mississippi campaigns at the beginning of the war. He commanded a division in the Army of the Ohio, then in the Army of the Cumberland. Wood was present at the second day of the Battle of Shiloh. Wood was wounded during the Battle of Murfreesboro in December 1862 but refused to leave the field until the fighting was over. Wood's division was credited with holding the apex of the Federal line on the Nashville Turnpike against heavy Confederate attacks.

He suffered controversy at the Battle of Chickamauga, where he was blamed for contributing to William S. Rosecrans's defeat. On September 20, 1863, a breakdown in situational awareness by Rosecrans and poor staff work resulted in Wood receiving a seemingly senseless order that, if literally obeyed, required him to pull his division out of the line to the support of another division further to his left, dangerously creating an unprotected gap in the right of the line. Instead of verifying his commander's actual intent, Wood elected to regard the order as imperative and moved his division out of its position.

Historian Peter Cozzens wrote:

While Wood read the order, [Col.] Starling began to explain its intent. Wood interrupted. Brannan was in position, he said, there was no vacancy between Reynold's division and his own. "Then there is no order," retorted Starling. There the matter should have ended. And with anyone but Tom Wood, it most assuredly would have. Rosecrans had upbraided Wood twice for failing to obey orders promptly. ... [including] the dressing down just 90 minutes earlier in front of Wood's entire staff. The barbs of Rosecrans's invective pained the Kentuckian. Anger clouded his reason. No, he told Starling, the order was imperative, he would move at once."

Less than 30 minutes after Wood moved his division, Confederate Lt. Gen. James Longstreet's men poured through the resulting gap and cut Rosecrans's army in two. Rosecrans was eventually relieved from command of the Army of the Cumberland following this Union defeat, while Wood retained his division.

Cozzens finds fault with Wood "for letting petty bitterness get the better of him" and Rosecrans for "not checking the order to make sure it reflected his intent. Rosey was tired and it showed."

Wood redeemed himself during the successful assault on Missionary Ridge in November and at the Battle of Lovejoy's Station on August 20, 1864, where despite a badly shattered leg, he stayed on the field encouraging his men. At Missionary Ridge, Wood's division was the first division to reach the rebel positions atop the heights and the first division to drive defenders from their fortifications.

He commanded the IV Corps of the Army of the Cumberland at the Battle of Nashville, and pursued John Bell Hood's Confederates after the Union victory.

President Abraham Lincoln appointed Wood to the grade of major general of volunteers on February 22, 1865, to rank from January 27, 1865. On February 14, 1865, the U.S. Senate had confirmed the President's January 30, 1865 nomination of Wood's appointment.

Wood was mustered out of the volunteers on September 1, 1866.

== Postbellum career and death ==
After the Confederates surrendered, Wood was assigned to duty in Mississippi with the occupation army. Frustrated with administrative duty with the Freedmen's Bureau and the politics of Reconstruction, he retired from the service in June 1868, having achieved the same rank in the regular army. His war wounds prevented him from achieving his desire of returning to active duty on the frontier.

Wood moved to Dayton and became active in the Grand Army of the Republic, a social organization for Union Army veterans. He also served as a member of the board of visitors at the U.S. Military Academy and was a companion of the Military Order of the Loyal Legion of the United States. In 1892 he became a Veteran Member of the Aztec Club of 1847.

When he died in 1906, Wood was the last survivor of his West Point class.

== See also ==
- List of American Civil War generals (Union)

Military offices
Preceded by David S. Stanley	Commander of the IV Corps; December 1, 1864 – January 31, 1865	Succeeded by David S. Stanley
