= IV Corps (Union army) =

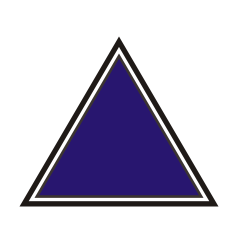
- IV Corps badge
- Active: March 13, 1862 – August 1, 1863; October 10, 1863 – August 1, 1865
- Country: United States of America
- Branch: Union Army
- Type: Army Corps
- Size: Corps
- Part of: Army of the Potomac
- Engagements: American Civil War

Insignia
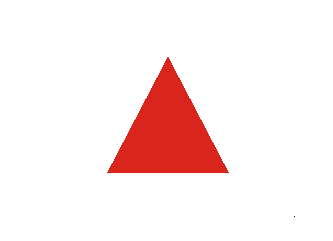
- 1st Division

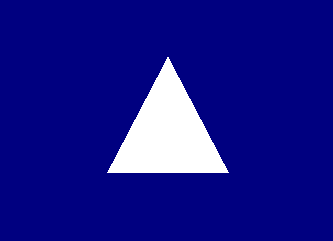
- 2nd Division

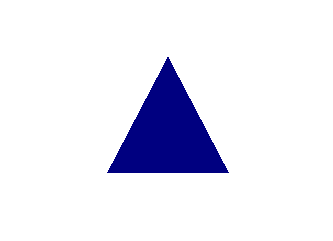
- 3rd Division

There were two corps of the Union Army called IV Corps during the American Civil War. They were separate units, one serving with the Army of the Potomac and the Department of Virginia in the Eastern Theater, 1862–1863, the other with the Army of the Cumberland in the Western Theater, 1863–1865.

== IV Corps (Eastern Theater) ==
The IV Corps, Army of the Potomac, was created on March 13, 1862, and placed under the command of Erasmus D. Keyes, who had commanded a brigade at First Bull Run. It consisted initially of three divisions, under Darius N. Couch, Silas Casey, and William F. "Baldy" Smith. Couch's division was transferred to join VI Corps during the Antietam Campaign and remained with them for the duration of the war. The corps' peak strength (in early 1862) was 37,000 men.

The corps took part in George B. McClellan's Peninsula Campaign of 1862, playing a major role in repulsing Confederate attacks at Seven Pines and Malvern Hill. After the campaign, IV Corps remained on the Peninsula, with Couch's division later detached. The corps was attached to the Department of Virginia under John A. Dix, and took part (along with VII Corps) in minor diversionary actions against Richmond during the Gettysburg campaign. The corps was officially discontinued on August 1, 1863. Elements of IV Corps were later absorbed into XVIII Corps.

=== Command history ===
Erasmus D. Keyes	March 13, 1862 – August 1862	Army of the Potomac
Erasmus D. Keyes	August 1862 – August 1, 1863	Department of Virginia

== IV Corps (Western Theater) ==
This corps was created on October 10, 1863, from the remnants of XX and XXI Corps, both of which had suffered heavy casualties at Chickamauga. It was initially commanded by Gordon Granger and its division commanders were Philip Sheridan, Charles Cruft, and Thomas J. Wood. It served with distinction in the famous unordered attack on Missionary Ridge at Chattanooga, and served in the Knoxville and Atlanta Campaigns. During John B. Hood's Franklin-Nashville Campaign, General William T. Sherman left the IV (and XXIII Corps), under the overall command of General George H. Thomas, to defend Tennessee, and the corps was heavily engaged in the battles at Spring Hill, Franklin, and Nashville. When the force Thomas commanded at Nashville was divided, he was left in command only of the IV Corps and cavalry under James H. Wilson and George Stoneman. The IV Corps was ordered to block the mountain passes and prevent a potential retreat by Lee's army into the mountains.

Records differ regarding the further history of the corps. Two sources (Note: Eicher and Phisterer.) report that it was deactivated on August 1, 1865. A third (Note: Fox. Stanley's personnel records indicate he commanded the Central District of Texas in June and July 1865, so a corps commander for the entire disputed period cannot be identified.) reports that after the war it was sent to Texas as part of the U.S. Army detachment dispatched to persuade French Emperor Napoleon III to withdraw his troops from Mexico, and was not disbanded until December 1865.

=== Command history ===
Gordon Granger	October 10, 1863 – April 10, 1864	Chattanooga and Knoxville
Oliver O. Howard	April 10, 1864 – July 27, 1864	To Atlanta
David S. Stanley	July 27, 1864 – December 1, 1864	Wounded at Franklin
Thomas J. Wood	December 1, 1864 – January 31, 1865	Nashville
David S. Stanley	January 31, 1865 – August 1, 1865	
