= David S. Stanley =

American Officer

David Sloane Stanley
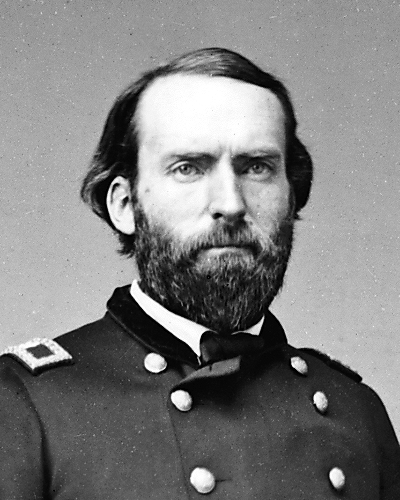
- Maj. Gen. David S. Stanley
- Born: June 1, 1828; Cedar Valley, Ohio, US
- Died: March 13, 1902 (aged 73); Washington, D.C., US
- Burial place: United States Soldiers' and Airmen's Home National Cemetery, Washington, D.C.
- Military career
- Allegiance: United States of America; Union
- Branch: United States Army; Union Army
- Service years: 1852–1892
- Rank: Brigadier General (U.S.A.); Major General (U.S.V.)
- Commands: IV Corps; 22nd U.S. Infantry
- Conflicts: American Civil War; Battle of Dug Springs; Battle of Wilson's Creek; Battle of Island Number Ten; Battle of Shiloh; Siege of Corinth; Battle of Iuka; Second Battle of Corinth; Battle of Stones River; Tullahoma Campaign; Battle of Chickamauga; Atlanta campaign; Sherman's March to the Sea; Second Battle of Franklin; Indian Wars
- Awards: - Medal of Honor

David Sloane Stanley (June 1, 1828 – March 13, 1902) was a Union Army general during the American Civil War. Stanley took part in the Second Battle of Corinth and the Battle of Stones River as a division commander. He was later made a corps commander under William Tecumseh Sherman and sent to Tennessee to oppose John Bell Hood's Army of Tennessee. At a critical moment in the Battle of Franklin (November 1864), he saved part of George D. Wagner’s division from destruction, earning America's highest military decoration, the Medal of Honor. Later he explored the Yellowstone River, and his favorable reports encouraged settlement of this region.

== Early life ==
Stanley was born in Cedar Valley, Wayne County, Ohio. He graduated from West Point in 1852 and went to the Western frontier to survey railroad routes. He engaged in Indian fighting and was promoted to captain in March 1861, shortly before the outbreak of the Civil War. Stanley was on duty at Fort Washita in Indian Territory when war broke out. He led his men to Fort Leavenworth, Kansas.

== Civil War ==
He fought at several battles in Missouri, including the Battle of Wilson's Creek, where he guarded the supply trains. President Abraham Lincoln appointed Stanley as brigadier general of U.S. Volunteers September 28, 1861, although the U.S. Senate did not confirm the appointment until March 7, 1862. Fighting in the Western Theater, he participated in the operations against New Madrid, Missouri and the Battle of Island Number Ten. He was involved in numerous major battles, including the Siege of Corinth, Battle of Iuka, and Second Battle of Corinth, where he commanded a division of infantry of the Army of the Mississippi, and the Battle of Stones River, in which he led the cavalry of the Army of the Cumberland. On March 11, 1863, Stanley was appointed major general of volunteers to rank from November 29, 1862. Stanley also led the Union cavalry in the Tullahoma Campaign. He fell ill late in 1863 and missed the Battle of Chickamauga. In 1864, he fought under William Tecumseh Sherman as a division commander in the IV Corps of the Army of the Cumberland during the Atlanta campaign, and he was promoted to command of the corps when Maj. Gen. Oliver O. Howard was named commander of the Army of the Tennessee. After the capture of the city, instead of employing him marching to the sea, Sherman dispatched Stanley and his IV Corps to Tennessee to help protect the state from invasion by John Bell Hood's Army of Tennessee.

For leading one of his brigades in a successful counterattack during a critical moment in the fighting at the Battle of Franklin on November 30, 1864, the President of the United States on behalf of the United States Congress presented him with the Medal of Honor on March 29, 1893. Two of his divisions having been reassigned to the defensive lines of the XXIII Corps before the battle, Stanley had no actual command. Two brigades of the remaining division, under Brig. Gen. George D. Wagner, were overwhelmed by the initial Confederate assault, having been left in an exposed position. It was for his role in the counterattack by the 3rd Brigade of Wagner's division that Stanley was awarded the medal. He was wounded in the neck at the same time and had his horse shot out from under him. Maj. Gen. Jacob Cox, commanding the defenses, provided Stanley a remount with which to seek medical attention, and Stanley did not participate further in the battle. He returned to corps command only after the Battle of Nashville.

== Postbellum career ==
After the war, Stanley was appointed colonel of the 22nd U.S. Infantry, primarily serving in the Dakota Territory until 1874. He commanded the Yellowstone Expedition of 1873, successfully conducting his troops through several unmapped areas, and his favorable reports on the country led to subsequent settlement of the region. In 1879, Stanley and his regiment were reassigned to Texas to suppress Indian raids in the western portion of the state. He was ordered to Santa Fe, New Mexico, in 1882, and placed in command of the District of New Mexico. In March 1884, he was appointed a brigadier general in the regular army, and assigned command of the Department of Texas. He retired in 1892.

Stanley was interred at the United States Soldiers' and Airmen's Home National Cemetery in Washington, D.C.

He was a First Class Companion of the Military Order of the Loyal Legion of the United States and a Hereditary Companion of the Military Order of Foreign Wars. In 1894 he became a member of the District of Columbia Society of the Sons of the American Revolution. He died in Washington DC in 1902

His son-in-law, Willard Ames Holbrook (married to his daughter, Anna Huntington Stanley, American Impressionist artist), also served as a major general in the U.S. Army. His only son, David Sheridan Stanley, and five of his grandsons (including Willard Ames Holbrook, Jr.) would later graduate from West Point. Additionally, his son, David Sheridan Stanley was the principal founder of the Army Navy Country Club, located in Arlington, VA.

== Medal of Honor citation ==

Rank and Organization:

Major General, U.S. Volunteers. Place and Date: At Franklin, Tenn., November 30, 1864. Entered Service At: Congress, Wayne County, Ohio. Born: June 1, 1828, Cedar Valley, Ohio. Date of Issue: March 29, 1893.

Citation:

At a critical moment rode to the front of one of his brigades, reestablished its lines, and gallantly led it in a successful assault.

== See also ==
- List of Medal of Honor recipients
- List of American Civil War Medal of Honor recipients: Q–S
- List of American Civil War generals (Union)

== Notes ==
Military offices
Preceded by Oliver O. Howard	Commander of the IV Corps; July 27, 1864 – December 4, 1864	Succeeded by Thomas J. Wood
Preceded by Thomas J. Wood	Commander of the IV Corps; January 31, 1865 – August 1, 1865	Succeeded by None, End of War
