= Alice Ellen Klauber =

American painter, curator and interior designer

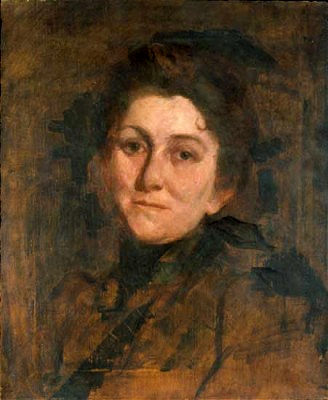
Alice Ellen Klauber, by Robert Henri (c.1914)

Alice Ellen Klauber (May 19, 1871, San Diego - July 5, 1951, Lemon Grove) was an American painter, curator, and interior designer. Her style took inspiration from her contemporary impressionist and modern artists, and she took a great interest in Asian art. She was an active member of the San Diego's artist community, and was involved in several organizations including the Fine Arts Society of San Diego, the Wednesday Club, and the San Diego Artists Guild.

== Biography ==
=== Early life ===
Alice Ellen Klauber was born on May 19, 1871 in San Diego, California. She was either the third or fifth child of Abraham Klauber (1831–1911) an immigrant to the United States and prominent San Diego merchant, and Theresa Klauber (née Epstein; 1841–1921). In 1885, when Alice was 14 years old, the Klauber family moved to San Francisco, where her grandparents lived, hoping to find better educational opportunities. The family moved back to San Diego in 1892, where they would remain.

=== Art Education and International Travel ===
While in San Francisco, Alice Klauber began her artistic training at the Art Students’ League. She went on to study under American Impressionist painters William Merritt Chase, and Robert Henri; and later studied with German avant-garde painter Hans Hoffmann, and with Mexican muralist Alfredo Ramos Martinez. Klauber's style shifted over the years, reflecting her training, but she remained enthusiastic about modern art.

Klauber traveled around the world developing her style, and curating unique pieces. In 1907 she traveled to Italy with Chase, then returned to Europe in 1912 where she studied in Spain with Robert Henri. It's noted that Klauber's style became more loose after studying with Henri. She would return to Europe twice more: in 1922 and again in 1934-1935. In 1929 Klauber also traveled to various countries in Asia including China, Japan, and Cambodia, where she would further develop her interest in "Oriental" art. In the summer of 1930, Klauber attended a summer session at UC Berkeley taught by Hoffmann during one of his brief visits to the US. She would later study with Martinez while he was in Southern California in the 1940s.

=== Career ===
==== The Panama-California Exposition ====
Alice Klauber and many other prominent San Diego women, were deeply involved in the planning and execution of the Panama-California Exposition of 1915. After meeting with the San Diego County Board of Supervisors in early 1914, the women organized the San Diego Woman's Association, with Klauber and fellow Wednesday Club member Evelyn Lawson acting as the association's leaders. Their goal was to create a space at the Exposition where women were represented, and could rest comfortably. In June of 1914, the Board of Supervisors provided Klauber and the association with $5,000 and space in the second story of the California Building, a far cry from the $75,000 budget they had originally sought.

As a member of the Woman's Board for the Exposition, Klauber was deeply involved in its success. She was made chair of the Fine Arts Committee, and also headed the furnishings committee, making her responsible for the interior design of the Headquarters for Women and Hostess Gallery. As chair of the Fine Arts Committee, Klauber worked with her friend Robert Henri (who she had invited to San Diego in 1914), and Edgar Hewett (the Exposition's Director of Exhibits) to a create modern art exhibit in the Fine Arts Building that displayed paintings by some of America's most notable contemporary artists. In 1916, Klauber and Henri's exhibit went on tour in the western states.

Klauber's own work would also be displayed at the Exposition in November of 1915 through the end of the Exposition in 1916. Later, her work would be displayed again at the 1935 California Pacific International Exposition, also in Balboa Park.

==== The San Diego Museum of Art ====
During a Wednesday Club meeting on April 14th, 1909, Alice Klauber proposed the construction of an art gallery in San Diego. Her proposal was likely triggered by the February 5, 1909 art heist, where paintings on display the San Diego library were stolen out of their frames. Klauber believed it was important to have a safe, secure space for artists to continue displaying art in San Diego without the fear of it being stolen. The club made Klauber chairman of the Art Building Committee, and she swiftly began fundraising efforts.

In 1926 the Fine Arts Society of San Diego, of which Klauber was a member, officially opened the San Diego Museum of Art. After the opening, Klauber gave lectures sponsored by the Wednesday Club to encourage donors to the museum and secure more art to display. In 1935, Klauber and a group of friends involved in the museum began meeting to increase interest in and appreciation of Asian art. Five years later, Klauber was selected to be the honorary curator of the museum's oriental art collection, and in 1948 the museum's Asiatic Arts Committee was officially formed. As a collector, Klauber donated many works to the museum, including block prints by Hokusai and Hiroshige.

==== Interior Design and Other Work ====
Klauber was a well respected interior designer. As head of the furnishings committee for the San Diego California Exposition she designed several spaces including the Persimmon Room and Balboa Park's community room. She also created interior designs for the YMCA and the Wednesday Club, as well as the Wednesday Club's logo. She was also known to have designed bookplates for many friends and relatives, including the Marston and Wangenheim families. Klauber was also known to write poetry, and in 1928, the Denrich Press of Chula Vista published a book of her poetry.

== Affiliated Organizations ==
Alice Klauber was a member of several organizations, including the San Diego Art Association and the San Diego Art Guild. In 1926, she and her brother-in-law, banker Julius Wangenheim (1866–1942), participated in the creation of the Fine Arts Society of San Diego. She also provided financial support to the Fine Arts Society by donating artworks from such famous painters as Henri Matisse and Pablo Picasso.

- San Diego Art Association
- San Diego Artists Guild
- Fine Arts Society of San Diego
- La Jolla Art Association
- Los Angeles Watercolor Club
- San Diego Woman's Association
- Panama-California Exposition Woman's Board
  - Chair of the Art Committee
  - Head of the Furnishing Committee
- The Wednesday Club
  - Chairman of the Art Building Committee

== Works ==
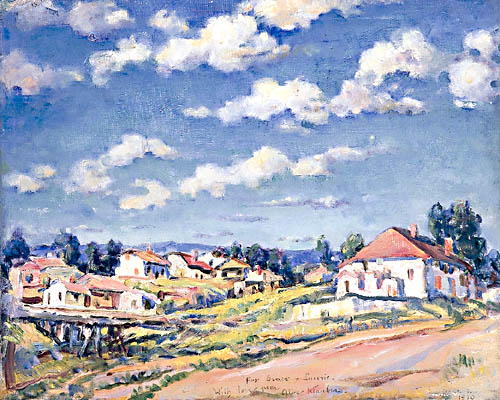
"Landscape with Houses and Bridge," 1910, oil on canvas.

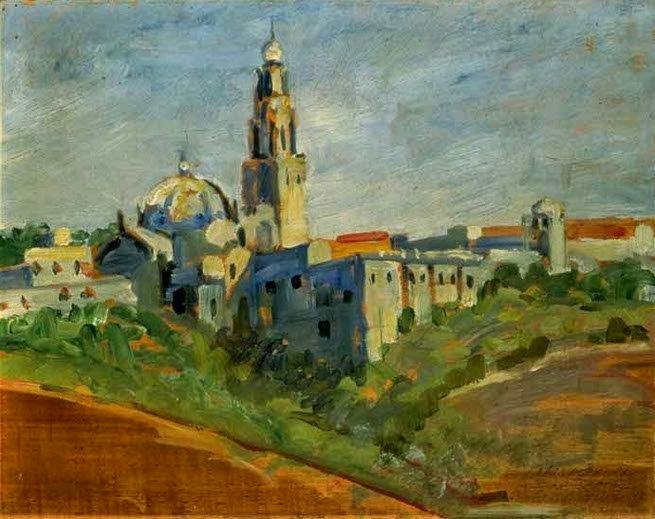
"California Tower," 1915, oil on canvas.

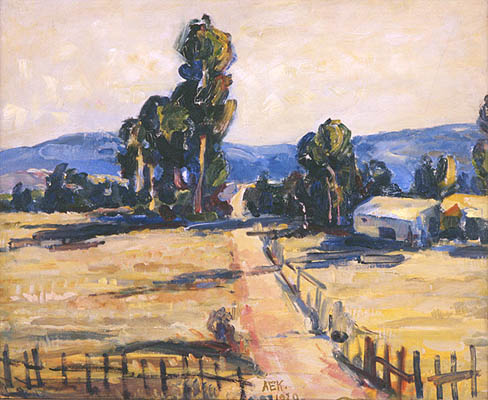
"Summer Afternoon," 1920, oil on canvas.

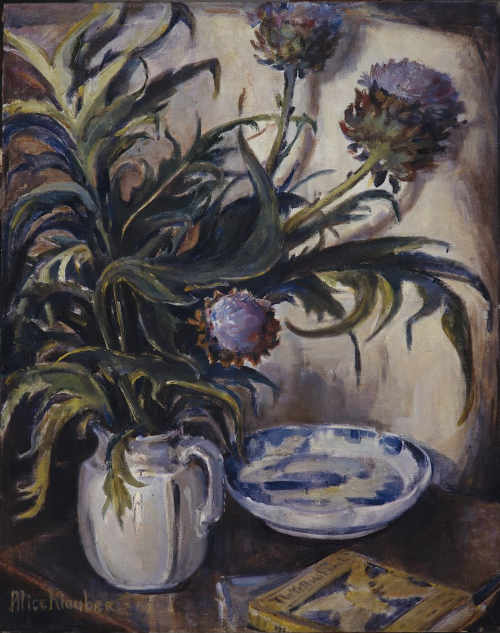
"Artichokes," c. 1933, oil on canvas.

== Bibliography ==
- Alice E. Klauber Papers, MS 182, San Diego History Center Document Collection, San Diego, CA. https://sandiegohistory.org/archives/archivalcollections/ms182/
- "Alice Ellen Klauber." FamilySearch.org, November 23, 2025. https://ancestors.familysearch.org/en/LRYJ-FTF/alice-ellen-klauber-1871-1951
- Barker, May Guthrie. "'Miss Klauber Proposes...' The Wednesday Club and the San Diego Museum of Art." Presented at the Wednesday Club April 9, 1986. in Wednesday Club Collection, MS 80, San Diego History Center Document Archives, San Diego, CA. https://sandiegohistory.org/archives/archivalcollections/ms80/
- Crawford, Richard. "Thief Checked Out Valuable Paintings from City Library." The San Diego Union-Tribune (February 3, 2011). https://www.sandiegoyesterday.com/wp-content/uploads/2011/02/Carnegie-Library-Art-Heist.pdf
- Kamerling, Bruce. "Painting Ladies: Some Early San Diego Women Artists." The Journal of San Diego History 32, no. 3 (1986): 167-170. https://sandiegohistory.org/journal/1986/july/klauber/
- "Klauber, Alice Ellen (1871-1951)." The Journal of San Diego History 47, no. 3 (2001). https://sandiegohistory.org/journal/2001/july/imagesklauber/
- McClain, Molly. "A Room of Their Own: The Contribution of Women to the Panama-California Exposition, 1915." The Journal of San Diego History 61, no. 1 (2015): 253-278. https://sandiegohistory.org/sites/default/files/journal/v61-1/v61-1mcclain.pdf
- McClain, Molly. "Landscape, Seascape, Dreamscape Masterworks: Art of the Exposition Era." The Journal of San Diego History 61, no. 2 (2015): 411-418. https://www.sandiegohistory.org/sites/default/files/journal/v61-2/v61-2exhibits.pdf
- Petersen, Martin E. "An Overview of San Diego Artists." The Journal of San Diego History 47, no. 3 (2001). https://sandiegohistory.org/journal/2001/july/overview/
- Winn, Steven. "Strokes of Genius: Hans Hofmann's Gift to Berkeley." Cal Alumni Association. Retrieved November 21, 2025. https://alumni.berkeley.edu/california-magazine/spring-2019/strokes-genius-hans-hofmanns-gift-berkeley/
