= Anne Scott =

Anne Scott may refer to:

- Anne Scott (journalist), Scottish broadcast journalist
- Anne Scott, 1st Duchess of Buccleuch (1651–1732), Scottish peeress
- Anne Scott-James (1913–2009), British journalist and author
- Anne Scott-Pendlebury, Australian actress
- Anne Firor Scott (1921–2019), American historian

== See also ==
- Ann Scott (disambiguation)
