= Anna Page Scott =

American artist

- Born: October 13, 1863; Dubuque, Iowa
- Died: October 13, 1925 (aged 65); Dubuque, Iowa
- Known for: Painting, Educator
- Movement: American Impressionism

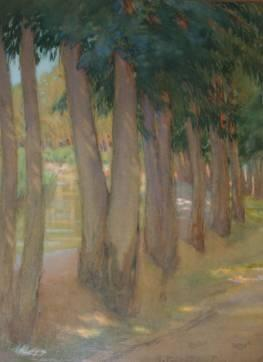
Eucalyptus Walk

Anna Page Scott (1863–1925) was an American Impressionist painter and educator.

== Biography ==
Scott was born in Dubuque, Iowa, on October 13, 1863. She studied at the School of the Art Institute of Chicago, the Pennsylvania Academy of the Fine Arts, and the Académie Colarossi. Around 1890 Scott settled in New York City where she worked as an illustrator for the Century Publishing Company. In 1897 she moved to Rochester, New York where she began her teaching career at the Mechanics Institute. She taught there until 1913.

Scott died on October 13, 1925, in Dubuque.

== Legacy ==
Scott was included in the 2016 traveling exhibition Rebels With a Cause: American Impressionist Women.
