= Anne Bragance =

French writer

Anne Bragance (Casablanca, 1945) is a French writer.

She was born in Morocco. She moved to Paris when she was sixteen years old and published her first novel when she was 28: «Tous les désespoirs vous sont permis ›› .

== Selected works ==
- 1973 : Tous les désespoirs vous sont permis, Flammarion
- 1975 : La Dent de rupture, Flammarion
- 1977 : Les Soleils rajeunis, Seuil
- 1978 : Changement de cavalière, Seuil
- 1979 : Clichy sur pacifique, Seuil
- 1983 : Une valse noire, Seuil
- 1983 : Le Damier de la reine, Mercure de France
- 1983 : L'Été provisoire, Mercure de France
- 1984 : Virginia Woolf ou la Dame sur le piédestal, Editions des femmes
- 1985 : Charade, Mercure de France
- 1986 : Bleu indigo, Grasset
- 1989 : La Chambre andalouse, Grasset
- 1991 : Annibal, Laffont
- 1992 : Le Voyageur de noces, Laffont
- 1993 : Une journée au point d'ombre, Laffont
- 1994 : Le Chagrin des Resslingen, Julliard
- 1995 : Mata Hari, Belfond
- 1996 : Les Cévennes, Equinoxe
- 1996 : Rose de pierre, Julliard
- 1998 : La Correspondante anglaise, Stock
- 1999 : Le Fils-récompense, Stock
- 2001 : Le Lit, Actes Sud
- 2003 : Casus Belli, Actes Sud
- 2004 : La Reine nue, Actes Sud
- 2005 : Une enfance marocaine, Actes Sud
- 2005 : L'Heure magique de la fiancée du pickpocket, Mercure de France
- 2005 : Danseuse en rouge, Actes Sud
- 2007 : Un goût de soleil, Nil.
- 2008 : Passe un ange noir, Mercure de France.
- 2009 : Une succulente au fond de l’impasse, Mercure de France.
- 2011 : Une affection de longue durée, Mercure de France.
- 2012 : Solitudes, Presses de la Cité.
- 2014 : Mata Hari, Belfond
- 2015 : Remise de peines, Mercure de France.
