= Ann Mortimer =

Canadian ceramic artist and member of the Order of Canada

- Born: 1934 (age 91–92); Toronto, Canada
- Website: http://www.annmortimerceramics.com

Ann Mortimer CM RCA (born in Toronto, Canada) is a Canadian ceramic artist. In 2000 Mortimer was appointed a member of the Order of Canada.
