= Ann S. Strand =

Wyoming politician

Member of the Wyoming House of Representatives from the Sweetwater district
- In office 1978–1985

Ann S. Strand is an American Democratic politician from Rock Springs, Wyoming. She represented the Sweetwater district in the Wyoming House of Representatives from 1978 to 1985.
