= Anne Mawathe =

Kenyan journalist

- Born: Anne Mawathe
- Known for: Journalism

Anne Mawathe is a Kenyan journalist. In 2014, she was shortlisted among the 28 finalists for the CNN Multichoice African Journalists Award.
