= Anna (name) =

Female given name

- Pronunciation: /ˈænə/, /ˈɑːnə/ (Note: While generally pronounced /ˈænə/ AN-ə, the pronunciation /ˈɑːnə/ AH-nə is more favorable in some instances like American actor Anna Faris and Anna from the 2013 film Frozen.)
- Gender: Female
- Name day: July 26

Origin
- Languages: Hebrew, Greek, Latin
- Meaning: favour, grace
- Region of origin: German (mainly Saarland), French (from Alsace and Lorraine of German origin), Slovak, and Hungarian

Other names
- Alternative spelling: Ana, Anne
- Variant forms: Ana, Anne, Annie
- Related names: Anita (Spanish); Anja (Danish); Aneta (Czech); Annetta (Italian); Annette (French); Annie (English); Annika (Swedish); Nancy; Nanette; Nannerl (Austro-Bavarian); Nannie; Ninon (French)
- See also: Hanna
- Popularity: see popular names

Anna is a feminine given name, the Latin form of the Hebrew name Hannah (Hebrew: חַנָּה, romanized: Ḥannāh), meaning "favour" or "grace". It is the name of Samuel's mother in the Hebrew Bible, rendered Ἄννα in Greek, Hannah in English, and Anna in Latin. The Greek form also appears in the New Testament story of Anna the Prophetess.

Anna is in wide use in countries across the world as are its variants Ana, Ann (originally the English spelling), and Anne which was originally a French version of the name though has been used in English speaking countries for hundreds of years. The name has also been used for numerous saints and queens. The name is also found in Virgil's Aeneid, where Anna appears as the sister of Dido advising her to keep Aeneas in her city.

== Variant forms ==
Alternative forms of Anna, including spelling variants, short forms, diminutives, and transliterations, are:

- Aenn – English
- Aen – English
- Aina – Catalan, Latvian, Lithuanian, Hungarian
- An – Dutch, Vietnamese
- Ana – Bulgarian, Croatian, English, Galician, Georgian, Hawaiian, Lithuanian, Macedonian, Portuguese, Romanian, Serbian, Slovene, Slovak, Spanish, Albanian, Bosnian
- حنا – Arabic
- ანა – Georgian
- Anaïs – Catalan, French, Provençal
- Anano – Georgian
- Anča – Czech, Romanian, Turkish
- Ance – Latvian
- Anci – Hungarian
- Ancsa – Hungarian
- Anša – Bosnian, Swahili
- Ansja – Swedish, Dutch
- Ane – Basque, Danish, Hawaiian
- Anechka – Russian
- Anelie – German
- Anella – Estonian
- Anelle – Estonian
- Anete – Estonian, Latvian
- Anett – Estonian, Hungarian
- Anette – Danish, Estonian, English, Finnish, Norwegian, Swedish
- Ania – Polish, Russian, Ukrainian,
- Anica – Croatian, Romanian, Serbian, Slovene, Spanish
- Anice – Scots
- Anicuta – Portuguese, Romanian
- Anika – Danish, Dutch, German
- Annika – Swedish, Finnish
- Anikó – Hungarian
- Anilla – Hungarian
- Anina – German
- Ann – Danish, Dutch, English, French, German
- Anna, Anissa, Ana, Anne – Indonesian
- Anissa – English
- Anisa – Albanian, Indonesian
- Anita – Estonian, Finnish, Indonesian, Latvian, Portuguese, Spanish, Swedish, English, Polish, Hungarian
- Anitte – German
- Annychka – Ukrainian
- Anja – Danish, Finnish, German, Norwegian, Serbian, Slovene, Swedish
- Anka – Bulgarian, Czech, German, Croatian, Polish, Russian, Serbian
- Anke – Frisian, German, Dutch
- Anne – Danish, English, Estonian, French, Swedish, Dutch
- Anna – Afrikaans, Armenian, Breton, Bulgarian, Catalan, Chinese, Czech, Danish, Dutch, English, Estonian, Finnish, French, German, Greek, Hungarian, Icelandic, Irish, Italian, Japanese, Korean, Latvian, Malayalam, Norwegian, Polish, Portuguese, Russian (Анна), Slovak, Swedish, Spanish, Vietnamese
- 安娜 (An-na) – Mandarin Chinese
- アンナ (An-na) – Japanese
- 杏奈 (An-na) – Japanese
- 안나 (An-na) – Korean
- Annaki – Greek
- Annamma – Malayalam
- Annamol – Malayalam
- Annchen – German
- Annechien – Dutch
- Anneka – English
- Anneke – Dutch
- Anneli – Estonian, Finnish, Swedish
- Annelie – Danish, German, Norwegian, Swedish
- Annella – Scots
- Annele – Latvian
- Annelle – French
- Annet – Dutch
- Annetta – Italian
- Annette – Danish, Dutch, French, Swedish
- Anni – Estonian, Finnish, German, Indonesian, Swedish
- Annick – Breton
- Annie – Danish, Dutch, English, French, Indonesian, Norwegian, Swedish
- Anniina – Finnish
- Annija – Latvian
- Annika – Dutch, Estonian, Finnish, Latvian, Swedish
- Annike – Estonian
- Anniken – Norwegian
- Anniki – Estonian
- Annikki – Finnish
- Anniņa – Latvian
- Annio – Greek
- Annora – English
- Annouche – French
- Annoula – Greek
- Annu – Finnish
- Annus – Hungarian
- Annukka – Finnish
- Annushka – Russian
- Annuska – Hungarian
- Anona – English
- Anouk – Dutch, French
- Ans – Dutch
- Antje – Dutch, German
- Anu – Estonian, Finnish
- Anushka – Russian
- Anya – Russian, Dutch
- Anyuta, Anyutka – Russian
- Asya – Russian
- Asenka – Russian
- Chana – Hebrew
- Chanah – Hebrew
- Channah – Hebrew
- Hajnal – Hungarian
- Hana ܚܐܢܐ – Syriac
- Hana – Czech, Indonesian, Lithuanian, Slovak, Turkish, Romanian
- Hania – Indonesian, Ukrainian, Polish
- Hanna – Belarusian, Danish, Dutch, English, Estonian, Finnish, Ge'ez, German, Icelandic, Indonesian, Norwegian, Polish, Swedish, Ukrainian, Hungarian
- Hannah – Hebrew, Arabic, English, Estonian, Swedish
- Hanne – German, Scandinavian, Dutch
- Hannela – Estonian
- Hannele – Estonian, Finnish
- Hannelore – German, Dutch
- Hannusia – Ukrainian
- Hena – Yiddish
- Henda – Yiddish
- Hendel – Yiddish
- Hene – Yiddish
- Henye – Yiddish
- Nyura – Russian
- Nyusha – Russian
- Ona – Hebrew, Lithuanian, Finnish
- Onnee – Manx
- Panka – Hungarian
- Panna – Hungarian
- Panni – Hungarian
- Աննա – Armenian
- แอนนา - Thai language

== Composite names including Anna and variants ==
- Adriana - Spanish, Portuguese
- Adrianna - English, German, Italian
- Adrianne - English, French
- Ana Barbara – Spanish, Portuguese
- Anabel – English, Galician, Indonesian, Polish, Spanish, Hungarian
- Anabela – Indonesian, Portuguese
- Anabella – Spanish, English, Indonesian, Hungarian
- Anabelle – English, Indonesian
- Ana Laura – Spanish, Portuguese
- Analeigh – English
- Ana Lidia – Spanish, Portuguese
- Ana Luisa – Spanish, Portuguese
- Ana Maria – Portuguese
- Ana María – Spanish, Bulgaria Language Bulgarian
- Anapatricia – Spanish
- Anamaria – English
- Anamaría – Spanish
- Ana-Maria – Romanian, Bulgarian
- Ann – Dutch, English
- Anna Barbara – English, German, Italian
- Annabel – Catalan, Dutch, English, Estonian, Indonesian
- Anna-Bella – English, Swedish
- Annabell – Hungarian
- Annabella – English, German, Indonesian, Italian, Swedish, Hungarian
- Annabelle – English, French, Indonesian
- Annabeth – English
- Annabetty - English
- Anna-Carin – Swedish
- Anna Greta – English, German, Swedish
- Anna-Greta – Swedish
- Anna Julia – English, German, Swedish
- Anna-Julia – Swedish
- Anna Laura – English, German, Swedish
- Anna-Laura – Swedish
- Annalena – German
- Anna-Lena – German
- Annalee – English
- Annaleigh – English
- Annaline – English
- Annalyn – English
- Annalynne – English
- Annalyssa – English
- Anna Lisa – English, German, Swedish
- Anna-Lisa – Swedish
- Anna Lidia – English, German, Swedish
- Anna-Lidia – Swedish
- Anna Louisa – English, German, Swedish
- Anna-Louisa – Swedish
- Anna Maria – English, German, Swedish, Catalan, Bulgarian
- Anna-Maria – Estonian, Finnish, Polish, Swedish, Bulgarian
- Annamaria – Italian, Bulgarian
- Annamária – Hungarian
- Ann-Britt – Swedish
- Ann-Charlotte – Swedish
- Ann-Christin – Swedish
- Annegret – German
- Anneke – Dutch
- Annelien – Dutch
- Annelies – Dutch, German
- Anneliese – Dutch, German
- Annelise – Danish
- Anneloes – Dutch
- Annemarie – Dutch, English, German
- Annemiek – Dutch
- Annemieke – Dutch
- Annesophie – German
- Ann-Kristin – Swedish
- Ann-Louise – Swedish
- Ann-Margret – Swedish
- Ann-Mari – Swedish
- Ann-Marie – Swedish
- Annmarie – English
- Ann-Sofi – Swedish
- Ann-Sofie – Swedish
- Bettyanna - English, German, Italian
- Bettyanne - English, French
- Ittianna – Malayalam
- Jillianna – English, German, Italian
- Jillianne – English, French
- Julianna – English, German
- Julianne – English, French
- Lauranna – English, German
- Lauranne – English, French
- Leann – English
- Leanna – English
- Leanne – English
- Leeann – English
- Lianna – English
- Liliana – Indonesian, Portuguese
- Lisann – Estonian
- Lisanna – Estonian
- Lisanne – Dutch, English, Estonian
- Luana – English
- Luann – English
- Luanna – English
- Luanne – English
- Lyanna – English, French, Greek, Latin
- Lyanne – English, French, Greek, Latin
- Marian – English, Estonian, Slovak
- Mariana – Czech, Estonian, Portuguese, Romanian, Spanish
- Mariann – Estonian, Hungarian
- Marianna – Hungarian
- Mari-Ann – Estonian
- Mari-Anna – Estonian
- Marianna – English, Estonian, Finnish, German, Greek, Hungarian, Italian, Polish, Russian
- Mari-Anne – Estonian
- Marianne – English, Danish, Estonian, French, German, Norwegian, Swedish
- Marijana – Croatian, Serbian, Slovene
- Marjaana – Estonian, Finnish
- Marjaane – Estonian
- Marjan – Dutch
- Marjana – Croatian, Danish
- Maryann – English
- Maryanne – English
- Hanna-Liina – Estonian
- Pollyanna – English
- Rosanna – English, Italian, Portuguese
- Roseanne – English
- Ruthanne – English
- Saranna – English

== People ==
Anna is a very common given name. People with the name include:

=== Academics, medicine, and science ===
- Anna Abulafia (born 1952), British scholar of religious history
- Anna Agnarsdóttir (born 1947), Icelandic academic
- Anna Aizer, labor and health economist
- Anna Akhmanova (born 1967), Russian cell biologist
- Anna Amtmann, German scientist
- Anna A. Angell (1844–1906), American medical doctor
- Anna Apostolaki (1880–1958), Greek archaeologist and museum curator
- Anna Atkins (1799–1871), British botanist and photographer
- Anna Jean Ayres (1920–1988), American occupational therapist and educational psychologist
- Anna Baetjer (1899–1984), American physiologist
- Anna Bågenholm, Swedish radiologist
- Anna Baillie (1864–1958), British nurse
- Anna P. Baker (1928–1985), Canadian visual artist
- Anna Balazs (born 1953), American materials scientist
- Anna Balletbó i Puig (born 1943), Spanish academic and politician
- Anna Banerji, Canadian academic and doctor
- Anna Simms Banks (1862–1923), American educator and political figure
- Anna Baranowsky, Canadian clinical psychologist
- Anna Barnacka, Polish astrophysicist and entrepreneur
- Anna Batchelor, British consultant medical doctor
- Anna Bateson (1863–1928), English botanist and suffragist
- Anna Bayerová (1853–1924), Czech medical doctor
- Anna Belfer-Cohen (born 1949), Israeli archaeologist
- Anna McClean Bidder (1903–2001), English zoologist and academic
- Anna Blount (1872–1953), American medical doctor
- Anna Bogomolnaia, Russian economist
- Anna Brackett (1836–1911), American philosopher
- Anna Brickhouse, American historian, author, and professor
- Anna Cox Brinton (1887–1969), American classics scholar, college administrator, writer, and Quaker leader
- Anna Broms, Finnish educator and pioneer in nursing
- Anna Broomall (1847–1931), American medical doctor and educator
- Anna L. Brown (died 1924), Canadian-born American medical doctor
- Anna Brożek (born 1980), Polish philosopher
- Anna Cartan (1878–1923), French mathematician
- Anna Ceresole (born 1961), Italian theoretical physicist
- Anna Chao Pai, American geneticist
- Anna C. Chave, American art historian
- Anna Quincy Churchill (1884–1971), American medical doctor
- Anna M. Cienciala (1929–2014), Polish-American historian and author
- Anna Clarén (born 1972), Swedish photographer and educator
- Anna Clark (British historian), British historian
- Anna Coble (died 2009), American biophysicist
- Anna Cohn (1950–2019), American museum director and Judaic scholar
- Anna Russell Cole (1846–1926), American philanthropist
- Anna Bailey Coles (died 2015), American medical doctor
- Anna Manning Comfort (1845–1931), American medical doctor
- Anna Consortini (died 1996), Italian physicist
- Anna E. Cooper (1897–1988), Liberian educator
- Anna J. Cooper (1858–1964), African-American author, educator, speaker and scholar
- Anna Costanza Baldry (1970–2019), Italian social psychologist
- Anna Coutsoudis (born 1952), South African public health scientist
- Anna Cox, British neuroscientist
- Anna Crone (1946–2009), American linguist and literary theorist
- Anna Baright Curry (1854–1924), American educator, founder of Curry College in Milton, Massachusetts
- Anna Dąbrowska-Banaszek (born 1961), Polish doctor and politician
- Anna Davin, British academic and community historian
- Anna Lou Dehavenon (1926–2012), US American anthropologist
- Anna Devor, biomedical engineer and academic
- Anna Donald (1966–2009), Australian medical doctor and researcher, academic and lecturer
- Anna Dybo (born 1959), Russian linguist
- Anna Cheney Edwards (1835–1930), American educator
- Anna Epps (1930–2017), American microbiologist
- Anna Erschler (born 1977), Russian mathematician
- Anna Essinger (1879–1960), German-Jewish educator
- Anna Etheridge (1839–1913), American Civil War nurse
- Anna-Bella Failloux, French Polynesian entomologist
- Anna Fárová (1928–2010), Czech art historian
- Anna Parker Fessenden (1896–1972), American botanist
- Anna Fino, Italian mathematician
- Anna Fischer, German chemist
- Anna Lockhart Flanigen (1852–1928), American chemist
- Anna Foà (1876–1944), Italian entomologist
- Anna Fontcuberta i Morral, Spanish-Swiss physicist and materials scientist
- Anna Frebel, German astronomer
- Anna Freud (1895–1982), Austrian-British psychoanalyst
- Anna Martha Fullerton (1853–1938), American medical doctor and educator
- Anna van der Gaag, health care professional
- Anna M. Gade, American Islamic scholar
- Anna Jo Garcia Haynes (born 1934), early childhood educator in Colorado
- Anna H. Gayton (1899–1977), American anthropologist
- Anna Geifman (born 1962), American historian
- Anna Gelman (1902–1991), Soviet chemist
- Anna Gelpern, Russian-American legal scholar
- Anna Ní Ghallachair, Irish academic and scholar
- Anna C. Gilbert, American mathematician
- Anna Estelle Glancy (1883–1975), American astronomer
- Anna Gloyn, endocrinologist and geneticist
- Anna Glushenkova (1926–2017), Uzbek chemist
- Anna Goldenberg, Russian-born computer scientist
- Anna Goldfeder (1898–1993), Austrian medical researcher
- Anna Grassellino, Italian physicist
- Anna Grear (born 1959), British legal scholar
- Anna Grzymala (born 1970), American political scientist
- Anna Gurney (1795–c. 1857), British academic
- Anna Haebich (born 1949), Australian historian and academic
- Anna Hájková (born 1978), Czech-British historian
- Anna Halafoff, Australian sociologist and academic
- Anna Hamilton (1864–1935), French medical doctor
- Anna Hansell, British medical doctor
- Anna M. Harkness (1837–1926), American philanthropist
- Anna J. Harrison (1912–1998), American organic chemist
- Anna Cope Hartshorne (1860–1957), American educator
- Anna Hasenfratz, Hungarian-American physicist
- Anna Hassan, British educator
- Anna Granville Hatcher (1905–1978), American linguist
- Anna Heer (1863–1918), Swiss medical doctor
- Anna Petronella van Heerden (1887–1975), first Afrikaner woman to qualify as a doctor in South Africa
- Anna Heikel (1838–1907), Finnish educator and Baptist pioneer
- Anna Hirsch, German chemist
- Anna-Liisa Hirviluoto (1929–2000), Finnish archaeologist
- Anna Sui Hluan, Burmese linguist
- Anna Pierce Hobbs Bixby (c. 1810–c. 1870), American doctor and scientist
- Anna Honzáková (1875–1940), Czech medical doctor
- Anna Elsa Hornum (1877–1971), Danish archaeologist
- Anna Camaiti Hostert (born 1949), American philosopher
- Anna Hude (1858–1934), Denmark's first female history graduate
- Anna Hudson (born 1963), Canadian art historian
- Anna Regina Husová (1857–1945), Czech teacher, writer and cultural historian
- Anna Huttenlocher, American medical doctor
- Anna Hyndráková (1928–2022), Czech historian
- Anna Ingerman (1868–1931), American medical doctor
- Anna Darius Ishaku (born 1957), Nigerian philanthropist
- Anna Louise James (1886–1977), American pharmacist
- A. Cecile J.W. Janssens (1968–2022), Dutch epidemiologist
- Anna T. Jeanes (1822–1907), American philanthropist
- Anna Eliza Jenkins (1886–1973), American mycologist and plant pathologist
- Anna Jespersen (1895–1989), American geologist
- Anna Johnston (born 1976), Australian hematologist
- Anna Jonas Stose (1881–1974), American geologist
- Anna G. Jónasdóttir (born 1942), Icelandic political scientist
- Anna Karaszewska (born 1970), Polish sociologist, economic and social activist
- Anna Karlin (born 1960), American computer scientist
- Anna Kharadze (1905–1971), Soviet-Georgian botanist
- Anna Luise Kirkengen (born 1946), Norwegian medical doctor and professor
- Anna Köhler, German physicist
- Anna Koltunow, Australian plant physiologist
- Anna Koorders-Schumacher (1870–1934), Dutch botanist
- Anna Kortelainen (born 1968), Finnish scholar, art historian, and writer
- Anna Kreshuk, scientist
- Anna Zofia Krygowska (1904–1988), Polish mathematician
- Anna Krylov (born 1967), theoretical chemist
- Anna Kuzemko (born 1974), Ukrainian scientist
- Anna Lalor Burdick (1869–1944), American educator
- Anna Larroucau Laborde de Lucero (1864–1956), French-Argentine philanthropist and educator
- Anna Lawniczak, applied mathematician
- Anna Leander, Danish sociologist and political scientist
- Anna Lembke (born 1967), American psychiatrist
- Anna Leon-Guerrero, sociologist
- Anna Leonowens (1831–1915), British educator
- Anna Laura Lepschy (born 1933), Italian linguist
- Anna Levinson (1939–2015), German zoologist
- Anna Lewis (1885–1961), historian specialized in American history
- Anna Suk-Fong Lok, American gastroenterologist
- Anna Lubiw, Canadian computer scientist
- Anna W. Ludlow (1865–1955), Choctaw teacher
- Anna Lukens (1844–1917), American medical doctor
- Anna Machin, British evolutionary anthropologist
- Anna Macleod (1917–2004), Scottish biochemist
- Anna Mani (1918–2001), Indian physicist and meteorologist
- Anna K. Mapp (born 1970), American chemist
- Anna Marciniak-Czochra (born 1974), Polish mathematician
- Anna Mar (1887–1917), Russian screenwriter, novelist and journalist
- Anna Marsh (1770–1834), American philanthropist
- Anna Maurizio (1900–1993), Swiss botanist
- Anna Mazzucato, American mathematician
- Anna McAllister (1888–1961), American historian
- Anna Marguerite McCann (1933–2017), American art historian and archaeologist
- Anna J. McKeag (1864–1947), American psychologist and college president
- Anna McPherson (1901–1979), Canadian physicist
- Anna Mela-Papadopoulou (1871–1938), Greek nurse
- Anna Melyukova (1921–2004), Russian archaeologist
- Anna Merz (1931–2013), English conservationist
- Anna Michalak, American geophysicist
- Anna Middleton, social scientist
- Anna Mikusheva (born 1976), Russian economist
- Anna Minguzzi, Italian physicist
- Anna Missuna (1868–1922), Russian geologist
- Anna Mitus, medical researcher
- Anna Molofsky, American psychiatrist and glial biologist
- Anna Monro (born 1969), Australian botanist
- Anna Moore, astronomer
- Anna Morpurgo Davies (1937–2014), Italian philologist
- Anna Anderson Morton (1876–1961), British Egyptologist
- Anna Motz, psychologist
- Anna Isabel Mulford (1848–1943), American botanist
- Anna Mullikin (1893–1975), American mathematician and early investigator of point set theory
- Anna Nagurney (born 1954), American mathematician
- Anna Nałkowska (1862–1942), Polish geographer, educator, textbook author
- Anna Nekaris, British anthropologist and professor
- Anna Nevius, American biostatistician
- Anna Christina Nobre (born 1963), Brazilian neuroscientist
- Anna Novakov (born 1959), Serbian-American art historian
- Anna-Maja Nylén (1912–1976), Swedish ethnologist
- Anna Amelia Obermeyer (1907–2001), South African botanist
- Anna Oposa, marine conservationist
- Anna Ornstein (1927–2025), Hungarian-American psychoanalyst
- Anna Pammrová (1860–1945), Czech philosopher
- Anna Pankratova (1897–1957), Soviet historian
- Anna Panorska, Polish mathematician
- Anna Paradowska (1880–1962), Australian engineer
- Anna Parzymies (born 1939), Polish professor of oriental studies
- Anna Paues (1867–1945), Swedish philologist
- Anna Paulson, American economist
- Anna Pestalozzi-Schulthess (1738–1815), Swiss educator and philanthropist
- Anna L. Peterson (born 1963), American scholar of religious studies
- Anna-Lind Pétursdóttir, Icelandic academic
- Anna J. Phillips, American research zoologist
- Anna Philpott (born 1967), English biologist
- Anna Ploszajski, English scientist and writer
- Anna Plowden (1938–1997), British archaeological conservator and restorer
- Anna Popova (born 1960), Russian medical doctor and public health official
- Anna Longshore Potts (1829–1912), American medical doctor
- Anna Marie Prentiss, American archaeologist
- Anna Pujol Puigvehi (born 1947), Spanish archaeologist and historian
- Anna M. Quider, American astronomer and science lobbyist
- Anna Quinquaud (1890–1984), French explorer and sculptor
- Anna Giacalone Ramat (born 1937), Italian linguist
- Anna Ranta, New Zealand neurologist
- Anna Suffía Rasmussen (1876–1932), Faroese educator
- Anna Reijnvaan (1844–1920), Dutch nurse
- Anna Barbara Reinhart (1730–1796), Swiss mathematician
- Anna Euretta Richardson (1883–1931), American home economist and educator
- Anna Mann Richardson (1877–1953), American psychoanalyst
- Anna Ritchie (born 1943), British archaeologist
- Anna Gruetzner Robins, Canadian art historian
- Anna Wang Roe (born 1961), American neuroscientist
- Anna Romanowska, Polish mathematician
- Anna Rönström (1847–1920), Swedish educator
- Anna Curtenius Roosevelt, American archaeologist
- Anna Elizabeth Rude (1876–1960), American medical doctor
- Anna Russell (1807–1876), English botanist
- Anna Rutherford (1932–2001), Australian-born academic and publisher
- Anna Charlotte Ruys (1898–1977), Dutch bacteriologist
- Anna Rydlówna (1884–1969), Polish nurse
- Anna Sadurska (1924–2004), Polish classical scholar and archaeologist
- Anna Salmberg (1788–1868), Finnish educator
- Anna Salter, American psychologist
- Anna Sarkadi (born 1974), Swedish-Hungarian medical doctor and professor of public health
- Anna Scaife (born 1981), radio astronomer
- Anna Schchian (1905–1990), Russian botanist
- Anna Schober, Austrian historian
- Anna Schofield (1913–2007), early Australian Army nurse
- Anna Schwartz (1915–2012), American economist
- Anna Kay Scott (1838–1923), American medical missionary
- Anna Seigal, British mathematician
- Anna Seim (born 1974), Swedish Professor of Economics
- Anna Sethne (1872–1961), Norwegian educator and trade unionist
- Anna O. Shepard (1903–1971), American archaeologist
- Anna Sher, American plant ecologist
- Anna Sierpińska (1947–2023), Polish-Canadian mathematics educator
- Anna Siewierska (1955–2011), British linguist
- Anna Skripka, Ukrainian-American mathematician
- Anna Slater, British supramolecular chemist
- Anna Tolman Smith (1840–1917), American educator
- Anna Sofaer (born 1940), American archaeologist
- Anna Squicciarini, computer scientist
- Anna Sroka, Polish political scientist
- Anna Stafford (1905–2004), American mathematician
- Anna Stec, professor in Fire Chemistry and Toxicology
- Anna Stefanopoulou, Greek-American mechanical engineer
- Anna Stetsenko (psychologist), Soviet psychologist
- Anna-Lisa Stigell (1899–1975), Finnish architect
- Anna Stroka (1923–2020), Polish literary historian and author
- Anna Strutt, New Zealand academic
- Anna Szabolcsi, Hungarian linguist and semanticist
- Anna Taddio, Canadian pediatrician
- Anna Thornton, Italian morphologist
- Anna Thynne (1806–1866), British zoologist
- Anna Tieke (1898–1938), German communist
- Anna Tomaszewicz-Dobrska (1854–1918), Polish doctor
- Anna-Karin Tornberg (born 1971), Swedish mathematician
- Anna Tramontano (1957–2017), Italian computational biologist
- Anna Traveset, Spanish ecologist
- Anna Triandafyllidou, Greek sociologist
- Anna Augusta Truitt (1837–1920), American philanthropist, reformer, essayist
- Anna Tsing, 20th and 21st century American anthropologist
- Anna Tumarkin (1875–1951), Russian-born, naturalized Swiss academic
- Anna Tuschinski (1841–1939), esperantist
- Anna-Teresa Tymieniecka (1923–2014), Polish-American philosopher
- Anna Van Meter, American clinical psychologist
- Anna Vickers (1852–1906), British psychologist
- Anna Vignoles, British economist and educationalist
- Anna Volkova, 19th century Russian chemist
- Anna Lavinia Van Benschoten (1866–1927), American mathematician
- Anna Wåhlin, Swedish Antarctic oceanographer
- Anna Wald, American epidemiologist and clinical virology researcher
- Anna Warouw (1898–1979), Indonesian medical doctor
- Anna May Waters (1903–1987), Canadian nurse
- Anna Watts, Dutch physicist
- Anna F. Weaver (1874–1951), American educator
- Anna Weber-van Bosse (1852–1942), Dutch phycologist
- Anna Weinberg (psychologist), Canadian psychologist
- Anna Weizmann (1886–1963), Israeli chemist
- Anna Johnson Pell Wheeler (1883–1966), American mathematician
- Anna Scripps Whitcomb (1866–1953), American horticulturalist and philanthropist
- Anna Whitelock, British historian and academic
- Anna Wienhard, German mathematician
- Anna Wierzbicka (born 1938), Polish linguist
- Anna Wessels Williams (1863–1954), American bacteriologist
- Anna-Lise Williamson, professor of Virology
- Anna Winlock (1857–1904), American astronomer
- Anna Wolcott Vaile (1868–1928), American educator
- Anna Irwin Young (1873–1920), American mathematician
- Anna Youngman, American economist and writer
- Anna Zádor (1904–1995), Hungarian historian
- Anna Zakrisson (born 1980), Swedish science communicator
- Anna Żarnowska (1931–2007), Polish historian
- Anna Zdunik, Polish mathematician
- Anna Zeide, American academic and author
- Anna Zhuchkova (born 1979), Russian academic
- Anna N. Żytkow (born 1947), Polish astrophysicist

=== Activism ===
- Anna Åbergsson (1871–1937), Swedish activist
- Anna Alboth, Polish activist and journalist
- Anna Mae Aquash (1945–1975), First Nations activist
- Anna Baltzer, American human rights activist
- Anna Bateson (c. 1830–1918), English suffragist
- Anna Smeed Benjamin (1834–1924), American social reformer
- Anna Bossman (born 1957), Ghanaian human rights advocate
- Anna V. Brown (c. 1914–1985), African American advocate for the elderly
- Anna Caspari Agerholt (1892–1943), Norwegian women's rights activist
- Anna Clemenc (1888–1956), American labor activist
- Anna Dodonova (1888–1967), Bolshevik activist and intellectual
- Anna Dominiczak (born 1954), Polish-born British medical researcher
- Anna Dormitzer (1830–1903), American suffragette
- Anna B. Eckstein (1868–1947), German pacifist
- Anna Edinger (1863–1921), German activist and women's rights campaigner
- Anna Féresse-Deraismes (1821–1910), French feminist activist
- Anna Filosofova (1837–1912), Russian activist
- Anna Klara Fischer (1887–1967), German political activist
- Anna Gardner (1816–1901), American abolitionist, poet, teacher
- Anna Geddes (1857–1917), English social activist
- Anna Gjøstein (1869–1956), Norwegian women's rights pioneer
- Anna Goldsteiner (1899–1944), Viennese resistance activist during World War II
- Anna Adams Gordon (1853–1931), American social reformer
- Lady Anna Gore-Langton (1820–1879), English women's rights campaigner
- Anna M. Hammer (1840–1910), American philanthropist and temperance movement leader
- Anna Haslam (1829–1922), Irish suffragist
- Anna Hazare (born 1937), Indian activist
- Anna Arnold Hedgeman (1899–1990), American civil rights leader and politician
- Anna Hierta-Retzius (1841–1924), Swedish women's rights activist and philanthropist
- Anna Hutsol (born 1984), Ukrainian feminist
- Anna Jacobsen (1924–2004), Norwegian champion of the Southern Sami language and culture
- Anna Jasińska (1867–1957), Polish activist and politician
- Anna Jonas (1839–1900), German women's activist and educator
- Anna H. Jones (1855–1932), Canadian-born American suffragist
- Anna Kisil, British social activist
- Anna Kleman (1862–1940), Swedish women's rights activist and pacifist
- Anna Kuliscioff (1857–1925), Russian feminist revolutionary
- Anna Matilda Larrabee (1842–1931), American social leader
- Anna Leibbrand (1902–1972), German political activist and writer
- Anna Lewis (1889–1976), British suffragette, member of the militant Women's Social and Political Union
- Anna Lindsay (1845–1903), Scottish women's activist
- Anna-Katharina Messmer, German consultant, sociologist, and speaker
- Anna George de Mille (1878–1947), American feminist and Georgist activist
- Anna Euphemia Morgan (1874–1935), Australian Aboriginal leader
- Anna Munro (1881–1962), British suffragist
- Anna Johansdotter Norbäck (1804–1879), Swedish religious leader
- Anna Oliver (1840–1892), American preacher and activist
- Anna Gifty Opoku-Agyeman, Ghanaian-born American activist and writer
- Anna Pappritz (1861–1939), German suffragist
- Anna Catherine Parnell (1852–1911), Irish nationalist
- Anna Pavlyk (1855–1928), Ukrainian activist and writer
- Anna Pennybacker (1861–1938), American suffragette
- Anna Sophia Polak (1874–1943), Dutch Jewish feminist and author
- Anna Rice Powell, American activist
- Anna Henryka Pustowójtówna (1838–1881), Polish activist
- Anna Rasmussen, Samoan climate activist
- Anna Rankin Riggs (1835–1908), American social reformer
- Anna Rochester (1880–1966), American labor reformer, journalist, and activist
- Anna Rozental (1872–1940), Belarusian and Soviet Bundist activist
- Anna Sharyhina, Ukrainian feminist and LGBT rights activist
- Anna Howard Shaw (1847–1919), American women's suffrage leader
- Anna Bustill Smith (c. 1862–1945), African-American suffragist
- Anna Stonum (1958–1999), American artist and disability rights activist based in Chicago
- Anna Stout (1858–1931), New Zealand social reformer
- Anna Strasser (1921–2010), Austrian WWII resistance activist
- Anna Suckling (1863–1946), English Girl Guide leader
- Anna Szelągowska (1879–1962), Polish feminist and Union organizer
- Anna Walentynowicz (1929–2010), Polish free trade union activist
- Anna Whitehead Bodeker (1826–1904), American suffragist
- Anna Whitlock (1852–1930), Swedish reformer and suffragette
- Anna Yakimova (1856–1942), Russian revolutionary

=== Aristocracy ===
- Anna-Teodora, Bulgarian princess
- Anna Pak Agi (1782–1839), catholic saint, one of the Korean martyrs
- Anna of Austria, multiple people
- Anna Abrikosova (1882–1936), Russian catholic religious sister and translator
- Anna Alexander (1865–1947), American episcopal deaconess and saint
- Anna Amalia, Abbess of Quedlinburg (1723–1787), Prussian princess
- Anna Anachoutlou (died 1342), empress of Trebizond
- Anna Andersdotter, Swedish noble
- Anna Komnene Angelina, empress consort of Nicaea
- Anna Baryatinskaya (1772–1825), Russian countess
- Anna de Beaumont, Lady of Valtierra
- Anna of Bentheim-Tecklenburg (1579–1624), German princess
- Anna Bielke, Swedish commander
- Anne of Bohemia, multiple people
- Anna Borkowska, Polish former Dominican nun
- Anna Bornemisza (1630–1688), Princess Consort of Transylvania
- Anna van Borselen (1472–1518), Netherlandish noble
- Anna of Brandenburg (1487–1514), Duchess consort of Schleswig and Holstein
- Anna Sofie Bülow (1745–1787), Danish aristocrat
- Anna Cabrera Ximénez, Italian ruler
- Anna Chiappe (1898–1990), wife and chronicler of José Carlos Mariátegui
- Anna of Cilli (died 1416), queen consort of Poland
- Anna of Cleves, multiple people
- Anna Dalassene, Byzantine noblewoman
- Anna Dandolo, queen consort of Serbia
- Anna Dorothea, Abbess of Quedlinburg (1657–1704), Princess Abbess of Quedlinburg
- Anna Diogenissa, Byzantine noblewoman
- Anna Angelina Komnene Doukaina (died 1258), queen consort of Serbia
- Anna of East Anglia (died 654), king of the East Angles
- Anna van Egmont (1533–1558), Dutch noble, first wife of William the Silent
- Anna Eleonore of Hesse-Darmstadt (1601–1659), Duchess of Brunswick-Lüneburg by marriage
- Anna Eltringham, British Anglican priest
- Anna d'Este (1531–1607), Italian-born French princess
- Anna van Ewsum, Dutch noblewoman
- Anna Friederike of Promnitz-Pless (1711–1750), German princess
- Anna of Glogau, Polish noblewoman
- Anna Isabella Gonzaga (1655–1703), duchess consort of Mantua and Montferrat
- Anna Greenwood-Lee, Canadian Anglican bishop
- Anna Gruzinskaya Tolstaya (1798–1889), Georgian princess
- Anna Margareta von Haugwitz (1622–1673), Swedish countess
- Anna-Nicole Heinrich, German church official
- Countess Anna Henckel von Donnersmarck (born 1973), German filmmaker and aristocrat
- Anna of Hesse (1529–1591), Holy Roman Empire princess
- Anna of Hohenstaufen (1230–1307), Empress of Nicaea
- Anna of Hungary, multiple people
- Anna of Isenburg-Büdingen (1460–1522), German noblewoman
- Anna Jagiellon (1523–1596), ruler of Poland-Lithuania from 1575 to 1587
- Anna Jagiellon, Duchess of Pomerania (1476–1503), Duchess consort of Pomerania
- Anna Kaiulani (1842–?), noble during the Kingdom of Hawaii
- Anna of Kashin (1280–1368), Russian princess and saint
- Anna Khanum (died 1647), Queen consort of Iran, wife of Safi I
- Anna Kolesárová (1928–1944), Slovak blessed and martyr
- Anna Komnene (1083–1153), daughter of Byzantine Emperor Alexius I and writer of the Alexiad
- Anna Leopoldovna (1718–1746), regent of Russia
- Anna of Lorraine (1522–1568), princess of the house of Lorraine
- Anna Mackenzie (1621–1707), Scottish courtier
- Anna Mahé (1882–1960), French anarchist
- Anna Makkavaiou of Asia Minor, Greek Orthodox nun
- Anna of Masovia (1498–1557), Polish noble
- Anna Matyushkina (1722–1784), Russian courtier
- Anna Maximovitch, Russian Red Orchestra informer
- Anna of Mecklenburg-Schwerin (1627–1669), Mecklenburgian royal
- Anna de' Medici, Archduchess of Austria (1616–1676), Italian noble, Austrian royal consort
- Anna of Moscow, empress consort of the Byzantine Empire
- Anna Katharina von Offen (1624–1702), German courtier and Royal governess
- Anna Karolina Orzelska (1707–1769), Countess Orzelska
- Anna Palaiologina (died 1320), Byzantine princess
- Anna Pavlovna of Russia (1795–1865), Queen consort of the Netherlands, wife of William II
- Anna Petre, British Roman Catholic nobility
- Anna Philanthropene, empress consort of Manuel III of Trebizond
- Anna Fredericka Philippine of Schleswig-Holstein-Sonderburg-Wiesenburg (1665–1748), German noblewoman
- Anna of Poland, multiple people
- Anna Polovetskaya, grand princess consort of Kiev
- Anna Porphyrogenita (963–1011), Grand Princess consort of Kiev
- Anna Weed Prosser (1846–1902), American evangelist
- Anna Davenport Raines (1853–1915), Founding Member of the United Daughters of the Confederacy
- Anna Rasmussen (1898–1983), Danish spiritualist
- Anna Russell, Duchess of Bedford (1783–1857), British noble
- Anna of Russia, multiple people
- Anna of Ryazan, Russian noblewoman, regent of the Ryazan Principality of 1483 and in 1500–1501
- Anna Salome of Manderscheid-Blankenheim, abbess from 1648 to 1691
- Anna of Savoy (1306–1365), Byzantine Empress consort
- Anna of Saxony, multiple people
- Anna Schäffer (1882–1925), German Roman Catholic saint
- Anna von Schweidnitz, 14th century Holy Roman Empress
- Anna of Serbia, multiple people
- Anna Sforza (1476–1497), hereditary princess of Ferrara, Modena, and Reggio
- Anna Sibylle of Hanau-Lichtenberg (1542–1580), German noblewoman
- Anna of Sweden (1545–1610), Countess Palatine of Veldenz
- Anna of Trebizond (died 1342), Empress of Trebizond
- Anna of Tyrol (1585–1618), Holy Roman Empress
- Anna Utenhoven, Anabaptist martyr in the Spanish Netherlands
- Anna Catherine Constance Vasa (1619–1651), Hereditary Countess Palatine of Neuburg
- Anna Vasa of Sweden (1568–1625), Swedish princess
- Anna Vyrubova (1884–1964), Russian Empire lady-in-waiting
- Anna of Wallachia, empress consort of Bulgaria
- Anna Wang (1886–1900), Catholic Saint
- Anna of Württemberg (1561–1616), Duchess of Legnica
- Anna Xylaloe, empress consort of Manuel I of Trebizond
  - Zarghona Anaa, (d. 1772) mother of Afghanistan's founder Ahmad Shah Durrani

=== Arts and entertainment ===
- Anna-Lisa (1933–2018), Norwegian actress and puppeteer
- Anna Amalie Abert (1906–1996), German musicologist
- Anna Barbara Abesch (1706–1773), Swiss artist
- Anna Adelaïde Abrahams (1849–1930), Dutch still life painter
- Anna Abreu (born 1990), Finnish-Portuguese singer
- Anna Acton (born 1977), English actress
- Anna Adams Gordon (1853–1931), American social reformer
- Anna Aglatova (born 1982), Russian soprano singer
- Anna Molka Ahmed (1917–1994), Pakistani painter artist
- Anna Airy (1882–1964), English painter and etcher
- Anna Akana (born 1989), American YouTuber, actress, musician, comedian and filmmaker
- Anna Margarita Albelo, Cuban-American filmmaker
- Anna Maria Alberghetti (born 1936), Italian-born operatic singer and actress
- Anna Alchuk (1955–2008), Russian painter, poet and author
- Anna Allen Martin (born 1977), Spanish actress
- Anna Alma-Tadema (1867–1943), British artist
- Anna Amendola (1931–2019), Italian actress
- Anna de Amicis (1733–1816), Italian soprano
- Anna Ammirati (born 1979), Italian actress
- Anna Ancher (1859–1935), Danish painter
- Anna Andreeva (1917–2008), Russian textile designer
- Anna Andres (born 1993), Ukrainian model
- Anna Agnér (1896–1977), Swedish painter
- Anna Anka, Swedish-American model, actress and author
- Anna Caterina Antonacci (born 1961), Italian soprano
- Anna Antonenko-Lukonina (born 1937), Russian actress
- Anna Appel (1888–1963), Romanian-born American actress
- Anna Appleby, British composer
- Anna Margaretta Archambault (1856–1956), American artist and author
- Anna Arena (1919–1974), Italian actress
- Anna Arnott, Scottish singer
- Anna Asp (born 1946), Swedish production designer and art director
- Anna Asti (born 1990), Ukrainian-Russian singer
- Anna Åström (born 1990), Swedish actress
- Anna Azerli (born 1989), New Zealand-Italian singer and model
- Anna Bache-Wiig (born 1975), Norwegian actress and writer
- Anna P. Baker (1928–1985), Canadian visual artist
- Anna Bamford (born 1989), Australian actress
- Anna Banana (1940–2024), Canadian artist
- Anna Banner (born 1995), Nigerian pageant and actress
- Anna Barbara Bansi (1777–1863), French artist
- Anna Bård (born 1980), Danish actress and model
- Anna Grace Barlow (born 1994), American actress
- Anna Báró (1920–1994), Hungarian actress
- Anna Barriball, British artist based in South London
- Anna Barsukova (born 1981), Russian film director and screenwriter
- Anna Bartels (1869–1950), Swedish operatic soprano
- Anna Baryshnikov (born 1992), American actress
- Anna Bass (1876–1961), French sculptor
- Anna-Lisa Baude (1897–1968), Swedish actress
- Anna Baumgart (born 1966), Polish artist
- Anna Bazhutova (born c. 1993), Russian streamer
- Anna Bederke, German actress
- Anna Behlmer, American sound engineer
- Anna Belknap (born 1972), American actress
- Anna de Belocca (1854–?), Russian opera singer
- Anna Ben, Indian actress
- Anna Benson (born 1976), American model
- Anna Bergendahl (born 1991), Swedish singer
- Anna Berger (1922–2014), American actress
- Anna Theresa Berger Lynch (1853–1925), American musician
- Anna Bergman (born 1948), Swedish actress
- Anna-Eva Bergman (1909–1987), Norwegian artist
- Anna Bergström-Simonsson (1853–1937), Swedish voice teacher
- Anna Bethell (1882–1969), British actress and singer
- Anna-Liisa Bezrodny, Estonian violinist
- Anna Bilińska (1854–1893), Polish artist
- Anna Biller, film director
- Anna Billing (1849–1927), Swedish painter
- Anna Bishop (1810–1884), English operatic soprano
- Anna Björk (born 1970), Swedish actress
- Anna-Lisa Björling (1910–2006), Swedish opera singer and actress
- Anna Bjorn (born 1954), Icelandic graphic designer, filmmaker, model and actress
- Anna Bloch (1868–1953), Danish stage actress
- Anna Katharina Block (1642–1719), German artist
- Anna Blomberg (born 1972), Swedish actress and comedian
- Anna Blunden (1829–c. 1915), English painter
- Anna Boberg (1864–1935), Swedish artist
- Anna Boch (1848–1936), Belgian painter
- Anna Bochkoltz (1815–1879), German operatic soprano, voice teacher and composer
- Anna Boghiguian, Egyptian contemporary artist
- Anna Bon (1738–c. 1769), Italian composer
- Anna Bonaiuto (born 1950), Italian actress
- Anna Bondra (1798–1836), Austrian soprano
- Anna Bonitatibus, Italian opera singer
- Anna Book (born 1970), Swedish singer
- Anna Borg (1903–1963), Danish-Icelandic actress
- Anna Borisoglebskaya (1868–1939), Russian actor
- Anna Borkowska (1916–2008), Polish-Iranian actress
- Anna Botova (born 1987), Russian singer
- Anna Bourma (born 1978), Greek singer of Pontian origin
- Anna Brandoli (born 1945), Italian comic book artist
- Anna Brecon, English actress
- Anna Brenko (1848–1934), Russian actress
- Anna Brewster (born 1986), British actress
- Anna Richards Brewster (1870–1952), American painter
- Anna Brisbin (born 1991), American YouTuber
- Anna Broinowski, Australian filmmaker
- Anna Brüggemann (born 1981), German actress and screenwriter
- Anna Francisca de Bruyns (1604–1675), French artist
- Anna Bulbrook, American violinist
- Anna Mae Bullock (1938–2023), American singer, better known as Tina Turner
- Anna Burch, American musical artist
- Anna Butkevich (born 1985), Ukrainian TV presenter and actress
- Anna Calder-Marshall (born 1947), English actress
- Anna Calvi (born 1980), British musician
- Anna Camner (born 1977), Swedish artist
- Anna Camp (born 1982), American actress and singer
- Anna Campori (1917–2018), Italian actress
- Anna Capodaglio (1879–1961), Italian actress
- Anna Carena (1899–1990), Italian actress
- Anna Carina (born 1981), Peruvian pop singer
- Anna Carlsson (born 1973), German voice actress
- Anna Lee Carroll (1930–2017), American actress
- Anna Carteret (born 1942), British actress
- Anna Case (1887–1984), American soprano opera singer
- Anna-Jane Casey (born 1972), English singer, dancer and actress
- Anna Caselberg (1942–2004), New Zealand painter
- Anna Casparsson (1861–1961), Swedish textile artist
- Anna Cassel (1860–1937), Swedish artist
- Anna Castillo (born 1993), Spanish actress
- Anna Cathcart (born 2003), Canadian actress
- Anna Cervin (1878–1972), Swedish artist
- Anna Chancellor (born 1965), English actress
- Anna Chandler (1884–1957), American actress and singer
- Anna Chappell (1925–2005), Canadian-American actress
- Anna Chazelle (born 1987), American actress
- Anna Chell (born 1998), English actress
- Anna Cheyne (1926–2002), Irish artist
- Anna Chipovskaya (born 1987), Russian actress
- Anna Chlumsky (born 1980), American actress
- Anna Choy (born 1978), Australian actress and presenter
- Anna-Lisa Christiane (born 1994), New Zealand model
- Anna Christy, American soprano opera singer
- Anna Chromy (1940–2021), Czech-German painter and sculptor
- Anna Ciepielewska (1936–2006), Polish actress
- Anna Ciocchetti (born 1968), Spanish-born Mexican singer and actress
- Anna Clendening (born 1993), American singer, actor and Internet personality
- Anna Clyne (born 1980), English composer
- Anna Coddington (born 1981), New Zealand singer
- Anna Margaret Collins (born 1996), American singer-songwriter and actress
- Anna Conway, American painter
- Anna Coogan, American singer-songwriter
- Anna Miller Corbell (1896–1993), American painter
- Anna Craig (born 1993), American singer-songwriter
- Anna Cramer (1873–1968), Dutch composer
- Anna Craycroft, American conceptual artist
- Anna Crilly (born 1975), Irish actress and comedian
- Anna Christina Cronquist (1807–1893), Swedish artist
- Anna Cropper (1938–2007), English actress
- Anna Cummer (born 1977), Canadian actress
- Anna Cymmerman, Polish operatic soprano
- Anna Cyzon (born 1983), Canadian actress
- Anna Czekanowska-Kuklińska (1929–2021), Polish musicologist and ethnographer
- Anna Dabis (1847–1927), German artist
- Anna Dagmar, American singer-songwriter
- Anna Dammann (1912–1993), German actress
- Anna Danes (born 1969), American singer-songwriter
- Anna Daučíková, Slovak visual artist and activist
- Anna Davia (1743–1811), Italian opera singer
- Anna David (born 1984), Danish R&B and soul singer
- Anna Dawson (born 1937), British actress
- Anna Rita Del Piano (born 1966), Italian actress and theater director
- Anna Demetrio (1890–1959), Italian-born American film actress
- Anna Demetriou (born 1993), English actress and Twitch streamer
- Anna Depenbusch (born 1977), German singer and musician
- Anna Dereszowska (born 1981), Polish actress and singer
- Anna DeShawn (born 1983), American media personality and podcaster
- Anna Diop (born 1988), Senegalese-American actress
- Anna Dodge (1867–1945), American actress
- Anna Vittoria Dolara (1754–1827), Italian painter
- Anna Domino (born 1955), American singer-songwriter
- Anna Drezen, American writer, actress and comedian
- Anna Drijver (born 1983), Dutch actress and model
- Anna Dymna (born 1951), Polish actress
- Anna Easteden (born 1976), Finnish-American actress
- Anna Elbakyan (born 1963), Armenian actress
- Anna Eller (1887–1942), Estonian pianist
- Anna Ulrica Ericsson (born 1966), Swedish actress
- Anna Eriksson, (born 1977) Finnish singer
- Anna Erlandsson (born 1956), Swedish short film creator, designer, illustrator and animator
- Anna Erler-Schnaudt (1877–1963), German contralto and singing teacher
- Anna Ewers (born 1993), German fashion model
- Anna Exl (1882–1969), Austrian actress
- Anna F. (born 1985), Australian singer-songwriter and actress
- Anna Fafaliou, Greek conceptual artist
- Anna Faith (born 1995), American cosplayer
- Anna Falchi (born 1972), Finnish-Italian model and actress
- Anna Faris, (born 1976) American actress
- Anna Favella (born 1983), Italian stage, television and movie actress
- Anna Fedorova (born 1990), Ukrainian musician
- Anna Fegi (born 1977), Filipino singer and actress
- Anna Feldhusen (1867–1951), German painter
- Anna Findlay (1885–1968), British artist and printmaker
- Anna Fischer (born 1986), German actress
- Anna S. Fisher (1873–1942), American artist and teacher
- Anna Fitziu (1887–1967), American soprano
- Anna Foerster, American film director
- Anna Foglietta (born 1979), Italian actress
- Anna Folkema (1695–1768), Dutch artist
- Anna Foster, English radio and TV presenter, singer and voice over artist
- Anna Fougez (1894–1966), Italian singer and actress
- Anna Belle Francis, Singaporean entertainer and singer
- Anna Francolini (born 1973), English actress
- Anna Frangiosa, American cabaret performer
- Anna Frants (born 1965), Russian-American painter
- Anna Friel, (born 1976), English actress
- Anna Friz (born 1970), Canadian artist and musician
- Anna-Lisa Frykman (1889–1960), Swedish musical artist
- Anna Führing (1866–1929), German actress
- Anna Galeotti (1739–1773), Italian artist
- Anna Galiena (born 1954), Italian actress
- Anna Galvin (born 1969), Australian actress
- Anna Garcin-Mayade (1897–1981), French painter
- Anna Gardell-Ericson (1853–1939), Swedish artist
- Anna Gardie (died 1798), American actress
- Anna Gare (born 1969), Australian musician and TV personality
- Anna Garwolinska (born 1965), Polish actress
- Anna Rosina de Gasc (1713–1783), German artist
- Anna Gebert (born 1979), Polish-born Finnish musician
- Anna Margarethe Geiger (1783–1809), German painter
- Anna Geislerová (born 1976), Czech actress
- Anna George, Indian-born American actress
- Anna Gerasimova (born 1961), Russian singer
- Anna German (1936–1982), Russian-Polish singer
- Anna Gerresheim (1852–1921), German painter
- Anna Marcella Giffard (1707–1777), Irish actress
- Anna Gilbert, American singer-songwriter
- Anna Gildemeester (1867–1945), Dutch painter
- Anna Caterina Gilli, Italian artist
- Anna Ginsburg, British film director
- Anna Girò, Italian mezzo-soprano
- Anna Glynn, Australian artist
- Anna Godenius (born 1944), Swedish actress
- Anna Goldsworthy (born 1974), Australian classical pianist and writer
- Anna Golubkina (1864–1927), Russian sculptor
- Anna Goodman, American songwriter
- Anna Gardner Goodwin (1874–1959), American composer
- Anna Göransdotter (1797–1867), Swedish artist
- Anna Gornostaj (born 1960), Polish actress
- Anna Gorshkova (born 1983), Russian actress and model
- Anna Goryachova (born 1983), Russian opera singer
- Anna Gottlieb (1774–1856), Austrian opera singer
- Anna Gourari (born 1972), German musician
- Anna Graceman (born 1999), American musician
- Anna Graves (born 1978), American actress
- Anna-Geneviève Greuze (1762–1842), French artist
- Anna Grima (born 1958), Maltese artist
- Anna Grobecker (1827–1908), German opera singer
- Anna Groff Bryant (1860–1941), American singer
- Anna Gunn (born 1968), American actress
- Anna Gutto, Norwegian-American director, writer and actress
- Anna Mila Guyenz (born 1995), German fashion model
- Anna Guzik (born 1976), Polish actress
- Anna Guzik (1909–1994), Soviet-Jewish and Israeli actress
- Anna Schuleit Haber, German-American artist
- Anna Hachimine (born 1989), Japanese actress
- Anna Hagelstam (1883–1946), Finnish opera singer
- Anna Halprin (1920–2021), American dancer
- Anna Handler (born 1996), German musical artist
- Anna Hanski (born 1970), Finnish singer and actress
- Anna Eliza Hardy (1839–1934), American painter
- Anna t'Haron (born 1978), Russian pianist
- Anna Harr (born 2000), American actress
- Anna Short Harrington (1897–1955), American model
- Anna Harvey (1944–2018), Editorial Director of Condé Nest
- Anna Hashimoto (born 1989), British clarinetist
- Anna Haugh (born 1980), Irish chef
- Anna von Hausswolff (born 1986), Swedish musician
- Anna Haverland (1854–1908), German stage actress
- Anna Hegner (1881–1963), Swiss musician
- Anna Heidenhain, German artist
- Anna Heinel (1753–1808), German ballerina
- Anna Held (1872–1918), broadway stage performer
- Anna Henckel-Donnersmarck (born 1973), German filmmaker and curator
- Anna Henriques-Nielsen (1881–1962), Danish actress
- Anna Hepp, German filmmaker, artist and photographer
- Anna Herrmann (born 1987), German actress
- Anna Goodman Hertzberg (1864–1937), American musician
- Anna Higgs, English film producer
- Anna Althea Hills (1882–1930), American painter
- Anna Hirzel-Langenhan (1874–1951), Swiss classical pianist
- Anna Holbrook (born 1957), American actress
- Anna Höllering (1895–1987), Austrian film editor
- Anna Hollmann (born 1983), German comic book artist
- Anna Cornelia Holt, Dutch painter
- Anna Home (born 1938), English television producer and executive
- Anna Homler (born 1948), American visual, performance and vocal artist
- Anna Hope (born 1974), British actress
- Anna Hopkins (born 1987), Canadian actress
- Anna Hornby (1914–1996), English painter
- Anna Höstman (born 1972), Canadian composer
- Anna Hotchkis (1885–1984), Scottish artist, writer and lecturer
- Anna Howard, Australian cinematographer
- Anna Mary Howitt (1824–1884), English painter and writer
- Anna Sew Hoy, American sculptor
- Anna Hruby (born 1960), Australian actress
- Anna Huber, Austrian fashion model
- Anna Hope Hudson (1869–1957), American painter
- Anna Hyatt Huntington (1876–1973), American sculptor
- Anna Hutchison (born 1986) is a New Zealand actress and producer
- Anna Iberszer (born 1976), Polish actress, dancer, and choreographer
- Anna Identici (born 1947), Italian pop/folk singer and television personality
- Anna Ilczuk (born 1981), Polish actress
- Anna Indermaur (1894–1980), Swiss artist
- Anna Inglese, 15th-century Italian singer
- Anna Iriyama (born 1995), Japanese idol singer (AKB48)
- Anna Ishibashi (born 1992), Japanese model and actress
- Anna Ishii (born 1998), Japanese dancer, actress and model
- Anna K. Jacobs, Australian composer, lyricist and book writer
- Anna Jagodzińska (born 1987), Polish model
- Anna Jantar (1950–1980), Polish singer
- Anna Jaquez, American sculptor
- Anna Jarmolowska (died 2023), Polish artist
- Anna Järvinen (born 1970), Swedish-Finnish singer and musician
- Anna Javorková (born 1952), Slovak actress
- Anna Jermolaewa (born 1970), Austrian conceptual artist
- Anna Jobarteh (born 1996), English actress
- Anna Jóelsdóttir, Icelandic artist
- Anna Johansson (1860–1917), Russian ballerina
- Anna Judic (1849–1911), French comic actress
- Anna Jullienne (born 1982), New Zealand actress
- Anna Kristina Kallin (1953–2004), Swedish singer and actor
- Anna Kallina (1874–1948), Austrian actress
- Anna Kamenkova (born 1953), Soviet and Russian actress
- Anna Kanakis (1962–2023), Italian actress and model
- Anna Karabessini (1923–2018), Greek singer-songwriter
- Anna Karen (1936–2022), South African-born British actress
- Anna Karina (1940–2019), Danish-French actress
- Anna Kashfi (1934–2015), British actress
- Anna Kasyan (born 1981), French opera singer
- Anna Katarina (born 1956), Swiss actress
- Anna Kaufmann, German operatic soprano
- Anna Kazejak-Dawid (born 1979), Polish director and screenwriter
- Anna Keaveney (1949–2004), English actress
- Anna Kendrick (born 1985), American film and stage actress
- Anna Kepe, American actress
- Anna Kern (1800–1879), Russian socialite and memoirist
- Anna Kernkamp (1868–1947), Belgian artist
- Anna Kerth (born 1980), Polish actress
- Anna Rose Kessler Moore, American singer-songwriter
- Anna Khaja, American actress and playwright
- Anna King, multiple people
- Anna Klas (1912–1999), Estonian pianist
- Anna Klein (1883–1941), German painter
- Anna Klindt Sørensen (1899–1985), Danish artist
- Anna Elizabeth Klumpke (1856–1942), American painter
- Anna Kogan (1902–1974), Russian artist
- Anna Kohlweis (born 1984), Austrian musician
- Anna Maria de Koker (1666–1698), Dutch printmaker and poet
- Anna Leonore König (1771–1854), Swedish singer and musician
- Anna Konkle (born 1987), American actress
- Anna Konstam (1914–1982), British actress
- Anna Korcz (born 1968), Polish actress
- Anna Korondi (born 1969), Hungarian soprano in opera and concert
- Anna Korsun (born 1986), Ukrainian singer, pianist, organist, conductor, composer and academic teacher
- Anna Kostrova (1909–1994), Russian artist
- Anna Kovalchuk (born 1977), Russian actress
- Anna Katharina Kränzlein (born 1980), German violinist
- Anna Krauja (born 1981), Latvian opera singer
- Anna Kubik (born 1957), Hungarian actress
- Anna Kurtycz (1970–2019), Mexican-Polish graphic artist
- Anna Kyriakou (1929–2025), Greek actress
- Anna de La Grange (1825–1905), French opera singer
- Anna LaCazio (born 1962), American vocalist
- Anna Coleman Ladd (1878–1939), American sculptor
- Anna Lambe (born 2000), Canadian actress
- Anna Lang (1874–1920), Swedish harpist
- Anna Lapwood (born 1995), English organist
- Anna Larkin, American sculptor
- Anna Larrucea (born 1984), Spanish-Filipino actress
- Anna Larsson (born 1966), Swedish contralto
- Anna-Lotta Larsson (born 1954), Swedish singer and actress
- Anna Carolina Laudon (born 1971), Swedish graphic designer
- Anna Laughlin (1885–1937), American actress
- Anna Lee (1913–2004), British actress
- Anna Lee (born 1995), American concert violinist
- Anna Leese (born 1981), New Zealand opera singer
- Anna Lefeuvrier (1888–1954), French actress
- Anna Lehmann (1876–1956), Dutch artist
- Anna Lehr (1890–1974), American actress
- Anna Leong Brophy, British comedian and actor
- Anna Letenská (1904–1942), Czech actress
- Anna Levanova (born 1988), Russian actress
- Anna Lindahl (1904–1952), Swedish actress
- Anna Severine Lindeman (1859–1938), Norwegian composer and music educator
- Anna Lindholm (born 1965), Swedish actress
- Anna-Lisa Lindzén (1888–1949), Swedish opera singer
- Anna Linhartová (born 1994), Czech actress
- Anna Lisyanskaya (1917–1999), Ukrainian and Russian theater and film actress
- Anna Litvinova (1983–2013), Russian fashion model
- Anna Carin Lock, Swedish make-up artist
- Anna Loos (born 1970), German actress and singer
- Anna Louizos (born 1957), American scenic designer and art director
- Anna Livia Löwendahl-Atomic, Swedish artist
- Anna Lownes (1842–1910), American painter
- Anna Luboshutz (1887–1975), Russian cellist
- Anna Ludmila (1903–1990), American ballet and ballroom dancer
- Anna Luna (born 1993), Filipino actress
- Anna Lunoe, Australian musical artist
- Anna Luther (1893–1960), American actress
- Anna Lynch (1865–1946), American painter
- Anna Mackmin (born 1964), British theatre director
- Anna Madeley (born 1976), English stage and TV actress
- Anna Maestri (1924–1988), Italian actress
- Anna Magnani (1908–1973), Italian actress
- Anna Mahler (1904–1988), Austrian sculptor
- Anna Makino (born 1971), Japanese singer
- Anna Malenfant (1902–1988), Canadian opera singer
- Anna Malikova (born 1965), Russian pianist
- Anna Malova (born 1974), Russian model
- Anna Malygon (born 2003), Ukrainian influencer and model
- Anna Manahan (1924–2009), Irish actress
- Anna Manel·la (1950–2019), Catalan sculptor and painter
- Anna Mantzourani (1935–1991), Greek actress
- Anna Marchesini (1953–2016), Italian actress, voice actress, comedian, impressionist and writer
- Anna Margaret (born 1996), American singer-songwriter and actress
- Anna Markland (born 1964), British pianist
- Anna Marly (1917–2006), Russian singer-songwriter
- Anna Maxwell Martin (born 1977), British actress
- Anna Massey (1937–2011), English actress
- Anna Mastro, American film director
- Anna May-Rychter (1864–1955), German painter and watercolourist
- Anna Mazzamauro (born 1938), Italian actress, comedian and television personality
- Anna Mazzotta, British visual artist
- Anna McClellan, American musician
- Anna Brelsford McCoy, American painter
- Anna McGahan (born 1988), Australian actress
- Anna McGarrigle (born 1944), Canadian singer
- Anna McNulty (born 2002), Canadian YouTuber
- Anna Melato (born 1952), Italian actress, singer and voice actor
- Anna Melikian (born 1976), Russian-Armenian filmmaker
- Anna Meredith (born 1978), Scottish musical artist
- Anna Lea Merritt (1844–1930), American painter
- Anna-Mart van der Merwe (born 1963), South African actress
- Anna Mieke, Irish folk singer
- Anna Mikhalkova (born 1974), Russian actress
- Anna von Mildenburg (1872–1947), Austrian opera singer
- Anna Milder-Hauptmann (1785–1838), German opera singer
- Anna Milewska (born 1931), Polish actress
- Anna Milo Upjohn, American painter
- Anna Mima (born 1987), American singer
- Anna Miserocchi (1925–1988), Italian actress
- Anna Mjöll (born 1970), Icelandic jazz singer and songwriter
- Anna Moffo (1932–2006), American opera singer, TV personality and actress
- Anna Molka Ahmed (1917–1994), Pakistani painter artist
- Anna Möller, German artist
- Anna Mombelli, Italian opera singer
- Anna Montanaro (born 1972), German actress
- Anna Morandi Manzolini (1714–1774), Italian artist
- Anna Morichelli Bosello, Italian soprano
- Anna Karen Morrow (1914–2009), American model and actress
- Anna Mouglalis (born 1978), French actress
- Anna Mucha (born 1980), Polish actress
- Anna Munthe-Norstedt (1854–1936), Swedish painter
- Anna Murashige (born 1998), Japanese idol singer (HKT48, NMB48)
- Anna Valentina Murch (1948–2014), British artist
- Anna Nagase (born 2005), Japanese voice actress
- Anna Nagata (born 1982), Japanese actress
- Anna Nakagawa (1965–2014), Japanese actress
- Anna Naklab (born 1993), German singer-songwriter
- Anna Nalick (born 1984), American singer and songwriter
- Anna Navarro (1933–2006), American film and television actress
- Anna Neagle (1904–1986), English stage and film actress and singer
- Anna Nechaeva (born 1976), Russian soprano singer
- Anna Neethling-Pohl (1906–1992), South African actress, performer and film producer
- Anna Negri (born 1964), Italian film director and screenwriter
- Anna Nekhames (born 1995), Russian soprano
- Anna Netrebko (born 1971), Russian Austrian operatic soprano
- Anna Nightingale (born 1990/1991), British actress
- Anna Nikulina (born 1985), Russian ballet dancer
- Anna Q. Nilsson (1888–1974), Swedish-American actress
- Anna-Stina Nilstoft (1928–2017), Swedish artist
- Anna Nordgren (1847–1916), Swedish artist
- Anna Nordlander (1843–1879), Swedish artist
- Anna-Kajsa Norman (1820–1903), Swedish composer
- Anna Norrie (1860–1957), Swedish opera singer
- Anna of the North (born 1989), Norwegian singer songwriter
- Anna Nowak (born 1966), Polish actress and TV presenter
- Anna Odell (born 1973), Swedish artist and film director
- Anna Odobescu (born 1991), Moldovan singer and actress
- Anna Ol (born 1985), Russian ballet dancer
- Anna Olin (1881–1946), Swedish actress
- Anna Olson (born 1968), American-Canadian chef
- Anna Orochko (1898–1965), Russian actress
- Anna Orso (1938–2012), Italian actress
- Anna Wynne O'Ryan (died 1928), American librettist
- Anna Oscàr, Swedish actress
- Anna Osmakowicz (born 1963), Polish singer and actress
- Anna Ostroumova-Lebedeva (1871–1955), Russian artist
- Anna Rose O'Sullivan (born 1994), English ballet dancer
- Anna Caroline Oury (1806–1880), German musician
- Anna Ione Murphy Overholser (1870–1940), American socialite
- Anna Oxa (born 1961), Italian singer
- Anna Oxygen, American singer-songwriter
- Anna Paaske (1856–1935), Norwegian opera singer and teacher
- Anna Palk (1941–1990), English actress
- Anna Panayiotopoulou (1945–2024), Greek actress
- Anna Paquin (born 1982), Canadian-born New Zealand actress
- Anna Park (born 1996), Korean-American artist
- Anna Parkina (born 1979), Russian artist
- Anna Pasetti, Italian artist
- Anna Passey (born 1984), English actress
- Anna Paulsen (1858–1895), Norwegian actress
- Anna Pavlova (1881–1931), Russian ballet dancer
- Anna Claypoole Peale (1791–1878), American painter
- Anna Pepe, also known as Anna (born 2003), Italian rapper and singer-songwriter
- Anna Pessiak-Schmerling (1834–1896), Austrian composer
- Anna Peters (painter) (1843–1926), German painter
- Anna Petersen (1845–1910), Danish painter
- Anna Ivanovna Petrova (born 1962), Ukrainian artist
- Anna Petrus (1886–1949), Swedish sculptor
- Anna Lise Phillips (born 1975), Australian actress
- Anna Phoebe (born 1981), German-British musical artist
- Anna Bacherini Piattoli (1720–1788), Italian artist
- Anna Plate (1871–1941), German painter
- Anna Pletnyova (born 1977), Russian singer, composer and songwriter
- Anna Plisetskaya (born 1971), Russian ballerina, actress and producer
- Anna-Louise Plowman (born 1972), New Zealand actress
- Anna Pniowsky (born 2005), Canadian actress
- Anna Polina (born 1989), Russian/French pornographic actress
- Anna Polívková (born 1979), Czech actress
- Anna Pollak (1912–1996), English opera singer
- Anna Polony (born 1939), Polish actress
- Anna Popplewell (born 1988), English actress
- Anna Porter, Canadian publisher and novelist
- Anna Próchniak (born 1988), Polish actress
- Anna Proclemer (1923–2013), Italian actress
- Anna Prohaska (born 1983), Austrian soprano
- Anna Prucnal (born 1940), Polish actress
- Anna Przybylska (1978–2014), Polish actress and model
- Anna Puu (born 1982), Finnish pop singer
- Anna Quayle (1932–2019), English actress
- Anna Rajan (born 1985), Indian actress
- Anna Rajecka (c. 1762 – 1832), Polish artist
- Anna E. Reid Hall, American artist
- Anna Renfer, Swiss composer
- Anna Renzi, Italian soprano (17th century)
- Anna Rezan (born 1992), Greek actress
- Anna Priscilla Risher (1875–1946), American classical composer
- Anna Risi (1839–1900), Italian art model
- Anna Fox Rochinski, American musician
- Anna Romantowska (born 1950), Polish actress
- Anna Palm de Rosa (1859–1924), Swedish artist
- Anna Rosemond (1886–1966), American actress
- Anna Ross, English actress and dramatist
- Anna Rossinelli (born 1987), Swiss singer-songwriter
- Anna Rubin, American composer
- Anna Russell (1911–2006), English-Canadian singer and comedian
- Anna Russell Jones (1902–1995), American artist
- Anna Rust (born 1995), English actress
- Anna Ruysch (1666–1741), Dutch flower painter
- Anna Rynefors (born 1974), Swedish musician
- Anna Sachse-Hofmeister (1850–1904), Austrian opera singer
- Anna Saeki (born 1980), Japanese musical artist
- Anna Safroncik (born 1981), Ukrainian-born Italian actress and model
- Anna Sahlene (born 1976), Swedish singer and actress
- Anna Sahlstén (1859–1931), Finnish painter
- Anna Sahlström (1876–1956), Swedish painter and graphic artist
- Anna Salunke, Indian film actor
- Anna Samokhina (1963–2010), Russian actress
- Anna-Katharina Samsel (born 1985), German actress
- Anna Samson (born 1989), Australian actress
- Anna M. Sands (1860–1927), American painter
- Anna Sarauw (1839–1919), Danish artist
- Anna Savva (born 1956), British actress
- Anna Sawai (born 1992), Japanese actress and singer
- Anna von Schaden (1763–1834), Austrian composer and pianist
- Anna Scheps, Russian classical pianist
- Anna Stella Schic (1922–2009), Brazilian pianist
- Anna Eugénie Schoen-René (1864–1942), German-American soprano and teacher
- Anna Schramm (1835–1916), German opera singer, soubrette and stage actress
- Anna Schudt (born 1974), German Emmy-winning actress
- Anna van Schurman (1607–1678), Dutch painter, engraver, poet and scholar
- Anna Schytte (1877–1953), Danish composer, pianist and teacher
- Anna Katharina Schwabroh (born 1979), German actress
- Anna Page Scott (1863–1925), American artist
- Anna Sedokova (born 1982), Ukrainian singer, actress and television presenter
- Anna Selezneva (born 1990), Russian fashion model
- Anna Semenovich (born 1980), Russian singer, actress, model, and former ice dancer
- Anna Sentina (born 1994), American musician, multi-instrumentalist
- Anna Shaffer (born 1992), British actress
- Anna D. Shapiro (born 1966), American theatre director
- Anna Sharma (born 1995), Nepalese film actress
- Anna Shay (1961–2023), American television personality
- Anna Vladimirovna Shurochkina, better known simply as Nyusha (born 1990), Russian singer and songwriter
- Anna Shulgina (born 1993), Russian film and stage actress, singer, and TV presenter
- Anna Shuttleworth (1927–2021), British musician
- Anna Sick (1803–1895), German composer and pianist
- Anna Silk (born 1974), Canadian actress
- Anna Simková (1931–2020), Slovak actress
- Anna Simon (born 1982), Spanish TV host
- Anna Simpson (born 1983), American actress and singer
- Anna Sipkema (1877–1933), Dutch artist and graphic designer
- Anna Šišková (born 1960), Slovak actress
- Anna Skellern (born 1985), Australian actress
- Anna Bogenholm Sloane (1867–1940), American artist
- Anna Slováčková (1995–2025), Czech actress and singer
- Anna Slyu (born 1980), Russian actress
- Anna Nicole Smith (1967–2007), American actress and television personality
- Anna Sobol-Wejman, Polish printmaker
- Anna Sokolow (1910–2000), American dance artist
- Anna Sorokina (born 1981), Russian actress
- Anna Sosenko (1909–2000), American songwriter, manager, and producer
- Anna Span (born 1972), American pornographic film director
- Anna Barbara Speckner (1902–1995), German harpsichordist
- Anna Stadling (born 1970), Swedish musical artist
- Anna Stainer-Knittel (1841–1915), Austrian painter
- Anna Huntington Stanley (1864–1907), American painter
- Anna Steiger (born 1960), American opera singer
- Anna Sten (1908–1993), Ukrainian-born American actress
- Anna Strasberg (1939–2024), American actress
- Anna Stratton, Canadian film and television producer
- Anna Stuart (born 1948), American actress
- Anna Boudová Suchardová (1870–1940), Czech painter, ceramicist, textile artist, and illustrator
- Anna Suda (born 1997), Japanese musical artist
- Anna Sueangam-iam (born 1998), Thai actress, model, and beauty pageant titleholder
- Anna Sundstrand (born 1989), Swedish singer
- Anna Suszczynska (1877–1931), Polish composer
- Anna Suvorova (1949–2023), Russian orientalist and art critic
- Anna Swenonis (died 1527), Swedish artist
- Anna Syberg (1870–1914), Danish painter
- Anna Szarmach (born 1978), Polish singer and teacher
- Anna Tanaka (born 2005), Japanese model and singer, member of South Korean group Meovv
- Anna Tariol-Baugé (1871–1944), French singer and actor
- Anna Tatangelo (born 1987), Italian pop singer
- Anna Heyward Taylor (1879–1956), American painter
- Anna Teichmüller (1861–1940), German composer
- Anna Ternheim (born 1978), Swedish singer-songwriter
- Anna Thalbach (born 1973), German actress
- Anna Dorothea Therbusch (1721–1782), German artist
- Anna Thibaud (1861–1948), French singer
- Anna Thomas, Welsh comedian
- Anna Thommesen (1908–2004), Danish textile artist and painter
- Anna-Lisa Thomson (1905–1952), Swedish painter and ceramicist
- Anna Thomson (born 1953), American actress
- Anna Thynn, Marchioness of Bath (1943–2022), Hungarian actress and British noblewoman by marriage
- Anna Tifu (born 1986), Italian classical violinist
- Anna Tivel, American singer-songwriter
- Anna Tomowa-Sintow (born 1941), Bulgarian soprano
- Anna Tonelli (c.1763–1846), Italian portrait painter in the late 17th century and early 18th century
- Anna Torma (born 1952), Hungarian-Canadian fibre artist
- Anna Torv (born 1979), Australian actress
- Anna S. Þorvaldsdóttir (born 1977), Icelandic composer
- Anna Townsend (1845–1923), American actress
- Anna Torge, German mandolinist, guitarist, and educator
- Anna Trebunskaya (born 1980), Russian-American dancer
- Anna Trincher (born 2001), Ukrainian singer and actress
- Anna Tsouhlarakis, Native American artist
- Anna Tsuchiya (born 1984), Japanese singer and actress
- Anna Tsybuleva (born 1990), Russian classical pianist
- Anna Tsygankova (born 1979), Russian ballet dancer
- Anna Turner (1942–1996), American radio and record producer
- Anna Tychsen (1853–1896), Danish ballet dancer
- Anna Udvardy (1949–2019), Hungarian film producer
- Anna Ukolova (born 1978), Russian theater and film actress
- Anna Umemiya (born 1972), Japanese television personality and model
- Anna Unterberger (born 1985), Italian actress
- Anna Katharina Valayil (born 1984), Indian musician
- Anna Valev, Swedish ballet dancer
- Anna Valle (born 1975), Italian actress
- Anna Van Hooft (born 1986), Canadian actress
- Anna Vinnitskaya (born 1983), Russian pianist
- Anna Visscher (1584–1651), Dutch artist, poet, and translator
- Anna Vissi (born 1957), Greek-Cypriot singer
- Anna Vogelzang (born 1985), American singer-songwriter
- Anna Volska (born 1944), Australian television actress
- Anna Voronova (born 2003), Ukrainian singer
- Anna Mae Walthall (1894–1950), American actress
- Anna Walinska (1906–1997), American painter
- Anna Walton (born 1980), English actress
- Anna Waronker (born 1972), American musician
- Anna Waser (1678–1714), Swiss artist
- Anna Webber (born 1984), Canadian jazz musician
- Anna Brita Wendelius (1741–1804), Swedish artist
- Anna Wheaton (1894–1961), American musical theatre actress and singer
- Anna Catharina Widerberg (1765–1824), Swedish actress and singer
- Anna Mae Wills (born 1982), Canadian actress
- Anna Wilson-Jones (born 1970), English actress
- Anna Mae Winburn (1913–1999), American vocalist and jazz bandleader
- Anna Lillian Winegar (1867–1941), American painter
- Anna Wing (1914–2013), English actress
- Anna Wise (born 1991), American singer
- Anna May Wong (1905–1961), American actress
- Anna Wong (1930–2013), Canadian artist, master printmaker, and educator
- Anna Wood (born 1985), American actress
- Anna Lomax Wood (born 1944), American ethnomusicologist
- Anna Woodward (1868–1935), American painter
- Anna Wyszkoni (born 1980), Polish musical artist
- Anna Yamada (born 2001), Japanese actress
- Anna Yamaki, Japanese voice actress and singer
- Anna Yesipova (1851–1914), Russian pianist
- Anna Zak (born 2001), Israeli singer
- Anna Zayachkivska (born 1991), Ukrainian model
- Anna Zemtsova (1893–1966), Soviet silent film actress and theorist
- Anna Zerr (1822–1881), German operatic soprano
- Anna Zharova, Russian ballet dancer
- Anna Ziaja (born 1954), Polish contemporary painter and printmaker
- Anna Zinkeisen (1901–1976), Scottish painter
- Anna Zlotovskaya (born 1967), Russian-Jewish-German violinist and performer

=== Journalism, authors, novelists, and writers ===
- Anna, Lady Miller (1741–1781), English poet and travel writer
- Anna Davidovna Abamelik-Lazareva (1814–1889), Russian-Armenian translator
- Anna Adams (poet) (1926–2011), English poet and artist
- Anna Aguilar-Amat (born 1962), Catalan poet
- Anna Åkerhielm (c. 1642–1698), Swedish writer, lady-in-waiting
- Anna Akhmatova (1889–1966), Russian poet
- Anna Aleeva-Stecker (1866–1936), Russian playwright
- Anna Alm (1862–1958), Swedish editor and author
- Anna Lisa Andersson (1873–1958), Swedish journalist and author
- Anna Angyal, Hungarian author
- Anna Anichkova (1868–1935), Russian writer and translator
- Anna Arutunyan, Russian-American journalist, analyst, and author
- Anna Astvatsaturian Turcotte (born 1978), Armenian-American writer, lecturer, philanthropist, and human rights advocate
- Anna Birgitta Axfors (born 1990), Swedish writer and poet
- Anna Bahriana (born 1981), Ukrainian writer and translator
- Anna Ballbona i Puig, Spanish journalist, writer, and literary critic
- Anna Balsamo, Italian poet
- Anna Banks, American author
- Anna Banti (1895–1985), Italian writer, art historian, and translator
- Anna Laetitia Barbauld (1743–1825), English author
- Anna Maynard Barbour (died 1941), American author
- Anna Barykova (1840–1893), Russian poet, satirist, and translator
- Anna von Bayern (born 1978), German journalist and writer
- Anna Beer (born 1964), British author and lecturer
- Anna Farquhar Bergengren (1865–1945), American writer, editor
- Anna Bijns (1493–1575), Flemish poet
- Anna Bikont (born 1954), Polish journalist and writer
- Anna Svanhildur Björnsdóttir (born 1948), Icelandic writer and educator
- Anna Blackwell (1816–1900), English writer
- Anna Blaman (1905–1960), Dutch writer and poet
- Anna Blazhenko (born 1955), Ukrainian journalist
- Anna Blundy (born 1970), English novelist and journalist
- Anna Bolavá (born 1981), Czech writer and poet
- Anna Bond (born 1984), chief creative officer and illustrator
- Anna Louisa Geertruida Bosboom-Toussaint (1812–1886), Dutch novelist
- Anna Botting (born 1967), British journalist and television presenter
- Anna Hempstead Branch (1875–1937), American poet
- Anna Branford, children's book author
- Anna Branting (1855–1950), Swedish journalist and writer
- Anna Brassey (1839–1887), British traveller and writer
- Anna Eliza Bray (1790–1883), English historical novelist and writer
- Anna Breitenbach, German author and performance artist
- Anna de Brémont (c. 1849–1922), American journalist
- Anna Brigadere (1861–1933), Latvian writer
- Anna Beecroft Briggs (1860s-1949), Canadian-born American playwright
- Anna Constantia von Brockdorff (1680–1765), German noblewoman
- Anna Robeson Brown (1873–1941), American writer
- Anna Bunina (1774–1829), Russian poet
- Anna Burns (born 1962), Irish writer
- Anna Cabana (born 1979), French journalist
- Anna Canzano, American broadcast journalist
- Anna Carey (died 1833), Irish writer, journalist, and musician
- Anna Theresa Cascio (born 1955), American screenwriter
- Anna Cataldi (1939–2021), Italian journalist, writer, and film producer
- Anna Chamber (died 1777), English noblewoman and poet
- Anna Alice Chapin (1880–1920), American author and playwright
- Anna Chatterton (born 1975), Canadian playwright
- Anna Ciddor (born 1957), Australian author and illustrator
- Anna Clarke (1919–2004), British mystery novelist
- Anna Colonna (1601–1658), Italian noblewoman
- Anna Coren (born 1975), Australian journalist and occasional news anchor
- Anna Couani (born 1948), Australian contemporary poet and educator
- Anna Crichton, New Zealand illustrator
- Anna Crowe (born 1945), British poet and translator
- Anna Dale (born 1971), English novelist
- Anna Daly (born 1977), Irish TV presenter
- Anna Dániel (1908–2003), Hungarian journalist
- Anna Daniels, Australian radio/TV presenter
- Anna David (born 1970), American journalist
- Anna Davlantes, American journalist and television news presenter
- Anna Dawbin (1816–1905), Australian diarist
- Anna Dean, British fiction writer
- Anna Del Conte (born 1925), Italian-born food writer
- Anna Dello Russo (born 1962), Italian fashion journalist
- Anna dePeyster (née Torv, formerly Murdoch and Mann; 1944–2026), British and Australian journalist and novelist
- Anna Dewdney (1965–2016), American author and illustrator
- Anna Peyre Dinnies (1805–1886), American writer
- Anna Dodas i Noguer (1962–1986), Catalan poet
- Anna Bowman Dodd (1858–1929), American writer
- Anna Dodsworth (c. 1740–1801), British romantic poet
- Anna Hanson Dorsey (1815–1896), American novelist
- Anna Harriett Drury (1824–1912), English novelist and poet
- Anna Edelheim (1845–1902), Finnish journalist
- Anna Ehrenström (1786–1857), Swedish poet
- Anna Ekielska-Skóra (born 1976), Polish flautist and social activist
- Anna Lenah Elgström (1884–1968), Swedish writer
- Anna Engelhardt (1838–1903), Russian writer, translator, editor, and philanthropist
- Anna Enquist (born 1945), Dutch poet and novelist
- Anna Ettlinger (1841–1934), German writer and poet
- Anna Farquhar (1865–1945), American author and editor
- Anna Felder (1937–2023), Swiss writer and playwright
- Anna Fienberg, Australian writer
- Anna Fifield (born 1976), New Zealand journalist
- Anna Fischer-Maraffa (c. 1802–1866), German operatic soprano
- Anna Fiske (born 1964), Swedish-born illustrator and writer
- Anna Fison (1839–1920), British translator, poet, and educator
- Anna M. Fitch (1840–1904), American writer
- Anna Ford (born 1943), British journalist and TV presenter
- Anna Forstenheim (1836–1889), Austrian writer and poet
- Anna Foster (journalist), British journalist
- Anna Frajlich, Polish-American writer
- Anna Franchi (1867–1954), Italian novelist, translator, playwright, and journalist
- Anna Friberger (born 1944), Swedish illustrator and set designer
- Anna Fricke, American television writer and producer
- Anna Fuller (1853–1916), American novelist and short story writer
- Anna Funder (born 1966), Australian author
- Anna Gavalda (born 1970), French novelist
- Anna Hamilton Geete (1848–1913), Swedish translator and writer
- Anna Genover-Mas, Catalan journalist and writer
- Anna Gien (born 1991), German writer and columnist
- Anna Gilligan, American journalist
- Anna Godbersen (born 1980), American writer
- Anna Golubkova (born 1973), Soviet writer, poet, and literary critic
- Anna Goos (1627–1691), Spanish printer
- Anna Katharine Green (1846–1935), American detective author
- Anna Gréki (1931–1966), Algerian poet
- Anna Grue (born 1957), Danish crime writer
- Anna Haava (1864–1957), Estonian poet
- Anna Katharina Hahn (born 1970), German author
- Anna Hakobyan (born 1978), Armenian journalist and Second Lady of Armenia
- Anna Marcet Haldeman (1887–1941), American dramatist
- Anna Gertrude Hall (1882–1967), American author and librarian
- Anna J. Hamilton (1860–?), American journalist
- Anna Sanborn Hamilton (1848–1927), co-founder, president, League of American Pen Women
- Anna Hammar-Rosén (1735–1805), Swedish newspaper editor
- Anna Hedenmo (born 1961), Swedish journalist and TV presenter
- Anna Höglund (born 1958), Swedish writer and illustrator
- Anna Rose Holmer, American director and writer
- Anna Holmes, American writer and editor
- Anna-Halya Horbach (1924–2011), Ukrainian translator and activist
- Anna Ovena Hoyer (1584–1655), German-Swedish writer and poet
- Anna Hume (1711–1776), Scottish translator, poet, and writer
- Anna Iwaszkiewicz (1897–1979), Polish writer and translator
- Anna Jackson (born 1967), New Zealand writer
- Anna Jacobs, English novelist
- Anna Brownell Jameson (1794–1860), Irish-born English writer
- Anna Janko (born 1957), Polish poet, writer, columnist, and literary critic
- Anna Jansson (born 1958), Swedish writer and nurse
- Anna Jókai (1932–2017), Hungarian author, poet, and teacher
- Anna Jones (born 1966), British news presenter
- Anna Jordan, English playwright
- Anna Journey (born 1980), American poet and essayist
- Anna Kaleri (born 1974), German writer and screenwriter
- Anna Kamieńska (1920–1986), Polish poet, writer, translator, and literary critic
- Anna Kańtoch (born 1976), Polish writer
- Anna Louisa Karsch (1722–1791), German poet
- Anna Kavan (1901–1968), British novelist, short story writer, and painter
- Anna Keiko, Chinese contemporary poet
- Anna Gordon Keown (1899–1957), English author and poet
- Anna Kessel, British sportswriter and journalist
- Anna Khachiyan (born 1985), American podcaster
- Anna Kim (born 1977), Austrian writer
- Anna Kooiman (born 1984), American television news reporter
- Anna-Reeta Korhonen (1809–1893), Finnish poet
- Anna Kostka (1575–1635), Polish-Lithuanian noblewoman
- Anna de Koven (1862–1953), American novelist
- Anna Kowalska (1903–1969), Polish writer and diarist
- Anna Krien, Australian journalist, essayist, fiction and nonfiction writer, and poet
- Anna Lacková-Zora (1899–1988), Slovak writer
- Anna Ladegaard (1913–2000), Danish writer
- Anna Larina (1914–1996), Russian writer
- Anna Larpent (1758–1832), British diarist
- Anna Laestadius Larsson (born 1966), Swedish author and journalist
- Anna Laszuk (1969–2012), Polish radio journalist and columnist
- Anna Lavrinenko, Russian writer
- Anna Letitia Le Breton (1808–1885), English author
- Anna Leader (born 1996), Luxembourg English-language poet and activist
- Anna Leahy (born 1965), American poet and nonfiction writer
- Anna Lindmarker (born 1961), Swedish journalist and news presenter
- Anna Linzer, American novelist
- Anna Livia (1955–2007), Irish-born lesbian writer, novelist, translator, and academic
- Anna Cabot Lowell (1811–1874), American writer
- Anna Christiane Ludvigsen (1794–1884), Danish poet
- Anna Lysyanskaya, American cryptographer
- Anna Mackenzie (born 1963), New Zealand writer
- Anna Mannheimer (born 1963), Swedish TV and radio presenter, journalist, and comedian
- Anna Margolin (1887–1952), American writer
- Anna Sujatha Mathai (died 2023), Indian poet
- Anna Meades, English novelist
- Anna Barbara van Meerten-Schilperoort (1778–1853), Dutch writer and editor
- Anna Mendelssohn (1948–2009), British writer, poet, and political activist
- Anna Metcalfe, British writer
- Anna Blake Mezquida (1883–1965), American writer, poet, and journalist
- Anna Minerva Henderson (1887–1987), Canadian teacher, civil servant, and poet
- Anna Minton (born 1970), British journalist and writer
- Anna Mitgutsch (born 1948), Austrian writer and educator
- Anna Monardo, American novelist
- Anna Mongait (born 1978), Russian journalist and TV presenter
- Anna Moschovakis, American poet, author, and translator
- Anna Cora Mowatt (1819–1870), French-born American author, playwright, and actress
- Anna Munch (1856–1922), Norwegian novelist and dramatist
- Anna Balmer Myers (1884–1972), American writer and teacher
- Anna Myszyńska (1931–2019), Silesian writer
- Anna Narinskaya (born 1966), Russian journalist and literary critic
- Anna Nemzer (born 1980), Russian journalist
- Anna Nieto-Gómez, American journalist
- Anna Nimiriano, South Sudanese journalist
- Anna de Noailles (1876–1933), Romanian-French writer
- Anna Nolan (born 1970), Irish television presenter and producer
- Anna North, American writer
- Anna Notaras (died 1507), Byzantine writer
- Anna Ogino (born 1956), Japanese author
- Anna Olcott Commelin (1841–1924), American poet
- Anna Olenina (1808–1888), Russian writer and singer
- Anna Olsson (1866–1946), Swedish-American author
- Anna Alojza Ostrogska (1600–1654), Polish-Lithuanian noblewoman
- Anna Ottendorfer (1815–1884), American journalist
- Anna-Karin Palm (born 1961), Swedish writer
- Anna Campbell Palmer (1854–1928), American author and editor
- Anna Palmer (born 1982), American journalist
- Anna Mehler Paperny, Canadian journalist and writer
- Anna Pasternak, British author
- Anna Pavignano (born 1955), Italian screenwriter
- Anna Pavord (born 1940), British writer
- Anna Perera, British writer
- Anna Hamilton Phelan, American screenwriter
- Anna Piaggi (1931–2012), Italian fashion writer
- Anna Luisa Pignatelli (born 1952), Italian novelist
- Anna Politkovskaya (1958–2006), American-Russian journalist and human rights activist
- Anna Ptaszynski (born 1986), British podcaster
- Anna Quindlen (born 1952), American author and journalist
- Anna Rabinowitz, American poet, librettist, and editor
- Anna Katarzyna Radziwiłłowa (1676–1746), Polish-Lithuanian noblewoman
- Anna Raeburn (born 1944), British journalist
- Anna Chapin Ray (1865–1945), American author
- Anna Řeháková (1850–1937), Czech teacher, translator, journalist, and suffragist
- Anna Reid (born 1965), English journalist and author
- Anna Reynolds (born 1968), British novelist, playwright, and screenwriter
- Anna Matlack Richards (1834–1900), American writer
- Anna Richardson (born 1970), English presenter, television producer, writer, and journalist
- Anna Steese Richardson (1865–1949), American writer and editor
- Anna S. Rickey (1827–1858), American poet
- Anna Ritter (1865–1921), German poet and writer
- Anna Rosmus (born 1960), German author and researcher in German history
- Anna Rozen, French writer
- Anna Rüling (1880–1953), German journalist
- Anna Russo, Italian writer
- Anna Rutgers van der Loeff (1910–1990), Dutch writer of children's novels
- Anna T. Sadlier (1854–1932), Canadian writer, translator
- Anna Sakse (1905–1981), Latvian writer and translator
- Anna Sandor, Hungarian-born Canadian/American film and television screenwriter
- Anna Zofia Sapieha (1799–1864), Polish noblewoman
- Anna Sarfatti (born 1950), Italian writer of children's books
- Anna Sauerbrey (born 1979), German journalist
- Anna Seghers (1900–1983), German writer
- Anna Sergejeva (born 1986), Ukrainian-Estonian actress
- Anna Seward (1742–1809), English Romantic poet
- Anna Sewell (1820–1878), English novelist
- Anna Moore Shaw (1898–1975), American writer
- Anna Shechtman (born 1990/1991), American journalist and crossword compiler
- Anna Sheehan (born 1979), American writer and novelist
- Anna Sissak-Bardizbanian (1876–1919), Swedish journalist
- Anna Smaill (born 1979), New Zealand poet and novelist
- Anna Soler-Pont, Spanish writer
- Anna Solomon, American novelist
- Anna Spargo-Ryan, Australian writer
- Anna Stanisławska (1651–1701), Polish author and poet
- Anna Starobinets (born 1978), Russian writer
- Anna Stothard, British novelist, journalist, and scriptwriter
- Anna Louise Strong (1885–1970), American writer
- Anna Strunsky (1877–1964), American novelist
- Anna Swanson, Canadian poet
- Anna Świrszczyńska (1909–1984), Polish poet
- Anna Tambour, Australian writer
- Anna Taylor (born 1982), New Zealand author
- Anna Thomas (born 1948), German-born American film screenwriter and film producer
- Anna Throndsen (1540–1607), Danish-Norwegian noblewoman
- Anna Eliot Ticknor (1823–1896), American writer
- Anna-Clara Tidholm (born 1946), Swedish children's writer and illustrator
- Anna Timiryova (1893–1975), Russian poet
- Anna Todd (born 1989), American author
- Anna Tyszkiewicz (1779–1867), Polish noblewoman
- Anna Vaccarella (born 1968), Venezuelan journalist
- Anna Jane Vardill (1781–1852), British poet
- Anna Lidia Vega Serova (born 1968), Cuban writer
- Anna M. M. Vetticad (born 1975), Indian author
- Anna Wahlenberg (1858–1933), Swedish writer and playwright
- Anna Wahlgren (1942–2022), Swedish writer
- Anna Frances Walker (1830–1913), Australian botanical illustrator
- Anna Lee Walters (born 1946), American novelist
- Anna Laetitia Waring (1823–1910), Welsh poet and hymn-writer
- Anna Bartlett Warner (1827–1915), American hymnwriter
- Anna Cabot Lowell Quincy Waterston (1812–1899), American writer
- Anna Weamys, English author
- Anna Wecker (died 1596), German nonfiction writer
- Anna Weidenholzer (born 1984), Austrian journalist and writer
- Anna Elisabet Weirauch (1887–1970), German author and lesbian activist
- Anna Wheeler (1780–1848), Irish-born British feminist writer
- Anna Wickham (1883–1947), English/Australian poet
- Anna Greta Wide (1920–1965), Swedish poet
- Anna Wiener (born 1987), American writer
- Anna Williams (1706–1783), Welsh poet and Samuel Johnson's companion
- Anna Williamson (born 1981), English television presenter
- Anna Winger, American novelist
- Anna Wintour (born 1949) British-American fashion journalist and editor-in-chief of the magazine Vogue
- Anna Woltz (born 1981), Dutch writer
- Anna Cogswell Wood (1850–1940), American novelist
- Anna Woolhouse (born 1984), British sports journalist and presenter
- Anna Yevreinova (1844–1917), Russian feminist writer, lawyer, and literary editor
- Anna Young Smith, American poet
- Anna Zahorska (1882–1942), Polish poet
- Anna Zay (1680–1733), Hungarian writer
- Anna Zemánková (1908–1986), Czech painter
- Anna Catharina Zenger (c. 1704–1752), American publisher
- Anna Sergeevna Zhukova, 18th century Russian writer and poet
- Anna Ziegler, American playwright
- Anna Zonová (born 1962), Czech writer
- Anna Radius Zuccari (1846–1918), Italian writer

=== Law and politics ===
- Anna Aalto (1920–1994), Finnish medical doctor and politician
- Anna Abdallah (born 1940), Tanzanian politician
- Anna Aeikens (born 1998), German politician
- Anna Aho Rink, American politician
- Anna Andrejuvová (born 1980), Slovak politician
- Anna Arganashvili, Georgian human rights lawyer
- Anna Kolbrún Árnadóttir (1970–2023), Icelandic politician
- Anna Arqué i Solsona (born 1972), Catalan politician
- Anna Ascani (born 1987), Italian politician
- Anna-Michelle Assimakopoulou (born 1967), Greek politician
- Anna Azari (born 1959), Israeli diplomat
- Anna Bansode, Indian politician
- Anna Barbarzak (born 1978), Polish diplomat
- Anna Lisa Baroni (born 1959), Italian politician
- Anna Kinberg Batra (born 1970), Swedish politician
- Anna Bauseneick (born 1991), German politician
- Anna Belousovová (born 1959), Slovak politician
- Anna Benaki-Psarouda (1934–2026), Greek politician
- Anna Bilotti (born 1982), Italian politician
- Anna Biolik, Canadian diplomat
- Anna Birulés (born 1954), Spanish politician and businesswoman
- Anna Sutherland Bissell (1846–1934), American businesswoman
- Anna Blackburne-Rigsby (born 1961), American judge
- Anna Bligh (born 1960), Australian politician
- Anna Blos (1866–1933), Swedish politician
- Anna Bodakova (born 2003), Bulgarian politician
- Anna Bogucka-Skowrońska (born 1942), Polish politician and lawyer
- Anna York Bondoc (born 1967), Filipino politician
- Anna Cinzia Bonfrisco (born 1962), Italian politician
- Anna Border (born 1952), American politician
- Anna Borucka-Cieślewicz (born 1941), Polish politician
- Anna Boschek (1874–1957), Austrian politician
- Anna Elizabeth Botha (1922–1997), First Lady of South Africa
- Anna Laura Braghetti (1953–2025), Italian political militant
- Anna Braithwaite (1788–1859), English Quaker minister
- Anna Bråkenhielm (born 1966), Swedish businessperson
- Anna Breman (born 1976), Swedish banker and economist
- Anna Teresa Brennan (1879–1962), Australian lawyer
- Anna Brown (born 1979), Australian lawyer and advocate
- Anna J. Brown (born 1952), American judge
- Anna Buckley (1924–2003), American politician
- Anna Bugge (1862–1928), Norwegian-Swedish feminist activist, lawyer, diplomat, and politician
- Anna Burke (born 1966), former Speaker of the Australian House of Representatives
- Anna Buthelezi (born 1965), South African politician and civil servant
- Anna Caballero (born 1955), American politician
- Anna Cavazzini (born 1982), German politician
- Anna Gabriella Ceccatelli (1927–2001), Italian politician
- Anna Chandy (1905–1996), Indian judge
- Anna Chernenko (1913–2010), First Lady of the Soviet Union
- Anna Chlebounová (1875–1946), Czech politician
- Anna Christmann (born 1983), German politician
- Anna Colas Pépin (1797–1872), Euro-African businesswoman
- Anna Colwell (1876–1941), American politician
- Anna Cowin, American politician
- Anna Crook (born 1934), American politician
- Anna Dange, Indian politician
- Anna Deparnay-Grunenberg (born 1976), German politician
- Anna Diamantopoulou (born 1959), Greek politician
- Anna Donáth (born 1987), Hungarian politician
- Anna Johnson Dupree (1891–1977), American businesswoman and philanthropist
- Anna Eastman, American politician
- Anna Ebaju Adeke (born 1991), Ugandan lawyer and politician
- Anna Ekström (born 1959), Swedish politician
- Anna Karin Eneström, Swedish diplomat
- Anna Erra (born 1965), Spanish politician
- Anna V. Eskamani (born 1990), American politician
- Anna Escobedo Cabral (born 1959), American politician
- Anna Eshoo (born 1942), American politician
- Anna Falkenberg (born 1996), Faroese politician
- Anna Christy Fall (1855–1930), American lawyer
- Anna Fang, Chinese investor
- Anna Maria Farias, American lawyer and government official
- Anna Mainardi Fava (1933–2003), Italian politician
- Anna Felice, Maltese judge
- Anna Finocchiaro (born 1955), Italian politician
- Anna Firth (1918–1961), British politician
- Anna Fotyga (born 1957), Polish politician
- Anna Gainey (born 1978), Canadian politician
- Anna-Maria Galojan (born 1982), Estonian politician, model and fugitive
- Anna Johnson Gates (1889–1939), American politician
- Anna Genovese (1905–1982), Italian-American businesswoman
- Anna Geyer (1893–1973), German politician and journalist
- Anna Barbara Gignoux (1725–1796), German businessperson
- Anna M. Gomez, American telecommunications lawyer
- Anna Górska (born 1980), Polish politician
- Anna Grigoryan (born 1991), Armenian politician
- Anna Grodzka (born 1954), Polish politician
- Anna Hagwall (born 1953), Swedish politician
- Anna Haight (1834–1898), First Lady of California
- Anna Hallberg (born 1963), Swedish politician
- Anna Hantz Marconi (born 1956), American judge
- Anna-Karin Hatt (born 1972), Swedish corporate leader and politician
- Anna Haverinen (1884–1959), Finnish politician
- Anna Healy, Baroness Healy of Primrose Hill (born 1955), British politician
- Anna Hedh (born 1967), Swedish politician
- Anna Aloys Henga, Tanzanian lawyer and activist
- Anna-Maja Henriksson (born 1964), Finnish politician
- Anna Sofie Herland (1913–1990), Norwegian politician
- Anna Hernandez, American politician
- Anna Herrmann (1892–c. 1980), German politician
- Anna Hubáčková (born 1957), Czech politician
- Anna Hübler (1876–1923), German politician
- Anna-Liisa Hyvönen (1926–2021), Finnish politician
- Anna Ibrisagic (born 1967), Swedish politician
- Anna Wilmarth Ickes (1873–1935), American politician and activist
- Anna-Kaisa Ikonen (born 1977), Finnish politician
- Anna Jardfelt, Swedish ambassador and permanent representative to the international organizations in Geneva
- Anna V. Jefferson (1926–2011), American politician
- Anna Johansson (born 1971), Swedish politician
- Anna Jones (born 1975), British businesswoman and entrepreneur
- Anna Joshi (1935–2014), Indian politician
- Anna Joubin-Bret (born 1962), French lawyer
- Anna Kahanamoku (1911–1969), American politician
- Anna Kaplan (born 1965), American politician
- Anna Karamanli (born 1968), Greek politician
- Anna Kassautzki (born 1993), German politician
- Anna-Liisa Kasurinen (born 1940), Finnish politician
- Anna Katzmann, Australian judge
- Anna Teresa Kavena (born 1986), German politician
- Anna Kelles (born 1974), American politician
- Anna Kéthly (1889–1976), Hungarian politician
- Anna Komorowska (born 1954), First Lady of Poland
- Anna Komu (born 1950), Tanzanian politician
- Anna König Jerlmyr (born 1978), Swedish politician
- Anna Kostanyan (born 1987), Armenian politician
- Anna Kovalenko (born 1991), Ukrainian politician, journalist and activist
- Anna Kramer (1694–1770), Russian court official
- Anna Grönlund Krantz, Swedish politician
- Anna M. Kross (1891–1979), Russian-American lawyer, judge, and public official
- Anna Krupka (born 1981), Polish politician
- Anna Kurska (1929–2016), Polish politician and lawyer
- Anna Kuznetsova (born 1982), Russian politician
- Anna Kwiecień (born 1964), Polish politician
- Anna Langford (1917–2008), American politician and lawyer
- Anna Lasses (born 1977), Swedish politician
- Anna Babaji Latthe (1878–1950), Indian politician
- Anna Leetsmann (1888–1942), Estonian communist politician
- Anna-Greta Leijon (1939–2024), Swedish politician
- Anna Lilliehöök, Swedish politician
- Anna Lindgren (1946–2015), Swedish politician
- Anna Lindh (1957–2003), Swedish politician
- Anna Lindhagen (1870–1941), Swedish politician, social reformer, and women's rights activist
- Anna Lindstedt (born 1960), Swedish diplomat
- Anna-Liisa Linkola (1914–1999), Finnish politician
- Anna Ljunggren (born 1984), Norwegian politician
- Anna Lo (1950–2024), Northern Irish politician
- Anna Lohe (1654–1731), Swedish banker
- Anna Lorck, New Zealand politician
- Anna Lührmann (born 1983), German politician
- Anna Paulina Luna (born 1989), American politician
- Anna MacKinnon (born 1957), American politician
- Anna Magyar, Hungarian politician
- Anna Majani (1936–2021), Italian entrepreneur
- Anna Malá (1886–1948), Czech politician
- Anna Rajam Malhotra (1927–2018), Indian administrative service officer
- Anna M. Manasco (born 1980), Alabama judge
- Anna Mancuso (born 1971), Canadian politician
- Anna Marcoulli (born 1974), Cypriot judge of the General Court
- Anna Mathew (1874–1948), Irish politician
- Anna McCurley (1943–2022), Scottish politician
- Anna McMorrin (born 1971), British politician
- Anna Milczanowska (born 1958), Polish politician
- Anna B. Miller, American politician
- Anna Carmela Minuto (born 1969), Italian politician
- Anna Brustad Moe (born 1975), Norwegian politician
- Anna Moeller (born 1945), American politician
- Anna Mokgethi, Motswana politician
- Anna Molberg (born 1990) Norwegian politician
- Anna Morton (1846–1918), Second Lady in the United States
- Anna Moskwa (born 1979), Polish minister of climate and environment
- Anna Mowbray (born 1983), New Zealand businessperson
- Anna Bitature Mugenyi, Ugandan lawyer and judge
- Anna Muhamedow (1900–1938), Soviet politician
- Anna Nghipondoka (born 1957), Namibian politician
- Anna Novak, American politician
- Anna Nyamekye (born 1954), Ghanaian politician
- Anna Belle Clement O'Brien (1923–2009), American politician
- Anna Dickie Olesen (1885–1971), American politician
- Anna Oreg (born 1985), Serbian politician
- Anna Laura Orrico (born 1980), Italian politician
- Anna Otke (born 1974), Russian politician
- Anna Pakuła-Sacharczuk (born 1956), Polish politician
- Anna Pauffley (born 1956), British judge
- Anna M. Peterson (born 1947), American politician
- Anna Pettersson (1861–1929), Swedish lawyer
- Anna Petteys (1892–1970), American politician
- Anna Pic (born 1978), French politician
- Anna Pieńkosz (born 1976), Polish diplomat
- Anna Zamora Puigceros (born 1957), Andorran politician
- Anna Radziwiłł (1939–2009), Polish politician
- Anna Rambabu, Indian politician
- Anna Rasehorn (born 1991), German politician
- Anna Ratkó (1903–1981), Hungarian politician
- Anna Moir Rennie (1899–1987), Australian politician
- Anna Reynolds, Australian politician
- Anna Richardson, Saint Maarten politician
- Anna Roberts (born 1957), Canadian politician
- Anna Rogstad (1854–1938), Norwegian politician
- Anna Kristine Jahr Røine (born 1949), Norwegian politician
- Anna Romanova (born 1985), Ukrainian politician
- Anna Rosbach (born 1947), Danish politician
- Anna Rosenberg (1899–1983), American public servant
- Anna Rossomando (born 1963), Italian politician
- Anna Rothery, former Lord Mayor of Liverpool
- Anna Rurka, former president of the INGOs conference
- Anna Sanna (born 1948), Italian politician
- Anna Santisteban (1914–2003), Puerto Rican businesswoman
- Anna Scharf, American politician
- Anna Schmidt-Rodziewicz (born 1978), Polish politician
- Anna Seile (1939–2019), Latvian politician
- Anna Senkoro (died 2017), Tanzanian politician
- Anna Shiweda (born 1958), Namibian politician
- Anna Siarkowska (born 1982), Polish politician
- Anna Sibinska (born 1963), Swedish politician
- Anna af Sillén (born 1976), Swedish politician
- Anna Simó (born 1968), Spanish politician
- Anna Simon (1862–1926), German trade unionist and politician
- Anna Sjödin (born 1976), Swedish politician
- Anna Sjöström-Bengtsson, Swedish politician
- Anna Skorokhod (born 1990), Ukrainian politician
- Anna Skroznikova (born 1995), Russian politician
- Anna Margaret Smedvig (born 1983), Norwegian businesswoman
- Anna Sobecka (born 1951), Polish politician
- Anna Sochańska, Polish politician
- Anna Sologashvili (1882–1937), Georgian politician
- Anna Song, American politician
- Anna Soubry (born 1956), British politician
- Anna Stang (1834–1901), Norwegian politician
- Anna Stavitskaya (born 1972), Russian lawyer
- Anna Stenberg (1867–1956), Swedish politician and suffragist
- Anna Sterky (1856–1939), Swedish politician and editor
- Anna Stiegler (1881–1963), German politician
- Anna Streżyńska (born 1967), Polish politician
- Anna Strohsahl (1885–1953), German politician
- Anna-Belle Strömberg, Swedish politician
- Anna Stürgkh (born 1994), Austrian politician
- Anna Tarwacka (born 1978), Polish lawyer
- Anna Diggs Taylor (1932–2017), American judge
- Anna Tenje (born 1977), Swedish politician
- Anna Terrana (born 1937), Canadian politician
- Anna Thistle, Canadian politician
- Anna Tibaijuka (born 1950), Tanzanian politician and United Nations official
- Anna-Liisa Tiekso (1929–2010), Finnish politician
- Anna Tovar, American politician
- Anna Turley (born 1978), British politician
- Anna Ulyanova (1864–1935), Russian-Soviet politician and stateswoman
- Anna M. Valencia (born 1985), city clerk of Chicago
- Anna Vardapetyan (born 1986), Armenian lawyer
- Anna Vedin (born 1966), Swedish politician
- Anna C. Verna (1931–2021), American politician
- Anna Vikström (born 1957), Swedish politician
- Anna Villaraza-Suarez (born 1980), Filipina politician
- Anna Vinayachandra (born 1948), Indian politician
- Anna de Waal (1906–1981), Dutch politician, Secretary of Education
- Anna Wallén, Swedish politician
- Anna Wallentheim (born 1985), Swedish politician
- Anna Wangenheim (born 1982), Greenlandic politician
- Anna Wasilewska (1958–2021), Polish politician
- Anna Watson, Australian politician
- Anna Wikland, Swedish business executive
- Anna Williams, American politician
- Anna Wills (born 1984), American politician
- Anna Wishart (born 1985), American politician
- Anna Lee Keys Worley (1872–1961), American politician
- Anna van Wyk (born 1942), South African politician
- Anna Záborská (1948–2025), Slovak politician
- Anna Zalewska (born 1965), Polish politician
- Anna Ziegler (1882–1942), German politician
- Anna Zielińska-Głębocka (born 1949), Polish politician
- Anna Maria Żukowska (born 1983), Polish politician and jurist

=== Sportspeople ===
- Anna Accensi (born 1970), Spanish rower
- Anna Afonasieva (born 2001), Russian chess player
- Anna Agrafioti (born 1991), Greek sport sailor
- Anna-Carin Ahlquist (born 1972), Swedish Paralympic table tennis player
- Anna Ahlstrand (born 1980), Swedish football midfielder
- Anna Akhsharumova (born 1957), Russian chess player
- Anna Lee Aldred (1921–2006), American jockey and trick rider
- Anna Aleksandrova (hurdler) (born 1929), Soviet athlete
- Anna Alliquander (born 1977), Hungarian rower
- Anna Alminova (born 1985), Russian middle-distance runner
- Anna Alyabyeva (born 1993), Kazakhstani rhythmic gymnast
- Anna Amholt (born 2000), Swedish ice hockey goaltender
- Anna Andersson (born 1982), Swedish ice hockey player
- Anna Andexer (born 2003), Austrian biathlete
- Anna Andreussi (born 1972), Italian rally co-driver
- Anna Andreyeva (1915–1997), Soviet shot putter
- Anna Angelova (born 1971), Bulgarian fencer
- Anna Rita Angotzi (born 1967), Italian sprinter
- Anna Antonova (born 1965), Soviet figure skater
- Anna Anvegård (born 1997), Swedish association football player
- Anna Archibald (born 1959), New Zealand alpine skier
- Anna Arkadianou (born 2001), Greek tennis player
- Anna Arkhipova (born 1973), Russian basketball player
- Anna Arnautova (born 2004), Ukrainian diver
- Anna Artamonova (born 1980), Russian volleyball player
- Anna Asheshov (born 1941), British alpine skier
- Anna Astapenko (born 1984), Russian football defender
- Anna-Lisa Augustsson (1924–2012), Swedish sprinter
- Anna Auvinen (born 1987), Finnish footballer
- Anna Avanzini (1917–2011), Italian gymnast
- Anna Avdeyeva (born 1985), Russian shot putter
- Anna Bacchiega (born 1957), Italian yacht racer
- Anna Badegruber (born 1997), Austrian cyclist
- Anna Bader (born 1983), German high diver
- Anna Bagdanovich (born 1983), Belarusian sprinter
- Anna Bagirova (born 1987), Ukrainian synchronized swimmer
- Anna Baranchuk (born 1993), Russian rugby sevens player
- Anna Baranova, Belarusian-Spanish rhythmic gymnastics coach
- Anna Barańska (born 1976), Polish mountaineer
- Anna Barbaro (born 1985), Italian Paralympic athlete
- Anna Bargman (born 2002), American ice hockey player
- Anna Basalkina (born 1974), Russian sailor
- Anna Bashta (born 1996), Russian-born Azerbaijani fencer
- Anna Basta (born 2001), Italian rhythmic gymnast
- Anna Bastrikova (born 1985), Russian tennis player
- Anna Batasova (born 2004), Russian rhythmic gymnast
- Anna Bates, Zimbabwean international lawn bowler
- Anna Battke (born 1985), German pole vaulter
- Anna Holm Baumeister (born 1987), Danish long-distance runner
- Anna Baylis (born 1976), Australian cross-country mountain biker
- Anna Beck (born 1979), Swedish para-cyclist
- Anna Behle (1876–1966), Swedish dancer and teacher of rhythmic gymnastics and solfège
- Anna Belomyttseva (born 1996), Russian association football player
- Anna Belousova (born 1996), Russian swimmer
- Anna Beneck (1942–2013), Italian swimmer
- Anna Bennett (born 1976), British field hockey player
- Anna Bentley (born 1981), British fencer
- Anna Berecz (born 1988), Hungarian alpine skier
- Anna Berg (born 1973), Swedish professional golfer
- Anna-Lisa Berglund (1935–2019), Swedish archer
- Anna Bernholm (born 1991), Swedish judoka
- Anna Berreiter (born 1999), German luger
- Anna Beskova (born 1986), Russian volleyball player
- Anna Bessonova (born 1984), Ukrainian rhythmic gymnast
- Anna Bia (born 2000), Brazilian footballer
- Anna Bieleń-Żarska (born 1979), Polish tennis player
- Anna Biryukova (born 1967), Russian athletics competitor
- Anna Bitieva (born 1987), Russian rhythmic gymnast
- Anna Björk Kristjánsdóttir (born 1989), Icelandic footballer
- Anna Bjørke Kallestad (born 1996), Norwegian handball player
- Anna Blässe (born 1987), German footballer
- Anna Blinkova (born 1998), Russian tennis player
- Anna Blom (born 1976), Swedish female curler
- Anna Blyth (born 1988), English cyclist
- Anna Boada (born 1992), Spanish rower
- Anna Bocson (born 1936), Australian javelin thrower
- Anna Bogaliy-Titovets (born 1979), Russian biathlete
- Anna Bogdanova (born 1984), Russian heptathlete
- Anna Bogomazova (born 1990), Russian kickboxer, martial artist, professional wrestler and valet
- Anna Bogren (born 1965), Swedish orienteering competitor
- Anna Bondár (born 1997), Hungarian tennis player
- Anna Bongiorni (born 1993), Italian sprinter
- Anna Borgqvist (born 1992), Swedish ice hockey player and coach
- Anna Bornhoff (born 1981), German football striker
- Anna Bozsik (born 1965), Hungarian biathlete
- Anna Braunová, Czechoslovak table tennis player
- Anna Brazhnikova (born 1991), Swedish tennis player
- Anna van der Breggen (born 1990), Dutch racing cyclist
- Anna van Brummen (born 1994), American fencer
- Anna Buhigas (born 1994), American association football player
- Anna Bukis (born 1953), Polish athletics competitor
- Anna Bulanova (born 1994), Kyrgyzstani sprinter and long jumper
- Anna Bulgakova (born 1988), Russian hammer thrower
- Anna Burnet (born 1992), British Olympic sailor
- Anna Burtasova (born 1987), Russian-Canadian chess player
- Anna Callebaut (born 1962), Belgian cyclist
- Anna Camp-Bennett (born 1998), American middle-distance runner
- Anna Maria Cantù (1923–2008), Italian sprinter
- Anna Caplice (born 1989), rugby player
- Anna Cappellini (born 1987), Italian ice dancer
- Anna Casagrande (born 1958), Italian equestrian
- Anna Chakvetadze (born 1987), Russian tennis player
- Anna Cheong (born 1998), Malaysian badminton player
- Anna Chepeleva (born 1984), Russian artistic gymnast
- Anna Chernova (born 1992), Russian speed skater
- Anna Chernysheva (born 2001), Russian karateka
- Anna Chicherova (born 1982), Russian high jumper
- Anna Cholovyaga (born 1992), Russian footballer
- Anna Christian (born 1995), Manx cyclist
- Anna Grace Christiansen (born 1985), American cyclist
- Anna Chuk (born 1983), Bulgarian rower
- Anna Cleaver, New Zealand triathlete
- Anna Clemente (born 1994), Italian race walker
- Anna Cockrell (born 1997), American track and field athlete
- Anna Cohí (born 1988), Spanish Paralympic alpine skier
- Anna Comarella (born 1997), Italian cross-country skier
- Anna Conesa (born 2003), French footballer
- Anna Corderoy (born 1994), British rowing coxswain
- Anna Costalunga (born 1970), Italian basketball player
- Anna Cramling (born 2002), Swedish chess player
- Anna Cristino (born 2001), Italian fencer
- Anna Croci (born 1972), Italian ice dancer
- Anna Crowley (born 2000), New Zealand field hockey player
- Anna Cruz (born 1986), Spanish basketball player
- Anna Csiki (born 1999), Hungarian footballer
- Anna Czerwińska (1949–2023), Polish mountaineer
- Anna Dacyshyn, Canadian diver
- Anna Dallakyan (born 2001), Armenian footballer
- Anna Danesi (born 1996), Italian volleyball player
- Anna Danilina (born 1995), Kazakhstani tennis player
- Anna Davis (born 2006), American amateur golfer
- Anna De la Forest (born 1988), Italian ice hockey player
- Anna DeForge (born 1976), American-Montenegrin basketball player
- Anna Dementyeva (born 1994), Russian artistic gymnast
- Anna Dessoye (born 1994), American field hockey player
- Anna Docherty (born 2000), British cyclist
- Anna Dodd (born 1980), New Zealand cricketer
- Anna Dogonadze (born 1973), German trampoline gymnast
- Anna Doi (born 1995), Japanese sprinter
- Anna Doig (born 1965), New Zealand swimmer
- Anna Domeij (born 1987), Swedish curler
- Anna Dorofeeva (born 1979), Russian chess player
- Anna Dovgopoliuk (born 1985), Ukrainian volleyball player
- Anna Dowgiert (born 1990), Polish swimmer
- Anna Dreimane (born 1997), Latvian basketball player
- Anna Dulce (born 2005), Moldovan sport shooter
- Anna Duò (born 1972), Italian footballer
- Anna Dušková (born 1999), Czech figure skater
- Anna Dyvik (born 1994), Swedish cross-country skier
- Anna Džurňáková (born 1983), Slovak ice hockey player
- Anna Eames (born 1990), American Paralympic swimmer
- Anna Efimenko (born 1980), Russian Paralympic swimmer
- Anna Egorova (born 1998), Russian swimmer
- Anna Elendt (born 2001), German swimmer
- Anna Eltisheva (born 2000), Uzbekistani synchronized swimmer
- Anna-Karin Eriksson (born 1967), Swedish swimmer
- Anna-Lisa Eriksson (1928–2012), Swedish cross-country skier
- Anna Evseeva (born 1988), Russian cyclist
- Anna Fairman (born 2000), American ice hockey player
- Anna Farhi (born 1980), Israeli volleyball player
- Anna Fedulova (born 1978), Russian cross-country skier
- Anna Fehér (1921–1999), Hungarian gymnast
- Anna Feore (born 1996), Canadian female volleyball player
- Anna Fernstädt (born 1996), Czech-German skeleton racer
- Anna Figura (born 1990), Polish ski mountaineer
- Anna Filbey (born 1999), Wales international footballer
- Anna Fitídou (born 1977), Cypriot pole vaulter
- Anna Fitzpatrick (born 1989), British tennis player
- Anna Flanagan (born 1992), Australian field hockey player
- Anna Floris (born 1982), Italian tennis player
- Anna Földényi (born 1974), Hungarian tennis player
- Anna Forder (born 1951), Canadian pair skater
- Anna Fowler (born 1991), English curler
- Anna Fraser (born 1963), Canadian freestyle skier
- Anna Frithioff (born 1962), Swedish cross-country skier
- Anna Frolina (born 1984), South Korean biathlete
- Anna Frolova (born 2005), Russian figure skater
- Anna Frost (born 1981), New Zealand runner
- Anna Galmarini (1942–1997), Italian figure skater
- Anna Galvan (born 1978), New Zealand netball player
- Anna Gandler (born 2001), Austrian biathlete
- Anna Gasper (born 1997), German association footballer
- Anna Gasser (born 1991), Austrian snowboarder
- Anna Gavrilenko (born 1990), Russian rhythmic gymnast
- Anna Gavriushenko (born 1982), Kazakhstani sprinter
- Anna Gawrońska (born 1979), Polish footballer
- Anna Geary (born 1987), Irish camogie player
- Anna Gębala-Duraj (born 1949), Polish cross-country skier
- Anna Gerasimou (born 1987), Greek tennis player
- Anna Gerhardt (born 1998), German footballer
- Anna Gershnik (born 1975), American chess player
- Anna Gibson (born 1999), American ski mountaineer
- Anna Giordano Bruno (born 1980), Italian pole vaulter
- Anna Glazkova (born 1981), Belarusian rhythmic gymnast
- Anna Glennon (born 1996), American professional watercraft racer
- Anna Godoy (born 1992), Spanish triathlete
- Anna Gomez (born 1986), Spanish basketball player
- Anna Gomis (born 1973), French wrestler
- Anna Gönczi (born 1959), Hungarian sport shooter
- Anna Goodale (born 1983), American rower
- Anna Goodman (born 1986), Canadian alpine skier
- Anna Kristīne Gornela (born 1997), American footballer
- Anna Górnicka-Antonowicz (born 1968), Polish orienteering competitor
- Anna Gostomelsky (born 1981), Israeli swimmer
- Anna Goulding (born 1992), New Zealand ice hockey defender
- Anna Green (born 1990), New Zealand footballer
- Anna Grejman (born 1993), Polish volleyball player
- Anna Grimaldi (born 1997), New Zealand Paralympic athlete
- Anna Grineva (born 1988), Russian water polo player
- Anna Grudko (born 1990), Russian artistic gymnast
- Anna Grzesiak (born 1987), Polish triathlete
- Anna Gual (born 1996), Spanish water polo player
- Anna Úrsúla Guðmundsdóttir (born 1985), Icelandic handball player
- Anna Gurbanova (born 1986), Azerbaijani rhythmic gymnast
- Anna Gurova (born 1981), Russian sprinter
- Anna Guseva (born 1987), Russian swimmer
- Anna Gushchina (born 1997), Russian judoka
- Anna Gutu (1990/1991–2023), American mountaineer
- Anna Guzowska (born 1980), Polish sprinter
- Anna Gyarmati, Hungarian snowboarder
- Anna Jönsson Haag (born 1986), Swedish cross-country skier
- Anna Haak (born 1996), Swedish volleyball player
- Anna Häfele (born 1989), German ski jumper
- Anna Hagemann (1919–2008), German discus thrower
- Anna Sofia Ulrika Hagman (born 1997), Swedish professional footballer
- Anna Hahn (born 1976), American chess player
- Anna Hahner (born 1989), German athlete
- Anna Hairapetian (born 1989), Armenian chess player
- Anna Hall (born 2001), American athlete
- Anna Hall (born 1979), Swedish footballer
- Anna Hall (born 1999), American volleyball player
- Anna Hämäläinen (born 1994), Finnish sprinter
- Anna Handzlová (1946–2020), Czech orienteering competitor
- Anna Sunadóttir Hansen (born 1998), Faroese footballer
- Anna Harkowska (born 1980), Polish Paralympic cyclist
- Anna von Harnier (born 1981), German judoka
- Anna McCune Harper (1902–1999), American tennis player
- Anna Harrington, American archer
- Anna Harris (born 1998), English cricket umpire and cricketer
- Anna Harrison (born 1983), New Zealand netball international
- Anna Hasselborg (born 1989), Swedish curler
- Anna Hawkins (born 1984), English tennis player
- Anna Healey (born 1995), English/German cricketer
- Anna-Karin Heijdenberg (born 2000), Swedish biathlete
- Anna Heilferty (born 1999), American soccer player
- Anna Hellman (born 1978), Swedish snowboarder
- Anna Hemmings (born 1976), British kayakist
- Anna Henderson (cyclist) (born 1998), British cyclist
- Anna Hermansson (born 1989), Swedish biathlete
- Anna Hertel (born 2000), Polish tennis player
- Anna Hilton (born 1963), Swedish equestrian
- Anna Hjälmkvist (born 1993), Swedish footballer
- Anna Hofer (born 1988), Italian alpine skier
- Anna Holmlund (born 1987), Swedish freestyle skier
- Anna Hontar, Ukrainian Paralympic swimmer
- Anna Hopkin (born 1996), English swimmer
- Anna Hradská (born 1959), Slovak handball player
- Anna Huang (born 2008), Canadian professional golfer
- Anna Hübler (1885–1976), German pair skater
- Anna Hursey (born 2006), Welsh table tennis player
- Anna May Hutchison (1925–1998), baseball player
- Anna Ilina (born 1997), Ukrainian sport shooter
- Anna Iljuštšenko (born 1985), Estonian high jumper
- Anna Illés (born 1994), Hungarian water polo player
- Anna Incerti (born 1980), Italian long-distance runner
- Anna Ivan (born 1966), American tennis player
- Anna Ivanova, multiple people
- Anna Jagaciak-Michalska (born 1990), Polish long and triple jumper
- Anna Jakubczak (born 1973), Polish middle-distance runner
- Anna Jakubowska (born 1988), Polish chess player
- Anna Janoušková (born 1965), Czech cross-country skier
- Anna Jay (born 1998), American professional wrestler
- Anna Jelmini (born 1990), American athlete
- Anna Jesień (born 1978), Polish hurdler
- Anna Jochemsen (born 1985), Dutch Paralympic skier
- Anna Lotta Jõgeva (born 1999), Estonian alpine skier
- Anna Johannes (born 1993), American Paralympic swimmer
- Anna Johansson (born 1994), Swedish ice hockey
- Anna-Carin Jonasson (born 1971), Swedish professional golfer
- Anna Jordaens (1927–1996), Belgian gymnast
- Anna Jøsendal (born 2001), Norwegian football player
- Anna Junczyk-Paczuska (born 1980), Polish archer
- Anna Jurčenková (born 1985), Slovak basketball player
- Anna Jurczyńska (1926–2009), Polish chess player
- Anna Jurkiewicz (born 1984), Polish figure skater
- Anna Kaaleste (1930–2014), Soviet cross-country skier
- Anna Kael (1908–1985), Hungarian sportswoman
- Anna Kaiser, American personal trainer
- Anna Kalashnikova (born 1972), Ukrainian volleyball player
- Anna Kalashnyk (born 1992), Ukrainian artistic gymnast
- Anna Kalinskaya (born 1998), Russian tennis player
- Anna Bjørke Kallestad (born 1996), Norwegian handball player
- Anna Kalmykova (born 2008), Russian artistic gymnast
- Anna Kamińska (born 1983), Polish mountain bike orienteer
- Anna-Karin Kammerling (born 1980), Swedish swimmer
- Anna van der Kamp (born 1972), Canadian rower
- Anna Kaniuk (born 1984), Belarusian Paralympic athlete
- Anna Kantane (born 1995), Polish chess player
- Anna Karapetyan (born 1990), Armenian footballer
- Anna Karlsson (born 1975), Swedish sprint canoer
- Anna Karnaukh (born 1993), Russian water polo player
- Anna Karpushina (born 1982), Russian wheelchair curler
- Anna Kasprzak (born 1989), Danish dressage rider
- Anna Kavatha (born 1987), Greek volleyball player
- Anna Kawamura (born 1991), Japanese handball player
- Anna Kay (born 1999), British cyclist
- Anna Kazantseva (born 1972), Russian archer
- Anna Kellnerová (born 1996), Czech equestrian
- Anna Kharitonova (born 1985), Russian Olympic judoka
- Anna Khnychenkova (born 1994), Ukrainian figure skater
- Anna Khvorikova (born 1997), Russian windsurfer
- Anna Kiełbasińska (born 1990), Polish athlete
- Anna Kiesenhofer (born 1991), Austrian cyclist
- Anna Kilponen (born 1995), Finnish ice hockey player
- Anna Kimberley (born 1995), English squash player
- Anna Kimbrell (born 1990), American baseball player
- Anna Kindy (born 1962), Canadian freestyle skier
- Anna Kistanova (born 1990), Kazakhstani biathlete
- Anna Kjellbin (born 1994), Swedish ice hockey player
- Anna Klasen (born 1993), German tennis player
- Anna Klim (born 1975), Australian tennis player
- Anna Klink (born 1995), German association football player
- Anna Klüpfel (1903–?), Swiss fencer
- Anna Knauer (born 1995), German cyclist
- Anna Knoroz (born 1970), Russian hurdler
- Anna Kobceva (born 1986), Ukrainian badminton player
- Anna Koblencová (born 1997), Czech slalom canoeist
- Anna Kochetova (born 1987), Russian handball player
- Anna Kochukova (born 2001), Russian chess player
- Anna Köhler (born 1993), German bobsledder
- Anna Kolářová (swimmer) (born 1997), Czech swimmer
- Anna Kolářová (born 1998), Czech field hockey player
- Anna Konanykhina (born 2004), Russian diver
- Anna Kondrachina (born 1955), Soviet rower
- Anna Konishi (born 1996), Japanese swimmer
- Anna Konkina (born 1947), Russian cyclist
- Anna-Christina Kopinits (born 1985), Austrian chess player
- Anna Korabiec (born 1995), Polish volleyball player
- Anna Korakaki (born 1996), Greek shooter
- Anna Kornuta (born 1988), Ukrainian long jumper
- Anna Korshikova (born 1982), Kyrgyzstani swimmer
- Anna Korzeniak (born 1988), Polish tennis player
- Anna Kosnyreva (born 1986), Russian volleyball player
- Anna Kotchneva (born 1970), Soviet rhythmic gymnast
- Anna Kotikova (born 1999), Russian volleyball player
- Anna Kotočová (born 1968), Slovak basketball player
- Anna Koumantou (born 1982), Greek tennis player
- Anna Kournikova (born 1981), Russian tennis player
- Anna Kovács (born 1991), Hungarian handball player
- Anna Kovaleva (born 1983), Russian artistic gymnast
- Anna Kozak (born 1974), Belarusian sprinter
- Anna Kozhnikova (born 1987), Russian football defender
- Anna Kozlova (born 1972), Russian/American synchronized swimmer
- Anna Kozyupa (born 1995), Belarusian footballer
- Anna Krasteva (born 1977), Bulgaria speed skater
- Anna Kraus (born 1980), American soccer player
- Anna Kristensen (born 2000), Danish handball player
- Anna Björk Kristjánsdóttir (born 1989), Icelandic footballer
- Anna-Carina Kristler (born 1988), Austrian footballer
- Anna Krivshina (born 1996), Russian Paralympic swimmer
- Anna Krūmiņa (born 1999), Latvian footballer
- Anna Krylova (born 1985), Russian triple jumper
- Anna Kryvonos (born 1997), Ukrainian biathlete
- Anna Krzemińska-Karbowiak (born 1950), Polish rower
- Anna Krzeptowska-Żebracka (1938–2017), Polish cross-country skier
- Anna Ksok (born 1983), Polish high jumper
- Anna Kubešková (born 1989), Czech curler
- Anna Kubicka (born 1999), Polish chess player
- Anna Kublikova (born 1998), Belarusian figure skater
- Anna Kuczera (born 1994), Polish judoka
- Anna Kulinich-Sorokina (born 1992), Russian Paralympic athlete
- Anna Kulíšková (born 1986), Czech para-alpine skier
- Anna Kuzmenko (born 2004), Russian-born figure skater
- Anna Kwitniewska (born 1979), Polish rhythmic gymnast
- Anna Lagerquist (born 1993), Swedish handball player
- Anna Lanning (born 1994), Australian cricketer
- Anna Lao (born 1962), Australian badminton player
- Anna Lapushchenkova (born 1986), Russian tennis player
- Anna Larie, Romanian canoeist
- Anna Larionova (born 1975), Russian alpine skier
- Anna Larsson (1922–2003), Swedish middle-distance runner
- Anna Lashchevska (born 2007), Ukrainian artistic gymnast
- Anna Lawrence (born 1972), New Zealand field hockey player
- Anna Lazareva (born 1997), Russian volleyball player
- Anna Leat (born 2001), New Zealand footballer
- Anna Lebedeva (born 1981), Kazakhstani biathlete
- Anna Łęcka (born 1980), Polish archer
- Anna Leszczyńska-Łazor (born 1971), Polish athlete
- Anna Levandi (born 1965), Russian former competitive figure skater
- Anna Levkovets (born 2007), Kazakhstani figure skater
- Anna Lewandowska (born 1988), Polish karateka
- Anna Li (born 1988), American artistic gymnast
- Anna Limbach (born 1989), German fencer
- Anna Lindberg (born 1981), Swedish diver
- Anna-Kari Lindholm (born 1976), Swedish curler
- Anna Lindström (born 1982), Finnish cyclist
- Anna Linkova (born 1977), Russian tennis player
- Anna Litvinenko (born 2001), British figure skater
- Anna Loerper (born 1984), German handball player
- Anna Lucz (born 1999), Hungarian canoeist
- Anna Łukasiak, Polish freestyle wrestler
- Anna Łukasik (born 1987) Polish dressage rider
- Anna Lundström (born 1980), Swedish figure skater
- Anna Lunyova (born 1991), Ukrainian long jumper
- Anna Luxová (born 1997), Czech Paralympic athlete
- Anna Lynch, Australian snooker and billiards player
- Anna Lysenko (born 1991), Ukrainian boxer
- Anna Thea Madsen (born 1994), Danish badminton player
- Anna Magnusson (born 1995), Swedish biathlete
- Anna Magnusson (born 1995), Swedish professional golfer
- Anna Mahon (born 1974), American hammer thrower
- Anna Maiques (born 1967), Spanish field hockey player
- Anna Maiwald (born 1990), German heptathlete
- Anna Mąka (luger) (born 1948), Polish luger
- Anna Mąka (born 1992), Polish biathlete
- Anna Makarova (born 1984), Russian volleyball player
- Anna Maksymenko (born 2007), Ukrainian fencer
- Anna Makurat (born 2000), Polish basketball player
- Anna Maliszewska (born 1993), Polish modern pentathlete
- Anna Malukhina (born 1958), Russian sport shooter
- Anna Manaut (born 1990), Spanish handball player
- Anna Marejková (born 1933), Slovak gymnast
- Anna Marek (born 1989), American equestrian
- Anna Arina Marenko (born 1992), Russian tennis player
- Anna Marešová (born 1946), Czech rower
- Anna Markovych, Ukrainian tennis player and coach
- Anna Chiara Mascolo (born 2001), Italian swimmer
- Anna Mastyanina (born 1987), Russian sport shooter
- Anna Matiyenko (born 1981), Russian volleyball player
- Anna Matthes (born 1998), German modern pentathlete
- Anna Maycock, Australian volleyball player
- Anna Mayevskaya, Soviet luger
- Anna Mazhirina (born 1983), Russian pool, snooker and billiards player
- Anna McNuff (born 1984), British rower
- Anna McVann (born 1968), Australian swimmer
- Anna Meares (born 1983), Australian cyclist
- Anna Medvedeva (born 1989), Russian cross-country skier
- Anna Mega (born 1962), Italian footballer
- Anna Mei (born 1967), Italian cyclist
- Anna Meixner (born 1994), Austrian ice hockey forward
- Anna Vania Mello (born 1979), Italian volleyball player
- Anna Melnikova (born 1995), Russian volleyball player
- Anna Memija (born 2004), American-Albanian footballer
- Anna Menconi (born 1971), Italian Paralympic archer
- Anna Meyer (born 1928), American baseball player
- Anna Meysak (born 1984), Belarusian gymnast
- Anna Mickelson (born 1980), American rower
- Anna Mifková (born 1943), Czech volleyball player
- Anna Milanova (born 1978), Bulgarian volleyball player
- Anna Milenina (born 1986), Russian Paralympic biathlete
- Anna Millward (born 1971), Australian cyclist
- Anna Mirgorodskaya (born 1980), Ukrainian artistic gymnast
- Anna Miros (born 1985), Polish volleyball player
- Anna Mirtova (born 1992), Russian freestyle skier
- Anna Mishchenko (born 1983), Ukrainian middle-distance runner
- Anna Mohrová (born 1944), Czech alpine skier
- Anna Mollenhauer (born 1999), Canadian field hockey player
- Anna Emilie Møller (born 1997), Danish athlete
- Anna Monz (born 1989), German handball player
- Anna Moorhouse (born 1995), English footballer
- Anna-Liza Mopio-Jane (born 1986), Papua New Guinean swimmer
- Anna Morgina (born 1991), Russian tennis player
- Anna Morris, Welsh cyclist
- Anna Mosenkova (born 1973), Estonian ice dancer
- Anna Mozhar (born 1974), Kazakhstani archer
- Anna Mrozińska (born 1985), Polish rhythmic gymnast
- Anna Munroe (born 2001), Canadian curler
- Anna Muzychuk (born 1990), Ukrainian chess grandmaster
- Anna Myzdrikova (born 1992), Russian artistic gymnast
- Anna Nagornyuk (born 1996), Russian ice dancer
- Anna Nahirna (born 1988), Ukrainian cyclist
- Anna Narel (born 1989), Polish badminton player
- Anna Laurell Nash (born 1980), Swedish boxer
- Anna Nasilyan (born 1980), Armenian middle-distance runner
- Anna Nazarov (born 1984), American frisbee player
- Anna Nazarova (born 1986), Russian long jumper
- Anna Ndege (born 1982), Tanzanian middle-distance runner
- Anna Nechaevskaya (born 1991), Russian cross-country skier
- Anna Negulic (born 1998), Canadian sprint kayaker
- Anna Nemetz-Schauberger (born 1944), Romanian handball player
- Anna Neshcheret (born 1981), Ukrainian figure skater
- Anna Nicholls (born 1997), English cricketer
- Anna Nielsen (born 1998), Danish sport shooter
- Anna Nikitina, Kazakhstani handball player
- Anna Nilsson Simkovics (born 1993), Austrian orienteering competitor
- Anna Nordqvist (born 1987), Swedish golfer
- Anna Normann (born 1984), Swedish sport shooter
- Anna Nosova (born 2001), Ukrainian synchronized swimmer
- Anna Ntenta, Greek boccia player
- Anna Ntountounaki (born 1995), Greek swimmer
- Anna Nurmukhambetova (born 1993), Kazakhstani weightlifter
- Anna Nyíri (born 1981), Hungarian swimmer
- Anna Mae O'Dowd (1929–2018), American baseball player
- Anna-Lisa Ohlsson (1925–2015), Swedish canoeist
- Anna Ohmiya (born 1989), Japanese curler
- Anna Olasz (born 1993), Hungarian swimmer
- Anna Olkhovyk (born 1987), Ukrainian basketball player
- Anna Olofsson (born 1981), Swedish snowboarder
- Anna-Karin Olsson (born 1967), Swedish tennis and bandy player
- Anna Olsson (born 1964), Swedish canoeist
- Anna Olsson (born 1976), Swedish cross-country skier
- Anna Omarova (born 1981), Russian shot putter
- Anna Omielan (born 1993), Polish Paralympic swimmer
- Anna Orlik (born 1993), Belarusian tennis player
- Anna Orlova (born 1972), Latvian luger
- Anna Oskarsson (born 1996), Swedish footballer
- Anna Ottosson (born 1976), Swedish alpine skier
- Anna Ovcharova (born 1996), Russian figure skater
- Anna Oxenstierna (born 1963), Swedish golfer
- Anna Ozolins (born 1974), Australian rower
- Anna Paijinda (born 1974), Thai volleyball player
- Anna Erika Pakkala (born 1995), Finnish artistic gymnast
- Anna Pardo (born 1983), Spanish water polo player
- Anna Pasiarová (born 1949), Slovak cross-country skier
- Anna Pasokha (born 1949), Russian rower
- Anna Clarice Patrimonio (born 1993), Filipino tennis player
- Anna Patten (born 1999), English footballer
- Anna Paulson (born 1984), Swedish footballer
- Anna Pavlova (born 1987), Russian-born artistic gymnast
- Anna Pawlusiak (born 1952), Polish cross-country skier
- Anna Payr (born 1981), Hungarian sailor
- Anna Pellissier (1927–2017), Italian alpine skier
- Anna Pendergast (born 1961), Canadian basketball player
- Anna-Karin Persson (born 1973), Swedish swimmer
- Anna Peterson (born 1990), New Zealand cricketer
- Anna Petrakova (born 1984), Russian basketball player
- Anna Petryk (born 1997) Ukrainian footballer
- Anna Rakel Pétursdóttir (born 1998), Icelandic footballer
- Anna Pezzetta (born 2007), Italian figure skater
- Anna Pfeffer (born 1945), Hungarian canoeist
- Anna Pichrtová (born 1973), Czech long-distance runner
- Anna Piergentili (born 2009), Italian rhythmic gymnast
- Anna Pilipenko (born 1988), Belarusian footballer
- Anna Plichta (born 1992), Polish cyclist
- Anna Poddubskaia (born 1985), Russian para taekwondo practitioner
- Anna Podkopaeva (born 1990), Russian volleyball player
- Anna Pogorilaya (born 1998), Russian retired figure skater
- Anna Pohjanen (born 1974), Swedish footballer
- Anna Pohlak (born 1993), Estonian sport sailor
- Anna Pohludková (born 1959), Czech gymnast
- Anna Polak (1906–1943), Dutch Jewish gymnast
- Anna-Liisa Põld (born 1990), Estonian swimmer
- Anna Polinari (born 1999), Italian sprinter
- Anna Polivanchuk (born 1990), Swedish deaf swimmer
- Anna Pollatou (1983–2014), Greek rhythmic gymnast
- Anna Ponomaryova (1920–2009), Soviet fencer
- Anna Potokina (born 1987), Russian cyclist
- Anna Power (born 1984), British equestrian sportswoman
- Anna Prins (born 1991), American basketball player
- Anna Propošina (born 1990), Latvian footballer
- Anna Prugova (born 1993), Russian ice hockey goaltender
- Anna Prysazhnuka (born 1990), Latvian cue sports player
- Anna Psatha (born 1975), Greek handball player
- Anna Pujol (born 1990), Spanish cyclist
- Anna Puławska (born 1996), Polish canoeist
- Anna Punko (born 1989), Russian handball player
- Anna Purchase (born 1999), British athlete
- Anna Pyatykh (born 1981), Russian triple jumper
- Anna Ramírez, multiple people
- Anna-Kaisa Rantanen (born 1978), Finnish footballer
- Anna Raynor (born 1985), American javelin thrower
- Anna Rechnio (born 1977), Polish figure skater
- Anna Redka (born 1989), Ukrainian handball player
- Anna Reich (born 1994), German ice hockey player
- Anna-Giulia Remondina (born 1989), Italian tennis player
- Anna Reymer (born 1985), New Zealand rower
- Anna Rice (born 1980), Canadian badminton player
- Anna Richards (born 1964), New Zealand rugby union player
- Anna Rindeskog (born 1967), Swedish curler
- Anna Ringsred (born 1984), American speed skater
- Anna Rodionova (born 1996), Russian artistic gymnast
- Anna Rodrigues, Brazilian jiu-jitsu practitioner
- Anna Rogers (born 1998), American tennis player
- Anna Rogowska (born 1981), Polish pole vaulter
- Anna Rohrer (born 1997), American long-distance runner
- Anna Rokita (born 1986), Austrian speed skater
- Anna Rostkowska (born 1980), Polish middle-distance runner
- Anna Rostova (born 1950), Soviet volleyball player
- Anna Rudolf (born 1987), Hungarian chess player
- Anna Rüh (born 1993), German discus thrower
- Anna Rupprecht (born 1996), German ski jumper
- Anna Rybaczewski (born 1982), French volleyball player
- Anna Rybicka (born 1977), Polish fencer
- Anna Ryzhykova (born 1989), Ukrainian hurdler
- Anna Sablina (born 1945), Russian speed skater
- Anna Salnikova (born 1987), Georgian swimmer
- Anna Samoylik (born 1995), Russian curler
- Anna Samu (born 1996), Hungarian footballer
- Anna Sanchis (born 1987), Spanish cyclist
- Anna Sandberg (born 2003), Swedish association football player
- Anna Santamans (born 1993), French swimmer
- Anna Santer (born 1975), Italian cross-country skier
- Anna Sapozhnikova (born 1997), Russian Paralympic athlete
- Anna Saraeva (born 1978), Russian judoka
- Anna M. Sargsyan (born 2001), Armenian chess player
- Anna Felicitas Sarholz (born 1992), German footballer
- Anna Sas (born 2003), Belarusian footballer
- Anna Savelyeva (born 1977), Russian speed skater
- Anna Savonina (born 2001), Russian ice hockey player
- Anna Schaffelhuber (born 1993), German para-alpine skier
- Anna Schell (born 1993), German freestyle wrestler
- Anna Katharina Schmid (born 1989), Swiss pole vaulter
- Anna Karolína Schmiedlová (born 1994), Slovak tennis player
- Anna-Bianca Schnitzmeier (born 1990), German cyclist
- Anna Seaton (born 1964), American rower
- Anna Sedoykina (born 1984), Russian handball player
- Anna Seebacher (born 1994), Austrian cross-country skier
- Anna Segal (born 1986), Australian Olympic freestyle skier, twice world champion
- Anna Segedi (born 2000), American ice hockey player
- Anna Seidel (born 1998), German short track speed skater
- Anna Sen (born 1990), Russian handball player
- Anna Senjuschenko (1961–1979), Australian soccer player
- Anna Sergeyeva (born 1975), Russian rower
- Anna Serme (born 1991), Czech squash player
- Anna Sofía Sevdal (born 1993), Faroese footballer
- Anna Shackley (born 2001), British cyclist
- Anna Shaposhnikova (born 1999), Russian handball player
- Anna Sharevich (born 1985), Belarusian chess player
- Anna Shchagina (born 1991), Russian middle-distance runner
- Anna Shcherbakova (born 2004), Russian figure skater
- Anna Sheina (born 2000), Russian handball player
- Anna Sheremet (born 2001), Ukrainian rower
- Anna Shevchenko (born 1993), Kazakhstani cross-country skier
- Anna Shibanova (born 1994), Russian ice hockey player
- Anna Shikusho (born 1995), Namibian footballer
- Anna Shokhina (born 1997), Russian ice hockey player
- Anna Shorina (born 1982), Russian synchronized swimmer
- Anna Shpyneva (born 2002), Russian ski jumper
- Anna Shukhman (born 2009), Russian chess player
- Anna Shukina (born 1987), Russian ice hockey player
- Anna Shumilova (born 1980), Russian coach in rhythmic gymnastics
- Anna Sidorova (born 1991), Russian curler
- Anna Monika Siepmann (born 2004), German athlete
- Anna Signeul (born 1961), Swedish footballer and manager
- Anna Silaeva (born 1992), Russian former competitive pair skater
- Anna Silvander (born 1993), Swedish middle-distance runner
- Anna Simcic (born 1971), New Zealand swimmer
- Anna Sipos (1908–1988), Hungarian table tennis player
- Anna Sisková (born 2001), Czech tennis player
- Anna Sivkova (born 1982), Russian fencer
- Anna Sixtová (born 1996), Czech cross-country skier
- Anna Sjöström (born 1977), Swedish footballer
- Anna Skawinska (born 1981), Polish cyclist
- Anna Skoda, Czech luger
- Anna Skolarczyk (born 1956), Polish swimmer
- Anna Margrete Sletsjøe (born 1997), Norwegian canoeist
- Anna Sloan (born 1991), Scottish curler
- Anna Slunga-Tallberg (born 1962), Finnish sailor
- Anna Smashnova (born 1976), Belarus-born Israeli tennis player
- Anna Smith (born 1978), New Zealand cricketer
- Anna Smith (born 1988), British tennis player
- Anna Smolina (born 1994), Russian tennis player
- Anna Sobczak (born 1967), Polish fencer
- Anna Söderberg (born 1973), Swedish discus thrower
- Anna Sokolova (born 1995), Cypriot rhythmic gymnast
- Anna Sorokina (born 1981), Russian biathlete
- Anna Rita Sparaciari (born 1959), Italian fencer
- Anna Sparre, Swedish kitesurfer
- Anna Sprung (born 1975), Russian biathlete
- Anna Spyridopoulou (born 1988), Greek basketball player
- Anna Niki Stamolamprou (born 1995), Greek basketball player
- Anna Stanley (born 1976), New Zealand netball player
- Anna Stembridge (born 1981), netball player and coach
- Anna Stera-Kustusz (born 1974), Polish biathlete
- Anna Steven (born 2000), New Zealand athlete
- Anna Stöhr (born 1988), Austrian rock climber
- Anna Zita Maria Stricker (born 1994), Italian cyclist
- Anna Odine Strøm (born 1998), Norwegian ski jumper
- Anna Styazhkina (born 1997), Russian chess player
- Anna Stylianou (born 1986), Cypriot swimmer
- Anna Šubrtová (born 2002), Czech footballer
- Anna Sunadóttir Hansen (born 1998), Faroese footballer
- Anna Surmilina (born 1998), Russian snowboarder
- Anna Svendsen (born 1990), Norwegian cross-country skier
- Anna Svenjeby (born 1962), Swedish footballer
- Anna Malvina Svennung (born 1984) Swedish rower
- Anna-Karin Svensson (born 1974), Swedish tennis player
- Anna Swenn-Larsson (born 1991), Swedish alpine skier
- Anna Świderek (born 1979), Polish volleyball player
- Anna Szafraniec (born 1981), Polish cyclist
- Anna Szántó (born 1966), Hungarian handball player
- Anna Sztankovics (born 1996), Hungarian swimmer
- Anna Szymańska (born 1988), Polish footballer
- Anna Szymul, Polish Paralympic athlete
- Anna Tabacchi (born 1976), Italian figure skater
- Anna Tamminen (born 1994), Finnish footballer
- Anna Tanzini (1914–?), Italian gymnast
- Anna Tarasova (born 1980), Kazakhstani athlete
- Anna Tarusina (born 2003), Russian figure skater
- Anna Tatarinova (born 1978), Belarusian footballer
- Anna Tatishvili (born 1990), Georgian tennis player
- Anna Tavano (1948–2012), French Paralympic athlete
- Anna Taylor (born 1991), New Zealand para cyclist
- Anna Teague (born 1987), Australian rules footballer
- Anna Thompson, multiple people
- Anna Tikhomirova, Russian table tennis player
- Anna Timofeeva (born 1987), Russian water polo player
- Anna Timofeyeva (born 1996), Russian ice hockey player
- Anna Tkach (born 1975), Israeli sprinter
- Anna Toman (born 1993), English field hockey player
- Anna Torrodà (born 2000), Spanish footballer
- Anna Torsani (born 2001), Sammarinese alpine skier
- Anna Trener-Wierciak (born 1991), Polish Paralympic athlete
- Anna Trevisi (born 1992), Italian cyclist
- Anna Troup (born 1970), British ultra runner
- Anna Tunnicliffe (born 1982), American sailor
- Anna Turney (born 1979), British Paralympic alpine skier
- Anna Turvey (born 1980), Irish cyclist
- Anna Twardosz (born 2001), Polish ski jumper
- Anna Unger (born 1944), German cross-country skier
- Anna Uryniuk (born 1974), Polish swimmer
- Anna Ushenina (born 1985), Ukrainian chess grandmaster
- Anna Ustinova (high jumper) (born 1985), Kazakhstani high jumper
- Anna Ustinova, Russian mountain bike orienteer
- Anna Ustyukhina (born 1989), Russian water polo player
- Anna Valaka (born 1999), Latvian footballer
- Anna Valesi (born 2002), Italian pair skater
- Anna Van Bellinghen (born 1994), Belgian weightlifter
- Anna Van Marcke (1924–2012), Belgian sprint canoeist
- Anna Várhelyi (born 1991), Hungarian fencer
- Anna Vasenina (born 1999), Russian chess player
- Anna van der Vegt (1903–1983), Dutch gymnast
- Anna Veith (born 1989), Austrian alpine skier
- Anna Velikiy (born 1982), Soviet Uzbek-born Israeli volleyball player
- Anna Vereshchak (born 2001), Russian handball player
- Anna Vernikov (born 2002), American-Israeli pair skater
- Anna Verouli (born 1956), Greek javelin thrower
- Anna Vikman (born 1981), Swedish ice hockey player
- Anna Villani (born 1966), Italian marathon runner
- Anna Vincenti (born 1995), Maltese footballer
- Anna Vinogradova (born 1991), Russian ice hockey player
- Anna Visigalli (born 1981), Italian long jumper
- Anna Voloshyna (born 1991), Ukrainian synchronized swimmer
- Anna Vozakova (born 1989), Russian beach volleyball player
- Anna Vyakhireva (born 1995), Russian handball player
- Anna-Stina Wahlberg (1931–2020), Swedish diver
- Anna Warakomska (born 1992), Polish chess player
- Anna Leigh Waters (born 2007), American professional pickleball player
- Anna Watkins (born 1983), British rower
- Anna Watson, American fitness trainer and collegiate cheerleader
- Anna Weinzieher (born 1990), Polish sailor
- Anna Weis (born 1998), American sailor
- Anna Wielebnowska (born 1978), Polish basketball player
- Anna Wielgosz (born 1993), Polish middle-distance runner
- Anna Wierzba (born 2000), Danish handball player
- Anna Wierzbowska (born 1990), Polish rower
- Anna Wilgren (born 1999), American ice hockey player
- Anna Wijk (born 1991), Swedish floorball player
- Anna Willard (born 1984), American middle-distance runner
- Anna Willcox-Silfverberg (born 1992), New Zealand freestyle skier
- Anna Wilson (born 1997), American basketball player
- Anna Wilson (born 1977), New Zealand swimmer
- Anna Windsor (born 1976), Australian swimmer
- Anna Wishink (born 1989), Australian tennis player
- Anna Włodarczyk (born 1951), Polish long jumper
- Anna Wood (born 1966), Dutch-born Australian sprint canoeist
- Anna Wörner (born 1989), German freestyle skier
- Anna Wroblewski, American poker player
- Anna Wysokińska (born 1987), Polish handball player
- Anna Yamazaki (born 1999), Japanese sailor
- Anna Yanovskaya (born 1996), Russian ice dancer
- Anna Zadorozhniuk (born 1984), Ukrainian ice dancer
- Anna Zaja (born 1991), German tennis player
- Anna Zaporozhanova (born 1979), Ukrainian tennis player
- Anna Zatonskih (born 1978), Ukrainian-American chess player
- Anna Zatuşevscaia (born 1995), Moldovan footballer
- Anna Żelazko (born 1983), Polish footballer
- Anna Żemła-Krajewska (born 1979), Polish judoka
- Anna Zerilli, American football placekicker
- Anna Zhigalova (born 1981), Russian sumo wrestler
- Anna Zibrandtsen (born 1994), Danish dressage rider
- Anna Carin Zidek (born 1973), Swedish biathlete
- Anna Zíková (born 1998), Czech ice hockey player
- Anna Zimina (born 1939), Soviet middle-distance runner
- Anna Zozulia (born 1980), Belgian chess player
- Anna Zubkova (born 1980), Kazakhstani water polo player
- Anna Zugno (born 1984), Italian cyclist
- Anna Zukal (born 1985), Russian freestyle skier
- Anna Zwirydowska (born 1986), Polish wrestler
- Nazo Anā, (1651–1717) Afghan poet

=== Miscellaneous ===
- Anna the Prophetess, prophetess mentioned in the Gospel of Luke 2:36
- Anna Åfelt, Swedish teacher
- Anna-Britt Agnsäter, Swedish home economics teacher
- Anna Ahlström (1863–1943), Swedish teacher, principal, and school founder
- Anna Akasoy, German orientalist and professor
- Anna Anderson (1896–1984), Romanov impostor who claimed she was the Grand Duchess Anastasia of Russia
- Anna Anni (1926–2011), Italian costume designer
- Anna Berentine Anthoni (1884–1951), Norwegian trade unionist and politician
- Anna Anthropy, American video game designer
- Anna Astakhova (1886–1971), Russian folklorist
- Anna Ayala (born 1965), American woman
- Anna Magdalena Bach (1701–1760), German singer and second wife of Johann Sebastian Bach
- Anna Lemmer Badenhorst Rudolph, South African author and composer
- Anna Elisabeth Baer, 18th-century Finnish merchant
- Anna Warner Bailey, American revolutionary hero
- Anna Baldwin, American dairy farmer and inventor
- Anna Barrows (died 1948), American educator and author
- Anna Barwick, Australian pharmacist
- Anna Haining Bates (1846–1888), Canadian woman notable for her great height
- Anna Bayle (born 1956), Filipino supermodel
- Anna Louise Beer (1924–2010), Norwegian lawyer and women's rights activist
- Anna Fisher Beiler (1848–1904), British-born American missionary, newspaper editor
- Anna Ben-Yusuf (died 1909), milliner and fashion designer
- Anna Whelan Betts (1873–1959), American illustrator and art teacher
- Anna White, shaker eldress and social reformer
- Anna Bijns (1493–1575), Flemish writer, schoolteacher, and nun
- Anna Binder-Urbanová (1912–2004), rescued Jews during the Holocaust
- Anna Blackburne (1726–1793), English naturalist and collector
- Anna Bliss (1843–1925), American teacher in South Africa
- Anna Campbell Bliss (1925–2015), American painter and architect
- Anna Böeseken (1905–1997), South African academic, historian, and writer
- Anna Sofie Boesen Dreijer (1899–1986), Danish schoolteacher
- Anna Borgeryd (1969–2019), Swedish entrepreneur, author, and blogger
- Anna Borghi, cognitive psychologist
- Anna Botsford Comstock (1854–1930), American artist, educator, and conservationist
- Anna Branzell (1895–1983), Swedish architect
- Anna Bravo (1938–2019), Italian social historian and feminist
- Anna Mary Winifred Brotherton (1874–1956), Australian founder of the Castlemaine Art Museum, a Red Cross volunteer, Girl Guide leader, and botanical collector
- Anna E. Brown, New Zealand book designer and lecturer
- Anna Hedvig Büll (1887–1981), Estonian missionary
- Anna Byford Leonard (1843–1930), American social reformer, ceramic artist, art teacher, author, and missionary
- Anna Campbell (1991–2018), British anarcha-feminist
- Anna Carlström (1780–1850), Swedish brothel owner
- Anna Ella Carroll (1815–1894), American politician, pamphleteer, and lobbyist
- Anna Caspari (1900–1941), German art dealer
- Anna Castelli Ferrieri (1918–2006), Italian architect and industrial designer
- Anna Chapman (born 1982), Russian intelligence agent, media personality, and model
- Anna McClarmonde Chase (1809–1874), American spy
- Anna Chennault (1925–2018), Chinese war correspondent and member of the China lobby
- Anna Chernenko (1913–2010), Belarusian woman specialized in agriculture
- Anna Chertkova (1859–1927), writer, social activist, and artist's model
- Anna Dorota Chrzanowska, Polish heroine of the Polish-Ottoman War
- Anna de Coningh, early enslaved South African and progenitrix
- Anna Connelly, American inventor
- Anna Cotton, English ironmaster
- Anna Crighton (born 1944), New Zealand heritage campaigner and local politician
- Anna Czóbel (1918–2012), Hungarian cinematographer
- Anna Laurens Dawes (1851–1938), American author and suffragist
- Anna Demidova (1878–1918), Russian lady-in-waiting
- Anna DePalma (born 1991), American social media personality and professional golfer
- Anna Elizabeth Dickinson (1842–1932), American abolitionist and suffragist
- Anna de Diesbach (1844–1929), rose breeder
- Anna Thompson Dodge (1871–1970), Scottish-American art collector, philanthropist, and automotive heiress
- Anna Sergeyevna Dolgorukaya, Russian pedagogue, noble and courtier
- Anna Dostoevskaya (1846–1918), Russian memoirist
- Anna Dubois (born 1962), Swedish organizational theorist
- Anna Durytska (born 1991), Ukrainian fashion model
- Anna Ecklund (1882–1941), American woman with alleged demonic possession
- Anna B. Eckstein (1868–1947), German pacifist
- Anna Ehn, Austrian Righteous Among the Nations
- Anna Ewers, (born 1993), German fashion model
- Anna Eva Fay (1851–1927), American spiritual medium
- Anna Federmesser (born 1977), Russian humanitarian worker
- Anna Fendi (born 1933), Italian fashion designer and entrepreneur
- Anna Lee Fisher (born 1949), American astronaut and medical doctor
- Anna L. Fisher (1878–1939), American Red Cross worker
- Anna Fleischle, German set and costume designer
- Anna Fox (born 1961), British documentary photographer
- Anna Isabel Fox (1890–1974), American educator and Christian missionary
- Anna Freeman, Australian trumpet player and teacher
- Anna Gabriel i Sabaté, Canadian teacher, activist, politician, and trade unionist
- Anna Rosina Gambold (1762–1821), American Moravian missionary and diarist
- Anna Gaskell (born 1969), American art photographer and artist
- Anna Gordy Gaye (1922–2014), American record executive
- Anna Bella Geiger, Brazilian artist and professor
- Anna Giacomini, civil engineer
- Anna Gonsalves Paes de Azevedo (1612–1674), Brazil plantation owner
- Anna Gould (1875–1961), American heiress and socialite
- Anna Gurney (1795–1857), English scholar, philanthropist, geologist, and a member of the Gurney family of Norfolk
- Anna Gustafsson Chen (born 1965), Swedish translator and sinologist
- Anna Haapasalo (1882–1965), Finnish baker and politician
- Anna Hallowell (1831–1905), American education reformer, feminist, anti slavery activist, and welfare worker
- Anna Roosevelt Halsted (1906–1975), only daughter of President Franklin D. Roosevelt
- Anna Hannevik (1925–2025), Norwegian Salvation Army commissioner
- Anna Harrison (1775–1864), wife of president William Henry Harrison
- Anna Mae Hays (1920–2018), United States Armed Forces officer
- Anna-Britta Hellbom (1919–2004), Swedish anthropologist and Americanist
- Anna von Helmholtz (1834–1899), German salonnière and writer
- Anna Heringer (born 1977), German architect
- Anna Hillmayer, 20th-century German woman
- Anna Hinderer (c. 1827–1870), British missionary in Nigeria
- Anna Hiss (1893–1972), American physical education teacher
- Anna Hogenskild (1513–1590), Swedish court official and landowner
- Anna Hojska (1530–1617), Ruthenian noblewoman and patron of religion
- Anna Hornung (1922–2012), a woman from Poland who rescued Jews during World War II
- Anna Moncrieff Hovey (1902–1995), Canadian pianist and educator
- Anna Graham Hunter, American writer and career coach
- Anna Jabłonowska (1728–1800), Polish magnate and politician
- Anna Jaffé (1845–1942), Belgian-French art collector
- Anna Madgigine Jai Kingsley (1793–1870), formerly enslaved woman who became a major enslaver in Florida and Haiti
- Anna Jakubowska (1927–2022), Polish WWII combatant
- Anna Jarvis (1864–1948), founder of Mother's Day
- Anna Jekiełek (1937–2021), Polish set and costume designer
- Anna Jennings-Edquist (born 1985), Australian lawyer and actress
- Anna Jens, 18th/19th century Dutch East Indies resident, convicted of abuse of enslaved people
- Anna Jewsbury, English fashion designer
- Anna Hill Johnstone (1913–1992), American costume designer
- Anna Johnson Julian (1901–1994), African-American sociologist and civic activist
- Anna Jones, British food writer and stylist
- Anna Kaas, Danish lady-in-waiting
- Anna Karlsdotter, Swedish noble and landholder
- Anna-Maja Kazarian (born 2000), Dutch chess player and Twitch streamer
- Anna Keay (born 1974), British architectural historian, author and TV personality
- Anna Keichline (1889–1943), American architect
- Anna Kennedy (born 1960), special education campaigner
- Anna Kikina (born 1984), Russian engineer and cosmonaut
- Anna Kingsford (1846–1888), English medical doctor, activist and feminist
- Anna Klingmann (born 1965), German architect, urbanist, author and academic
- Anna Kochanowska (1922–2019), Polish radio journalist, literary director and politician
- Anna Kohler, German-American theater actress and translator
- Anna Kong Mei, Chinese social worker
- Anna Koppitz, Austrian photographer
- Anna Krasnowolska, Polish Iranologist
- Anna Krauss, German clairvoyant and fortune-teller
- Anna Kuzmina (1933–2017), Soviet Yakut actress and politician
- Anna Lakrini, Filipina model and beauty pageant holder
- Anna Lappé, American author and educator
- Anna Leporskaya (1900–1982), Russian imperial and Soviet painter
- Anna Leska (1910–1998), Polish pilot, one of three female Polish pilots to fly in the British Air Transport Auxiliary
- Anna Leszczyńska (1660–1727), mother of Stanislaw Leszczynski, king of Poland
- Anna Frances Levins (1876–1941), Irish-American artist, artist publisher, author and activist
- Anna Linnikova (born 2000), Russian model and beauty pageant titleholder
- Anna Lisitsyna (1922–1942), Soviet Karelian partisan
- Anna T. Litovkina (born 1963), Russian-born Hungarian linguist, psychologist and coach
- Anna Cristina Niceta Lloyd (born 1970), Italian-American event planner
- Anna Kazanjian Longobardo (1928–2020), American engineer
- Anna LoPizzo, American trade unionist
- Anna Lopukhina (1777–1805), Russian imperial mistress
- Anna W. Ludlow (1865–1955), Choctaw teacher
- Anna Mahase (1932/1933–2024), Trinidad and Tobago headteacher
- Anna Mangin (1844–1931), American inventor and women's rights campaigner
- Anna Vasilievna Maraeva (1845–1928), Russian industrialist
- Anna Maslovskaya (1920–1980), Soviet Belarusian partisan
- Anna Mässrur (1849–1913), Swedish missionary
- Anna Veronica Mautner (1935–2019), Brazilian psychoanalyst, journalist and university teacher
- Anna Maxwell (1851–1929), American nursing pioneer
- Anna McGurk (1968–1991), British murder victim
- Anna Caulfield McKnight (1866–1927), American suffragist and businesswoman
- Anna McNeill Whistler (1804–1881), mother of painter James McNeill Whistler
- Anna Meder (1606–1649), German printer
- Anna Menon, SpaceX Mission Director and commercial astronaut
- Anna Millikin, teacher and author
- Anna Min, American photographer
- Anna Mitchell (1926–2012), Cherokee potter from Oklahoma
- Anna V. S. Mitchell (1878–1966), American Red Cross worker
- Anna Mohr (1944–2020), Swedish archaeologist and activist
- Anna Mons (1672–1714), Dutch commoner who almost succeeded in marrying Tsar Peter the Great
- Anna Moroni (born 1939), Italian cook
- Anna Morozova (1921–1944), Soviet partisan
- Anna Morris Holstein (1824–1901), American organizational founder, civil war nurse and author
- Anna M. Morrison Reed, American poet and suffragist
- Anna Nakwaska (1779 or 1781–1851), Polish author and educationist
- Anna Nanousi, Greek fashion model and television presenter
- Anna Nehrebecka (born 1947), Polish actress and politician
- Anna B. Nickels (1832–1917), American botanist, botanical collector, and plant nursery owner
- Anna Nitschmann (1715–1760), Moravian Brethren missionary and poet
- Anna October, Ukrainian fashion designer
- Anna Orosz (born 1989), Hungarian economist and politician
- Anna Susanne von der Osten (1704–1773), Danish courtier and philanthropist
- Anna Patterson, software engineer
- Anna Peacock, photonics researcher
- Anna Plischke (1895–1983), New Zealand garden and landscape designer
- Anna Poslavska (born 1987), Ukrainian beauty pageant titleholder
- Anna Potok, Polish-born fur designer
- Anna Pratt, multiple people
- Anna-Lülja Praun, Austrian architect
- Anna Prelević (born 1990), Greek TV presenter and model
- Anna Protasova (1745–1826), Russian noblewoman and lady-in-waiting
- Anna B. Puglisi, American security analyst
- Anna Pump (1934–2015), American chef
- Anna Letycia Quadros (1929–2018), Brazilian artist and educator
- Anna Raudkats (1886–1965), Estonian folk dance reviver
- Anna Rawson (born 1981), Australian model and golfer
- Anna Reading, British author and educator
- Anna Ryder Richardson (born 1964), British interior designer and television personality
- Anna-Grethe Rischel (born 1935), Danish paper historian
- Anna Riwkin-Brick (1908–1970), Russian-born Swedish photographer
- Anna Rosling Rönnlund (born 1975), Swedish designer
- Anna Hall Roosevelt (1863–1892), mother of Eleanor Roosevelt
- Anna Birgitta Rooth (1919–2000), Swedish ethnology professor
- Anna Rose (born 1983), Australian author, activist, and environmentalist
- Anna Rosenwasser (born 1990), Swiss journalist, activist, and politician
- Anna Rūmane-Ķeniņa (1877–1950), Latvian teacher and writer
- Anna Sacher (1859–1930), Austrian hotel owner and proprietor
- Anna Pendleton Schenck (1874–1915), American architect
- Anna Scher, British drama teacher
- Anna Senior (born 1941), Australian costume designer
- Anna Shchetinina (1908–1999), Soviet sea captain
- Anna B. Sheppard (born 1946), Polish costume designer
- Anna Shteynshleyger, Russian-American photographer
- Anna Peck Sill (1816–1889), American educator
- Anna Singh, Indian fashion designer
- Anna Sitarska (1937–2023), Polish librarian and university teacher
- Anna Skarbek (born 1976), Australian businesswoman and former investment banker
- Anna Slotky (born 1981), American attorney and former actress
- Anna Smith, English broadcaster and film critic
- Anna Deavere Smith (born 1950), African-American actress and playwright
- Anna Smitshuizen (died 1775), Dutch prostitute
- Anna Sokolina (born 1956), American architect, curator, and scholar
- Anna Sorokin (born 1991), Russian-born German fraudster
- Anna Liberata de Souza, 19th century storyteller and maid
- Anna Starbrink (born 1971), Swedish politician
- Anna-Brita Stenström (1937–2023), Norwegian linguist
- Anna Stoehr (1900–2014), American supercentenarian
- Anna Strong (1740–1812), American spy during the American Revolution
- Anna Sui (born 1964), American fashion designer
- Anna Svane (1550–1637), Danish merchant
- Anna Svidersky (1988–2006), American murder victim
- Anna Swanwick (1813–1899), English author and feminist
- Anna Synodinou (1927–2016), Greek actress and politician
- Anna Taylor (fl. 2026), British nutritionist
- Anna Theologou (born 1986), Cypriot economist and politician
- Anna Tuschinski (1841–1939), German-Polish Esperantist
- Anna Uhrväder, Finnish milliner
- Anna Margaret Urbas, American murder victim
- Anna Vagena, Greek actress and politician
- Anna Vandenhoeck (1709–1787), German painter
- Anna Vasilchikova (died 1576), Tsaritsa of All Russia
- Anna Vigfúsdóttir á Stóru-Borg, Icelandic landlord
- Anna Vignoles, British educationalist
- Anna Augusta Von Helmholtz-Phelan (1880–1964), American professor, author
- Anna Vorontsova (1722–1775), Russian lady-in-waiting, Stalinist and noble
- Anna Fellowes Vroland, schoolteacher and human rights advocate
- Anna Lee Waldo (born 1925), American author and chemistry professor
- Anna von Wattenwyl (1841–1927), Swiss religious worker
- Anna Webber (photographer) (born 1986), American photographer
- Anna Catharina Wedderkopf (1715–1786), German businesswoman, consultant, and feminist
- Anna Weinberg, American restaurateur
- Ann Wilkins (1806–1857), American missionary teacher
- Anna Williams, enslaved woman who successfully sued for her freedom
- Anna Wilson (1835–1911), American brothel owner
- Anna H. Wilstach (1822–1892), American art collector
- Anna Wolfrom, early homesteader and writer
- Anna Wood (1980–1995), Australian schoolgirl
- Anna Wulff, Danish kindergarten teacher
- Anna Yegorova (1916–2009), Soviet female Air Force officer
- Anna Zakletska-Burak (born 1984), Ukrainian TV presenter, politician, public activist, and singer
- Anna Zakrzewska (1925–1944), Polish resistance fighter
- Anna Zemanová, Slovak ecologist and politician
- Anna Zilboorg, American knitter and author

as a masculine name

- Anna of East Anglia (died 653 or 654), king of East Anglia

=== Fictional characters ===
- Anna, a character in the 2006 song "Boten Anna" by Basshunter
- Anna, a character in the 2012 American independent feature movie California Solo
- Anna, the sister of Dido, Queen of Carthage, in Roman mythology and later literature
- Anna, an alternate name for Morgause of Arthurian legend
- Anna or Ti'ana, a character in the Myst games
- Anna, a character in the animated series Space Carrier Blue Noah
- Anna, the titular character in Mister God, This Is Anna by Fynn
- Anna, the main character in When Hitler Stole Pink Rabbit by Judith Kerr
- Anna Akechi, the main character in Star Detective Precure!
- Anna Blake, a character from the Scooby-Doo video-games Scooby-Doo! First Frights and Scooby-Doo! and the Spooky Swamp
- Anna Coleman, a character in Freaky Friday
- Anna Delaney, a character in the Netflix series Grand Army
- Anna De Souza, a character in ITV soap opera Emmerdale
- Anna Lightwood, a protagonist from the upcoming series The Last Hours, part of The Shadowhunter Chronicles by Cassandra Clare
- Anna Karenina, a main character in a novel written by Leo Tolstoy of the same name
- Anna Kyoyama, a character from Shaman King
- Anna Kushina, a character from K (TV series)
- Anna Kakuzawa, a character in the Elfen Leid manga series
- Anna Malloy, a character in the 2018 film Tag, played by Isla Fisher
- Anna Manalastas, one of the main characters of the Philippine drama series 100 Days to Heaven
- Anna Marks, a character in the film He's Just Not That Into You
- Anna Marvin, a character in the 1991 American comedy movie What About Bob?
- Anna Perenna, the sister of Dido in Roman mythology and later literature
- Anna Poliatova, character in the 2019 film Anna, played by Sasha Luss
- Anna, Princess of Arendelle and the main protagonist of the Walt Disney Animation Studios film Frozen
- Anna Schmidt, the West German student in Mind Your Language, played by Jacki Harding
- Anna Scott, in Notting Hill, played by Julia Roberts
- Anna Strenger, character from The Witcher 3: Wild Hunt
- Anna Elizabeth "Rag" Shaw, the protagonist in Light of My Life
- Anna Valerious, a character in the 2004 film Van Helsing
- Anna Williams, a character in the Tekken video game series
- Anna Windass, a character in ITV soap opera Coronation Street
- Anna Yamada (山田 杏奈), a character in the web manga and anime series The Dangers in My Heart
- Anna Yanami (八奈見 杏菜), a character in the light novel and anime series Makeine: Too Many Losing Heroines!
- Anna Preston or Sasaki, main character in both the novel and the Ghibli adaptation When Marnie was There.

== See also ==
- Anna Appel (disambiguation)
- Anna (disambiguation)
- Ana (given name)
- Annie (disambiguation)
- Annette (disambiguation)
- Hannah (given name)
