= Boonzaier =

Boonzaier (variously spelled Boonzayer, Boonzaayer, and Boonzaaijer) is a Dutch and Afrikaans surname literally translated as "bean sower", but actually referring to "bone setters", or a form of early chiropracty. Notable individuals with this last name include:

- D. C. Boonzaier (1865–1950), South African cartoonist
- Floretta Boonzaier (born 1974), South African psychologist
- Gregoire Boonzaier (1909–2005), South African artist and son of D. C. Boonzaier
- Janneke Boonzaaijer (born 1996), Dutch equestrian
- John Boonzaaijer (born 1968), American Anglican bishop
- Martin Boonzaayer (born 1972), American judoka
