= Kopano =

Kopano may refer to:

- Kopano (software), an open-source groupware application suite
- Kopano Matlwa (born 1985), South African writer
- Kopano Ratele (born 1969), South African psychologist
- Kopano people, an extinct indigenous tribe in Texas, United States
