= Amphitheatre =

Open air entertainment venue

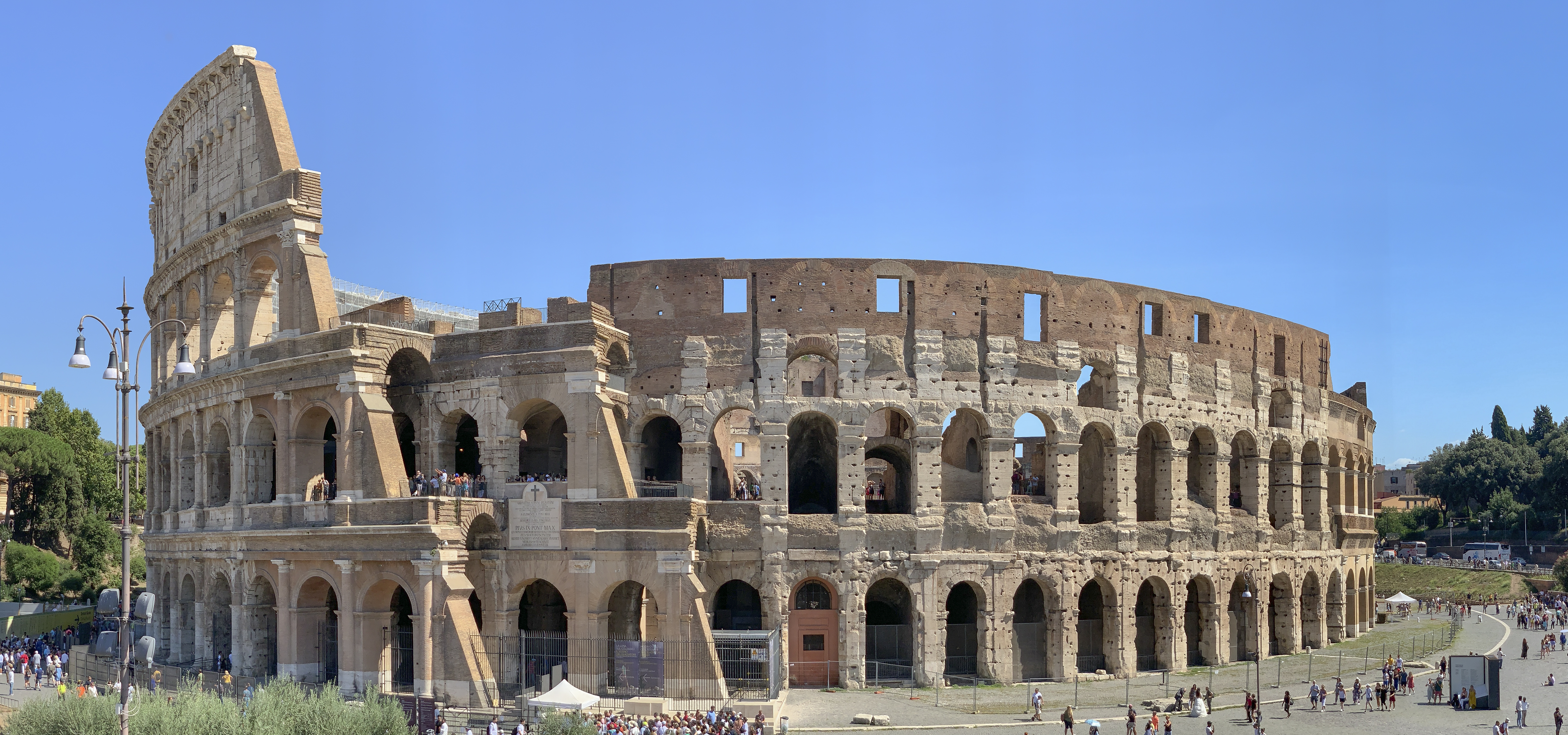
The Colosseum, an amphitheatre in Rome (built 72–80 AD)

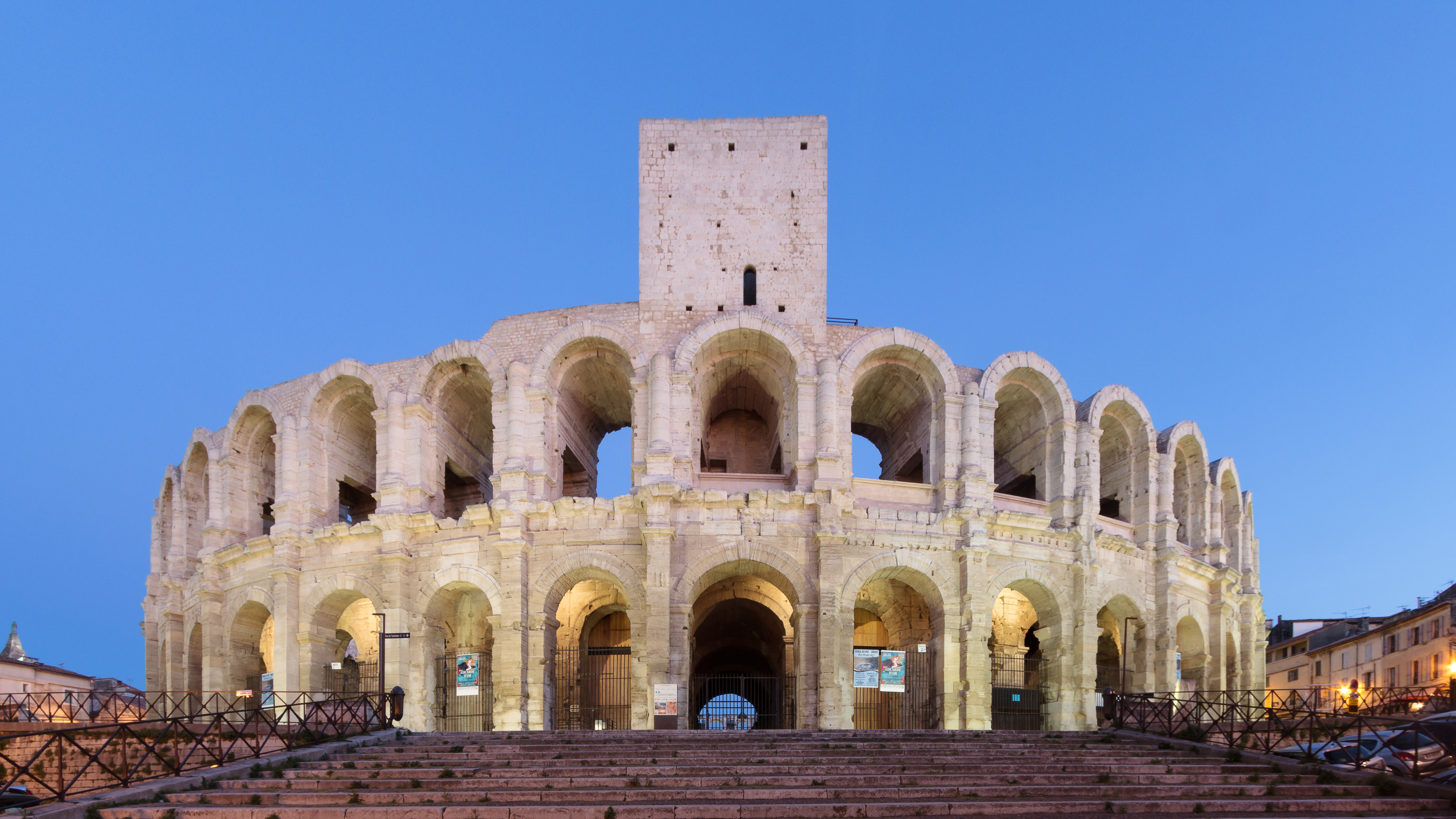
Arles Amphitheatre, France: a Roman arena still used for bullfighting, plays, and summer concerts.

An amphitheatre (American English: amphitheater) is an open-air venue used for entertainment, performances, and sports. The term derives from the ancient Greek ἀμφιθέατρον (amphitheatron), from ἀμφί (amphi), meaning "on both sides" or "around" and θέατρον (théātron), meaning "place for viewing".

Ancient Greek theatres were typically built on hillsides and semi-circular in design. The first amphitheatre may have been built at Pompeii around 70 BC. Ancient Roman amphitheatres were oval or circular in plan, with seating tiers that surrounded the central performance area, like a modern open-air stadium. In contrast, both ancient Greek and ancient Roman theatres were built in a semicircle, with tiered seating rising on one side of the performance area.

Modern English parlance uses "amphitheatre" for any structure with sloping seating, including theatre-style stages with spectator seating on only one side, theatres in the round, and stadia. They can be indoor or outdoor.

== Roman amphitheatres ==
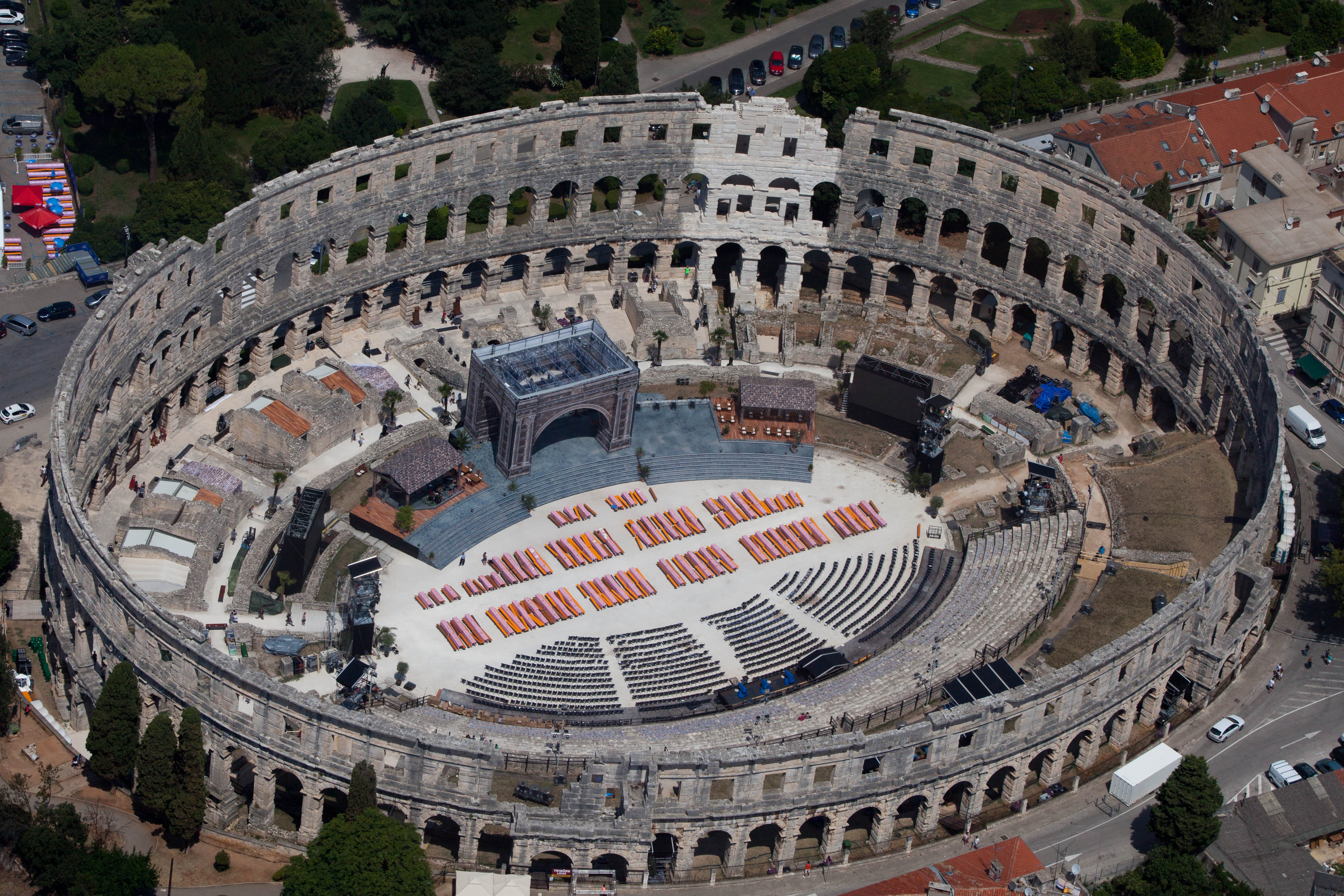
Pula Arena, Croatia

About 230 Roman amphitheatres have been found across the area of the Roman Empire. Their typical shape, functions and name distinguish them from Roman theatres, which are more or less semicircular in shape; from the circuses (similar to hippodromes) whose much longer circuits were designed mainly for horse or chariot racing events; and from the smaller stadia, which were primarily designed for athletics and footraces.

Roman amphitheatres were circular or oval in plan, with a central arena surrounded by perimeter seating tiers. The seating tiers were pierced by entrance-ways controlling access to the arena floor, and isolating it from the audience. Temporary wooden structures functioning as amphitheaters would have been erected for the funeral games held in honour of deceased Roman magnates by their heirs, featuring fights to the death by gladiators, usually armed prisoners of war, at the funeral pyre or tomb of the deceased. These games are described in Roman histories as munera, gifts, entertainments or duties to honour deceased individuals, Rome's gods and the Roman community.

Some Roman writers interpret the earliest attempts to provide permanent amphitheaters and seating for the lower classes as populist political graft, blocked by the Senate as morally objectionable; too-frequent, excessively "luxurious" munera would corrode traditional Roman morals. The provision of permanent seating was thought a particularly objectionable luxury.

The earliest permanent, stone and timber Roman amphitheatre with perimeter seating, the Amphitheater of Statilius Taurus, was built in the Campus Martius in 29 BCE. Most were built under Imperial rule, from the Augustan period (27 BCE–14 CE) onwards. Imperial amphitheatres were built throughout the Roman Empire, especial in provincial capitals and major colonies, as an essential aspect of Romanitas. There was no standard size; the largest could accommodate 40,000–60,000 spectators. The most elaborate featured multi-storeyed, arcaded façades and were decorated with marble, stucco and statuary. The best-known and largest Roman amphitheatre is the Colosseum in Rome, also known as the Flavian Amphitheatre (Amphitheatrum Flavium), after the Flavian dynasty who had it built. After the ending of gladiatorial games in the 5th century and of staged animal hunts in the 6th, most amphitheatres fell into disrepair. Their materials were mined or recycled. Some were razed, and others were converted into fortifications. A few continued as convenient open meeting places; in some of these, churches were sited.

== Modern amphitheatres ==
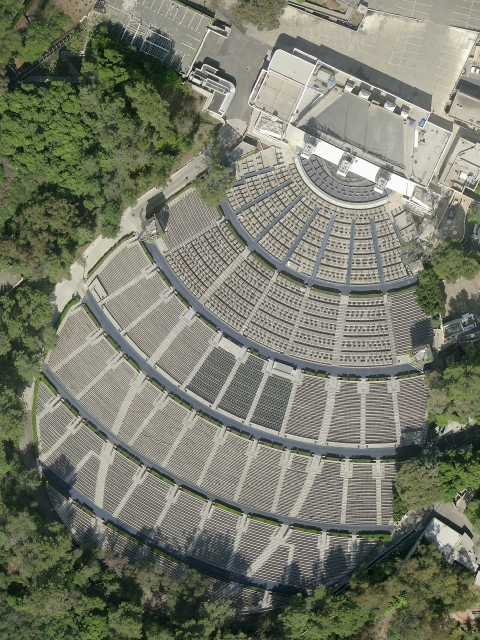
Aerial photograph of the Hollywood Bowl, showing the seating after the 2005 renovation.

In modern English usage of the word, an amphitheatre is not only a circular, but can also be a semicircular or curved performance space, particularly one located outdoors. Contemporary amphitheatres often include standing structures, called bandshells, sometimes curved or bowl-shaped, both behind the stage and behind the audience, creating an area which echoes or amplifies sound, making the amphitheatre ideal for musical or theatrical performances. Small-scale amphitheatres can serve to host outdoor local community performances.

Notable modern amphitheatres include the Shoreline Amphitheatre, the Hollywood Bowl and the Aula Magna at Stockholm University. The term "amphitheatre" is also used for some indoor venues, such as the (by now demolished) Gibson Amphitheatre and Chicago International Amphitheatre.

== Natural amphitheatres ==
A natural amphitheatre is a performance space located in a spot where a steep mountain or a particular rock formation naturally amplifies or echoes sound, making it ideal for musical and theatrical performances. An amphitheatre can be naturally occurring formations which would be ideal for this purpose, even if no theatre has been constructed there.

Notable natural amphitheatres include the Drakensberg Amphitheatre in South Africa, Slane Castle in Ireland, the Supernatural Amphitheatre in Australia, and the Red Rocks and the Gorge Amphitheatres in the western United States.

There is evidence that the Anasazi people used natural amphitheatres for the public performance of music in Pre-Columbian times including a large constructed performance space in Chaco Canyon, New Mexico.

== See also ==
- Odeon (building)
- Colosseum
- Ancient theatres
  - Theatre of ancient Greece
  - List of ancient Greek theatres
- Arena
- Thingplatz
- List of Roman amphitheatres
- List of contemporary amphitheatres
- List of indoor arenas
