= Ralph Erskine (architect) =

British architect (1914–2005)

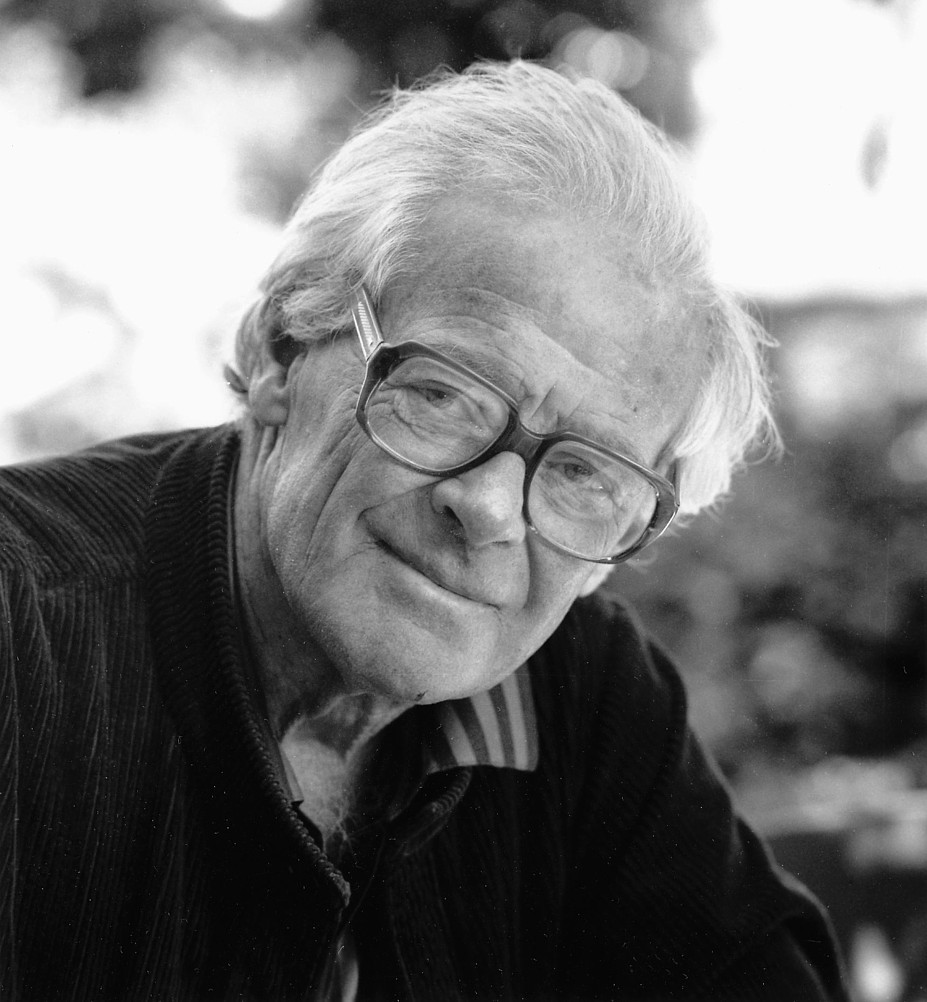
- Erskine in 1987
- Born: 24 February 1914; Mill Hill, London, England
- Died: 16 March 2005 (aged 91); Drottningholm, Sweden

Ralph Erskine ARIBA (24 February 1914 – 16 March 2005) was a British architect and planner who lived and worked in Sweden nearly his entire life.

== Upbringing and influences ==
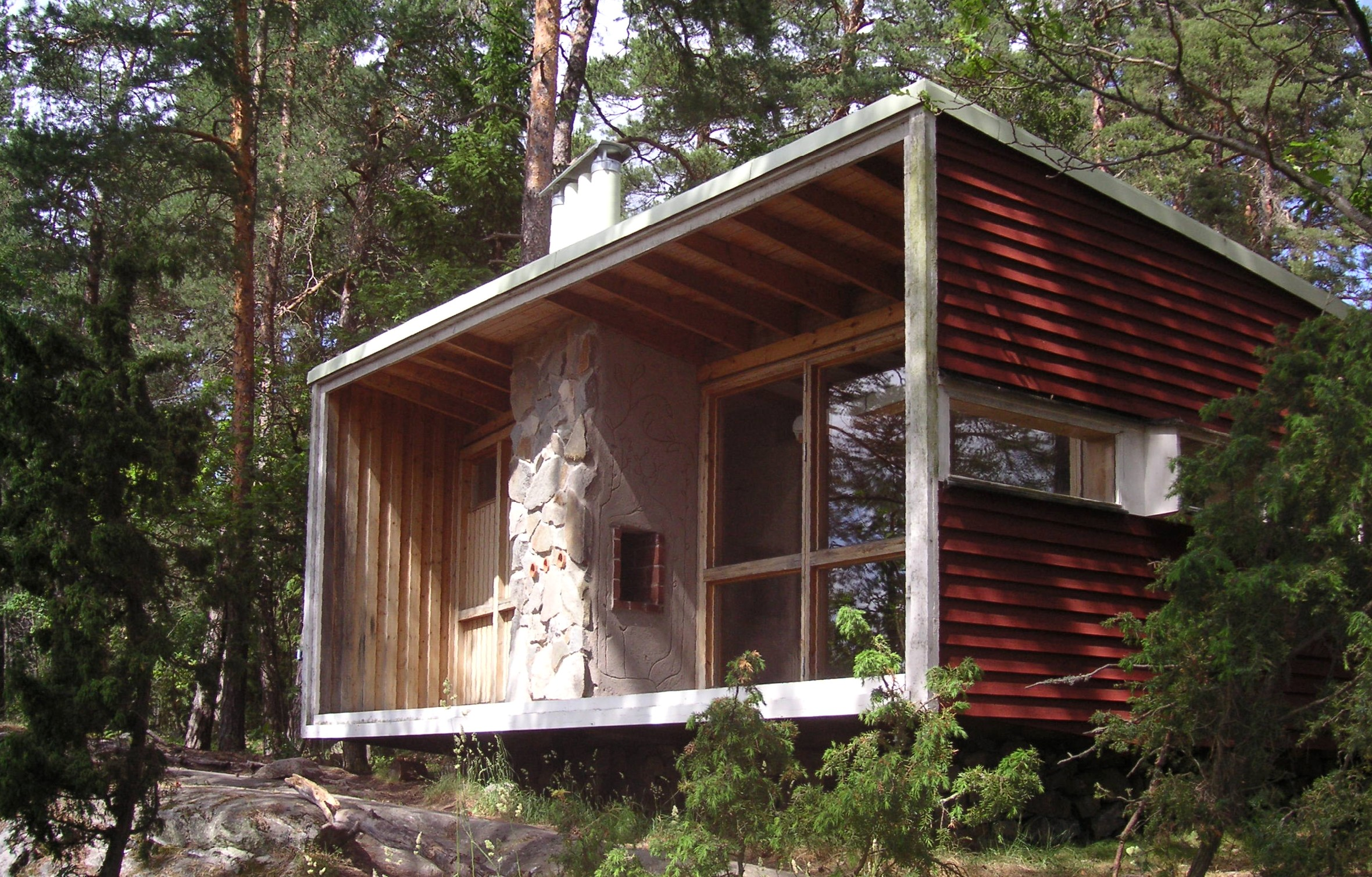
Lådan (the Box) Erskine's first home south of Stockholm, built 1941–42, rebuilt 1989 on Lovö.

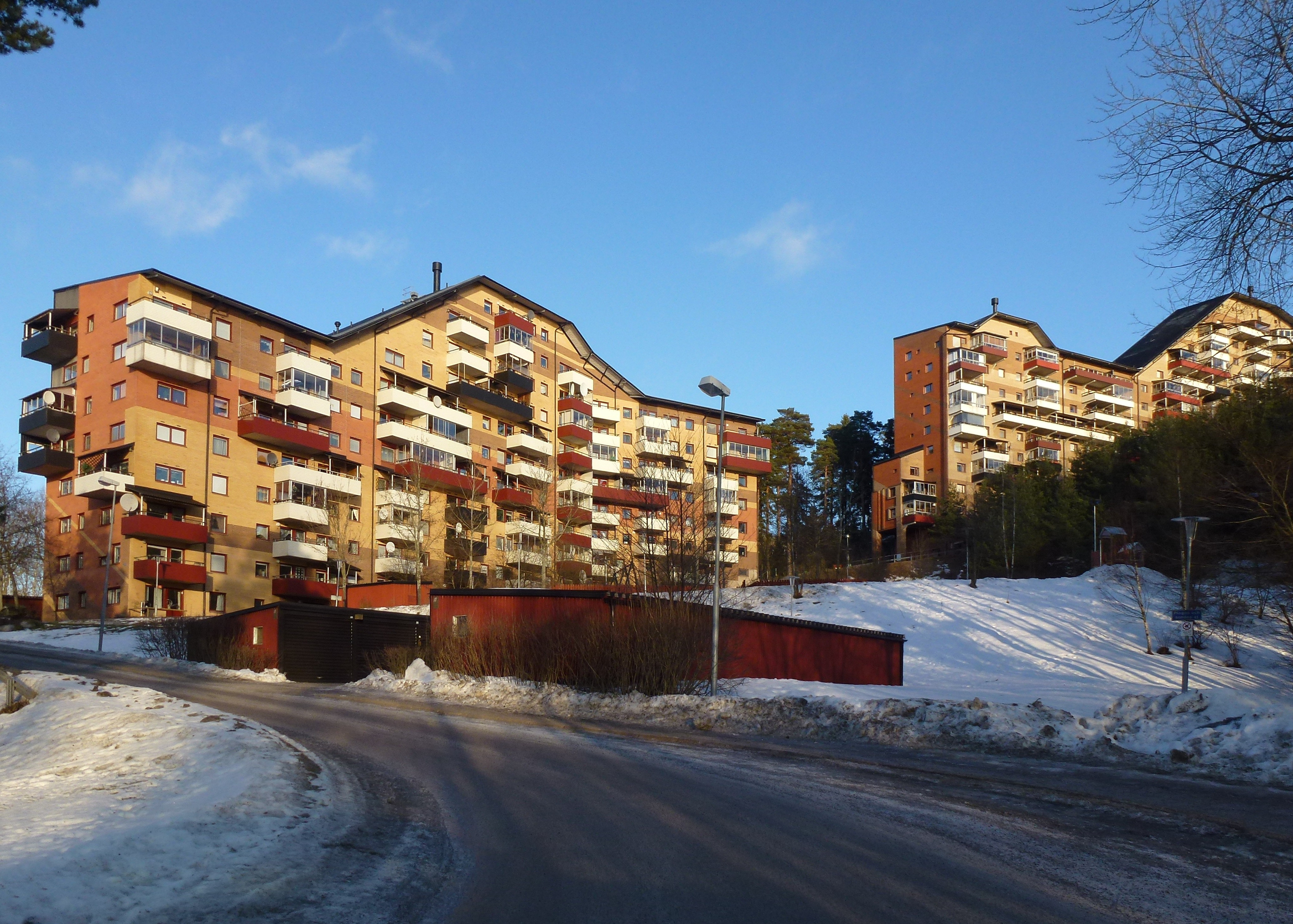
View of Myrstuguberget, Masmo, Huddinge, Sweden, designed by Ralph Erskine.

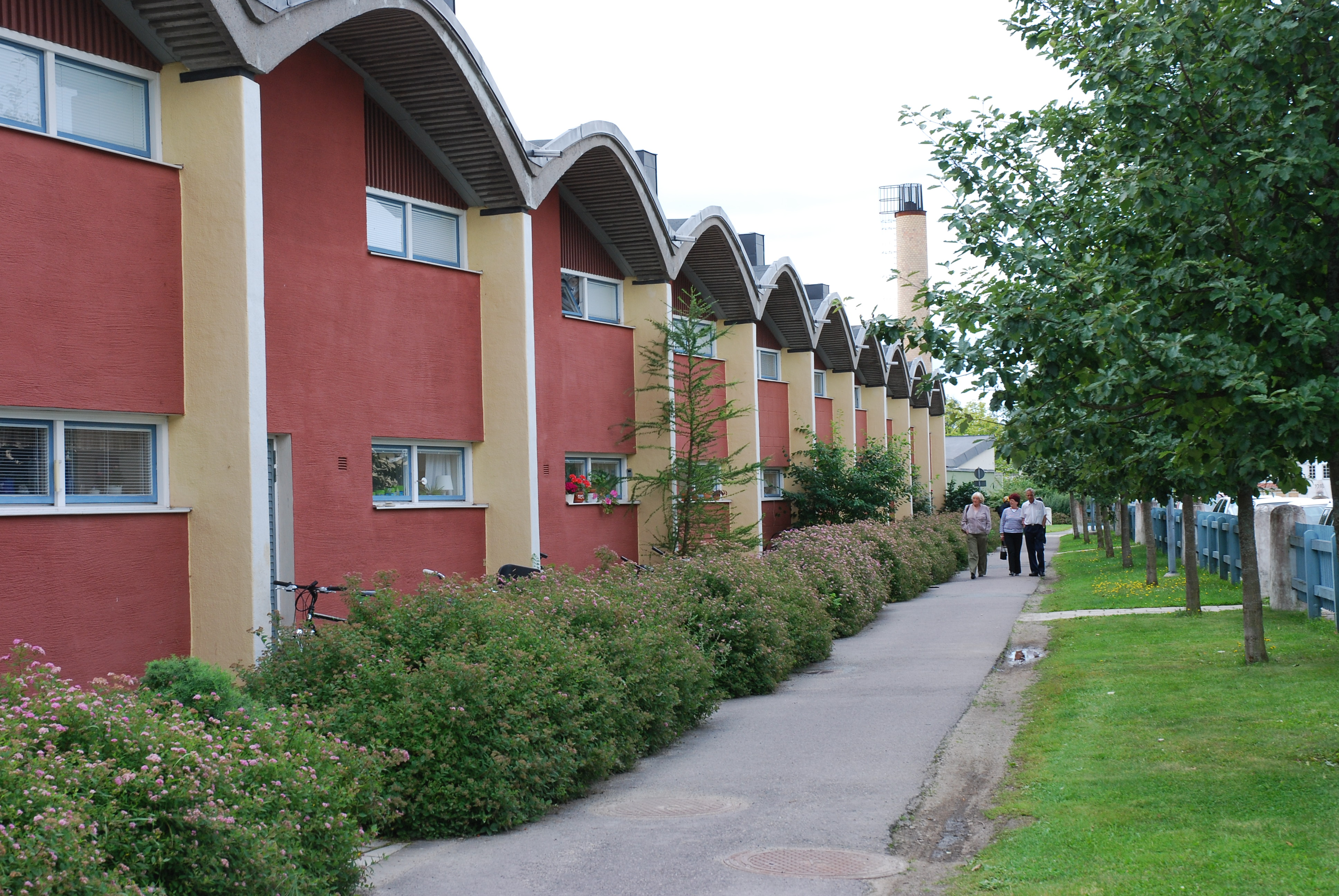
Terrace houses at Gyttorp, Nora, Sweden. Photo: Bengt Oberger

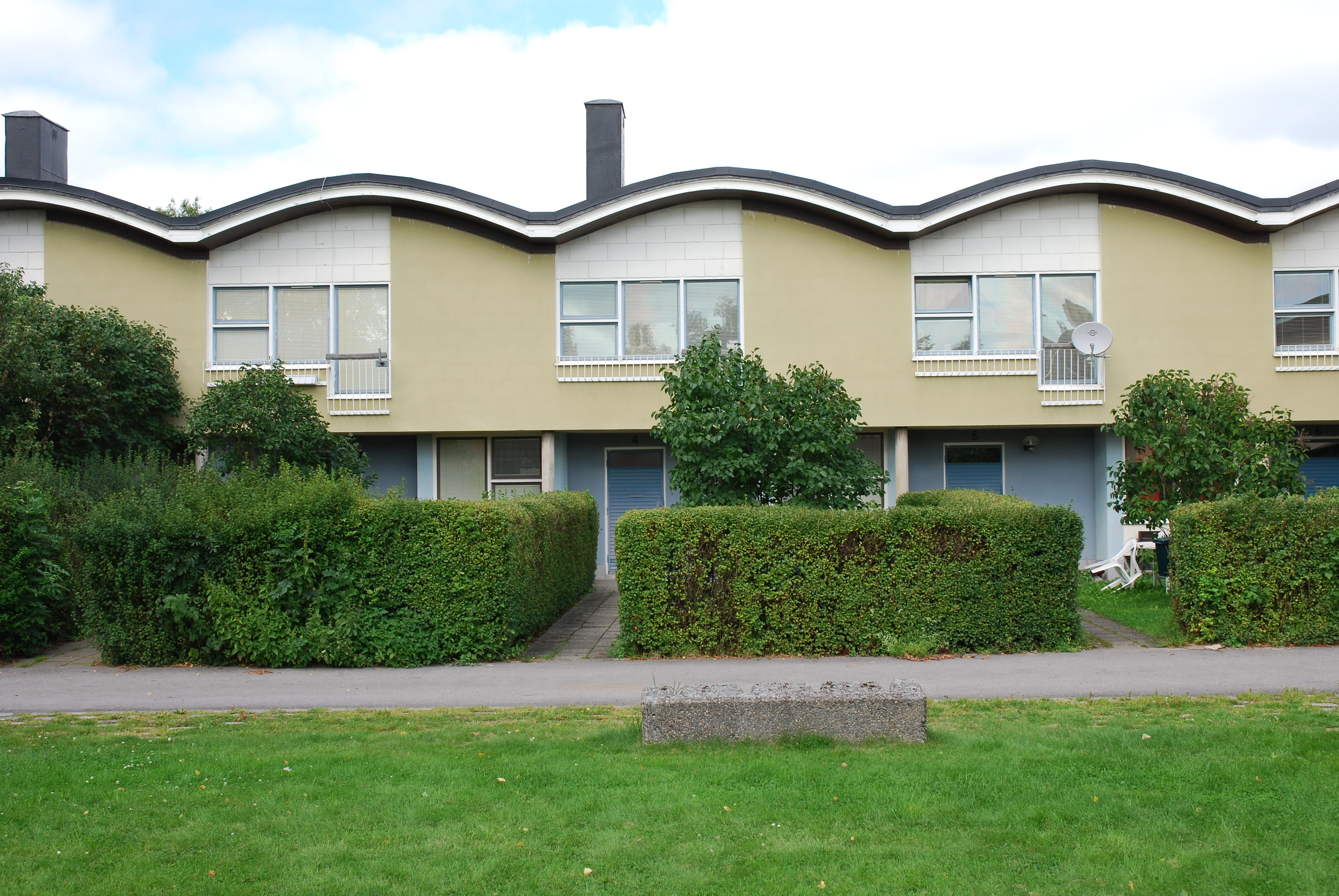
Terrace houses at Gyttorp, Nora, Sweden. Photo: Bengt Oberger

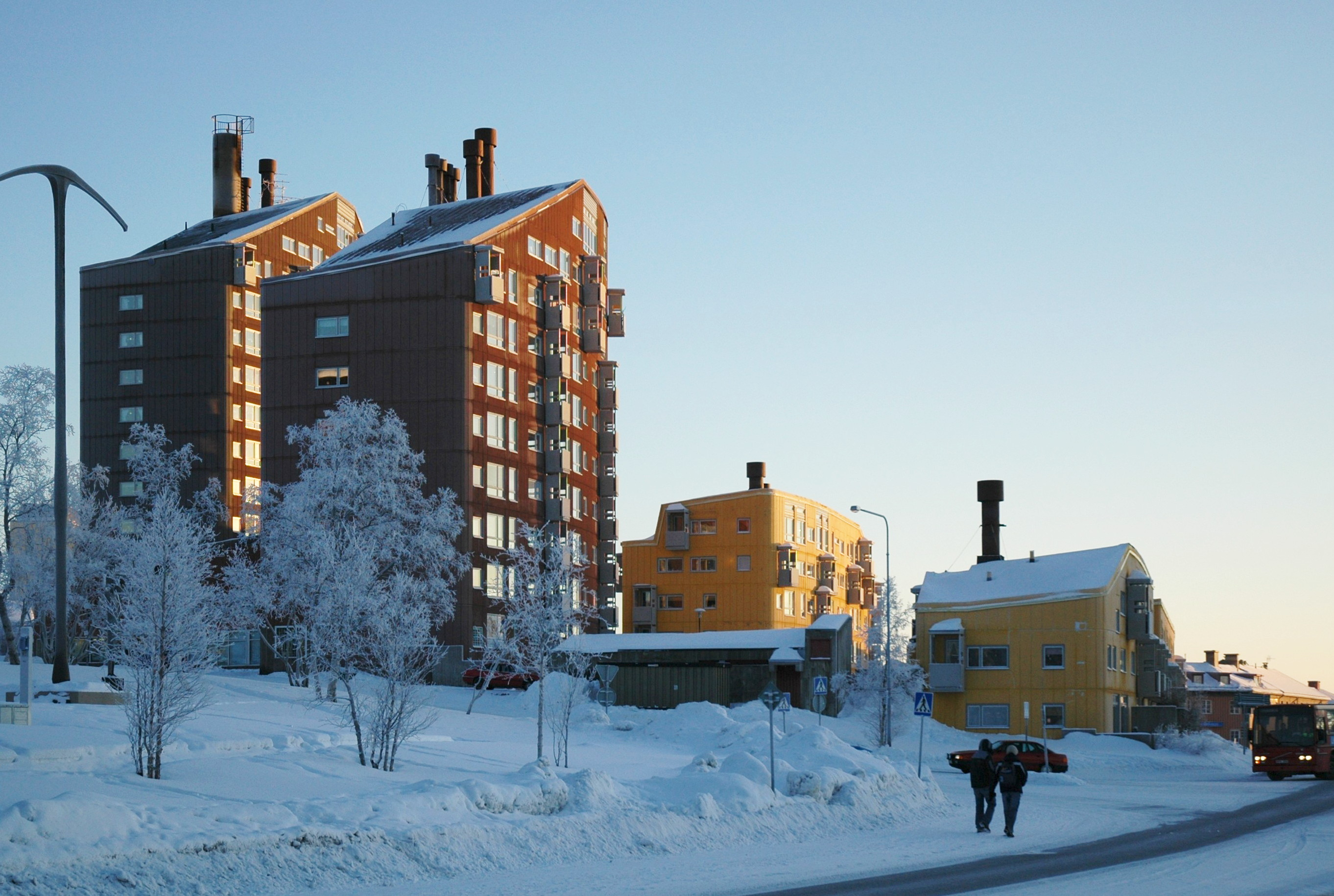
The Ortdrivaren buildings in Kiruna.

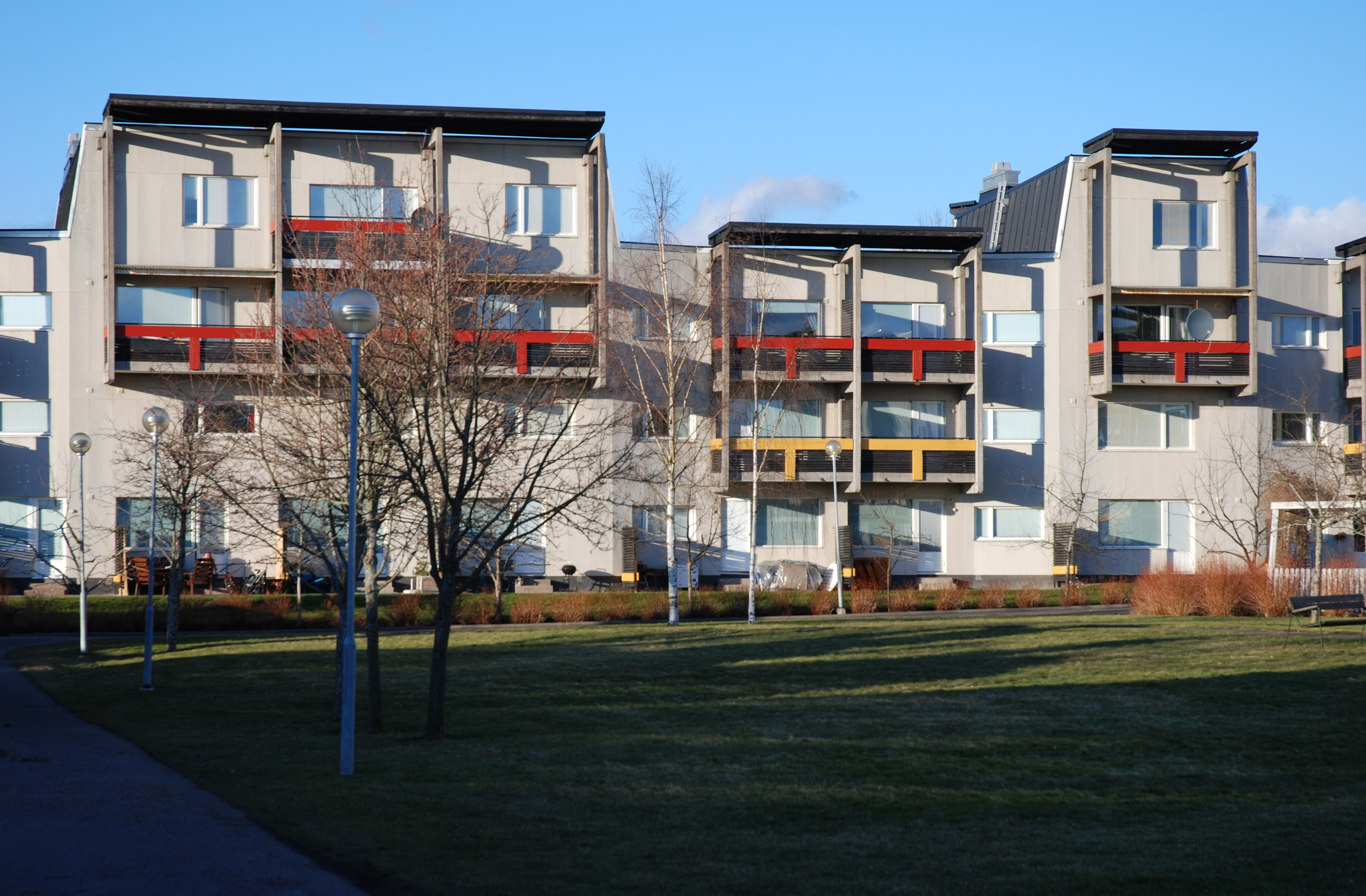
Residential area Brittgården at Tibro. Photo: Bengt Oberger

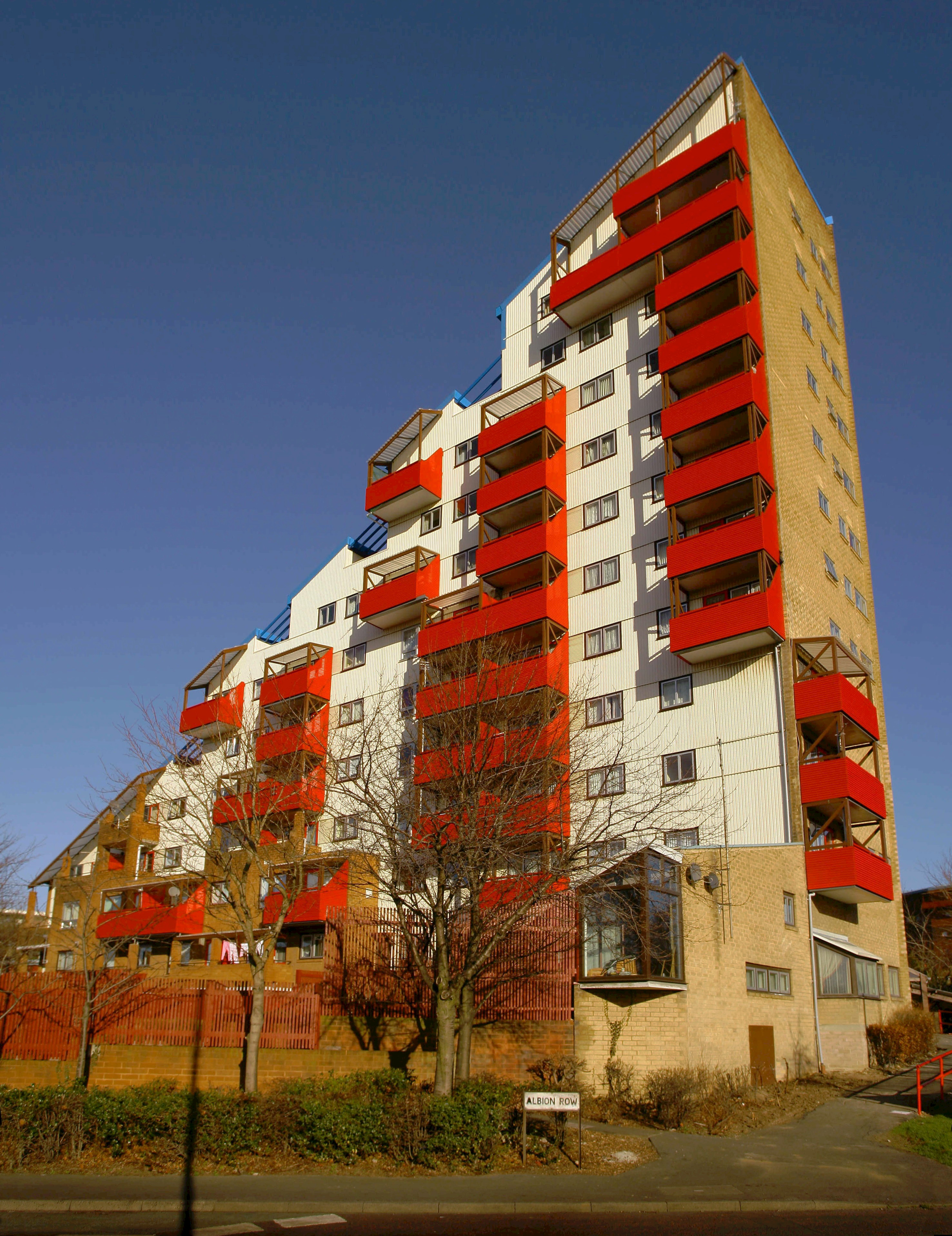
A portion of Newcastle's Byker Wall.

Erskine was born in London in 1914, and spent his childhood in Mill Hill in Barnet. His parents were socialists, adherents of the Fabian Society, which promoted the idea of the evolution of Britain into a socialist state.

His Scottish grandfather was a Presbyterian free church minister, a descendant of the ministers Ralph Erskine and Ebenezer Erskine, but his parents sent him to the Friends School Saffron Walden (1925–1931), a Quaker school, probably because of their socialist beliefs. There, he became committed to the Quaker ideals, which laid the foundation for his views on society, man's place in it, and on architecture.

== Education ==
During the 1930s, Erskine studied architecture for five years at the Regent Street Polytechnic, London under the direction of Thornton White. At the time, White's curriculum required the study of classical architecture before students were free to follow their own ideas. One of his fellow students was Gordon Cullen who would become a well-known architectural illustrator, urban designer, and theorist. Cullen advocated the improvement of urban settlements through an understanding and analysis of their picturesque qualities. This approach was profoundly influential on Erskine, who insisted in his work that the context and landscaping of his buildings be carefully integrated.

== Career ==
After qualifying as an architect, Erskine began work with the design team for Welwyn Garden City under the leadership of Louis de Soissons. He studied town planning and this interest broadened his approach to architecture, in particular, about how buildings related physically and socially to their setting. In 1936, he became an associate of the Royal Institute of British Architects.

Before the outbreak of World War II, Erskine travelled to Sweden. He was attracted by his admiration for the work of the Functionalist Swedish architects Gunnar Asplund, Sven Markelius, and Sigurd Lewerentz and by the country's adoption of the social welfare model. In Sweden, the political will was reflected in the national architecture, and these two factors coincided with his own humanist beliefs. He would go on to make an important contribution to the architectural landscape of both his adopted country and to that of England.

In Sweden, England, and Canada, he was responsible for the design of numerous innovative buildings reflecting his particular ideology. They include:

- Gyttorp, Nora Municipality, Sweden, 1945 to 1955, housing project for a factory town.
- Ski hotel at Borgafjäll (1948–50)
- Shopping, the first purpose-built enclosed shopping centre in the world in Luleå, Sweden opened in October 1955 in the small town of Luleå in the far north of Sweden. (By the above definition "Shopping" in Luleå was actually the first shopping centre in the world, and Southdale in Minnesota, United States came second in October 1956.)
- The Brittgården residential area at Tibro, Sweden, 1956 to 1959
- Svappavaara, Kiruna Municipality, Sweden, 1962, a housing project for a copper mine above the Arctic Circle (this project influenced the design of the northern town of Fermont, Quebec).
- Esperanza terraced housing area, Landskrona, Scania, Sweden, around 1968. Built up 1969-70.
- Clare Hall, University of Cambridge, Cambridge, 1969.
- Resolute, Nunavut
- Eaglestone grid square, at Milton Keynes, from 1972 to 1976.
- The Byker redevelopment, at Newcastle upon Tyne, from 1969 to 1982.
- The Nya Bruket area in Sandviken, Sweden, 1973 to 1978.
- The Stockholm University Library (opened in 1983), as well as several other buildings on the university campus including:
  - Aula Magna, the university's main auditorium
- Ekerö centrum (Tappström) in Ekerö Municipality outside Stockholm, 1983 to 1989.
- Vasaterminalen bus terminal in Stockholm, together with Bengt Ahlqvist and Anders Tengbom
- The London Ark, Hammersmith, London, 1990.
- Greenwich Millennium Village, London, from 2000 to 2005.

Erskine was best known in Great Britain for his Byker Wall housing scheme in Newcastle upon Tyne and The London Ark, a commercial project in Hammersmith, London. However, it was his attainment in designing the winning scheme in a 1997 competition to develop the Millennium Community at Greenwich (Greenwich Millennium Village), London, that brought his work to the attention of his fellow countrymen. This recognition came late in a long and productive career.

== Death and legacy ==
Upon his death in 2005, Councillor Peter Arnold, leader of Newcastle City Council, said of Erskine that he "was one of the twentieth century's greatest architects and in Newcastle's Byker estate he gave the city one of Europe's finest post Second World War new housing communities. His approach was so different from everything happening around that time as he put the focus on social regeneration and the interests of local people, rather than just bricks and mortar. He built Byker Wall Estate around the community.

Erskine founded his own company in Sweden in 1939. In 2000, he invited his long-time collaborator Johannes Tovatt into a partnership, naming the company Erskine Tovatt Arkitekter AB. It was included in Erskine's will, that upon his death, his name be removed from the company.

Erskine also received an Honorary Doctorate from Heriot-Watt University in 1982

In 1984, along with his wife, he established the Ruth and Ralph Erskine Nordic Foundation, endowed by proceeds from the Wolf Prize in Arts, which he was awarded that year. Beginning in 1988, the foundation has awarded a bi-annual prize of US$10,000 and a medal designed by Ralph Erskine, for any person, group, or organisation that "has contributed to the construction of buildings or community structures of innovative social, ecological and aesthetic character. The contribution must respect functional and economical aspects, and be to the advantage of the less privileged". In 2010, the award was given to Urban-Think Tank (Alfredo Brillembourg and Hubert Klumpner).

Erskine wrote the preface to the English translation of Jan Gehl's influential book Life Between Buildings, published in 1986. In 1987, he was awarded the RIBA Royal Gold Medal.

National Life Stories conducted in 1997, an oral history interview (C467/8) with Ralph Erskine for its Architects Lives' collection held by the British Library.

== Personal life ==
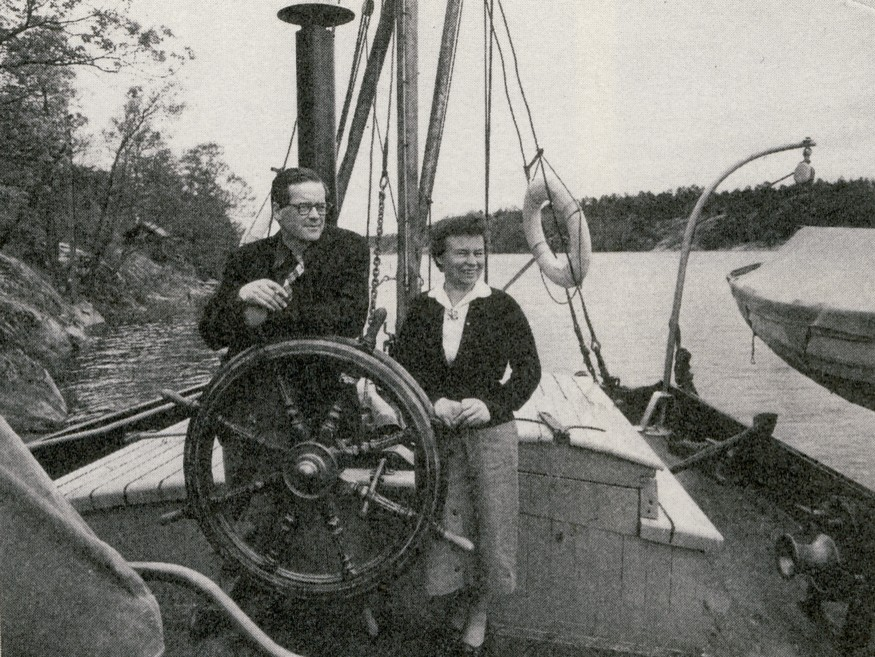
Ralph and Ruth Erskine in 1958

He met his wife Ruth at a Quaker school in Saffron Walden in the early 1930s. They were married in Stockholm in 1939 and had four children. Ruth died in 1988. He is survived by his children: Jane Kristina, Karin Elizabeth, Patrick Jon, and Suzanne.
