= RATS Theatre =

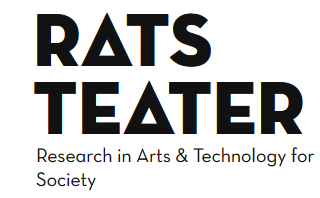

RATS Theatre – Research in Arts and Technology in Society was a theater at Stockholm University. It was established in 2008 by Rebecca Örtman. It was known for creating artistic digital productions on the web, mobile and public spaces as a tool of inspiration and a platform for dialogue between research and public. Its productions were met successfully in Sweden and internationally.

== History ==
RATS Theatre – Research in Arts and Technology in Society was established in 2008 by Rebecca Örtman as an association. The idea emerged when Rebecca was invited by Electrum Foundation to conduct a feasibility study about the need for a Science Theatre in Kista. The former name for RATS was Kista Theatre.

Ever since its inception in 2008, the theatre has worked in cooperation with the Stockholm University, Kista Science City AB and the municipality of the Kista/Rinkeby District. In 2013, the work with the Stockholm University was intensified. The objective is to promote interdisciplinary education between different institutions and art schools in order to further collaboration between artistic fields and research

RATS Theatre contributes to innovation and critical thinking in artistic development. In addition to that, many studies and research has been conducted to study how RATS Theatre create its interactive performances.

The productions of RATS Theatre aim to develop the use of information and communication technologies (ICT) in the artistic process and expression. RATS productions focus on public participation prior and during the production process. For RATS, interactive theatre and film is used as a tool to create inspiration and dialogue between research and community. . In addition to its productions, RATS conducts projects and workshops targeting children and youth in the suburbs of Stockholm. Artists, university students and professionals give artistic workshops to children and youth in drama, creative-writing, designing own digital games, film, photography, TV production. In 2019, Rats theater had its last production in Husby with Upproret poet by Rebecca Örtman and Jila Mossaed, Stockholm City Theater opened a stage in the area and it was not possible to compete with a theater institution. RATS Teater is closing down its operations and Rebecca Örtman is starting a new digital stage called Dramaqueen 2020

== RATS theatre productions and co-productions ==
- Nere på Jorden (2009) of Lena Andersson, co-production of RATS Theatre and Örebro länsteater.
- Lise and Otto (2012): The story of the scientists Lise Meitner and Otto Hahn. The audience sat in both the Royal Dramatic Theatre and The Husby Hit simultaneously using Fiber technology. A production of RATS Theatre. Supported by the Swedish Art Council.
- Ada (2013): a drama about Ada Byron, the first programmer living in the 1830s, which was broadcast live to mobile phones, the web and the big screen with interaction opportunities for the audience to participate through Twitter, sms. A Production of RATS Theatre- Supported by Arts Foundation Postkodslotteriet, Bahnhof AB, Stokab AB and the management of culture Stockholm city.
- Maryam (2013): An interactive drama for the mobile phone APP about Maryam Al Lihlja, who developed the astrolabe that could measure time, place and position in the 10th century. A coproduction of RATS Theatre and Dramaten the Royal Dramatic Theatre in Sweden. Directed by Rebecca Forsberg, digital scenography by Peter Hagdahl.
- On My Street (2013): RATS Theatre interactive show with audience participation inserted via Twitter and SMS. Written and directed by Rebecca Örtman, music by Stockholms Solister led by Maria Eklund. Supported by the Culture Department of the City of Stockholm.
- Haimon (2014): Interactive film in Mobile Application about the riots in Husby 2013. A Production of RATS Theatre by Rebecca Örtman. Supported by Stockholm city.
- Antropocen (2015): The art of creating trust about the climate and environment. A coproduction RATS with Dramaten the Royal Dramatic Theatre.
- LIV (2015–2016): An interactive film about dance, friendship and religion. A production of RATS Theatre and Stella Nova AB. Supported by the Swedish Film Institute.
- EXIL (2016): An interactive audio-journey with poem from Exile using Mobile Application and Ibeacons. Supported by the Swedish Arts Council.
- spegla mig by Rebecca Örtman Rats Teater and Riksteatern Sweden 2018 https://www.riksteatern.se/forestallningar/spegla-mig/
- Upprorets poet by Rebecca Örtman and Jila Mossaed / Göteborgs stadsteater 2018, in Husby 2019 http://www.stadsteatern.goteborg.se/pa-scen/2018-2019/upprorets-poet/
