= Lucas Gottzén =

Swedish social scientist (born 1977)

Professor Lucas Gottzén
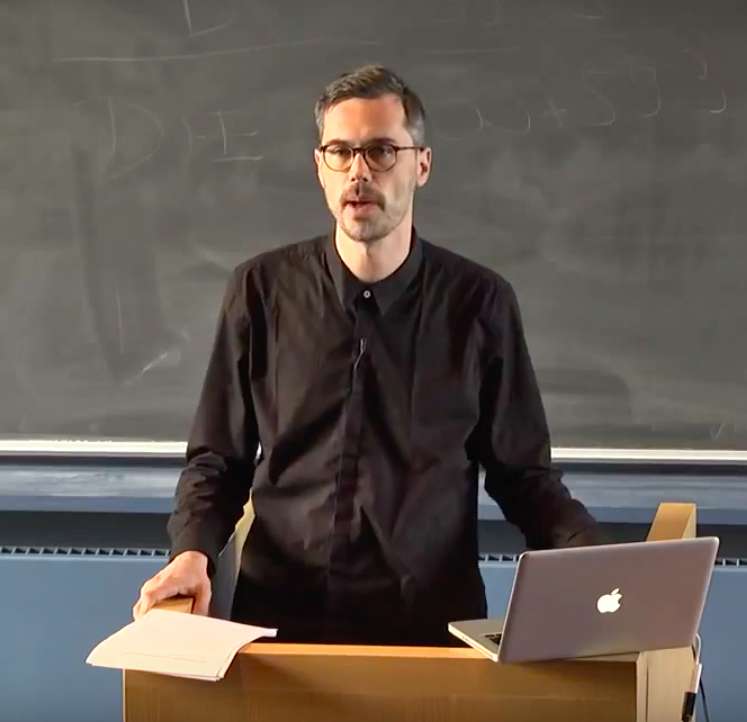
- Born: Lucas Forsberg; 8 November 1977 (age 48)

Academic work
- Discipline: Men's studies
- Institutions: Stockholm University

Lucas Martin Gottzén (born 8 November 1977), formerly Lucas Forsberg, is a Swedish social scientist and an expert on men's studies and violence. He is full Professor of Child and Youth Studies at Stockholm University. He was editor-in-chief of the men's studies journal Norma from 2014 to 2018; he was also editor of the child and youth studies journal Locus 2009–2010, and was editor of the Routledge International Handbook of Masculinity Studies. He is particularly noted for his research on the relation between the perception of masculinity and physical and sexual violence, and is a frequent commentator in the media in Scandinavia on men and violence.

Gottzén earned a BA in history at Linköping University in 2001, an MA in journalism at Stockholm University in 2003 and a PhD in child studies at Linköping University in 2009. He was appointed as senior lecturer at the Department of Child and Youth Studies at Stockholm University in 2009, was appointed as docent (reader) in social work at Linköping University in 2013, and was promoted to full Professor of Child and Youth Studies at Stockholm University in 2017. In 2014 he became editor-in-chief of the journal Norma.

== Selected books ==
- Men, Masculinities and Intimate Partner Violence, London, Routledge, 2020, with Margunn Bjørnholt and Floretta Boonzaier
- Routledge International Handbook of Masculinity Studies, London, Routledge, 2020, with Ulf Mellström and Tamara Shefer
- Genus, with Mia Eriksson, Liber, 2020
- Av det känsligare slaget: Män och våld mot kvinnor, Göteborg, Makadam, 2019
- Sociologins teoretiker, Malmö, Gleerups, 2014
- Hjältar och monster: Samhällsvetenskapliga perspektiv på män och våld, Stockholm, Ungdomsstyrelsen, 2013
- Andra män. Maskulinitet, normskapande och jämställdhet, Malmö, Gleerups, 2012
- Involved Parenthood: Everyday Lives of Swedish Middle-Class Families, Linköping, 2009
