= Aula Magna (Stockholm University) =

Coordinates: 59.36391°N 18.05648°E

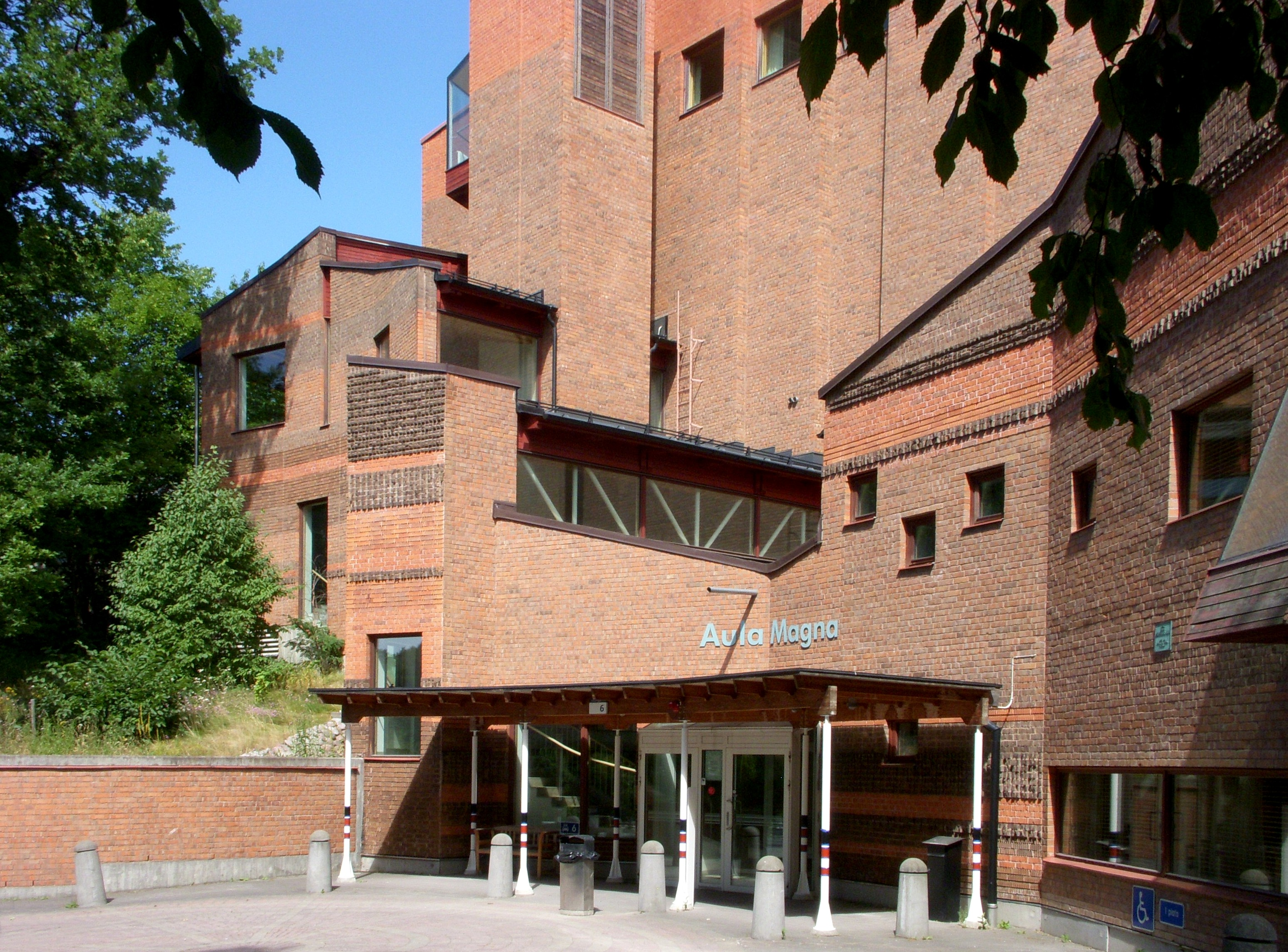
South facade of the Aula Magna

Aula Magna is the largest auditorium at Stockholm University in Sweden, completed in 1998. In addition to the large lecture hall there are smaller meeting and seminar rooms. Outside the lecture hall there is a gallery for reading. The auditorium is used for academic gatherings such as conferences and symposium as well as external functions such as general meetings. Nobel lectures have also been held here.

== Architect ==
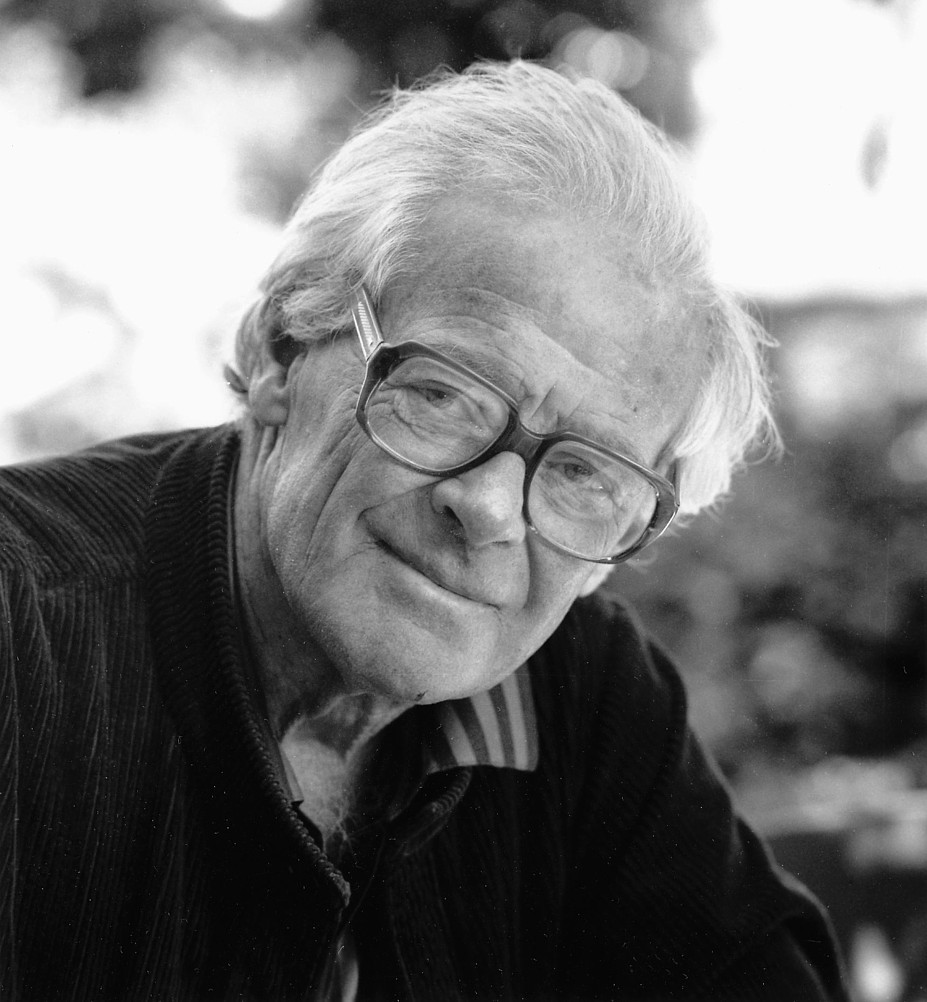
Ralph Erskine

Aula Magna was designed by architect Ralph Erskine, who also designed the nearby Allhuset, Stockholm University Library, Aktiverum (Frescatihallen), and the House of Laws for the University. Aula Magna was the last project by Erskine for the university before his death in 2005. The idea of placing an auditorium on the site dates from when the campus was planned in the early 1960s.

== Design ==
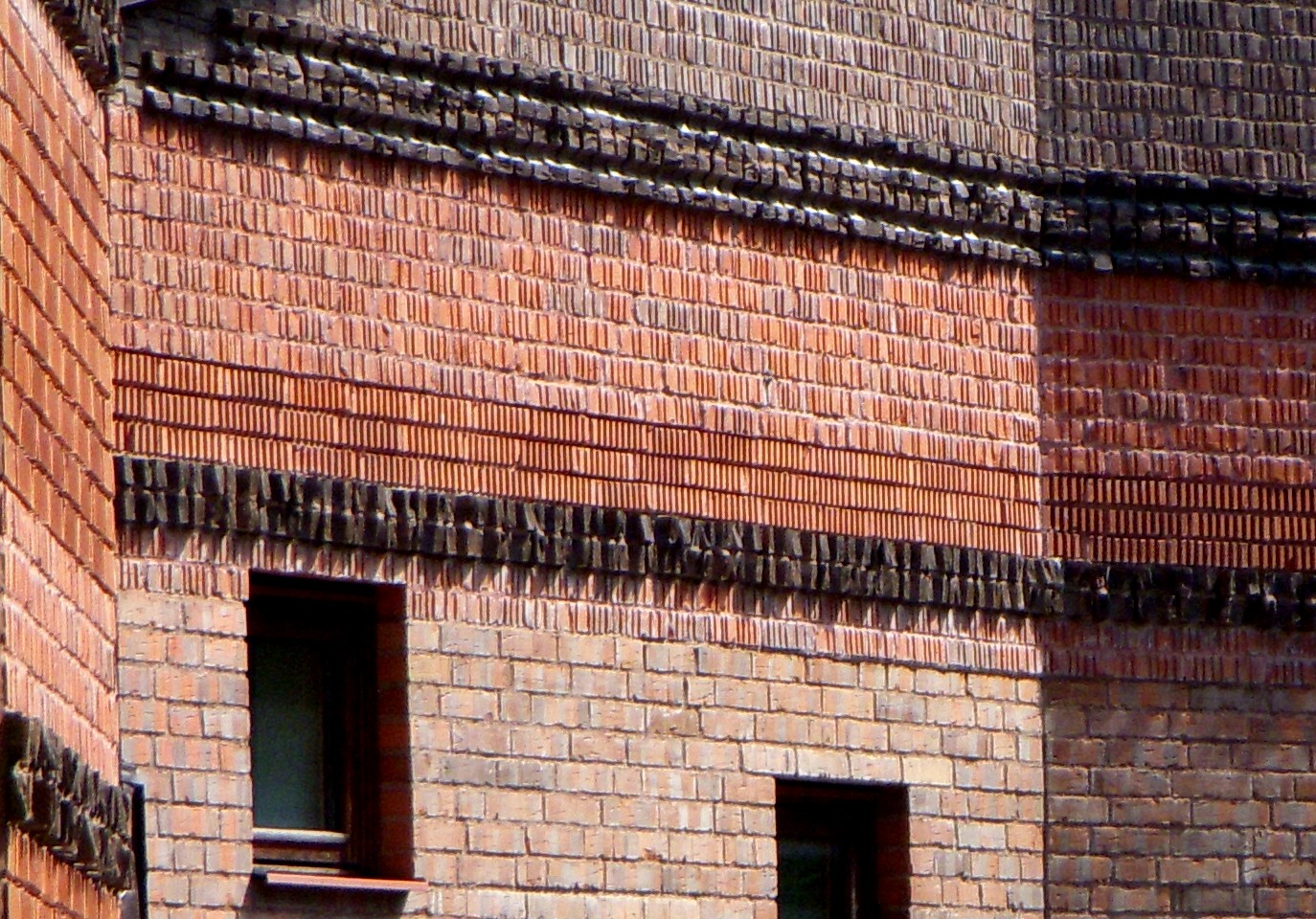
Brick detailing, south facade

The building is built into the ground. From the north side and the main entrance it gives a low, modest impression, dominated by large glass surfaces. On the south side, the building is at its full height. Erskine breaks up the facade into many volumes of different size, structure and height in and interesting arrangement. The north facade is faced in brick in different shades of red brick, highly articulated with different surface textures. The roof, visible from a distance, features sun reflectors, typical of Erskine's style, which transmit daylight into the auditorium via skylights. The interior offers a vast panorama through the glass facade to the north which places the viewer in close contact with nature and the old oaks outside. Inside, the patterned brick walls return. The interior design has a natural feel through exposed bedrock in the lower foyer. The rustic lining of blonde woods is a characteristic feature throughout the building, presenting a warm contrast to the glass and stone.

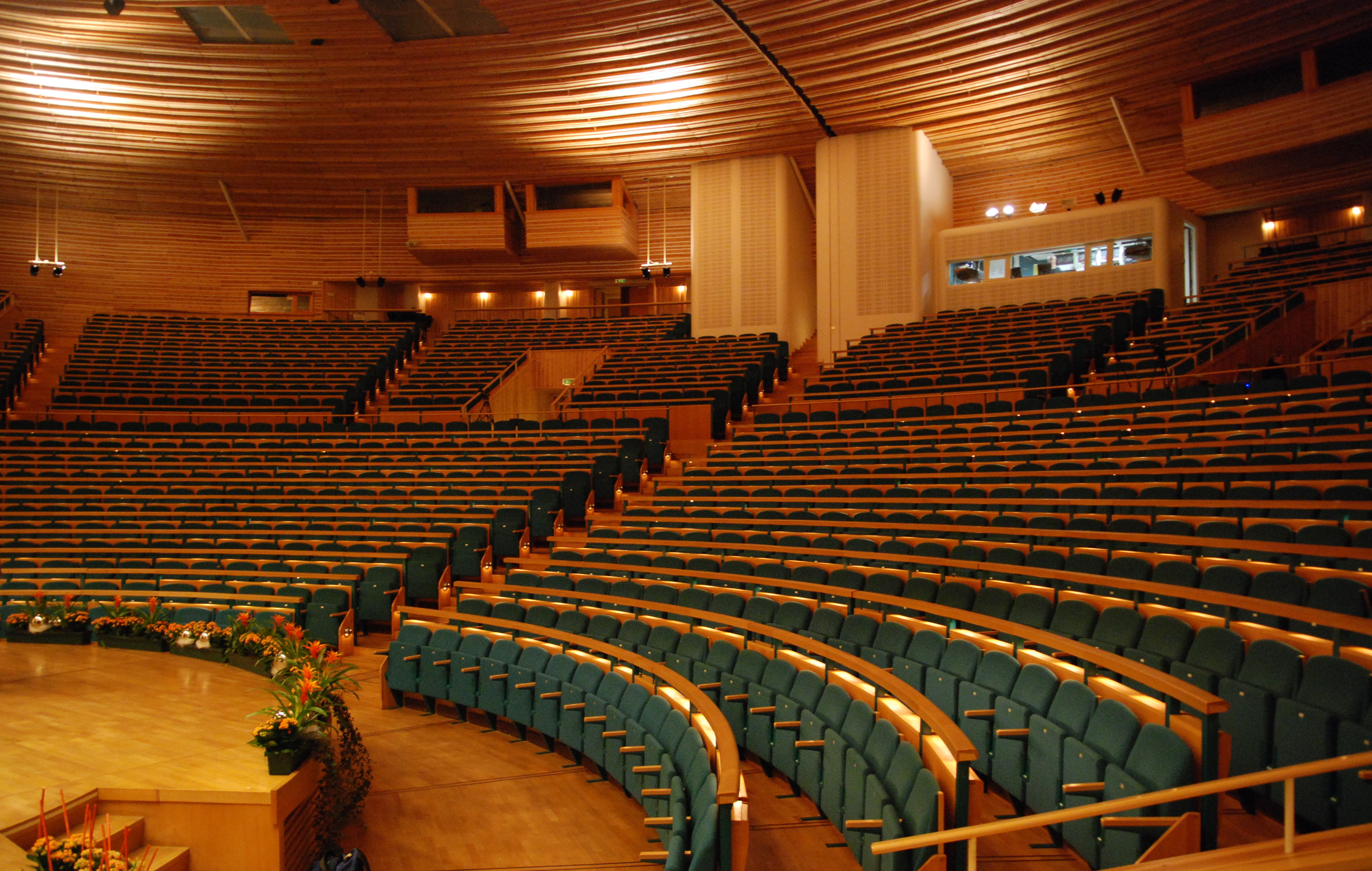
Auditorium

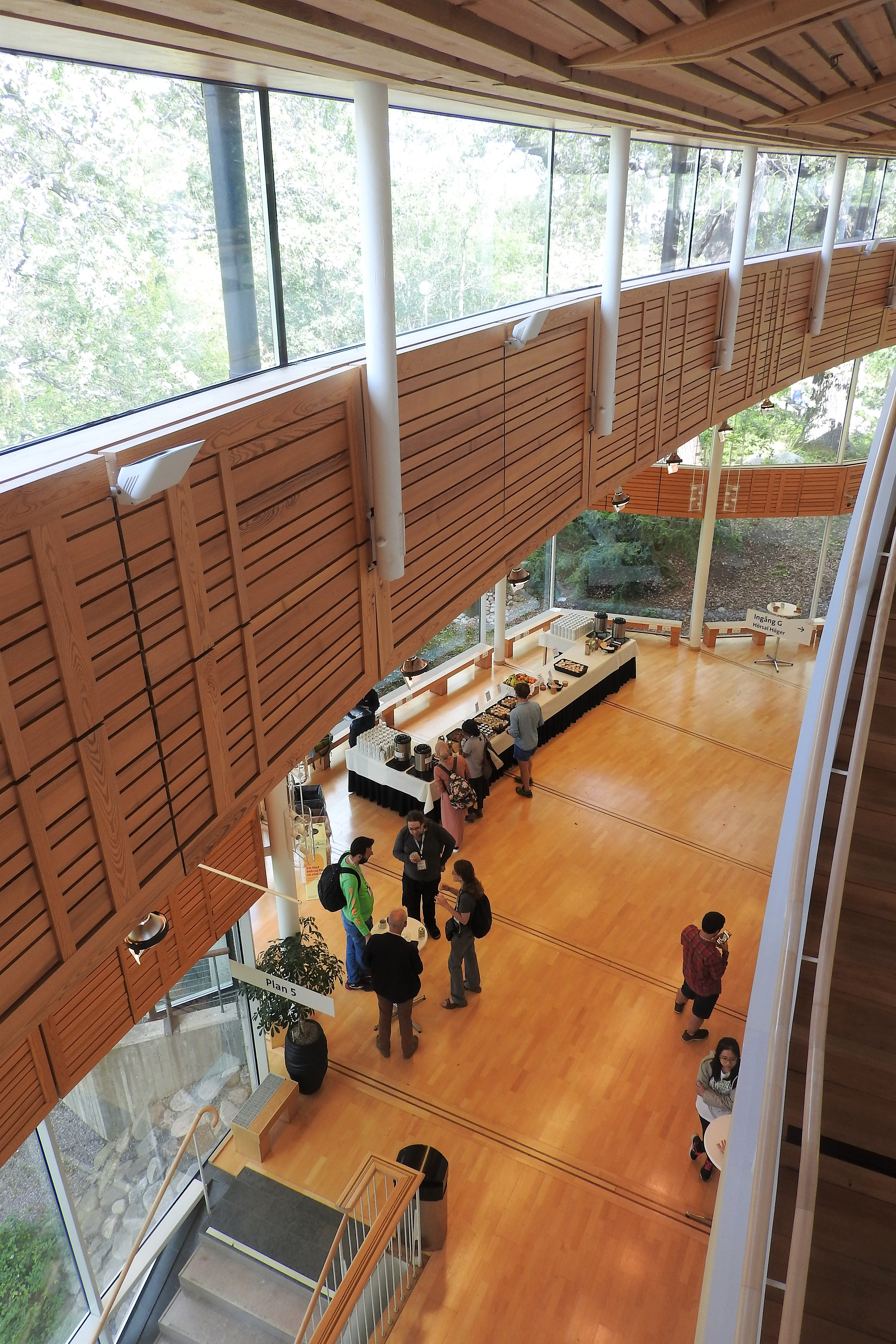
Lobby

The design of the auditorium was inspired by the semi-circular plan of an ancient amphitheater. This is intended to allow the audience of 1,194 to perceive the speaker without electronic amplification. For this purpose, Erskine worked with the acoustic consultant Nils-Åke Nilsson. The wood ceiling has a steep slope towards the stage and powerful profiling to maximize the spread of the sound and avoid echoes. These solutions were also meant to provide an aesthetic sculptural effect. To achieve maximum sound diffusion, a steep slope was integrated into the design and care was taken to shape space and materials.

The main space can be divided into 2 parts in its middle via mobile wall blocks.

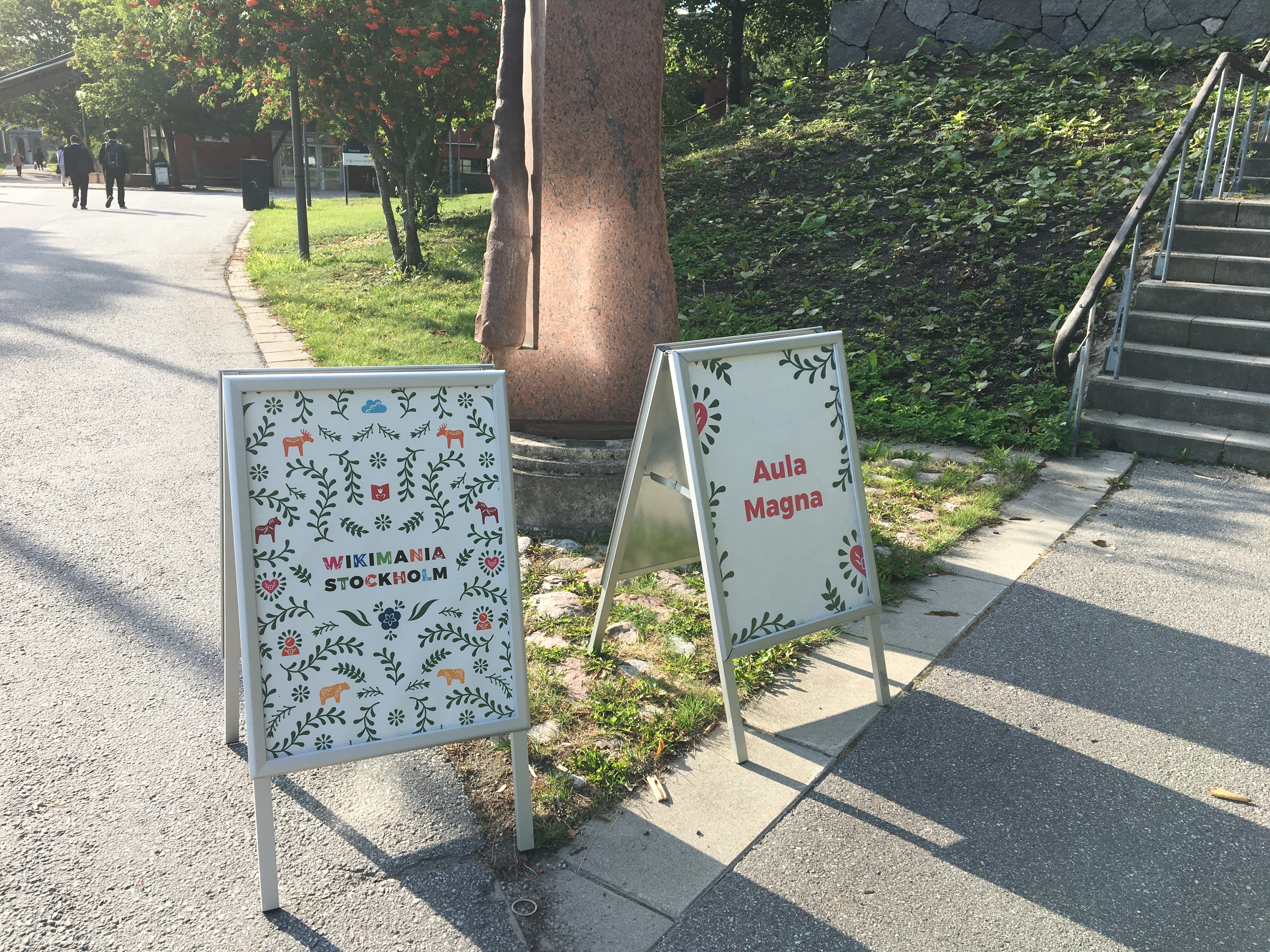
Entrance signages from Wikimania 2019

== Sources ==
- Hultin, Olof; Österling, Ola; Perlmutter, Michael (2002) [1998]. Guide till Stockholms Arkitektur (Guide to Stockholm's architecture, 2nd edition). Stockholm: Architecture Publishers. Libris 8465772. ISBN 91-86050-58-3
- Erskine, Ralph; (1998) "Aula Magna, Stockholm", Architecture, No. 1 Stockholm
- Egelius, Mats, (1998) "Aula Magna closes the circle", Architecture, No. 1, Stockholm
