= Anna-Britta Hellbom =

Swedish anthropologist and Americanist (1919–2004)

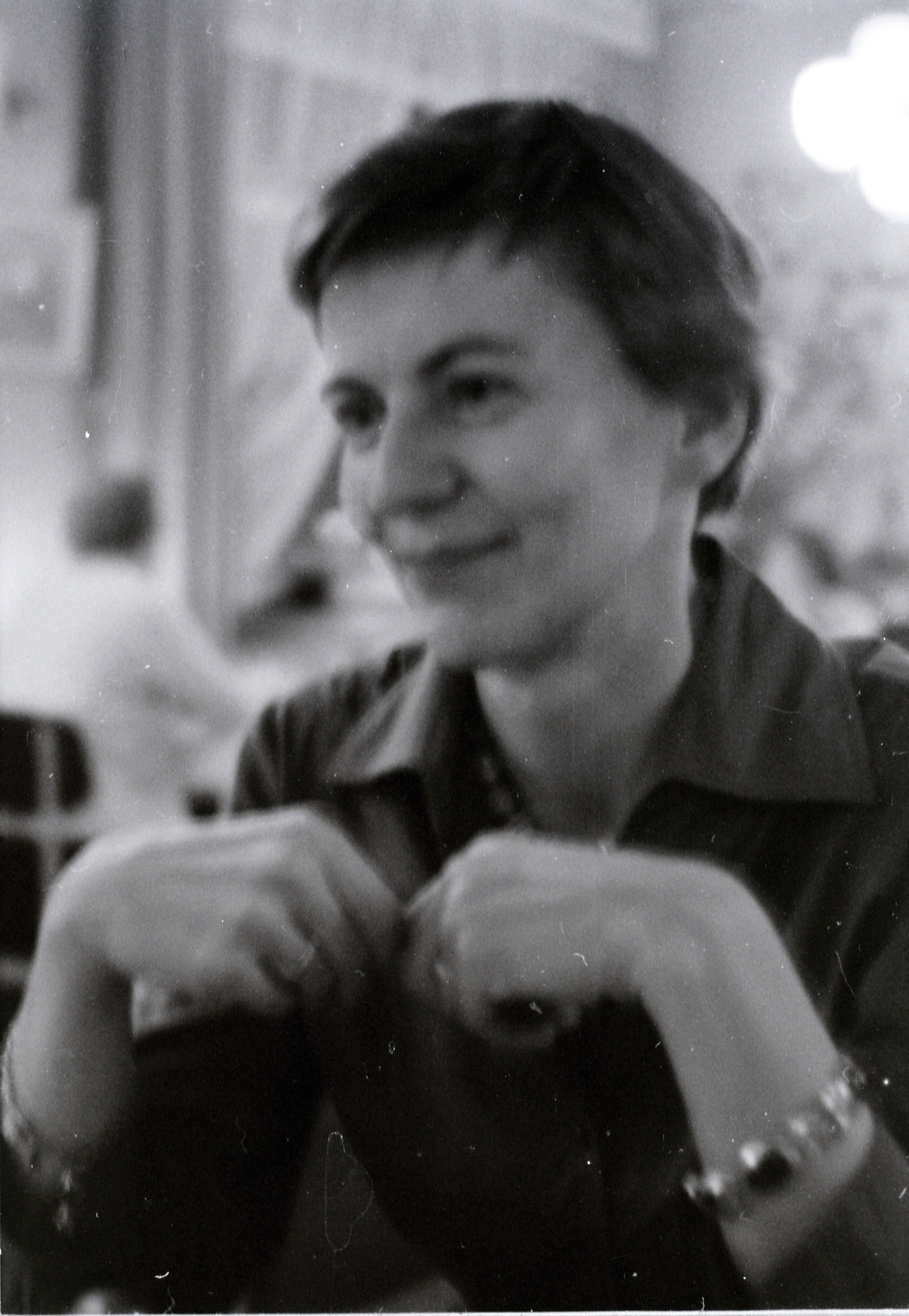
Anna-Britta Hellbom

Anna-Britta Hellbom (25 July 1919 – 22 December 2004) was a Swedish anthropologist and Americanist. She is known for her ethnographic fieldworks in Mesoamerica in Mexico.

== Biography ==
Born on 25 July 1919 in Uppsala, Sweden, Anna-Britta Hellbom started her university studies in Nordic ethnology but later changed to social anthropology. She graduated from the Stockholm University in 1940. She also studied in Madrid, where she learned Spanish, which helped in her career as an Americanist.

After her ethnographic fieldwork in Mexico (1962–1963), she received her PhD from the Stockholm University in 1967. She wrote her doctoral thesis on La Participacion Cultural de las Mujeres Indias y Mestizas en el Mexico PreCortesiano y Postrevulcionario.

In the mid-1960s, she started her professional career at the Museum of Ethnography in Stockholm. In 1967, she became the Americanist curator of the ethnographical museum in charge of the collections from the Americas, a position she held until her retirement in 1985.

She was influenced by the work of her teacher, Sigvald Linné (1899–1986), a Swedish archeologist and ethnographer, known for his excavations at Teotihuacan, an ancient Mesoamerican city, Mexico.

She extensively wrote on the role of women in Mexico based on her ethnographic fieldwork in Aztec culture.

The Ethnographic Museum in Stockholm houses several collections from her fieldwork.

She died in Oscar Parish, Stockholm on 22 December 2004.
