= Floretta Boonzaier =

South African psychologist

Floretta Avril Boonzaier
- Born: South Africa
- Education: University of Cape Town
- Scientific career
- Fields: Psychology
- Workplaces: University of Cape Town

Floretta Avril Boonzaier is a South African psychologist and Professor of Psychology at the University of Cape Town. She is noted for her work in feminist, critical and postcolonial psychologies, subjectivity in relation to race, gender and sexuality, and gender-based violence, and qualitative psychologies, especially narrative, discursive and participatory methods. She heads the Hub for Decolonial Feminist Psychologies in Africa with Shose Kessi.

== Career ==
She obtained a PhD in psychology with a dissertation that focused on the construction of subjectivities in relation to violence in intimate heterosexual relationships at the University of Cape Town in 2005. She has since been employed at the Department of Psychology at the University of Cape Town as a lecturer, senior lecturer, associate professor and from 2018 as a full professor (chair). She was a Mandela Fellow at the W. E. B. Du Bois Institute at Harvard University from 2009 to 2010.

She is one of the leaders of the Black Academic Caucus at the University of Cape Town and has been involved in South African debates on rape culture and the Rhodes Must Fall debate. She is also a member of the board of directors of the NGO Resources Aimed at the Prevention of Child Abuse and Neglect.

== Awards ==
She received the South African Women in Science Award from the Department of Science and Technology in 2010. In 2019 she received the UCT Advancing Womxn Award. She is a recipient of the Harvard-Mandela Fellowship and the Shiela Biddle Ford Foundation Fellowship at the Hutchins Center for African and African American Research.

== Publications ==
- Pan-Africanism and Psychology in Decolonial times, with Shose Kessi and Babette Gekeler (2021)
- Men, Masculinities and Intimate Partner Violence, with Lucas Gottzén and Margunn Bjørnholt (Routledge, 2021)
- Decolonial Feminist Community Psychology, with Taryn van Niekerk (Springer, 2019)
- Engaging Youth in Activism, Research and Pedagogical Praxis: Transnational and Intersectional Perspectives on Gender, Sex, and Race, with Jeff Hearn, Kopano Ratele and Tamara Shefer (Routledge, 2018)
- South African Women Living with HIV: Global Lessons from Local Voices (Indiana University Press, 2013)
- The Gender of Psychology (Juta Academic, 2006)
