= Stockholm University =

State university of Stockholm, Sweden

- Stockholms universitet
- Type: Public university
- Established: 1878; 148 years ago 1960; 66 years ago as University status
- Affiliations: EUA; UNICA
- Rector: Hans Adolfsson
- Academic staff: 5,500 (2018)
- Students: 33,000 individuals, 26,273 (FTE) (2018)
- Doctoral students: 1,600 (2018)
- Location: Stockholm, Sweden; 59°21′55″N 18°03′30″E
- Campus: Urban
- Colors: Stockholm university blue, gold, silver
- Website: www.su.se/english www.su.se

Stockholm University (SU) (Swedish: Stockholms universitet) is a public research university in Stockholm, Sweden, founded as a college in 1878, with university status since 1960. With over 33,000 students at four different faculties: law, humanities, social sciences, and natural sciences, it is one of the largest universities in Scandinavia.

Stockholm University was granted university status in 1960, making it the fourth oldest Swedish university. As with other public universities in Sweden, Stockholm University's mission includes teaching and research anchored in society at large.

== History ==
The initiative for the formation of Stockholm University was taken by the Stockholm City Council. The process was completed after a decision in December 1865 regarding the establishment of a fund and a committee to "establish a higher education institution in the capital". The nine members of the committee were respected and prominent citizens whose work had helped the evolution of science and society.

The next important step was taken in October 1869, when the Stockholm University College Association was established. Several members of the committee became members of the association – including Professor Pehr Henrik Malmsten. The association's mission was to establish a college in Stockholm and would "not be dissolved until the college came into being and its future could be considered secure." The memorandum of the Stockholm University College was adopted in May 1877, and in the autumn semester of the following year, actual operations began.

In 1878, the university college Stockholms högskola started its operations with a series of lectures on natural sciences, open to curious citizens (a tradition still upheld by yearly publicly open lectures). Notable in the university's early history is the appointment of Sofia Kovalevskaya as Ordinary Professor (full professor) in mathematics, making her the first woman in Europe in modern times to hold such a position. In 1904 the college became an official degree-granting institution.

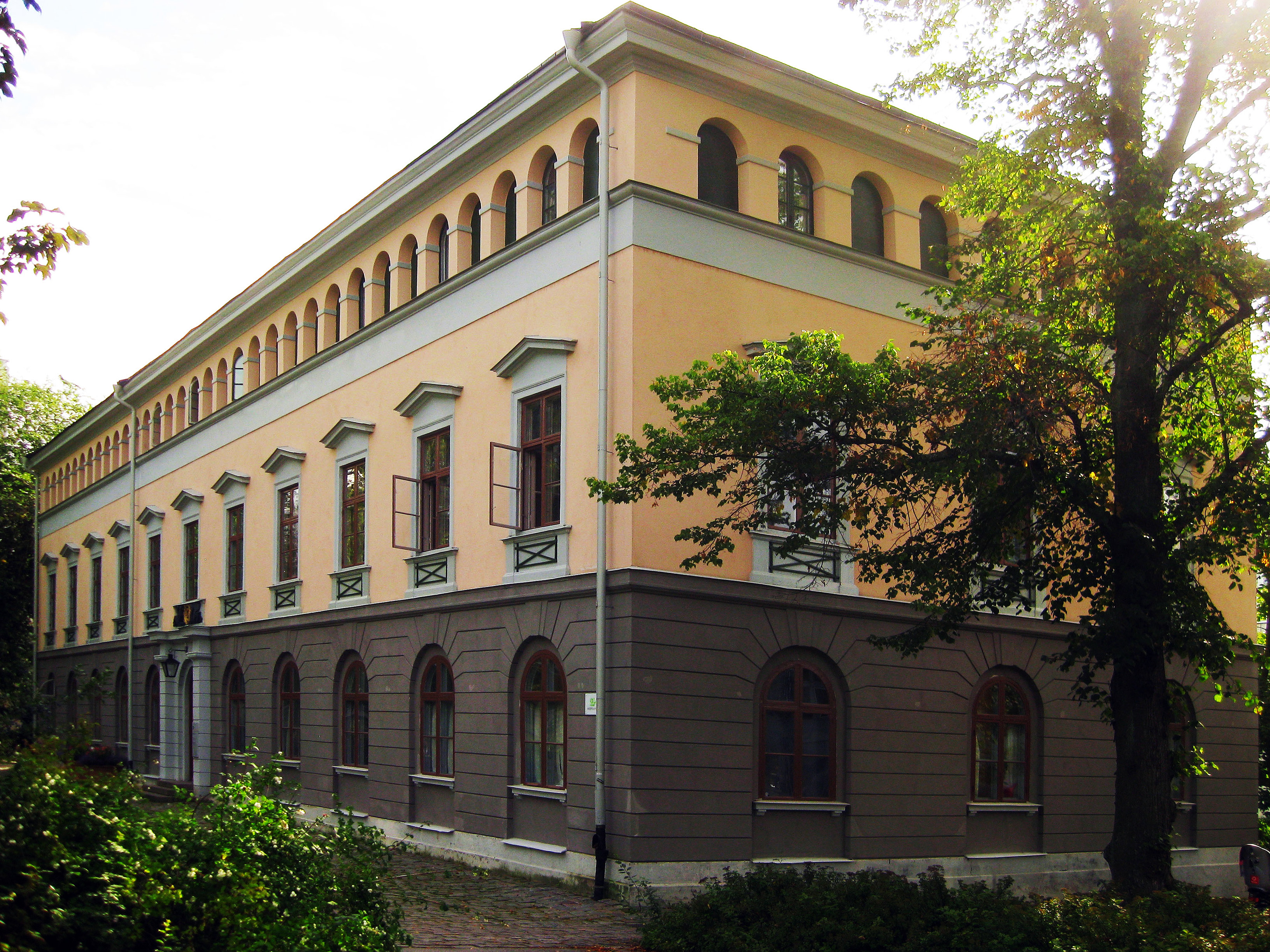
Fredrik Blom's house at Experimentalfältet, now used for the central administration of Stockholm University

In 1960, the college was granted university status, becoming Sweden's fourth state university. The university premises were situated in central Stockholm at Observatorielunden but increased enrollment resulted in a lack of space, which required the university campus to be shifted to a bigger facility. Since 1970 most of the university operations are located at the main campus at Frescati north of the city center, the former Experimentalfältet, previously used by the Royal Swedish Academy of Agriculture and Forestry.

== Organisation ==
Stockholm University is a state agency and is governed by decisions taken by the government and parliament. The university has the right, within the limits the government provides, to decide on many issues such as their internal organization, educational provision and the admission of students.

=== Intra-university bodies ===
- The University Board is the university's highest governing body. The board is responsible for the university's mission as a government agency and for following the requirements of laws and regulations. The board reports to the government. It consists of eight external members (including the chairman and vice-chairman), four business representatives from the university with two group deputies and three student representatives (one graduate student representative) with one deputy. The University Board is above the rector who is the head of the agency and has operational responsibility for all operations. The rector has a pro rector to replace him/her if necessary.
- There are two area boards at the university, the Area board of science and the Area board of humanities, law and social sciences. They are headed by a vice rector. The area boards are responsible for strategic planning of education and research, coordination of faculty teaching, research and internal and external collaboration.
- After the area boards, the faculty boards are the highest decision-making bodies at the faculty level. The faculty boards consists of the dean, the assistant dean, other business representatives and student representatives. The deans are appointed by the president after proposal by choice within the faculty.
- After faculties, decisions are taken at the departmental level, where each department has a department head who manages and makes decisions together with the departmental board.
- The University administration is the preparation and service organization for the University Board, rector and other decision-making bodies, and it is led by the executive director. The university administration has a number of units, for example, finance department, IT department, HR department and the student section. There are also units for strategy, planning and communications.
- The Executive Director is the most senior official at Stockholm University and decides on matters including the university administration's organization and finances.

=== International collaboration ===
The university is an active member of the University of the Arctic. UArctic is an international cooperative network based in the Circumpolar Arctic region, consisting of more than 200 universities, colleges, and other organizations with an interest in promoting education and research in the Arctic region.

The university also participates in UArctic's mobility program north2north. The aim of that program is to enable students of member institutions to study in different parts of the North.

== Departments, institutes and centers ==
Education and research at Stockholm University is carried out within the natural sciences and the humanities/social sciences. Within these fields, there are four faculties with 56 departments, institutes and centers within the humanities, law, natural sciences and social sciences. Research and training also takes place at a number of centers and institutes with a separate governing board, but that organisationally belong to a department.

== Courses and programmes ==
Stockholm University offers courses at both undergraduate and advanced level. There are 190 study programmes in total, including 75 master's programmes taught in English, and 1,700 courses to choose from within human science and science. Students can choose between studying one or more free-standing courses, that each may last between five weeks and one semester, or apply for a full study programme. Stockholm university offers 4 Bachelor Programmes taught in English, which are the Bachelor´s Programme in Business, Ethics and Sustainability; Bachelor Programme in Latin America Studies; Bachelor´s Programme in International Business and Politics and the Bachelor´s Programme in Earth Science, Distance Learning.

Besides the programmes themselves, the university also offers opportunities for foreign exchange studies during the third year of a bachelor's degree programme. The university has cooperative agreements with more than 100 universities worldwide.

== Research ==
The university's researchers engage in governmental investigations, are active in the media, provide responses to proposed legislation and are included in several Nobel committees and international expert bodies.

== Field stations ==
Askö Laboratory

Stockholm University Marine Research center (SMF) provides "Askö Laboratory", where Research on ecosystems, ecology and the impact of human interference is carried out. The field station was built in 1961 by Professor Lars Silén, Head of the Department of Zoology, and is now established as a renowned marine research center.

Tarfala

Tarfala research station belongs to the Department of Physical Geography. The station is located 1135 meters above sea level in Tarfaladalen, on the east side of Kebnekaise in arctic / alpine surroundings and conducts glaciological, hydrological, meteorological and climatological research. The station has the capacity to accommodate groups of up to 25 people and the staff consists of 2–5 people.

Tovetorp

Tovetorp Zoological Research Station belongs to the Department of Zoology, and is located about 95 km southwest of Stockholm. It conducts research and training activities in ecology and ethology. Every year Tovetorp is visited by up to 600 students who live and study between 2–10 days on the station. On the research side, over 20 people work today with different research projects. The number of employees are currently 6 people.

== Student unions ==
Prior to 2008, Stockholm University had only one student union called Stockholm University Student Union (Stockholm universitets studentkår, SUS). However, since 2008 the computer and system science students and the teacher students have their own, independent, student unions called DISK and "The Teacher's College's Student Union" (Lärarhögskolans studentkår). The law students also have their own student union, as do journalism students (Studentkåren vid JMK).

The future of the Teacher's College's Student Union is however not entirely safe, as Stockholm University's Student Union has declared it will begin talks with the Teacher's College's Student Union on transferring its members to it, as it already has a teacher's division. In contrast to common belief, DISK is not an abbreviation.

== Rankings ==
University rankings

Global – Overall
- ARWU World: =100 (2025)
- QS World: =147 (2026)
- THE World: =191 (2025)
- USNWR Global: =153 (2025)

In the Academic Ranking of World Universities 2020, an annual publication of university rankings by Shanghai Ranking Consultancy/Academic Ranking of World Universities, Stockholm University was placed as the 69th overall best university worldwide.

The Times Higher Education (THE) World University Rankings 2018 listed Stockholm University at position 134 on the list of the world's top universities. Times Higher Education World University Rankings are annual university rankings published by British Times Higher Education (THE) magazine.

In the QS World University Rankings, Stockholm University was ranked 148 overall in the world in 2021. Its subject rankings were: 23rd in Environmental Sciences, 37th in Sociology, 98th in Natural Sciences, 132nd in Arts & Humanities, 238th in Life Sciences & Medicine, 297th in Engineering and Technology, and 175th in Social Sciences and Management.

In the U.S. News & World Report Rankings, Stockholm University was ranked 114 overall in the world in 2021, 4 in Sweden and 43 within Europe.

In the CWTS Leiden Ranking 2022, Stockholm University was placed at 343 on the list of universities in the world.

== Campus ==
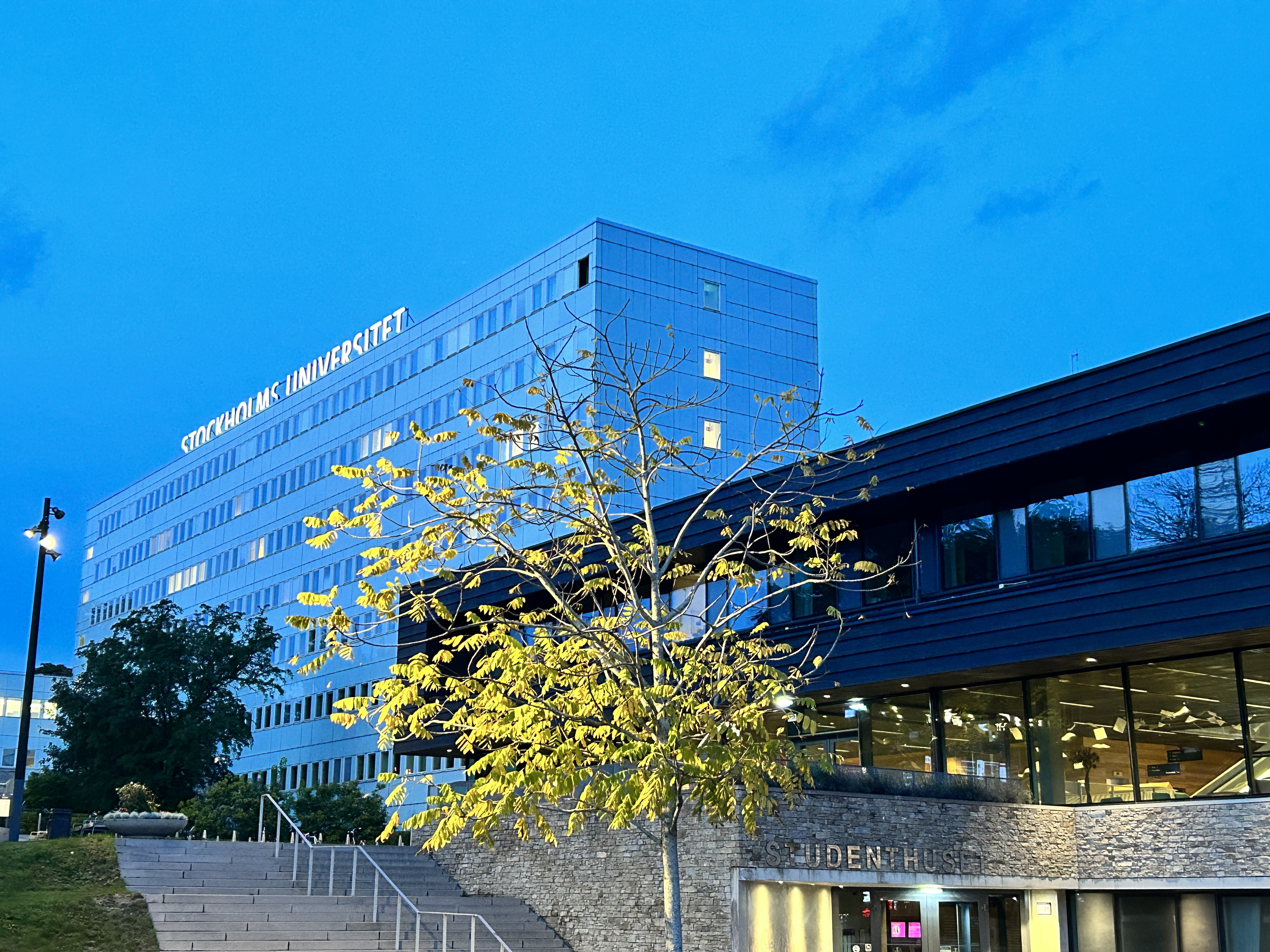
Part of main academic block on Frescati campus

The main part of Stockholm University is in the Frescati area, which extends from the Bergius Botanical Garden in the north to Sveaplan in the south. It is located in the world's first national urban park and the area is characterized by nature, architecture and modern art, featuring such notable buildings as the Aula Magna (auditorium). Within Frescati, the areas Albano, the Bergius Botanical Garden, Frescati Backe, Frescati Hage, Kräftriket, Lilla Frescati and Sveaplan are located. The names of many of these areas have a history dating back to the late 1700s. After Gustav III's trip to Italy in 1783–84, several places at Brunnsviken were given Italian names. Stockholm University has another campus in Kista, which houses the Department of computer and systems sciences.

== Public transportation to Stockholm University ==
There are many ways to get to Stockholm University. The main campus Frescati is located near the underground Universitetet metro station, on the Red Line of the Stockholm Metro. The commuter train line Roslagsbanan also stop close to the main campus, at Universitetet railway station. SL buses 50, 540, 608, 624C, 628C, 639, 670 676, 680, 690, 691, 696 and 699 can also be used to get to the campus.

The Computer Science campus at Kista is close to Kista metro station on the Blue Line. It is also located close to the pendeltåg station Helenelund, only one or two stops (depending on bus line) from the bus station Torsnäsgatan located next to the campus area.

== Notable people ==
=== Academics ===
- Karl-Olov Arnstberg, former professor of ethology
- Svante Arrhenius, 1903 Nobel Prize in Chemistry
- Hans Bielenstein, sinologist
- Bert Bolin, meteorologist, first chairman of the Intergovernmental Panel on Climate Change (IPCC)
- Meemann Chang, paleontologist
- Paul Crutzen, 1995 Nobel Prize in Chemistry
- Sara Danius, professor in literature, member of the Swedish Academy
- Horace Engdahl, former permanent secretary of the Swedish Academy
- Hans von Euler-Chelpin, 1929 Nobel Prize in Chemistry
- Harry Flam, economist, dean of the School of Business
- Christer Fuglesang, astronaut, first Swede and Scandinavian in space
- Lucas Gottzén, professor of child and youth studies
- Gunnar von Heijne, professor at the Department of Biochemistry and Biophysics
- Sven Hessle, professor in social work
- George de Hevesy, 1943 Nobel Prize in Chemistry
- Oskar Klein, professor in physics
- Sofja Kovalevskaja, mathematician, first female professor of mathematics in Europe
- Thorsten Mauritsen, Danish climate scientist
- Gunnar Myrdal, economist, sociologist and politician. Received the Nobel Memorial Prize in Economic Sciences in 1974
- Johan Rockström, professor of environmental science
- Carl-Gustav Rossby, meteorologist
- Velta Ruke-Dravina (1917–2003), Latvian-born Swedish linguist, folklorist, professor
- Anna Seim (born 1974), Swedish professor of economics
- Carl-Herman Tillhagen, folklorist
- Tomas Tranströmer, 2011 Nobel Prize in Literature
- Frank Wilczek, 2004 Nobel Prize in Physics and a professor of physics
- Ebba Witt-Brattström, professor in literature

=== Alumni ===
Business

- Göran Bronner CFO Swedbank
- Mia Brunell, CEO Kinnevik
- Annika Falkengren, CEO SEB
- Johan Stael von Holstein, Swedish entrepreneur
- Torbjörn Törnqvist CEO Gunvor
- Peter Wallenberg Swedish business leader

Politics and society

- Carl Bildt, Prime Minister of Sweden 1991–1994, and Minister for Foreign Affairs 2006–2014
- Hans Blix (LLD), Minister for Foreign Affairs 1978—1979
- Thomas Bodström, Minister for Justice 2000—2006
- Anna-Britta Hellbom, anthropologist and americanist
- Dag Hammarskjöld (Doctorate in Economics 1933), Secretary General of the United Nations 1953—1961
- Elinor Hammarskjöld, lawyer and diplomat
- Karin Kock-Lindberg, first woman to hold a Ministerial position in Sweden (Minister of Supply 1948—1949), and first female professor of national economy in Sweden
- Princess Madeleine of Sweden, studied art history and ethnology
- Mahoma Mwakipunda Mwaungulu, Malawian freedom fighter and member of Hastings Banda's first cabinet as Economic Advisor
- Carolina Neurath, Swedish journalist and writer
- Barbro Sachs-Osher, diplomat and philanthropist
- Olof Palme, Prime Minister of Sweden 1969—1976, 1982—1986
- Andreas Papandreou, Prime Minister of Greece 1981—1989, 1993—1996: taught at the university 1968–1969
- Georgios Papandreou, Prime minister of Greece 2009—2011; studied sociology 1972–1973
- Fredrik Reinfeldt, Prime Minister of Sweden 2006–2014
- Sara Skyttedal, MEP for Sweden
- Victoria, Crown Princess of Sweden studied Political Science

Entertainment and art

- Alexander Ahndoril, author
- Dr. Alban, musician
- Ingmar Bergman, film director
- Daniel Birnbaum, director of Moderna Museet
- Alexandra Coelho Ahndoril, author
- Maria Lynn Ehren, model, Miss Universe Thailand 2017, Top 5 Miss Universe 2017
- Aron Flam (born 1978), comedian, podcaster, and writer, and actor
- Signe Hammarsten-Jansson (1882–1970), Class of 1905 – Swedish illustrator
- Bilal Haq, poet and geoscientist (studied and taught at the university 1970s)
- Jens Lapidus, criminal defense lawyer and author
- Peter Lindgren, former guitarist of Opeth
- Petra Mede, comedian, TV presenter
- Greg Poehler, actor, author
- André Pops, TV presenter
- Johan Rheborg, actor
- Vilgot Sjöman, film director, author

Sportspeople

- Johan Harmenberg (born 1954), 1980 Olympic champion in épée fencing

== See also ==
- Stockholm University Library
- Bergian Garden of Stockholm University
- Royal Institute of Technology
- Stockholm School of Economics
- Oskar Klein Memorial Lecture
- List of modern universities in Europe (1801–1945)
- List of universities in Sweden
- The Order of the Frog
- RATS Theatre
