= The Order of the Frog =

The Order of the Frog or The Order of the Ever Jumping and Smiling Little Green Frog is an academic order associated with the Natural Sciences Faculty Club at Stockholm University since 1917. Its motto is Numquam Veni ad Astra, 'No one reaches the stars'. Membership in the order is awarded at the Lucia Ball at Stockholm University as part of the Nobel Prize celebrations to those who have made exceptional contributions to the natural sciences and/or student life. Nobel Laurates in the natural sciences that attend the ball are invested into the Order of the Frog together with other students. Investees are said to be required to jump like frogs on the university campus, in accordance with tradition from the original award in 1917.

When a member of the order dies, the closest members are asked to return the frog insignia, which the members wear around their necks or otherwise destroy.

The Order have in recent times undergone controversy, as multiple allegations of discrimination and abuse have surfaced, including physical altercations with Faculty Club members during the Lucia ball.
