= The Ark, London =

Office building in Hammersmith, London

The Ark
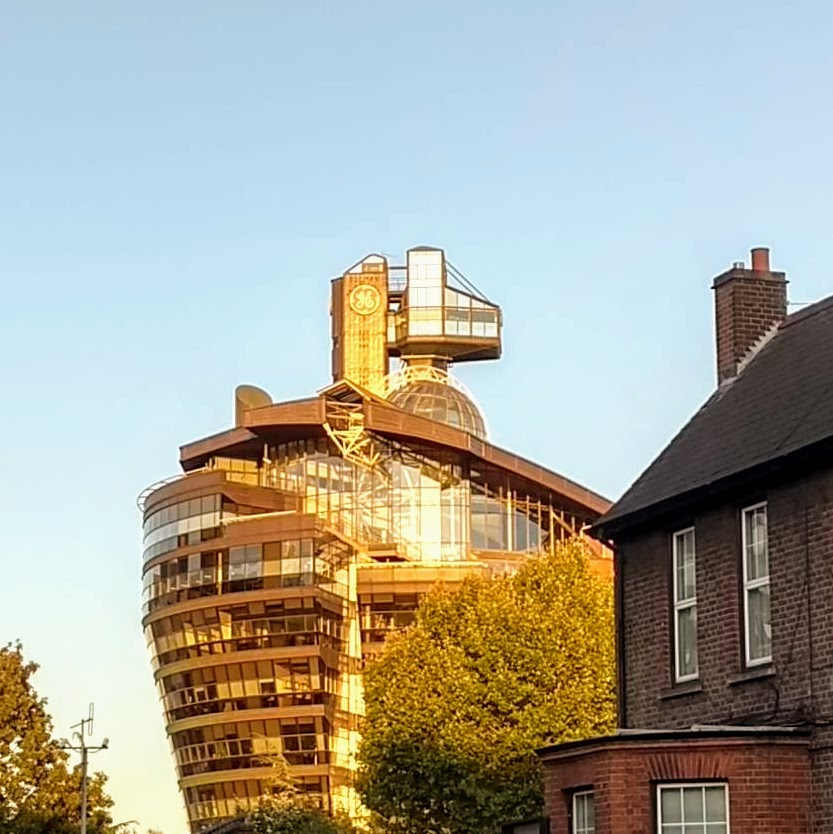

General information
- Location: 201 Talgarth Road, Hammersmith, London, England, United Kingdom
- Coordinates: 51.4909°N 0.2206°W
- Construction started: 1989
- Completed: 1992

Height
- Roof: 76 metres (249 ft)

Technical details
- Floor count: 10
- Floor area: 15,600 square metres (167,900 sq ft)

Design and construction
- Architects: Ralph Erskine, Lennart Bergström, Arkitektkontor, Rock Townsend

The Ark is an office building located in Hammersmith, London, England.

== Original building ==
The building lies immediately south of the Hammersmith Flyover. Named in reference to its hull-like profile, the Ark was designed by architect Ralph Erskine, for Swedish developers Ake Larson and Pronator.

Erskine, based in Sweden, worked from a small office in collaboration with other trusted architects in order to retain design freedom. In the case of the Ark, Erskine and Vernon Gracie (who worked with Erskine on Byker Wall in Newcastle) collaborated with London architects Rock Townsend and latterly Lennart Bergstrom in Stockholm.

Planning permission for the building was granted on 19 September 1989; building commenced the same day and the complex was completed in 1992. Owing to the difficult economic circumstances at the time, Ake Larson's UK division did not survive to occupy the building. Drinks company Seagram subsequently occupied the Ark from 1996 until it was bought by Vivendi Universal in 2000.

== Refurbishment ==
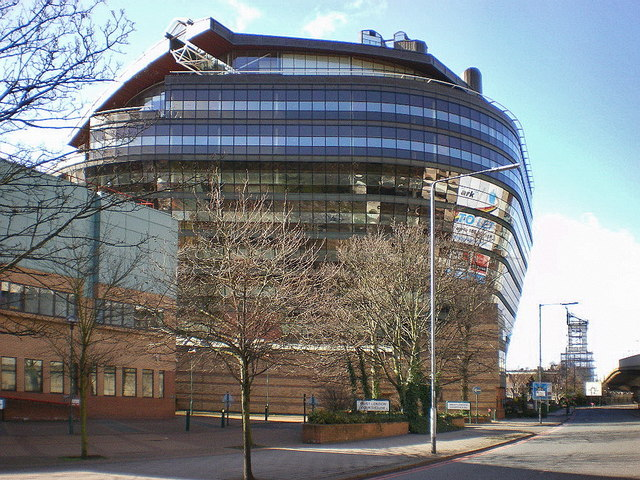
The Ark on Talgarth Road

In 2006 German property company Deka sold the Ark to Landid backed by GE Real Estate and O&H Properties, who saw the building required a refit to make the interior better suited for multiple tenants.

The ensuing £20 million conversion was carried out by DN-A architects, comprising the stripping out of the central “village” and connecting walkways which spanned the atrium and the floorplates filled in creating two smaller atriums turning “the doughnut plan into a pretzel” in the words of DN-A director Stuart McLarty.

A new double height atrium was created on the ground floor, and a new fifth and sixth floor were erected, while the seventh floor was extended as an open mezzanine. As a result, net lettable floor space was increased by 30%, from 12,100 square metres (130,000 sq ft) to 15,600 square metres (168,000 sq ft). Each floor can be subdivided into two spaces and the open balustrading has been replaced with partially glazed partitions.

The building remained unoccupied until 2009.
