= Anna Seim =

Swedish Professor of Economics (born 1974)

Anna Larsson Seim (born 1974), is a Swedish Professor of Economics at Stockholm University and a Deputy Governor of the Swedish Riksbank. She was the deputy head of the Department of Economics at Stockholm University between 2018 and 2024.

Seim obtained her PhD at the Institute for International Economic Studies (IIES) at Stockholm University in 2007 with the dissertation Real Effects of Monetary Regimes. Her research focuses on the impact of monetary policy and fiscal policy on wage setting and macroeconomic performance, the behaviour of exchange rates, as well as the relation between institutions and long-term growth.

Seim also has several appointments outside of academia. She is a member of the board of directors of The Swedish Financial Supervisory Authority, the Swedish Fiscal Policy Council and the scientific council of the Swedish National Debt Office. She was previously a member of the board of The Expert Group on Public Economics at the Swedish Ministry of Finance. In 2018, she was one of the two discussants when the Committee on Finance in the Swedish parliament held a hearing on that year's monetary policy. In 2023, she was also involved in an evaluation of monetary policy, commissioned by the Committee on Finance.

Seim often comments on macroeconomic issues in national Swedish media, such as Svenska Dagbladet, Expressen and Dagens industri. She is also an associate editor for The Scandinavian Journal of Economics.
