= Göran Bronner =

Swedish investment officer

Göran Bronner (born 1962) was CFO of Swedbank AB (publ) from 2011 to 2016.

== Education and career ==
Göran Bronner holds a degree in Economics from Stockholm University. Bronner joined Skandinaviska Enskilda Banken (SEB) as a trainee in 1984. Two years later he moved into SEB Trading & Capital Markets Division as a foreign exchange dealer and in 1988 transferred to SEB London Branch first as Chief dealer Foreign Exchange and in 1991 as Head of Trading. Upon returning to SEB in Stockholm in 1992, Bronner assumed the position as Head of Trading, including FX, Funding, Derivatives and domestic Bond Market. In 1995 he took responsibility for SEB’s Global Foreign Exchange department. In 1997 Bronner moved to SEB Singapore as Managing Director.

Bronner left SEB in 2000 to become founding partner, main owner and chief investment officer of a hedge fund named Tanglin. 2000-2008 the fund returned in total 95% with low volatility and assets under management grew to 4 billion SEK. A second fund, Tangent, started in 2007.

Bronner joined Swedbank in March 2009 as Chief Risk Officer. He assumed his role as Chief Financial Officer in August 2011, a role he held until he stepped down in 2016.

== Recognition ==
In 2015, the President of Estonia awarded Göran Bronner the Order of the Cross of Terra Mariana. Bronner received the award for his contributions to securing the competitiveness of the financial sector in Estonia and other Baltic countries during the financial crisis.
