= Stockholm University Library =

Research library in Stockholm, Sweden

Coordinates: 59.3633°N 18.0606°E

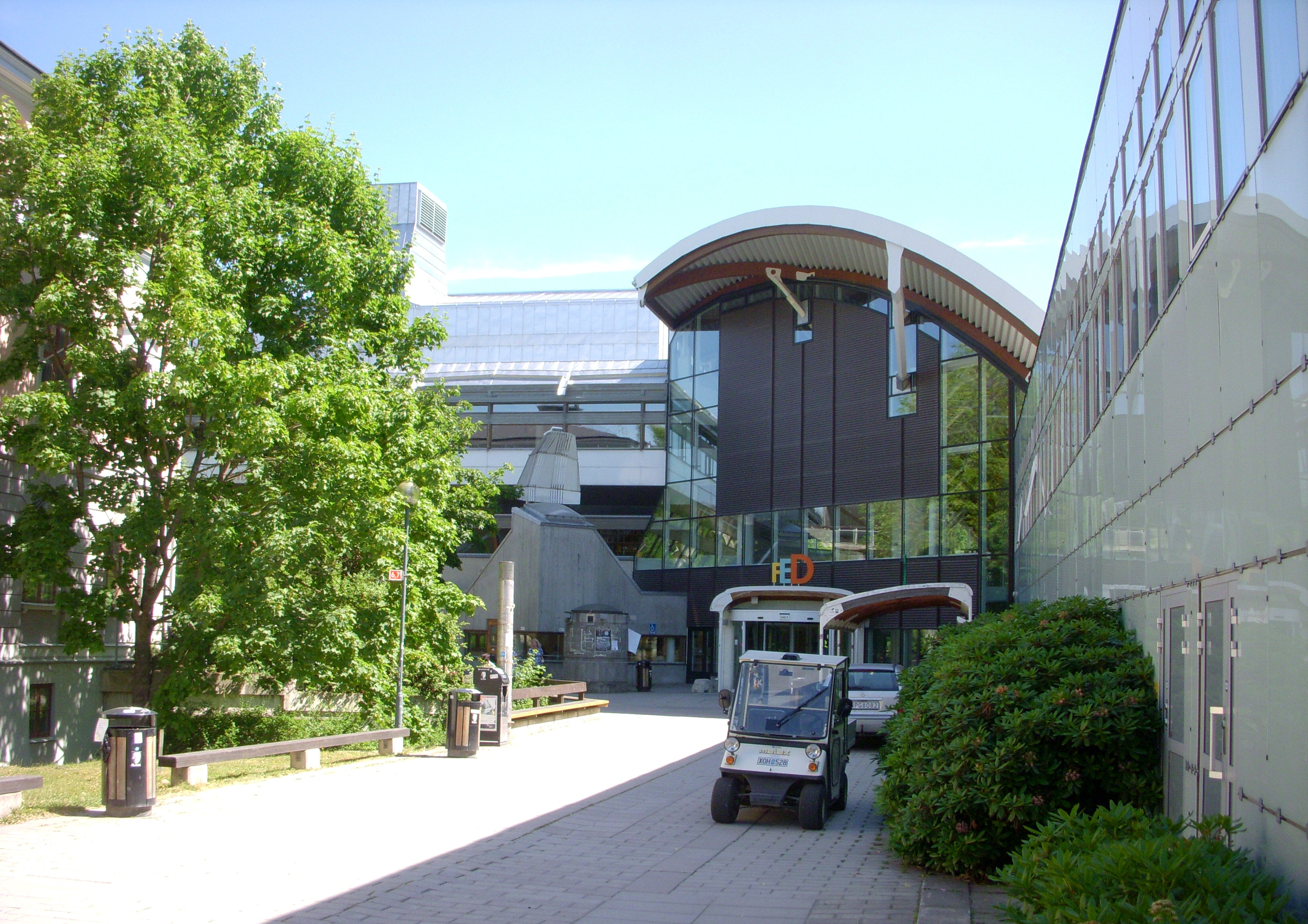
- Location: Universitetsvägen 14D, Stockholm University, 106 91 Stockholm, 10691

Other information
- Website: www.su.se/stockholm-university-library/

Stockholm University Library (Swedish: Stockholms universitetsbibliotek) is the research library of the Stockholm University with one main library and eight unit libraries. Stockholm University Library is one of Sweden's largest research libraries, providing extensive access to e-books and other digital material as well as interlibrary loans. The focus groups are students, researchers and teachers. They have access to the collections of printed as well as online literature, tools for e-publishing of essays, study places, research results and education in information, scientific communication and how to work with references. Stockholm University Library is also a public library with over 1.4 million visitors in 2012.

== History ==
The university library dates back to 1877 when it started building up its collections of literature and magazines through donations and purchases. The collections were moved between different locations until they were accommodated in the attic of the school Norra Latin. The need for literature increased as the university grew. In 1882 more donations further extended the collection after an appeal had been made. The largest book donations were given by The Royal Library in Copenhagen and the University of Oslo in Norway.

A number of libraries were opened in the city of Stockholm, such as the Socialvetenskapliga biblioteket, Juridiska biblioteket, Slaviska biblioteket and Humanistiska biblioteket. The Humanistiska biblioteket was to become a meeting point for young intellectuals into the 1960s with its location close to Stureplan. In 1971 the faculties of the university all were located to the new Campus in Frescati north of the inner city. At the same time today's university library organisation was founded. Different libraries, such as Riksdagsbiblioteket, Kungliga biblioteket and Vetenskapsakademiens bibliotek continued to be responsible for the purchase of literature throughout the 1970s. In 1978 the university library was given the responsibility of The Library of the Royal Swedish Academy of Sciences (Kungliga vetenskapsakademins bibliotek), founded in 1739, thus giving the library access to one of Europe's largest collections of nature science, including the collections of Carl Linnaeus and Emanuel Swedenborg. The Emanuel Swedenborg Collection was selected as Memory of the Unesco World Register in 2005.

== Building ==
The British-Swedish Architect Ralph Erskine was appointed to create the main library building in 1982. Situated in the University Campus Frescati, it was constructed as an extension of the existing university building Södra huset (The South House) from the 1960s by David Helldén. Erskine created a linkage between the buildings with his trademark, an arched-formed roof, at the same time creating the main entrance of the library. The facades and roof are dominated by concrete and aluminium. The library by Erskine connects with the building Allhuset, made by Erskine in 1981. The university library was inaugurated in January 1983.

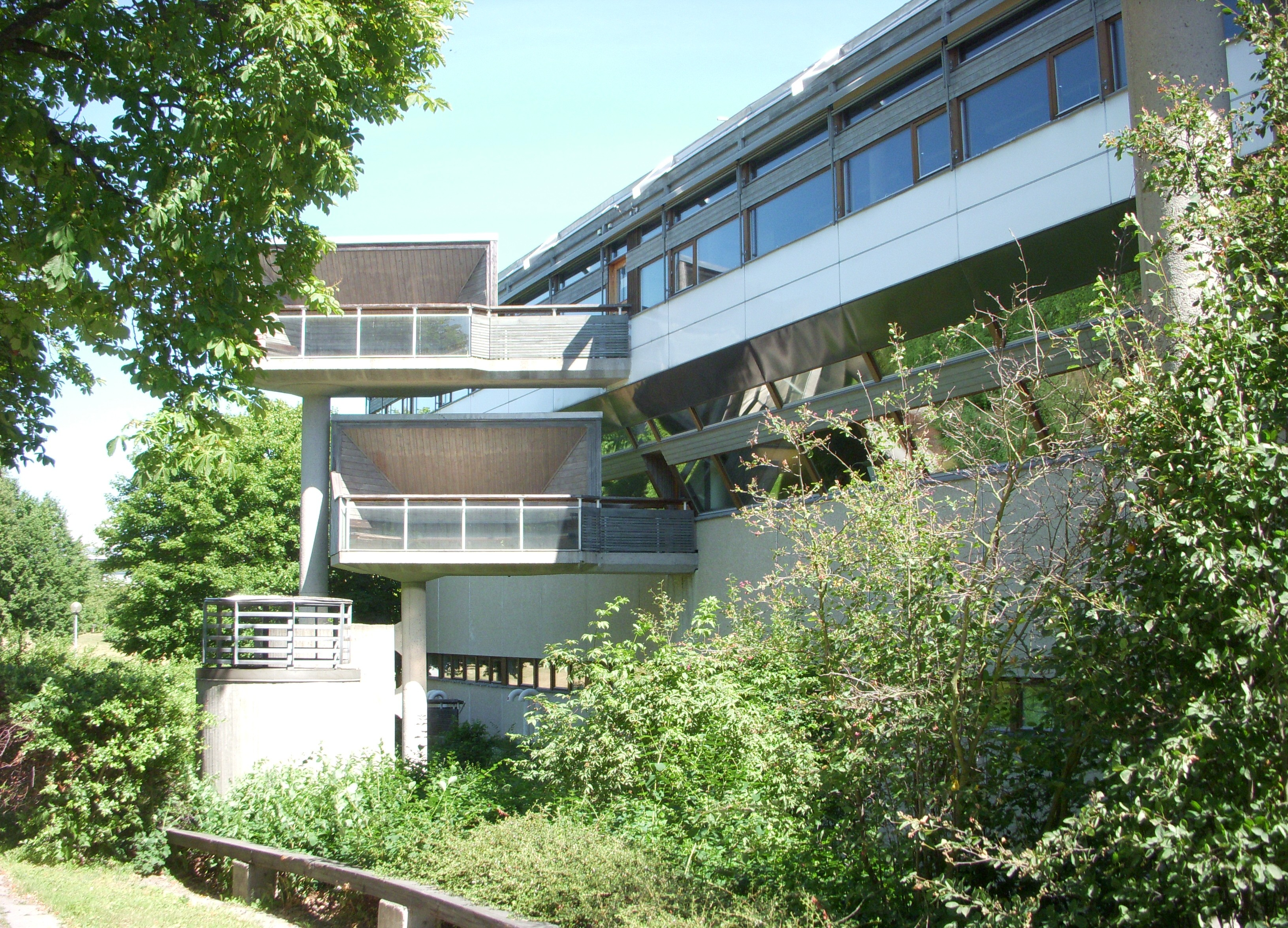
Stockholm University Library

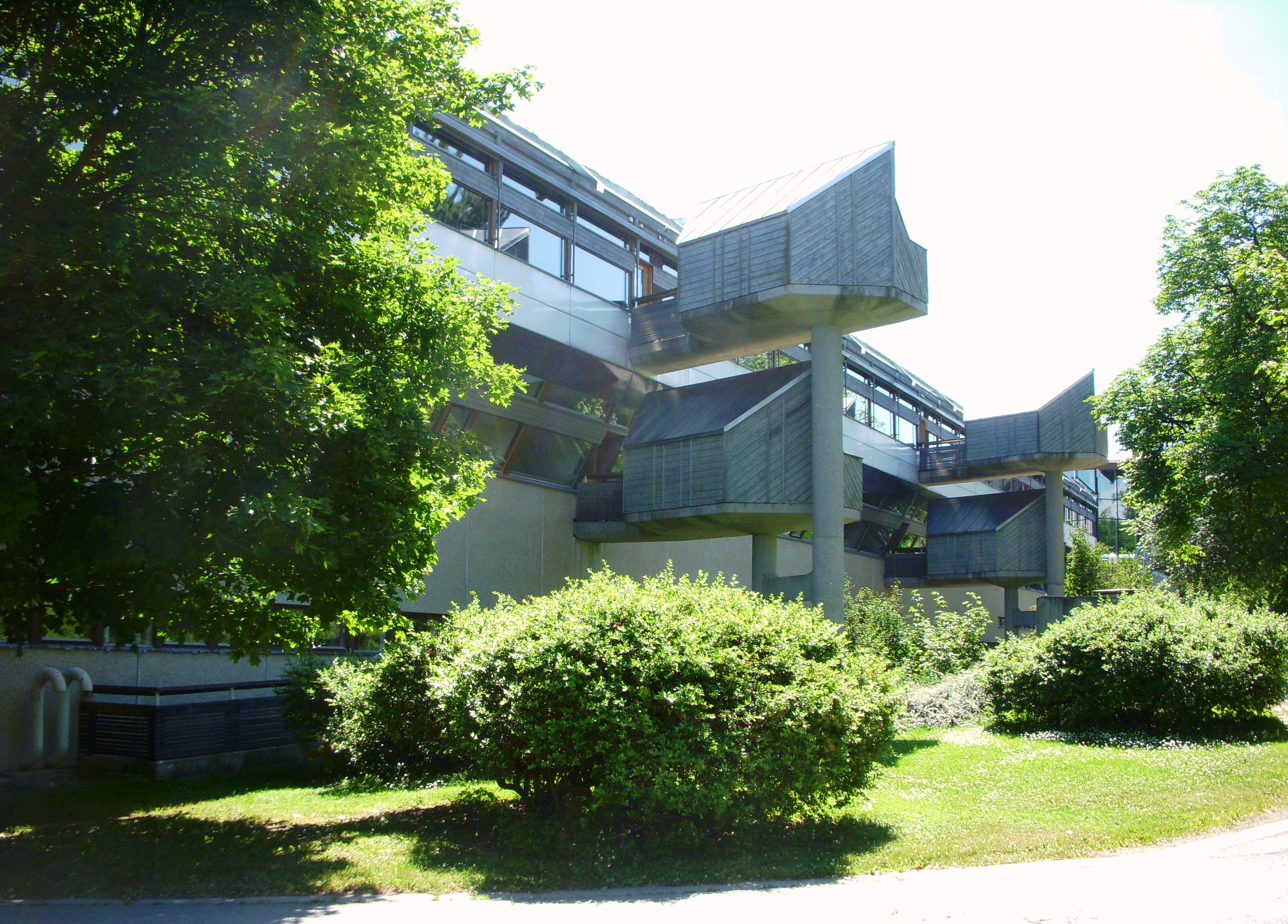
Balconies for reading

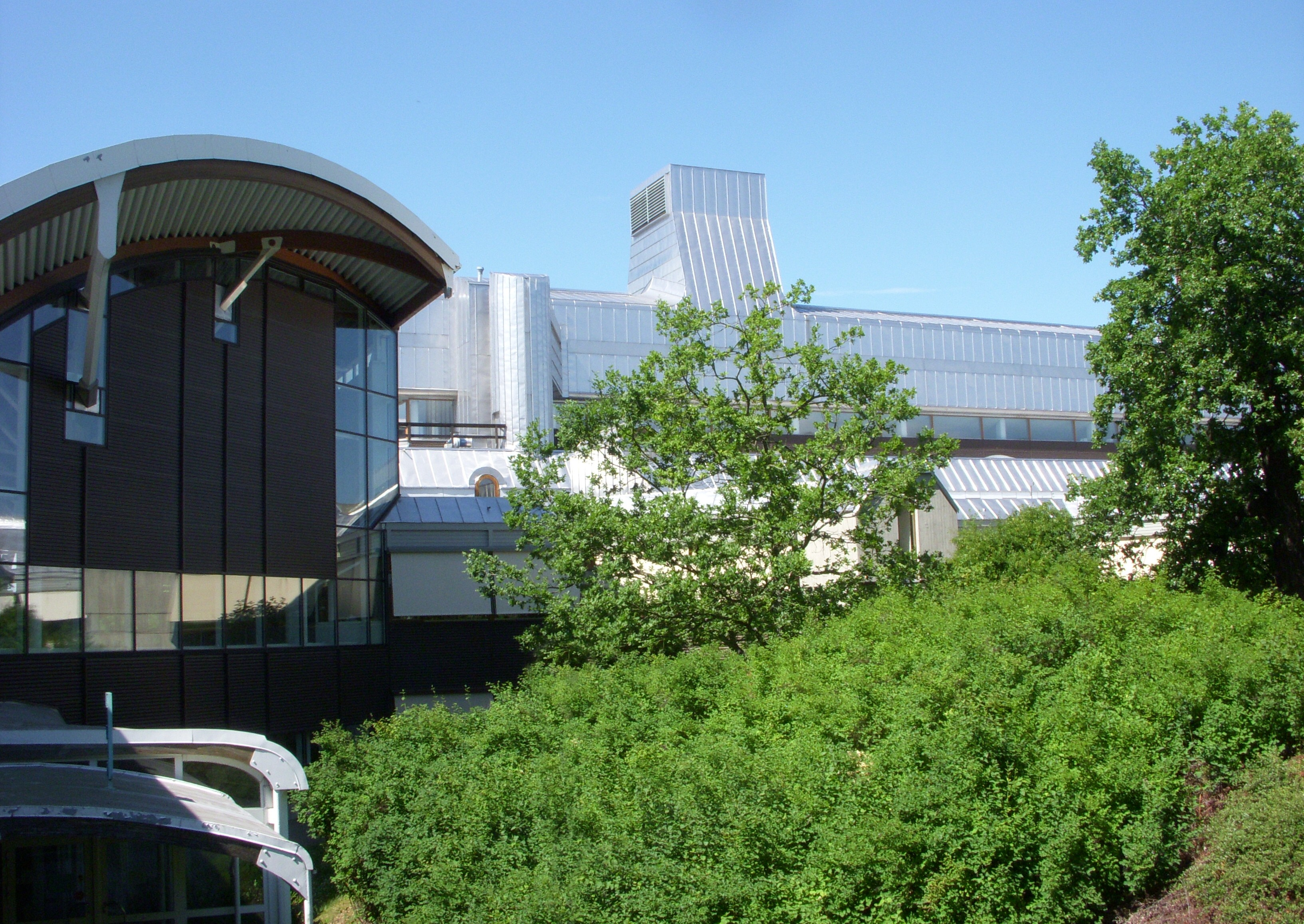
The arch-formed roof of the entrance

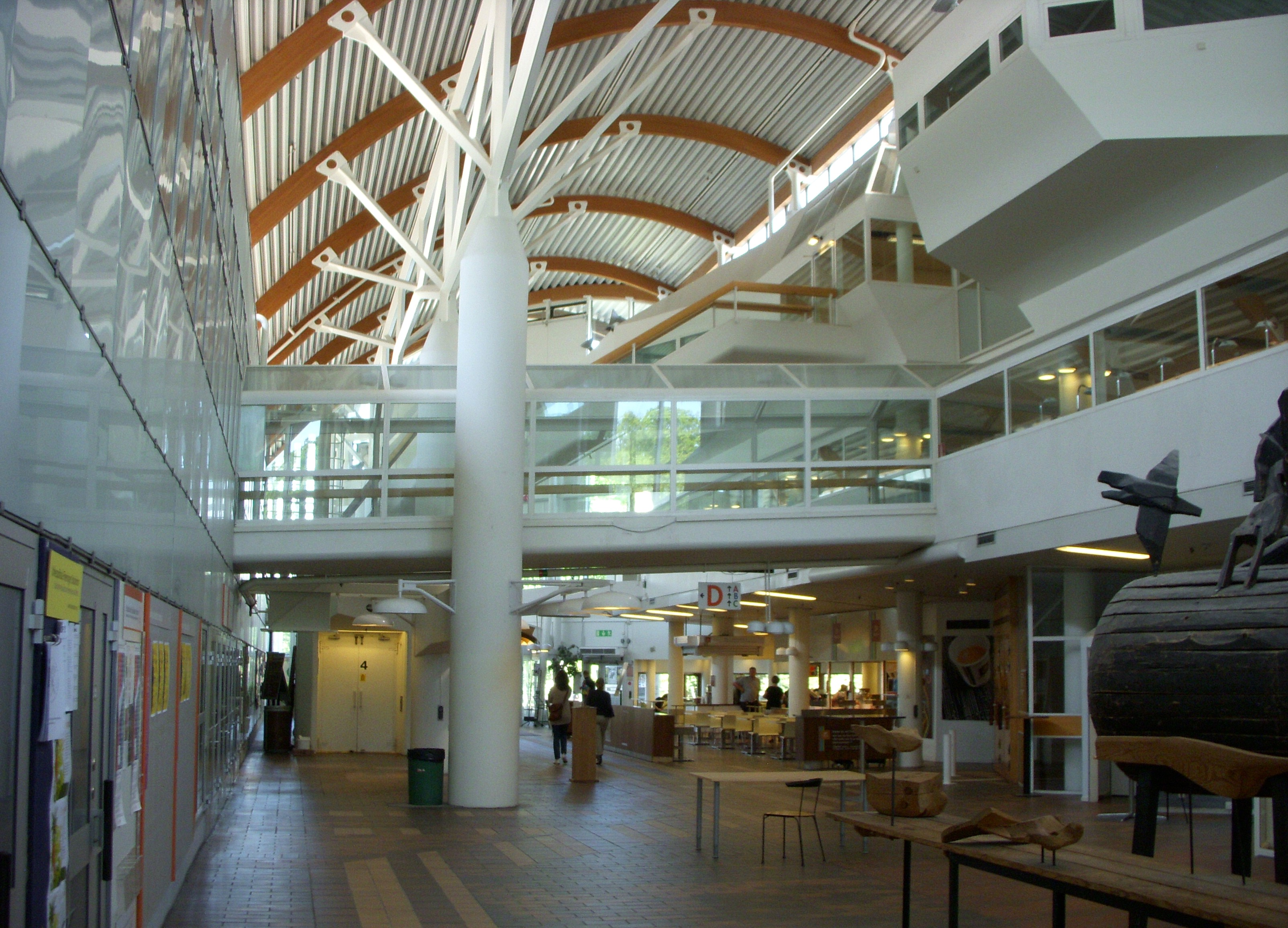
Hall of the Stockholm University Library

== Stockholm University Press ==
The library's organisation also includes the university's publisher Stockholm University Press. Stockholm University Press is an open access publisher of peer-reviewed academic journals and books. We aim to make journals and books affordable, and to enable the widest possible dissemination so that researchers around the world can find and access the information they need without barriers.

== DiVA portal ==
DiVA portal is a search tool.

Researchers at Stockholm University must register their publishing activity in DiVA. This applies to everything from popular science publications and books to scientific articles and monographs.

DiVA at Stockholm University contains publications produced by the university's researchers and students. Since 2007, DiVA has been required to contain bibliographic information on all publications from Stockholm University's researchers and teachers. The University Library is responsible for quality assurance of the records in DiVA and makes regular imports from Web of Science and Scopus.

== See also ==
- List of libraries in Sweden
