= Kopano Ratele =

South African psychologist

- Born: 1969 (age 56–57); Maboloka, South Africa
- Education: Phuthanang Primary School Akanyang Primary School Katlehong High School
- Alma mater: University of the Western Cape
- Known for: Men and Masculinities cultural and critical psychology
- Spouse: Carmine Rustin
- Children: One child: Ketso Ratele
- Scientific career
- Fields: Psychology; Men & Masculinities
- Workplaces: University of the Western Cape University of South Africa Stellenbosch University

Kopano Ratele is a decolonial social scientist and men and masculinities studies scholar. He is known for his work on Africa-centring psychology, masculinity, fatherhood, culture, sexuality, and violence. He is former co-director of the South African Medical Research Council-University of South Africa (Unisa)'s Violence, Injury & Peace Research Unit. In 2009-2010 he was president of the Psychological Society of South Africa.

== Career ==
He chaired the board of Sonke Gender Justice, a South African nongovernmental organisation working across Africa to strengthen government, civil society and citizen capacity to promote gender equality, prevent domestic and sexual violence, and reduce the spread and impact of HIV and AIDS.

He is a regular contributor to media on matters related to boys, men and masculinity, violence, and fatherhood. In 2017-2018 he co-hosted a weekly radio show on fatherhood, CapeTalk Dads, on The Koketso Sachane Show with Koketso Sachane and Mbuyiselo Botha on CapeTalk Radio. From 2021 he has co-hosted a fatherhood and parenting feature with Koketso Sachane on The Meeting Point.

Ratele was previously professor at the University of the Western Cape. He then joined the Institute for Social and Health Sciences at the University of South Africa (Unisa) where he ran the Research Unit on Men & Masculinities and the Transdisciplinary African Psychologies Programme. During the same period he was researcher and co-director of the South African Medical Research Council (SAMRC)-Unisa the Violence, Injury & Peace Research Unit. He was the director of the SAMRC-Unisa Masculinity and Health Research Unit.

In 2021 he became professor of Psychology Department at Stellenbosch University.

== Books ==
- Why Men Hurt Women and Other Reflections on Love, Violence and Masculinity
- The World Looks Likes This From Here: Thoughts on African Psychology (2019, Wits Press)
- Engaging Youth in Activism, Research and Pedagogical Praxis: Transnational and Intersectional Perspectives on Gender, Sex, and Race (2018, Routledge)
- Liberating Masculinities (2016, HSRC Press)
- There was this Goat: Investigating the Truth Commission Testimony of Notrose Nobomvu Konile (2009, University of Kwazulu-Natal Press)
- From Boys to Men: Social Constructions of Masculinity in Contemporary Society (2007, University of Cape Town Press)
- Intergroup Relations: South African Perspectives (2006, Juta Academic)
- Self, Psychology and Community (2004, University of Cape Town Press)
- Social Psychology: Identities & Relationships (2003, University of Cape Town Press)
