= Annabelle (given name) =

- Pronunciation: /ˈænəbɛl/ AN-ə-bel
- Gender: Female
- Language: French, English

Origin
- Meaning: "grace, beauty"

Other names
- See also: Annabella, Annabel, Anabel, Anna, Mabel

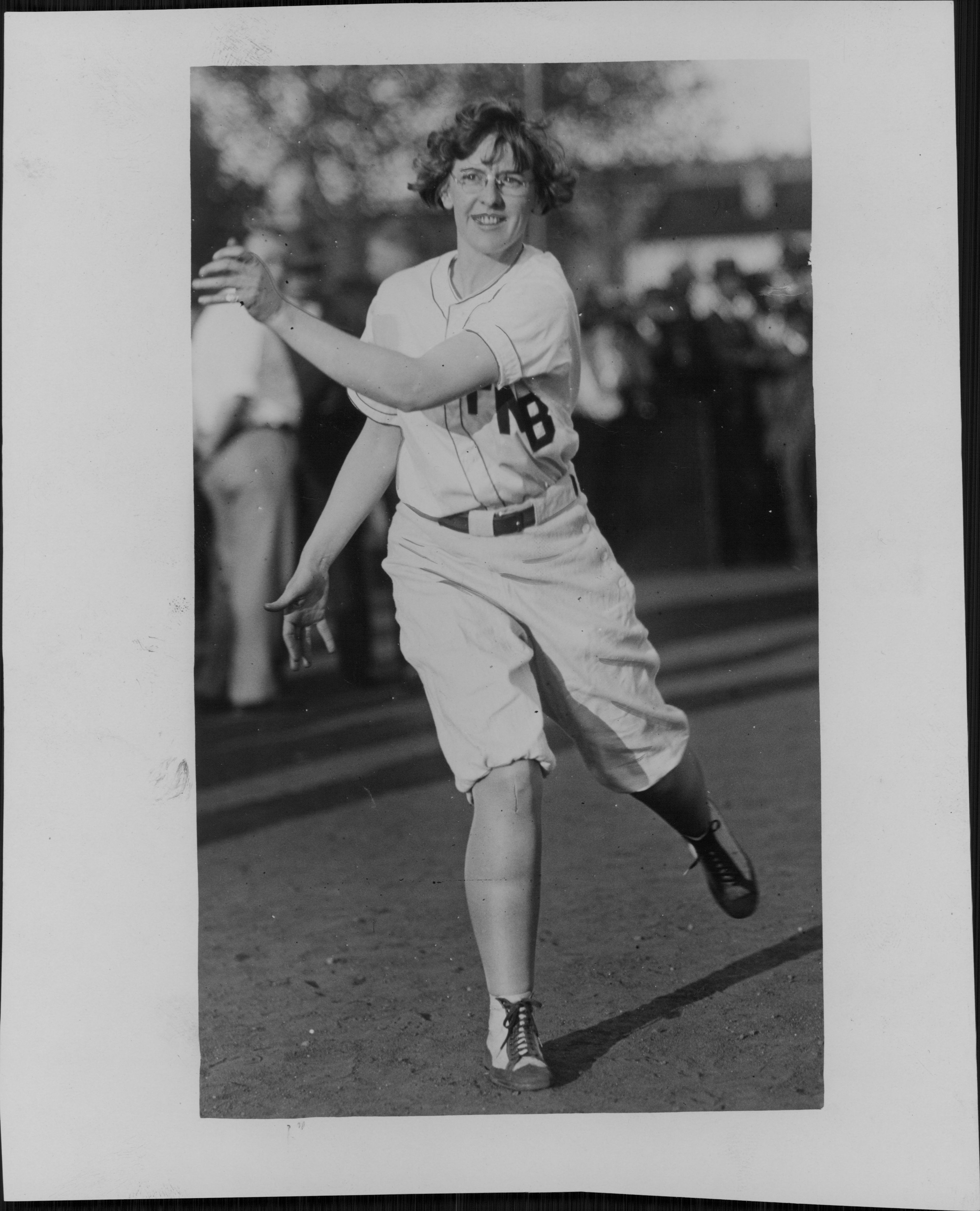
Annabelle Mahoney

Annabelle is a feminine given name of French origin, a combination of the Latin name Anna, which comes from the Hebrew word for grace, and the French word belle, meaning beauty.

== Notable people ==
- Annabelle, French singer and actress
- Annabelle Ali, Cameroonian freestyle wrestler
- Annabelle Apsion, English actress
- Annabelle Attanasio, American actress and filmmaker
- Annabelle Bennett, Australian judge
- Annabelle Bernard (1934–2005), African-American operatic soprano
- Annabelle Berthomé-Reynolds, French violinist and pedagogy specialist
- Annabelle Boettcher, German scientist
- Annabelle Bond, British mountain climber
- Annabelle Carey, New Zealander swimmer
- Annabelle Chukwu, Canadian soccer player
- Annabelle Chvostek, Canadian musician
- Annabelle Cleeland, Australian politician
- Annabelle Codey, Australian rugby player
- Annabelle Colman, Australian Paralympic athlete
- Annabelle Collins, Bermudian dressage rider
- Annabelle Combes, French writer
- Annabelle Courcelles, Ivorian handball player
- Annabelle Cripps, British swimmer
- Annabelle Davis, British actress
- Annabelle Dennis, Australian wheelchair basketball player
- Annabelle Dexter-Jones, British-American actress and director
- Annabelle Dowler, English actress
- Annabelle Dreville, French cyclist
- Annabelle Duncan, Australian microbiologist
- Annabelle d'Huart, French visual artist
- Annabelle Euranie, French judoka
- Annabelle Ewing, Scottish politician
- Annabelle Gamson (1928–2023), American dancer and choreographer
- Annabelle Gawer, French and British business theorist
- Annabelle Gurwitch, American actress
- Annabelle Huggins, Filipino actress
- Annabelle Jaramillo, American politician
- Annabelle Kovacs, Canadian rhythmic gymnast
- Annabelle Laprovidence, Mauritian judoka
- Annabelle Lascar, Mauritian middle-distance runner
- Annabelle Lee (1922–2008), American baseball player
- Annabelle Lee-Mather, New Zealander television journalist and producer
- Annabelle Lengronne, French actress
- Annabelle Lewis, British sprinter
- Annabelle Lindsay, Australian wheelchair basketball player
- Annabelle Lopez Ochoa, Belgian ballet dancer and choreographer
- Annabelle Louie, Hong Konger singer
- Annabelle Lyon (1916–2011), American ballerina
- Annabelle Mariejeanne, Mauritian swimmer
- Annabelle Mae McDonnell, Filipino model and beauty pageant titleholder
- Annabelle McIntyre, Australian rower
- Annabelle McIver, British-Australian computer security researcher
- Annabelle Moore (1878–1961), American actress
- Annabelle Morozov, Russian ice dancer
- Annabelle Neilson (1969–2018), English socialite
- Annabelle Orme, American synchronized swimmer
- Annabelle Pegrum, Australian architect and former public servant
- Annabelle Prölß, German figure skater
- Annabelle Rama, Filipino talent manager and actress
- Annabelle Rankin (1908–1986), Australian politician
- Annabelle Selldorf, German architect
- Annabelle Sreberny (1949–2022), English academic
- Annabelle Stephenson, Australian actress
- Annabelle Terhune, (c. 1904–1986), American journalist
- Annabelle Thompson (1924–1983), Canadian baseball player
- Annabelle Clinton Imber Tuck, American judge
- Annabelle Wallis, British actress
- Annabelle White, New Zealander food writer
- Annabelle Whitestone, British music manager
- Annabelle Williams, Australian Paralympic swimmer

=== Fictional characters ===
- Annabelle, a calf-turned-reindeer in the 1997 direct-to-video animated Christmas film Annabelle's Wish
- Annabelle, a supernatural doll who has appeared in the horror media franchise The Conjuring Universe since 2013

== See also ==
- Anabel, given name
- Anabelle, given name
- Annabel (disambiguation)
- Anabelle Lee (disambiguation)
