= Anabel =

- Pronunciation: Ah-Na-Bell
- Gender: Female
- Language: Irish, Spanish, and French

Other names
- See also: Anna, Ann, Annabella, Isabel

Anabel is a feminine given name. It is the Spanish version of Annabel.

Notable people with this given name:

- Anabel Abarca, American politician
- Anabel Acosta Islas, Mexican politician
- Anabel Alonso, Spanish actress
- Anabel Balkenhol, German dressage rider
- Anabel Bosch (1976–2009), Filipina musician
- Anabel Colazo, Spanish illustrator and cartoonist
- Anabel Conde, Spanish singer
- Anabel Drousiotou, Cypriot swimmer
- Anabel Englund, American singer and songwriter
- Anabel Fernández Sagasti, Argentine politician
- Anabel Ferreira, Mexican actress and comedian
- Anabel Figueroa, Salvadorian American politician
- Anabel Ford, American archaeologist
- Anabel Gambero, Argentine field hockey player
- Anabel González, Costa Rican and American economic development expert
- Anabel Gutiérrez (1931–2022), Mexican actress
- Anabel Guzmán, Venezuelan footballer
- Anabel Hernández, Mexican journalist and author
- Anabel Jensen, American educator and author
- Anabel Knoll, German triathlete
- Anabel Martínez, Spanish footballer
- Anabel Medina, Dominican sprinter
- Anabel Medina Garrigues, Spanish tennis player and coach
- Anabel Moro, Argentine Paralympic swimmer
- Anabel Ochoa, Spanish writer and psychiatrist
- Anabel Ortiz, Mexican boxer
- Anabel Pantoja, Spanish television personality
- Anabel Quan-Haase, Canadian academic and published author
- Anabel Rodríguez Ríos, Venezuelan film director
- Anabel Flores Salazar (c. 1984–2016), Mexican journalist
- Anabel Segura (d. 1993), Spanish kidnap and murder victim
- Anabel Shaw (1921–2010), American actress
- Anabel Ternès, German author and professor
- Anabel Torres, Colombian poet and translator

== See also ==
- Anabelle
- Annabelle (given name)
