= Annabel =

Annabel or Annabelle may refer to:

== Arts and media ==
- Annabel (Baum novel), a 1906 novel by L. Frank Baum
- Annabel (Winter novel), a 2010 novel by Kathleen Winter
- "Annabel", a song by Maria Dimitriadi from the film Girls in the Sun
- "Annabel", a song by Goldfrapp from Tales of Us
- "Annabelle", a song by the Mighty Lemon Drops from Sound ... Goodbye to Your Standards
- Annabelle (film), a 2014 American horror film inspired by the doll
  - Annabelle: Creation, a 2017 prequel film
  - Annabelle Comes Home, a 2019 sequel film
- Annabelle (magazine), a German language women's fashion magazine
- Annabel (band), an emo band from Ohio
- Dr. Annabelle, a fictional character from the animated series Super Duper Bunny League

== People ==
- Annabelle (given name)
- Annabell, stage name for Anna Sedokova, Ukrainian actress and singer
- Annabell Murray, Countess of Mar (1536–1603)
- Annabell Fuller (born 2002), English professional golfer
- Annabel (Japanese singer) (born 1984)
- Annabelle (singer) (born 1967), French singer and actress
- Annabel, a stage name for Evelyn Draper in the film Play Misty for Me

== Other uses ==
- Annabelle, a variety of potato from the Netherlands
- Annabelle, a variety of wild hydrangea
- Annabelle (doll), an alleged haunted doll
- Annabel's, a nightclub in London, UK
- USS Annabelle (SP-1206), a US Navy patrol boat in commission from 1917 to 1918

== See also ==
- Anabel (disambiguation)
  - Anabel, given name
- Anabelle, given name
- Annabella (disambiguation)
- Anabelle Lee (disambiguation)
- Ann Bell (born 1940), British actress
