= Florian Heinemann =

German entrepreneur, venture capitalist and angel investor

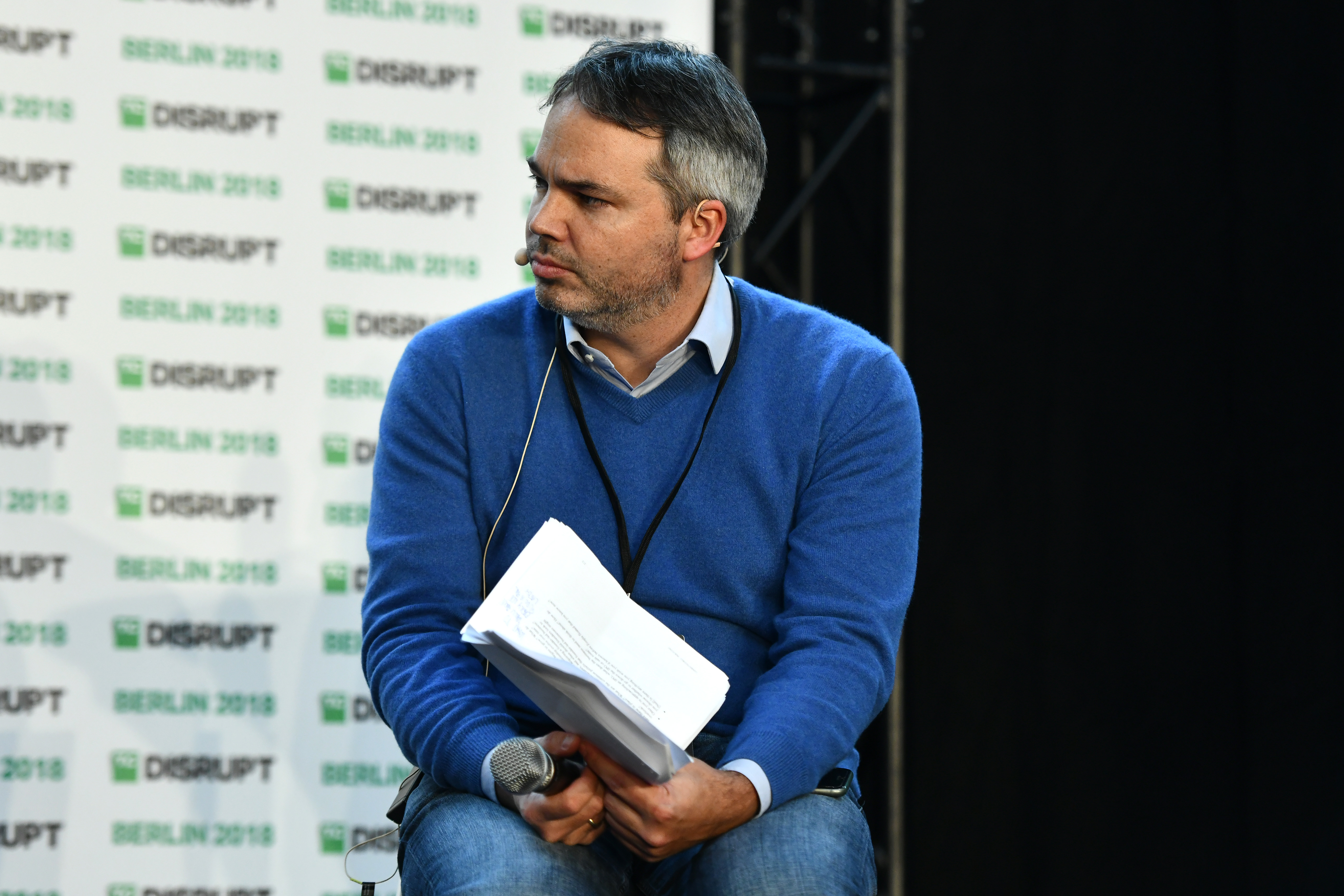
- On stage at TechCrunch Disrupt Berlin 2018
- Born: January 15, 1976 (age 50); Bergisch Gladbach, Germany
- Education: Wharton Business School; WHU-Otto Beisheim School of Management; HHL Leipzig Graduate School of Management; RWTH Aachen University
- Occupations: Entrepreneur; Venture capitalist Angel investor
- Known for: Founding partner of Project A Ventures (2012-today); Launch investor of Zalando (2008); Managing director of Rocket Internet (2007-2012); Founder of JustBooks (1999-2006)
- Website: https://florian-heinemann.de

Florian Heinemann (born January 15, 1976, in Bergisch Gladbach) is a German entrepreneur, venture capitalist and angel investor.

In 1999 Heinemann received a degree in business administration from the WHU - Otto Beisheim School of Management Koblenz. Heinemann was a co-founder and managing director of JustBooks (later AbeBooks, sold to Amazon). After that he was head of online marketing at Jamba! and the Online Dating Portal iLove. In 2006 he co-founded the online marketplace Antibodies Online. From 2007 to 2012 he was a managing director at Rocket Internet. While at Rocket Internet he was mainly involved in the development of Zalando, Global Fashion Group and eDarling of Affinitas. Florian Heinemann is a general partner of the early stage investor Project A Ventures in Berlin, where he is responsible for the areas marketing, CRM and business intelligence. He is a regular speaker and keynote speaker at conferences on entrepreneurship, venture capital, digital marketing and technology. Heinemann has published articles in international scientific journals.

== Bibliography ==
Published in Germany:

- Organisation von Projekten zur Neuproduktentwicklung. Gabler Edition Wissenschaft, Hamburg 2014. ISBN 978-3835007741.
- Unternehmertum. Kochhammer Verlag, Stuttgart 2014. ISBN 978-3170193840.
- Erfolgreiche Unternehmerteams. Springer Gabler, Wiesbaden 2009. ISBN 978-3834903020.

=== Guest contributions ===
Published in Germany:

- Das E-Commerce Buch: Marktanalysen – Geschäftsmodelle – Strategien, Deutscher Fachverlag, 2017. ISBN 978-3866413078.
- Online Mittelstand in Deutschland, Band 4, CreateSpace Independent Publishing, 2015. ISBN 978-1516898657.
- Entrepreneurship (ZfB Special Issue), Gabler Verlag, 2006. ISBN 978-3834903631.
- Online-Kooperationen: Erfolg im E-Business durch strategische Partnerschaften, Gabler Verlag, 2003. ISBN 978-3409123693.
- Innovation – Technik – Zukunft, Springer Fachmedien Wiesbaden, 2002. ISBN 978-3810036506.
- Die eCommerce-Gewinner. Wie Unternehmen im Web profitabel wurden., Frankfurter Allgemeine Buch, 2002. ISBN 978-3934191709.
- Silicon Valley, Made in Germany. Was Sie von erfolgreichen Unternehmen der New Economy lernen können., Vieweg Publishing Company, 2000. ISBN 978-3528057473.

== Recognition ==
- 2025 Forbes "The Midas List Europe 2025"
- 2012 “Top 40 under 40” (printed edition Capital Deutschland Magazine)
- 1996–1999 scholarship holder of the German Academic Scholarship Foundation
