= Annabella (disambiguation) =

Annabella is a feminine given name.

Annabella may also refer to:

- Annabella, County Cork, Ireland
- Annabella, Utah, US
- Annabella (actress), French film actress active from 1927 to 1952
- Annabella (company), Italian fur fashion brand
- Annabella (magazine), Italian women's magazine
- Annabelle (magazine), Swiss women's magazine
- "Annabella", a 1969 song by Aphrodite's Child from It's Five O'Clock
- "Annabella", a 1970 song by Dave Dee, later a hit for Hamilton, Joe Frank & Reynolds from their 1971 debut album
