= Christian Thiele =

Christian Thiele is a German coach and writer whose work focuses on positive psychology in organizations and on positive leadership. He teaches in higher education and professional programs, including as a faculty member at the Karlsruhe Institute of Technology's House of Competence. He serves on the board of the German-speaking Association for Positive Psychology, known as DACH-PP, and is author of books on leadership such as Positiv führen für Dummies. He also hosts the German-language management podcast Positiv Führen.

== Early life and education ==
Thiele was raised in Füssen, Germany. He completed a traineeship in journalism at Augsburger Allgemeine and then studied political science in Berlin and Paris. He later worked in major German newsrooms before moving into teaching and writing. He also holds a Franco-German diploma in politics and social sciences and a master's degree in positive psychology and coaching.

== Career ==
Thiele began his career in national and international journalism and held editorial leadership roles before specializing in the application of positive psychology to leadership and work. He also writes a recurring column for the HR trade magazine Personalwirtschaft.

Beyond writing, Thiele teaches and trains in higher education and executive programs. He is a faculty member at the DHGS German University of Health and Sports (Deutsche Hochschule für Gesundheit und Sport) in Berlin and Munich, and serves as a trainer for the Deutsche Gesellschaft für Positive Psychologie. Thiele also serves as a board member of the German-speaking Association for Positive Psychology.

As an author, Thiele has published multiple titles regarding leadership and workplace psychology. His bibliography includes Positiv führen für Dummies (published by Wiley-VCH), Job Crafting (published by Springer Gabler), and a co-authored volume on employee communication published by BusinessVillage. He also hosts the German-language management podcast Positiv Führen.

== Selected works ==
- Positiv führen für Dummies. Wiley-VCH.
- Positiv führen. Haufe.
- Job Crafting. Springer Gabler.
- Mitarbeitergespräche positiv führen co-authored with Marcus Schweighart. BusinessVillage.
