= Maria Antonia Berrios =

American politician (born 1977)

Member of the Illinois House of Representatives from the 39th district
- In office 2003–2015
- Succeeded by: Will Guzzardi

Personal details
- Born: April 24, 1977 (age 49) Chicago, Illinois
- Party: Democratic
- Spouse: James Weiss

Maria Antonia "Toni" Berrios (born April 24, 1977) is an American politician and former Democratic member of the Illinois House of Representatives, where she represented the 39th District from 2003 to 2015. She was the first Puerto Rican American woman to serve in the Illinois House. Berrios is the daughter of Joseph Berrios, who was formerly a member of the Illinois House of Representatives, Cook County Assessor, and chairman of the Cook County Democratic Party.

== Early life, education and career ==
Berrios is the daughter of politician and lobbyist Joseph Berrios, former Cook County Assessor, former chairman of the Democratic Party of Cook County, and formerly a member of the Illinois House of Representatives and a Commissioner on the Cook County Board of Review, a property tax appeal panel. Berrios graduated from Northeastern Illinois University with a Board of Governor's Degree, a non-traditional degree.

Berrios held a life insurance agent license which expired in June, 2012 and has been inactive since June, 2013. Berrios worked for the Illinois Liquor Control Commission as a tobacco compliance specialist. She also worked for the Cook County Recorder of Deeds.

== Illinois House of Representatives ==
The 39th District of the Illinois House of Representatives was newly created in the 2001 redistricting after the 2000 census to encourage additional Hispanic representation. The district is on Chicago's Northwest Side and includes parts of the Avondale, Belmont Cragin, Hermosa, Logan Square, and Portage Park neighborhoods. At age 25 and newly graduated from college, Berrios ran unopposed in the 2002 primary and general elections. Berrios was the first Puerto Rican American woman to serve in the Illinois House of Representatives. Berrios' political action committee, Citizens for Maria A. Berrios, has received campaign contributions from many of the same property tax appeal law firms that contribute to the multiple campaign funds controlled by her father, Joseph Berrios, who is the Cook County Assessor and a former Commissioner on the Cook County Board of Review. Berrios' political campaign committee has received tens of thousands of dollars in contributions from the campaign fund controlled by Michael J. Madigan, the Speaker of the Illinois House and chairman of the Democratic Party of Illinois. In October, 2010, Berrios' campaign committee contributed $50,000 to her father's campaign for Assessor.

Berrios has been a member of the Illinois Legislative Latino Caucus Foundation since its founding in 2004. In forming the Foundation, each of the Hispanic Representatives in the Illinois House selected a member of its board of directors, and Berrios selected lobbyist Alfred Ronan of Ronan Potts LLC. For two years, the group failed to register and file financial reports with the State of Illinois and was fined. Ronan Potts LLC paid a $350,000 fine after admitted to a multimillion-dollar bid-rigging scheme in the expansion of McCormick Place. Berrios chairs the Board of Hispanic Caucus Chairs, a national organization of Hispanic legislative caucus leadership from 12 U. S. states and territories.

On February 14, 2013, Illinois Senate Bill SB10, the "Religious Freedom and Marriage Fairness Act," legalizing same-sex marriage in Illinois, passed the Illinois Senate, was introduced into the Illinois House, and had its first reading in the Illinois House. On March 12, 2013 Berrios was added as an Alternate Co-Sponsor of SB10 in the Illinois House of Representatives. She was one of 24 Representatives to sign on as Chief Sponsor, Alternate Chief Co-sponsor, or Alternate Co-Sponsor, and one of 19 Alternate Co-Sponsors, in the Illinois House. The Illinois House passed SB10 and Illinois Governor Pat Quinn signed the bill into law in November, 2013.

In the Illinois House, Berrios chaired the Financial Institutions committee and was a member of the Executive, Insurance, International Trade and Commerce, Mass Transit, Tollway Oversight, Tourism and Conventions, and Biotechnology committees.

Berrios conceded defeat in the March 18, 2014 primary election in which she sought re-election to a seventh term. Capitol Fax editor Rich Miller called the primary "the ugliest race in Illinois."

== Personal life ==
Berrios is a former member of the Board of Directors of the Girl Scouts of Chicago. She is on the Board of Directors of Tabula Rasa, a proposed transitional living program to address serial incarceration of male high school and college students.

On June 15, 2023, Berrios' husband James Weiss would be convicted in a bribery case which also involved two Illinois state legislators, Terry Link and Luis Arroyo. On October 11, 2023, Weiss would be sentenced to 5 1/2 years in prison. On October 16, 2024, Weiss' brother Joseph would receive a 60 day prison sentenced after pleading guilty in May 2024 to one count of one count of making false statements to federal agents after lying to the FBI and IRS about the Berrios son-in-law's ties to the late Chicago mobster Frank “The German” Schweihs. Weiss, who is currently serving his prison sentence at a federal prison facility in Minnesota, is not due to be released until August 2028.
