= Muscular Islam =

Philosophy promoting physical fitness

Muscular Islam is a sometimes used term to describe the push for physical fitness amongst Muslims.

== History ==
=== Pre-colonial era ===
Furusiyya, an ancient equestrian practice in the Muslim world, is argued by Birgit Krawietz to have been an early form of muscular Islam, with Turkish heritage wrestling being a modern-day extant furusiyya practice and major aspect of muscular Islam as practiced in Turkey.

=== Colonial era ===
In Algeria and the Middle East, muscular Islam was promoted as a way of encouraging physical fitness, masculinity, and strength to execute anti-colonial resistance, as well as helping in nation-building and the encouragement of patriotism throughout the region.

=== Post-colonial era ===
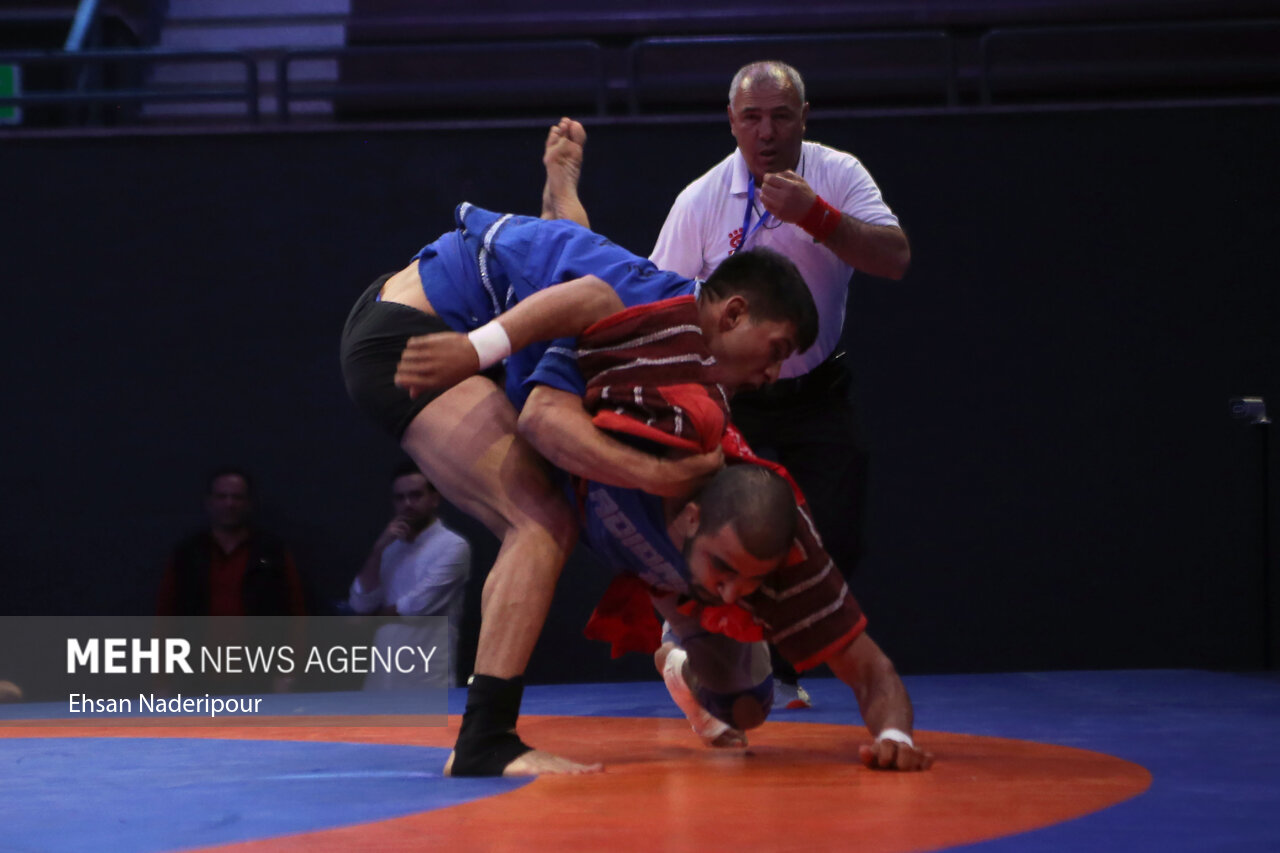
A modern Iranian wrestling competition in action. Iranian heritage wrestling was promoted by the state during the 1980s onwards.

In Indonesia, muscular Islam and the need for a return to Islamic values by any means necessary, including jihad, was promoted by Sekarmadji Maridjan Kartosoewirjo, who led revolts against the national government as Imam of Darul Islam in the early post-colonial era.

In Iran, muscular Islam was the dominant state philosophy towards sporting activities in the 1980s and 90s, with traditional sports such as pahlevani and zoorkhaneh rituals taking center stage, and activities such as chess being banned because of their alleged association with gambling.

== Within various communities ==
=== Muslim diaspora in the West ===
Basketball has been used by the South Asian Muslim-Americans to encourage manliness.

Football has been theorized to have been played by the Muslim diaspora in Britain as a way to fight Islamophobia.
