= OPB (disambiguation) =

OPB may refer to:

- Obscene Publications Branch, a former unit of the Metropolitan Police in London, England
- Oregon Public Broadcasting, a radio and television network based in the U.S. state of Oregon
- Oregon Progress Board, a commission of the Oregon state government
- Xilinx On-chip Peripheral Bus, a low-speed bus for connecting peripherals within a Xilinx system on a chip
- In music, sometimes used as an abbreviation for "originally performed by"
- Oakridge Project Bloods, a Bloods gang in Oak Ridge, Tennessee.
