= Julia Ramirez =

American politician

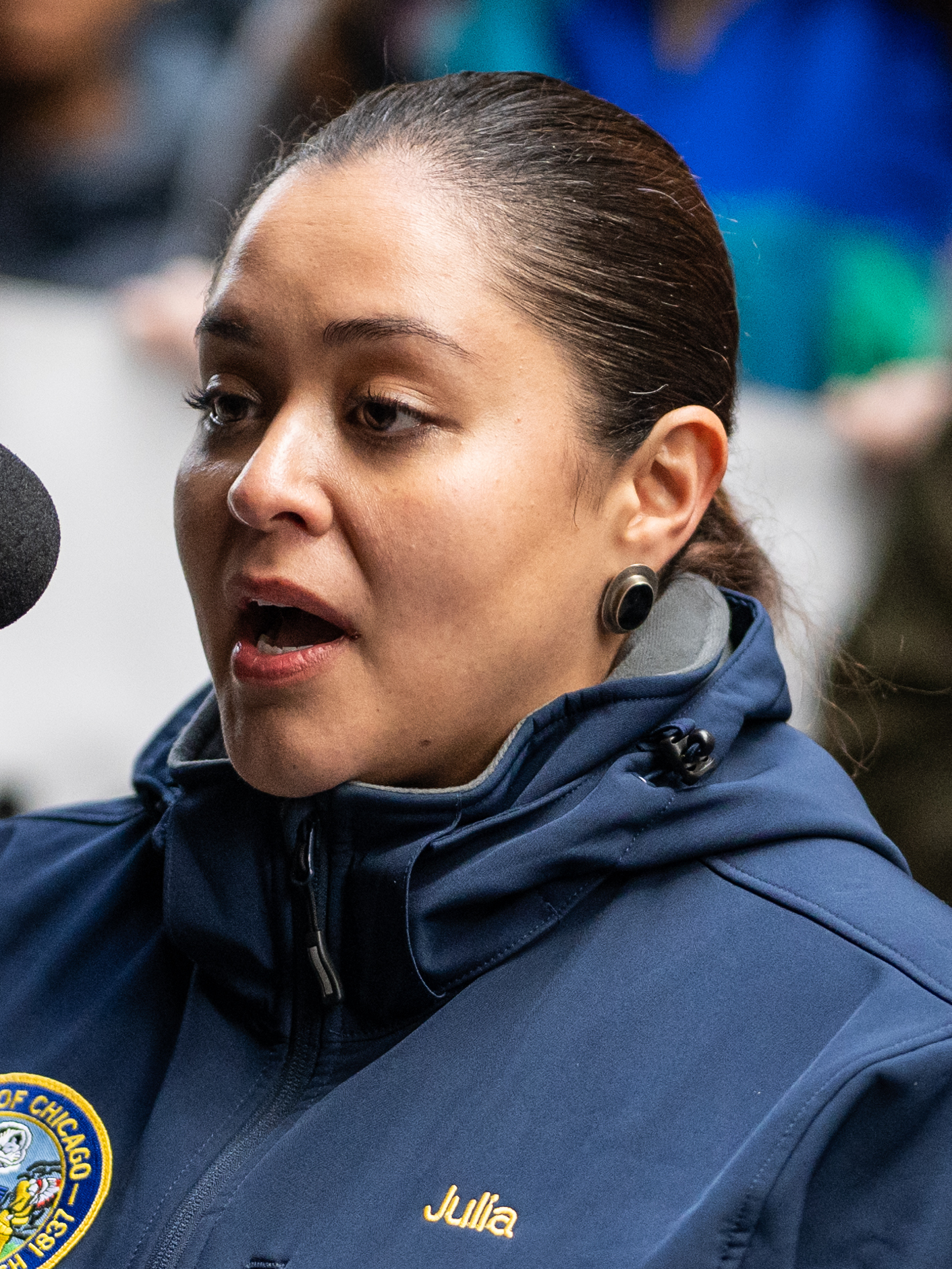
- Ramirez in 2025

Member of the Chicago City Council from the 12th ward
- Incumbent
- Assumed office May 15, 2023
- Preceded by: Anabel Abarca

Personal details
- Born: April 19, 1991 (age 35)
- Party: Democratic
- Education: Northeastern Illinois University (BA, MSW)

Julia Ramirez (born April 19, 1991) is an American politician and community organizer from Chicago. She is the alderman for Chicago City Council's 12th ward, Chicago's southwest side, which includes portions of Brighton Park, and McKinley Park. She is a member of the Democratic Party. She beat Anabel Anarca in the 2023 election for the office. She campaigned for holistic public safety strategies and implementing a “community-driven process” to vet industry and businesses. This was the first time Ramirez ran for Chicago public office. She previously worked in Chicago Public Schools as a social worker, with a background in community activism.

== Early life ==
Ramirez was born and raised in Brighton Park and currently resides in her childhood home.

Ramirez attended Catholic private schools Our Lady of Fatima and Five Holy Martyrs in Brighton Park. She attended a boarding school in California on a scholarship.

After high school, Ramirez moved back to Brighton Park and worked with Chicago nonprofits including Latinos Progresando, Instituto de Progreso Latino, BUILD Chicago, Back of the Yards Neighborhood Council, and Increase the Peace. She was a re-engagement specialist at Chicago Public Schools. She attended Northeastern Illinois University to earn her degree and license in school social work.

== Aldermanic career ==
=== October 2023 attack ===
On October 19, 2023, residents in Brighton Park protested Chicago’s mayor Brandon Johnson plans for a migrant winterized tent community in the neighborhood. Many migrants have been sleeping at Chicago Police Departments. Ramirez and an anonymous aide attended the protest “to address misinformation being spread about my involvement with the plan and how we should move forward as a community.” However, the crowds surrounded her and her aide and assaulted them.

In early December 2023, it was announced that Governor J. B. Pritzker stopped the building of the tents. This was due to environmental concerns of heavy metals and toxins. Ramirez states mixed emotions as “There were big concerns about public safety and I believe that public safety is providing people with shelter and feeding people, but we also need to make sure that it works for everybody.” Ramirez stated disappointment with the lack of communication with other Chicago politicians.

=== Stances on issues ===
During the campaign, Ramirez stated she wants to address public safety with a holistic approach, and introduce resources to act as preventive measurements for community members, such as those that provide mental health and social services. Ramirez states the need for transparency in addressing food insecurity and housing. Ramirez advocates for gun violence prevention, fully funded education with after school programs, career services, and safe public transit. Her brother, Nicholas Ramirez, was killed at 19 years old from gun violence. She also states the need of protection of the environment. In election interviews, she states plans to collaborate with the District Coordinating Officer's (DCO) and Empowering Communities for Public Safety (ECPS) council representatives to address these issues.

Ramirez is against the Chicago Housing Authority (CHA) selling land for housing for low income families to private companies. Ramirez wants to approach small contractors to provide housing to families and provide rent-to-own options.

Ramirez is against aldermanic prerogative.

== Election ==
Ramirez ran against Alderperson Anabel Abarca in the 2023 12th Ward election. Abarca had been on the city council since December of 2022 when she was appointed to the 12th Ward by Mayor Lori Lightfoot after former Ald. George Cardenas stepped down. Abarca was Ramirez’s only challenger after a third candidate was removed from the ballot. In an interview with Block Club, Ramirez said she woke up every morning to fight with her campaign centered around holistic public safety strategies and implementing a “community-driven process.” Ramirez won on February 28, 2023 with a 57 percent vote over Abarca’s 43 percent. Ramirez set up a “community needs assessment” to understand what the community of the southwest side wanted to see from her during her term. She also stated in interviews that she is proud to accomplish something the community has been voicing a need for, for a long time. Ramirez's term started on May 1, 2023 and ends May 17, 2027.

== Personal career ==
Before becoming an alderman, Ramirez worked with Chicago Public Schools as a re-engagement specialist. She was a restorative justice practitioner and social worker. Ramirez has a background in community activism. She helped immigrant communities access resources and mitigate crime. Ramirez has worked with the organization BUILD, including their wiki page.

== Electoral history ==
The May 2023- May 2027 term is Ramirez's first term in office.

2023 Chicago aldermanic election, 12th ward, first round
Party	Candidate	Votes	%
Democratic	Julia Ramirez	3,355	57.0
Democratic	Anabel Abarca (incumbent)	2,531	43.0
Total votes		5,886	100.0

== See also ==
- List of Chicago alderpersons since 1923
