= Courthorpe Clayton =

Anglo-Irish soldier, courtier and Member of Parliament

Lieutenant-Colonel Courthorpe Clayton (c. 1706 – 22 March 1762) was an Anglo-Irish soldier, courtier and Member of Parliament for Mallow.

== Family ==
He was the son of Laurence Clayton of Mallow and his second wife Anne, daughter of Sir Peter Courthorpe of Little Island. On 6 August 1745, he married Theodosia, daughter of Edward Buckworth; they had one daughter. Courthorpe lived at Annabella near Mallow in County Cork and at Shepherd's Bush in Middlesex.

== Soldier ==
Commissioned as an ensign in the Coldstream Guards in 1725, he transferred to the Royal Horse Guards as a cornet in 1727 and became a lieutenant in the 1st Troop of Horse Grenadier Guards in 1731. In 1751 he was promoted to major and in 1756 to lieutenant-colonel.

== Courtier ==
In 1726 Courthorpe was appointed an equerry to the Prince of Wales, and served in the same capacity through the whole of the Prince's reign as King George II from 1727 to 1760. He was avener and clerk marshal from 1732 to 1734 and 1757 to 1760. In January 1761 he was granted a pension of £500 a year.

== Member of Parliament ==
He was elected to the Irish House of Commons for Mallow in 1727 and (through the influence of Lord Cornwallis) to the British House of Commons for Eye on 5 May 1749, sitting until the dissolution of both Parliaments on the King's death in 1760. He was described by Lord Dupplin as a supporter of the Government in 1754 but is not known to have ever spoken or voted.
