= Anabelle =

Anabelle is a feminine given name.

Notable people with this given name:

- Anabelle Acosta, Cuban-American actress
- Anabelle Ghabach, Australian association football player
- Anabelle Langlois, Canadian pair skater
- Anabelle Prawerman, French beach volleyball player
- Anabelle Rodríguez, Puerto Rican judge
- Anabelle Savabaddy, Mauritian politician
- Anabelle Smith, Australian diver

== See also ==
- Anabel (disambiguation)
  - Anabel, given name
- Annabel (disambiguation)
  - Annabelle (given name)
