= Annabelle Jaramillo =

American politician

Benton County Commissioner, Position 3
- In office January 2001 – January 2021
- Constituency: Benton County, Oregon

Personal details
- Born: Colorado
- Party: Democratic
- Spouse: Richard Medley
- Education: Portland State University
- Profession: County Commissioner and Forester

Annabelle Jaramillo (born 1940 or 1941) is a retired Latina American politician from the state of Oregon. She served on the Board of Commissioners of Benton County for five terms, from 2001 to 2021. Jaramillo was one of the first Latinas to hold elected office in Oregon. While in office, she was a strong advocate for minority and LGBTQ civil rights.

== Early life and education ==
In the late 1940s, Jaramillo's mother attempted to enroll her in third grade in Colorado, only to find that the school was racially segregated. Her mother immediately staged a brief sit-in and successfully pushed the school to integrate. Jaramillo became the first student of color in her classroom. This experience inspired Jaramillo to support civil rights and LGBT rights throughout her life.

Jaramillo has bachelor's and master's degrees in biology from Portland State University.

== Career ==
=== Early career ===
Jaramillo's initial career was as a research botanist for the US Forest Service. In that role, she gradually became more involved in diversity, equity, and inclusion efforts for Forest Service employees. She eventually became the president of National Image Inc., an organization that advocated for equal employment opportunities for Hispanics in the federal government. Jaramillo then moved on to a number of managerial positions in Oregon's state government, including serving as Citizens' Representative for Governor John Kitzhaber, from 1995 to 2000 and as the executive director of the Oregon Commission on Hispanic Affairs.

=== Political career ===
Jaramillo served on the Board of Commissioners of Benton County for five terms, from 2001 to 2021.

=== Volunteer ===
Jaramillo has been a member of numerous public and nonprofit boards. She served as president of the Oregon Women's Political Caucus. She also served on the Oregon Progress Board, the Oregon Sustainability Board, and the Federal Forestlands Advisory Committee.

== LGBT rights advocacy ==
In 1991, Jaramillo managed a successful campaign in Corvallis to defeat a discriminatory charter amendment promoted by the Oregon Citizens Alliance. In 2004, Jaramillo and fellow Benton County Commissioner Linda Modrell voted (2–1) for the county to begin issuing marriage licenses to same-sex couples, following Multnomah County's lead and in defiance of requests by Governor Ted Kulongoski and Attorney General Hardy Myers. Following threats of arrest by the Attorney General, the Benton County Commission voted (3–0) to instead to stop issuing all marriage licenses - straight and gay. Benton County only resumed issuing marriage licenses to straight couples five months later, following a court order. Jaramillo later reflected, "If we were going to end up with discrimination, we weren't going to issue marriage licenses to anyone."

== Electoral history ==
1988 Oregon House of Representatives 34th district election
Party	Candidate	Votes	%	±%
Republican	John Schoon (incumbent)	11,602	62.65%	
Democratic	Annabelle Jaramillo	6,915	37.34%	
Independent	Miscellaneous	1	0.00%	
Total votes		18,518	100.00%	

1998 Benton County Commissioner, Position 1 Democratic primary
Party	Candidate	Votes	%	±%
Democratic	Linda Modrell	3,103	46.18%	
Democratic	Annabelle Jaramillo	2,709	40.32%	
Democratic	George C. Gorsch	882	13.13%	
Democratic	Write-ins	25	0.37%	
Total votes		6,719	100.00%	

2000 Benton County Commissioner, Position 3 election
Party	Candidate	Votes	%	±%
Democratic	Annabelle Jaramillo	17,894	51.39%	
Republican	Carolyn Oakley	16,809	48.28%	
Independent	Write-ins	114	0.33%	
Total votes		34,817	100.00%	

2004 Benton County Commissioner, Position 3 election
Party	Candidate	Votes	%	±%
Democratic	Annabelle Jaramillo (incumbent)	23,188	55.99%	
Republican	David E. Smith	18,123	43.76%	
Independent	Write-ins	106	0.26%	
Total votes		41,417	100.00%	

2008 Benton County Commissioner, Position 3 election
Party	Candidate	Votes	%	±%
Democratic	Annabelle Jaramillo (incumbent)	24,344	60.80%	
Republican	Chris Nusbaum	15,549	38.83%	
Independent	Write-ins	148	0.37%	
Total votes		40,041	100.00%	

2012 Benton County Commissioner, Position 3 election
Party	Candidate	Votes	%	±%
Democratic	Annabelle Jaramillo (incumbent)	23,263	59.35%	
Republican	Betsy Close	15,767	40.23%	
Independent	Write-ins	165	0.42%	
Total votes		39,195	100.00%	

2016 Benton County Commissioner, Position 3 election
Party	Candidate	Votes	%	±%
Democratic	Annabelle Jaramillo (incumbent)	23,062	52.86%	
Republican	Paul Cauthorn	16,962	38.88%	
Pacific Green	Timothy L Dehne	3,490	8.00%	
Independent	Write-ins	117	0.27%	
Total votes		43,631	100.00%	
