= Anabel Ternès =

German author, professor

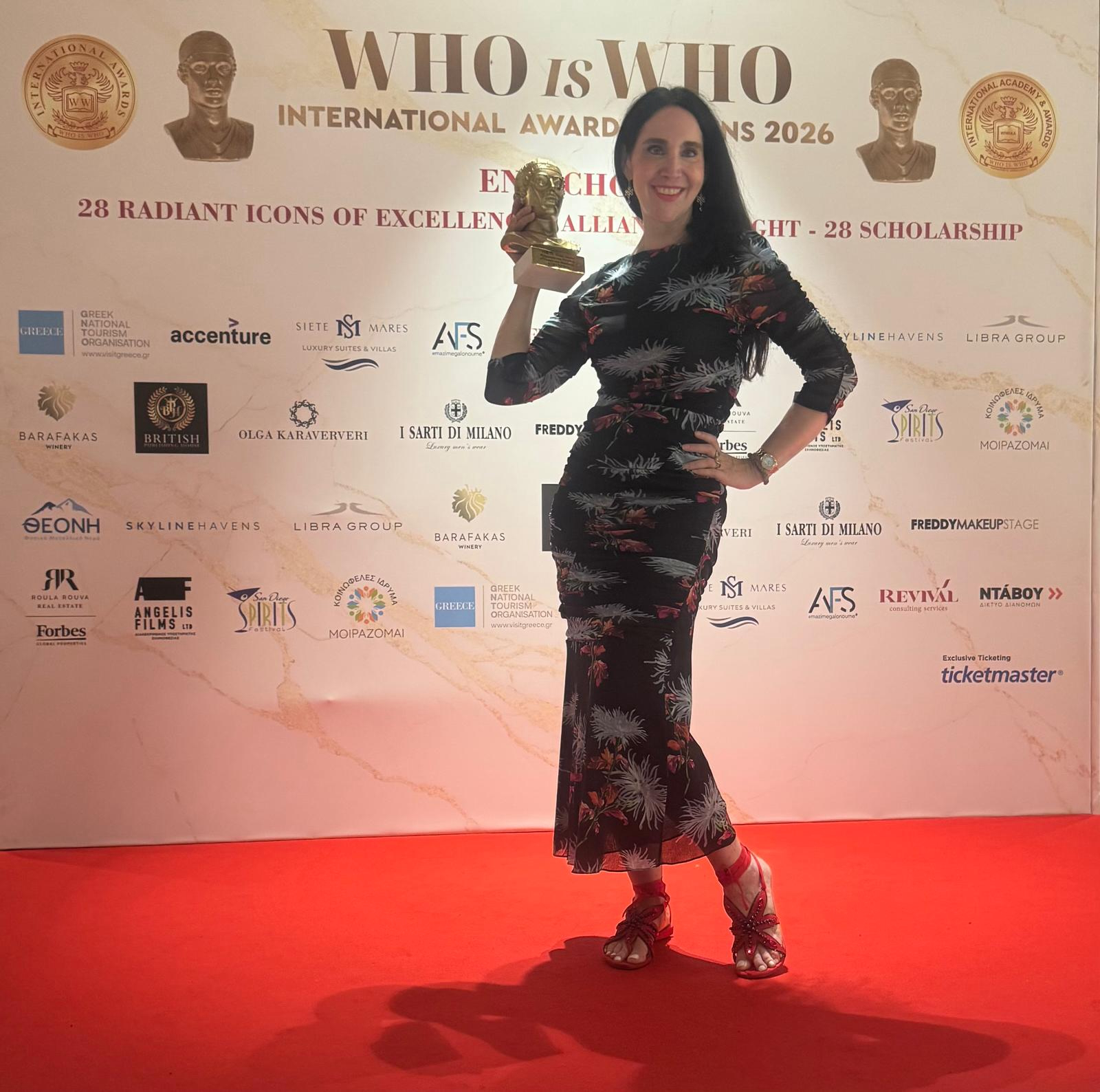
- Anabel Ternès
- Born: Anabel Cäcilia Ternès von Hattburg; Bonn, North Rhine-Westphalia, West Germany
- Other names: Anabel Princess of Prussia – Ternès von Hattburg; Anabel Cäcilia Princess of Prussia – Ternès von Hattburg
- Occupations: professor of International Business Administration, author
- Title: Prof. Dr. Phil.

Academic background
- Education: University of Osnabrück, University of Hagen, Otto von Guericke University Magdeburg
- Thesis: (2004)
- Doctoral advisor: Peter Lang

Academic work
- Discipline: Business Administration, Communication studies
- Sub-discipline: Futures studies

Anabel Ternès (also known as Anabel Cäcilia Ternès von Hattburg, born in Bonn) is a German entrepreneur, author, and professor of international business administration at the private university SRH Berlin University of Applied Sciences.

== Early life and career ==
After completing her schooling, Ternès initially studied German Studies, Catholic Theology, and History at the University of Osnabrück. She also obtained her first and second state examinations for teaching in the subjects of German, Catholic Religion, and History through an additional exam. Ternès completed a degree in business administration at the University of Hagen, graduating as a Diplom-Kauffrau (equivalent to a Master of Commerce). Furthermore, she earned a diploma in Education at the University of Osnabrück while working. In 2004, Ternès received her doctorate in German Studies from the Otto von Guericke University Magdeburg, being awarded the title Dr. phil.

On June 1, 2008, Ternès left her executive position in sales for Central Europe at Samsonite NV, Belgium, to become the sales manager of the men's underwear brand Hom (Triumph International AG).

In 2012, Ternès took over the management of the International Institute for Sustainability Management (IISM) at the SRH Berlin University of Applied Sciences. This role involves research in the fields of digitization, as well as business establishment and development. Since 2012, she has held a professorship in Communication Management, International Business Administration, and Digitization at SRH Berlin.

In 2016, Ternès, together with Julian Maar, founded a platform for mental health. In the same year, Ternès also established the non-profit organization GetYourWings to promote sustainable and digital competencies. In early 2017, along with Maar, she founded the company Co-Carrier, a delivery network for private individuals.

In September 2021, Kai Wegner – the CDU's top candidate for the Abgeordnetenhaus of Berlin election representing a designated CDU-SPD government – announced that Ternès was intended to be the Education Senator in the new CDU-SPD government.

== Focus areas ==
Ternès teaches as a professor in the areas of sustainability and digitization. She is also the director of the International Institute for Sustainability Management at the SRH Berlin University of Applied Sciences. Another focus of her work is the area of corporate leadership. Within this area she participated in a panel discussion at the Frankfurt Book Fair 2022 on the topic of sustainable business.

Ternès is also active in the field of futures studies. In 2025, she attended the Schwäbisch Gmünd Education Conference and spoke on the concept of Futures Literacy, a framework that involves developing the ability to recognize and use different possible futures in learning processes.

== Personal life ==
By marriage to Gert-Friedrich Prince of Prussia, Ternès additionally adopted the name Princess of Prussia. She married Georg Haub in her second marriage on May 24, 2018. She has a son and lives in Berlin.

== Selected publications ==
=== Author of Specialized Books ===
- 30 Minuten wirkungsvoll kommunizieren. Gabal, Offenbach 2015, ISBN 978-3-86936-675-3.
- Orientierungsmodelle und Digitalisierung. Kommunikationsprozesse im Wandel. De Gruyter, Berlin, Boston 2019, ISBN 978-3-11-064444-9.
- Ferngesteuert?! Hin zur Digitalen Souveränität. Springer, Heidelberg 2021. ISBN 978-3-662-62970-3.
- 30 Minuten Digitale Souveränität. Gabal, Offenbach 2022, ISBN 978-3-86936-675-3.
- Los, jetzt: Nachhaltig führen = Zukunft gewinnen. Haufe, 2023.
- 30 Minuten Arbeitgeberattraktivität. Gabal, 2024.
- Der Genetische Glückscode. Mein Schlüssel zu Selbstliebe, Lebensfreude und jugendlicher Ausstrahlung. Remote Verlag, 2025.

=== As co-author ===
- with Dunja Ewinger, Juliane Koerbel, Ian Towers: Arbeitswelt im Zeitalter der Individualisierung. Trends: Multigrafie und Multi-Option in der Generation Y. Springer Gabler, Wiesbaden 2016. ISBN 978-3-658-12752-7.
- with Benjamin Klenke, Marc Jerusel, and Bastian Schmidtbleicher: Integriertes Betriebliches Gesundheitsmanagement. Sensibilisierungs-, Kommunikations- und Motivationsstrategien. Springer Gabler, Wiesbaden 2017, ISBN 978-3-658-14639-9.
- with Susanne Bachmann: Effiziente Krisenkommunikation – transparent und authentisch. Springer Gabler, Wiesbaden 2017. ISBN 978-3-658-34882-3
- with Hans-Peter Hagemes: Die Digitalisierung frisst ihre User. Der digitale Wahnsinn und wie Sie ihn beherrschen, Springer Fachmedien, Wiesbaden 2018, ISBN 978-3-658-21361-9.
- with Peter Spiegel, Arndt Pechstein, and Annekathrin Grünberg: Future Skills. 30 zukunftsentscheidende Kompetenzen und wie wir sie lernen können, Vahlen, Munich 2021. ISBN 978-3-8006-6635-5
- Ternès, A.; Wilke-de Senarclens de Grancy, C.-W. (2023): Agenda HR – Digitalisierung, Arbeit 4.0, New Leadership. 2nd expanded edition. Springer Gabler.
- Ternès von Hattburg, A.; Holland, H.; Aigner, L.; Wegner, K. (eds.; 2025): Wir schaffen Zukunft. Vahlen.

=== Specialist contributions ===
- Wenn Digitalisierung mehr als ökonomischer Selbstzweck sein soll. Digitale Lernformate zur Optimierung individuellen lebenslangen Lernens. In: Gabal e. V. (Ed.): Digital Strategies in Training. 11 Impulses for Digital Teaching and Learning Formats in Training and Further Education. Jünger Medien Verlag Gabal, Offenbach 2020. Pp. 80–89. ISBN 978-3-7664-9966-0.
- Generationswechsel. In Rainer Gröber & Inga Dransfeld-Haase (Eds.): Strategic HR Work in Transformation – Participation and Co-Determination for Successful HRM. Bund-Verlag, Frankfurt am Main 2021. ISBN 978-3-7663-7156-0.
- Recruiting 4.0. Den passenden Mitarbeiter für den digitalen Wandel finden und erfolgreich binden. In: Basics of Further Education – Practical Aids. GdW-Ph. Update delivery No. 185, May 2020, Art. 50521185. Luchterhand, Munich 2020. Pp. 1–37. ISBN 978-3-472-50520-4.
- Krise, Chance, Disruption. Was ein erfolgreiches New Leadership jetzt leisten muss. In: Harwardt, M., Niermann, P., Schmutte, A. M., Steuernagel, A. (Eds.): Learning in the Age of Digitization. Springer Gabler, Wiesbaden 2023. Pp. 3–17. ISBN 978-3-658-37900-1.
- Ternès von Hattburg, A. (2024): Soziale Nachhaltigkeit: Ihre fundamentale Bedeutung für Unternehmen und Gesellschaft. In: Kraus, S.; Plugmann, P. (Eds.): Nachhaltigkeit ermöglichen. Vom Buzzword zur gelebten Praxis – Transformationsbeispiele aus verschiedenen Branchen. Springer, Wiesbaden 2024. Pp. 115–130.
- Ternès von Hattburg, A. (2025): Hilfe Multidiversity! Wie unsere Individualität, unser Lebensstil und unsere Lebensumstände New Work und Arbeitsschutz vor Herausforderungen stellen. In: Knappertsbusch, I.; von Gilsa, L. (Eds.): New Work und Arbeitsschutz: Sicherheit und Gesundheit in der neuen Arbeitswelt. Springer, Wiesbaden 2025.
- Ternès von Hattburg, A. (2025): Wie Betriebliches Gesundheitsmanagement (BGM) Organisationen stärkt: Herausforderungen, Chancen und Good Practice. In: Flothow, A.; Liechtenstein, S.; Feller, A. (Eds.): Betriebliche Gesundheitsförderung für Ernährungsfachkräfte. Springer, Wiesbaden 2025. Pp. 71–83.
- Ternès von Hattburg, A. (2025): Green HR und Leadership. In: Heller-Herold, G.; Link, P. (Eds.): Das Sustainability Toolbook. Haufe, München 2025. Pp. 252–268.

=== Co-editor ===
- with Argang Ghadiri, Theo Peters: Trends im Betrieblichen Gesundheitsmanagement. Ansätze aus Forschung und Praxis. Springer Gabler, Wiesbaden 2016, ISBN 978-3-658-07977-2.
- with Clarissa-Diana Wilke: Agenda HR – Digitalisierung, Arbeit 4.0, New Leadership. Was Personalverantwortliche und Management jetzt nicht verpassen sollten, Springer Fachmedien, Wiesbaden 2018, ISBN 978-3-658-21180-6.
- with Marco Englert: Nachhaltiges Management. Nachhaltigkeit als exzellenten Managementansatz entwickeln, Springer Gabler, Wiesbaden 2019, ISBN 978-3-662-57692-2.
- with Matthias Schäfer: Digitalpakt – was nun? Ideen und Konzepte für zukunftsorientiertes Lernen, Springer VS, Wiesbaden 2020, ISBN 978-3-658-25529-9.
- with Wolfgang Grenke: Nachhaltigkeit heißt für uns Verantwortung: Tipps und Mut machende Erzählungen von erfolgreichen Unternehmer:innen und Gründer:innen, 2023, ISBN 978-3-658-40021-7.
- with Wolfgang Grenke: Nachhaltigkeit heißt für uns Verantwortung: Tipps und Mut machende Erzählungen von erfolgreichen Unternehmer:innen und Gründer:innen. Springer Gabler, Wiesbaden 2023. ISBN 978-3-658-40021-7.
