= Annabelle Boettcher =

German scientist

- Born: 1961 (age 64–65)
- Citizenship: Germany
- Education: Institut Francais d'Etudes Arabes de Damas
- Occupations: Political scientist, professor
- Employer: University of Southern Denmark

Annabelle Boettcher is a German professor, expert on Syria and advisor for the humanitarian aid industry.

== Biography ==
Annabelle Boettcher studied political science, law, and Islamic studies in Toulouse, Munich, Freiburg, Beirut, and Damascus. From 1993 to 1997, she was affiliated with the Institut Francais d'Études Arabes de Damas in Damaskus, at the Université Saint Joseph in Beirut and at the Orient-Institut Beirut for her PhD on Sunni state Islam in Syria. She also studied at the Sharia Faculty of Damascus and with a number of Syrian Muslim male and female scholars such as the Naqshbandiyya Shaikh Ahmed Kuftaro, the former Grandmufti of Syria. She published her PhD in German and English. Later she continued her research on Islamic networks with Grandayatollah Mohammad Hussein Fadlallah in Lebanon. Recently, she worked on Islamic culture and health and published a book on spiritual medicine in Muslim Health Management with Birgit Krawietz.

She taught and researched at the Freie Universität in Berlin, Indonesia, Sorbonne University in Paris, Harvard University in Cambridge, MA, and submitted her habilitation in 2006 at the Freie Universität Berlin about transnational Islamic networks. She was guest professor for European Islam at the University of Vienna.

She consulted private and public institutions, and was also a contributor to the Neue Zürcher Zeitung.

From 2005 to 2015, she worked as an advisor for humanitarian access, security and frontline negotiations with armed non-state actors for the International Committee of the Red Cross in Iraq, Jordan, Yemen, Niger, Bangladesh, Switzerland, Jordan, Lebanon, Syria, and Turkey.

From August 2017 to January 2020 she was a professor at the Center for Contemporary Middle East Studies of the Syddansk Universitet in Odense, Denmark. In February 2020 she started to work as a vice-rector and dean of the Faculty for Social Work at the Baden-Württemberg Cooperative State University in Villingen-Schwenningen in Baden-Württemberg, Germany, where she also teaches as a professor.

She is a fellow of the Robert Bosch Stiftung in the SCIANA - The Health Leaders Network, a European network for health leaders, which is sponsored by the Robert Bosch Stiftung in Germany, The Health Foundation in England and the CAREUM Foundation in Switzerland.

== Books ==
- Syrische Religionspolitik unter Asad. Freiburg: ABI, Arnold-Bergstraesser-Institut, 1998.
- Official Sunni and Shi'i Islam in Syria. Florence: European University Institute, 2002.
- Mit Turban und Handy: Scheich Nazim al-Qubrusi und sein transnationales Sufinetzwerk. Würzburg: Ergon Verlag, 2011. ISBN 978-3-89913-857-3 (Habilitationsschrift, FU Berlin, 2006).
- Syria's Sunni Islam under Hafiz al-Asad. E-book, Kindle-Amazon Edition, November 2015.
- Islampolitik in Syrien von 1961 bis 1996. E-Buch. Kindle-Amazon Edition, October 2015.
- Islam, Migration and Jinn: Spiritual Medicine in Muslim Health Management. Böttcher, Annabelle, Krawietz, Birgit (Eds.). Palgrave Macmillan 2021.
