= Anabel Abarca =

American politician

Member of the Chicago City Council from the 12th ward
- In office December 14, 2022 – May 15, 2023
- Appointed by: Lori Lightfoot
- Preceded by: George Cardenas
- Succeeded by: Julia Ramirez

Personal details
- Party: Democratic
- Education: DePaul University (BA); Arizona State University, Tempe (MPA); Loyola University Chicago (JD)

Anabel Abarca is an American politician, who served in the Chicago City Council as alderman for the 12th ward from 2022 to 2023. She was appointed to the position by Mayor Lori Lightfoot and confirmed by the City Council in December 2022, following the retirement of George Cardenas. She ran for re-election to a full term, but lost to Julia Ramirez. The 12th ward is on Chicago's southwest side, and includes portions of Brighton Park, McKinley Park, and Little Village.

== Early life and education ==
Abarca is a native of the Northwest Side of Chicago, and is the daughter of Mexican immigrants. She graduated from Taft High School in Norwood Park, and subsequently earned a bachelor's degree from DePaul University, a Master of Public Administration degree from Arizona State University, and a Juris Doctor degree from Loyola University Chicago School of Law.

== Early legal and political career ==
Abarca worked on Tammy Duckworth's congressional campaign in 2011, and served as an aide to U.S. Representative Mike Quigley. She later served on the boards of several non-profit organizations. From 2012 to 2016, she served as chief of staff for 12th ward alderman George Cardenas.

== Chicago City Council ==
In June 2022, Cardenas announced his intention to resign later in the year after winning a primary for a seat on the Cook County Board of Review. Abarca was one of four people who applied to fill the position for the remainder of the term, and was selected for appointment by Mayor Lori Lightfoot on December 12, 2022. The City Council approved her appointment in a 44–0 vote on December 14. She named public safety and city services as her top priorities upon taking office. Abarca was a candidate for a full term in the 2023 election and was endorsed by Cardenas, but lost to challenger Julia Ramirez.

== Personal life ==
Abaraca has lived in the McKinley Park neighborhood of Chicago since 2015.

== Electoral history ==
2023 Chicago aldermanic election, 12th ward, first round
Party	Candidate	Votes	%
Democratic	Julia Ramirez	3,355	57.0
Democratic	Anabel Abarca (incumbent)	2,531	43.0
Total votes		5,886	100.0
