= Annabella =

- Gender: Female

Other names
- See also: Anna, Annabel, Anabela

Annabella, Anabella, or Anabela is a feminine given name. Notable people with the name include:

- Annabella of Scotland (c. 1433–1509), daughter of King James I
- Annabella (actress) (1907–1996), stage name of French actress Suzanne Georgette Charpentier
- Anabela Atijas (born 1975), Serbian pop singer known mononymously as Anabela
- Anabela Basalo (born 1972), Serbian writer
- Anabela Braz Pires (born 1976), Portuguese singer known mononymously as Anabela
- Anabella Castro, Colombian model
- Anabela Cossa (born 1986), Mozambican basketball player
- Anabela Đogani (born 1975), Bosnian-Serbian singer
- Anabella Drummond (c. 1350–1401), Queen Consort of Scotland
- Anabella Fanale (born 2007), American ice hockey player
- Annabella Hantov (born 2008), American rhythmic gymnast
- Annabella Lwin (born 1966), Anglo-Burmese lead singer of Bow Wow Wow who sometimes records under the name "Annabella"
- Annabella Piugattuk (born 1982), Canadian actress
- Anabela Miranda Rodrigues (born 1954), Portuguese politician
- Annabella Sciorra (born 1964), American actress
- Anabela Sousa Rodrigues (born 1972), Portuguese politician and psychologist
- Bella Thorne (born 1997), American actress, dancer, singer, and model

== See also ==
- Annabel (disambiguation)
- Bella (disambiguation)
