= Marcel Mouloudji =

French singer and actor

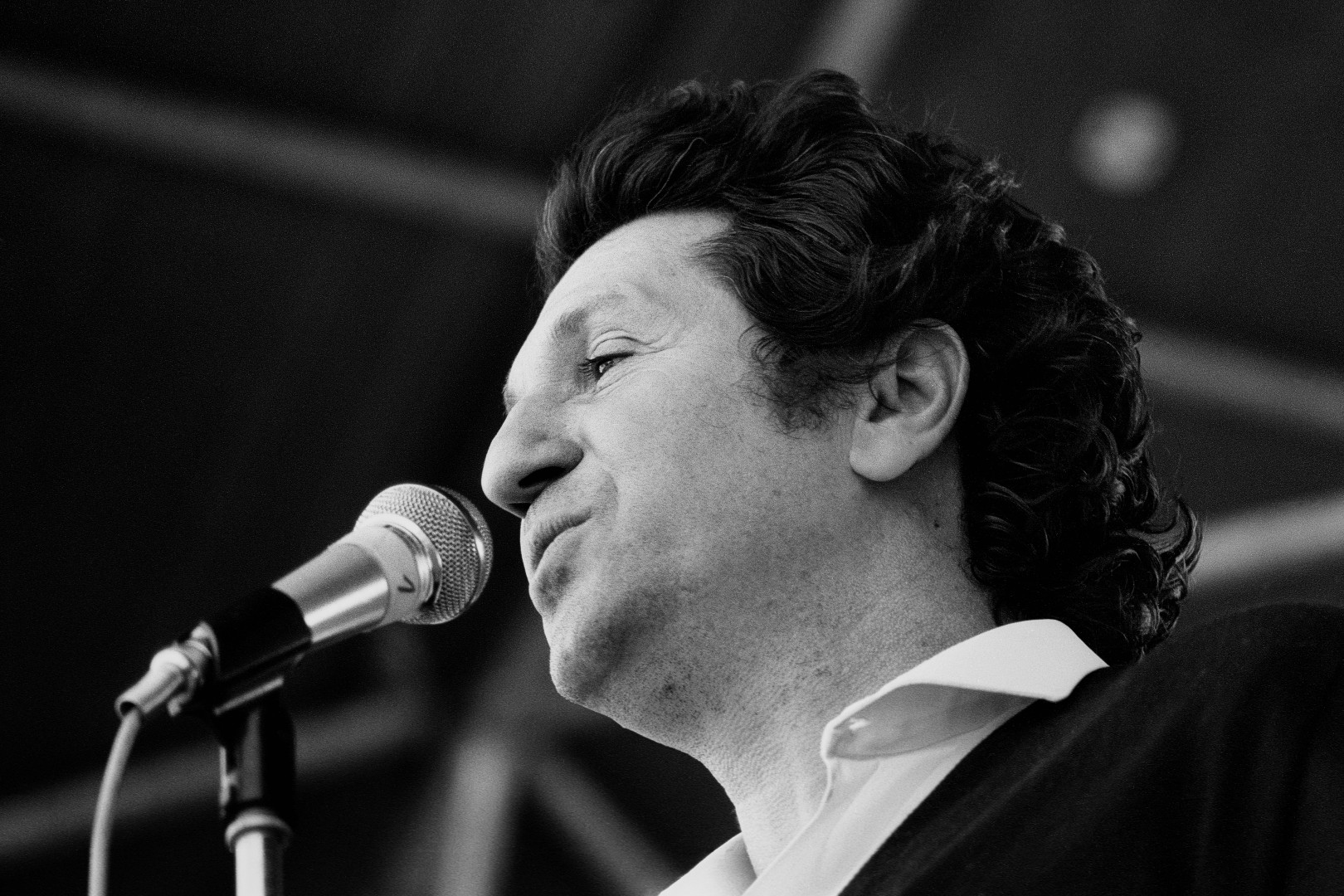
Mouloudji in 1973

Marcel André Mouloudji (16 September 1922 – 14 June 1994) was a French singer, actor, and writer who was born in Paris and died in Neuilly-sur-Seine. He sang songs written by Boris Vian and Jacques Prévert.

== Personal life ==
Mouloudji was born to Algerian Kabyle Saïd Mouloudji and Breton Eugénie Roux.

Mouloudji had two children: Grégory Mouloudji with Lilia Lejpune and Annabelle Mouloudji with Nicolle Tessier.

== Prizes and Honors ==
- 1944: Prix de la Pléiade for his novel Enrico
- 1953 : Grand Prix du disque de l’Académie Charles-Cros for the song, Comme un p'tit coquelicot.

== Partial filmography ==
- 1936: Jenny – Le Chanteur des rues
- 1936: La guerre des gosses – La Crique
- 1936: Ménilmontant – Toto
- 1937: In Venice, One Night – Le jeune Toto
- 1937: Claudine at School – Mouloud
- 1938: Mirages – Groom
- 1938: Les Disparus de Saint-Agil – Philippe Macroix
- 1938: Les gaietés de l'exposition
- 1939: L'Entraîneuse – Le cancre (uncredited)
- 1939: Le grand élan – Pierrot
- 1941: L'Enfer des anges – Le jeune Léon
- 1941: Premier bal – Le télégraphiste
- 1942: The Strangers in the House – Ephraïm (Amédé) Luska
- 1943: Les Roquevillard – Le garçon de la pension italienne (uncredited)
- 1943: Adieu Léonard – Le ramoneur (uncredited)
- 1943: Vautrin – Calvi (uncredited)
- 1944: L'Ange de la nuit – Un étudiant (uncredited)
- 1945: Boule de suif – Un franc-tireur (uncredited)
- 1945: Les Cadets de l'océan – Passicot
- 1947: Le Bataillon du ciel – Le Canaque
- 1947: Les jeux sont faits – Lucien Derjeu
- 1948: Bagarres – Tête blonde – Angelin
- 1949: La Maternelle – Paulo
- 1949: Les Eaux troubles – Ernest
- 1950: La souricière – Mouton
- 1950: Blonde – Bernard
- 1950: Justice est faite – Amadeo, le valet de ferme des Malingré
- 1951: La maison Bonnadieu – Le chanteur des rues (uncredited)
- 1951: Gigolo – Ernest
- 1952: Nous sommes tous des assassins – René Le Guen
- 1952: Trois femmes – Raoul (segment "Mouche")
- 1952: Jouons le jeu – le chanteur (segment 'L'orgueil')
- 1953: The Virtuous Scoundrel – Le chanteur
- 1953: Boum sur Paris – Marcel Mouloudji
- 1954: Il Letto – Ricky (segment "Riviera-Express")
- 1954: Tout chante autour de moi – Georges
- 1957: Until the Last One – Le forain Quedchi
- 1958: Rafles sur la ville – Lucien Donati, dit "Le Niçois"
- 1959: 58.2/B (Short) – Récitant / Narrator
- 1959: Llegaron dos hombres – Angel Garcia
- 1962: La Planque – Georges

== Songs ==
- "Rue de Lappe"
- "Comme un p'tit coquelicot"
- "Un jour tu verras"
- "Le Déserteur"
- "Jouez mariachis"
- "La Chanson de Tessa"
- "Les Rues de Paris"
- "L'Amour, l'Amour, l'Amour"
- "Merci"
