= Anabelle Lee =

Anabelle Lee or similar may refer to:

== People ==
- Annabel Lee (musician), violinist
- Annabelle Lee (1922–2008), American baseball pitcher

== Songs ==
- "Annabel Lee", a song by Tiger Army from their 2001 album, Tiger Army II: Power of Moonlite (track #9)
- "Annabel Lee", a song by Lucyfire from their 2001 album This Dollar Saved My Life at Whitehorse
- "Annabel Lee", a song by Black Rebel Motorcycle Club from their 2010 album, Beat the Devil's Tattoo
- "Annabel Lee", a song by Stevie Nicks, adapted from Edgar Allan Poe, from her 2011 album, In Your Dreams
- "Anna Belle Lee", a song by Greg Kihn, on his 1989 album Kihnsolidation
- "Anna Belle Lee" a.k.a. "Another New World", a song by Josh Ritter, on his 2010 album So Runs the World Away

== Other ==
- "Annabel Lee", a poem by Edgar Allan Poe
- Annabell Lee (film), a film based on the poem by Edgar Allan Poe
- Annabelle Lee, character in The General (1926 film), played by Marion Mack
