= Anabel Torres =

Colombian poet and translator (born 1948)

- Born: December 28, 1948 (age 77)
- Education: University of Antioquia
- Alma mater: Institute of Social Studies
- Occupations: Poet and translator
- Writing career
- Notable works: Casi poesía, La mujer del esquimal, Las bocas del amor
- Notable awards: Poetry National Awards, University of Nariño, Poetry National Awards, University of Antioquia, Roldanillo Poetry National Awards, Ediciones Embalaje, Museo Rayo

Anabel Torres Restrepo (born 28 December 1948) is a Colombian poet and translator.

She studied Modern Languages at the University of Antioquia in Medellín and obtained a masters at the Institute of Social Studies in The Hague. She was assistant director at the National Library of Colombia (Biblioteca Nacional de Colombia).

== Works ==
- Casi poesía (1975)
- La mujer del esquimal (1981)
- Las bocas del amor (1982)
- Poemas (1987)
- Medias nonas (1992)
- Poemas de guerra (Barcelona, 2000)
- En un abrir y cerrar de hojas (Zaragoza, España, 2001)
- Agua herida (2004)
- El origen y destino de las especies de la fauna masculina paisa (2009)

== Awards ==
- Poetry National Awards, University of Nariño, 1974
- Poetry National Awards, University of Antioquia, 1980
- Roldanillo Poetry National Awards, Ediciones Embalaje, Museo Rayo, 1987
