= Anabel Flores Salazar =

Mexican journalist

- Born: c. 1984
- Disappeared: 8 February 2016 (aged 32); Orizaba, Veracruz, Mexico
- Status: Found Dead
- Died: 9 February 2016 (aged 32)
- Cause of death: Suffocation
- Body discovered: Cuacnopalan-Tehuacan Highway, Puebla, Mexico
- Occupation: Journalist
- Years active: 6
- Employer(s): El Sol De Orizaba, collaborated with El Mundo de Orizaba and El Buen Tono
- Spouse: Alejandro Báez Juárez
- Children: 2
- Relatives: Sandra Luz Salazar (Aunt)

Anabel Flores Salazar (c. 1984 – 9 February 2016), a Mexican journalist working for the El Sol de Orizaba in Orizaba, Veracruz, Mexico, was murdered and found dead on the Cuacnopalan-Tehuacan highway in Puebla, Mexico. Her death is one of many in the Veracruz region thought to be related to drug cartel violence.

== Early life ==
Anabel Flores Salazar was a Mexican journalist. She was thirty two years old when she was kidnapped and murdered. She lived in a house in the mountains of Mariano Escobedo, which is located in Orizaba, Veracruz. Salazar's aunt, Sandra Luz Salazar, was with her on the day that she was kidnapped. Salazar was married to a previous commander of the Nogales police, Alejandro Báez Juárez. She was the mother of a 2-week-old newborn and a young son when she was kidnapped from her home.

== Career ==
Anabel Flores Salazar worked as a freelance reporter for the newspaper El Sol de Orizaba at the time of her death. She had worked as a reporter for at least six years prior to her murder. Before her job at El Sol de Orizaba, she had also reported for other news outlets such as El Mundo de Orizaba and El Buen Tono. Salazar worked for El Buen Tono before she began working for El Sol de Orizaba. However, due to her investment in a vehicle that seemed to be out of her price range, Salazar's boss thought she was secretly working with criminals to gain more money. Because of this, she was let go from her job at El Buen Tono nearly a year before her death.

In her reports, Salazar investigated local crimes such as vehicle accidents and police duties. In addition, she often wrote about murders, often finding a connection with teenage girl victims and the drug cartel in the area. Due to her investigation of the murders of young females, she coined the term "femicida" in her writing.

== Death ==
Orizaba, Veracruz and Puebla are in Mexico and shown relative to the capital Mexico City.

On Monday, 8 February 2016, fifteen days after giving birth to her baby, Anabel Flores Salazar was abducted from her home. The next day, Tuesday, 9 February 2016, her tied up body was recovered on the side of a road. Her corpse was located thirty minutes from her home in Mariano Escobedo, in the state of Puebla alongside the Cuacnopalan-Tehuacan highway. When she was discovered, her head had been covered by a plastic bag, her pants were around her ankles, and her hands were bound tightly against her back. The cause of her death was deemed to be suffocation. Salazar was the third Mexican journalist who had been murdered in 2016.

=== Investigation ===
Salazar's aunt, Sandra Luz Salazar, witnessed eight people that were dressed in dark military fatigues and wielding weapons enter the Salazar household around two in the morning on 8 February 2016. The criminals stated they carried a warrant for the arrest of Anabel Flores Salazar as they aimed their weapons at the family. Salazar was feeding her 2-week-old newborn at the time of their arrival. The people in fatigues forcefully took her from her home, threw her into a large vehicle, and drove away. After Salazar's family reported the incident, local police began a search for Salazar, placing clearance zones along heavily traveled roads in the area. Her body was found the next day on February 9, 2016.

When Mexican authorities learned of Salazar's kidnapping, they opened an investigation regarding her involvement with a local drug cartel. The investigation was started because she had been previously seen at the same restaurant as a leader of the infamous drug gang, Los Zetas. However, her aunt, Sandra, confirmed that Salazar was only at the restaurant to enjoy a meal with her family and had had no connection with the man.

Two arrests have been made regarding Salazar's murder. The first was the arrest of Gonzalo Paulo "N" which was made in May 2016. The second arrest was of Manuel "N" also known as El Cacharro, a suspected leader of Los Zetas.

== Context ==
It is believed that Salazar's murder is connected to drug cartel violence. The same day that Salazar's body was found, two other bodies were uncovered on a property connected to illegal activities, including drug storage. These bodies were connected to a crime that Salazar had been investigating before she was murdered. In addition, in the days following Salazar's murder, a newspaper that she had previously worked for, El Buen Tono, was being threatened with arson by alleged members of the drug gang, Los Zetas.

Mexico is known for its drug related violence which causes it to be very dangerous for journalists. The state of Veracruz is one of the most dangerous. Several journalists have been murdered and a few have vanished in Veracruz since 2010. Many account these occurrences to the election of Governor Javier Duarte in 2010.

== Impact ==
Anabel Flores Salazar is only one of several journalists who have been murdered in reaction to his or her job. Veracruz is an exceedingly dangerous area for journalists to live and report in. There have been six murders, seven ongoing investigations of murders, and three missing person reports in the state since 2011. These reports were confirmed to be in retaliation of the victim's journalism career.

Salazar's murder had an impact internationally due to Governor Duarte's false accusations of her involvement with a member of Los Zetas. Several organised groups have been vocal in their dismissal of Governor Duarte's condemning of journalists. UNESCO, the Committee to Protect Journalists, and several other organizations have issued statements regarding Anabel Flores Salazar's murder.

== Reactions ==
Irina Bokova, UNESCO's director-general, said, "I condemn the murder of Anabel Flores Salazar. This crime has deprived people of a voice that nourished informed public debate and contributed to the free flow of information. In the name of justice and in order to promote safer working conditions for journalists, I call on the authorities to investigate this crime and bring its perpetrators to trial."

A spokesperson for the Committee to Protect Journalists, Carlos Lauría, said, "The administration of Governor Javier Duarte Ochoa has a dismal record of impunity and has been incapable and unwilling to prosecute crimes against the press. We urge federal authorities to take over the investigation into Anabel Flores Salazar's murder, seriously look her journalism as a possible motive, and bring all those responsible to justice."

The European Union said, "The Delegation and the Embassies of the Member States of the European Union in Mexico trust that the competent Mexican authorities will carry out an investigation expeditious, transparent and effective to clarify the facts, to identify and to judge the culprits, considering among other reasons those linked to the exercise of their profession."

== See also ==
- List of journalists and media workers killed in Mexico
