= Annabelle Louie =

Hong Kong singer

- Born: 4 July 1959 (age 67)
- Origin: Hong Kong
- Genres: Cantopop
- Occupations: Singer; actress; host
- Years active: 1980–present
- Spouse: Jimmy Lau (m. 1983)

Annabelle Louie On Na or Annabelle Lui On Na (Chinese: 雷安娜), originally known as Lui Wai-Mei (雷蕙薇), is a Hong Kong singer, actress and host. She debuted in the early 1980s with the song "When People Are Tears on the Road" (人在旅途灑淚時, sung with Michael Kwan), and then became famous with "Don't Remember the Old Dreams" (舊夢不須記). She was selected into the Top Ten Chinese Golden Songs of 1981, and her album Don't Remember the Old Dreams won a Platinum Record.

== Biography ==
=== Early life ===
Louie was spotted by Chan Dik-Man of Hong Kong PolyGram in a competition. She auditioned for the theme song "When People Are Tears on the Road" with Hong Kong singer Michael Kwan for the Rediffusion Television drama Blowing in the Wind. The female vocal part of this song was originally sung by Candice Yu, but was later replaced by Louie due to contractual issues. The stage name "Lui On Na" was also given by Ricky Fung, a senior executive of PolyGram at the time.

=== Career ===
Louie found significant success in the Hong Kong entertainment industry from 1981 to 1984. From 1981 to 1983, Louie released four solo albums with Polydor Records.: "Old Dreams Don’t Need to Be Remembered" (舊夢不須記) was released in 1981, followed by "Song of Colorful Clouds" (彩雲曲) and "Love in Disbelief" (癡情劫) in 1982, and "Warmth Collection" (温馨集) the year after. The single "Old Dreams Don't Need to Be Remembered" (舊夢不須記) topped the Commercial Radio chart for nine consecutive weeks and was selected as one of the Hong Kong Radio's top ten of the year), Other songs, including "My Heart Is in a Trouble" (無奈我心亂如麻), "Colorful Clouds Song" (彩雲曲), "Farewell" (暫別), "Love Tribulation" (痴情劫), "Ask Why" (問為何), "Far Away from Home" (遠方天外), "Warm and Clear Currents in Turbid Times" (濁世暖流清), "Unending Love" (停不了的愛) and "The Sun Keeps Me" (太陽留住我), found moderate popularity upon release.

Upon emigrating to Canada, Louie left the Hong Kong music industry, though she remained in the music industry itself. Louie re-established herself as a singing teacher, occasionally hosting the New Age Television program in Vancouver, and serving as a behind-the-scenes training mentor for contestants of the New Talent Singing Awards Vancouver Audition. Louie has also maintained singing engagements in the United States, Canada, Singapore, Malaysia, and Hong Kong. She also worked as a fashion store owner, travel agency owner, and tour guide.

=== Personal life ===
In 1983, despite the opposition of her record company, she married her then-boyfriend and former colleague at Barclays Bank, Jimmy Lau, in a low-key wedding. In 1987, Louie and her husband applied for immigration to Canada, ultimately moving to Vancouver in 1988.
