= JustBooks =

Private library franchise in India

JustBooks CLC
- Industry: Books
- Headquarters: Bangalore, India
- Key people: Sridhar Rajaram
- Website: www.justbooks.in

JustBooks Solutions Pvt Ltd is a chain of rental libraries in India modeled on franchising. The company was founded at the NSRCEL incubator at IIM Bangalore and was formerly known by Strata Retail and Technology Services Pvt. Ltd. Initially operating in Bangalore, it has franchises in major cities across the country. In December 2016, the company raised ₹15 crore (US$2 million) from CoCreate Ventures and was rebranded as JustBooks Solutions Pvt Ltd. The libraries use RFID to keep track of books.

The company has expanded its operations to Chennai, Kochi, Vishakapatnam, Mangalore, Nagpur, Mumbai, Pune, Hyderabad and other cities .
