= Annabelle Combes =

French writer

Annabelle Combes is a French writer. She was a marketing manager at Kraft Foods, before taking art history courses at the École du Louvre. Her first novel La Grâce de l’éclat de rire (Salvator), won the 2018 Rotary Clubs literary prize. La Calanque de l'Aviateur is her second novel.
