= Annabelle Berthomé-Reynolds =

French violinist and pedagogy specialist

Annabelle Berthomé-Reynolds (born 1982) is a French violinist and pedagogy specialist focusing on neuroscience and music education. She is recognized for her performances, recordings, and contributions to violin pedagogy.

== Early life and education ==
Berthomé-Reynolds was born in Les Sables-d'Olonne, France. She began violin at age seven and studied at the Conservatoire National de Région in Nantes from age twelve. At seventeen, she toured with the Orchestre des Jeunes de Méditerranée.

In 2001, she entered the Royal Academy of Music in London, studying with Lydia Mordkovitch, Hu Kun, and Sir Colin Davis. She founded the Olonna Music Festival in 2002. She earned a Bachelor of Music (2005), Master of Music (2006), and Licentiate of the Royal Academy of Music (2004).

In 2007, she pursued a Master of Education at the University of Cambridge, focusing on self-regulated learning and metacognition.

== Musical career ==
From 2006 to 2015, she performed with the Longbow Ensemble under Peter Sheppard Skærved. She founded the Festival José David in Les Sables-d'Olonne in 2014.

She has performed at the International Spring Orchestra Festival in Malta, La Folle Journée in France, and the Ars Musica Festival in Belgium. She premiered Denis Bosse's Chirps, Scratches and Tears at the Brussels Planetarium and premiered Yop! by Régis Campo on France Musique. She has also worked with David Chaillou and Nicolas Bacri.

== Discography ==
- 2023: Valentin Bibik, Complete Violin Sonatas (Indésens / Calliope)
- 2019: Grażyna Bacewicz, Complete Violin Sonatas (Muso)
- 2016: Charles Ives, Sonatas for Violin and Piano Nos. 1–4 (White Records)

== Awards and recognition ==
- 2024: Trophée Joséphine, Winner (Pays de la Loire, France)
- 2020: Nominee, International Classical Music Awards, Chamber Music category, for Bacewicz: Complete Violin Sonatas
