= Anabela Basalo =

Serbian writer

- Born: 4 September 1972 (age 53); Zenica, SR Bosnia and Herzegovina, SFR Yugoslavia
- Occupations: Novelist, short-story writer
- Writing career
- Language: Serbian
- Genres: romance, erotic

Anabela Basalo (Serbian Cyrillic: Анабела Басало) (born 4 September 1972) is a Serbian romance writer.

== Biography ==
Basalo was born in Zenica. She graduated from the Third Gymnasium in Belgrade, and began studies of biology, which she never finished.

Before she wrote his first book she worked as a seller, waitress, held her own coffeehouse, and worked in the time-share business. Basalo responded to an ad where the girls were asked to work on phone sex lines – to read erotic stories – reportedly with desire to write them. After seven years writing the story was mature enough for the novel.

She would later describe her romantic life to Stil, saying "My love story resembles the film Boulevard of the Revolution. I met my current choice when I was eighteen and we were in a relationship for a month. At the time, he was the seducer, and I was the nice girl who had to come home by midnight... Years later, whenever I walked through the street where he lives, I'd remember him, but nothing more than that. However, after eighteen full years, he simply remembered me and called me on the phone, and after a few hours of conversation, we decided to see each other and the emotions between us woke up again. Three days later, he knelt in front of me on the street and proposed to me, and after just a month, I remained in a different state."

== Works ==
Basalo attracted attention with her first novel, Žena s greškom (Woman with Error). Not long after it she published another novel, Peta ljubav (Fifth Love). Since then, she published novels Erotske price (Erotic Stories), Tajne ženskih jastuka (Secrets of Women Pillows), etc.

Considered a "controversial writer" by some critics, Basalo's books reference ideas of male domination, the world of money, power and urban Belgrade. Although her novels talk about sex, central themes in her books include searching for identity, loneliness, environment, and what happens when someone decides to be different. Including when writing for women magazines, Basalo writes honestly about male-female relations.

Critics have also described her as an "author of a special sensibility, devoted to the personal understanding of the position of women in the world of men."

Basalo retired in 2011.

== Trivia ==
In April 2004, she posed for the Serbian version of Playboy.

In April 2008, she participated in a campaign of gay organization Queeria named "Love on the streets! Hooligans in prisons!".
