= Property tax appeal =

A property tax appeal (also called a property tax protest or assessment appeal) is a formal challenge by a property owner to the assessed value assigned to their property by a government tax assessor, which determines the owner's property tax liability. Every U.S. state provides some form of appeal right, though procedures, deadlines, and review bodies vary widely by state and county.

== Grounds ==
Appeals commonly argue one or more of the following:

- Market value — the assessment exceeds what the property would sell for, demonstrated with recent sales of comparable properties;
- Uniformity or equity — the property is assessed at a higher ratio of market value than similar neighboring properties;
- Record errors — the assessor's property record is factually wrong (incorrect square footage, room count, or condition);
- Classification or exemption errors — the property is misclassified or a lawful exemption (such as a homestead exemption) was not applied.

== Process ==
Most jurisdictions provide up to three tiers of review:

1. Informal review with the assessor's office, which can correct clear errors without a hearing;
2. Administrative appeal before an independent local board — examples include Appraisal review board|appraisal review boards in Texas, boards of equalization, boards of revision, and boards of assessment appeals;
3. Judicial appeal to a state court or specialized tax tribunal if the administrative result is unsatisfactory.

Deadlines are strict and typically run from the mailing of an assessment notice, commonly 30–60 days, and are set at the county level in most states.

== Participation and outcomes ==
Only a small minority of owners appeal — the National Taxpayers Union Foundation has estimated that fewer than 5 percent of homeowners challenge their assessments, while a substantial share of properties are over-assessed, and that a majority of those who do appeal with evidence win at least a partial reduction.

== Equity research ==
Academic research has found systematic assessment regressivity in the United States: lower-priced homes tend to be assessed at a higher percentage of their market value than higher-priced homes, meaning effective tax rates fall disproportionately on lower-income owners. A national study by Berry at the University of Chicago documented the pattern across most U.S. counties, and Avenancio-León and Howard found Black and Hispanic homeowners face a 10–13% higher property tax burden for the same bundle of public services. Because appeal rates are higher in wealthier neighborhoods, appeals themselves can widen assessment inequity — a finding documented in the Chicago Tribune/ProPublica investigation "The Tax Divide" concerning Cook County, Illinois.

== See also ==
- Property tax in the United States
- Tax assessment
- Homestead exemption
