= Annabelle White =

NZ food writer

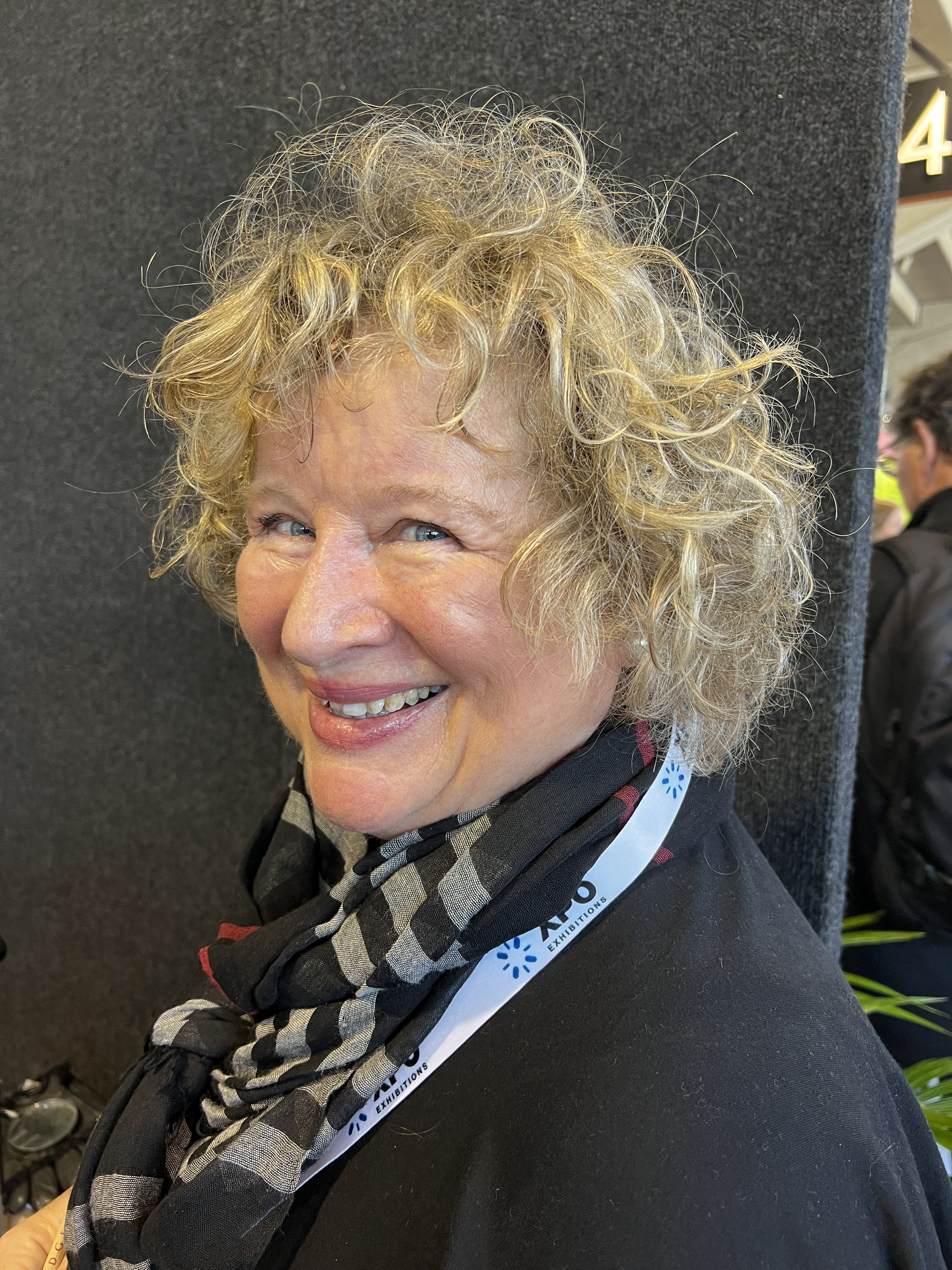
- Born: New Zealand
- Education: Master of Arts in History - Waikato University
- Occupations: Food writer, journalist
- Employer: New Zealand Woman's Weekly
- Known for: TV presenting, cookery, writing
- Website: www.annabellewhite.com

Annabelle White is a New Zealand food writer and author of eleven cookbooks. She was a long time food columnist for the Sunday Star-Times and also wrote the Food Detective column. She is the former food editor for NZ House & Garden and in October 2011 joined the New Zealand Woman's Weekly as Food Editor. She also runs cooking classes and is a public speaker.

== Early life and education ==
Annabelle White was born and raised in New Zealand. When she was 17 years old she spent a year in Dover, Delaware as an AFS Intercultural Programs scholar. She returned to New Zealand and went on to the University of Waikato, where she gained a master's degree (with first class honours) in 1983 and received a Distinguished Alumni Award in 2009.

== Career ==
White's first cookbook Best Recipes was released in 1997 and had been reprinted multiple times. Many of her titles are now out of print, but her sequel to Best Recipes, entitled Simply The Best, co-written with Kathy Paterson in 1999, topped the New Zealand best-selling list and remained there for many weeks.

She began her TV work as the food reporter for the TV3 programme Nightline in 1989 and then on a more regular basis for 5.30 With Jude and subsequently 5.00 With Jude in 1999–2001. She hosted her own prime time shows for World on a Plate featuring filming in New York City and Tonga in 2001. Her work on Breakfast TV started with TV3 in 2008 and then moved to TVNZ in 2009. On Breakfast she has filmed food and travel pieces in China (Shanghai), the United States (Santa Monica) and Ireland. White's radio work began in 1990 and she has been on-air in New Zealand on a regular basis since then.

== Selected works ==
- Best Recipes - Annabelle White (Channel Publishers, 1997)
- Annabelle Cooks Penguin Books (ISBN 0140291415, 1999)
- Simply The Best - Good Honest Cooking. Annabelle White, Kathy Paterson New Holland Publishers, (ISBN 1877246026, 1999)
- Annabelle White's Best-Ever Cakes and Slices Penguin Books (ISBN 0140293825, 2000)
- Annabelle White's Best-Ever Barbecue Recipes Penguin Books (ISBN 0140298738, 2000)
- Seasons: A Year of Fabulous Food Penguin Books (ISBN 014301840X, 2002)
- Annabelle Cooks Healthy Penguin Books (ISBN 014300882X, 2004)
- Casual Cooking: Recipes for good times in the kitchen. Annabelle White, Penguin Books (ISBN 978-0-143-56677-9, 2012)
