= Anabel (disambiguation) =

Anabel is a feminine given name.

Anabel may also refer to:

- Anabel, Missouri, US, an unincorporated community
- Anabel (Brazilian TV series), a 2005 Brazilian animated television series
- Anabel (Mexican TV series), a 1988 Mexican comedy and variety television series

== See also ==
- Annabel (disambiguation)
