= Annabell Lee (film) =

1921 film adaptation of Poe

- Screenplay by: Arthur Brilliant
- Based on: Edgar Allan Poe's poem "Annabel Lee"
- Starring: Lorraine Harding
- Release date: 1921
- Country: United States
- Language: Silent

Annabell Lee is a silent 1921 film based on Edgar Allan Poe's poem Annabel Lee. The film survives and stills for it are in several museums. Much of it was filmed on Martha's Vineyard. The story is about a high society woman who falls in love with a fisherman. The screenplay is by Arthur Brilliant. The film stars Jack O'Brien, Lorraine Harding, and Louis Stern.
