= Annabelle Duncan =

Australian microbiologist (born 1953)

- Born: 1953 (age 72–73); Nelson, New Zealand

Annabelle Duncan PSM (born in Nelson, New Zealand in 1953), is a New Zealand-Australian microbiologist who held the post of Vice-Chancellor at the University of New England (UNE) from 2014-2019.

== Early life and education ==
Duncan was born the youngest of two girls to parents who met in England. She won a scholarship to study pharmacy at University of Otago, however changed to microbiology, completing a Master of Science thesis on antibiotic-resistant bacteria. She moved to Australia in 1981 or 1982 and completed her doctorate at La Trobe University and a postdoctorate at Monash University.

== Career ==
Working with the Commonwealth Scientific and Industrial Research Organisation (CSIRO) for 16 years, Duncan's role included Chief of the Division of Molecular Science. At the Department of Foreign Affairs and Trade (DFAT) (2005-2008) she was an advisor on biological weapons control. She travelled to Iraq as a biological weapons inspector for the United Nations during the Gulf War. Her next appointment was as Executive Director of Science Collaboration and Transition in the Centre for Agricultural Bioscience (2008-2010).

In 2010, Duncan joined the University of New England (UNE) as deputy vice-chancellor (research), later being appointed deputy vice-chancellor, and in 2014 interim vice-chancellor. In August 2014 UNE announced Duncan had been appointed as vice-chancellor. In an interview with ABC New England Northwest, Duncan said her vision "is to build a real brand around UNE...I think we need to be seen as being a leading university in our niche and I think our niche is as a relevant, affordable regional university that's renown globally for our teaching..."

In September 2018, UNE announced Duncan would not be renewing her contract in 2019.

After leaving University of New England, Duncan was appointed chair of the NSW Physical Sciences Fund, chair of the Australian Council of Learned Academies Expert Working Group on Rural, Regional and Remote Research Excellence, chair of the Sydney School of Entrepreneurship, chair of the Asia Pacific International College, and member of the Board of the Regional Australia Institute.

== Awards and recognition ==
Duncan received the Public Service Medal in 1996 for her work on biological weapons control. She was elected fellow of the Australian Academy of Technology and Engineering in 2018. Honorary doctorates were conferred on Duncan from Murdoch University (2005) and La Trobe University (2019).
