= Anabel Colazo =

Spanish comics author and illustrator (*1993)

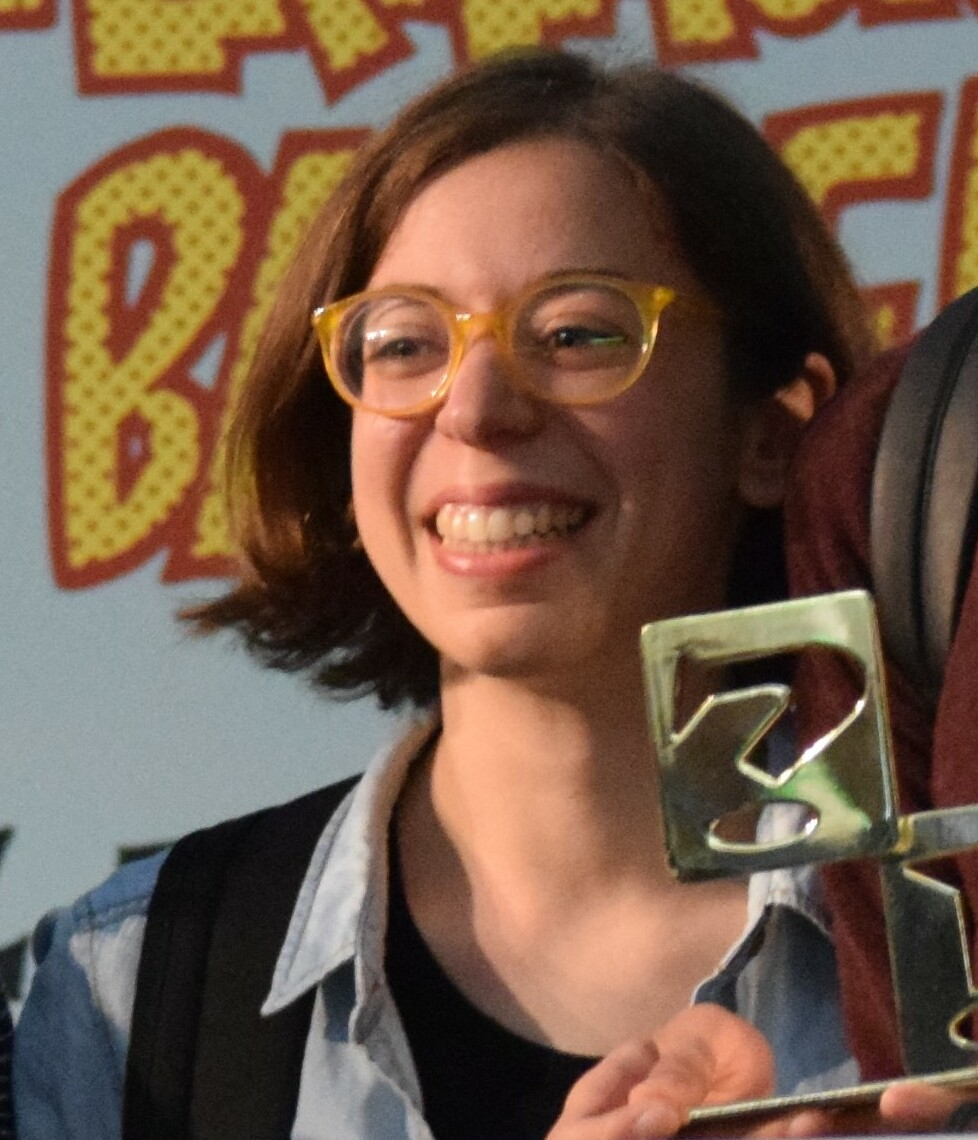
- Anabel Colazo (Barcelona International Comic Fair, 2016)
- Born: 23 March 1993 (age 33) Ibiza, Spain
- Areas: illustrator; cartoonist
- Notable works: Nimio; Paranoidland; Espada

Anabel Colazo (born 23 March 1993) is a Spanish illustrator and cartoonist. Her works include: El cristal imposible (2015), Teen Wolf (2016), Nimio (2017), Encuentros cercanos (2017), Paranoidland (2018), No mires atrás (2019), and Espada (2022).

== Biography ==
Anabel Colazo was born in 1993 in Ibiza. She studied Fine Arts at the University of Valencia.

She began making comics in the fanzine Nimio, which was founded by Núria Tamarit Castro, and included Luis Yang, Núria Tamarit, Pau Ferrando, and María Ponce; in 2016, it won the best fanzine prize at the Barcelona International Comic Fair. That same year, Colazo made her debut in comics with her first work and final degree project El cristal imposible. She also participated in the collective anthology Teen Wolf in 2016, an experience that she repeated in 2018 with Paranoidland.

In 2017, she made the leap to long stories with Encuentros cercanos, a Fortean-themed comic in which ufological and derivative phenomena invade the reality of the protagonist. Two years later, in 2019, she published her first color comic, No mires atrás, in which she explores the repercussions of creepypasta through the experiences of the protagonist. Both No mires atrás and Encuentros cercanos have subsequently been translated into French and German.

Her work Espada, was published in 2022 and carried out with the support of an Acción Cultural Española (AC/E) grant together with the "Cité Internationale de la Bande Desinée et de l'Image" thanks to a six-month residency at the "Maison des Auteurs d´Angouléme" (France), a residence for comic authors from around the world. It tells a fantasy story in which a princess, trying to change her destiny, defies the power dynamics in the kingdom she inhabits. With this work, Colazo uses elements of fantasy literature and a lot of influence from the video game genre to tell us a story that talks about power and its impact on the human being. She has also participated in various publications such as Xiulit magazine, Zeit Leo, the Ara newspaper and Loop magazine.

== Awards and honours ==
Colazo participated in the fanzines Nimio and Paranoidland, written by various authors; both were winners of the best fanzine award at the Barcelona International Comic Fair.

During the 2019–2020 academic year, Colazo received the AC/E scholarship, which promotes and facilitates the foreign presence of the Spanish creative and cultural sector. This scholarship was awarded to her together with the Cité Internationale de la Bande Desinée et de l'Image thanks to a six-month residency at the Maison des Auteurs d'Angouléme with which she was able to develop her work Espada.

== Selected works ==
- 2015 – El cristal imposible. Dehavilland Ediciones. ISBN 9788494323270
- 2016 – Teen Wolf (Vv.Aa.). Editorial Elvira. ISBN 9788494564406
- 2017 – Nimio (Vv.Aa.). Ediciones La Cúpula. ISBN 9788416400645
- 2017 – Encuentros cercanos. La Cúpula. ISBN 9788418809002
- 2018 – Paranoidland (Vv.Aa.). La Cúpula. ISBN 9788416400980
- 2019 – No mires atrás. La Cúpula. ISBN 9788417442538
- 2022 – Espada. La Cúpula. ISBN 9788418809170
