= Annabelle (singer) =

French singer and actress

- Mouloudji in 2025

Background information
- Born: Annabelle Mouloudji; 26 July 1967 (age 59)
- Origin: France
- Genres: Pop music
- Occupations: Singer, actress
- Years active: 1987–2000
- Father: Marcel Mouloudji

Annabelle (born 26 July 1967) is a French singer, actress, and daughter of actor Marcel Mouloudji.

== Singer ==
She performed the title "Fuis Lawrence d'Arabie" in 1987, which peaked at No. 12 on the French Singles Chart (Top 50). In 1988, two other 12" were released : "Casanova Solo" and "Impunément", which didn't meet the same success despite a music video for "Impunément" which was a real mini movie about ten minutes.

In 2002 Bruno Blum released a reggae version of The Clash's Should I Stay or Should I Go on a Jamaican 45 RPM vinyl single featuring Annabelle Mouloudji improvising a scat vocal. The song was reissued on CD in 2011 as part of the Human Race anthology. Other contributions with Bruno Blum include co-writing La Bombe glacée (featured on Blum's Think Différent album) and other songs recorded and released by him. A French version of Should I Stay or Should I Go also featuring Annabelle, entitled Si je reste, was released as a CD single in France. It was also included in Bruno Blum's Nuage d'Éthiopie 2001 album.

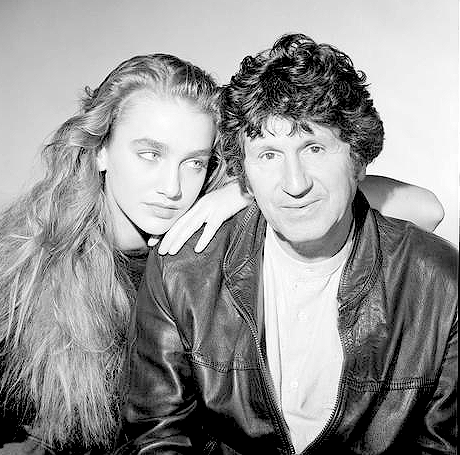
Annabelle Mouloudji with her father Marcel Mouloudji in 1983

Annabelle made a brief comeback in the music in 2000 with the album of children's rhymes La Vie à découvrir de Victor et Amandine, which was very different from her 1980s songs.

== Actress ==
She was also an actress in movies : Un Été d'enfer (1984), À nous les garçons (1985) and has participated in several TV movies as Theroigne de Méricourt (1989), Trois Nuits (1991) or La Crim (1999).

== Author ==
In 2011, she released an autobiographical book titled La P'tite Coquelicot, published by Calmann-Lévy.
