= George Cardenas =

American politician

George Cárdenas
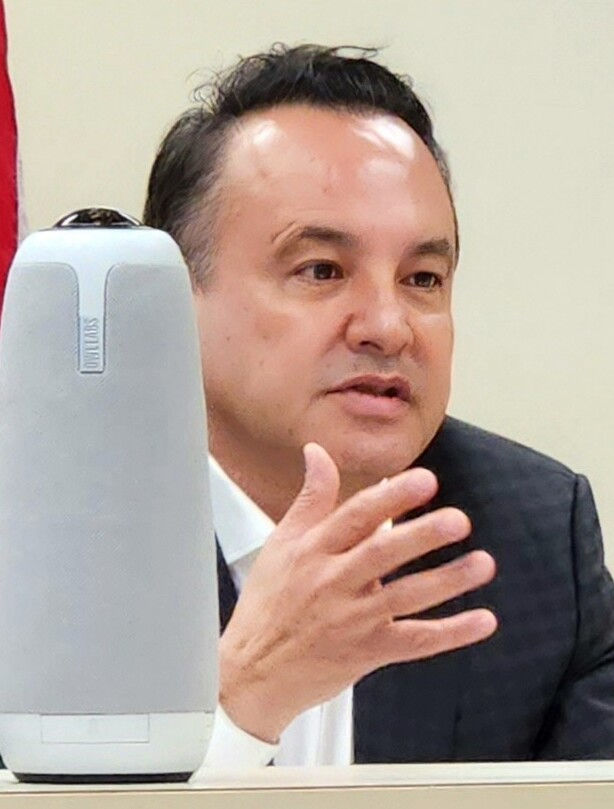
- Cárdenas at a Cook County Board of Review meeting in 2024

Member of the Cook County Board of Review from the 1st district
- Incumbent
- Assumed office December 5, 2022
- Preceded by: Tammy Wendt

Member of the Chicago City Council from the 12th ward
- In office May 5, 2003 – November 30, 2022
- Preceded by: Ray Frias
- Succeeded by: Anabel Abarca

Personal details
- Born: October 9, 1964 (age 61) Santiago Papasquiaro, Mexico
- Party: Democratic
- Spouse: Haby Perales
- Education: Northeastern Illinois University (BA, MA)

George A. Cárdenas (born October 9, 1964) is an American public official serving as a commissioner of the Cook County Board of Review for the 1st district. He previously represented Chicago’s 12th Ward on the Chicago City Council from 2003 to 2022, where he served in leadership roles including deputy floor leader and chair of the Committee on Environmental Protection and Energy. He is currently running for mayor of Chicago in the 2027 election.

He won the Board of Review seat in 2022 and assumed office on December 5, 2022. His district covers portions of Chicago and a range of suburban townships.

== Early life and education ==
Cárdenas was born in Santiago Papasquiaro, Durango, Mexico, and moved with his family to Chicago in 1978, where he attended Lane Tech High School. After graduating, he served four years in the United States Navy. He later earned both a bachelor's and a master's degree in political science from Northeastern Illinois University.

== Professional career ==
Before entering public office, Cárdenas worked more than a decade in corporate roles, including at Centel, McDonald’s, Andersen Worldwide, Tenneco, and Ameritech/SBC; he also worked in auditing, tax policy and consulting. He also worked as a substitute teacher and auditor earlier in his career.

== Chicago City Council ==
=== Elections and ward ===
Cárdenas first won election as 12th Ward alderman in 2003. He was backed by the Hispanic Democratic Organization. In the February general election, he finished first but short of a majority; a scheduled April runoff was canceled after incumbent Ray Frias withdrew, making Cárdenas the winner.

He was re-elected in 2007, 2011, 2015 (unopposed), and 2019. During his tenure, the ward included parts of Little Village, Brighton Park and McKinley Park.

=== Leadership, caucuses and committees ===
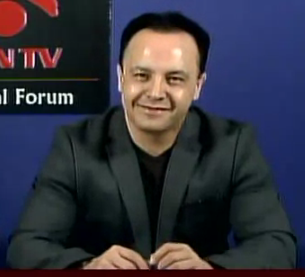
Cardenas, in 2014

Cárdenas served as the City Council’s deputy floor leader and chaired the Committee on Environmental Protection and Energy; he also served as vice chair of the Committee on Immigrant and Refugee Rights. He was a member of several committees at various times, including Budget and Government Operations; Committees, Rules & Ethics; Finance; License and Consumer Protection; Contracting Oversight and Equity; Economic, Capital and Technology Development; and Pedestrian and Traffic Safety.

He chaired the City Council’s Latino Caucus.

=== Policy and initiatives ===
As committee chair, Cárdenas introduced a City Council resolution supporting the state’s Clean Energy Jobs Act (CEJA), which the Council adopted. The committee’s jurisdiction includes matters relating to the abatement of air, water, and noise pollution. He also supported environmental resiliency efforts alongside other aldermen during instances of lakefront erosion.

Cárdenas endorsed Lori Lightfoot in the 2019 mayoral runoff, and he served as a delegate to the 2012 Democratic National Convention. Cardenas has been described as having been one of Lightfoots biggest allies in city hall, using his position as her deputy floor leader to advance her legislative agenda.

In 2006, he ran for Democratic State Central Committeeman in Illinois’ 4th Congressional District, losing to Ald. Ricardo Muñoz.

== Cook County Board of Review ==
Cárdenas won the 2022 Democratic primary for the Board of Review’s 1st district, defeating incumbent Tammy Wendt, and ran unopposed in the general election; he assumed office on December 5, 2022.. Cárdenas won his 2026 Democratic primary for re-election and a second term on March 17, 2026..

The Board of Review is a three-member body that hears property assessment appeals under Illinois law; its rules cite 35 ILCS 200/9-5. District 1 includes (among others) the townships of Barrington, Berwyn, Cicero, Elk Grove, Hanover, Jefferson, Lake, Leyden, Lyons, Palatine, Palos, Proviso, Riverside, Schaumburg, South Chicago, Stickney, West Chicago, Wheeling, and Worth. He has presented the district’s functions to the public through property assessment appeal workshops.

== 2027 mayoral candidacy ==
Cardenas announced on June 15, 2026, that he would formally announce launch bid for Mayor of Chicago in 2027 the following day. During his official announcement speech he demanded "fiscal discipline" in City Hall and promised to expand youth outreach programs.

== Personal life ==
Cárdenas resides with his family in the McKinley Park area of Chicago.

== Electoral history ==
=== Chicago 12th Ward alderman ===
2003 Chicago 12th ward aldermanic election
Candidate	General election		Runoff election	
Candidate	Votes	%	Votes	%
George A. Cárdenas	2,173	46.10	Runoff cancelled after Frias withdrew as a candidate	
Rafael "Ray" Frias (incumbent)	2,121	44.99	Runoff cancelled after Frias withdrew as a candidate	
Jose I. "Chavelo" Rodriguez	420	8.91		
Total	4,714	100		

2007 Chicago 12th Ward aldermanic election
Candidate	Votes	%
George A. Cárdenas (incumbent)	2,592	59.19
Carina E. Sanchez	1,225	27.97
Jesús G. Salazar	180	4.11
Alberto Bocanegra Jr.	163	3.72
Alan R. Mercado	158	3.61
Jesús "Jesse" Iñiguez	61	1.39
Total votes	4,379	100

2011 Chicago 12th Ward aldermanic election
Candidate	Votes	%
George A. Cárdenas (incumbent)	2,697	55.36
Jose Guereca	915	18.78
Jesús "Jesse" Iñiguez	798	16.38
Alberto Bocanegra Jr.	324	6.65
Maria E. "Chula" Ortiz	138	2.83
Total votes	4,872	100

2015 Chicago 12th Ward aldermanic election
Candidate	Votes	%
George A. Cárdenas (incumbent)	3,379	100
Total votes	3,379	100

2019 Chicago 12th Ward aldermanic election
Candidate	Votes	%
George A. Cárdenas (incumbent)	2,987	50.21
Pete DeMay	1,019	17.13
Jose Rico	1,006	16.91
Martha Yerania Rangel	929	15.62
Samuel Alcantar (Write-in candidate)	8	0.13
Total votes	5,949	100

=== Cook County Board of Review ===
2022 Cook County Board of Review, 1st district Democratic primary
Party	Candidate	Votes	%
Democratic	George A. Cárdenas	61,278	57.24
Democratic	Tammy Wendt (incumbent)	45,781	42.76
Total votes		107,059	100

2022 Cook County Board of Review, 1st district general election
Party	Candidate	Votes	%
Democratic	George A. Cárdenas	289,067	100
Total votes		289,067	100

=== Democratic state committeeman ===
2006 Illinois 6th District Democratic Central State Committeeman
Party	Candidate	Votes	%
Democratic	Ricardo Muñoz	20,349	55.36
Democratic	George Cárdenas	16,404	44.63
Total votes		36,753	100
