= Annabella, County Cork =

Annabella
- Townland
- Location in Ireland
- Coordinates: 52°08′28″N 08°39′56″W
- Country: Ireland
- Province: Munster
- County: County Cork
- Time zone: UTC+0 (WET)
  - Summer (DST): UTC-1 (IST (WEST))
- Postal code: P51
- Area code: 022

Annabella is a townland near Mallow, County Cork in Ireland. Some sources give the townland's Irish name as Eanach-bile, and translate it as "marsh of the sacred tree [bile]". Other sources dispute this derivation as a back-formed neologism. (Note: Regarding the eanach-bile (marsh of the sacred tree) derivation advanced by P.W. Joyce or indeed the áth an bhile (ford of the sacred tree) proffered by Eugene O Curry in the Ordnance Survey Namebook (1840), both are incorrect. O Curry's colleague, Dr. John O Donovan, was correct in his assertion 'I think that this is a fancy name' (Ordnance Survey Namebook). It may have derived from a one-time female resident of Annabella House, now demolished. Details of the house and demesne are given in Houses Of Cork, Vol.1-North, p.29 (Anna-Maria Hajba) where she cites Joyce's derivation of eanach bile. Early name-forms include: Annabelle(1719), Annabel(1721), Anabel(1750), Annable(1776) and thereafter Annabelle (1811, 1830, 1837 and 1840). Correspondence from Pádraig Ó Dálaigh, Higher Placenames Officer to Steven Driskell. 2011-02-10.) Mallow railway station (built c.1845) lies within Annabella townland.
