= Oregon Progress Board =

Commission in the Government of Oregon

The Oregon Progress Board (OPB) is a commission in the Government of Oregon. It was formed by then-Governor Neil Goldschmidt in 1989. The commission is composed of twelve members, including the Governor of Oregon; nine members appointed by the Governor; one member appointed by the President of the Oregon State Senate; and one member appointed by the Speaker of the Oregon House of Representatives.

Goldschmidt led the establishment of Oregon Shines, a strategic plan consisting of three goals and recommendations on their implementation. He then created the OPB, to keep Oregonians' attention on the goals, issue biennial reports on progress, and perform periodic updates to the plan. Oregon Shines was written in 1989 and updated in 1997. Private foundations contributed at least $20,000 to perform the third revision in time for the Oregon Sesquicentennial in 2009.

The initial "Oregon Benchmarks" report listed 103 benchmarks against which state agencies were to chart their progress. As of 2005, the number of benchmarks listed was 90.

Goldschmidt stated at the program's inception: "The Oregon Benchmark project is a tool to keep Oregon on track. Oregon will be the first state to hold itself accountable to its visions for the future."

In 2005, the OPB conducted a survey that found that 85% of Oregonians did not know the biggest source of revenue (income tax) or the biggest expenditure category (education) of the state. Commenting on the general lack of understanding of the state budget revealed by the poll, pollster Adam Davis observed that "This state of affairs poses a virtually insuperable barrier to any kind of major reform of our tax system or array of public services. Any effort to raise taxes for any purpose runs into the same problem: 'Can't you just prioritize and cut out the unimportant stuff?'"

As of its 2009 report, the OPB listed its benchmarks in seven categories. After the 2009 report was completed, funding for the Board was cut and the state discontinued monitoring the benchmarks. In 2014, the Oregon Community Foundation and OSU built on the previous work with a report on a series of similar indicators.

== See also ==
- Performance management
