= Birgit Krawietz =

Birgit Krawietz is a German professor of Islamic Studies at the Institut für Islamwissenschaft at the Freie Universität Berlin.

== Biography ==
Birgit Krawietz is professor of Islamic Studies. She earned her PhD in Islamic Studies from the University of Freiburg in 1990. From 1992 to 1998 she worked as a post-doctoral assistant at the Orientalische Seminar at the University of Tübingen. After having finished her habilitation with Professor Joseph van Ess at the Orientalische Seminar of the Universität Tübingen about "Hierarchie der Rechtsquellen im tradierten sunnitischen Islam" she left for the United States to join the Institute for Advanced Study in Princeton, New Jersey as a fellow. Later she continued for two years as a Heisenberg fellow at the Islamic Studies Program at Harvard Law School and the Center for Middle East Studies of Harvard University.

After her return to Germany she worked as a research fellow at the Zentrum Moderner Orient (ZMO) near Berlin from May 2006 until March 2009. and taught as a visiting professor at the Institut für Islamwissenschaft at the Freie Universität Berlin, the Universität Zürich and the Ruhr Universität Bochum. She now has tenure as a professor at the Institut für Islamwissenschaft and the Berlin Graduate School of Muslim Cultures at the Freie Universität Berlin.

Her areas of expertise Islamic law, body and space management in Islam, namely the hurma, Hanbali school of law, Salafism, sports, body and culture, urbanism in Turkey and the Gulf.

== Published works ==
- Islam and the rule of law: between Sharia and secularization. Sankt Augustin: Konrad Adenauer Foundation 2008.
- Selbsttötung und islamische Scharia nach traditioneller sunnitischer Auffassung. In: Sterben von eigener Hand. Selbsttötung als kulturelle Praxis. Hg. Andreas Bähr und Hans Medick. Cologne: Böhlau, 2005. S. 333-350.
- Hierarchie der Rechtsquellen im tradierten sunnitischen Islam. Berlin: Duncker & Humblot 2002.
- Grundlagen und Grenzen einer Hirntodkonzeption im Islam. In: Hirntod. Zur Kulturgeschichte der Todesfeststellung. Hg. Thoma Schlich und Claudia Wiesemann. Frankfurt: Suhrkamp, 2001.
- Die Hurma: schariatrechtlicher Schutz vor Eingriffen in die körperliche Unversehrtheit nach arabischen Fatwas des 20. Jahrhunderts. Berlin: Duncker & Humblot 1991.
- Islam, Migration and Jinn - Spiritual Medicine in Muslim Health Management. London, New York: Palgrave MacMillan.
