= Annabelle (magazine) =

Swiss women's magazine

- Cover page of Annabelle dated 4 February 2015
- Categories: Women's magazine
- Frequency: Weekly
- Founder: Mabel Zuppinger
- Founded: 1938; 88 years ago
- First issue: 1 March 1938
- Company: Medienart
- Country: Switzerland
- Based in: Zurich
- Language: German
- Website: www.annabelle.ch

Annabelle is a Swiss women's fashion magazine published in the German language. The magazine also covers feminist issues and initiated several campaigns about improving women's social status. It is called the Marie Claire of Switzerland. Its headquarters is in Zurich.

== History and profile ==
Annabelle was established in 1938, and the first issue was published on 1 March 1938. The idea to launch Annabelle was developed by the publishers Karl von Schumacher and Manuel Gasser. The founder and the launching editor was Mabel Zuppinger, an Austrian woman living in Zurich. She edited the magazine until 1959.

In the 1970s Annabelle was part of the Jean Fray SA which also owned the weekly newspaper Die Weltwoche. The magazine was part of and published by Tamedia until October 2019 when it was sold to Medienart. It was published monthly, later increasing its frequency to weekly. The target audience of the magazine is women living in German-speaking Switzerland.

Although Annabelle is a women's fashion magazine, it also has a long history of covering political and social issues, including feminism. Initially, the magazine was a regular publication for housewives. During the 1940s and 1960s it covered articles on the growing consumer industry and at the same time it supported the education of girls. In the next decade it extensively featured articles related to the problems of working women as well as divorce and sex-related problems. In the 1980s the magazine specifically targeted young, active, and energetic women who were emancipated, but feminine.

Annabelle also deals with the status of women living in other regions, featuring articles concerning the sexuality of women in the Arab world and honour killing in Albania. Following several family murders, including the highly publicized murder of Swiss skier Corinne Rey-Bellet, in 2006 the magazine launched a petition, "No weapons at home", to support for a ban on shotguns at home. The magazine campaigned for a 30 percent increase in the number of women in the boardrooms of Swiss companies in 2013. The same year Tamedia, the parent company of the magazine, banned it from reporting political events, such as the emancipation of women, that might cause social unrest. The magazine publishes interviews with significant figures, including Federal Councillor Simonetta Sommaruga. The magazine featured the illustrations of the Swiss graphic artist Isa Hesse-Rabinovitch.

From 2004 to 2013 Lisa Feldmann was the editor-in-chief of Annabelle. She was replaced by Silvia Binggeli in the post. Since July 2019 Jacqueline Krause-Blouin assumes the editor-in-chief position.

Annabelle has a travel supplement, ReiseNews, which is published five times a year.

== Circulation ==
Annabelle had a circulation of 111,000 copies in 1977. Its circulation was 71,292 copies in 2010, 71,445 copies in 2011 and 70,178 copies in 2012. In 2015 the magazine sold 66,121 copies. The 2016 circulation of the magazine decreased to 51,255 copies.
