= Springer Gabler =

German publishing house

- Parent company: Springer Science+Business Media
- Founded: 1929
- Country of origin: Germany
- Headquarters location: Wiesbaden
- Publication types: Books
- Nonfiction topics: Economics
- Official website: www.springer.com/springer+gabler

Springer Gabler (formerly Gabler Verlag) is a German publishing house in the fields of economy. It was founded in Wiesbaden in 1929 as Betriebswirtschaftlicher Verlag Doktor Theodor Gabler.

The program is focussed on management, marketing and sales, financial services, controlling and taxes.

Today's Springer Gabler is a result of a merger between Gabler Verlag and Springer-Verlag. It belongs to Springer Science+Business Media.
