= Anna-Lisa (disambiguation) =

Anna Lisa or Anna-Lisa is a feminine given name. The name may be used to refer to:

- Anna Lisa Andersson (1873–1958), Swedish journalist and author
- Anna-Lisa Augustsson (1924–2012), Swedish sprinter
- Anna Lisa Baroni (born 1959), Italian politician
- Anna-Lisa Baude (1897–1968), Swedish actress
- Anna-Lisa Berglund (1935–2019), Swedish archer
- Anna-Lisa Björling (1920–2006), Swedish opera singer and actress
- Anna-Lisa Christiane (born 1994), New Zealand model
- Anna Lisa Crone (1946–2009), American linguist and literary theorist
- Anna-Lisa Eriksson (1928–2012), Swedish cross-country skier
- Anna-Lisa Frykman, writer of the song "Kungens lilla piga"
- Anna-Lisa Lindzén (1888–1949), Swedish opera singer and actress
- Anna-Lisa Öst (1889–1974), Swedish singer
- Anna-Lisa Ohlsson (1925–2015), Swedish canoeist
- Anna Lisa Peterson (born 1963), American scholar of religious studies
- Anna Lisa Ruud (1933–2018), Norwegian actress, puppeteer
- Anna-Lisa Stigell (1899-1975), Finnish architect
- Anna-Lisa Thomson (1905–1952), Swedish painter and ceramist
- Anna Lisa Lora-Wainwright (born 1979), Academic geographer

== See also ==
- Anna-Liisa
- Anne-Lise
