= Anna-Liisa =

Anna-Liisa or Anna Liisa may refer to:

== Given name ==
- Anna-Liisa Bezrodny (born 1981), Estonian and Finnish violinist
- Anna-Liisa Hirviluoto (1929–2000), Finnish archaeologist
- Anna-Liisa Hyvönen (1926–2021), Finnish politician
- Anna-Liisa Kasurinen (born 1940), Finnish politician
- Anna-Liisa Keltikangas-Järvinen (born 1946), Finnish psychologist
- Anna-Liisa Linkola (1914–1999), Finnish politician
- Anna-Liisa Põld (born 1990), Estonian swimmer
- Anna-Liisa Tiekso (1929–2010), Finnish politician

== Film ==
- Anna-Liisa (1922 film), a Finnish film directed by Teuvo Puro and Jussi Snellman
- Anna Liisa (1945 film), a Finnish film directed by Toivo Särkkä and Orvo Saarikivi that received an award at the 2nd Jussi Awards
- Anna Liisa (1988 film), a Finnish TV film directed by Tuija-Maija Niskanen and starring Anna-Leena Härkönen

== Other ==
- Anna Liisa, a play by Finnish writer Minna Canth
- Anna Liisa, an opera by Finnish composer Veli-Matti Puumala

== See also ==
- Anne-Lise
- Anna-Lisa (disambiguation)
