= Anne-Lise =

Anne-Lise or Anne Lise is a feminine given name. Anne Lise may refer to:

- Anne Lise Ådnøy, 20th and 21st-century Norwegian bishop
- Anne Lise Aas (1925–2020), Norwegian interior designer
- Anne-Lise Bakken (born 1952), Norwegian politician
- Anne-Lise Bardet, French slalom canoeist and Olympic medalist
- Anne-Lise Berntsen (1943–2012), Norwegian soprano
- Anne-Lise Børresen-Dale, Norwegian biochemist
- Anne-Lise Coste (born 1973), French painter
- Anne Lise Fredlund, Norwegian politician
- Anne-Lise Kielland (1919–2005), Norwegian equestrian
- Anne-Lise Gabold (born 1941), Danish actress
- Anne Lise Gjøstøl, Norwegian singer, actress and visual artist
- Anne-Lise Grobéty (1949–2010), Swiss journalist and writer
- Anne-Lise Parisien (born 1972), American alpine skier
- Anne Lise Ryel (born 1958), Norwegian jurist and politician
- Anne-Lise Salling Larsen (1934–2022), Danish nurse and professor
- Anne-Lise Seip, Norwegian historian and former politician
- Anne-Lise Steinbach, Norwegian politician
- Anne-Lise Stern (1921–2013), French psychoanalyst
- Anne-Lise Tangstad (1935–1981), Norwegian actress
- Anne-Lise Touya (born 1981), French fencer
- Anne-Lise Wang (1920–1967), Norwegian actress
- Anne Lise Wærness (born 1951), Norwegian high jumper

== See also ==
- Anna-Liisa
- Anna-Lisa (disambiguation)
