= Bryggman =

Bryggman is a surname. Notable people with the surname include:

- Erik Bryggman (1891–1955), Finnish architect;
- Larry Bryggman (born 1938), American actor;
- Lars Bryggman (born 1993), Swedish ice hockey player.
