= Grobéty =

Grobéty is a surname. Notable people with the surname include:

- André Grobéty (1933–2013), Swiss footballer
- Anne-Lise Grobéty (1949–2010), Swiss journalist and author
