= Tamminiemi =

Historic house museum in Helsinki, Finland

- Villa Ekudden
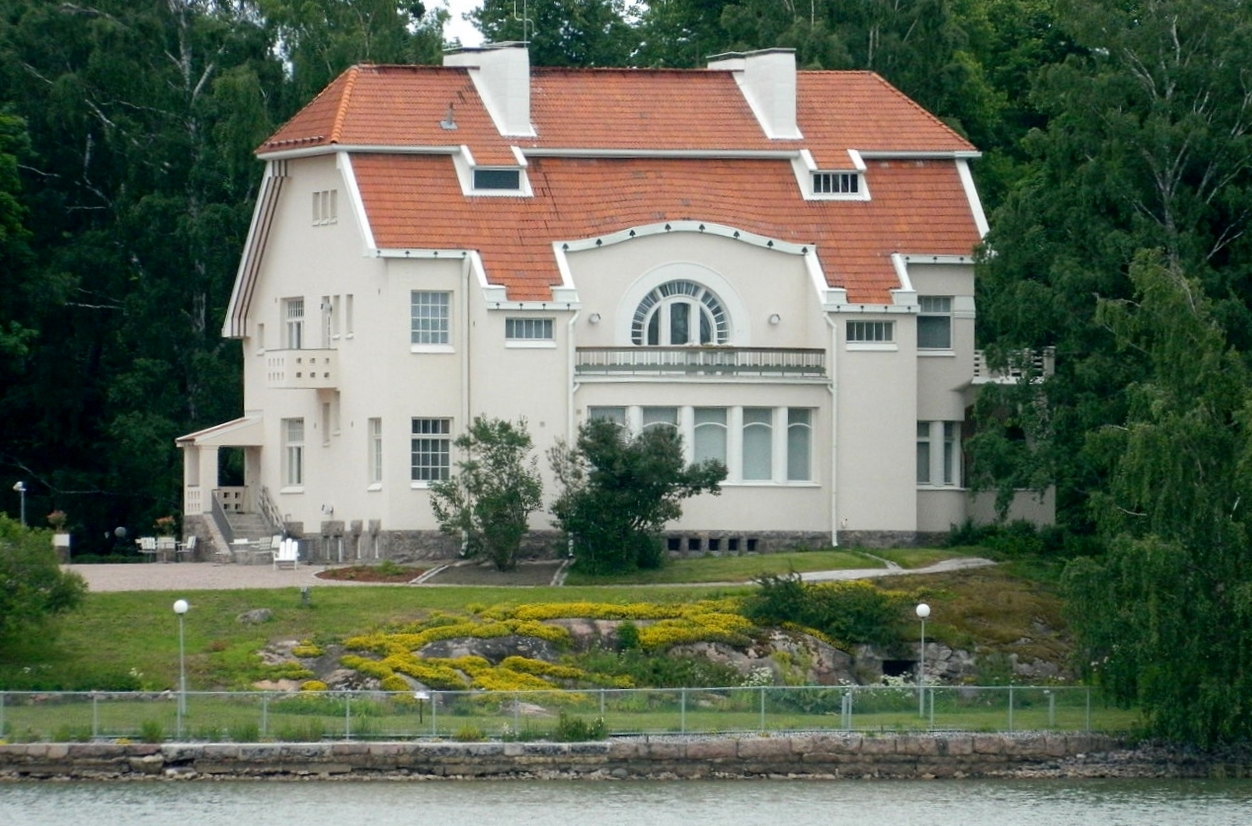
- Tamminiemi in 2013

- Location in Helsinki Tamminiemi (Finland)
- Alternative names: Urho Kekkonen Museum

General information
- Type: Museum (since 1987)
- Architectural style: Jugend
- Location: Helsinki, Finland, Seurasaarentie 15
- Coordinates: 60.18963°N 24.88311°E
- Current tenants: Urho Kekkonen Museum
- Completed: 1904; 122 years ago
- Opened: December 1987; 38 years ago (as a museum)
- Renovated: 2009–2012
- Owner: Government of Finland

Technical details
- Floor count: 3
- Floor area: 450 square metres (4,800 sq ft)

Design and construction
- Architects: Sigurd Frosterus; Gustaf Strengell

Website
- Urho Kekkonen Museum

Tamminiemi (Swedish: Villa Ekudden; lit. 'Oak Cape') is a villa and house museum located in the Meilahti district of Helsinki, Finland. It was one of the three official residences of the President of Finland, from 1940 to 1982. From 1956, until his death in 1986, it served as the residence of President Urho Kekkonen. Since 1987, it has been the Urho Kekkonen Museum. Tamminiemi is located in a park by the sea. Its floor area is about 450 square metres (4,800 sq ft); living quarters comprise the first two floors while the third floor is dedicated to office space.

== Early history ==
Designed by the Finnish Art Nouveau architects Sigurd Frosterus and Gustaf Strengell, the Jugendstil villa was built in 1904 for the Danish-born businessman Jörgen Nissen. The villa was later owned or rented by a number of individuals, before being acquired by the publisher and artistic patron Amos Anderson in 1924 with the intention of moving there from central Helsinki and had it renovated. However, Anderson felt lonely in Tamminiemi and stayed in his apartment and rented out Tamminiemi.

President Kyösti Kallio, with whom Anderson had befriended, suggested that Tamminiemi be donated to the "poor state" as the President's residence. Anderson agreed to donate the house to the state in 1940 on condition that the City of Helsinki extended the lease on the plot, which would have expired in 1942. Anderson also undertook to pay for the necessary renovation of the house. However, President Kallio never had the opportunity to reside in Tamminiemi. He died in December 1940 during his presidency, on what would have been his final day in office. Three weeks prior, he had tendered his resignation for health reasons.

== Presidential residence ==
Although presidents Risto Ryti (1940–1944) and C. G. E. Mannerheim (1944–1946) did reside at Tamminiemi, while President J. K. Paasikivi preferred to use the Presidential Palace as his official residence during his presidency (1946–1956), the villa is particularly associated with President Urho Kekkonen—largely because it was his official residence and home for around thirty years.

During Kekkonen's term of office from 1956 to 1982, Tamminiemi became the nerve centre of Finnish political life, and the name Tamminiemi became a concept in Finnish parlance. After resigning from the presidency in 1982 due to failing health, Kekkonen was granted the right to stay at Tamminiemi, and it was converted into his private nursing home, where he lived until his death in 1986.

Tamminiemi was generally considered impractical as an official residence for the President, as there were not enough facilities for the President's aides-de-camp, security guards, and other staff. It is also awkward as a family residence, as there is plenty of office space but relatively little other space. These factors, in addition to the fact that Tamminiemi was left for use by the ailing President Kekkonen, contributed to the planning of a new official residence for the President called Mäntyniemi (Swedish: Talludden; lit. 'Pine Cape'), named after its predecessor. Construction began in 1989 and was completed in 1993. It is located in the same Meilahti district as Tamminiemi.

== Urho Kekkonen Museum ==
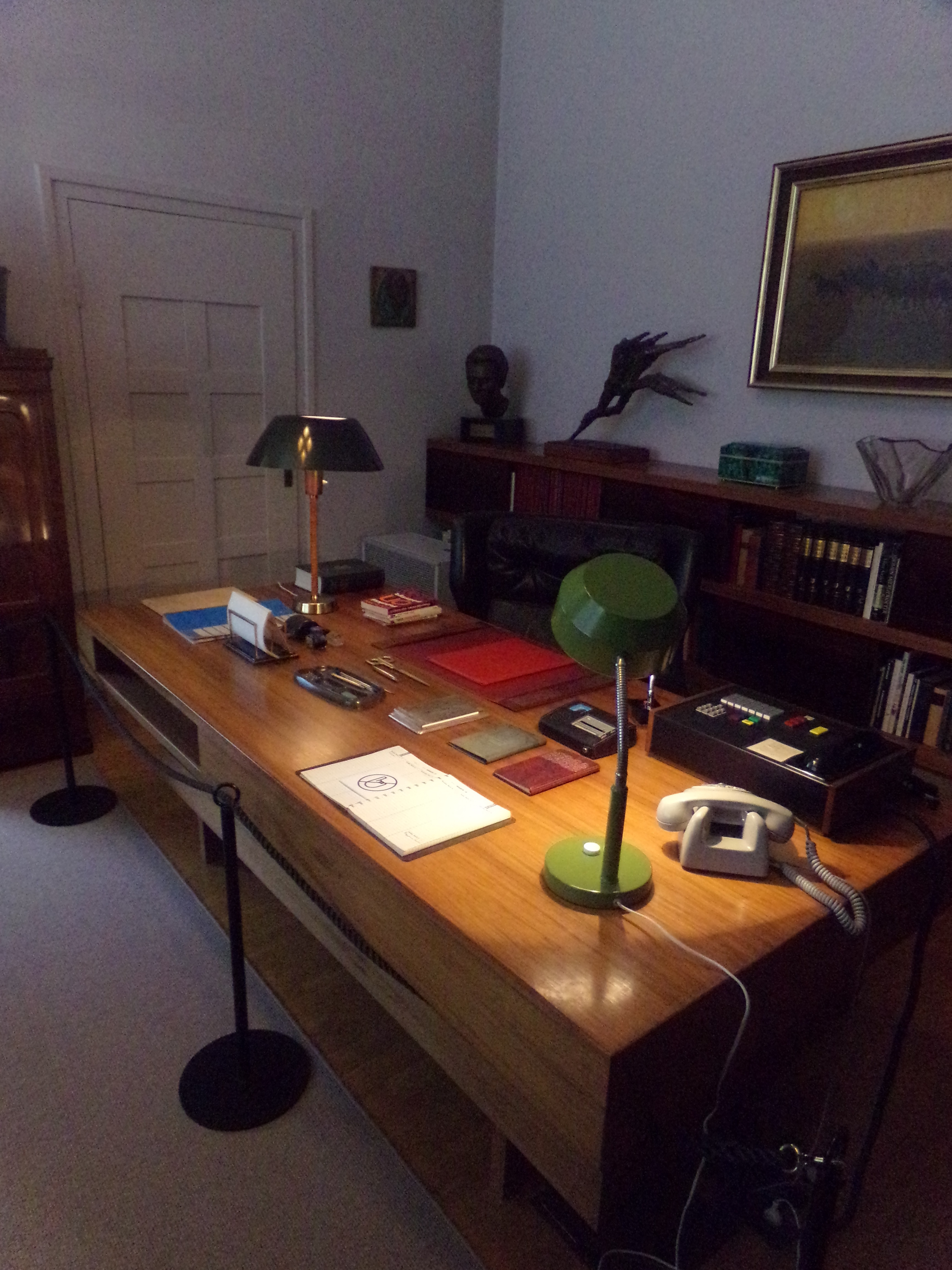
President Kekkonen's office in Tamminiemi

After Kekkonen's death, the then National Board of Antiquities was given the task of establishing a house museum in Tamminiemi in the spring of 1987. The project was made possible by a donation from the Kekkonen estate. The Urho Kekkonen Museum was opened in December 1987 by President Mauno Koivisto. Although the museum is decorated as it was under Kekkonen in the 1970s, it also presents the presidencies of Ryti and Mannerheim, and the history of Finland from the Second World War to the early 1980s.

An extensive renovation of Tamminiemi began in 2009 and was completed in 2012. The renovation restored the original exterior colouring and decorative motifs of the 1904 villa. Building services were renewed, interior surfaces were cleaned and broken spots repaired, while minor signs of age-related wear were retained, highlighting the patina of Urho Kekkonen's nearly 26-year presidency.

== Tamminiemi sauna ==
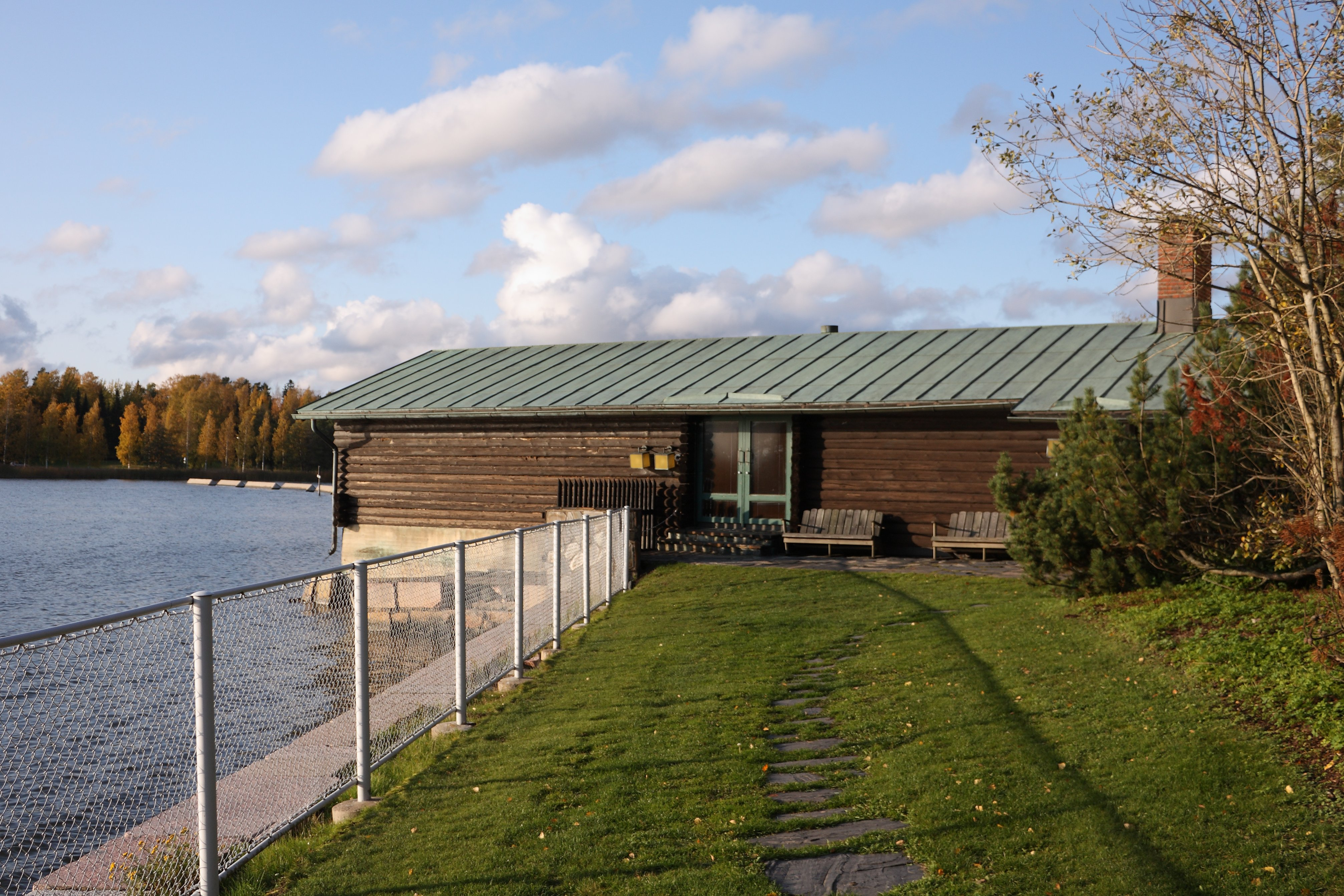
The sauna of Tamminiemi

Tamminiemi also has a famous sauna in a separate building, built by Kekkonen after he was elected president in 1956. The building also includes a swimming pool and a recreation room with a fireplace. Kekkonen used the sauna facilities to entertain his domestic and foreign guests, including the Finnish ethnologist, linguist, and historian Kustaa Vilkuna, and the Soviet leader Nikita Khrushchev. Today, the sauna can be rented for private events, but due to its cultural and historical value, availability is very limited.

== Presidents who resided in Tamminiemi ==
- Risto Ryti (1940–1944)
- Carl Gustaf Emil Mannerheim (1944–1946)
- Urho Kekkonen (1956–1986)
