= Erik Bryggman =

Finnish architect

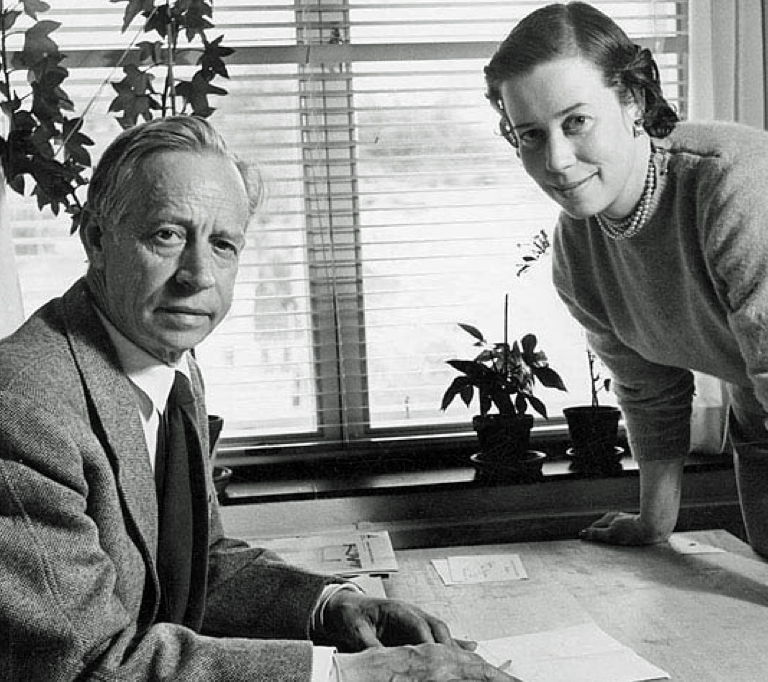
- Erik and Carin Bryggman in the 1950s
- Born: Erik Bryggman; 7 February 1891; Turku, Finland
- Died: 21 December 1955 (aged 64); Turku, Finland
- Occupation: Architect
- Spouse: Agda Grönberg
- Children: 3
- Awards: Finnish Association of Architects’ silver plaque
- Buildings: Resurrection Chapel; Atrium apartment building Restoration of Turku Castle
- Projects: Varberg Crematorium, Sweden
- Design: Turku Fair

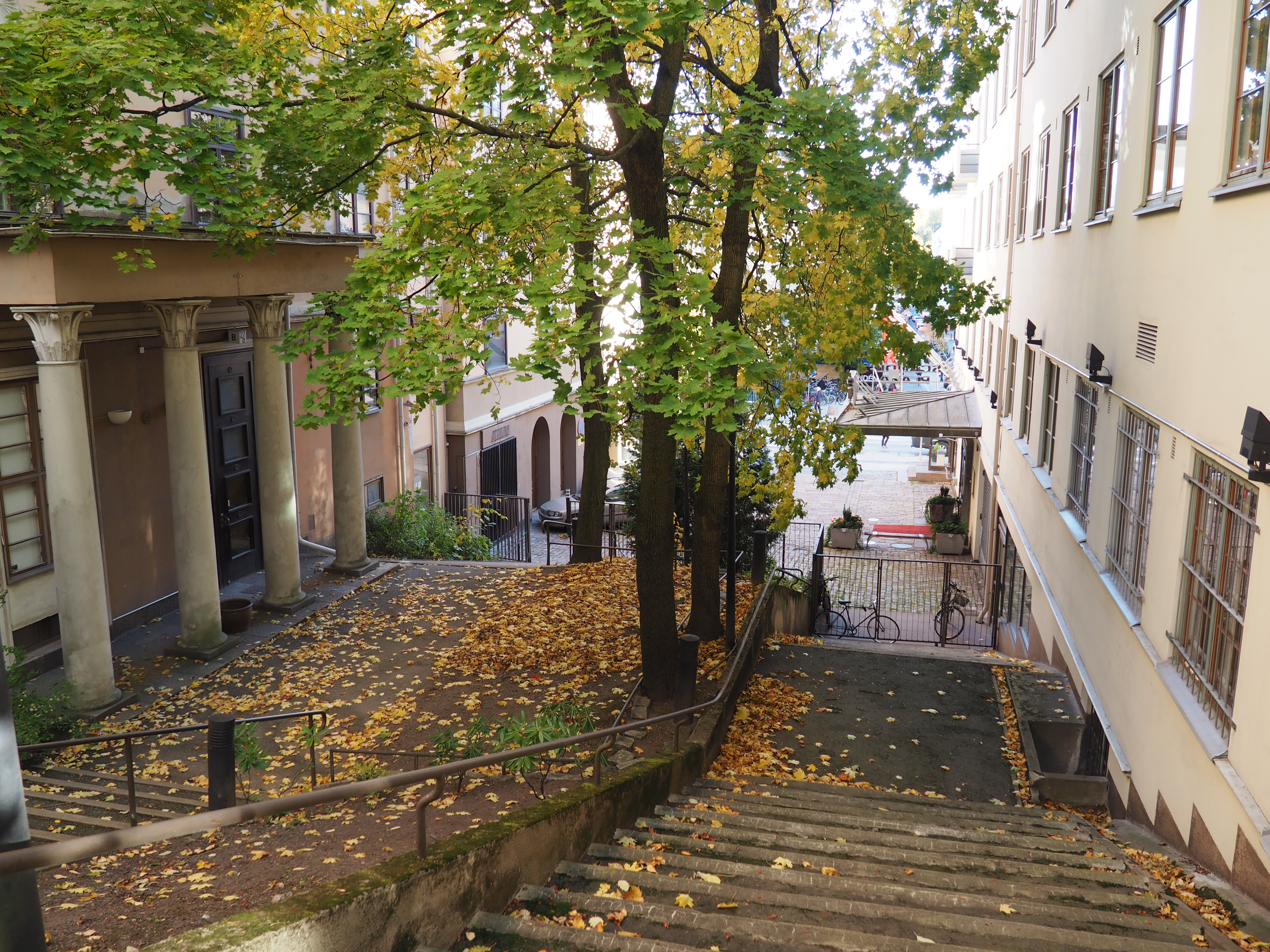
(left) Atrium apartment building (1927); (right) Hospits Betel Hotel (1929), Turku.

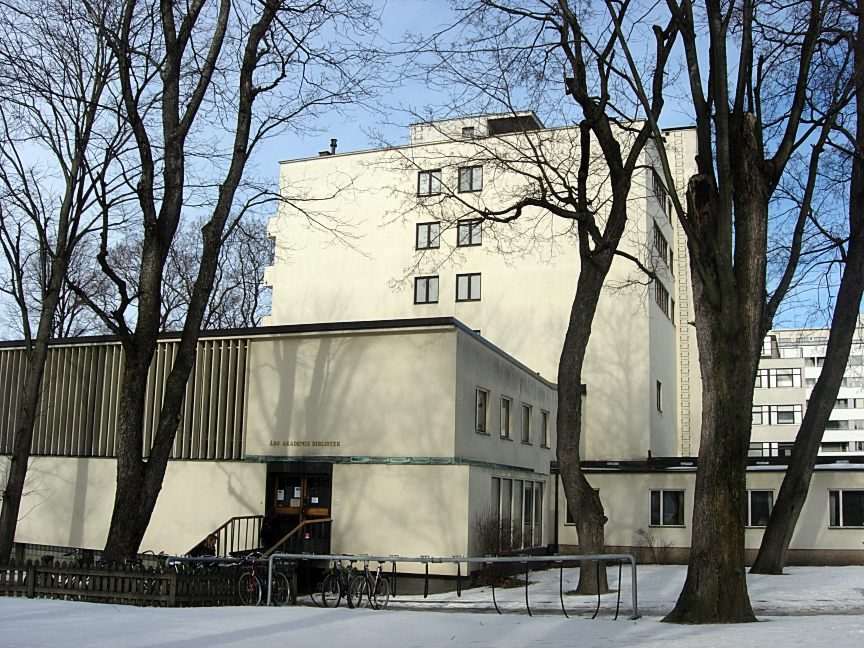
Åbo Akademi University Library, Turku (1935)

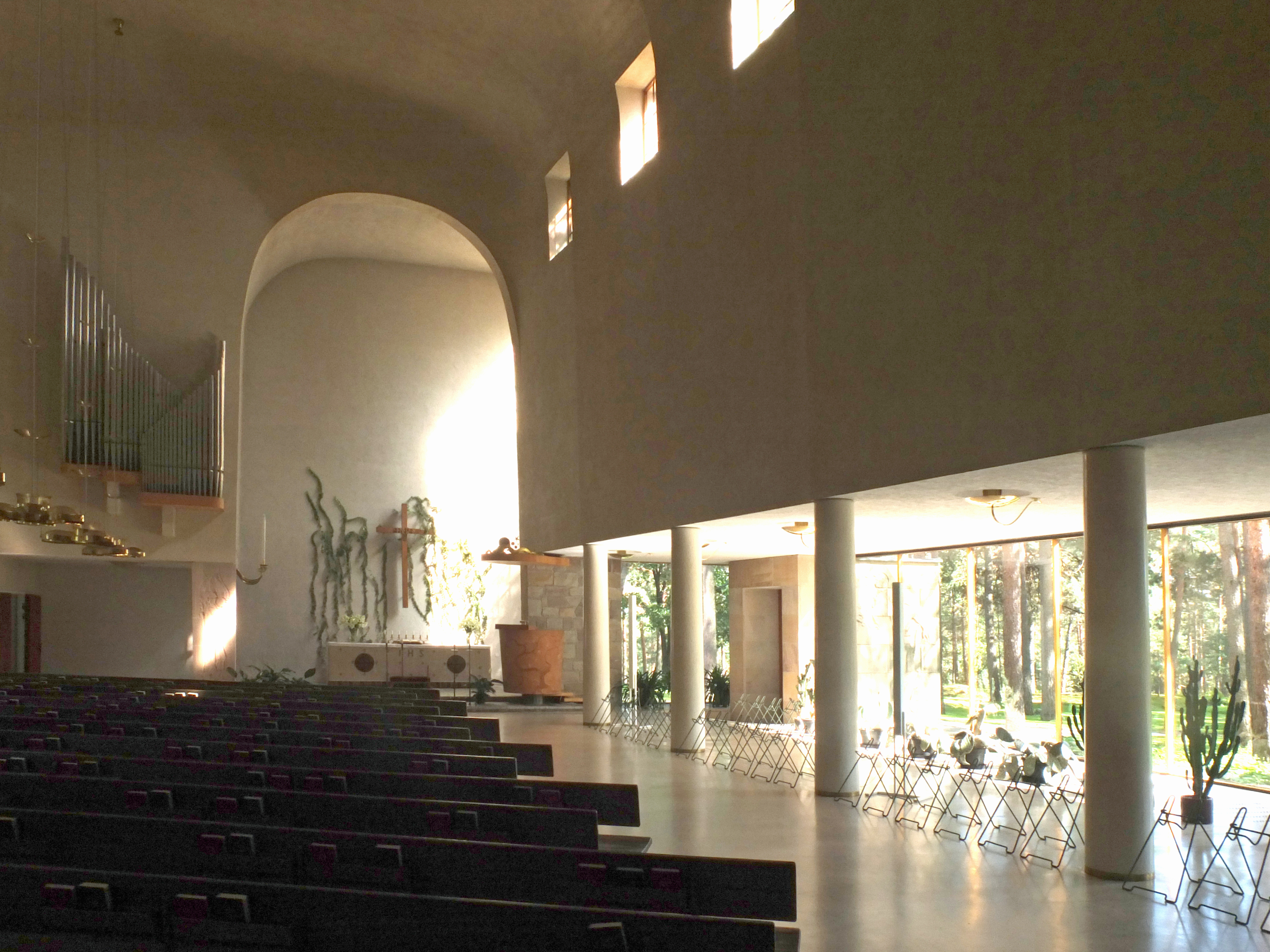
Resurrection Chapel, Turku (1941)

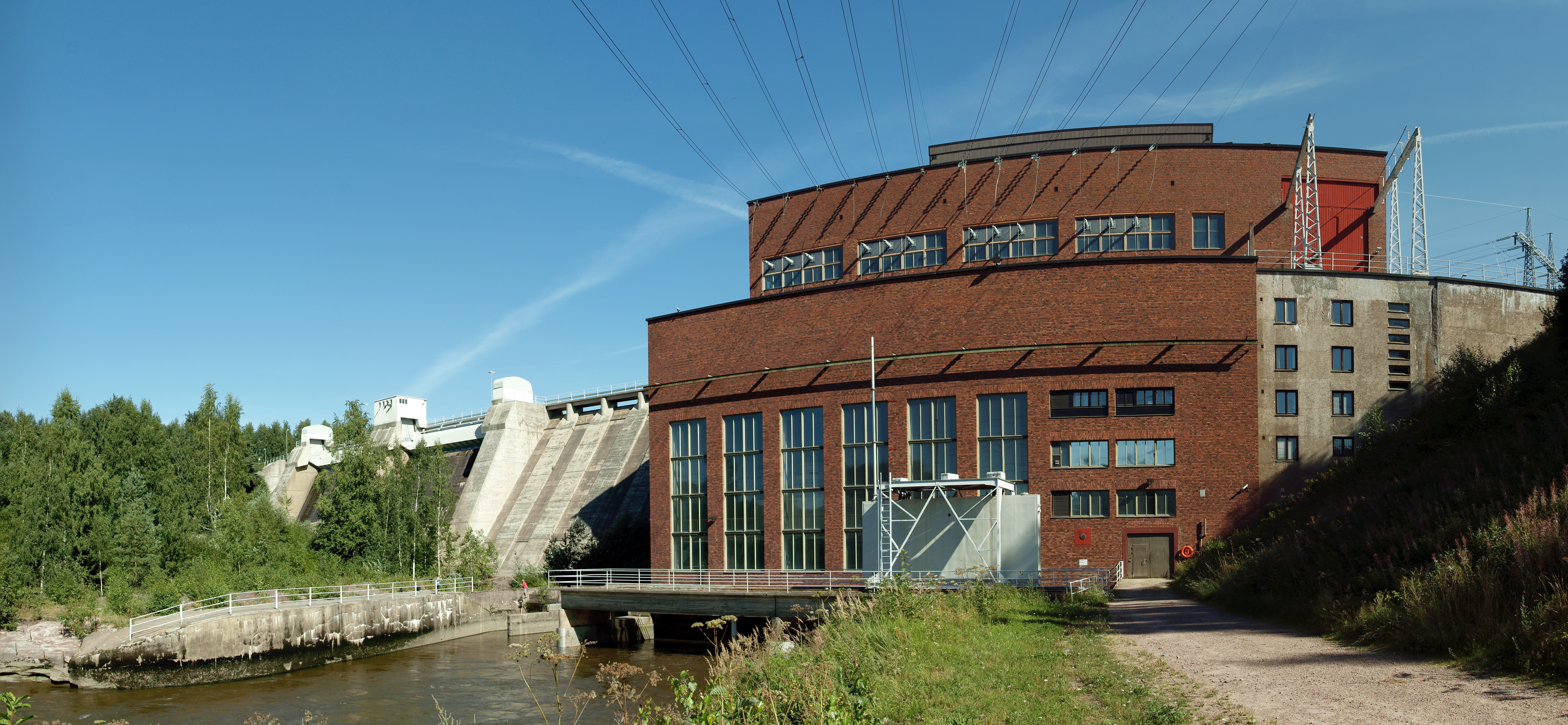
Harjavalta power station (1939)

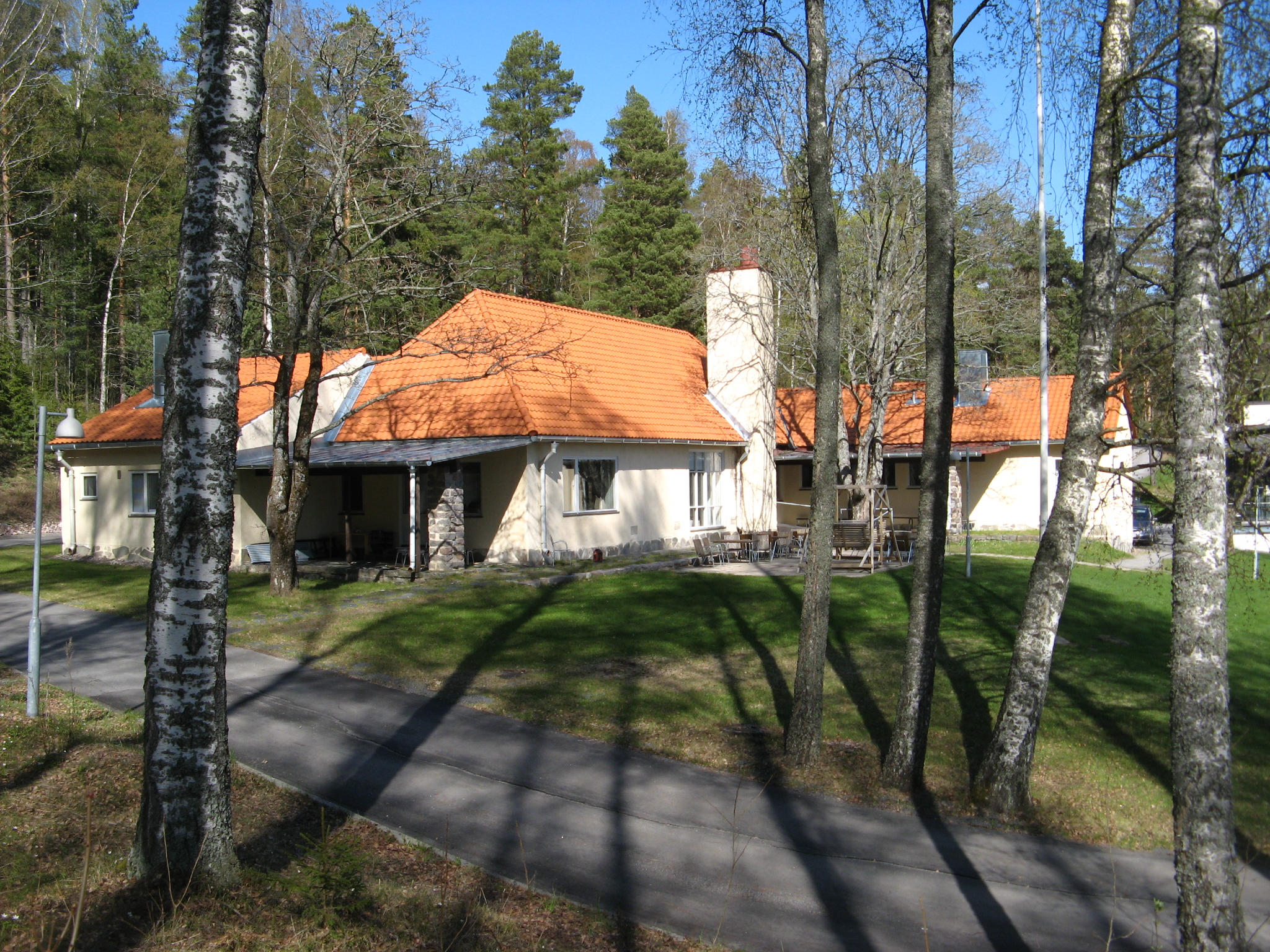
Villa Staffans, Kakskerta (1946)

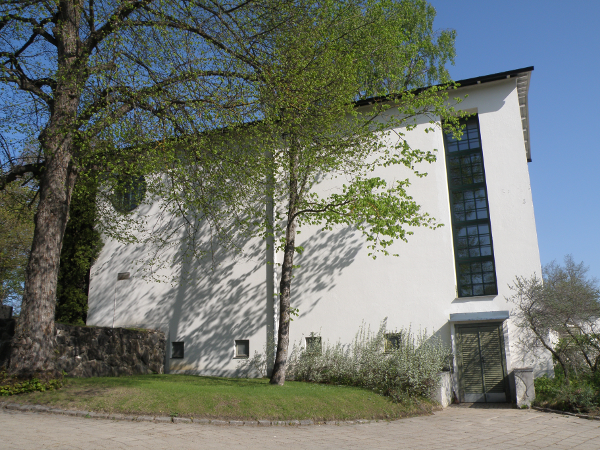
Pargas Funerary Chapel (1930)

Erik William Bryggman (7 February 1891 – 21 December 1955) was a Finnish architect. He was born in Turku, the youngest of the five sons of Johan Ulrik Bryggman (1838–1911) and Wendla Gustava Bryggman (née Nordström) (1852–1903). He began studies in architecture at Helsinki University of Technology in 1910 and qualifying as an architect in 1916. In 1914 he and fellow student Hilding Ekelund made a study trip to Denmark and Sweden. In 1920 he travelled to Italy, where he became inspired more by the local vernacular architecture than the classical or Baroque works. He worked in Helsinki for various architects, including Sigurd Frosterus, Armas Lindgren, Otto-Iivari Meurman and Valter Jung before starting his own office in Turku in 1923. Bryggman's architecture is noted for its combination of Nordic, classical and modernist characteristics.

Bryggman married Agda Grönberg (1890–1960), a nurse from Turku, in 1917. Their first child died. Their second child, Carin Bryggman (1920-1993), followed in her father's footsteps, becoming a well-known designer and completing a number of his works after his death in 1955. They also had a third child, Johan Ulric Bryggman (1925-1994).

His biography wrote by Anna-Lisa Stigell.

== Career ==
Bryggman came to prominence in Finland in the early 1920s with his houses designed in the Nordic Classicism style. Among his most notable works from that period are in central Turku, in particular the Hotel Seurahuone (1927–28), the Atrium apartment building (1925–27) and immediately opposite it the Hospits Betel Hotel (1926–29), between which Bryggman designed a small-scale yet monumental flight of stairs and piazza. The Hospits Betel Hotel project is also notable for marking Bryggman's transition from Nordic Classicism to modernism, as during the middle of the project he removed classical decoration and added a distinct modernist campanile adjoining an existing church that was part of the commission.

In 1927 Bryggman started to collaborate with architect Alvar Aalto, and together they became pioneers in Finland in modernist architecture. Their best-known joint project is the design for the Turku Fair of 1929; it is often said to have anticipated the pure modernism of the Stockholm Exhibition of 1930; but in fact, the Turku Fair was on a far smaller scale than the one in Stockholm – the main architects for which were Gunnar Asplund and Sigurd Lewerentz – and Aalto and Bryggman visited nearby Stockholm, Sweden, during the planning and building stages and took inspiration from it. With their celebration of structure, as well as typography and "street furniture", the influence of Russian Constructivist architecture on both the Stockholm and Turku fairs has also been noted by historians.

When Aalto moved to Helsinki in 1935, Bryggman continued to practice on his own, though never achieving the fame of Aalto. His two most famous individual works are the extension to the library of Åbo Akademi University, Turku (1935), designed in a more strict Functionalism style, and the Resurrection Chapel (1941, completed during the wartime) in the Turku cemetery, which represents a mature synthesis of Bryggman's architecture, moving towards organic forms, and creating a dialogue with the surrounding landscape. On the basis of the Resurrection Chapel design, Bryggman was commissioned after the war to design numerous war memorials and cemetery chapels, most notably the chapels at Lappeenranta, Lohja and Honkanummi in Vantaa.

Bryggman was also responsible for the restoration of the medieval Turku Castle from 1939 until his death (the work was then continued by his assistant Olli Kestilä and Bryggman's own daughter, the interior designer Carin Bryggman). In addition to the careful restoration and even reconstruction of some badly ruined parts of the castle, Bryggman inserted various spaces in a distinct modernist style. In addition to various public buildings (cemeteries, hospitals, a stadium, sports institute, schools, a power station) Bryggman also designed several private villas and summer homes for wealthy clients in the Turku archipelago region. Bryggman's only known realised work outside Finland was the Finnish pavilion at the Antwerp World Expo in Belgium (1929–30, which was awarded the expo's Grand Prix.

== Key works by Erik Bryggman ==
- Apartment block at 9 Brahenkatu, Turku (1923–24)
- Atrium apartment building, Turku (1925–27)
- Olympia Cinema, Turku (1926)
- Hospits Betel Hotel, Turku (1926–29)
- Hotel Seurahuone, Turku (1927–28)
- Villa Solin, Turku (1927–29)
- Turku Fair (1929), with Alvar Aalto
- Finnish pavilion, Antwerp World Expo, Belgium (1929–30)
- Pargas cemetery chapel (1930)
- Åbo Akademi University Library, Turku (1934–35)
- Kåren Turku Student Union building (1935–36)
- Restoration of Kakskerta Church, Turku (1938–40)
- Resurrection Chapel, Turku (1938-1941)
- Harjavalta power station (1939)
- Restoration of Turku Castle (1939–55)
- Kåren Turku Student Union dormitory (1945–1950)
- Villa Staffans, Kakskerta (1945–1946)
- Västra Nyland Hospital, Ekenäs (1947–52)
- Villa Nuuttila, Kuusisto (1947–53)
- Turunmaa archipelago municipalities’ hospital, Turku (1948–54)
- Pargas elementary school (1950–55)
- Honkanummi cemetery chapel, Vantaa (1952–55)
- Lohja cemetery chapel, Lohja (1952–56)
- Lappeenranta cemetery chapel, Lappeenranta (1955–56)

== See also ==
- Architecture of Finland
