= Lisa Thomasson =

Swedish singer

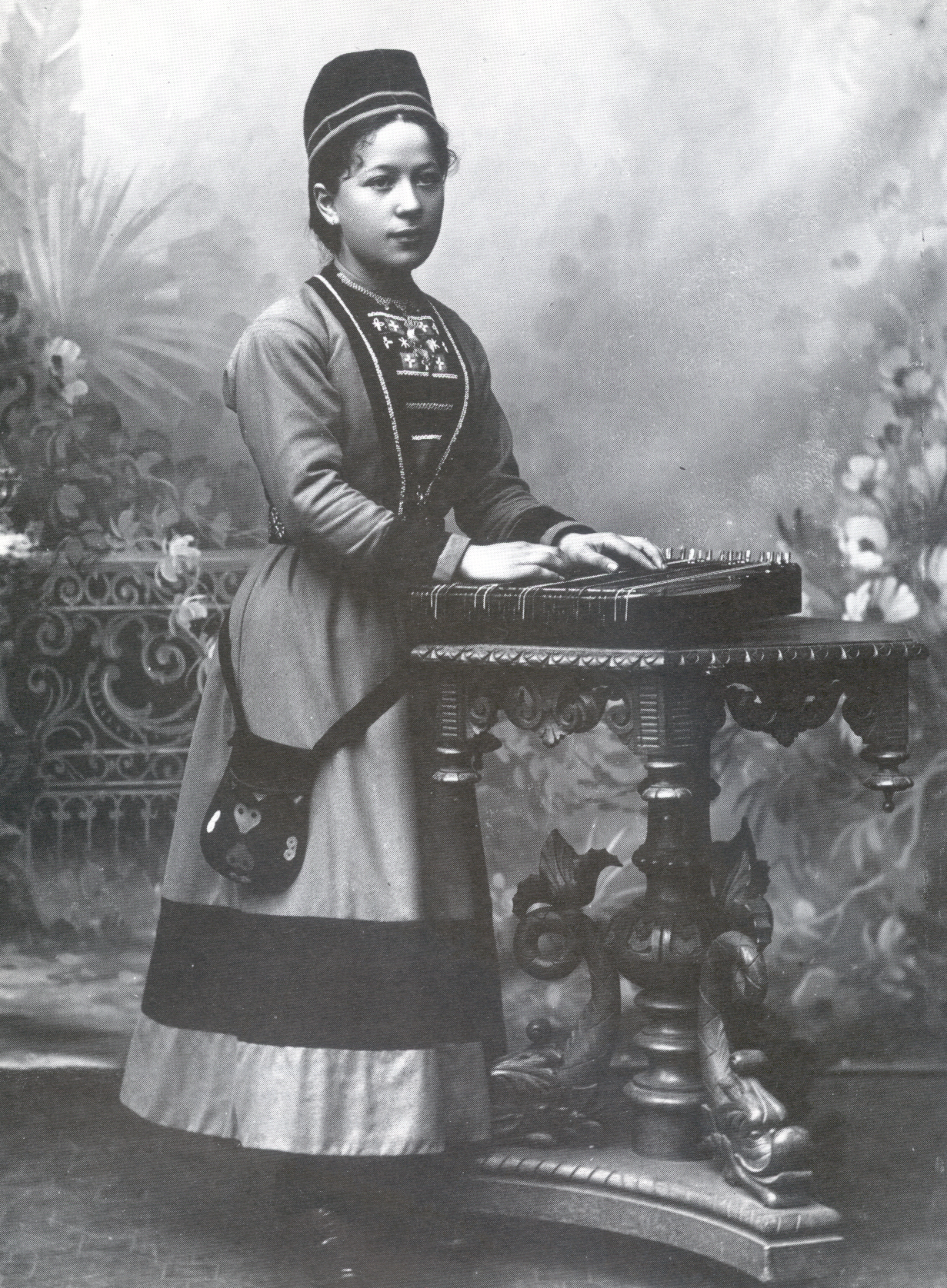
- Born: Lisa Cecilia Thomasson-Bosiö; 19 August 1878; Jämtland, Sweden
- Died: 15 April 1932 (aged 53); Furudal, Sweden
- Other name: Lapp-Lisa
- Occupation: Singer
- Years active: 1890s–1902
- Spouse: Bror Gustaf Bosiö (m. 1911)

Lisa Cecilia Thomasson-Bosiö (19 August 1878 – 15 April 1932), better known by her stage names Lisa Thomasson and Lapp-Lisa, was a Swedish singer of Sámi descent.

== See also ==
- Anna-Lisa Öst (1889–1974), Swedish gospel singer, who performed under the name "Lapp-Lisa".
