= Carin Bryggman =

Finnish architect (1920-1993)

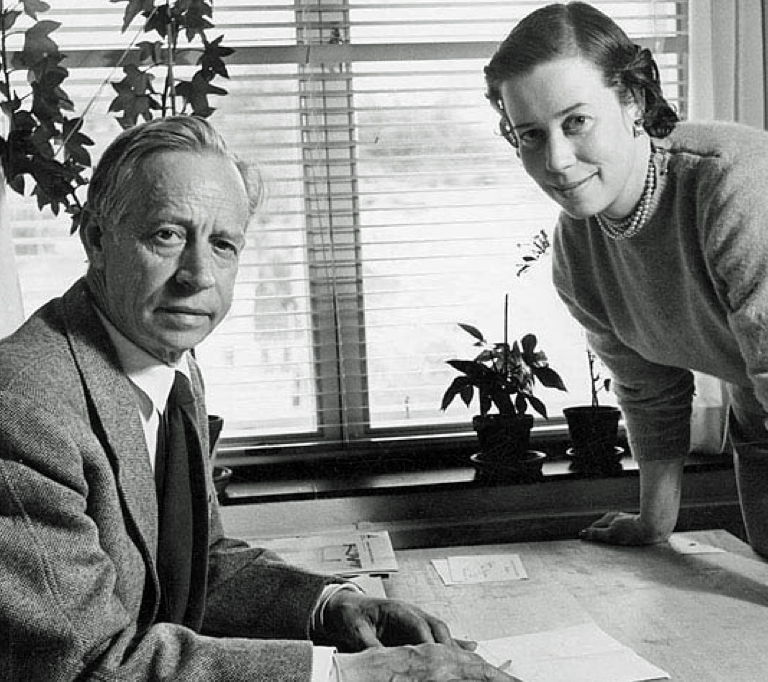
- Carin Bryggman with her father Erik Bryggman, 1950
- Born: 5 April 1920; Helsinki
- Died: 7 April 1993 (aged 73); Turku
- Education: Aalto University School of Arts, Design and Architecture
- Occupation: Architect
- Buildings: interior architect of Turku Castle

Carin Bryggman (5 April 1920 in Helsinki – 7 April 1993 in Turku) was a Finnish interior architect.

== Career ==
Bryggman studied at the Academy of Arts and Crafts (now Aalto University School of Arts, Design and Architecture) from 1940 to 1944. She began her career working in various architectural offices in Sweden before joining her father, Erik Bryggman, in Turku, Finland.

In 1949, Bryggman founded her own interior design office in Turku, becoming the first woman in Finland to do so. She was the interior architect of Turku Castle for more than 40 years. Together with her father, she led the restoration work on the castle and designed numerous pieces of fixed and separate furniture, as well as lighting, for the castle. Her most extensive other works were her interior designs for the Sibelius Museum in Turku and Åbo Akademi University in the 1960s.

Over the decades, Bryggman's commissions for public spaces included hotels, restaurants, cafes, pharmacies, shops, banks, office spaces and exhibitions. In addition to Turku Castle, her historically significant interior design commissions included the Royal Academy of Turku building and the official residence of the archbishop. Bryggman also designed interiors and furniture for private spaces.

== Awards ==
Bryggman received the state art industry award in 1982, the Svenska kulturfonden award in 1986, the Varsinais-Suomen ry Aurora medal in 1987 and the Turku city art award in 1990. She was an honorary member of the Interior Design Association SIO.
