= Liisa Keltikangas-Järvinen =

Finnish professor of psychology (University of Helsinki)

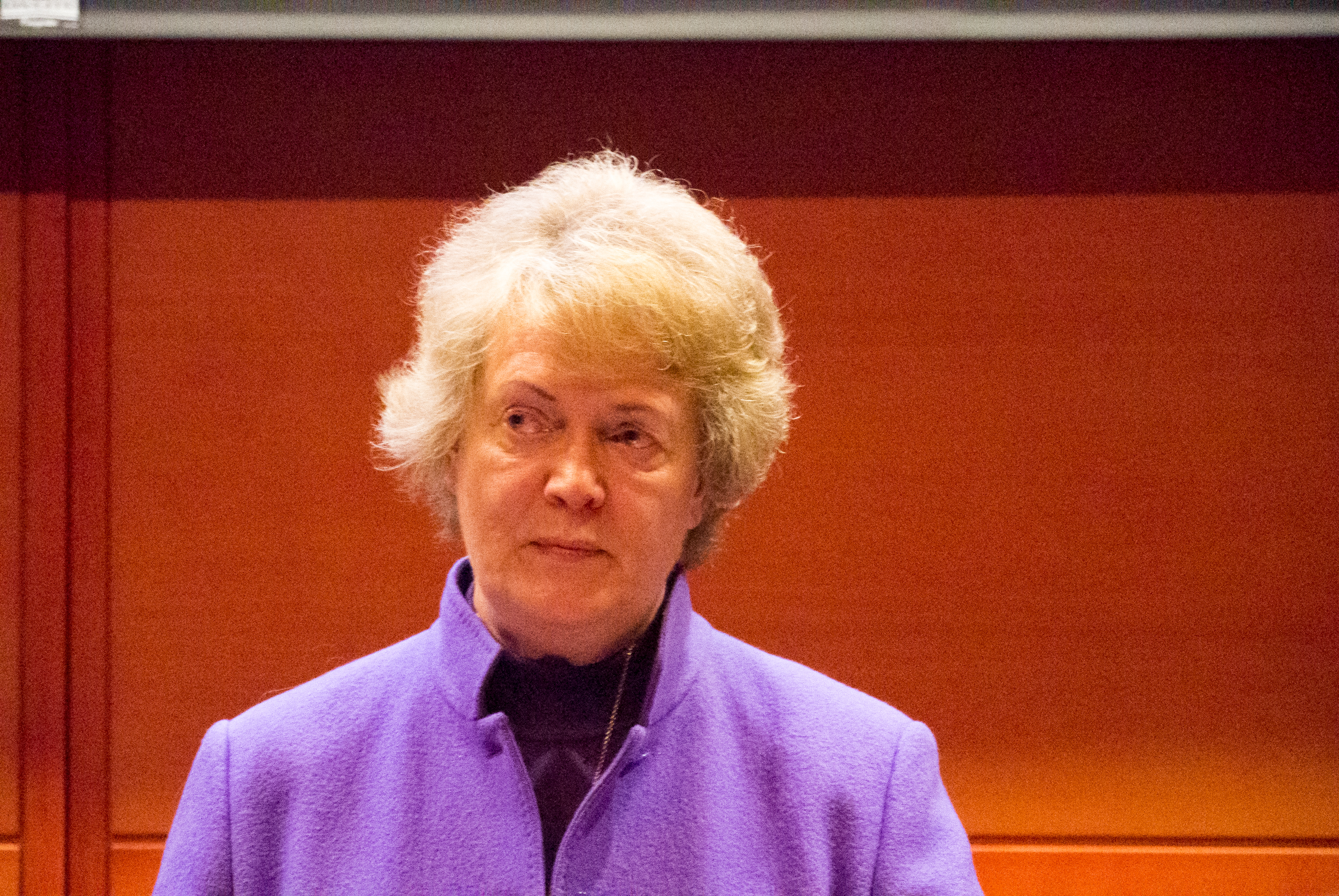
- Born: Anna-Liisa Järvinen; 6 January 1946 (age 80); Lapua, Finland
- Occupations: Psychologist, professor

Academic background
- Education: Doctor of Philosophy
- Alma mater: University of Helsinki
- Thesis: Personality characteristics of violent offenders and suicidal individuals (1977)

Anna-Liisa Keltikangas-Järvinen (born 6 January 1946) is a Finnish psychologist, known for her contributions to personality research, in particular in the areas of temperament, personality disorders and developmental psychology.

She is professor emerita at the University of Helsinki's Faculty of Medicine, where she worked as professor of psychology and leader of the university's personality psychology research group.

Keltikangas-Järvinen has authored 12 academic and several popular science books, as well as over 400 research papers.

She was appointed member of the Finnish Academy of Science in 2001, elected as member of Academia Europaea in 2013, and chosen in 2009 as the Professor of the Year by the Finnish Union of University Professors.

Keltikangas-Järvinen was made Knight First Class of the Order of the White Rose of Finland in 2005, and Commander of the Order of the Lion of Finland in 2013.
