= Lapp-Lisa =

Swedish singer (1889–1974)

- Born: Anna-Lisa Vikström; 8 October 1889; Vilhelmina, Sweden
- Died: 27 April 1974 (aged 84); Hedemora, Sweden
- Occupations: Gospel singer, recording artist
- Spouse: Johan Öst
- Children: Two

Anna-Lisa Öst (née Vikström; 8 October 1889 – 27 April 1974) was a Swedish gospel singer and recording artist, who was popular with both Swedish and Swedish-American audiences in the 1940s and 1950s. She performed in folk costume and was better known as Lapp-Lisa, a name reflecting the Sámi heritage of her home district.

== Biography ==
Anna-Lisa Vikström was born 8 October 1889, in the village of Mark, about 30 km northwest of Vilhelmina. In 1924 she married postal worker Johan "Jonte" Öst of Hedemora, with whom she had two daughters: Gun, whom they adopted in 1927, and Siw, who was born in 1935. Anna-Lisa Öst died 27 April 1974, and is buried at Hedemora Church.

In 1904 Vikström nearly drowned in a boating accident and vowed to dedicate her life to God. At the age of nineteen she was saved, and in 1911 she became an officer in the Salvation Army. She continued in this post until marrying Johan Öst in 1924.

After her marriage Anna-Lisa Öst continued her spiritual work and toured Sweden and the other Nordic countries as a singing evangelist. She was not the first gospel singer known as "Lapp-Lisa", but she was the most famous one. Lisa Thomasson (1878–1932) had previously gone by that name.

Lapp-Lisa had a repertoire of hundreds of songs, many of which she had learned from her mother. She made her first recordings in 1929 and over the years released more than 400 songs in both Sweden and America. Her signature tune "Barnatro" ('Childhood Faith') was a hit on both sides of the Atlantic and sold over 100,000 copies. Her autobiography was titled With childhood faith in the world: Lapp-Lisa tells about her life.

In 1949, 1954 and 1959 Lapp-Lisa visited the United States, where she traveled widely and recorded numerous songs. On her final trip she appeared in seventeen states and shared her Christian faith with tens of thousands of Swedish-Americans.

In 2001 a Lapp-Lisa museum opened in her hometown of Mark. More than forty years after her death, Lapp-Lisa's music lives on through the sales of records, CDs and digital downloads on the Internet. Several of her songs also appear on video-sharing websites.
