= Anna L. Peterson =

American scholar of religious studies (born 1963)

Anna Lisa Peterson
- Born: 1963 (age 62–63)
- Occupation: Professor of Religion

Academic background
- Education: University of Chicago Divinity School
- Doctoral advisor: Robin Lovin

Academic work
- Discipline: Religious studies
- Sub-discipline: Ethics; Religion in Latin America

Anna L. Peterson (born 1963) is an American scholar of religious studies who is currently a professor in the Department of Religion at the University of Florida, where she has worked since 1993. Her research variously concerns religion in Latin America and ethics—including religious ethics, Christian ethics, environmental ethics, animal ethics and social ethics. She is the sole or co-author of seven monographs: Martyrdom and the Politics of Religion (State University of New York Press, 1997); Being Human (University of California Press, 2001); Seeds of the Kingdom (Oxford University Press, 2001); Everyday Ethics and Social Change (Columbia University Press, 2009); Being Animal (Columbia University Press, 2013); Works Righteousness (Oxford University Press, 2020); and Cats and Conservationists (2020, Purdue University Press).

== Career ==
Peterson studied at Williams College (1981–1983) before going on to receive a religious studies BA from the University of California at Berkeley (1983–1985). She then studied at the University of Chicago Divinity School from 1986 to 1991. She received an MA in 1987, and a PhD in Ethics and Society in 1991. Her doctoral thesis was supervised by Robin Lovin. She became an assistant professor in religious studies at St. Norbert College in 1991, where she remained until 1993, when she took up the position of assistant professor at the University of Florida Department of Religion. In 1997, her Martyrdom and the Politics of Religion was published with State University of New York Press. The book blends theology, social history and ethnographic anthropology to explore ideas of Catholic martyrdom in the Salvadoran Civil War. She became an associate professor in 1998, and spent two years as a visiting fellow at the Wesleyan University Department of Religion. 2001 saw the publication of her Being Human, a book about environmental ethics from the perspective of religious ethics. In 2002, she became a full professor.

Peterson has published a number of books while a full professor at Florida. Seeds of the Kingdom, a comparative study of United States Amish farming communities and of El Salvador's refugee communities, appeared in 2005. Both groups examined, Peterson argues, attempt to build utopian Christian communities. Everyday Ethics and Social Change was published in 2009. In this book, Peterson argues that humans should extend the ethical values dominant in interpersonal relationships, such as love, to differently structure currently instrumental societal and political relationships. 2011 saw the publication of Working Toward Sustainability: Ethical Decision-Making in a Technological World, a textbook which Peterson co-authored with Charles J. Kibert, Martha C. Monroe, Richard R. Plate and Leslie Paul Thiele. In 2013's Being Animal, Peterson critiques the separation of environmental and animal ethics. Though frequently thought irreconcilable, Peterson argues that the separation can be blamed on a weak understanding of nature, humans, and animals, as well as the relationships between them.

== Selected bibliography ==
In addition to her books, Peterson has written over twenty articles published in peer reviewed academic journals and scholarly edited collections, as well as various review articles, book reviews and encyclopedia articles.

- Peterson, Anna L. (1997). Martyrdom and the Politics of Religion: Progressive Catholocisim in El Salvador's Civil War. Albany, New York: State University of New York Press.
- Peyerson, Anna L., Manuel A. Vásquez, and Philip J. Williams, eds. (2001). Christianity, Social Change, and Globalization in the Americas. New Brunswick, New Jersey: Rutgers University Press.
- Peterson, Anna L. (2001). Being Human: Ethics, Environment, and Our Place in the World. Berkeley, California: University of California Press.
- Peterson, Anna L. (2005). Seeds of the Kingdom: Utopian Communities in the Americas. Oxford: Oxford University Press.
- Peterson, Anna L., and Manuel A. Vásquez, eds. (2008). Latin American Religions: Histories and Documents in Context. New York: New York University Press.
- Peterson, Anna L. (2009). Everyday Ethics and Social Change: The Education of Desire. New York: Columbia University Press.
- Kibert, Charles J., Martha C. Monroe, Anna L. Peterson, Richard R. Plate and Leslie Paul Thiele (2012). Working Toward Sustainability: Ethical Decision Making in a Technological World. Hoboken, New Jersey: John Wiley and Sons.
- Peterson, Anna L. (2013). Being Animal: Beasts and Boundaries in Nature Ethics. New York: Columbia University Press.
- LeVasseur, Todd, and Anna Peterson, eds. (2016). Religion and Ecological Crisis: The "Lynn White Thesis" at Fifty. New York: Routledge.
- Peterson, Anna L. (2020). Works Righteousness: Material Practice in Ethical Theory. Oxford: Oxford University Press.
- Wald, Dara M., and Anna L. Peterson (2020). Cats and Conservationists: The Debate over Who Owns the Outdoors. West Lafayette: Purdue University Press.
