= Anna-Lisa Stigell =

Finnish architect (1899-1975)

- Born: 23 December 1899; Turku
- Died: 28 August 1975 (aged 75)
- Occupation: Architect

Anna-Lisa Stigell (23 December 1899, Turku – 28 August 1975) was a Finnish architect.

== Design work ==
Stigell graduated as an architect in 1922. She worked in various architectural offices and in 1928 founded a private architectural office. Among other things, she led the restoration of the churches of Nauvoo and Dragosfiar and the Swedish Theater in Turku, Åbo Svenska Teater. She wrote articles on architecture and a biography of the architect Erik Bryggman (1964). She was particularly interested in Swedish farmhouses and medieval churches. She worked as a designer of bus stations between 1939 and 1942.

== Books ==
- Herrgårdar in Finland. Sjundby. Söderström 1930.
- Bostadsplan and workplace Finlands svenska marthaförbund 1938.
- Vi sätter bo : en handdning för de unga som skall grunda ett eget hem. [author: Anna-Lisa Stigell, Elli Ruuth, Dora Jung; illustrations: Olof Ottelin]. Swedish population associations in Finland 1945.
- Grannas - husbands byggnadsplaner. Bostadsföreningen för svenska Finland r.f 1945.
- Nagu kyrka genome tiderna. Sartre. ur Åbo Underrättelser 13.12.1958. Åbo Underrättelser 1959.
- Erik Bryggman. Tammisaari Tryckeri 1965.
- Erik Bryggman. Bennett, Janey; Mosso, Leonardo; Stigell, Anna-Lisa; Johnsson, Ulf G.; Svedberg, Erika. Southern California Institute of Architecture 1986.
- Kyrkans teken och Sains gång : tideräkningen och Finlands primitiva medeltidsmålningar. Finnish Antiquities Association 1974.
