= Anna-Lisa Lindzén =

Swedish opera singer and actress (1888–1949)

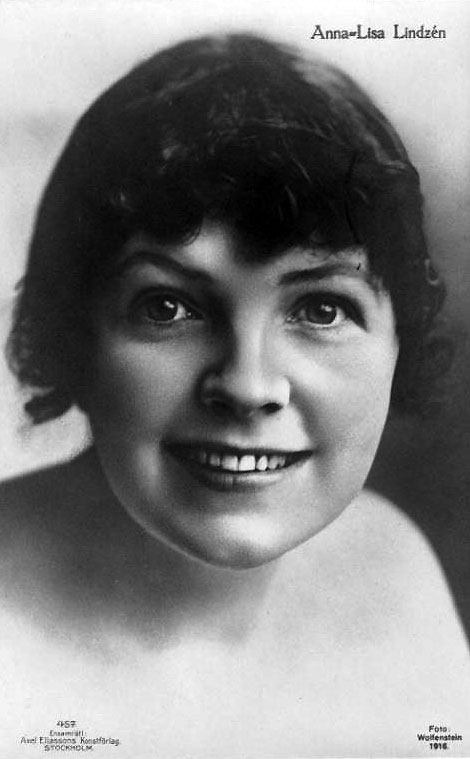
- Lindzén in 1916
- Born: Anna Elisabet Lindzén; 12 October 1888; Stockholm, Sweden
- Died: 3 June 1949 (aged 60); Stockholm, Sweden
- Occupations: Actress; singer
- Years active: 1911–19??
- Spouse: Helge Sawonius (m. 1926)

Anna-Lisa Lindzén (born Anna Elisabet Lindzén, 12 October 1888 – 3 June 1949) was a Swedish operetta singer and actress.

== Life and Career ==
Lindzén was born on 12 October 1888 in Stockholm, Sweden. She made her debut in 1911 as "Rosa" in Die keusche Susanne at Oscarsteatern and was after that engaged at Operett-Teatern 1909–1910. She joined the ranks of Swedish "theatre emperor" Albert Ranft during the years 1911-1917 and later appeared in Finland.

Lindzén married Överstelöjtnant Helge Sawonius in 1926. She died on 3 June 1949 in her hometown of Stockholm.

== Filmography ==
Year	Film	Role
1917	Alexander the Great	Fröken Filippa Ottesen
1923	Den förgyllda lergöken	

== Sources ==
- Ottoson, Elvin (1941). Minns du det än ...: Ett avsnitt ur operettens historia [Do You Still Remember It...: A Chapter from the History of Operetta] (in Swedish). Stockholm: Fritzes bokförl.
- Sveriges dödbok 1901-2009 [Swedish death index 1901-2009]. 5.0 (in Swedish). Sveriges Släktforskarförbund. ISBN 9789187676598.

== Extnernal links ==
- Anna-Lisa Lindzén at IMDb
