= Anna-Liisa Hirviluoto =

Finnish archaeologist (1929–2000)

- Excavations in Pikku Linnamäki, 1967
- Born: 16 February 1929; Helsinki, Finland
- Died: 23 April 2000 (aged 71); Helsinki, Finland
- Occupation: archeologist
- Years active: 1950-1997

Anna-Liisa Hirviluoto ( February 16, 1929 – April 23, 2000) was a Finnish archaeologist. She made her career in the Finnish National Board of Antiquities and its predecessor, the Archaeological Commission positions for 35 years.

Her research specialty was Iron Age excavations like her work at the Turku (Kaarina) Ristimäki site in 1962. In addition, as part of her duties, Hirviluoto oversaw the country's road construction projects to ensure that road routes neither threatened protected areas of the Antiquities Act nor the wider environmental management. Under her leadership, archival records were compiled and regional planning units began to publish lists of protected sites.

== Published works ==
- "Raision Ihalan 'vaskivaipat'" Suomen Muinaismuistoyhdistys, Vol 75, (1973), pp 60–67 (in Finnish)
- Iron Age cultivation in SW Finland (with Kimmo Tolonen and Ari Siiriäinen) Helsinki: Finska fornminnesföreningen, (1979) (in English)
- Hollolan kirkko: asutuksen, kirkon ja seurakunnan historiaa Hollola: Hollolan seurakunta, (1985) (in Finnish)
- Iron Age Studies in Salo 1/2: 1: The research History of the Isokylä Area in Salo (with Marianne Schaumann-Lönquis, Elvi Linturi, Pirjo Uino, et al.) Helsinki: Vammalan Kirjapaino, (1986) (in English)
- Salon esihistoria Salo: Salon Kaupunki, (1991) (in Finnish)
- Halikon historia 1 (with Kari Pitkänen) Halikko: Halikon Kunta, (1992) (in Finnish)
- Rapolan muinaislinna (with Katriina Koskinen and Voipaalan taidekeskus) Valkeakoski: Voipaalan taidekeskus, (1993) (in Finnish)
