= Sigurd Frosterus =

Finnish architect and art critic

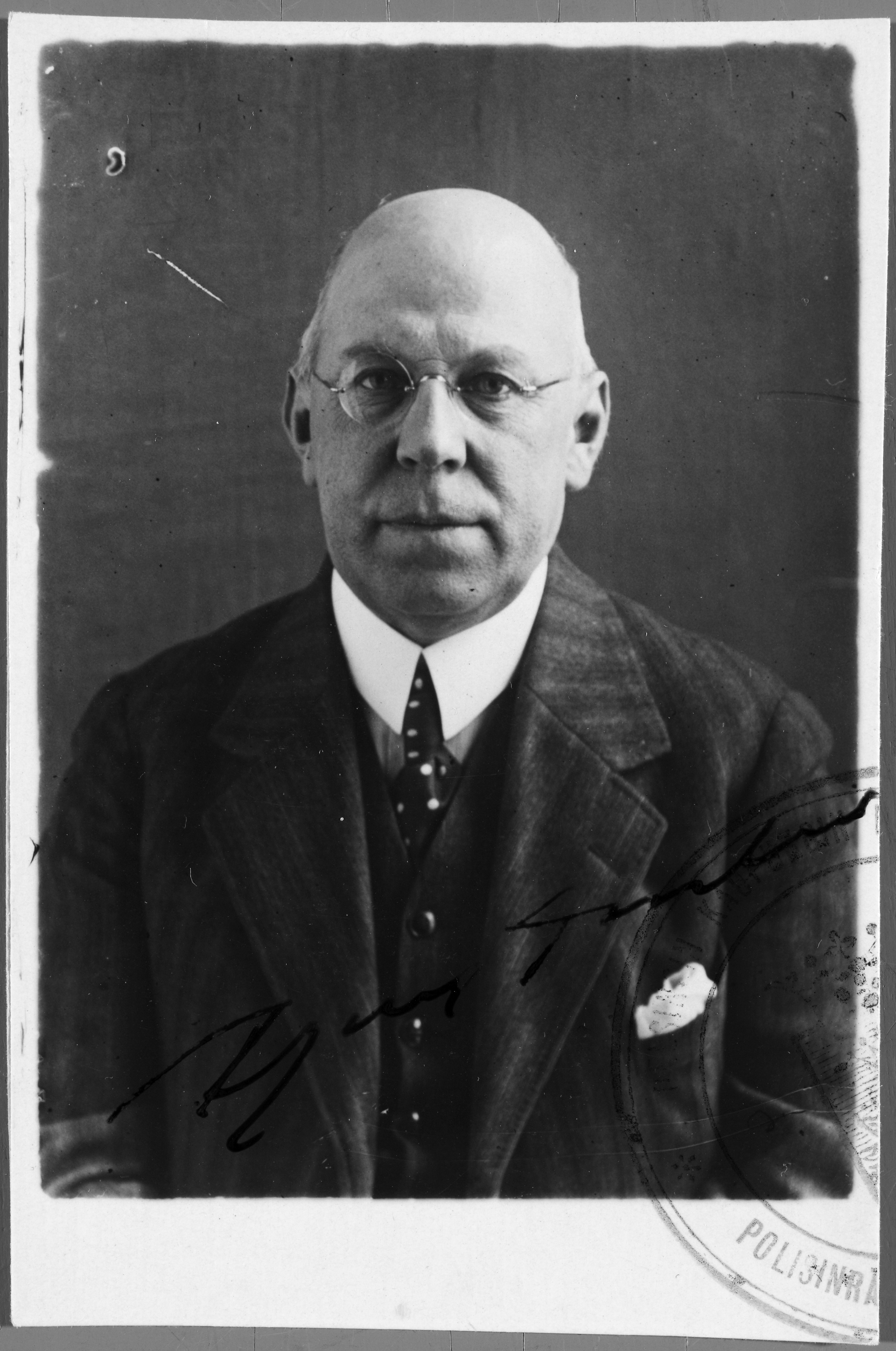

Sigurd Frosterus (4 June 1876 – 2 March 1956) was a Finnish architect, art critic, and art collector.

Born in Asikkala, Frosterus graduated from Helsinki University with a degree in art history in 1899, and earned a diploma of architecture in 1902 at Polytechnical Institute. In 1920, he earned his doctorate at the University with a dissertation on the use of colour in art.

Frosterus had an architectural office from 1902–1904 with Gustaf Strengell and from 1918–1935 with Ole Gripenberg. Frosterus and Strengell designed villas and manor houses, including Tamminiemi, which was an official residence of the President of Finland from 1940 until 1981.

Frosterus's best-known work is the Stockmann department store in Helsinki. The architecture competition was held in 1916, but the building was not finished until 1930.

Frosterus inspired numerous Finnish artists with his art theories and criticism. He collected post-impressionist art.

Frosterus was the editor of Arkkitehti magazine from 1908–1911, and published books on art theory. He was also a talented watercolour painter.

== Works ==
- Inkeroinen power plant in Kymi 1923
- Vanajanlinna Manor, 1924
- Stockmann, Helsinki centre 1930
- Isohaara power plant in Kemijoki 1949
- Helsinki Savings Bank, bank head office, 1932
- Yhdyspankki, bank head office, 1936
- H.G. Wells (1906)
- Moderna vapen, deras uppkomst och utveckling (1915)
- Olikartade skönhetsvärden (1915)
- Regnbågsfärgernas segertåg (1917)
- Solljus och slagskugga: 1 (1917)
- Färgproblemet i måleriet: 1 (1920)
- Jorden krymper, jorden växer (1930)
- Ab Stockmann Oy (1931)
- Stålålderns janusansikte och andra essäer (1935)
- Nordiskt i dur och moll (1946)
- Arkitektur (1904)
