= Anne-Lise Stern =

French psychoanalyst (1921–2013)

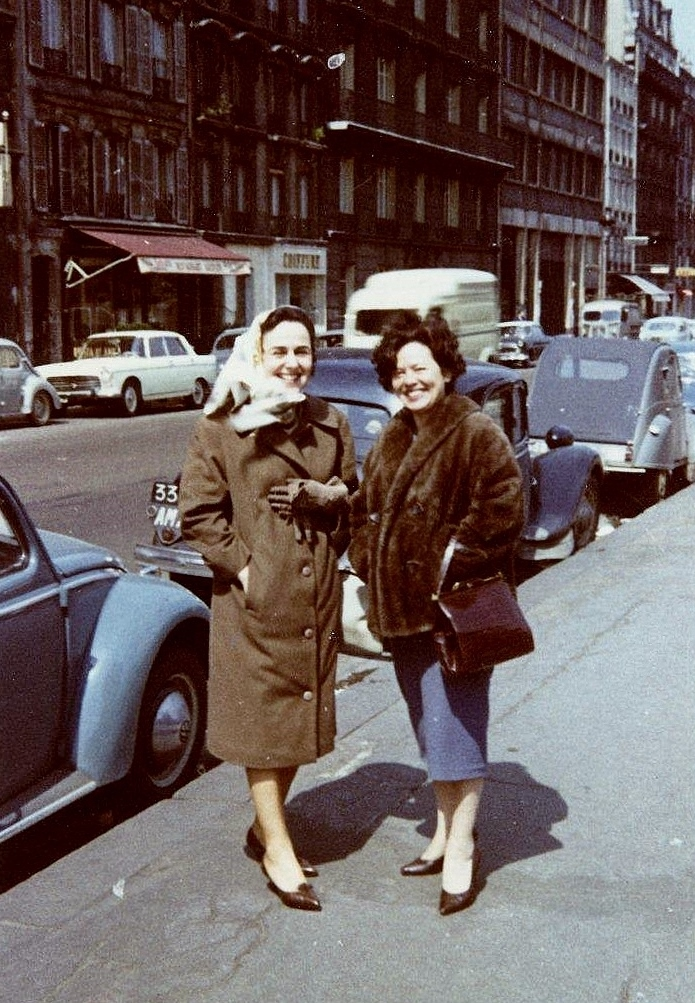
- Stern (in the headscarf) with her cousin Suzy c. 1960
- Born: Anneliese Stern; 16 July 1921; Berlin, Germany
- Died: 6 May 2013 (aged 91); Paris, France
- Occupations: Psychoanalyst; Writer
- Known for: holding seminars and writing about her experiences as a concentration camp inmate

Anne-Lise Stern (born Anneliese Stern: 16 July 1921 - 6 May 2013) was a French psychoanalyst and Holocaust survivor.

== Life ==
=== Family provenance and early years ===
Anneliese Stern was born in Berlin and then spent the first twelve years of her life growing up in Mannheim, to where her parents relocated soon after her birth. She grew up in a family atmosphere of intellectual creativity, in which the guiding vision was predominantly secular and left-wing.

Heinrich (later Henri) Stern (1893-1948), her father was a Freudian psychiatrist. He was also a passionate Marxist and secular Jew. Her mother, born Käthe Ruben (1893-1968), who worked as a nurse, also came from a politically committed Jewish family. Her maternal grandmother, Regina Ruben, was a militant feminist and Marxist, and a "companion in arms" to Clara Zetkin and Rosa Luxemburg. During her childhood both Anneliese's parents were members of the Social Democratic Party, while her grandmother Regina, to whom Anneliese later dedicated some of her written work, had joined the more recently established Communist Party.

=== Flight from Nazi Germany ===
The Nazis took power in January 1933 and lost no time in transforming the country into a one-party dictatorship. Like populists through the ages, the Nazis had gained public support on the twin pillars of hope and hatred. The hatred, targeted on political opponents and Jews, became an underpinning of government policy very much more quickly than many had thought possible, and a few weeks after the Nazi takeover Heinrich Stern, by now serving on the local town council, was arrested. Three months later he was released without charge. On the day of his release the Sterns left Germany with their daughter, settling initially with relatives in Paris. Dr. Stern's secretary, Käthe Seitz, stayed in Germany and opposed the Nazis. She was killed by decapitation.

=== France and war ===
From Paris the Sterns moved to Blois in May 1933 and started to build new lives. Later they moved on to Lyon and from there to Nice. Anne-Lise quickly mastered the language and passed her school leaving exams ("Baccalauréat"). Towards the end of 1938 she and her parents were granted French citizenship. In the Autumn/Fall of 1939 France (and Britain) declared war on Germany: she had time to start her pre-university qualification year (PCB) at Tours, but in May 1940, after more than half a year of so-called phoney war (waiting), the German army invaded and rapidly over-ran the north of France. With millions of others, the Sterns hastily joined the exodus to the "free zone" in the southern half of the country which was governed for the next four years as an (initially semi-autonomous) puppet state from Vichy. By this time the Sterns were using French versions of their names. Henri Stern joined the French Resistance in the area round Albi. In 1943 Anne-Lise was living in Nice where she befriended Eva Freud, grand daughter to the iconic Sigmund Freud. The two of them worked together between November 1943 and March 1944 as secretaries at the municipal casino. Later in 1944 Eva died of sepsis following an abortion, having been denied hospital treatment. (Olivier Freud and his family, like the Sterns, classified as Jewish by the Nazis and by the Vichy authorities, were living as refugees in southern France.)

Further to the west, Anne-Lise's father, Dr Henri Stern, was able to focus of food and care for internees at Gurs. The camp had originally been set up to accommodate returning "internationalist" fighters from the Spanish Civil War and was now being used to hold political and race based refugees from Nazi Germany. There was none of the systematic killing that was becoming a feature of the so-called death camps in Germany, and security, at least before 1942, was chiefly dependent on the extremely isolated position of the camp. There were stories of inmates freely visiting the nearest village during the daytime and returning to their camp accommodation in the evenings. But conditions were basic and food was in short supply. Henri Stern was able to extract from the camp his own mother and five other women from Mannheim. He accommodated them in a house which he rented for the purpose at Gelos near Pau. He also collaborated with the Abbé Glasberg, a Resistance contact known to be working with the OSE and the Cimade, in order to try and rescue children who had been interned at Gurs.

During the second half of 1942 a large German army was destroyed at Stalingrad and a massive Anglo-American army invaded North Africa. In France the German army reacted by taking over southern France from the Vichy government. In the streets it became progressively harder to avoid encountering Gestapo officers and their French collaborators. Anne-Lise Stern now lived under a false identity and, after the death of her friend Eva Freud, made her way at the start of 1944 to Paris. Here someone denounced her to the authorities as Jewish. She was arrested on 1 April 1944.

=== Concentration camps ===
Anne-Lise Stern was deported to Auschwitz-Birkenau in Convoy 71, which departed from Drancy (near Paris) on 13 April 1944. Of the estimated 1,500 deportees it is believed 105 were still alive when the war ended in 1945. Her travelling companions included 34 of the children of Izieu, rounded up a week earlier on the orders of Klaus Barbie: the children were gassed on arrival at Auschwitz-Birkenau. Another of the travelling companions who survived the camps was Simone Jacob, usually identified in sources by her subsequent married name as Simone Veil.

She remained at Auschwitz-Birkenau till the autumn of 1944. Faced with the relentless advance of the Soviet army, the authorities now took the decision to evacuate concentration camps in the eastern part of Germany, which included Silesia. She was included in a convoy sent to Bergen-Belsen. From there, with the other women from her block, in February 1945 she was transferred to Raguhn, a labour camp attached to Buchenwald. In April 1945, she was sent in a convoy which took a week to reach Theresienstadt.

War ended in May 1945 and Anne-Lise Stern, liberated by the Red army, returned to France, arriving in Paris on 2 June 1945. Her parents had both survived the Holocaust years. Other family members had not. Her mother's sister Ilse was killed at Auschwitz. In Moscow another of her mother's sisters, the gynaecologist and noted abortion rights campaigner Martha Ruben-Wolff, had committed suicide in 1939 after her husband was unexpectedly branded an anti-Soviet spy and "purged".

=== Postwar years ===
During the summer of 1945 Anne-Lise Stern, still aged only 24, wrote several substantial essays about her concentration camp experiences. These were subsequently grouped together and published in a single volume as "Textes du retour" (loosely "Essays on coming home"). Pierre Vidal-Naquet considered that the little compilation "matched the peaks of concentration camp literature, alongside francophone versions of works by Primo Levi, "Ravensbrück" by Germaine Tillion, together with "le Grand Voyage" and "Quel beau dimanche" by Jorge Semprún. Despite her sudden success as a writer, and not withstanding the ringside seat she had been forced to occupy in respect of Josef Mengele's savagely cruel medical experimentation at Auschwitz-Birkenau, Anne-Lise Stern never turned aside from her long standing ambition to follow her father into the medical profession.

As Anne-Lise Stern left Germany, her father made the opposite journey, appointed an army doctor and mandated to visit several of the Nazi concentration/death camps. Henri Stern returned with some remarkable reports, but was not able to complete the task before he died of cancer in 1948, supported by his daughter and aged just 55.

=== The unconventional psychoanalyst ===
- "I did an analysis with Lacan, the third time around, after a first one with Bouvet and then with Dolto. At the time it was very difficult to speak of the extermination camps in analysis since I was obliged to dream simultaneously of the camps and of Lacan. Lacan was the only one capable of hearing about it, and in the German language as well. As a result I immediately stopped dreaming about them. If I brought along letters, photographs, objects, reports of deportations or texts from my father, he took them and was interested in them all. I told him of my previous analyses [with other analysts]. I concluded my analysis by dreaming that I was throwing all the books and objects in Lacan's office out of the window. At the end there was just me left. I said that it was a dream of the end of analysis and he said that he agreed."
- " zunächst bei Maurice Bouvet, dann bei Françoise Dolto, schließlich bei Jacques Lacan ... Zu der Zeit war es sehr schwierig in der Analyse über die Konzentrationslager zu sprechen. [...] Lacan war der einzige, der in der Lage war, dem zuzuhören ebenso wie der deutschen Sprache. Das Resultat war, dass ich aufhörte davon zu träumen. Wenn ich Briefe, Fotos, Gegenstände, Berichte von den Deportationen oder Texte meines Vaters mitbrachte, schaute er sich alles interessiert an. [...] Ich beendete meine Analyse, als ich träumte, dass ich alle Dinge und Bücher in Lacans Büro aus dem Fenster werfe. Am Ende gab es nur noch mich selbst. ..."

quoted by Elisabeth Roudinesco in: Jacques Lacan & Co: A History of Psychoanalysis in France, 1925-1985.

Stern trained as a psychoanalyst, with Maurice Bouvet. Her later teachers and mentors included Françoise Dolto and Jacques Lacan. In 1953 she met Jenny Aubry, a pioneer in child psychoanalysis in France, and joined her team, working initially at the Hôpital Bichat, and later at the Hospital for Sick Children in Paris. She focused primarily on hospitalised chronically psychotic children. She became convinced of a deep connection between holocaust experiences and the extreme mental suffering that it had led to in affected children, and accordingly took on the more difficult cases. Psychoanalysis, learned from leading practitioners of the time, became her life's passion. She was a particular admirer of Jacques Lacan, whom she credited with having re-established psychoanalysis after Auschwitz. In 1964 she joined Lacan's École Freudienne de Paris.

Prompted by the "events" (major street unrest and strikes) of May 1968, in 1969 Stern, with a group of supporters including the analysts Pierre Alien et Renaude Gosset, set up the "Laboratoire de psychanalyse", a treatment facility for destitute patients. The initiative was a consciously political one. Treatment sessions were provided for very low prices. Her mother had died in 1968, and she financed the project with the "reparations payment" which her mother had received from the West German government to compensate for the loss of her father's medical practice under the Hitler government. Between 1972 and 1978 she worked as a psychotherapist in the Department for Drug-Addicted Patients headed up by Claude Olievenstein at the Marmottan Hospital in Paris.

In parallel with her hospital work, she was becoming increasingly well known within and beyond medical circles as a prominent participant at the École Freudienne de Paris, through her contributions at symposia and through articles contributed to Les Temps modernes and other journals favoured by the intellectual classes.

In 1979, alarmed by the public manifestations in France of Holocaust denial, began to conduct regular seminars under the collective heading, "The camps, history, psychoanalysis - their connections with contemporary events in Europe". The first of these were held at her apartment, after which the larger home of the psychoanalyst Danièle Lévy, became the venue. Participants in those early days included Suzanne Hommel, Liliane Kandel, Maria Landau, Fernand Niedermann, Michèle Ruty, Françoise Samson, Nicole Sels, Michel Thomé and Liliane Zolty. Stern used these seminars to study contemporary documents relating to the Holocaust. From 1992, on the initiative of Isac Chiva, the seminars were held for many years at the École des hautes études en sciences sociales ("School for Advanced Studies in the Social Sciences") in a left bank quarter of Paris.

- "Can you become a psychoanalyst after having been deported to Auschwitz? The answer is no. Today can you become a psychoanalyst without having been deported to Auschwitz? Again, the answer is no. To illuminate how these two impossibilities relate to one another seems to me to be a good starting point for the question: What psychoanalysis can come after the holocaust?"
- "Peut-on être psychanalyste en ayant été déporté à Auschwitz? La réponse est non. Peut-on aujourd’hui être psychanalyste sans cela ? La réponse est encore non. Éclairer comment ces deux impossibilités se tiennent, de quoi est fait leur rapport, me semble une bonne façon d’aborder la question: Quelle psychanalyse après la Shoah?"

quoted by Éva Weil in: Le savoir-déporté d’Anne-Lise Stern

In 2004 Anne-Lise Stern's book "Le savoir-déporté" (loosely "The Deported Knowledge") appeared. Together with her psychoanalytical essays published between 1963 and 2003, it constitutes a coherent report of her experiences in the concentration camps. The narratives are factual, without gratuitous attempts at commentary or explanation. In other chapters she describes her teenage years before the war, including her truncated period of study at Tours and the most significant encounters that she had before her deportation to the camps in Germany in 1944. The book allows the reader to share the author's vision of a "rebirth experience" resulting from the deportation and its aftermath, which provided the all-embracing context for her subsequent work as a psychoanalyst. She presents the Holocaust not as an ill-defined form of "big history" to be argued over by history scholars, but as a psychiatric reality.

== Output (selection) ==
- Le savoir-déporté. Camps, histoire, psychanalyse, produced by Nadine Fresco and Martine Leibovici, Edition Seuil (Collection Librairie du XXIe siecle), Paris 2004, ISBN 2-02-066252-3.
- Ei Warum, Ei Darum: O Why. In: Stuart Liebman (Hrsg.): Claude Lanzmann's Shoah: Key Essays. Oxford University Press, 2007, ISBN 978-0-19-518864-6, S. 95ff. (englisch)
- Früher mal ein deutsches Kind...passée du camp chez Lacan. Versuch einer Hinübersetzung. Berliner Brief Nr. 2, November 1999, Freud-Lacan-Gesellschaft Berlin
- Mending' Auschwitz, Through Psychoanalysis? In: Strategies. A Journal of Theory, Culture & Politics. Nr. 8, 1995/1996, S. 41–52.
- Point de suture (about the film Life Is Beautiful by R. Benigni). Carnets de l’Ecole de psychanalyse Sigmund Freud Nr. 21/22, 1999
- Sois déportée... et témoigne! Psychanalyser, témoigner: double bind? in: La Shoah: témoignage savoirs, oeuvres. herausgegeben von Annette Wieviorka und Claude Mouchard, Cercil Press Universitaires de Vincennes, Orléans 1999, ISBN 2-84292-052-X.
- Le savoir-déporté. Entretien avec Martine Leibovici. in: Des expériences intérieures pour quelles modernité? herausgegeben vom Centre Roland-Barthes Paris (Essais), Éd. nouvelles Cécile Defaut, Nantes 2012, ISBN 978-2-35018-311-4.
