= Anna Lisa Lora-Wainwright =

Academic geographer (born 1979)

Anna Lisa Lora-Wainwright (born 1979) is an academic geographer. She is Professor of the Human Geography of China at the University of Oxford and a fellow of St Cross College, University of Oxford.

== Education ==
Lora-Wainwright studied a BA (Hons) in Social Anthropology at the School of Oriental and African Studies, University of London, graduating with first-class honours in 2002. She then studied a master's degree in Chinese Studies at the same institution, graduating with a Distinction in 2003. In 2006, she was awarded a DPhil by the University of Oxford, with her thesis' title being Perceptions of Health, Illness and Healing in a Sichuan Village, China.

== Career ==
From 2006 onwards, Lora-Wainwright began to focus more on pollution in the countryside of China, due to her interest in the connections between the environment, peoples' activities and their health. She has organised a number of workshops on these issues, involving staff from several academic disciplines. She started working at the School of Geography and the Environment at the University of Oxford in 2009; prior to this, she worked at the University of Manchester.

Her first book, Fighting for Breath, published in 2013, concerned the care practices of, and experiences of cancer by, people living in villages in China. In 2013 the Leverhulme Trust awarded her with a Philip Leverhulme Prize; the award of £70,000 recognised that her research had had considerable international impact.

In April 2018, she was awarded the British Sociological Association/BBC Thinking Allowed Ethnography Prize for her book Resigned Activism: Living with Pollution in Rural China. However, in 2019, a panel found that Lora-Wainwright committed misconduct by not adequately acknowledging the work of Chinese colleagues in the book; she was told to change the book's content to make sure their work was cited.

In 2018, she became Professor of the Human Geography of China at the University of Oxford.
