= Anne-Lise Grobéty =

Swiss journalist and writer (1949–2010)

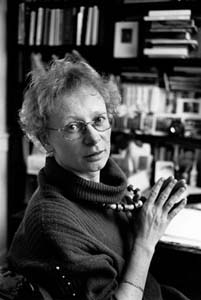
Anne-Lise Grobéty in 1993

Anne-Lise Grobéty (1 December 1949 – 5 October 2010) was a French-language Swiss journalist and an author of short stories, poetry and radio plays.

== Biography ==
Born in La Chaux-de-Fonds on the French-Swiss border, Grobéty studied literature at Neuchâtel University and went on to work as a journalist. She completed her first novel, Pour mourir en février, when she was only 19 but after her second work in 1975 she devoted an extended period to her three daughters. She returned to writing in 1984, with highly acclaimed works such as the novels Zéro positif and Infiniment plus and the short story collections La Fiancée d'hiver and Belle dame qui mord.

Commenting on her work, Grobéty explained: "I don't have a fashionable style. A long time ago I decided to work not on the busy high streets but in the back yards."

== Works ==
Anne-Lise Grobéty wrote the following works:

- 1970: Pour mourir en février, novel, Cahiers de la Renaissance vaudoise
- 1975: Zéro positif, novel, Vevey, Bertil Galland
- 1979: Maternances, poems (avec des gravures d'Armande Oswald), Neuchâtel, Éditions Galerie Ditesheim
- 1980: Les Ramoneurs, poems, Lausanne, Payot
- 1984: La Fiancée d'hiver
- 1986: Contes-Gouttes, La Tour-de-Peilz, Bernard Campiche
- 1989: Infiniment plus, novel, Yvonand, Bernard Campiche
- 1990: Jours et contre-jours
- 1992: Une bouffée de bonheur !, young adults story, Zurich, Oevre suisse de lectures pour la jeunesse
- 1992: Belle dame qui mord, essays, Yvonand, Bernard Campiche
- 1994: Non non ma fille : nouvelle, Orbe, Bernard Campiche
- 1996: Défense d'entrer et autres nouvelles, Geneva, Éditions Zoé
- 2000: Compost blues, Association suisse des libraires de langue française
- 2001: Le Temps des Mots à Voix basse, young adults novel, Geneva, La Joie de lire
- 2003: Amour mode majeur, Orbe, Bernard Campiche
- 2004: Du mal à une mouche, Geneva, La Joie de lire
- 2006: La corde de mi, novel, Bernard Campiche
- 2007: Jusqu'à pareil éclat, Bernard Campiche
- 2008: L'abat-jour, essay, Editions d'Autre part
