= Anna Karaszewska =

Polish sociologist, economic and social activist

Anna Katarzyna Karaszewska
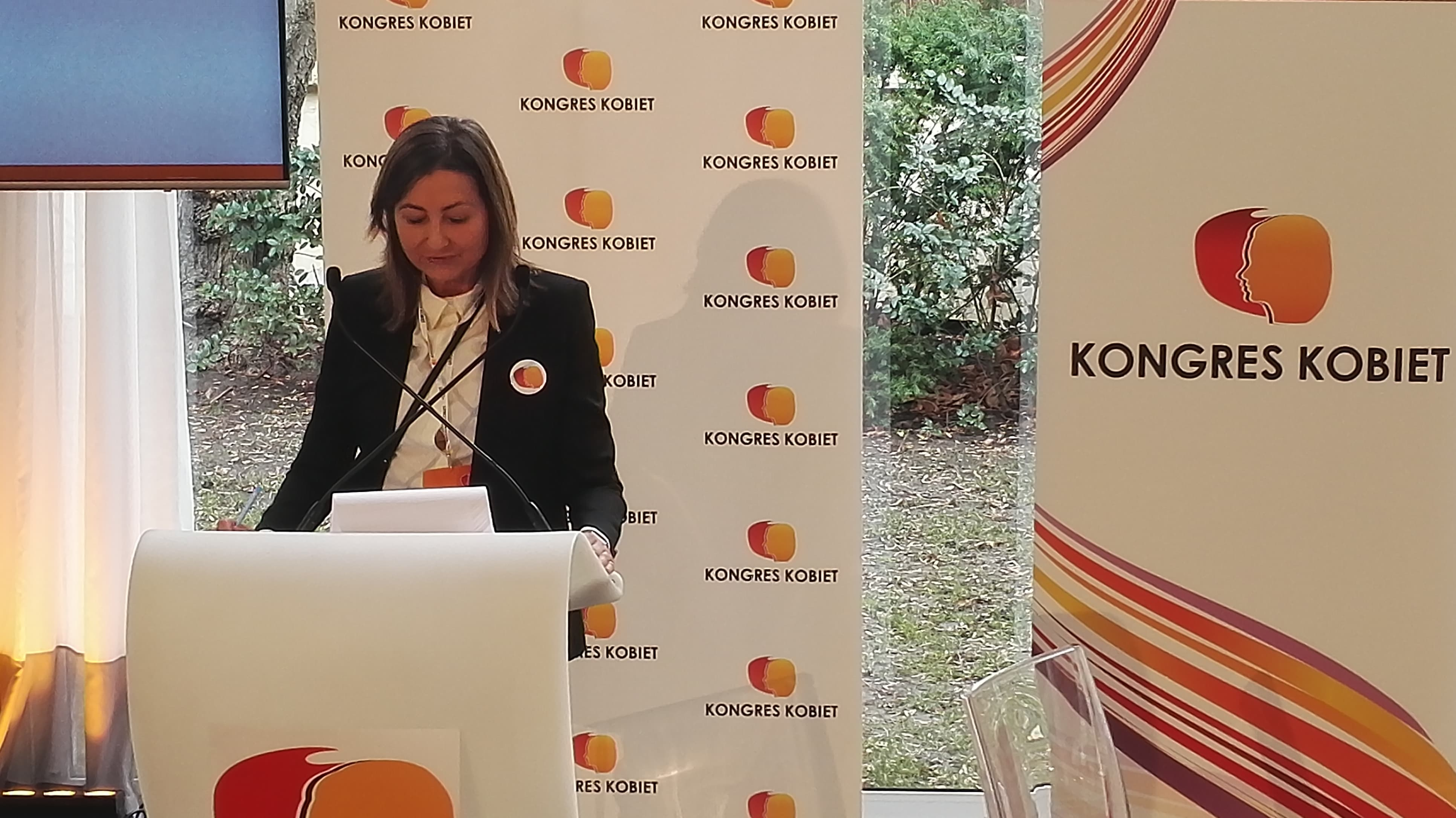
- Born: 1972 (age 53–54); Poland
- Education: Faculty of Philosophy and Sociology University of Warsaw
- Occupations: sociologist, economic and social activist
- Writing career
- Notable awards: Cross of Merit (Poland)

Anna Katarzyna Karaszewska (born March 10, 1970) is a Polish sociologist, economic and social activist and president of the board of the Congress of Women (2019–Present).

== Early life and education ==
Karaszewska graduated in sociology from the Faculty of Applied Social Sciences at the University of Warsaw, she continued her education in doctoral studies in the field of public and political promotion of women and graduated to gain both her MA and Ph.D. from Warsaw School of Economics. Furthermore, she gained an MA from the College of Europe, Bruges.

== Career ==
Karaszewska became faculty at the Warsaw School of Economics while lecturing at MA and postgraduate courses from 1999 to 2011. During 2009, she became one of the founding members of Poland's Women's Congress and later became its president.

Following this, Karaszewska co-created Poland's first national network of female entrepreneurs and a support system for further development among Polish women in 2012.

Additionally, during 2013–2014 Karaszewska went on to become the deputy general director at the confederation "Lewiatan", an organisation working to create favourable conditions for the development of the economy and entrepreneurship in Poland, for which Karaszewska organised their activities in Brussels.

During 2019, Karaszewska went on to be nominated to join the Warsaw Council for Women by the mayor of Warsaw. The council focuses on building equality and women's rights in addition to safety and support programs for women, vaccinations against HPV, and access to healthcare without the conscience clause.

== Awards and recognition ==
In 2005, Karaszewska was awarded the Silver Cross of Merit by the president of the Republic of Poland Aleksander Kwaśniewski. Additionally, she was a participant in the international mentoring program for women leaders, held by the U.S. Department of State and Fortune magazine.

== Personal life ==
Karaszewska is Polish and speaks English and French fluently.
