= Anna Osmakowicz =

Polish singer and actress

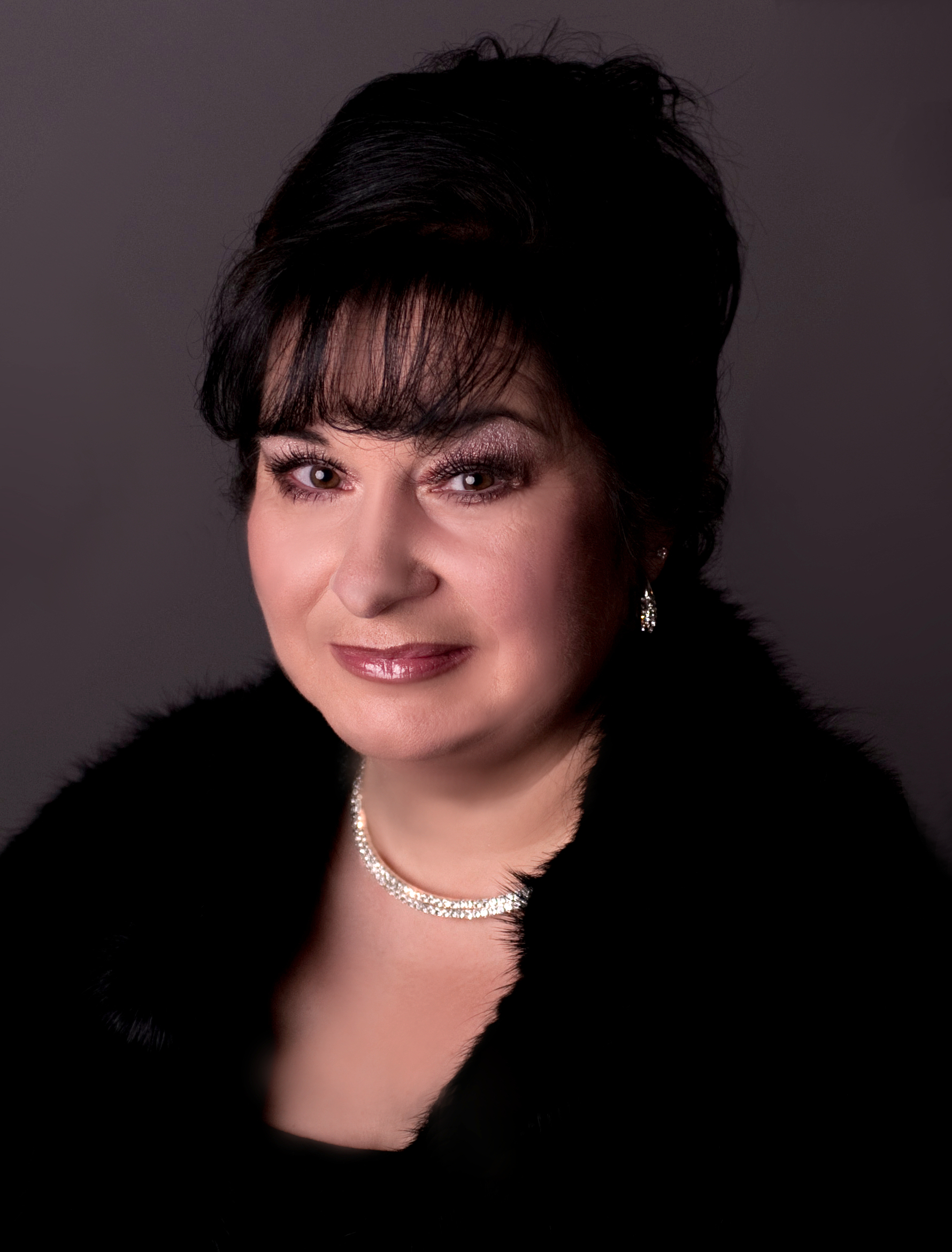
Anna Osmakowicz

Anna Osmakowicz (born 14 March 1963 in Warsaw) is a Polish singer and actress.

She studied piano, flute and singing and has taken part in several musicals, festivals and theatre plays such as "Orfeusz i Eurydyka w krainie tęczy", "Carmen", "Macbeth", "Otelo", "Fiddler on the Roof", and "Madame Butterfly".

== Discography ==
- 2005- En kristnaska hor (kolędy i pastorałki /esperanto)
- 2006 - Kristabia festo (kolędy i pastorałki /esperanto)
- 2008 - Wigilijna Noc (pastorałki)
- 2009 - Dzisiaj Wielkanoc
- 2009 - Intymny świat (ballady jazzowe)
- 2009 - Kolędy

=== Compilations ===
- 1990 - Piosenki Tadeusza Prejznera
- 1991 - Od Turowa jadę
- 1992 - Miłość ubrana w wiersze
- 1993 - Pastorałki i kolędy
- 1999 - Ojcze Święty śpiewamy dla Ciebie
- 2001 - Bilet do radości
- 2002 - Rzeka wspomnień
- 2005 - Pieśni dla Ojca Świętego Papieża Jana Pawła II
