= Anna Axfors =

Swedish writer and poet

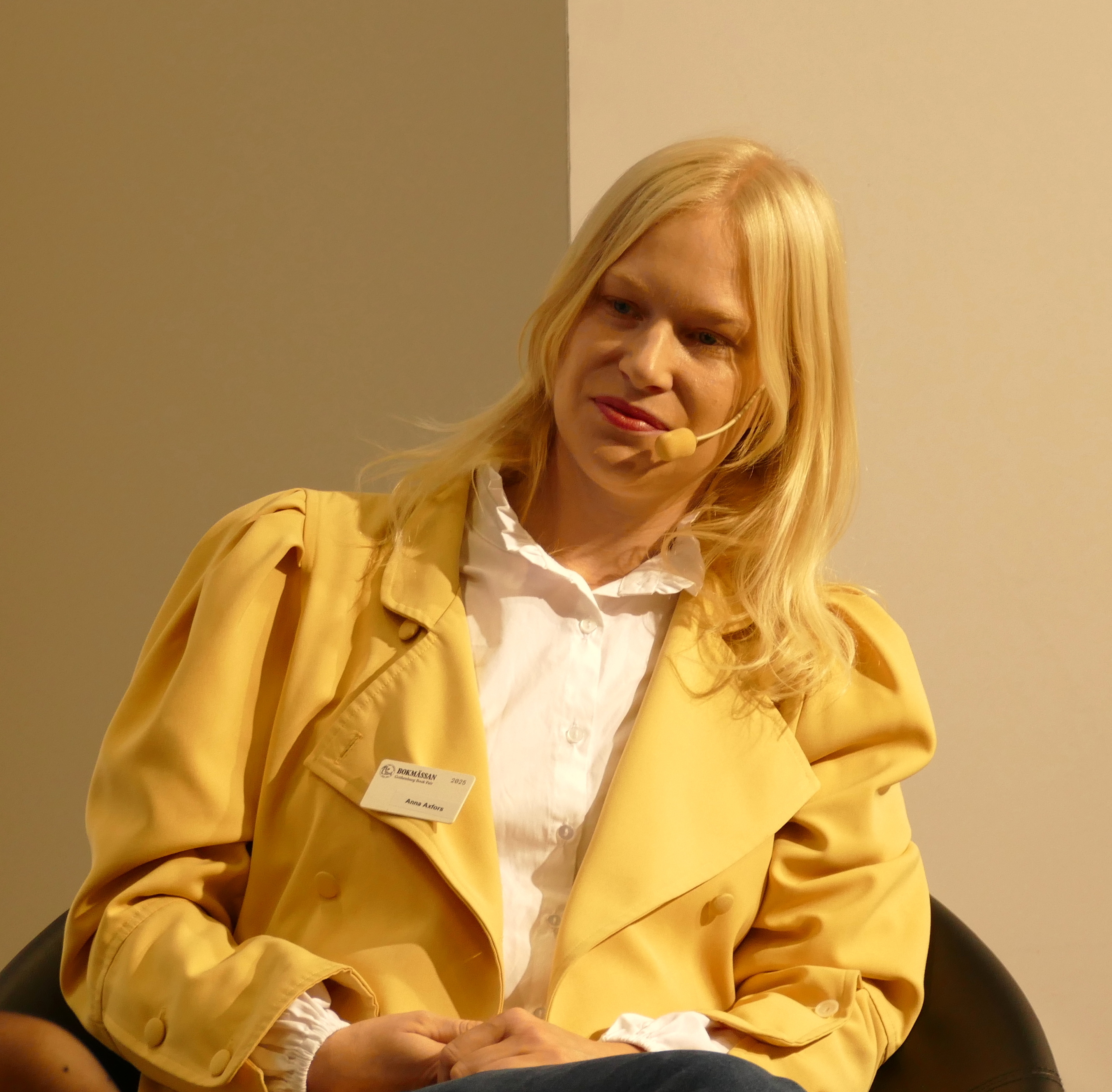
- Born: 17 October 1990 (age 35); Torpa parish, Sweden
- Occupation: Writer Poet

Anna Birgitta Axfors (born 17 October 1990) is a Swedish writer and poet.

In 2016, Anna Axfors was named one of Sweden's 20 most important young poets by newspaper Svenska Dagbladet.

== Bibliography ==
- Veckan innan (The week before), poetry, 2015
- Kärleksbrevet (The love letter), novel, 2016
- Jag hatar naturen (I hate nature), poetry, 2018 ISBN 978-91-87838-12-5.
- En dag i öknen (A day in the desert), novel, 2022
