= Anna Leon-Guerrero =

Sociologist

Anna Y. Leon-Guerrero is a sociologist. She is a professor in the Sociology Department at Pacific Lutheran University.

== Education and career ==
Leon-Guerrero graduated from Pacific University in 1983 with a BA in communications and sociology. She went on to University of California, Los Angeles for her graduate work, earning an MA in 1988, and a PhD in sociology in 1993.

== Publications ==
- Anna Leon-Guerrero. Social Problems: Community, Policy, and Social Action, (7th ed.) (2022). Thousand Oaks: Sage Publishing. ISBN 9781506362724
- Anna Leon-Guerrero, Chava Frankfort-Nachmias, Georgiann Davis. Essentials of Social Statistics for a Diverse Society, (4th ed.) (2020). Thousand Oaks: Sage Publishing. ISBN 9781452205830
- Frankfort-Nachmias, Chava; Leon-Guerrero, Anna (2018). Social statistics for a diverse society (8th ed.). Los Angeles. ISBN 978-1-5063-4720-2. OCLC 962442390.
- Anna Leon-Guerrero, Kristine Zentgraf.(ed.) Contemporary Readings in Social Problems (2008). Thousand Oaks: Sage Publishing. ISBN 978-1-4129-6530-9
