= Anna Azerli =

New Zealand-Italian singer and model

- Born: Anna Azerli; November 17, 1970 (age 55); Wellington, New Zealand
- Citizenship: Italy
- Occupations: Singer, model
- Years active: 2004-present
- Height: 175 cm (5 ft 9 in)

Anna Azerli (born 17 November 1970) is a New Zealand-born Italian pop-opera singer and model.

Born in Wellington, New Zealand, Anna has Italian citizenship, and during her career she performed on well-known stages like La Scala, Metropolitan Opera, Carnegie Hall and then signed a contract with Universal Music.

In 2014, she became popular after recording a song in Russian titled «Возьмите меня замуж, президент!» (”Marry me, Mr. President!”) addressed to Russian president Vladimir Putin.
