= Anna Vasilievna Maraeva =

Russian Industrialist (1845-1928)

Anna Vasilievna Maraeva (1845-1928), was a Russian industrialist. She was the daughter of Vasily and Makrina Volkovy and married to Methodius (Nefed) Vasilyevich Maraev (1830-1882). She was a prominent paper- and textile industrialist from 1884. She is known as a follower of the old orthodox religion and known as an art collector: her collection became the foundation of the Serpukhov Art Museum.
