= Anna Rasehorn =

German politician (born 1991)

Member of the Landtag of Bavaria
- Incumbent
- Assumed office 30 October 2023
- Constituency: Swabia

Personal details
- Born: 5 September 1991 (age 34)
- Party: Social Democratic Party (since 2009)

Anna Rasehorn (born 5 September 1991) is a German politician serving as a member of the Landtag of Bavaria since 2023. From 2014 to 2023, she was a city councillor of Augsburg.
