= Anna Uhrväder =

Finnish milliner

Anna Uhrväder (1759–1815), was a Finnish milliner active in Finland when it was part of Sweden and later when it was part of the Russian Empire.

She was based in Turku, which was the capital in Finland at the time. She manufactured as well as sold various fashion items. She had a successful career between 1804 and 1812, when she was the leading of her profession in Finland, with clients among the rich burgher class as well as the nobility.
