= Anna Zamora Puigceros =

Andorran politician

Anna Zamora Puigceros (born 9 October 1957) is an Andorran politician.

From 2005 to 2009 she was Chief of the Cabinet of the Chief of Government, and in 2012 she was Minister for Education and Youth.
