= Nancy (given name) =

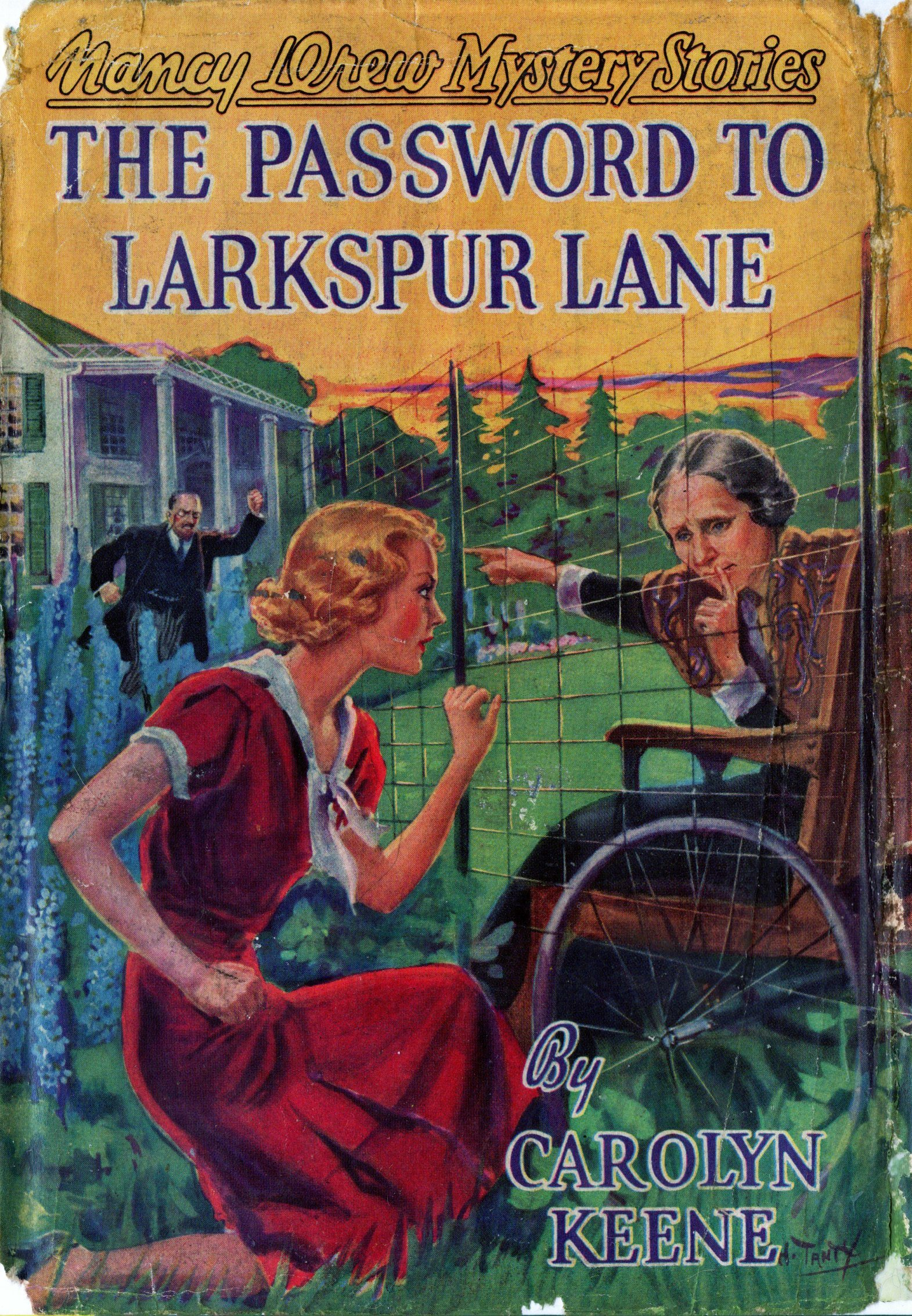
- Nancy Drew is a fictional bearer of the name.
- Pronunciation: /ˈnænsi/
- Gender: Female

Origin
- Origin: Agnes; Anne
- Meaning: "Favor, grace" (Anne) "Pure, holy" (Agnes)
- Region of origin: Europe

Other names
- Related names: Anne, Agnes
- Popularity: see popular names

Nancy is a feminine English language given name. The name Nancy was originally a diminutive form of Annis, a medieval English vernacular form of Agnes, which means "pure" or "holy". In some English dialects, "mine" was used instead of "my" and "Mine Ancy" eventually became Nancy. The name was also later used as an English diminutive of Anne, which is derived from the name Hannah, meaning favor or grace. It has been used as an independent name since the 18th century. In some instances it replaced variant Nanny, which was associated with the stereotype of a common, promiscuous woman from the 17th century onward. Spelling variants in use include Nancea, Nancee, Nancey, Nanci, Nancie, Nancsi, Nancye, Nanncey, Nanncy, Nansee, and Nansi. Similar names include Nan, Nance, Nanette, Nannerl, and Nannie.

== Usage ==
Nancy has been among the 1,000 most popular names for girls in the United States since 1880. It was among the top 100 most popular names for American girls between 1919 and 1978 and was at the height of its popularity between 1934 and 1955, when it was among the top 10 most popular names for American girls. It has since declined in use and was the 965th most popular name for newborn American girls in 2025. Its greatest popularity in Canada and New Zealand was also in the 20th century. The name has increased in use in England and Wales in recent years, where it has been among the 100 most popular names for newborn girls since 2014.

Nancy may refer to:

== People ==
- Nancy A. Becker (born 1955), American attorney and judge
- Nancy A. Hewitt (born 1951), American women historian
- Nancy A. Leatherwood (1872–1961), American club woman
- Nancy A. Monteiro-Riviere, American toxicologist
- Nancy A. Moran (born 1954), American evolutionary biologist, entomologist, and professor
- Nancy A. Roseman, American professor of biology
- Nancy Abelmann (1959–2016), American anthropologist and professor
- Nancy Abramson, American hazzan
- Nancy Abu-Bonsrah, American brain surgeon
- Nancy Abudu (born 1974), American lawyer and circuit judge
- Nancy Achebe (born 1962), Nigerian professor of library and information science
- Nancy Acora, Ugandan politician and legislator
- Nancy Adajania (born 1971), Indian cultural theorist, art critic, and independent curator
- Nancy Adam (1888–1982), Scottish trade union officer
- Nancy Adams (disambiguation), several people
- Nancy Addison (1946–2002), American actress
- Nancy Adkin Ritchie (1916–1964), New Zealand artist
- Nancy Adleman (1949–1997), American murder victim
- Nancy Adler (1946–2024), American health psychologist
- Nancy Agabian, American writer, activist, and teacher
- Nancy Agag (born 1979), Sudanese singer-songwriter and recording artist
- Nancy Agee (born 1955), American business executive
- Nancy Ajram (born 1983), Lebanese singer, television personality, and businesswoman
- Nancy Aldama (born 1946), Cuban gymnast
- Nancy Alexiadi (born 1981), Greek singer
- Nancy Allan (born 1952), Canadian politician
- Nancy Allbritton, American professor of bioengineering
- Nancy Allen, several people
- Nancy Alonso (1949–2018), Cuban biologist, university professor, and writer
- Nancy Alvarez, several people
- Nancy Amelia Woodbury Priest Wakefield (1836–1870), American poet
- Nancy Ames (born 1937), American folk singer and songwriter
- Nancy Ames (scientist), Canadian scientist
- Nancy Ammerman (born 1950), American professor of sociology of religion
- Nancy Andrew (1947–1998), American-born Japanese-English translator
- Nancy Andrews, several people
- Nancy Angelo (born 1953), American organizational psychologist and performance- and video artist
- Nancy Ann Cynthia Francis, Indian politician
- Nancy-Ann DeParle (born 1956), American politician
- Nancy Anne Sakovich (born 1961), Canadian actress and model
- Nancy Antonio (born 1996), Mexican professional footballer
- Nancy Apple, American musician, songwriter, producer, radio personality, NARAS executive, and owner of Ringo Records
- Nancy April (ca. 1801–1829), Canadian artist
- Nancy Aptanik (born 1959), Canadian Inuk artist
- Nancy Arana-Daniel, Mexican computer scientist
- Nancy Archibald (1911–1996), Canadian fencer
- Nancy Argenta (born 1957), Canadian soprano singer
- Nancy Argentino (died 1983), American murder victim
- Nancy Argenziano (born 1955), American politician
- Nancy Arlen (1942–2006), American sculptor and musician
- Nancy Armstrong (born 1938), American scholar, critic, and professor of English
- Nancy Ascher, American surgeon
- Nancy Asire (1945–2021), American fantasy- and science fiction author
- Nancy Astor, Viscountess Astor (1879–1954), American-born British politician
- Nancy Atakan (born 1946), Turkish visual artist
- Nancy Atherton, American writer and author
- Nancy Atiez (1957–2016), Cuban basketball player
- Nancy Atkinson (1910–1999), Australian bacteriologist
- Nancy Atlas (born 1949), American district judge
- Nancy Augustyniak Goffi (born 1979), American professional soccer player
- Nancy Austin (born c. 1949), American writer and business consultant
- Nancy Avesyan (born 1990), American-born Armenian footballer
- Nancy Azara (1939–2024), American sculptor
- Nancy B. Firestone (1951–2022), American senior judge
- Nancy B. Jackson (1956–2022), American chemist
- Nancy B. Moody, American nurse
- Nancy B. Olson (1936–2018), American librarian and educator
- Nancy B. Pettit (born 1953), American diplomat
- Nancy B. Reich (1924–2019), American musicologist
- Nancy Bailey (1863–1913), English indexer and pioneer
- Nancy Baker, several people
- Nancy Balfour (1911–1997), English arts administrator and journalist
- Nancy Ballance, American politician
- Nancy Banks-Smith, British television and radio critic
- Nancy Barbato (1917–2018), American wife of singer and actor Frank Sinatra
- Nancy Barnes (born 1961), American journalist and newspaper editor
- Nancy Baron, American rock singer
- Nancy Barrett (born 1941), American actress
- Nancy Barr Mavity (1890–1959), American crime mystery author
- Nancy Barry, American banker
- Nancy Barto, American politician
- Nancy Bates, several people
- Nancy Batson Crews (1920–2001), American politician
- Nancy Bauer (born 1934), Canadian writer and editor
- Nancy Bauer (philosopher), American philosopher
- Nancy Baxter, Canadian surgeon and professor
- Nancy Bayley (1899–1994), American psychologist
- Nancy Baym (born 1965), American scholar, scientist, writer, mass media theorist, and professor
- Nancy Bea (1936–2025), American stadium organist for MLB's Los Angeles Dodgers
- Nancy Beals (born 1938), American politician
- Nancy Beaton (1909–1999), English socialite
- Nancy Beatty, Canadian stage-, film-, and television actress
- Nancy Beckage (1950–2012), American entomologist
- Nancy Beiman, American-Canadian director, character designer, teacher, and animator
- Nancy Bélanger (born 1978), Canadian curler
- Nancy Bell (1924–1989), Canadian politician
- Nancy Bell (author) (1844–1933), British translator and author of partial Belgian descent
- Nancy Bell-Johnstone (born 1959), American biathlete
- Nancy Benoit (1964–2007), American professional wrestling manager
- Nancy Bentley, American professor of English, journal editor, and non-fiction writer
- Nancy Berg (1931–2022), American model and actress
- Nancy Berliner (born 1954), American hematologist
- Nancy Bermeo, American political scientist, non-fiction writer, and researcher
- Nancy Bernkopf Tucker (1948–2012), American diplomat, writer, and diplomatic historian
- Nancy Bernstein (1960–2015), American visual effects producer
- Nancy Berry, American politician
- Nancy Berryhill, American government official
- Nancy Bertler, German Antarctic researcher and professor
- Nancy Binay (born 1973), Filipina politician
- Nancy Birdsall (born 1946), American economist
- Nancy Bird Walton (1915–2009), Australian pioneering aviator
- Nancy Birtwhistle, English contestant on The Great British Bake Off
- Nancy Bishop (born 1966), American casting director
- Nancy Blachman (born 1956), American educator
- Nancy Blanche Jenison (1876–1960), American physician
- Nancy Bocanegra (born 1955), American convicted kidnapper
- Nancy Boettger (born 1943), American politician
- Nancy Bogen (born 1932), American author-scholar, mixed media producer, and digital artist
- Nancy Boggess (1925–2019), American astrophysicist
- Nancy Bolton (1913 – 2008), Australian artist and teacher
- Nancye Wynne Bolton (1916–2001), Australian tennis player
- Nancy Bond (born 1945), American author of children's literature
- Nancy Bonini (born 1959), American neuroscientist and geneticist
- Nancy Bonvillain (born 1945), American professor
- Nancy Borgenicht (born 1942), American film- and television actress
- Nancy Borlase (1914–2006), New Zealand-born Australian artist, art critic, and commentator
- Nancy Borowick (born 1985), American artist, photographer, and author
- Nancy Borwick (1935–2013), Australian athlete
- Nancy Bowen, American visual artist
- Nancy Boyd, several people
- Nancy Boyda (born 1955), American chemist and politician
- Nancy Brataas (1928–2014), American politician and consultant
- Nancy Brickhouse (born 1960), American academic
- Nancy Brilli (born 1964), Italian film-, television-, and stage actress
- Nancy Brinker (born 1946), American ambassador, activist, politician, and businesswoman
- Nancy Brown, several people
- Nancy Browne (1913–1996), New Zealand cricketer
- Nancy Brunning (1971–2019), New Zealand actress, director, and writer
- Nancy Bryan Faircloth (1930–2010), American heiress and philanthropist
- Nancy Brysson Morrison (1903–1986), Scottish writer
- Nancy Buchanan (born 1946), American artist
- Nancy Buckingham (1924–2022), British writer
- Nancy Buffington (1939–2021), American politician
- Nancy Buirski (1945–2023), American filmmaker, producer, and photographer
- Nancy Burley (1930–2013), Australian figure skater
- Nancy Burne (1907–1954), English stage- and film actress
- Nancy Burson (born 1948), American artist
- Nancy Butler Songer, American educational theorist
- Nancy Buttfield (1912–2005), Australian politician
- Nancy Byrd Turner (1880–1971), American poet, editor, and lecturer
- Nancy C. Jordan, American educator
- Nancy C. Kranich, American librarian
- Nancy C. Kula (born 1971), Zambian linguist
- Nancy C. Maryboy, Native American scientist
- Nancy C. Unger, American historian, professor, and author
- Nancy Cadogan (born 1979), British figurative painter
- Nancy Caffyn (1934–2010), American politician
- Nancy Caldwell, multiple people
- Nancy Calef, American contemporary figurative painter, illustrator, author, speaker, singer, and songwriter
- Nancy Calhoun (born 1944), American politician
- Nancy Cameron, American 1974 Playboy model
- Nancy Campbell (born 1978), British poet, non-fiction writer, and publisher of artist's books
- Nancy Cantor (born 1952), American academic administrator
- Nancy Cappello (1952–2018), American breast cancer activist
- Nancy Cárdenas (1934–1994), Mexican actress, poet, writer, and feminist
- Nancy Carell (born 1966), American comedian, actress, and writer
- Nancy Carline (1909–2004), British artist
- Nancy Carlson, American politician
- Nancy Carman (born 1950), American ceramist
- Nancy Carnevale, American professor of history
- Nancy Carole Tyler (1939–1965), American secretary
- Nancy Caroline (1944–2002), American physician and writer
- Nancy Carpenter, American illustrator of children's picture books
- Nancy Carrasco, Mexican professor and physiologist
- Nancy Carrillo (born 1986), Cuban volleyball player
- Nancy Carriuolo, American college director
- Nancy Carroll (American actress) (1903–1965), American actress
- Nancy Carroll (British actress) (born 1974), British actress
- Nancy Cartonio (born 1977), American folk musician, songwriter, and music producer
- Nancy Cartwright (born 1957), American actress
- Nancy Cartwright (philosopher) (born 1944), American philosopher of science, and professor
- Nancy Casallas (born 1981), Colombian cyclist
- Nancy Cassis (born 1944), American politician
- Nancy Castiglione (born 1981), Canadian actress, model, and singer
- Nancy Caswell (1913–1987), American film actress
- Nancy Catamco (born 1969), Filipino politician
- Nancy Cato (1917–2000), Australian writer and poet
- Nancy Cave (1896–c. 1989), English squash player
- Nancy Celis (born 1966), German volleyball player
- Nancy Chabot (born 1972), American planetary scientist
- Nancy Chaffee (1929–2002), American tennis player
- Nancy Chamberlain, American disputed wife of Brigham Young
- Nancy Chaola Mdooko, Malawian politician
- Nancy Chard (1933–2010), American politician
- Nancy Charest (1959–2014), Canadian politician
- Nancy Charlton (born 1962), Canadian field hockey player
- Nancy Charton (1920–2015), South African Anglican priest
- Nancy Chelangat Koech (born 1995), Kenyan visually impaired Paralympic athlete
- Nancy Chemtob (born 1965), American family law attorney
- Nancy Chen (born 1988), American television journalist
- Nancy Chepkwemoi (born 1993), Kenyan professional middle-distance runner
- Nancy Cherop (born 2006), Kenyan athlete
- Nancy Chodorow (1944–2025), American sociologist and psychoanalyst
- Nancy Chunn (born 1941), American artist
- Nancy Churnin, American author, journalist, and theater critic
- Nancy Clark, several people
- Nancy Clarke, several people
- Nancy Clem, American murder suspect
- Nancy Clutter (1943–1959), American murder victim
- Nancy Coats-Ashley, American lawyer and district judge
- Nancy Cohen, American visual artist
- Nancy Cole (psychologist), American educational psychologist and expert on educational assessment
- Nancy Cole (mathematician) (1902–1991), American mathematician
- Nancy Coleman (1912–2000), American film-, stage-, television-, and radio actress
- Nancy Collins, several people
- Nancy Columbia (1893–1959), American performer in silent films
- Nancy Combs, American legal scholar
- Nancy Condee, American professor of language and literature
- Nancy Conn (1919–2013), Scottish bacteriologist
- Nancy Conrad (born 1942), American teacher, author, publisher, entrepreneur, and public speaker
- Nancy Contreras (born 1978), Mexican track cyclist
- Nancy Conz (1957–2017), American long-distance runner
- Nancy Cook (1884–1962), American suffragist, educator, political organizer, and businesswoman
- Nancy Cooke de Herrera (1922–2013), American socialite, fashion expert, and author
- Nancy Coolen (born 1973), Dutch television presenter and singer
- Nancy Coonsman (1887–1976), American sculptor
- Nancy Cooper, American journalist and news executive
- Nancy Cooperstein (born 1939), American theatrical producer and television director
- Nancy Coover Andreasen (born 1938), American neuroscientist and neuropsychiatrist
- Nancy Cordes (born 1974), American journalist
- Nancy Cornelius (1861–1908), Native American nurse
- Nancy Corrigan (1912–1983), Irish-born American aviator, nursemaid, and fashion model
- Nancy Cowperthwaite-Phillips (1921–2017), American track and field athlete
- Nancy Cox, several people
- Nancy Cozean (born 1947), American mayor
- Nancy Craig, American professor emeriti of molecular biology and genetics
- Nancy Crampton Brophy (born 1950), American convicted murderer
- Nancy Crawford (born 1941), American 1959 Playboy model
- Nancy Cressy (1780–1871), American wife of Brigham Young
- Nancy Crick (1932–2002), Australian suicide victim
- Nancy Criss (born 1960), American producer, awards director, and actress
- Nancy Crooker (born 1944), American physicist and professor emeriti of space physics
- Nancy Crow (born 1943), American art quilter and fiber artist
- Nancy Cruickshank, British entrepreneur in beauty, fashion, and technology
- Nancy Cruzan (1957–1990), American who was legally euthanized
- Nancy Cuenco, Filipina politician
- Nancy Cunard (1896–1965), British writer, heiress, and political activist
- Nancy Cuomo (born 1946), Italian singer and producer
- Nancy Curlee, American soap opera writer
- Nancy Cusick (1924–2010), American painter
- Nancy D. Erbe (born 1956), American negotiation-, conflict resolution-, and peace-building professor
- Nancy D. Freudenthal (born 1954), American senior district judge
- Nancy Dahlstrom (born 1957), American politician
- Nancy Dahn (born 1968), Canadian violinist and professor
- Nancy Dalberg (1881–1949), Danish composer
- Nancy Darling, American psychologist and academic
- Nancy Darsch (1951–2020), American women's basketball coach
- Nancy Daruwalla (born 1987), Maharashtrian cricketer
- Nancy Davenport (born 1965), Canadian photographer
- Nancy Davidson, several people
- Nancy Davis (disambiguation), several people
- Nancy Dawson (c. 1728–1767), English dancer and actress
- Nancy De Boer, American politician
- Nancy Deano, Filipino former swimmer
- Nancy Debenham (c. 1906–?), twin sister of Betty Debenham; British motorcyclist and sports journalist
- Nancy Delahunt (born 1959), Canadian curler
- Nancy Dell'Olio (born 1961), Italian lawyer
- Nancy Deloye Fitzroy (1927–2024), American engineer
- Nancy Dembowski (1934–2025), American politician
- Nancy DeMoss Wolgemuth (born 1958), American evangelical teacher, public speaker, and radio personality
- Nancy Denson, American mayor
- Nancy Denton, American sociologist and professor
- Nancy DeShone (1932–2007), American professional baseball player
- Nancy DeStefanis, American environmental educator, field ornithologist, and lecturer
- Nancy Detert (1944–2023), American politician
- Nancy Dexter (1923–1983), Australian journalist
- Nancy Diamond (1941–2017), Canadian municipal politician
- Nancy Díaz (born 1973), Argentine international footballer
- Nancy Dick (born 1930), American politician
- Nancy Dickerson (1927–1997), American radio- and television journalist and researcher
- Nancy Dickey (born 1950), American physician
- Nancy Dillow (1928–2021), Canadian museum director, curator, and writer
- Nancy DiNardo (born 1949/1950), American politician and commercial real estate owner
- Nancy Dine (1937–2020), American filmmaker
- Nancy Ditz (born 1954), American long-distance runner
- Nancy Diuguid (1948–2003), American theater director
- Nancy Dix, American politician
- Nancy Doe (born 1949), Liberian First Lady
- Nancy Dolman (1951–2010), Canadian comedic actress and singer
- Nancy Donahue (born 1958), American fashion model and actress
- Nancy Dorian (1936–2024), American linguist
- Nancy Douglas Bowditch (1890–1979), American artist, author, costumer, and set designer
- Nancy Dow (1936–2016), American television- and film actress
- Nancy Dowd (born 1945), American screenwriter
- Nancy Drolet (born 1973), Canadian ice hockey player, international public speaker, and philanthropist
- Nancy Duarte, American writer, speaker, and CEO
- Nancy Dubuc (born 1968/1969), American businesswoman
- Nancy Dudney, American materials scientist
- Nancy Duff Campbell (born 1943), American lawyer
- Nancy Duffy (1939–2006), American news reporter, news anchor, and newspaper- and television personality
- Nancy Duffy Blount, American politician
- Nancy Dumont (1936–2002), Native American educational leader
- Nancy Dunkel (born 1955), American politician
- Nancy Dunkle (born 1955), American basketball player
- Nancy Dupláa (born 1969), Argentine actress
- Nancy Dupree (1927–2017), American historian
- Nancy Durham, Canadian journalist
- Nancy Durrant, English journalist and art critic
- Nancy Dussault (born 1936), American actress and singer
- Nancy Dutiel (born 1952), American model
- Nancy Dwyer (born 1954), American contemporary artist
- Nancy Dye (1947–2015), American historian, philosopher, and college academic
- Nancy Dyer Gray (1932–2020), American businesswoman and conservationist
- Nancy E. Bone, American intelligence officer
- Nancy E. Brasel (born 1969), American district judge
- Nancy E. Dunlap, American physician, researcher, and business administrator
- Nancy E. Gary (1937–2006), American professor and health care chief executive
- Nancy E. Goeken, American immunologist
- Nancy E. Gwinn (1945–2024), American librarian and administrator
- Nancy E. Heckman, Canadian statistician
- Nancy E. Krulik, American novelist
- Nancy E. Lane, American rheumatologist
- Nancy E. Levinger, American chemistry professor
- Nancy E. McIntyre, American landscape ecologist
- Nancy E. Rice (born 1950), American Supreme Court judge and lawyer
- Nancy Eaton (1961–1985), Canadian heiress
- Nancy Edberg (1832–1892), Swedish swimmer
- Nancy Edell (1942–2005), American-born Canadian artist
- Nancy Edwards (born 1954), British archaeologist and academic
- Nancy Eiesland (1964–2009), American professor
- Nancy Eimers (born 1954), American poet
- Nancy Eisenberg (born 1950), American psychologist and professor
- Nancy Ekholm Burkert (born 1933), American artist and illustrator
- Nancy Elder (1915–1981), Scottish chess master
- Nancy Elizabeth (born 1983), English folk singer-songwriter and multi-instrumentalist
- Nancy Elizabeth Prophet (1890–1960), American artist and sculptor
- Nancy Elizabeth Wallace (born 1948), American children's book author and illustrator
- Nancy Ellen Craig (1927–2015), American painter
- Nancy Ellicott Tomlinson (1884–1958), American psychiatric social worker
- Nancy Ellis (1915–1982), Australian aviator
- Nancy Erickson, American political aide
- Nancy Eriksson (1907–1984), Swedish politician
- Nancy Etchemendy (born 1952), American writer of science fiction-, fantasy-, and horror novels
- Nancy Etcoff (born 1955), American psychologist and researcher
- Nancy Evans, several people
- Nancy Everhard (born 1957), American actress
- Nancy Ezer (1947–2022), American author, instructor, scholar, critic, and lecturer of Hebrew
- Nancy F. Cott (born 1945), American historian and professor
- Nancy F. Peternal, American politician
- Nancy Fabiola Herrera, Venezuela-born Canarian mezzo-soprano opera singer
- Nancy Faeser (born 1970), German politician
- Nancy Fahey (born 1958), American head women's basketball coach
- Nancy Falkow (1970–2020), American singer-songwriter and musician
- Nancy Farmer (born 1941), American writer of children's and young adult books and science fiction
- Nancy Farmer (politician) (born 1956), American politician
- Nancy Farriss (born 1938), American historian and professor emerita
- Nancy Faust (born 1947), American stadium organist for the MLB's Chicago White Sox
- Nancy Feber (born 1976), Belgian tennis player
- Nancy Feldman (1922–2014), American civil rights activist and longtime educator
- Nancy Felson, American author, scholar, and professor of classical studies
- Nancy Ferlatte, Canadian make-up artist
- Nancy Fichman, American film- and television writer
- Nancy Fiddler (born 1956), American cross-country skier
- Nancy Filteau (born 1962), Canadian judoka
- Nancy Fish (1850–1927), English socialite
- Nancy Fitz (born 1967), American rugby union player
- Nancy Flanagan (born 1929), British local community worker and rights activist
- Nancy Flavin (born 1950), American politician
- Nancy Fleming (born 1942), American beauty pageant titleholder
- Nancy Fleurival (born c. 1985), Guadeloupean beauty pageant contestant
- Nancy Floreen (born 1951), American politician
- Nancy Flournoy (born 1947), American statistician
- Nancy Floyd (born 1956), American photographer
- Nancy Fogarty (born 1934), Australian sprinter
- Nancy Folbre (born 1952), American feminist economist
- Nancy Foner, American sociologist, professor, and author
- Nancy Ford Cones (1869–1962), American early photographer
- Nancy Forde, Canadian biophysicist
- Nancy Foster (?-2000), American marine biologist
- Nancy Fouts (1945–2019), American sculptural artist and graphic designer
- Nancy Frangione (1953–2023), American soap opera actress
- Nancy Frankel (1929–2021), American sculptor
- Nancy Frankenberry (born 1947), American philosopher of religion, and professor emeritus
- Nancy Fraser (born 1947), American philosopher, critical theorist, feminist, and professor
- Nancy Freedman (1920–2010), American feminist novelist
- Nancy French (born 1974), American writer
- Nancy Friday (1933–2017), American author
- Nancy Friedemann-Sánchez (born 1961), Colombian-American contemporary artist
- Nancy Friedman, American customer service- and telephone skills consultant
- Nancy Friese (born 1948), American visual artist and educator
- Nancy Fugate Woods, American emeriti professor in biobehavioral nursing and health informatics
- Nancy Fulda, American science fiction writer, editor, and computer scientist
- Nancy Fuller (born 1949), American chef and businesswoman
- Nancy Funk (1951–2018), American basketball coach
- Nancy G. Groenwegen, American politician
- Nancy G. Love, American engineer
- Nancy G. Wallace, American politician
- Nancy Galbraith (born 1951), American postmodern/postminimalist composer
- Nancy Gallini, Canadian economist, professor emeritus, researcher, and author
- Nancy Ganz (born 1955), American undergarment entrepreneur
- Nancy Garapick (1961–2026), Canadian competition swimmer, Olympic medallist, and former world record-holder
- Nancy Garden (1938–2014), American writer of fiction
- Nancy Gardner Prince (1799-c. 1859), American writer
- Nancy Garland (born 1954), American politician
- Nancy Garlock Edmunds (born 1947), American senior district judge
- Nancy Garrido (born 1955), American wife of sex offender and kidnapper Phillip Garrido
- Nancy Gates (1926–2019), American film- and television actress
- Nancy Gathungu, Kenyan politician
- Nancy Gaymala Yunupingu (c. 1935–2005), Australian artist and matriarch
- Nancy-Gay Rotstein, Canadian poet and novelist
- Nancy Gee (born 1968), Canadian alpine skier
- Nancy Geller (born 1944), American biostatistician
- Nancy Genn (born 1929), American artist and papermaker
- Nancy Genzel Abouke (born 2003), Nauruan weightlifter
- Nancy Gertner (born 1946), American district judge
- Nancy Gibbs (born 1960), American essayist, speaker, and presidential historian
- Nancy Giles (born 1960), American actress and commentator
- Nancy Gillespie (born 1948), New Zealand-born Western Australian author
- Nancy Glass (born 1955), American chief executive, writer, and television- and radio host
- Nancy Glenn-Nieto (born 1944), American-Mexican actress, model, and fine art painter
- Nancy Golden, education leader in Oregon
- Nancy Goldman Nossal (c. 1937–2006), American molecular biologist
- Nancy Goldring (born 1945), American artist
- Nancy Goldsmith (born 1966), Israeli Olympic gymnast
- Nancy González (disambiguation), several people
- Nancy Gooch, African American settler in California
- Nancy Gordon, American economist and statistician
- Nancy Goroff (born 1968), American organic chemist
- Nancy Grace (born 1959), American legal commentator, television journalist, and prosecutor
- Nancy Grant, French-Québécois Canadian film producer
- Nancy Grasmick, American school superintendent
- Nancy Graves (1939–1995), American sculptor, painter, printmaker, and filmmaker
- Nancy Green (1834–1923), American slave, nanny, cook, and model
- Nancy Green (cellist) (born 1952), American cellist
- Nancy Greene Raine (born 1943), Canadian senator and alpine skier
- Nancy Grimm, American ecosystem ecologist and professor
- Nancy Grossman (born 1940), American artist
- Nancy Gruver (1931–1990), American bridge player
- Nancy Guadalupe Sánchez Arredondo (born 1965), Mexican politician
- Nancy Guenst, American politician
- Nancy Guerra, American psychologist
- Nancy Guild (1925–1999), American film actress
- Nancy Guillemette, Canadian politician
- Nancy Guillén (born 1976), Salvadoran hammer thrower
- Nancy Guppy, American comedian and television personality
- Nancy Guptill (1941–2020), Canadian politician
- Nancy Gustafson (born 1956), American opera singer
- Nancy Gutiérrez, several people
- Nancy Guttmann Slack (1930–2022), American plant ecologist, bryologist, and historian of science
- Nancy Guy, American politician
- Nancy H. Adsit (1825–1902), American art lecturer, art educator, and writer
- Nancy H. Hensel (born 1943), American academic and university administrator
- Nancy H. Kleinbaum (1948–2024), American writer and journalist
- Nancy H. Nielsen, American physician
- Nancy H. Rogers (born 1948), American lawyer, author, and dean
- Nancy Haberland (born 1960), American sailor
- Nancy Hadley, American model and actress
- Nancy Haegel, American electrical engineer, materials scientist, and solar power researcher
- Nancy Hafkin, American-born South African computer scientist
- Nancy Haigh (born 1946), American set decorator
- Nancy Haigwood, American scientist
- Nancy Hale (1908–1988), American novelist and short-story writer
- Nancy Hall (1904–1991), American politician
- Nancy Hallam, American actress
- Nancy Halliday Ely-Raphel (born 1937), American diplomat
- Nancy Hamilton (1908–1985), American actress, playwright, lyricist, director, and producer
- Nancy Handabile, Zambian actress, journalist, and filmmaker
- Nancy Hanks (disambiguation), several people
- Nancy Hann, American NOAA rear admiral
- Nancy Hansen, Canadian mountaineer
- Nancy Harkness Love (1914–1976), American pilot, airplane commander, and spokesperson
- Nancy Harman (born 1999), English cricketer
- Nancy Harrington (1926–2020), American politician
- Nancy Harris, Irish playwright and screenwriter
- Nancy Harrow (born 1930), American jazz singer and songwriter
- Nancy Hart (c. 1735–1830), American rebel heroine
- Nancy Hart Douglas (1846–?), American scout, guide, and spy for the Confederacy
- Nancy Hartling (born 1950), Canadian politician
- Nancy Hartsock (1943–2015), American professor of political science and women studies
- Nancy Harwood, American 1968 Playboy model
- Nancye Hayes (born 1943), Australian actress
- Nancy Hayfield, American author, editor, and publisher
- Nancy Haynes (born 1947), American artist
- Nancy Hazel, British sociologist and academic
- Nancy Heche (born 1937), American activist, author, and counselor
- Nancy Heiss, American figure skater
- Nancy Helm-Estabrooks, American emeritus professor of language
- Nancy Hemenway Barton (1920–2008), American artist
- Nancy Hendrickson (born 1950), American actress, director, producer, and writer
- Nancy Hennings, American new-age musician
- Nancy Henry, several people
- Nancy Heppner (born 1971), Canadian politician
- Nancy Hernandez (born c. 1945), American eugenic
- Nancy "Pili" Hernandez (born 1980), Irish interdisciplinary artist and activist
- Nancy Hetherington, American politician
- Nancy Hewins (1902–1978), British theater director and actress
- Nancy Hicks Maynard (1946–2008), American publisher and journalist
- Nancy Higgins (born 1954), Canadian rower
- Nancy Hill, several people
- Nancy Hiller (1959–2022), American cabinetmaker, period furniture maker, and author
- Nancy Hingston, American mathematician
- Nancy Hirschmann (born 1956), American political scientist
- Nancy Ho (born 1936), Chinese-American molecular biologist
- Nancy Hodges (1888–1969), Canadian journalist and politician
- Nancy Hogg, British immunologist
- Nancy Hogshead-Makar (born 1962), American swimmer
- Nancy Holder (born 1953), American writer and editor
- Nancy Holland (born 1942), Canadian alpine skier
- Nancy Hollander (born 1944), American criminal defense lawyer
- Nancy Hollister (born 1949), American politician
- Nancy Holloway (1932–2019), American jazz-, pop-, and soul singer and actress
- Nancy Holmes (born 1959), Canadian poet and educator
- Nancy Holt (1938–2014), American artist
- Nancy Hom (born 1949), Chinese-born American artist
- Nancy Honey (born 1948), American documentary- and portrait photographer
- Nancy Honeytree (born 1952), American Christian musician
- Nancy Hopkins, several people
- Nancy Horan, American author of historical fiction
- Nancy Horner (1925–1984), Scottish badminton player- and official
- Nancy Horrocks (1900–1989), British artist
- Nancy Houk, American astronomer
- Nancy Hower (born 1966), American actress, director, screenwriter, and producer
- Nancy Hoyt, American contestant on The Amazing Race (American TV series)
- Nancy Hsueh (1941–1980), American actress
- Nancy Huang, American poet
- Nancy Hubbard (born 1963), American author and professor of business and management
- Nancy Huddleston Packer (1925–2025), American writer of short fiction and memoir, and professor
- Nancy Hult Ganis (born c. 1948), American television and film publicist, writer, producer, and developer
- Nancy Huntly, American ecologist and professor
- Nancy Huston (born 1953), Canadian novelist and essayist
- Nancy Huston Banks (1849–1934), American journalist, literary critic, and novelist
- Nancy I. Williams, American kinesiologist
- Nancy Illoh, Nigerian journalist, TV presenter, and media consultant
- Nancy Ip (born 1955), Hong Kong neuroscientist
- Nancy Isenberg, American historian and professor
- Nancy Isime (born 1991), Nigerian actress, model, and media personality
- Nancy Iza Moreno, Kichwa leader
- Nancy J. Adler (born 1948), American professor of organizational behavior
- Nancy J. Currie-Gregg (born 1958), American engineer, U.S. Army officer, and NASA astronaut
- Nancy J. Duff (born 1951), American professor of theology
- Nancy J. Holland (1947–2020), American philosopher
- Nancy J. Lescavage (born 1950), American rear admiral
- Nancy J. Nersessian (born 1947), American academic scientist
- Nancy J. Paul, American Air Force officer
- Nancy J. Rosenstengel (born 1968), American district judge
- Nancy J. Tarbell (born 1951), American professor of radiation oncology
- Nancy J. Troy (born 1952), American professor of art
- Nancy Jackson (climber), American climber
- Nancy Jacob, American photographer and artist
- Nancy Jacobs (born 1951), American politician
- Nancy Jacobson (born 1962), American political activist
- Nancy Jane Burton (1891–1972), Scottish artist
- Nancy Jane Dean (1837–1926), American educator and Presbyterian missionary
- Nancy Jay (1929–1991), American sociologist
- Nancy Jeffett (1928–2017), American tennis promoter
- Nancy Jenkins (born 1964), American politician
- Nancy Jennifer (born 1988), Indian actress
- Nancy Jewel McDonie (born 2000), singer in K-Pop band Momoland, performs under the name Nancy
- Nancy Jobson (1880–1964), Australian teacher and headmistress
- Nancy Jo Cullen (born 1962), Canadian poet and fiction writer
- Nancy Jo Hooper, American 1964 Playboy model
- Nancy Jo Powell (born 1947), American diplomat and ambassador
- Nancy Jo Sales (born 1964), American journalist and author
- Nancy Johnson (disambiguation), several people
- Nancy Johnstone (writer) (1906–1951), English writer, hotelier, and humanitarian
- Nancy Jones, several people
- Nancy Juvonen (born 1967), American film producer
- Nancy K. Bereano (born 1942), American editor and publisher
- Nancy K. Miller (born 1941), American literary scholar, feminist theorist, and memoirist
- Nancy K. Nichols (born 1942), British mathematician and numerical analyst
- Nancy K. Pearson (born 1969), American poet
- Nancy K. Stanton (born 1948), American professor emeritus of mathematics
- Nancy Kacungira (born 1986), Ugandan presenter and reporter
- Nancy Kalembe (born 1980), Ugandan businesswoman and politician
- Nancy Kangeryuaq Sevoga (born 1936), Canadian Inuk artist
- Nancy Kanwisher (born 1958), American professor of neuroscience
- Nancy Karetak-Lindell (born 1957), Canadian politician
- Nancy Karigithu, Kenyan politician and activist
- Nancy Kassebaum (1932–2026), American politician
- Nancy Kassop (born 1950), American professor and political scientist
- Nancy Kaszak (born 1950), American attorney and politician
- Nancy Kates, American independent filmmaker
- Nancy J. Katz, American judge
- Nancy Keating, American physician and professor
- Nancy Kedersha (born 1951), American cell biologist and micrographer
- Nancy Keenan (born 1952), American politician
- Nancy Keesing (1923–1993), Australian poet, writer, editor, and promoter of Australian literature
- Nancy Kelley (born 1973), British lawyer, policy adviser, and human rights advocate
- Nancy Kelly (disambiguation), several people
- Nancy Kelsey (1823–1896), American pioneer
- Nancy Kemp-Arendt (born 1969), Luxembourgian politician and athlete
- Nancy Kenaston (1920–2012), British journalist and court reporter
- Nancy Kendrick, American philosopher and professor
- Nancy Kerr (born 1975), English folk musician and songwriter
- Nancy Kerr (curler) (born 1947), Canadian curler
- Nancy Kerrigan (born 1969), American figure skater
- Nancy Khalaf (born 1974), Lebanese swimmer
- Nancy Khedouri, Bahraini politician, businesswoman, and writer
- Nancy Kilgour (1904–1954), Australian painter
- Nancy Killefer (born 1953), American government consultant and political figure
- Nancy Kilpatrick (born 1946), Canadian author
- Nancy Kinder, American founder of Kinder Foundation
- Nancy King, several people
- Nancy Kiprop (born 1979), Kenyan long-distance runner
- Nancy Kirk (geologist) (1916–2005), British geologist
- Nancy Kirk (politician) (born 1942), American politician
- Nancy Kissel, American convicted murderer
- Nancy Kissinger (1934–2026), American philanthropist and socialite
- Nancy Kleckner, American professor of molecular biology
- Nancy Kleniewski, American sociologist and academic administrator
- Nancy Knowlton (born 1949), American coral reef biologist
- Nancy Knudsen (born 1940), Australian TV announcer, actress, businesswoman, and journalist
- Nancy Koehn (born 1959), American author and business historian
- Nancy Koenigsberg (born 1927), American sculptor and painter
- Nancy Kollmann (born 1950), American historian and professor
- Nancy Kominsky (1915–2011), Italian-American artist and television presenter
- Nancy Kopell (born 1942), American mathematician and professor
- Nancy Kopp (born 1943), American politician
- Nancy Kovack (born 1935), American film- and television actress
- Nancy Kozikowski (born 1943), American contemporary artist
- Nancy Krasne, American politician and philanthropist
- Nancy Kress (born 1948), American science fiction writer
- Nancy Kricorian (born 1960), American author and poet
- Nancy Krieger, American epidemiologist and professor
- Nancy Kruse (born 1965), American animator, and film- and television director
- Nancy Kulp (1921–1991), American character actress, writer, and comedian
- Nancy Kurshan (born 1944), American activist
- Nancy Kwai (born 2000), Hong Kong singer and actress
- Nancy Kwallek, American professor emeritus
- Nancy Kwan (born 1939), Hong Kong American actress
- Nancy Kyes (born 1949), American actress
- Nancy L. Crandall (born 1940), American politician
- Nancy L. deClaisse-Walford (born 1954), American theologian, and specialist in the Hebrew language and Biblical studies
- Nancy L. Garcia, Brazilian professor of statistics and mathematics
- Nancy L. Maldonado (born 1975), American lawyer and district judge
- Nancy L. Quarles (born 1952), American politician
- Nancy L. R. Bucher (1913–2017), American physician
- Nancy L. Rosenblum (born 1947), American political scientist and political philosopher
- Nancy L. Ward (born 1955/1956), American Interim Administrator of the FEMA
- Nancy L. Wayne (born 1960), American physiologist, academic administrator, and researcher
- Nancy L. Zimpher (born 1946), American educator, state university leader, and chancellor
- Nancy La Vigne, criminal justice researcher and director
- Nancy Lagomarsino, American poet
- Nancy Laird Chance (born 1931), American pianist and composer
- Nancy Lam (born 1948), Singaporean celebrity chef
- Nancy LaMott (1951–1995), American singer
- Nancy Lancaster (1897–1994), American owner of a British decorating firm
- Nancy Landry (born 1962), American politician
- Nancy Lane, Australian chess player
- Nancy Lane Perham (born 1936), Canadian cell biologist
- Nancy Lang (born 1976), American pop artist, performance artist, entrepreneur, and television personality
- Nancy Langat (born 1981), Kenyan middle-distance runner
- Nancy Lange (born 1954), American investment- and marketing professional living in Peru
- Nancy Langley, American curler
- Nancy Langston, American environmental historian and professor
- Nancy Lanza, American victim of the Sandy Hook Elementary School shooting
- Nancy Lapp (born 1930), American archaeologist and biblical scholar
- Nancy Larraine Hoffmann (born 1947), American politician
- Nancy Larrick (1910–2004), American author, editor and educator
- Nancy Lawton (1950–2007), American artist
- Nancy LeaMond, American lobbyist and AARP person
- Nancy Ledins (1932–2017), American Roman Catholic trans woman priest, psychologist, and electrologist
- Nancy Lee, several people
- Nancy Leftenant-Colon (1920–2025), American nurse
- Nancy Leishman (1894–1983), American heiress
- Nancy Lemann (born 1956), American novelist
- Nancy LeMay (born 1936), American car enthusiast and collector
- Nancy Lenehan (born 1953), American actress
- Nancy Lenkeith (1922–2015), American writer
- Nancy Lenoil, American politician
- Nancy Lerner (born 1960), American investor, philanthropist, and billionaire
- Nancy Lessler, American professional dancer, actress, and mural painter
- Nancy Leveson, American expert in system and software safety
- Nancy Levinson, American editor and writer
- Nancy Lewington, Canadian sprinter
- Nancy Lewis (bodybuilder), American professional bodybuilder
- Nancy Lieberman (born 1958), American WNBA Hall of Fame basketball player, general manager, and coach, Olympic silver medal
- Nancy Lijodi (born 1971), Kenyan volleyball player
- Nancy Lin, American oncologist
- Nancy Linari (born 1955), American voice-, film-, and television actress
- Nancy Lincoln (1784–1818), American mother of Abraham Lincoln
- Nancy Linehan Charles (born 1942), American character actress of film, television, and theater
- Nancy Ling Perry (1947–1974), American founding member of the Symbionese Liberation Army
- Nancy Littlefield (1929–2007), American director and producer of television- and documentary programs
- Nancy Longnecker, New Zealand science communication academic
- Nancy Lonsdorf, American author and medical doctor
- Nancy Loo (born 1964), Hong Kong-born American journalist
- Nancy Lopez (born 1957), American professional golfer
- Nancy Lord (1952–2022), American attorney and medical researcher
- Nancy Loudon (1926–2009), Scottish gynaecologist
- Nancy-Lou Patterson (1929–2018), Canadian artist, writer, and curator
- Nancy Lou Schwartz (1939–1981), American economist and professor
- Nancy Lu, New Zealand national party politician
- Nancy Lubin, American non-fiction writer
- Nancy Lublin (born 1971), American businesswoman
- Nancy Luce (1814–1890), American folk artist and poet
- Nancy Ludington (born 1939), American pair skater
- Nancy Lusk (born 1953), American politician
- Nancy Lyle (1910–1986), English tennis player
- Nancy Lyman Roelker (1915–1993), American historian
- Nancy Lynch (born 1948), American computer scientist
- Nancy Lynn (1956–2006), American entrepreneur, pilot, and public speaker
- Nancy Lyons (born 1930), Australian swimmer
- Nancy M. Amato, American computer scientist
- Nancy M. Dowdy, American nuclear physicist
- Nancy M. Graham (born 1946), American educator, lawyer, and politician
- Nancy M. Petry (1968–2018), American psychologist
- Nancy M. Reichardt, American newspaper columnist
- Nancy MacBeth (born 1948), Canadian politician
- Nancy Mace (born 1977), American politician
- Nancy Mackay (1922–2024), Canadian sprinter
- Nancy MacKenzie (1942–2024), Mexican actress
- Nancy Macko (born 1950), American visual artist
- Nancy MacLean (born 1959), American historian
- Nancy Madden, American psychologist
- Nancy Magdy (born 1995), Egyptian beauty pageant titleholder
- Nancy Mairs (1943–2016), American author
- Nancy Makokha Baraza (born 1957), Kenyan judge
- Nancy Makri (born 1962), Greek professor of chemistry and physics
- Nancy Malloy (1945–1996), Canadian medical administrator and nurse
- Nancy Malone (1935–2014), American television actress
- Nancy Mann, American statistician
- Nancy Mann Waddel Woodrow (c. 1867–1935), American writer
- Nancy Manter (born 1951), American artist and photographer
- Nancy Marchand (1928–2000), American actress
- Nancy Marcus (1950–2018), American biologist and college administrator
- Nancy Maria Winchester, one of Joseph Smith’s wives
- Nancy Marie Mithlo (born 1961), Chiricahua Apache curator, writer, and professor
- Nancy Marion, American professor of economics
- Nancy Marmer, American writer, art critic, and editor
- Nancy Márquez, Chilean politician
- Nancy Marsh (1817–1890), American missionary
- Nancy Martin (born 1973), Canadian curler
- Nancy Martinez (born 1961), Canadian/Hispanic dance-pop singer and musician
- Nancy Massie Meadows (1912–1986), American wife of Clarence W. Meadows
- Nancy Masterton (1930–2015), American farmer, volunteer, and politician
- Nancy Mathiowetz, American sociologist and statistician
- Nancy Maultsby, American operatic mezzo-soprano
- Nancy Maybin Ferguson (1872–1967), American painter
- Nancy Mayer (born 1937), American politician
- Nancy McArthur (1931–2020), American children's author
- Nancy McCampbell Grace (born 1952), American professor of English
- Nancy McCarthy (born 1937), American actress
- Nancy McConnery (born 1963), Canadian curler
- Nancy McCord (?-1974), American soprano and actress
- Nancy McCormick, several people
- Nancy McCredie (1945–2021), Canadian track and field athlete
- Nancy McDaniel (1966–2024), women's golf coach
- Nancy McDonald (1934–2007), American politician
- Nancy McDonnell (born 1955), Canadian gymnast
- Nancy McEldowney (born 1958), American academic and diplomat
- Nancy McFadden (1958/1959-2018), American lawyer
- Nancy McFarlane (born 1956), American pharmacist and politician
- Nancy McGlen, American political scientist, women's studies scholar, and professor emeriti
- Nancy McGovern, American archivist and digital preservation specialist
- Nancy McIntosh (1866–1954), American-born English singer and actress
- Nancy McKenzie (born 1948), American author of historical fiction
- Nancy McKenzie, known as Matooskie (c. 1790–1851), Canadian First Nations woman
- Nancy McKeon (born 1966), American actress
- Nancy McKinstry (born 1959), American businesswoman living in the Netherlands
- Nancy McLain (born 1945), American politician
- Nancy McLeón (born 1971), Cuban track and field athlete
- Nancy McNeil, American 1969 Playboy model
- Nancy McWilliams (born 1945), American psychoanalyst, psychologist, and professor emerita
- Nancy Meckler, American theater- and film director
- Nancy Mee (born 1951), American sculptor and glass artist
- Nancy Meek Pocock (1910–1998), Canadian Quaker feminist and humanitarian
- Nancy Melcher (1916–2015), American lingerie designer
- Nancy Mercado (born 1959), American writer, editor, educator, and activist
- Nancy Mérienne (1793–1860), Swiss painter
- Nancy Merki (1926–2014), American competition swimmer
- Nancy Messonnier (born 1965), American physician
- Nancy Metcalf (born 1978), American volleyball player
- Nancy Meyers (born 1949), American filmmaker
- Nancy Michael, American politician
- Nancy Milford (1938–2022), American biographer
- Nancy Milio (born 1938), American professor emeritus of nursing and health
- Nancy Miller, American TV writer and producer
- Nancy Millis (1922–2012), Australian microbiologist and emeritus professor
- Nancy Minshew, American professor of psychiatry and neurology
- Nancy Miriam Hawley (born 1940s), American activist and feminist
- Nancy Mitchnick (born 1947), American painter and educator
- Nancy Mitford (1904–1973), English novelist and biographer
- Nancy Moffette Lea (1780–1864), American slave owner
- Nancy Montanez Johner, American governmental official
- Nancy Montuori Stein, American film director and producer
- Nancy Moran, American folk-rock singer-songwriter
- Nancy Morejón (born 1944), Cuban poet, critic, and essayist
- Nancy Morgan (born 1949), American actress
- Nancy Morin (1975–2020), Canadian blind goalball player
- Nancy Moritz (born 1960), American circuit judge
- Nancy Morris (born 1961), Canadian Reform rabbi
- Nancy Morrison (1927–2015), American tennis player
- Nancy Morton, Canadian 19th-century key figure of slavery abolition
- Nancy Mounir, Egyptian independent musician, producer, and violin player
- Nancy Mowll Mathews (born 1947), Czech-American art historian, curator, and author
- Nancy Mudge (1929–2012), American AAGPBL player
- Nancy Munn (1931–2020), American anthropologist
- Nancy Munoz (born 1954), American politician
- Nancy Murdoch (born 1969), Scottish curling coach
- Nancy Murphy, American politician
- Nancy Murray (?-2004), Irish Gaelic player
- Nancy Nadel, American politician, businesswoman, and councillor
- Nancy Naeve, American news co-anchor
- Nancy Naigle (born 1962), American author
- Nancy Namrouqa (born 1974), Jordanian politician
- Nancy Nangeroni (born 1953), American diversity educator and transgender community activist
- Nancy Naples, several people
- Nancy Nash, Canadian blues- and pop singer
- Nancy Nash (actress) (1897–?), American actress
- Nancy Nasrallah (born 1983), Lebanese pop singer
- Nancy Nathanson (born 1951), American politician
- Nancy Navalta, Filipino track and field athlete and coach
- Nancy Navarro (born 1965), Venezuelan-American politician and county council member
- Nancy Neiman (born 1933), American cyclist
- Nancy Neudauer, American mathematician
- Nancy Neveloff Dubler, American bioethicist and attorney
- Nancy Neviaser (born 1958), American professional tennis player
- Nancy Nevinson (1918–2012), British actress
- Nancy Newhall (1908–1974), American photography critic
- Nancy Nichols Barker (1925–1994), American professor of history
- Nancy Nicholson (1899–1977), English painter and fabric designer
- Nancy Nielsen, American 1961 Playboy model
- Nancy Nigrosh, American media executive, talent agent, and literary editor
- Nancy Njau, Kenyan accountant and corporate executive
- Nancy Njie (born 1965), Gambian politician
- Nancy Noel (1945–2020), American artist
- Nancy Nolan (1936–2020), American school administrator and Roman Catholic nun
- Nancy Nord, American politician
- Nancy Norman (1925–2024), American singer
- Nancy North, American fashion designer
- Nancy Northcroft (1913–1980), New Zealand architect and town planner
- Nancy Northup (born 1960), American political activist
- Nancy Norton, multiple people
- Nancy Nova, English disco singer and songwriter
- Nancy November, New Zealand academic and professor of musicology
- Nancy Novotny, American radio personality, voice actress, and script writer
- Nancy Nugent Title, American sound editor
- Nancy Nyongesa (born 1987), Kenyan volleyball player
- Nancy Oakes, American chef
- Nancy Obregón (born 1970), Peruvian politician
- Nancy Obuchowski (born 1962), American biostatistician
- Nancy O'Dell (born 1966), American television host and entertainment journalist
- Nancy O'Driscoll, Irish camogie player
- Nancy O'Malley, American lawyer and politician
- Nancy O'Meara (born 1969), American dancer, choreographer, and actress
- Nancy O'Neil (1907–1995), Australian-born British actress
- Nancy O'Rahilly (1878–1961), American-born Irish nationalist
- Nancy Oestreich Lurie (1924–2017), American anthropologist
- Nancy Okail, Egyptian activist and scholar
- Nancy Olewiler (born 1948), Canadian economist and professor
- Nancy Oliver (born 1955), American playwright and screenwriter
- Nancy Olivieri (born 1954), Canadian haematologist and researcher
- Nancy Olmsted (born 1966), Canadian kayaker
- Nancy Olson (tennis) (born 1957), American wheelchair tennis player
- Nancy Olson (born 1928), American actress
- Nancy Onyango (born 1964), Kenyan accountant, businesswoman, and corporate executive
- Nancy Opel (born 1956), American singer and actress
- Nancy Ordway (1914–2005), American radio actress
- Nancy Ornstein (born 1952), American professional tennis player
- Nancy Ortberg, American spouse of John Ortberg
- Nancy Osbaldeston (born 1989), English ballet dancer
- Nancy Oshana Wehbe (born 1975), Assyrian-American professional bodybuilder
- Nancy Ostrander (1925–2024), American diplomat
- Nancy Overton (1926–2009), American pop singer and songwriter
- Nancy Owen (born 1943), American volleyball player
- Nancy P. Dorn (born 1958), American politician
- Nancy Padian (born 1952), American medical researcher and physician
- Nancy Palk (born 1956), Canadian actress
- Nancy Palm, American politician
- Nancy Papalopulu (born 1962), Greek neuroscientist and professor
- Nancy Parbury (1885–1959), Australian amateur golfer
- Nancy Parrish (born 1948), American politician and judge
- Nancy Parsons (1942–2001), American actress
- Nancy Paterson, multiple people
- Nancy Pearce Helmbold (1918–2007), American Latinist
- Nancy Pearcey (born 1952), American evangelical Christian author
- Nancy Pearl (born 1945), American librarian, best-selling author, and literary critic
- Nancy Pearlman (born 1948), American broadcaster, environmentalist, college instructor, and TV producer
- Nancy Pearson, American curler
- Nancy Pedersen, American genetic epidemiologist
- Nancy Pelosi (born 1940), American 52nd Speaker of the United States House of Representatives
- Nancy Peña (handballer) (born 1982), Dominican team handball player
- Nancy Peña (comics writer) (born 1979), French bande dessinée author and children's literature illustrator
- Nancy Peoples Guthrie (born 1952), American politician
- Nancy Perriam (1769–1865), English Royal Navy soldier and fish seller
- Nancy Peters (born 1936), American publisher, writer, and bookstore owner
- Nancy Petry (artist) (1931–2024), Canadian artist
- Nancy M. Petry (1968–2018), American psychologist
- Nancy Petyarre (1930s–2009), Australian Aboriginal artist
- Nancy Pfister (1956–2014), American murder victim
- Nancy Pfotenhauer (born 1963), American economist
- Nancy Phelan (1913–2008), Australian writer
- Nancy Phyllis Louise Astor (1909–1975), Countess of Ancaster
- Nancy Pickard (born 1945), American crime novelist
- Nancy Pimental (born 1965), American actress and film- and television writer
- Nancy Pinkerton (1940–2010), American actress
- Nancy Pinkin (born 1952), American politician
- Nancy Pinzón (born 1974), Mexican footballer
- Nancy Plummer Faxon (1914–2005), American soprano, music educator, and composer
- Nancy Polette, American writer and teacher
- Nancy Polikoff (born 1952), American law professor, LGBT rights activist, and author
- Nancy Pollard, American computer scientist, roboticist, computer graphics researcher, and professor
- Nancy Ponzi (born 1941), American teacher, vintner, and community leader
- Nancy Potischman (born 1955), American nutritional epidemiologist
- Nancy Potok, American government official
- Nancy Prasad (born 1960), Indo-Fijian who moved to Australia
- Nancy Price (1880–1970), English actress, author, and theater director
- Nancy Prichard (1916–2006), American scientist and computer expert
- Nancy Priddy (born 1941), American actress, singer, and singer-songwriter
- Nancy Princenthal (born 1955), American art historian, writer, and author
- Nancy Proskauer Dryfoos (1918–1991), American sculptor
- Nancy Pukingrnak Aupaluktuq (born 1940), Canadian Inuk artist
- Nancy Purves (born 1949), American sprint canoer
- Nancy Pyle (1937/1938-2023), American educator and politician
- Nancy Qian, Chinese American economist
- Nancy Quinn (1919–2014), American public figure of Hawaii
- Nancy R. Heinen, American corporate lawyer, business executive, and philanthropist
- Nancy R. Mead (born 1942), American computer scientist
- Nancy R. Stocksdale (born 1934), American politician
- Nancy Raabe (born 1954), American clergy member, author, and composer
- Nancy Rabalais, American marine ecologist
- Nancye Radmin (1938–2020), American businesswoman
- Nancy Raffa, American ballet master
- Nancy Ramey (1940–2022), American competition swimmer
- Nancy Rappaport, American board-certified child- and adolescent psychiatrist
- Nancy Rasmussen (born 1953), American politician
- Nancy Raven (1872–1957), Native American last known speaker of the Natchez language
- Nancy Rawles, American playwright, novelist, and teacher
- Nancy Reagan (1921–2016), American film actress and former First Lady of the United States
- Nancy Redd (born 1981), American author and beauty pageant winner
- Nancy Reddin Kienholz (1943–2019), American mixed media artist
- Nancy Regan (born 1966), Canadian actress, journalist, news anchor, and television personality
- Nancy Reid (born 1952), Canadian theoretical statistician
- Nancy Reiner (1942–2006), American artist
- Nancy Reisman (born 1961), American author
- Nancy Reno (born 1965), American beach volleyball player
- Nancy Rexroth (born 1946), American photographer
- Nancy Reynolds, American dance director of research, and ballerina
- Nancy Riach (1927–1947), Scottish swimmer
- Nancy Riche, several people
- Nancy Richey (born 1942), American tennis player
- Nancy Richler (1957–2018), Canadian novelist
- Nancy Riley (born 1958), American politician
- Nancy Rios (born 1988), American windsurfer
- Nancy Roberts, several people
- Nancy Robertson, several people
- Nancy Rodrigues (born 1952), American politician
- Nancy Rodriguez, multiple people
- Nancy Rohrman (born 1971), American soccer player
- Nancy Roman (1925–2018), American astronomer
- Nancy Romero-Daza, American medical anthropologist and associate professor
- Nancy Rommelmann, American journalist, book reviewer, and author
- Nancy Roos (1905–1957), American chess champion
- Nancy Roper (1918–2004), British nurse theorist and lexicographer
- Nancy Rose, American economist and professor
- Nancy Rosen, American sculptor and independent curator
- Nancy Ross, several people
- Nancy Rothbard, American deputy dean and professor
- Nancy Rothwell (born 1955), British physiologist
- Nancy Rourke (born 1957), American deaf artist and advocate
- Nancy Rubin, American human rights advocate and ambassador
- Nancy Rubins (born 1952), American sculptor and installation artist
- Nancy Rue (born 1951), American Christian novelist
- Nancy Rumbel, American musician
- Nancy Russell (speech teacher) (1909–1993), New Zealand speech teacher, journalist, drama critic, and producer
- Nancy Neighbor Russell, American conservationist
- Nancy Russo (born 1943), American psychologist
- Nancy Rust (1928–2018), American politician
- Nancy "Rusty" Barceló (born 1946), American university staff
- Nancy Ruth (born 1942), Canadian heiress, activist, philanthropist, and politician
- Nancy Ryles (1937–1990), American politician
- Nancy S. Jecker (born 1960), American bioethicist, philosopher, and author
- Nancy S. Lacore, American Naval officer
- Nancy S. Steinhardt (born 1954), American architectural historian
- Nancy Saitta, American attorney and jurist
- Nancy Salas (1910–1990), Australian music teacher and musicologist
- Nancy Sales Cash (born 1940), American novelist, journalist, and television producer
- Nancy Salisbury (1930–2004), American Roman Catholic religious sister, educator, and academic
- Nancy Salmon (1906–1999), British senior air force officer
- Nancy Salzman (born 1954), American felon and co-founder of NXIVM
- Nancy Sand (born 1964), Argentine teacher and politician
- Nancy Sandars (1914–2015), British archaeologist and prehistorian
- Nancy Sanford Hughes (born 1943), American founder and president of StoveTeam International
- Nancy Saunders (1925–2020), American film-, television-, and stage actress
- Nancy Savoca (born 1959), American film director, producer, and screenwriter
- Nancy Sawin (1917–2008), American artist, local historian, educator, and field hockey player
- Nancy Saxton, American council member
- Nancy Schaefer (1936–2010), American politician
- Nancy Scheper-Hughes (born 1944), American anthropologist, educator, and author
- Nancy Schön (born 1928), American sculptor
- Nancy Schoonmaker (1873–1965), American writer, politician, suffragist, and women's rights advocate
- Nancy Schreiber (born 1949), American cinematographer
- Nancy Schwartzman, American documentary filmmaker, producer, and media strategist
- Nancy Schweitzer, American wife of farmer and politician Brian Schweitzer
- Nancy Scott (1931–2005), American theater/film critic
- Nancy Scott (model), American 1964 Playboy model
- Nancy Scranton (born 1961), American professional golfer
- Nancy Seaman (born 1952), American teacher and convicted murderer
- Nancy Seear, Baroness Seear (1913–1997), British social scientist and politician
- Nancy Segal (born 1951), American evolutionary psychologist and behavioral geneticist
- Nancy Selvin (born 1943), American sculptor
- Nancy Kangeryuaq Sevoga (born 1936), Inuk artist
- Nancy Sexton (born 1969), American filmmaker, singer-songwriter, model, and TV personality
- Nancy Shade (born 1946), American spinto soprano and actress
- Nancy Shanks (c. 1956–2019), American singer
- Nancy Shaver (born 1946), American visual artist
- Nancy Shelley (1926–2010), Australian Quaker peace activist
- Nancy Shepherd (born 1954), American politician
- Nancy Sheppard (1929–2026), American trick rider and trick roper
- Nancy Sherman (born 1951), American professor of philosophy
- Nancy Sheung (1914–1979), Hong Kong photographer
- Nancy Shevell (born 1959), American wife of English musician Paul McCartney
- Nancy Shields Kollmann (born 1950), American historian
- Nancy Shukri (born 1961), Malaysian politician
- Nancy Sihlwayi, South African politician
- Nancy Sikobe (born 1970), Kenyan volleyball player
- Nancy Silverton (born 1954), American chef, baker, and author
- Nancy Silvestrini (1972–2003), Argentine climber
- Nancy Simmons (born 1959), American zoologist, mammalogist, professor, and author
- Nancy Simons (born 1938), American competition swimmer
- Nancy Sinatra (born 1940), American singer and actress
- Nancy Siraisi (1932–2026), American historian of medicine and academic
- Nancy Sit (born 1950), Hong Kong actress
- Nancy Sivak, Canadian actress
- Nancy Skinner, several people
- Nancy Skolos (born 1955), American graphic designer, author, educator, and academic
- Nancy Sleeth, American environmentalist
- Nancy Smith, several people
- Nancy Smyth, Canadian career foreign affairs professional, and ambassador to Ireland
- Nancy Snow, several people
- Nancy Snyder (born 1949), American actress
- Nancy Snyderman (born 1952), American physician, author, and broadcast journalist
- Nancy Soderberg (born 1958), American foreign policy strategist
- Nancy Sorel (born 1964), Canadian-American actress
- Nancy Sorkin Rabinowitz, American classical scholar
- Nancy Sorrell (born 1974), English model, actress, and television presenter
- Nancy Sottos, American materials scientist and professor of engineering
- Nancy Southern, Canadian businesswoman and chief executive
- Nancy Southworth, American slalom canoeist
- Nancy Spain (1917–1964), English broadcaster and journalist
- Nancy Spanier (born 1942), American dancer, choreographer, artistic director, filmmaker, and educator
- Nancy Speck, American hematologist and academic
- Nancy Spector (born 1959), American museum curator
- Nancy Speir (born 1958), American sculptor, painter, and graphic artist
- Nancy Spence (born 1936), American politician
- Nancy Spender (1909–2001), British painter
- Nancy Spero (1926–2009), American visual artist
- Nancy Spielberg (born 1956), American film producer
- Nancy Springer (born 1948), American fiction author
- Nancy Spruill, American statistician and defense acquisitions analyst
- Nancy Spungen (1958–1978), American ex-girlfriend of Sid Vicious and murder victim
- Nancy Stafford (born 1954), American actress, speaker, and author
- Nancy Stahl, American illustrator, graphic designer, and stamp designer
- Nancy Staudt (born 1963), American lawyer, legal scholar, and dean
- Nancy Steele (1923–2001), Sierra Leonean politician and labor activist
- Nancy Steen (born 1950), American television producer, writer, and actress
- Nancy Steiner, American costume designer
- Nancy Stepan, Scottish-American science historian
- Nancy Stephens (born 1949), American actress
- Nancy Stetson, American ambassador
- Nancy Stevens, American field hockey coach
- Nancy Stevenson (1928–2001), American politician
- Nancy Stewart Parnell (1901–1975), British politician and trade unionist
- Nancy Stiles, American politician
- Nancy Stockall, American professor of early childhood studies and special education
- Nancy Stohlman (born 1973), American flash fiction writer and musician
- Nancy Stokey (born 1950), American professor of economics
- Nancy Storace (1765–1817), English operatic soprano
- Nancy Storrs (1950–2023), American rower
- Nancy Stouffer, American author accused of copyright infringement
- Nancy Stoyer, American chemist
- Nancy Stratford (born 1919), American aviator
- Nancy Struever (born 1928), American historian
- Nancy Stuart, several people
- Nancy Sullivan (disambiguation), several people
- Nancy Sumari (born 1986), Tanzanian author, businesswoman, and social entrepreneur
- Nancy Sumner (1839–1895), Hawaiian chiefess
- Nancy Sununu (1939–2024), American political matriarch
- Nancy Sutley (born 1962), American politician
- Nancy Sweetnam (born 1973), Canadian competition swimmer
- Nancy Sweezy (1921–2010), American artist, author, folklorist, advocate, scholar, and preservationist
- Nancy Swider-Peltz (born 1956), American Olympic speed skater and coach
- Nancy Swider-Peltz Jr. (born 1987), American speed skater
- Nancy T. Chang, biochemist
- Nancy Taira (born 1977), Mexican actress
- Nancy Tait (1920–2009), English health- and safety activist and campaigner
- Nancy Talbot (1920–2009), American businesswoman
- Nancy Taman (born 1994), Egyptian artistic gymnast
- Nancy Tang, several people
- Nancy Tappan, American non-fiction writer, survivalist, magazine editor, and columnist
- Nancy Tate, American politician
- Nancy Taylor Rosenberg (1946–2017), American writer
- Nancy Tchaylian (born 1991), Lebanese football- and futsal player
- Nancy Teed (1949–1993), Canadian politician
- Nancy Teeters (1930–2014), American economist and corporate executive
- Nancy Telfer (born 1950), Canadian choral conductor, music educator, and composer
- Nancy Tellem (born 1952), American entertainment executive
- Nancy Tembo (born 1959), Malawian politician
- Nancy Temkin, American statistician and professor of brain surgery and biostatistics
- Nancy Temple, American attorney
- Nancy Thayer (born 1943), American novelist
- Nancy Thies (born 1957), American gymnast
- Nancy Theriault, American politician
- Nancy Thomas (1918–2015), British television producer
- Nancy Thompson, several people
- Nancy Thomson de Grummond (born 1940), American professor, linguist, historian, writer, and archaeologist
- Nancy Thornberry, American chemist and chief executive
- Nancy Thorndike Greenspan, American author and health economist
- Nancy Tichborne (1942–2023), New Zealand watercolor artist
- Nancy Tillman (born 1954), American author and illustrator of children's books
- Nancy Tilly (born 1935), American children's author
- Nancy Tinari (born 1959), Canadian long-distance runner
- Nancy Titterton (1903–1936), American murder victim
- Nancy Todd (born 1948), American politician
- Nancy Tomes, American historian, author, and professor
- Nancy Torresen (born 1959), American district judge
- Nancy Tousley (born 1943), American senior art critic, journalist, art writer, and independent curator
- Nancy Travis (born 1961), American actress
- Nancy Tribble Benda (1930–2015), American actress, educator, and a pioneer of early educational television
- Nancy Tsiboe (1923–?), Ghanaian publisher and activist
- Nancy Tuana (born 1951), American philosopher, ethicist, and professor
- Nancy Tuchman (born 1958), American environmental scientist, educator, and activist
- Nancy Tuckerman (1928–2018), American Kennedy administration personnel
- Nancy Turbak Berry (born 1956), American politician
- Nancy Turner (born 1947), Canadian ethnobiologist
- Nancy Twine, American chief executive
- Nancy Tyson Burbidge (1912–1977), Australian systemic botanist, conservationist, and herbarium curator
- Nancy Underhill (born 1938), American art historian, curator, lecturer, and author
- Nancy Updike, American public radio producer and writer
- Nancy Uranga (1954–1976), Cuban fencer
- Nancy Usero, Spanish rhythmic gymnast
- Nancy Utley, American film producer and studio executive
- Nancy V. Rawls (1926–1985), American diplomat
- Nancy Valen (born 1965), American actress and television producer
- Nancy Valentine (1928–2017), American actress
- Nancy Valentine (mayor), American politician
- Nancy Vallecilla (born 1957), Ecuadorian athlete
- Nancy Valverde (1932–2024), American Chicana lesbian icon
- Nancy VanderMeer (born 1958), American businesswoman and politician
- Nancy Van de Vate (1930–2023), American-born Austrian composer, violist, and pianist
- Nancy van der Burg (born 1992), Dutch racing cyclist
- Nancy van Overveldt (1930–2015), Dutch-Mexican artist
- Nancy Varian Berberick (born 1951), American fantasy author
- Nancy Vaughan (born 1961), American mayor
- Nancy Vickers, multiple people
- Nancy Vieira (born 1975), Guinea-Bissau-born Cape Verdean singer who lives in Portugal
- Nancy Vieira Couto (born 1942), American poet
- Nancy Vincent McClelland (1877–1959), American interior designer
- Nancy Virtue Lewis (1949–2014), American politician
- Nancy Vonderheide (c. 1939–2017), American archer
- Nancy Voorhees (1906–1988), American high jumper
- Nancy Wagner, American politician from Delaware
- Nancy Wake (1912–2011), New Zealand-born Australian nurse, journalist, and intelligence officer
- Nancy Walker (1922–1992), American actress, comedian, and director
- Nancy Walker Bush Ellis (1926–2021), American environmentalist
- Nancy Wallace, multiple people
- Nancy Walters (1933–2009), American model, actress, and minister
- Nancy Walton Laurie (born 1951), American billionaire, as an heir to the Walmart fortune
- Nancy Wambui (born 1986), Kenyan long-distance runner
- Nancy Wang, American cloud technology executive and philanthropist
- Nancy Wang Yuen (born 1976/1977), American sociologist
- Nancy Waples (born 1960), American lawyer and judge
- Nancy Ward (c. 1738-c. 1823), American Cherokee political leader
- Nancy Warren, several people
- Nancy Waswa (born 1971), Kenyan volleyball player
- Nancy Weaver Teichert, American journalist
- Nancy Weber (born 1942), American writer
- Nancy Wechsler, American activist, politician, and writer
- Nancy Weir (1915–2008), Australian pianist and teacher
- Nancy Weiss Malkiel (born 1944), American historian
- Nancy Welford (1904–1991), British-born American actress
- Nancy Werlin (born 1961), American writer of young-adult novels
- Nancy Wexler (born 1945), American geneticist and professor of neuropsychology
- Nancy Whang, American member of rock band LCD Soundsystem
- Nancy Whiskey (1935–2003), Scottish folk singer
- Nancy White, several people
- Nancy Whittier (born 1966), American sociologist and professor
- Nancy Wicker, American professor and art historian
- Nancy Wickwire (1925–1974), American stage- and television actress
- Nancy Wiener, American antiquities dealer
- Nancy Wijekoon, Sri Lankan poet and activist
- Nancy Wilkie (1942–2021), American archaeologist
- Nancy Willard (1936–2017), American novelist, poet, author, and illustrator of children's books
- Nancy Williams (born 1959), New Zealand cricketer
- Nancy Williams Watt (born 1948), American writer
- Nancy Wilson, several people
- Nancy Winstel (born 1953), American women's college basketball coach
- Nancy Wohlforth, American union leader and activist
- Nancy Woloch (born 1940), American historian
- Nancy Wood, several people
- Nancy Worden (1954–2021), American artist and metalsmith
- Nancy Workman (1940–2020), American politician
- Nancy Worley (1951–2021), American politician
- Nancy Worman (born 1963), American professor and classical scholar
- Nancy Wright (1917–1994), Welsh amateur golfer
- Nancy Wright Beasley (born 1945), American author
- Nancy Wu (born 1981), Hong Kong actress
- Nancy Wyman (1946–2026), American politician
- Nancy Wynne-Jones (1922–2006), Welsh-born Irish artist
- Nancy Wyse Power (1889–1963), Irish celticist, diplomat, and nationalist
- Nancy Xu (born 1991), Chinese dancer and choreographer
- Nancy Y. Bekavac, American higher education consultant
- Nancy Y. Lee, Taiwanese-born American physician
- Nancy Yao, American museum administrator
- Nancy Yasecko, American media artist and educator
- Nancy Yeargin (born 1955), American tennis player
- Nancy Yeide, American art curator
- Nancy Yi Fan (born 1993), Chinese-American author
- Nancy York (born 1947), American politician
- Nancy Yoshihara, American journalist
- Nancy Youdelman (born 1948), American mixed media sculptor
- Nancy Youngblut (born 1953), American actress
- Nancy Young Wright, American politician
- Nancy Youssef, American journalist and chief correspondent
- Nancy Yuen, several people
- Nancy Yuille (1902–1994), Irish second wife of Richard Wyndham-Quin, 6th Earl of Dunraven and Mount-Earl
- Nancy Zafris, American novelist and short story writer
- Nancy Zahniser (1948–2016), American pharmacologist
- Nancy Zeelenberg (1903–1986), Dutch lawyer and politician
- Nancy Zeltsman (born 1958), American international marimba soloist and professor
- Nancy Zhou (born 1993), Chinese-American classical violinist
- Nancy Zieman (1953–2017), American author and designer
- Nancy Zimmerman (born 1963/1964), American hedge fund manager

=== Fictional characters ===
- Nancy, from Oliver Twist
- Nancy, the main protagonist in Fancy Nancy
- Nancy Adams (Smallville), in the American TV series Smallville
- Nancy Blackett, from Swallows and Amazons series of books by Arthur Ransome
- Nancy Bliss, in the soap opera Neighbours, played by Joy Westmore
- Nancy Botwin, the female lead on the TV series Weeds
- Nancy Brewster, in the Australian TV soap opera Neighbours, played by Marilyn Maguire
- Nancy Callahan, from Sin City
- Nancy Carter, in the BBC soap opera EastEnders, played by Maddy Hill
- Nancy Costello, in the American drama TV series Your Honor, played by Amy Landecker
- Nancy (comic strip), created by Ernie Bushmiller
- Nancy Drew, the heroine detective of the mystery series of the same name
- Nancy Fowler Archer, in the 1958 film Attack of the 50 Foot Woman
- Nancy Grant, from the American soap opera All My Children
- Nancy Gribble, from King of the Hill, wife of Dale Gribble
- Nancy Hayton, in Channel 4 soap opera Hollyoaks
- Nancy Hughes, from the CBS Daytime soap opera As the World Turns, played by Helen Wagner
- Nancy Karr, from the American soap opera The Edge of Night, played by Ann Flood
- Nancy Kramer, in the teen drama Degrassi Junior High & Degrassi High, played by Arlene Lott
- Nancy Krieger Weston, in the American drama TV series Thirtysomething, played by Patricia Wettig
- Nancy Lawson, in the American soap opera Another Life, played by Nancy Mulvey
- Nancy Leathers, in the ITV soap opera Coronation Street, the grandmother of Ken Barlow and the mother of Ida Barlow
- NANCY-MI847J, from the fighting video game Tekken 6
- Nancy Thompson, the heroine from two of the A Nightmare on Elm Street films
- Nancy Tinker, from the British soap opera Coronation Street, played by Kate Fitzgerald
- Nancy Weeks, in the British comedy-drama TV series Moving Wallpaper, played by Raquel Cassidy
- Nancy Wesley, from the soap opera Days of Our Lives, played by Patrika Darbo
- Nancy Wheeler, from Stranger Things
- Nancy Woods, in Archie Comics
