= Riche (surname) =

Riche is a surname. Notable people with the surname include:

- Claude Riche (1762–1797), French naturalist
- Edward Riche (born 1961), Canadian writer
- Le Riche, Italian drag queen
- Martha Farnsworth Riche (born 1939), American census director
- Nancy Riche (disambiguation), multiple people
- Nathalie Henry Riche, French-American information visualization researcher
