= Nancy Kelly (disambiguation) =

Nancy Kelly may refer to:

- Nancy Kelly (1921–1995), American actress
- Nancy Kelly (jazz singer) (born 1950), American jazz singer
- Nancy Kelly, a homeopath, founder of Homeopaths Without Borders

== See also ==
- Nancy Kelley (born 1973), British lawyer, policy adviser, and human rights advocate
