= Priscilla K. Coleman =

American psychologist and researcher

Priscilla Kari Coleman
- Education: Southern Connecticut State University, James Madison University, West Virginia University
- Known for: Research regarding the proposed link between abortion and mental health problems
- Scientific career
- Fields: Developmental psychology
- Workplaces: Bowling Green State University
- Thesis: Maternal self-efficacy beliefs as predictors of parenting competence and toddlers' emotional, social, and cognitive development (1998)
- Doctoral advisor: Katherine H. Karraker

Priscilla K. Coleman is a retired Professor of Human Development and Family Studies in the School of Family and Consumer Sciences at Bowling Green State University, Ohio. She is the author (or co-author) of a number of disputed academic papers, which claim to have found a statistical correlation or causal relationship between abortion and mental health problems.

Her research has mostly met with a poor reception from her professional colleagues, and at least one of her manuscripts (originally published in Frontiers in Psychology) was retracted from the scientific literature due to not meeting the standards of the journal. In a separate case, researchers were unable to reproduce Coleman's results on abortion and mental health despite using the same dataset, and have described her findings as "logically inconsistent" and potentially "substantially inflated" by faulty methodology. The American Psychological Association (APA) and other major medical bodies have concluded that the evidence does not support a link between abortion and mental health problems, and an APA panel charged with reviewing the evidence were similarly critical of the methodology of Coleman's studies. Coleman has responded that she is not the only qualified scientist whose research suggests that abortion may have serious mental health risks for many women.

== Biography and publications ==
Coleman graduated from Southern Connecticut State University in 1988 with a B.A. in Psychology. She obtained a M.A. in General Psychology from James Madison University in 1992, and a Ph.D. in Life-Span Developmental Psychology from West Virginia University in 1998. She is the founder and director of the World Expert Consortium for Abortion Research and Education (WECARE), which has been described by a pro-choice educational foundation as an "anti-choice misinformation group".

Coleman's three most cited papers, co-authored with Katherine Hildebrandt Karraker, concern parental self-efficacy and its consequences. She has also published a series of articles reporting a correlation between induced abortion and mental-health problems, findings which have proven controversial.

In 2011, Coleman published a meta-analysis of 22 studies, half of which were her own, in the British Journal of Psychiatry. In this paper, she claimed to have found that women who had undergone an abortion "experienced an 81% increased risk of mental health problems, and nearly 10% of the incidence of mental health problems was shown to be directly attributable to abortion". The Royal College of Obstetricians and Gynaecologists noted that Coleman's results conflict with those of four previous literature reviews, all of which found that women who have abortions did not face an increased risk of mental health problems. The College suggested that Coleman's results were due to her failure to control for pre-existing mental-health problems, which tend to be more prevalent in women having abortions. This meta-analysis was also criticized by Julia Steinberg and a number of other researchers, who wrote in 2012 that it contained seven significant errors, as well as three shortcomings of the included studies. Steinberg et al. concluded that these errors and shortcomings "render the meta-analysis' conclusions invalid."

=== Reception and reaction ===
The statistical methods Coleman and her co-authors use have been criticized by the American Psychological Association (APA). An APA panel found that studies by Coleman and her co-authors have "inadequate or inappropriate" controls and don't adequately consider "women's mental health prior to the pregnancy and abortion." Coleman defended her methodology, arguing that it is consistent with recommendations in the Handbook of Research Synthesis and Meta-Analysis.

Coleman and her coauthors have also been criticized by other researchers in the field over the meaning and reproducibility of their data. Psychologist Brenda Major criticized one of Coleman's studies, saying that it did not distinguish correlation and cause; that the direction of causality could be reversed, with psychiatric problems leading to a greater incidence of abortion; and that the study failed to control for factors such as relationship stability and education. Jillian Henderson, a professor of gynecology, and Katharine Miller wrote to the Journal of Anxiety Disorders, saying, "We believe that Cougle, et al., operate with strong political views regarding abortion, and unfortunately their biases appear to have resulted in serious methodological flaws in the analysis published in your journal. [Reardon, Coleman and Cougle] are involved in building a literature to be used in efforts to restrict access to abortion." Nancy Russo, a psychology professor and abortion researcher, examined two of Coleman's articles and found that when the methodological flaws in the studies were corrected, the supposed correlation between abortion and poor mental health disappeared.

Other researchers were unable to reproduce Coleman's analysis of the National Comorbidity Survey, which she had used to support an association between abortion and depression or substance abuse. Coleman and her colleagues, according to one review, failed to control for pre-existing mental health problems and for other risk factors for mental health problems, such as sexual or physical violence. Julia Steinberg, one of the researchers attempting to verify Coleman's findings, said: "We were unable to reproduce the most basic tabulations of Coleman and colleagues... Moreover, their findings were logically inconsistent with other published research—for example, they found higher rates of depression in the last month than other studies found during respondents' entire lifetimes. This suggests that the results were substantially inflated."

Coleman initially responded that her analysis had used different methods and examined long-term psychological problems. Subsequently, she and her coauthors issued a correction to their paper, stating that they had made an error in weighting the study variables. After correcting their error, the association between abortion and some mental-health problems weakened or disappeared, but the authors concluded that "fortunately, the overall pattern of the results has not changed very much". Separately, the journal editor and the principal investigator of the NCS (from which Coleman had drawn her data) opined that, in light of the concerns raised, Coleman et al.'s analysis "does not support their assertions that abortions led to psychopathology." Despite the correction, further concerns about the accuracy of Coleman's analysis were raised; Coleman responded to these criticisms and pointed to other work she had published.

== Court witness ==
In an August 2022 Michigan court case challenging a 1931 abortion ban, Coleman was hired by abortion opponents to provide testimony. The judge in the case, Jacob James Cunningham, stated: "Dr Coleman's testimony is dismissed as not credible, in a practical sense, completely called into question during cross-examination, nor helpful in assisting the court in defeating the plaintiff's request for a preliminary injunction. The court affords testimony no weight," and also stated: "Specifically, testimony established that 22 studies were aggregated in the metadata study. Of those 22, 11 were authored by the witness and only 14 data sets were used. Presumably, the testimony revealed 11 of them created by the witness herself."
