= Nancy Adams (disambiguation) =

Nancy Adams (1926–2007) was a New Zealand botanist.

Nancy Adams may also refer to:

- Nancy Adams Collins (born 1947), née Nancy Adams, of the Mississippi State Senate
- Nancy Adams (singer), singer of the 1973 Disney song, "Love"

== Fictional characters ==
- Nancy Adams (Ace of Aces), character in Ace of Aces
- Nancy Adams (Smallville), character in Smallville

== See also ==
- Nancy Adam (1888–1982), Scottish trade union officer
