= Nancy Jones =

Nancy Jones may refer to:

- Nancy Jones (missionary) (1860–1939), African-American missionary in Africa
- Nancy "Mama" Jones, mother of rapper Jim Jones and cast member on Love & Hip Hop: New York and Chrissy & Mr. Jones
- Nancy Jones (medical examiner), Cook County Medical Examiner, Illinois, US, 2007–2012
- Nancy Jones, former television producer on Wheel of Fortune
- Nancy Lane (née Jones) (born 1971), Australian chess player

== See also ==
- Nancy Jones House, a historic home near Cary, Wake County, North Carolina, US
- Nancy Wynne-Jones (1922–2006), Welsh and Irish artist
