= Nancy Wallace =

Nancy Wallace may refer to:

- Nancy Wallace (environmentalist) (1930-2024), American environmentalist
- Nancy Elizabeth Wallace, American children's book author
- Nancy G. Wallace (born 1968), American politician
- Nancy Pearson (née Wallace), American curler
