= Nancy Henry =

Nancy Henry may refer to:

- Nancy A. Henry (born 1961), American poet
- Nancy Henry (professor) (born 1965), American professor
