= Nancy Vickers =

Nancy Vickers may refer to:

- Nancy J. Vickers (born 1945), American academic administrator
- Nancy Vickers, Canadian novelist and poet
