= Nancy Worman =

American classical scholar

Nancy Worman (born 1963) is Professor of Classics at Barnard and Columbia University. She is an expert on ancient Greek drama and oratory, on ancient literary criticism and literary theory, and on the reception of ancient Greece in the post-classical world.

== Career ==
Worman was educated at Barnard College, where she received her BA; she later received her PhD from Princeton University, in 1994. Between 1994 and 1996 she taught at Rutgers and Yale. She is currently Professor of Classics and Comparative Literature at Barnard College, where she has taught since 1996. She has also held a visiting associate professorship at Harvard University (2007-2008), and a visiting professorship at Cornell University (2012). She was awarded an Ann Whitney Olin Professorship in 2016.

Worman's research interests include style and the body in performance in classical Greek drama and its reception, as well as rhetoric and ancient and modern literary theory. Her work on landscape in her co-edited volume Space, Place and Landscape in Ancient Greek Literature and Culture (2014) was funded by a Loeb Fellowship and a Mellon-SIRT grant. She has also worked on feminist receptions of ancient Greece, with her 2018 work Virginia Woolf’s Greek Tragedy. Classical Receptions in Twentieth-Century Writing described as "excellent... nuanced [and] radical." In 2022 her monograph Tragic Bodies: Edges of the Human in Greek Drama won the PROSE Award for Classics.

== Selected publications ==
- Landscape and the Spaces of Metaphor in Ancient Literary Theory and Criticism. Cambridge University Press (2015).
- Place, Space, and Landscape in Ancient Greek Literature and Culture, ed.K. Gilhuly and N. Worman. Cambridge University Press (2014).
- Abusive Mouths in Classical Athens. Cambridge University Press (2008).
- The Cast of Character: Style in Greek Literature. University of Texas Press (2002).
- "Euripides, Aristophanes, and Sophistic Style." In The Blackwell Companion to Euripides, ed. L. McClure (Blackwell, 2017), 517–32.
- "What Is 'Greek Sex' For?" In Ancient Sex: New Essays, ed. R. Blondell and K. Ormand (Ohio State University Press, 2015), 208–30.
- "The Aesthetics of Ancient Landscapes." In A Companion to Ancient Aesthetics, Blackwell Companions to the Ancient World, ed. P. Destrée and P. Murray (Blackwell, 2015), 291–306.
