= Nancy Davidson =

Nancy Davidson may refer to:

- Nancy Davidson (artist) (born 1943), American artist
- Nancy E. Davidson, American oncologist
