= Nancy Andrews =

Nancy Andrews may refer to:

- Nancy Andrews (actress) (1920–1989), American stage and film actress
- Nancy Andrews (biologist) (born 1958), American biologist
- Nancy Lee Andrews (born 1947), American photographer
