= Nancy Lenkeith =

Nancy Lenkeith (a.k.a. Nancy Lenkeith Horneffer; 9 May 1922 - 11 Aug 2015) was an American writer. She worked for Voice of America radio. She is known for her testimony before US Senator Joseph McCarthy about dismissal from government service, defending Abraham Lincoln, reading a favorable review of Whittaker Chambers' 1952 memoir Witness, and refusing to live with her supervisor in a commune.

== Early life ==
Lenkeith was born in London, United Kingdom, circa 1922. In 1942, she graduated from Barnard College. She obtained a doctorate in philosophy. She taught at Queens College in Brooklyn, New York, for two years.

== Career ==
In December 1952, Nancy Lenkeith joined Voice of America. She was a scriptwriter of VOA broadcasts in French. Her supervisor fired her after she broadcast a review favorable to Whittaker Chambers' book, Witness. Roy Cohn solicited from her information that her superior had denounced Abraham Lincoln: "That damn Lincoln! Why do we have to talk about him again?" Senate subcommittee chairman Joseph McCarthy refused to let her relate details about a proposition received from Troup Mathews, acting head of the VOA's French section. Lenkeith testified that she was "sort of stunned" when Mathews suggested it "could be arranged" or "worked out" for her to have children with no husband. Matthews shared that he was thinking about a Marxist commune. In New York, Mathews, a decorated World War II veteran, denounced her testimony "a tissue of fabrication." Lenkeith accused him of lax supervision. Later, Matthews explained he was buying collective housing in a New York suburb and wondering whether to buy into its cooperative; McCarthy would not let him testify. As soon as McCarthy obtained her affirmation that, yes, she was an anti-Communist, he had her leave the stand.

== Personal life and death ==
In 1954, Lenkeith married Michael Horneffer (1914–1966).

Nancy Lenkeith Horneffer died age 93 near Washington, D.C. and is buried in Arlington National Cemetery.

== Works ==
- "Juan Luis Vives" in The Renaissance Philosophy of Man: Petrarca, Valla, Ficino, Pico, Pomponazzi, Vives (1948)
- "The People Really Count," New York Times (8 July 1951)
- Dante and the Legend of Rome: An Essay (1952)
