= Nancy Snow =

Nancy Snow may refer to:

- Nancy Snow (philosopher), American professor of philosophy
- Nancy Snow (academic), American professor and scholar of propaganda and public diplomacy
