= Nancy Caldwell =

Nancy Caldwell may refer to:

- Nancy Abbate Caldwell (born 1942), American actress and dancer
- Nancy Melvina Caldwell (1868–1956), schoolteacher and politician from Virginia
