= Nancy Tillman =

American author and illustrator of children's books

- Born: 1954 (age 71–72); Birmingham, Alabama, U.S.
- Occupations: Author; illustrator
- Writing career
- Genre: Children's literature
- Website: nancytillman.com

Nancy Tillman (born 1954) is an American author and illustrator of children's books.

Tillman's picture books focus on the love parents have for their children with animals. Her books On the Night You Were Born, Wherever You Are, My Love Will Find You, The Crown on Your Head, I'd Know You Anywhere, and You're Here for a Reason were New York Times best-sellers.

On the Night You Were Born was originally self-published, then re-issued by the imprint Feiwel & Friends, which has published Tillman's subsequent books.

Tillman was born in Birmingham, Alabama in 1954, and grew up in Columbus, Georgia.

== Bibliography ==
- On the Night You Were Born, 2005
- It’s Time to Sleep, My Love, by Eric Metaxas and illustrated by Nancy Tillman, 2008
- Tumford the Terrible, 2008
- The Wonder of You, 2008
- The Spirit of Christmas, 2009
- Wherever You Are My Love Will Find You, 2010
- The Crown on Your Head, 2011
- Tumford's Rude Noises, 2012
- I'd Know You Anywhere, My Love, 2013
- The Heaven of Animals, 2014
- You're Here for a Reason, 2015
- You and Me and the Wishing Tree, 2016
- You're All Kinds of Wonderful, 2017
- You Are Loved, 2018
- I Knew You Could Do It!, 2019
- Because You're Mine, 2020
