= Nancy Goldman Nossal =

American molecular biologist

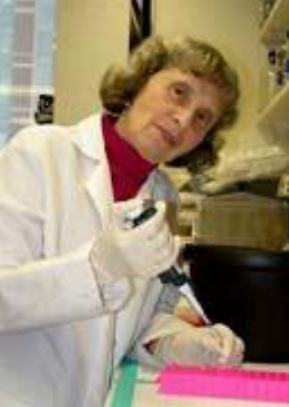
- Born: Nancy Ruth Goldman c. 1937; Fall River, Massachusetts, U.S.
- Died: September 28, 2006 (aged 69); Bethesda, Maryland, U.S.
- Education: Cornell University; University of Michigan
- Spouse: Ralph J. Nossal
- Children: 3
- Scientific career
- Fields: Molecular biology, DNA replication
- Workplaces: National Institute of Diabetes and Digestive and Kidney Diseases
- Doctoral advisor: G. Robert Greenberg

Nancy Ruth Goldman Nossal (c. 1937 - September 28, 2006) was an American molecular biologist specialized in the study of DNA replication. She was chief of the laboratory of molecular and cellular biology at the National Institute of Diabetes and Digestive and Kidney Diseases from 1992 to 2006.

== Life ==
Nossal was born c. 1937 to Dorothy Goldman in Fall River, Massachusetts and raised in Newton, Massachusetts and Syracuse, New York. She completed a bachelor's degree at Cornell University in 1958 and a Ph.D. in biochemistry at the University of Michigan in 1964. Her dissertation was titled Deoxyribonucleases of Escherichia Coli Infected with T2 Bacteriophage. G. Robert Greenberg was her doctoral advisor. In 1964, she joined the National Institutes of Health (NIH) as a postdoctoral fellow in the National Institute of Diabetes and Digestive and Kidney Diseases (NIDDK)'s laboratory of biochemistry metabolism, working with Leon A. Heppel and Maxine Singer.

In the 1960s, Nossal was one of the first women to work in molecular biology. She joined the NIDDK laboratory of biochemical pharmacology then under the direction of Herbert Tabor. She remained there until she was appointed chief of the laboratory of molecular and cellular biology in 1992. Nossal was a leader in the study of DNA replication. Nossal's work focused on DNA replication using simple T4 bacteriophage system in E. coli. By using this simple phage model, she elucidated biochemical and molecular mechanisms universally required for DNA synthesis. In 2005, she was elected a Fellow of the American Association for the Advancement of Science.

She was married to physicist Ralph J. Nossal. They had three children. Nossal died of cancer on September 28, 2006, age 69, in her home in Bethesda, Maryland.
