= Nancy Thompson =

Nancy Thompson is the name of:

- Nancy L. Thompson, American biological physicist
- Nancy Thompson (politician) (born 1947), Nebraska state senator
- Nancy Thompson (A Nightmare on Elm Street), fictional character in the Nightmare on Elm Street film series
- Nancy Thompson, fictional character in the Hazel television series
