= Nancy K. Nichols =

Mathematician

Nancy K. Nichols (born 1942) is an applied mathematician and numerical analyst whose research concerns numerical methods for differential equations, linear algebra, and control theory, and data assimilation. She is a professor in the Department of Mathematics and Statistics at the University of Reading.

In 2012, a conference was held at Reading in honour of Nichols' 70th birthday. Nichols was elected as a Fellow of the Society for Industrial and Applied Mathematics in 2014, "for contributions to the numerical analysis of systems, control, and data assimilation".
