= Nancy Sullivan =

Nancy Sullivan may refer to:

- Nancy Sullivan (American actress) (born 1969), American actress, television host and screenwriter
- Nancy Sullivan (English actress) (born 1985), English actress and singer
- Nancy Sullivan (politician) (born 1949), American politician, Maine politician and schoolteacher
- Nancy Sullivan (activist) (1957–2015), American anthropologist and activist
- Nancy Achin Sullivan (1959–2022), American politician, member of the Massachusetts Senate
- Nancy Sullivan (biologist), American cell biologist
- Nancy Benoit (1964–2007), formerly Sullivan, American professional wrestling valet and manager
