= Nancy Norton =

Nancy Norton may refer to:

- Nancy A. Norton, United States Navy vice admiral
- Nancy Belle Craft Norton (1872–1963), American educator, aided internees and prisoners of war during the Japanese occupation of the Philippines
