= Nancy Naples =

Nancy Naples may refer to:

- Nancy Naples (politician), American government official in New York
- Nancy Naples (sociologist), American sociologist
