= Nancy Skinner =

Nancy Skinner may refer to:

- Nancy Skinner (politician) (born 1954), California state senator
- Nancy Skinner (commentator), American radio host and political commentator
- Nancy Skinner Nordhoff (born 1932), American philanthropist and environmentalist
