= Nancy Hill =

Nancy Hill may refer to:

- Nancy E. Hill, American developmental psychologist
- Nancy M. Hill (1833–1919), American Civil War nurse, later a physician
- Nancy Hill (basketball) (born 1934), Australian basketball player
