= Nancy Saxton =

American politician from Utah

Nancy Saxton is an American politician, who is a former Salt Lake City Council Member and mayoral candidate.

In November 1999, Saxton was elected by the residents of Council District Four to serve a four-year term on the Salt Lake City Council, winning the election by a margin of 51.29% against Linda Lepreau.

In 2006, Saxton announced her candidacy for Salt Lake City Mayor, but had to withdraw from the race in June 2007 to seek reelection in her City Council seat. She eventually lost her re-election bid to Luke Garrott.

== Background ==
Saxton moved to Utah in 1978, coming from a small town in Northern California to attend the University of Utah. She worked at the University of Utah Medical Center as a respiratory therapist.

Having a commitment and love for the preservation of historical homes, Saxton and her husband are former owners of Saltair Bed and Breakfast and Anderson Commons Reception Center, having owned and managed five historically significant buildings.

As a small business owner, Saxton has twice been elected president of the Bed and Breakfast Inns of Utah (as well as vice-chair), serving five terms on the executive board. She has made presentations before the Professional Association of Innkeepers International in Reston, Virginia.

== Notable achievements ==
Saxton is active in her community and local neighborhood-focused organizations. Over the past 18 years she served on the East Central Community Council in several positions, including chair, vice chair, secretary, treasurer, and neighborhood representative.

- 1993 - Salt Lake City honored Saxton with the Good Neighbor Award.
- 1995 – Assisted in the zoning rewrite for Salt Lake City and a variety of master plans in the area. She was also involved in the historical South Temple Street redesign and Billboard Ordinance Committee.
- 2000 - Elected to serve as Vice Chair of the Redevelopment Agency Board. Elected again in 2004.
- 2001 - Elected to serve as the Chair of the Redevelopment Agency Board.
- 2005 - Elected to serve as Salt Lake City Council Vice Chair.

She was a member of the Community Development Advisory Committee for a total of seven years.

Saxton, a member of the Jordan River Restoration Network, addressed Salt Lake City's Sports Complex by stating on 12-11-2009: "It's very disturbing that we cannot get on the same page when this is the greenest city .... You will set back the city's endeavors centuries if you do this."
