= Helen Holden, Government Girl =

American actress of 1940s

"Helen Holden, Government Girl", was a short-lived radio serial about a woman fighting crime during World War II. The serial aired from March 3 to June 20, 1942 on MBS. It was unsuccessful, and little information about its content exists, as recordings are not known to exist.

Nancy Ordway (1914-2005), an actor who lived in Burleith, initially voiced the show's titular role. She reported that the producer wanted glamorous publicity photos, to which end he asked her to pluck her eyebrows. She declined, and was replaced by Frances Brunt after about a year.
