= Nancy Robertson =

Nancy Robertson may refer to:

- Nancy Robertson (actress), Canadian actress
- Nancy Robertson (diver) (born 1949), Canadian Olympic diver
- Nancy Robertson (WRNS officer) (1909–2000), British Royal Navy officer
