= Nancy Aptanik =

Inuk artist

- Born: 1959 (age 66–67)
- Known for: stone carvings and textile works

Nancy Aptanik (1959) is an Inuk artist known for her stone carvings and textile works.

Her work is included in the collections of the Winnipeg Art Gallery and the Penn Museum, Philadelphia.
