= Nancy Kelly (jazz singer) =

American jazz singer

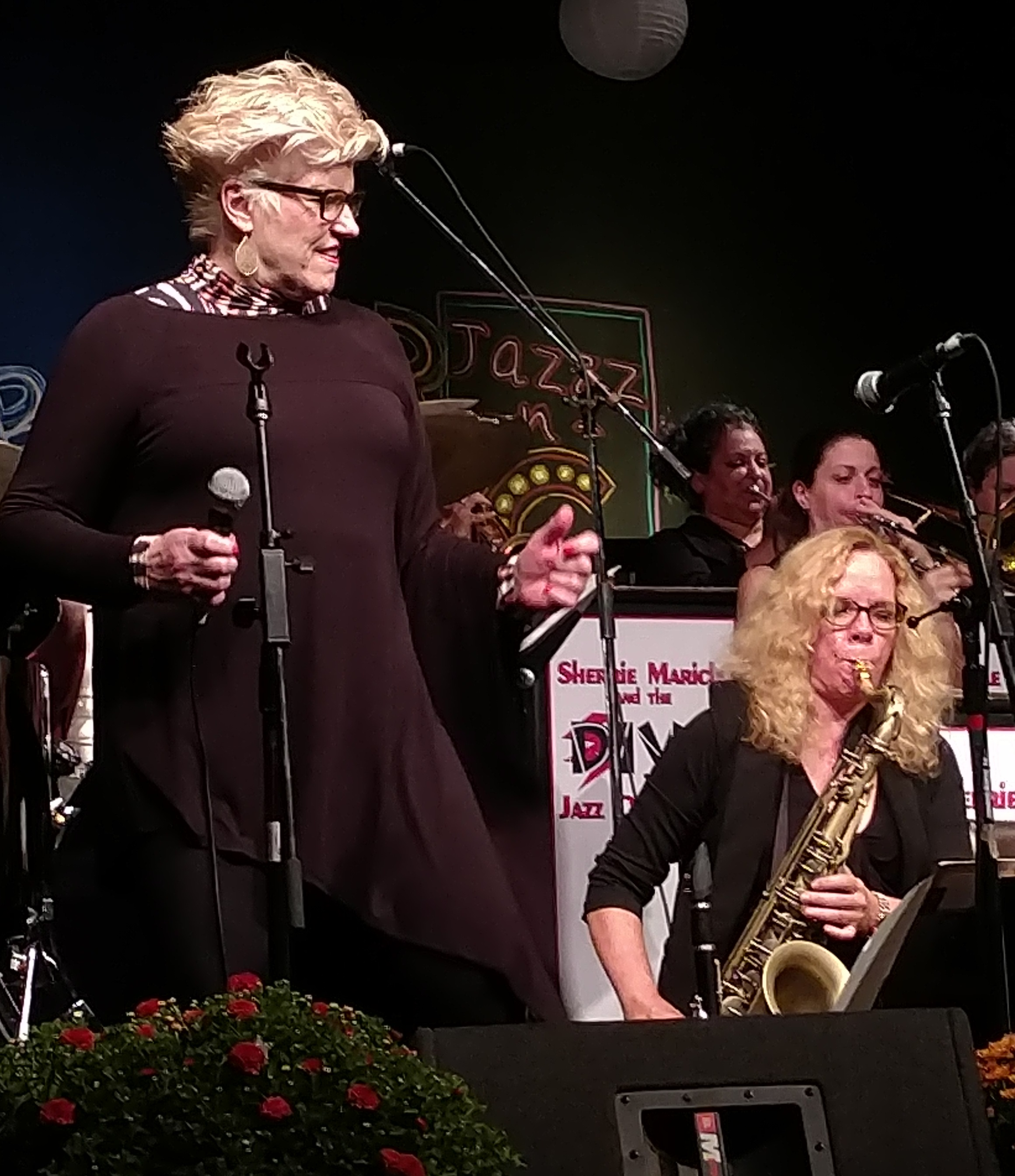
- Kelly at Jazz N Caz in 2018
- Born: Nancy Ruth Kelly; October 12, 1950 (age 75)
- Education: Eastman School of Music
- Website: nancykelly.com

Nancy Kelly is a jazz singer known for blues, swing, and bebop music.

== Biography ==
Kelly was born October 12, 1950 in Rochester, New York and began studying music at the age of four. She studied voice at the Eastman School of Music and studied piano, clarinet, drama and dance with private instructors. She gravitated to jazz because of the freedom to improvise and then formed her own group. Over the course of an illustrious, five-decade career, Kelly has honed her trademark swing/bop, take-no-prisoners, soulful, swinging style in front of audiences across the U.S. and abroad, including concerts in Singapore, Switzerland, France, Turkey, Japan, Hong Kong, Bangkok, and Jakarta. Kelly got her real education as house singer at Jewels, a jazz club in center city Philadelphia, where she shared the bill with, among others, Betty Carter, Houston Person, Etta Jones, Joey DeFrancesco, Groove Holmes and Jack McDuff. Nancy is a charter member of the Upstate Burn Society, a loosely organized group including Don Menza, Joe Romano, and several other Jazz Illuminati from Upstate New York. Kelly was inducted into the Rochester Music Hall of Fame on May 1, 2022 (Class of 2020). Past Alumni include trumpeters Chuck Mangione and Lew Soloff; opera star Renee Fleming, bass legend Ron Carter, drummer Steve Gadd and vibraphonist Joe Locke. Kelly appears regularly in New York City, at such hallowed venues as The Blue Note, Birdland, The Rainbow Room, and Dizzy’s at JALC. She also works frequently in Los Angeles and Miami, and at countless jazz clubs, festivals, and as part of symphony orchestra engagements across the country. She was twice named “Best Female Jazz Vocalist” in the Down Beat Readers’ Poll. She has recorded six critically-acclaimed recordings. Her first recording, Live Jazz, reached #11 on the Billboard jazz charts. Born to Swing and her fourth recording, Well Alright, feature guest tenor saxophonist Houston Person. Nancy’s highly acclaimed B That Way enjoyed eight solid weeks in the top 50 on the national Jazz Week charts and received rave reviews worldwide. Her most recent full album, Remembering Mark Murphy, was hailed as one of the top 20 Jazz recordings of 2019.

== Career ==
Nancy has performed with:

- The Nelson Riddle Orchestra
- The Benny Goodman Orchestra
- Houston Person
- Harry Allen
- Joey Defrancesco
- Mark Murphy
- Clayton Cameron
- Eric Reed
- Tamir Hendelman
- Randy Brecker

Nancy has shared billing with:

- Dizzy Gillespie
- Chick Corea
- Little Jimmy Scott
- Dianne Reeves
- New York Voices
- George Benson
- World Saxophone Quartet
- Terry Gibbs
- Eddie Gomez
- Dave Brubeck
- McCoy Tyner
- Diane Schuur
- Roberta Flack
- Michael McDonald

In 2007 Kelly was honored to take part in the Visiting Songbirds Series along with Nancy King and Rebecca Parris at Bake's Place in Washington State.

== Discography ==
- 1988 Live Jazz (Amherst)
- 1997 Singin’ & Swingin’ (Amherst)
- 2006 Born to Swing (Amherst)
- 2009 Well, Alright! (Saying It With Jazz)
- 2014 B That Way (Bluebay)
- 2019 Remembering Mark Murphy (SubCat)
- 2022 Jazz Woman (SubCat)
- 2025 Be Cool (Origin)

== Awards and honors ==
- 2020 Rochester Hall of Fame
- 2018 Jazz N Caz Award
- Unsung Heroine Award ... for achievements in music National Organization of Women
- "Best Female Jazz Vocalist” in the Downbeat Reader's Poll in two separate years
- Syracuse Area Music (SAMMY) Awards - Syracuse, New York :

SAMMY Awards
Hall of Fame	2006	Nancy Kelly
Best Jazz Vocalist	1999	Nancy Kelly
Best Jazz Vocalist	1993	Nancy Kelly
Best Jazz Group	1993	Nancy Kelly and the Little Big Band
