= Nancy Warren =

Nancy Warren may refer to:

- Nancy Warren (author) (born 1959), Canadian author of romance novels
- Nancy Warren (politician), American member of the New Hampshire House of Representatives
- Nancy Warren (baseball) (1921–2001), American baseball pitcher and infielder
