= Nancy Marion =

American economist

Academic background
- Education: Princeton University; Oberlin College

Academic work
- Discipline: International Macroeconomics; International Finance
- Institutions: Dartmouth College, Professor of Economics
- Website: http://www.dartmouth.edu/~nmarion/index.html; Information at IDEAS / RePEc

Nancy Peregrim Marion is the George J. Records 1956 Professor of Economics at Dartmouth College, where she conducts research in a "variety of topics in international macroeconomics, including financial crises in emerging markets, international reserve holdings in East Asia, international risk sharing, and policy volatility in developing countries."

== Background and research ==
Marion's research focuses on International Macroeconomics and International Finance . Her research has been published in a number of top economic journals such as the Journal of International Economics. In addition to teaching undergraduate courses, she serves on the Editorial Advisory Board of the Review of International Economics, International Journal of Finance and Economics, and the International Economics and Economic Policy. In addition, she is a consultant for the International Monetary Fund.

Marion was the Chair of the Economics Department at Dartmouth College from 2000 to 2002. She was also the Associate Dean of Faculty for the Social Sciences at Dartmouth College from 2010 to 2015.

== Education ==
Marion graduated Phi Beta Kappa from Oberlin College in 1971 with a B.A. in Economics and from Princeton University in 1972 with an M.P.A. in Public Policy. She graduated from Princeton University in 1977 with a Ph.D. in economics.

== Bibliography ==
- Nancy P. Marion; Robert P. Flood (April 2002). Holding International Reserves in an Era of High Capital Mobility. International Monetary Fund. ISBN 978-1-4518-9503-2.
