= Nancy Stuart =

Nancy Stuart may refer to:

- Nancy M. Stuart, American portrait photographer
- Nancy Rubin Stuart (born 1944), American author and journalist
