= Nancy Lee =

Nancy Lee may refer to:

- Nancy Lee (writer) (born 1970), Canadian writer
- Nancy Lee (producer) (born c. 1970), Canadian sports journalist and television producer
- Nancy Lee Andrews (born 1947), American former international model and current photographer
- Nancy Lee Bass (1917–2013), American philanthropist
- Nancy Lee Gossels, American artist, editor, and poet
- Nancy Lee Grahn (born 1958), American soap opera actress
- Nancy Lee Harris, American educator and medical professional
- Nancy Lee Katz (1947–2018), American photographer
- Nancy Lee Peluso, American rural sociologist
- Nancy Lee Swann (1881–1966), American Sinologist and library curator
- Nancy Y. Lee, Taiwanese-American radiation oncologist
- Nancy Johnson (born Nancy Elizabeth Lee, 1935), American politician
- Nancy Lee, a racehorse which won the 1921 Kentucky Oaks
