= Nancy Davis (disambiguation) =

Nancy Davis (1921–2016) was an American actress and, as Nancy Reagan, First Lady of the United States.

Nancy Davis may also refer to:

- Nancy D. Griffeth (Nancy Davis Griffeth, born 1945), American computer scientist
- Jan Davis (Nancy Jan Davis, born 1953), American astronaut
- Nancy Davis (businesswoman) (born c. 1977), American investor and businesswoman

== See also ==
- Nan Davis (born 1962), American champion long-distance runner, a/k/a Nan Doak-Davis
