= Nancy Henry (professor) =

American historian

Nancy Henry (born 1965) is an American historian of English Studies at University of Tennessee, currently a Distinguished Humanities Professor.
