= Nancy White =

Nancy White may refer to:

- Nancy White (editor) (1916–2002), American editor of Harper's Bazaar
- Nancy White (field hockey), American former field hockey player
- Nancy White (singer-songwriter) (born 1944), Canadian singer-songwriter
- Nancy Metz White (1934–2018), American artist
