= Nancy Kangeryuaq Sevoga =

Inuk artist (born 1936)

Nancy Kangeryuaq Sevoga (born 1936) is an Inuk artist.

Her work is included in the collections of the National Gallery of Canada and the Art Gallery of Guelph.
