= Nancy Ross =

Nancy Ross may refer to:

- Nancy Ross (politician), American political activist associated with the New Alliance Party
- Nancy L. Ross, American geoscientist
- Nancy Wilson Ross (1904–1986), American novelist
- Nancy Ross, co-founder of She (American band)
