= Nancy Alonso =

Cuban biologist (1949–2018)

Nancy Alonso (Havana, 1949 – 3 April 2018) was a Cuban biologist, university professor, and writer. She is an Alba de Céspedes Female Narrative Prize laureate and received an honorable mention in the David Short Story Prize. Among her notable books are Tirar la Primera Piedra (1997), Cerrado por reparación (2002) and Desencuentro (2009).

== Selected works ==
- 1997, Tirar la primera piedra.
- 2002, Cerrado por reparación.
- 2007, Closed for Repairs translation by Anne Fountain.(ISBN 978-193-189-632-0)
- 2009, Desencuentro. (ISBN 978-959-209-895-4)
- 2015, Damas de Social.

== Awards ==
- 1995: Mención Premio David.
- 2002: Premio de Narrativa Femenina Alba de Céspedes
- 2015: Premio Anual de la Crítica Literaria, La Habana, Cuba.

== Works in anthologies ==
- Estatuas de sal. Ediciones Unión. 1996.
- Rumba senza palme né caresse. Besa, Nardó. 1996.
- Cubana. Beacon Press, Boston. 1998.
- Habaneras. Txalaparta, País Vasco. 2000.
- Cuentistas cubanas contemporáneas. Editorial Biblioteca de Textos Universitarios. Salta. Argentina. 2000
- Making a Scene. Mango, Londres. 2002.
- Caminos de Eva, Voces desde la Isla. Editorial Plaza Mayor. Puerto Rico. 2002.
- Cuentistas cubanas de hoy. Océano. México. 2002.
- Las musas inquietantes. Lecturum. México, y Ediciones Unión. 2003.
- Open your Eyes and Soar. White Pine Press, Búfalo, New York. 2003).
- Mi sagrada familia. Editorial Oriente, Santiago de Cuba. 2004).
- Cuentos infieles. Editorial Letras Cubanas. 2006. ISBN 959-209-713-5
- Nosotras dos. Ediciones Unión. 2008.
- Cuba on the Edge. Cultural and Communications Press. UK. 2008.
- Cuentos con aroma a tabaco. Editorial Popular. España. 2008.

=== Bibliography ===
- "Ganó Nancy Alonso el Alba de Céspedes". La Ventana.
- "Introducing Cuban author Nancy Alonso". PAMLA. 2016.
- Hernández Hormilla, Helen. Palabras sin velo. Caminos. p. 297. ISBN 978-959-303-070-0.
- Alfonso, Vitalina (enero-febrero 2004). "Delirios cotidianos". La Gaceta de Cuba.
- González López Waldo. El cierre de Nancy Alonso.
- Campuzano, Luisa. Las muchachas de la Habana no tienen temor de Dios. Ediciones Unión. ISBN 959-209-605-8.
- Yáñez Quiñoa, Mirta (2000). Cubanas a capítulo. Editorial Oriente.
- Espinosa Domínguez Carlos. Franz Kafka en Luyanó.
- Literatura de mujeres y cambio social: narradoras cubanas de hoy. (32). 2003.
- Yáñez Quiñoa, Mirta. Cubanas a capítulo. Segunda temporada. Editorial Letras Cubanas. p. 164. ISBN 978-959-10-1842-7.
- de Diego, Josefina (3 de marzo de 2015). "Damas y damiselas en la Feria del Libro". Cubanobooks.
- López del Amo, Rolando (9 al 15 de ener de 2016). "Las Damas de Social". La Jiribilla. Año XII (757).
- Diario de Cuba. "Conceden el Premio Anual de la Crítica Literaria a una decena de obras".
