= Nancy Gutiérrez =

Nancy Gutiérrez may refer to:

- Nancy Gutiérrez (footballer) (born 1987), Mexican-American soccer player
- Nancy Gutierrez (Arizona politician), American politician and former math teacher
- Nancy Patricia Gutiérrez (born 1963), Colombian lawyer and politician
