= Nancy Lin =

American oncologist

Nancy U. Lin
- Education: Dana–Farber Cancer Institute; Harvard Medical School
- Scientific career
- Workplaces: Dana–Farber Cancer Institute

Nancy Lin is an American oncologist who works at the Dana-Farber Cancer Institute and is an Associate Professor of Medicine at Harvard Medical School. Her research considers new diagnostic strategies and treatment pathways for HER2 positive breast cancer.

== Early life and education ==
Lin was trained in medicine at Harvard Medical School. She remained in Massachusetts for her residency and fellowship, during which she was based at the Brigham and Women's Hospital. She completed her fellowship in oncology at the Dana–Farber Cancer Institute. She was awarded the Breast Cancer Research Foundation Westchester Women's Award in Memory of Marla Mehlman in 2007.

== Research and career ==
After completing her medical training, Lin focused on the diagnosis, treatment and outcomes of people with breast cancer. In particular, she worked on HER2 positive breast cancer and breast cancer patients with brain metastasis. Lin has developed novel pharmaceuticals for patients whose breast cancer has spread to the brain. Cancer-related central nervous system and brain metastases result in genomic alterations which are poorly understood. Lin has used the EMBRACE (Ending Metastatic Breast Cancer for Everyone) database, which contains information from several thousand metastatic breast cancer patients. She sequenced almost 800 tumor samples. These investigations will help to identify genomic predictors of breast cancer related metastases.

Lin is interested in the effectiveness of antibody-drug conjugates in early and metastatic-stage breast cancer. Amongst these, trastuzumab deruxtecan has demonstrated intracranial activity. She showed that Tucatinib in combination with trastuzumab can improve the outcomes of people with breast cancer and brain metastasis. Lin was made the Associate Chief of Breast Oncology at the Dana–Farber Cancer Institute in 2018.

== Selected publications ==
- Lesley Seymour; Jan Bogaerts; Andrea Perrone; et al. (2 March 2017). "iRECIST: guidelines for response criteria for use in trials testing immunotherapeutics". The Lancet Oncology. 18 (3): e143–e152. doi:10.1016/s1470-2045(17)30074-8. ISSN 1470-2045. PMC 5648544. PMID 28271869. Wikidata Q38748974.
- Nancy U Lin; Jennifer R Bellon; Eric P Winer (1 September 2004). "CNS metastases in breast cancer". Journal of Clinical Oncology. 22 (17): 3608–3617. doi:10.1200/jco.2004.01.175. ISSN 0732-183X. PMID 15337811. Wikidata Q35874807.
- Nancy U Lin; Véronique Diéras; Devchand Paul; et al. (1 February 2009). "Multicenter phase II study of lapatinib in patients with brain metastases from HER2-positive breast cancer". Clinical Cancer Research. 15 (4): 1452–1459. doi:10.1158/1078-0432.ccr-08-1080. ISSN 1078-0432. PMID 19228746. Wikidata Q46116627.
