= Nancy Scott =

American theatre critic (1931–2005)

Nancy Scott (August 18, 1931 – August 19, 2005) was an American theatre and movie critic who worked for the San Francisco Examiner newspaper from the late 1970s to the early 1990s.

== Background ==
Nancy duBois Scott was born in Denver, Colorado, growing up there and in the Estes Park area. She attended Wellesley College in 1949 and 1951, and in 1950 married John W. Drake. From 1959 to 1969, she was employed by the People's World in San Francisco and, after freelancing for a while, joined the San Francisco Examiner in 1977.

Scott was integral to expanding the Examiner′s coverage of theater and film beyond the traditional venues to the small and avant-garde performances and movies that were blossoming in the San Francisco Bay Area—including an early review of The Reduced Shakespeare Company that brought that acting troop its first mainstream notice.

The Bay Area theater community acknowledged Scott’s efforts in the mid-1980s when a poll of Bay Area theaters voted her the best theater critic.
