= Nancy Jones (missionary) =

African-American schoolteacher and missionary

Nancy "Nannie" Jones (January 8, 1860 - July 1939) was an African-American schoolteacher and missionary to Mozambique and Southern Rhodesia.

A native of Hopkinsville, Kentucky, Jones moved with her family in childhood to Memphis, Tennessee, where she attended the Lemoyne Institute. She graduated from Fisk University in 1886; during her time there she worked as a student teacher in Walls, Mississippi. She was a member of the First Colored Baptist Church in Memphis. She applied to the American Board of Commissioners for Foreign Missions, a Congregationalist organization, for a missionary posting, and in 1888 was sent to work in Mozambique, the first unmarried black woman commissioned by the Board. She was sent to Kambini, in the Inhambane region, where she worked alongside two other black missionaries, Benjamin and Henrietta Bailey Ousley. Initially a teacher of the primary grades at the village school, she soon took charge of the operations of that division; she also visited areas nearby, eventually opening a school for children from other villages.

In 1893 Jones was sent to the Gaza mission in Southern Rhodesia, at first working again as a teacher in the local school. She was removed from this post and relegated to menial housekeeping tasks; her fellow missionaries refused to share housing with her. Citing this prejudice as a reason, she resigned from the mission in 1887 and returned to Memphis, where she continued her teaching career. Accompanying her was an African girl named Mary Jones (born 1883) whose status is unknown; she may have been Nancy's adopted daughter. For a time she taught in DeSoto County, Mississippi. Eventually she moved to Tunica County in the same state, where with the assistance of David Reid she established the Colored Normal, Industrial and Mechanical School of Tunica near Prichard in 1920. Jones continued living in Mississippi until her death; she was buried at Belmont Baptist Church near Prichard.
