= Nancy Haegel =

American solar power researcher

Nancy Haegel is an American electrical engineer, materials scientist, and solar power researcher, known for her work on semiconductors and large-scale photovoltaic energy systems. Other topics in her research include imaging electronic processes and detecting nuclear radiation. Formerly a distinguished professor of physics at the Naval Postgraduate School, she is the director of the Materials Science Center in the National Renewable Energy Laboratory, and a director of the Research Corporation.

== Education and career ==
Haegel is originally from New Haven, Connecticut, but grew up in Ohio, where her father and mother worked as an accountant and Latin teacher, respectively. She studied materials science and engineering at the University of Notre Dame, graduating as co-valedictorian. She continued the study of materials science and engineering as a graduate student at the University of California, Berkeley, supported by an NSF Graduate Fellowship, performing her research under the direction of Prof. Eugene Haller at the nearby Lawrence Berkeley National Laboratory. Earning a master's degree along the way, she completed her Ph.D. at Berkeley in 1985, and became a postdoctoral researcher at the Siemens Research Laboratory in Germany.

Returning to the US, Haegel took a faculty position at the University of California, Los Angeles, as an assistant professor of materials science. She moved to Fairfield University, in part to be closer to her ailing mother, and ten years later moved back to California, taking a position as distinguished professor of physics at the Naval Postgraduate School. She moved again to the National Renewable Energy Laboratory in 2014.

== Recognition ==
In 2017, Haegel was named a Fellow of the American Physical Society (APS), after a nomination from the APS Topical Group on Energy Research and Applications, "for advances in the characterization and understanding of advanced semiconductor materials for clean energy, international space astronomy, and national security; and for inspiring and developing the next generation of scientific leaders through physics education and research". She is also a Humboldt Fellow, a Fulbright Scholar, and a Kellogg Foundation Fellow.
