= Nancy Yeide =

American art curator

Nancy H. Yeide was the head of the Department of Curatorial Records at the National Gallery of Art, Washington, from 1990 to 2017. She is a specialist in World War Two-era provenance research, particularly relating to the Hermann Göring collection of which she has written the first comprehensive catalog.

Yeide holds a Master of Arts degree from American University. She appeared in the documentary film, The Rape of Europa, in which she discussed the Goering collection.

== Selected publications ==
- The American Association of Museum's Guide to Provenance Research. 2001. (With Konstantin Akinsha & Amy L. Walsh) ISBN 093120173X
- Beyond the Dreams of Avarice: The Hermann Goering Collection. Laurel Publishing, Dallas, 2009. ISBN 0977434915
