= Nancy González =

Nancy González may refer to:

- Nancy González (actress) (1952–2024), Venezuelan actress
- Nancy González (model) (born 1943), Miss Venezuela 1965
- Nancy González (politician) (born 1961), Argentine politician
- Nancy González (volleyball) (born 1963), Cuban volleyball player
- Nancy Gonzalez (handbag designer) (born 1952 or 1953), Colombian handbag designer
- Nancy González Ulloa (born 1977), Mexican politician
