= Nancy Boyd =

Nancy Boyd may refer to:

- Edna St. Vincent Millay (1892–1950), American poet and playwright who used the pen name Nancy Boyd
- Nancy Boyd-Franklin (born 1950), American psychologist and writer
- Nancy Boyd (singer) (born 1963), Belgian singer
