= Nancy Iza Moreno =

Kichwa leader

Nancy Iza Moreno is a Kichwa leader and Coordinadora Andina de Organizaciones Indígenas organizer.
