= Nancy McCormick =

Nancy McCormick may refer to:

- Nancy Fowler McCormick (1835–1923), American philanthropist
- Nancy Lay-McCormick (born 1962), American soccer player and referee
- Nancy McCormick Rambusch (1927–1994), American educator
