= Nancy Paterson =

Nancy Paterson may refer to:

- Nancy Paterson (lawyer) (1953–2010), American jurist
- Nancy Paterson (artist) (1957–2018), Canadian artist
