= Nancy Keating =

American physician

Nancy Lynn Keating
- Born: Maryland
- Education: Virginia Tech; University of Chicago Pritzker School of Medicine; Harvard T.H. Chan School of Public Health; Brigham and Women's Hospital
- Scientific career
- Workplaces: Brigham and Women's Hospital; Harvard Medical School

Nancy Keating is an American physician who works at the Brigham and Women's Hospital and is a professor at Harvard Medical School. Her research considers the factors that influence quality care for people suffering from cancer.

== Early life and education ==
Keating grew up in Maryland. She attended Fallston High School. Keating was an undergraduate student at Virginia Tech, where she majored in biochemistry. She was a medical student at the University of Chicago Pritzker School of Medicine and completed her internships and residency at the Brigham and Women's Hospital. She was a medical clinical fellow at the Harvard Medical School. Alongside her fellowship in health care policy, Keating was a student in the Harvard T.H. Chan School of Public Health where she earned a Master's in public health and specialized in clinical effectiveness.

== Research and career ==
Keating was appointed to the faculty at the Harvard Medical School in 1998. She was awarded the Society of General Internal Medicine Outstanding Junior Investigator Award in 2005, and promoted to Professor in 2014. Her research considers healthcare equity and improving access to quality cancer care.

Keating is a member of the National Cancer Institute Cancer Care Outcomes Research and Surveillance (canCORS) consortium. CanCORS examines the treatment pathways and outcomes of patients with colorectal cancer. She analyzed the quality of cancer care for people in the Veterans Health Administration. She considered how geography, ethnicity and age impacted veteran health outcomes. She showed that cancer-related imaging was lower in the Veterans Health Administration than in the fee-for-service Medicare. She also showed that Black veterans were considerably less likely to receive surgery for early stage lung cancer or appropriate radiotherapy than their white counterparts.

Keating is interested in end-of-life care for people who experience advanced cancer. She showed that variations in the intensity of end-of-life treatment have less to do with patients' wishes than they do with treatment availability and a physician's discomfort in speaking about end-of-life choices. Keating is committed to oncologists providing appropriate and correct information to people with cancer. She has shown that very few people with fatal cancers have an accurate understanding of their illness, with almost half not every talking to their parents about their life expectancy. She has examined variations in the cost and quality of cancer care across Massachusetts.

Keating is evaluating the Oncology Care Model of the Centers for Medicare & Medicaid Services. The Oncology Care Model provides a new approach to delivering oncology services, using new financial incentives and appropriate levels of care across the United States.

Nancy Keating is using data and research from multiple resources to help bring better care to all cancer patients.

== Awards and honors ==
- 2006 Elected Fellow of the American College of Physicians
- 2010 Elected Fellow of the American Society for Clinical Investigation
- 2011, 2013, 2015, 2017 Harvard Medical School Excellence in Tutoring Award
- 2015 Harvard Medical School A. Clifford Barger Excellence in Mentoring Award
- 2017 Elected Fellow of the Association of American Physicians
- 2018 University of Chicago Alumni Association Distinguished Service Award
- 2019 Health Affairs Top Ten Article of 2018

== Selected publications ==
- Keating, Nancy; A James O'Malley; Matthew R Smith (2006). "Diabetes and cardiovascular disease during androgen deprivation therapy for prostate cancer". Journal of Clinical Oncology. 24 (27): 4448–4456. doi:10.1200/jco.2006.06.2497. PMID 16983113. Wikidata Q80285083.
- Jane C. Weeks; Paul J. Catalano; Angel Cronin; Matthew D. Finkelman; Jennifer W. Mack; Nancy L. Keating; Deborah Schrag (2012). "Patients' expectations about effects of chemotherapy for advanced cancer". The New England Journal of Medicine. 367 (17): 1616–25. doi:10.1056/nejmoa1204410. PMC 3613151. PMID 23094723. Wikidata Q24597282.
- Jim C Hu; Xiangmei Gu; Stuart R Lipsitz; Michael J Barry; D'Amico, Anthony; Aaron C Weinberg; Keating, Nancy (2009). "Comparative effectiveness of minimally invasive vs open radical prostatectomy". JAMA. 302 (14): 1557–1564. doi:10.1001/jama.2009.1451. PMID 19826025. Wikidata Q42636571.

== Personal life ==
Keating was married in 2003.
