= Nancy Hopkins =

Nancy Hopkins may refer to:

- Nancy Hopkins (aviator) (1909–1997), American aviator
- Nancy Hopkins (scientist) (born 1943), American MIT scientist
