= Nancy Hanks (disambiguation) =

Nancy Hanks (1784–1818) was the mother of Abraham Lincoln, the 16th President of the United States of America.

Nancy Hanks may also refer to:

- Nancy Hanks (horse), an American Standardbred racehorse
- Nancy Hanks (art historian) (1927–1983), second chairman of the National Endowment for the Arts
- Nancy Hanks (train), a passenger train running between Atlanta and Savannah in the U.S. state of Georgia
