= Nancy Yuen =

Nancy Yuen may refer to:

- Nancy Yuen (singer) (born 1967), Hong Kong-born Singaporean singer
- Nancy Wang Yuen (born 1976/1977), American sociologist at Biola University
