= Nancy Shepherd =

American politician (born 1954)

Mayor of Palo Alto
- In office January 2014 – January 2015
- Deputy: Liz Kniss
- Preceded by: Gregory Scharff
- Succeeded by: Karen Holman

Personal details
- Born: 1954 (age 71–72) San Francisco, California
- Party: Independent
- Spouse: Mark R. Shepherd
- Education: San Francisco State University

Nancy Shepherd was a Mayor of the City of Palo Alto, California. She was elected to office by the Palo Alto City Council on 6 January 2014, and replaced by fellow councilwoman Karen Holman on 5 January 2016.

Shepherd was born in San Francisco, California in 1954. She attended college at the San Francisco State University, graduating with a master's degree in international relations. Shepherd was elected to the Palo Alto City Council in 2010, serving as councilwoman until being appointed mayor.
