= Nancy Jay =

American feminist sociologist of religion (1929–1991)

Nancy Jay (1929–1991) was an American feminist sociologist of religion and is best known for her posthumously published book Throughout Your Generations Forever.

== Biography ==
Nancy Jay was born in South Africa and was raised in New England. Between 1946 and 1949, Jay attended Radcliffe College, but paused her studies to raise her family. Jay remarried and returned to Radcliffe, graduating with a BA in Anthropology in 1967. After briefly studying clinical psychology at Harvard, Jay enrolled in a Sociology graduate program at Brandeis University, eventually earning her doctorate in 1981 under the guidance of Egon Bittner and Kurt Wolff.

Jay was a research associate and lecturer in the Women's Studies in Religion Program at Harvard Divinity School between 1981 and 1991, studying theoretical approaches to the sociology of religion outlined by Émile Durkheim and Max Weber through the lens of gender studies.

Nancy Jay died in 1991 and Throughout Your Generations Together was published posthumously the following year. Following its publication, Throughout Your Generations Together was reviewed positively by academics and won the 1993 American Academy of Religion Award for Excellence in the Study of Religion in the category of Analytical-Descriptive Studies.

== Thought ==
In Throughout Your Generations Forever, Jay argued that across multiple cultures, blood sacrifice maintained and legitimated patrilineal kinship structures. Unlike maternal parentage, the paternity of an infant prior to genetic paternity testing was uncertain. To construct an unambiguous patriline without illegitimate sons, patriarchs developed sacrificial rituals which were transmitted between father and son. Jay argued that the opposition between the purifying power of sacrifice performed by men counteracted the pollution of childbirth and menstruation performed by women, allowing patrilineal societies to create pure paternal lineages. Among multiple cultures including the Ancient Greeks, the Hebrews, the Romans, the Nuer, the Ashanti Kingdom, and the Native Hawaiians, Jay noted that sacrifice was performed by men virtually exclusively, with rare exceptions of women in non-reproductive roles (e.g. consecrated virgins, post-menopausal women) performing certain sacrificial rites. Jay further extends this analysis to the Roman Catholic Church, arguing that the sacrificial tradition of the Eucharist is inseparable from Apostolic Succession.
