= Nancy Alvarez =

Nancy Alvarez may refer to:

- Nancy Alvarez (psychologist) (born 1950), Dominican television personality, psychologist, sexologist, and family therapist
- Nancy Álvarez (triathlete) (born 1976), Argentine triathlete
