= Nancy Karigithu =

Kenyan politician and activist

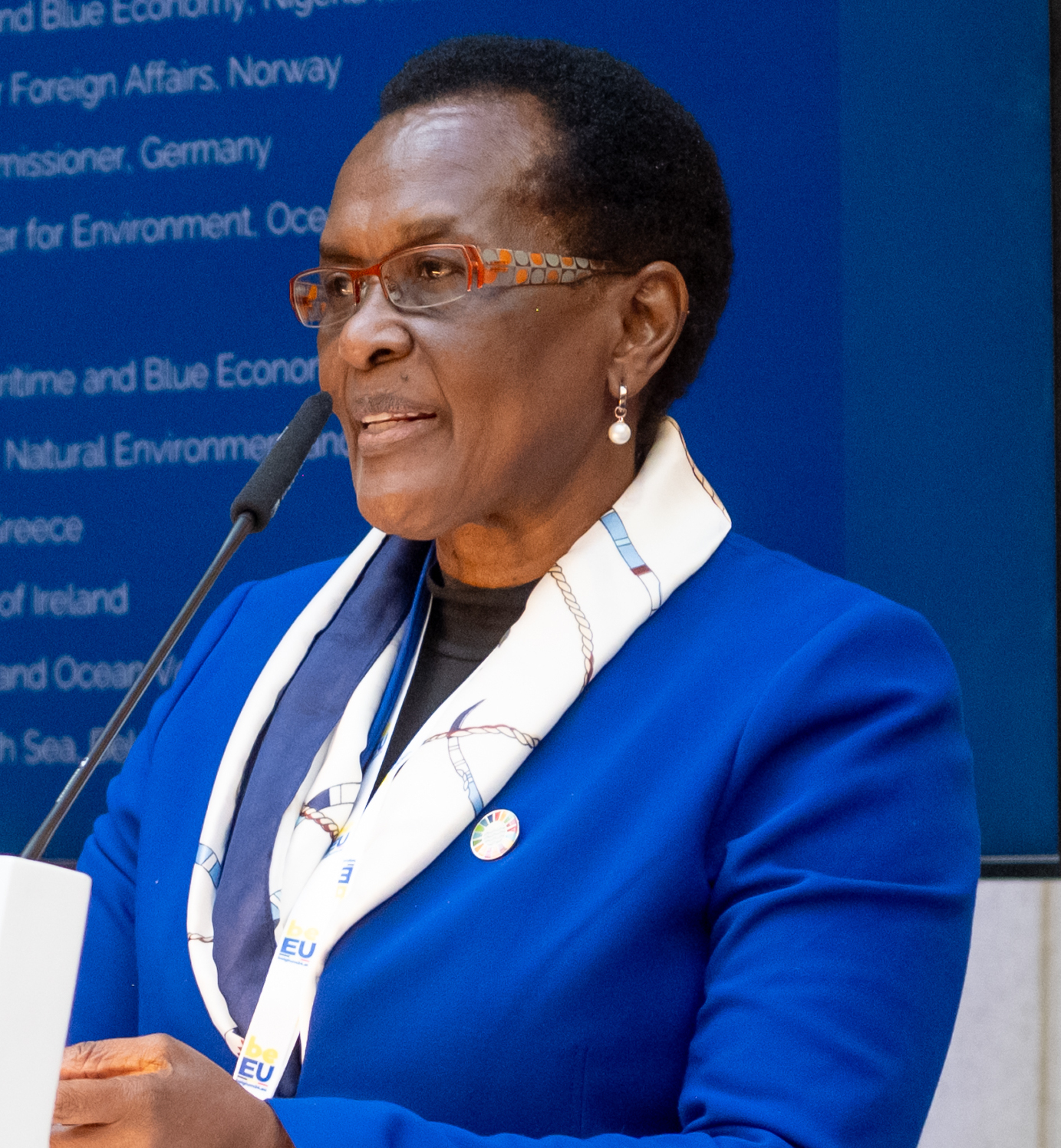
- Nancy Karigithu in Brussels for the Blue Leaders conference in 2024.
- Born: September 6, 1959 (age 66); Nairobi, Kenya
- Citizenship: Kenya
- Education: master's degree in International Maritime law obtained from the IMO International Maritime Law Institute, Malta
- Alma mater: University of Nairobi
- Occupation: International Maritime Law Expert
- Years active: 2000 - present
- Employer(s): Ministry of Transport, Infrastructure, Housing, Urban Development

Nancy Karigithu is a long serving public officer. She is the current Principal Secretary and State Department for Shipping and Maritime in the Ministry of Transport, Infrastructure, Housing, Urban Development as well as Public Works. From 2004 to 2005, Karigithu served as Transport Expert for the African Union.

== Early life ==
Karigithu was born in Kenya.

== Education ==
Karigithu holds a bachelor's degree in law from the University of Nairobi. She also obtained a master's degree in International Maritime law from the IMO International Maritime Law Institute, Malta.

== Career ==
Malta has also worked as the Director General of the Kenya Maritime Authority, for about nine years, and being the chairperson of the International Maritime Authority where for three terms. She is the member on the Board of Governors of the World Maritime University in Malmo, Sweden.

Karigithu has also worked as a State Counsel in the Office of the Attorney General, as well as the Senior Legal Officer at the Kenya Ports Authority where she became an Assistant Corporation Secretary.

In 2023, Karigithu was narrowly defeated in a bid to become secretary general of the International Maritime Organization, but had strong support from African nations.
