= Nancy Obuchowski =

American biostatistician

Nancy A. Obuchowski (born 1962) is an American biostatistician whose research concerns the accuracy of image-based medical diagnoses, including the use of nonparametric statistics, receiver operating characteristic curves, and accounting for the effects of clustered data in this application. She works at the Lerner Research Institute of the Cleveland Clinic as vice chair of Quantitative Health Sciences, with a joint appointment in the Department of Diagnostic Radiology. She is also a professor in the Cleveland Clinic Lerner College of Medicine of Case Western Reserve University.

== Education and career ==
Obuchowski majored in biology at the University of New Hampshire, graduating in 1984. She went to the University of Pittsburgh for graduate study in biostatistics, earning a master's degree in 1987 and completing her Ph.D. in 1991, the year in which she joined the Cleveland Institute.

== Books ==
Obuchowski is a co-author of the book Statistical Methods in Diagnostic Medicine (with Xiao-Hua Zhou and Donna K. McClish, Wiley, 2002; 2nd ed., 2011). With G. Scott Gazelle, she is co-editor of Handbook for Clinical Trials of Imaging and Image-Guided Interventions (Wiley, 2016).

== Recognition ==
She was named a Fellow of the American Statistical Association in 2008. In 2015, the University of Pittsburgh Graduate School of Public Health gave her their Alumni Award for Research.
