= Nancy Prichard =

Computer Expert

Nancy Montague McCandlish Prichard (1916 – September 30, 2006) was a computer and Special Assistant at the Smithsonian Astrophysical Observatory. There she assisted Charles Greeley Abbot with research on solar radiation and its effect on the weather. During World War II, she joined the Office of Strategic Services (OSS) as a civilian employee and was stationed in Cairo, Egypt. After the war, she volunteered for many years with the Fairfax City Jail Ministry, where she was recognized for her work in human rights, justice, and equality by the National Conference of Christians and Jews. She also became involved with the Episcopal Church, the League of Women Voters, and her local Democratic Committee.

== Early life and education ==
Prichard was born in Fairfax, Virginia where she lived most of her life. She graduated from Sweet Briar College in 1938 and later earned a master's degree in Criminal Justice from American University in 1974.

== Personal life ==
Nancy met and married her husband, Edgar Allen Prichard, while in Cairo. They had three children.
