= Nancy E. Levinger =

American chemistry professor

Nancy Levinger
- Education: BA, Northwestern University, 1983 PhD, University of Colorado, 1990 NSF Postdoc, University of Minnesota, 1990-92
- Website: https://wp.natsci.colostate.edu/levingerlab/

Nancy E Levinger is an American chemist and chemistry professor at Colorado State University. Her research interests include laser spectroscopy. She has received awards for her research, teaching, and mentorship.

== Career ==
Levinger became a faculty member at Colorado State University in 1992. She was promoted to associate professor in 1999 and earned the rank of professor in 2005. She has held leadership positions such as the chair of the Research Experiences for Undergraduates Leadership Group of the National Science Foundation from 2001-2004.

In 2006, Levinger was named a Fellow of the American Physical Society's Division of Chemical Physics for her "pioneering work on dynamics in the condensed phase, especially molecular assemblies at liquid interfaces and in confined environments by ultrafast spectroscopic scattering."

== Awards and Honors ==
- University Distinguished Teaching Scholar of Colorado State University (2007)
- Fellow of the American Physical Society (2005)
- Margaret Haseleus Award (2004)
- Oliver P. Pennock Distinguished Service Award (2020)
- COACS Lifetime Award of the Rocky Mountain Regional Meeting of the American Chemical Society (2020)
- Colorado State University College of Natural Sciences Faculty Undergraduate Research Mentoring Award (1999)
- National Science Foundation Young Investigator Award (1994-1999)
- National Science Foundation Postdoctoral Fellowship in chemistry (1990-1992)

In addition, a former student endowed an undergraduate research fellowship at Colorado State University in Levinger's name.

== Works ==
Levinger has published scientific research in academic journals such as Chemical Reviews.

Levinger contributed to the article "Direct observation of common cryoprotectant permeation into rice callus by CARS microscopy." This article was about how cryoprotectants work with cells. Cryoprotectants are proteins that help keep cells from freezing when it gets cold. This article also discusses cellular response when temperatures begin to drop.
