= Nancy Rodriguez =

Nancy Rodriguez may refer to:

- Nancy Rodriguez (politician) (born 1953), American politician
- Nancy Rodriguez (criminologist) (born 1970), American criminologist and professor

== See also ==
- Nancy Rodrigues, Virginia politician
