= Nancy Baker =

Nancy Baker may refer to:

- Nancy Landon Kassebaum Baker, known as Nancy Kassebaum (1932–2026), American politician
- Nancy Baker Cahill (born 1970), American new media artist
- Nancy Baker Tompkins, American businesswoman
