= Nancy Bates =

Nancy Bates may refer to:

- Nancy Bates (journalist) (born 1948), New Zealand-born Australian community advocate and retired journalist
- Nancy Bates (singer), Australian singer-songwriter, 2025 Adelaide Fringe Ambassador
- Nancy Bates (statistician), American statistician
