= Nancy Tang =

Nancy Tang is the name of:

- Tang Wensheng (born 1943), US-born Chinese diplomat
- Nancy T. Chang (born 1950), Taiwanese-American biochemist
