= Nancy E. Dunlap =

Physician, researcher and business administrator

Nancy E. Dunlap, MD, PhD, MBA
- Education: Duke University School of Medicine
- Known for: Dean UVA School of Medicine (2013-14), Professor of Pulmonary Medicine, House Committee on Energy and Commerce
- Website: University of Alabama at Birmingham

Nancy E. Dunlap is a physician, researcher and business administrator focused in the area of pulmonary and critical care medicine. She is now an emeritus professor at the University of Alabama at Birmingham School of Medicine.

== Career ==
Dunlap has held numerous appointments with increasing responsibilities at the University of Alabama at Birmingham, as professor of medicine and business. She also served as vice chair for clinical affairs, vice president of the UAB Health System for Ambulatory Services and chief of staff and chief operating officer for The Kirklin Clinic, a large, multi-specialty, academic clinic.

As a Robert Wood Johnson Health Policy Fellow, Dunlap worked on the reauthorization of FDA legislation regarding pharmaceuticals, medical devices, biologics, as well as issues related to Medicare, Medicaid, public health, insurance matters, sustainable growth rate and medical liability.

Dr. Dunlap was also a Physician-in-Residence with the National Governors Association in Washington, DC in 2013.

In May 2013, Dunlap was appointed interim Dean for the University of Virginia School of Medicine, replacing Steven T. DeKosky, and served a term of eighteen months.

Dunlap received a bachelor of arts degree from Wellesley College; a medical degree from Duke University; a doctoral degree in microbiology from UAB; and an MBA degree with distinction from the University of Michigan at Ann Arbor.

== Publications ==
Dr. Dunlap is cited as an author on over 45 PubMed publications.

== Board certifications ==
- 1984, American Board of Internal Medicine
- 1988, American Board of Internal Medicine, Pulmonary Diseases
- 1989, 1999, 2009, American Board of Internal Medicine, Critical Care Medicine

== Education ==
- Medical School: Duke University Medical School, Durham, NC,
- Internship: University of Alabama – Birmingham, 1981–1982
- Residency: University of Alabama – Birmingham, 1982–1984
- Fellowship: University of Alabama – Birmingham, 1984–1987
- Doctorate: University of Alabama at Birmingham, Birmingham, AL, Ph.D., Microbiology, 1991
- Masters: University of Michigan, Ann Arbor, MI, M.B.A., Business, With Distinction
