= Nancy Wood =

Nancy Wood may refer to:

- Nancy Wood (journalist), Canadian television journalist
- Nancy Wood (author) (1936–2013), American author, poet, and photographer
- Nancy Farley Wood (1903–2003), American physicist, businesswoman, and member of the Manhattan Project
