= Nancy Russo =

American psychologist

- Born: May 3, 1943 (age 83); Oroville, California
- Education: University of California, Davis; Cornell University
- Relatives: Lucio F. Russo (father-in-law)
- Scientific career
- Fields: Psychology
- Workplaces: Arizona State University
- Notable students: Hortensia Amaro

Nancy Felipe Russo (born May 3, 1943) is an American psychologist and Regents Professor Emerita in the Department of Psychology at Arizona State University. She has received media attention for her research on the psychological effects of abortion.

Russo was born in Oroville, California and graduated from Oroville High School in 1961. She received her bachelor's degree from the University of California, Davis before earning her Ph.D. from Cornell University in 1970. After working at the City University of New York's Richmond College and the American Psychological Association, she joined the faculty of Arizona State University, where she taught from 1985 until retiring in 2010. In 1996, she received the ward for Distinguished Contribution to Psychology in the Public Interest from the American Psychological Association.
