= Nancy Kelley =

British lawyer and human rights advocate

- Born: February 1973 (age 52)
- Occupations: Lawyer and CEO
- Children: 2

Nancy Kelley (born February 1973) is a British lawyer, policy adviser and human rights advocate who served as the chief executive officer of Stonewall from May 2020 until July 2023.

== Career ==
She holds degrees in English and literature from the University of Bristol and the University of Cambridge, and a first class honours degree in law from Birkbeck, University of London. She has worked in the policy and advocacy sector since the early 2000s, and was an advocacy legal advisor at Mind, a programme director at the Children's Rights Commissioner for London, a Principal Policy Officer at Barnardo's, Head of UK and International Policy at the British Refugee Council, Deputy Director of Policy and Research at the Joseph Rowntree Foundation, a civil servant with the Department for Work and Pensions, chief executive of Media for Development, and Deputy Chief Executive of the National Centre for Social Research prior to her appointment as CEO of Stonewall in 2020.

== Personal life ==
Kelley lives in east London with her civil partner and their two children.
