= Nancy Adam =

Scottish trade union official

Woman Officer of the Trades Union Congress
- In office 1922–1951
- Succeeded by: Margaret McKay

Personal details
- Born: February 23, 1888 Glasgow, Scotland, U.K.
- Died: May 6, 1982 (aged 94)
- Education: Ruskin College
- Occupation: Trade union official

Nancy Adam (23 Feb 1888 – 6 May 1982) was a Scottish trade union official who served as the first woman officer of the Trades Union Congress (TUC).

== Life ==
Born in Glasgow, Adam became involved in the trade union movement at an early age. She worked as an organiser for the National Federation of Women Workers, under Mary Macarthur. She left the federation to study at Ruskin College for two years, after which she found work as the secretary to James Maxton, a prominent Labour Party Member of Parliament. After some time working for him and also for Tom Dickson, she moved to the Miners' Federation of Great Britain, where she was the personal secretary to General Secretary A. J. Cook for eight years.

In 1932, Adam began working for the TUC as the secretary of its Women's National Advisory Committee. She became known as the organisation's first woman officer, and remained in the post until her retirement in 1951.

Adam was made a Member of the Order of the British Empire in 1945. She died at the age of 94, in 1982.

Trade union offices
Preceded by New position	Woman Officer of the Trades Union Congress; 1932–1951	Succeeded by Margaret McKay
