= Nancy Riche =

Nancy Riche may refer to:

- The former president of the New Democratic Party
- A victim of the Our Lady of the Angels School Fire who died in Room 208
