= Nancy Elizabeth Wallace =

American children's book author and illustrator (born 1948)

- Born: May 16, 1948 (age 78); New York City, New York, U.S.
- Education: University of Connecticut
- Known for: Illustrations

Nancy Elizabeth Wallace is an American children's book author and illustrator. She uses cut paper for many of her illustrations.

== Biography ==
Wallace was born in 1948 in New York City to Alexine and John Wallace. She attended the University of Connecticut, graduating with a B.A. and later an M.A. in child development. She worked at the Yale-New Haven Hospital in New Haven, Connecticut, where she worked with children. After she left her job at the hospital, she began learning Scherenschnitte, the art of traditional paper cutting.

Her first children's book, Snow, was published in 1995 by Golden Books. The book uses colorful cut-paper collage and follows the story of a family of rabbits. The New York Times reviewed the book in 1999, stating, "The strength of this gentle book is the way it captures the quiet magic and cozy charm of a cold, snowy day with loved ones."

Wallace created and illustrated the 2005 ABC book Alphabet House. The book contains no words and is used as an "I spy" game, where readers are tasked to find objects on each page that match to a corresponding letter of the alphabet.

Along with Nadine Lipman and Caitlin Augusta of Stratford Library in Connecticut, Wallace launched the annual Take Your Child to the Library Day in 2012.

== Books ==
- Snow (1995)
- Look! Look! Look!
- Seeds! Seeds! Seeds!
- Paperwhite (2000)
- Apples, Apples, Apples (2000)
- Count Down to Clean Up! (2001)
- Leaves! Leaves! Leaves! (2003)
- The Valentine Express (2004)
- Alphabet House (2005)
- The Kindness Quilt (2006)
- Shells! Shells! Shells! (2007)
- Pond Walk (2011)
- Look! Look! Look! At Sculpture (2012)
- Water! Water! Water! (2014)
