= Annika =

Female given name

Annika is a feminine given name with multiple origins in different cultures. It is a Swedish diminutive for Anna, derived in the 15th century from Anneke, a Dutch and Northern Germanic diminutive of Anna. Swedish-born retired professional golfer Annika Sörenstam is a well-known bearer of the name.

It is also a name that was in use for Black women in the mid- to late 1800s in the United States, according to census records. Professor Cleveland Evans notes that it is unlikely that newly freed slaves were using a name of Swedish origin, and he suggests that the name as used by them might be a short form of another name such as Angelica or a combination of other names such as Anna and Monica, with a slight chance of an African origin. Anika is a spelling variant.

It is also common in Germany, Hungary, Finland and Estonia as well as in Sweden, gaining popularity after 1969 from the character of that name in the Pippi Longstocking TV series, film and book. Star Trek character Seven of Nine, whose name at birth was Annika Hansen, has also raised the profile of the name since the 1990s.

In Hungary, Anika or Ani is a nick of Anna.

== Women ==
- Annika Beck (born 1994), German tennis player
- Annika Belshaw (born 2002), American ski jumper
- Annika Bryn (born 1945), Swedish author and freelance journalist
- Annika Chambers (born 1985), American singer
- Annika Drazek (born 1995), German bobsledder and track and field athlete
- Annika Duckmark (born 1971), Swedish television presenter
- Annika Ernst (born 1982), German actress
- Annika Fohn (born 1987), German politician
- Annika Fredén (born 1978), Swedish handball player
- Annika Hagström (born 1942), Swedish journalist
- Annika Hallin (born 1968), Swedish actress
- Annika Herlitz (born 1984), Swedish singer
- Annika Hocke (born 2000), German skater
- Annika Hoydal (born 1945), Faroese singer
- Annika Idström (1947–2011), Finnish writer
- Annika Kipp (born 1979), German television presenter
- Annika Kjærgaard (born 1971), Swedish singer
- Annika Langvad (born 1984), Danish cross-country mountain biker
- Annika Larsson (born 1972), Swedish photographer
- Annika Lemström (born 1964), Finnish sailor
- Annika Marks, American actress
- Annika Mombauer (born 1967), British academic and historian
- Annika Morgan (born 2002), German snowboarder
- Annika Noelle (born 1986), American actress and model
- Annika Norlin (born 1977), Swedish pop artist and journalist
- Annika Östberg (born 1954), Swedish convicted murderer
- Annika Paz (born 2008), Argentine football player
- Annika Penickova (born 2009), American tennis player
- Annika Reeder (born 1979), British artistic gymnast
- Annika Saarikko (born 1983), Finnish politician
- Annika Saarnak (born 1988), Estonian swimmer
- Annika Sieff (born 2003), Italian ski jumper
- Annika Sörenstam (born 1970), Swedish professional golfer
- Annika Ström (born 1964), Swedish artist
- Annika Svahn (fl. 1714), Finnish dragoon
- Annika Tammela (1979–2001), Estonian footballer
- Annika Taylor (born 1993), British cross-country skier
- Annika Thor (born 1950), Swedish author
- Annika Uvehall (born 1965), Swedish Olympic swimmer
- Annika Viilo (born 1965), Finnish orienteer
- Annika Wedderkopp (born 2004), Danish singer and actress
- Annika Wells (born 1996), American singer
- Annika Wickihalder (born 2001), Swedish singer
- Annika Zeyen (born 1985), German wheelchair basketball player

== Fictional characters ==
- Annika Attwater, in the TV series You
- Annika Bengtzon, fictional journalist in a novel series by Liza Marklund
- Annika Hansen, birth name of Seven of Nine, in the Star Trek: Voyager TV series
- Annika Sellberg, protagonist of the 1984 miniseries Annika
- Annika Settergren, in the novel Pippi Longstocking
- Annika Stormare, an identity assumed by the protagonist of Codename: Annika, a 2023 Finnish-Swedish TV series
- Annika Strandhed, protagonist of the 2021 British TV series Annika
- Princess Annika, in Barbie and the Magic of Pegasus
- Agent Annika, in American Assassin

== See also ==
- Anika, spelling variant
- Anike (rapper)
