= Östberg =

Östberg is a Swedish topographic surname, which means "east mountain" or "east hill", from the Swedish terms öst ("east") and berg ("mountain" or "hill"). Alternative spellings include Østberg and Ostberg. The surname may refer to:

- Annika Östberg (born 1954), Swedish convict
- Carolina Östberg (1853–1929), Swedish singer
- Cecilia Östberg (born 1991), Swedish ice hockey player
- Curt Östberg (1905–1969), Swedish tennis player
- Frida Östberg (born 1977), Swedish footballer
- Gunnar Östberg (1923–2017), Swedish cross-country skier
- Ingvild Flugstad Østberg (born 1990), Norwegian cross-country skier
- Ivar Østberg (born 1942), Norwegian politician
- Mads Østberg (born 1987), Norwegian rally driver
- Mattias Östberg (born 1977), Swedish footballer
- Moje Östberg (1897–1984), Swedish Navy rear admiral
- Olov Östberg, Swedish researcher
- Ragnar Östberg (1866–1945), Swedish architect
