= List of shipwrecks in November 1880 =

The list of shipwrecks in November 1880 includes ships sunk, foundered, grounded, or otherwise lost during November 1880.

== 1 November ==
List of shipwrecks: 1 November 1880
Ship	State	Description
Albertus	Germany	The schooner was abandoned in the North Sea 60 nautical miles (110 km) off Lowestoft, Suffolk, United Kingdom. Her crew were rescued by the smack Theodosius (United Kingdom). Albertus was on a voyage from Charleston, South Carolina, United States to Husum.
Alfred and Emma	United Kingdom	The ship struck the breakwater at Wick, Caithness. Her crew were rescued.
Aratus	United Kingdom	The brigantine was discovered by the steamship Harold (United Kingdom) and was towed in to Cork in a derelict condition. Aratus was on a voyage from Teignmouth, Devon to Liverpool, Lancashire.
Betsey	(United Kingdom of Great Britain and Ireland) Isle of Man	The ship ran aground in Liverpool Bay.
Bicton	United Kingdom	The steamship ran aground on the Krantzand, in the Elbe.
Brackenholm	United Kingdom	The schooner was run into by the steamship Meredith (United Kingdom) at Gravesend, Kent and was severely damaged.
Bratsberg	Denmark	The barque was abandoned in the North Sea. Her crew were rescued by the fishing smack Kate (United Kingdom). Bratsberg was on a voyage from London, United Kingdom to Skien.
Catherina Lutgerdina	Netherlands	The schooner was driven ashore and wrecked at Hjørring, Denmark. Her crew were rescued.
Clan Ranald	United Kingdom	The steamship was damaged by fire and sank at Port Said, Egypt. She was refloated in late November.
Diamond	United Kingdom	The steamship was driven ashore on Anholt, Denmark. There were at least seven survivors. She was on a voyage from Burntisland, Fife to Copenhagen. She broke in two on 8 November.
Helios	Norway	The brig was driven ashore at "Friborg". She was on a voyage from Vyborg, Grand Duchy of Finland to a French port.
Joanchas	Norway	The ship ran aground at Kirkcaldy, Fife, United Kingdom. She was on a voyage from Sandefjord to Kirkcaldy.
John Bladworth	United Kingdom	The steamship ran aground at Terneuzen, Zeeland, Netherlands. She was on a voyage from Goole, Yorkshire to Ghent, East Flanders, Belgium. She was refloated the next day and taken in to Terneuzen.
Maria Wohlfahrt	Germany	The ship was driven ashore and wrecked 1.5 versts (1.16 nautical miles (2.14 km)) west of Riga, Russia, Her crew were rescued.
Marsilia	France	The steamship ran aground and sank off Cape Palos, Spain. Her crew were rescued. She was on a voyage from Oran, Algeria to Cette, Hérault.
Rescue	United Kingdom	The schooner was driven ashore on Møn, Denmark. She was on a voyage from Saint Petersburg, Russia to a British port.
Sarah Ann	(United Kingdom of Great Britain and Ireland) Guernsey	The ship was abandoned at sea. Her crew were rescued by the barque Onward (United Kingdom). Sarah Ann was on a voyage from Guernsey to Runcorn, Cheshire.
Saxon	United Kingdom	The schooner was driven ashore at Zierikzee, North Holland, Netherlands.
Skandia	Norway	The brig was discovered in a sinking condition in the North Sea by the barque Cito (Norway), which was unable to rescue her crew. Cito lost sight of Skandia at nightfall.
Taffarette	France	The barque was wrecked at Hai'an, China. Her crew were rescued.
Vingolf	Norway	The barque was abandoned off the Horn Reef, in the Baltic Sea. Six crew were rescued by the barque Kotus ( (Russian Empire) Grand Duchy of Finland), which had to leave five of her crew on board Kotus as the boats they were using were destroyed.
Zwantje	Netherlands	The kuff was driven ashore and wrecked at Larvik, Norway. She was on a voyage from Helsinki, Grand Duchy of Finland to Schiedam, South Holland.

== 2 November ==
List of shipwrecks: 2 November 1880
Ship	State	Description
Albert	Germany	The brigantine was abandoned in the North Sea, leaking, and presumed foundered. Her crew were rescued by the fishing smack Gladiator (United Kingdom). Albert was on a voyage from Fowey, Cornwall to Stettin, Germany. (Newspapers also reported name as Alward, later corrected by some.)
Alida	Netherlands	The kuff was driven ashore and wrecked at Thisted, Denmark.
Bedlormie	United Kingdom	The steamship ran aground at Fjord, Norway. She was on a voyage from Middlesbrough, Yorkshire to Flensburg, Germany. She was refloated on 8 November and taken in to Flensburg.
Blitz	Germany	The steamship struck the pier at Kolberg, was driven ashore and wrecked. She was on a voyage from Kolberg to Stettin.
City of Agra, and Nepthis	United Kingdom	The steamship Nepthis ran into the steamship City of Agra at Liverpool, Lancashire. Both vessels were severely damaged. City of Agra was on a voyage from London to Liverpool. Nepthis was on a voyage from Odesa, Russia to Liverpool. Both vessels were taken in to Liverpool
Dinorwic	United Kingdom	The schooner was driven ashore at Westerplatte, Germany. She was on a voyage from Tornio, Grand Duchy of Finland to Aberdovey, Merionethshire.
Fanny	Norway	The barque capsized at Falmouth, Cornwall, United Kingdom and was severely damaged. She was on a voyage from Liverpool to a Norwegian port.
Fortuna	Norway	The brig ran aground at Dragør, Denmark. She was on a voyage from Skutskär, Sweden to Rouen, Seine-Inférieure, France. She was refloated and taken in to Copenhagen, Denmark in a severely damaged condition.
Lisette	Germany	The schooner was driven ashore west of Swinemünde. She was on a voyage from Reval, Russia to Hull, Yorkshire, United Kingdom.
Perle	Germany	The brig was driven ashore at Copenhagen.
Pinta	United Kingdom	The schooner, which had been ashore, was beached at Whitstable, Kent as she was severely leaky.
Tamana	United Kingdom	The barque caught fire on 2 November off the coast of the Aceh Sultanate, Sumatra, on a voyage from Greenock to Singapore with coal. She was abandoned afloat on 5 November, and her crew taken aboard the man-of-war Curacoa (Royal Netherlands Navy). Tamana, drifting on fire, was picked up by the steamer Devonhurst (United Kingdom) and put ashore at Olehleh, where she burned out.
Thomas	United Kingdom	The schooner collided with the Woodside Landing Stage and was severely damaged. She was beached at Tranmere, Cheshire.
Tyr	Sweden	The schooner was driven ashore. She was on a voyage from Rouen, Seine-Inférieure to Trondheim, Norway. She was refloated and put in to Havre de Grâce, Seine-Inférieure.

== 3 November ==
List of shipwrecks: 3 November 1880
Ship	State	Description
Adelina	(United Kingdom of Great Britain and Ireland) Jersey	The schooner, which had been on a voyage from Blanc-Sablon, Quebec, Canada to the Strait of Belle Isle, was discovered derelict by Assyrian Canada, which put some of her crew on board. They took Adelina in to Queenstown, County Cork.
Alert	Germany	The steamship ran aground at Trelleborg, Sweden. She was on a voyage from Hamburg to Reval, Russia. She was refloated and taken in to Copenhagen, Denmark.
Aurora	Denmark	The schooner collided with the brig Broderschap (Netherlands) and foundered in the North Sea. Her crew were rescued. Aurora was on a voyage from an English port to Odense.
Elizabeth	Denmark	The schooner was driven ashore at Gudhjem, Bornholm. She was on a voyage from Reval to Gothenburg, Sweden.
Florist	United Kingdom	The ship sank at Port-en-Bessin, Calvados, France. She was declared a total loss.
Margaret Hain	United Kingdom	The ship was driven ashore at "Catacola", Greece. She was refloated and resumed her voyage.
Mercury	United Kingdom	The steamship foundered off Ouessant, Finistère with the loss of six of the seventeen people on board. Survivors were rescued by the steamship Iberia (United Kingdom). Mercury was on a voyage from Youghal, County Cork to Bordeaux, Gironde, France.
Midelven	Norway	The brig ran aground in Køge Bay. She was on a voyage from Skutskär, Sweden to Dieppe, Seine-Inférieure, France. She was refloated and taken in to Copenhagen, Denmark in a leaky condition.
Nimrod	United Kingdom	The yacht was wrecked at Zierikzee, North Holland, Netherlands. Her crew were rescued. She was on a voyage from Dieppe to Dordrecht, South Holland, Netherlands.
Ottilie	Germany	The barque caught fire and was abandoned in the North Sea. She was discovered derelict by the smack Francis Scott (United Kingdom), which towed her in to Hull, Yorkshire, United Kingdom.
Scindian	United Kingdom	The convict ship sank in the Tyrrhenian Sea off Rio Marina, Elba, Italy, with the loss of six lives. Eight people were rescued.
Syster	Sweden	The ship was towed in to Great Yarmouth, Norfolk, United Kingdom in a derelict condition. She was on a voyage from Sundsvall to Cardiff, Glamorgan, United Kingdom.

== 4 November ==
List of shipwrecks: 4 November 1880
Ship	State	Description
Alice James	United Kingdom	The schooner was abandoned off Cherbourg, Manche, France. She was on a voyage from Cardiff, Glamorgan to Honfleur, Manche. She was towed in to Cherbourg.
Berlin	United Kingdom	The barque sprang a leak and was beached at Great Yarmouth, Norfolk. She was on a voyage from Aberystwyth, Cardiganshire to Newcastle upon Tyne, Northumberland.
Catherina II	Russia	The steamship was driven ashore at Kastrup, Denmark. She was refloated with assistance the next day and taken in to Copenhagen, Denmark.
Columbine	United Kingdom	The steamship was driven ashore at Hittarp, Denmark. She was on a voyage from Middlesbrough, Yorkshire to Stettin, Germany. She was refloated with assistance on 6 November.
Comte de Hainaut	Belgium	The steamship ran aground at Bordeaux, Gironde, France. She was on a voyage from Antwerp to Bordeaux.
Fitzjames	United Kingdom	The steamship ran aground on the Scullmartin Rock, off the coast of County Down. She was on a voyage from Glasgow, Renfrewshire to Genoa, Italy. She was refloated on 7 November and towed in to Drogheda, County Louth.
Harlequin, and Mathilde	United Kingdom; Germany	The steamship Harlequin collided with the schooner Mathilde and sank in the Baltic Sea. Her crew were rescued by the steamship Gibraltar (Sweden). Harlequin was on a voyage from South Shields, County Durham to Königsberg. Mathilde was on a voyage from Memel to Hull, Yorkshire. She put in to Dragør, Denmark in a leaky condition.
Niord	Flag unknown	The abandoned schooner was towed in to Copenhagen, Denmark by the steamship Wilhelm (Germany).
Prima	Norway	The barque ran aground on the Middelgrunden. She was on a voyage from Kramfors, Sweden to Antwerp, Belgium. She was refloated and put in to Copenhagen.
Saga	United Kingdom	The steamship ran aground at Pärnu, Russia.
Sidon	United Kingdom	The steamship ran aground at Hannon's Point, Ottoman Empire. She was refloated on 6 November with assistance from the steamship Retriever (Ottoman Empire) and taken in to Gallipoli.
Twee Gezusters	Flag unknown	The ship sank in the North Sea 30 nautical miles (56 km) north east of Dunkirk, Nord. France.

== 5 November ==
List of shipwrecks: 5 November 1880
Ship	State	Description
Alrune	United Kingdom	The steamship was driven ashore and wrecked at Porkkalainnen, Grand Duchy of Finland. She was on a voyage from Kronstadt, Russia to Rotterdam, South Holland, Netherlands.
Boudish	United Kingdom	The schooner was driven ashore on Læsø, Denmark. She was on a voyage from Memel, Germany to Leith, Lothian.
Dolores	United Kingdom	The ship ran aground in the West Burra Firth, Shetland Islands and was wrecked.
Falcon	United Kingdom	The steamship ran aground on the Barnard Sand, in the North Sea off the coast of Suffolk. She was on a voyage from Rotterdam to Kingston upon Hull, Yorkshire. She was refloated.
Goudvisch	Flag unknown	The schooner was driven ashore on Læsø, Denmark. She was on a voyage from Klaipėda, Germany to Leith, Lothian, United Kingdom.
Henry Palmer	United Kingdom	The ship departed from Quebec City, Canada for Swansea, Glamorgan. No further trace, reported missing.
Jupiter	France	The lighter sank in the Gironde. She was on a voyage from Pauillac to Bordeaux, Gironde.
Leopold	France	The steamship sank at Le Conquet, Finistère. She was on a voyage from Cardiff, Glamorgan, United Kingdom to Roscoff, Finistère. She was refloated.
Marie	Sweden	The schooner was driven ashore and wrecked at Tolbøl, Denmark. Her crew were rescued. She was on a voyage from Hartlepool, County Durham, United Kingdom to Trellebørg.
Pilot	United Kingdom	The steamship collided with the steamship Mangerton (United Kingdom) and sank in the River Thames at Gravesend, Kent. Her crew were rescued. Pilot was on a voyage from Newcastle upon Tyne, Northumberland to London. She was refloated on 11 November and beached.
Princess	Denmark	The schooner was driven ashore on Skagen. She was on a voyage from Charlestown, Cornwall, United Kingdom to Korsør.
Riversdale	United Kingdom	The steamship ran aground in the Bristol Channel off the coast of Somerset. She was on a voyage from Baltimore, Maryland, United States to Avonmouth, Somerset. She was refloated and taken in to Avonmouth.
Topaz	United Kingdom	The steamship caught fire at sea. She was on a voyage from New Orleans, Louisiana, United States to Havre de Grâce, Seine-Inférieure, France. The fire had been extinguished by 7 November.
Von Haydon	Germany	The brig foundered in the North Sea. Her crew were rescued by the smack Prince Charlie (United Kingdom). Von Heydon was on a voyage from Liverpool, Lancashire, United Kingdom to Memel.
Unnamed	Spain	The felucca was run down and sunk by the steamship Goa (United Kingdom). Her crew were rescued.

== 6 November ==
List of shipwrecks: 6 November 1880
Ship	State	Description
Adolphe	France	The ship struck a rock off the coast of Chile and was wrecked. Her crew were rescued. She was on a voyage from Bordeaux, Gironde to Valparaíso, Chile.
Barent	Netherlands	The ship ran aground on the Anholt Reef, in the Baltic Sea.
Carlo	United Kingdom	The steamship ran aground in the Danube downstream of Gorgova, United Principalities.
Clara	United States	The barque was driven ashore and wrecked at Port Elizabeth, Cape Colony.
Columba	Russia	The ship was wrecked at East London, Cape Colony. Her crew survived.
Emily Burnyeat	United Kingdom	The brigantine ran aground on the Winterton Ridge, in the North Sea off the coast of Norfolk. She was on a voyage from Newcastle upon Tyne, Northumberland to Limerick. She was refloated and towed in to Great Yarmouth, Norfolk in a leaky condition.
Hendrika Grietje Almina	Germany	The schooner was driven ashore at Hela. She was reported to have been on a voyage from Saint Petersburg to Kronstadt, Russia. She was refloated and taken in to Danzig in a leaky condition.
Hope	United Kingdom	The ship was wrecked at East London. Her crew survived.
John	Russia	The schooner was run into by the steamship Emerald (United Kingdom) and was driven into the schooner Christopher (Denmark) in the River Mersey. She was consequently beached.
Lady Pryce	United Kingdom	The ship was wrecked in Mossel Bay. Her crew were rescued. She was on a voyage from London to Mossel Bay.
Marie	Sweden	The schooner was driven ashore and wrecked at Thisted, Denmark. She was on a voyage from Hartlepool, County Durham to Trelleborg.
Mary Ellis	United Kingdom	The ship ran aground on the Goodwin Sands, Kent. She was on a voyage from Seaham, County Durham to Portsmouth, Hampshire. She was refloated and taken in to Ramsgate, Kent in a leaky condition.
Progress, and an unnamed vessel	United Kingdom	A sloop was run down and sunk by the steamship Progress, which was severely damaged at the bow. Progress put in to Bristol, Gloucestershire.
Regulator	United Kingdom	The brig ran aground on the Estreito. She was on a voyage from the Rio Grande to Portog Alegre, Brazil. She was refloated.
Rhode Island	United States	The passenger ship, a sidewheel paddle steamer, was wrecked on rocks in Narragansett Bay 200 feet (61 m) off Bonnet Point, Narragansett, Rhode Island. Her wreck settled in 10 to 20 feet (3.0 to 6.1 m) of water at 41°28′12″N 071°25′06″W. Her steam engine, boiler, and most of her cargo were salvaged soon afterwards.
Starbeam	United Kingdom	The ship was wrecked at East London. Her crew survived.
Swan	United Kingdom	The steamship ran aground on the Haisborough Sands, in the North Sea off the coast of Norfolk. Her sixteen crew were rescued by the Caister Lifeboat. She was on a voyage from Bilbao, Spain to Newcastle upon Tyne. She was refloated and towed in to Harwich, Essex with the assistance of two tugs and two lifeboats.
Unity	United Kingdom	The ship ran aground at Bideford, Devon. She was on a voyage from Porthcawl, Glamorgan to Bideford.
Zealand	Canada	The steamship departed from Ottawa, Ontario for Montreal, Quebec. Presumed foundered with the loss of all sixteen crew. Wreckage from the ship washed ashore.

== 7 November ==
List of shipwrecks: 7 November 1880
Ship	State	Description
Ardoe	United Kingdom	The steamship caught fire at Rotherhithe, Surrey. The fire was extinguished, but she was severely damaged aft.
Arnevig	Sweden	The ship was lost. She was on a voyageb from Fécamp, Seine-Inférieure, France to Gothenburg.
Beata	Sweden	The capsized ship was discovered in the North Sea. She was beached at Horsey, Norfolk, United Kingdom.
Betty Storrer	United States	The ship was abandoned in the Atlantic Ocean. Her crew were rescued by Cosilda (United Kingdom). Betty Storrer was on a voyage from Antwerp, Belgium to New York.
Gannet	United Kingdom	The steamship ran aground at Maassluis, South Holland, Netherlands. She was on a voyage from Kronstadt, Russia to Rotterdam, South Holland.
John	United Kingdom	The schooner was run into by the steamship Emerald (United Kingdom) at Sunderland, County Durham. Both vessels then collided with the schooner Christopher (Denmark). John became leaky and was consequently beached.
Kingston	United Kingdom	The steamship put in to São Miguel Island, Azores on fire. She was on a voyage from Savannah, Georgia, United States to Liverpool, Lancashire. The fire was extinguished but she was severely damaged.
Melida	Germany	The steamship departed from Stettin for Riga, Russia. No further trace, reported missing.
Neptune	United Kingdom	The steamship ran aground on the Mantles Rocks. She was on a voyage from Galway to Glasgow, Renfrewshire. She was refloated, found to be severely leaky and was beached. She was refloated and taken in to Galway for temporary repairs.
Rokeby	United Kingdom	The steamship ran aground at Port Saind, Egypt. She was on a voyage from Cardiff, Glamorgan to Port Said. She was refloated and taken in to Port Said.
Samarang	United Kingdom	The ship collided with the steamship Germanic (United Kingdom off Sandy Hook, New Jersey United States and was beached. Samarang was on a voytage from New York, United States to Sharpness, Gloucestershire.
Sandringham	United Kingdom	The steamship was driven ashore at Cape Henry, Virginia, United States. She was on a voyage from Galveston, Texas, United States to Glasgow, Renfrewshire. She was refloated and taken in to Norfolk, Virginia.
Savoir Faire	United Kingdom	The ship was driven ashore in the River Mersey between Monks Ferry and Tranmere, Cheshire. She was on a voyage from Liverpool to Calcutta, India. She was refloated and resumed her voyage.

== 8 November ==
List of shipwrecks: 8 November 1880
Ship	State	Description
Ada	United Kingdom	The schooner was driven ashore at Cleveleys, Lancashire. Her four crew having previously been taken off by the Ramsey Lifeboat.
Alida	Netherlands	The kuff was driven ashore on Texel, North Holland. She was on a voyage from Newcastle upon Tyne, Northumberland, United Kingdom to Harlingen, Friesland. She was refloated on 12 November.
Anna	United Kingdom	The abandoned schooner was towed in to Ostend, West Flanders, Belgium.
Caros	United Kingdom	The brig was driven ashore and wrecked on Lady Isle, in the Firth of Clyde. She was on a voyage from Troon, Ayrshire to Belfast, County Antrim.
Drama	Austria-Hungary	The barque was driven ashore at Port Natal, Natal Colony. Her crew were rescued.
Enterprise	France	The brig was driven ashore at Lyngby, Denmark. Her crew were rescued. She was on a voyage from Memel, Germany to Gothenburg, Sweden. She was a total loss.
Garnet	United Kingdom	The steamship ran aground at Maassluis, South Holland, Netherlands. She was on a voyage from Kronstadt, Russia to Rotterdam, South Holland. She was refloated.
Istlowen	Norway	The barque collided with another vessel and ran aground at Hasslö, Sweden. She was on a voyage from Porvoo, Grand Duchy of Finland to Berwick upon Tweed, Northumberland. She was refloated.
Lufra	Norway	The barque foundered in the Atlantic Ocean. Her eleven crew were rescued by the barquentine Guiseppe (Italy). Lufra was on a voyage from Bristol, Gloucestershire, United Kingdom to Wilmington, North Carolina, United States.
Majestas	United Kingdom	The ship was driven ashore at Merlimont, Pas-de-Calais, France. Her crew were rescued. She was on a voyage from Swansea, Glamorgan to Gravesend, Kent.
Melia	Norway	The brig was driven ashore and sank at Laurvig.
Neptune	Germany	The schooner was driven ashore and severely damaged west of Dunkirk, Nord, France.
Orvar Odd	Norway	The brig was towed in to Hull, Yorkshire, United Kingdom in a derelict condition.
Pampa	Italy	The steamship caught fire at Rio de Janeiro, Brazil. She was a total loss.
Silver Craig	United Kingdom	The barque was driven ashore and wrecked at Cabo Polonio, Uruguay. She was on a voyage from Liverpool, Lancashire to Montevideo, Uruguay. She was declared a total loss, but was subsequently towed in to Maldonado, Uruguay in a severely leaky condition.

== 9 November ==
List of shipwrecks: 9 November 1880
Ship	State	Description
Allida Antonia	Netherlands	The kuff was driven ashore at Nexø, Denmark. She was on a voyage from Libava, Courland Governorate to Schiedam, South Holland. She was a total loss.
Bell and Mary	United Kingdom	The schooner ran aground on the Barnhourie Bank, in the Water of Urr, and was wrecked. Her four crew survived. She was on a voyage from Maryport, Cumberland to Port William, Wigtownshire.
Eckersberg	Norway	The ship was abandoned off Sylt, Germany.
George	United Kingdom	The brig was wrecked 10 nautical miles (19 km) north west of Dénia, Spain with the loss of her captain from her five crew. She was on a voyage from Marseille, Bouches-du-Rhône, France to Montevideo, Uruguay.
Louisa Fletcher	United Kingdom	The ship ran aground in the Beloogyden Channel. She was refloated.
Luigia Raffo	Italy	The barque was towed in to Bône, Algeria in a sinking condition by the steamship Robert Ingham (United Kingdom). Luigia Raffo was on a voyage from Trapani, Sicily to Rangoon, Burma.
Maria Antoinetta	Netherlands	The ship was wrecked at Delfzijl, Groningen. She was on a voyage from Libava, Courland Governorate to Schiedam, South Holland.
Speculation	United Kingdom	The schooner was driven ashore north of the mouth of the River Eden, Fife.
Ulla	Norway	The ship was wrecked on Sylt, Germany.

== 10 November ==
List of shipwrecks: 10 November 1880
Ship	State	Description
Ballogie	United Kingdom	The steamship ran aground and lost her propeller. She was on a voyage from Kronstadt, Russia to Aberdeen. She was refloated and towed in to Copenhagen, Denmark.
Lady Darling	New South Wales	The steamship struck a rock and foundered. Her crew were rescued. She was on a voyage from Sydney to Newcastle.
Leading Star	United Kingdom	The ship was wrecked at the mouth of the Umzimkulu River. She was on a voyage from Christiania, Norway to Durban, Natal Colony.
Lively	United Kingdom	The brig foundered in the North Sea off Schouwen, Zeeland, Netherlands. Her crew were rescued by Belgian fishermen.
Louisa Ann Fanny	United Kingdom	The steamship was driven ashore and wrecked at Sandhammer, Norway with some loss of life. She was on a voyage from Riga, Russia to Liverpool, Lancashire.

== 11 November ==
List of shipwrecks: 11 November 1880
Ship	State	Description
Aleida Maria	Netherlands	The barque was driven ashore and wrecked at Lemvig, Denmark. She was on a voyage from Nyland, Sweden to the Nieuwe Diep.
Caedmon	United Kingdom	The steamship struck a submerged object at Dover, Kent and was severely damaged. She was on a voyage from Galaţi, United Principalities to Antwerp, Belgium. Temporary repairs were made before she resumed her voyage.
Formosa	United States	The ship was driven ashore in the Squan Inlet. She was on a voyage from New York to Charleston, South Carolina. She subsequently became a wreck.
Gloster	United Kingdom	The barque ran aground off Bornholm, Denmark. She was on a voyage from Vyborg, Grand Duchy of Finland to Gloucester. She was refloated and towed in to Copenhagen, Denmark in a leaky condition.
Johanna	Flag unknown	The schooner was driven ashore near Ventava, Courland Governorate.
Miramar	Austria-Hungary	The steamship ran aground on the Basile Rocks, near the Punta Bianchi Lighthouse. All on board were rescued. She was on a voyage from Ancona, Italy to Fiume. Attempts to refloat her failed and she was declared a total loss.
Name unknown	Flag unknown	The schooner ran aground on the Corton Sand, in the North Sea off the coast of Suffolk, United Kingdom.
Name unknown	Haiti	The lighter sank at Cap-Haïtien.

== 12 November ==
List of shipwrecks: 12 November 1880
Ship	State	Description
Cowslip	United Kingdom	The barque ran aground on the Carr Briggs, off the coast of Fife. She was refloated.
Edward Burton	United States	The ship was destroyed by fire at Gonaïves, Haiti. She was on a voyage from Boston, Massachusetts to Miragôane, Haiti.
Emma	France	The schooner was wrecked on the Tuskar Rock. Her crew were rescued.
Joseph Ricketts, and Libra	United Kingdom	The steamships collided in the River Thames at Northfleet, Kent and were severely damaged. Libra was on a voyage from Deptford, Kent to Hamburg. She put back to Deptford and was beached.
Linda	Russia	The barque was driven ashore at "Holmetunge", Denmark. She was on a voyage from Kotka, Grand Duchy of Finland to Bordeaux, Gironde. She was later refloated with assistance.
Mary Ellen	United Kingdom	The Mersey Flat sank in the River Mersey at Liverpool, Lancashire. Her crew were rescued.
Squale	(United Kingdom of Great Britain and Ireland) Guernsey	The schooner collided with the steamship Silesia (Germany) and sank in the English Channel 12 nautical miles (22 km) south of Beachy Head, Sussex. Her three crew survived. Squale was on a voyage from Saint-Malo, Ille-et-Vilaine, France to London.
Undaunted	(United Kingdom of Great Britain and Ireland) Guernsey	The brig was driven ashore on Heligoland. She was on a voyage from Curaçao, Curaçao and Dependencies to Hamburg. She was refloated with the assistance of a steamship but consequently foundered. Her crew were rescued.
Uno	Norway	The barque was driven ashore and severely damaged at Audresselles, Pas-de-Calais, France. She was on a voyage from New York, United States to Hamburg.

== 13 November ==
List of shipwrecks: 13 November 1880
Ship	State	Description
Alabama	Sweden	The barque was driven ashore at "Trosnas", Öland.
Balder	Germany	The steamship was driven ashore at "Dragenas", Sweden.
Carn Brea	United Kingdom	The barque was sighted off Dungeness, Kent whilst on a voyage from Newcastle upon Tyne, Northumberland to Belfast, County Antrim. No further trace,. reported missing.
Charlotte	(United Kingdom of Great Britain and Ireland) Jersey	The smack ran aground on the Mouse Sand, in the North Sea and was holed by her anchor. She was abandoned the next day and sank. She was on a voyage from Roscoff, Finistère, France to London.
Little Nell	United Kingdom	The schooner ran aground off Islandmagee, County Antrim. She was on a voyage from Liverpool, Lancashire to Newcastle upon Tyne. She was refloated on 15 November and resumed her voyage.
Squale	United Kingdom	The schooner collided with the steamship Silesia (Germany) and sank at Havre de Grâce, Seine-Inférieure, France. Squale was on a voyage from Saint-Malo, Ille-et-Vilaine, France to London.

== 14 November ==
List of shipwrecks: 14 November 1880
Ship	State	Description
Ada	United Kingdom	The ship sprang a leak and was driven ashore near Ramsey, Isle of Man. Her crew were rescued by the Ramsey Lifeboat. She was on a voyage from Ramsey to Runcorn, Cheshire.
Algitha	United Kingdom	Fire was discovered in the steamship's cotton cargo on 14 November while on a voyage from New Orleans, Louisiana, United States to Liverpool, Lancashire. She diverted to Saint John's, Newfoundland Colony, 500 nautical miles (930 km) away, arriving on 25 November. The fire was extinguished, and Algitha resumed her voyage on 7 December.
Ami	United Kingdom	The brig foundered in the North Sea off Goeree, Zeeland, Netherlands with the loss of all hands.
Blink Bonnie	United Kingdom	The schooner was driven ashore and wrecked at Macharioch, on the Mull of Kintyre, Argyllshire. Her crew survived. She was on a voyage from Irvine, Ayrshire to Londonderry.
Boston Packet	United Kingdom	The schooner was driven against the quayside and sank at Rosslare Harbour, County Wexford. She was on a voyage from Cardiff, Glamorgan to Rosslare Harbour.
Champion	United Kingdom	The barque was abandoned in the Atlantic Ocean (45°43′N 31°15′W). Her eighteen crew were rescued by the barque Eliza (Spain). Champion was on a voyage from Miramichi, New Brunswick, Canada to the Clyde.
Galatea	United Kingdom	The full-rigged ship foundered in the Atlantic Ocean 120 nautical miles (220 km) south west of Cape Clear Island, County Cork. Eight of her 29 crew managed to take to the lifeboat; they were rescued by the barque Brilliant (Norway). Galatea was on a voyage from Birkenhead, Cheshire to Bombay, India.
Sumatra	United Kingdom	The steamship ran aground at Brindisi, Italy avoiding a collision with the brig St. Catello (Italy). Sumatra was refloated with assistance from the ironclad Palestro (Regia Marina).

== 15 November ==
List of shipwrecks: 15 November 1880
Ship	State	Description
Aldborough	United Kingdom	The ship caught fire in the East India Docks, London and was severely damaged.
Agnes M. Gordon	United Kingdom	The schooner was driven ashore and wrecked at Cape Arkona, Rügen, Germany. Her crew were rescued. She was on a voyage from Stettin, Germany to Sunderland, County Durham.
Charlotte	United Kingdom	The yacht was driven ashore at Milford Haven, Pembrokeshire.
Constitution	Norway	The barque was driven ashore and wrecked at Betsiamis, Quebec, Canada.
Convenuti	Italy	The barque was driven ashore on Goeree, Zeeland, Netherlands and was wrecked. Her crew were rescued. She was on a voyage from Baltimore, Maryland, United States to Rotterdam, South Holland, Netherlands.
Dr. Kniep	Germany	The brig struck a sunken wreck off Domesnes, Courland Governorate. She was towed in to Riga, Russia in a waterlogged condition by the steamship Oscar (United Kingdom).
Eleanor	United Kingdom	The schooner foundered in the Irish Sea off Douglas, Isle of Man with the loss of all eight hands.
Elizabeth	(United Kingdom of Great Britain and Ireland) Isle of Man	The fishing smack was driven ashore and wrecked at Garlieston, Wigtownshire.
Francesco Picasso	Italy	The barque was driven ashore and wrecked at Batumi, Russia. Her crew were rescued. She was on a voyage from Poti, Russia to Liverpool, Lancashire, United Kingdom.
George and Francis	United Kingdom	The Thames barge was run into by the steamship John Johansson (Flag unknown) and sank in the River Thames at Gravesend, Kent.
George Brown	United Kingdom	The hopper barge was driven ashore at Milford Haven.
Hanna	Flag unknown	The brig ran aground at Porkkalanniemi, Grand Duchy of Finland. She was on a voygae from Bordeaux, Gironde, France to Helsinki, Grand Duchy of Finland.
Lübeck	Germany	The schooner foundered in the Baltic Sea with the loss of four of her crew.
Maurice Gautier	France	The schooner was driven ashore at the Point de Coubre, Charente-Inférieure, France.
Morecambe Belle	United Kingdom	The schooner foundered in the Irish Sea off Douglas with the loss of all eight hands.
Osprey	United Kingdom	The sloop was driven ashore and wrecked on Düne, Heligoland. Her crew were rescued. She was on a voyage from Poole, Dorset to Vegesack, Germany.
Queen	United Kingdom	The schooner was abandoned off Porthdinllaen, Caernarfonshire. Her three crew were rescued by the Porthdinllaen Lifeboat George Moore ( Royal National Lifeboat Institution). Queen was on a voyage from Newport, Monmouthshire to Caernarfon.
Seven Sisters	United Kingdom	The schooner was driven ashore and damaged at Milford Haven. She was on a voyage from Runcorn, Cheshire to Newcastle upon Tyne, Northumberland.
Stephenson	Germany	The ship was driven ashore at Emden. She was on a voyage from Riga, Russia to Termunterzijl, Groningen, Netherlands.
Sylph	United Kingdom	The sloop ran into the schooner Clara Felicia (United Kingdom) and sank off Great Yarmouth, Norfolk. Her crew were rescued. Sylph was on a voyage from Colchester, Essex to Goole, Yorkshire.
Three unnamed vessels	United Kingdom	The hopper barges were driven ashore at Milford Haven.

== 16 November ==
List of shipwrecks: 16 November 1880
Ship	State	Description
Aldebaran	United Kingdom	The ship was driven ashore at "Salvoret", Gotland, Sweden. She was on a voyage from Sundsvall, Sweden to Shoreham-by-Sea, Sussex.
Alfred	Germany	The barque was abandoned in the Atlantic Ocean. Her crew were rescued by Salacia (United Kingdom). Alfred was on a voyage from Richibucto, New Brunswick, Canada to Liverpool, Lancashire, United Kingdom.
Alfredo, and Foscolo	(Romania) United Principalities	The lighters collided in the Danube and both sank at the stern.
Alice	United Kingdom	The schooner ran aground on the Patch Sands, in the Bristol Channel. She was on a voyage from Newport, Monmouthshire to Bandon, County Cork. She was refloated and beached at Tenby, Pembrokeshire.
Brothers	United Kingdom	The brigantine foundered in the Irish Sea. Her crew were rescued. She was on a voyage from Liverpool to Dublin.
Edward	United Kingdom	The smack sank at Ilfracombe, Devon. Her crew were rescued by a gig.
Edgar Cecil	United Kingdom	The barque sprang a leak and was abandoned in the Atlantic Ocean. Her crew were rescued by the barque Carmela (Austria-Hungary). Edgar Cecil was on a voyage from Batavia, Netherlands East Indies to Montreal, Quebec, Canada.
Eldorado	United Kingdom	The ship sprang a leak off the Point of Ayre, Isle of Man. She was consequently beached at Donaghadee, County Antrim. She was on a voyage from Whitehaven, Cumberland to Belfast, County Antrim.
Elizabeth	(United Kingdom of Great Britain and Ireland) Isle of Man	The smack was driven ashore and wrecked on the Isle of Whithorn, Wigtownshire.
Fortune	United Kingdom	The brigantine ran aground at Lytham St. Annes, Lancashire and broke her back. She was on a voyage from Fleetwood, Lancashire to Belfast, County Antrim.
Glenavon	United Kingdom	The steamship was driven ashore at Portland, Dorset. She was on a voyage from Rouen, Seine-Inférieure, France to Cardiff, Glamorgan. She was refloated with assistance from the steamship Prince (United Kingdom) and taken in to Weymouth, Dorset.
Jane Butcher	United Kingdom	The brigantine was driven ashore at Dunvegan, Isle of Skye, Outer Hebrides. She was on a voyage from Kingstown, County Dublin to Newcastle upon Tyne, Northumberland.
John Austen	United Kingdom	The ship foundered off Jersey, Channel Islands.
Kingfisher	United Kingdom	The Thames barge capsized and sank in the River Thames at Barking, Essex. Her crew survived.
Little Nell	United Kingdom	The ship foundered south east of the Barra Head Lighthouse, Outer Hebrides. She was on a voyage from Runcorn, Cheshire to Newcastle upon Tyne, Northumberland.
Marshall	United Kingdom	The schooner ran aground at Thurso, Caithness and was run into by the schooner Barrowgill Castle (United Kingdom).
Queen of the Isles	United Kingdom	The schooner was abandoned in Porthdinllaen Bay. Her three crew were rescued by the Porthdinllaen Lifeboat George Moore ( Royal National Lifeboat Institution). Queen of the Isles was on a voyage from Newport, Monmouthshire to Caernarfon.
Ringdove	United Kingdom	The steamship ran aground on the Cross Sand, in the North Sea off the coast of Norfolk and sank with the loss of a crew member. Seventeen survivors were rescued by the Caister Lifeboat.
Rio de la Plata	Flag unknown	The ship was wrecked on the Île de Groix, Morbihan, France. Her crew were rescued. She was on a voyage from New York, United States to Rochefort, Charente-Inférieure, France.
Robert Bruce	United Kingdom	The tug foundered in the Bristol Channel off Nash Point, Glamorgan. Her crew were rescued by a pilot boat.
Speedwell	United Kingdom	The schooner ran aground on the Angus Rock, off the coast of County Down, United Kingdom. She was on a voyage from Liverpool to Londonderry.
Stockbridge	United Kingdom	The ship foundered off Queenstown, County Cork. Her 25 crew were rescued by the barque Monte Tabor (Italy). Stockbridge was on a voyage from Liverpool to Calcutta, India.
Trientje	Netherlands	The galiot was driven ashore and wrecked at Waren, Northumberland. Her crew were rescued. She was on a voyage from Rochester, Kent to Grangemouth, Stirlingshire, United Kingdom.
Ulloa	Spain	The steamship was damaged by fire at London, United Kingdom.
Unity	United Kingdom	The smack collided with the tug Earl of Windsor (United Kingdom) and sank off the Breaksea Lightship ( Trinity House). Her crew were rescued by Earl of Windsor. Unity was on a voyage from Penarth, Glamorgan to Barnstaple, Devon.
Viking	United Kingdom	The steamship was severely damaged by fire at Dublin.
Unnamed	Flag unknown	The schooner ran aground on the Scroby Sands, Norfolk.

== 17 November ==
List of shipwrecks: 17 November 1880
Ship	State	Description
Ailsa	United Kingdom	The steamship was wrecked at St. Govan's Head, Pembrokeshire with the loss of all 27 people on board. She was on a voyage from Bristol, Gloucestershire to Glasgow, Renfrewshire.
Bove	Norway	The schooner was driven ashore at Stornoway, Isle of Lewis, Outer Hebrides, United Kingdom. She was on a voyage from Whitehaven, Cumberland to Falmouth, Cornwall, United Kingdom. She was refloated with the assistance of the steamship Express (United Kingdom).
Industria	Portugal	The brig was wrecked on Terceira Island, Azores. Her crew were rescued.
Jessie	United Kingdom	The schooner was driven ashore at Fort William, Inverness-shire. She was on a voyage from Carrickfergus, County Antrim to Cockenzie, Fife.
Lord Sandon	Trinity House	The steamship ran aground on the Great Basses Reef, off the coast of Ceylon and sank.

== 18 November ==
List of shipwrecks: 18 November 1880
Ship	State	Description
Ägir (or Aegir)	Sweden	The schooner was driven ashore and wrecked in a gale off Björkö island, Gulf of Finland on a voyage to Kronstadt; the crew were saved.
Araby Maid	United Kingdom	The barque was driven ashore at Kingsdown, Kent with the loss of one life. Survivors were rescued by rocket apparatus. She was on a voyage from Gravesend, Kent to Otago, New Zealand. She was refloated with the assistance of a tug on 3 December.
Fides	Germany	The schooner was abandoned in the Atlantic Ocean. Her crew were rescued by the barque Fraternitas (Norway). Fides was on a voyage from Marseille, Bouches-du-Rhône, France to Bremen.
Emma	Germany	The brig was driven ashore at East London, Cape Colony. Her crew were rescued.
Heptarchy	United Kingdom	The steamship ran aground in the River Avon. She was on a voyage from Messina, Sicily, Italy to Bristol, Gloucestershire.
Louisa	United Kingdom	The ship was driven ashore at Sablonceaux, Charente-Inférieure, France. Her crew were rescued. She was on a voyage from Porthcawl, Glamorgan to Bordeaux, Gironde, France.
Opobo	Flag unknown	The steamship struck the Balaur Rock, off Bonny, Africa. She was taken in to Opobo Lagos Colony the next day and beached.

== 19 November ==
List of shipwrecks: 19 November 1880
Ship	State	Description
Anna Elise	Netherlands	The ship struck a sunken wreck and foundered 6 nautical miles (11 km) off the English coast. Her crew were rescued. She was on a voyage from Danzig, Germany to Brussels, West Flanders, Belgium.
Arklow	United Kingdom	The steamship ran aground on the Kimmeridge Ledge, in the English Channel off the coast of Dorset. All on board reached the shore. She was on a voyage from Glasgow, Renfrewshire to Southampton, Hampshire. She was declared a total loss.
Bee	United States	The boat was lost on Eastern Point. Her crew were rescued.
Brenda	United Kingdom	The brigantine ran aground off Lighthouse Point, Prince Edward Island, Canada. She was on a voyage from Summerside, Prince Edward Island to Plymouth, Devon. She was refloated.
Britannia	United Kingdom	The schooner was driven ashore at Laugharne, Glamorgan. Her crew were rescued.
Jarvis Lord	United States	The steamship struck an object in Lake Erie and was beached on Turtle Island. She was on a voyage from Toledo, Ohio to Buffalo, New York. She was refloated on 25 November and towed to Amherstburg, Ontario, Canada by the steamship Garland (Flag unknown).
Nautilus	Germany	The barque was driven against the quayside and damaged at Havre de Grâce, Seine-Inférieure, France.
Peppina Luiga	Austria-Hungary	The brig was wrecked near "Rogosniza". Her cre were rescued. She was on a voyage from Fiume to Cette, Hérault, France.
St. Joseph	France	The ship was driven ashoreat Salthouse, Norfolk, United Kingdom. She subsequently became a wreck.
Vestnik	Imperial Russian Navy	The gunboat broke from her moorings and was damaged at Havre de Grâce.
Vigilant	United Kingdom	The fishing trawler was run down and sunk off "Barley" by the steamship City of Dublin with the loss of two of her crew.
Unnamed	Flag unknown	The schooner capsized off Ingoldmells, Lincolnshire, United Kingdom. She was subsequently driven through Skegness Pier and came ashore 2 nautical miles (3.7 km) south of Skegness, Lincolnshire.
Two unnamed vessels	Flags unknown	The barques broke from their moorings and were damaged at Havre de Grâce.

== 20 November ==
List of shipwrecks: 20 November 1880
Ship	State	Description
Albert Celine	France	The ketch was driven ashore at Lydden Spout, Kent, United Kingdom. She was on a voyage from Dunkirk, Nord to Middlesbrough, Yorkshire, United Kingdom.
Alf	Norway	The barque, inward from Baltimore, Maryland, ran aground on the Kish Bank, in the Irish Sea. She was refloated by the tugs Flying Dutchman and Toiler (both United Kingdom) and towed in to Dublin, leaking.
Albicore	United Kingdom	The steamship ran aground at the mouth of the River Carron. She was refloated.
Andalusia	United Kingdom	The steamship ran aground at the mouth of the River Carron. She was on a voyage from Grangemouth, Stirlingshire to Middlesbrough. She was refloated on 29 November and resumed her voyage.
Carron	United Kingdom	The steamship ran aground at the mouth of the River Carron. She was on a voyage from Grangemouth to London. She was refloated.
Cornucopia	United Kingdom	The ship was driven ashore and wrecked at Santoña, Spain. She was on a voyage from Bilbao, Spain to Newport, Monmouthshire.
Frederic	Sweden	The barque ran aground on the Goodwin Sands, Kent. Her crew were rescued by the Ramsgate Lifeboat. She was on a voyage from Kalix to Bordeaux, Gironde, France.
Germania	Germany	The schooner was driven ashore at Margate, Kent. She was on a voyage from Hamburg to the Rio Grande. She was refloated and assisted in to Margate in a leaky condition by HMRC Adder ( Board of Customs).
Glencoe	United Kingdom	The steamship ran aground at the mouth of the River Carron. She was on a voyage from Grangemouth to Middlesbrough. She was refloated on 29 November and resumed her voyage.
Hampshire	United Kingdom	The steamship ran aground in the Red Sea. She was on a voyage from Sunderland, County Durham to Bombay, India. She was refloated and put in to Port Said, Egypt, where she arrived on 24 November.
Juan	United Kingdom	The ship was damaged by fire at Alexandria, Egypt.
Sleipner	Denmark	The barque was driven ashore and wrecked at Thisted with the loss of all hands. She was on a voyage from Hartlepool, County Durham and/or Grimsby, Lincolnshire, United Kingdom to Copenhagen.
Venskabet	Norway	The barque ran aground at Gibraltar. She was on a voyage from the Canada to Gibraltar.

== 21 November ==
List of shipwrecks: 21 November 1880
Ship	State	Description
Alice	United Kingdom	The steamship collided with the steamship Batavia in the River Mersey and was severely damaged. She was on a voyage from Liverpool, Lancashire to Pernambuco, Brazil. She put back to Liverpool.
Crusader	United Kingdom	The tug was driven ashore and wrecked at Whitburn, County Durham. Her eight crew were rescued the next day by the Whitburn Lifeboat. Crusader was refloated on 29 November with assistance from the tugs Ariel and Hetton (both United Kingdom) and was towed in to the River Wear.
Hugh Sleigh	United Kingdom	The steamship sank at Ytterøya, Norway. Her twenty crew were rescued. She was later refloated and taken in to Trondheim.
Marie	Germany	The galiot was driven ashore and wrecked on Heligoland. She was on a voyage from Vardø, Norway to Hamburg.
Ottawa	United Kingdom	The steamship was wrecked at Cape à la Roche, Quebec, Canada. All on board survived. She was on the return leg of her maiden voyage, from Montreal, Quebec to Liverpool, Lancashire. She was later refloated and towed in to Murray Bay, Quebec.
Retriever	United Kingdom	The brig was wrecked at New Harbour, Maine, United States. She was on a voyage from Madeira to Charlottetown, Prince Edward Island, Canada.

== 22 November ==
List of shipwrecks: 22 November 1880
Ship	State	Description
Adolph	Germany	The schooner was driven ashore and wrecked near Bolderāja, Russia. Her crew were rescued.
Alpha	United Kingdom	The smack was wrecked on the Ridge Sand, in the North Sea off the coast of Essex. Her crew were rescued. She was on a voyage from Greenhithe, Kent to Wivenhoe, Essex.
Aptery	United Kingdom	The smack collided with the steamship Palma (United Kingdom) in the North Sea and was severely damaged. Aptery was towed in to Great Yarmouth, Norfolk by the tug Meteor (United Kingdom).
Bob and Harry	United Kingdom	The steam wherry collided with the steamship Earl Percy (United Kingdom) and sank in the River Tyne.
Bristolian	United Kingdom	The steamship was driven ashore on Anticosti Island, Nova Scotia, Canada with the loss of four of her thirteen crew. She was on a voyage from Quebec City, Canada to Port Glasgow, Renfrewshire. She subsequently became a wreck.
Bulla	(United Kingdom of Great Britain and Ireland) Jersey	The schooner was driven ashore in Wexford Lough. Her crew were rescued by rocket apparatus. Bulla was on a voyage from Ship Harbour, Newfoundland Colony to Queenstown, County Cork. She was refloated on 14 December.
Catharina	Netherlands	The schooner was driven ashore and wrecked on Ameland, Friesland. Her crew were rescued. She was on a voyage from Riga, Russia to Delfzijl, Groningen.
Dunnottar Castle	United Kingdom	The ship caught fire and was scuttled in the Hooghly River at Chittagong, India. She was later refloated.
Han Yang, and Kungho	Hong Kong; China	The steamships collided at Hong Kong. Both vessels sank.
Jane	Canada	The barque was beached at Redcar, Yorkshire, United Kingdom. She was on a voyage from King's Lynn, Norfolk to Middlesbrough, Yorkshire. She broke in two later that day. All eighteen people on board were rescued by the Redcar Lifeboat Emma ( Royal National Lifeboat Institution).
Kranewitz	Germany	The barque was driven ashore and wrecked near Bolderāja.
Neutral	United Kingdom	The ship ran aground at Helsingør, Denmark.
Nile	United Kingdom	The ship capsized in the Atlantic Ocean with some loss of life. Survivors were rescued by the steamship Amsterdam (Netherlands). Nile was on a voyage from Quebec City, Canada to Cardiff, Glamorgan.
Oscar	United Kingdom	The ship collided with a steamship in the English Channel 8 nautical miles (15 km) west south west of The Lizard, Cornwall and was severely damaged. She was on a voyage from Málaga, Spain to Dunkirk, Nord, France. She put in to Falmouth, Cornwall the next day.
Plutus	Netherlands	The brig was driven ashore and wrecked near Bolderāja.
Susan	United Kingdom	The wherry was driven ashore near Troon, Ayrshire.

== 23 November ==
List of shipwrecks: 23 November 1880
Ship	State	Description
Bridgewater	United States	The ship was driven from her moorings and ran aground at Quebec City, Canada. She was refloated with assistance.
Crystal Spring	United Kingdom	The vessel struck a submerged object and sank in the Bristol Channel off Burnham-on-Sea, Somerset. Both crew survived. She was refloated and beached in a severely damaged condition.
Fiado	United Kingdom	The steamship ran aground in the Dardanelles at "Nagara". She was on a voyage from Taganrog, Russia to Malta. She was refloated the next day and resumed her voyage.
Goa	United Kingdom	The steamship ran aground in the River Ouse. She was on a voyage from Savannah, Georgia, United States to Goole, Yorkshire. She was refloated and completed her voyage.
Jane	Canada	The barque ran aground in the River Tees. She was on a voyage from King's Lynn, Norfolk, United Kingdom to the River Tees.
Julie	United Kingdom	The ship was sunk by ice in the Baltic Sea.
Macedonia	United Kingdom	The ship capsized with the loss of nine of her crew.
Prins Gustav	Norway	The schooner was severely damaged by ice in the Baltic Sea. She was on a voyage from Helsinki, Grand Duchy of Finland to Louvain, Flemish Brabrant, Belgium. She put in to Copenhagen, Denmark for repairs.
Reata	United Kingdom	The brigantine was abandoned in the Atlantic Ocean (48°40′N 22°05′W). Her crew were rescued by the brig Beagle (United Kingdom). Reata was on a voyage from Charlottetown, Prince Edward Island, Canada to Liverpool, Lancashire.
Roelfina	Germany	The ship sank in the Weser. Her crew were rescued.
Tartar	United Kingdom	The brig was driven ashore and wrecked at Flamborough Head, Yorkshire. Her eight crew were rescued by the Flamborough Lifeboat. She was refloated on 30 November and taken in to Bridlington.
Texel	Netherlands	The schooner was abandoned off Heligoland. Her crew were rescued. She was on a voyage form Riga, Russia to Delfzijl, Groningen.
Unnamed	Flag unknown	The brig ran aground on the Nore. She was refloated.
Three unnamed vessels	(Ottoman Empire) Egypt	The lighters sank at Alexandria.

== 24 November ==
List of shipwrecks: 24 November 1880
Ship	State	Description
Charlotte	Germany	The ship was driven ashore and wrecked on Heligoland. Her crew were rescued.
Hispatia, or Hispalis	Spain	The steamship ran aground at Bilbao. She was a total loss.
Immanuel	Germany	The ship was driven ashore and wrecked on Heligoland. Her crew were rescued. She was on a voyage from the Eider to the Elbe.
Jeune Albert	France	The lighter sank in the Gironde at Pauillac, Gironde.
John A. Harvie	Canada	The barque was driven ashore at Tacumshane, County Wexford, United Kingdom. All nineteen people on board were rescued by the Carnsore lifeboat Iris ( Royal National Lifeboat Institution).
Lord Byron	United Kingdom	The steamship ran aground at Maassluis, South Holland, Netherlands. She was on a voyage from Maryport, Cumberland to Rotterdam, South Holland. She was refloated.
Madeline	United Kingdom	The steamship ran ashore and was wrecked between Boulby and Staithes, Yorkshire. Her crew were rescued by the Staithes Lifeboat. Madeleine was on a voyage from Danzig, Germany to Grimsby, Lincolnshire. She was refloated on 29 November and towed in to Hartlepool, County Durham by four tugs.
Marie	United Kingdom	The steamship ran aground between Landskrona and Malmö, Sweden. She was on a voyage from London to Stettin, Germany. She was refloated and taken in to Copenhagen, Denmark.
Mavis	United Kingdom	The steamship struck the Cherdonnière Rock off the mouth of the Gironde and sank with the loss of two of her crew. Survivors were rescued by Galtean (France). Mavis was on a voyage from Hamburg, Germany to Bordeaux, Gironde, France.
Mendora	United Kingdom	The ship was abandoned in the Atlantic Ocean 100 nautical miles (190 km) off Cape Clear Island, County Cork. Twelve of her eighteen crew were rescued by the barque Matheron (United Kingdom). The rest were rescued by the steamship Scotland (United Kingdom). Mendora was on a voyage from Quebec City, Canada to the Clyde.
Mogul	United Kingdom	The barque was abandoned in the Atlantic Ocean. Her crew were rescued by the steamship Sardinian (United Kingdom). Mogul was on a voyage from Quebec City to Newcastle upon Tyne, Northumberland.
Nairs	United Kingdom	The steamship struck the Chardounière Rocks, off the Île d'Oléron, Charente-Inférieure, France and foundered with the loss of two of her crew. Survivors were rescued by Galtean (Flag unknown).
New York	United Kingdom	The Thames barge was run into by the steamship Progress (United Kingdom) at Woolwich, Kent and was beached.
Oncle Joseph, and Ortigia	France; Italy	The steamship Oncle Joseph collided with the steamship Ortigia and sank off La Spezia with the loss of 239 of the 297 people on board. Oncle Joseph was on a voyage from Marseille, Bouches-du-Rhône to La Spezia. Ortigia was on a voyage from Genoa to La Spezia. Severely damaged, she put in to Livorno.
Simcoe	United Kingdom	The steamship foundered in Lake Huron with the loss of twelve of her seventeen crew.
Trafik	Norway	The barque foundered in the Atlantic Ocean. Her crew were rescued by the barque Mary A. Chapman ( Canada). Trafik was on a voyage from Philadelphia, Pennsylvania to Arendal.
Unnamed	Norway	The barque ran aground on the Swallow Bank, off Littlestone-on-Sea, Kent.

== 25 November ==
List of shipwrecks: 25 November 1880
Ship	State	Description
Annie Louise	United States	The ship was driven ashore. She was on a voyage from Charleston, South Carolina to Stralsund, Germany. She was refloated and taken in to Helsingør, Denmark.
Arion	Norway	The schooner was driven ashore at Rasvåg. She was on a voyage from Wick, Caithness, United Kingdom to Risør. She was refloated on 16 December and taken in to Risør.
Atlas	Germany	The barque was driven ashore at Atherfield, Isle of Wight, United Kingdom and broke her back. Her crew were rescued by rocket apparatus. She was on a voyage from New York, United States to Papenburg.
Barnesmore	United Kingdom	The steamship ran aground in the Danube. She was refloated.
Caledonian	United Kingdom	The crewless schooner foundered off Red Bay, County Antrim.
Eclipse	United Kingdom	The brigantine was driven ashore at "Knockrome", in the Small Isles, Argyllshire.
Elena Cordona	Italy	The barque was driven ashore and wrecked on Coll, Inner Hebrides, United Kingdom. She was on a voyage from Troon, Ayrshire, United Kingdom to Demerara, British Guiana.
Florida	(United Kingdom of Great Britain and Ireland) Jersey	The schooner was run down and sunk off Saint-Nazaire, Ille-et-Vilaine, France by Charles Goddard (United Kingdom) with the loss of two of her crew. Florida was on a voyage from "Moricq" to Swansea, Glamorgan.
G. F. Haendal	Germany	The ship arrived at Stanley, Falkland Islands on fire. She burnt down to the waterline. She was on a voyage from Bremen to Honolulu, Kingdom of Hawaii.
Haab	Netherlands	The barque was driven ashore at Littlestone-on-Sea, Kent, United Kingdom. She was on a voyage from New York to Rotterdam, South Holland. She was refloated and assisted in to Dover, Kent.
Isabella	United Kingdom	The ketch was driven ashore and wrecked at Redcar, Yorkshire.
Lindesnaes	Russia	The ship was driven ashore at Goeree, Zeeland, Netherlands. She was on a voyage from Kronstadt to Rotterdam, South Holland, Netherlands.
Mabel	United Kingdom	The steamship ran aground in the Danube.
Malleable	United Kingdom	The steamship struck rocks off Grangemouth, Stirlingshire, damaging her propeller. She was on a voyage from Grangemouth to Middlesbrough, Yorkshire. She was towed in to Leith, Lothian for repairs.
Rosamond	United Kingdom	The steamship struck the Cabezos Tarifa and foundered. Her crew were rescued. She was on a voyage from Cartagena, Spain to an English port.
Sultan	United Kingdom	The brig was driven ashore and wrecked at Brouwershaven, Zeeland, Netherlands. Her crew were rescued. She was on a voyage from Lisbon, Portugal to Vlaardingen, South Holland, Netherlands.

== 26 November ==
List of shipwrecks: 26 November 1880
Ship	State	Description
Alexander	United Kingdom	The ship ran aground on the Hullstairs Skares, off the coast of Moray. She was on a voyage from Rochester, Kent to Lybster, Caithness. She was refloated but was later abandoned by her crew, who were rescued by a fishing boat. Alexander was subsequently taken in to Lossiemouth, Moray.
Braes o'Moray	United Kingdom	The schooner ran aground on the Outcars, off the coast of Northumberland. Her five crew were rescued by the Newbiggin Lifeboat. She was on a voyage from London to Peterhead, Aberdeenshire.
Carrick Castle	United Kingdom	The ship ran aground on the Maplin Sand, in the North Sea off the coast of Essex. She was on a voyage from New York, United States to London. She was refloated on 29 November and taken in to Gravesend, Kent.
Catherine Morgan	United Kingdom	The schooner was driven ashore at "Isle Varoo", County Clare. She was on a voyage from Connah's Quay, Flintshire to Galway. She was later refloated with assistance.
Clio, and Florence Nightingale	Norway; United Kingdom	The schooner Florence Nightingale was driven into the barque Clio and sank in the Firth of Clyde. Her crew were rescued. Clio was towed in to Greenock, Renfrewshire in a severely damaged condition.
Dania	Sweden	The schooner was driven ashore 40 nautical miles (74 km) north of Polangen, Russia.
Doctor	United Kingdom	The lighter capsized and sank in the Clyde with the loss of her captain.
Elvina	France	The ship foundered off Les Casquets, Channel Islands. Her crew were rescued. She was on a voyage from Boulogne, Pas-de-Calais to Livorno, Italy.
Forganhall, and Labrador	United Kingdom	The full-rigged ship Labrador was driven into the full-rigged ship Forganhall off Greenock. Both vessels were severely damaged.
Gravelinois	France	The barque was driven ashore at Kirkcaldy, Fife, United Kingdom. She was on a voyage from Calais to Charlestown, Fife. She was refloated the next day.
Isabella	United Kingdom	The fishing trawler capsized and sank in the Firth of Clyde off Garvel Point, Renfrewshire with the loss of all four crew.
Janet	United Kingdom	The ship was driven ashore at "Port Dristaig".
Johanna and Emma	Flag unknown	The ship was abandoned in the Baltic Sea. Her crew were rescued by Wave (United Kingdom). Johanna and Emma was taken in to Ventava, Courland Governorate.
Joseph Howe	United Kingdom	The ship ran aground at Carrickfergus, County Antrim and sprang a leak. She was on a voyage from Dublin to Maryport, Cumberland.
Linda	United Kingdom	The schooner capsized off Queenstown, County Cork. She was towed in to Queenstown in a capsized condition. She was on a voyage from Wolgast, Germany to Liverpool, Lancashire.
Margaret	United Kingdom	The ship was driven ashore at "Port Dristaig".
North Star	United Kingdom	The schooner ran aground on the Barahouri Bank, in the Irish Sea. Her crew were rescued. She was on a voyage from Ramsey, Isle of Man to Whitehaven, Cumberland.
Palermo	United Kingdom	The steamship was driven ashore 7 nautical miles (13 km) west of Ventava.
Panmure	United Kingdom	The ship was driven ashore north of South Queensferry, Lothian. She was refloated the next day and towed in to Port Edgar, Lothian.
Peel	United Kingdom	The fishing smack foundered in the Holy Loch with the loss of all four crew.
Sarah	United Kingdom	The schooner was driven ashore and wrecked at Moville, County Donegal. She was on a voyage from Londonderry to Burtonport, County Donegal.
Siddarthur	United Kingdom	The barque ran aground in Tralee Bay. She was refloated.
Sophia Margaret	United Kingdom	The schooner was driven ashore and wrecked in Ballydonegan Bay. Her crew survived.
Theodor	Russia	The barque was driven ashore in Køge Bay.
Vandyck	Canada	The barque was driven ashore at Roseneath Point, Argyllshire. She was refloated the next day and towed in to Greenock.

== 27 November ==
List of shipwrecks: 27 November 1880
Ship	State	Description
Alexander	United Kingdom	The schooner struck Halliman's Skares, off Lossiemouth, Moray and was abandoned. Her crew were rescued by a fishing boat. She was taken in to Lossiemouth the next day.
Ekenas	United Kingdom	The ship was driven ashore at Cockle Point, County Galway. She was refloated with the assistance of a tug on 3 December and beached at Galway in a severely damaged condition.
Emilie	United Kingdom	The ship ran aground in the Drogden. She was on a voyage from Riga, Russia to Leith, Lothian. She was refloated and taken in to Copenhagen, Denmark.
Joseph Clark	Netherlands	The barque was abandoned in the Atlantic Ocean. Her crew were rescued. She was on a voyage from Baltimore, Maryland, United States to Antwerp, Belgium.
Helene	Germany	The schooner foundered in the North Sea (56°25′N 3°00′E). Her crew were rescued by the fishing smack Exhort (United Kingdom). Helene was on a voyage from Geestemünde to East Wemyss, Fife, United Kingdom.
Howard	United Kingdom	The barque ran aground at Passage East, County Waterford. She was on a voyage from Philadelphia, Pennsylvania, United States to Waterford. She was refloated.
Louisiana	Italy	The barque was severely damaged by fire at New Orleans, Louisiana, United States.
Scud	(United Kingdom of Great Britain and Ireland) Guernsey	The ship was driven ashore at "Rauso". She was on a voyage from Odesa, Russia to Wisbech, Cambridgeshire. She was refloated and taken in to Fredrikshavn, Denmark.

== 28 November ==
List of shipwrecks: 28 November 1880
Ship	State	Description
Admiral Peter Tordenskjold	Norway	The barque was abandoned 20 nautical miles (37 km) south south west of the Chicken Rock Lighthouse, Isle of Man. Her crew were rescued by the steamship Galatea (United Kingdom). Admiral Peter Tordenskjold was on a voyage from Norway to Musquash, New Brunswick, Canada. She was towed in to Limerick in a derelict condition on 6 December.
Balla	United Kingdom	The schooner was driven ashore at "Lough", County Wexford.
Challenge	United Kingdom	The barque was driven ashore and wrecked on the south point of Gigha with the loss of seven of her 24 crew. She was on a voyage from Quebec City, Canada to Greenock, Renfrewshire.
Jonstrop	Sweden	The barque was driven ashore on Öland. She was on a voyage from Hudiksvall to Hartlepool, County Durham, United Kingdom.
Olaf Kyrre	Norway	The brig was driven ashore in Dundrum Bay between Dundrum and Newcastle, County Down, United Kingdom with the loss of a crew member. She was on a voyage from Pictou, Nova Scotia, Canada to Newry, County Antrim, United Kingdom. Olaf Kyrre was refloated on 1 December.
Racer	United Kingdom	The schooner sprang a leak and was abandoned in the Atlantic Ocean (46°36′N 2°48′W). Her crew were rescued by Johann (Flag unknown). Racer was on a voyage from New York, United States to Falmouth, Cornwall.
Tryst	United Kingdom	The schooner was driven ashore at Littleferry, Sutherland. She was on a voyage from Sunderland, County Durham to Helmsdale, Sutherland.

== 29 November ==
List of shipwrecks: 29 November 1880
Ship	State	Description
Benan	United Kingdom	The ship ran aground in the Scheldt. She was on a voyage from Akyab, Burma to Antwerp, Belgium. She was refloated with the assistance of tugs.
Cynosure	United Kingdom	The full-rigged ship was abandoned in the Atlantic Ocean. Her 24 crew were rescued by the steamship Australia (United Kingdom). Cynosure was on a voyage from Quebec City to Bristol, Gloucestershire.
Elizabeth Stephens	United Kingdom	The ship collided with the steamship Valdes (United Kingdom) and sank in the River Thames. Her crew were rescued. Elizabeth Stephens was on a voyage from London to the Natal Colony.
Fanny	United Kingdom	The brig was abandoned in the Atlantic Ocean. Her crew were rescued by the steamship Imbros (United Kingdom). Fanny was on a voyage from Quebec City, Canada to Bristol.
Laurel	United Kingdom	The barque was driven ashore and wrecked at Cantick Head, Orkney Islands. Her crew were rescued by rocket apparatus. She was on a voyage from Quebec City to Aberdeen. She was refloated on 29 November with assistance from the tug Cruizer (United Kingdom) and was beached at Longhope. Laurel was consequently declared a total loss.
Pride of Anglesey	United Kingdom	The schooner was driven ashore south of the Point of Ayre, Isle of Man.
Sarah Dickson	United Kingdom	The ship was driven ashore near Portland, Dorset. She was on a voyage from Caen, Calvados, France to Campbeltown, Argyllshire.
Templar	United Kingdom	The yacht was driven into by the smack Providence (United Kingdom) and sank at Donegal.

== 30 November ==
List of shipwrecks: 30 November 1880
Ship	State	Description
Allerwash	United Kingdom	The steamship was driven ashore between Katwijk and Scheveningen, South Holland, Netherlands. She was on a voyage from Sunderland, County Durham to Rotterdam, South Holland. She was refloated with assistance.
Ashler	United Kingdom	The ship ran aground on Philip's Reef, in the Turks Islands. She was on a voyage from the Turks Islands to Saint John's, Newfoundland Colony. She was consequently condemned.
Aspirant	United Kingdom	The schooner ran aground on the Dragør Sands, in the Baltic Sea. She was on a voyage from Riga, Russia to Havre de Grâce, Seine-Inférieure, France. She was refloated with assistance from a steamship and taken in to Copenhagen, Denmark.
Craig Alvah	United Kingdom	The ship collided with the barque Lief (Norway) and was abandoned. Two of her eleven crew got aboard Lief. Craig Alvah was subsequently taken in to Lysekil, Norway in a derelict condition.
Daniel	United Kingdom	The brigantine ran aground and was wrecked at Port Talbot, Glamorgan. She was on a voyage from Bilbao, Spain to Port Talbot.
Despina	Flag unknown	The brig was wrecked off "Lauritum", Greece with the loss of all but two of her crew.
Marion	(United Kingdom of Great Britain and Ireland) Isle of Man	The ship was wrecked on the Burbo Bank, in Liverpool Bay.
Mavis	United Kingdom	The barque was driven ashore at Katwijk. She was on a voyage from New York, United States to Amsterdam, North Holland, Netherlands.
Pet	United Kingdom	The schooner ran aground and sank at Port Talbot. Her crew, five or fifteen people, were rescued by the Mumbles Lifeboat.
Rossend Castle	United Kingdom	The steamship ran aground on the Cross Sand, in the North Sea off the coast of Norfolk. She was refloated with assistance from the fishing smack Fearless (United Kingdom) and resumed her voyage.

== Unknown date ==
List of shipwrecks: Unknown date in November 1880
Ship	State	Description
Active	Ceylon	The Ceylon government tug struck rocks when seeking shelter at Pantelleria, Italy, on her delivery voyage from London to Colombo, Ceylon. She put in to Malta on 19 November in a leaky condition, for repairs.
Agil	Norway	The brig sprang a leak and foundered in the North Sea on or before 5 November. Her crew were rescued by the schooner Emmanuel (Denmark). Agil was on a voyage from Leith, Lothian, United Kingdom to Christiania.
Albatross	Norway	The barque was driven ashore on Læsø, Denmark. She was later refloated with the assistance of a steamship and taken in to Gothenburg, Sweden.
Alida Sarah	Netherlands	The ship foundered at sea en route to Fredrikstad, Norway in ballast. Her crew were rescued and were landed at Gothenburg on 11 November.
Anna	Germany	The galiot sprang a leak and foundered in the North Sea. Her crew were rescued by the schooner Tre Venner (Denmark) and landed at Great Yarmouth on 1 November. Anna was on a voyage from Amsterdam, North Holland, Netherlands to Arendal, Norway.
Anna	Norway	The brig foundered in the North Sea. Her crew were rescued. She was on a voyage from Burntisland, Fife, United Kingdom to Christiania.
Anna	Norway	The brig was discovered abandoned in the Dogger Bank. She was towed in to Grimsby, Lincolnshire, United Kingdom by the smacks Baxter and Rosetta (both United Kingdom).
Anne	United Kingdom	The brig foundered with the loss of all eight crew. She was on a voyage from Rouen, Seine-Inférieure, France to the River Tyne.
Antipodes	United Kingdom	The ship was abandoned in the North Sea. She was on a voyage from Vyborg, Grand Duchy of Finland to Harwich, Essex. She was towed in to IJmuiden, North Holland, Netherlands in a derelict and waterlogged condition. She was consequently condemned.
Aravana	Norway	The schooner was wrecked on Læsø, Denmark. She was on a voyage from Grenaa, Denmark to Christiania.
Argentina	Germany	The steamship caught fire in the Atlantic Ocean and was abandoned before 27 November. She was on a voyage from Hamburg to the River Plate.
Atlantic	United Kingdom	The steamship ran aground near Gallipoli, Ottoman Empire. She was on a voyage from Constantinople, Ottoman Empire to Liverpool. She was refloated and resumed her voyage, but put in to Malta in a leaky condition on 4 November.
Auburn	Netherlands	The barque was abandoned in the North Sea off the Lemon and Owers Sandbank. Her nine crew were rescued by a fishing boat. She was on a voyage from South Shields, County Durham, United Kingdom to Trieste.
Balance	Germany	The brig was driven ashore and wrecked on Sylt. Her crew were rescued. She was on a voyage from Gävle, Sweden to Grimsby, Lincolnshire, United Kingdom.
Beatrice	United Kingdom	The ship ran aground in St. George's Bay. She was on a voyage from Gaspé, Quebec to a Brazilian port.
Blue Bell	United Kingdom	The ship was burnt at sea. Her crew were rescued by a smack.
Boyne	United Kingdom	The ship struck a sunken rock and sprang a severe leak. She was beached at Cape St. Charles, Newfoundland Colony in a severely damaged condition and was abandoned by her crew. She was on a voyage from Montreal, Quebec, Canada to London.
Brise Lames	France	The barque was driven ashore in Antongil Bay.
Brothers	United Kingdom	The ship was driven ashore at Lowestoft, Suffolk. Her crew were rescued.
Busy Bee	United Kingdom	The fishing dandy struck a sunken wreck and foundered in the North Sea. Her crew were rescued by the fishing dandy Snowdrop (United Kingdom).
Bygdin	Norway	The barque was driven ashore and wrecked at the Pointe de la Coubre, Gironde, France. Her crew were rescued. She was declared a total loss.
Canada	United Kingdom	The ship was abandoned at sea. She was on a voyage from Quebec City, Canada to London. She was subsequently discovered by Dronningen (Norway), which towed her in to Cherbourg, Manche, France on 15 November.
Caroline	United Kingdom	The schooner was wrecked. Her crew were rescued by the Thurso Lifeboat.
Carthaginian	United Kingdom	The ship ran aground on the Haisborough Sands, in the North Sea off the coast of Norfolk. She was on a voyage from Dieppe, Seine-Inférieure to South Shields. She was refloated and completed her voyage in a leaky condition.
Catherine and Elle	United Kingdom	The schooner was wrecked. Her crew were rescued by the Thurso Lifeboat.
Cesar Goddefroy	Germany	The barque ran aground on the Juister Riff, in the North Sea off the coast of Germany and was wrecked. Her crew were rescued. She was on a voyage from Liverpool to Hamburg.
Champion	United Kingdom	The barque was abandoned in the Atlantic Ocean (45°43′N 31°15′W). Her crew were rescued by the barque Eliza (Spain). Champion was on a voyage from Miramichi, New Brunswick, Canada to a British port.
Christiene	Flag unknown	The ship was driven ashore on Texel, North Holland, Netherlands.
Craigownie	United Kingdom	The steamship ran aground at Bilbao, Spain. She was refloated on 27 November.
Delambre	United Kingdom	The steamship ran aground at New Orleans. She was on a voyage from Rio de Janeiro, Brazil to New Orleans. She was refloated and taken in to New Orleans.
Diligent	United Kingdom	The brig was driven ashore and wrecked on Jussarö, Grand Duchy of Finland. She was on a voyage from Vyborg to Wisbech, Cambridgeshire. She was refloated in late December and taken in to Helsinki, Grand Duchy of Finland.
Dinorwic	United Kingdom	The ship was driven ashore at Westerplatte, Germany. She was on a voyage from Tornio, Grand Duchy of Finland to Aberdovey, Merionethshire.
Doemring	Norway	The barque was wrecked on the Mexican coast before 9 November. Her crew were rescued.
Douglas	United Kingdom	The steamship was wrecked in the Altan Straits. All on board were rescued. She was on a voyage from Amoy to Fuzhou (Foochow), China.
Dunstanborough	United Kingdom	The steamship collided with the steamship Le Creusot (France) and was severely damaged. Dunstanborough was on a voyage from Rotterdam, South Holland, Netherlands to the River Tyne. She completed her voyage.
Edsa Ann Fanny	Flag unknown	The ship was wrecked on the Swedish coast before 13 November.
Edward Cardwell	United Kingdom	The ship was lost in the Gulf of Saint Lawrence. Her crew were rescued. She was on a voyage from Quebec City to Greenock, Renfrewshire.
Eleanor	United Kingdom	The ship was abandoned in the Atlantic Ocean.
Ella	Denmark	The schooner was driven ashore. She was on a voyage from Sundsvall, Sweden to London. She was refloated and taken in to Rønne in a leaky condition.
Emerald Isle	United Kingdom	The schooner sank off Penmon, Anglesey.
Emulation	United Kingdom	The ship was abandoned in the Atlantic Ocean before 11 November.
Familien	Sweden	The ship was driven ashore east of Trelleborg. She was on a voyage from Vyborg, Grand Duchy of Finland to Ghent, East Flanders, Belgium.
Fanny Lewis	United Kingdom	The barque was driven ashore at Vineyard Haven, Massachusetts, United States.
Felix Brandt	Denmark	The barque was driven ashore on Skagen. She was on a voyage from Hull, Yorkshire, United Kingdom to Copenhagen.
Feodore	United Kingdom	The brigantine was driven ashore at Savage Harbour, Prince Edward Island, Canada. She was on a voyage from Madeira to Malpeque, Prince Edward Island. She was declared a total loss.
Flechero	United Kingdom	The ship was driven ashore on Pratas Island, in the Formosa Channel before 9 November. At least some of her crew were rescued. She was on a voyage from Hong Kong to San Francisco, California, United States.
Foam	United Kingdom	The derelict smack was towed in to Great Yarmouth, Norfolk.
Francisco Picasso	Italy	The barque was driven ashore and wrecked near Batoum, Russia. Her crew were rescued. She was on a voyage from Poti, Russia to Liverpool.
Franco	Flag unknown	The steamship ran aground in Langangsfjord. She was on a voyage from Christiania, Norway to Newcastle upon Tyne, Northumberland, United Kingdom. She was refloated and taken in to Tønsberg, Norway.
Francois	Netherlands	The schooner was abandoned in the North Sea. She was on a voyage from Riga, Russia to Middlesbrough, Yorkshire. She was towed in to the Nieuwe Diep in a derelict condition.
Freden	Norway	The barque was wrecked on the Goodwin Sands, Kent, United Kingdom. Her eleven crew were rescued by the Ramsgate Lifeboat Bradford ( Royal National Lifeboat Institution).
Friedrich Strange	Flag unknown	The ship was driven ashore at the Hekkingen Lighthouse, Norway in a derelict condition.
Geraldine	United Kingdom	The brig ran aground on the Sand Head, off Ryde, Isle of Wight.
Gerhard	Flag unknown	The ship foundered. She was on a voyage from Saint Petersburg, Russia to a Scottish port.
Gesine Bernardhine	Germany	The galiot was discovered abandoned at sea. She was towed in to Mandal, Norway in a waterlogged condition.
Glenavon	United Kingdom	The steamship was driven ashore at Falsterbo, Sweden. She was on a voyage from Stettin to Hull. She was refloated with assistance and taken in to Copenhagen for repairs.
Gold Hunter	United States	The ship was wrecked on Balabac Island, Malaya. Her crew were rescued. She was on a voyage from Cardiff, Glamorgan, United Kingdom to Hong Kong.
Goudvisch	Netherlands	The schooner was driven ashore on Læsø, Denmark and sank. She was on a voyage from Memel, Germany to Leith.
Haabet	Norway	The schooner was towed in to Great Yarmouth in a derelict condition by the ketch Echo (United Kingdom).
Hampshire	United Kingdom	The steamship was driven ashore in the Red Sea. She was on a voyage from Sunderland, County Durham to Bombay, India. She was refloated and taken in to Suez, Egypt, where she arrived on 26 November.
Hannah G.	United Kingdom	The ship was abandoned at sea before 13 November. Her crew were rescued. She was on a voyage from Miramichi to Glasgow, Renfrewshire.
Helene	Flag unknown	The ship was driven ashore and wrecked at Fredrikshavn, Denmark.
Helene	United Kingdom	The schooner was driven ashore and sank at Rye, Sussex. Her crew were rescued.
Hetty Ellen	United Kingdom	The ship was driven ashore at "Summerville", Prince Edward Island, Canada. She was on a voyage from Summerside, Prince Edward Island, Canada to Bristol, Gloucestershire.
Husaren	Flag unknown	The ship was driven ashore and wrecked on Læsø, Denmark.
Ida	Russia	The brig was driven ashore at "Hohn". She was on voyage from Grimsby to Copenhagen.
Impero	United Kingdom	The barque foundered in the Atlantic Ocean. Her crew were rescued by the barque Karnak (United Kingdom). Impero was on a voyage from Philadelphia, Pennsylvania, United States to Limerick.
Ironsides	United States	The barque became waterlogged in St. Georges Bay. She was on a voyage from Quebec City to Montevideo, Uruguay.
James Edwards	United Kingdom	The barque was abandoned in the Atlantic Ocean (50°31′N 20°58′W). Her 22 crew were rescued by the steamship Parthia (United Kingdom). James Edwards was on a voyage from Quebec City to Liverpool.
Johann Heinrich	Germany	The barque was abandoned in the Pacific Ocean 250 nautical miles (460 km) off San Francisco with some loss of life. She was on a voyage from Hamburg to San Francisco.
Julius	Flag unknown	The ship was driven ashore at Trekroner, Denmark.
Kati Maas	Norway	The ship ran aground in the River Tay. She was on a voyage from Tayport, Fife, United Kingdom to Christiania. She was refloated.
Klemento Florentines	Flag unknown	The ship was driven ashore at Helsinki, Grand Duchy of Finland.
Leading Star	United Kingdom	The brig was wrecked off Umzimkula, Africa with the loss of four of her nine crew. She was on a voyage from Christiana, Norway to the Colony of Natal.
Lemnos	United Kingdom	The steamship was driven ashore on the Russian coast. She had been refloated by 4 November and taken in to Reval.
Les Piot	Norway	The ship was abandoned in the Atlantic Ocean. Her crew were rescued by Union (Germany). Les Piot was on a voyage from Miramichi to Liverpool.
Lisvane	United Kingdom	The steamship foundered in the Bay of Biscay off Ouessant, Finistère, France with the loss of all fourteen crew. She was on a voyage from A Coruña, Spain to Newport, Monmouthshire.
Little Nell	United Kingdom	The schooner foundered off Barra Head, Outer Hebrides.
Little Saefa	Flag unknown	The ship was driven ashore at Grimskär.
Little Sarah	United Kingdom	The ship was driven ashore near Kalmar, Sweden.
Lizette	Germany	The schooner was driven ashore at Swinemünde. She was on a voyage from Reval, Russia to Hull.
Lombard	United Kingdom	The steamship ran aground in Lake St. Peter and was severely damaged. She was on a voyage from Montreal to London.
Maria D.	Flag unknown	The ship caught fire at Baltimore, Maryland, United States. She was on a voyage from Marseille, Bouches-du-Rhône, France to Baltimore. The fire was extinguished.
Marie Elisabeth	Russia	The schooner struck a sunken wreck off Lyserort, Courland Governorate and was damaged. She was on a voyage from Pärnu to Belfast, County Antrim, United Kingdom.
Martha	Germany	The schooner was driven ashore at Skarlof, Öland, Sweden. She was on a voyage from Swinemünde to Söderköping, Sweden.
Martha	United Kingdom	The brigantine was driven ashore at Nidingen, Sweden. She was on a voyage from Skutskär, Sweden to Aberdovey, Merionethshire.
Martino Maria	United Kingdom	The barque ran aground at Gibraltar. She was on a voyage from Tripoli, Ottoman Tripolitania to Newcastle upon Tyne. She was refloated and towed in to Gibraltar.
Maude	United Kingdom	The schooner was driven ashore on Lindisfarne, Northumberland. She was on a voyage from Bremen, Germany to Runcorn, Cheshire. She was refloated in January 1881, having been ashore for eight weeks.
Miramichi	United Kingdom	The ship was driven ashore at Machias, Maine, United States. She was on a voyage from Saint John, New Brunswick, Canada to London.
Moderatie	Netherlands	The schooner foundered in the Baltic Sea before 12 November. Her crew were rescued. She was on a voyage from Saint Petersburg to a Dutch port.
Monaltrie	South Australia	The ship ran aground near Port Augusta. She was refloated.
Napoleon	United Kingdom	The ship was driven ashore and damaged. She was on a voyage from Caernarfon to London. She was refloated and taken in to Holyhead, Anglesey.
Nathaniel Webster	United States	The fishing schooner was lost in the Grand Banks of Newfoundland with the loss of all fourteen crew.
Nesteon	Germany	The barque was abandoned in the Atlantic Ocean.
Neva	United Kingdom	The brigantine was beached on Arranmore, County Donegal. She had been refloated by 20 November.
Norden	United Kingdom	The ship ran aground at Gothenburg. She was on a voyage from Hudiksvall, Sweden to Shoreham-by-Sea, Sussex. She was refloated.
Norden	Norway	The ship was abandoned in the Atlantic Ocean and set afire. Her crew were rescued by City of London (United Kingdom). Norden was on a voyage from Quebec City to London.
Nordstjernen	Norway	The brig was towed in to the Nieuwe Diep in a derelict condition.
Norton	United Kingdom	The ship was towed in to Queenstown, County Cork in a waterlogged and derelict condition. She was on a voyage from Miramichi to Belfast.
Nueva Pastora	Spain	The schooner was abandoned in the Atlantic Ocean 20 nautical miles (37 km) north of Ouessant, Finistère, France with the loss of three of her ten crew. Survivors were rescued by the steamship Mardy (United Kingdom). Nueva Pastora was on a voyage from Viviero to Cardiff.
Oriana	United Kingdom	The ship was driven ashore at Sydney, Nova Scotia. She was on a voyage from Quebec City to the Clyde.
Orion	Norway	The brigantine was driven ashore at Rasvåg. She was on a voyage from Wick, Caithness to Risør.
Pallas	Norway	The ship was abandoned at sea on or before 1 November. She came ashore at Lemvig, Denmark on 5 November and was wrecked.
Pamlico	United Kingdom	The ship was driven ashore on Anticosti Island. She was on a voyage from Quebec City to Montevideo, Uruguay.
Panther	United Kingdom	The barquentine was abandoned at sea on or before 2 November. Her crew were rescued.
Phoenician	(United Kingdom of Great Britain and Ireland) Isle of Man	The schooner was wrecked. Her fourteen crew were rescued by the Thurso Lifeboat.
Prairie Gem	Sweden	The brig was driven ashore. She was refloated and taken in to Höganäs in a leaky condition.
Princess	United Kingdom	The ship was abandoned in the Atlantic Ocean. Her crew were rescued. She was on a voyage from Trinidad to Bremen.
Prioress	United Kingdom	The brig struck a sunken wreck 10 nautical miles (19 km) off Morte Point, Devon between 8 and 12 November and became leaky. She put back to Swansea, Glamorgan.
Punch	United Kingdom	The ship was driven ashore in Lofsha Bay. She was on a voyage from Shoreham-by-Sea to Gävle, Sweden.
Raro	Italy	The barque was driven ashore on Verde Island, near Savanilla, United States of Colombia. She was refloated and taken in to the Magdalen River.
Recovery	United Kingdom	The ship was driven ashore in Chaleur Bay before 13 November. She was refloated and found to be leaky.
Richard Cobden	United Kingdom	The ship was driven ashore on the Norwegian coast. She was refloated and taken in to Lillesand in a leaky condition.
Rival	Germany	The barque was driven ashore and wrecked in the Koster Islands, Sweden. Her crew were rescued. She was on a voyage from Riga to Terneuzen, Zeeland.
Shirley	United States	The steamship was severely damaged by fire at Baltimore, Maryland. She was declared a total loss.
Sigurd	Germany	The ship was driven ashore at Stubben, Denmark. She was on a voyage from Riga to Londonderry, United Kingdom. She was refloated and taken in to Copenhagen, Denmark.
Sjothorp	Sweden	The steamship ran aground. She was on a voyage from Stockholm to Gothenburg. She was refloated.
Sofala	Sweden	The barque was abandoned at sea. Her crew were rescued. She was on a voyage from Miramichi to an Irish port. Sofala was subsequently towed in to Harbour Buffet, Newfoundland Colony.
Sorata	United Kingdom	The steamship was driven ashore at "Cape Jarvis", South Australia before 3 November. She was refloated and towed in to Nepean Bay.
Sparkling Glance	United Kingdom	The schooner was driven ashore on the coast of Labrador, Newfoundland Colony. She was refloated.
Speculator	Canada	The schooner was driven ashore at Bluefields, Jamaica. She was refloated but was consequently condemned.
Teutonia	United Kingdom	The steamship caught fire at New Orleans, Louisiana.
Trafik	Norway	The barque was abandoned in the Atlantic Ocean. Her crew were rescued. She was on a voyage from Philadelphia to Arendal.
Tre Soskende	Sweden	The ship was driven ashore on Lidö. Her crew survived.
Trofast	Norway	The barque was abandoned in the Atlantic Ocean.
Tromoke	Netherlands	The koff sprang a leak and sank in the Baltic Sea off the south point of Öland. Her crew were rescued. She was on a voyage from Saint Petersburg, Russia to Helsingør, Denmark.
Uno	Norway	The barque was driven ashore and severely damaged at Audresselles, Pas-de-Calais, France. She was on a voyage from New York to Hamburg.
Winifred	United Kingdom	The ship sprang a leak and was beached at Milford Haven, Pembrokeshire.
Xulla	Norway	The ship ran aground on the Horn's Reef, in the Baltic Sea and was abandoned. Her crew were rescued. She was on a voyage from Söderhamn, Sweden to London. She subsequently broke up.
Unnamed	France	The schooner was wrecked at Kirkcaldy, Fife.
Unnamed	United Kingdom	The fishing trawler capsized off Greenock, Renfrewshire with the loss of all four crew.
Unnamed	Flag unknown	The ship was discovered in the North Sea in a capsized condition. She was beached at Hornsea, Yorkshire.
Unnamed	United States	The schooner foundered in Lake Ontario with the loss of all eight crew.
Unnamed	Flag unknown	The barque was driven ashore in the Pentland Firth.
Unnamed	United Kingdom	The schooner was driven ashore at Birchington, Kent.
