= Annika (disambiguation) =

Annika is a feminine given name.

Annika may also refer to:

- Annika (1984 TV series), a British miniseries
- Annika (2021 TV series), a Scottish crime drama series
- The ANNIKA, a women's professional golf tournament in Florida on the LPGA Tour
- Annika, stage name of Annika Wedderkopp (born 2004), Danish actress and singer
- 817 Annika, asteroid

== See also ==
- Annika Invitational Europe, an annual amateur golf tournament in Sweden for European girls under 18
