= Anikin =

Anikin (Russian: Аникин), feminine: Anikina (Аникина) is a Russian patronymic surname derived from the Russian diminutive Anika (Russian: Аника) for the given name Anikey. Notable people with this surname include:

== Anikin ==
- Aleksandr Anikin (diplomat) (1917–1970), Soviet diplomat
- Aleksandr Aleksandrovich Anikin (born 1960), Russian prosecutor
- Aleksandr Fyodorovich Anikin (born 1945), Soviet-Kazakhstani boxer and boxing coach
- Aleksandr Anikin (linguist) (born 1952), Russian linguist
- Andrey Anikin (1927–2001), Russian-Soviet economist
- Gennady Viktorovich Anikin (1928–1982), Soviet literary academic
- Georgy Antonovich Anikin (1898–1938), Russian-Soviet politician
- Igor Valerievich Anikin (born 1968), Russian theoretical physicist
- Ilya Yosypovych Anikin (born 1934), Soviet-Ukrainian artist
- Nikolay Aleksandrovich Anikin (1919–1977), Soviet soldier
- Nikolay Andreevich Anikin (1919–1997), Soviet soldier
- Nikolay Grigorievich Anikin (1935–2024), Soviet politician
- Nikolay Anikin (1932–2009), Soviet cross-country skier
- Nikolay Ilyich Anikin (1904–?), Soviet soccer player
- Pavel Anikin (1873–1938), Russian Empire–Soviet politician
- Pavel Evgrafovich Anikin (1827–1891), Russian Empire engineer, architect, and politician
- Roman Borisovich Anikin (born 1980), Russian sports shooter
- Sergey Anikin (1973—2000), Russian police officer
- Stepan Anikin (died 1919), Russian-Soviet writer and politician
- Valeriy Anikin (born 1947), Soviet-Russian scientist and mathematician
- Vasily Anikich Anikin (1897–1980), Soviet teacher
- Vasily Vasilyevich Anikin (born 1952), Soviet wrestler
- Viktor Anikin (1918–1997), Soviet-Belarusian architect
- Vladimir Anikin (soccer player) (born 1983), Uzbekistani soccer player
- Vladimir Anikin (weightlifter) (1946–?), Soviet weightlifter
- Vladimir Ivanovich Anikin (1941–2022), Soviet-Russian economist
- Vladimir Prokopyevich Anikin (1924–2018), Soviet-Russian philologist
- Vladimir Vasilyevich Anikin (1914–1976), Soviet political figure
- Yevgeniy Anikin (1958–2023), Soviet athlete
- Yevgeniy Anikin (architect) (1825–1889), Russian Empire architect

== Anikina ==
- Emilia Anikina (1886–1983), Russian Empire–Soviet agriculturalist
- Lydia Iosifovna Anikina (1917–2007), Belarusian architect
- Liza Anikina (born 1997), Russian journalist
- Marina Anikina (born 1985), Russian writer
- Natalia Ivanovna Anikina (1947–2026), Russian art critic
- Olga Anikina (born 1976), Russian writer and translator

== See also ==
- Anikeyev
