= SS Citta di Napoli =

A number of steamships were named Citta di Napoli, including:

- SS Citta di Napoli (1869), in service 1888–91
- SS Citta di Napoli (1871), in service 1902–10
