= Waren =

Waren may refer to:

- Waren (Müritz) a town and climatic spa in the state of Mecklenburg-Vorpommern, Germany
- Waren (port), a seaport in Northumberland, England
