= Joanikije =

Joanikije (Serbian Cyrillic: Јоаникије) is the Serbian variant of Greek name Ioannikios. It may refer to:

- Joanikije I, Serbian archbishop (1272–76)
- Joanikije II, Serbian archbishop (1338–46) and first Serbian Patriarch (1346–54)
- Joanikije III (c. 1700–1793), Archbishop of Peć and Serbian Patriarch, later Ecumenical Patriarch
- Joanikije of Devič, 15th-century Serbian Orthodox saint
- Joanikije Lipovac (1890–1945), Metropolitan of Montenegro and Serbian Orthodox saint
- Joanikije Mićović (born 1959), current Metropolitan of Montenegro and the Littoral
- Joanikije Pamučina (1810-1870), Serbian Orthodox bishop and writer from Herzegovina
