= Anica =

Anica (Serbian: Аница) is a female given name used among Romanians, Serbs, Slovenes, Croats, etc. It is derived from Anna. A regional variant of this name is Ance (Lithuanian), and it is closely related to the names Anicka, Anika and Anka. Notable people with the name include:

- Anica Bošković (1714–1804), Ragusan writer
- Anica Černej (1900–1944), Slovene author and poet
- Anica Dobra (born 1963), Serbian film actress
- Anica Kovač née Martinović, Croatian model, Miss Croatia 1995
- Anica Neto (born 1972), Angolan handball player
- Anica Nonveiller (born 1957), Serbian-born Canadian journalist, writer and producer
- Anica Savić Rebac (1892–1953), Serbian writer, classical philologist and translator
- Anica Mrose Rissi, American author
