= Anikeyev =

Anikeyev, also transliterated as Anikeev (feminine: Anikeyeva, Anikeeva) is a Russian language surname derived from the Russian colloquial form Anikey (Аникей) for the Greek-language given name Ioannikiy (Иоанникий, Ἰωαννίκιος, Ioannikios). Notable people with the surname include:

- Aleksandr Anikeyev
- Andrey Anikeyev (born 1961), Russian politician
- Ekaterina Anikeeva (born 1969), Russian Olympic water polo player
- Grigory Anikeyev (born 1972), Russian politician
- Ivan Anikeyev (1933–1992), Soviet cosmonaut
- Polina Anikeeva (born 1982), Professor of Material Science & Engineering as well as Brain & Cognitive Sciences at the Massachusetts Institute of Technology (MIT).
- Sibyl Anikeef (1896–1997), American photographer, alternative married name spelling Anikeyev
- Vladimir Anikeyev
- Yuri Anikeev (born 1983), Ukrainian International Grandmaster (GMI) of International and Brazilian draughts.
