= Anikey =

Anikey (Russian: Аникей) is a Russian masculine given name, a colloquial form of the given name Anikiy of Greek origin, whose official form, especially used as a monastic name, is Ioannikiy (Иоанникий, Ἰωαννίκιος, Ioannikios). Its diminutives include Anika, Anikeyka. It may also be a surname. The patronymic surname Anikeyev is derived from it. Surnames of related origin are Anikiyev, Anikin, Anikovich, Anikeyenko, Anikenko , Anikiyenko.

Notable people with the name include:

- Anikey Stroganov (1488–1570), Russian explorer, merchant and monk
- Svetlana Anikey, Belarusian actress
