= Budle Bay =

- Bay
- Location in Northumberland
- Coordinates: 55.625°N 1.745°W
- Grid position: NZ150360
- Location: Northumberland, England, UK

Budle Bay is a 1 mile (1.6 km) wide bay on the North Sea in Northumberland, England, between Bamburgh to the southeast and Lindisfarne to the northwest.

The bay is roughly square in plan opening to the North Sea along its northeastern side. Budle Point forms its eastern extremity. It is overlooked by Bamburgh Castle Golf Club at this point and by the Northumberland Coast Path and St Oswald's Way which share a common route in this vicinity. Waren Burn enters the bay at its southern corner whilst Ross Low, a smaller burn enters from the western corner. The two streams meet in the intertidal zone and continue east to the low water mark as Budle Water. The bay forms a part of the Lindisfarne National Nature Reserve. It is also a part of the Goswick-Holy Island-Budle Bay GCR site These are sites listed in the Geological Conservation Review as being of national importance; in this case for its coastal geomorphology.

It is underlain by limestone and other rock types of the Alston Formation though these are not exposed except along parts of its southeastern shore. The quartz-microgabbro of the Whin Sill occupies the higher ground on this southeastern side of the bay. There are extensive deposits of blown sand forming Ross Links at the opposite side of the bay and much of the bedrock on the southeastern side is obscured by similar dune deposits.

A seaport existed in Budle Bay up to the early twentieth century variously called Waren, Warenmouth and Warenquay.
