= Anicka =

Anicka is a feminine given name. Notable people with the given name include:

- Anicka Castañeda (born 1999), Filipina footballer
- Anicka Delgado (born 2002), Ecuadorian swimmer
- Anicka van Emden (born 1986), Dutch retired judoka
- Anicka Newell (born 1993), Canadian track and field
- Anicka Yi (born 1971), South Korean conceptual artist

== See also ==
- Anica
- Anika
