= Anika =

Anika is a female given name of various origins. It is also an alternative spelling of the name Annika or Anikha. It is also a diminutive of the Russian masculine given name Anikey.

== People ==
- Anika Apostalon (born 1995), Czech-American swimmer
- Anika Bozicevic (born 1972), Swedish footballer
- Anika Chebrolu (born 2006), Indian American child scientist
- Anika Kolan (born 2006), American cricketer
- Anika Larsen (born 1973), American actress and singer
- Anika Moa (born 1980), New Zealand musician
- Anika Niederwieser (born 1992), Italian handballer
- Anika Nilles (born 1983), German drummer, composer, solo musician, and musical educator
- Anika Omphroy, American politician elected to the Florida House of Representatives in 2018
- Anika Rodríguez (born 1997), American-born Mexican footballer
- Anika Noni Rose (born 1972), African-American singer and actress
- Anika Schwörer (born 2001), Swiss volleyball player
- Anika Taher, Miss Bangladesh 1994
- Anika Tiplady (born 1980), New Zealand former rugby union player
- Anika Wells (born 1985), Australian politician

== Fictional or mythical characters ==
- Anika Calhoun, on the Fox TV series Empire
- Anika the Warrior, a knight errant character in Russian fairy tales
- Anika Kayoko, a character from the movie Scream VI
- Anika Johnson, from the show The Summer I Turned Pretty
- Princess Anika, from the movie Barbie and the Magic of Pegasus

== See also ==
- Anikha Surendran (born 2004), Indian actress
- Annika
- Aneka
- Aneeka
- Anica
- Anicka
