= Annika Bryn =

Swedish author and freelance journalist

Annika Bryn (born 1945) is a Swedish author and freelance journalist. Bryn has written several short stories in magazines and freelance articles in newspapers, as well as a crime fiction novel series.

== Life ==
Bryn was born to a Swedish mother and a Norwegian father, active in the resistance against the German occupation of Norway in World War II. After divorce, the father moved to the United States and became a U.S. citizen.

== Books ==
- Den sjätte natten (The Sixth Night) 2003; thriller. Translated into Norwegian 2004 and German (Die sechste Nacht) 2005. First book in the series of leading protagonist Margareta Davidsson.
- Brottsplats Rosenbad (Crime Scene Rosenbad) Swedish, 2005. Rosenbad is the government building in Stockholm, Sweden. Second book in the series of Margareta Davidsson.
- Morden i Buttle (The Murders in Buttle), Swedish, 2006. Buttle is a small village on the island Gotland. Third book in the series of Margareta Davidsson.
