= Kramfors =

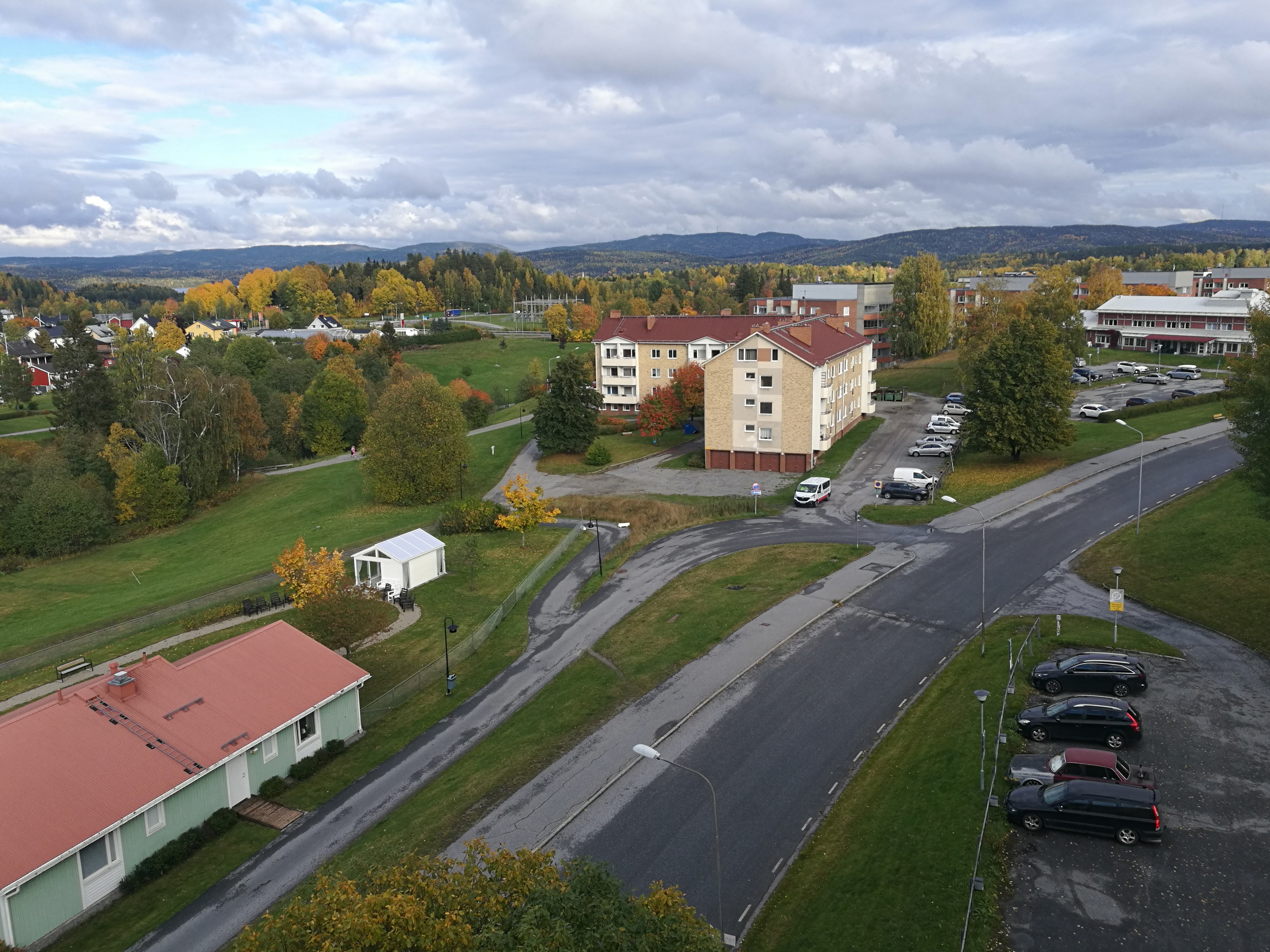
- Kramfors

- Location within Västernorrland Location within Sweden
- Coordinates: 62°56′N 17°48′E
- Country: Sweden
- Province: Ångermanland
- County: Västernorrland County
- Municipality: Kramfors Municipality

Area
  - Total: 7.34 km^{2} (2.83 sq mi)

Population (31 December 2010)
  - Total: 5,990
  - Density: 816/km^{2} (2,110/sq mi)
- Time zone: UTC+1 (CET)
  - Summer (DST): UTC+2 (CEST)
- Climate: Dfb
- Website: kramfors.se

Kramfors (Swedish: [ˈkrɑ̂ːmfɔʂ]) is a locality and the seat of Kramfors Municipality in Västernorrland County, Sweden. It had a population of 5,990 inhabitants in 2010.

The town grew on the western bank of the Ångerman river in the 19th century as harvested logs were floated downriver to be processed at local sawmills and pulp mills. Christopher Kramm introduced the river's first steam-driven saw, naming it after himself. The name of the town in turn derives from his name and the word fors ("rapid"). In the 1960s and 1970s, as the timber industry went into decline, the population of Kramfors declined as well.

The original settlement of Kramfors was located in Gudmundrå municipality, but in 1889 received the status of a so-called municipalsamhälle or borough, still remaining part of the original municipality. In 1947 it was awarded city status, one of the last in the country to do so. Since municipal reform in 1974, it serves as the seat of Kramfors Municipality.

The municipality of Kramfors has about 20,000 inhabitants, and is situated almost in the middle of Sweden's east coast in Northern Sweden. Within 100 kilometres from Kramfors there is a population of about 250,000 people, and within 200 kilometres about half a million people, and the large Norrland towns of Sundsvall and Umeå are within commuting distance.

Kramfors is known for its High Coast landscape, which has been given World Heritage status, and which provides the inhabitants with the opportunity of an outdoors lifestyle.

One of the tennis academies of Sweden is situated in Kramfors.

Kramfors also hosts the Folke Bernadotte Academy, a government agency focused on improving international conflict and crisis management, with a special interest in peace operations. It offers courses in peacekeeping intelligence and information operations that are open to all nations and to non-governmental organizations.

== Notable people ==
- Sune Bergman (1952–2021), former professional ice hockey player.
- Einar Blidberg (1906–1993), a Swedish Navy officer.
- Erika Grahm (born 1991), former professional ice hockey player.
- Mario Kempe (born 1988), current KHL player for the HC Dinamo Minsk.
- Adrian Kempe (born 1996), current NHL player for the Los Angeles Kings.
- Sandra Näslund (born 1996), a freestyle skier.
- Mattias Norlinder (born 2000), current NHL player for the Montreal Canadiens.
- Anna Olsson (born 1976), Winter Olympic cross-country skier.
- Gunnar Östberg (1923–2017), Winter Olympic cross-country skier.
- Tobias Viklund (born 1986), professional ice hockey player.
- Magnus Wernblom (born 1973), former professional ice hockey player.
