= Ivar Østberg =

Norwegian politician

Ivar Østberg (15 November 1942, Fredrikstad – 5 August 2023) was a Norwegian politician for the Christian Democratic Party.

He was elected to the Norwegian Parliament from Troms in 1997, and was re-elected in 2001.

Østberg was a member of Harstad city council during the term 1979 to 1983 and 1983–1987, serving as deputy mayor from 1983 to 1985.
