= Annika Fohn =

German politician (born 1987)

Member of the Landtag of North Rhine-Westphalia
- Incumbent
- Assumed office 1 June 2022
- Preceded by: Armin Laschet
- Constituency: Aachen II

Personal details
- Born: 9 February 1987 (age 39)
- Party: Christian Democratic Union (since 2013)
- Education: RWTH Aachen University

Annika Fohn (born 9 February 1987) is a German politician serving as a member of the Landtag of North Rhine-Westphalia since 2022. She has served as chairwoman of the Christian Democratic Union in Aachen since 2023.

In May 2026, Fohn was appointed as a full member of the European Committee of the Regions (CoR), representing the state of North Rhine-Westphalia. In this role, she participates in the EU’s advisory body that represents local and regional authorities and contributes to European legislation.

Within the Committee of the Regions, she is a member of the Commission for Citizenship, Governance, Institutional and External Affairs (CIVEX) as well as the Commission for Economic Policy (ECON).
