= Annika Idström =

Finnish writer, screenwriter and translator

Annika Idström (12 November 1947, Helsinki — 20 September 2011, Helsinki) was a Finnish author, dramaturg, and translator.

== Early life and education ==
Ilse Annika Idström was born to a Swedish-speaking family in Helsinki, and went to school at the private, Swedish language Laguska Skolan, graduating in 1968.

Afterwards, she studied scriptwriting at the University of Art and Design Helsinki (now part of the Aalto University School of Arts, Design and Architecture), graduating in 1974.

== Literary works ==
Despite being a Swedish-speaking Finn by background, Idström wrote mostly in the Finnish language, due to her strong relationship with her Finnish-speaking grandmother.

Her debut novel was Sinitaivas (1980) (lit. 'Blue Sky').

Idström's breakthrough work is considered to be Veljeni Sebastian ('My Brother Sebastian') (1985). That, along with another notable novel of hers, Kirjeitä Trinidadiin (1989) ('Letters to Trinidad'), were nominated for the Finlandia Prize literary award.

She wrote five novels, several TV and radio dramas, as well as translating prose and poetry from Danish and Norwegian into Finnish.

Often writing in the voice of a child, Idström's output centred on strong emotions such as hatred and violence, as well as family relations.

Her works were unconventional in approach, dealing with dark and difficult themes, and blurring the boundary between internal and external observations.

== Non-writing career ==
In 1976–1977, Idström ran the Nuoren Voiman Liitto literary association.

From 1984 to 1986, she lectured in Finnish language and literature at the University of Minnesota.

She also worked as a freelance director in the drama department of the Finnish public broadcaster Yle.

== Honours and awards ==
In 1985, Idström received the Finnish State Literature Prize (Kirjallisuuden valtionpalkinto).

In 1996, she was awarded the Pro Finlandia medal of the Order of the Lion of Finland.
