= Annika Larsson =

Annika Larsson (born 1972 Stockholm, Sweden) is a photographer and video artist.

Larsson received a Master of Fine Arts from the Royal University College of Fine Arts, Stockholm. In 2002 she had a solo exhibition at the Institute of Contemporary Arts in London. In 2014 she had another solo exhibition at the Museo d'Arte Contemporanea di Roma in Rome. Her work was included in the 58th Venice Biennale.

In an interview with the Independent newspaper she said, "a cliché is something that we are supposed to see in a certain way. When you get close to it, it can have a new meaning - it is that twist I am interested in".
