= Joannicius =

Joannicius, also Ioannikios (Greek: Ιωαννίκιος), Joanikije (Serbian: Јоаникије), Ioannikiy (Russian: Иоанникий), Anikey (Russian: Аникей), Anikiy (Russian: Аникий), Ioannykiy (Ukrainian: Іоанникій), Onykiy (Ukrainian: Оникій), may refer to:

- Joannicius the Great, 8th-century Byzantine Christian saint
- Joannicius of Ochrid, Archbishop of Ohrid (13th century)
- Joannicius of Devič, died 1430
- Patriarch Joannicius I of Constantinople, reigned 1524–1525
- Patriarch Joannicius II of Constantinople, reigned four times in 1646–1656
- Patriarch Joannicius III of Constantinople, reigned 1761–1763; Patriarch of the Serbs 1739–1746
- Patriarch Joannicius of Alexandria, Greek Patriarch of Alexandria 1645–1657
- Joannicius, Metropolitan of Moscow, reigned 1882–1891

== See also ==
- Joanikije, a given name
