= Gunnar Östberg =

Swedish cross-country skier

Gunnar Östberg (4 February 1923 – 25 December 2017) was a Swedish cross-country skier who competed in the 1950s. He finished ninth in the 18 km event at the 1952 Winter Olympics in Oslo. He was born in Kramfors, Ångermanland.
