= 817 Annika =

Main-belt asteroid

Discovery
- Discovered by: M. F. Wolf
- Discovery site: Heidelberg Obs.
- Discovery date: 6 February 1916

Designations
- Pronunciation: /ˈænɪkə/ German: [ˈanikaː]
- Named after: a girl named "Anika"
- Alternative designations: A916 · CD 1916 YW
- Minor planet category: main-belt · (middle); background · Eunomia

Orbital characteristics
- Epoch 31 May 2020 (JD 2459000.5)
- Uncertainty parameter 0
- Observation arc: 103.99 yr (37,982 d)
- Aphelion: 3.0570 AU
- Perihelion: 2.1231 AU
- Semi-major axis: 2.5900 AU
- Eccentricity: 0.1803
- Orbital period (sidereal): 4.17 yr (1,523 d)
- Mean anomaly: 61.065°
- Mean motion: 0° 14^{m} 11.4^{s} / day
- Inclination: 11.336°
- Longitude of ascending node: 125.47°
- Argument of perihelion: 285.18°

Physical characteristics
- Dimensions: 22.0 km × 22.0 km
- Mean diameter: 22.05±1.7 km; 22.891±0.100 km; 23.02±0.34 km
- Mean density: ~2.7 g/cm^{3} (estimate)
- Synodic rotation period: 10.560±0.004 h; 10.564±0.001 h
- Geometric albedo: 0.163±0.006; 0.1740±0.030; 0.191±0.027
- Spectral type: S (S3OS2-TH); Sl (S3OS2-BB)
- Absolute magnitude (H): 10.60; 10.80

817 Annika (prov. designation: A916 CD or 1916 YW) is a background asteroid in the region of the Eunomia family, located in the central portion of the asteroid belt. It was discovered on 6 February 1916, by German astronomer Max Wolf at the Heidelberg-Königstuhl State Observatory in southwest Germany. The stony S-type asteroid (Sl) has a rotation period of 10.56 hours and measures approximately 23 kilometers (14 miles) in diameter .

== Orbit and classification ==
Annika is a non-family asteroid of the main belt's background population when applying the hierarchical clustering method (HCM) to its proper orbital elements by Nesvorný as well as by Milani and Knežević (AstDyS). In the 1995 HCM-analysis by Zappalà, however, Annika is a member of the Eunomia family (502), a prominent family of stony asteroids and the largest one in the intermediate main belt with more than 5,000 members. It orbits the Sun in the central main-belt at a distance of 2.1–3.1 AU once every 4 years and 2 months (1,523 days; semi-major axis of 2.59 AU). Its orbit has an eccentricity of 0.18 and an inclination of 11° with respect to the ecliptic. The body's observation arc begins with its official discovery observation at Heidelberg Observatory on 6 February 1916.

== Naming ==
"Annika" is a common German feminine given name. Any reference to a person or occurrence for the naming of this minor planet is unknown.

=== Unknown meaning ===
Among the many thousands of named minor planets, Annika is one of 120 asteroids for which no official naming citation has been published. All of these asteroids have low numbers, the first being 164 Eva. The last asteroid with a name of unknown meaning is 1514 Ricouxa. They were discovered between 1876 and the 1930s, predominantly by astronomers Auguste Charlois, Johann Palisa, Max Wolf and Karl Reinmuth.

== Physical characteristics ==
In the Tholen-like taxonomy of the Small Solar System Objects Spectroscopic Survey (S3OS2), Annika is a common, stony S-type asteroid, while in the SMASS-like taxonomic variant of the S3OS2 survey, it is an Sl-subtype which transitions from the S-type to the uncommon L-type asteroid.

=== Rotation period ===
In October 2002, a rotational lightcurve of Annika was obtained from photometric observations by Colin Bembrick at Mount Tarana Observatory (431), Australia, in collaboration with Greg Bolt and Tom Richards near Perth and Melbourne, respectively. Lightcurve analysis gave a well-defined rotation period of 10.560±0.004 hours with a brightness variation of 0.27±0.02 magnitude (U=3). This period was confirmed by Gérald Rousseau in March 2012, who determined a very similar period of 10.564±0.001 hours with an amplitude of 0.16±0.02 magnitude (U=3).

=== Diameter and albedo ===
According to the surveys carried out by the Infrared Astronomical Satellite IRAS, the NEOWISE mission of NASA's Wide-field Infrared Survey Explorer (WISE), and the Japanese Akari satellite, Annika measures (22.05±1.7), (22.891±0.100) and (23.02±0.34) kilometers in diameter and its surface has an albedo of (0.1740±0.030), (0.191±0.027) and (0.163±0.006), respectively. The Collaborative Asteroid Lightcurve Link derives an albedo of 0.2062 and a diameter of 22.20 kilometers based on an absolute magnitude of 10.6. Alternative mean-diameter measurements published by the WISE team include (17.65±4.40 km), (22.59±5.70 km), (24.38±0.50 km) and (26.569±0.191 km) with corresponding albedos of (0.26±0.13), (0.22±0.17), (0.187±0.025) and (0.1199±0.0098).

On 26 August 2010, an asteroid occultation of Annika gave a best-fit ellipse dimension of (22.0 km × 22.0 km). These timed observations are taken when the asteroid passes in front of a distant star. However, these two observations have received a poor quality rating.
