= SS Silesia (1869) =

Hammonia class steamship

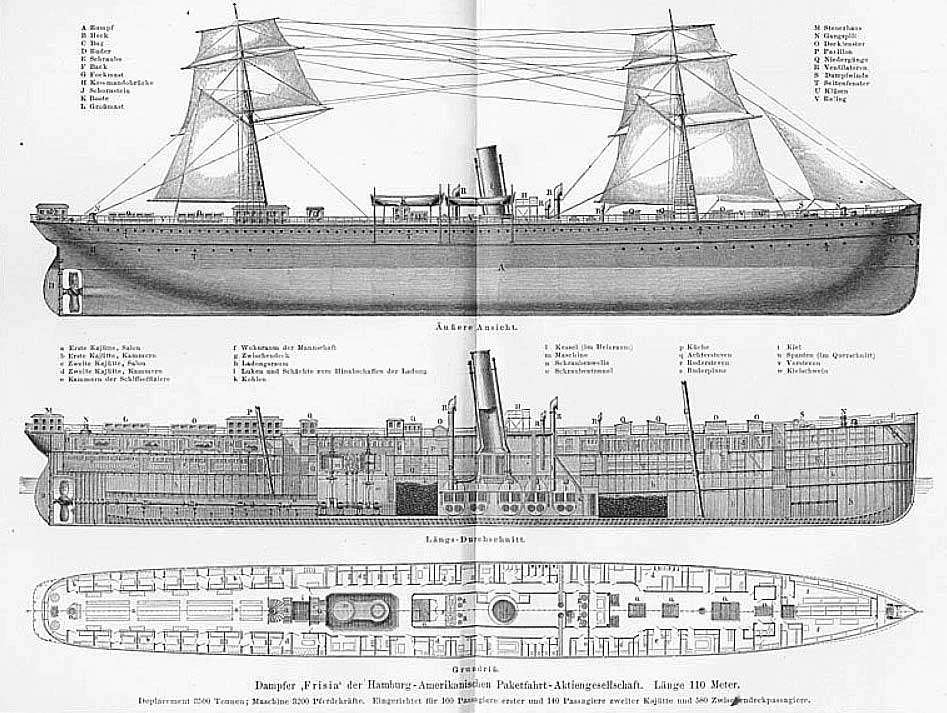
- A Hammonia class ship, the SS Silesia appeared very much like the ship pictured here, the SS Frisia

History

/ Hamburg / Germany
- Name: SS Silesia
- Namesake: the province of Silesia
- Operator: Hamburg Amerikanische Packetfahrt Actien Gesellschaft (HAPAG)
- Port of registry: Hamburg
- Route: Hamburg – Le Havre – New York City
- Builder: Caird & Co.
- Launched: 14 April 1869
- Christened: SS Silesia
- Maiden voyage: 23 June 1869
- Out of service: 1899
- Renamed: Pacifica (1887), Citta di Napoli (1888), Montevideo (1891)
- Refit: 1877, compound engines
- Fate: Transferred to Great Britain

United Kingdom
- Name: SS Pacifica
- Acquired: 1887
- Fate: Transferred to Italy

Italy
- Name: P/fo Citta di Napoli
- Owner: Fratelli Lavarello
- Acquired: 1888
- Fate: Acquired by new Italian owner

Italy
- Name: P/fo Montevideo
- Owner: La Veloce Line
- Acquired: 1891
- Home port: Genoa
- Fate: Wrecked off Lobos Island on the River Plate in Uruguay, 1899, then sold for scrap

General characteristics
- Class & type: Hammonia
- Tonnage: 3,142
- Length: 361 ft (110 m)
- Beam: 46 ft (14 m)
- Depth: 35.5 ft (10.8 m)
- Propulsion: Steam expansion (single screw) and two masts; later retrofitted with second screw
- Sail plan: Square rigged on both fore and main masts
- Speed: 12 knots (22 km/h))
- Capacity: 600 passengers

The SS Silesia was a late 19th-century Hamburg America Line passenger and cargo ship that ran between the European ports of Hamburg, Germany and Le Havre, France to Castle Garden and later Ellis Island, New York transporting European immigrants, primarily Russian, Prussian, Hungarian, German, Austrian, Italian, and Danish individuals and families. Most passengers on this route were manual laborers, including stonecutters, locksmiths, farmers, millers, upholsterers, confectioners, and tailors, though physicians and other professionals also bought passage on her.

== Building ==
Built by Caird & Company of Greenock, Scotland, the Silesia, along with the SS Germania (I) (1863), SS Germania (II) (1870), SS Frisia (1872), SS Pomerania (1873), SS Hammonia (I) (1855), and SS Hammonia (II) (1866), was a Hammonia class ship. Some sources report her as being 340 feet (100 m) in length and 40 feet (12 m) from side to side though other contemporary sources report her as somewhat larger.

With both a steam engine and a set of traditional masts, she was one of a brief but large category of "transitional" (wind-to-steam) vessels. Like many of these ships, the Silesia had a steel hull, two masts, and one steam funnel. Her two engines drove a single 10 ft (3.0 m) screw with 2,200 horsepower making 54 revolutions per minute. Twelve men shoveling coal continuously from her four coal bunkers kept her engines running around the clock, consuming 75 of her 1,100-ton capacity of coal per day. All of the steam generated in her boilers was recovered and reused during any given length of her journey. The smoke from the burning of coal quickly blackened many of her sails, which were as follows: on her foremast she had two staysails (a fore staysail and a fore topmast staysail), a course, topsail, and topgallant sail; and on her mainmast, the equivalent five sails (a staysail, topmast staysail, course, topsail, and topgallant sail) plus a spanker for a combined total of eleven sails.

== History ==
She began her maiden voyage from Hamburg to Le Havre and New York on 23 June 1869. On 5 January 1872, she ran aground at Dartmouth, Nova Scotia, Canada whilst on a voyage from New York to Hamburg. She was refloated. Silesia ran aground in the Elbe downstream of Blankenese on 24 April 1874 whilst on a voyage from New York to Hamburg. She had been refloated by 29 April and taken in to Hamburg. Her last voyage on this route began on 24 February 1875. After this she was fitted with a compound engine and supposedly began sailing the route from Hamburg to the West Indies, though passenger manifests continue to show her bringing immigrants to New York for many more years. On 17 February 1880, Silesia ran aground at Finkenwerder whilst on a voyage from Hamburg to New York. On 12 November that year she collided with and sank the Guernsey schooner Squale in the English Channel 12 nautical miles (22 km) south of Beachy Head, Sussex.

Accounts then differ as to the path of her ownership, with some sources claiming she was given to W.G. Armstrong & Mitchell Company in 1887 before being sold to the H.F. Swan Company who renamed her Pacifica, then in 1888 sold to A. Albini of Genoa, then in 1889 sold to Fratelli Lavarello, also of Genoa, and renamed Citta di Napoli, then in 1890 sold to the La Veloce Line, again of Genoa, and renamed Montevideo. Others record that once refitted she went to an unnamed British firm, then to an Italian company called Solari & Schiaffino, then year after that sold to Fratelli Lavarello, and then in 1891 sold to La Veloce.

Sources agree, however, that on 2 December 1899, she ran aground near the island of Lobos in the River Plate between Uruguay and Argentina and was eventually sold for scrap metal.
