= Annika Östberg =

Swedish criminal

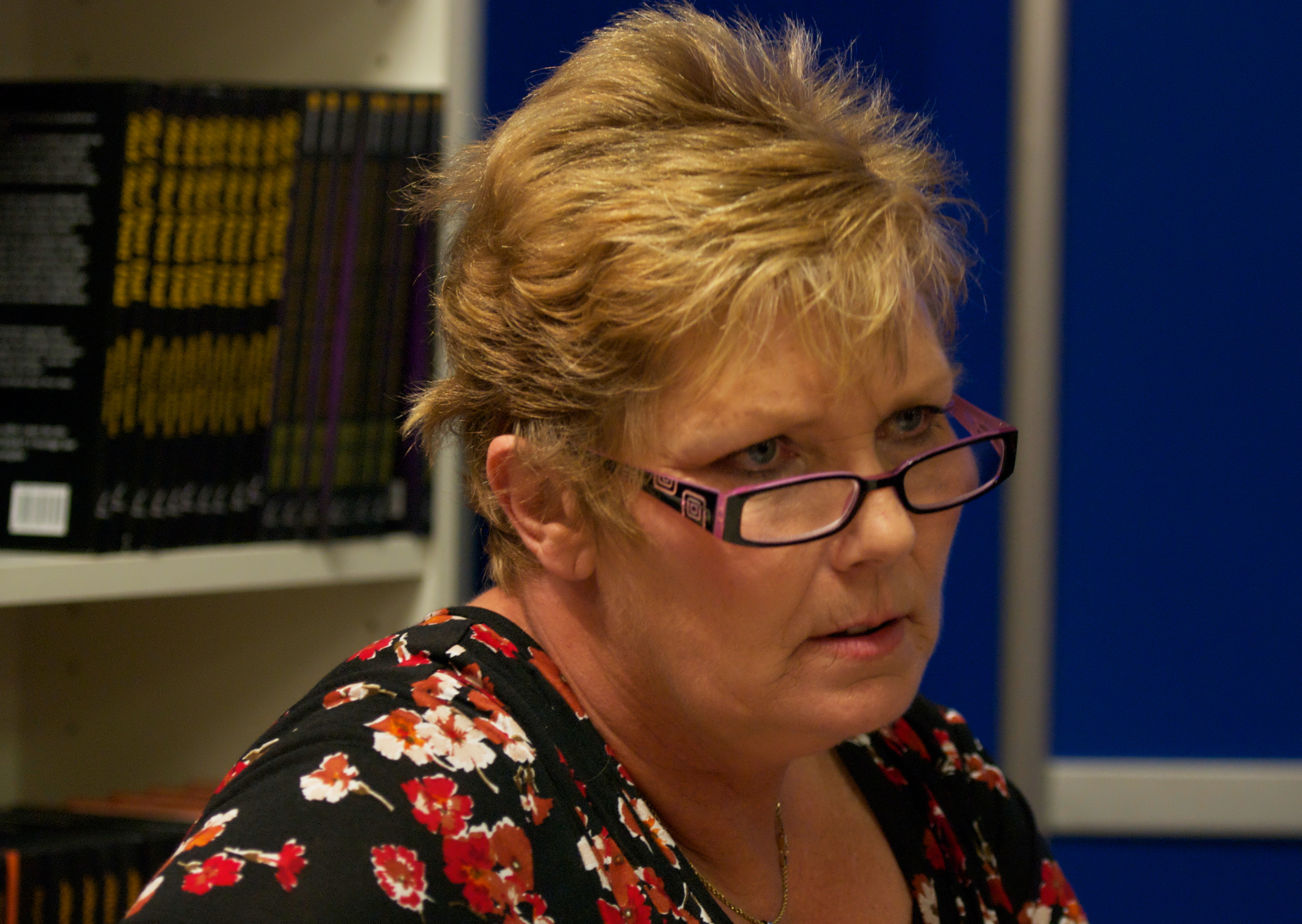
- Annika Östberg at the 2011 Göteborg Book Fair
- Born: January 6, 1954 (age 72); Stockholm, Sweden
- Status: Released
- Convictions: First degree murder (2 counts); Voluntary manslaughter
- Penalty: 25 years to life in prison; commuted to 45 years imprisonment

Details
- Victims: 3 (2 as an accomplice)
- Span of crimes: 1972–1981
- Country: United States
- State: California

Annika Maria Östberg Deasy (born January 6, 1954) is a Swedish citizen formerly incarcerated in California for an undetermined period (25 years to life sentence). She was convicted of first degree murder of a restaurant owner and a police officer in 1981 under the felony murder rule. In April 2009, after 27 years in a California prison, Östberg was handed over to Swedish authorities and transferred to Sweden, and incarcerated in the Hinseberg women's prison north of Örebro. She was released from prison in May 2011.

== Childhood and marriage ==
Annika Östberg grew up in Hässelby in Stockholm, and moved with her mother to California in the 1960s. She ran away from home to San Francisco, where she became a drug addict. She married Brian Deasy and gave up drugs, but when the marriage failed she resumed her drug habit.

== Prior criminal record ==
Östberg was convicted of theft in 1973 and received 18 months probation. Also in 1973, she was convicted of possession of a controlled substance and received three years probation. In 1976 she was convicted of providing liquor to a minor and received 12 months probation, one day in jail, and was ordered to pay a $65 fine.

In 1972, a man was stabbed to death in Östberg's apartment in San Francisco. Östberg pleaded guilty to voluntary manslaughter and received a 5-year suspended sentence. She later claimed that she'd only confessed to help her then-boyfriend.

== The murders ==
On April 30, 1981, Östberg and her boyfriend Bob Cox robbed and killed ex-restaurant owner Joe Torre. Östberg sold stolen meat to restaurants and had made an appointment in a warehouse with Torre. While she pretended to bring the meat out of the truck, Bob Cox shot him. They robbed Torre and drove away. When their vehicle broke down on the highway the next day, Sgt Helbush stopped to render aid. According to Lake County district attorney Lester Fleming, evidence exists that Östberg may have shot Sgt Helbush as he walked back to his patrol car. Östberg stated that while she pretended to search for her driver's licence, Cox shot Helbush in the back of the head. Östberg told Cox to get rid of the body. They stole the policeman's wallet and the police car.

A patrol soon found Helbush's body when he failed to report back. Policeman Don Anderson discovered his colleague's stolen police car on a road in the Cobb Mountain area. After a short pursuit, Cox crashed the stolen car on a sharp curve near intersection 175 at Dry Creek Road 38.759178°N 122.641701°W. During a shootout during which Östberg helped Cox to reload, Cox was wounded by several shots from the police and surrendered. Östberg tried to reach a gun before a police officer arrested her. Östberg explained the crimes in detail at her hearings and blamed her drug abuse. However, drug tests showed that she was not using narcotics at the time.

== Sentence ==
Cox committed suicide while in police custody in 1981. He took full responsibility for both murders in a suicide note. In 1983, Östberg pleaded guilty to two counts of first degree murder to avoid a possible death sentence. She received two concurrent terms of 25 years to life in prison. At that time it was customary for well-behaved prisoners to be set free after serving approximately half of their sentence. Documents from that period indicate that Östberg's lawyers believed she could be out after 12 ½ years. Previously, life prisoners served their sentences according to the law and their behavior in prison. However, this was not the case after 2000. Politics changed throughout the years, and as the sentencing laws changed, so did the mindset of the Board of Prison Terms and the Governor's office in Sacramento.

== Parole hearings ==
Östberg was denied parole and was refused transfer to Sweden in 1997, 2002, 2005, and 2008.

== Campaigns ==
Relatives of the victims, the police, and other Americans pushed for Östberg to remain in jail. They received support from California's Governor, who declared that she is a vicious killer. The Board of Prison Terms determined that Östberg was not ready for parole because she had acted in a cold-blooded manner and the motive was trivial. The Parole Board was critical of the Swedish media, who presented a one-sided view of Östberg.

Campaigns in Sweden urged for her sentence to be time-determined and that she be allowed to serve the remaining imprisonment in her home country. Claims were made that her sentence was inhumane, as Östberg was not the one who personally shot the restaurant owner and policeman, and that Östberg had served enough time for her involvement in the murders. In opposition to these claims, others note that Östberg plead guilty, that her sentence was fair and correct under California law, that her connection to Sweden is extremely limited, and that she has been treated no differently than any other inmate convicted of similar crimes.

== Swedish reactions ==
The Annika Östberg case upset many Swedes, since it is claimed that she was not armed and did not commit any murder. The Swedish media claimed that she was only present on the scene, and did not do anything, and was held as a scapegoat for her boyfriend, who committed suicide before his trial. It was written that she would not get any penalty at all if it was in Sweden. Relatives had contacted the media, and this version was initially used as they had trouble getting information from California. Later the Swedish media admitted to her having a higher degree of involvement in the episode. She implied that she committed the killings in statements to the police. She confessed to avoid death penalty, which would have been hard to avoid if she actually shot the victims.

Some believe that if she was convicted in Sweden she would get 6–7 years imprisonment as an accessory to murder. In another case in Sweden, the 1988 Åmsele murders, the girlfriend was sentenced to two years for doing nothing to prevent Juha Valjakkala from committing a triple murder. That girl did not reload a gun or similar, but just watched the murders silently. In that case the boyfriend was sentenced to lifetime in prison. Under California law she is just as culpable as her boyfriend because she was an active participant.

There has been criticism against the Swedish media, also in Sweden, who has decided to protect a Swedish woman, who has got a harsh treatment by foreign authorities. The criticism says that the media has avoided describing what she did during the events. Swedish media could not avoid writing in a way giving readers in Sweden. The well known police academy professor Leif GW Persson said: "She is a very heavy criminal. Media has touched that very gently. I assume that is because they want her to be released, then it is hard to do a correct description of the case."

== Transfer to Sweden and release ==
The question of being transferred to a Swedish prison is outside the scope of a parole hearing. California governor Arnold Schwarzenegger refused in an interview in August 2005 with Swedish television to let her be transferred to Sweden to serve the remaining period in her native country. In April 2009, she was finally transferred after years of silent diplomatic activity. It is believed that the financial crisis in the United States and the fact that prisoners are a burden on the economy was one reason for the transfer. Östberg became one of the first prisoners to be transferred under the new rules.

On November 16, 2009, a Swedish court decided that Östberg's sentence should be reduced to 45 years, allowing her to be released after serving two thirds of her sentence. Östberg was released from prison in May 2011, more than 30 years after her arrest. On August 8, 2010, Östberg hosted the program Sommar on Sveriges Radio. She was released on May 2, 2011, after having been locked up for 30 years, since May 1, 1981, a longer prison time than almost any Swedish citizen.

== Bibliography ==
- Östberg, Annika (2013). Se ljuset i det svarta (in Swedish). Stockholm: Ekerlid. ISBN 9789187391071. SELIBR 14130451.
- Östberg, Annika (2011). Ögonblick som förändrar livet (in Swedish). Stockholm: Ekerlid. ISBN 978-91-7092-181-0. SELIBR 12176641.
- Östberg, Annika; Swanberg, Lena Katarina (1999). Sorgfågel: Annika Östberg berättar sitt liv (in Swedish). Stockholm: DN. ISBN 91-7588-323-6. SELIBR 8375231.
