= Nanette =

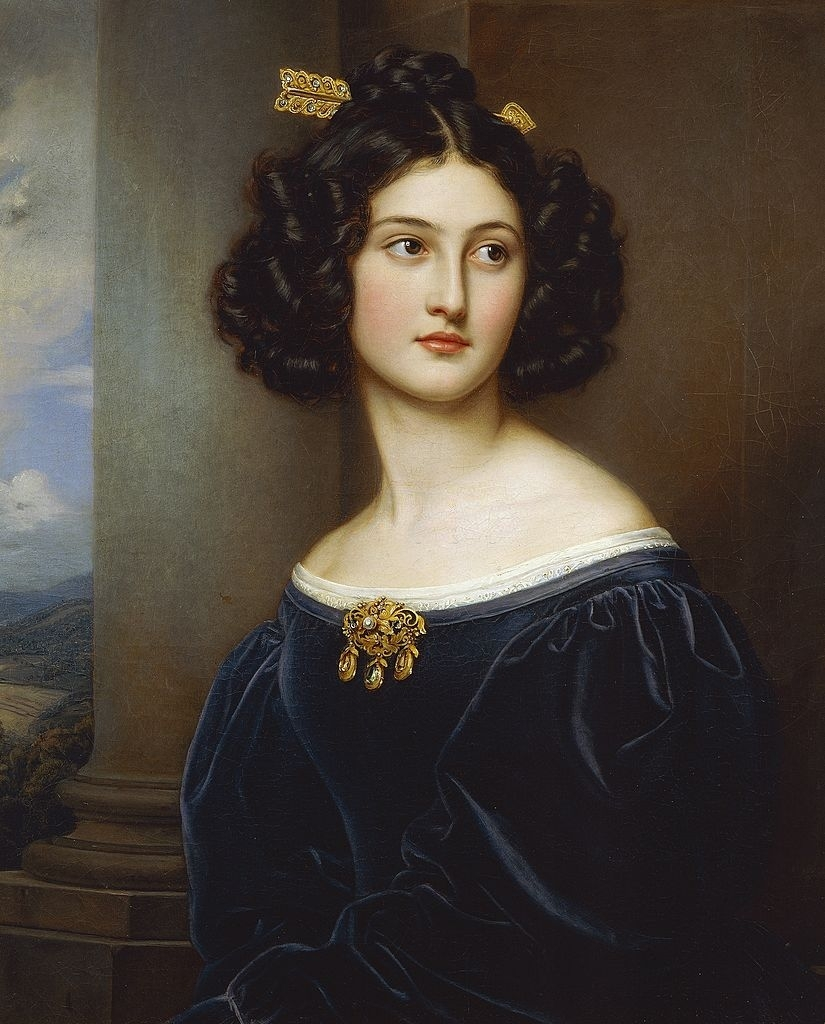
- Nanette Kaulla (1812-1872), painted by Joseph Karl Stieler. She was a famous beauty in Munich.
- Gender: Feminine
- Language: Dutch, English, German

Origin
- Meaning: Diminutive of Anna and Anne

Other names
- Related names: Ann, Anna, Anne, Anneke, Annette, Annie, Annika, Anouk, Anya, Hannah, Nan, Nancy, Nannerl, Nannie, Ninon

Nanette is a feminine given name, a Dutch, English, and German hypocorism for Anne that is also used as an independent given name.

Notable people with the name include:

- Nanette Barragán (born 1976), American attorney and politician
- Nanette le Besnerais (1896–1981), French tennis player
- Nanette Bordeaux (1911–1956), Canadian-born American actress
- Nanette Burstein (born 1970), American film and television director
- Nanette Carter (born 1954), American artist
- Nanette Salomons Cohen (1764–1833), grandmother of Karl Marx
- Nanette Cameron (1927–2023), New Zealand interior designer and educator
- Nanette Comstock (1866–1942), American actress
- Nanette M. DeRenzi, United States Navy admiral
- Nanette "Nan" Doak-Davis (born 1962), American runner
- Nanette Duncan (born 1947), Australian swimmer
- Nanette Fabray (1920–2018), American actress, comedian, singer, dancer and activist
- Nanette Gartrell, American psychiatrist and writer
- Nanette Guilford (1903–1990), American opera singer
- Nanette Hansen, American journalist
- Nanette Hanson (1941–1967), British teacher and Albert Medal recipient
- Nanette Hassall (born 1947), Australian dancer
- Nanette Inventor (born 1954), Filipino comedian, actress, singer, composer and writer
- Nannette Johnston (1782–18??), British actress
- Nanette Kay Laughrey (born 1946), American judge
- Nanette Kaulla (1812–1872)
- Nanette Blitz Konig (born 1929), Holocaust survivor
- Nanette L. Laitman (1924–2020), American art collector and philanthropist
- Nanette Lepore (born 1964), American fashion designer
- Nanette S. Levinson, American scholar
- Nanette Maxine, American singer
- Nanette McGuinness, American soprano and literary translator
- Nanette Medved (born 1970), American philanthropist, businesswoman and former actress
- Nanette Milne (born 1942), Scottish politician
- Nanette Newman (born 1934), English actress and writer
- Nanette B. Paul (1866-1928), American legal scholar, lawyer, suffragist, author, instructor, lecturer
- Nanette Rainone (1942–2016), American reporter and radio programmer
- Nanette Schechner (1804–1860), German operatic soprano
- Nanette Schutte (born 1962), Dutch tennis player
- Nanette Thomas (born 1956), Sierra Leonean politician
- Nanette "Nan" Stacy Waddy (1915–2015), Australian psychiatrist
- Nanette Wenger (born 1930), American clinical cardiologist
- Nanette Workman (born 1945), American singer-songwriter, actress and writer
- Nanette Wylde, American artist and writer

== Other uses ==
- List of storms named Nanette
- Nanette (show), stand-up act by Australian comedian Hannah Gadsby
- "Nanette: An Aside", a short story by Willa Cather
- No, No, Nanette, 1924 musical comedy
  - No, No, Nanette (1930 film)
  - No, No, Nanette (1940 film)

== See also ==
- 5852 Nanette, main-belt asteroid
- Nanetti
- Hilda Nanette Blanche Praeger Killby, British geneticist
