= Nannerl (given name) =

Feminine given name

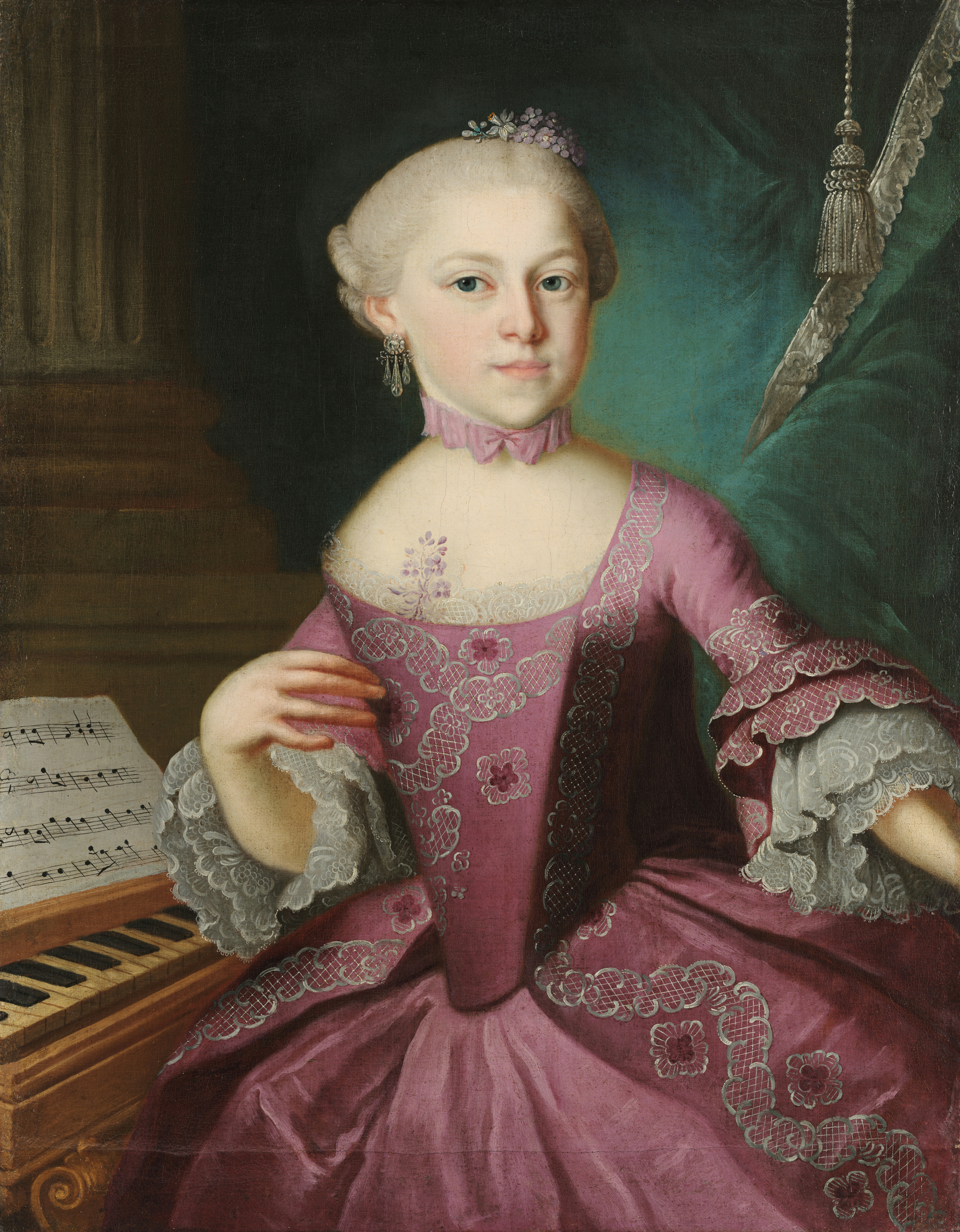
- Austrian musician Maria Anna Mozart (1751–1829) at age 12 in 1763. Her nickname was Nannerl.
- Gender: Feminine
- Language: German

Origin
- Meaning: Austro-Bavarian German hypocorism for Anna

Other names
- Nickname: Nan
- Related names: Ana (Georgian), (Spanish); Anano (Georgian); Aneta (Bulgarian),(Czech), (Macedonian), (Polish); Ani (Bulgarian), (Georgian), (Romanian), (Spanish); Ania (Polish), (Russian); Anica Croatian, Serbian, Slovene; Anika (Danish), (Dutch), (German), (Polish), (Slovene); Anikó (Hungarian); Anina (German), Anișoara (Romanian); Anita (Croatian), (Portuguese), (Slovene), (Spanish); Anja (Croatian), (Danish)), (Dutch), (Finnish), (German), (Norwegian), (Serbian),(Slovene), (Swedish), Anka (Bulgarian), (Croatian), (Serbian), (Slovene); Anke (Dutch), (Low German); Ankica (Croatian), (Serbian), (Slovene); Ann (English), (Manx); Anna, Anne (Basque), (Danish), (Dutch), (English), (Estonian), (Finnish), (French), (German), (Norwegian), (Swedish); Anneke (Dutch); Annelien (Dutch); Anneta (Greek); Annetta (Italian); Annette (Danish), (Dutch), (English), (French), (German), (Norwegian), (Swedish); Anni (Danish), (Estonian), (Finnish), (German), (Greek); Annie (Dutch), (English), (French); Anniina (Finnish); Annika (Dutch), (English), (Estonian), (Finnish), (German), (Greek), (Swedish); Annikki (Finnish); Annio (Greek); Annoula (Greek); Annya (Greek); Anouk Dutch, French; Anouschka (Dutch); Anouska (Dutch), Annukka (Finnish); Annushka (Russian); Annuska (Dutch), Anny (French); Ans (Dutch); Antje (Dutch), (Frisian), (Low German); Anu (Estonian), (Finnish); Anuki (Georgian); Anuša (Croatian), (Serbian), (Slovene language); Anuschka (Dutch), (German); Anya, Enija (Latvian); Hannah, Nainsí Irish; Nance (English); Nancy (English), (German); Nandag (Scottish Gaelic), Nanette (English), (German), Nannie (English); Nanse (Manx); Néné (French), (Jèrriais); Nénette (French), Nensi (Croatian), Ninette (English, (French); Nini (French), Ninon (French), Nuša Slovene; Ona (Lithuanian); Onnee (Manx); Panna (Hungarian); Panka (Hungarian); Panni (Hungarian)

Nannerl is an Austro-Bavarian Upper German language diminutive for the name Anna that is also in use as an independent given name. It is closely related to Nan, Nancy, Nanette, and Nannie, all English and German diminutives for Anna, Anne and Ann. The best known bearer of the nickname Nannerl was Austrian musician Maria Anna Mozart (1751–1829), the elder sister of composer Wolfgang Amadeus Mozart, after whom some other women were named. United States government data also shows that Nannerl was in use as an independent name as well as a diminutive for Anna and its variants by 1916.

The suffix -erl is also used in other Austro-Bavarian diminutives. To give some examples from Nannerl's time: her little brother was addressed as "Wolfgangerl"; Joseph Haydn as a child was "Sepperl" (second syllable), Haydn's 16-year-old pupil Josepha von Genzinger was "Peperl".

== Women ==
- Nannerl O. Keohane (born 1940), American political theorist and former college president
- Maria Anna Mozart, nicknamed "Nannerl" (1751–1829), Austrian musician and elder sister of Wolfgang Amadeus Mozart

== See also ==
- Nannerl Notenbuch, a practice book used by Maria Anna Mozart as a child
- Divertimento No. 11 (Mozart), also known as the Nannerl Septent, a composition by Wolfgang Amadeus Mozart
