= Anouk =

Anouk (French pronunciation: [anuk], Dutch pronunciation: [aːˈnuk]) is a French female given name and Dutch diminutive of the female given name Anna.

== People ==
- Anouk, or Anouk Schemmekes (née Teeuwe, born 1975), Dutch singer-songwriter
- Anouk Aimée (Nicole Françoise Florence Dreyfus; 1932–2024), pseudonym of a French film actress
- Anouk Andraska (born 2004), Swiss freestyle skier
- Anouk De Clercq (born 1971), Belgian multimedia artist
- Anouk Dekker (born 1986), Dutch footballer
- Anouk Denton (born 2003), English footballer
- Anouk van Dijk (born 1965), Dutch choreographer
- Anouk Eman (born 1992), Aruban psychologist, swimmer, model and beauty pageant titleholder
- Anouk Faivre-Picon (born 1986), French skier
- Anouk Ferjac (born 1932), French actress
- Anouk Geurts (born 2000), Belgian sailor
- Anouk Grinberg (born 1963), French actress
- Anouk Hagen (born 1990), Dutch sprinter
- Anouk Hoogendijk (born 1985), Dutch footballer
- Anouk Aimee Takam Kenmoe (born 1979), Cameroonian footballer
- Anouk Koevermans (born 2004), Dutch tennis player
- Anouk Kruithof (born 1981), Dutch artist
- Anouk Leblanc-Boucher (born 1984), Canadian athlete
- Anouk Loubie (born 1969), French slalom canoeist
- Anouk Masson Krantz, French/Dutch photographer and author
- Anouk Matton (Mattn), Belgian EDM DJ, singer, and record producer
- Anouk Mels (born 1971), Dutch softball player
- Anouk Nieuwenweg (born 1996), Dutch handballer
- Anouk Raes (born 1988), Belgian hockey player
- Anouk Renière-Lafrenière (born 1983), Canadian synchronized swimmer
- Anouk Ricard (born 1970), French comic book writer and illustrator
- Anouk Rijff (born 1996), Dutch cyclist
- Anouk Taggenbrock (born 1994), Dutch basketball player
- Anouk van de Wiel (born 1992), Dutch handball player
- Anouk Vergé-Dépré (born 1992), Swiss beach volleyball player
- Anouk Vetter (born 1993), Dutch athlete
- Anouk Whissell, part of the filmmaking trio RKSS

== See also ==
- Anuk
- Annick
