= Gene Caesar =

American author (1927–1986)

Eugene "Gene" Lee Caesar (1927–1986) was an American writer of outdoor fiction, American history and natural history. His biography of Jim Bridger, King of the Mountain Men, won the Bronze Wrangler for Outstanding Western Juvenile Book in 1961. In 1970, Caesar left his freelance career to work in the Michigan House of Representatives as a legislative analyst and later an education specialist to the Speaker of the House.

== Biography ==
Eugene Lee Caesar was born on December 10, 1927 in Saginaw, Michigan to Ernest Thor Caesar and Eunice Lee Caesar (née Eunice Viola Lee), author of For This My Mother Wrapped Me Warm (D. Appleton-Century 1947) and many short stories for popular magazines such as Collier's and the Women's Home Companion.

When the United States entered World War II, Caesar enlisted at the Office of Naval Officer Procurement. Under the V-5 program he attended Michigan Central College of Education, Case Institute of Technology and Illinois Institute of Technology. After his discharge in mid-1946, he spent a year at the University of Miami before returning to Michigan to write.

Gene Caesar's working history began, in his own words, 'as a pots-and-pans salesman for Macy's in late 1946.' He 'ran through everything from serving as a United Auto Workers committeeman in a General Motors plant to playing in small hillbilly or Western orchestras, and ended as a jet-aircraft mechanic for Republic Aviation in 1954–55.' Caesar worked a variety of jobs, including machine operator and aircraft mechanic, before the success of his first novel, Mark of the Hunter.

In 1970, Gene left his freelance writing career to serve as a legislative analyst for the Michigan House of Representatives and, later, an education specialist for the Speaker of the House. He is honored for his public service in House Concurrent Resolution No. 653. Gene Caesar died of a cerebral aneurysm on January 26, 1986, in Lansing, Michigan.

== Personal life ==
Caesar married Judith May Hall in Ann Arbor, Michigan on December 26, 1953. Following the wedding, the couple moved to New York City where Judy studied dance at the Metropolitan Opera School of Ballet, and Gene worked on the jet-aircraft engines while writing fiction at night. They later settled in Ann Arbor, where Judy opened a dance school and Gene wrote full-time. The couple had three children: Cheryl, Craig and Jeffrey.

== Writings ==
Although Caesar published outdoor stories and articles in men's magazines like True and youth publications like Boys' Life throughout the 1950s and 1960s, his first successful novel, Mark of the Hunter, dates from 1953. In Michigan in Literature, Clarence A. Andrews summarizes thus: "After he meets a young woman, Pat Brodie, [veteran Marty Jevons] is able to accept society and even conservative politics, and he achieves release from his compulsive wolf hunting." Andrews notes that "[r]eviewers were pleased with the hunting scenes, but unhappy with the novel's larger philosophical solutions, citing the opinion of Nicholas Mongo in the Saturday Review of Literature: "'When [Caesar] ascribes the dynamics of social dissatisfaction and liberal strivings wholly to sexual motivation in disguise, he robs love and politics alike of their share of will and reason.'" The Virginia Quarterly Review, on the other hand, praised the work as a "fresh and vigorous first novel, executed with commendable and comforting assurance, [in which] Mr. Caesar handles an old problem in a new way: the readjustment to civilian life of a soldier back from the war." Marty Jevons, this reviewer finds, is not seeking primitivism for its own sake, but the venerable American goal of self-reliance, exemplified by the hero's pioneer grandfather. This theme carries through in a "convincing and acceptable conclusion" rendered with "a determined and often exciting skill. [The author's] style is direct; his manner is wholly modern; his characters, even the minor figures who are often mere types, come alive under his fingers."

In The Wild Hunters: The Wolves, the Bears and the Big Cats (1957), Caesar turns his focus to animals as hunters, rather than hunted. This popular work of natural history was billed by the Reading Eagle as an "exciting and suspenseful account of the wild predators of North America – the wolves, the bears, and the big cats," The Science News Letter, published by the Society for Science and the Public, concurred, stating that the book aims "to interest the public in the fate of these wild creatures who face extinction because they are so ruthlessly being killed in the belief that they are evil." The Journal of Wildlife Management praised the work and its aims, agreeing with Caesar's recommendations that, to save the wild predators from extinction, the U.S. government should stop spending money on bounties and poisoning, reapportioning a part of that expense to research into wildlife. Reviewer Olaus J. Murray concludes: "Perhaps our hope lies in the fact that people are beginning to say things like that."

King of the Mountain Men: The Life of Jim Bridger was published in 1961. Kirkus wrote that this retelling of the story of Jim Bridger: "is a worthy and highly readable one." The New York Times described the biography as "A stirring portrait of an important character is our history," while also noting that "[a]mong the most valuable parts of Mr. Caesar's are those in which he reminds us that the life of the Mountain Man could be dirty and dull as well as dangerous and daring." Roderick Frazier Nash cites King of the Mountain Men in support of his argument that Jim Bridger "was in the West to harvest the remaining beaver and profit from an expanding civilization" And William Eastlake, in The New Mexico Quarterly, urged: "Read King of the Mountain Men. It will tell you exactly the heroic way it all was before the tract houses came" (p. 186). King of the Mountain Men is cited as a prize-winning work for juveniles in A Western Legacy: The National Cowboy & Western Heritage Museum by The National Cowboy and Western Heritage Museum (2005). It is used for historical background by Win Blevins in his novel Give Your Heart to the Hawks: A Tribute to the Mountain Men. Frederick E. Von Burg credits King of the Mountain Men with inspiring his juvenile science fiction novel Keep My White Sneakers, Kit Carson: An Adventure with the Blackfeet, writing: "I picked that book up from a library table of worn out books, and I didn't put it down until I'd finished it."

Continuing his pursuit of "colorful and exciting [...] fast-paced chronicle[s]," Caesar composed Incredible Detective: The Biography of William J. Burns (1968). Kirkus wrote that this biography of William J. Burns "has been recorded with a sense of newspaper sensationalism but armchair detectives should snap it up." Despite the description of "sensationalism", the work has been widely cited. Howard Blum, in American Lightning: Terror, Mystery, and the Birth of Hollywood, recommends that "[t]hose wanting more of a feel for Burns's career should consult Gene Caesar's Incredible Detective." Incredible Detective is cited as a historical reference for the life of William Burns in The Development of the U.S. Security Industry by R. D. McCrie (1988), by Ardis Cameron in Looking for America: The Visual Production of Nation and People by Charles K. Hyde in The Business History Review (1986)., by William R. Hunt, in American's Sherlock Holmes and by Gregory Wood in the Journal of Social History (2011). It is cited as "a biography sanctioned by the Burns firm" in The Day Wall Street Exploded: A Story of America in Its First Age of Terror by Beverly Gage.

=== Pulp fiction ===
Under the pseudonym of Johnny Laredo, Caesar wrote potboilers like Come And Get Me, blurbed as "Love And Violence In A City Jungle", while as Anthony Sterling, he exposed the seamy (and steamy) underside of Ben Purnell, King of the Israelite House of David, and his "Virgin Love Cult" in Michigan's Benton Harbor (King of the Harem Heaven; Harem Island).

=== Cultural significance ===
Gene Caesar was listed in Who's Who in America in 1953, in Michigan Poets with Supplement to Michigan Authors 1960, in Who's Who in the Midwest (10th edition, 1967–8), in the Dictionary of International Biography in 1967–8, in Contemporary Authors from 1974 to 1998, in Michigan in Fiction in 1976, in Michigan Authors, 2nd ed. in 1980 and in Literary Michigan by the Michigan Council for the Humanities in 1988.

=== Further resources ===
Mark of the Hunter, King of Harem Heaven and Harem Island are listed in Michigan in the Novel, 1816–1996: An Annotated Bibliography by Robert Beasecker (1998). Incredible Detective is listed in Bookman's Guide to Americana, 9th edition.
