= Robert Teichmüller =

German pianist and music educator (1863–1939)

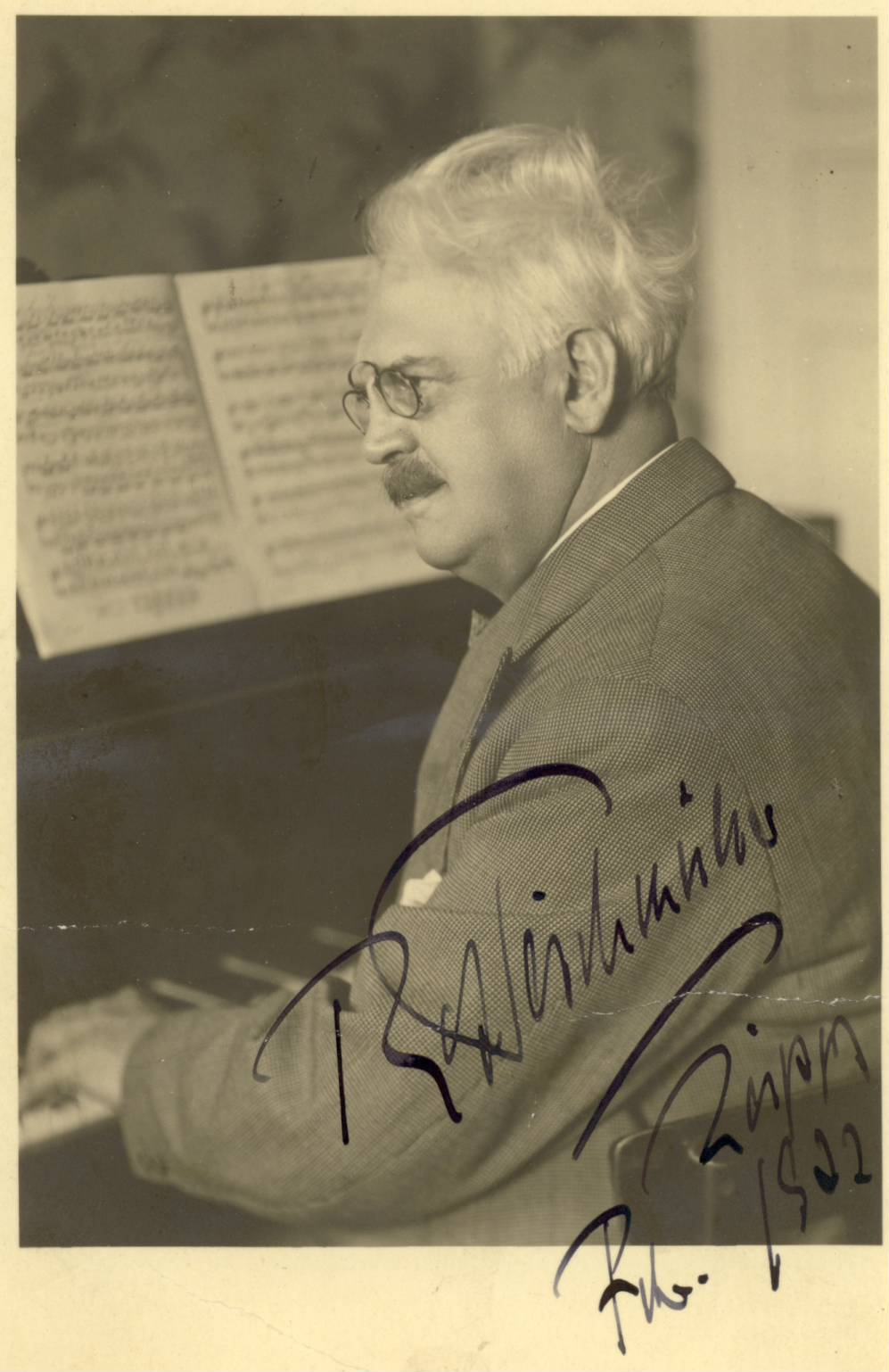
Robert Teichmüller.

Robert Teichmüller (4 May 1863, in Braunschweig – 6 May 1939, in Leipzig) was a German concert pianist and music educator.

He studied piano and music theory with Carl Reinecke at the Leipzig Conservatory where he later became a faculty member in 1897, promoted to professor in 1908. He became one of the most influential piano teachers of his time. His students included notable pianists Günther Ramin, Sigfrid Karg-Elert, Siegfried Rapp, Harry Dean, Kurt Hessenberg, Eileen Joyce, Rudolf Wagner-Régeny, Didia Saint Georges, Herbert Albert, Rudolf Mauersberger, Elinor Kaland (maiden name Loose), Leonard Shepherd Munn, Ninon Romaine, and Ernst Oster, who became a music theory teacher. He also edited piano music of Mozart and Max Reger. In 1927 he wrote an ongoing survey of "International Modern Piano Music" with Kurt Hermann.

== Literature ==
=== In German ===
- Baresel, Alfred: Robert Teichmüller und die Leipziger Klaviertradition. Peters, Leipzig 1934.
- Baresel, Alfred (ed.): Robert Teichmüller als Mensch und Künstler. Leipzig 1922.
- Jarck, Horst-Rüdiger & Scheel, Günter (eds.): Braunschweigisches Biographisches Lexikon. 19. und 20. Jahrhundert. Hannover 1996, S. 606

=== In English ===
- VanWart, Helen: Letters from Helen. Sybertooth. Sackville, New Brunswick 2010. ISBN 978-0-9810244-9-3 [Letters from a student of Teichmüller, from 1913 to 1914.]
