= Nanetti =

Nanetti is an Italian surname. Notable people with the surname include:

- Angela Nanetti, Italian writer active in 2019
- Maria Chiara Nanetti (1872–1900), Italian nun and saint

Translated literally, it means "little dwarves".

== See also ==
- Nanette
