= S. J. Dahlstrom =

American author

Nathan Dahlstrom (pen name: S. J. Dahlstrom) is an American book author and middle school teacher at Hutchinson Middle School in Lubbock Texas. He has received the National Cowboy & Western Heritage Museum's Western Heritage Award for Juvenile Books four times and the Western Writers of America's Spur Award for Juvenile Novel twice.

== Awards ==
Awards for Dahlstrom's writing
Title	Year	Award	Result	Ref.
Texas Grit	2015	Will Rogers Medallion Award for Western Fiction: Young Readers	Winner	
The Elk Hunt	2015-16	Lamplighter Award	Nominee	
The Green Colt	2017	Spur Award for Juvenile Novel	Finalist	
The Green Colt	2017	Western Heritage Award for Juvenile Books	Winner	
The Green Colt	2017	Will Rogers Medallion Award for Western Fiction: Young Readers	Winner	
The Green Colt	2018-19	Lamplighter Award	Nominee	
Wilder and Sunny	2017-2018	Lamplighter Award	Nominee	
Black Rock Brothers	2019	Will Rogers Medallion Award for Western Fiction: Young Readers	Second	
Silverbelly	2020	Will Rogers Medallion Award for Western Fiction: Young Readers	Winner	
Silverbelly	2021	Spur Award for Juvenile Novel	Winner	
Silverbelly	2021	Western Heritage Award for Juvenile Books	Winner	
Silverbelly	2022-23	Lamplighter Award	Nominee	
Cow Boyhood	2022	Spur Award for Juvenile Novel	Winner	
Cow Boyhood	2022	Western Heritage Award for Juvenile Books	Winner	
Cow Boyhood	2022	Will Rogers Medallion Award for Western Fiction - Young Readers	Silver	
Heartwood Mountain	2024	Western Heritage Award for Juvenile Books	Winner	
Heartwood Mountain	2024	Will Rogers Medallion Award for Western Young Reader/Fiction	Winner	

== The Adventures of Wilder Good series ==
1. The Elk Hunt: The Adventure Begins. Paul Dry Books. 2013. ISBN 978-1-589-88087-0.
2. Texas Grit. Paul Dry Books. 2014. ISBN 978-1-589-88094-8.
3. Wilder and Sunny. Paul Dry Books. 2015. ISBN 978-1-589-88100-6.
4. The Green Colt. Paul Dry Books. 2016. ISBN 978-1-589-88114-3.
5. Black Rock Brothers. Paul Dry Books. 2018. ISBN 978-1-589-88127-3.
6. Silverbelly. Paul Dry Books. 2020. ISBN 978-1-589-88143-3.
7. Cow Boyhood. Paul Dry Books. 2021. ISBN 978-1-589-88154-9.
8. Heartwood Mountain. Paul Dry Books. 2023. ISBN 978-1-589-88183-9.
9. Never Curse the Rain. Paul Dry Books. 2025. ISBN 978-1-589-88203-2.
