= Anuk =

Anuk is a given name. Notable people with the name include:

- Anuk Arudpragasam (born 1988), Sri Lankan novelist
- Anuk de Alwis (born 1991), Sri Lankan cricketer
- Anuk Fernando (born 1995), Sri Lankan cricketer
- Anuk Lawik, son of the last ruler of Zabul

== See also ==
- Anouk
