= Aneke =

- Gender: Male
- Language: Igbo

Origin
- Origin: Nigerian
- Meaning: Many, plurality, abundance
- Region of origin: Igboland

Aneke audiois an Igbo name. It means "Many, plurality, abundance".

== Notable individuals with the name ==
- Chidinma and Chidiebere Aneke (born 1986), Nigerian Nollywood stars.
- Jude Aneke (born 1990), Nigerian footballer.
- James N.J. Aneke, Nigerian Navy officer and Military Governor.
- Chuks Aneke (born 1993), Nigerian English professional footballer.
- Chjioke Aneke, Nigerian Anglican bishop.
- Miracle Aneke, Ghanaian-Nigerian blogger.

== See also ==
- Nwagu Aneke script
