= Mary Clearman Blew =

American non fiction writer

Mary Clearman Blew (born 1939) is an American non fiction writer.

== Life ==
She was born in 1939, December 10th.

She was born and raised in Montana near Lewistown.

She attended the University of Montana.

== Career ==
She is a professor of creative writing at the University of Idaho and Pacific Lutheran University.

She has received the Pacific Northwest Booksellers Award and the Western Heritage Award.

== Bibliography ==
Some of her books are:

- All But the Waltz: A Memoir of Five Generations in the Life of a Montana Family (Viking, 1991)
- This Is Not the Ivy League: A Memoir
- Balsamroot: A Memoir
- Jackalope Dreams
- Bone Deep in Landscape: Writing, Reading, and Place
