= Western Heritage Awards =

American arts and entertainment award

Wrangler Award
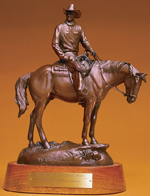
- "The Wrangler" in bronze
- Country: United States
- Presented by: National Cowboy & Western Heritage Museum
- First award: 1961
- Website: Official website

The Western Heritage Award, also known as The Bronze Wrangler, is an award presented annually by the National Cowboy & Western Heritage Museum to honor the top works in music, film, television, and literature that put forward a vision of the American West.

The Western Heritage Awards were first presented in 1961. Many works are in the Western genre. The Wrangler is a bronze sculpture of a cattle wrangler on horseback, and is designed by artist John Free.

The awards program also recognizes inductees into the prestigious Hall of Great Westerners and the Hall of Great Western Performers as well as the recipient of the Chester A. Reynolds Memorial Award, named in honor of the Museum's founder.

== Award categories ==
=== Film and television ===
==== Theatrical Motion Picture ====
Year	Film	Creators(s)	Publisher(s)	Ref.
1961	The Alamo	John Wayne (director), James Edward Grant (screenplay)	Batjac/United Artists	
1962	The Comancheros	Michael Curtiz (director), James Edward Grant (screenplay), Clair Huffaker (screenplay), Paul I. Wellman (original novel)	20th Century Fox	
1963	The Man Who Shot Liberty Valance	John Ford (director), James Warner Bellah (screenplay), Dorothy M. Johnson (original short story)	Paramount Pictures	
1964	How the West Was Won	John Ford (director), James R. Webb (screenplay)	Cinerama/Metro-Goldwyn-Mayer	
1965	Cheyenne Autumn	John Ford (director), James R. Webb (screenplay), Mari Sandoz (original story)	Warner Bros.	
1966	The Sons of Katie Elder	Henry Hathaway (director), William H. Wright (screenplay), Allan Weiss (screenplay), Harry Essex (screenplay), Talbot Jennings (original story)	Hal B. Wallis/Paramount Pictures	
1967	The Appaloosa	Sidney J. Furie (director), James Bridges (screenplay), Roland Kibbee (screenplay), Robert MacLeod (original novel)	Universal Pictures	
1968	The War Wagon	Burt Kennedy (director, screenplay), Clair Huffaker (screenplay, original novel)	Universal Pictures	
1969	Will Penny	Tom Gries (director, screenplay)	Paramount Pictures	
1970	True Grit	Henry Hathaway (director), Marguerite Roberts (screenplay), Charles Portis (original novel)	Hal B. Wallis/Paramount Pictures	
1971	A Man Called Horse	Elliot Silverstein (director), Jack DeWitt (screenplay), Dorothy M. Johnson (original short story)	Cinema Center Films/National General Pictures	
1972	The Cowboys	Mark Rydell (director), Irving Ravetch (screenplay), Harriet Frank Jr. (screenplay), William Dale Jennings (original novel)	Warner Bros.	
1973	Jeremiah Johnson	Sydney Pollack (director), John Milius (screenplay), Edward Anhalt (screenplay), Raymond W. Thorp (story), Robert Bunker (story)	Warner Bros.	
1974	The New Land	Jan Troell (director, screenplay), Bengt Forslund (screenplay), Vilhelm Moberg (original novel)	Svensk Filmindustri	
1975	No award given			
1976	Bite the Bullet	John C. Champion (director), Richard Brooks (director, screenplay)	Columbia Pictures	
1977–1980	No awards given			
1981	Heartland	Richard Pearce (director), Beth Ferris (screenplay), William Kittredge (screenplay), Elinore Randall Stewart (original story)	Levitt-Pickman	
1983	No award given			
1984	Never Cry Wolf	Carroll Ballard (director), Curtis Hanson (screenplay), Sam Hamm (screenplay), Richard Kletter (screenplay), Farley Mowat (original story)	Walt Disney Pictures	
1985–1988	No awards given			
1989	Young Guns	Christopher Cain (director), John Fusco (screenplay)	Morgan Creek Productions	
1990	No award given			
1991	Dances with Wolves	Kevin Costner (director), Michael Blake (screenplay, original novel)	Orion Pictures	
1992	Thousand Pieces of Gold	Nancy Kelly (director), Anne Makepeace (screenplay), Ruthanne Lum McCunn (original novel)	Mother Lode Productions	
1993	Unforgiven	Clint Eastwood (director), David Peoples (screenplay)	Malpaso Productions/Warner Bros.	
1994	Geronimo: An American Legend	Walter Hill (director), John Milius (screenplay), Larry Gross (screenplay)	Columbia Pictures	
1995	Legends of the Fall	Edward Zwick (director), Bill Wittliff (screenplay), Jim Harrison (original novella)	TriStar Pictures	
1996–1998	No awards given			
1999	The Hi-Lo Country	Stephen Frears (director), Walon Green (screenwriter), Max Evans (original novel)	Gramercy Pictures	
2000–2002	No awards given			
2003	Spirit: Stallion of the Cimarron	Kelly Asbury (director), Lorna Cook (director), John Fusco (screenplay)	DreamWorks Pictures	
2004	Open Range	Kevin Costner (director), Craig Storper (screenplay), Lauran Paine (original novel)	Tig Productions	
2005	No award given			
2006	The Three Burials of Melquiades Estrada	Tommy Lee Jones (director), Guillermo Arriaga (screenplay)	EuropaCorp/Javelina Film Company	
2007	Truce	Matthew Marconi (director, screenplay)	Anthem Pictures	
2008	3:10 to Yuma	James Mangold (director), Halsted Welles (screenplay), Michael Brandt (screenplay), Derek Haas (screenplay), Elmore Leonard (original short story)	Lionsgate	
2009	Appaloosa	Ed Harris (director, screenplay), Robert Knott (screenplay), Robert B. Parker (original novel)	Warner Bros. Pictures	
2010	No award given			
2011	True Grit	Joel and Ethan Coen (directors, screenplay), Scott Rudin (producer), Charles Portis (original novel)	Paramount Pictures	
2012	Yellow Rock	Nick Vallelonga (director), Lenore Andriel (screenplay), Steve Doucette (screenplay)	Enlightenment Films Inc./Vallelonga Productions	
2013	Django Unchained	Quentin Tarantino (director, screenplay)	The Weinstein Company	
2014	The Cherokee Word for Water	Charlie Soap (director), Tim Kelly (director, screenplay), Louise Rubacky (screenplay), Gary Miranda (screenplay)	Kamama Films	
2015	The Homesman	Tommy Lee Jones (director, screenplay), Kieran Fitzgerald (screenplay), Wesley Oliver (screenplay), Glendon Swarthout (original novel)	Javelina Film Company/Ithaca Films	
2016	No award given			
2017	Hell or High Water	David Mackenzie (director), Taylor Sheridan (screenplay)	Film 44/OddLot Entertainment/Sidney Kimmel Entertainment	
2018	Wind River	Taylor Sheridan (director, screenplay)	The Weinstein Company	
2019	The Ballad of Buster Scruggs	Joel and Ethan Coen (directors, screenplay)	Netflix	
2020	Deadwood: The Movie	Daniel Minahan (director), David Milch (screenplay)	HBO	
2021	News of the World	Paul Greengrass (director, screenplay), Paulette Jiles (original novel)	Universal Pictures	
2022	The Power of the Dog	Jane Campion (director, screenplay), Thomas Savage (original novel)	Netflix	
2023	Dead for a Dollar	Walter Hill (director, screenplay)	Myriad Pictures	
2024	Ride	Jake Allyn (director, screenplay), Josh Plasse (screenplay)	Well Go	
2025	Tokyo Cowboy	Marc Marriott (director), Ayako Fujitani (screenplay), Dave Boyle (screenplay)	Purdie Distribution	
2026	Broke	Carlyle Eubank (director, screenplay)	Sony Pictures	

==== Outstanding Docudrama ====
Year	Film	Creators(s)	Publisher(s)	Ref.
2013	Hatfields & McCoys	Kevin Reynolds (director), Bill Kerby (screenplay), Ted Mann (screenplay), Leslie Greif (executive producer), Nancy Dubuc (executive producer), Dirk Hoogstra (executive producer)	History	
2014	Gold Fever	Stephen David (producer)	Discovery Channel	
2015	The Road to Valhalla	Ken Spurgeon (director, writer)	Lone Chimney Films	
2018	Home on the Range	Ken Spurgeon (director)	Lone Chimney Films	
2026	Elkhorn: A Fine Welcome	Michael Ojeda (director), Paninee Theeranuntawat (executive producer), Gary Tarpinian (executive producer)	Morningstar Entertainment	

==== Television Feature Film ====
Year	Film	Creators(s)	Publisher(s)	Ref.
1990	Lonesome Dove	Simon Wincer (director), William D. Wittliff (screenplay), Larry McMurtry (original novel)	CBS	
1991	Across Five Aprils	Kevin Meyer (director, screenplay), Irene Hunt (original novel)	The Family Channel	
1992	Conagher	Reynaldo Villalobos (director), Sam Elliott (screenplay), Katharine Ross (screenplay), Jeffrey M. Meyer (screenplay) Louis L'Amour (original novel)	TNT	
1993	O Pioneers!	Glenn Jordan (director), Robert W. Lenski (screenplay), Willa Cather (original novel)	CBS	
1994	Return to Lonesome Dove	Mike Robe (director), John Wilder (screenplay)	CBS	
1995	Lakota Woman: Siege at Wounded Knee	Frank Pierson (director), Bill Kerby (screenplay), Mary Crow Dog (original story)	TNT	
1996	Streets of Laredo	Joseph Sargent (director), Diana Ossana (screenplay), Larry McMurtry (screenplay, original novel)	CBS	
1997	Riders of the Purple Sage	Charles Haid (director), Gill Dennis (screenplay), Zane Grey (original novel)	TNT	
1998	Last Stand at Saber River	Dick Lowry (director), Ronald M. Cohen (screenplay), Elmore Leonard (original novel)	TNT	
1999	Two for Texas	Rod Hardy (director), Larry Brothers (screenplay)	TNT	
2000	Purgatory	Uli Edel (director), Gordon T. Dawson (screenplay)	TNT	
2000	You Know My Name	John Kent Harrison (director, screenplay)	TNT	
2001	The Virginian	Bill Pullman (director), Larry Gross (screenwriter), Owen Wister (original novel)	TNT	
2002	Crossfire Trail	Simon Wincer (director), Charles Robert Carner (screenplay), Louis L'Amour (original novel)	TNT	
2003	King of Texas	Uli Edel (director), Stephen Harrigan (screenplay)	TNT	
2004	Monte Walsh	Simon Wincer (director), Michael Brandman (screenplay), Robert B. Parker (screenplay), David Z. Goodman (screenplay), Lukas Heller (screenplay), Jack Schaefer (original novel)	TNT	
2005	The Trail to Hope Rose	David S. Cass Sr. (director), Kevin Cutts (screenplay)	Larry Levinson Productions/Hallmark Channel	
2006	Into the West	(multiple directors and writers)	DreamWorks Television/TNT	
2007	Broken Trail	Walter Hill (director), Alan Geoffrion (screenplay)	AMC	
2008	Bury My Heart at Wounded Knee	Yves Simoneau (director), Daniel Giat (screenplay)	Wolf Films/Traveler's Rest Films/HBO Films	
2011	Temple Grandin	Mick Jackson (director), Christopher Monger (screenplay), William Merritt Johnson (screenplay)	A Ruby Films/Gerson Saines Production/HBO Films	
2012	Love's Christmas Journey	David S. Cass Sr. (director), George Tierney (screenplay), Janette Oke (original novel)	Larry Levinson Productions/Hallmark Channel	
2013	Shadow on the Mesa	David S. Cass Sr. (director), Lee Martin (screenplay)	Larry Levinson Productions/Hallmark Channel	
2014	No award given			
2015	Klondike	Simon Cellan Jones (director), Paul Scheuring (screenplay), Josh Goldin (screenplay), Rachel Abramowitz (screenplay)	Scott Free Productions/Discovery Channel	
2016	Texas Rising	Roland Joffé (director), Leslie Greif (screenplay), Darrell Fetty (screenplay), George Nihil (screenplay)	A&E Studios/ITV Studios America/ThinkFactory Media	

==== Factual Narrative ====
Year	Film	Creators(s)	Publisher(s)	Ref.
1990	Billings Bound	Bob Kane (director, producer)	CGI Films	
1991	ABC World of Discovery: "Cougar: Ghost of the Rockies"	Dennis B. Kane (executive producer), Jim Dutcher (producer), David R. O'Dell (writer), Richard Kiley (narrator)	ABC	
1992	Primetime Live: "Chances With Wolves"	Richard Kaplan (producer), Bob Calo (producer), Jay Schadler (correspondent)	ABC	
1993	Legends of the West	Jack Palance (host, producer), Igo Kantor (producer), Tom Daniels (producer), Dennis Casey Park (producer), John "Bud" Cardos (director), Roger Galloway (writer)	819 Productions	
1994	Beyond Eden's Gate	Steve King (producer), Trish Neiworth (producer) Larry Bollinger (director), Jeff Gustin (photographer) Jack McGowan (narrator)	KPTV/Oregon Public Television	
1995	Day One: "Poachers' Paradise"	Tom Yellin (producer), Kevin Cosgrove (producer), John McKenzie (writer), Kevin Cosgrove (writer), John McKenzie (reporter)	ABC	
1996	No award given			
1997	Austin City Limits: "Sagebrush Symphony"	Jim Norman (producer), Terry Lickona (producer), Tim Weeks (producer), Kevin Kipp (producer), Gary Menotti (director), Michael Martin Murphey (narrator)	KLRU-TV/PBS	
1998	The Oklahoma Traveler In No Man's Land	Scott Thompson (producer, writer), Grant Gerondale (photographer)	KOTV	
1999	The New Explorers: "Betrayal At Little Big Horn"	Bill Kurtis (producer), Gary Foreman (producer, writer)		
2000	Biography: "Annie Oakley: Crackshot in Petticoats"	Craig Haffner (producer), Donna E. Lusitana (producer), Arthur Drooker (director, producer, writer)	A&E	
2001	No award given			
2002	There's No Place Like California	Donald E. Collins (producer), Dr. Peter G. Mehas (producer), Dan Pessano (director) Jack Hannah (narrator, writer)	Fresno County Office of Education	
2003	Spirit of Colorado: "Cowboys"	John W. Burshtan (producer), Lisa D. Olken (producer), Kim Kendrick (producer), Lisa D. Olken (director)	KRMA-TV/Rocky Mountain PBS	
2004	ABC News Nightline: "The Cowboy Way"	Leroy Sievers (executive producer), Tom Bettag (executive producer), Sara Just (senior producer), Ted Koppel (managing editor), Chris Bury (anchor)	ABC	
2005	EKN Teen Kids News: "Cowgirl Museum"	Al Primo (creator), Alan J. Weiss (creator)	Alan Weiss Productions	
2006	American Masters: "Willa Cather: The Road Is All"	Christine Lesiak (producer, writer), Joel Geyer (director, producer)	NET/PBS	
2007	Gallery: "Young At Art"	Bill Perry (producer), Bill Thrash (producer), Randy Hayes (photographer)	OETA	
2008	100 Years of John Wayne	Jeff Hildebrandt (producer), Elizabeth Daly (producer)	Starz Encore Westerns	

==== Factual Television Program ====
(awarded from 1961 until 1989)

Year	Film	Creators(s)	Publisher(s)	Ref.
1961	Death Valley Days: "The Great Lounsberry Scoop"	Ruth Woodman (producer), Nat Perrin (writer)		
1962	Project Twenty: "The Real West"	Donald B. Hyatt (producer), Philip H. Reisman Jr. (screenplay), Gary Cooper (narrator)	NBC	
1963	Death Valley Days: "The Hat that Wore the West"	Sidney Salkow (director), Robert Stabler (producer), Irwin Winehouse (writer), A. Sanford Wolf (writer), Frank Buxton (actor)		
1964	Discovery '63: "The American Cowboy"	Jules Power (producer), Lou Volpicelli (director), Sol Stember (writer), Frank Buxton (actor)	ABC	
1965	The Hanging Judge	Gene Allen (producer), Jerry Powell (writer), Virgil Dominic (narrator)	WKY-TV	
1965	Hollywood and the Stars: "They Went That-a-Way"	Jack Haley Jr. (director), Terry Sanders (producer)	NBC	
1966	Custer to the Little Bighorn	William Hartigan (photographer), John and Helen Jean Rogers (directors), John H. Secondari (producer)	ABC	
1966	The Journals of Lewis and Clark	Dexter Alley (photographer), Richard Norling (photographer), Calvin P. Tompkins (writer), Ted Yates (producer), Lorne Greene (narrator)	NBC	
1967	Discovery: "An Iron Horse in Silver Pastures"	Joseph Hurley (writer), Daniel Wilson (producer), Virginia Gibson (actor), Bill Owen (actor)	ABC	
1968	Project Twenty: "The End of the Trail"	Robert Garthwaite (producer)	NBC	
1969	The Bonanza Years	Aldo H. Constant (general manager)	KRON-TV	
1970	Project Twenty: "The West of Charles Russell"	Robert Garthwaite (producer), Donald B. Hyatt (producer), Richard Hansen (director), Frederic G. Renner (consultant)	NBC	
1971	The Last of the Westerners	James Benjamin (producer), David Tapper (director), Robert Ryan (narrator)	ABC	
1972	No awards given			
1973	America: "Gone West"	Alistair Cooke (writer), Michael Gill (producer), Tim Slessor (director)	NBC	
1974	Conrad Schwiering, Mountain Painter	Duane Barr (director), Jack Rosenthal (producer)	KTWO-TV	
1975	The American Parade: "The 34th Star"	Joel Heller (producer), Robert Markowitz (director), Richard Kiley (actor), Ronnie Claire Edwards (actor)	CBS	
1976	I Will Fight No More Forever	Richard T. Heffron (director), Stan Margulies (producer), David L. Wolper (producer), James Whitmore (actor), Ned Romero (actor), Sam Elliott (actor)	ABC	
1977	No award given			
1978	The American Idea: The Glory Road West	Terry Sanders (producer), Henry Fonda (narrator), Chad Everett (narrator), Buffy Sainte-Marie (narrator)	ABC	
1979	Ishi: The Last of His Tribe	Robert Ellis Miller (director), Edward and Mildred Lewis (producers), Christopher Trumbo (screenplay), Dalton Trumbo (screenplay), Eloy Casados (actor)	NBC	
1980	John Denver's Rocky Mountain Reunion	Mark Stouffer (producer), John Denver (actor)	ABC	
1981	The Lone Star Cowboy	David K. Boles (producer), Kenneth D. Cockroft (photographer)	KPRC-TV	
1982	Hidden Places	Philip Abbott (host), Gene Bunge, (director), Steve Robbins (producer)	NET	
1983	Light in the West: Photographers of the American Frontier, 1860-1880	Michael Blackwood (producer), Ray Witlin (director)		
1984	Cowboy	John Bass (producer), Steve Torbeck (producer)		
1985	Good Morning America: "Custer's Battlefield"	Fred Farrar (producer)	ABC	
1986	The New Capitalists: Economics in Indian Country	Stephen R. Heiser (director), Char B. Rowlinson (executive director), Eric Sevareid (narrator)		
1987	Houston: The Legend of Texas	Frank Q. Dobbs (producer, writer), John Binder (writer), Peter Levin (director)	CBS	
1988	20/20: "On the Range"	Rob Wallace (producer), Bob Brown (writer)	ABC	
1989	POV: "Cowboy Poets"	Kim Shelton (producer)	PBS	

==== Fictional Television Drama ====
Year	Film	Creators(s)	Publisher(s)	Ref.
1961	Rawhide: "Incident at Dragoon Crossing"	Ted Post (director), John Dunkel (screenplay)	CBS	
1962	Rawhide: "The Sendoff"	George Templeton (director), John Dunkel (screenplay)	CBS	
1963	Stoney Burke: "The Contender"	Leslie Stevens (director, screenplay)	ABC	
1964	Rawhide: "Incident of Iron Bull"	Christian Nyby (director), Carey Wilber (screenplay)	CBS	
1965	Rawhide: "Corporal Dasovic"	Bernard L. Kowalski (director), Lionel E. Siegel (screenplay)	CBS	
1966	The Virginian: "The Horse Fighter"	Anton Leader (director), Richard Fielder (screenplay)	NBC	
1967	The Monroes: "The Intruders"	Bernard L. Kowalski (director), Otis Carney (screenplay)	ABC	
1967	Gunsmoke: "Death Watch"	Mark Rydell (director), Calvin Clements Sr. (screenplay)	CBS	
1968	The Virginian: "Bitter Autumn"	Don McDougall (director), Andy and David Lewis (screenplay)	NBC	
1969	The High Chaparral: "The Buffalo Soldiers"	David Dortort (director), Walter Black (screenplay)	NBC	
1970	Bonanza: "The Wish"	David Dortort (director), Michael Landon (director, screenplay)	NBC	
1971	Run, Simon, Run	George McCowan (director), Lionel E. Siegel (screenplay), Aaron Spelling (producer)	ABC	
1972	Gunsmoke: "Pike"	Bernard McEveety (director), Jack Miller (screenplay)	CBS	
1973	Hec Ramsey: "The Century Turns"	Daniel Petrie (director), Harold Jack Bloom (screenplay)	NBC	
1974	Pioneer Woman	Buzz Kulik (director), Suzanne Clauser (screenplay)	ABC	
1975	Little House on the Prairie	Ed Friendly (producer), Michael Landon (actor), Melissa Sue Anderson (actor), Melissa Gilbert (actor), Karen Grassle (actor)	NBC	
1976	The Macahans	Jim Byrnes (creator, screenplay)	ABC	
1977	No award given			
1978	Peter Lundy and the Medicine Hat Stallion	Michael O'Herlihy (director), Jack Turley (screenplay)	NBC	
1979	Centennial: "The Longhorns"	Virgil W. Vogel (director), John Wilder (screenplay)	NBC	
1980	The Last Ride of the Dalton Gang	Dan Curtis (director), Earl W. Wallace (screenplay)	NBC	
1981–1982	No awards given			
1983	The Legend of Walks Far Woman	Mel Damski (director), Evan Hunter (screenplay)	NBC	
1984	September Gun	Don Taylor (director), William Norton (screenplay)	CBS	
1985	Calamity Jane	James Goldstone (director), Suzanne Clauser (screenplay)	CBS	
1986	The Dream	Joseph Pytka (director), Ben Johnson (narrator)		
1987	Stagecoach	Ted Post (director), James Lee Barrett (screenplay)	CBS	
1988	Independence	John Patterson (director), Gordon T. Dawson (screenplay)	NBC	
1989	Paradise: "Stray Bullet"	Michael Caffey (director), David Jacobs (creator), Robert Porter (creator)	CBS	
1990	The Young Riders: "The Kid"	Jonas McCord (director), Ed Spielman (screenplay)	ABC	
1991	The Young Riders: "Requiem for a Hero"	Virgil W. Vogel (director), Bruce Reisman (screenplay)	ABC	
1992	The Young Riders: "The Peacemakers"	James Keach (director), Charles Grant Craig (screenplay)	ABC	
1993	The Young Riders: "Shadowmen"	James Brolin (director), Charles Grant Craig (screenplay)	ABC	
1994	Ned Blessing: The Story of My Life and Times: "Oscar"	David Hemmings (director), Stephen Harrigan (writer), William D. Wittliff (screenplay)	CBS	
1995–1996	No awards given			
1997	Dr. Quinn, Medicine Woman: "Legend"	Alan J. Levi (director), Beth Sullivan (screenplay), Carl Binder (screenplay)	CBS	
1998	Dead Man's Gun: "Buryin' Sam"	William Gereghty (director), Ed Spielman (screenplay)	Showtime	
1999	Dead Man's Gun: "The Judgment of Joe Dean Bonner"	René Bonnière (director), Howard Friedlander (screenplay)	Showtime	
2000	Dead Man's Gun: "The Regulator"	Paul Etherington (director), Rogers Turrentine (screenplay)	Showtime	
2001–2003	No awards given			
2004	Peacemakers: "29 Seconds"	Jean de Segonzac (director), Rob Wright (screenplay)	USA Network	
2005–2010	No awards given			
2011	Yella Fella & The Lady from Silver Gulch	Norton Dill (director), Slats Slaton (screenplay)		
2012	No award given			
2013	Longmire	John Coveny, (creator, screenplay), Hunt Baldwin (creator, screenplay)	A&E	
2014	Hell on Wheels: "One Less Mule"	David Straiton (director), Deran Sarafian (director), John Wirth (screenplay), Lolis Eric Elie (screenplay)	AMC	
2015	Hell on Wheels: "Return to Hell"	Billy Gierhart (director), Jami O'Brien (screenplay)	AMC	
2016	Hell on Wheels: "Hungry Ghosts"	Neil LaBute (director), Jami O'Brien (screenplay), Miki Johnson (screenplay)	AMC	
2017	Longmire: "Chrysalis"	Adam Bluming (director), Tony Tost (screenplay)	Netflix	
2018	Godless: "Homecoming"	Scott Frank (director, screenplay)	Netflix	
2019	Yellowstone	Taylor Sheridan (creator, screenplay)	Paramount Network	

==== Western Documentary ====
Year	Film	Creators(s)	Publisher(s)	Ref.
1961	Four Seasons West	Max Howe (director, producer)	Max Howe Film Productions	
1962	101	Scott Berner (director), Gary Allen (producer)	WKY-TV	
1963	Appaloosa	Brown Meggs (director, writer)	Fred Rice Productions	
1964	Pioneer Painter	Cliff Atkins (director), Gene Allen (producer)	WKY-TV	
1965	Age of the Buffalo	Nicholas Balla (director), Austin Campbell (director), M. Charles Cohen (author)	National Film Board of Canada	
1966	The Beautiful Tree - Chishkale - Tan Oak	Clyde B. Smith (director), William R. Heick (photographer)	University of California	
1967	The Five Civilized Tribes: An Unfinished Journey	Jack Morris (director), Harold Statum (photographer), Bob Gregory (author)	KTUL-TV	
1968	Colorado: Prehistoric Man	Kenneth A Meyer (director)	Barbre Productions Inc./State Historical Society for Colorado	
1968	Time of the West	Charles Guggenheim (director)	Guggenheim Productions/Jefferson National Expansion Memorial	
1969	Born to Buck	Casey Tibbs (producer), Richard McCarty (photographer)	Casey Tibbs Productions	
1970	The Golden Spike	Kenneth A. Meyer (director), Royal Dano (narrator)	Barbre Productions Inc./National Park Service	
1971	Rodeo	Carroll Ballard (director), Gaby Monet (producer)	Concepts Unlimited Inc./Contemporary Films-McGraw Hill	
1972	The Last of the Wild Mustangs	Norman Muse (producer), Gus Jekel (director), Orson Welles (narrator)	Leo Burnett Co./Marlboro Cigarettes	
1973	Bighorn!	Marty Stouffer (producer)		
1974	The Great American Cowboy	Kieth Merrill (director, producer)		
1975	Goin' Down the Road	Kieth Merrill (director, producer)	R.J. Reynolds Tobacco Co.	
1976	Red Sunday: The Battle of the Little Bighorn	Jack Graff (producer), James R. Graff (producer), Robert A. Henkel (producer), James B. Kelly (director), John McIntire (narrator), Mary Actor (author)	Pyramid Films	
1977	No award given			
1978	More Than Bows & Arrows	Roy Williams (producer), Conrad W. Denke (director), N. Scott Momaday (narrator), Ron Forsell (author)	Cinema Associates Inc.	
1979	Lucy Covington: Native American Indian	Steve Heiser (director)	Encyclopedia Britannica Educational Corporation/Odyssey Productions	
1980	Art in Taos: The Early Years	Dana E. Balibrera (director, producer, writer)	Danamar Film Productions	
1981	No award given			
1982	Oklahoma Gems	Steve Newmann, Lee Allen Smith	KTVY-TV	
1983	Edward Fraughton, of Heroes and Horses	Kenneth and Claudia Meyer (producers), William G. Kerr	Ken Meyer Productions	
1984	Buffalo Cokedale	Jim Redmond (producer)	Colorado Cowboy Life	
1985	1915: Panama Pacific Fair	Burton Benedict (producer, narrator), Monica Fletcher (director)	University of California at Berkeley	
1986	Cowgirls: Portraits of American Ranch Women	Nancy Kelly (director, producer), Teresa Jordan (writer)	PBS	
1987	The Indomitable Teddy Roosevelt	Harrison Engle (producer), Marilyn S. Engle (producer), Theodore Strauss (writer), George C. Scott (narrator)	ABC	
1988	A $10 Horse and a $40 Saddle	Bryan Dew (director, producer), John Crowley (writer), Levon Helm (narrator)	American Frontier Project/Direct Cinema Limited	
1989	Indians, Outlaws and Angie Debo	Martha Sandlin (producer), Barbara Abrash (producer)	Oklahoma State University	
1990	Oklahoma Passage	Kenneth A. Meyer (director), Bill Thrash (producer), Robert L. Allen (producer)	OETA	
1991	Custer's Last Trooper	Bill Armstrong (producer)	A&E	
1992	The Platte River Road	Michael Farrell (director, producer, writer)	NETV	
1993	American Experience: "The Donner Party"	Ric Burns (director, producer, writer), Judy Crichton (producer), Lisa Ades (producer)	Steeplechase Films/WGBH	
1994	The Real West	Craig Haffner (executive producer), Donna E. Lusitana (executive producer), Steven Lewis (executive producer), Kenny Rogers (narrator)	Greystone Communications/A&E	
1995	Ishi: The Last Yahi	Jed Riffe (producer), Pamela Roberts (producer), Stephen Lighthill (photographer), Anne Makepeace (writer)	Ishi Film Project	
1996	How The West Was Lost	Chris Wheeler (producer), Sonny Hutchison (director), Michael Winship (writer)	KUSA-TV/Discovery Channel	
1997	Bloomers To Ballots	Lisa D. Olken (producer, photographer), Sherry Niermann (series producer)	KRMA-TV	
1998	Lewis & Clark: The Journey of the Corps of Discovery	Ken Burns (director, producer), Dayton Duncan (producer, writer)	WETA-TV/PBS	
1999	The New Explorers - Betrayal At Little Big Horn	Bill Kurtis (producer), Gary Foreman (producer, writer)	Kurtis Productions	
2000	TimeWatch: "Tales of the Oklahoma Land Runs"	Jonathan Gili (producer, writer), Laurence Rees (producer)	BBC Two	
2001	Time Machine: "The Real Cowboy: Portrait of An American Icon"	Bill Kurtis (producer), Nicole Ewing (producer, writer), Gary L. Foreman (producer, writer)	The History Channel	
2002	Seth Eastman: Painting the Dakota	Fred de Sam Lazaro (producer), Kristian Berg (director, producer, writer), Peter Coyote (narrator)	Afton Historical Society Press/Twin Cities Public Television	
2003	Daniel Boone and The Westward Movement	Gary Foreman (producer), Carolyn Raine (producer), Paul Hutton (writer), Scott New (narrator)	Native Sun Productions	
2004	Images of Indians: How Hollywood Stereotyped the Native American	Jason Witmer (director), Chris O'Brien (director), Brock DeShane (producer, writer)	Starz Encore Westerns	
2005	Sam Peckinpah's West: Legacy of a Hollywood Renegade	Tom Thurman (director), Tom Marksbury (writer)	FBN Productions/Starz Encore	
2006	Independent Lens: "The Last Cowboy"	Jon Alpert (director, producer)	DCTV/PBS	
2007	Ride Around the World	Jeff Fraley (producer), Brady Dial (producer), Harry Lynch (director, producer, writer)	Trinity Films Corp./Giant Screen Films/Janson Media	
2008	Cowboys in Tall Grass	Ken Greenwood (producer)	Cox Communications	
2009	The Challenge of Champions: The Story of Lane Frost & Red Rock	David Wittkower (producer), Clyde and Elsie Frost (narrators), John Growney (narrator)	Lighthouse Productions	
2010	Cowboys & Outlaws: "The Real Wyatt Earp"	Pip Gilmour (director, writer), Sean Gallagher (producer), Abby Greensfelder (producer), Paul Cabana (producer)	The History Channel	
2010	Born to Ride: Cody Wright and the Quest for a World Title	Jon Smith (producer), Lyman Hafen (director, writer), Wilford Brimley (narrator)	SUTV/Southern Utah University	
2010	My Friend Flicka	Letitia C. Langord (director), Ruby Calvert (producer), Kyle Nicholoff (producer)	Wyoming PBS	
2011	American Experience: "Wyatt Earp"	Mark Samels (producer), Rob Rapley (producer)	PBS	
2012	Main Street, Wyoming	Ruby Calvert (producer), Tom Manning (producer, writer), Kyle Nicholoff (director)	PBS	
2013	The Dust Bowl	Ken Burns (director), Dayton Duncan (writer)	PBS	
2014	Behind the Gate	Jack Lucarelli (director), Mark Giardino (director, writer)	GGG Productions	
2015	Stateline: "Cowboys of Color"	Bill Perry (producer), Robert Burch (producer), Dave Tamez (producer)	OETA	
2016	Unbranded	Phillip Baribeau (director)	Fin & Fur Films/Implement Productions	
2017	What Was Ours	Mat Hames (director)	Alpheus Media Inc.	
2018	Floating Horses: The Life of Casey Tibbs	Justin Koehler (director)	Nowlin Town Productions/Static Age Productions	
2019	UmoNhoN Iye The Omaha Speaking	Brigitte Timmerman (writer, director)	Range Films, LLC	
2020	Country Music	Ken Burns (director), Julie Dunfey (producer), Dayton Duncan	Florentine Films WETA	
2021	Charlie Russell’s Old West	Gus Chambers (director), Paul Saliz writer	Montana PBS	
2022	Home from School: The Children of Carlisle	Geoff O'Gara (director)	Caldera Productions	
2023	The Long Rider	Filipe Masetti Leite (director, producer)	Mythic Productions	
2024	Lakota Nation vs. United States	Jesse Short Bull (director), Laura Tomaselli (director)	Cinetic Media	
2025	Playing Cowboy	Bob Terry (director, writer), Johnie Terry (director)	Westerns on the Web	

=== Literary ===
==== Art Books ====
Year	Author(s)	Novel	Publisher or publication	Ref.
1968	E. Maurice Bloch	George Caleb Bingham: The Evolution of an Artist	University of California Press	
1969	Edward Maddin Ainsworth	The Cowboy in Art	World Publishing Co.	
1970	William Reed	Olaf Wieghorst	Northland Press	
1971	Robert F. Karolevitz	Where Your Heart Is: The Story of Harvey Dunn	North Plains Press	
1972	Paul A. Rossi and David C. Hunt	The Art of the Old West	Alfred A. Knopf, Inc.	
1973	Walt Reed	Harold Von Schmidt Draws and Paints the Old West	Northland Press	
1974	Frank Getlein	The Lure of the Great West	Country Beautiful Corporation	
1975	Harold G. Davison	Edward Borein: Cowboy Artist	Doubleday and Company	
1976	Emmie D. Mygatt and Roberta Carkeek Cheney	Hans Kleiber: Artist of the Bighorn Mountains	Caxton Printers	
1977	No award given			
1978	John K. Goodman	Ross Stefan: An Impressionistic Painter of the Contemporary Southwest	Northland Press	
1979	Searles R. Boynton	The Painter Lady: Grace Carpenter Hudson	Interface Corporation	
1980	Sandra Dallas	Sacred Paint: Ned Jacob	Fenn Galleries Publishing	
1981	Patricia Janis Broder	Taos: A Painter's Dream	New York Graphic Society	
1982	Larry Pointer and Donald Goddard	Harry Jackson	Harry N. Abrams	
1983	William Albert Allard	Vanishing Breed: Photographs of the Cowboy and the West	New York Graphic Society/Little, Brown & Co.	
1984	Forrest Fenn	The Beat of the Drum and the Whoop of the Dance		
1985	Jose Cisneros	Riders Across the Centuries	Texas Westerners Press	
1986	David J. Weber	Richard H. Kern: Expeditionary Artist in the Far Southwest, 1848-1853	University of New Mexico Press	
1987	Edwin L. Wade	Arts of the North American Indian	Hudson Hills Press	
1988	Frederick J. Dockstander	Song of the Loom; New Traditions in Navajo Weaving	Hudson Hills Press	
1989	Lois Essary Jacka and Jerry D. Jacka	Beyond Tradition: Contemporary Indian Art and its Evolution	Northland Publishing	
1990	Laura Wilson	Watt Matthews of Lambshead	Texas State Historical Association	
1991	Alan Axelrod	Art of the Golden West	Abbeville Press	
1992	Nancy K. Anderson and Linda S. Ferber	Albert Bierstadt: Art and Enterprise	Hudson Hills Press	
1993	Howard Terpning and Elmer Kelton	The Art of Howard Terpning	Bantam Doubleday Dell and Greenwich Workshop	
1994	Brian W. Dippie	Charles M. Russell, Word Painter	Arnon Carter	
1995	Rick Stewart	Charles M. Russell - Sculptor	Arnon Carter	
1996	Patricia Trenton	Independent Spirits: Women Painters of the American West, 1890-1945	Autry Museum of Western Heritage	
1997	Anne Morand	Thomas Moran: The Field Sketches	University of Oklahoma Press	
1998	Nancy Anderson	Thomas Moran	Yale University Press	
1999	Phil Kovinick and Marian Yoshiki-Kovinick	An Encyclopedia of Women Artists of the American West	University of Texas Press	
2000	Larry Len Peterson	Charles M. Russell, Legacy	Falcon Publishing	
2001	Kurt Markus	Cowpuncher	Wild Horse Island Press	
2002	Larry Len Peterson	Philip R. Goodwin: America's Sporting and Wildlife Artist	Coeur d' Alene Art Auction	
2003	Michael Duty	Cowboy Artists of America	The Greenwich Workshop Press	
2004	Nancy K. Anderson	Frederic Remington: The Color of Night	Princeton University Press	
2005	Don Hedgpeth	Joe Beeler: Life of a Cowboy Artist	Diamond Tail Press	
2006	Joni L. Kinsey	Thomas Moran's West: Chromolithography, High Art and Popular Taste	University Press of Kansas	
2008	B. Byron Price	Charles M. Russell: A Catalogue Raisonne	University of Oklahoma Press	
2009	Peter H. Hassrick and Elizabeth J. Cunningham	In Contemporary Rhythm: The Art of Ernest L. Blumenschein	University of Oklahoma Press	
2010	Joan Carpenter Troccoli	The Masterworks of Charles M. Russell: A Retrospective of Paintings and Sculpture	University of Oklahoma Press	
2011	Don Hedgpeth	Robert Lougheed Follow the Sun	Diamond Trail Press	
2012	Jane Ford Aebersold, Christina E. Burke, James Peck, B. Byron Price, W. Jackson Rushing III, Mary Jo Watson and Mark A. White	The Eugene B. Adkins Collection: Selected Works	University of Oklahoma Press	
2013	Adam Duncan Harris	Bob Kuhn: Drawing on Instinct	University of Oklahoma Press	
2014	W. Raymond Wood and Robert M. Lindholm	Karl Bodmer's America Revisited: Landscape Views Across Time	University of Oklahoma Press	
2015	Jennifer Bottomly-O'Looney and Kirby Lambert	Montana's Charlie Russell: Art in the Collection of the Montana Historical Society	Montana Historical Society Press	
2016	Peter H. Hassrick and Mindy N. Besaw	Painted Journeys		
2017	Susan Hallsten McGarry	Pure Quill: Photographs by Barbara Van Cleve	SF Design/Fresco Books	
2018	Thomas Brent Smith and Mary-Dailey Desmarais	Once Upon a Time...The Western: A New Frontier in Art and Film	5 Continents Editions/Denver Art Museum and Montreal Museum of Fine Arts	

==== Folklore Books ====
Year	Author(s)	Novel	Publisher or publication	Ref.
1978	Bill Brett	The Stolen Steers: A Tale of the Big Thicket	Texas A&M University Press	

==== Juvenile Books ====
Year	Author(s)	Novel	Publisher or publication	Ref.
1962	Gene Caesar	King of the Mountain men	E. P. Dutton & Co.	
1963	Charles Clifton	The Book of the West	Bobbs-Merrill Co.	
1964	Betty Baker	Killer-of-Death	Harper & Row	
1965	Paul Iselin Wellman	The Greatest Cattle Drive	Houghlin-Mifflin Co.	
1966	Carl G. Hodges	Land Rush	Duell-Sloan-Pearce Co.	
1967	Marguerite Henry	Mustang: Wild Spirit of the West	Rand McNalley and Co.	
1968	Eric Scott	Down the Rivers, Westward Ho!	Meredith Press	
1969	Weyman B. Jones	Edge of Two Worlds	Dial Press	
1970	Jessie Hosford	An Awful Name to Live Up To	Meredith Press	
1971	Betty Baker	And One Was a Wooden Indian	The Macmillan Co.	
1972	Richard Edward Wormser	The Black Mustanger	William Morrow & Co.	
1975	Harold Keith	Susy's Scoundrel	Thomas Y. Crowell Co.	
1976	N. Scott Momaday	Owl in the Cedar Tree	Northland Press	
1979	Harold Keith	The Obstinate Land	Thomas Y. Crowell Co.	
1980	Barbara M. Walker	The Little House Cookbook	Harper & Row	
1984	Russell Freedman	Children of the Wild West	Clarion Books	
1986	Pam Conrad	Prairie Songs	Harper & Row	
1987	Arlene B. Hirshfelder	Happily May I Walk	Charles Scribner's	
1988	Lynn H. Scott	The Covered Wagon and Other Adventures	University of Nebraska Press	
1989	Francis G. Tunbo	Stay Put, Robbie McAmis	Texas Christian University Press	
1990	Marj Gurasich	Letters to Oma	Texas Christian University Press	
1991	Diane Johnston Hamm	Bunkhouse Journal	High Plains Press	
1992	Vee Brown and Baje Whitehorne?	Monster Slayer: A Navajo Folktale	Northland Press	
1993	Russell Freedman	An Indian Winter	Holiday House	
1994	Albert Marrin	Cowboys, Indians and Gunfighters	Maxwell Macmillan International	
1995	Robert Crum	Eagle Drum	Simon & Schuster	
1996	Linda Theresa Raczek and Katalin Olah Ehling?	The Night the Grandfathers Dance	Northland Publishing	
1997	Dayton Duncan	The West	Little, Brown and Company	
1998	Diane Johnston Hamm	Daughter of Suqua	Albert Whitman & Company	
1999	Kathryn Lasky	Alice Rose & Sam	Hyperion Books for Children	
2000	Louise Erdrich	The Birchbark House	Hyperion Books for Children	
2001	Sharon E. Heisel	Precious Gold, Precious Jade	Holiday House	
2002	Jo Harper	Delfino's Journey	Texas Tech University	
2003	Lisa Waller Rogers	The Great Storm: The Hurricane Diary of J.T. King	Texas Tech University Press	
2004	Hershell H. Nixon	The Long Way West	Texas Tech University Press	
2005	Simon J. Ortiz	The Good Rainbow Road	University of Arizona Press	
2006	Charlotte Foltz Jones	Westward Ho! Eleven Explorers of the American West	Holiday House	
2007	James M. McPherson	Into The West: From Reconstruction To The Final Days Of The American Frontier	Atheneum Books for Young Readers/Simon & Schuster Children's Publishing	
2008	Melodie A. Cuate	Journey to San Jacinto	Texas Tech University Press	
2009	Melodie A. Cuate	Journey to Gonzales	Texas Tech University Press	
2010	Suzanne Morgan Williams	Bull Rider	McElderry Books/Simon & Schuster Childrens Publishing	
2011	Michael P. Spradlin and Layne Johnson	Off Like the Wind! The First Ride of the PonyExpress	Walker & Company	
2012	Emerita Romero-Anderson	Milagro of the Spanish Bean Pot		
2013	Sandra Dallas	The Quilt Walk	Sleeping Bear Press	
2014	Nasario Garcia	Grandmas Santo on Its Head/El santo patas arriba de mi abuelita	University of New Mexico Press	
2015	Linda L. Osmundson	How The West Was Drawn: Women's Art	Pelican Publishing Company Inc.	
2016	Mike Kearby	"Texas Tales Illustrated: The Trail Drives"		
2017	S.J. Dahlstrom	The Green Colt	Paul Dry Books	
2018	Lois V. Harris	Lotta Crabtree: Gold Rush Fairy Star	Pelican Publishing Co.	

==== Magazine Article ====
Year	Author(s)	Novel	Publisher or publication	Ref.
1961	W. Bruce Bell	"The Old Chisholm Trail"	Kiwanis Magazine	
1962	Mari Sandoz	"The Look of the Last Frontier"	American Heritage	
1963	George R. Stewart	"The Prairie Schooner Got Them There"	American Heritage	
1964	Herman Lehmann	"Nine Years Among the Indians"	Frontier Times	
1965	J. Frank Dobie	"Titans of Western Art"	The American Scene	
1966	Donald Dean Jackson	"How Lost Was Zebulon Pike"	American Heritage	
1967	Jack Guinn	"The Red Man's Last Struggle"	Empire Magazine/Denver Post	
1968	Carolyn Woirhaye	"The Snows of Rimrock Ridge"	The Farm Quarterly	
1969	Donnie D. Good	"W. R. Leigh: The Artist's Studio Collection"	The American Scene	
1970	May Howell Dobson	"Bennett Howell's Cow Country"	Frontier Times	
1971	James Edsall Serven	"Cattle, Guns and Cowboys"	Arizona Highways	
1972	David Humphreys Miller	"Echoes of the Little Big Horn"	American Heritage	
1973	James Edsall Serven "Horses of the West"	Arizona Highways		
1974	Spike Van Cleve	"40 Years Gatherins"	The Dude Rancher	
1975	James R. Jennings	"George Humphreys, Half Century with 6666"	Quarter Horse Journal	
1976	Patricia Janis Broder	"The Pioneer Woman: Image in Bronze"	American Art Review	
1977	No award given			
1978	John L. Sinclair	"Where the Cowboys Hunkered Down"	New Mexico Magazine	
1979	Richard Rhodes	"The Farther Continent of James Clyman"	American Heritage	
1980	David McCullough and Tomas Sennett	"Glory Days in Medora"	GEO Magazine	
1981	William Broyles Jr.	"The King Ranch, The Last Empire"	Texas Monthly	
1982	Alice J. Hall	"Buffalo Bill and the Enduring West"	National Geographic	
1983	Patricia Nell Warren	"Saga of an American Ranch"	Reader's Digest	
1984	Tom Blasingame	"Eight Decades a Cowboy"	The Quarter Horse Journal	
1985	Max Evans "Showdown at Hollywood Park"	Southern Horseman Magazine		
1986	John L. Sinclair	"Santa Rita del Cobre"	New Mexico Magazine	
1987	C. L. Sonnichsen	"The Remodeling of Geronimo"	Arizona Highways	
1988	Robert A. Trennart	"Fairs, Expositions and the Changing Image of Southwestern Indians, 1976-1904"	New Mexico Historical Review	
1989	E. N. Coons	"Blizzard"	American Heritage	
1990	Oakley Hall	"Powder River Country"	American Heritage	
1991	Jerry Keenan	"Yellowstone Kelly"	Montana The Magazine of Western History	
1992	Kathryn Marshall	"Strange and Benevolent Monsters"	American Way Magazine	
1993	Peter H. Hassrick	"Western Art Museums: A Question of Style or Content"	Montana The Magazine of Western History	
1994	Raphael Cristy	"Charlie's Hidden Agenda,"	Montana The Magazine of Western History	
1995	Robert Draper	"The Twilight of the Texas Rangers"	Texas Monthly	
1996	Paul Andrew Hutton	"Showdown At the Hollywood Corral"	Montana The Magazine of Western History	
1997	Greg Michno	"Lakota Noon At The Greasy Grass"	Wild West Magazine/Cowles History Group	
1998	Dan L. Flores	"When The Buffalo Roamed"	Wild West Magazine/Cowles History Group	
1999	Paul Andrew Hutton	"T. R. Takes Charge"	American History	
2000	Lou Dean	"Halloween Hermit"	Guideposts	
2001	Renee Kientz	"The Gillette Brothers"	Houston Chronicle	
2002	Sally Denton	"What Happened at Mountain Meadows?"	American Heritage	
2003	Robert Utley	"Tales of the Texas Rangers"	American Heritage Magazine	
2004	Paul A. Canada	"The Water Crisis Continues"	The Paint Horse Journal/American Paint Horse Association	
2005	Paul Andrew Hutton	"‘It was but a Small Affair': The Battle of the Alamo"	Wild West	
2006	Jeffrey V. Pearson	"Tragedy at Red Cloud Agency: The Surrender, Confinement, and Death of Crazy Horse"	Montana – The Magazine of Western History	
2007	John R. Erickson	"Six Days Ablaze"	American Cowboy Magazine	
2008	Paul Hutton	"Silver Screen Desperado: Billy the Kid in the Movies"	New Mexico Historical Review	
2009	Dan Flores	"Bringing Home All the Pretty Horses"	Montana, The Magazine of Western History	
2010	John H. Monnett	"My Heart Now Has Become Changed to Softer Feelings"	Montana, The Magazine of Western History	
2011	Frederick J. Chiaventone	"Taking Stock of the Pony Express"	Wild West Magazine/Weider History Group	
2012	Louis Kraft	"When Wynkoop Was Sheriff"	Wild West Magazine/Weider History Group	
2013	Jim Logan	"The Other Trail"	Oklahoma Today	
2014	Dan Flores	"Coyote: An American Original"	Wild West Magazine/Weider History Group	
2015	Bob Welch	"Not For Sale"	American Cowboy Magazine	
2016	Renee M. Laegreid	"Finding the American West in Twenty-First Century Italy"		
2017	Gabriella Schiavino	"Warriors to Ride the River With"	American Cowboy Magazine	
2018	Gregory Nickerson	"All American Indian Days and the Miss Indian America Pageant"	Montana The Magazine of Western History	
2019	Christine Hamilton, Ross Hecox and Susan Morrison	"Long Live the King"		
2020	David Beyreis	""If You had Fought Bravely I would have Sung for You” The Changing Roles of Cheyenne Women During Nineteenth-Century Plains Warfare"		
2021	Tempe J. Javitz	"Transitions in the Changing West: The Photographic Legacy of Jessamine Spear Johnson"		
2022	Tracey Hanshew	"Here She Comes, Wearin’ Them Britches!"	Montana The Magazine of Western History	
2023	Matthew Kerns	"Texas Jack Takes an Encore"	Wild West Magazine/HistoryNet	

==== News Featurette ====
Year	Author(s)	Novel	Publisher or publication	Ref.
1991	Rodeo Cowboys	Phil Archer (producer), Judy Overton (producer)	KPRC-TV	
1992	Strangers in Their Own Land	Mary Ann Eckstein (producer), Linda Cavanaugh (producer), Randy Williams (director), Tony Stizza (photojournalist)	KFOR-TV	
1993	Matagorda Cattle Drive	Phil Archer (reporter), Kevin Benz (photojournalist)	KPRC-TV	
1994	Orphan Train	Linda Cavanaugh (producer), Tony Stizza (producer), Randy Williams (director), Linda Cavanaugh (reporter), Tony Stizza (photojournalist)	KFOR-TV	
1995	Riders of the Osage	Randy Renner (reporter), Barry Levy (photographer), Dave Tamez (photographer)	KWTV-9	
1996	Good Morning America: Montana Cowgirls	Jeff Jayson, producer; Amy Atkins, reporter.	ABC	
1997	The Vale's Baby	Scott Thompson (reporter), Grand Gerondale (photographer)	KOTV	
1998	Range Riders	John Pronk (reporter and photographer), Melissa Johnson (field producer), Mike Raye (editor)	WFAA-TV	
2001	The Salt Grass Trail	Phill Archer (reporter), Mark Muller (photographer)	KRPC-TV	
2002	The Real Cowboys	Michael Jenkins (reporter), Rob DuPuis (photographer)	KVUE-TV	

==== Nonfiction Book ====
Year	Author(s)	Novel	Publisher or publication	Ref.
1962	Alvin M. Josephy Jr.	The American Heritage Book of Indians	American Heritage Publishing Co.	
1963	John Rolfe Burroughs	Where the Old West Stayed Young	William Morrow & Co.	
1964	John Upton Terrell	Furs by Astor	William Morrow & Co.	
1965	C. Gregory Crampton	Standing Up Country	Alfred A. Knopf, Inc.	
1966	Alvin M. Josephy Jr.	The American Heritage History of the Great West	American Heritage Publishing Co.	
1967	George W. Groh	Gold Fever	William Morrow & Co.	
1968	John Arkas Hawgood	America's Western Frontiers	Alfred A. Knopf, Inc.	
1969	Robert R. Dykstra	The Cattle Towns	Alfred A. Knopf, Inc.	
1969	Laura Gilpin	The Enduring Navaho	University of Texas Press	
1970	Merrill J. Mattes	The Great Platte River Road	Nebraska State Historical Society	
1971	Harry Sinclair Drago	The Great Range Wars	Dodd, Mead & Co.	
1972	Odie B. Faulk and Seymour V. Connor	North America Divided: The Mexican War	Oxford University Press.	
1973	S.L.A. Marshall	Crimsoned Prairie	Charles Scribner's Sons	
1973	Tom McHugh	The Time of the Buffalo	Alfred A. Knopf, Inc.	
1974	George F. Ellis	Bell Ranch As I Knew It	The Lowell Press	
1974	Richard M. Ketchum	Will Rogers, His Life and Times	American Heritage Publishing Co.	
1974	Mike Hanley and Ellis Lucia	Owyhee Trails	Caxton Printers.	
1974	David Muench and N. Scott Mornaday	Colorado Summer/Fall/Winter/Spring	Rand McNally and Co.	
1975	Benjamin Capps	The Warren Wagontrain Raid	Dial Press.	
1975	Robert O. Beatty	Idaho: A Pictorial Overview	Idaho First National Bank	
1975	Roy P. Stewart	Born Grown	Fidelity Bank	
1975	C.L. Sonnichsen	Colonel Greene and the Copper Skyrocket	University of Arizona Press.	
1976	Jeff C. Dykes	Fifty Great Western illustrators	Northland Press	
1976	Turbese Lummis Fiske	Charles F. Lummis: The Man and His West	University of Oklahoma Press	
1976	Don James	Keith Butte's Memory Book	Caxton Printers	
1977	No award given			
1978	Angie Debo	Geronimo: The Man, His Time, his Place	University of Oklahoma Press.	
1978	Time McCoy and Ronald McCoy	Tim McCoy Remembers the West	Doubleday & Co., Inc.	
1979	Nelle Snyder Yost	Buffalo Bill: His Family, Friends, Fame, Failures and Fortunes	Swallow Press	
1980	John D. Unruh Jr.	The Plains Across	University of Illinois Press.	
1981	Bartlett Richard	Bartlett Richards: Nebraska Sandhills Cattleman		
1981	Donald Jackson	Gold Dust: Saga of the Forty-Niners	Allen and Unwin Ltd.	
1982	Russell H. Beatie	Saddles	University of Oklahoma Press	
1982	David Dary	Cowboy Culture: A Saga of Five Centuries	Alfred A. Knopf	
1983	Margaret Maxwell	A Passion for Freedom: The Life of Sharlot Hall	University of Arizona Press	
1983	Bryan and Frances Sterling	A Will Rogers Treasury: Reflections and Observations	Crown Publishers	
1984	Gary E. Moulton	Atlas of the Lewis & Clark Expedition	University of Nebraska Press.	
1985	Francis Paul Prucha	The Great Father	University of Nebraska Press.	
1986	Robert L. Sharp	Bob Sharp's Cattle Country	University of Arizona.	
1987	Robert G. Athearn	The Mythic West in Twentieth Century America	University Press of Kansas.	
1988	Robert Marshall Utley	High Noon in Lincoln: Violence on the Western Frontier	University of New Mexico Press.	
1989	Robert Marshall Utley	Cavalier in Buckskin: Geaorge Armstrong Custer and the Western Military Frontier	University of Oklahoma Press	
1990	Elliot West	Growing Up With the Country	University of New Mexico Press	
1991	Richard W. Slatta	Cowboys of the Americas	Yale University Press	
1992	Richard White	It's Your Misfortune and None of My Own: A New History of the American West	University of Oklahoma Press	
1993	David J. Weber	The Spanish Frontier in North America	Yale University Press	
1994	Terry G. Jordan	North American Cattle-Ranching Frontiers	University of New Mexico Press	
1995	Clyde A. Milner II, Carol A. O'Connor and Martha A. Sandweiss	The Oxford History of the American West	Oxford University Press	
1996	Elliott West	The Way To The West	University of New Mexico Press	
1997	Richard W. Etulain	Re-Imagining The Modern American West: A Century of Fiction, History, and Art	University of Arizona Press	
1998	Louis S. Warren	The Hunter's Game	Yale University Press	
1999	Howard Roberts Lamar	The New Encyclopedia of the American West	Yale University Press	
2000	Michael Wallis	The Real Wild West: The 101 Ranch and the Creation of the American West	St. Martin's Press	
2001	Rovert V. Hine and John Mack Faragher	The American West: A New Interpretive History	Yale University Press	
2002	Dan O'Brien	Buffalo for the Broken Heart	Random House	
2003	Douglas B. Green	Singing in the Saddle	Country Music Foundation Press/Vanderbilt University Press	
2004	Sally Denton	American Massacre	Alfred A. Knopf.	
2005	David Dary	The Oregon Trail: An American Saga	Alfred A. Knopf	
2006	Howard Lamar	Charlie Siringo's West	University of New Mexico Press	
2007	Timothy Egan	The Worst hard Time: The Untold Story of Those Who Survived the Great American Dust Bowl	Houghton Mifflin Company	
2008	Max Evans	For the Love of a Horse	University of New Mexico Press	
2009	Marsha V. Gallagher	The North American Journals of Prince Maximilian of Weid	University of Oklahoma Press	
2010	Elliott West	The Last Indian War: The Nez Perce Story	Oxford University Press	
2011	Will Bagley	So Rugged and Mountainous: Blazing the Trail to Oregon and California, 1812-1848	University of Oklahoma Press	
2012	Paul L. Hedren	After Custer: Loss and Transformation in Sioux Country	University of Oklahoma Press	
2013	Robert M. Utley	Geronimo	Yale University Press	
2014	David M. Wrobel	Global West, American Frontier: Travel, Empire and Exceptionalism form Manifest Destiny to the Great Depression	University of New Mexico Press	
2015	Castle McLaughlin	A Lakota War Book from the Little Bighorn: The Pictographic Autobiography of Half Moon	Peabody Museum Press	
2016	Gary and Margaret Kraisinger	The Western Cattle Trail		
2017	Dan Flores	American Serengeti: The Last Big Animals of the Great Plains	University Press of Kansas	
2018	Steve Friesen	Lakota Performers in Europe: Their Culture and the Artifacts	University Press of Oklahoma Press	

==== Outstanding Photography Book ====
Year	Author(s)	Novel	Publisher or publication	Ref.
2005	Debra Bloomfield	Four Corners	University of New Mexico Press	
2006	Robb Kendrick	Revealing Character: Texas Tintypes	Bright Sky Press	
2007	Stephen Trimble	Lasting Light – 125 Years of Grand Canyon Photography	Northland Publishing	
2008	Nancy Wood	Eye of the West	University of New Mexico Press	
2009	Paul Mobley and Katrina Fried	American Farmer: The Heart of Our Country	Welcome Books	
2010	Craig Varjabedian	Ghost Ranch and the Faraway Nearby	University of New Mexico Press	
2011	Krstina L. Southwell and John R. Lovett	Life at the Kiowa, Comanche, and Wichita Agency	University of Oklahoma Press	
2012	J. Don Cook	Shooting from the Hip: Photographs and Essays	University of Oklahoma Press	
2013	Rich Clarkson and James C. McNutt	National Geographic Greatest Photographs of the American West	National Geographic Books	
2014	Andy Wilkinson	A Family of the Land: The Texas Photography of Guy Gillette	University of Oklahoma Press	
2015	Debra Bloomfield	Wilderness	University of New Mexico Press	
2016	Lee Marmon and Tom Corbett	Laguna Pueblo	University of New Mexico Press	
2017	No award given			
2018	Thomas Brent Smith and Mary-Dailey Desmarais	Once Upon a Time...The Western: A New Frontier in Art and Film	5 Continents Editions/Denver Art Museum/Montreal Museum of Fine Arts	
2023	Anouk Krantz	Ranchland: Wagonhound	ACC Art Books / Images Publishing	
2024	Tempe Javitz	Bighorn Visions: The Photography of Jessamine Spear Johnson	South Dakota Historical Society Press	

==== Poetry Book ====
Year	Author(s)	Novel	Publisher or publication	Ref.
1973	George Keithley	The Donner Party	George Brazziller	
1974-1985	No awards given			
1986	Hal Cannon	Cowboy Poetry: A Gathering	Gibbs M. Smith	
1987	Hal Cannon (editor)	Songs of the Sage: The Poetry of Curley Fletcher	Gibbs M. Smith	
1988	No award given			
1989	Lois Prante Stevens and Jewell Malm Newburn	Pomo, Dawn of Song	California History Center	
1990	Walter McDonal	Rafting the Brazos	University of North Texas Press	
1991	Jane Candia Coleman	No Roof But Sky	High Plains Press	
1992	Walter McDonald	The Digs in Escondido Canyon	Texas Tech University Press	
1993	Walter McDonald	All that Matters	Texas Tech University Press	
1994	Thomas West and Hal Cannon (editors)	Buckaroo: Visions and Voices of the American Cowboy	Calloway/Simon & Schuster	
1995	Jane Candia Coleman	The Red Drum	High Plains Press	
1996	Anne Heath Widmark (editor)	Between Earth And Sky: Poets Of The Cowboy West	W.W. Norton & Company	
1997	Paul Zarzyski	All this Way For The Short Ride	Museum of New Mexico Press	
1998	J.B. Allen	The Medicine Keepers	Grey Horse Press	
1999	Andy Wilkinson	My Cowboy's Gift	Grey Horse Press	
2000	Walt McDonald and Janet Jeugebauer	Whatever The Wind Delivers	Texas Tech University Press	
2001	Linda Hasselstrom	Bitter Creek Junction	High Plains Press	
2002	Linda Hussa	Blood Sister, I Am To These Fields	Black Rock Press	
2003	Larry D. Thomas	Amazing Grace	Texas Review Press	
2004	Miles Wilson	Harm: Poems	University of Nevada Press	
2005	Stacy Gillett Coyle	Cloud Seeding	High Plains Press	
2006	Mary Beath	Refuge of whirling light	University of New Mexico	
2007	Bruce Roseland	The Last Buffalo	North Dakota Institute for Regional Studies.	
2008	David Mason	Ludlow	Red Hen Press	
2009	John Dofflemyer	Poems from Dry Creek	Starhaven	
2010	Jeanetta Calhoun Mish	Work Is Love Made Visible	West End Press	
2011	Ken Hada	Spare Parts	Mongrel Empire Press	
2012	Patricia Frolander	Married Into It	High Plains Press	
2013	John Dofflemyer	Proclaiming Space	Dry Crik Press	
2014	Caroline Joy "CJ" Hadley (editor)	Brushstroke's and Balladeers	Range Conservation Foundation & Range Magazine	
2015	Larry D. Thomas	The Goatherd	Maria Maloney/Mouthfeel Press	
2016	Red Shuttleworth	Woe to the Land Shadowing	Blue Horse Press	
2017	Tiffany Midge	The Woman Who Married a Bear: Poems	University of New Mexico Press	
2018	Karla Morton	Wooden Lions	Texas Review Press	

==== Short Stories ====
Year	Author(s)	Novel	Publisher or publication	Ref.
1961	Steve Frazee	"All Legal and Proper"	Ellery Queen Magazine	
1962	Fred Grove	"Comanche Son"	Boy's Life	
1963-1990	No awards given			
1991	Roland Sodowsky	"Interim in Desert"	Texas Christian University Press	
1992	Jane Candia Coleman	"Stories From Mesa Country"	Swallow Press/Ohio University Press	
1993	Judy Alter	"Fool Girl"	This Place of Memory (Texas Christian University)	
1994	Robert R. Gass	"Three Lakota Women"	The Tampa Tribune	
1995	John Jakes	"Manitow and Ironhand"	New Trails (Doubleday)	
1996	Robert Flynn	"Living with the Hyenas"	Texas Christian University Press	
1997	David Kranes	"Salvage"	Low Tide in the Desert: Nevada Stories (University of Nevada Press)	
1998	Judy Alter	"Sue Ellen Learns To Dance"	Texas Short Stories (Browder Springs Press)	
1999-2000	No awards given			
2001	Loren D. Estleman	"Iron Dollar"	Berkley Books	
2002	Ray Gonzalez	"The Ghost of John Wayne"	University of Arizona Press	

==== Western Novel ====
Year	Author(s)	Novel	Publisher or publication	Ref.
1962	James David Horan	The Shadow Catcher	Crown Publishers	
1963	Edward Abbey	Fire on the Mountain	Dial Press	
1964	Robert A. Roripaugh	Honor Thy Father	William Morrow and Co.	
1965	Thomas Berger	Little Big Man	Dial Press	
1966	Vardis Fisher	Mountain Man	William Morrow & Co.	
1967	Bill Gulick	They Came to a Valley	Doubleday & Co., Inc.	
1968	Robert Flynn	North to Yesterday	Alfred A. Knopf, Inc.	
1969	The Buffalo Runners	Fred Grove	Doubleday & Co., Inc.	
1970	Benjamin Capps	The White Man's Road	Harper & Row	
1971	A.B. Guthrie	Arfive	Dodd, Mead and Co.	
1972	Frank Waters	Pike's Peak: A Family Saga	The Swallow Press	
1973	Will Henry	Chiricahua	J.B. Lippincott Co.	
1974	Elmer Kelton	The Time It Never Rained	Doubleday & Co.	
1975	James A. Michener	Centennial	Random House Publishers	
1976-1977	No awards given			
1978	Dorothy M. Johnson	Buffalo Woman	Dodd, Mead and Co.	
1979	Elmer Kelton	The Good Old Boys	Doubleday & Co. Inc.	
1980	Ruth Beebe Hill	Hanta Yo	Doubleday & Co. Inc.	
1981-1983	No awards given			
1984	Frank Calkins	The Long Riders' Winter	Doubleday & Co. Inc.	
1985	Ivan Doig	English Creek	Atheneum Publishers	
1986	A.B. Guthrie, Jr.	Playing Catch-Up	Houghton Mifflin Co.	
1987	Greg Matthews	Heart of the Country	W. W. Norton and Co.	
1988	Elmer Kelton	The Man Who Rode Midnight	Doubleday & Co. Inc.	
1989	Glendon Swarthout	The Homesman	Weidenfeld & Nicolson	
1990	Chad Oliver	Broken Eagle	Bantam Books	
1991	Larry McMurtry	Buffalo Girls	Simon & Schuster	
1992	Judith Freeman	Set for Life	W. W. Norton and Co.	
1993	Cormac McCarthy	All the Pretty Horses	Alfred A. Knopf Inc.	
1994	Barbara Kingsolver	Pigs in Heaven	HarperCollins Publishers	
1995	Max Evans	Bluefeather Fellini in the Sacred Realm	University Press of Colorado	
1996	Jane Kirkpatrick	A Sweetness To The Soul	Questar Publishers	
1997	Kate Lehrer	Out Of Eden	Harmony Books	
1998	Rilla Askew	The Mercy Seat	Viking Books	
1999	Loren D. Estleman	Journey of the Dead	Forge Books	
2000	Dan O'Brien	The Contract Surgeon	The Lyons Press	
2001	Stephen Harrigan	Gates of the Alamo	Alfred A. Knopf Inc.	
2002	Loren D. Estleman	The Master Executioner	Forge Books	
2003	Frederick J. Chiaventone	Moon of Bitter Cold	Forge Books	
2004	Johnny Boggs	Spark on the Prairie: The Trial of the Kiowa Chiefs	Signet	
2005	Randy Lee Eickhoff	And Not to Yield	Tom Doherty Associates	
2006	Rosemary Agonito and Joseph Agonito	Buffalo Calf Road Woman, The Story of a Warrior of the Little Bighorn	The Globe Pequot Press/Two Dot Books	
2007	Alan Geoffrion	Broken Trail	Fulcrum Publishing	
2008	Rilla Askew	Harpsong	University of Oklahoma Press	
2009	Mary Clearman Blew	Jackalope Dreams	University of Nebraska Press	
2010	Dusty Richards	The Sundown Chaser	Berkley Books Penguin Group	
2011	Gabrielle Burton	Impatient with Desire	Hyperion Books	
2012	Thomas Fox Averill	Rode	University of New Mexico	
2013	D.B. Jackson	Unbroke Horses	Goldminds Publishing	
2014	Philipp Meyer	The Son	Harper Collins	
2015	Michael Zimmer	The Poacher's Daughter	Five Star/Cengage Gale	
2016	C.J. Box	Endangered: A Joe Pickett Novel		
2017	Robert Knott	Robert B. Parker's Blackjack	G. P. Putnam's Sons	
2018	Matthew P. Mayo	Stranded: A Story of Frontier Survival	Five Star Publishing	

=== Music ===
==== Outstanding New Artist ====
Year	Creator(s)	Work	Publisher or publication	Ref.
2008	Lynn Anderson	"Cowgirl"	Showboat Records	
2009	Gary S. Pratt	"The Other Side"		
2010	Steve Moulton	"Cowboys & Campfires"		

==== New Horizons ====
Year	Creator(s)	Work	Publisher or publication	Ref.
2013	Miss Devon & the Outlaw, Rich O'Brien (producer)	Where in the Dickens RU?		
2014	Mikki Daniel	Gota Be A Cowgirl		
2015	Hannah Huston			
2016	No award given			
2017	Trinity Seely			

==== Music ====
Year	Creator(s)	Work	Publisher or publication	Ref.
1961	Dimitri Tiomkin (composer)	The Alamo		
1962	William J. May	"Charles Russell Cantata"	Historical Society of Montana	
1964	Alfred Newman (music), Ken Darby (lyrics)	"How the West Was Won"		
1965	Rudy Schrager (composer), Herschel Burke Gilbert (composer), Bernard L. Kowalski (director), Bruce Geller (producer)	Rawhide: "Damon's Road"		
1966	Elmer Bernstein (score), Ernie Sheldon (lyrics)	"Hallelujah Trail"		
1967	No award given			
1968	Robert Russel Bennett (composer)	Project Twenty: "The End of the Trail"		
1970	Elmer Bernstein (score), Don Black (score)	"True Grit"		
1971	John Parker (composer)	Gunsmoke: "Snowtrain"		
1972	John Williams (score)	"The Cowboys"		
1973	Dominic Frontiere (score)	"The Train Robbers"		
1974	Elmer Bernstein (score)	"Cahill U.S. Marshall"		
1975	David Rose (composer)	"Little House on the Prairie"		
1976	Alex North (score)	"Bite the Bullet"		
1977	No award given			
1978	Jerry Fielding (score)	"The Outlaw Josie Wales"		
1979	Michael Small (score)	"Comes a Horseman"		
1980	Bob Cobert (score)	"Last Ride of the Daltons"		
1981	Charles Gross (score)	"Heartland"		
1982	Jim Bob Tinsley (author)	"He Was Singin' This Song"		
1983	No award given			
1984	Charlie Seemann (annotator, programmer)	"Back in the Saddle Again"		
1985	Jimmy Webb (composer)	"The Cowboy Hall of Fame"		
1986-1988	No awards given			
1989	Kyle Evans (composer), Gene Breeden (producer)	"Celebrate the Century"		
1990	Muzzie Braun (composer, producer)	"Muzzie Braun and the Little Braun Brothers"		
1991	Riders in the Sky (lyrics, music)	"The Line Rider"	Buzz Stone/MCA Records	

==== Outstanding Original Western Composition ====
Year	Creator(s)	Work	Publisher or publication	Ref.
1992	Michael Martin Murphey (composer, recording artist), Wendy Waldman (lyrics), Carol Elliott (lyrics)	Cowboy Christmas: "Corn, Water and Wood"		
1993	Gary McMahan (composer), Douglas B. Green (composer), Gary McMahan (producer), Chris Camp (producer)	A Cowboyin' Day: "The First Cowboy Song"		
1994	Red Steagall (composer, recording artist), Steve Gibson (producer)	Born to this Land: "Born to this Land"	Warner Western; Warner Brothers Records	
1995	Andy Wilkinson (composer, recording artist), Lloyd Maines (producer)	"Charlie Goodnight: His Life"		
1996	Red Steagall (composer, recording artist), Steve Gibson (producer), Mark Abbot (lyrics), Richard O'Brien (lyrics), Buck Reams (lyrics)	"Faith And Values"		
1997	The Road Is Still The Road: "The Freedom Song"	Andy Wilkinson (composer, recording artist), Lloyd Maines (producer), Kerry Ford (producer)	Grey Horse Press	
1998	Red Steagall (composer, recording artist), Steve Gibson (producer)	"Dear Mama, I'm A Cowboy"	Warner Western Production Company	
1999	Michael Martin Murphey (composer, recording artist), Joey Miskulin (producer)	"Summer Ranges"	Westfest Records	
2000	Sons of the San Joaquin (recording artists), Jack Hannah (composer), Baxter Black (composer), Rich O'Brien (producer)	"He Just Can't Be Seen From the Road"	Western Jubilee Recording Company	
2001	Jack Hannah, Sons of the San Joaquin (recording artists), Rich O'Brien (producer), Scott O'Malley (producer)	Sing One For The Cowboy: "Charlie and the Boys"	Western Jubilee Recording Company	
2002	Cindy Walker (composer) Rich O'Brien (recording artist)	"Old Town Taos"		
2003	Ian Tyson (composer, recording artist), Rich Fenton (producer)	Live at Longview: "Bob Fudge"	Stony Plain Recording Company	
2004	Don Edwards (composer)	"Chant of the Night Songs"		
2005	Dale Burson (composer, recording artist)	Dancing With Daddy: "A Life More Than This"		
2006	Red Steagall and Rich O'Brien	The Wind, The Wire And The Rail: "How Green Was The Grazin' Back Then"		
2007	Michael Martin Murphey (composer, recording artist)	Hearland Cowboy: Cowboy Songs, Vol. 5: "Long and Lonesome Ride to Dalhart"		
2008	Red Steagall (recording artist), Rich O'Brien (producer)	"Dawson Le Gate"		
2009	Red Steagall (recording artist), Dan Roberts (composer), Roy Robinson (composer), Bobby Wood (composer)	"A Cowboys Special Christmas"		
2010	LeRoy Jones, Dave Copenhaver (producer), Terry Scarberry (producer), LeRoy Jones (producer)	"The Great Western Trail"		
2011	R.W. Hampton (composer, recording artist), Joe DiBlasi (producer), Gary Bright (producer)	Austin To Boston: "Shortgrass"		
2012	R.J. Vandygriff (recording artist), Ronny Light (producer)	"Keep the Campfire A Burnin"		
2013	Waddie Mitchell (composer)	"Trade Off by The Gillette Brothers"		
2014	Eli Barsi	"Portrait of a Cowgirl"		
2015	Wylie & the Wild West (recording artists)	"Where Horses are Heroes"		
2016	Mary Kaye	"Ride a Wide Circle"		
2017	Ryan Fritz (recording artist), Eli Barsi (producer), John Cunningham (producer)	"Keeper of the West"		
2018	K.R. Wood (recording artist), Michael Martin Murphey (recording artist), K. R. Wood (composer)	"A Nickel A Head"		

==== Outstanding Traditional Western Album ====
Year	Creator(s)	Work	Publisher or publication	Ref.
1992	Don Edwards (recording artist)	Chant of the Wanderer		
1993	Buck Ramsey (recording artist), Lanny Fiel, Joe Stephenson (producer), Buck Ramsey (producer)	Rolling Uphill from Texas		
1994	John McEwen (composer)	The Wild West	Mogull Entertainment	
1995	Buck Ramsey (composer, recording artist), Lanny Fiel (producer), Buck Ramsey (producer)	My House It Was In Texas		
1996	Riders In The Sky (recording artists), Joey Miskulin (producer)	Always Drink Upstream From The Herd		
1997	Don Edwards (recording artist), Jim Rooney (producer)	West Of Yesterday	Warner Western Production Company	
1998	Robert Wagoner (recording artist)	The Wonder Of It All		
1999	David Wilkie (composer, recording artist)	Cowboy Ceilidh	Red House Records	
2000	Red Steagall (composer, recording artist), Steve Gibson (producer)	Love of the West	Warner Brothers	
2001	Don Edwards (recording artist), Waddie Mitchell (recording artist), Fort Worth Symphony Orchestra (recording artist), Rich O'Brien (producer), Kathleen Fox Collins (producer)	A Prairie Portrait	Western Jubilee Recording Company	
2002	Don Edwards (recording artist), Rich O'Brien (producer)	Kin To The Wind/Memories of Marty Robbins	Western Jubilee Recording Company	
2003	Red Steagall (recording artist), Rich O'Brien (producer)	Wagon Tracks	Western Jubilee Recording Company	
2004	Buck Ramsey (recording artist, posthumanous), Charlie Seemann	Buck Ramsey: Hittin' The Trail	Smithsonian Folkways Recordings; Western Folklife Center	
2005	Les Gilliam (recording artist), Jim Farrell (producer)	It's Time To Sing A Song	Prairie Rose Records	
2006	Sons of the San Joaquin (recording artist), Rich O'Brien (producer)	Way Out Yonder	Western Jubilee Recording Company	
2007	Don Edwards (recording artist)	Moonlight and Skies	Western Jubilee Recording Company	
2008	R.W. Hampton (recording artist), Rich O'Brien (producer), Edna Mae Holden (executive producer)	Oklahoma...Where the West Remains		
2009	Juni Fisher (composer, recording artist), Rich O'Brien (producer)	Gone for Colorado		
2010	Andy Wilkinson (recording artist), Andy Hedges (recording artist), Lloyd Maines (producer)	Welcome to the Tribe		
2011	Gillette Brothers (recording artist), Craig Swancey (producer)	Gillette Brothers Cowboys, Mistrels and Medicine Shows		
2012	Dan Roberts (recording artist), Roberts Allsup (producer), Tommy Allsup (producer)	'Dan Roberts: The Best Of (Vol. 1)		
2013	Bill Barwick (recording artist), Jim Ratts (producer)	The Usual Suspects		
2014	Don Edwards (recording artist)	Just Me And My Guitar		
2015	Randy Huston (recording artist), Hannah Huston (recording artist), Randy Huston (producer)	Cowboys and Girls		
2016	Waddie Mitchell & Pipp Gillette (recording artists)	Singing Songs by Waddie & Pipp		
2017	Doug Figgs, Jim Jones and Mariam (recording artists)	The Cowboy Way		
2018	Maye Kaye	Take Me Back to Texas	Don't Fence Me In Records	

== Special categories ==
=== Trustees Award ===
Year	Recipient(s)	Notes	Ref.
1965	Tim Babcock	For World's Fair Display on the American West	
1965	W. E. McIntosh	Principal chief of the Creek Nation	
1967	University of Oklahoma Press	For publication of Western Americana	
1967	Ben K. West	For service to the Western Heritage Awards Committee	
1970	Arizona Highways Magazine		
1970	Swiss National Television Network	For Far West: The Indians	
1971	Yakima Canutt	For more than 50 years of outstanding contributions to motion pictures.	
1972	John Rolfe Burroughs	For Guardian of the Grasslands	
1972	John Ford	For outstanding contribution to the motion picture industry.	
1972	Dorothy Harmsen	For Harmsens Western Americana	
1972	Winchester-Western		
1972	Wyoming Stock Growers Association		
1973	Dale Robertson	For Outstanding Contribution to Western Film.	
1973	William H. Clothier	For Outstanding Contribution to the Motion Picture industry through Cinema photography.	
1973	Ben K. Green	For unique contribution to the pure enjoyment of our western heritage and knowledge of an heretofore unconsidered aspect of this heritage in Some More Horse Tradin.	
1973	Agnes Spring	For Outstanding Contribution to Preservation of Western Heritage as historian.	
1974	Dimitri Tiomkin	For Outstanding Musical Contribution to Western Motion Pictures.	
1974	Alfrey Y. Allee	For Outstanding Career as a Courageous Texas Ranger.	
1974	Carl G. Degen, Jr.	For Excellent Educational Western Documentary film, The Excavation of Mound Seven.	
1974	Howard Hawks	For Outstanding Contribution to the West through Motion Pictures.	
1974	Luke Short	For illustrious career as an author of western stories.	
1974	Korczak Ziolkowski	For unique contribution to preserving Western Heritage through the Crazy Horse Memorial.	
1975	James Whitmore	For Superb One-Man Show based on the Life of the illustrious Will Rogers.	
1975	Robert Adams	For The Architecture and Art of Early Hispanic Colorado, which best illuminates a little known aspect of the American West.	
1975	Delmer Daves	For outstanding contribution as director and producer of great Western Motion pictures.	
1975	Watt Matthews	For preserving Western history.	
1975	Oklahoma Today	For outstanding editorial and pictorial effort in presenting information about Oklahoma to its citizens.	
1975	Bob Wills & His Texas Playboys	For "The Last Time", an outstanding contribution to historical preservation	
1976	Spike Van Cleve	For Spike Van Cleve: An American Portrait, an outstanding short documentary reflecting the West of today.	
1976	David Hoffman	For Spike Van Cleve: An American Portrait, an outstanding short documentary reflecting the West of today.	
1976	Harry Wiland	For Spike Van Cleve: An American Portrait, an outstanding short documentary reflecting the West of today.	
1976	Gordon Bowman	For Spike Van Cleve: An American Portrait, an outstanding short documentary reflecting the West of today.	
1976	John Champion	For outstanding family entertainment in a Western motion picture (Mustang Country)	
1976	Joel McCrea	For outstanding family entertainment in a Western motion picture (Mustang Country)	
1976	Margaret Harper	For being founder and driving force of the truly Western Americana pageant, Texas.	
1976	W. L. Lawrence	For being widely recognized student, collector, and historian of the American fur trade.	
1976	George O'Brien	For outstanding career portraying the Western movie hero.	
1976	George H. Shirk	For outstanding author, lecturer, and leader in historical preservation.	
1977	Luis Ortega	For lifetime achievement	
1983	Thomas Hornsby Ferril		
1983	Luke Decatur Sweetman	For Gotch, the Story of a Cow Horse and Back Trailing on the Open Range	
1984	Ed Quigley		
1984	Carl Sherwin	For contributions to the preservation of western heritage	
1984	Harry E. Webb		
1985	Louis L'Amour		
1985	Montana Stock Growers Association		
1985	Otha Wearin	For support of the preservation of western heritage	

=== Other special awards ===
- Special Award: John B. Stetson Company for The Hat That Wore the West-Death Valley Days (1963)
- Special Award: Yakima Canutt for more than 50 years of outstanding contributions to Motion Pictures (1971)
- Special Award: Craig Fisher for the documentary film Survival on the Prairie (1971)
- Special Merit Award: Union Pacific and The Westerner in recognition of great western motion pictures made prior to 1960 (1975)
- Special Award: Seuil Audiovisual (producer) for Frontier Heritage; Claude Fleouter (writer-director); Denys Limon (writer); (1978)
- Special Award: Harold Warp, creator of pioneer village in Minden, Nebraska (1978)
- Special Award: Paul Aaron, host of Cowboy Joe's Radio Ranch and Prairie Echoes (1978)
- Special Award: Ed Rutherford, collector of Western artifacts (1980)
- Special Award: James A. Michener (author) (1980)
- John Ford Award: Sam Peckinpah (1980)
- Special Award: Alfred A. Knopf, publisher (1981)
- Special Award: John Mantley, television producer (1981)
- Special Award: Buck Taylor, actor (1981)
- Special Award: Elsa Spear Byron, author/photographer (1982)
- Special Award: Johnny Grant, entertainer (1982)
- Entertainment Arts Gold Medal: Burl Ives (1984)
- Special Award: Bill Kelly (producer) and Allison Brown (producer) for "Joe Wietsky: Cowboy" (1987)
- Special Award: Geoffrey Bell (producer) for "The Movies Go West" (1987)
- Special Award for Outstanding Achievement in a New Format: Kieth Merrill (director, producer) for "Alamo: The Price of Freedom" (IMAX Format) (1989)
- Special Award for Significant Scholarly Research: Merrill J. Mattes (editor) and University of Illinois Press (publisher) for Platte River Road Narratives (1989)
- Special Music Award: Arlene Markinson (producer) for "Santa Fe Spirit" (1990)
- Special Television Feature Award: E.W. Swackhammer (director), Chuck Sellier (producer) Alex McArthur (actor) for "Desperado" (1990)
- Lifetime Contribution to Western Art Award: Robert Lougheed, posthumanous award accepted by his widow Cordy Lougheed (1990)
- Special Award for Historical Excellence: Richard Farnsworth (narrator), Gwendolyn Clancy (producer) and the University of Nevada, Reno (producer) for "The Man They Call Will James" (1991)
- Special Award for the Preservation of Authentic Western Music: Michael Martin Murphey (composer, producer) for "Cowboy Logic" (1991)
- Directors' Award for Excellence in a Theatrical Presentation: Tommy Tune (director, choreographer), Cy Coleman (composer), Betty Comden (lyrics), Adolph Green (lyrics), Keith Carradine (actor), Pierre Cossette (producer), Martin Richards (producer), Sam Crothers (producer), James M. Nederlander (producer), Stewart Lane (producer) and Max Weitzenhoffer (producer) for "The Will Rogers Follies" (1992)
- Directors' Award for Excellence in a Television Presentation: Marino Amoruso (director, screenplay, producer), Ben Johnson (actor) and Harry Carey Jr. (actor) for "Legends of the American West" (1992)
- Directors' Award for Outstanding Study of Western Material Culture: R.L. Wilson (author) and Random House (publisher) for "The Peacemakers: Arms and Adventures in the American West" (1993)
- Directors' Award for Outstanding Contributions to Western Music: "Sons of the Pioneers" (1995)
- Outstanding Achievement in Art: Wilson Hurley following formal dedication of his five monumental "Windows to the West" triptychs (1996)
- Special Award: TNN in recognition of their leadership for providing the Hall's first national television special "A Cowboy Jubilee: Celebrating the National Cowboy Hall of Fame" in April 1995 (1996)
- Special Award for Innovation in Western Music: Michael Martin Murphey (recording artist) and Jim Ed Norman (producer) for "Sagebrush Symphony" (1996)
- Directors' Award For Special Literary Achievement: Peter H. Hassrick (author), Melissa J. Webster (author) and the Buffalo Bill Historical Center for "Frederic Remington: A Catalogue Raisonne of Paintings, Watercolors and Drawings" (1997)
- Directors' Award For Special Recognition: Frank "Pistol Pete" Eaton (1997)
- Directors Award for Excellence in Original Western Television Production: TNT (1997)
- Special Directors' Award: R.L. Wilson (author), Greg Martin (author) and Random House (publisher) (1999)
- Director's Award For Outstanding News Magazine Feature: Victor Neufeld (executive director), Rob Wallace (producer) and Hugh Downs (reporter) for ABC News 20/20: "Wild Horses" (1999)
- Special Directors Award For Special Recognition: Robert L. Klemme for marking the location of the Chisholm Trail, where it was located between the years of 1871-1874, across the state of Oklahoma (1999)
- Directors' Award for Television Feature Film: Uli Edel (director), Gordon Dawson (screenplay), Sam Shepard (actor), Randy Quaid (actor), Eric Roberts (actor), Brad Rowe (actor), David Rosemont (executive producer) and Daniel Schneider (producer) for "Purgatory" (TNT)
- Directors Award for Excellence in Dramatic Presentation and Original Music Composition: R.W. Hampton (composer), Lisa Hampton (executive producer), Rich O'Brien (producer) for "The Last Cowboy – His Journey"
- Directors' Award: Bob Brown, leather maker and costume designer to the Hollywood stars of early western films (2001)
- Special Directors' Award: Arthur Allan Seidelman (director), Jacqueline Feather (screenplay), David Seidler (screenplay), Richard Crenna (actor), David Carradine (actor), Randall C. Badger (executive producer), Dan Paulson (executive producer), Robert Halmi Jr. (executive producer), Bob Chmiel (executive producer) for By Dawn's Early Light (2001)
- Board of Directors' Lifetime Achievement Award: A.C. Lyles, producer for Paramount Pictures (2006)
- Board of Directors' Lifetime Achievement Award: Dean Smith, Hollywood stuntman, actor and gold medalist in the 1952 Olympics (2007)
