= Hilda Nanette Blanche Praeger Killby =

British geneticist

Hilda Nanette Blanche Praeger Killby (1877–1962) was a British geneticist who investigated heredity in goats and worked with William Bateson and Edith Rebecca Saunders in the early days of the study of genetics.

From 1898 to 1901, Killby studied at Newnham College, Cambridge graduating with a 2:1 honours in Part I of the Natural Sciences Tripos. At this time she was not eligible for a degree.

Over her career Killby assisted Bateson in his undertaking to reproduce of one of Mendel's original heredity experiments, performing a large number of crosses in peas. During her career she conducted independent breeding experiments in rabbits and bantam chicken.

Killby assisted both Bateson and Becky Saunders in their hybridisation experiments in the Cambridge Botanic Gardens, and worked at the John Innes Horticultural Institution during the First World War, so many ‘gardeners having gone off to make munitions'.

In 1919, Hilda Killby became one of the founding members of the Genetical Society, formed by Bateson and Saunders.

She also worked as a translator of scientific papers for research workers and between 1941 and 1945 worked at Pye Radio Ltd., Cambridge.
