= Anouk De Clercq =

Belgian artist

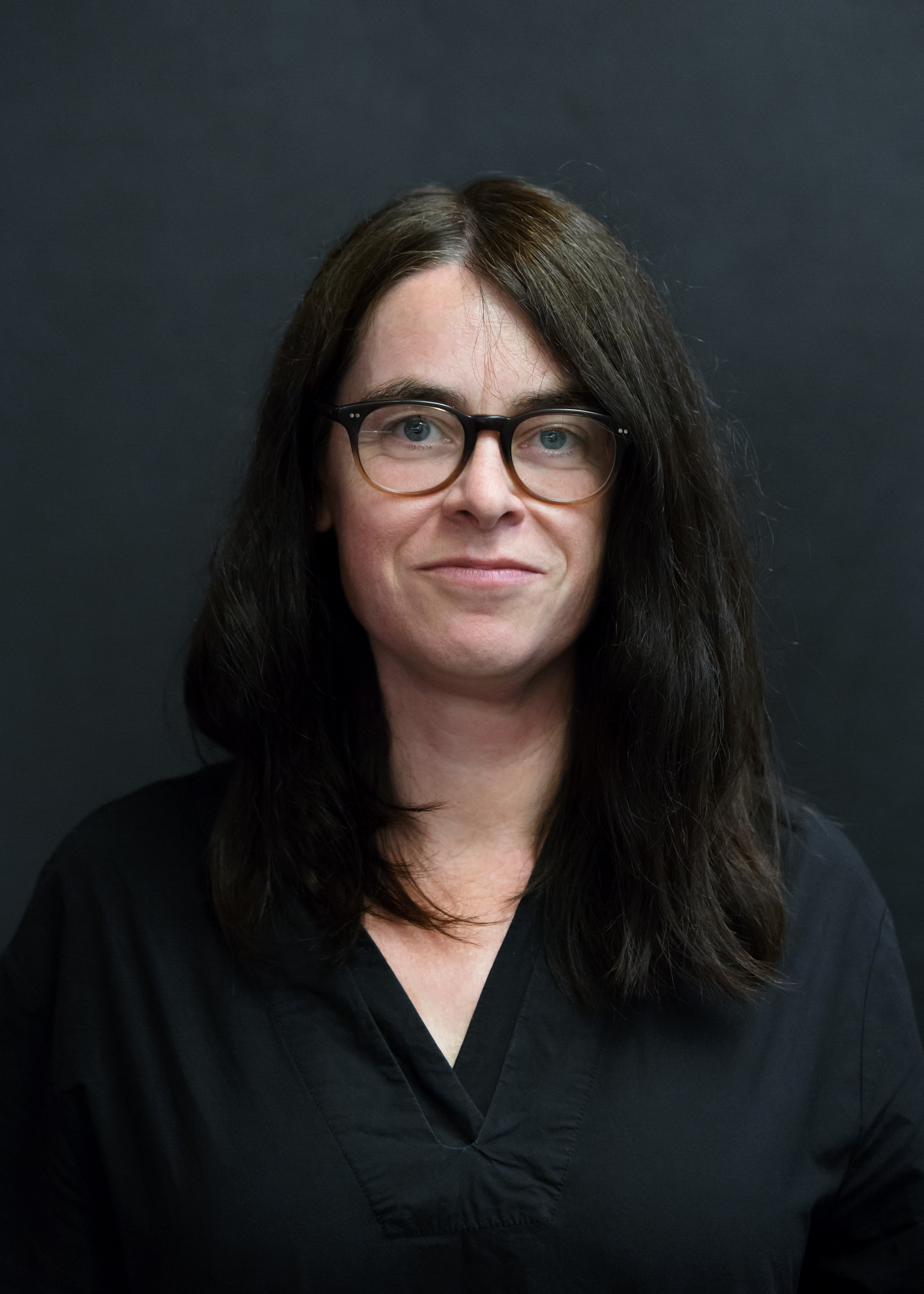
Anouk De Clercq (Vienna Independent Shorts 2016)

Anouk De Clercq (born 1971) is a Belgian multimedia artist.

Her work has been exhibited at the Tate Modern, at the Whitechapel Gallery, at the Centre Georges Pompidou, at the Museo Nacional Centro de Arte Reina Sofía, at transmediale, at Ars Electronica and at the Biennale de l’Image en Mouvement. She has received several awards, including the Illy Prize at Art Brussels in 2005 and a Prix Ars Electronica Honorary Mention in 2014.

Anouk De Clercq explores the potential of audiovisual language to create possible worlds. Her recent work is based on the utopian idea of ‘radical empathy’.

She is a founding member of Auguste Orts, On & For Production and Distribution and initiator of Monokino. She is affiliated to the School of Arts University College Ghent as a visiting professor.

Anouk De Clercq is the author of Where is Cinema, published by Archive Books.

== Filmography ==
- OK (with Helga Davis) (2021)
- We’ll Find You When The Sun Goes Black (2021)
- One (2020)
- Helga Humming (installation) (2019)
- Pendant Air (installation) (2018)
- It (2017)
- Atlas (2016)
- Black (2015)
- New York New York (with Fairuz Ghamman) (2014)
- Thing (2013)
- Swan Song (2013)
- Tears of Melancholy (2013)
- Oh (2010)
- 400Blows (2009)
- Oops Wrong Planet (2009)
- Echo (installation) (2008)
- Pixelspleen (2007)
- Pang (2005)
- Horizon (2004)
- Me+ (2004)
- Conductor (2004)
- Kernwasser Wunderland (with Joris Cool & Eavesdropper) (2004)
- Building (2003)
- Petit Palais (2002)
- Portal (2002)
- Sonar (2001)
- Whoosh (2001)
- Motion for Stockhausen (2000)
- Autobiography of the Eye (1997)
- Speakeasy (1996)

== links ==
- www.portapak.be
- www.monokino.org
- www.augusteorts.be
