= Ninette (given name) =

Ninette is a feminine given name, which originated as a French diminutive of the name Nina.

Notable people with the name include:

- Ninette Dutton (1923–2007), Australian artist, broadcaster and author
- Ninette Finch (born 1933), English actress
- Ninette de Valois (born Edris Stannus; 1898–2001), Irish-born British dancer, teacher, choreographer, and director of classical ballet
