= Anneke =

Dutch feminine given name

Anneke is a Dutch (IPA^{[key]}: /ˈɑ.nə.kə/) and Low German female diminutive given name, meaning little Anna or little Anne, i.e., Annie, an alternate pet or endearing form of Anna. The given name and later surname Anneke also Annecke is a diminutive of the male short name Anno, a variant of Arno, itself derived from Arnold. Notable persons with that name include:

== People with the given name ==
- Anneke Beerten (born 1982), Dutch mountain cyclist
- Anneke Esaiasdochter (1509–1539), Dutch Anabaptist
- Anneke van Giersbergen (born 1973), Dutch singer, songwriter, guitarist, and pianist
- Anneke von der Lippe (born 1964), Norwegian actress
- Anneke Venema (born 1971), Dutch rower
- Anneke Wills (born 1941), English actress

== People with the surname ==
- Fritz Anneke (1818–1872), German-American socialist and newspaper editor, owner, and reporter
- Mathilde Franziska Anneke (1817–1884), German-American feminist and socialist

== See also ==
- Aneke
