= Anouk Masson Krantz =

French photographer, living in the United States

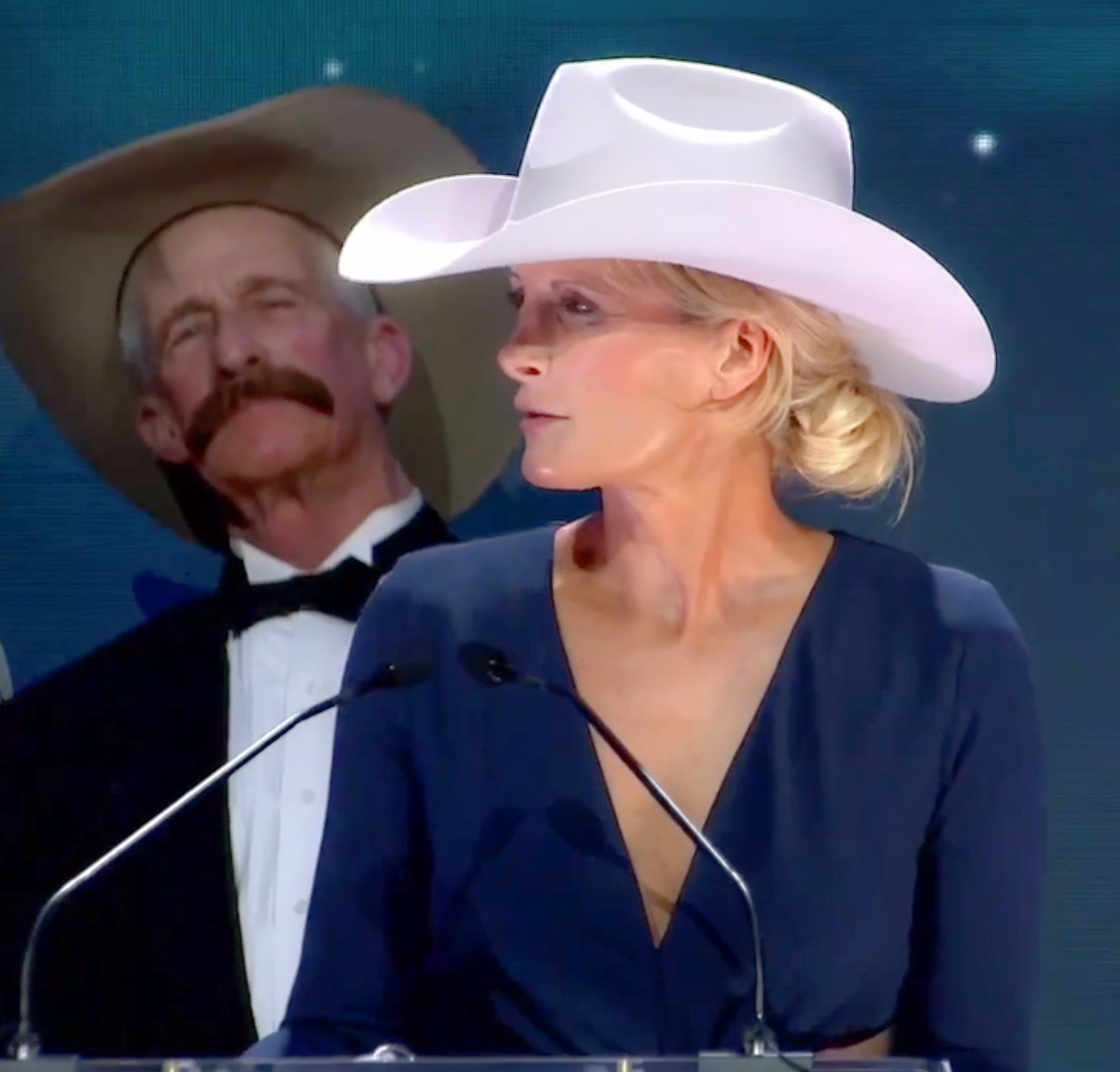

Anouk Masson Krantz is a French/Dutch fine-art photographer and author living in New York City, who has made work about cowboys, rodeo and ranching in the Western United States. She has had a solo exhibition at the National Cowboy & Western Heritage Museum in Oklahoma. In 2023, she received the Bronze Wrangler at the Western Heritage Awards.

== Early life and education ==
Krantz was born in L'Union, a suburb of Toulouse, France. Raised in France, she moved to the United States her last year of high school in the late 1990s. Living in New York City, she completed high school at the Lycée Français de New York, but then returned to France to study at the University of Paris XI and transferred after two years back to New York City where she earned a bachelor's degree. In New York she worked for lifestyle magazines and at Cartier's corporate office, and later studied at the International Center of Photography.

== Work ==
Wild Horses of Cumberland Island (2017) is about a band of feral horses living on Cumberland Island, off Georgia. The rest of Krantz's work has been about the Western United States and its cowboys, rodeo and ranching communities. American Cowboys (2021) contains a "photographic study of this often overlooked, misunderstood world, from the families immersed in the culture to the hard work and labor of ranching and rodeos."

== Publications ==
- Wild Horses of Cumberland Island. Mulgrave: Images, 2017. ISBN 9781864707427.
- West: The American Cowboy. Mulgrave: Images, 2019. ISBN 9781864708394.
- American Cowboys. Melbourne, Victoria: Images, 2021. ISBN 9781864709186. With a foreword by Taylor Sheridan.
- Ranchland: Wagonhound. Mulgrave: Images, 2022. ISBN 9781864709124. With a foreword by Gretel Ehrlich.

== Solo exhibitions ==
- West: The American Cowboy, National Cowboy & Western Heritage Museum, Oklahoma City, Oklahoma, 2020
