= Ninon (given name) =

Ninon is a French diminutive for names such as Anne that is also in use as an independent name.

== Women named Ninon ==
- Ninon Abena (born 1994), Cameroonian footballer
- Ninon Chapelle (née Guillon-Romarin; born 1995), French pole vaulter
- Ninon Colneric (born 1948), German judge
- Ninon de l'Enclos (1620–1705), French author, courtesan and patron of the arts
- Ninon Hesse (née Ausländer; 1895–1966), Ukrainian born art historian and third wife of German-Swiss poet, novelist, and painter Hermann Hesse
- Ninon Dubois Le Clerc (1750–1779), French ballerina and courtesan
- Ninon Lemarchand (born 2003), French squash player
- Ninon Romaine (1883–1930), American pianist
- Ninon Vallin (1886–1961), French lyric soprano

== Women named Ninón ==
- Ninón Lapeiretta de Brouwer (1907–1989), Dominican composer and pianist
- Ninón Sevilla (1921–2015), stage name of Cuban-Mexican actress and dancer Emelia Pérez Castellanos (1921–2015)
