= Anouk Mels =

Dutch softball player (born 1971)

Personal information
- Nationality: Dutch
- Born: 5 February 1971 (age 54); Hoorn, Netherlands

Sport
- Sport: Softball

Anouk Mels (born 5 February 1971) is a Dutch former softball player. She competed in the women's tournament at the 1996 Summer Olympics.

A left-handed pitcher, Mels played professional softball from 1988 to 1999, and made a return from 2007 to 2009. She was a four-time Dutch League MVP, and a two-time European Cup MVP, also playing for clubs in New Zealand, Japan, and Italy. Mels also made 43 appearances with the national softball team.
