= Nwagu Aneke script =

Writing system for the Umuleri dialect of Igbo

Nwagu Aneke
- Script type: Syllabary
- Period: c. 1950s - 1991
- Languages: Umuleri-Igbo

The Nwagu Aneke script is a syllabary and some logographs that was developed by Nwagu Aneke for the Umuleri dialect of Igbo in the late 1950s. Aneke, a successful land owner and diviner, claimed to have had no prior reading or writing skills, and that he was inspired by spirits who revealed the characters to him. The script does not have any vowels but is similar to other West African scripts invented in the 19th and 20th centuries, such as the Vai syllabary, because it has characters for sounds that are not in the Latin script. Aneke had written more than 100 textbooks of anti-colonial commentary works and diary entries, including The Spirits Implore Me to Record All They Have Taught Me and I Went Round the World, before his death in 1991.
