= Nanette: An Aside =

1897 short story by Willa Cather

- Short story by Willa Cather
- Country: United States
- Language: English
- Genre: Short story

Publication
- Published in: Lincoln Courier
- Publication type: Daily newspaper
- Publication date: 31 July 1897

"Nanette: An Aside" is a short story by Willa Cather. It was first published in Courier on 31 July 1897 and one month later in Home Monthly.

== Plot summary ==
As they are soon to leave America, Nanette tells Madame Traduttori she does not want to leave because she has fallen in love with Signor Luongo, who wants to marry her. He will not let her travel around the world, which she does with Madame. A little while later, Madame says she agrees to let her go on with her new life.

== Characters ==
- Nanette, Madame Tradutorri's maid. Her mother was an opera singer with Madame Traduttori when they were both younger but she wasn't successful and died in a charity hospital.
- Madame Tradutorri, an opera singer. She is gnawed by her sadness. Her husband lives in Monte Carlo and her daughter is crippled and lives in a convent in Italy.
- Signor Luongo, a head waiter.

== Allusions to other works ==
- Madame Traduttori is said to have performed Cavalleria rusticana.
- Maria Malibran is mentioned regarding Madame Traduttori's sadness.
- Madame Traduttori mentions the Capulets from William Shakespeare's Romeo and Juliet.

== Literary significance and criticism ==
Nanette: An Aside was later rewritten as A Singer's Romance, though with a different stance.

It was the first instance of the opera singer in her fiction. It was also partly based on Cather's life, as she had just written a letter to a friend about how marriage would force her to relinquish her art.
