= Ninon Romaine =

American pianist

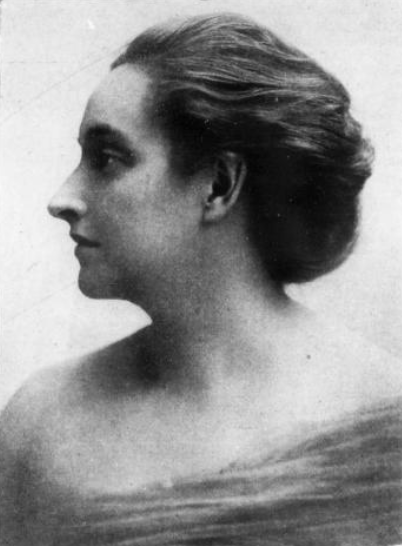
- Ninon Romaine, from a 1923 publication
- Born: Ninon Romaine Curry; March 17, 1883; Toledo, Ohio, U.S.
- Died: May 2, 1930 (aged 47); Srinagar, India
- Other names: Ninon Romaine Zimmerman
- Occupation: Pianist

Ninon Romaine Curry Zimmerman (March 17, 1883 – May 2, 1930) was an American concert pianist active in the 1920s.

== Early life and education ==
Romaine was born in Toledo, Ohio, the daughter of John Henry Curry and Mary N. Janes Curry. Her father was a physician. She studied and performed in Germany and Russia during her youth. She played at Pratt Institute in New York in 1903. She studied with Robert Teichmüller in Leipzig, and had her Berlin debut in 1907.

== Career ==
Romaine was a concert pianist. Before World War I, she was the guest of Count Zeppelin in a trip by zeppelin airship, and received jewelry gifts from Czar Nicholas and Kaiser Wilhelm. She entertained wounded men at hospitals in Europe during World War I.

In 1920 she was a soloist with the Detroit Symphony, and she gave a recital at New York's Aeolian Hall. She toured in the United States in 1923, and played in Europe in 1924 and 1925. She played at a benefit concert in 1928 with baritone Lawrence Tibbett and violinist Carolyn Le Fevre. "She brings bravura tone of such astounding volume and beauty, and again glissandi of such deft and thistledown like softness," according to a 1928 report that also mentioned her "titanic strength and gentle tenderness."

Romaine joined the faculty of the American College of Music in Toledo in 1922. She sat for portraits by several artists, including Xander Warshawsky and Richard Jack. English composer Eugene Goossens dedicated a piano composition to Romaine.

== Publications ==
- "A Sermon on Sympathy" (1924, Musical Courier)

== Personal life ==
Romaine married a German baron, manufacturer Eugene Ludwig Zimmerman, in 1910. They separated by 1921, but she was described as his widow when she died from smallpox in Srinagar, India, in 1930, at the age of 47.
