= Nannie =

Nannie is a given name. Notable people with the name include:

- Nannie Helen Burroughs, (1879–1961), African-American educator, orator, religious leader and businesswoman
- Nannie Webb Curtis (1861–1920), American lecturer, temperance activist, clubwoman
- Nannie de Villiers (born 1976), South African former tennis player
- Nannie Doss (1905–1965), American serial killer
- Nannie Lambert Power O'Donoghue (1843–1940), Irish author, poet and journalist
- Nannie Kelly Wright (1856–1946), born Nannie Scott Honshell, the only known American female ironmaster
- Nannie Brown, nickname of Agnes Brown (suffragist)
- Nannie, a witch in Robert Burn's poem "Tam o' Shanter"

== See also ==
- Nannie Helen Burroughs School, a private coeducational elementary school in the District of Columbia
- Nannie Lee House (a.k.a. Strawberry Mansion), a historic U.S. home in Melbourne, Florida
- Alternative spelling of Nanny
