= Nance (disambiguation) =

The nance (Byrsonima crassifolia) is a fruit-bearing tree native to the tropical regions of North and South America.

Nance may also refer to:

== Places ==
- Nance, Jura, France
- Nance, Missouri, United States
- Nance County, Nebraska, United States

== People ==
- Nance (surname)
- Nancy Coolen, singer for the Dutch Eurodance act Twenty 4 Seven

== Arts, entertainment, and media ==
- Nance (film), a 1920 British silent film directed by Albert Ward
- The Nance, a play by Douglas Carter Beane

== Botany ==
- Nance, fruit of other trees in the genus Byrsonima
- Nance, the legume Pseudalbizzia pistaciifolia

== See also ==
- Nanci
- Nancey (disambiguation)
- Nancy (disambiguation)
- Mance (disambiguation)
