= Nancey =

Nancey is a surname and a given name.

== People with given name ==
- Nancey Harrington, U.S. politician
- Nancey Jackson Johnson (born 1968), U.S. musician
- Nancey Murphy (born 1951), U.S. philosopher
- Nancey Silvers, U.S. screenwriter and sister of Cathy Silvers

== People with surname ==
- Marcel Nancey, French journalist and dramatist
- Nicolas Nancey (1874–1925), French dramatist

== See also ==
- Nance (disambiguation)
- Nanci, a given name
- Nancy (disambiguation)
- Mancey
