= Jeanne Mance (disambiguation) =

Jeanne Mance (1606–1673), a French nurse who was a founding figure of New France and Montreal, Quebec, Canada

Jeanne Mance may also refer to:

== Places ==
- Jeanne-Mance, a district of Plateau-Mont-Royal, Montreal, Quebec, Canada
- Jeanne-Mance Street, in Downtown Montreal, Montreal, Quebec, Canada
- Jeanne-Mance Park, in Plateau-Mont-Royal, Montreal, Quebec, Canada
- Jeanne Mance Monument, at Hotel-Dieu Hospital in Plateau-Mont-Royal, Montreal, Quebec, Canada
- Habitations Jeanne-Mance, an "urban project" in Ville-Marie, Montreal, Quebec, Canada
- Jeanne-Mance (provincial electoral district), a former riding

== Other uses ==
- Jeanne-Mance Delisle (born 1941), a Canadian writer

== See also ==
- Jeanne (disambiguation)
- Mance (disambiguation)
- Montréal–Jeanne-Mance, a former provincial electoral district
- Jeanne-Mance–Viger, a provincial electoral district
