= Mancy =

Mancy may refer to:

- Divination
- Mancy, Marne, a commune in France
- Mancy, Moselle, a hamlet in France

== See also ==
- Mance (disambiguation)
- Mancey
