= Mance (surname) =

Mance is a surname. Notable people with the surname include:

- Antonio Mance, Croatian footballer
- Charlie Mance, Australian soldier
- Dragan Mance, Yugoslav footballer
- Henry Christopher Mance (1840–1926), inventor of the Mance heliograph
- Henry Osborne Mance (1875–1960), British Brigadier-General, son of the above
- Jeanne Mance (1606–1673), founder of Montreal
- Jonathan Mance, Baron Mance, British jurist
- Joshua Mance, American sprinter
- Junior Mance, American jazz pianist and composer
- Mary Arden, Lady Arden of Heswall, Baroness Mance, wife of Jonathan

== See also ==
- Mance (disambiguation)
