= Nancy Jackson =

Nancy Jackson may refer to:

- Nancy Jackson (climber) (1956–1990), American mountain climber
- Nancy B. Jackson (1956–2022), American chemist
- Nancey Jackson Johnson (born 1968), American gospel musician
