= Nenci =

Nenci is an Italian surname. Notable people with the surname include:

- Francesco Nenci (1781–1850), Italian painter
- Franco Nenci (1935–2020), Italian boxer

== See also ==
- Nanci
