= Briey =

Commune in Meurthe-et-Moselle, France

- Part of Val de Briey
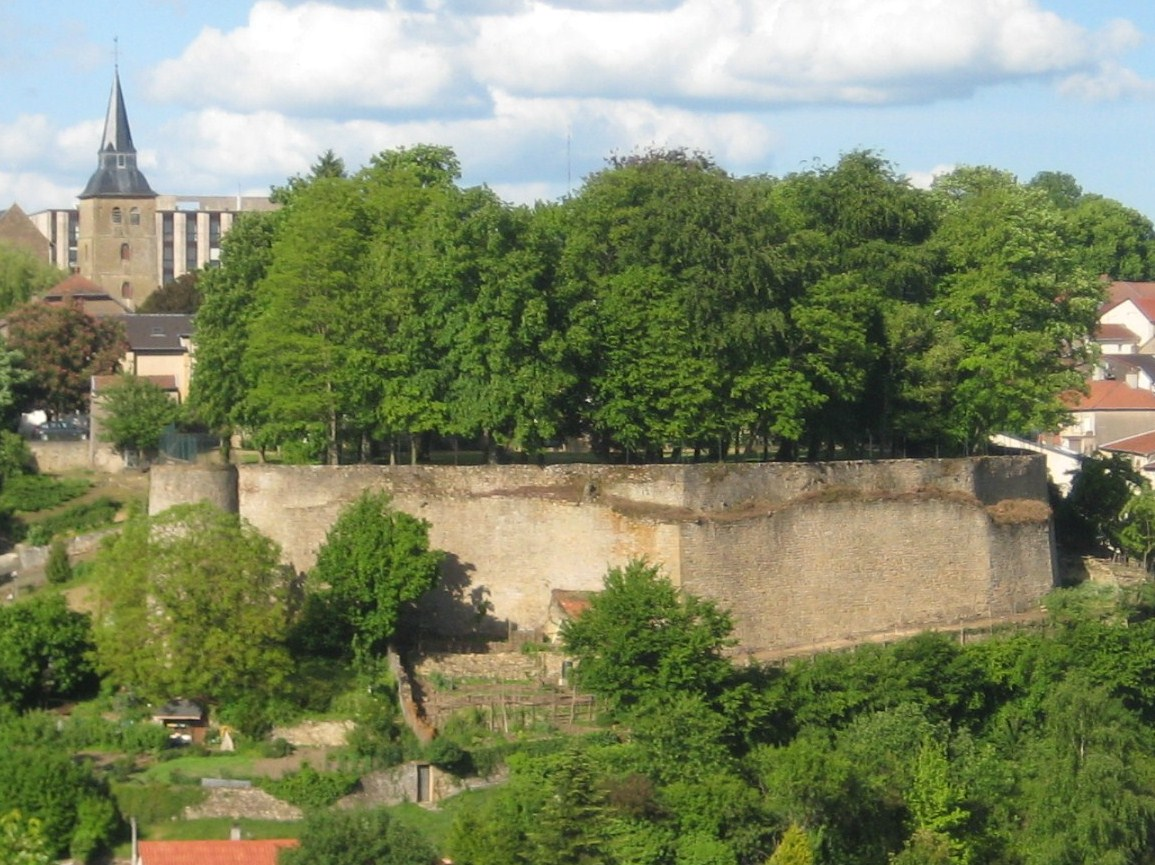

- Coat of arms
- Location of Briey
- Location within France Location within Grand Est
- Coordinates: 49°14′58″N 5°56′25″E
- Country: France
- Region: Grand Est
- Department: Meurthe-et-Moselle
- Arrondissement: Briey
- Canton: Pays de Briey
- Commune: Val de Briey
- Area^{1}: 27.13 km^{2} (10.47 sq mi)
- Elevation: 240 m (790 ft)
- Highest elevation: 300 m (980 ft)
- Lowest elevation: 200 m (660 ft)
- Population (2022): 5,511
  - Density: 203.1/km^{2} (526.1/sq mi)
- Time zone: UTC+01:00 (CET)
  - Summer (DST): UTC+02:00 (CEST)
- Postal code: 54150
- ^{1} French Land Register data, which excludes lakes, ponds, glaciers > 1 km^{2} (0.386 sq mi or 247 acres) and river estuaries.

Briey (French pronunciation: [bʁijɛ]; German: Brietz) is a former commune in the Meurthe-et-Moselle department in northeastern France. On 1 January 2017, it was merged into the new commune Val de Briey.

It is located both above and in a steep section of the valley of the river Woigot, five kilometers to the north of the autoroute that connects Strasbourg with Paris, and 22 km northwest of Metz. The population of the town itself has been around 5,000 since the 1960s.

== Geography ==
Briey forms a part of an extensive grouping of once heavily industrialized towns that also includes Jœuf and Homécourt, along with Hagondange, Amnéville and Rombas in the adjacent department.

The town is arranged into four principal quarters, and traversed by the Woigot (itself a tributary of the Orne). North of the river, Briey-Haut (Upper Briey), the area centred on the former medieval citadel, stretches out towards the villages of Mance and Moutier, and overhangs Briey-Bas (Lower Briey), which occupies the banks of the Woigot. The steeply angled "grand-rue" ("Main Street") connects the two areas of the town, which elsewhere are separated by a cliff-face garden. South of the valley is Briey-les-Hauts, another "high town", facing the villages of Lantéfontaine and Valleroy. Beyond Briey-Haut, the fourth quarter is Briey-en-Forêt, a 1960s development dominated by Le Corbusier's "Cité Radieuse", a substantial apartment block, which displays an architectural assertiveness characteristic of its time: the Cité Radieuse has frequently struggled to attract residents, triggering aesthetic and political controversy since first it emerged from the surrounding woodland.

== History ==
The name "Briey" comes from the Celtic word "Briga", which denotes a fortress. There is a record of the Counts of Bar having held a castle here in 1072. Briey received town privileges in 1263. The turbulent years following the Black Death and the resulting sudden shifts in economic power were marked by an upsurge of violence across the region, and in 1369 Briey was burned out by a force from nearby Metz.

The increasing fragility of the Duchy of Burgundy (with was finally absorbed into France following the 1477 Battle of Nancy) created areas of political uncertainty on both sides of the Rhine and ushered in several centuries of warfare which tended, at least until the Battle of Sedan (1871), to involve France on one side and various neighboring countries on the other, whose leaders did not wish France to expand. Briey found itself captured by Charles the Bold in 1475, ravaged by Protestants in 1591, and captured by a Swedish army in 1635. The relative strength of the natural defensive position of the old citadel preserved Briey from yet more frequent devastations, but it was nonetheless reportedly occupied briefly by a Russian army during the final days of the Napoleonic Wars in 1815.

In 1801 Briey became a sub-prefecture in the Moselle department. However, after the Franco-Prussian War most of the Moselle department became part of the German Empire's territory of Alsace-Lorraine under the terms of the Treaty of Frankfurt. The former French department ceased to exist and its residuum, including Briey, was integrated into a new department of Meurthe-et-Moselle. When Lorraine was recovered by France in 1919 it was decided not to return Briey to its former department. Thus in terms of departmental boundaries, the town remains administratively separated from the eastern portion of the Briey Basin.

== Population ==
Historical population

Year	Pop.	±% p.a.
1793	1,802	—
1800	1,403	−3.51%
1806	1,784	+4.09%
1821	1,627	−0.61%
1836	1,730	+0.41%
1841	1,938	+2.30%
1861	1,886	−0.14%
1866	1,876	−0.11%
1872	1,996	+1.04%
1876	2,139	+1.74%
1881	2,131	−0.07%
1886	2,143	+0.11%
1891	2,033	−1.05%
1896	2,001	−0.32%
1901	2,226	+2.15%
1906	2,630	+3.39%

Year	Pop.	±% p.a.
1911	2,894	+1.93%
1921	2,686	−0.74%
1926	2,666	−0.15%
1931	2,804	+1.01%
1936	2,779	−0.18%
1946	2,909	+0.46%
1954	3,443	+2.13%
1962	5,391	+5.76%
1968	4,966	−1.36%
1975	5,352	+1.08%
1982	4,357	−2.90%
1990	4,514	+0.44%
1999	4,858	+0.82%
2007	5,220	+0.90%
2012	5,757	+1.98%
2022	5,511	−0.44%

Source: EHESS/Cassini until 1999 then INSEE from 2007

== Economy ==
At the beginning of the twentieth century, the Briey Basin was one of Europe’s leading steel producing regions: in the 1970s the Hagondange-Briey agglomeration still had a population of above 130,000, although by 1990 this figure had fallen to 112,000.

Intensive heavy industry is now a receding memory, as the service sector has provided the principal sources of employment growth in recent years, with increasing numbers of the working-age residents commuting to nearby Metz or Luxembourg.

== See also ==
- Communes of the Meurthe-et-Moselle department
