= List of subprefectures of France =

The subprefectures of France are the chefs-lieux of arrondissements other than those administered by a prefecture. There are 233 subprefectures out of a total of 332 arrondissements.

The list below shows the sub-prefectures by department.

== List of subprefectures ==
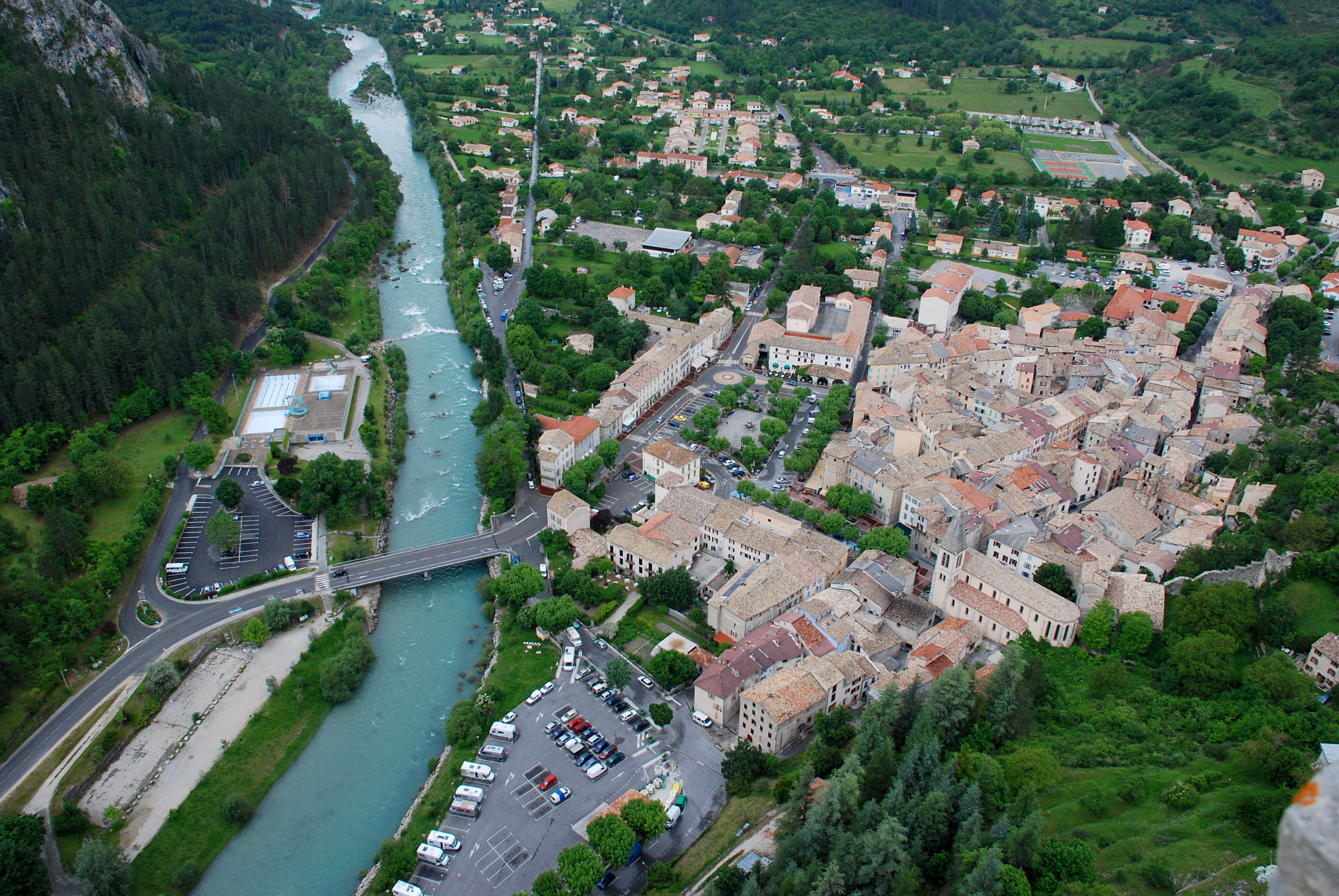
Castellane (Alpes-de-Haute-Provence), with 1,541 inhabitants, is the least populated subprefecture in France.

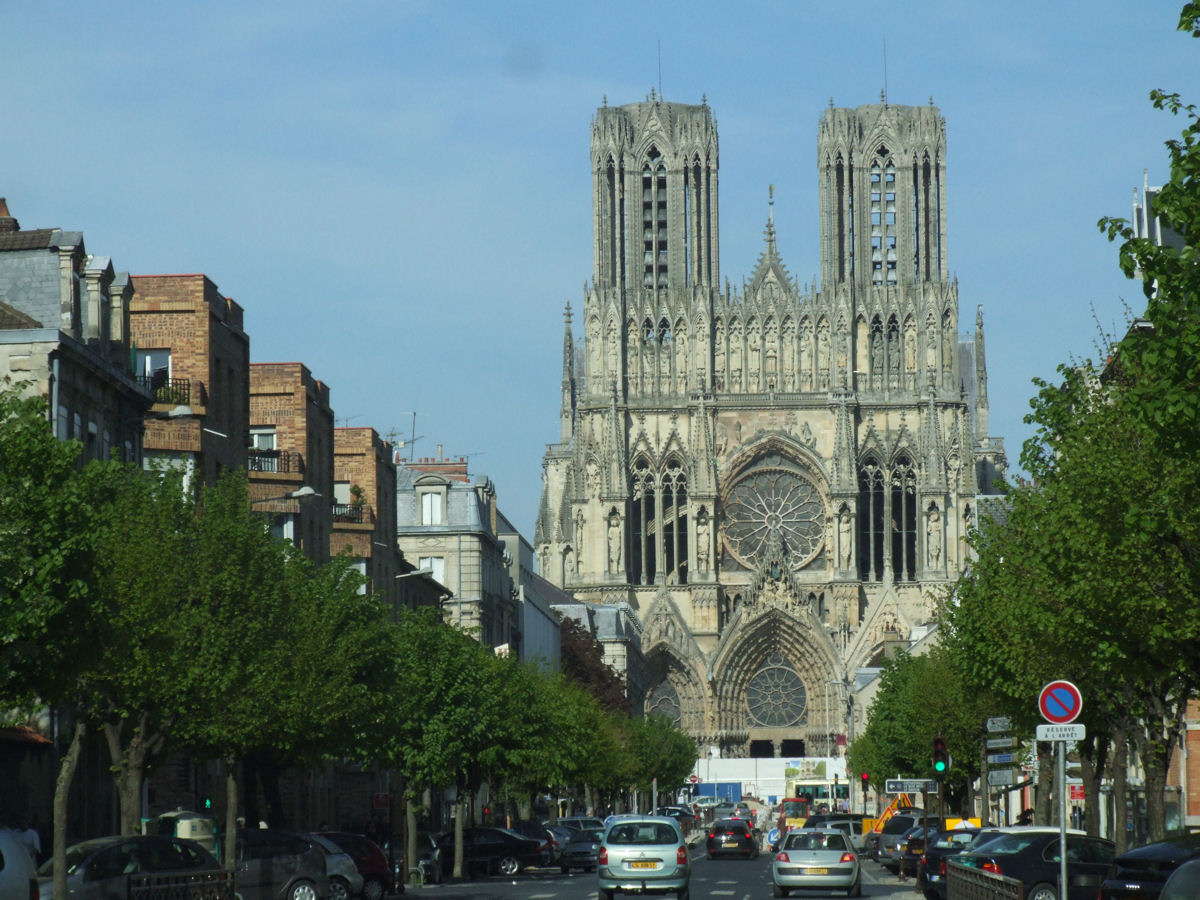
Reims (Marne), with 183,042 inhabitants, is the most populated subprefecture in France.

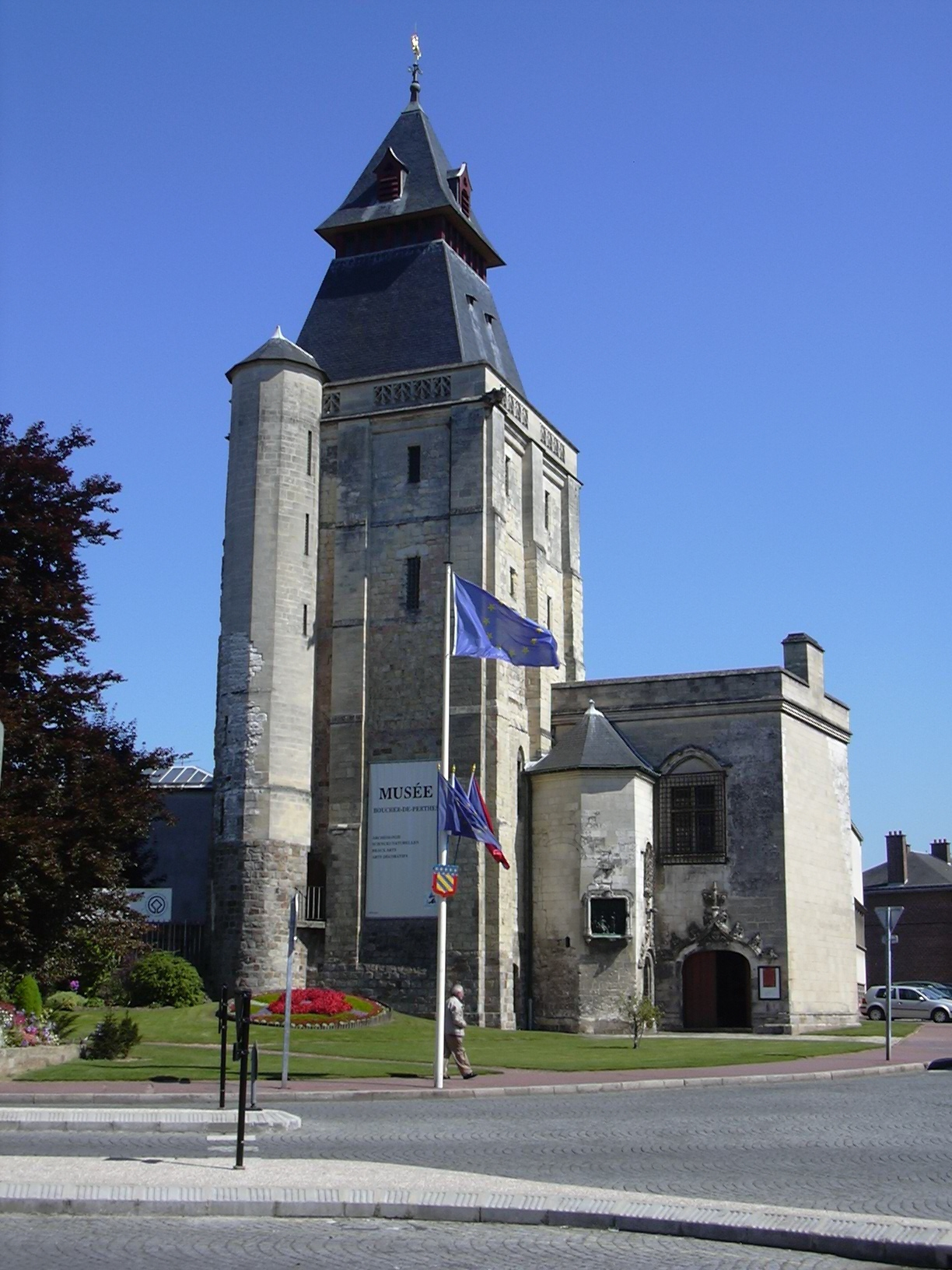
Abbeville (Somme), with 23,559 inhabitants, is the closest to the average population of French subprefectures(23,455 inhabitants).

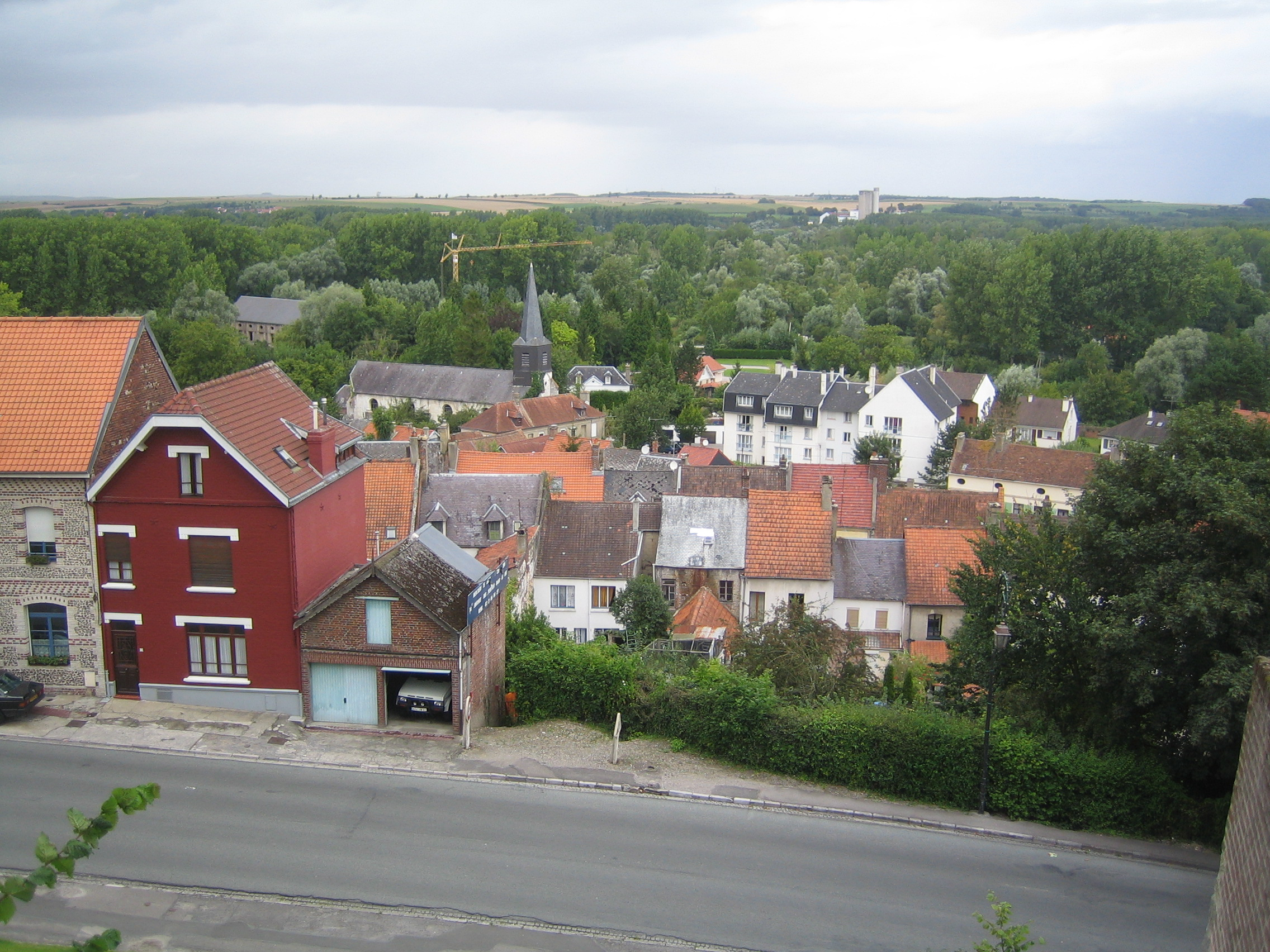
With 2,132 inhabitants, Montreuil (Pas-de-Calais) is only the 145th largest of communes in the department, which constitutes the record for a subprefecture in France.

INSEE No.	Department	Subprefecture	Population (2014)	Rank (Note: Rank, by population, of the commune at the departmental level.)
01	Ain	Belley	8,983	10
01	Ain	Gex	11,141	5
01	Ain	Nantua	3,534	33
02	Aisne	Château-Thierry	14,546	4
02	Aisne	Saint-Quentin	55,878	1
02	Aisne	Soissons	28,290	2
02	Aisne	Vervins	2,501	24
03	Allier	Montluçon	37,289	1
03	Allier	Vichy	25,279	2
04	Alpes-de-Haute-Provence	Barcelonnette	2,698	14
04	Alpes-de-Haute-Provence	Castellane	1,541	20
04	Alpes-de-Haute-Provence	Forcalquier	4,910	6
05	Hautes-Alpes	Briançon	12,392	2
06	Alpes-Maritimes	Grasse	50,409	4
07	Ardèche	Largentière	1,734	43
07	Ardèche	Tournon-sur-Rhône	10,558	4
08	Ardennes	Rethel	7,778	3
08	Ardennes	Sedan	17,829	2
08	Ardennes	Vouziers (Note: The municipal populations were established on the basis of the most recent vintage, but taking into account the new perimeter of the commune on 1 January 2017.)	4,437	8
09	Ariège	Pamiers	15,518	1
09	Ariège	Saint-Girons	6,284	3
10	Aube	Bar-sur-Aube	5,014	8
10	Aube	Nogent-sur-Seine	5,955	7
11	Aude	Limoux	10,275	5
11	Aude	Narbonne	52,855	1
12	Aveyron	Millau	22,064	2
12	Aveyron	Villefranche-de-Rouergue	11,822	4
13	Bouches-du-Rhône	Aix-en-Provence	142,149	2
13	Bouches-du-Rhône	Arles	52,697	3
13	Bouches-du-Rhône	Istres	43,463	7
14	Calvados	Bayeux	13,917	5
14	Calvados	Lisieux	20,881	3
14	Calvados	Vire-Normandie	17,839	4
15	Cantal	Mauriac	3,682	5
15	Cantal	Saint-Flour	6,643	2
16	Charente	Cognac	18,717	2
16	Charente	Confolens	2,728	22
17	Charente-Maritime	Jonzac	3,447	33
17	Charente-Maritime	Rochefort	24,300	3
17	Charente-Maritime	Saintes	25,149	2
17	Charente-Maritime	Saint-Jean-d'Angély	7,123	10
18	Cher	Saint-Amand-Montrond	10,161	3
18	Cher	Vierzon	27,050	2
19	Corrèze	Brive-la-Gaillarde	46,961	1
19	Corrèze	Ussel	9,772	3
2A	Corse-du-Sud	Sartène	3,363	5
2B	Haute-Corse	Calvi	5,330	6
2B	Haute-Corse	Corte	7,355	4
21	Côte-d'Or	Beaune	21,579	2
21	Côte-d'Or	Montbard	5,350	14
22	Côtes-d'Armor	Dinan	10,919	6
22	Côtes-d'Armor	Guingamp	7,003	12
22	Côtes-d'Armor	Lannion	19,869	2
23	Creuse	Aubusson	3,591	3
24	Dordogne	Bergerac	27,764	2
24	Dordogne	Nontron	3,151	14
24	Dordogne	Sarlat-la-Canéda	9,127	4
25	Doubs	Montbéliard	25,521	2
25	Doubs	Pontarlier	17,413	3
26	Drôme	Die	4,516	20
26	Drôme	Nyons	6,641	12
27	Eure	Bernay	10,435	6
27	Eure	Les Andelys	8,186	8
28	Eure-et-Loir	Châteaudun	13,264	4
28	Eure-et-Loir	Dreux	31,191	2
28	Eure-et-Loir	Nogent-le-Rotrou	10,130	7
29	Finistère	Brest	139,384	1
29	Finistère	Châteaulin	5,173	35
29	Finistère	Morlaix	14,837	5
30	Gard	Alès	39,993	2
30	Gard	Le Vigan	3,933	40
31	Haute-Garonne	Muret	24,975	4
31	Haute-Garonne	Saint-Gaudens	11,255	14
32	Gers	Condom	6,835	3
32	Gers	Mirande	3,527	7
33	Gironde	Arcachon	10,370	24
33	Gironde	Blaye	4,769	54
33	Gironde	Langon	7,396	36
33	Gironde	Lesparre-Médoc	5,604	47
33	Gironde	Libourne	24,595	10
34	Hérault	Béziers	75,701	2
34	Hérault	Lodève	7,381	22
35	Ille-et-Vilaine	Fougères	20,189	3
35	Ille-et-Vilaine	Redon	8,921	13
35	Ille-et-Vilaine	Saint-Malo	45,980	2
36	Indre	Issoudun	12,270	2
36	Indre	La Châtre	4,278	8
36	Indre	Le Blanc	6,602	4
37	Indre-et-Loire	Chinon	8,073	11
37	Indre-et-Loire	Loches	6,321	14
38	Isère	La Tour-du-Pin	7,934	23
38	Isère	Vienne	29,096	4
39	Jura	Dole	23,312	1
39	Jura	Saint-Claude	10,096	3
40	Landes	Dax	20,485	2
41	Loir-et-Cher	Romorantin-Lanthenay	17,459	2
41	Loir-et-Cher	Vendôme	16,879	3
42	Loire	Montbrison	15,689	5
42	Loire	Roanne	35,200	2
43	Haute-Loire	Brioude	6,700	4
43	Haute-Loire	Yssingeaux	7,105	3
44	Loire-Atlantique (Note: The decree 2016-1959 of 29 December 2016 saw the abolition of the arrondissement of Ancenis merged with that of Châteaubriant starting from 1 January 2017.)	Châteaubriant	11,895	17
44	Loire-Atlantique	Saint-Nazaire	69,350	2
45	Loiret	Montargis	13,997	8
45	Loiret	Pithiviers	9,054	12
46	Lot	Figeac	9,820	2
46	Lot	Gourdon	4,297	3
47	Lot-et-Garonne	Marmande	17,748	3
47	Lot-et-Garonne	Nérac	7,085	6
47	Lot-et-Garonne	Villeneuve-sur-Lot	23,263	2
48	Lozère	Florac-Trois-Rivières	2,107	7
49	Maine-et-Loire	Cholet	53,853	2
49	Maine-et-Loire	Saumur	27,301	3
49	Maine-et-Loire	Segré-en-Anjou Bleu	17,580	8
50	Manche	Avranches	7,813	5
50	Manche	Cherbourg-en-Cotentin	80,959	1
50	Manche	Coutances	8,789	4
51	Marne (Note: The decree 2017-453 of 29 March 2017 saw the abolition of the arrondissement of Sainte-Menehould starting from 1 April 2017.)	Épernay	23,176	3
51	Marne	Reims	183,042	1
51	Marne	Vitry-le-François	13,144	4
52	Haute-Marne	Langres	7,850	3
52	Haute-Marne	Saint-Dizier	25,505	1
53	Mayenne	Château-Gontier	11,528	3
53	Mayenne	Mayenne	13,139	2
54	Meurthe-et-Moselle	Lunéville	19,325	3
54	Meurthe-et-Moselle	Toul	15,966	4
54	Meurthe-et-Moselle	Val de Briey	8,210	17
55	Meuse	Commercy	5,914	3
55	Meuse	Verdun	18,393	1
56	Morbihan	Lorient	57,662	1
56	Morbihan	Pontivy	13,965	6
57	Moselle (Note: The decree 2014-1721 of 29 December 2014 saw the abolition of the arrondissement of Boulay-Moselle merged with that of Forbach starting from 1 January 2015, and of the arrondissement of Château-Salins merged with that of Sarrebourg starting from 1 January 2016.)	Forbach	21,740	3
57	Moselle	Sarrebourg	12,363	14
57	Moselle	Sarreguemines	21,457	5
57	Moselle	Thionville	41,083	2
58	Nièvre	Château-Chinon (Ville)	2,084	16
58	Nièvre	Clamecy	3,889	7
58	Nièvre	Cosne-Cours-sur-Loire	10,553	2
59	Nord	Avesnes-sur-Helpe	4,662	116
59	Nord	Cambrai	32,897	10
59	Nord	Douai	40,736	8
59	Nord	Dunkirk	89,160	4
59	Nord	Valenciennes	43,787	6
60	Oise	Clermont	10,502	12
60	Oise	Compiègne	40,732	2
60	Oise	Senlis	15,292	5
61	Orne	Argentan	13,968	3
61	Orne	Mortagne-au-Perche	3,994	10
62	Pas-de-Calais	Béthune	25,413	7
62	Pas-de-Calais	Boulogne-sur-Mer	42,476	2
62	Pas-de-Calais	Calais	76,402	1
62	Pas-de-Calais	Lens	31,398	5
62	Pas-de-Calais	Montreuil	2,132	145
62	Pas-de-Calais	Saint-Omer	14,164	12
63	Puy-de-Dôme	Ambert	6,794	14
63	Puy-de-Dôme	Issoire	14,578	5
63	Puy-de-Dôme	Riom	18,749	3
63	Puy-de-Dôme	Thiers	11,588	6
64	Pyrénées-Atlantiques	Bayonne	48,178	2
64	Pyrénées-Atlantiques	Oloron-Sainte-Marie	10,824	9
65	Hautes-Pyrénées	Argelès-Gazost	3,020	13
65	Hautes-Pyrénées	Bagnères-de-Bigorre	7,602	4
66	Pyrénées-Orientales	Céret	7,663	11
66	Pyrénées-Orientales	Prades	5,927	16
67	Bas-Rhin (Note: The decree 2014-1722 of 29 December 2014 saw the abolition of the arrondissement of Wissembourg merged with that of Haguenau starting from 1 January 2015.)	Haguenau	34,761	2
67	Bas-Rhin	Molsheim	9,263	15
67	Bas-Rhin	Saverne	11,433	10
67	Bas-Rhin	Sélestat	19,546	5
68	Haut-Rhin (Note: The decree 2014-1720 of 29 December 2014 saw the abolition of the arrondissements of Guebwiller merged with that of Thann, and of Ribeauvillé merged with that of Colmar, starting from 1 January 2015.)	Altkirch	5,738	20
68	Haut-Rhin	Mulhouse	111,167	1
68	Haut-Rhin	Thann	7,915	13
69	Rhône	Villefranche-sur-Saône	36,559	8
70	Haute-Saône	Lure	8,324	3
71	Saône-et-Loire	Autun	13,955	5
71	Saône-et-Loire	Chalon-sur-Saône	44,985	1
71	Saône-et-Loire	Charolles	2,757	30
71	Saône-et-Loire	Louhans	6,349	13
72	Sarthe	La Flèche	15,025	2
72	Sarthe	Mamers	5,333	8
73	Savoie	Albertville	18,950	3
73	Savoie	Saint-Jean-de-Maurienne	7,889	6
74	Haute-Savoie	Bonneville	12,575	11
74	Haute-Savoie	Saint-Julien-en-Genevois	13,253	10
74	Haute-Savoie	Thonon-les-Bains	34,973	2
75	Paris	no subprefecture		
76	Seine-Maritime	Dieppe	30,086	3
76	Seine-Maritime	Le Havre	172,807	1
77	Seine-et-Marne	Fontainebleau	14,637	22
77	Seine-et-Marne	Meaux	53,526	2
77	Seine-et-Marne	Provins	11,736	30
77	Seine-et-Marne	Torcy	23,609	9
78	Yvelines	Mantes-la-Jolie	44,985	3
78	Yvelines	Rambouillet	25,755	16
78	Yvelines	Saint-Germain-en-Laye	39,540	4
79	Deux-Sèvres	Bressuire	19,300	2
79	Deux-Sèvres	Parthenay	10,367	3
80	Somme	Abbeville	23,559	2
80	Somme	Montdidier	6,195	7
80	Somme	Péronne	7,676	4
81	Tarn	Castres	41,382	2
82	Tarn-et-Garonne	Castelsarrasin	13,765	2
83	Var	Brignoles	16,690	11
83	Var	Draguignan	40,054	5
84	Vaucluse	Apt	11,885	11
84	Vaucluse	Carpentras	28,447	3
85	Vendée	Fontenay-le-Comte	13,609	7
85	Vendée	Les Sables-d'Olonne	14,376	5
86	Vienne	Châtellerault	31,722	2
86	Vienne	Montmorillon	6,155	7
87	Haute-Vienne	Bellac	4,117	15
87	Haute-Vienne	Rochechouart	3,798	16
88	Vosges	Neufchâteau	6,577	7
88	Vosges	Saint-Dié-des-Vosges	20,315	2
89	Yonne	Avallon	7,025	4
89	Yonne	Sens	25,507	2
90	Territoire de Belfort	no subprefecture		
91	Essonne	Étampes	24,503	16
91	Essonne	Palaiseau	32,461	6
92	Hauts-de-Seine	Antony	61,603	10
92	Hauts-de-Seine	Boulogne-Billancourt	116,927	1
93	Seine-Saint-Denis	Le Raincy	14,400	34
93	Seine-Saint-Denis	Saint-Denis	110,733	1
94	Val-de-Marne	L'Haÿ-les-Roses	30,772	16
94	Val-de-Marne	Nogent-sur-Marne	31,292	14
95	Val-d'Oise	Argenteuil	108,865	1
95	Val-d'Oise	Pontoise	29,766	7
95	Val-d'Oise	Sarcelles	56,828	3
971	Guadeloupe	Pointe-à-Pitre	16,261	10
972	Martinique	La Trinité	12,973	9
972	Martinique	Le Marin	8,883	16
972	Martinique	Saint-Pierre	4,229	23
973	Guyane	Saint-Laurent-du-Maroni	44,169	2
974	Réunion	Saint-Benoît	37,738	7
974	Réunion	Saint-Paul	104,634	2
974	Réunion	Saint-Pierre	81,583	3
976	Mayotte	no subprefecture		

== See also ==
- List of arrondissements of France
