= Nancy =

Nancy may refer to:

== Places ==
=== France ===
- Nancy, France, a city in the northeastern French department of Meurthe-et-Moselle and formerly the capital of the duchy of Lorraine
  - Arrondissement of Nancy, surrounding and including the city of Nancy
  - Roman Catholic Diocese of Nancy, surrounding and including the city of Nancy
  - École de Nancy, the spearhead of the Art Nouveau in France
  - Musée de l'École de Nancy, a museum
- Nancy-sur-Cluses, Haute-Savoie

=== United States ===
- Nancy, Kentucky
- Nancy, Texas
- Nancy, Virginia
- Mount Nancy, in the White Mountains of New Hampshire

== People ==
- Nancy (given name), including a list of people and fictional characters with the name
- Nancy (singer) (Nancy Jewel McDonie; born 2000), member of Momoland
- Nancy Ajram, Lebanese singer and businesswoman, commonly known mononymously as "Nancy" in the Arab World
- Jean-Luc Nancy (1940–2021), French philosopher
- Nazmun Munira Nancy, Bangladeshi singer
- Wilfried Nancy, French football coach

== Entertainment ==
- Nancy (Nancy Sinatra album), 1969
- Nancy (Nancy Wilson album), 1969
- "Nancy (with the Laughing Face)", a song written by Jimmy Van Heusen and Phil Silvers
- "Nancy", a song by Stan Rogers from the 1984 album From Fresh Water
- Nancy (comic strip), an American comic strip whose title character debuted in 1933
- Nancy (1922), a film based on Oliver Twist with Ivan Berlyn and Sybil Thorndike
- Nancy (film), a 2018 American film
- Nancy (TV series), an American television comedy about the daughter of a United States President
- Nancy (podcast), a 2017 LGBTQ+ podcast

== Vessels ==
- Nancy (1774 EIC ship), a British East India Company ship
- Nancy (1775), an American brig destroyed in the Battle of Turtle Gut Inlet
- Nancy (1788 ship), a British merchant ship captured by the French in 1794
- Nancy (1789 ship), a schooner destroyed in the Anglo-American War of 1812
- Nancy (1803 ship), a sloop wrecked near Jervis Bay in 1805
- Nancy (1792 ship), a British East India Company ship captured and destroyed by the French in 1805
- HMS Nancy, three ships of the British Royal Navy

== Other uses ==
- Nancy (locomotive), a preserved 1908 British 0-6-0T locomotive
- The Nancy, a pub in Burton Pidsea, in England
- Nancy, a pejorative term for a gay man
- Nancy, a lightweight web framework inspired by Sinatra
- Nancy's Probiotic Foods, American food brand
- Tropical Storm Nancy (disambiguation)
- Upshot-Knothole Nancy, code name of a 1953 experimental nuclear explosion in the Operation Upshot–Knothole series
- "The Nancy", a song by Stan Rogers from the 1984 album: From Fresh Water
- Nancy Grace Roman Space Telescope a infrared space telescope launched 30 August 2026

== See also ==
- AS Nancy Lorraine, French association football club
- SLUC Nancy Basket, a French basketball club
- Nanci
- Nance (disambiguation)
- Nancey (disambiguation)
