= Mancieulles =

- Part of Val de Briey
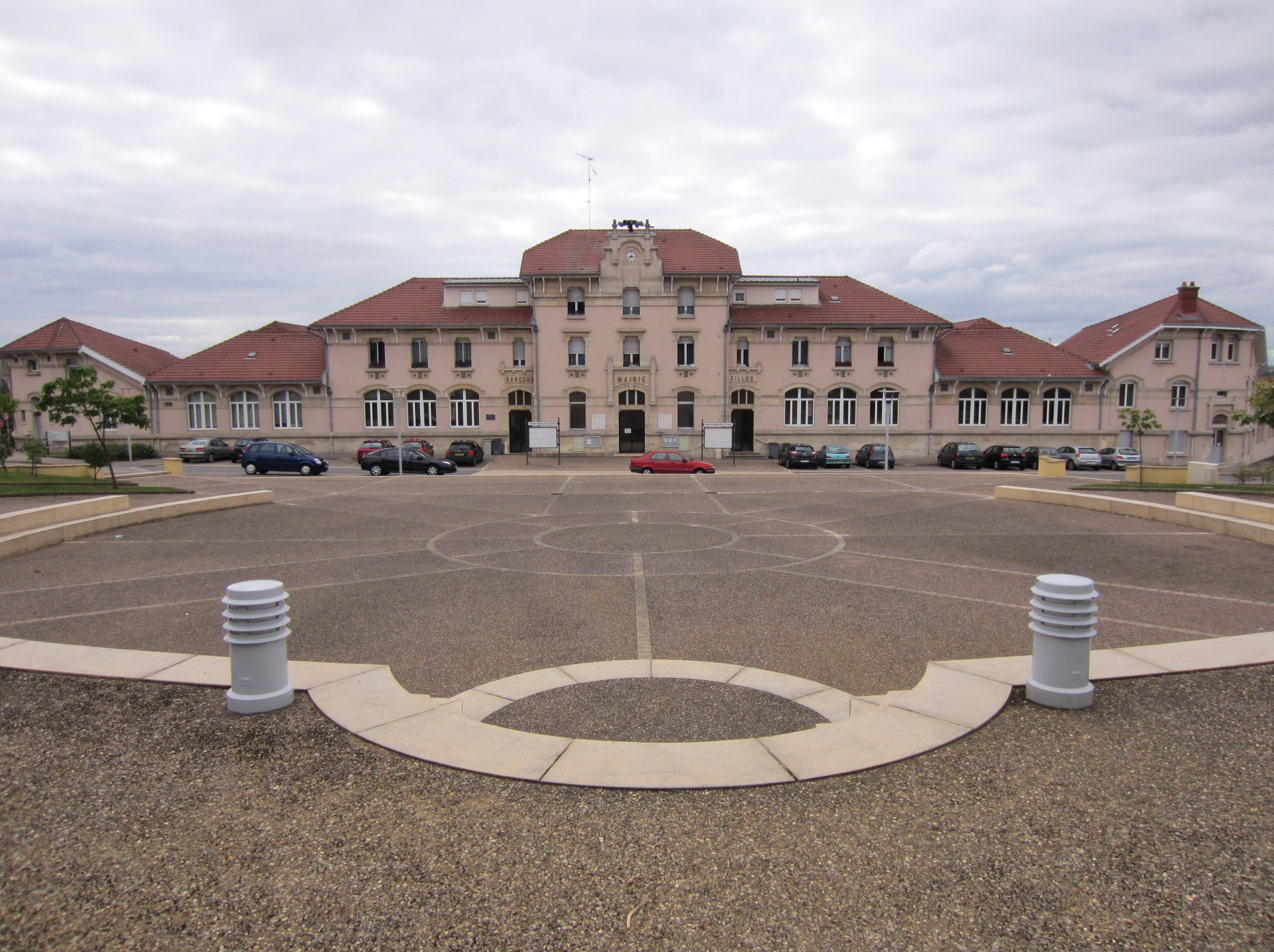
- Mancieulles Town Hall
- Location of Mancieulles
- Location within France Location within Grand Est
- Coordinates: 49°17′04″N 5°53′36″E
- Country: France
- Region: Grand Est
- Department: Meurthe-et-Moselle
- Arrondissement: Briey
- Canton: Pays de Briey
- Commune: Val de Briey
- Area^{1}: 4.39 km^{2} (1.69 sq mi)
- Elevation: 250 m (820 ft)
- Highest elevation: 291 m (955 ft)
- Lowest elevation: 218 m (715 ft)
- Population (2022): 1,801
  - Density: 410/km^{2} (1,060/sq mi)
- Time zone: UTC+01:00 (CET)
  - Summer (DST): UTC+02:00 (CEST)
- Postal code: 54790
- ^{1} French Land Register data, which excludes lakes, ponds, glaciers > 1 km^{2} (0.386 sq mi or 247 acres) and river estuaries.

Mancieulles (French pronunciation: [mɑ̃sjœl]) is a former commune in the Meurthe-et-Moselle department in north-eastern France. On 1 January 2017, it was merged into the new commune Val de Briey. Its population was 1,801 in 2022.

== Location ==
Mancieulles is located near the border with Belgium, about 20 km north of the city of Metz. The village is situated on the banks of the Moselle River, and it is surrounded by forests and rolling hills. The area around Mancieulles has a rich history, dating back to Roman times, and there are many historic sites and landmarks in the vicinity, including the ruins of a Roman aqueduct and several medieval castles.

== See also ==
- Communes of the Meurthe-et-Moselle department
