= Mance =

Mance or mances or variant, may also refer to:

== People ==
- Mance (surname)
- Baron Mance, an aristocratic title of Britain
- Mance Lipscomb (1895–1976), U.S. blues singer
- Mance Post (1925–2013), Dutch artist
- Mance Smith, U.S. baseball player
- Mance Warner, U.S. pro-wrestler

=== Fictional characters ===
- Mance Rayder, a fictional character from G.R.R.Martin's A Song of Ice and Fire and Game of Thrones

== Places ==
- Mance, Meurthe-et-Moselle, a village in France
- Manče, Vipava, Littoral, Slovenia; a village

== Other uses ==
- Mances, a variety of French red wine grape also known as Fer

== See also ==
- Mancey
- Mancy (disambiguation)
