= Byrsonima horneana =

Conservation status
- Data Deficient (IUCN 2.3)

Scientific classification
- Kingdom: Plantae
- Clade: Tracheophytes
- Clade: Angiosperms
- Clade: Eudicots
- Clade: Rosids
- Order: Malpighiales
- Family: Malpighiaceae
- Genus: Byrsonima
- Species: B. horneana

Binomial name
- Byrsonima horneana Britton & Small

Species of plant

Byrsonima horneana is a species of plant in the Malpighiaceae family. It is endemic to Puerto Rico.
