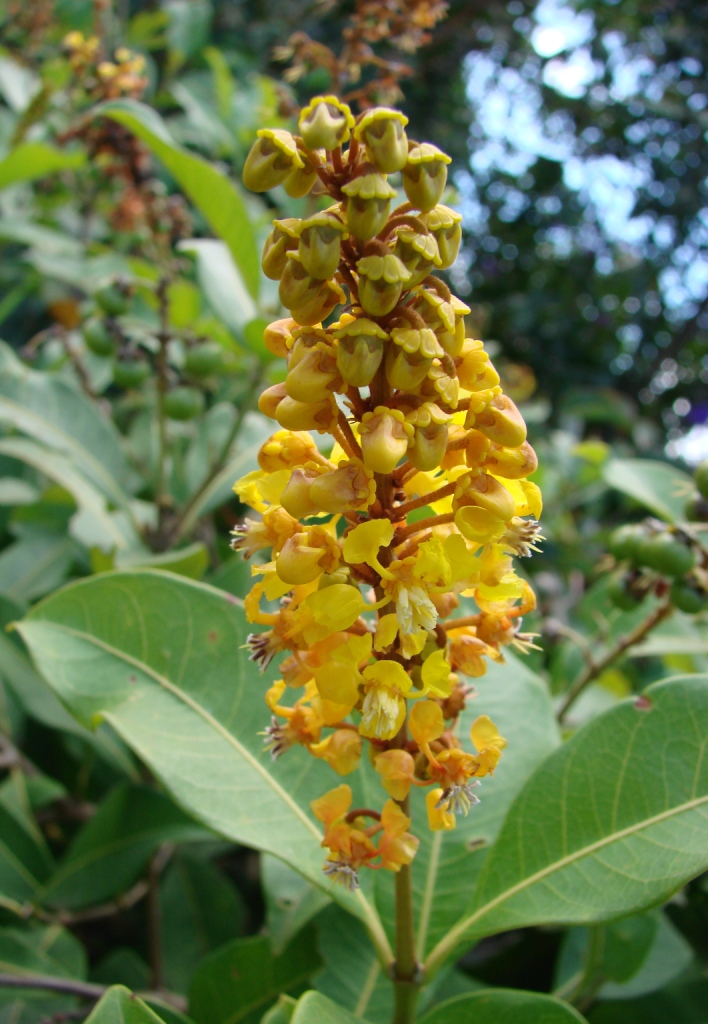
- Byrsonima intermedia

Scientific classification
- Kingdom: Plantae
- Clade: Tracheophytes
- Clade: Angiosperms
- Clade: Eudicots
- Clade: Rosids
- Order: Malpighiales
- Family: Malpighiaceae
- Genus: Byrsonima; Rich ex. Kunth

Diversity
- > 135 species

Synonyms
- Alcoceratothrix Nied. Calyntranthele Nied.

= Byrsonima =

Genus of flowering plants

Byrsonima is one of about 75 genera in the Malpighiaceae, a family of flowering plants in the order Malpighiales. In particular in American English, they are known as locustberries (which also may refer specifically to Byrsonima coccolobifolia or Byrsonima lucida). Another widely seen common name is serrets or serrettes.

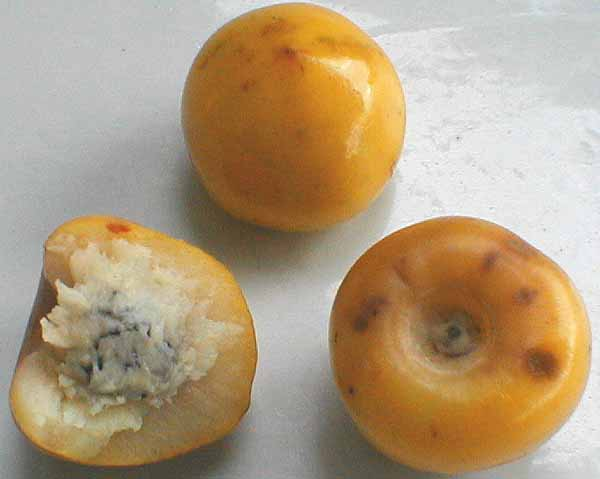
Nance (fruit of B. crassifolia)

Byrsonima comprises over 135 species of trees, shrubs, and subshrubs found in the New World tropics and subtropics from southern Mexico, southeastern Florida, and the Caribbean to southeastern Brazil. The plants have entire leaves, yellow flowers, and fleshy, edible fruits called nance; B. crassifolia in particular is known by that name, as it is an underutilized crop of some commercial importance in Latin America. They are primarily pollinated by various oligolectic native bees (e.g., Centris, Epicharis, and Tetrapedia) that are specialized to collect floral oils, as the flowers do not offer the typical floral rewards.

The fruits of serrette trees are important in the diets of certain wildlife, such as the golden conure (Guaruba guarouba), while the leaves of Byrsonima are food for some of the curious American moth-butterflies (Hedylidae). Plantings of B. crassifolia in the dry savannas of Oaxaca may even be suitable as substitute habitat for the Tehuantepec jackrabbit (Lepus flavigularis), an endangered species presently only found in three small relict populations.

Maricao (B. spicata) is the namesake tree and floral emblem of Maricao, Puerto Rico, and figured on the coat of arms of this city.

== Selected species ==
- Byrsonima basiloba A.Juss.
- Byrsonima coccolobifolia (Spreng.) Kunth
- Byrsonima coriacea (L.) Kunth
- Byrsonima crassa Nied.
- Byrsonima crassifolia (L.) Kunth – nance, savanna serrette, golden spoon, murici, muruci (Brazil), nanche (Mexico)
- Byrsonima crispa A.Juss.
- Byrsonima cydonaefolia A.Juss.
- Byrsonima horneana Britton & Small (Puerto Rico)
- Byrsonima intermedia A.Juss.
- Byrsonima laxiflora Griseb.
- Byrsonima laevigata (Poir.) DC.
- Byrsonima lucida (Mill.) DC. – locustberry, clam cherry, gooseberry
- Byrsonima myricifolia Griseb.
- Byrsonima ophiticola Small ex Britton (Puerto Rico)
- Byrsonima sericea A.Juss.
- Byrsonima spicata (Cav.) DC. – maricao
- Byrsonima subterranea Brade et Markgr.
- Byrsonima tuberosa
- Byrsonima variabilis A.Juss.
- Byrsonima verbascifolia (L.) Rich. ex Juss.
