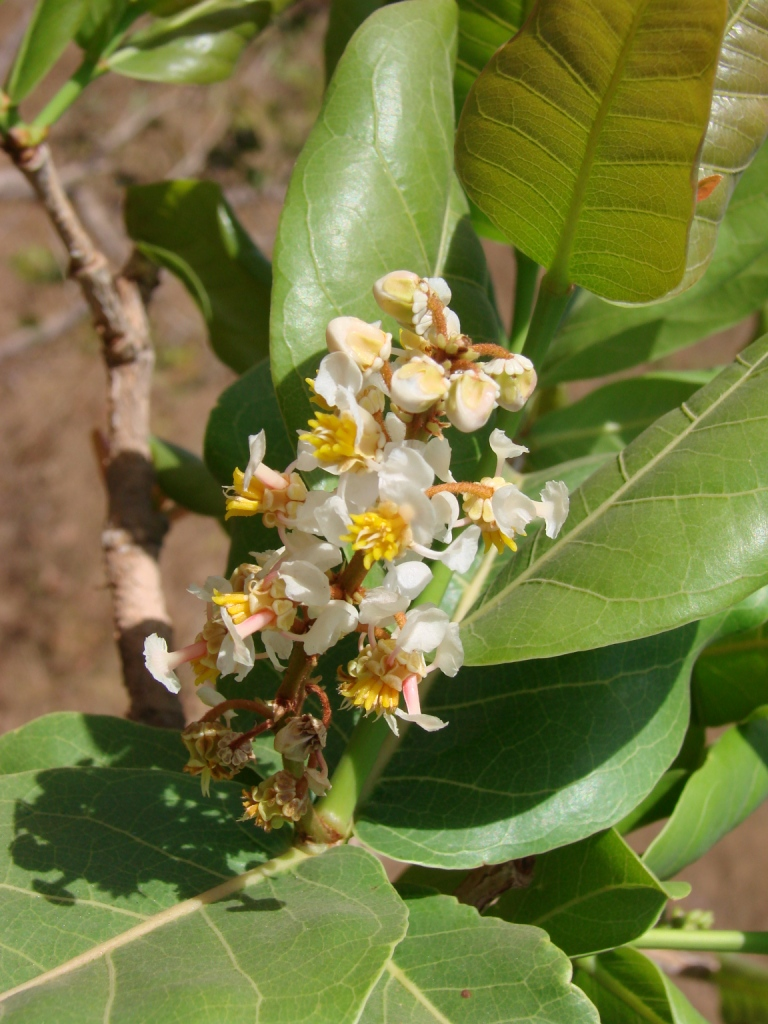

Scientific classification
- Kingdom: Plantae
- Clade: Tracheophytes
- Clade: Angiosperms
- Clade: Eudicots
- Clade: Rosids
- Order: Malpighiales
- Family: Malpighiaceae
- Genus: Byrsonima
- Species: B. coccolobifolia

Binomial name
- Byrsonima coccolobifolia Kunth 1821[1822]

= Byrsonima coccolobifolia =

Species of flowering plant

Byrsonima coccolobifolia is a species of plant in the Malpighiaceae family. It is found in Bolivia, Brazil, Guyana, and Venezuela.
