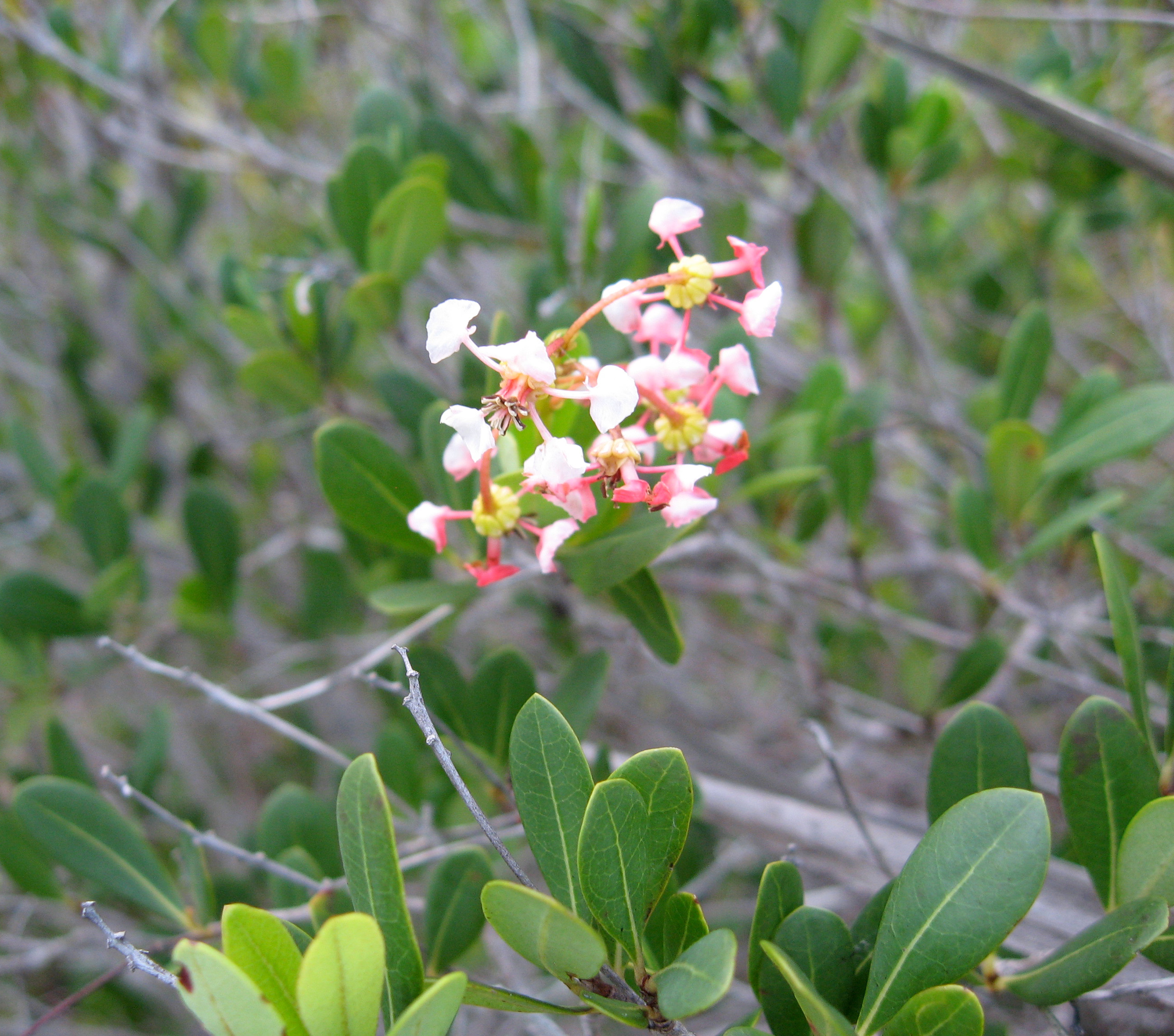

Conservation status
- Apparently Secure (NatureServe)

Scientific classification
- Kingdom: Plantae
- Clade: Tracheophytes
- Clade: Angiosperms
- Clade: Eudicots
- Clade: Rosids
- Order: Malpighiales
- Family: Malpighiaceae
- Genus: Byrsonima
- Species: B. lucida

Binomial name
- Byrsonima lucida (Mill.) DC.

= Byrsonima lucida =

Species of plant

Byrsonima lucida is a species of plant in the Malpighiaceae family. It is endemic to islands in the Caribbean and to the U.S. state of Florida. It is a shrub or small tree, and produces pink flowers. Its natural habitat is hammocks in dry limestone rocklands, and in sandy pine-palm woods.

Common names for the plant include clam cherry, gooseberry, locust berry and Long Key locustberry.
