= Val de Briey =

- Subprefecture and commune
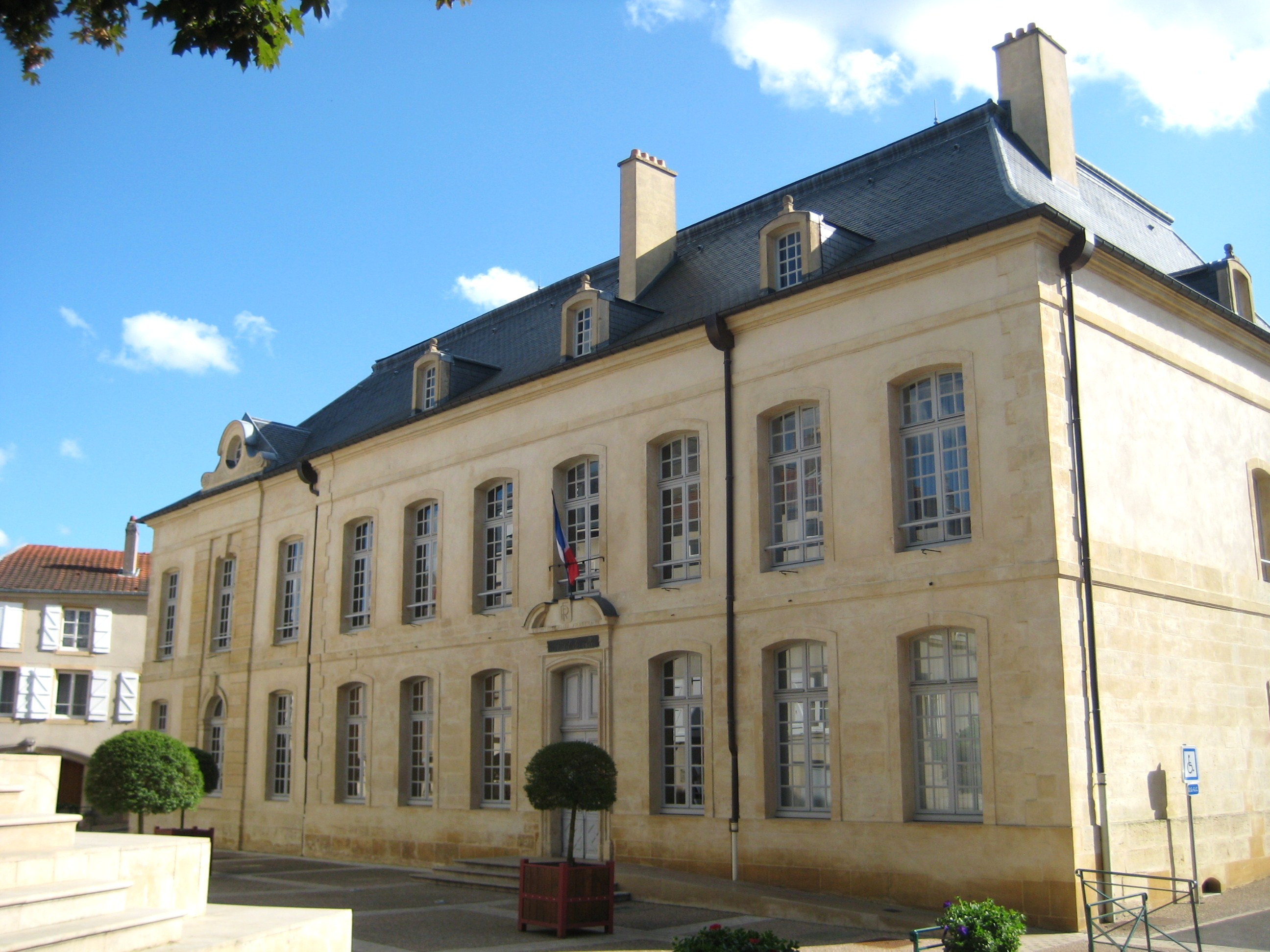
- The town hall in Val de Briey
- Location of Val de Briey
- Location within France Location within Grand Est
- Coordinates: 49°14′56″N 5°56′24″E
- Country: France
- Region: Grand Est
- Department: Meurthe-et-Moselle
- Arrondissement: Val-de-Briey
- Canton: Pays de Briey
- Intercommunality: Orne Lorraine Confluences
- Area^{1}: 38.91 km^{2} (15.02 sq mi)
- Population (2023): 8,130
  - Density: 209/km^{2} (541/sq mi)
- Time zone: UTC+01:00 (CET)
  - Summer (DST): UTC+02:00 (CEST)
- INSEE/Postal code: 54099 /54150
- ^{1} French Land Register data, which excludes lakes, ponds, glaciers > 1 km^{2} (0.386 sq mi or 247 acres) and river estuaries.

Val de Briey (French pronunciation: [val də bʁijɛ], lit. 'Valley of Briey') is a commune in the department of Meurthe-et-Moselle, northeastern France. The municipality was established on 1 January 2017 by merger of the former communes of Briey (the seat), Mancieulles and Mance.

== Population ==
The population data given in the table below refer to the commune in its geography as of January 2025.

Historical population
Year	Pop.	±% p.a.
1968	7,766	—
1975	7,860	+0.17%
1982	6,531	−2.61%
1990	6,612	+0.15%
1999	6,860	+0.41%
2007	7,402	+0.96%
2012	8,138	+1.91%
2017	8,228	+0.22%
2023	8,130	−0.20%
Source: INSEE

== See also ==
- Communes of the Meurthe-et-Moselle department
