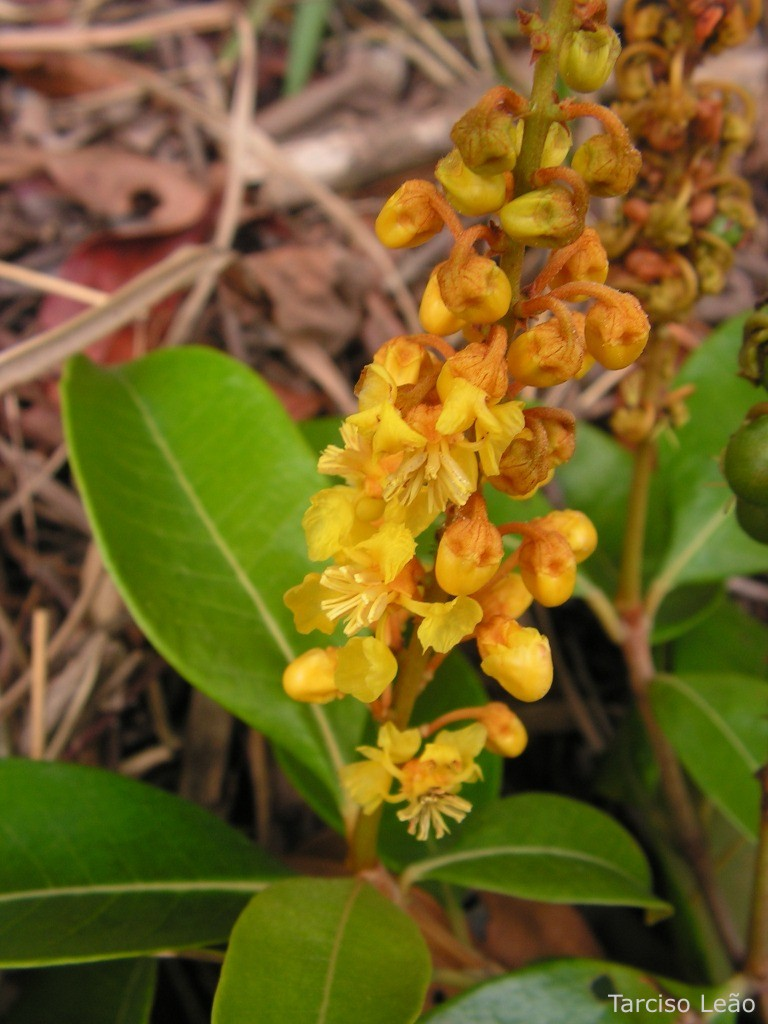

Conservation status
- Least Concern (IUCN 3.1)

Scientific classification
- Kingdom: Plantae
- Clade: Embryophytes
- Clade: Tracheophytes
- Clade: Spermatophytes
- Clade: Angiosperms
- Clade: Eudicots
- Clade: Rosids
- Order: Malpighiales
- Family: Malpighiaceae
- Genus: Byrsonima
- Species: B. sericea

Binomial name
- Byrsonima sericea DC, 1824

Synonyms
- Byrsonima brasiliensis; Byrsonima chrysophylla; Byrsonima eglandulosa

= Byrsonima sericea =

Species of plant

Byrsonima sericea is a species of semi-deciduous tree native to Brazil, Bolivia, Peru, Guyana, and French Guiana.

== Description ==
The tree is medium-sized and usually grows 6–18 meters tall. Flowers are tall orange plumes which develop into small, 8 mm large fruits when mature.

== Ecology ==
Prefers wet deciduous forests, either primary or secondary growth. Usually found in fertile soils by rivers or other small moving bodies of water.

== Uses ==
The plant is used by Brazilians, to whom it is known as murici, to treat gastric injuries, due to the leaves' high content of flavonoids, such as rutin, isoquercitrin, kaempferol 3-O-rutinoside, and querceti, known for their antioxidant properties. It is also used for its tannins.

The health benefits of the plant have been studied in rodents. These include gastroprotective and anti-diarrheal activities. The presence of large amounts of phenolic compounds in the plant such as flavonoids may possess antioxidant capacity. In a study done in the rats, who had been treated with the extract from the plant showed less hepatic damage in their liver cells as in comparison with the negative control group (Wang, 2019).
