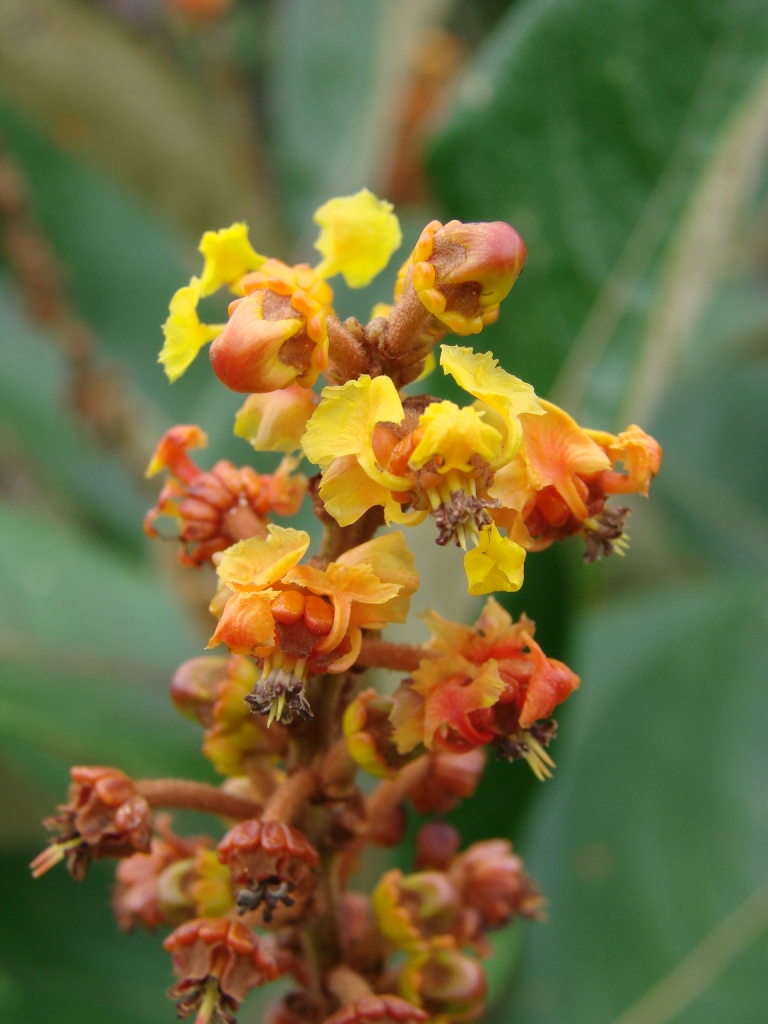

Scientific classification
- Kingdom: Plantae
- Clade: Tracheophytes
- Clade: Angiosperms
- Clade: Eudicots
- Clade: Rosids
- Order: Malpighiales
- Family: Malpighiaceae
- Genus: Byrsonima
- Species: B. basiloba

Binomial name
- Byrsonima basiloba A. Juss. 1840

= Byrsonima basiloba =

Species of flowering plant

Byrsonima basiloba is a species of plant in the Malpighiaceae family. It is found in Brazil.
