= Byrsonima ophiticola =

Conservation status
- Data Deficient (IUCN 2.3)

Scientific classification
- Kingdom: Plantae
- Clade: Embryophytes
- Clade: Tracheophytes
- Clade: Angiosperms
- Clade: Eudicots
- Clade: Rosids
- Order: Malpighiales
- Family: Malpighiaceae
- Genus: Byrsonima
- Species: B. ×ophiticola

Binomial name
- Byrsonima ×ophiticola Small

Species of flowering plant

Byrsonima ×ophiticola, the maricao cimarron tree (Spanish: maricao cimarrón), is a species of plant in the Malpighiaceae family. It is a natural hybrid between Byrsonima lucida and B. spicata and occurs in Puerto Rico and the Leeward Islands. The tree can grow to a height of 8 m (26 ft) or taller.
