= Nance (surname) =

Nance is a Cornish surname. Notable people with the surname include:

- Albinus Nance (1848–1911), American 4th governor of Nebraska
- Eric Nance (1960–2005), American murderer
- Greg Nance (born 1988), American entrepreneur, mountaineer, and endurance athlete
- Jack Nance (1943–1996), American actor
- James J. Nance (1900–1984), American industrialist and president of Studebaker Packard Motor Co.
- Jim Nantz (born 1959), American sportscaster for CBS Sports
- Jim Nance (1942–1992), American AFL player
- John J. Nance (born 1946), American pilot, attorney, aviation- and healthcare safety analyst, and author
- Kenneth Nance (1941–2013), American politician
- Larry Nance (born 1959), American former NBA player
- Larry Nance Jr. (born 1993), American son of the above, NBA player
- Lynn Nance (born 1942), American former college basketball coach
- Malcolm Wrightson Nance (born 1961), American author and counter-terrorism intelligence consultant
- J. Milton Nance (1913–1997), American historian and educator at Texas A&M University
- Ray Nance (1913–1976), American jazz trumpeter, violinist, and singer
- Robert Morton Nance (1873–1959), British writer and leading authority on the Cornish language, nautical archaeologist, and joint founder of the Old Cornwall Society
- Sarafina Nance, American science communicator and astrophysicist
- Tommy Nance (born 1991), American MLB pitcher
- Walter Nance (born 1933), American medical geneticist and evolutionary biologist

== Middle name ==
- John Nance Garner (1868–1967), United States Vice President
