= Nanci =

Nanci is a feminine given name. Notable people with the name include:

- Nanci Bowen (born 1967), American golfer
- Nanci Chambers, Canadian American actress who was born in Ontario, Canada
- Nanci Donnellan, host of The Fabulous Sports Babe
- Nanci Griffith, (1953–2021), American singer, guitarist and songwriter from Austin, Texas
- Nanci Guerrero, Argentine actress, presenter, comedian, and singer
- Nanci Kincaid, American novelist
- Nanci Parilli (born 1953), Argentine Justicialist Party politician

== See also ==
- Nancy (disambiguation)
- Nancey (disambiguation)
- Nance (disambiguation)
