= Jeanne Mance Monument =

Sculpture by Louis-Philippe Hébert

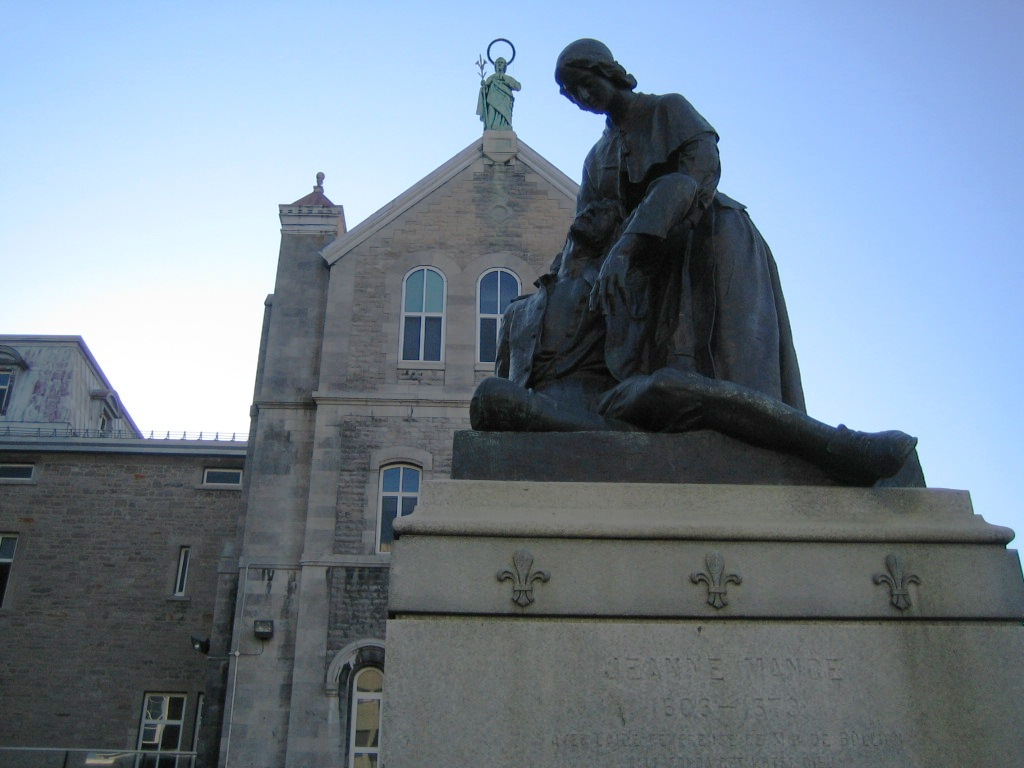
- Interactive map of Jeanne Mance Monument
- Location: Hôtel-Dieu de Montréal
- Coordinates: 45°30′53″N 73°34′44″W
- Designer: Louis-Philippe Hébert
- Type: Monument
- Material: Bronze (sculptural group), Grey granite (pedestal)
- Beginning date: 1909
- Opening date: September 2, 1909
- Dedicated to: Jeanne Mance

The Jeanne Mance Monument is a memorial in Montreal, erected in 1909. It portrays French nurse Jeanne Mance, an early settler of Quebec and one of the founders of Montreal's first hospital, Hôtel-Dieu de Montréal, in 1645.

== Overview ==
The monument by Louis-Philippe Hébert portrays Jeanne Mance comforting an injured colonist.

The monument to Jeanne Mance was unveiled on September 2, 1909, in front of the Hôtel-Dieu de Montréal. In 1909 was celebrated the 250th anniversary of the arrival of the first three hospital sisters (1659). In 1642, she came specifically to establish Montreal's first hospital, Hôtel-Dieu de Montréal. The hospital operated at different location during the New France and moved to present location in 1861.

== Gallery ==
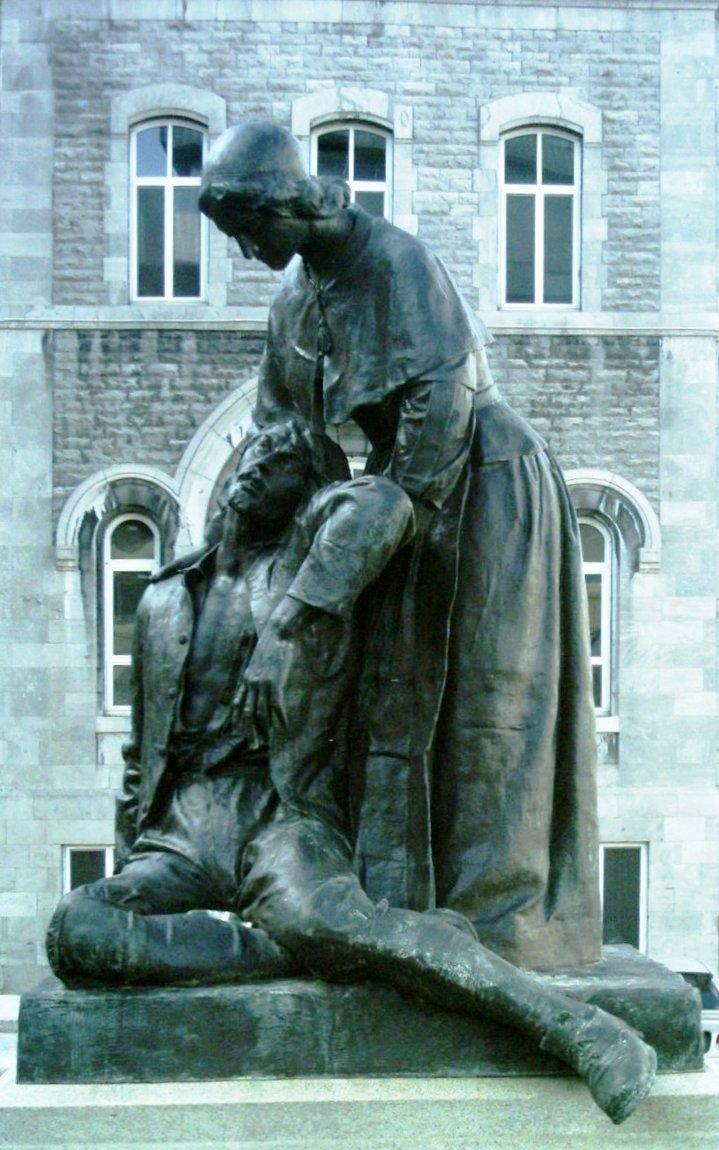
Louis-Philippe Hébert's statue of Jeanne Mance at Hotel Dieu hospital (Montreal)

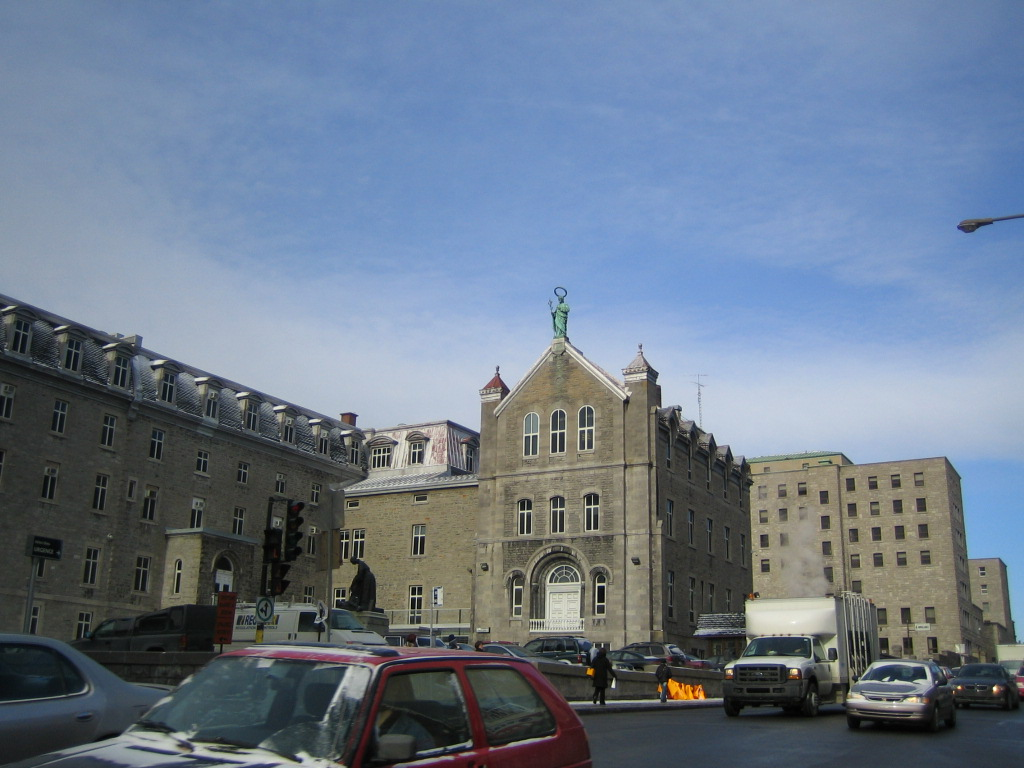
Hôtel-Dieu de Montréal
