= Nance, Missouri =

Extinct town in the American state of Missouri

Coordinates: 36°36′39″N 92°48′01″W

Nance is an extinct town in eastern Taney County, in the Ozarks of southwest Missouri. The GNIS classifies it as a populated place. The townsite sits above the east bank of the west fork of Big Creek about one mile north of U.S. Route 160 and about 1.7 miles west of the Taney - Ozark county line. The site is at an elevation of 876 feet.

== History ==
Early variant names were "Bauff" and "Dit". A post office called Bauff was established in 1858, and closed in 1894. The post office reopened as Dit in 1899, was renamed Nance in 1908, and was discontinued in 1925. The last name was in honor of Jeff Nance, a local civil servant.

The community once had Nance Schoolhouse, now defunct.
