= Mance, Meurthe-et-Moselle =

Mance
- Part of Val de Briey
- Location of Mance
- Location within France Location within Grand Est
- Coordinates: 49°16′10″N 5°55′02″E
- Country: France
- Region: Grand Est
- Department: Meurthe-et-Moselle
- Arrondissement: Briey
- Canton: Pays de Briey
- Commune: Val de Briey
- Area^{1}: 7.39 km^{2} (2.85 sq mi)
- Elevation: 230 m (750 ft)
- Highest elevation: 291 m (955 ft)
- Lowest elevation: 208 m (682 ft)
- Population (2022): 594
  - Density: 80.4/km^{2} (208/sq mi)
- Time zone: UTC+01:00 (CET)
  - Summer (DST): UTC+02:00 (CEST)
- Postal code: 54150
- ^{1} French Land Register data, which excludes lakes, ponds, glaciers > 1 km^{2} (0.386 sq mi or 247 acres) and river estuaries.

Mance (French pronunciation: [mɑ̃s]) is a former commune in the Meurthe-et-Moselle department in north-eastern France. On 1 January 2017, it was merged into the new commune Val de Briey. Its population was 594 in 2022.

== See also ==
- Communes of the Meurthe-et-Moselle department
