= Nancy, Virginia =

Unincorporated community in Virginia, United States

Coordinates: 37°07′48″N 82°16′41″W

Nancy is an unincorporated community in Dickenson County, Virginia, United States.

== History ==
A post office was established at Nancy in 1908, and remained in operation until it was discontinued in 1954. The community's name honors Nancy Counts Anderson.
