= Charlie Mance =

Australian soldier

Charlie Mance (3 December 1900 – 13 September 2001) was a highly decorated Australian soldier who fought in many battles during World War I.

Mance was born Lionel Charles Mance in Stratford, Victoria, son of Albert Earnest and Harriot Agnus Mance. He married Bessie Matilda Luckwill in 1919 and they had one son (Lionel).

== War Service ==
At the age of 16, he lied about his age and enlisted for World War I in Victoria (Private, Regimental Number 763A, Machine Gun Section, No. 1 Battalion) and embarked on the Aeneas in October 1917 for England.

He was transferred to the 22nd Battalion in December 1917, he was wounded-in-action in France on 15 June 1918, but returned to duty with the 6th Brigade 2nd Division on 11 July.

The Australian Imperial Forces took part in the advance south of the Somme, the Hindenburg Line, and Montbrehain in October 1918. He fought in a series of battles, including Ville-sur-Ancre, Villers-Bretonneux, Mont St Quentin and Heleville Wood. He was gassed once, rendering him deaf and blind for weeks, and at Heleville Wood was wounded by shrapnel but remained on duty.

== Aftermath ==
He returned to Australia on the Runic in February 1920 and was discharged March 1920 with 1,061 days of effective service.

The trauma of those years had a bitter aftermath. In the years that followed, he turned to alcohol. Later he decided on reform, abstained from drinking, and for many years ran Alcoholics Anonymous in Merrylands. He extended his work to counseling drug addicts, getting through in some cases to addicts in prison who were considered beyond help. He contributed to charity and to schools, appearing at Merrylands High School for many years where his great-granddaughters Danielle, Tracey and Mellisa Mance attended school. Mance tried to educate everyone around him about the horrors of war.

He also learned bricklaying under the repatriation Post War Reconstruction Training Scheme and worked as a bricklayer in Victoria and Canberra. He moved to Merrylands in 1953. He continued to work as a bricklayer until he retired in 1960.

Mance died at the age of 101 and was given a state funeral at St Andrew's Cathedral, Sydney.

== Honours ==
Mance received many honours and Medals, they include the Légion d'honneur, France's greatest decoration, in recognition of the esteem in which France holds the contribution of Australia and its other allies. He was one of the first Allied veterans in the world to receive the honour.

He was presented with a medal by the prime minister in 1998 to commemorate the 80th anniversary of the end of World War I. (80th Anniversary Armistice Remembrance Medal.) He also received the Victory Medal and the British War Medal. He was president of the First World War Diggers Association.

In 1998 Holroyd City Council presented Charles Mance with the "Keys to the City" at a civic reception held in his honour. A portrait painted by Leahlani Johnson, commissioned by the Merrylands RSL Club, hangs in the foyer of Holroyd City Council.

Charlie Mance was a key figure in the establishment of the Gallipoli Scholarship. A scholarship awarded to direct descendants of soldiers in Australian conflicts who wish to attend university or TAFE. The Gallipoli Scholarship awards recipients with $6000 a year towards their education fees.

In 2000, Mance was the guest of honor at the unveiling of the digger statue, on the newly named "ANZAC Bridge". This statue was said to have been made in his image.

A man that wants war is not right in the head. Nobody won the First World War. Both sides were flat out. We were glad to finish it.

— Charlie Mance
