= Nancey Jackson Johnson =

- Also known as: Minister Jackson Johnson
- Born: May 3, 1968 (age 58); Newark, New Jersey
- Genres: Gospel, traditional black gospel, urban contemporary gospel, soul
- Occupations: Singer, songwriter
- Instruments: Vocals, singer-songwriter
- Years active: 1991–present
- Labels: Savoy, Harmony
- Website: nanceyjacksonjohnson.com

Minister Nancey Jackson Johnson (born May 3, 1968) is an American gospel musician, and is currently the creative arts director and minister for Greater St. John M.E.R. that is located in Elizabeth, New Jersey. Her first album, Nancey Jackson, was released by Savoy Records in 1991. She released, Free (Yes I'm Free), with Harmony Records in 1997, and this was a Billboard magazine breakthrough release upon the Gospel Albums. The third album, Relationships, was released in 1999 with Harmony Records, and this charted upon the aforementioned chart.

== Early life ==
Minister Jackson Johnson was born in Newark, New Jersey, on May 3, 1968, whose father was the pastor at St. John's Methodist Episcopal Reformed Church.

== Music career ==
Her music recording career commenced in 1991, with the release of Nancey Jackson, by Savoy Records on July 1, 1991. She released, Free (Yes I'm Free), on October 7, 1997 with Harmony Records, and this was her breakthrough release upon the Billboard magazine Gospel Albums chart at No. 29. The subsequent album, Relationships, was released by Harmony Records on June 29, 1999, and this placed even higher on the aforementioned chart at No. 23.

== Personal life ==
Minister Jackson Johnson has been married to her husband for over 20 years, Samuel, and together they have two sons.

== Discography ==
List of studio albums, with selected chart positions
Title	Album details	Peak chart positions
Title	Album details	US Gos
Nancey Jackson	Released: July 1, 1991; Label: Savoy; CD, digital download	–
Free (Yes I'm Free)	Released: October 7, 1997; Label: Harmony; CD, digital download	29
Relationships	Released: June 29, 1999; Label: Harmony; CD, digital download	23
