= Subprefectures in France =

Administrative division of France

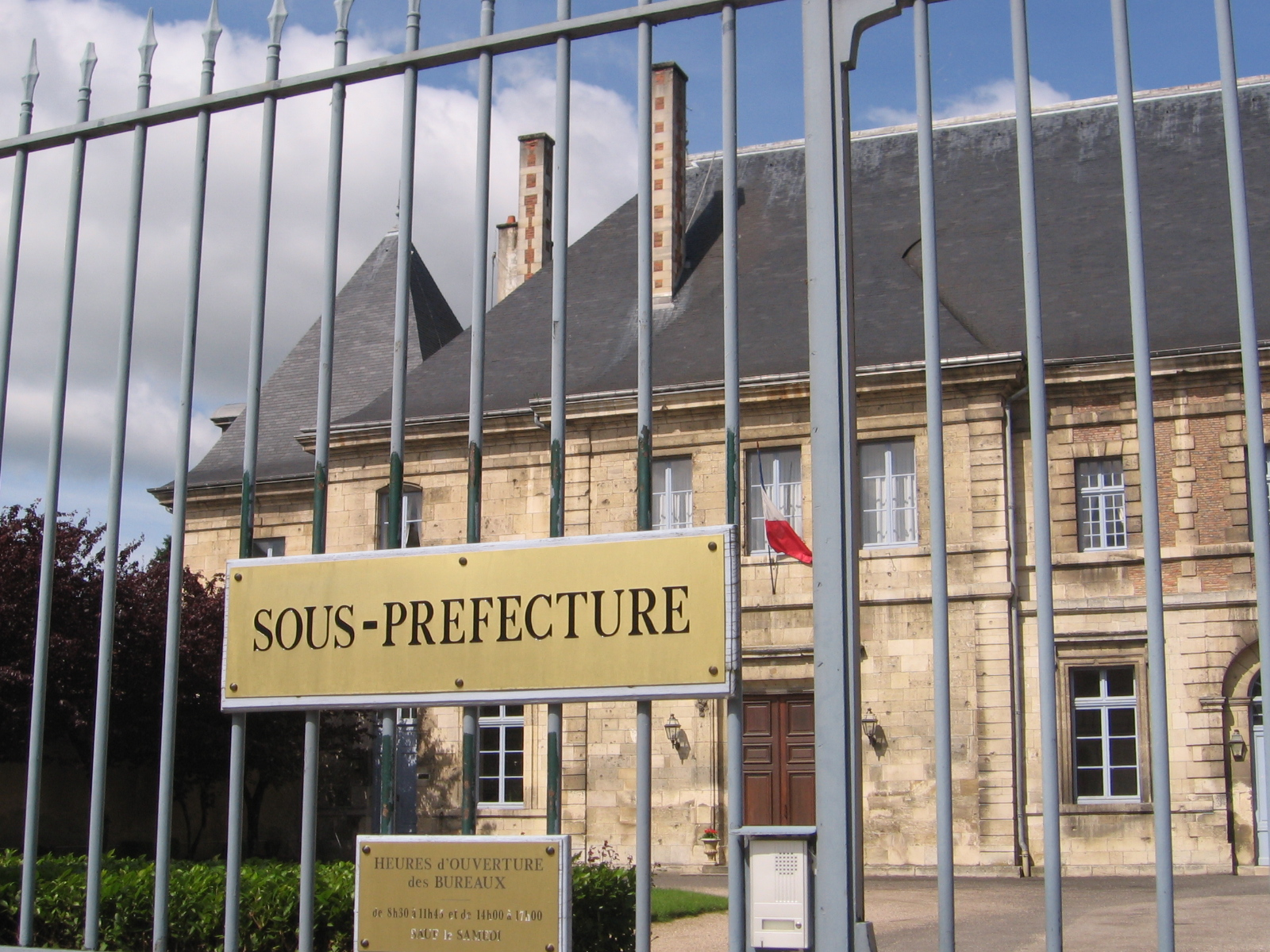
Subprefecture of Verdun, Meuse

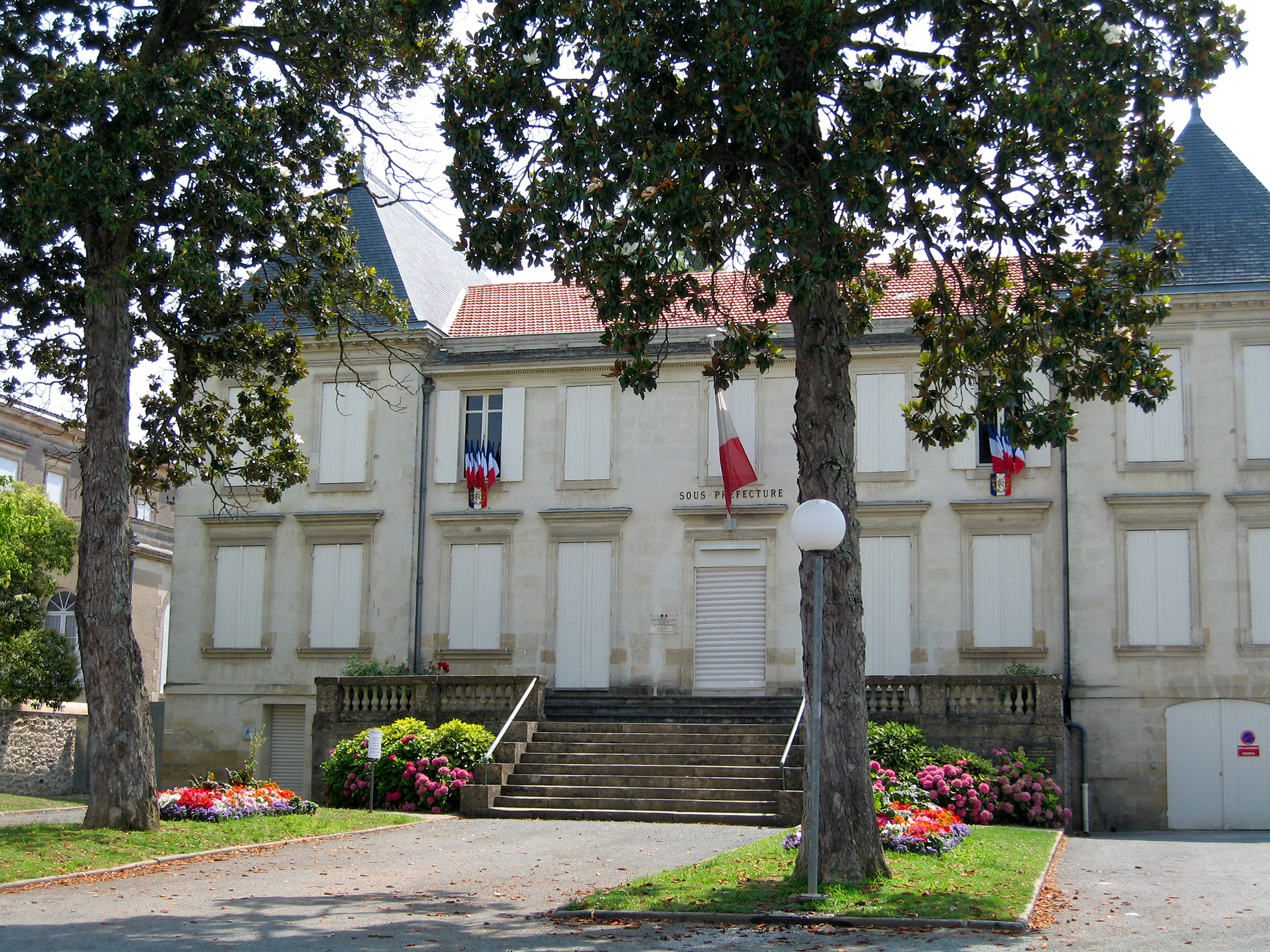
Subprefecture of Langon, Gironde

In France, a subprefecture (French: sous-préfecture, pronounced [su pʁefɛktyʁ]) is the commune that hosts the administrative centre of an arrondissement, the primary division of a department, except for the commune that serves that function for the whole department, known as the prefecture. The proper legal name is arrondissement chief place (French: chef-lieu d'arrondissement).

The term properly applies to the government office headed by the subprefect, a civil servant representing the central government, as well as the building that houses it. (Between May 1982 and February 1988, subprefects were known instead by the title of deputy commissioner of the Republic, commissaire adjoint de la République.) The subprefect is assisted by a secretary general; in the arrondissement where the prefecture is located, its secretary general carries out duties equivalent to those of the subprefect.

The municipal arrondissements of Paris, Marseille and Lyon are special divisions of the commune rather than the department, and do not have a subprefect.

== See also ==
- Prefectures in France
- List of subprefectures of France
- List of arrondissements of France
