= Mancey =

- Commune
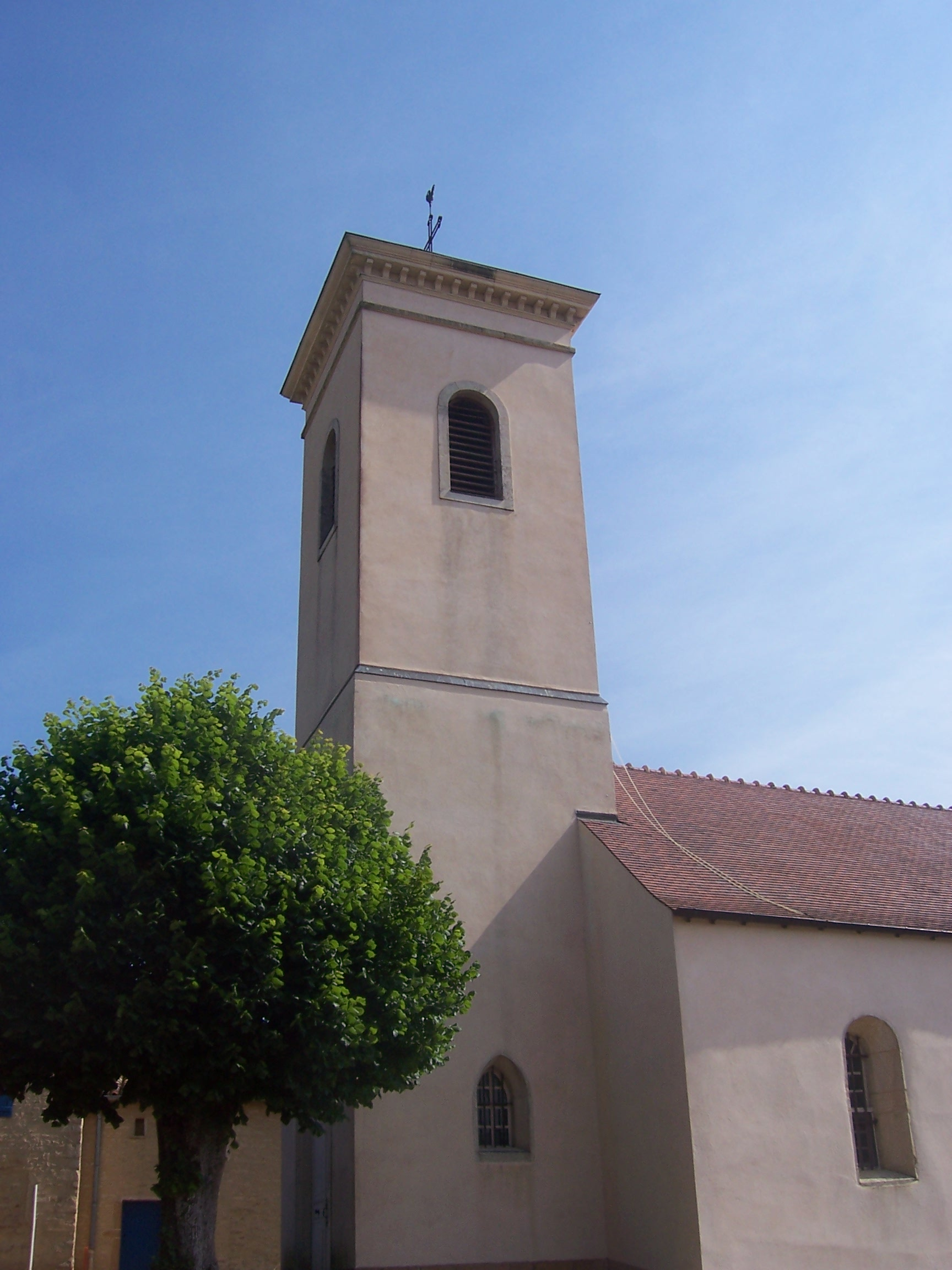
- The church in Mancey
- Location of Mancey
- Location within France Location within Bourgogne-Franche-Comté
- Coordinates: 46°34′34″N 4°49′59″E
- Country: France
- Region: Bourgogne-Franche-Comté
- Department: Saône-et-Loire
- Arrondissement: Chalon-sur-Saône
- Canton: Tournus
- Intercommunality: Entre Saône et Grosne

Government
  - Mayor (2022–2026): Françoise Bernard
- Area^{1}: 10.02 km^{2} (3.87 sq mi)
- Elevation: 500 m (1,600 ft)
- Highest elevation: 501 m (1,644 ft)
- Lowest elevation: 207 m (679 ft)
- Population (2023): 392
  - Density: 39.1/km^{2} (101/sq mi)
- Time zone: UTC+01:00 (CET)
  - Summer (DST): UTC+02:00 (CEST)
- INSEE/Postal code: 71274 /71240
- ^{1} French Land Register data, which excludes lakes, ponds, glaciers > 1 km^{2} (0.386 sq mi or 247 acres) and river estuaries.

Mancey (French pronunciation: [mɑ̃sɛ]) is a commune in the Saône-et-Loire department in the region of Bourgogne-Franche-Comté in eastern France.

== See also ==
- Communes of the Saône-et-Loire department
