= List of people with surname Roberts =

Roberts is a surname of Germanic origin. This list provides links to biographies of people who share this surname.

== A ==
- Mrs A. V. Roberts (died 1969), Australian feminist activist
- Abraham Roberts, British general, father of Earl Roberts
- Ada Palmer Roberts, American poet
- Adam Roberts (disambiguation), several people
- Alan Roberts (disambiguation), several people
- Alasdair Roberts (musician), Scottish folk musician
- Alasdair Roberts (academic), law professor and author
- Albert Roberts (disambiguation), several people
  - Albert H. Roberts, American politician
- Alby Roberts, New Zealand cricketer
- Alf Roberts, fictional character from Coronation Street
- Alf Roberts (trade unionist) (1910–1971), British engineering industry trade unionist
- Alfred Roberts (disambiguation), several people
  - Alfred Roberts (trade unionist) (1897–1963), British cotton industry trade unionist
  - Alfred Jabez Roberts (1863–1939), South Australian stockbroker and sportsman
  - Alfred "Uganda" Roberts (1943–2020), American percussionist
  - Alfred Roberts, politician, father of Margaret Thatcher
- Alice Roberts, English anatomist, osteoarchaeologist and presenter
- Allene Roberts, American actress
- Alphonso Theodore Roberts, cricketer and activist from Trinidad and Tobago
- Alton Wayne Roberts, Ku Klux Klan member
- Amabel Scharff Roberts (1891–1918), American nurse
- Ambrose Roberts (1875–1945), Australian temperance activist
- Amos Roberts, Australian rugby league player
- Andrew Roberts (disambiguation), several people
  - Andrew Roberts (historian), English historian
  - Andy Roberts (cricketer), Antiguan cricketer
  - Andy Roberts (musician), English musician
  - Andy Roberts (singer) (1926–2017), stage name of American singer
- Anil Roberts, Trinidad and Tobago politician
- Anita Roberts, American molecular biologist
- Ann Roberts (disambiguation), several people
  - Anna Roberts, Canadian politician
  - Anne Roberts, Canadian politician
- Anthony Roberts (disambiguation), several people
  - Anthony Ellmaker Roberts, American politician
- Arthur Roberts (disambiguation), several people
  - Arthur Roberts (comedian), English music hall entertainer
  - Arthur Roberts (film editor), American film editor
  - Arthur Roberts (physicist), American physicist and composer
  - Arthur Spencer Roberts, English painter
- Ashley Roberts, American burlesque dancer
- Audrey Roberts, fictional character from Coronation Street TV series
- Austin Roberts (disambiguation), several people
  - Austin Roberts (zoologist), South African zoologist
  - Austin Roberts (American football), American football player

== B ==
- Barbara Roberts, American politician
- Barbara Millicent Roberts, fictional name of doll Barbie
- Bartholomew Roberts, Welsh pirate Black Bart
- Ben Roberts (poker player), British poker player
- Ben Roberts (actor), television actor
- Benjamin Titus Roberts, American Methodist minister
- Bernadette Roberts, Catholic contemplative
- Bernard Roberts, English pianist
- Betty Roberts, American politician
- Bill Roberts (athlete), British sprinter
- Billy Roberts, American songwriter (Hey Joe)
- Bip Roberts, American baseball player
- Bob Roberts, American recording artist
- Brad Roberts, Canadian musician
- Bradley Roberts (rugby union), Wales international rugby union player
- Bradley Roberts (American politician) (1908–1976)
- Bradley Roberts (Bahamian politician) (1943–2018)
- Brian Roberts (disambiguation), several people, including:
  - Brian Roberts (baseball), American baseball player
- Brian L. Roberts, American CEO
- Brigham Henry Roberts, American Latter Day Saints leader and historian
- Bryn Roberts (1897-1964), Welsh trade unionist
- Buddy Roberts, American wrestler
- Byron Roberts (producer), American motion picture producer
- Byron Roberts, English heavy metal musician

== C ==
- C. R. Roberts (1936–2023), American football player
- Carl Glennis Roberts (1886–1950), American surgeon, civil rights activist
- Cecil Roberts (disambiguation), several people including
  - Cecil Roberts (1892–1976), English novelist
  - Cecil Roberts (labor unionist) (born 1946), president of the United Mine Workers of America
  - Cecil Roberts (politician) (1877–1961), Australian politician
- Charles Roberts (disambiguation), several people including
  - Charles Boyle Roberts (1842–1899), U.S. Congressman from Maryland
  - Charles Carl Roberts IV, perpetrator of the West Nickel Mines School shooting
  - Charles E. Roberts (mathematician) (1942–2023), American mathematician
  - Charles S. Roberts (1930–2010), American boardgame creator, founder of Avalon Hill
  - Charles Roberts (Canadian football) (born 1979), Canadian football player
  - Charles G. D. Roberts (1860–1943), Canadian poet and author
- Charlie Roberts (footballer) (1883–1939), English footballer
- Charlotte Roberts (born 1957), British bioarchaeologist and palaeopathologist
- Chris Roberts (disambiguation), several people including
  - Chris Roberts (skateboarder), American skateboarder, founder of The Nine Club.
  - Chris Roberts (baseball) (born 1971), American baseball player and coach
  - Chris Roberts (chairman), ex-chairman of Torquay United Football Club
  - Chris Roberts (video game developer) (born 1968), American video game designer and director
  - Chris Roberts (pilot) (born 1945), British former test pilot, and Red Arrows pilot
  - Chris Roberts (singer) (1944–2017), German singer and actor
  - Chris Ioan Roberts (born 1985), Australian actor
- Christian Roberts (footballer) (born 1979), Welsh footballer
- Christian Roberts (actor) (1944–2022), English actor
- Christopher B. Roberts, American academic
- Christopher Trevor-Roberts (died 2005), British teacher
- Clarence J. Roberts (1873–1931), Justice of the New Mexico Supreme Court
- Clifford Roberts (1894–1977), Augusta National chairman
- Clint Roberts (disambiguation), several people including
  - Clint Roberts (politician) (1935–2017), South Dakota politician
  - Clint Roberts (broadcaster) (born 1987), New Zealand radio host
- Cokie Roberts (1943–2019), American broadcast journalist
- Colin Henderson Roberts (1909–1990), British classical scholar and publisher
- Connor Roberts (disambiguation), several people including
  - Connor Roberts (footballer, born 1995), Welsh footballer
  - Connor Roberts (footballer, born 1992), Welsh footballer
- Cord Roberts, fictional character from the soap opera One Life to Live
- Craig Roberts (disambiguation), several people including
  - Craig Roberts (born 1991), Welsh actor and director
  - Craig Roberts (wrestler) (1968–2006), Canadian wrestler
  - Craig G. Roberts (1930–2009), American horse trainer
- Crystal-Donna Roberts (1984–2025), South African actress, presenter, and writer
- Curt Roberts (1929–1969), Major League baseball second baseman
- Curtis Roberts (born 1975), West Indian cricketer

== D ==
- Dale Roberts (disambiguation), multiple people
- Dan Roberts (disambiguation), multiple people
- Daniel Roberts (disambiguation), multiple people
- Danny Roberts (Australian actor)
- Danny Roberts (The Real World), American best known for appearing on The Real World: New Orleans
- Darrell Roberts, American guitarist
- Dave Roberts (outfielder), American baseball outfielder
- Dave Roberts (pitcher), American major league baseball pitcher
- David Roberts (disambiguation), several people including
  - David Roberts (mayor) (born 1956), the 36th mayor of Hoboken, New Jersey
  - David Roberts (painter), Scottish painter
  - David Roberts (swimmer), Welsh swimmer
  - David Thomas Roberts, American ragtime composer
- Dean Roberts (musician), New Zealand musician
- Deborah Roberts, American broadcaster
- Denise Roberts, Australian actress
- Denys Roberts (1923–2013), British colonial official and judge, British administrator in Hong Kong
- Desmond Roberts, English actor
- Dick Roberts (disambiguation), several people
- Donald John Roberts (1945–2026), Canadian-American economist and academic
- Donna Roberts, American murderer on Ohio death row
- Doris Roberts, American actress
- Douglas Roberts, Australian painter and art critic
- Douglas B. Roberts, American politician
- Dread Pirate Roberts, fictional character from The Princess Bride
- Drucilla Roberts Bickford (1925–2024), American politician

== E ==
- Ed Roberts (disambiguation), several people including:
  - Ed Roberts (activist) (1939–1995), American disability rights activist
  - Ed Roberts (computer engineer), American engineer & entrepreneur
  - Edward Glenn Roberts, Jr., race driver Fireball Roberts
  - Edward B. Roberts, American technology writer, academic and investor
  - Edward D. Roberts, American politician
  - Edward Roberts (Canadian politician), Canadian politician
- Eigra Lewis Roberts (1939–2026), Welsh author
- Eirlys Roberts, British consumer advocate and campaigner
- Eleazar Roberts, Welsh musician and translator
- Elijah Roberts (born 2001), American football player
- Eliza Roberts (British nurse), British nurse of the Crimean War
- Elizabeth Roberts (disambiguation), several people including:
  - Elizabeth Ann Roberts (born 1941), American model
  - Elizabeth H. Roberts (born 1957), former Rhode Island lieutenant governor
  - Elizabeth Madox Roberts, Kentucky-born author
  - Elizabeth Roberts (murder victim) (1959–1977), American murder victim unidentified for 43 years
  - Elizabeth Wentworth Roberts (1871–1927), American painter
- Emais Roberts, Palauan politician and physician
- Emma Roberts (born 1991), American actress
  - Lady Gerald Fitzalan-Howard, born Emma Roberts, British aristocrat
- Eric Roberts (born 1956), American actor, brother of Julia Roberts
- Ethan Roberts (born 1997), American baseball player
- Eugene Roberts (neuroscientist) (1920–2016), American neuroscientist
- Evan Roberts (disambiguation), several people including
  - Evan Roberts (radio personality), American radio personality
  - Evan Roberts (minister) (1878–1951), Welsh evangelist

== F ==
- Floyd Roberts, American racing driver
- Frank Roberts (disambiguation), several people named Frank Roberts
- Frederick Roberts (disambiguation), several people named Fred or Frederick Roberts, including:
  - Fred Roberts, American basketball player
  - Fred Roberts (American football coach), coach of the Oklahoma Sooners in 1901
  - Fred Roberts (Royal Air Force officer), Welsh RAF officer and cricketer
  - Fred Roberts (footballer, born 1905), Irish footballer
  - Fred Roberts (footballer, born 1909), English football forward, with Birmingham and Luton Town
  - Fred Roberts (rugby union), New Zealand rugby union footballer who played for The Original All Blacks
  - Fred S. Roberts, professor of mathematics at Rutgers University
  - Frederick Roberts, 1st Earl Roberts, British field marshal
  - Frederick Roberts (British Army officer, born 1872), British Army officer, son of Earl Roberts
  - Frederick Roberts (cricketer, born 1848), English cricketer for Surrey
  - Frederick Roberts (politician), British Labour Party Member of Parliament
  - Frederick Roberts (Somerset cricketer), English cricketer for Somerset
  - Frederick G. Roberts, English cricketer for Gloucestershire
  - Frederick Madison Roberts, American politician

== G ==
- Gareth Roberts (writer) (born 1968), British television writer
- Gareth Roberts (footballer), Welsh (soccer) footballer
- Gary Roberts (ice hockey), Canadian ice hockey player
- Garry Roberts (1950–2022), Irish rock guitarist, formerly with the Boomtown Rats
- Gene Roberts (disambiguation), several people including
  - Gene Roberts, name used by actress Meg Randall, before 1949
  - Gene Roberts (American football), NFL football player
- George Roberts (disambiguation), several people including
  - George Roberts (trombonist), American musician
  - George Henry Roberts, British Labour MP, Minister of Labour
  - George Philip Bradley Roberts, British World War II general
  - George R. Roberts, American financier
  - George W. Roberts, American soldier
- Gertrud Roberts, American composer and harpsichodist
- Gilbert Roberts (civil engineer) (1899–1978), British civil engineer
- Gilbert Roberts (Royal Navy officer) (1900–1986), strategist in WWII
- Gilroy Roberts, engraver for the United States Mint
- Gladys Roberts (c. 1887/1888–1975), English suffragette
- Glenn D. Roberts, Wisconsin politician and lawyer
- Gordon Ray Roberts, American soldier
- Graham Roberts, English footballer
- Grant Roberts, American baseball player
- Greg Roberts (Designer), American Game Designer
- Gregory David Roberts, Australian criminal and writer
- Gwilym Roberts, British politician

== H ==
- Hank Roberts (born 1954), American jazz cellist
- Harry Roberts (disambiguation), several people including
  - Harry Roberts (inventor), Swedish inventor
  - Harry Roberts (murderer), British murderer
- Helen Roberts (1912-2010), British soprano
- Herbie Roberts, English (soccer) footballer
- Holly Roberts, American artist
- Howard Roberts, American jazz guitarist
- Howard Roberts (sculptor), American sculptor
- Howard Radclyffe Roberts, American entomologist and museum administrator
- Hugh Roberts (disambiguation), several people
- Hannah Roberts (disambiguation), several people
- Haydon Roberts, English footballer
- Hubert Roberts (born 1961), American-Israeli basketball player

== I ==
- Ian Roberts (painter), Iain Roberts, Australian painter
- Iain Roberts, New Zealand skeleton racer
- Ian Roberts (disambiguation), several people
- Isaac Roberts, British astronomer
- Issachar Jacox Roberts, American Baptist missionary
- Ivor Roberts (actor), English actor and television presenter
- Ivor Roberts (ambassador), British ambassador to Italy
- Iwan Roberts, Welsh international footballer

== J ==
- J. O. M. Roberts (1916–1997), Himalayan mountaineer-explorer
- Jaeden Roberts (born 2002), American football player
- Jake Roberts (born 1955), Jake "The Snake" Roberts, American professional wrestler
- Jamal Roberts (born 1997), American singer
- Jamal Roberts (American football) (born 2004), American football player
- James Reynolds Roberts (1826–1859), British soldier
- Jamie Roberts (born 1986), Welsh Rugby player
- Jane Roberts (disambiguation), several people including
  - Jane Roberts (1929–1984), American psychic
  - Jane Roberts (first lady) (c. 1819–1914), First Lady of Liberia
  - Jane Roberts, Lady Roberts (1949–2021), British Royal librarian
- Jason Roberts (disambiguation), several people including
  - Jason Roberts (author), American author
  - Jason Roberts (footballer) (born 1978), Grenadian football player
  - Jason Roberts (weightlifter), Australian weightlifter
- Jenn Roberts, Australian politician
- Jeremy Dale Roberts (1934–2017), English composer
- Jeron Roberts (born 1976), American-Israeli basketball player
- Jimmy Roberts (disambiguation), several people including
  - Jimmy Roberts, NBC sports broadcaster
  - Jimmy Roberts (singer), featured performer on the Lawrence Welk Show
  - Jimmy T. Roberts, cult leader
- J.J. Roberts (American football) (born 2001), American football player
- Joan Roberts, American actress
- Joe Roberts, American motorcycle racer
- John Roberts (disambiguation), several people including
  - John Roberts, 1st Baron Clwyd (1863–1955), Welsh Liberal politician
  - Trevor Roberts, 2nd Baron Clwyd (1900–1987), Welsh politician
  - John G. Roberts Jr (born 1955), 17th Chief Justice of the United States
  - John Roberts (television reporter), aka "J.D. Roberts", television journalist with CBS News, CTV, CNN
  - John Roberts (Canadian politician), member of the Parliament of Canada
  - John Roberts (historian), Oxford historian and author
  - John Roberts (philosopher), British philosopher and art theorist
  - John Roberts (Speed Channel host), television host on the Speed Channel
  - John Roberts (Australian businessman), John C. Roberts, founder of Multiplex, an Australian construction firm
  - John Roberts (martyr), Saint John Roberts, one of the Catholic Forty Martyrs of England and Wales
  - John Roberts (Royal Navy officer) (1924–2025), British naval officer
  - John Roberts (urban planner), founder of TEST Transport & Environment Studies consultancy
  - John Maddox Roberts, American science fiction writer
  - John Milton Roberts, anthropologist
  - John Q. Roberts, United States Navy officer, pilot, and Navy Cross recipient
  - John Roberts (mayor), New Zealand businessman and politician
- Jonathan Roberts (politician), American farmer, U.S. Senator for Pennsylvania
- Jonathan Roberts (writer), (fl. 1990s), American author, screenwriter, and TV producer
- Jonathan M. Roberts, writer
- Joseph Jenkins Roberts, first President of Liberia
- Julia Roberts, American actress
- Julia Roberts (QVC presenter)
- Julian Roberts, English librarian and bibliographer
- Julian Roberts (businessman), Chief Executive of Old Mutual plc
- Julie Roberts, American country singer
- Julie Roberts (artist), Welsh painter
- Juliet Roberts, British singer
- Justine Roberts, British cofounder of Mumsnet
- J'Wan Roberts (born 2001), American basketball player

== K ==
- Kane Roberts (born 1962), American guitarist
- Kate Roberts (author) (1891–1985), Welsh novelist
- Katherine Roberts (author), English writer
- Katherine Roberts (TV personality)
- Kathryn Roberts, English folk musician
- Keith Roberts, British science fiction writer
- Kelso Roberts, Canadian politician
- Ken Roberts (disambiguation), several people including:
  - Ken Roberts (announcer), American radio and television announcer
  - Ken Roberts (author), Canadian children's writer
  - Ken Roberts (footballer, born 1936), English football coach
- Kennedy Roberts Grenadian Entrepreneur
- Kenneth Roberts (author), American historical novelist
- Kenny Roberts, American motorcycle racer
- Kenny Roberts Jr., American motorcycle racer
- Kevin Roberts (disambiguation)
- Kurtis Roberts, American motorcycle racer

== L ==
- Lawrence Roberts (disambiguation), several people including
  - Lawrence Roberts (basketball), American basketball player
  - Lawrence Roberts (scientist), Larry Roberts, American Internet developer
- Lemuel Roberts, American Revolutionary War soldier and author
- Leon Roberts, American baseball player
- Leona Vidal Roberts, Falkland Islands politician.
- Leonard Roberts, American actor
- Les Roberts (disambiguation), several people including
  - Les Roberts (mystery novel writer), American mystery novel writer
  - Les Roberts (epidemiologist), American epidemiologist
- Leslie Roberts Canadian television journalist
- Lewis Roberts-Thomson, Australian rules footballer
- Lincoln Roberts, cricketer from Trinidad and Tobago
- Lisa Roberts (disambiguation), several people
- Loren Roberts, American golfer
- Loula E. Roberts, American suffragist
- Luckey Roberts, (1887–1968), American musician
- Luke Roberts (cyclist) (born 1977), Australian cyclist
- Luke Roberts (actor) (born 1977), English actor
- Lynette Roberts, British poet
- Lynn Roberts, American big band singer
- Lynne Roberts, American actress
- Lynne Roberts (basketball), American basketball coach

== M ==
- Marcus Roberts, American jazz pianist
- Margaret Roberts, several people
- Marietta Roberts, Canadian politician
- Mark Roberts (disambiguation), several people including:
  - Mark Roberts (streaker), English streaker
  - Mark Roberts (singer), British singer and guitarist
  - Mark Roberts (Australian footballer), Australian Football League player
- Mary Roberts (disambiguation), several people including
  - Mary Roberts (bodybuilder), professional female bodybuilder
  - Mary Fanton Roberts, American journalist
- Matana Roberts, American jazz saxophonist
- Matt Roberts, British sports presenter
- Matthew Roberts (disambiguation), several people
- Meirion Roberts (1934–2025), Welsh international rugby union player
- Mervyn Roberts, Welsh composer
- Michael Roberts (disambiguation), several people including:
  - Michael Roberts (writer), English poet, writer, critic and broadcaster
  - Michael Roberts (historian), English historian
  - Michael Roberts (footballer), Australian rules footballer
  - Michael Roberts (American football), American football player
  - Michael John Roberts, Canadian animator
- Michelle Roberts, Australian politician
- Mike Roberts (sports broadcaster), American sports broadcaster
- Monty Roberts, horse trainer
- Morganna Roberts, American baseball personality Morganna

== N ==
- Nancy Roberts (disambiguation), several people
- Nash Roberts (1918–2010), American meteorologist
- Neil Roberts (disambiguation), several people
- Nesta Roberts (1913–2009), Welsh journalist
- Nia Roberts (actress) (born 1972), Welsh actress
- Nia Roberts (presenter), Welsh radio and television presenter
- Nick Roberts (politician) (born 2000), American politician
- Nick Roberts (weightlifter) (born 1984), Canadian weightlifter
- Nickla Roberts (born 1962), American wrestling valet
- Nicola Roberts (born 1985), English pop singer, member of Girls Aloud
- Nicole Roberts (born 1973), American women's soccer player
- Nina Roberts, stage name of a French pornographic actress
- Niniwa Roberts (born 1976), New Zealand field hockey player
- Nora Roberts (born 1950), American romantic novelist
- Norman Roberts (1896–1980), British World War I flying ace

== O ==
- Obie Roberts, Bahamian politician
- Ollie P. Roberts, who claimed to be Billy the Kid
- Oral Roberts, American evangelist
- Oran M. Roberts, (1879–1883), governor of Texas
- Owen Josephus Roberts, Associate Justice of the United States Supreme Court

== P ==
- Paddy Roberts (disambiguation), several people
- Pat Roberts (born 1936), American politician
- Patricia Roberts Harris, American politician
- Patrice Roberts, Female soca singer of Trinidad and Tobago
- Paul Craig Roberts, American journalist
- Paul William Roberts, Canadian writer
- Pennant Roberts, British television director and producer
- Pernell Roberts, American actor
- Peter Scawen Watkinson Roberts, British Army officer
- Phil Roberts (born 1950), Welsh footballer
- Phillip Waipuldanya Roberts, Australian Aboriginal doctor
- Phyllis Roberts, British artist

== R ==
- Rachel Roberts (disambiguation), several people including
  - Rachel Roberts (actress)
  - Rachel Roberts (model)
- Ralph Roberts (disambiguation), several people including
  - Ralph J. Roberts, co-founder of Comcast Communications
  - Ralph J. Roberts (geologist), American geologist
  - Ralph Roberts (automotive designer) a car designer who worked for the Chrysler Corporation
  - Ralph R. Roberts (politician), 20th century US politician
- Rhoda Roberts (1959–2026), Australian actor and arts executive
- Rhydian Roberts, Welsh singer
- Richard Roberts (disambiguation), several people including:
  - Richard Roberts (engineer), British engineer
  - Richard J. Roberts, British biochemist
  - Richard Roberts (evangelist), American
- Rick Roberts (disambiguation), several people including
  - Rick Roberts (hockey player), Canadian field hockey player
  - Rick Roberts (actor), Canadian actor
  - Rick Roberts (musician), American rock musician
- Robert Roberts (disambiguation), several people including:
  - Robert Richford Roberts, American Methodist bishop
- Robin Roberts (disambiguation), several people including
  - Robin Roberts (baseball), baseball player
  - Robin Roberts (sportscaster), ABC Good Morning America anchor and former ESPN anchor
- Rod Roberts (American politician), Director of the Iowa Department of Inspection and Appeals and former state legislator
- Rev. Lord Roger Roberts, Baron Roberts of Llandudno, British Liberal Democrat Peer
- Roger Roberts, Baron Roberts of Llandudno, British politician
- Rollan Roberts, American politician
- Roy Roberts (disambiguation), several people including
  - Roy Roberts, American character actor
  - Roy 'Hog' Roberts, controversial inmate executed in Missouri
  - Roy Roberts (blues artist), North Carolina blues artist
- Russell Roberts, British comedian known as Russ Abbot
- Ryan Roberts (disambiguation), multiple people

== S ==
- Sailor Roberts, American poker player
- Sam Roberts (singer-songwriter), Canadian rock musician
- Samuel Roberts (disambiguation), multiple people
- Sandy Roberts, Australian sports broadcaster
- Sara Weeks Roberts, American social reformer and activist
- Sarah Roberts, Englishwoman said to be a vampire in Peru
- Sebastian Roberts, British Army general and educator
- Sheldon Roberts, American semiconductor pioneer
- Shevyn Roberts, American pop singer
- Siobhan Roberts, Canadian science journalist
- Sophie Roberts, New Zealand theatre director
- Stan Roberts, Canadian politician
- Stephen Roberts (disambiguation), several people
- Steven Roberts (disambiguation), several people
- Stuart Roberts (disambiguation), several people

== T ==
- Tanya Roberts, American actress
- Tecumsay Roberts, Liberian musician
- Terrell Roberts, American football player
- Terrence Roberts, one of the Little Rock Nine
- Terry Roberts (disambiguation), several people
- Thomas Roberts (disambiguation), several people including:
  - Thomas Roberts (footballer), English footballer who played for Bristol Rovers
  - Thomas Roberts (news anchor), American news anchor
  - Thomas J. "Long Tom" Roberts, fictional character, companion of Doc Savage
- Tiffany Roberts-Lovell, American politician
- Tom Roberts (disambiguation), several people
- Tommy Roberts (disambiguation), several people
- Tony Roberts (actor)
- Tony Roberts (footballer), Welsh (soccer) footballer
- Tracey Roberts (disambiguation), two people:
- Tracey Roberts (actress), American film and TV supporting performer
- Tracey Roberts (politician), Western Australian City of Wanneroo mayor
- Troy Roberts (disambiguation), multiple people
- Tyson R. Roberts, American ichthyologist

== V ==
- Veronica Roberts, British actress
- Virgil Roberts, American politician

== W ==
- Wayne Roberts (disambiguation)
- Wilfrid Roberts, British politician
- Will Roberts, Welsh painter
- William Roberts (disambiguation), several people including:
  - William Roberts (painter), vorticist painter of the early 20th century
  - William Roberts (physician), the first to discover, in 1874 that certain molds prevented bacterial growth
  - William Roberts (screenwriter)
  - William Roberts (veteran), British veteran of the First World War
  - William Roberts (Alberta politician), Alberta (Canada) Politician, NDP MLA
  - William R. Roberts, American politician
  - Rick Ross, American rapper, born William Leonard Roberts II
- Wilson Roberts (1770–1853), English politician
- Winifred Roberts, former name of British painter Winifred Nicholson

== X ==
- Xavier Roberts, American creator of Cabbage Patch Dolls

== Y ==
- Yvonne Roberts, English journalist

== Z ==
- Zizi Roberts, Liberian (soccer) football player
- Zoë Roberts, English stage actress and writer

== See also ==
- Lord Roberts (disambiguation)
- Baron Robartes (Roberts), (first creation) and Earl of Radnor (Robartes/Roberts family), English peerages created 1679
- Baron Robartes (Roberts), (second creation) and Viscount Clifden (Agar-Robartes family), English peerage created 1869
- Earl Roberts, United Kingdom peerage created in 1901
- Baron Clwyd (Roberts family), United Kingdom peerage created in 1919
- Wyn Roberts, Baron Roberts of Conwy (1930–2013), Welsh Conservative peer
- Roger Roberts, Baron Roberts of Llandudno (born 1935), Welsh Liberal Democrat peer
- Goronwy Roberts, Baron Goronwy-Roberts (1913–1981), Welsh Labour MP and peer
