= Arthur Roberts =

Arthur Roberts may refer to:

- Archie Roberts (American football) (born 1942), cardiac surgeon and American football player
- Arthur J. Roberts (1870–1956), 14th President of Colby College
- Arthur Roberts (British Army officer) (1870–1917)
- Arthur Roberts (comedian) (1852–1933), British music hall entertainer and actor
- Arthur Roberts (film editor) (1890–1961), American film editor
- Arthur Spencer Roberts (1920–1997), British wildlife painter
- Arthur Roberts (cricketer) (1874–1961), English cricketer
- Arthur Roberts (footballer, born 1876) (1876–?), English football player for Stoke
- Arthur Roberts (footballer, born 1907) (1907–1957), English football player
- Arthur Roberts (Australian footballer) (1911–1984), Australian rules footballer
- Arthur Roberts (physicist) (1912–2004), American physicist and composer

== See also ==
- Robert Arthur (disambiguation)
