= Frederick Roberts =

Frederick or Fred Roberts may refer to:

== Military ==
- Frederick Roberts, 1st Earl Roberts (1832–1914), British Army field marshal and Victoria Cross recipient
- Frederick Roberts (VC, born 1872) (1872–1899), British Army officer and Victoria Cross recipient, son of the above
- Fred Roberts, British soldier and editor of the First World War trench newspaper The Wipers Times
- Fred Roberts (RAF officer) (1913–1996), British Royal Air Force officer and cricketer

== Politics ==
- Frederick Roberts (British politician) (1876–1941), British Labour Party Member of Parliament, 1918–1931, 1935–1941
- Frederick Madison Roberts (1879–1952), first African-American elected to the California State Assembly

== Science ==
- Fred C. Roberts (1862–1894), English physician and medical missionary
- Fred S. Roberts (born 1943), American mathematician
- Fred M. Roberts, American botanist and underwater photographer

== Sports ==
=== American football ===
- Fred Roberts (American football coach) (1875–1959), American football coach of the Oklahoma Sooners
- Fred Roberts (American football guard) (1907–1982), American football player for Iowa Hawkeyes and Portsmouth Spartans

=== Association football ===
- Fred Roberts (footballer, born 1905) (1905–1988), Northern Irish footballer
- Fred Roberts (footballer, born 1909) (1909–1979), English football forward for Birmingham and Luton Town
- Fred Roberts (footballer, born 1916) (1916-1985), Welsh footballer, see List of Bury F.C. players (1–24 appearances)

=== Cricket ===
- Frederick Roberts (cricketer, born 1848) (1848–1903), English cricketer for Surrey
- Frederick Roberts (cricketer, born 1862) (1862–1936), English cricketer for Gloucestershire
- Frederick Roberts (cricketer, born 1881) (1881–?), English cricketer for Somerset

=== Other sports ===
- Fred Roberts (baseball) (1873–?), American baseball player
- Fred Roberts (rugby union) (1881–1956), New Zealand rugby union footballer for The Original All Blacks
- Fred Roberts (born 1960), American basketball player

== Others ==
- Fred L. Roberts (1899–1976), American businessman, founder of Roberts Public Markets, Los Angeles
