= General Roberts =

General Roberts may refer to:

- Abraham Roberts (1784–1873), British East India Company general
- Arthur Roberts (British Army officer) (1870-1917), British Army brigadier general
- Benjamin S. Roberts (1810–1875), Union Army brevet major general
- Carson Abel Roberts (1905–1983), U.S. Marine Corps lieutenant general
- Charles DuVal Roberts (1873–1966), U.S. Army brigadier general
- Frank Crowther Roberts (1891–1982), British Army major general
- Frederick Roberts, 1st Earl Roberts (1832–1914), British Army general
- John Hamilton Roberts (1891–1962), Canadian Army major general
- John W. Roberts (1921–1999), U.S. Air Force general
- Ouvry Lindfield Roberts (1898–1986), British Army general
- Philip Roberts (British Army officer) (1906–1997), British Army major general
- Sebastian Roberts (1954–2023), British Army major general
- William Paul Roberts (1841–1910), Confederate States Army brigadier general

== See also ==
- Len Roberts-Smith (born 1946), Australian Defence Force major general
- Attorney General Roberts (disambiguation)
