= Amabel =

Amabel is a female given name from Latin amabilis 'lovable'. Notable people with this name include:

- Amabel Anderson Arnold (1883–1936), American lawyer
- Amabel Hume-Campbell, 1st Countess de Grey (1751–1833), British diarist and political writer
- Lady Amabel Kerr (1846–1906), English writer
- Amabel Scharff Roberts (1891–1918), American nurse
- Amabel Williams-Ellis (1894–1984), English writer, critic
