= Roberts family =

Roberts family may refer to:

- List of people with surname Roberts
  - Roberts (surname)
- Earl Roberts, a title in the Peerage of the United Kingdom
- Baron Clwyd, a title in the Peerage of the United Kingdom created for John Roberts
