= Lord Robertson =

Lord Robertson may refer to:

- Patrick Robertson, Lord Robertson (1794–1855), Scottish judge
- James Robertson, Baron Robertson (1845–1909), Scottish judge, Conservative politician
- George Robertson, Baron Robertson of Port Ellen (born 1946), Labour politician, Secretary General of NATO in 1999–2003
- Ian Robertson, Lord Robertson (1912–2005) TD, Senator of the College of Justice in Scotland, 1966–1987, chairman of the Merchiston Board of governors, 1970–1996

== See also ==
- Lord Roberts (disambiguation)
