= Ian Roberts =

Ian Roberts may refer to:

- Ian Roberts (American actor) (born 1965), American actor and comedian
- Ian Roberts (Australian footballer) (born 1957), Australian rules footballer
- Ian Roberts (educator) (born 1973), Guyanese-American school superintendent, former athlete
- Ian Roberts (cricketer) (born 1948), English cricketer
- Ian Roberts (equestrian) (born 1958), Canadian equestrian events Olympian
- Ian Roberts (footballer, born 1961), Welsh association footballer
- Ian Roberts (linguist) (born 1957), professor of linguistics at the University of Cambridge
- Ian Roberts (painter) (born 1952), Australian bird and native vegetation painter
- Ian Roberts (physician) (born 1962 or 1963), Formula One medical delegate
- Ian Roberts (rugby league) (born 1965), Australian actor and rugby league player, known for being the first openly gay rugby league player
- Ian Roberts (South African actor) (born 1952), South African actor, playwright and singer
- Ian Lea Roberts, stand-up comedian and after-dinner speaker

== See also ==
- Kwame Kwei-Armah (born 1967 with the name Ian Roberts), British actor, playwright, singer and broadcaster
