= Francis Roberts (disambiguation) =

Francis Roberts (1609–1675) was an English clergyman.

Francis Roberts may also refer to:

- Francis H. Roberts (1784–1809), servant of the East India Company
- Francis Roberts (cricketer) (1882–1916), English cricketer
- Frank Roberts (boxer) (Francis Roy Roberts, 1945–2011), the first indigenous Australian Olympian
- Francis Roberts (MP), member of parliament for Bishop's Castle in 1621

== See also ==
- Frank Roberts (disambiguation)
- Thomas Francis Roberts (1860–1919), Welsh academic
- Francis Robartes (d.1718), Member of Parliament
