= Jean Roberts =

Jean Roberts may refer to:

- Jean Roberts (athlete)
- Jean Roberts (politician)

== See also ==
- Gene Roberts (disambiguation)
- Jean-Marc Roberts, French editor, novelist, and screenwriter.
