= Nurse Roberts =

Nurse Roberts may refer to:

- Amabel Scharff Roberts (1891–1918), American nurse
- Eliza Roberts (nurse) (1802–1878), British nurse of the Crimean War
- Laverne Roberts, a fictional character in the sitcom Scrubs
