= Elizabeth Roberts =

Elizabeth Roberts may refer to:

- Elizabeth Ann Roberts (born 1941), American model
- Elizabeth H. Roberts (born 1957), former Rhode Island lieutenant governor
- Elizabeth Madox Roberts (1881–1941), Kentucky novelist and poet
- Elizabeth Roberts (murder victim) (1959–1977), American murder victim unidentified for 43 years
- Elizabeth Wentworth Roberts (1871–1927), American painter

== See also ==
- Betty Roberts (1923–2011), American politician from Oregon
- Eliza Roberts (disambiguation)
- Liz Saville Roberts (born 1964), Welsh member of parliament
