= R. Roberts =

R. Roberts may refer to:

- R. Roberts (Lancashire cricketer), English cricketer

== See also ==
- List of people with surname Roberts § R
