= Ann Roberts =

Ann(e) Roberts may refer to:

- Ann Clwyd (1937–2023), married name Roberts, Welsh politician
- Anne Roberts, Canadian journalism teacher and city councillor
- Anne C. Roberts, American interventional radiologist
- Anne Mason Roberts (1910–1971), American government official
- Ann Rockefeller Roberts (1934–2024), American native American activist
- Ann Roberts (umpire), cricket umpire for Australian women's cricket team in England in 2005
- Ann Roberts (producer), produced Adopted (film)

== See also ==
- Anna Roberts (born 1957), Canadian politician
- Sally-Ann Roberts, TV anchor
- Elizabeth Ann Roberts, American model
- Roberts (surname)
