= Frank Roberts =

Frank Roberts may refer to:

== Politics and diplomacy ==
- Frank Roberts (Australian politician) (1913–1992), Lord Mayor of Brisbane
- Frank Roberts (diplomat) (1907–1998), British diplomat
- Frank L. Roberts (1915–1993), American politician

== Sport ==
- Frank Roberts (Australian footballer) (1912–1989), Australian rules footballer
- Frank Roberts (boxer) (1945–2011), Aboriginal Australian boxer who competed at the Tokyo Olympics in 1964
- Frank Roberts (footballer, born 1893) (1893–1961), English footballer

== Others ==
- Frank Roberts (model maker) (1882–1963), New Zealand model maker
- Frank Roberts (pastor), Aboriginal Australian pastor, leader of Cubawee self-governing reserve
- Frank Roberts Jnr, son of the pastor, activist at the Aboriginal Tent Embassy in 1972
- Frank Crowther Roberts (1891–1982), British Army officer, recipient of the Victoria Cross
- Frank H. H. Roberts (1897–1966), American archaeologist and anthropologist
- Frank Leon Roberts (born 1982), American activist, writer and college professor

== See also ==
- Francis Roberts (disambiguation)
- Robert Franks (disambiguation)
- Robert Frank (disambiguation)
