= Stuart Roberts =

Stuart Roberts may refer to:

- Stu Roberts (born 1965), former New Zealand cricketer
- Stuart Roberts (footballer, born 1967), Welsh footballer for Stoke City
- Stuart Roberts (footballer, born 1980), Welsh footballer
- Stuart Roberts (swimmer) (born 1951), British Olympic swimmer
