= Jane Roberts (disambiguation) =

Jane Roberts (1929–1984) was an American author, poet and spirit medium

Jane Roberts may also refer to:

- Jane Roberts (died 1684), alias for the highwayrobber Jane Voss
- Jane Roberts (author) (1792 – after 1861), English author
- Jane Roberts (first lady) (c. 1819–1914), First Lady of Liberia
- Jane Roberts (politician) (born 1955), British psychiatrist and Labour Party politician
- Jane Roberts (literary scholar), Northern Irish literary scholar
- Jane Roberts (librarian) (1949–2021), Royal Librarian
- Jane Sullivan Roberts, wife of John Roberts
