= Rick Roberts =

Rick Roberts may refer to:

- Rick Roberts (actor) (born 1965), Canadian actor
- Rick Roberts (executive producer), American film producer
- Rick Roberts (field hockey) (born 1967), Canadian field hockey player
- Rick Roberts (musician) (born 1949), American rock musician, founder of Firefall
- Rick Roberts (radio personality), American radio talk show host

== See also ==
- Dick Roberts (disambiguation)
- Richard Roberts (disambiguation)
