= Kenneth Roberts =

Kenneth Roberts, or Kenny Roberts or Ken Roberts may refer to:

== Sportspeople ==
- Ken Roberts (footballer, born 1925) (1925–2008), Australian rules footballer for Richmond
- Ken Roberts (footballer, born 1936) (1936–2021), Welsh football player and manager
- Ken Roberts (footballer, born 1952), Australian rules footballer for Essendon and Melbourne
- Ken Roberts (rugby league) (1937–2017), English rugby league footballer of the 1950s, 1960s and 1970s
- Ken Roberts (baseball) (born 1988), baseball player
- Kenny Roberts (born 1951), former world champion motorcycle racer
- Kenny Roberts Jr. (born 1973), former world champion motorcycle racer and son of Kenny Roberts
- Kenny Roberts (swimmer) (born 1978), Seychellois swimmer

== Writers ==
- Ken Roberts (author) (born 1946), Canadian children's writer
- Kenneth Roberts (author) (1885–1957), American author of historical novels

== Politicians ==
- Kenneth A. Roberts (1912–1989), U.S. Representative from Alabama
- Ken Roberts (politician) (born 1963), Republican Idaho State Representative
- Kenneth Roberts (Wyoming politician), Republican Wyoming State Representative

== Others ==
- Ken Roberts (announcer) (1910–2009), American radio and television announcer
- Kenneth Roberts (political scientist), American political scientist
- Ken Roberts (promoter) (1941–2014), concert promoter and owner of influential Los Angeles radio station KROQ-FM
- Kenny Roberts (musician) (1926–2012), country music performer
