= Connor Roberts =

Connor Roberts may refer to:

- Connor Roberts (footballer, born 1992), Welsh footballer
- Connor Roberts (footballer, born 1995), Wales international footballer
