= Lawrence Roberts =

Lawrence or Larry Roberts may refer to:

- Larry Roberts (computer scientist) (1937–2018), one of the "fathers" of the Internet
- Lawrence Roberts (basketball) (born 1982), American professional basketball player
- Lawrence Roberts (politician) (born 1941), Pennsylvania politician
- Lawrence A. Roberts (1928–2014), member of the Florida House of Representatives
- Lawrence E. Roberts (1922–2004), pilot with the Tuskegee Airmen
- Larry Roberts (actor) (1926–1992), American actor
- Larry Roberts (American football) (1963–2016), American football player
- Lawrence Roberts (athlete) (1903–1977), South African track and field athlete
- Lawrence Roberts (footballer), Scottish footballer
- Larry Roberts (Oklahoma politician) (1946–2017), American politician
- C. Larry Roberts (1944–1988), American filmmaker
