= Ralph Roberts =

Ralph Roberts may refer to:

- Ralph J. Roberts (1920–2015), American businessman, co-founder of Comcast Communications
- Ralph J. Roberts (geologist) (1911–2007), American geologist
- Ralph Roberts (automotive designer), car designer who worked for the Chrysler Corporation
- Ralph R. Roberts (1897–1981), Doorkeeper of the United States House of Representatives, c. 1944–1947
- Ralph Arthur Roberts (1884–1940), German film actor
- Ralph Roberts (sailor) (1935–2023), New Zealand sailor
- Ralph Roberts (author), contributor to Alternate Presidents
- Ralph Roberts, a fictional character from Stephen King's novel Insomnia
