= Andy Roberts =

Andy Roberts may refer to:

- Andy Roberts (cricketer) (born 1951), West Indian former cricketer
- Andy Roberts (footballer) (born 1974), retired English footballer
- Andy Roberts (musician) (born 1946), English musician
- Andy Roberts (New Zealand cricketer) (1947–1989), New Zealand cricketer
- Andy Roberts (singer) (1926–2017), American jazz singer
- Andy Roberts (racquetball), played in US Open Racquetball Championships
- Andy Roberts, English singer-songwriter and guitarist with Linus (band)

== See also ==
- Andrew Roberts (disambiguation)
- Roberts (surname)
