= Danny Roberts =

Danny Roberts may refer to:

- Danny Roberts (Australian actor) (born 1966)
- Danny Roberts (fighter) (born 1987), British mixed martial artist
- Danny Roberts (media personality) (born 1977), appeared on The Real World: New Orleans in 2000

== See also ==
- Daniel Roberts (disambiguation)
