= Thomas Roberts =

Thomas, Tommy or Tom Roberts may refer to:

== Arts and entertainment ==
- Thomas Roberts (painter) (1749–1778), Irish landscape painter
- Thomas Sautelle Roberts (c. 1760–1826), brother of the above, Irish landscape artist
- Thomas Roberts (radical writer) (1765/6–1841), Welsh writer and pamphleteer
- Tom Roberts (1856–1931), Australian artist
- Thomas J. "Long Tom" Roberts (fl. 1930s), fictional literary character, companion of Doc Savage
- Tommy Roberts (designer) (1942–2012), English designer and fashion entrepreneur
- Tom Roberts (journalist) (born c. 1950), Canadian radio host
- Thomas Roberts (television journalist) (born 1972), American news anchor
- Tom Roberts (director) (fl. 2000s), director of the film In Transit

== Law and politics ==
- Sir Thomas Roberts, 4th Baronet (1658–1706), English MP
- Thomas Robert Roberts (1869–1934), English-born Australian politician in Queensland
- Thomas H. Roberts (1902–1976), American judge
- Tommy Ed Roberts (1940–2014), American politician and businessman
- Tom Roberts (Ohio politician) (born 1952), American politician in Ohio Senate and Ohio House of Representatives
- Tom Roberts (Nevada politician) (born 1964), American politician in Nevada
- Thomas Roberts (Illinois politician), member of the Illinois Senate

== Sports ==
=== Association football (soccer) ===
- Tommy Roberts (footballer, born 1898) (1898–1965), English footballer
- Thomas Roberts (footballer) (1903–?), English footballer for Bristol Rovers
- Tommy Roberts (footballer, born 1927) (1927–2001), English footballer
- Thomas Roberts (soccer) (born 2001), American soccer player

=== Other sports ===
- Thomas Roberts (cricketer) (1880–1976), Barbadian cricketer
- Tom Roberts (rugby union) (1897–1972), Welsh international rugby union player and coal miner
- Tom Roberts (American football) (1916–1990), American football player
- Tommy Roberts (sports broadcaster) (1928–2024), American sports radio and TV broadcaster

== Others ==
- Murder of Thomas Roberts, 2022 murder
- Thomas Paschall Roberts (1843–1924), American civil engineer and surveyor
- Thomas Sadler Roberts (1858–1946), American physician and ornithologist
- Thomas Francis Roberts (1860–1919), Welsh academic and second principal of the University College of Wales Aberystwyth
- Thomas Roberts (bishop) (1893–1976), Roman Catholic archbishop of Bombay
- T. J. Roberts (ornithologist) (Thomas Jones Roberts, 1924–2013), British ornithologist and authority on Pakistani wildlife

== See also ==
- Thomas Robarts (1568–1633), English politician
