= Mary Roberts =

Mary Roberts may refer to:

- Mary Roberts (author) (1788–1864), English author
- Mary Roberts (bodybuilder) (born 1950), American former professional female bodybuilder
- Mary Roberts (painter) (?–1761), American first female miniaturist in the American colonies
- Mary Roberts (poet), see 1822 in poetry
- Mary Roberts Rinehart (1876–1958), née Roberts, American author
- Mary Roberts (1906–2019), Canadian supercentenarian
- Mary Fanton Roberts (1864–1956), American journalist
- Mary Grant Roberts (1841–1921), Australian zoo owner
- Mary Helen Roberts (born 1947), American politician in the state of Washington
- Mary Louise Roberts (physiotherapist) (1886–1968), New Zealand masseuse, physiotherapist, and mountaineer
- Mary Louise Roberts (historian), American historian
- Mary May Roberts (1877–1959), American nurse
- Mary Wendy Roberts (born 1944), American politician in the state of Oregon
- Mary Roberts Coolidge (1860–1945), née Roberts, American sociologist and author
- Cokie Roberts (1943–2019), real name Mary Roberts, American journalist and author
