= Albert Roberts =

Albert, Alby or Bert Roberts may refer to:

== Politicians ==
- Albert H. Roberts (1868–1946), American politician who served as Governor of Tennessee
- Albert Roberts (British politician) (1908–2000), English MP for Normanton in West Yorkshire

== Sports competitors ==
- Bert Roberts, English rugby footballer (1914–15 Northern Rugby Football Union season#Challenge Cup)
- Alby Roberts (1909–1978), New Zealand Test cricketer

== Others ==
- Bert Roberts (1878–1964), Australian coachbuilder with interest in photography
- Bert Roberts, Australian Laureate Fellow (List of University of Wollongong people#Staff)
- Bert Roberts, American business executive (David Gorodyansky#Influence and Internet Philosophy)

== See also ==
- Bartholomew Roberts (1682–1722), Welsh pirate notorious as "Black Bart"
- Bart Roberts, early stage name of American actor Rex Reason (1928–2015)
- Robert Alberts (born 1954), Dutch footballer and manager
