= Eugene Roberts =

Eugene Roberts may refer to:

- Eugene L. Roberts (1880–1953), American athletics coach
- Eugene Roberts (neuroscientist) (1920–2016), American neuroscientist
- Gene Roberts (American football) (Eugene O. Roberts, 1923–2009), American professional football player
- Gene Roberts (journalist) (Eugene Leslie Roberts Jr., born 1932), American journalist

== See also ==
- Gene Roberts (disambiguation)
