= Ada Palmer Roberts =

American poet

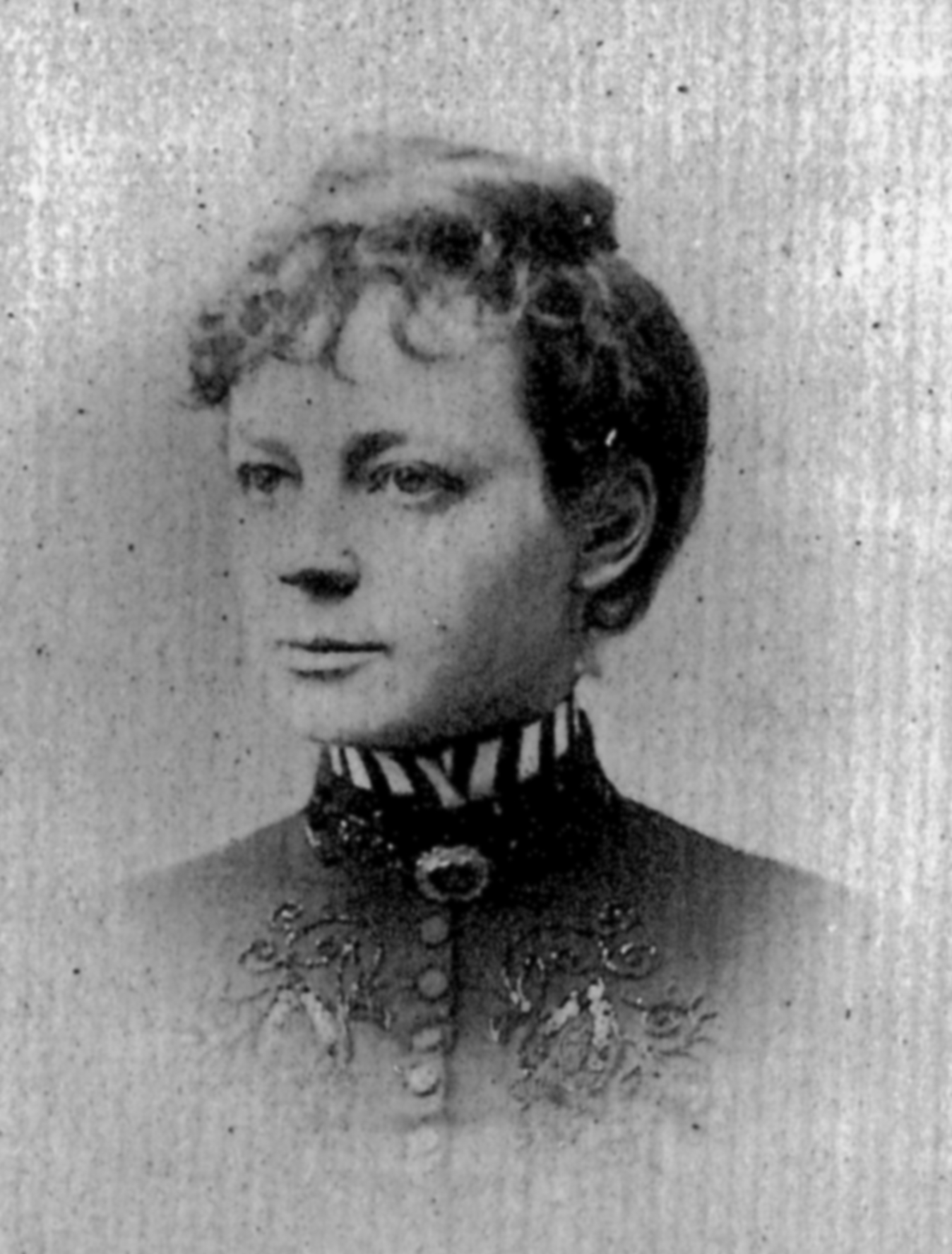
- Photo portrait from A Woman of the Century
- Born: February 14, 1852; North East, New York
- Died: Unknown

Ada Palmer Roberts (February 14, 1852 – ?) was an American poet.

== Early life ==
Roberts was born in North East, New York, February 14, 1852. Her father, Elijah Palmer, was a lawyer who also wrote poetry. His satirical poems, many of which were impromptu, did much to make him popular as a lawyer. From her, father Roberts inherited poetical talent and received most of her early education, as her delicate health would not permit her to be a regular attendant in school.

== Career ==
When she was sixteen years old, her education was sufficient for her to teach a private school, her pupils having been her former playmates.

Her poetical productions was not intended for publication, but came from her love of writing. She published but few poems, and some of them found a place in prominent periodicals, the Youth's Companion, the New York Christian Weekly and others. "Trailing Arbutus" and "Harbingers of Spring" received special attention from the press, and appeared in a number of weekly papers.

== Personal life ==
She was married on January 31, 1878, and household duties, maternal cares and recurring ill health kept her from doing regular literary work. She lived in Oxford, Connecticut.
