= Bert Roberts =

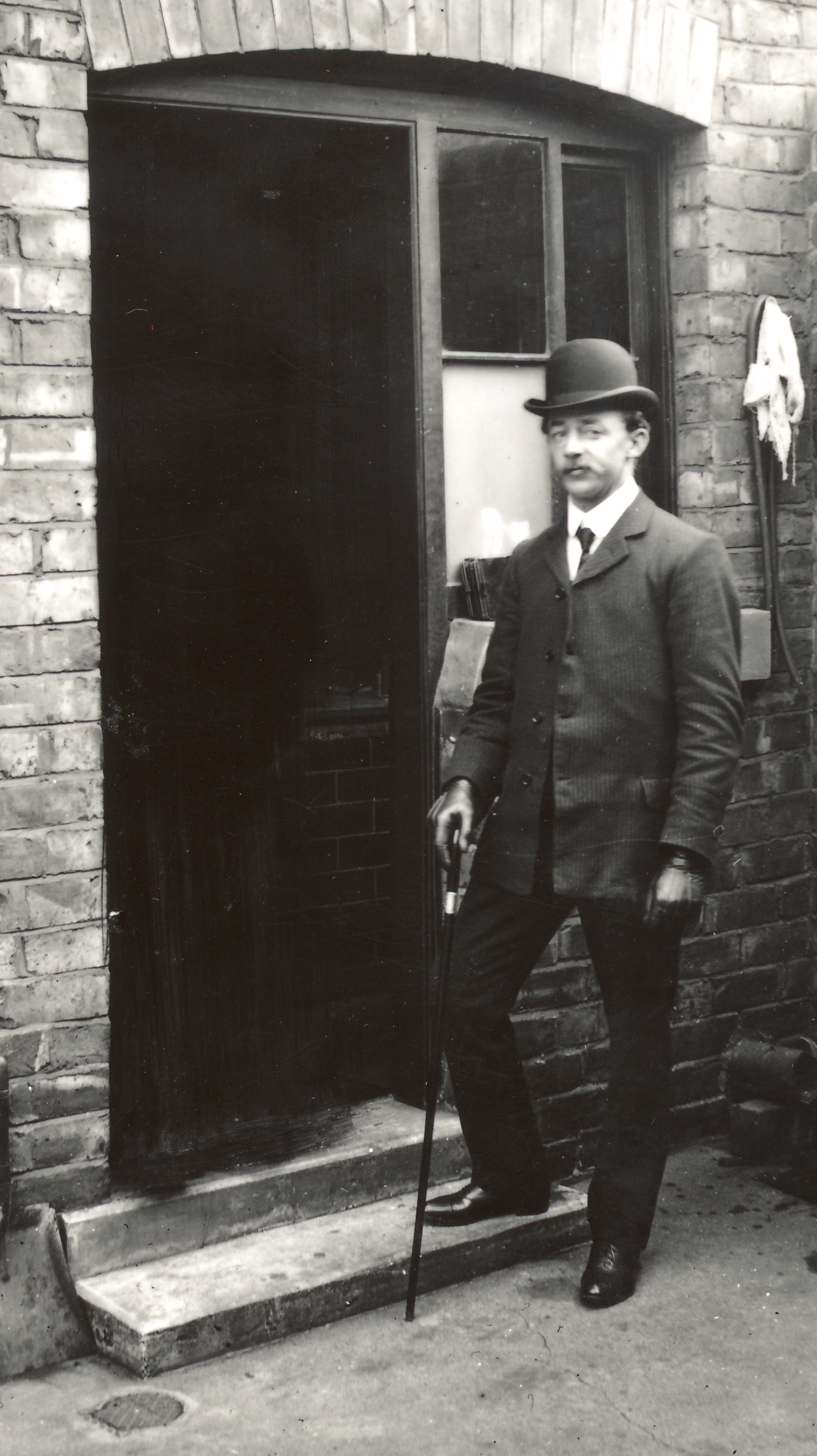
Bert Roberts

Albert Edwin Roberts (26 February 1878 – 24 July 1964) was an Australian photographer and coachbuilder. A renaissance man, born in Birmingham, England, he was interested in a wide range of subjects, and took many photographs of everyday life around Ipswich in the early 20th century.

== Photography ==
One of Roberts' main interests was photography. Upon his death in Ipswich at the age of 86, a large number of photographic plates he created found its way into the collection of the Queensland Museum. Prints based on these photos were the subject of public displays at the museum's Ipswich and Toowoomba campuses.

== Gallery ==
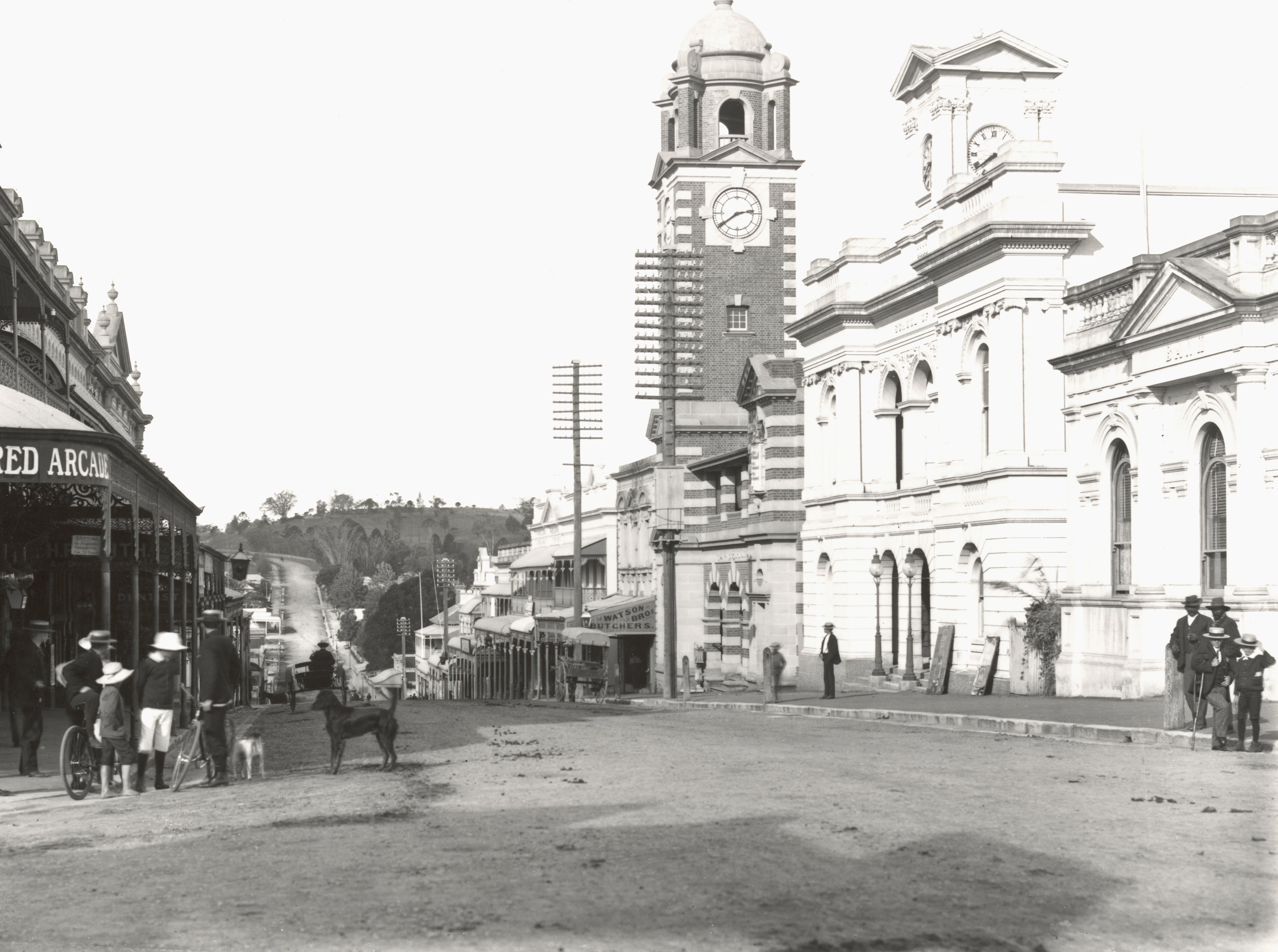

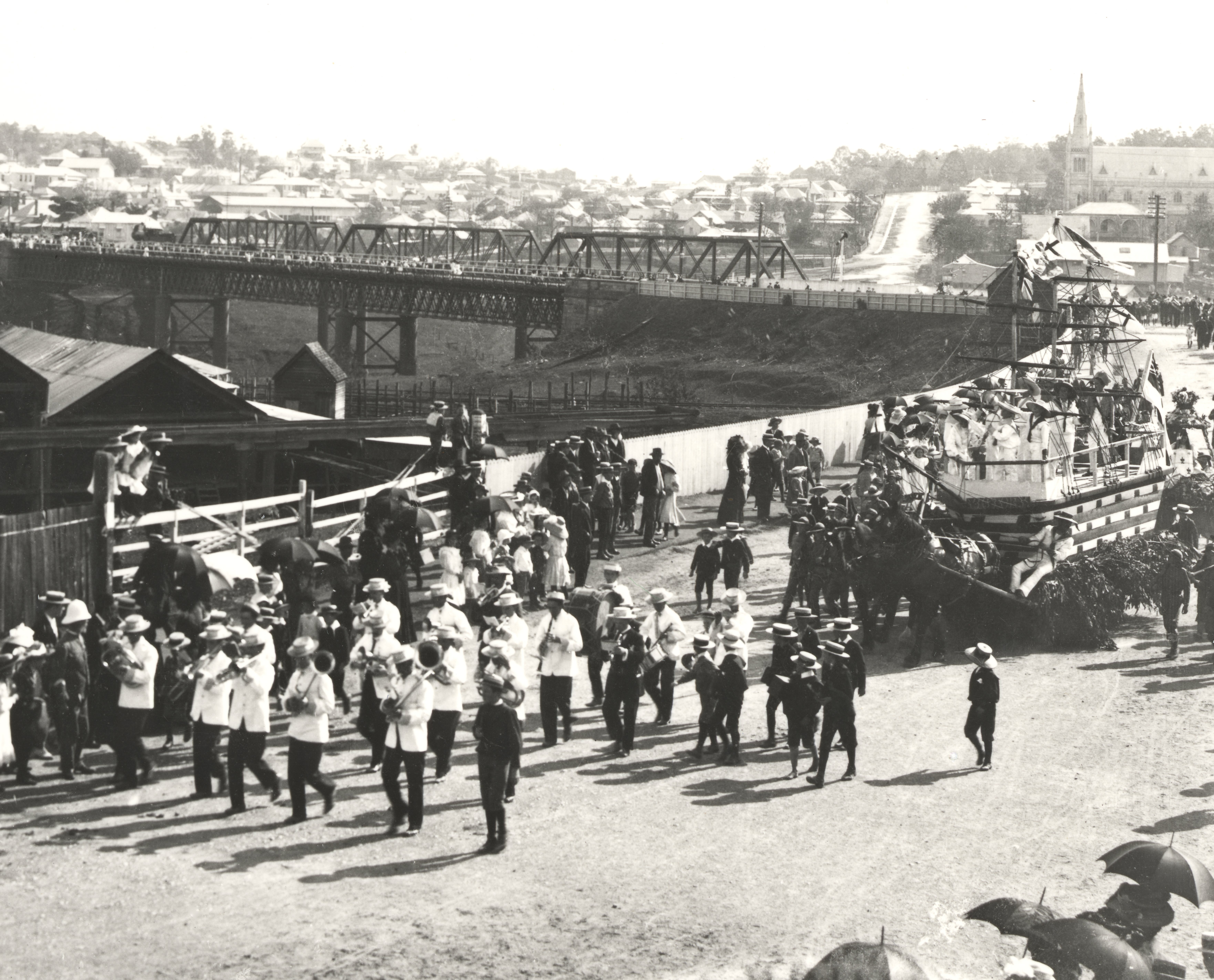

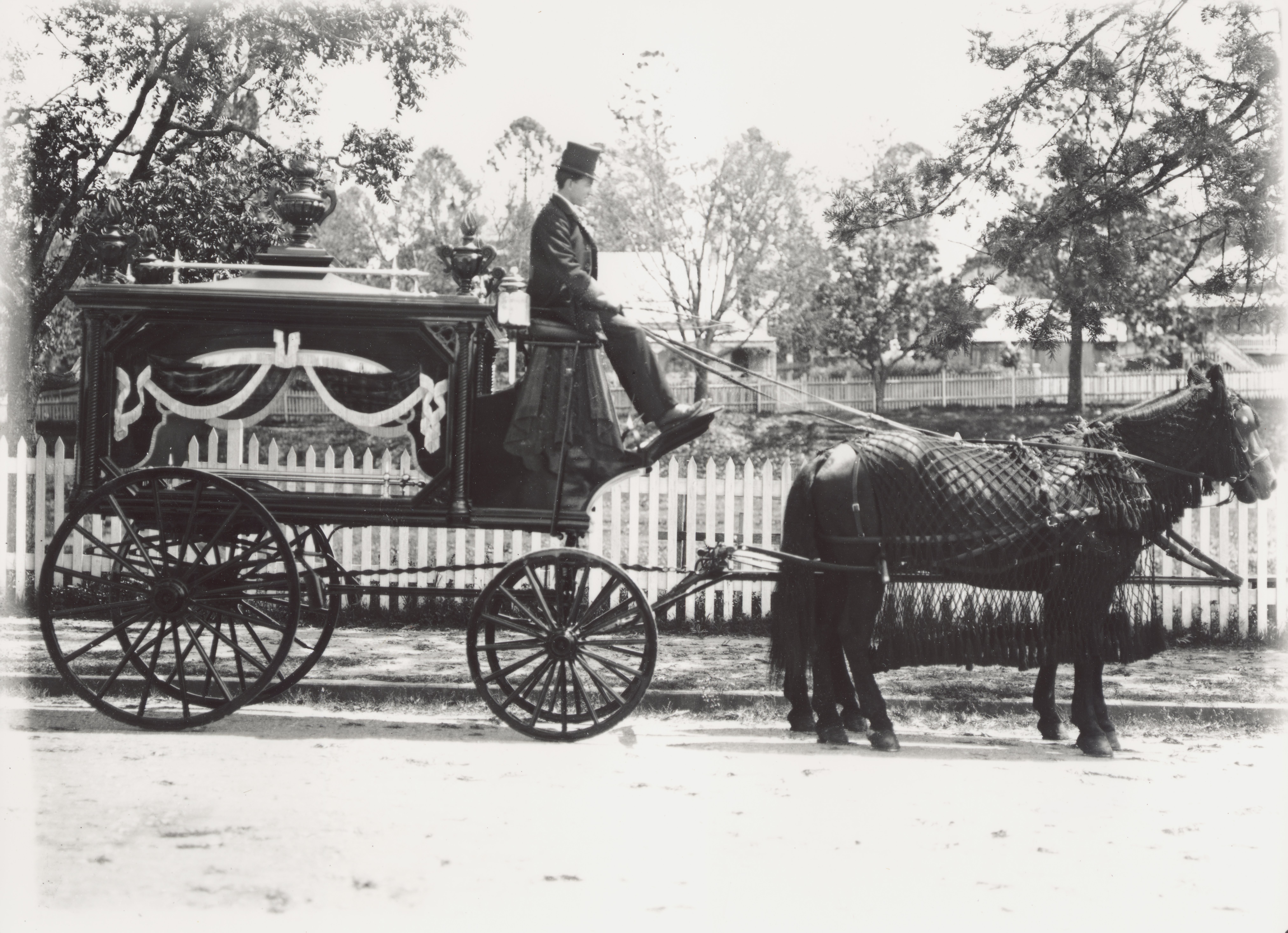

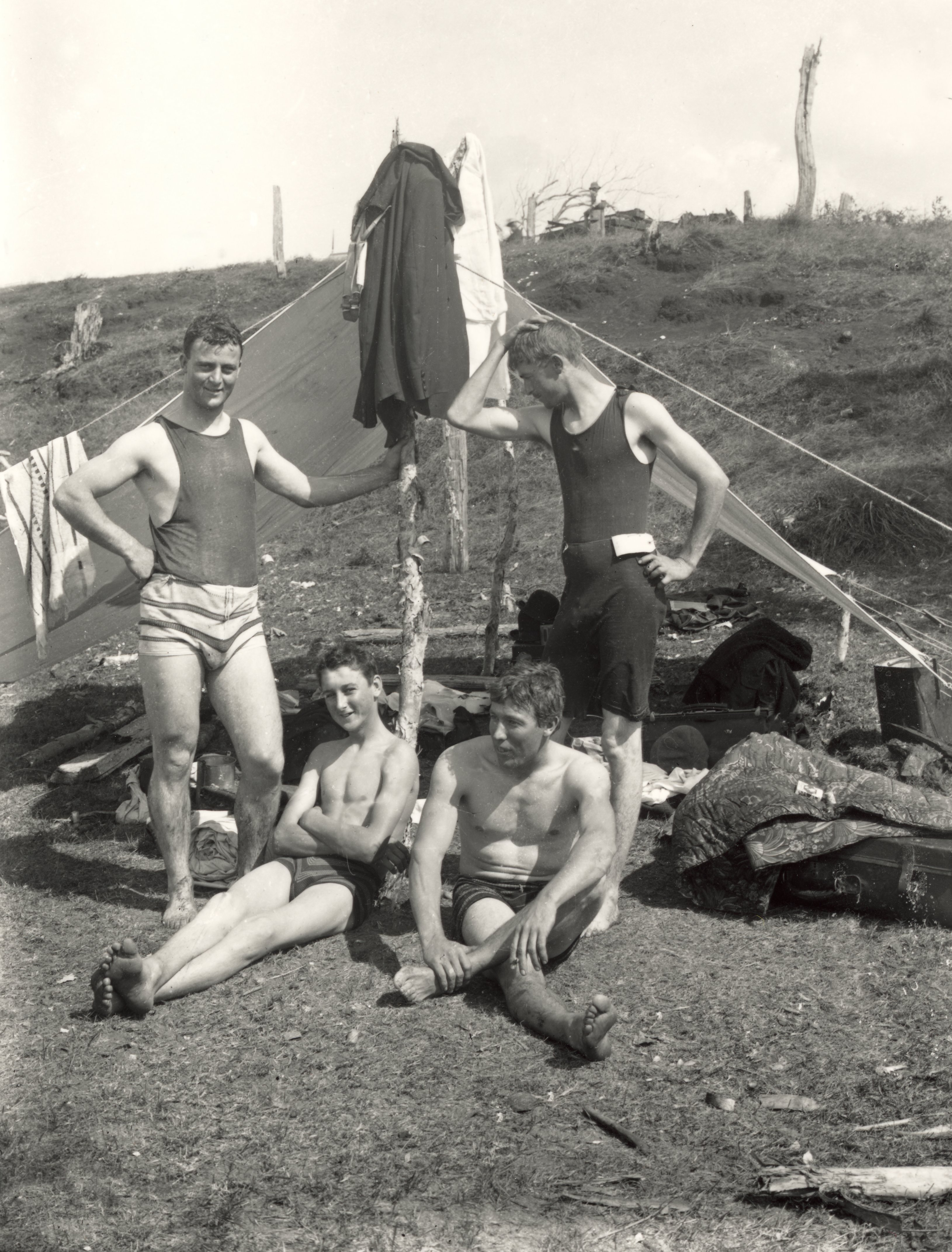

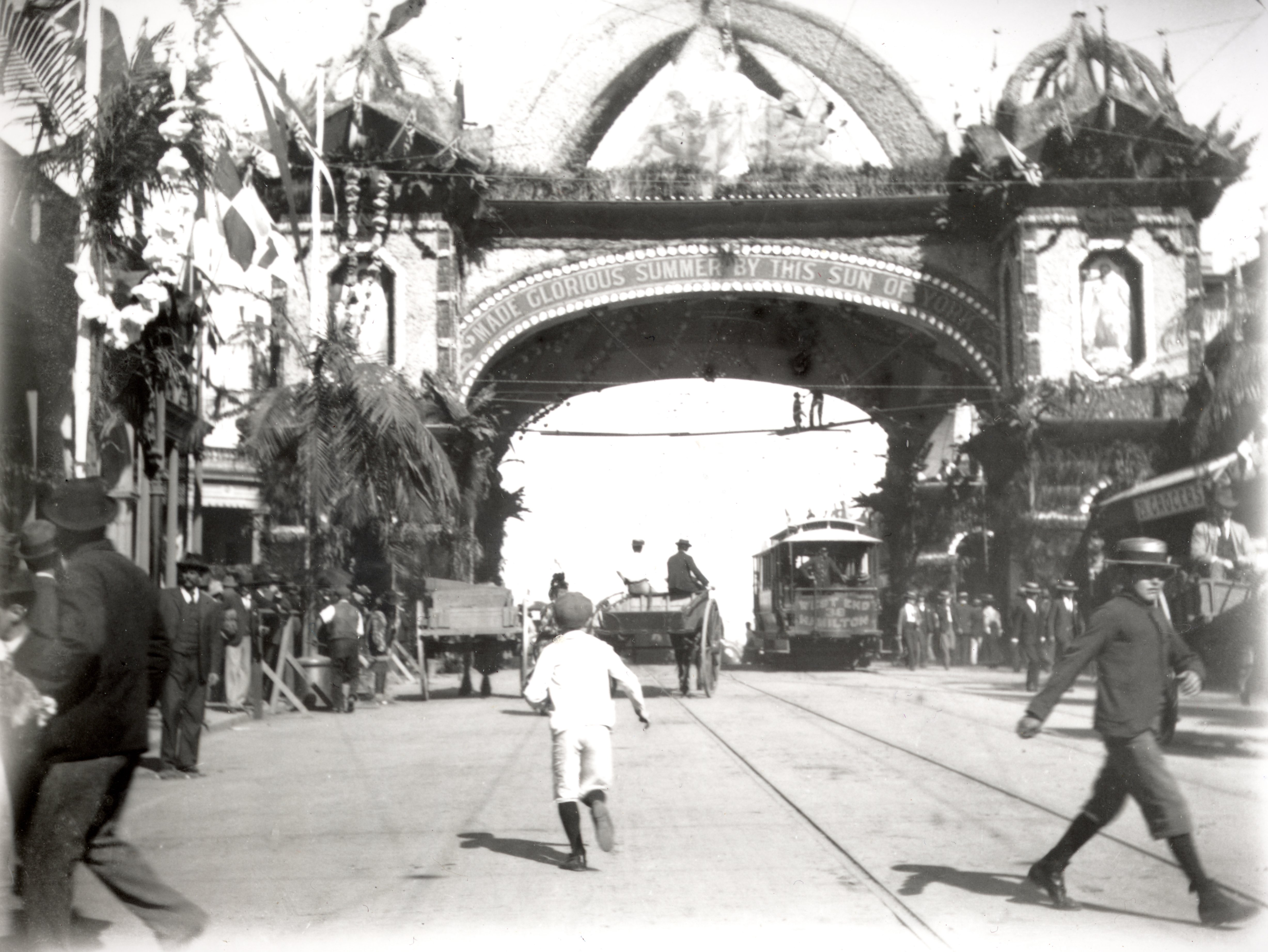

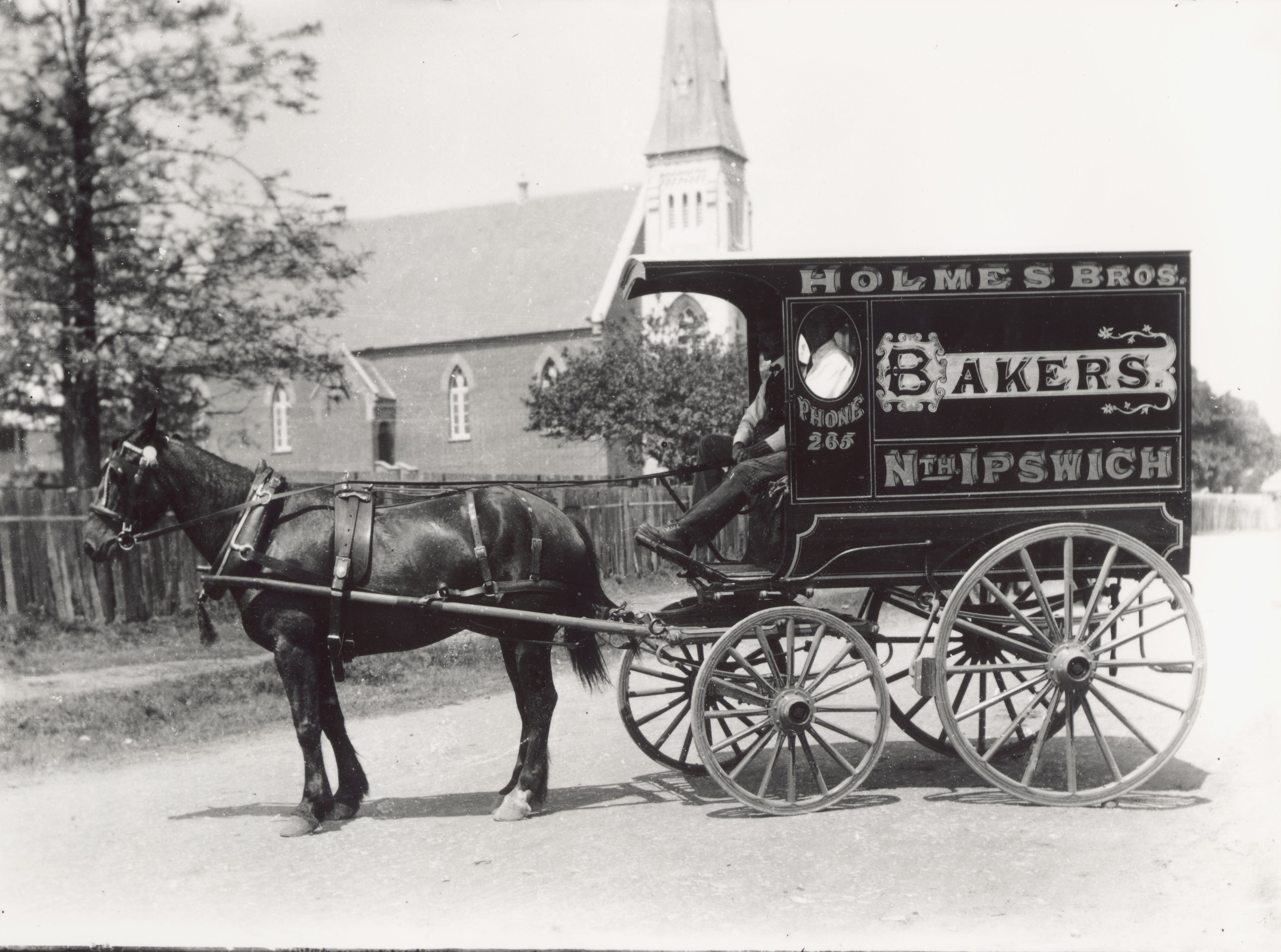

== See also ==
- Wikimedia Commons Category:A E "Bert" Roberts plate glass photo collection
