= Attorney General Roberts =

Attorney General Roberts may refer to:

- Charles B. Roberts (1842–1899), Attorney General of Maryland
- Denys Roberts (1923–2013), Attorney General of Hong Kong
- Kelso Roberts (1898–1970), Attorney General of Ontario
