= Alan Roberts =

Allen, Allan or Alan Roberts may refer to:

== Entertainment ==
- Allan Roberts (songwriter) (1905–1966), American lyricist for theatre and film
- Alan Roberts (1946–2001), Scottish singer/songwriter/guitarist
- Alan Roberts (filmmaker) (1946–2016), American cult film director and editor
- Alan Roberts (broadcaster) (born 1946), English radio presenter, producer and actor
- Alan Roberts, American voice actor on List of TaleSpin characters#Kit Cloudkicker during 1990s
- Jim Noir (Alan Peter Roberts, born 1982), English singer-songwriter

== Science ==
- Alan Roberts (environmentalist) (1925–2017), Australian theoretical physicist and environmentalist, active in the 1960s counter-culture
- Alan Clive Roberts (1934–2021), English consultant and clinical scientist
- Alan M. Roberts (born 1941), English electrophysiologist, neuroanatomist and academic
- Alan D. Roberts, English physicist and chemist active since 1960s

== Sports ==
- Allen Roberts (1922–2015), New Zealand cricketer for Auckland
- Alan Roberts (footballer) (born 1964), English right winger during 1980s
- Allen Roberts, American guard with 2009–10 Miami RedHawks men's basketball team#Roster
- Alan Roberts (diver) (born 1938), English born, Welsh diver
- Alan Roberts (rugby union)

== Other ==
- Alan Roberts (1925–2017), Australian Marxist in Eco-socialism#1970s–1990s: rise of environmentalism and engagement with Marxism and socialism
- Allan Roberts (politician) (1943–1990), English MP for Bootle
- Allen D. Roberts (born 1947), American editor of Sunstone (magazine)#Editors and publishers

== See also ==
- Alan Robert (born 1971), American singer/songwriter and comic book creator
- Al Roberts (born 1944), American football coach in Seattle
- Al Roberts (One Life to Live), character on American daytime serial (1986–2011); a/k/a Cord Roberts
