= Rick Roberts (executive producer) =

American film producer

Rick Roberts is a documentary producer and communications consultant. During his career in human services and non profit management he has received a White House "Point of Light" award and was named a "Chicagoan of the Year".

In 1988 Roberts became the 6th Executive Director of the Chicago Christian Industrial League.

In 1995 Rick created his own production company Horizons Communications Group Through this company Roberts has produced several documentaries. Horizons Communications Group is also responsible for producing several PSAs and videos for non-for profits. Clients include: Access to Care, America's Film Fund, America's Second Harvest, Brothers of the Poor of St. Francis, CEDA, Center for Religious Architecture, The Salvation Army, Chicago Public Schools, and Rotary International.
