= Jason Roberts =

Jason Roberts may refer to:

- Jason Roberts (author), American writer
- Jason Roberts (footballer) (born 1978), Grenadian football (soccer) player
- Jason Roberts (guitarist) (born 1982), American guitarist
- Jason Roberts (indie musician), member of indie pop band The Happy Bullets
- Jason Roberts, fiddler in country music group Asleep at the Wheel
- Jason Roberts (weightlifter), Australian weightlifter
- Jason Joseph Roberts, a Melbourne man accused of slaying two police officers in the Silk–Miller police murders in Victoria, Australia

== See also ==
- Jason Robards (1922–2000), American stage, film and television actor
- Jason Robards Sr. (1892–1963), American stage and screen actor
- Justin Roberts (born 1979), wrestling ring announcer, occasionally uses the name Jason Roberts
