= Hugh Roberts =

Hugh Roberts may refer to:

- Sir Hugh Roberts (art historian) (born 1948), British art historian
- Hugh Roberts (architect) (1867–1928), American architect
- Hugh Roberts (footballer) (1882–1969), Welsh footballer
- Hugh Roberts (politician) (born 1880), Welsh politician and trade unionist
- Hugh Roberts (soccer) (born 1992), American soccer player
- Hugh Beaver Roberts (1820–1903), Welsh solicitor and entrepreneur
