= Clint Roberts =

Clint Roberts may refer to:

- Clint Roberts (politician) (1935–2017), South Dakota politician
- Clint Roberts (broadcaster) (born 1987), New Zealand radio host
