= Nancy Roberts =

Nancy Roberts is the name of:

- Nancy Roberts (producer), American motion picture- and television producer and writer
- Nancy Roberts (author) (1924–2008), American writer and storyteller; often described as the "First Lady of American Folklore"
- Nancy N. Roberts (born 1957), American translator of Arabic literature
- Nancy Roberts, American actress, sister of Tony Roberts (actor)
- Nancy Roberts, British actress, known for The Grove Family
