= Connor Roberts (footballer, born 1992) =

Welsh footballer

Personal information
- Full name: Connor Stuart Roberts
- Date of birth: 8 December 1992 (age 33)
- Place of birth: Wrexham, Wales
- Position: Goalkeeper

Team information
- Current team: Caernarfon Town
- Number: 1

Youth career
- ?–2009: Tranmere Rovers
- 2009–2011: Everton

Senior career*
Years	Team	Apps	(Gls)
2011–2012	Everton	0	(0)
2011	→ Burscough (loan)	?	(?)
2012	→ Colwyn Bay (loan)	4	(0)
2012	→ Fulham (loan)	0	(0)
2012–2014	Cheltenham Town	1	(0)
2014–2015	Chester	0	(0)
2015–2018	Bangor City	85	(0)
2018–2025	The New Saints	66	(0)
2018	→ Llandudno (loan)	1	(0)
2019–2021	→ Aberystwyth Town (loan)	46	(0)
2025–	Caernarfon Town	40	(0)

International career^{‡}
2011–2012	Wales U19	4	(0)
2013–2014	Wales U21	6	(0)
2020–	Wales C	0	(0)
- * Club domestic league appearances and goals as of 08:22, 8 November 2026 (UTC) ‡ National team caps and goals as of 21:49, 19 May 2014 (UTC)

Connor Stuart Roberts (born 8 December 1992) is a Welsh professional footballer who plays as a goalkeeper for Cymru Premier side Caernarfon Town.

== Club career ==
=== Youth career ===
Roberts began his youth career on the books at his hometown club Chirk AAA FC before joining Tranmere Rovers at a relatively early age, then he was signed by Everton and would be part of the set up at Goodison Park for three years. In that time he was part of the development squads and Everton at both Under 18 and Under 21 levels. Roberts also featured in matches for the Everton XI alongside then youth players Ross Barkley and James Wallace but did not break through in similar fashion.

=== Burscough & Colwyn Bay loans ===
In 2011 Roberts was given the opportunity to gain first team experience at Northern Premier Division side Burscough. Upon his return to Everton he was granted another loan, this time to Conference North side Colwyn Bay. He made 4 appearances for the North Wales side in 2011 before returning once more to Merseyside. He was briefly loaned to Fulham and played for their U18 squad as he featured in the U18 Premier League Final at Craven Cottage in 2012.

=== Cheltenham Town ===
Although he signed his first professional contract with Everton in 2011, a season later Roberts joined Cheltenham Town in 2012 after being released by the Toffees. After a season at the Robins, Roberts failed to make an appearances, however he signed a new one-year contract in July 2013, keeping him at the club until the end of the 2013–14 season. On 3 May 2014, Roberts made his professional debut for Cheltenham in a 3–2 loss against Dagenham and Redbridge. On 13 May 2014 after two years at Whaddon Road, Roberts was released by Cheltenham.

In July 2014 he joined Wrexham on trial and played in a 1–0 win over Swansea City under 21s in the Dragons' first pre season friendly. He played in a second game for the Dragons in a 2–0 victory over his former club Colwyn Bay, where he kept a second consecutive clean sheet for Kevin Wilkin's side, revealing he wanted to earn a contract at the Racecourse Ground.

=== Chester ===
On 28 August 2014, Roberts signed for Conference Premier side Chester.

=== Bangor City ===
After being released from Chester, Roberts joined Bangor City in the Welsh Premier League.

=== The New Saints ===
In June 2018 he moved to The New Saints.

In February 2025 he confirmed he would retire at the end of the season. In his final season with the club, he achieved the treble with the club, of the league title, Welsh Cup and Welsh League Cup and in May 2025 was called up by the Welsh national football team for a training camp in Spain.

==== Llandudno (loan) ====
After making three cup appearances for TNS, Roberts joined Llandudno on a short-term loan deal. He made his debut in a 3–0 defeat against Connah's Quay.

==== Aberystwyth Town (loans) ====
In August 2019, Roberts signed for Aberystwyth Town on a season long loan. In September 2020, Roberts rejoined Aberystwyth on a short-term loan deal.

=== Caernarfon Town ===
In July 2025 he reversed his decision to retire and signed for Caernarfon Town.

== International career ==
Roberts qualifies for both Wales and Northern Ireland. After progressing through the Wales under-17 and under-19 teams, Roberts made his debut for Wales under-21s in a 3–0 home friendly victory over Iceland in February 2013.

In May 2014, he received a call up to the Wales senior squad for a friendly international against the Netherlands in early June.

In March 2020, Roberts was called up to the Wales C team for their game against England C.

== Personal life ==
He is the son of Stuart Roberts, who played as a goalkeeper for Stoke City. In May 2025 Roberts confirmed that his retirement was linked to mental health problems he had experienced after the death of his father in June 2023.

== Honours ==
Caernarfon Town

- Welsh Cup: 2025–26
