= Ian Roberts (cricketer) =

English cricketer

Personal information
- Full name: Ian Clement Roberts
- Born: 29 April 1948 (age 78); Plymouth, Devon, England
- Batting: Right-handed
- Bowling: Right-arm medium-fast

Domestic team information
- Years: Team
- 1974–1980: Devon

Career statistics
Competition	List A
Matches	1
Runs scored	–
Batting average	–
100s/50s	–/–
Top score	–
Balls bowled	42
Wickets	–
Bowling average	–
5 wickets in innings	–
10 wickets in match	–
Best bowling	–
Catches/stumpings	–/–
- Source: Cricinfo, 12 February 2011

Ian Clement Roberts (born 29 April 1948) is a former English cricketer. Roberts was a right-handed batsman who bowled right-arm medium-fast. He was born in Plymouth, Devon.

== Professional career ==
Roberts made his debut for Devon in the 1974 Minor Counties Championship against Berkshire. From 1974 to 1980, he represented the county in 26 Championship matches, the last of which came against Oxfordshire. He also represented Devon in a single List A match, at a time when they were permitted to take part in the domestic one-day competition, against Cornwall in the 1980 Gillette Cup 1st round. He wasn't required to bat in the match and with the ball he bowled 7 wicket-less overs.
