= Arthur Roberts (cricketer) =

English cricketer (1874–1961)

Personal information
- Full name: Arthur Wilson Roberts
- Born: 23 September 1874; Malegaon, Bombay Presidency, British Raj
- Died: 27 June 1961 (aged 86); Hastings, Sussex, England
- Batting: Right-handed
- Bowling: Right-arm fast-medium
- Relatives: Francis Roberts (brother)

Domestic team information
- Years: Team
- 1908–1913: Gloucestershire
- 1902: Buckinghamshire
- 1896–1897: Oxfordshire

Career statistics
Competition	First-class
Matches	29
Runs scored	807
Batting average	18.76
100s/50s	–/4
Top score	90
Balls bowled	611
Wickets	12
Bowling average	33.75
5 wickets in innings	–
10 wickets in match	–
Best bowling	2/20
Catches/stumpings	17/–
- Source: Cricinfo, 14 May 2011

Arthur Wilson Roberts (23 September 1874 – 27 June 1961) was an English cricketer. Roberts was a right-handed batsman who bowled right-arm fast-medium. He was born in Malegaon, Bombay Presidency and later educated at Rossall School in Lancashire, England.

Roberts made his debut in county cricket for Oxfordshire in the 1896 Minor Counties Championship. He played a further match for Oxfordshire in the following season. He later appeared in 2 Minor Counties Championship matches for Buckinghamshire in 1902.

Roberts made his first-class debut for Gloucestershire against Hampshire in 1908 County Championship. He played 28 first-class matches for Gloucestershire, the last coming against Somerset in the 1913 County Championship. In those 28 first-class matches, he scored 727 runs at a batting average of 17.73, with a 3 half centuries and a high score of 90. His highest score came against Somerset in 1911. A part-time bowler, Roberts took 11 wickets for Gloucestershire at a bowling average of 36.00, with best figures of 2/20.

He also played a single first-class match for an England XI against Hambledon in a commemorative match at the Broadhalfpenny Down ground, home to the original Hambledon Club. In this match he was dismissed for 11 in the England XI's first-innings by Jack Newman, while in their second-innings he scored 69 runs before being dismissed by the same bowler. With the ball he took a single wicket, that of Guy Bignell.

He died in Hastings, Sussex on 27 June 1961. He survived his brother, Francis, who had also played first-class cricket but was killed in the First World War by 45 years.
