= Andrew Roberts =

Andrew Roberts may refer to:

- Andrew Roberts, Baron Roberts of Belgravia (born 1963), historian and Conservative Party life peer
- Andrew Roberts (Northamptonshire cricketer) (born 1971), English former cricketer
- Andrew D. Roberts (1937–2024), British historian of Africa
- Andrew Roberts (visual effects artist) (born 1968), English visual effects artist
- Buckshot Roberts (c. 1831–1878), American frontiersman

== See also ==
- Andy Roberts (disambiguation)
- Robert Andrews (disambiguation)
