= Richard Roberts =

Richard Roberts may refer to:

== Clergypeople ==
- Richard Roberts (minister) (1874–1945), British-Canadian minister and 6th Moderator of the United Church of Canada
- Richard Roberts (priest) (1884–1970), Welsh Anglican priest
- Richard Roberts (evangelist) (born 1948), American charismatic televangelist

== Sportspeople ==
- Richard Roberts (footballer, born 1878) or Dick Roberts (1878–1931), English footballer
- Richard Roberts (rugby) or Dick Roberts (1889–1973), New Zealand rugby union player
- Richard Roberts (footballer, born 1891) or Dick Roberts, Welsh footballer
- Richard Roberts (English footballer), English footballer in the 1940s
- Richard Roberts (American soccer), American soccer forward in the 1940s and 1950s

== Other people ==
- Richard Roberts (engineer) (1789–1864), British engineer
- Richard Roberts (sea captain) (1803–1841), Irish captain of the SS President
- Richard Roberts (Australian politician) (1835–1903), New South Wales politician
- Richard Howell Roberts (1916–1986), Canadian Surgeon General
- Richard Roberts (attorney, born 1937) or Richie Roberts, former New Jersey police detective and defense attorney
- Sir Richard J. Roberts (born 1943), British biochemist and molecular biologist
- Richard Roberts (musician, born 1949) or Rick Roberts, American musician
- Richard Roberts (also known as Bert), Australian geoscientist and archaeologist, director of ARC Centre of Australian Biodiversity and Heritage
- Richard W. Roberts (born 1953), American judge
- Richard Roberts (pharmaceutical executive) (born 1957), American pharmaceutical executive
- Richard Roberts (actor) or Rick Roberts (born 1965), Canadian actor
- Richard Owain Roberts (born 1982), Welsh author
- Richard Roberts (Gruffydd Rhisiart) (1809–1883), Welsh writer
- Richard Roberts, musician in Chi-Pig

== See also ==
- Dick Roberts (disambiguation)
- Rick Roberts (disambiguation)
