= Francis Roberts (cricketer) =

English cricketer and member of the British Armed Forces

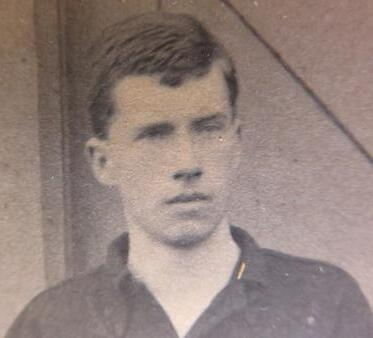
Roberts c. 1910

Captain Francis Bernard Roberts (20 May 1882 – 8 February 1916) was an English cricketer and member of the British Armed Forces who was killed in World War I. A right-handed batsman and right-arm fast bowler whose brother Arthur also played first-class cricket, Roberts was born in Nasik in India and played for Cambridge University and Gloucestershire, minor county cricket for Oxfordshire and for his alma mater Magdalen College School, Oxford (1894–1898) and Rossall School (1898–1901). Roberts' first-class career spanned 1903 to 1914 on the outbreak of World War I, across eighty matches where he scored 2,566 runs at a batting average of 20.36 with five centuries and a best of 157. With the ball he took 88 wickets.

A graduate of Jesus College, Cambridge, he served during the First World War as a captain in the 9th Battalion of the Rifle Brigade. He was killed in February 1916 in Belgium aged thirty-three.
