= Anne C. Roberts =

American interventional radiologist

Anne Christine Roberts is an American interventional radiologist who is credited with the invention of the Roberts Uterine Catheter (RUC), a catheter designed to facilitate navigation through the uterine arteries and currently used widely for uterine artery embolization procedures. She also served as president of the Society of Interventional Radiology (SIR) (1996-1997) and was the second woman to become president of the society.

== Early life and education ==
Roberts received her medical degree from the University of California, San Diego (UCSD) in 1982. After completing an intern year in obstetrics and gynecology at Cedars-Sinai Medical Center in 1983, she completed her residency in diagnostic radiology at Massachusetts General Hospital in 1986. She then pursued a fellowship in vascular radiology at Massachusetts General Hospital from 1986 to 1987.

== Work and research ==
Roberts has been a leader in the field of interventional radiology, previously serving as president of SIR in 1997, as well as vice-president of the American College of Radiology (ACR) in 2015 and executive vice-chair for the department of radiology at UCSD from 2002 to 2010. She is currently a Professor of Clinical Radiology at UCSD and division chief of vascular and interventional radiology.

Roberts' research has focused on the field of cardiovascular and interventional radiology. Her work includes inferior vena cava filters, bronchial artery embolization, and the role of interventional radiology in pediatric liver transplant programs.

Her work has been recognized by several awards. She is a fellow of the ACR and of SIR. In 2003, Roberts received the Business Women of the Year Award from the San Diego Business Journal. In 2015, she received the Gold Medal of the Society of Interventional Radiology, the highest honor given in the field of interventional radiology.
