= Margaret Roberts =

Margaret Roberts may refer to:

- Margaret Roberts (Barbie), the fictional mother of Barbie, a doll
- Margaret C. Roberts (1846-1926), American obstetrician
- Margaret Thatcher (née Roberts, 1925–2013), British stateswoman
- Margaret Roberts (figure skater), 1947 participant in Canadian Figure Skating Championships
- Margaret Roberts (herbalist) (1937–2017), South African herbalist and author
- Margherita Roberti (née Roberts), American operatic soprano
