= Christopher Trevor-Roberts =

Christopher Trevor-Roberts (died 5 May 2005, aged 77) was a teacher who taught all four children of Queen Elizabeth II.

Christopher Trevor-Roberts is credited with helping Prince Charles overcome his aversion to mathematics. His methods were unconventional, and included teaching children in local restaurants and keeping chickens.

He was born in North Wales and educated at Bromsgrove School. Though he initially trained as an opera singer "TR", as he was known, set up his first school in the early 1960s in his house in the Vale of Health in Hampstead. As the house dining room was not large enough to accommodate the 20 pupils at the school, he regularly led the children to Hampstead's Moonlight Chinese restaurant where they ate from one of the set menus.

When Sir Martin Charteris, the Queen's then private secretary, heard of TR's abilities he summoned him to Buckingham Palace to coach Prince Charles. Trevor-Roberts went on to teach Princess Anne, Prince Andrew, Prince Edward and the children of Princess Margaret.

Several other famous people sent their children to him, including musicians such as Sir Georg Solti and Lulu.

The preparatory school he founded in London is now run by his son and daughter, and has been described by the Good Schools Guide as a "Small, family-run school with an individualistic ethos."
