= Paddy Roberts =

Patrick or Paddy Roberts may refer to:

- Patrick Roberts (born 1997), English footballer
- Paddy Roberts (footballer) (1939-2022), Irish footballer
- Paddy Roberts (songwriter) (1910–1975), songwriter and singer
- Paddy Roberts (born 1929), British tennis player competed at Wimbledon & Roland Garros.
- Pat Roberts (born 1936), United States Senator from Kansas
