= Tracey Roberts =

Tracey Roberts may refer to:

- Tracey Roberts (actress) (1914–2002), American film and TV supporting performer
- Tracey Roberts (politician), Western Australian political figure since 2003, City of Wanneroo mayor
