= Ryan Roberts =

Ryan Roberts may refer to:

- Ryan Roberts (baseball) (born 1980), American baseball player
- Ryan Roberts (fighter) (born 1978), American mixed martial artist
- Ryan Roberts (gymnast) (born 1992), American trampoline gymnast
- Ryan Roberts (American football) (born 1980), American football player

== See also ==
- Robert Ryan (disambiguation)
- Ryan Robert Jarvis, English footballer
