= Roy Roberts (disambiguation) =

Roy Roberts (1906-1975) was an American character actor.

Roy Roberts may also refer to:

- Roy A. Roberts (1887–1967), Kansas City Star editor
- Roy Frank Roberts (1891–1959), American politician, member of the Florida House of Representatives
- Roy Michael Roberts (1952–1999), controversial inmate executed in Missouri
- Roy Roberts (blues artist) (born 1943), North Carolina blues artist
- Roy Roberts (baseball) (1894–1964), pitcher in the Negro leagues
- Roy Roberts (chief executive) (born 1939), African-American businessman and former vice-president of General Motors
- Roy Roberts (inventor), inventor of the carpet gripper rod or tack strip
