= Kevin Roberts =

Kevin Roberts may refer to:

- Kevin Roberts (businessman) (born 1949), executive with the advertising agency Saatchi & Saatchi
- Kevin Roberts (footballer, born 1989), English footballer for Chester
- Kevin Roberts (Australian footballer) (born 1939)
- Kevin Roberts (cricketer) (born 1972), former CEO of Cricket Australia
- Kevin Roberts (priest) (born 1955), Archdeacon of Carlisle
- Kevin W. S. Roberts (active 1979–2020), British economist
- Kevin Roberts (politician) (born 1966), Texas state legislator
- Kevin Roberts (political strategist) (born 1974), president of the Heritage Foundation
