= Troy Roberts =

Troy Roberts may refer to:

- Troy Roberts (journalist), American correspondent
- Troy Roberts (soccer), American soccer player
- Troy Roberts (musician), Australian jazz musician
