= Lawrence Roberts (footballer) =

Scottish footballer

Personal information
- Full name: Lawrence Roberts
- Place of birth: Scotland
- Position: Centre forward

Senior career*
Years	Team	Apps	(Gls)
19xx–1920	Renton	?	(?)
1920	Burnley	1	(0)
1920–19xx	Hamilton Academical	?	(?)
- * Club domestic league appearances and goals

Lawrence Roberts was a Scottish footballer who played as a centre forward. He played local football for Renton before joining Football League First Division side Burnley in February 1920. Roberts made his debut for on 14 February 1920 in a 2–0 win over Manchester City but was replaced by James Twiss for the following match against Sheffield Wednesday. He subsequently returned to Scotland, signing for Hamilton Academical in the Scottish Football League later that same month.
