= Stephen Roberts =

Stephen Roberts may refer to:

- Stephen Roberts (footballer, born 1980), former Welsh football player
- Stephen Roberts (Australian footballer) (1948–2026), Australian rules footballer
- Stephen Roberts (director) (1895–1936), American film director
- Stephen Henry Roberts (1901–1971), Australian historian and university vice-chancellor
- Stephen Roberts (historian) (1958–2022), historian of 19th-century Britain
- Stephen Roberts (priest) (born 1958), English Anglican priest
- Stephen J. Roberts (1915–2005), American veterinarian, professor at Cornell University, polo player and coach
- Stephen Cornelius Roberts (born 1952), American painter
- Stephen Roberts (professor) (born 1965), British academic and scientist

== See also ==
- Steven Roberts (disambiguation)
