= Fred M. Roberts =

American writer, botanist, and SCUBA and aviation enthusiast

Fred Marke Roberts is an American botanist, writer and underwater photographer. He wrote Basic Scuba. Self-contained underwater breathing apparatus, a 1960 scuba-diving manual, it was among the earliest comprehensive guides to recreational scuba diving and became widely used by sport divers during the 1960s. A botanist at UC Irvine, he has identified flower varieties. The son of Fred Max Roberts of Bismarck, North Dakota, he is a resident of Garden Grove, California, and is a published aviation enthusiast.
