= Matthew Roberts =

Matthew, Matt or Matty Roberts may refer to:

- Matthew D. Roberts (born 1962), American lawyer
- Matt Roberts (born 1977), English television presenter
- Matthew Roberts (footballer) (born 2003), Australian rules footballer
- Matt Roberts (died 2016), former lead guitarist of 3 Doors Down
- Matty "Blagg" Roberts (died 2000), lead vocalist of punk rock group Blaggers ITA
- Matty Roberts, the creator of the Storm Area 51 Facebook event in 2019
