= Alfred Roberts (disambiguation) =

Alfred Roberts (1892–1970) was a British grocer and the father of Margaret Thatcher.

Alfred Roberts may also refer to:

- Alf Roberts, fictional character from the British soap opera Coronation Street
- Alf Roberts (trade unionist) (1910–1971), British engineering industry trade unionist
- Alfred Roberts (trade unionist) (1897–1963), British cotton industry trade unionist
- A. J. Roberts (Alfred Jabez Roberts, 1863–1939), South Australian stockbroker and sportsman
- Alfred "Uganda" Roberts (1943–2020), American percussionist

== See also ==
- Alfred M. Robertson (1911–1975), American jockey
