= Ian Roberts (footballer, born 1961) =

Welsh footballer

Personal information
- Full name: Ian Mark Roberts
- Date of birth: 28 February 1961 (age 65)
- Place of birth: Colwyn Bay, Wales
- Position: Midfielder

Youth career
- Wrexham

Senior career*
Years	Team	Apps	(Gls)
1978–1980	Wrexham	6	(0)
- Bangor City
- * Club domestic league appearances and goals

Ian Mark Roberts (born 28 February 1961) is a Welsh former professional footballer who played as a midfielder. He played in the English Football League for Wrexham, and also played for Bangor City.
