= Lisa Roberts =

Lisa Roberts may refer to:

- Lisa Roberts (academic), professor of virology and Vice-Chancellor of the University of Exeter
- Lisa Roberts (politician), Canadian politician
- Lisa Roberts, bassist of the band Hole
- Lisa Roberts Gillan (born 1965), American actress and producer
- Elizabeth "Lisa" Roberts (1959–1977), American murder victim and formerly unidentified decedent.
