= Adam Roberts =

Adam Roberts may refer to:

- Adam Roberts (scholar) (born 1940), British scholar of international relations
- Adam Roberts (British writer) (born 1965), British academic, critic and novelist
- Adam Roberts (born 1979), American food writer and humorist who blogs under the pseudonym Amateur Gourmet
- Adam Roberts (motorcyclist) (born 1984), Canadian motorcycle racer
- Adam Roberts (film maker) (born 1959), British filmmaker, writer and curator
