= Dick Roberts =

Dick Roberts may refer to:

- Dick Roberts (footballer, born 1878) (1878–1931), English football winger
- Dick Roberts (footballer, born 1891) (1891–?), Welsh football left back
- Dick Roberts (musician) (1897–1966), American banjo and guitar player
- Dick Roberts (rugby union) (1889–1973), New Zealand rugby union player

== See also ==
- Richard Roberts (disambiguation)
- Rick Roberts (disambiguation)
- Dickie Roberts: Former Child Star, a 2003 American comedy film
