= Kennedy Roberts =

Grenadian politician

Kennedy Roberts (born 17 June 1962) is a politician and diplomat from Grenada. He has served as a member of the Senate of Grenada, and has been commercial attached to that nation's embassy in Cuba. He is currently an Ambassador with responsibility for the UN Sustainable Development Goals. He was born in Petite Martinique to Conrad and Cora Roberts, and is a member of the National Democratic Congress. He is married to Nikoyan Roberts and is the father of two children.
