= Wayne Roberts =

Wayne Roberts may refer to:

- Wayne Roberts (activist) (1944–2021), Canadian journalist, activist, food policy analyst
- Wayne Roberts (artist) (1950–2012), American graffiti artist better known as Stay High 149
- Wayne Roberts (bowls) (born 1989), South African bowls player
- Wayne Roberts (director), American director of Katie Says Goodbye (2016) and The Professor (2018)
- Wayne Roberts (soccer) (born 1977), South African football (soccer) player
