= Steven Roberts =

Steven or Steve Roberts may refer to:

- Steven K. Roberts (born 1952), American journalist, writer, cyclist, archivist, and explorer
- Steven V. Roberts (born 1943), American journalist and writer
- Steven Roberts (British Army soldier) (1969–2003), first British soldier to die in the 2003 invasion of Iraq
- Steve Roberts (American football) (born 1964), college football coach at Arkansas State University
- Steve Roberts (comics), British comics artist
- Steven Roberts (actor), British actor
- Steve Roberts (drummer) (died 2022), British drummer (UK Subs)
- Steven Roberts (Missouri politician) (born 1988/1989), Missouri State Senator

== See also ==
- Stephen Roberts (disambiguation)
