= Frank Leon Roberts =

American activist, writer, political commentator and college professor

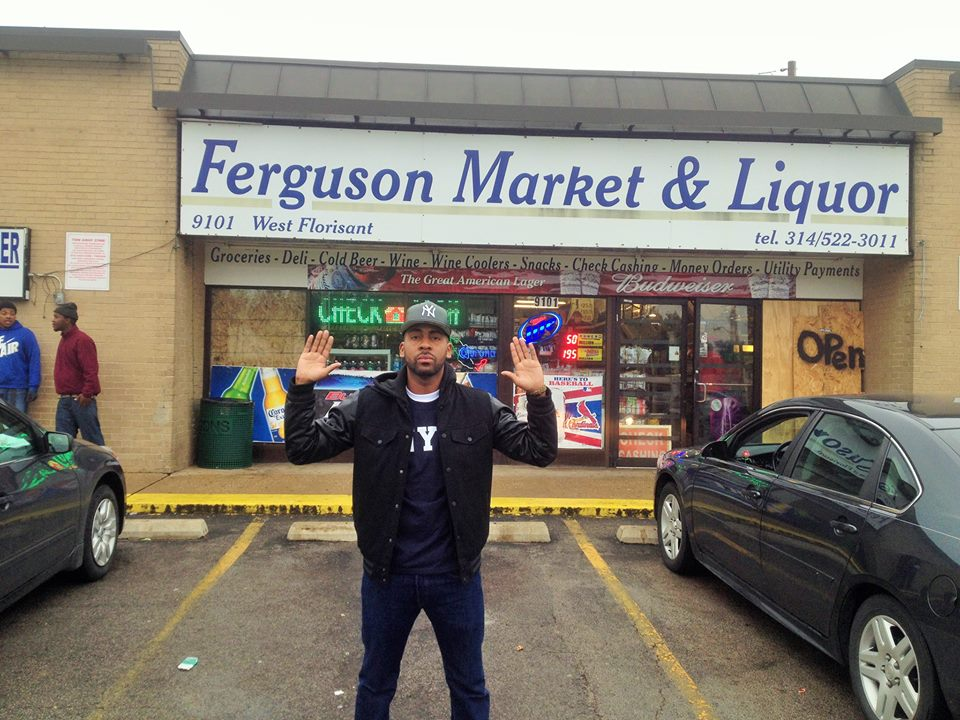
- Frank Leon Roberts, Ferguson, Missouri, October 2014.
- Born: August 25, 1982 (age 44); Jamaica, Queens, New York, New York
- Occupations: Professor, writer, commentator and activist

Academic background
- Education: New York University, Yale University

Frank Leon Roberts (born August 25, 1982) is an American activist, writer, political commentator, and college professor at Amherst College, known for his involvement in the #BlackLivesMatter movement. Roberts is a former faculty member at New York University's Gallatin School of Individualized Study, where his course "Black Lives Matter: Race, Resistance, and Populist Protest" received national attention for being widely acknowledged as the first such course offered on a university campus. He has been a frequent media commentator on issues related to the intersections of race and gender in American public life.

A community organizer and public speaker, Roberts's varied perspectives on #BlackLivesMatter's influence on public debates about race and racial inequity have been cited by The New York Times, BBC Radio, NBC, CBC, Univision, The Chronicle of Higher Education and a variety of national outlets.

Roberts is also the founder and executive director of For Freedom's Sake, a New York City based grassroots social justice organization that mobilizes black and brown communities through teach-ins and public dialogues.

Roberts is a 2019 Roddenberry Foundation Fellow, and a Ford Foundation Fellow.

== Education ==
Roberts is an undergraduate alumnus of New York University, where he received both NYU's Michael Parkes Distinguished Alumni Award and Martin Luther King Trailblazer Award in 2015. He also attended graduate school at NYU as a Ford Foundation Doctoral Dissertation Fellow and Yale University.
