= Jane Voss =

English highwayrobber and thief (d. 1684)

Jane Voss alias Jane Roberts (d. 1684), was an English highwayrobber and thief.

She was reputedly born in St Giles-in-the-Fields in London. She engaged in highway robbery with multiple male accomplices, at least seven of whom were executed. She herself was widely known in London, having been brought to court and condemned several times. She was condemned to penal transportation, but returned to London after it was served and continued her criminal career. She plead her belly and stayed imprisoned for a long time. She was finally executed in London on 19 December 1684.

Jane Voss was famous in her lifetime and was the subject of several pamphlets describing her life and career, the most famous being "The German Princess Revived, or, The London Jilt" (1684), and "True account of the behaviour, confessions, and last dying words, of Capt. James Watts, Capt. Peter Barnwell, Daniel D'Coiner alias Walker, Richard Jones, and Jane Voss alias Roberts who were executed at Tyburn, on the 19th of December 1684. for robbing on the high way, high treason, murther, and fellony, &c. Printed by order, &c." [London: printed by E.R. for R. Turner at the Star in St. Pauls Church-yard, 1684]. She was the subject of several legends about her life.
