= Daniel Roberts =

Daniel or Dan Roberts may refer to:

- Daniel Roberts (Royal Navy officer) (1789–1869)
- Daniel Foley Roberts (1834–1889), Queensland (Australia) politician
- Daniel Webster Roberts (1841–1935), Confederate soldier, and lawman with the Texas Rangers
- Dan Roberts (writer) (1912–1995), pseudonym of the Canadian writer W. E. D. Ross
- Dan Roberts (announcer) (born c. 1955), American public address announcer
- Dan Roberts (bassist) (born 1967), Canadian bassist
- Daniel Roberts (playwright) (born 1969), American playwright, editor and educator
- Daniel Roberts (fighter) (born 1980), American professional mixed martial arts fighter
- Daniel Roberts (attorney) (1811–1899)
- Daniel "Monkey Man" Roberts (born c. 1980), founder and owner of Pirate Cat Radio
- Dan Roberts (singer), American singer and songwriter
- Daniel Roberts (rugby union) (born 1992), South African professional rugby union player
- Daniel Roberts (hurdler) (born 1997), American hurdler

== See also ==
- Danny Roberts (disambiguation)
- Daniel Robert (fl. 1970s–2000s), American set decorator
