= Gene Roberts =

Gene Roberts may refer to:

- Gene Roberts (journalist) (born 1932), American editor and professor of journalism
- Gene Roberts (American football) (1923–2009), American football running back
- Meg Randall (1926–2018), American actress, credited as Gene Roberts before 1949
- Gene Roberts, former mayor of Chattanooga, Tennessee
- Gene Roberts, NASCAR Winston Cup Series crew chief for Melling Racing during the 1992 season

== See also ==
- Eugene Roberts (disambiguation)
- Jean Roberts (disambiguation)
