= Frederick Roberts (cricketer, born 1848) =

English cricketer

Frederick Roberts (24 September 1848 – 13 July 1903) was an English first-class cricketer active 1867–68 who played for Surrey. He was born in Kennington; died in Rotherhithe.
