= Stuart Roberts (footballer, born 1967) =

Welsh footballer

Personal information
- Full name: Stuart William Roberts
- Date of birth: 25 March 1967
- Place of birth: Chirk, Wales
- Date of death: 2 June 2023 (aged 56)
- Place of death: St Martin's, Shropshire, England
- Position: Goalkeeper

Senior career*
Years	Team	Apps	(Gls)
1983	Oswestry Town		
1984–1985	Stoke City	3	(0)
1986–1988	Derry City		
- * Club domestic league appearances and goals

Stuart William Roberts (25 March 1967 – 2 June 2023) was a Welsh footballer who played in the English Football League for Stoke City.

== Career ==
Roberts was born in Chirk and played with Oswestry Town in the Welsh league, impressing enough to earn a move to First Division side Stoke City as a teenager. He made his Football League debut on 8 December 1984 against Ipswich Town becoming Stoke City's youngest goalkeeper at the age of 17 years, 258 days. Stoke lost 2–0 and Roberts played in four more matches during a woeful 1984–85 campaign which saw them relegated with a record low points tally. At the end of the season he was released and joined Irish club Derry City. He spent two seasons at the Brandywell Stadium and won the League of Ireland First Division in 1986–87. His last game was the 1988 FAI Cup Final.

== Death ==
Roberts was found dead at his home in St Martin's, Shropshire on 2 June 2023. The inquest recorded a conclusion of suicide.

== Career statistics ==
Club	Season	League			FA Cup		League Cup		Total	
Club	Season	Division	Apps	Goals	Apps	Goals	Apps	Goals	Apps	Goals
Stoke City	1984–85	First Division	3	0	2	0	0	0	5	0
Career Total			3	0	2	0	0	0	5	0

== Honours ==
Derry City

- League of Ireland First Division champions: 1986–87
