= Frederick Roberts (cricketer, born 1881) =

English cricketer

Frederick Charles Roberts (5 June 1881 – unknown) played first-class cricket for Somerset in one match in 1899. He was born at Edington, Somerset. The date and place of his death is not known.

Roberts' single first-class cricket appearance came in the match between Somerset and Kent at Bath in June 1899. He batted in the lower order in Somerset's only innings, scoring three runs, and bowled a few economical overs in both Kent innings, but failed to take a wicket. Neither his batting nor his bowling style is known.
