= Arthur Roberts (British Army officer) =

British Army officer (1870–1917)

Brigadier-General Arthur Roberts CMG DSO
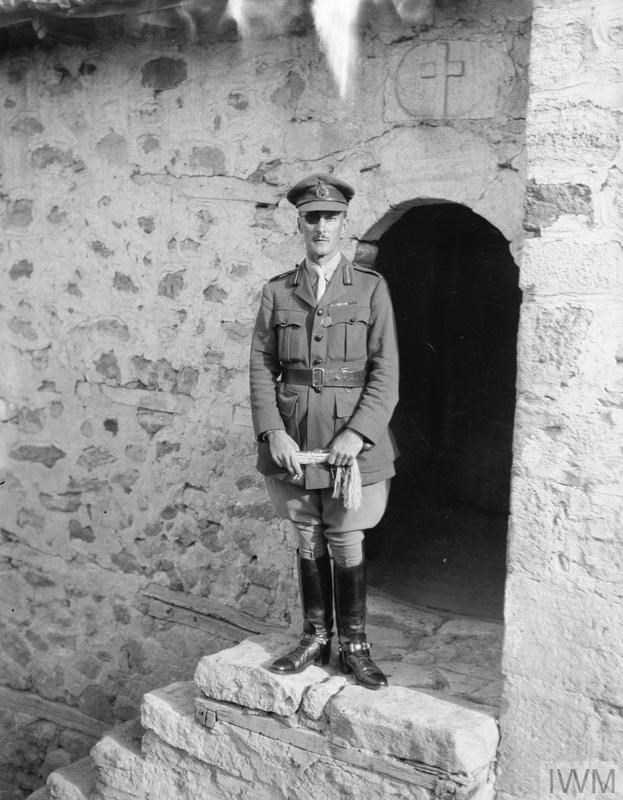
- Born: 1870
- Died: 17 May 1917 (aged 46–47); London, England
- Military career
- Allegiance: United Kingdom
- Branch: British Army
- Service years: 1890–1917
- Rank: Brigadier-General
- Units: Royal Fusiliers, Royal West African Frontier Force
- Conflicts: Second Boer War, First World War
- Awards: CMG, DSO

Brigadier-General Arthur Colin Roberts CMG DSO (1870–1917) was a senior British Army officer during the First World War.

== Biography ==
Born in 1870, Arthur Roberts was educated at Bedford School. He received his first commission as a second lieutenant in the Royal Fusiliers on 17 December 1890, was promoted to lieutenant on 26 June 1892, and to captain on 16 November 1898.

He served during the Second Boer War, taking part in operations in the Transvaal, the Orange Free State and the Cape Colony.

After the end of this war, he was in December 1902 seconded for service under the Colonial Office, and attached to the Royal West African Frontier Force, where he served between 1902 and 1904. He was promoted to the rank of major in 1907.

He served during the First World War, between 1914 and 1917, was promoted to the rank of lieutenant colonel in 1915, and to the temporary rank of brigadier general in 1916.

Roberts was invested as a Companion of the Distinguished Service Order, and as a Companion of the Order of St Michael and St George. He died in London on 17 May 1917.
