= Elizabeth Madox Roberts =

American novelist (1881–1941)

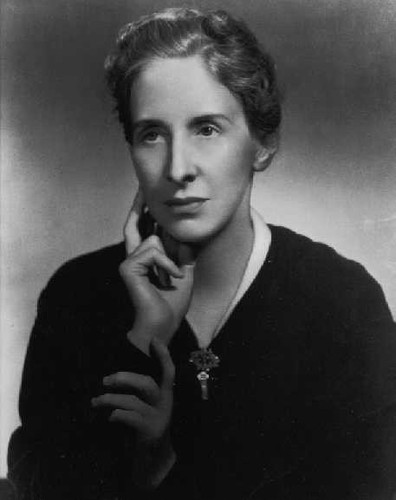
- Roberts (date unknown)
- Born: October 30, 1881; Perryville, Kentucky, United States
- Died: March 13, 1941 (aged 59); Orlando, Florida, United States
- Education: University of Chicago
- Known for: Novelist and poet
- Website: Elizabeth Madox Roberts Society

Elizabeth Madox Roberts (October 30, 1881 – March 13, 1941) was a Kentucky novelist and poet, primarily known for her novels and stories set in central Kentucky's Washington County, including The Time of Man (1926), My Heart and My Flesh, The Great Meadow (1930) and A Buried Treasure (1931). Robert Penn Warren called The Time of Man a classic; the eminent Southern critic and Southern Review editor Lewis P. Simpson counted Roberts among the half-dozen major Southern renascence writers. Three book-length studies of her work, three collections of critical articles, a major conference on her 100th birthday, a collection of her unpublished poems, and a flourishing Roberts Society that generates 20-odd papers at its annual April conferences have yet to revive wide interest in her work.

== Life ==
Born in Perryville, Kentucky, on October 30, 1881, Roberts grew up and spent most of her adult life in nearby Springfield, Kentucky. She was the second of eight children born to Simpson Roberts and Mary Elizabeth Brent Roberts, a Confederate soldier turned engineer and a school teacher. Roberts attended high school in Covington, Kentucky, before enrolling briefly at the University of Kentucky (then the State College of Kentucky) in 1900 but was forced to drop out after one semester because of her poor health. For the next ten years, Roberts taught elementary school in the Springfield area with her mother.

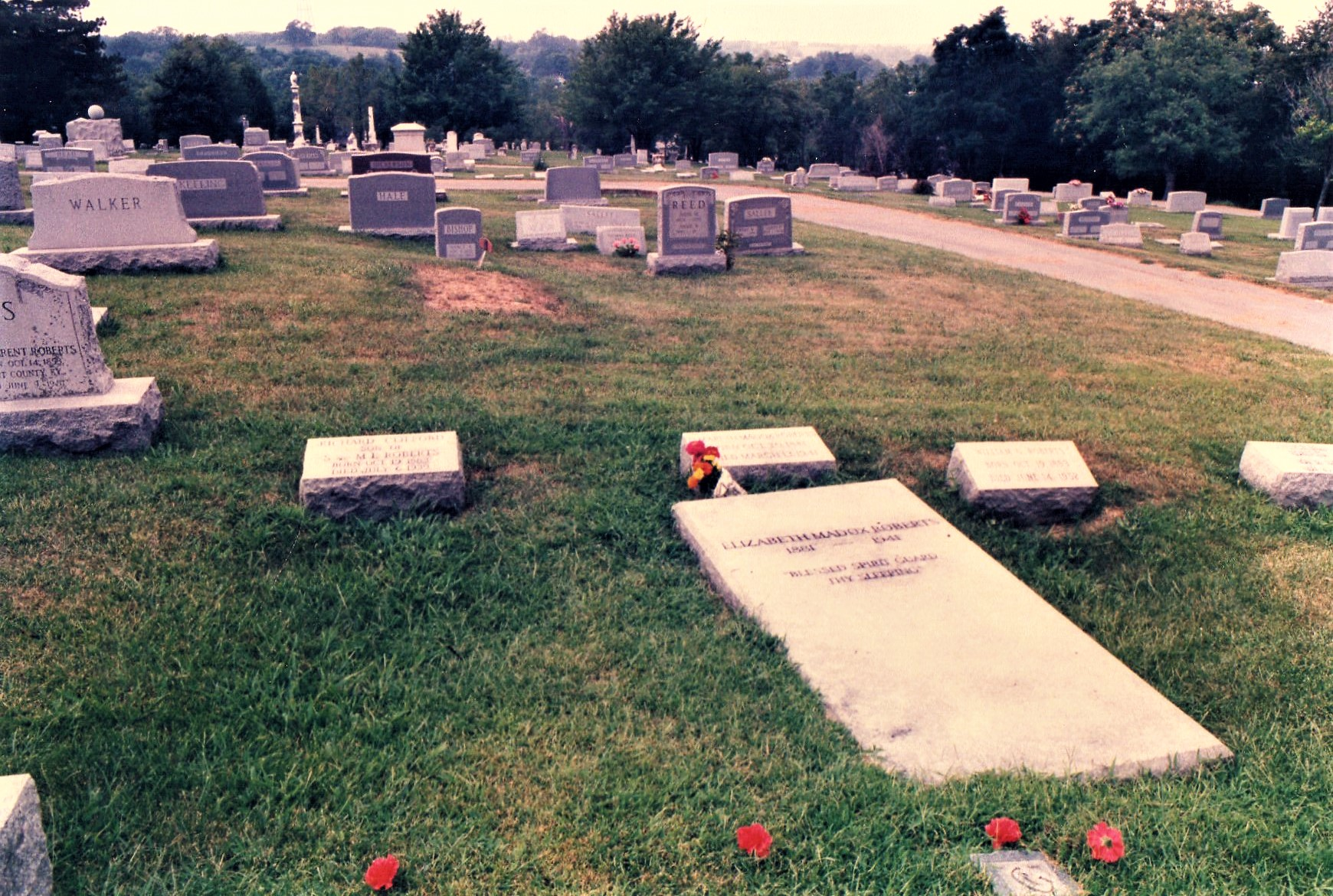
Grave of Elizabeth Madox Roberts in Springfield, Kentucky

In 1910, she went to live for several years with her sister in Colorado and it was here that she contributed several poems to a little book of photographs of mountain flowers, which became her first published work (In the Great Steep's Garden, privately printed, 1915). On the recommendation of a professor friend, Roberts enrolled as a freshman at the University of Chicago at the age of 36 in 1917, avidly studying literature and philosophy and fulfilling a lifelong dream of acquiring a college education. At the University of Chicago, she joined the Poetry club, which included Glenway Wescott, Yvor Winters and Janet Lewis, forming friendships and professional relationships. She graduated with a B.A. with honors in 1921, Phi Beta Kappa, and was awarded the Fiske Prize for a group of poems she wrote which went on to be published as Under the Tree in 1922. After completing her education, Roberts returned to Springfield, Kentucky, where she would spend much of the rest of her life.

Roberts' first novel, The Time of Man (1926), about the daughter of a Kentucky tenant farmer, garnered her an international reputation. She went on to write several more successful and critically acclaimed novels throughout the 1920s and '30s, including The Great Meadow (1930), a historical novel about the early settling of Kentucky; A Buried Treasure (1931), about a rural Kentucky farm family who finds a pot of gold; He Sent Forth a Raven (1935), which reflects the contrasting World War I era ideological forces, and Black Is My Truelove's Hair (1938), the story of a shamed woman's return to her home village and restoration. Roberts was diagnosed with terminal Hodgkin's disease in 1936. After this blow, Roberts began spending her winters in Florida; however, she returned to Springfield for the warmer months, writing and meeting family responsibilities.

During her career, Roberts saw her public recognition solidified by several major prizes, including the John Reed Memorial Prize in 1928, an O. Henry Award in 1930, and the Poetry Society of South Carolina's prize in 1931. The Time of Man was nominated for the Pulitzer Prize in 1926; The Great Meadow was nominated for the same award in 1930. Robert Penn Warren spoke admiringly of her work, once calling her "that rare thing, a true artist".

Roberts died in Orlando, Florida, in 1941 and was returned home to Springfield for her burial.

In 2012, Dr. Victoria Barker, an English professor at Carson-Newman College, edited a previously unpublished novel by Roberts titled Flood.

== Bibliography ==
- In the Great Steep's Garden (1915)
- Under the Tree (1922)
- The Time of Man (1926)
- My Heart and My Flesh (1927)
- Jingling in the Wind (1928)
- The Great Meadow (1930)
- A Buried Treasure (1931)
- The Haunted Mirror (1932)
- He Sent Forth a Raven (1935)
- Black Is My True Love's Hair (1938)
- Song in the Meadow (1940)
- Not by Strange Gods (1941)
- Flood (2012)
