= Arthur Spencer Roberts =

English painter (1920–1997)

Arthur Spencer Roberts (8 January 1920 – October 1997) was a British painter interested mainly in animal and wildlife subjects, but who also produced portraits and paintings of military scenes. His largest work was a mural for the Manor House at Port Lympne Zoo.

== Early life ==
Roberts' father, Arthur Meyrick Roberts, was an army officer serving in World War I and later Ireland, where he married and Spencer was born in Cork. He rose to bandmaster in the Kings own Yorkshire Light Infantry, but eventually left the army and became a trombone player for the Scottish Orchestra in Glasgow (1923–27). The family moved to Hastings on medical advice that a southern climate would improve Arthur's tuberculosis. Swimming was advised to help his condition, following the example of Johnny Weissmuller, who has also suffered from tuberculosis. Arthur became a proficient swimmer to the point of being selected in 1939 for the 1940 Olympic team for 100 m freestyle, but the onset of war caused the event to be cancelled. He had a youthful interest in wildlife and bird watching and became an expert beach fisherman.

He was educated at Hastings Grammar School from 1931 to 1937. He then attended Hastings College of Art, run by Philip Cole and Percy Badham. Cole objected to the use of erasers, and Roberts retained the habit of never using one throughout his career. Badham was an able watercolourist, and this also influenced Roberts in his preference for using watercolours and gouache. Roberts won a scholarship to attend the Royal College of Art, but this was also prevented by the outbreak of war.

== Military career ==
Roberts joined the 114th Field Regiment of the Territorial Army in 1938, on the advice of his father that war was inevitable, against the wishes of his mother. In 1939, the unit trained with guns taken from Hastings Museum, but shortly received modern equipment. Roberts volunteered to become an airforce pilot and was trained initially at Scarborough Initial Training Wing, then Perth Elementary Flying School, using Tiger Moth and Miles Magister aircraft. He was part of the first group to be sent to the US for fighter training under the Empire Air Training Plan, training with Airacobras, Lockheed Lightnings, Tomahawks and Kittyhawks at Lakeland, Florida. In 1942 Roberts crashed a tomahawk, initially surviving uninjured, but receiving a severe head injury when he was dropped out of the wreck during rescue. He was sent to Canada where he received further training as a bomb aimer and navigator before becoming a navigation instructor with rank of flight lieutenant in the Royal Canadian Air force at Trenton, Ontario, when he was pronounced permanently unfit to fly.

In 1943 he was recalled to the army in England, and sent temporarily to Watford. He was chosen amongst other soldiers to take part in the film The Way Ahead directed by Carol Reed. After the war, Reed offered Roberts more acting work, which he declined. He was posted to India, underwent jungle training at Deolali before serving temporarily at various places in India and Pakistan, with rank of Gunner. He requested transfer to Burma where he served as a sergeant in 1944 at the Arakan Front, where he was employed to scout and make drawings of enemy positions. He received a bullet wound to his right hand, which became close to requiring amputation.

After hostilities ceased and while the army stayed in India, he produced a number of murals in various buildings (hospitals and the palace of the Maharajah of Mysore). In 1946 he was demobilised having won six campaign medals. In later life he painted scenes of guns used in the Gulf War, the Arakan campaign and scenes from the Battle of the Somme where both his and his wife's father had served.

== Later life ==
In 1946, he was demobbed and returned to Sussex. There he met his wife Mavis and was married in 1946 at St Mary Magdalen Church in Hastings. From 1946 to 1948 he completed his Fine Arts degree, before attending Brighton Arts College in 1949 to obtain a teaching diploma. He began teaching at Maidstone Secondary Modern school for one year, before obtaining a post at Hastings Central School.

In 1955 he illustrated a book about Canada, 'Smoke over Sikanska by J.S. Gowland. This encouraged him to move to British Columbia in Canada. He first took a post to teach art history at Vancouver university, but then found work as a commercial artist for the Hudson's Bay Company in Vancouver where he prepared advertising illustrations of items ranging from Lingerie to artworks.

In 1957 he was recalled to England by the British army because of the Suez Crisis, but this was over before he returned to military life. He spent a year preparing work for an exhibition and completed paintings from sketches made in Canada. These paintings began to sell, but he took a teaching job at the Downs school, Bexhill. The couple initially lived in St Leonards-on-Sea, but purchased a house on a cliff top at Fairlight where they remained for five years.

In 1965 Roberts decided to sell the house, purchase a caravan, and move to the Isle of Arran in Scotland. Privations of life in the wilderness and a desire for company eventually led to another return to Sussex and the purchase of a house in Rye, together with a return to part-time teaching. The availability for purchase of a dilapidated coastguard cottage allowed both a return to beachside living at Fairlight and an opportunity to pay off the mortgage, allowing Roberts to work full-time as an artist. Interest in his works increased, with exhibitions in London and an increasing number of visitors to his home. Further exhibitions followed at the Armand Hammer galleries in New York City.

After returning from one such visit, the couple discovered that their home had moved dramatically closer to the cliff edge following ongoing rock slides. They decided to move again, this time to a former boathouse once used to plan the construction of the Royal Military Canal.

Exhibitions of his paintings in America were successful and were followed by others in Dallas, Houston, San Antonio, and Japan.
