= Thomas Roberts (footballer) =

English footballer

Personal information
- Full name: Thomas Roberts
- Date of birth: c. 1903
- Place of birth: Bristol, England
- Positions: Inside forward; wing half

Senior career*
Years	Team	Apps	(Gls)
- Fairfield United
?–1924	Bedminster Victoria		
1924–1925	Trowbridge Town	10	(2)
1925–1930	Bristol Rovers	120	(6)
1930–?	Lovell's Athletic		
- * Club domestic league appearances and goals

Thomas Roberts was an English professional footballer who played 120 games in The Football League as an inside forward and wing half for Bristol Rovers between 1925 and 1930.

Roberts was born in Bristol in the early 20th century and started his footballing career in the Bristol and Suburban Association Football League. He joined Trowbridge Town from Bedminster Victoria in 1924, and after playing just ten League games for Trowbridge he took part in a trial with Football League club Bristol Rovers. The trial was a successful one, and he signed for Rovers on 11 March 1925. He went on to play 120 times in the League, scoring six times, before joining Welsh club Lovell's Athletic in 1930.

Following the end of his playing days he emigrated to Canada.
