= Ralph Roberts (automotive designer) =

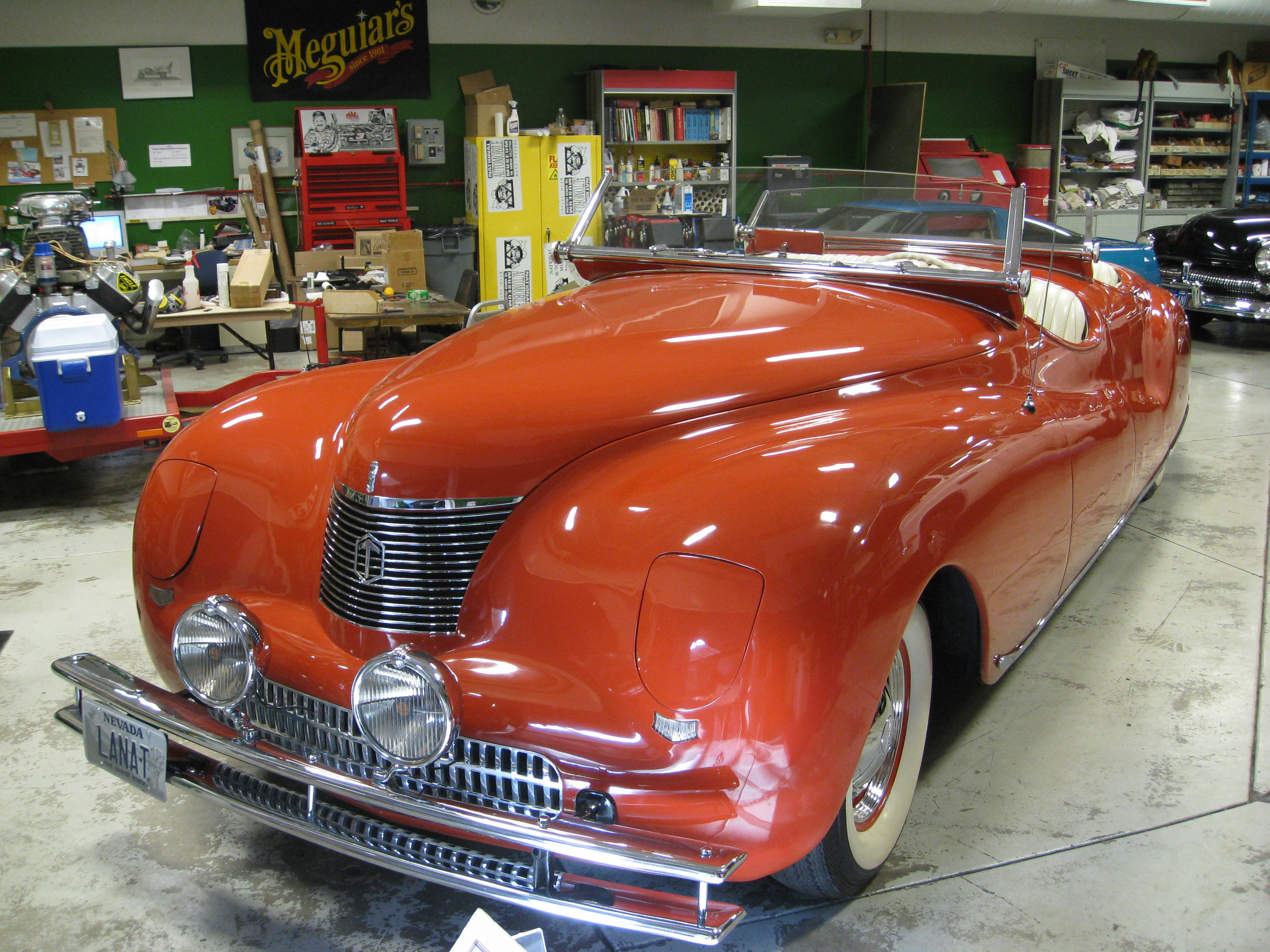
Ralph Roberts' 1941 Chrysler Newport dual cowl Phaeton show car

Ralph Roberts was an American automotive designer who worked for the Chrysler Corporation during the 1930s and 1940s.

== LeBaron ==
Although a designer Roberts joined the founders of design practice LeBaron in 1921 to look after administration. The founders left but he remained in the practice which grew to manufacture car bodies and was taken over in 1927 by Briggs. Roberts moved to Briggs along with LeBaron.

== Briggs Motor Bodies ==
Roberts spent much of the second half of the 1930s in England setting up the Briggs Manufacturing Company plant for the bodies for Ford Dagenham.

== Glass fiber ==
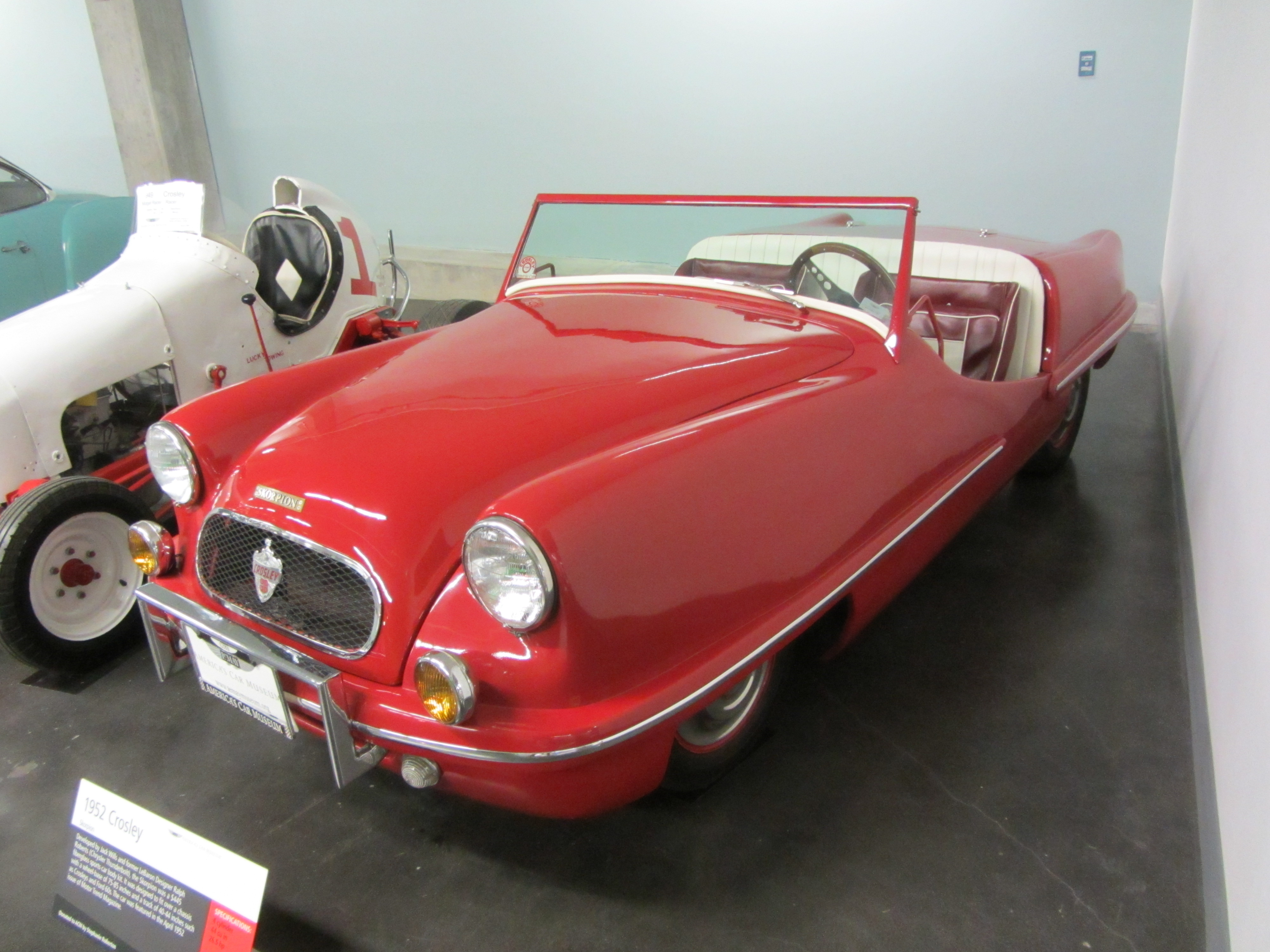
1952 Skorpion

Jack Wills of Pasadena California brought in Roberts and formed Wills and Roberts Manufacturing Company (WiRo or WilRo) in 1942 to make plastic housings for Aerojet and fiberglass droppable boats using one of the first polyester resins — Lamitex —and Owens-Corning Fiberglas. Postwar Roberts designed and built a clay model in 1946 for a fibreglass body later briefly made and sold as the Skorpion car.
