= Ken Roberts (author) =

Canadian librarian and children's writer (born 1946)

Ken Roberts (born 1946) is a Canadian librarian and children's writer who lives in Nanaimo, BC.

== Biography ==
Ken Roberts is the former Chief Librarian of the Hamilton Public Library. His hobby is writing. Ken Roberts has taught Public Library Children's Services at UBC, Children's Literature at Simon Fraser University and Storytelling/Puppetry at the University of Lethbridge. He has been Storyteller in Residence for the Vancouver School Board and Games Master for the World Improvisation Championships. Ken Roberts was also a two-time All-American distance runner, having attended UCLA as an undergraduate and both McMaster University and UWO for master's degrees.

== Awards/recognitions ==
Ken Roberts has won a CanPro award for television writing and co-wrote a comedic play for adults (Suspect) that received a very positive review in Variety and has played regularly, with performances on three continents.

His book Past Tense was nominated for the prestigious Governor General's Award for Children's Literature in 1994. He has also been a finalist for the Christie Book Award and for the Canadian Children's Book of the Year. His book The Thumb in the Box received a starred review in The Horn Book. Another children's novel, Hiccup Champion of the World, has been translated into a number of languages.

Ken won the Canadian Association of Public Libraries' Outstanding Service Award in 2001 and the Hamilton Public Library system won the Ontario Library Association's President's Award for Exceptional Achievement in 2002.

Ken is a past president of the Canadian Library Association.

== Works ==
- Crazy Ideas - 1984
- Pop Bottles - 1987
- Hiccup Champion of the World - 1988
- Jacques Cartier - 1988
- Nothing Wright - 1991
- Past Tense - 1994 (nominated for a Governor General's Award)
- The Thumb in the Box - 2001
- Thumb on a Diamond - 2006
- Thumb and the Bad Guys - 2010
