= Lord Roberts =

Lord Roberts may refer to:

- Field Marshal Frederick Roberts (1832–1914), Anglo-Irish high commander of the British Army in the Victorian Era, and revered military hero
- Lord Roberts (electoral district), a provincial electoral division in the Canadian province of Manitoba, named after the above

== Other people ==
- John Roberts, 2nd Baron Roberts (1606–1685), English Civil War and Restoration politician and soldier, also Viscount Bodmin and Earl of Radnor
- Goronwy Roberts, Baron Goronwy-Roberts (1913–1981), Welsh Labour MP and peer
- Wyn Roberts, Baron Roberts of Conwy (1930–2013), Welsh Conservative peer
- Roger Roberts, Baron Roberts of Llandudno (born 1935), Welsh Liberal Democrat peer
- Andrew Roberts, Baron Roberts of Belgravia (born 1963)

== See also ==
- Baron Robartes (Roberts), (first creation) and Earl of Radnor (Robartes/Roberts family), English peerages created 1679
- Baron Robartes (Roberts), (second creation) and Viscount Clifden (Agar-Robartes family), English peerage created 1869
- Baron Clwyd (Roberts family), United Kingdom peerage created in 1919
