= Mary Fanton Roberts =

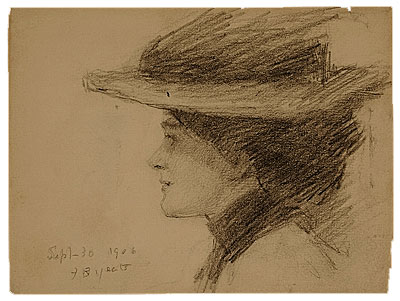
Mary Fanton Roberts, 1906 portrait by Robert Henri.

Mary Fanton Roberts (1864–1956) was an American journalist and writer. She was best known as an editor of women's and decorating magazines. During her long career she was editor of the illustrated monthly Demorest's, editor-in-chief of New Idea Woman's Magazine, managing editor of The Craftsman, and creator and editor of The Touchstone and Decorative Arts magazine. She often wrote articles on the topic of decorative arts and home decorating, and published two books, Inside 100 Homes and 101 Ideas for Successful Interiors. She was also an avid gardener. She occasionally wrote criticism under the pen name, Giles Edgerton.

== Biography ==
Roberts was born in Brooklyn, New York, but moved as a young girl to Deadwood, in the Montana territory. When she was old enough, she and her sister were sent back to New York to attend the Albany Female Academy. After finishing school, Roberts pursued journalism and became a staff writer for four years for the Herald Tribune, the Journal, and The Sun in New York City. Her first assignment as a reporter was to interview Hetty Green and the article she wrote about her was "so successful that it launched her into what was to be a lifetime career."

Roberts was very much involved in the artistic, theatrical, and literary circles in New York City, and she became friends with many American avant-garde artists. Roberts was responsible for helping to launch many artists' careers. She was active in organizations such as the Women's City Club, Pen and Brush, and the MacDowell Society. As an avid supporter of modern dance, she became close to many performers, including Isadora Duncan and Angna Enters.

She married William Carman Roberts in 1906.

During WWI, she and Paris Singer helped establish a hospital for soldiers with "shell shock" to convalesce in Palm Beach. Roberts used her platform as an editor to raise awareness of the issue and support the hospital.

Roberts moved to the Chelsea Hotel in 1941, where she lived for the rest of her life. She maintained lifelong relationships with a wide circle of friends and continued to correspond with them and attend social events until her death.

== Writing ==
Roberts' book, Inside 100 Homes (1937), is about the decoration of homes and is illustrated with numerous photographs. The Indianapolis Star wrote that Inside 100 Homes was "a book to fit the new spirit of life."
