= Arthur Roberts (physicist) =

American physicist and composer (1912–2004)

Arthur Roberts (July 6, 1912 – April 22, 2004) was an American physicist and composer.

He is remembered for several humoristic and satirical songs on scientific subjects, which he sang to piano accompaniment.

== Songs ==
His best-known songs are preserved in a 78 rpm vinyl record made in 1947. The songs are performed by faculty and students of the "State University of Iowa" (now the University of Iowa).

His song Take away your billion dollars (1948) inveighs against Berkelitis, the mega-project mania inspired by the huge growth of the Berkeley Radiation Laboratory in the 1930s and later by the Manhattan Project that took over physics research after World War II; and he calls for a return to brains-before-dollars science:

It seems that I'm a failure, just a piddling dilettante,
Within six months a mere ten thousand bucks is all I've spent
With love and string and sealing wax was physics kept alive
Let not the wealth of Midas hide the goal for which we strive.

In The Cyclotronist’s Nightmare (1947), he portrayed life in a cyclotron laboratory through farce. The laboratory director tells his graduate students that the president of the Reekanstinkle Fund is coming:

"Boys," said the Boss, "The President is coming here. The President of the Reekanstinkle Fund Giving all that money away is awfully tiring The doctor said the President was ripe for retiring, The doctor said he ought to take some activated iron, Eighty millicuries twice a day!"

He then orders the students to produce the activated iron overnight:

"Eighty millicuries by half-past nine!"

== Biography ==
Arthur Roberts was born July 6, 1912, in the Bronx, the son of an Austrian immigrant. In 1933, he got a piano diploma from the New York's Manhattan School of Music and a master's degree in physics from Columbia University.

During World War II, Roberts traveled to Britain while working on the development of radar technology with a team of Massachusetts Institute of Technology scientists.

After the war, Roberts was a professor at the University of Chicago physics department, and worked at the Argonne National Laboratory and Fermi National Accelerator Laboratory. He became a fellow of the American Physical Society. During the 1960s and 1970s he used to have occasional music jam sessions with eminent scientists and Nobel laureates who worked at the Brookhaven National Laboratory. He moved to Hawaii in the late 1970s.

Arthur Roberts died April 22, 2004, of Alzheimer's disease at his home in Honolulu.

== See also ==
- Tom Lehrer
