= Amabel Scharff Roberts =

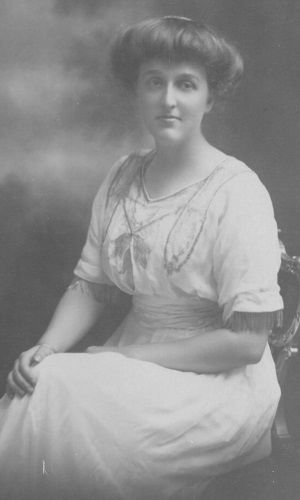
- Born: September 16, 1891; Madison, New Jersey
- Died: January 17, 1918 (aged 26); Étretat, France
- Education: Vassar College
- Occupation: Nurse

Amabel Scharff Roberts (1891-1918) was an American nurse who was the first nurse from the U.S. to die in France during World War I.

Roberts was born in Madison, New Jersey. She graduated from Vassar College in 1913. Roberts then went on to work and study at Columbia University's Presbyterian Hospital, completing her coursework there in 1916.

In 1917, Roberts traveled to Europe to join the war efforts as a reserve nurse under George Emerson Brewer's medical team from Presbyterian, along with 64 other nurses and 22 doctors. This position was, officially, part of the American Red Cross. Roberts was stationed at the American Base Hospital Number 2 at Étretat, on the coast of Normandy, working as head of one of the wards for wounded soldiers. The hospital was responsible for caring for American and British casualties of the war.

Roberts died in Étretat on January 17, 1918, from blood poisoning contracted in the course of her work on the surgery ward. Roberts died just one day before the American nurse Helen Fairchild, stationed at Base Hospital No. 10.

The VFW post #3662 in Madison was named in her honor on December 18, 1937.
