= Elizabeth Ann Roberts =

American model (born 1941)

Playboy centerfold appearance
- January 1958

Elizabeth Ann Roberts is an American model who was underage when photographed nude for Playboy.

== Career ==
Elizabeth was only 16 years old at the time her photos were taken as Playboy magazine's Miss Playmate for the January 1958 issue. She had arrived at the Playboy studio with her mother, who provided a written statement that she was 18. After it was revealed that Roberts was underage, Hefner was brought before a domestic relations court on a charge of contributing to the delinquency of a minor.

Elizabeth Ann Roberts	Cheryl Kubert	Zahra Norbo	Felicia Atkins	Lari Laine	Judy Lee Tomerlin
Linné Ahlstrand	Myrna Weber	Teri Hope	Mara Corday, Pat Sheehan	Joan Staley	Joyce Nizzari
