= Chris Roberts =

Chris Roberts may refer to:

- Chris Roberts (skateboarder) (born 1977), American skateboarder and podcaster
- Chris Roberts (baseball) (born 1971), American baseball player and coach
- Chris Roberts (chairman), ex-chairman of Torquay United Football Club
- Chris Roberts (video game developer) (born 1968), American video game designer, programmer, film producer, and director
- Chris Roberts (pilot) (born 1945), British former test pilot, and Red Arrows pilot
- Chris Roberts (singer) (1944–2017), German singer and actor
- Paul Roberts (cricketer) (Christopher Paul Roberts, 1951–1977), English cricketer
- Chris Ioan Roberts (born 1985), Australian actor
- Christopher B. Roberts, president of Auburn University

== See also ==
- Chris Douglas-Roberts (born 1987), American basketball player
- Chris Roberts-Antieau (born 1950), American artist
