= Carlo Bernardini =

Carlo Bernardini is the name of:

- Carlo Bernardini (artist) (born 1966), Italian artist
- Carlo Bernardini (politician) (1930–2018), Italian physicist and politician
