= Michael Moffett =

Michael Moffett may refer to:

- Michael Moffett (artist)
- Michael Moffett (politician)
