= Victor Koulbak =

French painter of Russian origin (born 1946)

- Born: March 12, 1946 (age 80)
- Occupation: Painter

Victor Koulbak (born 12 March 1946, in Moscow, Russia) is a French painter of Russian origin. His work is heavily influenced by Renaissance masters to contemporary art.

== Biography ==
=== Early childhood ===
As a child he was interested in art and drew frequently. His father was an air force pilot and his mother was a housewife. His mother eventually showed his work to the director of the Ecole des Beaux-arts in Moscow and he was admitted. The best drawings were shown in a window that gave onto the street. The first time one of his drawings was shown, he proudly asked his mother to come with him to see. Someone had broken the window and stolen his drawing. “This was my first artistic success” said Victor Koulbak.

=== At school with the Masters ===
At the end of his secondary school studies and his apprenticeship with the Beaux-arts, Koulbak realized there was a gap in his schooling. He decided to find a “Master” and stopped looking once he found a well-known artist. From the first day, however, the student argued with his teacher and left the workshop immediately: the master in question imposed his own style, his own aesthetic principles and personal vision, and brought nothing new from the technical point of view. The young artist then made the most important decision of his life: to discover by himself the principles and techniques of the old "Masters". At first he was impressed by Pieter Brueghel the Elder, Paul Cézanne and Vincent van Gogh, but then he soon turned to Leonardo da Vinci, Michelangelo, Albrecht Dürer, Jan van Eyck, Hans Memling, and others of great skill.

=== Soviet censorship ===
Refusing the dictates of official art: “Social Realism”, Koulbak put himself on the side of non-conformist painters, thus depriving him of lucrative orders. So, in order to survive, he was forced to work on illustrations for books and magazines. However, he continued to paint clandestinely, for himself and for a small group of friends, but everything became more and more difficult: art supplies were reserved for members of the Soviet Artists Union, and others had difficulty in procuring these necessities for their work. For example, in summer there would be no green available, and in winter there would be no white. To become a member of the Union, you had first had to have participated in two official exhibitions. The selection committees, who protected soviet realism, were exclusively made up of Party members totally faithful to the regime. This regime became slightly more flexible during the 1970s. Exhibitions were organized with debates and held in non-public spaces, such as the Institute of Nuclear Physics of the Academy of Sciences, but were only accessible to those holding a laissez-passer issued by the Party and the KGB. Koulbak was able under these conditions to hold two exhibitions, which were, however, closed after only two hours.

=== Stendhal's Syndrome ===
In 1975 Koulbak left the USSR. He then went to Vienna and stayed for six months, visiting all the wonderful museums of that city. The contemplation of Brueghel’s paintings put him into a trance, so much so that he was awoken by one of the guards at the closing of the museum. He had been in front of Brueghel’s work from 11.00 in the morning until the closing of the museum in the evening, victim of Stendhal syndrome, described by Stendhal in 1878 in his book Rome, Naples and Florence.

=== Sweden, France and Malta ===
Before leaving the USSR, Koulbak had sent several of his works to Sweden. He was invited by a gallery in Stockholm, and within one year had four exhibitions of his own in Helsingborg, Stockholm, Malmö, and Oslo. In 1976 he moved to Paris. Since then 25 personal exhibitions and numerous collective exhibitions have been dedicated to his art in France, Italy, Japan, Canada, Belgium, the United States of America, the United Kingdom, Germany, and Malta. Koulbak has been a resident of Malta since the year 2000.

== Body of Work ==
=== Periods ===
During his "exploratory" period in Moscow from 1965 to 1975, Koulbak experimented with all types, techniques and styles.

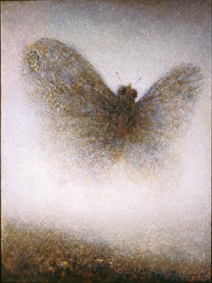
Butterfly (1971).

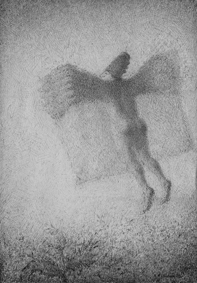
Icarus (1972).

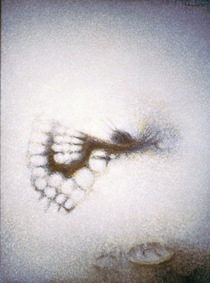
Mechanical Butterfly (1973).

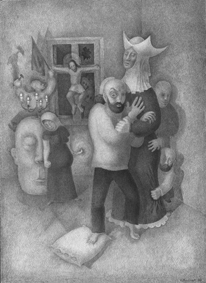
Celebration (1970).

« Surréalist » Stockholm then Paris, from 1975 to the 1980s

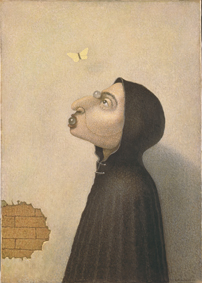
In Contemplation (1977).

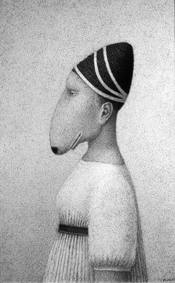
Metamorphoses (1977).

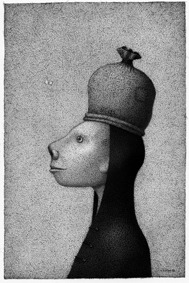
Traveller (1977).

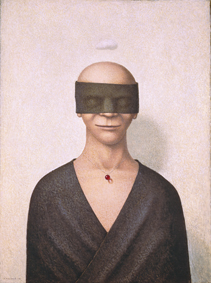
Meditation (1978).

« Thematic » Paris from 1980 to 1990.

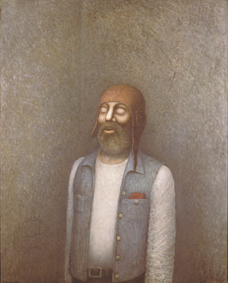
Pilot (1986).

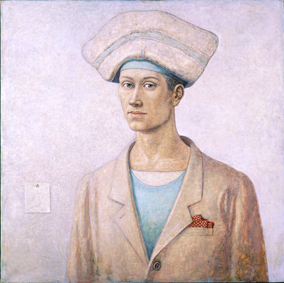
He did what he could but is still alone (1987).

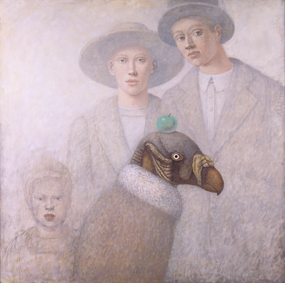
Destiny (1983).

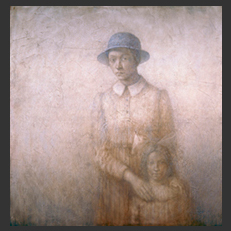
One would say that the father was bad (1985).

During his "Master’s" period in Paris, followed by Malta in the 1990s, Koulbak’s main body of work has been executed in silver point.

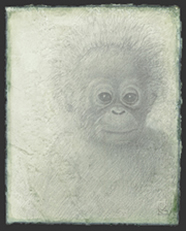
Green Monkey (2004)

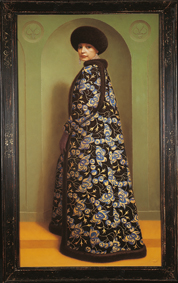
Portrait (2001)

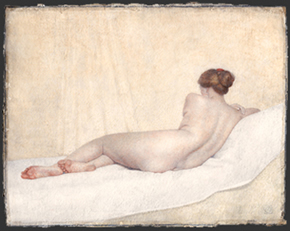
Nude n°4 (2006)

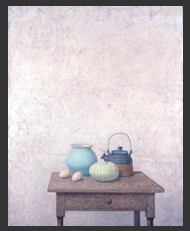
Outside still life (1987)

=== Techniques ===
Oil, gouache, watercolour, drypoint, pencil, silverpoint, and other great skills. Koulbak uses them all in the style of the Masters of the Renaissance, adapting them to his personal aesthetic concept.

=== Artistic Vision ===
"The Renaissance, says Victor Koulbak, represented the art at its summit. The artist, in his representation of man, aspired to the divine. And this could not be done without mastery. Neither before nor after this period did the artist achieve such heights. The history of art of following periods is just a derivation. God was at first replaced by man, and then by the painter himself as the individual placed in all his triviality at the centre of the universe. We have gone from adoration to exhibitionism. How did we get there? Art education as a whole needs to be re-evaluated. We give a brush to a student and tell him “express yourself” but would we ever think to suggest such a thing to a student of the piano? Why should it seem absurd for the piano and not for the arts? No, in order to make a child a real artist, he needs first to learn to distinguish the beautiful from the ugly and to master his tools, to teach him techniques in order to enable him to transform his weaknesses into qualities. And to achieve this, many years of hard and difficult work are required. If it is not done today, the future of our world seems to me to be very dark. By refusing beauty, we refuse civilization. I don’t know if beauty can save the world, but without beauty, the world will not survive."

== Solo exhibitions ==
- 1975 Sweden, Helsinborg, Briiska Galleriet
- 1976 Sweden, Stockholm, Grafikhuser Futura
- 1976 Sweden, Malmo, Galerie Leger
- 1976 Norway, Oslo, Galerie 27
- 1976 France, Paris, Galerie Etienne de Causans
- 1977 France, Paris, Galerie Etienne de Causans
- 1980 Japan, Tokyo, Galerie Takeishi
- 1981 France, Paris, Galerie Isy Brachot
- 1982 Canada, Toronto, Lavrov-Tannenbaum Gallery
- 1983 Belgium, Brussels, Galerie Isy Brachot
- 1984 France, Paris, Galerie Isy Brachot
- 1985 Japan, Tokyo, Isetan Gallery
- 1986 Italy, Rome, Studio S
- 1986 U.S.A., New York, Leslie Cecil Gallery
- 1987 Japan, Tokyo, Isetan Gallery
- 1988 U.S.A., New York, Leslie Cecil Gallery
- 1997 France, Paris, Cité des Arts
- 1999 U.S.A., Arkansas, Little Rock, Arkansas Arts Center
- 2000 U.S.A., New York, Beadleston Gallery
- 2000 U.S.A., Los Angeles, Jan Baum Gallery
- 2001 France, Paris, Musée de la Chasse et de la Nature
- 2002 U.S.A., New York, Beadleston Gallery
- 2002 Malta, La Valletta, National Museum of Fine Art
- 2004 U.S.A., New York, W.M. Brady & Co
- 2005 Great Britain, London, Portland Gallery
- 2007 U.S.A., New York, W.M. Brady & Co
- 2008 Great Britain, London, Portland Gallery
- 2009 Malta, La Valletta, National Museum of Fine Art
- 2009 Germany, Frankfurt am Main, Nathalia Laue Galerie & Edition
- 2013 USA, New York, Didier Aaron Gallery
- 2015 USA, Auburn, Alabama, Jule Collins Museum of Fine Art
- 2015, Great Britain, London, Didier Aaron Gallery
- 2016, USA, New York, Didieer Aaron Gallery

== Collective exhibitions ==
- 1976 France, Paris, Salon des Réalités Nouvelles
- 1976 R.F.A., Esslingen a.N., Kunstverein, «Nonkonformistichse russische Maler»
- 1976 France, Paris, Palais des Congrès, «La peinture russe contemporaine»
- 1977 Great Britain, London Institut of Contemporary Art, «Unofficial Russian Painters»
- 1977 Austria, Vienna, «Février russe»
- 1977 U.S.A., Washington, «Washington International Art Fair»
- 1977 Great Britain, London, Fisher Fine Art Limited, «The Figurative Approach 2»
- 1977 Italy, Venice, «La Biennale di Venezia»
- 1978 Japan, Tokyo, Musée d’Art Moderne de Tokio
- 1979 Belgium, Brussels, Galerie Isy Brachot
- 1979 Germany, Munich, «Grafeling»
- 1979 France, Paris, Galerie Bellint, « Les russes à Paris »
- 1980 Suisse, Lausanne, « Peintres russes »
- 1977—1984 France, Paris, Grand Palais, «Grands et Jeunes d’aujourd’hui»
- 1982 U.S.A., New York, « Bilan de l’Art Contemporain »
- 1982 U.S.A., Florida, Palm Beach, Norton Gallery
- 1982 U.S.A., Florida, Pensacola Museum of Art, «Silver Point in America»
- 1982 U.S.A., Arkansas, Little Rock, Arkansas Arts Center
- 1982 U.S.A., Massachusetts, Springfield, Museum of Fine Art
- 1984 Canada, Québec, « Bilan de l’Art Contemporain »
- 1988 U.S.A., Pittsburgh, Carnegie Mellon University
- 2000 U.S.A., Los Angeles, Jan Baum Gallery
- 2006 U.S.A., Savannah Georgia, Telfair Museum of Art
- 2008 Great Britain, London, Art London
- 2009 Austria, Vienna, Art Albertina
- 2010 Born in USSR made in France, Paris, France

== See also ==
=== Videos ===
- 2022 - Victor Koulbak and his art
- 2018 - Interview about his art, 1/2
- 2018 - Interview about his art, 2/2

=== Connected articles ===
- Portrait
- Pointe d'argent
- Кульбак Виктор
- Koulbak Victor

=== Bibliography ===
- René Huyghe, Les signes du temps et l’Art moderne, Flammarion,1985
- Gérard Xuriguera, Les Figurations, Éditions Mayer,1985
- S.Bazin, P.Nicolas, Koulbak, La jouissance apaisée des formes permanentes, Groupe Bazin, 1998
- Nicolas Bokov, Or d’Automne et Pointe d’Argent. Conversations avec Victor Koulbak, Les éditions Noir sur Blanc

=== External links ===
- Official site of Victor Koulbak
