= Borinquen Gallo =

Italian-Puerto Rican artist (born 1975)

- Born: 1975 (age 50–51); Rome, Italy
- Education: The Cooper Union for the Advancement of Science and Art, Hunter College
- Known for: Artist
- Style: Contemporary Art
- Website: borinquengallo.com

"Borinquen Gallo (born 1975) is an Italian-Puerto Rican artist currently based in New York City.

== Biography and career ==
When Borinquen Gallo was 13 she moved with her family from native Rome to New York City to volunteer as missionaries; they settled down in The Bronx.

Throughout her teens, she started studying arts. She earned a BFA from The Cooper Union for the Advancement of Science and Art and an MFA from Hunter College. Gallo is an Adjunct Associate Professor at Pratt Institute and works as an artist.

After an initial phase during which she trained as a painter, she turned to plastic artworks. Her installations are mainly focused on questioning the relationship with the environment and, according to the artist, their objective is to sensitize people about the need for an harmonious coexistence and respect for nature. Her works are mostly realized with such recycled materials as plastic bags, caution tapes and debris.

In 2016, Borinquen Gallo was selected along with Paul Jonas Ramirez by Percent for Art, a division of New York City's Department of Culture, for the commission of a public artwork for the upcoming 40th Precinct Station House in the Bronx. The building, to be built by Bjarke Ingles Group, is set to be completed in 2021.

=== Selected art fairs ===
- Scope Art Show Miami 2015
- Clio Art Fair, 2014 & 2015
- Governors Island Art Fair, 2016
- Volta, PlanB, 2019

=== Selected group exhibitions ===
- The Summer Art Festival 2014, Waterfall Mansion, New York, NY
- UPROOT, Smack Mellon, Brooklyn, NY, 2017

=== Selected solo exhibitions ===
- "Be(e) Sanctuary" Sunroom Project Space, Glyndor Gallery of Wave Hill, Bronx, New York 2017
- “Like a Jungle Orchid for a Lovestruck Bee”, Burning in Water gallery (currently Malin gallery), New York 2017

=== Selected museums exhibitions ===
- National Academy Museum and School, New York City (2014)
- Bronx Calling: The third AIM Biennial, Bronx Museum (2015)
- National Academy Museum and School, New York City (2015)
- “Creative Mischief 2016”, National Academy Museum and School, New York City
- “Creative Mischief 2017”, The National Academy of Design
- “Art, Artist & You”, Children's Museum of Manhattan, New York City (2019)
- “Inside art”, Children's Museum of Manhattan, New York City (2020)

== Awards ==
- 2009, Doris Liebowitz Art Educator Award
- 2010, Marion Netter Fellowship
- 2015, Sol Shaviro Award
