= Sculpture space =

Sculpture space may refer to:

- An art studio focused on sculpture
- A sculpture park
- Sculpture Space (Utica), a sculpture studio and park in upstate New York
