= Chris Roberts-Antieau =

American fiber artist

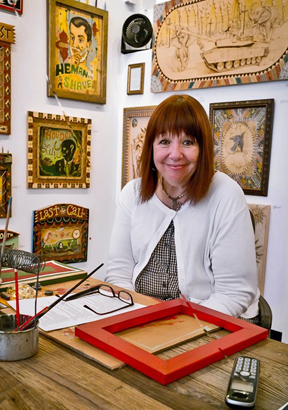
- Born: November 18, 1950 (age 75); Michigan, U.S.
- Known for: Fiber art
- Children: 1
- Website: Official website

Chris Lee Roberts-Antieau (born November 18, 1950) is an American fiber artist based in Michigan. She described her work as "embroidered tapestries", created with the use of fabric appliqué, thread painting, and hand embroidery. She also draws, paints, and creates mixed-media works.

== Early life and career ==
Roberts-Antieau was born and raised in Michigan. She learned to sew in her seventh-grade home economics class. She briefly enrolled in a high school art class, but eventually dropped out and did not attend college.

In the early 1980s, Roberts-Antieau began sewing three-dimensional sculptures of circus workers, trapeze artists, and male figures. She then took an appliqué class, where she learned to develop her pencil sketches and paintings into fabric art. As a clothing designer, Roberts-Antieau founded her own company with a staff of fifteen. She appliquéd her drawings onto fabric, creating a line of vests, jackets, and handbags.

By (date), Roberts-Antieau shifted her focus from clothing design to textile art. Current fabric works are made from freehand-cut cloth shapes enclosed within a glass painted frame. Her work has been described as "Embroidered Tapestries" — to represent its combination of fabric appliqué, thread painting, and hand embroidery.

She opened a gallery and frame shop in New Orleans, Louisiana, and with the gallery in her direct ownership, Roberts-Antieau had more control over the sale of her work and spent more time in her Ann Arbor, Michigan studio. After a breast cancer diagnosis, her work became more introspective and often focused on everyday experiences.

In 2017, Roberts-Antieau and her team traveled to Santa Fe, New Mexico for a pop-up experience. She opened a second gallery in Santa Fe where her works are displayed.

== Select exhibitions ==
- 2021 Healing And The Art Of Compassion (And Lack Thereof!) American Visionary Art Museum. Baltimore, MD
- 2019The Secret Life Of Earth: Alive! Awake! (and possibly really angry!). American Visionary Art Museum. Baltimore, MD
- 50th Jazz & Heritage Festival. Antieau Gallery, New Orleans, LA
- 2018 Parenting: An Art Without A Manual. American Visionary Art Museum. Baltimore, MD
- Mind and Hands. Gallery 81435. Telluride Arts District, Telluride, CO
- 2017 Ad Lucem. Gallery 81435. Telluride Arts District, Telluride, CO
- Hey Asheville. Horse + Hero, Asheville, NC
- Yum! The History, Fantasy and Future of Food. American Visionary Art Museum. Baltimore, MD
- Sunny's Calicoon Pop. Calicoon, NY
- Ephemeral Nature. Kohler Art Center. Sheboygan, WI
- The Big Hope Show. American Visionary Art Museum. Baltimore, MD
- The New Orleanian. Heron Arts. San Francisco, CA
- Two person Exhibition. Chelsea Underground Gallery
- Gumbo: A Celebration of Louisiana Art. Jeannie Taylor Folk Art Gallery. Sanford, FL
- 2015 Small Indignities. Red Truck Gallery. New Orleans, LA
- Louisiana Contemporary. Ogden Museum of Southern Art. New Orleans, LA
- Human, Soul & Machine: The Coming Singularity. American Visionary Art Museum. Baltimore, MD
- Hard Times in Mini Mall. Shooting Gallery. San Francisco, CA
- The Art of Storytelling: Lies Enchantment, Humor and Truth. American Visionary Art Museum. Baltimore, MD
- 2011 What Makes Us Smile. American Visionary Art Museum. Baltimore, MD

== Public collections ==
- UWF Pensacola Museum of Art, Pensacola, FL.
- American Visionary Art Museum, Baltimore, MD
- Boxing Hall of Fame, Canastota, NY
- House of Representatives, Washington, DC
- Smithsonian Museum of American Art, Washington, DC
- 21c Museum Hotel, Oklahoma City, OK
- 21c Museum Hotel, Durham, NC
- Art In Embassies

== Filmography ==
A Love Letter to Tom Waits: The Life of Chris Roberts-Antieau – A documentary about the life and work of Roberts-Antieau.

== Publications ==
- Sew Far: The Fantastic, Incredible and Amazing Life and Work of Chris Roberts-Antieau.
