= Esperanza Cortes =

Colombian-born American visual artist (born 1957)

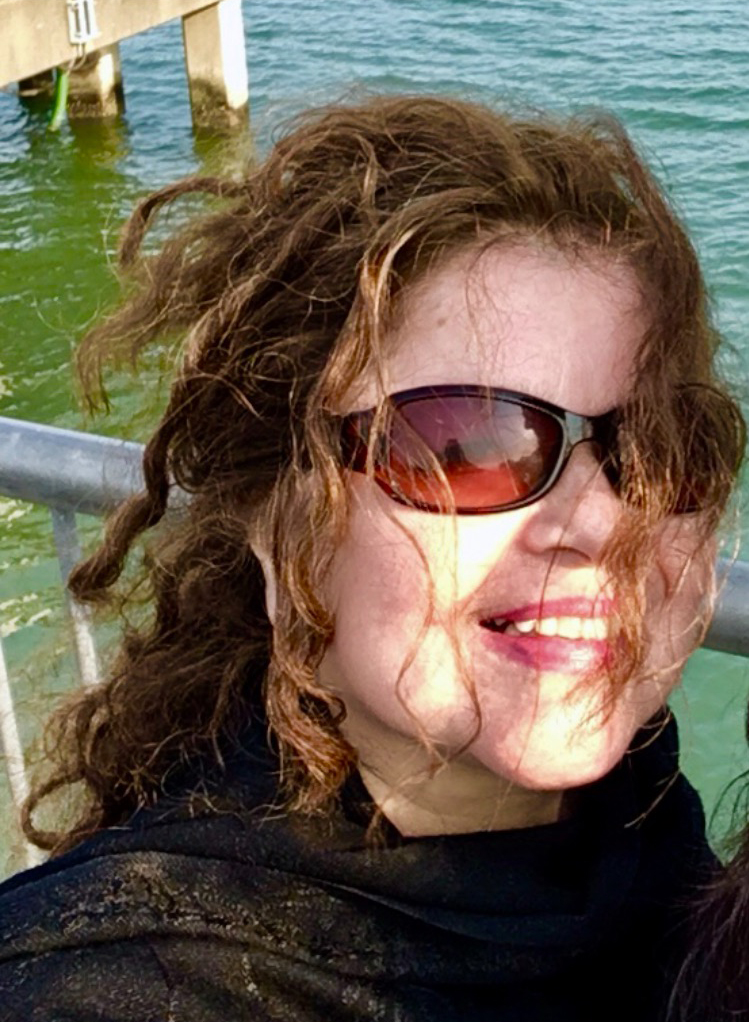
- Born: 1957 (age 68–69); Bogota, Colombia
- Known for: Multimedia, sculpture, installation
- Awards: 2018 Guggenheim Fellowship

Esperanza Cortés (born 1957) is a Colombian-born American visual artist who lives and works in New York City. Her paintings, sculptures and installations explore the themes of social injustice and cultural invisibility. She draws on the folk traditions of the Americas, including their rituals, music, dance and art.

== Early art 1990-2000 ==
Early on Cortés was spotted within the alternative New York art world as it sought art that would include a much broader demographic base and a more inclusive spectrum of styles and ideas. There was an incentive to go beyond the predominantly white, academically inclined gallery system that was firmly entrenched in Manhattan in the 1970s and 80's.

One such exhibition titled Bronx Spaces included an early Cortés work Wedding Suite, (1996) with its strings of flesh-colored roses and its sacrificial altar of a bed, making a cogent if oddly antiseptic statement about sexual servitude. Vivien Raynor said it could pass as a set design.

Holland Cotter again characterized art in the Bronx, as a resilient, clamorous, multifaceted thing, cosmopolitan in outlook but imbued with a spirit of place. His review of the Longwood Arts Project, an arm of the Bronx Council on the Arts and operating in a former public school in the South Bronx, noted that Cortes's labor-intensive sculptures were based on chains stitched from tiny glass beads and were the best in the show. Of one piece, suspended from the ceiling and hung with handmade amulets and charms, he noted its dense but attenuated presence.

At Wave Hill in the Bronx, the multipart sculptural installation Altar to Those Forgotten (2000) consisted of a heap of unglazed clay roses along with exaggeratedly long thorns on a table put in front of an abstract painting. The combined images were seen as ascending souls, perhaps spirits of Wave Hill.

== Solo exhibitions in the 2000's ==
Cortes has been exhibited nationally in galleries and museums including The Bronx Museum of the Arts, Queens Museum, El Museo Del Barrio, MoMA PS1, Socrates Sculpture Park, The Mexi-Arte Museum and Cleveland Museum of Art. Internationally, Cortes has also exhibited in Germany, Hungary, Slovakia, Poland, Japan, Mexico, Colombia, Dominican Republic, Spain and Greece.

Revelations (1996) was a survey exhibition at the Neuberger Museum of Art, Purchase, New York . Charm Bracelet (1996), a seminole installation in the show was made of frescos, roses, charms, and glass beads . Four painted images addressed the seemingly unresolvable pattern common to many abusive relationships: a lacerated pelvic area, a bruised mouth, a blood-stained and bruised eye socket, and a nipple contusion. Each was flanked by decorative charms. Dominick Lombardi stated, "Clearly, the trinkets are given to make the hurt go away; unfortunately, they come from the same source as the pain".

OJO II (2017) was exhibited at Art Basil Miami Beach. Meticulously painted and individually cut out are 500 eye portraits. Brown eyes, kind eyes, green eyes, evil eyes, blue eyes, sad eyes, blood shot eyes, even yellow eyes reveal the authenticity of individuals as recorded by Cortes.

Canté Jondo / Deep Song (2019) an exhibition at Smack Mellon NYC, presents installations that explore the injustice of the predatory gem and mineral excavation industry

== Fellowships and grants ==
Cortés is a recipient of fellowships and grants including: 2018 Guggenheim Fellowship; 2018 BRIC Media Arts Fellowship; 2018 Museum of Arts and Design - Artist Studios Residency; 2017 Lower Manhattan Cultural Council - Creative Engagement Grant: 2014 Joan Mitchell Foundation - Painters & Sculptors Grant; and 2013 Puffin Foundation - Project Grant.

== Residencies ==
Residencies include: Caldera - Artist Residency Program; BRIC Workspace - Visual Artist-In-Residence Program; Joan Mitchell Center Residency; Sculpture Space; Webb School of Knoxville; The Fountainhead; Brooklyn Children's Museum; Bronx Museum of Art - AIM Program; MoMA PS1 - International Studio Program; Bielska BWA Gallery, Poland; and Altos de Chavon, Dominican Republic.

== Collections ==
Cortés's work is in private and public collections including the American Embassy in Monterey, Mexico.
