= Irena Jůzová =

Czech sculptor

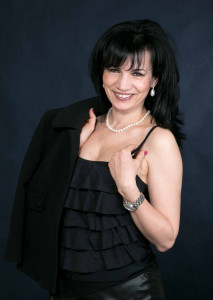
Irena Jůzová

Irena Jůzová (Hradec Králové, 10 June 1965) is a Czech sculptor. In 2007, she was the first artist to represent the Czech Republic at the 52nd Biennale of Modern Art in Venice, Italy, with her independent project. She became an associate professor at the Academy of Fine Arts in Prague in 2008.

== Life ==
Jůzová is a graduate of the Academy of Performing Arts in Prague. She also studied at and Professor Aleš Veselý's School of Monumental Art from 1990 to 1994, and worked as an assistant professor at the same school from 1995 to 2006. In 2008 she became an associate professor in the field of Visual Art – Intermedia Art at the Academy of Fine Arts in Prague (AFA). During her studies, she received several studio awards from the AFA and participated in many exhibitions. In 1992 at the European Biennale of Young Artists Germinations 7 in Grenoble, France, she received the award for the Best Interactive Work for her piece entitled Table for Twenty Players (1992). In 1993 she was selected by the AFA to participate in the 4th Biennale of European Academies of Visual Arts in Maastricht.

She has won a number of scholarships and participated in several residencies, such as at Sculpture Space in Utica, New York, Arts Links Residencies of LBMA Video Annex in Museum of Art Long Beach, California, and the Cité internationale des arts in Paris.

In 2007 she was the first artist to represent the Czech Republic at the 52nd Biennale of Modern Art in Venice, Italy, with her independent project. The work in the Series Collection was designed for the Czechoslovak pavilion in the Giardini di Biennale gardens. Her project was commended by the Czech Ministry of Culture at the National Gallery in Prague, which organized an exhibit of her work in 2008 in the Trade-Fair Palace, entitled Echoes of the Venice Biennale, which traced the origin of the long-term Series Collection project.

She has presented her current work in independent exhibits, such as Venice Screen, the Interactive Becher's Villa in Karlovy Vary in 2012, 16599, at the Klenová Palace, the Klatovy Klenová Gallery in 2011 and We Like Them Better Than Jewels, We Prefer Them Over Gold in the main hall of the Gallery of Modern Art in Hradec Králové in 2010–11. The Gallery of Modern Art published a catalogue of the exhibit, following Jůzová's work from 2007 to 2010 with colour reproductions and academic commentaries by Milan Knížák, Tomáš Vlček, Lucie Šiklová, Jiří Machalický, Lucie Jandová and Martina Vítková.

Jůzová received a scholarship endowed by the Jana & Milan Jelinek Foundation. With the support of the foundation, the interactive work Places I. (1993) was exhibited at the Media Art Biennale WRO 97 in Wroclav, Poland, and since 2006 it has been a part of the modern art collection of the National Gallery in Prague. Jůzová's work is part of various national and private collections in the Czech Republic and abroad, such as the Museum of Decorative Arts in Prague, the Gallery of Modern Art in Hradec Králové, AJG in Hluboká nad Vltavou, the Klatovy Klenová Gallery, and Shoes Or No Shoes?, Belgium.

She is currently involved in the ISWA 2011–2013 interdisciplinary international project supporting art, science and technology. As part of the project, she is creating new works from nanofibres and preparing an exhibit in cooperation with the Karlovy Vary Gallery of Art scheduled for 2014.
