= Gianluca Bianchino =

Italian-American artist (born 1977)

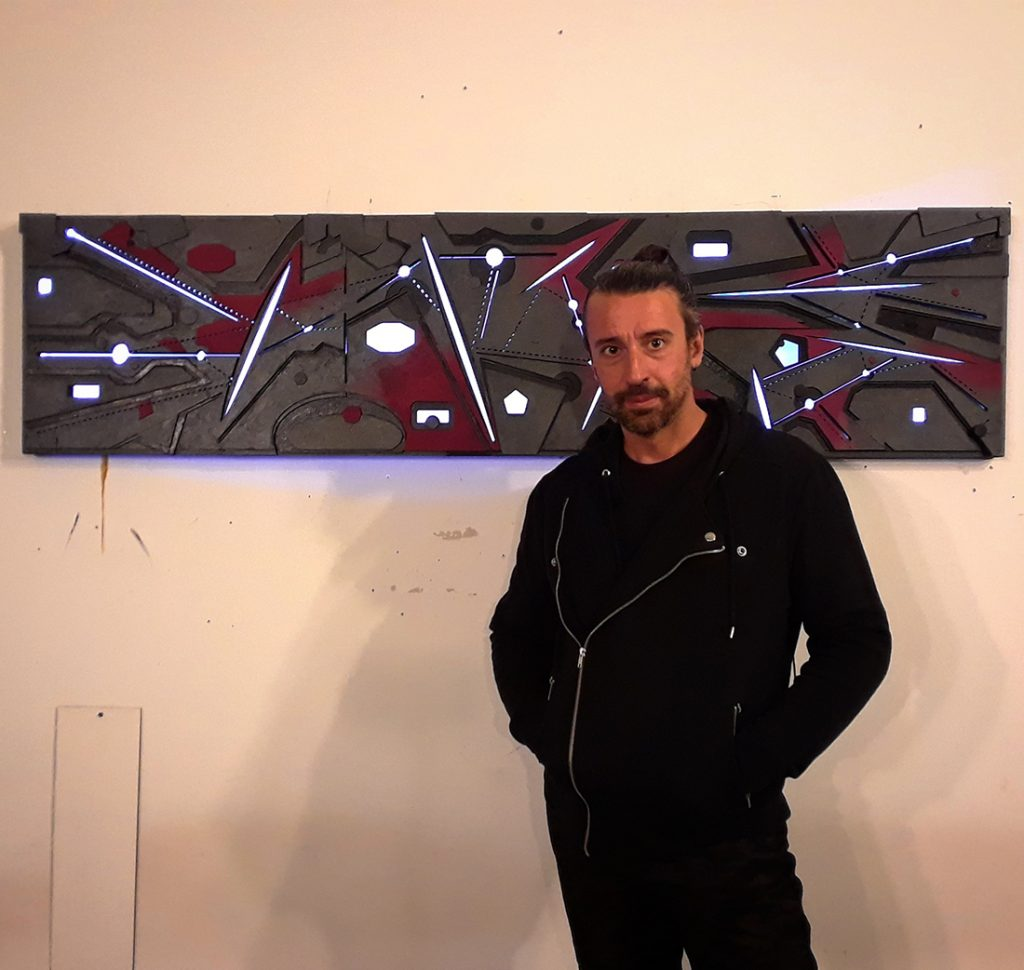
Bianchino in 2021

Gianluca Bianchino (born May 13, 1977) is an Italian-American artist born in Avellino, Italy. His family relocated to the United States as a result of the 1980 Irpinia earthquake. The earthquake had an indelible impact on his life, but more profoundly on his work, which often consists of overlapping spatial planes referencing geology, immigration and astronomy. His multi-media installations are a mix of repurposed materials, projected imagery, cast light, shadows and drawing which create three-dimensional illusions that play with the physical space of the gallery. His installations reside in spaces in which he considers the walls to be large, flat canvases upon which he adds textures in the form of tripods, lenses, telescopes, umbrellas, solar panels and lighting equipment. The assemblages suggest scientific research and exploration - especially the detritus left behind, decaying and floating miles above the earth. Playing with lights and cast shadows, he creates tangible futuristic spaces He lives and works in Newark, New Jersey.

== Education ==
As a teen Gianluca Bianchino attended the Instituto per Geometra Oscar D'Agostino, an architectural magnet school in his home in Avellino before relocating back to the United States. He later enrolled at New Jersey City University in Hudson County where he earned his bachelors of fine arts with a concentration in painting. He studied under Hugo Bastidas who influenced by conceptual process as a painter and artist. During his time studying in Jersey City, his mentor Ben F. Jones, was instrumental in his artistic development, challenging him to engage in experimental art-making approaches with a political bent. He later attended Montclair State University where he earned an MFA in 2011. He studied painting under Julie Heffernan before making the transition from painting to focus on sculpture and installation. In transitioning from painting to multi-media work, Bianchino was a video production assistant for Robert Whitman's "Passport" conceived for the 500 seat Alexander Kasser Theater at Montclair State University.

== Career ==
It was during his MFA at Montclair that he began focusing his attention from pure painting in oil on canvas to his current multi-media sculptural practice which integrates notions related to shifting space, ordered chaos and string theory which he attempts to explain visually. Writer Shannon Hall of Nautilus Quarterly likened his work to "an unchoreographed ballet" and notions of child-like wonder that permeates his work. Bianchino has numerous artist-in-residence appointments including Ramapo College of New Jersey and The Center for New Art at William Paterson University where he worked under the direction of Michael Rees an American sculptor who, like Bianchino, has a broad interdisciplinary practice that encompasses digital modeling and fabrication, video and performance. Other residencies include the Gilbertsville Expressive Movement (Gilbertsville, New York) and Gallery Aferro (Newark, New Jersey).

Bianchino's work was featured in a two-person exhibition with artist Lorrie Fredette at the Hunterdon Art Museum. The exhibition, "Through the Lens" looked at how the pair of artists incorporated scientific principles into their work. In 2016, Bianchino was selected as a resident artist at the Eileen S. Kaminsky Family Foundation based at Mana Contemporary in Jersey City, New Jersey. He was honored as a visiting artist at the Suzhou Culture and Art Centre in Suzhou, China in 2017 and invited to the R.A.I.D. Residency in Bologna, Italy later that same year. The artist's writing has been featured in the Brooklyn Rail, an independent journal dedicated to art, culture and politics, with a co-authored essay "Tortured Artists and Mad Scientists: Separated at Birth" which reflects on the synergies shared by artists and scientists. This essay was written in tandem with the symposium "Strange Attractors" at the CUE Art Foundation, moderated by artist/writer Taney Roniger.

In 2021, Bianchino exhibited his work at the Morris Museum a Smithsonian Affiliate in Morristown, New Jersey. The show was part of a series of kinetic works shown in association with the museum's Guinness Collection of automata founded by Murtagh D. Guinness, an heir to the Guinness Brewing Company. In 2022 Bianchino was recognized in the category of sculpture by the New Jersey Council on the Arts with an artist grant. In summer of 2023 Bianchino was awarded an artist residency at Sculpture Space in Utica, New York, one of the first residencies in the nation to focus solely on sculptors. That same year he was also featured in the Clio Art Fair in New York City's Chelsea Arts District. The fair was founded by Alessandro Berni, of Alessandro Berni Gallery of in Perugia, Italy. He is a member of the Sculptor's Guild, an organization one of the oldest artist-run organizations in New York City. Membership in this group is juried and usually by invitation only. He showed work in The Sculptor's Guild 80th Anniversary exhibition on Governor's Island in 2017 which was curated by John Yau. Bianchino was invited to Poornima University in Jaipur, India for Art Camp Sarjana 24, an international residency of artists and arts professionals which concluded with an exhibition at Jawahar Kala Kendra galleries with the other participants in December of 2024. This cultural exchange program included artists from South Korea, India, Italy, the United States and Ireland, among other countries.

In 2025, his site-specific video installation "An Attempt to Communicate with Reality" was featured in a solo exhibition at the Hunterdon Art Museum in Clinton, New Jersey. This video was originally created for Bianchino's solo exhibition for Gallery Bergen at Bergen Community College during the Covid-19 pandemic. The interactive installation was streamed on a live feed on social media during the period of lockdown in March of 2020. It featured interdisciplinary components including a dance performance and voice performance. Overall, the site-specific installation reflected on themes about the nature of human interaction in a world mitigated by technology, particularly robots and artificial intelligence. Bianchino's interests about artificial intelligence and creativity were cited in a subsequently written article by Robert A. Edgell in the publication, "Journal of Creativity." The global pandemic also provided opportunities for Bianchino to curate a series of 10 public video happenings, "Pandemic Projections" which were live streamed on Facebook and instagram during the spring months of 2020, at the height of the lockdown. These weekly video screenings were featured in art historian Annie Dell'Aria's 2021 book, "The Moving Image as Public Art: Sidewalk Spectators and Modes of Enchantment (Experimental Film and Artists' Moving Image)." Dell'Aria noted that the video screenings upheld community engagement in the arts during a period when institutions struggled to engage with audiences while closed to the public.

== Collections ==
- Walsh Gallery, Seton Hall University, South Orange, NJ
- Gilbertsville Expressive Movement, Gilbertsville, NY
- Eileen Kaminski Foundation (ESKFF)
- Mosaic Art Space, Long Island City, NY
