= Chris Ioan Roberts =

Australian-born actor, writer and director

Chris Ioan Roberts is an Australian-born actor, writer and director working in London.

== Biography ==
Chris Ioan Roberts is a graduate of the Victorian College of the Arts (Bachelor of Dramatic Art, 2010) and is an alumnus of The Watermill Center, New York, where he worked with celebrated American avant-garde director Robert Wilson. Whilst at the VCA he was the recipient of the Friends of VCA Award for his residency in New York. He trained originally as a dancer at the Victorian College of the Arts Secondary School.

He began professional international secondment as Creative Associate under Giuseppe Frigeni at the Opéra national de Paris on Robert Wilson’s production of Madama Butterfly in 2011. He has worked as assistant to the Director of The Royal Opera, and for director Marianne Elliott.

In review, his theatre work has been noted for its subversion, shock humour and political undercurrent as well as for its highly formal and often chaotic aesthetic.

He lives in London.

== Collaborators ==
Roberts is noted for his international focus as a theatre-maker and has most notably collaborated with London's Ovalhouse, writing, directing and performing in his play Dead Royal in 2015 as Wallis Simpson and Diana Spencer which was re-commissioned following a 2014 work-in-progress season. The work was subsequently invited to the Brisbane Festival and fortyfivedownstairs in Melbourne.

Other collaborations and appearances include work with Jia-Jen Lin (New York), MKA: Theatre of New Writing (Berlin), La Mama Theatre, Daniel Schlusser and Matt Scholten.
