= Saya Woolfalk =

American artist (born 1979)

- Education: Brown University; School of the Art Institute of Chicago, MFA
- Notable work: No Place, The Empathics, ChimaTEK
- Style: Afrofuturism
- Website: http://www.sayawoolfalk.com/

Saya Woolfalk (born 1979, Gifu City, Japan) is an American artist known for her multimedia exploration of hybridity, science, race and sex. Woolfalk uses science fiction and fantasy to reimagine the world in multiple dimensions.

Saya Woolfalk is represented by Leslie Tonkonow Artworks & Projects, New York. She was a graduate advisor at the Art Institute of Chicago and a BFA critic at Parsons School of Design in 2012. She was also a visiting artist at Montclair State University in 2012 and 2013. Woolfalk was an adjunct professor at Parsons from 2013 to 2018.

== Early life and education ==
Woolfalk was born in Gifu City, Japan, to a Japanese mother and a mixed-race African American and Caucasian father. She grew up in Scarsdale, New York and has described herself as "binational". As a child, her early childhood was spent in Japan along with frequent visits back to Japan after moving to the United States. She expressed that this "binational" background is very influential to her, making themes of hybridity very prominent in her work.

Woolfalk was educated at Brown University (B.A. Visual Art and Economics 2001) and earned her M.F.A. in Sculpture at the School of the Art Institute of Chicago in 2004. Woolfalk moved to New York in the 2006, to participate in the Whitney Museum of American Art Independent Study Program.

== Career ==
Since she served as an artist-in-residence at the Studio Museum in Harlem from 2007 to 2008, Woolfalk has exhibited her work at the Museum of Contemporary Art in Chicago, Studio Museum in Harlem, Frist Center for the Visual Arts in Nashville, Weatherspoon Art Museum, Greensboro, NC and the Contemporary Arts Museum in Houston. She also participated in PERFORMA 09 and collaborated with friend Clifford Owens in his solo exhibition at PS1/MoMA in New York.

Art critic Roberta Smith of the New York Times wrote in 2008 of Woolfalk's "Ethnography of No Place", that she developed with anthropologist and filmmaker Rachel Lears, “a little tour de force of performance, animation, born-again Pattern and Decoration, soft sculpture and anthropological satire.”

In the New York Times, art critic Holland Cotter wrote of Woolfalk's Empathics in her piece "Chimera", at Third Streaming Gallery in 2013, "These sculptural figures, with their blossom heads, are fantastic but, as with all fundamentally spiritual art, a complex moral thread runs through the fantasy". In an Art Talk with AMMO Magazine, Woolfalk said, "I create fictional worlds that are as immersive and full-scale as possible. I take elements from the real world and fold them into fantasy so that they are semi-recognizable to my viewers. My favorite part of building these places is when they start to almost make themselves. It gets really exciting when the logic of a project has become so clear that the project tells me what should happen next in the story."

Curator Lowery Stokes Sims wrote in a Real Art Ways catalogue in 2013 that "Woolfalk is single-handedly guiding us back to the original promise of modern art. Suprematism and Constructivism in Russia, De Stijl in the Netherlands introduced formal devices such the elimination or blunting of figural reference, the use of simple geometric shapes and primary colors in the belief that these encourage a transnational, un-xenophobic perspective that would lead us to open-minded future. Therefore we underestimate Saya Woolfalk at our peril, because it is conviction such as hers that can move cultures and shift the meta-narrative."

She has received awards including a Fulbright for research in Maranhão, São Paulo, in Rio de Janeiro, Brazil a Joan Mitchell Foundation MFA Grant and from the New York Foundation for the Arts Fellowship, an Art Matters Grant in 2007. She has been an artist-in-residence at the Newark Museum, University at Buffalo, Yaddo, Sculpture Space (Utica) and Dieu Donne Papermill. With funding from the NEA, her solo exhibition, "The Institute of Empathy," ran at Real Art Ways Hartford, CT from the fall of 2010 to the spring of 2011. Her first major solo exhibition at a North American museum opened at the Montclair Art Museum in October 2012.

== Work ==
Woolfalk wanted to create something that allowed people to think about cross-cultural relationships and hybridization. However, she did not want to use her personal story and background to do so. Instead, she created the world of the Empathics within her work. The Empathics are a fictional race of women who are able to alter their genetic make-up and fuse with plants. With each body of work, Woolfalk continues to build the narrative of these women's lives and questions the utopian possibilities of cultural hybridity. “Because I’m mixed race, I have this idea that to leave the conversation ambiguous is interesting,” she says. The Empathics were first on view at Woolfalks first solo show at the Montclair Art Museum in the fall of 2012.

=== No Place ===
No Place is a technicolor world depicted through dance, movement, video and sculptural objects. This work was developed out of Woolfalk's experiences studying performance and its intersection with spiritual practices in Brazil. She was with her husband, who was conducting anthropological research on descendants of escaped enslaved people and Woolfalk describes finding herself comparing her working methods to the scientific processes of her husband. In 2008, Woolfalk and anthropologist Rachel Lears gathered friends and asked them about their ideas of what a perfect utopia would be. They took those Ideas and intertwined them into what is now known as No Place.

=== ChimaTEK: Virtual Chimeric Space ===
This work has been included in the shows Enter the Mandala: Cosmic Centers and Mental Maps of Himalayan Buddhism at the Asian Art Museum, San Francisco in 2014 and Disguise: Masks & Global African Art at the Seattle Art Museum in 2015 and the Brooklyn Museum in 2016. She has cited sowei helmet masks produced by the Sande society in Sierra Leone as inspiration for this work because of how the female-centered community used these masks in masquerades and female initiation rituals.

== Influences ==
She draws upon sources as far-ranging as Japanese anime and African masks and textiles used in ritual ceremonies. The garments she designs to be worn in her video works filmed in her installations are often fusions of her various influences, attesting to her views of cultural hybridity.

In an interview for Huffington Post, she described her attitude towards cultural hybridity, "Although cultures do have important political utility, the idea that cultures develop in vacuums is false. Cultures really build on each other. American culture is a serious hybrid, an agglomeration of all of the different immigrant groups and nationalities. It’s [sic] history of European colonialism, slavery and Native American history made our culture what it is today."

Woolfalk also based the construct of cultural hybridity off her experience as a "binational" person. While growing up, she attended elementary school in Japan and learned about plants and their relationships to humans. From such a young age, she was taught that plants and humans are connected in many ways, which later contributed to the creation of The Empathics. In college, Woolfalk encountered the Kaki Tree project, which involved the single persimmon tree that survived the 1945 bombing of Nagasaki. This tree allowed intercultural exchanges to be made using its saplings, while also displaying that through pain and suffering a new, improved world emerge. This experience affected Woolfalk so much that she stated, "The structure and drives of this project impacted how I wanted to conceive my future work".

== Teaching and mentoring ==
In 2002, Woolfalk began teaching as a Teaching Artist for the nonprofit Publicolor in New York City. She then taught at Architreasures and the School of the Art Institute of Chicago the following year. In 2006, Woolfalk became a thesis advisor at the Minneapolis College of Art and Design. In 2007 she worked as a mentor at the New York Foundation for the Arts in New York City. Woolfalk was also a visiting artist at the University of Buffalo in 2009 and the University of Hartford in 2010, respectively. In 2012, she became a graduate advisor at the Art Institute of Chicago and a BFA critic at Parsons School of Design. She was a visiting artist at Montclair State University. She stayed a visiting artist at Montclair State University in 2013 and became an adjunct professor at Parsons School of Design where she held the adjunct professor position until 2018.

== Recognition ==
Woolfalk has been the recipient of the Joan Mitchell MFA fellowship, the New York Foundation for the Arts (NYFA) fellowship for cross-disciplinary and performance work, the Art Matters grant, the Franklin Furnace Fund Grant for performance art and the Deutsche Bank Fellowship Award. Woolfalk has also been an artist-in-residence at the Studio Museum in Harlem, the Newark Museum of Art, Dieu Donne Papermill in New York City, the Museum of Arts and Design, the Simons Center for Geometry and Physics in Stony Brook, New York, Smack Mellon in Brooklyn and Headlands Center for the Arts in California.

== Personal life ==
Woolfalk is the daughter of a Japanese mother and a biracial African American and Caucasian father. Her upbringing puts her in a position to chart an expanded definition of cultural diversity. She currently lives in Brooklyn, New York with her husband, the anthropologist Sean T. Mitchell and their daughter Aya. Woolfalk maintains an art studio in Manhattan.
