= Jimmy Kuehnle =

American contemporary artist (born 1979)

- Born: July 24, 1979 (age 46); Atlanta, Georgia
- Known for: Sculpture, Performance Art, Inflatables, Installation Art, Site-specific art
- Website: jimmykuehnle.com

James Edward Kuehnle (born July 24, 1979) is an American contemporary artist who lives and works in Cleveland, Ohio.

== Early life ==
Born in Atlanta, Georgia, in 1979, Kuehnle received a Bachelor of Fine Arts in sculpture from Truman State University in 2001, and a MFA in sculpture from the University of Texas at San Antonio in 2006.

== Career ==
Kuehnle is known for interactive inflatables, site-specific installations and public performances. He researched public art and sculpture as a Fulbright Graduate Research Fellow in Japan. He taught at the University of Texas at San Antonio, University of Alabama in Huntsville. Kuehnle is an assistant professor at the Cleveland Institute of Art.

His work has featured public performance art treks through rural and urban cities in the United States including Chicago, Illinois; Detroit, Michigan; Austin, Texas; Houston, Texas; St. Louis, Missouri; Cincinnati, Ohio; Cleveland, Ohio; San Antonio, Texas; Dallas, Texas; Pittsburg, Kansas and New York state, as well as performances in Japan, Italy and Finland.

In 2009 he worked as an artist in residence at the open air museum Ateljé Stundars in Vaasa, Finland. He worked in the studio as a resident artist at Sculpture Space in Utica, New York in 2010 as well as at Albion College in Albion, Michigan. In 2010, he exhibited in a survey of international artists in residence at the Fondazione Arnaldo Pomodoro in Milan. In 2013 he worked as a SWAP resident at SPACES in Cleveland, Ohio.

In 2014 Kuehnle was one of 102 artists included in the national survey exhibition State of the Art: Discovering American Art Now at the Crystal Bridges Museum of American Art. In 2016 he exhibited his first solo museum show Jimmy Kuehnle: Tongue in Cheek at the Hudson River Museum that included inflatable suits and site-specific illuminated inflatable sculptures. In 2016 he had a solo exhibition at the Akron Art Museum titled Wiggle, Giggle, Jiggle.

== Awards ==
In 2015, he received a Creative Workforce Fellowship from the Community Partnership for Arts and Culture.
