= Anna Mlasowsky =

German glass artist

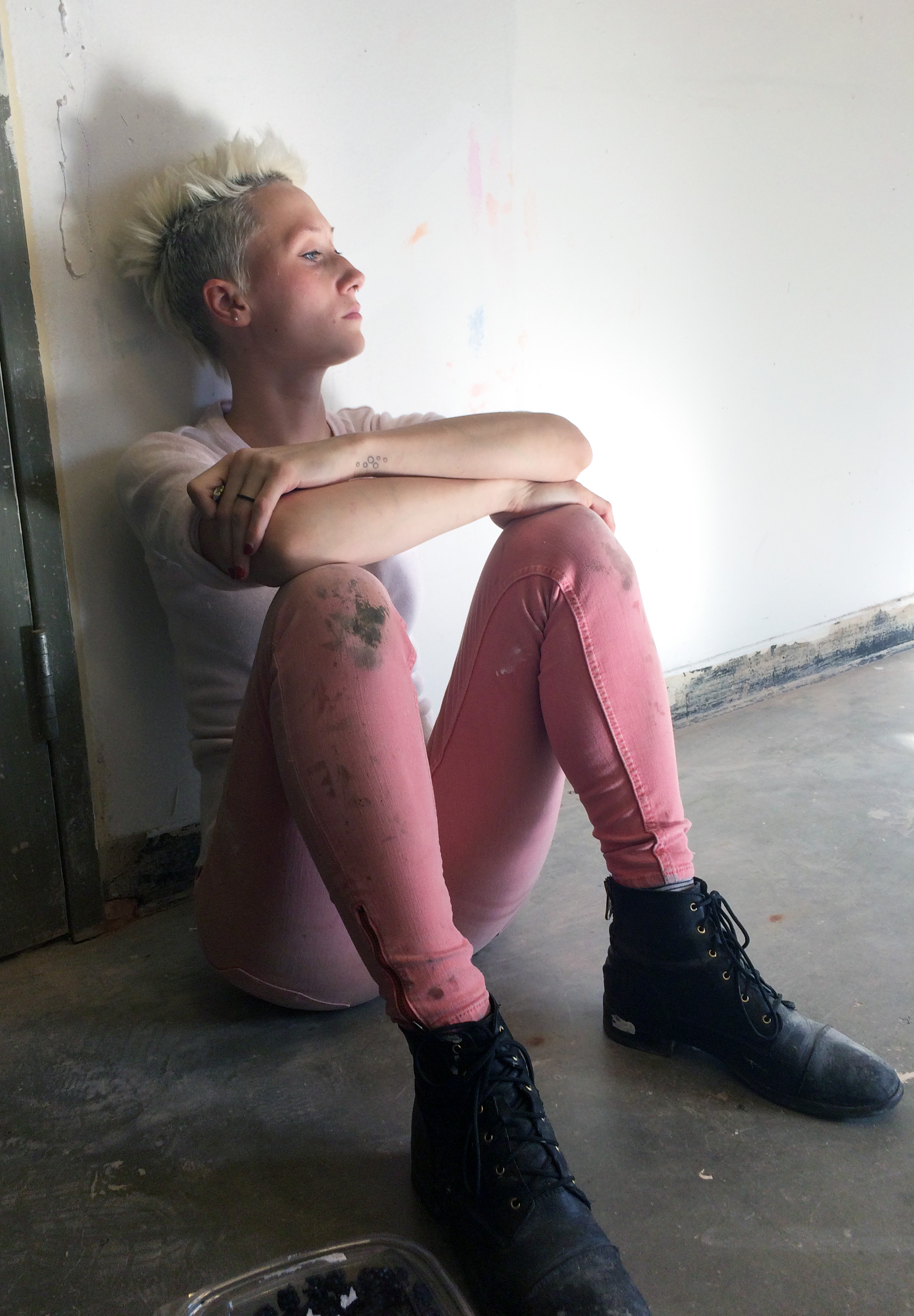
Anna Mlasowsky

Anna Mlasowsky (born 1984) is a German artist. She is known for her experimental and boundary pushing work in glass and is recognized as one of the leading female artist working in glass today.

Her work has been shown at the Museum of Art and Design New York, the European Museum for Contemporary Glass, the Museum of Northwest Art, the Bellevue Arts Museum, the Glass Factory Museum in Boda, Sweden, the Tacoma Museum of Glass, USA and the Stockholm Architecture Museum in Sweden.

Her work has been featured in American Craft, the Shanghai Museum of Glass Magazine, PBS Discovery Channel Canada, and Half Cut Tea.

Her work is held in the permanent collections of the Corning Museum of Glass (USA) the Toyama Glass Art Museum (Japan), the Castello Sforzesco in Milan (Italy), the Museum of American Glass (USA) the Glasmuseum Ebeltoft(Denmark) the European Museum of Modern Glass (Germany) and the Seto City Art Museum (Japan).

== Biography ==
Mlasowsky grew up in East Germany and first encountered glass makers in 2005, while traveling in northern Norway during her European Volunteer Service there. She saw glass makers working in a small village on the Lofoten Islands and the following year she enrolled to study glass at Engelsholm Højskole in Denmark. She completed a Bachelor of Arts degree at the Royal Danish Academy of Fine Arts in Glass, in 2011.She has worked as an independent artist, educator and curator since.

In 2016 she completed a Master of Fine Arts in sculpture from the University of Washington. She currently lives and works in Seattle, WA, USA.

Anna received an Artist Trust Fellowship in 2017, was one of the Emerging Voices in Craft Shortlist Award recipients and was awarded an Emerging Artist residency at Centrum Foundation. In 2018 she received the Aldo Bellini Award, the John and Joyce Price Award of Excellence and was a Museum of Art and Design Burk Prize finalist.

In 2021–2022, Mlasowsky is a Haas Short Term Fellow and Artist in residence at the Science History Institute, studying the history of rare earths. used in Glass today, the socio-ecologic impact of their extraction, and the way they enable a globalized society.

== Awards ==
- 2021 Silver Prize, Toyama International Glass Prize, Japan
- 2019 Chihuly Emerging Artist Award, Seattle, USA
- 2019 Windgate Award, Suny Purchase College of Art, New York, USA
- 2018 Aldo Bellini Prize, Castello Sforzesco, Milano, Italy
- 2018 Finalist: Burke Prize, Museum of Art and Design, NY
- 2018 „BAM“, Biennial John and Joyce Price- Award of Excellence, Bellevue Arts Museum, USA
- 2017 Jurors Choice Award, Annual International Irvin Borowksy Prize in Glass, USA
- 2017 Finalist: Emerging Voices in Craft Awards, American Craft Council, USA
- 2015 Punch Gallery Award, Members Choice Award, USA
- 2014 Page Hazelgrove Annual Award, Massachusetts Institute of Technology, USA
- 2014 TAG Grant, Award for Advancement of Technology in Contemporary Glass, USA
- 2014 Silver Award Winner: Emerge Competition, Bullseye, USA
- 2014 Otto Waldrich Prize, Coburg Glass Prize, Germany
- 2013 UK Glass Prize, 1. Preis, England
- 2011 Glasmuseum Ebeltoft, Projekt Award, Denmark
- 2011 Finalist: Stanislav Libenski Award, Tschechien
- 2011 Finalist: European Advancement Award for young Glass, Stadtmuseum Zwiesel, Germany
- 2010 Kaleidos Award, Upsala, Schweden

== Grants ==
- 2021 Haas Short Term Research Fellowship, Science History Institute, Philadelphia, USA
- 2021 Artworks Archive, Accelerator Grant, USA
- 2021 Awesome Foundation Grant, for “Das Schaufenster“, USA
- 2020 COVID-19 Relief Grants: The Artist Fellowship, Seattle Artist Relief Fund, Foundation for Contemporary Art, 4Culture Artist Relief, Artist Relief Project
- 2020 SmArt Venture Grant, Office Of Arts and Culture, Seattle, USA
- 2019 4Culture, Project Grant, Seattle, USA
- 2019 Scholarship Pilchuck Glass School, Seattle, USA
- 2017 Artist Trust Fellowship, USA
- 2016 Artist Grant, Vermont Studio Center Residency, USA
- 2015 Scholarship, Glass Art Society, USA
- 2015 Scholarship, Puget Sound Group of Northwest Artists, USA
- 2013 IASPIS Grant, Swedish Ministry for Arts and Culture, Sweden
- 2012 Scholarship, Pilchuck Glass school, USA
- 2012 Artist Grant, Alexander Tutsek Stiftung, Germany
- 2011 Penland school of Craft: Isaac & Sonia Luski Scholarship, USA
- 2010 Danske Nationalbankens Jubilaeumsfond af 1968, Denmark
- 2009 Augustinus Fonden, Denmark
- 2009 Student scholarship University of Art and Design, Helsinki, Finland
- 2008 Scholarship Pilchuck Glass School, USA
- 2009 Scholarship, The Corning Museum of Glass scholarship, USA
- 2009 Artist Grant, Ingenör Vald. Selmer Trane og hustru Elisa Tranes Fond, Denmark
- 2009 Artist Grant, Krista & Viggo Petersens Fond, Denmark

== Residencies ==
- 2022 Tacoma Museum of Glass, Glass Studio Residency Program
- 2021 Haas Short-Term Fellow and Artist-in-Residence at the Science History Institute, USA
- 2021 Visiting Artist residency Tyler School of Art, Glass Department, USA
- 2021 Innovators in Glass Residency, Pilchuck Glass School, USA
- 2020 Artist in Residence, Urban Glass, NY University and Pratt Institut New York, USA
- 2019 Windgate Artist in Residency, Suny Purchase College of Art, New York, USA
- 2018 Sculpture Space (Utica) Residency, USA
- 2018 Visiting Artist, University of Hawaii Manoa, Oahu, USA
- 2017 Emerging Artist Residency Centrum Foundation, Port Townsend, USA
- 2017 Vermont Studio Center Residency, Johnston, USA
- 2016 Corning Incorporated Specialty Glass Residency, Corning, USA
- 2014 Bullseye Resource Center Bay Area Artist in Residence, Emeryville, USA
- 2013 Artist in Residence, Pittsburgh Glass Center, PA, USA
- 2013 Artist in Residence, The Glass Factory Museum, Boda, Sweden
- 2013 The Corning Museum of Glass Studio Residency, Corning, USA
- 2013 AA2A residency Program, National Glasscenter, University of Sunderland, UK
- 2012 International Ceramic and Glass Art Exchange Program, Seto, Japan
- 2011 Wheaton Arts and Cultural Center, CGCA residency Fellowship, NJ, USA
- 2011 Toyama City Institute of Glass Art residency, Toyama, Japan

== Selected public lectures and performances ==
- 2021 Lecture: “Anders-artig-keit”, Konstfack University of Arts & Design, Sweden
- 2021 Lecture: “Enabeling Transparency” für das Symposium “Craft Ways-Tending through Craft” Center for Craft and the Warren Wilson College, USA
- 2019 Host of the Paneldiscussion: Suny Purchase College of Art, NY, USA, on issues faced by female immigrant artists in the US (invited speakers: Sera Boeno, Roxana Fabius, Katya Grokhovsky, Yulia Topchiy)
- 2018 Lecture: “Behind the Glass“, Corning Museum of Glass, NY, USA
- 2018 Live-Performance: Bellevue Arts Museum, USA, “Chorus of One”, collaboration with Alethea Alexander and Alexandra Bradshaw-Yerby (University of Washington Dance Department)
- 2018 Lecture: American Craft Council Salon Series, Minnesota, USA
- 2017 Lecture: “Technology Advancing Glass”, Glass Art Society, Norfolk, USA
- 2016 Paneldiscussion: “Technology in Art” Panel, Atoms and Bytes Exhibition, Bellevue Art Museum, USA
- 2016 Live-Performance: “Straight Line Thinking”, University of Washington, USA
- 2015 Paneldiscussion: „kilnforming and new developments“ Bullseye Projects, Portland USA
- 2015 Live-Performance: of △▽ with Ellen Jing Xu, Velocity Dance Center, Seattle, USA
- 2015 Live-Performance: “Lineage”, Per4m4rum, University of Washington, USA
- 2014 Lecture: „Page Hazelgrove Lecture“, Massachusetts Institute of Technology, Boston, USA
- 2012 Lecture: „Emerging Artist Lecture“, Glass Art Society, Toledo, USA
- 2012 Lecture: Program-Seto City Art Museum, Seto, Japan
