= Jayoung Yoon =

South Korean artist (born 1979)

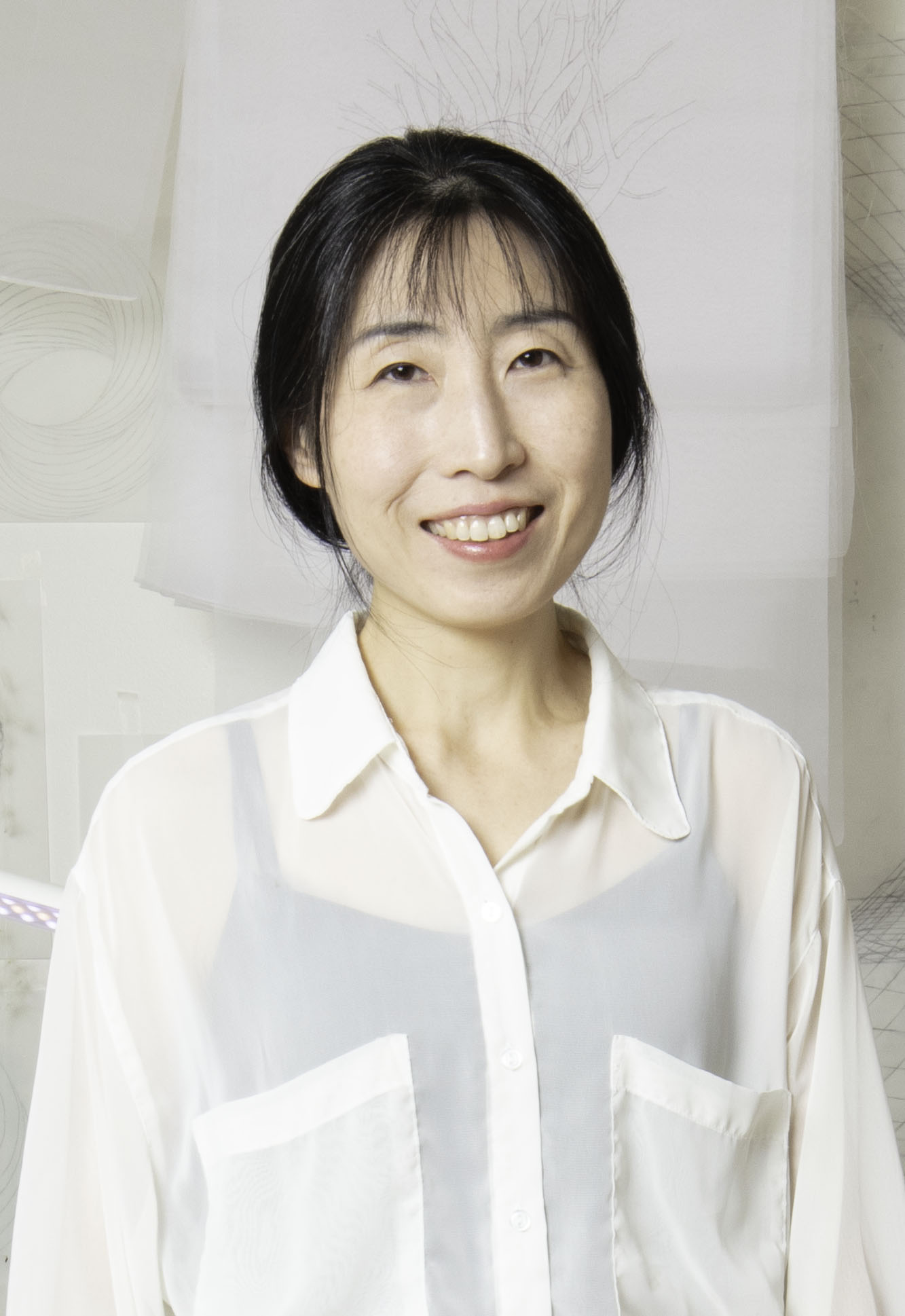
- Born: June 14, 1979 (age 47); Seoul, South Korea
- Education: Hongik University; Cranbrook Academy of Art
- Known for: Sculpture, Textiles, Video, Performance
- Website: https://www.jayoungyoon.com

Jayoung Yoon (Korean: 윤자영; Hanja: 尹慈永; born 1979) is a South Korean artist whose primary medium is human hair. Her work includes sculpture, performance, video, and two-dimensional works, and draws on Christian and Buddhist philosophy, and Korean cultural traditions. She received the Joan Mitchell Fellowship in 2023 and has been exhibited internationally in the United States, South Korea, the United Kingdom, and the Netherlands. Yoon lives and works in Beacon, New York.

== Early life and education ==
Yoon was born and raised in Seoul, South Korea. She earned a Bachelor of Fine Arts and a Master of Fine Arts from Hongik University in Korea and moved to the United States in 2006. In 2009, she received a Master of Fine Arts in fiber arts from Cranbrook Academy of Art in Michigan, where she first began using human hair as an artistic medium.

== Work ==
=== Materials and themes ===
Yoon has described human hair as a bridge between the physical and spiritual realms, and uses it as her primary material. She hand-knots or weaves lengths of hair into semi-transparent sculptural forms and two-dimensional geometric images. The resulting structures move with changes in airflow. Her work draws on Christian and Buddhist philosophy, and other spiritual traditions. She also works with feathers and milkweed seed fiber, and has incorporated traditional Korean horsehair weaving techniques, which she studied on Jeju island, South Korea.

=== Sculpture ===
Web of Life (2015–2017), nine feet in diameter, is composed of hand-made knots using hair from immediate and extended family members. The Form and Emptiness series (2015–2017) consists of woven mesh boxes hung from the ceiling, each containing a geometric shape at its center, all woven from strands of human hair. The Skull (2016), made from hair and glue, reflects on mortality and life cycles; according to the artist, "The skull represents the cycles of life and death and the transparent feeling of the hair sculpture represents temporality..." Offering Bowl #7 (2022) incorporates hair collected from her mother.

=== Performances and video ===
Yoon's performances often involve extended exposure to the elements. Listen to the Mind I (2009) condensed ten hours of footage into a timelapse 9 minute video in which Yoon lies still with a hair funnel extending from her ear, while exposed to the changing sunlight throughout a day. Non-Ego (2010) is a video in which Yoon places eleven large pots, each roughly the size of her body, in a circle and positions herself as the twelfth point before stepping outside it. Umbicality (2012) uses hair to connect the body to open air and sky. In 2012, she presented Clearing the Mind, a performance at Deep Tanks gallery, Staten Island.

== Recognition ==
In 2025, Yoon was selected for a residency at the Museum of Arts and Design in Manhattan. She has also attended residencies at MacDowell in New Hampshire, Skowhegan School of Painting and Sculpture in Maine, Anderson Ranch Arts Center in Colorado, and Sculpture Space in New York. She received the Joan Mitchell Fellowship in 2023, as well as the BRIC Media Arts Fellowship, the Franklin Furnace Fund, and the Ora Schneider Regional Residency Grant. Her work has been exhibited at the Bronx Museum of the Arts, the San Jose Museum of Quilts & Textiles, the Delaware Center for Contemporary Art, the Coreana Museum of Art, and the Seoul Olympic Museum of Art. It has been covered in The New Yorker, The Paris Review, and Fiber Art Now.

== Critical reception ==
Writing in the Ithaca Times, Arthur Whitman described Yoon's approach as phenomenological, concerned with perception and embodied experience. In Artnet News, Sarah Cascone wrote that the works initially resemble an unwoven window screen before closer inspection reveals them to be made of hair, calling them unsettling in their unexpected beauty. The Poughkeepsie Journal noted that one piece stopped nearly every visitor for extended consideration. Alex Moore, writing in the Paris Review, described Yoon's practice as sitting at the point where asceticism and aesthetics meet.

== Selected fellowships and grants ==
- NYSCA/NYFA Artist Fellowship (2026)
- Joan Mitchell Fellowship (2023)
- AHL Foundation Artist Fellowship (2020)
- MacDowell Fellowship (2018)
- Ora Schneider Regional Residency Grant (2017)
- The Bronx Museum AIM Fellowship (2016)
- BRIC Media Arts Fellowship, Brooklyn, New York (2014)
- The Franklin Furnace Fund for Performance Art (2010)

== Selected artist residencies ==
- Museum of Arts and Design's Artist Studios program (2025-2026)
- Millay Arts, Austerlitz, New York (2019)
- MacDowell, Peterborough, New Hampshire (2018)
- Saltonstall Foundation Artist-in-Residence, Ithaca, New York (2017)
- I-Park Foundation Artist-in-Residence, East Haddam, Connecticut (2013)
- Sculpture Space, Utica, New York (2011)
- Skowhegan School of Painting and Sculpture, Madison, Maine (2009)

== Selected exhibitions ==
Yoon's work has been exhibited in numerous solo and group shows at museums, galleries, and art institutions across the United States and internationally.

=== Solo exhibitions ===
- Perceiving Emptiness, Rose Lehrman Art Gallery, HACC, Harrisburg, Pennsylvania (2023)
- Sowing Seeds of Emptiness, Garrison Art Center, Garrison, New York (2022)
- Seeing the Threshold, San Jose Museum of Quilts & Textiles, San Jose, California (2018)
- Ephemerality, Theo Ganz Studio, Beacon, New York (2016)

=== Group exhibitions ===
- INhairITANCE, Art For The Soul Gallery, Springfield, Massachusetts (2026)
- Shaping Identity: Korean Print in Diaspora, Atlanta Contemporary, Atlanta, Georgia (2025)
- Intersections & Diversions, Strohl Art Center, Chautauqua, New York (2025)
- Don't Touch My Hair, Hannah Traore Gallery, New York, New York (2024)
- Interlacement, The Korea Society, New York, New York (2021)
- The Day After, Culture House, Washington, D.C. (2021)
- Hair: Textures of Belonging, Studio 3 Gallery, University of Kent, Canterbury, United Kingdom (2020)
- Materialized, Hampden Gallery, UMass Amherst, Massachusetts (2019)
- Fiberart International 2019, Contemporary Craft, Pittsburgh, Pennsylvania (2019)
- Hand/Eye, Form & Concept, Santa Fe, New Mexico (2018)
- Sutures, Marc Straus, New York, New York (2018)
- Multilayered: New Prints 2018/Summer, Print Center New York, New York (2018)
- The ArtsWestchester 2018 Triennial, ArtsWestchester, White Plains, New York (2018)
- Bronx Calling: The Fourth AIM Biennial, The Bronx Museum of the Arts, New York, New York (2018)
- CICA Experimental Film and Video, Czong Institute for Contemporary Art, Gyeonggi-do, Korea (2016)
- Portal Art Fair, Federal Hall, New York, New York (2016)
- Threaded, Flatiron Project Space, School of Visual Arts, New York, New York (2016)
- The 11th Busan International Video Art Festival, Busan, Korea (2014)
- East and West: Asian Influence on Contemporary American Craft, Ohio Craft Museum, Columbus, OH (2013)
- Sacred Vision, Separate Views, Tibet House US, New York, New York (2012)
- Show me your hair, Coreana Museum of Art, Seoul, Korea (2011)
- Hair Tactic, Jersey City Museum, Jersey City, New Jersey (2010)

=== Collections ===
- Richardson Family Art Museum, Wofford College, Spartanburg, South Carolina
- Kimmel Harding Nelson Center for the Arts, Nebraska City, Nebraska
