= Clio Art Fair =

American contemporary art fair

- Status: active
- Genre: Art Fair
- Frequency: Biannually - May and September
- Locations: New York City, United States
- Inaugurated: 2014
- Founder: Alessandro Berni
- Website: clioartfair.com

Clio Art Fair is an international contemporary art fair staged bi-annually in New York City, USA. It focuses on independent visual artists, without any exclusive NYC gallery representation.

The purpose of the fair is to bring together artists and curators, collectors and art critics without any long term mediator.

== History ==
Clio Art Fair was started in 2014 by art dealer and philanthropist Alessandro Berni. The name comes from Clio or Kleio, one of the nine muses in Greek mythology, representing history. Etymologically derived from the Greek root κλέω/κλείω: “to celebrate,” or “to make famous.”

During its inaugural year, it displayed 33 artists representing 16 countries. In 2017, three years after its founding, the fair became bi-annual. In 2018, the fair moved to 335 west 35th street, New York, NY allowing it to expand both its exhibitor base and floor space. In 2019 and 2020 the fair was hosted at 550 West 29th street, New York, NY 10001. The October 2020 edition was suspended because of the COVID-19 emergency.

Clio Art Fair came back with its twelfth edition in September 2021 and then again in September 2022, leaving the pandemic behind its back.

=== Special projects ===
- I want to go home, a section about the human migration topic. Curated by Asya Rotella, and happened during Clio Art Fair March 2019. Including works of: Michelangelo Pistoletto, Gilbert Salinas, Laura Mega and PonieO, among others.
- A nest watching an avalanche, a section about the environmental care. Curated by Misha Capnist and happened during Clio Art Fair Edition March 2020. Including works of: Thirza Cuthand (Whitney Biennial 2019), Giorgio Guidi, Minjin Kang, Jong Yong Yang and Tricia Healy, among others.
- Canary in the Coal Mine: The People’s Art of Protest, (september 2021). Curated by Garon Willie, and featuring artists including Aisha Tandiwe Bell, Amir Diop, and Al Diaz among others.
- Maybe I am Your Mother, Who is Generating Who?, a section on the topic of technology's influence in everyday life. Curated by Asya Rotella and happening during Clio Art Fair, September 2022. Including works by: Formento & Formento, Robert Obier, Denny Theocharakis, among others.

=== Selected hosted artists ===
- Vito Acconci
- Nina Berman
- Zana Briski
- John Coplans
- Thirza Cuthand
- Borinquen Gallo
- David Hayes
- Pino Pascali
- Michelangelo Pistoletto
- Michael Moffett
- Gianluca Bianchino
