= Carlo Bernardini (artist) =

Italian artist

Carlo Bernardini (born 1966) is an Italian artist.

== Life ==
Born in Viterbo, he received a diploma at the Fine Arts Academy in Rome in 1987. In 1997, he wrote the theoretical essay on The division of visual unity, which was published by Stampa Alternativa. In 2000 and 2005, he received a grant "Overseas Grantee" from the Pollock-Krasner Foundation of New York, and in 2002, the prize Targetti Art Light Collection “White Sculpture”. He was a resident at Sculpture Space in 2002.

He works with optic fiber since 1996; he has created and installed permanent public sculptures in stainless steel and optic fibers in various Italian cities, and in 1996 and 2003 he has installed site specific works at the XII and XV Quadriennial National of Rome.

He currently teaches at the Fine Arts Academy of “Brera” in Milan. He lives and works both in Rome and Milan.
