= Michael Moffett (artist) =

American shock artist

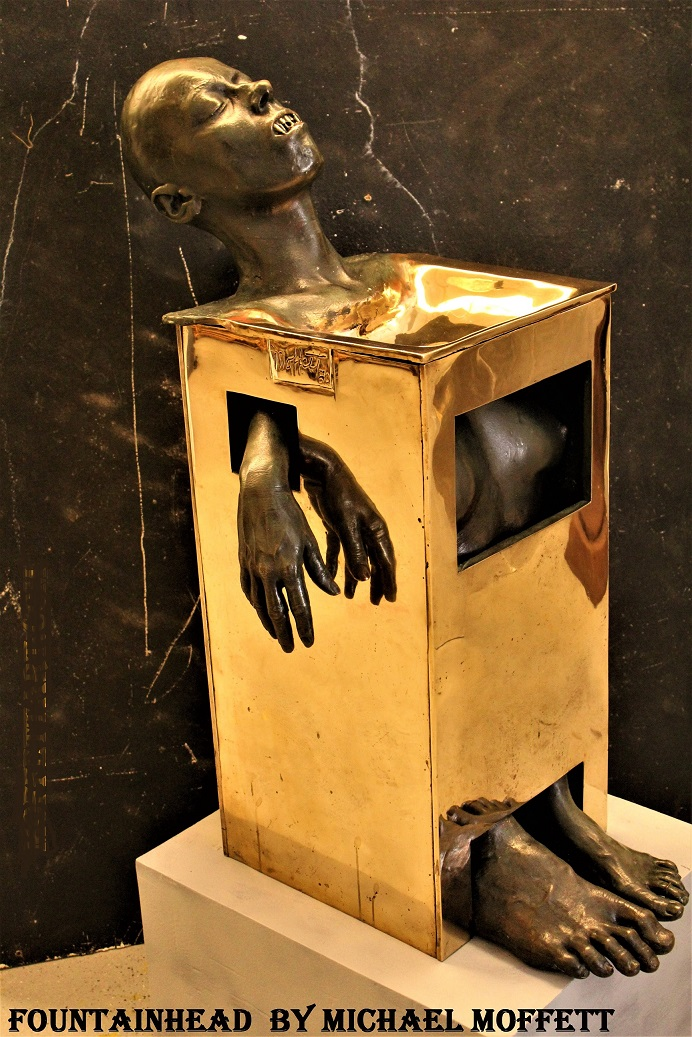
Fountainhead (1980), Bronze Sculpture

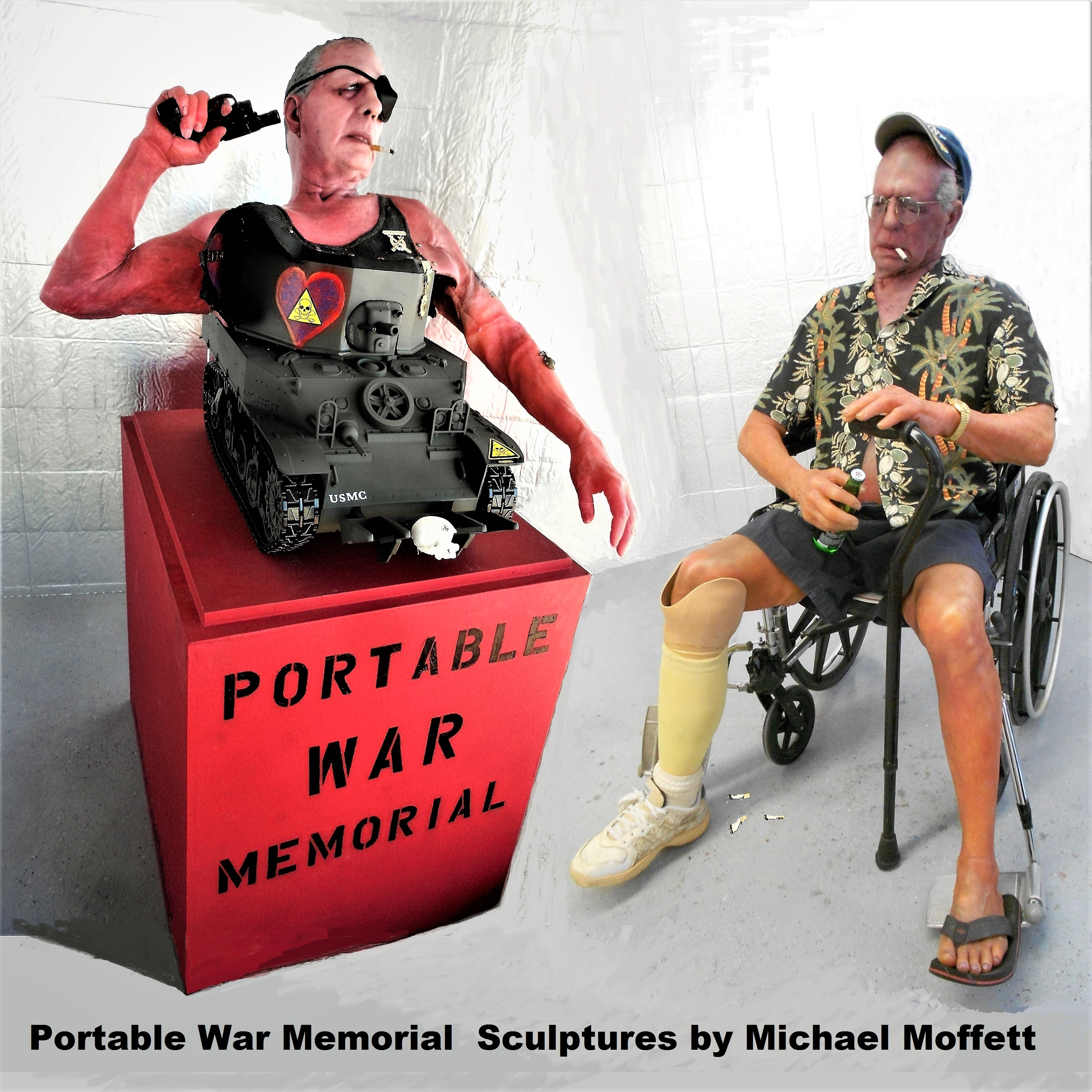
Portable War Memorial Sculpture

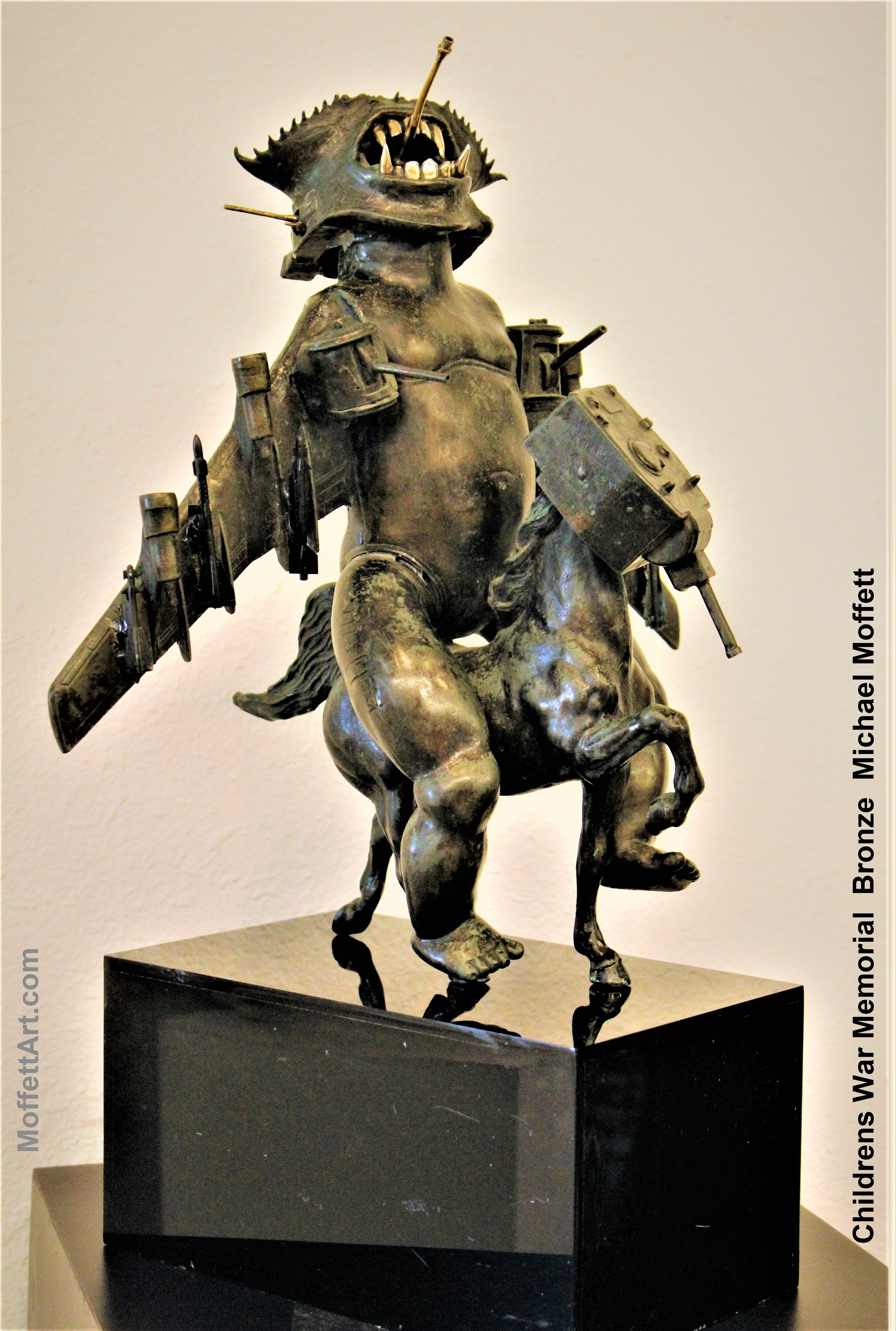
Childrens War Memorial, bronze

Michael Moffett is an American shock artist. and realistic sculptor raised in New York City and Sarasota, Florida. He has spent much of his career in Cocoa Beach, Florida. He is known for his two-part, life-sized, hyper-realistic sculpture of a homeless veteran in a wheelchair looking at a second sculpture of a man's torso mounted on a tiny military tank with a gun to his head titled the Portable War Memorial. The piece deals with PTSD and veteran suicide. Many of his bronze sculptures merge human figures and industrial machines. His body casts of numerous human models are made with various materials, including resin and silicone.

== Education ==
In 1969, Moffett served as a Marine corp radio operator along the Ho Chi Minh Trail, in Vietnam. Those combat experiences tinged much of his work. Later he attended Ringling School of Art and Design in Sarasota and Palomar College in California, majoring in Fine Arts before working as a professional welder in his own studio for several years.

== Career and Style ==
Around 1979, Moffett started casting in polyester resins, epoxies, and silicone rubber. His hyper-realistic sculpture could be compared to Duane Hanson and John De Andrea. Many of his paintings feature strong social commentary, including satirical advertising slogans.

He also formerly taught sculpture at the Maitland Art Center, Maitland, Florida, from 2018 to 2022

== Controversy ==
After being commissioned to create a bronze drinking fountain for the City of Cocoa, Florida, and the local art community, Moffett created the sculpture titled Fountainhead. The drinking fountain included giant, mismatched feet, dangling hands and breasts, with a water spout spewing from its vampire-fang, tipped lips. Upon its unveiling, the mayor of Cocoa quickly decommissioned and banned the piece from the city. It is currently on tour.

== Exhibitions & Awards ==
Clio Art Fair in Manhattan, NY (2019)

A Soldier's Home Show at Art & History Museums - Maitland Art Center, Maitland, FL (2018)

Orange, Fresh Squeezed Florida Artist in the Big Apple, The Bishop Gallery, Brooklyn, NY (2017)

Best in Show, Fountainhead, Orlando Museum of Art (2013)

Best in Sculpture at Disney Festival of Masters, the Altar (1979)

Best in Show, No. 1, The Sarasota Art Association, now Art Center Sarasota, (1970)
