= Jia-Jen Lin =

Taiwanese-American visual artist

- Born: Taichung, Taiwan
- Education: School of the Museum of Fine Arts at Tufts University, Boston, MA; National Taiwan Normal University, Taipei, Taiwan
- Website: http://jiajenlin.info/

Jia-Jen Lin (Chinese: 林嘉貞; pinyin: Lín Jiājen) is a Taiwanese-American visual artist based in New York City and Taichung. Her work spans several media, including sculpture, video, photography, and collaborative performance. Lin uses her artwork as a way to investigate the human body in its role as an experiential interface for the mind and experience.

She was a resident at Sculpture Space in Utica, New York in 2014.

== See also ==
- Taiwanese art
