= Chris Roberts (pilot) =

British test pilot

Christopher Roberts (born 1945) is a former British test pilot.

== Career ==
=== Royal Air Force ===
He trained at RAF South Cerney in Gloucestershire, and RAF Syerston in Nottinghamshire and completed it at RAF Valley in Anglesey North Wales. He flew with the Royal Air Force, beginning with 20 Squadron on the Hawker Hunter at RAF Tengah in Singapore from 1966 to 1969. He then returned to RAF Valley as a flying instructor on the Hawker Hunter.

He became a member of the Red Arrows, as Red 2, from 1971 to 1972. He had flown the Harrier with the RAF, starting with the Harrier Operational Conversion Unit, at RAF Chivenor, from early 1973. He attended the Empire Test Pilots' School and flew with the Aeroplane and Armament Experimental Establishment Boscombe Down in Wiltshire.

=== British Aerospace ===
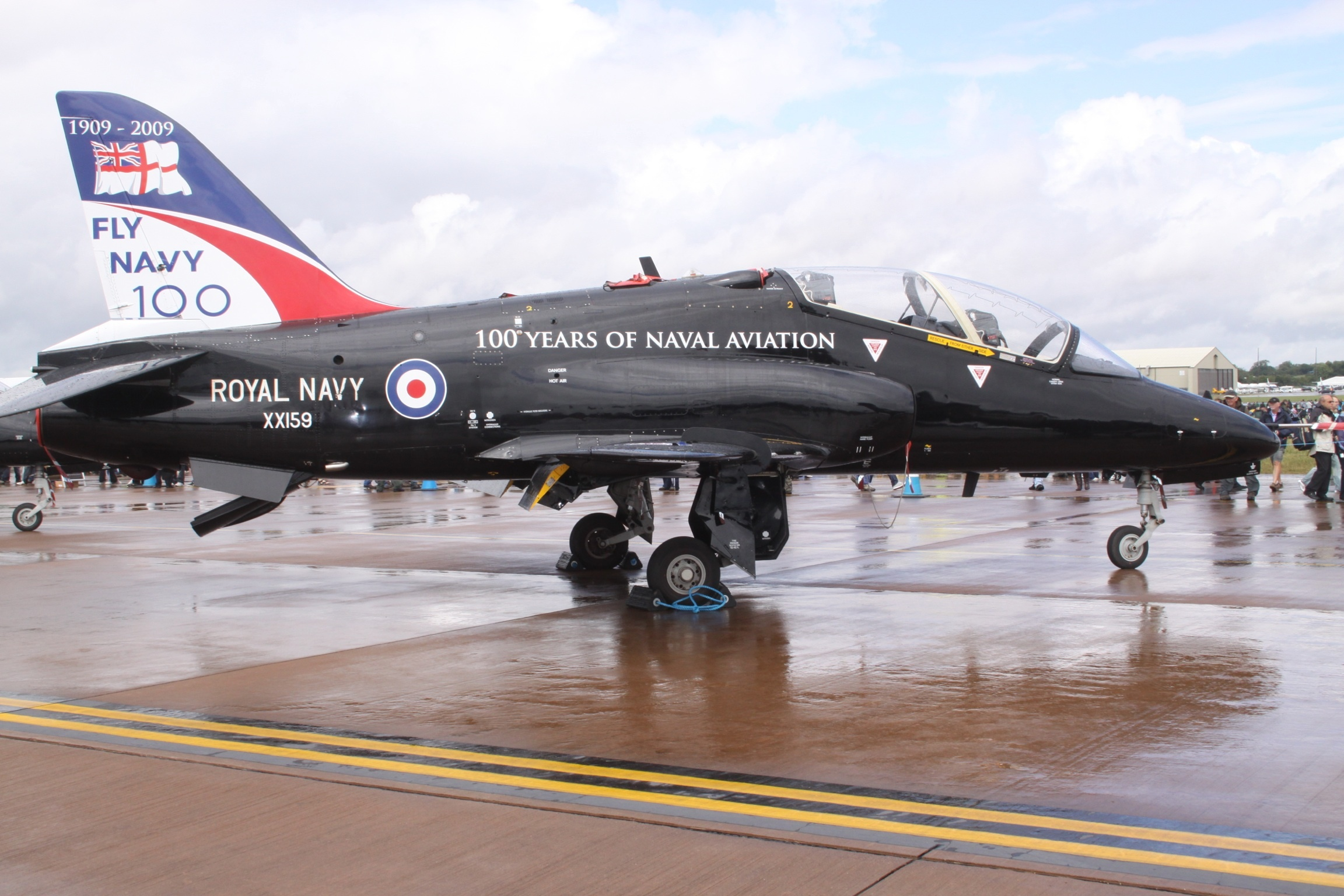
Hawk XX159, one of the early British Aerospace Hawks that he flew, seen at RIAT at RAF Fairford in July 2009

He joined British Aerospace as a test pilot in 1979, becoming deputy chief test pilot in 1987. On 24 April 1987 he flew the second prototype ZH200 of the Hawk 200, the single-seat version, being the project test pilot; the aircraft would make its public debut at the 1987 Paris Air Show in June 1987. He flew Hawk XX159 with Mike Snelling.

He became Chief Test Pilot for the Harrier in February 1990.

Most of his flight testing, as chief test pilot, was with the Harrier GR7. In 1991 he became a Fellow of the Royal Aeronautical Society.

=== Airline pilot ===
He became an airline pilot with Airtours, flying the MD83 at Gatwick Airport. He left Airtours in May 2003.

After flying, he is now on the UK Airprox Board, and has been on the Air Safety Group of the Parliamentary Advisory Council for Transport Safety.

Business positions
Preceded by	Chief Test Pilot of British Aerospace; February 1990 -	Succeeded by
