= Sculpture Space (Utica) =

Studio in upstate New York, US

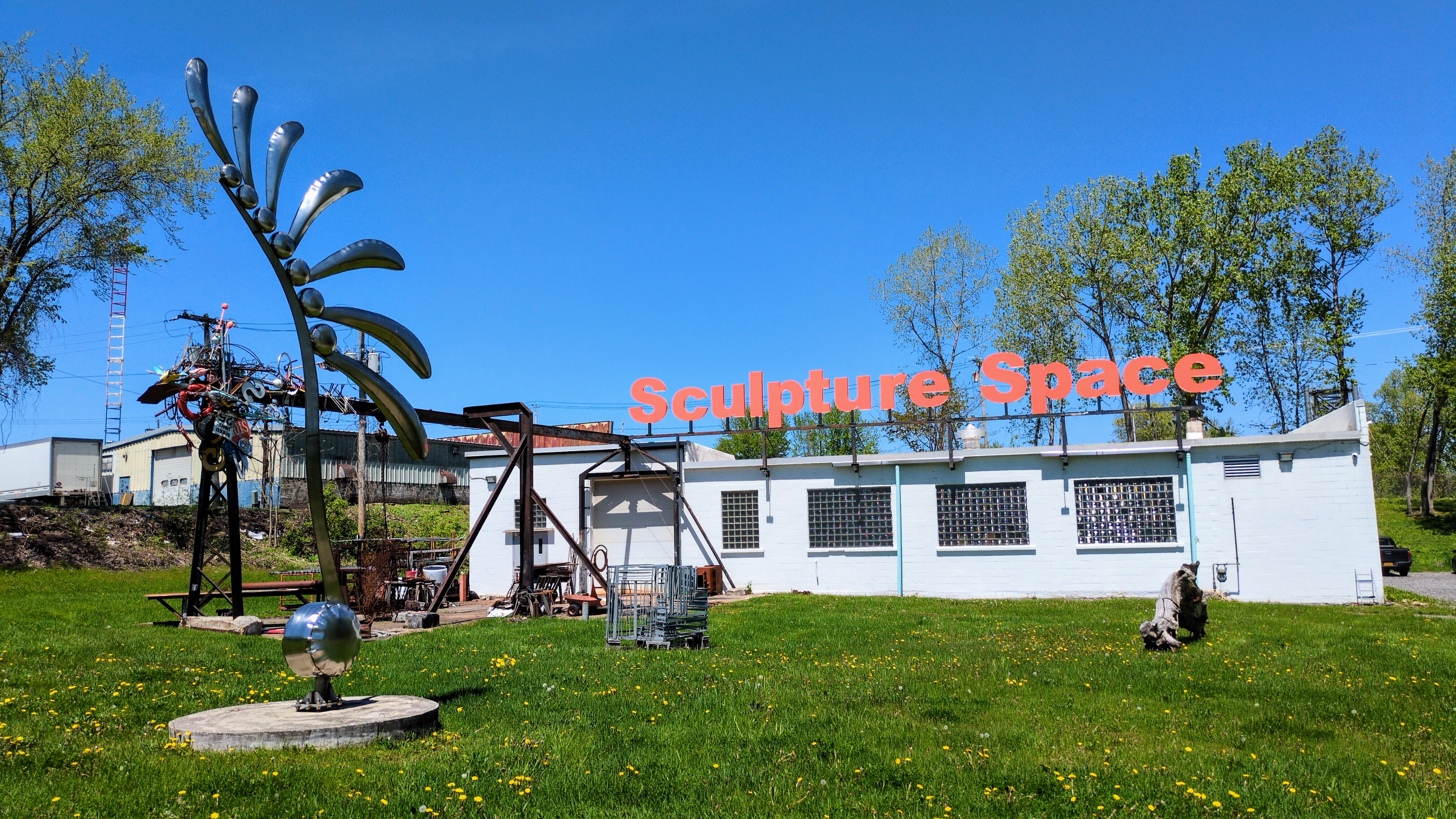
- Established: 1976
- Location: 12 Gates St, Utica, New York, US
- Coordinates: 43°6′24″N 75°14′37″W
- Website: www.sculpturespace.org

Sculpture Space is an art studio and sculpture park in Utica, New York, United States. Founded in 1976, it holds a residency program for about 20 sculptors each year, giving them access to an industrial space where large-scale works can be built. It is unusual among arts residency programs in its focus on sculpture, as well as its location in an urban area rather than a rural artists retreat.

== History ==
In the wake of New York City's 1975 fiscal crisis, some funding for the arts began to be diverted into the rest of the state. In 1975, an arts instructor at a local college sought a place to complete a large metal sculpture. One of his students suggested he could rent space from his father, who owned the Utica Steam Engine and Boiler Works. Other sculptors heard of the arrangement and asked to take part, resulting in the Boiler Works renting a building to the artists. In the first year, six sculptors had studios in the newly named Sculpture Space. In 1978, Sculpture Space incorporated as a non-profit. In 1981, it had a budget of $20,000, with contributions from the National Endowment for the Arts, New York State Council on the Arts, and private donors. Initially artists came and went as they needed, without a structured residency program, up to five at a time. Sculptors benefited from readily available metalworking tools and lower material costs than in New York City, as well as chance to leave the distractions of the SoHo arts scene. One artist estimated that a sculpture made at Sculpture Space for $300 would have cost $1,000 in NYC. Artists were initially allowed to use metalworking equipment themselves, but later, due to insurance concerns, directed Boiler Works employees instead. Eventually the building and equipment were sold to Sculpture Space, letting sculptors once more use the tools themselves.

Sculpture installations have been made in spaces the building, on the grounds outside, and around the city of Utica. In 1998, Sculpture Space purchased an adjacent abandoned house. It was intended to be used as additional studio and office space, and would eventually become artist housing, but first was host to a steel and wood installation penetrating the exterior walls of the building, as if "an alien form that had fallen into the house." Out of concern for the neighbors, the artist also planted cosmos in the front yard. In 2001, to commemorate Sculpture Space's 25th anniversary, it invited five former residents to return to Utica. Their installations were set up outside City Hall, inside Union Station, and elsewhere throughout the city. A 2012 performance/installation incorporated a saxophone player that a sculptor had met at a local coffeehouse. Starting in 2008, Sculpture Space artists created the sculpture garden on the former Griffiss Air Force Base in nearby Rome, New York.

A Sculpture Space residency includes a stipend, travel allowance, and housing. From 2007 to 2010, the stipend was $2,000. In 2024 the stipend was $500. Typically four artists are resident at a time. Residencies after the first are unfunded. Sculpture Space is a founding member of the Alliance of Artists Communities.

In 2022, Sculpture Space was burglarized and heavily vandalized by a group of five local children aged 8 to 11. Although community support and a crowdfunding campaign helped them recover quickly, office files and records were permanently lost.

== Notable artists ==
- Alan Berliner (1987)
- Carlo Bernardini (2002)
- Gianluca Bianchino (2023)
- David Bowen (2004/2005)
- Esperanza Cortes (2016)
- Priscila De Carvalho (2010/2011)
- Heather Dewey-Hagborg (2007/2008)
- Irena Jůzová (1998/1999)
- Jimmy Kuehnle (2009/2010)
- Juliana Cerqueira Leite (2011/2012)
- Jia-Jen Lin (2014)
- Anna Mlasowsky (2018)
- Frank Smullin (1980)
- Jina Valentine (2006/2007)
- Saya Woolfalk (2004/2005)
- Jayoung Yoon (2010/2011)
