= Paul Roberts (cricketer) =

English cricketer

Cricket information
- Batting: Right-handed
- Bowling: Right-arm medium

Career statistics
Competition	First-class	List A
Matches	1	1
Runs scored	0	0
Batting average	–	0.00
100s/50s	0/0	0/0
Top score	0*	0
Balls bowled	126	48
Wickets	1	2
Bowling average	40.00	16.00
5 wickets in innings	0	0
10 wickets in match	0	0
Best bowling	1/34	2/32
Catches/stumpings	0/–	0/–
- Source: Cricinfo, 7 November 2022

Christopher Paul Roberts was an English first-class cricketer who played one first-class and one List A game for Worcestershire in 1974. He died at the age of 25.

Roberts was born in Cleethorpes on 12 October 1951. He played for Worcestershire's second team many times between 1971 and 1973, as well as appearing twice for Lincolnshire in the Minor Counties Championship. In mid-August 1974, he produced a startling return of 8–13 for Worcestershire II against Lancashire II in a very low-scoring game where all 40 wickets fell in a single day. Worcestershire II won by 64 runs, using only two bowlers.

After this performance, Roberts was immediately called up to the first team for the John Player League game against Surrey. He took 2–32 (including the wicket of Geoff Howarth) from his eight overs in a match curtailed by the weather (Worcestershire were adjudged the winners on run rate), and was picked to play against Glamorgan in the County Championship at the end of August. He managed only a single wicket in his 21 overs, that of Arthur Francis, as Worcestershire won by ten wickets and took 17 points. Worcestershire finished the season as County Champions by a margin of only two points.

In 1975 Roberts played only minor cricket, mostly for the Worcestershire second team but also one of the warm-up matches for the World Cup, a 55-over game in which he took the wicket of Gundappa Viswanath. This match did not have List A status, despite the strong sides fielded by both teams.

Roberts subsequently worked as a teacher in Kidderminster.

On 9 June 1977, Roberts was killed by a 200 foot fall while climbing on Raven Crag, Borrowdale. A companion also died.
