= Governors Island Art Fair =

Governors Island Art Fair (GIAF) was an annual event on Governors Island in New York Harbor presented by 4heads and was New York City's first island-based art fair. In later years it partnered with both the National Park Service as well as the Trust for Governors Island. There were twelve visitors in the Fair's first year in 2008, when access to the island was limited, and attendance grew to more than 60,000 in 2016 when more than one hundred artists took over the island's historic spaces to present their art.

The fair was open to artists without gallery representation, and as a result of the non-traditional setting provided for greater gender balance than is typical at traditional art fairs.

In 2018, 4heads announced that the fair would rebrand as Portal:Governors Island or Portal GI as of its 2019 edition. Following the COVID-19 pandemic, 4heads pivoted their Governors Island work into an artists residency program.
