= Pensacola Museum of Art =

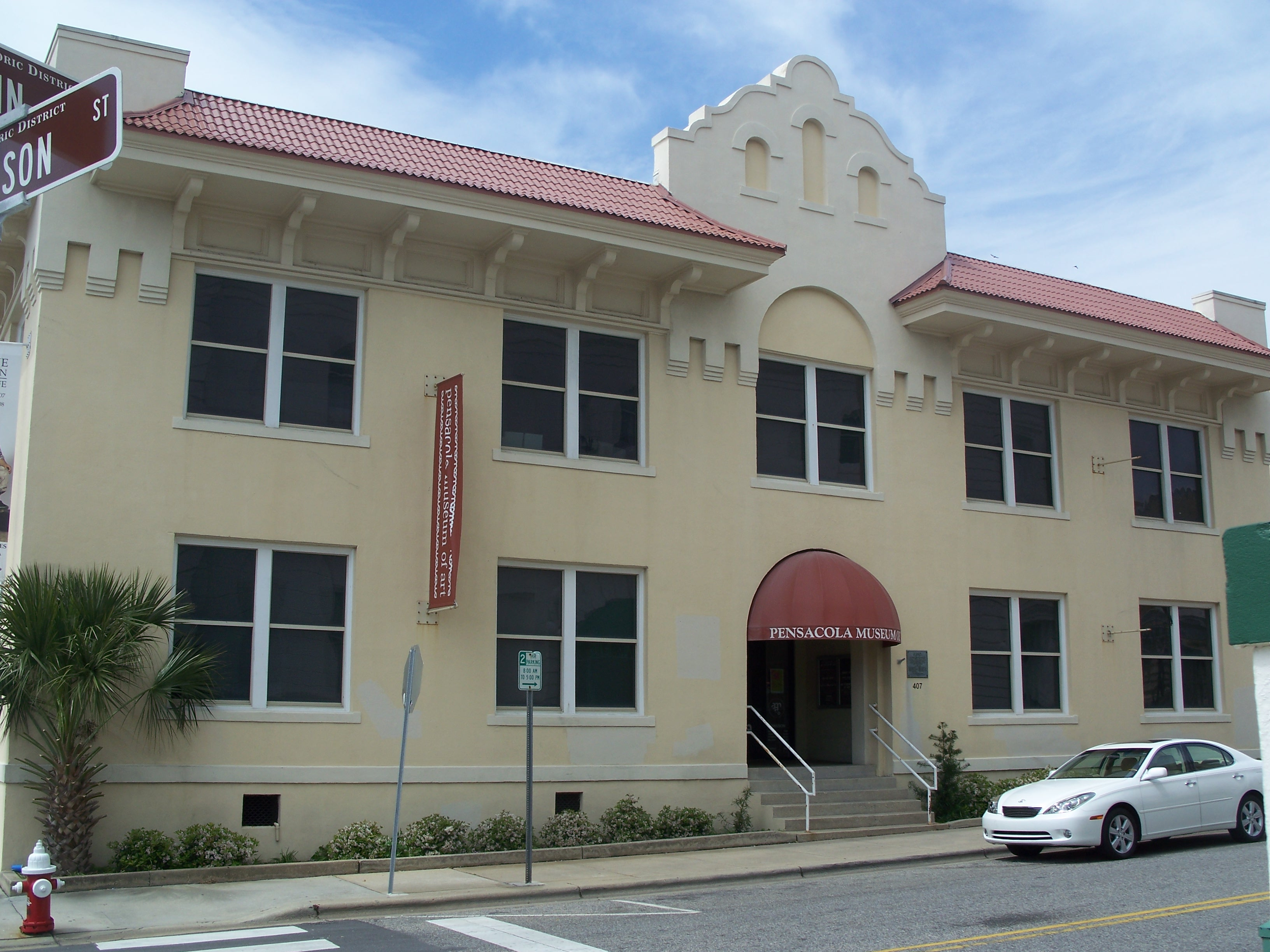

- Map of Florida
- Established: 1954
- Location: 407 South Jefferson Street Pensacola, Florida
- Coordinates: 30.40837°N 87.21335°W
- Type: Art museum
- Accreditation: American Alliance of Museums
- Website: pensacolamuseum.org

The Pensacola Museum of Art (PMA) is an art museum located in downtown Pensacola, Florida. PMA is accredited by the American Alliance of Museums. It was founded in 1954 by a group of women from the American Association of University Women. Since 2016, it is a University of West Florida Art Museum.

== History ==
In 1906, the City of Pensacola built a two-story building to hold its first permanent jail. In 1954, due to a growing population, the city decided to build a new structure and vacate the original jail. The Pensacola Art Association (PAA), formed by members of the American Association of University Women in 1954, leased the building from the city.

The structure itself was suitable for an arts center because the jail was already fireproof, secure and centrally located in Pensacola’s Historic Downtown District. The City allowed the group to lease the old jail for $1 per year. The PAA turned the jail cells into exhibition spaces. The PAA became the Pensacola Museum of Art in 1982 and in 1988 the Museum purchased the building.

In July 2016, the Pensacola Museum of Art transferred ownership to the University of West Florida.

Since 2001, the museum has been accredited by the American Alliance of Museums.

== Collection ==
Establishment of the Museum’s permanent collection began soon after incorporation in 1954.

The museum's permanent collection is centered on 20th century, modern and contemporary art, including painting, sculpture and works on paper. The PMA additionally has holdings of decorative arts of European and American glass and African tribal art in its collection.

The collection contains 20th and 21st century works by artists such as Alexander Calder, Andy Warhol, Pablo Picasso, Leonard Baskin, Salvador Dalí, Thomas Hart Benton, Louis Comfort Tiffany and Käthe Kollwitz. Other artists in the collection include John Marin, Miriam Schapiro, Fairfield Porter, Hunt Slonem, Alex Katz, Lynda Benglis, Milton Avery and Alexander Calder.
