= Herman D. Stein =

Herman D. Stein, DSW (August 13, 1917 – October 2, 2009) was Dean of the Mandel School of Applied Social Sciences and University Professor Emeritus at Case Western Reserve University in Cleveland, OH. A pioneer of social work profession, he excelled as an educator, scholar, internationalist, university administrator, and leader in a variety of professional associations in his long career, spanning more than sixty years. Stein served as Provost of Case Western Reserve University during the turbulent years of the 1960s and continued teaching as a full professor. He was asked to serve as Provost again in 1985. He was twice a Fellow at the Center for Advanced Study in the Behavioral Sciences at Stanford University.

== Career ==
After earning his doctorate at Columbia University, Stein taught at the Columbia University School of Social Work for fourteen years. He later was a professor at Smith College School for Social Work, Harvard School of Public Health, and the University of Hawaii. He lectured at several other universities in the United States and around the world, as well as helping to establish schools, such as The Paul Baerwald School of Social Work and Social Welfare in Israel,

In his career, Stein served as a Senior Advisor to the Executive Director of UNICEF for more than 20 years, where he helped shape and build the organization. He left a promising career at Columbia University to help Holocaust survivors in post WWII Europe under the auspices of the American Jewish Joint Distribution Committee (AJJDC). He was instrumental in expanding the operations of the American Jewish Joint Distribution Committee (AJJDC) beyond Europe and served in several capacities with the organization. His commitment to AJJDC lasted for more than 60 years until the day of his death.

Moving to Cleveland to become the dean of the Mandel School of Applied Social Sciences at Case Western University, Stein served during the turbulent years of the 1960s and continued teaching as a full professor.

Stein published extensively in social work literature. He was the author of several books and more than a hundred journal articles mainly in the fields of social work practice, social administration, international social work, and social work education. In professional organizations, Stein served as the President of the International Association of Schools of Social Work from 1968 to 1976 and the President of the Council on Social Work Education (CSWE) from 1968 to 1976.

== Honors and legacy ==
- Stein was awarded the University Medal, the highest honor of the Case Western Reserve University, for his leadership and expert judgment in guiding the University through the turbulent sixties.
