= National Legal Aid & Defender Association =

American nonprofit organization

- Abbreviation: NLADA
- Predecessor: National Alliance of Legal Aid Societies
- Formation: 1911; 115 years ago
- Type: Nonprofit
- Legal status: Active
- Headquarters: Washington, D.C., U.S.
- Services: Legal aid advocacy; public policy; legislative debates; resource provision
- Fields: Legal aid; public defense; civil rights
- Official language: English
- Key people: Arthur von Briesen (First President)
- Awards: Mary Ellen Hamilton Award, Clara Shortridge Foltz Award
- Website: www.nlada.org
- Formerly called: National Alliance of Legal Aid Societies (1911-1949)

The National Legal Aid & Defender Association (NLADA) is the oldest and largest national, nonprofit membership organization devoted to advocating equal justice for all Americans and was established in 1911.

== History ==
The Fourteenth Amendment to the United States Constitution and its Equal Protection Clause provides equal justice under law. Beginning in the late 1800s and throughout the early years of the 20th century, the American legal profession expressed its commitment to the concept of free legal assistance for poor people in the form of legal aid societies and bar association legal aid committees.

The first legal aid society, The German Society of New York, was founded in 1876 to protect German immigrants from exploitation. Subsequently, the agency's protection was extended to others and in 1890 it became the Legal Aid Society of New York. In 1888, the Ethical Culture Society of Chicago established by the Bureau of Justice was the first agency to offer legal assistance to individuals regardless of nationality, race or gender. Other municipalities followed suit, and in the first decades of the 20th century most major cities had opened legal aid societies.

In 1911, legal aid societies joined together to form the National Alliance of Legal Aid Societies. Arthur von Briesen of the Legal Aid Society of New York was the first president of the organization that became the National Legal Aid & Defender Association (NLADA) in 1949.

The concept of free legal assistance for the poor was promoted by the publication of Reginald Heber Smith's Justice and the Poor in 1919. Smith challenged the legal profession to consider it an obligation to see that access to justice was available to all, without regard to ability to pay. "Without equal access to the law," he wrote, "the system not only robs the poor of their only protection, but places in the hands of their oppressors the most powerful and ruthless weapon ever invented.

As a result of Smith's book, the American Bar Association created the Special Committee on Legal Aid Work. By the middle of the 20th century, virtually every major metropolitan area had some kind of legal aid program. However, the system established was not suffice in meeting the needs of the poor and in the early 1960s a new model for legal services programs emerged. This new model was based on the philosophy that legal services should be a component of an overall anti-poverty effort. The Ford Foundation was one of the original supporters of this model.

Subsequently, in 1964 came the passage of the Economic Opportunity Act, which launched the war on poverty and mandated federal funds to be allocated for the first time to fund legal services to the poor. However, this law did not specifically provide for legal services and it took many years and attempts to finally devise a federal construct to support legal aid for the low-income community. After years of research and advocacy, the Legal Services Corporation Act was enacted in 1974 by President Richard Nixon. This program flourished and has evolved over the years to become the organization nationally recognized as the Legal Services Corporation.

Over the years legal aid has evolved into a comprehensive program that provides legal assistance to low-income people regardless of race, ethnicity or gender. NLADA is the only national membership organization devoted exclusively to ensuring legal representation for individuals who cannot afford an attorney.

NLADA serves the equal justice community in two major ways: providing products and services and as a national voice in public policy and legislative debates on the many issues affecting the equal justice community. NLADA also serves as a resource for those seeking more information on equal justice in the United States.

In recent years, the NLADA has honored individuals and organizations with a variety of awards at its annual conferences. Awards range from the Mary Ellen Hamilton award, which recognizes a client of a legal aid or defender organization, to the Clara Shortridge Foltz Award, which honors organizations that have pioneered important innovations in the field. Notable recipients of NLADA awards include former Attorney General Janet Reno, Bronx Defenders attorney David Feige, Forensic social worker Cessie Alfonso, San Francisco lawyer Tanya Neiman, and Hillary Clinton.

== See also ==
- Legal aid in the United States
- Cessie Alfonso
- Martha J. Bergmark
