= Mandel School of Applied Social Sciences =

Jack, Joseph and Morton Mandel School of Applied Social Sciences
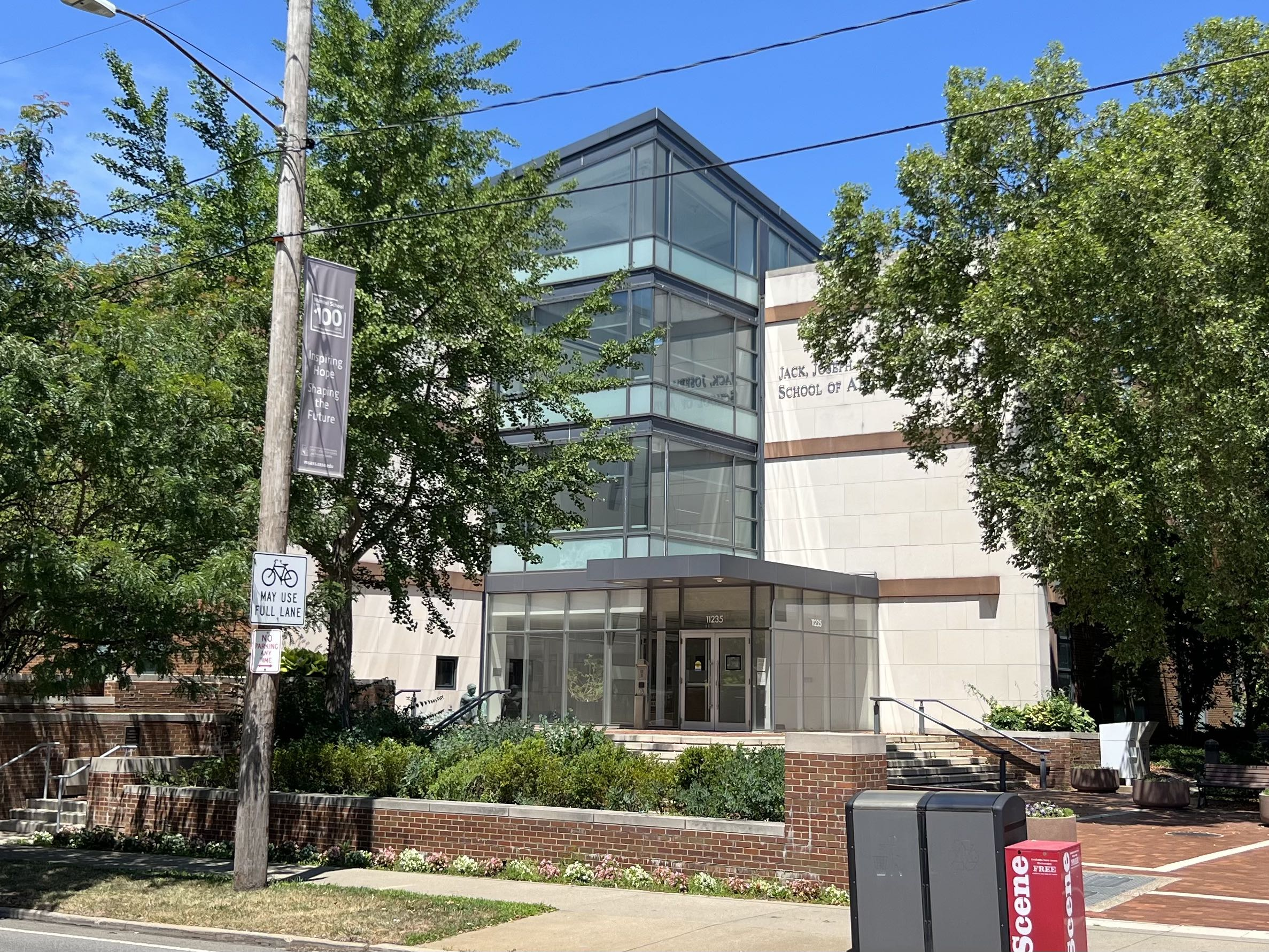
- Former names: Mandel School of Applied Social Sciences
- Type: Academic unit of Case Western Reserve University
- Established: 1915
- Parent institution: Case Western Reserve University
- Dean: Dexter R. Voisin
- Academic staff: 30
- Location: Cleveland, OH, USA; 41°30′38″N 81°36′26″W
- Campus: Urban
- Website: Mandel School

The Jack, Joseph and Morton Mandel School of Applied Social Sciences is a school of social work, one of the six professional schools within the Case Western Reserve University system, located in the University Circle in Cleveland, OH. Established in 1915, it is one of the first schools of social work in the United States to be affiliated with a university.

== Mission ==
The Mandel School of Applied Social Sciences provides and integrates professional social work education, research, and service to promote social justice and empowerment in communities through social work practice locally, nationally, and internationally.

== Research centers ==
The Center for Evidence-Based Practices (EBPs) is a technical-assistance organization that promotes knowledge development and the implementation of evidence-based practices for the treatment and recovery of people with severe mental illness and co-occurring severe mental and substance use disorders. The Center also implements and studies emerging best practices in an effort to identify innovations that consistently generate improved outcomes and, thus, may become an EBP.

The Center on Interventions for Children and Families (CICF) is a research and training center that is focused on developing and disseminating evidence based interdisciplinary treatment models that promote the developmental and social emotional well-being of young children by enhancing family and social-environmental supports. These include interventions designed to improve parenting/caregiving skills, promote the stability of families, and enhance the social and community supports of families.

The Center on Substance Abuse and Mental Illness provides education, research, training and consultation in the fields of substance abuse and mental health, with particular emphasis on the co-existence of substance and mental disorders.

The Center on Urban Poverty and Community Development] views the city as both a tool for building communities and producing change locally. The Center's approach to research places high value on being responsive to the research questions and issues that emerge from residents and the community. Consequently, the Center works closely with policy-makers and advocacy organizations and brings its research into the public-policy discussion. It works with organizations at all levels to raise community capacity, improve service delivery and analyze community needs and assets. The center is a member, along with 33 other members, of the National Neighborhood Indicators Partnership (NNIP), an initiative funded by the Urban Institute. In accordance with the democratization of knowledge, the Center maintains a publicly available, free, online database (NEO CANDO, available at http://neocando.case.edu) covering a 17-county region, to bring neighborhood information such as Census figures, crime statistics, property information and other demographic details to the people of Northeast Ohio.

The Begun Center is a comprehensive, multi-disciplinary collaboration focused on violence prevention research, development of community-based violence prevention programs, program evaluation, and violence prevention education in the form of conferences, workshops, lectures, and publications. The Begun Center offers services, such as training and technical assistance on strategic planning and management indicators, which improve community-based violence intervention and prevention initiatives.

The Ohio Supported Employment Coordinating Center of Excellence is a technical-assistance organization that helps service systems, organizations, and providers implement and sustain the Supported Employment (SE) model, maintain fidelity to the model, and develop collaborations within local communities that enhance quality of life for consumers of mental health services and their families. SE is an evidence-based practice (EBP) that enables people with severe mental illness to acquire competitive jobs in their local communities. Research demonstrates that SE significantly increases employment rates. The SE CCOE provides these services: service systems consultation; program consultation; clinical consultation; training and education; research and evaluation.

== Deans ==
- James E. Cutler (1915–1941)
- Leonard W. Mayo (1941–1948)
- Donald V. Wilson (1948–1950)
- Margaret Johnson (1950–1958)
- Nathan E. Cohen (1958–1964)
- Herman D. Stein (1964–1968)
- John B. Turner (1968–1973)
- Ruby Pernell (1973–1974 Interim)
- Merl C. Hokenstad (1974–1983)
- John Y. Yankey (1980–1981 Acting)
- Arthur Naparstek (1983–1988)
- Richard L. Edwards (1988–1992)
- Wallace J. Gingerich (1992–1994 Interim)
- Darlyne Bailey (1994–2002)
- Grover C. Gilmore (2002–2021)
- Sharon E. Milligan (July 1 – December 31, 2021 Interim)
- Dexter R. Voisin (January 1, 2022 – Present)

== See also ==
List of social work schools
