= ACSW =

ACSW may refer to:

- XM307 Advanced Crew Served Weapon
- The Alberta College of Social Workers, both the designated regulatory body for the profession of social work and the professional association representing the interests of social workers in Alberta, Canada
- Academy of Certified Social Workers, a credential issued by the National Association of Social Workers
