= Unfaithful Angels: How Social Work Has Abandoned Its Mission =

Social Work Book

Unfaithful Angels: How Social Work Has Abandoned Its Mission is a 1994 non-fiction book written by Harry Specht and Mark E. Courtney. The book was published by Free Press which later became an imprint of Simon & Schuster.

== Reception ==
In an review published in the Journal of Sociology & Social Welfare, Jeanne Marsh of the University of Chicago noted that that the book makes a significant contribution by alerting readers to important trends in social work practice and education. The Chronicle of Higher Education noted the book's central, controversial critique. The review mentioned that university social work programs were increasingly abandoning their foundational mission to aid the underprivileged, instead functioning as training grounds for private practice psychotherapy. A review in Social Work, published by Oxford University Press on behalf of the National Association of Social Workers covered how Specht and Courtney's work challenged the profession to critically re-evaluate its trajectory. The review also mentioned that the book questions whether the widespread adoption of individualistic, psychiatric-based models had compromised the field's historic commitment to the poor and disenfranchised. Linda Chernus wrote a critical review in the Clinical Social Work Journal. She titled her review "Social workers: Fallen angels or mere mortals?". Chernus agreed that many social workers were moving into private practice. However, she felt the authors glorified early 19th-century social workers too much. Most importantly, she rejected the book's main idea. She argued that doing one-on-one therapy does not betray the mission of social work. The government of Singapore cited the book in their official social work guidelines as a case study. The book was used to explain a constant tug-of-war in the profession, the choice between helping individuals and fixing the broader system.
