= Utilization rate =

Percentage of work charged to a client

In business, the utilization rate is an important number for firms that charge their time to clients and for those that need to maximize the productive time of their employees. It can reflect the billing efficiency or the overall productive use of an individual or a firm.

== Calculating ==
Looked at simply, there are two methods to calculate the utilization rate.

The first method calculates the number of billable hours divided by the number of hours recorded in a particular time period. For example, if 40 hours of time is recorded in a week but only 30 hours of that was billable, the utilization rate would then be 30 / 40 = 75%.

With this method, however, it's easy to see how this utilization rate can be gamed: if a business stops recording non-billable time, its utilization rate will always be 100%.

The second way to calculate the utilization rate is to take the number of billable hours and divide by a fixed number of hours per week. For example, if 32 hours of billable time are recorded in a fixed 40-hour week, the utilization rate would then be 32 / 40 = 80%.

Note that with this second method it is possible to have a utilization rate that exceeds 100%. If 50 hours of billable time are recorded in a fixed 40-hour week, then the utilization rate would be 50 / 40 = 125%.

Another consideration is the in-/exclusion of absent hours, e.g. leave or illness. Common practice is to exclude these from utilization calculations. Excluding absent hours can also help remove seasonality from utilization calculations.

== Behavior ==
Differences in how utilization is measured can also drive different behaviors, and some organizations may employ multiple utilization measures. For instance, an independent professional services or consulting firm may rely solely on billable utilization. An organization that sells products as well as implementation or support services may utilize the notion of "productive" utilization, which also measures and rewards time on activities like product development that are important, but which may not be billed directly to a client.
