= Disaster social work =

Disaster social work is the practice of social work during natural disasters. This field specializes in strengthening individuals and communities in the wake of a natural disaster. It includes working with the most vulnerable members of a community while strengthening the community as a whole in order to help with the recovery process.

For a disaster to be classified as natural, it must be caused by a force of nature and result in great damage or loss of life. Examples of natural disasters are floods, earthquakes, hurricanes, tsunami, avalanches, and tornadoes.

== Targets of Social Work ==
According to the American Red Cross, "Across the duration of a disaster, four stages have been identified that provide chronological targets for social work responses:

1. Pre-impact, beginning when a disaster poses no immediate threat but prompts mitigation and preparedness activities
2. Impact, or the period when the disaster event takes place
3. Post-impact, or the period immediately after the impact up to the beginning of recovery
4. Recovery, or the period in which disaster survivors are working toward restoration of their pre-disaster state."

These four stages are the main targets social workers want to address when dealing with a natural disaster. These targets aim to help with the recovery process.

== Practice ==
In the context of disasters, social work should be a process that includes helping the emotionally and physically wounded while strengthening local communities. It is important to focus on development issues in addition to the disaster. Community organizers should be supportive facilitators helping the community members return to their lives before the trauma. Along with psychological help, social workers aim to help the public regain structure to their homes. Rather than taking over the process, their objective is to help the community accomplish these goals on their own. The idea behind this is that community members should be the ones to restore their lives in order to heal psychologically and come to terms with the disaster that has occurred. Social workers must also have knowledge of the systems and institutions in the community in order to work within and against them as necessary.

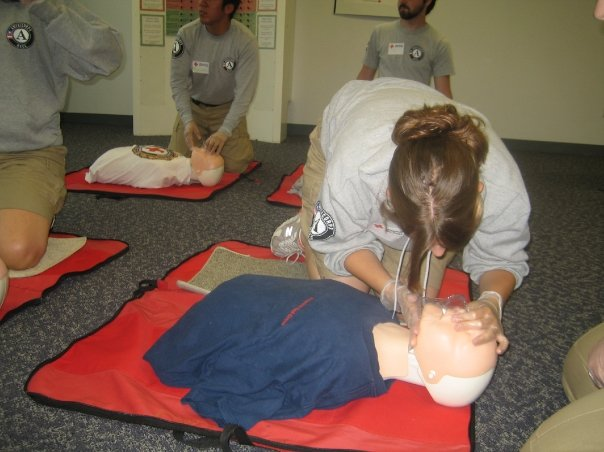
AmeriCorps NCCC members, including three social workers, learn CPR

In addition to these community organizing skills, social workers should also incorporate clinical and research skills. These skills should include the ability to assess emergent community needs, so that they can quickly assess the public health needs of individual community members immediately following a disaster, and make a plan accordingly. These kinds of assessments help social workers plan and organize their responses.

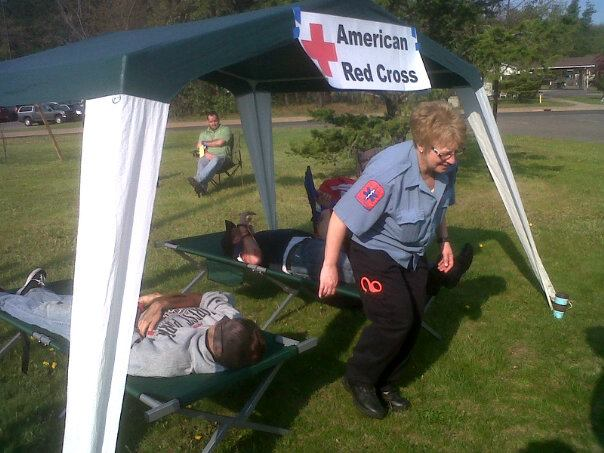
Volunteers attend a community emergency drill in Marquette, MI.

Social workers also need to formulate their approaches in a way that increases the self-determination of disaster survivors. Disaster survivors are in a vulnerable position, so it is important for social workers to ensure the survivors can maintain agency over their lives and not become disempowered by the expertise of the social worker.

Being prepared for disasters is yet another important role for social workers. They are there to help lessen the harmful effects of disasters. All communities should be prepared for natural disasters because nobody is immune to them. Social workers can help communities be prepared by emphasizing community collaboration and coordination of social networks to make a comprehensive plan before a disaster strikes.

== Ethical considerations ==
Across the board, the policies and national governmental bodies responsible for disaster management have been regarded as "unclear, poorly explained, too rigid, and required a high level of middle-class financial management skills to comply with eligibility requirements."

An emergency system in need of significant improvement risks the vital emergency needs in a community. Any areas in need of improvement result in delays in emergency services at the most critical time of need.

Even the best efforts and intentions of organizations may still pose ethical questions if the processes and services do not adequately translate into the desired outcome of adequately responding to survivors' needs under disaster conditions.

Ethically, social work professionals are held to the standards of the NASW Code of Ethics. This code outlines that a social worker has an ethical responsibility to serve the broader society: "Social workers should provide appropriate professional services in public emergencies to the greatest extent possible."

There is great difficulty working under emergency or disaster conditions, which highlights the need to continually work to expand and explore ways the system needs improving.

== Qualifications ==
Social workers are trained to provide services, navigate social systems, create necessary programs, and connect at-risk individuals with resources. They must work with all people regardless of their demographic characteristics and be committed to serving the most vulnerable members of communities. Social workers' skills in navigating complex systems of care for their clients makes the social work profession uniquely qualified to work with communities. Their skills are invaluable in ensuring the health of the community and individuals post natural disasters. Please refer to the links below for more information on how to become qualified to respond to disasters.

== See also ==
- American Red Cross
- Federal Emergency Management Agency (FEMA)
- National Association of Social Workers
- The Salvation Army
