= Education in social work =

Social workers employ education as a tool in client and community interactions. These educational exchanges are not always explicit, but are the foundation of how social workers acquire knowledge from their service participants and how they can contribute to information delivery and skill development.

== Psychoeducation ==
One of the ways in which social workers engage service participants with valuable information is through psychoeducation. Psychoeducation signifies a paradigm shift to a more holistic and competence-based approach, emphasizing health, collaboration, coping, and empowerment.

This method can be used within individual and community-wide interactions, concentrating on service participants' strengths. It constitutes a model that allows the social worker to provide the service participant with the information necessary to make an informed decision that will allow them to reach their respective goals.

== Education as a tool in community empowerment ==
Within the educational setting, social workers can disseminate valuable information through programs or initiatives aimed at providing educational resources and support to parents, helping them become more involved in their children's education and development. Boston Public Schools' Parent University (PU) focuses on Children Program serves as a facilitator for a PU for parents of children in the school district. PU focuses on child development, the content children are learning in school, parent and child advocacy, parental leadership, and effective parenting skills. The primary objective of the program is to equip parents with information that is beneficial for their children's academic success and their own personal and professional development. These classes are free to all parents with children in BPS and take place on Saturdays. A model such as this could be a forum for social workers, including school social workers, to work with parents regarding their child's academic needs.

Washtenaw Interfaith Coalition for Immigrant Rights (WICIR) is an organization co-founded by University of Michigan social work professor, Laura Sanders and numerous other community volunteers. WICIR has contributed to the immigrant rights campaign in Washtenaw County, Michigan. This organization developed a volunteer urgent response team in response to an immigration raid in 2008. It provides advocacy for families affected by increased immigration enforcement, Know Your Rights education to the immigrant community, ally education, and leads political actions toward local policy changes that affect immigrants and immigration reform. Recently, WICIR has provided training to empower immigrant community members to speak in public and to policymakers on behalf of policy reforms, advocate for the community, and help other immigrant families. Educational materials and workshops are provided in both English and Spanish.

== Alternatives ==
The NASW Code of Ethics emphasizes the importance of the social work professional being sensitive, aware, and culturally competent (1.05) while building partnerships with participants. The notion of cultural competency is being discussed; a new terminology suggests using cultural humility vs. cultural competency. These authors suggest that cultural humility is more sustainable and incorporates a lifelong commitment to self-evaluation and growth. The importance of bringing this to attention right away is to highlight that language use is extremely important when interacting with participants. Checking one's use of language as a professional has a powerful impact on our relationships. Furthermore, one's use of language can either perpetuate hierarchy or help to minimize it. If a social worker's goal is to empower participants, minimizing hierarchy is one way to develop more meaningful and equal relationships.

One way to limit hierarchy and cultural imperialism together is through community or people's education. This form of education differs from that of dominant education by including voices that are frequently left out. This is examined and explained in depth by the educator and philosopher Paulo Freire. In his most influential book Pedagogy of the Oppressed, Freire pioneered the critical pedagogy movement. Rather than using a traditional top-down approach while educating, Freire believed in a bottom-up approach. With this shift in power dynamics, educators including social workers will be more likely to realize the strengths of the people they are working with, rather than assuming that as professionals, they held all the answers. This philosophy became liked by social workers through its tenets of empowerment and self-esteem development.

Another example of this was Howard Zinn's A People's History of America. Zinn believed that the dominant narrative being taught in schools was excluding the voices and contributions of marginalized populations. On this website, educators can find critical resources that focus on the voices of oppressed and marginalized groups. This website contains hundreds of resources free of charge. Using tools such as this is beneficial for both the social worker and the participant.^{[source?]}

When facilitating or participating in education that challenges dominant narratives, it is important to be aware of one's own social identity. People's identities are complex and intersect with various aspects of ascribed status (that which is assigned to oneself) and achieved status (that which is "earned"). Reflecting and analyzing one's own identity and status can help foster a deeper understanding and respect for those around them. Being critical is a necessity when engaging in alternative narratives.

When facilitating or educating, it is important to set the mood of the group. This is usually done through an icebreaker before beginning the educational activity. It helps individuals warm up and get to know each other before discussing difficult issues, such as ones that challenge the dominant narrative. Many resources exist for icebreakers, but new ones can also be developed based on an education plan and the group to work with. After the discussion, it is important to have some sort of closure for the group. Discussing alternatives to a dominant narrative can be eye-opening, empowering, or uncomfortable for some. It is beneficial to discuss how individuals are feeling so that you can tailor future discussions to the needs of the group.

== Skills and tools for social workers that educate ==
Several organizations provide supplemental materials and guides for social work professionals that educate. Some of the most comprehensive resources are available from university social work departments and non-profit organizations. Some examples of this include the Council on Social Work Education and the State University of New York School of Social Work. The CSWE Gero-Ed Center lists a practice guide for social workers educating certain audiences that includes class exercises, assignments, case studies, and history.

=== Council on Social Work Education ===
The Council on Social Work Education (CSWE) is a non-profit association partnership of educational and professional institutions that works to ensure and enhance the quality of social work education and for a practice that promotes individual, family, and community well-being, and social and economic justice. The association provides various training for community education in a social work setting. For instance, the CSWE Gero-Ed Center lists a practice guide for social workers educating certain populations or audiences that includes class exercises, assignments, case studies, and competencies history.

The material provided explains the benefits of each activity style and what a group would gain from its implementation. Many of the activities resemble community education events. They are intended to provide insight into what educational styles may be most appropriate for the social worker's topic of interest or population. A policy analysis at a community agency meeting may call for an educational activity that divides the attendees into groups. This activity advocates for other community members or agencies. This type of activity, as described by the CSWE, allows for free discussion of intergenerational, multicultural, and political issues associated with that policy. This tool is among many others the CSWE provides for social workers that educate.

=== The State University of New York School of Social Work ===
For social workers who are newly introduced to education, the State University of New York School of Social Work provides resources that can help each educator find their style of teaching. SUNY explains that teaching is an art and that social workers, as educators, need to understand themselves and their students. Some of the identified tools provided by the School of Social Work include finding one's learning style, developing effective lesson plans, reflective teaching and professional development, resources by subject, and solution-focused teaching, among others.

Reflective teaching is an aspect of social work that explains the social worker's responsibility to create an environment for creative problem-solving. It allows room to consider more alternatives and develop a body of knowledge based on experiences. In the social work setting, this attempt at community education can prove to be most effective, as people's environments and populations are constantly changing. Reflecting and monitoring the educational process can help stabilize more creative and innovative ways to educate individuals, families, and communities. As social and economic justice issues become more prominent and delicate, social workers need to consider these tools for help seekers.
