= Clinical social work =

Form of social work

Clinical social work is a specialty within the broader profession of social work. The American Board of Clinical Social Work (ABCSW) defines clinical social work as "a healthcare profession based on theories and methods of prevention and treatment in providing mental-health/healthcare services, with special focus on behavioral and bio-psychosocial problems and disorders". The National Association of Social Workers defines clinical social work as "a specialty practice area of social work which focuses on the assessment, diagnosis, treatment, and prevention of mental illness, emotional, and other behavioral disturbances. Individual, group and family therapy are common treatment modalities". Clinical social work applies social work theory and knowledge drawn from human biology, the social sciences, and the behavioral sciences.

== History ==
The professionalization of clinical social work began with the social casework methods used by Charity Organization Society in England around 1877 to 1883. In 1898, the first social work class in the United States was offered at Columbia University by the New York Charity Organization Society. In 1904 Simmons College, in collaboration with Harvard University, established the Boston School for Social Workers. Also, in 1904, Columbia University offered the first graduate program in social work, although it was not named the New York School of Social Work until 1917.In 1917 Mary E. Richmond conceptualized social casework in her text Social Diagnosis.

The term social casework began to fade from use after 1920 and the term psychiatric social work became more in common as well as the application of psychoanalytic theory. Ehrenkranz reported that the first use of the term clinical social work was in 1940 at the Louisiana State University School of Social Work which offered a clinical curriculum. The National Federation of Societies for Clinical Social Work was established in 1971, which later became the Clinical Social Work Association in 2006. The Clinical Social Work Journal began in 1973 shortly after founding of the National Federation of Societies for Clinical Social Work. In 1978 the National Association of Social Workers' Task Force on Clinical Social Work Practice drafted the first working definition of clinical social work. The National Association of Social Workers established the Diplomate in Clinical Social Work (DCSW) in 1986. In 1987, the American Board of Examiners in Clinical Social Work was founded, which later became the American Board of Clinical Social Work in 2020, and established the Board Certified Diplomate in Clinical Social Work (BCD) credential. Today, clinical social work is licensed in all 50 of the United States, the District of Columbia, the U.S. Virgin Islands, all 10 Canadian Provinces, Guam and the U.S. Commonwealth of the Northern Mariana Islands, as well as licensed or certified by other jurisdictions around the world.

== Practice Methods ==
The core methods of clinical social work require "the application of social work theory, knowledge, methods, ethics, and the professional use of self to restore or enhance social, psychosocial, or biopsychosocial functioning of individuals, couples, families, groups, organizations and communities." The practice of clinical social work requires the application of specialized clinical knowledge and advanced clinical skills in the areas of assessment, diagnosis and treatment of mental, emotional, and behavioral disorders, conditions and addictions. Treatment methods include the provision of individual, marital, couple, family and group counseling and psychotherapy. Clinical social workers are qualified to diagnose using the Diagnostic and Statistical Manual of Mental Disorders (DSM), the International Classification of Diseases (ICD), and other diagnostic classification systems in assessment, diagnosis, psychotherapy, and other activities. The practice of clinical social work may include private practice and the provision of clinical supervision".

Assessment methods typically refers to a biopsychosocial assessment, clinical interview, direct behavioral observation, and/or the administering, scoring, and interpreting of various tests, inventories, questionnaires, and rating scales.

Further, clinical social workers engage in consultation, program and practice evaluation, and the administration of clinical programs and services.

=== Psychiatric Social Work ===
Psychiatric Social Work is a practice area of social work involving the care of individuals with Serious mental illness who require intensive care. They may be involved with referring, treating (with psychotherapy) or otherwise managing such patients. Most Psychiatric Social Workers work in psychiatric institutions or hospitals, though in some programs they may work outside the institution for a period of intense observation.

== Education ==
The Master of Social Work (M.S.W.) degree, accredited by the Council on Social Work Education, is the minimum education requirement in clinical social work and is the terminal practice degree. These M.S.W. degree are typically two full-time years of study in length and require 900 to 1,200 hours of internship practice. If an applicant to a M.S.W. degree program has a Bachelor of Social Work (B.S.W.) degree, accredited by the Council on Social Work Education, they may be offered "advanced standing" shorting their M.S.W. degree program to one years of full-time study.

The Doctor of Social Work (D.S.W.) is the advanced practice professional degree in social work. The D.S.W. may be specialized in an area or in multiple areas of social work practice, one of which may be clinical social work at some universities.

The Doctor of Philosophy (Ph.D.) in social work is typically considered a "research degree;" however, some schools may offer the Ph.D. degree in social work with a clinical social work practice specialization.

== Licensure ==
=== In the United States ===
Licensure is required to practice social work in the United States, and in many other jurisdictions. Clinical social work licensure typically requires 1,500 to 5,760 hours of post-master's clinical work experience under clinical supervision with a board approved clinical supervisor, and a passing score on an Association of Social Work Boards approved clinical level examination. The number of post-master's clinical hours may vary by jurisdiction.

Clinical licensure titles also may vary by jurisdiction. The Association of Social Work Boards recommends the use of Licensed Clinical Social Worker (LCSW) as the preferred title. However, some jurisdictions have used other titles including, but not limited to Licensed Independent Social Worker (LISW), Licensed Independent Clinical Social Worker (LICSW), Licensed Specialist Clinical Social Worker (LSCSW), and Licensed Certified Social Worker-Clinical (LCSW-C).

== Certification ==
Certification is a voluntary process that typically does not authorize practice, but may suggest specialization in a subfield of practice. There are several certifications in clinical social work.

=== In the United States ===
The American Board of Clinical Social Work (ABCSW) offers the Board Certified Diplomate in Clinical Social Work (BCD), and several clinical social work specialization credentials including practice with children and their families, clinical supervision, and in psychoanalysis. The ABCSW states that the BCD is "the profession's premier" advanced clinical social work certification, having the highest standards of clinical education, training, and experience. The ABCSW offers three specialty certifications including Practice with Children and Their Families, Clinical Supervision, and Psychoanalysis. Each of these specialty certifications require the applicant to hold advanced clinical certification as a BCD in Clinical Social Work, have acceptable peer evaluations, to have accumulated a specified number of clinical practice hours, have the specified number of clock hours of clinical continuing education related to the specialty, and have had a specified number of supervision or consultation hours.

The National Association of Social Workers also offers several clinical social work credentials including the Qualified Clinical Social Worker (QCSW), Diplomate in Clinical Social Work (DCSW), Clinical Social Worker in Gerontology (CSW-G), and the Certified Clinical Alcohol, Tobacco & Other Drugs Social Worker (C-CATODSW). The Qualified Clinical Social Worker (QCSW) is the beginning level generalist clinical social work credential offered by NASW; NASW membership is not required to obtain the QCSW. The Diplomate in Clinical Social Work (DCSW) is the advanced level generalist clinical social work credential offered by NASW; NASW membership is required to obtain the DCSW. The Clinical Social Worker in Gerontology (CSW-G) is a specialty credential offered by NASW to clinical social workers who specialize in working in the area of gerontology; NASW membership is not required to obtain the CSW-G. The Certified Clinical Alcohol, Tobacco & Other Drugs Social Worker (C-CATODSW) is a specialty credential for clinical social workers who work in the area of alcohol, tobacco, and other drugs; NASW membership is not required to obtain the CSW-G.

The National Association of Forensic Counselors offers the Clinically Certified Forensic Social Worker (CCFSW) credential. The NAFC suggests that the CCFSW is a clinical level certification for clinical social workers who hold an M.S.W. or D.S.W. degree, have obtained clinical licensure in their state, have earned a specified amount of related continuing education, obtained a passing exam score, and work with adult and/or juvenile criminal offenders.

== See also ==
- Behaviour therapy
- Child psychotherapy
- Cognitive therapy
- Cognitive-behavioral therapy
- Counseling
- Couples therapy
- Crisis intervention
- Differential diagnosis
- Family therapy
- Forensic social work
- Grief counseling
- Group psychotherapy
- Interpersonal psychotherapy
- Mental health professional
- Psychiatric rehabilitation
- Psychoanalysis
- Psychodynamic psychotherapy
- Psychoeducation
- Psychotherapy
- School social worker
- Caseworker (social work)
- Solution-focused brief therapy
- Qualifications for professional social work
