= Martha Bergmark =

American attorney and civil rights advocate

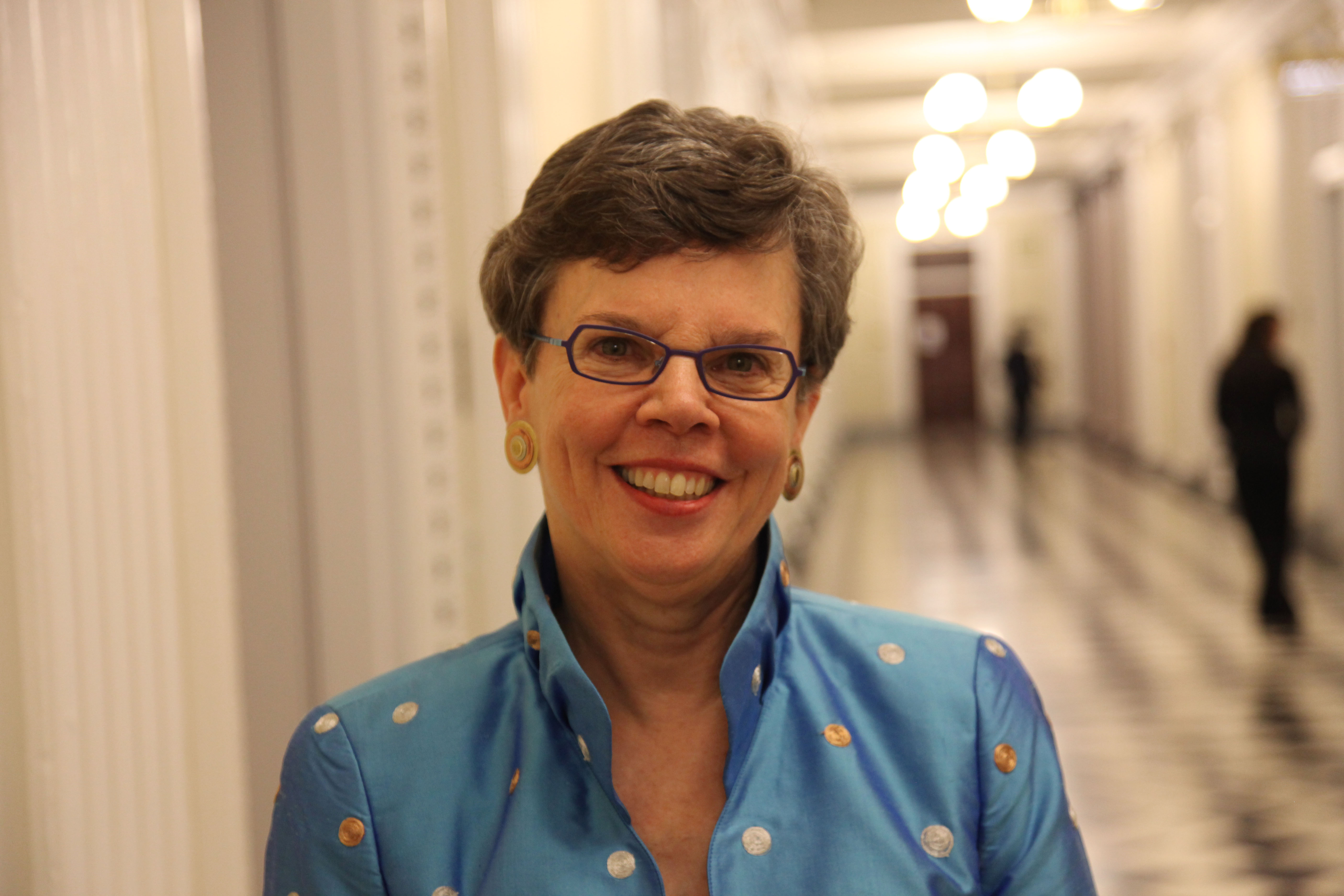
Bergmark receiving 2011 Obama White House Champions of Change award

Martha Jane Bergmark is an attorney, civil rights advocate, and writer from Mississippi. Bergmark is best known for her work promoting civil justice through civil legal aid organizations at the local, state, and national level. Currently, Bergmark serves as the executive director of Voices for Civil Justice. In 1978, she co-founded the Southeast Mississippi Legal Services to provide federally funded legal aid services in a nine county area.

In the late 1980s, she served as the civil division director and then as senior vice president for programs of the Washington, DC–based National Legal Aid and Defender Association. She held the position of president of the Legal Services Corporation which advocates for and administers federal funding for legal aid programs throughout the United States. In 2003, she moved back to Mississippi and co-found the Mississippi Center for Justice. Bergmark was recognized as a "Champion of Change" by United States President Obama's White House in 2011 for her work to advance racial and economic justice.

== Early life, education, and family ==
Martha Jane Bergmark is the daughter of Robert Bergmark, a Methodist minister, and Carol (Comstock) Bergmark, a choir director. In 1953, her family moved to Jackson, Mississippi, for her father to become a professor of philosophy at Millsaps College. Bergmark grew up in a traditional middle class community in Jackson where racial segregation between blacks and white residents was common and enforced through Jim Crow era laws. By the time she was in high school, her parents and she were involved at the local level with the civil rights movement and new federal social service programs to help promote economic advances for African Americans. During the summers, she traveled to Tougaloo, Mississippi, to work with under privileged African American children—the first summer as an unpaid volunteer aide for the Head Start Program, and the next two summers as a paid teacher's aide in the initial years of the Upward Bound program. The high school that she attended, Murrah High School, was racially integrated while she was student. Bergmark's decision to volunteer as an orientation counselor for incoming black students revealed for the first time to her friends and teachers her affinity to African Americans. Her experience during her high school years motivated her towards her career of working to advance racial and economic justice. Bergmark excelled academically in high school and was named a U.S. Presidential Scholar in 1966 for the State of Mississippi.

Bergmark earned a degree from Oberlin College. She obtained a Juris Doctor degree from University of Michigan Law School in 1973. While in law school Bergmark participated in the first law school clinic at the University of Michigan. As a law student, Bergmark worked as a Reginald Heber Smith Fellow at North Mississippi Rural Legal Services, Mississippi's first civil legal aid organization, and the Community Legal Services.

Bergmark met Elliott Andalman, her future husband, while in law school. They have two sons, Aaron Samuel Andalman and David Andalman. Her son, David Andalman, wrote and co-directed American Milkshake, which was selected for the Sundance Film Festival in 2013. The low budget independent comedy about race, class and basketball in 1990s was produced out of Bergmark's family house on Montgomery Avenue in Takoma Park, Maryland.

== Career ==
=== Early years in Mississippi ===
In 1973, after Bergmark graduated from law school, she returned to Michigan to established a civil rights and poverty law practice. With her husband and two other graduates from the University of Michigan Law School, Michael Adelman and Allison Steiner, Bergmark established a "legal collective" in Hattiesburg, Mississippi, that offered both civil and criminal legal service. In 1978, when federal funds were enlarged by United States President Jimmy Carter's administration, she left the law practice to found the Southeast Mississippi Legal Services in a nine county area. Bergmark was the organizations founding executive director.

=== Early years in Washington, DC ===
In 1987, Bergmark relocated to Washington, DC, where she was civil division director and then as senior vice president for programs of the National Legal Aid and Defender Association. Bergmark was the director of Project for the Future of Equal Justice. Later, she was the executive vice president and president of the Legal Services Corporation which advocates for and administers federal funding for legal aid programs throughout the United States.

=== Mississippi Center for Justice ===
In 2003, Bergmark moved back to Mississippi and co-found the Mississippi Center for Justice with funding granted as a Stern Family Fund's Public Interest Pioneer. She was the founding president/CEO of the Center until 2013.

=== Voices for Civil Justice ===
In 2013, the US Public Welfare Foundation established Voices for Civil Justice to better communicate to the public the positive role that civil legal plays in improving the social, economic, and health status of impoverished and marginalized people. Bergmark was the founding executive director of Voices for Civil Justice before her retirement in August 2021.

== Honors ==
Bergmark is a former Reginald Heber Smith Fellow and the 1990 recipient of the Kutak-Dodds Prize for her civil rights and legal aid work. She was the 2010 recipient of the American Bar Association Section of Litigation's John Minor Wisdom Public Service and Professionalism Award. Bergmark was recognized as a "Champion of Change" by United States President Obama's White House in 2011 for her work to advance racial and economic justice. Bergmark was awarded an honorary doctorate of public service from Millsaps College and an honorary doctorate from Oberlin College in 2012. Bergmark is a 2018 Presidential Scholars Roosevelt “Rosey” Thompson awardee.
