= Financial social work =

Financial social work is an interactive and introspective, multidisciplinary approach that helps individuals explore and address their unconscious feelings, thoughts and attitudes about money. This self-examination process enables people to improve their relationship with their money and thus establish healthier money habits that lead to improved financial circumstances.

Financial social workers typically work with mid to lower-income populations to help them find community resources to improve their financial health.

== History ==
Financial social work can be traced back to the work of home economists and social workers who supported families in the home, particularly low-income families, to provide a foundation in financial literacy including establishing a family budget. Although home economists and social workers have separate origins, their work focuses on the family and improving conditions.

The cooperative extension program run by home economists offered extension agents the opportunity to reach rural areas in working with families to manage home finances beginning with the Smith-Lever Act of 1914. Extension agents, known as home demonstration agents in the early 20th century, worked with families to promote smart consumerism and efficiency. Social workers emphasized “thrift” in the home by working with families to analyze purchases and evaluate how their money and other resources are being utilized in the home to break out of poverty.

Community educational initiatives and public social services expanded during the Great Depression to reach low-income families and families needing support such as the American Public Welfare Association. The APWA was designed to work with individuals and families who had undergone hardship and provide consulting services.

Through the work of social workers, home economists, and community and educational organizations, individuals and families are gaining financial well-being and financial capability, the concepts behind financial social work. Having autonomy over one's finances in meeting financial goals and managing one's money through financial practices leads to betterment in life.

== Disconnect from money ==
Consumerism features an increasingly cashless society with payment options including checks, credit cards, debit cards, money orders, small dollar loans and store-value cards, as well as various direct deposit methods for income and benefits. When individuals have less direct and physical contact with their money, they disconnect from it. This prevents them from knowing or understanding how much money they have, or how their spending impacts their financial circumstances.

== Determinants of financial behavior ==
Individuals' financial behavior is influenced by many internal and external factors. Internal elements include individual psychology, family history and environment Parents' values and beliefs on the importance of saving vs. spending and overall materialism impact their children's money values and beliefs; they transmit these money lessons primarily through modeling and discussion. External factors include media, markets, peers, culture, and social mood. In addition, self-worth, net worth and social signaling play a role on individuals' purchasing habits.

People with limited funds, or those trying to keep up with another's lifestyle often suffer from low self-esteem. This results in feeling unworthy of a better financial future and behaving in self-sabotaging ways such as overspending on high-status items.

Improved financial circumstances require increased self-awareness because every financial decision is impacted by an individual's thoughts, feelings and attitudes about money which are often more unconscious than conscious. The Financial Social Work model incorporates the transformative learning approach to expand self-awareness, sense of self and provide financial knowledge. As individuals gain more insight into why and how their thoughts and attitudes about money developed, they are more likely to make deep, long-lasting financial choices that positively impact their future.

They then pursue their individual path to financial wellbeing according to where they are in the life cycle and their readiness/willingness to change, as per the Transtheoretical Model of Behavior Change (TTM). In addition, ongoing education, motivation and support are provided as part of the Financial Social Work package, thereby maximizing the likelihood of the optimal results.

== Professional development ==
Historically, the majority of undergraduate and graduate social work programs have not included financial literacy or courses in personal finances. That is changing due to nearly two-thirds (65%) of 130 university program survey participants being very interested in developing or expanding student competency in financial capability, and with the University of Maryland's Financial Social Work Initiative, the Center for Financial Social Work's self-study certification process (recognized by the National Association of Social Workers (NASW)), and the 2016 launch of the Council on Social Work Education (CSWE) of the Clearinghouse for Economic Well-Being in Social Work Education to support these efforts.

== See also ==
- Financial deepening
- Financial inclusion
- Financial intelligence
- Financial literacy § Critical financial literacy
