= CASW =

CASW may refer to:

- Canadian Association of Social Workers
- Contemporary Art Society for Wales
