= Reginald Heber Smith =

American lawyer

- Born: December 21, 1889; Fall River, Massachusetts, U.S.
- Died: October 23, 1966 (aged 76); Boston, Massachusetts, U.S.
- Education: Harvard Law School
- Occupation: lawyer
- Years active: 1919-1966
- Notable work: Justice and the Poor
- Awards: American Bar Association Medal

Reginald Heber Smith (21 December 1889-23 October 1966), also known as Reg Smith, was an American lawyer. His book Justice and the Poor inspired the creation of legal aid programmes throughout the United States. He was awarded the American Bar Association Medal in 1951.

== Early life and education ==
Smith was born in Fall River to Emelius W. Smith and Emma Louisa Crocker. He obtained his Bachelor of Arts from Harvard University in 1910 and his Bachelor of Laws from Harvard Law School in 1914.

== Career ==
Smith was admitted to the Massachusetts Bar in 1914 and became Chief Council of the Boston Legal Aid Society. In 1919 he became managing partner at Hale and Dorr in Boston where he remained until 1956.

His book Justice and the Poor was published in 1919. It argued that the lack of equal justice undermined the social fabric and offered an agenda for action to provide legal aid. It is considered one of the most important books about the legal profession. The book was seminal for the provision of legal aid in the United States.

Smith is also credited as the inventor of the billable hour and other administrative innovations in the legal profession.

Smith was member of the Committee on Legal Aid Work from 1921 to 1936. In 1927, he and Edmund Ruffin Beckwith founded the Conference on Consumer Finance Law. Smith served on the Board of Editors of the American Bar Association Journal from 1941 to 1954. He was member of the Board of Directors of the American Bar Association Endowment from 1942 to 1955. Smith was Director of the Survey of the Legal Profession and Fellow of the American Bar Foundation.

== Personal life ==
In 1914, Smith married Margaret Currier (1890-1980). They had two children, Reginald Herber Smith Jr. (1916-2013) and Francis Currier Smith (1917-2012).

== Publications ==
- Justice and the Poor, A study of the present denial of justice to the poor and of the agencies, making more equal their position before the law (1919), Charles Scribner`s Sons, New York
- Growth of Legal Aid Work in the United States (1925), U.S. Government Printing Office
- Law Office Organization (1940), American Bar Association Journal, vol. 26 nos 5, 6, 7 and 8

== Awards ==
- American Bar Association Medal (1951)

== Legacy ==
=== Reginald Heber Smith Medal ===
The National Legal Aid & Defender Association established in 1957 the Reginald Heber Smith Medal, awarded annually for outstanding services to legal aid. Recipients of th medal include:

- Lou Frost (1975)
- Charles Henry Dorsey Jr. * Lou Frost (1975) (1982)
- Charles Gessler (2003)
- Jeff Adachi (2012)

=== Reginald Heber Smith Fellowships ===
The Office of Legal Services through its Office of Economic Opportunities, established in 1967 the Reginald Heber Smith Fellowships Program through which the best students were recruited to provide legal services to the poor. The program, from the 1970 administered by the Legal Service Corporation, was active until 1985. Between 1967 and 1985 approximately 2000 beginning lawyers, called Reggies, were endowed with the fellowship.
