= Tanya Neiman =

American lawyer

- Born: June 28, 1949; Pittsburgh, Pennsylvania, U.S.
- Died: February 27, 2006 (aged 56); San Francisco, California, U.S.
- Occupation: Lawyer

Tanya Marie Neiman (June 28, 1949 – February 27, 2006) was an American lawyer and activist based in San Francisco. For over 20 years, she was director of the Volunteer Legal Services Program of the Bar Association of San Francisco, now known as the Justice & Diversity Center, "one of the largest and most innovative legal services programs in the country to serve lower-income people".

== Early life and education ==
Neiman was born in Pittsburgh, Pennsylvania and raised in California, the daughter of Max Neiman and Helen Lamaga Neiman. She graduated from John H. Francis Polytechnic High School in 1966, earned a bachelor's degree in economics, philosophy, and politics from Mills College in 1970, and earned a Juris Doctor degree from University of California, Hastings College of the Law.

== Career ==
Neiman taught at Boalt Hall as a young woman. She joined the state Public Defender's Office in 1976. She became director of the Volunteer Legal Services Program (VLSP) of the Bar Association of San Francisco in 1982, and, in her long tenure as the program's head, is credited with turning the VLSP, now known as the Justice & Diversity Center (JDC), into "one of the largest and most innovative legal services programs in the country to serve lower-income people". She helped to found the AIDS Legal Referral Panel, the Domestic Violence Consortium, and the Eviction Defense Collaborative.

Neiman was honored by the National Legal Aid & Defender Association (NLADA) in 1996 with their Kutak-Dodds Prize. The State Bar of California gave her the Loren Miller Legal Services Award in 1998. She received a Frontline Award from the ACLU of Northern California in 2005. Just before she died in 2006, she received a Lifetime Achievement Award from the Bay Area Lawyers' Committee for Civil Rights.

== Publications ==
- "Teaching Woman Her Place: The Role of Public Education in the Development of Sex Roles" (1973)
- "A Community-Based Response to Welfare Reform" (1997)
- "Creating Community by Implementing Holistic Approaches to Solving Clients' Problems" (1999)
- "Legal Services Leadership on Job Development: The San Francisco Experience" (2000)

== Personal life and legacy ==
Neiman was known for wearing suits and bowties. In the 1970s, she had a longterm relationship with Mary Carolyn Morgan, who became the first openly lesbian judge in the United States in 1981, when she was appointed to the San Francisco Municipal Court by Governor Jerry Brown. Neiman and her partner Brett Mangels married at San Francisco City Hall in 2004. They were together for 24 years when Neiman died in 2006, from ovarian cancer, at the age of 56. Flags at San Francisco City Hall flew at half-staff after her death, and mayor Gavin Newsom said that "San Francisco has lost a great humanitarian and altruist".

The Tanya Neiman Building, home of the JDC's Homeless Advocacy Project, is named in her memory, as was the Tanya Neiman Pro Bono Professional of the Year Award, given by the National Association of Pro Bono Professionals.
