= Social work management =

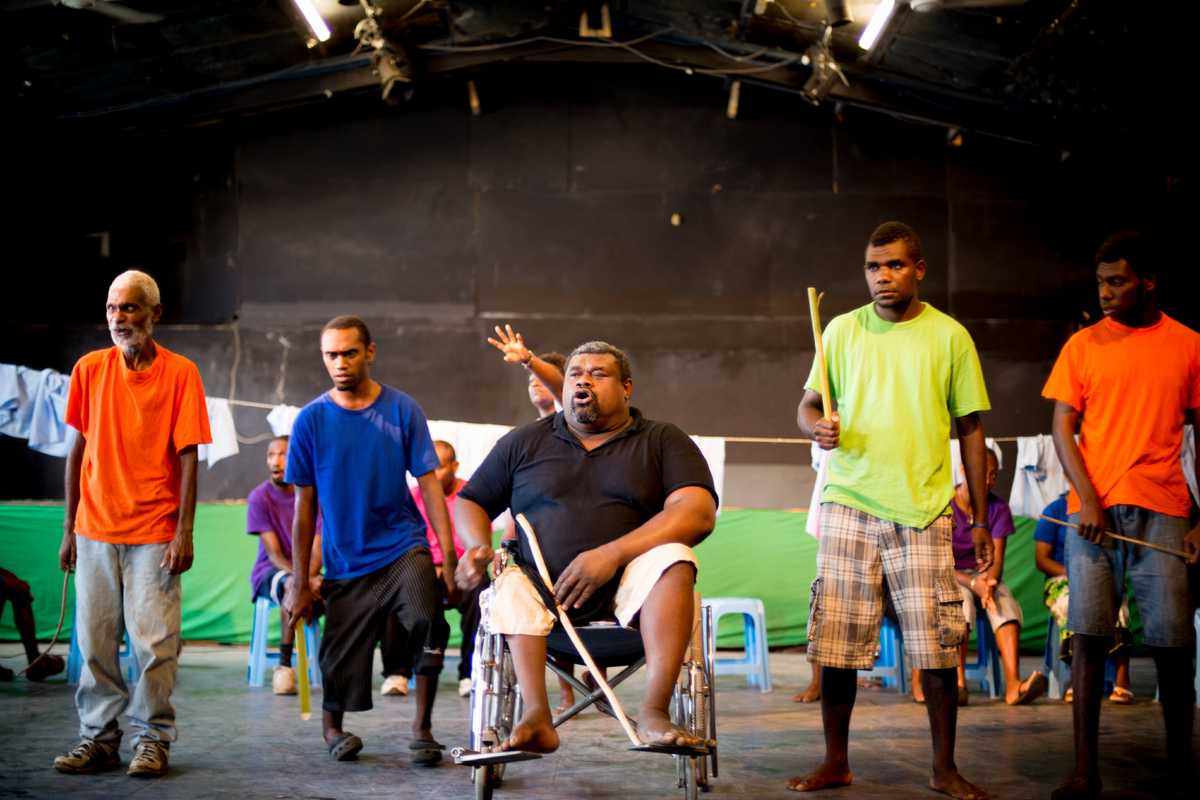
Local disability theatre group

Social work management is the management of organisations or enterprises in the social economy and non-profit organizations/sector such as public service providers, charities, youth welfare offices, associations, etc. Social work management has been traditionally pursued by social workers, social pedagogues, pedagogues, psychologists without additional management skills and knowledge or legal practitioners and business economists – often without reference to the social economy. Furthermore, social work management is a field of education & practice established since the 1980s in Europe & North America that focuses on person-centred leadership, motivation & strategic issues. Ethical and worforce challenges have emerged for managers and they need to be addressed. Managers in the field face challenges such as the pressure to meet targets and keep costs down while still keeping skiiled staf and protecting them from burnout.

== Definition ==
In today's understanding, social management includes all management functions that are necessary for the management of social and/or non-profit organizations. This includes finance and accounting of social organizations, development of mission statements and concepts, city and social marketing, public relations, organizational development, human resource management, project management, quality management and other sub-disciplines of management and business administration.

In contrast to management in other industries, branches and areas of the economy (e.g. sports management or media and education management), social work management takes into account characteristics especially of organizations in the social sector: the provision of person-centered social services, the peculiarities of non-profit organizations and, in particular, labour and welfare services, the close integration into the social law as well as the character of the services as merit goods. With the increasing spread of private providers, social work management is also referred to as the management of enterprises in the social economy. Against this background, social work management can also be understood as a so-called specialised form of business administration for social enterprises or companies.

Some authors also understand social work management as the management of people with special consideration of human relationships in the sense of human resources management. However, this understanding does not apply to all social services organizations. A systemic approach to social work management also takes into account emotions, different meanings, and various relationships. When providing social services, the focus lies on the professional development of empathic and trusting relationships with the recipients of these services.

== Theoretical Foundations ==
Figure 1: Hybrid Function of Social Work Management Education

The theoretical foundations of social work management are rooted in social work theories and principles as well as management studies. These theories help us understand how people act and how social and economic factors affect that behaviour. Theories like systems theory, psychodynamic theory, and human behaviour in the social environment theory are used to guide the way social work management is done. Understanding the theories behind social work management is important for making good decisions in the field that are socially sustainable.

Social Work management is an interdisciplinary and transdisciplinary subject that is marked by its hybrid function (see figure 1), including other academic disciplines such as business and economics, public management, social sciences, humanities, sustainability sciences, cultural studies, political sciences, law studies, etc.

== Principles ==
Some principles of social work management are also included in national quality standards (e.g. NASW Standards for Social Work Case Management).

== Methods of Teaching and Learning ==
Despite the fact that there is already a vast amount of literature available about management education and learning as well as social work education, the development of social work management education as a specific academic sub-discipline is still in progress and under discussion.

== Ethical and Workforce challenges for managers ==
There are ethical and workforce questions raised because of the pressure managers in social services. Since the 1990's, public management reforms have shaped public services. The growing interest in social work ethics is questioned to be whether a critique of these reforms or a part of them. Kivipelto and Matthies explain “real social work” as a practice that allows social workers to apply their ideals, ethics and standards. There are five mechanisms identified that help social workers carry out "real social work" despite managerialism which are role-taking, response, organizational autonomy and responsibility, collective attraction and cohesion and critical conscientiousness.. In a South African context, a study examined whether people without a social work background can manage and supervise social workers or not. A new further concern is about workforce well-being. A review covering more than 24 000 social workers gave some organizational solutions such as flexible working and wellnesses programs to avoid emotional exhaustion (burn-out, anxiety...). Expansion of staff competences is related to whether staff development plans are evaluated and if competences are defined for each job.
