= Financial deepening =

Financial deepening is a term used by economists to refer to increasing provision of financial services. It can refer both a wider choice of services and better access for different socioeconomic groups. Financial deepening can have an effect on both individuals' and societies' economic situations.

== Features ==
The following are examples of different forms of financial deepening. Provision for the unbanked and underbanked in a society. Development of financial markets. Development of financial institutions and increasing the diversity in financial instruments.

One of the key features of financial deepening is that it accelerates economic growth through the expansion of access to those who do not have adequate finance themselves. Typically, in an underdeveloped financial system, it is the incumbents who have better access to financial services through relationship banking. Moreover, incumbents also finance their growth through internal resource generation. Thus, in an underdeveloped financial system, growth is constrained to the expansion potential of incumbents. In mature financial systems on the other hand, financial institutions develop appraisal techniques, and information gathering and sharing mechanisms, which then enable banks to even finance those activities or firms that are at the margin, thereby leading to their growth-inducing productive activities in addition to the incumbents. The assumption is that the availability of external finance to budding entrepreneurs and small firms enables new entrepreneurship, while also providing competition to incumbents and consequently encouraging entrepreneurship and productivity. However, research indicates that widely available formal finance can produce informal intermediation, an unintended form of entrepreneurship. Hence, maintaining a sceptical approach when researching the effectiveness of initiatives is advisable.

== Macroeconomics ==
Financial deepening can have a macroeconomic effect for a country. Financial deepening generally can increase the ratio of money supply to GDP or some price index. It can have the effect of increasing liquidity. Having access to money can provide more opportunities for investment and growth.

A developed financial system broadens access to funds; Conversely, in an underdeveloped financial system, access to funds is limited and people are constrained by the availability of their own funds and have to resort to high cost informal sources such as money lenders. Lower the availability of funds and higher their cost, fewer would be the economic activities that can be financed and hence lower the resulting economic growth.

Promoting well-managed financial deepening in low-income countries (LICs) can enhance resilience and capacity to cope with shocks, improve macroeconomic policy effectiveness, and support solid and durable inclusive growth.

Financial deepening and macro-stability have been identified as a priority area in the years ahead for the Fund, as reflected in its Financial Surveillance Strategy paper.

Managing Volatility and Supporting Low-income Country Growth Enhancing macro-economic policy effectiveness Shallow financial systems limit fiscal, monetary, and exchange rate policy choices; hamper macroeconomic policy transmission; and impede opportunities for hedging or diversifying risk. This is of particular concern because LICs are vulnerable to external shocks, such as sharp swings in commodity prices and fluctuations in external financing. Limited policy space and instruments to mitigate the ensuing macroeconomic volatility often translate into large growth and welfare costs for these countries.

=== Economic growth ===
The association between economic growth and financial deepening has been a wide-ranging subject of experiential research. The practical evidence suggests that there is a significant positive relationship between financial development and economic growth.

Many economists support the theory that financial development spurs economic growth. Theoretically, financial development creates enabling conditions for growth through either a supply-leading (financial development spurs growth) or a demand-following (growth generates demand for financial products) channel. A large body of empirical research supports the view that development of the financial system contributes to economic growth. Empirical evidence consistently emphasises the nexus between finance and growth, though the issue of direction of causality is more difficult to determine. At the cross-country level, evidence indicates that various measures of financial development (including assets of the financial intermediaries, liquid liabilities of financial institutions, domestic credit to private sector, stock and bond market capitalisation) are robustly and positively related to economic growth. Other studies establish a positive relationship between financial development and growth at the industry level. Some supporters of the view that internal factors determine growth (endogenous growth theory) nevertheless assign a special role to finance.

Financial systems in developing countries became inclusive in the twenty first century. However, they are still undiversified and small.

== Personal finance ==
Financial deepening can play an important role in reducing risk and vulnerability for disadvantaged groups, and increasing the ability of individuals and households to access basic services like health and education. This can have direct impact on poverty reduction.

== Limitations ==
In developing countries policy and exogenous influences determine whether financial deepening achieves optimum results.

== Country specific experience ==
=== India ===
The All-India Debt and Investment Survey (AIDIS), 2002 raised concerns about financial inclusion, it may have reduced since 1990. After the green revolution focus has been on financing crop loans connected largely with food grains.

The Reserve Bank of India views the provision of banking to the poor as a viable business opportunity. It notes that costs and benefit exercises need to be attempted by the banks to make financial inclusion congruent with their business models.

== See also ==
- Development economics
- Economic development
- Financial ethics
- Financial inclusion
- Financial intelligence
- Financial social work
