= Charles Henry Dorsey Jr. =

American lawyer

Charles Henry Dorsey Jr. (May 18, 1930 - April 21, 1995) was born in Baltimore and attended St. Catherine Academy in Baltimore and Epiphany College, a Josephite seminary, in New York from 1947 to 1948. He transferred from Epiphany College to Loyola College in September 1949. He was the first black undergraduate student to enroll in Loyola College (now Loyola University Maryland).

== Integration at Loyola ==
The topic of integrating Loyola College came up in 1946 under the college's President Bunn. However, he was fearful that “‘the faculty and alumni would violently oppose black students’” who attended regular undergraduate classes. Even though black students were able to attend night classes during World War II, Dorsey was the first black student trying to enroll as a full time undergraduate. The next president of the College, President Talbot, was open to the idea of allowing black students attend Loyola College. At first, Dorsey was rejected admission because his courses were from a school that was not accredited by the Middle States Association, a regional collegiate agency. However, Josephites from the seminary Dorsey was enrolled in, visited Loyola numerous times to convince the Jesuits. After renewing his application, Dorsey was accepted into the Loyola College undergraduate program. The historic news was announced by President Talbot in April 1950.

=== Hollander Foundation Award ===
The admittance of Charles Dorsey led Loyola College to receive the Hollander Foundation Award. In 1947, the Sidney Hollander Foundation started giving out awards for “outstanding contributions ‘toward the achievement of equal rights and opportunities for Negroes in Maryland.’” Loyola College received the award in 1951 for not only admitting black students, but “for fully integrating minority students into both its curricular and its extracurricular activities.”

=== Military service ===
Even though he was admitted to Loyola College, Dorsey withdrew to enlist in the United States Air Force during the Korean War in May 1950. He served in the Air Force until 1956 and was discharged as a 1st lieutenant.

=== Education ===
Afterward, Dorsey went back to continue his education at Loyola in the fall of 1956. He acquired enough credits to transfer to University of Maryland Law School in 1957 and finished law school in 1961.

=== Legal career ===
His legal career started as an associate with Hyman Pressman, Esq. then later an associate with other black attorneys, George Russell, Emerson Brown, Milton Allen, Robert Watts, William Murphy and Charles Josey. He joined the Legal Aid Bureau in 1969, and became its director in 1974. As the director of the Legal Aid Bureau, it “expanded from three Baltimore offices to 13 offices throughout the state.” He fought for the rural and urban poor in Maryland and for the “equal access to justice for all people.” As the Bureau's director, “Dorsey was also a driving force behind Legal Aid’s downtown Baltimore headquarters, the first in the U.S. specifically designed and built to house a legal services operation.” He is regarded as the most influential leader of the Legal Aid Bureau.

=== Community service and awards ===
Charles Dorsey was an active member in his community in terms of legal committees and church activities. He was a member of numerous boards of directors in his parish including the Archdiocesan Council of Catholic Men, Archdiocesan Board of Education, and Associated Catholic Charities. Dorsey was also president of the Bar Association of Baltimore City and the first black lawyer of the Maryland State Board of Law Examiners. Dorsey has received countless awards for his legal work, community work and even has awards named after him for his legacy in public defending. A few of his awards include the Papal Order of Knights of St. Gregory, Reginald Heber Smith Award, and the John Minor Wisdom Public Service Award. The award named after him, The Charles Dorsey Award “is given to an individual who has provided extraordinary and dedicated service to the equal justice community and to organizations that promote expanding and improving access to justice for low-income people.”
