= Clinical Social Work Journal =

- Discipline: Social work
- Language: English
- Edited by: Melissa D. Grady

Publication details
- History: 1973-present
- Publisher: Springer Science+Business Media
- Frequency: Quarterly
- Impact factor: 1.787 (2020)

Standard abbreviations
- ISO 4: Clin. Soc. Work J.

Indexing
- ISSN: 0091-1674 (print); 1573-3343 (web)
- LCCN: 73643802
- OCLC no.: 299333432

Links
- Journal homepage; Online access

The Clinical Social Work Journal is a quarterly, peer-reviewed academic journal that publishes articles, commentaries, and book reviews relevant to contemporary clinical social work practice, research, theory, and policy. It is currently published by Springer Science+Business Media. The editor-in-chief is Melissa D. Grady (Catholic University of America). The journal was established in 1973. According to the Journal Citation Reports, the journal has a 2020 impact factor of 1.787.
