= Grover C. Gilmore =

American psychologist (born 1950)

Grover Cleveland Gilmore (born January 7, 1950) is an American psychologist and was Dean of the Mandel School of Applied Social Sciences at Case Western Reserve University from 2002 to 2021. He is known for work funded by the National Institute of Health studying changes in visual perception that are associated with healthy aging and with Alzheimer's disease. His hypothesis is that a portion of the cognitive problems associated with aging and the memory problems in Alzheimer's disease may be attributed to sensory decline and not to higher order cognitive functions.

Gilmore received his bachelor's degree in psychology from Brandeis University in 1971. He then attended Johns Hopkins University, earning an M.A. in 1974 and a Ph.D. in 1975. He has taught at Case Western since 1975.

In 1994 he was one of 52 signatories on "Mainstream Science on Intelligence," an editorial written by Linda Gottfredson and published in the Wall Street Journal, which declared the consensus of the signing scholars on issues related to the controversy about intelligence research that followed the publication of the book The Bell Curve. He is also on the editorial board of Intelligence.
