= Alberta College of Social Workers =

The Alberta College of Social Workers (ASCW) serves as the regulatory agency for the profession of social work in the province of Alberta, Canada. It is among 30 healthcare professions legislated under the Alberta's Health Profession Act (HPA). ACSW has the freedom to establish registration requirements, needed continuing competence, and obligation to set standards of practice & code of ethics, and conduct complaints and discipline activities.

== History ==
The Alberta College of Social Workers(ACSW) used to act as the professional association and the regulatory agency. Since 2020, ACSW is a single mandate organization that regulates social workers in the public interest in Alberta. The Alberta College of Social Workers, first created in the 1961 as the Alberta Association of Social Workers, and was part of the Canadian Association of Social Workers. After departing from it, the association has made continuous efforts, for a series of years, to become part of the Health Professions Act (HPA). This legislation requires professional colleges to follow similar regulations across the professions, and for the members to apply educational and practice standards. The ACSW attained success on April 1, 2003 on becoming a member of the Health Professions Act. Becoming a member under the Health Professions Act (HPA) was an important milestone for the Alberta College of Social Workers. It recognized social work as a self-regulated profession with legal authority, public accountability, and a responsibility to protect the public. However, the College never fully fulfilled its required mandate as a social unionism-style organization. In 2024, the College also announced its plan to move away from exclusionary rules that required internationally educated social workers to match mainstream or nonmarginalized groups standards. It now aims to create inclusive registration pathways that offer equal opportunities to marginalized groups and help all social workers take part fully and meaningfully in the workforce and in society.

== Organizational structure ==
The Alberta College of Social Workers' governance structure includes:

1. Governance Board with government appointed members and social workers
2. Regulatory Committees: Registration Committee, Competence Committee, Clinical Committee, and Professional Social Work Education Committee
3. Governance Committees: Executive Committee, Human Resources Committee, Bylaws & Policy Committee and Finance Committee
4. Standing & Adhoc Committees: Nominations & Recruitment Committee and Indigenous Social Work Committee
