= Cessie Alfonso =

American consultant and activist

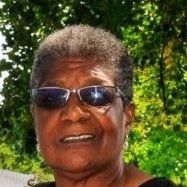
- Cessie Alfonso, c. 2018
- Born: Cecilia Alfonso; January 14, 1945 (age 81); New York City, New York, United States
- Occupations: Forensic social work, domestic violence prevention and response, and organizational development consultant and activist
- Years active: 1960s to present
- Known for: Pioneering use of forensic social work techniques to reduce death penalty sentencing of criminals in the United States

Cecilia "Cessie" Alfonso (born January 14, 1945) is an American forensic social work, domestic violence prevention and response, and organizational development consultant and activist who has protested against the Vietnam War and the use of the death penalty in the United States to prosecute criminals and in support of improved civil rights for women and the LGBT community.

The founder and president of Alfonso Consultants, Inc., she trained and worked as a social worker and has collaborated with civil and criminal defense attorneys nationally and internationally for more than three decades to provide psychosocial assessments and other social work support to their clients. During the course of her work, she and her colleagues have undertaken more than one thousand mitigation investigations.

== Formative years ==
Born in New York City, New York in the United States on January 14, 1945, Cecilia "Cessie" Alfonso is a first-generation, Caribbean American who attended the Montefiore School of Practical Nursing, where she earned her Licensed Practical Nurse degree in 1965. She was then awarded a Bachelor of Arts degree in psychology and sociology by Hood College; in 1977, she earned her Master of Social Work degree from the Graduate School of Social Work at Rutgers University.

Beginning in 1982, she was awarded a series of certifications and licenses, including the:

- CSW by the State of New York's Board of Higher Education (1982);
- ACSW by the National Association of Social Workers, Academy of Social Workers (1983);
- LCSW by the State of New Jersey's Board of Social Work Examiners (1983); and
- Diplomat status by the National Association of Social Workers (Clinical Registrar, Certified Social Work, School Field Instructor, 1985).

== Activism ==
During the 1960s and 1970s, she protested against the Vietnam War and for civil rights, women's rights and LGBT rights. She has also been a member of the Combahee River Collective, and has been active in trying to end the use of the death penalty in the United States.

== Nursing, social work and legal career ==
From 1969 to 1972, Alfonso worked as a licensed practical nurse in the operating room of Morrison Hospital in New York City. Her work related to the gynecological aspects of surgery. Between 1978 and 2000, Alfonso was employed as a social worker in clinical practice in New York and New Jersey, during which time she served as a psychiatric social worker, a clinical coordinator, a mental health specialist, and a drug counselor.

Beginning in 1984, Alfonso provided expert witness testimony about domestic violence-related topics in legal cases in Florida, Maryland, New Jersey, New York, and Pennsylvania. She also worked as a consultant and mitigation specialist on state and federal death penalty cases in Arizona, Florida, Georgia, Kentucky, Maryland, New Jersey, New York, Pennsylvania, Puerto Rico, and South Carolina.

From 1994 to 2012, Alfonso was employed by county and state public defenders' offices in Florida, Illinois, Indiana, Kentucky, Missouri, New Jersey, New York, and Wisconsin to provide training to their attorneys and other personnel regarding client-centered representation, trial preparation and presentation, mitigation and sentencing issues, and domestic violence-related topics. From 1995 to 2005, Alfonso also worked for Albany Law, training attorneys in cultural competency and client-centered representation. In addition, Alfonso worked as a faculty member of, and presenter for, the National Legal Aid & Defender Association from 1995 to 2010, providing training for attorneys, their staff and other social workers on such topics as the consideration of cultural differences in civil and criminal cases, defense-related issues in death penalty cases, preparing clients and their families for trial, the psychosexual dynamics of the serial rapist/killer, rage mitigation in domestic violence cases, and the preparation of witnesses for trial. She was also employed as a faculty member with the Clarence Darrow Death Penalty Defense College at DePaul University from 2005 to 2012, where she presented similar training programs and also addressed the impacts of poverty, race, gender, and class on attorneys' relationships with clients and in courtroom settings. During the fall of 2002, she was also employed as an adjunct professor by the department of math and sciences at the College of Saint Rose in Albany.

=== Founding of Alfonso Consultants to the present ===
In 1988, Alfonso founded and expanded Alfonso Consultants, Inc. to offer consultation services to civil and criminal defense attorneys nationally and internationally. In addition to providing psychosocial assessments and other social work support to the clients of those attorneys, she has provided consultation services to attorneys and their clients regarding more than seven hundred capital (death penalty) cases and has also undertaken more than one thousand mitigation investigations with colleagues in cases in Columbia, Cuba, El Salvador, Puerto Rico, and the United States. She has also served as an expert witness during the penalty phases of multiple death penalty cases.

She has also worked with the New York State Defenders Association since 2005, providing training to attorneys and other staff regarding the impacts of poverty, race, gender, and class on attorneys' relationships with clients and in courtroom settings and ways to foster client-center representation.

== Other community service efforts ==
Alfonso serves on the board of directors of Citizen Action of New York and is a former president of the board of the National Association of Sentencing Advocates. In 2017, she served on the Truth Commission on Poverty in New York State, which was established by the Labor-Religion Coalition of New York State.

=== News program and talk show appearances ===
Alfonso has been a guest on multiple news programs and talk shows throughout her career, including the following:

- "Battered Women's Syndrome," Sonya Live (CNN, 1990)
- "Alternative Sentencing" (BBC TV, 1993)
- "Battered Women's Syndrome," Sally Jesse Raphael Show (NBC, 1996)
- "Domestic Violence," Sally Jesse Raphael Show (NBC, 1997)
- "Women Who Stalk," Montel Williams Show (WOR-TV, 1998)
- "Forensic Social Worker," Social Worker Radio (WCDB Radio, 2017)
- "Social Work and the Death Penalty" (WOOC Radio, 2018)

== Publications ==
- Alfonso, C. and K. Baur, K. "Enhancing Capital Defense: The Role of the Forensic Clinical Social Worker." Washington, D.C.: The Champion, 1986.
- Alfonso, C. "Poverty and Its Impact on the Client-Attorney Relationship," in The Advocate, Vol. 13, No. 4, June 1991 (revised May 2006, Vol. 28, No. 3).
- Alfonso, C. "A Module: Training for Cultural Competence." Jersey City, New Jersey: Alfonso Associates, 1995.
- Alfonso, C. "Concerns and Considerations for Mitigation Specialists Handling International Investigations," in Cornerstone, Vol. 29, No. 2; September–December, 2007.

== Awards and other honors ==
Alfonso has been the recipient of numerous awards and other honors, including the:

- Trailblazer Award for Innovation and Leadership from New Jersey Social Work (1992);
- Innovation and Leadership—Edwin Gould Services Award from STEPS to End Family Violence (1995);
- Outstanding Faculty Member in the Defender Institute Basic Trial Skills Program Award from the New York State Defenders Association (June 2000);
- Mim George Award from the National Association of Sentencing (2005);
- Life in the Balance Achievement Award from the National Legal Aid & Defender Association (March 2008);
- Recognition Award presented by Governor Jon Corzine of New Jersey in recognition of her leading mitigation specialist work which contributed significantly to the abolition of the death penalty in New Jersey (2008); and
- Recognition Award for service as the first president of the National Association of Sentencing Advocates and Mitigation Specialists (March 2013).

== See also ==
- Capital punishment
- Capital punishment by country
- List of United States Supreme Court opinions involving capital punishment
