= Integrated social work =

Integrated social work refers to the use of a holistic approach in the practice of social work It differs from Eclecticism in that whilst eclectic social work uses differ parts of a variety of social work theories and models, integrative social work seeks to blend different theories, models, and methods into a personalized and coherent approach that provides lasting solutions to the problems and situations of individuals

An example occurs in working with children who are in conflict with the law. A social worker, to ensure effective problem solving does not only deal with the juvenile, but also must involve the family or families involved and the community in which the child lives. To add to his or her knowledge base of solving such problems, the social worker thus needs to conduct social research and administration. This means that they may use a blend of person-centered, cognitive, and systems theory to create a unique assessment and intervention plan for the young person.

In integrated social work, there is a need to use these social methods together with the theories, values, and ethics of social work practice.
