= Forensic social work =

Social work as applied to the law

Forensic social work is the application of social work to questions and issues relating to the law and legal systems. It is a type of social work that involves the application of social work principles and practices in legal, criminal, and civil contexts. It is a specialized branch of social work that focuses on the intersection of law and mental health. Forensic social work is an important part of the criminal justice system and provides an important link between mental health and the legal system.

Forensic social workers play an important role in the legal system. They assess individuals who have been accused of a crime, evaluate their mental health, provide expert testimony in court, and provide counseling and other services to victims and offenders. Forensic social workers may also be involved in the development of public policy related to mental health and criminal justice. Forensic social workers are trained to assess individuals in a variety of contexts, such as prisons, juvenile detention centers, and family court proceedings. They are knowledgeable about the criminal justice system and the psychological effects of crime and trauma. Forensic social workers also provide counseling and therapy to victims and offenders and may provide support to families who have been affected by crime or trauma. Forensic social workers must be knowledgeable about the legal system, mental health issues, and the psychological effects of crime and trauma. They must also be familiar with the ethical principles of social work and be able to work with a variety of clients and stakeholders. Forensic social workers must be knowledgeable about the law and be able to provide testimony in court. They must be able to communicate effectively with lawyers, judges, and other legal professionals. In order to become a forensic social worker, individuals must typically have a master's degree in social work. In addition, they must have a license to practice social work. Individuals who wish to specialize in forensic social work may take additional courses or pursue a doctorate degree in forensic social work.

This specialty of the social work profession goes far beyond clinics and psychiatric hospitals for criminal defendants being evaluated and treated on issues of competency and responsibility. A broader definition includes social work practice that is in any way related to legal issues and litigation, both criminal and civil. Child custody issues involving separation, divorce, neglect, termination of parental rights, the implications of child and spousal abuse, juvenile and adult justice services, corrections, and mandated treatment all fall under this definition. A forensic social worker may also be involved in policy or legislative development intended to improve social justice.

== Functions ==
Forensic social work practitioners provide a wide range of services to individuals, families, and communities affected by crime, violence, and other legal issues. Typically, they work in collaboration with attorneys, criminal justice professionals, and other practitioners to ensure that clients' rights and needs are being met. Broadly, the functions of forensic social work practitioners include:

- Assessing client needs: Forensic social workers conduct comprehensive assessments of clients to identify their needs. This includes gathering information about their current situation, their history, and any factors that may be impacting their ability to make decisions or cope with their current situation.
- Developing treatment plans: Forensic social workers help create individualized treatment plans for clients. This includes setting goals, developing strategies, and collaborating with other professionals to ensure that clients are receiving the best possible care.
- Providing psychotherapy: Forensic social workers provide psychotherapy to clients and their families. This can include helping them cope with the trauma of being involved in a crime, as well as providing support, guidance, and education to help them make positive changes in their lives.
- Advocating for clients: Forensic social workers often act as advocates for their clients, advocating for their rights and needs. This includes helping them navigate the criminal justice system, ensuring that they understand their rights, and helping them access the resources they need.
- Conducting risk assessments: Forensic social workers conduct risk assessments to determine a client's likelihood of engaging in criminal or violent behavior. This assessment helps inform decisions about whether or not a client should be released from custody or placed on supervision.
- Facilitating communication: Forensic social workers often act as mediators, facilitating communication between clients, their families, and other professionals. This can include helping to resolve conflicts, encouraging dialogue, and supporting clients in making decisions.
- Educating clients: Forensic social workers often provide education and resources to their clients, helping them understand their situations and the options available to them. This includes providing information about their rights, the legal system, and other resources that may be available to them.
- Other functions:
  - Policy and program development
  - Mediation, advocacy, and arbitration
  - Teaching, training, and supervising
  - Behavioral science research and analysis

Forensic social work practitioners engage only in forensic activities within their areas of competence and expertise.

== Historical development ==
=== United Kingdom ===
The first appointment of a psychiatric social worker in London was in 1936. The British Association of Psychiatric Social Workers was inaugurated only in 1930. Most of the expertise in England and Wales has been concentrated within the specialist hospitals. – Ashworth, Rampton and Broadmoor. At Broadmoor Hospital the first qualified mental health social worker was not employed until 1969.

The Central Council for Training and Education in Social Work (which was responsible for promoting education and training in social work between 1971 and 2001) defined forensic social work as "social work with mentally disordered people who present, or are subject to, significant risk and as a consequence are, or could be, in contact with the criminal justice system... The key purpose of forensic social work is to hold in balance the protection of the public and the promotion of the quality of life of individuals and by working in partnership with relevant others to identify, assess and manage risk; identify and challenge discriminatory structures and practices; engage effectively and identify, develop and implement strategies."

=== America ===
Forensic social work has been done in America since at least 1899, coming out in part of the settlement house movement, and the expansion of urban charity work.

=== Nigeria ===
The history of social work in Nigeria dates back to the late 19th century when Christian missionaries arrived in the country to spread their faith and provide humanitarian aid. These missionaries provided healthcare, education, and social services to the local populations, but their work was mainly directed at the wealthier classes. As the country developed, the government began to provide more social services, with social work becoming a formal profession in the 1950s. The first organized social work organization in Nigeria was the Nigerian Association of Social Workers (NASW), which was founded in 1950. This organization was responsible for the training of social workers and the development of a code of ethics for the profession. The association also established a social work journal and organized conferences and workshops on social welfare issues. In the 1960s, the Nigerian government passed the Social Welfare Act, which provided for the establishment of a national Social Welfare Board. This board was responsible for formulating and implementing social welfare policies and for monitoring and evaluating the performance of social workers. The board also established a National Institute of Social Work, which was responsible for the training of social workers and the development of standards and guidelines for the profession. In the 1970s, the government passed the Social Welfare Regulations which provided for the establishment of a National Council of Social Workers (NCSW). The council was responsible for setting standards for the practice of social work, for regulating the profession, and for administering the Social Welfare Act. The 1980s saw increased government involvement in the social work profession. The government enacted the Social Work Act of 1981, which provided for the registration of social workers and the establishment of a disciplinary tribunal to investigate and punish social workers who violated the code of ethics. The government also provided additional funding for the training of social workers and the development of social work programs. The 1990s saw significant changes in the social work profession in Nigeria. The government passed the Social Welfare (Amendment) Act of 1998, which provided for the establishment of a National Board of Social Workers. This board was responsible for the registration of social workers, the setting of standards for the profession, the investigation and discipline of social workers, and the accreditation of social work programs. In the 2000s, the government passed the Social Welfare (Amendment) Act of 2004, which provided for the establishment of a National Agency for Social Work. This agency was responsible for the implementation of social welfare policies, the regulation of social work, and the development of social work programs. It also established a social work council, which was responsible for setting standards for the practice of social work, for registering social workers, and for administering the Social Work Act. Today, the social work profession in Nigeria has grown significantly. The government has supported the profession through the provision of funding for training and the development of social work programs. The profession is regulated by the Social Work Council, which is responsible for setting standards for the practice of social work and for registering social workers. The profession is also supported by the National Association of Social Workers (NASW), which provides a platform for social workers to share their experiences and expertise.

=== Spain ===
In Spain, the inclusion of social workers in the administration of justice began in the early 1990s, which has posed significant challenges for professionals. In her book "The Social Worker as a Judicial Expert," Pilar Ruiz, a social worker who serves as an expert witness in the courts of first instance and instruction in Logroño, has provided contributions based on her experience in areas such as juvenile justice and child protection.

== Role of the social worker ==
The social worker bridges the gap between hospital and community.

=== United States ===
In the United States forensic social workers have a variety of functions, including social assessments for various courts, including family court, and providing assessments and aftercare for psychiatric hospitals.

=== United Kingdom ===
In the U.K. forensic social workers have several duties, including applications for hospital admission and when necessary, arranging aftercare (under s.117 of the Mental Health Act 1983) and social assessments. Psychiatric social workers are now called "mental health professionals", "mental health social workers". An Approved Mental Health Professional is often located within a community mental health team, hospital or based in the local authority. Social workers fulfill the role of social supervisors to specify suitable accommodations for discharged patients, and to assess risk. They provide specialist social care reports to the Mental Health First Tier Tribunal.

The Department of Health in England currently identifies the following functions as being key to the social work role: • assessment • care co-ordination • report writing and presentation • working with individuals and families • working in collaboration with service users and carers • undertaking social supervision with conditionally discharged patients and the supervision of those subject to supervision and in the case of those within forensic community teams, community treatment orders • working with external agencies and multi-agency public protection arrangements (MAPPAs) • continuing professional development

Social workers in the community are commonly appointed as "social supervisors" to patients who are subject to conditional discharge has been discharge under section 41 of the Mental Health Act 1983. Social supervisors support the person in the community but also provide regular reports to the Ministry of Justice about their progress and may recommend their recall to hospital.

=== Nigeria ===
Social workers in Nigeria provide individuals, families, and communities with the resources and support they need to cope with life's challenges. Social workers in Nigeria help to identify and address the social, economic and environmental issues that can lead to poverty, inequality and other forms of social injustice. Social workers in Nigeria typically provide a range of services to individuals, families and communities. These may include: • Providing emotional support and guidance to individuals and families in difficult situations. • Assessing and evaluating clients' needs, abilities, and circumstances. • Developing and implementing plans to help clients achieve their goals. • Referring clients to appropriate resources and services in the community. • Providing support and advocacy for those facing discrimination or social injustice. • Educating communities about social issues and advocating for policy change. • Researching and analyzing social problems. • Developing strategies to address social issues. • Participating in interdisciplinary teams on behalf of clients. • Participating in activities to promote social change. Social workers in Nigeria have an important role to play in improving the quality of life of those they serve, and in helping to create a more equitable and just society.

== See also ==
- Psychiatric social work
- Cessie Alfonso
