= Justice and the Poor =

Justice and the Poor is a book on law and ethics first published in 1919, promoting the concept of free legal assistance for the poor. It was written by Reginald Heber Smith, director of the Boston Legal Aid Society.

Smith challenged the legal profession to consider it an obligation to see that access to justice was available to all, without regard to ability to pay. "Without equal access to the law," he wrote, "the system not only robs the poor of their only protection, but places in the hands of their oppressors the most powerful and ruthless weapon ever invented."

As a result of Smith's book, the American Bar Association created the Special Committee on Legal Aid Work. By the middle of the 20th century, virtually every major metropolitan area had some kind of legal aid program.
