= Council on Social Work Education =

Nonprofit association in the United States

- Abbreviation: CSWE
- Formation: January 1952
- Merger of: American Association of Schools of Social Work, National Association of Schools of Social Administration
- Type: Nonprofit
- President and CEO: Halaevalu Fonongava'inga Ofahengaue Vakalahi (2022–)
- Website: https://www.cswe.org/

The Council on Social Work Education (CSWE) is a nonprofit national association in the United States representing more than 2,500 individual members, as well as graduate and undergraduate programs of professional social work education. Founded in 1952, this partnership of educational and professional institutions, social welfare agencies, and private citizens is recognized by the Council for Higher Education Accreditation as the sole accrediting agency for social work education in the United States.

== History ==
The Summer School of Philanthropy was founded in 1898 by the Charity Organization Society of New York in New York City, and was soon followed by additional training schools for social workers in Boston, Chicago, St. Louis, and Philadelphia. In 1919, the Association of Training Schools for Professional Social Workers was established, later renamed the American Association of Schools of Social Work, or AASSW.

It established formal accrediting procedures in 1932, although the American Association of Medical Social Workers and the American Association of Psychiatric Social Workers had accrediting processes in place for their particular specialties.

In 1937 AASSW's move to limit its membership to graduate schools caused state higher education institutions to form the National Association of Schools of Social Administration (NASSA). NASSA representatives felt that social worker shortages demanded a more generalist approach to social work education. The two systems, however, frustrated the education community and resulted in the removal of accreditation authority from both groups.

This move led AASSW, NASSA, and others to establish the National Council on Social Work Education in 1946. This group studied the issues and produced Social Work Education in the United States.

The report recommended that a sole organization be founded that would permit the many elements within the social work profession to participate in setting and maintaining accreditation criteria. AASSW and NASSA were dissolved, and CSWE was born in January 1952 with the following statement of purpose: "to promote the development of sound programs of social work education in the United States, its territories and possessions, and Canada".

Helen R. Wright, dean of the University of Chicago's School of Social Service Administration, was named CSWE's first president, and Katherine A. Kendall, who had worked for the Children's Bureau of the United Nations and AASSW, was appointed CSWE's executive secretary.

In October 1961 the CSWE board adopted Social Welfare Content in Undergraduate Education as an aid to higher education institutions that wished to develop such programs. In 1973, CSWE issued accreditation standards covering content in the social work curriculum, staffing, and organization of social welfare programs at the undergraduate level, and in 1974, the National Commission on Accrediting formally authorized CSWE to accredit baccalaureate social work programs. It issued a revised curriculum policy statement in 1982 that included curriculum policy for BSW programs (CSWE, 1982). The CSWE Educational Policy and Accreditation Standards were last revised in 2015. Because CSWE's focus has been on the quality of education for individuals intending to engage in professional social work practice, it has never accredited social work programs at the associate's or doctoral level.

The CSWE is the only organization that provides accreditation for all online baccalaureate and master's social work programs in the United States.

The association was originally based in New York City, moving to Washington, D.C., in 1984 and to Alexandria, Virginia, in 1990.

=== Canada ===
Until 1970, CSWE accredited Canadian master's of social work programs until the Canadian Association for Social Work Education (CASWE-ACFTS) took over the accreditation of programs. The Canadian Association of Social Workers took over assessing whether a foreign social work degree an individual has earned could be considered equivalent in value and recognition to a recognized Canadian education. A CASW equivalency, such as a recognized foreign MSW, can serve as an equivalent accredited program for admission into advanced MSW standing according to CASWE's educational policies, so an international student’s prior MSW is considered in fairness. CSWE continued to accredit Canadian MSW programs on request until 1983. Currently, CASWE-ACFTS oversees accredited social work programs across various institutions throughout Canada.

== Conferences ==
In September 2013, Darla Coffey, CSWE President, organized the first White House Briefing for Social Work Education coordinated through the White House Office of Public Engagement. Presentations were given by federal officials from the Substance Abuse and Mental Health Services Administration (SAMHSA), the Department of Health and Human Services (DHHS), and the National Institutes of Health (NIH).

== Presidents ==
Past presidents of the CSWE:

- Halaevalu F. O. Vakalahi, 2022–present
- Darla Spence Coffey, 2012–2022
- Julia M. Watkins, 2010–2012
- Ira C. Colby, 2007–2010
- Kay S. Hoffman, 2004–2007
- Frank R. Baskind, 2001–2004
- Barbara W. White, 1998–2001
- Moses Newsome, Jr., 1995–1998
- Michael L. Frumpkin, 1992–1995
- Julia M. Norlin, 1989–1992
- M. C. "Terry" Hokenstad, 1986–1989
- Bradford W. Sheafor, 1984–1986
- Richard A. English, 1981–1984
- Dorothy Bird Daly, 1978–1981
- James R. Dumpson, 1972–1978
- Alton A. Linford, 1969–1972
- Herman D. Stein, 1966–1969
- Roger Cumming, 1963–1966
- Ruth E. Smalley, 1960–1963
- Grace L. Coyle, 1958–1960
- Jane M. Hoey, 1956–1958
- Fedele F. Fauri, 1954–1956
- Helen R. Wright, 1952–1954

== See also ==
- Council on Higher Education Accreditation
- Graduate School of Social Work at the University of Denver
- International Association of Schools of Social Work (IASSW)
- Professional development
- List of recognized accreditation associations of higher learning
- School accreditation
- United States Department of Education
