= Billable hours =

Billable hours are hours worked by an employee for an employer that are billed to the employer's client. In certain professions, particularly in law firms, employees are required to bill a certain number of hours per month or per year, and those who bill more hours may obtain additional benefits such as larger bonuses or faster promotions. However, the practice of using billable hours has also been criticized for a number of reasons. Various forms of technology have been developed to track the billable hours generated by employees.

== Use ==
Billable hours are the most used by most private lawyers and law firms to calculate the value of their work, with clients being assessed "a set rate, plus expenses, for each hour that the lawyer — or those working with the lawyer — devote to the case".

In well-managed firms, billable hours are monitored monthly to project cash flow and to find out who is working and who is not. A decrease in billable hours invariably translates to reduced collections some time in the near future.

Billable hours are "the hours for which clients are charged", while "some hours worked by the firms staff are not billable because the staff members are not involved in a consulting job for a client". The terminology is not uniform across industries, as "lawyers, consultants and accountants use the term 'billable hours', while marketing communications firms refer to 'utilization rates' or 'chargeability'". The primary alternatives to billable hours are a flat rate for specific transactions, or the assessment of a contingent fee for the entirety of a given matter.

Billable hours are typically measured by recording time in six-minute intervals.

== Criticisms ==
One court has noted that "problems created by billable hours have brought about a storm of criticism directed to the legal profession, especially when there are excessive billable hours". Criticisms of billable hours include the fact that a person doing more hours of work is not necessarily doing a high quality of work, and that work quality may in fact be diminished over time by an excessive workload. Lawyers trying to increase their billable hours may behave in ways that are not in the interests of the client.

Firms relying on a billable hours performance standard should also note that, while easily observable, quantifiable, and certainly relevant to the law firm's goals, such a standard does not measure the quality of a lawyer's work (except to the extent that sloppy work has to be redone, occasioning even more hours) nor does it begin to consider career development.

Furthermore, billable hours often do not encompass all of the work that employees are required to do, for example excluding work for the firm that is not billed to a particular client. It has been noted that firms with high billable hours requirements may lag behind in terms of pro bono work, and that other tasks falling outside of the billable hours requirement may be given inadequate attention. Billable hours "create an economic incentive for lawyers to charge for every hour of work that can be identified".

[B]illed hours will expand to fill the time requirements. Partners will end up doing associates' work to fill out their expected hours; Associates will end up doing paralegal work; paralegals will do secretarial work; and secretaries will find themselves with less work, occasioning in some instances the laying off of support staff as the product of a reduced workload. All of this may be to the clients detriment.

== See also ==
- Attorney's fee
