= Canadian Association of Social Workers =

National association in Canada

The Canadian Association of Social Workers (CASW) is the national association for the social work profession in Canada.

== Introduction ==
Canadian Association of Social Workers (CASW) was founded in 1926 to establish standards of practice for social workers. It has individual members, and 10 provincial and territorial partner organizations. Its mission objective is to promote positive social services, protect the professionals of social work from mistreatment in Canada, satiate social needs of Canadians by influencing policies and advancing social justice.

In 1975, the CASW evolved into a national federation by uniting various provincial associations. By 2010, it represented approximately 18,000 social workers across Canada. However, its national influence gradually diminished due to the withdrawal of key member organizations and the rising influence of the Canadian Council of Social Work Regulators, established in 2010.

The first significant departure occurred in 2003 when the Ordre professionnel des travailleurs sociaux du Québec (OPTSQ) withdrew from CASW, citing financial concerns. As the largest provincial association at the time, its exit substantially weakened CASW’s influence. In 2011, the Alberta College of Social Workers (ACSW) and the Ontario Association of Social Workers (OASW) also withdrew, resulting in the loss of over half of CASW’s total membership. Given that CASW depended largely on membership fees for funding, these departures placed severe financial pressure on the organization.

Although financial considerations were a factor, the withdrawals were primarily attributed to dissatisfaction with CASW’s governance and mandate. In response, CASW initiated an extensive organizational review in 2009, enlisting consulting services of AGORA to assess its operations. To alleviate financial strain, CASW introduced a 20% membership fee reduction for ACSW and OASW members and proposed significant structural reforms. Despite these efforts, both organizations proceeded with their exit, raising questions about the underlying reasons for their decisions.

Following these changes, OASW’s regulatory authority shifted to the Ontario College of Certified Social Workers (OCCSW), which had been established in 1982 and initially offered voluntary certification. This transition further diminished OASW’s role as a professional body providing professional liability insurance to social workers. To access this insurance, OASW requires registered social workers to first obtain it's costly membership, to help cover its operational costs.

Since the fragmentation of the single system, cross-provincial practice mobility has been eliminated. Each provincial regulatory body has established its own processes without aligning to a unified standard. In the absence of an overarching authority, many have fallen into predatory business practices and continue to sustain protective measures that were relevant during a period preceding the Canadian Charter of Rights and Freedoms in 1982, when Canada's legal system was still in a formative stage. Additionally, insufficient funding and the absence of service-oriented policies have left provincial boards struggling to provide effective, guided services, while resources are increasingly diverted to redundant administrative costs that were previously streamlined under a single unified body.

Despite these, CASW remains a member of the International Federation of Social Workers (IFSW) and continues to assess the credentials of internationally trained social workers. It makes policies and offers advice, decides ethics, It is now primarily involved in policy development, ethical oversight, and professional support services. However, unlike in the past, CASW faces growing challenges in advocacy and ability to meaningfully engage in social worker certification due to the decentralized system. Limited financial support from Employment and Social Development Canada and provincial authorities further worsens these challenges. Provinces now create policies independently and work with ASWB, a U.S.-based for-profit organization, for social worker assessments. This process is controversial, lacking relevance to Canadian policies and legal frameworks, raising doubts about its suitability for registration. The use of ASWB, even for Canadian candidates, is contentious, as it does not align with Canadian educational standards or educational program content. In the U.S., the ASWB exam is used for domestic and international candidates seeking registered practice. However, in Canada, certain regulatory bodies specifically use it to verify the qualifications of BIPOC candidates, while domestically educated candidates are not trained according to the American key content areas. Economic and race-affirming advantages drive many regulatory bodies to adopt it. Generally criticized for its pattern and development, the ASWB exam is specifically faulted for its lack of relevance to Canadian policies and legal frameworks. However, supporters of ASWB examinations point to the involvement of Canadian-educated and sometimes registered social workers in the exam development process as a justification for its validity, while selectively ignoring the statistical evidence against the examination. Historically, the exam has been known to be driven by question design quirks aimed at achieving differential results rather than assessing essential competency, leading to its reputation as a complicated reading comprehension test. Empowering CASW at the federal level is crucial for promoting ethical, fair, and legally protective practices in the Canadian social work profession. As an umbrella organization in Canada, CASW previously represented Canadian Social Work professionals. It is essential to empower such an organization to establish Canadian capacity to tailor examinations to the Canadian context, considering the unique social work landscape, demographics, ethics, and legal frameworks. Providing national importance to CASW is seen as essential by stakeholders for leading collaboration with territorial partner organizations and provincial universities, for facilitating the creation of an anti-oppressive licensing process that reflects the Canadian social work domain.

The CASW's Code of Ethics, last updated in 2005, together with its Guidelines for Ethical Practice, serve as the benchmark for ethical social work practice in Canada.

== Provincial and territorial partner organizations ==
CASW has nine provincial and territorial partners in Canada, representing all provinces and territories with the exception of Ontario and Québec. Affiliate memberships are offered to Social Workers in provinces not represented by a partner organization.

- British Columbia Association of Social Workers (BCASW)
- Alberta College of Social Workers (ACSW)
- Saskatchewan Association of Social Workers (SASW)
- Manitoba College of Social Workers (MCSW)
- New Brunswick Association of Social Workers (NBASW)
- Nova Scotia College of Social Workers (NSCSW)
- Prince Edward Island Association of Social Workers (PEIASW)
- Newfoundland and Labrador College of Social Workers (NLCSW)
- Association of Social Workers in Northern Canada (ASWNC), representing Yukon, Northwest Territories, and Nunavut

== See also ==
- History of Canadian Psychiatric Social Work
- International Association of Schools of Social Work (IASSW)
