= Social work =

Academic discipline and profession

Occupation
- Names: Licensed Clinical Social Worker, Licensed Master Social Worker, Licensed Advanced Practicing Social Worker, Registered Social Worker
- Activity sectors: Social welfare, social services, government, health, public health, mental health, occupational safety and health, community organization, non-profit, law, corporate social responsibility, human rights

Description
- Competencies: Improving the social environment and well-being of people by facilitating, and developing resources
- Education required: Bachelor of Social Work (BSW), Bachelor of Arts (BA) in Social Work, Bachelor of Science in Social Work (BSc) or a Postgraduate Diploma in Social Work (PGDipSW) for general practice; Master of Social Work (MSW), Master of Science in Social Work (MSSW) for clinical practice; Doctorate of Social Work (DSW) or Professional Doctorate (ProfD or DProf) for or specialized practice; Accredited educational institution; Registration and licensing differs depending on country
- Fields of employment: Child and women protection services, non-profit organizations, government agencies, disadvantaged groups centers, hospitals, schools, churches, shelters, community agencies, social planning services, think tanks, correctional services, labor and industry services

Social work is an academic discipline and practice-based profession concerned with meeting the basic needs of individuals, families, groups, communities, and society as a whole to enhance their individual and collective well-being. Social work practice draws from liberal arts, social science, and interdisciplinary areas such as psychology, sociology, health, political science, community development, law, and economics to engage with systems and policies, conduct assessments, develop interventions, and enhance social functioning and responsibility. The ultimate goals of social work include the improvement of people's lives, alleviation of biopsychosocial concerns, empowerment of individuals and communities, and the achievement of social reform.

Social work practice is often divided into three levels. Micro-work involves working directly with individuals and families, such as providing individual counseling/therapy or assisting a family in accessing services. Mezzo-work involves working with groups and communities, such as conducting group therapy or providing services for community agencies. Macro-work involves fostering change on a larger scale through advocacy, social policy, research development, non-profit and public service administration, or working with government agencies. Starting in the 1960s, a few universities began social work management programmes, to prepare students for the management of social and human service organizations, in addition to classical social work education.

The social work profession developed in the 19th century, with some of its roots in voluntary philanthropy and in grassroots organizing. However, responses to social needs had existed long before then, primarily from public almshouses, private charities and religious organizations. The effects of the Industrial Revolution and of the Great Depression of the 1930s placed pressure on social work to become a more defined discipline as social workers responded to the child welfare concerns related to widespread poverty and reliance on child labor in industrial settings.

== Definition ==
Social work is a broad profession that intersects with several disciplines. Social work organizations offer the following definitions:

Social work is a practice-based profession and an academic discipline that promotes social change and development, social cohesion, and the empowerment and liberation of people. Principles of social justice, human rights, collective responsibility and respect for diversities are central to social work. Underpinned by theories of social work, social sciences, humanities, and indigenous knowledge, social work engages people and structures to address life challenges and enhance well-being.

—International Federation of Social Workers

Social work is a profession concerned with helping individuals, families, groups and communities to enhance their individual and collective well-being. It aims to help people develop their skills and their ability to use their resources and those of the community to resolve problems. Social work is concerned with individual and personal problems but also with broader social issues such as poverty, unemployment, and domestic violence.

— Canadian Association of Social Workers

Social work practice consists of the professional application of social principles, and techniques to one or more of the following ends: helping people obtain tangible services; counseling and psychotherapy with individuals, families, and groups; helping communities or groups provide or improve social and health services, and participating in legislative processes. The practice of social work requires knowledge of human development and behavior; of social and economic, and cultural institutions; and the interaction of all these factors.

—[US] National Association of Social Workers

Social workers work with individuals and families to help improve outcomes in their lives. This may be helping to protect vulnerable people from harm or abuse or supporting people to live independently. Social workers support people, act as advocates and direct people to the services they may require. Social workers often work in multi-disciplinary teams alongside health and education professionals.

—British Association of Social Workers

== History ==
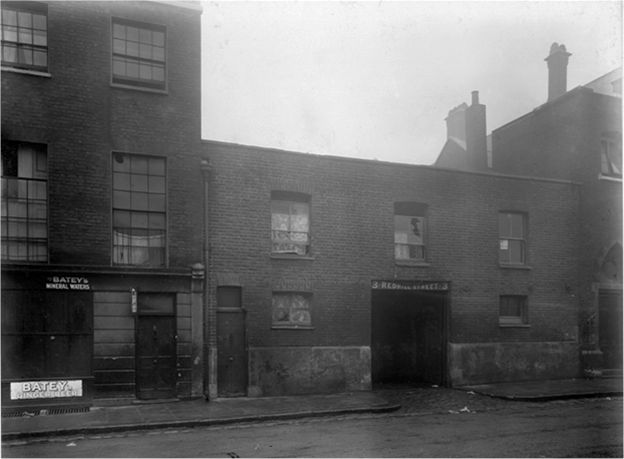
A Marylebone slum in the 19th century

The practice and profession of social work has a relatively modern and scientific origin, and is generally considered to have developed out of three strands. The first was individual casework, a strategy pioneered by the Charity Organization Society in the mid-19th century, which was founded by Helen Bosanquet and Octavia Hill in London, England. Most historians identify COS as the pioneering organization of the social theory that led to the emergence of social work as a professional occupation. COS had its main focus on individual casework. The second was social administration, which included various forms of poverty relief – 'relief of paupers'. Statewide poverty relief could be said to have its roots in the English Poor Laws of the 17th century but was first systematized through the efforts of the Charity Organization Society. The third consisted of social action – rather than engaging in the resolution of immediate individual requirements, the emphasis was placed on political action working through the community and the group to improve their social conditions and thereby alleviate poverty. This approach was developed originally by the Settlement House Movement.

This was accompanied by a less easily defined movement; the development of institutions to deal with the entire range of social problems. All had their most rapid growth during the nineteenth century, and laid the foundation basis for modern social work, both in theory and in practice.

Professional social work originated in 19th century England, and had its roots in the social and economic upheaval wrought by the Industrial Revolution, in particular, the societal struggle to deal with the resultant mass urban-based poverty and its related problems. Because poverty was the main focus of early social work, it was intricately linked with the idea of charity work.

Other important historical figures that shaped the growth of the social work profession are Jane Addams, who founded the Hull House in Chicago and won the Nobel Peace Prize in 1931; Mary Ellen Richmond, who wrote Social Diagnosis, one of the first social workbooks to incorporate law, medicine, psychiatry, psychology, and history; and William Beveridge, who created the social welfare state, framing the debate on social work within the context of social welfare provision.

=== United States ===
During the 1840s, Dorothea Lynde Dix, a retired Boston teacher who is considered the founder of the Mental Health Movement, began a crusade that would change the way people with mental disorders were viewed and treated. Dix was not a social worker; the profession was not established until after she died in 1887. However, her life and work were embraced by early psychiatric social workers (mental health social worker/clinical social worker), and she is considered one of the pioneers of psychiatric social work along with Elizabeth Horton, who in 1907 was the first social worker to work in a psychiatric setting as an aftercare agent in the New York hospital systems to provide post-discharge supportive services.

The early twentieth century marked a period of progressive change in attitudes towards mental illness. The increased demand for psychiatric services following the First World War led to significant developments. In 1918, Smith College School for Social Work was established, and under the guidance of Mary C. Jarrett at Boston Psychopathic Hospital, students from Smith College were trained in psychiatric social work. She first gave social workers the "Psychiatric Social Worker" designation. A book titled "The Kingdom of Evils," released in 1922, authored by a hospital administrator and the head of the social service department at Boston Psychopathic Hospital, described the roles of psychiatric social workers in the hospital. These roles encompassed casework, managerial duties, social research, and public education. After World War II, a series of mental hygiene clinics were established. The Community Mental Health Centers Act was passed in 1963. This policy encouraged the deinstitutionalisation of people with mental illness. Later, the mental health consumer movement came by 1980s. A consumer was defined as a person who has received or is currently receiving services for a psychiatric condition. People with mental disorders and their families became advocates for better care. Building public understanding and awareness through consumer advocacy helped bring mental illness and its treatment into mainstream medicine and social services. The 2000s saw the managed care movement, which aimed at a health care delivery system to eliminate unnecessary and inappropriate care to reduce costs, and the recovery movement, which by principle acknowledges that many people with serious mental illness spontaneously recover and others recover and improve with proper treatment.

During the 2003 invasion of Iraq and War in Afghanistan (2001–2021), social workers worked in NATO hospitals in Afghanistan and Iraqi bases. They made visits to provide counseling services at forward operating bases. Twenty-two percent of the clients were diagnosed with posttraumatic stress disorder, 17 percent with depression, and 7 percent with alcohol use disorder. In 2009, there was a high level of suicides among active-duty soldiers: 160 confirmed or suspected Army suicides. In 2008, the Marine Corps had a record 52 suicides. The stress of long and repeated deployments to war zones, the dangerous and confusing nature of both wars, wavering public support for the wars, and reduced troop morale all contributed to escalating mental health issues. Military and civilian social workers served a critical role in the veterans' health care system.

Mental health services are a loose network of services ranging from highly structured inpatient psychiatric units to informal support groups, where psychiatric social workers engage in the diverse approaches in multiple settings along with other disciplines andparaprofessional workers.

Along with specializing in the delivery of mental health services, social workers also work in settings such as hospitals, schools, veterinary clinics, pediatricians' offices, neighborhood family support centers, and courts. When paired with specialized training in child welfare research suggests a social work education can improve knowledge and preparation.

=== Canada ===
A role for psychiatric social workers was established early in Canada's history of service delivery in the field of population health. Native North Americans understood mental trouble as an indication of an individual who had lost their equilibrium with the sense of place and belonging in general, and with the rest of the group in particular. In native healing beliefs, health and mental health were inseparable, so similar combinations of natural and spiritual remedies were often employed to relieve both mental and physical illness. These communities and families greatly valued holistic approaches for preventive health care. Indigenous peoples in Canada have faced cultural oppression and social marginalization through the actions of European colonizers and their institutions since the earliest periods of contact. Culture contact brought with it many forms of depredation. Economic, political, and religious institutions of the European settlers all contributed to the displacement and oppression of indigenous people.

The first officially recorded treatment practices were in 1714, when Quebec opened wards for the mentally ill. In the 1830s social services were active through charity organizations and church parishes (Social Gospel Movement). Asylums for the insane were opened in 1835 in Saint John and New Brunswick. In 1841 in Toronto care for the mentally ill became institutionally based. Canada became a self-governing dominion in 1867, retaining its ties to the British crown. During this period, age of industrial capitalism began and it led to social and economic dislocation in many forms. By 1887 asylums were converted to hospitals, and nurses and attendants were employed for the care of the mentally ill. Social work training began at the University of Toronto in 1914. Before that, social workers acquired their training through trial and error methods on the job and by participating in apprenticeship plans offered by charity organization societies. These plans included related study, practical experience, and supervision. In 1918 Dr. Clarence Hincks and Clifford Beers founded the Canadian National Committee for Mental Hygiene, which later became the Canadian Mental Health Association. In the 1930s Hincks promoted prevention and of treating sufferers of mental illness before they were incapacitated (early intervention).

World War II profoundly affected attitudes towards mental health. The medical examinations of recruits revealed that thousands of apparently healthy adults suffered mental difficulties. This knowledge changed public attitudes towards mental health, and stimulated research into preventive measures and methods of treatment. In 1951 Mental Health Week was introduced across Canada. For the first half of the twentieth century, with a period of deinstitutionalisation beginning in the late 1960s psychiatric social work succeeded to the current emphasis on community-based care, psychiatric social work focused beyond the medical model's aspects on individual diagnosis to identify and address social inequities and structural issues. In the 1980s Mental Health Act was amended to give consumers the right to choose treatment alternatives. Later the focus shifted to workforce mental health issues and environmental root causes.

In Ontario, the regulator, the Ontario College of Social Workers and Social Service Workers (OCSWSSW) regulates two professions: registered social workers (RSW) and registered social service workers (RSSW). Each province has similar regulatory bodies, and their leanings and interpretations are influenced by the Canadian Council of Social Work Regulators (CCSWR). The Canadian Association of Social Workers (CASW) is the national professional body for social workers. Prior to the provincial-level politicization that began in the early 2000s and lasted until the mid-2010s, registrants of this professional body were able to engage in interprovincial practice as registered social workers.

=== France ===
The social worker (in France) or social assistant (in Belgium and Switzerland) helps individuals, families or groups in difficulty in order to promote their well-being, social integration and autonomy.

The professional standards are set out in Annex I of the decree of 22 August 2018, which specifies that the social work assistant is a social work professional. They work within the framework of a mandate and institutional missions. They carry out social interventions, individual or collective, with a view to improving the living conditions of individuals and families through a comprehensive approach and social support. Social work assistants and students preparing for the practice of this profession are bound by professional secrecy under the conditions and subject to the reservations set out in Articles 226-13 and 226-14 of the Penal Code and Article L.411-3 of the Social Action and Families Code.

=== India ===
The earliest citing of mental disorders in India are from Vedic Era (2000 BC – AD 600). Charaka Samhita, an ayurvedic textbook believed to be from 400 to 200 BC describes various factors of mental stability. It also has instructions regarding how to set up a care delivery system. In the same era, Siddha was a medical system in south India. The great sage Agastya was one of the 18 siddhas contributing to a system of medicine. This system has included the Agastiyar Kirigai Nool, a compendium of psychiatric disorders and their recommended treatments. In Atharva Veda too there are descriptions and resolutions about mental health afflictions. In the Mughal period Unani system of medicine was introduced by an Indian physician Unhammad in 1222. The existing form of psychotherapy was known then as ilaj-i-nafsani in Unani medicine.

The 18th century was a very unstable period in Indian history, which contributed to psychological and social chaos in the Indian subcontinent. In 1745, lunatic asylums were developed in Bombay (Mumbai) followed by Calcutta (Kolkata) in 1784, and Madras (Chennai) in 1794. The need to establish hospitals became more acute, first to treat and manage Englishmen and Indian 'sepoys' (military men) employed by the British East India Company. The First Lunacy Act (also called Act No. 36) that came into effect in 1858 was later modified by a committee appointed in Bengal in 1888. Later, the Indian Lunacy Act, 1912 was brought under this legislation. A rehabilitation programme was initiated between 1870s and 1890s for persons with mental illness at the Mysore Lunatic Asylum, and then an occupational therapy department was established during this period in almost each of the lunatic asylums. The programme in the asylum was called 'work therapy'. In this programme, persons with mental illness were involved in the field of agriculture for all activities. This programme is considered as the seed of origin of psychosocial rehabilitation in India.

Berkeley-Hill, superintendent of the European Hospital (now known as the Central Institute of Psychiatry (CIP), established in 1918), was deeply concerned about the improvement of mental hospitals in those days. The sustained efforts of Berkeley-Hill helped to raise the standard of treatment and care and he also persuaded the government to change the term 'asylum' to 'hospital' in 1920. Techniques similar to the current token-economy were first started in 1920 and called by the name 'habit formation chart' at the CIP, Ranchi. In 1937, the first post of psychiatric social worker was created in the child guidance clinic run by the Dhorabji Tata School of Social Work (established in 1936). It is considered as the first documented evidence of social work practice in Indian mental health field.

After Independence in 1947, general hospital psychiatry units (GHPUs) were established to improve conditions in existing hospitals, while at the same time encouraging outpatient care through these units. In Amritsar Dr. Vidyasagar instituted active involvement of families in the care of persons with mental illness. This was advanced practice ahead of its times regarding treatment and care. This methodology had a greater impact on social work practice in the mental health field especially in reducing the stigmatisation. In 1948 Gauri Rani Banerjee, trained in the United States, started a master's course in medical and psychiatric social work at the Dhorabji Tata School of Social Work (now TISS). Later the first trained psychiatric social worker was appointed in 1949 at the adult psychiatry unit of Yerwada Mental Hospital, Pune.

In various parts of the country, in mental health service settings, social workers were employed—in 1956 at a mental hospital in Amritsar, in 1958 at a child guidance clinic of the college of nursing, and in Delhi in 1960 at the All India Institute of Medical Sciences and in 1962 at the Ram Manohar Lohia Hospital. In 1960, the Madras Mental Hospital (now Institute of Mental Health) employed social workers to bridge the gap between doctors and patients. In 1961 the social work post was created at the NIMHANS. In these settings they took care of the psychosocial aspect of treatment. This system enabled social service practices to have a stronger long-term impact on mental health care.

In 1966 by the recommendation Mental Health Advisory Committee, Ministry of Health, Government of India, NIMHANS commenced Department of Psychiatric Social Work started and a two-year Postgraduate Diploma in Psychiatric Social Work was introduced in 1968. In 1978, the nomenclature of the course was changed to MPhil in Psychiatric Social Work. Subsequently, a PhD Programme was introduced. By the recommendations Mudaliar committee in 1962, Diploma in Psychiatric Social Work was started in 1970 at the European Mental Hospital at Ranchi (now CIP). The program was upgraded and other higher training courses were added subsequently.

A new initiative to integrate mental health with general health services started in 1975 in India. The Ministry of Health, Government of India formulated the National Mental Health Programme (NMHP) and launched it in 1982. The same was reviewed in 1995 and based on that, the District Mental Health Program (DMHP) was launched in 1996 which sought to integrate mental health care with public health care. This model has been implemented in all the states and currently there are 125 DMHP sites in India.

National Human Rights Commission (NHRC) in 1998 and 2008 carried out systematic, intensive and critical examinations of mental hospitals in India. This resulted in recognition of the human rights of the persons with mental illness by the NHRC. From the NHRC's report as part of the NMHP, funds were provided for upgrading the facilities of mental hospitals. As a result of the study, it was revealed that there were more positive changes in the decade until the joint report of NHRC and NIMHANS in 2008 compared to the last 50 years until 1998. In 2016 Mental Health Care Bill was passed which ensures and legally entitles access to treatments with coverage from insurance, safeguarding dignity of the afflicted person, improving legal and healthcare access and allows for free medications. In December 2016, Disabilities Act 1995 was repealed with Rights of Persons with Disabilities Act (RPWD), 2016 from the 2014 Bill which ensures benefits for a wider population with disabilities. The Bill before becoming an Act was pushed for amendments by stakeholders mainly against alarming clauses in the "Equality and Non discrimination" section that diminishes the power of the act and allows establishments to overlook or discriminate against persons with disabilities and against the general lack of directives that requires to ensure the proper implementation of the Act.

Mental health in India is in its developing stages. There are not enough professionals to support the demand. According to the Indian Psychiatric Society, there are around 9000 psychiatrists only in the country as of January 2019. Going by this figure, India has 0.75 psychiatrists per 100,000 population, while the desirable number is at least 3 psychiatrists per 100,000. While the number of psychiatrists has increased since 2010, it is still far from a healthy ratio.

Lack of any universally accepted single licensing authority compared to foreign countries puts social workers at general in risk. But general bodies/councils accepts automatically a university-qualified social worker as a professional licensed to practice or as a qualified clinician. Lack of a centralized council in tie-up with Schools of Social Work also makes a decline in promotion for the scope of social workers as mental health professionals. Though in this midst the service of social workers has given a facelift to the mental health sector in the country with other allied professionals.

=== Iran ===
State welfare organization was previously part of health and social security ministry.

== Theoretical models and practices ==
Social work is an interdisciplinary profession, meaning it draws from a number of areas, such as (but not limited to) psychology, sociology, politics, criminology, economics, ecology, education, health, law, philosophy, anthropology, and counseling, including psychotherapy. Field work is a distinctive attribution to social work pedagogy. This equips the trainee in understanding the theories and models within the field of work. Professional practitioners from multicultural aspects have their roots in this social work immersion engagements from the early 19th century in the western countries. Social work theories help explain the root causes of problems and identify the most effective intervention methods. Key perspectives include:

=== Systems theory ===
Systems theory views people as products of complex systems (family, community, social environment) rather than as isolated individuals. In social work, the use of systems theory enables professionals to view the situation and environmental factors of their clients holistically, thereby better understanding the reasons behind their challenges, difficulties, and choices.

=== Complexity theory ===
Complexity theory focuses on unpredictable, emergent patterns in these vast, dynamic systems (like societal issues), offering tools to navigate messy realities beyond simple cause-and-effect, crucial for tackling complex social problems like poverty or mental health crises through adaptive, vision-based approaches rather than rigid plans.

=== Psychodynamic theory ===
Psychodynamic theory focuses on the psychological drives and forces within individuals, explores how unconscious drives, childhood experiences, and internal conflicts (e.g. between instinctual drives or id, rational decision-making or ego, and internalized morals or superego) shape personality and behavior, stemming from Sigmund Freud's psychoanalysis, emphasizing that unresolved early traumas manifest in later life.

=== Cognitive theory ===
Cognitive theory uncovers how a person's thinking influences behavior. It focuses on how individuals perceive, process, and interpret information, emphasizing the role of thoughts and beliefs in shaping behavior and emotions.

=== Social learning theory ===
Social learning theory introduced by psychologist Albert Bandura, posits that people learn new behaviors, attitudes, and emotional responses by observing, imitating, and emulating others—especially when these behaviors are reinforced. This theory blends behaviorism and cognitive learning theory, emphasizing that learning is not merely the result of direct experience or conditioned reflexes, but also involves intrinsic psychological processes such as attention, memory, and motivation.

=== Rational choice theory and Social exchange theory ===
Rational choice theory views service recipients as rational actors who weigh costs and benefits to maximize positive outcomes. This theory helps social workers understand service recipient motivations, develop empowering interventions, and evaluate decisions by analyzing perceived risks/rewards.

Social exchange theory applies the logic of rational choice theory specifically to social interactions, viewing relationships as exchanges where people seek profitable, i.e. reward greater than cost.

Both theories have been criticized for oversimplifying human behavior and downplaying emotions, altruism, or irrationality, but it has been argued that they provide valuable frameworks for understanding decision-making.

=== The developmental perspective ===
The developmental perspective views people as capable of growth, focusing on strengths, potential, and building self-reliance, rather than just fixing problems. Erik Erikson's psychosocial theory is a highly influential framework that, building on Sigmund Freud's theory of psychosexual development, emphasizes the role of social interaction and culture throughout the life cycle. Erikson described eight stages, each with a major psychosocial task to accomplish or crisis to overcome:

- Trust vs. Mistrust (Infancy)
- Autonomy vs. Shame and Doubt (Toddlerhood)
- Initiative vs. Guilt (Preschool years)
- Industry vs. Inferiority (School age)
- Identity vs. Role Confusion (Adolescence)
- Intimacy vs. Isolation (Young adulthood)
- Generativity vs. Stagnation (Middle adulthood)
- Ego Integrity vs. Despair (Late adulthood)

=== Conflict theory ===
Conflict theory, influenced by Karl Marx, explains how oppression, discrimination, power structures, power struggles and social inequalities impact people's lives and contribute to social problems. Social workers applying this theory may focus on initiatives, social justice, and structural change to address poverty, discrimination, and oppression.

=== Others ===
As an example, here are some of the models and theories used within social work practice:

- Empathy
- Social case work
- Social group work
- Community organization
- Behavioral
- School social worker
- Leadership and management
- Crisis intervention
- Suicide prevention
- Mental health
- Addiction
- Cognitive-behavioral
- Critical
- Social insurance
- Ecological
- Equity theory
- Financial social work
- Forensic social work
- Macro social work
- Motivational interviewing
- Medical social work
- Medical terminology
- Person-centered therapy
- Psychoanalytic
- Psychodynamic
- Existential
- Humanistic
- Social work management
- Sociotherapy
- Brief psychotherapy or solution-focused approach
- Recovery approach
- Reflexivity
- Social exchange
- Welfare economics
- Anti-oppressive practice
- Psychosocial rehabilitation
- Cognitive behavioral therapy
- Dialectical behavior therapy
- Systems theory
- Policy Analysis
- Strength-based practice
- Task-centered
- Family therapy
- Advocacy
- Prevention science
- Project management
- Program evaluation and performance measurement
- Systems thinking
- Community development and intervention
- Positive psychology
- Social actions
- Animal-assisted therapy

== Profession ==
American educator Abraham Flexner in a 1915 lecture, "Is Social Work a Profession?", delivered at the National Conference on Charities and Corrections, examined the characteristics of a profession concerning social work. It is not a 'single model', such as that of health, followed by medical professions such as nurses and doctors, but an integrated profession, and the likeness with medical profession is that social work requires a continued study for professional development to retain knowledge and skills that are evidence-based by practice standards. A social work professional's services lead toward the aim of providing beneficial services to individuals, dyads, families, groups, organizations, and communities to achieve optimum psychosocial functioning.

Its eight core functions present in its methods of practice are described by Popple and Leighninger as:

1. Engagement — social worker must first engage the client in early meetings to promote a collaborative relationship
2. Assessment — data gathered must be specifically aimed at guiding and directing a plan of action to help the client
3. Planning — negotiate and formulate an action plan
4. Implementation — promote resource acquisition and enhance role performance
5. Monitoring/Evaluation — ongoing documentation for assessing the extent to which the client is following through on short-term goal attainment
6. Supportive Counseling — affirming, challenging, encouraging, informing, and exploring options
7. Graduated Disengagement — seeking to replace the social worker with a naturally occurring resource
8. Administration — planning and managing social work programs, providing operations management support, and administrating case management services

There are six broad ethical principles in National Association of Social Workers' (NASW) Code of Ethics that inform social work practice, they are both prescriptive and proscriptive, and are based on six core values:

1. Service — help people in need and provide pro bono services
2. Social Justice — engage in social change activities for and with people to promote social justice and challenge social injustice
3. Dignity and worth of the person — treat people with care and respect, be sensitive to cultural and ethnic diversity, and promote individuals socially responsible self determination
4. Importance of human relationships — maintain positive client relationships because they play a vital role in driving change, and engage with people as partners who empower them through the helping process
5. Integrity — engage clients with honesty and responsibility to build trust, and you are not only responsible for your own professional ethics and integrity but also of the service organization
6. Competence — practice and build expertise as a social worker, and continually seek to enhance and contribute professional knowledge and skills

The International Federation of Social Workers also outlines essential principles for guiding social workers towards high professional standards. These include recognizing the inherent dignity of all people, upholding human rights, striving for social justice, supporting self-determination, encouraging participation, respecting privacy and confidentiality, treating individuals holistically, using technology and social media responsibly, and maintaining professional integrity.

A historic and defining feature of social work is the profession's focus on individual well-being in a social context and the well-being of society. Social workers promote social justice and social change with and on behalf of clients. A "client" can be an individual, family, group, organization, or community. In the broadening scope of the modern social worker's role, some practitioners have in recent years traveled to war-torn countries to provide psychosocial assistance to families and survivors.

Newer areas of social work practice involve management science. The growth of "social work administration" (sometimes also referred to as "social work management") for transforming social policies into services and directing activities of an organization toward achievement of goals is a related field. Helping clients with accessing benefits such as unemployment insurance and disability benefits, to assist individuals and families in building savings and acquiring assets to improve their financial security over the long-term, to manage large operations, etc. requires social workers to know financial management skills to help clients and organization's to be financially self-sufficient. Financial social work also helps clients with low-income or low to middle-income, people who are either unbanked (do not have a banking account) or underbanked (individuals who have a bank account but tend to rely on high cost non-bank providers for their financial transactions), with better mediation with financial institutions and induction of money management skills. A prominent area in which social workers operate is Behavioral Social Work. They apply principles of learning and social learning to conduct behavioral analysis and behavior management. Empiricism and effectiveness serve as means to ensure the dignity of clients, and focusing on the present is what distinguishes behavioral social work from other types of social work practices. In a multicultural case, the behavior of multiple members from different cultures matters. In such cases, an ecobehavioral perspective is taken due to the external influences. The interpersonal skills that a social worker brings to the job make them stand out from behavioral therapists. Another area that social workers are focusing is risk management, risk in social work is taken as Knight in 1921 defined "If you don't even know for sure what will happen, but you know the odds, that is risk and If you don't even know the odds, that is uncertainty." Risk management in social work means minimizing the risks while increasing potential benefits for clients by analyzing the risks and benefits in the duty of care or decisions. Occupational social work is a field where the trained professionals assist a management with worker's welfare, in their psychosocial wellness, and helps management's policies and protocols to be humanistic and anti-oppressive.

In the United States, according to the Substance Abuse and Mental Health Services Administration (SAMHSA), a branch of the U.S. Department of Health and Human Services, professional social workers are the largest group of mental health services providers. There are more clinically trained social workers—over 200,000—than psychiatrists, psychologists, and psychiatric nurses combined. Federal law and the National Institutes of Health recognize social work as one of five core mental health professions.

Examples of fields a social worker may be employed in are poverty relief, life skills education, community organizing, community organization, community development, rural development, forensics and corrections, legislation, industrial relations, project management, child protection, elder protection, women's rights, human rights, systems optimization, finance, addictions rehabilitation, child development, cross-cultural mediation, occupational safety and health, disaster management, mental health, psychosocial therapy, disabilities, etc.

== Roles and functions ==
Social workers play many roles in mental health settings, including those of case manager, advocate, administrator, and therapist. The major functions of a psychiatric social worker are promotion and prevention, treatment, and rehabilitation. Social workers may also practice:

- Counseling and psychotherapy
- Case management and support services
- Crisis intervention
- Psychoeducation
- Psychiatric rehabilitation and recovery
- Care coordination and monitoring
- Program management/administration
- Program, policy and resource development
- Research and evaluation

Psychiatric social workers conduct psychosocial assessments of the patients and work to enhance patient and family communications with the medical team members and ensure the inter-professional cordiality in the team to secure patients with the best possible care and to be active partners in their care planning. Depending upon the requirement, social workers are often involved in illness education, counseling and psychotherapy. In all areas, they are pivotal to the aftercare process to facilitate a careful transition back to family and community.

== Mental health of social workers ==
Several studies have reported that social workers have an increased risk of common mental disorders, long-term sickness absence due to mental illnesses and antidepressant use. A study in Sweden has found that social workers have an increased risk of receiving a diagnosis of depression or anxiety and stress-related disorders in comparison with other workers. The risk for social workers is high even when comparing to other similar human-service professions, and social workers in psychiatric care or in assistance analysis are the most vulnerable.

There are multiple explanations for this increased risk. Individual components include secondary traumatic stress, compassion fatigue and selection of vulnerable employees into the profession. On an organizational level, high job strain, organizational culture and work overload are important factors.

There is a difference in gender. When comparing to their same-gender counterparts in other professions, men in social work have a higher risk than women. Male social workers, when compared to men in other professions, have a 70% increased risk of being diagnosed with depression or anxiety disorders. Female social workers have an increased risk of 20% when comparing to women in other professions. This might be due to the baseline prevalence of common mental disorders, which is high among women and lower among men in the general population. Another potential explanation is that men in gender-balanced workplaces tend to seek help from healthcare providers more often than men in male-dominated industries.

== Qualifications and license ==
The education of social workers begins with a bachelor's degree (BA, BSc, BSSW, BSW, etc.) or diploma in social work or a Bachelor of Social Services. Some countries offer postgraduate degrees in social work, such as a master's degree (MSW, MSSW, MSS, MSSA, MA, MSc, MRes, MPhil.) or doctoral studies (Ph.D. and DSW (Doctor of Social Work)).

Like other professionals, several countries and jurisdictions require registration or license for working as social workers, and there are mandated qualifications. In other places, the professional association sets academic requirements as the qualification for practicing the profession. However, certain types of workers are exempted from needing a registration license. The success of these professionals is based on the recognition of and by the employers that provide social work services. These employers don't require the title of a registered social worker as a necessity for providing social work and related services.

=== North America ===
In the United States, social work undergraduate and master's programs are accredited by the Council on Social Work Education. A CSWE-accredited degree is required for one to become a state-licensed social worker. The CSWE even accredits online master's in social work programs in traditional and advanced standing options. In 1898, the New York Charity Organization Society, which was the Columbia University School of Social Work's earliest entity, began offering formal "social philanthropy" courses, marking both the beginning date for social work education in the United States, as well as the launching of professional social work. However, a CSWE-accredited program doesn't necessarily have to meet ASWB licensing knowledge requirements, and many of them do not meet them.

The Association of Social Work Boards (ASWB) is a regulatory organization that provides licensing examination services to social work regulatory boards in the United States and Canada. Due to the limited scope of the organization's objectives, it is not a social work organization that is accountable to the broader social work community or to the ones certified by ASWB exams. ASWB generates a net income of $6,000,000 from license examination administration and $800,000 from publishing study materials. As such, it is an organization that is focused on revenue maximization, and by principle, it is only responsible and answerable to its board members. ASWB is a nonprofit and this is a historical estimate, not a verified current annual breakdown.

The objective of a social work license is to ensure the public's safety and quality of service. It is intended to ensure that social workers understand and can follow NASW's Code of Ethics in their occupational practices, ascertain social workers' knowledge in service provision, and protect the use of the Social Work title from misuse and unethical practices. However, a study found out that having a social work license is not related to improved service quality for consumers. They substituted paraprofessionals with qualified licensed social workers and found out that there was no improvement in overall facility quality, quality of life, or the provision of social services. The paraprofessionals with training were able to perform similarly to licensed social workers, just like any trained human resource in a workforce would perform a job for which they are trained. Social work graduates gain this knowledge and training through academic and financial investment in earning an accredited social work degree, degree equalization process, and from receiving professional supervision during and post-graduation.

For decades, the social work community has called on ASWB for transparency regarding the data on the validity and racial sensitivity of the exams. However, ASWB suppressed this information, leading many critics to assess that if the exams were free from flaws and bias, such data would have been released a long time ago. Unlike any other professional licensing board, in 2022 ASWB released the pass rate data, and a Change.org petition called "#StopASWB" highlighted with academic citations that the Association of Social Work Boards' exams are biased with feedback from white social workers. The petition also pointed out that the exams unfairly penalize social workers who practice in other languages, require privileged resources for success, and utilize oppressive standards in formatting the exams, which are inconsistent with social work values. The National Association of Social Workers (NASW) expressed opposition to the social work licensing exams conducted by the Association of Social Work Boards (ASWB). This came after analyzing ASWB data, which revealed considerable discrepancies in pass rates for aspiring social workers of diverse racial backgrounds, older individuals, and those who speak English as a second language (ESL). Pass rates of exams indicate that white test takers are more than twice as likely to pass on their first attempt compared to BIPOC test takers indicating high construct irrelevant variance among other issues. This finding raises questions about the reliability and credibility of social work licensure process through ASWB exams.

NASW's firm stance on the matter serves as a significant reckoning moment regarding the systemic racism in the social work profession, particularly within its regulatory system. It also highlights ASWB's silence about the licensure apparatus that perpetuates racial disparities, leading its association members to institutional betrayal. After the release of ASWB data showing race and age-related discrepancies in pass rates, the national accreditation body, the Council on Social Work Education (CSWE), removed the ASWB licensure exam pass rates as an option for social work education programs to meet accreditation requirements. Members from various communities in social work have expressed that discussions about addressing this systemic oppression should be guided by a formal acknowledgment of wrongdoing and a spirit of reconciliation and healing. The state of Illinois passed a landmark bill, HB2365 SA1, marking a significant step in reducing its regulatory body's dependency on ASWB. With this bill, Illinois has addressed the uneven power that ASWB held, which affected the qualification of educated social workers for practice entry. Now, educated social workers can obtain licensing by completing 3000 hours of professional supervision, eliminating the previous requirement of ASWB exam results for licensure, which often led to issues of unemployment and related emotional, behavioral, and physical health consequences.

Since the early 1990s, researchers have critiqued ASWB exams for their lack of content and criterion validity that undermines the test validity all together. In a study conducted in 2023, it was discovered that there are questions in ASWB exams that have rationales based on theories that are not evidence-based, and that have significant item validity issues. The researchers used generative AI application, ChatGPT to test ASWB rationales and found that the rationales provided by ChatGPT were of higher quality. They revealed that ChatGPT exhibited an excellent ability to recognize social work-related text patterns for scenario-based decision-making and offered high-quality rationales while taking into account the safety and ethics in social work practice, even without specific training for such a task. They suggested that it may be necessary and timely to move away from oppressive assessment formats used to evaluate social workers' competence and reconsider licensing exams with serious validity issues that disproportionately exclude individuals based on their race, age, and language. A proposed assessment format is one based on mastery learning, which would lead to competency-based licensing.

Due to the accumulated evidence of significant validity flaws in ASWB's tests, its conflict of interest, and other issues, many researchers have urged state legislators and regulators to discontinue the use of ASWB exams for licensure or temporarily suspend them until a novel, anti-oppressive, and validated alternative is established. In the interim, they suggest relying on traditional supervision methods to ensure the safe and ethical practice of social work. They elucidate that supervision not only guides licensure seekers but also allows well-equipped supervisors to assess individuals' capabilities to practice safely and ethically more accurately in contexts, which is a more valid approach to assessing such competence.

Other social workers, however, point out that supervision is only as strong as the person providing it and the extent to which it is standardized for the area of practice. Like the one-time ASWB licensing examination, which is disconnected from practice standards, supervision is not always a reliable criterion for entry into the profession. Using verified academic credentials and forgoing redundant licensure requirements more closely aligns with the question Flexner posed in 1915: "Is social work a profession?"

== Professional associations ==
Social workers have several professional associations that provide ethical guidance and other forms of support for their members and social work in general. These associations may be international, continental, semi-continental, national, or regional. The main international associations are the International Federation of Social Workers (IFSW) and the International Association of Schools of Social Work (IASSW).

The largest professional social work association in the United States is the National Association of Social Workers, they have instituted a code for professional conduct and a set of principles rooted in six core values: service, social justice, dignity and worth of the person, importance of human relationships, integrity, and competence. There also exist organizations that represent clinical social workers such as the American Association of Psychoanalysis in Clinical Social Work. AAPCSW is a national organization representing social workers who practice psychoanalytic social work and psychoanalysis. There are also several states with Clinical Social Work Societies which represent all social workers who conduct psychotherapy from a variety of theoretical frameworks with families, groups, and individuals. The Association for Community Organization and Social Administration (ACOSA) is a professional organization for social workers who practice within the community organizing, policy, and political spheres. The American Academy of Social Work and Social Welfare (AASWSW) is a national honorific society of scholars and practitioners who focus on social work and social welfare.

In the UK, the professional association is the British Association of Social Workers (BASW) with just over 18,000 members (as of August 2015), and the regulatory body for social workers is Social Work England. In Australia, the professional association is the Australian Association of Social Workers (AASW) that ensure social workers meet required standards for social work practice in Australia, founded in 1946 and have more than 10,000 members. Accredited social workers in Australia can also provide services under the Access to Allied Psychological Services (ATAPS) program. In New Zealand, the regulatory body for social workers is Kāhui Whakamana Tauwhiro (SWRB).

== Trade unions representing social workers ==
In the United Kingdom, just over half of social workers are employed by local authorities, and many of these are represented by UNISON, the public sector employee union. Smaller numbers are members of the Unite the Union and the GMB. The British Union of Social Work Employees (BUSWE) has been a section of the trade union Community since 2008.

While at that stage, not a union, the British Association of Social Workers operated a professional advice and representation service from the early 1990s. Social Work qualified staff who are also experienced in employment law and industrial relations provide the kind of representation you would expect from a trade union in the event of a grievance, discipline or conduct matters specifically in respect of professional conduct or practice. However, this service depended on the goodwill of employers to allow the representatives to be present at these meetings, as only trade unions have the legal right and entitlement of representation in the workplace.

By 2011 several councils had realized that they did not have to permit BASW access, and those that were challenged by the skilled professional representation of their staff were withdrawing permission. For this reason BASW once again took up trade union status by forming its arms-length trade union section, Social Workers Union (SWU). This gives the legal right to represent its members whether the employer or Trades Union Congress (TUC) recognizes SWU or not. In 2015 the TUC was still resisting SWU application for admission to congress membership and while most employers are not making formal statements of recognition until the TUC may change its policy, they are all legally required to permit SWU (BASW) representation at internal discipline hearings, etc.

== Use of information technology in social work ==
Information technology is vital in social work, it transforms the documentation part of the work into electronic media. This makes the process transparent, accessible and provides data for analytics. Observation is a tool used in social work for developing solutions. Anabel Quan-Haase in Technology and Society defines the term surveillance as "watching over" (Quan-Haase. 2016. P 213), she continues to explain that the observation of others socially and behaviorally is natural, but it becomes more like surveillance when the purpose of the observation is to keep guard over someone (Quan-Haase. 2016. P 213). Often, at the surface level, the use of surveillance and surveillance technologies within the social work profession is seemingly an unethical invasion of privacy. When engaging with the social work code of ethics a little more deeply, it becomes obvious that the line between ethical and unethical becomes blurred. Within the social work code of ethics, there are multiple mentions of the use of technology within social work practice. The one that seems the most applicable to surveillance or artificial intelligence is 5.02 article f, "When using electronic technology to facilitate evaluation or research" and it goes on to explain that clients should be informed when technology is being used within the practice (Workers. 2008. Article 5.02).

== Social workers in literature ==
In 2011, a critic stated that "novels about social work are rare", and as recently as 2004, another critic claimed to have difficulty finding novels featuring a main character holding a Master of Social Work degree.

However, social workers have been the subject of many novels, including:

- Bohjalian, Chris (2007). The double bind: a novel (1st ed.). New York: Shaye Areheart Books. ISBN 978-1-4000-4746-8.
- Cooper, Philip (2013). Social work man. Leicester: Matador. ISBN 978-1-78088-508-7.
- Barrington, Freya (2015). Known to Social Services (1st ed.). USA: FARAXA Publishing. ISBN 978-99957-828-7-0.
- Desai, Kishwar (2010). Witness the night. London: Beautiful Books. ISBN 978-1-905636-85-3.
- Irish, Lola (1993). Streets of dust: a novel based on the life of Caroline Chisholm. Kirribilli, N.S.W: Eldorado. ISBN 1-86412-001-0.
- Greenlee, Sam (1990) [1969]. The spook who sat by the door: a novel. African American life. Detroit: Wayne State University Press. ISBN 0-8143-2246-8.
- Konrád, György (1987). The case worker. Writers from the other Europe. New York, N.Y., U.S.A: Penguin Books. ISBN 0-14-009946-8.
- Henderson, Smith (2014). Fourth of July Creek: A Novel. HarperCollins. ISBN 978-0-06-228644-4.
- Johnson, Greg (2011). A very famous social worker. Bloomington, IN: iUniverse Inc. ISBN 978-1-4502-8548-3.
- Johnson, Kristin (2012). Unprotected: a novel. St. Butt, MN: North Star Press. ISBN 978-0-87839-589-7.
- Kalpakian, Laura (1992). Graced land (1st ed.). New York: Grove Weidenfeld. ISBN 0-8021-1474-1.
- Lewis, Sinclair (1933). Ann Vickers (First ed.). Garden City, N.Y.: Doubleday, Doran & Company. OCLC 288770.
- Mengestu, Dinaw (2014). All our names (First ed.). New York: Alfred A. Knopf. ISBN 978-0-385-34998-7.
- Sapphire (1996). Push: a novel (1st ed.). New York: Alfred A. Knopf; Random House. ISBN 0-679-44626-5. The basis of the movie Precious.
- Smith, Ali (2011) There But For The, Hamish Hamilton, Pantheon.
- Ungar, Michael (2011). The social worker: a novel. Lawrencetown, N.S: Pottersfield Press. ISBN 978-1-897426-26-5.
- Weinbren, Martin (2010). King Welfare. Bakewell: Peakpublish. ISBN 978-1-907219-18-4.

=== Fictional social workers in media ===
| Name | Portrayed by | Title | Year |
|---|---|---|---|
| Ann Vickers | Irene Dunne | Ann Vickers | 1933 |
| Ray Fremick | Edward Platt | Rebel Without a Cause | 1955 |
| Neil Brock | George C. Scott | East Side/West Side | 1963 |
| Edith Keeler | Joan Collins | Star Trek: The Original Series – "The City on the Edge of Forever" | 1967 |
| Germain Cazeneuve | Jean Gabin | Two Men in Town | 1973 |
| Ann Gentry | Anjanette Comer | The Baby | 1973 |
| Wendy Beamish | Mare Winningham | St. Elmo's Fire | 1985 |
| Willie Tanner | Max Wright | ALF | 1986 –1990 |
| Scott Barnes | John Travolta | Chains of Gold | 1990 |
| Donna Evans | Susan Barnes | In the Best Interest of the Children | 1992 |
| Dwight Mercer | Mykelti Williamson | Free Willy | 1993 |
| Mrs. Sellner | Anne Haney | Mrs. Doubtfire | 1993 |
| Margaret Lewin | Jessica Lange | Losing Isaiah | 1995 |
| Mary Bell | Angelina Jolie | Pushing Tin | 1999 |
| Arthur Brooks | Josh Mostel | Big Daddy | 1999 |
| Dr. Sonia Wick | Vanessa Redgrave | Girl, Interrupted | 1999 |
| Maxine Gray | Tyne Daly | Judging Amy | 1999 –2005 |
| Raquel | Leonor Watling | Raquel busca su sitio | 2000 |
| Cobra Bubbles | Ving Rhames | Lilo & Stitch | 2002 |
| Clare Barker | Sally Phillips | Clare in the Community | 2004 |
| Toby Flenderson | Paul Lieberstein | The Office | 2005 |
| Pankaj | Pankaj Kumar Singh | Smile Pinki | 2008 |
| Emily Jenkins | Renée Zellweger | Case 39 | 2009 |
| Bernie Wilkins | Don Cheadle | Hotel for Dogs | 2009 |
| Ms. Weiss | Mariah Carey | Precious | 2009 |
| Mark Lilly | Matt Oberg (Voice) | Ugly Americans (TV series) | 2010 –2012 |
| Meera | Bhama | Janapriyan | 2011 |
| Sam Healy | Michael Harney | Orange Is the New Black | 2013 |
| Emma Molinari | Martina Gusmán | El marginal | 2016 – 2022 |
| David Mailer | Patrick Gilmore | Travelers | 2016 |
| Emma B. Glover | Andi Osho | Lights Out; Shazam! | 2016; 2019 |
| Karen | Octavia Spencer | Instant Family | 2018 |
| Lucy Chambers | Jessica Raine | The Devil's Hour | 2022 |
| Eddie Garrick | Ludacris | Dashing Through the Snow | 2023 |
| Mrs. Kekoa | Tia Carrere | Lilo & Stitch | 2025 |
| Kiara Alfaro | Krystel V. McNeil | The Pitt | 2025 |

== See also ==
- Addiction medicine
- Approved mental health professional
- Clinical social work
- Child welfare
- Community development
- Critical social work
- Community practice
- Development studies
- Disaster social work
- Education in social work
- Forensic social work
- Gerontology
- Humanistic social work
- Human resource management
- Human services
- Integrated social work
- International Social Work
- Jocelyn Hyslop
- List of social work schools
- Mental health professional
- Macro social work
- Recreational therapy
- Right to an adequate standard of living
- Social development
- Social planning
- Social policy
- Social psychology
- Social research
- Social Scientist
- Social work with groups
- Urban development
- Welfare
