= Enid Warren =

British medical social worker

- Born: 22 May 1903; Finchley, England
- Died: 17 September 1980 (aged 77); Royal Free Hospital, London, England

Enid Charis Warren OBE (22 May 1903 – 17 September 1980) was a British medical social worker.

== Life ==
Warren was born in Finchley in 1903. Her parents were Walter Richard Warren (a barrister) and his wife, Annie (born Dixon). She was one of five daughters. When she was a child the family from Finchley to Highgate in London She attended the North London Collegiate School, like all of her sisters. Her eldest sister, Marjory Warren, became a doctor of geriatrics, and another a teacher. Warren decided on almoning because she wanted to help people.

In 1942, she became the head almoner at Hammersmith Hospital in London.

In 1961, she became the chair of the Institute of Almoners. During her time the institute became the Institute of Medical Social Workers. In 1966 she stood down from the position and she was awarded an OBE.

In 1962, the "Standing Conference of Organisations of Social Workers" (SCOSW), was created to bring together different branches of the social work profession and this resulted in 1970 in the founding of the British Association of Social Workers; Warren was chosen as the first chair. It was an amalgamation of the Association of Child Care Officers, the Association of Family Case Workers, the Association of Psychiatric Social Workers, the Association of Social Workers, the Institute of Medical Social Workers, the Moral Welfare Workers' Association, and the Society of Mental Welfare Officers.

Warren died at the Royal Free Hospital in 1980 of cancer and hypernephroma of the kidney. She was interviewed about her life by Alan Cohen and these were published much later. In 1982 her colleagues published "Portrait of a Social Worker" to record her life and leadership.
