= Institute of Medical Social Workers =

UK professional body

- Abbreviation: IMSW
- Formation: 1945
- Dissolved: 1970; 56 years ago
- Purpose: Professional body for social workers attached to hospitals
- Region served: United Kingdom
- General Secretary: Ann Davidson Kelly
- Formerly called: Almoners' Committee

The Institute of Medical Social Workers (IMSW) was the main professional body for medical social workers in the United Kingdom. It was formed from several "Almoners" organisations and took this name from 1964 until 1970. Ann Davidson Kelly was its first and only General Secretary.

== History ==
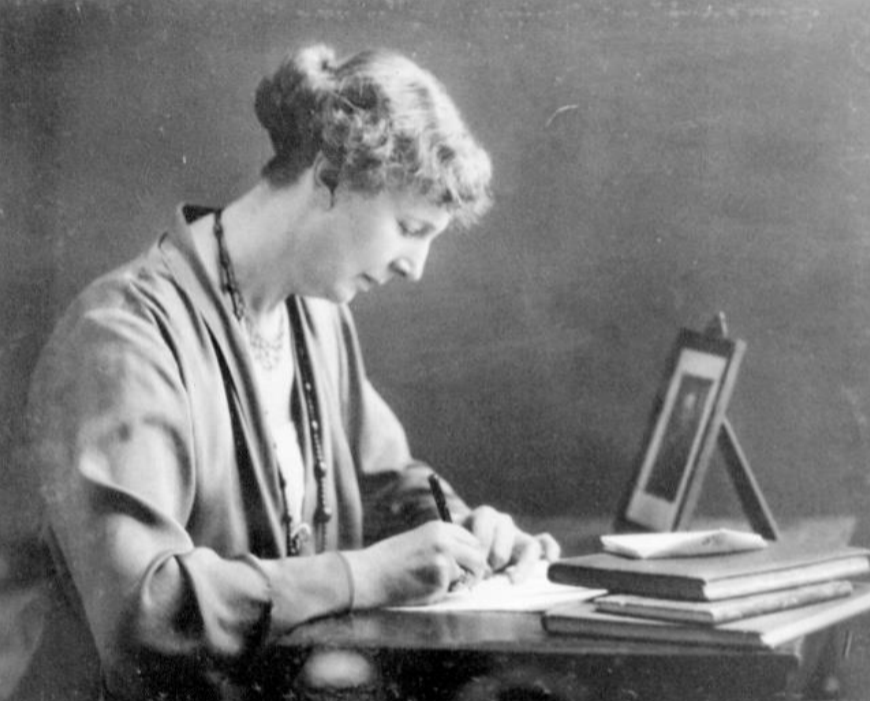
Anne Cummins, hospital almoner

It was established from two separate associations of hospital almoners. The Almoners' Committee was established in 1903 and successively changed its name to the Hospital Almoners' Committee in 1911, the Association of Hospital Almoners in 1920, and the Hospital Almoners' Association in 1927. The Hospital Almoners' Council was established in 1907 to handle the selection, training and employment of almoners and changed its name to the Institute of Hospital Almoners in 1922. The two amalgamated as the Institute of Almoners in 1945 with Marjorie Steel as its General Secretary. The institute changed its name to the Institute of Medical Social Workers in 1964. Ann Davidson Kelly was the new organisation's first General Secretary. Professor Sir Alan Moncrieff was the President until he retired in 1968 when Enid Warren who was a social worker took over as President.

In 1970 the association merged with six other social workers' organisations to form the British Association of Social Workers, having been a member of the Standing Conference of Organisations of Social Workers since 1962. Enid Warren was the President of the new organisation.
