= Joan Baraclough =

British social worker (1934–2024)

Joan Baraclough (19 January 1934 - 24 December 2024) was a British social worker and a founding member of the British Association of Social Workers and the Social Work History Network.

== Early life ==
Baraclough was born in Edinburgh on the 19 January 1934. After leaving school Baraclough moved to Ireland where she worked as a receptionist for a GP.

Baraclough later moved to Birmingham where she worked as an almoner's clerk at the eye hospital. Baraclough was encouraged by the almoner to train to become a social worker. Baraclough studied at the University of Edinburgh and undertook placements at the Edinburgh Royal, the Western General Hospital, and St Mary's Hospital in Paddington, London. Baraclough graduated in 1960.

== Professional Life ==
After graduating from the University of Edinburgh, Baraclough began working at King Edward's Hospital in Ealing, London. Baraclough went on to work at Westminster Hospital, where she eventual served as Deputy Head of department.

Between 1968 and 1969, Baraclough was seconded to the Tavistock Clinic, where she was supervised by John Bowlby.

In 1971, Baraclough became the first Secretary of Social Workers Benevolent Trust. In the same year, she was appointed Assistant General Secretary of the British Association of Social Workers, a role she held until 1977.

Between 1977 and 1984, Baraclough worked at the Central Council for Education and Training in Social Work and was involved in developing social work courses.

Between 1984 and 1994, Baraclough served as Assistant Chief Inspector of the Social Services Inspectorate, a precursor of the Care Quality Commission.

In 2000, Baraclough co-founded the Social Work History Network at King's College London.

== Personal life ==
After retiring, Baraclough completed a Master's in the History of Social Medicine at the University of Warwick and helped develop the archives of British Association of Social Worker's predecessor organisations.

Between 2007 and 2011, Baraclough chaired the Lemsford Local History Group and helped to build up the group's archive.

Baraclough died on the 24 December 2024.
