= University of North Carolina School of Social Work =

Coordinates: 35°54′25.32″N 79°3′15.33″W

UNC School of Social Work
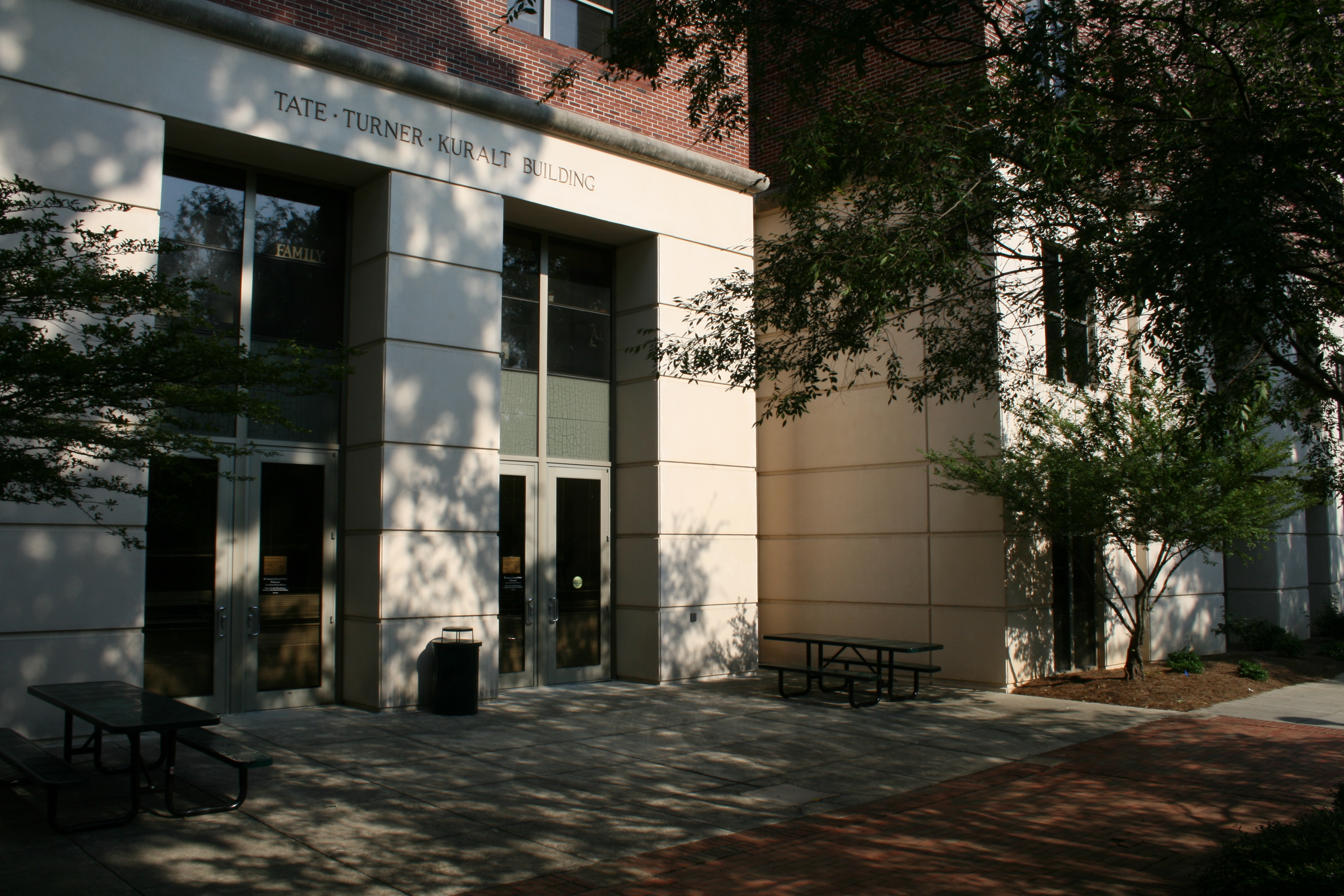
- Tate-Turner-Kuralt Building for the School of Social Work. Located at 325 Pittsboro Street, Chapel Hill, NC.
- Established: 1920
- Parent institution: University of North Carolina, Chapel Hill
- Dean: Ramona Denby-Brinson
- Students: 560
- Location: Tate-Turner-Kuralt Building, 325 Pittsboro St., Chapel Hill, North Carolina, United States
- Campus: Suburban
- Website: ssw.unc.edu

The University of North Carolina School of Social Work is the graduate school of social work at the University of North Carolina at Chapel Hill (UNC). Founded in 1920, the UNC School of Social Work was the first specialized professional school in North Carolina to offer professional education in public welfare and is one of the oldest professional schools at UNC. The School is fully accredited by the Council of Social Work Education (CSWE), allowing graduates to pursue clinical social work licensure and practice.

The UNC School of Social Work is consistently regarded as one of the top-ranked professional schools of social work in the United States. As of 2026, the School offers Master of Social Work (MSW) and Ph.D. degrees; a Bachelor of Social Work (BSW) program will be launched in the Fall of 2027.

== History ==
In 1919, the State legislature passed a law that required every county to organize for public welfare services and to employ a superintendent of public welfare. Just one year later, in September 1920, the University of North Carolina at Chapel Hill established the School of Public Welfare, which was the forerunner of the present School. Its mission was to offer instruction in social problems, to prepare students for social work practice and for community leadership, to provide service to North Carolina, and to carry on research and publish findings.

In 1932, the School of Public Welfare was expanded into the School of Public Administration, with the Division of Public Welfare and Social Work as one of its components. Later, the Division was known as the Division of Public Welfare and Social Work of the Graduate School. In 1950, by action of the Board of Trustees of the University, the Division became known as the School of Social Work. At this time, the School affiliated with the American Association of Schools of Social Work and the National Association of Schools of Social Administration. In 1952, when these organizations were merged into the Council on Social Work Education (CSWE), the School became an accredited member.

Following research and feasibility studies which demonstrated behavioral health workforce shortages in North Carolina and nationwide, the UNC School of Social Work has grown student capacity and enrollment by nearly 95% since 2022. Expansion of on-campus, online, and part-time program pathways intend to draw nontraditional students or those who intend to serve rural and underserved communities.

== Research institutes, centers, and labs ==
The UNC School of Social Work conducts research across several key areas, including child, youth, and family well-being; economic security; health, mental health, and behavioral health; older adults and long-term care; and system and service-level research. These include:

- Behavioral Health Springboard provides workforce development and technical assistance grounded in evidence-based education, research and programming designed to improve behavioral health outcomes for North Carolinians.
- CEAL@UNC (formerly the Center for Excellence in Assisted Living) was established in 2003 as a result of the U.S. Senate Special Committee on Aging’s Assisted Living (AL) Workgroup Report. CEAL@UNC conducts interdisciplinary projects in research, practice, policy, and consumer domains to advance wellbeing among assisted living residents and the AL workforce.
- Healthy Family Research Lab: conducts research focused on strengthening families to improve well-being outcomes for adolescents and their parents. Focus areas of research include parenting influences and strategies, youth substance use and other high-risk behavior, and family stressors and their implications.
- INSPIRED Lab: conducts interdisciplinary inquiry on the mechanisms contributing to health disparity, with a focus on the epidemiology and etiology of substance use among adolescents and young adults of color. The lab's research trains researchers and develops interventions to improve population health and promote health equity.
- The Jordan Institute for Families (JIF) was founded in 1996 through a donation by UNC alum and former professional basketball player Michael Jordan and his family. The JIF conducts interdisciplinary research around family stability through the life course, including supporting maternal health, caregiving, home visiting, mental health, economic support and social work leadership.
- The Deloris P. Jordan Global Social Development Innovations Center (GSDI) was originally launched in Fall 2017 with a focus on addressing systemic causes of poverty in youth around the globe. In October 2026, Michael Jordan donated $10 million to the School of Social Work, the largest donation in its history. The gift will fund the renovation and expansion of the GSDI, now named the Deloris P. Jordan Global Social Development Innovations Center in honor of Jordan's mother. Remaining funds will support the Jordan Institute for Families and establish the Jordan Family Scholars program for MSW students.
- Living F.R.E.E. Lab (Research Focused on Reducing Excessive Eating): a research group focused on developing and evaluating interventions around the intersection of disordered eating and chronic disease
- The Wellbeing and Illness in the Social Environment Lab (WISE) conducts interdisciplinary research around social drivers of health, access and affordability, psychosocial oncology, and patient and caregiver outcomes.

== Rankings and reputation ==
In 2024, U.S. News & World Report ranked the School of Social Work 4th out of 319 programs nationwide. In December 2025, the School was ranked as the top public university program for social work research, and third overall in research productivity by the Higher Education Research and Development (HERD) survey administered through the National Center for Science and Engineering Statistics.

== Notable faculty and alumni ==
- MaryAnn Black, MSW '70; clinical social worker; former member of the Durham County Board of Commissioners and the North Carolina House of Representatives
- Susan Davis (politician), MSW '68; former member of the United States House of Representatives for California
- Howard Nathaniel Lee, MSW '66; former mayor of Chapel Hill, NC; first African American to be elected mayor of any majority-white city in the South; first African American to hold a state cabinet post in North Carolina
- Hortense McClinton, retired professor of social work; first Black faculty member at UNC Chapel Hill
- Howard W. Odum, sociologist; founder of the UNC School of Public Welfare (which later became the School of Social Work)
- William L. Pollard, MSW '69; higher education administrator; former president of Medgar Evers College and the University of the District of Columbia; former Dean of Syracuse University School of Social Work

== See also ==
List of social work schools
