= Children's Homes Association =

The Children's Homes Association is a British trade association based in Sutton Coldfield. Formerly the Independent Children's Homes Association, it had 272 member organisations in 2022. Local authorities with their own children's homes can join as affiliate members.

In July 2014 it published a report following reports that young people living in privately run homes in Rochdale had been sexually exploited. It called for a professional body for residential child care, and a professional qualification and registration of staff. The British Association of Social Workers said children's homes have carried the "burden" of being seen as the last resort. The report also called for "greater central investment into training, research and development, underpinned by governmental support to develop the sector rather than constant criticism, suspicion and publicity.

In 2022 the association complained that children in care were seen as criminals rather than victims. They said local residents objected to planning applications because they think their house prices will go down if they have a children's home in the area.

In March 2022 the Competition and Markets Authority produced a report on the sector. They found that large private sector providers of fostering services and children's homes appeared to be making higher profits in England and Wales than would be expected in a well-functioning market. They were concerned about the financial stability of some children's homes being financed through private equity firms with high levels of debt. The association responded that the high costs highlighted were outliers which do not reflect those in the sector generally.
