= Doctor of Social Work =

Professional doctorate

The Doctor of Social Work (DSW) is a professional doctorate in social work, it is the highest academic award available in the field of social work, and most offer advanced training in a professional area of practice including but not limited to; nonprofit organization, leadership development, and social justice. The DSW is distinct from the more traditional PhD, which is a more research-oriented degree for social workers who wish primarily to further their careers in academia or research settings. Although different schools vary in the extent to which they emphasize each, both DSW and PhD candidates in the field of social work gain experience in education, advanced practice, teaching, supervision, research, policy analysis, administration and/or program development.

Individuals who hold the Doctor of Social Work work in a variety of fields and disciplines that coincide with that of social work including social services, educational leadership, health care administration and nonprofit organizations.

== History of the DSW degree ==
Although the first doctoral degrees that were offered in the field of social work were that of PhD's, in the late 1940s the Doctor of Social Work program emerged, with some of the earliest DSW degrees having been offered at University of Pennsylvania and Smith College. Some institutions that originally offered Ph.D. programs in Social Work later converted to the DSW professional doctoral degree because of growing and improving trends in social work and in academia.

By the 1960s and 1970s, doctoral degrees for social work increased significantly. By the early 1970s, many universities began only offering the DSW professional doctorate, surpassing that of the PhD degree in social work that was originally offered at many competing institutions.

Over the years, great confusion lay between the Ph.D. and the DSW with many holders of the DSW entering research based positions within higher education. Seeing that the DSW is a professional practice-based doctorate, many institutions slowly began to remove the DSW from their curriculum in an effort to promote research education within the discipline.

With many social workers and allied health professionals pursuing clinical practice based doctoral degrees in other disciplines including education, nursing, psychology, physical therapy and nutrition, the discussion to promote the DSW degree was slowly placed at the forefront.

Understanding that not all practice-based doctorates should be solely focused on advanced clinical practice, the DSW was emerged as an advanced practice professional doctorate.

Having been an advanced practice doctoral degree, the Doctor of Social Work is an important development in community based social services encompassing components in education, social justice, social welfare and policy development/analysis.

Holders of this degree are expected to work in a variety of fields and arenas in social service agencies, health and mental health care institutions, higher education and academia, and community service organizations.

== Time frame ==
The typical time frame for completion of a Doctor of Social Work is 3 to 6 years after earning a master's degree.

== Admission ==
Admission to a Doctor of Social Work program in the USA is highly competitive. Typically, institutions require applicants to hold a master's degree. Applicants may also hold a MSW degree from a Council on Social Work Education (CSWE) accredited program or a related degree including but not limited to Master of Public Administration (MPA), Master of Public Health (MPH), Master of Arts in Education (MAEd), Master of Science in Nursing (MSN), Master of Public Policy (MPP) and the Master of Business Administration (MBA).

== See also ==
- Bachelor of Social Work
- History of Social Work
- Master of Social Work
