= Nancy Ellicott Tomlinson =

American psychiatric social worker

- Born: April 3, 1884; Muncie, Indiana
- Died: November 14, 1958 (aged 74); Fairhope, Alabama
- Burial place: Colony Cemetery, Fairhope
- Occupation(s): Psychiatric social worker, Clinical Psychologist
- Employer(s): State Training School for Girls (Sauk Centre, Minnesota), Medical Dispensary (Saint Paul, Minnesota)
- Organization(s): St. Paul Women's City Club, American Association of Social Workers, Association of Psychiatric Social Workers
- Parent(s): Harry Ashton Tomlinson (1855–1913) and Mary Vandever (1856–1930)

Nancy Ellicott Tomlinson (April 3, 1884 – November 14, 1958) was a psychiatric social worker.

== Early life ==
Nancy Ellicott Tomlinson was born in Muncie, Indiana, on April 3, 1884, the daughter of Harry Ashton Tomlinson (1855–1913) and Mary Vandever (1856–1930).

== Career ==
For 3 years Nancy Ellicott Tomlinson was a Clinical Psychologist at the State Training School for Girls in Sauk Centre, Minnesota. She was a psychiatric social worker at the Medical Dispensary in Saint Paul, Minnesota. She was for one year connected with the Child's Guidance Clinic in Memphis, Tennessee. She was for three years with American Red Cross in the Pacific Area and was the executive secretary of the American Red Cross and County Social and Probation Worker. She was a member of the St. Paul Women's City Club, American Association of Social Workers, Psychiatric Social Workers.

== Personal life ==
Nancy Ellicott Tomlinson lived in Tennessee and Minnesota and moved to Lewiston, Idaho, in 1927.

She died on November 14, 1958, in Fairhope, Alabama, and is buried at Colony Cemetery, Fairhope.
