= Marjorie Steel =

British medical social worker (1904–1985)

Marjorie (Enid) Steel
- Born: 19 March 1904; Maidenhead, England
- Died: 28 April 1985 (aged 81); Chertsey, England
- Occupation: Hospital Almoners a.k.a. Medical Social Worker
- Known for: General Secretary of the Institute of Hospital Almoners (a.k.a. Medical Social Workers)
- Successor: Ann Davidson Kelly

Marjorie Steel a.k.a. "Edith" Steel OBE (19 March 1904 – 28 April 1985) was a British almoner or medical social worker. She was General Secretary of what is now called the Institute of Medical Social Workers from 1946 to 1964.

== Life ==
Steel was born in 1904 in Maidenhead. Her parents were Edith Maud (born Dauncey) and Deane Steel. Her father was a clerk in a bank.

In 1944 she was briefly the head of the Hospital Almoners' Association (HAH) which was the professional group for the 600 people who were almoners in hospitals. There were 120 students in training but they were represented by the Institute of Hospital Almoners. This institute and the HAH merged in 1945 and Steel became its first General Secretary. This was a time for change as the National Health Service was coming into being. It was realised that hospital almoners had made a great contribution to care during the war and there were now a great number of former service personnel who saw a new career as an almoner. Steel's new organisation helped organise emergency training courses to create new almoners. The job was changing too. Previously hospital almoner's would get involved with payments but this service was now free and the almoner was now able to concentrate on social work.

In 1948 Steel was writing in professional journal about the need to end rivalry between Health visitors and other social workers.

Steel retired after she became a popular recipient of an OBE. The institute changed its name to the Institute of Medical Social Workers in 1964. Ann Davidson Kelly was the new organisation's first General Secretary.

Steel died in Chertsey in 1985 and she was cremated.
