= Ann Kelly =

Ann or Anne Kelly or Kelley may refer to:

- Ann Davidson Kelly (1912–1989), British medical social worker
- Ann Wood-Kelly (1918–2006), American pilot
- Ann Kelley (writer) (born 1941), British children's book writer
- Jo Ann Kelly (1944–1990), English musician
- De-Anne Kelly (born 1954), Australian politician
- Ann E. Kelley (1954–2007), American neuroscientist
- Ann Kelley (politician), American educator and member of the Missouri House of Representatives
- Anne Kelly, commissioner of the Correctional Service of Canada from 2018

== See also ==
- Elizabeth Kelly (artist) (Annie Elizabeth Kelly, 1877–1946), New Zealand painter
- Anna Kelly (1891–1958), Irish journalist and the first women's page editor in Ireland
