= Yelloly =

Yelloly is a surname. Notable people with the surname include:

- John Yelloly (1774–1842), English physician
- Nick Yelloly (born 1990), British racing driver
- Margaret Yelloly (born 1934), British social worker
