= Master of Social Work =

Master's degree in the field of social work

The Master of Social Work (MSW) is a master's degree in the field of social work. It is a professional degree with specializations compared to Bachelor of Social Work (BSW). MSW promotes macro-, mezzo- and micro-aspects of professional social work practice, whereas the BSW focuses more on direct social work practices in community, hospitals (outpatient and inpatient services) and other fields of social services. In some countries, such as Australia, the United Kingdom and Hong Kong SAR, some MSW degrees are considered equivalent to BSW qualifications as a qualifying degree.

The degree may also be conferred as Master of Arts in Social Work or Master of Science in Social Work.

== Canada ==
In Canada, the MSW is considered a professional master's degree and is offered through several universities. Most schools are accredited by the Canadian Association for Social Work Education (CASWE).

All students entering an MSW program are required to have a recognized bachelor's degree in a related field. Generally, students with a Bachelor of Social Work would enroll in a one-year program, whereas those with other undergraduate degrees (Bachelor of Arts, Bachelor of Science, etc.) would enroll in a two-year program. In Canada, the average Master of Social Work graduate can earn anywhere from C$60,000 to C$150,000, depending on their role and work environment.

The oldest social work program in Canada is offered at the University of Toronto through the Factor-Inwentash Faculty of Social Work. Social work students at the U of T choose from a number of specializations (gerontology; children and their families; mental health and health; human service management and leadership; and social justice and diversity), with opportunities to pursue a variety of collaborative programs, such as Addiction Studies, Sexual Diversity Studies, and Community Development, to name a few. Students could also pursue their MSW degrees in combination with either a Master of Health Science or a Juris Doctor degree.

Canadian universities that offer the MSW:

- Carleton University
- Dalhousie University
- Lakehead University
- McGill University
- McMaster University
- Memorial University
- Toronto Metropolitan University
- Université de Moncton
- Université de Montréal
- Université de Sherbrooke
- Université du Québec à Montréal
- Université du Québec en Outaouais
- Université Laval
- University of British Columbia
- University of Calgary
- University of the Fraser Valley
- University of Manitoba
- University of Northern British Columbia
- University of Ottawa
- University of Toronto
- University of Victoria
- University of Waterloo
- University of Western Ontario
- University of Windsor
- Wilfrid Laurier University
- York University

== United Kingdom ==
In the United Kingdom, clinical social work could first be studied in academia as part of a certificate program beginning in 1908. Later, two and three year programs were introduced. The Tavistock Clinic in London remains the leading centre for the study of clinically oriented social work and offers programmes up to and including Professional Doctorate level. The Journal of Social Work Practice represents the main organ of research and scholarly output in this area in the UK.

== United States ==
In the United States, MSW degrees must be received from a graduate school that has been approved by the Council on Social Work Education (CSWE) should the graduate seek future licensure. The MSW typically requires two years of full-time graduate study in combination with two years (900–1200 cumulative hours) of internship, also referred to as field practicum, education, or experience. While some students obtain a Bachelor of Social Work (BSW) before pursuing a master's, most MSW programs accept applicants with undergraduate degrees in a broad range of liberal arts fields. Some MSW programs provide BSW graduates with an advanced standing option, allowing them to complete an MSW in a shorter period of time (typically one year).

Most MSW programs allow students to choose a clinical or direct practice track, which focuses on direct practice with clients, or a macro practice track, with a focus on political advocacy, community organizing, policy analysis and/or human services management. While the clinical track tends to be more popular, there has been a resurgence in community practice concentrations recently. There are also opportunities at many universities to obtain joint degrees, such as an MSW and a Public Administration degree, MSW and Public Health, or MSW and Law. The MSW practice scope has broadened in recent years to include the specialty practice areas of geriatrics and work with veterans. In some schools the curriculum is based on a generalist model which integrates the facets of the various practice areas within social work.

The MSW is considered a terminal practice degree in the field of social work. The DSW (Doctorate of Social Work) and PhD in social work are the final degrees offered in the field of social work. There are inherent differences between the DSW and the PhD; the DSW further develops skills to continue practice with individual clients and client systems in the field. The PhD prepares graduates to conduct research and teach in institutions of higher education. The "Master's Degree" earned as part of the completion of a PhD in Social Work is not comparable to the Master of Social Work used in practice and to seek licensure. There are few DSW programs available in the United States.

Top-ranked institutions, such as the University of Michigan–Ann Arbor, Case Western Reserve University, Ohio State University–Columbus, University of Denver, University of Connecticut, and Howard University are investing in, and driving this initiative, making MSW curriculum more accessible to students via online delivery platforms.

Though Master of Social Work is by far the most common degree title used by graduate social work schools in the United States, it is not universal. For example, Columbia University School of Social Work offers an M.S. degree in social work, the School of Social Service Administration of the University of Chicago confers an A.M. degree, and the University of Texas confers the MSSW (Master of Science in Social Work) degree. The Mandel School of Applied Social Sciences at Case Western Reserve University confers the MSSA (Master of Science in Social Administration) degree. The UC Berkeley School of Social Welfare at the University of California, Berkeley and the UCLA Luskin School of Public Affairs at the University of California, Los Angeles both confer the Master of Social Welfare degree, an MSW comparable to the Master of Social Work.

Clark Atlanta University's Whitney M. Young School of Social work is also credited with creating the administration of social work from an Afro-centric perspective. Clark Atlanta's school of social work has also had various stalwarts in the profession affiliated with it such as W. E. B. Du Bois, Dorcas Bowles, Whitney Young, Hattie Mitchell, Naomi Ward and Rufus Lynch.

=== Employment outlook and opportunities U.S. ===
Although it is possible to be a social worker with a bachelor's degree in the U.S., some fields of practice require a master's degree. According to the Bureau of Labor Statistics, the profession is expected to grow by 25% between 2010 and 2020. The growing elderly population is resulting in accelerated job growth among gerontology social workers. Social workers with a focus on mental health and substance use are currently in high demand as offenders are directed to treatment instead of jail time, a trend that is expected to continue. A master's degree could be seen as a tool which will help to compete with tomorrow's job market. The Employment Projection shows that those with higher levels of education in the field tend to earn more than those with just a bachelor's degree.

The median annual salary for social workers according to the 2016 Bureau of Labor Statistics was $46,890, or $22.54 hourly. Between the years 2016 and 2026, the job outlook is projected to increase by 16%, which is 9% higher than the national job growth average. Average salaries will vary depending on the specific field of social work itself. Those who seek employment as social workers in the healthcare industry typically average the highest salaries, ranging between $54,141-$65,489. By obtaining a license in the field of clinical social work, the salary ranges from $40,494 to $76,205 according to PayScale.

== See also ==
- Bachelor of Social Work
- Doctor of Social Work
- History of Social Work
- Medical social work
- School social worker
- International Association of Schools of Social Work (IASSW)
