= Anne Cummins =

Anne Cummins may refer to:

- Ann Cummins, American fiction writer
- Anna Mickelson (born 1980), married name Cummins, American rower
- Anne Cummins (social worker) (1869–1936), British medical social worker
