= Anne Cummins (social worker) =

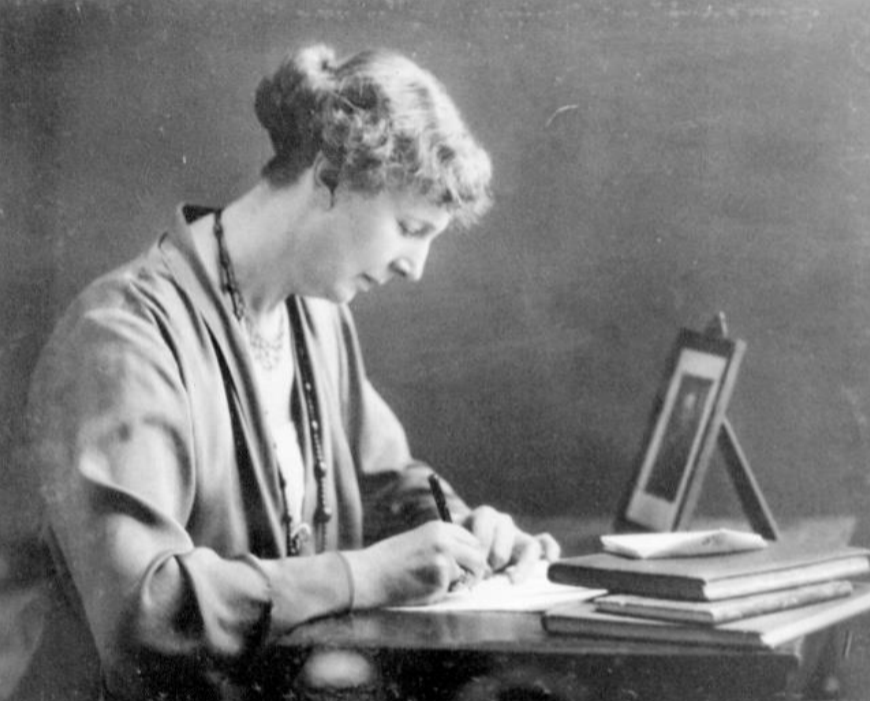
- date unknown
- Born: 12 October 1869; Reigate, England
- Died: 8 February 1936 (aged 66); Broughton, England
- Education: Kensington high school
- Occupation: medical social worker
- Known for: "mother of almoners"

Anne Emily Cummins (12 October 1869 – 8 February 1936) was an early British medical social worker who was later called the "mother of almoners".

== Life ==
Cummins was born in Reigate in 1869. She was educated at Kensington high school and first went to work as a governess. She briefly worked as a teacher before deciding that social work should be her career. She had a natural ability to understand and assist. She was taken on by the Charity Organization Society who sent her to train under Edith Mudd who was an early almoner. She trained and then worked at St. Thomas's Hospital in London. Cummins is credited with inventing the role of a modern social worker attached to a hospital. Her first priorities were patients who had tuberculosis and those who were expectant mothers.

In collaboration with the Southwark Health Society she started regular visits for pregnant women. She would advise on health and cleanliness as well as advising on the care of babies. She encouraged mothers to feed their babies milk having observed three month old babies being given pickles and fried fish. Cummins wanted the families to be self reliant and she set up self help groups. In fact when free meals were offered for Lambeth mothers she opposed this as she felt that the meals might encourage families to rely on charity.

After 1909, Stafford Northcote established a trust in the memory of Cicely Northcote. This money meant Cummins could offer a comprehensive service. She has been called the "mother of almoners".

== Death and legacy ==
Cummins died in Broughton in 1936. The British Association of Social Workers awards Anne Cummins scholarships.
