= Association of Social Workers =

- Abbreviation: ASW
- Predecessor: British Federation of Social Workers
- Merged into: Six other social workers' organisations
- Successor: British Association of Social Workers
- Formation: 1935
- Dissolved: 1970; 56 years ago
- Type: Professional body
- Purpose: Professional body for non-specialised social workers
- Official language: English
- Affiliations: Standing Conference of Organisations of Social Workers

The Association of Social Workers (ASW) was the main professional body for non-specialised social workers in the United Kingdom. It was established as the British Federation of Social Workers (BFSW) in 1935 and changed its name in 1951. From 1949 it opened its membership to all social workers and from 1951 promoted itself as the body to join to work towards a unified profession.

In 1970 the association finally achieved its aim by merging with six other social workers' organisations to form the British Association of Social Workers, having been a member of the Standing Conference of Organisations of Social Workers which had been led by Kay McDougall.
