= John Norman Davidson Kelly =

British theologian and academic (1909–1997)

The Reverend Canon J. N. D. Kelly FBA
- Born: John Norman Davidson Kelly; 13 April 1909; Bridge of Allan, Perthshire, Scotland
- Died: 31 March 1997 (aged 87)
- Relatives: Ann Davidson Kelly (sister)

Academic background
- Education: University of Glasgow; The Queen's College, Oxford; St Stephen's House, Oxford

Academic work
- Discipline: Theology
- Sub-discipline: Christian creeds; Christian doctrine; pastoral epistles; biographical studies of saints and popes
- Institutions: St Edmund Hall, Oxford

Signature
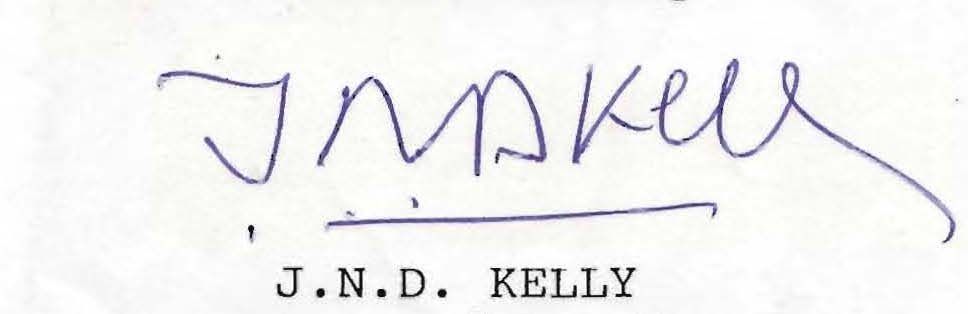

John Norman Davidson Kelly FBA (13 April 1909 – 31 March 1997) was a British theologian and academic at the University of Oxford and Principal of St Edmund Hall, Oxford, between 1951 and 1979, during which the hall transformed into an independent constituent college of the university and later a co-educational establishment.

== Early life ==
John Kelly was born in Bridge of Allan, Perthshire, on 13 April 1909 and was the fourth of five children to his Scottish headmaster father, John Davidson Kelly, and Ann, his English mother. John and his sister Ann Davidson Kelly were home-schooled by his father. (one source says it was a small school). His father was unemployed after the school he was head of had financial difficulties. He had a good education at home but regretted later the lack of social interaction. He studied at the University of Glasgow, graduating with an undergraduate Master of Arts (MA Hons) degree in 1931.

He then went up to Queen's College, Oxford having secured an (essential) scholarship; during his time at Oxford, he received the Ferguson Scholarship and the Hertford Scholarship. At Queen's, he read Literae humaniores (classics) and theology, and graduated with a first-class honours Bachelor of Arts (BA) degree in 1934. Despite an upbringing as a Presbyterian he was confirmed into the Church of England. From 1933 to 1934, he trained for holy orders at St Stephen's House, Oxford.

== St Edmund Hall ==
Kelly was ordained in the Church of England as a deacon in 1934, and served a year of a curacy at the Church of St Lawrence, Northampton in the Diocese of Peterborough. Before completing his diaconal year he was invited to return to Oxford as chaplain and tutor in theology and philosophy at St Edmund Hall by the then principal, A.B. Emden, beginning a sixty-two-year association with the Hall. He was ordained priest in 1935. In 1937, Kelly was made Vice-Principal. During World War II, he wished to become a military chaplain but Emden would not release him, and he instead undertook linguistic work for the Foreign Office. Emden was forced to retire in 1951 because of illness and Kelly became Principal, a position he held until 1979.

Kelly became Principal of the Hall at an important phase of its 700-year history, namely its independence from Queen's College, of which it had been part since 1557. The process, started by Emden in 1937, was brought to fruition in 1958 when Kelly secured the co-operation of Queen's and obtained for the Hall a Charter of Incorporation, presented by the Duke of Edinburgh.

During his tenure as Principal, Kelly oversaw a major fund-raising programme which allowed the building of new student accommodation and dining facilities. A period of illness in 1966 cut short his tenure as vice-chancellor of the university. Between 1972 and 1977 he was pro-vice-chancellor of the university. Finally, before he retired as principal, he oversaw the admission of women into the undergraduate body of the Hall, with their first matriculation in 1979.

== Academic achievements ==
John Kelly was prominent in the theology faculty throughout his association with St Edmund Hall. He was speaker's lecturer in biblical studies from 1945 to 1948 and subsequently held a university lectureship in patristic studies until 1976. He published widely, writing on the development of the early Christian Creeds and doctrines, his Early Christian Creeds and Early Christian Doctrines becoming standard secondary works and seminary textbooks; commentaries on the pastoral epistles; biographical studies, including studies of St Jerome and St John Chrysostom; and The Oxford Dictionary of Popes. He was working on a companion volume to the Oxford Dictionary about archbishops when he died.

In the ecclesiastical world, he became a canon of Chichester Cathedral in 1948, a position he held until 1993. He presided over the Archbishop of Canterbury's Commission on Roman Catholic Relations from 1963 until 1968 and accompanied the archbishop, Michael Ramsey on his historic visit to Rome in 1966. He was a founder member of the Academic Council of the Institute for Advanced Theological Studies in Jerusalem.

He was awarded the degree of Doctor of Divinity (Oxon) in 1951 and fellowship of the British Academy in 1965. He died a bachelor on 31 March 1997 and his cremated remains are interred in the antechapel of St Edmund Hall.

== Selected works ==
- Kelly, John N. D. (1950). Early Christian Creeds (1st ed.). London: Longmans, Green & CO.
  - Kelly, John N. D. (2006) [1972]. Early Christian Creeds (3rd ed.). London-New York: Continuum. ISBN 9780826492166.
- Kelly, J.N.D. (1952) What is Catholicism?, Saffron Walden, Essex : Talbot Press (S.P.C.K.), 39 p.
- Kelly, J.N.D. [1958] (2000) Early Christian doctrines, 5th rev. ed., London : Continuum, ISBN 0-8264-5252-3
- Kelly, J.N.D. [1963] (1987) A Commentary on the Pastoral Epistles. I Timothy, II Timothy, Titus, Black's New Testament Commentaries, London : Addison-Wesley, ISBN 0-06-064329-3
- Kelly, J.N.D. (1964) The Athanasian Creed, Paddock lectures; 1962–1963, London : A. & C. Black, 140 p.
- Kelly, J.N.D. (1969) A Commentary on the Epistles of Peter and of Jude, Black's New Testament commentaries, London: A & C Black, ISBN 0-7136-1010-7
- Kelly, J.N.D. [1970] (1985) Aspects of the Passion, The Archbishop of Canterbury's Lent book, Mowbray's Christian studies series, London : Mowbray, ISBN 0-264-67035-3
- Kelly, J.N.D. [1975] (1998) Jerome : his life, writings and controversies, London : Duckworth, ISBN 0-7156-1231-X
- Kelly, J.N.D. [1986] (2006) Oxford Dictionary of Popes, Updated Ed. with new material by M. Walsh, Oxford University Press, ISBN 0-19-861433-0
- Kelly, J.N.D. (1989) St. Edmund Hall: Almost Seven Hundred Years, Oxford University Press, ISBN 0-19-951559-X
- Kelly, J.N.D. (1995) Golden Mouth : the story of John Chrysostom – ascetic, preacher, bishop, London : Duckworth, ISBN 0-7156-2643-4
