= Margaret Yelloly =

British social worker

Professor Margaret Yelloly
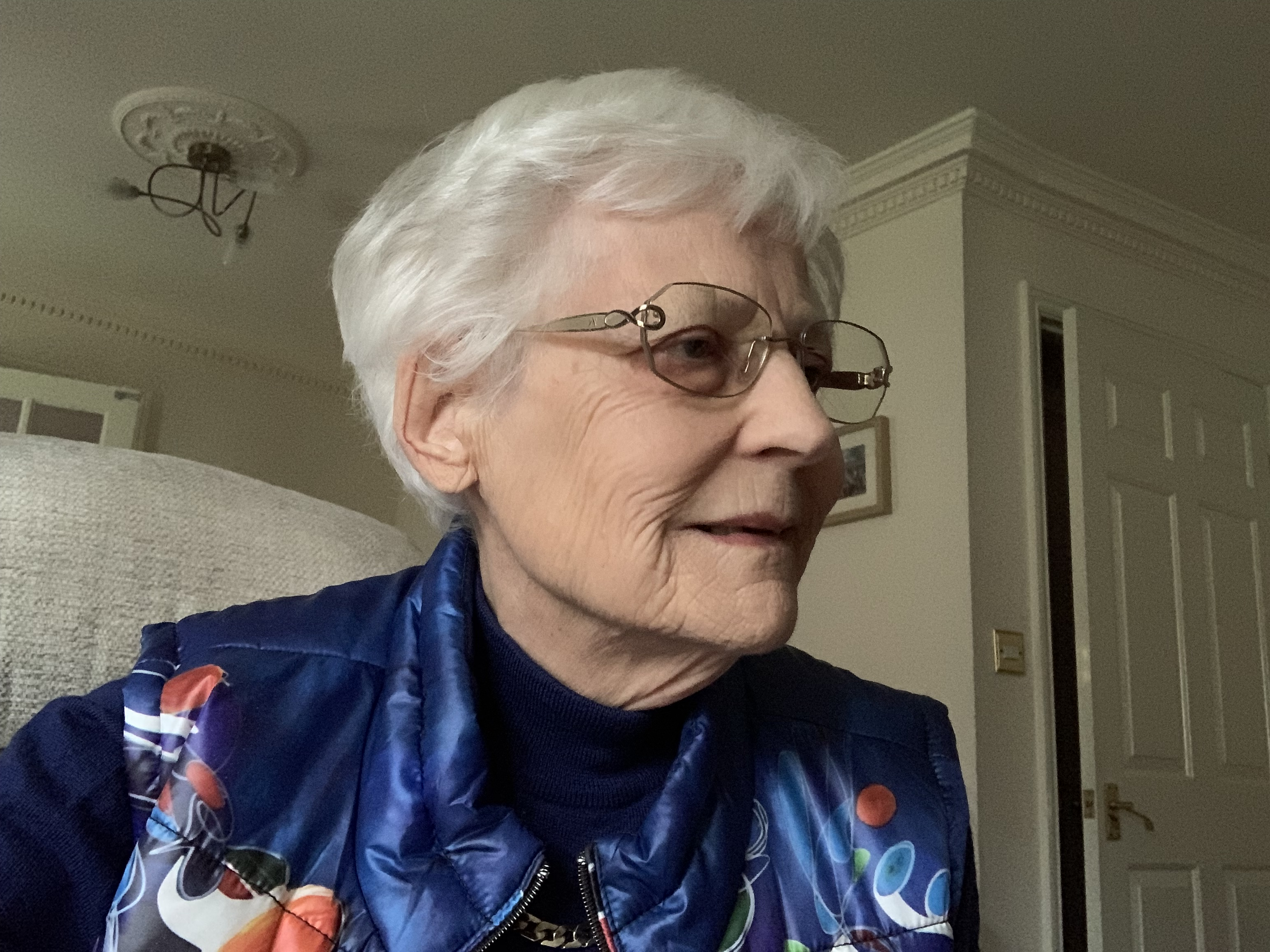
- Yelloly in 2022
- Born: 1934 (age 91–92)
- Other name: Margaret Anne Woodbridge
- Spouse: Robin Woodbridge (married 2004 until his death in 2010)

Margaret Yelloly, known also as Margaret Anne Woodbridge, is a British academic and retired professor of social work. She was editor of the British Journal of Social Work from 1985 to 1987. She chaired the independent panel into the death of Heidi Koseda. Her contributions have helped in the development of British social work education and child protection.

== Education ==
Yelloly was educated at the University of St Andrews, where she gained an MA in logic, Metaphysics and English in 1956. After training in social work and taking a Postgraduate Certificate in Social Science in 1959, she received an MA in 1964 from the University of Liverpool and a PhD in 1975 from the University of Leicester.

== Career ==
Yelloly's first academic job was as Assistant Lecturer in the Department of Social Science at Liverpool University where her research into adoption decisions by single mothers gained her an MA. From 1966 to 1972 she was lecturer in the School of Social Work at the University of Leicester, where she taught social policy and social work practice. Subsequently, she held posts as Lecturer, London School of Economics (1973–76). She was the head of the Department of Applied Social Studies at Goldsmiths' College where she studied the placement of children in the community as compared to the existing model of placing children in residential settings. As Professor of Social Work and Director of Social Work Education, University of Stirling (1986–91), she was actively involved in developing training relating to child abuse and assisting with the production of training materials. She was the first professor of Social Work at the Tavistock Clinic, jointly with Brunel University (1990–93) where she was responsible with colleagues for the development of joint training in child abuse and protection for nurses and social workers.

Her main research interests have been in social work education and its knowledge base, interprofessional education and child protection. Books of note include Social Work Theory and Psychoanalysis, Social Work and the Legacy of Freud (with G. Pearson and J. Treseder) and Learning and Teaching in Social Work: Towards reflective practice (with M. Henkel).

She was editor of the British Journal of Social Work, a social work journal in the UK, from 1985 – 1987.

In 1985, Yelloly was appointed by Hillingdon Borough Council to chair the independent panel into the death of Heidi Koseda, a case that garnered national attention and was raised several times during a full day's debate on child abuse in the UK parliament. The panel's 1986 report was critical of the National Society for the Prevention of Cruelty to Children and made 35 recommendations, including the creation of a national register of children at risk, special training for social workers and changes in legislation. Many of the panel's recommendations were implemented. The recommendation that courts should be empowered to compel disclosure of a child's whereabouts was incorporated into the Children Act 1989.

== Selected publications ==
- Jehu, Derek; Hardiker, Pauline; Yelloly, Margaret; Shaw, Martin (1972). Behaviour Modification in Social Work. London: John Wiley & Sons. ISBN 978-0-471-44140-3.
- Yelloly, Margaret (1979). Independent evaluation of twenty-five placements. [Kent]: [Dept. of Social Services, Kent County Council]. OCLC 1080791413.
- Pearson, Geoffrey; Treseder, Judith; Yelloly, Margaret (1988). Social work and the legacy of Freud : psychoanalysis and its uses. Basingstoke: Macmillan Education. ISBN 978-0-333-39781-7. OCLC 17230716.
- Yelloly, M; Henkel, M, eds. (1995). Learning and Teaching in Social Work: towards reflective practice. London; Bristol, PA: Jessica Kingsley. ISBN 978-1-85302-237-1.

== Personal life ==
Yelloly is an amateur harpsichordist and continuo player, and an enthusiast for baroque and early music. In retirement she gained a Postgraduate Certificate in Advanced Musical Studies from King's College, University of London. In 2004 she married Robin Woodbridge, a viol and recorder player. She has two stepsons and five grandchildren.
