= Mary Stewart (social worker) =

- Born: 1862/3
- Died: 4 January 1925 (aged 62)
- Occupation: First medical social worker appointed in the United Kingdom

Mary Stewart (1862/3 – 4 January 1925) was the first hospital almoner (medical social worker) appointed in the United Kingdom.

Little is known of Stewart's family or early life. She was educated at the North London Collegiate School for Girls and trained as a social worker with the Charity Organisation Society (later the Family Welfare Association).

On 21 January 1895, Stewart was working as secretary of the St Pancras office of the COS when she was appointed almoner to the Royal Free Hospital by Sir Charles Loch, the COS's secretary, an enthusiastic advocate of medical social work. She remained employed by the COS on a salary of £100 per annum, later increased to £125 (the additional £25 paid by the hospital), which was a reasonably good salary for a woman at that time. In 1897, two assistants were appointed to aid her.

In 1899, she resigned from the Royal Free Hospital due to ill-health, but continued to work for the COS. She was knocked down by a car and later died in the Royal Northern Hospital on 4 January 1925.
