= The British Journal of Social Work =

- Language: English
- Edited by: Reima Ana Maglajlic; Vasilios Ioakimidis

Publication details
- History: 1971–present
- Publisher: Oxford Journals on behalf of the British Association of Social Workers (United Kingdom)
- Frequency: 8/year
- Impact factor: 1.884 (2020)

Standard abbreviations
- ISO 4: Br. J. Soc. Work

Indexing
- CODEN: BJSWAS
- ISSN: 1468-263X
- LCCN: 76617152
- JSTOR: 1468263X
- OCLC no.: 45043548

Links
- Journal homepage; Online access; Online archive

The British Journal of Social Work is a peer-reviewed academic journal with a focus on social work in the UK. It is published eight times a year by Oxford Journals for the British Association of Social Workers (BASW). The journal was first published in 1971 which was the year after BASW was formed.

The British Association of Social Workers Kay McDougall British Journal of Social Work Prize is given annually to the author of the best article in the journal. In 2021 it was given to Cynthia Okpokiri for her article about "Parenting in fear: Child welfare micro strategies of Nigerian parents in Britain".

In 2021 the joint editors-in-chief were Reima Ana Maglajlic (University of Sussex) and Vasilios Ioakimidis (University of Essex).

According to the Journal Citation Reports, the journal has a 2020 impact factor of 1.884.

== See also ==
- British Association of Social Workers
