= Marjory Warren =

Marjory Winsome Warren (28 October 1897 – 5 September 1960) is one of the first geriatricians and considered the mother of modern geriatric medicine.

== Early life and career ==
Warren was born in London, to Walter Richard Warren (a barrister) and his wife, Annie (born Dixon). She was the eldest of five daughters. Her younger sister, Enid, became a notable social worker. When she was a child the family moved from Finchley to Highgate in London. Warren attended the North London Collegiate School, like all of her sisters, before studying medicine at the Royal Free Hospital, London. She initially trained in surgery, qualifying with an LRCP MRCS in 1923. After her residency at the Isleworth Infirmary from 1926–1935, she took over the workhouse next door and formed the West Middlesex County Hospital. The following year she conducted an audit of the hundreds of patients in the wards, finding a cohort of delirious and demented patients who required beds with cot sides, severely incontinent patients, elderly and sick but eminently treatable, incontinent patients, and patients who were mobile throughout the day. During this time she developed a system of classification for these patients, including those who were suitable for rehabilitation and thus able to go home, and those who would require residential care in what are now referred to as nursing homes. She had particular success in rehabilitating stroke patients.

== Geriatric medicine as a new specialty ==
In 1943 and 1946, Warren published two papers in the British Medical Journal. Warren argued for the creation of the specialty of geriatric medicine, specialist units in general hospitals, and medical education focusing on the care of elderly people by doctors with experience in the field. On the basis of these seminal papers, the Ministry of Health became involved in this emerging field, and in the 1950s, geriatric medicine was recognised as a medical speciality by the National Health Service (NHS). In 1947, she co-founded the Medical Society for the Care of the Elderly with others including Joseph Harold Sheldon, Trevor Howell in Croydon and Oxford's Lionel Cosin. In time, this would become the British Geriatrics Society. Warren, as founding chair, worked with committee president Basil Mackenzie, 2nd Baron Amulree. Mackenzie was then employed by the Ministry of Health.

Warren promoted the importance of multidisciplinary team care, early mobilisation and active engagement of the older person in their daily activities, and the whole-person approach, which included a patient's social and functional issues in addition to their medical issues. Warren and her colleagues were the first to suggest that all admissions to nursing homes and care facilities be approved following assessment on geriatric units (now standard) and advocated for the need to deal with the complex needs of the chronically ill or infirm older person with an integrated system. While this did not occur in her lifetime (approvals for residential homes were assigned to local government instead), it is now a standard of care in the UK and Australia. Warren herself said: ‘The needs of the elderly frequently fall between the two bodies – the individual being not sick enough to justify admission to hospital and yet too disabled or frail for a vacancy in a home.’

Warren published goals for the healthcare of the elderly patient, which form the foundation of the principles of geriatric medicine.

'* To prevent disease whenever possible;
* To reduce medical disability to a minimum;
* To obtain and maintain maximum independence;
* To teach the patient to adjust himself intelligently to his residual disability.'

Her commitment to patient care was not without conflict. Many of her colleagues did not understand the value of providing care for the largely neglected group of patients, and as a woman, with no further medical qualifications, she often struggled to get her views across. Geriatricians were referred to as members of ‘a second-rate specialty, looking after third rate patients in fourth-rate facilities’ and were met with resistance from general physicians. However, as the ageing population increased, with the prospect that the current model of care would overwhelm government resources, the care of the elderly patient and, subsequently, those who had developed knowledge in their care became of increasing interest at the NHS. This was a paradigm shift in the management of these patients, who had previously been left to languish. As a result, Warren garnered an international reputation and received invitations around the world to lecture in the field. She served as the International Secretary of the International Association of Gerontology.

Warren was remembered as an energetic and enthusiastic doctor who held her colleagues to high standards. She was highly active in many fields including nursing and nursing education, and worked as an examiner for the General Nursing Council, and was a member of the London Association of the Medical Women's Federation, becoming its president before her death.

== Death ==
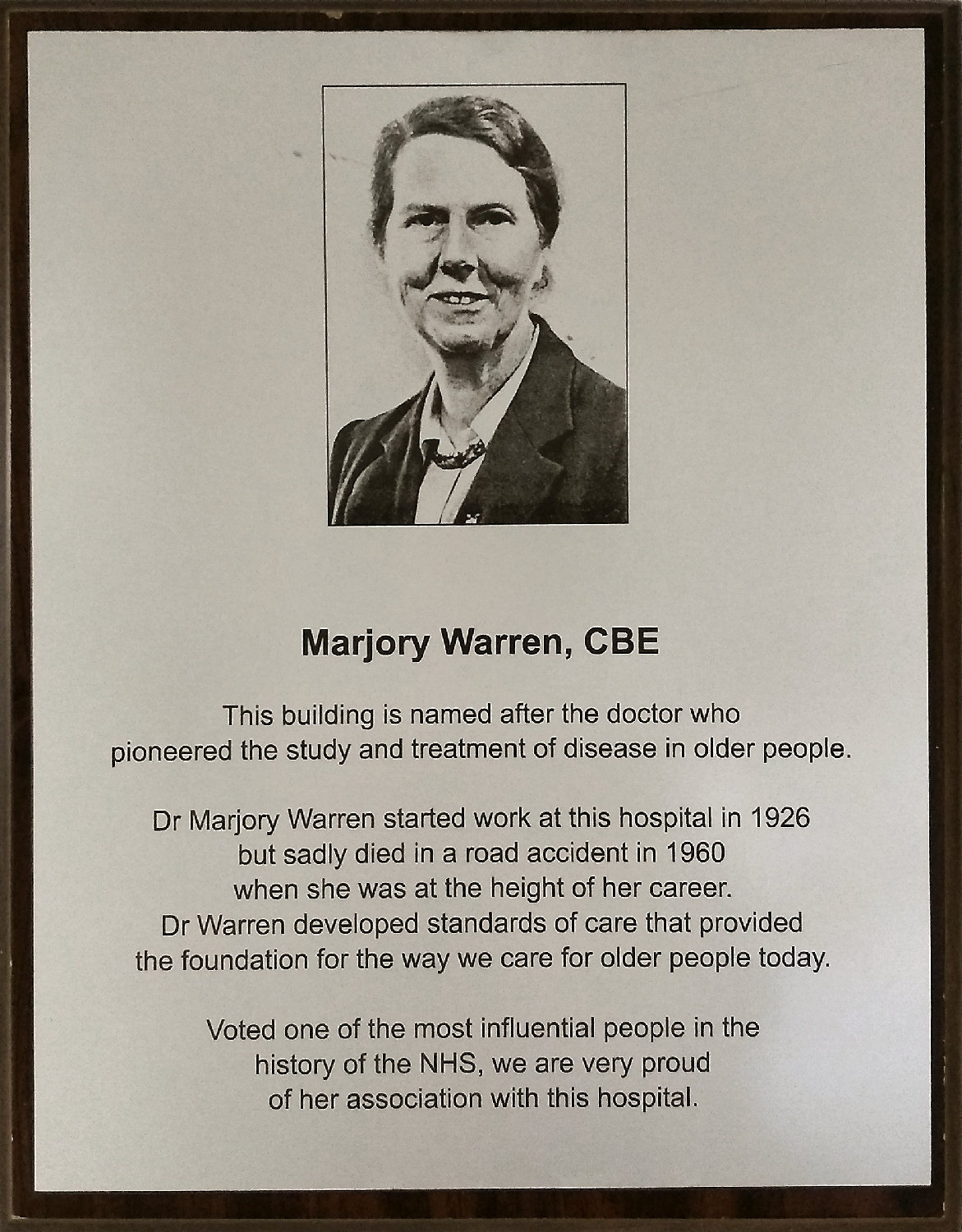
Plaque in West Middlesex University Hospital

Warren died in hospital (Maizières-lès-Metz), France on 5 September 1960 following a car accident. She was on her way to a conference in Germany at the time. A memorial service held on 1 October 1960 at St Pancras Church, London after her cremation in Strasbourg. An acute medical unit in Charing Cross Hospital is dedicated to her. There is also a unit in Stepping Hill Hospital Stockport that bears her name.
