= Ann Davidson Kelly =

British medical social worker (1912–1989)

Ann Kelly
- Born: 1 February 1912; Bridge of Allan, Scotland
- Died: 18 February 1989 (aged 77); Brighton, England, UK
- Education: University of Glasgow
- Occupation: Medical Social Worker (Almoner)
- Relatives: John Norman Davidson Kelly (brother)

(Margaret) Ann Davidson Kelly (1 February 1912 – 18 February 1989) was a British medical almoner and a pioneer of British social work playing a key role in the formation of the British Association of Social Workers.

== Life ==
Kelly was born in Bridge of Allan, Perthshire, in 1912 the last of five children to his Scottish headmaster father, John Davidson Kelly, and Ann his English mother. She and her brother John Norman Davidson Kelly were home-schooled by her father, although one source says it was a small school. Her father was unemployed after the school he was head of had financial difficulties. She had a Presbyterian upbringing.

In 1934 Kelly gained a master's degree in history from the University of Glasgow and three years later she was qualified by the Institute of Hospital Almoners. In 1951 she began nineteen years as the head almoner of King's College Hospital. Under her leadership the hospital became a leader in training social workers.

Kelly became the general secretary of the Institute of Medical Social Workers during the 1960s when social work was in a period of rapid change. She spoke up for her profession and its patients and she was known throughout the country. She was the first and last general secretary of the institute.

Kelly moved forward partnering the London School of Economics in providing courses. She was credited with being the person who brought together so many different organisations to merge into just one. She became one the three assistant general secretaries of the British Association of Social Workers when her institute and several other organisations merged into the new organisation. She was credited with establishing grounding the new association.

Kelly retired to Sussex in 1972 and died in Brighton in 1989.
