= Hortense McClinton =

First Black faculty member at UNC-Chapel Hill (born 1918)

Hortense King McClinton
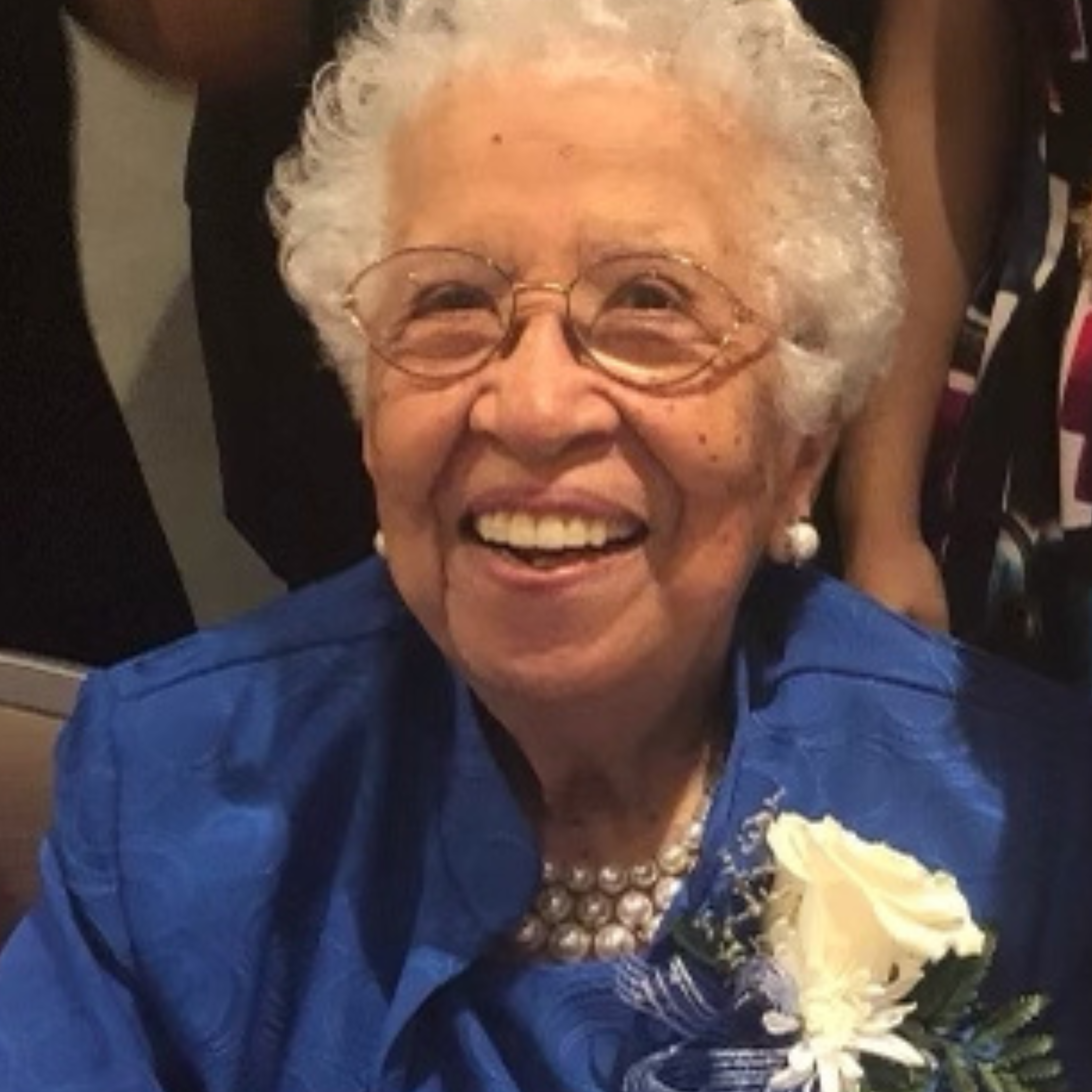
- Hortense McClinton at her 100th birthday party. Photo: S. Charmaine McKissick-Melton
- Born: August 27, 1918 (age 108); Boley, Oklahoma, U.S.
- Occupation: Professor
- Known for: First Black faculty member at UNC-Chapel Hill

Academic background
- Education: Howard University; School of Social Policy and Practice
- Influences: E. Franklin Frazier

Academic work
- Discipline: Social work
- Institutions: University of North Carolina at Chapel Hill

Hortense King McClinton (born August 27, 1918) is an American retired professor of social work. She became the first Black faculty member at the University of North Carolina at Chapel Hill in 1966.

== Early life ==
Hortense King was born and raised in Boley, one of 70 all-Black towns in Oklahoma. Her father, Sebron Jones King Sr., was born in Texas a year prior to the ratification of the Thirteenth Amendment to enslaved parents. He earned a veterinary medicine degree from Wiley College, held positions as a cotton farmer, banker, and veterinarian, and owned a lumber business and peach orchard in Texas. He became the founder and president of the First National Bank of Boley upon moving to Oklahoma in 1910.

McClinton's mother died in childbirth when McClinton was two years old. She was raised by her father, with family support from her siblings, aunt, and maternal uncle. McClinton lived with her maternal uncle, a physician and the leader of the NAACP in Guthrie, Oklahoma, for stretches of time during her schooling years. McClinton's interest in social work was sparked when a woman who worked for the Children's Bureau came to a school assembly to talk about social work when McClinton was in the eighth grade; after hearing her speak, McClinton recalled thinking, "That's it. That's what I want to be".

== Education ==
After graduating from high school in Boley, McClinton attended Langston College in Oklahoma City for one year before transferring to Howard University in 1936, where her older brother was already a student. She served in a number of campus leadership roles, including as the president of the Campus Y, a senior mentor for first-year women, and Dean of Pledgees of Delta Sigma Theta sorority. McClinton studied under renowned sociologist E. Franklin Frazier, a public scholar and then-chair of Howard's sociology department, during her undergraduate years.

After earning her bachelor's degree magna cum laude in sociology in 1939 at the age of twenty, McClinton worked for the American Friends Service Committee. She then worked at the Wharton Centre, a settlement house founded to serve Black communities in North Philadelphia where McClinton both worked and lived.

After working for the Wharton Centre for two years, McClinton decided to return to school, becoming the third Black student to graduate from the University of Pennsylvania School of Social Work in 1941. She studied under Jessie Taft, a renowned philosopher and co-founder of the functional approach to social work. McClinton was the only Black student for the entirety of her degree program.

During her time in Pennsylvania, McClinton met and married her husband, John W. McClinton, a certified public accountant from Greensboro, North Carolina.

== Career ==
McClinton and her husband moved to Durham, North Carolina, where he worked as an auditor for North Carolina Mutual Life Insurance Company—the largest Black-owned business in the United States at the time. McClinton had her first daughter in 1948. Having spent ample time working with women, teenagers, and children at the Wharton Centre, McClinton accepted a part-time job at the W.D. Hill Play School, a private day nursery in Durham.

In 1954, McClinton became the first Black social worker and one of only three Black professionals at the Durham County Department of Social Services. She encountered overt racism throughout her time in the department, and was given a caseload consisting only of Black families. After witnessing a doctor at Duke University Hospital mistreat a young girl on her caseload, McClinton transferred all of her clients to the care of a Black physician, and paid out-of-pocket for their medical expenses. McClinton remained in her full-time position at the Durham County Department of Social Services for two years, until the birth of her second daughter in 1956.

In 1960, McClintoin became the first Black professional staff member at the Veterans Administration Hospital, where she worked for six years. She worked in the psychiatry department, as a researcher supervisor and mentor for students from UNC's School of Social Work.

In 1964, the dean of UNC's School of Social Work offered McClinton a job, but she declined because of the uncertain funding attached to the position. McClinton later accepted an appointed to a tenure-track faculty position at the UNC School of Social Work in 1966, making her the university's first Black faculty member. She remained the university's only Black faculty member for three years. At UNC, McClinton served on various committees, advocated for Black students and students with disabilities, and was known for her excellence to connecting School of Social Work graduates with social work positions across North Carolina. In particular, she was a leader of the Committee on the Status of Women, the Carolina Association of Disabled Students, and the Chancellor's Committee on the Status of Minorities and the Disadvantaged.

McClinton's teaching included classes on casework, human development, family therapy, and institutional racism, infused with her own experiences as a social worker in Philadelphia and Durham. She emphasized the importance of recognizing and address systemic injustices—including racism, sexism, and poverty—within the field of social work. McClinton retired in 1984, after almost two decades as a UNC faculty member.

== Recognition and awards ==
McClinton has received a number of awards, and has also had a number of awards named for her. The National Association of Social Workers named McClinton a Social Work Pioneer in 2015. The UNC Black Faculty Staff Caucus honored McClinton with a Legacy Award for distinguished service in 2009, and the UNC General Alumni Association honored her with a Faculty Service Award in 2021.

Awards named for McClinton include the Hortense K. McClinton Faculty Award, given by the Black Student Movement at UNC; the Hortense K. McClinton Outstanding Faculty Staff Award, given by the UNC General Alumni Association's Black Alumni Reunion; and the Hortense McClinton Senior Service Award, given by the Kappa Omicron Chapter of Delta Sigma Theta sorority.

In May 2022, UNC held a dedication service for the Hortense McClinton residence hall and to honor McClinton; the hall had previously been named for Governor Charles Brantley Aycock, known for holding white supremacist views. The dean of the UNC School of Social Work announced that a scholarship fund for social work students who are the first in their families to pursue graduate education has also been created in honor of McClinton.

== Personal life ==
As of 2023, McClinton resides in Silver Spring, Maryland.
