= Medical social work =

Form of social work

Medical social work is a sub-discipline of social work that addresses social components of medicine. Medical social workers typically work in a hospital, outpatient clinic, community health agency, skilled nursing facility, long-term care facility or hospice. They work with patients and their families in need of psychosocial help. Medical social workers assess the psychosocial functioning of patients and families and intervene as necessary. The role of a medical social worker is to "restore balance in an individual’s personal, family and social life, in order to help that person maintain or recover his/her health and strengthen his/her ability to adapt and reintegrate into society." Interventions may include connecting patients and families to necessary resources and support in the community such as preventive care; providing psychotherapy, supportive counseling, or grief counseling; or helping a patient to expand and strengthen their network of social supports. In short, a medical social worker provides services in three domains: intake and psychosocial assessment, case management and supportive therapy, and discharge planning and ongoing care that extends after hospitalization. They are also involved in patient and staff education, as well as with policy research for health programs. Professionals in this field typically work with other disciplines such as medicine, nursing, physical, occupational, speech, and recreational therapy.

== History ==
The history of medical social work is intertwined with the history of social medicine, and developed as a profession throughout as more individuals and scholars began acknowledging the fact that external factors affect patients' health. With medical social work, initiatives like the Anti-Tuberculosis Crusade, the Clean Milk Crusade, the Pure Food Law, the Playground Association, and the School of Hygiene emerged.

=== Britain ===
Medical social workers in Britain and Ireland were originally known as hospital almoners or "lady almoners" until the profession was officially renamed medical social work in the 1960s. In 1895, Mary Stewart became the first lady almoner in Britain with her appointment to the Royal Free Hospital in London for a three-month trial period. Some sources credit Anne Cummins as the "mother of almoners" as she had the ability and the funding to first establish a comprehensive social work service at St Thomas's Hospital in London in 1909. Lady almoners determined the patient's ability to contribute towards their own medical care at charity hospitals. This approach was also followed by Australia during its vassal period with Great Britain. They adopted an approach similar to strength-based case management, and formal education for almoners was introduced in Australia in the early 1920s to carry out the required tasks.

In 1922, the Institute of Hospital Almoners in Britain was formed. A group focusing on the application of psychology to the treatment of mental illness separated from it and established the Association of Psychiatric Social Workers, largely due to the mental health courses provided by the London School of Economics in 1929. In 1964, two separate professional bodies of Hospital Almoners, one an institute and the other an association, merged to become the Institute of Medical Social Workers. These professional groups later merged with the British Association of Social Workers, which was formed in 1970. In Britain, medical social workers were transferred from the National Health Service (NHS) into local authority Social Services Departments in 1974 and generally became known as hospital social workers.

=== China ===
Medical social work was started in 1921 by Ida Pruitt in Beijing. In-service training was given to social workers for carrying out casework, adoption services and recuperation services.

=== India ===
Dr. Clifford Manshardt, an American missionary in 1936, started formal training in social work in India through Dorabji Tata Graduate School of Social Work. The first medical social worker was appointed in 1946 in J.J. Hospital, Bombay. In 1960s scope of medical social workers increased in India.

=== Ireland ===
In Ireland, the origins of medical social work go back to paediatrician Ella Webb, the first physician in Ireland to appoint almoners to work in her dispensary for sick children that she established in the Adelaide Hospital in Dublin, and to Winifred Alcock, the first almoner appointed by Webb in 1918.

=== Singapore ===
Almoners from St Thomas’ Hospital, London, who arrived in Singapore in 1948 and 1949 are recognized as the forerunners of hospital social worker's in Singapore. Medical Social Worker is a Singapore Ministry of Health recognized profession for psychosocial care and a required professional by bylaw in every clinical specialty department.

=== United States ===
Historically, social workers began engaging independently in the healthcare field much earlier than medical social work, as both public health and social work developed in the late nineteenth and early twentieth century, a consequence of the desire for social and political reform in the Progressive Era.

Two key events central to the development of public health and social work were 1) the settlement house movement, and 2) the charity organization movement. The settlement house movement was focused on developing community centers to address issues of impoverishment, overcrowding, immigration, and child labor in urban areas. The charity organization movement utilized casework to assist impoverished individuals in pulling themselves out of poverty instead of relying on the government to supply basic needs.

At the same time, medicine was beginning to recognize the influence of socio-politico-economic factors on health. With this came the emergence of 2 prominent medical models, the first being a “clinical medicine model” that focused on medical knowledge, and the second being a more public health and sociology-focused “population medicine model”.

The Massachusetts General Hospital was the first American hospital to have professional social workers on site, in the early 1900s. Garnet I. Pelton, Ida Maud Cannon and Dr. Richard Clarke Cabot were the central figures of the hospital social work. Clarke credited his approach as similar to that of Anne Cummins in London, and noted that the active efforts to combat preventable diseases emerged through the actions of social workers. The establishment of medical social work services in the United States is likewise attributed to the inspirational and insightful efforts of the Society for the Aftercare of the Insane in England, the reorganization of Lady Almoners' work by C.S. Loch and Colonel Montefiore, the visiting nurses who conducted the final medical tasks of the hospitals, and the social service training Dr. Charles P. Emerson provided to medical students at Johns Hopkins University.

Cannon started specific training for medical social workers in 1912. The major duties carried out by medical social workers were case management, data collection, follow ups, care coordination, health education, financial assessment and discounting patient medical fees. Cabot and Cannon’s efforts to introduce medical social work as a profession were met by significant resistance from other health professionals and hospital administration, who disagreed on the need for social services and wanted to exert more control over the healthcare environment. This would launch an ongoing debate regarding the professionalization and legitimacy of medical social work in the US.

Between 1918 and 1939—between the two World Wars—the practice of medicine reverted back to a focus on the “medical model” and technical knowledge. This led to more funding and recognition for physicians, and less of a demand for social services and reform by the public. Consequently, to maintain their position in healthcare settings, medical social workers took on more clinical and technical functions.

In this same time period, in 1918, the American Association of Hospital Social Workers was established, officially professionalizing the position. This led to the expansion of schools and classes for medical social work.

In the mid 1920s, the American Hospital Association officially recognized and defined the roles of medical social workers. While Cabot and Cannon initially described medical social workers as “augmenting” the role of the physicians they worked with, the American Hospital Association also described medical social workers as having the responsibilities of “liaison” between patients and providers, and of “educator” for patients. In 1934, the now renamed American Association of Medical Social Workers redefined medical social work as “casework aimed at addressing the relationship between the patient’s disease and social maladjustment”. Over 1600 social work departments were established across hospitals in the US by the late 1930s.

In the 1960s, the evolving status and professionalization of medical social workers coincided with the social and political reforms of the era. Having been previously narrowed to fit into the “medical model”, the public’s call for social change allowed the role of medical social work to broaden to include the “population medicine model”. In 1961, the joint conference between the American Hospital Association and National Association of Social Workers added additional roles to the profession, focused on advocating for the patient and their socio-politico-economic contexts and needs.

The expansion of the medical social work profession brought challenges from physicians and hospital administrators. Medical social workers continued to be perceived as inferior in the healthcare hierarchy, with their department poorly funded and their value determined by medical professionals. Debates between scholars and medical professionals ensued in regards to how expansive the role of medical social worker should be, and how beneficial they really were.

Until this time, the government had not played a significant role when it came to the status and need for medical social workers. But the public demanded higher quality and affordable healthcare from the government and healthcare institutions, and scholars began to criticize the monopoly that medical professionals had over the current healthcare system. As a result, a variety of legislation passed that increased the need for medical social workers. The Hill-Burton and Kerr-Mills Acts of the 1950s and 1960s expanded the establishment of community hospitals. In 1965, the implementation of Medicare and Medicaid likewise increased more individuals’ access to hospitals. With more individuals with complex needs and lower income backgrounds seeking healthcare, medical social workers were likewise in greater demand to assist with social needs.

Soon after, the 1972 Amendments to the Social Security Act, Health Maintenance Organization and Resources Development Act of 1973, and National Health Planning and Resources Development Act of 1974 were all focused on the further expansion of comprehensive, affordable care—which included social services offered by medical social workers. All health professions were held responsible for evaluating and improving various programs and services, including medical social workers.

As these federal programs aimed at expanding access to care for everyone—and especially vulnerable populations—these policies required a new degree of support for navigating medical institutions. Medical social workers became key intermediaries between patients and the increasingly bureaucratic healthcare system. These gains were reflected by another expansion of the role of medical social workers—the “evaluator-researcher” and “consultant”—as described by the American Hospital Association and the National Association of Social Workers in 1976.

In 1984, the Diagnostic Related Groups (DRGs) in the Deficit Reduction Act prompted for more case management and discharge planning, a role that primarily medical social workers took on at the time. This role would later be taken over by nurses. Subsequently, this foreshadowed the negative shift in the status of medical social workers observed in the 1990s. The increased privatization and complexity of healthcare in the 1990s, as well as focus on cost-efficiency endangered the status of medical social work.

In 2010, with another wave of public desire for social and healthcare reform, the Patient Protection and Affordable Care Act (PPACA) was passed. It focused on “the integration of behavioral health services into primary care.” One of the major focuses of the PPACA was the development of an integrated healthcare model called the Patient Centered Medical Home (PCMH). The framework dictates that the primary care setting as an accessible area to provide medical and social needs to patients. The primary care provider is expected to work with a team of individuals to coordinate care for a variety of needs. With this holistic, interdisciplinary approach, the role of medical social workers once again expanded.

Today, while medical social workers in the United States are prevalent, the integration of the profession in some healthcare settings has proven to be challenging. Medical social workers are often not included in hospital administrative discussions, and are not always recognized as being a component of the healthcare setting. Contemporary scholarly literature has focused on investigating the roles that medical social workers truly play in practice, and how they can be better integrated into the healthcare ecosystem.

In recent times, research on healthcare setting dynamics during COVID-19 have suggested a shift in roles for medical social workers. With shortages in healthcare staffing and an influx of patients into hospitals, medical social workers were cited to take on new responsibilities while providing culturally competent care, assistance with basic needs and resources, as well as new needs based on the unique circumstances brought on by the pandemic.

== See also ==
- Preventive healthcare
- Health promotion
- Social determinants of health
- Biopsychosocial model
- Health behaviour
- Occupational safety and health
- Health psychology
- Public health
- Compassion fatigue
- Health administration
