= Society of Mental Welfare Officers =

- Abbreviation: SMWO
- Predecessor: National Association of Authorised Officers and the Mental Health Workers' Association
- Merged into: 1970
- Formation: 1954; 72 years ago
- Merger of: British Association of Social Workers
- Type: Professional body
- Location: United Kingdom

The Society of Mental Welfare Officers (SMWO) was a professional body for social workers (then called Mental Welfare Officers) in the United Kingdom. It was established in 1954 by the amalgamation of the National Association of Authorised Officers and the Mental Health Workers' Association.

The National Health Service Act of 1946 required local authorities to assume extensive mental health responsibilities and created the Royal Commission on the law relating to mental illness and deficiency. This led to the establishment of the SMWO.

The SMWO kept fewer records than most other organizations or associations at the time, but it did publish a journal, 27 editions of which survive from the period 1957-1968, and are now housed in the University of Warwick's Modern Records Centre.

== Merger ==
In 1970 the society merged with six other social workers' organisations to form the British Association of Social Workers, having been a member of the Standing Conference of Organisations of Social Workers since 1962.
