= Moral Welfare Workers' Association =

Professional body for social workers in the United Kingdom

- Abbreviation: MWWA
- Successor: British Association of Social Workers
- Formation: 1938
- Dissolved: 1970
- Purpose: Professional body for social workers
- Location: United Kingdom
- Parent organization: Standing Conference of Organisations of Social Workers

The Moral Welfare Workers' Association (MWWA) was a professional body for social workers in the United Kingdom, particularly those who worked with unmarried mothers and their children. It was established in 1938.

In 1970 the association merged with six other social workers' organisations to form the British Association of Social Workers, having been a member of the Standing Conference of Organisations of Social Workers since 1962.
