= Association of Family Case Workers =

- Abbreviation: AFCW
- Predecessor: Association of General and Family Case Workers
- Successor: British Association of Social Workers
- Formation: 1940
- Dissolved: 1970; 56 years ago
- Merger of: Six other social workers' organisations
- Type: Professional body
- Purpose: Professional body for social workers
- Official language: English

The Association of Family Case Workers (AFCW), known as the Association of General and Family Case Workers from 1954 to 1963, was the main professional body for social workers looking after the welfare of families in the United Kingdom from 1940 to 1970.

In 1970 the association merged with six other social workers' organisations to form the British Association of Social Workers, having been a member of the Standing Conference of Organisations of Social Workers since 1962.
