= Association of Child Care Officers =

- Abbreviation: ACCO
- Merged into: Six other social workers' organisations
- Successor: British Association of Social Workers
- Formation: November 1949 -->
- Dissolved: 1970; 56 years ago -->
- Type: Professional body
- Purpose: Professional body for social workers
- Official language: English
- Affiliations: Standing Conference of Organisations of Social Workers

The Association of Child Care Officers (ACCO) was the main professional body for social workers looking after the welfare of children in the United Kingdom from 1949 to 1970.

In 1946 the interim report of the Curtis Committee on Children Deprived of a Normal Home Life recommended that training courses for fieldworkers in child care be set up at universities, and four such courses were established. In July 1948 a meeting of students on these courses was called to consider the setting up of a professional association, and in November 1949 the Association of Child Care Officers was formed.

In 1970 the association merged with six other social workers' organisations to form the British Association of Social Workers, having been a member of the Standing Conference of Organisations of Social Workers since 1962.

== See also ==
- Clare Winnicott
