= History of social work =

Social work as a profession can be traced back to the first social welfare agencies appearing in urban areas in the 1800s. It has its roots in the attempts of society at large to deal with the problem of poverty and inequality. Social work is intricately linked with the idea of charity work, but must be understood in broader terms. The concept of charity goes back to ancient times, and the practice of providing for the poor has roots in all major world religions.

== Pre-modern antecedents ==
Before the rise of modern states, the Christian church provided social services in (for example) the Mediterranean world. When the Roman Emperor Constantine I endorsed Christianity in the 4th century, the newly legitimised church set up or expanded burial societies, poorhouses, homes for the aged, shelter for the homeless, hospitals, and orphanages in the Roman Empire. These were often funded, at least in part, from grants from the Empire.

By 580 AD, the church had a system for circulating consumables to the poor: associated with each parish was a diaconium or office of the deacon. Monasteries also often served as comprehensive social-service agencies, acting as hospitals, homes for the aged, orphanages, travelers' aid stations.

During the Middle Ages, the Christian church had vast influence on European society and Christians regarded charity as a responsibility and a sign of one's piety. This charity came in the form of direct relief (for example, giving money, food, or other material goods to alleviate a particular need), as opposed to trying to change the root causes of social ills. As there was no effective bureaucracy below city government that was capable of large-scale charitable activities, the clergy carried out this role in Europe until the Early Modern Period.

Other societies had their own systems, involving roles such as those of the traditional healer ("witch doctor"). In Islamic societies, the waqf served as private charitable endowment that was the main support for public education and healthcare. In Imperial China, the Qing dynasty responded to food insecurity in its populace by establishing state granaries.

== Modern development ==
It was not until the emergence of industrialization and urbanization that the informal helping systems of the church and family began to be replaced by social welfare services.

The practice and profession of social work has a relatively modern and scientific origin, and is generally considered to have developed out of three strands. The first was individual casework, a strategy pioneered by the Charity Organization Society in the mid-19th century. The second was social administration, which included various forms of poverty relief. Statewide poverty relief could be said to have its roots in the English Poor Laws of the 17th century, but was first systematized through the efforts of the Charity Organisation Society. The third consisted of social action - rather than engaging in the resolution of immediate individual requirements, the emphasis was placed on political action working through the community and the group to improve their social conditions and thereby alleviate poverty. This approach was developed originally by the settlement house movement.

This was accompanied by a less easily defined movement; the development of institutions to deal with the entire range of social problems. All had their most rapid growth during the nineteenth century, and laid the foundational basis for modern social work, both in theory and in practice.

Professional social work originated in 19th century England, and had its roots in the social and economic upheaval wrought by the Industrial Revolution, in particular the societal struggle to deal with the resultant mass urban-based poverty and its related problems. Because poverty was the main focus of early social work, it was intricately linked with the idea of charity work.

=== Poverty relief ===
The Poor Laws in the aftermath of the Black Death (pictured), when labour was in short supply, were concerned with making the able bodied work.(also see: Sturdy beggar)

With the decline of feudalism in 16th century England, the indigent poor came to be seen as a more direct threat to the social order. As they were often not associated to a particular feudal manor, the government moved towards the formation of an organized poverty relief system to care for them.

The origins of the English Poor Law system can be traced as far back as late medieval statutes dealing with beggars and vagrancy but it was only during the Tudor period that the Poor Law system became codified. Monasteries, the primary source of poor relief, were dissolved by the Tudor Reformation causing poor relief to move from a largely voluntary basis to a compulsory tax that was collected at a parish level. Early legislation was concerned with vagrants and making the able-bodied work, especially while labour was in short supply following the Black Death.

The first complete code of poor relief was made in the Poor Relief Act 1597 and some provision for the "deserving poor" was eventually made in the Elizabethan Poor Law of 1601. It created a system administered at parish level, paid for by levying local rates on rate payers. Relief for those too ill or old to work, the so-called 'impotent poor', was in the form of a payment or items of food ('the parish loaf') or clothing also known as outdoor relief. Some aged people might be accommodated in parish alms houses, though these were usually private charitable institutions. Meanwhile, able-bodied beggars who had refused work were often placed in houses of correction or even subjected to beatings to encourage discipline.

As populations grew in Colonial America, almhouses were built to house vulnerable people with no other support, including people with a long-term illness or older people without families. The first recorded almshouse was built in 1713 near Philadelphia by William Penn, and was only open to Quakers. A second one was built nearby in 1728, this time with public money. In 1736, New York opened the Poor House of the City of New York (later renamed Bellevue Hospital) and in 1737, New Orleans opened the Saint John's Hospital to serve the poor of the city.

The Poor Law Amendment Act 1834 completely overhauled the existing system in Britain and established a Poor Law Commission to oversee the national operation of the system. This included the forming together of small parishes into poor law unions and the building of workhouses in each union for the giving of poor relief. Although the aim of the legislation was to reduce costs to rate payers, one area not reformed was the method of financing of the Poor Law system which continued to be paid for by levying a "poor rate" on the property owning middle classes.

Although the Poor Law Amendment Act 1834 did not ban all forms of outdoor relief, it stated that no able-bodied person was to receive money or other help from the Poor Law authorities except in a workhouse. Conditions in workhouses were to be made harsh to discourage people from claiming. Workhouses were to be built in every parish and, if parishes were too small, parishes could group together to form poor law unions. The Poor Law Commissioners were to be responsible for overseeing the implementation of the act.

In France, poverty relief suffered after the French Revolution reduced the role of the Catholic Church in the country. The Napoleonic Wars further stretched the resources of the poor, and it wasn't until the rise of the French Third Republic around 1871 that the state became organized and wealthy enough to provide thorough poor relief. This was in-particular due to the 1880s efforts of Radical Republicans who emphasized solidarity and referenced back to the Revolution-era Jacobin views on the "sacred national duty" of assistance to the poor.

=== Private philanthropy ===
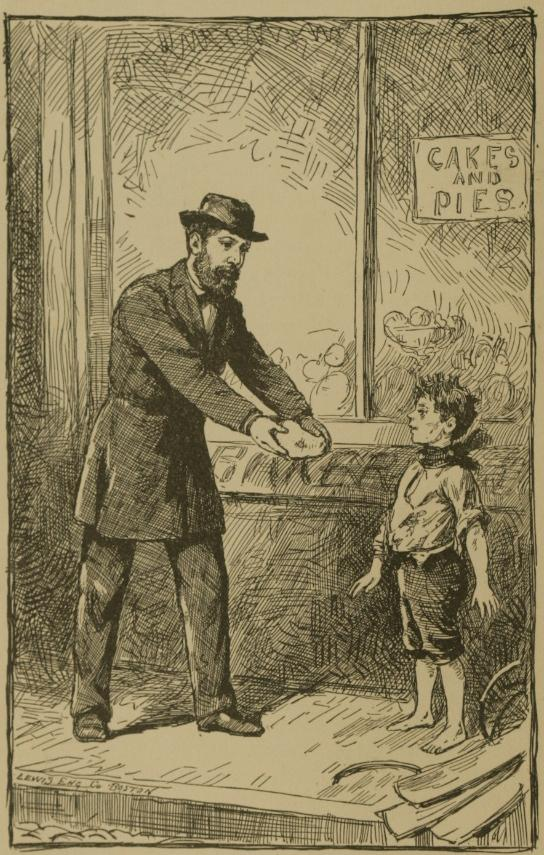
Social work involves ameliorating social problems such as poverty and homelessness.

The 19th century saw a great leap forward in technological and scientific achievement. There was also a great migration to urban areas throughout the Western world, which led to many social problems. This galvanised the socially active, prosperous middle and upper classes to search for ways to ameliorate the physical and spiritual conditions of the poor underclasses. This was coupled with a religious revival, and many Protestant mission efforts (urban missions), attempted to resolve the problems inherent in large cities like poverty, prostitution, disease, and other afflictions. A new philosophy of "scientific charity" emerged, which stated charity should be "secular, rational and empirical as opposed to sectarian, sentimental, and dogmatic."

During this time, rescue societies were initiated to find more appropriate means of self-support for women involved in prostitution. State-built Mental asylums were built from the 1840s to assist in taking care of the mentally ill.

Most historians identify the Charity Organization Society, founded by Helen Bosanquet and Octavia Hill in London in 1869, as the pioneering organization of the social theory that led to the emergence of social work as a professional occupation. COS had its main focus on individual casework. It supported the concept of self-help and limited government intervention to deal with the effects of poverty. The organisation claimed to use "scientific principles to root out scroungers and target relief where it was most needed".

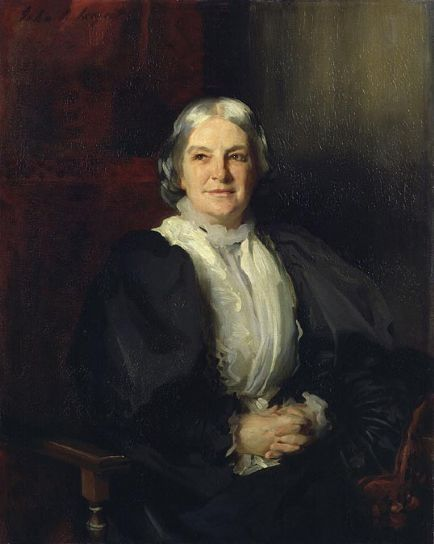
Octavia Hill pioneered many aspects of social work. Portrait by John Singer Sargent, 1898

Alsager Hay Hill was prominent from its foundation, acting as honorary secretary of the council until July 1870, and as an active member of the council until 1880. Hill also worked as an almoner to the Society for the Relief of Distress in the East of London. He campaigned about the many flaws in the poor laws and urged for a more scientific classification of paupers. His 1867 pamphlet, on Our Unemployed, was one of the earliest attempts to highlight the problem of systemic unemployment; he suggested a national system of labour registration. In 1871, Hill pioneered a system of labour exchanges in England, establishing 'The Employment Inquiry Office and Labour Registry,'. There, Hill advised applicants for assistance, and founded and edited Labour News to improve communication between masters and men seeking work.

Octavia Hill is regarded by many as the founder of modern social work. She was a moving force behind the development of social housing, and her early friendship with John Ruskin enabled her to put her theories into practice with the aid of his initial investment. She believed in self-reliance, and made it a key part of her housing system that she and her assistants knew their tenants personally and encouraged them to better themselves. She was opposed to municipal provision of housing, believing it to be bureaucratic and impersonal. Under her guidance, the Charity Organisation Society organised charitable grants and pioneered a home-visiting service that formed the basis for modern social work.

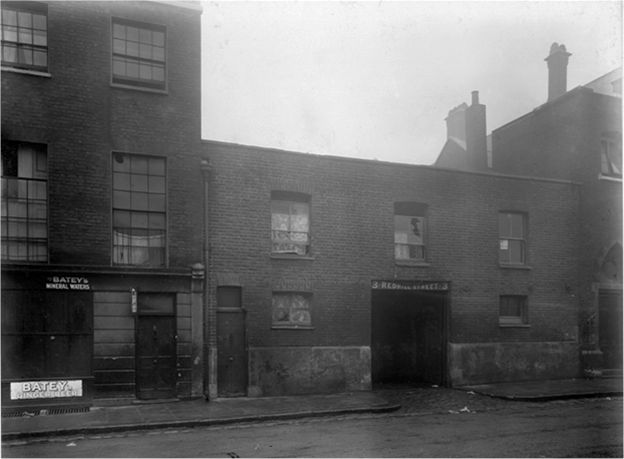
A Marylebone slum in the nineteenth century.

She also provided housing for the poor; after being improved her properties were let to those on intermittent and low incomes. At the heart of the Octavia Hill system was the weekly visit to collect rent. From the outset, Hill conceived this as a job for women only. She and her assistants, including Emma Cons combined the weekly rent collection with checking every detail of the premises and getting to know the tenants personally, acting as early social workers. At first Hill believed, "Voluntary workers are a necessity. They are better than paid workers, and can be had in sufficient numbers." Later, she found it expedient to maintain a paid workforce.

Hill's principles were summed up in an article of 1869: "Where a man persistently refuses to exert himself, external help is worse than useless." She was an outspoken critic of the principles of "outdoor relief" or the Speenhamland system of poor relief as operated by various Poor Law Boards. Because these systems did not encourage recipients to work, she regarded them as "a profligate use of public funds." Under her methods, personal responsibility was encouraged. She insisted on dealing with arrears promptly; she appointed reliable caretakers; she took up of references on prospective tenants, and visited them in their homes; she paid careful attention to allocations and the placing of tenants, with regard to size of families and the size and location of the accommodation to be offered; and she made no rules that could not be properly enforced.

=== Social action ===
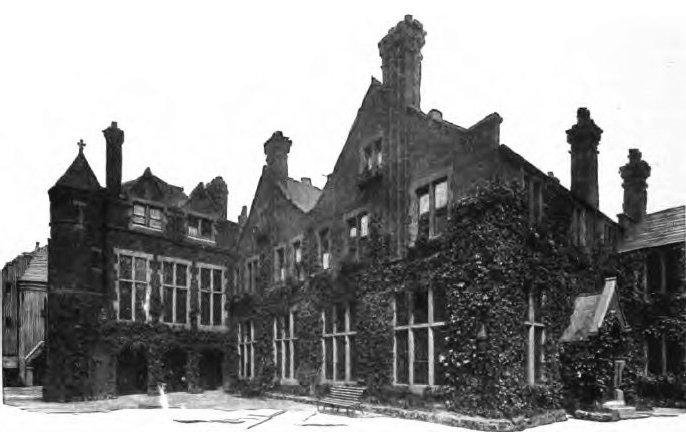
Toynbee Hall settlement house, Whitechapel was founded in 1884 as part of the Settlement movement. Pictured here in 1902.

A stress on social action that developed in the 1880s, was pioneered by the Settlement house movement. This Movement (creating integrated mixed communities of rich and poor) grew directly out of Octavia Hill's work. Her colleagues Samuel and Henrietta Barnett, founded Toynbee Hall, Oxford House in 1884 in Bethnal Green as the first university-sponsored settlement. Another early organization was Mansfield House Settlement, also in east London.

The settlement was named after Arnold Toynbee, an economic historian whose intellectual work laid the foundations of the movement. Toynbee was actively involved in improving the living conditions of the labourer. He read for workers in large industrial centres and encouraged the creation of trade unions and co-operatives. A focal point of his commitment was the slum of Whitechapel, in east London, where he helped to establish public libraries for the working class population. Toynbee also encouraged his students to offer free courses for working class audiences in their own neighbourhoods.

In America, the settlement movement was established by Jane Addams, a young medical student, and Ellen Gates Starr after Addams visited Toynbee Hall and was impressed by the system. She founded Chicago's Hull House in 1889, which focused on providing education and recreational facilities for European immigrant women and children. By 1913, there were 413 settlements in 32 states. The house was both a community service centre and a social research program. Precursors to modern social work arose at Hull House as health professionals began to work with social determinants of poor health.

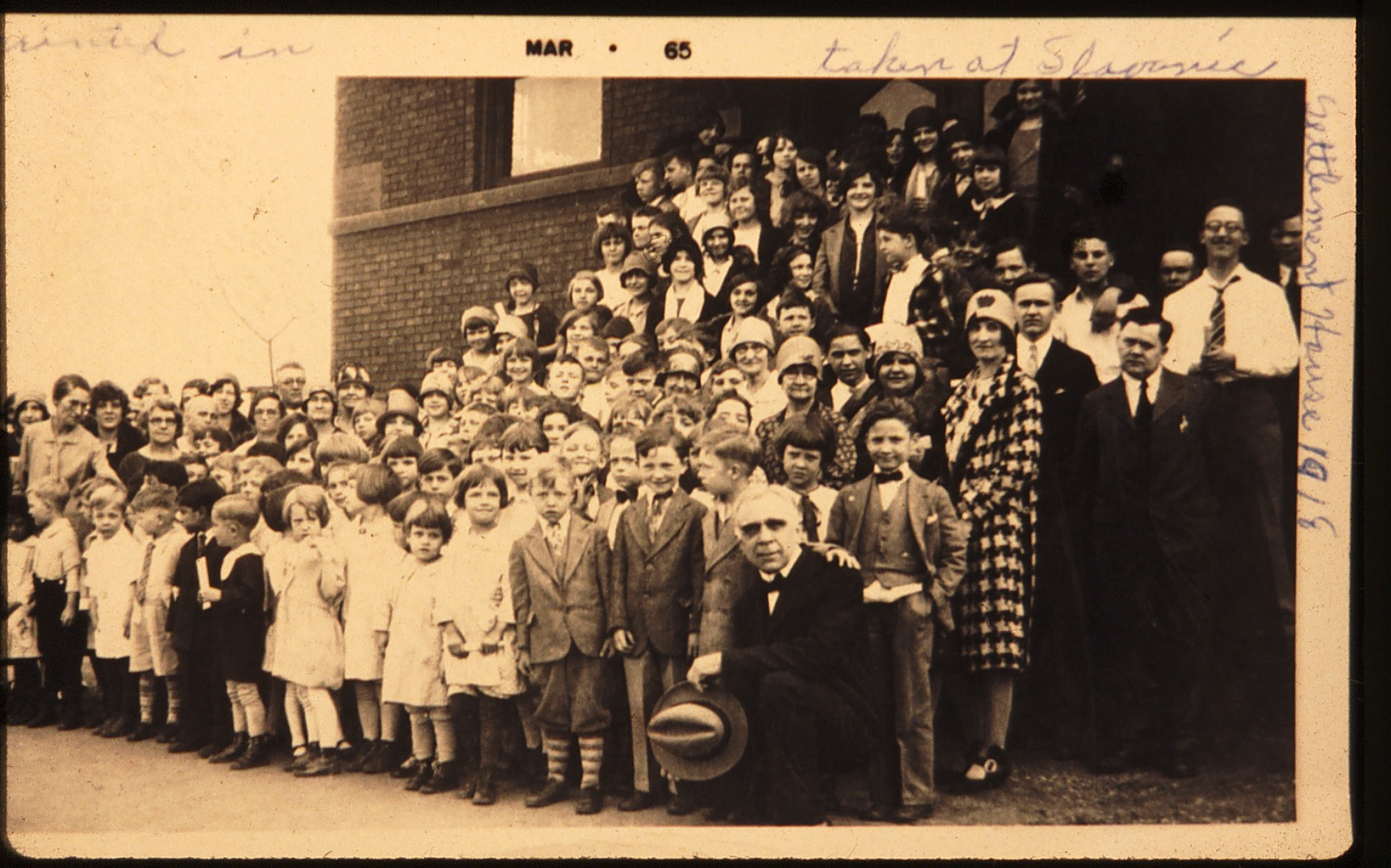
Bohemian immigrant youth at the Lessie Bates Davis Neighborhood House in 1918 in East St. Louis, Illinois.

The concept of the Settlement house movement was to bring upper and middle class students into lower-class neighbourhoods, not only to provide education and social aid, but to actually live and work together with their inhabitants. This soon inspired a worldwide movement of university settlements. The idea was to help members of the future elite understand the problems of wider society; this was especially important at a time when class divisions were much stronger, social mobility was minimal, and the living conditions of the poor were completely unknown to many members of the upper class.

The settlement movement focused on the causes of poverty through the "three Rs" - Research, Reform, and Residence. They provided a variety of services including educational, legal, and health services. These programs also advocated changes in social policy. Workers in the settlement movement immersed themselves in the culture of those they were helping. There were basic commonalities in the movement. These institutions were more concerned with societal causes for poverty, especially the changes that came with industrialization, rather than personal causes which their predecessors believed were the main reason for poverty. The settlement movement believed that social reform was best pursued and pushed for by private charities.

The movement gave rise to many social policy initiatives and innovative ways of working to improve the conditions of the most excluded members of society. Participating universities settled students in slums to live and work alongside the poor local people. Settlement houses focused on education, savings, sports, and arts. The Poor Man's Lawyer service came about because a barrister volunteered his time and encouraged his friends to do the same. In general, the settlement movement, and settlement houses in particular, were "...a foundation for social work practice in this country".

One important participant in the scheme was the philanthropist Charles Booth who published his study Life and Labour of the People in London in 1889 while working at Toynbee Hall. The study was the first systematic attempt at gathering comprehensive statistics and mapping poverty and influenced both social research and the fight against poverty for decades afterwards.

=== Further development ===
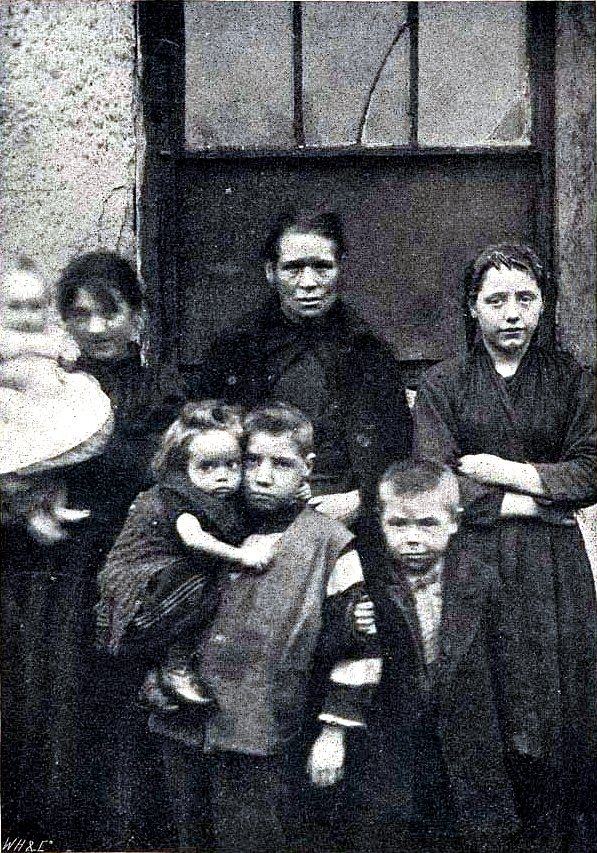
Poverty in towns, slum dwellers in Dublin, Ireland circa 1901.

By the beginning of the 20th century, these different organizations with their diverse intellectual underpinnings were beginning to coalesce into modern social work. Foundations were established to examine the root causes of social problems such as poverty, and social workers became more professional and scientific in their methodology. The Quaker philanthropist and chocolate manufacturer Joseph Rowntree believed that social evils could be tackled by systematic research, and to that end founded the Joseph Rowntree Foundation in 1904. Rowntree wanted to tackle the root causes of social problems, rather than treating their symptoms. His Memorandum of 1904 stated: "I feel that much of the current philanthropic effort is directed to remedying the more superficial manifestations of weakness or evil, while little thought or effort is directed to search out their underlying causes ... [seek] to search out the under-lying causes of weakness or evil in the community, rather than ... remedying their more superficial manifestations."

Rowntree's son, Seebohm Rowntree, carried out a series of seminal surveys into poverty in the city of York that greatly influenced public and governmental attitudes towards poverty and deprivation. His first York study of 1899 (this was followed up in 1935 and 1951) was a comprehensive survey into the living conditions of the poor in York during which investigators visited every working-class home. This amounted to the detailed study of 11,560 families or 46,754 individuals. The results of this study were published in 1901 in his book Poverty, A Study of Town Life and claimed that 27.84 percent of the total population of York lived below the poverty line.

Rowntree defined the poverty line in terms of a minimum weekly sum of money "necessary to enable families... to secure the necessaries of a healthy life", including fuel and light, rent, food, clothing, and household and personal items. This was quantified using scientific methods that hadn't been applied to the study of poverty before. For example, he consulted leading nutritionists of the period to discover the minimum calorific intake and nutritional balance necessary before people got ill or lost weight. He then surveyed the prices of food in York to discover what the cheapest prices in the area for the food needed for this minimum diet were and used this information to set his poverty line.

In analysing the results of the investigation he found that people at certain stages of life, for example in old age and early childhood, were more likely to be in abject poverty, living below the poverty line, than at other stages of life. From this he formulated the idea of the poverty cycle in which some people moved in and out of absolute poverty during their lives. Rowntree's argument that poverty was the result of low wages went against the traditionally held view that the poor were responsible for their own plight.

The differing approaches to social work often led to heated debates. In the early 20th century, Mary Richmond of the Charity Organization Society (COS) and Jane Addams of the Settlement House Movement engaged in a public dispute over the optimal approach; whether the problem should be tackled with COS' traditional, scientific method that focused on efficiency and prevention, or whether the Settlement House Movement's immersion into the problem, blurring the lines of practitioner and client, was superior.

Even as schools of social work opened and formalized processes for social work began to be developed, the question "is social work a profession?" lingered. In 1915, at the American National Conference of Charities and Correction, Dr. Abraham Flexner spoke on the topic "Is Social Work a Profession?" He contended that it was not because it lacked specialized knowledge and specific application of theoretical and intellectual knowledge to solve human and social problems. This led to the professionalization of social work, concentrating on case work and the scientific method.

== Gender perspective in the history of social work ==
The role women and feminist organisations had in the history of social work has been highlighted by several historical studies.

Regarding the development of social service in the beginning of the 20th Century (1910-1920), women were crucial for the recognition of social work as a profession. On one hand, their discourse reinforced the dualist vision of social roles, considering care work was appropriate with the characteristic women were supposed to have (e.g. softness, empathy, solicitude, love, abnegation, etc.). On the other hand, they affirmed a will to change women's place in society by giving them more power and better recognition. Conversely, when feminists are absent, this has an impact on the professionalisation process, relegating women in the margins. This appears particularly in a study on professionalisation of socio-cultural community work from the 1960s in Switzerland. This study shows that men were hired as socio-cultural community workers to develop youth activities, especially with teenage boys, while status of women were less prestigious (assistant, social carers or child care workers) and the child care work they were attributed to viewed as not (or less) relevant for the « socio-cultural community work project » of the centres.

== Medical social work ==
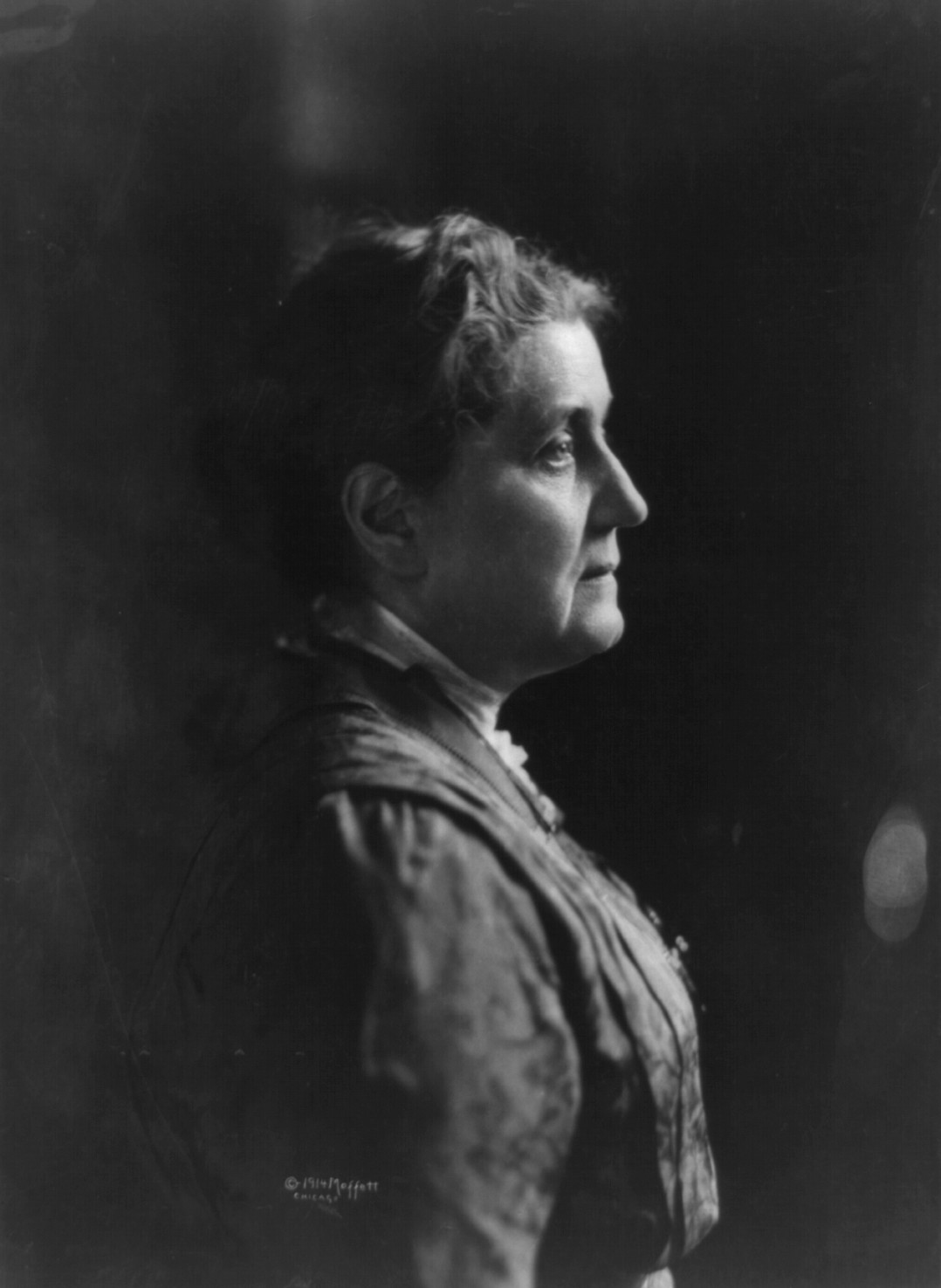
Jane Addams (1860–1935) was a founder of the U.S. Settlement House movement and is considered one of the early influences on professional social work in the United States.

The first professional medical social workers in England were called hospital almoners, and were based in medical institutions. The Royal Free Hospital, London hired Mary Stewart as the first almoner in 1895. Her role was to assess people requesting treatment at the hospital to ensure that they were considered "deserving enough" of the free treatment. The role soon developed to cover the provision of other social programs, and by 1905 other hospitals had created similar roles. By this time, the Hospital Almoners Council had been formed to oversee the new profession.

The first professional medical social workers to be hired in the United States were Garnet Pelton (6 months) and Ida Cannon (40 years), in 1905 at the Massachusetts General Hospital. Dr. Richard Clarke Cabot was a key advocate in the creation of the role, as he believed there to be a link between tuberculosis and sanitary conditions. Both Pelton and Cannon had trained as nurses before taking up the role. After graduating from Simmons College in 1907, Cabot was in charge of the outpatient ward of the hospital, and together with the newly created social workers, they redefined the way in which health and wellbeing was managed. The economic, social, family and psychological conditions that underpinned many of the conditions that patients presented with were recognised for the first time. Social workers would work in a complementary relationship with doctors, the former concentrating on physiological health, and the latter on social health. In addition to this, he saw that social work could improve medicine by providing a critical perspective on it while working alongside it in an organisational setting.

This approach soon spread through other American hospitals, and in 1911, there were 44 social work departments in 14 different cities. Two years later, the number of social work departments had grown to 200. After 1905, most social workers were trained as nurses. The American Association of Hospital Social Workers was set up in 1918 to increase the links between formal education and hospital practice. In 1929 there were ten university courses in medical social work. Around this time, psychiatry and psychology began to compete with social work as the complementary discourse to medicine in hospitals. Social work practice adapted to this by aligning itself more closely with psychoanalytic ideas, and became less concerned with living conditions and social health. While this detracted from the social concerns, it added a more scientific basis to dealing with patients, and challenging behaviours were more likely to be seen as a mental dysfunction than poor moral character.

The increase of social spending after World War Two saw another rise in the number of social workers.

== State welfare ==
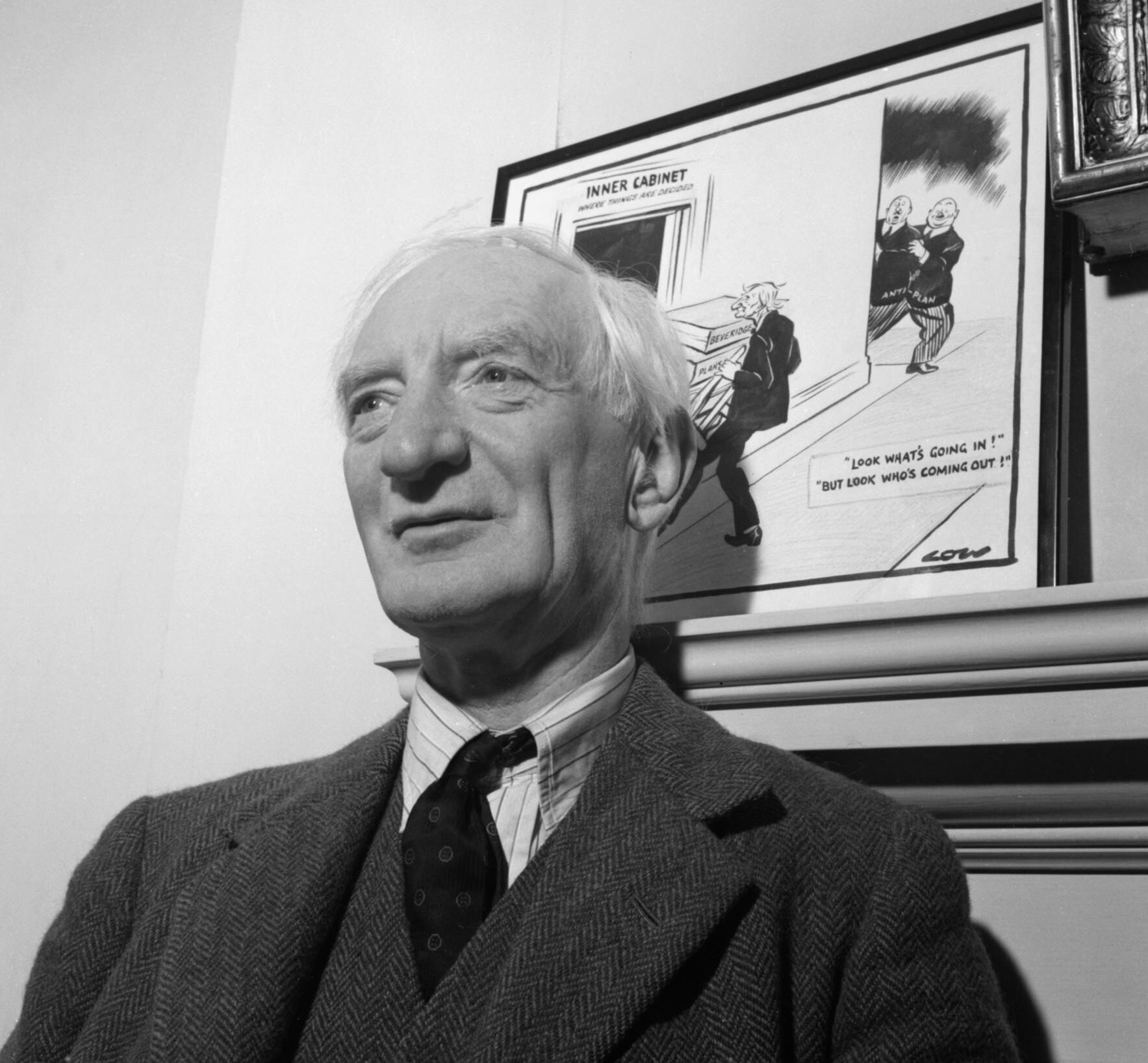
William Beveridge's Beveridge Report of 1942 laid the foundations for the welfare state.

As the problem of poverty moved up the public agenda in Britain, Liberal critics argued that laissez-faire economic policies were not working and that governments had to take proactive measures to reduce poverty, rather than leave the task to privately run organizations. The principles of classical liberalism were being increasingly challenged by downturns in economic growth, a growing perception of the evils of poverty, unemployment and relative deprivation present within modern industrial cities, and the agitation of organized labour. New liberals began to adapt the old language of liberalism to confront these difficult circumstances, which they believed could only be resolved through a broader and more interventionist conception of the state. A liberal convert to greater government intervention was Thomas Hill Green, who believed that the state should foster and protect the social, political, and economic environments in which individuals will have the best chance of acting according to their consciences. The state should intervene only where there is a clear, proven, and strong tendency of a liberty to enslave the individual.

This strand began to coalesce into the social liberalism movement at the turn of the twentieth century in Britain. In their view, the poverty, squalor, and ignorance in which many people lived made it impossible for freedom and individuality to flourish. In the early 1900s, the Liberals under H.H. Asquith introduced various reforms, including health insurance, unemployment insurance, and pensions for elderly workers, thereby laying the groundwork for the future British welfare state.

William Beveridge, often called the 'architect of the welfare state', was pivotal in framing the debate about social work in the context of state welfare provision. His 1942 report on Social Insurance and Allied Services, known commonly as the Beveridge Report, identified five "Giant Evils" in society: squalor, ignorance, want, idleness, and disease, and went on to propose widespread reform to the system of social welfare to mitigate these problems. The report proved very popular with a war-weary public, and went on to form the basis to the post-war expansion of the Welfare State and the creation of the National Health Service, a free at the point of delivery healthcare provider.

== Today ==
In the 21st century, social work often takes a critical and holistic approach to understanding and intervening in social problems. For example, a more common recognition of poverty as having a social and economic basis rooted in social policies rather than representing a personal moral defect. The profession has increasingly emphasized social and personal empowerment operating on the core components of service, social justice, dignity and worth of the person, importance of human relationships, integrity, and competence.

Debate still exists between structural social work and humanistic social work.

== See also ==
- Joyce Lishman - leader in social work education and research
