= Kay McDougall =

- in 1971
- Born: Kate Florence Long; 6 November 1910 November 6, 1910; Camberwell, London, England
- Died: 29 June 1999 (aged 88) June 29, 1999; Welwyn Garden City, England
- Education: London School of Economics
- Occupation: psychiatric social worker
- Employer: London School of Economics
- Known for: creating the British Association of Social Workers

Kay McDougall OBE born Kate Florence Long aka Kate Florence McDougall (6 November 1910 – 29 June 1999) was a British psychiatric social worker. She led the formation of the British Association of Social Workers and she was its first member.

== Life ==
McDougall was born in Camberwell in 1910 (One source says 1919). Her father was a socialist and the family were working class.

In 1937 she was a psychiatric social worker having completed a course at the London School of Economics and she went to work at Warlingham Park Hospital in Croyden.

She led the Social Work department at the London School of Economics. She started a journal called Case Conference which allowed discussion of the work that the emerging profession of social workers were doing.

McDougall was elected to lead the Standing Conference of Organisations of Social Workers (SCOSW) in 1965. SCOSW had been formed in 1962 to bring together the different branches of the social work profession and these were nearly all wound up on the formation of British Association of Social Workers which was formed in 1970. She became the first member of the British Association of Social Workers. McDougall retired from her work that year. The chair of the new organisation was hospital almoner Enid Warren.

McDougall was awarded an OBE in 1967.

== Death and legacy ==
McDougall died in Welwyn Garden City in 1999. The British Association of Social Workers Kay McDougall British Journal of Social Work Prize is given annually to the author of the best article in the British Journal of Social Work. In 2021 it was given to Cynthia Okpokiri for her article about "Parenting in fear: Child welfare micro strategies of Nigerian parents in Britain".
