= Association of Psychiatric Social Workers =

- Abbreviation: APSW
- Merged into: Six other social workers' organisations
- Successor: British Association of Social Workers
- Formation: 1929
- Dissolved: 1970; 56 years ago
- Purpose: Professional body for social workers
- Official language: English
- Affiliations: Standing Conference of Organisations of Social Workers

The Association of Psychiatric Social Workers (APSW) was the main professional body for social workers looking after the welfare of mentally ill people in the United Kingdom from 1929 to 1970.

In 1970 the association merged with six other social workers' organisations to form the British Association of Social Workers, having been a member of the Standing Conference of Organisations of Social Workers since 1962.

The archives of the Association are held at Warwick University.
