= Almoner =

Chaplain in charge of assisting the poor

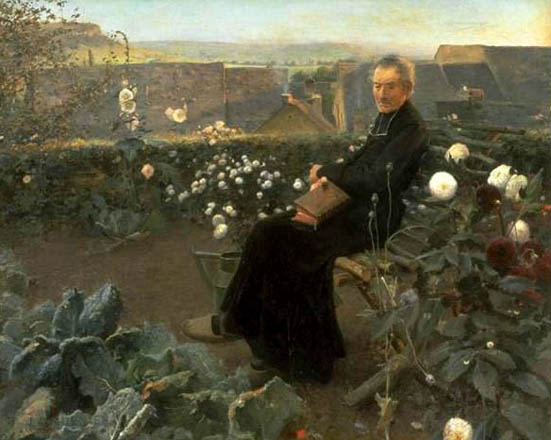
The portrait of the almoner or The breviary (1886) by Jules-Alexis Muenier.

An almoner (/ˈɑːmənər, ˈæl-/) is a chaplain or church officer who originally was in charge of distributing money to the deserving poor. The title almoner has to some extent fallen out of use in English, but its equivalents in other languages are often used for many pastoral functions exercised by chaplains or pastors. The word derives from the Ancient Greek: ἐλεημοσύνη eleēmosynē (alms), via the popular Latin almosinarius.

== History ==
Christians have historically been encouraged to donate one-tenth of their income as a tithe to their church and additional offerings as needed for the poor. The first deacons, mentioned in Acts 6:1–4, dealt with the distribution of the charity of the early Christian churches to needy members. Popes, bishops and Christian monarchs and organizations have since employed their own officers to organize their donations to the poor and needy. Such donations were referred to as alms and the officers as almoners and the position was one of considerable status.

== Catholic Church ==
The papal almoner, formally titled the "Almoner of His Holiness", is responsible for performing works of mercy on behalf of the pope. He is one of a small number of Vatican officials who continue in office when a pope dies or resigns. Until June 2022, he was a member of the papal household; since then he heads the Dicastery for the Service of Charity, an administrative unit of the Roman Curia. Cardinal Konrad Krajewski has held this post since late 2013.

== French royal household ==
The position of almoner within the French royal household was that of Grand Almoner of France (Grand aumônier de France) created by King Francis I.

== British royal household ==
Today in the United Kingdom, the office of Lord High Almoner still exists in the royal household and the holder of the office is responsible, amongst other things, for organizing the ceremony of the Crown's annual distribution of Maundy money. Associated with the almoner's office is the grand almoner, a hereditary title in the hands of the Marquess of Exeter.

== Livery companies and Masonic lodges ==
The almoner also remains an active and important office in the livery companies of the City of London. In Masonic lodges, the almoner's duty is to oversee the needs of the brethren within his lodge. He is the contact for charity and looks after the welfare of the members, including visits to the sick, aged and infirm.

== Hospital almoners ==
The title almoner was also used for a hospital official who interviews prospective patients to qualify them as indigent. It was later applied to the officials who were responsible for patient welfare and after-care. This position evolved into the modern profession of medical social work. Lady almoners existed in the UK from 1895 to the termination of the private medical system in 1948; their task was to determine the patients' ability to contribute towards their own medical care.

== See also ==
- Almonry
