= British Association of Social Workers =

Organization

- Abbreviation: BASW
- Formation: 1970
- Purpose: Professional association of registered social workers and qualified care managers
- Location: United Kingdom
- Website: www.basw.co.uk

The British Association of Social Workers (BASW) is the largest professional association of registered social workers in the United Kingdom. The association has a members' code of ethics that outlines best social work practice and works to support social workers and care managers through education and resources. Headquartered in Birmingham, BASW has regional offices in England (Birmingham), Northern Ireland (Belfast), Scotland (Edinburgh), Wales (Swyddfa Cymru) (Cardiff), and North Wales (Cymru Gogledd) (Colwyn Bay).

== History ==
BASW was formed in 1970 by the amalgamation of the Association of Child Care Officers, the Association of Family Case Workers, the Association of Psychiatric Social Workers, the Association of Social Workers, the Institute of Medical Social Workers, the Moral Welfare Workers' Association, and the Society of Mental Welfare Officers. These were all members of the Standing Conference of Organisations of Social Workers (SCOSW), which had been formed in 1962 to bring together the different branches of the profession and which was wound up on the formation of BASW (the National Association of Probation Officers was also a member, but decided against joining the new association). The Standing Conference of Organisations of Social Workers had been led by Kay McDougall from 1965. She led the Social Work department at the London School of Economics. She became the first member of the British Association of Social Workers. McDougall retired from her work that year.

The chair of the new organisation was hospital almoner Enid Warren.

== Unionisation ==
In October 2011 BASW launched a trade union arm (called the Social Workers' Union). This was its second foray into this territory, as far back as 1978 it launched the British Union of Social Work, which later merged with the NUSW and is now part of the trade union Community. As a certified independent trade union it will have the legal right to accompany individual members to hearings (grievance, disciplinaries etc.) held by employers.

== Publications ==
BASW publishes The British Journal of Social Work, Practice: Action in Social Work journal and the monthly magazine Professional Social Work.
