= American Tapestry Alliance =

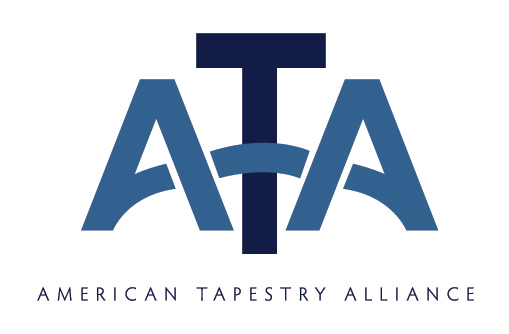
- Formation: 1982
- Purpose: To support the medium of contemporary handwoven tapestry
- Region served: International
- Members: Tapestry weavers and enthusiasts
- Official language: English
- Website: americantapestryalliance.org

The American Tapestry Alliance (ATA) is an association of a broad range of tapestry enthusiasts. ATA was founded in the United States in 1982. It provides educational programs, exhibition opportunities, and a variety of awards for tapestry artists. In addition, ATA publishes a quarterly journal, Tapestry Topics.

== History ==
At the turn of the twentieth century, a few tapestry workshops, such as William Baumgarten & Co, were operating in the United States. Many of the weavers in these workshops had come from Aubusson, Creuse, France, a region known for tapestry production. Immigration from Europe during World War II also brought weavers to the United States who took teaching posts at craft schools and universities, including Black Mountain College. These early teachers inspired many to take up weaving. In the mid 1970s, Jean Pierre Larochette, whose family roots were in Aubusson tapestry, organized a weaving demonstration at the M. H. de Young Memorial Museum, in conjunction with the exhibition, Five Centuries of Tapestry. Larochette, along with three of his students, Ernestine Bianchi, Phoebe McAfee, and Ruth Tanenbaum (Scheuer), went on to form the San Francisco Tapestry Workshop. The SF Tapestry Workshop offered classes and workshops and was a significant influence on the development of contemporary tapestry in the last quarter of the 20th century. Many other tapestry weavers in the United States have studied Navajo weaving with native southwestern people.

In 1976, Jim Brown and Hal Painter, two tapestry enthusiasts, organized a Bicentennial Year tour, offering tapestry workshops throughout the country. As a result of this tour they founded the American Tapestry Alliance in 1982 to unite artists in North America working in the medium of handwoven tapestry. By the mid 1990s, the focus and membership had broadened internationally. ATA received its nonprofit status in 1995 and is governed by a Board of Directors.

== Activities ==
The American Tapestry Alliance offers a variety of programs. The initial exhibitions, Panorama of Tapestry and World Tapestry Today evolved into two biennial, international juried tapestry exhibits, American Tapestry Biennial and Small Tapestry International. The first American Tapestry Biennial was held in 1996 and a new iteration of the show occurs every second year. Small Tapestry International was initiated in 2009 and is also biennial. ATA also supports a very popular non-juried small format exhibition that attracts both professional and beginning tapestry weavers. ATA's exhibitions have featured well known artists such as Muriel Nezhnie Helfman, Archie Brennan, and Marcel Marois. The exhibits are documented through full color catalogs and are reviewed in a variety of publications. In addition, ATA hosts online exhibitions in the TEx@ATA Gallery. These shows feature contemporary tapestry from around the world and have included online documentation of shows organized by other organizations, such as the Australian Tapestry Workshop.

ATA offers educational opportunities, including symposia, online educational articles, and a variety of awards. ATA's artist pages highlight the work of contemporary tapestry weavers. ATA produces programming in conjunction with the Handweavers Guild of America and the Textile Society of America and participated in the Partner Pavilion at the International Sculpture Objects & Functional Art Fair (SOFA Chicago).

== Journal ==
The American Tapestry Alliance publishes a quarterly journal, Tapestry Topics. In addition, every two years ATA publishes CODA, a selection of articles from Tapestry Topics.
