= Eugene Weavers' Guild =

Non-profit organization for wavers and fiber artists

- Formation: 18 March 1946
- Founder: Mary Elizabeth Starr Sullivan, Anita Slater
- Type: NGO
- Legal status: Non-profit
- Purpose: To share weaving and other textile projects, and to present educational programs by fiber artists
- Region served: Pacific Northwest, United States
- Services: Workshops, equipment sharing, lending library, study groups
- Affiliations: Association of Northwest Weavers' Guilds; Handweavers Guild of America; Weaving Guilds of Oregon

Eugene Weavers' Guild is a non-profit organization of weavers, spinners, and other fiber artists in Eugene, Oregon, in the U.S. It was founded in 1946 and has been meeting monthly for more than seventy years. As of 2016, the Guild included 85 members, ranging in skill from hobbyist to professional weavers, from Eugene, Springfield, and rural communities of surrounding Lane County, Oregon, USA. The Guild sponsors workshops, a lending library, skill demonstrations in a variety fiber arts, equipment sharing, and events to raise funds for local charities.

== History ==
On March 18, 1946, 16 people met to discuss forming a group for handweavers, following the example of guilds established in Portland, Oregon, and Seattle, Washington. Guild founder Mary Elizabeth Starr Sullivan had studied weaving at the Cranbrook Art School and taught at the University of Washington. In the 1930s, she had several pieces included in a traveling exhibition, with showings at schools and museums.

Guild historian Clarice Krieg wrote of the founding, "In order to give the group real guild status, a two tier membership was proposed – apprentice and master; and the guild was to assume real responsibility for teaching weaving." However, the founding group recognized that goal was too ambitious, and decided to instead focus on "helping each other with the exchange of our knowledge".

Initially, dues were 50 cents per year, and the group met in members' homes. By 1954, the group had grown to 30 members, and moved to the Woman’s City Club building, raising dues to $3.50 annually to cover rent.

Between 1946 and 1953, the Guild participated in hobby shows sponsored by the Eugene Garden Club Crafts Group. During the same period, the Guild also entered competitions at the annual Lane County Fair, and provided an exhibit with a working loom at the fairgrounds. By 1950, Guild members began holding twice-yearly sales of woven goods, and for the first sales event, fourteen members donate 537 items for sale. In June 1952 members had started monthly workshops for members. By 1954, membership stood at 30, and the Guild moved to the Woman’s City Club building, raising monthly dues to $3.50 to afford the rent. The Guild had attempted to offer classes in 1949, without much success, but that changed in 1951 when Berta Frey, a weaver with a national reputation, offered a workshop. The workshop was "a profitable and successful venture... a true guild experience", according to Krieg.

== Programs and activities ==
In 2014, the local Maker Faire said of the Eugene Weavers' Guild: "The Guild has supported the weaving community in Eugene since 1946 with meetings, workshops, equipment sharing, a lending library... Guild members include both professional and hobbyist weavers at all skill levels."

The Guild offers demonstrations at the Lane County Fair and Oregon State Fair, as well as local venues. The Guild also fosters interest groups at the Eugene Textile Center on various fiber arts topics, with conversations about past, present, and future projects; Fiber Challenge, with a focus on annual themes including weave structures and other research topics; Shibori and Indigo, to explore dyeing methods and applications; and Ply Split Braiding Study Group for those interested in ply split braiding.

== See also ==
- Artisans
- Mathematics and fiber arts
- Textile design
- Wearable art
