= Skinger =

Skinger is a surname. Notable people with the surname include:

- Erica Skinger (born 1949), American alpine ski racer
- Joseph Skinger (1911–1967), American metalsmith and sculptor
