= Suzie Liles =

American fiber artist (born 1956)

Susan Liles
- Born: Susan Manzer Bickford; 1956 (age 69–70)
- Education: University of Oregon; B.F.A., Fibers, with minor in Community Arts, 2004; M.F.A., Fibers, 2006
- Alma mater: University of Oregon
- Spouses: Allen Liles (m. 1976) Robert Van Buskirk (m. 2008)
- Awards: Handweavers Guild of America, "Excellence Award" "Best of Show" at A Weaving Odyssey Fashion Show (2001)

Suzie Liles (born 1956) is an American fiber artist, master weaver, the owner of the Eugene Textile Center and co-owner of Glimakra USA, in Eugene, Oregon.

== Early life and education ==
Susan "Suzie" Manzer Bickford, daughter of George Huff Bickford and Edith Ann Manzer, was born in 1956 in Portland, Oregon. She married Allen Liles in 1976, and they have four children. She married Robert Van Buskirk in 2008.

Liles completed a B.F.A. in Fibers (2004) and an M.F.A. in Fibers (2006) at the University of Oregon. Her M.F.A. terminal creative project, Concealing and Revealing, was advised by Barbara Setsu Pickett.

== Career ==
Liles began weaving in 1982. Liles' career as a professional weaver began in 1984, when she taught private classes at the Weavers Cabin in Roseburg, Oregon. From 1997–2015, she was the studio director at The Weavers’ School on Whidbey Island, Washington, with Madelyn van der Hoogt. In 2002, she studied Jacquard weaving at the Lisio Foundation, in Florence, Italy.

From 2004–2006, Liles held a Graduate Teaching Fellowship at the University of Oregon teaching weaving classes, and in 2006–2007, she also was a fiber arts instructor at the Kansas City Art Institute. In 2011, she was a Workshop Instructor at the Penland School of Crafts in North Carolina.

She opened the Eugene Textile Center in Eugene, Oregon, with Marilyn Robert, in 2008; Liles became the sole owner in 2011. Since October 2015, she has also co-owned Glimakra USA with her daughter Sarah Rambousek in Eugene, Oregon.

== Critical reception ==
The Oregon Weavers' Guild rated her weaving skills as excellent, noting, "Her knowledge of materials is unsurpassed, and her expertise is marked by a great number of commissions."

For an exhibit entitled, Something about Susan, Ellen Snellgrove described Liles' "weavings that show profiles of people. Because of the ambiguous nature of the figures' actions, visitors could either interpret these pieces as violent or loving."

Linda Sellers of The Register-Guard described her as a "master weaver", adding that Liles' creations are often displayed in Handwoven magazine.

== Selected invited exhibitions ==
Liles has participated in multiple invited exhibitions:

- 2002 Treasure Troves Convergence, Instructors Exhibit, Vancouver, British Columbia
- 2005 Graduate Student Invitational, Laverne Krause Gallery, Eugene, Oregon
- 2006 Blue Ridge Handweaving Show, Asheville, North Carolina
- 2006 One Woman Show, Latimer Textile Center, Tillamook, Oregon
- 2006 Terminal 12, Jordan Schnitzer Museum of Art, Eugene, Oregon
- 2006 Threads, Mahlon Sweet Airport Gallery, Eugene, Oregon
- 2007 Members Exhibit at the Surface Design Association, Kansas City, Missouri
- 2008 Jason’s Garden, Eugene Textile Center
- 2009 Susan Show, Douglas County Library

== Selected juried exhibitions ==
She has participated in juried exhibitions since 1991:

- 1991 NW Weavers Conference, Individual Exhibit, Eugene, Oregon
- 1994 1995 Douglas County Library Juried Exhibit, Roseburg, Oregon
- 1996 2000 Oregon Art Annual, Salem, Oregon
- 1999 2000 Best of Oregon Traveling Exhibit
- 1999 Artist-in-Residence Exhibit, Roseburg, Oregon
- 1999 NW Weavers Conference Fashion Show, Eugene, Oregon
- 2001 A Weaving Odyssey Fashion Show, Eugene, Oregon
- 2002 From Rags to Riches, Betty Long Unruh Gallery, Roseburg, Oregon
- 2004 Manipulate Fabrics Show, Interweave Press, Loveland, CO
- 2004 Something about Susan Group Show, Hallie Brown Ford Gallery, Roseburg, Oregon
- 2004 2010 Mayor’s Art Annual, Jacobs Gallery, Eugene, Oregon
- 2007 2008 Best of Oregon, Traveling Exhibit

== Awards ==
Liles earned a first place award at the Oregon Art Annual in 1996. She was also awarded the Handweavers Guild of America Certificate of Excellence in 1996.

The Weaving Guilds of Oregon twice awarded her the "Complex Weavers Award", in 1999 and 2000, in the Best of Oregon Travelling Exhibit, for "The Falconer" and "Dragon in the Forest".

In 2001, she also won "Best of Show" at A Weaving Odyssey Fashion Show, for a doubleweave blue silk dress and shawl with 12,00 sequins in individual pockets.

== See also ==
- Fiber art
- Mathematics and fiber arts
- Hand loom weavers
