= Mutual aid (disambiguation) =

Mutual aid is a voluntary reciprocal exchange of resources and services for mutual benefit.

It may also refer to:

- Mutual Aid: A Factor of Evolution, a 1902 collection of anthropological essays by anarchist philosopher Peter Kropotkin
- Mutual aid (emergency services), an agreement between emergency responders
- Mutual aid, an element of social work with groups
- Mutual aid society, an organization formed for the benefit of members
- Billion Dollar Gift and Mutual Aid: Canada's gift of $4 billion to Britain in the Second World War

== See also ==
- Mutualism (biology), a concept of biological interaction
- Mutualism (economic theory), an anarchist economic theory
