= Van der Hoogt =

Van der Hoogt may refer to:

== People ==
- Cor van der Hoogt, Dutch musician, former member of Fantastique
- Joe van der Hoogt, South African rugby union player, in 2017 Currie Cup First Division
- Madelyn van der Hoogt (born 1941), American weaver, teacher and writer

== Other uses ==
- Lucy B. and C.W. van der Hoogt Prize, formerly C.W. van der Hoogt Prize and since 2022 Debutantenprijs van de Maatschappij der Nederlandse Letterkunde, a literary prize in the Netherlands
