= Fletcher Farm School =

Location
- Ludlow, Vermont; United States
- 43.388790°N 72.662851°W

Information
- Type: Vocational (arts and crafts)
- Established: 1948
- Enrollment: 40–80 per week
- Website: www.createtogethervt.org

The Fletcher Farm School was an arts and crafts school in Ludlow, Vermont, USA, operated by the non-profit Society of Vermont Artists and Craftsmen. Courses were given primarily in July and August, annually. On occasion, other opportunities were explored The school taught a broad range of skills including fiber arts, woodworking, pottery, jewelry and photography.

The School has rebranded and is now called Create Together at Fletcher Farm, and has changed its ethos.

== Location ==
The school is on Vermont Route 103 between Ludlow and Proctorsville. It lies in Vermont's beautiful Green Mountains. The property is at the east end of the village of Ludlow. It was settled in 1783 by Jesse Fletcher and Lucy Keyes. The first frame house they built is said to be the oldest in the town. In 1805 they built a larger addition. Both were still in use as of 2014. The property stayed in the family, and successive owners added buildings. These include barns and cabins where visitors can stay during summer courses. At other times students can stay in Ludlow. The Society of Vermont Artists and Craftsmen runs a small arts-and-crafts store at the school in summer.

== School history ==
Allen M. Fletcher, a banker, was governor of Vermont in 1912–15. His widow and daughters gave the property to the YWCA in 1928 for use as a training school. The program did not succeed and in 1933 the YWCA returned the property to the Fletchers. Later that year a non-profit educational foundation was formed named Fletcher Farm Inc. It was given the property, including the buildings and about 400 acres (160 ha) of meadows and forest, on condition that the property should always by used for educational purposes. The original trustees included Dorothy Canfield Fisher and Robert Frost.

The school gave various adult education courses over the next fifteen years. For example, in the summer of 1934 Grace Coyle organized a two-week group work institute for forty YWCA and settlement house workers at Fletcher Farm. In 1935 two theologians, Paul Tillich and Henry Nelson Wieman, spent ten days at a religious retreat at Fletcher Farm. In 1955, Martin Luther King Jr. wrote his doctoral dissertation on the differences in the two men's views of God.

In 1948 the farmhouse, sugar house and barns were leased to the non-profit Society of Vermont Craftsmen. They have operated the Fletcher Farm Craft School ever since. The noted weaver Berta Frey was an instructor at the Fletcher Farm School in the early years. Irene Slater taught at the school in the 1950s, described as a "professional decorator, specializing in the reproduction of reverse painting of old clock and mirror glasses. Collector of original pieces." Ronald Alfred Slayton taught summer courses at the school in the 1950s and 1960s, where he developed a naturalistic style of watercolor painting, rich in color. Joseph Skinger taught jewelry for several years at the school.

== Programs ==
Students are generally mature adults. Fees cover food and lodging, tuition and studio space. The school offers the oldest and most respected crafts program in Vermont. Subjects have included off-loom weaving, wooden-spoon carving, quilting, pottery, bookbinding and gourd or birch-bark vessel design. In 2014 the Winter/Spring classes included basketry, fiber arts, fine arts and photography, jewelry and lapidary. The summer courses included basketry, clay, early American decoration, fiber arts, fine arts and photography, glass, jewelry, quilting and fabrics, specialty arts and crafts and wood and woodcarving.

== Sources ==
- Alissi, Albert S. (June 30, 2008). Perspectives on Social Group Work Practice. Simon and Schuster. ISBN 978-1-4391-1964-8.
- Berman, Eleanor (August 3, 2008). Traveling Solo. Globe Pequot. ISBN 978-0-7627-5200-3.
- "Classes". Fletcher Farm School.
- Clause, Bonnie Tocher (2012). Edward Hopper in Vermont. UPNE. ISBN 978-1-61168-328-8.
- Duffy, John J.; Hand, Samuel B.; Orth, Ralph H. (2003). The Vermont Encyclopedia. UPNE. ISBN 978-1-58465-086-7.
- "History of the Fletcher Family and our lovely Campus". Fletcher Farm School. Archived from the original on March 3, 2016.
- Morrissey, Charles T. (December 17, 1984). Vermont: A History. W. W. Norton. ISBN 978-0-393-34871-2.
- Norris, J.A. (1979). The Book of Giving – A History of The Ontario Handweavers and Spinners, 1956–1979. Toronto: Ontario Handweavers and Spinners. ISBN 0-9690137-0-1.
- Rogers, Barbara Radcliffe; Rogers, Stillman (October 1, 2006). Vermont. Globe Pequot Press. ISBN 978-0-7627-4214-1.
- Stead, Nancy Wolfe (January 11, 2007). "Skinger family's history at museum". Stowe Today.
- Tree, Christina; Carter, Rachel (September 17, 2012). Explorer's Guide Vermont (Thirteenth Edition) (Explorer's Complete). Countryman Press. ISBN 978-1-58157-773-0.
