= Grace Coyle =

Grace Longwell Coyle
- Born: 1892; North Adams, Massachusetts, US
- Died: 1962 (aged 69–70)
- Occupations: Social worker, teacher
- Known for: Group work theory

Grace Longwell Coyle (1892–1962) was a highly influential American thinker in the area of social work with groups. She wrote important books on the subject, and had great influence on the development of teaching group work concepts.

== Life ==
Grace Longwell Coyle was born in North Adams, Massachusetts, in 1892. Her parents were John Patterson Coyle, a Congregational minister, and Mary Cushman Coyle. Her brother, David Cushman Coyle (1887–1969) wrote popular books on economics and public policy, and was appointed to Franklin D. Roosevelt's "Brain Trust". She graduated from Drury High School in 1910.

Grace Coyle received her bachelor's degree in 1914 from Wells Lake College. She won a scholarship from the College Settlement Association to attend the New York School of Philanthropy in 1915, where she studied social work and earned a diploma in 1915. She worked as a volunteer at a Boston settlement house while at college. From 1915 to 1917, Coyle was a settlement house worker in the coal mining region of northeast Pennsylvania, dealing with new immigrants and factory workers. From 1917 to 1918 she was a field worker with the YWCA in Pittsburgh. From 1918 to 1926, she was industrial secretary for the YWCA national board in New York City. In this role she was responsible for development of education and recreation programs for adult women in industrial jobs. In 1923 she developed one of the first group work courses at the School of Applied Social Sciences of Western Reserve University, Cleveland. Later, she earned a master's degree in economics in 1928 and a doctoral degree in sociology from Columbia University in 1931. Her doctoral thesis Social Progress in Organized Groups was published as a book in 1930.

She is known for her development of the scientific approach to group work practice. Her work, teaching, and writing experiences were related to her interest in group work. She became interested in the way that small groups function.

From 1930 to 1934, she was head of the YWCA national laboratory division, directing research. In the summer of 1934 Coyle organized a two-week group work institute for forty YWCA and settlement house workers at Fletcher Farm School in Vermont. Grace Coyle taught from 1934 to 1962 at the School of Applied Social Sciences in Western Reserve University. In 1940 she became president of the National Conference of Social Work. Coyle was an advocate of expanding government services to reduce social problems. In 1942 she was appointed to the federal War Relocation Authority. In 1942 she was made president of the American Association of Social Workers. She was president of the Council on Social Work Education from 1958 to 1960.

Grace Coyle was in a long-term relationship with YWCA secretary and author Abbie Graham.

== Concepts ==
Grace Coyle made a major contribution through her speeches and writings to acceptance of group work as a component of social work. She felt that group work and case work were compatible and complementary, each would gain by being integrated with the other, and the result would be better service to clients. In her view, group workers required greater awareness of issues of personality and family relationships. Through familiarity with case work the group workers would understand the how a group experience could have therapeutic potential. Case workers needed more understanding of group dynamics and leisure activities. In 1935 she wrote,

One of the primary functions of group work is the attempt to build on the inevitably social interests both of children and adults a type of group experience which will be individually developing and socially useful. By providing within the group work agency for experience in group management, in cooperation for a common interest, in collective behavior, the agency can help its members to discover how to take their place in the organizational life of the community.

Coyle said in a 1946 paper presented to the members of the American Association for the Study of Group Work at the National Conference of Social Work in Buffalo,

My own hope is that the emerging definition of social work may define it as involving the conscious use of social relations in performing certain community functions, such as child welfare, family welfare or health services, recreation and informal education. Case work, group work, and community organization have this common factor, that they are all based on understanding human relations. While the specific relations used in each are different, the underlying philosophy and approach are the same: a respect for personality and a belief in democracy. This we share with case workers and expert community organization people. It is for this reason that I believe group work as a method falls within the larger scope of social work as a method and as defined above.

== Works ==
Publications include:

- Coyle, Grace Longwell; Halsey, Katharine C.; Young Women's Christian Association of Cleveland (1922). College Women's Industrial Research Group Under the Auspices of the Young Women's Christian Association, Cleveland, Summer 1922.
- Coyle, Grace L. (1928). Present Trends in the Clerical Occupations. Womans Press.
- Coyle, Grace Longwell (1928). Jobs and marriage?: Outlines for the discussion of the married woman in business. Womans Press.
- Coyle, Grace Longwell (1930). Social Process in Organized Groups. Practitioners' Press.
- Coyle, Grace Longwell (1934). Personal Significance and Social Action: An Address Given at the Thirteenth National Convention of the Young Women's Christian Associations, Philadelphia, May 1934. Womans Press.
- Coyle, Grace Longwell (1937). Studies in group behavior. Harper & Brothers.
- Coyle, Grace Longwell (1942). Changing Perspectives in the Development of Group Work. The Jewish center, vol.xx, no.3.
- Coyle, Grace Longwell (1947). Group experience and democratic values. Woman's Press.
- Coyle, Grace Longwell (1948). Group work with American youth: a guide to the practice of leadership. Harper.
- Coyle, Grace Longwell; Fisher, Raymond (1950). Group Work with Hospitalized Children.
- Coyle, Grace Longwell (1950). The Relation of the Research Center for Group Dynamics to the Practice of Social Work. School of Applied Social Sciences, Western Reserve University.
- Coyle, Grace Longwell; Festinger, Leon (1950). Current Developments in Group Dynamics. National Association.
- Coyle, Grace Longwell (1958). Social science in the professional education of social workers. Council on Social Work Education.
- Hartford, Margaret E.; Coyle, Grace Longwell (1958). Social process in the community and the group: significant areas of content in a social work curriculum. Council on Social Work Education.

The archives of Case Western University hold a collection of her manuscripts, course outlines and correspondence.
