= Muriel Nezhnie Helfman =

American artist

Nezhnie in her studio with cartoon for Daughters of Earth

Muriel Nezhnie Helfman (February 28, 1934 – April 9, 2002), known professionally as Nezhnie, was an American artist, primarily weaving large tapestries throughout 1956–1992. She gained international attention in the late 1980s with a series of six tapestries, Images of the Holocaust, completed between 1979 and 1989. They were first exhibited as a series at the Sazama-Brauer Gallery in Chicago in 1988. Their imagery and texts are based on historical photographs of victims of Nazi persecution, such as ones by Mendel Grossman, and other materials that Nezhnie collected from the Library of Congress, National Archives, The Pentagon and the Yad Vashem Archives in Israel.

The majority of commissioned work she produced is religious in nature and predominantly Jewish in theme. One notable exception is Imprints, two large curved tapestries that hang suspended above the stairway of the University City Library in St. Louis, Missouri, completed in 1971. She also did a wide range of private commissions and experimental pieces that feature portraits or animated figures often discarding the conventional rectangular format.

== Biography ==
Nezhnie was the child of ethnic Jewish immigrants from the Russian Empire and identified fundamentally with photographs of persecuted European Jews published in the daily newspapers. She showed an aptitude for painting very early. While in high school during the late 1940s, she traveled to the Jefferson School of Social Science in New York City on Saturdays for art lessons. Later, in art school at The Cooper Union, she was thwarted from pursuing portraiture and chose to get a degree in graphic design.

She discovered that tapestry was still a viable contemporary art form by chance on a trip to Paris while her husband, fellow art student Sheldon Helfman, was stationed in Germany. She enrolled at a craft school, Offenbach Werkkunstschule in the Frankfurt suburb of Offenbach am Main. It was her only formal training in weaving.

The Helfman family moved to St. Louis, Missouri in 1960. In 1964 Nezhnie was one of six founding members of Craft Alliance Gallery, which is still operating in St. Louis as of 2010. She was on Craft Alliance's board of directors for 16 years. She represented the United States as the invited artist in the 1986 juried biennial tapestry exhibition, ""Panorama in Tapestry"" in Toronto, Canada organized by the American Tapestry Alliance (ATA) with Marcel Marois representing Canada. In 1990 she was the keynote speaker at the ""Tapestry Forum"", an international gathering of tapestry artists in Portland, Oregon. Two years later Nezhnie was awarded an honorary Doctorate of Fine Arts for her contribution to art from the University of Missouri, St. Louis. She was already suffering from Alzheimer's disease and the honor coincided with the end of her career in 1992.

=== Home life ===
Nezhnie was the only child of Jean Shiezer Liftman and Isadore Nezhnie. Both parents had children from previous marriages that were 8 or more years older than she. Young Muriel was alone in their apartment until her youngest stepsister came home from school because her mother worked in the store below their living quarters, checking in upstairs at slow moments. Nezhnie began drawing at an early age as a way to entertain herself and was encouraged by her sister who enjoyed drawing. Her childhood was further marred by the death of her father when she was six and then four years later, her sister who had taken care of her died in a freak train accident. [3] At the time, newspapers were publishing photographs of persecuted Jews that had a fundamental influence on Nezhnie. As the child of non-practicing Russian Jewish immigrants living in a non-Jewish neighborhood of Jersey City, New Jersey, she set out to discover what it meant to be a Jew by enrolling herself in a class at the local temple.

== Acquiring skills ==
Her introduction to weaving happened in a unique manner when she was in sixth grade of school. A teacher wanted the students to use "potholder looms" to create squares that could be joined into blankets to send to the Russian War Relief. The only student who excelled in the weaving, Nezhnie was told to keep on weaving during class and just listen to the lesson until enough squares were made for the blankets. She later recalled that she "learned about ancient Egypt and the Reconstruction period after the Civil War... while industriously making colorful woven squares.

During the late 1940s and early 1950s, while taking Saturday art classes in New York City at the Jefferson School of Social Science, Muriel solidified her interest in becoming a portrait artist. Large portraits of Communist dignitaries flanking the wall of the school's hallways made a deep impression on her. However, as a student at The Cooper Union, (1952–1955) she battled the strong bias of that era towards abstraction and was told that she would have to leave if she continued painting figuratively. An interest in calligraphy and earlier participation in the school paper and yearbooks in high school inspired Nezhnie to shift majors to graphic design. She excelled in the print format, acquiring skills and a perspective that influenced both subject matter and her stylistic approach throughout her weaving career.

She married fellow art student, Sheldon Helfman, in 1954. After her graduation in 1955, she joined him in Germany where he was stationed in the U.S. Army. Perceiving that her opportunity to paint while her husband, who was equally passionate about painting, had to spend his time on duty was putting stress on their marriage, she began looking for other creative outlets. Nezhnie discovered tapestry was still a viable contemporary art form on a trip to Paris. Quite convinced that she could weave better examples than those she observed that day, she enrolled at a craft school, Offenbach Werkkunstschule, in the Frankfurt suburb of Offenbach am Main. Even though she did not speak German, nor her instructors speak English, this was her only formal training in weaving.

== Early artwork ==
After Helfman's tour of duty, they moved to New Haven, CT, where he received a Master of Fine Arts degree at Yale University and their two children, Ilisha and Jonathan were born. The family moved to St. Louis Missouri in 1960. The consequence of limited communication with her instructors in Germany became apparent as Nezhnie had to struggle through the technicalities of setting up the loom and learning what materials would work best. However, she quickly began producing tapestries. By 1963, she completed a woven commission for a local Children's Hospital and in 1967, completed her first large commission, Genesis, 132" x 84".

She also wove at least 16 freeform or non-rectilinear tapestries by the decade's end. Some were termed "the little people", measuring under 24" in the largest dimension and typically were only rectilinear at the base. Many appeared quite "primitive". In general, they were woven on two-colored warps. Originally used to help her thread the loom, two-colored warps became a signature feature of her weavings. Another group, primarily woven in 1968–69, consisted of large bold female figures whose arms and torso are circular in form suspended on curved armatures. By comparison, commissions for private clients woven during this period were surprisingly formal in design with intricately woven detail and complex imagery.

Odyssey 60" x 60" woven in 1967 as a private commission; Large Embrace 41" x 29" woven in 1968 typical of the "Little people" series; and Loreli 58" x 47" woven in 1969 is one of the large female figures displayed on armatures. The three tapestries illustrate the wide range of styles created in Nezhnie's early career.

Soon after arriving in St. Louis she assessed the art scene as lacking opportunity for local artists to sell their work. In 1964, Nezhnie was one of six founding members of Craft Alliance Gallery, which is still operating in St. Louis, Missouri, as of 2010. She was on Craft Alliance's board of directors for 16 years. Living in near vicinity to the gallery, she became the person often called to solve problems.

== Major commissions ==
The Guild for Religious Architecture Conference Exhibition awarded Nezhnie a merit award for Genesis in 1969, as well as honorable mentions in 1971 and 1972. Besides Imprints, which had two curved panels each 80" x 192" depicting graphic symbols and reference to books, she produced 11 tapestries for religious institutions during the first 5 years of the 1970s. These included three distinct interpretations of Jacob's Dream. The 1971 St. Louis version, an ark curtain, measured 216" x 96" and the 1973 Farmington Hills, MI, ark curtain was 256" x 120". The 1975 Boston Jacob's Dream was a triangular shape fabricated in rughooking by Edward Fields, Inc., in New York City. Exodus, an earlier massive 414 sq. ft. ark curtain was also fabricated in the technique. Hooking was an efficient means of producing irregular shapes for large commissions.

Nezhnie's studio was set up in the basement of the Helfmans' home where three looms enabled apprentices to weave during the day and Muriel to work at night to accomplish the quantity of weaving needed for these projects. The whole Helfman family was involved in the details of studio life, helping with finishing details when needed.

== Personal expression ==
The emergence of pop art in the 1960s reinforced her direction toward both portraiture and print media by 1970. The freedom to incorporate realistic imagery was heightened when she discovered the work of tapestry artist, Helena Hernmarck. Not only did Hernmarck use contemporary subject matter and calligraphy, her style had "surprise created by the discrepancy in what the viewer saw from a distance and at close range."

Nezhnie's first major personal work of the 1970s was the 60" x 138" Wild Cherry Charms in 1971. Five children(including Nezhnie’s son, Jonothan) dressed in Halloween costumes pose on the viewer's right side, with larger-than-life faces of two of them on the left. Large circles appear in front of the figures with letters of a Cherry Charm candy wrapper running sideways across the tapestry. Many more innovative figurative works followed, including her most ambitious non-rectilinear star shaped Constellation, spanning 84". Perhaps Nezhnie's best examples of dichotomy between what appears to be realistic imagery at a distance but becomes unrecognizable color fields when viewed at a few feet are Shining Knight, a portrait woven in nubby brown cotton on a backdrop of shiny mylar, and Nader, which is a very long, 39"x188", magnification of Ralph Nader's eye and eyebrows. In general, she created the images by altering the form of lines. In the case of Nadar the details appear to cluster or cling to the rhythmical vertical lines creating convincingly attractive abstract shapes. In the later 1970s she wove small 7" or 8" lustrous silk portraits framed by dark brown raw silk borders. During the decade, she wove at least 13 portraits, many as private commissions. In all, she executed over 45 tapestries during the 1970s, including the first of the Holocaust series, Daughters of Auschwitz, in 1979.

== Holocaust series ==
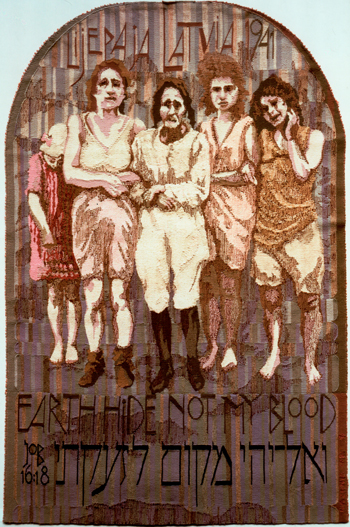
Daughters of Earth 81" x 53" 1981 Holocaust series

A pivotal experience for Nezhnie occurred during a trip to Europe in 1973, when she viewed the Bayeux Tapestry, an embroidered account of the Normandy invasion of England that stretches for 110 feet. Its role in recording a major conflict through a long series of graphic scenes with written commentary provided the direction she needed for commenting on the Nazis and the Jews. However, she struggled for more than 4 years before gaining the confidence to work on such emotive material.

She started by hunting down visual accounts of brutality, yet her goal in designing for these tapestries was to find a balance that would attract viewers enough to the overall image to really look at the unpleasant incident depicted. Placing text within the design would effectively draw the viewer deeper into the content. According to Rees: "Once the image and corresponding text was determined, she called on all her design skills, first to create a color palette that was subdued but appealing, then to hone the image down to essential details in order to give potency to the message."

Five tapestries were displayed at the Sazama-Brauer Gallery in Chicago in 1988: Daughters of Auschwitz, 60'x54', 1978; Daughters of the Earth, 81"x53", 1981; Ghetto Child—Stroop Report, 60"x48" 1982; Liberation, 56"x47", 1987; Deportation, 54"x53", 1988. One painting on non-stretched canvas, Parting Lodz, 48"x96", 1987; was included in this exhibit. It had grommets along its edges for mounting. The sixth tapestry, Pogrom, 64" x 48", was not finished until 1989. Rees claims: "Several examinations are required to come to terms with the piece. Once really seen, its masterful depiction of brutality serves as the culmination of what Nezhnie was trying to accomplish: tapestries that are hard to dismiss." Nezhnie included her cartoons, the schematic line drawings placed behind the weaving surface during production, and preliminary drawings along with the actual tapestries. This offered a very novel viewing experience; with the effect of duplicating her message many times as the viewer circled the gallery. In the book, A Mission in Art: Recent Holocaust Works in America, Vivian Alpert Thompson defines Nezhnie as an "empathizer": "The empathy of the artists who are not survivors is at times so deep that some of them have taken on characteristics normally attributable to survivors…" and, like for survivors, "the creation of these works is not cathartic for the artist… likely because the conditions of evil that their art warns against still exist."

== Impact on the tapestry medium ==
According to Sharon Marcus, an educator, artist and critic regarding contemporary tapestry, Nezhnie was ahead of her time: "many of the technical innovations that contemporary artists are interested in today were utilized abundantly by Nezhnie, in particular shaped weaving and contrast of texture and weave structure." Nezhnie's limited training in the tapestry medium was less a deterrent than an impetus for discovering her own unique style. In the book NEZHNIE: Weaver & Innovative Artist, Rees suggests that; "In her early work, she started to determine what was essential to the process and to examine to what extent the structure of weaving could be altered. This led to the conclusion that neither the rectangular format nor a uniform, weft-faced weave need limit her visual expression… the more the structural features were revealed, the more lively and effective the image became." Thus she would judiciously let one or both of the warp colors (often orange and green yarns) show through in designated shapes or she allowed the warp ends to be seen as small bead-like knots at the edges of the weaving, even in the Holocaust series.

During her mid career work, she explored ways of providing interest by forming novel interactions within the details being created. "In weaving, imagery is created with lines of yarn and the horizontal layering of color. …Controlling line to produce color and definition in weaving is similar to working with the dots in printing. Her creative solutions for manipulating line are a significant contribution to the tapestry community."

"It is fortuitous that Nezhnie chose to switch to graphic design. … Intensive classes in graphic design gave her a broader scope of options for interpreting imagery than she would have had …if she only specialized in painting. Methods of combining color in printing are actually more compatible with weaving than the means most often used by painters in blending colors." This is because, like ink, each yarn is typically a solid color.

== Publications ==
- Duffy, Robert W. Threads of Life: Weaver Honored with Degree For Tapestries on Holocaust. St. Louis Post Dispatch (August 9, 1992).
- Rubin, Deann. "Muriel Nezhnie Receives Honorary Doctorate Degree," ITNET Journal. (Fall, 1992) 18–19.
- Shaw, Courtney Ann. "The Rise of the Artist/Weaver: Tapestry weaving in the United States from 1930–1990," Ph.D. diss., University of Maryland, 1992.
- Nowak, Lynn. "Artist Weave Holocaust Tapestry into Fiber Art". The Port Townsend Jefferson County Leader, (March 14, 1990).
- Family of Woman: Portrait of the Artists," St. Louis Business Journal, (September–October 1989).
- Exhibition catalog. "American Tapestry Weaving Since the 1930s and Its European Roots," with comments by Courtney Ann Shaw, University of Maryland, College Park, MD (1989).
- Exhibition catalog. "World Tapestry Today," American Tapestry Alliance, Chiloquin, OR (1988).
- Jimenez, Gilbert. "Art Sensitively Depicts Horror of the Holocaust," Chicago Sun Times, (June 17, 1988).
- Thompson, Vivian Alpert. A Mission in Art: Recent Holocaust Works in America. Macon, GA: Mercer University Press, 1988.

Goldman, Betsy S. "Artists and Their Families," American Artist Magazine, (October 1987).

- Nezhnie, Muriel. Tapestry Topics, American Tapestry Alliance, Chiloquin, OR (August 1987).
- Exhibition catalog. Panorama of Tapestry. American Tapestry Alliance, Chiloquin, OR (1986).
- Adams, C. B. "Weaver Muriel Nezhnie Preserves Images of Holocaust," St. Louis Globe Democrat, (September 27–28, 1986).
- Greenberg, Sue. "Nezhnie Transforms Holocaust Images into Artistic Statements,"West End Word, St. Louis MO, (March 20, 1986).
- Townsend, W. D. "Weaving the Horror of the Holocaust," Shuttle, Spindle and Dyepot, Handweavers Guild of America, (Summer, 1984).
- Helfman, M. N. 1983. "Remnants of Despair: An Homage to Nelly Sacks," A suite of six intaglio monoprints accompanied by six Nelly Sachs Poems, St. Louis: Little Aegis Editions, (completed later by Sheldon Helfman).
- Townsend, W. D. "A Powerful Weaving of Art and the Holocaust," St. Louis Globe Democrat, (October 31, 1983).
- Castro, Jan. "The Holocaust Tapestries," River Styx 9: "The Elements" Big River Association, St. Louis, MO. (1981): 36–44.
- Harris, James R. "Muriel Nezhnie: Portraits," Chicago Art Examiner, (February 1980).
- Ziemke, Dene. "Ecclesiastical Weaving Part IV," Shuttle, Spindle and Dyepot, Handweavers Guild of America, (Spring, 1979). With three photographs of Nezhnie tapestries,
- Crump, Nancy. Interweave, Interweave Press. (Spring, 1979).
- "At the Museums, and More News," Photograph of "Breath of Life" and artist. Jewish Art: A Quarterly Review, (Summer, 1977).
- Rubin, Richard M. "Interview with the Helfmans," THE SEEN Newspaper of the Art Coordinating Council for the Area, St. Louis MO. (January 1977).
- Parker, Xenia Ley. Creative Handweaving, New York, Dial Press, 1976. With photographs of several of Nezhnie's tapestries,
- Exhibition catalog. "Textiles: Past & Prologue," National Handweavers Invitational Exhibition, Greenville County Museum of Art, Greenville, SC. (1976).
- Griffith, Ann. "'Breath of Life' Tapestry Represents Natural Human State," Charleston Daily Mail, Charleston, WV. (January 29, 1975).
- McCue, George. "Seppa, Nezhnie Craft Objects as Fine Arts on Display at Museum," St. Louis Post Dispatch, (December 10, 1974).
- Peters, John Brod. "Helfman, Seppa Works Displayed," St. Louis Globe Democrat, (November 30 – December 1, 1974).
- Helfman, Muriel Nezhnie. "Tapestry for a Midwest Chapel," Handwearer & Craftsman 2, no 2 (1970):8.
- Haggie, Helen. "First Plymouth Dedicates New Project," Lincoln Sunday Journal & Star, (September 22, 1968).
- Art Scene, Chicago IL. (September 1968).
- Swanson, Peggy. "Trial Looms Large in Technique," St. Louis Post Dispatch, (November 2, 1967).
- "Craftsmen of the Central States," Craft Horizon, (November–December 1962).
- "Young Americans '62," Craft Horizon, (July–August 1962).
