= Group work =

Voluntary association of members for a cooperative goal

Group work is a form of voluntary association of members benefiting from cooperative learning, that enhances the total output of the activity than when done individually. It aims to cater for individual differences, and develop skills such as communication skills, collaborative skills, critical thinking skills, etc. It is also meant to develop generic knowledge and socially acceptable attitudes. Through group work, a "group mind" - conforming to standards of behavior and judgement - can be fostered.

Specifically in psychotherapy and social work, "group work" refers to group therapy, offered by a practitioner trained in psychotherapy, psychoanalysis, counseling or other relevant disciplines.

== Social group work ==
Social group work is a method of social work that enhance people's social functioning through purposeful group experiences, and to cope more effectively with personal, group or community problems (Gisela Konopka, 1963).

Social group work is a primary modality of social work in bringing about positive change. It is defined as an educational process emphasizing the development and social adjustment of an individual through voluntary association and use of this association as a means of furthering socially desirable ends. It is a psychosocial process which is concerned in developing leadership and cooperation with building on the interests of the group for a social purpose. Social group work is a method through which individuals in groups in a social agency setting are helped by a worker who guides their interaction through group activities so they may relate to others and experience growth opportunities in line with their needs and capacities of the individual, group and community development. It aims at the development of persons through the interplay of personalities in a group setting and at the creation of such group setting as provide for integrated, cooperative group action for common ends. It is also a process and a method through which group life is affected by a worker who consciously directs the interacting process towards the accomplishment of goals which are conceived in a democratic frame of reference. Its distinct characteristics lies in the fact that group work is used with group experience as a means of individual growth and development, and that the group worker is concerned in developing social responsibility and active citizenship for the improvement of democratic societies. Group work is a way to serving an individual within and through small face to face groups in order to bring about the desired change among client participants.

=== Models ===
There are four models in social group work:

- Remedial model (Vinter, R. D., 1967) – Remedial model focuses on the individuals dysfunction and utilizes the group as a context and means for altering deviant behaviour.
- Reciprocal or Mediating model (W. Schwartz, 1961) - A model based on open systems theory, humanistic psychology and existential perspective. Relationship rooted in reciprocal transactions and intensive commitment is considered critical in this model.
- Developmental model (Berustein, S. & Lowy, 1965) - A model based on Erikson's ego psychology, group dynamics and conflict theory. In this model groups are seen as having "a degree of independence and autonomy, but the dynamics of to and fro flow between them and their members, between them and their social settings, are considered crucial to their existence, viability and achievements". The connectedness (intimacy and closeness) is considered critical in this model.
- Social goals model (Gisela Konopka & Weince, 1964) - A model based on 'programming' social consciousness, social responsibility, and social change. It suggests that democratic participation with others in a group situation can promote enhancement of personal function in individuals, which in-turn can affect social change. It results in heightened self-esteem and a rise in social power for the members of the group collectively and as individuals.

== See also ==
- Social case work
