= Ontario Handweavers & Spinners =

- Formation: 1956
- Purpose: Crafts guild
- Region served: Ontario
- President: Anita Caldwell
- Website: www.ohs.on.ca

The Ontario Handweavers & Spinners (OHS) is a non-profit organization based in Ontario, Canada that helps individuals interested in the fibre crafts to communicate and develop their skills, including weaving, spinning and dying, basket makers, braiders, tablet weavers and paper makers. The OHS communicates to its members through a quarterly newsletter, Fibre Focus, provides educational programs in spinning and weaving, provides scholarships and organizes several seminars or conferences each year.

== History ==
On 8–9 April 1955 a meeting of 135 members of Ontario weaving guilds was held at the Heliconian Club. The noted New York weaver Berta Frey gave a talk and demonstrated putting on a multicolored warp. The group formed an advisory committee to look into setting up a provincial organization, leading to the foundation of the Ontario Handweavers and Spinners the next year. At the time there was increasing interest in reviving traditional craft skills.

In 1986 the Handweavers Guild of America held Convergence '86 in Toronto, Canada, its first biennial meeting outside the U.S. The conference was co-hosted by the Ontario Crafts Council and the Ontario Handweavers & Spinners. About 2,000 weavers and spinners attended the conference. By 1998 the organization had grown to over 1,000 members, in over 70 guilds within six autonomous regions in Ontario. The OHS is affiliated with the Ontario Crafts Council. Many individuals prominent in the fibre arts have graduated from OHS courses or have been associated with the OHS over the years.

== Associated guilds ==
Many local handweaving and spinning guilds in Ontario are members of the OHS, including

- Burlington Weavers and Spinners
- Cambridge Spinners and Weavers
- Etobicoke Handweavers and Spinners
- Great Pine Ridge Spinners
- Guelph Handweavers and Spinners
- Haliburton County Handweavers
- Heritage Weavers and Spinner's Guild
- Kingcrafts
- Kingston Handloom weavers and Spinners Guild
- Kitchener Waterloo Weavers' & Spinners' Guild
- Leamington District Weavers Guild
- London District Weavers and Spinners
- Mississauga Handweavers and Spinners Guild
- Niagara Handweavers and Spinners Guild
- Nottawasaga Handweavers and Spinners Guild
- Ottawa Valley Weavers' and Spinners' Guild
- Oxford Weavers and Spinners
- Peterborough Handweavers and Spinners
- Pottawatomi Guild of Spinners and Weavers of Grey and Bruce Counties
- Sarnia HandWeavers and Spinners
- Southwestern Ontario Basketry Guild
- Strathroy Pioneer Treadlers Spinners and Weavers
- Sudbury and District Weavers and Spinners Guild
- Thunder Bay Weavers Guild
- Toronto Guild
