= David Cushman Coyle =

American economist

- Born: 1887
- Died: 1969 (aged 81–82); Washington, D.C., U.S.
- Occupations: Structural engineer, economist, author
- Spouse: Doris Coyle
- Children: 2 sons, 1 daughter
- Parent(s): John Patterson Coyle; Mary Cushman

David Cushman Coyle (1887–1969) was an American structural engineer, economist, and writer. Coyle was the structural engineer of the Washington State Capitol and a prominent economic thinker during the New Deal.

== Early life ==
David Cushman Coyle was born in 1887. His parents were John Patterson Coyle, a Congregational minister, and Mary Cushman Coyle. His sister was Grace Coyle (1892–1962).

== Career ==
Coyle was a structural engineer, economist and writer. He also wrote several books on economic theory and policy, including Brass Tacks (1935) and Uncommon Sense (1945).

He engineered the concrete dome that spans the building's rotunda using a cantilevered truss system. At 287 feet in diameter, it remains the largest free-standing masonry dome in North America.

== Personal life and death ==
Coyle had two sons, and a daughter by his first wife. He was married to Doris Porter Coyle upon his death. He resided in Washington, D.C. and Cliff Island, Portland, Maine, and vacationed in Cape Porpoise, Maine. He was a member of the Cosmos Club in Washington, D.C. He died in 1969 in Washington, D.C.

== Selected works ==
- Uncommon Sense, (1936)
- America, (1941), published by National Home Library Foundation
- "Tolerance and Treason", The Yale Review, (Spring 1948)
- Conservation: An American Story of Conflict and Accomplishment, New Jersey: Rutgers University Press (1957)
- The United States Political System and How it Works, (1957)
- The United Nations and How It Works, (1965)
- Roads to a New America, (1969)
