= Madelyn van der Hoogt =

American weaver, teacher and magazine editor

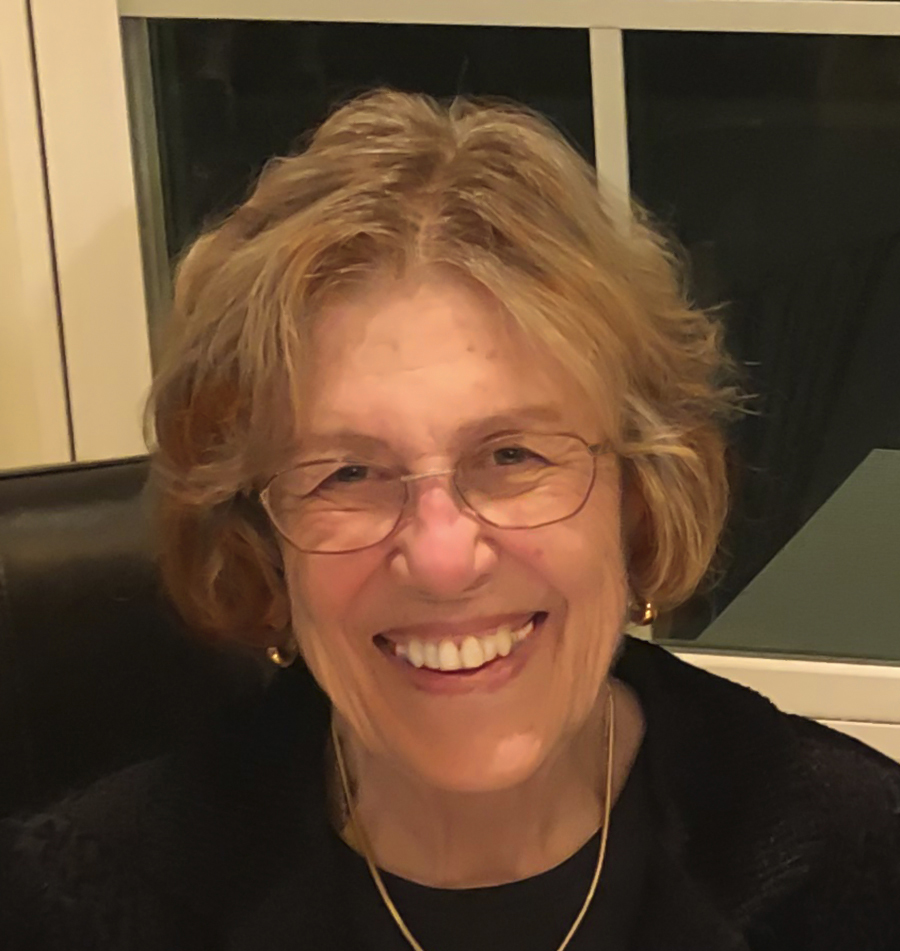
- Madelyn van der Hoogt of the Weavers' School
- Born: Madelyn Joy Sanborn; 1941
- Education: B.A. in English, University of California, Berkeley, 1963; Teaching certificate, University of California, Berkeley, 1964

Madelyn van der Hoogt (b. 1941) is an American weaver, teacher and writer who formerly edited Prairie Wool Companion, Weaver's, and Handwoven magazine.

== Early life and education ==
Born in 1941, Madelyn Joy Sanborn lived in Los Angeles, where she attended Overland Avenue Elementary School, Palms Junior High, and Alexander Hamilton High School. She earned a B.A. in English and a teaching certificate in 1963 at the University of California, Berkeley. She married Gerrit van der Hoogt in 1966.

== Career ==
Van der Hoogt taught English at Claremont Junior High and Oakland Tech in Oakland, California. The van der Hoogts moved in 1974 to Fayette, Missouri, where she taught English at Fayette High School.

In the 1970s, van der Hoogt learned to weave in Guatemala. With an interest in textiles, weaving, and looms, she edited Weaver's magazine (1986–1999) and Handwoven (1999–2012). In 1984 she established The Weavers' School in Fayette, Missouri. In 1993, van der Hoogt moved to Whidbey Island in Puget Sound with her looms and the school. Suzie Liles, of the Eugene Textile Center, became her Studio Director.

She has lectured and taught workshops for more than thirty-five years, in the United States, Canada, and Australia. In 2012, she retired from editing Handwoven magazine, to teach, weave, and write.

In naming van der Hoogt to "The Weaving Hall of Fame", Sherrie Amada Miller wrote, "She is the world's Weaving Wizard. As former editor of Prairie Wool Companion, Weaver's, and Handwoven, she has long been a star in our weaving universe."

She teaches weaving at the Weavers' School in Coupeville, Washington.

== Selected publications ==
=== Books ===
Van der Hoogt edited the Best of Weaver's Series.

- van der Hoogt, Madelyn (1993). The Complete Book of Drafting for Handweavers. Shuttle Craft Books. ISBN 0916658511.
- ——, ed. (2000). The Weaver's Companion. The Companion Series. Interweave; Companion edition. ISBN 1883010810.
- ——, ed. (2002). Fabrics That Go Bump: The Best of Weaver's. Xrx Books. ISBN 1893762114.
- ——, ed. (2006). The Magic of Doubleweave. XRX. ISBN 9781933064048.
- ——, ed. (2001). Thick 'n Thin. XRX. ISBN 1893762084.
- ——, ed. (2008). Overshot is Hot. XRX. ISBN 9781933064116.
- ——, ed. (2010). Summer & Winter Plus. XRX. ISBN 9781933064215.
- ——, ed. (2000). Huck Lace. XRX. ISBN 9781893762015.
- ——, ed. (2001). Twill Thrills. XRX. ISBN 1893762084.

=== DVDs ===
- van der Hoogt, Madelyn (2011). Weaving Well: From Yarn to Cloth. ISBN 1596686464.
- —— (2015). Weaving Overshot. Interweave. ISBN 1632500116.
- —— (2010). Warping Your Loom. Interweave. ISBN 9781596683648.
- —— (2012). Block Weaves. Interweave. ISBN 9781596686588.
- —— (2015). Weaving Deflected Doubleweave. F + W Media. ISBN 9781632505088.
- —— (2013). Weaving Lace. F + W Media. ISBN 9781620334362.
- —— (2015). Weaving Summer & Winter. F + W Media. ISBN 9781632505071.
