= Marilyn Robert =

American fiber artist and teacher (born 1946)

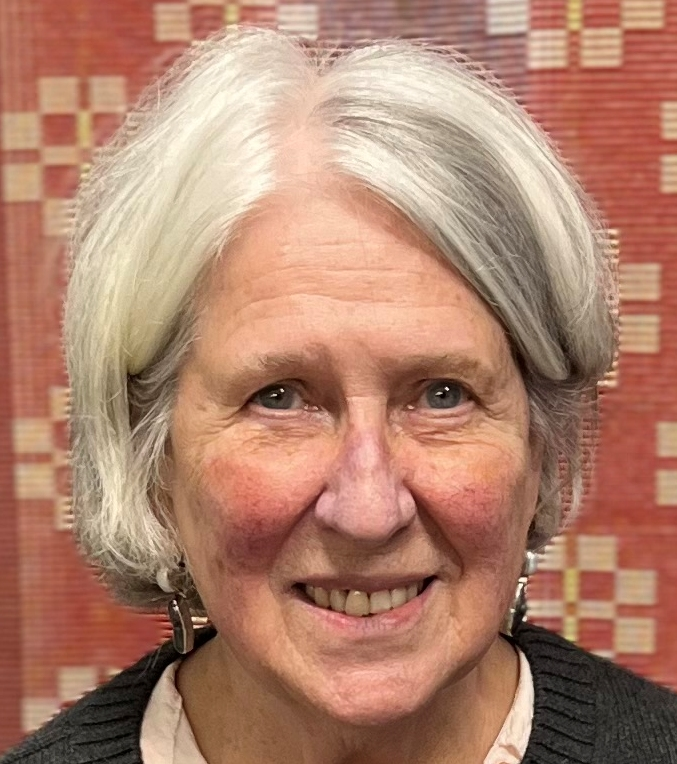
- Born: 1946 (age 79–80); Indiana
- Education: 1974 B.A. in Community Service and Public Affairs; 1974 A.D.N. in Nursing; 1990 B.A. in Fibers; 1995 M.F.A. in Fibers

Marilyn Robert (born 1946) is an American fiber artist and teacher who works in textile design and dyeing with botanical dyes. She co-founded the Eugene Textile Center with Susie Liles. Robert's teaching career since 1995 includes thirteen years as head of the Fibers program at Lane Community College, teaching textile surface design techniques and hand weaving through the Eugene Weaver's Guild, as well as faculty experience at the University of Oregon.

== Early life and education ==
The daughter of Martin and Helen (née Ernst) Robert, Marilyn Robert was born in Indiana in 1946. She is married to Larry Koenigsberg.

Robert took courses at the University of Dayton, Indiana University, and City College of New York prior to completing a B.A. in 1974 in Community Service and Public Affairs at the University of Oregon. In 1979 she also completed an Associate Degree in Nursing at Lane Community College, and was licensed as a Registered Nurse from 1978 to 2000. She earned two more degrees in Fibers at the University of Oregon: a Bachelor's degree (1990) and a Master of Fine Arts (1995).

== Career ==
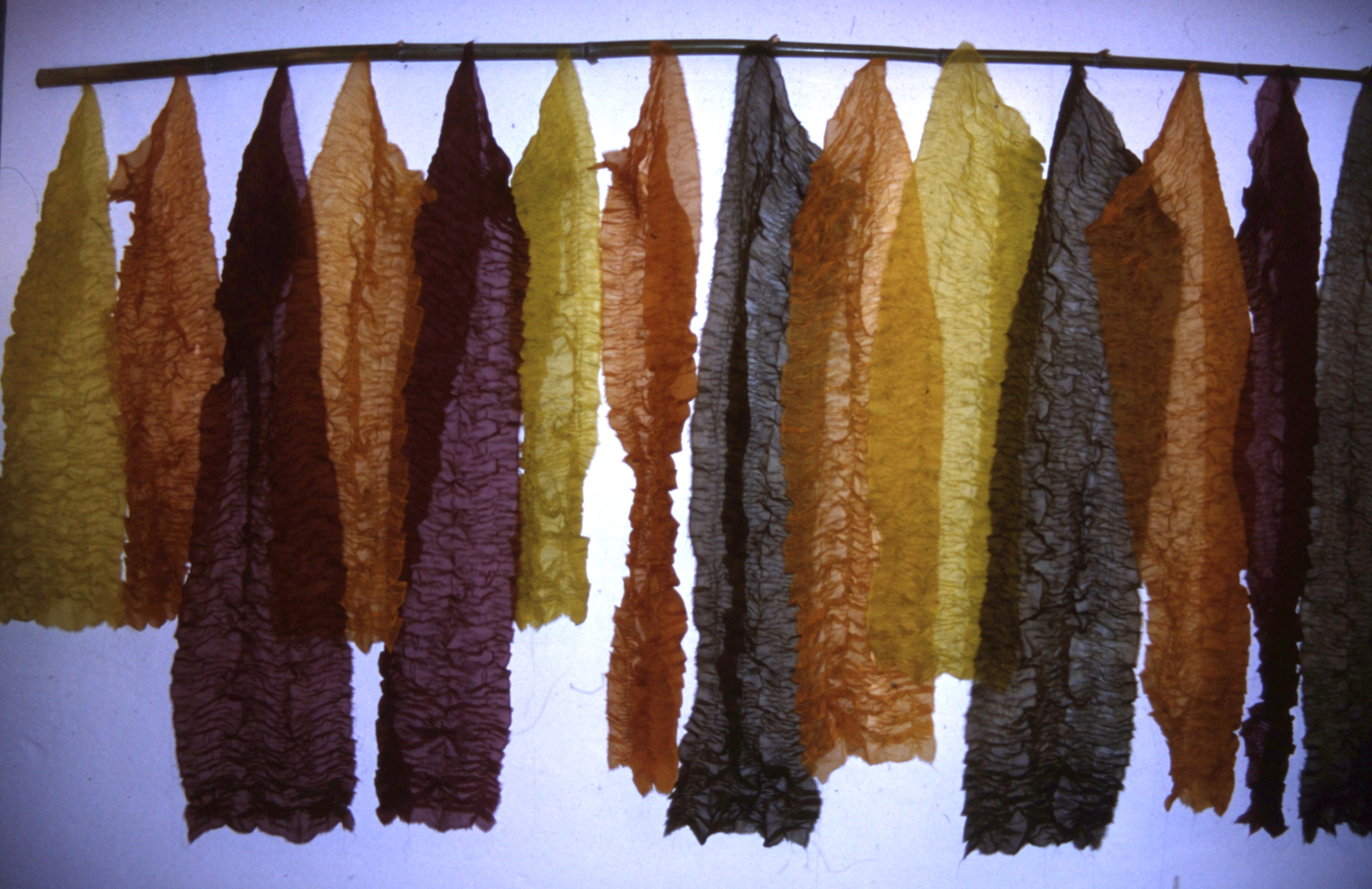
Pleated, naturally dyed silk, 2020.

Marilyn Robert has taught courses and workshops on weaving, dyeing, and textile design since 1995, including "dyeing, printing, mechanical manipulations of cloth, as well as handweaving".

Robert's 1999 installation of translucent red silk salmon at Oregon State University's Seafood Research and Education Center (SREC) in Astoria was commissioned through Oregon's Percent for Art in Public Places Program, managed by the Oregon Arts Commission. Under the same commissioning auspices, Robert hung her translucent black and white silk Pacific Whiting installation at SREC.

From 1995 through 2007, Robert served as the Fiber Arts program director and an instructor at Lane Community College. She publicly disclosed in 2017 that she had left after sexual harassment by a colleague; college officials had not sanctioned the attacker on the grounds that it was a "he said, she said" situation. The Bureau of Labor and Industries eventually vindicated her complaint, yet her attacker faced no consequences.

Robert's international work has included travel to Japan "for study of traditional indigo-dyed textiles and contemporary fiber art", as well as organizing a 2001 textile tour to Turkey, and participation in 2012 at the First International Textile Conference in Istanbul.

Robert co-founded the Eugene Textile Center with Suzie Liles in 2008.

Robert has also led the Natural Dye and Ethnic Study Group of the Eugene Weaver's Guild, as well as other workshops, such as the "Make Do and Mend Study Group".

When you put the fiber in and bring it out, the indigo oxidizes (from exposure to the air) ... You pull out this greenish fabric, and slowly it starts to turn really blue, because of the oxidation.

— Marilyn Robert

In 2018 Robert completed a residency at PLAYA, an Oregon non-profit facility supporting "work in the arts, literature, natural sciences, and other fields of creative inquiry", located on Summer Lake in Lake County, southeast of Bend. There she collected and identified plant species for dyeing fabric, using a plant list from the Oregon Department of Fish and Wildlife.

Robert was the featured guest instructor for the 2023 Hawaiʻi Handweavers' Hui annual workshop on Ikat weaving, "a woven resist technique where threads are bound according to a pattern. The threads are then dyed leaving undyed areas where there are resist ties". Robert also said at the 2023 Association of Northwest Weavers' Guilds, "Ikat weaving remains my favorite, from designing to weaving the piece. I love the technical challenge, and also the particular aesthetic."

== Selected publications ==
- Robert, Marilyn (Spring 2022). "Review: Reiko Sudo. NUNO: Visionary Japanese Textiles" (PDF). Journal of Asian Humanities at Kyushu University. 7: 103–105. doi:10.5109/4843140.
- Robert, Marilyn (March 2021). "Book Review: The Art of Tapestry Weaving, by Rebecca Mezoff". Eugene Weavers Guild.
- Robert, Marilyn (September 2020). "Book Review: Weave A Weave, by Malin Selander". Eugene Weavers Guild.
- Robert, Marilyn (September 2020). "Book Review: Plantation Slave Weavers Remember, compiled by Mary Madison". Eugene Weavers Guild.
- Robert, Marilyn (August 2020). "Book Review: The Art and Science of Natural Dyes by Joy Boutrup and Catharine Ellis". Eugene Weavers Guild.
- Barrett, Annin; Robert, Marilyn (September 2009). "Reinventing Velvet". Fiberarts. 36 (2): 50. Archived from the original on February 14, 2020 – via EBSCO.

== Awards, honors ==
- 1995 Honorable Mention, Oregon Biennial Exhibition, Portland Art Museum
- 1995 Portland Artquake People's Choice Award
- 1996 Oregon Arts Commission Individual Artist Grant
- 1997 Japan Foundation Fellowship Artist Grant
- 1999 TapRoot Artist Grant
- 2018, The Ford Family Foundation of Roseburg, Oregon: Oregon Visual Artist Mid-Career Residency Award

== See also ==
- Fiber art
- Mathematics and fiber arts
- Hand loom weavers
