= Social work with groups =

Social work with groups represents a broad domain of direct social work practice (Garvin, Gutierrez & Galinskey, 2004). Social workers work with a variety of groups in all settings in which social work is practiced. While some have proposed that social work practice with groups reflects any and all groups within which social workers participate, other definitional parameters have been established (Garvin et al., 2004). Middleman and Wood (1990) have proposed that for practice to qualify as social work with groups four conditions must be met: the worker should focus attention on helping the group members become a system of mutual aid; the group worker must understand the role of the group process itself as the primary force responsible for individual and collective change; the group worker seeks to enhance group autonomy; the group worker helps the group members experience their groupness upon termination (Middleman & Wood, 1990). Middleman and Wood (1990) observe that social group work meets their criteria of social work with groups. They also point out that "given our definition of work with groups, therapy can be the content and can be included also, contingent upon the way in which the group as a whole and groupness are used" in accord with the identified criteria. As long as the criteria are met, structured group work "where the worker is the expert until his knowledge has been imparted to the group" could be regarded as social work with groups as well (Middleman & Wood, 1990,

== The group as the unit of social work practice ==
A common conceptualization of the small group drawn from the social work literature is as

a social system consisting of two or more persons who stand in status and role relationships with one another and possessing a set of norms or values which regulate the attitudes and behaviors of the individual members in matters of consequence to the group. A group is a statement of relationship among person. Therefore, social systems have structure and some degree of stability, interaction, reciprocity, interdependence and group bond. Open social systems do not exist in a vacuum; they are part of and transact with ... their surroundings ... (Klein, 1972, pp. 125–126)

For Schwartz (1971), the group was most simply, "a collection of people who need each other in order to work on certain common tasks, in an agency hospitable to those tasks" (p. 7)

== Evolution of social group work in the United States ==
=== Pre-1930s ===
Social group work and group psychotherapy have primarily developed along parallel paths. Where the roots of contemporary group psychotherapy are often traced to the group education classes of tuberculosis patients conducted by Joseph Pratt in 1906, the exact birth of social group work can not be easily identified (Kaiser, 1958; Schleidlinger, 2000; Wilson, 1976). Social group work approaches are rooted in the group activities of various social agencies that arose in the latter part of the 19th century and the early years of the 20th century. Social upheaval and new found demands as a result of post Civil War industrialization, migration and immigration created many individual and societal needs (Brown, 1991; Kaiser, 1958; Middleman, 1968; Reid, 1991; Schwartz, 1977; Wilson, 1976). Some of these needs were met through group work endeavors found in settlement houses as well as religious and charity organizations (Middleman, 1968; Wilson, 1976). Additionally group work could be found in the progressive education movement (Dewey, 1910), the play and recreation movement (Boyd, 1935), informal education, camping and youth service organizations invested in 'character building' (Alissi, 1980; Schwartz, 1977; Williamson, 1929; Wilson, 1976).

As Clara Kaiser (1958) has indicated there have been numerous philosophical and theoretical influences on the development of social group work. Chief amongst these influences are the ethics of Judeo-Christian religions; the settlement house movement's charitable and humanitarian efforts; theories eminent in progressive education, especially those of John Dewey (1910); sociological theories about the nature of the relationship between man and society, i.e. Mead (1934); the democratic ethic articulated by early social philosophers; the psychoanalytic theories of Rank and Freud; the practice wisdom, theory building, educational and research efforts of early social group workers (Alissi, 1980; Kaiser, 1958; Wilson, 1976). Early theoretical, research and practice efforts of Grace Coyle (1930, 1935, 1937, 1947, 1948), Wilber Newstetter (1935), and Neva Boyd (1935) paved the way for the advancement and development of social group work.

In the summer of 1934 Grace Coyle organized a two-week group work institute for forty YWCA and settlement house workers at Fletcher Farm, Vermont (Alissi, 1980, p. 16). Coyle presented an early theoretical framework for social group work articulating the need for a democratic value base (Coyle, 1935), identifying the role of the worker as a group builder (Coyle, 1937) and noting the benefits of 'esprit de corps' or group morale (Coyle, 1930). As the editor of several small group research compendiums Hare (1976) would later point out, "many of her insights about group process were ahead of her time" (p. 388).

=== The mid-thirties to the 1950s ===
Social group work was introduced to the social work profession when it made its debut at the National Conference for Social Work in 1935. At this conference, Newsletter (1935) introduced the concept of social group work to the social work profession and identified group work as a field, process and set of techniques. He described group work as an "educational process" concerned with "the development and social adjustment of an individual through voluntary group association" and "the use of this association as a means of furthering other socially desirable ends" (p. 291).

The period of time between the 1930s and the 1950s was one of growth and expansion for social group work (Alissi, 1980; Wilson, 1976). The economic despair of and varied psychosocial needs resultant of the Great Depression paved the way for greater affiliation between the social work profession and the field of group work (Alissi, 1980; Konopka, 1983; Wilson, 1976). The psychological needs of returning war veterans who served in World War II resulted in the more frequent application of social group work in psychiatric treatment (Konopka, 1983). During this period of time not only would the field of social group work debut at the National Conference for Social Work but additional advances would be made. Academic courses and research institutions were established; a professional organization was formed, The American Association of Social Work with Groups (AAGW); and a journal, The Group, was established. The first textbooks would appear as well, written by Harleigh Trecker (1948) and Gertrude Wilson and Gladys Ryland (1949).

The 1950s would usher in even greater affiliation of group work with the profession of social work (Alissi, 1980; Andrews, 2001). The merger of the AAGW with six other organizations to form the National Association of Social Work (NASW) in 1955 solidified the identification and integration of social group work with the social work profession (Alissi, 1980; Andrews, 2001). The impact of the merger was reflected in efforts at definitional shifts regarding group work.

In 1956 the NASW formed a group work section which issued a new definition that contrasted in focus with that proposed by the AAGW. The new definition dismissed the idea of group work with normal growth and development and instead saw group work as a

service to a group where the primary purpose is to help members improve social adjustment, and the secondary purpose is to help the group achieve objectives approved by society…the definition assumes that the members have adjustment problems. (Alissi, 1980, p. 24)

Less than one fifth of the group work section agreed with this definition at the time (Alissi, 1980). The ensuing tensions regarding the defining parameters of social group work lead to a reconceptualization that included recognition that there existed different models to be used for different purposes (Hartford, 1964; Papell & Rothman, 1966).

=== The 1960s to the present ===
The 1960s and the 1970s saw the expansion of the social welfare state; the Vietnam War; the emergence of the War on Poverty; the Woman's Rights Movement; the Black Power Movement; and the Lesbian and Gay Rights Movement (Balgopal & Vassil, 1983; Somers, 1976). The above social, intellectual and cultural factors influenced the social work profession including social group work (Balgopal & Vassil, 1983; Somers, 1976). With such a wide range of social and therapeutic needs there seemed to be an even greater appreciation of group work (Balgopal & Vassil, 1983; Hartford, 1964; Somers, 1976). Having expanded into differing practice settings, the purposes and goals of group work had been more broadly described at this juncture than in previous decades.

Group work scholars made great strides in developing practice theories. The work of Vinter and Schwartz and their respective associates would dominate the group work scene for much of this decade and the next (Galinsky & Schopler, 1974). In Vinter's approach (1967) the treatment group is thought of as a small social system "whose influences can be planfully guided to modify client behavior" (p. 4). In this approach the worker takes a central position in providing treatment, interventions are planned, group process is highly structured, and great emphasis is given to outcome evaluation and research (Vinter, 1967; Garvin, 1987; Galinsky & Schopler, 1974). Schwartz (1961) proposed his vision of the small group as an enterprise in mutual aid.

In 1965 Bernstein and colleagues introduced another social group work practice theory (Bernstein, 1978; Lowy, 1978; Garland, Kolodney & Jones, 1978). The centerpiece of the edited collection was a developmental stage model, known as the Boston Model, which presented a framework for understanding how groups navigate degrees of emotional closeness over time (Bernstein, 1978; Garland, Kolodney & Jones, 1978). In 1966 Papell and Rothman (1966) presented a typology of social group work that included the social goals model (in the tradition of Coyle), the remedial model (as developed by Vinter) and the reciprocal model (as articulated by Schwartz). In 1968 Middleman (1968) made a seminal contribution in articulating an approach to group work practice that utilized non-verbal activities. In 1976 Roberts and Northen presented a collection of ten group work practice theories (Roberts & Northen, 1976) further illustrating the diversity of approaches to group practice.

As theory building proliferated there was a simultaneous effort to distill the essential elements of social group work. In 1980 Papell and Rothman wrote, "The process of distilling and identifying the central identity of group work in the contemporary period has already begun" (p. 7). In adopting the phrase, the Mainstream Model of Social Work with Groups, Papell and Rothman conferred their agreement with Lang (1979) that there existed a "mainstream of social work practice with groups" (p. 209). Papell and Rothman suggested the essential characteristics of the mainstream model were "common goals, mutual aid, and non-synthetic experiences" (1980, p. 7).

The late seventies saw the reemergence of a professional journal, Social Work with Groups in 1978. Additionally, in 1978 social group workers formed a committee to host a symposium in honor of Grace Coyle which paved the way for an annual conference in subsequent years (Northen & Kurland, 2001). The conference planning committee was transformed into the membership driven organization, The Association for the Advancement of Social Work with Groups now an international organization (AASWG, 2006).

Contemporary group work practice continues to be informed by the work of early pioneers and the vanguards of the 1960s and 1970s. In addition to the Mutual Aid Model of social work with groups, the Cognitive-Behavioral Group Work Model is recognized as influential on contemporary group work practice (Rose, 2004). The approach suggested by Rose (1989, 2004) integrates cognitive and behavioral interventions with small group strategies. While primacy is not placed on establishing the group as a mutual aid system in quite the same way as with the Mutual Aid Model, Rose (2004) suggests the worker promote group discussion and member interaction. Furthermore, drawing upon Yalom's Therapeutic Factor construct Rose (2004) points out the benefits of universality, altruism, and group cohesion as well as mutual reinforcement, factors which are conceptually resonant with mutual aid.

== Purpose ==
In 1964 the Committee on Practice of the Group Work Section of the National Association of Social Workers proposed that group work was applicable for the following purposes: corrective/treatment; prevention; normal social growth and development; personal enhancement; and citizenship indoctrination (Hartford, 1964). Common needs addressed by social work groups include coping with major life transitions; the need to acquire information or skills; the need to improve social relationships; and the need to cope with illness; and the need to cope with feelings of loss or loneliness; amongst other reasons (Gitterman & Shulman, 2005; Northen & Kurland, 2001).

== Guiding values ==
Northen and Kurland (2001) identify the value system informing group work practice with "the ultimate value of social work" which they suggest is "that human beings have opportunities to realize their potential for living in ways that are both personally satisfying and socially desirable" (p. 15). Humanistic values guide social work practice with groups, inform worker role and use of self, and the understanding of membership in a social work group. Humanistic values "cast people in society as responsible for and to one another" (Glassman & Kates, 1990, p. 13). The perspective espoused by several social work group work experts is that not only are people responsible for one another but that mutual interdependence is preferable to individualism (Falck, 1989; Getzel, 1978; Glassman & Kates, 1990; Northen & Kurland, 2001; Schwartz, 1961; Shulman, 2006; Steinberg, 2004).

The following humanistic values have been highlighted by social work educators, such as Gisela Konopka, as integral to social work practice with groups: 1) "individuals are of inherent worth"; 2) "people are mutually responsible for each other; and 3) "people have the fundamental right to experience mental health brought about by social and political conditions that support their fulfillment" (Glassman & Kates, 1990, p. 14).

Democratic norms of group participation which flow from humanistic values are actively shaped by group workers as they promote cooperation and "fluid distribution of position, power and resources" (Glassman & Kates, 1990, p. 14).

== Primary rationale for group services in social work ==
Opportunities for mutual aid to be found in the group encounter offer the major rationale for the provision of group services by social workers. Gitterman (2006), a social work educator and group work scholar has elaborated on the role of mutual aid in the small group noting that "as members become involved with one another, they develop helping relationships and become invested in each other and in participating in the group" (p. 93). The mutual aid processes that unfold help group members "to experience their concerns and life issues as universal," to "reduce isolation and stigma," to "offer and receive help from each other," and to "learn from each other's views, suggestions and challenges" (Gitterman, 2006, p. 93).

Not only do group services offer opportunities for social support as Toseland and Siporin (1986) explain "there is also an important helper therapy principle that operates in groups" (p. 172). Toseland and Siporin (1986) elaborate: "clients are able to help others and in so doing receive help for themselves" (p. 172).

== Mutual aid ==
Mutual aid as group work technology can be understood as an exchange of help wherein the group member is both the provider as well as the recipient of help in service of achieving common group and individual goals (Borkman, 1999; Gitterman, 2006; Lieberman, 1983; Northen & Kurland, 2001; Schwartz, 1961; Shulman, 2006, Steinberg, 2004; Toseland & Siporin, 1986). The rationale for cultivating mutual aid in the group encounter is premised on mutual aid's resonance with humanistic values and the following propositions: 1) members have strengths, opinions, perspectives, information, and experiences that can be drawn upon to help others in the group; 2) helping others helps the helper, a concept known as the helper-therapy principle (Reissman, 1965) which has been empirically validated (Roberts et al., 1999); and 3) some types of help, such as confrontation, are better received when emanating from a peer rather than the worker (Shulman, 2006).

Mutual aid is often erroneously understood as simply the exchange of support. Mutual aid is better conceptualized as multidimensional with at least 10 types of processes or activities that occur amongst and between members, including: sharing data, the dialectic process, discussion of taboo topics, the all in the same boat phenomenon, developing a universal perspective, mutual support, mutual demand (including confrontation), rehearsal of new skills, individual problem solving, and the strengths in numbers phenomenon (Gitterman, 2004; Shulman, 2006; Steinberg, 2004).

== Practice models ==
=== The mutual aid model ===
The Mutual Aid Model of group work practice (Gitterman, 2004) has its roots in the practice theory proposed by William Schwartz (1961) which was introduced in the article, "The Social Worker in the Group". Schwartz (1961) envisioned the group as an "enterprise in mutual aid, an alliance of individuals who need each other in varying degrees, to work on certain common problems" (p. 266). Schwartz elaborated:

the fact is that this is a helping system in which clients need each other as well as the worker. This need to use each other, to create not one but many helping relationships, is a vital ingredient of the group process and constitutes a need over and above the specific tasks for which the group was formed. (1961, p. 266)

While referred to as social group work (Papell & Rothman,1966), Schwartz preferred to think of this model as social work with groups (Schwartz, 1976). Schwartz (1976) regarded this approach as resonant with the demands of a variety of group types including, natural and formed; therapeutic and task; open and closed; and voluntary and mandatory. Schwartz (1961, 1964) initially thought of this approach as an organic systems model (as he viewed the group as an organic whole) later to refer to it as the mediating model and then the interactionist model (Schwartz, 1977). The model initially proposed by Schwartz has been further developed most notably by Lawrence Shulman and Alex Gitterman, who have since referred to this model as the Mutual Aid Model (Gitterman, 2004, 2005; Shulman, 1979, 1992, 1999, 2005b).

=== Cognitive-behavioral group work ===
The Cognitive-Behavioral Group Work Model is recognized as influential contemporary group work practice approach (Rose, 2004). The approach suggested by Rose (1989, 2004) integrates cognitive and behavioral interventions with small group strategies. While primacy is not placed on establishing the group as a mutual aid system in quite the same way as with the Mutual Aid Model, Rose (2004) suggests the worker promote group discussion and member interaction. Furthermore, drawing upon Yalom's Therapeutic Factor construct Rose (2004) points out the benefits of universality, altruism, and group cohesion as well as mutual reinforcement, factors which are conceptually resonant with mutual aid.

== Special considerations ==
=== Group work with mandated members ===
The involuntary client can be understood as someone who is pressured by some external source to seek social services (Rooney and Chovanec, 2004). Mandated involuntary clients are pressured to seek services as a result of the legal system (Rooney & Chovanec, 2004). Rooney and Chovanec (2004) identify reactance theory as an explanatory framework for the attitude and behaviors of the involuntary client and the mandated involuntary client. Reactance theory suggests that as a person is pressured to relinquish certain behaviors as a result of treatment efforts they experience reactance, "a motivational drive to restore those free behaviors" (Rooney & Chovanec, 2004, p. 213). Rooney and Chovanec (2004) suggest an approach that draws upon the Transtheoretical (Stages of Change) Model and Motivational Interviewing in identifying strategies for engaging involuntary clients in the group process. Tom Caplan (2008) suggests the Needs ABC Model.

Behroozi (1992) has noted tensions between the concept of working with mandated clients and professional ethics, such as the belief in fostering self-determination. The chief concern is whether or not "involuntary applicants" are in fact "clients", as to become a client of a professional social worker requires "mutual agreement" (Behroozi, 1992, p. 224). In social work practice, the primary task given this issue is to help the applicant "transform to clienthood" (Behroozi, 1992, p. 224). In the absence of this transformation, the mandated "client" is likely to be superficially compliant and deny they have any problems warranting social work attention (Behroozi, 1992; Breton, 1993; Milgram & Rubin, 1992).

=== Open-ended groups ===
Most conceptualizations of group development are predicated on the belief that the group is closed, with unchanging membership (Schopler & Galinsky, 1990). The findings of an exploratory study conducted by Schopler and Galinsky (1990) concluded that movement beyond beginnings is possible. However, the impact of open membership is likely to result in a more cyclical pattern of group development with regression occurring when members enter and/or leave the group (Schopler & Galinsky, 1990).

As a concept, open-endedness exists along a continuum dependent upon the duration of the group (Gitterman, 1989; Schopler and Galinsky, 1995a; Shulman, 2006). When membership is open but the group is of a long duration a core group of members is likely to emerge (Schopler and Galinsky, 1995a; Shulman, 1999, 2006). When this occurs the core group assumes responsibilities for indoctrinating new members (Gitterman, 1989; Schopler & Galinsky, 1995a; Shulman, 1999).

== See also ==
- Group work § Social group work

== References and further reading ==
Textbooks

- Balgopal, P.R. and Vassil, T.V. (1983). Groups in social work: An ecological perspective. New York: Macmillan Publishing Company, Inc.
- Brown, L. (1991). Groups for growth and change. New York: Longman.
- Caplan, T. (2008). "Needs-ABC: A Needs Acquisition and Behavior Change Model for Group Work and Other Psychotherapies." London: Whiting & Birch.
- Garvin, C. (1997). Contemporary group work (Third edition). Boston: Allyn and Bacon
- Glassman, U. and Kates, L. (1990). Group work: A humanistic approach. Newbury Park, CA: SAGE Publications, Inc.
- Henry, S. (1992). Group skills in social work: A four-dimensional approach (2cnd edition). Belmont, CA: Brooks/Cole Publishing Company.
- Hartford, M. (1971). Groups in social work. New York: Columbia University Press.
- Klein, A. (1970). Social work through group process. New York: School of Social Welfare, State University of New York at Albany.
- Konopka, G. (1983). Social group work: A helping process (3rd edition). Englewood Cliffs, NJ: Prentice-Hall, Inc.
- Northen, H. (1969). Social work with groups. New York: Columbia University Press.
- Northen, H. (1988). Social work with groups (2cnd Edition). New York: Columbia University Press.
- Northen, H. and Kurland, R. (2001). Social work with groups (3rd edition). New York: Columbia University Press.
- Phillips, H.U. (1957). Essentials of social group work skill. New York: Association Press.
- Reid, K. Social work practice with groups: A clinical perspective (Second Edition). Pacific Grove, CA: Brooks/Cole Publishing.
- Rose, S. (1989). Working with adults in groups: Integrating cognitive-behavioral and small group strategies. San Francisco, CA: Jossey-Bass Publishers.
- Shulman, L. (1979). The skills of helping individuals and groups. Itasca, Ill: Peacock Publishers.
- Shulman, L. (1992). The skills of helping: Individuals, families, groups, and communities (3rd edition). Itasca, IL: Peacock.
- Shulman, L. (1999). The skills of helping: Individuals, families, groups, and communities (4th ed.). Itasca, IL: Peacock.
- Shulman, L. (2006). The skills of helping individuals, families, groups, and communities (Fifth edition). Belmont. CA: Thompson.
- Steinberg, D.M. (1997). The mutual–aid approach to working with groups: Helping people to help each other. Northvale, NJ: Aronson.
- Steinberg, D.M. (2004). The mutual–aid approach to working with groups: Helping people to help each other (second edition). New York: The Haworth Press.
- Toseland, R.W. and Rivas, R.F. (2005). Introduction to group work practice (5th edition). New York: Allyn & Bacon.
- Trecker, H. (1948). Social group work: Principles and practices. New York: The Women's Press.
- Trecker, H. (1955). Social group work: Principles and practices, (2cnd ed.) New York: Association Press.
- Wasserman, H. and Danforth, H.E. (1988). The human bond: Support groups and mutual aid. New York: Springer Publishing Company.
- Wilson, G. and Ryland, G. (1949). Social group work practice: The creative use of the social process. Boston: Houghton Mifflin Company.

Orienting knowledge

- Anderson, J.D. (1979). Social work with groups in the generic base of social work practice. Social Work with Groups, 2(4), 281–293.
- Anderson, J.D. (1985). Working with groups: Little-known facts that challenge well- known myths. Small Group Behavior, 16(3), 267–283.
- Association for the Advancement of Social Work with Groups, Inc. (2006). Standards for social work practice with groups (2cnd Edition). Alexandria, VA: Author.
- Breton, M. (1990). Learning from social group work tradition. Social Work with Groups, 13(3), 21–34.
- Breton, M. (2004). An empowerment perspective. In C. Garvin, L. Gutierrez, and M. Galinsky (Eds.), Handbook of social work with groups (pp. 58–75). New York and London: The Guilford Press.
- Cohen, N. (1944/1952). Group work in its broader implications. In D. Sullivan (ed.) Readings in group work (pp. 197–199). New York: Association Press.
- Coyle, G.L. (1930). Social process in organized groups. New York: Smith.
- Coyle, G.L. (1935). Group work and social change. In Proceedings of the National Conference on Social Work (pp. 393–405). Chicago: University of Chicago Press.
- Coyle, G.L. (1944/1952). Not all group activities are group work. In D. Sullivan (ed.) Readings in group work (pp. 200–202). New York: Association Press.
- Coyle, G.L. (1947). Group experience and democratic values. New York: The Woman's Press.
- Coyle, G.L. (1948). Group work with American youth. New York: Harper and Bros.
- Coyle, G.L. (1948/1952). Definition of group work. In D. Sullivan (ed.) Readings in group work (pp. 420–421). New York: Association Press.
- Dewey, J. (1910). How we think. Boston: D.C. Heath and Co.
- Falck, H.S. (1989). The management of membership: social group work contributions. Social Work with Groups, 12(3), 19–32.
- Freire, P. (1970). Pedagogy of the oppressed. New York: Continuum.
- Galinsky, M. and Schopler, J.H. (1977). Warning: groups may be dangerous. Social Work, March, 89–94.
- Gitterman, A. (1989). Building mutual support in groups. Social Work with Groups, 12(2), 5–22.
- Gitterman, A. (2004). The mutual aid model. In C. Garvin, L. Gutierrez, and M. Galinsky (Eds.), Handbook of social work with groups (pp. 93–110). New York and London: The Guilford Press.
- Hartford, M. (1964/1980). Frames of reference for social group work. In A. Alissi (ed.) Perspectives on social group work practice: A book of readings (pp. 64–71). New York: The Free Press.
- Hartford, M. (1976). Group methods and generic practice. In R. W. Roberts and H. Northen (Eds.) Theories of social work with groups (pp. 45–74). New York: Columbia University Press.
- Hartford, M. (1978). Groups in the human services: Some facts and fancies. Social Work with Groups, 1(1), 7–13.
- Kaiser, C. (1958). The social group work process. Social Work, 3(2), 67–75.
- Kropotkin, P. (1903). Mutual aid: A factor of evolution. McLean, Virginia: IndyPublish.com.
- Kurland, R. and Salmon, R. (1992). Group work vs. casework in a group: Principles and implications for teaching and practice. Social Work with Groups, 15(4), 3–14.
- Lang, N. (1979). A comparative examination of therapeutic uses of groups in social work and in adjacent human service professions: Part II-The literature from 1969 to 1978. Social Work with Groups, 2(3), 197–220.
- Lang, N. (2004). Concurrent interventions in multiple domains: The essence of social work with groups. Social Work with Groups, 27(1), 35–52.
- Lee, J. and Swenson, C. (2005). Mutual aid: a buffer against risk. In A. Gitterman and L. Shulman (Eds.) Mutual aid groups, vulnerable and resilient populations, and the life cycle (3rd Edition) (pp. 573–596). New York: Columbia University Press.
- Lowy, L. (1978). Decision-making and group work. In S. Bernstein (ed.) Explorations in Group Work (pp. 107–136). Hebron, CT: Practitioner's Press.
- Mead, G.H. (1934). Mind, self and society: From the standpoint of a social behaviorist. Chicago, IL: The University of Chicago Press.
- Middleman, R.R. (1968). The non-verbal method in working with groups. New York: Association Press.
- Middleman, R.R. (1978). Returning group process to group work. Social Work with Groups, 1(1), 15–26.
- Middleman, R.R. and Wood, G.G. (1990a). From social group work to social work with groups. Social Work with Groups, 14(3/4), 75–86.
- Papell, C. and Rothman, B. (1966). Social group work models: Possession and heritage. Journal of Education for Social Work, 6(2), 66–77.
- Pistole, M.C. (1997). Attachment theory: Contributions to group work. The Journal of Specialists in Group Work, 22(1), 7–21.
- Riessman, F. (1965). The Helper Therapy Principle. Social Work, 10, April, 27–32.
- Roberts, R.W. and Northen, H. (Eds.) (1976). Theories of social work with groups. New York: Columbia University Press.
- Roffman, R. (2004). Psychoeducational groups. In C. Garvin, L. Gutierrez, and M. Galinsky (Eds.), Handbook of social work with groups (pp. 160–175). New York and London: The Guilford Press.
- Rose, S. (1990). Putting the group into cognitive-behavioral treatment. Social Work with Groups, 13(3), 71–83.
- Rose, S. (2004). Cognitive-behavioral group work. In C. Garvin, L. Gutierrez, and M. Galinsky (Eds.), Handbook of social work with groups (pp. 111–136). New York and London: The Guilford Press.
- Schopler, J.H. and Galinsky, M.J. (1995). Group practice overview. In R.L. Edwards (ed.), Encyclopedia of Social Work (19th Edition), 2:1129–1142. Washington, D.C.: NASW Press.
- Schwartz, W. (1959/1994). Group work and the social scene. In T. Berman-Rossi (ed.). Social Work: The collected writings of William Schwartz (pp. 202–220). Itasca, Ill: Peacock Publishers.
- Schwartz, W. (1961). The social worker in the group. In B. Saunders (Ed.), New perspectives on services to groups: Theory, organization, practice (pp. 7–29), New York: National Association of Social Workers.
- Schwartz, W. (1964/1994). Analysis of papers presented on working definitions of group work practice. In T. Berman-Rossi (ed.). Social Work: The collected writings of William Schwartz (pp. 310–308). Itasca, Ill: Peacock Publishers.
- Schwartz, W. (1971). On the use of groups in social work practice. In Schwartz, W. and Zalba, S. (Eds.). (1971). The practice of group work (pp. 3–24). New York: Columbia University Press.
- Schwartz, W. (1976). Between client and system: The mediating function. In R.W. Roberts and H. Northen (Eds.), Theories of social work with groups (pp. 171–197). New York: Columbia University Press.
- Schwartz, W. (1977). Social group work: The interactionist approach. In J.B. Turner (ed.) Encyclopedia of Social Work (17th Edition), 2:1328–1338. Washington, DC: National Association of Social Workers.
- Schwartz, W. (1986). The group work tradition and social work practice. In A. Gitterman and L. Shulman (Eds.), The legacy of William Schwartz: Group practice as shared interaction (pp. 7–27). New York: Haworth Press.
- Schwartz, W. (1994). Social work with groups: The search for a method (1968–1972). In T. Berman-Rossi (ed.). Social Work: The collected writings of William Schwartz (pp. 1–194). Itasca, Ill: Peacock Publishers.
- Schwartz, W. and Zalba, S. (Eds.). (1971). The practice of group work. New York: Columbia University Press.
- Shalinsky, W. (1983). One-session meetings: Aggregate or group? Small Group Behavior, 14(4), 495–514.
- Shapiro, B. (1990). Mutual helping: A neglected theme. In A. Katz and E. Bender (Eds.). Helping One Another: Self-help groups in a changing world (pp. 169–182). Oakland, CA: Third Party Publishing Company.
- Shulman, L. (1986). The dynamics of mutual aid. In A. Gitterman and L. Shulman (Eds.), The legacy of William Schwartz: Group practice as shared interaction (pp. 51–60). New York: Haworth Press.
- Shulman, L. (2005b). Group work method. In A. Gitterman and L. Shulman (Eds.) Mutual aid groups, vulnerable and resilient populations, and the life cycle (3rd Edition) (pp. 38–72). New York: Columbia University Press.
- Simmel, G. (1950/1969). The dyad and the triad. In L. Coser and B. Rosenberg (Eds.) Sociological theory: A book of readings (pp. 59–68). New York: The Macmillan Company.
- Toseland, R.W., Jones, L., and Gellis, Z. (2004). Group dynamics. In C. Garvin, L. Gutierrez, and M. Galinsky (Eds.), Handbook of social work with groups (pp. 13–31). New York and London: The Guilford Press.
- Tropp, E. (1965). Group work practice. Journal of Jewish Communal Service, 16(3),229–250.
- Tropp, E. (1977a). Social group work: The developmental approach. . In J.B. Turner (ed.) Encyclopedia of Social Work (17th Edition), 2:1321–1328. Washington, DC: National Association of Social Workers.
- Tropp, E. (1977b). A humanistic foundation for group work practice (second edition). Richmond, VA: Virginia Commonwealth University.
- Vinter, R.D. (Ed.). (1967). Readings in group work practice. Ann Arbor, MI: Campus

History of social group work

- Alissi, A. (1980). Social group work: Commitments and perspectives. In A. Alissi (Ed.), Perspectives on social group work practice: A book of readings (pp. 5–33). New York: Free Press.
- Andrews, J. (2001). Group work's place in social work: a historical analysis. Journal of Sociology and Social Welfare. Retrieved October 29, 2005 at www.findarticles.com/p/articles.
- Breton, M. (1990). Learning from social group work tradition. Social Work with Groups, 13(3), 21–34.
- Williamson, M. (1929). The social worker in group work. New York and London: Harper and Brothers.
- Wilson, G. (1976). From practice to theory: A personalized history. In R. W. Roberts and H. Northen (Eds.) Theories of social work with groups (pp. 1–44). New York: Columbia University Press.

Handbooks and edited collections

- Berman-Rossi, T. (1994). Social Work: The collected writings of William Schwartz. Itasca, Ill: Peacock Press.
- Garvin, C., Gutierrez, L., and Galinsky, M. (Eds.). (2004). Handbook of social work with groups. New York and London: The Guilford Press.
- Gitterman, A. and Shulman, L. (Editors) (2005). Mutual aid groups, vulnerable & resilient populations, and the life cycle (3rd edition). New York: Columbia University Press.
- Roberts, R.W. and Northen, H. (Eds.) (1976). Theories of social work with groups. New York: Columbia University Press.
- Sullivan, D. (Ed.). (1952). Readings in group work. New York: Association Press.
- Sundel, M., Glasser, P., Sarri, R., and Vinter, R. (Eds.) (1985). Individual change through small groups (2nd edition). New York: The Free Press.
- Trecker, H. (Ed.) (1955). Group work: Foundations and frontiers. Hebron, Connecticut: Practitioner's Press, Inc.
- Vinter, R.D. (Ed.). (1967). Readings in group work practice. Ann Arbor, MI: Campus

Ethics and values

- Getzel, G. (1978). A value base for interactionist practice: a proposal. The Social Worker, 46(4), 116–120.
- Gumpert, J. and Black, P. (2006). Ethical issues in group work: What are they? How are they managed? Social Work with Groups, 29(4), 93–99.
- Konopka, G. (1978). The significance of social group work based on ethical values. Social Work with Groups, 1(2), 123–131.
- Northen, H. (2004). Ethics and values in group work. In C. Garvin, L. Gutierrez, and M. Galinsky (Eds.), Handbook of social work with groups (pp. 76–90). New York and London: The Guilford Press.

Stage theory

- Bennis, W.G. and Shepherd, H.A. (1956). A theory of group development. Human Relations, 9, 415–437.
- Berman-Rossi, T. (1992). Empowering groups through understanding stages of group development. Social Work with Groups, 15(2/3), 239–255.
- Berman-Rossi, T. (1993). The tasks and skills of the social worker across stages of group development. Social Work with Groups, 16(1/2), 69–82.
- Garland, J.A., Jones, H.E., and Kolodney, R.L. (1978). A model for stages of development in social work groups. In S. Bernstein (Ed.) Explorations in Group Work (pp. 17–71). Hebron, CT: Practitioners Press.
- Schiller, L.Y. (1995). Stages of developing women's groups: a relational group model. In R. Kurland and R. Salmon (eds.) Group work practice in a troubled society: Problems and opportunities. New York, NY: Haworth Press.
- Schopler, J.H. and Galinsky, M.J. (1990). Can open-ended groups move beyond beginnings? Small Group Research, 21(4), 435–449.
- Tuckman, B.W. (1965). Developmental sequence in small groups. Psychological Bulletin, 63(6), 384–399.
- Tuckman, B.W. and Jensen, M.A.C. (1977). Stages of small-group development revisited. Group and Organization Studies, 2(4), 419–427.

Middles

- Bernstein, S. (1978). Conflict and group work. In S. Bernstein (Ed.), Explorations in group work (pp. 72–106). Boston: Milford House.
- Somers, M.L. (1976). Problem-solving in small groups. In R. W. Roberts and H. Northen (Eds.) Theories of social work with groups (pp. 268–303). New York: Columbia University Press.

Endings

- Birnbaum, M. and Cicchetti, A. (2000). The power of purposeful sessional endings in each group encounter. Social Work with Groups, 23(3), 37–52.
- Birnbaum, M., Mason, S. and Cicchetti, A. (2002). Impact of purposeful sessional endings on both the group and the practitioner. Social Work with Groups, 25(4), 3–19.

Contrasts between group work and group therapy/psychotherapy

- Middleman, R.R. and Wood, G.G. (1990a). From social group work to social work with groups. Social Work with Groups, 14(3/4), 75–86.
- Papell, C. and Rothman, B. (1980). Relating the mainstream model of social work with groups to group psychotherapy and the structured group approach. Social Work with Groups, 3(2), 5–22.
- Reid, K. Social work practice with groups: A clinical perspective (Second Edition). Pacific Grove, CA: Brooks/Cole Publishing.
- Scheidlinger, S. (2000). Group psychotherapy and related helping groups today: An overview. American Journal of Psychotherapy, 58(3), 265–280.

Group work research, evaluation, and empirical evidence

- Boyd, N. (1935). Group work experiments in state institutions. In Proceedings of the National Conference on Social Work (pp. 339–345). Chicago: University of Chicago Press.
- Coyle, G.L. (Ed.). (1937). Studies in group behavior. New York: Harper.
- Garrett, K. (2005). Best practices in group work: Assessment and monitoring of group processes. Paper presented at the 27th International Symposium for the Association for the Advancement of Social Work with Groups, October, 2005.
- Macgowan, M. (1997). A measure of engagement for social group work: The groupwork engagement measure. Journal of Social Service Research, 23(2), 17–37.
- Magen, R. (2004). Measurement issues. In C. Garvin, L. Gutierrez, and M. Galinsky (Eds.), Handbook of social work with groups (pp. 447–460). New York and London: The Guilford Press.
- Schopler, J.H. and Galinsky, M.J. (1990). Can open-ended groups move beyond beginnings? Small Group Research, 21(4), 435–449.
- Tolman, R. M. and Molidor, C.E. (1994). A decade of social group work research: Trends in methodology, theory, and program development. Research on Social Work Practice, 4(2), 142–159.
- Toseland, R.W. and Siporin, M. (1986). When to recommend group treatment: A review of the clinical and research literature. International Journal of Group Psychotherapy, 36(2), 171–201.

Group Work teaching and education

- Birnbaum, M. and Auerbach, C. (1994). Group work in graduate social work education: The price of neglect. Journal of Social Work Education, 30(3), 325–335.
- Birnbaum, M. and Wayne, J. (2000). Group work in foundation generalist education: The necessity for curriculum change. Journal of Social Work Education, 36(2), 347–356.
- Kurland, R. and Salmon, R. (1998). Teaching a methods course in social work with groups. Alexandria, VA: Council on Social Work Education.
- Murphy, M. (1959). The social group work method in social work education. New York: Council on Social Work Education.
- Steinberg, D.M. (1992). The impact of group work education on social work practitioners' work with groups. New York, NY: City University of New York.
- Steinberg, D.M. (1993). Some findings from a study on the impact of group work education on social work practitioners' work with groups. Social Work with Groups, 16(3), 23–39.
- Strozier, A.L. (1997). Group work in social work education: what is being taught? Social Work with Groups, 20(1), 65–77.

Specific population: Aging

- Guida, F., Unterbach, A., Tavolacci, J., Provet, P. (2004). Residential substance abuse treatment for older adults: An enhanced therapeutic community model. Journal of Gerontological Social Work, 44(1/2), 95–109.

Specific population: Men

- Van Wormer, K. (1989). The male-specific group in alcoholism treatment. Small Group Behavior, 20(2), 228–242.

Specific population: People of colour

- Harper, F.D. (1984). Group strategies with black alcoholics. The Journal for Specialists in Group Work, 9(1), 38–43.
- Mok, B.H. (2001). The effectiveness of self-help groups in a Chinese context. Social Work with Groups, 24(2), 69–89

Specific population: People with substance use disorders

- Brody, A. (1982). S.O.B.E.R.: A stress management program for recovering alcoholics. Social Work with Groups, 5(1), 15–23.
- Brown, C. (1997). A hospital based early recovery group program for HIV-infected inner-city clients: Engagement strategies. Journal of Chemical Dependency Treatment, 7(1/2), 53–66.
- Citron, P. (1978). Group work with alcoholic, poly drug-involved adolescents with deviant behavior syndrome. Social Work with Groups, 1(1), 39–52.
- Cohen, M. and Spinner, A. (1982). A group curriculum for outpatient alcoholism treatment. Social Work with Groups, 5(1), 5–13.
- Fisher, M.S. (1995). Group therapy protocols for persons with personality disorders who abuse substances: effective treatment alternatives. Social Work with Groups, 18(4), 71–89.
- Fisher, M. (2004). Groups for substance abuse treatment. In C. Garvin, L. Gutierrez, and M. Galinsky (Eds.), Handbook of social work with groups (pp. 259–274). New York and London: The Guilford Press.
- Freeman, E.M. (1987). Consultation for improving group services to alcoholic clients. Social Work with Groups, 10(3), 99–116.
- Freeman, E.M. (2001). Substance abuse intervention, prevention, rehabilitation, and systems change strategies: Helping individuals, families, and groups to empower themselves. New York: Columbia University Press.
- Gilbert, M.C. and Beidler, A.E. (2001). Using the narrative approach in groups for chemically dependent mothers. Social Work with Groups, 24(3/4), 101–115.
- Greif, G.L. (1996). Ten Common Errors Beginning Substance Abuse Workers make In Group Treatment, Journal of Psychoactive Drugs, 28(3), 297–299.
- Guida, F., Unterbach, A., Tavolacci, J., Provet, P. (2004). Residential substance abuse treatment for older adults: An enhanced therapeutic community model. Journal of Gerontological Social Work, 44(1/2), 95–109.
- Hanson, M. (1994). Facilitating problem drinking clients' transition from inpatient to outpatient care. Journal of Chemical Dependency Treatment, 7(1/2), 21–36.
- Hanson, M., Foreman, L., Tomlin, W., and Bright, Y. (1994). Facilitating problem drinking clients' transition from inpatient to outpatient care. Health and Social Work, 19(1), 23–28.
- Harper, F.D. (1984). Group strategies with black alcoholics. The Journal for Specialists in Group Work, 9(1), 38–43.
- Hirayama, K.K., Hirayama, H., Kuroki, Y. (1997). Group treatment programs for alcoholism in the United States and Japan. In A. Alissi and C. Corto Mergins (Eds.) Voices from the Field: Group Work Responds, New York, NY: The Haworth Press.
- Joyce, C. and Hazelton, P. (1982). Women in groups: A pre-group experience for women in recovery from alcoholism and other addictions. Social Work with Groups, 5(1), 57–63.
- King, G. and Lorenson, J. (1989). Alcoholism training for social workers. Social Casework: The Journal of Contemporary Social Work, Volume, June, 375–382.
- McVinney, D. and Hamid, A. (2002). Substance using men with HIV concerns: An integrated group approach from a harm reduction perspective. Social Work with Groups, 25(3), 3–19.
- Milgram, D. and Rubin, J. (1992). Resisting the resistance: Involuntary substance abuse group therapy. Social Work with Groups, 15(1), 95–110.
- Orosz, S.B. (1982). Assertiveness in recovery. Social Work with Groups, 5(1), 25–31.
- Page, R. and Berkow, D.N. (1998). Group work as facilitation of Spiritual development for drug and alcohol abusers. Journal for Specialists in Group Work. 23, 3, 285–297.
- Plasse, B. (2000). Components of engagement: Women in a psychoeducational parenting skills group in substance abuse treatment. Social Work with Groups, 22(4), 33–49.
- Plasse, B. (2001). A stress reduction and self-care group for homeless and addicted women: Meditation, relaxation, and cognitive methods. Social Work with Groups, 24(3/4), 117–133.
- Pittman, J. and Gerstein, L.H. (1984). Graduated levels of group therapy for substance abusers. The Journal for Specialists in Group Work, 9(1), 7–13.
- Rhodes, R. and Johnson, A. (1996). Social group work with recovering women: an empowerment model. In B. Stempler, M. Glass (eds.) Social Group Work Today And Tomorrow: Moving from theory to advanced training and practice (pp. 87–99). New York: The Haworth Press.
- Shields, S.A. (1986). Busted and branded: Group work with substance abusing adolescents in schools. In A. Gitterman and L. Shulman (Eds.), The legacy of William Schwartz: Group practice as shared interaction (pp. 61–82). New York: Haworth Press.
- Shore, J. (1978). The use of self-identity workshops with recovering alcoholics. Social Work with Groups, 1(3), 299–307.
- Shulman, L. (2003). Crossing boundaries: Group work with persons with AIDS in early recovery from substance abuse. In j. Lindsay, D. Turcotte, E. Hopmeyer, (eds.) Crossing Boundaries and Developing alliances through group work (pp. 27–52). New York: The Haworth Press.
- Van Wormer, K. (1987). Group work with alcoholics: A phase approach. Social Work with Groups, 10(3), 81–97.
- Van Wormer, K. (1989). The male-specific group in alcoholism treatment. Small Group Behavior, 20(2), 228–242.
- Van Wormer, K. and Davies, D.R. (2003). Addiction treatment: A strengths perspective. Pacific Grove, CA: Brooks/Cole.

Specific population: People with HIV/AIDS

- Shulman, L. (2003). Crossing boundaries: Group work with persons with AIDS in early recovery from substance abuse. In j. Lindsay, D. Turcotte, E. Hopmeyer, (eds.) Crossing Boundaries and Developing alliances through group work (pp. 27–52). New York: The Haworth Press.

Specific population: People with involvement in the criminal justice system

- Goodman, H. (1997). Social group work in community corrections. Social Work with Groups, 20(1), 51–64.

Specific population: People mandated to treatment

- Behroozi, C.S. (1992). A model for social work with involuntary applicants in groups. Social Work with Groups, 15(2/3), 223–238.
- Caplan, T. (2008). After the fall: Using the Needs ABC model with couples affected by domestic Violence. In J.Hamel (Ed.), Intimate partner and family abuse: A casebook of gender inclusive therapy (pp. 45–58). New York: Springer Publishing Company
- Rooney, R. and Chovanec, M. (2004). Involuntary groups. In C. Garvin, L. Gutierrez, and M. Galinsky (Eds.), Handbook of social work with groups (pp. 212–226). New York and London: The Guilford Press
