= Berta Frey =

American weaver

- Photograph in Shuttle-Craft Bulletin, 1959
- Born: November 8, 1893; Texas, US
- Died: February 1, 1972 (aged 78); Bearsville, New York, US
- Occupations: Weaver, teacher, speaker and author
- Known for: Handweavers Guild of America

Berta Frey (November 8, 1893 – February 1, 1972) was a well-known New York weaver, who spoke and taught about weaving techniques for many years. She was one of the founders of the Handweavers Guild of America.

== Early years ==
Berta Frey was born on November 8, 1893 in Texas. During World War I (1914–1918) she was an occupational therapist specializing in woodworking in the army's Walter Reed Hospital in Washington, D.C. She learned handweaving at this time. When she found that no handlooms were being made in the United States, she used her woodworking skills to make looms for her patients and then for herself. Frey began by following Colonial weaving designs, but soon started to experiment with other patterns.

== Inter-war period ==
After the war, Frey moved to New York City with her parent and worked in the textile industry. She eventually opened a design studio in the city and began to teach weaving there. In 1934, Frey, already known as an author of technical works on handweaving, attended a summer session of the Penland Weaving Institute in the Blue Ridge Mountains of North Carolina. She was one of the initiators of construction of a new building for the school, which was outgrowing its facilities. Subscriptions were raised to build the Edward F. Worst Craft House, which had both classrooms and sleeping facilities. Many of the students at the Institute came from the local community.

An informal study group began to meet monthly at Frey's New York studio. On November 11, 1940 the New York Guild of Handweavers was established there at an organizational tea, and was headed by Frey. Most of the initial members worked in areas related to textiles as teachers, designers or occupational therapists. In 1941 Frey resigned from her position with the guild and returned to providing occupational therapy for the army.

== Post war ==
After World War II (1939–1945) Frey became Chair of the New York Guild's Program Committee. She often gave talks on different subjects, and frequently contributed to Handweaver and Craftsman, a national magazine launched in 1940. In May 1946 Frey conducted a conference on weaving at the YMCA in Milwaukee sponsored by the Milwaukee Weaver's Guild. She gave demonstrations of how to prepare the warp for the loom. In the years just after the war, Frey taught weaving at the Arrowmount School of Arts and Crafts in Gatlinburg, Tennessee, in summer workshops organized by Pi Beta Phi and the University of Tennessee. Frey was an instructor at the Fletcher Farm School in Vermont. In 1948 she published a second edition of her small book, Seven Projects in Rosepath. This was one of the first American guides for beginner handweavers.

On April 8-9, 1955 a meeting of 135 members of Ontario weaving guilds was held at the Heliconian Club in Toronto. Frey gave a talk and demonstrated putting on a multicolored warp. The group formed an advisory committee to look into setting up a provincial organization, leading to the foundation of the Ontario Handweavers & Spinners (OHS) the next year. She returned to Ontario in 1960, when she was the principal speaker at the OHS conference organized by the Ottawa Valley Weavers Guild. She talked about handweaving from ancient times until the present, and later showed how ancient designs could be used in modern settings. In 1967 she was again in Ontario as one of the judges of the OHS exhibition Fashion Fabrics, which opened in Kingston, Ontario in October 1967 and circulated for the next two years.

In 1969 Frey was one of the founders of the Handweavers Guild of America (HGA) and served on its first board of directors. At this time she was teaching weaving in Woodstock, New York. She died on February 1, 1972 at the age of 78 in Bearsville, New York, just to the west of Woodstock.

The HGA held its first convention, in Detroit, Michigan, on June 8-11, 1972. Garnette Johnson announced the HGA Scholarship fund, established in memory of Frey. The Thousand Islands Arts Center in Clayton, New York has an extensive collection of textiles made by Frey.

== Publications ==
Some of Frey's publications include:

- Frey, Berta (1948). Seven Projects in Rosepath. The Author.
- Frey, Berta (1968). Designing and Drafting for Handweavers: Basic Principles of Cloth Construction. Macmillan Publishing Company. ISBN 978-0-02-541460-0.
- Frey, Berta (1972). Four harness weaving. Handweavers Guild of America.
