= Eugene Textile Center =

Fiber arts textile center

- Company type: Retail
- Founded: 2008
- Key people: Suzie Liles, President

I went in through the store looking for the gallery... Going through the store is like entering a show through the artist’s studio. Instead of tubes of paint you see spools of colorful yarn, and in place of easels, perhaps a warping board and a loom.

– Ester Barkai

Eugene Textile Center (ETC) is a studio and a regional source of fiber arts materials, equipment, and lessons in weaving, spinning, dyeing, and felting, founded by Suzie Liles and Marilyn Robert in 2008 in Eugene, Oregon. ETC offers classes and studio space for weaving and surface design, as well as meeting space for the Eugene Weavers' Guild.

The Center also maintains a gallery showing rotating exhibits of fiber arts. The Arts and Business Alliance of Eugene, a project supported by the Oregon Arts Commission and the National Endowment for the Arts, described ETC in 2013 as "the only combination studio/retail outlet/educational center of its kind in the Pacific Northwest".
