= Joseph Skinger =

American sculptor

- Born: March 16, 1911; Worcester, Massachusetts, U.S.
- Died: January 1967 (age 55); Stowe, Vermont, U.S.
- Occupations: Sculptor, Jeweler

Joseph A. Skinger (March 16, 1911 – January 1967) was an American metalsmith and sculptor of the 1950s and 1960s. He practiced in Vermont, and as a craftsman his work in hand-wrought jewelry was primarily carried out in silver. He designed and created production pieces made by himself and his assistant Gay Bessette. In addition he created unique jewelry pieces, often in molten silver and sometimes combined with stones or wood. In sculpture the main body of his work was in molten silver and cast bronze. Other sculptural works were created in wood, copper, and corrugated fiberglass.

== Personal history ==
Born in Worcester, Massachusetts, Skinger moved to Alburg Springs in northwestern Vermont permanently in 1946, following World War II. He had purchased his 1880s house in the late 1930s, following a fishing trip with friends to Missisquoi Bay – the northernmost part of Lake Champlain.

Skinger named the Alburg Springs house "Clover Gables" after the clover-shaped gingerbread lining the gables. Joe worked on the renovation of the Alburg Springs house on weekends and vacations while working his day job at a steel mill, American Steel and Wire in his native Worcester. The original barn on the property in Alburg Springs became his first shop and studio where he made jewelry and sculpture. Skinger's first enterprise was named The Islanders. His identity as craftsman and artist was now well underway.

== Early life ==
As a youth, Skinger was first exposed to art and took art classes at the Worcester Art Museum. Though largely self-taught, he studied metal working in England at the London Central School of Arts and Crafts in 1951 on the GI Bill. Skinger's inclination to work in metal began at an early age. As a child, his mother, Rose Gaier Skinger, often scolded him for wasting heat by melting metal in the furnace of their house in Worcester. Joe would then make things out of the softened metal.

== Family life ==
In 1946, Joe married Constance Adams (1914–2005) of Llewellyn Park, New Jersey . They moved from Massachusetts, where they had both been stationed during WWII, to the Alburg Springs house in the Lake Champlain Islands he had been renovating. Together they completed work on the house, building chimneys and fireplaces, installing plumbing and electrical systems, and doing all of the finish work. They had three daughters: Jody, Erica, and Carol.

In 1958, the family moved to Stowe, where Skinger continued to work in jewelry and sculpture in the barn he renovated for a workshop and showroom. This barn came attached to a house which was an operating family ski lodge, then known as The Tucker House. Two months after the Skingers moved in—ski guests holding reservations began to arrive. In the late 1960s, teenage daughter Erica was a World Cup alpine ski racer with the U.S. Ski Team.

== Commercial jewelry business ==
His business "Silver by Skinger" was widely known to thousands of visitors to Stowe. “Silver by Skinger” was located a mile below the Toll House on the Mountain Road. His shop was known as the “Home of the Slalom Ring ” though there were many imitators in ski areas around the country as the slalom ring gained in popularity with skiers. Each sterling silver slalom ring was hand wrought, of a heavy gauge silver and came with hammer marks.

== History of the Slalom Ring ==
Slalom Ring was not the first name of the ring. When Joe was at London Central School of Arts and Crafts in the early 1950s, he saw a piece of jewelry titled “slave ring” at the British Museum. It was basically a similar shape -two V's - but very wide and flat- with engravings. He thought he could make a similar shape though more minimal in execution- more like a wavy line and less like a broad flat shape.

In Alburg Springs, he called it a slave ring after the ring at the British Museum which had been his motivation.

When Skinger moved to Stowe, he decided that the ring had more commercial value as a "slalom ring". It caught on with college kids and skiers—though even before Skinger moved to Stowe the design already had its niche. Because of the iconic status, the slalom ring was indeed the bread and butter of his business. Unable to obtain a copyright, the design deemed too simple, it is still reproduced and sold in ski areas. In the 1950s and 1960s, the era depicted in the TV series Madmen, an original hand wrought slalom ring from Skinger's "Home of the Slalom Ring" shop on the Mountain Road was a must have if you were a skier.

Skinger was profiled in Vermont Life in Autumn 1953, and memorialized in Vermont Skiing in 1967 by Peter Miller. Several New England newspapers ran feature stories focusing on Skinger's popular jewelry.

== Teaching ==
In addition to creating jewelry and sculpture, Skinger taught Jewelry and Metals at the University of Vermont Summer Sessions and the Fletcher Farm Craft School in the 1950s. Joe hired Gay Bessette, his top metals and jewelry student at Fletcher Farm Craft School, beginning their ten-year association at Silver by Skinger.

== Sculpting ==
A designer and craftsman in hand wrought silver jewelry by vocation, Joe also worked in sculpture. Beginning with molten silver sculptures, his work went on to other mediums including cast bronze, wood and fiber glass.

Skinger traveled to Boston to see the Andy Warhol show at The Institute of Contemporary Art in autumn of 1966. Warhol's work had a big effect on him and Skinger's sculpture took a major turn in material, style and concept from anything that came before. As soon as he returned to his studio he began to work on a new collection of "pop" sculpture. This collection was large in scale and was stored in the upper level over the shop when the house changed hands in the early 1970s. A subsequent fire destroyed this collection of sculpture which was made in the 3 months before he died in January 1967. All of his other work in sculpture amounting to about 90 pieces remain in a single collection.

== Exhibitions ==
Joe's jewelry was exhibited several times at the Fleming Museum in Burlington but he never allowed his sculptures to be sold or exhibited during his life, preferring to keep his entire sculpture collection together as he added to it. The Albright Knox Gallery in Buffalo, NY pursued him to have a show of his sculpture; however, Joe's ultimate goal was to exhibit his work at MoMA.

Sumner Crosby, an art historian from Yale University, was a supporter and provided contacts for Skinger. However, Skinger died suddenly in January 1967 before any agreement could be made with outside galleries. Following his death there was one exhibit of his sculpture at Assumption College in Worcester, MA.

== Posthumous accolades ==
Barbara Knapp Hamblett, former curator of the Shelburne Museum, in a letter to the editor of the Burlington Free Press wrote:

This craftsman (Joe Skinger) deserves to have his name returned to the forefront of committed craftspeople and designers who believed that through their ingenuity and skill of their hands Vermont’s beauty and simplicity could be transformed into works of art. They set the foundation for fine crafts and art to be valued as a vital part of our state’s cultural heritage.

In January 2009, the life and career of Joe Skinger was added to the State of Craft project in Vermont. The Vermont Crafts Council, in anticipation of its 20th anniversary in 2010, launched a multi-faceted, collaborative initiative encompassing documentation, interpretation, and acquisition. The purpose of the project is to illuminate the individual careers of master Vermont artists (makers) and to document the evolution of the larger crafts community (as reflected in the history of key organizations, events and projects) through three distinct periods—1960–1980, 1981–1990, and 1991–present. Project research includes archival study, oral history interviews, field photography, and curatorial survey/evaluation. Skinger's career is positioned in the first period 1960–1980. Bennington Museum hosted the resulting exhibit 'State of Craft: Exploring the Studio Craft Movement in Vermont 1960–2010' from May 22- October 31, 2010. Representative pieces from selected artist/ makers were on display. Skinger's pieces were Slalom Ring and Slalom Bracelet, Snowflake Brooch, Mountain Shadow Brooch.

Two volumes of information including photos of his jewelry and sculpture, graphics of ads and logos and copies of correspondence and articles were given to the Vermont Ski Museum in Stowe, VT on the 40th anniversary of his death in January 2007.

== Contemporary demand for Skinger's work ==
Skinger's jewelry is often traded online on vintage jewelry sites under mid century modern.

== Jewelry ==
Slalom Ring

Slalom Ring and Slalom Bracelet

Mountain Shadow detail

Flying Geese detail

Chain Bracelet Detail
