= Handweavers Guild of America =

- Formation: 1969
- Founder: Berta Frey
- Headquarters: Atlanta, Georgia
- Coordinates: 34.034745°N 84.089087°W
- Region served: United States and Canada
- Members: Fiber artists and educators
- Official language: English
- President: Penny Morgan
- Executive Director: Elizabeth Williamson
- Website: www.weavespindye.org

Founded in 1969, the Handweavers Guild of America, Inc. (HGA), brings together weavers, spinners, dyers, basketmakers, fiber artists, and educators. HGA provides educational programs, conferences, and a quarterly publication, Shuttle Spindle & Dyepot, to its members.

== Foundation ==
The Handweavers Guild of America (HGA) was founded in 1969. The well-known New York weaver Berta Frey was one of the founders and served on the guild's first board of directors. HGA's mission is to educate, support and inspire the fiber art community. The organization is non-profit and has an international membership. Members include weavers, spinners, dyers, basketmakers, fiber artists at all levels, and teachers. HGA is based in Atlanta, Georgia.

== Activities ==
In support of the fiber community, HGA provides a variety of educational opportunities, resources, programs, and events.

Programs

HGA's Textile Exchange Programs are open to active HGA members and are ideal for personal use or guild study groups. Exchanges include the Handspun Skein Exchange, the Handwoven Bookmark Exchange, the Handwoven Towel Exchange, and the Handwoven Scarf Exchange.

Grants & Scholarships

HGA provides financial grant assistance for members to take non-accredited fiber art workshops and classes or to attend a fiber art regional conference and financial assistance for teaching members to offer classes to beginning weaving and spinning students. Available grants include the Silvio and Eugenia Petrini Grant, the Mearl K. Gable II Memorial Grant, and the Teach-It-Forward Grant.

HGA also offers scholarships for students enrolled in accredited academic programs in the United States and Canada. The scholarships fund students furthering their education in the field of fiber arts, including textile research, history, and conservation. Rather than financial need, scholarship funds are awarded based on artistic and technical excellence and/or on demonstrated excellence in research of textiles, textile history, and textile conservation.

The Dendel Scholarship is made possible by a donation in honor of the late Gerald and Esther Dendel to foster studies in handweaving. Dendel Scholarship funds may be used for tuition as well as materials or travel as determined on a case-by-case basis.

Events

Spinning and Weaving Week is a celebration of HGA's international membership. Fiber artists from around the world join a variety of activities and events in celebration of the heritage of spinning and weaving. Spinning and Weaving Week is celebrated every October.

Career in Textiles is a one-day online symposium that spotlights leading professional and industry trendsetters, sharing their experiences and providing insights on the diverse and changing landscape of textiles and fiber art. The symposium is open to all, but is geared toward young professionals, recent graduates, and students.

Small Expressions is an annual exhibit of juried works showcasing fiber art on a small scale. The exhibit opens each summer and is available to tour to galleries and museums throughout the United States for the duration of a year to raise awareness and appreciation for the fiber arts.

Convergence®

In 1986 the HGA held Convergence '86 in Toronto, Canada, its first biennial meeting outside the U.S. The conference was co-hosted by the Ontario Crafts Council and the Ontario Handweavers & Spinners. About 2,000 weavers and spinners attended the conference and more than forty galleries in Toronto and the region gave weaving exhibitions.

Today, Convergence® is a biennial conference that brings together fiber arts to observe exhibits by artists from around the world, take seminars and workshops by leaders and innovators, contribute to community, tour artist studios, and shop at a fiber art marketplace.

Resources

HGA hosts directories of Affiliate Fiber Arts Guilds and Professional Members, as well as a Fiber Arts Calendar.

== Shuttle Spindle & Dyepot Magazine ==
Published quarterly and distributed to all HGA members, Shuttle Spindle & Dyepot features a broad spectrum of articles about the fiber arts, including design, history, shows, education, products, books, national and international textile news, as well as updates about HGA programs and people, and information received from local and regional guilds. The magazine's readership is approximately 4,000 per issue. It is available for members in print and online.
