= Australian Association of Social Workers =

Professional organization in Australia

The Australian Association of Social Workers (AASW) is the professional representative body of social workers in Australia. It was formed in 1946 at the federal level, although a number of state branches had formed prior to this. The AASW created a code of ethics that governs the conduct of social workers and promotes the interests of social workers in Australia.

The Australian Association of Social Workers has a commitment to the international social work community, and is a member of the International Federation of Social Workers (IFSW).

== AASW code of ethics ==
The AASW code of ethics is a document for social workers in Australia created to guide and assist in reaching professional goals. It identifies core values and ethics to provide a guide for ethical and accountable practice. The document presents three core values (as opposed to five previously) that give rise to general and specific ethical responsibilities.

They are further explained as below

- Respect for persons – Every human being is important and unique. Every person has the right to self-determination, self-fulfilment and wellbeing. Social work practice promotes justice and personal responsibility with consideration to the rights of those around them.
- Social justice – Social work practice should promote fairness and social justice in any society, taking special considerations for those marginalised. It also encourages the advocating of societal change eliminating oppression towards those who are vulnerable.
- Professional integrity – The social work profession values honesty, transparency, reliability, empathy, reflective self-awareness, discernment, competence and commitment. This value is concerned with professional conduct, acting with dignity and commitment to lifelong development as a professional.

== Accreditation of social workers ==
The AASW oversees an accreditation process for members in order to ensure and promote competency in social work practice. The process consists of a mix of research, supervision and training.

== Journal ==
The AASW publishes the quarterly journal Australian Social Work. It publishes research and thinking by social workers on political, economic and social policies and programs and on professional practice and education. It is a professionally edited and refereed journal, led by a national committee of practitioners and academics.

Australian Association of Social Workers (1971), Australian social work, Australian Association of Social Workers, ISSN 0312-407X

== See also ==
- Social work
- Professional Social Workers' Association
- Accredited Social Worker
- Norma Parker
- International Association of Schools of Social Work (IASSW)
