= Anita Gibbs =

New Zealand sociologist

- Awards: Critic and Conscience of Society Award

Academic background
- Education: University of Bristol
- Thesis: Probation partnerships : an exploration of roles, relationships and meanings, with probation staff, voluntary representatives and users (1996)

Academic work
- Institutions: University of Otago, University of Oxford

Anita Gibbs is a New Zealand academic, and is Professor of Criminology and Social Work at the University of Otago, specialising in sociology, the impact on people of complex social systems such as mental health and criminal justice systems, and Fetal Alcohol Spectrum Disorder.

== Academic career ==
Gibbs is an academic and a practising social worker, having trained in the UK, and worked in the UK probation service. After completing a PhD titled Probation partnerships: an exploration of roles, relationships and meanings, with probation staff, voluntary representatives and users at the University of Bristol, Gibbs then carried out postdoctoral research at the University of Oxford. Gibbs joined the faculty of the University of Otago in 1999, rising to full professor in 2022. Gibbs lectures on criminology, social work and sociology.

Gibbs's research focuses on what effects there are on individuals of becoming involved in complex social systems, such as systems around mental health, criminal justice, fostering and adoption, and disability. Gibbs is also interested in Fetal Alcohol Spectrum Disorder (FASD), and has developed evidence-based materials for carers, and runs a support group for people living with the effects of FASD. FASD affects over 3000 babies born every year in New Zealand, and has lifelong effects.

== Awards and honours ==
In 2020, Gibbs was awarded the Critic and Conscience of Society Award, worth $50,000, by the GAMA Foundation and Universities New Zealand. The award recognised Gibbs' efforts to raise awareness of FASD as a hidden disability.

== Selected works ==
- Gibbs, Anita (2024). "'No one believed us: no one came to help': caregivers' experiences of violence and abuse involving children with fetal alcohol spectrum disorder". Australian and New Zealand Journal of Family Therapy. doi:10.1002/anzf.1575. Wikidata Q124607936.
- Walker, Shayne William; Anaru Eketone; Gibbs, Anita (2006). "An exploration of kaupapa Maori research, its principles, processes and applications". International Journal of Social Research Methodology. 9 (4): 331–344. doi:10.1080/13645570600916049. Wikidata Q106968376.
- Gibbs, Anita; Julie Flanagan; Louise Gray (2023). "An Australian online training and support program for caregivers of children and youth with Fetal Alcohol Spectrum Disorder: Families linking with families". Journal of Intellectual & Developmental Disability: 1–11. doi:10.3109/13668250.2023.2271757. Wikidata Q124607938.
- Gibbs, Anita (2022). "We are not doing enough for children with neuro-disabilities". Aotearoa New Zealand Social Work Review. 34 (2): 90–93. doi:10.11157/anzswj-vol34iss2id956. Wikidata Q124607939.
- Gibbs, Anita; Bagley, Kerryn; Badry, Dorothy; Vicky Gollner (2018). "Foetal alcohol spectrum disorder: Effective helping responses from social workers". International Social Work. 63 (4): 496–509. doi:10.1177/0020872818804032. Wikidata Q124607940.
- Gibbs, Anita (2019). "An evidence-based training and support course for caregivers of children with foetal alcohol spectrum disorder (FASD) in New Zealand". Advances in dual diagnosis. 12 (1/2): 73–84. doi:10.1108/add-10-2018-0013. Wikidata Q124607941.
