= Antonio López Peláez =

Spanish Professor of Social Work and Social Services

- Born: 11 December 1965 (age 60); Málaga, Spain
- Occupations: Scholar, professor

Academic background
- Education: National Distance Education University
- Doctoral advisor: José Félix Tezanos

Academic work
- Discipline: Social Work, Social Services
- Institutions: National Distance Education University
- Doctoral students: David Hernández de la Fuente

Antonio López Peláez (born 11 December 1965) is a Spanish Professor of Social Work and Social Services, Department of Social Work, Faculty of Law, National Distance Education University (UNED), Spain.

== Biography ==
Antonio López Peláez was instrumental in the implementation of social work studies at the UNED, serving as the first academic secretary of the degree in Social Work (2003-2005). He was the first Full Professor of Social Work and Social Services at UNED (2010). He is currently the Director of the Chair in innovation in Social Services and Dependency, the first chair of its kind to be created on this subject in the Spanish university system, and the Chair in Social Inclusion of the UNED. His work is focused on Digital Social Work, Social Welfare, Participation and Social Policy. From 2020 to the present, is serving as Executive Director of the International Council on Social Welfare (ICSW).

He was the founding editor of the journal Comunitania. International Journal of Social Work and Social Sciences (2011-2022), managing to place it in Quartile 1 in the bibliographic database Dialnet in 2020. He was the founding director of the Master in Social Work, Welfare State and Metholodogies of Social Intervention at UNED (2013-2020). Director of the UNED Associated Center of Segovia (2006-2015), during his tenure the university center was awarded with the bronze medal of the city of Segovia (2009), one of the most important news of 2009 in Segovia according to the newspaper El Adelantado.

In a society of digital natives, he has highlighted the relationship between late emancipation and the crisis of legitimacy of democratic institutions. Within his contributions to digital social work, he has highlighted how technological innovations transform welfare systems, and how digital innovation has become a key tool to address humanitarian crises. During the COVID-19 pandemic, he launched in March 2020 the first Spanish-language YouTube channel on Digital Social Work, which has been recognized as a means "of sharing information and disseminating guidance for social work practice and innovative interventions". In 2022, he served as co-Chair of The Joint World Conference on Social Work, Education and Social Development (SWESD2022) (Seoul, 26–28 October 2022), under the theme "Redefining Social Policy and Social Work Practice in a Post-Pandemic Society: Social Welfare Programs and Social Work Education at a Crossroads". In 2023, his article "Food security and social protection in times of COVID-19" has become the Top Trending article in the International Social Work Journal. In 2023 he co-edited with Gloria Kirwan The Routledge International Handbook of Digital Social Work, which "offers a unique intersection of social work, technology, and ethics, especially timely given the COVID-19 pandemic's acceleration of digital methods in professional practices", paying special attention to "digitalization in the field of social services and social work". In this regard, it offers "insights into the concrete experiences of social workers and service users benefiting from digitalization and suffering as a result of this". On May 5, 2025, Professor Antonio López Peláez gave the Friedlander Lecture at the University of California Berkeley Social Welfare (an annual guest lecture sponsored by the Professor Walter Friedlander Fund that recognizes an internationally prominent professor in the social sciences), entitled: Digital Social Work: coping with digital vulnerability in times of AI.

== Works ==
- López Peláez, Antonio; Kirwan, Gloria, eds. (2023). The Routledge International Handbook of Digital Social Work. London: Routledge. ISBN 9780367499945.
- López Peláez, Antonio; Sang-Mok, Suh; Sergei, Zelenev, eds. (2023). Digital transformation and social well-being: promoting an inclusive society. London. ISBN 978-1-003-31220-8. OCLC 1334895425.
- López Peláez, Antonio; Gómez Ciriano, Emilio José, eds. (2019). Austerity, social work and welfare policies: a global perspective. Cizur Menor (Navarra): Aranzadi. ISBN 978-84-1309-676-6. OCLC 1107049607.
- López Peláez, Antonio; Raya Díez, María Esther, eds. (2017). Social work research and practice: contributing to a science of social work. Cizur Menor, Navarra: Aranzadi. ISBN 978-84-9177-265-1. OCLC 1026088182.
- López Peláez, Antonio, ed. (2015). Social work challenges in the XXI century: perspectives from the USA. Cizur Menor, Navarra: Aranzadi. ISBN 978-84-9098-282-2. OCLC 922109727.
- López Peláez, Antonio (2024). Teoría del Trabajo Social con Grupos / Theory of Social Work with groups (3 ed.). Madrid: Universitas. ISBN 978-84-7991-625-1.
- López Peláez, Antonio, ed. (2014). The Robotics DivideA New Frontier in the 21st Century?. London: Springer. ISBN 978-1-4471-5357-3.
- Lopez Peláez, Antonio; Keet, Annamarie; Moon Sung, Chung (2025). Social Welfare Programs and Social Work Education at a CrossRoads. New Approaches for a Post-Pandemic Society. Londres: Routledge.

== Bibliography ==
- Díaz de Mera, Emilio (2016-01-01). "RESEÑA de: Antonio López Peláez. Teoría del Trabajo Social con Grupos. Segunda Edición revisada y ampliada / Theory of Social Work with Groups. 2 Ed., 2015. Madrid: Universitas". Comunitania. Revista Internacional de Trabajo Social y Ciencias Sociales (11): 169. doi:10.5944/comunitania.11.9. ISSN 2173-0520.
- Martínez Herrero, María Inés (2020-08-17). "Austerity, social work and welfare policies: a global perspective: Coordinated by Antonio López Peláez and Emilio José Gómez Ciriano, Pamplona, Spain, Thomson Reuters Aranzadi, 2019, 240 pp., ISBN 978-84-1309-676-6". Social Work Education. 39 (6): 843–845. doi:10.1080/02615479.2020.1781984. ISSN 0261-5479. S2CID 221178822.
- Pérez García, Raquel (2015-07-01). "RESEÑA de: Antonio López Peláez (coord.). Social Work Challenges in the XXI Century: Perspectives from the USA / Retos para el Trabajo Social en el siglo XXI: perspectivas desde los Estados Unidos de América, 2015. Pamplona: Thomson-Reuters Aranzadi". Comunitania. Revista Internacional de Trabajo Social y Ciencias Sociales (10): 133. doi:10.5944/comunitania.10.8. hdl:2454/40996. ISSN 2173-0520.
- Torres-Andrés, Nagore (2018-06-28). "Book review: López Peláez, A. y Raya Diez, E. (coords.) (2017). Social work research and practice. Contributing to a science of social work. Cizur Menor, Navarra: Editorial Aranzadi". Trabajo Social Global-Global Social Work. 8 (14): 237–239. doi:10.30827/tsg-gsw.v8i14.7343. ISSN 2013-6757. S2CID 149602498.
- Zarco, Juan (2015). "The Robotics Divide. A New Frontier in the 21st Century?". Reis. Revista Española de Investigaciones Sociológicas (150): 222–225. ISSN 0210-5233.
- Kardawi, M. Y.; Simanjuntak, M. Elvina (2024). "The Routledge international handbook of digital social work: Peláez, A. L., & Kirwan, G. (Eds.) (2023)". Journal of Human Behavior in the Social Environment. Londres y Nueva York: Routledge: 1–4. doi:10.1080/10911359.2024.2425770.
- Díaz de Mera, E. (2025). "Antonio López Peláez y Gloria Kirwan (eds.). The Routledge International Handbook of Digital Social Work". Revista CENTRA de Ciencias Sociales. 4 (1). Nueva York: Routledge: 243–248. doi:10.54790/rccs.121.
- Martínez Herrero, M. I. (2024). "The Routledge international handbook of digital social work: edited by Antonio López and Gloria Kirwan". Social Work Education. Oxon y Nueva York: Routledge: 1–2. doi:10.1080/02615479.2024.2399325.
