= Antoinette Lombard =

- Scientific career
- Fields: Social work
- Institutions: University of Pretoria

Antoinette Lombard is the Head of the Department of Social Work and Criminology and a Professor in Social Work at the University of Pretoria. She is a member of the Academy of Science of South Africa. She was awarded the James Billups Leadership Award in Social Development in 2013 from the International Consortium for Social Development. She is the Programme Director of the Fordham University’s Ubuntu Exchange Programme with the University of Pretoria. She is the Chairperson of Global Agenda Committee in International Association of Schools of Social Work.
