= Universities New Zealand =

Peak body representing universities in New Zealand

Universities New Zealand - Te Pōkai Tara is the peak body representing universities in New Zealand. It assumes the roles previously held by New Zealand Vice-Chancellors' Committee and the University Grants Committee which were founded in the Universities Act of 1961 which dissolved the University of New Zealand into its constituent institutions. Universities New Zealand control some scholarships and consistent academic grading. It also acts as a vehicle for consortia deals on copyright and other commercial interests and campaigns for better government funding of universities.

== Graduate Longitudinal Study New Zealand ==
The Graduate Longitudinal Study New Zealand is a survey launched in 2011. Commissioned by Universities New Zealand, the study is government-funded and aims to determine the ongoing impact of a tertiary education on graduates’ lives. About 14,000 final-year students will be surveyed in 2011 and again in 2013, 2016 and 2021. The Graduate Longitudinal Study New Zealand will be the most comprehensive study of a country's graduates. The study aims to understand the value of a New Zealand tertiary education by exploring how graduates fare in the years following university, in terms of their lifestyles, employment, career development, and their health and well-being.

== Critic and Conscience of Society Award ==
In 2017 Universities New Zealand established the Critic and Conscience of Society Award, to encourage academics "to provide expert commentary on important issues affecting the New Zealand community and future generations". The award is sponsored by the Gama Foundation, a charitable foundation established by Grant and Marilyn Nelson.

Winners of the award include:

- Mike Joy (2017)
- Ann Brower (2018)
- Andrew Geddis (2019)
- Michael Baker and Anita Gibbs (2020)
- Alexander Gillespie and Siouxsie Wiles (2021)
- Janet Hoek (2022)
- Dean Knight (2023)
- Robert Patman (2024)
- Boyd Swinburn (2025)
- Andrew Lensen and Rod McNaughton (2026) for "reframing the New Zealand debates on AI and on entrepreneurship"

== See also ==
- Tertiary education in New Zealand
