= ICSD =

ICSD may refer to:

- Interfaith Center for Sustainable Development
- Inorganic Crystal Structure Database
- International central securities depository
- International Classification of Sleep Disorders
- International Consortium for Social Development
- Ithaca City School District
- International Committee of Sports for the Deaf
- Independent Scientific Committee on Drugs, former name of Drug Science
- Islamic Center of San Diego, the site of the 2026 Islamic Center of San Diego shooting
