= International Consortium for Social Development =

Global professional association in social development

- Abbreviation: ICSD
- Predecessor: Inter-University Consortium for International Social Development (IUCISD)
- Formation: 1974
- Type: Professional association
- Purpose: Research, education, and practice in social development
- Region served: International
- Website: www.socialdevelopment.net

The International Consortium for Social Development (ICSD) is an international professional association that promotes research, education, and practice on social development. It originated in the early 1970s among U.S. schools of social work and took formal shape in 1974; in 1977 it formally became the Inter-University Consortium for International Social Development (IUCISD), and in 2005 it adopted its present name to reflect a broadened, international membership base. ICSD convenes biennial international conferences and supports the peer-reviewed journal Social Development Issues.

== History ==
The consortium traces its origins to the early 1970s, when U.S.-based social work scholars in the Midwest states began discussing ways to integrate social development concepts into education and practice. At that time, social work curricula in the United States were dominated by clinical practice, which many considered inadequate for addressing structural poverty and global inequality.

In 1974–75, seven schools of social work formed the Midwest Inter-University Consortium for International Social Development (MIUCISD). Responding to interest beyond the Midwest, members approved a memorandum of cooperation in 1977 and renamed the body the Inter-University Consortium for International Social Development (IUCISD). The change expanded participation outside the region and revised the consortium’s goals to emphasize engagement with developing countries.

At the 2005 biennial symposium in Recife, Brazil, members adopted the name International Consortium for Social Development (ICSD) to reflect inclusion of individual academics across disciplines as well as governmental and non-governmental organizations globally.

== Main activities ==
=== Conferences ===
The consortium organizes biennial international conferences that provide a forum for scholars, practitioners, and policymakers to exchange ideas on social development. Themes often address issues such as poverty reduction, sustainable development, peace, human rights, and social justice.

=== Publications ===
ICSD supports the peer-reviewed academic journal Social Development Issues (SDI), founded in 1977. It replaced the earlier Iowa Journal of Social Work (1968–1976). The journal publishes research on theoretical, empirical, and practice dimensions of social development. Social Development Issues serves as the consortium’s flagship publication and remains a primary outlet for interdisciplinary work in the field.

=== Policy engagement ===
Beyond conferences and publications, ICSD engages in global policy dialogues. The consortium has collaborated with intergovernmental organizations and non-governmental organizations on issues such as the World Summit for Social Development, the United Nations 2030 Agenda for Sustainable Development, and debates on social integration and inclusive governance. Through these activities, ICSD has sought to influence the direction of international social policy and to promote evidence-based approaches that empower disadvantaged populations. ICSD frequently collaborates with sister organizations: International Association of Schools of Social Work (IASSW), the International Federation of Social Workers (IFSW), and the International Council on Social Welfare (ICSW) to influence global policy.

== Membership ==
ICSD is a membership-based organization and members come from a range of disciplines including social work, sociology, economics, public health, political science, and international development. To extend its reach, ICSD supports regional branches in Asia-Pacific, Africa, Europe, and Latin America.

== See also ==
- Civil society
- Social justice
