= PSWA =

PSWA may refer to:

- Philadelphia Sports Writers Association (USA), founded in 1904, in Philadelphia, Pennsylvania
- Professional Social Workers' Association (India), an association of Indian / Tamil Nadu social work professionals
