= National Association of Social Workers =

U.S. professional organization

- Formation: 1955
- Type: Professional association
- Headquarters: Washington, DC, US
- Location: United States
- Members: 120,000
- Official language: English
- Board President: Yvonne Chase
- Key people: Anthony Estreet, Chief Executive Officer
- Website: www.socialworkers.org

The National Association of Social Workers (NASW) is a professional organization of social workers in the United States. NASW has about 120,000 members. The NASW provides guidance, research, information, advocacy, and other resources for its members and for social workers in general. Members of the NASW are also able to obtain malpractice insurance, members-only publications, discounts on other products and services, and continuing education.

== History ==
In 1955, the National Association of Social Workers was established through the consolidation of the following seven organizations:

- American Association of Social Workers
- American Association of Psychiatric Social Workers
- American Association of Group Workers
- Association for the Study of Community Organization
- American Association of Medical Social Workers
- National Association of School Social Workers
- Social Work Research Group

== Chapters ==
NASW has 55 chapters, with chapters in each of the 50 states, New York City, Washington, D.C., Puerto Rico, the United States Virgin Islands, and Guam. Each chapter has a board of directors that develops programs to serve its members and to facilitate participation by its members.

== Code of ethics ==
The 1996 NASW Delegate Assembly (revised by the 2017 NASW Delegate Assembly) approved the NASW Code of Ethics (available in English and Spanish), which is intended to serve as a guide to the everyday professional conduct of social workers. This Code includes four sections. The first Section, "Preamble", summarizes the social work profession's mission and core values. The second section, "Purpose of the NASW Code of Ethics", provides an overview of the Code's main functions and a brief guide for dealing with ethical issues or dilemmas in social work practice. The third section, "Ethical Principles", presents broad ethical principles, based on social work's core values, that inform social work practice. The final section, "Ethical Standards", includes specific ethical standards to guide social workers' conduct and to provide a basis for adjudication. Since 2012, the Code of Ethics includes an LGBT non-discrimination policy. The 2018 revision of the Code of Ethics includes 19 changes that address ethical responsibilities when using technology.

== NASW Press ==
NASW Press is the division of the National Association of Social Workers that publishes books and journals for the social work profession. The NASW Press was formally established in 1990 to advance social work scholarship through the publication of books, journals, and other resources. The NASW Press portfolio includes academic journals, scholarly texts, practice manuals, reference works, pamphlets, brochures, and videos.

NASW Press publishes over 100 scholarly textbooks, peer-reviewed journals, practice manuals, reference works, pamphlets, videos, and brochures in the United States and abroad.

- Books: The NASW Press catalog includes scholarly books and e-books, practice manuals, brochures and posters.

== See also ==
- Professional Social Workers' Association
- International Federation of Social Workers
