= Marilyn Montenegro =

Marilyn Montenegro is an American social worker located in California. She specializes in cases that involve women who are incarcerated or being released from prison/jail. She has been recognized in many different areas for her dedication to social work and changing social welfare.

== Beginning ==
Montenegro visited a friend in a Kentucky jail in the 1970s, which led to her meeting other female inmates. Montenegro's goal was to change this model to a restorative justice model and help with the rehabilitation of offenders. This visit lead to Montenegro forming the Prison Project through the National Association of Social Work. This movement eventually caused the shut down of a deprivation program that was organized to punish females being held in prisons.

== Organization ==
Marilyn Montenegro is a part of the nationwide task force Social Workers Against Solitary Confinement (SWASC), founded in October 2014. This organization is devoted to confronting problems on a macro and micro level of social work. SWASC works with mass incarceration and are involved in these prisons. SWASC is designed to develop techniques to support individuals that have been in solitary for long periods of time. The organization also seeks out to the federal, state, and local levels to eliminate cruel and inhumane punishments in prisons and jails.

== Purpose ==
Montenegro works specifically with the prison system located in California, where as most of her clients consists of non-violent drug offenses.

== Accomplishments ==
On November 11, 2014, Montenegro was inducted into the Hall Of Distinction that distinguishes social worker leaders that are committed to resolving issues based on social justice and social welfare. She also received the NASW 2002 social worker of the year. Montenegro is the founder and coordinator of the Prison Project, which is designed to reevaluate the justice system.
