= Personal practice model (social work) =

A Personal practice model (PPM) is a social work tool for understanding and linking theories to each other and to the practical tasks of social work.

Mullen describes the PPM as “the art and science of social work”, or more prosaically, “an explicit conceptual scheme that expresses a worker's view of practice”. A worker should develop a PPM pragmatically over their entire career by reflecting on, and the absorption of, a variety of sources. They are an important basis for the delivery of good practice and the evaluation of such. Bowles, Collingridge, Curry and Valentine stress the importance of deriving the guidelines for good practice from a text such as the Australian Association of Social Workers Code of Ethics.

As the name implies, they are fundamentally personal and idiosyncratic, and to be effective, they must be rationally constructed, by a self-conscious worker. Fook identifies the need to maintain “a broader vision of the mission of social work” to transcend everyday workplace distractions.

Mullen proposes that a PPM should be constructed from both theory and research.

He first detailed the process for using research findings for PPM development in his 1978 publication He proposes a systematic process for reviewing research findings "--- to facilitate individual student and practitioner use of research findings to construct personal working models of social intervention. The methodology is composed of five interrelated steps: (a) identification of substantive findings concerning intervention variables and their effects on clients; (b) identification of the quality and limitations of the evidence; (c) development of summary generalizations; (d) deduction of practice guidelines; and (e) specification of an evaluation plan to monitor the outcomes when practice guidelines are implemented with individual client systems. Social interventions are conceptualized as open systems whose effects on clients are a function of environmental, organizational, intervenor, technological, and focus components in interaction with client qualities. A systems framework serves the heuristic purpose of structuring the research utilization process." p. 45

Mullen presents a detailed description with examples of how theories can be used in PPM in his 1981 and 1988 publications

Mullen describes the dimensions and sub-dimension of a PPM, outlined below. A PPM should include all elements of social work theory, linking what Payne describes as the three tiers; models of practice, explanatory theory and world perspectives.

== Dimensions of the model ==
=== Social Welfare and the Profession ===
This requires a practitioner to have an understanding of the concept of social welfare, and the role of social work within this concept as well as any specialisations of social work.

=== Social Work ===
A practitioner needs to understand the missions and objectives of social work, as well as philosophies that underpin it.

=== Clients ===
A PPM needs to explain how the model centres around clients, and conceptualisation of the clients that is in line with the philosophies of social work.

=== Practitioner ===
The use of self is fundamental to social work, and a practitioner needs to be self-conscious, and know what parts of themselves to use in practice, and which to leave out.

=== Relationship ===
The relationship between client and practitioner is the most crucial workspace in social work, and the context that the relationship occurs is therefore a vital part of a PPM. A practitioner needs to consider which elements of a relationship are important, and which may be contrary to the notion of social work.

=== Agency ===
The strengths and shortfalls of an agency can greatly help or hamper the social work process, and a worker needs to be aware of these to maximise the agency's benefit to the client.

=== Technique ===
The technique a social worker uses is defined by all the preceding dimensions. The processes that a social worker uses needs to be consistent with the orienting theories that form their conception of social work.

=== Monitoring and Evaluation ===
To maintain a validity with a PPM, social workers need a systemic plan that takes into account the relevance and effectiveness of practice.

== Strengths and weaknesses of the concept ==
Payne identified that an eclectic approach to theory has the benefits of increasing a workers effectiveness, but that this should not come at the expense of being “internally inconsistent or debas(ing) the full theory.” Mullen offers several criticisms of PPMs, that they are duplicative, time-consuming and overly subjective. He offers responses to these three points, firstly in refuting the claim that they simply duplicate existing General Practice Models (GPM). A PPM allows for development and tweaking of GPMs, making them more relevant to individual practice. He concedes that they can be time-consuming, but mostly in their inception, and that maintaining and developing them is much easier. As for the subjectivity of a PPM, workers need to be aware of this, and critically engaged with GPMs to bring esoteric theory and research into contact with everyday practice.
