= David Hernandez =

David or Dave Hernandez may refer to:

- David Hernández Pérez (born 1960), Mexican politician
- Dave Hernandez (born 1970), musician best known for playing with the American band The Shins
- David Hernandez (poet) (born 1971), American poet
- David Hernández de la Fuente (born 1974), writer from Spain
- David Hernandez (mathematician), French mathematician, winner of the Jacques Herbrand Prize
- David Hernandez (singer) (born 1983), American singer
- David Hernandez (baseball) (born 1985), American baseball player
- David Hernández Vallín (born 1967), Mexican politician
