= René Sand =

Belgian doctor (1877–1953)

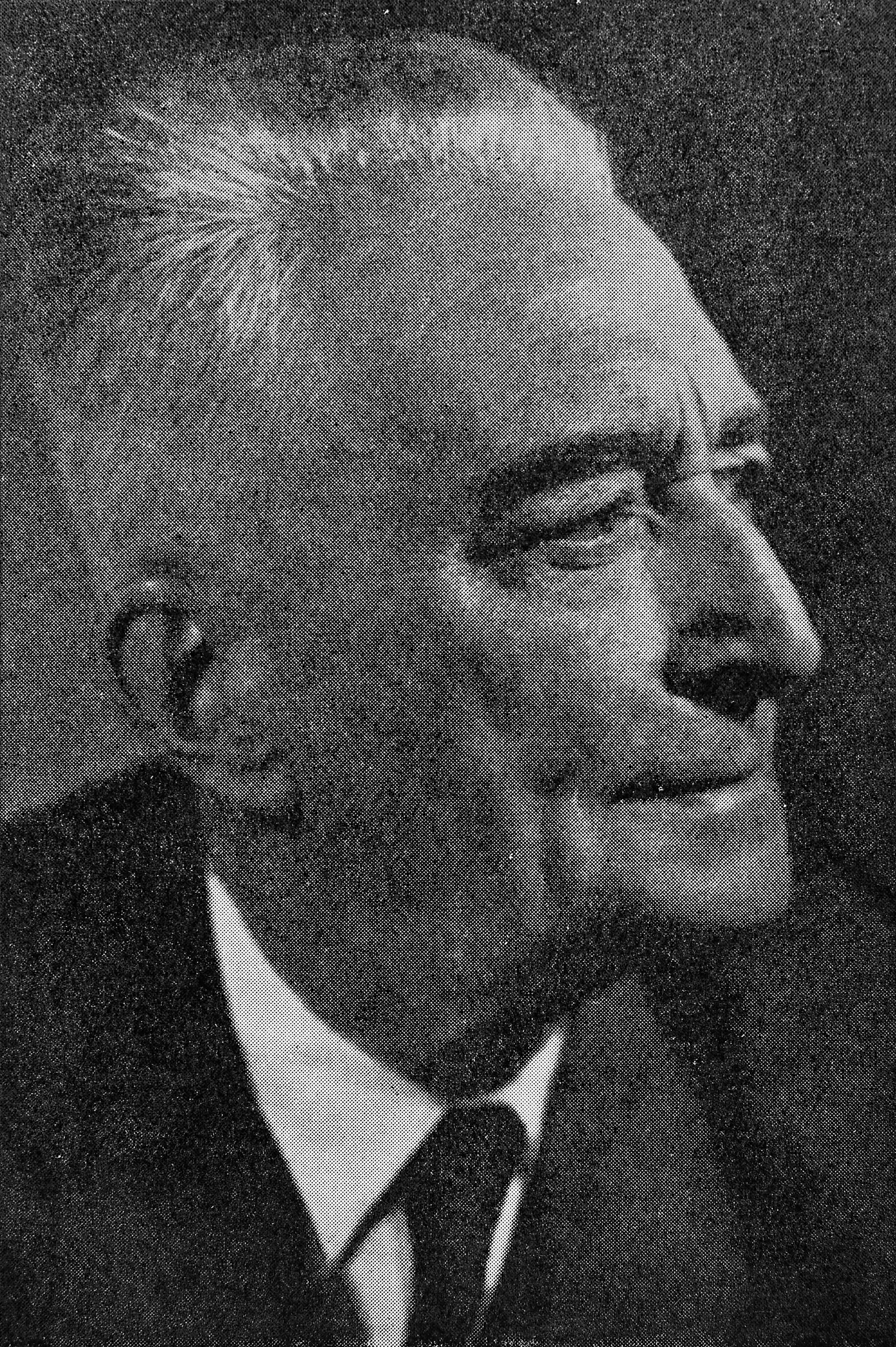
- Born: 3 January 1877; Ixelles
- Died: 23 August 1953 (aged 76); Brussels
- Education: Free University of Brussels
- Awards: Léon Bernard Foundation Prize (1951)
- Scientific career
- Fields: Social Medicine
- Workplaces: Free University of Brussels; Belgian Red Cross; League of Red Cross Societies; World Health Organization
- Thesis: Les fiber pyramidales cortico-bulbaires et cortico-protubérantielles

René Sand (3 January 1877 in Ixelles – 23 August 1953 in Brussels) was a Belgian doctor, social worker, promoter of social medicine, and co-founder of World Health Organization.

Sand studied medicine at the Free University of Brussels and later became interested in social issues in medicine. He worked for the Belgian Red Cross during World War I, and after the war, he became an expert on contemporary trends in social work. He founded the first national training institute for social workers in Belgium and was appointed secretary-general of the League of Red Cross Societies in 1921. Sand was arrested by the Gestapo in September 1944 and sent to Dachau concentration camp. He was freed on 29 April 1945 by American troops.

He also played a significant role in creating the World Health Organization. René Sand died in 1953, and the René Sand Prize was established in his honor.

== Early life and education ==
René Sand was born on 3 January 1877 and grew up in the Brussels district of Ixelles. His father's family was from Luxembourg, and his mother was of French descent. He attended the Institut l'Athénée school in Brussels. He then began studying medicine at the Free University of Brussels, where he won a prize in the university competition in 1898. He studied single-celled organisms in Brittany. In July 1900, he received his medical degree. Between 1901 and 1904, he worked in hospitals in Brussels. He also practised in hospitals in Berlin and Vienna.

In 1903, Sand defended his thesis entitled Les fibre pyramidales cortico-bulbaires et cortico-protubérantielles, after which he was offered a position at the Free University of Brussels.

== Career ==
Sand quickly became a member of several national learned societies, such as the Societe de Médecine légale de France and Société royale des Sciences medicales et naturelles de Bruxelles. At that time, he was the founder and secretary of the Association Belge de Médecine Sociale (since 1913). Then, he became interested in social issues in the field of medicine. As a medical consultant for a large insurance company whose main area of activity was industrial accidents, he gathered knowledge about the situation of workers. He travelled extensively around Belgium to learn about working conditions and occupational hazards.

The outbreak of World War I interrupted his career. At the beginning of the conflict, he worked at the Belgian Red Cross (in an outpatient clinic). Then he went to the Belgian Military Hospital in London.

In 1916, he returned to Belgium, and after the war's end, he travelled several times to the United States, where he analysed Taylorism. In 1919, he published his thoughts in the work La bienfaisance d'hier et la bienfaisance de demain . In it, he demanded the professionalisation of social work. He was also one of the leading figures who rebuilt the Red Cross in Belgium after World War I.

Over time, he became an expert on contemporary trends in social work in the Anglo-Saxon area. In 1919, with several influential figures in Belgium, he decided to found the first national training institute for social workers. This is how the Ecole centrale d'application de service social (later: Institut d'études sociales d'Etat ) was founded in Brussels. In 1924 he went to Chile, where he gave lectures on issues of social medicine and initiated social education in that country.

In 1919, the League of Red Cross Societies was founded, and he was appointed secretary-general in 1921. In July 1928, he was the chief organiser and secretary-general of the First International Social Work Conference in Paris. In addition to an extensive edition of conference papers, which were published in three volumes, René Sand gathered his knowledge of international social work and its contemporary trends in the author's publication Le service social à travers le monde from 1931. In the interwar period, he developed an extensive publishing activity.

In 1936, he became a doctor at the criminological institute of the Free University of Brussels. However, he continued to work in the field of social work. In the permanent organisation that became the International Council on Social Welfare (ICSW). He took the position of ICSW secretary general from 1928 to 1932. He participated in the organization of the Second International Conference of Social Work, which took place in Frankfurt am Main in 1932. From 1930 to the outbreak of World War II, he worked at the Belgian Ministry of Health.

Due to the German occupation of Belgium, he lost his professorship and was arrested by the Gestapo in September 1944. Together with his son-in-law, he was sent to Brauweiler near Cologne, and then was imprisoned in Plansee, Tyrol (subcamp of KL Dachau). He was freed on 29 April 1945 by American troops. He returned to Brussels and, with the support of the Rockefeller Foundation, succeeded in creating the first academic chair for the history of medicine and social medicine at the Free University of Brussels, which he was offered to chair in 1945.

Sand was one of the founders of the International Association of Schools of Social Work (IASSW) and became its president from 1946 to 1953. In 1950, he was appointed chairman of the committee of experts whose aim was to create the World Health Organization (WHO), to which he made a significant contribution and was awarded the Léon Bernard Foundation Prize in 1951.

He was active until the end of his life, and shortly before his death (at the age of 75), he visited the 6th International Social Work Conference held in Madras and published his well-known book The Advance to Social Medicine in 1952. He died unexpectedly on 23 August 1953 in Brussels.

In 1954, the René Sand Prize was founded to commemorate his merits, awarded to a social organization or individual every two years for significant contributions to social work.

== Personal life ==
In 1900, he married Marie-Thérèse Joris, and had three sons and a daughter.
