= Accredited Social Worker =

Accredited Social Workers are Australian graduate social workers who are committed to continuing professional education in a manner recognised by the Australian Association of Social Workers. Achieving accreditation is promoted as beneficial to the ability and effectiveness of the individual worker as well as to the wider society through the pursuit of social justice, the enhancement of the quality of life and the development of the full potential of each individual, group and community in society.

To be accredited, social workers must undertake up to 75 hours of professional development and/or education in a yearly cycle. Activities that count towards these hours include supervision social work students, taking part in training or receiving supervision in the workplace.
