= Kathleen Jones (academic) =

English academic and writer (1922–2010)

- Born: April 7, 1922; London
- Died: October 13, 2010 (aged 88)
- Education: North London Collegiate School; Westfield College
- Occupations: Professor; Author

Kathleen Jones (7 April 1922 – 13 October 2010) was a professor of social policy and Head of Department of Social Policy and Social Work, University of York, 1965–87 and Emeritus Professor after 1987.

She lived in York, England. Jones was educated at the North London Collegiate School and Westfield College, University of London (in Oxford). She worked in WEA and Extra-Mural teaching from 1943 to 1945, and went to work at the University of Manchester after a career break in 1951. She lectured in Social Administration until 1965, when she became Professor of Social Policy in the University of York, a post which she held until 1987. She travelled widely, to most countries in Europe, to North and Central America, to Russia, to China, to Malaysia, to the Middle East, mainly in the interests of mental health research. She was the author of some 22 books, and numerous reports, papers and articles.

== Public service ==
Jones held a range of positions in British public life. She was a member of two Archbishop's Commissions, on the Church and State (1965–70) and Marriage (1968–69). From 1968 to 1970 she sat on both the Social Science Research Council's Sociology Committee and the Central Training Council in Child Care. From 1971 to 1973 she was a member of the Central Council for Education and Training in Social Work.

From 1974 to 1975 Jones sat on Lord Gardiner's Committee on Terrorism and Human Rights. She was the Chair of the Social Sciences Committee for the UK National Committee for UNESCO (1966–68) and the Social Policy Association (1966–69). From 1983 to 1986 she was Regional Chairman of the Mental Health Act Commission.

In studies following the founding of the National Health Service, Jones investigated "the reality of life in hostels and other forms of residential care", arguing that they did not provide improved accommodation to those who needed them.

== Publications ==
=== Books ===
- Lunacy, Law and Conscience (1953)
- Social Welfare in Malaya (1958)
- Mental Health and Social Policy (1960)
- Mental Hospitals at Work (with Roy Sidebotham) (1962)
- The Teaching of Social Studies in British Universities (1965)
- The Compassionate Society (1965)
- A History of the Mental Health Services (1972)
- Opening the Door (with John Brown et al.) (1974)
- Issues in Social Policy (with John Brown and J. R. Bradshaw) (1978)
- Ideas on Institutions (with A. J. Fowles) (1984)
- Eileen Younghusband: a biography (1984)
- Experience in Mental Health (1988)
- Asylums and After (1993)
- Poems of St John of the Cross (1993)
- Butler’s Lives of the Saints, June volume (1997)
- Butler’s Lives of the Saints, December volume (1999)
- Women Saints (1999)
- Saints of the Anglican Calendar (2000)
- The Making of Social Policy in Britain (2001)
- Who Are the Celtic Saints? (2003)
- Songs of the Isles (2004)
- Challenging Richard Dawkins (2007)

=== Other ===
- Book-length research reports for Lord Gardiner’s Committee on Terrorism, Organisation for Economic Co-operation and Development, the Archbishops' Commission on Church and State, the Archbishops' Commission on Marriage, the Department of Health, the Department of the Environment.
- Editor of the Routledge and Kegan Paul Library of Sociology and Social Policy (1964–80) and The Year Book of Social Policy in Britain (1971-6).
- Many papers and articles in The Lancet, British Journal of Psychiatry, New Society, New Statesman.
