= David Hernández de la Fuente =

Spanish writer, translator and university lecturer

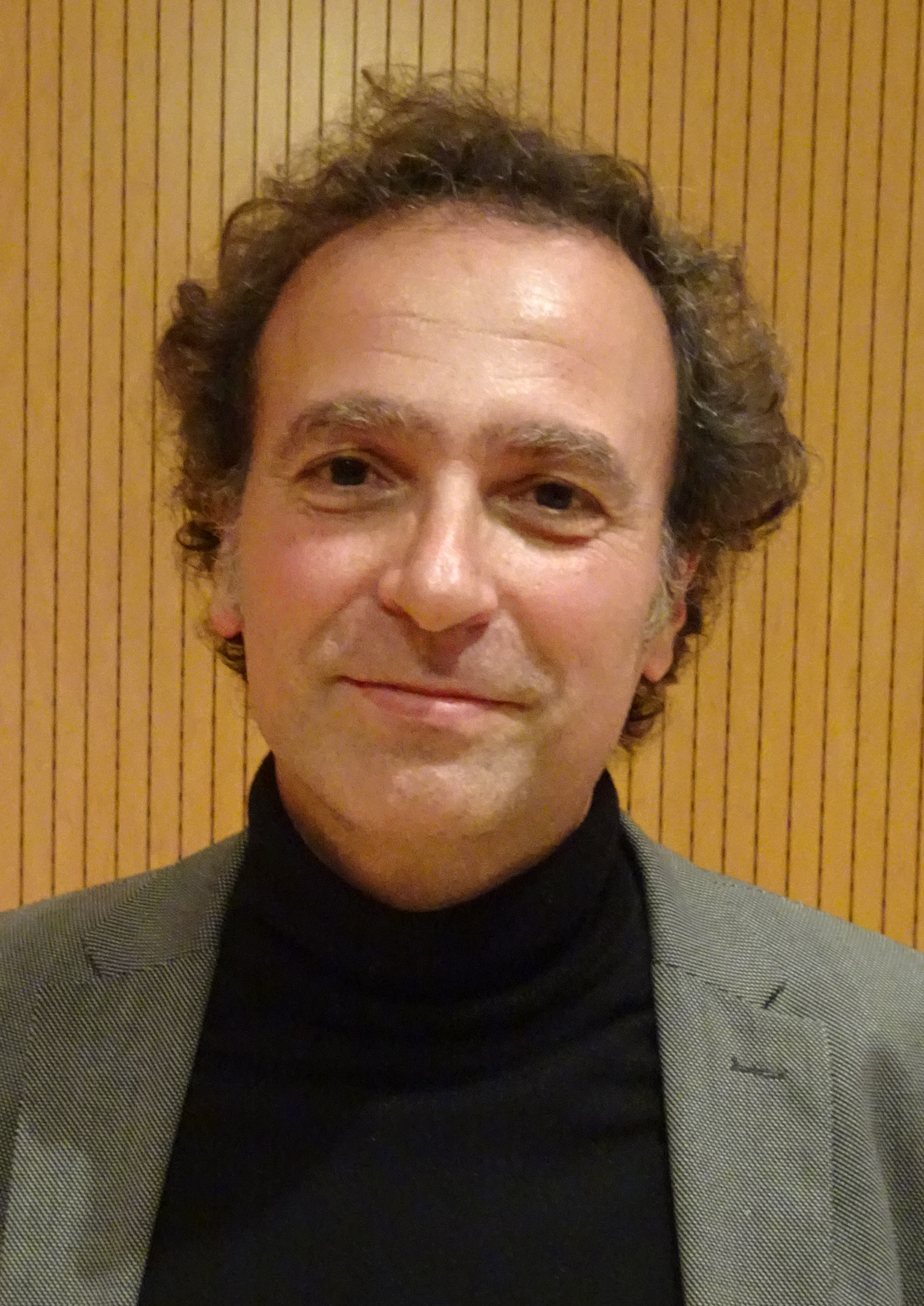
- Born: 1974 (age 51–52); Madrid
- Education: Complutense University of Madrid
- Scientific career
- Fields: Classics
- Workplaces: Complutense University of Madrid
- Website: http://www.davidhdelafuente.com/

David Hernández de la Fuente (born 1974 in Madrid) is a Spanish writer, translator and university lecturer who is specialized in Classics.

== Biography ==
Hernández de la Fuente was born in Madrid in 1974 and he studied at the Complutense University of Madrid. He obtained university degrees in Classics, Spanish Philology and Law from Madrid University and a PhD in Classics (2005), supervised by Carlos García Gual, and Sociology (2011), supervised by Antonio López Peláez and Sagrario Segado Sánchez-Cabezudo. After the completion of his PhD, he has been lecturer of Classical Studies at the Charles III University of Madrid, Fellow of the Humboldt Foundation at the Chair of Ancient History of the University of Potsdam and Professor at the Department of Ancient History at the Spanish National University of Distance Education (UNED). He has been visiting scholar at several European and American universities, such as Columbia University, University of Florence, Paris West University Nanterre La Défense or Free University of Berlin.

Currently, he is Professor of Greek Philology of the Department of Classics at the Complutense University of Madrid.

== Fiction writing ==
David Hernández de la Fuente started his career as fiction writer in 2004 with the book Las puertas del sueño (Madrid, 2005), which was awarded the VIII Young Artists Prize of the Community of Madrid (Spanish Wikipedia) and he has published ever since novels and short stories in literary journals (Barcelona Review, Cuadernos del Matemático) and anthologies (Inmenso estrecho, etc.). His experimental novel Continental (2007) was acclaimed by the critic as the work of "one of the most vigorous representatives of the New Spanish Narrative." He has been awarded the prestigious Valencia Prize for Narrative (Institució Alfons el Magnànim (Spanish Wikipedia), Diputación de Valencia (Spanish Wikipedia)) for his novel A cubierto (Madrid, 2011). Further on he has published the fictional travel diary s/t, and the novels La caverna de las cigarras, El retorno de los Heraclidas and El origen del vellocino de oro .

== Essays and non-fiction ==
Hernández de la Fuente has authored several books on Classics and the Ancient World such as Oráculos griegos (2008), De Galatea a Barbie (2010), Las máscaras del hidalgo (2010), Vidas de Pitágoras (2011), Breve historia de Bizancio (2011) Historia del pensamiento político griego (2014) or Civilización Griega (2014) among others. He has won unanimous praise from both the public and the critics for his non-fiction writing on Classical Literature and its reception in the modern world. His popular monograph on Pythagoras, with two editions, has been appointed "Book of the Year" by the cultural supplement of El País. His last essay on Dionysos and Ariadne El despertar del alma (2017) has also won praise from both scholars and literary critics. Moreover, he has edited collective monographs such as New Perspectives on Late Antiquity (2011) or The Theodosian Age (AD 379–455): Power, Place, Belief and Learning at the End of the Western Empire (2013) and authored numerous scientific articles in peer-reviewed journals. Hernández de la Fuente has edited, translated into Spanish and commented Classical authors such as Nonnus of Panopolis, Plutarch, Plato or Pindar.

== Literary criticism ==
He regularly collaborates in several journals of literature, history and literary criticism (Cuadernos Hispanoamericanos, Revista de Libros, etc.) and in daily newspapers such as La Razón. Hernández de la Fuente has authored numerous articles of popular science regarding the Ancient World and he is advisor for Classical Antiquity at the magazine Historia National Geographic (Spanish Wikipedia).

== Awards and fellowships ==
- Prize for Young Narrative. Community of Madrid (2004) for the book Las puertas del sueño.
- Prize of the Pastor Foundation for Classical Studies (2005)
- Fellowship of the Humboldt Foundation (2009)
- "Valencia" Prize for Narrative. Institució Alfons el Magnànim (Province of Valencia (2010) for the book A cubierto.
- Vidas de Pitágoras: Book of the Year (Biographies) in El País (2011)
- Burgen Scholarship Award 2014. Academia Europaea
- Prize "Acción Cívica" for Humanities (2022)

== Works ==
=== Fiction ===
- El origen del vellocino de oro (Mitología. Gredos-RBA, Barcelona 2017). ISBN 978-84-473-8894-3.
- El regreso de los Heraclidas (Mitología. Gredos-RBA, Barcelona 2017). ISBN 978-84-473-9099-1.
- La caverna de las cigarras (Literaturas Com Libros, Madrid 2011). ISBN 978-84-939184-9-1.
- s/t (s/t, Berlin 2011). ISBN 978-3-9814768-0-4.
- A cubierto (Nowtilus, Madrid 2011). ISBN 978-84-99671-85-7.
- Continental (Kailas, Madrid 2007). ISBN 978-84-89624-33-7.
- 'El último dálmata' in Inmenso estrecho. Cuentos sobre inmigración (Kailas, Madrid 2005 y Puzzle, Madrid 2006). ISBN 978-84-934491-3-1 and ISBN 978-84-89746-08-4 (pocket).
- Las puertas del sueño (Kailas, Madrid, 2005). ISBN 978-84-934072-7-8. Second edition (Musa a las 9, Madrid 2011 ISBN 978-84-15222-07-1).

=== Non-fiction ===
- Prolegómenos a una ciencia de la antigüedad Editorial Síntesis, Madrid 2023). ISBN 978-84-1357-238-3
- El hilo de oro. Los clásicos en el laberinto de hoy (Editorial Ariel, Madrid 2021). ISBN 978-84-344-3349-6
- El despertar del alma. Dioniso y Ariadna: Mito y Misterio, (Editorial Ariel, Barcelona 2017). ISBN 9788434425835.
- Breve historia política del mundo clásico (with Pedro Barceló), (Escolar y Mayo editores, Madrid 2017). ISBN 9788416020973.
- Mitología clásica (Alianza Editorial, Madrid 2015). ISBN 978-84-9104-029-3.
- El mito de Orfeo. Motivos, símbolos y tradición literaria (with Carlos García Gual), (Fondo de Cultura Económica, Madrid 2014). ISBN 978-84-375-0718-7.
- Civilización Griega (con Raquel López Melero), (Alianza Editorial, Madrid 2014). ISBN 978-84-206-9343-9.
- Breve Historia de Bizancio (Alianza Editorial, Madrid 2014). ISBN 978-84-2068334-8.
- Vidas de Pitágoras (Ediciones Atalanta, Vilaür 2011). ISBN 978-84-938466-6-4. Revised second edition (Ediciones Atalanta, Vilaür 2014. ISBN 978-84-940941-7-0.).
- Las máscaras del hidalgo (Delirio Ediciones, Salamanca 2010). ISBN 978-84-937495-7-6. Revised 2nd ed. (Guillermo Escolar Editor, Madrid 2022). ISBN 978-84-18981-65-4.
- Bakkhos Anax. Un estudio sobre Nono de Panópolis (Nueva Roma, 30, CSIC, Madrid 2008). ISBN 978-84-00-08693-0
- Oráculos griegos (Alianza Editorial, Madrid 2008). ISBN 978-84-206-6263-3
- La mitología contada con sencillez (Maeva, Madrid, 2005). ISBN 978-84-96231-52-8
- Lovecraft. Una mitología (ELR, Madrid, 2004). ISBN 978-84-87607-13-4. Revised 2nd ed. Editorial Materia oscura, Madrid 2017. ISBN 978-84-943945-3-9.

=== Edited books ===
- Shaping the "Divine Man" Holiness, Charisma and Leadership in the Graeco-Roman World (edited with Marco Alviz Fernández), Franz Steiner Verlag, Stuttgart 2023. ISBN 978-3-515-13398-2
- Breve historia política del mundo clásico (edited with Pedro Barceló) (Escolar y Mayo editores, Madrid 2017). ISBN 9788416020973.
- De ὅρος a limes: el concepto de frontera en el mundo antiguo y su recepción (edited with Marco Alviz Fernández), (Escolar y Mayo editores, Madrid 2017). ISBN 9788417134037.
- De Orfeo a David Lynch: Mito, Simbolismo y Recepción. Ensayos y ficciones (edited with Fernando Broncano), (Escolar y Mayo editores, Madrid 2015). ISBN 978-84-16020-47-8.
- New Perspectives on Late Antiquity in the Eastern Roman Empire (edited with Ana de Francisco Heredero and Susana Torres Prieto), (Cambridge Scholars Publishing, Newcastle 2014). ISBN 978-1-4438-6395-7.
- Historia del pensamiento político griego: teoría y praxis (with Pedro Barceló), (Editorial Trotta, Madrid 2014). ISBN 978-84-9879-540-0.
- El espejismo del bárbaro. Ciudadanos y extranjeros al final de la Antigüedad (edited with David Álvarez Jiménez and Rosa Sanz Serrano), (Biblioteca Potestas, n.1, Universitat Jaume I, Castellón 2013). ISBN 978-84-8021-913-6
- The Theodosian Age (AD 379–455): Power, Place, Belief and Learning at the End of the Western Empire (edited with Rosa García-Gasco and Sergio González Sánchez), (Archaeopress, Oxford 2013). ISBN 978-1-4073-1107-4
- De Prometeo a Frankenstein: autómatas, ciborgs y otras creaciones más que humanas (edited with Fernando Broncano), (Ediciones Evohé, Madrid 2012). ISBN 978-84-15415-19-0.
- New Perspectives on Late Antiquity (ed.), (Cambridge Scholars Publishing, Newcastle 2011). ISBN 978-1-4438-2718-8
- De Galatea a Barbie: Autómatas, robots y otras figuras de la construcción femenina (edited with Fernando Broncano), (Lengua de Trapo, Madrid 2010). ISBN 978-84-8381-068-2
- Cuadernos del abismo: homenaje a H.P. Lovecraft (edited with Fernando Broncano), (Literaturas.Com Libros, Madrid 2008). ISBN 978-84-612-3962-7. Revised second edition (Literaturas Com Libros, Madrid 2009). ISBN 978-84-613-2333-3
- Oráculos griegos (Alianza Editorial, Madrid 2008). ISBN 978-84-206-6263-3

=== Translations ===
- Nicos Cavadías, La Cruz del Sur. Poesía completa, Alianza Editorial, Madrid, 2021. ISBN 978-84-1362-245-3
- Pedro Barceló, Alejandro Magno, Alianza Editorial, Madrid, 2011. ISBN 978-84-206-5350-1
- Nonnus, Dionisíacas. Cantos XXXVII-XLVIII (Biblioteca Clásica Gredos, 370), Editorial Gredos, Madrid, 2008. ISBN 978-84-249-0214-8
- Plutarch, Vidas paralelas. Vol. V: Cimón-Lúculo (Biblioteca Clásica Gredos, 362), Editorial Gredos, Madrid, 2007. ISBN 978-84-249-2870-4
- Bryan Ward-Perkins, La caída de Roma y el fin de la civilización (trans. with Manuel Cuesta), Espasa-Calpe, Madrid, 2007. ISBN 978-84-670-2363-3
- Nonnus, Dionisíacas. Cantos XXV-XXXVI (Biblioteca Clásica Gredos, 319), Editorial Gredos, Madrid, 2004. ISBN 978-84-249-2703-5
- Cantar de Ruodlieb, Celeste, Madrid 2002. ISBN 978-84-8211-339-5. Revised second edition (Musa a las 9, Madrid 2010 ISBN 978-84-15222-02-6)
- Nonnus, Dionisíacas. Cantos XIII-XXIV (Biblioteca Clásica Gredos, 286), Editorial Gredos, Madrid, 2001. ISBN 978-84-249-2288-7
