= International Social Work =

- Discipline: Social Work
- Language: English
- Edited by: Professor Vasilios Ioakimidis

Publication details
- Former name: Formerly (until 1958): Social Welfare in South-East-Asia
- History: 1957–present
- Publisher: SAGE Publications
- Frequency: Bi-monthly
- Impact factor: 0.573 (2016)

Standard abbreviations
- ISO 4: Int. Soc. Work

Indexing
- ISSN: 0020-8728 (print); 1461-7234 (web)
- LCCN: sa64007476
- OCLC no.: 475400860

Links
- Journal homepage; Online access; Online archive

International Social Work is a peer-reviewed academic journal that publishes papers in the field of social work. The journal is edited by Professor Patrick O'Leary (Griffith University, Australia) and Professor Ming-sum TSUI (Caritas Institute of Higher Education, Hong Kong). It has been in publication since 1957 and is currently published by SAGE Publications on behalf of the International Association of Schools of Social Work (IASSW), the International Council on Social Welfare (ICSW) and the International Federation of Social Workers (IFSW); each of whom have equal ownership of the journal.

== Scope ==
International Social Work is a journal which strives to extend knowledge and promote communication in the fields of social development, social welfare and human services. It has a particular focus on a selection of key international themes in the delivery of services and the education of social workers.

== Abstracting and indexing ==
International Social Work is abstracted and indexed in, among other databases: Academic Search Premier, the British Education Index, Current Contents, the International Bibliography of the Social Sciences, SCOPUS, and the Social Sciences Citation Index. According to the Journal Citation Reports, its 2016 impact factor is 0.573, ranking it 35th out of 42 journals in the category 'Social Work'.
