= International Council on Social Welfare =

Social welfare organization

The International Council on Social Welfare (ICSW) is a non-governmental organization whose activity is focused on undertaking research and organizing consultations for technical assistance and policy development aimed at improving social welfare, social justice and social development at the country and international levels.

== History ==
The ICSW has its origins in 1928 when the International Conference on Social Work, its immediate predecessor, was born in Paris, with the aim of strengthening cooperation between various countries in promoting human welfare. The first Conference had a high proportion of women participating in its preparation and discussions, with nearly two-thirds of the attendees being women. Alice Masarykova, the President of the Czechoslovak Red Cross, was elected as the first President of the International Conference on Social Work and René Sand became the first Secretary General. The International Association of Schools of Social Work (IASSW) and the International Federation of Social Workers (IFSW) also have their origins in the International Conference on Social Work. Moreover, the three participate in the publication of the journal International Social Work with SAGE Publications.

Since its founding in 1928, ICSW has focused its activity on promoting social welfare, technical assistance and knowledge creation, both locally and globally. ICSW actively contributes to international debates and meetings on social welfare, such as the World Summit for Social Development held in Copenhagen in 1995, where strong leadership was proven; the United Nations Commission for Social Development (CSocD), which has among its main purposes the development and implementation of the Copenhagen Declaration and Programme of Action, with ICSW having consultative status with the CSocD; The Global Agenda for Social Work and Social Development (2010); or the 2022 Global People's Summit

== ICSW organisational structure ==
The main organs of the organization are the General Assembly, the Supervisory and Advisory Board, and the Management Committee. The General Assembly is responsible for adopting the four-year global program and the biennial budgetary framework, as well as electing the President, Vice President, Treasurer and two other members of the Management Committee. The term is for approximately four years.

The current president (2025-2028) is Dr. Sergei Zelenev. The past president (2020-2024) is Dr. Sang-Mok Suh, past president of the Korea National Council on Social Welfare and Minister of Health and Welfare in the Korean Government in 1993-95.

The ICSW Executive Director position is currently occupied by Dr. Antonio López Peláez, Professor of Social Work and Social Services at the National Distance Education University (UNED), Spain.
