= Rod McNaughton =

Entrepreneurship educator and academic

Rod B. McNaughton
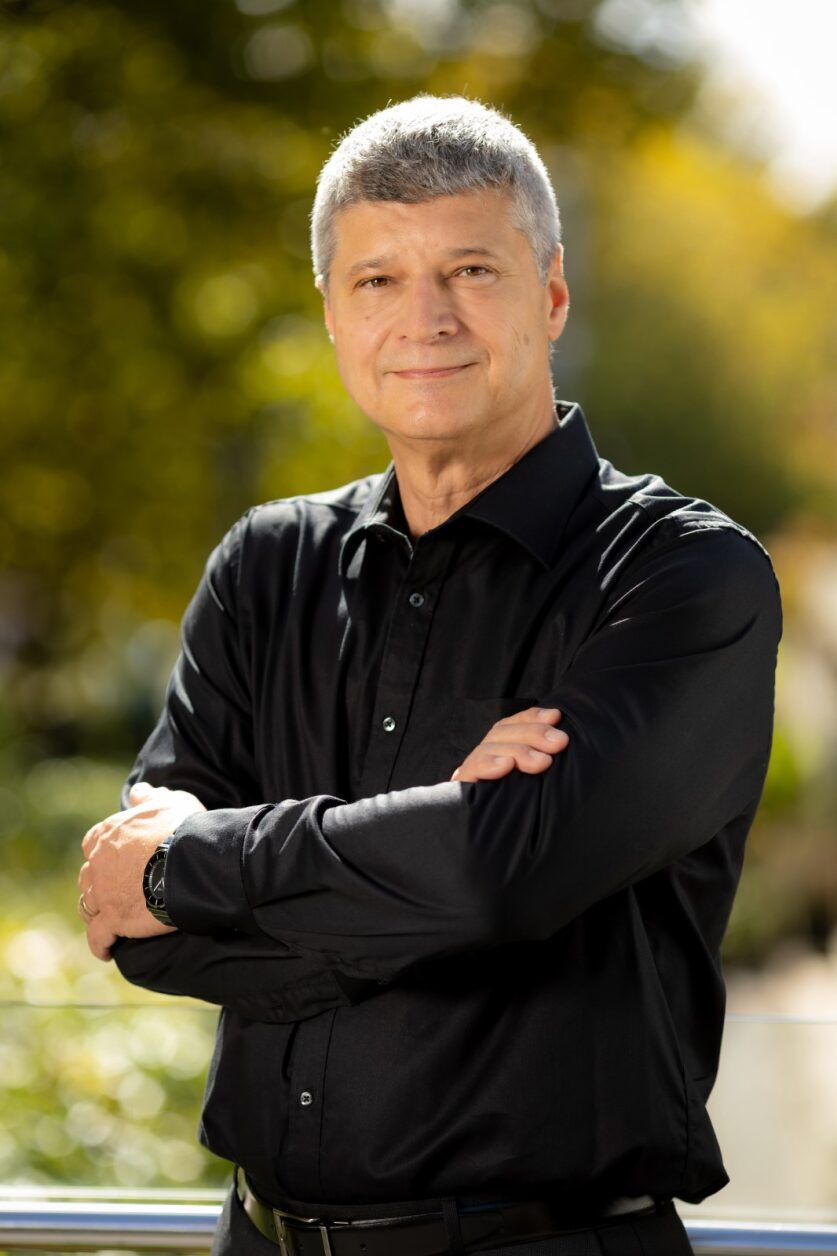
- Professor Rod McNaughton in 2025
- Title: Professor at the University of Auckland

Academic background
- Education: Wilfrid Laurier University (BA (Hons)); University of Western Ontario (MA, PhD); Lancaster University (PhD)
- Thesis: A transaction cost analysis of channel integration in foreign markets by Canadian computer software firms (1997)

Academic work
- Discipline: Management and International Business
- Institutions: University of Auckland; University of Waterloo; University of Otago; University of Lethbridge

Rod B. McNaughton is a New Zealand-Canadian academic, author, and entrepreneurship educator. McNaughton's research focuses on international entrepreneurship, entrepreneurial ecosystems and entrepreneurship education.

McNaughton has been a professor in Management and International Business at the University of Auckland since 2013. Other academic positions held at the University include Academic Director for the Centre for Innovation and Entrepreneurship and Director for Innovation and Professional Development.

== Early life and education ==
McNaughton earned a Bachelor of Arts (Hons) in Geography at Wilfrid Laurier University. He later completed a Master's degree and a PhD in Economic Geography at Western University, focusing on venture capital investment in the United States and Canada, respectively.

In 1997, McNaughton finished his second PhD at the University of Lancaster.

== Career ==
McNaughton's first academic appointment came in 1989 as an assistant professor in the Department of Geography at the University of Lethbridge.

After a brief tenure in New Zealand at the University of Otago as a Professor of Marketing, McNaughton returned to Canada in 2001 to join the University of Waterloo as a professor. During his time there, McNaughton held the Eyton Chair in Entrepreneurship and served as the Director of the Conrad School of Entrepreneurship and Business. As of 2025, McNaughton continues to serve as an adjunct professor in both the Conrad School and the Department of Management Science and Engineering.

In 2013, McNaughton returned to New Zealand. He became Head of the Department for Management and International Business at the University of Auckland in 2015. He has since held additional leadership roles, including Deputy Dean of the Faculty of Business and Economics (2017–2019), Director of the Graduate School of Management (2021), Co-Director of Ngā Ara Whetū, the University's Centre for Climate, Biodiversity and Society (2023-2024), and Academic Director for the Centre for Innovation and Entrepreneurship (2014–present).

Throughout his academic career, McNaughton has contributed to research on international business strategy and market entry dynamics. He has authored or co-authored over 125 unique publications in refereed journal articles and books.

McNaughton is a Chartered Member of the New Zealand Institute of Directors and has served on multiple boards, including as a trustee of the International Centre for Entrepreneurship Foundation (ICE), which oversees The Icehouse, a prominent provider of growth services and investment for New Zealand startups.

In 2026, McNaughton and Dr Andrew Lensen won the Universities New Zealand Critic and Conscience of Society Award. Their work was recognised for "reframing the New Zealand debates on AI and on entrepreneurship".

== Selected works ==
- Darroch, Jenny; McNaughton, Rod (2002). "Examining the link between knowledge management practices and types of innovation". Journal of Intellectual Capital. 3 (3). MCB UP Ltd: 210–222. doi:10.1108/14691930210435570. ISSN 1469-1930.
- Bell, Jim; McNaughton, Rod; Young, Stephen; Crick, Dave (2003). "Towards an integrative model of small firm internationalisation". Journal of International Entrepreneurship. 1 (4). Kluwer Academic Publishers: 339–362. doi:10.1023/A:1025629424041.
- Pellegrino, Juan M; McNaughton, Rod B (2017). "Beyond learning by experience: The use of alternative learning processes by incrementally and rapidly internationalizing SMEs". International Business Review. 26 (4). Pergamon: 614–627. doi:10.1016/j.ibusrev.2016.12.003.
