= Sang-Mok Suh =

South Korean politician (born 1947)

Sang-Mok Suh (Korean: 서상목; born 11 July 1947) is a South Korean politician serving as the Global President of the International Council on Social Welfare (ICWS).

== Biography ==
Sang-Mok Suh received his B.A. in economics and mathematics from Amherst College in 1969 and his Ph.D. in economics from Stanford University in 1974. He worked, during 1973–78, for the World Bank as an economist, and during 1978–88, for the Korea Development Institute (KDI).

He served as 29th Minister of Health and Welfare in the Korean Government (1993–95), and as a high-level advisory board member to the UN Secretary General on Sustainable Development.

He was president of the Korea National Council on Social Welfare (KNCSW) in 2017–2022, period in which the KNCSW has obtained an excellent rating in the evaluation of the management of public institutions. It was during his tenure that the COVID-19 pandemic outbreak occurred, and he played an active role in proposing solutions to mitigate its effects in South Korea. In this regard, he has also stated as a priority the need to reform the South Korean pension and welfare provision system.
