= Centro de Investigaciones Sociológicas =

Spanish research institute (founded 1963)

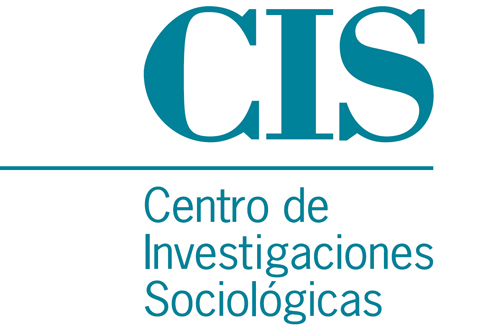

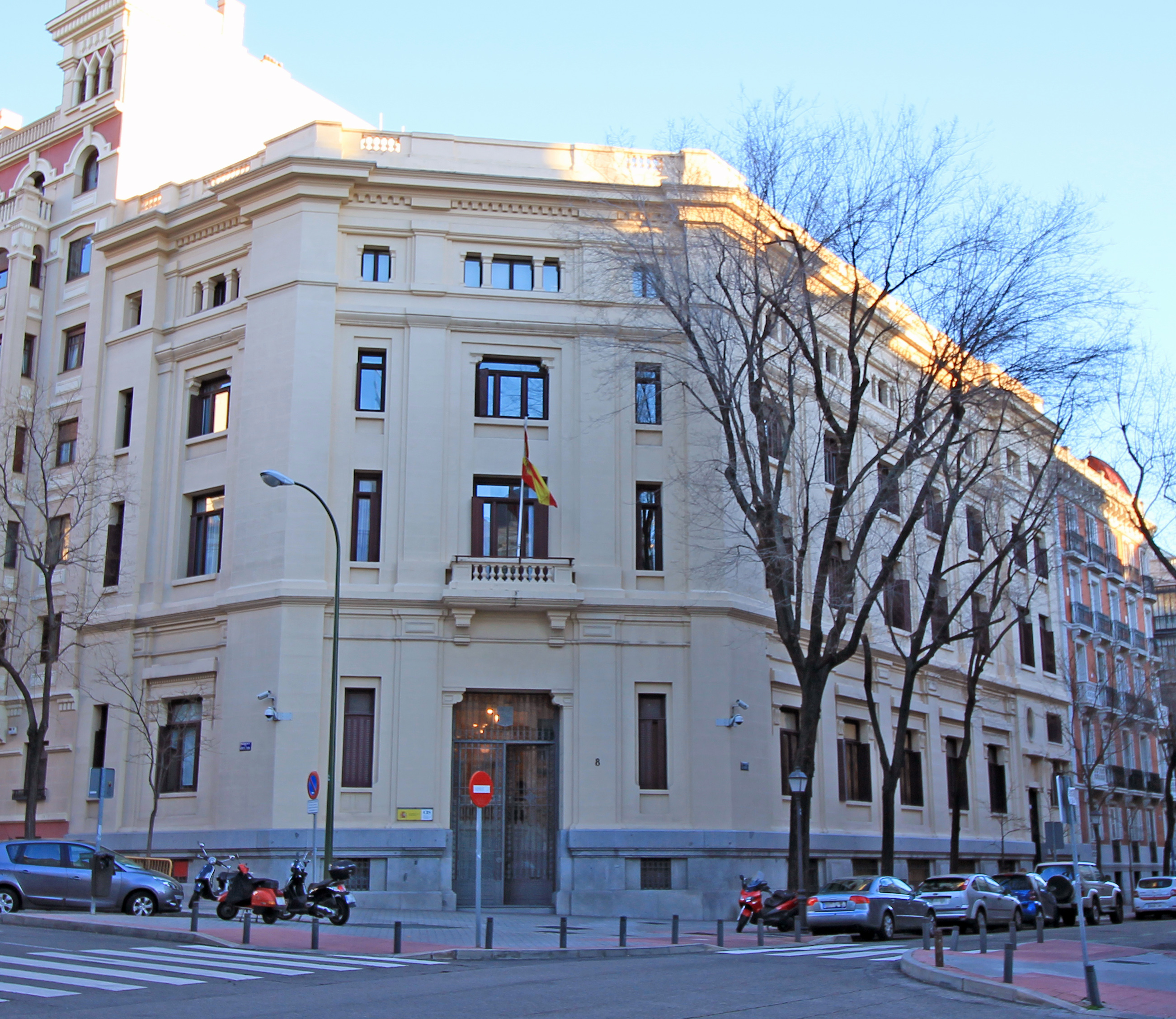
- Head office of the institute in Madrid
- Formation: January 3, 1963; 63 years ago
- Type: Governmental organization
- Purpose: Public research institute
- Headquarters: Montalbán, 8 Madrid
- Coordinates: 40.4179°N 3.6903°W
- Region served: Nation-wide
- Affiliations: Ministerio de la Presidencia
- Budget: €12.7 million, 2023
- Website: cis.es
- Formerly called: Instituto de la Opinión Pública

The Centro de Investigaciones Sociológicas (Centre for Sociological Research), or CIS, is a Spanish public research institute. It was founded in 1963 as the Instituto de la Opinión Pública, and after the 1977 Spanish general election acquired its present name. The institute publishes the Revista Española de Investigaciones Sociológicas and various series of books.

== List of presidents ==
- Luis González Seara (July 1963 – October 1967)
- Salustiano del Campo (October 1967 – January 1971)
- Ramón Cercós Bolaños (January 1971 – 1972)
- Alejandro Muñoz-Alonso Ledo (1972 – July 1973)
- Rafael Ansón Orliart (July 1973 – February 1974)
- Francisco Murillo Ferrol (February 1974 – October 1974)
- Pablo Sela Hoffmann (January 1975 – March 1976)
- Luis López-Ballesteros y Cervino (April 1976 – October 1976)
- Juan Díez Nicolás (October 1976 – April 1979)
- Rafael López Pintor (April 1979 – January 1983)
- Julián Santamaría Ossorio (January 1983 – March 1987)
- Rosa Conde (March 1987 – July 1988)
- Luis Rodríguez Zúñiga (September 1988 – 4 May 1991)
- Joaquín Arango Vila-Belda (July 1991 – May 1996)
- Pilar del Castillo Vera (May 1996 — April 2000)
- Ricardo Montoro (May 2000 – May 2004)
- Fernando Vallespín (May 2004 – May 2008)
- Belén Barreiro (May 2008 – September 2010)
- Ramón Ramos Torre (September 2010 – January 2012)
- Félix Requena Santos (January 2012 – December 2016)
- Cristóbal Torres Albero (December 2016 – June 2018)
- José Félix Tezanos (since June 2018)
