= Eileen Younghusband =

British social worker

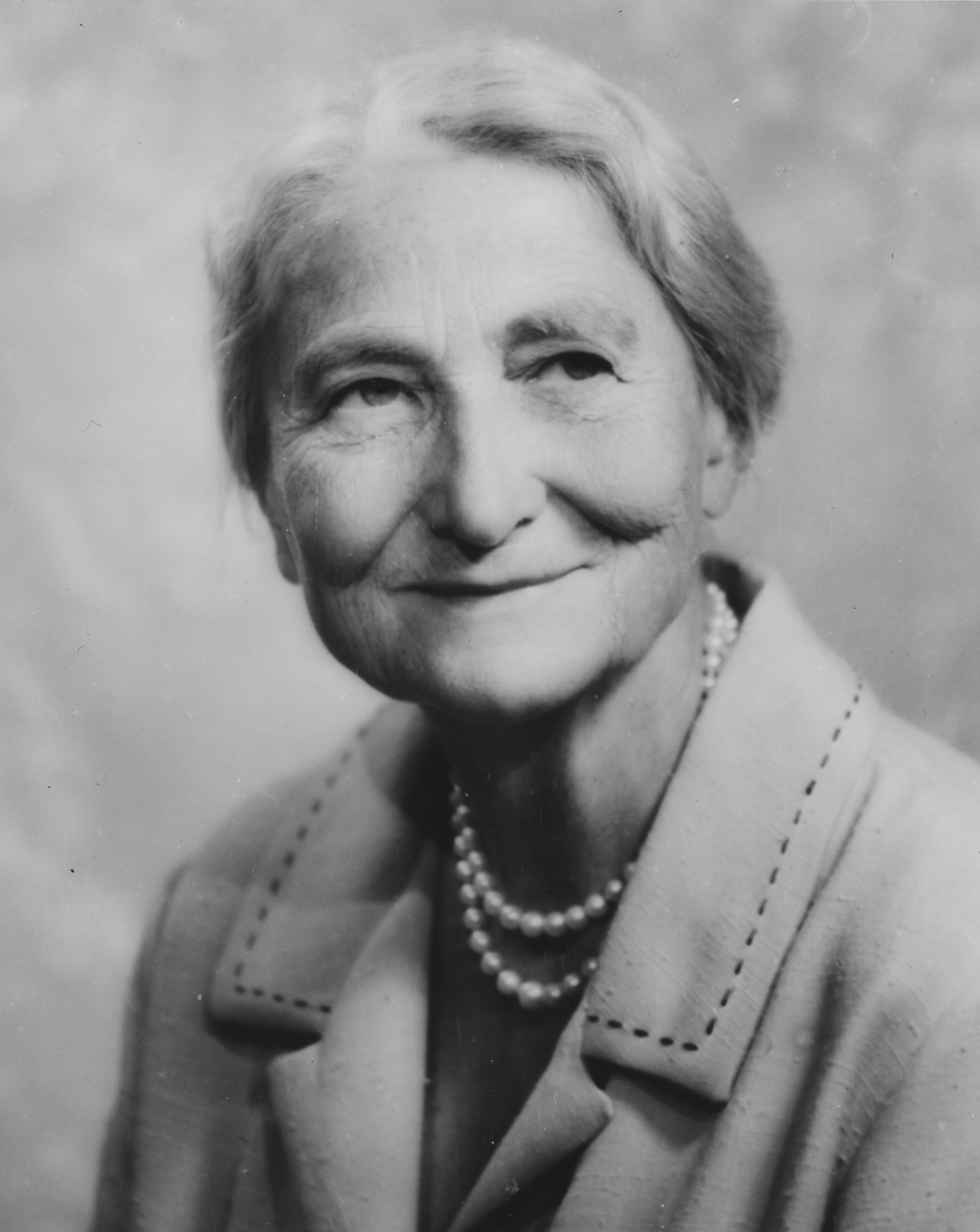
Dame Eileen Younghusband, 1970s.

Dame Eileen Louise Younghusband, DBE (1 January 1902 – 22 May 1981) was a British social worker, researcher, and teacher in the field of social work.

== Early life ==
Her father was Sir Francis Younghusband (1863–1942), a British explorer and mystic famous for his discoveries in Central Asia and his leadership of the British Tibet campaign of 1903–04. She was a student at the London School of Economics 1926–29, and a member of staff 1944–1958.

== Professional contributions ==
In her Carnegie Reports of 1947 and 1950 she advocated "generic" training – a set of core knowledge common to all social workers. In 1954 she pioneered the teaching of a generic course that was to become the prototype of professional social work training in other universities.

In 1955 she chaired a Ministry of Health working party on the provision of training for social workers, a rapidly expanding profession but with little opportunity for formal training. The subsequent Younghusband Report, which was published in May 1959, led to the establishment of the Council for Training in Social Work. During the 1960s, Younghusband served as a Committee Member of the Council for Training in Social Work.

In 1968 Younghusband chaired the Calouste Gulbenkian Foundation's report, Community Work and Social Change.

== Honours ==
She was appointed MBE in 1946, CBE in 1955, and DBE in 1964.

Eileen Younghusband was also active at an international level, initially through the British Council and the UN, and from 1950 through the International Association of Schools of Social Work (IASSW), initially as board member and from 1961 onwards as (honorary) president. She made it her task to promote high standards of social work education across the globe. She is still honoured by the IASSW through the biennial Eileen Younghusband memorial lectures (inaugurated 1984) at the global IASSW conference, when a current social work educator is invited to speak at the IASSW conference on a topic of relevance to international social work.

== Death ==
Younghusband died in 1981, in a car accident in Raleigh, North Carolina, while on a lecture tour in the United States; she was 79 years old.

== Publications ==
Eileen Younghusband's publications include:

- The Education and Training of Social Workers (1947)
- Social Work in Britain (1951)
- Social work in Britain, 1950–1975: a follow-up study (1978).

== Biography ==
- Eileen Younghusband: A Biography, Issue 76 of Occasional papers on social administration; ISSN 0473-7520 by Prof. Kathleen Jones,

Contributor National Council for Voluntary Organisations (Great Britain), Bedford Square Press/NCVO (1984); ISBN 0719911389, 9780719911385
