= José Félix Tezanos =

Spanish politician and professor (born 1946)

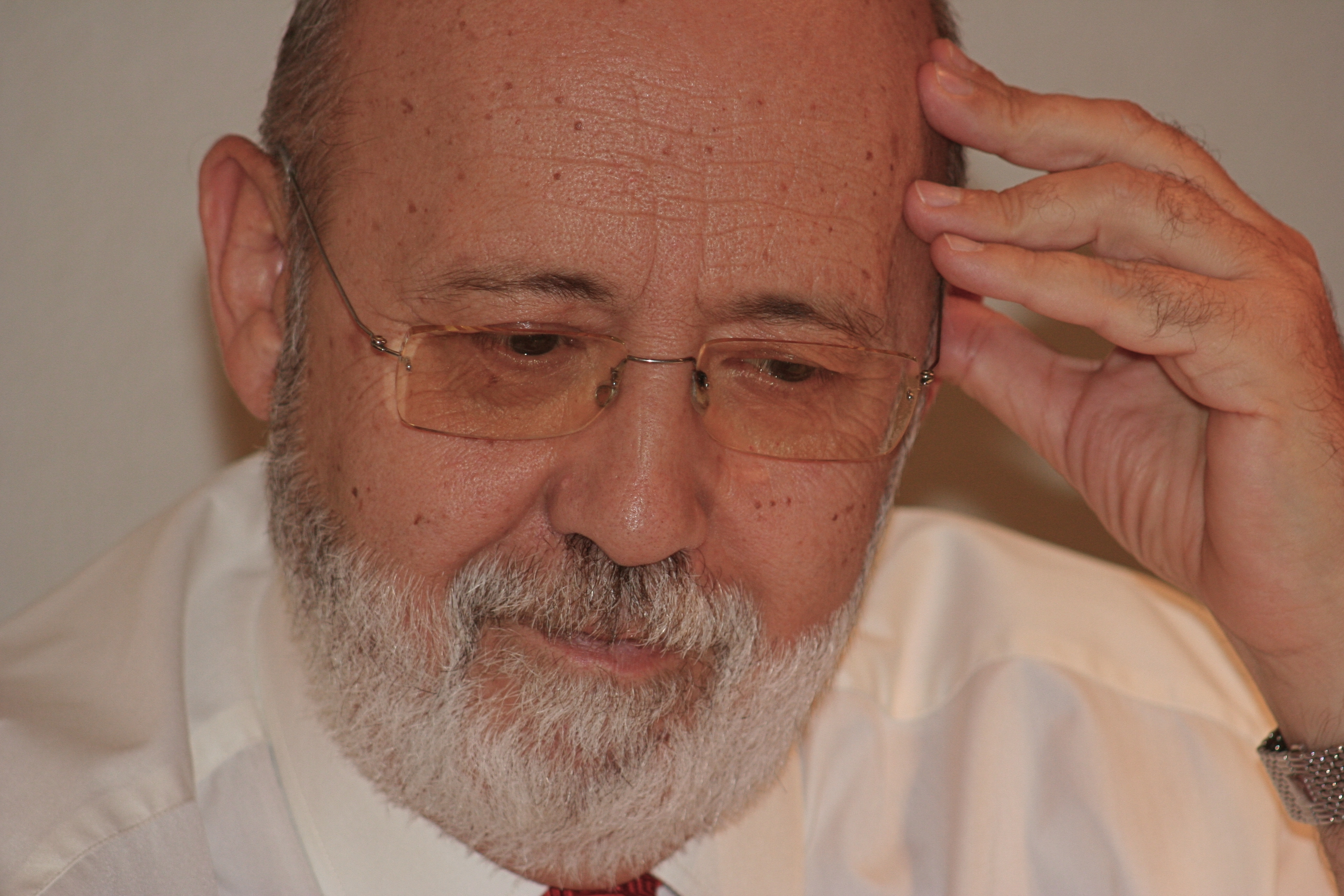

Personal details
- Born: 5 August 1946 (age 80) Santander, Spain
- Citizenship: Spanish
- Party: Spanish Socialist Workers' Party (since 1973)
- Occupation: Sociologist, professor, politician

José Félix Tezanos Tortajada (born 5 August 1946) is a Spanish sociologist, politician, and professor. He serves as political president of the Centro de Investigaciones Sociológicas (CIS) since 2018.

== Biography ==
Born on 5 August 1946 in Santander, Spain, Tezanos obtained a PhD degree in Political Science and Sociology at the Complutense University of Madrid (UCM). He became a member of the Spanish Socialist Workers' Party (PSOE) in 1973, and became linked to the guerrista faction within the party.

Tezanos has held the chair of Sociology at the University of Santiago de Compostela (USC) and the National University of Distance Education (UNED), where he founded and launched the Faculty of Political Science and Sociology, of which he was the first Dean. Prior to the latter, he taught at the Faculty of Political Science and Sociology at the Complutense University of Madrid (from 1974 to 1986). He has supervised nearly 20 theses, including the thesis of Antonio López Peláez (2001), entitled Nuevas tecnologías y sociedad actual: el impacto de la robótica. Tezanos joined the Federal Executive Commission of the PSOE following the 39th Congress of the party in 2017 in the capacity of Secretary responsible for Studies and Programs.

Following the accession of Pedro Sánchez to the position of Prime Minister in June 2018, Tezanos asked to end his role as secretary of Studies and Programs in the Federal Executive Commission to focus on his newly appointed post as president of the CIS, the public institute for sociological research directly dependent on the Ministry of Presidency.

== Works ==
- —(1968). El bachillerato ¿para qué? Encuesta sobre problemas de la enseñanza media. Madrid: Edicusa.
- —(1973). Las nuevas clases medias. Conflicto y conciencia de clase entre los empleados de Banca (junto con J. López, J.L. Rodríguez y R. Domínguez). Madrid: Edicusa.
- —(1975). Estructura de clases en la España actual. Madrid: Edicusa.
- —(1977). Alienación, dialéctica y libertad. Valencia: Fernando Torres.
- —(1977). La cuestión regional española (junto con Salustiano del Campo y Manuel Navarro). Madrid: Edicusa.
- —(1978). Estructura de clases y conflictos de poder en la España postfranquista. Madrid: Edicusa.
- —(1982). ¿Crisis de la conciencia obrera?. Madrid: Mezquita.
- —(1983). Sociología del socialismo español. Madrid: Tecnos.
- —(1987). La vivienda en la Comunidad Valenciana (junto con Manuel Navarro y J.M. Bernabé). Valencia: Generalitat Valenciana.
- —(1987). La explicación sociológica (2ª edición revisada y ampliada de 1996). Madrid: UNED.
- —(1987). La democratización del trabajo. Madrid: Editorial Sistema.
- —(1988). Los trabajadores industriales ante las nuevas tecnologías (junto con Antonio Santos). Madrid: CIS.
- —(1988). La sociedad española en transformación. Madrid: Editorial Siglo XXI. Programa 2000.
- —(1989). La transición democrática española (junto a Andrés de Blas y Ramón Cotarelo). Madrid: Editorial Sistema.
- —(1991). Guía didáctica de Sociología (junto con Fernando Reinares). Madrid: UNED.
- —(1992). La década del cambio (junto a Alfonso Guerra). Madrid: Editorial Sistema.
- —(1992). Escritos de Teoría Sociológica. Homenaje a Luis Rodríguez Zúñiga (junto con Carlos Moya, Alfonso Pérez Agote y Juan Salcedo). Madrid: CIS.
- —(1994). Historia Ilustrada del Socialismo Español. Madrid: Editorial Sistema.
- —(1994). La Socialdemocracia ante la economía de los años ochenta (ed.). Madrid: Editorial Sistema.
- —(1996). La democracia post-liberal (ed.). Madrid: Editorial Sistema.
- —(1997). Ciencia, tecnología y sociedad (ed.). Madrid: Editorial Sistema.
- —(1997). Tendencias de futuro en la sociedad española (ed.). Madrid: Editorial Sistema.
- —(1997). Tendencias en estratificación y desigualdad social en España. Madrid: Editorial Sistema.
- —(1998). Tendencias en exclusión social en las sociedades tecnológicas. El caso español. Madrid: Editorial Sistema.
- —(1998). Tendencias de dualización y exclusión social en las sociedades avanzadas. Un marco para el análisis. Madrid: UNED.
- —(1998). Tecnología y sociedad en el nuevo siglo. Madrid: Editorial Sistema.
- —(1999). Tendencias en desigualdad y exclusión social (ed.). Madrid: Editorial Sistema.
- —(2000). Iniciación a la Sociología: La Sociedad. Madrid: UNED.
- — (2001). La sociedad dividida. Estructuras de clases y desigualdades en las sociedades tecnológicas. Madrid: Biblioteca Nueva.
- — (2001). El trabajo perdido: ¿hacia una civilización postlaboral?. Madrid: Biblioteca Nueva.
- — (2002). La Democracia Incompleta. El futuro de la democracia postliberal. Madrid: Biblioteca Nueva.
- —(2000). Escenarios del nuevo siglo. Madrid: Editorial Sistema.
- —(2002). Clase, estatus y poder en las sociedades emergentes (ed.). Madrid: Editorial Sistema.
- —(2002). Tendencias sociales de nuestra época. Los impactos de la revolución tecnológica (junto a Antonio García-Santesmases Martín-Tesorero). Madrid: UNED.
- —(2002). Estudio Delphi sobre tendencias económicas, políticas y sociales. Madrid: Editorial Sistema.
- —(2002). Estudio Delphi sobre tendencias científico-tecnológicas. Madrid: Editorial Sistema.
- —(2003). Tendencias en desvertebración social y política de solidaridad (ed.). Madrid: Editorial Sistema.
- —(2003). Alternativas para el siglo XXI. Madrid: Editorial Sistema.
- —(2004). Políticas económicas para el siglo XXI. Madrid: Editorial Sistema.
- —(2004). Tendencias en identidades, valores y creencias. Madrid: Editorial Sistema.
- —(2005). La paz y el derecho internacional. Madrid: Editorial Sistema.
- —(2005). Tendencias en exclusión social y políticas de solidaridad. Madrid: Editorial Sistema.
- —(2006). Las políticas de la Tierra. Madrid: Editorial Sistema.
- —(2007). Tendencias Sociales 1995-2006. Once años de cambios (junto a Verónica Díaz). Madrid: Editorial Sistema.
- —(2007). El rumbo de Europa. Madrid: Editorial Sistema.
- —(2007). Los impactos sociales de la evolución científico-tecnológica. Madrid: Editorial Sistema.
- —(2008). Tendencias de cambio de las identidades y valores de los jóvenes en España. 1995-2007 (junto a Juan José Villalón y Verónica Díaz). Madrid: INJUVE.
- —(2008). La inmigración y sus causas. Madrid: Editorial Sistema.
- —(2008). Condiciones laborales de los trabajadores inmigrantes en España. Madrid: Editorial Sistema.
- —(2008). España siglo XXI, Vol. I, La Sociedad (junto con Salustiano del Campo). Madrid: Biblioteca Nueva.
- —(2008). España siglo XXI, Vol. II, La Política (editor, junto con Salustiano del Campo). Madrid: Biblioteca Nueva.
- —(2008). Internet en las familias. Madrid: Editorial Sistema.
- —(2009). España siglo XXI. Vol. III, La Economía (editor, junto con Salustiano del Campo). Madrid: Biblioteca Nueva.
- —(2009). La calidad de la democracia. Madrid: Editorial Sistema.
- —(2009). Juventud y exclusión social. Madrid: Editorial Sistema.
- —(2009). España siglo XXI. Vol. IV, Ciencia y Tecnología (editor, junto con Salustiano del Campo). Madrid: Biblioteca Nueva.
- —(2009). España siglo XXI. Vol. V, Literatura y Bellas Artes (editor, junto con Salustiano del Campo). Madrid: Biblioteca Nueva.
- —(2010). El horizonte social y político de la juventud española (Junto a Juan José Villalón, Verónica Díaz y Vania Bravo). Madrid: Editorial Sistema.
- —(2010). La lucha contra el hambre y la pobreza (Junto con Alfonso Guerra y Sergio Tezanos). Madrid: Editorial Sistema.
- —(2010). España. Una sociedad en cambio (editor, junto con Salustiano del Campo). Madrid: Biblioteca Nueva.
- —(2010). Incertidumbres, retos y potencialidades del Siglo XXI: grandes tendencias internacionales. Madrid: Editorial Sistema.
- —(2011). Estudio Delphi sobre tendencias económicas, sociales y políticas (junto a Juan José Villalón y Ainoa Quiñones). Madrid: Editorial Sistema.
- —(2011). La rama quebrada. Madrid: Editorial Salto de Página.
- —(2012). Los retos de Europa: democracia y bienestar social. Madrid: Editorial Sistema.
- —(2012). Los nuevos problemas sociales. Madrid: Editorial Sistema.
- —(2012). Alternativas económicas y sociales frente a la crisis. Madrid: Editorial Sistema.
- —(2013). En los bordes de la pobreza. Las familias vulnerables en contextos de crisis (junto a Eva Sotomayor, Rosario Sánchez Morales y Verónica Díaz). Madrid: Biblioteca Nueva.
- —(2013). Spain: A changing society. Madrid: Biblioteca Nueva.
- —(2013). Juventud, cultura y educación. Madrid: Biblioteca Nueva.
- —(2016). Tendencias científico-tecnológicas: Retos, potencialidades y problemas sociales. Madrid: UNED-Fundación Sistema.
- —(2017). La cuestión juvenil. ¿Una generación sin futuro?. Madrid: Biblioteca Nueva.
- —(2017). Partidos políticos, democracia y cambio social. Madrid: Biblioteca Nueva.
- —(2021). Cambios sociales en tiempos de pandemia (ed.). Madrid: CIS.
- —(2022). Pedro Sánchez: Había partido: de las primarias a la Moncloa. Madrid: Los Libros de La Catarata.

== Bibliography ==
- Hernández de Frutos, Teodoro (2001). "José Félix Tezanos: La sociedad dividida. Estructura de clases y desigualdades en las sociedades tecnológicas, Biblioteca Nueva, Madrid, 2001, 397 págs". Revista de Estudios Políticos (111). Madrid: 321–324. ISSN 0048-7694.
- Tortosa, José María (2001). "Reseña de "La sociedad dividida. Estructuras de clases y desigualdades en las sociedades tecnológicas" (PDF). Reis. Revista Española de Investigaciones Sociológicas (94). Madrid: Centro de Investigaciones Sociológicas: 207–211. doi:10.2307/40184320. ISSN 0210-5233. JSTOR 40184320.
- Vázquez Martí, Laura (2003). "Sociedades tecnológicas, trabajo fragmentado y democracia: ¿un rompecabezas irresoluble?". Reis. Revista Española de Investigaciones Sociológicas (104). Madrid: Centro de Investigaciones Sociológicas: 255–266. ISSN 0210-5233.
