= Academic grading in New Zealand =

Various methods of academic grading in New Zealand are shown below.

== Secondary schools ==
=== NCEA ===
The National Certificate of Educational Achievement, the current national secondary school qualifications, uses standard-based assessment. Assessment for Achievement Standards uses a four-grade system, the lowest being a failing grade, while Unit Standards use a simple achieved/not achieved (pass/fail) grade system.

Official name	Common name	Abbreviation	Definition
Achievement with Excellence	Excellence	E	The candidate has demonstrated comprehensive understanding of the material tested
Achievement with Merit	Merit	M	The candidate has met the criteria of the standard which demonstrates in-depth understanding of the material tested
Achievement	Achieved	A	The candidate met the criteria of the standard to a level which demonstrates understanding of the material tested
Not Achieved	Not Achieved	N / NA	The candidate has not met the criteria required of the standard in order to pass
Standard Not Attempted	Not Attempted	SNA / V	The candidate has been entered for the standard but has not attempted/sat it

Several schools in New Zealand, predominantly in Auckland, also offer the CIE (Cambridge International Examinations) Program and IB (International Baccalaureate) in addition to NCEA.

Additional grades include

W = Withdrawn - Student was enrolled in the class/subject but withdrew before the examination or assessment could be awarded. N/A Aegrotat = When a student is off school from extreme circumstances (Life-threatening illness, coma, quarantine from an epidemic, extreme family situation (Refugeeism, force majeure, takeover or war in home country), an aegrotat pass may be awarded based on what the student may have earned as a grade, based on coursework so far and/or previous years results in each subject. This is an extreme situation and granted on a case-by-case basis.

P = Progressing - a Fail grade awarded to students through the year, when they are not achieving but are showing progress and are attempting the work, the goal is to get them to Achieved. It is not awarded as an official end of year grade and the student will either get a N or an A.

A+ = High Achievement - Another unofficial grade given in internal school assessments at some schools, this is to suggest a student who is working at a high level of achievement, but not high enough for Merit. Usually as the gulf between Achieved and Merit is so wide, some 50% of students get Achieved yet less than 25% get a Merit or Excellence.

=== School Certificate ===
Until 2002, School Certificate, the predecessor to NCEA Level 1, used a norm-based five-grade system.

Grade	Percentage
A	80% - 100%
B	65% - 79%
C	50% - 64%
D	30% - 49%
E	0% - 29%

== Universities ==
New Zealand universities generally award letter grades (i.e. A to D) to students, with +/- variations. These letter grades correspond to percentage mark bands, though these vary between universities (common cut-offs for A+ include 90% and 85%, and even within a university, an A+ from one department may vary from an A+ from another, with the actual cut-off subject to discretion). D grade is a failing grade, corresponding to work receiving less than 50%. However, for Honours degrees, the letter grades also correspond to degree classes, with A+/A/A- grades corresponding to a first, B+/high B corresponding to 2:1, etc.

Most universities in New Zealand mark C− as the minimum passing grade.

== See also ==
- Grading in education
- National Certificate of Educational Achievement
