= Journal of Intellectual & Developmental Disability =

- Discipline: Intellectual disability, Developmental disability
- Language: English
- Edited by: Professor Jennifer Clegg

Publication details
- Former names: Australia and New Zealand Journal of Developmental Disabilities
- History: 1975-present
- Publisher: Informa (United Kingdom)
- Frequency: Quarterly
- Impact factor: 1.347 (2010)

Standard abbreviations
- ISO 4: J. Intellect. Dev. Disabil.

Indexing
- CODEN: JIDDFG
- ISSN: 1366-8250 (print); 1469-9532 (web)
- LCCN: 96026805 sn 96026805
- OCLC no.: 34668243

Links
- Journal homepage; Online access

The Journal of Intellectual & Developmental Disability is a multidisciplinary journal in the field of intellectual and developmental disability and the official journal of the Australasian Society for Intellectual Disability. The editor in chief is Professor Jennifer Clegg (Honorary Associate Professor, University of Nottingham, UK; adjunct professor, La Trobe University, Australia).
