= Historia National Geographic =

Spanish history magazine

- Categories: History magazine
- Publisher: RBA Editores
- First issue: 2003
- Country: Spain
- Based in: Barcelona
- Language: Spanish
- Website: Historia National Geographic
- ISSN: 1696-7755
- OCLC: 436805114

Historia National Geographic is a Spanish language history magazine published in Barcelona, Spain. It is an offshoot of National Geographic magazine and was started in 2003. The publisher of the magazine is RBA Editores.

The magazine covers articles about the past civilizations and leading figures of the ancient world with the spectacular National Geographic photographs.

An Italian edition of Historia National Geographic entitled Storica National Geographic was launched by RBA Italia, a subsidiary of the RBA Editores, in February 2009.

In 2008 Historia National Geographic sold 160,000 copies.
