= International Federation of Social Workers =

The International Federation of Social Workers (IFSW) is the worldwide body for professional social work. It comprises 141 professional social work associations representing over 3 million social workers. IFSW has formal consultative status with the United Nations and other global bodies. The organisation’s purpose is to contribute to achieving a social just world through professional social work. IFSW and its partners set and review the international standards of social work, the Definition of Social Work and policies that promote good practice outcomes.

The current president of IFSW is Joachim Mumba who is a Social Worker in Zambia and a member of the Social Workers Association of Zambia.

== History ==
In 1958, IFSW with its partners published the journal International Social Work. A further point of development was in 1959 when IFSW was granted consultative status with the United Nations’ Economic and Social Council (ECOSOC).

IFSW policy role was expanded in 1960 after the Special Session at the 10th World Conference in Rome and in 1963 when IFSW asked to contribute to UN survey on international training for social workers. IFSW started to regionalise and the first region to be formed was Europe in 1965. This was followed by a Regional Conference for Asia in 1967.

In 1970, the South African member of IFSW was suspended due to its participation in the Apartheid regime. The 1980s saw the development of the global definition of social workers and IFSW was declared a "Peace Messenger" by the United Nations in 1985. In the 1990s, IFSW expanded its membership to over 80 member associations.

At the beginning of the 21st century, IFSW developed a training manual, Social Work and the Rights of the Child. In co-operation with the International Association of Schools of Social Work (IASSW), the global Definition of Social Work was adopted in 2001. In 2004, the co-operation continued with the joint publications of the Statement of Ethics in Social Work, Statement of Principles and the Global Standards for the Education and Training of the Social Work Profession. In 2005, IFSW consultative status was extended to UN Habitat. Additionally, IFSW has since achieved consultative status with the World Health Organization (WHO) and now comprises ninety member associations representing over 750,000 social workers.

In 2010, IFSW at a joint conference with the International Association of Schools of Social Work and the International Council on Social Welfare launched the Global Agenda for Social Work and Social Development. This tripartite agreement commits to working together to promote social justice, social development and sustainable systems of well-being. After two years of global consultation, the specific objectives of the agenda were published on UN Social Work Day 2012. Two reports have been published so far covering four years of data gathering on inequality and the dignity and respect of all people. These are available through the shop on the IFSW website. The third theme, is currently in progress looking at climate change, the wide context of environment and building sustainable communities. This report will be published in 2018. The final theme will highlight the importance of human relationships and will run from 2018-2020.

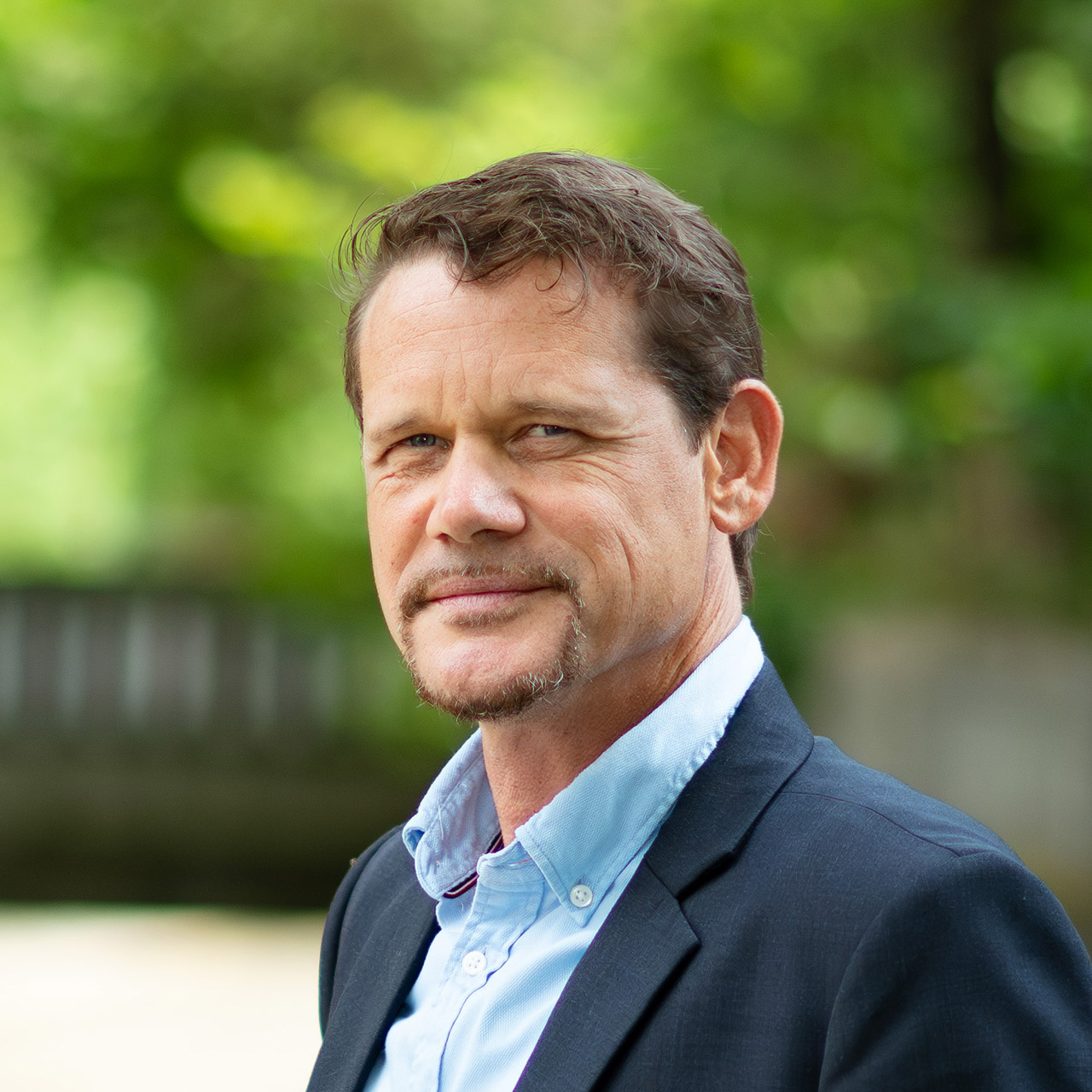
IFSW Interim Secretary-General Dr. Pascal Rudin

== IFSW organisational structure ==
Every two years at a General Meeting of members an international Executive Committee is democratically elected. This committee consists of a President, Treasurer and Regional President and Deputy Regional President. The six regions are Africa, Asia-Pacific, Europe, Latin America and the Caribbean and North America. In Zimbabwe, the federation is represented by the National Association of Social Workers of Zimbabwe (NASWZ).

A permanent Secretariat has been established since 1956 which is currently based in Rheinfelden, Switzerland. Dr. Pascal Rudin is the current Interim IFSW Secretary-General.

== See also ==
- Social work
- Professional Social Workers Association
