= Professional Social Workers' Association =

The Professional Social Workers' Association (PSWA) is an association of Indian / Tamil Nadu social work professionals, headquartered at Chennai. It is a legally registered entity, formerly known as "Professional Social Workers' Forum" (PSWF). The Association is functioning since 1985.

== Objectives ==
They are also organizing an annual state level seminar pertaining to current social work challenges and practices. International Social Workers' Day is an annual event of PSWA.
