= International Association of Schools of Social Work =

Association of schools of social work

The International Association of Schools of Social Work (IASSW) is a worldwide association of schools focused primarily on social work and social-work educators. The IASSW was founded in 1928.

== Structure and leadership ==
The organization is governed by the Board of Directors made up of both elected and appointed members. The IASSW has had 14 Presidents.

A list of IASSW Presidents:

- 1928/29-1946 Alice Salomon (Germany, then – USA)
- 1946–1953 René Sand (Belgium)
- 1954–1961 Jan Floris de Jongh (Netherlands)
- 1961–1968 Eileen Younghusband (United Kingdom)
- 1968–1976 Herman D. Stein (USA)
- 1976–1980 Robin Huws Jones (United Kingdom)
- 1980–1988 Heiner Schiller (Germany)
- 1988–1996 Ralph Garber (Canada)
- 1996–2004 Lena Dominelli (United Kingdom)
- 2004–2008 Abye Tasse (Ethiopia)
- 2008–2012 Angelina Yuen (Hong Kong)
- 2012–2016 Vimla Nadkarni (India)
- 2016 –2024 Annamaria Campanini (Italy)
- 2024– 2028 (present) Antoinette Lombard (South Africa)

IASSW implements its activities through a committee and task-force structure. Committees include: nomination and election, capacity building, human rights and social justice, communication and publication, sustainability, climate change, and disaster intervention. Task forces include the Global Agenda and the Global Standards for Education and Training.

== Activities ==
Major Activities of IASSW include:

IASSW Global Standards Task Force
Monthly Webinars
IASSW Monthly & Weekly newsletters
Capacity Building Workshops
Cross-sectoral learning
International Projects Grant Funding
Global Social Work Documents
IASSW with the International Federation of Social Workers, or IFSW, developed three Global Social Work Documents, available on the IASSW website which includes the Global definition of Social Work; Global Social Work Statement of Ethical Principles; Global Standards for Social Work Education and Training; Ethics in Social Work Statement of Principles. The Global Definition Of Social Work was approved by the IASSW General Assembly and IFSW General Meeting in July 2014.
Ethics In Social Work, Statement Of Principles - the IASSW version of the Global Social Work Statement of Ethical Principles - which was unanimously adopted at the General Assembly of IASSW on 5 July 2018 in Dublin, Ireland is available in various languages.
IASSW and IFSW approved in July 2020, the Global Standards for Social Work Education and Training.
IASSW with IFSW and the Institute for Clinical Social Work (ICSW), developed the Global Agenda 2010–2020 and are currently developing the Global Agenda 2020–2030. Annually IASSW in collaboration with ICSW and IFSW sponsors World Social Work Day at the United Nations. The theme for World Social Work Day is based on the pillars of the Global Agenda.
IASSW has prepared two statements for social work understanding of the IASSW international position on social work research (2017) and clinical social work (2023).

== See also ==
- Social work
- Category: Social work education
