= Media multiplexity theory =

Concept in social science

Media multiplexity theory is a communication theory that examines the relationship between the strength of interpersonal ties and the number of communication media used within those ties. Developed by Caroline Haythornthwaite from research in organizational and educational settings, the theory proposes that people with stronger ties tend to use more communication media with one another. The theory is noted for its simplicity. Critics, however, believe that the theory lacks predictability and explanation of data.

Communication scholars have since taken the theory and used it to further their communication research, such as to examine media use in romantic relationships. The theory has also been used to examine media use expectancy violations, and impacts to these changes, within extended families. The theory has more recently been used by psychology scholars to further examine how one's enjoyment of the communication medium in use will affect relational ties, and to examine predictability patterns of media use.

The theory is usually summarised in five propositions and has been applied to romantic relationships, extended families, adult siblings, friendship groups, and workplace and distance-learning settings. It has also been criticised for limited predictive power.

== History ==
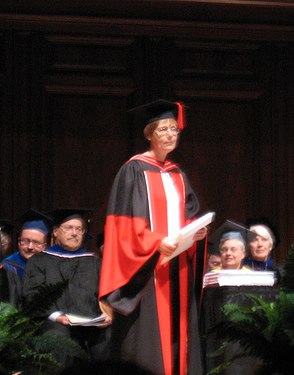
Caroline Haythornthwaite

Media multiplexity theory grew out of a series of social network studies of computer-mediated communication that Caroline Haythornthwaite and her collaborators conducted between the late 1990s and the mid 2000s.

In a 1998 study of a university research group, Haythornthwaite and Barry Wellman examined how work ties and friendship ties were associated with the media people used to exchange different kinds of information. They found that e-mail, unscheduled face-to-face encounters, and scheduled face-to-face meetings dominated the exchange of the six kinds of information they measured, while few pairs used synchronous desktop videoconferencing or the telephone.The researchers also found that people who talked more often used more ways to keep in touch. They also shared a wider range of information, making their relationship more “multiplex.”

In 2001, she studied a distance learning class where students talked online in several different ways. She followed their conversations to see who talked to whom, what they talked about, and which medium they used. Most of the conversations were between students working on the same project. Students used Webboard to post messages for the whole class and Internet Relay Chat for more general discussions with classmates. They only had one face to face contact, during a short on-campus session, appeared to have had a catalytic effect on emotional exchanges.

In a 2002 article, Haythornthwaite argued that the strength of the tie between two communicators helps reconcile otherwise conflicting findings about the impact of new media on social relations. Strongly tied pairs, she suggested, adapt and expand their media use to support exchanges that matter to their relationship, whereas weakly tied pairs depend on whatever means of communication are common and organizationally established. Introducing a new medium can therefore create latent ties, connections that exist technically but have not yet been activated, and can provide the infrastructure through which weak ties are activated.

The theory itself was named and formalised in Haythornthwaite's 2005 paper, "Social networks and Internet connectivity effects". Drawing on the earlier studies of academic research groups and distance learners, she reported that more strongly tied pairs used more media than weakly tied pairs, and that within a group, media use conformed to a unidimensional scale so that different tiers of media supported networks of different tie strengths. She termed this pattern media multiplexity and set out a series of propositions about how media use and tie strength are related.

== Origins of Media Multiplexity ==
In her 2005 paper, Haythornthwaite discussed studies of communication and media use among academic research groups and distance learners. These studies examined interpersonal relationships, communication content, and media choices together. In these settings, pairs with stronger ties tended to use more communication media than pairs with weaker ties. Haythornthwaite referred to this pattern as media multiplexity.

== Tie Strength ==
Tie strength, or the closeness of a relationship, is conventionally measured through the amount of time invested, reciprocity, intimacy, and emotional intensity. Media multiplexity theory takes this concept from social network analysis and asks how tie strength relates to the number of media a pair uses. The types of relationships that tend to demonstrate strong ties are the relationships that we have with friends who we are close with, prominent family members, and romantic partners. These strong tie relationships encourage more frequent information sharing and exchanging, have more self disclosure, and have a better chance of the two in the relationship sharing more similarities/qualities than differences. Weak ties are most commonly demonstrated through surface level friendships or acquaintances, and lack emotional intimacy intensity. These relationships tend to happen more casually, as they do not converse as often as strong ties, and are much less likely to show many similarities between the two in the relationship.

== Social Role ==
While the idea of Tie Strength is arguable the most important aspect to understanding media multiplexity, another factor that may play a crucial role in understanding the theory is evaluating ones social role within multimedia communication. For example, take maintaining the relationships we have with the important people (or strong ties) in our lives while we are at our place of work. This could be a spouse or significant other. Here, adults may use mobile media communication, such as phone calls or texting, to plan and coordinate every day activities with their significant other, such as figuring out who will pick up the children after work. Members who are a part of the same social institution, which could include a group of work colleagues or a group of family members, may be encouraged to utilize multiple different types of communication channels. This may be done to help keep and maintain the coordination amongst the activities within said group. For example, some groups may decide that it is best/ most useful for them to use asynchronous forms of media to communicate with one and other because it does not call for immediate attention. It does not disrupt the person receiving the call or message in the moment they receive it, and allows for them to respond when it is convenient. In other cases the opposite could be true. A voice call may be considered the most efficient way of communicating virtually, if such communication requires a person be readily available, or if it requires the discussion of complex information.

== Media Multiplexity in Groups ==
A limitation to looking at many past research studies regarding the Media Multiplexity Theory, is that most of the prior work mainly only focused on evaluating the media communication between relationships that are dyads, which most often included romantic relationships or relationships that involve two close friends. Triads, or any media group communication that involved three or more people, is very underrepresented in the amount of studies available. A contributing reason for this is that studying group media communication requires a lot more coordination. It is harder to understand each group members preferences and time schedules which makes it difficult. Because of this, the results of these studies may not be able to be generalized to other groups which hurts future research.

While this is the case, a study that was done by Caroline Lehmann and Sonja Utz, was able to find some strong media communication patters that were very commonly present amongst multiple groups. This was done by studying and looking at how different groups used different media communication channels. In their study, besides when it came to looking at groups that consisted of old people who just used email, it was noted that all other groups/ clusters that were studied heavily valued group chats. Through these group chats, most of the groups members in each group that was studied were said to have reported very similar levels of connectedness to the other group members. It can still be debated in how effective groups chats are in achieving group connectedness, however group chats do seem to play a crucial role in maintaining group friendships from a distance virtually.

== Types of media multiplexity ==
The media multiplexity theory contains three different types of multimedia communications, all of which are essential to the theory.

1. The first form is the number of media present within the tie/relationship. This shows the amount of different channels, such as social media apps, that are used between two partners in a specific relationship. Looking at this form specifically is how scholars have most commonly researched MMT in past studies. The other forms began to be explored more for MMT research, as it was understood that simply using a specific channel in a relationship does not mean that the channel is used often. Some relationships use certain media only on occasion.
2. Because of this, frequency is the second form of media multiplexity within a relationship. This is recording how often people in a relationship use a specific channel or media to relay messages back and forth.
3. The third form of media multiplexity within a relationship is variability. This refers to looking at how the communication between people in a specific relationship differs depending on which channel or media the people in that relationship are using. Different situations may promote partners to use certain channels for varying time durations and reasons.

=== Synchronous vs. Asynchronous ===
Some research contrasts the MMT, and claims that it is possible that the frequency and number of media present within a relationship is not the important part in determining the strength of a relationship. What matters is the use of specific media channels. This is demonstrated through varying delays in response (or synchronicity) between different channels of media. Media channels that enable interactions in the relationship to take place in real time are referred to as synchronous. This can include face time, phone calls, and multiplayer online video gaming. Media channels that do not require real time interactions, or an immediate response are asynchronous. This includes channels such as most social media apps like Instagram, email, text, etc. Each maintain how a relationship will communicate differently.

== Propositions of media multiplexity theory ==
This theory is composed of five propositions.

1. The first proposition is that media multiplexity and tie strength are positively associated with each other, where tie strength refers to the strength of the relational bond. Tie strengths can be broken down in to two categories, weak tie (not a lot of time invested into the relationship) and strong tie (large amount of time invested in the relationship).
2. The next proposition is that the content of communication will be different depending on the tie strength, rather than by the channels of communication used.
3. The next proposition is that media use and tie strength have a cause-relationship, meaning that over time they will cause the other.
4. The next proposition is that changes in the media layout will influence weak bond (or ties).
5. The last proposition is that groups hold a hierarchical order of expectational media use. This means that the group will come up with expectations of what communication mediums to use depending on the tie strengths.

While looking at these five propositions of media multiplexity theory, one should keep in mind that a common limitation of many of the studies regarding the MMT is that they often occur during short periods of time. It is important to remember that some relationships take a long time, and are built through communication channels slowly, forming over weeks and months. Others can be built much quicker, forming over minutes and even seconds. It is common and likely for tie strength and media use to have changes that occur slowly over time, this is especially true in relationships that we have already established.

Ledbetter tested the proposition that tie strength and media multiplexity mutually influence each other. The study used survey data collected in spring 2020 and spring 2021 to examine friendships during the first year of the COVID-19 pandemic. The longitudinal analysis suggested that tie strength predicted subsequent media multiplexity. In contrast, the analysis of retrospective reports on pre-pandemic relationships supported the claim that media multiplexity predicted tie strength. The author suggested that clearer boundary conditions and a better understanding of the mechanisms linking tie strength and media multiplexity were needed.

== See also ==
- Interpersonal ties
- Media richness theory
- Networked individualism
- Polymedia
- Social network analysis
- Social penetration theory
- Uses and gratifications theory
