= Friending and following =

Actions on social networking services

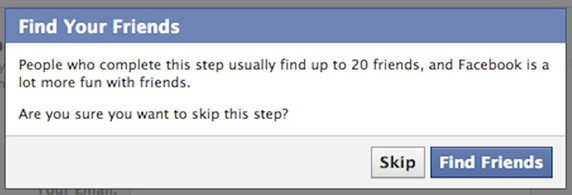
A "find your friends" alert box on Facebook, circa 2012

Friending is the act of adding someone to a list of "friends" on a social networking service. The notion does not necessarily involve the concept of friendship. (Note: The transitive use of the verb "friend" to mean "befriend" is listed as an archaism in the Oxford Dictionary of English.) It is also distinct from the idea of a "fan"—as employed on the WWW sites of businesses, bands, artists, and others—since it is more than a one-way relationship. A "fan" only receives things. A "friend" can communicate back to the person friending. The act of "friending" someone usually grants that person special privileges (on the service) with respect to oneself. On Facebook, for example, one's "friends" have the privilege of viewing and posting to one's "timeline".

Following is a similar concept on other social network services, such as Twitter and Instagram, where a person (follower) chooses to add content from a person or page to their newsfeed. Unlike friending, following is not necessarily mutual, and a person can unfollow (stop following) or block another user at any time without affecting that user's following status.

The first scholarly definition and examination of friending and defriending (the act of removing someone from one's friend list, also called unfriending) was David Fono and Kate Raynes-Goldie's "Hyperfriendship and beyond: Friends and Social Norms on LiveJournal" from 2005, which identified the use of the term as both a noun and a verb by users of early social network site and blogging platform LiveJournal, which was originally launched in 1999.

== Friend/follower count, friend collecting, and multiple accounts ==
The addition of people to a friend list without regard to whether one actually is their friend is sometimes known as friend whoring. Matt Jones of Dopplr went so far as to coin the expression "friending considered harmful" to describe the problem of focusing upon the friending of more and more people at the expense of actually making any use of a social network.

Friend collecting is the adding of hundreds or thousands of friends/followers, a not uncommon order of magnitude on some social sites. As a result, many teen users feel pressured to heavily curate their posts, posting only carefully posed and edited photographs with well-thought-out captions. Some Instagram users will create a second account, known as a Finsta (short for "Fake Instagram"). A Finsta is typically private, and the owner only allows close friends to follow it. Since the follower count is kept down, the posts can be more candid and silly in nature. Users may also create multiple accounts based on their interests. Someone with a personal social media account might be a photographer and maintain a separate account for that.

There is risk associated with following large numbers of people: scholars say that social anxiety could be an effect of managing a large social media network, as users can feel jealous and have a "fear of missing out".

== Unfriending and unfollowing ==
Unfriending is the act of removing someone from a friends list. On Facebook, this means the action is unilateral, meaning, the friendship is terminated on both sides. The act of unfriending is often used when one user was flirting and made the other uncomfortable.

Unfollowing is a little different. When a user unfollows someone on Instagram or Twitter, it continues a one-sided relationship. Often, the unfollowed user doesn't realize they were unfollowed, so they continue the following.

== Social network friending and friendship ==
There are distinct groups of "friends" that one can friend on a social networking service. The notion of a social network friend does not necessarily embody the concept of friendship. Although terminology has not yet evolved to distinguish the different types of social networking friends, they can be broken into the following three categories.

friends who are actually known
These are people that may be one's friends or family in real life, with whom one has regular interaction either on-line or off-line.
organizational friends
These are companies and other organizations who maintain a "friending" relationship as a contacts list.
complete strangers
These are social networking "friends" with whom one has no relationship at all.

Within these categories "friends" can be made up of strong ties, weak existing ties, weak latent ties, and parasocial ties. Strong ties can be made up of close family members and friends where self-disclosure, intimacy and frequent content occur. Weak existing ties can be made up of acquaintances, co-workers and distance relatives with whom the user has inconsistent contact. Weak latent ties can be made up of people within a similar geographical location or profession that can be used as a potential future bridge to other connections. Parasocial ties can be made up of celebrities, public figures and media personas.

Human nature is to reciprocate a friending, marking someone as a friend who has marked oneself as a friend. This is a social norm for social networking services. However, this leads to mixing up who is an actual friend, and who is a contact. Tagging someone as a "contact" who has marked one as a "friend" can be perceived as impolite. Other concerns about this issue are treated in Sherry Turkle's Alone Together which analyses many behavioral dynamics in social media friendships. Turkle defines herself as "cautiously optimistic", but expresses concern that distance communications may undermine genuine face-to-face spoken discourses, lessening people's expectations of one another.

One social networking service, FriendFeed, allows one to friend someone as a "fake" friend. The person "fake" friended receives the usual notifications for friending, but that person's updates are not received. Gavin Bell, author of Building Social Web Applications, describes this mechanism as "ludicrous".

Results from a 2007 survey the Center for the Digital Future stated that only 23% of internet users have at least one virtual friend whom they have only met online. Ideally the number of virtual friends is directly proportional to the use of the Internet, but the same survey showed 20% of heavy-users (more than 3 hours/day) who claimed an average of 8.7% online friends, reported at least one relationship that started virtually and migrated to in-person contact.

This results and other concerning issues are included in the book Networked: The New Social Operating System co-written by Lee Rainie and Barry Wellman in 2012.

== Ethical considerations ==
The act of "friending" someone on a social networking service has particular ethical implications for judges in the United States. Judicial codes of conducts in the various states generally incorporate some form of provision that judges should avoid even the appearance of impropriety. Whether this regulates and even prohibits judges "friending" attorneys that appear before them, and law enforcement personnel, has been the subject of some analysis by the judicial ethics panels of the various states. They haven't all agreed on the guidance that they have given to judges:

- The New York state Judicial Ethics committee in 2009 simply advised judges to employ caution, noting that the issue of "friending" someone on a social networking service is a publicly observable act that has little difference from other public behavior concerns judges already face.
- The Florida Judicial Ethics Advisory committee in 2009 noted that, judges being normal human beings, it was unavoidable for judges to form friendships without the responsibilities of their job. It prohibited judges from friending any attorneys that appeared before them, whilst allowing friending of those who do not, on the grounds that it may give the appearance to the general public (even if the substance is otherwise) that those attorneys who are friended hold special sway with the judge.

A minority opinion of the committee asserted that there is a substantive difference between "friending" on a social networking service and actual friendship, and that the general public, being aware of the norms of social networking services, was capable of drawing this distinction and would not reasonably conclude either a special degree of influence or a violation of the code of judicial conduct. This minority opinion was outnumbered twice in 2009, both in the Judicial Ethics Advisory and in the Florida Supreme Court Judicial Ethics Advisory committee.

- The South Carolina judicial conduct committee in 2009 permitted judges to friend attorneys and law enforcement personnel, with the proviso that no judicial business should be conducted upon nor discussed via the social networking service. "... a judge should not become isolated from the community in which the judge lives.", the committee stated.
- The Kentucky Judicial Ethics committee in 2010 took the same position as the minority opinion in Florida. It urged judges to exercise caution, but recognized that the act of friending "does not, in and of itself, indicate the degree or intensity of a judge's relationship with the person who is the 'friend'."
- The California Judges Association Judicial Ethics Committee and the Ohio Supreme Court's Board of Commissioners on Grievances and Discipline, both in 2010, reviewed the options of ethics committees that had gone before them, and concurred with what appears to be the majority view, that it is permissible for judges to friend attorneys that appear before them, although with the exercise of caution, and as long as the rules of conduct are observed within the social networking service just as they are observed without it.
