= Haythornthwaite =

Haythornthwaite is an English surname, meaning the meadow or clearing in the hawthorn trees. Notable people with this surname include the following:

- Ethel Haythornthwaite (1894–1986), British environmentalist and pioneer of the countryside movement
- Caroline Haythornthwaite, Canadian academic in information sciences
- Joan Haythorne (born Haythornthwaite), British actress
- Natalie Haythornthwaite, English netball player
- Philip Haythornthwaite (born 1951), English military historian
- Richard Haythornthwaite, British business executive

== See also ==
- Hawthornthwaite
