= Hyperconnectivity =

Social science term

Hyperconnectivity is a term invented by Canadian social scientists Anabel Quan-Haase and Barry Wellman, arising from their studies of person-to-person and person-to-machine communication in networked organizations and networked societies. The term refers to the use of multiple means of communication, such as email, instant messaging, telephone, face-to-face contact and Web 2.0 information services.

Hyperconnectivity is also a trend in computer networking in which all things that can or should communicate through the network will communicate through the network. This encompasses person-to-person, person-to-machine and machine-to-machine communication. The trend is fueling large increases in bandwidth demand and changes in communications because of the complexity, diversity and integration of new applications and devices using the network.

Communications equipment maker Nortel has recognized hyperconnectivity as a pervasive and growing market condition that is at the core of their business strategy. CEO Mike Zafirovski and other executives have been quoted extensively in the press referring to the hyperconnected era.

Apart from network-connected devices such as landline telephones, mobile phones and computers, newly-connectable devices range from mobile devices such as PDAs, MP3 players, GPS receivers and cameras through to an ever wider collection of machines including cars refrigerators and coffee makers, all equipped with embedded wireline or wireless networking capabilities. The IP enablement of all devices is a fundamental limitation of IP version 4, and IPv6 is the enabling technology to support massive address explosions.

There are other, independent, uses of the term:

- The U.S. Army describes hyperconnectivity as a digitization of the battlefield where all military elements are connected.
- Hyperconnectivity is used in medical terminology to explain billions and billions of neurons creating excessive connections, within the brain associated with schizophrenia, or epileptic seizures or DS

== Examples ==
Some examples to support the existence of this accelerating trend to hyperconnectivity include the following facts and assertions:

- About 2.8 billion mobile phones are already in use with another 1.6 million being added every day (The Economist, April 28, 2007)
- The network will need to accommodate a trillion devices, most of them wireless, in the next 15–20 years' time (David Clark, MIT)
- Sales of wireless modules for devices, sensors and machines are forecast to grow to $400 million by 2011 (Harbor Research)
- Tens of billions of e-mails, mobile text messages and instant messages are being sent through the world's public networks each day (The Economist, April 28, 2007)
