= Anabel Quan-Haase =

Canadian academic and published author

Anabel Quan-Haase (born 1970s) is a Canadian academic and published author. She is currently a full professor at the University of Western Ontario located in London, Ontario, where she is jointly appointed to the Faculty of Information and Media Studies and the Department of Sociology. Quan-Haase is past-president and past social media director of the Canadian Association for Information Science (CAIS). She is the 2019-2020 chair of CITAMS (the Communication, Information, Technology and Media Sociology) section of the American Sociological Association.

== Education ==
Anabel Quan-Haase received an undergraduate degree in psychology from Humboldt University in Berlin. In 1998, she earned a Master's of Science in psychology, also from Humboldt University. In 2004, Quan-Haase obtained a PhD in Information Studies from the University of Toronto while working under the supervision of Lynne Howarth and an advisory committee including Barry Wellman, Chun Wei Choo, and Derrick de Kerckhove.

== Research ==
Quan-Haase's Ph.D. work examined the flow of information in high-tech organizations and compared employees' face-to-face, email, and instant messaging networks. Additionally, she was involved in a large-scale survey which investigated the effect of the internet on people's social relations, their sense of community, and their political involvement. Through her research with Barry Wellman, the concepts of "hyperconnectivity", "local virtuality" and "virtual locality" were established. Quan-Haase's current research and teaching is focused on technology and its effects on society, as well as computer-mediated communication. In her work with Barry Wellman, Renwen Alice Zhang, and Molly-Gloria Harper, they have identified variations in how older adults (65+) use the internet to stay connected and gain information. Most recently, she with Wellman and Harper have distinguished a typology of networked individualism as either Networked, Bounded, or Limited. Presently (2014), Quan-Haase has given more than 60 talks at national and international conferences based on her research.

=== Sociodigital Lab ===
Quan-Haase is the director of the Sociodigital Lab at the University of Western Ontario. The Sociodigital lab is a research lab which explores a wide range of topics linked to how information and communication technologies lead to social change. Some of the projects under Quan-Haase's direction include examining ending relationships in an era of digital communication (which is termed "breakup 2.0"), serendipity in everyday chance encounters, the impact of e-books and electronic scholarly communications, and the media's role in disaster early-warning systems in Brazil.

=== Books ===
Anabel Quan-Haase has published numerous articles and book chapters on the topics of social networking, information technology, instant messaging, older adults, and internet use. Additionally, she is the author of the 2009 book Information Brokering in the High-Tech Industry: Online Social Networks at Work published by Lambert Academic Publishing and Technology and Society: Inequality, Power, and Social Networks published by Oxford University Press in 2012. More recent books include Quan-Haase, Anabel, & Tepperman, Lorne (2018). Real-Life Sociology. Don Mills, ON: Oxford University Press and Quan-Haase, Anabel. (2020). Technology and Society. Don Mills, ON: Oxford University Press.
