= Barry Wellman =

American sociologist (1942–2024)

Barry Wellman FRSC
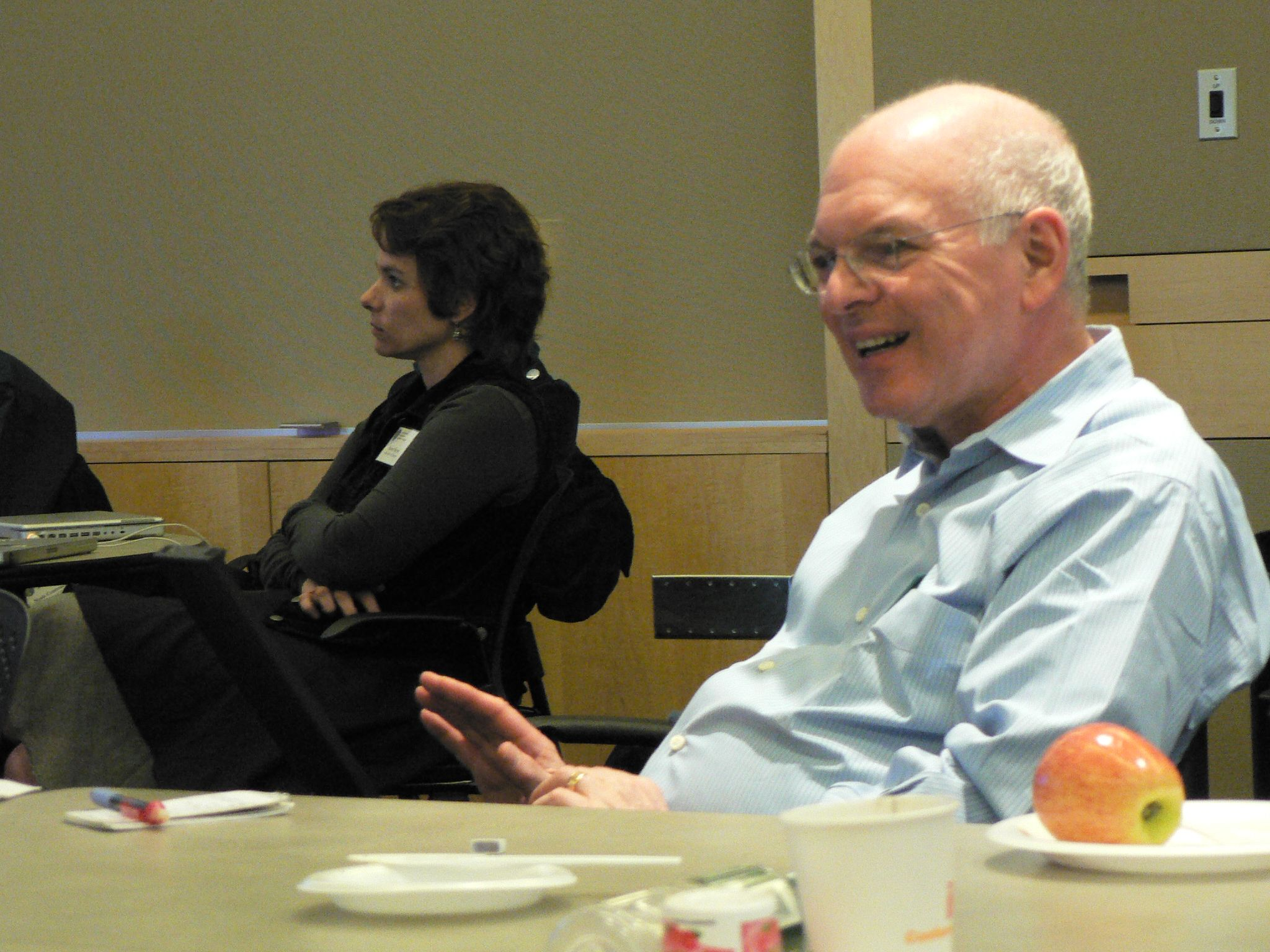
- Born: 30 September 1942; The Bronx, New York, U.S.
- Died: 9 July 2024 (aged 81); Toronto, Ontario, Canada
- Citizenship: Canadian, American
- Education: Lafayette College, Harvard University
- Scientific career
- Fields: Sociological Theory, Social Network Analysis, Community, Technology and Society
- Workplaces: University of Toronto
- Doctoral advisor: Dudley C. Gordon, Charles Tilly, Harrison White
- Doctoral students: Keith Hampton, Caroline Haythornthwaite, Anabel Quan-Haase

Barry Wellman FRSC (30 September 1942 – 9 July 2024) was an American-Canadian sociologist and was the co-director of the Toronto-based international NetLab Network. His areas of research were community sociology, the Internet, human–computer interaction and social structure, as manifested in social networks in communities and organizations. His overarching interest was in the paradigm shift from group-centered relations to networked individualism. He wrote and co-authored more than 300 articles, chapters, reports and books. Wellman was a professor at the Department of Sociology, University of Toronto, for 46 years, from 1967 to 2013, including a five-year stint as the S. D. Clark Professor.

Among the theories Wellman helped develop were: "network of networks" and "the network city" (both with Paul Craven), "the community question", "computer networks as social networks", "connected lives" and the "immanent Internet" (both with Bernie Hogan), "media-multiplexity" (with Caroline Haythornthwaite), "networked individualism" and "networked society", "personal community" and "personal network" and three with Anabel Quan-Haase: "hyperconnectivity", "local virtuality" and "virtual locality".

Lee Rainie and Barry Wellman were co-authors of the 2012 prize-winning Networked: The New Social Operating System (MIT Press). Wellman was also the editor of three books and more than 500 articles, often co-written with students.

Wellman received career achievement awards from the Canadian Sociology and Anthropology Association, the International Network for Social Network Analysis, the International Communication Association, the GRAND Network of Centres of Excellence, and two sections of the American Sociological Association: Community and Urban Sociology; Communication and Information Technologies. He was elected as a Fellow of the Royal Society of Canada (FRSC) in 2007. In 2012, Wellman was identified as having the highest h-index (of citations) of all Canadian sociologists. He was a faculty member at the Department of Sociology at the University of Toronto for 46 years, from 1967 to 2013. Since July 2013, he co-directed the NetLab Network. Wellman was honoured with the Lim Chong Yah Visiting Professorship of Communications and New Media at the National University of Singapore in January–February 2015.

After a long illness, Wellman died at the age of 81 on 9 July 2024.

== Early life ==
Barry Wellman was born and raised in the Grand Concourse and Fordham Road area of the Bronx, New York City. He attended P.S. 33 and Creston J.H.S. 79, and was a teenage member of the Fordham Flames. He gained his high school degree from the Bronx High School of Science in 1959. He received his A.B. (Bachelor's) degree magna cum laude from Lafayette College in 1963, majoring in social history and winning prizes in both history and religious studies. At Lafayette, he was a member of the McKelvy Honors House and captained the undefeated 1962 College Bowl team, whose final victory was over Berkeley.

His graduate work was at Harvard University, where he trained with Chad Gordon, Charles Tilly and Harrison White, and also studied with Roger Brown, Cora Du Bois, George Homans, Alex Inkeles, Florence Kluckhohn, Talcott Parsons and Phillip J. Stone. He received a M.A. in Social Relations in 1965 and a Ph.D. in Sociology in 1969. His focus was on community, computer applications, social networks and self-conception, and his dissertation showed that the social identities of African-American and White American Pittsburgh junior high school students were related to the extent of segregation of their schools.

From 1965 until his death, he was married to Beverly Wellman, a researcher in complementary and alternative medicine.

== Career ==
=== Community sociology ===
Until 1990, he focused on community sociology and social network analysis. During his first three years in Toronto, he also held a joint appointment with the Clarke Institute of Psychiatry where he working with D. B. Coates, M.D., co-directing the "Yorklea Study" in the Toronto borough of East York. This first East York study, with data collected in 1968, did a field study of a large population, linking interpersonal relations with psychiatric symptoms. This early study of "social support" documented the prevalence of non-local friendship and kinship ties, demonstrating that community is no longer confined to neighborhood and studying non-local communities as social networks. Wellman's "The Community Question" paper, reporting on this study, has been selected as one of the seven most important articles in English-Canadian sociology.

A second East York study, conducted in 1978 and 1979 at the University of Toronto's Centre for Urban and Community Studies, used in-depth interviews with 33 East Yorkers (originally surveyed in the first study) to learn more information about their social networks. It provided evidence about which kinds of ties and networks supply which types of social support. It showed, for example, that sisters provide siblings with much emotional support, while parents provide financial aid. The support comes more from the characteristics of the ties than from the networks in which they are embedded. This research also demonstrated that wives maintain social networks for their husbands as well as for themselves.

Although Wellman's work has shifted primarily to studies of the Internet (see section below), he has continued collaborative analyses of the first and second East York studies, showing that reciprocity (like social support) is much more of a tie phenomenon than a social network phenomenon and that the frequency and supportiveness of interpersonal contact before the Internet was non-linearly associated with residential (and workplace) distance.

Wellman has edited Networks in the Global Village (1999), a book of original articles about personal networks around the world. In 2007, he edited a special issue, "The Network is Personal" of the journal Social Networks (vol. 29, no. 3, July), containing analyses from Canada, France, Germany and Iran.

=== Social network theory ===
Concomitant with his empirical work, Wellman contributed to the theory of social network analysis. The most comprehensive statement is in his introductory article to Social Structures, co-edited with the late S. D. Berkowitz. This work reviews the history of social network thought, and suggests a number of basic principles of social network analysis.

More recent and more focused theoretical work has discussed the "glocalization" of contemporary communities (simultaneously "global" and "local") and the rise of "networked individualism" – the transformation from group-based networks to individualized networks. American Sociological Association career achievement award winner Harrison White notes: "Barry Wellman stands out as having devoted an entire career to exploring and documenting natural social worlds in network terms."

=== Social network methods ===
Wellman's methodological contributions have been for the analysis of ego-centered or "personal" networks – defined from the standpoint of an individual (usually a person). As batches of personal networks are often studied, this calls for somewhat different techniques than the more common social network practice of analyzing a single large network.

A 2007 paper, co-authored by Wellman (with Bernie Hogan and Juan-Antonio Carrasco), has discussed alternatives in gathering personal network data. A paper with Kenneth Frank showed how to tackle the problem of simultaneously analyzing personal network data on the two distinct levels of ties and networks. "Neighboring in Netville" has been cited as the only published study of personal networks from a known roster of potential network members.

=== Internet, technology and society ===
Wellman often worked in collaboration with computer scientists, communication scientists and information scientists. In 1990, he became involved in studying how ordinary people use the Internet and other communication technologies to communicate and exchange information at work, at home and in the community. Thus his work has expanded his interest in non-local communities and social networks to encompass the Internet, mobile phones and other information and communication technologies.

==== Work networks and ICTs ====
Wellman's initial project ("Cavecat" which morphed into "Telepresence") was in collaboration with Ronald Baecker, Caroline Haythornthwaite, Marilyn Mantei, Gale Moore, and Janet Salaff. This effort in the early 1990s was done before the widespread popularity of the Internet, to use networked PCs for videoconferencing and computer supported collaborative work (CSCW). Caroline Haythornthwaite (for her dissertation and other works) and Wellman analyzed why computer scientists connect with each other – online and offline. They discovered that friendships as well as collaborative work were prime movers of connectivity at work.

Wellman and Anabel Quan-Haase also studied whether such computer-supported work teams were supporting networked organizations, in which bureaucratic structure and physical proximity did not matter. Their research in one high-tech American organization – heavily dependent on instant messaging and e-mail – showed that the supposed ICT-driven transformation of work to networked organizations was only partially fulfilled in practice. The organizational constraints of departmental organization (including power) and physical proximity continued to play important roles. There were strong norms in the organization for when different communication media were used, with face-to-face contact intertwined with online contact.

==== Community networks and ICTs ====
As a community sociologist, Wellman began arguing that too much analysis of life online was happening in isolation from other aspects of everyday life. He published several papers (alone and with associates) arguing the need to contextualize Internet research, and proposing that online relations – like off-line – would be best studied as ramified social networks rather than as bounded groups. This argument culminated in a 2002 book, The Internet in Everyday Life (co-edited with Caroline Haythornthwaite), providing exemplification from studies in a number of social milieus.

Wellman did empirical work in this area: he was part of a team (led by James Witte) that surveyed visitors to the National Geographic Society's website in 1998 and used these data to counter the dystopian argument that Internet involvement was associated with social isolation.

The large U.S. national random-sample survey analyzed in the Pew Internet report, "The Strength of Internet Ties" (with Jeffrey Boase, John B. Horrigan and Lee Rainie) also showed a positive association between communication online and communication by telephone and face-to-face. The study showed that email is well-suited for maintaining regular contact with large networks, and especially with relationships that are only somewhat strong. The study also found that Internet users get more help than non-users from friends and relatives.

Research into the "glocalization" concept also fed into this intellectual stream. Keith Hampton and Wellman studied the Toronto suburb of "Netville", a pseudonym. It showed the interplay between online and offline activity, and how the Internet – aided by a list-serve – is not just a means of long-distance communication but enhances neighboring and civic involvement.

He collaborated with Helen Hua Wang and Jeffrey Cole of the World Internet Project's Center for the Digital Future to investigate the first national U.S. survey of social relationships and Internet use. Their work shows that the number of friends are growing, and that heavy Internet users have more friends than others. Wellman also collaborated with Ben Veenhof (Statistics Canada), Carsten Quell (Department of Canadian Heritage) and Bernie Hogan to relate time spent at home on the Internet to social relations and civic involvement. A different focus is his collaboration on Wenhong Chen's study of transnational immigrant entrepreneurs who link China and North America.

Wellman's work continued to focus on the interplay between information and communication technologies, especially the Internet, social relations and social structure. He directed the Connected Lives study of the interplay between communication, community and domestic relationships in Toronto and in Chapleau in rural northern Ontario. Early findings of the interplay between online and offline life are summarized in "Connected Lives: The Project". More focused research (with Jennifer Kayahara) has shown how the onetime two-step flow of communication has become more recursively multi-step as the result of the Internet's facilitation of information seeking and communication. Research (with Tracy Kennedy) has argued that many households, like communities, have changed from local groups to become spatially dispersed networks connected by frequent ICT and mobile phone communication. Other NetLab researchers have included Julie Amoroso, Christian Beermann, Dean Behrens, Vincent Chua, Jessica Collins, Dimitrina Dimitrova, Zack Hayat, Chang Lin, Julia Madej, Maria Majerski, Mo Guang Ying, Diana Mok, Barbara Barbosa Neves, and Lilia Smale.

Wellman was involved in the "Networked Individuals" project, using the fourth East York study to investigate their social networks and digital media use. His collaborators included Brent Berry, Molly-Gloria Harper, Maria Kiceveski, Guang Ying Mo, Anabel Quan-Haase, Helen Hua Wang, and Alice Renwen Zhang. The initial papers focused on older adults, aged 65+. showing how they used digital media to stay connected with relatives and friends both near and far. Most recently, he with Anabel Quan-Haase and Molly-Gloria Harper have distinguished a typology of networked individualism as either Networked, Bounded, or Limited.

== Offices ==
- Founded the International Network for Social Network Analysis in 1976–1977 and led it until 1988. Concomitantly, founded, edited and published INSNA's informal journal, Connections.
- Founded and led the University of Toronto's "Structural Analysis Programme" in the Department of Sociology, 1979–1982, which focused on studying social structure and relationships from a social network perspective. The Department of Sociology subsequently established the "Barry Wellman Award" for excellence in undergraduate research.
- Associate Director of the Centre for Urban and Community Studies, University of Toronto (1980–1984), where his research was based, 1970–2007.
- Council member and then President of two sections of the American Sociological Association:
  - Community and Urban Sociology (1998-2000): led the team that founded the journal, City and Community;
  - Communications and Information Technologies (2005-2006): membership increased from 95 to 303.
- Elected to the council (2000) and then became President of the Sociological Research Association honor society (2004–2005).
- North American editor of Information, Communication and Society (2003-2017).

== Awards and recognition ==
Wellman was a Fellow of the Royal Society of Canada. He has received Career Achievement Awards from two sections of the American Sociological Association: Community & Urban Sociology and Communication and Information Technology. In 2008, he was the first person given the "Communication Research as an Open Field" Award, 2008, from the International Communication Association for a researcher who has "made important contributions to the field of communications from outside the discipline of communications." In 2014, he received a "Lifetime Achievement" award from the Oxford Internet Institute "in recognition of his extraordinary record of scholarship in social network theory and Internet research which has contributed so much to our understanding of life online."
