= Mobile privatization =

Mobile privatization can be described as an individual's attachment to a mobile device. This leads to a feeling of being "at home" while connected to a device in a mobile setting. Using a mobile device, an individual can feel as though they could travel anywhere in the world while still feeling comfortable because of the connectivity of their mobile device. The connection creates a sense of familiarity, resulting in the individual's identity becoming attached to their mobile service provider. This concept leads to the idea that "home" does not need to be a domestic structure featuring walls and a roof, but that the mobile sense of connection provides a portable community similar to a home environment.

== History of the concept ==
The term was first used by Raymond Williams in his 1974 book Television: Technology and Cultural Form. Williams described the main contradiction in modern society as the one between mobility and home-centered living. He considered that television can negotiate that contradiction by providing users privacy to view the world.

Paul du Gay, of the Copenhagen Business School, developed this theory in 2001. His main perspective was that home, for Williams, is a shrunken social space where isolated individuals gain vicariously increased mobility. Accordingly, he introduced the concept of “mobile privatised social relations”. Henrikson applied the concept of Technological Determinism to conclude that “Technologies can be designed, consciously or unconsciously, to open certain social options and close others”.

In 2005, Kenichi Fujimoto, Professor of Informatics and Mediology at Mukogawa Women's University, came up with a theory called "Nagara Mobilism". Nagara means people have the ability to handle different process like text, video and sound at the same time. He reaffirmed the contradiction between the physical and virtual home, and explained that increased privacy of public space can make the contradiction stronger. In 2007, the term glocalization was introduced. It means that when individuals utilize mobile technology, their social networks expand while making themselves much closer to the local community.

Hans Geser, a professor at the University of Zürich, has isolated four main features of mobile technology that weaken societal development:

- By increasing the pervasiveness of primary, particularistic social bonds.
- By reducing the need for time based scheduling and coordination.
- By undermining institutional controls and replacing location-based communication systems with person-based.
- By providing support for anachronistic “pervasive roles”.

== Sources ==
- Raymond Williams (2003) [1974], Television: technology and cultural form, Routledge
