= Hawthornthwaite =

Hawthornthwaite may refer to:

- Hawthornthwaite Fell, an English hill of the Forest of Bowland
- James Hurst Hawthornthwaite (1869-1926), Canadian politician

== See also ==
- Haythornthwaite
