= Keith Hampton =

American sociologist (1973–present)

Keith N. Hampton (born 1973) is professor of media and information at Michigan State University. His research interests focus on the relationship between information and communication technology, such as the Internet, social networks, and community democratic engagement, social isolation, and participation in the urban environment.

Hampton received his PhD from the Department of Sociology, University of Toronto, and has been a faculty member at MIT, the Annenberg School for Communication at the University of Pennsylvania and Rutgers University.

Recent research explores such subjects as social interaction in public spaces, the role of technology in social isolation, and the role of the Internet in neighborhood interactions and relationships.

== Career ==
Hampton received his B.A. (Bachelor's) in sociology, with honours, from the University of Calgary. He completed his graduate work at the University of Toronto, where he trained with Barry Wellman. He received an M.A. in sociology in 1998, and a Ph.D. in sociology in 2001. His dissertation, "Living the wired life in the wired suburb: Netville, glocalization and civil society", was an ethnography of a neighborhood in the suburbs of Toronto that had been equipped with high-speed Internet access.

After receiving his doctorate, Hampton joined the Massachusetts Institute of Technology faculty as the first professor of "technology and the city" in the Department of Urban Studies and Planning. He taught at MIT from 2001-2005. From 2003-2004, he was a fellow at the Saguaro Seminar and the Taubman Center for State and Local Government at the Kennedy School of Government, Harvard University. He left MIT in 2005 to join the Annenberg School for Communication at the University of Pennsylvania faculty as an assistant professor of communication. In 2012 he left the University of Pennsylvania to join Rutgers University, where he was an associate professor in the School of Communication and Information and a member of the graduate faculty in the Department of Sociology. In 2015 Hampton was named the endowed professor in communication and public policy and in 2016 was promoted to full professor. In August 2016, he joined Michigan State University as professor of media and information. In 2018 he became Director of Academic Research at the Quello Center for Telecommunication Management and Law.

Through empirical approaches, including observations of public spaces, and large-scale national surveys, Hampton has continued to explore the social consequences of new technologies. He created the website "i-Neighbors.org", which helped users to form virtual communities that correspond to physical neighborhoods. The site informed research on how Internet use affords local interactions, facilitates community involvement, and contributes to social capital. He is credited with popularizing the term glocalization as it pertains to understanding how new media encourage both global and local interactions. His work is regular featured in the media.

Hampton played a leading role in transforming the focus of the American Sociological Association's section on "Microcomputing" to its broader formation as the section on Communication and Information Technologies (CITASA). He served as chair of the American Sociological Association's section on Communication and Information Technologies from 2007-2009, and past-chair from 2009-2010.

== Honors and awards ==
Hampton has received numerous awards for his research. His dissertation received the top dissertation award from both the International Communication Association's Communication and Technology division, and the Media Ecology Association. In 2007 Hampton received an award for Public Sociology from CITASA for his work on i-Neighbors.org. In 2011 he received the Walter Benjamin Award from the Media Ecology Association for his paper "Internet Use and the Concentration of Disadvantage: Glocalization and the Urban Underclass". In 2011 he was given an award from CITASA for the top paper published in the prior two years for "The Social Life of Wireless Urban Spaces". In 2012 he received the Outstanding Article Award from the International Communication Association for the top article published during the previous two years for "Core Networks, Social Isolation, and New Media: Internet and Mobile Phone Use, Network Size, and Diversity".

In 2015 he received an award from CITAMS for the top paper published in the prior two years for “Change in the Social Life of Urban Public Spaces". In 2017 he was elected a member of the Sociological Research Association. In 2022 Hampton received the Career Achievement Award from CITAMS. In 2022 he received the Best paper award from the International Conference on Social Media & Society for “Excessive Social Media Use is Less Harmful than Disconnection for the Self Esteem of Rural Adolescents”. In 2022 Michigan State University awarded him the Distinguished Partnership Award for Community-Engaged Service for his work on “Critical Connections: Broadband Access, Student Learning Outcomes, and Community Development”.

== Notable publications ==
Hampton is the author of more than 50 peer-reviewed articles and book chapters. He has also authored a number of reports from the Pew Internet and American Life project.

- Hales, Gabriel, and Keith Hampton (2025). Rethinking Screen Time and Academic Achievement: Gender Differences and the Hidden Benefit of Online Leisure Through Digital Skills. Information, Communication & Society 29(2), 379-397. https://doi.org/10.1080/1369118X.2025.2516542
- Hampton, Keith and Kelley Cotter (2025). Disrupting Echo Chambers? How Social Media is Related to Social Tolerance Through Network Diversity: Linked Lives Over a Major Life Course Event. Information, Communication & Society 28(1), 150-168. https://doi.org/10.1080/1369118X.2025.2460556
- Hampton, Keith N., and Inyoung Shin (2023). Disconnection More Problematic for Adolescent Self-Esteem than Heavy Social Media Use: Evidence from Access Inequalities and Restrictive Media Parenting in Rural America. Social Science Computer Review 41(2), 626-647. https://doi.org/10.1177/08944393221117466
- Shin, Inyoung and Keith Hampton (2023). New Media Use and the Belief in a Just World: Awareness of Life Events and the Perception of Fairness for Self and Injustice for Others. Information, Communication & Society 26(2), 388-404. https://doi.org/10.1080/1369118X.2021.1950804
- Hampton, Keith and Barry Wellman. (2021). All the Lonely People? The Continuing Lament about the Loss of Community. In Leah Lievrouw and Brian Loader (Eds.), Routledge Handbook of Digital Media and Communication. Abingdon, UK. Routledge. 281-296.
- Hampton, Keith (2019). Social Media and Change in Psychological Distress over Time: The Role of Social Causation. Journal of Computer-Mediated Communication 24(5), 205-222. https://doi.org/10.1093/jcmc/zmz010
- Hampton, Keith and Barry Wellman. 2018. “Lost and Saved… Again: The Moral Panic about the Loss of Community Takes Hold of Social Media.” Contemporary Sociology 47, 6 (November): 643–651. https://doi.org/10.1177/0094306118805415
- Hampton, Keith, Inyoung Shin, and Weixu Lu. (2017). Social Media and Political Discussion: When Online Presence Silences Offline Conversation. Information, Communication & Society 20(7), 1090-1107. https://doi.org/10.1080/1369118X.2016.1218526
- Hampton, Keith. (2016). "Persistent and Pervasive Community: New Communication Technologies and the Future of Community." American Behavioral Scientist, 60(1), 101–124. https://doi.org/10.1177/0002764215601714
- Hampton, Keith, Lauren Sessions Goulet, & Garrett Albanesius (2014). "Change in the Social Life of Urban Public Spaces: The Rise of Mobile Phones and Women, and the Decline of Aloneness Over Thirty Years." Urban Studies.
- Hampton, Keith, Chul-joo Lee, & Eun Ja Her (2011). How New Media Affords Network Diversity: Direct and Mediated Access to Social Capital through Participation in Local Social Settings. New Media & Society 13(7), 1031-1049. https://doi.org/10.1177/1461444810390342
- Hampton, Keith, Lauren Sessions, & Eun Ja Her (2011). "Core Networks, Social Isolation, and New Media: Internet and Mobile Phone Use, Network Size, and Diversity." Information, Communication & Society 14(1), 130–155. https://doi.org/10.1080/1369118X.2010.513417
- Hampton, Keith, Lauren Sessions Goulet, Lee Rainie, and Kristen Purcell (2011). "Social Networking Sites and Our Lives: How People's Trust, Personal Relationships, and Civic and Political Involvement are Connected to Their Use of Social Networking Sites and Other Technologies." Pew Research Center. Washington, DC.
- Hampton, Keith, Oren Livio, and Lauren Sessions Goulet (2010). "The Social Life of Wireless Urban Spaces: Internet Use, Social Networks, and the Public Realm." Journal of Communication 4(60), 701–722. https://doi.org/10.1111/j.1460-2466.2010.01510.x
- Hampton, Keith (2010). "Internet Use and the Concentration of Disadvantage: Glocalization and the Urban Underclass." American Behavioral Scientist 53(8), 1111–1132. https://doi.org/10.1177/0002764209356244
- Hampton, Keith, Lauren Sessions, Eun Ja Her, and Lee Rainie (2009). "Social Isolation and New Technology: How the Internet and Mobile Phones Impact Americans' Social Networks." Pew Internet & American Life Project. Washington, DC.
- Hampton, Keith (2007). "Neighborhoods in the Network Society: The e-Neighbors Study." Information, Communication & Society. 10(5). 714–748. https://doi.org/10.1080/13691180701658061
- Hampton, Keith & Barry Wellman (2003). "Neighboring in Netville: How the Internet Supports Community and Social Capital in a Wired Suburb." City and Community 2(4), 277–311. https://doi.org/10.1046/j.1535-6841.2003.00057.x
