= Glocalization =

Portmanteau of globalization and localism

Glocalization or glocalisation (a portmanteau of globalization and localism) is the "simultaneous occurrence of both universalizing and particularizing tendencies in contemporary social, political, and economic systems". The concept "represents a challenge to simplistic conceptions of globalization processes as linear expansions of territorial scales. Glocalization indicates that the growing importance of continental and global levels is occurring together with the increasing salience of local and regional levels."

The adjective glocal means "reflecting or characterized by both local and global considerations". The term "glocal management" in a sense of "think globally, act locally" is used in the business strategies of companies, in particular by Japanese companies that are expanding overseas.

== Variety of uses ==
- Individuals, households and organizations maintaining interpersonal social networks that combine extensive local and long-distance interactions.
- The declaration of a specified locality – a town, city, or state – as world territory, with responsibilities and rights on a world scale: a process that started in France in 1950 and originally called mundialization.

== History of the concept ==
The concept comes from the Japanese word dochakuka, which means global localization. It had referred to the adaptation of farming techniques to local conditions. It became a buzzword when Japanese business adopted it in the 1980s. The word stems from Manfred Lange, head of the German National Global Change Secretariat, who used "glocal" in reference to Heiner Benking's exhibit Blackbox Nature: Rubik's Cube of Ecology at an international science and policy conference.

"Glocalization" first appeared in a late 1980s publication of the Harvard Business Review. At a 1997 conference on "Globalization and Indigenous Culture", sociologist Roland Robertson stated that glocalization "means the simultaneity – the co-presence – of both universalizing and particularizing tendencies".

The term entered use in the English-speaking world via Robertson in the 1990s, Canadian sociologists Keith Hampton and Barry Wellman in the late 1990s and Zygmunt Bauman. Erik Swyngedouw was another early adopter.

Since the 1990s, glocalization has been productively theorized by several sociologists and other social scientists, and may be understood as a process that combines the concerns of localism with the forces of globalization, or a local adaptation and interpretation of global forces. As a theoretical framework, it is compatible with many of the concerns of postcolonial theory, and its impact is particularly recognizable in the digitization of music and other forms of cultural heritage. The concept has since been used in the fields of geography, sociology, and anthropology. It is also a prominent concept in business studies, particularly in the area of marketing goods and services to a heterogenous set of consumers.

== Sociology ==
The concept of glocalization is included in the discourse on social theory. This is first demonstrated in the way it challenges the notion that globalization overrides locality by describing how the concept of local is said to be constructed on a trans- or uper-local basis or is promoted from the outside. There is also the position that the association of temporal and spatial dimensions to human life, which emerge in globalization, exert little impact. Glocalization is also said to capture the emergence of unique new indigenous realities that result in the interpenetration of the global and local spheres. The term 'glocklization', combining the glocal concept with a Glock pistol, was coined in 2018 to indicate forms of glocalization that are perceived as unbalanced and destructive to local cultural heritage.

Additionally, the concept of glocalization has strong ties to the more commonly understood term globalization, and has been described as a more general treatment of the term. Elements unique to glocalization under this umbrella include the idea that diversity is the essence of social life, that not all differences are erased, history and culture operate autonomously to offer a sense of uniqueness to the experiences of groups (whether cultures, societies or nations), glocalization removes the fear that globalization resembles a tidal wave erasing all differences, and that glocalization does not promise a world free from conflict but offers a more historically grounded and pragmatic worldview.

=== Religion ===
Glocalization can be represented throughout virtually every sphere of social society, including religion. An example of this can be seen in a study that focused on the differences in Islam in various regions of the world. In this particular study, observations made between the religious pillars in Indonesia and Morocco indicated a significant difference in religious form between the two, blending the fundamental roots with indigenous traditions and local customs. Similar studies have found that regions of the world practicing Christianity and Buddhism experienced similar shifts based on local cultural practices and norms.

== Business ==
While the term "glocalization" is one that developed later in the 20th century, the idea behind it is closely related to the economic and marketing term known as micromarketing – by definition, the "tailoring and advertising of goods and services on a global or near-global basis to increasingly differentiated local and particular markets."

=== Challenges ===
Glocalization works best for companies which have decentralized authority. The cost to the companies increases as they cannot standardise products and projects, different cultures have different needs and wants which is highlighted in this challenge.

An example of a company succeeding in creating new products for their emerging market is McDonald's new rice meals in India and China. This shows that McDonald's has done research on and understands their new market's requirements for a successful takeaway food. This however can be very costly and time-consuming. One of the main challenges for the future of glocalization is to govern it. Glocal governance is the interlinkage between global, national and local formal and informal actors that aim to find common ground, take decisions, implement and enforce them.

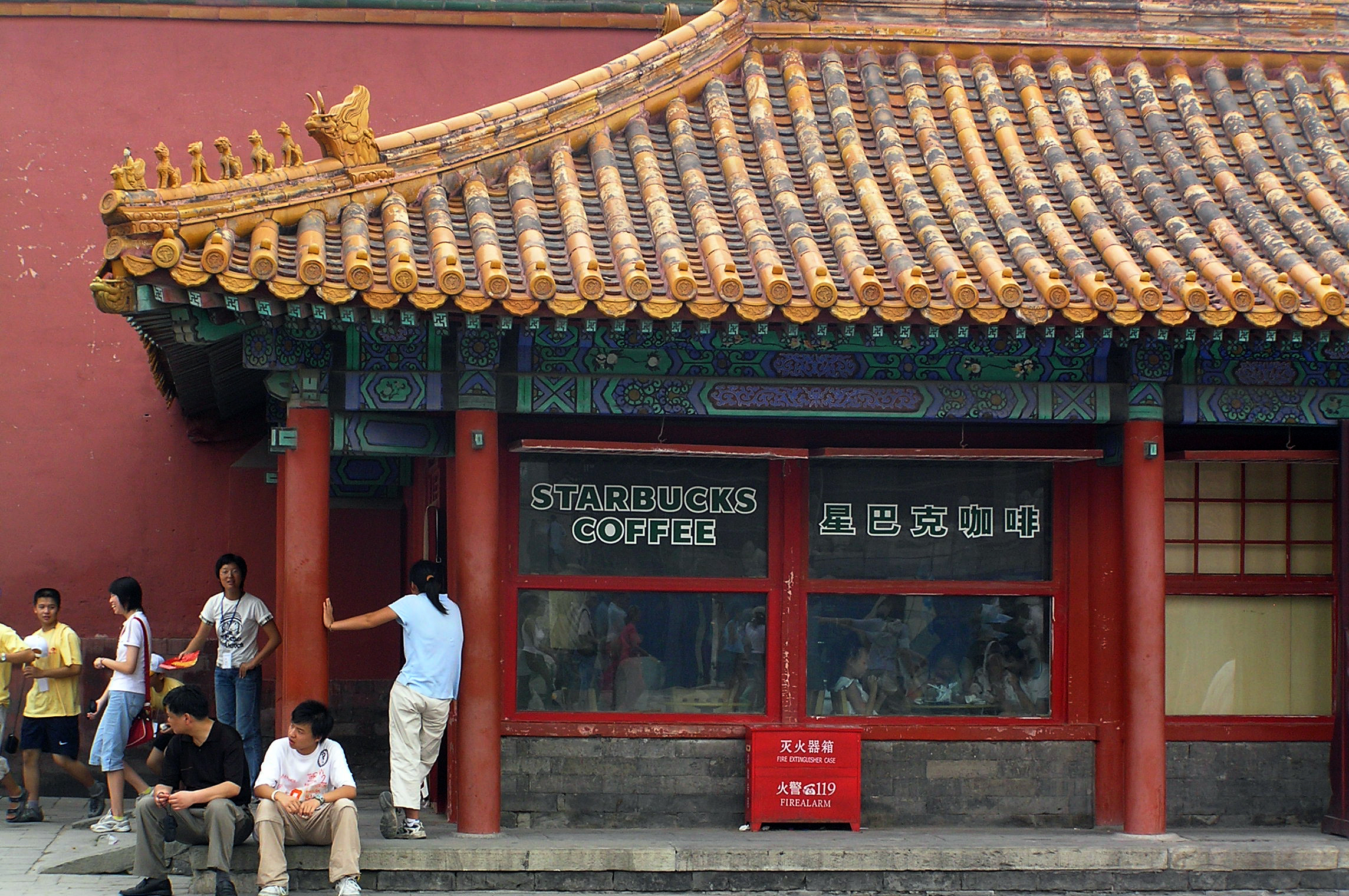
Starbucks in Forbidden City, China

An example of a global business that has faced challenges due to localization of their products can be presented through the closing of a Starbucks in the Forbidden City of China in 2007. Starbucks' attempt to localize into the culture of China by accommodating their menu to local elements such as serving green tea frappuccinos and enlarging their stores was prevalent in most areas of China, but when Starbucks spread to the Forbidden City, a problem surrounding cultural identity arose. Factors surrounding "western influences" related to Starbucks were seen as a threat by a web-based campaign which was successful in initiating the closing of the Starbucks in the Forbidden City. The leader of this campaign, Rui, stated, "All I want is that Starbucks move out of the Forbidden City peacefully and quietly, and we'll continue enjoying Starbucks coffee elsewhere in the city."

Although there are many challenges to globalisation, when done right it has many benefits; allowing companies to reach a larger target market is just one of them. Society also benefits when globalisation occurs as an increase in market competition generally pushes the price of products down which means the consumers benefit by gaining a lower price point. This decreases the inequality gap as people who couldn't previously afford products when the market was controlled by local monopolies are able to purchase the product more cheaply.

Although globalisation has benefits for the consumer, it does not always benefit the producer, with newer and smaller companies struggling to keep up with the low production costs of the multi-national competitors. This results in either a higher price and loss of consumers, or a lower profit margin, which in turn results in less competition within the market.

== Agriculture ==
Glocalization is also occurring within the agricultural sphere. One case brought up by of this has been in soy farming. Previously, there were numerous small-scale soy farms along the east coast of the US. However, as larger corporations outcompeted smaller ones, attentions have been turned abroad. Anthropologist Andrew Ofstehage refers to this change from small, personal farms to large corporate ones as an aspect of "financialization". Ofstehage expands on this concept by giving the example of the current soy market in Brazil. As financialization has led to land being more expensive and harder to come by in the states, farmers have turned their attention abroad. This farm crisis in the US was a result of increasingly large corporate farms driving out small family farms and acquiring more and more land. Due to this, farmers both new and experienced who are privileged to have capital or investors, have turned their attention abroad. Many have begun to invest in Brazilian land to grow soy with the money from friends, investors, neighbors, or savings. These transnational farmers have had great success but as more farmers have followed these steps the cycle has begun anew. Looking to further expand, farmers often take three paths for further profit and financialization. They either sell their Brazilian farms to a new hopeful farmer, or they keep their farm but return to the states to manage it internationally, or they truly begin anew. Specifically, the farmers sell their Brazilian land and turn Piauí or Tocantins, places where soy grows well, and land is still cheap.

== Education ==
Glocalization of education has been proposed in the specific areas of politics, economics, culture, teaching, information, organization, morality, spirituality, religion and "temporal" literacy. The recommended approach is for local educators to consult global resources for materials and techniques and then adapt them for local use. For example, in information, it involves advancing computer and media understanding to allow students and educators to look beyond their local context.

== Media ==
Thomas Friedman in The World Is Flat talks about how the Internet encourages glocalization, such as encouraging people to make websites in their native languages.

=== Television ===
Besides the usage of Internet, television and commercials have become useful strategies that global companies have used to help localize their products. Companies, such as McDonald's, have relied on television and commercials in not only the Western Hemisphere but in other parts of the world to attract a varying range of audiences in accordance with the demographic of the local area. For example, they have used mascots ranging anywhere from a male clown in the Western Hemisphere to attract younger audiences to an "attractive" female clown in Japan to attract older audiences.

=== Video games ===
Some translators of video games favor glocalization over the process of localization in video games. In this context, glocalization seeks from the outset to minimize localization requirements for video games intended to be universally appealing. Academic Douglas Eyman cites the Mists of Pandaria expansion for World of Warcraft as an example of glocalization because it was designed at the outset to appeal to global audiences while celebrating Chinese culture.

== Community organization ==
Glocalization, or glocalism, in community organization refers to community organizing that sees social problems as neither local or global, but interdependent and interconnected (glocal), necessitating organizing practices that concurrently address local problems and global issues. Glocal organizing techniques are commonly associated with the new community organizing, and are distinguished from other methods by emphasizing "play, creativity, joy, peer-based popular education, cultural activism, and a healthy dose of experimentation."

One of the most common glocal models of practice, functional community organization, seeks to organize communities (functional communities) around a function (i.e., a need, interest, or common problem that glocally affects people). Functional community organization emphasizes a deep understanding of issues (e.g., power, empowerment, and community interests), strategies for change (e.g., popular education, direct action, and collaboration), and communication strategies that promote "inclusive networking." The goals of functional community organization are to organize communities through direct action in order to meet immediate community need while addressing glocalized problems. In so doing, functional communities act as their own unique forms of protest, vehicles for community empowerment, and alternatives to institutionalized social welfare systems. Popular examples of functional communities include community projects such as community gardens, community technology centers, gift economy markets, food sharing, and other forms franchise activism and mutual aid.

== See also ==
- Alter-globalization
- Americanization
- Anarchism
- Cosmopolitanism
- Cultural homogenization
- Internationalization and localization
- McDonaldization
- Mobile privatization
- Fratelli tutti
