= Jeffrey I. Cole =

USC journalism professor and media analyst

Jeffrey Cole
- Occupations: Media analyst, author and speaker
- Awards: Ellis Island Medal of Honor, Ellis Island Honors Society (2023); UCLA Distinguished Teaching Award (twice)

Academic background
- Education: B.A. History, UCLA; M.A. History, UCLA; PhD Mass Communication and History, UCLA

Academic work
- Institutions: Center for the Digital Future; University of Southern California
- Website: digitalcenter.org

Jeffrey I. Cole is a media analyst and Research Professor in the Annenberg School for Communication and Journalism at the University of Southern California. He is the Founder and Director of Center for the Digital Future and the World Internet Project, the longest-running study of the impact of digital technology on users and non-users.

Cole is most known for his work studying evolving global issues in information technology and emerging media, particularly as a keynote speaker at conferences in the United States, Europe, Asia, Latin America, the Middle East, and Africa on the intersection of media and technology. He has served as an adviser on digital strategies for White House staffs in several administrations, government agencies, NGOs, and corporations.

At the announcement of the creation of the World Internet Project, former Vice President Al Gore commended Cole as a "visionary who provided valuable insights to the public on understanding the impact of media". He has also collaborated with White House staff during both the Clinton and George W. Bush administrations. Cole received the 2023 Ellis Island Medal of Honor for contributions to creating digital strategies.

Cole was a member of the Executive Committee at Academy of Television Arts & Sciences, and serves on the Investment Committee at Global Disruption Fund identifying innovative companies.

== Education ==
Cole received his undergraduate degrees and graduate training at UCLA, earning a Bachelor of Arts in Communication and Master of Arts degree, followed by a PhD in Mass Communication and History, and was elected to the Phi Beta Kappa honor society.

== Career ==
Cole began his career in the 1980s and taught Communication Studies at UCLA.

Cole was the co-creator of the Superhighway Summit at UCLA on January 11, 1994, the first public conference on digital technology that brought together the leaders in industry, government, and academic leadership in the field. The keynote speaker at the Superhighway Summit was Vice President Gore.

In 1999, Cole founded the World Internet Project (WIP), which conducts a long-term examination of the impact of computer and Internet technology across more than 35 countries.

From 1997 to 2001, Cole served as a member of the Executive Committee and the founding governor of the Academy of Television Arts & Sciences (ATAS) Interactive Media Peer Group.

In 2016, Cole was one of the founders of the Global Disruption Fund (GDF), a technology investment fund based in Australia.

Since 2017, Cole has written more than 100 columns for the Center for the Digital Future primarily focusing on topics such as disruption, media, entertainment, and technology.

From 1993 to 2004, Cole served as a Director of the UCLA Center for Communication Policy within the Anderson Graduate School of Management while also serving as a faculty member during this period. In 2004, he joined the USC Annenberg School for Communication, assuming the role of Research Professor, and concurrently, has been fulfilling the responsibilities of Director at the Center for the Digital Future.

=== Media ===
Commentary and analysis by Cole on technology, the digital realm, and the disruption caused by COVID-19 have been featured in media publications, podcasts, and interviews. At the 2023 CinemaCon, he emphasized the enduring importance of theatrical movie experiences, highlighting their significance in achieving billion-dollar box office earnings. In discussions about the Paramount's president of international theatrical distribution, he acknowledged the strength of the theatrical industry while noting the challenges faced by streaming platforms.

Cole is highlighted in an MIT Sloan Management Review feature on the regulation of Artificial Intelligence that both the United States and other countries have been slow in developing regulatory frameworks, not only for AI but also for areas like social networks. He was also featured on The Signpost, discussing the internet's impact on news where he highlighted how technology has shifted advantage and control from traditional news sources to empower citizens. In the Chicago Tribune, he emphasized evolving internet communication patterns and growing privacy concerns, with a particular focus on corporate monitoring, which he viewed as a more significant concern than government surveillance. In a New York Times article about internet users and their social interactions, he noted that people don't sacrifice their personal lives for online activities revealing that a significant portion of the population remains resistant to adopting online technologies.

=== Reports ===
Cole investigated the relationship between technology and behavior in the context of internet usage by taking part in the report aimed to document the ongoing evolution in digital technology and how Americans adapt to these changes. From 2004 to 2021 he directed the World Internet Project, compiling findings from countries in Asia, Europe, the Middle East, South America, and the United States which were featured in The Guardian, The Herald Sun, The Billings Gazette, and The Toronto Star. The reports explore a range of issues involving online technology and highlight the importance of building a global coalition of partner countries to gather knowledge about Internet use and perspectives on a worldwide scale.

=== Television industry, the U.S. Senate and the digital future ===
In the 1990s, Cole worked closely with the four broadcast networks (ABC, CBS, NBC and Fox) and U.S. Senator Paul Simon to deal with television programming issues under an anti-trust waiver that allowed the networks to work together for the first time. Cole issued annual reports on broadcast violence and related issues to the television industry, congress, and the nation. When the first report was released in Autumn 1995, There was media coverage for the quality of the reports and their contribution to the television content debate.

Within the Center for the Digital Future, Cole conducts in-depth trend analysis, research, and policy development, all aimed at maximizing the positive impact of mass media.

== Awards and honors ==
- 1987 – UCLA's Distinguished Teaching Award
- 2023 – Ellis Island Medal of Honor, Ellis Island Honors Society.
