= World Internet Project =

Global research program on the impact of digital technology

The World Internet Project (WIP) is a collaborative research program that brings together academic institutions in 46 partner countries to study the social, economic and political impact of digital technology.

== Background ==
The World Internet Project was founded in 1999 by Jeffrey I. Cole, director of the Center for the Digital Future at the University of Southern California Annenberg School of Communication and Journalism (the Center was formerly the UCLA Center for Communication Policy.) The Project was created to study the impact of the Internet and related digital technology in national and international communities.

Based at universities and research institutes, the World Internet Project conducts research, generates publications, and holds annual conferences that explore the impact of these technologies. The World Internet Project studies the views and behavior of internet users and non-users.

Each member institution conducts regular sample surveys of internet use and non-use in its country, including a series of core questions used by all of the partner countries. The critical defining characteristics of this research are that it is longitudinal, enables cross-country comparison, and includes both internet users and non-users.

The World Internet Project creates international and national reports on Internet use and behavior based on its survey results. The Project published its tenth report in November 2019.

== World Internet Project: International Partners ==
List updated November 14, 2019

Organizer

United States: Center for the Digital Future, USC Annenberg School of Communications and Journalism

Partner countries

- Africa (Botswana, Cameroon, Ethiopia, Ghana, Kenya, Mozambique, Namibia, Nigeria, Rwanda, South Africa, Tanzania, Uganda)
- Australia - ARC Centre of Excellence for Creative Industries and Innovation (CCI), Institute for Social Research, Swinburne University of Technology
- Austria - Commission for Comparative Media and Communication Studies (CMC)
- Belgium - University of Antwerp
- Canada - Canadian Internet Project (CIP). Recherche Internet Canada (RIC)
- Chile - School of Communications, Pontificia Universidad Catolica de Chile (UC)
- China - China Internet Network Information Center (CNNIC)
- Colombia – CINTEL (Centro de Investigacion de Las Telecommunicaciones
- Cyprus - Cyprus University of Technology, Department of Communication and Internet Studies
- Czech Republic - Department of Sociology, Charles University in Prague
- France - M@rsouin Network
- Greece – EKKE: (National Centre for Social Research)
- Hungary - ITHAKA- Information Society and Network Research Center
- Indonesia – AAPJII (The Indonesia Association of Internet Service Providers
- Israel - The Research Center for Internet Psychology (CIP) Sammy Ofer School of Communications, The Interdisciplinary Center (IDC)
- Italy - SDA Bocconi, Bocconi University
- Japan - Rikkyo University, College of Sociology
- Macao - University of Macao, Macao Internet Project
- Mexico - Tecnológico de Monterrey
- Middle East (Bahrain, Egypt, Jordan, Lebanon, Qatar, Saudi Arabia, Tunisia, United Arab Emirates
- New Zealand - New Zealand Work Research Institute, Auckland University of Technology
- Portugal - Lisbon Internet and Networks International Research Programme (LINI)
- Qatar - Northwestern University in Qatar
- Russia - Sholokhov Moscow State University for Humanities
- South Africa - South African Network Society Survey, Wits Journalism, University of Witwatersrand
- Sweden - The Internet Foundation in Sweden (IIS)
- Switzerland - Division on Media Change & Innovation, IPMZ – Institute of Mass Communication and Media Research, University of Zurich
- Taiwan - Taiwan e-Governance Research Center, Department of Public Administration, National Chengchi University
- Uruguay - Universidad Catolica del Uruguay
