= Networked: The New Social Operating System =

2012 book by Lee Rainie

- Author: Lee Rainie and Barry Wellman
- Publisher: MIT Press
- Publication date: 2012
- Pages: 358
- ISBN: 978-0262017190

Networked: The New Social Operating System is a book by Lee Rainie and Barry Wellman published in 2012.
