= Vincent Chua =

Singaporean sociologist

Vincent Chua is a Singaporean Sociologist. He is an assistant professor in the Department of Sociology at the National University of Singapore. Vincent Chua received his PhD in sociology from the University of Toronto in November 2010. His research interests are in social networks and social capital, social support, education, neighbourhoods and ethnic stratification. He is interested in how institutional factors such as labour markets and education affect the job search and networking practices of people.
