= Caroline Haythornthwaite =

Canadian information studies scholar

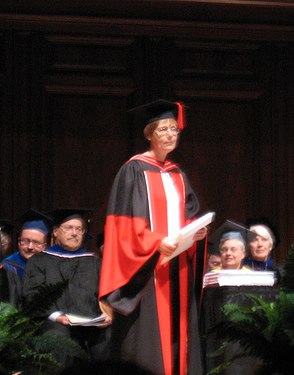
- Caroline Haythornthwaite, 13 May 2007
- Occupations: Director, Professor, Researcher
- Writing career
- Language: English
- Notable works: E-learning Theory and Practice; The Internet in Everyday Life
- Website: www.haythorn.wordpress.com

Caroline Haythornthwaite is a professor emerita at Syracuse University School of Information Studies. She served as the school's director of the library science graduate program from July 2017 to June 2019. She previously served as director and professor at the Library, Archival and Information Studies, School of SLAIS, at The iSchool at The University of British Columbia (UBC). Her research areas explore the way interaction, via computer media, supports and affects work, learning, and social interaction, primarily from a social-network-analysis perspective. Previously, during 1996–2010, at the University of Illinois at Urbana-Champaign (UIUC), Haythornthwaite had worked as assistant professor, associate, or full professor in the Graduate School of Library and Information Science (GSLIS).

== Education ==
In 1975, Haythornthwaite graduated from Trent University, Peterborough, Ontario, where she completed a BSc degree in psychology. After completing her BSc degree, Haythornthwaite completed a master's degree in psychology, graduating a year later in 1976 from the University of Toronto. After a number of years in employment, Haythornthwaite completed an M.I.S. in information science at the University of Toronto in 1992, before going on to complete her Ph.D. in information science in 1996.

== University associations ==
Before being named professor at Syracuse in 2016, Haythornthwaite was professionally associated with two universities. After spending 14 years as a faculty member at the UIUC Graduate School of Library and Information Science, Haythornthwaite was director and professor at University of British Columbia School of Library, Archival and Information Studies a position she held beginning in 2010.

== Authored work ==
Haythornthwaite has authored and co-authored a variety of publications ranging from books to academic lectures, including the following material:

- Wellman, B. & Haythornthwaite, C. (Eds.) (2002). The Internet in Everyday Life. Oxford, UK: Blackwell Publishers.
- Haythornthwaite, C. & Kazmer, M.M. (Eds.) (2004). Learning, Culture and Community in Online Education: Research and Practice. NY: Peter Lang.
- Consalvo, M. & Haythornthwaite, C. (Eds.) (2006). AoIR Internet Annual, Volume 4. NY: Peter Lang.
- Andrews, R. & Haythornthwaite, C. (Eds.) (2007). Handbook of E-Learning Research. London: Sage.
- Haythornthwaite, C. & Andrews, R. (2011). E-learning Theory and Practice. London: Sage.

=== Learning Networks (Leverhulme Trust Public Lectures) ===
Between December 2009 and May 2010 Haythornthwaite gave a series of public lectures for the Leverhulme Trust at the London Knowledge Lab. These lectures were focused around her primary research areas at the time which was social networks, computer networks, and e-learning. During her stay in the United Kingdom Haythornthwaite gave a total of six lectures listed in further detail below:

- Learning in the age of web 2.0 (1 December 2009)
- Learning and scholarly communication in the age of the Internet (4 February 2010)
- New theories and perspectives on learning in the digital age (23 February 2010)
- Social networks and learning (11 March 2010)
- Social informatics (30 March 2010)
- Ubiquitous learning (10 May 2010)

== Academic research areas ==
Haythornthwaite's research focuses on how the Internet and information and communication technologies (ICTs) support work, learning and social interaction, and is approached primarily from a social network analysis perspective. Her academic areas of research and research interests include the following:

- E-learning
- Computer-Mediated Communication
- Organizational Theory
- Computer Supported Collaborative Learning (CSCL)
- Educational Informatics
- Sociology Of Scientific Knowledge
- Sociology Of Technology (Science And Technology Studies)
- Group Behaviour
- Peer Production

== Current professional position ==
Haythorthwaite was named to the faculty at Syracuse's iSchool in June, 2016. She served as director of the school's library science graduate program from July 2017 to 2019.

== Past professional positions ==
University of British Columbia: Haythornthwaite began working for the University of British Columbia. at the School of Library, Archival and Information Sciences at the university's iSchool in 2010. Haythornthwaite was a director and professor at the university. She also had further roles at the university as she was a member of a number of committees including the UBC Scholarly Communications Steering Committee and the UBC advisory committee for policy review on information systems and assets use and security. Haythornthwaite is interested in how the Internet and information and communication technologies (ICTs) can support learning, work and the social interaction between people. This interest can be seen throughout her research which focuses on this area. Her research is conducted through the analysis of social networks.

Institute Of Education, University of London: Commencing 2009 and finishing in 2010, Haythornthwaite was a Leverhulme Trust visiting professor at the Institute of Education, University of London. The year at the Institute of Education entailed research, writing and public presentations on the topic of Learning Networks. This research encompassed overlapping themes of social networks, computer networks and learning. A result of Haythornthwaite's time at the Institute of Education was the book E-learning Theory and Practice, co-authored with Institute of Education Professor Richard Andrews.

Graduate School of Library and Information Science (GSLIS), University of Illinois at Urbana-Champaign (UIUC): Commencing 1996 and finishing in 2010, Haythornthwaite was employed at the UIUC Graduate School of Library and Information Science (GSLIS), University of Illinois at Urbana-Champaign (UIUC). In Haythornthwaite's time at GSLIS UIUC, she held a number of academic positions: from 1996 to 2002 Haythornthwaite was assistant professor GSLIS, UIUC, 2002–2008 Haythornthwaite was associate professor GSLIS, UIUC. In 2008 Haythornthwaite was made professor GSLIS, UIUC and remained in this post until 2010.

== Co-authored works ==
Haythornthwaite has written many journals, articles and has co-authored five books to date. These books focus on the Internet, E-learning and the culture and communities in online education.

=== E-learning Theory and Practice ===
Written by both Haythornthwaite and Richard Andrew, E-learning Theory and Practice came out in 2011. This book aims to help those involved in E-learning to gain an understanding of new learning practices and for the learners themselves to gain an understanding of their role as active participants in both classroom and lifelong learning.

=== Handbook of E-Learning Research ===
Haythornthwaite co-edited with Richard Andrews The SAGE Handbook of E-learning Research in 2007. This book provides the reader with substantial literature reviews of E-learning research. This book contains the basics of E-learning as well as new perspectives in the area. A second edition of mainly new chapters was published in 2016, co-edited with Richard Andrews, Jude Fransman and Eric Meyers.

=== AoIR Internet Annual, Volume 4 ===
In 2006 Haythornthwaite worked with Mia Consalvo to produce AoIR Internet Annual, Volume 4. This book is a collection of highlights from a number of scholars who made contributions at the 2005 Association of Internet Researchers conference or AoIR conference.

=== Learning, Culture and Community in Online Education: Research and Practice ===
In 1996 the Graduate School of Library and Information Science at the University of Illinois at Urbana-Champaign began the Library Experimental Education Program (LEEP). This allowed learners from across the US and the world to take part in an Internet-based program which enabled them to earn a master's degree. The aim of this book was to bring together new research concerning online education and used the LEEP program as a model to show the benefits of online education, and was edited by Haythornthwaite and Michelle. M. Kazmer.

=== The Internet in Everyday Life ===
Edited by Haythornthwaite and Barry Wellman, the Internet in Everyday Life concentrated on 19 studies. These studies were used to discuss the domestication of the Internet in day-to-day life and also brought about the idea of new questions and methodologies that may need to be asked in the future of Internet Studies.

== Commentary on Haythornthwaite's work ==
=== The Internet in Everyday Life ===
Writing about Haythornthwaite and Wellman's popular 2002 edited volume, The Internet in Everyday Life, Mary Chayko of the College of Saint Elizabeth stated that the arguments in the book relied too heavily on quantitative research data, the nature of which would result in the contributors' findings soon becoming obsolete. Robert E. Wood supported this in his review of the book as well, as seeing a need for more contextual research, stating that "The studies make important statements at this level — based mainly on large-scale surveys and quantitative analyses — but collectively also point toward the need for more fine-grained and context-specific studies". Wood also describes the "vast generalisations" the contributors make during a number of the book's chapters.

Kris Cohen of the University of Surrey and Chicago took this notion a step further during his review of the book, telling of a narrative that has appeared in similar literature and is present in 'The Internet in Everyday Life'. This narrative describes how 'qualitative and quantitative researchers, social scientists and Humanities researchers, continue to work, each in our own worlds, heedless'.

Cohen raises another issue with 'The Internet in Everyday Life', criticising the book as being too 'polemic'. Cohen states that a 'study of [Internet] users in Pittsburgh, which suggested that heavy internet use might lead to depression and isolation, received national attention from the media' by Kraut et al. (1998) is a reference to thirteen out of twenty (65%) of essays referenced in the book, and eighteen out of twenty essays (90%) respond explicitly to the moralistic question set forth by Kraut et al., "thereby accepting its terms and conditions". Cohen also sees a contradiction in this bias, with Haythornthwaite setting out to address Kraut et al.'s moralistic question by 'rejecting the question' itself, whilst the other contributors get trapped in that paper's moralistic framework.

=== Learning Culture and Community in Online Education: Research and Practice ===
In her mainly positive review of Haythornthwaite's & Kazmer's edited collection, Learning, Culture and Community in Online Education: Research and Practice' Nora Wright of the University of California found one problem with the paper, in that it appears less approachable to students and researchers than the content would suggest. Wright states that the paper is not for "library information science people only, although it may seem to be at first glance".

== Conference appearances ==
Hawaii International Conference on System Sciences: Haythornthwaite is one of the organizers of the Social Networking and Community minitrack at HICSS, and the Learning Analytics and Networked Learning minitrack, now titled Social Media and Learning at the conference.

Learning Analytics and Knowledge: Haythornthwaite is one of the co-founders of the Society for Learning Analytics Research, and co-organized the 2012 Learning Analytics and Knowledge conference.
