= Networked individualism =

Social structures based on individuals

Networked individualism represents the shift of the classical model of social arrangements formed around hierarchical bureaucracies or social groups that are tightly-knit, like households and work groups, to connected individuals, using the means provided by the evolution of information and communications technology. Although the turn to networked individualism started before the advent of the internet, it has been fostered by the development of social media networks.

== Origin of the term ==
The term was coined by Barry Wellman in 2000, and first published by Manuel Castells and Barry Wellman in 2001. It was elaborated on by Lee Rainie and Barry Wellman in their 2012 book Networked: The New Social Operating System (MIT Press).

== Definition ==
The networked individuals are members of diverse groups in which they seek different things; for instance, the same set of individuals could be in a group used to seek emotional support while another group might be used to get good addresses in a city. Those groups can be dispersed around the globe, and the combination of those networks make for a highly individualized, and well-networked, person.

This new world of networked individualism is oriented around looser, more fragmented networks that provide on-demand succor. Such networks had already formed before the coming of the internet. In incorporating the internet and mobile phones into their lives, people have changed the ways they interact with each other. They have become increasingly networked as individuals, rather than embedded in groups. In the world of networked individuals, it is the person who is the focus; more than the family, the work unit, the neighborhood, and the social group.

== Typology of networked individualism ==
Recent research has suggested a variety in networked individualism. Networked individuals are members of multiple, loosely-knit social circles. Bounded individuals belong to only a few social circles. Limited individuals have the smaller number of social ties.

== Implications for the future of society ==
Social relationships are changing, and technology is a driving force in many of these changes. There are some fears that the digital technologies are killing society, but studies by the Pew Internet Project show that these technologies are not isolated – or isolating – systems. They are being incorporated into people’s social lives much like their predecessors were.

Barry Wellman questioned the future of networked individualism after the event of the September 11 attacks in his short essay, The Rise (and Possible Fall) of Networked Individualism.
