= Outline of community =

Overview of and topical guide to community

The following outline is provided as an overview of topics relating to community.

A community is a group of people whose identity as a group lies in their interaction and sharing. Many factors may affect the identity of the participants and their degree of adhesion, such as intent, belief, resources, preferences, needs and risks.

== Types of communities ==
=== Geographic and physical communities ===
Human geography – who people are and where they live

- European Union – founded on March 25, 1957, by the signing of the Treaty of Rome
- Community council – tier of local government in Wales and Scotland
- Autonomous communities of Spain – Spain's fifty provinces are grouped into seventeen autonomous communities
- Communities, regions and language areas of Belgium
- Local community – town, city, neighborhood, rural area, or any locale and everyone in it
- Unincorporated community – geographic area having a common social identity
- Residential community – small town or city, composed mostly of residents
- Intentional Community – planned residential community, usually of people that share personal and cultural values.
  - Cohousing – intentional community composed of private homes centered around a common house and other common facilities.
  - Ecovillage – intentional community formed with social, economic, and ecological sustainability as its goal.
  - Commune (intentional community) – intentional community where most resources are shared and there is little or no personal property (as opposed to communities that only share housing)
  - Monastery – community of monks practicing a religious discipline
  - Convent – community of clergy particularly in the Roman Catholic Church and, to a lesser degree, in the Anglican Church
  - World Brotherhood Colonies – idea for spiritual based intentional communities based on shared spiritual principles, begun by Paramahansa Yogananda

==== Global community ====
- World community – global aspects of community from the perspective of governance and the humanities
- International community – global aspects of community from the perspective of governance and the humanities
- Global village – global aspects of community from the perspective of telecommunications

=== Ideational or abstract communities ===
- Business community – total body of business people its relationships and interactions
- Religious congregation – total body of religious people its relationships and interactions
- intentional community – total body of religious people its relationships and interactions
- Scientific community – total body of scientists, its relationships and interactions
- Epistemic community – those who accept one version of a story
- Discourse Community – users of a particular style of language
- Moral community – group of people drawn together by a common interest in living according to a particular moral philosophy
- Voluntary association – group of individuals who voluntarily enter into an agreement to accomplish a purpose
- Cooperative – group of persons who join (co-operate) to carry on an economic activity of mutual benefit

=== Associative communities ===
Community of...

- Action – group of people organized to support a cause or bring about social change
- Circumstance – group of people bound together because of circumstances usually beyond their control
- Interest – group of people who share a common interest or passion
- Place – group of people bound together because of where they spend a continuous portion of their time
- Position – group of people who share a particular station in life (such as teenage years, marriage, parenthood, etc.)
- Practice – group of people who choose to collaborate over an extended period to share ideas, find solutions, and build innovations.
- Purpose – group of people who are going through the same process or are trying to achieve a similar objective

see Group (sociology)

==== Cooperatives ====
- Housing cooperative – legal entity that owns real estate, usually one or more residential buildings
- Retailers' cooperative – network of retailers which employs economies of scale to get discounts from manufacturers and to pool marketing
- Consumers' cooperative – cooperative which employs economies of scale to get discounts from distributors
- Utility cooperative – public utility such as electric, water or telecommunications owned by its members
- Worker cooperative – business entity owned in part or exclusively by its workers

=== Other ===
- Affinity group – small group of activists (usually from 3-20) who work together on direct action
- Intentional community – planned residential community with a much higher degree of social interaction than other communities
- Learning community – cohort-based, interdisciplinary approach to higher education covering distinct fields of study
- Virtual community – See Virtual community section below
- Web community

== Actual communities ==
Lists of communities, co-ops, etc.:

- Intentional communities
- Cooperatives

Lists of virtual communities:

- Benchmark virtual communities
- Additional virtual community listings

The world community:

Note to dialup users: the following lists are massive

- List of countries (a comprehensive list of List of sovereign states)
- List of subnational entities (a comprehensive list of subnational entities, such as states, provinces, communities, etc.)

=== Online communities ===
- Craigslist – centralized network of urban online communities, featuring free classified advertisements (with jobs, housing, personals, for sale/barter/wanted, services, community, gigs and resumes categories) and forums sorted by various topics

== Community concepts, movements and schools of thought ==
- Affinity (sociology) – in terms of sociology, refers to "kinship of spirit", interest and other interpersonal commonalities
- Cenobitic – monastic tradition that stresses community life as opposed to eremitic (like a hermit).
- Collective – group of people who share common interests, working together to achieve a common objective
- Collectivism – school of thought, antithetical to Individualism, in which the collective takes precedence over the individual
- Communitarianism – group of related but distinct philosophies advocating phenomena such as civil society
- Communitas – Latin noun for the spirit of community having significance in cultural anthropology and the social sciences.
- Community politics – movement in British politics to re-engage people with political action on a local level
- Community television – television stations that are owned and operated by communities rather than governments or corporations
- Consanguinity – quality of being descended from the same ancestor as another person
- Consensus decision-making – inclusive decision-making processes that accommodate even the minority
- Emergence – complex pattern formation from simpler rules
- Gemeinschaft and Gesellschaft – terms introduced by German sociologist Ferdinand Tönnies to distinguish community from society
- Group (sociology) – collection of people who share characteristics, interact and have a common identity
- Group dynamics – field of study within the social sciences that focuses on the nature of groups
- Imagined communities – concept that nations are socially constructed by the imaginations of people
- Internationalism (politics) – political movement which advocates cooperation between nations for the benefit of all
- Interpersonal relationship – connection, affiliation or association between two or more people
- Liminality – period of transition related to initiation, rite of passage or other entry into a group
- Meeting – two or more people coming together to have discussions or produce a predetermined output, often in a formalized way
- Meritocracy – form of government based on rule by ability (merit) rather than by wealth or other determinants of social position.
- Organization – formal group of people with one or more shared goals
- Organizational learning – area of knowledge that looks at how an organization learns and adapts
- Plenary session – part of a meeting when all members of all parties are in attendance
- Scientific Community Metaphor – approach in computer science to understanding and performing scientific communities
- Sense of community – look from the psychological perspective at how and why communities form and why people join them
- Small-group communication – communication in a context that mixes interpersonal communication interactions with social clustering
- Social capital – concept with a variety of inter-related definitions, based on the economic value of social networks
- Socialization – process by which people learn to adopt the behavior patterns of the community in which they live
- Solidarity (sociology) – feeling or condition of unity based on common goals, interests, and sympathies among a group's members

=== Academic subjects ===
- Community studies – academic discipline, drawing on sociology and anthropology with emphasis on ethnography (participant observation)
- Community psychology – use of the principles of psychology to understand how communities work (or fail to work)
- Computational sociology – recently developed branch of sociology that uses computation to analyze social phenomena
- Cultural anthropology – field of anthropology comprising the holistic study of humanity
- Internet studies – emerging field of academia dealing with the interaction between the Internet and modern society
- Organizational Development – branch of Sociology that deals with how and why people organize themselves
- Philosophy of social science – scholarly elucidation and debate of accounts of the nature of the social sciences
- Rural sociology – field of sociology associated with the study of life in small towns and the country.
- Social geography – how society affects geographical features and how environmental factors affect society.
- Social philosophy – philosophical study of interesting questions about social behavior (typically, of humans).
- Social sciences – groups of academic disciplines that study the human aspects of the world using scientific methods
- Sociocultural evolution – theories of cultural evolution and social evolution – describing how cultures and societies have developed over time
- Urban planning – discipline which deals with the development of metropolitan areas, municipalities and neighbourhoods

=== Community development ===
Community development – efforts to improve communities:

- Community organizing – process by which people are brought together to act in common self-interest
- Community building – the more informal (or intangible) aspects of community development; the establishment, broadening and deepening of links between community members
- Community economic development – efforts to improve the material aspects of local communities
- Community development planning – Public participatory and usually interactive town or neighborhood planning and design
- Community practice – type of social work practice that focuses on community level interventions
- Community service – service (voluntary or compulsory) that a person performs for the benefit of his or her local community

=== Virtual community concepts ===
Virtual community Virtual community – group of people communicating with each other by means of information technologies:

- Bulletin board system –
- Chat room – online site in which people can chat online (talk by broadcasting messages to people on the same site in real time)
- Computer-mediated communication –
- Discourse community –
- Electronic mailing list – special usage of e-mail that allows for widespread distribution of information to many Internet users
- Internet activism –
- Internet forum –
- Internet social network –
- Massively distributed collaboration –
- Motivations for Contributing to Online Communities –
- Massively Multiplayer Online Role-playing Games
- Network of practice –
- Online deliberation –
- Social network –
- Social evolutionary computation –
- The Virtual Community –
- Usenet – distributed Internet discussion system that evolved from a general purpose UUCP network of the same name
- Virtual Community of Practice –
- Virtual Ethnography –
- Virtual reality –
- Web community –
- Web of trust –
- Wireless community projects – development of interlinked computer networks
- World Wide Web – global, read-write information space

See also Category:Virtual communities

=== Other community topics ===
- Global Ecovillage Network – global association of people and communities (ecovillages) dedicated to living "sustainable plus" lives
- Communication – process of sending information to oneself or another entity – usually via a language
- Gathering place – phenomenal natural location crucial to culture and civilization
- Community Boards – community-based mediation program, established in 1976, in San Francisco, California – USA
- Community garden – small plots of land allocated to groups of people by some organization for collective gardening
- WELL – (Whole Earth Lectronic Link or The WELL) - one of the oldest virtual communities still online.
- The Farm (Tennessee) – spiritual intentional community in Summertown, Tennessee – known informally as a hippie commune

== Community institutions ==
- Community college – educational institution providing post-secondary education
- Community wind energy – projects that are locally owned by farmers, investors, businesses, schools, utilities, or other public or private entities who utilise wind energy to support and reduce energy costs to the local community
- Community foundations – institutions that pool donations into coordinated investments for grants
- Community (trade union) – trade union in the UK

== See also ==
- Community art
- Historian Benedict Anderson's Imagined Communities
- Mobile community
- Original affluent society hunter-gatherer aspects of Marshall Sahlins (1966)
- Sustainable community
- Communities of innovation
- Tragedy of the commons and Tragedy of the anticommons

Other uses of the term "community"

- Community: A NewOrderOnline Tribute, a tribute album (music recording)
- Biological community, all the interacting organisms living together in a specific habitat

== Resources ==
See: List of community topics: Resources
