= Karen Countryman-Roswurm =

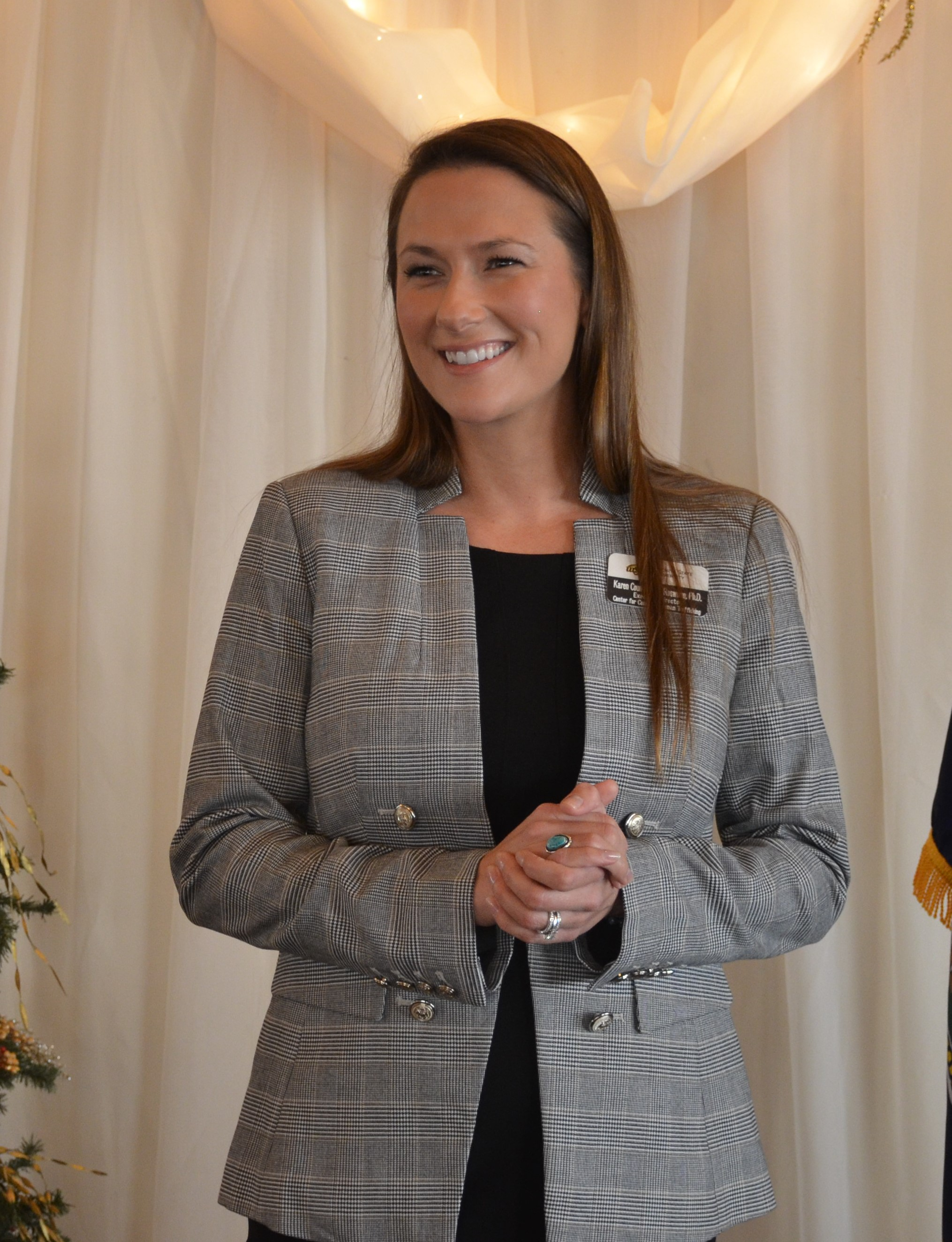
- Countryman-Roswurm in 2018
- Born: Karen Countryman; 1980 (age 45–46); Wichita, Kansas, US
- Education: Wichita State University (BSW, MSW, PhD)
- Occupations: Social worker, professor, academic administrator

Karen Irene Countryman-Roswurm (born June 5, 1980) is a Native American (Blackfoot) social worker, professor, and academic administrator who specializes in the field of human trafficking and other forms of exploitation. She is an associate professor in the school of social work at Wichita State University and the founder and executive director of the Wichita State University Center for Combating Human Trafficking (CCHT).

== Early life and education ==
When she was 13, Countryman-Roswurm's mother died and she subsequently spent her adolescence on the run, on the streets, and in and out of foster homes, and a children's home. Despite this, Countryman-Roswurm completed her GED and successfully became an emancipated minor from state custody at age 16. She is the only Kansas child to do so to this date. Following her emancipation, she was hired to be a street outreach peer counselor through the same children's home she had previously received services from.

Countryman-Roswurm received her undergraduate degree in social work in 2005, her masters social work degree in 2006, and her doctorate in community psychology in 2012, all from Wichita State University.

== Career ==
Countryman-Roswurm began working as a peer counselor in street outreach services and has since worked across the country as a therapist, in youth programs, community organizing, and advocating for vulnerable populations. Currently, Countryman-Roswurm serves as a tenured associate professor in the Wichita State University School of Social Work and as the Founding Executive Director of the Wichita State University Center for Combating Human Trafficking.

Much of Countryman-Roswurm's recent work has been advocating for survivors of sex trafficking in Kansas, and across the country, who have been unjustly criminalized.

== Her Federal Lawsuit against employer Wichita State University ==
Read Detail here: https://thesunflower.com/58510/news/social-work-professor-files-federal-lawsuit-against-wichita-state-administration /// Read 115-page Lawsuit filing here: https://ecf.ksd.uscourts.gov/cgi-bin/show_public_doc?2021cv2489-24

== Honors and awards ==
- 2014: Inaugural Pat Ayars Mentoring Award given by the Wichita Business Journal
- 2015: The National Convening on Trafficking and Child Welfare in the White House
- 2017: Martin Luther King Jr., Education Award given by The Kansas African American Museum
