= Community of purpose =

A community of purpose is a community of people who are going through the same process or journey to achieve a similar, often emergent, objective.

From user-generated reviews or collaborative filtering on a site such as Amazon.com which help people decide what to buy to the reputation system at eBay which gives users a sense of who they are dealing with before they transact, the community fuels collective accomplishment. The impact of a given community of purpose is directly proportional to the potential of its participants to get something done. To achieve impact, communities need the right scale (number of participants), the right level of engagement (participation and involvement) and the right collective capability in relation to the declared "purpose" of the community.

Effective communities of practice achieve a balancing act between offering the right capabilities and ensuring sufficient capacity to deliver efficiently. Communities of purpose can address a collective need, rather than a self-interest or defined goal typical of communities of practice and other forms of community, and can often generate unexpected results. Consequently, true communities of purpose are often an example of a complex adaptive system, unpredictable and among the least explored digital or physical community vehicles.

== See also ==
- Community of action
- Community of circumstance
- Community of interest
- Community of inquiry
- Community of position
- Community of place
- Community of practice
