= Social constructivism =

Sociological theory of knowledge

Social constructivism is a sociological theory of knowledge according to which human development is socially situated, and knowledge is constructed through interaction with others. Like social constructionism, social constructivism states that people work together to actively construct artifacts. But while social constructionism focuses on ontology, social constructivism focuses on epistemology.

A very simple example is an object like a cup. The object can be used for many things, but its shape does suggest some 'knowledge' about carrying liquids (see also Affordance). A more complex example is an online course—not only do the 'shapes' of the software tools indicate certain things about the way online courses should work, but the activities and texts produced within the group as a whole will help shape how each person behaves within that group. A person's cognitive development will also be influenced by the culture that they are involved in, such as the language, history, and social context.

== Philosophy ==
Strong social constructivism as a philosophical approach tends to suggest that "the natural world has a small or non-existent role in the construction of scientific knowledge". According to Maarten Boudry and Filip Buekens, Freudian psychoanalysis is a good example of this approach in action. However, Boudry and Buekens do not claim that 'bona fide' science is completely immune from all socialisation and paradigm shifts, merely that the strong social constructivist claim that all scientific knowledge is constructed ignores the reality of scientific success.

One characteristic of social constructivism is that it rejects the role of superhuman necessity in either the invention/discovery of knowledge or its justification. In the field of invention it looks to contingency as playing an important part in the origin of knowledge, with historical interests and resourcing swaying the direction of mathematical and scientific knowledge growth. In the area of justification while acknowledging the role of logic and reason in testing, it also accepts that the criteria for acceptance vary and change over time. Thus mathematical proofs follow different standards in the present and throughout different periods in the past, as Paul Ernest argues.

== Education ==
Social constructivism has been studied by many educational psychologists, who are concerned with its implications for teaching and learning. Social constructivism extends constructivism by incorporating the role of other actors and culture in development. In this sense it can also be contrasted with social learning theory by stressing interaction over observation. For more on the psychological dimensions of social constructivism, see the work of A. Sullivan Palincsar. Psychological tools are one of the key concepts in Lev Vygotsky's sociocultural perspective.

Studies on increasing the use of student discussion in the classroom both support and are grounded in theories of social constructivism. There is a full range of advantages that results from the implementation of discussion in the classroom. Participating in group discussion allows students to generalize and transfer their knowledge of classroom learning and builds a strong foundation for communicating ideas orally. Many studies argue that discussion plays a vital role in increasing student ability to test their ideas, synthesize the ideas of others, and build deeper understanding of what they are learning. Large and small group discussion also affords students opportunities to exercise self-regulation, self-determination, and a desire to persevere with tasks. Additionally, discussion increases student motivation, collaborative skills, and the ability to problem solve. Increasing students’ opportunity to talk with one another and discuss their ideas increases their ability to support their thinking, develop reasoning skills, and to argue their opinions persuasively and respectfully. Furthermore, the feeling of community and collaboration in classrooms increases through offering more chances for students to talk together.

Studies have found that students are not regularly accustomed to participating in academic discourse. Martin Nystrand argues that teachers rarely choose classroom discussion as an instructional format. The results of Nystrand’s (1996) three-year study focusing on 2400 students in 60 different classrooms indicate that the typical classroom teacher spends under three minutes an hour allowing students to talk about ideas with one another and the teacher. Even within those three minutes of discussion, most talk is not true discussion because it depends upon teacher-directed questions with predetermined answers. Multiple observations indicate that students in low socioeconomic schools and lower track classrooms are allowed even fewer opportunities for discussion. Discussion and interactive discourse promote learning because they afford students the opportunity to use language as a demonstration of their independent thoughts. Discussion elicits sustained responses from students that encourage meaning-making through negotiating with the ideas of others. This type of learning “promotes retention and in-depth processing associated with the cognitive manipulation of information”.

One recent branch of work exploring social constructivist perspectives on learning focuses on the role of social technologies and social media in facilitating the generation of socially constructed knowledge and understanding in online environments.

=== Academic writing ===
In a constructivist approach, the focus is on the sociocultural conventions of academic discourse such as citing evidence, hedging and boosting claims, interpreting the literature to back one's own claims, and addressing counter claims. These conventions are inherent to a constructivist approach as they place value on the communicative, interpersonal nature of academic writing with a strong focus on how the reader receives the message. The act of citing others’ work is more than accurate attribution; it is an important exercise in critical thinking in the construction of an authorial self.

== See also ==
- Constructivist epistemology
- Educational psychology
- Experiential learning
- Learning theory
- Virtual community
