= American Journal of Community Psychology =

- Discipline: Community psychology
- Language: English
- Edited by: Emilie Smith

Publication details
- History: 1973-present
- Publisher: Wiley
- Frequency: Quarterly
- Impact factor: 3.554 (2020)

Standard abbreviations
- ISO 4: Am. J. Community Psychol.

Indexing
- CODEN: AJCPCK
- ISSN: 0091-0562 (print); 1573-2770 (web)
- LCCN: 75640658
- OCLC no.: 1798402

Links
- Journal homepage; Online access; Online archive

The American Journal of Community Psychology (AJCP) is a quarterly peer-reviewed academic journal covering community psychology. It was established in 1973 by Charles D. Spielberger, with previous editors including Julian Rappaport, Edison Trickett (1993–1999), Bill Davidson (1999–2010), Jacob Tebes (2010–2018) and Nicole E. Allen (2018–2024), the first woman to hold the position. AJCP is published by Wiley (publisher). The editor-in-chief as of 2024 is Emilie Smith (Michigan State University). Smith is the first BIPOC scholar to hold this position. In 2023, the journal had a two-year impact factor of 3.4 and a five-year impact factor of 4.2. According to Clarivate's journal impact factor report, AJCP is consistently ranked as a top journal in the categories of Psychology, Multidisciplinary, Public, Environmental & Occupational Health, and Social Work.

In addition to publishing original research, the journal publishes empirical reviews, policy statements, editorials and first-person accounts.

The journal is the official publication of the Society for Community Research and Action, a division of the American Psychological Association.
