= Stephanie M. Reich =

Community psychologist

- Education: UCLA (BA), Vanderbilt (PhD)
- Known for: Educational research, Community psychology
- Scientific career
- Fields: Education, Community psychology
- Workplaces: University of California, Irvine

Stephanie M. Reich is a professor in the School of Education at the University of California, Irvine. As a community psychologist, Professor Reich focuses on understanding and improving the broader social context of children’s lives. In particular, her academic work focuses on parents and peers, two primary contributors to children’s socialization. In her empirical investigations, Professor Reich explores how family, school, and online environments directly and indirectly influence young people. Her research on family influences has focused on parenting behaviors and how factors such as maternal knowledge, efficacy, support, and home and community environment can have direct and moderational influences on young people’s development. Professor Reich’s research on peer influences has focused on the relationships among individual behaviors (e.g., aggression, emotional regulation, prosocial behavior), peer interactions (e.g., in-person and on-line) and child outcomes.

Professor Reich’s work spans disciplines such as psychology, pediatric medicine, literacy, digital media and learning, and education and focuses on creating interventions that promote young people’s physical and mental well-being and their academic success.

Professor Reich earned a B.A. in Psychology from the University of California, Los Angeles and a Ph.D. in Community Psychology from the Department of Psychology and Human Development at Vanderbilt University.
