= Community of inquiry =

Group of people involved in a process of empirical or conceptual inquiry into a situation

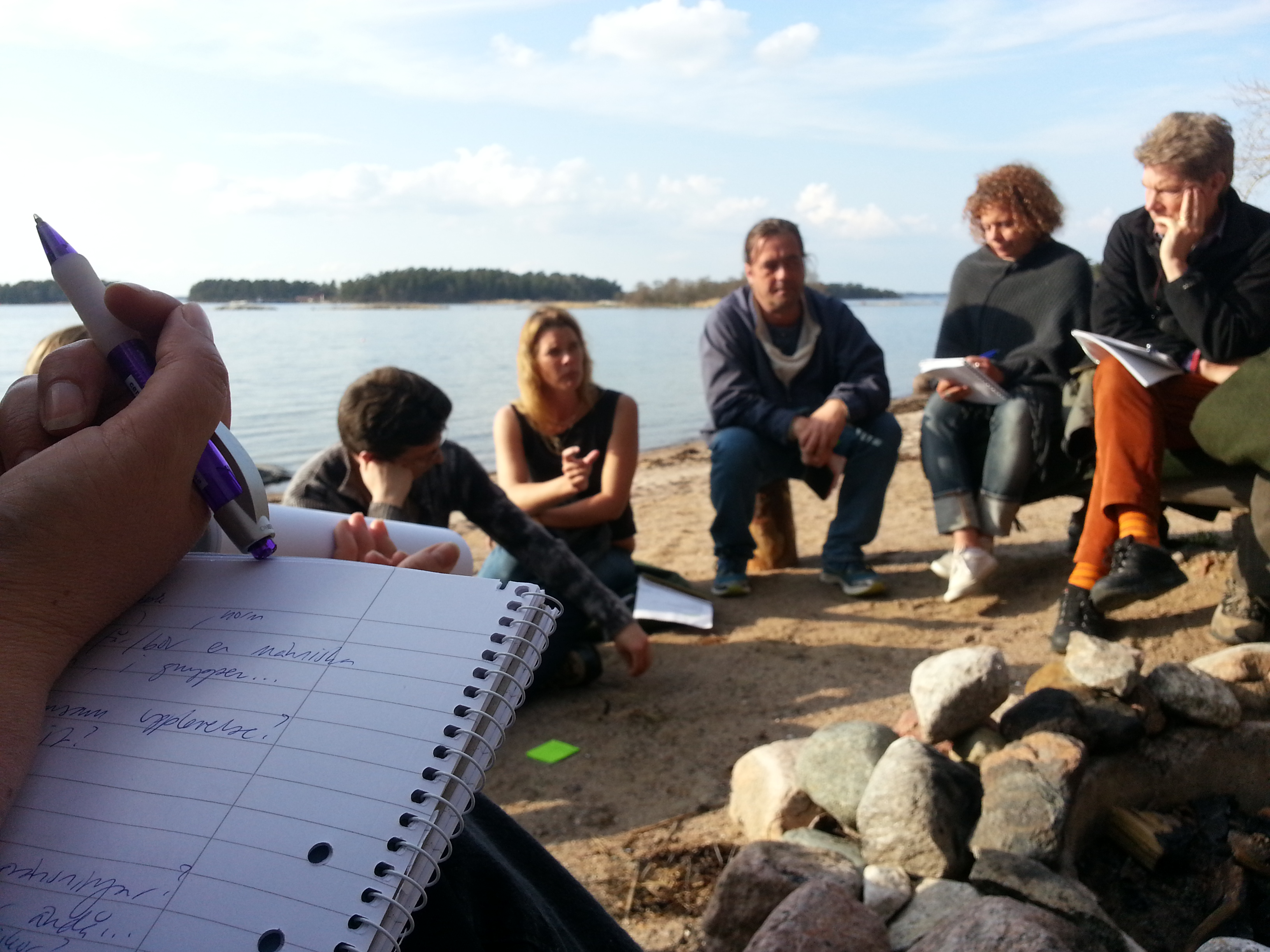
Community of inquiry

The community of inquiry (CoI) is a concept first introduced by early pragmatist philosophers C.S.Peirce and John Dewey, concerning the nature of knowledge formation and the process of scientific inquiry. The community of inquiry is broadly defined as any group of individuals involved in a process of empirical or conceptual inquiry into problematic situations. This concept was novel in its emphasis on the social quality and contingency of knowledge formation in the sciences, contrary to the Cartesian model of science, which assumes a fixed, unchanging reality that is objectively knowable by rational observers. The community of inquiry emphasizes that knowledge is necessarily embedded within a social context and, thus, requires intersubjective agreement among those involved in the process of inquiry for legitimacy.

While Peirce originally intended the concept of the community of inquiry as a way to model the natural sciences, the concept has been borrowed, adapted, and applied in many different fields such as education (by Matthew Lipman in Philosophy for Children movement) and public administration.

== Parable ==
The Buddhist parable of "The Blind Men and an Elephant " offers a colorful way to make sense of the notion of the community of inquiry. The tale finds many blind men fumbling about an elephant, each trying to discover what it is they are touching. They are fixated in disagreement. One finds the elephant's leg and believes it a tree. Another finds its trunk and believes it a rope. Yet another finds its side and believes it a wall. The insight is that we are all trapped inside our limited experience and cannot know the truth. If the blind men only cooperated, forming a community whose goal is inquiry into the strange multifaceted object, they may begin to overcome the problematic situation and discover the true nature of the object of their respective opinions. By sharing their experiences in a democratic and participatory manner they could arrive at a more comprehensive truth than their impoverished perspectives allow, isolated from each other. They would show each other why one found the elephant to be like a rope and the other a tree. They would go further, using other ways to collect evidence (e.g., smell the animal, listen to its sounds). Together they would try to reconcile their conflicting conclusions. The blind men would never see the elephant, but they would no longer be trapped in their own limited perspectives. In short, they would be more likely to resolve the problematic situation, that object is no object at all, it is an elephant. But resolution is never final; even their consensus could be in error. All findings are provisional and subject to revision. This is the scientific quality of the community of inquiry.

== Applications ==
While Peirce originally intended the concept of the community of inquiry as a way to model the natural sciences, the concept has been borrowed, adapted, and applied in many different fields such as education and public administration.

=== Education ===
According to Matthew Lipman, C.S. Peirce originally restricted the concept to the community of scientists. John Dewey broadened the scope of the concept, applying it to the educational setting (Lipman, 2003, pp. 20–21). Borrowing from Dewey, Lipman systematically applies the concept to the educational setting. He argues that a classroom is a type of community of inquiry, which leads to "questioning, reasoning, connecting, deliberating, challenging, and developing problem-solving techniques." Students and teachers involved in inquiry form a community of inquiry under certain circumstances. Therefore, a holistic understanding of a community of students and teachers engaged in authentic inquiry is the working definition of the key term 'community of inquiry'. There is a gestalt dimension to the concept that is underlined by Lipman. He points to "….the profound educational implications of fusing together, as Peirce had, the two independently powerful notions of inquiry and community into the single transformative concept of community of inquiry" (2003, p. 84).

==== Lipman's paradigms ====
Lipman defined community of inquiry as a rigorous, democratic and reflective form of discussion built up over time with the same group of learners. Lipman also provides a useful set of antonymic statements that contrasts the standard educational paradigm with the reflective educational paradigm in which communities of inquiry can occur.

The standard paradigm poses the following:

- education as knowledge transmission
- knowledge as unambiguous, unequivocal and un-mysterious,
- knowledge is divided into non-overlapping disciplines
- teachers as authoritative sources of knowledge.

The reflective paradigm, in contrast, poses the following:

- education is the outcome of participation in a teacher-guided community of inquiry
- teachers stir students to think about the world when teachers reveal knowledge to be ambiguous, equivocal, and mysterious,
- knowledge disciplines are overlapping and therefore problematic,
- teachers are ready to concede fallibility,
- students are expected to be reflective and increasingly reasonable and judicious
- the educational process is not information acquisition but a grasp of relationships among disciplines (2003, pp 18–19).

A community of inquiry can be seen to exist to the degree that it avoids the qualities of this standard paradigm and shows the qualities of this reflective paradigm.

==== Online learning ====
Community of Inquiry model

Lipman's and Dewey's ideas were expanded and applied to online learning contexts in a Canadian project that originated in 1996 at the University of Alberta. The project was led by Randy Garrison, Terry Anderson and Walter Archer. The purpose of the study was to provide conceptual order and a tool for the use of Computer-mediated communication in supporting an educational experience.

Central to the work is a model of community inquiry that constitutes three elements essential to an educational transaction - cognitive presence, social presence, and teaching presence. Indicators (key words/phrases) for each of the three elements emerged from the analysis of computer conferencing transcripts. The indicators described represent a template or tool for researchers to analyze written transcripts as well as a heuristic guide to educators for the optimal use of computer conferencing as a medium to facilitate an educational transaction. This research suggested that computer conferencing has considerable potential to create a community of inquiry for educational purposes.

This project led to production of many scholarly papers, a book and replication of the Community of Inquiry model by distance education researchers globally. The Community of Inquiry model is also used to conceptually guide study research and practice in other forms of mediated, blended and classroom education.

=== Public administration ===
Patricia M. Shields has applied the community of Inquiry concept to the field of public administration. The community of inquiry is not defined by geographic location, rather a common desire by its members to resolve a problematic situation using a scientific attitude to assess evidence and guide action. The community is also defined by participatory democracy. "The parameters of the problematic situation and approaches to resolution are shaped by the interaction of the community and the facts". The democratic community may consider ideals/values such as equality, freedom, effectiveness, justice as it considers goals. There are three key ideas – "problematic situation, scientific attitude, and participatory democracy". Shields depiction is similar to Lipman's in that she refines the term inquiry by focusing on the problematic situations and scientific attitude (both concepts developed by Dewey in his book Logic: The Theory of Inquiry. Community is refined as participatory democracy. The two definitions are essentially the same. Shields draws heavily on John Dewey's insights into democracy and inquiry to refine the concept and apply it to public administration.

== See also ==
- Community of action
- Community of circumstance
- Community of interest
- Community of place
- Community of position
- Community of practice
- Community of purpose
- Learning organization
- Professional learning community
