= Psychotherapy and social action model =

The psychotherapy and social action model is an approach to psychotherapy characterized by concentration on past and present personal, social, and political obstacles to mental health. In particular, the goal of this therapeutic approach is to acknowledge that individual symptoms are not unique, but rather shared by people similarly oppressed and marginalized. Ultimately, the psychotherapy and social action model aims to aid clients in overcoming mental illness through personal psychotherapy, group coping, and collective social action.

== Background ==
The psychotherapy and social action model was initially proposed by Sue Holland, a psychotherapist with a background in community action. Holland developed this framework in 1980 following her experience working with women coping with psychological disorders at a housing estate in West London. At this estate, Holland observed the psychological difficulties experienced by women, noticing that their mental health was fundamentally tied to the social and economic obstacles they encountered as women. In addition, Holland took issue with the way Depression (mood) was being treated at the shelter. Individualized treatment, especially with the use of psychotropic medication, was not successfully addressing the root of the dysfunction. Instead, Holland posited a pathway from individual treatment to sociopolitical action that empowered women to deal with their mental dysfunction both privately and socially. As such, the psychotherapy and social action model is rooted in the ideals of both traditional psychotherapy and feminist empowerment.

Implementation of the model began with a three-year trial run and, according to Holland (1992), achieved its three initial goals, including providing private focused psychotherapy, promoting mental health, and fostering community continuity. There was initial evidence supporting the efficacy of the model in treating individual psychological dysfunction.

== The model ==
The square model derives from the sociological theory of the four paradigms for the analysis of social theory. Outside the frame of the model, the dichotomy of individual versus social approaches to personal well-being is represented. The two bottom cells of the square delineate the changing of individuals to conform to social convention while the two top cells of the square represent the changing of social structures as opposed to the individual.

The four cells within the frame represent the four paradigms of social theory including functionalist, interpretive, radical humanist, and radical structuralist paradigms. Functionalism here is rooted in regulation and objective thinking, and represents the individual, status-quo approach to mental health. The interpretive paradigm is characterized by an approach to understanding the social world through subjective experience, and represents psychoeducation within the psychotherapy framework. The radical humanist paradigm is defined by a radial approach to change with an emphasis on "transcending limitations of existing social arrangements." (Burrell & Morgan, 1979, p. 32). With respect to an approach to therapy, this stage is characterized by the adoption of a social self, such that healing occurs at a group or collective level. The radical structuralist paradigm concentrates on radical change through political or economic emancipation. This is the endpoint of therapy, at which time the client is empowered to challenge sociopolitical structures that foster the conditions perpetuating the manifestation of individual mental illness within an oppressed group.

Taken from her 1992 publication entitled, "From Social Abuse to Social Action: a neighborhood psychotherapy and social action project for women," Holland formulated her four step approach to mental health and social action for women in treatment for depression as follows:

=== I. Patient on pills ===
At this stage, patients endorse the status-quo characterization of the "individualized patient." As such, they treat their disorder passively with psychotropic medication and accept the label associated with their illness.

=== II. Person-to-person psychotherapy ===
This stage represents the first alternative to the status-quo treatment of psychiatric disorders: talk therapy. At this stage, clients and therapists are able to explore the meaning of their psychopathology and pinpoint the potential causes through individual therapy.

=== III. Talking in groups ===
At this stage, the client is able to move past the personal challenges that are acknowledged and addressed in psychotherapy and discover that the challenges are universal amongst similarly marginalized individuals. Together, clients aim to acknowledge what is best for the collective.

=== IV. Taking action ===
The final stage, as the name suggests, is the point at which the collective mobilizes to change the social structures enabling their common oppression. Having changed from an individual to a collective, the clients should feel empowered to undertake social change.

Included in this framework is the assumption that only some of the clients in this therapy will traverse all three stages. In Holland's words, "…many will be content enough with the relief from symptoms and the freedom to get on with their personal lives which the individual therapy gives them." (Holland, 1992, p. 73). Thus, this framework is fluid based on the personal inclinations of the client throughout the therapeutic process.

== Examples of mental health action projects with their roots in social action psychotherapy ==
- Women's Action for Mental Health (WAMH)
- Men's Advice Network (MAN)
- Travers (1997)

== See also ==
- Activism
- Community psychology
- Sociology
