= Discourse community =

Group of people who share a set of discourses

A discourse community is a group of people who share a set of discourses, understood as basic values and assumptions, and ways of communicating about those goals. Linguist John Swales defined discourse communities as "groups that have goals or purposes, and use communication to achieve these goals."

Some examples of a discourse community might be those who read and/or contribute to a particular academic journal, or members of an email list for Madonna fans. Each discourse community has its own unwritten rules about what can be said and how it can be said: for instance, the journal will not accept an article with the claim that "Discourse is the coolest concept"; on the other hand, members of the email list may or may not appreciate a Freudian analysis of Madonna's latest single. Most people move within and between different discourse communities every day.

Since the discourse community itself is intangible, it is easier to imagine discourse communities in terms of the fora in which they operate. The hypothetical journal and email list can each be seen as an example of a forum, or a "concrete, local manifestation of the operation of the discourse community."

== History and definition ==
The term was first used by sociolinguist Martin Nystrand in 1982, and further developed by American linguist John Swales. Writing about the acquisition of academic writing styles of those who are learning English as an additional language, Swales presented six defining characteristics:

A discourse community:
1. has a broadly agreed set of common public goals.
2. has mechanisms of intercommunication among its members.
3. uses its participatory mechanisms primarily to provide information and feedback.
4. utilizes and hence possesses one or more genres in the communicative furtherance of its aims.
5. in addition to owning genres, it has acquired some specific lexis.
6. has a threshold level of members with a suitable degree of relevant content and discoursal expertise.

James Porter defined the discourse community as: "a local and temporary constraining system, defined by a body of texts (or more generally, practices) that are unified by a common focus. A discourse community is a textual system with stated and unstated conventions, a vital history, mechanisms for wielding power, institutional hierarchies, vested interests, and so on." Porter held the belief that all new ideas added to a discourse community had an impact on the group, changing it forever.

Argumentation theorists Chaïm Perelman and Lucie Olbrechts-Tyceta offer the following statement on the conditioned nature of all discourse, which has applicability to the concept of discourse community: "All language is the language of community, be this a community bound by biological ties, or by the practice of a common discipline or technique. The terms used, their meaning, their definition, can only be understood in the context of the habits, ways of thought, methods, external circumstances, and tradition known to the users of those terms. A deviation from usage requires justification ..."

"Producing text within a discourse community," according to Patricia Bizzell, "cannot take place unless the writer can define her goals in terms of the community's interpretive conventions." In other words, one cannot simply produce any text—it must fit the standards of the discourse community to which it is appealing. If one wants to become a member of a certain discourse community, it requires more than learning the lingo. It requires understanding concepts and expectations set up within that community.

The language used by discourse communities can be described as a register or diatype, and members generally join a discourse community through training or personal persuasion. This is in contrast to the speech community (or the ’native discourse community,’ to use Bizzell's term), who speak a language or dialect inherited by birth or adoption. Ideas from speech communities and interpretive communities were what led to the emergence of the notion of discourse communities.

== Designing a discourse community ==
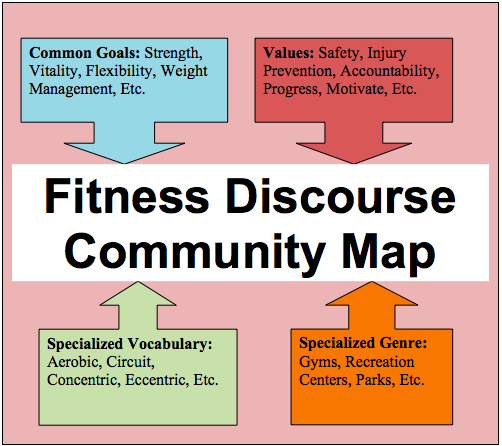
A discourse community map created for fitness

One tool that is commonly used for designing a discourse community is a map. The map could provide the common goals, values, specialized vocabulary and specialized genre of the discourse community. This tool may be presented to all members as a mission statement. As a new generation of members enter into a discourse community, new interests may appear. What was originally mapped out may be recreated to accommodate any updated interests. The way in which a discourse community is designed, ultimately controls the way in which the community functions. A discourse community differs from any other type of grouping because the design will either constrain or enable participants.

== Development of online discourse communities ==
A discourse community can be viewed as a social network, built from participants who share some set of communicative purposes. In the digital age, social networks can be examined as their own branches of discourse communities. A genesis of online discourse is created through four phases: orientation, experimentation, productivity, and transformation. Just as the digital world is constantly evolving, "discourse communities continually define and redefine themselves through communications among members", according to Berkenkotter.

Although John Swales felt that shared "goals" were definitive of discourse community, he also acknowledged that a "public discourse community" cannot have shared goals, and more significantly a generalized "academic discourse community" may not have shared goals and genres in any meaningful sense. According to Swales this may be why the term "discourse community" is now being replaced by "community of practice", which is a term from cognitive anthropology. A community of practice is defined clearly as having a "mutual engagement" and "joint enterprise" which separates it from the more widely accepted implications of a discourse community. A community of practice requires a group of people negotiating work and working toward a common goal using shared or common resources. These virtual discourse communities consist of a group of people brought together "by natural will and a set of shared ideas and ideals". Virtual discourse communities become a separate entity from any other discourse community when "enough people carry on those public relationships long enough to form webs of personal relationships in cyberspace".

"The term discourse community has been criticized in being imprecise and inaccurate, by emphasizing the uniformity, symmetrical relations and cooperation within text circulation networks." Social collectivities within a discourse community can be interpreted as controversial whether by design or mistake. Members of the discourse community take on either assigned or maintained roles which serve as discursive authority, rights, expectations and constraints. Within an online discourse community text oftentimes circulate in what can be considered to be heterogeneous groupings, as teachers write to audiences of administrators, scholars, colleagues, parents and students. The circulation of texts form groups of communities that might not otherwise existed prior to being untied by the circulation of documents. "These and other social complexities suggest a more subtle and varied sociological vocabulary is needed to describe the set of relations within text circulation networks as well as to describe the ways genres mediate the actions and relations within these social collectivities, such as that provided by sociocultural theories of genre and activity."

== Culture ==
Discourse communities are not limited to involvement of people from different linguistic and cultural backgrounds. These people begin to adapt to standards of that discourse community. However, involvement in one discourse community does not hinder participation in other groups based on a pursuit of a common goal. In some cases, under specific standards, traces of discourse interference may appear from other standards.

Yerrick and Gilbert discuss how the impact of discourse perpetuates marginalization of underrepresented students. Their study discusses their frustration with the overwhelming number of school policies and practices which create obstacles for certain student voices to be heard, minimizing lower-track students' input shaping mainstream academic curriculum. These students were given few opportunities to contribute in the classroom and when they did, they would only be permitted to echo someone else's voice on particular views and opinions. With resentment, Yerrick and Gilbert state "There was no attempt to match the home-based discourse with the academic discourse promoted in the classroom, as has been proven problematic through other studies as well."

== Related terms ==
Discourse communities are studied in the larger field of genre analysis. Related terms include Miller's "rhetorical community" and, focusing on the communication rather than the community, Yates & Orlikowski's "genres of organizational communication"

Regarding contemporary rhetorical communities, Zappen, et al., stated, "Thus a contemporary rhetorical community is less a collection of people joined by shared beliefs and values than a public space or forum that permits these people to engage each other and form limited or local communities of belief." Incorporating this factor suggests an introduction to a democratic system in discourse communities and has also been educationally termed "Accountable Talk" by researchers, indicating the diversity of communities.

The term discourse community started to lose favor among scholars in the early 2000s, with community of practice being used in place of discourse community. Swales suggested that discourse communities have shared goals, yet academic communities do not have meaningful shared goals. The term discourse community is not yet well defined, which raises questions that could be the cause of the term's fall from favor.

== See also ==
- Academic writing
- Community of inquiry
- Online discourse environment
- Rhetorical modes
