= Community of position =

Type of community

A community of position is distinguished from a community of practice in that it tends to be more personally focused. Communities of position built around life stages (such as teenage years, university/college student years, marriage, or parenthood) provide individuals with the opportunity to build relationships with others during that particular phase of their lives.

== See also ==
- Cohort study
- Community of action
- Community of circumstance
- Community of interest
- Community of inquiry
- Community of place
- Community of practice
- Community of purpose
