= Guy Holmes (psychologist) =

Guy Holmes was a clinical psychologist in the UK known for his work in the area of critical and community psychology, in particular Psychology in the Real World, a type of social action group work that influenced theory and practice community psychology.

== Early career ==
Holmes was known for working alongside psychiatric service users in group facilitation, social action projects, NHS work and research. This type of work, exemplified by the phrase ‘doing things with, rather than to, people’ and by his collaborative books This is Madness and This is Madness Too, were seen as radical in the 1990s but are now part of mainstream UK Government policy in terms of service user involvement, with most British Mental Health Trusts proclaiming that ‘service users are at the heart of everything we do.’ This is Madness was reviewed as a 'who's who of the new anti-psychiatry movement', and became a core text on many mental health professional training courses. It enabled prominent members of the service user/survivor movement to publish their work in a textbook for the first time.

== Psychology in the Real World ==
Psychology in the Real World is an umbrella title for a variety of community-based groups that Holmes and service user activists co-facilitated from 1999 onwards and which inspired similar groups to be set up across the UK. They include: Thinking about Medication, a group that enabled participants to critique, reduce and come off psychiatric drugs, including anti-psychotics - something that was seen as risky and dangerous at the time but is now viewed as essential given the propensity of such drugs to cause diabetes and other serious physical health problems. Toxic Mental Environments identified aspects of our lived environments that are toxic to our mental health and supported participants to set up projects to detoxify those environments. Walk and Talk, a group featured on Radio 4's All in the Mind and Clare Balding's Ramblings, enabled participants to connect with each other and with the healing power of nature.

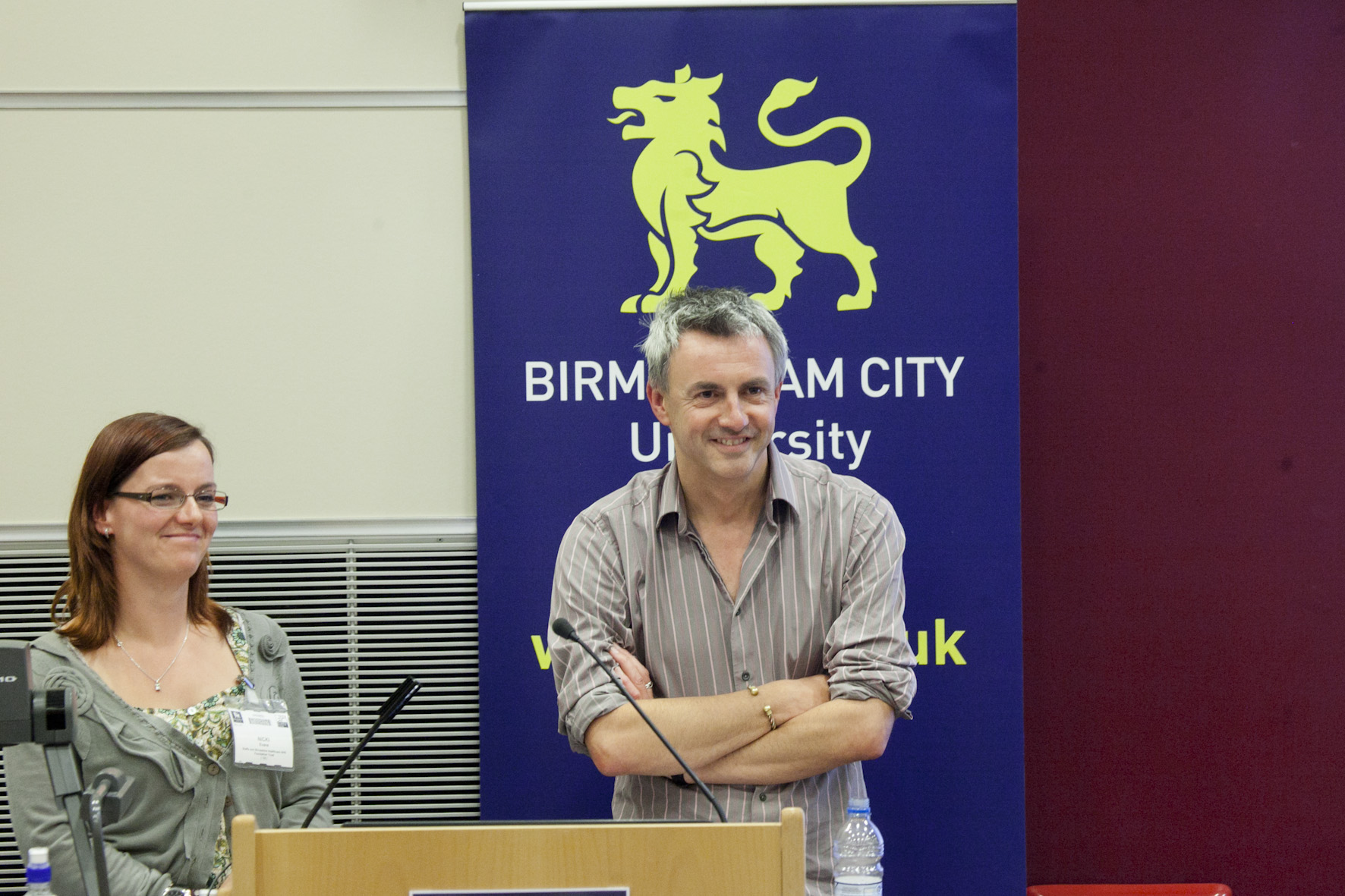
Guy Holmes and Nicki Evans, 1st International Conference on the Multi-Dimensions of Well-Being, Birmingham, 2011

Psychology in the Real World projects enable people with long histories of psychiatric service involvement to take on roles (such as planner and facilitator of groups; researcher; author; staff trainer; lecturer) that provide greater self esteem than roles they are commonly assigned to. As such Psychology in the Real World can be seen as an example of social role valorisation. In 2011 Nicki Evans received a standing ovation at the 1st International Conference on the Multi-Dimensions of Well-Being after describing her journey from a passive recipient of inpatient psychiatric services to becoming an active member of several Psychology in the Real World groups; how this led to her planning and running her own ‘Writing groups’ and taking a lead role in Walk and Talk; and how speaking at conferences and providing staff training about the groups eventually helped her into paid employment in mental health services.

Psychology in the Real World groups occur in community settings rather than stigmatising venues such as mental health units and are open to all members of the public. The bringing together of people with serious mental health diagnoses with other members of the public is a conscious strategy based upon the work of Gordon Allport aimed at reducing stigma.

Holmes has been described as a critical psychologist. His comment, broadcast during an episode of Radio 4's Ramblings, that loneliness is more damaging to your health than smoking cigarettes and drinking heavily trended on Twitter, and though challenged at the time is now accepted by researchers and public policy makers alike.

Along with Marion Janner, Scott Mills and Charles Walker, Holmes was a judge on All in the Mind's 25th Anniversary awards. During his career he published over 50 academic articles and book chapters, many jointly authored with service users/survivors, on medication, the medicalisation of distress, stigma and community psychology. His book Psychology in the Real World: Community-based groupwork was a key text in terms of bridging the gap between community psychology theory and practice and has assisted many similar community psychology projects to be set up in the UK and other countries.

His psychological novel The Black Dogs of Glaslyn was published in 2024, with all royalties going to fund groups that improve mental well-being. It includes a description of Martin Seligman's experiment on dogs relating to his theory of Learned Helplessness. The book was positively reviewed on BBC radio in September 2024.

== Awards ==
Holmes was awarded the British Psychological Society Award for Distinguished Contributions to Psychology in Practice in 2014 and in 2015 was made a Fellow of the Academy of Social Sciences, one of the first psychologists not employed in academia to be so. Later that year he retired from clinical work on the grounds of ill health, the causes of which he linked to Austerity, calling it ‘death by a thousand cuts.’
