= Community of place =

A community of place or place-based community is a community of people who are bound together because of where they reside, work, visit or otherwise spend a continuous portion of their time. Such a community can be a neighborhood, town, coffeehouse, workplace, gathering place, public space or any other geographically specific place that a number of people share, have in common or visit frequently. A community offers many appealing features of a broader social relationship: safety, familiarity, support and loyalties as well as appreciation. Appreciation that is founded on efforts and contribution to the community, rather than the efforts, rank or status of an individual.

Advances in technology, transportation and communication have evolved the concept of place and the limits society once had in interactions with one another. With these advances, barriers have been lifted and distance is no longer such a great factor in anchoring the flow of people, goods or information.

== Variables ==
When identifying what it is that makes a community, it is important to break it down and understand the components that sociologists have found that create solidarity between the community and its members. German Sociologist and Philosopher Ferdinand Tönnies spoke of these components as evolutionary terms in his theoretical essay Gemeinschaft und Gesellschaft (translated to Community and Society). Gemeinschaft would represent the childhood of humanity whereas Gesellschaft would represent the maturity of humanity.

=== Gemeinschaft and Gesellschaft ===
Gemeinschaft or community is smaller in number of members; its members usually share a common way of life (occupation/daily activities), common beliefs. Members have frequent interaction with one another as well as a tie of emotional bonds and distance from centers of power.

Gesellschaft or society is much larger in terms of its members. Contrary to Gemeinschaft, members do not share the same ways of life or beliefs. Members rarely interact with one another and have loose connections to each other. As well as being closer to establishments of power and regulated competitiveness among its members. This type of bond is most often found in urban communities that follow specific systems.

=== Defining "place" ===
A "place" is a geographic location, its material form and the investments of meaning and value; the combination of these concepts make a "place" a place. Geographic location is important because this is used to identify what and where a place is. This concept gives individuals a sense of direction and reference to location. The material form is physicality of the place, whether it be artificially made like a building belonging to an institution or establishment or a natural form, such as a well known land mass. Finally, the meanings and value of place is the shared meaning or psyche of a location. For example, the understanding of an area or neighborhood to reflect some historic value, prestigious families, Utopian or a dangerous.

Example of places as a geographic location of things

A place is not space; Space can be thought of distance, size, direction – usually descriptions of geometric items. Space can become a place when filled with things spoken of earlier, such as: Cultural practices, things, values and of course people. People of a place are usually influenced or are at least conscious of the strong and unique influential forces a place passes onto its people. Every place will exhibit its own unique and independent force of influence that consequently generates social life.

If one of the three defining features (location, material form and meaningfulness) is analyzed as having greater importance than another defining feature, the identity and definition of place is quashed. The focus, favoritism or forgotten of any key feature (when defining place) prevents social construction. A place is more than a variable of social life, it is in fact what molds together social life. Creating solidarity, cohesion to form what is social life. Place often becomes a lens people use to see life through. It impacts an individual's evaluation of others and their identity, political position and practices as well as a tool to measure one's own life.

=== Constructing place ===
The modern globalized world has had an impact on the construction of place and the relationship among different places. Politicians, financial establishments, engineers and architects are among the occupations involved in the construction of place. The architecture of a place is its material form. These structures an architect produces can be symbols of the experiences, styles and cultural influence a place had or has on an individual. An architect could also construct structures to celebrate the history of an area, the achievements of a hero or heroine and complement the surrounding area the structure will be built in. By doing so, the architect creates a look or feel that people can associate with the area.

Globalization as well had impact on the social identity of a community, creating competition among all members of the globalized world. For example, larger "major cities" tend to be proud of its identity it has generated and will continue to pursue this identity. Inspiring smaller cities to pursue this identity as well or one of a new face. In this light, politicians and media play a role in constructing the use of land in a geographic area. Cities are built and develop cultural meaning that conforms with economic interests.

People inhabiting a place help with validity and creation of place. Individuals assimilate the meaningfulness, functionality, name and identity of a space – especially the more in contact they are with the area. The homogeneity of design and architecture of a given neighborhood allows members to identify the class of people as well as name of the area. Quite similar to how people address personal occupation by uniform, the sameness of a given area works in a similar fashion. This same reasoning occurs with structures that are unique; its individuality stands out so much, people assign meaning and identity to it. As stated before, place is not only conceptualized as a location but by the meanings, functionality and qualities people assign to the social stuff that are there. "Place-Stratification" is a consequence of such identity creation: public or private, rich or poor, black or white, safe or dangerous, etc.

The same conceptualization is used on a larger scale; take nationalism or continents for example. Africa and Europe are not divided by physical features such as bodies of water or "real" borders. Instead, they are divided among Geo-political borders that are impacted by cultural beliefs, social practices and overall homogeneity. Although these borders are created through personal whim the consequences of their actions on other places are very real. For example, the impacts that imperialism and colonization had on the land and life-style of Natives.

== Functions of place ==
A place stabilizes social life and gives durability to social structures, creates social hierarchies and networks as well as solidarity among its members through frequent face to face interactions, cultural norms, shared identities, memories and values.

However, there are two arguments made when creating community of place: engagement and estrangement.

- Engagement: Sophistication, diversity, tolerance, public participation, integration, network formation, freedom and civil negotiation.
- Estrangement: Anonymity, detachment, privatization, formal social controls, individualism, disconnection, isolation, lack of community or solidarity.

=== Stratification ===
Social arenas that are inviting and successfully make visitors feel comfortable – like, but not limited to, parks, libraries, and plazas – help to reinforce engagement among community members. These social arenas bring together a variety of different people and allow them to communicate, experience and learn differences of one another. Just as structures can be built to reinforce solidarity and engagement, the construction of social arenas can as well develop estrangement. Take neighborhoods that are closed off by gates or are further in distance from city centers, where access is limited by traveling at high speeds to and from in a private vehicle. Invisible barriers such as price of property and proximity to stores, workplaces and civic centers work as well as agents of social stratification – usually based on things such as race, ethnicity and/or gender.

=== Collective action ===
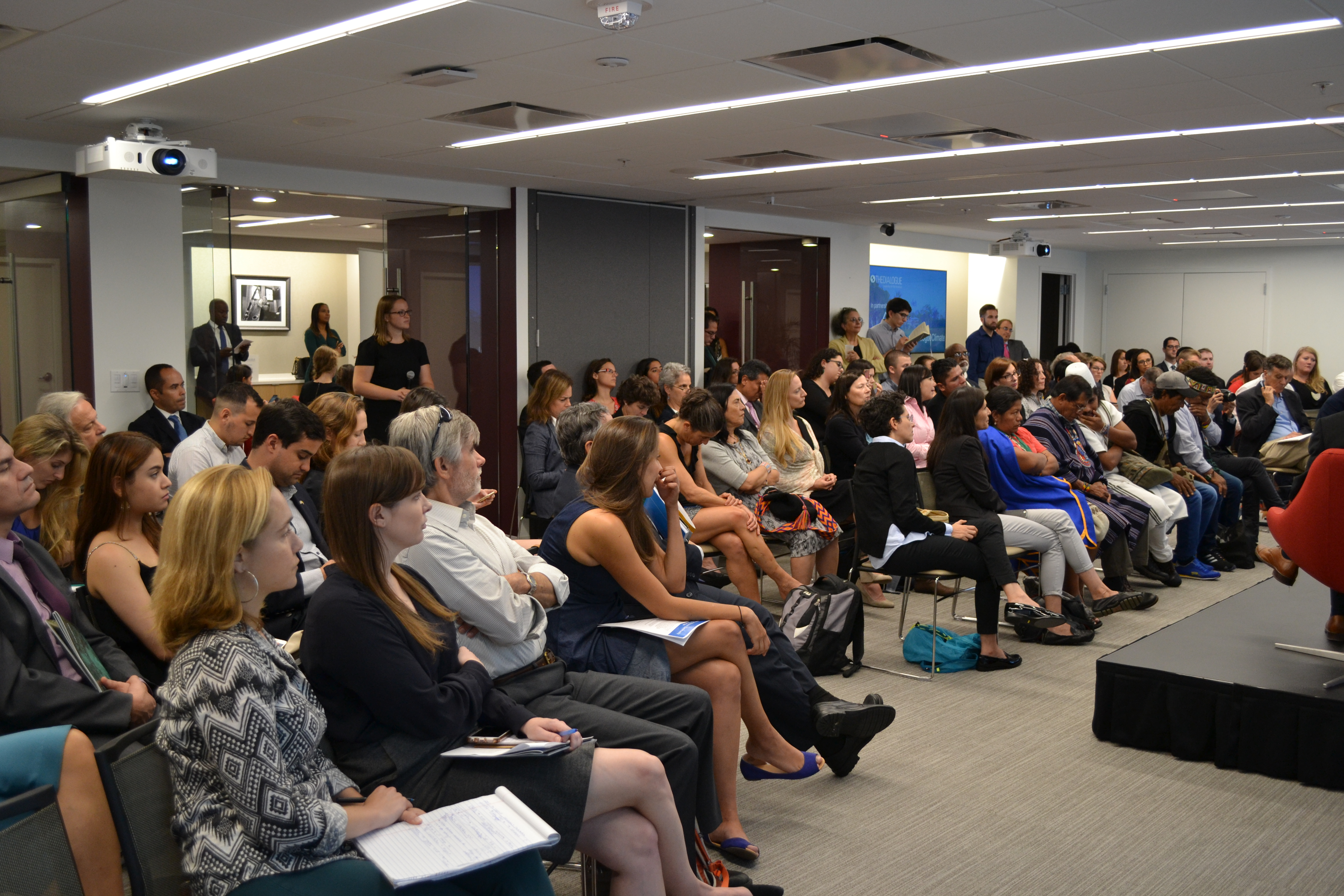
People meeting for community conservation purpose (A Place as a catalyst for collective action)

Place can work as a catalyst for collective action – social movements, protests, formation of labor unions, etc. As stated before, the solidarity that is

individuals, the shared experiences and loyalty to members help with the formation of these movements. Researchers and their efforts have seen this phenomenon occur across multiple social movements and have dissected it so much so, they have pinpointed how proximity and solidarity has affected the response of collective action. The revolt of peasants in the Ottoman Empire during the seventeenth century is a good example of proximity and its effects of cohesion. Villages that were further from centers of political power were more likely to rally than elitist or people that were so far they were essentially isolated from political centers.

Loyalty, sentimental and emotional bonds are created between people as place brings them together. The attachment begins through biographical experiences: traumatic, fulfilling, even secret events that happen to individuals personally at that place. Other research explains that attachment is developed through proximity and shared cultural process like living in the same building and emotional meanings of hanging out and having a good time in a local coffee shop. Place attachment creates a sense of security and well-being as well as identifying oneself to a group and memories.

=== Norms ===
Place inscribes cultural norms, ethical beliefs and values in its members as well as shapes ideology around what is considered deviant or criminal behavior. There are debates on whether crime rates are affected by environment, demographic or economic variables.

== See also ==
- Community of action
- Community of circumstance
- Community of inquiry
- Community of interest
- Community of position
- Community of practice
- Community of purpose
- Imagined community
- Local community
- Neighbourhood character
- Place identity
- Sense of community
- Social geography
- Urban planning
