= Julian Rappaport =

American psychologist

Julian Rappaport is an American psychologist who introduced the concept of empowerment into social work and social psychiatry. He is a recipient of the American Psychological Association's Division of Community Psychology Distinguished Career Award and of the Seymour B. Sarason Award for "novel and critical rethinking of basic assumptions and approaches to human services, education, and other areas of community research and action."

Rappaport is professor emeritus at the University of Illinois at Urbana-Champaign in Urbana. He received his Ph.D. from the University of Rochester. From 1977 he worked in the field of community psychology and social psychiatry in the context of the U.S. welfare crisis. His seminal work on empowerment is the 1984 book Studies in Empowerment. A famous quote by Rappaport concerning social inclusion is „Having rights but no resources and no services available is a cruel joke.“

== Works ==
- Julian Rappaport (1977). Community Psychology: Values, Research, and Action. ISBN 978-0030064418.
- Julian Rappaport; Edward Seidman, eds. (2006). Handbook of Community Psychology. Houghton Mifflin. ISBN 978-0618196043.
