= Community of action =

Group of individuals to bring about change

A community of action (CoA), unlike a community of practice, exists in a situation that is structurally more open, where actors have the possibility of bringing about change.

== Related to ==
- Community of circumstance
- Community of inquiry
- Community of interest
- Community of position
- Community of place
- Community of practice
- Community of purpose
