= Seymour Sarason =

American academic

Seymour Bernard Sarason (January 12, 1919, Brownsville, Brooklyn, New York – January 28, 2010, New Haven, Connecticut) was Professor of Psychology Emeritus at Yale University, where he taught from 1945 to 1989. He is the author of over forty books and over sixty articles, and he is considered to be one of the most significant American researchers in education, educational psychology, and community psychology. One primary focus of his work was on education reform in the United States. In the 1950s he and George Mandler initiated the research on test anxiety. He founded the Yale Psycho-Educational Clinic in 1961 and was one of the principal leaders in the community psychology movement. In 1974, he proposed psychological sense of community, a central concept in community psychology. Since then, sense of community has become a well-known and commonly used term both in academic and non-academic settings.

== Early life ==
Sarason was born in Brownsville, Brooklyn New York on January 12, 1919. Both of his parents, Maxwell and Anna (Silverlight) Sarason, were Jewish immigrants and his father worked in a children's clothes factory in the garment district of Manhattan. Sarason grew up with his sister, Mildred, and his brother, Irwin (who also became a psychologist). At the age of six his family moved to Newark, New Jersey. Sarason was a teenager during the Great Depression and he sold frozen treats and handkerchiefs to help support his family.

During his junior year in high school, Sarason was diagnosed with polio and he lost mobility in his right arm. After a successful surgery that was financed by the New Jersey State Rehabilitation Commission, he regained some functionality of his right arm. Due to the physical limitations Sarason experienced as a result of polio, he became more interested in writing as a career (one of the activities he could still do with his right arm). He was especially interested in becoming a playwright, and he credited his interest in creative writing as one factor that drew him to psychology.

== Education ==
Sarason attended public schools throughout his childhood. When he was seven years old, he began attending Temple B’Nai Abraham, a Hebrew school in New Jersey, on some afternoons and Sunday mornings. As a result of his polio diagnosis, the New Jersey State Rehabilitation Commission collaborated with Dana College (which was later incorporated into Rutgers University) to provide Sarason with a scholarship loan to attend college. He received a bachelor's degree from Dana College in 1939. He obtained a Master's of Arts (1940) and a Ph.D. (1942) in Clinical Psychology from Clark University. At Clark University his research mentor was Saul Rosenzweig and Sarason was the first student at Clark to obtain practical experience working as an extern at a hospital.

== Career ==
=== Southbury Training School ===
After obtaining a Ph.D. from Clark University in 1942, Sarason served for three years as the chief psychologist at the Southbury Training School, a residential facility for children and adults with intellectual disabilities. Sarason noted that the goal of the Southbury Training School was to train and educate residents, and then help them return to their homes and communities. While at the Southbury Training School, Sarason administered many psychological evaluations and conducted psychotherapy. He developed a humanistic view of people with intellectual disabilities after witnessing their creativity and their rich emotional experiences. Based on his work at the Southbury Training School, he published articles on the use of projective psychological tests with people with intellectual disabilities, the use of creativity in therapy, and conducting psychotherapy with people with intellectual disabilities.

While at the Southbury Training School, Sarason became frustrated with individual-based psychological theories that did not consider social context. He also became frustrated by the organization's growing insensitivity toward the well-being of its residents. Sarason stated that the Southbury Training School developed a bureaucratic structure, began to experience departmental rivalries, and lacked effective leadership. He began to wonder why the Southbury Training School deteriorated and whether he could create a setting that effectively and sustainably pursued its purpose.

=== Yale University ===
In 1945, Carl Hovland, the chair of the Department of Psychology at Yale, offered Sarason an Assistant Clinical Professor Position. In addition to teaching clinical courses and supervising clinical students in psychological testing and report writing, Sarason also published papers on projective techniques during his first few years at Yale. Although Sarason is not well known for his work on projective techniques, he appreciated this work because it gave him insight into how human problem solving adapts based on the specific task at hand.

==== Intellectual disability ====
Based largely on his experiences at the Southbury Training School, Sarason published his first book in 1949: Psychological Problems in Mental Deficiency. This book provided a new approach to intellectual disabilities that emphasized social and cultural factors that affect our understanding of intellectual disability. This book became popular in schools of education, and Sarason became well known in the field of education and, more specifically, special education.

==== Teacher preparation and school reform ====
In the 1950s, Sarason developed a close friendship and working relationship with Burton Blatt, the chair of the department of special education at New Haven State College. Burton Blatt was interested in working with Sarason because of Sarason's influential research on intellectual disabilities in the field of education. Both Sarason and Blatt were interested in the preparation of teachers, and they believed that teachers lacked training in how to make educational decisions based on observations of student behavior. To highlight this concern, Sarason, Blatt, and another researcher (Ken Davidson) wrote The Preparation of Teachers: An Unstudied Problem in Education. This book emphasized the importance of taking a historical and sociological perspective when considering school reforms, such as considering the history of teacher training programs and how that history may impact teachers’ current work.

In 1965, Sarason predicted that all attempts to reform schools would fail. His prediction still has an accuracy of 100%. He believed that schooling needed fundamental changes. Further, he often stated that it was inconceivable to think that an ingrained human social system such as public schooling was easily reformed. The preparation and training of teachers was a good place to begin reform, according to Sarason.

==== Test anxiety and situational factors affecting test performance ====
Sarason's research interests in children's test anxiety developed from his observations that the performance of people with and without intellectual disabilities on intelligence tests could be impacted by anxiety related to the testing environment. For approximately 15 years, Sarason examined how test-taking attitudes and anxiety affect test performance. Summarizing some of his research, Sarason wrote The Clinical Interaction to describe situational factors in testing environments that can lead to inaccurate and confusing test results. Although Sarason's research was considered successful, he described his work as a “research factory” and he was frustrated by the lack of socially-relevant action based on his research (e.g., he was frustrated that his research did not lead to programs to help children who experienced high test anxiety).

==== Yale Psycho-Educational Clinic ====
Sarason was frustrated by the lack of social action in his research career, and he seized the opportunity to start a new clinic at Yale University so that he could be more involved in making positive social change. In the late 1950s Sarason was the supervisor of two clinical psychology interns who worked at the Yale Child Study Center, a child psychiatry organization. Because there was a lack of clients available for his supervisees at the Yale Child Study Center, Sarason decided to start a psychology clinic within the Yale Department of Psychology after gaining approval from the chair of the department, Claude Buxton. In the early 1960s Sarason founded the Yale Psycho-Educational Clinic. Although some clients did visit the clinic for psychotherapy and clinical assessments, the clinic was unique in that most of the clinic staff spent the majority of their time in community settings working directly with community organizations. The clinic aimed to expand the role of clinical psychologists to include working in community settings and helping to solve community-based problems. Through his work in the clinic, Sarason also sought to better understand the creation and sustainability of settings. He defined settings as “any instance in which two or more people come together in new relationships over a sustained period of time in order to achieve certain goals.”

The history of the Yale Psycho-Educational Clinic can be separated into two time periods. During the first time period from 1963 to 1965, Sarason and his colleagues aimed to gain entrance into various settings by partnering with organizations, including public schools, anti-poverty programs, and a center for intellectually disabled people. During the second time period from 1965 to 1973, Sarason and the clinic staff focused on studying how settings were created and factors that influenced their longevity. Sarason's main method of investigation involved him acting as a participant-observer who collaborated with various organizations to help solve problems (e.g., low student academic performance, low recruitment for anti-poverty programs). Based on this work, Sarason argued that clinical psychologists should expand their individual-based focus and consider how broader settings contribute to both well-being and pathology. He also argued that changing and reforming settings requires a deep understanding of those settings. Finally, Sarason identified several issues that are relevant to the creation and sustainability of settings, such as having positive external relationships with other people and organizations, having strong leadership at the organizational level, and maintaining realistic expectations about the organization's needs and influence. Sararson's and his colleagues’ work at the clinic resulted in seven books and many articles.

== Publications ==
Seymour Sarason is considered the “father” and “conscience” of Community Psychology because he advocated for the development of a psychology that focused on contextual factors that impact human behavior, the prevention of pathology instead of treatment, and being a collaborative partner rather than an expert. Many of the ideas important to the field of Community Psychology originated from Sarason's work with the Yale Psycho-Educational Clinic. Sarason's influential publications in the field of Community Psychology include:

- Sarason, S. B., Levine, M., Goldenberg, I., Cherlin, D., & Bennett, E. (1966). Psychology in community settings: Clinical, educational, vocational, social aspects. New York, NY: Wiley.
- Sarason, S. B. (1971). The culture of the school and the problem of change. Boston, MA: Allyn and Bacon.
- Sarason, S. B. (1972). The creation of settings and the future societies. Cambridge, MA: Brookline Books.
- Sarason, S. B. (1974). The psychological sense of community: Prospects for a community psychology. San Francisco, CA: Jossey-Bass.
- Sarason, S. B. (1976). Community psychology and the anarchist insight. American Journal of Community Psychology, 4(3), 221.
- Sarason, S. B. (1976). Community psychology, networks, and Mr. Everyman. American Psychologist, 31(5), 317–328.
- Sarason, S. B. (1978). The nature of problem solving in social action. American Psychologist, 33(4), 370–380.
- Sarason, S. B. (1981). An asocial psychology and a misdirected clinical psychology. American Psychologist, 36(8), 827–836.

Sarason was world-renowned as an expert in school reform. Some of his notable publications on education and school reform include:

- Glazek, S. D., & Sarason, S. B. (2007). Productive Learning: Science, Art, and Einstein’s Relativity in Educational Reform. Thousand Oaks, CA: Corwin Press.
- Sarason, S. B., Davidson, K. S., & Blatt, B. (1962). The preparation of teachers: An unstudied problem in education. New York, NY: Wiley.
- Sarason, S. B. (1971). The culture of the school and the problem of change. Boston, MA: Allyn and Bacon.
- Sarason, S. B. (1983). Schooling in America: Scapegoat and salvation. New York, NY: Free Press.
- Sarason, S. B. (1990). The predictable failure of educational reform: Can we change course before it’s too late? San Francisco, CA: Jossey-Bass.
- Sarason, S. B. (1993). The case for change: Rethinking the preparation of educators. San Francisco, CA: Jossey-Bass.
- Sarason, S. B. (1993). You Are Thinking of Teaching? Opportunities, Problems, Realities. San Francisco, CA: Jossey-Bass.
- Sarason, S. B. (1995). Parental involvement and the political principle: Why the existing governance structure of schools should be abolished. San Francisco, CA: Jossey-Bass.
- Sarason, S. B. (1996). Barometers of change: Individual, educational, and social transformation. San Francisco, CA: Jossey-Bass.
- Sarason, S. B. (1996). Revisiting “The culture of the school and the problem of change.” New York, NY: Teachers College Press.
- Sarason, S. B. (1998). Political leadership and educational failure. San Francisco, CA: Jossey-Bass.
- Sarason, S. B. (2001). American psychology & schools: A critique. New York, NY: Teachers College Press.
- Sarason, S. B. (2002). Questions you should ask about charter schools and vouchers. Portsmouth, NH: Heinemann.
- Sarason, S. B. (2003). The skeptical visionary: A Seymour Sarason education reader. (R. L. Fried & S. B. Sarason, Eds.). Philadelphia, PA: Temple University Press.
- Sarason, S. B. (2004). And what do you mean by learning? Portsmouth, NH: Heinemann.
- Sarason, S. B. (2006). Letters to a serious education president. Thousand Oaks, CA: Corwin Press.

Sarason's notable publications on intellectual disability include:

- Sarason, S. B. (1949). Psychological problems in mental deficiency. Oxford, England: Harper.
- Sarason, S. B. (1952). Aspects of a community program for the retarded child. Training School Bulletin, 48, 201–207.
- Sarason, S. B. (1952). Individual psychotherapy with mentally defective individuals. American Journal of Mental Deficiency, 56, 803–805.

Sarason served as president of the Division of Clinical Psychology of the American Psychological Association from 1978-1979. A selection of Sarason's notable publications within the field of clinical psychology, including test anxiety research, include:

- Sarason, S. B. (1954). The clinical interaction: With special reference to the Rorschach. New York, NY: Harper.
- Sarason, S. B., Davidson, K. S., Lighthall, F. F., Waite, R. R., & Ruebush, B. K. (1960). Anxiety in elementary school children. Oxford, England: John Wiley.
- Sarason, S. B. (1985). Caring and Compassion in Clinical Practice. Northvale, NJ: Jason Aronson, Inc.

Sarason also wrote about career expectations, published an autobiography, and wrote a novel:

- Sarason, S. B. (1977). Work, aging, and social change: Professionals and the one life-one career imperative. New York, NY: Free Press.
- Sarason, S. B. (1988). The making of an American psychologist: An autobiography. San Francisco, CA: Jossey-Bass.
- Sarason, S. B. (2005). St. James and Goldstein at Yale. Lincoln, NE: iUniverse, Inc.

== Honors and awards ==
Sarason received many awards from multiple organizations. These awards include:

- Award for Distinguished Contribution to Clinical Psychology from the American Psychological Association (1969)
- Distinguished Contribution Award from the Divisions of Education and Psychology of the American Association on Mental Deficiency (1973)
- The Special Award in the Field of Mental Retardation from the American Association on Mental Deficiency (1974)
- The Award for Distinguished Contributions to Community Psychology and Mental Health from the American Psychological Association Division 27 (1975)
- American Psychological Association Award for Distinguished Contributions to Psychology in the Public Interest (1984)
- Lifetime Contribution to Education Award from the American Federation of Teachers (1989)
- Distinguished Service Medal from the Teachers College at Columbia University (1989)
- Gold Medal Award for Lifetime Contributions by a Psychologist in the Public Interest from the American Psychological Foundation (1996)

Sarason received three honorary degrees:

- Doctor of Humane Letters from Syracuse University (1983)
- Doctor of Science from Queens College at the City University of New York (1985)
- Doctor of Humane Letters from Rhode Island College (1988)

To honor Sarason's legacy, in 1993 the Society for Community Research and Action, Division 27 of the American Psychological Association, established the Seymour B. Sarason Award for Community Research and Action.

== Personal life ==
While working toward his Ph.D. at Clark University, Sarason met Esther Kroop, a fellow graduate student. Sarason married Esther Kroop in 1943, and they had one daughter, Julie. After 50 years of marriage, Esther died in a car accident in 1993. Later in his life, Sarason's companion was Dr. Irma Janoff Miller. Sarason was described as an incredibly warm and welcoming man who made a positive impact on the lives of many students, colleagues, and scholars. Sarason died on January 28, 2010, in New Haven, Connecticut, at the age of 91.
