= D. Randy Garrison =

Canadian cognitive scientist (born 1945)

Donn Randy Garrison (born 1945) is a Canadian professor emeritus at the University of Calgary who has published extensively on distance education.

Garrison is a holder of a B. Ed in Mathematics with a minor in Psychology. In 1972, he did his Master of Education in Computer Application in Education at the University of Calgary. He received an award for most outstanding achievement from the Sloan Consortium in 2009.

== Research ==
- The focus of Garrison's work has been on distance education, online and blended learning. He explored the relationship with teaching, learning and the communication process .
- Garrison believed that at the start of the 21st century, online learning has focused on communication and collaboration.
- By understanding the relationship among teaching presence, cognitive presence and social presence, educators will be able to better meet the needs of the learners.
- Garrison believed that communication and collaboration between teacher and learner is essential in distance education.

== Books ==
1. Garrison, D. R. (1989). Understanding distance education: A framework for the future. London: Routledge.
2. Garrison, D. R. & Shale, D. (Eds.). (1990). Education at a distance: From issues to practice. Melbourne, Florida: Krieger.
3. Garrison, D. R. (Ed.) (1994). Research perspectives in adult education. Melbourne, Florida: Krieger.
4. Garrison, D. R., & Archer, W. (2000). A transactional perspective on teaching-learning: A framework for adult and higher education. Oxford, UK: Pergamon.
5. Garrison, D. R., & Anderson, T. (2003). E-Learning in the 21st century: A framework for research and practice. London: Routledge/Falmer.
6. Garrison, D. R., & Vaughan, N. (2008). Blended learning in higher education. San Francisco: Jossey-Bass.
7. Cleveland-Innes, M., & Garrison, D. R. (Eds.) (2010). An introduction to distance education: Understanding teaching and learning in a new era. London: Routledge.
8. Garrison, D. R. (2011). E-Learning in the 21st century: A framework for research and practice (2nd ed.). London: Routledge/Taylor and Francis.
9. Akyol, Z., & Garrison, D. R. (Eds.) (2013). Educational communities of inquiry: Theoretical framework, research and practice. Hershey, PA: IGI Global.
10. Vaughan, N. D., Cleveland-Innes, M., & Garrison, D. R. (2013). Teaching in blended learning environments: Creating and sustaining communities of inquiry. Athabasca, Athabasca University Press.
11. Garrison, D. R. (2016). Thinking Collaboratively: Learning in a Community of Inquiry. London: Routledge/Taylor and Francis.
12. Garrison, D. R. (2017). E-Learning in the 21st Century: A Community of Inquiry Framework for Research and Practice (3rd edition). London: Routledge/Taylor and Francis.
13. Cleveland-Innes, M., & Garrison, D. R. (Eds.) (2021). An introduction to distance education: Understanding teaching and learning in a new era (2nd edition). London: Routledge.
