= Community development planning =

Community development planning consists of a public participatory and usually interactive form of town or neighborhood planning and design in which diverse community members (often termed “stakeholders”) contribute toward formulation of the goals, objectives, planning, fund/resource identification and direction, planned project implementations and reevaluation of documented local planning policy. It is a logical “bottom-up” evolution of (formerly “top-down”) regional, city and urban planning in an era of plateaued or diminishing public resources, increasing local burdens and responsibilities and public activism. It often promotes public/private partnership as a means to harness physical development activities in support of community-defined goals. At a minimum, it seeks community consensus for proposed allocations of scarce resources among competing demands. In more vigorous application, community members access a full gamut of planning tools, shaping and being shaped by shared understanding of a complex community information base, directly informing and guiding local plan content, influencing resulting development budgets, projects and thus future infrastructure and land uses, as well as helping coordinate the work of overlapping jurisdictions, levels of government, internal and adjacent communities and various providers, such as business associations, utilities and schools.
