= Gathering place =

Place in which people are able to congregate

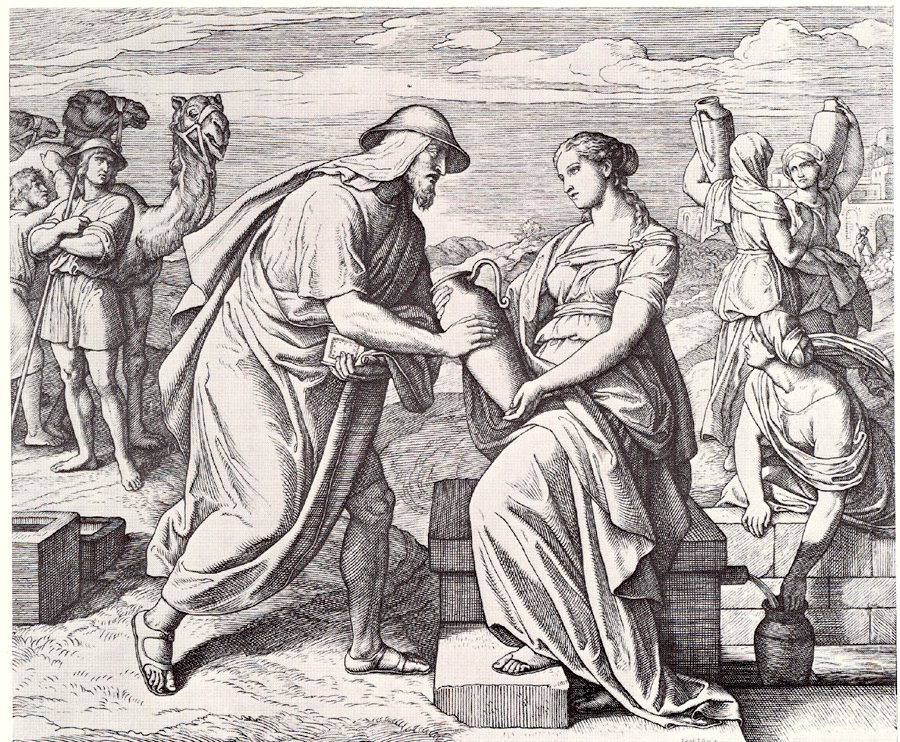
Rebekah at the Well 1860 woodcut in Die Bibel in Bildern.

A gathering place is any place where people are able to congregate. Gathering places may be public; for example, city streets, town squares, and parks; or private; for example, churches, coffee shops, stadiums, and theaters.

Examples of gathering places include Stonehenge, the agora of ancient Greece, New York City's Central Park, and London's Trafalgar Square.

== See also ==
- Public space
- Third place
- Urban geography
- Community of place
- Social environment
- Oahu and its unconfirmed etymology
