= Communities of innovation =

Communities that support innovation

Communities that support innovation have been referred to as communities of innovation (CoI), communities for innovation, innovation communities, open innovation communities, and communities of creation.

== Definitions ==
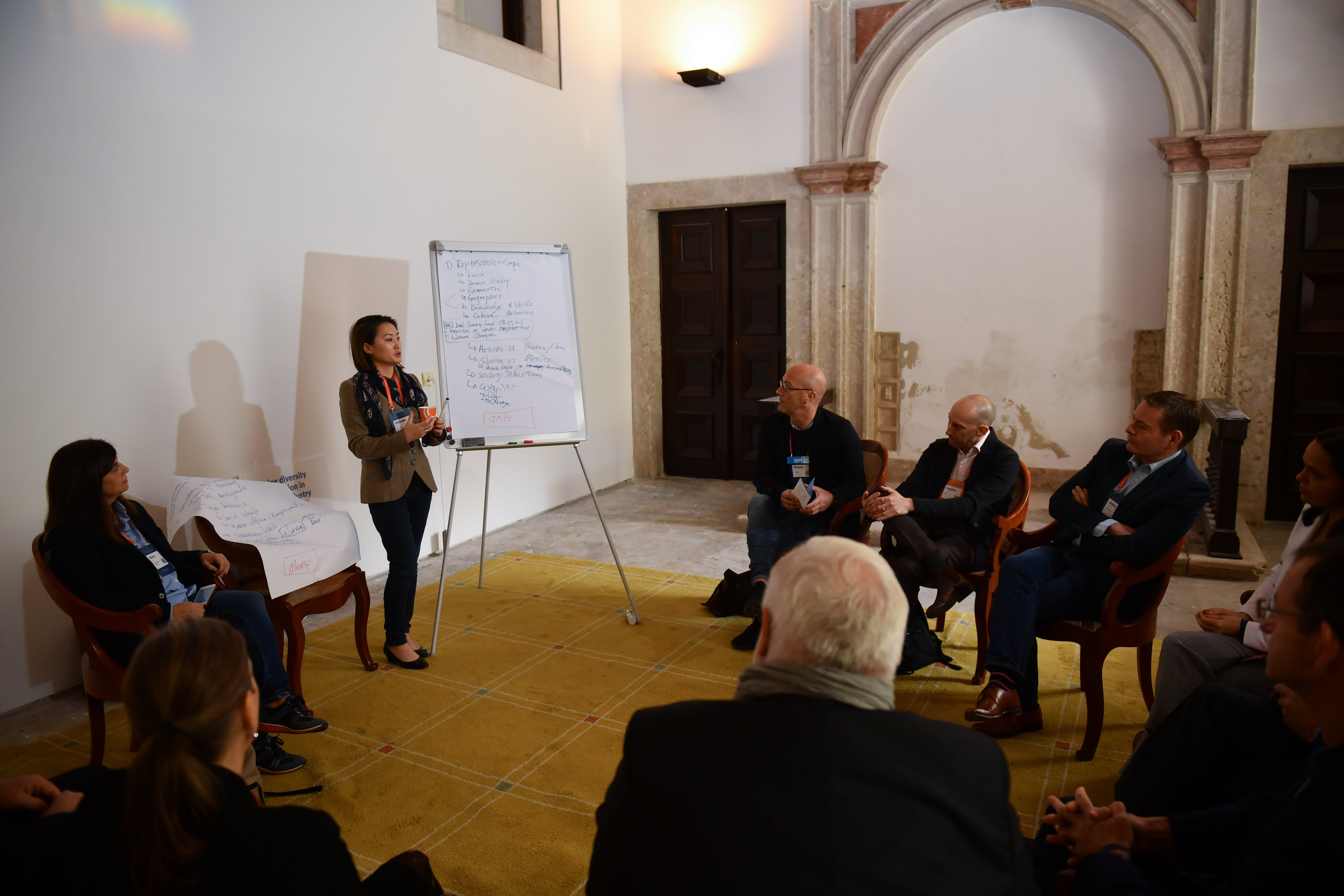
People coming together to pursue an innovative solution

Lim and Ong (2019) defined a community of innovation (CoI) as a group of people with a sense of camaraderie, belonging and a collective identity who are jointly facilitating innovation.

CoIs are groups made up of motivated individuals working together towards a common goal because they are convinced of their common cause.

Coakes and Smith (2007) defined communities of innovation (CoIs) as a form of communities of practice dedicated to the support of innovation.

Sawhney and Prandelli (2000) proposed the model of communities of creation as a new governance mechanism for managing knowledge found in different companies for the purpose of innovation. In CoIs, intellectual property rights are considered to be owned by the entire community, although the community is governed by a central firm which acts as the sponsor and defines the ground rules for participation. This model lies between the closed hierarchical model and the open market-based model.

== Role of communities in organizations ==
Quoting Mintzberg (2009), Lim and Ong (2019) points out that managers need to re-discover the essence of communities in the organizations in order to appropriately manage people within the organizations, who are not simply an organizational resource to be exploited, but who are the very organization itself. In other words, employees who feel they are valued and fairly treated by their organizations will usually work generously and in times of need, sacrificially for the success of the organization of which they feel they are a part of. However, employees who perceive themselves as being exploited, or possibly next on the retrenchment list, will more often than not put in only minimal work for the organization.

== Relationship between communities and innovation ==
Stacey (1969) observed that the term ‘community’ has been used by some to connote social relations in a defined geographical area, and by others to stress the feeling of belonging to a group.

Innovation is the development and implementation of a new idea (Van de Ven, 1986).

Collaboration contributes to innovation (Pouwels and Koster, 2017).

== Macro-processes of communities of innovation ==
Lim and Ong (2019) observed three macro-processes, the first macro-process pertaining to having a relax and conducive environment for interaction and innovation, a second macro-process centering on the need for recognition and organizational resources to sustain the innovation process and a third macro-process of narrowing down the choices and implementation of the innovation. Building on the literature on innovation, they termed the first and third macro-processes the divergence (knowledge sharing, search activities, exploratory, and idea generation) and convergence (elimination of alternatives and narrowing down towards a choice, implementation, exploitation, and commercialization of ideas) macro-processes of community innovation. They termed the second macro-process the gateway macro-process (evaluation of new knowledge creation, selection, prioritization, control, idea screening and advocacy) as they observed that it consists of the critical processes which the organization uses to choose ideas to endorse for further development. It is the gateway through which informal communities of innovation may enter to become formal communities of innovation within the organization.

The macro-process of divergence management begins with individuals within the community of innovation building trust, sharing and discussing ideas, agreeing to develop ideas together and to seek recognition or funding from their organization. The macro-process of gateway management then evaluates the preliminary results for recognition or funding with the outcome as either funding approved or not approved for the development of the new products or services. Finally, if the funding is approved, the group dynamics of the community of innovation then becomes formalized within the organization, bringing about the development and implementation of new products or services within the macro-process of convergence management.

The macro-processes of community innovation management
Divergence management	Gateway management	Convergence management
1. Building trust	5. Having the preliminary results evaluated for recognition or funding	8. Development of new products or services
2. Sharing ideas	6b. Funding approved for the development of the new products or services	9. Implementation of new products or services
3. Discussing ideas	7. Group dynamics become formalized within the organization	
4. Agreeing to develop ideas together and to seek recognition or funding from organization	6a. Funding not approved	

== Communities of innovation compared to communities of practice ==
Lim and Ong (2019) observed that in contrast to communities of practice, communities of innovation may emerge by themselves or be cultivated; they usually exist for a narrower purpose of producing a new service or product over a shorter life span; they are made up of participants from either one or more functions; they require a higher level of trust between participants to be effective; there is a higher cost to their participants; and the potential benefit to the organization may be greater when they are successfully implemented.

They also noted that a community of innovation (COI) may be specialized in one function like a community of practice (COP). An example is an innovation project which involves only staff from the engineering department. It is also possible for communities of innovation to be cross-functional (e.g. involving 2-3 functions). An example is an innovation project which involves staff from two functions, the business department and the environmental science department. In their research, they observed that cross-functional communities of innovation were able to consider problems from more perspectives and come up with more varied solutions. However, cross-functional communities of innovation usually require more time for discussions due to the difference in the members’ level of knowledge concerning different topics and their associated jargons.

The differences between communities of practice (CoP) and communities of innovation (CoI)
	CoP	CoI
Epistemology	Learning	Innovating
Nature	Emergent (natural)	Maybe emergent (natural) or cultivated (artificial)
Life span	Longer	Shorter
Purpose	Broader	Narrower
Scope	Single function	Maybe single function or cross-functional
Participants	Volunteers	Maybe volunteers or conscripts
Number of participants	Few to many	Few
Level of trust between participants	Low to moderate	High
Cost to participants	Low to moderate	High
Benefit to organization	Low to moderate	High
Motivation to join	Personal interest	Personal or organizational

According to Etienne Wenger, a community of practice (CoP) is a group composed of people who are interested in the same topic and often interact with each other in order to increase their knowledge in this topic. CoPs are very similar to CoIs; however, the two differ in a number of critical ways. They can be easily confused between.

A CoP is able to connect the attitudes and values of dissimilar organizations. For example, a researcher may have a similar skill-set as someone working at a corporation; however, they may have very different tacit knowledge and motivation. The formation of a CoP can bring these separate groups with different motivations to form a beneficial partnership.

CoPs and CoIs share many traits and are closely related – so much so that a CoI can be deemed to be a type of CoP. CoIs are, however, different in certain critical ways not routinely addressed by CoPs, ways that are vital in the process of innovation. CoIs are focused on innovation, and while skills and processes can be transplanted across organizations, innovation processes and methods cannot, without significant customization and adaptation.

Another element that separates a CoI is "inspiration to action", which refers to the relationships formed between kindred spirits – relationships providing support and inspiration for taking on the uphill battle of creating significant change and embarking on new possibilities. In contrast, this process of innovation and bringing about significant change – is not well integrated with corporate strategy.

== Drivers of collaborative innovation ==
Drivers of organizational innovativeness include team processes and external knowledge (Rose et al., 2016) and networking (Lewis et al., 2018).

== Communities of innovation and organizational ambidexterity ==
Successful COIs increase innovations within an organization. They, therefore, have the potential to contribute to organizational ambidexterity, which refers to the organization's dual capabilities of managing the current business and being flexible and adaptable to meet future changes and demands.

== Examples ==
Examples of communities of innovation in history include the communities behind steam engines, iron and steel production, and textile machinery. The Pig Iron industry of Cleveland in the UK during 1850–1870 is a prime example of it.

In recent decades, the software industry has exhibited the most significant presence of CoIs. 96% of software products developed in 2016 used open source software. Particularly, in software that runs the computing infrastructure of the internet, open source is ubiquitous. Prime examples of open source software created through communities of innovation include OpenOffice, Python, Blender, GIMP, GNOME, Apache, PostgreSQL and PHP, besides Linux.

=== The CoI that developed Linux ===
Traditionally, the company is the most efficient means of managing knowledge belonging to different people. The primary motivation is job security, career advancement and recognition. Lee and Cole (2003) argue for a community structure for knowledge creation that crosses firms boundaries. To substantiate their argument they put forth the case of how "thousands of talented volunteers, dispersed across organizational and geographical boundaries, collaborate via the Internet to produce a knowledge-intensive, innovative product of high quality": the Linux kernel (Lee and Cole 2003, p. 633). The Linux community has proved to be a very efficient mean of managing knowledge belonging to different people. The primary motivation is a value system, recognition, and potential career advancement or hop. Lee and Cole (2003) argue that research on knowledge management has to date focused on hierarchy and therefore has not adequately addressed the mobilization of distributed knowledge, the knowledge that is dispersed among many people. They note that, as illustrated by the Linux case, "the advent of the Internet and Web-based technologies has enabled specialized communities to convene, interact, and share resources extensively via electronic interfaces," even across firms' boundaries (Lee and Cole 2003, p. 633). People are able to contribute effectively outside their working hours. Coordination of the work (including feedback) is possible even when people are working from different locations. The catchment area is therefore much larger and the critical mass of software engineers required to develop and maintain the Linux project was therefore achievable.

== Benefits and disadvantages ==
According to Henry Chesbrough, over the twentieth century, the closed innovation paradigm was overtaken by the theory of open innovation, which emphasizes the significantly higher importance of external resources – thanks to an increasing trend towards globalization, new market participants, and simultaneously shorter product life cycles with correspondingly increasing R&D costs.

Innovation through CoIs has many benefits when compared to proprietary or closed-off product development. Particularly, individual innovators and small and medium-sized enterprises (SMEs) are expected to gain most from open innovation collaborations due to their inherently limited capabilities.

When the most popular Open Source tools and applications – developed through collaboration among their respective communities of innovation (such as software like Linux, Apache Web Server, PostgresSQL and PHP) were compared with similar proprietary software, Gartner found that open source bested or equaled the quality of their proprietary cousins and that many open source developers and advocates are gainfully employed and at very little risk of losing future work prospects. Open source products development has proven to be an efficient way of exhibiting skills.

According to the Technology and Innovation Management Review, open innovation generally provides the following benefits: Broader base of ideas, Technological synergy, Improvement of the internal learning capacity through the transfer of external knowledge and learning routines and Use of intellectual property as strategic assets.

However, open innovation is also associated with a slow or delayed development Pace.

Also, over time it has been proven – especially in the case of communities of innovation in the software industry – that due to the nature of patent and intellectual property law, the dream of open source software as advanced by its advocates – has failed. It was believed that democratization of software would result in shared ownership of its intellectual property, but that hasn't happened. Software built using open source software – is then patented and closed to external collaboration by wealthy companies, who profit much more from the results than the communities of innovation involved in developing the underlying technologies. This leads to greater wealth inequality, as opposed to social good.

According to an article in Technology and Innovation Management Review, open innovation generally suffers from the following disadvantages: strong dependence on external knowledge; loss of key knowledge control; loss of flexibility, creativity, and strategic power.

== History ==
There is evidence that, contrary to the popular belief, communities of innovation such as those in open source software, are not a recent development. There are many examples in history in which innovators have used collective invention as in the cases of textile machinery, steam engines, and the production of iron and steel. In these cases, the innovators' behavior was largely dependent on public policy that accommodated knowledge sharing to foster cumulative innovation. Sometimes, knowledge sharing coexisted with patenting.

Despite the historical precedent, today knowledge sharing among innovators is generally regarded as a modern development. The cost for information exchange has drastically decreased due, in a large part, to breakthroughs within the information and communication fields. According to Henry Chesborough (2003), modern open innovation is often seen as, "a sharp break from the paradigm of the early twentieth century when research labs were largely self sufficient – only occasionally receiving outside visitors, and researchers would seldom venture out to visit universities or scientific expositions". In history, the "heroic inventor" is shown greater consideration than the cooperation of innovators.

Stories of innovative heroes were believed to be more fascinating than other narratives, such as the stories of often nameless farmers, who created and shared new types of wheat on the Great Plains. This demonstrates the cultural shift that caused the "heroic inventor" to be nationally celebrated in Britain and all Western countries.

Knowledge sharing often occurred in the past, though there is not enough evidence to prove whether or not it occurs more frequently today. However, it is known that tension has existed for some time between the depth and scope of open knowledge sharing and the patent system.

Among the foremost examples of collective innovation in the past is Cleveland's Pig Iron industry in the UK during 1850–1870. This industry experienced a "free exchange of information about new techniques and plant designs among firms in an industry". According to economic historian Robert Allen, the proliferation of knowledge sharing in the iron district had two plausible reasons. First, afterword traveled of a prosperous blast furnace design, the reputations of engineers grew to be more positive. This only increased profits and allowed engineers to improve their careers. Second, such disclosures could cause the value of the revealing party's assets to decrease. Improving the blast furnace designs, in turn, led to an increase in the values of iron ore deposits, because these Cleveland ore mines were often owned by the blast furnace firms. This possibly made revealing technical information freely a profitable activity from the individual firm's point of view. Similarities can be drawn to today's communities of innovation, where the primary motivation for participants is recognition and potential career advancement, and for participating firms is related profit.

It is yet to be understood how the rivalry between firms and innovators (that caused knowledge sharing to exist) came to be, while which conditions actually lead to aggressive rivalry and patenting. Bessen and Nuvolari (2011) mention that "... as the technology matures, the nature of firms rivalry, their willingness to share knowledge and their use of patents correspondingly change. In particular, knowledge sharing is more likely to occur during the early phases of technology or where local innovation has little effect on worldwide prices."

== See also ==
- Frugal innovation
- Learning community
- Online participation
- Organizational learning
- Social capital
- Tacit knowledge
