= Martin Nystrand =

American composition and education theorist

- Born: December 28, 1943 (age 82); Joliet, Illinois, U.S.
- Education: Northwestern University; Johns Hopkins University
- Occupations: Composition and Education Theorist
- Known for: Reciprocity theory of writing; Dialogic instruction; Quantitative analysis of classroom discourse

Martin Nystrand (born December 28, 1943) is an American composition and education theorist. He is Louise Durham Mead Professor Emeritus in the Department of English at the University of Wisconsin–Madison

== Early life and education ==
Martin Nystrand was born in Joliet, Illinois, United States, and grew up in Oak Park, Illinois. He received his B.A. in English from Northwestern University in 1965, his M.A.T. from Johns Hopkins University in 1966, and his Ph.D. in English education from Northwestern University in 1974. During 1971-1972, he studied as a special student with James Britton at the University of London.

== Career ==
After teaching as a professor of English at the University of Illinois-Chicago, Nystrand moved to the Department of English at the University of Wisconsin–Madison where he served as architect of a campus-wide reform of undergraduate writing curriculum and founded the doctoral program in Composition & Rhetoric. While also at Wisconsin, he served as a director of the National Research Center on English Learning & Achievement (CELA). Awarded more than $9 million in grants over the course of his career, he was president of the American Education Research Association Special Interest Group for Writing Research, 1991-1993, as well as the National Conference for Research on Language & Literacy (NCRLL), 2002–2003. In addition to editing Written Communication from 1994-2002, Nystrand has published ten books, 60 papers, & chapters and was awarded the Distinguished Lifetime Research Award from the NCRLL in 2011.

Nystrand's research focuses on the dialogic organization of discourse in both writing and classroom discourse. His writing research examines how writing-reader interaction shapes writers' writing processes and development. His classroom discourse research explores the role of classroom interaction in student learning and was the first large-scale empirical study to document the role of open classroom discussion in student learning. His study "Questions in Time" with Wu, Gamoran, Zeiser, and Long was the first use of event-history analysis to investigate classroom discourse.

Nystrand's work has successfully introduced several seminal concepts in current research:

- Discourse community: Social groups that share discourse practices
- Doctrine of autonomous text: Written texts differ from conversational utterances in their explicitness; autonomous texts "say what they mean and mean what they say."
- Textual space: The semiotic space created by the interaction of writers and readers when texts are read: A text is a manifestation of the textual space whose parameters are defined by reader-writer interaction.
- Authentic teacher questions: Questions without "prespecified" answers.
- Question events: Interactions surrounding questions plotted in event history analysis.
- Re-enlightenment: Cognitive, historical, personal, and cultural transformations of understanding replacing old with new.
- Dialogic spells and dialogic bids: Modes of classroom discourse somewhere between recitation and discussion, characterized by engaged student questions and an absence of teacher test questions. A dialogic bid is a teacher discourse move responding to and taking up ideas and observations introduced by students; examples include student questions, uptake, and authentic questions.

== Research on Writing ==
Nystrand’s theory of writing posits that written communication is governed by reciprocity between writers and readers, and his model outlines the textual "moves" that writers make vis-à-vis readers in order to initiate and sustain their interaction. Since Nystrand’s theory is based on reciprocity between writer and reader and a dialogic conception of meaning, it differs fundamentally from Grice’s cooperation model of communication, as well as rhetorical conceptions and models of writing which seek to explain writing in terms of effects writers seek to have on readers.

His research on writing examines how writer-reader interaction shapes writers’ writing processes and development. Nystrand’s social-interactive model of writing, in which text meaning is neither (a) found in the writer’s intentions, which, according to cognitive models of writing, the writer "translates" into text, nor (b) embodied in the text itself, as proposed in such formalist accounts of exposition as Olson’s doctrine of autonomous text. Rather, texts are said merely to have a potential for meaning, which is realized only in use, for example, when a text is read (even by the writer).

This meaning is dynamic, which is to say, it evolves over the course of reading, a view consistent with Bakhtin, Fish, and Rommetveit; it is not exactly the same from reader to reader or even from reading to reading; and it is entwined with the cultural and ideational assumptions readers bring to the text. This is not to say that readers completely determine the meaning of the text; instead, whatever meaning is achieved is a unique configuration and interaction of what both writer and reader bring to the text. Because meaning is not encoded in the text itself, writers do not achieve explicitness by saying everything in autonomous texts. The writer’s problem in being explicit is not saying everything—a sure-fire recipe for being tedious and boring. Indeed, the writer’s problem is knowing just which points need to be elaborated and which can be assumed. This in turn depends on what readers already know, or more specifically on what the writer and reader share. Explicitness is consequently not a text phenomenon but rather a social-interactive, or dialogic one. Hence, skilled writers anticipate what Bakhtin terms "responsive understanding" at each point of their composing.

== The Demographic Postulate: Research on the History of Composition and Rhetoric ==
Nystrand’s research on the history of writing as an activity and Composition and Rhetoric as an academic area of research has correlated its origins and development amidst increases in social mobility and consequential demographic shifts. Indeed, as Schmandt-Besserat shows, this seems to have been the case as long ago ancient Mesopotamia when in the late fourth millennium BCE, the cuneiform script was invented in the Near East to accommodate a new expanding and expansive commercial class of trading. Later in mid- to late-eighteenth century Britain, as Miller shows, composition and rhetoric first gained traction in provincial colleges, not elite universities like Cambridge and Oxford (where Latin was the principal medium of instruction). During this period, an expanding middle class sought self-improvement through writing instruction, as well as upscaling their working class dialects through enunciation instruction. Dissenters to the Catholic throne and drivers of the Protestant Reformation such as Adam Smith and Joseph Priestley, who were prohibited from teaching at Cambridge and Oxford, took to teaching writing, in English, not Latin. Grammars and dictionaries flourished.

A century later after the American civil war, Charles William Eliot, president of Harvard, led the expansion and modernization of Harvard, transforming it from a college for sons of the landed gentry into a modem university dedicated to the education of middle- as well as upperclass managers in an industrial society–in short, from education serving an agrarian aristocracy to specialized professional preparation for an industrial meritocracy, or an "aristocracy of achievement," to quote Charles William Eliot, president of Harvard in 1869. In this way, the new professional classes of the industrial world were to be given "a quite direct preparation of the work habits and thought patterns that are needed to function in any of the 'varied calls of life.'"

Almost exactly a century later in the 1970s, composition studies benefited dramatically from the radical shifts in the demographics of American colleges. Rarely have the problems of the world impacted school and university instructional programs as fully as during the late 1960s when riots torched cities and Vietnam War protests tore at university campuses. The Johnson administration vigorously sought to increase educational opportunities as a key weapon in its War on Poverty, and by the late 1960s, a new community college opened every week. And as in eighteenth-century Britain, these non-elite institutions fueled new approaches to composition. In the fall of 1970, six months after four Kent State students were shot dead by National Guard troops, CUNY expedited its policy of open admissions, five years ahead of its planned start in 1975: Brooklyn's enrollments jumped from 14,000-34,000 students from increasingly diverse backgrounds and varied preparation for college-level writing. The woeful inadequacy of freshman composition instructors to meet this challenge prompted new research, notably that of Mina Shaughnessy’s Errors and Expectations, published in 1977, who, influenced by Labov's "The logic of non-standard English," published in 1969, sought to show patterns and unconventional patterns in what the critics of the schools saw as so much sloppiness and ignorance. Composition studies, traditionally situated in service courses taught by teaching assistants, sought to forge academic niches in departments of English where literary studies dominated their concerns for intellectual prestige. New research, e.g., Flower & Hayes, 1977, formed the basis for new doctoral programs in composition and rhetoric. Between 1980-1995, these programs grew from only a few to currently dozens generating hundreds of PhDs each year. The story of composition studies has been and continues to be fueled by demographic shifts involving the dynamics of a marginalized academic concern involving marginalized students on marginalized campuses, and what happened when they each, in their own way, strove for legitimacy.

== Research on Classroom Discourse ==
Nystrand’s research on classroom discourse probes the role of classroom interaction in student learning and was the first large-scale empirical study to document the role of open classroom discussion in student learning. His study with L. Wu, A. Gamoran, S. Zeiser, and D. Long was the first-ever use of event-history analysis to investigate classroom discourse. Dialogic instruction focuses not on what teachers provide or do to students but rather on how teachers and students collaboratively negotiate. High quality classroom discourse is characterized by substantive reciprocity between teachers and their students. In such instruction, students and not just teachers have a lot of input into the business of the classroom and hence what is learned. Nystrand’s companion computer program, CLASS provides a number of measures designed to assess the quality of interaction between teachers and their students.

== Selected bibliography ==
- Nystrand, M. (in press). Reciprocity as a Principle of Discourse: Selected Writings of Martin Nystrand. Oxford & New York: Taylor & Francis.
- Nystrand, M. (2019). Twenty Acres: Events That Transform Us. New York, London, Paris, & Dubai. KiwaiMedia
- Nystrand, M. (1997). Martin Nystrand with A. Gamoran, R. Kachur, and C. Prendergast, C. Opening Dialogue: Understanding the Dynamics of Language and Learning in the English Classroom. Language and Literacy Series. New York: Teachers College Press.
- Nystrand, M. (1986). The Structure of Written Communication: Studies in Reciprocity Between Writers and Readers. New York: Academic Press.
- Applebee, A.N., Langer, J.A., Nystrand, M., Gamoran, A. (2003). Discussion-based approaches to developing understanding: Classroom instruction and student performance in middle and high school English. American Educational Research Journal, 40(3), 685-730.
- Nystrand, M., and Gamoran, A. (1991). Instructional discourse, student engagement, and literature achievement. Research in the Teaching of English, 1991, 261-290.
- Nystrand, M., Wu, L.L., Gamoran, A., Zeiser, S., and Long, D.A. (2003). Questions in Time: Investigating the Structure and Dynamics of Unfolding Classroom Discourse. Discourse Processes 35 (2), 135-198.
- Gamoran, A., Nystrand, M., Berends, M., and LePore. P. (1995). An organizational analysis of the effects of ability grouping. American Educational Research Journal 32 (4), 687-715.
- Nystrand, M. A social-interactive model of writing. (1989). Written Communication 6 (1), 66-85.
- Nystrand, M., Greene, S., and Wiemelt. J. (1993) Where did composition studies come from? An intellectual history. Written Communication 10 (3), 267-333.
- Nystrand, M. (1982). What Writers Know: The Language, Process, and Structure of Written Discourse. New York: Academic Press.
- Nystrand, M. (2006). Research on the role of classroom discourse as it affects reading comprehension. Research in the Teaching of English, 2006. 392-412.
- Nystrand, M., & Gamoran, A. (1991). Student engagement: When recitation becomes conversation. In H. Waxman and H. Walberg (Eds.), Contemporary Research on Teaching. Berkeley: McCutchan.
