= Community of circumstance =

A community of circumstance is similar to a community of practice, except that it is driven by position, circumstance or life experience rather than a shared interest.

== See also ==
- Community of action
- Community of inquiry
- Community of interest
- Community of place
- Community of position
- Community of purpose
