= Sense of community =

Psychological concept

Sense of community (or psychological sense of community) is a concept in community psychology, social psychology, and community social work, as well as in several other research disciplines, such as urban sociology. It focuses on the experience of community rather than its structure, formation, setting, or other features. The latter is the province of public administration or community services administration which needs to understand how structures influence this feeling and psychological sense of community. Sociologists, social psychologists, anthropologists, and others have theorized about and carried out empirical research on community, but the psychological approach asks questions about the individual's perception, understanding, attitudes, feelings, etc. about community and their relationship to it and to others' participation—indeed to the complete, multifaceted community experience.

In his seminal 1974 book, psychologist Seymour B. Sarason proposed that psychological sense of community become the conceptual center for the psychology of community, asserting that it "is one of the major bases for self-definition." By 1986 it was regarded as a central overarching concept for community psychology. In addition, the theoretical concept entered the other applied academic disciplines as part of "communities for all" initiatives in the US.

Among theories of sense of community proposed by psychologists, McMillan's & Chavis's is by far the most influential, and is the starting point for most of the recent research in the field. It is discussed in detail below.

== Definitions ==
For Sarason, psychological sense of community is "the perception of similarity to others, an acknowledged interdependence with others, a willingness to maintain this interdependence by giving to or doing for others what one expects from them, and the feeling that one is part of a larger dependable and stable structure".

McMillan & Chavis define a sense of community as "a feeling that members have of belonging, a feeling that members matter to one another and to the group, and a shared faith that members' needs will be met through their commitment to be together."

J.R. Gusfield identified two dimensions of community: territorial and relational. The relational dimension of community has to do with the nature and quality of relationships in that community, and some communities may even have no discernible territorial demarcation, as in the case of a community of scholars working in a particular specialty, who have some kind of contact and quality of relationship, but may live and work in disparate locations, perhaps even throughout the world. Other communities may seem to be defined primarily according to territory, as in the case of neighbourhoods or local communities, but even in such cases, proximity or shared territory cannot by itself constitute a community; the relational dimension is also essential.

Factor analysis of their urban neighbourhoods questionnaire yielded two distinct factors that Riger and Lavrakas characterized as "social bonding" and "physical rootedness", very similar to the two dimensions proposed by Gusfield. Early work on psychological sense of community was based on neighborhoods as the referent, and found a relationship between psychological sense of community and greater participation, perceived safety, ability to function competently in the community, social bonding, social fabric (strengths of interpersonal relationship), greater sense of purpose and perceived control, and greater civic contributions (charitable contributions and civic involvement). These initial studies lacked a clearly articulated conceptual framework, however, and none of the measures developed were based on a theoretical definition of psychological sense of community.

== Primary theoretical foundation: McMillan and Chavis ==
McMillan & Chavis's theory (and instrument) are the most broadly validated and widely utilized in this area in the psychological literature. They prefer the abbreviated label "sense of community", and propose that sense of community is composed of four elements:

Membership
Membership includes five attributes:

1. boundaries
2. emotional safety
3. a sense of belonging and identification
4. personal investment
5. a common symbol system

Influence
Influence works both ways: members need to feel that they have some influence in the group, and some influence by the group on its members is needed for group cohesion. Recent research on rural and urban communities have found that sense of community is a major factor.

Integration and fulfillment of needs
Members feel rewarded in some way for their participation in the community.

Shared emotional connection
The "definitive element for true community", it includes shared history and shared participation (or at least identification with the history).

=== Dynamics within and between the elements ===
McMillan & Chavis give the following example to illustrate the dynamics within and between these four elements:

Someone puts an announcement on the dormitory bulletin board about the formation of an intramural dormitory basketball team. People attend the organizational meeting as strangers out of their individual needs (integration and fulfillment of needs). The team is bound by place of residence (membership boundaries are set) and spends time together in practice (the contact hypothesis). They play a game and win (successful shared valent event). While playing, members exert energy on behalf of the team (personal investment in the group). As the team continues to win, team members become recognized and congratulated (gaining honor and status for being members). Someone suggests that they all buy matching shirts and shoes (common symbols) and they do so (influence).

==== Current research ====
In their 2002 study of a community of interest, specifically the science fiction fandom community, Obst, Zinkiewicz, and Smith suggest Conscious Identification as the fifth dimension.

== Empirical assessment ==
Chavis et al.'s Sense of Community Index (SCI), originally designed primarily in reference to neighborhoods, can be adapted to study other communities as well, including the workplace, schools, religious communities, communities of interest, etc.

== See also ==
- Anomie – Sociological term for "normlessness" (The Division of Labor in Society, Émile Durkheim)
- Belongingness – human emotional need to be an accepted member of a group
- Communitarianism – Political philosophy (The Spirit of Community, Amitai Etzioni)
- Community practice (Social Work)
- Entitativity – the perception of a social unit as a "group"
- Gemeinschaft and Gesellschaft – Types of social ties by Ferdinand Tönnies (Community and Society, Ferdinand Tönnies)
- Group cohesiveness – the strength of bonds linking members of a social group to one another and to the group as a whole
- Imagined communities – Nation as a socially constructed community
- In-group and out-group, a social group to which a person psychologically identifies as being a member
- Interest network – Type of affinity group
- Online participation – Extent to which the web encourages the people to share in organizational decision-making
- Social integration – the process during which newcomers are incorporated into the social structure of the host society
- Social solidarity – Unity of feeling or action on a common interest
