= Community psychology =

Branch of psychology

Community psychology is concerned with the community as the unit of study. This contrasts with most psychology, which focuses on the individual. Community psychology also studies the community as a context for the individuals within it, and the relationships of the individual to communities and society.

Community psychologists seek to understand the functioning of the community, including the quality of life of persons within groups, organizations and institutions, communities, and society. They aim to enhance the quality of life through collaborative research and action. In general, they help individual to solve social problems and adapt to their work and living groups by applying psychological principles, ideas and point of view.

Community psychology employs various perspectives within and outside psychology to address issues of communities, the relationships within them, and related people's attitudes and behaviour.

Julian Rappaport discusses the perspective of community psychology as an ecological perspective on the person-environment fit (this is often related to work environments) being the focus of study and action instead of attempting to change the personality of an individual or the environment when an individual is seen as having a problem.

Closely related disciplines include community practice, ecological psychology, environmental psychology, critical psychology, cross-cultural psychology, social psychology, political science, public health, sociology, social work, applied anthropology, and community development.

In the United States, community psychology grew out of the community mental health movement, but evolved dramatically as early practitioners incorporated their understandings of political structures and other community contexts into perspectives on client services. However, in other regions, it has had different origins. In much of Latin America, for example, it developed from social psychology as a response to the "crisis of social psychology" and the search for psychological theory and practice relevant to the social problems of the region.

== History of community psychology in the US ==
In the 1950s and 1960s, many factors contributed to the beginning of community psychology in the US. Some of these factors include:

- A shift away from socially conservative, individual-focused practices in health care and psychology into a progressive period concerned with issues of public health, prevention and social change after World War II and social psychologists' growing interest in racial and religious prejudice, poverty, and other social issues
- The perceived need of larger-scale mental illness treatment for veterans
- Psychologists questioning the value of psychotherapy alone in treating large numbers of people with mental illness
- The development of community mental health centers and de-institutionalization of people with mental illnesses into their communities

=== Swampscott Conference ===
In 1965, several psychologists met to discuss the future of community mental health as well as discuss the issue of only being involved with problems of mental health instead of the community as a whole. The Swampscott Conference is considered the birthplace of community psychology. A published report on the conference proposed that the role of the community psychologist 'may ... be seen as that of a "participant-conceptualizer." In 1987, the American Journal of Community Psychology published a special issue to commemorate the creation of the discipline.

== Theories, concepts and values in community psychology ==
=== Ecological levels of analysis ===
James Kelly (1966; Trickett, 1984) developed an ecological analogy used to understand the ways in which settings and individuals are interrelated. Unlike the ecological framework developed by Bronfenbrenner (1979), the focus of Kelly's framework was not so much on how different levels of the environment may impact on the individual, but on understanding how human communities function. Specifically, Kelly suggests that there are 4 important principles that govern people in settings:

- adaptation: i.e. that what individuals do is adaptive given the demands of the surrounding context. It is a two-way process: Individuals adapt to the restrictions, constraints, and quality of the environment, while the environment adapts to its members
  - Examples: In regards to adaption of the individual, take for instance when an individual adapts to the demands of a new job, they adapt to that environment by learning or acquiring any necessary skills that they may need to perform their tasks well. On the environmental side of adaption, we can imagine various situations involving the family, such as the birth of a child, new job of a parent, or when children attend college and move away from home; in all of these instances the environment adapted as necessary to the changes in its members
- succession: every setting has a history that created current structures, norms, attitudes, and policies, and any intervention in the setting must appreciate this history and understand why the current system exists in the form that it does. This principle applies to families, organizations, and communities; further, an implication of noting and understanding succession in these units is that psychologists must understand the history of that unit (family, organization, or community) before attempting to implement an intervention plan
- cycling of resources: each setting has resources that need to be identified and possibilities for new resources to be developed; a resource perspective emphasizes a focus on strengths of individuals, groups, and institutions within the setting and interventions are more likely to succeed if they build on such existing strengths, rather than introduce new external mechanisms for change. There are personal resources which include individual talents, strengths, or specialties, as well as social resources such as shared norms, beliefs, or values; further, aspects of the physical environment can be considered resources, such as calm resting places, a library, and other qualities of the space in particular
- interdependence: settings are systems, and any change to one aspect of the setting will have consequences for other aspects of the setting, so any intervention needs to anticipate its impact across the entire setting, and be prepared for unintended consequences. When we look at a school, for instance, as a real-world example, the interdependent parts include: students, teachers, administrators, students' parents, faculty and staff (secretaries, janitors, counselors, nurses), board members, and taxpayers

=== First-order and second-order change ===
Because community psychologists often work on social issues, they are often working toward positive social change. Watzlawick, et al. (1974) differentiated between first-order and second-order change and how second-order change is often the focus of community psychology.

- first-order change: positively changing the individuals in a setting to attempt to fix a problem
- second-order change: Attending to systems and structures involved with the problem to adjust the person–environment fit

As an example of how these methods differ, consider homelessness. A first-order change to "fix" homelessness would be to offer shelter to one or many homeless people. A second-order change would be to address issues in policy regarding affordable housing.

=== Prevention and health promotion ===
Community psychology emphasizes principles and strategies of preventing social, emotional and behavioral problems and wellness and health promotion at the individual and community levels, borrowed from Public health and Preventive medicine, rather than a passive, "waiting-mode," treatment-based medical model. Universal, selective, primary, and indicated or secondary prevention (early identification and intervention) are particularly emphasized. Community psychology's contributions to prevention science have been substantial, including development and evaluation of the Head Start Program.

=== Empowerment ===
One of the goals of community psychology involves empowerment of individuals and communities that have been marginalized by society.

One definition for the term is "an intentional, ongoing process centered in the local community, involving mutual respect, critical reflection, caring, and group participation, through which people lacking an equal share of resources gain greater access to and control over those resources" (Cornell Empowerment Group).

Rappaport's (1984) definition includes: "Empowerment is viewed as a process: the mechanism by which people, organizations, and communities gain mastery over their lives."

While empowerment has had an important place in community psychology research and literature, some have criticized its use. Riger (1993), for example, points to the paradoxical nature of empowerment being a masculine, individualistic construct being used in community research. Community psychologist Guy Holmes critiqued empowerment as a vague concept replete with what Wolf Wolfensberger has called 'high craze value' i.e. a fashionable term that means different things to different people, and ultimately means everything and nothing. Certainly few community psychologists would agree with Mao that 'power grows out of the barrel of a gun.'

In the 1990s, the support and empowerment paradigm (Racino, 1992) was proposed as an organizing concept to replace or complement the prior rehabilitation paradigm, and to acknowledge the diverse groups and community-based work of the emerging community disciplines.

=== Social justice ===
A core value of community psychology is seeking social justice through research and action. Community psychologists are often advocates for equality and policies that allow for the wellbeing of all people, particularly marginalized populations. For example, in May 2019 in the City of Brighton and Hove - Unframed Lives was an event about homelessness and austerity.

=== Diversity ===
Another value of community psychology involves embracing diversity. Rappaport includes diversity as a defining aspect of the field, calling research to be done for the benefit of diverse populations in gaining equality and justice. This value is seen through much of the research done with communities regardless of ethnicity, culture, sexual orientation, disability status, socioeconomic status, gender, and age.

=== Individual wellness ===
Individual wellness is the physical and psychological wellbeing of all people. Research in community psychology focuses on methods to increase individual wellness, particularly through prevention and second-order change.

=== Citizen participation ===
Citizen participation refers to the ability of individuals to have a voice in decision-making, defining and addressing problems, and the dissemination of information gathered on them. This is the basis for the usage of participatory action research in community psychology, where community members are often involved in the research process by sharing their unique knowledge and experience with the research team and working as co-researchers. In contrast, citizen participation is sought by community developers and community planners (i.e., public administrators) to assure that governmental funds best meet the needs of local citizenry. Three key values of participation are: building support for governmental planning, raising political consciousness, and furthering democratic values. Citizen participation in policymaking has a long history and has been particular strong in neighborhood action and poverty programs, and other activist-led initiatives.

=== Collaboration and community strengths ===
Collaboration with community members to construct research and action projects makes community psychology an applied field. By allowing communities to use their knowledge to contribute to projects in a collaborative, fair and equal manner, the process of research can be empowering to citizens. This requires an ongoing relationship between the researcher and the community from before the research begins to after the research is over.

=== Psychological sense of community ===
Psychological sense of community (or simply "sense of community"), was introduced in 1974 by Seymour Sarason. In 1986 a major step was taken by David McMillan and David Chavis with the publication of their "Theory of Sense of Community" and in 1990 the "Sense of Community Index". Originally designed primarily in reference to neighborhoods, the Sense of Community Index (SCI) can be adapted to study other communities as well, including the workplace, schools, religious communities, communities of interest, etc.

=== Empirical grounding ===
Community psychology grounds all advocacy and social justice action in empiricism. This empirical grounding is what separates community psychology from a social movement or grassroots organization. Methods from psychology have been adapted for use in the field that acknowledge value-driven, subjective research involving community members. The methods used in community psychology are therefore tailored to each individual research question. Quantitative as well as qualitative methods and other innovative methods are embraced.

The American Psychological Association has sponsored two major conferences on community research methods and has recently published an edited book on this topic.

== Comparison of community and clinical psychology in the UK ==
Community psychology has been differentiated from traditional clinical psychology as practiced in the UK in the following ways:

Clinical psychology	Community psychology
More likely to work with individuals	More likely to work with groups and communities
Work confined to clinical populations	Work likely to involve the diverse groups in a local community
More likely to take place in a consulting room in a clinic	More likely to take place in a community setting
Focus on symptomatic change in the individual through individually-focused therapies	Focus on community level change through collective action
Work influenced by psychiatric diagnosis	Work influenced by mapping needs at community level and identifying sources of oppression
Work influenced by 'top down' treatment guidelines (e.g. NICE)	Work influenced by 'bottom up' feedback from community collaborators
Evidence base privileges RCTs	Evidence base privileges diverse research methods especially those which emphasise community action and participation
More likely to be short-term or time-limited	More likely to be long term and build and grow over time
Reactive and ameliorative in aim	Preventative and transformational in aim (e.g. advocacy, campaigning and acting to bring social change)

Examples of community psychology in the UK have been documented by Carolyn Kagan and Mark Burton, Jim Orford and Guy Holmes.

== Education ==
Many programs related to community psychology are housed in psychology departments, while others are interdisciplinary. Students earning a community psychology degree complete courses that focus on: history and concepts of the field, human diversity and cultural competence, public health, community research methods and statistics, collaborative work in communities, organizational and community development and consultation, prevention and intervention, program evaluation, and grantwriting.

Research is a large component of both the PhD and master's degrees, as community psychologists base interventions on theory and research and use action-oriented research to promote positive change. Further, students will generally find niches under faculty mentors at their institutions related to local programs, organizations, grants, special populations, or social issues of interest—granting students the chance to have practice doing the work of a community psychologist, under the supervision of a faculty member.

Many community psychologists will find clinical psychologists involved in their work in communities, and collaboration between academic departments are encouraged.

To disseminate the field and make community psychology education free, an online Introduction to Community Psychology textbook was published in June 2019.

== Society for Community Research and Action ==
Division 27 of the American Psychological Association is the community psychology division of the APA, called the Society for Community Research and Action (SCRA). The Society's mission is as follows:

The Society for Community Research and Action (SCRA) is an international organization devoted to advancing theory, research, and social action. Its members are committed to promoting health and empowerment and to preventing problems in communities, groups, and individuals. SCRA serves many different disciplines that focus on community research and action.

The SCRA website has resources for teaching and learning community psychology, information on events in the field and related to research and action, how to become involved and additional information on the field, members and undergraduate and graduate programs in community psychology.

== Peer-reviewed journals ==
The following journals provide peer-reviewed articles related to community psychology:

- American Journal of Community Psychology (Society for Community Research and Action (SCRA) journal)
- The Australian Community Psychologist (Journal of the Australian Psychological Society)
- Journal of Community & Applied Social Psychology (international journal)
- Journal of Community Psychology (international journal)
- Journal of Rural Community Psychology (e-journal)
- Psychosocial Intervention/Intervención Psicosocial (published in both Spanish and English)
- Rivista di Psicologia di Comunità (Italian journal)
- Global Journal of Community Psychology Practice (GJCCP)

In addition, there are a number of interdisciplinary journals, such as the Community Mental Health Journal, with articles in the field of community health that deal with aspects of community psychology.

== See also ==
- Asset-based community development
- Behavior settings
- Community organizing
- Cultural-historical activity theory
- Ethnography
- Grounded theory
- Group dynamics
- Institution
- Large-group capacitation
- Multilevel model
- Photovoice
- Program evaluation
- Psychotherapy and social action model
- Social capital
- Social support
- Systems thinking
