= Community =

Social unit which shares commonality

A community is a social unit (a group of people) with one or more shared socially-significant characteristics, being place, set of norms, culture, religion, values, customs, or identity. Communities may share a sense of place situated in a given geographical area (e.g. a country, village, town, or neighborhood) or in virtual space through communication platforms. Durable good relations that extend beyond immediate genealogical ties also define a sense of community, important to people's identity, practice, and roles in social institutions such as family, home, work, government, society, or humanity at large. Although communities are usually small relative to personal social ties, "community" may also refer to large-group affiliations such as national communities, international communities, and virtual communities.

In terms of sociological categories, a community can seem like a sub-set of a social collectivity. In developmental views, a community can emerge out of a collectivity.

The English-language word "community" derives from the Old French comuneté (Modern French: communauté), which comes from the Latin communitas "community", "public spirit" (from Latin communis, "common").

Human communities may have intent, belief, resources, preferences, needs, and risks in common, affecting the identity of the participants and their degree of cohesiveness.

== Perspectives of various disciplines ==
=== Archaeology ===
Archaeological studies of social communities use the term "community" in two ways, mirroring usage in other areas. The first meaning is an informal definition of community as a place where people used to live. In this literal sense it is synonymous with the concept of an ancient settlement—whether a hamlet, village, town, or city. The second meaning resembles the usage of the term in other social sciences: a community is a group of people living near one another who interact socially. Social interaction on a small scale can be difficult to identify with archaeological data. Most reconstructions of social communities by archaeologists rely on the principle that social interaction in the past was conditioned by physical distance. Therefore, a small village settlement likely constituted a social community and spatial subdivisions of cities and other large settlements may have formed communities. Archaeologists typically use similarities in material culture—from house types to styles of pottery—to reconstruct communities in the past. This classification method relies on the assumption that people or households will share more similarities in the types and styles of their material goods with other members of a social community than they will with outsiders.

=== Ecology ===
In ecology, a community is an assemblage of populations—potentially of different species—interacting with one another. Community ecology is the branch of ecology that studies interactions between and among species. It considers how such interactions, along with interactions between species and the abiotic environment, affect social structure and species richness, diversity and patterns of abundance. Species interact in three ways: competition, predation and mutualism:

- Competition typically results in a double negative—that is both species lose in the interaction.
- Predation involves a win/lose situation, with one species winning.
- Mutualism sees both species co-operating in some way, with both winning.

The two main types of ecological communities are major communities, which are self-sustaining and self-regulating (such as a forest or a lake), and minor communities, which rely on other communities (like fungi decomposing a log) and are the building blocks of major communities. Moreover, we can establish other non-taxonomic subdivisions of biocenosis, such as guilds.

=== Philosophy ===
In light of the debate about the meaning of the “European Community,” a series of European philosophers began to raise concerns with how community has been traditionally conceived in the West. They questioned whether the closed, exclusionary, and identitarian models of community found in the traditions of Communitarianism in Anglo-American philosophy and Classical Social Theory, were suitable for our globalized world. However, instead of abandoning the desire to belong in a community, they attempt to reconceptualize community in an open and inclusive manner. Jean-Luc Nancy is credited with starting this debate with his book The Inoperative Community, followed by Maurice Blanchot’s The Unavowable Community, Giorgio Agamben’s The Coming Community, and Roberto Esposito’s Communitas. Jean-Luc Nancy revised his theory of community in Being Singular Plural, and he delivered a series of reflections on the terms and motifs of this debate in The Disavowed Community. Other books related to this series include Zygmunt Bauman’s Community, Greg Bird’s Containing Community, Miranda Joseph’s Against the Romance of Community, and Alphonso Lingis’ The Community of Those Who Have Nothing in Common.

=== Semantics ===
The concept of "community" often has a positive semantic connotation, exploited rhetorically by populist politicians and by advertisers to promote feelings and associations of mutual well-being, happiness and togetherness—veering towards an almost-achievable utopian community.

In contrast, the epidemiological term "community transmission" can have negative implications, and instead of a "criminal community" one often speaks of a "criminal underworld" or of the "criminal fraternity".

=== Sociology ===
Early sociological studies identified communities as fringe groups at the behest of local power elites. Such early academic studies include Who Governs? by Robert Dahl as well as the papers by Floyd Hunter on Atlanta. At the turn of the 21st century the concept of community was rediscovered by academics, politicians, and activists. Politicians hoping for a democratic election started to realign with community interests.

=== Others ===
The Shona (in Zimbabwe) include ancestral spirits (midzimu) in their conceptualisation of the community.

== Key concepts ==
=== Gemeinschaft and Gesellschaft ===
In Gemeinschaft und Gesellschaft (1887), German sociologist Ferdinand Tönnies described two types of human association: Gemeinschaft (usually translated as "community") and Gesellschaft ("society" or "association"). Tönnies proposed the Gemeinschaft–Gesellschaft dichotomy as a way to think about social ties. No group is exclusively one or the other. Gemeinschaft stress personal social interactions, and the roles, values, and beliefs based on such interactions. Gesellschaft stress indirect interactions, impersonal roles, formal values, and beliefs based on such interactions.

=== Sense of community ===
In a seminal 1986 study, McMillan and Chavis identify four elements of "sense of community":

1. membership: feeling of belonging or of sharing a sense of personal relatedness,
2. influence: mattering, making a difference to a group and of the group mattering to its members
3. reinforcement: integration and fulfillment of needs,
4. shared emotional connection.

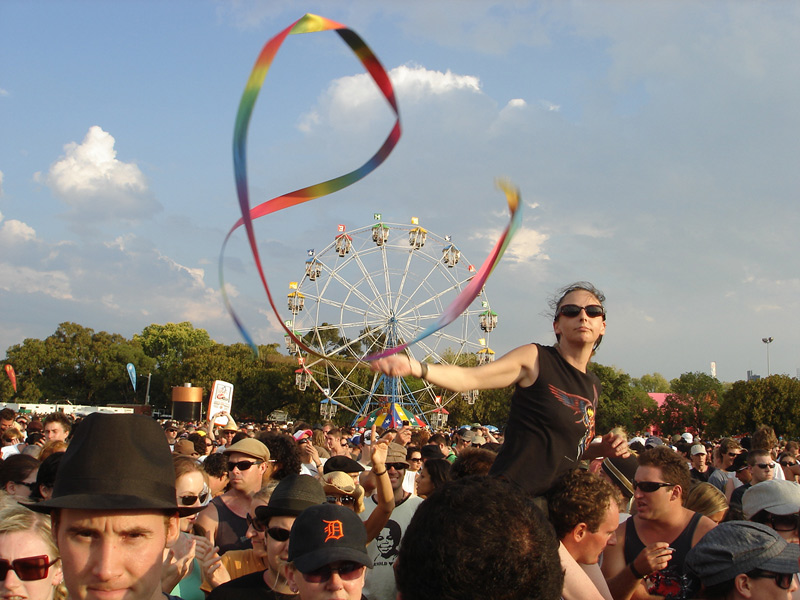
To what extent do participants in joint activities experience a sense of community?

A "sense of community index" (SCI) was developed by Chavis and colleagues, and revised and adapted by others. Although originally designed to assess sense of community in neighborhoods, the index has been adapted for use in schools, the workplace, and a variety of types of communities.

Studies conducted by the American Psychological Association indicate that young adults who feel a sense of belonging in a community, particularly small communities, develop fewer psychiatric and depressive disorders than those who do not have the feeling of love and belonging.

==== Socialization ====
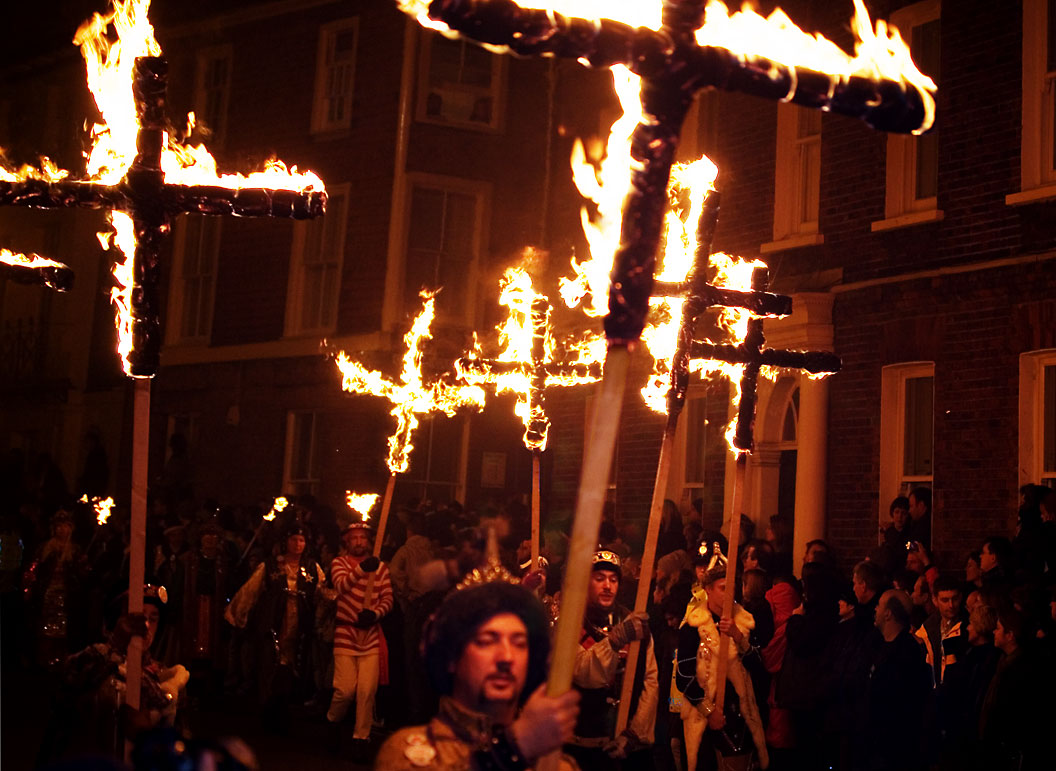
Lewes Bonfire Night procession commemorating 17 Protestant martyrs burnt at the stake from 1555 to 1557

The process of learning to adopt the behavior patterns of the community is called socialization. The most fertile time of socialization is usually the early stages of life, during which individuals develop the skills and knowledge and learn the roles necessary to function within their culture and social environment. For some psychologists, especially those in the psychodynamic tradition, the most important period of socialization is between the ages of one and ten. But socialization also includes adults moving into a significantly different environment where they must learn a new set of behaviors.

Socialization is influenced primarily by the family, through which children first learn community norms. Other important influences include schools, peer groups, people, mass media, the workplace, and government. The degree to which the norms of a particular society or community are adopted determines one's willingness to engage with others. The norms of tolerance, reciprocity, and trust are important "habits of the heart", as de Tocqueville put it, in an individual's involvement in community.

== Development ==
Community development is often linked with community work or community planning, and may involve stakeholders, foundations, governments, or contracted entities including non-government organisations (NGOs), universities or government agencies to progress the social well-being of local, regional and, sometimes, national communities. More grassroots efforts, called community building or community organizing, seek to empower individuals and groups of people by providing them with the skills they need to effect change in their own communities. These skills often assist in building political power through the formation of large social groups working for a common agenda. Community development practitioners understand how to work with individuals and affect communities' positions within the context of larger social institutions. Public administrators, in contrast, understand community development in the context of rural and urban development, housing and economic development, and community, organizational and business development.

Formal accredited programs conducted by universities, as part of degree granting institutions, are often used to build a knowledge base to drive curricula in public administration, sociology and community studies. The General Social Survey from the National Opinion Research Center at the University of Chicago and the Saguaro Seminar at the Harvard Kennedy School are examples of national community development in the United States. The Maxwell School of Citizenship and Public Affairs at Syracuse University in New York State offers core courses in community and economic development, and in areas ranging from non-profit development to US budgeting (federal to local, community funds). In the United Kingdom, the University of Oxford has led in providing extensive research in the field through its Community Development Journal, used worldwide by sociologists and community development practitioners.

At the intersection between community development and community building are a number of programs and organizations with community development tools. One example of this is the program of the Asset Based Community Development Institute of Northwestern University. The institute makes available downloadable tools to assess community assets and make connections between non-profit groups and other organizations that can help in community building. The Institute focuses on helping communities develop by "mobilizing neighborhood assets" – building from the inside out rather than the outside in. In the disability field, community building was prevalent in the 1980s and 1990s with roots in John McKnight's approaches.

=== Building and organizing ===
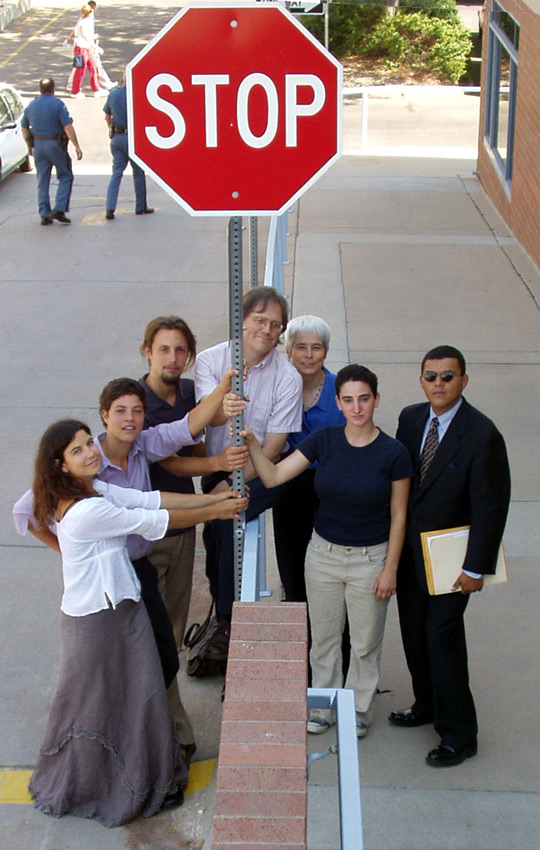
The anti-war affinity group "Collateral Damage" protesting the Iraq War

In The Different Drum: Community-Making and Peace (1987) Scott Peck argues that the almost accidental sense of community that exists at times of crisis can be consciously built. Peck believes that conscious community building is a process of deliberate design based on the knowledge and application of certain rules. He states that this process goes through four stages:

1. Pseudocommunity: When people first come together, they try to be "nice" and present what they feel are their most personable and friendly characteristics.
2. Chaos: People move beyond the inauthenticity of pseudo-community and feel safe enough to present their "shadow" selves.
3. Emptiness: Moves beyond the attempts to fix, heal and convert of the chaos stage, when all people become capable of acknowledging their own woundedness and brokenness, common to human beings.
4. True community: Deep respect and true listening for the needs of the other people in this community.

In 1991, Peck remarked that building a sense of community is easy but maintaining this sense of community is difficult in the modern world. An interview with M. Scott Peck by Alan Atkisson. In Context #29, p. 26. The three basic types of community organizing are grassroots organizing, coalition building, and "institution-based community organizing", (also called "broad-based community organizing", an example of which is faith-based community organizing, or Congregation-based Community Organizing).

Community building can use a wide variety of practices, ranging from simple events (e.g., potlucks, small book clubs) to larger-scale efforts (e.g., mass festivals, construction projects that involve local participants rather than outside contractors).

Community building that is geared toward citizen action is usually termed "community organizing". In these cases, organized community groups seek accountability from elected officials and increased direct representation within decision-making bodies. Where good-faith negotiations fail, these constituency-led organizations seek to pressure the decision-makers through a variety of means, including picketing, boycotting, sit-ins, petitioning, and electoral politics.

Community organizing can focus on more than just resolving specific issues. Organizing often means building a widely accessible power structure, often with the end goal of distributing power equally throughout the community. Community organizers generally seek to build groups that are open and democratic in governance. Such groups facilitate and encourage consensus decision-making with a focus on the general health of the community rather than a specific interest group.

If communities are developed based on something they share in common, whether location or values, then one challenge for developing communities is how to incorporate individuality and differences. Rebekah Nathan suggests in her book, My Freshman Year, we are drawn to developing communities totally based on sameness, despite stated commitments to diversity, such as those found on university websites.

== Types ==
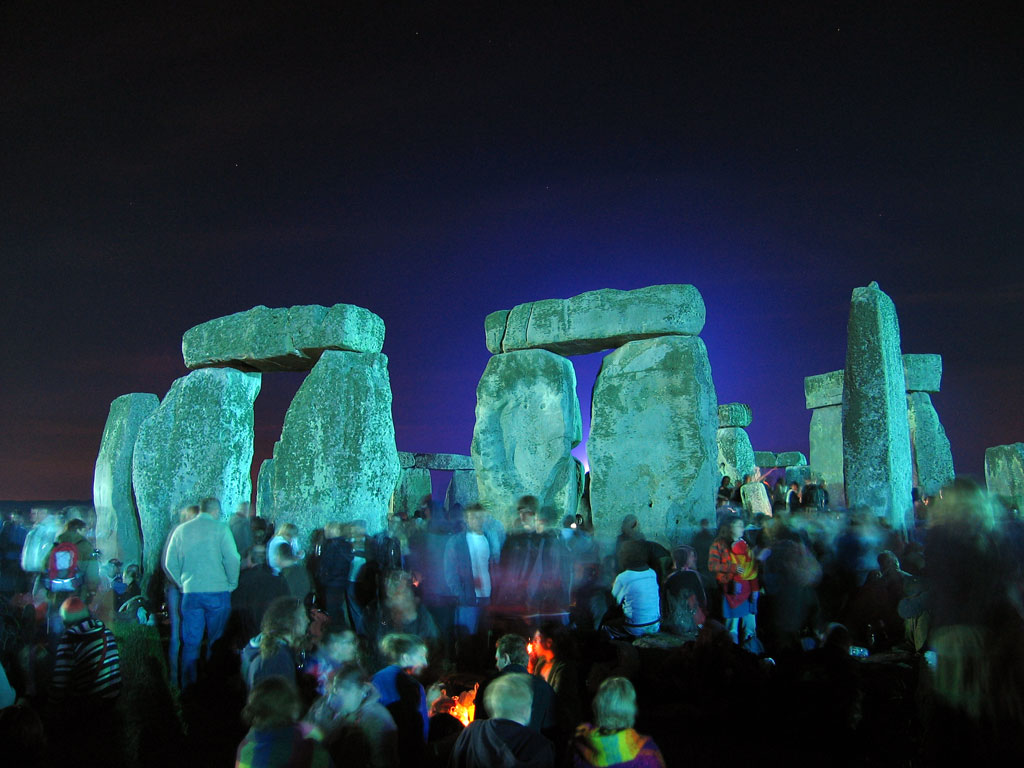
A community of interest gathers at Stonehenge, England, for the summer solstice.

A number of ways to categorize types of community have been proposed. One such breakdown is as follows:

1. Location-based: range from the local neighbourhood, suburb, village, town or city, region, nation or even the planet as a whole. These are also called communities of place.
2. Identity-based: range from the local clique, sub-culture, ethnic group, religious, multicultural or pluralistic civilisation, or the global community cultures of today. They may be included as communities of need or identity, such as disabled persons, or frail aged people.
3. Organizationally-based: range from communities organized informally around family or network-based guilds and associations to more formal incorporated associations, political decision-making structures, economic enterprises, or professional associations at a small, national or international scale.
4. Intentional: a mix of all three previous types, these are highly cohesive residential communities with a common social or spiritual purpose, ranging from monasteries and ashrams to modern ecovillages and housing cooperatives.

The usual categorizations of community relations have a number of problems: (1) they tend to give the impression that a particular community can be defined as just this kind or another; (2) they tend to conflate modern and customary community relations; (3) they tend to take sociological categories such as ethnicity or race as given, forgetting that different ethnically defined persons live in different kinds of communities—grounded, interest-based, diasporic, etc.

In response to these problems, Paul James and his colleagues have developed a taxonomy that maps community relations, and recognizes that actual communities can be characterized by different kinds of relations at the same time:

1. Grounded community relations. This involves enduring attachment to particular places and particular people. It is the dominant form taken by customary and tribal communities. In these kinds of communities, the land is fundamental to identity.
2. Life-style community relations. This involves giving primacy to communities coming together around particular chosen ways of life, such as morally charged or interest-based relations or just living or working in the same location. Hence the following sub-forms:
  1. community-life as morally bounded, a form taken by many traditional faith-based communities.
  2. community-life as interest-based, including sporting, leisure-based and business communities which come together for regular moments of engagement.
  3. community-life as proximately-related, where neighbourhood or commonality of association forms a community of convenience, or a community of place (see below).
3. Projected community relations. This is where a community is self-consciously treated as an entity to be projected and re-created. It can be projected as through thin advertising slogan, for example gated community, or can take the form of ongoing associations of people who seek political integration, communities of practice based on professional projects, associative communities which seek to enhance and support individual creativity, autonomy and mutuality. A nation is one of the largest forms of projected or imagined community.

In these terms, communities can be nested and/or intersecting; one community can contain another—for example a location-based community may contain a number of ethnic communities. Both lists above can be used in a cross-cutting matrix in relation to each other.

== Internet communities ==
In general, virtual communities value knowledge and information as currency or social resource. What differentiates virtual communities from their physical counterparts is the extent and impact of "weak ties", which are the relationships acquaintances or strangers form to acquire information through online networks. Relationships among members in a virtual community tend to focus on information exchange about specific topics. A survey conducted by Pew Internet and The American Life Project in 2001 found those involved in entertainment, professional, and sports virtual-groups focused their activities on obtaining information.

An epidemic of bullying and harassment has arisen from the exchange of information between strangers, especially among teenagers, in virtual communities. Despite attempts to implement anti-bullying policies, Sheri Bauman, professor of counselling at the University of Arizona, claims the "most effective strategies to prevent bullying" may cost companies revenue.

Virtual Internet-mediated communities can interact with offline real-life activity, potentially forming strong and tight-knit groups such as QAnon.

== See also ==
- Circles of Sustainability
- Communitarianism
- Community theatre
- Community wind energy
- Engaged theory
- Outline of community
- Wikipedia community
