= Community of interest =

Type of affinity group

A community of interest, or interest-based community, is a community of people who share a common interest or passion. These people exchange ideas and thoughts about the given passion, but may know (or care) little about each other outside this area. Participation in a community of interest can be compelling, entertaining and create a community where people return frequently and remain for extended periods. Frequently, they cannot be easily defined by a particular geographical area.

In other words, "a community of interest is a gathering of people assembled around a topic of common interest. Its members take part in the community to exchange information, to obtain answers to personal questions or problems, to improve their understanding of a subject, to share common passions or to play." In contrast to a spatial community, "a community of interest is defined not by space, but by some common bond (e.g. feeling of attachment) or entity (e.g. farming, church group)".

Online communities connect to communities of interest in that often, they develop out of interests in a particular topic. A benefit of online communities over place-based communities is that of non-physical access to group involvement.

== See also ==
- Community of action
- Community of circumstance
- Community of practice
- Community of innovation
- Commune
- Affinity group
