= Outline of humans =

Mankind: Species of hominid known as Homo sapiens

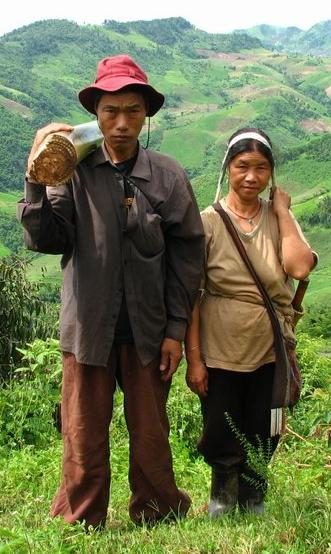
Male (left) and female (right) adult humans

The following outline is provided as an overview of and topical guide to humans:

Humans are great apes characterized by their hairlessness, bipedalism, and high intelligence. Humans have large brains, enabling more advanced cognitive skills that facilitate successful adaptation to varied environments, development of sophisticated tools, and formation of complex social structures and civilizations.

== Descriptions of humans ==
The common name of the human species in English is historically man (from Germanic mann), often replaced by the Latinate human (since the 16th century).

- Biped - Animal with two legs

=== Taxonomy ===
- Eukaryote – Domain of life whose cells have nuclei
  - Animal – Kingdom of life
    - Chordate – Phylum of animals having a dorsal nerve cord
      - Mammal – Class of animals with milk-producing glands
        - Primate – Order of mammals
          - Haplorhini – Suborder of primates
            - Simian – Infraorder of primates
              - Hominidae – Family of primates
                - Homininae – Subfamily of mammals
                  - Hominini – Tribe of mammals
                    - Homo – Genus of hominins
                      - Homo sapiens – Species of hominid in the genus Homo

== History ==
- By discipline
- By period
- By region
- By field
- Historians
- Research

== Evolution ==
- Evolution of mammals
- Evolution of primates
- Homo
- Early modern human
- Recent human evolution

== Biology ==
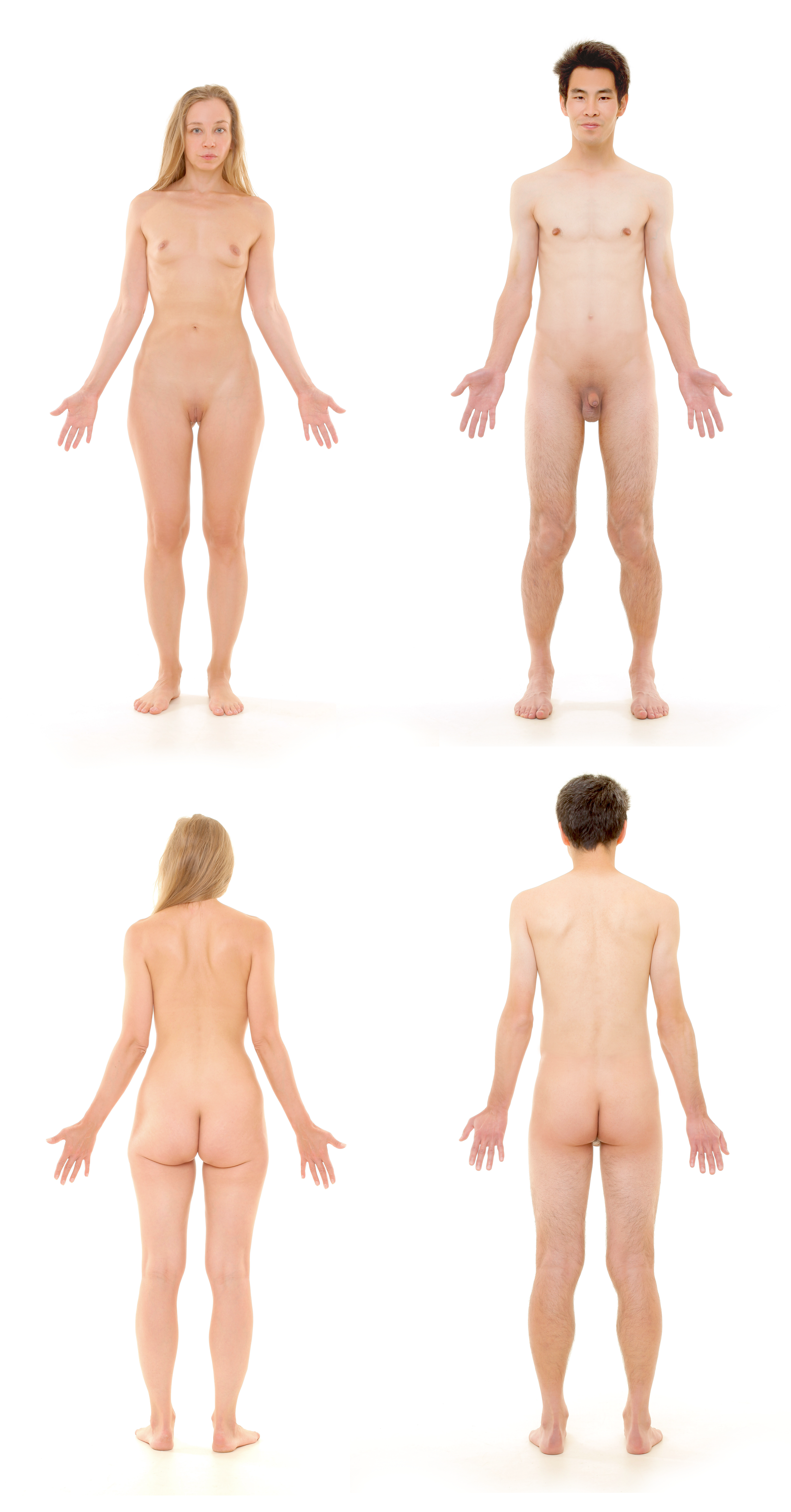
Female (left) and male (right) adult human bodies photographed in ventral (above) and dorsal (below) perspectives. Naturally-occurring pubic, body, and facial hair have been deliberately removed to show anatomy.

- Human parasite
- Population (human biology)
- Regeneration in humans
- Neoteny in humans
- Human physiology
- Human genetics
  - Human genetic variation
- Human life cycle - Stages of life not tied to development
  - Infant
  - Childbirth
  - Old age
- Human nutrition
- Human anatomy, outline

=== Composition ===
In order of size ascending.

- Elements
- Cells
- Tissues
- Organs
- Organ systems

=== Development stages ===
- Prenatal development
- Mini-puberty
- Childhood
  - Other stages
- Adolescence
- Adulthood

== Culture ==
- Language
  - Linguistics, outline
  - Lists of languages
    - English language
- Art
  - Performing arts, outline
  - Visual arts, outline
- Science, outline
- Philosophy, outline
- Religion, outline

== Society ==
- Conceptions
- Types
- Infrastructure
- Social institutions
  - Role
- Societal change

== See also ==
- Human vestigiality
- Human geography
- Demography
  - Human population
  - Human life expectancy
- Lists of celebrities
