= Mini-puberty =

Stage in human endocrine development

Mini-puberty is a transient hormonal activation of the hypothalamic-pituitary-gonadal (HPG) axis that occurs in infants shortly after birth. This period is characterized by a surge in the secretion of gonadotropins (LH and FSH) and sex steroids (testosterone in males and estradiol in females), similar to but less intense than the hormonal changes that occur in puberty during adolescence. Mini-puberty plays a crucial role in the early development of the reproductive system and the establishment of secondary sexual characteristics.

== Physiology ==
=== Hypothalamic-pituitary-gonadal axis activation ===
Mini-puberty begins within the first few days or weeks of life and typically lasts until 6–12 months of age. The HPG axis is temporarily reactivated, resulting in increased secretion of gonadotropin-releasing hormone (GnRH) from the hypothalamus. GnRH stimulates the pituitary gland to release luteinizing hormone (LH) and follicle-stimulating hormone (FSH), which in turn stimulate the gonads (testes in males and ovaries in females) to produce sex steroids.

=== Hormonal changes ===
- Males: There is a significant increase in testosterone levels, peaking around 1–3 months of age and leveling off around 6 months. This rise in testosterone is essential for the development of male genitalia, testicular descent, and the proliferation of Sertoli and Leydig cells.
- Females: There is an increase in estradiol and FSH levels, although less pronounced compared to the hormonal changes in males. This rise in estradiol is involved in the maturation of ovarian follicles and the growth of the uterus and levels off around 2 years of life. FSH peaks at 1–3 months, similar to boys, but may remain elevated for 3–4 years of life.

== Clinical significance ==
=== Developmental role ===
Mini-puberty is crucial for several developmental processes, including:

- Sexual differentiation: In males, the surge in testosterone supports the continued development of male genitalia and other secondary sexual characteristics.
- Growth and metabolism: The hormonal changes may have effects on growth patterns, bone maturation, and overall metabolism.
- Neurodevelopment: Sex steroids play a role in brain development and may influence behaviors and cognitive functions, including language development.

=== Diagnostic marker ===
Mini-puberty can serve as a valuable diagnostic window for identifying congenital abnormalities of the HPG axis or gonads. Conditions such as congenital hypogonadotropic hypogonadism and certain forms of intersex can be diagnosed during this period by evaluating hormone levels and gonadal response.

=== Potential disorders ===
Disruptions in the mini-puberty process can lead to various clinical conditions, including:

- Delayed or absent mini-puberty: This may indicate underlying issues with the HPG axis or gonads, requiring further investigation and potential intervention.

=== Environmental influences ===
Environmental factors, such as exposure to Endocrine Disrupting Chemicals (EDCs), have been shown to impact mini-puberty. EDCs are widespread in daily life and can be found in products such as pesticides and personal care items. Bisphenol A (BPA) and many phthalates are known to interfere with the earlier HPG axis activation during pregnancy for boys, affecting testosterone levels during mini-puberty, anogenital distance (AGD), and testicular descent.

More recently, BPA and phthalate exposure during mini-puberty have been shown to interfere with HPG axis activation and testosterone levels during that same time frame, suggesting that mini-puberty is a particularly vulnerable window for EDC exposure. Such disruptions may lead to long-term consequences, including delayed or precocious puberty, reproductive health issues, and increased risk of conditions like polyendocrine metabolic ovarian syndrome (PMOS), breast cancer and prostate cancer.

In a small study, it was shown that "PCDD/Fs and PCBs measured in breast milk collected within the first 3 weeks following birth were more strongly associated with sexually dimorphic outcomes than exposures measured in maternal blood collected between weeks 28 and 43" of pregnancy, adding evidence that EDC exposure during mini-puberty may interfere with endocrine and neurological development.

== Research and future directions ==
Although the phenomenon has been known for over 40 years, research into mini-puberty continues to uncover its broader implications for long-term health and development. The potential impact of environmental factors and endocrine disruptors on mini-puberty is an area of active investigation. At the same time, researchers also investigate if mini-puberty may be a window to treat certain disorders, e.g. treating micropenis using gonadotropin (testosterone) injections.

== See also ==
- Development of the endocrine system
