= Outline of society =

Overview of and topical guide to society

The following outline is provided as an overview of and topical guide to society:

Society – group of people sharing the same geographical or virtual territory and therefore subject to the same political authority and dominant cultural expectations. Such people share a distinctive culture and institutions, which characterize the patterns of social relations between them. Large societies typically develop social stratification and dominance patterns among its subgroups. A given society may be described as the sum total of social relationships among its members. The branch of science that studies society is sociology.

== What type of thing is a society? ==
A society can be described as all of the following:

- System
  - Social system
- People
  - Social group
    - Community

== Types of societies ==
- Humanity – the entire human race. As a whole, it can be viewed as one great big society.

=== In anthropology: by methods of subsistence ===
- Pre-industrial society
  - Hunter-gatherer society
  - Pastoral society
  - Horticultural society
  - Agrarian society
    - Feudal society
- Industrial society
- Post-industrial society

=== In sociology and political science ===
- by political structure:
  - Band society
  - Tribe
  - Chiefdom
  - Civilization
    - State, list
    - Country
    - International community
    - World community
- by modernity:
  - Pre-modern
  - Modern
  - Post-modern

== Aspects or features of societies ==
- Communities (outline) – while a society is a type of community, it can itself comprise smaller communities.
  - Structure and agency
  - Socialization
  - Sense of community
  - Communitarianism
  - Social capital
  - Community development
- Culture (outline) – Shared culture can create sub communities of people within a society due to their shared attitudes, values, goals and practices (ref: Woodward, K., (2004) Questioning Identity: gender, class, ethnicity, Milton Keynes, The Open University).
  - Cultural heritage
- Economy (outline)
  - Economic system
- Education (outline)
- Government
- Identity – Interaction with others within our society helps shape our identity (along with our gender, class & cultural origins), and a shared society can promote a sense of shared identity (ref: Woodward, K., (2004) Questioning Identity: gender, class, ethnicity, Milton Keynes, The Open University).
  - Gender
    - Anti-gender movement
- Infrastructure – see Infrastructure section, below
- Institutions – see Social institutions section, below
- Land
- Natural resources
- People
- Politics (outline)
- Social control
  - Guilt society
  - Shame society
- Social structure
  - Social order
  - Social stratification
- Technology and society (outline)
- Wealth

=== Infrastructure ===
Infrastructure

- Public infrastructure
  - Transportation systems
    - Road systems
      - Roads
      - Highways
      - Streets
      - Bridges
      - Tunnels
    - Mass transit
    - Airports and Airways
  - Water supply and Water resources
  - Wastewater management
  - Solid-waste treatment and disposal
  - Electric power
- Private infrastructure
  - Personal property
    - Automobiles
    - Personal computers
  - Real estate
    - Homes

=== Social institutions ===
Social institution – Any persistent structure or mechanism of social order governing the behaviour of a set of individuals within a given community. The term "institution" is commonly applied to customs and behavior patterns important to a society, as well as to particular formal organizations of government and public services.

- Family
  - Family members – families are composed of:
    - Offspring
      - Daughter
      - Son
    - Parent
      - Father
      - Mother
    - Grandparent
  - Types of families
    - Nuclear family
    - Extended family
  - Family related topics
    - Home
    - Human bonding
    - Sociology of the family
- Government
- Marriage and the family
- Religion (outline) and religious institutions – see sociology of religion; civil religion
- Educational institutions – schools (preschool, primary/elementary, secondary, and post-secondary/higher – see Sociology of education)
- Research community – Academic institutions and universities; research institutes – see sociology of science
- Medicine – hospitals and other health care institutions – see sociology of health and illness, medical sociology
  - Psychiatric hospitals (history)
- Law (outline) and legal system – courts; judges; the legal profession (bar) – see jurisprudence, philosophy of law, sociology of law
  - Law enforcement and society
  - Criminal justice or penal systems – prisons – see sociology of punishment
- Military (outline) – (See also military sociology).
  - Paramilitary
- Police forces
- Mass media – including the news media (television, newspapers) and the popular media – see media studies
- Industry – businesses, including corporations – see financial institution, factory, capitalism, division of labour, social class, industrial sociology
- Civil society or NGOs – Charitable organizations; advocacy groups; political parties; think tanks; virtual communities
- Role

== Societal change ==
- Social change
  - Decadence
  - Social development
    - Social progress
    - Technological evolution
    - Sociocultural evolution

=== Stages of sociocultural evolution ===
Sociocultural evolution – below are listed some typical and some potential stages of progression in the evolution of cultures and societies:

- Pre-civilization
  - Hunter-gatherer bands
  - Social rank
  - Tribes
  - Social stratification
  - Chiefdoms
  - Neolithic Revolution
- Civilization
  - Pre-industrial society
    - Agrarian society
      - Agrarian villages
      - Towns
      - Cities
      - City-states
      - Nation-states
  - Industrial Revolution
  - Modernity
    - Industrial society
  - Postmodernity
    - Post-industrial society
  - Informational Revolution
  - Information society
    - Digital Revolution
    - Knowledge society
  - Globalization – process by which the world is becoming more interconnected, being integrated into a unified global community, through the interchange — of world views, products, ideas and other aspects of culture — made possible by technological advancements in communication and transportation and the dissemination of knowledge those bring.
  - World government? – notion of a single common political authority (global state) for all of humanity. Currently there is no worldwide executive, legislature, judiciary, military, or constitution with jurisdiction over the entire planet. The United Nations is limited to a mostly advisory role, and its stated purpose is to foster cooperation between existing national governments rather than exert authority over them.
- Space colonization? – hypothetical expansion of the human race into outer space: to the moon, to other planets or moons, or in space stations.
- Technological singularity? (TS) – hypothetical result that may occur if and when strong AI (artificial intelligence at least as smart as a human) is developed. Such AIs would be recursive, and therefore able to improve themselves (or each other) at an increasingly rapid rate to super intelligence. Technological advancements implemented by such entities would probably be so profound and come so quickly that it seems unlikely anyone could reliably forecast what such a future would be like — like a black hole, a singularity we cannot see.

=== Forces of societal change ===
- Connections – James Burke presented in this TV series his hypothesis that the entire gestalt of the modern world is the result of a web of interconnected events, each one consisting of a person or group acting for reasons of their own motivations (e.g., profit, curiosity, religious) with no concept of the final, modern result to which the actions of either them or their contemporaries would lead. The interplay of the results of these isolated events is what drives history and innovation.
- Conquest
- Cooperation
- Deviance
- Disaster
- Economic forces
  - Economic growth
- Exploration
- Human migration – Migration can impact on our identity since it may be difficult to feel a sense of belonging in a new society. Human migration can also introduce new cultural values to a society (ref: Held, D., (2004) A globalizing world? Culture, economics and politics, London Routeledge/The Open University).
- Population change
  - Population decline
  - Population growth
- Revolution
- Social conflict
- Social disintegration
- Social movement
- Societal collapse
- Technological change
- Urbanization
- Trade
- War

== History of society ==
- History of civilization
- Society-related history
  - Rural history
  - Social history
  - Urban history
- Sociocultural evolution

== Study of society: sociology ==
Outline of sociology

- Sociology – Scientific study of society. This social science directs methods of empirical investigation and critical analysis upon human social activity, focusing on the influence of relationships and how they affect attitudes and behaviours. Sociologists conduct research to refine the theoretical understanding of social processes, or for application to social policy and welfare.
  - Branches of sociology
  - History of sociology

== See also ==
- Outline of community

Place these

Ethnic groups •

Social institutions – Organization
Social network – Communication • Journalism • Social capital

- Sociality
