= Development of the endocrine system =

Mechanisms that form the endocrine system

The fetal endocrine system is one of the first systems to develop during prenatal development of a human individual. The endocrine system arises from all three embryonic germ layers. The endocrine glands that produce the steroid hormones, such as the gonads and adrenal cortex, arise from the mesoderm. In contrast, endocrine glands that arise from the endoderm and ectoderm produce the amine, peptide, and protein hormones.

== Adrenal glands ==
The fetal adrenal cortex can be identified within four weeks of pregnancy. The adrenal cortex originates from the thickening of the intermediate mesoderm. At five to six weeks of gestation, the mesonephros differentiates into a tissue known as the gonadal ridge. The gonadal ridge produces the steroidogenic cells for both the gonads and the adrenal cortex. The adrenal medulla is derived from ectodermal cells. Cells that will become adrenal tissue move retroperitoneally to the upper portion of the mesonephros. At seven weeks of gestation, the adrenal cells are joined by sympathetic cells that originate from the neural crest to form the adrenal medulla. At the end of the eighth week, the adrenal glands have been encapsulated and have formed a distinct organ above the developing kidneys. At birth, the adrenal glands weigh approximately eight to nine grams (twice that of the adult adrenal glands) and are 0.5% of the total body weight. At 25 weeks, the adult adrenal cortex zone develops and is responsible for the primary synthesis of steroids during the early postnatal weeks.

== Thyroid gland ==
The thyroid gland develops from two different clusterings of embryonic cells. One part is from the thickening of the pharyngeal floor, which serves as the precursor of the thyroxine (T_{4}) producing follicular cells. The other part is from the caudal extensions of the fourth pharyngobranchial pouches which results in the parafollicular calcitonin-secreting cells. These two structures are apparent by 16 to 17 days of gestation. Around the 24th day of pregnancy, the foramen cecum, a thin, flask-like diverticulum of the median anlage develops. At approximately 24 to 32 days of gestation, the median anlage develops into a bilobed structure. By 50 days of gestation, the medial and lateral anlage have fused together. At 12 weeks of gestation, the fetal thyroid is capable of storing iodine for the production of TRH, TSH, and free thyroid hormone. At 20 weeks, the fetus is able to implement feedback mechanisms for the production of thyroid hormones. During fetal development, T_{4} is the major thyroid hormone being produced while triiodothyronine (T_{3}) and its inactive derivative, reverse T_{3}, are not detected until the third trimester.

== Parathyroid glands ==
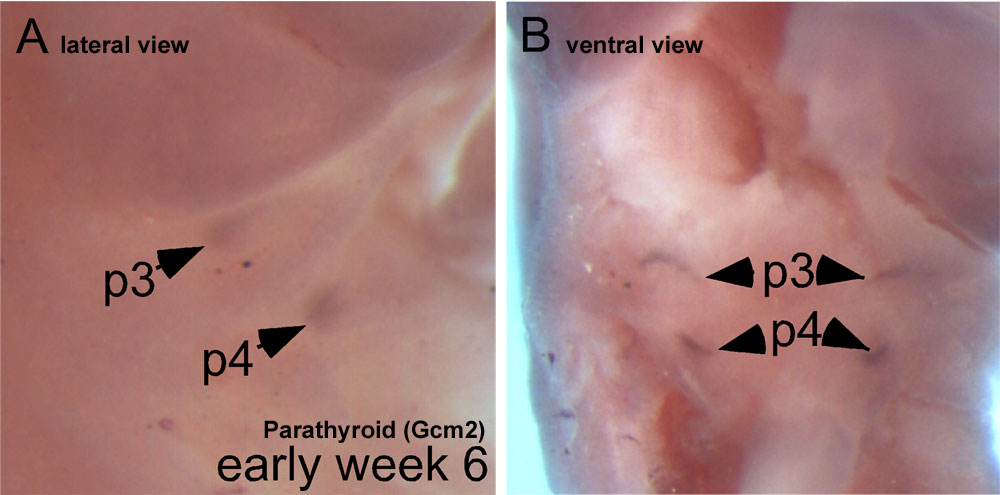
A lateral and ventral view of an embryo showing the third (inferior) and fourth (superior) parathyroid glands during the 6th week of embryogenesis

Once the embryo reaches four weeks of gestation, the parathyroid glands begins to develop. The human embryo forms five sets of endoderm-lined pharyngeal pouches. The third and fourth pouch are responsible for developing into the inferior and superior parathyroid glands, respectively. The third pharyngeal pouch encounters the developing thyroid gland and they migrate down to the lower poles of the thyroid lobes. The fourth pharyngeal pouch later encounters the developing thyroid gland and migrates to the upper poles of the thyroid lobes. At 14 weeks of gestation, the parathyroid glands begin to enlarge from 0.1 mm in diameter to approximately 1 – 2 mm at birth. The developing parathyroid glands are physiologically functional beginning in the second trimester.

Studies in mice have shown that interfering with the HOX15 gene can cause parathyroid gland aplasia, which suggests the gene plays an important role in the development of the parathyroid gland. The genes, TBX1, CRKL, GATA3, GCM2, and SOX3 have also been shown to play a crucial role in the formation of the parathyroid gland. Mutations in TBX1 and CRKL genes are correlated with DiGeorge syndrome, while mutations in GATA3 have also resulted in a DiGeorge-like syndrome. Malformations in the GCM2 gene have resulted in hypoparathyroidism. Studies on SOX3 gene mutations have demonstrated that it plays a role in parathyroid development. These mutations also lead to varying degrees of hypopituitarism.

== Pancreas ==
The human fetal pancreas begins to develop by the fourth week of gestation. Five weeks later, the pancreatic alpha and beta cells have begun to emerge. Reaching eight to ten weeks into development, the pancreas starts producing insulin, glucagon, somatostatin, and pancreatic polypeptide. During the early stages of fetal development, the number of pancreatic alpha cells outnumbers the number of pancreatic beta cells. The alpha cells reach their peak in the middle stage of gestation. From the middle stage until term, the beta cells continue to increase in number until they reach an approximate 1:1 ratio with the alpha cells. The insulin concentration within the fetal pancreas is 3.6 pmol/g at seven to ten weeks, which rises to 30 pmol/g at 16–25 weeks of gestation. Near term, the insulin concentration increases to 93 pmol/g. The endocrine cells have dispersed throughout the body within 10 weeks. At 31 weeks of development, the islets of Langerhans have differentiated.

While the fetal pancreas has functional beta cells by 14 to 24 weeks of gestation, the amount of insulin that is released into the bloodstream is relatively low. In a study of pregnant women carrying fetuses in the mid-gestation and near term stages of development, the fetuses did not have an increase in plasma insulin levels in response to injections of high levels of glucose. In contrast to insulin, the fetal plasma glucagon levels are relatively high and continue to increase during development. At the mid-stage of gestation, the glucagon concentration is 6 μg/g, compared to 2 μg/g in adult humans. Just like insulin, fetal glucagon plasma levels do not change in response to an infusion of glucose. However, a study of an infusion of alanine into pregnant women was shown to increase the cord blood and maternal glucagon concentrations, demonstrating a fetal response to amino acid exposure.

As such, while the fetal pancreatic alpha and beta islet cells have fully developed and are capable of hormone synthesis during the remaining fetal maturation, the islet cells are relatively immature in their capacity to produce glucagon and insulin. This is thought to be a result of the relatively stable levels of fetal serum glucose concentrations achieved via maternal transfer of glucose through the placenta. On the other hand, the stable fetal serum glucose levels could be attributed to the absence of pancreatic signaling initiated by incretins during feeding. In addition, the fetal pancreatic islets cells are unable to sufficiently produce cAMP and rapidly degrade cAMP by phosphodiesterase necessary to secrete glucagon and insulin.

During fetal development, the storage of glycogen is controlled by fetal glucocorticoids and placental lactogen. Fetal insulin is responsible for increasing glucose uptake and lipogenesis during the stages leading up to birth. Fetal cells contain a higher amount of insulin receptors in comparison to adults cells and fetal insulin receptors are not downregulated in cases of hyperinsulinemia. In comparison, fetal haptic glucagon receptors are lowered in comparison to adult cells and the glycemic effect of glucagon is blunted. This temporary physiological change aids the increased rate of fetal development during the final trimester. Poorly managed maternal diabetes mellitus is linked to fetal macrosomia, increased risk of miscarriage, and defects in fetal development. Maternal hyperglycemia is also linked to increased insulin levels and beta cell hyperplasia in the post-term infant. Children of diabetic mothers are at an increased risk for conditions such as: polycythemia, renal vein thrombosis, hypocalcemia, respiratory distress syndrome, jaundice, cardiomyopathy, congenital heart disease, and improper organ development.

== Gonads ==
The reproductive system begins development at four to five weeks of gestation with germ cell migration. The bipotential gonad results from the collection of the medioventral region of the urogenital ridge. At the five-week point, the developing gonads break away from the adrenal primordium. Gonadal differentiation begins 42 days following conception.

=== Male gonadal development ===
For males, the testes form at six fetal weeks and the sertoli cells begin developing by the eight week of gestation. SRY, the sex-determining locus, serves to differentiate the Sertoli cells. The Sertoli cells are the point of origin for anti-Müllerian hormone. Once synthesized, the anti-Müllerian hormone initiates the ipsilateral regression of the Müllerian tract and inhibits the development of female internal features. At 10 weeks of gestation, the Leydig cells begin to produce androgen hormones. The androgen hormone dihydrotestosterone is responsible for the development of the male external genitalia.

The testicles descend during prenatal development in a two-stage process that begins at eight weeks of gestation and continues through the middle of the third trimester. During the transabdominal stage (8 to 15 weeks of gestation), the gubernacular ligament contracts and begins to thicken. The craniosuspensory ligament begins to break down. This stage is regulated by the secretion of insulin-like 3 (INSL3), a relaxin-like factor produced by the testicles, and the INSL3 G-coupled receptor, LGR8. During the transinguinal phase (25 to 35 weeks of gestation), the testicles descend into the scrotum. This stage is regulated by androgens, the genitofemoral nerve, and calcitonin gene-related peptide. During the second and third trimester, testicular development concludes with the diminution of the fetal Leydig cells and the lengthening and coiling of the seminiferous cords.

=== Female gonadal development ===
For females, the ovaries become morphologically visible by the 8th week of gestation. The absence of testosterone results in the diminution of the Wolffian structures. The Müllerian structures remain and develop into the fallopian tubes, uterus, and the upper region of the vagina. The urogenital sinus develops into the urethra and lower region of the vagina, the genital tubercle develops into the clitoris, the urogenital folds develop into the labia minora, and the urogenital swellings develop into the labia majora. At 16 weeks of gestation, the ovaries produce FSH and LH/hCG receptors. At 20 weeks of gestation, the theca cell precursors are present and oogonia mitosis is occurring. At 25 weeks of gestation, the ovary is morphologically defined and folliculogenesis can begin.

Studies of gene expression show that a specific complement of genes, such as follistatin and multiple cyclin kinase inhibitors are involved in ovarian development. An assortment of genes and proteins - such as WNT4, RSPO1, FOXL2, and various estrogen receptors - have been shown to prevent the development of testicles or the lineage of male-type cells.

== Pituitary gland ==
The pituitary gland is formed within the rostral neural plate. The Rathke's pouch, a cavity of ectodermal cells of the oropharynx, forms between the fourth and fifth week of gestation and upon full development, it gives rise to the anterior pituitary gland. By seven weeks of gestation, the anterior pituitary vascular system begins to develop. During the first 12 weeks of gestation, the anterior pituitary undergoes cellular differentiation. At 20 weeks of gestation, the hypophyseal portal system has developed. The Rathke's pouch grows towards the third ventricle and fuses with the diverticulum. This eliminates the lumen and the structure becomes Rathke's cleft. The posterior pituitary lobe is formed from the diverticulum. Portions of the pituitary tissue may remain in the nasopharyngeal midline. In rare cases, this results in functioning ectopic hormone-secreting tumors in the nasopharynx.

The functional development of the anterior pituitary involves spatiotemporal regulation of transcription factors expressed in pituitary stem cells and dynamic gradients of local soluble factors. The coordination of the dorsal gradient of pituitary morphogenesis is dependent on neuroectodermal signals from the infundibular bone morphogenetic protein 4 (BMP4). This protein is responsible for the development of the initial invagination of the Rathke's pouch. Other essential proteins necessary for pituitary cell proliferation are fibroblast growth factor 8 (FGF8), Wnt4, and Wnt5. Ventral developmental patterning and the expression of transcription factors is influenced by the gradients of BMP2 and sonic hedgehog protein (SHH). These factors are essential for coordinating early patterns of cell proliferation.

Six weeks into gestation, the corticotroph cells can be identified. By seven weeks of gestation, the anterior pituitary is capable of secreting ACTH. Within eight weeks of gestation, somatotroph cells begin to develop with cytoplasmic expression of human growth hormone. Once a fetus reaches 12 weeks of development, the thyrotrophs begin expression of Beta subunits for TSH, while gonadotrophs being to express beta-subunits for LH and FSH. Male fetuses predominately produced LH-expressing gonadotrophs, while female fetuses produce an equal expression of LH and FSH expressing gonadotrophs. At 24 weeks of gestation, prolactin-expressing lactotrophs begin to emerge.
