= Society =

Connected group of individuals

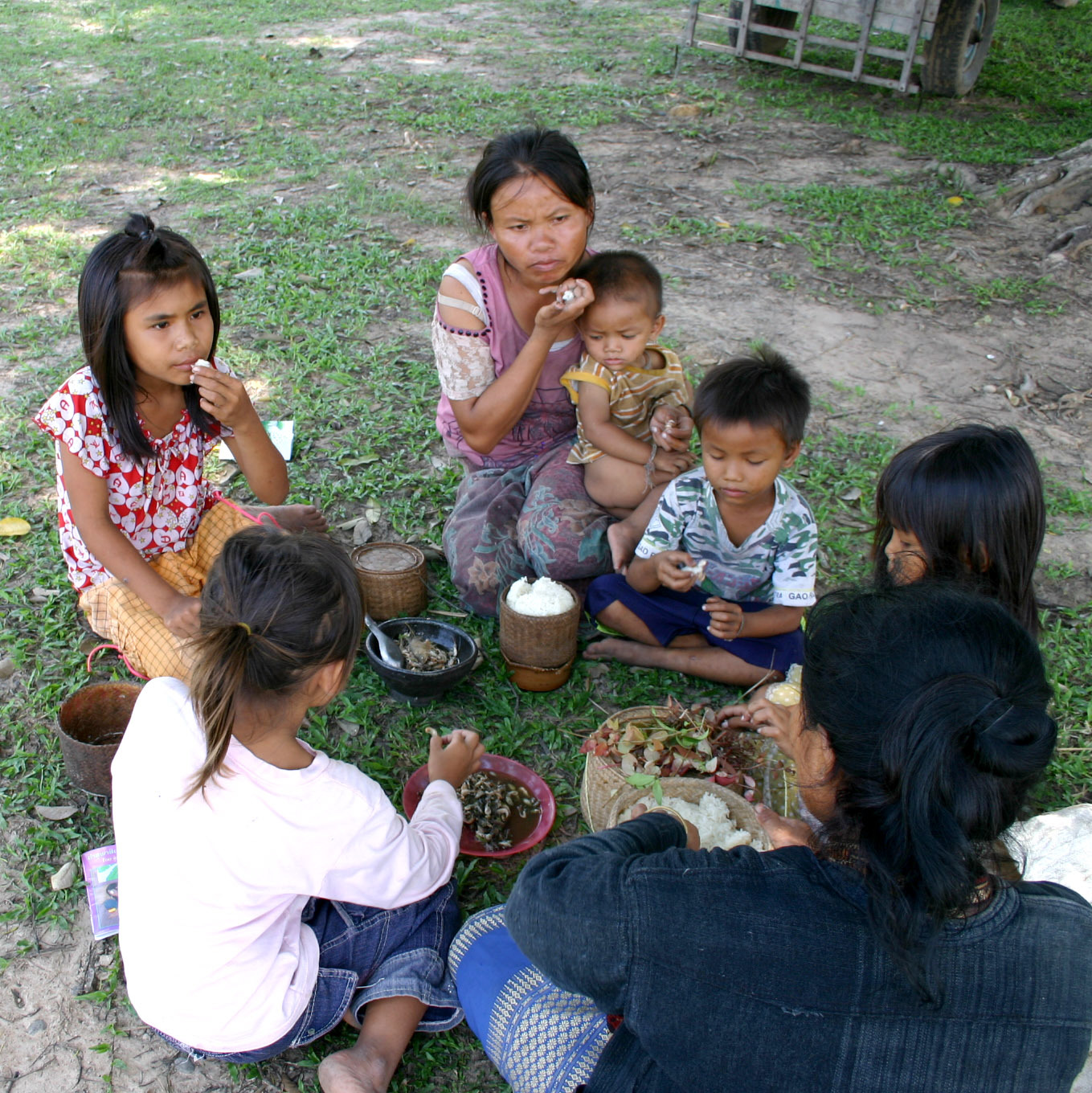
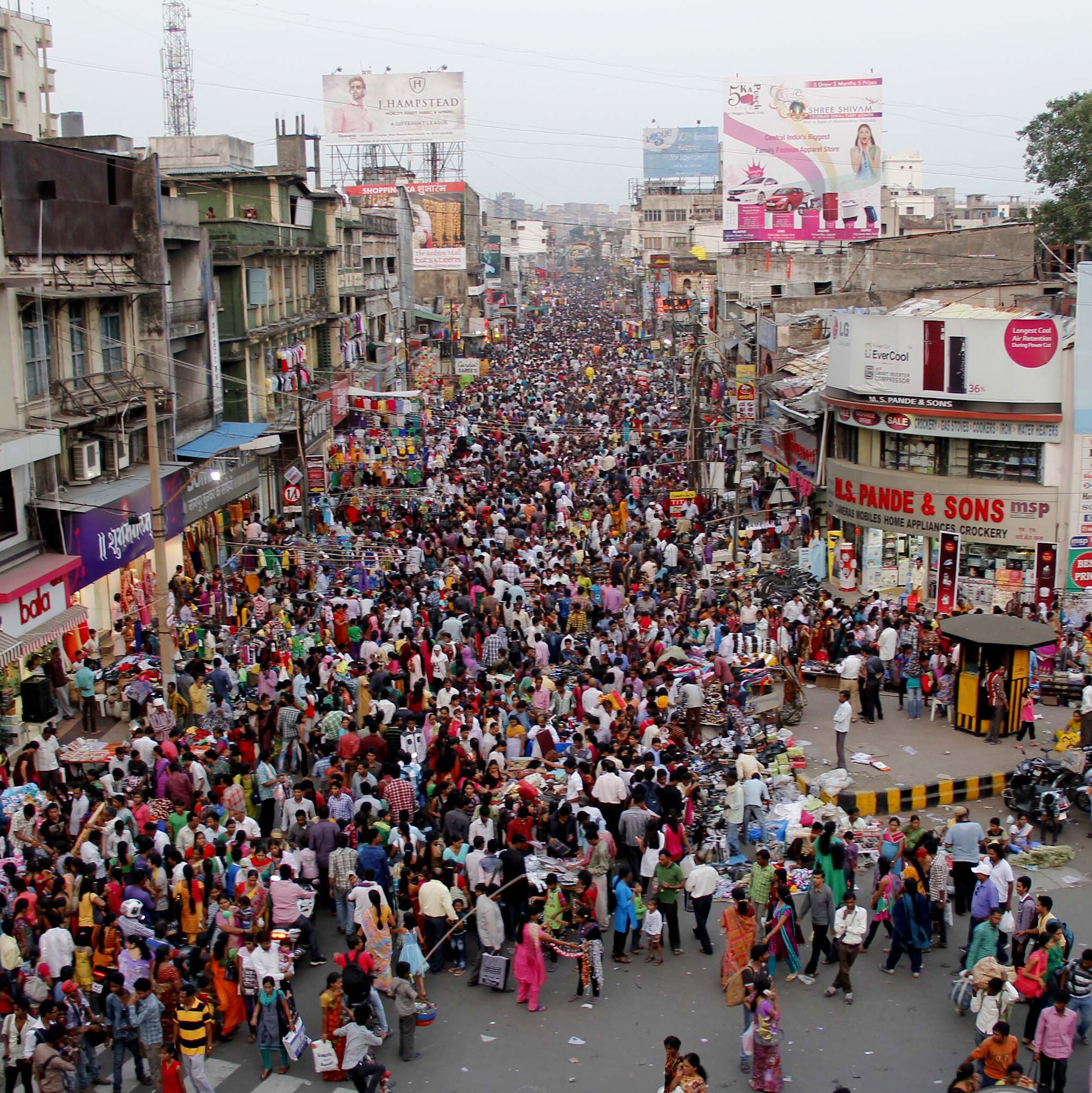
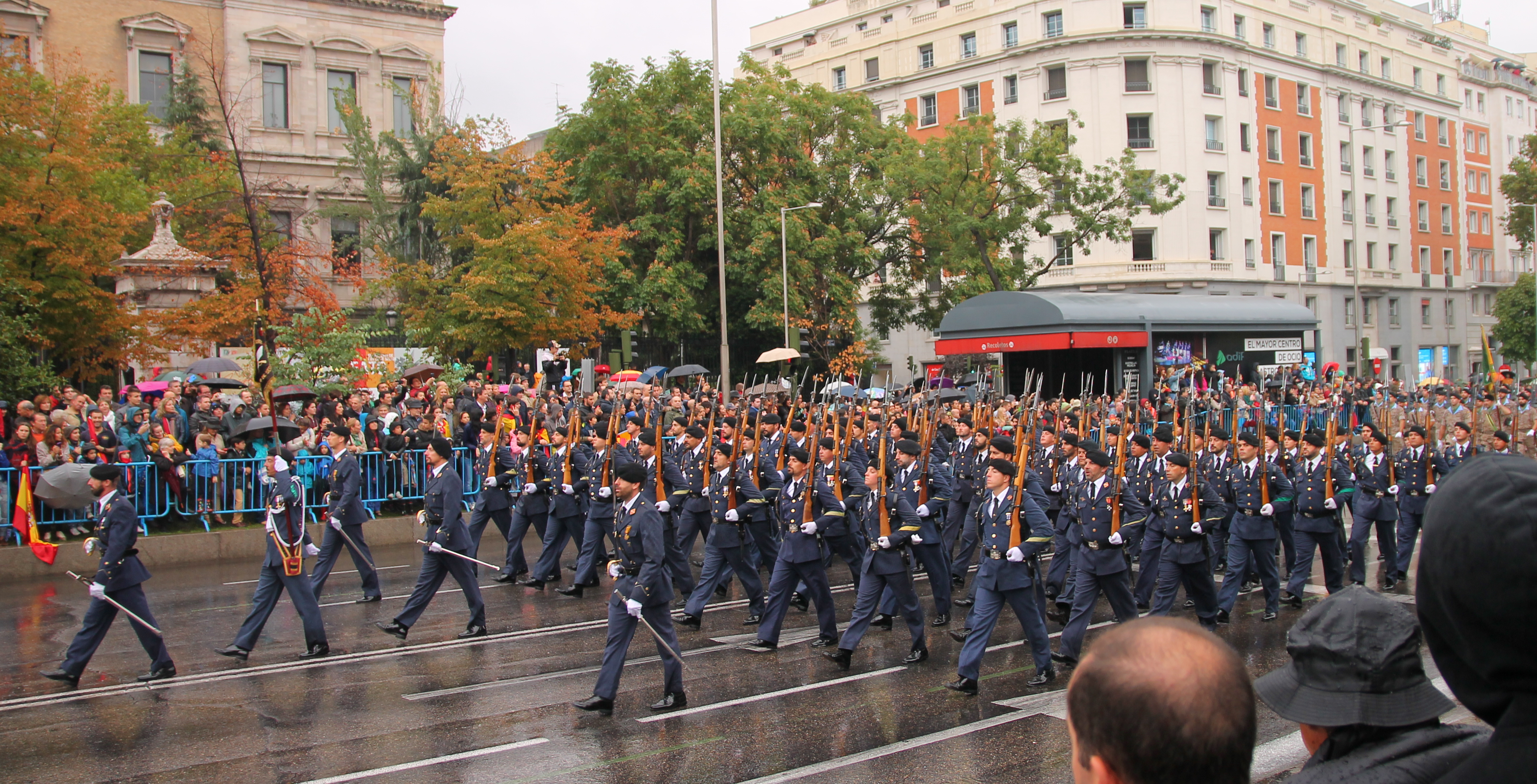
Clockwise from top left: A family in Savannakhet, Laos; a crowd shopping in Maharashtra, India; a military parade on a Spanish national holiday.

A society is a large social group sharing the same spatial or social territory, typically subject to the same political authority and dominant cultural expectations. Societies are characterized by patterns of relationships (social relations) between individuals who share a distinctive culture and institutions; a given society may be described as the sum total of such relationships among its constituent members.

Human social structures are complex and highly cooperative, featuring the specialization of labor via social roles. Societies construct roles and other patterns of behavior by deeming certain actions or concepts acceptable or unacceptable—these expectations around behavior within a given society are known as societal norms. So far as it is collaborative, a society can enable its members to benefit in ways that would otherwise be difficult on an individual basis.

Societies vary based on level of technology and type of economic activity. Larger societies with larger food surpluses often exhibit stratification or dominance patterns. Societies can have many different forms of government, various ways of understanding kinship, and different gender roles. Human behavior varies immensely between different societies; humans shape society, but society in turn shapes human beings.

== Etymology and usage ==
The term "society" commonly refers to a large group of people living in an ordered community within a country or across several similar countries, or to the "state of being with other people", as in the phrase "they lived in medieval society".

The term dates back to at least 1513 and originates from the 12th-century French societe (modern French société), meaning "company". The French term was derived from the Latin word societas ("fellowship", "alliance", or "association"), which itself comes from the noun socius ("comrade", friend, or ally).

The word "social" derives from the Latin word socii ('allies'). It is particularly derived from the Italian Socii states, historical allies of the Roman Republic, though they rebelled against Rome in the Social War of 91–87 BC.

== Conceptions ==
=== In biology ===
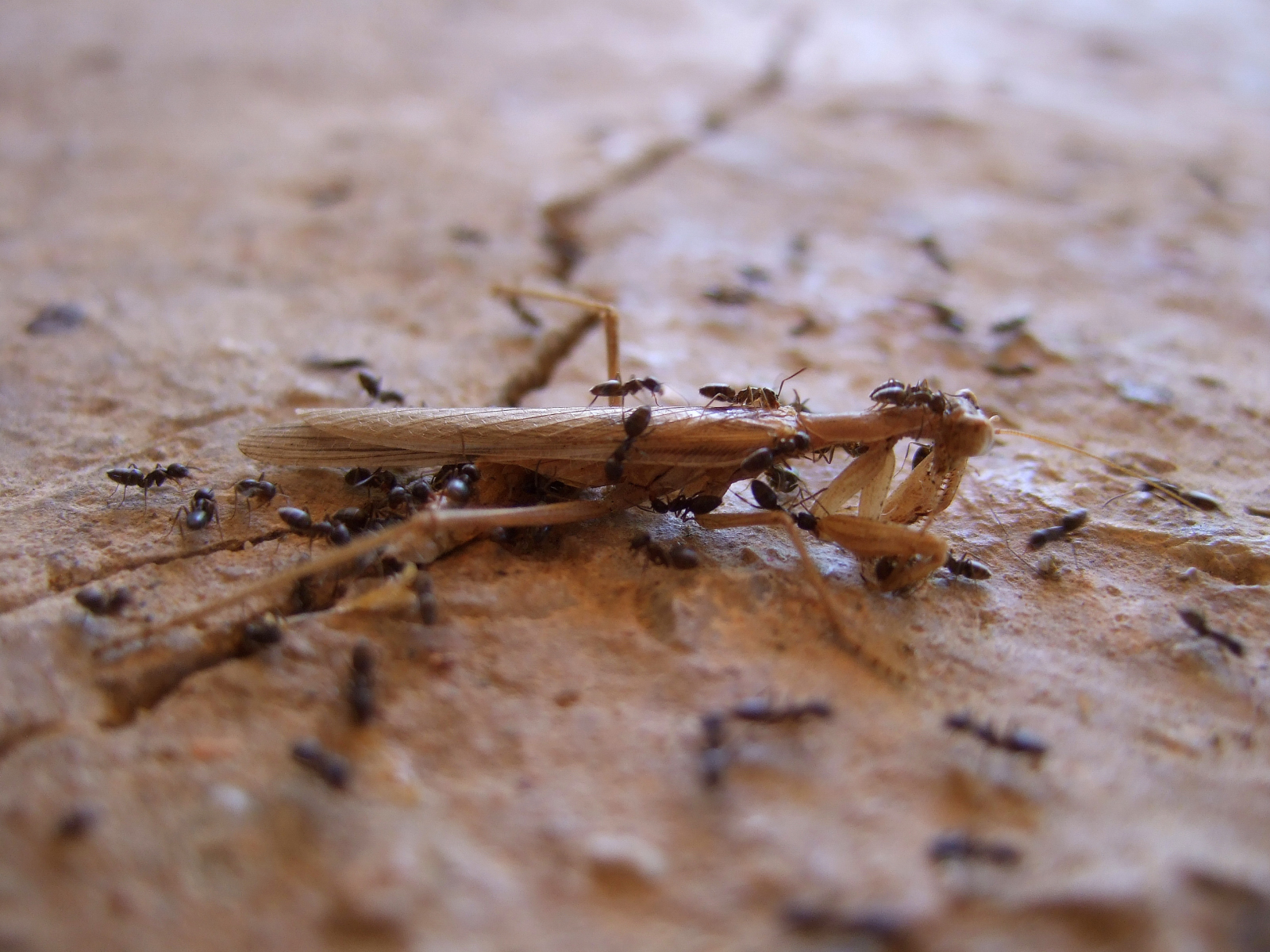
Ant social ethology: Ants are eusocial insects. The social group enables its members to benefit in ways that would not otherwise be possible on an individual basis.

Humans, along with their closest relatives, bonobos and chimpanzees, are highly social animals. This biological context suggests that the underlying sociability required for the formation of societies is hardwired into human nature. Human society features high degrees of cooperation, and differs in important ways from groups of chimps and bonobos, including the parental role of males, the use of language to communicate, the specialization of labor, and the tendency to build "nests" (multi-generational camps, towns, or cities).

Some biologists, including entomologist E.O. Wilson, categorize humans as eusocial, placing humans with ants in the highest level of sociability on the spectrum of animal ethology, although others disagree. Social group living may have evolved in humans due to group selection in physical environments that made survival difficult.

=== In sociology ===
In Western sociology, there are three dominant paradigms for understanding society: functionalism (also known as structural functionalism), conflict theory, and symbolic interactionism.

In the view of Karl Marx, human beings are intrinsically, necessarily and by definition social beings who, beyond being "gregarious creatures", cannot survive and meet their needs other than through social cooperation and association. Their social characteristics are therefore to a large extent an objectively given fact, stamped on them from birth and affirmed by socialization processes; and, according to Marx, in producing and reproducing their material life, people must necessarily enter into relations of production which are "independent of their will".

By contrast, the sociologist Max Weber, for example, defines human action as "social" if—by virtue of the subjective meanings attached to the action by individuals—it "takes account of the behavior of others, and is thereby oriented in its course".

==== Functionalism ====
According to the functionalist school of thought, individuals in society work together like organs in the body to create emergent behavior, sometimes referred to as collective consciousness. 19th century sociologists Auguste Comte and Émile Durkheim, for example, believed that society constitutes a separate "level" of reality, distinct from both biological and inorganic matter. Explanations of social phenomena had therefore to be constructed within this level, individuals being merely transient occupants of comparatively stable social roles.

==== Conflict theory ====
Conflict theorists take the opposite view, and posit that individuals and social groups or social classes within society interact on the basis of conflict rather than agreement. One prominent conflict theorist is Karl Marx, who conceived of society as operating on an economic "base" with a "superstructure" of government, family, religion, and culture. Marx argues that the economic base determines the superstructure, and that throughout history, societal change has been driven by conflict between laborers and those who own the means of production.

==== Symbolic interactionism ====
Symbolic interactionism is a microsociological theory that focuses on individuals and how the individual relates to society. Symbolic interactionists study humans' use of shared language to create common symbols and meanings, and use this frame of reference to understand how individuals interact to create symbolic worlds, and in turn, how these worlds shape individual behaviors.

In the latter half of the 20th century, theorists began to view society as socially constructed. In this vein, sociologist Peter L. Berger describes society as "dialectic": Society is created by humans, but this creation in turn creates or molds humans.

==== Non-Western views ====
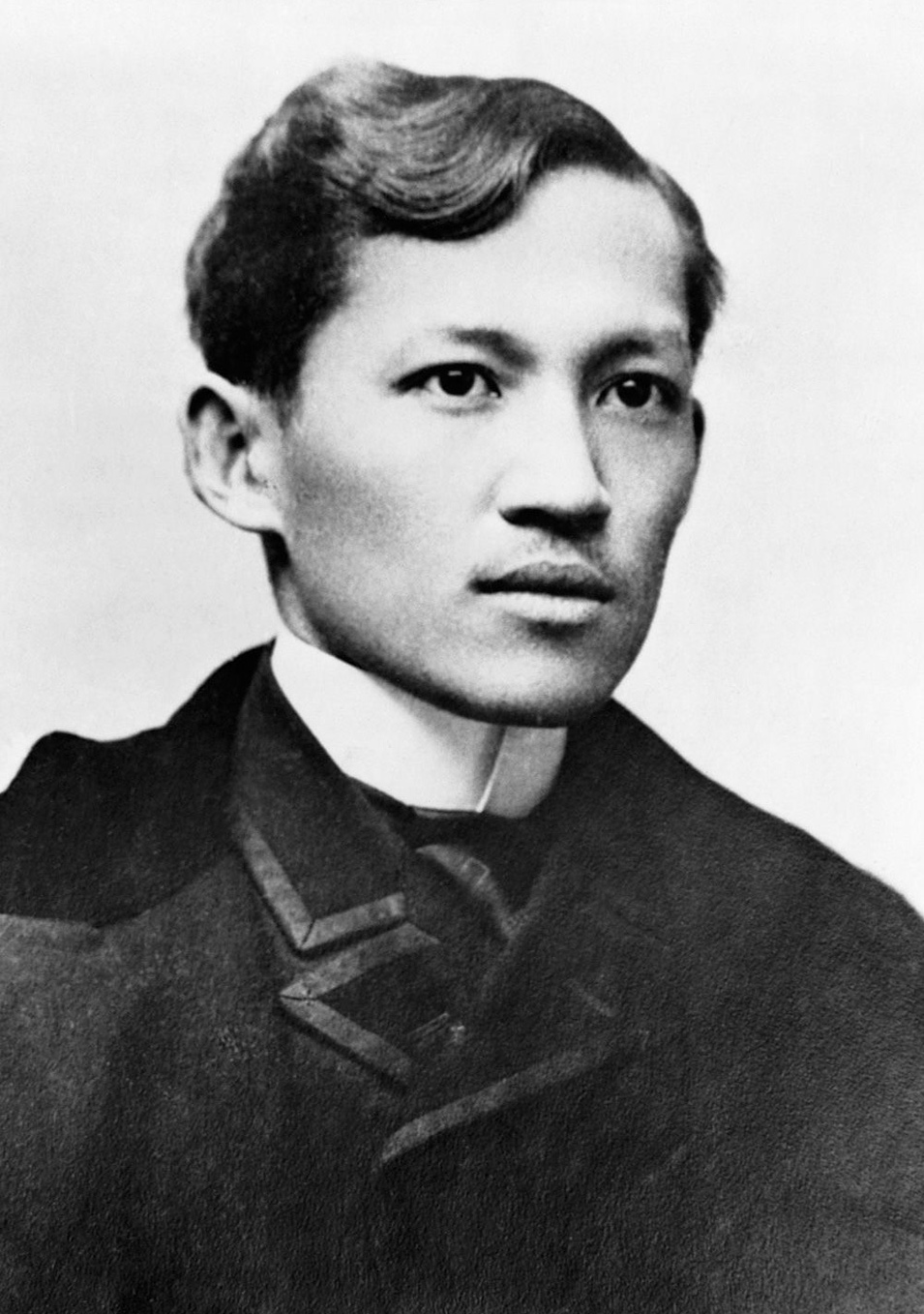
José Rizal, a theorist of colonial societies

The sociological emphasis placed on functionalism, conflict theory, and symbolic interactionism has been criticized as Eurocentric. The Malaysian sociologist Syed Farid al-Attas, for example, argues that Western thinkers are particularly interested in the implications of modernity, and that their analysis of non-Western cultures is therefore limited in scope. As examples of non-Western thinkers who took a systematic approach to understanding society, al-Attas mentions Ibn Khaldun (1332–1406) and José Rizal (1861–1896).

Khaldun, an Arab living in the 14th century, understood society, along with the rest of the universe, as having "meaningful configuration", with its perceived randomness attributable to hidden causes. Khaldun conceptualized social structures as having two fundamental forms: nomadic and sedentary. Nomadic life has high social cohesion (asabijja), which Khaldun argued arose from kinship, shared customs, and a shared need for defense. Sedentary life, in Khaldun's view, was marked by secularization, decreased social cohesion, and increased interest in luxury. Rizal was a Filipino nationalist living toward the end of the Spanish Colonial Period who theorized about colonial societies. Rizal argued that indolence, which the Spanish used to justify their colonial occupation, was instead caused by the colonial occupation. Rizal compared the pre-colonial era, when the Filipinos controlled trade routes and had higher economic activity, to the period of colonial rule, and argued that exploitation, economic disorder, and colonial policies that discouraged farming led to a decreased interest in work.

== Types ==
Sociologists tend to classify societies based on their level of technology, and place societies in three broad categories: pre-industrial, industrial, and post-industrial.

Subdivisions of these categories vary, and classifications are often based on level of technology, communication, and economy. One example of such a classification comes from sociologist Gerhard Lenski, who lists: (1) hunting and gathering; (2) horticultural; (3) agricultural; and (4) industrial; as well as specialized societies (e.g., fishing or herding).

Some cultures have developed over time toward more complex forms of organization and control. This cultural evolution has a profound effect on patterns of community. Hunter-gatherer tribes have, at times, settled around seasonal food stocks to become agrarian villages. Villages have grown to become towns and cities. Cities have turned into city-states and nation-states. However, these processes are not unidirectional.

=== Pre-industrial ===
In a pre-industrial society, food production, which is carried out through the use of human and animal labor, is the main economic activity. These societies can be subdivided according to their level of technology and their method of producing food. These subdivisions are hunting and gathering, pastoral, horticultural, and agrarian.

==== Hunting and gathering ====
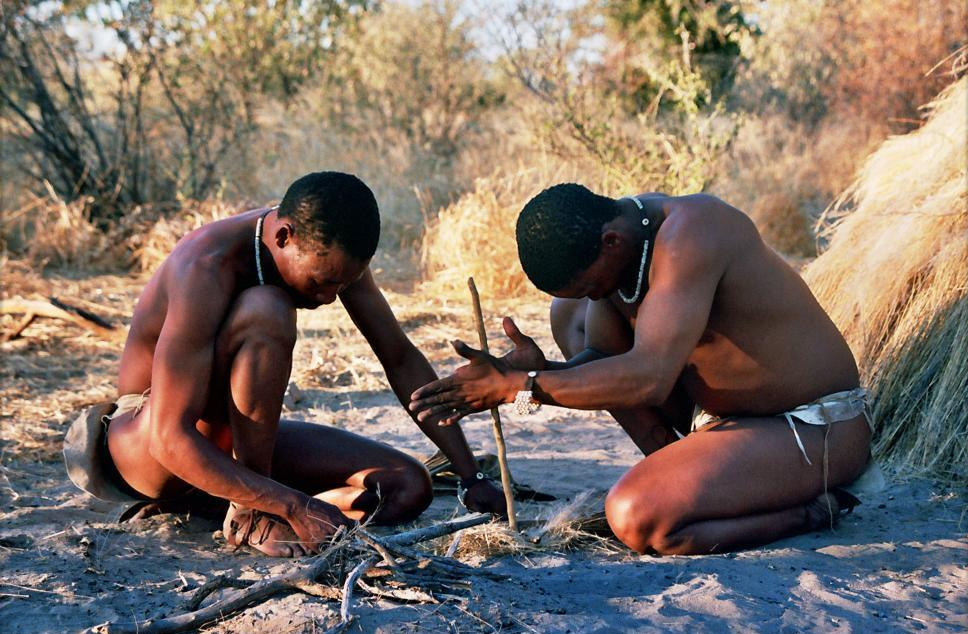
San people in Botswana start a fire by hand.

The main form of food production in hunter-gatherer societies is the daily collection of wild plants and the hunting of wild animals. Hunter-gatherers move around constantly in search of food. As a result, they do not build permanent villages or create a wide variety of artifacts. The need for mobility also limits the size of these societies, and they usually only form small groups such as bands and tribes, usually with fewer than 50 people per community. Bands and tribes are relatively egalitarian, and decisions are reached through consensus. There are no formal political offices containing real power in band societies; rather, a chief is merely a person of influence, and leadership is based on personal qualities. The family forms the main social unit, with most members being related by birth or marriage.

The anthropologist Marshall Sahlins described hunter-gatherers as the "original affluent society" due to their extended leisure time: Sahlins estimated that adults in hunter-gatherer societies work three to five hours per day. This perspective has been challenged by other researchers, who have pointed out high mortality rates and perennial warfare in hunter-gatherer societies. Proponents of Sahlins' view argue that the general well-being of humans in hunter-gatherer societies challenges the purported relationship between technological advancement and human progress.

==== Pastoral ====
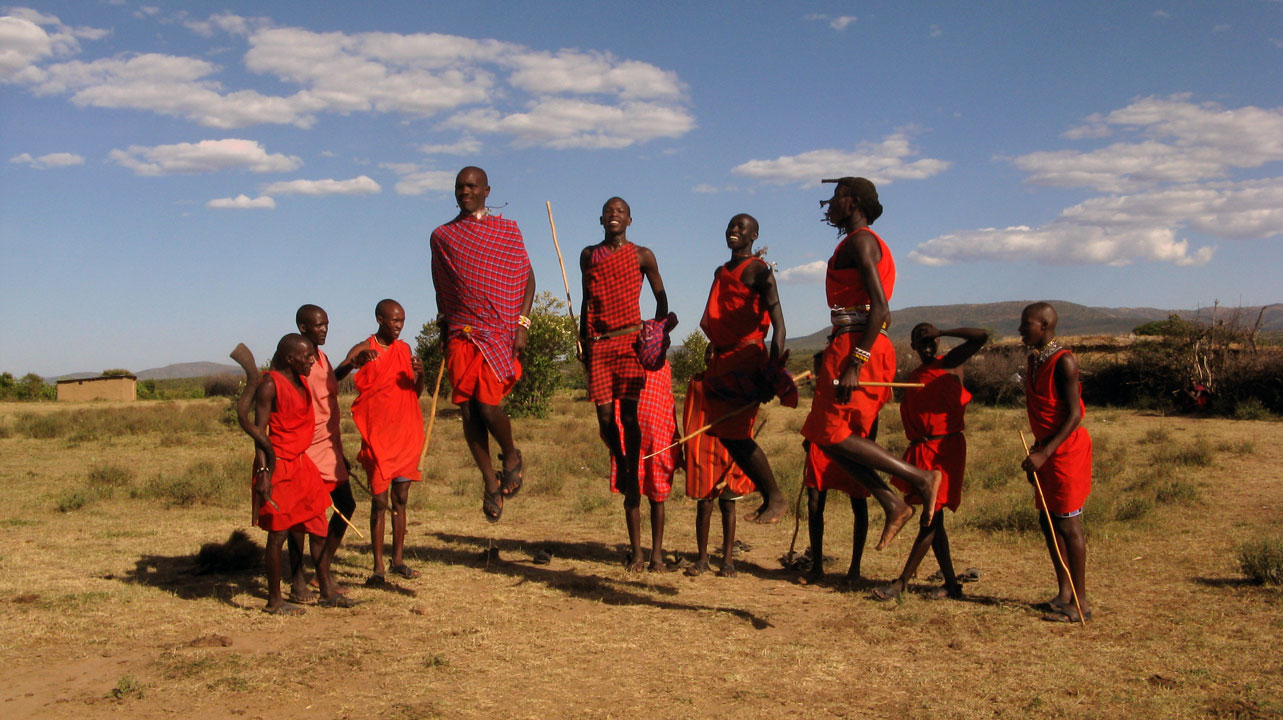
Maasai men perform adumu, the traditional jumping dance.

Rather than searching for food on a daily basis, members of a pastoral society rely on domesticated herd animals to meet their food needs. Pastoralists typically live a nomadic life, moving their herds from one pasture to another. Community size in pastoral societies is similar to hunter-gatherers (about 50 individuals), but unlike hunter-gatherers, pastoral societies usually consist of multiple communities—the average pastoral society contains thousands of people. This is because pastoral groups tend to live in open areas where movement is easy, which enables political integration. Pastoral societies tend to create a food surplus, and they have specialized labor and high levels of inequality.

==== Horticultural ====
Fruits and vegetables grown in garden plots that have been cleared from the jungle or forest provide the main source of food in a horticultural society. These societies have a similar level of technology and complexity to pastoral societies. Along with pastoral societies, horticultural societies emerged about 10,000 years ago, after technological changes of the Agricultural Revolution made it possible to cultivate crops and raise animals. Horticulturists use human labor and simple tools to cultivate the land for one or more seasons. When the land becomes barren, horticulturists clear a new plot and leave the old plot to revert to its natural state. They may return to the original land several years later and begin the process again. By rotating their garden plots, horticulturists can stay in one area for a long period of time. This allows them to build permanent or semi-permanent villages.

As with pastoral societies, surplus food leads to a more complex division of labor. Specialized roles in horticultural societies include craftspeople, shamans (religious leaders), and traders. This role specialization allows horticultural societies to create a variety of artifacts. Scarce, defensible resources can lead to wealth inequalities in horticultural political systems.

==== Agrarian ====
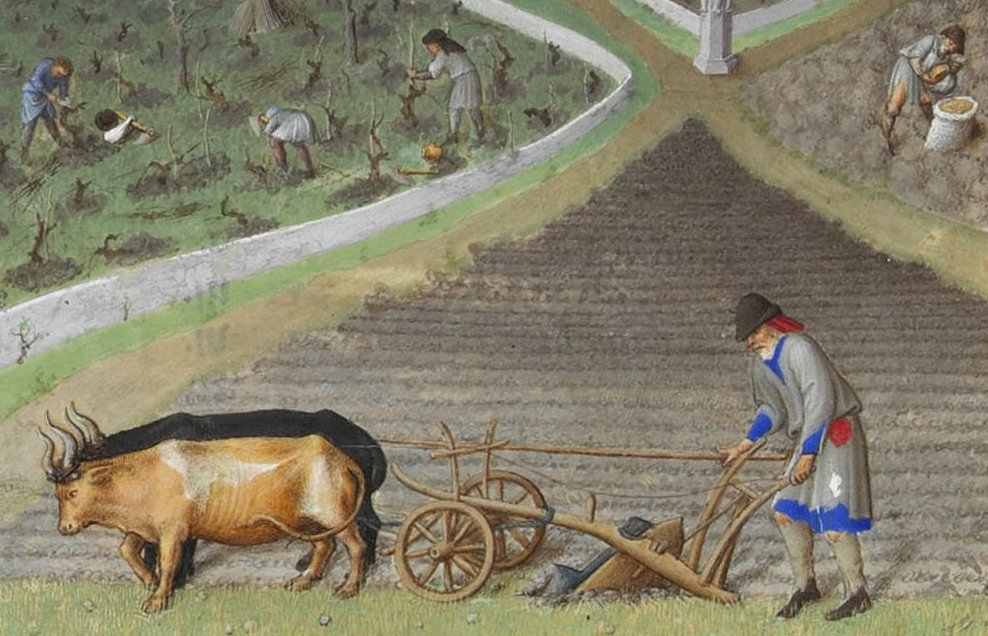
Plowing with oxen in the 15th century

Agrarian societies use agricultural technological advances to cultivate crops over a large area. Lenski differentiates between horticultural and agrarian societies by the use of the plow. Larger food supplies due to improved technology mean agrarian communities are larger than horticultural communities. A greater food surplus results in towns that become centers of trade. Economic trade in turn leads to increased specialization, including a ruling class, as well as educators, craftspeople, merchants, and religious figures, who do not directly participate in the production of food.

Agrarian societies are especially noted for their extremes of social classes and rigid social mobility. As land is the major source of wealth, social hierarchy develops based on landownership and not labor. The system of stratification is characterized by three coinciding contrasts: governing class versus the masses, urban minority versus peasant majority, and literate minority versus illiterate majority. This results in two distinct subcultures: the urban elite versus the peasant masses. Moreover, this means cultural differences within agrarian societies are greater than differences between them.

The landowning strata typically combine government, religious, and military institutions to justify and enforce their ownership, and support elaborate patterns of consumption; slavery, serfdom, or peonage is commonly the lot of the primary producer. Rulers of agrarian societies often do not manage their empire for the common good or in the name of the public interest, but as property they own. Caste systems, as historically found in South Asia, are associated with agrarian societies, where lifelong agricultural routines depend upon a rigid sense of duty and discipline. The scholar Donald Brown suggests that an emphasis in the modern West on personal liberties and freedoms was in large part a reaction to the steep and rigid stratification of agrarian societies.

=== Industrial ===
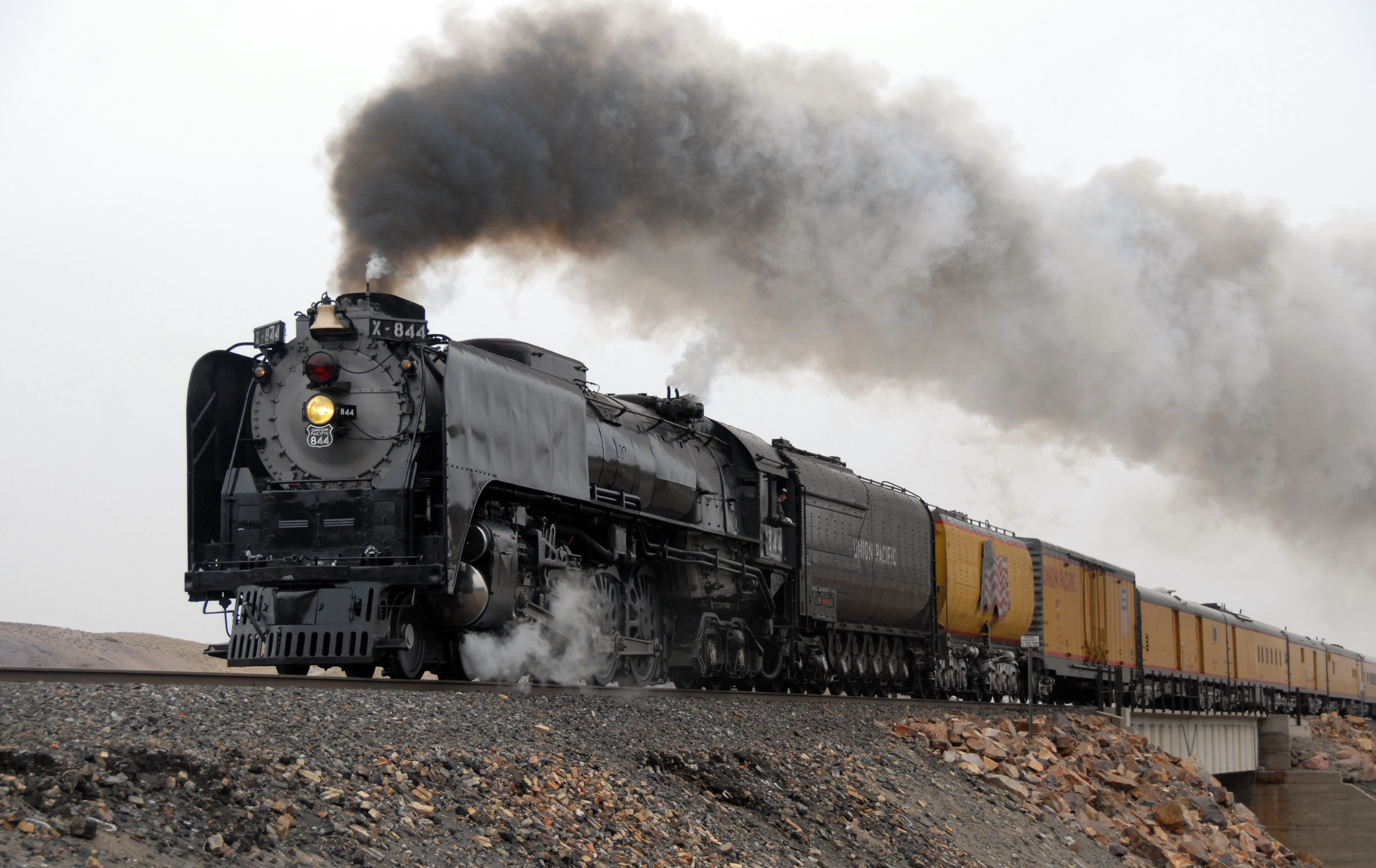
Industrial transportation, including trains, can stabilize the economy, leading to population growth.

Industrial societies, which emerged in the 18th century during the Industrial Revolution, rely heavily on machines powered by external sources for the mass production of goods. Whereas in pre-industrial societies the majority of labor takes place in primary industries focused on extracting raw materials (farming, fishing, mining, etc.), in industrial societies, labor is mostly focused on processing raw materials into finished products. Present-day societies vary in their degree of industrialization, with some using mostly newer energy sources (e.g., coal, oil, and nuclear energy), and others continuing to rely on human and animal power.

Industrialization is associated with population booms and the growth of cities. Increased productivity, as well as the stability caused by improved transportation, leads to decreased mortality and resulting population growth. Centralized production of goods in factories and a decreased need for agricultural labor lead to urbanization. Industrial societies are often capitalist, and they have high degrees of inequality along with high social mobility, as businesspeople use the market to amass large amounts of wealth. Working conditions in factories are generally restrictive and harsh. Workers, who have common interests, may organize into labor unions to advance those interests.

On the whole, industrial societies are marked by the increased power of human beings. Technological advancements mean that industrial societies have increased potential for deadly warfare. Governments use information technologies to exert greater control over the populace. Industrial societies also have an increased environmental impact.

=== Post-industrial ===
Post-industrial societies are societies dominated by information and services, rather than the production of goods. Advanced industrial societies see a shift toward an increase in service sectors, over manufacturing. Service industries include education, health, and finance.

==== Information ====
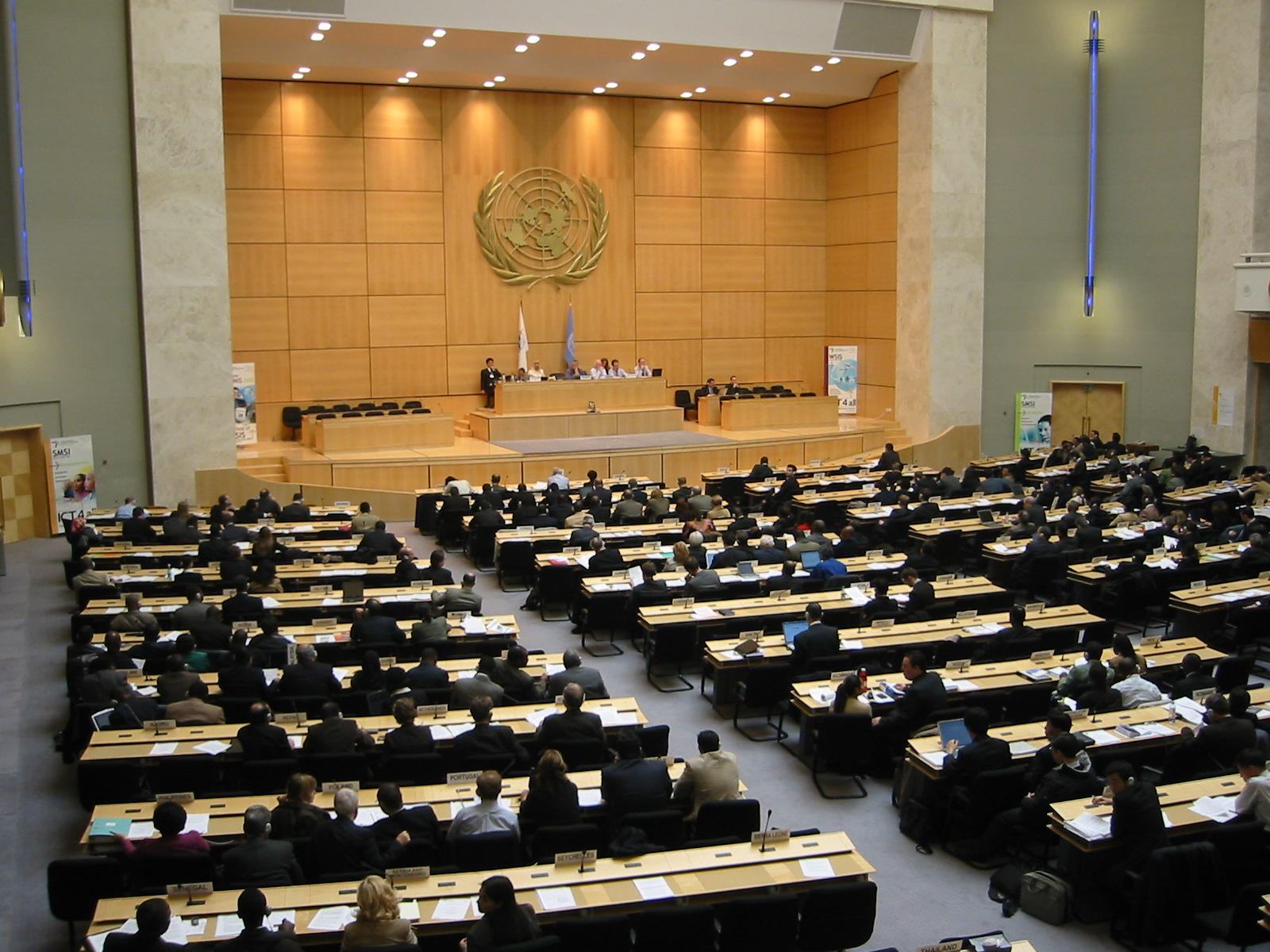
World Summit on the Information Society, Geneva

An information society is a society where the usage, creation, distribution, manipulation, and integration of information is a significant activity. Proponents of the idea that modern-day global society is an information society posit that information technologies are impacting most important forms of social organization, including education, economy, health, government, warfare, and levels of democracy. Although the concept of information society has been discussed since the 1930s, in the present day, it is almost always applied to ways that information technologies impact society and culture. It therefore covers the effects of computers and telecommunications on the home, the workplace, schools, government, and various communities and organizations, as well as the emergence of new social forms in cyberspace.

==== Knowledge ====
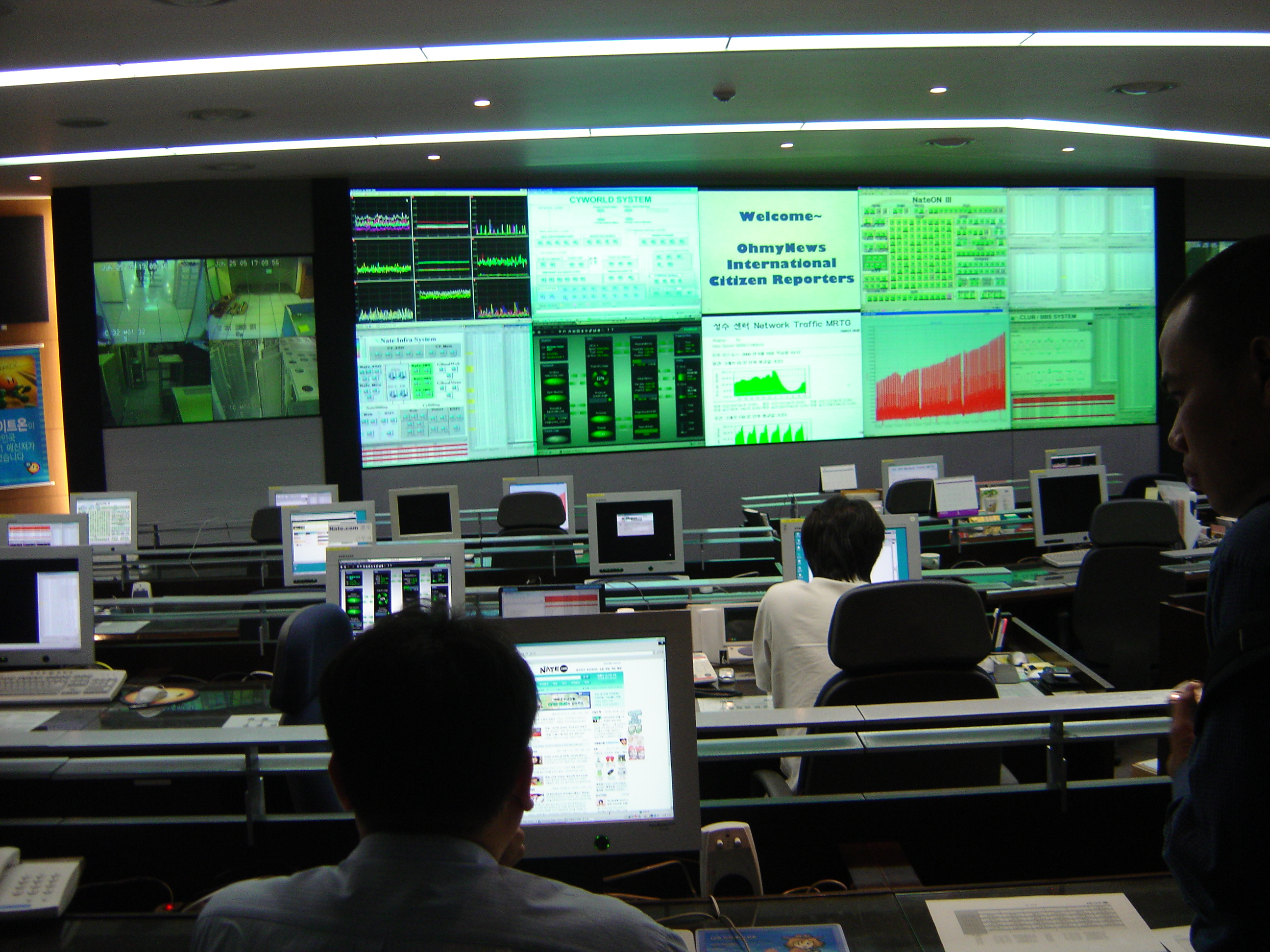
The Seoul Cyworld control room

As access to electronic information resources increased at the beginning of the 21st century, special attention was extended from the information society to the knowledge society. A knowledge society generates, shares, and makes available to all members of the society knowledge that may be used to improve the human condition. A knowledge society differs from an information society in that it transforms information into resources that allow society to take effective action, rather than only creating and disseminating raw data.

== Characteristics ==
=== Norms and roles ===
Social norms are shared standards of acceptable behavior by groups. Social norms—which can be both informal understandings that govern the behavior of members of a society, as well as be codified into rules and laws—are powerful drivers of human behavior.

Social roles are norms, duties, and patterns of behavior that relate to an individual's social status. In functionalist thought, individuals form the structure of society by occupying social roles. According to symbolic interactionism, individuals use symbols to navigate and communicate roles. Erving Goffman used the metaphor of a theater to develop the dramaturgical lens, which argues that roles provide scripts that govern social interactions.

=== Gender and kinship ===
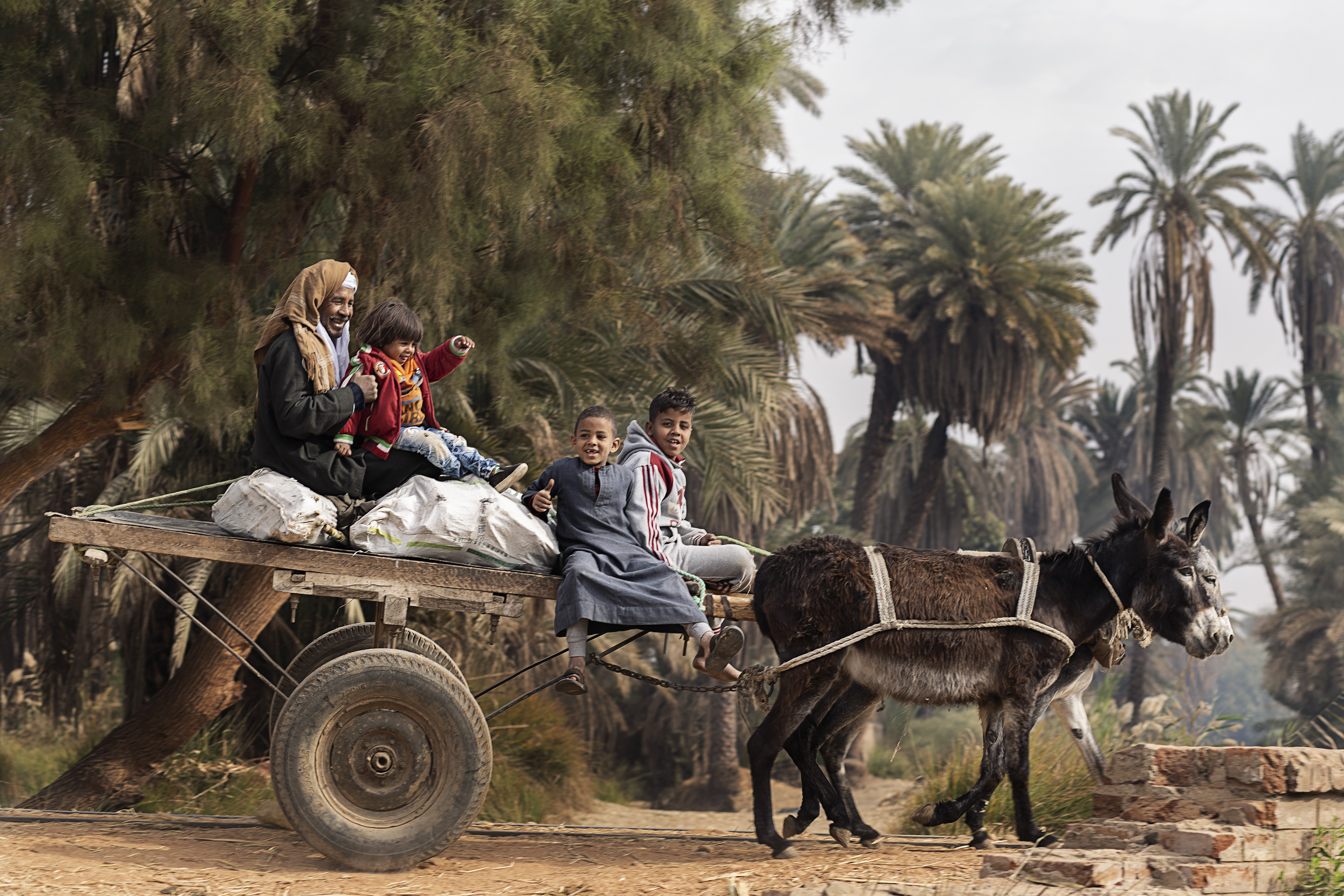
Egyptian family riding on a donkey-drawn cart in 2019. Familial relationships are one of the most important organizing principles in many societies.

The division of humans into male and female gender roles has been marked culturally by a corresponding division of norms, practices, dress, behavior, rights, duties, privileges, status, and power. Some argue that gender roles arise naturally from sex differences, which lead to a division of labor where women take on reproductive labor and other domestic roles. Gender roles have varied historically, and challenges to predominant gender norms have recurred in many societies.

All human societies organize, recognize, and classify types of social relationships based on relations between parents, children, and other descendants (consanguinity), and relations through marriage (affinity). There is also a third type of familial relationship applied to godparents or adoptive children (fictive). These culturally defined relationships are referred to as kinship. In many societies, it is one of the most important social organizing principles and plays a role in transmitting status and inheritance. All societies have rules of incest taboo, according to which marriage between certain kinds of kin relations is prohibited; and some societies also have rules of preferential marriage with certain other kin relations.

=== Ethnicity ===
Human ethnic groups are a social category that identify together as a group based on shared attributes that distinguish them from other groups. These shared attributes can be a common set of traditions, ancestry, language, history, society, culture, nation, religion, or social treatment within their residing area. There is no generally accepted definition of what constitutes an ethnic group, and humans have evolved the ability to change affiliation with social groups relatively easily, including leaving groups with previously strong alliances, if doing so is seen as providing personal advantages. Ethnicity is separate from the concept of race, which is based on physical characteristics, although both are socially constructed. Assigning ethnicity to a certain population is complicated, as even within common ethnic designations there can be a diverse range of subgroups, and the makeup of these ethnic groups can change over time at both the collective and individual level. Ethnic groupings can play a powerful role in the social identity and solidarity of ethnopolitical units. Ethnic identity has been closely tied to the rise of the nation state as the predominant form of political organization in the 19th and 20th centuries.

=== Government and politics ===
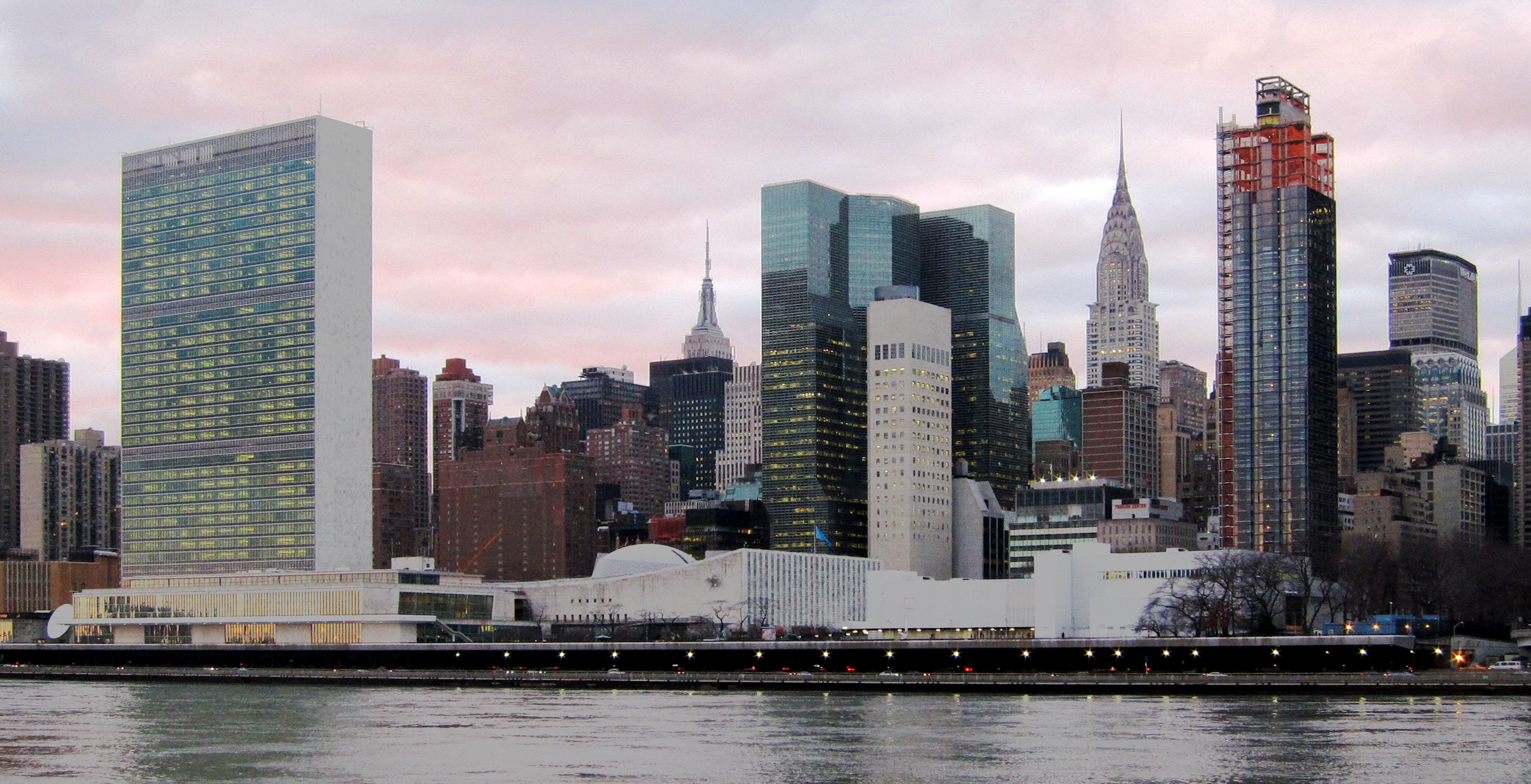
The United Nations headquarters in New York City, which houses one of the world's largest political organizations

Governments create laws and policies that affect the people that they govern. There have been many forms of government throughout human history, with various ways of allocating power, and with different levels and means of control over the population. In early history, distribution of political power was determined by the availability of fresh water, fertile soil, and temperate climate of different locations. As farming populations gathered in larger and denser communities, interactions between different groups increased, leading to the further development of governance within and between communities.

As of 2022, according to The Economist, 43% of national governments were democracies, 35% autocracies, and 22% containing elements of both. Many countries have formed international political organizations and alliances, the largest being the United Nations with 193 member states.

=== Trade and economics ===
Long-distance spice trade routes along the Silk Road (green) and other routes (red) circa 1st century AD

Trade, the voluntary exchange of goods and services, has long been an aspect of human societies, and it is seen as a characteristic that differentiates humans from other animals. Trade has even been cited as a practice that gave Homo sapiens a major advantage over other hominids; evidence suggests early H. sapiens made use of long-distance trade routes to exchange goods and ideas, leading to cultural explosions and providing additional food sources when hunting was sparse. Such trade networks did not exist for the now-extinct Neanderthals. Early trade involved materials for creating tools, like obsidian, exchanged over short distances. In contrast, throughout antiquity and the medieval period, some of the most influential long-distance routes carried food and luxury goods, such as the spice trade.

Early human economies were more likely to be based around gift-giving than a bartering system. Early money consisted of commodities; the oldest being in the form of cattle and the most widely used being cowrie shells. Money has since evolved into government-issued coins, paper, and electronic money. Human study of economics is a social science that looks at how societies distribute scarce resources among different people. There are massive inequalities in the division of wealth among humans; as of 2018 in China, Europe, and the United States, the richest tenth of humans hold more than seven-tenths of those regions' total wealth.

=== Conflict ===
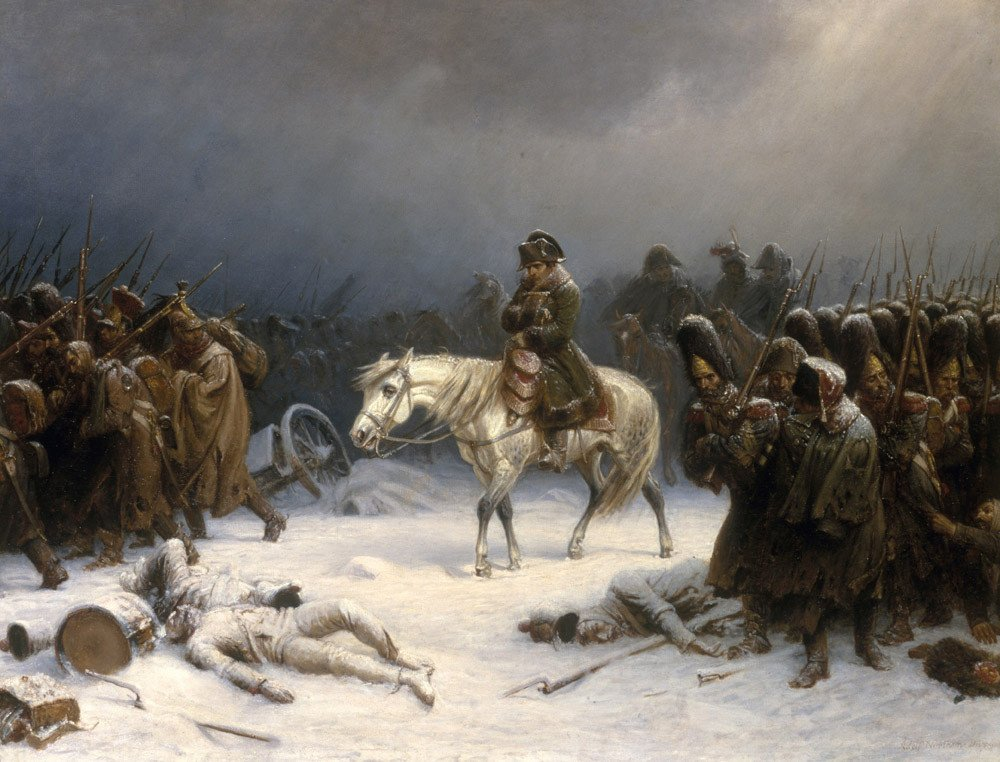
Napoleon's retreat after his failed invasion of Russia in 1812 (oil painting by Adolph Northen, 1851)

The willingness of humans to kill other members of their species en masse through organized conflict (i.e., war) has long been the subject of debate. One school of thought is that war evolved as a means to eliminate competitors, and that violence is an innate human characteristic. Humans commit violence against other humans at a rate comparable to other primates (although humans kill adults at a relatively high rate and have a relatively low rate of infanticide).

Another school of thought suggests that war is a relatively recent phenomenon and appeared due to changing social conditions. While not settled, the current evidence suggests warlike behavior only became common about 10,000 years ago, and in many regions even more recently.

Phylogenetic analysis predicts 2% of human deaths to be caused by homicide, which approximately matches the rate of homicide in band societies. However, rates of violence vary widely according to societal norms, and rates of homicide in societies that have legal systems and strong cultural attitudes against violence stand at about 0.01%.

== See also ==
- Civil society
- Consumerism
- Group cohesiveness
- High society
- Learned society
- Mass society
- Open society
- Outline of sociology
  - Outline of society
    - Outline of community
    - Outline of culture
    - Outline of religion
- People
- Professional association
- Reciprocal altruism
- Secret society
- Social construct
- Social cue
- Social issues
- Social media
- Social network
- Social networking service
- Social neuroscience
- Social pension
- Social psychology
- Social skills
- Social studies
- Social support
- Social undermining
- Social work
- Societal collapse
- Societal effects of cars
- Sociobiology
- Sociology
- Structure and agency
