= GCM2 =

Protein-coding gene in the species Homo sapiens

Identifiers
- Aliases: GCM2, GCMB, hGCMb, glial cells missing homolog 2, HRPT4, glial cells missing transcription factor 2, FIH2
- External IDs: OMIM: 603716; MGI: 1861438; GeneCards: GCM2

Gene location (Human)
Chr.	Chromosome 6 (human)
Band	6p24.2	Start	10,873,223 bp
Band	6p24.2	End	10,882,041 bp

Gene location (Mouse)
Chr.	Chromosome 13 (mouse)
Band	13|13 A3.3	Start	41,254,903 bp
Band	13|13 A3.3	End	41,264,511 bp
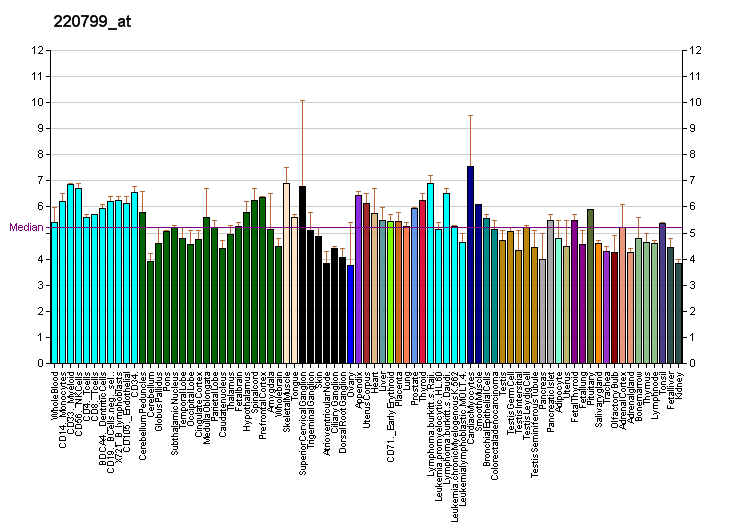
RNA expression pattern
Bgee	Human / Mouse (ortholog); Top expressed in: testicle; embryo; sperm; ganglionic eminence; left testis; right testis; stomach; body of stomach / Top expressed in: secondary oocyte; zygote; primary oocyte; urethra; male urethra; Ileal epithelium; parathyroid; piriform cortex; primary motor cortex; inferior colliculi; More reference expression data
BioGPS	More reference expression data
Gene ontology
Molecular function	DNA binding; protein binding; metal ion binding; DNA-binding transcription activator activity, RNA polymerase II-specific; sequence-specific DNA binding; DNA-binding transcription factor activity, RNA polymerase II-specific
Cellular component	nucleus
Biological process	transcription, DNA-templated; parathyroid gland development; cellular phosphate ion homeostasis; regulation of transcription, DNA-templated; cellular calcium ion homeostasis; multicellular organism development; gliogenesis; positive regulation of transcription by RNA polymerase II; cell differentiation involved in embryonic placenta development; regulation of transcription by RNA polymerase II; transcription by RNA polymerase II
Sources:Amigo / QuickGO
Orthologs
Databases	NCBI: entry; OMA: entry
Species	Human	Mouse
Entrez	9247	107889
Ensembl	ENSG00000124827	ENSMUSG00000021362
UniProt	O75603	O09102
RefSeq (mRNA)	NM_004752	NM_008104
RefSeq (protein)	NP_004743	NP_032130
Location (UCSC)	Chr 6: 10.87 – 10.88 Mb	Chr 13: 41.25 – 41.26 Mb
PubMed search
- Wikidata
View/Edit Human	View/Edit Mouse

Chorion-specific transcription factor GCMb is a protein that in humans is encoded by the GCM2 gene.

The Drosophila 'glial cells missing' (gcm) gene is thought to act as a binary switch between neuronal and glial cell determination. The gcm protein and mammalian gcm homologs contain a conserved N-terminal gcm motif that has DNA-binding activity. See GCM1 (MIM 603715).[supplied by OMIM]
