= Pre-industrial society =

Societies before industrialization

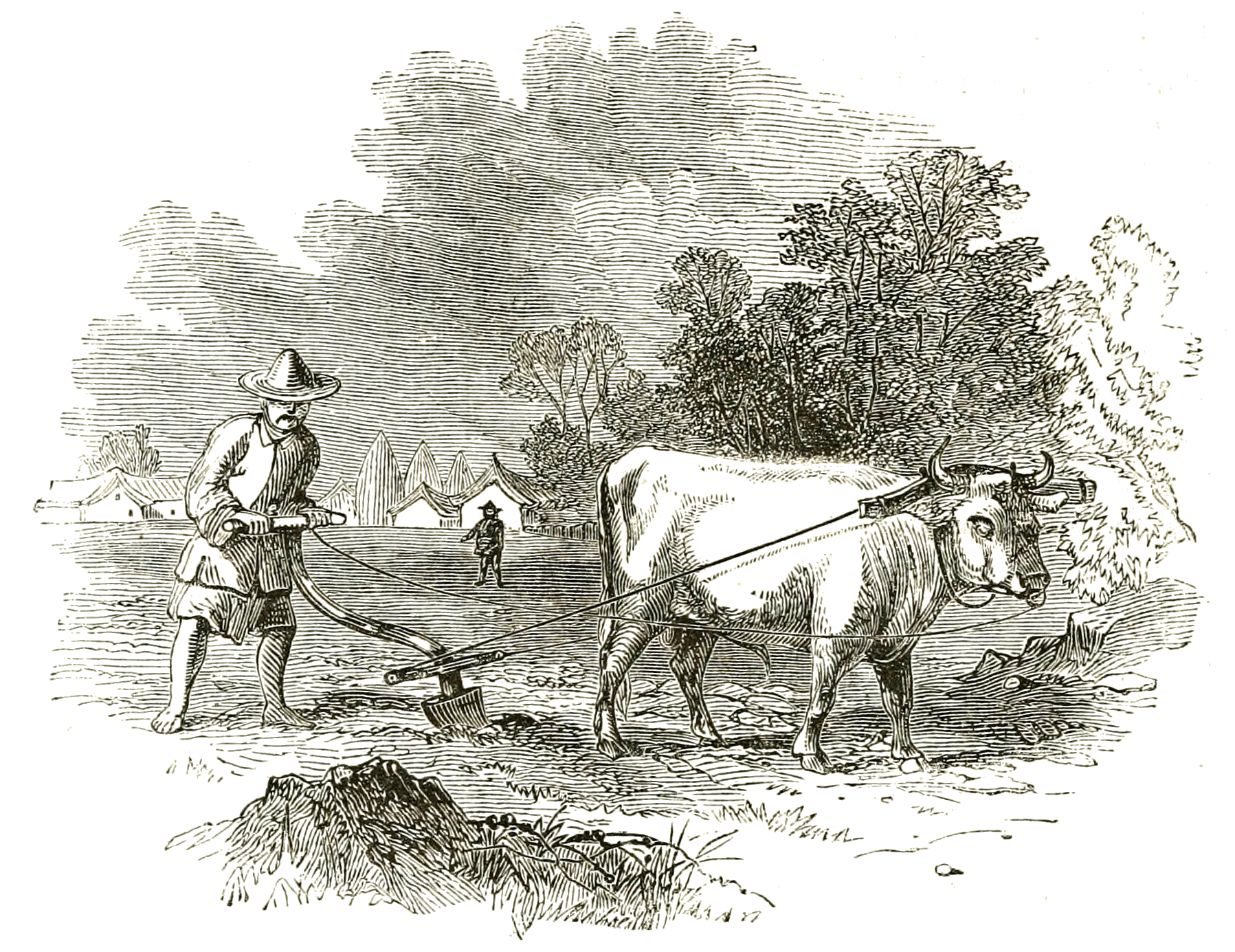
"Tartar Agriculturalist": A Chinese farmer using an ox to pull a scratch plow

Pre-industrial society refers to social attributes and forms of political and cultural organization that were prevalent before the advent of the Industrial Revolution, which occurred from 1750 to 1850. Pre-industrial refers to a time before there were machines and tools to help perform tasks en masse. Pre-industrial civilization dates back to centuries ago, but the main era known as the pre-industrial society occurred right before the industrial society. Pre-Industrial societies vary from region to region depending on the culture of a given area or history of social and political life. Europe was known for its feudal system and the Italian Renaissance.

The term "pre-industrial" is also used as a benchmark for environmental conditions before the development of industrial society: for example, the Paris Agreement, adopted in Paris on 12 December, 2015 and in force from 4 November, 2016, "aims to limit global warming to well below 2, preferably to 1.5 degrees celsius, compared to pre-industrial levels." The date for the end of the "pre-industrial era" is not defined.

== Common attributes ==
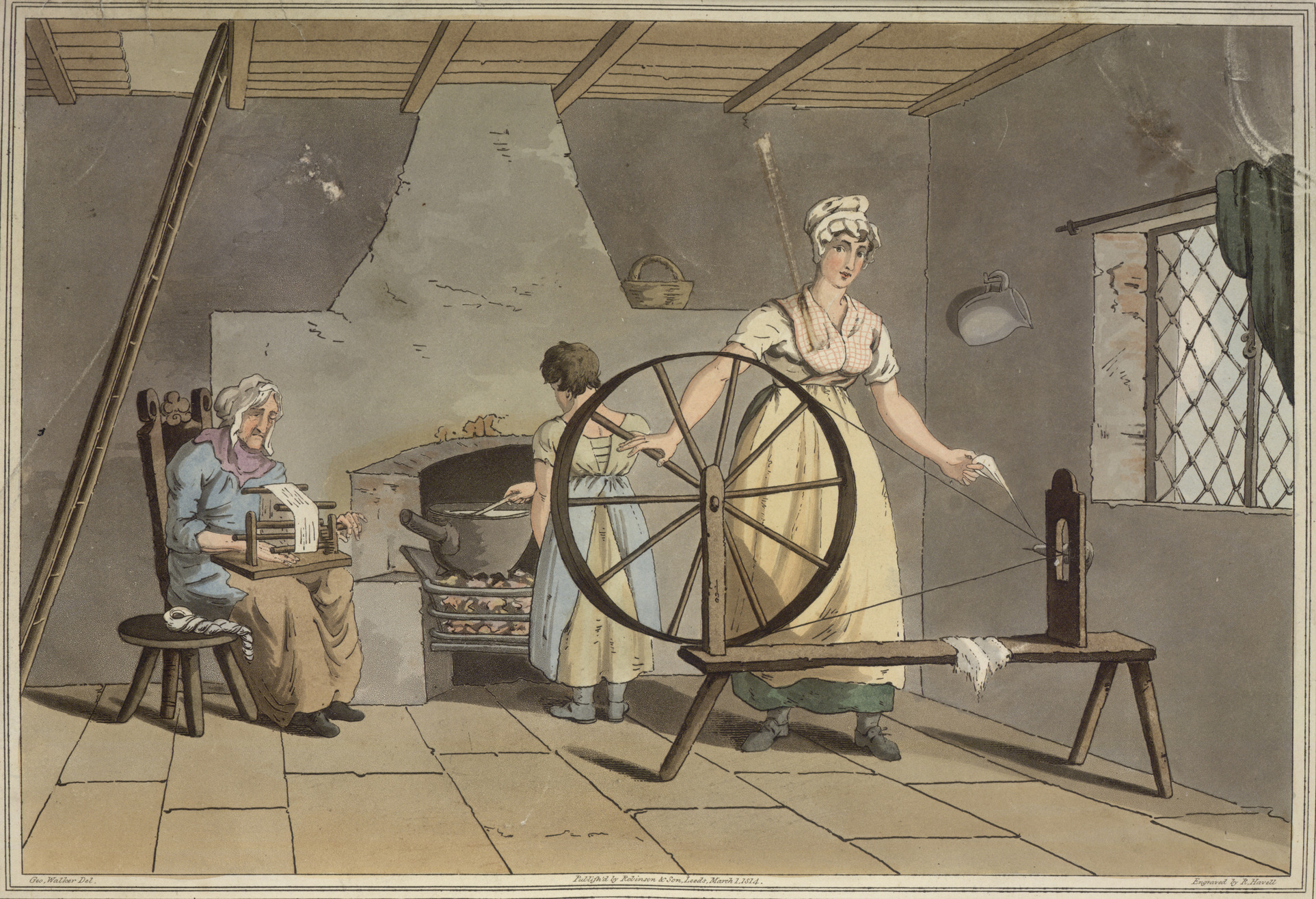
George Walker, 1814

- Limited production
- Extreme agricultural economy
- Limited division of labor. In pre-industrial societies, production was relatively simple and the number of specialized crafts was limited.
- Limited variation of social classes
- Parochialism—Communications were limited between communities in pre-industrial societies. Few had the opportunity to see or hear beyond their own village. Industrial societies grew with the help of faster means of communication, having more information at hand about the world, allowing knowledge transfer and cultural diffusion between them.
- Populations grew at substantial rates
- Social classes: peasants and lords
- Subsistence level of living
- Population dependent on peasants for food
- People were located in villages rather than in cities
- A large amount of the population is peasants (usually around 98%)

== Economic systems ==
- Barter economy
- Chattel economy
- Cefeng system
- Gift economy
- Hunter gather society
- Imperialism
- Mandala
- Manorialism
- Mercantilism
- Merchant capitalism
- Iqta'
- Palace economy
- Planned economy
- Subsistence agriculture
- Subsistence
- Traditional economy

=== Labor conditions ===
Harsh working conditions had been prevalent long before the Industrial Revolution took place, especially for slaves. Pre-industrial society was very static, with child labour and dirty living conditions being common. However, long working hours were not as equally prevalent before the Industrial Revolution.

== Health Issues ==
Health issues were very prevalent during the Pre-Industrial era largely due to the low access to healthcare systems and treatment available affecting the lower class of society in particular.

== Causes of death ==
=== Homicide ===
Trends show that homicide rates in Europe between the years of 1800 and 1850 in nations like Italy are around 75-80 people per every 100,000.

=== Famine ===
In early modern Europe, famines led to significant fatalities and long lasting impacts. However, during the pre-industrial era it had less of an impact due to the development of food storage and commercial trade between the population.

=== Epidemics ===
==== Plague ====
Plague epidemics were greatly less common with nearly zero recorded in Europe and the Middle-east during the years of 1840 and 1890 as oppose to 130 reported cases in the early 1600's.

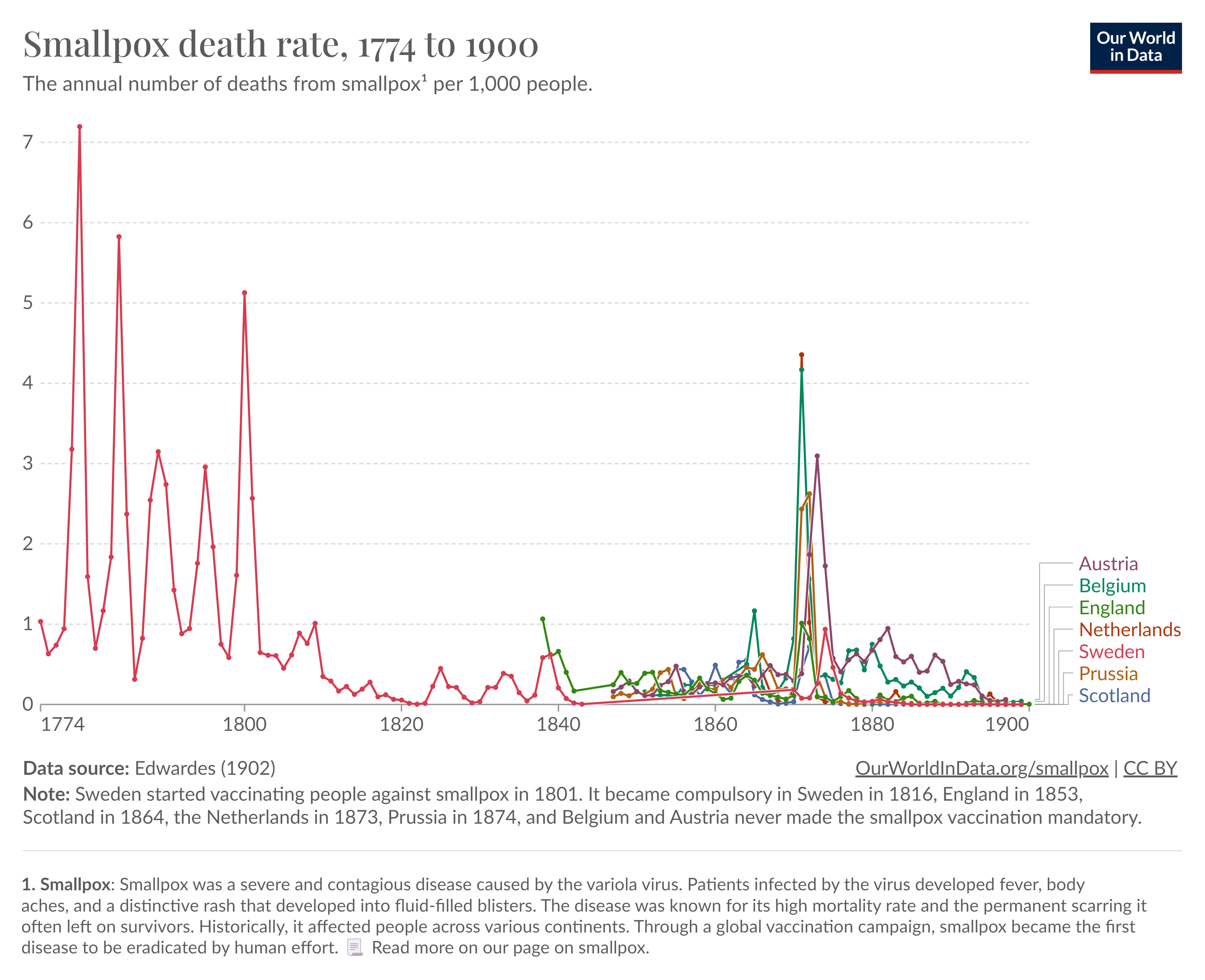
Graph representing the reduced amount of smallpox deaths per 100,000 people.

==== Smallpox ====
Smallpox outbreaks typically lasted from 5-15 years based on population sized. It was a disease mostly affecting children and lead to high fever, septicemia and extensive bleeding resulting in a large amount of fatality. Statistics show that mortality per 100,000 people from smallpox dropped significantly from 1781 through to 1850 to around 25 deaths in most European countries.

== See also ==
- Agrarian society
- Industrialisation
- Modernization theory
- Traditional society
- Dependency Theory
- Imperialism
- Hunter gatherers
- Low technology
- Transhumance
- Nomads
- Pastoral nomads
- Post-industrial society
- Proto-industrialization

== Bibliography ==
- Grinin, L. 2007. Periodization of History: A theoretic-mathematical analysis. In: History & Mathematics. Ed. by Leonid Grinin, Victor de Munck, and Andrey Korotayev. Moscow: KomKniga/URSS. P.10-38. ISBN 978-5-484-01001-1.
