= Bill Hansen (scientist) =

American scientist (born 1949)

William Bunker Hansen
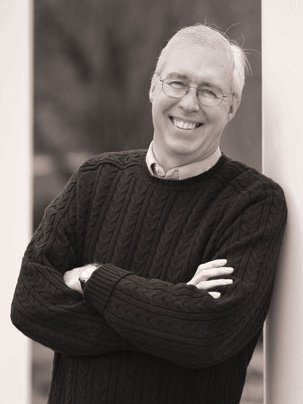
- Photo of Hansen taken in North Carolina in 2013.
- Born: November 15, 1949 (age 76); Vernal, Utah
- Other name: Bill Hansen
- Spouse: Kathleen Marrie Bowen
- Children: 5
- Awards: Society for Prevention Research: Prevention Science to Practice Award, Fellow
- Scientific career
- Fields: Prevention Science; Social Psychology
- Workplaces: Prevention Strategies (2016-present); University of North Carolina at Greensboro (2004-present); Tanglewood Research (1993-2016); Wake Forest School of Medicine (1989-1996); University of Southern California (1985-1989); University of California, Los Angeles (1978-1985)

William Bunker Hansen (born November 15, 1949) is a researcher in the field of prevention science. He was a charter member and a vice president of the Society for Prevention Research. In 1993 he founded Tanglewood Research. He has authored over 40 versions of alcohol, tobacco, and other substance abuse prevention programs, most notably the All Stars (Prevention) series of prevention programs.

== Research ==
=== Preventive Interventions ===
Hansen's notable contribution to science has been the development of school-based prevention programs. His program development approach focuses on longitudinal statistical mediators and devising strategies for altering normal developmental processes. Projects on which he played the role of primary intervention developer include the Houston Smoking Prevention Project (1974-1978), Project SMART (1980-1985), the Tobacco and Alcohol Prevention Project (1981-1986), the Adolescent Alcohol Prevention Trial (1984-1992), the Midwestern Prevention Project (1985-1992), and projects related to the development of All Stars (Prevention) (1996–present). In recognition of these contributions, the Society for Prevention Research awarded him the Prevention Research to Practice Award in 2001.

=== Theories that undergird prevention ===
Prevention science relies on several basic assumptions about the relations between mediators and behavioral outcomes. Hansen proposed two laws that undergird prevention program effectiveness:

1. The law of mediated effects (all outcomes are achieved indirectly through the modification of mediators, be they psychological, sociological, economic, biological, or environmental)
2. The law of maximum expected potential effect (all outcomes are limited by the strength of statistical relation that a mediator has with a target behavior with statistically strong mediators having the most promise as a target of intervention)

=== Evaluation tools ===
He was funded in 1995 to develop standardized measurement modules for evaluating prevention programs. He chaired a SAMHSA committee to develop standardized survey tools for use by prevention scientists. His own research resulted in the development of Evaluation Lizard, which is a system for collecting and evaluating pretest and posttest surveys. This research was supplemented in 2008 to develop a method for using synthetic comparators. He is currently directing the development of Virtual Controls, a strategy to evaluate disseminated prevention programs when randomization is not possible and recruitment of comparison sites is challenging

=== Assessing quality of implementation ===
Hansen was among the first drug prevention researchers to acknowledge that quality of implementation (often referred to as fidelity) was a key moderator of the success of intervention efforts. In the past decade, he and his colleagues have developed systematic strategies for assessing quality of delivery, including a rubric for assessing adaptations that teachers make when delivering interventions in real world settings. Fidelity assessment tools have been built into Evaluation Lizard and Virtual Controls as an option available to users.

=== Etiological research ===
Prior to the development of interventions, the field needs to understand normative development of drug use and other closely intertwined problem behaviors. While this has not been a primary focus of his research, he has nonetheless published several empirical studies that have directly influenced the development of the prevention programs. Early studies were embedded in prevention program evaluation research projects. Later research was funded as part of a study to look at predictors of the onset of drug in grades 6th-12th grades.
