= John Lochman =

American clinical psychologist

John E. Lochman
- Occupation: Clinical psychologist
- Known for: Coping Power Program, childhood aggression research

Academic background
- Education: Purdue University (BS), University of Connecticut (MA, PhD)

John E. Lochman is an American clinical psychologist known for his influential work on childhood aggression and the development of evidence-based preventive interventions. He is Saxon Professor Emeritus of Psychology at the University of Alabama and has contributed extensively to prevention science, clinical child psychology, and behavioral intervention programs for at-risk youth.

== Early life and education ==
Lochman earned his Bachelor of Science in Psychology from Purdue University in 1971. He received both his master's degree (1973) and Ph.D. (1977) in clinical psychology from the University of Connecticut.

== Academic career ==
Lochman began his academic career at the University of Texas Health Science Center at Dallas (1977–1980) and then joined Duke University, where he served from 1980 to 1998 in the Department of Psychiatry and Behavioral Sciences. During his time at Duke, he directed community-based programs addressing oppositional defiant disorder and conduct disorder in youth. It was here that he co-developed the "Anger Coping Program," a cognitive-behavioral intervention for elementary-aged children.

In 1998, Lochman joined the University of Alabama as the Saxon Professor and Doddridge Saxon Chair in Clinical Psychology. He also served as the founding Director of the university’s Center for Prevention of Youth Behavior Problems, now known as the Center for Youth Development and Intervention. In addition, he served as Interim Director of the Alabama Life Research Institute and maintained an adjunct faculty position at Duke University.

== Research and contributions ==
Lochman has authored or co-authored over 475 scholarly publications and has led or collaborated on numerous large-scale research initiatives. His work focuses on the development, evaluation, and dissemination of cognitive-behavioral interventions for children exhibiting disruptive and aggressive behavior. His research interests include:

- Emotion regulation and social problem-solving in children
- School- and community-based intervention programs
- Longitudinal studies of conduct disorder and adolescent outcomes
- Implementation science and program adaptation across cultures

He is best known for developing the Coping Power Program, a school-based preventive intervention for late elementary-aged children, derived from his earlier Anger Coping model.

Lochman also played a key role in the Fast Track Program, a major longitudinal study designed to prevent serious conduct problems in high-risk children.

== Editorial and professional service ==
Lochman served as Editor-in-Chief of the Journal of Abnormal Child Psychology and as an Associate Editor for Behavior Therapy. He held editorial board positions on journals including the Journal of Consulting and Clinical Psychology and served on national grant review panels for the National Institutes of Health (NIH).

He also served as President of the American Psychological Association’s Division 37 (Society for Child and Family Policy and Practice) and of the American Board of Clinical Child and Adolescent Psychology.

== Awards and honors ==
- Doctor Honoris Causa, Utrecht University (2004)
- Distinguished Career Award, APA Division 53 (2011)
- Award for Distinguished Service, American Board of Professional Psychology (2014)
- Burnum Distinguished Faculty Award, University of Alabama (2008)
- Buford Peace Award, University of Alabama (2019)
- Moody Outstanding Professor, University of Alabama (2005)

Lochman is a Fellow of the American Psychological Association, the Society for Prevention Research, the Association for Psychological Science, and the Academy of Cognitive Therapy.

In 2019, the "John E. Lochman Endowed Graduate Scholarship in Psychology" was established at the University of Alabama to support students researching prevention and intervention strategies in clinical child psychology. The fund was initiated by Lochman and his wife, Linda Lochman.

== Selected publications ==
- Lochman, John E.; Vernberg, Eric; Glenn, Andrea; Jarrett, Matt; McDonald, Kristina; Powell, Nicole (2021). "Effects of autonomic nervous system functioning and tornado exposure on long-term outcomes of aggressive children". Research on Child and Adolescent Psychopathology. 49 (4): 471–489. doi:10.1007/s10802-020-00753-1. PMC 7987880. PMID 33433778.
- Dillon, Courtney; Lochman, John E. (2022). "Correcting for norm misperception of anti-bullying attitudes". International Journal of Behavioral Development. 46 (5): 443–452. doi:10.1177/0165025419860598.
- Levantini, Valentina; Powe, Cameron; Lochman, John; Glenn, Andrea (2022). "Monoamine Oxidase-A and conduct problems in children: The role of affective decision-making". Journal of Psychopathology and Behavioral Assessment. 44: 227–234. doi:10.1007/s10862-021-09917-9.
- Lochman, John E. (2022). "Open science and intervention research". Prevention Science. 23 (5): 844–851. doi:10.1007/s11121-021-01219-6.
- Lochman, John E.; Laird, Robert; McDaniel, Heather; Boxmeyer, Caroline; Braun, Summer (2024). "Intervention format and therapeutic alliance". Journal of Consulting and Clinical Psychology. 92 (1): 26–43. doi:10.1037/ccp0000841. PMC 10840890. PMID 37768632.
- Saavedra, Laura M.; Lochman, John E.; Morgan-Lopez, Antonio; McDaniel, Heather (2025). "Collateral effects of Coping Power on caregivers". Development and Psychopathology. 37: 94–106. doi:10.1017/S095457942300144X. PMID 38179693.
- Heilman, Meagan; Lochman, John E.; Laird, Robert; McDonald, Kristina (2025). "Peer acceptance and preventive intervention outcomes". Prevention Science. 26 (4): 621–632. doi:10.1007/s11121-025-01767-1. PMID 39806163.
- McDaniel, Heather; Budavari, Alexa; Tonigan, Alexandra; Lochman, John E. (2025). "Preventing suicidal behaviors among youth". JAACAP Open. doi:10.1016/j.jaacop.2025.01.005.
