= Kenneth A. Dodge =

American academic

Kenneth Dodge
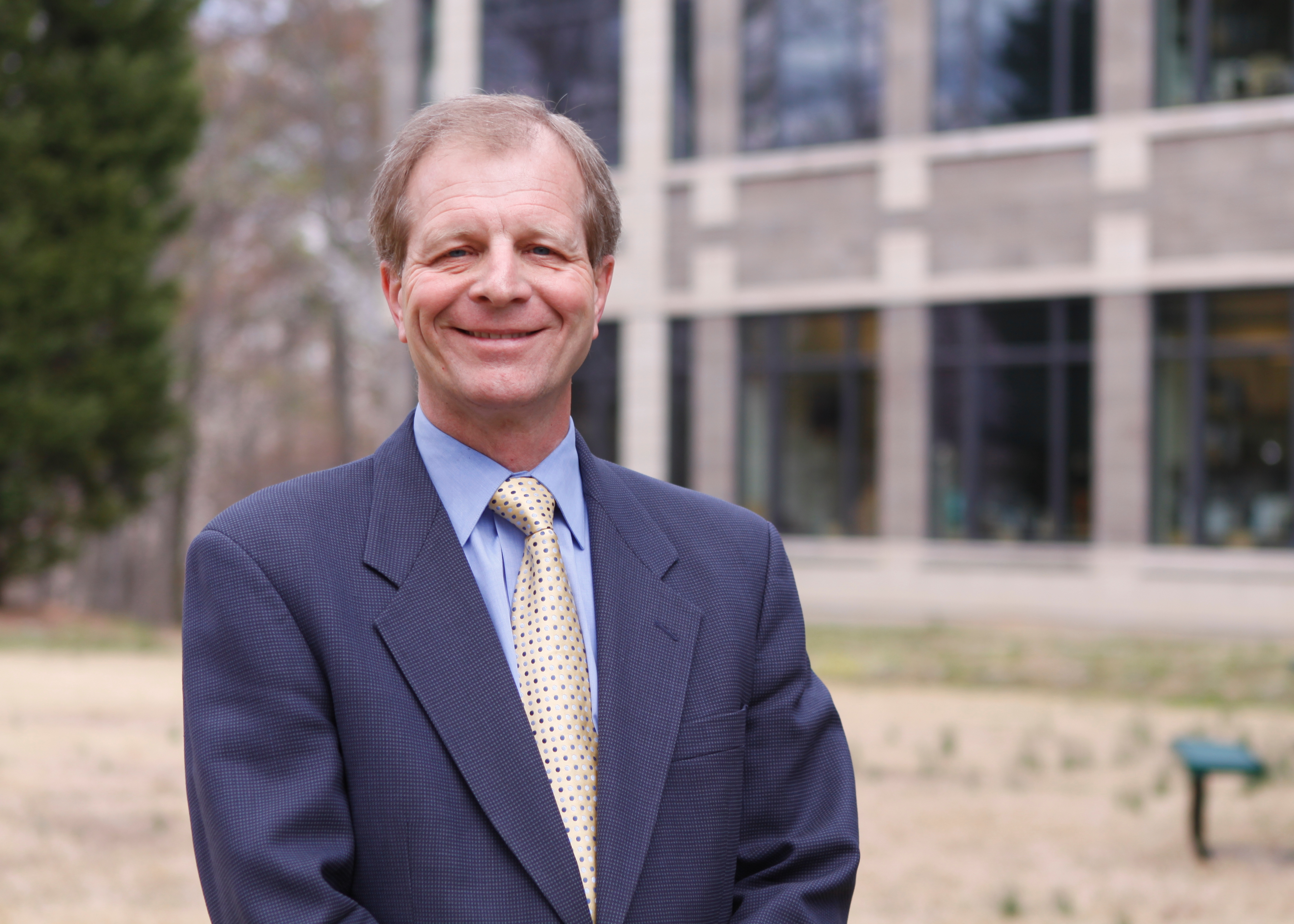
- Born: July 20, 1954 (age 72)
- Education: Northwestern University, B.A., Psychology, 1975; Duke University, Ph.D., Psychology, 1978
- Occupations: Professor of psychology and neuroscience
- Employer: Duke University
- Spouse: Claudia Jones
- Website: sanford.duke.edu/people/faculty/dodge-kenneth

Kenneth Dodge is the William McDougall Distinguished Professor of Public Policy and Professor of Psychology and Neuroscience at Duke University. He is also the founding and past director of the Duke University Center for Child and Family Policy and founder of Family Connects International.

== Background ==
Dodge was born on July 20, 1954, and grew up in Chicago, Illinois. He completed his undergraduate degree in psychology at Northwestern University in 1975 and his Ph.D. in psychology at Duke University in 1978.

== Career ==
Dodge, a clinical and developmental psychologist, is a widely cited expert on the development, prevention and policy of aggressive behavior and chronic violence in children. He is recognized for transforming school-based interventions to improve children's social competence and early childhood interventions to prevent child abuse and promote early child development. Through his research, Dodge concluded that early physical abuse can result in biased patterns of social information processing in children, and in subsequent aggressive behavior and school failure. Based on these findings, Dodge and his colleagues established the Fast Track Project, a comprehensive program designed to prevent young adult chronic violence by working with high-risk children to develop their academic and social skills. He was also instrumental in creating Family Connects, a community-wide program to prevent child abuse and promote young children's school readiness by providing free in-home nurse visits to all infants and their families. Piloted in Durham County, North Carolina., the program has been evaluated in two randomized controlled trials and a field experiment. Results include: decreased infant emergency medical care in a child's first year of life, decreased mother's anxiety, and decreased child maltreatment investigations.

Dodge has published more than 500 scientific articles, and is among the most highly cited developmental psychologists in the world. In 2003, he was recognized by the Web of Science as being among the top 0.5 percent of “Most Highly-Cited Scientists”. Dodge was elected to the National Academy of Medicine in 2015. Dodge serves on the editorial board for the journals Clinical Psychological Science, Parenting: Science and Practice, and Aggressive Behavior. Prior to arriving at Duke, Dodge served on the faculties of Indiana University, the University of Colorado and Vanderbilt University.

== Selected service committees ==
- President, Society for Research in Child Development (2019–2021)
- President-elect, Society for Research in Child Development (2017–2019)
- Member, Panel on the Working Class, Brookings Institution and America Enterprise Institute (2017–)
- Member, advisory board, Weiss Institute (2017–2019)
- Member, advisory board, Frank Porter Graham Child Development Institute, University of North Carolina (2017–)
- Member, council of directors, International Society for Research on Aggression (2016–)
- Member, American Psychological Association Task Force on Violent Media (2013– )
- Member, board of directors, North Carolina Early Childhood Foundation (2013– )
- Elected Member, Board of directors of the Society for Prevention Research (2012– )
- Elected member, Governing Council for the Society for Research in Child Development (2011–2017)
- Co-author, Brief of Amici Curiae to the United States Supreme Court on Behalf of Petitioners, Evan Miller v. State of Alabama, Kuntrell Jackson v. State of Arkansas (January 2012)
- Member, scientific advisory board, America's Promise (2004–2016)

== Awards ==
- 1984 Distinguished Scientific Award for Early Career Contribution, American Psychological Association
- 1985 Boyd McCandless Award for Scientific Contribution to Developmental Psychology
- 2002-2013 Senior Scientist Award, NIDA
- 2003 Most Highly Cited Scientist, Institute for Scientific Information, Web of Science
- 2003 Fellow, American Association for the Advancement of Science
- 2010 The Science to Practice Award, Society for Prevention Research
  2009 Fellow, Society for Experimental Social Psychology
- 2012 J.P. Scott Award for Lifetime Contribution to Aggression Research, International Society for Research on Aggression
- 2014 Recipient, Inaugural "Public Service Matters" Spotlight Award, Network of Schools of Public Policy, Affairs, and Administration
- 2016 Winner of the 2016 Families and Health Section Outstanding Professional Publications Award from the National Council on Family Relations
- 2016 Recipient, Inaugural Presidential Citation Award for Excellence in Research from the Society for Research in Adolescence
- 2016 Distinguished Scientist of the Year, Child Mind Institute
- 2016 Inducted into the National Academy of Medicine
- 2017 Service to Society for Prevention Research Award
- 2018 APA Distinguished Scientific Award for the Applications of Psychology

== Selected works ==
- Muschkin, C.G.; Ladd, H.F.; Dodge, K.A.; Bai, Y. (2020). "Gender Differences in the Impact of North Carolina's Early Care and Education Initiatives on Student Outcomes in Elementary School". Educational Policy. 34 (2): 377–407. doi:10.1177/0895904818773901.
- Dodge, K.A.; Goodman, Y. O'Donnell; Bai, W.B.; Murphy, R.A. (2019). "Effect of a Community Agency-Administered Nurse Home Visitation Program on Program Use and Maternal and Infant Health Outcomes: A Randomized Clinical Trial". JAMA Network Open. 2 (11): e1914522. doi:10.1001/jamanetworkopen.2019.14522. PMC 6826644. PMID 31675088.
- Dodge, K.A. (2019). "Redefining the science and policy of early childhood intervention programs". Pediatrics. 144 (6) e20192606. doi:10.1542/peds.2019-2606. PMID 31748252.
- Daro, D., Dodge, K.A., & Haskins, R. (Eds.) (2019). Universal approaches to promoting healthy development. [Special issue]. Future of Children, 29(1).
- Goodman, W.B.; Dodge, K.A.; Bai, Y.; O'Donnell, K.; Murphy, R.A. (2019). "Randomized controlled trial of Family Connects: Effects on child emergency medical care from birth – 24 months". Development and Psychopathology. 31 (5): 1863–72. doi:10.1017/S0954579419000889. PMC 7061922. PMID 31477190.
- Goodman, W.B.; Dodge, K.A.; Bai, Y.; O'Donnell, K.; Murphy, R.A. (2019). "Randomized controlled trial of Family Connects: Effects on child emergency medical care from birth – 24 months". Development and Psychopathology. 31 (5): 1863–72. doi:10.1017/S0954579419000889. PMC 7061922. PMID 31477190.
- Crowley, D. Max; Dodge, Kenneth A.; Barnett, W. Steven; Corso, Phaedra; Duffy, Sarah; Graham, Phillip; Greenberg, Mark; Haskins, Ron; Hill, Laura; Jones, Damon E.; Karoly, Lynn A.; Kuklinski, Margaret R.; Plotnick, Robert (2018). "Standards of Evidence for Conducting and Reporting Economic Evaluations in Prevention Science". Prevention Science. 19 (3): 366–390. doi:10.1007/s11121-017-0858-1. PMC 5869868. PMID 29435786.
- Dodge, KA (2018). "Toward population impact from early childhood psychological interventions". Am Psychol. 73 (9): 1117–1129. doi:10.1037/amp0000393. PMC 6416783. PMID 30525790.
- Schwartz, David; Lansford, Jennifer E.; Dodge, Kenneth A.; Pettit, Gregory S.; Bates, John E. (2018). "Peer Victimization during Middle Childhood as a Marker of Attenuated Risk for Adult Arrest". Journal of Abnormal Child Psychology. 46 (1): 57–65. doi:10.1007/s10802-017-0354-x. hdl:10161/15810. PMC 6381932. PMID 29143941.
- Dodge, K.A. (Editor) (2017). The current state of scientific knowledge on pre-kindergarten effects. Washington, DC: The Brookings Institution.
- Bierman, K.L., Greenberg M.T., Coie, J.D., Dodge, K.A., Lochman, J.E., & McMahon, R.J. (2017). Social and emotional skills training for children: The Fast Track friendship group manual. New York: Guilford Press.
- Dodge, Kenneth A.; Bai, Yu; Ladd, Helen F.; Muschkin, Clara G. (2017). "Impact of North Carolina's Early Childhood Programs and Policies on Educational Outcomes in Elementary School". Child Development. 88 (3): 996–1014. doi:10.1111/cdev.12645. hdl:10161/13015. PMID 27859011.
- Lansford, Jennifer E.; Dodge, Kenneth A.; Pettit, Gregory S.; Bates, John E. (2016). "A Public Health Perspective on School Dropout and Adult Outcomes: A Prospective Study of Risk and Protective Factors from Age 5 to 27 Years". Journal of Adolescent Health. 58 (6): 652–658. doi:10.1016/j.jadohealth.2016.01.014. PMC 4877222. PMID 27009741.
- Dodge, Kenneth A.; Bierman, Karen L.; Coie, John D.; Greenberg, Mark T.; Lochman, John E.; McMahon, Robert J.; Pinderhughes, Ellen E. (2015). "Impact of Early Intervention on Psychopathology, Crime, and Well-Being at Age 25". American Journal of Psychiatry. 172 (1): 59–70. doi:10.1176/appi.ajp.2014.13060786. PMC 4485380. PMID 25219348.
- Dodge, Kenneth A.; Haskins, Ron (2015). "Children and Government". Handbook of Child Psychology and Developmental Science. pp. 1–50. doi:10.1002/9781118963418.childpsy417. ISBN 9781118963418.
- Dodge, Kenneth A.; Malone, Patrick S.; Lansford, Jennifer E.; Sorbring, Emma; Skinner, Ann T.; Tapanya, Sombat; Tirado, Liliana Maria Uribe; Zelli, Arnaldo; Alampay, Liane Peña; Al-Hassan, Suha M.; Bacchini, Dario; Bombi, Anna Silvia; Bornstein, Marc H.; Chang, Lei; Deater-Deckard, Kirby; Di Giunta, Laura; Oburu, Paul; Pastorelli, Concetta (2015). "Hostile attributional bias and aggressive behavior in global context". Proceedings of the National Academy of Sciences. 112 (30): 9310–9315. Bibcode:2015PNAS..112.9310D. doi:10.1073/pnas.1418572112. PMC 4522743. PMID 26170281.
- Dodge, Kenneth A.; Goodman, W. Benjamin; Murphy, Robert A.; o'Donnell, Karen; Sato, Jeannine; Guptill, Susan (2014). "Implementation and Randomized Controlled Trial Evaluation of Universal Postnatal Nurse Home Visiting". American Journal of Public Health. 104 (Suppl 1): S136–S143. doi:10.2105/AJPH.2013.301361. PMC 4011097. PMID 24354833.
- Dodge, K. A.; Goodman, W. B.; Murphy, R. A.; O'Donnell, K.; Sato, J. (2013). "Randomized Controlled Trial of Universal Postnatal Nurse Home Visiting: Impact on Emergency Care". Pediatrics. 132 (Suppl 2): S140–S146. doi:10.1542/peds.2013-1021M. PMC 3943376. PMID 24187116.
- Dodge, K.A., Malone, P.S., Lansford, J.E., Miller, S., Pettit, G.S., & Bates, J.E. "A Dynamic Cascade Model of the Development of Substance-Use Onset". Monographs of the Society for Research in Child Development. 74, Serial No. 294, 2009.
