= Community crime prevention =

Community crime prevention relates to interventions designed to bring reform to the social conditions that influence, and encourage, offending in residential communities. Community crime prevention has a focus on both the social and local institutions found within communities which can influence crime rates, specifically juvenile delinquency.

Community-based crime prevention places a strong emphasis on the importance of peer influence and mentoring in preventing delinquency. The establishment of the Federal Crime Bill in 1994 gave rise to the use of community crime prevention. Community initiatives such as Communities That Care (CTC), Pulling America's Communities Together (PACT), and Operation Weed and Seed are all examples of effective community initiatives which deemed to be significantly influential in reducing delinquency within residential communities.

After-school programs (ASPs) have also been connected with effectively reducing delinquency. Interest in utilizing ASPs for delinquency prevention increased dramatically after research reports found that juvenile arrest rates peak between 3:00 and 6:00 pm, when youth are most likely to be unsupervised. There are two reasons why after-school programs are critical settings through which to support children’s development. First, health promotion is already a major goal of after-school programs, whose activities promote building social skills. Secondly, after-school programs have been statistically proven to improve children’s psychosocial and academic outcomes, especially low-income children.

== Federal Crime Bill of 1994 ==
The Federal Crime Bill of 1994, often times referred to as the Violent Crime Control and Law Enforcement Act of 1994, was signed by President Clinton on September 13, 1994, as a way of shifting towards adapting more "tough on crime" policies while expanding police presences within residential communities through a variety of community policing interventions.

The bill resulted in the following reforms:

- Increased the use of federal penalties for certain crimes, while also revealing new offenses punishable by death.
- Reclassified many offenses as federal crimes, including but not limited to "drive-by" shootings and carjacking.
- Provided federal funding for law enforcement (state and federal), crime prevention interventions, and the establishment of new state prisons.
- Increased the overall funding for federal law enforcement, with an enhanced focus towards border patrol security and Immigration and Naturalization Service (INS).

== Comprehensive community initiatives ==
=== Communities That Care ===
Communities That Care (CTC) is a crime prevention system aimed at diverting youth from delinquent behavior through an enhanced focus and assessment of risk and protective factors. The system was developed by Dr. J. David Hawkins and Dr. Richard F. Catalano. The mission is to underpin strong social bonds with family, school and the community by providing youth with opportunities, valuable skill sets and meaningful recognition. Strong social bonds motivate youth to adopt the healthy standards for behavior. The core of CTC is the social development strategy that identifies and reinforces vital protective factors which steer youth away from delinquency and ultimately promote positive youth development. Through a public health approach, CTC helps communities identify risk factors and the necessary resources to successfully address the underlying issues facing youth throughout the community. CTC has been effective in producing favorable reductions in youth delinquency- specifically alcohol and tobacco use and overall crime and violence.

The five-phase CTC process uses an early intervention and prevention framework to guide communities towards identifying and understanding their local needs, setting priorities, and implementing tested effective strategies to address those needs.

1. Get started - Identify and recruit community stakeholders and vital decision-makers to adhere to the CTC process.
2. Get organized - Planning and decision making for CTC effort within communities are constructed by the community board and other essential governance structures
3. Develop a profile - A community profile is developed. By compiling data from the CTC Youth Survey, public data, and assessments of existing community resources and strengths, the focus for community intervention is identified.
4. Create a plan - The community board constructs a community action plan used to outline and implement prevention work in the community.
5. Implement and evaluate - Precise implementation of the community action plan begins

Strategy for interaction

- Opportunities: Provide youth with various developmental opportunities, which encourage participation and drives positive interaction with those reinforcing conventional behavior
- Skills: Help youth acquire the vital skills needed to be successful
- Recognition: Provide youth with constant recognition and acknowledgment for their effort, achievements, and overall improvement
- Bonding: Acknowledge a young person’s effort and promote positive bonding — a feeling of attachment and commitment to those who provide meaningful recognition. Bonding can occur with staff, teachers, coaches, relatives, etc.
- Clear standards for behavior: Through bonding with prosocial others, youth become motivated to adopt the healthy behaviors of those they have established positive relationships with

=== Pulling America's Communities Together ===
Pulling America's Communities Together (PACT) is a systematic federal effort established in 1993 to extend the influence of broad-based and coordinated, locally-designed and implemented anti-violence strategies. The objective of PACT is to ensure federal agency involvement and influence in producing crime reduction strategies by removing government barriers and motivating the collective formation of partnerships with cities, counties and states. Federal agencies representative of PACT include: the departments of Education, Health and Human Services, Housing and Urban Development, Justice, Labor, and the Office of National Drug Control Policy.

Through PACT, the federal government strenuously promotes the growth of broad-based, fully coordinated local- and state-wide initiatives to ensure community safety and effectively reduce crime. Communities take on the responsibility of crafting appropriate and efficient solutions to address crime and other local issues. The federal government assists communities in building partnerships and provides resources and knowledge about anti-violence strategies. This project drove the development of the Partnerships Against Violence Network (PAVNET). The PAVNET is a computerized system providing essential information on both technical assistance, as well as model programs relating to crime and violence reduction. The PAVNET compiles information from more than 30 federal resource centers including information on funding, technical assistance, and additional information. The PAVNET consists of information regarding community violence, youth violence, family violence, substance abuse, and victims.

PACT sites can be found in Atlanta, Denver, Nebraska and Washington D.C. A substantial amount of the work involved at the PACT sites included: juvenile risk assessment, data integration, compilation and analysis, identifying high-risk communities, violent offender tracking, information sharing, and risk and needs assessment.

PACT has been recognized for multiple credible achievements, including:

- Motivating effective cooperation between multiple agencies worldwide
- Providing a blueprint in order to collectively draft efficient solutions to crime and violence issues
- Bringing together diverse jurisdictions and community groups for collaboration towards reform
- Producing worldwide collective efforts in reducing and preventing crime within local agencies

=== Operation Weed and Seed ===
Operation Weed and Seed was developed in 1991 by the U.S. Department of Justice. Operation Weed and Seed is a multiagency community-minded approach to law enforcement, crime prevention, and neighborhood restoration. The strategy was constructed as a way to both reduce crime and other drug-related crimes in selected high-crime neighborhoods as well as provide an overall safe environment for community members. The Weed and Seed strategy brings together federal, state, local crime-fighting agencies, and other essential organizations with the collective goal of "weeding out" violent crime and gang activity while simultaneously seeding in vital social services and economic revitalization.

The Weed and Seed strategy is a two-pronged approach to crime control and prevention: first, law enforcement agencies and prosecutors cooperate in "weeding out" criminals from the target area, and, second, "seeding" brings prevention, intervention, treatment, and neighborhood revitalization services to the area. The Weed and Seed strategy is a comprehensive response to crime and neighborhood decay, composed of four fundamental principles: collaboration, coordination, community participation, and leveraging resources. The strategy is a multilevel strategic plan centered around four basic components: law enforcement, community policing prevention, intervention and treatment, and neighborhood restoration.

The four elements of Weed and Seed:

- Suppression
- Community-oriented policing
- Prevention, intervention and treatment
- Neighborhood restoration

Suppression

- Brings prevention, intervention, treatment, and neighborhood revitalization services to the area

Community-oriented policing

- Community policing embraces two key concepts: community engagement and problem solving. Through this model officers establish a cooperative relationship with community residents giving the community a sense of responsibility in solving crime problems

Prevention, intervention and treatment

- Focuses on collective neighborhood efforts to enforce protective factors while also reducing any possible risks therefore promoting conventional behavior that can lead to positive development

Risk factors: economic deprivation, family management problems, early academic failure

Neighborhood restoration

- Focuses on improving the surrounding economic and social conditions of communities with assistance from federal, state, local, tribal, and other private sector resources

== Influence of ASPs on delinquency ==
=== LA's Best ===
LA's Best has had a positive impact on the reduction of juvenile delinquency. A study conducted on LA's Best in 2008 showed that students who took part in LA's Best longer than other students committed fewer crimes. A crucial determinant to the effect of LA's BEST on juvenile crime was youth engagement: the number of years a student attended and how intensely the student was engaged in the program on an ongoing basis. Results indicated that students who participated more intensively in LA's Best benefited more and were more likely to refrain from committing crime. By 2005, approximately 87.5% of the control group members and low-engagement LA's Best participants had avoided juvenile crime records. In contrast, about 91.4% of medium-engagement and 93.1% of high-engagement LA's Best students avoided juvenile crime records.

=== Big Brothers Big Sisters of America ===
A study conducted in 1998 showed that approximately 45% of the youth were shown to be less likely to have started using illegal drugs or alcohol, compared to their counterparts. In addition, they were seen as less likely to get into fights or altercations (32% less than that of the control youths), or skip school (52% fewer days then counterparts, 30% less likely to skip a day of school at all). They were also seen as being more confident about their school performance (increased GPA) as well as interacting better and improving relationships with their family and within the household (lying to their parents 37% less than did control group youths). Additionally, there were some remarkable impacts by race and gender.
