= Mark T. Greenberg =

American academic (born 1951)

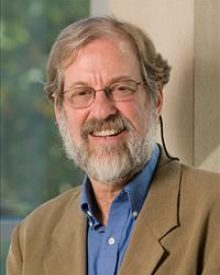
- Born: December 31, 1951 (age 74); Harrisburg, Pennsylvania, U.S.

Academic background
- Education: University of Virginia

Academic work
- Institutions: University of Washington; Pennsylvania State University; University of Manchester; University of Stavanger

Mark T. Greenberg (born December 31, 1951) is an American child psychologist and professor. He is the emeritus holder of The Bennett Endowed Chair in Prevention Research in the Penn State College of Health and Human Development, and founding director of the Edna Bennett Pierce Prevention Research Center at the Pennsylvania State University. He is the chair of CREATE for Education, a non-profit organization that promotes caring and compassion in education.

== Early life and education ==
Born and raised in Harrisburg, Pennsylvania, Greenberg received his B.A. at Johns Hopkins University and his M.S. and Ph.D. in Developmental Psychology at the University of Virginia under the mentoring of Mary D. S. Ainsworth and Robert S. Marvin.

== Career ==
After serving on the faculty of the University of Washington from 1977 to 1997, he joined the department of Human Development and Family Studies at the Pennsylvania State University as the first Bennett Chair of Prevention Research and held that position from 1997 until 2019. He founded the Edna Bennett Pierce Prevention Research Center in the Penn State College of Health and Human Development in 1998 and was the director until 2015. He also held faculty positions at the University of Manchester and the University of Stavanger. He conducted research in four areas: school-based prevention research, social and emotional learning, family- and community-level interventions, and mindfulness interventions with children and educators. He provided mentoring for many early career scientists, including those who have gone on to become directors of university prevention research centers, including Nathaniel Riggs, director of the Colorado State University Prevention Research Center.

== Research ==
Greenberg was involved in the development of numerous evidence-based interventions focused on children’s well-being. In 1980, with Carol A. Kusché he co-authored the PATHS program, an evidence-based social and emotional learning curriculum now used in thousands of schools around the world. In 1990, he joined the Conduct Problems Prevention Research Group to develop and test the Fast Track Intervention – an integrated multiple-tier model for supporting all children to succeed in school and life. He has been a collaborator in the development and/or evaluation of numerous interventions including PROSPER for youth development, Communities That Care, and the Cultivating Awareness and Resilience in Education (CARE) and Community Approach to Learning Mindfully (CALM) mindfulness programs for educators. He was the co-director of the Family Life Project, an ongoing, long-term study of the biological, individual, family and community influences that affect the development of rural children.

== Selected works ==
Greenberg has published more than 350 peer-reviewed scientific papers, chapters, and books, including:

- Greenberg, M. T., Cicchetti, D., & Cummings, E. M. (Eds.) (1990). Attachment in the preschool years: Theory, research and intervention. Chicago: University of Chicago Press.
- Greenberg, M. T., Kusche, C. A., Cook, E. T., & Quamma, J. P. (1995). Promoting emotional competence in school-aged children: The effects of the PATHS curriculum. Development and psychopathology, 7(1), 117-136.
- Kusche, C. A. & Greenberg, M. T. (1994). The PATHS (Promoting Alternative Thinking Strategies) Curriculum. South Deerfield, MA: Channing-Bete Co.
- Greenberg, M. T., Weissberg, R. P., Utne O’Brien, M., Zins, J. E., Fredericks, L., Resnik, H., & Elias, M. J. (2003). Enhancing school-based prevention and youth development through coordinated social, emotional, and academic learning, American Psychologist, 58, 466-474.
- Domitrovich, C. E., Greenberg, M. T., Cortes, R., & Kusche, C. A. (2005). The Preschool PATHS Curriculum. Deerfield, MA: Channing-Bete Publishers.
- Jennings, P. A. & Greenberg, M. (2009). The Prosocial Classroom: Teacher social and emotional competence in relation to child and classroom outcomes. Review of Educational Research, 79, 491-525.
- Greenberg, M. T. & Abenavoli, R. (2017). Universal Interventions: Fully Exploring Their Impacts and Potential to Produce Population-Level Impacts. Journal of Research on Educational Effectiveness, 1, 40-67.
- Greenberg, M. T., Domitrovich, C. E., Weissberg, R. P., & Durlak, J. A. (2017). Social and emotional learning as a public health approach to education. Future of Children, 27 (1), 13-32.
- Conduct Problems Prevention Research Group. (2019). The Fast Track Program for Children at Risk. The Guilford Press.

== Honors and awards ==
In 2003, Greenberg was appointed as a member of the National Advisory Council on Drug Abuse of the National Institute on Drug Abuse. He received the Research Scientist Award from the Society for Prevention Research (2002), the Society for Research in Child Development Distinguished Contributions to Public Policy for Children Award (2009), the Society for Prevention Research Presidential Award (2013), and the Urie Bronfenbrenner Award for Lifetime Contribution to Developmental Psychology in the Service of Science and Society from the American Psychological Association (2016). He is one of the founders of the Collaborative for Academic Social and Emotional Learning and a Fellow of the American Educational Research Association.

== Philanthropy ==
He and his wife, Christa Turksma, endowed the annual Compassion Lecture at the Pennsylvania State University.
