= Kenneth Land =

American sociologist

- Born: Kenneth Carl Land; August 19, 1942 (age 84); Llano, Texas
- Education: Texas Lutheran College, University of Texas at Austin
- Known for: Capital punishment Child well-being
- Awards: 1997 Paul F. Lazarsfeld Award from the Methodology Section of the American Sociological Association
- Scientific career
- Fields: Mathematical sociology Mathematical Demography Statistics
- Workplaces: University of Illinois at Urbana Champaign, University of Texas at Austin, Duke University
- Thesis: Explorations in mathematical sociology (1969)
- Doctoral advisor: Daniel O. Price

Kenneth Carl Land (born August 19, 1942) is the John Franklin Crowell Professor Emeritus of Sociology at Duke University, where he is also a research professor at the Social Science Research Institute. He is also a fellow at the Center for the Study of Aging at Duke University Medical Center and a faculty fellow at the Duke University Center for Child and Family Policy.

== Early life and education ==
Land was born in Llano, Texas, on August 19, 1942. He received his Bachelor of Arts degrees in sociology and history from Texas Lutheran College in 1964, his Master of Arts degree in sociology from the University of Texas-Austin in 1966, and his Ph.D. in sociology and mathematics from the University of Texas-Austin in 1969. He then completed a one-year Social Science Research Council postdoc in mathematical statistics at Columbia University.

== Career ==
Land was a staff member of the Russell Sage Foundation for three years soon after completing his postdoc. At Russell Sage, he worked on the Indicators of Social Change project. From 1976 to 1982, he was a member of the Social Science Research Council's Advisory and Planning Committee on Social Indicators, where he worked with F. Thomas Juster to coordinate a Workshop on Social Accounting Systems. He taught at the University of Illinois at Urbana–Champaign, and then the University of Texas-Austin, before joining the faculty of Duke in 1986. He served as chairman of Duke's sociology department from January 1986 to August 1997. He was named the John Franklin Crowell Professor of Sociology at Duke in 1990. He was president of the Southern Sociological Society from 2000 to 2001, of the International Society for Quality-of-Life Studies (ISQOLS) from 2001 to 2002, and of the International Sociological Association's Working Group on Social Indicators and Social Reporting from 2002 to 2006.

== Research ==
Land has done extensive research on contemporary social trends and quality-of-life measurement, demography, criminology, formal organizations, and mathematical and statistical models and methods for the study of social and demographic processes. Land worked on the Foundation for Child Development's Child and Youth Well-Being Index Project 1998 to 2017. As part of this work, he developed the Child Well-Being Index, based on 28 indicators, to track American children's well-being since 1975. In 2017, the YMCA OF THE USA began a joint sponsorship of the Annual Child and Youth Well-Being Index (CWI) Reports from this project. Along with Raymond Teske and Hui Zheng, he has also researched capital punishment in Texas using monthly data on numbers of executions and homicides. This research found evidence of a short-term (within the month of an execution) deterrent effect on homicides that is concentrated among non-felony homicides and part of which is displaced to subsequent months.

== Honors and awards ==
Land was elected a Fellow of the American Statistical Association 1978, the Sociological Research Association 1981, the American Association for the Advancement of Science 1992, ISQOLS 1997, and the American Society of Criminology 2004. His awards include the 1997 Paul F. Lazarsfeld Award from the Methodology Section of the American Sociological Association and ISQOLS' 2003 Distinguished Service Award. In 2023, he was invited by the American Sociological Association Retirement Network (ASARN) to deliver the ASARN Life in Sociology Lecture at the American Sociological Association Annual Meeting in Philadelphia, Pennsylvania on August 20, 2023; the title of his Lecture was Once a Sociologist, Always a Sociologist.
