= William Hansen =

William Hansen may refer to:

== Politics ==
- William C. Hansen (1891–1983), American educator and politician
- William D. Hansen, American businessman and politician
- William O. Hansen (1860–1930), American politician
- Bill Hansen (politician) (born 1931), American politician in Iowa

== Others ==
- William Hansen (actor) (1911–1975), American actor
- William Hansen (classicist) (born 1941), American scholar and author
- William Hansen (field hockey) (born 1939), Belgian Olympic hockey player
- Bill Hansen (scientist) (born 1949), American scientist
- W. W. Hansen (William Webster Hansen, 1909–1949), American physicist
- Willy Hansen (Willy Falck Hansen, 1906–1978), Danish cyclist
- Bill Hansen (high jumper) (born 1956), American high jumper, 1978 All-American for the Iowa Hawkeyes track and field team

== See also ==
- William Hanson (disambiguation)
