= Marc H. Bornstein =

American researcher (born 1947)

Marc H. Bornstein is Director of the Center for the Study of Children, Parents, and Society in Bethesda, Maryland, an International Research Associate at the Institute for Fiscal Studies in London, and Senior Advisor for Research for Early Childhood Development (ECD) Parenting Programmes at UNICEF.

== Education ==
Marc H. Bornstein is a graduate of the Boston Latin School. He earned his Bachelor of Arts (B.A.) from Columbia College, Columbia University, and later earned Master of Science (M.S.) and Doctor of Philosophy (Ph.D.) degrees from Yale University. In addition, he has received several international academic honors and appointments. On December 12, 2006, he was awarded an honorary doctorate (Laurea Honoris Causa) by the University of Padua, Italy. On July 12, 2017, he was appointed Kessler Honorary Professor at the University of Trento, Italy. On May 19, 2020, he was Honorarprofessor of Psychology at Heidelberg University, Germany.

== Recognition ==
Bornstein was a J. S. Guggenheim Foundation Fellow (1983–1984) and received a Research Career Development Award from the National Institute of Child Health and Human Development (1983–1988). He also received the C. S. Ford Cross-Cultural Research Award from the Human Relations Area Files, the B. R. McCandless Young Scientist Award and the Division 7 Award for Distinguished Contributions to Developmental Psychology from the American Psychological Association, a United States PHS Superior Service Award and an Award of Merit from the National Institutes of Health, two Japan Society for the Promotion of Science Fellowships, four Awards for Excellence from the American Mensa Education & Research Foundation, the Arnold Gesell Prize from the Theodor Hellbrügge Foundation, the Distinguished Scientific Contribution Award from the International Society for the Study of Behavioral Development, and both the Distinguished International Contributions to Child Development Award and the Distinguished Scientific Contributions to Child Development Award from the Society for Research in Child Development.

Bornstein is founder and director of the International Network of Parenting and Child Development (participating countries: Argentina, Belgium, Brazil, Cameroon, Canada, Chile, England, France, India, Israel, Italy, Japan, Kenya, Peru, Republic of Korea, the United States), and he has multiple associated research sites (China, Colombia, Jordan, the Philippines, Sweden, Thailand, and 93 UNICEF Multiple Indicator Cluster Survey LMICs). He is published in Chinese, Czech, English, French, German, Hebrew, Italian, Japanese, Korean, Polish, Portuguese, Spanish, and Turkish, and he has given invited presentations and named lectureships in Argentina, Belgium, Brazil, Canada, Chile, China, Colombia, Czechoslovakia, Denmark, England, Finland, France, Germany, India, Israel, Italy, Japan, Jordan, Luxembourg, the Philippines, Poland, Portugal, Republic of Korea, Scotland, Singapore, Sweden, Thailand, and the United States.

== Positions ==
Bornstein served as president of the Society for Research in Child Development from 2017 to 2019 and as a member of its Governing Council from 2005 to 2011. He also served on the Executive Committee of the International Congress of Infant Studies from 2010 to 2016 and on the Executive Committee of the International Society for the Study of Behavioral Development from 2020 to 2026.

Bornstein began his advanced academic career at Yale University, where he was a university fellow (1969–1971), a United States Public Health Service trainee (1971–1972), a Prize Teaching Fellow (1972–1973), and a United States Public Health Service postdoctoral research fellow (1974–1975). He subsequently held faculty appointments at Princeton University as Assistant Professor of psychology (1975–1981) and New York University as professor of psychology and Human Development (1981–1988).

Additionally, Bornstein served as senior investigator and head of Child and Family Research at the Eunice Kennedy Shriver National Institute of Child Health and Human Development (NICHD) from 1987 to 2018, and as an Institution affiliate from 2019 to 2026. His responsibilities at NICHD also included heading the Fetal-Maternal Medicine, Imaging, and Behavioral Determinants of Development Affinity Group. A 2025 bibliometric analysis of scientists in the NICHD Division of Intramural Research ranked Bornstein 2nd Lifetime Globally in All Fields, 2nd Lifetime Globally in Medicine, and 3rd Lifetime Globally in Pediatrics. His other academic positions include Research Professor of Psychology at the University of Virginia (from 1987) and New York University (from 1989), and special member of the graduate faculty at the University of Maryland (from 1991).

In 2019, Bornstein became senior advisor for research for Early Childhood Development (ECD) Parenting Programmes at UNICEF. In 2026, he became director of the Center for the Study of Children, Parents, and Society.

=== International Academic Appointments ===
Bornstein's academic and professional appointments have included the Population Council in New York (1970); visiting scientist at the Max Planck Institute of Psychiatry in Munich, Germany (1974); Visiting Professor at University College London (1978–1979); child clinical fellow at the Institute for Behavior Therapy in New York (1981–1982); professeur invité at the Laboratoire de Psychologie Expérimentale of the French National Centre for Scientific Research (CNRS) in Paris (1984); visiting professor at the University of Tokyo (1986); and professeur invité at the Laboratoire de Psychologie du Développement et de l'Éducation de l'Enfant at the Sorbonne in Paris (1987).

His subsequent appointments have included asesor científico honorario adjunto at the University of Palermo in Buenos Aires, Argentina (1990); visiting fellow of the British Psychological Society at the University of Exeter (1992); principal scientist for Parenting and Child Well-being at the Center for Child Well-being in Atlanta (1999); visiting scientist at the Human Development Resource Centre in Bamenda, Cameroon (2005); visiting scholar at the Institute of Psychology at Seoul National University in South Korea (2005); visiting professor at the University of Trento, Italy (2007 and 2009); and profesor visitante at the Pontifical Catholic University of Chile in Santiago (2009).

In 2015, Bornstein held appointments as Institute for Advanced Studies Benjamin Meaker Visiting Professor at the University of Bristol, Jacobs Foundation Scholar-in-Residence in Marbach, Germany, and honorary fellow in the Department of Psychiatry at the University of Oxford.

His academic appointments since 2017 have included International Research Associate at the Institute for Fiscal Studies in London (from 2017); adjunct academic member of the Council of the Department of Cognitive Sciences at the University of Trento (from 2017); Adjunct Professor of Psychology at the University of Maryland, Baltimore County (from 2018); Adjunct Professor in the Faculty of Graduate Studies and external member of the LaMarsh Centre for Child & Youth Research at York University in Toronto (from 2019); honorary Professor of Psychology (Honorarprofessor) at Heidelberg University in Germany (from 2020); visiting scholar in the Eliot-Pearson Department of Child Study and Human Development at Tufts University (from 2021); and visiting professor at Gabriele d'Annunzio University of Chieti-Pescara, Italy (2025).

== Editorial and Professional Activities ==
Bornstein served as Editor-in-Chief of Child Development from 1995 to 2001 and was the founding editor of Parenting: Science and Practice in 2000. He has also served as series editor of Monographs in Parenting and Studies in Parenting and Cambridge University Press's Elements in Child Development since 2019. His editorial activities have included special issues on fathering and father–child relationships (2025) and parenting and culture (2026). He has served on the editorial boards of numerous professional journals and participated in scientific advisory panels, research committees, and international scholarly societies.

His professional activities have also included administering federal and foundation research grants; consulting for governments, foundations, universities, publishers, scientific journals, media organizations, and international organizations, including UNICEF; and organizing scientific workshops and conferences. From 2014 to 2017, Bornstein indirected revisions of children's toy age-determination and safety guidelines for the U.S. Consumer Product Safety Commission.

== Publications ==
Bornstein is coauthor of Perceiving Similarity and Comprehending Metaphor (1987); Development: Infancy through Adolescence (2011); Lifespan Development: Infancy through Adulthood (2011); Genitorialità: Fattori Biologici e Culturali dell'Essere Genitori (2013); Gender in Low- and Middle-Income Countries (2016); The Architecture of the Child Mind: g, Fs, and Their Hierarchy (2019); Infancy: The Basics (2022); Parenting and Child Development in Low- and Middle-Income Countries (2023); Development in Infancy (6 editions, most recently in 2024); and Newborn to Infant to Child: A Chronological Approach to Early Childhood Development (2025). His sole-authored works include Parenting, Infancy, Culture: Specificity and Commonality in Argentina, Belgium, Israel, Italy, and the United States (2022) and Parenting: Selected Works of Marc H. Bornstein (2022).

Bornstein has served as general editor of The Crosscurrents in Contemporary Psychology Series (10 volumes), Monographs in Parenting, Studies in Parenting, and the Cambridge University Press Elements in Child Development series. He edited Maternal Responsiveness: Characteristics and Consequences (1989); The Handbook of Cultural Developmental Science (2010); the Handbook of Parenting (5 volumes, 3 editions, most recently in 2019); and Psychological Insights for Understanding COVID-19 and Families, Parents, and Children (2021). He was also Editor-in-Chief of the SAGE Encyclopedia of Lifespan Human Development (2018).

Bornstein coedited Stability and Continuity in Mental Development (1989); Contemporary Constructions of the Child (1991); The Role of Play in the Development of Thought (1993); Early Child Development in the French Tradition (1994); Acculturation and Parent-Child Relationships (2006); Immigrant Families in Contemporary Society (2007); The Infant Mind: Origins of the Social Brain (2013); Ecological Settings and Processes in Developmental Systems (2015), Volume 4 of the Handbook of Child Psychology and Developmental Science; Parenting Across Cultures from Childhood to Adolescence: Development in Nine Countries (2021); Developmental Science: An Advanced Textbook (8 editions, most recently in 2025); and the two-volume APA Handbook of Pediatric Psychology, Developmental–Behavioral Pediatrics, and Developmental Science (2025).

Bornstein's other editorial contributions include special issues of scientific journals: The Development of Attachment: Integrating Genes, Brain, Behavior, and Environment (2017); Parenting and Infant Cry (2019); Brain Imaging to Study Infant Behavior and Development (2020); Enriching the Study of Human Development Through the Use of the Specificity Principle: Theory, Research, and Application (2021); The Future of Parenting Programs (2022); and special issues of Parenting: Science and Practice addressing contemporary perspectives on fathering and father–child relationships (2025) and parenting and culture (2026).

Bornstein has published widely in experimental, methodological, comparative, developmental, and cultural science, as well as neuroscience, pediatrics, and aesthetics. His scholarly work includes hundreds of scientific papers, chapters in academic collections, textbooks, and edited volumes. His recent research has addressed parenting and child development across cultures, developmental research methods, father–child relationships, and early childhood development in low- and middle-income countries. In 2006, Bornstein was named among the Top 20 Authors for Productivity in Developmental Science by the American Educational Research Association.

Bornstein has also contributed as an author or consultant to children's books, videos, and puzzles, including materials in The Child's World and Baby Explorer series.

== Biographical entries ==
- "Bornstein, Marc H." In N. Sheehy, A. J. Chapman, and W. A. Conroy (eds.). Biographical Dictionary of Psychology (pp. 76–78). New York: Routledge, 1997; paperback edition, 2002. ISBN 9780415099974 (1997); ISBN 9780415285612 (2002).
- Cote, L. R. (2005). "Marc H. Bornstein." In C. B. Fisher and R. M. Lerner (eds.), Encyclopedia of Applied Developmental Science (Vol. 1, pp. 170–172). Thousand Oaks, CA: SAGE Publications. ISBN 9780761928201.
- Bornstein, M. H. (2025). "A Developmental Science Investigation into a Developmental Science Life, or Why I Paint." In F. Kessel (ed.), Pillars of Developmental Psychology: Recollections and Reflections (pp. 148–160). Cambridge University Press. doi:10.1017/9781009425766.015.

== Personal life ==
Bornstein is married with two children, the physicians Lea and Jonathan Bornstein. Bornstein is a woodworker and painter.
