= William Hanson =

William or Bill Hanson may refer to:

== Arts and entertainment ==
- William Hanson (author) (born 1989), British author and etiquette coach
- William F. Hanson (1887–1969), American music composer
- William Lawrence Hanson (born 1903), composer
- Billy Hanson, the name given to Danny Hansford in the movie Midnight in the Garden of Good and Evil

== Sports ==
- William Hanson (cricketer) (born 1982), English cricketer
- Bill Hanson (basketball) (1940–2018), American basketball player
- Bill Hanson (footballer) (1893–1946), Australian rules footballer

== Others ==
- William Hanson (engineer) (1810–1875), railway and water engineer in South Australia, brother of Richard Davies Hanson
- William Cook Hanson (1909–1995), United States federal judge
- C. William Hanson, American internist, anesthesiologist and intensivist

== See also ==
- William Hansen (disambiguation)
- William Hanson Dodge (1866–1932), American photographer
