= Duke University Center for Child and Family Policy =

Universit unit in Durham, North Carolina, US

Duke Center for Child and Family Policy
- Founded: 1999
- Type: Nonprofit Organization
- Purpose: Child and Family Policy
- Location: Duke University, Durham, North Carolina
- Services: Research, Teaching, Policy Engagement
- Key people: Kenneth A. Dodge (director)
- Website: Duke Center for Child and Family Policy

The Duke University Center for Child and Family Policy was established on July 1, 1999, with Kenneth A. Dodge, William McDougall Professor of Public Policy and Professor of Psychology and Neuroscience, as its director. The center brings scientific research on children and families into the policymaking arena.

== History ==
The Center for Child and Family Policy grew out of discussions among a group of Duke faculty members from different disciplines who were interested in child development and child policy. The group, which included John Coie (psychology), Phil Costanzo (psychology), Philip J. Cook (public policy and economics), Jane Costello (psychiatry), and Alan Kerckhoff (sociology), among others, approached William Chafe, then dean of the faculty of Trinity College of Arts and Sciences, who agreed to support the launching of a new center dedicated to child and family policy. In 1998, Kenneth Dodge, a clinical and developmental psychologist from Vanderbilt University who had earned his Ph.D. at Duke in 1978, was recruited to lead the venture.

The Center for Child and Family Policy opened on July 1, 1999. It now includes about 70 employees and more than 40 affiliated faculty fellows. It is affiliated with Duke University's Sanford School of Public Policy and Social Science Research Institute.

== Programs ==
=== Research ===
Center research focuses on issues relevant to child and family policy, including early childhood education, early adversity and early interventions, ADHD, education reform, parenting across cultures, changing family structure, effects of job loss on student performance and prevention of adolescent problem behaviors such as violence, mental illness and substance abuse. The Center houses a large research effort focused on the biology and behavior underlying teen substance abuse, the Center for the Study of Adolescent Risk and Resilience (C-StARR).

NC Education Research Data Center The Center is also home to the NC Education Research Data Center, established in 2000 as a partnership with the North Carolina Department of Public Instruction. It houses data on N.C.'s public schools, which is available to researchers and nonprofit institutions for use in research.

=== Teaching ===
The Center offers fellowships to undergraduate and graduate students interested in child and family policy. It also offers a Child Policy Research Certificate program for Duke undergraduates.

=== Public engagement ===
Center faculty and staff consult with policymakers and practitioners, responding to requests for research, information, and program evaluation. Center staff members have presented educational seminars for North Carolina lawmakers on issues such as childhood obesity and juvenile justice. The Center's School Research Partnership facilitates research in local schools, linking school district and other organizations with Duke students and researchers.
