= Society for Prevention Research =

American learned society

- Abbreviation: SPR
- Formation: 1991; 35 years ago
- Founders: Zili Sloboda; Bill Bukoski
- Founded at: Pittsburgh, Pennsylvania
- Headquarters: Fairfax, Virginia
- Members: 826 (2015)
- President: Guillermo "Willy" Prado
- Secretary: Margaret Kuklinski
- Treasurer: Douglas Coatsworth
- Publication: Prevention Science
- Website: www.preventionresearch.org

The Society for Prevention Research (SPR) is an American non-profit learned society dedicated to prevention science.

== History ==
The Society for Prevention Research was established in 1991 at a meeting of National Institute on Drug Abuse staff and prevention research center directors held in Pittsburgh, Pennsylvania. By the following spring, it was incorporated as a non-profit organization in New York. Steven P. Schinke served as the Society's first president from 1993 to 1995. In 2000, its official journal, Prevention Science, was established.

== Presidents ==
The president of the Society for Prevention Research is Guillermo "Willy" Prado. The following is a partial list of the Society's past presidents:

- 1993–1995: Steven P. Schinke
- 1995–1997: Richard Clayton
- 1997–1998: Karol Kumpfer
- 1998 (interim): Richard Clayton
- 1998–2001: Sheppard Kellam
- 2001–2003: Gilbert Botvin
- 2003–2005: J. David Hawkins
- 2005–2007: Anthony Biglan
- 2007–2009: Zili Sloboda
- 2009–2011: Linda Collins
- 2011–2013: Deborah Gorman-Smith
- 2013–2015: Felipe Gonzalez Castro
