= Midwestern Prevention Project =

The Midwestern Prevention Project was a research project funded in part by the National Institute on Drug Abuse, the Ewing Marion Kauffman Foundation, and the Lilly Endowment. It evaluated a community-wide effort at preventing alcohol, tobacco, and marijuana use among adolescents. The program included school, community/policy, parent, and mass media components.
