= Parenting: Science and Practice =

- Discipline: Parenting, caregiving, childbearing
- Language: English
- Edited by: Marc H. Bornstein

Publication details
- History: 2001-present
- Publisher: Routledge
- Frequency: Quarterly
- License: .065.686
- Impact factor: (2013)

Standard abbreviations
- ISO 4: Parent.: Sci. Pract.
- NLM: Parent Sci Pract

Indexing
- ISSN: 1529-5192 (print); 1532-7922 (web)
- LCCN: 00211799
- OCLC no.: 611814723

Links
- Journal homepage; Online access; Online archive

Parenting: Science and Practice is a quarterly peer-reviewed academic journal that covers research on parenting, caregiving, and childbearing and is published by Routledge. The editor-in-chief is Marc H. Bornstein.

== Abstracting and indexing ==
This journal is abstracted and indexed in:

- Current Contents/Social & Behavioral Sciences
- Social Sciences Citation Index
- Scopus
- Academic Search
- CINAHL
- TOC Premier
- CINAHL
- PsycINFO

According to the Journal Citation Reports, the journal has a 2013 impact factor of 1.065.
