= Steven P. Schinke =

American academic (1945–2019)

Steven Paul Schinke (9 May 1945 – 1 January 2019) was an American academic.

Steven Schinke was born in Elkhorn, Wisconsin, to parents Edward and Vera Schinke on 9 May 1945. He graduated from Elkhorn Area High School and joined the United States Air Force. Upon his discharge from military service in 1967, Schinke enrolled at the University of Wisconsin–Madison, where he earned a bachelor's and master's degree in social work, and a doctorate in social welfare. Schinke began teaching at the University of Washington in 1975, and left for Columbia University in 1986, for an appointment as D'Elbert and Selma Keenan Professor of Social Work. While teaching at Columbia in the 1980s, Schinke also attended the Columbia Business School for a master's in business administration. He established a startup company and a non-profit organization. In 2011, Schinke was elected a fellow of the American Academy of Social Work and Social Welfare. He died of pulmonary fibrosis on 1 January 2019, in Roxbury, Connecticut.
