= Prevention Science =

Quarterly public health journal

- Subject: Prevention science
- Language: English
- Edited by: Catherine Bradshaw

Publication details
- History: 2000–present
- Publisher: Springer Science+Business Media
- Frequency: 8/year
- Impact factor: 2.594 (2017)

Standard abbreviations
- ISO 4: Prev. Sci.

Indexing
- ISSN: 1389-4986 (print); 1573-6695 (web)
- LCCN: 2001200281
- OCLC no.: 46479930

Links
- Journal homepage; Online archive

Prevention Science is a peer-reviewed public health journal covering prevention science.

== Background ==
It was established in 2000 and is published eight times per year by Springer Science+Business Media on behalf of the Society for Prevention Research, of which it is the official journal. The editor-in-chief is Catherine Bradshaw (University of Virginia). According to the Journal Citation Reports, the journal has a 2017 impact factor of 2.594, ranking it 25th out of 156 journals in the category "Public, Environmental & Occupational Health".
