= Communities That Care =

Program of the US Center for Substance Abuse Prevention

Communities That Care (CTC) is a program of the Center for Substance Abuse Prevention (CSAP) in the office of the United States Government's Substance Abuse and Mental Health Services Administration (SAMHSA). CTC is a coalition-based prevention operating system that uses a public health approach to prevent youth problem behaviors such as violence, delinquency, school drop out and substance abuse. Using strategic consultation, training, and research-based tools, CTC is designed to help community stakeholders and decision makers understand and apply information about risk and protective factors, and programs that are proven to make a difference in promoting healthy youth development, in order to most effectively address the specific issues facing their community's youth.

Developed by Drs. J. David Hawkins and Richard Catalano at the University of Washington's Social Development Research Group (SDRG), CTC's principal strategy, the Social Development Strategy (right), focuses on strengthening protective factors that can buffer young people from problem behaviors and promote positive youth development.

CTC draws on research from fields including social work, public health, psychology, education, medicine, criminology and organizational development. The system involves community stakeholders in setting prevention priorities based on local risk and protective factors, and tracks measurable outcomes over time.[1]

== Research base ==
=== Public health understanding of risk and protective factors ===
The field of public health has developed a systematic methodology for understanding and effectively preventing health problems. Through rigorous research, the etiology of diseases has been documented, and the factors contributing to those diseases have been identified. Once these contributing factors are understood, careful study and application of approaches to amend those factors have demonstrated reductions in the disease burden. For example, heart disease has been one of the primary causes of death among American adults. Research shows, however, that adequate exercise, a healthy diet, and avoidance of smoking can help to prevent heart disease. These behaviors are considered protective factors, just as smoking, high blood pressure, and a family history of heart disease are considered risk factors for poor heart health.

Since the late 1970s, researchers in a variety of disciplines (for example, criminology, sociology, social work, psychology, community psychology, education) have been applying this public health approach to the study of the healthy development of young people. This work has created a field called prevention science, which identifies the factors that contribute to the healthy development of children and youth (protective factors) and the factors that impede that development (risk factors).

=== Cause: Longitudinal studies of youth development ===
Protective Factors and the Social Development Model. The prevention of health and behavior problems in young people requires, at its foundation, the promotion of the factors required for positive development. Research shows that five basic factors promote positive social development: opportunities for developmentally appropriate involvement, skills, recognition for effort, improvement and achievement, strong social bonds, and clear, consistent standards for behavior. All children need opportunities to be actively involved with positive adults and peers, the skills to participate and succeed in social, school, and civic settings, and recognition for their efforts, improvements, and accomplishments. When young people are provided with opportunities, skills, and recognition, they develop strong social bonds, that is connections with and commitment to the families, schools, and communities that provided them. When families, schools, and communities communicate to young people clear standards for behavior, those who feel bonded, emotionally connected, invested in the group, will follow those standards that promote health and success. These five factors are protective factors that promote positive development in young people (Hawkins & Weis, 1985), and form the basis for the Social Development Model.

Risk Factors for Adolescent Problem Behavior Chart

Risk Factors. Research has also identified risk factors that can interrupt the process of positive social development. High quality longitudinal studies have identified risk factors in neighborhoods and communities, families, schools, and peer groups, as well as in individuals themselves. These factors increase the probability of delinquency, violence, substance abuse, teen pregnancy, dropping out of school, and other behavior problems in young people. The risk factors shown in the risk factor chart (right) have been found in at least two high-quality studies to predict later health and behavior problems in young people. Many of these risk factors predict multiple problems. For example, the risk factor of "Poor Family Management" has been shown to predict five youth problem behaviors: substance abuse, delinquency, teen pregnancy, school drop-out, and violence. Providing effective parent training programs in a community, therefore, could potentially impact all five of these undesirable outcomes.

=== Intervention: Testing effectiveness of interventions ===
The identification of risk and protective factors provides the foundation for advances in preventing adolescent health and behavior problems. Prevention scientists have rigorously tested programs and policies that address these risk and protective factors in studies funded largely by the National Institutes of Health, and an increasing number and range of effective prevention approaches have now been identified. By 2004, 56 tested and effective programs were available in the United States that have been demonstrated to reduce involvement in problem behaviors and/or increase positive outcomes for youth. These 56 effective programs and policies are summarized in CTC's Prevention Strategies Guide at https://www.communitiesthatcare.net/Prevention%20Strategies%20Guide/introduction.pdf. Sixteen of these programs have been tested at least twice with replicated findings and have been designated as Blueprint model programs, which, if rigorously followed, will significantly reduce youth violence and substance abuse. Programs range from prenatal (for example, Olds, 1997) and early childhood interventions (for example, Reid et al., 2001), to community policies related to alcohol (e.g. Holder et al., 2000), to school-based curricula that teach youth social and emotional skills that will help them navigate life (e.g. Botvin at al, 2003, Eisen at al., 2002, and Grossman et al., 1997).

=== Systems: Researching systems change in states and communities ===
Prevention scientists understand that the final task arising from these research findings is the application of proven prevention programs, policies and strategies in the real world in order to enhance youth development on the ground in communities. In collaboration with communities and state and federal governments, researchers are studying the impact that prevention science can have on the effectiveness of prevention efforts within those systems. [link to History section of this article, to be added]

== Description ==
=== Five Phases ===
Five Phases of CTC

Communities That Care guides the community's prevention efforts through a five-phase process which includes: 1) Get Started—assessing community readiness to undertake collaborative prevention efforts; 2) Get Organized—getting a commitment to the CTC process from community leaders and forming a diverse and representative prevention coalition; 3) Develop a Profile—using epidemiologic data to assess prevention needs; 4) Create a Plan—choosing tested and effective prevention policies, practices, and programs based on assessment data; and 5) Implement and Evaluate—implementing the new strategies with fidelity, in a manner congruent with the programs' theory, content, and methods of delivery, and evaluating progress over time.

CTC activities are planned and carried out by the CTC Community Board, a prevention coalition of community stakeholders who work together to promote positive youth outcomes. Board members participate in a series of six CTC training workshops in which they build their coalition and learn the skills needed to install the CTC system.

Working through the five phases of CTC provides the opportunity to increase communication, collaboration, and ownership among community members and service providers invested in healthy youth development.

Phase One: Getting Started. With technical assistance provided by a CTC trainer, a community catalyst and small group of advisors assess community readiness to undertake collaborative prevention efforts, and identify the stakeholders who need to be involved. Key activities in this phase include recruiting key leaders to serve as champions of the effort, obtaining school district support to conduct a youth survey to provide epidemiological data on risk, protection, and youth behaviors, and hiring a coordinator to manage CTC activities.

Phase Two: Organizing, Introducing, Involving. In Phase Two a diverse and representative prevention coalition is formed. Specific tasks for this phase include involving and educating stakeholders who were identified in Phase One; developing a vision for the future of the community's children, and putting an organizational structure in place to help the community move toward the vision. The first two CTC trainings are implemented in this phase: the Key Leader Orientation (KLO) and the Community Board Orientation (CBO). These trainings introduce prevention science to community stakeholders, and help community members create an appropriate structure for the Community Board.

Phase Three: Developing a Community Profile. This is the data collection phase, including a comprehensive community assessment of adolescent behaviors and current prevention services. This phase usually requires administration of the CTC Youth Survey . Members of the Risk and Protective Factor Assessment Work Group participate in the Community Assessment Training, in which they learn about key data sources for risk and protective factors (such as the student survey) and how to analyze the data. In communities already using the CTC Youth Survey, this training is tailored to help the work group interpret survey results and identify elevated risk factors, depressed protective factors, and problem behaviors prevalent among youth in the community. From this analysis, the work group recommends priority risk and protective factors for focused attention by the CTC Board.

The second component of the community profile is an assessment of current community programs, policies, and resources that address the prioritized risk and protective factors. The Resource Assessment workgroup is trained in assessment procedures during the Community Resource Assessment Training. The goals of the resource assessment are to identify existing evidence-based programs that address the priority factors, discern the gaps in existing program delivery, and recommend where new programs or policies are needed.

Phase Four: Creating a Community Action Plan. During the fourth phase of CTC, the results of the assessment process are reviewed by the full Community Board, and a community action plan is developed. The Community Plan Training (CPT) is provided to Community Boards during this phase. During this training, Board members select prevention policies and programs that target their prioritized risk factors to fill gaps in current prevention services. The CTC Prevention Strategies Guide is a tool used during this process. It describes prevention programs that have been demonstrated in at least one high quality research trial to be effective in changing risk, protection, and problem behaviors. Once program choices are made, CPT participants are trained to write an action plan that sets clear, measurable goals regarding anticipated outcomes, and also develop an evaluation plan.

Phase Five: Implementing and Evaluating the Community Action Plan. In this phase, the CTC Board implements selected strategies, and evaluates progress over time. Board members and staff for the selected preventive programs attend the final CTC training workshop, the Community Plan Implementation Training (CPIT), which emphasizes the importance of implementing prevention programs with fidelity; that is, ensuring that the programs' content, dosage, and manner of delivery adhere to the protocols identified by program developers. Participants also learn methods for tracking implementation progress, assessing desired changes in participants, and using this information to adjust implementation as needed to fulfill program objectives.

CTC is intended as an ongoing process. The process of monitoring implementation progress and community level changes in risk, protection and youth outcomes is repeated every two years. Based on a review of these data, CTC boards revise their action plans as needed.

=== Essential components ===
The CTC system is collaborative, proactive, science-based, and data driven, and provides structure, tools, training and technical assistance for coalitions.

Collaborative. CTC uses a coalition approach to address issues at the community level. The coalition will include a diverse group of stakeholders concerned with youth development (youth-serving agency staff, school representatives, health professionals, city leaders, law enforcement, United Way, other funding entities, neighborhood groups, business people, parents, media representatives, faith community members, youth, etc.) in applying prevention science principles to decisions affecting the community's youth. By providing a setting and common language for all stakeholders to discuss prevention, the model ensures that all voices in the community are heard and respected.

Proactive. Rather than reacting to problems once they have already occurred, CTC focuses on strengthening protections and decreasing risks in order to promote healthy youth development and decrease the likelihood of problem behaviors.

Science based. CTC is grounded in rigorous research from a variety of disciplines, including public health, sociology, psychology, criminology, and community psychology. This research has identified the predictors of youth problem behaviors, developed epidemiologic assessment tools for measuring those predictors in a community, and tested programs that work in addressing those predictors.

Data driven. The CTC system ensures local control of decisions based on local data and needs assessments, and flexibility to implement actions specific to the priorities identified by community members. The CTC system provides tools for measuring levels of risk and protective factors, selecting priority factors on which to focus a strategic plan, selecting appropriate prevention responses, and tracking progress toward desired changes in priority risk factors.

a. The CTC Youth Survey is the primary tool for needs assessment and monitoring. This is a confidential, schoolwide survey for students appropriate for Grades 6-12, that measures a majority of the risk and protective factors identified to predict youth problem behaviors. Coalition members use survey results from students in their community as well as community archival data to prioritize risk and protective factors for attention. The survey is re-administered every 2 years in order to monitor progress over time.

b. Effective program selection is another element of the data-driven process. Coalition members review policies and programs that have been tested and proven effective in addressing their priority factors. They consider the suitability of each program to the community's circumstances, and select prevention responses most likely to be successful in that environment. Information on program effectiveness is summarized in menus of effective programs, for example CTC's Prevention Strategies Guide and The Blueprint for Violence Prevention list of effective programs.

c. Monitoring of program implementation is the third element of the data-driven process. Throughout the implementation cycle of each prevention program or strategy, coalitions collect data to ensure that the program is delivered with fidelity to the original program design. This monitoring information is important, because without close replication, the effectiveness of these programs can be compromised (see, for example, Elliot & Mihalic, 2004). Monitoring implementation is also a management tool for identifying challenges that can be addressed before they lead to program failure.

Structure and tools. The CTC structure includes six training workshops and additional tools that help walk community members through each stage of the process. Training manuals are composed of modules that provide comprehensive information, exercises, and guidelines for each stage of the process. The Milestones and Benchmarks checklist functions as a roadmap for the entire effort. Milestones are major tasks that must be accomplished in each phase of CTC, and benchmarks provide essential steps toward achieving each of these major tasks. Booklets are available to help local leaders evaluate and address community readiness issues before initiating the process, and to explain the system to key leaders and potential board members.

Training and technical assistance. Successful CTC efforts include high-quality training and technical assistance from experienced and certified facilitators. Feinberg et al. (2004), Gomez et al. (2005) and Greenberg et al. (2005) studied the functioning and sustainability of CTC coalitions in Pennsylvania, and found three factors strongly related to effective coalition function: community organizational and motivational readiness, initial training, and ongoing technical assistance (TA). The Pennsylvania study also documented that the sustainability of the effort was predicted by the prevention knowledge of coalition members, the quality of coalition functioning, and their fidelity to the CTC model.

=== Online CTC materials ===
The Center for Substance Abuse Prevention provides all CTC materials free of charge at www.communitiesthatcare.net . Materials include:

- Introductory booklets for community members
  - Investing in Your Community's Youth: an Introduction to the Communities That Care System
  - Tools for Community Leaders: a Guidebook for Getting Started
- Training manuals and PowerPoint presentations for all 6 CTC training workshops
  - Key Leader Orientation
  - Community Board Orientation
  - Community Assessment Training
  - Community Resource Assessment Training
  - Community Plan Training
  - Community Plan Implementation Training
- CTC Youth Survey questionnaire and a scale construction dictionary. This is the primary tool for needs assessment and monitoring.
- Milestones and Benchmarks checklist tool which itemizes the steps needed to complete each phase of CTC.
- The Prevention Strategies Guide which provides detailed information on 56 prevention programs that have been tested and proven effective in addressing risk and protective factors and reducing youth problem behaviors.

=== Tested and effective programs ===
A cornerstone of effective community-level prevention involves the implementation of appropriate responses to the priority needs identified during the assessment phase of the process. The CTC system guides community groups to choose and implement appropriate tested and effective programs, policies, and practices in families, schools, and communities (see the CTC Prevention Strategies Guide and the Blueprints for Violence Prevention website). These programs have shown significant effects on minimizing youths' risky behaviors and enhancing positive choices.

== Evaluation results ==
=== Evaluation of implementation ===
The CYDS evaluated community efforts to faithfully implement (1) the core principles of the CTC prevention system, and (2) tested and effective prevention programs with respect to content and delivery specifications. The study found that CTC communities achieved high implementation fidelity at the system and program levels when supported by training and technical assistance in CTC. Control communities did not achieve these things. At the start of the CYDS, CTC and control communities did not differ in their use of a science-based approach to prevention. By the third year of the intervention, key leaders in CTC communities reported a higher stage of adoption of science-based prevention, relative to control communities. They also were willing to provide greater funding for prevention. Differences were sustained one year after the implementation phase of the trial ended. At this point, key leaders in CTC communities also reported significantly stronger community norms against adolescent drug use. The CTC Milestones and Benchmarks Survey was used to track progress in the implementation of core components of the CTC prevention system. In each year of the intervention, CTC communities enacted an average of 90% of the key features of the CTC prevention system, including developing a community board, prioritizing risk and protective factors, selecting tested and effective preventive interventions from the Communities That Care Prevention Strategies Guide, implementing selected implementation programs with fidelity, and periodically assessing risk and protective factors and child and adolescent well-being through surveys of students. One year after the implementation phase of the trial had ended, eleven of 12 CTC coalitions continued to operate in CTC communities. These coalitions continued to implement key CTC milestones and benchmarks to a significantly greater degree than coalitions in control communities, even without ongoing study-provided support. Control communities did not make this progress over time in completing CTC milestones and benchmarks, implementing scientifically proven prevention programs, and monitoring program impacts. Over the course of the trial, the 12 CTC communities demonstrated faithful implementation of 17 different school-based, after-school, and parenting interventions selected from a menu of 39 possible tested and effective programs for 5th through 9th grade students contained in the Communities That Care Prevention Strategies Guide. On average, CTC communities implemented 2.75 tested and effective prevention programs per year (range: 1-5). High rates of fidelity were achieved consistently over time with respect to adherence to program objectives and core components (average = 91-94% per year) and dosage (number, length, and frequency of intervention sessions; average = 93-95% per year). Faithful implementation continued two years after study support ended. CTC coalitions still offered significantly more tested and effective intervention programs, implemented them with high quality, monitored implementation to a significantly greater degree, and reached significantly more children and parents, compared to control coalitions.

=== Impact evaluations ===
- Pennsylvania

The Prevention Research Center at Pennsylvania State University has been studying the process and impact of the statewide CTC system since its inception in the early 1990s. Summaries of their findings will be posted here soon.

- Community Youth Development Study

The Community Youth Development Study (CYDS) is the first controlled experimental trial of the Communities That Care system. Twenty-four communities in 7 states agreed to participate in the study. These communities consisted of 12 matched pairs which had equivalent demographics and equivalent levels of youth risks and problem behaviors at the start of the study. Communities were randomly assigned to intervention or control conditions. The intervention communities received funding to hire a full-time community coordinator, who formed a community coalition that subsequently participated in the full cycle of CTC trainings. These communities then created community action plans, and were awarded up to $75,000 per year for the next four years to implement the tested, effective prevention strategies selected as part of the action planning process. Control communities continued prevention business as usual.

Hawkins et al. 2008, reported finding no significant differences between CTC and control communities in average levels of community-targeted risks among students in fifth grade, prior to the start of the CTC programs. By the third year of the intervention, key leaders in CTC communities reported a higher stage of adoption of science-based prevention, relative to control communities, . They also were willing to provide greater funding for prevention. Differences were sustained one year after the implementation phase of the trial ended. At this point, key leaders in CTC communities also reported significantly stronger community norms against adolescent drug use. The longitudinal panel youth in CTC and control communities reported similar levels of targeted risk in Grade 5, when the intervention began, but targeted risk exposure grew more slowly for youth in CTC communities between Grade 5 and Grade 10. Significantly lower levels of targeted risk were first reported by CTC panel youth 1.67 years into the intervention, in Grade 7, and have continued to be reported by CTC panel youth through Grade 10.

Panel youth from CTC and control communities also reported similar levels of delinquency, alcohol use, and cigarette smoking at Grade 5 baseline. However, between Grades 5 and 10, CTC had significant effects on the initiation of these behaviors by youth. Significant differences in the initiation of delinquency were first observed in the spring of Grade 7. Panel youth from CTC communities were 25% less likely than panel youth from control communities to initiate delinquent behavior, and they remained so in Grade 8. Significantly lower delinquency initiation rates were sustained through Grade 10, when panel youth from CTC communities were 17% less likely to initiate delinquency than panel youth from control communities.

Preventive effects on alcohol use and cigarette use were first observed in the spring of Grade 8, 2.67 years after intervention programs were implemented. Grade 8 youth from CTC communities were 32% less likely to initiate alcohol use, and 33% less likely to initiate cigarette smoking than Grade 8 youth from control communities (Hawkins et al., 2009). Preventive effects were again sustained through Grade 10 when CTC panel youth were 29% less likely to initiate alcohol use and 28% less likely to initiate cigarette smoking than panel youth from control communities.

Differences in the initiation of delinquency, alcohol use, and cigarette smoking from Grade 5 through Grade 10 led to cumulatively lower rates of initiation over time: 62% of 10th-grade youth in the panel from CTC communities had engaged in delinquent behavior compared with 70% of 10th-grade youth in the panel from control communities; 67% vs. 75% had initiated alcohol use; and 44% vs. 52% had smoked cigarettes. (insert illustration here).

CTC also significantly reduced the prevalence of youth problem behaviors in Grade 8 and Grade 10. In Grade 8, the prevalence of alcohol use in the past month, binge drinking (five or more drinks in a row) in the past two weeks, and the variety of delinquent behaviors committed in the past year were all significantly lower in CTC panel youth compared to control community panel youth. The CYDS also found significant effects of CTC in reducing the prevalence of cigarette use in the past month and delinquent behavior and violence in the past year in the spring of Grade 10.

Child Trends Research Brief: An overview of the Communities That Care system and up to date research information is available from Child Trends with an in depth research brief that can be found here . Other research is also available through the Child Trends Website.

Conclusions: CTC's theory of change hypothesizes that it takes from 2 to 5 years to observe community-level effects on risk factors, and 5 or more years to observe effects on adolescent delinquency or substance use [insert CTC timeline graphic]. These early findings from the first randomized community trial of CTC are promising, suggesting that CTC is slowing the usual developmental increase in adolescents' risk exposure. Longer follow-up measurements are needed to determine if CTC can significantly reduce community levels of delinquency and drug use as hypothesized. The Community Youth Development Study will collect additional data from these students in 2007 and 2008. These data will allow tests of CTC's effects on community rates of delinquency and substance use initiation among young people through the spring of grade 9, almost 5 years after CTC was introduced in the intervention communities and approximately 3 1/2 years after communities began implementing tested and effective prevention programs chosen through the CTC system.
