= School Based Prevention Programs =

School-based prevention programs provide school-wide education, skills training and supports intended to improve student success in school by teaching interpersonal and communication skills, increasing self-awareness, and reducing risk factors that lead to risky behaviors.

== Overview ==
Preventing mental health problems and promoting healthy behavior among youth has become a critical policy issue; it is estimated that 50% students will be identified with a mental health disorder by the age of 14. The Report of the Surgeon General’s Conference on Children’s Mental Health stated the importance of fostering a solid emotional foundation in children in order to facilitate learning. However, children and families face significant barriers to accessing and receiving community-based mental health services. As a result, schools have been identified as ideal avenues through which to reach youth. Universal prevention programs are offered to the general population, while selective prevention programs are intended for groups identified as at risk for developing a problem. This differentiates them from intervention or treatment programs, which are intended for individuals who already have a problem or meet criteria for a disorder.

== Approaches ==
A number of school-based programs have been developed to target specific outcomes, such as reducing incidences of bullying, substance use, and antisocial behavior. Others have been designed to foster positive youth development and improve academic performance. While each of these programs focuses on distinct issues and outcomes, research suggests that in adolescent-focused initiatives integrating training in communication skills, problem solving, insight building, and assertiveness training will bring improvements to multiple issues. These results suggest that certain core skills may be critical to seemingly disparate desired outcomes, which may have implications for clinical decision making as well as policy.

A meta-analysis of 213 school-based prevention programs promoting social and emotional learning (SEL) looked at outcomes in six different domains: social and emotional skills, attitudes toward self and others, positive social behaviors, conduct problems, emotional distress, and academic performance. Findings suggested that SEL programs had positive effects across all six domains, demonstrating the broad impact of universal school-based prevention programs.

The use of evidence-based programs has been shown to improve outcomes with research that suggests combining implementation of multiple programs into one comprehensive strategy achieves greater success overall.Prevention programs that are delivered over multiple years and that involve support from the local community are also more likely to lead to better outcomes and are the most-cost effective way to deliver prevention.

== Challenges ==
While 59% of schools in the U.S. report having programs that foster children’s social and emotional needs, evidence-based initiatives have not been widely implemented. Schools may be unaware of the evidenced-based programs that are available, reflecting the gap between research and practice. Schools that are aware of effective programs may lack funding necessary to implement the program. Should schools receive funding for implementation, research shows that programs are often poorly implemented, resulting in low fidelity and weak outcomes. Additionally, some prevention programs may not be a good fit with the local context and may require tailoring. Finally, schools may struggle to sustain programs due to limited resources and support.

== Implementation strategies ==
While there are significant challenges to implementing evidence-based prevention programs into school settings, there are strategies to increase the success of introducing and sustaining such programs. These strategies include assigning highly committed individuals as project directors or coordinators; encouraging support and cooperation from school administrators, community members and principals; motivating and gaining the support and enthusiasm of teachers; training which will provide knowledge, skills, and desire to continue further; retraining a few years after to reinforce knowledge and continue the commitment of the teacher or school; and gathering feedback to provide instructors with how to improve their skills

Properly implemented programs are likelier to have good outcomes, which may incentivize policymakers to allocate more funding to these initiatives. Including explicit cost-benefit analysis should be considered when designing programs. Having more structure in the program and implementation process - from training to materials to supervision - may also be beneficial and lead to sustainment.
