= J. David Hawkins =

American social work academic (born 1945)

- Born: John David Hawkins; September 16, 1945 (age 81)
- Education: Stanford University; Northwestern University
- Known for: Communities That Care
- Scientific career
- Fields: Social work
- Workplaces: University of Washington
- Thesis: Utopian values and communal social life: a comparative study of social arrangemerts in four counter culture communes established to realize participants' values (1975)

J. David Hawkins
- Born: United States
- Occupations: Sociologist, academic, and author
- Awards: Lifetime Achievement Award, Division of Experimental Criminology American Society of Criminology (2014); Joan McCord Award, American Academy of Experimental Criminology (2016); Distinguished Career Achievement Award, Society for Social Work Research (2019)

Academic background
- Education: Stanford University

Academic work
- Institutions: University of Washington, Seattle

J. David Hawkins (born 16 September 1945) is an American sociologist, academic, and author. He is Emeritus Endowed Professor of Prevention and founding director of the Social Development Research Group in the School of Social Work at the University of Washington. His research focuses on the prevention of behavior problems in children and adolescents. He developed the Communities That Care prevention system with Richard F. Catalano.

Hawkins is most known for his work on public health and criminology, primarily focusing on prevention science and risk factors. He has won several awards, including the 2012 Presidential Award from the Society for Prevention Research, 2014 Lifetime Achievement Award from the Division of Experimental Criminology at the American Society of Criminology, and 2019 Distinguished Career Achievement Award from the Society for Social Work Research. He has also authored books, including Delinquency and Crime: Current Theories. and Communities That Care: Building Community Engagement and Capacity to Prevent Youth Behavior Problems and his work has been published in academic journals, such as JAMA Pediatrics and Psychological Bulletin.

Hawkins is an elected fellow of the American Society of Criminology, Academy of Experimental Criminology, Society for Prevention Research, American Academy of Social Work and Social Welfare, and Society for Social Work Research, as well as an elected member of the Washington State Academy of Sciences.

== Education ==
Hawkins earned his Bachelor of Arts degree from Stanford University in 1967. He went on to pursue a Master of Arts in Sociology from Northwestern University, which he completed in 1969. Subsequently, he obtained his PhD in Sociology from the same institution in 1975.

== Career ==
Hawkins began his academic career in 1976 by joining the University of Washington, Seattle where he held various appointments spanning different departments and positions, including serving as a research assistant professor at the School of Social Work from 1976 to 1980. This was followed by an appointment as an assistant professor from 1980 to 1983. Subsequently, he served as an associate professor within the same school between 1983 and 1987, and as a professor from 1987 to 2000. Between 2000 and 2017, he served as the endowed professor of prevention at the School of Social Work while concurrently serving as an adjunct professor at the College of Education and at the Department of Sociology from 2003 to 2017. As of 2017, he is the emeritus endowed professor of prevention at the School of Social Work at the University of Washington, Seattle.

Between 1980 and 1984, he served as the co-director of National Center for the Assessment of Delinquent Behavior and Its Prevention followed by an appointment as the director of the Center for Social Welfare Research from 1984 to 1988. He was the founding director of the Social Development Research Group from 1988 to 2004.

== Research ==
Hawkins' criminology research has won him the 2016 Joan McCord Award from the American Academy of Experimental Criminology, and the 1999 August Vollmer Award for Outstanding Contributions to Criminal Justice from the American Society of Criminology. He has authored numerous publications spanning the areas of crime and delinquency, social problems and social policy, and adolescent development including books and articles in peer-reviewed journals.

=== Risk and protective factors ===
Hawkins' research has contributed to the understanding of risk and protective factors related to substance abuse, drugs, and alcohol, and delinquency, informing prevention, treatment, and policy efforts. Focusing his research efforts on the topic of adolescent alcohol and drug abuse prevention, his early research proposed a risk-focused approach involving identifying factors that increase the likelihood of substance abuse, understanding successful approaches to addressing these risk factors, and implementing these approaches in controlled studies with suitable high-risk and general population groups. In the early 2000s, he developed a self-reporting survey instrument to assess risk and protective factors as well as drug use and delinquent behaviors, across different environments, and conducted cross-national investigations on youth substance use in the Netherlands and the United States, demonstrating similar influences of risk and protective factors on youth behavioral outcomes despite varying policy approaches. He examined community-level factors in substance abuse prevention efforts, and conducted several surveys, suggesting that community-level prevention planning, informed by epidemiological data on community, school, and family risk and protective factors, can effectively reduce adolescent substance use by targeting areas of elevated risk and low protection with tested community-based preventive interventions. His investigation of gender differences in the association between risk and protective factors and self-reported serious delinquency revealed that boys' higher engagement in serious delinquency results from their exposure to increased risk and decreased protection, compared to girls. In his evaluation of the correlation between risk and protective factors in relation to problem behaviors including alcohol use, depressive symptoms, and antisocial behavior during adolescence, his study established that implementing preventive strategies that target factors influencing the likelihood of externalizing issues can also effectively reduce depressive symptoms in adolescents. His work in 2019 explored the connection between risk and protective factors and delinquency, substance use, and risky sexual behavior, revealing significant associations between various community, school, family, peer, and individual factors and behavior outcomes as well as between protective factors from family, school, peer, and individual spheres and behavior outcomes.

=== Preventive intervention studies ===
With Richard Catalano, Hawkins co-authored the social development model, a theory of social and antisocial development. His preventive intervention studies have led to the development of effective and equitable preventive interventions that promote social well-being and address the root causes of social problems. His preventive interventions include the parenting programs Guiding Good Choices, Supporting School Success, and Staying Connected with Your Teen; the school-based program, Raising Healthy Children; and the community prevention system, Communities That Care.

Hawkins’ preventive parenting curriculum to combat adolescent substance use, now called Guiding Good Choices highlights the importance of proactive communication within families, decreased negative family interaction, and improved observable parent-child relationship quality. He examined the long term effects of the Raising Healthy Children school based preventive intervention involving parents and teachers in the Seattle Social Development Project. He found that the intervention delivered when participants were in grades 1 through 6 positively impacted various aspects of early adulthood, encompassing academic, and occupational performance, emotional and mental well-being, as well as displaying effects in reducing crime and substance use by the age of 21. His evaluation of the long-term effects of the social development intervention found that it had a positive impact on mental well-being, education, sexual health, and economic accomplishments, which persisted through age 39. An assessment of the long-term effects of the Raising Healthy Children intervention also found that it enhanced not only future adult performance but also the well-being of participants' children, reducing the prevalence of developmental delays and adolescent drug use and increasing their academic, cognitive and social and emotional skills as rated by teachers unaware of their parent's involvement in the Seattle Social Development Project.

Hawkins and his colleague, Richard F. Catalano, developed the Communities That Care prevention system and tested it in a community randomized field experiment involving over 4000 participants followed from grade 5 through age 23 from 24 communities across seven states. He found that the CTC alliances maintained a high level of fidelity in implementing the CTC system even 20 months after the study's support for the intervention was withdrawn. The experiment found significant population-level reductions in the initiation of drug use and antisocial behaviors that persisted through age 23.

=== Youth development ===
Hawkins' research has included a focus on the factors that influence positive youth development. His examination of youth development programs in the United States, elucidated the shift in approach from a singular problem-focused perspective to an emphasis on factors that impacted both positive and problem youth development. In related research, he assessed the importance of combining the 'prevention science' and 'positive youth development' approaches, highlighting the need to prioritize risk and protection in preventing adolescent behavior problems and promoting positive youth development.

== Awards and honors ==
- 1987 – Outstanding Achievement by a Scholar Award, Washington Council on Crime and Delinquency
- 1988 – Outstanding Contribution Award, California Association of County Drug Program Administrators for Work in the Area of Research and Evaluation
- 1996 – Seventh Annual Award of Excellence, National Prevention Network for Outstanding Contribution to the Field of Prevention
- 1998 – Edith A. Lobe Award for Citizen Volunteerism, Washington Council on Crime and Delinquency.
- 1999 – Prevention Science Award, Society for Prevention Research
- 1999 – August Vollmer Award for Outstanding Contributions to Criminal Justice, American Society of Criminology
- 2001 – Communities That Care Special Recognition Award, State of Pennsylvania
- 2003 – Paul Tappan Award for Outstanding Contributions to the Field of Criminology, Western Society of Criminology
- 2012 – Presidential Award, Society for Prevention Research
- 2012 – Joseph E. Zins Award for Action Research in Social and Emotional Learning, Collaborative for Academic, Social and Emotional Learning (CASEL)
- 2014 – Lifetime Achievement Award, Division of Experimental Criminology American Society of Criminology
- 2016 – Joan McCord Award, American Academy of Experimental Criminology
- 2019 – Distinguished Career Achievement Award, Society for Social Work Research

== Bibliography ==
=== Books ===
- Communities That Care: Action for Drug Abuse Prevention (1992) ISBN 9781555424718
- Delinquency and Crime: Current Theories (1996) ISBN 9780521478946
- Communities That Care: Building community engagement and capacity to prevent youth behavior problems (2018) ISBN 9780190299224

=== Selected articles ===
- Hawkins, J. D., Catalano, R. F., & Miller, J. Y. (1992). Risk and protective factors for alcohol and other drug problems in adolescence and early adulthood: implications for substance abuse prevention. Psychological Bulletin, 112(1), 64.
- Coie, J. D., Watt, N. F., West, S. G., Hawkins, J. D., Asarnow, J. R., Markman, H. J., ... & Long, B. (1993). The science of prevention: a conceptual framework and some directions for a national research program. American Psychologist, 48(10), 1013.
- Catalano, R. F., & Hawkins, J. D. (1996). The social development model: a theory of antisocial behavior. In Hawkins, J. D. (Ed.). (1996). Delinquency and Crime: Current Theories. New York: Cambridge University Press.
- Catalano, R. F., Hawkins, J. D., Kosterman, R., Bailey, J. A., Oesterle, S., Cambron, C., & Farrington, D. P. (2021). Applying the social development model in middle childhood to promote healthy development: Effects from primary school through the 30s and across generations. Journal of Developmental and Life-Course Criminology, 7, 66–86.
- Catalano, R. F., Berglund, M. L., Ryan, J. A., Lonczak, H. S., & Hawkins, J. D. (2004). Positive youth development in the United States: Research findings on evaluations of positive youth development programs. The Annals of the American Academy of Political and Social Science, 591(1), 98–124.
- Kuklinski, M. R., Oesterle, S., Briney, J. S., & Hawkins, J. D. (2021). Long-term impacts and benefit-cost analysis of the Communities That Care prevention system at age 23, 12 years after baseline. Prevention Science, 22, 452–463.
