= Prevention science =

Scientific study of preventing human dysfunctions

Prevention science is the application of a scientific methodology that seeks to prevent or moderate major human dysfunctions before they occur. Regardless of the type of issue on hand, the factors that lead to the problem must be identified and addressed. Prevention research is thus focused primarily on the systematic study of these potential precursors of dysfunction, also known as risk factors; as well as components or circumstances that reduces the probability of problem development in the presence of risk, also known as protective factors. Preventive interventions aim to counteract risk factors and reinforce protective factors in order to disrupt processes or situations that give rise to human or social dysfunction.

== Components of prevention science ==
Epidemiology

The prevalence, distribution, and determinants of the problem in time and space. Epidemiological investigations can be carried out through surveillance and descriptive studies to determine its extent.

Etiology

The causes of such positive or negative outcomes, with an emphasis on risk and protective factors. Also known as the Theory of Causation.

Efficacy trials

Scientific experiments that test the preventive intervention programs ability to prevent the problem under favorable conditions. Under these optimal conditions, the researcher has control over the intervention and how it is delivered. If the test finds significant desirable effects, the intervention program is considered to be efficacious.

Effectiveness trials

Scientific experiments that test the preventive intervention programs ability to prevent the problem under real world conditions. The setting and the kinds of people in the experiment should be very similar to the actual targeted population in a particular location.

Dissemination research

Analyzes how tested and effective prevention intervention programs may be spread to reduce problems at a larger scale.

== Usefulness of risk factors ==
The term "risk factor" was first coined Dr. William B. Kannel in a 1961 article in Annals of Internal Medicine. Dr. Kannel was the epidemiologist who discovered most of the major risk factors for cardiovascular disease while working on the Framingham Heart Study in Massachusetts.

There are 2 useful ways to utilize risk factors in prevention science:

1. To identify subpopulations more likely to develop problems which should be reached by preventive intervention.
2. To identify malleable individual or environmental characteristics that can be changed by preventive intervention.

== Further observations about risk and protective factors ==
- Different forms of dysfunction are typically related to many different risk factors, rather than a single risk factor. On the other hand, a single risk factor may lead to a variety of consequences in different settings.
- Risk factors have compounding effects on an individual. The risk of dysfunction seems to increase exponentially with each additional exposure to a new risk factor.
- Some risk factors may predict dysfunction only at specific periods of development, while others stay constant throughout one's lifespan. As a general rule, prediction is best made from proximal risk factors.
- Diverse disorders may share common fundamental risk factors. For example, marital discord has been found to precede both conduct problems in children and depression among women.

== Levels of prevention ==
In defining the level of prevention in the public health sector, R.S. Gordon, Jr. proposed 3 classifications based upon the costs and benefits of delivering the intervention to the target population group.

Tier	Definition
Universal prevention	Strategies that involves the full population (nation, local community, school, district, etc.) based on evidence that it is likely to provide some benefit to all. It aims to prevent or delay the use of alcohol, tobacco, and other substances. All individuals, without screening, are provided with information and skills needed to prevent the problem. Also include environmental strategies such as policies that change the availability and/or price of such problematic substances.
Selective prevention	Strategies that involve targeted subpopulations whose risk of developing problems such as alcohol use disorder is already at an elevated level above average. Targeted groups may be identified by exposure to specific risk factors such as poor family management, family history, or impulsive behaviors. An example of selective prevention is parenting programs for children with early conduct problems.
Indicated prevention	Strategies that involve a screening process, and aim to identify individuals who exhibit early signs of early conduct problems and/or having an increased risk for a disorder, but currently do not have a diagnosable disorder. Identifiers may include falling grades among students, known problem consumption or conduct disorders, alienation from parents, school, and positive peer groups etc.

Selective and indicated prevention strategies might involve more intensive interventions and thus involve greater cost to the participants, since their risk and thus potential benefit from participation would be greater.

== Guidelines for prevention ==
The following guidelines for prevention science was established by an undergraduate social welfare class titled "Advances in Prevention Science: Bridging the Gap from Science to Service" at the University of Washington in Seattle during the winter quarter of 2012. It was taught by Dr. J. David Hawkins, one of the developers for the Social Development Model.

=== Foundation guidelines ===
- Start prevention early before a problem arises.
- Prevention interventions should include and reach those at high risk for the problem.
- Address malleable risk factors for the problem to be prevented.
- Strengthen malleable protective factors against the problem.
- Base prevention program in a clear and believable theory of change.
- Ensure adequate financing for full implementation by utilizing cost-benefit analyses.

=== Intervention guidelines ===
- Specify clear goals with specific and measurable objectives.
- Build a community of support for the intervention (parents, teachers, community members, policy makers, etc.).
- Choose interveners who are trusted, respected people whom recipients will listen to and develop a relationship with.
- Provide a standard protocol or manual for intervention activities that is easily available.
- Allow flexible implementation of protocol to meet needs of the program.
- Provide proper and adequate training for the interveners on the program protocols.
- Provide referrals to other services if needed by participants.
- Make services available and accessible to clients in their local community.
- Ensure intervention is culturally competent for the target population.
- Specify the duration of the intervention and provide sufficient amount to achieve a positive behavior change.
- Document all activities occurring during the program in order to monitor fidelity.

=== Convincing evidence guidelines ===
- The preventive intervention has been tested in a randomized controlled trial; or with an interrupted time series design with enough data points before and after intervention to allow threats to internal validity of results to be ruled out; or with a quasi-experimental design with a comparison group in which the researchers have ruled out plausible threats to internal validity.
- The population in which the preventive intervention was tested was properly described.
- The trial found outcomes that were statistically significant improvements for the intervention group compared to the control group.
- The trial experienced little or no differential attrition from intervention versus control condition.
- Longitudinal follow up of participants and controls found sustained effects.
- The intervention was found to be most effective with those at highest risk of the problem.
- Results have been replicated in two or more trials.
- Trial may or may not be conducted by an independent evaluator.

== Effects on adolescent health ==
Behavior problems are major causes of adolescent morbidity and mortality, and Prevention Science has led to the identification of tested and effective preventive interventions. Longitudinal studies have provided an understanding of risk and protective factors across the life course for many of these problem behaviors. An article by Richard Catalano, director of the University of Washington's Social Development Research Group, was recently published in the medical journal The Lancet, whereby Catalano and his colleagues provided examples of cost-effective social programs that have undergone rigorous research to show that implementing such programs can prevent a variety of behavioral problems and conditions contributing to poor health in today's youth. The paper was published on April 25, 2012 as part of a series on adolescent health.
Samples of their recommended programs are:

- The Nurse Family Partnership program, which provides regular home visits with nurses to poor, first-time mothers. The program led to 43 percent fewer subsequent pregnancies and decreased the mothers' welfare use, smoking and arrests. As the children grew up, they drank less alcohol, were less likely to be arrested and had fewer sex partners than children whose mothers were not in the program.
- The Gatehouse Project, including a curriculum focused on building social, problem-solving and coping skills in schoolchildren and more positive classroom and school-wide environments, led to decreased smoking and other substance use and delayed the onset of sexual intercourse in adolescents.
- In low-income countries, the Conditional cash transfer programs, paid school fees and gave about $10 a month to mothers to ensure their children attend school. As a result, more girls stayed in school and adolescent pregnancies declined.

== Case study: nurse family partnership ==
The Nurse Family Partnership (NFP) is an evidence-based community health program that was developed by Dr. David Olds in Elmira, New York in 1977. NFP provides regular home visits by specially trained public health nurses to low-income, unmarried pregnant women with no previous live births. The nurses teach positive health related behaviors, competent care of children, and maternal personal development encompassing family, education, and economic self-sufficiency, instilling confidence and empowering them to achieve a better life for their children and themselves. All of these services are free and voluntary, and goes on until the first-born child reaches 2 years of age.

=== Evidence of effectiveness ===
Three randomized controlled trials were conducted with 3 diverse populations in Elmira, New York (1977); in Memphis, Tennessee (1988); and in Denver, Colorado (1994). These research studies provide evidence on the positive and effective outcomes of NFP. Follow-up research still continues today, which studies the long-term outcomes for both mothers and children in these trials.

==== Study 1: Elmira, NY ====
300 women in a semi-rural community, who had agreed to be part of the study were randomly assigned to either a group that will participate in the Nurse-Family Partnership, or a control group that was only provided developmental screening and referral to treatment for their child. Approximately 90% of the women were caucasian; 60% were from low-income families; 60% unmarried. Average age of the women in the study was 19.

===== Effects on child =====
Versus the control group:

- 48% fewer officially verified incidents of child abuse and neglect as of age 15 (an average of 0.26 incidents per nurse-visited child versus 0.50 per control-group child).
- 43% less likely to have been arrested, and 58% less likely to have been convicted, as of age 19 (21% of nurse-visited children had been arrested versus 37% of control-group children, and 12% versus 28% had been convicted, according to self-reports).
- 57% fewer lifetime arrests and 66% fewer lifetime convictions, as of age 19 (an average of 0.37 versus 0.86 arrests, and 0.20 versus 0.58 convictions, according to self reports).
- No significant effect on recent substance use (per self-reports at age 19).
- No significant effect on high school graduation rates (per self-reports at age 19).
- No significant effect on likelihood of becoming pregnant or giving birth, or causing a pregnancy or birth (per self-reports at age 19).
- No significant effect on percent engaged in economically productive activities at age 19 (e.g., work or school), or on lifetime use of welfare or other public assistance, per self-reports.

===== Effects on mother =====
Versus the control group:

- 20% less time spent on welfare (an average of 53 months per nurse-visited woman versus 66 months per woman in the control group). This effect was statistically significant at the .10 level, but not the .05 level.
- 19% fewer subsequent births (an average of 1.3 births versus 1.6).
- 61% fewer self-reported arrests (an average of 0.13 versus 0.33).
- 72% fewer self-reported convictions (an average of 0.05 versus 0.18).
- There were no significant effects on months employed, months on food stamps or Medicaid, or behavior-impairing substance use disorders.

===== Study quality =====
There was a long-term follow-up of children whose mother was part of the initial NFP effectiveness study. There was low attrition as the data on the outcomes described above were obtained for 77%-83% of the initial sample group, and follow-up rates were similar for both treatment and control groups.

==== Study 2: Memphis, TN ====
743 women who had agreed to participate in the study were randomly assigned to either a treatment group that would be given the opportunity to participate in the Nurse Family Partnership, or a control group that was only provided free transportation to scheduled prenatal medical appointments, and developmental screening, as well as referrals to treatment for their child under the age of 2 years old. 92% of the women were African-American; 85% came from households with income on or under the poverty line; 98% were unmarried; average age was 18.

===== Effects on child at age 2 =====
Versus the control group:

- 23% fewer health care encounters for injuries or ingestions (an average of 0.43 encounters per child in the treatment group vs. 0.56 in the control group).
- 78% fewer days hospitalized for injuries or ingestions (an average of 0.04 days in the treatment group vs. 0.18 days in the control group).

===== Effects on child at age 12 =====
Versus the control group:

- 67% less likely to have smoked cigarettes, consumed alcohol, or used marijuana in the past month.
- 28% less likely to have an internalizing disorder, such as depression or anxiety (22.1% in the treatment group vs. 30.9% in the control group).

For nurse-visited children in the subsample whose mothers had low psychological resources prior to the program participation (mothers in the lower half of the sample in intelligence, mental health, and self-confidence), research found that the children made improvements in academic performance. The effects on academic performance were sustained over the follow-up period, including grades 4–6. Compared to the control group in the same subsample:

- Scored 6 percentile points higher on the Tennessee state reading and math achievement tests in grades 1-6 (41st percentile for children in the treatment group vs. 35th percentile for children in the control group).
- Had 8% higher reading and math GPA in grades 1-6 (an average GPA of 2.46 for children in the treatment group vs. 2.27 for children in the control group).

===== Effects on mother when child reached age 12 =====
Versus the control group:

- 9% reduction in time on welfare during the 12 years of having their first child (5.0 months/year for the treatment group vs. 5.5 months/year for the control group).
- 9% reduction in time on food stamps during the 12 years of having their first child (6.3 months/year for the treatment group vs. 6.9 months/year for the control group).
- 10% reduction in annual government spending per person on welfare, food stamps, and Medicaid during the 12 years of having their first child.
- 16% reduction in subsequent births during the first 6 years of their first child's life (an average of 1.08 for the treatment group vs. 1.28 for the control group).

===== Study quality =====
This was a large study with follow-up all the way till the first child reached age 12. There was low-moderate attrition; data obtained were for 74-85% of the original sample, and follow-up rates were similar for both the treatment and control groups.

==== Study 3: Denver, CO ====
490 women who had agreed to participate in the program was randomly assigned to either a treatment group that would be given the opportunity to participate in the Nurse Family Partnership, or a control group that was only provided developmental screening and referrals to treatment for their child under the age of 2 years old. 46% were Mexican-American; 36% were caucasian; 15% African American; 84% were unmarried; average age was 20.

===== Effects on child at age 4 =====
Versus the control group, the subsample of children whose mothers had low psychological resources prior to participating in the program made sizable gains in researcher assed language development; behavioral adaptation (attention, impulse control, sociability); executive functioning (capacity for sustained attention, fine gross motor skills);

===== Effects on mother when child reached age 4 =====
Versus the control group:

- 20% longer interval between the women's 1st and 2nd births (24.5 months for the treatment group women vs. 20.4 months for the control group women).
- Lower percentage of women experienced domestic violence from their partner in the past 6 months (7% in the treatment group vs. 14% in the control group).

===== Discussion of study quality =====
- This was a large study with a moderately long-term follow-up of age 4 for the first-born child.
- Low attrition rate as the data on the outcomes were obtained for 82-86% of the original sample, and follow-up rates were similar for both treatment and control groups.
- The study measured outcomes for all mothers and children that were originally assigned to the nurse-visited treatment group regardless of how long they participated in the program.
- The children's mental development and language skills were measured through assessments whose reliability and validity are well-established, such as the Preschool Language Scales-3.
- The research staff administering these assessments and outcomes were blind to the group assignments.

== Advancement in prevention science ==
=== National Prevention Science Coalition ===
The National Prevention Science Coalition to Improve Lives (NPSC) was formed in 2013 as a 501(c)(3) non-profit organization to promote the application of validated, science-based findings to wide-scale, effective implementation of prevention practices and policies. In doing so, they address several areas of concern, such as mental and behavioral health, education, and environmental influences. Additionally, they address adverse social conditions that contribute to both behavioral problems (e.g., poor self-regulation, substance use and excessive alcohol use, violence) and major chronic illnesses (e.g., asthma, diabetes, obesity, heart disease) that originate in childhood and become compounded in adulthood. Given that behavioral, mental and physical health problems are highly concentrated in high poverty neighborhoods, the NPSC has prioritized the reduction of poverty and its ill effects. Criminal and juvenile justice issues are also a matter of concern to them. Effective prevention of these multiple problems requires fostering environments from the prenatal period onward that nurture child and adolescent successful development.

The NPSC, directed by Dr. Diana Fishbein and Dr. John Roman, is composed of scientists, educators, practitioners and clinicians, policy makers, foundation representatives, and affiliated organizations, housed at the Pennsylvania State University. They work in a nonpartisan manner with Congressional offices and Caucuses and collaborate with like-minded groups and federal agency administrators in a mutual advisory capacity. They invite individuals and organizations to join in this effort. There is no cost to membership; involvement at any level is welcomed. To register, click here: http://www.npscoalition.org/register

=== Society for Prevention Research ===
Society For Prevention Research is an organization dedicated to advancing scientific investigation on the etiology and prevention of social, physical and mental health, and academic problems and on the translation of that information to promote health and well being. The multi-disciplinary membership of SPR is international and includes scientists, practitioners, advocates, administrators, and policy makers who value the conduct and dissemination of prevention science worldwide. The Society for Prevention Research has commissioned a series of task forces around building standards of evidence and knowledge in prevention science. The official publication of the organization, called Prevention Science, serves as an interdisciplinary forum designed to disseminate new developments in the theory, research and practice of prevention. Prevention sciences encompassing etiology, epidemiology and intervention are represented through peer-reviewed original research articles on a variety of health and social problems, including but not limited to substance use disorder, mental health, HIV/AIDS, violence, accidents, teenage pregnancy, suicide, delinquency, STD's, obesity, diet/nutrition, exercise, and chronic illness. The journal also publishes literature reviews, theoretical articles, and papers concerning new developments in methodology.

=== Washington State Institute for Public Policy ===
Washington State Institute for Public Policy (WSIPP) located in Olympia, Washington, estimates the cost-effectiveness of diverse prevention programs with scientifically rigorous standards applied consistently across a wide variety of social issues relevant to state legislators. Cost-benefit analyses are important to show the economic benefit to the state and to tax-payers, as well as provide a standard to compare between different programs with similar goals and outcomes. Furthermore, cost-effective programs are more likely to be funded and approved by policy makers.

=== Blueprints for Violence Prevention ===
Blueprints for Violence Prevention is a project of the Center for the Study and Prevention of Violence at the University of Colorado that provides a list of effective violence, drug, and crime prevention programs. The Blueprints mission is to identify truly outstanding violence and drug prevention programs that meet a high scientific standard of effectiveness. In doing so, Blueprints serves as a resource for governments, foundations, businesses, and other organizations trying to make informed judgments about their investments in violence and drug prevention programs. Blueprints staff systematically and continuously review the research on violence and substance use programs to determine which are exemplary and grounded in evidence. To date, it has assessed more than 900 programs. Blueprints' standards for certifying model and promising violence prevention programs are widely recognized as the most rigorous in use. Program effectiveness is based upon an initial review by Blueprints staff and a final review and recommendation from a distinguished Advisory Board, composed of experts in the field of violence prevention.

=== Social Research Unit ===
The Social Research Unit is an independent charity based in Dartington, England, dedicated to improving the health and development of children in Europe and North America. They do so by utilizing research to first establish potential causes of impairment, and then to develop and disseminate appropriate information to the widest international audience regarding their findings about responding more effectively to risk.

=== Social Development Research Group ===
The Social Development Research Group (SDRG) is a nationally recognized interdisciplinary team of researchers based in Seattle, Washington that seek to promote youth development, as well as prevent and treat health and behavior problems among young people through identifying risk and protective factors and understanding the effects of promotive and preventive interventions that address these factors. Academic success and positive development as well as substance use, delinquency, risky sexual behavior, violence, mental health problems and school dropout are among the outcomes studied. In 1979, J. David Hawkins and Richard F. Catalano began to develop the Social Development Model which provides the theoretical basis for this approach to promotion and prevention which underlies much of the group's research.
