= Social alienation =

Disconnection in social relationships

Social alienation is a person's feeling of disconnection from a group – whether friends, family, or wider society – with which the individual has an affiliation. Such alienation has been described as "a condition in social relationships reflected by (1) a low degree of integration or common values and (2) a high degree of distance or isolation (3a) between individuals, or (3b) between an individual and a group of people in a community or work environment [enumeration added]". It is a sociological concept developed by several classical and contemporary theorists. The concept has many discipline-specific uses and can refer both to a personal psychological state (subjectively) and to a type of social relationship (objectively).

== History ==
The term alienation has been used over the ages with varied and sometimes contradictory meanings. In ancient history it could mean a metaphysical sense of achieving a higher state of contemplation, ecstasy or union—becoming alienated from a limited existence in the world, in a positive sense. Examples of this usage have been traced to neoplatonic philosophers such as Plotinus (in the Greek alloiosis). There have also long been religious concepts of being separated or cut off from God and the faithful, alienated in a negative sense. The New Testament mentions the term apallotrioomai in Greek—"being alienated from". Ideas of estrangement from a Golden Age, or due to a fall of man, or approximate equivalents in differing cultures or religions, have also been described as concepts of alienation. A double positive and negative sense of alienation is broadly shown in the spiritual beliefs referred to as Gnosticism.

Alienation also had a particular legal-political meaning since as early as Ancient Roman times, where to alienate property (alienato) is to transfer ownership of it to someone else. The term alienation itself comes from the Latin alienus which meant 'of another place or person', which in turn came from alius, meaning "other" or "another". Another usage of the term in Ancient Greco-Roman times was by physicians referring to disturbed, difficult or abnormal states of mind, generally attributed to imbalanced physiology. In Latin alienatio mentis (mental alienation), this usage has been dated to Asclepiades. Once translations of such works had resurfaced in the West in the 17th century, physicians again began using the term, which is typically attributed to Felix Platter.

In medieval times, a relationship between alienation and social order has been described, mediated in part by mysticism and monasticism. The Crusades and witch-hunts have been described as forms of mass alienation.

=== 17th century ===
In the 17th century, Hugo Grotius put forward the concept that everyone has 'sovereign authority' over themselves but that they could alienate that natural right to the common good, an early social contract theory. In the 18th century, Hutcheson introduced a distinction between alienable and unalienable rights in the legal sense of the term. Rousseau published influential works on the same theme, and is also seen as having popularized a more psychological-social concept relating to alienation from a state of nature due to the expansion of civil society or the nation state.

In the same century a law of alienation of affection was introduced for men to seek compensation from other men accused of taking away 'their' woman.

In the history of literature, the German Romantics appear to be the first group of writers and poets in whose work the concept of alienation is regularly found. Around the start of the 19th century, Hegel popularized a Christian (Lutheran) and Idealist philosophy of alienation. He used German terms in partially different senses, referring to a psychological state and an objective process, and in general posited that the self was a historical and social creation, which becomes alienated from itself via a perceived objective world, but can become de-alienated again when that world is seen as just another aspect of the self-consciousness, which may be achieved by self-sacrifice to the common good.

Around the same time, Pinel was popularizing a new understanding of mental alienation, particularly through his 'medical-philosophical treatise'. He argued that people could be disturbed (alienated) by emotional states and social conditions, without necessarily having lost (become alienated from) their reason, as had generally been assumed. Hegel praised Pinel for his 'moral treatment' approach, and developed related theories. Nevertheless, as Foucault would later write, "... in an obscure, shared origin, the 'alienation' of physicians and the 'alienation' of philosophers started to take shape—two configurations in which man in any case corrupts his truth, but between which, after Hegel, the nineteenth century stopped seeing any trace of resemblance."

=== Marx ===
Marx was initially in the Young Hegelian camp and, like Feuerbach, rejected the spiritual basis, and adapted Hegel's dialectic model to a theory of (historical) materialism. Marx's theory of alienation is articulated most clearly in the Economic and Philosophic Manuscripts of 1844 and The German Ideology (1846). The 'young' Marx wrote more often and directly of alienation than the 'mature' Marx, which some regard as an ideological break while others maintain that the concept remained central. Structuralists generally hold that there was a transition from a philosophical-anthropological (Marxist humanism) concept (e.g. internal alienation from the self) to a structural-historical interpretation (e.g. external alienation by appropriation of labor), accompanied by a change in terminology from alienation to exploitation to commodity fetishism and reification. Marx's concepts of alienation have been classed into four types by Kostas Axelos: economic and social alienation, political alienation, human alienation, and ideological alienation.

In the concept's most prominent use, it refers to the economic and social alienation aspect in which workers are disconnected from what they produce and why they produce. Marx believed that alienation is a systematic result of capitalism. Essentially, there is an "exploitation of men by men" where the division of labor creates an economic hierarchy. His theory of alienation was based upon his observation that in emerging industrial production under capitalism, workers inevitably lose control of their lives and selves by not having any control of their work. Workers never become autonomous, self-realized human beings in any significant sense, except in the way the bourgeoisie wants the worker to be realized. His theory relies on Feuerbach's The Essence of Christianity (1841), which argues that the idea of God has alienated the characteristics of the human being. Stirner would take the analysis further in The Ego and Its Own (1844), declaring that even 'humanity' is an alienating ideal for the individual, to which Marx and Engels responded in The German Ideology (1845). Alienation in capitalist societies occurs because in work each contributes to the common wealth but they can only express this fundamentally social aspect of individuality through a production system that is not publicly social but privately owned, for which each individual functions as an instrument, not as a social being. Kostas Axelos summarizes that for Marx, in capitalism "work renders man an alien to himself and to his own products." "The malaise of this alienation from the self means that the worker does not affirm himself but denies himself, does not feel content but unhappy....The worker only feels himself outside his work, and in his work he feels outside himself....Its alien character emerges clearly in the fact as soon as no physical or other compulsion exists, it is avoided like the plague." Marx also wrote, in a curtailed manner, that capitalist owners also experience alienation, through benefiting from the economic machine by endlessly competing, exploiting others and maintaining mass alienation in society.

Political alienation refers specifically to the idea that "politics is the form that organizes the productive forces of the economy" in a way that is alienating because it "distorts the logic of economic development".

Through human alienation, individuals become estranged to themselves in the quest to stay alive, where "they lose their true existence in the struggle for subsistence". Marx focuses on two aspects of human nature which he calls "historical conditions." The first aspect refers to the necessity of food, clothes, shelter, and more. Secondly, Marx believes that after satisfying these basic needs people have the tendency to develop more "needs" or desires that they will work towards satisfying, hence, humans become stuck in a cycle of never ending wants which makes them strangers to each other.

When referring to ideological alienation, Axelos proposes that Marx believes that all religions divert people away from "their true happiness" and instead turn them towards "illusory happiness".

There is a commonly noted problem of translation in grappling with ideas of alienation derived from German-language philosophical texts: the word alienation, and similar words such as estrangement, are often used interchangeably to translate two distinct German words, Entfremdung and Entäußerung. The former means specifically interpersonal estrangement, while the latter can have a broader and more active meaning that might refer also to externalization, relinquishment, or sale (alienation) of property. In general, and contrary to his predecessors, Marx may have used the terms interchangeably, though he also wrote "Entfremdung... constitutes the real interest of this Entäußerung."

=== Late 1800s to 1900s ===
Many sociologists of the late 19th and early 20th centuries were concerned about alienating effects of modernization. German sociologists Georg Simmel and Ferdinand Tönnies wrote critical works on individualization and urbanization. Simmel's The Philosophy of Money describes how relationships become more and more mediated by money. Tönnies' Gemeinschaft and Gesellschaft (Community and Society) is about the loss of primary relationships such as familial bonds in favour of goal-oriented, secondary relationships. This idea of alienation can be observed in some other contexts, although the term may not be as frequently used. In the context of an individual's relationships within society, alienation can mean the unresponsiveness of society as a whole to the individuality of each member of the society. When collective decisions are made, it is usually impossible for the unique needs of each person to be taken into account.

The American sociologist C. Wright Mills conducted a major study of alienation in modern society with White Collar in 1951, describing how modern consumption-capitalism has shaped a society where you have to sell your personality in addition to your work. Melvin Seeman was part of a surge in alienation research during the mid-20th century when he published his paper, "On the Meaning of Alienation", in 1959. Seeman used the insights of Marx, Emile Durkheim and others to construct what is often considered a model to recognize the five prominent features of alienation: powerlessness, meaninglessness, normlessness, isolation and self-estrangement. Seeman later added a sixth element (cultural estrangement), although this element does not feature prominently in later discussions of his work.

In a broader philosophical context, especially in existentialism and phenomenology, alienation describes the inadequacy of the human being (or the mind) in relation to the world. The human mind (as the subject who perceives) sees the world as an object of perception, and is distanced from the world, rather than living within it. This line of thought is generally traced to the works of Søren Kierkegaard in the 19th century, who, from a Christian viewpoint, saw alienation as separation from God, and also examined the emotions and feelings of individuals when faced with life choices.

Many 20th-century philosophers (both theistic and atheistic) and theologians were influenced by Kierkegaard's notions of angst, despair and the importance of the individual. Martin Heidegger's concepts of anxiety (angst) and mortality drew from Kierkegaard; he is indebted to the way Kierkegaard lays out the importance of our subjective relation to truth, our existence in the face of death, the temporality of existence and the importance of passionately affirming one's being-in-the-world.

Jean-Paul Sartre described the "thing-in-itself" which is infinite and overflowing, and claimed that any attempt to describe or understand the thing-in-itself is "reflective consciousness". Since there is no way for the reflective consciousness to subsume the pre-reflective, Sartre argued that all reflection is fated to a form of anxiety (i.e. the human condition). As well, Sartre argued that when a person tries to gain knowledge of the "Other" (meaning beings or objects that are not the self), their self-consciousness has a "masochistic desire" to be limited. This is expressed metaphorically in the line from the play No Exit, "Hell is other people".

In the theory of psychoanalysis developed around the start of the 20th century, Sigmund Freud did not explicitly address the concept of alienation, but other analysts subsequently have. It is a theory of divisions and conflicts between the conscious and unconscious mind, between different parts of a hypothetical psychic apparatus, and between the self and civilization. It postulates defense mechanisms, including splitting, in both normal and disturbed functioning. The concept of repression has been described as having functionally equivalent effects as the idea of false consciousness associated with Marxist theory.

A form of Western Marxism developed during the century, which included influential analyses of false consciousness by György Lukács. Critics of bureaucracy and the Protestant ethic also drew on the works of Max Weber.

Figures associated with critical theory, in particular with the Frankfurt School, such as Theodor Adorno and Erich Fromm, also developed theories of alienation, drawing on neo-Marxist ideas as well as other influences including neo-Freudian and sociological theories. One approach applies Marxist theories of commodification to the cultural, educational and party-political spheres. Links are drawn between socioeconomic structures, psychological states of alienation, and personal human relationships. In the 1960s the revolutionary group Situationist International came to some prominence, staging 'situations' intended to highlight an alternative way of life to advanced capitalism, the latter conceptualized as a diffuse 'spectacle', a fake reality masking a degradation of human life. The Theory of Communicative Action associated with Jürgen Habermas emphasizes the essential role of language in public life, suggesting that alienation stems from the distortion of reasoned moral debate by the strategic dominance of market forces and state power.

This critical program can be contrasted with traditions that attempt to extract problems of alienation from the broader socioeconomic context, or which at least accept the broader context on its own terms, and which often attribute problems to individual abnormality or failures to adjust.

After the boom in alienation research that characterized the 1950s and 1960s, interest in alienation research subsided, although in sociology it was maintained by the Research Committee on Alienation of the International Sociological Association (ISA).

In the 1990s, there was again an upsurge of interest in alienation prompted by the fall of the Soviet Union, globalization, the information explosion, increasing awareness of ethnic conflicts, and post-modernism. Felix Geyer believes the growing complexity of the contemporary world and post-modernism prompted a reinterpretation of alienation that suits the contemporary living environment. In late 20th and early 21st century sociology, it has been particularly the works of Lauren Langman and Devorah Kalekin-Fishman that address the issue of alienation in the contemporary western world.

== Modalities ==
=== Powerlessness ===
Alienation in the sense of a lack of power has been technically defined by Seeman as "the expectancy or probability held by the individual that his own behaviour cannot determine the occurrence of the outcomes, or reinforcements, he seeks." Seeman argues that this is "the notion of alienation as it originated in the Marxian view of the worker's condition in capitalist society: the worker is alienated to the extent that the prerogative and means of decision are expropriated by the ruling entrepreneurs". More succinctly, Kalekin-Fishman says, "A person suffers from alienation in the form of 'powerlessness' when she is conscious of the gap between what she would like to do and what she feels capable of doing".

In discussing powerlessness, Seeman also incorporated the insights of the psychologist Julian Rotter. Rotter distinguishes between internal control and external locus of control, which means "differences (among persons or situations) in the degree to which success or failure is attributable to external factors (e.g. luck, chance, or powerful others), as against success or failure that is seen as the outcome of one's personal skills or characteristics". Powerlessness, therefore, is the perception that the individual does not have the means to achieve his goals.

Ultimately breaking with the Marxist tradition, Geyer remarks that "a new type of powerlessness has emerged, where the core problem is no longer being unfree but rather being unable to select from among an overchoice of alternatives for action, whose consequences one often cannot even fathom". Geyer adapts cybernetics to alienation theory, and writes that powerlessness is the result of delayed feedback: "The more complex one's environment, the later one is confronted with the latent, and often unintended, consequences of one's actions. Consequently, in view of this causality-obscuring time lag, both the 'rewards' and 'punishments' for one's actions increasingly tend to be viewed as random, often with apathy and alienation as a result".

=== Meaninglessness ===
A sense of meaning has been defined by Seeman as "the individual's sense of understanding events in which one is engaged". Seeman writes that meaninglessness "is characterized by a low expectancy that satisfactory predictions about the future outcomes of behaviour can be made." Whereas powerlessness refers to the sensed ability to control outcomes, this refers to the sensed ability to predict outcomes. In this respect, meaninglessness is closely tied to powerlessness; Seeman argues, "the view that one lives in an intelligible world might be a prerequisite to expectancies for control; and the unintelligibility of complex affairs is presumably conducive to the development of high expectancies for external control (that is, high powerlessness)".

Geyer believes meaninglessness should be reinterpreted for postmodern times: "With the accelerating throughput of information ... meaningless is not a matter anymore of whether one can assign meaning to incoming information, but of whether one can develop adequate new scanning mechanisms to gather the goal-relevant information one needs, as well as more efficient selection procedures to prevent being overburdened by the information one does not need, but is bombarded with on a regular basis." Information overload or the so-called "data tsunami" are well-known information problems confronting contemporary people, and Geyer thus argues that meaninglessness is turned on its head.

=== Normlessness ===
Normlessness (or what Durkheim referred to as anomie) "denotes the situation in which the social norms regulating individual conduct have broken down or are no longer effective as rules for behaviour". This aspect refers to the inability to identify with the dominant values of society or rather, with values that are perceived to be dominant. Seeman adds that this aspect can manifest in a particularly negative manner, "The anomic situation ... may be defined as one in which there is a high expectancy that socially unapproved behaviours are required to achieve given goals".

Neal and Collas write that "[n]ormlessness derives partly from conditions of complexity and conflict in which individuals become unclear about the composition and enforcement of social norms. Sudden and abrupt changes occur in life conditions, and the norms that usually operate may no longer seem adequate as guidelines for conduct". This is a particular issue after the fall of the Soviet Union, mass migrations from developing to developed countries, and the general sense of disillusionment that characterized the 1990s.

=== Relationships ===
One concept used in regard to specific relationships is that of parental alienation, where a separated child expresses a general dislike for one of their parents (who may have divorced or separated). The term is not applied where there is child abuse. The parental alienation might be due to specific influences from either parent or could result from the social dynamics of the family as a whole. It can also be understood in terms of attachment, the social and emotional process of bonding between child and caregiver. Adoptees can feel alienated from both adoptive parents and birth parents.

Familial estrangement between parents and adult children "is attributed to a number of biological, psychological, social, and structural factors affecting the family, including attachment disorders, incompatible values and beliefs, unfulfilled expectations, critical life events and transitions, parental alienation, and ineffective communication patterns." The degree of alienation has been positively correlated with decreased emotional functioning in the parent who feels a loss of identity and stigma.

Attachment relationships in adults can also involve feelings of alienation. Indeed, emotional alienation is said to be a common way of life for many, whether it is experienced as overwhelming, unacknowledged in the midst of a socioeconomic race, or contributes to seemingly unrelated problems.

=== Social isolation ===
Social isolation refers to "The feeling of being segregated from one's community". Neal and Collas emphasize the centrality of social isolation in the modern world: "While social isolation is typically experienced as a form of personal stress, its sources are deeply embedded in the social organization of the modern world. With increased isolation and atomization, much of our daily interactions are with those who are strangers to us and with whom we lack any ongoing social relationships."

Since the fall of the Soviet Union and the end of the Cold War, migrants from Eastern Europe and developing countries have flocked to developed countries in search of a better living standard. This has led to entire communities becoming uprooted: no longer fully part of their homelands, but neither integrated into their adopted communities. Diaspora literature depicts the plights of these migrants, such as Hafid Bouazza in Paravion.

=== Political alienation ===
One manifestation of the above dimensions of alienation can be a feeling of estrangement from the political system and a lack of engagement therein. Such political alienation could result from not identifying with any particular political party or message, and could result in revolution, reforming behavior, or abstention from the political process, possibly due to voter apathy.

A similar concept is policy alienation, where workers experience a state of psychological disconnection from a policy programme being implemented.

=== Self-estrangement ===
Self-estrangement is an elusive concept in sociology, as recognized by Seeman, although he included it as an aspect in his model of alienation. Some, with Marx, consider self-estrangement to be the result and thus the heart of social alienation. Self-estrangement can be defined as "the psychological state of denying one's own interests – of seeking out extrinsically rather than intrinsically satisfying, activities...". It could be characterized as a feeling of having become a stranger to oneself, or to some parts of oneself, or alternatively as a problem of self-knowledge, or authenticity.

Seeman recognized the problems inherent in defining the "self", while post-modernism in particular has questioned the very possibility of pin-pointing what precisely "self" constitutes. Further in that way, if the self is relationally constituted, does it make sense to speak of "self-estrangement" rather than "social isolation"? Costas and Fleming suggest that although the concept of self-estrangement "has not weathered postmodern criticisms of essentialism and economic determinism well", the concept still has value if a Lacanian reading of the self is adopted. This can be seen as part of a wider debate on the concept of self between humanism and antihumanism, structuralism and post-structuralism, or nature and nurture.

=== Mental disturbance ===
Until early in the 20th century, psychological problems were referred to in psychiatry as states of mental alienation, implying that a person had become separated from themselves, their reason or the world. From the 1960s alienation was again considered in regard to clinical states of disturbance, typically using a broad concept of a 'schizoid' ('splitting') process taken from psychoanalytic theory. The splitting was said to occur within regular child development and in everyday life, as well as in more extreme or dysfunctional form in conditions such as schizoid personality and schizophrenia.

Varied concepts of alienation and self-estrangement were used to link internal schizoid states with observable symptoms and with external socioeconomic divisions, without necessarily explaining or evidencing underlying causation. R. D. Laing was particularly influential in arguing that dysfunctional families and socioeconomic oppression caused states of alienation and ontological insecurity in people, which could be considered adaptations but which were diagnosed as disorders by mainstream psychiatry and society. The specific theories associated with Laing and others at that time are not widely accepted, but work from other theoretical perspectives sometimes addresses the same theme.

In a related vein, for Ian Parker, psychology normalizes conditions of social alienation. While it could help groups of individuals emancipate themselves, it serves the role of reproducing existing conditions. This view can be seen as part of a broader tradition sometimes referred to as critical psychology or liberation psychology, which emphasizes that an individual is enmeshed within a social-political framework, and so therefore are psychological problems. Likewise, some psychoanalysts suggest that while psychoanalysis emphasizes environmental causes and reactions, it also attributes the problems of individuals to internal conflicts stemming from early psychosocial development, effectively divorcing them from the wider ongoing context. Slavoj Žižek (drawing on Herbert Marcuse, Michel Foucault, and Jacques Lacan's psychoanalysis) argues that in today's capitalist society, the individual is estranged from their self through the repressive injunction to "enjoy!" Such an injunction does not allow room for the recognition of alienation and, indeed, could itself be seen as an expression of alienation.

More to the political right, however, psychotherapy and associated notions have long been considered anywhere from ineffectual due to their inherent bias against the reality of inborn such as group-specific (genetic) traits to actively destructive much rather than emancipatory. On the other hand, they are not alone in this sentiment either as Marcuse, among others, goes on to speak of repressive desublimation.

=== Disability ===
Differences between persons with disabilities and individuals in relative abilities, or perceived abilities, can be a cause of alienation. One study, "Social Alienation and Peer Identification: A Study of the Social Construction of Deafness", found that among deaf adults one theme emerged consistently across all categories of life experience: social rejection by, and alienation from, the larger hearing community. Only when the respondents described interactions with deaf people did the theme of isolation give way to comments about participation and meaningful interaction. This appeared to be related to specific needs, for example for real conversation, for information, the opportunity to develop close friendships and a sense of family. It was suggested that the social meaning of deafness is established by interaction between deaf and hearing people, sometimes resulting in marginalization of the deaf, which is sometimes challenged. It has also led to the creation of alternatives and the deaf community is described as one such alternative.

Physicians and nurses often deal with people who are temporarily or permanently alienated from communities, which could be a result or a cause of medical conditions and suffering, and it has been suggested that therefore attention should be paid to learning from experiences of the special pain that alienation can bring.

== Criticisms ==
Eric Voegelin with whom also originates the related phrase "to Immanentize the eschaton", may be read as rather accepting of alienation:

The human condition has radical limits, and humans do not feel perfectly comfortable (to say the least). But it is not “ideological” to feel dissatisfaction or to desire something more perfect than what we have. Indeed such feelings as disquiet, anxiety, frustration and even alienation are, according Voegelin, normal. “Man is in deadly anguish,” writes Voegelin, “because he takes life seriously and cannot bear existence without meaning.” For reflection on the limits of the human condition to give rise to ideology, a certain “mood” must be present. What is this mood? It is the mood not only of alienation but of revolt. Ideology involves the active revolt against existential truth and the effort to construct a different world. Voegelin designates this mood as “pneumopathological,” a term he found in Schelling. It is the feeling of “estrangement from the spirit” so intense that it entails a willful closing of the soul to the transcendent.

Philosophers Heidegger, Peter Sloterdijk and more recently Alexander Grau argue for a similar fact of alienation.

== In art and popular culture ==
Alienation is most often represented in literature as the psychological isolation of an individual from society or community. In a volume of Bloom's Literary Themes, Shakespeare's Hamlet is described as the 'supreme literary portrait' of alienation, while noting that some may argue for Achilles in the Iliad. In addition, Bartleby, the Scrivener is introduced as a perfect example because so many senses of alienation are present. Other literary works described as dealing with the theme of alienation are: The Bell Jar, Black Boy, Brave New World, The Catcher in the Rye, The Chosen, Dubliners, Othello, Fahrenheit 451, Invisible Man, Mrs Dalloway, Notes from Underground, One Flew Over the Cuckoo's Nest, The Strange Case of Dr Jekyll and Mr Hyde, The Stranger and The Myth of Sisyphus, The Trial, The Castle, Waiting for Godot, The Waste Land, and Young Goodman Brown. Contemporary British works noted for their perspective on alienation include The Child in Time, London Fields, Trainspotting, and Regeneration.

Sociologist Harry Dahms has analysed The Matrix Trilogy of films in the context of theories of alienation in modern society. He suggests that the central theme of The Matrix is the "all-pervasive yet increasingly invisible prevalence of alienation in the world today, and difficulties that accompany attempts to overcome it".

British progressive rock band Pink Floyd's concept album The Wall (1979) and British alternative rock band Radiohead's album OK Computer (1997), both deal with the subject of alienation in their lyrics.

== See also ==
- Atomism – Sociological theory
- Dehumanization – Behavior or process that undermines individuality of and in others
- Emotional detachment – Inability and/or disinterest in emotionally connecting to others
- Emotional isolation – State of isolation
- Emptiness – Sense of generalized boredom, social alienation and apathy
- Endophobia – Aversion towards one's own ethnic group
- Hermit – Person who lives in seclusion from society
- Marx's theory of alienation – Social theory developed by Karl Marx
- Recluse – Person who lives in voluntary seclusion from the public and society
- Self-estrangement – Concept in Karl Marx's theory of alienation
- Social capital – Networks of relationships among people who live and work in a particular society
- Social comparison theory – Theory in social psychology
- Social exclusion – Form of social disadvantage and relegation to the fringe of society
- Solitude – State of seclusion or isolation of a person
- The Outsider – 1956 book by Colin Wilson
