= Dan Goodley =

English academic

Daniel Goodley, FBA (born 1972) is a scholar in the field of critical disability studies. As of 2024, he is a Professor of Disability Studies and Education in the University of Sheffield's School of Education. He also co-directs the university's iHuman research group, which explores the intersections of the following disciplines: "science and technology studies, sociology of health and illness, critical disability studies, or co-production".

In 2024, he was elected a Fellow of the British Academy (FBA), the United Kingdom's national academy for the humanities and social sciences.

== Books ==
=== As author ===
- Goodley, Dan (2000). Self-advocacy in the Lives of People with Learning Difficulties: The Politics of Resilience. Open University Press. ISBN 978-0-335-20526-4.
- McLaughlin, Janice; Goodley, Dan; Clavering, Emma; Fisher, Pamela (2008). Families Raising Disabled Children. SpringerLink. doi:10.1057/9780230583511. ISBN 978-1-349-36228-8.
- Goodley, Dan (2011). Disability Studies: An Interdisciplinary Introduction. Sage. ISBN 978-1-84787-557-0.
  - Goodley, Dan (2017). Disability Studies: An Interdisciplinary Introduction (2nd ed.). SAGE. ISBN 978-1-4462-8068-3.
  - Goodley, Dan (2025). Disability Studies: An Interdisciplinary Introduction (3rd ed.). Sage Publications Ltd. ISBN 978-1-5296-8228-1.
- Banister, Peter; Bunn, Geoff; Burman, Erica; Daniels, John; Duckett, Paul; Goodley, Dan; Lawthom, Rebecca; Parker, Ian; Runswick-Cole, Katherine; Sixsmith, Judith; Smailes, Sophie; Tindall, Carol; Whelan, Pauline (2011). Qualitative Methods in Psychology: A Research Guide (2nd ed.). McGraw Hill, Open University Press. ISBN 978-0-335-24305-1.
- Goodley, Dan (2014). Dis/ability Studies: Theorising Disablism and Ableism. Routledge. ISBN 978-1-134-06090-0.
- Goodley, Dan (2020). Disability and Other Human Questions. Emerald Publishing Limited. doi:10.1108/9781839827044. ISBN 978-1-83982-707-5.
- Liddiard, Kirsty; Whitney-Mitchell, Sally; Evans, Katy; Watts, Lucy; Spurr, Ruth; Vogelmann, Emma; Runswick-Cole, Katherine; Goodley, Dan (2022). Living Life to the Fullest: Disability, Youth and Voice. Emerald Publishing Limited. doi:10.1108/9781839094446. ISBN 978-1-83909-445-3.
- Michalko, Rod; Goodley, Dan (2023). Letters with Smokie: Blindness and More-than-Human Relations. University of Manitoba Press. ISBN 978-1-77284-036-0.

=== As editor ===
- Goodley, Dan; Moore, Michele, eds. (2002). Disability Arts Against Exclusion: People with Learning Difficulties and Their Performing Arts. BILD. ISBN 978-1-904-08236-1.
- Goodley, Dan; Lawthom, Rebecca; Clough, Peter; Moore, Michele, eds. (2004). Researching Life Stories: Method, Theory, and Analyses in a Biographical Age. RoutledgeFalmer. ISBN 978-0-415-30688-1. OCLC 53021720.
- Goodley, Dan; Lawthom, Rebecca, eds. (2005). Disability and Psychology: Critical Introductions and Reflections. London: Bloomsbury Academic. ISBN 978-1-137-12098-4.
- Goodley, Dan; Van Hove, Geert, eds. (2005). Another Disability Studies Reader? People with Learning Difficulties and a Disabling World. Garant. ISBN 9044114751.
- Hughes, Bill; Goodley, Dan; Davis, Lennard, eds. (2012). Disability and Social Theory: New Developments and Directions. Basingstoke: Palgrave Macmillan. ISBN 978-1-137-02300-1.
- Williams, Antony J.; Billington, Tom; Goodley, Dan; Corcoran, Tim, eds. (2016). Critical Educational Psychology. Newark: Wiley. ISBN 978-1-118-97759-0.
- Chataika, Tsitsi; Goodley, Dan, eds. (2024). The Routledge Handbook of Postcolonial Disability Studies. Routledge, Taylor & Francis Group. ISBN 978-1-003-85471-5.
