= Discursive complex =

The notion of the 'discursive complex' was developed by Ian Parker to tackle the twofold nature of psychoanalysis in Western culture. In his 1997 book Psychoanalytic Culture, Parker defines the 'discursive complex' as a 'methodological device. The term 'complex' is used quite deliberately to evoke the peculiarly Freudian and post-Freudian nature of the subjectivity people in the West live so much of the time. On the one hand the concepts that psychoanalytic texts employ are relayed through culture as components of a discourse, as objects that are circumscribed by definitions in academic and professional writing and used in advertising (Parker, 1995). In this sense, the discourse constitutes places for subjects to come to be, whether as a child with problems separating from the mother, as a teenager filled with frustration and resentment at authority, or as an older adult reflecting on an unfulfilled life and needs. The discourse thus positions the subject who is addressed by or who is employing the discourse to understand themselves or their troubling relationships. On the other hand, the discourse touches an already existing shape of subjectivity for those who write and speak about themselves and others, whether that is in the form of autobiography or in an advice column, in a television interview or on the couch with a therapist. It chimes with a theory of self that the subject has been invited to elaborate for themselves in this culture, and so it reconfigures each time some of the emotions that are available to them.

While psychoanalysis provides a reflection, compression and reduction of societal phenomena to the level of the individual, it does so in a way that also reveals something more of the nature of those phenomena. Parker argues that when we study the way discursive complexes structure cultural phenomena we are also able to understand more of the way they attract and mobilize their subjects. The discursive complex not only exists for the individual subject, then, but it also provides a means for understanding how psychoanalytic language works in relation to specific cultural phenomena. We can then illuminate what is felt to be the 'sharing' of experience by those involved in those phenomena, the rendering of subjects one to another as having similar psychological properties.

In response to critical reviews of this work, and the claim that psychoanalysis is given too much prominence, Parker responds by arguing that the notion of the 'discursive complex' can be extended to study behavioural or cognitive notions conveyed in language and experienced by users. In those cases, Parker suggests that we would then need to speak of 'discursive repertoires' or 'discursive templates'. His main concern, he argues, is with the role of psychoanalysis in relation to psychology, and he adopts the argument made by Erica Burman that psychoanalysis is the 'repressed other' of psychology. In this way he hopes to make psychoanalysis be of relevance to critical psychology without simply replacing psychology with psychoanalysis.
