= Discursive =

Discursive is an adjective from the word discourse and may refer specifically to:

- Discursive complex, a methodological device in psychoanalysis
- Discursive democracy, any system of political decisions based on some tradeoff of consensus decision making and representative democracy
- Discursive meditation, in Christian prayer
- Discursive psychology, a school of psychology
- Discursive reasoning
- Discursive repetition, or Repetition (rhetorical device), the repetition of a certain type of discourse in linguistics
