= Goodley =

Goodley is a surname. Notable people with this surname include:

- Antwan Goodley (born 1991), American football player
- Dan Goodley, English academic
