= Derek Hook =

South African psychologist

- Born: South Africa
- Occupations: Psychologist; psychoanalyst; academic
- Employer(s): Duquesne University; University of Pretoria
- Known for: Lacanian psychoanalysis; critical psychology; postcolonial theory

Academic background
- Thesis: Power in psychodynamic psychotherapy (2001)

Academic work
- Notable works: A Critical Psychology of the Postcolonial; Six Moments in Lacan; Lacan and Race

Derek William Hook (born 1972) is a professor of psychoanalysis at Duquesne University and extraordinary professor of psychology at the University of Pretoria and University of South Africa.

== Life and works ==
=== Publications ===
==== Monographs ====
- Hook, Derek (2007). "Foucault, Psychology and the Analytics of Power". SpringerLink. doi:10.1057/9780230592322. ISBN 978-1-349-28379-8.

==== Editorials ====
- Laubscher, Leswin; Hook, Derek; Desai, Miraj U. (2021-09-10). Fanon, Phenomenology, and Psychology (1 ed.). New York: Routledge. doi:10.4324/9781003037132. ISBN 978-1-003-03713-2.
- Hook, Derek; Vanheule, Stijn (2022-12-05). Lacan on Depression and Melancholia (1 ed.). London: Routledge. doi:10.4324/9781003216391. ISBN 978-1-003-21639-1.
