= Rhetoric of therapy =

Rhetoric of therapy is a concept coined by American academic Dana L. Cloud to describe "a set of political and cultural discourses that have adopted psychotherapy's lexicon—the conservative language of healing, coping, adaptation, and restoration of previously existing order—but in contexts of social and political conflict".

Cloud argued that the rhetoric of therapy encourages people to focus on themselves and their private lives rather than attempt to reform flawed systems of social and political power. This form of persuasion is primarily used by politicians, managers, journalists and entertainers as a way to cope with the crisis of the American Dream. Cloud said "the discursive pattern of translating social and political problems into the language of individual responsibility and healing is a rhetoric because of its powerful persuasive force", and it is rhetoric of "therapy" because "of its focus on the personal life of the individual as locus of both problem and responsibility for change".

== Functions ==
The rhetoric of therapy has two functions, according to Cloud: (1) to exhort conformity with the prevailing social order and (2) to encourage identification with therapeutic values: individualism, familism, self-help, and self-absorption. It is directed towards individuals who cope with unemployment, family stress, sexual and domestic violence, child abuse, and other traumas that result from systemic hegemony such as women's oppression, racism, and capitalism.

== History ==
The origins of therapeutic discourse, along with advertising and other consumerist cultural forms, emerged during the industrialization of the West during the 18th century. The new emphasis on the acquisition of wealth during this period produced discourse about the "democratic self-determination of individuals conceived as autonomous, self-expressive, self-reliant subjects" or, in short, the "self-made man". Cloud argued that the rhetoric of the self-made man was introduced to veil the growing polarity between classes of owners and laborers and that it disguised the fact that success attained through self-determination was never a real possibility for blacks, immigrants, the working class, and women. Therefore, the language of personal responsibility, adaptation, and healing served not to liberate the working class, the poor, and the socially marginalized, but to persuade members of these classes that they are individually responsible for their plight. The rhetoric of therapy served as a diversion away from attention to social ills.

One prominent movement that developed from the rhetoric of therapy was the self-help movement, which encouraged its audiences to take personal responsibility for solving their problems without attention to race, class, and gender issues. The twofold objective of this particular movement—mental health and positive thinking—is demonstrated in one of the quintessential books of this period, The Power of Positive Thinking by Norman Vincent Peale.

Cloud analyzed different case studies to show how the established order is maintained by redirecting blame from the hegemonic system to the individual. Cloud said that the rhetoric of family values blames the absence of the "traditional" family as the cause of social ills. The rhetoric of therapy is used to divert attention from issues caused by hegemonic systems by promoting the idea that restoration of the traditional family structure will result in a harmonious society.

A second example of the rhetoric of therapy is illustrated in Cloud's discussion of the extensive media coverage of groups that supported the Gulf War. Cloud says that the media intentionally devoted significant attention to groups that supported the war in an effort to instill blame, guilt, shame, and anxiety in individuals who openly opposed the war. Cloud writes that this was a government effort to control the nation's perception and response to the war that many deemed unjust. In such cases, the rhetoric of therapy is used to deflate the possibility of collective resistance and to inflate receptivity to prevailing social and political structures.

== See also ==
- Community organizing
- Community psychology
- Critical psychology
- Critical theory
- Liberation psychology
- Psychopolitical validity
- Radical Psychology Network
- Victim mentality
