= Michalko =

Michalko is a surname. Notable people with the surname include:

- Ján Michalko (1947–2024), Slovak cross-country skier
- Rod Michalko, Canadian disability studies scholar
