= Psychopolitical validity =

Psychopolitical validity was coined by Isaac Prilleltensky in 2003 as a way to evaluate community psychology research and interventions and the extent to which they engage with power dynamics, structural level of analysis, and promotion of social justice. The evaluative series of criteria developed by Prilleltensky may be used within any critical social science research and practice model, but can specifically be defined within community psychology research as advocating for a focus on well-being, oppression, and liberation across collective, relational, and personal domains in both research and practice.

An example of research that maintains psychopolitical validity is Bennett's study of Old Order Amish in Canada and their relationship with the state via cultural differences and industrial agriculture policies. Bennett's research investigates power dynamics between the state, mainstream culture, society, and the Amish community. This research looks at oppression and liberation at individual and community levels, and leads to local change as well as change in public policy.

== Overview ==
The construct of psychopolitical validity runs in opposition to "mainstream psychology's traditions [that] reinforce oppressive institutions even when individual psychologists have no such goal in mind,". In addition, this evaluation technique questions mainstream positivism. Psychopolitical validity asks the researcher and activist to think about power and how it affects fundamental epistemological and transformational values.

- What are the political and psychological implications for the researcher and the researched?
- What is the value of a given research question?
- What are the implications of a community intervention developed from said research question?
- How and why is research put into practice?

Prilleltensky describes one component of psychopolitical validity as "the degree to which research and action take into account power dynamics operating in psychological and political domains and in the interaction between them". This inclusion of power and political dynamics is hypothesized to have the ability to move clinical and community psychology beyond helping the afflicted to helping change the systemic, structural sources of inequality that affect the population. Investigation and discussion of psychological and political dynamics may have the "power to promote wellness, resist oppression, and foster liberation".

The interdisciplinary nature of psychopolitical validity lends itself to empowerment studies and social change. Prilleltensky and Fox suggest that psychopolitical validity should be institutionalized as a method of preventing wellness and justice from being discussed in isolation. This type of validity brings the two concepts together and politicizes the concept of wellness promotion.

Definition: "Psychopolitical validity refers to the extent to which studies and interventions in the community integrate (a) knowledge with respect to multidisciplinary and multilevel sources, experiences, and consequences of oppression, and (b) effective strategies for promoting psychological and political liberation in the personal, relational, and collective domains."

== Epistemic and transformative components ==
Psychopolitical validity is divided into two components: epistemic validity and transformational validity.

=== Epistemic validity ===
Epistemic validity uses both psychological and political dynamics when investigating social phenomena. Epistemic validity considers systemic factors and power in development and investigation of research questions and in thinking about the subsequent knowledge produced. When evaluating studies based on epistemic validity there is a focus on whether or not there is an effort to understand and take into account structural forces impacting a given issue. To be valid in this way, it is imperative that there is an understanding of how "global, political, economic forces and social norms influence the perceptions and experiences of individuals and groups".

Definition:
"Epistemic validity is concerned with the degree to which community research and action is attuned to issues of power at multiple levels of analysis (personal, relational, collective). The more systematic the analysis of the phenomenon of interest in terms of psychological and political power, the more valid is the critical research and action."

Prilleltensky and Fox emphasize that epistemic psychopolitical validity measures the extent to which psychology research investigating wellness and justice imagines positive and negative political and psychological dynamics. Positive psychological dynamics can include qualities that vary on an individual level, i.e.: "hope, empathy, optimism, attachment, and social support". Negative forces include, for example, "verbal abuse, stigmatization, or affective distortions". Positive political forces are equitable resource distribution, human rights, maintenance of democracy, and access to civic participation, whereas negative forces include "oppression, exploitation", each of these being dependent on institutionalized power inequalities.

=== Transformational validity ===
Transformational validity measures the extent to which interventions use both politics and psychology to create structural change within society. Studies and interventions with high transformational validity are, for example, ones that promote psychopolitical literacy, educate on overcoming oppression, empower individuals and groups take action against injustice, and advocate for coalition building.

Transformative validity also takes into account how positive and negative political and psychological forces can be changed through action. and refers to many fields, such as education, community intervention, research or clinical psychology.

Definition: "Transformational validity … is concerned with the degree to which community research and action strives to transform social structures. The more transformative and the less ameliorative the intervention, the greater the transformational validity of the critical research and action."

== Critiques ==
Fisher and Sonn (2008) suggest that Prilleltensky fails to take cultural differences and diversity into account. Concepts imperative to any discussion of the importance of psychopolitical validity, such as "wellness", may not be useful across cultures, even across western cultures. They may not be easily conceptualized in cross-cultural context. In addition, they are skeptical of an uncritical rhetoric of democracy, which may fail to recognize other ways of social functioning or the ways democracy could potentially be flawed or misrepresented. Finally, Fisher and Sonn add that a strict and sole adherence to investigation and alleviation of oppression and promotion of liberation might prevent other areas of community psychology from growing.

== See also ==
- Critical psychology
- Liberation psychology
- Radical Psychology Network
- Rhetoric of therapy
