= Tanya Titchkosky =

Disability studies scholar

Tanya Titchkosky (born 1966) is a disability studies scholar. As of January 2025, she is a professor of disability studies at the Ontario Institute for Studies in Education.

Titchkosky earned a Bachelor of Arts in sociology from Augustana University College (1988), a Master of Arts in sociology from York University (1992), and a Doctor of Philosophy from York University (1997).

Titchkosky is dyslexic.

== Books ==
=== Author ===
- Titchkosky, Tanya (2003). Disability, Self, and Society. University of Toronto Press. ISBN 978-0-8020-3561-5. OCLC 50718210.
- Titchkosky, Tanya (2007). Reading and Writing Disability Differently: The Textured Life of Embodiment. University of Toronto Press. ISBN 978-1-442-69155-1.
- Titchkosky, Tanya (2011). The Question of Access: Disability, Space, Meaning. University of Toronto Press. ISBN 978-1-442-66266-7.

=== Editor ===
- Titchkosky, Tanya; Michalko, Rod, eds. (2011). Rethinking Normalcy: A Disability Studies Reader. Canadian Scholars Press. ISBN 978-1-551-30363-5.
- Titchkosky, Tanya; Cagulada, Elaine; DeWelles, Madeleine; Gold, Efrat, eds. (2022). DisAppearing: Encounters in Disability Studies. Canadian Scholars. ISBN 978-1-77338-316-3.
