= Dana L. Cloud =

Academic background
- Education: Pennsylvania State University (BA, BS); University of Iowa (MA, PhD)

Academic work
- Discipline: Communications
- Sub-discipline: Rhetoric; Culture theory; Gender theory; Queer theory
- Institutions: University of Texas in Austin; Syracuse University; University of Cincinnati

Dana L. Cloud is an American communication professor at the University of Cincinnati. Cloud's primary research focuses on rhetoric, culture theory, gender theory, and queer theory. She is best known for her 1998 book Control and Consolation in American Culture and Politics: Rhetoric of Therapy in which she coined the term rhetoric of therapy.

== Early life ==
In 1986, Cloud earned a Bachelor of Arts in English and a Bachelor of Science in telecommunications from Pennsylvania State University. Cloud received her Master of Arts in rhetorical studies from the University of Iowa in 1989. In 1992, she received her Ph.D. in Rhetorical Studies from the department of communication studies at the University of Iowa.

== Career ==
Cloud was a faculty member in the department of communication studies, part of the Center for Women's and Gender Studies and the Department of Rhetoric and Writing at the University of Texas at Austin, Texas, from January 1993 to August 2015. Cloud served as the director of graduate studies in department of communication Studies at the University of Texas at Austin, from 2008 to 2015.

From August 2015 to May 2019, Cloud was a professor and the director of graduate studies at Syracuse University.

Cloud, who was a communications and rhetorical studies professor in the College of Visual and Performing Arts at Syracuse, is a supporter of the Boycott, Divestment and Sanctions (against Israel) movement and describes her views as radical liberalism. She has been named to various "blacklists" of professors during her career. In the Acknowledgements section of Reality Bites she acknowledges her "comrades" in the International Socialist Organization.

== Works ==
Cloud's research interests include critical rhetorical and cultural studies, including Marxist theory, feminist theory, public sphere theory, and postmodernism; the rhetoric of social movements; representations of sex, gender, and race in popular media; activist scholarship; and scholarship about activism.

- 1998: Control and Consolation in American Culture and Politics: Rhetoric of Therapy. SAGE Publications.
- 2011: We are the Union: Democratic Dissent at Boeing. Urbana: University of Illinois Press.
- 2018: Reality Bites: Rhetoric and the Circulation of Truth Claims in U.S. Political Culture. Columbus: Ohio State University Press.
