= Self-estrangement =

Concept in Karl Marx's theory of alienation

Self-estrangement is the idea conceived by Karl Marx in Marx's theory of alienation and Melvin Seeman in his five logically distinct psychological states that encompasses alienation. As spoken by Marx, self-estrangement is "the alienation of man's essence, man's loss of objectivity and his loss of realness as self-discovery, manifestation of his nature, objectification and realization". Self-estrangement is when a person feels alienated from others and society as a whole. A person may feel alienated by his work by not feeling like he has meaning to his work, therefore losing their sense of self at the work place. Self-estrangement contributes to burnout at work and a lot of psychological stress.

== Sociologists on the topic ==
=== Karl Marx ===
In Marx's theory of alienation, he states that self-estrangement is the feeling of being alienated from people and things around oneself. Karl Marx's theory focused more on the self-estrangement aspect in man's work. He further explained it by saying that self-estrangement is the alienation of man from himself and his feelings, man's loss of purpose, the objectification of himself to think that he is not good enough and the realization of that. If someone denies self-estrangement, then they are confirming it as well; by dismissing it, they are acknowledging that it is there. Marx stated that self-estrangement is a significant factor in alienation.

=== Melvin Seeman ===
Melvin Seeman defined the meaning of alienation in his work On the Meaning of Alienation (1959). Seeman states that alienation is identified by five alternative meanings: powerlessness, meaninglessness, normlessness, isolation, and self-estrangement. Self-estrangement in relation to society is essentially being something less than what one might ideally be if the circumstances in society were different, and being insecure and conforming to society's expectations in all aspects of himself. Furthermore, he mentions that alienation is man's loss of pride and satisfaction from doing their work and therefore feeling alienated.

=== Robert K. Merton ===
Robert K. Merton does not directly define self-estrangement in his Theory of Deviancy, but he does touch upon the concept of self-estrangement. In his theory he mentions cultural goals and institutional means. Cultural goals are the ideas and aspirations people reach for and the institutional means are the steps and actions they take to achieve those aspirations. Merton considers ritualism the acceptance of the means but the forfeit of the goals. Ritualists continue to subscribe to the means, but they have rejected the overall goal; this makes them feel alienated from their work causing self-estrangement. They work because they know they have to, not because they have a goal or reason they are doing the work.

=== Arlie Russell Hochschild ===
Arlie Russell Hochschild defined emotional labor and how it can make you feel estranged from yourself. This type of labor requires you to be in a good state of mind and feeling while in the work environment despite any problems you may be going through. At work you are expected to act a certain way and give the best customer service, even if you don't feel the way you act. This can be shown through always having a smile and acting happy while providing service to customers. For example, your boss may tell you to "leave your problems at home", meaning you must act like nothing is wrong even if you feel terrible. Hochschild uses an example of Delta flight attendants and how they must maintain an artificial state of elation throughout their workday despite their exhaustion and may even manage to take that artificial elation outside of their job into their real lives. This makes you feel detached and alienated from your own emotions and cause self-estrangement.

== In a worker ==
Self-estrangement in workers manifests in feelings of working just for a salary, doing one's job just to get it out of the way, or doing work to please others. Although self-estrangement is a small factor, it still contributes to alienation, which contributes strongly to burnout at work. Self-estrangement may provoke different forms of psychic distress that potentially evoke symptoms of burnout, or manifestations of stress that ruin work life. Self-estrangement and lack of meaning in one's work provokes a different form of psychic distress that evokes symptoms of burnout. According to Marx's theory of alienation, a worker can feel self-estranged from their work, their production, and other workers. This means that the person loses interest in why they are working, which can decrease their production and cause them to alienate themselves from other workers as well. The worker doesn't feel like he is a part of the workplace, therefore isolating himself from his work and others.

== In adolescents ==
Self-estrangement appears in many adolescents with low self-esteem. They may feel bored of life and feel like there is no purpose. Without a purpose, these adolescents may feel as if no one around them understands them, and they may alienate themselves. This may cause a decline in performance at school because they feel that they have no purpose in doing homework and a decrease in working on developing friendships because they feel that they don't need them.
