= Radical Psychology Network =

The Radical Psychology Network (RadPsyNet) is an organization with the goal of encouraging reform in the field of psychology. It began in Toronto in 1993 when two dozen people attended a discussion at the American Psychological Association convention entitled "Will Psychology Pay Attention to Its Own Radical Critics?"

== Overview ==
The aim of the group is to change the status quo of psychology. Challenging psychology's traditional focus on minor reform, members emphasise enhancing human welfare by working for fundamental social change. They claim that psychology itself has too often oppressed people rather than liberated them and they work to redress this imbalance. In keeping with this aim, RadPsyNet co-founders Dennis Fox and Isaac Prilleltensky co-edited Critical Psychology: An Introduction in 1997, and many RadPsyNet members are active in academic critical psychology as well as in opposition to psychological abuses.

Today the group has more than 500 members in over three dozen countries. Members include psychologists and others, academics and practitioners, faculty and students, psychotherapists and patients. It publishes the online Radical Psychology Journal (published for ten years until its final issue in 2011) and sponsors an active email discussion list.

== See also ==
- Critical psychology
- Psychopolitical validity, coined by Isaac Prilleltensky in 2003 as a way to evaluate Community Psychology research
