= Liberation psychology =

Approach to psychology

Liberation psychology or liberation social psychology is an approach to psychology that aims to actively understand the psychology of oppressed and impoverished communities by conceptually and practically addressing the oppressive sociopolitical structure in which they exist. The central concepts of liberation psychology include awareness; critical realism; de-ideologized reality; a coherently social orientation; the preferential option for the oppressed majorities, and methodological eclecticism.

Liberation psychology was first conceived by the Spanish and Salvadoran psychologist Ignacio Martín-Baró and developed extensively in Latin America. Liberation psychology is an interdisciplinary approach that draws on liberation philosophy, Marxist, feminist, and decolonial thought, liberation theology, critical theory, critical and popular pedagogy, as well as subareas of critical psychology, particularly critical social psychology.

Through transgressive and reconciliatory approaches, liberation psychology strives to mend the fractures in relationships, experience, and society caused by oppression. Liberation psychology aims to include what or who has become marginalized, both psychologically and socially. The philosophy of liberation psychology stresses the interconnectedness and co-creation of culture, psyche, self, and community. They should be viewed as interconnected and evolving multiplicities of perspectives, performances, and voices in various degrees of dialogue.

== History ==
=== Emergence ===
Core ideas of liberation psychology emerged in Latin America in the 1970s in response to criticisms of traditional psychology, specifically social psychology. Psychology was criticized for its 1) value neutrality; 2) assertion of universality; 3) societal irrelevance.

1. View of science as neutral – The idea that science was devoid of moral elements was considered a flawed framework.
2. Assertion of universality – Psychological theories were being produced based on research conducted primarily with white, middle class, undergraduate males. Liberationists questioned the notion that such principles were universal and therefore applicable to all individuals without regard to the consideration of contextual factors.
3. Societal irrelevance – Psychology was viewed as failing to generate knowledge that could address social inequalities.

In response to these criticisms, psychologists sought to create a psychological science that addressed social inequalities both in theory and practical application. Liberation psychology is not an area of psychology akin to clinical, developmental, or social psychology. It is more of a framework that aims to reconstruct psychology taking into account the perspective of the oppressed (Martín-Baró's "new interlocutor") so the discipline ceases its (often unwitting) complicity with the structures that perpetuate domination, oppression and inequality. Generally, people using this framework would not call themselves "liberation psychologists", although this term is sometimes used to refer to them.

Origins of the term "liberation psychology" (or psicología de la liberación) may have first appeared in print in 1976. It was later brought into widespread use by Ignacio Martín-Baró. A number of other Latin American social psychologists have also developed and promoted the approach, including Martiza Montero (Venezuela), Ignacio Dobles (Costa Rica), Bernardo Jiménez Dominguez (Colombia/Mexico), Jorge Mario Flores (Mexico), Edgar Barrero (Colombia) and Raquel Guzzo (Brazil) among others. A number of similar approaches developed independently in other regions of the World, including South Africa and the Philippines.

=== Founder ===
The genesis of liberation psychology began amongst a body of psychologists in Latin America in the 1970s. Ignacio Martín-Baró is credited as the founder of liberation psychology, and it was further developed by others.

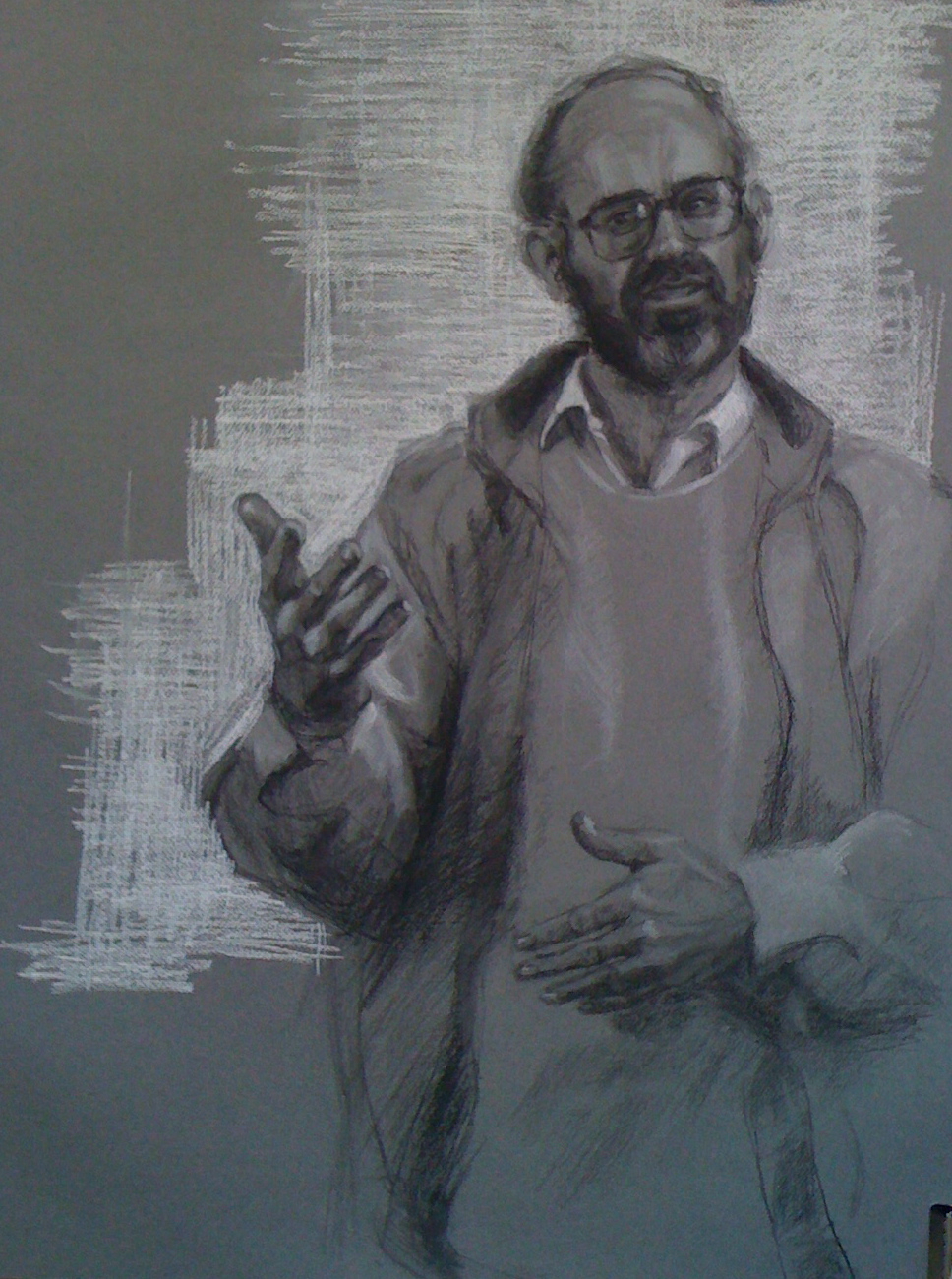
Drawing of Martin-Baro

Martín-Baró was a Spanish-born Jesuit priest and social psychologist who dedicated his work to addressing the needs of oppressed groups in Latin America, and ultimately was assassinated as a result of his work. His project of constructing a psychology relevant to the oppressed majorities of the American continent was therefore terminated prematurely. The collection of some of his articles in the collection Writings for a Liberation Psychology is a seminal text in the field that discusses the role of psychology as socially transformative. Most of his work still remains untranslated into English. His two major textbooks, Social Psychology from Central America, and his other books are published by a small University publisher, UCA editores in El Salvador with the consequence that the breadth and depth of his work is not well known even in Latin America.Martin-Baró conducted research projects with the intention of raising awareness and providing empowerment to oppressed people of El Salvador undergoing social, political, and war-related trauma.

== Key concepts ==
The central concepts of liberation psychology include: awareness; critical realism; de-ideologization; a social orientation; the preferential option for the oppressed majorities, and methodological eclecticism.

=== Awareness ===
The intrinsic connectedness of the person's experience and the sociopolitical structure is a fundamental tenet of liberation psychology and is referred to as concientización, a term introduced by the Brazilian educator Paulo Freire, roughly translatable as the raising of politico-social consciousness. Freire was advocating for developing education and critical awareness among poor citizens. The idea is that in the process of concientización, people become more conscious of themselves and their lives as structured by the social reality of oppression, and learn to think for themselves. This gives them the agency to become social actors. They change as they begin to act on their social circumstances.

Understanding this interconnectedness is of particular importance to understanding the experiences and psychology of oppressed peoples, the power structure to which they are subjugated, and the ways in which this subjugation manifests in their behavior and psychopathology.

=== A social orientation ===
Liberation psychology criticises traditional psychology for explaining human behavior independently of the sociopolitical, historical, and cultural context. Martín-Baró argued that a failure of mainstream psychology is the attribution to the individual of characteristics that are found in the societal relations of the group. He argued that individual characteristics are a result of social relations, and to view such individualistically de-emphasizes the role of social structures, incorrectly attributing sociopolitical problems to the individual. Liberation psychology addresses this by reorienting the focus from an individualistic to a social orientation. Using this framework, the behaviour of oppressed people is conceptualized not through intrapsychic processes, but as a result of the alienating environment.

The social orientation has a particular emphasis on understanding the role of history in shaping current conditions, and the ways in which this history resulted in the oppression of particular communities. Within this orientation, critical examination of social power and its structures is crucial. This is necessary in order to understand political and social power as not being interpersonal, but part of a society's institutional organization.

=== Preferential option for the oppressed majorities ===
The development of a psychology that is "from" oppressed people rather than "for" oppressed people is the aim of liberation psychologists. Traditional psychology is understood as Eurocentric and is critiqued for ignoring the unique experiences of oppressed individuals. Martín-Baró made a similar argument, critiquing Latin American psychologists for adopting Eurocentric psychological models that were not informed by the social, political, and cultural environment of the impoverished and oppressed, which was the majority of people in 1980s El Salvador.

Liberation psychology further criticizes traditional psychology for its ivory tower approach to understanding phenomena, following Martín-Baró's call for psychology to turn its attention from its own social and scientific status to the needs and struggles of the popular majority. Unlike traditional approaches, liberation psychology seeks to re-situate the psychologist as part of the emancipatory process for and with oppressed communities.

=== Critical realism ===
Martín-Baró contended that theories should not define the problems to be explored, but that the problems generate their own theories. This idea is termed critical realism. This is contrasted to the traditional approach of addressing problems based on preconceived theorization, idealismo-metodológico (methodological idealism). In critical realism, theorization plays a supportive, but not fundamental, role. Martín-Baró's idea of realism-crítico should not be equated with the work of Roy Bhaskar on critical realism. Although the two ideas are conceptually similar in some ways, they have distinct meanings (hence the use of the term here in Spanish, rather than attempting a direct translation).

=== De-ideologized reality ===
Martín-Baró emphasized the role of ideology in obscuring the social forces and relations that create and maintain oppression: a key task of psychologists then is to de-ideologize reality, helping people to understand for themselves the nature of social reality transparently rather than obscured by dominant ideology. Ideology, understood as the ideas that perpetuate the interests of hegemonic groups, maintains the unjust sociopolitical environment. Alternatively, a de-ideologized reality encourages members of marginalized populations to endorse ideologies that promote their own interests and not those of the hegemony. Martín-Baró's analysis of supposed Latin American fatalism and the myth of the lazy Latino exemplified his approach as did his use of public opinion surveys to counter the distortion that the then-government and military were presenting of the Salvadorian public's views on the war.

=== Methodological eclecticism ===
Research with a liberation psychology framework incorporates methodologies from diverse domains. Traditional methodologies, such as surveys and quantitative analyses, are combined with more novel techniques for psychology, such as qualitative analyses, photography, drama, and textual analysis.

== Applications ==
=== Community psychology ===
Ignacio Martín-Baró had opposed the introduction of community psychology to El Salvador, on the basis of the ameliorative (asistencialista') approach and limited social perspective of then dominant North American models. Nevertheless, community psychology, and especially the Latin American variants (typically termed community social psychology) is one of the areas most influenced by the concepts of liberation psychology. Moreover, community social psychology in Latin America, which predates liberation psychology, also shares roots in the wider movement of Latin American critical and liberatory praxis (especially dependency theory, philosophy of liberation, liberation theology, critical or popular pedagogy).

=== Psychotherapeutic applications ===
Liberation psychology departs from traditional psychological prioritization of the individual and the attribution of an individual's distress to pathology within the individual. Liberation psychology seeks to understand the person within their sociopolitical, cultural, and historical context. Therefore, distress is understood not solely in intrapsychic terms but in the context of an oppressive environment that psychologizes and individualises distress. In a psychotherapeutic context, this removes the onus of psychological distress solely from the individual and their immediate circumstances, and reframes the origin of distress as the environment and social structure to which persons are subjugated. Furthermore, this helps people to understand their relationship to the power structure, and the ways in which they participate in it. In liberatory approaches to mental distress the therapy is only a step towards the 're-insertion' of a person into their social milieu, social action and their existential life-project.

=== Liberation Music Therapy ===
Liberation Music Therapy (LMT) is an emancipatory approach to music-making that integrates healing, social justice, and revolutionary change. Rooted in the principles of liberation psychology and influenced by the global history of music's role in communal and spiritual practices, LMT challenges traditional, colonialist frameworks of mental health care. It emphasizes addressing systemic oppression and transgenerational trauma through culturally relevant music practices, particularly within marginalized communities. LMT practitioners view music not only as a therapeutic tool but as a form of activism and resistance, fostering solidarity, critical consciousness (concientización), and community empowerment.

This approach combines music's therapeutic qualities with its capacity for social and political transformation, drawing on a variety of influences, including folk traditions, hip-hop, drumming, and chanting, alongside modern and classical genres. Through methods such as lyric analysis, improvisation, and collective musicking, LMT bridges personal emotional experiences with broader societal struggles, engaging individuals and communities in processes of healing and liberation. Practitioners work collaboratively, meeting communities where they are and respecting their cultural genius, with the ultimate aim of fostering both individual well-being and collective resilience.

== Moving liberation psychology forward ==
Since the late 1990s, international congresses on liberation psychology have been held, primarily at Latin American universities. These congresses have been attended by hundreds of professionals and students, and have been crucial in perpetuating the social justice message of liberation psychology.

Specific congress themes include human rights, social justice, democratization, and creating models for liberation psychology in psychological practice and pedagogy. In recent years, these meetings have become increasingly focused on addressing issues related to poverty and economic inequality.

International congresses on liberation psychology include:

- 1st, 1998 in Mexico City, Mexico
- 2nd, 1999 in San Salvador, El Salvador
- 3rd, 2000 in Cuernavaca, Mexico
- 4th, 2001 in Guatemala City, Guatemala
- 5th, 2002 in Guadalajara, Jalisco, Mexico
- 6th, 2003 in Campinas, Brazil
- 7th, 2005 in Liberia, Costa Rica
- 8th, in Santiago de Chile
- 9th, 2008 in Chiapas, Mexico
- 10th, 2010 in Caracas, Venezuela
- 11th, 2012 in Bogotá, Colombia
- 12th, 2014 in Cusco, Peru congress web page
- 13th, 2016 in Cuernavaca, Mexico conference web page

Liberation psychology is not limited to Latin America. The term was used by Philippine psychologist Virgilio Enríquez, apparently independently of Martín-Baró. Elsewhere there have been explicit attempts to apply the approach to practice in other regions. In 2011 an English language liberation psychology network was established by the British psychologist Mark Burton. It has an international membership which reflects interest in liberation psychology from psychologists who do not read Spanish or Portuguese. Moreover, not all liberatory praxis in psychology goes under the name "liberation psychology".

== Examples ==
=== Black psychology ===
Some scholars argue that the liberation psychology framework is central to black psychology. The interconnectedness of the personal and political, a fundamental tenet of liberation psychology, is central to black psychology. Furthermore, black psychology is thought of as inherently liberationist as it argues that addressing the psychology of black persons necessitates understanding, and addressing, the history and sociopolitical power structure that has resulted in the global oppression of individuals of African descent.

Proponents of black psychology operate within the social orientation of liberation psychology, contending that Eurocentric ideologies of traditional psychology lack relevance when dealing with black communities. Therefore, an Afrocentric conceptualization that recognizes the unique history of individuals of African-descent is necessary when dealing with such communities. Using a liberation psychology framework, black psychology argues that simply recognizing the distinctiveness of the black experience is inadequate if the psychological theorization used does not come from the communities to which they are applied. Such a position is consistent with Martín-Baró's assertion that the use of Eurocentric psychological methods is incongruent with the lived experiences of oppressed communities.

=== Liberation psychology and LGBT psychotherapy ===
Recent work in North America has sought to understand the applied use of liberation psychology in psychotherapy with LGBT individuals. Unlike traditional psychotherapeutic interventions, this approach reframes LGBT individuals' psychological issues as resulting from an understandable incorporation of the homonegative attitudes characteristic of the social structures within which gay and transgender people live.

Traditional psychotherapy typically recognises the effect of homophobia and its impact on LGBT people, but often fails to clear the person of the blame for embracing such views. However, a liberationist psychological approach aims to facilitate the freeing the individual of the blame for adopting the homonegative views of the society. Instead, the onus is on the social environment, understanding that persons are themselves constituted as persons in their social context. Such an approach understands 'psychological' issues as inextricably linked to the societal context.

This may free the LGBT person from feeling flawed for harboring homonegative ideas. They are then able to examine how they are a participant in the social environment and the ways in which they can take responsibility for future actions. Additionally, using the concept of concientización, people can examine how changing themselves can challenge the oppressive nature of the larger sociopolitical system, although in most liberation psychology there is a more dialectical relationship between personal and social change where personal change does not have to precede social liberation.

=== Ethnopolitical Psychology ===
Moreover, the framework of radical healing is closely aligned with ethnopolitical psychology, a form of liberation psychology.The aim of ethnic political psychology is to encourage healing and transformation through the development of critical consciousness and political activism, especially in regards to decolonizing people of color, reformulating their ethnic identity, and promoting racial reconciliation, personal growth, and societal change. Cultural imperialism, racism, oppression, and colonization can all result in trauma, which is believed by liberation psychologists to be able to be healed by ethno-political psychology, though no comprehensive studies exist. This process integrates diverse identities, gives people a sense of mastery, and reconnects them to their roots. By combining Eastern and Western healing traditions with Indigenous healing, this model provides a culturally appropriate framework. POCI must be accompanied by practitioners who bear witness to their suffering and are committed to helping them recognize systemic racial oppression and colonialism, while embracing resistance instead of maintaining the status quo.

== See also ==
- Critical psychology
- Community psychology
- Psychopolitical validity
- Rhetoric of therapy
