= Ian Parker (psychologist) =

British psychologist and psychoanalyst

- Born: Ian Andrew Parker; 1956 (age 69–70); United Kingdom
- Scientific career
- Fields: Critical psychology Theoretical psychology Discourse analysis Deconstruction; Psychoanalytic social theory Marxist psychology Qualitative psychology
- Workplaces: University of Leicester

Ian Parker (born 1956) is a British psychologist and psychoanalyst. He is Emeritus Professor of Management in the School of Business at the University of Leicester.

== Biography ==
Parker went to Ravens Wood School in Keston, Bromley, UK, studied psychology at Plymouth Polytechnic and the University of Southampton, lectured at Manchester Polytechnic from 1985, was appointed Professor of Psychology at Bolton Institute in 1996, and returned to Manchester as Professor of Psychology at Manchester Metropolitan University in 2000. In 2012 he was suspended for questioning, in his capacity as departmental union representative for the University and College Union, work-load and appointment procedures. There was an international campaign for his reinstatement, and an online petition which claimed 'victory' with 3772 signatures. In 2013 he resigned his post, and moved to the University of Leicester, and also took up visiting professorial positions at Ghent University, Belgium, Universidade de Sao Paulo, Brasil, University of the Witwatersrand, South Africa, Universidad Complutense de Madrid, Spain, Birkbeck University of London, UK, University of Roehampton, UK and University of Manchester, UK.

He is an analyst member of the Centre for Freudian Analysis and Research, and Honorary Secretary of the College of Psychoanalysts-UK.

== Thought ==
Parker has worked in three traditions of critical psychology: discursive analysis, Marxist psychology, and psychoanalysis, with a focus on questions of ideology and power.

=== Discursive analysis ===
Discursive analysis appears in his earliest writing, which is focused on the 'crisis' in laboratory-experimental social psychology during the 1960s through to the 1980s. In his first book, The Crisis in Modern Social Psychology, and How to End It (1989), Parker uses structuralist and post-structuralist theories to disrupt the claims that psychologists make to speak a professional expert 'truth' about human psychology. Toward the end of the book he moves beyond the 'turn to language' in social psychology to a 'turn to discourse', and this, he argues, will enable critical researchers to treat psychology itself as a set of discourses or stories about people rather than as things that are universally true. Analyses of 'psychologisation' are then necessary to critical discursive work.

This argument is taken forward in Discourse Dynamics: Critical Analysis for Social and Individual Psychology (1992), but now there is a discussion of the relationship between discourse and reality, and at this point Parker seems to think that ‘critical realism' might be helpful to avoid problems with 'relativism' in the social sciences. He returns to these issues ten years later in Critical Discursive Psychology (2002), but by this time he is pessimistic about the critical potential of a purely discursive approach. He prefers the term 'discursive practice'. His book on methodology, Qualitative Psychology: Introducing Radical Research (2005) includes a new version of discourse analysis that attempts to break down the divisions between the researcher and those they study.

Critical responses and commentaries on the impact of Ian Parker’s work on discourse analysis have often focused on what is seen as a reification of ‘discourse’: his conceptual work on discourse has been criticised on this basis from a traditional social psychological position (e.g., Abrams and Hogg, 1990) and from a 'discursive' position (e.g., Potter et al., 1990; Potter & Edwards, 1999). Critical commentaries on his work on discourse analysis were included in his book Critical Discursive Psychology in 2002, and in the second edition of that book in 2015.

=== Marxist psychology ===
Parker employed Marxist arguments in his first book, and that book on the 'crisis' ends with a discussion of 'transitional demands' that borrow from Trotskyist politics (and these demands are designed to start from what it is reasonable to ask for but in such a way as to lead to a questioning of oppression). A co-edited book, Psychology and Society: Contradiction and Coexistence (1996) is explicitly concerned with Marxist approaches to psychology, and a note indicates that the original title was to be Psychology and Marxism. All the contributors to this book are Marxists, but using a variety of different psychological theories (and Parker’s chapter is on Trotsky and psychoanalysis).

Discussion of Marxist psychology is scattered throughout Parker’s work, and he defines himself as a Marxist, and supporter of the Fourth International. There is a reflection on this in the opening chapter by him of Critical Discursive Psychology, and Marxist ideas are outlined (alongside psychoanalysis, post-structuralism and feminism) in a paper 'Discursive resources in the Discourse Unit' written for the Discourse Unit, a research group which he founded with Erica Burman. Recent interviews indicate that feminist arguments have become more important to Parker, and that Marxism itself may not provide a complete true theory (or alternative to psychology). The discipline of psychology is now treated as an ongoing process of 'psychologisation' operating within institutions suffused with the power to define and manage individual behaviour and experience. This argument is outlined in the book Revolution in Psychology (2007).

Marxist responses to Ian Parker's work have come from Vygotskian developmental psychologists using his work in the political domain (e.g., Holzman, 1995; Newman and Holzman, 2000), and from mainstream experimental psychologists (e.g., Jost and Hardin, 1996).

=== Psychoanalytic theory ===
Psychoanalysis is discussed at length in Psychoanalytic Culture: Psychoanalytic Discourse in Western Society (1997), and traditions of theory from British, German and French psychoanalysis are examined critically. These ideas are complemented in the book by original empirical research. The book is a curious mixture of explication and analysis; Parker oscillates between a description of a psychoanalytic theory and a critical account of how it has come to seem to be true to people in Western culture. The most important conceptual contribution by him in the book is that of the 'discursive complex' to explicate how psychoanalysis operates as a social construction and in lived experience. He trained as a Lacanian psychoanalyst with the Centre for Freudian Analysis and Research in London toward the end of the 1990s, and has written on psychoanalytic social theory, in his book Slavoj Žižek: A Critical Introduction (2004).

Parker’s discussion of psychoanalysis sometimes appears to be situated within a discursive or Marxist theoretical framework, but he then seems to use psychoanalytic theory as a framework to understand pathology in contemporary society. The original research in his 1997 book Psychoanalytic CultureHand 2009 book Psychoanalytic Mythologies is critical also of psychoanalysis itself. His argument is that psychoanalysis and a form of 'psychoanalytic subjectivity' has developed under capitalism, and so it is necessary to take it seriously to change society and enable individuals to change. It is not clear how this use of psychoanalysis fits with his radical work on mental health, which is contained in his co-authored book Deconstructing Psychopathology (1995), which draws on action research described by him in that book, and in his edited book Deconstructing Psychotherapy (1999). (Those books draw heavily on the works of the postmodern philosophers Michel Foucault and Jacques Derrida rather than the psychoanalyst Jacques Lacan.) Parker was author of Lacanian Psychoanalysis: Revolutions in Subjectivity in 2011, and co-editor (with David Pavon-Cuellar) of Lacan, Discourse, Event: New Psychoanalytic Approaches to Textual Indeterminacy in 2014, a book which connects psychoanalysis with discourse analysis. He edits the 'Lines of the Symbolic in Psychoanalysis' series as Secretary of Manchester Psychoanalytic Matrix for Routledge.

== Publications ==
Parker is author or co-author of 25 books, and editor or co-editor of 15 books. His books and articles have been published in 17 languages. Parker edited a four-volume 'major work' Critical Psychology for Routledge in 2011, and a Handbook of Critical Psychology in 2015. A collection of published and previously unpublished work appeared in six books published by Routledge in the series 'Psychology After Critique'. He edits the 'Concepts for Critical Psychology' series for Routledge, and is managing editor of the Annual Review of Critical Psychology. Psychoanalysis and Revolution: Critical Psychology for Liberation Movements, co-authored with David Pavón-Cuéllar was first published in Russian, and then in Italian and English in 2021, and then in Spanish, Bahasa Indonesian and Portuguese in 2022.

=== Books ===
- Parker, I. (1989) The Crisis in Modern Social Psychology, and how to end it, London and New York: Routledge. ISBN 0-415-01494-8
- Parker, I. (1992) Discourse Dynamics: Critical Analysis for Social and Individual Psychology, London and New York: Routledge. ISBN 0-415-05018-9
- Banister, P., Burman, E., Parker, I., Taylor, M. and Tindall, C. (1994) Qualitative Methods in Psychology: A Research Guide, Milton Keynes: Open University Press. ISBN 0335191819
- Foster, J. J. and Parker, I. (1995) Carrying Out Investigations in Psychology, Leicester: British Psychological Society. ISBN 1-85433-170-1
- Parker, I., Georgaca, E., Harper, D., McLaughlin, T. and Stowell Smith, M. (1995) Deconstructing Psychopathology, London: Sage. ISBN 0-8039-7481-7
- Parker, I. (1997) Psychoanalytic Culture: Psychoanalytic Discourse in Western Society, London: Sage. ISBN 0-7619-5643-3
- Parker, I. and the Bolton Discourse Network (1999) Critical Textwork: An Introduction to Varieties of Discourse and Analysis, Buckingham: Open University Press. ISBN 0-335-20204-7
- Parker, I. (Ed.) (1999). Deconstructing psychotherapy. London: Sage.
- Parker, I. (2002) Critical Discursive Psychology. London: Palgrave. ISBN 033397381X
- Parker, I. (2005) Qualitative Psychology: Introducing Radical Research. Buckingham: Open University Press. ISBN 0335213499
- Parker, I. (2007) Revolution in Psychology: Alienation to Emancipation. London: Pluto Press. ISBN 978-0-7453-2535-4
- Parker, I. (2008) Japan in Analysis: Cultures of the Unconscious. London: Palgrave. ISBN 978-0230506916
- Parker, I. (2009) Psychoanalytic Mythologies. London: Anthem Press. ISBN 978-1843313038
- Parker, I. (2014) The Crisis in Modern Social Psychology, and how to end it. Abingdon/New York: Routledge [Psychology Revivals, original published 1989]. ISBN 978-0-415-70645-2
- Parker, I. (2014) Discourse Dynamics: Critical Analysis for Social and Individual Psychology. Abingdon/New York: Routledge [Psychology Revivals, original published 1992]. ISBN 978-0-415-70638-4
- Parker, I. (2014) Revolução na Psicologia: da alienação à emancipação. Campinas, Brazil, Alínea. ISBN 978-85-7516-714-4
- Parker, I. and Pavón-Cuéllar, D. (comps) (2014) Lacan, Discurso, Acontecimeinto: Nuevo Análisis de la Indeterminación Textual. Mexico DF: Plaza y Valdes. ISBN 978-607-402-597-2
- Parker, I. and Pavón-Cuéllar, D. (eds) (2014) Lacan, Discourse, Event: New Psychoanalytic Approaches to Textual Indeterminacy. Abingdon/New York: Routledge. ISBN 978-0-415-52163-5
- Parker, I. (2015) Handbook of Critical Psychology. London and New York: Routledge. ISBN 978-1-84872-218-7
- Parker, I. (2015) Critical Discursive Psychology (2nd Edition). London: Palgrave Macmillan. ISBN 9781137485595
- Parker, I. (2015) Psychology After the Crisis: Scientific paradigms and political debate. Abingdon/New York: Routledge. ISBN 978-1-84872-207-1
- Parker, I. (2015) Psychology After Deconstruction: Erasure and Social Reconstruction. Abingdon/New York: Routledge. ISBN 978-1-84872-209-5
- Parker, I. (2015) Psychology After Discourse Analysis: Concepts, methods, critique. Abingdon/New York: Routledge. ISBN 978-1-84872-211-8
- Parker, I. (2015) Psychology After Psychoanalysis: Psychosocial studies and beyond. Abingdon/New York: Routledge. ISBN 978-1-84872-213-2
- Parker, I. (2015) Psychology After the Unconscious: From Freud to Lacan. Abingdon/New York: Routledge. ISBN 978-1-84872-215-6
- Parker, I. (2015) Psychology After Lacan: Connecting the clinic and research. Abingdon/New York: Routledge. ISBN 978-1-84872-217-0
- Parker, I. (2017) Revolutionary Keywords for a New Left. Washington/Winchester. Zero Books. ISBN 978-1-785356421
- Parker, I. and Pavón-Cuéllar, D. (eds) (2017) Marxismo, psicología y psicoanálisis. Morelia, Mexico: Paradiso editors, Universidad Michoacana de San Nicolás de Hidalgo. ISBN 978-6-079787103
- Parker, I. (2018) Psy-Complex in Question: Critical Review in Psychology, Psychoanalysis and Social Theory. Washington/Winchester. Zero Books. ISBN 978-1-785357497
- Parker, I. (2019) Psychoanalysis, Clinic and Context: Subjectivity, History and Autobiography. Abingdon/New York: Routledge. ISBN 978-0-367144333
- Parker, I. (2020) Psychology through Critical Auto-Ethnography: Academic Discipline, Professional Practice and Reflexive History. Abingdon/New York: Routledge. ISBN 978-0-367344177
- Parker, I. (2020) Socialisms: Revolutions Betrayed, Mislaid and Unmade. London: Resistance Books. ISBN 978-0-902869-71-4
- Parker, I. (2020) Mapping the English Left Through Film: Twenty-Five Uneasy Pieces. London: Folrose. ISBN 978-0-906378-09-0
- Parker, I. and Pavón-Cuéllar, D. (2021) Psychoanalysis and Revolution: Critical Psychology for Liberation Movements. London: 1968 Press. ISBN 9781919601908
- Parker, I. (2022) Radical Psychoanalysis and Anti-Capitalist Action. London: Resistance Books. ISBN 978-0-902869-29-5
- Parker, I. (2022) Stalinist Realism and Open Communism: Malignant Mirror or Free Association. London: Resistance Books. ISBN 978-0-902869-27-1
