= Rod Michalko =

Disability studies scholar

Rod Michalko is a Canadian scholar in the field of disability studies.

Michalko earned his Doctor of Philosophy in sociology from the University of British Columbia. In 2007, he worked at New College, Toronto, where he designed a series of disability studies courses. He has since retired from the University of Toronto.

Michalko began losing his vision as a child and is now blind. Until 2001, Michalko was aided by his guide dog, Smokie, which he has written about in The Two-in-One (1999) and Letters with Smokie (2023). Since Smokie's death, Michalko has used a white cane.

Michalko is the partner of fellow academic Tanya Titchkosky.

Michalko passed on August 14, 2026.

== Books ==
=== Author ===
- Michalko, Rod (1998). The Mystery of the Eye and the Shadow of Blindness. Toronto, Ontario: University of Toronto Press. ISBN 978-0-8020-8093-6.
- Michalko, Rod (1999). The Two-in-One: Walking with Smokie, Walking with Blindness. Philadelphia, Pennsylvania: Temple University Press. ISBN 978-1-56639-649-3.
- Michalko, Rod (2002). The Difference that Disability Makes. Philadelphia, Pennsylvania: Temple University Press. ISBN 978-1-56639-933-3.
- Michalko, Rod (2017). Things are Different Here: And Other Stories. London, Ontario: Insomniac Press. ISBN 978-1-55483-188-3. OCLC 961802486.
- Michalko, Rod; Goodley, Dan (2023). Letters with Smokie: Blindness and More-than-Human Relations. Winnipeg, Manitoba: University of Manitoba Press. ISBN 978-1-77284-033-9.

=== Editor ===
- Titchkosky, Tanya; Michalko, Rod, eds. (2009). Rethinking Normalcy: A Disability Studies Reader. Toronto, Ontario: Canadian Scholars' Press. ISBN 978-1-55130-363-5.
