= Erica Burman =

British psychologist (born 1960)

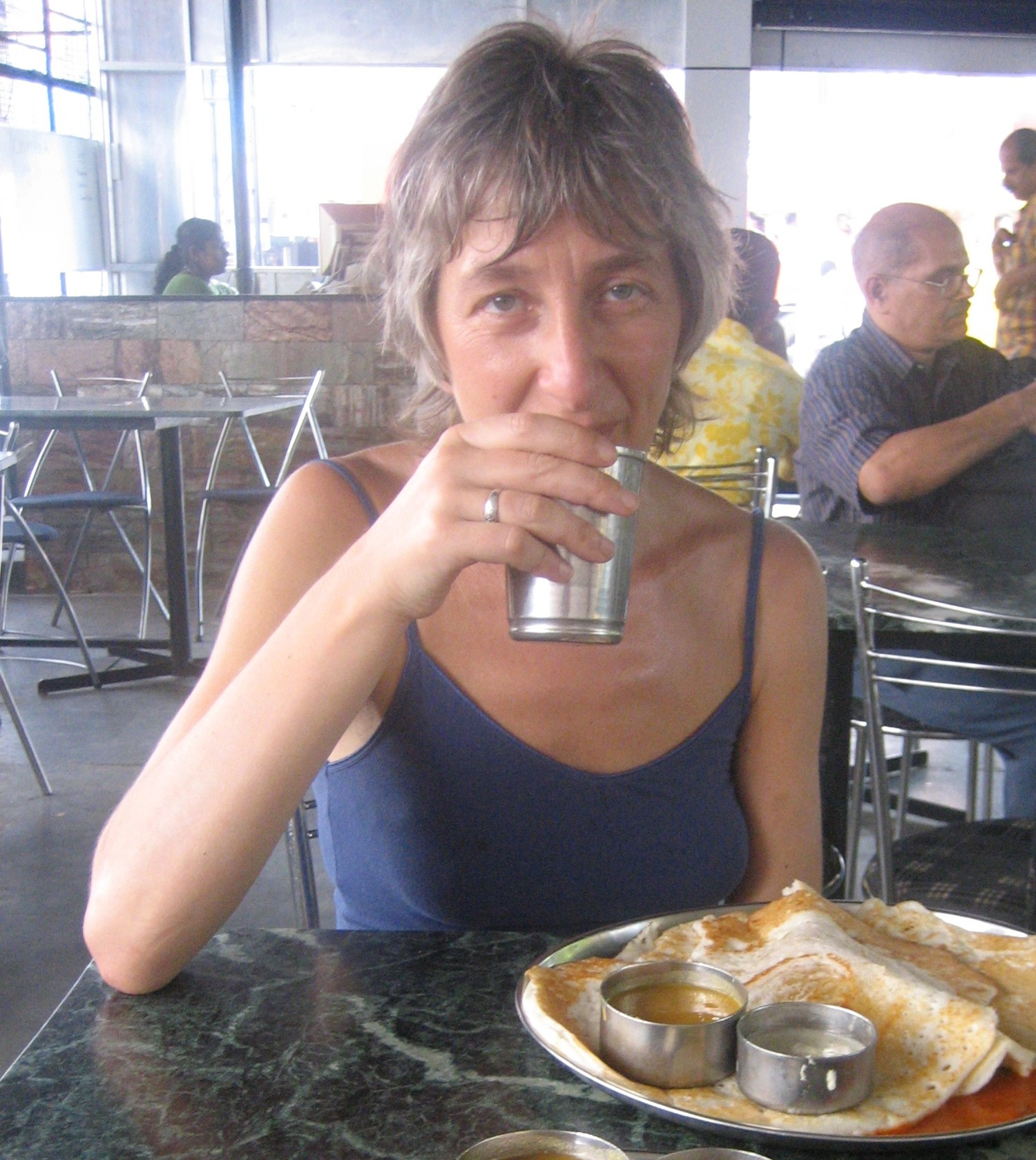
Erica Burman

Erica Burman (born 1960) is a critical development psychologist based in the United Kingdom. While little known in the developmental psychology research community, her work has been a conceptual resource for critiques of the field, notably feminist perspectives on the connections between different forms of oppression, and methodological debates in psychology.

== Developmental psychology ==
Burman’s 1994 work, Deconstructing Developmental Psychology, provided a critical response to mainstream theories of child development, and drew upon feminist theory to show how this aspect of psychology serves to regulate family behavior, marginalize working class and minority ethnic women and pathologise their experience as mothers. The book covers the spectrum of dominant approaches in psychology, and finds each of them wanting. The specific cultural assumptions that give rise to different forms of psychology are examined, and the book provides new ways of thinking about the position of children in modern society.

Following this book much of Burman’s research has been devoted to representations of children, and to the connections between different kinds of "development". She has continued critical examination of the role of developmental psychology, and her work turned to study the way images of children are used in connection with the "developing" world. She has also focused her research on the question of how such images of women and children hold in place models of the "progress" of the development of the nation state.

== Feminist research and methodology ==
Although feminist research has been a central concern of Burman’s writing on developmental psychology, she has questioned cultural assumptions in "second wave" feminism, and she has often drawn on anti-racist debates. She has drawn attention to the way the position of women is closely connected with the position of cultural minorities. Burman is best known as a developmental psychologist and theorist of women’s studies, but many of her publications have been concerned with radical developments in methodology (see, for example, her analysis of the way debates on child labor can be used to show the limits of mainstream models in developmental psychology in the 2006 FQS online reference). Her study of different ways of carrying out research has been a powerful resource for feminist psychologists, but beyond that the impact has been felt in "discourse analysis" and in "critical psychology" (see for example the 2004 DAOL online reference) and in critical mental health.

She is sometimes criticized for being too political because her work crosses academic disciplinary boundaries. She is less an exponent of how psychology can help people than a critic of psychology, and so her work is dismissed as irrelevant by some mainstream developmental psychologists.

Erica Burman also trained as a group analyst, and much of her work has been in collaboration with a new generation of researchers working in psychology and in adjoining disciplines, and with practitioners. Apart from edited books, Burman has produced a number of collaborative books on the position of women (in 1995, Challenging Women: Psychology's Exclusions, Feminist Possibilities) and discursive research (in 1996, Psychology Discourse Practice: From Regulation to Resistance). This collaborative research and writing has continued in recent years in publications on suicide and self-harm and on domestic violence and "minoritisation", in which her concerns with the position of women and children connect with asylum and immigration issues. Burman was a co-founder (with Ian Parker) of the Discourse Unit at Manchester Metropolitan University, and the website of this research unit provides open access to a number of publications.

Critical responses to Erica Burman’s work have been in the fields of policy and ethics around work with children in the UK (e.g., Dahlberg et al., 2005; Mac Naughton, 2005). Her work has been acclaimed and used in teaching of alternative approaches to developmental psychology in New Zealand (e.g., Bird and Drewery, 2000) and South Africa (e.g., Hook et al., 2002).

== Books by Erica Burman ==
- Burman, E. (ed.) (1990). Feminists and Psychological Practice. London: Sage. (Out of print, available at discourseunit.com)
- Burman, E. and Parker, I. (eds) (1993). Discourse Analytic Research: Repertoires and Readings of Texts in Action. London and New York: Routledge. (Out of print, available at discourseunit.com)
- Burman, E. (1994). Deconstructing Developmental Psychology. London and New York: Routledge.
- Banister, P., Burman, E., Parker, I., Taylor, M. and Tindall, C. (1994). Qualitative Methods in Psychology: A Research Guide. Milton Keynes: Open University Press.
- Burman, E., Alldred, P., Bewley, C., Goldberg, B., Heenan, C., Marks, D., Marshall, J.. Taylor, K., Ullah, R. and Warner. S. (1995). Challenging Women: Psychology's Exclusions, Feminist Possibilities. Buckingham: Open University Press.
- Burman, E. Aitken, G., Alldred, A., Allwood, R., Billington, T., Goldberg, B., Gordo Lopez, A., Heenan, C.. Marks, D. and Warner, S. (1996). Psychology Discourse Practice: From Regulation to Resistance. London: Taylor & Francis.
- Levett, A., Kottler, A., Burman, E. and Parker, I. (eds) (1997). Culture, Power and Difference: Discourse Analysis in South Africa. London: Zed Books / Cape Town: UCT Press.
- Burman, E. (ed.) (1998). Deconstructing Feminist Psychology. London: Sage.
- Burman, E. (1998). La Decontruccion de la Psicologia Evolutiva. Madrid: Visor Apredizaje.
- Chantler, K., Burman, E., Batsleer, J. and Bashir, C. (2001). Attempted Suicide and Self Harm – South Asian Women. Manchester: Women’s Studies Research Centre, MMU.
- Batsleer, J., Burman. E., Chantler, K., Pantling, K., Smailes, S., McIntosh, S. and Warner, S. (2002). Domestic Violence and Minoritisation: supporting women towards independence. Women’s Studies Research Centre, MMU.
- Banister, P., Burman, E., Parker, I., Taylor, M. and Tindall, C. (2004). Métodos Cualitativos en Psicología: Una Guía Para la Investigación. Guadalajara: Universidad de Guadalajara.
- Hook, D. (ed.) (2004), with Mkhize, N. Kiguwa, P. and Collins, A. (section eds) and Burman, E. and Parker, I. (consulting eds) (2004). Critical Psychology. Cape Town: UCT Press.
- Burman, E. (2018). Fanon, Education, Action: Child as Method. London: Routledge.

== Critical responses ==
- Bird, L. and Drewery, W. (2000). Human Development in Aotearoa: A Journey Through Life. Auckland: McGraw Hill.
- Dahlberg, G., Moss, P., and Pence, A. (2005). Beyond Quality in Early Childhood Education and Care. London: RoutledgeFalmer.
- Hook, D., Watts, J. and Cockcraft, K. (eds) (2002). Developmental Psychology. Cape Town: University of Cape Town Press.
- Mac Naughton, G. (2005). "Doing Foucault" in Early Childhood Studies. London: Routledge.
