= Critical psychology =

Perspective on psychology

Critical psychology is a perspective on psychology that draws extensively on critical theory. Critical psychology challenges the assumptions, theories and methods of mainstream psychology and attempts to apply psychological understandings in different ways.

The field of critical psychology does not fall under a monolithic category. One can observe different starting points of critiques, similarities, as well as substantial differences. Thus, critical psychology should be perceived as an “umbrella term” that includes various critiques against the status quo of mainstream psychology. A common theme of critical approaches in psychology is the assessment of the social effects of psychological theories and practices. Critical psychology is a movement that challenges psychology to work towards emancipation and social justice, and that opposes the uses of psychology to perpetuate oppression and injustice.

Critical psychologists believe that mainstream psychology fails to consider how power differences and discrimination between social classes and groups can impact an individual's or a group's mental and physical well-being. Mainstream psychology does this only in part by attempting to explain behavior at the individual level. However, it largely ignores institutional racism, postcolonialism and deficits in social justice for minority groups based on differences in observable characteristics such as gender, ethnicity, religious minority, sexual orientation, or disability.

== Origins ==
Psychology, draws a history filled with theoretical and political conflict. Within its history various stream of critiques have emerged, some of them sharing similarities, as well as different starting points and substantial differences. Criticisms of mainstream psychology consistent with current critical psychology usage have existed since psychology's modern development in the late 19th century. Use of the term critical psychology started in the 1970s at the Freie Universität Berlin. The German branch of critical psychology predates and has developed largely separately from the rest of the field. As of May 2007, only a few works have been translated into English. The German Critical Psychology movement is rooted in the post-war student revolt of the late 1960s; see German student movement. Marx's Critique of Political Economy played an important role in the German branch of the student revolt, which was centered in West Berlin. At that time, the capitalist city of West Berlin was surrounded by communist-ruled East Germany, and represented a "hot spot" of political and ideological controversy for the revolutionary German students. The sociological foundations of critical psychology are decidedly Marxist.

=== Klaus Holzkamp ===
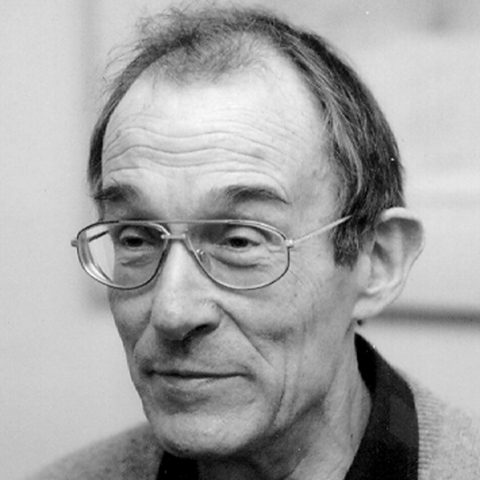
Klaus Holzkamp

One of the most important and sophisticated books in the German development of the field is the Grundlegung der Psychologie (Foundations of Psychology) by Klaus Holzkamp, who might be considered the theoretical founder of German critical psychology. Holzkamp wrote two books on theory of science and one on sensory perception before publishing the Grundlegung der Psychologie in 1983. Holzkamp believed his work provided a solid paradigm for psychological research because he viewed psychology as a pre-paradigmatic scientific discipline (T.S. Kuhn had used the term "pre-paradigmatic" for social science).

Holzkamp mostly based his sophisticated attempt to provide a comprehensive and integrated set of categories defining the field of psychological research on Aleksey Leontyev's approach to cultural–historical psychology and activity theory. Leontyev had seen human action as a result of biological as well as cultural evolution and, drawing on Marx's materialist conception of culture, stressed that individual cognition is always part of social action which in turn is mediated by man-made tools (cultural artifacts), language and other man-made systems of symbols, which he viewed as a major distinguishing feature of human culture and, thus, human cognition. Another important source was Lucien Séve's theory of personality, which provided the concept of "social activity matrices" as mediating structure between individual and social reproduction. At the same time, the Grundlegung systematically integrated previous specialized work done at Free University of Berlin in the 1970s by critical psychologists who also had been influenced by Marx, Leontyev, and Seve. This included books on animal behavior/ethology, sensory perception, motivation and cognition. He also incorporated ideas from Freud's psychoanalysis and Merleau-Ponty's phenomenology into his approach.

One core result of Holzkamp's historical and comparative analysis of human reproductive action, perception and cognition is a very specific concept of meaning that identifies symbolic meaning as historically and culturally constructed, purposeful conceptual structures that humans create in close relationship to material culture and within the context of historically specific formations of social reproduction.

Coming from this phenomenological perspective on culturally mediated and socially situated action, Holzkamp launched a methodological attack on behaviorism (which he termed S–R (stimulus–response) psychology) based on linguistic analysis, showing in minute detail the rhetorical patterns by which this approach to psychology creates the illusion of "scientific objectivity" while at the same time losing relevance for understanding culturally situated, intentional human actions. Against this approach, he developed his own approach to generalization and objectivity, drawing on ideas from Kurt Lewin in Chapter 9 of Grundlegung der Psychologie.

His last major publication before his death in 1995 was about learning. It appeared in 1993 and contained a phenomenological theory of learning from the standpoint of the subject. One important concept Holzkamp developed was "reinterpretation" of theories developed by conventional psychology. This meant to look at these concepts from the standpoint of the paradigm of critical psychology, thereby integrating their useful insights into critical psychology while at the same time identifying and criticizing their limiting implications, which in the case of S–R psychology were the rhetorical elimination of the subject and intentional action, and in the case of cognitive psychology which did take into account subjective motives and intentional actions, methodological individualism.

The first part of the book thus contains an extensive look at the history of psychological theories of learning and a minute re-interpretation of those concepts from the perspective of critical psychology, which focuses on intentional action situated in specific socio-historical/cultural contexts. The conceptions of learning he found most useful in his own detailed analysis of "classroom learning" came from cognitive anthropologists Jean Lave (situated learning) and Edwin Hutchins (distributed cognition).

The book's second part contained an extensive analysis on the modern state's institutionalized forms of "classroom learning" as the cultural–historical context that shapes much of modern learning and socialization. In this analysis, he heavily drew upon Michel Foucault's Discipline and Punish. Holzkamp felt that classroom learning as the historically specific form of learning does not make full use of student's potentials, but rather limits her or his learning potentials by a number of "teaching strategies." Part of his motivation for the book was to look for alternative forms of learning that made use of the enormous potential of the human psyche in more fruitful ways. Consequently, in the last section of the book, Holzkamp discusses forms of "expansive learning" that seem to avoid the limitations of classroom learning, such as apprenticeship and learning in contexts other than classrooms.

This search culminated in plans to write a major work on life leadership in the specific historical context of modern (capitalist) society. Due to his death in 1995, this work never got past the stage of early (and premature) conceptualizations, some of which were published in the journals Forum Kritische Psychologie and Argument.

=== 1960s–1970s ===
In the 1960s and 1970s the term radical psychology was used by psychologists internationally to denote a branch of the field which rejected mainstream psychology's focus on the individual as the basic unit of analysis and sole source of psychopathology. Instead, radical psychologists examined the role of society in causing and treating problems and looked towards social change as an alternative to therapy to treat mental illness and as a means of preventing psychopathology. Within psychiatry the term anti-psychiatry was often used and now British activists prefer the term critical psychiatry. Critical psychology is currently the preferred term for the discipline of psychology keen to find alternatives to the way the discipline of psychology reduces human experience to the level of the individual and thereby strips away possibilities for radical social change.

=== 1990s ===
Starting in the 1990s a new wave of books started to appear on critical psychology, the most influential being the edited book Critical Psychology by Dennis Fox and Isaac Prilleltensky. Various introductory texts to critical psychology written in the United Kingdom have tended to focus on discourse, but this has been seen by some proponents of critical psychology as a reduction of human experience to language which is as politically dangerous as the way mainstream psychology reduces experience to the individual mind. Attention to language and ideological processes, others would argue, is essential to effective critical psychology – it is not simply a matter of applying mainstream psychological concepts to issues of social change.

=== Ian Parker ===
In 1999 Ian Parker published an influential manifesto in both the online journal Radical Psychology and the Annual Review of Critical Psychology. This manifesto argues that critical psychology should include the following four components:

1. Systematic examination of how some varieties of psychological action and experience are privileged over others, how dominant accounts of "psychology" operate ideologically and in the service of power;
2. Study of the ways in which all varieties of psychology are culturally historically constructed, and how alternative varieties of psychology may confirm or resist ideological assumptions in mainstream models;
3. Study of forms of surveillance and self-regulation in everyday life and the ways in which psychological culture operates beyond the boundaries of academic and professional practice; and
4. Exploration of the way everyday "ordinary psychology" structures academic and professional work in psychology and how everyday activities might provide the basis for resistance to contemporary disciplinary practices.

=== Critical psychology today ===
There are a few international journals devoted to critical psychology and critical discussions in Psychology, including Psychology in Society, Theory & Psychology, Culture & Psychology, Feminism & Psychology, Human Development, Annual Review of Critical Psychology and the no longer published International Journal of Critical Psychology (continued in the journal Subjectivity) and Radical Psychology Journal (published for ten years until its final issue in 2011). The journals still tend to be directed to an academic audience, though the Annual Review of Critical Psychology and Psychology in Society runs as an open-access online journal. There are close links between critical psychologists and critical psychiatrists in Britain through the Asylum Collective. David Smail was one of the founders of The Midlands Psychology Group, a critical psychology collective who produced a manifesto for a social materialist psychology of distress. Critical psychology courses and research concentrations are available at Manchester Metropolitan University, York St John University, the University of East London, the University of Edinburgh, the University of KwaZulu Natal, the City University of New York Graduate Center, the University of West Georgia, Point Park University, University of Guelph, York University, and Prescott College. Undergraduate concentrations can also be found at the California Institute of Integral Studies, Prescott College, and at the University of Notre Dame Australia (Fremantle).

== Extensions ==
Like many critical applications, critical psychology has expanded beyond Marxist and feminist roots to benefit from other critical approaches. Consider ecopsychology and transpersonal psychology. Critical psychology and related work has also sometimes been labelled radical psychology and liberation psychology. In the field of developmental psychology, the work of Erica Burman has been influential.

Various sub-disciplines within psychology have begun to establish their own critical orientations. Perhaps the most extensive are critical health psychology, community psychology, and social psychology.

== Aims of Critical Psychology ==
Central themes of critical psychology is the concept of “oppression” and “emancipation”. Critical psychology reflects not only on the connection of mainstream psychology with power, but also work toward emancipation (or liberation). Oppression refers to “a state of asymmetric power relations characterized by domination, subordination, and resistance, where the dominating persons or groups exercise their power by restricting access to material resources and by implanting in the subordinated persons or groups fear or self-deprecating views about themselves”. Emancipation (or liberation) refer to the possibilities of individuals within the social inequalities, doing justice to both, individual and societal domains. Consequently, the aims of critical psychology is the understanding of “oppression” and “liberation” in relation with “Power”.

The spectrum through which the aims of critical psychology is expressed is divided into three different levels of intervention : The micro-level, meso-level, and macro level. Micro-level context refer to the relation of psychology with individuals and groups, the meso-level context refer to the critical reflections of critical psychology on psychology and the re-formation of a psychology not about but for the people, and the macro-level context refer to interventions of critical psychology to create a more equitable society, inviting larger social-agents. A similar reflection is the one that divides possibilities of liberation in relation with power into: aesthetic, interaction, and labor dimension. Aesthetic dimension refer to very personal and individual possibility of liberation through self-expression, the dimension of interaction refer to the deconstruction of oppression in the symbolic and communicative dimension of power (e.g. books, texts, media) and labor refer to liberation from larger socio-political expressions of power (schools, work, health-care). To sum-up, power is practiced in a spectrum from individual- to larger societal level, and thus oppression and possibilities of liberation is also identified within this spectrum. Thus, the aims of critical psychology toward emancipation exceeds from the individual, to the larger societal level of reflection and action.

== Forms of Critical Psychology ==
Understanding and action, is an ongoing debate in the field of critical psychology. The understanding of oppression and the "praxis" of emancipation is two different domains, which is the domain of theory and the domain of action. For this reason it is proposed to divide Critical Psychology into four different forms : (a) critical theoretical psychology, (b) critical theoretical psychology with a practical emancipatory intention, (c) critical empirical psychology, and (d) critical applied psychology. Critical theoretical psychology (a), and critical empirical psychology (c) refers to the theoretical understanding and development of the field, while critical theoretical psychology with practical emancipatory intention, (b) and critical applied psychology (d), has to do with practice and move toward a social change.

== Internationally ==
An early international overview of critical psychology perspectives can be found in Critical Psychology: Voices for Change, edited by Tod Sloan (Macmillan, 2000). In 2015, Ian Parker edited the Handbook of Critical Psychology.

=== Germany ===
At FU-Berlin, critical psychology was not really seen as a division of psychology and followed its own methodology, trying to reformulate traditional psychology on an unorthodox Marxist base and drawing from Soviet ideas of cultural–historical psychology, particularly Aleksey Leontyev. In 1995 the department of critical psychology at FU-Berlin was merged into the traditional psychology department.

An April 2009 issue of the journal Theory & Psychology (edited by Desmond Painter, Athanasios Marvakis, and Leendert Mos) is devoted to an examination of German critical psychology.

=== South Africa ===
The complex sociopolitical history of South Africa, and its relationship with mainstream psychology, created a setting in which critical psychology could be impactful. South Africa is a good example of a context in which mainstream psychology positioned itself alongside neo-colonialism, racism, and capitalist exploitation – during the country's Apartheid era – which led to the need for critical alternatives within the field that could challenge ideological complicities. During apartheid, mainstream psychology supported the oppressive political system – some psychologists actively and others passively. In the early 1980s, at the height of apartheid, progressive white psychologists and a growing number of black psychologists began to research and practice alternative programmes to critique and resist mainstream psychology's role in perpetuating apartheid in South Africa. In this way, critical psychology started to develop in South Africa.

As is the case in other parts of the world, critical psychology in South Africa was born from interrogating psychology in relation to politics. Firstly, psychology was accused of being a product of, and supporter of, an oppressive political system in which its supposed neutrality and scientific objectivity were informed by the sectors of society that benefited from the ideological and economic dominance that it upheld. Secondly, once critical psychologists in South Africa revealed the ideological flaws in mainstream psychology within the country's context, work began to reconfigure the field as a progressive and socially relevant practice with theoretical and methodological approaches that could benefit all members of South African society.

The establishment of critical psychology in South Africa took various forms between 1980 and 1994. Although the field was not necessarily fully formalised during this time, spaces and organisations were created for its ideas to be expressed and developed: such as in the University of Cape Town's (UCT) psychology department, the formation of the Organisation for Appropriate Social Services in South Africa (OASSSA), Psychologists Against Apartheid, the South African Health and Social Services Organisation (SAHSSO), and the establishment of the academic journal Psychology in Society (PINS). Some of the main theoretical and practical achievements of these developments were: the forging of a way to critique the categories of class, race, gender, and other structural factors impacting the discipline of psychology, the encouragement of students to think critically about the politics of psychology, and rebuilding international links as well as relationships with other social and health sciences in South Africa.

However, not all these initiatives continued after the end of political struggle and the transition to democracy. After 1994, professional psychology in South Africa was reorganised through the establishment of the Professional Board for Psychology that exists within the Health Professions Council of South Africa (HPCSA). This statutory body regulates the profession with its systems of licensing and certification. Within these systems, critical psychology is more of an approach to the field than it is a professional category on its own. From the 2000s until recent times, critical psychology moved more toward studying certain domains, such as gender or race, and in the process, the overarching project of establishing a formalised field of critical psychology has either been discarded or broadened to refer to anything that is 'non-mainstream' in psychology. Critical psychology in South Africa is therefore mostly applied as a theoretical approach.

=== United States and Canada ===
The doctoral program in Critical Social/Personality Psychology and Environmental Psychology at the CUNY Graduate Center and the doctoral program in Critical Psychology at Point Park University, in Pittsburgh, PA are the only critical psychology specific doctoral programs in the United States. Prescott College in Prescott, Arizona offers an online Master's program in Critical Psychology and Human Services and has a critically oriented undergraduate program. The California Institute of Integral Studies in San Francisco also offers the Bachelor's Completion Program with a minor in Critical Psychology, and critical perspectives are sometimes encountered in traditional universities, perhaps especially within community psychology programs. The University of West Georgia offers a Ph.D. in Consciousness and Society with critical psychology being one of the main three theoretical orientations. North American efforts include the 1993 founding of RadPsyNet, the 1997 publication of Critical Psychology: An Introduction (edited by Dennis Fox and Isaac Prilleltensky; expanded 2009 edition edited by Dennis Fox, Isaac Prilleltensky, and Stephanie Austin), the 2001 Monterey Conference on Critical Psychology, and in underlying themes of many contributions to the Journal of Social Action in Counseling and Psychology.

== See also ==
- Cultural-historical activity theory
- Positive psychology
- Postmodern psychology
- Psychopolitical validity
- Rhetoric of therapy

=== Societies ===
- International Society of Critical Health Psychology
- Radical Psychology Network
