= Center for Community and Economic Development =

Program at University of Wisconsin

The Center for Community and Economic Development (CCED) is an extension of the University of Wisconsin System. Faculty and staff of The University of Wisconsin–Extension Center have affiliations at the University of Wisconsin–Superior, University of Wisconsin–Madison and the University of Wisconsin–Extension. The Center was founded by Dr. Ron Shaffer in 1990 shortly after publishing "Community Economics: Economic Structure and Change in Smaller Communities". In the preface of that book, Shaffer noted, "There are many citizens in Wisconsin and county extension community development agents whose interest in community economics continually remind me that universities must help them improve their collective economic conditions."

Founding director Ron Shaffer of the Center (Appointed by CNRED Program Leader Ayse Somersan) served the CCED from 1990 - July, 2000.

== See also ==
- Community building
- Community development
- Community economic analysis
- Community economic development
- Community engagement
- Community practice
- Community service
- List of community topics
- Social economy
- Sustainable development
- Urban planning
