= Community organization =

Civil society non-profit operating in a distinct area

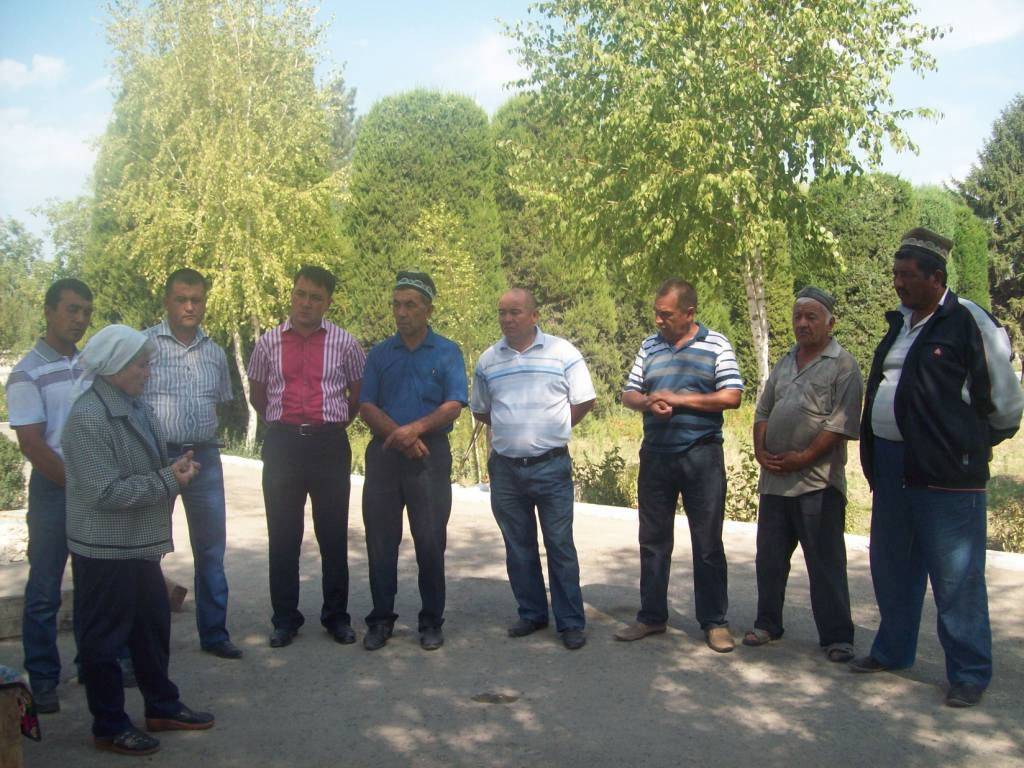
Farming community comes together to discuss innovative ideas

Community organization or community based organization refers to organization aimed at making desired improvements to a community's social health, well-being, and overall functioning. Community organization occurs in geographically, psychosocially, culturally, spiritually, and digitally bounded communities.

Community organization includes community work, community projects, community development, community empowerment, community building, and community mobilization. It is a commonly used model for organizing community within community projects, neighborhoods, organizations, voluntary associations, localities, and social networks, which may operate as ways to mobilize around geography, shared space, shared experience, interest, need, and/or concern.

== Introduction ==
Community organization is differentiated from conflict-oriented community organizing, which focuses on short-term change through appeals to authority (i.e., pressuring established power structures for desired change), by focusing on long-term and short-term change through direct action and the organizing of community (i.e., the creation of alternative systems outside of established power structures). This often includes inclusive networking, interpersonal organizing, listening, reflexivity, non-violent communication, cooperation, mutual aid and social care, prefiguration, popular education, and direct democracy.

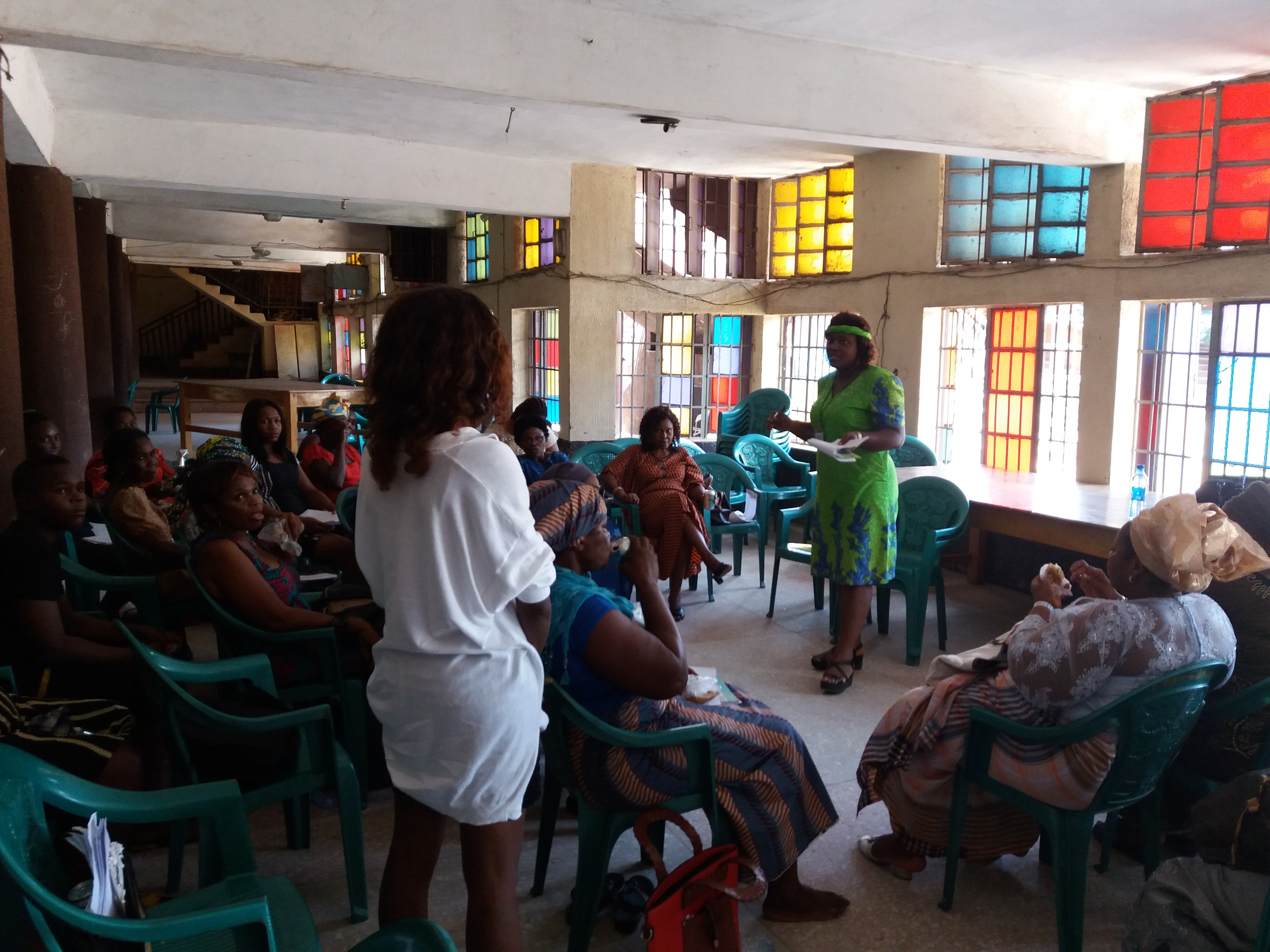
A volunteer community having interaction and making plans on development issues

Within organizations, variations exist in terms of size and structure. Some are formally incorporated, with codified bylaws and Boards of Directors (also known as a committee), while others are much smaller, more informal, and grassroots. Community organization may be more effective in addressing need as well as in achieving short-term and long-term goals than larger, more bureaucratic organizations. Contemporary community organization, known as "The New Community Organizing", includes glocalized perspectives and organizing methods. The multiplicity of institutions, groups, and activities do not necessarily define community organization. Factors such as the interaction, integration, and coordination of, existing groups, assets, activities, as well as the relationships, the evolution of new structures and communities, are characteristics unique to community organization.

Community organization may often lead to greater understanding of community contexts. It is characterized by community building, community planning, direct action and mobilization, the promotion of community change, and, ultimately, changes within larger social systems and power structures along with localized ones.

Community organization generally functions within not-for-profit efforts, and funding often goes directly toward supporting organizing activities. Under globalization, the ubiquity of ICTs, neoliberalism, and austerity, has caused many organizations to face complex challenges such as mission drift and coercion by state and private funders. These political and economic conditions have led some to seek alternative funding sources such as fee-for-service, crowd funding, and other creative avenues.

== Definitions ==
The United Nations in 1955 considered community organization as complementary to community development. The United Nations assumed that community development is operative in marginalized communities and community organization is operative in areas in where levels of living are relatively high and social services relatively well developed, but in where a greater degree of integration and community initiative is recognized as desirable.

In 1955, Murray G. Ross defined community organization as a process by which a community identifies its needs or objectives, orders (or ranks) these needs or objectives, develops the confidence and will to work at these needs or objectives, finds the resources (internal and/or external) to deal with these needs or objectives, takes action in respect to them, and in so doing, extends and develops co-operative and collaborative attitudes and practices within the community.

In 1921, Eduard C. Lindeman defined community organization as "that phase of social organization which constitutes a conscious effort on the part of a community to control its affairs democratically and to secure the highest services from its specialists, organizations, agencies, and institutions by means of recognized interrelations."

In 1925, Walter W. Pettit stated that "Community organization is perhaps best defined as assisting a group of people to recognize their common needs and helping them to meet these needs."

In 1940, Russell H. Kurtz defined community organization as "a process dealing primarily with program relationships and thus to be distinguished in its social work setting from those other basic processes, such as casework and group work. Those relationships of agency to agency, of agency to community and of community to agency reach in all directions from any focal point in the social work picture. Community organization may be thought of as the process by which these relationships are initiated, altered or terminated to meet changing conditions, and it is thus basic to all social work..."

In 1947, Wayne McMillen defined community organization as "in its generic sense in deliberately directed effort to assist groups in attaining unity of purpose and action. It is practiced, though often without recognition of its character, wherever the objective is to achieve or maintain a pooling of the talents and resources of two or more groups in behalf of either general or specific objectives."

In 1954, C. F. McNeil said "Community organization for social welfare is the process by which the people of community, as individual citizens or as representatives of groups, join together to determine social welfare needs, plan ways of meeting then and mobilise the necessary resource."

In 1967, Murray G. Ross defined community organization as a process by which a community identifies needs or objectives, takes action, and through this process, develops cooperative and collaborative attitudes and practices within a community.

In 1975, Kramer and Specht stated "Community organization refers to various methods of intervention whereby a professional change agent helps a community action system composed of individuals, groups, or organizations to engage in planned collective action in order to deal with special problems within the democratic system of values."

=== Related term comparison ===
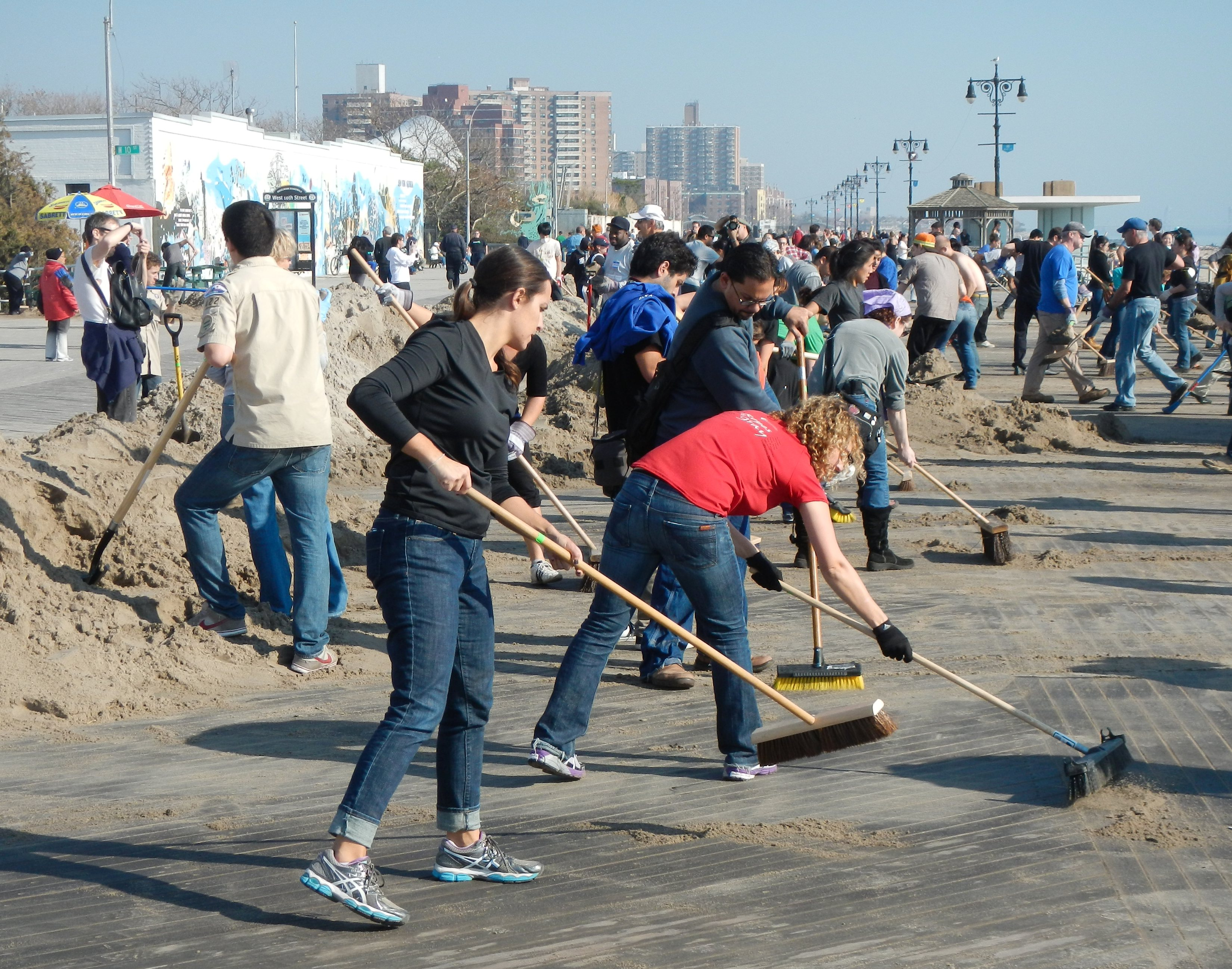
A group of organized community members playing a role in community development

Community organization and community development are interrelated, and both have their roots in community social work. To achieve the goals of community development the community organization method is used. According to United Nations, community development deals with total development of a developing country, including economic, physical, and social aspects. For achieving total development, community organization is used. In community development the aspects like democratic procedures, voluntary cooperation, self-help, development of leadership, awareness and sensitisation are considered as important. The same aspects are also considered as important by community organization.

== History ==
Informal associations of people focused on the common good have existed in most societies. The first formal precursor to the Community Benefit Organization was recorded in Elizabethan England to overcome the acute problem of poverty, which led to beggary. In England, Elizabethan poor law (1601) was set up to provide services to the needy. The London Society of Organizing Charitable Relief and Repressing Mendicancy and the settlement house movement followed in England during the late 1800s.

This model of community organizing was carried into the United States of America. In 1880, the Charities organization was set up to put rational order in the area of charity and relief. The first citywide Charity Organization Society (COS) was established in Buffalo, New York, US, in 1877. Rev. S. H. Gurteen, an English priest who had moved to Buffalo in 1873, gave led COS to outreach in more than 25 American cities. The American Association for Community Organization was organized in 1918 as the national agency for chests and councils and it later became known as community chests and councils of America (CCC). The Cincinnati Public Health Federation, established in 1917, was the first independent health council in an American city.

In 1946, at the National Conference of Social Work met in Buffalo, where the Association of the Study of Community Organization (ASCO) was organized. The main objective was to improve the professional practice of organization for social welfare. In 1955, ASCO merged with six other professional organizations to form the National Association of Social Workers. The Settlement movement and "settlement houses" are historically significant examples of community organizations, participating in both organizing and development at the neighborhood level. Settlement houses were commonly located in the industrial cities of the East and Midwest during the beginning of the 20th century; Jane Addams' Hull House in Chicago, Illinois, was a notable example. They were largely established in working-class neighborhoods by the college educated children of middle class citizens concerned by the substantial social problems that were the results of the increasing industrialization and urbanization of the social settlement movement. History shows that innovative methods of community organizing have risen in response to vast social problems. The social problems at the time of settlement houses included child labor, working class poverty, and housing. Settlement workers thought that by providing education services (English classes) and social services (employment assistance, legal aid, recreational programs, children services) to the poor the income gap between them and the middle class would regress. The majority of funding for services came from charitable resources.

Another development in the history of American community development occurred in the wake of World War II. Of prime importance were the American Red Cross and United Service Organizations (USO), which recruited an immense number of people for volunteer services during the war. After World War II, the focus of community organization fell onto rising problems like rehabilitation of the physically and mentally challenged, mental health planning, destitution, abandoned aging population, juvenile delinquency, etc.

The historical development of community organization in the UK is divided into four phases, according to Baldock in 1974:

1. First Phase (1880-1920): During this period community work was mainly seen as a method of social work. It was considered a process of helping individuals enhance their social adjustments. It acted as major player to co-ordinate the work of voluntary agencies.
2. Second phase (1920-1950): This period saw the emergence of new ways of dealing with social issues and problems. The community organization was closely associated with central and state government programs for urban development. The important development in this period was its association with the community association movement.
3. Third phase (1950 onwards): This period emerged as a reaction to the neighborhood idea, which provided an ideological phase for the second phase. The professional development of social work took place during this period. Understanding the shortcomings in the existing system, it was a period where the social workers sought for a professional identity.
4. Fourth phase: The ongoing period that has marked a significant involvement of the community action. It questioned the very relationship of the community work and social work. It was thus seen as period of radical social movement and we could see the conflicts of community with authority. The association of social workers and the community are deprofessionalized during this period. Thus it was during this period the conflictual strategies that were introduced in the community work.

=== Categories ===
Typically community organizations fall into the following categories: community-service and action, health, educational, personal growth and improvement, social welfare and self-help for the disadvantaged.

Community-based organizations (CBOs) which operates within the given locality insures the community with sustainable provision of community service and actions in health, education, personal growth and improvement, social welfare and self-help for the disadvantaged its sustainability becomes healthier and possible because the community is directly involved in the action or operation wherever and whenever monetary and non-monetary support or contribution is generated. Amateur sports clubs, school groups, church groups, youth groups and community support groups are all typical examples of community organizations.

In developing countries (like those in Sub-Saharan Africa) community organizations often focus on community strengthening, including HIV/AIDS awareness, human rights (like the Karen Human Rights Group), health clinics, orphan children support, water and sanitation provision, and economic issues. Somewhere else social animators are also concentrating on uncommon issues, like Chengara struggle, Kerala, India and Ghosaldanga Adivasi Seva Sangh which is reported in West Bengal, India.

== Models ==
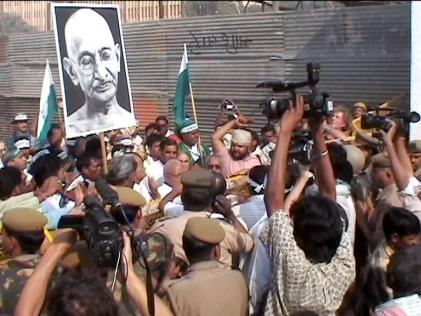
Janadesh 2007 - a social action movement for land rights in India

In 1970, Jack Rothman formulated three basic models of community organization.

- Locality Development - A method of working with community organizations. Initially used by the Settlement House movement, the primary focus was community building and community empowerment. Leadership development, mutual aid, and popular education were considered essential components to this participatory process. Locality development is aimed at meeting the needs of target populations in a defined area (e.g., neighborhood, housing block, tenement housing, school, etc.).
- Social Planning - A method of working with a large population. The focus is in evaluating welfare needs and existing services in the area and planning a possible blue print for a more efficient delivery of services to the social problems. It is a responsive model to the needs and attitudes of the community. E.g. Housing, health insurance, affordable education, etc.
- Social Action - A strategy used by groups, sub communities, or even national organizations that feel that they have inadequate power and resources to meet their needs. They confront the dominant power structure using conflict as a method to solve their issues related to inequalities and deprivation. E.g. A structural systems change in social policies that brings disparities between people of different socioeconomic conditions in social rights like educational policies, employment policies, etc.

In the late 1990s, Rothman revisited the three community organization typologies of locality development, social planning, and social action, and reflected that they were too rigid as "community processes had become more complex and variegated, and problems had to be approached differently, more subtly, and with greater penetrability." This led to a broadened view of the models as more expansive, nuanced, situational, and interconnected. According to Rothman, the reframing of the typologies as overlapping and integrated ensured that "practitioners of any stripe [have] a greater range in selecting, then mixing and phasing, components of intervention."

Rothman's three basic models of community organization have been critiqued and expanded upon. Feminist community organization scholar, Cheryl Hyde, criticized Rothman's "mixing and phasing" as unable to transcend rigid categorical organizing typologies, as they lacked "dimensions of ideology, longitudinal development ... commitment within community intervention and incorporati[on] [of] social movement literature."

== Principles ==
Principles are expressions of value judgments. It is the generalized guiding rules for a sound practice. Arthur Dunham in 1958 formulated a statement of 28 principles of community organization and grouped those under seven headings. They are:

1. Democracy and social welfare;
2. Community roots for community programs;
3. Citizen understanding, support, and participation and professional service;
4. Co-operation;
5. Social Welfare Programs;
6. Adequacy, distribution, and organization of social welfare services; and
7. Prevention.

In India, Siddiqui in 1997 worked out a set of principles based on the existing evidence based indigenous community organization practices.

1. Objective movement
2. Specific planning
3. Active peoples participation
4. Inter-group approach
5. Democratic functioning
6. Flexible organisation
7. Utilisation of available resources
8. Cultural orientation

== Impact of globalization ==
Globalization is fundamentally changing the landscape of work, organizations, and community. Many of the challenges created by globalization involve divestment from local communities and neighborhoods, and a changing landscape of work. Paired with the transition to post-industrialization, both challenges and opportunities for grassroots community organizations are growing. Scholars such as Grace Lee Boggs and Gar Alperovitz are noted for their visionary understandings of community organization in this changing context. At the core of these understandings is the acknowledgement that "communities" exist in the context of local, national, and global influences. These and other scholars emphasize the need to create new social, economic, and political systems through community organization, as a way to rebuild local wealth in this changing landscape. Related concepts include visionary organizing, community wealth projects, employee-owned firms, anchor institutions, and place-based education.

In the era of globalization smaller community organizations typically rely on donations (monetary and in-kind) from local community members and sponsorship from local government and businesses. In Canada, for example, slightly over 40% of the community organizations surveyed had revenue under C$30,000. These organizations tend to be relationship-based and people-focused. Across all sizes, Canadian community organizations rely on government funding (49%), earned income (35%), and others through gifts and donations (13%).

== See also ==
- Benefit corporation
- Charitable organization
- Community-based program design
- Community engagement
- Community management
- Community organizing
- Fundraising
- Participatory rural appraisal
- Poor People's Economic Human Rights Campaign
- Social audit
- Trickle-down economics
