= Community-based program design =

Community-based program design is a social method for designing programs that enables social service providers, organizers, designers and evaluators to serve specific communities in their own environment. This program design method depends on the participatory approach of community development often associated with community-based social work, and is often employed by community organizations. From this approach, program designers assess the needs and resources existing within a community, and, involving community stakeholders in the process, attempt to create a sustainable and equitable solution to address the community's needs.

Similar to traditional program design, community-based program design often utilizes a range of tools and models which are meant to enhance the efficacy and outcomes of the program's design. The difference between traditional design and community-based design, when using these tools, is in the dynamics of the relationship between the designers, the participants, and the community as a whole. It evolved from the Charity Organization Society (COS) and the settlement house movements.

One advantage is a learning experience between a consumer and a social services provider. One disadvantage is a limited availability of resources. The models that can be used for it are:

- the social-ecological model, which provides a framework for program design,
- the logic model, which is a graphical depiction of logical relationships between the resources, activities, outputs and outcomes of a program,
- the social action model, whose objectives are to recognize the change around a community in order to preserve or improve standards, understand the social action process/model is a conceptualization of how directed change takes place, and understand how the social action model can be implemented as a successful community problem solving tool,
- and program evaluation, which involves the ongoing systematic assessment of community-based programs.

== History ==
Community practice in social work is linked with the historical roots of the profession's beginning in the United States. More specifically, the history of community-based social work has evolved from the Charity Organization Society (COS) and the settlement house movements. However, during the earlier half of the 20th century, much of this work targeted the mentally ill and focused on institutionalization. Not until the 1960s did the shift from institutions to communities, known as deinstitutionalization, increase the emphasis on community-based program design. Community-based organizations and community-based programs burgeoned because of this. The poor conditions of mental health institutions and an increasing amount of research that illustrated the benefits of maintaining the relationships of the individuals served within the community surfaced to further the growth of community-based programs.

Although social work has been historically defined by these institutionalized and deinstitutionalized periods, informal community design programs have always existed. In fact, informal community-based programs predate human service applications of this approach. In 1990, Bernice Harper illustrated this point in the book Social Work Practice with Black Families: A Culturally Specific Perspective in regards to African American communities, by writing that:

Blacks have always cared for the sick at home, yet it was never labeled 'home care.' Blacks have been dying at home and receiving care in the process, yet it was never called 'hospice care.' Blacks have relieved each other from the caring and curing processes, yet it was never seen as 'respite care.' Blacks have cared for each other in their homes, in their neighborhoods, and throughout their communities, yet it was never referred to as 'volunteerism.'

== Advantages and challenges ==
=== Advantages ===
Benefits of community-based program design include gaining insight into the social context of an issue or problem, mutual learning experiences between consumer and provider, broadening understanding of professional roles and responsibilities within the community, interaction with professionals from other disciplines, and opportunities for community-based participatory research projects. Increased sustainability is an advantage of community-based program design. The program sustainability is ensured by the identification of solutions to problems based on existing resources accessible to all community members. Also, the involvement of local community leaders and local volunteers reinforce the sustainability of the impact of the program.

=== Challenges ===
Some challenges of community-based program design are the limited availability of resources, propensity for high levels of staff turnover, the reliance upon unpaid volunteers, participant retention, and the evaluation of a dynamic task environment. For the same reasons that sustainability is an advantage of this approach, utilizing limited available resources is a challenge. Based on free market principals and resource scarcity, programs often operate below pareto efficiency.

== Program design tools ==
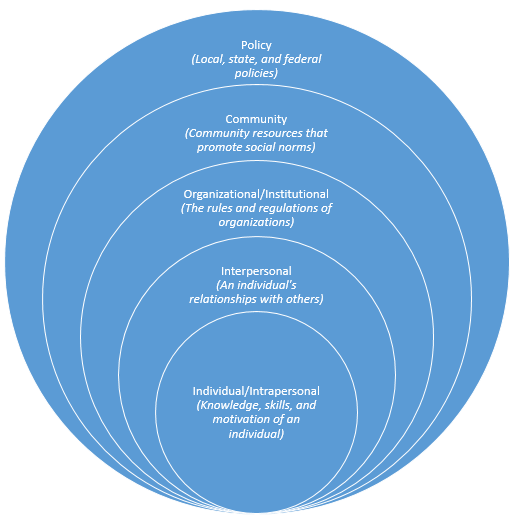
A diagram of the social-ecological model

=== Socio-ecological model ===
One model for program design is the socio-ecological model. This model enables an understanding of the factors that can influence a community. It demonstrates five levels of influence, which are the individual/intrapersonal, the interpersonal, the organizational/institutional, the community, and the policy.

=== Logic model ===
Another common tool of program design that can be employed is the logic model. Logic models are a graphical depiction of the logical relationships between the resources, activities, outputs and outcomes of a program. The underlying purpose of constructing a logic model is to assess how a program's activities will affect its outcomes. This model was first used as a tool to identify performance, but it has been adapted to program planning over time.

=== Social action model ===
For community-based programs that seek to address macro-issues, the social action model may be utilized. The objectives of the social action model are to recognize the change around us in order to preserve or improve standards, understand the social action process/model is a conceptualization of how directed change takes place; and understand how the social action model can be implemented as a successful community problem solving tool.

=== Evaluation ===
An emerging and growing practice of program design is program evaluation. Evaluation can be seen as a cycle which involves the ongoing systematic assessment of a community-based program by collecting data from it, reviewing the data, changing the program as the data recommends, and then collecting data again. Program designers often choose to incorporate evaluation into design in order to check program processes, determine impact, build a base of support, and/or justify replication/expansion.

== Anthropological Model ==
The community-based program design is a method utilized in the field of applied anthropology. In the mid to late 20th century, anthropologists focusing on research program design discovered that excluding the desire, input, and commitment of local communities and people (for which problems were being attempted to be solved) would be unsuccessful and unsustainable without some type of community-based methodology. Additionally, there are examples, from the past 20 years, of social scientists like anthropologists utilizing collaborative strategies with the communities that they research and study to introduce ideas that can enact change at the individual level and even on a global scale. Applied anthropologists use the community-based model to help indigenous groups recognize and construct their individualized "theories of need and change" and even help these groups accumulate the various forms of capital required to address those needs, including financial resources, and political support. When conducting community-based research, it is imperative that an anthropologist establish a definition of the community they will be working with by identifying the community members and stakeholders of such said community and provide justification or clear reasoning for the defined community group.

An example of the anthropological model can be found within the field of medical anthropology and the work conducted by medical anthropologist Paul Farmer. In 1998, Farmer and his colleagues developed a community-based model of care in order to provide free and comprehensive HIV treatment in impoverished areas of Haiti. The winning key strategy that Farmer and his contemporaries developed out of the community-based model was the use of community health workers, who would check on patients at their own homes to make sure patients were taking their medications correctly and regularly. Due to Paul Farmer's success of the medical community-based program design in Haiti, Farmer and his colleagues were invited to duplicate their efforts in Lima, Peru in order to combat drug-resistant tuberculosis; and, subsequently, the Clinton Foundation leaned on Farmer's organization Partners in Health to support medical efforts in the government of Rwanda. Partners in Health was able to rebuild the government's local infrastructure by building new hospitals and health centers and introduced low-cost medicines and therapies through the use of community health workers.

== See also ==
- Charitable organization
- Community-based participatory research
- Community organization
- Nonprofit organization
