= Community work =

Community work may refer to

- Community service: unpaid work performed by a person or group of people for the benefit and betterment of their community without any form of compensation
- Community practice: a branch of social work that focuses on larger social systems and social change,
