= Butsneve =

Village in Ukraine

Coordinates: 49°13′23″N 27°26′36″E

Butsneve (Ukrainian: Буцневе) in a village in Khmelnytskyi Raion, (Note: Before the 2020 Ukraine administrative reform the place was part of the Derazhnia Raion) Khmelnytskyi Oblast, Ukraine.

According to the 2001 Ukrainian Census, the population was 409 (down from 488 in 1989).

The population for 2015 is 347 people.

== History ==
The 1880 Geographical Dictionary of the Kingdom of Poland says that Bucniowa (or Bucniów), Russian: Буцнево, was included in gmina Derażnia of powiat latyczowski (Letichevsky Uyezd, Podolian Governorate, Russian Empire), with population of 554, including 54 persons of odnodvortsy (petty szlachta deprived of nobility in Russian Empire). It should not be confused with Bucniowce (Буцневцы, Butsnevtsy) situated in a close location.
