= Foundation for Socio-Economic Justice =

The Foundation for Socio-Economic Justice (FSEJ) was founded in 2003 as an umbrella organization with a primary vision of initiating broad civic education programs to encourage democratic participation and raise awareness on human and constitutional rights amongst the rural populations of Eswatini. The primary goal of FSEJ is to help build a solid and unified mass based democratic force.

FSEJ is a member of the Eswatini Council of NGOs and is active in a number of civil society networks and organisations that focus on social, political and economical issues. FSEJ also works together with five strategic partners (Community organizations): Lawyers for Human Rights, Eswatini National Union of Students, Eswatini Economic Justice Forum, Street Vendors Association, Eswatini Labour Academy, and Eswatini National Ex-Mine Workers.

The mission of FSEJ is to strengthen democracy in the rural population through its member affiliates by conducting civic education and networking. FSEJ works with community-based organization and non-governmental organization in the local context and is also part of several international networks. In line with this and with a vision of building a democratic movement in Eswatini, FSEJ also wishes to strengthen the capacity and links between these organisations as well as its own ties with the organisations.

The overall goal of the foundation is to “build a mass-based democratic force” through a bottom-up approach that includes partnership with, and capacity building of, marginalized, rural based organisations. In a sense, the Foundation is therefore a complementary organisation to the largely urban-based political organisations such as the newly founded Eswatini United Democratic Front (ESUDF), both because it looks at the preconditions for the processes that these organisations are trying to implement and because it is politically non-aligned and welcomes people from all political persuasions and organisations.

FSEJ has participated in a range of non-governmental organization coordinating activities; for example in support of the Eswatini United Democratic Front (ESUDF). FSEJ has built a strong management of donor support projects which the SUDF can use.

FSEJ is a member of the Coordinating Assembly of non-governmental organizations and is active in a number of civil society networks and organisations focusing on social, political and economical issues. It cooperates with trade unions, teachers associations, Eswatini Coalition of Concerned Civic Organizations, Lutheran Development Centre, The Council of Eswatini Churches and the Coordinating Assembly of None Governmental Organizations (CANGO). FSEJ also collaborates with the regional network, The Southern African People’s Network (SAPSN).

FSEJ holds an annual general meeting every three years where all affiliated member organizations are invited. At the meetings, the affiliate member organizations elect a seven-member board of directors. The FSEJ implementing project committee consists primarily of professionals and volunteers.
