= Macro social work =

Specific Approach to Social Work

Macro social work is the use of social work skills, training, and perspective to produce large-scale social change or social justice of some kind. Unlike micro or mezzo social work, which deals with individual and small group issues, macro social work aims to address societal problems at their roots; however, it has recently not received the same level of importance.

== Professional roles and functions ==
Macro social workers work in a variety of public institutions, including legislative (as elected officials and advocates), executive (as administrators, managers, researchers and experts) or judicial (as expert witnesses in courts) at the federal, state, or local level. Macro social workers are also found in the private sector usually in executive positions in their respective organizations. Historically, social work included both micro and macro practice, but there has been a generational trend towards micro practice, which focuses on therapeutic work with people, families, and groups.

== Scope and importance ==
Macro social work is a branch of social work that focuses on large-scale social processes and systemic issues. It involves interventions and strategies that target communities, organizations, and policy to promote social change, justice, and the well-being of populations.

Macro social work encompasses a broad range of activities including advocacy, community organizing, policy analysis, program development, and business administration. Practitioners in this field work to influence social policies, develop and implement social programs, and lead community initiatives. They aim to address systemic issues such as poverty, discrimination, and inequality by promoting policies that lead to equitable distribution of resources and opportunities.

One of the key aspects of macro social work is its focus on social justice. Social workers in this field advocate for policies that ensure equal access to services and resources, protect human rights, and address social injustices. This can involve lobbying for legislative changes, participating in public debates, and working with marginalized communities to amplify their voices.

== History of macro social work practice ==
The roots of macro social work can be traced back to the settlement house movement in the late 19th and early 20th centuries. Social workers like Jane Addams and Mary Richmond sought to address the root causes of poverty and inequality through community-based interventions and policy advocacy. This tradition has evolved over time to include various approaches and methodologies aimed at systemic change.

The inception of macro social work practice in the United States (although it was not called by that name at the time) was with the advent of social work as an academic discipline itself. In 1889, Jane Addams co-founded Hull House in Chicago with her colleague, Ellen Gates Starr. At Hull House, the Women's Trade Union League of Chicago was established, an organization that advocated for labor legislation aimed at improving women's working conditions. Addams worked to reform political systems that kept women dependent and vulnerable to abuse.

Mary Richmond, an early social work practitioner, administrator, and author, began her career with a Charity Organization Society in Baltimore, Maryland. Richmond advocated for interventions across multiple levels of practice, which are now known as micro, mezzo, and macro. During the Progressive Era and later the New Deal, macro social workers helped build social welfare programs, advocated for reforms, and helped establish community organization as a recognized method of social work.

== Methods and approaches ==
The methods employed by macro social workers are aimed at accomplishing their stated goals. All "methods" are not the same, but rather change and evolve depending on the social, political, and economic climate within a given country or organization they are employed within.

Some methods include: advocacy, passing bills or laws (if the social worker is an elected official), persuasion skills, collective action, and partnering with non social workers who have a similar goal.

Macro social work employs diverse methods across four levels: community, organizational, societal, and global:

1. At the community level, it involves planning and policy development, community organizing, and development strategies such as community economic and social development, focusing on participation, empowerment, and leadership.
2. Organizational level methods include building and managing nonprofit agencies and social enterprises, emphasizing social entrepreneurship and effective social administration, including program planning and organizational change.
3. At the societal level, macro social workers engage in advocacy and social action, using policy advocacy and social movements to drive systemic change and promote social justice.
4. Globally, they address issues through international social work, collaborating with NGOs to tackle poverty, human rights, and refugee crises, and supporting global advocacy efforts for sustainable development.

These methods integrate traditional and innovative approaches to empower communities, foster leadership, and achieve equitable social change.

Today, macro social work is a dynamic field that adapts to contemporary social issues. Practitioners often employ a variety of strategies to achieve their goals, including community organizing, which involves mobilizing community members to take collective action on issues affecting them. Policy practice is another critical area, where social workers engage in the analysis, development, and implementation of social policies.

== Future directions in macro social work ==
Macro social work plays a vital role in addressing the root causes of social problems and advocating for systemic change. By focusing on large-scale interventions, macro social workers aim to create a more just and equitable society. As social issues continue to evolve, the field must adapt and innovate to effectively address the complexities of contemporary social challenges. Recent discussions about a "re-envisioning" of macro social work practice emphasize a renewed focus on enhancing the macro dimensions of social work, which include policy advocacy, community development, and organizational leadership. This movement challenges the social work profession's dwindling focus on macro practice, with the goal of realigning it with its historical foundations and current needs. The transition to micro practice is due to rising demand for emergency relief services, economic and legislative changes, and the organization's focus on survival via clinical service supply. McBeath recommends ten key changes for reinvigorating macro social work practice:

1. Develop external advocacy networks: Build networks with institutions influencing social welfare funding and policy.
2. Cultivate agency–university partnerships: Create collaborations to develop and test new macro practice models.
3. Support interprofessional exploration: Engage with other professions to share knowledge and innovate.
4. Leverage technology for advocacy: Use technology to enhance networking, advocacy, and information sharing.
5. Implement equity-focused frameworks: Use equity frameworks to evaluate social welfare initiatives.
6. Strengthen linkages to micro practice: Bridge the gap between micro and macro practice to create a unified professional identity.
7. Conduct environmental scanning: Continuously assess societal needs to adapt macro practice models.
8. Develop theory-informed practice: Integrate social science theories into macro practice.
9. Promote evidence-informed practice: Use diverse evidence to inform macro practice decisions.
10. Center practice around human rights: Ensure macro practice prioritizes human rights promotion and protection.

In order to effectively address these issues besides social justice and structural change, the social work profession must integrate macro and micro practices and promote multidisciplinary cooperation. With a renewed emphasis, the goal is to strike a balance between organizational, community, and social backdrop shaping work and frontline service delivery. In addressing these aspects in social work education, future curricula should also focus on managerial skills and competences.

Previous discussions about the state of macro practice so far focused on different aspects that need to be overcome in the future. The trajectory of macro practice in social work education is increasingly recognizing the importance of organizational and management skills. A robust macro practice curriculum should include policy analysis, community organizing, leadership, and financial management, which are often underrepresented in social work management education. Researchers said efforts to strengthen macro social work education and research should be aimed at program deans and directors.

See also

- List of American elected officials who are social workers
- Social policy
