= Community building =

Social process

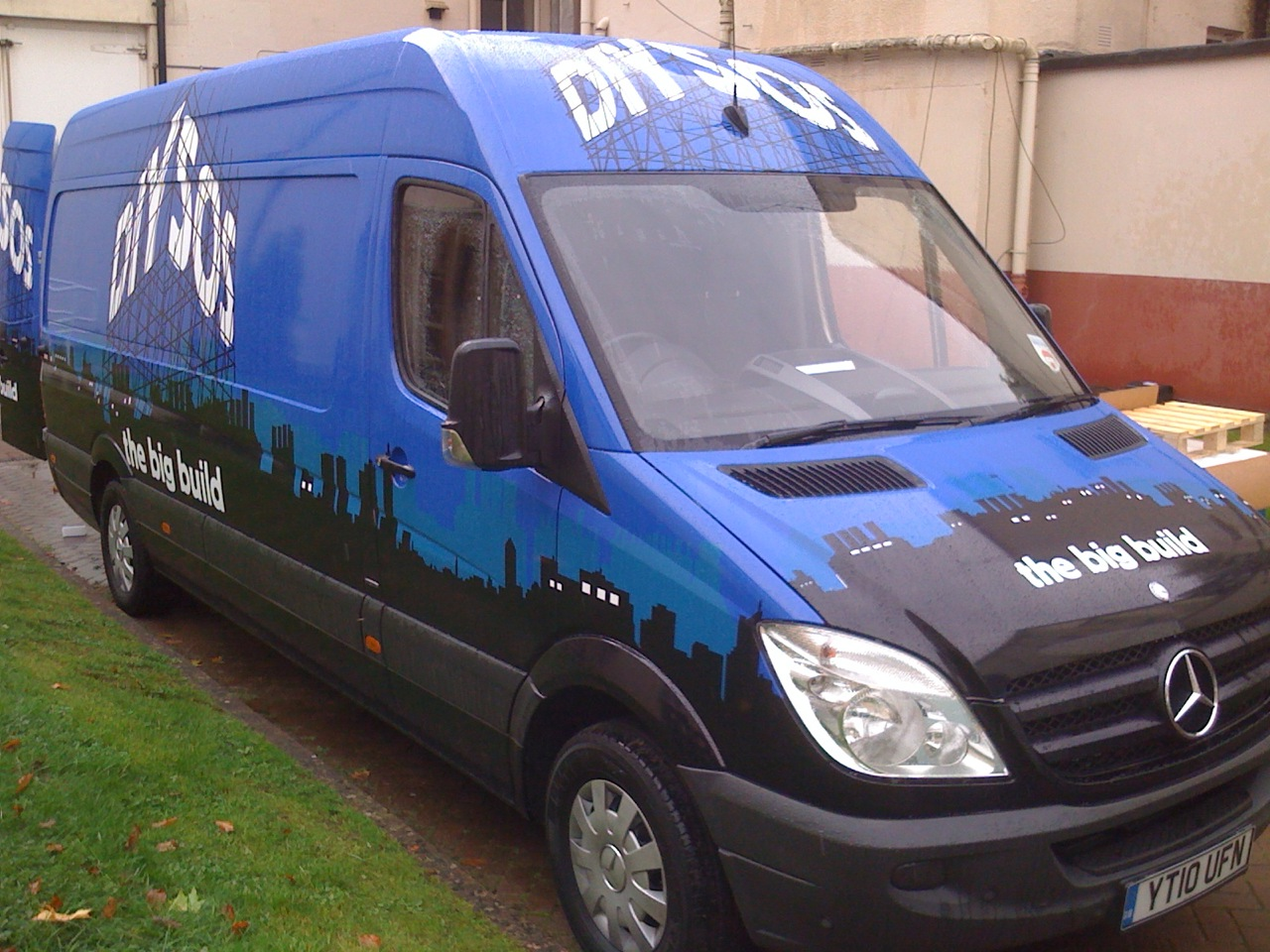
DIY SOS van from UK TV show focused on community building

Community building is a field of practices directed toward the creation or enhancement of community among individuals within a regional area (such as a neighborhood) or with a common need or interest. It is often encompassed under the fields of community organizing, community organization, community work, and community development.

A wide variety of practices can be utilized/implemented to define culture for community development/building, ranging from simple events like potlucks and small book clubs, to larger–scale efforts such as mass festivals and building construction projects that involve local participants rather than outside contractors.

Activists and community workers engaged in community building efforts in industrialized nations see the apparent loss of community in these societies as a key cause of social disintegration and the emergence of many harmful behaviors. They may see building community as a means to address perceived social inequality and injustice, individual and collective well-being, and the negative impacts of otherwise disconnected and/or marginalized individuals.

== Rebuilding ==
Leadership, geography, history, socio-economic status all are traditionally used to explain success of community and its well-being. Robert Putnam in his book Bowling Alone finds that a community's well-being is dependent on the quality of relationships among the citizens of that community. He refers to this as social capital. Social capital creates a sense of belonging thus enhancing the overall health of a community. Putnam goes on to identify and examine the decline of social capital in America. Pressures of time and money, suburbanization, the effect of electronic entertainment, and perhaps most importantly the generational change appear to have all been contributing factors in the decline of social capital.

"We must learn to view the world through a social capital lens," said Lew Feldstein of the New Hampshire Charitable Foundation and co-chair of the Saguaro Seminar. "We need to look at front porches as crime fighting tools, treat picnics as public health efforts and see choral groups as occasions of democracy. We will become a better place when assessing social capital impact becomes a standard part of decision-making."...

Peter Block in the book Community: The Structure of Belonging (pg. 29) states "The context that restores community is one of possibility, generosity, and gifts, rather than one of problem solving, fear, and retribution." This context allows a new conversation to take place. It requires its citizens to act authentic by choosing to own and exercise their power rather than delegating to others what is in the best interest of that community. Focus must be inclusive for all, not just the leaders but each and every citizen of that community.

While building a community, beliefs are at the base of that community. Some foundational beliefs are functional, ethical, value-laden, social, cultural, spiritual, economic, political, rights-oriented, and valuing of diversity.

== Sense of community ==
"Community is something we do together. It's not just a container", said sociologist David Brain. Infrastructure, roads, water, sewer, electricity and housing provides the shell within which people live. It is within this shell that people do the things together that allow them to sustain livelihoods. These include but are not limited to education, health care, business, recreation, and spiritual celebration. People working together with shared understandings and expectations are what provide a place of strong community.

=== Definition ===
There are several ways that people may form a community, which subsequently influence the way a community may be strengthened:

1. Locus, a sense of place, referred to a geographic entity ranging from neighborhood to city size, or a particular milieu around which people gathered (such as a church or recreation center).
2. Sharing common interests and perspectives, referred to common interests and values that could cross-geographic boundaries.
3. Joint action, a sense of coherence and identity, included informal common activities such as sharing tasks and helping neighbors, but these were not necessarily intentionally designed to create community cohesion.
4. Social ties involved relationships that created the ongoing sense of cohesion.
5. Diversity referring not primarily to ethnic groupings, but to the social complexity within communities in which a multiplicity of communities co-exist.

== Activities ==
=== Gardening ===
Community gardening helps to improve neighborhood, build a sense of community, and connect to the environment by planting and harvesting fresh produce and plants.

=== Technology centers ===
Community Technology Centers (CTCs), such as those modeled under the Free Geek franchise activist model, have proven to be loci of support and organization for communities. Much like community gardens and other functional communities, CTCs have been found to promote individual and collective efficacy, community empowerment and community organization; community health and well-being, a sense of belonging and community; racial, ethnic, and class consciousness development; and an alleviation of the digital divide, community disempowerment, and poverty.

CTCs have also fostered connections between glocalized ecosocial issues such as environmental destruction and public health and welfare through the reuse of technology and ethical electronic waste (e-waste) stewardship.

=== Sharing of gifts ===
Music, dance, gardening, craftsmanship, mechanics, any skills or knowledge shared provide excellent opportunities for community-building. Service oriented activities invite individuals to strengthen relationships and build rapport as they help one another. The sharing of gifts strengthens the community as a whole and lays a foundation for future successes in the community’s endeavors due to the overall well-being and unity produced.

=== Activism ===
Activism (different from community organizing) is taking action to produce social change. The uniting of communities with an activist perspective may produce a social movement.

=== Organizing ===
Organizing is a major way that communities unite. When the term “organizing” is used, it usually means that a group of less powerful people is banding together to solve a problem. There are several means by which communities are organizing. The most recent is through social media. Community organizing is distinguishable from activism if activists engage in social protest without a strategy for building power or for making specific social changes. According to Phil Brown, community organizing is the vehicle that brings the social cohesion and broad coherence to neighborhoods and municipalities, which in turn produces successful environmental justice actions.

== Environment ==
Community building efforts may lay the groundwork for larger organizing efforts around issues, such as the negative environmental and health effects of toxic waste pollution, ecosocial justice, ecological justice, environmental justice, and the unequal burden and impacts of such effects on oppressed and marginalized communities. Prior emphases on conservation, preservation, endangered species, rainforest destruction, ozone layer depletion, acid rain—as well as other national global concerns—often had no perceived relevance to individuals and communities with privileged immunity to such effects. These emphases kept the environmental movement a largely middle class and upper middle class movement.

Due to the spread of ecosocial problems and burdens to privileged areas within the Global North, glocalized perspectives have emerged, as well as organizing practices in line with these ideas (see alter-globalization). Groups may be as influential as the United Nations or as small and local as neighborhoods. The Natural Resources Defense Council lists many publicly organized community-building groups created to decrease the ecological footprint and reduce the environmental impact of humans.

== See also ==
- Civic engagement
- Community economic development
- Community organizing
- Community organization
- Community practice
- Community of practice
- Community Engagement
- Community Mobilization
- Community gardening
- Community technology centers
- New urbanism
- Alter-globalization
