= David W. Slater =

Canadian economist (1921–2010)

President of York University
- In office 1970–1973
- Preceded by: Murray G. Ross
- Succeeded by: H. Ian Macdonald

Personal details
- Born: 1921 Winnipeg, Manitoba
- Died: February 9, 2010 (aged 88–89) Ottawa, Ontario

David Walker Slater (1921 – February 9, 2010) was a Canadian economist, civil servant and former President of York University.

Born in Winnipeg, Manitoba, he received a Bachelor of Commerce degree in 1942 from the University of Manitoba. After serving with the Canadian Army in World War II in Europe (and being Mentioned in Dispatches), he received a Bachelor of Arts degree in economics in 1947 from Queen's University. He received a Master of Arts degree in 1950 and a Ph.D. in 1957 from the University of Chicago.

In 1952, he joined the faculty of Queen's University teaching economics as an assistant professor, becoming associate professor in 1957 and Professor in 1961. From 1968 to 1970, he was Dean of the School of Graduate Studies. From 1970 to 1973, he was the second President of York University.

Joining the Canadian civil service, he was appointed General Director, Fiscal Policy and Economic Analysis Branch, Department of Finance in 1973. From 1978 to 1985, he was the Director and then Chairman of the Economic Council of Canada.

In 1986, he was appointed Chairman of the Government of Ontario's Task Force on Insurance.

He died in 2010 in Ottawa.
