= H. Ian Macdonald =

Hugh Ian Macdonald
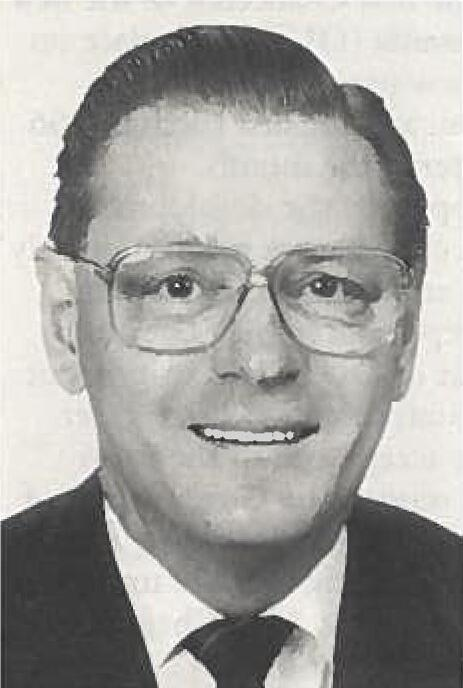

President of York University
- In office 1974–1984
- Preceded by: David W. Slater
- Succeeded by: Harry Arthurs

Personal details
- Born: June 27, 1929 (age 96) Toronto, Ontario

Hugh Ian Macdonald, OC, KLJ (born June 27, 1929) is a Canadian economist, civil servant, and was President of York University from 1974 to 1984.

== Biography ==
Born in Toronto, Ontario, Macdonald received a Bachelor of Commerce degree from the University of Toronto in 1952. A Rhodes scholar, he received a Master of Arts degree in 1954 and a Bachelor of Philosophy (Economics) degree in 1955. In 1955, he started teaching at the University of Toronto and became an assistant professor of economics in 1962.

In 1965, he became Chief Economist for the Government of Ontario Department of Economics and Development. He later became Deputy Treasurer in 1967, Deputy Minister of Treasury and Economics in 1968, and Deputy Treasurer and Deputy Minister of Economics and Intergovernmental Affairs in 1972. He was president of York University from 1974 to 1984. From 1984 to 1994, he was the Director of York International. From 1994 to 2003, he was the Chairman of the Board of Governors of the Commonwealth of Learning.

In 1977, he was made an Officer of the Order of Canada. In 1978, he was made a Knight of Grace of the Order of St. Lazarus of Jerusalem. He was awarded the 125th Anniversary of the Confederation of Canada Medal, the Queen Elizabeth II Silver Jubilee Medal, and the Canadian Centennial Medal.
