= Community economic development =

Community-government collaboration

Community economic development (CED) is a field of study that actively elicits community involvement when working with government and private sectors to build strong communities, industries, and markets. It includes collaborative and participatory involvement of community dwellers in every area of development that affects their standard of living.

Community economic development encourages using local resources in a way that enhances economic opportunities while improving social conditions in a sustainable way. It equally facilitates the effective exploration and utilization of local resources for optimal community advantages. Often CED initiatives are implemented to overcome crises and increase opportunities for communities who are disadvantaged. An aspect of "localizing economics," CED is a community-centered process that blends social and economic development to foster the economic, social, ecological, and cultural well-being of communities. For example, neighborhood business organizations target growth in specific commercial areas by lobbying government authorities for special tax rates and real estate developments.

Community economic development is an alternative to conventional economic development. Its central tenet is that "problems facing communities—unemployment, poverty, job loss, environmental degradation and loss of community control—need to be addressed in a holistic and participatory way."

== History ==
Economic development has existed even at a basic level since the earliest recorded communities. However, in the US and several other countries, the concept of community economic development emerged "in response to tenacious poverty and the need for affordable housing, good jobs, affordable health care and quality of life matters needed for human existence."

=== CED in the US ===
In the late 19th century, reformers discovered less-than-desirable areas of the country where communities were overcrowded, unhealthy, poor, and located near factories, docks, and other places of employment. In the early twentieth century during the Progressive Era, reformers began making connections between the condition of communities and "social ills" such as crime and poverty and proposing ways to improve upon them. The Progressive agenda of political, social, and physical reform swept the nation and led to comprehensive antipoverty strategies, embodied by New Deal programs and other grants in the 1930s. Policies during this time were top-down, and citizens affected by them had very little input into the changes being made. Once communities began to be revitalized, segregation policy followed to determine who was allowed to live where. Housing policy and real estate practices stifled upward mobility for non-whites, and their communities developed with unique characteristics and problems as a result. These actions shaped communities until the 1960s, when President LBJ signed into law many anti-discriminatory laws, such as the Civil Rights Act of 1964, and declared a war on poverty, which brought renewal and upward mobility for many people. More loan programs, grants, and fair housing policies were implemented throughout the 1960s and 1970s but still failed to be non-discriminatory on the basis of race in some cases thus shaping communities in a particular fashion. Social investment gained momentum once again in the 1980s and 1990s, bringing change to communities across America. Municipal governments become more representative of the communities they serve, and the public is more involved and can interact with bureaucracies and elected officials with greater ease. Many initiatives existed at this time to renew inner cities and rural areas while also tackling social issues such as eradicating drugs and improving education. The modern-day CED movement is focused on renewing urban and rural communities. Social justice is a key component to policy and conversation about changes to be made. Citizens are engaged with bureaucracies and their elected officials through a variety of mediums such as social media. Input from the people has gained more value due to increased demands for transparency.

=== CED around the world ===
In Nigeria CED is approached with a central focus on sustainability referred to as Sustainable Community Development. This concept combines economic, social and environmental practices and policies that promote sustainability for future generations. Much of this began in the 1980s, 2 decades after gaining independence, when the World Bank declared Nigeria eligible to receive funds from the International Development Association (IDA).

In Asia for the last 60 years the Asian Foundation has supported Asian initiatives to foster inclusive economic growth and broaden economic opportunities. The Foundation designs and implements economic programs in three core areas business environments for private sector growth, Entrepreneurship Development and Regional Economic Cooperation.

Economic development is not just limited to developing countries. Canada's provincial governments have been encouraging and funding municipal economic development efforts for decades.

== Theories and strategies ==
The most significant aspect of community economic development, aside from the fact that it focuses on economic development in specific localities, is that focuses on the process of community building. This “community” aspect of CED assumes that the community will play a dynamic role in economic development processes and that community development will contribute to sustained economic development and vice versa. In this understanding, the community is considered both an input and an output in CED.

Core to some approaches is community economic analysis, where factors affecting the community are analyzed to address economic needs and to pinpoint unfulfilled opportunities. Upon completion of the analysis the group decides what can and should be done to improve the economic conditions within the community, and then move to put the agreed-on economic goals and objectives into action.

From an economic viewpoint, the initial purpose of such a CED approach is the creation of local jobs and the stimulation of business activity. Integrally linked to these purposes are strategies to increase access to capital, stimulate asset building, improve the general business climate, and link citywide economic development efforts to specific community development efforts.

Increasing access to capital is an extremely important strategy for community economic development. Historically, residents in poor neighborhoods have experienced great difficulty finding access to capital because they are traditionally viewed as credit risks. In places where banks do offer services, these residents face other structural barriers such as minimum deposit requirements, high service fees, and complex paperwork. To solve these problems, a community economic development approach would develop alternate neighborhood community development financial institutions such as community development credit unions, community development banks, and community development venture capital funds.

Improving the general business climate is also integral to community economic development. Strategies to do so would include improving the infrastructure and physical appearance of commercial areas, the quality of quantity of residential housing, and the transportation systems in a neighborhood. While these may not directly effect economic activities, they serve to strengthen the economic well being of an area because it encourages businesses to locate there.

== Objectives and goals ==
Community economic development exists in all developed countries but varies in the way it functions with the different systems of governments around the world. Research makes it apparent that there are common goals and objectives such as economic activities and programs that develop low-income communities. Community Development Corporations, reformers and other agencies have other common initiatives including services to fight homelessness, lack of jobs, drug abuse, violence and crime as well as quality medical and childcare and home ownership opportunities while also bringing economic prosperity. Another increasingly common objective is to preserve the character of communities and strong support for local business.

Countries across the globe participate in reinvestment and development through a bank such as the Community Reinvestment Act, World Bank and the IDA amongst many others. Another commonality for nations international is need to incorporate sustainability and the natural environment into the growth of societies.

== See also ==
- List of community topics
- Community building
- Community development
- Community engagement
- Community Futures
- Community practice
- Community service
- Social economy
- Urban planning
