= Butsni, Khmelnytskyi Raion =

Village in Ukraine

Butsni Буцні
- Interactive map of Butsni
- Country: Ukraine
- Oblast: Khmelnytskyi
- Raion: Khmelnytskyi
- Hromada: Letychiv settlement hromada

Population (2021)
  - Total: 133

Butsni (Ukrainian: Буцні) is a village in Letychiv hromada (Летичівська селищна громада), Khmelnytskyi Raion, Khmelnytskyi Oblast, Ukraine. In the past it was known as Butsnevtsy (Polish: Bucniowce, Russian: Буцневцы / Буцнёвцы, Ukrainian: Буцніовци, Буцнівці), a small town in Poland, Russian Empire, Ukraine and early Soviet Union. It was devastated during World War II.

According to the 2021 Census, the population was 133.

== History ==
Bucniowce was a miasteczko in gmina Wójtowce, powiat latyczowski (later Letichevsky Uyezd, Podolian Governorate, Russian Empire), by the Zhar River. In 1880 it had population of 580, including 16 persons of odnodvortsy (petty szlachta deprived of nobility in Russian Empire after the Partitions of Poland) and 90 Jews. According to the 1897 Russian census, its population was 1265, of which 304 were Jews.

=== Jewish history ===
In Yiddish, it was called Butsnevits, and the search of this shtetl was the subject of Jack Rothman's book Searching for Butsnevits: A Shtetl Tale (2016) - the place where his ancestors lived.

The fate of the Jews of Butsnevtsy is discussed, along with other Jewish communities of Letichev district, in the two-volume set by David A. Chapin and Ben Weinstock, The Road from Letichev

The neglected old Jewish cemetery is located in the wood nearby (49.29613°N 27.75460°E) and is used for cattle grazing. Found tombstones date in the range from 1749 to 1871.
