= Social action model =

The social action model is a theory of social work practice. The social action model is a key to sociopolitical empowerment for work with oppressed groups, communities, and organizations. The model strives to reallocate sociopolitical power so that disenfranchised citizens can access the opportunities and resources of society and, in turn, find meaningful ways to contribute to society as valued human beings.

The model guides social workers on how to take action by using empowerment-based practice, collaboration and partnership, alliances, and development and action plans. The model can also be used within the context of an ecosystems perspective.
