= List of American elected officials who are social workers =

This is a list of current and former elected officials in the United States who are social workers by education/training in an accredited social work program.

The list includes members of either the legislative, executive, or judicial branches of the United States federal government, as well as any elected official of state and local governments.

== Federal government ==
=== Executive ===
There has never been a social worker president or vice president of the United States.

=== Legislative ===
Current

- Sylvia Garcia
- Hillary Scholten

Former

- Debbie Stabenow
- Karen Bass
- Susan A. Davis
- Luis V. Gutierrez
- Barbara Lee
- Carol Shea-Porter
- Kyrsten Sinema
- Niki Tsongas

== State/local ==
Name	State	Party	Position	Area or district	Type of social work degree
Andi Story	AK	Democratic	State legislator	District 34	MSW
Katie Hobbs	AZ	Democratic	Governor	Arizona (statewide)	BSW, MSW
Nikki Perez	CA		Mayor	Burbank	MSW
Sofya Bagdasaryan	CA		School board member	Simi Valley	MSW, PhD
Karen Bass	CA	Democratic	Mayor	Los Angeles	MSW
Maria E. Cruz	CA		School board member	Covina Valley	LCSW
Susan Eggman	CA	Democratic	State legislator	District 13	MSW, PhD
Martha Guerrero	CA	Democratic	Mayor		MSW
Corey Jackson	CA	Democratic	State legislator	District 60	MSW, DSW
Barbara Lee	CA	Democratic	Mayor	Oakland	MSW
Vanessa Marrero	CA		City council member	District 13	MSW
Caroline Menjivar	CA	Democratic	State legislator	District 20	MSW
Walter Muneton	CA		School board member	District 47	LCSW
Rose Munoz	CA		School board member	Santa Barbara	MSW
Graciela Ortiz	CA		City council member		MSW
Tony Thurmond	CA	Democratic	Superintendent of Public Instruction	California (statewide)	MSW, MLSP
Veronica Vasquez	CA	Democratic	Mayor	Delano	MSW
Kimberly Warmsley	CA		City council member	Stockton, District 6	MSW
Jackie Wong	CA		School board member	West Sacramento	MSW
Tracy Kraft-Tharp	CO	Democratic	State legislator	District 29	MSW
Lisa Smith	CO	Democratic	City council member	Arvada	MSW
Emily Sirota	CO	Democratic	State legislator	District 9	MSW
Ceci Maher	CT	Democratic	State senator	Darien, New Canaan, Redding, Ridgefield, Stamford, Weston, Westport & Wilton	MSW
Kai Belton	CT	Democratic	State representative	Middletown	MSW
Toni Walker	CT	Democratic	State legislator	District 93	BSW, MSW
Jillian Gilchrest	CT	Democratic	State legislator	District 18	MSW
Anne Meiman Hughes	CT	Democratic	State legislator	District 135	MSW
Rick Lopes	CT	Democratic	State legislator	District 6	MSW
Cristin McCarthy-Vahey	CT	Democratic	State legislator	District 133	MSW
Nnamdi Chukwuocha	DE	Democratic	State legislator	District 1	MSW
Marie Pinkney	DE	Democratic	State legislator		MSW
Marlene Saunders	DE		Mayor	Bridgeville	DSW, LMSW, MSW
Steve Kornell	FL	Democratic	City council member	District 5	MSW
John Legg	FL	Reform	State legislator	District 46	BSW
Mitch Rosenwald	FL	Democratic	Mayor	Oakland Park	PhD, LCSW
Diane Scott	FL		School board member	District 1	MSW, DSW
Shelly Hutchinson	GA	Democratic	State legislator	District 107	MSW
Evelyn Winn Dixon	GA	Democratic	Mayor	Riverdale	MSW
Haunani Apoliona	HI	Independent	County council member		MSW
Ryan Yamane	HI	Democratic	State legislator	District 37	MSW
James Anderson	IA	Democratic	Human Rights Commission chair		MSW
Bradley Cavanagh	IA		Mayor	Dubuque	BSW, MSW
Joni Dittmer	IA	Republican	School board member	North Scott	MSW
Nancy Z. Fett	IA		School board member	District 4	MSW
Joel Fry	IA	Republican	State legislator	District 95	MSW
Kelli Soyer	IA		School board member		MSW
Susan Kosche Vallem	IA		City council member	Waverly	MSW
Ross Wilburn	IA	Democratic	State legislator	District 46	BASW, MSW
Angenie McCleary	ID	Democratic	County commissioner	Blaine County	MSW
Pamella Bess-Tabb	IL		School board member	Galesburg District 205	MSW, LSW
Martha Deuter	IL	Democratic	State legislator	District 45	MSW
Lorraine Guerrero	IL	Democratic	School board member	Joliet District 204	LCSW
Jackie Haas	IL	Republican	State legislator	District 79	MSW
Lindsey LaPointe	IL	Democratic	State legislator	District 19	MSW
Karina Villa	IL	Democratic	State legislator	District 25	MSW
Oliver Davis	IN	Democratic	City council member	At-large	BSW, MSW, DSW, LCSW, LICSW
Carole Cadue Blackwood	KS		School board member	Lawrence	LMSW
Kelly Jones	KS		School board member	Lawrence	LMSW
Heather Meyer	KS	Democratic	State legislator	District 29	
Susan Ruiz	KS	Democratic	State legislator	District 23	LICSW
Lindsey Burke	KY	Democratic	State legislator	District 75	MSW
Lamin Swann	KY	Democratic	State legislator	District 93	BSW
Joseph Bouie Jr.	LA	Democratic	State legislator	District 97	MSW
Ranord J. Darensburg	LA	Democratic	Judge	Statewide	MSW
Carolyn Hill	LA	Democratic	School board member		MSW
LaVonya Malveaux	LA	Democratic	Mayor	Village of Palmetto	BSW
Jo Comerford	MA	Democratic	State legislator	Northampton, Greenfield	MSW
Brandy Fluker Oakley	MA	Democratic	State legislator	12th Suffolk	BSW
Katrina Huff-Lamond	MA	Democratic	City council member	Randolph	MSW
Denise Hurst	MA	Democratic	School board member	Springfield	MSW
Khrystian King	MA	Democratic	City council member	Worcester	MSW
Sheila Lyons	MA	Democratic	County commissioner	Barnstable County	MSW
Marc McGovern	MA	Democratic	Mayor	Cambridge	MSW
Irwin Nesoff	MA		School board member	Hull	DSW
Brenda Noel	MA	Democratic	City council member	District 6	MSW
Sarah Phillips	MA		School board member	District 3	MSW
Sarai Rivera	MA	Democratic	City council member	District 4	MSW
Sara Rodrigues	MA		School board member	Fall River	LICSW
Barry Sanders	MA	Democratic	City council member	Taunton	LICSW
Karen Spilka	MA	Democratic	State legislator	District 2	BSW
Ayesha Wilson	MA	Democratic	School board member	Cambridge	BSW, MSW
Melony G. Griffith	MD	Democratic	State legislator	District 25	MSW
Shireka McCarthy	MD		City council member	Seat Pleasant	BSW, MSW, LGSW
Joanne Waszczak	MD		City council member	Hyattsville	MSW
Jamila Woods	MD	Democratic	State legislator	District 26	MSW
Michael Brennan	ME	Democratic	City council member	District 36	BSW, MSW
Lydia Crafts	ME	Democratic	State legislator	District 130	MSW
Lori Gramlich	ME	Democratic	State legislator	District 131	MSW
Charlie Cavell	MI	Democratic	County commissioner	Pontiac	MSW
Stephanie Chang	MI	Democratic	State legislator	District 1	MSW
Betsey Coffia	MI	Democratic	State legislator	District 14	BSW
Ayesha Ghazi Edwin	MI	Democratic	City council member	Ann Arbor	MSW
Justin Hodge	MI	Democratic	County commissioner	District 5	LMSW, MSW
Ruth Johnson	MI	Republican	State legislator	District 14	MSW
Faith Redwine-Otieno	MI	Democratic	County commissioner	Washtenaw County	LBSW
Carrie Rheingans	MI	Democratic	State legislator	District 47	MSW
Hillary Scholten	MI	Democratic	U.S. representative	Michigan’s 3rd congressional district	BSW
Rochelle Vrsek	MI	Democratic	City council member	Webster Township	LMSW
Jennifer Arneson	MN		School board member	District 1	MSW
Angela Conley	MN		County commissioner	District 4	BSW
Heather Edelson	MN	Democratic	State legislator	District 49A	MSW
Mary Granlund	MN		School board member	Columbia Heights	MSW
Jessica Hanson	MN	Democratic	State legislator	District 56A	BSW
Hodan Hassan	MN	Democratic	State legislator	District 62A	BSW, MSW
Emily Larson	MN	Democratic	Mayor	Duluth	MSW
Rafael Ortega	MN	Democratic	County commissioner	District 5	BSW, MSW
Rhonda Pownell	MN		City council member	Northfield	BSW
Emelie Rivera	MN		City council member	Bemidji	MSW
Paul Schnell	MN		Commissioner of corrections		BSW
Aaron Crossley	MO	Democratic	State legislator	District 29	LMSW
Keri Ingle	MO	Democratic	State legislator	District 35	LMSW
Crystal Quade	MO	Democratic	State legislator	District 132	BSW
Sydney Batch	NC	Democratic	State legislator	District 17	MSW
Alan Beck	NC		School board member	Davidson County	BSW
Monique Holsey-Hyman	NC		City council member	Durham (at-large)	
Graig R. Meyer	NC	Democratic	State legislator	District 23	MSW
Paige Sayles	NC		School board member	Franklin County	MSW
Summer Woodside	NC		School board member	Scotland County	MSW
Gretchen Dobervich	ND	Democratic	State legislator	District 11	LBSW
Tim Mathern	ND	Democratic	State legislator	District 11	MSW
Jim McKay	NH	Democratic	State legislator	Merrimack 18	MSW
Charles McMahon	NH	Republican	State legislator	Rockingham 17	BSW
Eileen Cusack	NJ	Democratic	City council member	Atlantic Highlands	MSW
Emily Jabbour	NJ	Democratic	City council member	Hoboken	MSW
Teresa Kelly	NJ	Democratic	Mayor	Buena Vista Township	MSW
Maria Rondinaro	NJ	Democratic	City council member	Belmar	MSW
Doreen Gallegos	NM	Democratic	State legislator	District 52	MSW
Jerry Ortiz y Pino	NM	Democratic	State legislator	District 12	MSW
Teresa Benitez-Thompson	NV	Democratic	State legislator	District 27	MSW
Carolyn Edwards	NV	Independent	School board member	Clark County	MSW
David Humke	NV	Republican	County commissioner	Washoe County	MSW
Annie Wilson	NV	Independent	School board member	District 2	MSW
Barrington R. Atkins	NY	Democratic	County legislator	District 10	LMSW
Bonnie Berman	NY		Library board member	At-large	MSW
Julia Burgos	NY		School board member	District 5	MSW
Steven Cymbrowitz	NY	Democratic	State legislator	District 45	MSW
Carol Eason	NY		School board member	At-large	LMSW
James J. Foley	NY	Republican	County legislator	District 17	LCSW-R
Mathylde Frontus	NY	Democratic	State legislator	District 46	BSW, LMSW, PhD
Jody Geist	NY		Library board member	At-large	MSW
Sharon M. J. Gianelli	NY	Democratic	Judge	District 10	MSW
Hilary Gingold	NY	Democratic	Judge	At-large	BSW
Helene Gugerty	NY	Democratic	County legislator	At-large	BSW
Kara Hahn	NY	Democratic	County legislator	District 5	MSW
Nicole Henderson	NY		School board member	At-large	MSW
Simone Holder-Daniel	NY	Democratic	School board member	District 2	MSW
Chantel Jackson	NY	Democratic	State legislator	District 79	MSW
Hope Jay	NY		School board member	North seat	MSW
Mary Kuhn	NY	Democratic	County legislator	District 7	MSW
Debra Mule	NY	Democratic	State legislator	District 5	MSW
Lori-Ann Novello	NY		Library board member	At-large	MSW
Susan Parker	NY	Democratic	County legislator	District 4	MSW
Yversha M. Roman	NY	Democratic	County legislator	District 26	BSW
Arlene Soete	NY		School board member	At-large	BSW, MSW
Lourdes M. Ventura	NY	Democratic	Judge	At-large	MSW
Betty J. Williams	NY	Democratic	Judge	District 2	MSW
Jaime R. Williams	NY	Democratic	State legislator	District 59	BSW, MSW
Diane Y. Wray	NY	Democratic	Judge	At-large	MSW
Patricia Britt	OH	Democratic	City council member	District 6	BSW
Karina Guzman Ortiz	OR		School board member	Salem–Keizer	MSW
Tawna Sanchez	OR	Democratic	State legislator	District 43	MSW
Eileen Hartnett Albillar	PA		Clerk of courts	Bucks County	MSW
William Amesbury	PA	Democratic	Judge		MSW
John Blake	PA	Democratic	State legislator	District 22	MSW
Kevin Caridad	PA	Republican	County council member		DSW
Charles Marcinko	PA		School board member	Region 1	MSW
Diane Ellis-Marsegila	PA	Democratic	County commissioner		MSW
Sarah Graden	PA		County council member		MSW
Justin Rolas	RI	Democratic	City council member	Providence	MSW
Gilda Cobb-Hunter	SC	Democratic	State legislator	District 66	MSW
Aftyn Behn	TN	Democratic	State legislator	District 51	LMSW
Carol B. Berz	TN		City council member	District 6	MSW
Stefanie Dalton	TN		City council member	Red Bank	LMSW
Joe Pitts	TN	Democratic	Mayor		BSW
Sylvia Garcia	TX	Democratic	U.S. representative	Texas’s 29th congressional district	BSW
Elliott Naishtat	TX	Democratic	State legislator	District 49	MSW
Jessica Ortega-Ochoa	TX		City council member	District 1	MSSW
Francis D. Gibson	UT	Republican	State legislator	District 65	MSW
Sandra Hollins	UT	Democratic	State legislator	District 23	MSW
Elizabeth Guzmán	VA	Democratic	State legislator	District 31	MSW
Kathy Tran	VA	Democratic	State legislator	District 42	MSW
Brian Cina	VT	Democratic	State legislator	Chittenden 6-4	MSW
Barbara Rachelson	VT	Democratic	State legislator	Chittenden 6-6	MSW
Tanya Vyhovsky	VT	Democratic	State legislator	Chittenden Central	MSW, LICSW
Tam Dinh	WA		School board member	Mercer Island	BSW, MSW
Katie Favela	WA		City council member	Ridgefield	LICSW
Tina Orwall	WA	Democratic	State legislator	District 33	MSW
Alicia Rule	WA	Democratic	State legislator	District 42	MSW
Kate Beaton	WI		City council member	At-large	BSW
Don Mowry	WI		County commissioner	Eau Claire County	DSW
Jeanne Nutter	WI		County commissioner	Trempealeau County	MSW
Nick Smiar	WI	Democratic	County commissioner	Eau Claire County	PhD
John Tate II	WI		City council member	Racine District 3	MSW
Floyd Esquibel	WY	Democratic	State legislator	District 44	BSW, MSW
Jerry Iekel	WY	Republican	State legislator	District 29	BSW, MSW
