= Community practice =

Community practice, also known as mezzo social work, is a branch of social work that focuses on larger social systems and social change, and is tied to the history of social work. The field of community practice social work encompasses community organizing and community organization, community building, social planning, human service management, community development, policy analysis, policy advocacy, mediation, electronic advocacy and other larger systems interventions.

In the UK the term is often used for community work or health visitors.

Although community practice has overlap with many other applied social science disciplines, such as urban planning, economic development, public affairs, rural sociology and nonprofit management, its roots go back as far as the 1890s. Community practice social workers typically have a Master of Social Work degree (MSW). There are several MSW programs in the United States that offer community practice concentrations, while others offer specializations in one or several types of community practice, such as social services administration or policy analysis. The professional group of community practitioners in the US is the Association for Community Organization and Social Administration (ACOSA), which publishes The Journal of Community Practice.

== Theoretical models ==
Due to community work's applied nature, theory is not always considered necessary or even utilized. Despite this, there are number of theoretical models of community practice that guide the practitioner toward social action. These theoretical models have evolved from proto-models utilized in the Progressive Era to the present day. Synthesized from the work of Jane Addams, Bessie McClanehan, Robert P. Lane, Murray Ross, Jack Rothman, Sam Taylor, and Robert Roberts, community workers Marie Weil and Dorothy Gamble have crafted eight theoretical models of community practice as:

1. Neighborhood and community organizing
2. Organizing functional communities
3. Social, economic, and sustainable development
4. Inclusive program development
5. Social planning
6. Coalitions
7. Political and social action
8. Movements for progressive change

In any of these models, the theoretical outcomes, or goals, are as follows:

Neighborhood and Community Organizing	Organizing Functional Communities	Social, Economic, and Sustainable Development	Inclusive Program Development	Social Planning	Coalitions	Political and Social Action	Movements for Progressive Change
Direct capacity of people to organize; direct/moderate impacts of outside development	Action for social justice focus on providing a service and simultaneously changing attitudes	Promote grassroots plans that incorporate economic growth without harming resources; open new opportunities	Expansion or redirection of programs to improve service and become more participatory	Actions and proposals for action by neighborhoods, planning councils, or elected bodies	Grassroots effort amongst populace to influence program directions; made through partnerships	Action for social change focused toward changing policies	Action that provides new paradigms for healthy development of individuals and the Earth

== Versus micro practice ==
Historically, social work practice has been divided between two different categories: micro practice and macro practice. Although there is often an overlap in skills between the two areas, micro-practitioners generally focus on working with individuals whereas macro-practitioners generally work on creating change in larger social, political or community systems. Macro-social work professions that typically engage in community practice methods include: community organizers, political organizers, fundraisers, program managers, and community educators. A third social work practice category is sometimes referenced called 'mezzo practice'. Mezzo practice can be defined by its combination of micro and macro aspects with the focus of interventions being smaller groups or systems. Whereas macro practice often focuses on policy or systematic changes, some researchers and practitioners consider mezzo practice to focus more on change at the community or neighborhood level. Because there is often an overlap between macro and mezzo, some argue mezzo practice to be a sub-category within macro social work. Although it makes up a smaller portion of social work practice, mezzo practice represents an effective way to bridge some of the perceived distances between micro and macro practice methods.

== Non-traditional settings ==
Traditionally social work practice is located within office or agency settings. Community practice may also utilize alternative spaces. Emerging from the tradition of settlement houses of the 19th century, the use of existing spaces for services provided by social work and community organizing truly makes the services community based. Nontraditional settings are public spaces, often part of the service industry where community members gather socially. These spaces must be rooted in the cultural heritage of the community. The spaces should also be unique to the community and already heavily utilized for gathering. The primary role of nontraditional spaces is not to provide social work services, though they can be utilized for such services. These spaces are venues for outreach, where social work services use existing gathering spaces to bring services to the community to provide additional resources to more individuals.

The goal of using existing gathering spaces as a venue for social work is to build on the existing structures of a community. Communities offer numerous characteristics that can be built upon for services and organizing. Furthermore, by organizing around an existing collective identity or shared experience there is a building block for group cohesion and may increase effectiveness of organizing. Effectively navigating entry into these spaces may take time and diligence on behalf of the organizer. Once in these spaces, it is important to honor and build upon existing leadership.

Nontraditional settings provide cultural access as well as access to multiple generations. These spaces are often seen as a bridge point where multiple generations gather and where cultural values and traditions are learned or passed on. In many instances these spaces are inclusive of non-English speaking members of the community.

== Limitations ==
Macro-social workers and those engaging in community practice methods may encounter a number of limitations that will make their work in the community more challenging.

Since macro-community practice is an ongoing and relatively time intensive process, the consequences can be felt throughout the community and by the organizer(s) when projects or efforts are perceived to fail. The community may reject or distrust the individuals or organizations involved with leading the organizing efforts, creating obstacles for future involvement in the community. Likewise, community organizers and organizations may burnout due to distress and chronic exposure to clients just as in micro-social work. Macro-social workers may specifically burn out on community practice due to unsuccessful efforts or unique constraints of the community, shifting them from macro to micro based work.

Currently, social workers engaging in community practice work comprise a minority within the larger social work profession. As of 2010, less than 20% of students in Master of Social Work programs in the United States have a macro-practice related concentration. Those concentrations include: community organizing, community planning, social policy and program evaluation. This compares to 56% of students who concentrate in direct practice and clinical social work. Because macro-social work is pursued less within the field, macro-social workers can feel under-prepared by their education, unrepresented, and not supported.

=== US Master of Social Work students' concentration areas as of 2010 ===
Here is a breakdown of concentration areas for Master of Social Work students as of 2010.

Concentration Area	Rounded Percentages
Direct practice/clinical	156%
Advanced generalist	100%
Combination of direct practice/clinical and community planning or management/administration	3%
Combination of community planning and management/ administration	3%
Community planning/organization	12%
Management or administration	20%
Combination of direct practice/clinical and social policy or program evaluation	29%
Social policy	10%
Program evaluation	100%
Combination of social policy and program evaluation	1%
Other Concentration Areas	8%

== See also ==
- List of community topics
- Community economic development
- Community service
- Community engagement
