= Community mobilization =

Method of practicing sustainable development

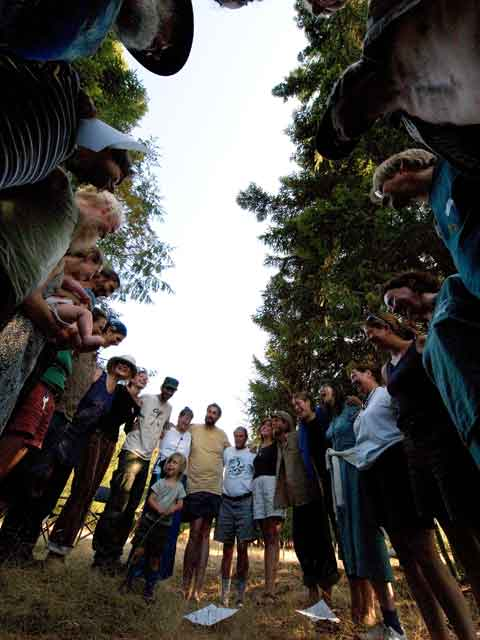
Participants in Diana Leafe Christian's "Heart of a Healthy Community" seminar circle during an afternoon session at the environmental charity O.U.R. Ecovillage.

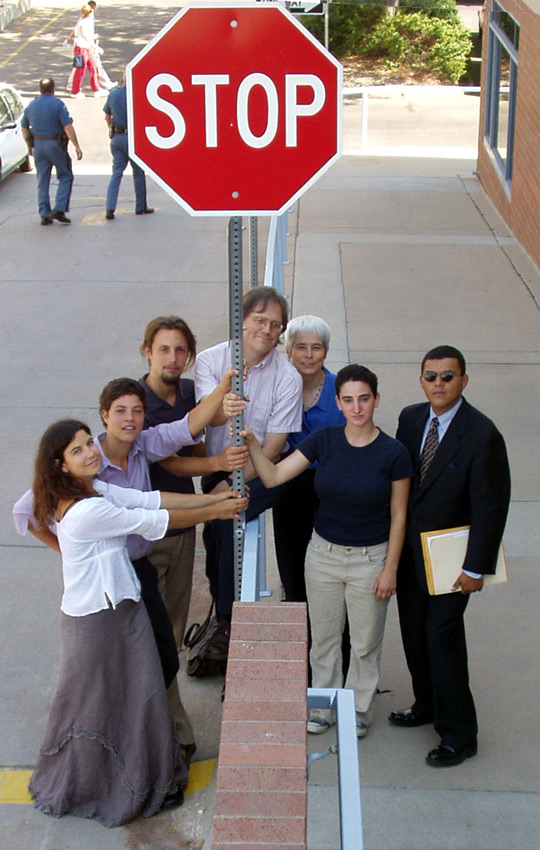
Members of the Collateral Damage Affinity Group gathered around a stop sign

Community mobilization is an attempt to bring human and non-human resources together to undertake developmental activities and achieve sustainable development.

== Process ==
Community mobilization is a process through which action is stimulated by a community itself, or by others, that is planned, carried out, and evaluated by a community's individuals, groups, and organizations on a participatory and sustained basis to improve the health, hygiene and education levels so as to enhance the overall standard of living in the community. A group of people have transcended their differences to meet on equal terms in order to facilitate a participatory decision-making process. In other words, it can be viewed as a process which begins a dialogue among members of the community to determine who, what, and how issues are decided, and also to provide an avenue for everyone to participate in decisions that affect their lives.

== Requirements ==
Community mobilization needs many analytical and supportive resources which are internal (inside the community) and external (outside the community) as well. Resources include:

- Leadership
- Organizational capacity
- Communications channels
- Assessments
- Problem solving
- Resource mobilization
- Administrative and operational management

== Strategies ==
Advocates for Youth envisions that strong healthcare initiatives will be readily owned by a community if the leaders ("grass tops"), the citizens ("grass roots"), and youth are fully engaged in mobilizing the community, educating stakeholders, and implementing evidence-based interventions. To this respect, 14 strategies guided by best practice have been reported (Huberman 2014):

1. Secure strong leadership

2. Establish a formal structure

3. Engage diverse organizations, community leaders, and residents

4. Ensure authentic participation and shared decision making

5.ensure authentic and productive roles for young people

6. Develop a shared vision

7. Conduct a needs assessment

8. Create a strategic plan

9. Implement mutually reinforcing strategies

10. Create a fundraising strategy

11. Establish effective channels for internal communication

12. Educate the community

13. Conduct process and outcome evaluations

14. Evaluate the community mobilization effort separately

== Implications ==
"Community mobilization" is a frequently used term in developmental sector. Recently, community mobilization has been a valuable and effective concept which has various implications in dealing with basic problems like health and hygiene, population, pollution and gender bias.

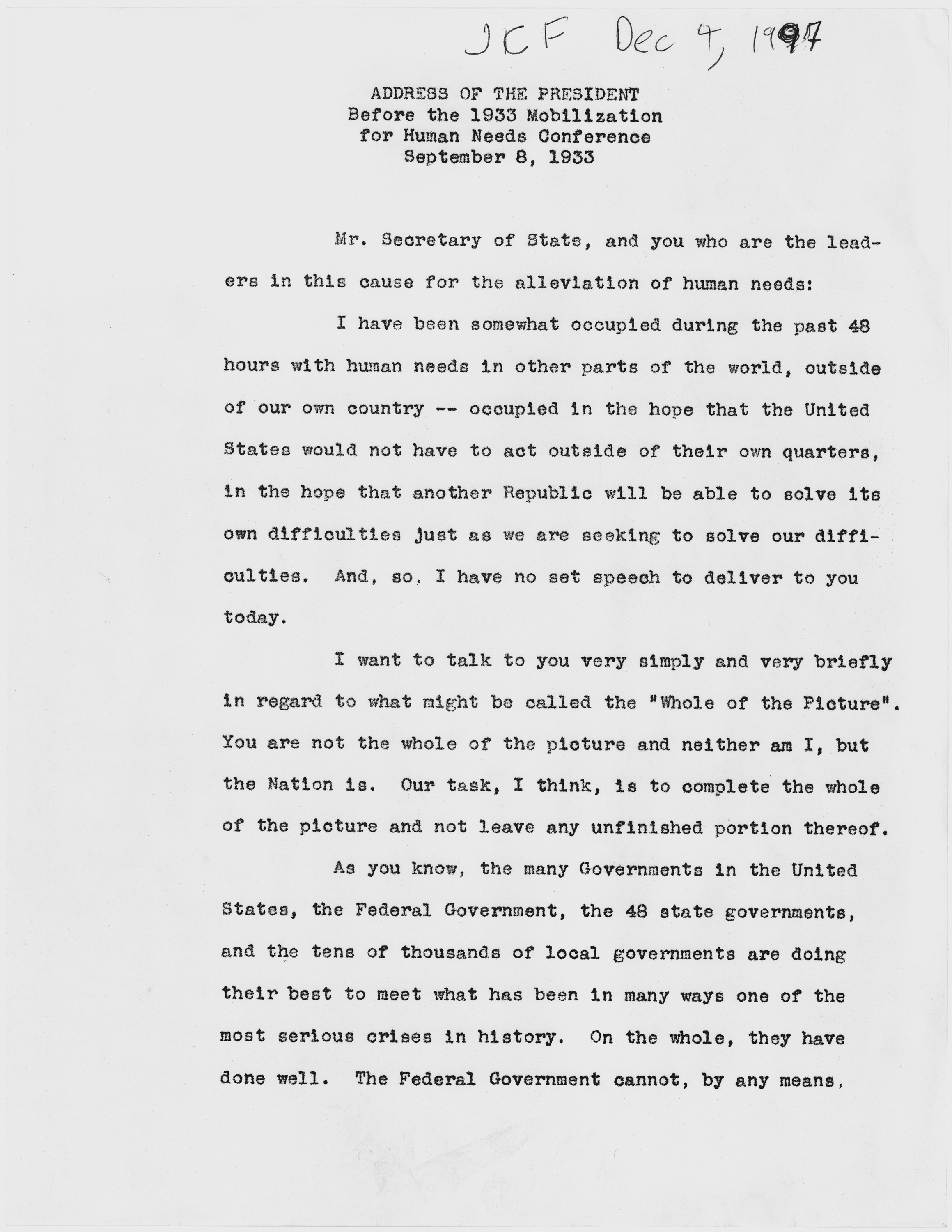
1933 Mobilization for Human Needs Conference
