= Jack Rothman =

American sociologist and social worker (born 1927)

- Occupation: Sociologist

Jack Rothman (born 1927) is an American sociologist and social worker. He is best known for his work in community organizing within the field of social work. He has authored some 25 books and monographs and lectured extensively on social problems and social change. His core interests include poverty, inequality, racism and multicultural relations, mental health, and community participation.

Professor Rothman is recognized nationally and internationally for “Three Models of Community Organization Practice,” a leading conceptualization of community intervention. This formulation was designated a “Classic Text” by the Journal of Community Development, an Oxford University Press publication. His research and theoretical work have made major conceptual contributions to the field of community organization.

== Early life and education ==
Jack Rothman was born in 1927 in the State of New York. He, as well as his older sister, are the offspring of Jewish immigrants from Eastern Europe.

Rothman served as a Pharmacist Mate in the U.S. Navy during World War II and under assignment as a Fleet Marine was stationed with the Marine guard at Camp David, which was called Shangri-La at the time. After the war, he obtained his bachelor's degree from City College of New York.

From there, he moved on to acquire a Master's in Social Work degree from the Ohio State University in 1951. Afterwards he returned to New York and gained social work community-based practice experience with neighborhood centers, the New York City Youth Board, and B'nai B'rith Youth Organization. A major project at the Youth Board involved action to curtail the blockbusting tactics of real estate agents in racially changing neighborhoods. In 1960 he earned a PhD from Columbia University, with an emphasis on social psychology. In keeping with his dual interests, Rothman has been a lifetime member of both the American Sociological Association and the National Association of Social Workers.

== Career in academia ==
Professor Rothman's research has centered on community and organizational analysis, including the designing of change in communities and social institutions.

In the early 1960s, Rothman joined Professor Meyer Schwartz at the University of Pittsburgh to implement the first contemporary two-year social work concentration in community organization.

In 1962, Dr. Rothman joined the faculty at the University of Michigan in Ann Arbor. He, along with his U of M colleagues, designed the most comprehensive community organization curriculum and through his writings influenced the profession to accept social action and political advocacy as a legitimate practice in social work.

During his tenure at Michigan, Dr. Rothman co-authored "Strategies of Community Intervention", originally published in 1974, which is currently in its 7th edition and is the longest standing text in community organization—and possibly in social work generally.

An ardent early opponent of the Vietnam War, Rothman was among the group of Michigan faculty members who in February and March 1965 conceived of and implemented the first ever Teach-in against the war.

In 1984, Rothman left Michigan to take a position at the University of California, Los Angeles. He currently holds the title of Professor Emeritus at the Luskin School of Public Affairs within UCLA.

In 2012, Rothman conducted a survey of the membership of ACOSA (Association for Community Organization and Social Administration), which documented limitations in support for the macro area (community organizing, policy practice, and management of organizations) in the social work field. Subsequently, there was appointed a Special Commission on Macro Practice, with the aim of expanding and strengthening the social intervention arm of the social work profession nationally.

=== Research ===
Rothman's early work at the University of Michigan involved an extensive research utilization effort geared to developing an empirical knowledge base for community intervention. His 1974 book, "Planning and Organizing for Social Change: Action Principles from Social Science Research" was based on the retrieval of over 900 empirical studies from multiple disciplines and their synthesis into several hundred generalizations and action guidelines for practitioners and change agents. For this project he developed a unique methodology of qualitative meta-analysis - termed Systematic Research Synthesis, which he has used in a series of subsequent studies.

Rothman employed other methods for bridging research and social intervention. He developed a Social R&D paradigm that parallels the process used in the physical sciences and industry (Social R&D: Research and Development in the Human Services). A form of intervention research, it offers a systematic means for creating tested and user-ready tools for social innovation—for example, means of creating innovative social programs or fostering citizen participation. This work came into being prior to the emergence of evidence-based practice that has influenced academic research in social work and other professions in recent years. See the references for an overview of Rothman’s extensive research studies.

=== Books ===
- A New Look at Field Instruction: Education for Application of Practice Skills in Community Organization and Social Planning; Rothman, Jack Jones, Wyatt C.; Publisher: Association Press; 1971. ISBN 9780809618118
- Promoting Social Justice in the Multigroup Society; A Casebook for Group Relations Practitioners; Jack Rothman; Publisher: Association Press; 1971. ISBN 9780809618040
- Planning and Organizing for Social Change: Action Principles from Social Science Research; Jack Rothman; Publisher: Columbia University Press; 1974. ISBN 9780231083355
- Promoting Innovation and Change in Organizations and Communities: A Planning Manual; Jack Rothman; John Erlich, Joseph G. Teresa; Publisher: Wiley; 1975. ISBN 0471739677
- Fostering Participation and Promoting Innovation: Handbook for Human Service Professionals; Jack Rothman, Joseph G. Teresa, John Erlich; Publisher: F.E. Peacock; 1978. ISBN 9780875812458
- Social R & D: Research and Development in the Human Services; Jack Rothman; Publisher: Prentice-Hall; 1980. ISBN 9780138181123
- Using Research in Organizations: A Guide to Successful Application; Jack Rothman; Publisher: Published by Sage in cooperation with the National Institute of Social Work, London, and the Center for Research on the Utilization of Scientific Knowledge, University of Michigan, 1980. ISBN 9780803914421
- Changing Organizations and Community Programs; Jack Rothman, John Erlich, Joseph G. Teresa; Publisher: Sage Publications; 1983. 9780803916180 Edition
- Marketing Human Service Innovations; Jack Rothman; Publisher: Sage Publications; 1983. ISBN 9780803919655
- Runaway & Homeless Youth: Strengthening Services to Families and Children; Jack Rothman; Publisher: Longman; 1991. ISBN 9780801305399
- Guidelines for Case Management: Putting Research to Professional Use; Jack Rothman; Publisher: F.E. Peacock Publishers; 1992. ISBN 9780875813622 DDC: 361.3/2 LCC: HV40
- Intervention Research: Design and Development for Human Services; Jack Rothman; Publisher: Haworth Press; 1994. ISBN 9781560244202
- Practice with Highly Vulnerable Clients: Case Management and Community-Based Service; Jack Rothman; Publisher: Prentice Hall; 1994. ISBN 9780131190580
- Case Management: Integrating Individual and Community Practice; Jack Rothman, Jon Simon Sager; Publisher: Allyn and Bacon; 1998. ISBN 9780205265688 DDC 361.3/2/0973 LCC: HV687.5 Edition: (alk. paper)
- Reflections on Community Organization: Enduring Themes and Critical Issues; Jack Rothman; Publisher: F.E. Peacock; 1999. ISBN 9780875814162
- Tactics & Techniques of Community Intervention; 4th Edition; John Tropman, John E. Erlich, Jack Rothman; Publisher: F.E. Peacock Publishers; 2001. ISBN 9780875814353 DDC:
- Strategies Of Community Intervention; 7th Edition; Jack Rothman; John Erlich, John E. Tropman; Publisher: Eddie Bowers Publishing Company; 2008. ISBN 9781578790715
- Searching for Butsnevits: A Shtetl Tale, 2016

=== Awards and recognition ===
- 2015 Significant Lifetime Achievement in Social Work Education Award, Council on Social Work Education
- 2010 Distinguished Career Award, Ohio State University, College of Social Work.
- NASW Social Work Pioneer, National Association of Social Workers.
- Biography in the “Historical Dictionary of Community Organization”.
- 1980 Gunner Myrdai Award for Human Services, presented by The Evaluation Research Society.
- 1992 Outstanding Lifetime Achievement in Community Organization, presented by the Association of Community Organization and Social Administration (ACOSA).
- Two Fulbright Senior Research Fellowships, one in Great Britain and one in Israel.
- Harry Lurie Fellowship.

== Personal life ==
Rothman is a proponent of social activism and is a supporter of progressive causes, including the Workmen’s Circle and the Democratic Socialists of America. He has written political opinion pieces for a variety of print and electronic media, including The Nation, Social Policy, The Humanist, The Los Angeles Times, and the Huffington Post.

Living in Los Angeles heightened Rothman’s lifelong passion for movies and inspired him to learn more about the film-making industry. This interest culminated with him researching and writing "Hollywood in Wide Angle", published in 2004. The book offers a glance into the film-making process and its sociological implications through interviews with over 30 Hollywood directors.

Rothman has been quoted as saying, “Humor has always been a core part of my makeup”.

Jack decided to give stand-up comedy a try for himself after retiring from being a full-time professor. He started by enrolling in amateur comedy classes and then performed off-hours at clubs around Los Angeles such as the Comedy Store, The Improv in Hollywood, and the Ice House in Pasadena.
