= Murray G. Ross =

Canadian academic (1910–2000)

Murray G. Ross O.C., O.Ont.

President of York University
- In office 1959–1970
- Succeeded by: David W. Slater

Personal details
- Born: Murray George Ross; April 12, 1910 Sydney, Nova Scotia
- Died: July 20, 2000 (aged 90)
- Education: Acadia University, University of Toronto

Murray George Ross, OC OOnt (April 12, 1910 – July 20, 2000) was a Canadian sociologist, author, and academic administrator. He was the founding president of Toronto's York University and served in that role from 1959 to 1970.

Born in Sydney, Nova Scotia, the son of James Alway Ross and Sarah Agnes Kay, Ross received a Bachelor of Arts degree in economics and sociology from Acadia University in 1936. He received a Master of Arts degree in sociology from the University of Toronto in 1938. He did post-graduate work in sociology at the University of Chicago in 1939 and in Social psychology from Columbia University in 1949. He received a LL.D. from the University of Toronto in 1971.

In 1951, Ross was appointed an associate professor of Social Work at the University of Toronto. He became a professor in 1955. From 1956 to 1957, he was an Executive Assistant to the President and was a vice-president from 1957 to 1959. In 1959, he was appointed President of York University and served until 1970 when he became a professor of Social Science. He retired in 1972.

== Honours ==
In 1979, he was made an Officer of the Order of Canada "in recognition of his innovative leadership in the field of higher education". He was awarded the Order of Ontario in 1988. He was awarded the Canadian Centennial Medal and the 125th Anniversary of the Confederation of Canada Medal. The Murray Ross Parkway, the Ross Building, and the Murray G. Ross (Valedictorian) Award at York University are named after him.

== Selected works ==
- Religious Beliefs of Youth: A Study and Analysis of the Structure and Function of the Religious Beliefs of Young Adults, Based on a Questionnaire Sample of 1,935 Youth and Intensive Interviews with 100 Young People (Association Press, 1950)
- The Y.M.C.A. in Canada: The Chronicle of a Century (Ryerson Press, 1951)
- New Understandings of Leadership: A Survey and Application of Research with Charles E. Hendry (Association Press, 1957)
- Case Histories in Community Organization (Harper, 1958)
- The new university (University of Toronto Press, 1961)
- New Universities in the Modern World (St. Martin's Press, 1966)
- Community Organization; Theory, Principles, and Practice with B. W. Lappin (Harper & Row, 1967)
- The University: The Anatomy of Academe (McGraw-Hill, 1976)
- Canadian Corporate Directors on the Firing Line: On the Firing Line (McGraw-Hill Ryerson, 1980)
- The Way Must be Tried: Memoirs of a University Man (Stoddart, 1992)
