= Community engagement =

Organizational efforts to benefit community

Community engagement is involvement and participation in an organization for the welfare of the community, and is thus a form of civic engagement.

== Defining characteristics ==
Volunteering, which involves giving personal time to projects in humanitarian NGOs or religious groups, are forms of community involvement. The engagement is generally motivated by values and ideals of social justice. Community engagement can be volunteering at food banks, homeless shelters, emergency assistance programs, neighborhood cleanup programs, etc.

It is also defined as "a dynamic relational process that facilitates communication, interaction, involvement, and exchange between an organization and a community for a range of social and organizational outcomes". As a concept, engagement features attributes of connection, interaction, participation, and involvement, designed to achieve or elicit an outcome at individual, organization, or social levels. Current research acknowledges engagement's socially-situated nature. Community engagement, therefore, offers an ethical, reflexive, and socially responsive approach to community-organizational relationships with engagement practices that aim to both understand and be responsive to community needs, views, and expectations. For academic research to have an impact, community engagement is essential, especially for the research around population health and wellness issues. It is imperative that the researchers employ community-engaged approaches where community members and organizations and researchers work hand-in-hand to identify the problems, co-develop solutions, and recommend policy changes.

Community engagement is a community-centered orientation based in dialogue. Community engagement enables a more contextualized understanding of community members' perceptions of the topics and contexts, and facilitates stronger relationships among and between community members. The outcome of community engagement is ultimately social capital and stronger relational networks. While community organizing involves the process of building a grassroots movement involving communities, community engagement primarily deals with the practice of moving communities toward change, usually from a stalled or similarly suspended position.

== See also ==
- List of community topics
- Community development
- Community building
- Community economic development
- Community emergency response team
- Community practice
- Community service
- Communities That Care
