= 1997 Birthday Honours =

British government recognitions

The 1997 Birthday Honours were announced on 14 June 1997 for the United Kingdom and on 2 June 1997 for New Zealand. Queen's Birthday Honours are announced on or around the date of the Monarch's Official Birthday in the United Kingdom and some Commonwealth countries. The dates vary, both from year to year and from country to country. All are published in supplements to the London Gazette and many are conferred by the monarch (or her representative) some time after the date of the announcement, particularly for those service people on active duty.

Recipients of honours are shown below as they were styled before their new honour.

== United Kingdom ==
=== Life Peers ===
==== Barons ====
- Sir Michael Colin Cowdrey, chairman, International Cricket Council, 1989–1993.
- Field Marshal Sir Peter Inge, former Chief of the Defence Staff.
- Sir Peter Keith Levene, former adviser to the Prime Minister on efficiency and effectiveness.

=== Knights Bachelor ===
- Bryan William Baker, Regional Chairman, West Midlands NHS Executive. For services to health care.
- Professor Jack Edward Baldwin, FRS, Waynflete Professor of Chemistry, University of Oxford, For services to organic chemistry.
- Chay Blyth. For services to sailing.
- Ross Buckland, Chief Executive, Unigate plc. For services to the food industry and to the environment.
- Nicholas Dominic Cadbury, chairman, Cadbury Schweppes plc. For services to the food manufacturing industry.
- Bryan Thomas Alfred Collins, Her Majesty's Chief Inspector of Fire Services. For services to the Fire Service.
- Roger William Cork, Lord Mayor of London. For services to the City of London and for public service.
- Professor John Grimley Evans, Professor of Clinical Gerontology, University of Oxford. For services to medicine.
- Thomas Farmer, chairman and Chief Executive, Kwik Fit Holdings plc. For services to the automotive industry.
- Angus McFarlane McLeod Grossart, former chairman, Board of Trustees, National Galleries of Scotland. For services to the arts.
- John Andrew Harman, Leader, Kirklees Metropolitan Council. For services to local government and to the environment.
- John Southwood Jennings, chairman, Shell Transport and Trading plc. For services to the oil and gas industry.
- Professor Geoffrey Ernest Richard Lloyd, Professor of Ancient Philosophy and Science and Master of Darwin College, University of Cambridge. For services to the history of thought.
- The Honourable James David McGregor, O.B.E., I.S.O., J.P. For distinguished public service in Hong Kong.
- Charles Beech Gordon Masefield. For services to defence exports.
- Professor James Mirrlees, Professor of Political Economy, University of Cambridge. For services to Economic Science.
- Roger Arthur Carver Norrington, C.B.E., Conductor. For services to Music.
- Peter John O'Sullevan, C.B.E., For services to Horse Racing.
- Professor Narendra Babubhai Patel, President, Royal College of Obstetricians and Gynaecologists and chairman, Academy of Medical Royal Colleges and Faculties. For services to Medicine.
- Professor Gareth Gwyn Roberts, F.R.S., Vice-Chancellor, University of Sheffield. For services to Higher Education.
- Donald Alfred Sinden, C.B.E., Actor. For services to Drama.
- Thomas Stoppard, C.B.E., Playwright. For services to Literature.
- Hugh Ridley Sykes, D.L., chairman, Sheffield Development Corporation. For services to Business and for charitable services.
- Arthur Burton Weller, C.B.E. For services to British-Australian relations.
- His Honour Judge Frank John White, Senior Judge, Central London County Court.

=== Order of the Bath ===
==== Knight Grand Cross of the Order of the Bath (GCB) ====
- Air Chief Marshal Sir Richard Johns, K.C.B., C.B.E., L.V.O., Royal Air Force.

==== Dame Commander of the Order of the Bath (DCB) ====
- Ann Elizabeth, Mrs Bowtell, C.B., Permanent Secretary, Department of Social Security.

==== Knight Commander of the Order of the Bath (KCB) ====
- Vice Admiral John Richard Brigstocke.
- Donald William Limon, C.B., Clerk of the House of Commons.
- Air Marshal Peter Ted Squire, D.F.C., A.F.C., Royal Air Force.

==== Companion of the Order of the Bath (CB) ====
Military Division

- Rear Admiral Terence William Loughran.
- Rear Admiral Frederick Peter Scourse, M.B.E.
- Major General Bryan Hawkins Dutton, C.B.E., late The Devonshire and Dorset Regiment.
- Air Vice-Marshal Anthony John Harrison, C.B.E., Royal Air Force.
- Air Vice-Marshal Richard Henry Kyle, M.B.E., Royal Air Force.
- Air Vice-Marshal Robert Peter O'Brien, O.B.E., Royal Air Force.

Civil Division

- John Ernest Avery, Deputy Parliamentary Commissioner for Administration, Office of the Parliamentary Commissioner for Administration.
- Pamela Anne, Mrs Denham, Regional Director, Government Office North East, Department of Trade and Industry.
- David Stanley Grundy, Forestry Commissioner, Forestry Commission.
- Keith Howard Jones, Chief Executive, Medicines Control Agency, Department of Health.
- Eugene McGivern, Director, Personal Tax Division, Her Majesty's Board of Inland Revenue.
- Ronald Blackwood Spence. For Public Service.
- Clifford David Stevens, lately Principal Establishment Officer, Welsh Office.
- Ian James Stewart, Project Director, Job Seekers' Allowance, Department for Education and Employment.
- Neil William Summerton, lately Director, Water and Land, Department of the Environment.
- David Christopher Tyte, Director Rationalisation, Defence Evaluation and Research Agency, Ministry of Defence.
- James Ashton Vallance White, Fourth Clerk at the Table and Clerk of the Judicial Office, House of Lords.

=== Order of St Michael and St George ===
==== Knight Commander of the Order of St Michael and St George (KCMG) ====
- David Elliott Spiby Blatherwick, C.M.G., O.B.E., H.M. Ambassador, Cairo.
- Robert Andrew Burns, C.M.G., Deputy Under-secretary of State, Foreign and Commonwealth Office.
- Anthony Michael Goodenough, C.M.G., British High Commissioner, Ottawa.
- Marrack Irvine Goulding, C.M.G., lately Under-secretary (Political), United Nations.
- Gordon Ying Sheung Wu, managing director, Hopewell Holdings Group. For services to Export.

==== Companion of the Order of St Michael and St George (CMG) ====
- Dr Terence David Adams. For services to British commercial interests in Azerbaijan.
- Graham Robertson Archer, High Commissioner, Valletta.
- Duncan Robin Carmichael Christopher, lately H.M. Ambassador, Addis Ababa.
- Sherard Louis Cowper-Coles, L.V.O., Counsellor, Foreign and Commonwealth Office.
- Robert Francis Cooper, M.V.O., Minister, H.M. Embassy, Bonn.
- John Ingram Denny. For services relating to the refurbishment of the Foreign and Commonwealth Office.
- Peter John Freeman, Counsellor, Foreign and Commonwealth Office.
- Audrey Frances, Mrs Glover, lately Director of the O.S.C.E. Office for Democratic Institutions and Human Rights, Warsaw.
- Stephen John Gomersall, Minister and U.K. Deputy Permanent Representative to the United Nations, New York.
- Alan Norman Hoole, O.B.E., lately H.M. Governor, Anguilla.
- David Kennedy, Director-General, Commonwealth War Graves Commission.
- Roger Stanley Mabey, Director, Bovis Construction Group. For services to Export.
- Neil Macleod McMillan, Director, International Communications Policy, Communications and Information Industries Directorate, Department of Trade and Industry.
- Norman Hamilton McMillan, O.B.E., Counsellor, Foreign and Commonwealth Office.
- Dr John Latimer Munby, O.B.E., Director, British Council, Athens.
- Martin Buchanan Nicholson, Minister-Counsellor, H.M. Embassy, Moscow.
- Alan Roderick Paul, U.K. Representative, Joint Liaison Group, Hong Kong.
- Richard Peter Ralph, C.V.O., H.M. Governor, Falkland Islands.
- Kevin Reginald Tebbit, lately Director of Resources, Foreign and Commonwealth Office.
- Allan Robert Willett, chairman, Willett International Ltd. For services to Export.
- Stephen John Leadbetter Wright, lately Director, European Union Affairs, Foreign and Commonwealth Office.

=== Royal Victorian Order ===
==== Knight Commander of the Royal Victorian Order (KCVO) ====
- John Nigel Courtenay James, C.B.E., Secretary and Keeper of the Records, Duchy of Cornwall.
- Richard Eustace Thornton, O.B.E., Lord Lieutenant of Surrey.

==== Commander of the Royal Victorian Order (CVO) ====
- Stephen James Cox, Director General, Commonwealth Institute.
- David Alexander Cospatrick Douglas-Home, The Earl of Home, C.B.E. For personal services.
- Christopher Kingston Howes, C.B., Second Commissioner and Chief Executive, Crown Estate.
- Major Nigel Donald Peter Chamberlayne-Macdonald, L.V.O., O.B.E., lately Gentleman Usher to The Queen.

==== Lieutenant of the Royal Victorian Order (LVO) ====
- Khalid Aziz, lately Chairman of The Prince's Trust in Hampshire and Chairman of The Prince's Youth Business Trust, Southern Counties.
- John David Bond, M.V.O., lately Keeper of the Savill and Valley Gardens, Crown Estate, Windsor.
- Dr John Hubert Daly Briscoe, Apothecary to the Royal Household at Windsor.
- Michael Thomas Chamberlayne. For personal services.
- Timothy John Ffytche, Surgeon-Oculist to the Royal Household.
- Michael Charles William Norreys Jephson, M.V.O., Chief Clerk, Master of the Household's Department, Royal Household.
- Madeleine, the Honourable Mrs Louloudis, Assistant Private Secretary to The Princess Royal.
- John Hessel Tiltman, Director of Property Services, Royal Household.

==== Member of the Royal Victorian Order (MVO) ====
- James Duncan Baxter, lately Chairman of The Prince's Youth Business Trust in Cheshire (deceased: to be dated 22 May 1997).
- Peter Leonard Brock, Headmaster, Royal School, Great Park, Windsor.
- Sergeant Graham Leonard Craker, Royalty Protection Department, Metropolitan Police.
- Richard Julian Ashton Edwards, Gentleman of the Chapel Royal, St James's Palace.
- Carole, Mrs Grayson, Secretary, Yorkshire Survey, Duchy of Lancaster.
- Miss Margaret Elizabeth Green, Administrator, Property Services, Royal Household.
- William Anderson, Meston, Secretary, Braemar Royal Highland Society.
- Sidney John Sampler, Secretary, Royal Travel Office.
- Sergeant David John Sharp, Royalty Protection Department, Metropolitan Police.
- Miss Rosemary Jetta Tiney, Operational Scheduling Manager (Longhaul), British Airways.
- Miss Ann Wycherley, Assistant Secretary, Royal Warrant Holders Association.

=== Royal Victorian Medal (RVM) ===
==== Bar to the Royal Victorian Medal (Silver) ====
- Reginald Wilcock, R.V.M., Deputy Steward and Page of the Presence to Queen Elizabeth The Queen Mother.

==== Royal Victorian Medal (Silver) ====
- Malcolm Douglas Batterbee, Carpenter, Sandringham Estate.
- Constable Robert Brooks, Royalty Protection Department, Metropolitan Police.
- Paul Burrell, Butler to Diana, Princess of Wales.
- Peter Chong, Chief Gilder, Master of the Household's Department, Royal Household.
- Leonard Critchlow, Assistant Keeper of the Valley Gardens, Crown Estate, Windsor.
- Pauline Marie, Mrs Dodge, Senior Telephone Operator, Royal Household.
- Peter Christopher Noel Garraway, lately Assistant Bailiff, Ascot Racecourse.
- Able Seaman (Missile) Stephen Ernest Hislop, H.M. Yacht Britannia.
- Divisional Sergeant Major Harold Sheldon Howarth, The Queen's Body Guard of the Yeoman of the Guard.
- Allan Keir, Senior Gardener, Palace of Holyroodhouse.
- John Frederick George Kluth, Furniture Manager, Town and County Caterers.
- Barrie Thomas Lovell, Valet to The Duke of Edinburgh.
- Petty Officer Marine Engineering Mechanic (Mechanical) David Tony Rayner, H.M. Yacht Britannia.
- David Eric Stone. For services to the Royal Household.
- Constable Graham Kenneth Stuttard, Royalty Protection Department, Metropolitan Police.
- Terence Peter Sullivan, Fitter, Crown Estate, Windsor.
- Acting Leading Seaman (Missile) David John Wharram, H.M. Yacht Britannia.

=== Companion of Honour ===
- David Hockney, Artist. For services to Art.

=== Order of the British Empire ===
==== Knight Grand Cross of the Order of the British Empire (GBE) ====
- Air Chief Marshal Sir John Willis, K.C.B., C.B.E., Royal Air Force.

==== Dame Commander of the Order of the British Empire (DBE) ====
- Miss Clementine Dinah Laine (Mrs Dankworth), O.B.E., Singer. For services to Jazz Music.

==== Knight Commander of the Order of the British Empire (KBE) ====
- Arthur Leycester Scott Coltman, C.M.G., H.M. Ambassador, Bogota.
- The Reverend John Charlton Polkinghorne, F.R.S. For services to Medical Ethics and to Learning.
- Donald Yam-kuen Tsang, O.B.E., J.P., Financial Secretary, Hong Kong.
- Lieutenant General Christopher Brooke Quentin Wallace, O.B.E. late Royal Green Jackets.

==== Commander of the Order of the British Empire (CBE) ====
Military Division

- Vera May Atkins, Special Operations Executive (SOE). For services to British-French relations.
- Captain (Commodore) Alan John Bannister, Royal Navy.
- Commodore Norman David Squire, Royal Fleet Auxiliary.
- Colonel (Brigadier) Jonathan James Thomson, O.B.E., Q.G.M., Royal Marines.
- Brigadier Anthony David Ball, O.B.E., late Corps of Royal Electrical and Mechanical Engineers.
- Brigadier John David Moore-Bick, O.B.E., late Corps of Royal Engineers.
- Colonel Howard Henry Ham, late Royal Corps of Signals.
- Colonel Patricia Slater Purves, late Adjutant General's Corps (ETS).
- Brigadier Ashley Ernest George Truluck, late Royal Corps of Signals.
- Group Captain Alan James Kearney, Royal Air Force.
- Group Captain John Christopher Owen Luke, Royal Air Force.
- Air Commodore Antony Angus Nicholson, L.V.O., Royal Air Force.

Civil Division

- Professor Edward William Abel, President, Royal Society of Chemistry. For services to Chemistry.
- James Gay Adamson, O.B.E., Vice Chairman, Financial Systems, NCR. For services to the Manufacturing Industry.
- Professor Michael Parries Ashby, F.R.S., Royal Society Research Professor, Department of Engineering, University of Cambridge. For services to Materials Science and to Engineering.
- Kamlesh Bahl (Mrs Lakhani), chairwoman, Equal Opportunities Commission. For services to Equal Opportunities.
- Ian David Hunter Baillie, Director of Social Work, Church of Scotland. For services to Social Care Provision.
- Brian Ford Baldock, lately deputy chairman, Guinness. For services to the Alcoholic Drinks Industry.
- Correlli Douglas Barnett. For services to Military History.
- Professor Thomas Martin Barratt, lately Professor of Paediatric Nephrology, Institute of Child Health, London. For services to Medicine.
- Terence Arthur Bone, lately Area Manager, Prison Service, Home Office.
- James Thomas Bowman, Countertenor. For services to Music.
- Keith James Bridge, chairman, Education Assets Board. For services to Education.
- Professor Amyand David Buckingham, F.R.S., Professor of Chemistry, University of Cambridge. For services to Science.
- Basil Richard Ryland Butler, O.B.E. For services to the Oil Industry and to the Royal Academy of Engineering.
- Francis Anthony Armstrong Carnwath. For services to the Arts and to Heritage.
- Professor Richard Lawrance Carter, lately chairman, Committee on Carcinogenicity. For services to Health Care.
- Campbell Christie, General Secretary. Scottish Trades Union Congress. For services to Industrial Relations.
- Anthony Stephen Close, chairman, Health Education Authority. For services to Health Education.
- Professor Robert Donald Cohen, Professor of Medicine, St Bartholomew's and the Royal London School of Medicine and Dentistry, Queen Mary and Westfield College and chairman, Imperial Cancer Research Fund. For services to Medicine.
- Timothy George Congdon, managing director, Lombard Street Research. For services to Economic Debate.
- William Peter Cooke, chairman, Housing Corporation. For services to Housing.
- Phyliss Margaret Cunningham, Chief Executive, The Royal Marsden NHS Trust. For services to Health Care.
- John Arthur Hugh Curry, chairman, All England Lawn Tennis and Croquet Club. For services to Lawn Tennis.
- Andrew Rodney Dare. For services to Milk Marque and to the Dairy Industry.
- Christine Agnes Murison, Mrs Davis, chairman, Scottish Legal Aid Board. For services to the Legal System.
- Spencer Thomas de Grey. For services to Architecture.
- Joseph Claude Dwek, chairman, Bodycote International plc. For services to Industry and to the Confederation of British Industry in North West England.
- Charles Malcolm Edwards, Director of Contracts, Surface Ships, Ministry of Defence.
- Edwin Bruce Farmer, Group Managing Director, Morgan Crucible Company Ltd. For services to Export.
- Lewis Gilbert, Film Director. For services to the Film Industry.
- Michael John Gillingham, chairman, Advisory Board for Redundant Churches. For services to Church Conservation.
- Michael Goldstein, Vice-Chancellor, Coventry University. For services to Higher Education.
- David Grant, chairman, Technology Foresight Manufacturing, Production and Business Processes Panel. For services to Technology Foresight.
- Edna Eileen Mary, Mrs Gray, O.B.E., chairman, London Youth Games Organising Board. For services to Sport.
- Richard Gunner Greenslade, lately District Judge, Gloucester County Court and President, Association of District Judges.
- Peter Gerard Greenwood, lately chairman, Former Association of District Councils. For services to Local Government.
- Joan Brownlow, Mrs Hanham, Leader of the council, Royal Borough of Kensington and Chelsea. For services to Local Government.
- Miss Barbara Fitzgerald Harvey. For services to Medieval History.
- Robert Hawley, Chief Executive, British Energy plc. For services to the Energy Industry and to Engineering.
- John Charles Hooper, Director General, Incorporated Society of British Advertisers. For services to the Advertising Industry.
- Anthony Michell Howard, Obituaries Editor, The Times. For services to Journalism and to Broadcasting.
- James Alexander Inverarity, O.B.E., chairman, Scottish Agricultural College. For services to Agriculture.
- Professor Arthur S. Jones, Principal, Royal Agricultural College. For services to Agricultural Education.
- George Michael Sinclair Kennedy, O.B.E., Chief Music Critic, The Sunday Telegraph. For services to Music.
- Pendarell Hugh Kent, executive director, Bank of England. For services to Banking.
- David George Lambert, Assistant Chief Inspector, Social Services Inspectorate, Department of Health.
- Richard Douglas Lapthorne, Finance Director, British Aerospace plc. For services to the Aerospace Industry.
- Professor John Hartley Lawton, F.R.S., Director, Centre for Population Biology. For services to Ecology and to the Environment.
- Alasdair Donald MacDuff Liddell, Director of Planning, NHS Executive, Department of Health.
- Ian Malcolm David Little, A.F.C. For services to Economics.
- Miss Gillian Lynne, Choreographer and Director. For services to Dance.
- Angus John MacDonald, Executive Chairman, Scottish Media Group plc. For services to Broadcasting.
- Professor Margaret Anne MacKeith, Pro Vice-Chancellor, University of Central Lancashire. For services to Higher Education.
- Archibald MacLaren, Chief Valuer Scotland, Valuation Office Agency, Her Majesty's Board of Inland Revenue.
- Professor Duncan MacLennan, Founding Board Member, Scottish Homes. For services to Housing Policy.
- Professor Norman MacKay, Dean of Postgraduate Medicine, University of Glasgow and President, Royal College of Physicians and Surgeons of Glasgow. For services to Medicine.
- Humfrey Jonathan Malins, Trustee, Immigration Advisory Service. For services to Immigration Policy.
- Allen Short Matheson. For services to Architecture.
- Kenneth Wilkie McKay, lately Head, Local Government Current Expenditure Division, Scottish Office.
- William Patrick McLennan, A.M., Former Director, Central Statistical Office. For services to Statistics and to the creation of the Office for National Statistics.
- Michael Michael, Head, VAT and Excise Advisory Division, Solicitor's Office, Her Majesty's Customs and Excise.
- Edward Ouri Mirzoeff, C.V.O., Executive Producer, Documentaries, BBC TV. For services to Broadcasting.
- Ian Sydney Mitchelson, lately Chief Executive, Service Children's Education, Ministry of Defence.
- Professor Fabian Charles Monds. For services to Economic Development.
- Andrew Neil Morrison, Q.F.S.M., Her Majesty's Chief Inspector of Fire Services for Scotland. For services to the Fire Service.
- Russell Vernon Nathan, lately chairman, Thames Valley Enterprise Training and Enterprise Council. For services to Training.
- The Reverend John Anthony Newton. For services to Ecumenical Relations in Liverpool, Merseyside.
- Alison, Mrs Norman, chairman, Standing Nursing and Midwifery Advisory Committee. For services to Health Care.
- Francis Harry Panton, M.B.E. For services to Nuclear Affairs Policy.
- Nicholas Wulstan Park. For services to the Animated Film Industry.
- Professor Jane Anne Plant, assistant director and Head, Minerals, Environment and Geochemical Surveys Division, British Geological Survey. For services to the Earth Sciences.
- Miss Zandra Lindsey Rhodes, Fashion and Textile Designer. For services to the Fashion Industry.
- Professor Geraint Meinvyn Roberts, Dean of Medicine and Head, Department of Diagnostic Radiology, University of Wales College of Medicine. For services to Medicine.
- Kenneth George Robinson. For services to Tourism.
- Aubrey Rose, O.B.E., Senior Vice President, Board of Deputies of British Jews. For services to Community Relations.
- Robin Guy Sequeira, lately Director of Social Services, Dorset County Council. For services to Social Services.
- Professor Richard Wright Shaw, Principal, University of Paisley and Convenor, Committee of Scottish Higher Education Principals. For services to Higher Education.
- Professor Colin John Smith, Dean, Sheffield Dental School. For services to Dental Education.
- David Charles Snell, Director, Finance and Corporate Services and Deputy Chief Executive, Royal Mint.
- Abraham Kenneth Snowman. For services to the Fine Arts and for charitable services.
- Professor William Thomas Stearn. For services to Horticulture and Botany.
- Brian Michael Tanner, lately Chief Executive, Somerset County Council. For services to Local Government.
- Francis William Taylor, Q.P.M., D.L., Chief Constable, Durham Constabulary. For services to the Police.
- Kevin Christopher Taylor, Assistant Chief Veterinary Officer, Ministry of Agriculture, Fisheries and Food.
- Robert Murray Ross Taylor. For services to Medical Charities.
- Rachel Mary, Mrs Thomas, Commissioner, Countryside Commission. For services to the Countryside, National Parks, Forestry and Rural Development.
- Terence James Thomas, chairman, North West Partnership. For services to Business and to Urban Regeneration in North West England.
- John Daniel Thompson, D.L. For services to Health Care and to the community.
- Michael John Tomlinson, Director of Inspection, Office for Standards in Education.
- Thomas Rudolph Vyner, Group Deputy Chairman, J. Sainsbury plc. For services to Food Retailing.
- John Howard Webb. For services to the Actuarial Profession.
- John Weston Whitaker, Divisional Manager, School Organisation Branch, Department of Education and Employment.
- James Ramsay Wilson, managing director, Appledore Shipbuilders Ltd. For services to the Shipbuilding Industry.
- Anthony George Hurst Withey, Chief Executive, Remploy Ltd. For services to the Employment of Disabled People.
- Christopher Mervyn Woodman, lately Head, Highways Policy and Programmes Division, Department of Transport.
- William David Woolley, lately Grade 4, Fire Research Station, Building Research Establishment, Department of the Environment.
- Professor Harold John Wootton, lately Chief Executive, Transport Research Laboratory. For services to Transport Research.
- David John Wright, managing director, GKN Aerospace and Special Vehicles. For services to the Defence Industry.
- Martin Hugh Wyld, Chief Restorer, National Gallery.
- Martin Gilbert Barrow, O.B.E., J.P. For public and community service in Hong Kong.
- Martin John Dinham, Personal Advisor to H.M. Governor, Hong Kong.
- Hui Ki-on, Q.P.M., C.P.M., Commissioner, Royal Hong Kong Police Force.
- Simon Ip Sik-on, O.B.E., J.P. For services to teacher training in Hong Kong.
- Peter Lai Hing-ling, J.P., Secretary for Security, Hong Kong.
- Bowen Leung Po-wing, J.P., Secretary for Planning, Environment, and Lands, Hong Kong.
- The Honourable Felice, Mrs Lieh-Mak, O.B.E., J.P. For public service in Hong Kong.
- Nicholas Ng Wing-fui, J.P., Secretary for Constitutional Affairs, Hong Kong.
- Gordon Siu, J.P., Secretary for Transport, Hong Kong.
- The Honourable David Edmund Wilkinson. For public service in Bermuda.

==== Officer of the Order of the British Empire (OBE) ====
Military Division

- Commander Richard John Albery, Royal Navy.
- Commander John David Bray, Royal Navy.
- Commander Richard Desmond Coupe, Royal Navy.
- Commander Peter Dixon Crabtree, Royal Navy.
- Commander Roger Charles Harvey, Royal Navy.
- Commander Peter Brenton Hinchliffe, Royal Navy.
- Commander William Richard Scott Jenkins, Royal Navy.
- Commander Stephen John Timms, Royal Navy.
- Lieutenant Colonel John Harold Brunt, T.D., Corps of Royal Electrical and Mechanical Engineers, Territorial Army.
- Lieutenant Colonel Roger Ian Stuart Burgess, 9th/12th Royal Lancers.
- Lieutenant Colonel Ian Michael Caws, Corps of Royal Engineers.
- Lieutenant Colonel Paul Norrington-Davies, The Royal Regiment of Wales.
- Lieutenant Colonel Anthony John Hayhurst, Army Air Corps.
- Lieutenant Colonel John Michael May, The Royal Logistic Corps.
- Lieutenant Colonel (Acting Colonel) Robert Adam Mungo Simpson Melvin, M.B.E., Corps of Royal Engineers.
- Lieutenant Colonel Nicholas John Newell, Intelligence Corps.
- Lieutenant Colonel Robert William Hunt Purdy, M.B.E., Royal Regiment of Artillery.
- Lieutenant Colonel Richard Mark James Rollowalker, The Light Infantry.
- Wing Commander Graham Alan Bowerman, Royal Air Force.
- Wing Commander Norman Branagh, Royal Air Force.
- Wing Commander Jennifer Cugley, Royal Air Force.
- Wing Commander David Eric Eighteen, Royal Air Force.
- Wing Commander (now Group Captain) Christopher David Evans, Royal Air Force.
- Wing Commander Richard Robert Charles Parsley, Royal Air Force.
- Wing Commander Barrington Phillip Simmonds, Royal Air Force.
- Wing Commander Peter Charles Taylor, Royal Air Force.
- Wing Commander Christopher Edward Wick, Royal Air Force.

Civil Division

- Gordon Dudley Adams, Secretary, Commission for Local Administration in England. For services to Local Government.
- Charles Kingsley Allatt, B1 Deputy Controller Business Operations, Her Majesty's Board of Inland Revenue.
- Richard James Colin Anderson, For services to the community and to Industry.
- Timothy Morris Angel, chairman, Angels and Bermans. For services to the Theatre, Film and Television.
- Peter Arkell. For services to British-American Community Relations at RAF Fairford, Gloucestershire.
- Miranda Sarah, Mrs Armitage. For services to the British Red Cross Society in North Yorkshire.
- Michael Andrew Atherton. For services to Cricket.
- James Att Wood. For services to Education in the Construction Industry.
- Roy Frederick Victor Aylott, City Engineer, Corporation of London. For services to Engineering and to the City of London.
- David John Babb, lately Grade 7, Department of Trade and Industry.
- George William Baron. For services to the community on Alderney, Channel Islands.
- Geoffrey Michael Barwell. For services to the Royal British Legion.
- Trevor Graham Baylis, Inventor of the Portable Clockwork Radio. For humanitarian services.
- Alfred James Beale, Member, Board of Governors, Centre for Information on Language Teaching and Research. For services to Education.
- Gordon George Beaumont, chairman, Evaluation Advisory Group of the review of NVQs and SVQs. For services to Education.
- Professor Ian Crawford Benington. For services to Dentistry.
- Michael Robert William Berry. For services to Training and to Tourism in Cumbria.
- Amir Bhatia, Member, National Lottery Charities Board. For charitable services.
- William Howard Blackburn. For services to Franco-British Legal Relations.
- Barry John Blain, Assistant Project Director, Home Office.
- Michael Bond, Writer. For services to Children's Literature.
- Professor Margaret Rosetta Brazier, chairman, Animal Procedures Committee. For services to Animal Welfare.
- Margaret Anne, Mrs Bridge, Grade 6, Department of Trade and Industry.
- John Broadbent, chairman, National Council for Voluntary Youth Services. For services to Young People.
- John David Brown, Grade 7, Ministry of Defence.
- Professor Victoria Geraldine Bruce, Professor of Psychology and Deputy Principal, University of Stirling. For services to Psychology.
- Ann Elizabeth, Mrs Brum. For services to the community in Barnet, Hertfordshire.
- Anthony Charles Buxton, Director, Guns and Vehicles, BAe (Royal Ordnance). For services to Engineering and to the Defence Industry.
- Kenneth Cameron, Member, Dumfries and Galloway Council. For services to Local Government.
- Andrew Robertson Campbell. For services to Agriculture.
- Maurice Donaldson Cantley, lately Director, Projects and Marketing, Highland and Islands Enterprise. For services to the Highlands and Islands.
- Brian Carlin. For services to Industry.
- Rachel Elizabeth, Carmichael. For services to Health Care in Leicestershire.
- Christopher Douglas Carr, Audit Manager, National Audit Office.
- Ian James Carruthers, Chief Executive, Dorset Health Authority. For services to Health Care.
- Alan Telfer Chape, Assistant Chief Executive, Liverpool City Council. For services to Urban Regeneration.
- Alfred Guy Chappell, lately Consultant Physician and Clinical Director of Medicine, Bridgend and District NHS Trust. For services to Medicine.
- Brian Howard Charles, lately chairman, Dwr Cymru (Welsh Water). For services to the Water Industry.
- Peter Eric Gravell Charles, lately Grade 7, Health and Safety Executive, Department of the Environment.
- Miss Josephine Alicia Churchill. For services to the National Federation of Music Societies.
- Alan John Clark, lately Grade 6, Highways Agency, Department of Transport.
- Anthony John Clark, Divisional Head, Roslin Institute. For services to Biotechnology.
- David John Clinch, Secretary, The Open University. For services to Higher Education.
- Robert Cockburn. For services to Magistracy and to the community in Rotherham, South Yorkshire.
- Nicola Constance, Mrs Cogan, Physiotherapy Officer, Department of Health.
- Professor Richard Reginald Rupert Tilleard-Cole. For services to the Oxford University Officers' Training Corps.
- Timothy Cook, Clerk, City Parochial Foundation. For charitable services.
- Terry Creissen, Principal, Colne Community School, Essex. For services to Education.
- Bernard David James Crisp. For services to Soldiers' Sailors' and Airmen's Families Association in London.
- Philip Croft. For services to Disabled People.
- Andrew Crofts, Principal Professional and Technology Officer, Ministry of Defence.
- Maneck Ardeshir Sohrab Dalal, chairman, UK Bharatiya Vidya Bhavan. For services to Community Relations.
- Professor Kenneth Jackson Davey, Professor of Development Administration, University of Birmingham. For services to the Know How Fund.
- Edward John James Davies. For services to the community in North Wales.
- Martin Neil Davies, Assistant Chief Constable, South Yorkshire Police. For services to the Police.
- Sylvia Ann, Mrs Davies. For services to Nursing in South East Wales.
- Nigel Dodds. For services to Local Government.
- Cedric John Dowe, Team Leader, Special Educational Needs Independent Team, Department for Education and Employment.
- Ruth, Mrs Draycott, chairman, National Advisory Council of Boards of Visitors. For services to Prisoner Welfare.
- Miss Elizabeth Duffin. For services to Health Care.
- Malcolm Coit Dunlop. For services to Disabled People.
- Alan William Duttine, Co-Managing Director, Airedale International Air Conditioning Ltd. For services to Export.
- Hubert Theodor Elsasser, Chief Engraver, Royal Mint.
- Harold Meurig Evans. For services to the Welsh Language and Wales.
- Professor Julian Evans. For services to Forestry and to the Third World.
- Professor Robert Wallace Ewart. For services to Higher Education.
- Miss Adye Mary Fedden (Mrs Trevelyan), Painter. For services to Art.
- Barbara, Mrs Fisher, Chairman of Governors, Yehudi Menuhin School, Cobham, Surrey. For services to Music Education.
- Avril, Mrs Fishwick, D.L. For services to the community in Wigan, Greater Manchester.
- James John Maitland Flegg, lately Director of External Relations, Horticulture Research International, Ministry of Agriculture, Fisheries and Food.
- Alan McKay Fletcher, lately Grade 7, Forestry Commission.
- Janis Richardson, Mrs Fletcher, chairwoman, MSF Motor Group Ltd. For services to Industry.
- Trevor David Ford. For services to Geology and Cave Science.
- Michael Foy, Grade 7, Ministry of Defence.
- Philip Michael Gaffney, managing director, Seescan plc. For services to the Promotion of Technology Transfer.
- Paul John Gallagher, Principal, Bradford and Ilkley Community College, West Yorkshire, For services to Further Education.
- David Garlick, Head, International Assistance, Her Majesty's Customs and Excise.
- Christopher John McLean Gebbie, lately chairman, East Sussex Drugs Advisory Council. For services to Tackling Drugs Misuse.
- Vincent Michael Goodman, lately Principal Crown Prosecutor, Crown Prosecution Service.
- John Henry Grant. For services to Agriculture.
- Robert Frederick Hall, Q.G.M. For services to the Police.
- Samuel James Hall, Solicitor. For services to the Ministry of Defence (Navy Department) in Scotland.
- Stephen Andrew Hancocks, Editor-in-Chief, F.D.I. World Dental Press Ltd., and Communications Manager, General Dental Council. For services to the Dental Profession.
- David Frederick Harper. For services to the Farmers' Overseas Action Group.
- Norman David Haste, lately Project Director, John Laing Civil Engineering. For services to the Construction Industry.
- David Farrell Helsdon, Deputy Collector, Southern England, Her Majesty's Customs and Excise.
- Professor Joseph Helszajn, Professor of Microwave Engineering, Heriot-Watt University. For services to Engineering.
- Clare Elizabeth, Mrs Hepworth, chairwoman, Three Rivers Housing Association. For services to Social Housing.
- Miss Angela Heylin. For services to the Prime Minister's Advisory Panel on the Citizen's Charter.
- Keith S. Hodgson, Controller of Stamps, Her Majesty's Board of Inland Revenue.
- Peter David Holliday, lately Chief Executive, Admiral Homes. For services to Energy Efficiency.
- David Hook, lately County Engineer, Oxfordshire County Council. For services to Road Safety.
- Major Derek Frank Hooton, T.D., D.L., Leader, Wellingborough Borough Council. For services to the community in Northamptonshire.
- John William Hughes, T. D. For public service.
- Frederick William Hulton, chairman, Local Investment Fund. For services to Urban Regeneration.
- Professor John Angus Alexander Hunter, Grant Professor of Dermatology, University of Edinburgh and Consultant Dermatologist, Edinburgh Royal Infirmary. For services to Medicine.
- Owen Douglas Hydes, Deputy Chief Inspector, Drinking Water Inspectorate, Department of the Environment.
- James Jackson, Director, Alzheimer Scotland. For charitable services.
- Kate, Mrs Jackson, Director, Changing Childbirth Implementation Team. For services to Midwifery.
- John Robert Maurice Jacobs. For services to Golf.
- Maureen Sybil, Mrs Jones. For services to WRVS in Wales.
- Jafferhusein Akberali Kapasi, Vice President, Leicestershire Asian Business Association. For services to Business in Leicestershire.
- Miss Ruth Edith Julia Kaufmann, Director, BBC Children in Need Appeal. For charitable services.
- Miss Judith Pamela Kelly, artistic director, West Yorkshire Playhouse. For services to the Theatre.
- Michael Stanton King, Surgeon. For services to Surgery in Developing Countries.
- Paul Raymond King, D.L. For services to the community in Norwich, Norfolk.
- Reginald David Kingston. For services to Cancer Research in Trafford, Greater Manchester.
- Miss Dorothy Craig Kinloch, Chief Commissioner of Scotland, The Scout Association. For services to the Scouting Movement.
- Trevor Asher Kletz. For services to Industrial Safety.
- Michael Anthony Knowles, lately chairman and Chief Executive, M. W. Marshall & Co. Ltd. For services to the Finance Industry.
- Alastair de Saumarez Dacre Lacy, Director and International Affairs Adviser, Babcock Technical Services Ltd. For services to the London Chamber of Commerce and to Export.
- Richard Ernest Lane. For services to Business and to the community in Bromley, Kent.
- David Charles Frederick Latham, Deputy Managing Director, Anglian Water International. For services to the Water Industry.
- David Lawless, lately Grade 7, Overseas Development Administration.
- John Bryan Leck. For services to the community in North West England.
- Miss Audrey Mary Lees, lately chairman, Inland Waterways Amenity Advisory Council. For services to Inland Waterways and to Planning.
- John Stanley Lewis, Head of Combustion Engineering, Rolls-Royce plc. For services to Aero Engineering.
- Maurice Gilbert Joseph Lickens. For services to Tourism on the Isle of Wight.
- John Arthur Lloyd, D.L. For services to Magistracy in Swansea.
- Antonella, The Marchioness of Lothian. For services to Women's Issues and for charitable services to Blind People.
- Roger Reynolds Lovegrove. For services to the Royal Society for the Protection of Birds and to Conservation in Wales.
- Phillip Anthony Lowe, lately Executive Chairman, Yorkshire Chemicals plc. For services to the Chemicals Industry.
- John Neil Lucas, Officer in Charge, Her Majesty's Board of Inland Revenue.
- Professor John Ernest Carmichael Macbeath, Director, Quality in Education Centre, University of Strathclyde. For services to Education.
- Alistair Iain Macdonald, B2 Business Adviser, Her Majesty's Board of Inland Revenue.
- Miss Anne Elizabeth Mace, Chief Probation Officer, West Yorkshire. For services to the Probation Service.
- Colin James Macey, Senior Principal, Meteorological Office, Ministry of Defence.
- Terry J. Mahoney, D. L. For services to Local Government in Wales.
- Neil Kenneth Maitland, lately chairman, London Federation of Clubs for Young People. For services to Young People.
- Lieutenant Colonel Philip Mantle, T.D. For services to Magistracy in the County of Caerphilly.
- Richard Henry Marriott, Director, British Telecommunications plc. For services to the Telecommunications Industry.
- Paul Charles Marsh. For services to Forestry.
- Jean Elizabeth, Lady Mayhew of Twysden. For services to Community Relations and to charitable causes.
- Terence Hugh McCartney. For services to the Textile Industry in Northern Ireland.
- Miss Maeve Theresa McDonald, chairman, Children's Panel Advisory Committee, Glasgow City Council. For services to Children's Panels.
- David John McDonough, Grade 6, Prison Service, Home Office.
- Thomas McGrath. For services to Education.
- George Bennett McKelvie, chairman, Stirling Royal Infirmary NHS Trust. For services to Health Care.
- Malcolm McLean, lately Grade 6, Department of Social Security.
- John Percival Mellor, Q.S.M. For services to Soldiers', Sailors' and Airmen's Families Association in the West Midlands.
- Beryl, Mrs Melvin, T.D., lately Deputy Chief Nursing Officer, Welsh Office.
- Margaret Alice, Mrs Merritt, lately Grade 7, Ministry of Defence.
- Eric Buchan Miller, Grade 7, Scottish Office.
- Peter Mitchell. For services to the British Motor Industry Heritage Trust.
- Barrie Morgan, Principal Professional and Technology Officer, Ministry of Defence.
- Martyn Richard Morris, Headteacher, Bacup and Rawtenstall Grammar School, Lancashire. For services to Education.
- Peter Moxon, Chief Commissioner of England (Central), Scout Association. For services to Scouting.
- Alan Loudon Scott Munro, Team Leader, Marine Laboratory, Scottish Office.
- Denis Murray, BBC Ireland Correspondent. For services to Broadcasting.
- Miss Elizabeth Hawkins Nelson, chairman, Ecolabelling Board. For services to Ecolabelling.
- Priscilla Jane, Mrs Newell, lately chairman, Maxwell Pensioners Trust.
- John Charles Norman. For services to the community, especially the RNLI, on Jersey, Channel Islands.
- James Kenneth Murray Oliver. For services to Farming and to the community in Scotland.
- Michael Douglas Oxnard. For services to Forestry in Wales.
- Miss Maureen Janet Packwood, lately Chief Executive, Weald of Kent Community NHS Trust. For services to Health Care and to Disabled People.
- Kirit Pathak, chairman, Pataks Spices Ltd. For services to the Food Industry and to Export.
- James McIntosh Patrick, Artist. For services to Art.
- Anne Elizabeth, Mrs Pearce, Director, Field Bureaux Services, National Association of Citizens' Advice Bureaux. For services to Citizen's Advice Bureaux Movement.
- Kenneth George Pearson, Technical Director, Three Quays Marine Services. For services to Marine Safety.
- Professor Kenneth George Pease, Professor of Criminology, University of Huddersfield. For services to Crime Prevention.
- Michael Pender, lately Equal Opportunities and Human Resources Projects Manager, EmploymentService, Department for Education and Employment.
- Christopher William Milner Penn, lately Leader, Conservative Group, Suffolk County Council. For services to Local Government.
- Robin Pooley, managing director, Anglian Produce Ltd. For services to Agricultural Marketing.
- Professor John George Pope, Grade 6, Ministry of Agriculture, Fisheries and Food.
- Neville Frederick Povey. For services to Civil Service charities.
- Arthur John Mason Price, chairman, Arthur Price of England. For services to the Cutlery Industry.
- Margaret Theresa, Mrs Prosser, National Organiser, Transport and General Workers Union. For services to Industrial Relations and to Women's Issues.
- Verney Watson Pugh, M.B.E. For services to Agriculture.
- Philip James Pye, Dean, Faculty of Health Studies, University of Wales (Bangor). For services to Nursing.
- Alan Edward Ransome. For services to Table Tennis.
- Terence Leslie Rayson, lately Clerk of the Lists, Royal Courts of Justice, Lord Chancellor's Department.
- David Henry Patrick Read, Chief Executive, JP Fruit Distributors Ltd. For services to the Fruit Industry.
- The Reverend Canon Martin Alan Reardon, General Secretary, Churches Together in England. For services to Ecumenism.
- William Reid, managing director, Brown Brothers Ltd. For services to Marine Engineering in Scotland.
- David Reynolds, Group Controller of Entertainment, Yorkshire Tyne Tees TV. For services to the Broadcasting Industry.
- Kenneth Richardson, Senior Director, Medicinal Drug Discovery, Pfizer Central Research. For services to Scientific Research.
- Roger Leslie Richardson, Photogrammetric and Specialist Surveys Manager, Ordnance Survey, Department of the Environment.
- Margaret Anne, Mrs Roberts, Chair of Governors, Clarendon College, Nottingham. For services to Education and to the community.
- Gabrielle Christine, Mrs Robertson. For services to Soldiers' Sailors' and Airmen's Families Association in Scotland.
- David Norman Robinson. For services to Journalism and to the community in Lincolnshire.
- Victor Holland Robinson, Architect. For services to Architecture.
- John Michael Robotham, chairman, Institute of Advanced Motorists. For services to Road Safety.
- Robert J. Rodgers. For services to Education.
- Alan Mackenzie Rome, Church Architect and Trustee, Churches Conservation Trust. For services to Conservation.
- Professor John Francis Roulston, Technical Director. GEC Marconi Avionics Ltd. For services to Airborne Radar.
- Kenneth David Rubens. For charitable services to the Jewish Community.
- Dominic James Stephen Savage, Chief Executive, British Educational Suppliers Association. For services to the Educational Supplies Industry.
- David Michael Scott. For services to the Almshouse Association.
- Letitia Josephine, Mrs Scott, District Manager, Employment Service, Department for Education and Employment.
- Harold Scrimshaw. For services to the former Association of District Councils and to the community in Bolsover, Derbyshire.
- Subramaniam Shanmugam, Grade 6, Highways Agency, Department of Transport.
- Ann, Mrs Sheen, executive director of Nursing, Royal Berkshire and Battle Hospitals NHS Trust. For services to Health Care.
- Miss Jane Elizabeth Siberry, Grade 5, Ministry of Defence.
- Neil Singleton, lately Group Director, Social Services, Cheshire County Council. For services to Social Work.
- Derek Bowman Smart, lately Personnel Director, Nuclear Electric plc. For services to the Electricity Industry.
- Raymond Malcolm Dennis Smith, lately Director, Central Advice Unit, PACE, Cabinet Office (Office of Public Service).
- Walter Ferguson Smith, Manager, Glasgow Rangers Football Club. For services to Association Football.
- Miss Patricia Muriel Snell, Chief Executive, UK SKILLS. For services to Skills Development.
- Belinda Maris Crossley, Lady Somerleyton. For services to the British Red Cross Society in Suffolk.
- Professor George Somerville, Director of Engineering, British Cement Association. For services to Civil Engineering.
- John Brian Southern, M.B.E. For services to Tourism, especially for Disabled People.
- Leslie Thomas Sparks, Director of Planning and Architecture, Birmingham City Council. For services to Regeneration.
- Miss Sarah Marcella Springman. For services to Sport.
- Geoffrey William Squire, Chief Executive, Open Vision Technologies Ltd. For services to the Information Technology Industry.
- Richard John Staite, Headteacher, Beeslack Community High School, Penicuik, Midlothian. For services to Education.
- Malcolm John Stewart, Senior Principal Scientific Officer, Defence Evaluation and Research Agency, Ministry of Defence.
- David Radcliffe Stone, lately managing director, Business Development, British Steel Engineering Steels. For services to Industry in Yorkshire and Humberside.
- John Henry Stone, Headteacher, Bishop Vaughan Catholic Comprehensive School, Swansea. For services to Education.
- Graham Storey. For services to Victorian Literature.
- The Reverend Prebendary Alan John Tanner, chairman, Haemophilia Society. For services to Health Care.
- Monica, Mrs Tarring, Vice-chairman, Council for Voluntary Action, South Lakeland. For charitable services.
- Brian William Tatam, lately Grade 7, Court Service, Lord Chancellor's Department.
- Alexander James Taylor, chairman, Grampian Healthcare NHS Trust. For services to Health Care.
- Paul Burgess Taylor, Chief Executive, West Lothian NHS Trust. For services to Health Care.
- Winifride Mary, Mrs Taylor, D.L. For services to the community in London.
- Professor David John Tedford, emeritus Professor of Electrical Engineering, University of Strathclyde. For services to Science and Engineering.
- Anthony John Temple, Chief Executive, Oldham Careers Service, Lancashire. For services to Education.
- Roger Geraint Thomas. For services to Business and to Culture in Wales.
- David Geoffrey Colin-Thome, General Medical Practitioner, Fellow in Health Services Management, University of Manchester and Senior Medical Officer, N.H.S.M.E., The Scottish Office. For services to Medicine.
- Alfred Henry Thompson. Chief Fire Officer, County Durham and Darlington Fire and Rescue Brigade. For services to the Fire Service.
- John Alan Tidmarsh, Presenter, Outlook, BBC World Service. For services to Broadcasting.
- Francis Torbett, Human Resources Manager, Her Majesty's Board of Inland Revenue.
- James Scott Tweed, lately Resident Magistrate, Lord Chancellor's Department.
- Christopher Robin Waite, Chief Planner (Strategic Development), Kent County Council. For services to Planning.
- George Walker, lately Governor 2, Prison Service Headquarters, Home Office.
- Peter Robin Walker, lately deputy director, Business in Europe Directorate, Department of Trade and Industry.
- Professor David Graham Walters. For services to Energy Efficiency.
- Robert Mackay Watt, lately Chief Inspector, Animals (Scientific Procedures) Inspectorate, Home Office.
- Vera M., Mrs Weisfeld, President, Weisfelds plc. For services to Retailing.
- The Reverend Malcolm Weisman. For services to Jewish communities.
- Terence Charles Ernest Wells, Head, Environmental Management Section, Institute of Terrestrial Ecology. For services to Botany and to Conservation.
- Antony Cowburn Whitaker, Legal Manager, Times Newspapers Ltd. For services to the Newspaper Industry.
- Ronald Anthony Whittle, Senior Partner, Go Whittle Bus and Coach Company. For services to Public Transport.
- David Glyndwr Williams, managing director, Freight Group British Railways Board. For services to the Railways.
- Charlotte Clara Dallas, Mrs Williamson. For services to the York Health NHS Trust.
- Simon Casimir Wilson, Curator of Interpretation, Tate Gallery.
- David Somerville Wishart, Senior Legal Officer, Her Majesty's Board of Inland Revenue.
- Miss Victoria Wood (Mrs Durham), Comedian. For services to Entertainment.
- David Frank Worrall, lately Grade 7, Department of Social Security.
- David Keith Wray, Grade 7, Ministry of Defence.
- Robert Annesley Wright. For services to Industry and to the community in North East Wales.
- Eleanor Jane, Mrs Young. For services to the community in Darlington, County Durham.

Diplomatic Service and Overseas List

- Anthony John Abbott, M.B.E., H.M. Consul-General, Perth.
- Professor David Keith Adams. For services to North American studies in the U.K.
- Betty Molesworth, Mrs Allen. For services to botany, latterly in Spain.
- Kenneth Christopher Barrymore James Allen, Q.C. For public service in Montserrat.
- Liliana, Mrs Archibald. For voluntary public service, latterly as Chairman of Wilton Park Academic Council.
- Colin Robert Armstrong. For services to British trade with Latin America.
- Alexander Au Siu-kee, J.P. For services to heritage conservation in Hong Kong.
- Francis Raymond Baker, lately First Secretary, H.M. Embassy, Ankara.
- Dr Philip Woolf Baker. For services to Chinese political refugees in the U.K.
- John Banks. For services to the Ditchley Foundation in Canada.
- Philip Robert Barton, lately First Secretary, British High Commission, New Delhi.
- Peter Graham Batey. For services to British trade with China.
- Michael John Bennett, M.B.E., lately First Secretary, H.M. Embassy, Vienna.
- Ronald James Blake, J.P., lately Secretary for Works, Hong Kong.
- William Hume James Blanchard, M.V.O., First Secretary, Foreign and Commonwealth Office.
- Francis Bong Shu-ying. For services to civil engineering and construction in the Far East.
- Nicholas Brentnall. For services to banking overseas, latterly in Armenia.
- John Herrick Bunney, Counsellor, H.M. Embassy, Riyadh.
- Michael Charles St Johnston Cannon. For services to British trade with Latin America.
- Stephen Chatt. For services to newspaper publishing in Hungary.
- Professor Chen Char-nie, J.P. For services to public health in Hong Kong.
- Moses Cheng Mo-chi. For public and voluntary community service in Hong Kong.
- Fanny, Mrs Cheung Mui-ching, J.P., chairperson, Equal Opportunities Commission, Hong Kong.
- Peter Cheung, Q.F.S.M., C.P.M., J.P., Director of Fire Services, Hong Kong.
- Chiang Chen. For services to the modernisation of manufacturing industry in Hong Kong.
- Joseph Chow Ming-kuen, J.P. For voluntary community service in Hong Kong.
- Neville Bruce Coltman. For services to British interests in Georgia, U.S.A.
- Stephen Michael Constant. For services to U.K.-Norwegian relations.
- Roger George Cousins. Chief Secretary, Turks and Caicos Islands.
- David Alan Gilbert Facey, lately Director, Air Defence Systems, NATO.
- Alice Yuen-ying, Mrs Tai Footman, J.P. For service to judicial administration in Hong Kong.
- Robert Charles Law Footman, J.P., Postmaster-General, Hong Kong.
- The Reverend Canon James Woodcock Francis. For services to the Islanders' welfare, Bermuda.
- Dr Margaret Chan Fung Fu-chun, J.P. Director of Health, Hong Kong.
- Christopher Edward Wollaston Mackenzie Geidt. For services to British interests in Bosnia.
- Michael Rhys Griffiths. For services to British commercial interests in Italy.
- John Royston Grundon. For services to British commercial interests in the Middle East.
- Malcolm Robert Hunter. For voluntary service to the British community in Argentina.
- Gordon Huskisson, First Secretary, Foreign and Commonwealth Office.
- Christopher Iain Carlyle Jackson, J.P., Minister, Hong Kong Economic and Trade Affairs Office, H.M. Embassy, Washington.
- Serena, Mrs Jin Sheng-hwa. For services to the promotion of language translation in Hong Kong.
- Andrew Stephen Kane. For services to British business interests in Southern California.
- Stephen Lam Sui-lung, J.P., Director, Handover Ceremony Co-ordination Office, Hong Kong.
- Lee Jark-pui, M.B.E., J.P. For charitable community service in Hong Kong.
- Lee Shing-see, J.P., Director of Territory Development, Hong Kong.
- Timothy John Berners-Lee. For services to global computer networking.
- Michael John Leonard. For services to development assistance in Zimbabwe.
- Kerry Frederick McGlynn, Information Coordinator, Government House, Hong Kong.
- John Anthony Miller, J.P., Director of Housing, Hong Kong.
- Robert Douglas Pope, J.P., Director of Lands, Hong Kong.
- Ronald Hyam Rakusen, For services to British business interests in Hong Kong.
- John Arthur Richards, Director, British Council, Thailand.
- Peter John Skelton, Director, British Council, East Jerusalem.
- Lawrence Francis Timothy Smith, Senior Adviser (Middle East and North Africa), Bank of England.
- Patrick John Spaven, lately Director, British Council, Barcelona.
- Professor Colin Stevenson. For services to special educational needs in Eastern Europe.
- David Wing-cheung Tang. For community service in Hong Kong.
- Tsang Yam-pui, Q.P.M., C.P.M., Deputy Commissioner, Royal Hong Kong Police Force.
- Lieutenant Colonel Paul Macintosh Williams, First Secretary, Protocol Department, Foreign and Commonwealth Office.
- Frank Wong Kwong-shing. For services to finance in Hong Kong.
- Wong Tsan-kwong, Q.P.M., C.P.M., Deputy Commissioner, Royal Hong Kong Police Force.
- Alexander Chung-ho Woo. For services to manufacturing industry and the community in Hong Kong.

==== Member of the Order of the British Empire (MBE) ====
Military Division

- Lieutenant Commander Paul Robert Brundle, Royal Navy.
- Charge Chief Marine Engineering Artificer (ML) Thomas Buchanan.
- Petty Officer Wren Writer Debra Hampton.
- Warrant Officer Peter Hitchcock.
- Petty Officer Writer Christian Rubin Jennings.
- Lieutenant Commander James Charles Johnson, Royal Navy.
- Lieutenant Commander Richard Brian Jones, Royal Navy.
- Lieutenant Commander Christopher Worrall Jordan, Royal Navy.
- Lieutenant Commander Stephen Edward Leggett, Royal Navy.
- Lieutenant Commander Alan Douglas Malcolmson, Royal Navy.
- Warrant Officer Andrew Docherty McDonald.
- Warrant Officer William Joseph McIntosh.
- Warrant Officer Peter Arthur Nicholls.
- Warrant Officer Martin Owen.
- Chief Petty Officer Physical Trainer Victor John Parsons.
- Chief Petty Officer (Operations) (Radar) Neil Richards.
- Warrant Officer Anthony William Leonard Sutherland.
- Chief Petty Officer Marine Engineering Artificer (M) John Houston Tait.
- Lieutenant Derrick Teasdale, Royal Navy.
- Lieutenant Peter Dawson Tomlin, Royal Navy.
- Chief Petty Officer Weapon Engineering Artificer Andrew Michael Wyatt.
- Major Ronald John Aquilina, Royal Tank Regiment.
- Major Sean Robert Armstrong, The Royal Logistic Corps.
- Sergeant Keith Gerald Bailey, Adjutant General's Corps (RMP).
- Major Maurice Francis Barlow, The Royal Logistic Corps.
- Warrant Officer Class 1 William John Barr, Adjutant General's Corps (SPS).
- Sergeant Richard David Dalgarno Brown, The Royal Logistic Corps.
- Major Edward Adam Butler, Royal Green Jackets.
- Major David Thomas Cartwright, Adjutant General's Corps (ETS).
- Warrant Officer Class 2 Michael Ian Collarbone, Corps of Royal Engineers.
- Captain Jonathan Russell Crouch, BEM, The Royal Logistic Corps.
- Warrant Officer Class 1 Philip Andrew Cutforth, Royal Corps of Signals.
- Sergeant Philip Thomas Da Vies, Royal Corps of Signals.
- Warrant Officer Class 1 Colin Dorning, Army Physical Training Corps.
- Major Simon Charles Freeland, Corps of Royal Engineers.
- Major Guy Russel John Glanville, The Royal Gurkha Rifles.
- Lieutenant Colonel Brian Greaves, Corps of Royal Electrical and Mechanical Engineers.
- Warrant Officer Class 2 Stuart Lochrey Guest, Intelligence Corps.
- Warrant Officer Class 1 Omparkash Gurung, Queen's Gurkha Signals.
- Warrant Officer Class 2 (Acting Warrant Officer Class 1) Richard Hallam, Corps of Royal Electrical and Mechanical Engineers.
- Major William Gerald Herlihy, Army Air Corps.
- Major Barry James Hill, Adjutant General's Corps (ETS).
- Corporal Richard Francis Hirst, Corps of Royal Engineers.
- Staff Sergeant Bruce Howard Hobday, Corps of Royal Electrical and Mechanical Engineers.
- Major Ian Andrew Horn, Army Physical Training Corps.
- Corporal Danny Huddart, Corps of Royal Engineers.
- Warrant Officer Class 1 Michael Brian Hunt, The Royal Logistic Corps.
- Warrant Officer Class 2 Robert Ingham, Royal Corps of Signals.
- Major Roland John Ladley, The Royal Anglian Regiment.
- Major David Neal Lambert, The Parachute Regiment.
- Major Allan Hugh Leeson, The Royal Logistic Corps, Territorial Army.
- Major John Gordon Lorimer, The Parachute Regiment.
- Acting Captain Charles Macdonald, The Black Watch Battalion Army Cadet Force.
- Lieutenant David Russell Matthews, The Light Infantry.
- Major Ian Ronald McAlister, The Argyll and Sutherland Highlanders.
- Staff Sergeant Thomas McKay, The Royal Logistic Corps, Territorial Army.
- Warrant Officer Class 2 Brian Milne, The Parachute Regiment.
- Major Thomas Newton Mouat, The Royal Logistic Corps.
- Warrant Officer Class 1 Michael Charles Newsome, The Royal Logistic Corps.
- Major Robert Alfred Peedle, TD, Adjutant General's Corps (RMP), Territorial Army.
- Lieutenant Colonel Robert Plenderleith, Corps of Royal Engineers.
- Lieutenant Colonel David Ian Richardson, The Duke of Wellington's Regiment.
- Acting Captain Beryl Ann Shanahan, Shropshire Army Cadet Force.
- Major William Michael Sharpe, The Devonshire and Dorset Regiment.
- Colour Sergeant Roger Nigel Smith, The Green Howards.
- Major James William Storey, TD, JP, Adjutant General's Corps (SPS), Territorial Army.
- Warrant Officer Class 1 Gary Thompson, BEM, Adjutant General's Corps (SPS).
- Major Geoffrey Herbert Thorneycroft, Corps of Royal Engineers.
- Major David Hugh Toler, Coldstream Guards.
- Captain Stephen Wallis, Royal Regiment of Artillery.
- Major James Hilary Ward, Army Air Corps.
- Warrant Officer Class 1 Peter David Woodcock, The Royal Anglian Regiment.
- Squadron Leader Roseanne Allen, Royal Air Force.
- Flight Lieutenant Alec Christopher Ayliffe, Royal Air Force.
- Squadron Leader Peter Charles Banks, Royal Air Force.
- Chief Technician Andrew Michael Borsden, Royal Air Force.
- Squadron Leader Nigel George Branston, Royal Air Force.
- Sergeant Ian David Clarke, Royal Air Force.
- Warrant Officer Anthony James Dunphy, Royal Air Force.
- Sergeant (now Chief Technician) Stephen James Durrant, Royal Air Force.
- Flight Lieutenant James Keith Frampton, Royal Air Force.
- Flight Sergeant Graham John Heywood, Royal Air Force
- Flight Sergeant Kenneth Horner, Royal Air Force.
- Warrant Officer Robert Cecil Hutchinson, Royal Air Force.
- Master Air Loadmaster Gerald Anthony Hynes, Royal Air Force.
- Flight Lieutenant (now Squadron Leader) Mark Harry Michael Kemsley, Royal Air Force.
- Flight Sergeant John David King, Royal Air Force
- Warrant Officer Patrick Hugh Martin, Royal Air Force.
- Warrant Officer John Hugh May, B.E.M., Royal Air Force.
- Squadron Leader Ian Robert McNee, Royal Air Force.
- Warrant Officer David William Morgan, B.E.M., Royal Air Force.
- Flight Lieutenant Mark Jonathan Northover, Royal Air Force.
- Warrant Officer Adrian Peter Rawle, B.E.M., Royal Air Force.
- Chief Technician Philip Royle, Royal Air Force.
- Chief Technician David Sanderson, Royal Air Force.
- Warrant Officer Patrick Sweeney, Royal Air Force.
- Squadron Leader Lawrence John Trask, Royal Air Force.
- Squadron Leader Richard Donald Arthur Tulloch, Royal Air Force.
- Sergeant Andrew Wardley, Royal Air Force (Retired).
- Warrant Officer William White, Royal Air Force.
- Warrant Officer Keith Wilson, Royal Air Force
- Sergeant Paul Mark Wilson, Royal Air Force.

Civil Division

- Kathleen Grace, Mrs Aaronricks, For services to the Soldiers', Sailors' and Airmen's Association in Canterbury, Kent.
- Margaret Irene, Mrs Adair. For services to Tourism.
- Alan Adams, Superintendent, Marshall of Cambridge Aerospace Ltd. For services to the Defence Industry and to Training.
- George Mervyn Adams, lately Chief Janitor/Security Officer, Glasgow Caledonian University. For services to Higher Education.
- Irene Emily, Mrs Adkins. For services to Young People in Rugby, Warwickshire.
- Sulakshan Kumar Aeri, Surveyor, London Airports, Her Majesty's Customs and Excise.
- Joyce Margaret, Mrs Aldridge. For services to the community in Woodcote, South Oxfordshire.
- Gloria Linda, Mrs Alldridge, Manager, Welsh National Poisons Unit. For services to Health and Safety in Wales and in West England.
- Miss Vivienne Anderson. For services to the community.
- Alan Sydney Anthony. For services to the Quarrying Industry.
- Matthew David Anthony. For services to Agriculture.
- Thomas Gwyn Anthony. For services to Agriculture.
- Michael Antony Frank Ashfield, chairman, India Research Group. For services to Export.
- Jennifer Dorothy, Mrs Backshell. For services to the Engineering and Physical Sciences Research Council.
- Beryl Joan, Mrs Baddeley. For services to Scouting and to the community in Willenhall, Wolverhampton.
- Sandra Mary, Mrs Baddeley, Museum Administrator, Royal Doulton plc. For services to the China Industry.
- Myles Wayne Bagnall, Director, Bagnall Group Ltd. For services to the Building Industry.
- David Thomas Bailey, Management Pay Band 6, Employment Service, Department for Education and Employment.
- Gillian Mary, Mrs Baker. For services to Salisbury-Sudan Medical Link.
- James Baldock, lately Support Grade 2, Department of the Environment.
- Patricia Mary, Mrs Barber, Senior Personal Secretary, Treasury Solicitor's Department.
- Dominic Barclay, Vice-chairman, Dumfries and Galloway Health Council. For services to the community in Kirconnel.
- Daniel Barr. For services to Scouting in Dunfermline, Fife.
- Roger Stanley Barton, lately Health, Safety and Security Manager, Essex and Suffolk Water. For services to the Water Industry.
- Iris, Mrs Bateman, lately Administrative Officer, Department of the Environment.
- Philip James Bates, lately Acting Chief Fire Officer, Derbyshire Fire and Rescue Service. For services to the Fire Service.
- Indira, Mrs Batra. For services to the Asian community in Hyndburn, Lancashire.
- Susan Helen Frances, Mrs Batten. For services to the community, particularly the RNLI, in Sherborne, Dorset.
- Walter Freeman Beattie, Inspector, Fishmongers' Company. For services to Salmon Fisheries in Scotland.
- Miss Julia Victoria Beck. For services to the community in Lancaster.
- Miss Mary Brookhouse Belcher. For services to the Institute of Agricultural Secretaries and Administrators.
- Arthur Edward Irving Bell, chairman, Westerkirk Parish Library Trust. For services to the community in Langholm, Dumfries.
- Roy Malcolm Bell, Manager, Signal and Telecommunications, Railtrack plc. For services to the Railway Industry.
- Violet Isabella, Mrs Bell. For services to the community.
- Violet Bertha, Mrs Bellamy, Administrative Officer, Companies House, Department of Trade and Industry.
- Cynthia Betty Joan, Mrs Bennett. For services to the West Dorset Accordion Group.
- John Albert Bennett, Secretary General, Association of Independent Research and Technology Organisation. For services to the Technology Industry.
- Robert William Bertram, Assistant Divisional Officer, Lothian and Borders Fire Brigade. For services to the Fire Service and for humanitarian services in Romania.
- John Billington. For services to the Friends of Preston Acute Hospitals NHS Trust, Lancashire.
- Mary Isobel, Mrs Birney, Administrative Officer, Ministry of Defence.
- The Reverend Canon Neville Black. For services to the community in Liverpool, Merseyside.
- Susan Peggy, Mrs Blackett. For services to the International League for the Protection of Horses.
- Simon Paul Blagden, chairman, Quante Group UK. For services to Export.
- Paul Mervyn Blake. For services to the Acorn Trust, Canterbury, Kent.
- Jack Ralph Blanchfield. For scientific services to the Food Industry.
- John Cairns Boag. For services to the community.
- Harry Foster Verity Bolland. For services to the community in Malham, North Yorkshire.
- George Bolton. For services to the Coal Mining Industry in Scotland.
- John Alfred Booth, Manager, Maintenance (Mechanical), Vosper Thornycroft (UK) Ltd. For services to the Defence Industry.
- Serena, Mrs Botterman. For services to the community, particularly Young People, in Greater Manchester.
- Richard Edward Bowater, Honorary Secretary, Society of Clerks of Valuation Tribunals. For services to Valuation Tribunals.
- George Bowers. For services to the Boys Brigade in West Yorkshire.
- Ronald James Bowker. For services to Young People in Croydon, Surrey.
- Marie Patricia, Mrs Boyle. For public service.
- Duncan Grant Bradshaw, Senior Technician, University of Paisley. For services to Education and to Scouting.
- Eric Bradshaw. For services to the War Pensions Committee in Liverpool, Merseyside.
- Colonel John Albert Brake, lately Retired Officer 1, Ministry of Defence.
- Miss Joy Marion Brame, B.E.M. For services to the Bomber Command Association.
- Margaret Audrey, Mrs Brian. For services to the Citizens' Advice Bureau in Cambridge.
- Dorothy, Mrs Brockie, Support Grade 3, Scottish Office.
- Valerie, Mrs Brodie, Head, School of Performing Arts, Rugby College, Warwickshire. For services to Education.
- Hazel, Mrs Brooke, executive director, Scottish Cot Death Trust. For charitable services.
- Edna Barbara, Mrs Brooks, lately Higher Executive Officer, Overseas Development Administration.
- George William Brooks. For services to the community in Sandbach, Cheshire.
- Wendy Lorraine, Mrs Broome, Head of Road Safety, Hertfordshire County Council. For services to Road Safety.
- Dorothy Blanche, Mrs Brown. For services to the Soldiers', Sailors' and Airmen's Association in Shropshire.
- James Patrick Brown. For services to the community in South West London.
- Kathleen, Mrs Brown, Personal Secretary, Department of Social Security.
- Jean Margaret, Mrs Bryden, chairman, Edinburgh Headway Group. For services to Health Care.
- Isobel, Mrs Brydie, For services to the Livingston Development Corporation.
- The Reverend Canon James Frederick Buckett. For services to the community on the Isle of Wight.
- Captain Roy Malcolm Bullen, lately Harbourmaster, Jersey. For services to the community.
- Derek George Burman, lately Senior Professional and Technology Officer, Ministry of Defence.
- Major Robert Mackenzie Burnett. For services to the Army Parachute Association.
- Robert Harold Burns. For services to the Dairy Industry.
- Mary, Mrs Butlin, Customer Service Manager, Her Majesty's Board of Inland Revenue.
- Miss Pamela Mary Cain. For services to the community in Perth.
- Patricia Rosemary, Mrs Carpenter, Administrative Officer. Ministry of Defence.
- Daniel Benedict Carron, chairman, MRI Scanner Appeal, Grimsby Hospital. For services to Health Care.
- Debabrata Chakraborti, Consultant Psychiatrist, King's Lynn, Norfolk. For services to Medicine.
- Norman Chalmers, Caretaker, Taymouth Castle, Kenmore. For services to Conservation.
- Ronald McPherson Chalmers, Master baker. For services to the Baking Industry in Aberdeenshire.
- Mary Jane, Mrs Chambers. For services to the community in Thamesmead, London.
- Christine, Mrs Charlton. For services to the community in Tollerton, York.
- Margaret Olive, Mrs Chilcott. For services to the WRVS in Swansea.
- Margaret, Mrs Child. For services to Relate in Lowestoft, Suffolk and Great Yarmouth, Norfolk.
- Janet, Mrs Chilvers, Administrative Officer, Ministry of Defence.
- John William Chipperfield. For services to Journalism and to the community in Oxford.
- Robert Lowe Christie, lately Director of Television, Grampian Television plc. For services to Broadcasting.
- Tony Luk Wah Chu, President, North East Chinese Association. For services to Community Relations.
- Thomas William Churchill. For services to Disabled Mineworkers.
- John Henry Clapson, Ambulance Paramedic, Deal, Kent. For services to Health Care.
- Miss Constance Enid Clark. For services to the Royal Air Forces Association in Sussex.
- David Alexander Clark, lately Chief Superintendent, National Secretary, Police Superintendents' Association of England and Wales. For services to the Police.
- Miss Linda Geraldine Clark. For services to the Environment.
- Peter Clark, Field Engineer. For humanitarian services in the former Yugoslavia.
- Miss Marjorie Sybil Cleaver, Member, Housing Centre Trust. For services to Housing.
- Robert Clement. For services to the community in Bongate, Darlington, County Durham.
- John William Cload, Key keeper, Martello Tower. For services to Conservation.
- Miss Deanna Coates. For services to Air Rifle Shooting for People with Disabilities.
- Madeline Avis, Mrs Coffin, Ward Manager, Grantham Hospital NHS Trust, Lincolnshire. For services to Health Care.
- Hilda, Mrs Cohen. For services to Magistracy in Cardiff.
- Mary, Mrs Conlon. For services to Children with Disabilities.
- Jeanette Joan, Mrs Connor, Personal Secretary, Her Majesty's Board of Inland Revenue.
- David Eliot Cook, Specialist Investigator, Her Majesty's Customs and Excise.
- Raymond Cook, Leader, Rushcliffe Borough Council. For services to the community in Rushcliffe, Nottinghamshire.
- Ernest William Cooke. For services to the community in Alphington, Devon.
- John Wallace Cormack, Lecturer in Mathematics, Cardonald College. For services to Education.
- Stephen Anthony Costello. For services to Education and Training.
- Vanda Alexandra Clare, Lady Cotterell. For charitable services to the community in Hereford and Worcester.
- Evonne Leonora, Mrs Von Heussen-Countryman. For services to the Victims of Stalking and Harassment.
- Sister Mary Anthony Coyle, Headteacher, St Patrick's Primary School, Greenock. For services to Education.
- Stephen Willard Cracknell, Detective Constable, Metropolitan Police. For services to the Police.
- Andrew Crawford. For services to Education.
- Sister Winifred Mary Crawford, Sessional Chaplaincy Assistant, Her Majesty's Prison Blundeston. For Services to Prisoner Welfare.
- John William Croft. For services to the Lower Wensleydale Young Farmers Club, North Yorkshire.
- Edith, Mrs Crook, lately Receptionist and Telephonist. For services to the North British Housing Association.
- Margaret, Mrs Crosbie. For services to Tourism in Dumfries and Galloway.
- Leonard George Crump, Train Crew Manager, London Underground Ltd. For services to Public Transport in London.
- Michael Joseph Cullen. For public service.
- Bridget, Mrs Cumiskey, Chief Housing Benefits Officer, London Borough of Camden. For services to Housing.
- The Reverend Ian Samuel Currie, chairman, Victim Support Scotland. For charitable services.
- Ronald Curry, Cinema Projectionist. For services to Film History and the community in Doncaster.
- Clifford Roy Cuthbert. For services to the Royal Air Forces Association in Wales.
- James Dalgleish, Planning Foreman, Scottish Office.
- Esther Mary, Mrs Daly, Support Grade 2, Department of the Environment.
- Laurette Valentine, Mrs Danson. For services to the Soldiers' Sailors' and Airmen's Families Association in Clwyd.
- Miss Sheena Mairi McKinnon Darroch, lately Executive Officer, UK Passport Agency, Home Office.
- Christine Marigold, Mrs Davenport. For charitable services to the community in the West Midlands.
- Brian Wemyss Davidson, deputy director, Outer Area, Commonwealth War Graves Commission.
- John Stanley Davies. For services to the Fishguard Music Festival.
- Meirion Wyn Davies, lately Conservator, Mid Wales, Forestry Commission.
- Robert William Davies, Director of International Marketing, Target Technology Ltd. For services to the Unmanned Air Vehicle Industry.
- Alfred Davis, Rail Operator, Great North Eastern Railway Ltd. For services to Public Transport.
- Caroline Lissa Angelo, Mrs Davis, lately Arboriculturist, Department of the Environment.
- Elizabeth Mary, Mrs Davis. For services to the community in Rugeley, Staffordshire.
- Yvonne, Mrs Dawe, National Training Programmes Manager, Remploy. For services to Training and to Disabled People in Gwent.
- Charles Dawson, Fisherman. For services to the Fishing Industry in Northumberland.
- John Arnold Dayer. For services to the community in Droitwich Spa, Hereford and Worcester.
- Elizabeth, Mrs Deacon. For services to the community in Tow Law, County Durham.
- Marjorie, Mrs Dean, lately Personal Secretary, Her Majesty's Prison Bullingdon.
- William Coull Deas. For services to the Scottish Fisheries Museum, Anstruther, Fife.
- Michael John Dene. For services to the community on Guernsey, Channel Islands.
- Leslie Alan Dennis, Tourist Guide. For services to Tourism in South East England.
- Albert Duncan Dewar, Trustee, Menzies Charitable Trust. For services to Building Conservation.
- Anna Graham, Mrs Dobson, District Organiser, WRVS in Midlothian. For services to the community.
- Harold Dodds. For services to the Dairy Industry.
- Margaretta Fidelis, Mrs Doran. For services to the Arts.
- Joanne, Mrs Dormer. For services to the community in North East London.
- Dorothy, Mrs Dowling. For services to the National Blood Service.
- Tony William Edwin Downes, lately Group Director, Environmental Engineering, Variety Perkins Group Ltd. For services to Technology.
- William Drummond, Superintendent, Fife Constabulary. For services to the Police.
- Mary Geary, Mrs Dudgeon. For services to the community in Sutherland.
- Winifred Stewart, Mrs Duncan, lately Higher Executive Officer, Department of Social Security.
- The Reverend Canon John Barry Eardley, Diocesan Director of Education, Church of England Diocese of Coventry. For services to Education.
- Joan, Mrs Eden, lately Secretary to the Director, Planning and Transportation, Leicestershire County Council. For services to Local Government.
- Cyril Edgar. For services to the Army Cadet Force, Northumberland.
- Paul Martin Edwards, vice-president, and General Manager UK Operations, Genzyme. For services to the Biotechnology Industry.
- Vernon John Tamplin Edwards, Town Clerk, Caldicot, Monmouthshire. For services to the community.
- Ronald Eric Eley. For services to the Clydach Hospital League of Friends, Swansea.
- Miss Ann Rosa Elton, Macmillan Nurse, St Peter's Hospital NHS Trust, Surrey. For services to Health Care.
- Joy Freda, Mrs Epton. For services to the Girls Friendly Society.
- Lynne Avril, Mrs Evans. For services to Archery.
- Marcia Gloria Davies, Mrs Ewart, Headteacher, The Drive Primary School, Gateshead, Tyne and Wear. For services to Education.
- Sister Mary Carmel Fanning. For services to Education.
- Stanley Thomas Fearne, Administrative Officer, Her Majesty's Customs and Excise.
- Miss Janice Finestone. For humanitarian services in Croatia.
- Ethel, Mrs Fisher. For services to the community in Seaton, Cumbria.
- Stanley Fitches. For services to the British Red Cross Society.
- Frederick William Flemen, Inspector, Immigration Service, Home Office.
- Peter George Fletcher. For services to the British Nuclear Test Veterans' Association.
- Dennis Newton Flower, lately Operations Director, Confederation of Passenger Transport UK. For services to Public Transport.
- Miss Valerie Jane Fone, Chief Accountant, Central Board of Finance. For services to the Church of England.
- Major James Andrew Forsythe, T.D. For services to Maritime Conservation.
- Elsie Margarete, Mrs Fountain, Administrative Assistant, Her Majesty's Customs and Excise.
- Thomas Arthur Benjamin France. For services to the Afro-Caribbean community in Leeds.
- Malcolm Franks, Chief Executive, British Quality Foundation. For services to Industry.
- Miss Ruth Harriet Frizzelle. For services to the community in Maulden, Bedfordshire.
- Patricia Agnes, Mrs Gardiner, lately Senior Personal Secretary, Department of Health.
- Terence Peter Gardner, Sergeant, Dyfed-Powys Police. For services to the community in Dyfed.
- David Frederick Gaskell, Consultant Psychiatrist, Argyll and Bute NHS Trust. For services to Medicine.
- Pauline Cynthia, Mrs George. For services to the community in Kettering, Northamptonshire.
- David Getty. For services to the Fire Service.
- Avrille Mary, Mrs Gibberd. For services to Relate in Basingstoke, Hampshire.
- Miss Anne Grosvenor Gibbs. For services to the British Polio Fellowship in Wolverhampton and the West Midlands.
- Gerald Glanvtlle. For services to Elderly People in Thorveton, Devon.
- Lesley Scott Dent, Mrs Glasser, Director, Science and Technology Regional Organisation, North Scotland. For services to Science and Engineering.
- Richard John Goodridge, Post Man. For services to the Post Office and to the community in Carmarthen, Dyfed.
- Patricia Mary, Mrs Gordon. For services to the community in Skye and Lochalsh.
- Cassandra Paxton, Mrs Graham, Personal Executive Secretary, Department of Social Security.
- David Alexander Grant, managing director, Highland Stoneware. For services to the Tableware Industry.
- James Melville Arthur Gray. For services to the community in Linlithgow, West Lothian.
- Ernest Wilfred Gray, General Manager, Palatine Products. For services to the Employment of Disabled People.
- John Howard Green. For services to the Pahar Trust.
- Miss Patricia Honor Greene (Mrs Richardson), Actor. For services to Radio Drama.
- Albert Frederick James Greenwood, Butler, Senior Common Room. For services to Trinity College, University of Oxford.
- Robert Greig, chairman, Whitfield Crime Prevention Panel. For services to the community in Dundee.
- Bertram John Grey. For services to the Bekonscot Model Village, Buckinghamshire.
- Edwin Richard Griffiths. For services to the Royal British Legion in York.
- Colin Grimshaw, Member, Board of Visitors, Her Majesty's Prison Leeds. For services to Prisoner Welfare.
- Christopher John Grove. For services to the West Midlands Police Choir.
- James John Gunning, Honorary Treasurer, British Limbless Ex-Servicemen's Association. For services to the ex-Service Community.
- Beattie, Mrs Hackett. For services to Tourism at Westminster Abbey, London.
- Barbara June, Mrs Hall, Division Commissioner for Guiding, Gosport, Hampshire. For services to Guiding.
- Elizabeth Ann Fosbroke, Mrs Hall, chairperson, Hampshire Mencap Societies. For services to Young People.
- Terence Hall, Chair of Governors, Audenshaw High School, Tameside, Manchester. For services to Education.
- James Hallows. For services to the Royal British Legion in Chester.
- Nancy, Mrs Hamer, Typist, Lord Chancellor's Department.
- James Douglas Hamilton, Strategic Weapon Fire Control Equipment Consultant, GEC Marconi Simulation and Training. For services to the Defence Industry.
- Mary Mrs Hancock, School Crossing Patrol, Birmingham Common, Chesterfield, Derbyshire. For services to Road Safety.
- William Vincent Hanley, Deputy Managing Director, TNT Express (UK) Ltd. For services to the Freight Industry.
- Horace Leslie Harbottle. For services to the community in Minster-in-Thanet, Kent.
- Marlene, Mrs Hargrave. For services to the Arthritis and Rheumatism Council in South East England.
- James Hargreaves, Chief Executive, Training 2000 Ltd, Blackburn, Lancashire. For services to Training.
- James Harrigan, chairman, Glasgow Association of Family Support Groups. For services to the Prevention of Drug Misuse.
- Ada Gertrude Ellen, Mrs Harris. For services to Elderly People in Minehead, Somerset.
- Jeffery John Harris, Business Manager, Electro-Optical Systems, Avimo Ltd. For services to the Defence Industry.
- Vivienne, Mrs Harris. For services to Journalism and to the community in Manchester.
- Terence James Harrison. For services to Sport for People with Disabilities in the East Midlands.
- Terence George Harrop, Advisory and Inspection Manager, Cheshire local Education Authority. For services to Education.
- Miss Avril Daphne Hart, Assistant Curator, Victoria and Albert Museum.
- Miss Marie Hartley. For services to the Culture and History of Yorkshire.
- Miss Gillian Avila Hartnoll, lately Head of Library and Information Services, British Film Institute. For services to Film and Television Culture and to the Film Industry.
- Betty Nanette, Mrs Hatton. For services to the Engineering Council.
- Susan, Mrs Parke-Hatton, Principal Fire Control Officer, Lancashire County Fire Brigade. For services to the Fire Service.
- Roy Lawrence Hawkridge. For services to the community in Highgate, and South Ruislip, Middlesex.
- Kenneth John Haydon. For services to War Disabled People.
- John Michael Hayman, lately Chief Commandant, Leicestershire Special Constabulary. For services to the Police.
- Kenneth James Headspeath, Farm Manager, Glengorm Estate. For services to Agriculture.
- Arthur William Healey, Revenue Collector Customer Service, Seeboard plc. For services to the Electricity Industry and to the community in Kent.
- Raymond Hedgecock. For services to the Submarine Old Comrades' Association in Mersey side.
- Professor Stanley Heptinstall. For services to the community in Bramcote, Nottinghamshire.
- Michael John Rowland Heron, Director, Employment Policy, British Footwear Association. For services to the Footwear Industry.
- Bertha, Mrs Heyes. For services to the League of Friends, St Helens Hospital, Merseyside.
- Stanley Hill. For services to the Royal Tank Regiment Association and to the Territorial Army in Nottingham.
- Frank Hilton, Works Convenor, Dynamics Division, BAe plc. For services to the Defence Industry.
- Karen Maria, Mrs Hilton. For services to Ballroom Dancing.
- Marcus Edward Hilton. For services to Ballroom Dancing.
- David Hiorns, Production Manager, Bruntingthorpe Gravels. For services to the Quarrying Industry.
- Robert George Hitchings, Quality Assurance Manager, Remploy. For services to the Employment of Disabled People in Bristol.
- Christopher Beauchamp Hobart. For services to the community, particularly Young People, in Oxfordshire.
- Charles Arthur Hogg, lately Director, NEWVOL (North East Wales Voluntary Services Council). For services to the community in Clwyd.
- Miss Anne Holmes. For services to Music in Grimsby, Lincolnshire.
- Richard Holmes. For services to the Royal British Legion.
- Muriel Semple, Mrs Holroyd, Clinical Nurse Manager, Greater Glasgow Health Board. For services to Health Care.
- Margaret Joan, Mrs Hood. For services to the British Red Cross Society in East Sussex.
- Doreen Frances, Mrs How, Administrative Officer, Highways Agency, Department of Transport.
- Margaret Anita, Mrs Howells. For services to the Citizens' Advice Bureau in Radnor, Powys.
- Ethel Maud, Mrs Huggard. For charitable services in South Wales.
- Margaret, Mrs Humes. For services to Health Care.
- Elizabeth Junia, Mrs Humphreys. For services to Elderly People.
- Myrtle Joan, Mrs Hurrell. For services to the National Schizophrenia Fellowship in Welwyn Garden City, Hertfordshire.
- Patricia, Mrs Hutchinson. For services to the Citizens' Advice Bureau Movement.
- Miss Joan Alicia Ingilby. For services to the Culture and History of Yorkshire.
- Nikos Ioannides, lately Chief Security Force Police Officer, Ministry of Defence.
- Carolyn Margery, Mrs Ireland. For services to the Alzheimer's Disease Society in Guildford, Surrey.
- Peter Jackman. For services to the Royal Star and Garter Home, Richmond, Surrey.
- Denis William Jackson, lately Office Services Supervisor, British Waterways. For services to British Waterways.
- Michael Charles Jackson, Superintendent, Essex Police. For services to the Police and to the community in Harlow.
- Charles Frederick Jago. For services to the Ex-prisoners of War Association.
- Shirley, Mrs James. For charitable services to the community in Aberdare, South Wales.
- Lester Percy Jarvis. For services to the Elderly and Disabled People and to the Royal British Legion in Tingewick, Buckingham.
- Cynthia, Mrs Jeffery, School Crossing Patrol Warden, Devon County Council. For services to Road Safety.
- Margaret McCarter Jervis. For services to the community in the Rhondda Valley.
- Sarah Janet, Mrs Johnston, Manager, Dover Counselling Centre. For services to the Shipping Industry and to Counselling.
- David Johnstone, Linesman, Scottish Hydro-Electric. For services to the Electricity Industry.
- Irene Gillan, Mrs Joly. For services to the Hampshire Probation Service.
- John Thomas Henry Jones. For services to Coventry and Warwickshire Chamber of Commerce and Industry.
- Maurice Jones, lately Director, Leicester Victims of Crime Support Scheme. For services to Victim Support.
- Thomas Owen Jones. For services to Local Government in Wales.
- Robert Stanley Jordan, Door Keeper, 10 Downing Street.
- Barry Richard Joyce. For services to Architectural Conservation in Derbyshire.
- Kanwarjit Singh Juj, Sub-Post Master. For services to the Post Office and for charitable services in London.
- Bernard Kashket, Tailor. For services to the Armed Forces.
- Lilian, Mrs Kearns. For services to the community on the Johnson Fold Estate, Bolton, Lancashire.
- Helen Ruth, Mrs Kegie. For services to the Housing Association Movement in South East Wales.
- Dorothy Margaret, Mrs Kelly. For charitable service to the community on the Isle of Man.
- Patrick Joseph Kelly, Driver, Ministry of Defence.
- Peter Gordon Kelly, General Medical Practitioner, Gloucestershire. For services to Medicine.
- Avis Anne, Mrs Kennedy, Personal Assistant to the Director, Northumbria Region, National Trust. For services to Conservation.
- Josephine Kennedy. For services to Childminding in Scotland.
- Jean Gilchrist, Mrs Keppie. For services to the Guide Association.
- George William Kerrison. For services to the community in North Elmham, Norfolk.
- Pamela Glennis, Mrs Kerry, Personnel Manager, Her Majesty's Treasury.
- Joseph Kersh. For services to the South Shields Kidney Research Fund.
- Hazel Janice, Mrs Brownlie-Kind, Higher Executive Officer, Her Majesty's Young Offenders' Institution Feltham.
- Lesley Diane, Mrs King, Headteacher, St Joseph's Roman Catholic Grant Maintained Primary School, Aldershot, Hampshire. For services to Education.
- James Kinnin, Coxswain, Ramsey Lifeboat, Isle of Man. For services to Safety at Sea.
- Peter Evert Kinton, County Vice-president, Greater London South West, Scout Association. For services to Scouting.
- Joan Margaret, Mrs Kirby. For services to the community in Leatherhead, Surrey.
- Miss Jennifer Maureen Lansdown, Assistant Accountant, House of Lords.
- Jack Donald Layers. For services to the community in Newchurch, Isle of Wight.
- Peter Oliver Lavery. For public Service.
- Samuel John Lavery, lately Senior Executive Officer, Department of Social Security.
- David Lea, lately Member, North East Regional Board, Scottish Natural Heritage. For services to the Environment.
- Herbert Lealman. For services to the community in Huttons Ambo, Yorkshire.
- Pamela Anne, Mrs Lee. For services to Riding in the Countryside.
- John Michael Leeder, chairman, Diss Crime Prevention Panel, Norfolk. For services to Crime Prevention.
- W. Richard Leese. For services to the community in Trent Vale, Staffordshire.
- Miss Bronwen Lewis. For services to the Save the Children Fund in Iraq.
- Thomas Ridley Lewis, Member, Sefton Metropolitan Borough Council. For services to the community in Sefton, Merseyside.
- Sheelagh Mary, Mrs Linton. For services to the Cancer Research Campaign in Girvan, Ayrshire.
- Eric Littler. For services to the Boys Brigade in St Helen's, Merseyside.
- Vernon Llewellyn. For services to the community in Rhiwbina, Cardiff.
- Graham Malcolm Lloyd, Investment Administration Manager, Smiths Industries plc. For services to Pension Investment.
- William James Logan. For services to Education.
- Margaret Mary, Mrs Loran. For services to Business and to the community in Cheshire.
- Geoffrey Donald Lord. For services to the community in Piddlehinton, Dorset.
- Helen Dawson, Mrs Love. For services to the community in Motherwell and Wishaw.
- Anthony Lowe, lately Director, Merseyside Training and Enterprise Council. For services to Training and to Industry.
- Charles Brian Lowe. For services to Architecture.
- Norman Lowe. For services to Post Office and Civil Service Sanatorium Society.
- Barbara Joan, Mrs Lowndes. For services to the Community Association Movement.
- Geoffrey Loyd. For services to the Speciality Food and Drink Industry.
- Amy Elizabeth, Mrs Luce. For services to Music on Jersey, Channel Islands.
- George Rodney Lurring. For services to the Police.
- Angus Macdonald. For services to Agricultural Journalism.
- Judith Mary, Mrs Macdonald, Local Officer 1, Department of Social Security.
- Margaret Jean, Mrs Macdonald, Consultant Ophthalmologist and Clinical Director, Queen Margaret Hospital, Dunfermline. For services to Medicine.
- William Robert Mackenzie, Crofter. For services to Agriculture.
- Alastair Ian Maclean, Retained Sub-Officer, Strathclyde Fire Brigade. For services to the Fire Service and to the community.
- John Patrick Maclean, Coxswain Mechanic, Oban Lifeboat. For services to Safety at Sea.
- John Macleod. For services to the Skye Mountain Rescue Team.
- Richard Lloyd McMillan, Roadman for the A82 from Inverness to Fort Augustus. For services to Road Safety and to the Environment.
- Faye MacRory, Midwife. For services to Health Care in Manchester.
- Thomas Angus Mack, D.L. For services to the Scout Association in Menstrie, Clackmannan.
- Melvin Magnall. For services to the community in Bury, Greater Manchester.
- William Stanley Magowan. For services to the Association of British Travel Agents in North West England.
- Malachy Raymond Mahon. For services to Economic Development.
- John Cyril Malfait. For services to Cricket in Northamptonshire.
- Richard Henry Keeling Mann, lately Fish Biologist, Institute of Freshwater Ecology. For services to Fish Ecology.
- Father Francis Maple. For charitable services.
- Alan Edward Marks, Finance Business Manager, the National Grid Company plc. For services to the Electricity Industry.
- Gerald Marley, Secretary, Campsie Black Watch Football Club. For services to Youth Football in Scotland.
- Roy Cyril Massey, Organist, Hereford Cathedral. For services to Music.
- Irene, Mrs Matthew, lately Higher Executive Officer, Welsh Office.
- George Anthony Matthews, Electrical Foreman, VSEL. For services to the Defence Industry.
- Marion, Mrs Appleby-Matthews, President, Tamworth Ladies' Lifeboat Guild, Staffordshire.
- Robert Matthews, Auxiliary Coastguard in Charge, Her Majesty's Coastguard. For services to Safety at Sea.
- Joseph Mattiello. For services to the community in Newton South Aston, Birmingham.
- Joyce Mary, Mrs Maxwell. For services to the War Widows' Association.
- Paul Yogi Mayer. For services to the Bradians Association and to Young People.
- Jean Katherine Bundy, Mrs McCallum. For services to the Sheltered Housing and Workshop Project in North East England.
- Audrey, Mrs McClean. For services to Education.
- Margaret Stewart, Mrs McConnell. For services to the Arthritis and Rheumatism Council in Scotland.
- William Charles McConnell. For services to Local History and to the community.
- Lila, Mrs McCoy. For services to the community.
- Ian Gordon McCreath. For services to the community in Berwick-upon-Tweed, Northumberland.
- George Moodie McCrone, Divisional Commander, Cumbria Constabulary. For services to the Police.
- Patrick McDermott. For services to Young People.
- William Joseph Speedy McDowell. For services to Education.
- Jean, Mrs McEvoy. For services to Prisoner Welfare at Her Majesty's Prison Preston.
- George McFall. For services to Elderly People.
- James Alexander McFinnell, Pensions Policy director, Railways Pension Trustee Company Ltd. For services to the Railway Industry.
- Mary Helen, Mrs McKinney. For services to the British Diabetic Association.
- Miss Catherine Williamina Harvie McLachlan, lately Administrative Officer, Health and Safety Executive, Department of the Environment.
- Margaret Tait, Mrs McLaren. For services to the community in Newtonmore, Inverness.
- Bridget Rachel, Mrs McMurray. For services to the Not Forgotten Association.
- Francis Michael NcNamara, lately Management Pay Band 2, Employment Service, Department for Education and Employment.
- John Kennedy McSherrie, Member, Freetown Society, Kingston-upon-Hull. For services to the community in Hull.
- John McVitty. For public service.
- Jeanne, Mrs Mellor, Pay Band 8, Employment Service, Department for Education and Employment.
- Claudette Rosanne, Mrs Meredith. For services to Riding for the Disabled Association (RDA), in Chipping Norton, Oxfordshire, and Stow-on-the-Wold, Gloucestershire.
- Miss Alice Middleton, Officer-in-charge, Warwick House Respite Care Centre, Birmingham. For services to Health Care.
- Brian Middleton, lately member, Sutton on Sea Town Council, Lincolnshire. For services to Local Government and to the community.
- Miss Carole Ann Middleton. For services to Dietetics.
- Barbara Joyce, Mrs Miles. For services to the community in Meadowlands, Cambridge.
- Keith Millanaise, lately Support Grade 2, Home Office.
- John George Lindsay Milne, Head of Training, Approved Driving Instructors National Joint Council. For services to Driving and to Road Safety.
- Yvonne Victoria, Mrs Milne, President, UK Rett Syndrome Association. For services to Health Care.
- Jeannette, Mrs Mitchell, Supervisor, Milldam Coffee Shop, University of Portsmouth, Hampshire. For services to Education.
- Alison, Mrs Moffat. For services to Elderly People and to the British Red Cross in Berwickshire.
- Miss Pamela Moffatt, chair, The Advisory Panel to the London Committee on Accessible Transport. For services to the Mobility of Disabled People.
- Govindaraj Mohan, General Medical Practitioner, Suffolk. For services to Medicine.
- George William Guthrie Montgomery. For services to the Donaldson Trust, Edinburgh and to Deaf People.
- David Harry George Moody, lately Controller, Vehicle Inspection Services, the Freight Transport Association. For services to the Freight Industry.
- Ian Jeremy Moore, Constable, Avon and Somerset Constabulary. For services to the community and to the Police.
- Geoffrey Moralee. For services to Music in Lincoln.
- Wilfrid Farrington Moreton. For services to Campanology.
- Margaret, Mrs Morgan, Headteacher, Cornist Park County Primary School, Flint. For services to Education.
- Raymond Stanley Morgan, lately managing director, SIMS Medical Distribution Ltd. For services to Export.
- Richard Morgan. For services to the community in the Rhondda Valley.
- Eileen Gertrude, Mrs Morley. For services to the community in Fetcham, Surrey.
- Paul Morron, assistant director of Social Work, Criminal Justice Services, City of Glasgow. For services to Social Care Provision.
- Miss June-Etta Morris, Secretary to the Director, CAMPUS, University of Salford. For services to Education and to the community.
- Douglas Morrison, Forwarder Operator, Forestry Commission.
- Frank Mortimer. For services to Disabled People in Southampton, Hampshire.
- Miss Diana Priscilla Moule, Day Care Services Manager, Glanrhyd Hospital, Bridgend. For services to Nursing in Wales.
- Kevin Brian Mulhern. For services to Broadcasting for Disabled People.
- Joyce Winifred, Mrs Munden, Publications Officer, Institute of Arable Crop Research. For services to Arable Crop Research.
- James Buckley Murphy. For services to the St John Ambulance Brigade in Wales.
- Brian Murray, Pay Band 8, Employment Service, Department for Education and Employment.
- William Neill. For services to Association Football and for charitable services.
- Robert Ferguson Nelson, Operations Manager, Vehicle Inspectorate Executive Agency, Department of Transport.
- Miss Mary Josephine Newing, Executive Editor, Dental Practice. For services to the Dental Profession.
- Marion Irene, Mrs Newns, lately Senior Personal Secretary, Mer Majesty's Board of Inland Revenue.
- Valerie Mary, Mrs Newton. For humanitarian services in Eastern Europe.
- William Rex Newton. For humanitarian services in Eastern Europe.
- Andrew Sinclair Nicol, Member, Lochaber Mountain Rescue Association. For services to Mountain Rescue.
- Miss Margaret Marion Craig Nisbet. For services to the community and to Ladies Hockey in Essex.
- Tryphena Amelia Clarke, Mrs Nixon, musical director, New Kilpatrick Singers, Glasgow. For services to Music.
- Arthur Norburn. For services to Rotherham Hospitals, South Yorkshire.
- Doreen, Mrs Norris, Paediatric Senior Staff Nurse, Lewisham Hospitals Trust, London. For services to Health Care.
- Francis John North, lately Chief Clerk, Romford County Court, Lord Chancellor's Department.
- Brian Michael O'Boyle, Senior Professional and Technology Officer, House of Commons.
- Father Eamonn O'Brien. For services to the community.
- Wilfred John O'Reilly. For services to Short Track Speed Skating.
- Alison Mary, Mrs Oldland. For services to the Living Paintings Trust.
- Irene Jean, Mrs Orr, Auxiliary Nurse, Department of Clinical Oncology, Western General Hospital, Edinburgh. For services to Health Care.
- Thomas George Osmond. For services to Wildlife Conservation in Berkshire.
- Dora Margaret, Mrs Pain. For services to the community in Wollaton, Nottinghamshire.
- Maureen Beatrice, Mrs Pallett, Personal Secretary, Government Office for the West Midlands, Department of Trade and Industry.
- Ethna, Mrs Palmer. For services to Industry.
- Nalinikant Tribhovandas Pandya. For services to the community in Brent, London.
- Roland John Parker. For services to the community, particularly Sport, in Pudsey, West Yorkshire.
- James Swithin Parkes. For services to the Duke of Edinburgh's Award Scheme in the Midlands.
- Robert Parkinson, Officer, Safety and Analytical Services, British Nuclear Fuels plc. For services to Employee Relations.
- Lily, Mrs Parrington. For services to the community in Great Glen, Leicestershire.
- Patricia Anne, Mrs Parry, Administrative Officer, Ministry of Defence.
- Jean Margaret, Mrs Patchett, Chief Steward, Ministry of Defence.
- Ian Richard Paterson, Estate Manager, Surrey Police. For services to the Police.
- Francis Joseph Patiniott, General Medical Practitioner, Cheshire. For services to Medicine.
- Bernard Patterson. For services to the Sea Cadet Corps in Birmingham.
- Miss Alma S. Pawson. For services to the community in Braemar, Aberdeenshire.
- Miss Patricia Pearce, Cabin Services Director, British Airways. For charitable services.
- Edwin Pearson, Member, East Rudham Parish Council, Norfolk. For services to the community.
- Derek Pereira, Senior Engineering Officer, British Airways. For charitable services.
- Mary Langley, Mrs Perrens. For services to the W.R.V.S. in East Sussex.
- David Cyril Perry. For services to the community in Rochford, Essex.
- Kenneth Carol Ferryman, Q.F.S.M. For services to the Regional Burns Centre, Pinderfields Hospital, Wakefield.
- Edward John Peterson. For services to Baseball in Wales.
- David Alan Petherbridge. For services to Judo.
- David John Pettitt, Manager, Business Support, Lloyd's of London. For services to the Insurance Industry.
- John Edward Pickworth, Chief Surveyor, Ordnance Survey, Department of the Environment.
- Eric Allen Pinhorne, Higher Industrial Craftsman, Her Majesty's Prison Kingston.
- Patricia, Mrs Ponniah, Administrative Officer, Home Office.
- Patricia Hilda, Mrs Pope, lately School Crossing Patrol, Handbridge, Chester. For services to Road Safety.
- John Godfrey Porter, chairman, Witham Third District Internal Drainage Board. For services to Land Drainage in Lincolnshire.
- Joseph Potts. For services to Forestry in North England.
- James Frederick Horace Powell, D.S.M. For services to the Sea Cadet Corps in Wallsend, Tyne and Wear.
- John Sidney Powell, Voluntary Observer, Swansea. For services to the Meteorological Office.
- Donald Frederick Powley. For services to the British Limbless Ex-Servicemen's Association in Great Yarmouth and Lowestoft, Norfolk.
- Barry Price, lately Senior Prison Officer, Her Majesty's Prison Shrewsbury.
- Miss Vivienne Lola Price. For services to the National Children's Orchestra.
- Christopher Robert Privett, Senior Professional and Technology Officer, Ministry of Defence.
- Victor Ernest Pullen. For charitable services in Dorchester, Dorset.
- Mollie, Mrs Purse. For services to the community in Evercreech, Somerset.
- John Kinross Purser. For services to the community in Middlesex and Surrey.
- Alfred Brian Quinn. For services to the Probation Service in Powys.
- Harold Vernon Radcliffe, Voluntary Observer, Nottinghamshire. For services to the Meteorological Office.
- Joyce Eileen, Mrs Radley. For services to the community in Market Lavington, Wiltshire.
- John Ramage, Convenor, Scottish Association of Health Councils. For services to Health Care.
- Robert Ramsey. For services to the Post Office.
- Douglas Philip Rayfield. For services to the Royal National Institute for the Blind in Surrey.
- Vincent Rea, Founder and lately Director, Bede Gallery, Jarrow. For services to the community in Tyne and Wear.
- Kenneth Stanley Read, Senior Executive Officer, Department for Education and Employment.
- Arthur William Redwood. For charitable services in Porthcawl, South Wales.
- Mary Ann, Mrs Redwood. For charitable services in Porthcawl, Mid Glamorgan.
- William James Rees. For services in the community in Brecon, Powys.
- Brenda Winifred, Mrs Reid, General Secretary, Bexley Churches Housing Association. For services to the Housing Association Movement.
- John Andrew Reid, Jockey. For services to Horse Racing.
- Robert Albert Revels. For services to the Police.
- Peronelle Imogen, Mrs Richards. For services to the community in Oxford.
- Barbara Mary, Mrs Roberts, lately Office Manager, Port Talbot Magistrates' Court. For services to the Magistracy.
- David Stanley Roberts. For services to Young People in Denbigh.
- Elwyn Rowland Roberts, Trade Marks Agent, Elwyn Roberts and Co. For services to Trade Marks.
- Trevor Roberts. For services to the community in Truro, Cornwall.
- Clifford Barrie Robinson, Senior Divisional Officer, Nottinghamshire Police. For services to the Police.
- Joan Valerie, Mrs Robinson, Executive Officer, Department of Social Security.
- Derek Rogers, Head Gardener, Northern College for Residential Adult Education, Wentworth Castle. For services to Education and to Horticulture.
- Philip Anthony Rogers, Senior Executive Officer, Her Majesty's Customs and Excise.
- Patricia Harwood, Mrs Roome. For services to King's Lynn Hospitals, Norfolk.
- Esther, Mrs Rosenquit. For services to the Jewish community in Brighton and Hove, East Sussex.
- Francis Charlton Ross, Professional and Technology Officer, Ministry of Defence.
- Dora Mary, Mrs Rosser. For services to Hockey in Wales.
- Sydney Brian Rousell. For services to the Friends of All Saints' Church, Sutton Bingham, Somerset.
- Nigel Rowe. For services to Devonport Management Ltd and to the Defence Industry.
- Dennis John Rowley. For services to the Immigration Detention Centre, Campsfield House, Oxfordshire.
- Sheila Blanche, Mrs Roy. For services to the Children's Society in Harrow, Middlesex.
- Edwina Esther, Mrs Roylance. For services to the community in Gotham, Nottinghamshire.
- Barbara Jane, Mrs Ruffell, Member, OFWAT Eastern Customer Service Committee. For services to Water Consumers.
- Jeanie Morton, Mrs Sandison, Founder and Curator, Tingwall Agricultural Museum. For services to Museums and to the community in Shetland.
- Frank Sansom. For services to the community in Middleton, Manchester.
- Joyce Ethel May, Mrs Saunders, Organiser, Bath Blind Club and Blind Handicap Club. For services to Blind People.
- Lily Alice Florence, Mrs Saunders, lately Messenger, Ministry of Defence.
- Thomas Brian Saunders, Dl-Regional Manager, Department of Social Security.
- Raymond Laurence Scott, Operations Manager, British Telecommunications plc. For services to the Telecommunications Industry.
- William Scott, Business Development Manager, Nexus (Tyne and Wear Passenger Transport Executive). For services to Public Transport in Tyne and Wear.
- Stephen John Sebire. For services to the community in Congleton, Cheshire.
- Elizabeth Anne, Mrs Shadrick. For services to the community in Bradworthy, Devon.
- Joan, Mrs Shannon, Local Officer 2, Department of Social Security.
- Raymond Sharp, Head, Hartford Manor County Primary School, Northwich, Cheshire. For services to Education.
- Frank Denton Shaw. For services to the community in Penrith, Cumbria.
- Kevin Benedict Sheehy. For services to the Police.
- David Robert Shepherd, Umpire. For services to Cricket.
- Margaret Hamilton, Mrs Shepherd. For services to Elderly People in Leicester.
- Alfred Sherwin. For services to the Sunshine Hour Swimming Club.
- James Shorrock, Milkman. For services to the Dairy Industry in Preston, Lancashire.
- Marion Fraser, Mrs Sinclair, Nursery Nurse, Haddington Nursery School, East Lothian. For services to Young People.
- Peter Brian Skews, Station Officer (Retained), Cornwall County Fire Brigade. For services to the Fire Service.
- Jean Marion, Mrs Sleeth. For services to the Salvation Army and to the community.
- Miss Anne Smallwood, Secretary to the Vice-Chancellor, University of Oxford. For services to Higher Education.
- Ernest Smedley, Area Officer, Warwickshire Special Constabulary. For services to the Police.
- David Victor-Smith. For services to the Farnham Youth Choir, Surrey.
- Margaret Lilian, Mrs Smith. For services to OXFAM in Liverpool, Merseyside.
- Stanley Henry Smith. For services to the community and to Nature Conservation in Louth, Lincolnshire.
- William Smith, Assistant Regional Superintendent of Works, Scottish Office.
- Miss Winifred Margaret Smith. For services to the community in Wetheringsett, Suffolk.
- Eric Sydney Snoxell, Member, South Bedfordshire District Council. For services to the community in Caddington, South Bedfordshire.
- Cecil John Sparrow, Sub-Post Master. For services to the Post Office and to the community in Laxfield, Suffolk.
- Margot, Mrs Sreberny. For services to the community in Finsbury Park, London.
- Anthony John Stagg, Senior Scientific Officer, Defence Evaluation and Research Agency, Ministry of Defence.
- Christopher John Stagg, Constable, Metropolitan Police. For services to the Police and to the Community.
- Jean Margaret, Mrs Stanford. For services to the WRVS in the West Midlands.
- Roy Staniforth, Leader, Wales Methodist Youth Club, Sheffield, Yorkshire. For services to Young People.
- Jean Helen, Mrs Steele, lately Valuation Executive, Her Majesty's Board of Inland Revenue.
- David Peter Stephens. For services to the Air Training Corps, Cornwall.
- John W. W. Stevenson. For services to the community in Glasgow.
- John Anthony Stewart. For public services.
- Andrew George Strachan, Constable, Tayside Police. For services to the Police and to the community.
- Ian Strong, Director, Yorkshire Rural Community Council. For services to the Rural Community in Yorkshire.
- Julia, Mrs Strout, Senior Personal Secretary, Cabinet Office.
- David William Sully, lately Station Officer (Retained), Somerset Fire Brigade. For services to the Fire Service.
- Miss June Ann Summers, Personal Secretary, Her Majesty's Board of Inland Revenue.
- Reginald Eli Sutton. For services to the community in Oundle, Northamptonshire.
- Maurice James Swapper. For services to the community in Great Chart, Kent.
- Miss Meera Syal, Actress and Writer. For services to Drama.
- William Tagg. For services to Information Technology Education.
- Ada, Mrs Tapling. For services to the community in Woking, Surrey.
- Pamela Carol, Mrs Tarsey. For services to the British Red Cross Society in Lincolnshire.
- Brian Stanley Taylor. For services to the community in Thurrock, Essex.
- Joseph Owen Taylor, Senior Executive Officer, Ministry of Defence.
- Philip William Thomas. For services to the North Eastern Counties Amateur Boxing Association.
- Miss Jenefred Elizabeth Thompson, Administrative Officer, Department of Social Security.
- Keith Thompson. For services to the community in Salisbury, Wiltshire.
- Winfred Maud, Mrs Tidbury. For services to the community in High Wycombe, Buckinghamshire.
- John Tiffney. For services to Local Government and to Environmental Health.
- Ian Denis Todd, Chief Commandant, Metropolitan Special Constabulary. For services to the Police.
- Arthur Topping. For services to the community particularly Scouting, in Golborne, Cheshire.
- Susan Carol, Mrs Torr. For services to Adult Literacy.
- Kitty Lois, Mrs Trewern, Home Help, Cornwall County Council. For services to the community.
- Margaret Rita, Mrs Tucker, Support Manager 1, Department for Education and Employment.
- Anthony Herbert Turner. For services to the community in Lincolnshire.
- Arthur Thomas Turner, Case Worker, Her Majesty's Board of Inland Revenue.
- Raymond Wallace Goulter Turner. For services to the community in Islington, London.
- Ralph Goodwin Vaughan Venables. For services to Motor Cycle Journalism.
- Frank Leslie Vickerman. For services to the community in Irchester, Northamptonshire.
- Joan Edith, Mrs Vincent. For services to the community in Fleet, Hampshire.
- Fred Waddington. For services to the Slaidburn Young Farmers' Club, Lancashire.
- Robert Frederick John Wainwright, Volunteer Leading Firefighter, North Yorkshire Fire and Rescue Service. For services to the Fire Service.
- Doreen, Mrs Wake, Caretaker, University of Lincolnshire and Humberside. For services to Education.
- Catherine Cumpstie, Mrs Walker. For services to the Leonard Cheshire Foundation.
- George Alvin Walker. For services to the Defence Industry.
- Margaret, Mrs Walker, Chief Speech and Language Therapist, St George's Hospital Medical School, London. For services to Health Care.
- Kalliope, Mrs Wareham. For charitable services in Coventry.
- Graham Arthur Hamilton Warner, Aircraft Restorer. For services to Aircraft Restoration.
- Florence Mary, Mrs Warrack, chairman, Royal Infirmary of Edinburgh Volunteers. For services to Health Care.
- Delia Ann, Mrs Waskett, Experimental Worker Grade 1, Defence Evaluation and Research Agency, Ministry of Defence.
- John Kinnear Waterhouse. For services to Disaster Relief and to Engineering.
- Miss Judith Elizabeth Frances Waters, lately Chief Welfare Officer, Crown Prosecution Service.
- Arthur Vincent Reid Watson. For services to Local Government and to the community in Kincardineshire and Deeside.
- William Joseph Weatherley. For services to John Kirk House, Battersea, London.
- Leonard Thomas Weaver, Honorary Archivist, Harwich, Essex. For services to Local History and to the community since 1945.
- Coralie Joyce, Mrs Webber, Student Admissions and Financial Guidance Manager, Highbury College, Portsmouth, Hampshire. For services to Education.
- James Webster, Farm Manager, Snaigow Estates. For services to Agriculture and to the community in Blairgowrie, Perthshire.
- Charles Leslie Collison Weedon, lately Chauffeur to the Lieutenant Governor, Guernsey, Channel Islands.
- The Reverend Canon Edward Arthur Wells. For services to the community in Ipswich, Suffolk.
- Paul Welsh, Entertainments Officer, Elstree and Borehamwood Town Council. For services to Film Preservation and History.
- Sheila, Mrs Whalley. For services to the community in St Helens, Mersey side.
- James Barry White. For services to Journalism.
- Anthony Charles Frederick Whitehead. For services to the Terrence Higgins Trust.
- Sandra Louise, Mrs Whitehead. For services to Dowty Aerospace Propellers.
- Albert James Sayce Williams. For services to Young People and to Science in Mid and West Wales.
- Anthony Carey Williams. For services to Industry in Wales.
- John Herbert Williams, Honorary Secretary, Porthcawl Lifeboat Station, Mid Glamorgan. For services to the RNLI.
- John Hywel Williams. For services to Young People and to Music in Llanelli, Dyfed.
- Margaret Lynne, Mrs Williams, Senior Nurse, Prince Charles Hospital, Merthyr Tydfil. For services to Health Care in Wales.
- Rita, Mrs Williams, lately School Cook, Neath Abbey Infant School. For services to Education and to the community.
- Ruth Emily Anne, Mrs Williams, Foster Carer, Walsall. For services to Young People.
- Valerie Ann, Mrs Williams, Higher Executive Officer, Ministry of Defence.
- Miss Eira Wilson, Administrative Officer, Companies House, Department of Trade and Industry.
- John Watters Wilson, Honorary Treasurer, Maidstone Community Support Centre, Kent. For services to the community.
- Maurice Johnston Wilson. For services to the Exhibitions Industry.
- Brian Malcolm Withington, Regulations Manager, B G plc. For services to the Gas Industry.
- Christopher Wolley, Anti-Smuggling Manager, Her Majesty's Customs and Excise.
- Tony Wood, Sector Officer, Coastguard Agency, Department of Transport.
- Joan Richardson, Mrs Woodhouse, Support Grade 1, Department of Social Security.
- Sylvia Rosina May, Mrs Woods, lately School Crossing Patrol Officer, Wiltshire County Council. For services to Road Safety.
- Richard Elms Worsell, Auxiliary Coastguard, Her Majesty's Coastguard, Birling Gap, Sussex. For services to Safety at Sea.
- Helena Margaret, Mrs Wright. For services to the Save the Children Fund in Tyne and Wear.
- Joyce Veronica, Mrs Wyatt, Receptionist/ Telephonist, Her Majesty's Customs and Excise.
- John Richard Yarwood, Director of Reconstruction, Mostar. For humanitarian services in the former Yugoslavia.
- Constance Jean, Mrs Young, Support Manager 3, Department of the Environment.
- Ronald John Abbott, lately Chief Security Officer, H.M. Embassy, Cairo.
- Kenneth George Aston. For services to Association Football in the U.S.A.
- Dr Lawrence Austin St Leopold Astwood, Chief Dental Officer, Turks and Caicos Islands.
- Paul Nicholas Barry. For services to English language teaching in Ecuador.
- The Reverend Canon Douglas Ward-Boddington, Anglican Chaplain, Oporto.
- Dr Dorothy Mary Jane Bond. For services to educational and cultural links between the U.K. and Uzbekistan.
- Bryan Colin Burrough, Deputy Secretary, Government Hospitality Fund.
- Gladwyn Klosking, Mrs Bush. For services to art in the Cayman Islands.
- Miss Anita Chan Suk-wah, Chief Conference Interpreter, Hong Kong.
- Chan Bing-woon, J.P., chairman, Eastern District Board, Hong Kong.
- Michael Chan Hung-kee, J.P. For voluntary services to the community, Hong Kong.
- Chan Wing-kie Clifford. For voluntary service to the Auxiliary Medical Services in Hong Kong.
- Chen Wen-shuen Vincent, Director, Buildings Office, Chinese University, Hong Kong.
- Cheng Fook-hong, C.P.M., lately Chief Superintendent, Royal Hong Kong Police Force.
- Cheung Sam-cheong, Assistant Regional Commander, Civil Aid Services, Hong Kong.
- Cheung Wai-leung, Q.G.M. For services to sport for the disabled, Hong Kong.
- Ching Kwok-hoo Pedro, Q.P.M., C.P.M., Senior Assistant Commissioner, Royal Hong Kong Police Force.
- Chiu Chun-bong, J.P. For voluntary service to the community, Hong Kong.
- Nicholas Chiu Sai-chuen. For voluntary public service, Hong Kong.
- Dr Christina Chow Po-wong, J.P. For services to the development of health care in Hong Kong.
- Choy Ping-yin, J.P., Senior Principal Executive Officer, Hong Kong.
- Miss Miquette Luce Yvonne Cook. For services to the British community in Portugal.
- Caroline Patricia, Mrs Courtauld. For voluntary charitable services to the community in Hong Kong.
- James Curran, First Secretary, Foreign and Commonwealth Office.
- Miss Ann Elizabeth Cutler. For services to education in Uganda.
- Sandra Lyn, Mrs Darra, Honorary British Consul, Montreux/Vevey.
- Rita, Mrs Davis. For welfare services to the British community, Malta.
- George Elwin Ulric Dawson. For voluntary service as Chairman of the Prison Visiting Committee, British Virgin Islands.
- Mary Georgina, Mrs Dolding. For services to the care of cancer patients, Gibraltar.
- The Reverend Canon John Richard Dorman. For welfare and medical services in South-Western Guyana.
- David Toby Emmet, Q.P.M., C.P.M., Senior Assistant Commissioner, Royal Hong Kong Police Force.
- Norman Sullivan Farndon. For welfare services, particularly through the St John Ambulance Service, Italy.
- Nigel Graham Fenwick, lately Chief Fire Officer, Swaziland.
- Arlene, Mrs Fullerton. For welfare services to the local community, most recently in Morocco and Kuwait.
- Joyce Barbara Harries, Mrs Gardner. For services to nursing in Zambia.
- Robert Duncan Gibson, lately OXFAM Country Representative, Rwanda.
- Simon Che-leung Ho, assistant director of Education, Hong Kong.
- Professor Ivor John Hodgkiss, J.P. For voluntary conservation and environmental service to the community in Hong Kong.
- Robert Hogarth, M.V.O., Second Secretary, Foreign and Commonwealth Office.
- Christopher Barry Howe. For services to university education in Hong Kong.
- John Kirkpatrick. For voluntary service to the British community in Libya.
- Kwan Shu-tsun, assistant director of Education, Hong Kong.
- Elim, Mrs Pong Lau, J.P., Headmistress, Diocesan Girls' School, Hong Kong.
- Dr Michael Lau Wai-mai. For services to heritage conservation in Hong Kong.
- Louise, Mrs Law. For services at Government House, Hong Kong.
- Christopher Lee Ka-keung, J.P., deputy director of Immigration, Hong Kong.
- Mrs Wong Lee Heung-lin, Senior Personal Secretary, Hong Kong Government.
- Miss Miranda Lee Yim-hung, Principal Chinese Language Officer, Hong Kong Government.
- Lee Nam-sang, J.P., Government Chemist, Hong Kong.
- Miss Carol Lethardy, Second Secretary, Foreign and Commonwealth Office.
- Leung Chi-kin, Assistant Principal Immigration Officer, Hong Kong.
- George Arthur Lilley, lately Project Liaison Officer, British High Commission, Canberra.
- Willy Lin Sun-mo. For services to industrial development in Hong Kong.
- Edward David Gerard Llewellyn, Personal Adviser to H.M. Governor, Hong Kong.
- Lok Cham-choi Anthony. For voluntary service as Deputy Commissioner, Auxiliary Medical Services, Hong Kong.
- Hugh Randle Malcolm, Chief Medical Officer, Turks and Caicos Islands.
- John Wynell-Mayow, Assistant Political Adviser, Hong Kong.
- Lindsey McAlister, Director, Hong Kong Youth Arts Festival (HKYAF).
- Miss Sheila Boyd McLean, Personal Assistant, H.M. Consul-General, Washington.
- John Ismay Metcalfe, lately Administrator, European Community Liaison Unit, Gibraltar.
- Mark Scott Thomas Morgan, First Secretary, British High Commission, Valletta.
- George Walter Thomas Moulson, locally engaged Driver, H.M. Embassy, Paris.
- Anthony Joseph Mullins, Q.P.M., C.P.M., Senior Assistant Commissioner, Royal Hong Kong Police Force.
- Ng Kwok-chuen. For services to the Post Office, Hong Kong.
- Randolph O'Hara, Senior Assistant Director, Municipal Services, Hong Kong.
- Alan Frank Parfitt, Second Secretary, U.K. Delegation to the Organisation for Security and Cooperation in Europe, Vienna.
- Miss Janice Patten, Personal Assistant to the Political Adviser, Hong Kong.
- Nicholas William Roseveare, lately OXFAM Country Representative, Mozambique.
- Christine Marie, Mrs Ruhstorfer, locally engaged British Vice-Consul, Munich.
- Clare, Mrs Sakornpant, locally engaged Entry Clearance Officer, H.M. Embassy, Bangkok.
- Kim Anthony Salkeld, Deputy Private Secretary to the Governor, Hong Kong.
- The Reverend William Scott. For services to the commemoration of the War Dead in France.
- John Michael Shannon, Deputy Political Adviser, Hong Kong.
- Miss Anne Elizabeth Shepherd, Principal Assistant Secretary, Treasury, Hong Kong.
- Sin King-kui. For services to the translation of Hong Kong laws into the Chinese language.
- Sheila, Mrs Skiadopoulou. For services to horse-riding for the handicapped in Greece.
- Gerald Robert Slater. For voluntary service to the British community in Libya.
- Victor So Hing-who, J.P. For services to housing and the community in Hong Kong.
- John Benedict Stillwell. For services to British interests in Portugal.
- Brenda Margaret, Mrs Target, chairman, Association of British Women in Malaysia.
- Joseph Louis Tavares. For public and voluntary welfare service in Gibraltar.
- Miss Elspeth Ann Collins-Taylor. For services at Government House and Fanling Lodge, Hong Kong.
- Tong Kin-wah, J.P., Government Electrical and Mechanical Engineer, Hong Kong.
- Tse Kwok Fu, B.E.M., Deputy Regional Commander, Civil Aid Services, Hong Kong.
- Stephen Dennis Wilkinson. For services to English language teaching and to welfare in Madagascar.
- Miss Fay Vera Wolland, locally engaged Accountant, British High Commission, Wellington.
- Allan Wong Chi-yun, J.P. For services to the technological and business development of Hong Kong.
- Wong Chung-kee, Superintendent of Posts, Hong Kong.
- Joseph Wong Tai-nang, Senior Principal Executive Officer, Hong Kong Government.
- Justein Wong Chun, J.P. For voluntary services in the fight against crime in Hong Kong.
- Wong On-yuen. For services to music and the arts in Hong Kong.
- Ronny Wong Fook-hum, Q.C., J.P. For voluntary community and public service in Hong Kong.
- Alice, Mrs Wong Wu Cheuk-lai, Supervisor, Government Secretariat Typing Services, Hong Kong.
- Elizabeth, Mrs Wong Yeung Po-wo. For services to the development of physiotherapy in Hong Kong.
- John Au Yeung Pak-keung, chief executive officer, Hong Kong.
- Yeung Ka-sing, J.P. For voluntary public service, Hong Kong.
- Lawrence Yu Kam-kee. For voluntary community service, Hong Kong.

=== Royal Red Cross ===
==== Member of the Royal Red Cross (RRC) ====
- Major Kevin Davies, Queen Alexandra's Royal Army Nursing Corps, Territorial Army.
- Major Keith Randolph Davy, Queen Alexandra's Royal Army Nursing Corps.
- Wing Commander Anne Marie Welford, Princess Mary's Royal Air Force Nursing Service.

==== Associate of the Royal Red Cross (ARRC) ====
- Corporal Alison Elizabeth Blyth Urquhart, Queen Alexandra's Royal Army Nursing Corps.

=== Queen's Police Medal for Distinguished Service (QPM) ===
England and Wales

- Ian Christopher Beckett, Assistant Chief Constable (Designated), Surrey Police.
- Desmond John Michael Donohoe, Detective Chief Superintendent, Dorset Police.
- George Alan Durno, Detective Inspector, Merseyside Police.
- John William Giffard, Chief Constable, Staffordshire Police.
- John Gilbert Dickie Grieve, Commander, Metropolitan Police.
- Paul Johnson, Detective Superintendent (Retired).
- Bernard James Luckhurst, Commander, Metropolitan Police.
- Stephen David Mannion, Assistant Chief Constable, British Transport Police.
- Michael Messinger, Commander, Metropolitan Police.
- Linda Louise, Mrs Newham, Chief Superintendent, Metropolitan Police.
- Perry Richard Nove, Assistant Commissioner for the City of London Police.
- Gerald Richard O'Connell, Assistant Chief Constable (Designated), Lancashire Constabulary.
- Alan Bruce Oliver, Assistant Chief Constable, Northumbria Police.
- John Tecwyn Owen, Assistant Chief Constable (Designated), North Wales Police.
- Ian Gerald Quinn, Commander, Metropolitan Police.
- Clive Jeremy Robert Roche, Assistant Chief Constable (Designated), West Midlands Police.
- Miss Marjorie Joan Webster, Chief Superintendent, Gwent Constabulary.

Scotland

- Charles Austin Milne, Deputy Commandant, Scottish Police College.
- John Douglas Welsh, M.B.E., Assistant Chief Constable, Strathclyde Police.

Northern Ireland

- Felix Gabriel Duffy, Superintendent, Royal Ulster Constabulary.
- Daniel Blair Wallace, Deputy Chief Constable, Royal Ulster Constabulary.

Channel Islands

- Geoffrey William Denning, Superintendent, Guernsey.

Overseas

- Michael Brian Dowie, Chief Superintendent, Royal Hong Kong Police.
- Spencer Foo Tsun-kong, Chief Superintendent, Royal Hong Kong Police.
- Gordon Fung Siu-yuen, Chief Superintendent, Royal Hong Kong Police.
- Peter Ernest Halliday, Chief Superintendent, Royal Hong Kong Police.
- Michael William Horner, Chief Superintendent, Royal Hong Kong Police.
- Lee Ming-kwai, Assistant Commissioner of Police, Royal Hong Kong Police.
- Eric Leung Chi-bun, Chief Superintendent, Royal Hong Kong Police.
- Ng Wai-kit, Chief Superintendent, Royal Hong Kong Police.
- Miss Millie Stradmoor, Chief Superintendent, Royal Hong Kong Police.

=== Queen's Fire Service Medal for Distinguished Service (QFSM) ===
England And Wales

- Colin Cunliffe, lately Assistant Divisional Officer, Lancashire County Fire Brigade.
- Norman Staines Dickerson, Chief Fire Officer, Leicestershire Fire and Rescue Service.
- Roger Anthony Graham, Divisional Officer 1, Gloucestershire Fire and Rescue Service.
- Peter Michael Holland, Chief Fire Officer, Bedfordshire County Fire and Rescue Service.
- Bryan Eric Smith, Chief Fire Officer, Norfolk Fire Service.
- William George Welsh, Senior Divisional Officer, Kent Fire Brigade.

Scotland

- David Anthony Clark, Assistant Firemaster, Fife Fire and Rescue Service.
- Andrew Russell, Firemaster, Dumfries and Galloway Fire Brigade.
- John Chapman Gray Tait, Sub Officer, Lothian and Borders Fire Brigade.

Overseas

- Leslie William Edmonds, Chief Fire Officer, Gibraltar.
- Pik Ying-keung, Chief Fire Officer, Royal Hong Kong Fire Service.

=== Colonial Police and Fire Service Medal for Meritorious Service (CPM) ===
- John Martin Henry Bicknell, Senior Superintendent, Royal Hong Kong Police Force.
- Bruce Bill, Superintendent, Royal Hong Kong Police Force.
- Roger John Booth, Senior Superintendent, Royal Hong Kong Police Force.
- Chan Ho-yuen, Principal Fireman, Hong Kong Fire Service.
- Chan Kui-man, Superintendent (Ambulance), Hong Kong Fire Service.
- Chau Kwok-kuen, Station Sergeant, Royal Hong Kong Police Force.
- Cheung Kwok-kwan, Senior Divisional Officer, Hong Kong Fire Service.
- Cheung, Yue-keung, Principal Ambulanceman, Hong Kong Fire Service.
- Choi Chor, Principal Fireman, Hong Kong Fire Service.
- Choi Kwong-tai, Senior Divisional Officer, Hong Kong Fire Service.
- Charles Chu Man-chun, Senior Divisional Officer, Hong Kong Fire Service.
- Chung Hiu-pang, Senior Superintendent, Royal Hong Kong Police Force.
- Eric Crowter, Senior Superintendent, Royal Hong Kong Police Force.
- Ronald Howard Davies, Senior Superintendent, Royal Hong Kong Police Force.
- Fong Kai-cheung, Superintendent, Royal Hong Kong Police Force.
- Blake David Marshall Hancock, Superintendent, Royal Hong Kong Police Force.
- William Michael Harvey, Senior Superintendent, Royal Hong Kong Police Force.
- Arthur Kwok Chi-shun, Senior Superintendent (Auxiliary), Royal Hong Kong Auxiliary Police Force.
- Lam Chun-fai, Principal Fireman, Hong Kong Fire Service.
- Lau Kam-yiu, Principal Fireman, Hong Kong Fire Service.
- Lau Sik-on, Assistant Chief Ambulance Officer, Hong Kong Fire Service.
- Law Hang-chi, Principal Ambulanceman, Hong Kong Fire Service.
- Leung Yu-kau, Station Sergeant, Royal Hong Kong Police Force.
- Victor Lo Yik-kee, Superintendent, Royal Hong Kong Police Force.
- Luk Kai-lau, Station Sergeant, Royal Hong Kong Police Force.
- Ma Hon-ming, Principal Fireman, Hong Kong Fire Service.
- David Madoc-Jones, Senior Superintendent, Royal Hong Kong Police Force.
- Mok Ying-chuen, Station Sergeant, Royal Hong Kong Police Force.
- Trevor John Oakes, Senior Superintendent, Royal Hong Kong Police Force.
- Michael Philip O'Callaghan, Senior Superintendent, Royal Hong Kong Police Force.
- Michael Stewart Parker, Superintendent, Royal Hong Kong Police Force.
- Shing Hee-luk, Station Sergeant, Royal Hong Kong Police Force.
- Siu Kin-tak, Station Sergeant, Royal Hong Kong Police Force.
- So Wing-cheung, Sergeant, Royal Hong Kong Police Force.
- Suen Ching-hing, Principal Fireman, Hong Kong Fire Service.
- Suen Kwai-leung, Superintendent, Royal Hong Kong Police Force.
- Tam Yau-tong, Station Sergeant, Royal Hong Kong Police Force.
- Ting Siu-ki, Station Sergeant, Royal Hong Kong Police Force.
- To Ho-kee, Senior Superintendent, Royal Hong Kong Police Force.
- Betty, Mrs Tsang Chang Hawk-shu, Senior Superintendent (Auxiliary), Royal Hong Kong Auxiliary Police Force.
- Tsang Pang-fei, Senior Inspector, Royal Hong Kong Police Force.
- Iain Tse Ho-yin, Superintendent, Royal Hong Kong Police Force.
- Tung Wing-cheong, Station Officer, Royal Hong Kong Police Force.
- Gavin Munro Neville Ure, Chief Superintendent (Auxiliary), Royal Hong Kong Auxiliary Police Force.
- Miss Patricia Kathleen Walsh, Superintendent, Royal Hong Kong Police Force.
- Richard Andrew Williamson, Senior Superintendent, Royal Hong Kong Police Force.
- Wong Doon-yee, Senior Superintendent, Royal Hong Kong Police Force.
- Wong Tze-on, Senior Station Officer, Hong Kong Fire Service.
- Yam Tat-wing, Senior Superintendent, Royal Hong Kong Police Force.
- Yeung Kwong-hung, Senior Divisional Officer, Hong Kong Fire Service.
- Robert Louis Youill, Superintendent, Royal Hong Kong Police Force.
- Yu Chun-ming, Principal Fireman, Hong Kong Fire Service.
