= Audrey Lees =

Audrey Lees may refer to:

- Audrey Lees (architect)
- Audrey Lees (politician)
