= Jim Flegg =

British horticulturalist and broadcaster (1937–2024)

- Born: 23 April 1937; Hong Kong
- Died: 7 May 2024 (aged 87)
- Alma mater: Imperial College London
- Occupation: Ornithologist, horticulturist, television presenter, researcher, author
- Employer: East Malling Research Station
- Awards: Officer of the Order of the British Empire

James John Maitland Flegg, OBE (23 April 1937 – 7 May 2024) was a British horticulturalist, broadcaster, ornithologist and writer on bird-related matters.

== Life and career ==
Flegg was born in Hong Kong on 23 April 1937 and was a zoology graduate of Imperial College London who spent much of his subsequent professional career working in horticulture at the East Malling Research Station. He authored a number of papers on nematodes.

Flegg also had a lifelong interest in ornithology, having joined the Rochester and District Natural History Society as a junior member. As an ornithologist, he became well-known, having become president of Kent Ornithological Society in 1977, and was Director of the British Trust for Ornithology from 1995 to 1998. He was a presenter on the regional Coastal Ways and Country Ways television programmes for Meridian Broadcasting. He also served as chairman of the trustees of Dungeness Bird Observatory.

Flegg was a bird ringer and ringed over 30,000 birds. Among the books Flegg authored are the Photographic Field Guide: Birds of Australia, and a number of books designed to interest children in living things from an early age.

He was appointed an Officer of the Order of the British Empire (OBE) in the 1997 Birthday Honours.

Flegg died at home on 7 May 2024, at the age of 87.
