= Richard Carter (histopathologist) =

British histopathologist

Professor Richard Carter CBE FRCP FRCPath
- Born: Richard Lawrance Carter; 5 September 1934 (age 91)
- Occupation: Histopathologist

Richard Lawrance Carter (born 5 September 1934) is a British histopathologist.

He graduated from Oxford University in 1960.

He then worked as an histopathologist at the Royal Marsden Hospital. From 1974 to 2001 he was an Honorary Consultant and Reader at the Institute of Cancer Research.

He was Honorary Professor at the University of Surrey from 1994 to 2002.

From 1985 to 1995, he served as chair of the Department of Health's Carcinogenicity Committee, and sat on other government committees.

He was made a Commander of the Order of the British Empire (CBE) in the 1997 Birthday Honours, "For services to Health Care".
