= Joseph Helszajn =

British engineer and academic (died 2019)

- Born: 1934; Belgium
- Died: 11 October 2019 (aged 84–85)
- Citizenship: United Kingdom
- Education: Northern Polytechnic Institute; Santa Clara University; University of Leeds
- Known for: Ferrite circulators and isolators
- Scientific career
- Fields: Microwave engineering
- Workplaces: Heriot-Watt University

Joseph Helszajn OBE, FRSE, FREng, FIEE, FCGI, (25 April 1934 – 11 October 2019) was a British engineer and academic, who was a Professor of Microwave Engineering at Heriot-Watt University. He was best known for his work on non-reciprocal microwave circuits and devices, such as yttrium iron garnet isolators and circulators. During his tenure, Helszajn has authored multiple engineering textbooks on non-reciprocal microwave devices.

Helszajn was born in Belgium in 1934 and emigrated to England in 1946. After obtaining a full technological certificate from Northern Polytechnic Institute in 1955, he obtained his M.S. degree from Santa Clara University in 1964. Helszajn has completed his doctoral degree in Leeds University in 1969. He was awarded the J.J. Thomson Medal by the Institution of Electrical Engineers in 1995, and elected a Fellow of the Royal Academy of Engineering in 1996. He was made an Officer of the Order of the British Empire in the 1997 Queen's Birthday Honours for services to engineering.

He died on 11 October 2019.

== Selected publications ==
Books

- Joseph Helszajn, Principles of Microwave Ferrite Engineering, Wiley, 1969
- —, Nonreciprocal Microwave Junctions and Circulators, Wiley, 1975
- —, Waveguide Junction Circulators: Theory and Practice, Wiley, 1998
- —, Ridge Waveguides and passive Microwave Components, Wiley, 2000
- —, The Stripline Circulator: Theory and Practice, Wiley, 2008

Journal articles

- Helszajn, J.; Tan, F. C. (1975). "Design Data for Radial-Waveguide Circulators Using Partial-Height Ferrite Resonators". IEEE Transactions on Microwave Theory and Techniques. 23 (3): 288–298. Bibcode:1975ITMTT..23..288H. doi:10.1109/TMTT.1975.1128550.
- Helszajn, J.; James, D. S. (1978). "Planar Triangular Resonators with Magnetic Walls". IEEE Transactions on Microwave Theory and Techniques. 26 (2): 95–100. Bibcode:1978ITMTT..26...95H. doi:10.1109/TMTT.1978.1129320.
- Helszajn, J.; James, D. S.; Nisbet, W. T. (1979). "Circulators Using Planar Triangular Resonators". IEEE Transactions on Microwave Theory and Techniques. 27 (2): 188–193. Bibcode:1979ITMTT..27..188H. doi:10.1109/TMTT.1979.1129584.
- Lyon, R. W.; Helszajn, J. (1982). "A Finite Element Analysis of Planar Circulators Using Arbitrarily Shaped Resonators". IEEE Transactions on Microwave Theory and Techniques. 30 (1): 1964–1974. Bibcode:1982ITMTT..30.1964L. doi:10.1109/TMTT.1982.1131352.
- Helszajn, J.; Sharp, J. (1983). "Resonant Frequencies, Q-Factor, and Susceptance Slope Parameter of Waveguide Circulators Using Weakly Magnetized Open Resonators". IEEE Transactions on Microwave Theory and Techniques. 31 (6): 434–441. Bibcode:1983ITMTT..31..434H. doi:10.1109/TMTT.1983.1131522.
- D'Orazio, W.; Wu, K.; Helszajn, J. (2004). "A Substrate Integrated Waveguide Degree-2 Circulator". IEEE Microwave and Wireless Components Letters. 14 (5): 207–209. doi:10.1109/LMWC.2004.827867. S2CID 37684560.
