= Roland Parker =

English cricketer and Royal Air Force officer (1925–2020)

Roland Parker MBE
Personal information
- Full name: Roland John Parker
- Born: 19 July 1925; Pudsey, Yorkshire, England
- Died: October 2020 (aged 95); Pudsey, Yorkshire, England
- Batting: Right-handed
- Bowling: Right-arm off break

Career statistics
Competition	First-class
Matches	2
Runs scored	36
Batting average	12.00
100s/50s	0/0
Top score	18
Catches/stumpings	0/–
- Source: Cricinfo, 19 February 2019

Roland John Parker MBE (19 July 1925 - October 2020) was an English former first-class cricketer and Royal Air Force officer.

Parker was born at Pudsey, where he was coached by Herbert Sutcliffe and Len Hutton during his youth. He joined the Royal Air Force in the latter stages of the Second World War, serving as a pilot officer as an emergency commission on probation in July 1945. After a successful probation he was promoted to flying officer in October 1945.

He played first-class cricket for the Combined Services cricket team in 1947, making two appearances against Northamptonshire and Gloucestershire, scoring 36 runs. Fifty years later he was a made an MBE in the 1997 Birthday Honours for services to community sport in Pudsey.
