= Approved Driving Instructors National Joint Council =

The Approved Driving Instructors National Joint Council (ADINJC) is a British organisation to bring together associations of local driving instructors, to allow driving instructors to act as a unified body when needed.

It is composed of a number of smaller local driving instructors' association, each of which has a vote at larger meetings.

== History ==
The ADINJC was formed in 1973 during the fuel crisis, leading figures at the time came together due to the fear that fuel shortage would stop driving instructors from working. Currently the ADINJC is the third largest organisation in the driving instruction industry (excluding driving schools, such as the British School of Motoring) with consultative status with the Driving Standards Agency (DSA).

The ADINJC aims to further the professional and financial interests of driving instructors through consultation with the Department for Transport and the DSA. It is a non-profit organisation with no salaried staff (though some officers receive an honorarium).

== See also ==
- Approved Driving Instructor
