= Maneck Dalal =

Businesspeople from Mumbai

Maneck Ardeshir Sohrab Dalal OBE (24 December 1918 – 6 March 2017) was a manager in the early days of Tata Airlines and Air India. He was civil aviation attaché for the Indian High Commission in London and a Parsi. After he retired from Air India in 1977 he became managing director of Tata Ltd in the United Kingdom. He was chairman of the Bharatiya Vidya Bhavan in London.
