= Kenneth Davey =

English professor (1932–2021)

Kenneth Jackson Davey OBE (7 December 1932 – 19 February 2021) was Emeritus Professor at the International Development Department, University of Birmingham and former Senior Adviser to the Local Government and Public Service reform Initiative of the Open Society Foundations.

== Early life ==
Davey was born in Leigh-on-Sea, Essex and attended Silcoates School, near Wakefield. He studied history at Merton College, Oxford, from 1951 to 1954, graduating with an MA (Oxon). Between 1954 and 1956, he did national service in Cyprus with the Royal Artillery, taking part in undercover operations during the Cyprus Emergency.

== Local government specialist ==
After his military service, Davey joined the Colonial Service. He was posted to Uganda in 1956, serving as a District Officer and Magistrate in Toro District. He then had stints in Bunyoro, Masindi and Mbale. In 1962, he was posted to the Ministry of Local Government in Kampala, before in 1964 becoming Senior Courts Advisor at the Ministry of Justice. His final Colonial Service posting was as Chief Regional Inspector, Ministry of Local Government, Kampala, from 1966, where he was responsible for local government finance reform. In 1969, he joined the Institute of Local Government Studies at the University of Birmingham.

In his years as a specialist in local government, notably local finance, Davey worked for HM Overseas Civil Service, the World Bank, the Department for International Development (DFID), United Nations Human Settlements Programme (UNCHS), the Council of Europe and European Union (EU).

His work in latter years focused particularly on assistance to local government reform in Central and Eastern Europe, and he was director of research into the institutional framework of urban management.

Between 1972 and 2008, he carried out consultancies on intergovernmental fiscal relations and public administration reform for the Council of Europe, DFID, EU, UNCHS, United Nations Development Programme, World Bank and other agencies in Bangladesh, Bosnia-Herzegovina, Brazil, China, Croatia, Czech Republic, Georgia, Hungary, India, Indonesia, Jordan, Kenya, Macedonia, Mexico, Moldova, Nepal, Pakistan, Philippines, Poland, Romania, Russia, Serbia, South Africa, Sudan, Tanzania, Turkey and Uganda.

== University of Birmingham ==
From 1969 to 2000, he taught at the School of Public Policy at the University of Birmingham. His posts included professor of development administration (1981–2000), director, Institute of Local Government Studies (1983–88) and head of school (1988–89).

== 2008 financial crisis ==
Davey led a group of European experts examining the effects of the 2008 financial crisis at the local level. This work was carried out by the European Committee on Local and Regional Democracy (CDLR) at the Council of Europe, in co-operation with the Open Society Foundation. The group's experts included Paul Bernd Spahn and Gabor Peteri.

== Personal life ==
Davey married Beryl Herbert in 1962. The couple had three children together: Guy, Julian and Stephanie. He was a fellow of the Royal Society of Arts, and awarded the OBE in 1997. He was also awarded the Officer's Cross of the Order of Merit of the Republic of Hungary in 1998.

== Publications ==
As editor:

- The Impact of the Economic Downturn on Local Government in Europe, report to the Council of Europe Inter-ministerial Conference at Utrecht, 2009 and Strasbourg, 2010
- Investing in Regional Development: Policies and Practices in EU Candidate Countries (Open Society Institute, 2003)
- Fiscal Autonomy and Efficiency: Reforms in the former Soviet Union (Open Society Institute, 2002)
- Balancing National and Local Responsibilities: Education Management and Finance in Four Central European Countries (Open Society Institute, 2002)
- Local Government Finances: Options for Reform (Local Government Know-How Programme 1998), with Gabor Peteri

As author:

- Urban Management: the Challenge of Growth (Avebury 1997)
- Elements of Urban Management (World Bank, 1993)
- Readings and Case Studies in Urban Finance (UN Centre for Human Settlements - 1988)
- Financing Regional Government (John Wiley, 1983)
- (Participation and Basic Needs (I.L.O. 1978), with D M E Curtis, A Hughes and A W Shepherd
- Taxing a Peasant Society (Charles Knight, 1974)
