= Highland Stoneware =

Pottery

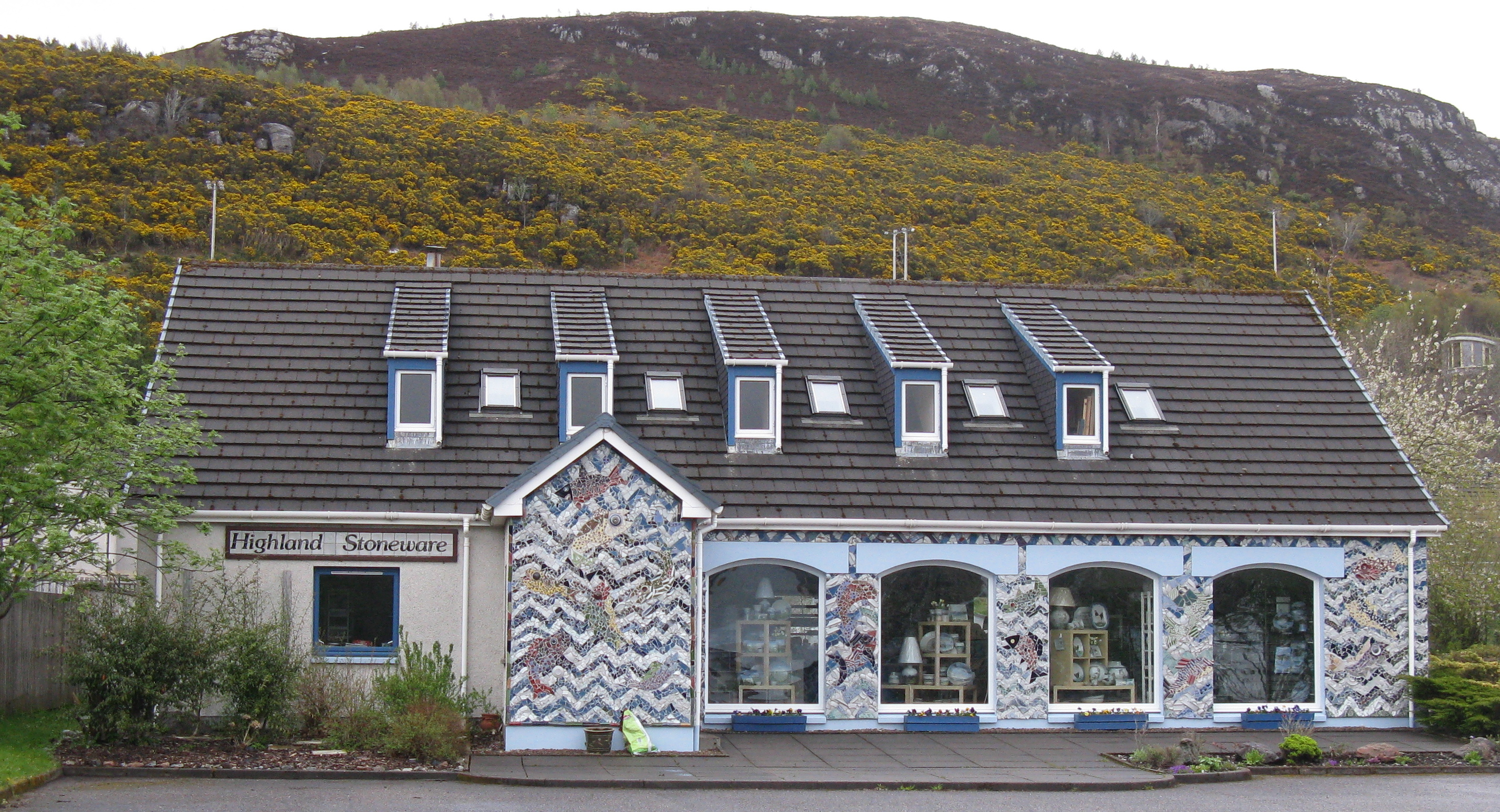
The Ullapool branch of the pottery by Loch Broom which was established in 1981

Highland Stoneware is a pottery in Lochinver and Ullapool. It was founded by David Grant in 1973–4 with support from the Highlands and Islands Development Board and David Douglas, 12th Marquess of Queensberry.

Vases decorated with thistles were commissioned from the pottery for the Queen's Scottish home of Balmoral and they appeared in final photographs of the monarch.
