= Audrey Lees (architect) =

English architect

- Born: January 1927
- Died: 21 April 2012
- Occupation: Urban planner
- Awards: Officer of the Order of the British Empire (1997 Birthday Honours)

Audrey Mary Lees OBE (1927-2012), was an English architect and town planner. She was the city of Liverpool's chief planner. Lees worked in Coventry's Architecture and Town Planning unit from 1957 to 1959, where she was part of a team that included many people who went on to have successful careers in other cities around the UK. She was also a senior planner with the Greater London Council.

In 1987 she was working as a Planning and Environmental Consultant and was visiting professor in Environmental Studies at Wye College. She also served as Chair of the Inland Waterways Amenity Advisory Council.

She was appointed an Officer of the Order of the British Empire (OBE) in the 1997 Birthday Honours, "For services to Inland Waterways and to Planning".

She died on 21 April 2012, aged 85.

== North Cornwall inquiry ==
In 1992, Lees was appointed by the government to lead an inquiry into planning decisions in North Cornwall.

Journalists challenged a series of decisions taken by the planning committee at North Cornwall District Council in the late 1980s and early 1990s, resulting in a television documentary, Cream Teas and Concrete (part of Channel 4's Cutting Edge series), aired in 1991. It was said that a large number of planning permits were given to councillors on the planning committee (including their immediate relatives), and that illegal construction was permitted in either the open countryside or Areas of Outstanding Natural Beauty, all of which were against officers' advice to withhold consent. Residents of North Cornwall filed 39 complaints with the Ombudsman in 1990–91. Michael Howard, the (then) Secretary of State, selected an independent authority to conduct an administrative inquiry into planning regulation in North Cornwall in 1992. Lees made 18 recommendations in her report the following year (Department of the Environment, 1993), much of which dealt with councillor behaviour. The inquiry focused on how public confidence had been harmed as officer recommendations were disregarded and councils claimed to have behaved inappropriately by approving a substantial number of planning proposals to fellow councillors.

Lees's report, Enquiry into the Planning System of North Cornwall District, drew a line between such unethical behaviour and the accusations of misconduct. She made it clear that certain matters were outside of her jurisdiction, but said "...I cannot state categorically that there was no criminal corruption or conspiracy, only that I found no indication of it". The detailed recommendations made it clear that elected councillors had a larger commitment to their local society, and that strict care was needed when deciding on planning proposals requested by fellow councillors or responding in response to lobbying from applicants or constituents. Although councils have the right not to comply with their officers' recommendations, they must have fair cause based on sound planning judgement. Officers in North Cornwall were chastised for not including enough information in their findings on planning proposals, according to one complaint. In the future, councillors will need additional clarification in these regions.

== Publications ==
- Car Parking in Cities was published in 1963 in Town Planning Review.
- The Springburn Study (Book Review), Town Planning Review, 1968.
- "London: The Unique City" (Book Review) was published in Town Planning Review in 1984.
