= Internet relationship =

Relationship between people who have met online

An internet relationship is a relationship between people who have met online, and in many cases know each other only via the Internet. Online relationships are similar in many ways to pen pal relationships. This relationship can be romantic, platonic, or based on business affairs. An internet relationship (or online relationship) is generally sustained for a certain amount of time before being titled a relationship, just as in-person relationships. The major difference here is that an internet relationship is sustained via computer or online service, and the individuals in the relationship may or may not ever meet each other in person. Otherwise, the term is quite broad and can include relationships based upon text, video, audio, or even virtual character. This relationship can be between people in different regions, different countries, different sides of the world, or even people who reside in the same area but do not communicate in person. This is often facilitated via online spaces, like chatrooms and direct messages.

== Technological advances ==
According to J. Michael Jaffe, author of Gender, Pseudonyms, and CMC: Masking Identities and Baring Souls, "the Internet was originally established to expedite communication between governmental scientists and defense experts, and was not at all intended to be the popular 'interpersonal mass medium' it has become", yet new and revolutionary devices enabling the mass public to communicate online are constantly being developed and released.

Rather than having many devices for different uses and ways of interacting, communicating online is more accessible and cheaper by having an Internet function built into one device, such as mobile phones, tablets, laptops, and smartphones. Other ways of communicating online with these devices are via services and applications such as Email, Videotelephony (via FaceTime or Zoom), instant messages, social networking services, asynchronous discussion groups or virtual worlds.

Some of these ways of communicating online are asynchronous (meaning not in real time), such as YouTube and some are synchronous (immediate communication), such as Twitter. Synchronous communication occurs when two or more participants are interacting in real time via voice or text chat.

== Digital boundaries and online relationship conflict ==
Internet-based relationships—those that begin or are primarily maintained through digital communication—have become increasingly common, making digital boundaries and online conflict key topics of research. Because most interactions occur through messaging apps, social media platforms, or other online tools, partners must negotiate how frequently they communicate, which platforms they prefer, and how available they expect one another to be. Interpreting digital cues such as response timing, read receipts, and written tone also plays a major role in shaping trust, emotional closeness, and overall satisfaction.

Differences in communication expectations can easily create tension. One partner may want quick replies or daily video calls, while the other prefers slower, less frequent contact. The lack of nonverbal cues—such as facial expressions or vocal tone—can make misunderstandings more likely and allow minor issues to escalate more quickly.

Social media behavior is another frequent source of conflict. Partners may disagree about posting their relationship online, interacting with others on social platforms, sharing private content, or deciding how visible their relationship should be. Actions such as liking posts, commenting, or replying late can be interpreted differently depending on each partner's expectations. These issues tend to be especially significant in long-distance or online-first relationships, where social media often functions as a key source of reassurance and emotional visibility.

=== Role of cultural, personal, and contextual differences ===
==== Cultural differences ====
Cultural norms play a major role in shaping how individuals manage digital boundaries. Expectations related to privacy, emotional expression, and online openness differ widely across cultures. In collectivist societies, frequent communication may be seen as a sign of care and loyalty, whereas in individualistic cultures the same behavior may be viewed as intrusive or overbearing. Understanding these cultural differences can reduce misinterpretation in cross-cultural online relationships.

==== Personal differences ====
Differences in personality, emotional needs, and past experiences also influence digital boundary preferences. Individuals who value independence may prefer limited or selective communication, while those seeking emotional closeness may desire frequent contact or reassurance. When these preferences do not align, misunderstandings or emotional strain may occur. Clear communication about response expectations and personal boundaries can help maintain trust and stability.

==== Contextual differences ====
The context of a relationship—such as long-distance arrangements, time-zone differences, or work schedules—can further influence communication patterns. Long-distance partners often rely heavily on digital tools to remain emotionally connected, making online presence and response timing particularly meaningful. Additionally, norms vary across platforms: public posts may signal commitment, whereas private messages may carry more intimate meaning.

=== Impact on emotional well-being and relationship satisfaction ===
Research shows that couples who openly negotiate their digital boundaries tend to experience fewer misunderstandings and lower levels of jealousy. Conversely, unclear or repeatedly disregarded boundaries can contribute to feelings of anxiety, mistrust, and emotional exhaustion.

Although digital communication can strengthen social support networks, it does not always replicate the emotional benefits of face-to-face interactions. A Canadian study found that in-person friendships were more strongly associated with subjective well-being than the size of one's online network.

Studies on adolescents similarly indicate that high-quality friendships—whether online or offline—support emotional health. However, excessive social media use may be associated with internalizing symptoms such as anxiety or sadness, suggesting that the quality of interactions is more important than quantity.

=== Digital literacy and respectful online communication ===
Digital literacy and respectful communication are increasingly important as technology shapes online relationships. This includes awareness of one's online habits, understanding emotional needs, and clearly communicating expectations. Respecting each other's digital boundaries can prevent misunderstandings, reduce conflict, and strengthen trust in internet-mediated relationships.

== Types of relationships ==
Many types of internet relationships are possible in today's world of technology.

=== Dating website innovations ===
Although the availability of uploading videos to the internet is not a new innovation, it has been made easier since 2008 thanks to YouTube. YouTube began the surge of video streaming sites in 2005 and within three years, smaller web developers started implementing video sharing on their sites. Internet dating sites have benefitted greatly since the surge in easiness and accessibility of picture and video uploading. Videos and pictures are equally important for most personal profiles. These profiles can be found on sites used for interpersonal relationships other than dating as well. "The body, although graphically absent, does not have to be any less present." Older and less advanced sites usually still allow, and often require, each user to upload a picture. Newer and more advanced sites offer the possibility of streaming media live via the user's profile for the site. The inclusion of videos and pictures has become almost a necessity for sexual social networking sites to maintain the loyalty of their members. It is appealing to internet users to be able to view and share videos, especially when forming relationships or friendships.

Other technological innovations, like app and computer-related means of accessibility, have contributed to the rapid popularity of online dating. Both computer and app-based mediums facilitate interactions with other users to fulfill their personal motivations for casual dating, long-term commitments, and entertainment. Yet, the portability of apps, such as Tinder, allow easy and instantaneous access to making potential matches. Additionally, dating apps utilize location-based features, predominantly through the usage of smart phones and other devices. As a result, it is estimated that more than 384.15 million people worldwide currently use dating apps, and that number is expected by researchers to increase.

=== Users ===
According to an article in the New York Times, mediated matchmaking has been around since the mid-1800s. Online dating was made available in the mid-1990s, with the creation of the first dating sites. These dating sites create a space for liberation of sexuality. According to Sam Yagan of OkCupid, "the period between New Year's Day and Valentine's Day is [our] busiest six weeks of the year". Changes that online dating companies have created include not only the increase of pickiness in singles, but the rise in interracial marriages and spread the acceptance of homosexual individuals. Dating sites "are a place where sexual minorities, inter-sexed people and gay people are enjoying a newly found freedom". Several studies have shown the availability of online dating to produce a greater closeness and intimacy between individuals because it circumvents barriers that face-to-face interactions might have. "Participating in personal relationships online allow for almost full freedom from power relations in the offline/real world."

A plethora of virtual sexual identities are represented in online profiles. The amount of personal information users are being asked to provide is constantly increasing. More and more online users are starting to explore and experiment with aspects of their sexual identities, whereas before, they may have felt uncomfortable due to social constraints or fear of possible repercussions. Most internet sites containing personal profiles require individuals to fill in "personal information" sections. Often these sections include a series of multiple choice questions. Due to the anonymity of these virtual profiles, individuals are more frequent to 'role'-play at being one of the predefined 'types', although offline, reservations may inhibit the individual from sharing true answers.

There have also been many studies done to observe online daters and their reason for turning to the internet to look for romantic partners. According to Robert Brym and Rhonda Lenton, users of online games, websites, and other virtual communities are encouraged to conceal their identities and learn things about themselves that they never knew before. With a concealed identity, an online user can be whoever they want to be at that exact moment. They have the ability to venture outside of their comfort zone and act as someone completely different.

The Journal of Computer-Mediated Communication reports the results of a study conducted by Robert J. Stephure, Susan D. Boon, Stacy L. MacKinnon, and Vicki L. Deveau on types of relationships online participants were seeking. They concluded that "when asked what they were looking for in an online relationship, the considerable majority of participants expressed interest in seeking fun, companionship, and someone to talk to. Most also reported interests in developing casual friendships and dating relationships with online partners. Substantially fewer reported using the Internet for the specific purposes of identifying potential sexual or marital partners." This aligns with the socioemotional selectivity theory, where a changing perception of time influences an individual's perception of their own social goals. Young adults make up a significant portion of online dating sites' user base, and for them, time and how their time is spent is less of a priority in forming new relationships, as opposed to older demographics who are more aware of their emotional goals and perception of time. Therefore, research suggests that casual, fun-seeking relationships are more common.

However, a study published in the journal Proceedings of the National Academy of Sciences in 2012, looked at about 19,000 married people and those who met their spouse online said their marriage was more satisfying than those who met their spouse offline. Plus, marriages that began online were less likely to end in separation or divorce.

Faye Mishna, Alan McLuckie, and Michael Saini, co-authors of the Social Work Research article Real-World Dangers in an Online Reality: A Qualitative Study Examining Online Relationships and Cyber Abuse, reported the results of their research and observation of over 35,000 individuals between the ages of 6 and 24 who have been or currently are a part of an internet relationship about which they had concerns, and consequently contacted an organization that provided online support. Of the final 346 posts chosen to be included in the study, the average age of online users sharing information about their online relationship(s) was 14 years old. The overwhelming result was that children and youth consider their online relationships to be just as "real" as their offline relationships. The study also showed that the internet plays a crucial role in sexual and romantic experiences of this population of adolescent users.

=== Success of dating websites and social networks ===
Canaan Partners have reported that the dating industry brings in an estimate of 3-4 billion dollars yearly from membership fees and advertisements. The range of dating sites has expanded vastly over the past two decades. There are dating websites that focus on the matchmaking of certain groups of people based on religion, sexual preference, race, etc.

Dating apps, such as Tinder, have transformed the methods people engage in pursuing online relationships, and thus, have enhanced the success rates of online dating. The features of these apps offer accessibility, are often free to use, and allow users to tap into broader demographics; therefore these features gain more popularity and success in aiding in relationship endeavors. The broad user base dating apps usually accrue also has been found to appeal to users who aren't looking for traditional relationships, with only casual sex inciting them. This has been one of the most common reasons listed by participants in study assessing interest in dating apps. For example, Tinder's success can be attributed to the features of the app that facilitate matchmaking practices with the swipe of a finger. Tinder's site-specific features regard a user's physical, social, and psychosocial needs and appeal to a user's stratified preferences – such as age, gender, and distance – as inputted by the user themselves. Dating apps prioritize a person's identity and characteristics as a method to ensure success in their relationships.

The average life expectancy has been on a rise, leaving many young singles feeling as if they have plenty of time to find a life partner. This opens up time to travel and experience things without the burden of a relationship. As of 1996, more than 20% of Canadians "were not living in the same census subdivision as they were five years earlier" and as of 1998, more than half of employed Canadians worried "they [did] not have enough time to spend with their family and friends". Due to an increase in many businesses requiring their employees to travel, singles, often young professionals, find online dating websites to be the perfect answer to their "problem", states Brym and Lenton.

Erik Shipmon, author of "Why Do People Date Online?", exclaims, "the Internet is the ultimate singles' bar—without the noise, the drunks, and the high cost of all those not-so-happy hours. Nor, thanks to online dating membership sites, do you have to depend on your friends and family to hook you up with people they think would be perfect for you—and who wouldn't be perfect for, well, anyone, which is why they are still unattached".

=== Cybersex ===
Some people who are in an online relationship also participate in cybersex, which is a virtual sex encounter in which two or more individuals who are connected remotely via computer network send each other sexually explicit messages describing a sexual experience. This can also include individuals communicating sexually via video or audio. Some websites offer a cybersex service, where a patron pays the website owner in exchange for an online sexual experience with another person.

Cybersex sometimes includes real life masturbation. The quality of a cybersex encounter typically depends upon the participants' abilities to evoke a vivid, visceral mental picture in the minds of their partners. Imagination and suspension of disbelief are also critically important. Cybersex can occur either within the context of existing or intimate relationships, e.g. among lovers who are geographically separated, or among individuals who have no prior knowledge of one another and meet in virtual spaces or cyberspaces and may even remain anonymous to one another. In some contexts cybersex is enhanced by the use of a webcam to transmit real-time video of the partners.

=== Social networking relationships ===
Social networking has enabled people to connect with each other via the internet. Sometimes, members of a social networking service do know all, or many of their "friends" (Facebook) or "connections" (LinkedIn) etc. in person. However, sometimes internet relationships are formed through these services, including but not limited to: Facebook, Myspace, Google Plus, LinkedIn, Twitter, Instagram, DeviantArt, Xanga and Discord.

"Social networking service" is a very broad term, branching out to websites based on many different aspects. One aspect that is possible on all social networking sites is the possibility of an internet relationship. These sites enable users to search for new connections based on location, education, experiences, hobbies, age, gender, and more. This allows individuals meeting each other to already have some characteristic in common. These sites usually allow for people who do not know each other to "add" each other as a connection or friend and to send each other messages. This connection can lead to more communication between two individuals. An immense amount of information about the individuals can be found directly on their social network profile. Proving those individuals include plentiful and accurate information about themselves, people in online relationships can find out much about each other by viewing profiles and "about me's". Communication between individuals can become more frequent, thus forming some type of relationship via the internet. This relationship can turn into an acquaintance, a friendship, a romantic relationship, or even a business partnership.

=== Online gaming ===
Online gaming elicits the introduction of many different types of people in one interface. A common type of online game where individuals form relationships is the MMORPG, or a massively multiplayer online role-playing game. Some examples of MMORPGs are World of Warcraft, EverQuest, SecondLife, Final Fantasy Online, and Minecraft (see List of massively multiplayer online role-playing games.) These games enable individuals to create a character that represents them and interact with other characters played by real individuals, while at the same time carrying out the tasks and goals of the actual game.

Online games other than MMORPGs can elicit internet relationships as well. Card games such as poker and board games like Pictionary have been transformed into virtual interfaces that allow an individual to play against people across the internet, as well as chatting with them. Virtual pet sites such as Webkinz and Neopets are another type of popular online game that allow individuals to socialize with other players.

Games create social spaces for people of various ages, with userbases often crossing age brackets. Most of these games enable individuals to chat with each other, as well as form groups and clans. This interaction can lead to further communication, turning into a friendship or romantic relationship.

Digital anthropologist Bonnie Nardi emphasizes the significance of online relationships in the video game "World of Warcraft". Based on participant observation, she observes players that meets on the internet and ended up developing a relationship throughout the process of playing the video game. People from all across the world can meet up in a virtual platform, and even starting a relationship. Technologies has really brought people closer with one another, and creating a great environment. Nardi talks about one of her guild members named Zeke who was engaged to Malore that they met in a dungeon run. "I had not seen that there might be anything other than emoting going on, and told him I was married. Zeke then revealed that he was engaged to Malore (whom he had met in World of Warcraft) but that the relationship was not going well." (Nardi, Page 165) Zeke's relationship Malore happened due to the fact that Zeke had several accounts in the game and apparently he was able to flirt with Malore while using different characters to run down the dungeon with her.

=== Online forums and chatrooms ===
Chatrooms are an online space where people can interact with one another synchronously at either a one-on-one scale or with multiple people. An Internet forum is a website that includes conversations in the form of posted messages. Forums can be for general chatting or can be broken down into categories and topics. They can be used to ask questions, post opinions, or debate topics. Forums include their own jargon, for example a conversation is a "thread". Different forums also have different lingo and styles of communicating.

There are religion forums, music forums, car forums, and countless other topics. These forums elicit communication between individuals no matter the location, gender, ethnicity, etc. although some do include age restrictions. Through these forums people may comment on each other's topics or threads, and with further communication form a friendship, partnership, or romantic relationship.

=== Professional relationships ===
Even in work settings, the introduction of the internet has established easier and sometimes more practical forms of communicating. The internet is often referred to as a vehicle for investor relations or the "electronic highway" for business transactions in the United States. The Internet has increased organizational involvement by facilitating the flow of information between face-to-face meetings and allowing for people to arrange meetings at virtually any given time. Socially, it has stimulated positive change in people's lives by creating new forms of online interaction and enhancing offline relationships worldwide, allowing for better and more efficient business communication.

== Internet relationships and Law ==
The Russian scientist I.M. Rassolov defines internet relations as a type of information relationship that arises, changes and terminates in [cyberspace], with participants acting as bearers of subjective rights and obligations on the Internet.

In his opinion, the specifics of internet relationships are as follows:

1. They cannot exist without complex technical and programming resources, such as information technologies and networks. They have informational content, i.e. they are formed around social information on the Internet.

2. These relationships arise, change and terminate in cyberspace.

3. The participants may be traditional intermediaries of information and commercial information. They may also arise between entities with industry-specific legal personality, such as service providers, domain name registrars and digital platform operators.

4. These relations may be complicated by a foreign element and be formed between citizens of different countries (i.e. they may be transboundary). The persons involved in such relations may be located in different jurisdictions and their activities may be regulated by different legislation.

5. They may involve artificial intelligence, with 'electronic persons' and robots participating indirectly (i.e. acting as "co-participants" or "co-conspirators").

6. These relations emerge at a certain stage in the development of society, the state and technology, with the aim of automating management.

== Advantages ==
For more intimate relationships, research has shown that personal disclosures create a greater sense of intimacy. This gives a sense of trust and equality, which people search for in a relationship, and this is often easier to achieve online than face to face, although not all disclosures are responded to positively. Individuals are able to engage in more self-disclosure than an average interaction, because a person can share their inner thoughts, feelings and beliefs and be met with less disapproval and fewer sanctions online than is the case in face-to-face encounters. Researcher Cooper termed this type of relationship as a "Triple A Engine" implying that internet relationships are accessible, affordable, and anonymous.

Online, barriers that might stand in the way of a potential relationship such as physical attractiveness, social anxiety and stuttering do not exist. Whereas those could hinder an individual in face-to-face encounters, an Internet interaction negates this and allows the individual freedom. Research has shown that stigmas such as these can make a large impact on first impressions in face-to-face meeting, and this does not apply with an online relationship. Furthermore, as the internet has become a worldwide phenomenon, many people can interact with others around the world, or find someone who fits their radar or their type, if there is no one who they find physically or emotionally attractive in their own area. The internet allows for interaction of many different people so there is greater chance of finding someone more attractive. The Internet "enhances face-to-face and telephone communication as network members become more aware of each others' needs and stimulate their relationships through more frequent contact".

According to Joseph Walter's social information processing theory, computer-mediated communications can work for people. While online interactions take roughly four times longer than face-to-face interactions, this gives users the opportunity to evaluate and the time to think, making sure they say the perfect response. Thus, chronemics is the only verbal clue available to digital communications. With the focus on conversation and not appearance, digital interactions over time will develop higher levels of intimacy than face-to-face interactions.

In The Forms of Capital Pierre Bourdieu defines social capital as "the aggregate of the actual or potential resources which are linked to possession of a durable network of more or less institutionalized relationships of mutual acquaintance and recognition."

Social capital researchers have found that "various forms of social capital, including ties with friends and neighbors, are related to indices of psychological well-being, such as self-esteem and satisfaction with life". Then, the use of a social networking service could help to improve the social capital.

More than helping to improve the social capital, the use of a social networking service could help to retain it. For instance, Cummings, Lee and Kraut have shown that communication services like instant messaging "help college students to remain close to their high school friends after they leave home for college".

== Disadvantages ==
The Internet provides the opportunity for misrepresentation, particularly in the early stages of a relationship when commitment is low, and self-presentation and enhancement agendas are paramount. After receiving many complaints about his social networking site Ashley Madison, founder Noel Biderman responded to accusations that his and other similar cyber-dating sites are at fault for the "rising divorce rates and growth in casual dating". Biderman argued that the idea for Ashleymadison.com came to him when he realized the growing number of people on "mainstream dating sites" were married or in a relationship but posing as singles in order to start an affair.

In an empirical study of commitment and misrepresentation on the Internet, Cornwell and Lundgren (2001) surveyed 80 chat-room users. Half about their 'realspace' relationships, and half about their cyberspace relationships. They found that 'realspace' relationships were considered to be more serious, with greater feelings of commitment, than the cyber-relationship participants. Both groups, however, reported similar levels of satisfaction and potential for 'emotional growth' with regard to romantic relationships. Cornwell and Lundgren went on to ask about whether the participants had misrepresented themselves to their partner in a number of areas: their interests (e.g. hobbies, musical tastes); their age; their background; their appearance and 'mis-presentation of yourself in any other way' (p. 203). Participants responded using either yes or no to each question, and their score was summed into a misrepresentation measure. The results can be found below:

=== Dangers of internet relationships ===
An oft-forgotten aspect of online interactions is the possible danger present. The option for an individual to conceal their identity may be harmless in many cases, but it can also lead to extremely dangerous situations. Hidden identities are often used in cases of cyberbullying and cyberstalking. Concealing one's true identity is also a technique that can be used to manipulate the person's new online friend or lover into convincing them that they are someone completely different. This is something most online predators do in order to prey on victims. Despite the awareness of dangers, Mishna et al. found children and youth to still partake in online relationships with little care or concern for negative effects. Brym and Lenton also claim that "although [their] true identities are usually concealed, they sometimes decide to meet and interact in real life".

Engaging in internet relationships is also risky because the information placed online about an individual does not have to be accurate. An individual can formulate an entirely different persona and pose as this person as long as they desire. This can be hurtful to individuals who are honest about their identities and believe that they are in a positive relationship or friendship with the individual. This concept has been most recently illustrated on the television show, Catfish: The TV Show.

Misrepresentation of...	Cyberspace relationship	Realspace relationship
Interests	15%	20%
Age	23%	5%
Background	18%	10%
Physical Characteristics	28%	13%
Other	15%	5%

=== Internet affairs ===
Internet affairs offer a new perspective on the definition of an affair. Some people consider internet relationships to be classified as an affair while others claim contact affairs are much more serious. Trent Parker and Karen Wampler conducted a qualitative study to discover the different perceptions of internet relationships based on gender differences. Through their study they found internet affairs were considered less of an affair than a physical relationship. Through the results from the same study Parker and Wampler also concluded that women considered sexual internet activities such as internet porn much more severe than the men did. Internet affairs and physical contact affairs are similar because they both involve another partner. "The primary difference between an internet affair and an affair is that in an affair, the couple meet to engage in the relationship. With internet affairs, on the other hand, the couple rarely meet. This offers a unique advantage to internet affairs."

== Effects on face-to-face interactions ==
Since the creation of the Internet, communication has become one of its prime uses. It has become a ubiquitous force in people's everyday lives due to the increase in the regularity and quality of interaction. The internet has also created a new approach to human relationships, and it has changed the way people connect to one another in their social worlds. Online relationships have also changed which effective strategies we use to perform maintenance on our relationships, depending on the exclusivity of the internet the relationship. In the past, postal services made communication possible without the necessity of physical presence, and the invention of the telephone allowed synchronous communication between people across long distances. The internet combined the advantages of both mail and telephone, unifying the speed of the telephone with the written character of the mail service. The evolution of communication within the Internet has arguably changed the nature of individuals' relationships with one another.

Some see a major negative impact resulting in an increased use of internet communication is of its diversion of true community because online interaction via computers is often regarded as a more impersonal communication medium than face-to-face communication. Others consider the incorporation of the internet allowing online activities to be "viewed as an extension of offline activities". The multiple techniques that humans use to communicate, such as taking turns or nodding in agreement, are absent in these settings. Without the body language cues present in a face-to-face conversation, such as pauses or gestures, participants in instant messaging may type over one another's messages without necessarily waiting for a cue to talk. Also, with or without the correct grammar, tone and context can be misunderstood. Recently people who already adapted internet-based communication have missed face-to-face interactions because this traditional way of communication is able to offer advancement in our relationships.

=== Early positive view ===
In 1991, Stone argued that when virtual communities began forming, this process generated a new type of social space where people could still apparently meet face-to-face, but this required a redefinition of the terms "meet" and "face-to-face." These virtual communities allowed people to effortlessly access others, and in many ways to feel better connected, feel that they receive greater support from others, and to obtain emotional satisfaction from their families, communities and society. However, it does have several obvious problems for people to communicate with others. The representative limitation of this way of communications is that it cannot contain people's diverse emotions completely, so it can cause diverse misunderstanding between people.

=== Pseudocommunity theory ===
In 1987, this understanding of social spaces was challenged by scholars such as James R. Beniger. Beniger questioned whether these virtual communities were "real" or were pseudo communities, "a pattern relating that, while looking highly interpersonal interaction, is essentially impersonal." He put forward the idea that in a society within the virtual world, participants lack the necessary honesty it would take to create a "real" virtual community.

=== Weakening of social ties ===
In many cases the introduction of the Internet as a social instigator may cause a repercussion leading to a weakening of social ties. In a study conducted in 1998, Robert Kraut et al. discovered that Internet users were becoming less socially involved. They linked this to an increase in loneliness and depression in relation to use of the Internet. Though these findings may have been sound, in a later study, Kraut et al. revisited his original study with the idea of expanding his current initial sample and correlating it with new subsequently collected longitudinal data. This synthesis produced a different outcome than the one that Kraut had originally presented. The studies like Sexual Addiction and Compulsivity report (2000) indicate that people who are constantly practicing virtual sexual stimulation losing the social stigma and approval that they experience problems

In this newer paper, Kraut stated that there were fewer negative affects than he had originally found, and in some cases the negative effect had vanished. In the second study he saw that small positive effects began to appear in social involvement and psychological well-being. Assessing the effect of the Internet over a period of time, he saw people's use of the Internet increase in sophistication.

During the Kraut et al. study, the researchers asked reclusive people if they use the Internet to counteract the loss of social skills that are needed in face-to-face encounters. They also asked people with strong social skills whether they use the Internet to amplify their abilities to network amongst people. The study discovered that these people who already possessed strong social skills were the ones who received the most beneficial outcome to using the Internet. The concluding analysis was, that rather than helping to decrease the difference between those who already had social skills compared with those lacking in social skills, internet use had actually exacerbated the differences in the skill level needed for social interaction.

=== Assisting reclusive people ===
This theory was later challenged in a study, by McKenna et al., that indicated that people who are more socially inept use the internet to create an initial contact which allows them to explore their "true self" within these interactions. These social interactions within cyberspace tend to lead to closer and high quality relationships which influence face-to-face encounters. In essence, these findings meant that although it is not clear whether the internet helps reclusive people develop better social skills, it does allow reclusive people to form relationships that may not have existed otherwise because of their lack of comfort with interpersonal situations in general. When these relationships emerge into face-to-face relationships it is hard to distinguish these relationships from those that started as face-to-face interactions. Future studies on this topic may allow scholars to define whether or not society is becoming too dependent on the Internet as a social tool. Those relationships are also found for people suffering from depression, suicidal ideation and other mental health problems. For example, suicidal people were more likely to go online in search of new interpersonal relationships and to seek interpersonal help. Similar findings were found for suicidal LGBT. These studies show that people who have trouble meeting similar others, not only the 'socially inept', are using the internet to create stronger and more extensive interpersonal relationships.

== See also ==
- Pen pal
- Social networking service
- Robert Kraut
- Harry Reis
