= Mamdouh Shoukri =

Egyptian-American university administrator

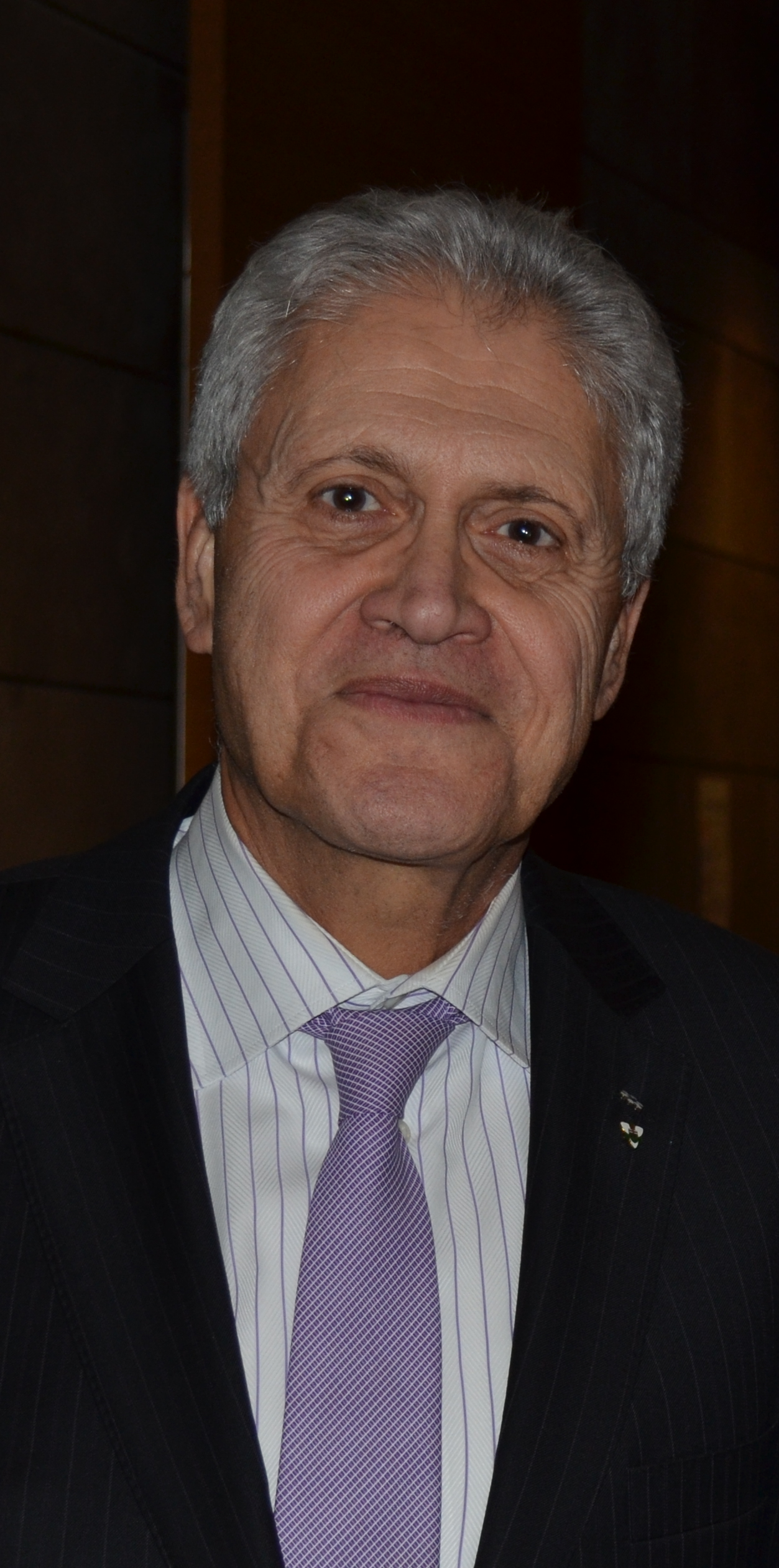
- Shoukri in 2014

7th President of York University
- In office 1 July 2007 – 1 July 2017
- Preceded by: Lorna Marsden
- Succeeded by: Rhonda Lenton

Personal details
- Born: September 17, 1947 (age 79) Cairo, Egypt
- Website: www.yorku.ca/president

Mamdouh Shoukri, CM OOnt was the seventh President and Vice-Chancellor of York University, serving two terms from 2007 to 2017. His first term began on July 1, 2007, and on April 25, 2011, the Board of Governors of York University announced his renewal for a second term.

== Biography ==
Born near Cairo, Egypt, Shoukri began his career in academia at McMaster University in Hamilton, Ontario, where he joined the faculty in 1984. In 1990, he was appointed Chair of the Mechanical Engineering Department, and eventually became Dean of the Faculty of Engineering from 1994-2001. During his term as Dean, the Engineering Faculty enjoyed significant growth, which paved the way for McMaster to become one of the leading engineering schools in Canada. Shoukri then went on to serve as Vice-President Research & International Affairs. Under his leadership, McMaster was designated Research University of the Year in 2004 by Research Infosource Inc. He was also responsible for creating and implementing the vision for the McMaster Innovation Park (MIP), by building partnerships with the provincial and federal governments, the City of Hamilton, the community and local industry.

Prior to joining McMaster, Shoukri started his career in the Research Division of Ontario Hydro (1977–1984), where he was responsible for industrial research.

In addition to his roles at York, Shoukri serves on the Ministry of Industry’s Space Advisory Board, the Boards of Directors of Universities Canada and the Loran Scholars Foundation, and is Chair of the Government and Community Relations Committee for the Council of Ontario Universities. He is a member of the Standing Advisory Committee on University Research (SACUR) for Universities Canada, and was a founding Board Member of the Ontario Centres of Excellence (OCE) and a member of the Ontario Research and Innovation Council (ORIC).

He is a Senior Fellow of Massey College, and a Fellow of the Canadian Academy of Engineering and the Canadian Society for Mechanical Engineering. His professional memberships include the Association of Professional Engineers of Ontario, the Canadian Nuclear Society and the American Society of Mechanical Engineers. Shoukri's scholarly interests are in thermo-fluid science, and he is the author or co-author of more than 120 papers that have appeared in refereed journals and symposia.

In 2013, he was named a Member of the Order of Ontario. On December 30, 2013, it was announced that Shoukri had been appointed a Member of the Order of Canada "for his contributions to the flourishing of Ontario’s academic institutions as both an engineer and an administrator". He was also awarded the Queen Elizabeth II Diamond Jubilee medal.
