= York University =

Public university in Ontario, Canada

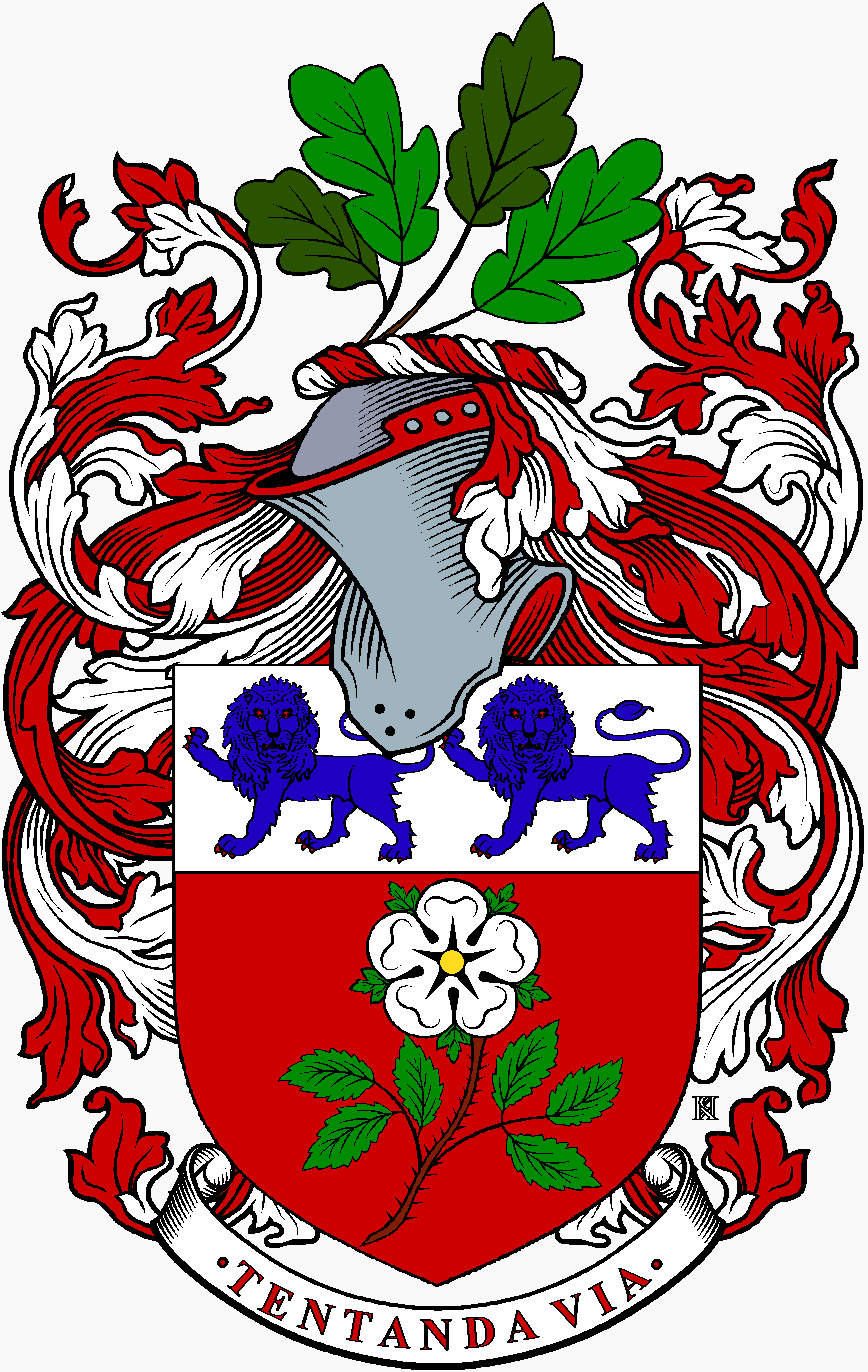
- Coat of arms of the university
- Other name: Université York (French)
- Motto: Tentanda via (Latin)
- Motto in English: "The way must be tried"
- Type: Public research university
- Established: 1959; 67 years ago
- Academic affiliations: COU; IAU; Universities Canada
- Endowment: $615.0 million (2023)
- Chancellor: Kathleen Taylor
- President: Lisa Philipps (interim)
- Provost: Laina Bay-Cheng (interim)
- Administrative staff: 7,000
- Students: 55,700
- Undergraduates: 49,700
- Postgraduates: 6,000
- Location: Toronto, Ontario, Canada; 43°46′23″N 79°30′13″W
- Language: English; Bilingual (Glendon only)
- Campuses: Keele: urban, 185 ha (460 acres); Glendon: suburban, 34.4 ha (85 acres); Markham: suburban
Colours
Red and White
- Nickname: Lions
- Sporting affiliations: U Sports – OUA
- Mascot: Yeo the Lion
- Website: www.yorku.ca

York University (York U, YU, or simply York; French: Université York) is a public research university based in Toronto, Ontario, Canada. It is Canada's third-largest university, with approximately 53,500 students, 7,000 faculty and staff, and over 375,000 alumni worldwide. It has 11 faculties, including the Lassonde School of Engineering, Schulich School of Business, Osgoode Hall Law School, Glendon College, and 32 research centres.

York University was established in 1959 as a non-denominational institution by the York University Act, which received royal assent in the Legislative Assembly of Ontario on 26 March of that year. Its first class was held in September 1960 in Falconer Hall on the St. George campus of the University of Toronto with a total of 76 students. In the fourth quarter of 1961, York moved to its first campus at Glendon Hall (now part of Glendon College), which was leased from the University of Toronto, and began to emphasize liberal arts and part-time adult education. In 1965, the university opened a second campus, the Keele Campus, in North York, within the neighbourhood community now called York University Heights. York opened its Markham Campus to its first full cohort of students in September 2024.

Over the last twenty years, York has become a centre for labour strife with several faculty and other strikes occurring, including the longest university strike in Canadian history in 2018.

== History ==
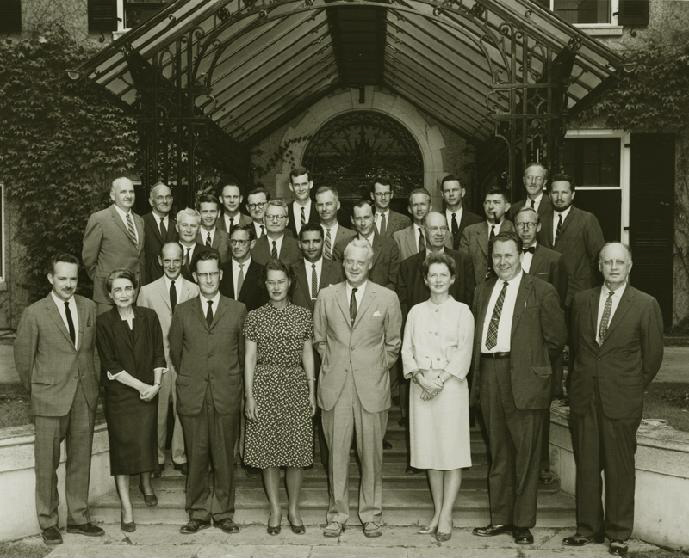
York University Faculty Members, 1961

York University was established in 1959 as a non-denominational institution by the York University Act, which received royal assent in the Legislative Assembly of Ontario on 26 March of that year. Its first class was held in September 1960 in Falconer Hall on the University of Toronto St. George campus with a total of 76 students.

The policy of university education initiated in the 1960s responded to population pressure and the belief that higher education was a key to social justice and economic productivity for individuals and for society. The governance was modelled on the provincial University of Toronto Act of 1906, which established a bicameral system of university government consisting of a senate (faculty), responsible for academic policy, and a board of governors (citizens) exercising exclusive control over financial policy and having formal authority in all other matters. The president, appointed by the board, was to provide a link between the two bodies and to perform institutional leadership.

In the fourth quarter of 1961, York moved to its first campus, Glendon College, and began to emphasize liberal arts and part-time adult education. York became independent in 1965, after an initial period of affiliation with the University of Toronto (U of T), under the York University Act, 1965. Its main campus on the northern outskirts of Toronto opened in 1965.

Murray Ross, who continues to be honoured today at the university in several ways – including the Murray G. Ross (Valedictorian) Award – was still vice-president of U of T when he was approached to become York University's new president. At the time, York University was envisaged as a feeder campus to U of T, until Ross's powerful vision led it to become a completely separate institution.

In 1965, the university opened a second campus, the Keele Campus, in North York, in the Jane and Finch community. The Glendon campus became a bilingual liberal arts college led by Escott Reid, who envisaged it as a national institution to educate Canada's future leaders, a vision shared by Prime Minister Lester Pearson, who formally opened Glendon College in 1966.

In 1971, Lakeshore Teachers' College affiliated with York. It was merged into the Faculty of Education in 1975.

The first Canadian undergraduate program in dance opened at York University in 1970. In 1972, Canada Post featured the nascent institution on 8¢ stamps, entitled York University Campus, North York, Ont. The first Canadian PhD program in women's studies opened with five candidates in January 1992.

Its bilingual mandate and focus on the liberal arts continue to shape Glendon's special status within York University. The new Keele Campus was regarded as somewhat isolated, in a generally industrialized part of the city. Petrol storage facilities are still across the street. Some of the early architecture was unpopular with many, not only for the brutalist designs, but the vast expanses between buildings, which was not viewed as suitable for the climate. In the last two decades, the campus has been intensified with new buildings, including a dedicated student centre and new fine arts, computer science and business administration buildings, a small shopping mall, and a hockey arena. Sobeys Stadium, a tennis stadium built in 2004, is a perennial host of the Canadian Open. As Toronto has spread further out, York has found itself in a relatively central location within the built-up Greater Toronto Area (GTA), and in particular, near the Jane and Finch neighbourhood. Its master plan envisages a denser on-campus environment commensurate with that location. Students occupied the university's administration offices in March 1997, protesting escalating tuition hikes.

In June 2014, the university announced that a new campus would be constructed in Markham, Ontario. The campus will be built near Highway 407, between Kennedy Road and Warden Avenue in partnership with Seneca College. The new campus would house approximately 4,200 students and is anticipated to accommodate up to 10,000 students in future phases. On 20 May 2015, the provincial government announced it will provide financial contribution to this new project. On 24 October 2018, the provincial government announced it would pull its funding for the campus, along with funding for the planned satellite campuses of Laurier University and Toronto Metropolitan University (then Ryerson University). After this cancellation of funding for the Markham project, York University and its partners planned to seek alternative funding. In July 2020, the provincial government allowed plans for the university to go through. The Markham Campus opened for the fall session in September 2024.

== Campuses ==
=== Keele Campus ===
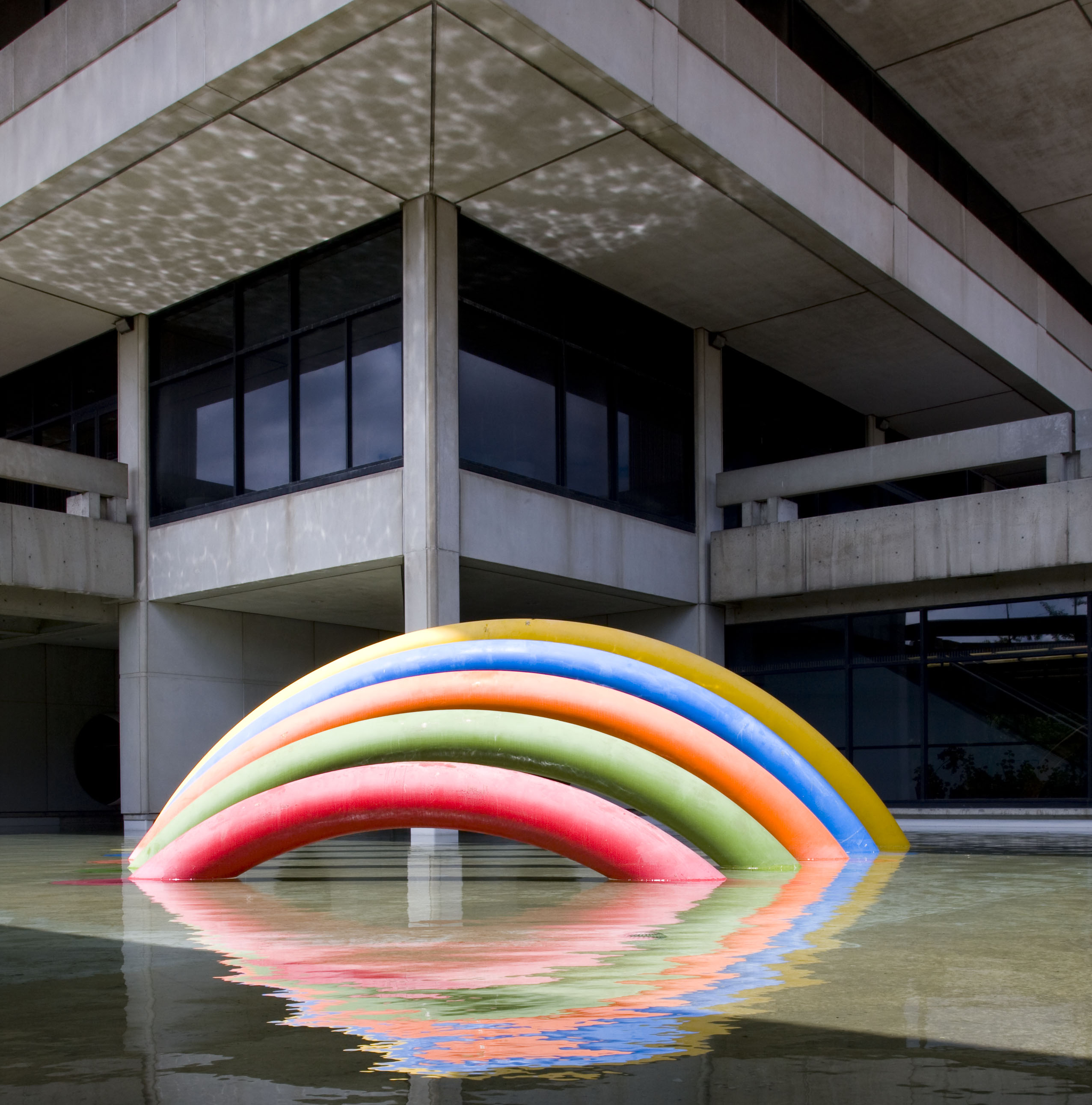
An outdoor art exhibit outside of Scott Library, Keele Campus

The Keele Campus is the main campus of York University and is located in northern Toronto bordering York Region. Most of the university's faculties reside here, including Liberal Arts, Fine Arts, Business, Law, Environmental Studies, Science and Engineering, Education, and Health. All together, nearly 50,000 students attend classes on the Keele campus. York University station and Pioneer Village Station are two Toronto subway stations located on Keele campus. Other transit options on campus include Brampton Transit (Züm) and York Region transit (YRT).

=== Glendon Campus ===
Glendon College is a bilingual liberal arts faculty and separate campus of York University. Glendon College is home to the Leslie Frost library.

=== Markham Campus ===
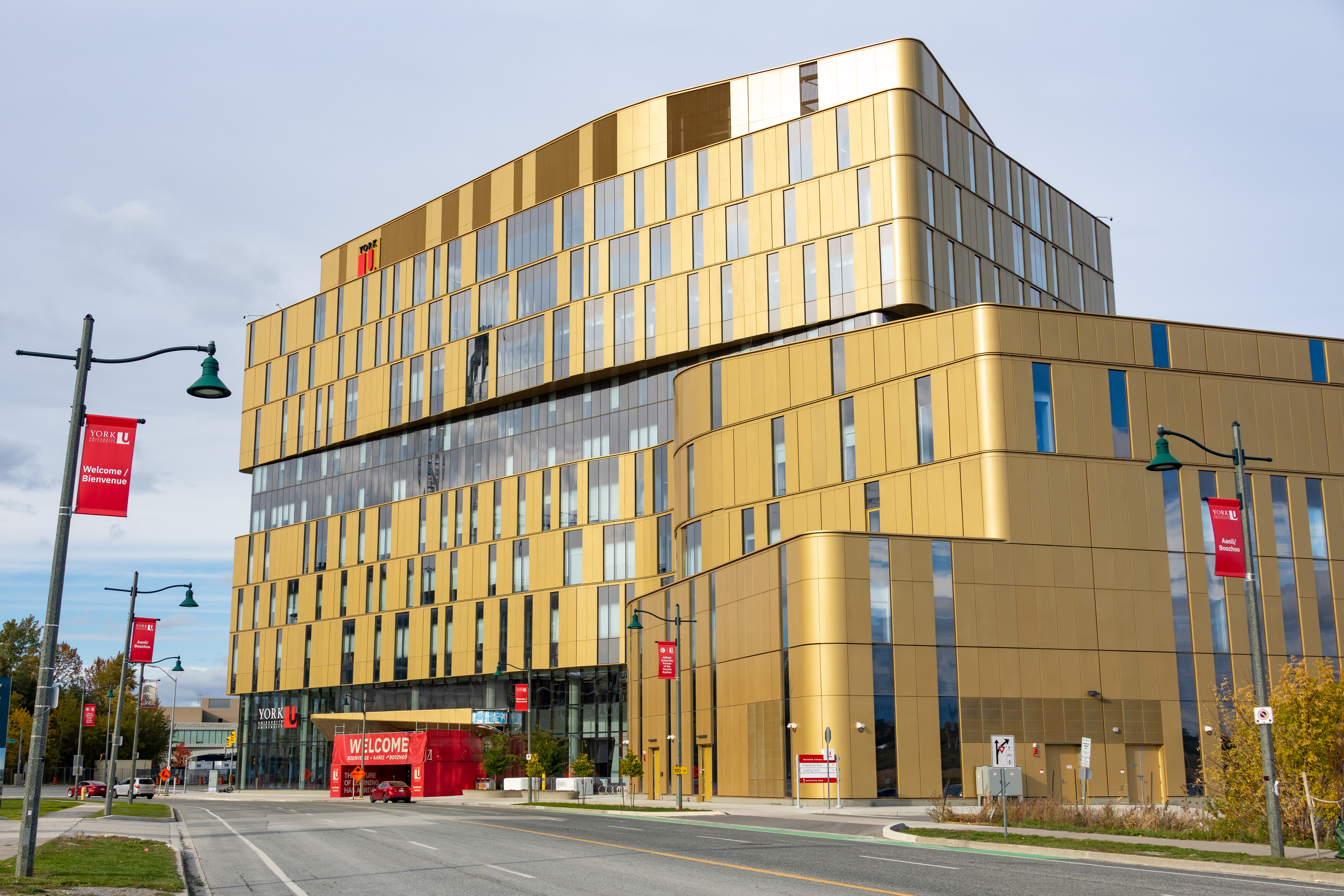
York University's Markham campus in 2025

In 2018, York University announced a proposal to construct a third campus in the City of Markham. The Government of Ontario supported to partially fund the construction and was announced by Premier Doug Ford on 23 July 2020. The Markham Campus was due to open in the second quarter of 2024, but officially opened in September 2024.

The campus currently hosts over 1,000 students, with capacity projected to be up to 4,200 students over the next several years. Markham is the first public university campus in York Region.

The campus hosts programs in arts and media, IT, liberal arts, environmental studies, engineering, science, and business.

York University is projected to recover its capital investment in the new campus by 2038.

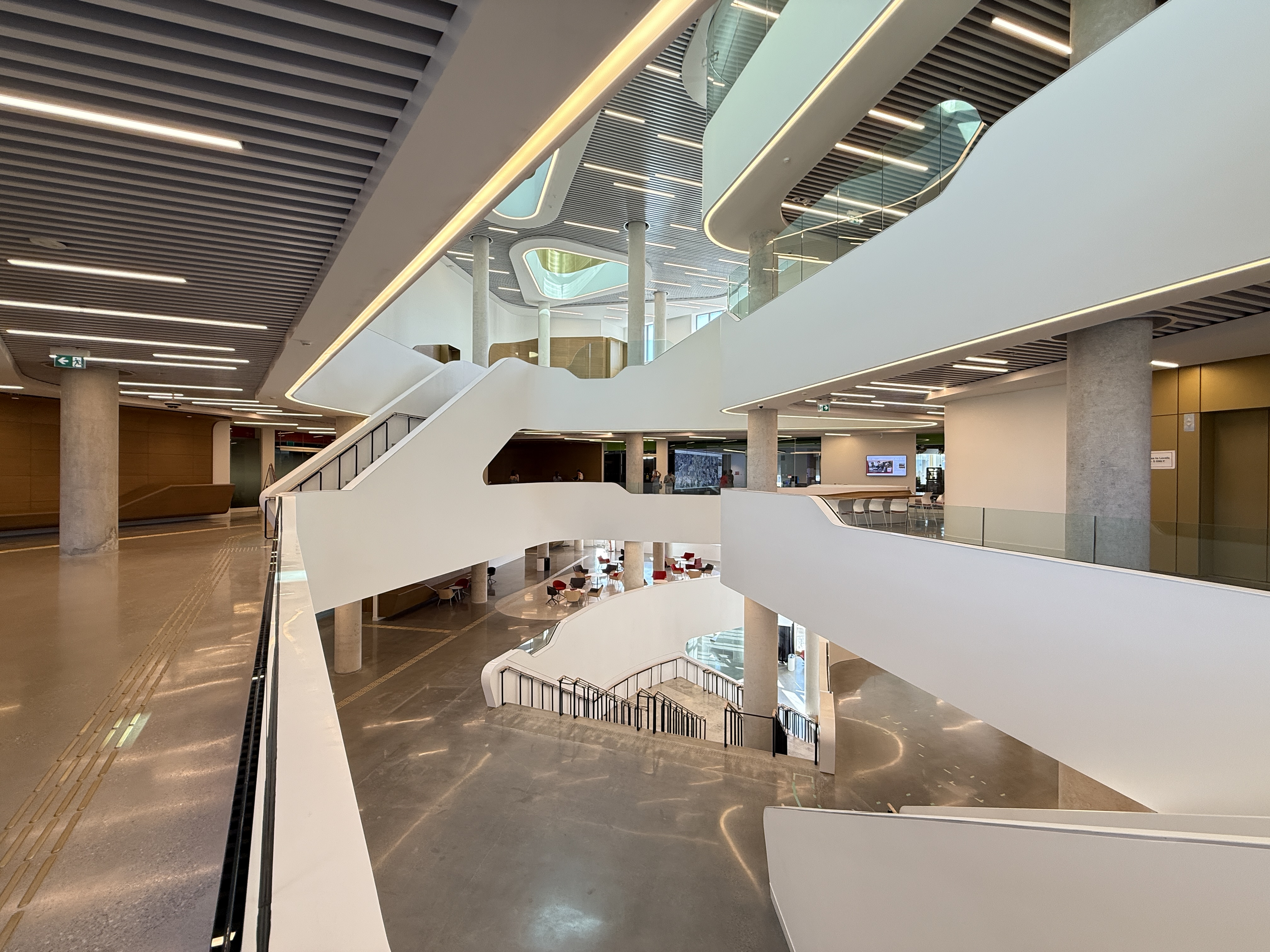
Atrium

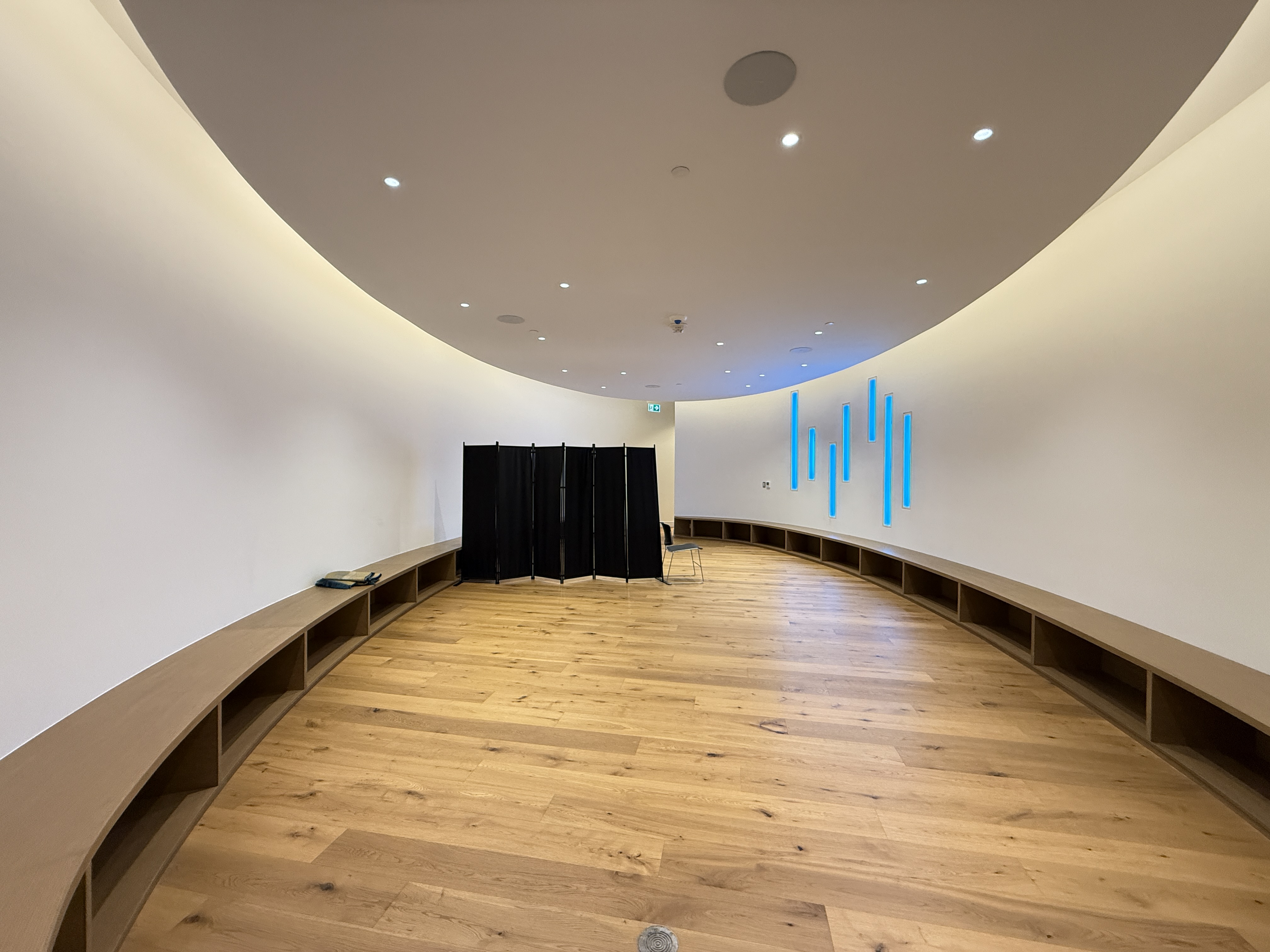
Level 2 Multifaith/Spiritual Reflection Room

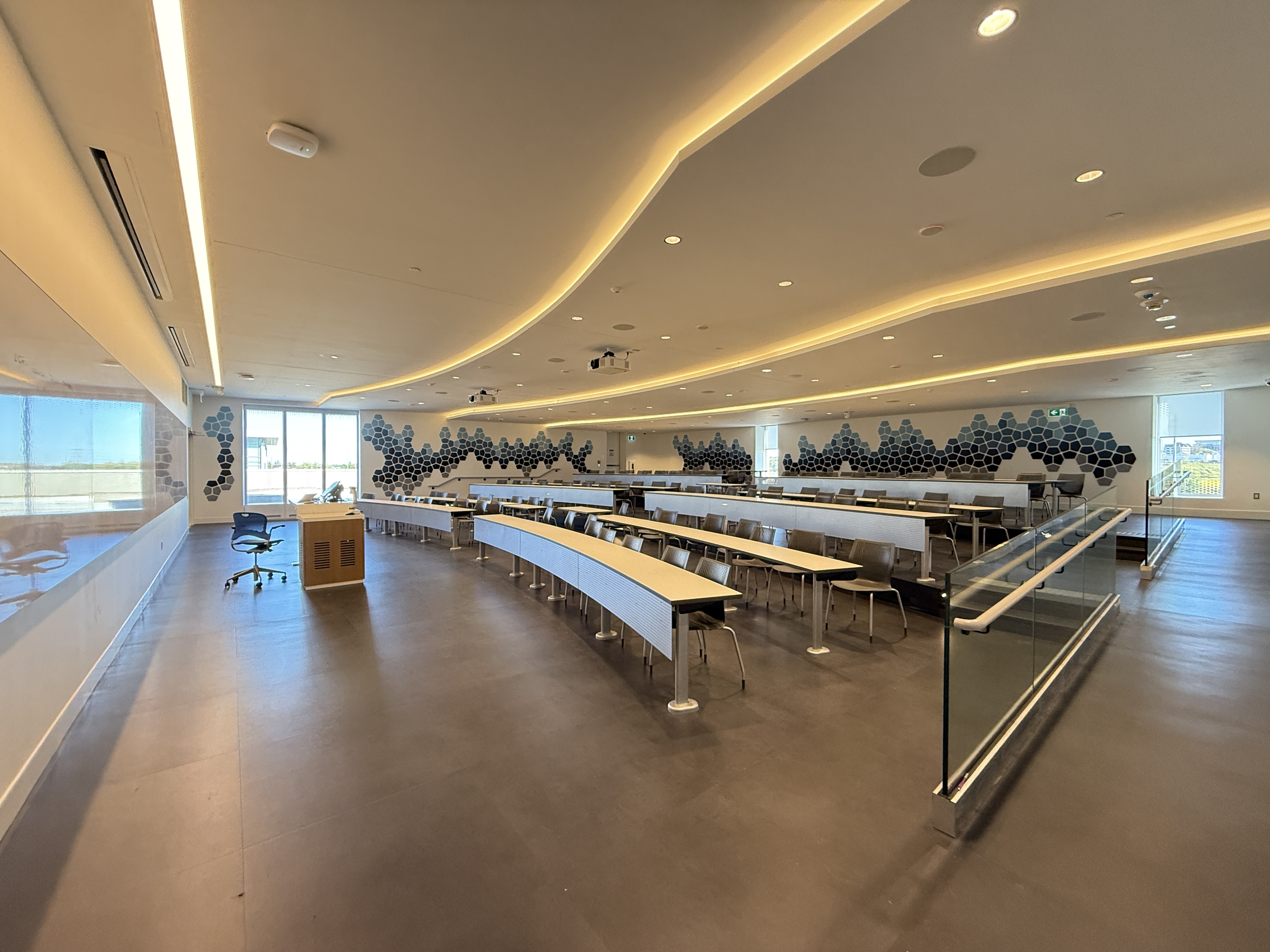
Level 2 Lecture theatre

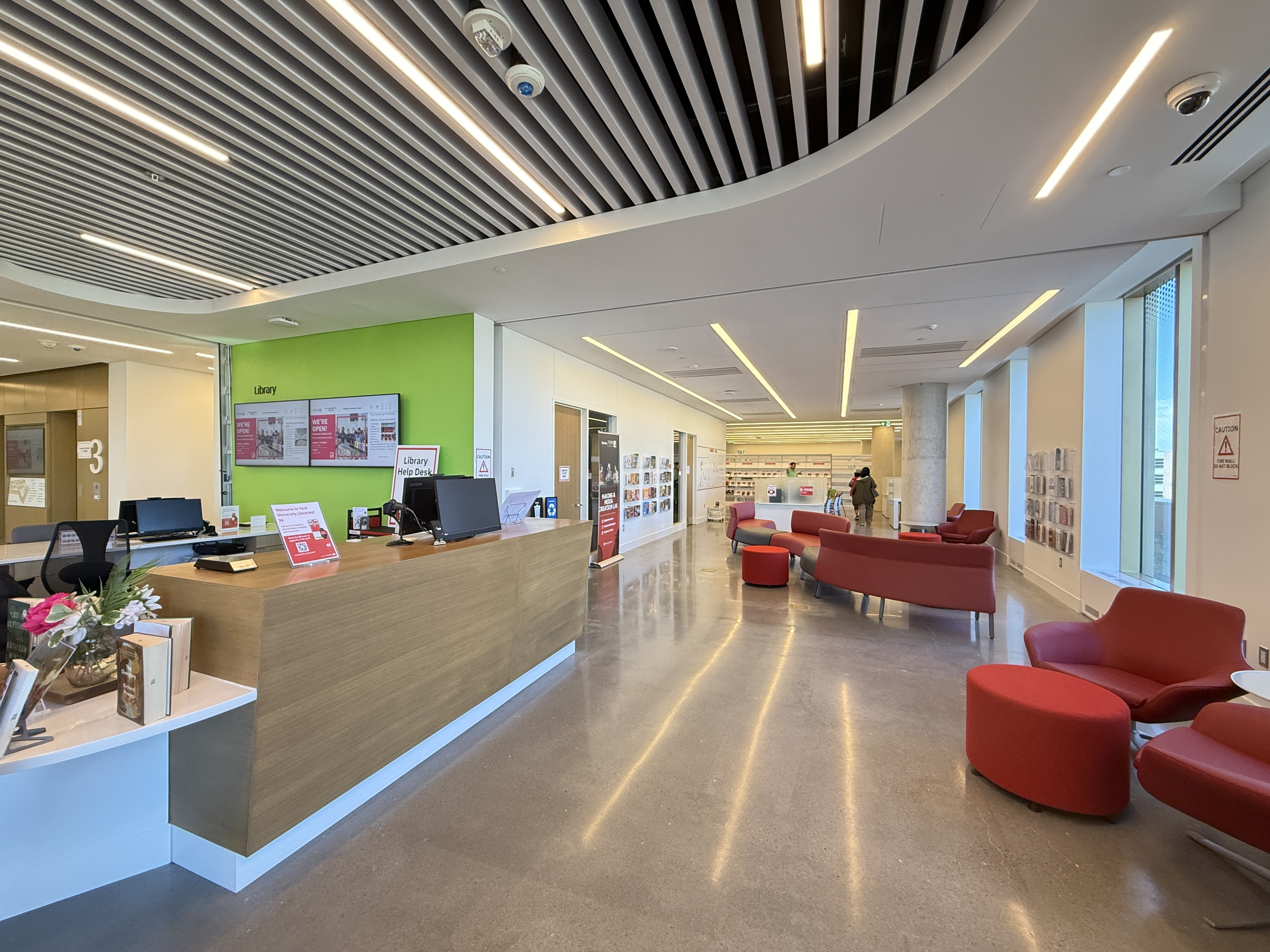
Level 3 Library

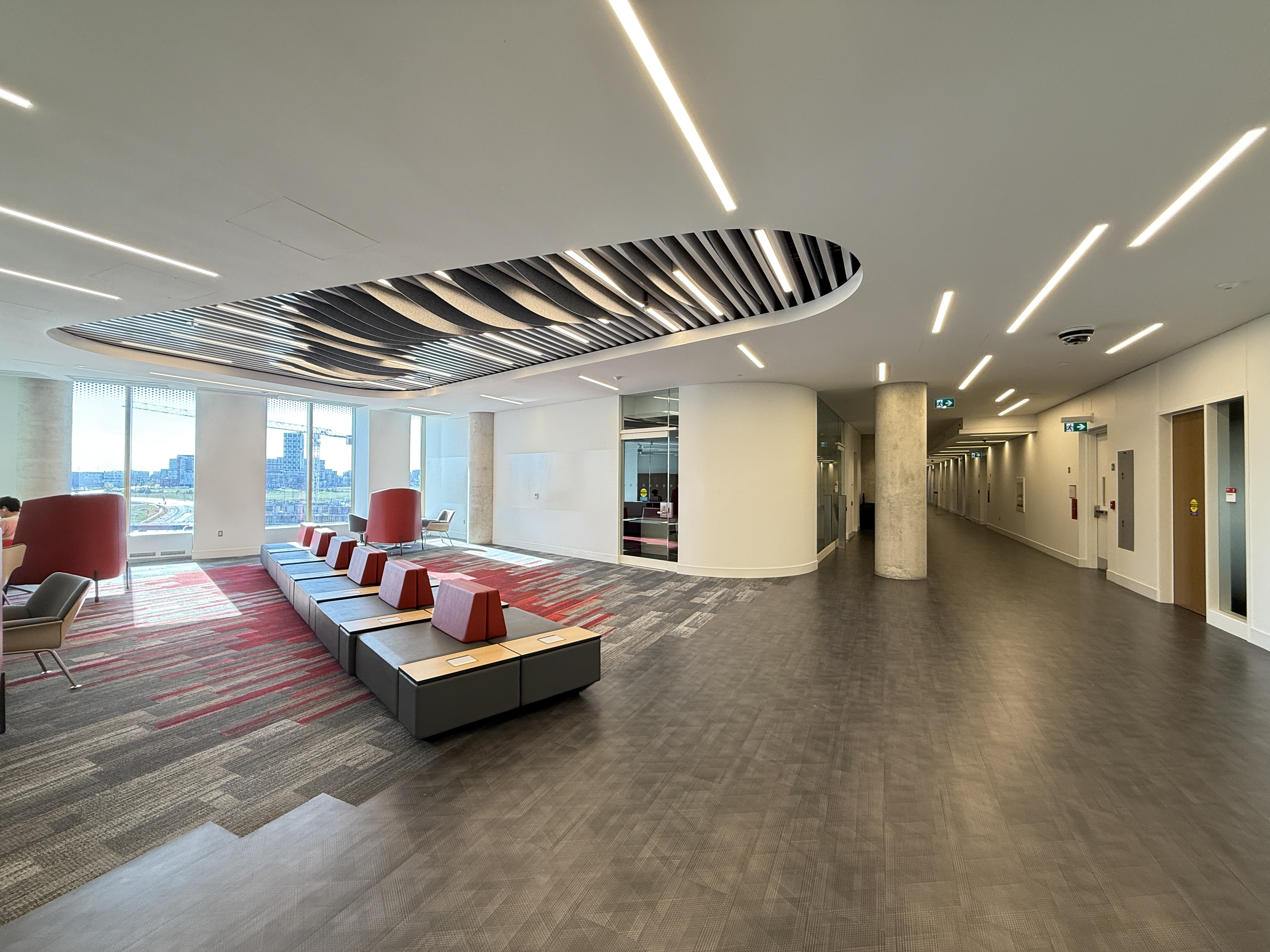
Level 4 common area

=== Other locations ===
While most of the Schulich School of Business and Osgoode Hall Law School programs are offered at the Keele Campus, both of them maintain satellite facilities in downtown Toronto. Schulich operates the Miles S. Nadal Management Centre at 222 Bay Street (EY Tower within the Toronto-Dominion Centre), while Osgoode Hall has a Professional Development Centre at One Dundas West Tower within the Toronto Eaton Centre.

Faculty of Environmental and Urban Change's Lillian Meighen Wright Centre is billed as an eco campus next to Las Nubes Forest Reserve in Costa Rica.

The Schulich School of Business operates a co-campus with GMR School of Business at Rajiv Gandhi International Airport in Hyderabad, India.

In 2024, the Government of Ontario provided $9 million initial start-up funding to establish the York University School of Medicine that will be located in the Vaughan Healthcare Centre Precinct (VHCP) adjacent to Cortellucci Vaughan Hospital in Vaughan. York will be the third medical school in the Greater Toronto Area, joining Toronto Metropolitan University (formerly Ryerson University) and the University of Toronto. In April 2024, it was announced that the York University School of Medicine will accept 80 undergraduate students and 102 postgraduate residents at doors open in 2028, expanding to 240 undergraduate students and 293 postgraduate residents across all years once operating at full capacity.

== Academics ==
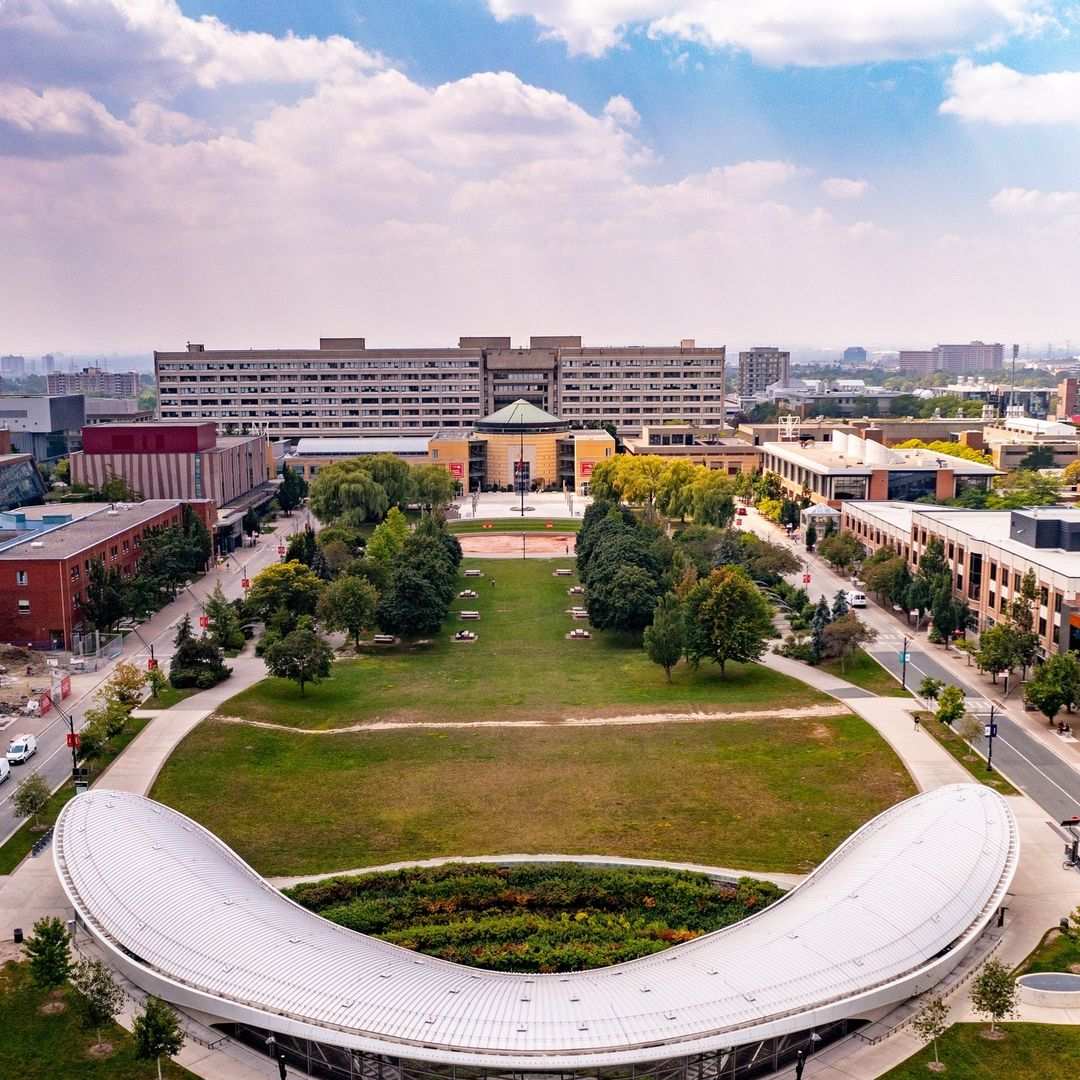
York University Campus

York's approximately 1500 full-time faculty and academic librarians and archivists are represented by the York University Faculty Association. Contract faculty, teaching assistants, and graduate assistants are represented by CUPE Local 3903.

York University has over 120 undergraduate programs with 17 degree types (BA, iBA, BHS, BSc, iBSc, BBA, iBBA, BEng, BES, BDes, BPA, BFA, BCom, BEd, BDEM, BHRM, BScN, BSW) and offers over 170 degree options. They admit to 30 international degrees offering international language study and opportunities to study abroad at more than 100 international universities. Its international students represent over 150 countries around the world.

=== Rankings and reputation ===
University rankings

World rankings
- ARWU World: 601-700
- QS World: 322
- THE World: 401–500
- USNWR World: 530

Canadian rankings
- QS National: 14
- THE National: 18
- USNWR National: 17
- Maclean's Comprehensive: 5
- Maclean's Reputation: 15

York University has been ranked in a number of post-secondary rankings. The 2027 QS World University Rankings ranked the university 322nd in the world and 14th in Canada. The 2025 Times Higher Education World University Rankings ranked York 401–500 in the world and 18th in Canada. In 2025, York ranked 38th globally and 7th in Canada in the Times Higher Education Impact Rankings for Sustainable Development. The 2024 Academic Ranking of World Universities ranking placed York in the 401-500 global bracket and tied for 17th in Canada. In the 2024–25 U.S. News & World Report Best Global University Ranking, the university ranked 466th in the world, and 17th in Canada. The Canadian-based Maclean's magazine ranked York University 4th in their 2024 Canadian comprehensive university category.

The university's research performance has been noted in several bibliometric university rankings, which uses citation analysis to evaluates the impact a university has on academic publications. The 2019 Performance Ranking of Scientific Papers for World Universities and the University Ranking by Academic Performance both ranked the university 488th in the world, and the former additionally ranked it 19th in Canada.

York University has also been featured in rankings that evaluates the employment prospects of its graduates. In QS's 2022 graduate employability ranking, the university ranked 301–500 in the world.

=== Admissions ===
According to Maclean's data for 2025, York's average entering grade was 84.1%.

York University's overall acceptance rate is 57%, making the school moderately selective. The average acceptance rate for specific schools and programs is more selective, with the Osgoode Hall Law School at 25-30% and the Schulich School of Business at 30-40%.

=== Faculties ===
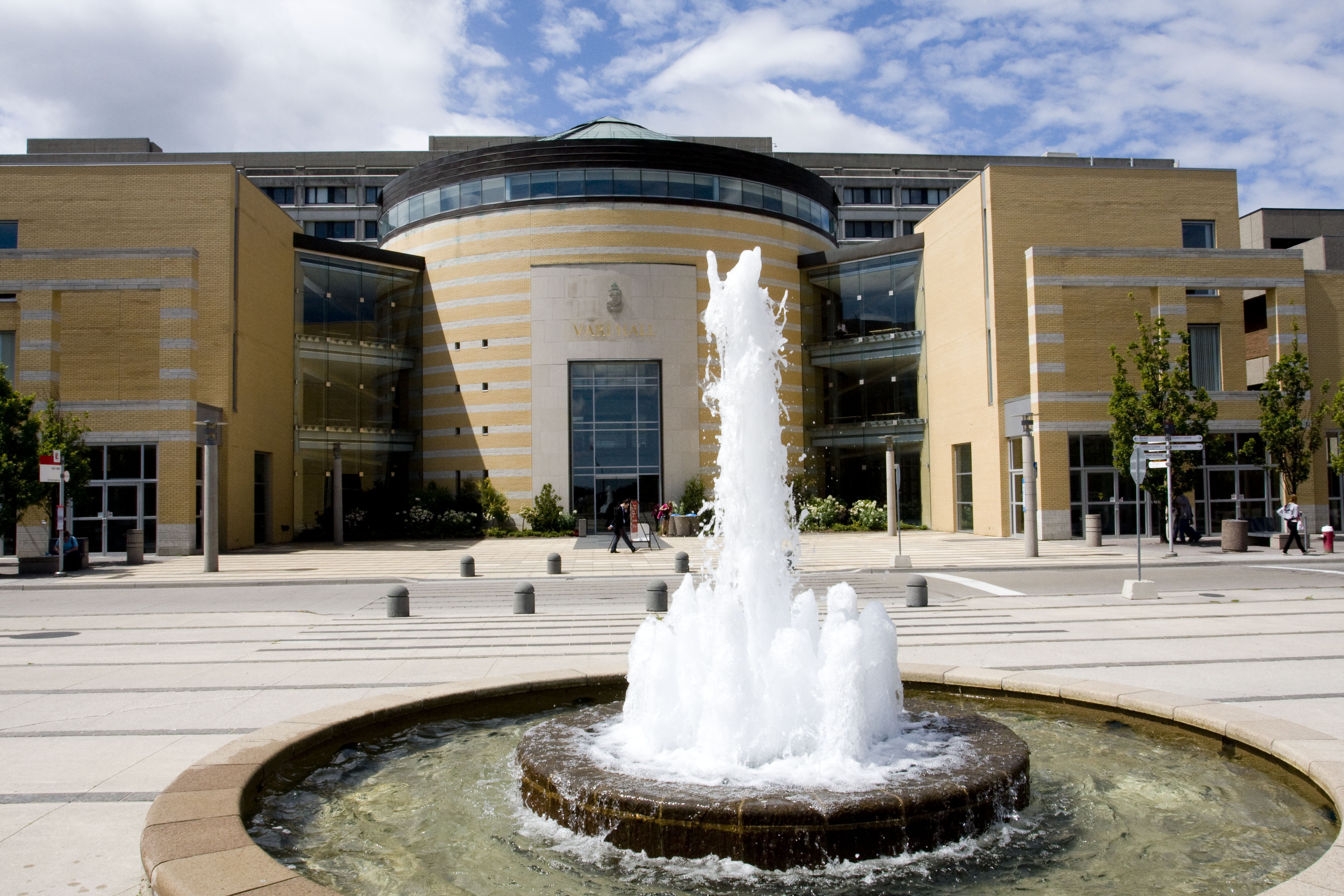
View of Vari Hall from Harry W. Arthurs Common

York University currently has 11 faculties: the School of Arts, Media, Performance & Design, the Faculty of Education, the Faculty of Environmental & Urban Change, Glendon College, the Faculty of Graduate Studies, the Faculty of Health, the Lassonde School of Engineering, the Faculty of Liberal Arts & Professional Studies, Osgoode Hall Law School, the Schulich School of Business, and the Faculty of Science.

York University's Film Department houses Canada's oldest film school and has been ranked one of the best in Canada, with an acceptance rate comparable to that of USC School of Cinematic Arts and Tisch School of the Arts.

The Faculty of Environmental & Urban Change is the oldest and largest environmental studies faculty in Canada. From 1999 to 2018, York University offered the first and largest graphic design program in Ontario York/Sheridan Design (YSDN). It was a four-year University degree delivered jointly by the two leading educational institutions of design in Canada (York University and Sheridan College). The joint program has been discontinued and beginning with the class entering in 2019, four-year design students will enrol in a new Bachelor of Design offered by York University, one which is geared for the future of the profession.

Osgoode Hall Law School moved from a downtown location to the York campus in 1969, after the Ontario government mandated that every law school affiliate with a university. Osgoode Hall offers a number of joint and combined programs.

==== Research centres and institutes ====
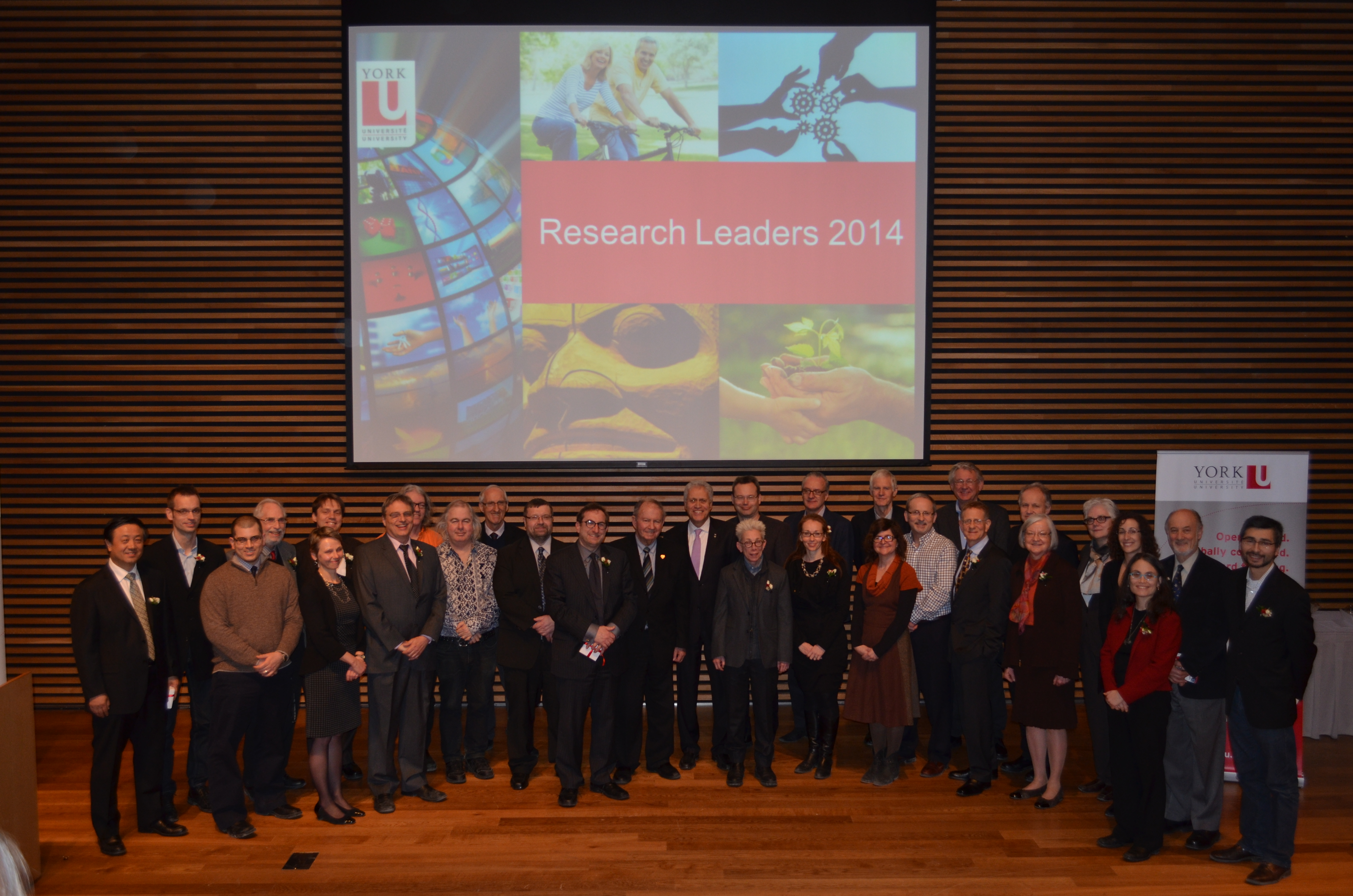
York researchers at the York University Research Leaders 2014 event.

York University is home to 32 organized research units that provide research development beyond the traditional academic units and faculties:

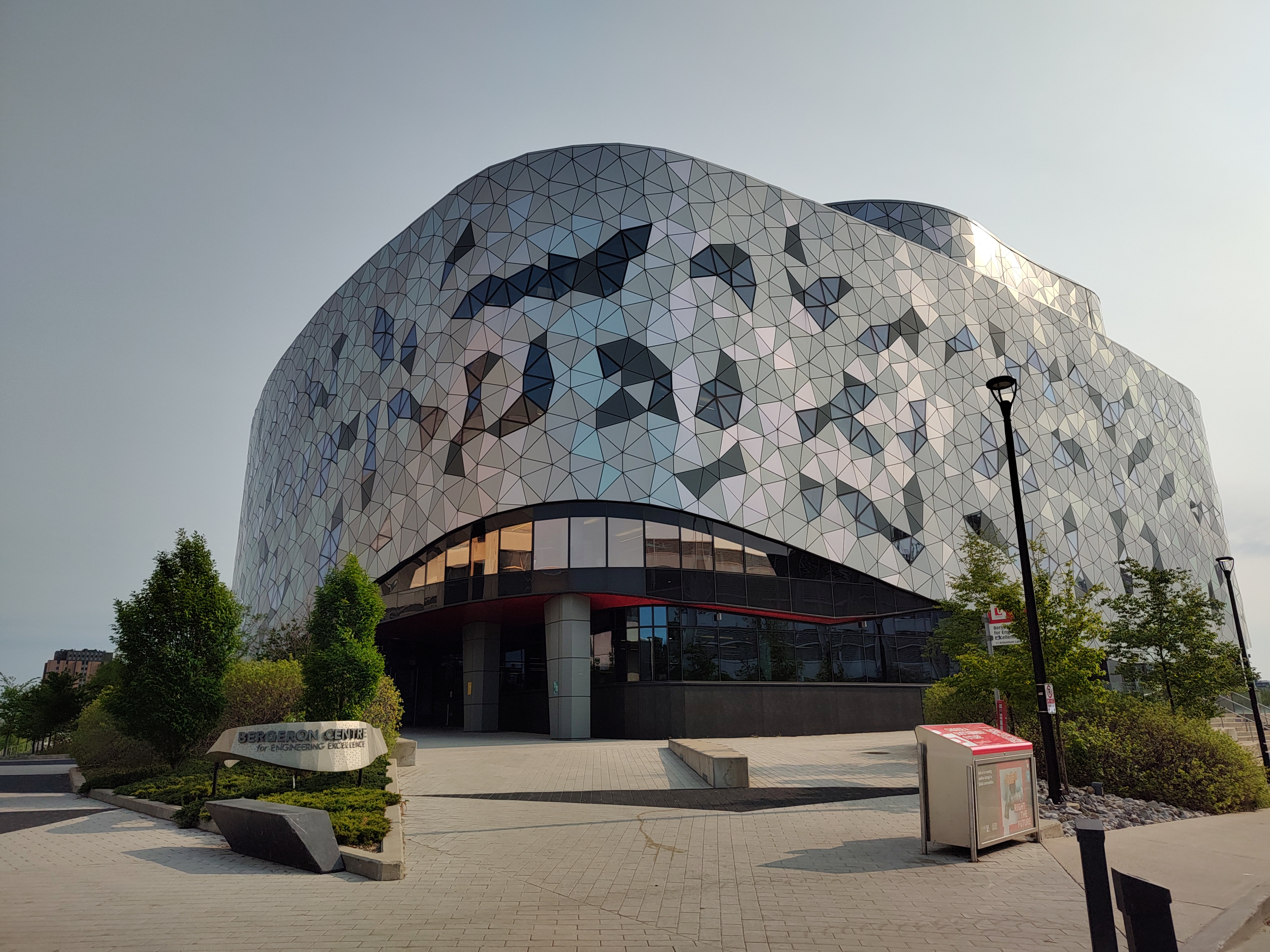
Bergeron Centre For Engineering Excellence

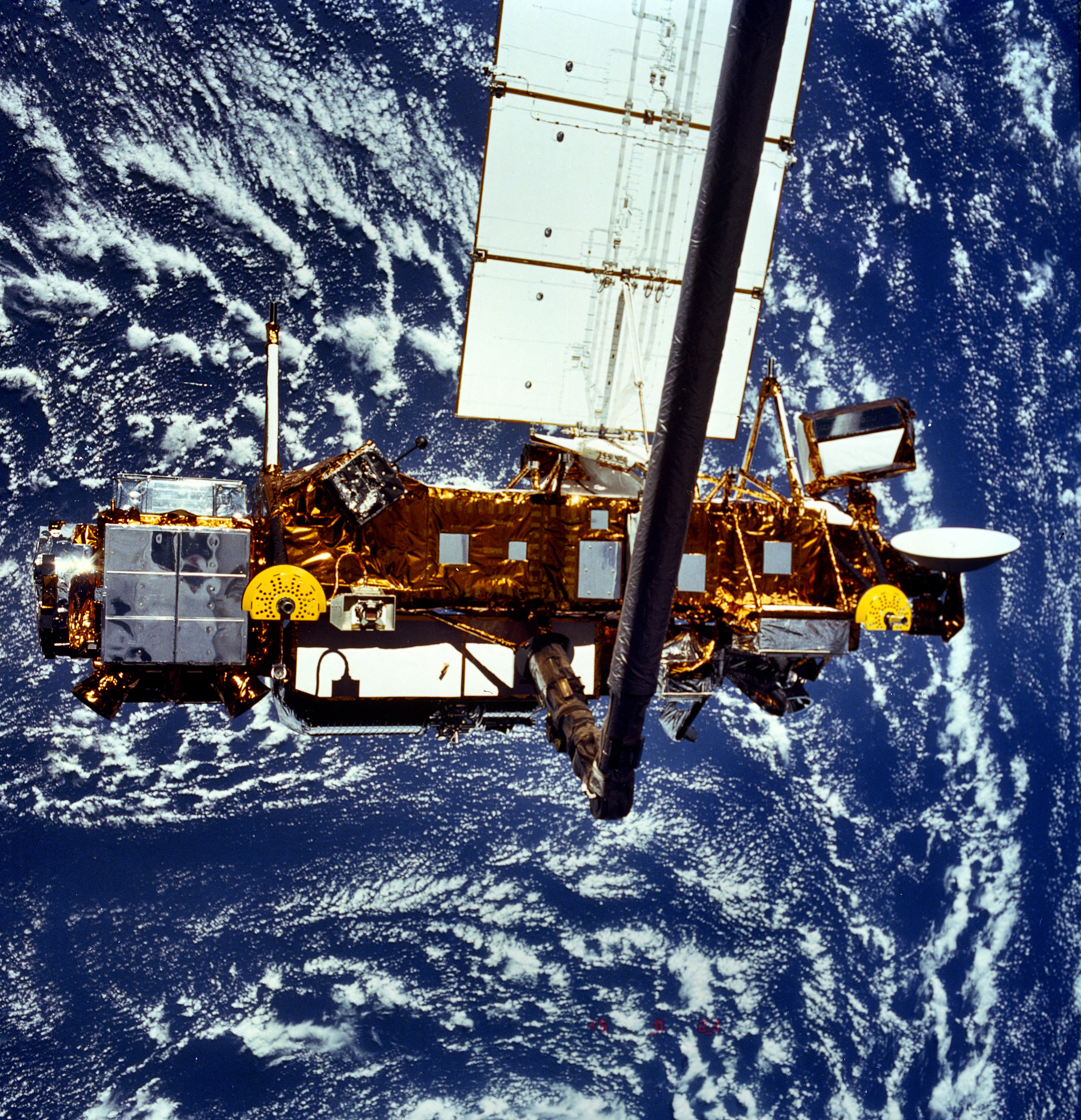
York University was involved with NASA's Upper Atmosphere Research Satellite

The Art Gallery of York University houses the permanent art collections. The collection of 1500 objects includes Canadian, American, Inuit, and European mixed media, multimedia, installations, painting, photography, prints, drawings, sculpture, sketchbooks, film and video.

The School of the Arts, Media, Performance and Design (AMPD, formerly the Faculty of Fine Arts), offers programmes such as design, ethnomusicology, cultural studies, visual arts, music, dance, and theatre. York's Jazz Department was once overseen by Oscar Peterson. York also has a joint Bachelor of Design program with Sheridan College. York's Departments of Film, Theatre and Creative Writing (which is not affiliated with the Faculty of Fine Arts) offers programmes in film production/directing, acting, and writing respectively, producing many award-winning graduates.

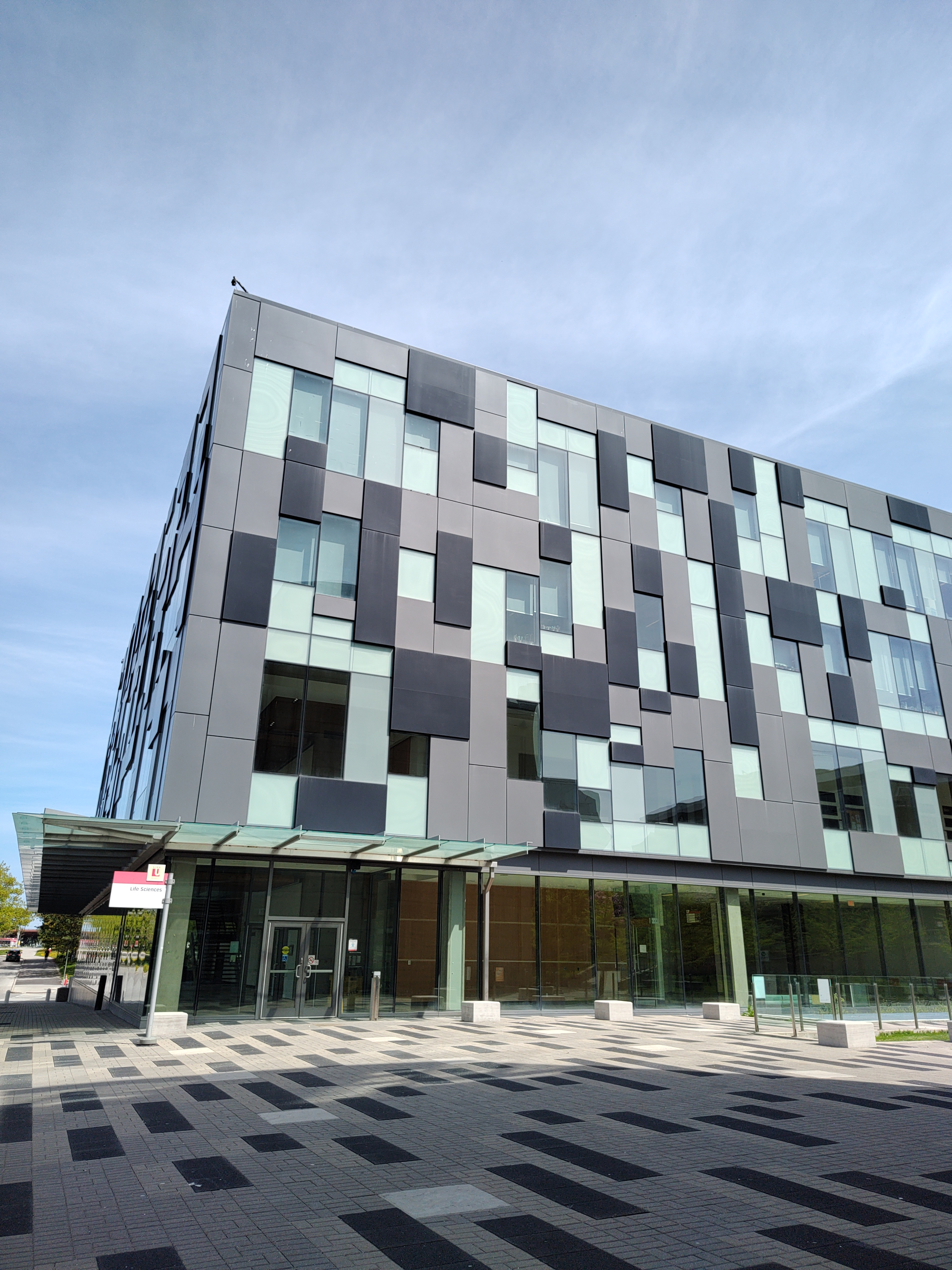
Life Sciences Building

=== Libraries ===
The York University library has a number of branches. The Scott Library has materials in humanities, social sciences, fine arts, and environmental studies. The business library is the Peter F. Bronfman Business Library.

=== Partnerships ===
==== Seneca College ====
The Keele campus is host to a satellite facility of Seneca College, which is branded as Seneca@York. The university has an articulation agreement with Seneca College, enabling graduates of select Seneca programs to be considered for transfer credits at York. Additionally, the two institutions offer a joint program in rehabilitation services, where graduates receive a BA or BSc degree from York and a certificate from Seneca College.

==== Study abroad programs ====
The university also offers the opportunity for students to earn credits towards their degree while studying abroad through international internships, the "Discover India" program operated between York and FLAME University, and student exchange programs. The university has student exchange agreements with over 120 institutions in 40 countries.

Toronto Raptors

As of 4 October 2024, York University officially announced a partnership with the Toronto Raptors. This partnership aims to provide students with the opportunities and career development resources in sports, entertainment, and media.

== Student life ==
=== Colleges and residences ===
York has nine undergraduate residential colleges:

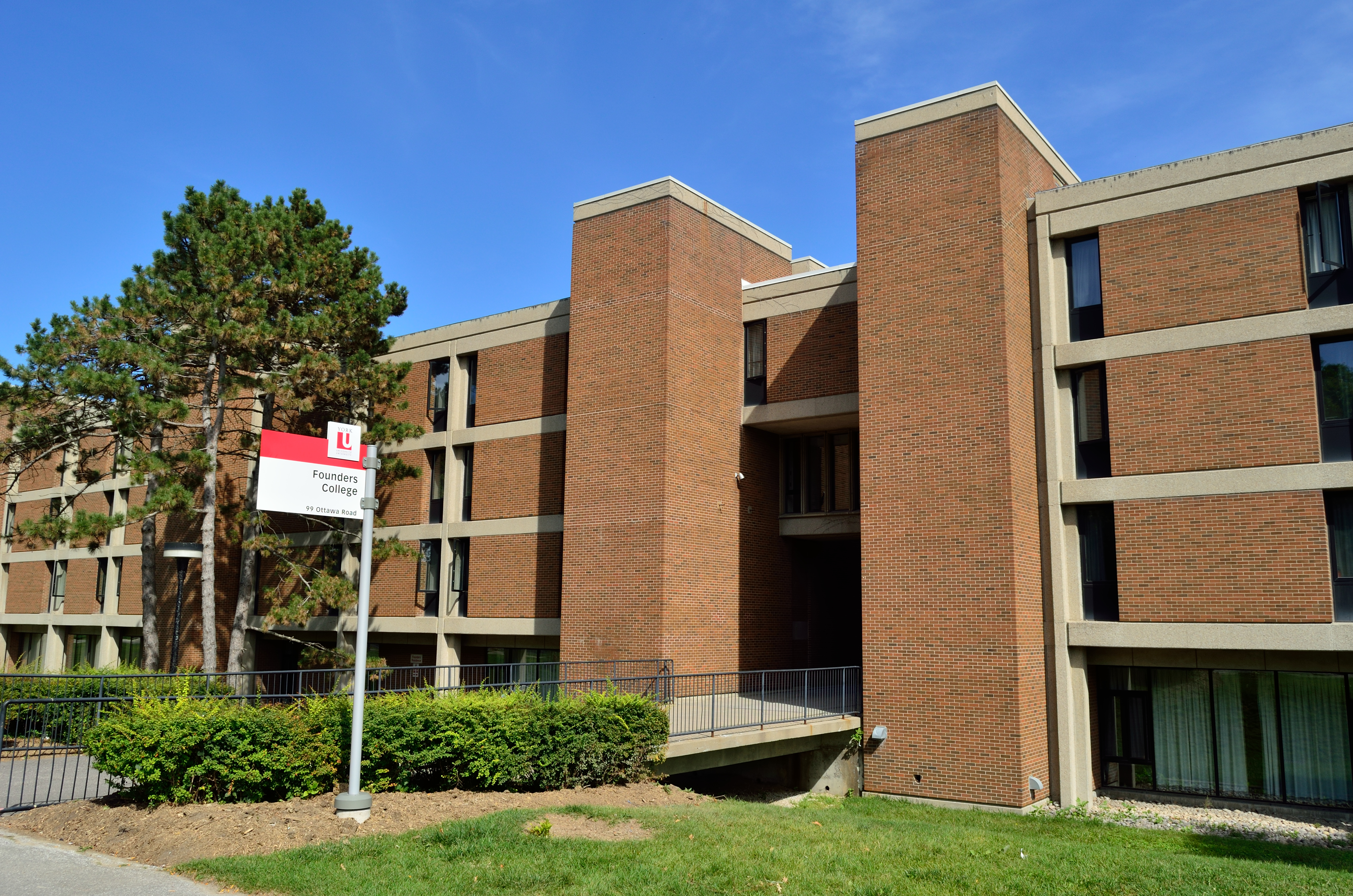
Founders Residence

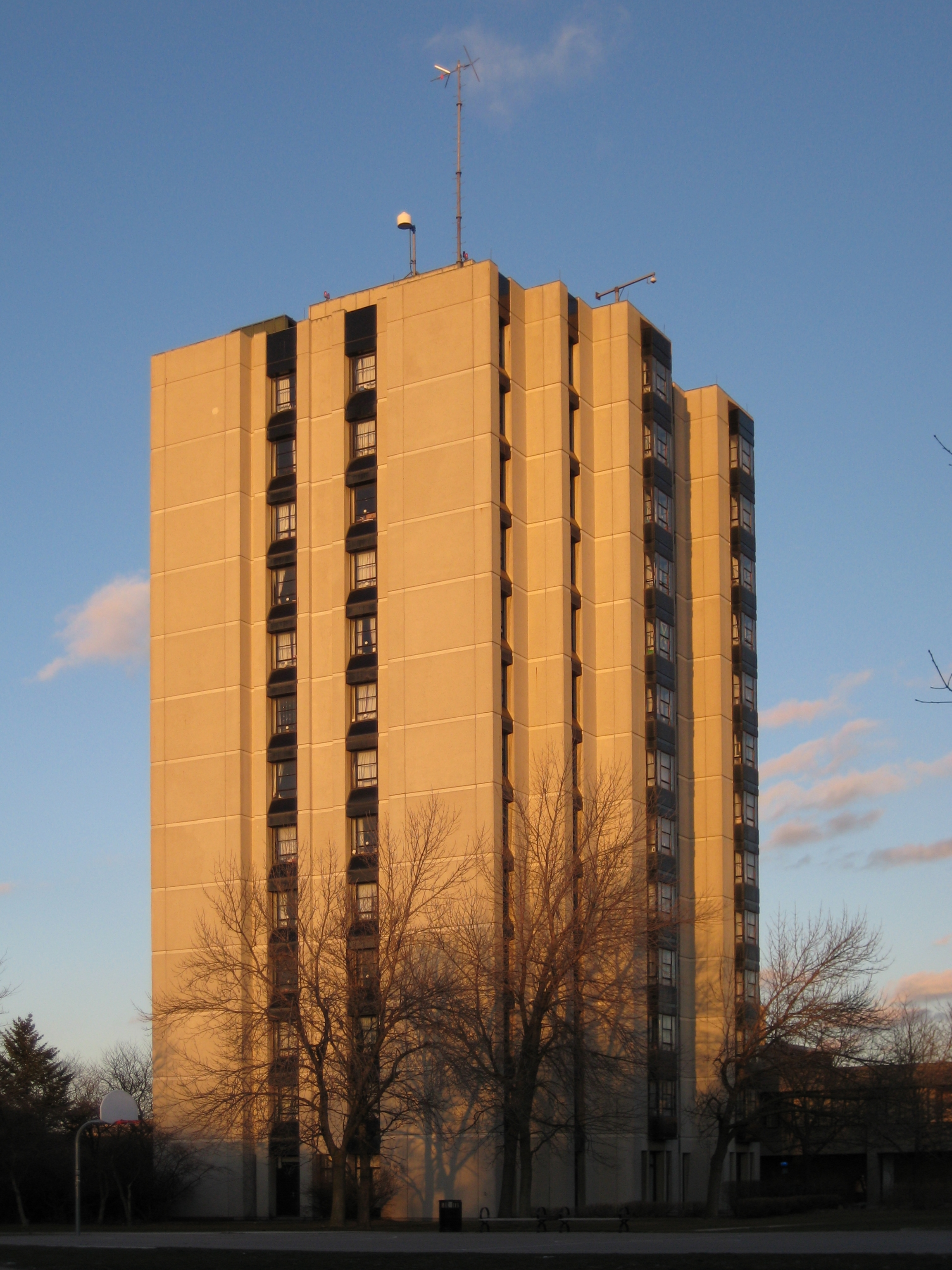
Vanier Residence

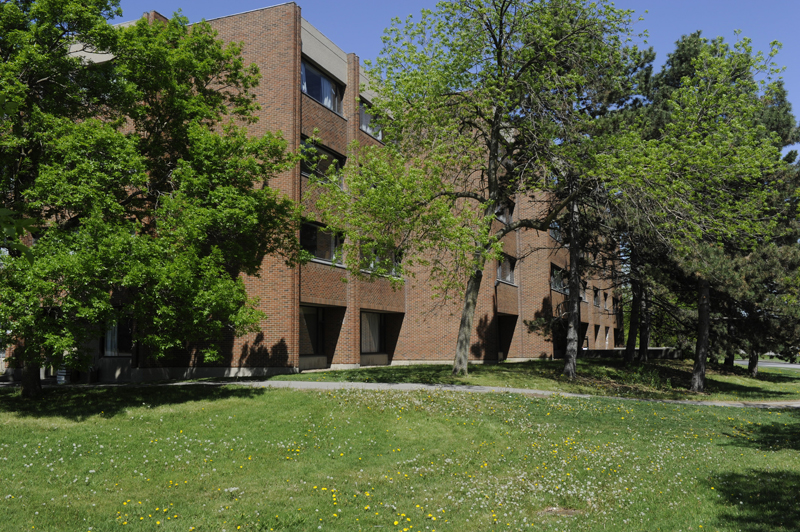
Winters Residence

Colleges of York University
Name (Founded)	Motto/Mandate	Academic Affiliations	Namesake
Calumet (1970)	"Technology and the Arts"	Business Administration, Economics, Business and Society, Cognitive Science, Communication Studies, Psychology	Norman-French for pipe or pipestem.
Founders (1965)	"Self, Culture & Society"	Anthropology, English, Environmental Studies, French, Geography, Italian, History, African studies, East Asian studies, Social Work, Latin American and Caribbean Studies, South Asian Studies, International Development, Urban studies	The Group of Seven, often referred to as "The Founders of Canadian Art"
Glendon (1966)	Bilingual Liberal Arts	Liberal Arts, English, French, Public Policy, International Affairs	A combination of "glen" meaning "valley" and "Don" for the Don River.
McLaughlin (1968)	Public Policy & Social Sciences	Political Science, Sociology, Law and Society, Criminology, Public Policy, Health and Society, Labour Studies	Colonel Samuel McLaughlin, businessman and philanthropist.
New College (2009)	Professional Studies	Commerce, Human Resources, Information Technology	Newest college at York University.
Norman Bethune (1972)	"Science and its Place in the World"	Natural Sciences, Engineering, Mathematics, Physics, Chemistry, Biology, Science and Technology Studies (formerly Science and Society)	Norman Bethune, Canadian doctor and Chinese hero.
Stong (1969)	Language and Sport	Kinesiology, Health Science	The Stong family lived on the land now occupied by the Keele campus.
Vanier (1965)	Humanities	Children's Studies, Classical Studies & Classics, Culture and Expression, Hellenic Studies, Individualized Studies, Jewish Studies, Liberal Studies, Philosophy, Religious Studies, Social and Political Thought, all Undecided Majors in the Faculty of Liberal Arts and Professional Studies	Georges Vanier, Governor-General of Canada.
Winters (1967)	Fine Arts & Education Studies	Arts, Media, Performance & Design, Faculty of Education	Robert Winters, Canadian Cabinet Minister and York's first chairman.
Glendon College acts as both a faculty and a college of the university. New College was created in 2009 to accommodate the creation of the Faculty of Liberal Arts and Professional Studies.

==== Student unions and organizations ====
York University is home to over 350 student clubs. A number of larger student organizations are supported by student levy fees. These include the local chapters of the social justice group OPIRG, and Regenesis, an environmental organization on campus that runs farmers' markets at the Keele and Glendon campuses, a free store, a community bike centre and a borrowing centre.

==== The Village at York University ====
The Village at York University off-campus student housing area has become a popular area of accommodation for many upper-year and post-graduate students, and the area has had a large amount of attention particularly for large parties hosted by students, including the annual Battle of the Village kegger held in March. There have also been many reports of the level of noise pollution from late-night parties from students living in the area. Safety has also been a pressing issue.

=== Campus media ===
Excalibur has been the university's autonomous student newspaper since 1966. In 2008, the YU Free Press was formed as an alternative campus newspaper. Existere is magazine published by students of the university's professional writing program. The magazine was first published in 1978.

YorkU Magazine (est. 2003) is the official magazine of York University. It is published 3 times a year in both a print and digital format.

=== Athletics ===
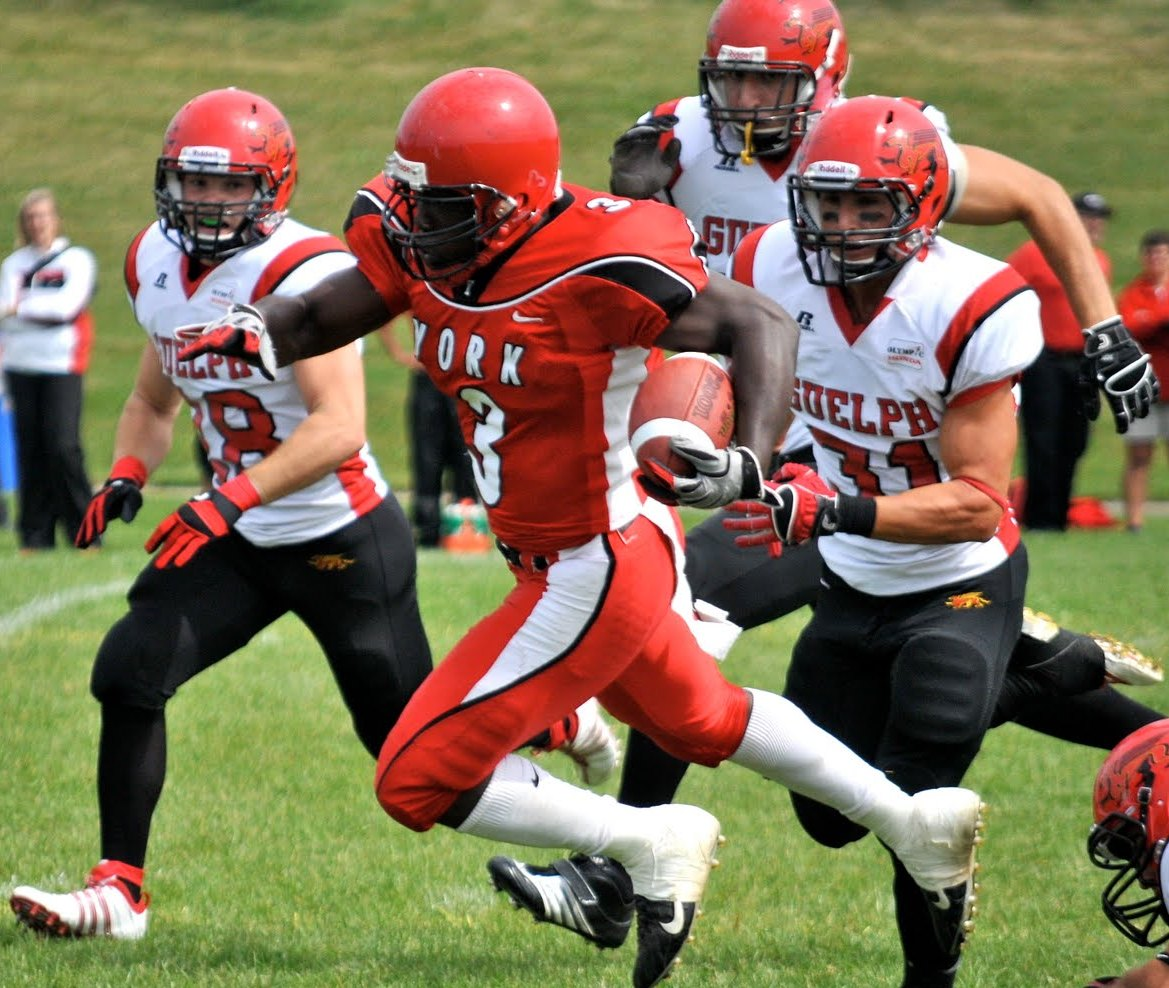
York University vs University of Guelph

The university is represented in U Sports by the York Lions. Beginning in 1968 York's sporting teams were known as the "Yeomen", after the Yeomen Warders, the guardians of the fortress and palace at the Tower of London, otherwise known as Beefeaters. Later, the name "Yeowomen" was introduced to encourage women to participate in sports. Popular sentiment ran against this name scheme, however, as many students were fond of noting that a "Yeowoman" was fictitious, neither a real word nor having any historical merit. In 2003, after conducting an extensive internal study, the university replaced both names with the "Lions", as part of a larger renaming effort, and a new logo, now a white and red lion, was brought into line with the university's new visual scheme. The name change also brought York University in line with the 92% of other Canadian universities which use a single name for both sexes' sports teams. Ironically, students often refer to the female Lions teams as the "York Lionesses", even though the name "Lion" is intended to apply to both sexes.

York offers 29 interuniversity sport teams, 12 sport clubs, 35 intramural sport leagues, special events and 10 pick-up sport activities offered daily.

York University has several athletic facilities, some of which are used for major tournaments. These include a football stadium, 4 gymnasia, 5 sport playing fields, 4 softball fields, 9 outdoor tennis courts, 5 squash courts, 3 dance/aerobic studios, 6 ice arenas, a swimming pool, an expanding fitness centre and Sobeys Stadium (home of the Canadian Open tennis tournament).

In 2014 the York Lions won four banners: the Canadian Interuniversity Sport (CIS) men's national track and field championship, the Ontario University Athletics women's provincial tennis championship and both the OUA and CIS men's soccer titles. York will be hosting the 2015 CIS Men's Soccer Championships at York Stadium November 2015. In 2015 and 2016 York Lions Women's Tennis team won the Canadian University National Championships. The volleyball team has been coached by, among others, Olympian Sam Schachter.

==== Fight song ====
Notable among a number of songs commonly played and sung at various events such as commencement and convocation, and athletic games are: "York Song", sung to the tune "Harvard".

=== Fraternities and sororities ===
Fraternities and sororities are not recognized by York University.

Phi Delta Phi (ΦΔΦ) international legal fraternity, at Osgoode Law School, was given special dispensation when the law school became part of the university in 1965, as the fraternity's history with the law school dated back to 1896, and is recognized at York.

== Antisemitism and Israel–Palestine controversies ==
York University has been the site of repeated antisemitic incidents and of recurring disputes over whether campus activism on the Israeli–Palestinian conflict has crossed into antisemitism. Jewish and pro-Israel organizations have criticized the university for decades over its handling of the conflict on campus, while student unions and some faculty members have accused the administration and outside groups of stifling political expression and academic freedom.

=== 2009–2022 ===
On 11 February 2009, a protest over student-government politics turned into a confrontation in which a crowd of about 100 people confined Jewish students in the Hillel lounge, shouting anti-Jewish and anti-Israel slurs; Toronto police escorted the students out. A university investigation found that the incident had left Jewish students "feeling intimidated, frightened, tense and nervous", and two students, one of them the incoming president of the York Federation of Students, were reprimanded and sanctioned under the student code of conduct. In March 2009, President Mamdouh Shoukri appointed a task force on student life, learning and community, chaired by Patrick Monahan. Its August report recommended measures to support open debate free of harassment, discrimination and intimidation, including a standing committee on campus dialogue and more consistent enforcement of the rules on the use of campus space.

In September 2016, the university dismissed lab technologist Nikolaos Balaskas after Hillel Ontario said that he had made antisemitic social media posts. In March 2017, police investigated after students found swastikas and an antisemitic statement on a chalkboard at the front of a classroom. Later that month, a building at Glendon College was evacuated after the latest in a series of bomb threats written on a washroom wall, which the college's principal described as antisemitic and anti-Black hate messages; it was the seventh such threat in two weeks.

On 20 November 2019, an event in Vari Hall hosted by the student group Herut Canada and featuring former Israeli soldiers from Reservists on Duty drew a large protest organized by Students Against Israeli Apartheid (SAIA), as well as counter-protesters, among them members of the Jewish Defense League. Protesters chanted slogans invoking the intifada, and fights broke out inside the building until police intervened. Toronto police reviewed the protest for possible hate crimes, and Ontario Premier Doug Ford and Toronto Mayor John Tory condemned it; SAIA said that its demonstration had been peaceful and that its chants were aimed at the Israeli military, not at the Jewish community. York commissioned an independent review by former Supreme Court of Canada justice Thomas Cromwell. His report, released in June 2020, found that SAIA members had tried to prevent people from attending the event and that Jewish Defense League members had pushed and shoved protesters. Cromwell recommended that York make clear that a protest ceases to be peaceful once it involves violence or blocks access to an event, strengthen its policies on racism, discrimination and harassment, particularly as they apply to student groups, and consider the IHRA definition of antisemitism. President Rhonda Lenton accepted all of the recommendations, and Herut Canada and SAIA were temporarily suspended from campus.

In June 2022, graffiti on a garage wall near the campus urged passersby to "shoot Jews in the head", alongside an antisemitic caricature. A suspect was later arrested and charged.

=== Since October 2023 ===
On 12 October 2023, five days after the Hamas-led attack on Israel, the York Federation of Students, the York University Graduate Students' Association and the Glendon College Student Union issued a joint statement of solidarity with Palestine that called the attack "a strong act of resistance" and referred to "so-called Israel". The university condemned the statement, which it said had been "widely interpreted as a justification for attacking civilians and a call to violence". On 20 October it began a formal process under its regulation on student organizations that could end in the withdrawal of the unions' recognition, unless they retracted the statement, publicly rejected antisemitism, acknowledged the harm caused and had their executives resign.

On 25 October 2023, the Toronto law firm Diamond and Diamond announced a proposed $15 million class action against York and the York Federation of Students on behalf of Jewish students and alumni, alleging that the university had negligently failed to address a pattern of antisemitic incidents and had breached its own non-discrimination policies. The statement of claim was issued in December 2023 and amended in 2025.

In January 2024, a document titled "A Toolkit for Teaching Palestine", attributed to CUPE Local 3903, which represents York's teaching assistants and contract faculty, urged members to divert their tutorials to the subject of Palestinian liberation. It named Hillel among the "Zionist cultural institutions" that it said made York complicit in Israel's occupation. Hillel York said that Jewish students feared mistreatment by their teaching assistants, and Lenton wrote that the senior administration did not consider the union's message to be in line with students' expectations. On 6 June 2024, Toronto police cleared a pro-Palestinian encampment a day after it was set up, enforcing a trespass notice served by the university; about 40 demonstrators left and one person was arrested. The protesters had demanded that York disclose and divest from investments in companies they said were profiting from Israel's offensive in Gaza.

In February 2025, the National Post reported that the president of the York Federation of Students had made dozens of social media posts appearing to support Hamas, its leaders and the 7 October attacks. On a student's complaint, a university adjudicator had reprimanded her the previous month.

In February 2026, the university said that it had received one formal complaint of antisemitism between May 2024 and April 2025 and did not have "any indication" of an increase in antisemitic incidents, while Jewish students interviewed by The Hub described a rise. York is the only Canadian university taking part in Hillel International's Campus Climate Initiative. In September 2026, B'nai Brith Canada's pilot Campus Climate Report Card, covering York, McGill, Queen's and the University of Toronto, gave the administrations of York, McGill and Toronto failing or critical marks for their handling of harassment, event disruptions and transparency in reporting antisemitic incidents.

== Notable people ==
York has over 370,000 living alumni. Although a large number of alumni live in Ontario, a significant number live in British Columbia, Nova Scotia, Alberta, New York, and Washington, D.C. York also has over 25,000 alumni overseas.

=== Distinguished research professors and university professors ===
The ranks of "distinguished research professor" and "university professor" are the highest rank a professor can achieve at York University. There are only ever up to a maximum of 25 each of active distinguished research professors and active university professors at any time. It is awarded to members of the faculty who have made outstanding contributions to the university through their work in research.

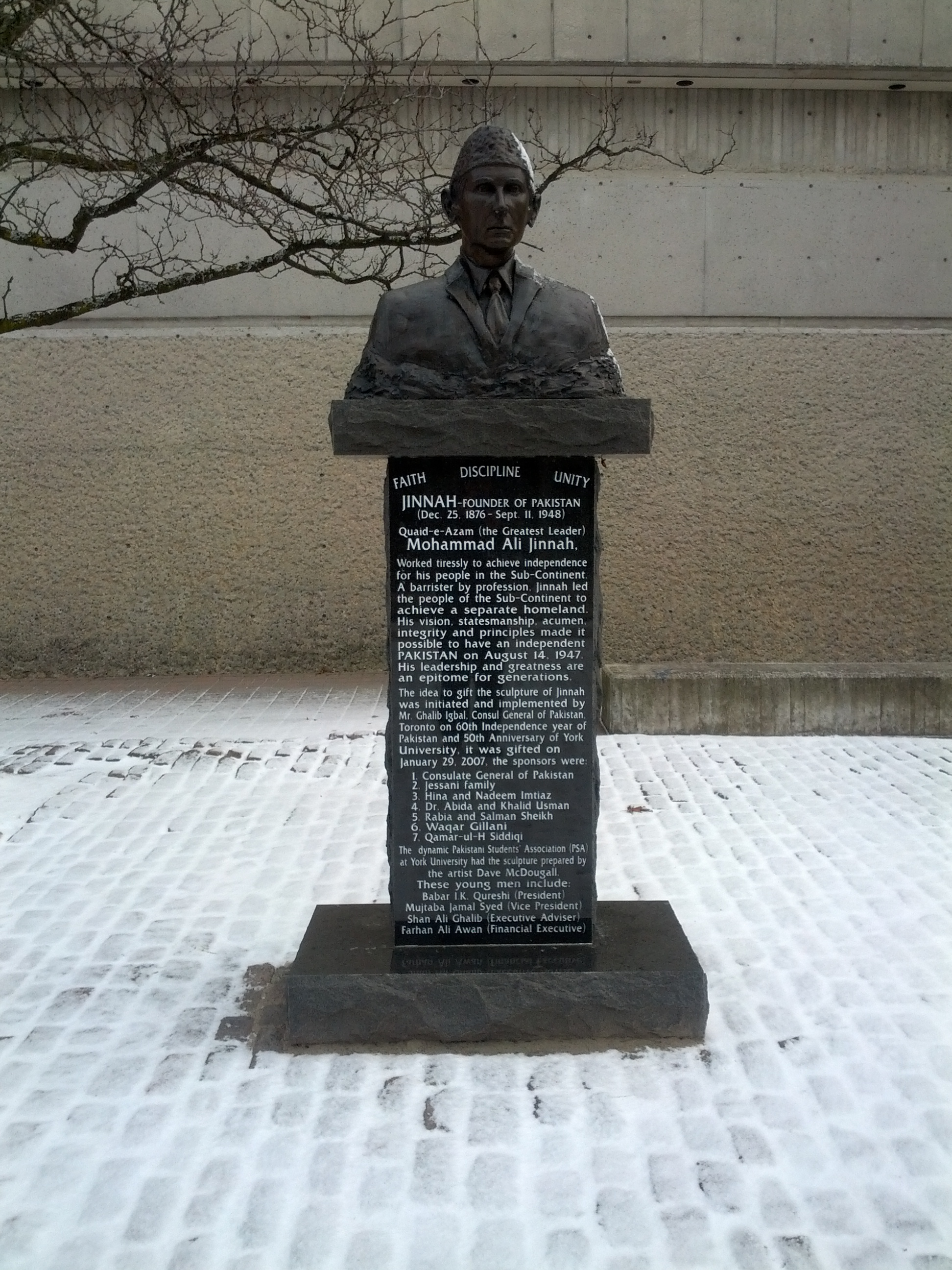
Statue of Muhammad Ali Jinnah at the University

- Pat Armstrong, 2010: Sociology, Liberal Arts & Professional Studies
- Isabella C. Bakker, 2014: Political Science, Liberal Arts & Professional Studies
- Norbert Bartel, 2006: Physics & Astronomy, Science
- Dawn Bazely, 2017: Biology, Science
- Ellen Bialystok, 2003: Psychology, Liberal Arts & Professional Studies
- Deborah Britzman, 2006: Education
- James Carley, 2000: English, Liberal Arts & Professional Studies
- Jean-Gabriel Castel, 1986: Osgoode Hall Law School
- Jerome Ch'en, 1984: History, Liberal Arts & Professional Studies
- Lorraine Code, 1998: Philosophy, Liberal Arts & Professional Studies
- J. Douglas Crawford, 2013: Psychology, Health
- Kenneth Davey, 1984: Biology, Science
- Beverley Diamond, Music
- Jonathan Edmondson, 2017: History, Liberal Arts and Professional Studies
- Sheila Embleton, 2009: Languages, Literatures & Linguistics, Liberal Arts & Professional Studies
- Stephen Gill, 2006: Political Science, Liberal Arts & Professional Studies
- Jack Granatstein, 1994: History, Liberal Arts & Professional Studies
- Leslie S. Greenberg, 2010: Psychology, Health
- Philip Gulliver, 1985: Anthropology, Liberal Arts & Professional Studies
- Henry Silton Harris, 1984: Philosophy, Glendon
- Robert Haynes, 1986: Biology, Science
- Michael Herren, 1999: Humanities, Liberal Arts & Professional Studies
- Eric Hessels, 2006: Physics & Astronomy, Science
- Richard Hornsey Archived 19 October 2017 at the Wayback Machine, 2015: Electrical Engineering, Lassonde School of Engineering
- Ian Howard, 1988: Psychology, Liberal Arts & Professional Studies
- Allan Hutchinson, 2006: Osgoode Hall Law School
- Christopher Innes, 1997: English, Liberal Arts & Professional Studies
- Ian Jarvie, 1993: Philosophy, Liberal Arts & Professional Studies
- Michael Kater, 1992: History, Liberal Arts & Professional Studies
- Gabriel Kolko, 1986: History, Liberal Arts & Professional Studies
- A. B. P. Lever, 1998: Chemistry, Science
- Clifford Leznoff, 2003: Chemistry, Science
- Paul Lovejoy, 1997: History, Liberal Arts & Professional Studies
- John C. McConnell, 2005: Earth & Space Science & Engineering, Science & Engineering
- Gareth Morgan, 1992: Commerce, Liberal Arts & Professional Studies
- H. V. Nelles, 2001: History, Liberal Arts & Professional Studies
- Hiroshi Ono, 2001: Psychology, Arts
- Leo Panitch, 1999: Political Science, Liberal Arts & Professional Studies
- Debra Pepler, 2008: Psychology, Health
- Huw O. Pritchard, 1983: Chemistry, Science
- David M. Regan, 1992: Psychology, Liberal Arts & Professional Studies
- Marcia H. Rioux, 2013: Health Policy & Management, Health
- R. Shayna Rosenbaum, 2025: Psychology, Health
- Beryl Rowland, 1983: English, Liberal Arts & Professional Studies
- Stuart Shanker, 2005: Psychology, Liberal Arts & Professional Studies
- Gordon Shepherd, 1993: Earth & Space Science, Science
- K. W. Michael Siu, 2008: Chemistry, Science
- Brian Slattery, 2008: Osgoode Hall Law School
- Martin Steinbach, 2000: Psychology, Liberal Arts & Professional Studies
- Bridget Stutchbury, 2009: Biology, Science
- James Tenney, 1995: Music, Fine Arts
- John Tsotsos, 2008: Computer Science & Engineering, Science & Engineering
- Leah Vosko, 2003: Political Science, Liberal Arts & Professional Studies
- Jianhong Wu, 2011: Mathematics & Statistics, Science

=== Chancellors ===
- Wilfred Curtis, former Chief of the Air Staff of the Royal Canadian Air Force (December 1959 - June 1968)
- Floyd Chalmers, publishing executive and philanthropist (July 1968 - September 1973)
- Walter L. Gordon, former federal finance minister (October 1973 - November 1977)
- John P. Robarts, former premier of Ontario (December 1977 - May 1982)
- John S. Proctor, former bank executive (May 1982 - September 1983)
- J. Tuzo Wilson, geophysicist (September 1983 - June 1986)
- Larry Clarke, founder of SPAR Aerospace (July 1986 - June 1991)
- Oscar Peterson, jazz pianist (September 1991 - February 1994)
- Arden Haynes, former CEO of Imperial Oil (February 1994 - April 1998)
- Avie Bennett, philanthropist (May 1998 - June 2004)
- Peter deCarteret Cory, former justice of the Supreme Court of Canada (June 2004 - May 2008)
- Roy McMurtry, former Chief Justice of Ontario (May 2008 - June 2014)
- Gregory Sorbara, former Ontario cabinet minister (June 2014 – May 2023)
- Kathleen Taylor, former chair of the Royal Bank of Canada (May 2023 – present)

=== Presidents ===
- Murray G. Ross, academic 1959–1970
- David Slater, economist and civil servant 1970–1973
- H. Ian Macdonald, economist and civil servant 1973–1984
- Harry W. Arthurs, lawyer and academic 1985–1992
- Susan Mann, historian and academic, 1993–1997
- Lorna Marsden, academic and politician 1997–2007
- Mamdouh Shoukri, academic, 2007–2017
- Rhonda Lenton, academic (sociologist), 2017–2025
- Lisa Philipps, academic, 2026-present

== Labour disruptions ==
York University has a history of faculty and teaching assistant strikes. In 1997, there was a faculty strike by YUFA that lasted seven weeks. At the time, this was the second longest strike in Canadian University history. Key issues in the strike included retirement, funding, and institutional governance.

In 2001, teaching assistants and contract faculty went on strike for 11 weeks, when the university broke its own record. The central issue in the 2001 disruption was the administration's proposed attempts to remove tuition indexation language.

=== 2008 CUPE 3903 strike ===
A strike beginning on 6 November 2008 concerned a variety of institutional grievances, including job security for contract professors, elimination of the Non-Academic Student Code of Conduct, creation of whistleblower protection, and fund indexation. On 20 January 2009, CUPE 3903 defeated a forced ratification vote that would have ended the strike. On 24 January, Ontario premier Dalton McGuinty announced a rare Sunday recall of the provincial legislature in order to pass back-to-work legislation mandating an immediate end to the strike. On 29 January, the York University Labour Disputes Resolution Act was passed in the provincial parliament on a count of 42–8 ending the long 85-day strike and setting a precedent for future university strikes in Ontario.

=== 2015 CUPE 3903 strike ===
An additional strike by teaching assistants, contract faculty, and graduate assistants took place throughout March 2015. When the strike began, on 2 March, the university cancelled nearly all classes because about two-thirds of York courses were taught by the striking contract faculty at the time. On 10 March, the contract faculty ratified a new agreement, but the teaching assistants and graduate assistants rejected tentative agreements the bargaining team had reached with the university. The teaching assistants and graduate assistants, continued their strike until the end of the month. Contract faculty did not go back to work in support of the union and classes remained cancelled. The union reached a tentative agreement with the university on 29 March 2015, which was ratified on 31 March 2015, thus putting an immediate end to the 29-day strike. Faiz Ahmed, then Chair of CUPE 3903, highlighted the gains in the new agreement: “This agreement represents a near-total win for our members and will make York a leader with respect to equity issues.” The agreement included improvements to wages and benefits, indexation of tuition, and a plan for the university to add LGBTQ people to their employment equity policies.

=== 2018 CUPE 3903 strike ===
Units 1, 2, and 3 of CUPE Local 3903, the union represented by teaching assistants, contract faculty, and graduate assistants, began striking on Monday, 5 March 2018; several months after their previous collective agreement expired on 31 August 2017. The union's aim was to, in their words, "secure a fair collective agreement that, among other things, protected quality education and creates a less precarious working environment in Ontario's university sector". The main issues of the strike revolved around job security and the path to permanent tenured employment for contract faculty. A forced ratification vote was held between 6–9 April and was rejected by an overwhelming majority by all three units. On 13 June, a ratification vote was held for Unit 2 members, where the union executives recommended voting against the university's offer. The results of the vote were thrown out due to the fact that there were more ballots cast than signatures of eligible voters. A re-vote was held on 14 and 15 June, where Unit 2 ratified the university's offer, with 239 members voting in favour, and 122 opposed. Units 1 and 3 remained on strike until 25 July, when the newly formed 42nd Parliament of Ontario led by Premier Doug Ford passed back-to-work legislation via the Urgent Priorities Act, ending the strike after 143 days, making it the longest strike in the post-secondary sector in Canadian history.

=== 2024 CUPE 3903 strike ===
After avoiding a strike in 2021, Units 1, 2, and 3 of CUPE 3903 went on strike beginning Monday, 26 February 2024. As in previous years, the union was focused on job stability for contract faculty and wage increases for all three units.

The wage issue was twofold. In the renewal collective bargaining agreement, covering 2023 through 2026, the union hoped to win wage increases matching record inflation. In addition, the provincial government passed Bill 124 in 2019, which limited public sector raises to 1% annually. The Court of Appeal for Ontario ruled that Bill 124 violated the right of unions under the Canadian Charter of Rights and Freedoms to collectively bargain, upholding a lower court's ruling. Rather than further appeal the decision to the Supreme Court, the Ford government instead decided to repeal the law in its entirety, allowing CUPE 3903 and other public sector unions in Ontario to negotiate for retroactive wage increases for the three years that Bill 124 was in effect.

On 14 April, CUPE 3903 and York University announced that they had reached a tentative agreement. The agreement was ratified by CUPE 3903's membership on 19 April, ending the strike after 53 days with the union's members returning to work on Monday, 22 April 2024.

== See also ==
- Allan I. Carswell Astronomical Observatory
- Canadian university scientific research organizations
- Education in Toronto
- Higher education in Ontario
- Las Nubes Rainforest Preserve
- List of universities in Ontario

== Bibliography ==
=== Histories ===
- Axelrod, Paul (1982). Scholars and Dollars: Politics, Economics, and the Universities of Ontario 1945–1980. University of Toronto Press.
- Horn, Michiel (2009). York University: The Way Must Be Tried. McGill-Queen's University Press. ISBN 978-0-7735-3416-2.
- McKillop, Brian (1951). Matters of the Mind: The University in Ontario, 1791–1951. University of Ottawa Press.
- Ross, Murray (1992). The Way Must Be Tried: Memoirs of a University Man. Stoddart.
- Ross, Murray (1970). Those Ten Years, 1960–1970: The President's Report on the First Decade of York University. York University.
- Saywell, John T. (2008). Someone to Teach Them: York and the Great University Explosion, 1960–1973. University of Toronto Press. ISBN 978-0-8020-9827-6.
- UPACE (1963) Master Plan for the York University Campus.
- York University (1998). York Campus Master Plan.
