= Las Nubes Rainforest Preserve =

Conservation reserve located in San José Province, Costa Rica

- Reserva Biológica Las Nubes
- Location within Costa Rica
- Location: San José Province, Costa Rica
- Nearest city: San Isidro de El General
- Coordinates: 9°23′8″N 83°36′18.9″W
- Area: 145 ha (360 acres)
- Established: 1998
- Owner: York University
- Website: http://lasnubes.info.yorku.ca/

The Las Nubes Rainforest Preserve (Spanish: Reserva Biológica Las Nubes) is a 145 hectare (360 acre) conservation reserve that is located an hour outside the city of San Isidro de El General, in San José Province, Costa Rica.

The property was donated to York University by Dr. Woody Fisher in 1998. The Faculty of Environmental Studies operates an eco-campus on the property that hosts classes and research projects.
