= Rhonda Lenton =

Canadian academic

Rhonda L. Lenton
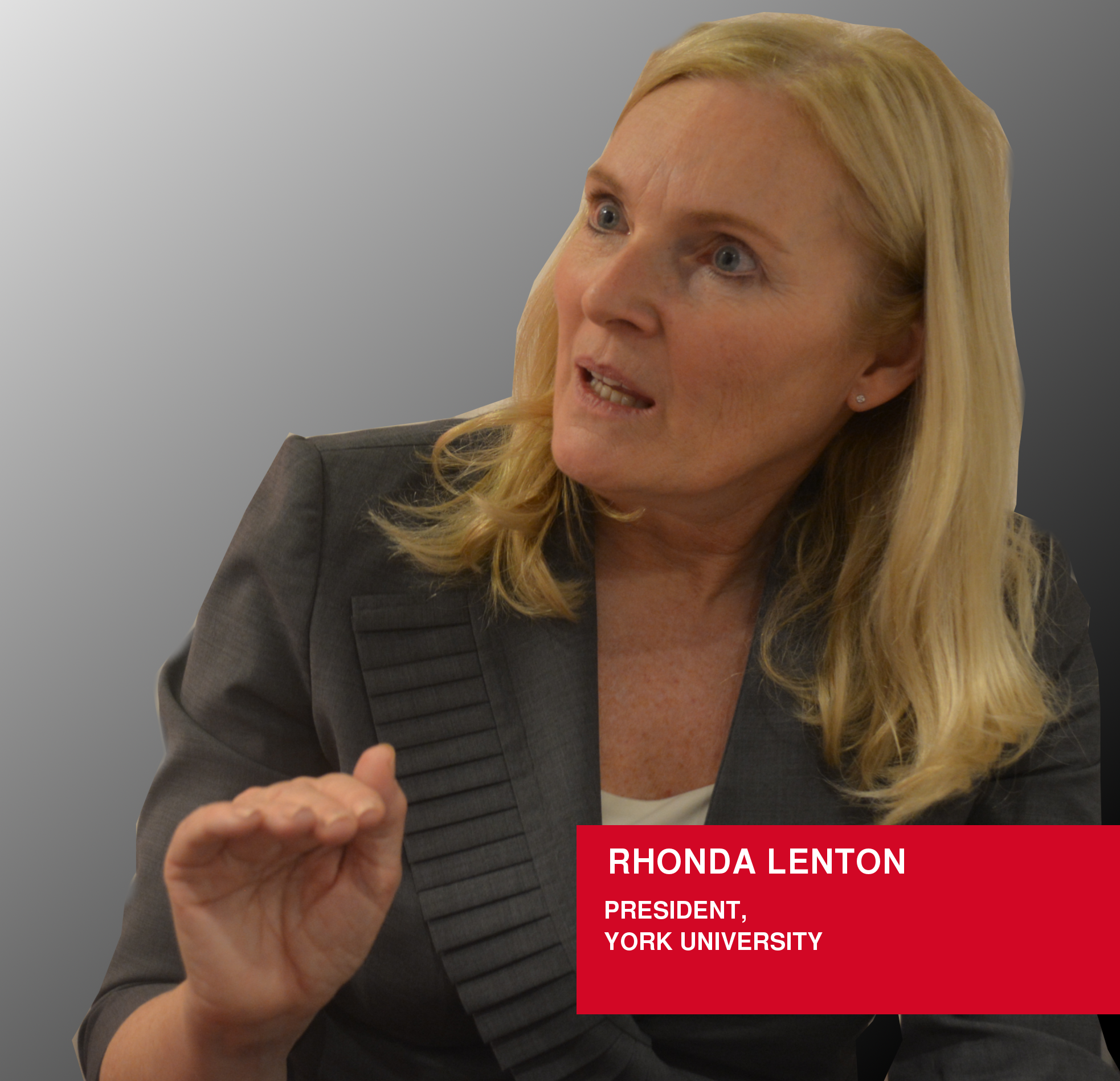
- Lenton in a screengrab of a promotional video by York University in 2018

8th President of York University
- In office July 1, 2017 – December 31, 2025
- Chancellor: Kathleen Taylor
- Preceded by: Mamdouh Shoukri
- Succeeded by: Lisa Philipps (interim)

Personal details
- Born: August 10, 1956 (age 70) Stratford, Ontario, Canada
- Education: University of Winnipeg (BA with honours); University of Manitoba (MA); University of Toronto (PhD)
- Occupation: Professor

Academic background
- Thesis: Parental Discipline and Child Abuse (1989)
- Doctoral advisor: M. Eichler

Academic work
- Discipline: sociology
- Institutions: McMaster University; Atkinson College; York University

Rhonda L. Lenton is a Canadian academic administrator and professor of sociology. During her research career, Lenton led randomized public telephone surveys of social issues such as Internet dating, sexual assaults, and continues to examine Judaism in Canada. She then served as Dean of Atkinson College and later as Vice President Academic and Provost of York University in Toronto, Canada. From July 1, 2017 to December 31, 2025, she was the 8th president and vice-chancellor, succeeding Mamdouh Shoukri.

== Career ==
=== Research ===
Lenton completed her Ph.D. in sociology at the University of Toronto in 1989. The title of her dissertation was Parental Discipline and Child Abuse. Before becoming an academic administrator, she published research on a range of topics related to antisemitism, family violence, feminism in academia, and online dating. Her work included a 1999 national telephone survey of randomly selected women, asking them about their experiences with sexual harassment and assault. She has also researched the impact that the inclusion of women's studies within academia has had on feminism, determining that it had made feminism more conservative. She also conducted randomized robocalls regarding Internet dating behaviours of the Canadian public in 2001. In 2018, Lenton collaborated on a landmark study with her husband Robert Brym and Environics, titled 2018 Survey of Jews in Canada. The report was based on phone surveys of up to eighty questions and presents a "portrait of the identity, practices, and experiences of Jews in Canada". As university Provost, Lenton supported male students in their requests to keep them away from female students due to their religious preferences.

=== York University president ===
Lenton's appointment as university president became effective on July 1, 2017. During a divisive part-time faculty strike in 2015, she was the university's chief spokesperson and on the university's negotiating committee; Lenton's anticipated presidential appointment generated widespread opposition from an alliance of university students and faculty members before its announcement.

In 2018, during her first year, another strike occurred at the university under her leadership. Undergraduate students occupied the University Senate in support of the strike for several months. During the sit-in, the participants highlighted potential expense account spending issues from Lenton's term as Vice President Academic and Provost, in addition to various other tuition-oriented concerns.

On May 1, 2018, an official letter by the Canadian Association of University Teachers (CAUT) admonished both Lenton and Richard E. Waugh, the chair of the Board of Governors (BoG), for their concerted and repeated attempts to undermine academic self-governance at York University. At that time, several York University faculty councils and student associations also carried non-confidence motions in the conduct and leadership of Lenton as president. On May 11, the union representing the full-time tenured faculty stated the strike had lasted more than two months due to Lenton and the board's desire to break the union.

On June 6, 2024, the York University administration, under Lenton's leadership, called dozens of police forces to dismantle an encampment that protestors had set up the day before to demand the university to disclose its investments and divest from and cut ties with Israel; CBC News noted on that day that another encampment at the University of Toronto remained. Among the protesters were students and Indigenous elders according to a statement from the protestors. Three weeks later on June 30, she was appointed the Chair of Council of Ontario Universities.

In June 2025 Lenton announced she would resign from the position at the end of the year, eighteen months before her term was to end. Lisa Philipps succeeded her as interim president on January 1, 2026.

== Recognition ==
In 2015, the Women's Executive Network named her one of the 100 Most Powerful Women in Canada during her past role as Provost of York University.

== Personal life ==
Lenton married Robert Byrm, a professor of sociology at the University of Toronto, in 1987 and converted to Judaism. They have three daughters.
