= Lisa Philipps =

President of York University (2026-present)

Lisa Philipps is the interim president and vice-chancellor of York University. Previously, Phillips served as the provost and vice-president academic of York University.

Phillips studied law at the University of Toronto, where she got her LLB, and subsequently at York University, where she received her LLM. She was called to the bar in Ontario in 1988. She practiced with Blake, Cassels & Graydon before entering academia.

Phillips became a professor at Osgoode Hall Law School in 1996. Her research included criticism of governments that pursue balanced budgets. In 2015 she served for a year as interim dean of the Bora Laskin Faculty of Law at Lakehead University.

In 2017 Phillips was appointed as interim provost for one year. During that year she played a public role in the 2018 York University strike of contract faculty. In 2018 she was appointed to a five-year term.

== Selected publications ==
- Phillips, Lisa (2016), "Registered Savings Plans and the Making of Middle-Class Canada: Toward a Performative Theory of Tax Policy" (PDF), Fordham Law Review, 84 (6): 2677–2698
- Phillips, Lisa (2013), "Real Versus Notional Income Splitting - What Canada Should Learn from the US "Innocent Spouse" Problem", Canadian Tax Journal, 61 (3): 709–721
