= Robert Brym =

Canadian sociologist

- Born: Saint John, New Brunswick, Canada
- Spouse: Rhonda Lenton

Academic background
- Education: BA, MA, Dalhousie University; PhD, 1976, University of Toronto
- Thesis: Strangers and rebels: the Russian-Jewish intelligentsia in Marxist social movements at the turn of the twentieth century (1976)

Academic work
- Institutions: University of Toronto

Robert J. Brym FRSC is a Canadian sociologist. He is a professor emeritus at the University of Toronto's Department of Sociology.

== Education and career ==
Brym earned his Bachelor of Arts and Master of Arts at Dalhousie University before completing his PhD at the University of Toronto.

As a professor at the University of Toronto, Brym researched political sociology in Canada, Russia, and the Israel/Palestine conflict. He received the 2007 Northrop Frye Award and was elected a Fellow of the Royal Society of Canada in 2008. Brym served as editor-in-chief of the Canadian Review of Sociology and Anthropology from 1986 to 1989 and as editor-in-chief of Current Sociology from 1992 to 1997. From 2001 to 2005, Brym served as the editor-in-chief of the Journal of East European Jewish Affairs.

In 2018, Brym, Keith Neuman, and Rhonda Lenton conducted the first nationally representative survey of Jews in Canada, modelled after the 2013 Pew Survey of American Jews. Following the October 7 attacks, Brym published Jews and Israel 2024: A Survey of Canadian Attitudes and Jewish Perceptions. Through this survey, he found that while two-thirds of Canadian Jews felt unsafe and victimized, most non-Jewish Canadians had positive feelings towards them. He attributed the growth in antisemitism in Canada to four specific groups and described his study as a wake-up call for Canadian Jewish leaders that they're tackling the problem of antisemitism the wrong way. The following year, Brym led a research study funded by the Government of Canada to report on antisemitism in Ontario's Kindergarten-to-Grade 12 schools. His research team found that antisemitism in schools is systemic, widespread, and often ignored or enabled by educators and administrators. He also sat on the advisory board for Canada's study on Campus Antisemitism and Student Experience.

== Personal life ==
Brym was born and raised in Saint John, New Brunswick, Canada, to a religious mother and atheist socialist father. His father had grown up in Poland but escaped before the Nazi occupation and his mother was from Lithuania. Due to his parents' background, he grew up speaking Yiddish, but stopped speaking the language in public when he was 10.

Brym is married to fellow sociologist Rhonda Lenton.

== Published books ==
- The Jewish Intelligentsia and Russian Marxism: A Sociological Study of Intellectual Radicalism and Ideological Divergence (London: Macmillan, 1978)
- Soviet-Jewish Emigration and Soviet Nationality Policy, with Victor Zaslavsky (London: Macmillan, 1983)
- The Jews of Moscow, Kiev and Minsk: Identity, Antisemitism, Emigration, with Rozalina Ryvkina (New York: New York University Press, 1993).
