= List of York University people =

This is a list of York University people. It includes notable graduates and faculty of the Toronto, Ontario, Canada institution, as well as graduates of Osgoode Hall Law School prior to its affiliation with York in 1969. See also Notable alumni of Osgoode Hall.

== Graduates ==
=== Politicians ===
Name	Notability
Gail Teixeira	Minister of Parliamentary Affairs and Governance in Guyana
John Black Aird	Lieutenant Governor of Ontario (1980–1985) and Canadian senator (1964–1974)
Lincoln Alexander	Lieutenant Governor of Ontario (1985–1991)
Andrus Ansip	Prime Minister of Estonia (2005–)
Navdeep Bains	Liberal MP for Mississauga—Malton, and Minister of Innovation, Science and Economic Development
Maurizio Bevilacqua	Parliamentary Secretary (1993–1996) and Secretary of State for Canada (2002–2003)
Angela Bogdan	Consul General of Canada in Sydney, Australia; previously posted as Ambassador to Serbia and High Commissioner to Sri Lanka
Marion Boyd	Attorney General of Ontario (1993–1995)
Michael Bryant	Attorney-General of Ontario (2003–2007)
Aileen Carroll	federal Minister for International Cooperation (2003–2006)
Ann Cavoukian	Ontario Privacy Commissioner
Carme Chacon	Minister of Defence in the Government of Spain (2008–)
Joseph Clarke	mayor of Edmonton, Alberta (1934–1937)
Marshall A. Cohen	former president and CEO of Molson, member of the Trilateral Commission
David Collenette	former senior federal cabinet minister
Scot Davidson	Member of Parliament
George Drew	14th Premier of Ontario
Ernie Eves	23rd Premier of Ontario
J. S. Ewart QC	advocate of Canadian independence
Gordon Fairweather	first chief commissioner of the Canadian Human Rights Commission
Martha Hall Findlay	Member of Parliament and active member of the Liberal Party of Canada
Jim Flaherty	Minister of Finance of Canada
Herb Gray	former Deputy Prime Minister of Canada, former Solicitor General of Canada
Barbara Hall	former Mayor of Toronto, current Chief Commissioner of the Ontario Human Rights Commission
Carol Hansell	Board of Directors, Bank of Canada
Charles Harnick	former Attorney General of Ontario
Edmund Ho Hau Wah	1st Chief Executive of the Macau SAR
Dennis Horak	Ambassador of Canada to Saudi Arabia
Ron Irwin	former Federal Cabinet Minister, former Ambassador to Ireland, and former Consul General to Boston
James Kelleher	former member of the Senate of Canada
Michael Kerzner	Solicitor General of Ontario
Peter Kormos	former Minister of Consumer and Commercial Relations, House Leader for the Ontario NDP Caucus
Zahir Lalani	Consul and Senior Representative for New York at the Bank of Canada
Floyd Laughren	former Ontario NDP MPP and finance minister
Jack Layton	Leader of the federal New Democratic Party
William Ross Macdonald	former Lieutenant Governor of Ontario
John Matheson	former MP, retired judge, and political sponsor of the Canadian Flag, which was designed by George Stanley
Roy McMurtry	former Attorney General of Ontario
John McNee	former Ambassador of Canada to United Nations
Rachel Notley	17th Premier of Alberta
Gordon O'Connor	Former Minister of National Defence of Canada
James O'Reilly	Federal politician
Lisa Raitt	Canadian Minister of Natural Resources
John Robarts	17th Premier of Ontario
Ian Scott	former Attorney General of Ontario
Ulric Shannon	Consul General of Canada in Istanbul, Turkey
Jagmeet Singh	Former Leader of the Federal New Democratic Party
Mohamud Siraji	Member of Parliament
Karen Kraft Sloan	former United Nations Ambassador of the environment
Greg Sorbara	Ontario Minister of Finance
John Tory	Mayor of Toronto, Leader of the Progressive Conservative Party of Ontario
Peter Van Loan	Leader of the Government in the House of Commons, former President of the Queen's Privy Council for Canada, Minister of Intergovernmental Affairs
Robert Stanley Welch	former deputy premier of Ontario, former attorney general of Ontario
Sara Wilshaw	former Consul General of Canada in Dallas, Texas, USA
David Young	former Attorney General of Ontario

=== Judges ===
Name	Notability
Archie Campbell	legal giant, led inquiry into SARS
Kim Carter	former Chief Military Judge of the Canadian Forces, current Ombudsmen of British Columbia
John Robert Cartwright	former Chief Justice of Canada
Peter Cory	former puisne judge of the Supreme Court of Canada and former Chancellor of the university
Asher Dan Grunis	former president of the Supreme Court of Israel
Frank Joseph Hughes	Supreme Court Judge
Wilfred Judson	former puisne judge of the Supreme Court of Canada
Patrick Kerwin	former Chief Justice of Canada
Harry S. Laforme	Ont. Court of Appeal, head of Aboriginal Truth and Reconciliation Commission of Canada
Bora Laskin	former Chief Justice of Canada
Patrick LeSage	former Chief Justice of Ontario
Claire L'Heureux-Dube	former judge of the Supreme Court of Canada (LLD)
Allen Linden	Federal Court of Appeal judge
Goldwyn Arthur Martin	QC, former Justice of the Court of Appeal for Ontario, prominent criminal law scholar
Roy McMurtry	former Chief Justice of Ontario
Dennis O'Connor	of the Court of Appeal for Ontario and Associate Chief Justice of Ontario
James O'Reilly	Federal Court of Canada
John D. Richard	Chief Justice of the Federal Court of Appeal of Canada
Wishart Spence	former puisne judge of the Supreme Court of Canada
Warren Winkler	Chief Justice of Ontario

=== Business leaders ===
Name	Notability
Wajid Ali	Senior Vice President and CFO at Synaptics
Isabel Bassett	former MPP and chief executive officer of TVOntario
Sir Edward Wentworth Beatty	President of the Canadian Pacific Railway
Douglas G. Bergeron	billionaire, president and CEO of Verifone
George Butterfield	co-founder of luxury active travel company Butterfield & Robinson
Jason Falovitch	co-founder of PlayLine and Leverage Game Media
Ivan Fecan	President and chief executive officer, CTV
Dennis Fotinos	President and CEO of Enwave
Robert J. Gemmell	former president and CEO of Citigroup Global Markets Canada Inc.
John S. Hunkin	former CEO of CIBC
Colleen Johnston	Group Head Finance and Chief Financial Officer at TD Bank Financial Group
Vikas Kohli	founder of Fatlabs Recording Studio in Mississauga, Ontario, Canada
Gordon Lownds	co-founder of Sleep Country Canada
Sergio Marchionne	President and CEO of Fiat and Chrysler Group LLC
Rob McEwen	President and CEO of US Gold Corporation
Alan G. McNally	former chairman of Harris Bank
Eileen Mercier	Chair of Ontario Teachers' Pension Plan Board
Larry Organ	Chief Executive Officer, ConsumerBase LLC, founder of FastWeb and JobsOnline
Denise Pickett	President and CEO of American Express Canada
Steve Prentice	founder of the Bristall Group
Edward Samuel Rogers	business tycoon, president and CEO Rogers Communications
Bojana Sentaler	fashion designer and founder, president and creative director of Sentaler
Alex Shnaider	Chairman of Royal Laser Corp. and co-founder of Midland Group Midland Group, Canada's youngest billionaire
Paul Tsaparis	President and CEO of Hewlett-Packard Canada
Richard E. Waugh	President and chief executive officer, Scotiabank
David Wilson	Chairman of the Ontario Securities Commission

=== Artists and entertainers ===
Name	Notability
Debra Anderson	writer
Jaime Angelopoulos	sculptor
Will Beauchamp	filmmaker, Warner Bros. Canada representative
Lisa Ann Beley	voice actress
Mark Bluvshtein	chess grandmaster
Christian Bök	poet, professor at University of Calgary
Arthur Bourinot	Governor General's Award for Poetry recipient
Elizabeth Bradley	Chair of Drama at the Tisch School of the Arts at New York University
Shannon Bramer	poet
Natalie Brown	star of Sophie on CBC
Amanda Brugel	co-star on MVP: The Secret Lives of Hockey Wives on CBC
Jane Buyers	multimedia artist
Lisa Charleyboy	Indigenous writer, social entrepreneur, editor-in-chief of Urban Native Magazine
Juan Chioran	voice and stage actor at the Stratford Festival
Ins Choi	actor, playwright of Kim's Convenience
Sasha Clements	actress
Nora Fatehi	singer, actress, Indian film industry, Bollywood
Megan Crewe	writer of young adult books
deMarco DeCiccio	vocalist with the contemporary, openly gay Christian and music duo Jason and deMarco
Gerry Dee	comedian (Last Comic Standing)
Bonnie Devine	artist, curator, and writer
Orville Lloyd Douglas	poet, writer
Robert Duncan	composer
Matt Dusk	jazz musician
Matthew Earnest	director
Will Ferguson	travel writer and novelist, winner of the Scotiabank Giller Prize
Melyssa Ford	model and actress, on-air personality for Sirius Satellite Radio
Friyie	musician
Thea Gill	actress (Queer as Folk)
Douglas Glover	writer, recipient of Governor General's Award for Fiction
Elaine Goble	visual artist
Kim Gordon	singer and bassist of experimental rock band Sonic Youth
Andil Gosine	artist, scholar, and curator
Katherine Govier	novelist, winner of Marian Engel Award
Larysa Harapyn	entertainment reporter for CityTV
Nene Humphrey	artist
Mark Irwin	cinematographer (Me, Myself & Irene, Scream, There's Something About Mary)
Tanja Jacobs	actor and director
Tina Jung	actress
K-os	musician
Allen Kaeja	dance artist
Amrit Kaur	Canadian actress (The Sex Lives of College Girls)
Jillian Keiley	director
Kid Twist	musician
K'naan	musician
Vikas Kohli	producer and founder of Fatlabs
Bruce LaBruce	underground filmmaker and icon of the gay arts community (JD's, Vinyl)
Ringo Lam	Hong Kong action director, inspired Quentin Tarantino's Reservoir Dogs
Jerry Levitan	producer and star of Oscar Award-nominated animated short I Met the Walrus
Canisia Lubrin	poet
Charmaine Lurch	artist and educator
Kate Lushington	theatre artist and teacher
Peter Lynch	filmmaker (Project Grizzly)
Rachel McAdams	actress
Steve McCaffery	poet
Allyson Mitchell	Toronto-based artist
Michelle Mohabeer	filmmaker, later also a professor at York
Annemarie Morais	filmmaker (How She Move)
Jeffrey Morgan	authorized biographer of Alice Cooper and Iggy Pop & The Stooges
Mike Murley	jazz musician, recipient of Juno Award
George Murray	poet
Mathew Murray	web series creator, filmmaker
Ruba Nadda	film director
Kardinal Offishall	Canadian musician
Steven Page	musician, former lead singer for the Barenaked Ladies
Zoie Palmer	actress
Ramona Pringle	actor (Shoot 'Em Up)
Dina Pugliese	television personality, co-host of CityTV's Breakfast Television
Maitreyi Ramakrishnan	actress Never Have I Ever (TV series)
Simone Rapisarda Casanova	filmmaker
Michael Redhill	poet, playwright, and novelist, editorial board of Coach House Press
Nino Ricci	writer, recipient of Governor General's Award for Fiction
Spencer Rice	actor, director (Kenny vs. Spenny)
Diane Roberts	English-born, Canadian-based theatre director, co-founder of Obsidian Theatre
Peter Robinson	English-born Canadian-based detective novelist
Lina Rodriguez	filmmaker and screenwriter
Sophy Romvari	film director, writer, and actress
Don Ross	fingerstyle guitar champion, lauded by Bruce Cockburn
Anusree Roy	actor and playwright
Nora Samosir	Indonesian actress
Jacqueline Samuda	actress and author
Albert Schultz	actor
Eddie Schwartz	songwriter/producer (The Doobie Brothers, Pat Benatar)
Ushna Shah	Pakistani actress
Lilly Singh	comedian/television host/YouTuber
Sarah Slean	singer-songwriter
Ron Sparks	comedian/actor/writer (Video on Trial)
Joel A. Sutherland	author
Susan Swan	author
Priya Thomas	musician
Raymond Thompson	creator of hit New Zealand teen/sci-fi television series The Tribe
Scott Thompson	comedian/actor (The Kids in the Hall, The Larry Sanders Show, My Fabulous Gay Wedding)
Larry Towell	celebrated photographer
Laura Vandervoort	actress (Smallville, Instant Star, Into the Blue 2)
Leighton Alexander Williams	actor, playwright
Maurice Dean Wint	actor, nominated for a Dora Award
Kristy Yang	Chinese-born Canadian actress
Katheryn Winnick	actress and martial artist

=== Scientists ===
Name	Notability
Ellen Bialystok	psychologist, winner of the Killiam Prize
Nigel Lockyer	director of TRIUMF, Canada's National Laboratory for Particle and Nuclear Physics
Steve MacLean	astronaut
Rosalind C. Morris	anthropologist and cultural critic at Columbia University, 2022 recipient of the Guggenheim Fellowship
Helen Rodd	zoologist
Bridget Stutchbury	natural scientist and writer; author of Silence of the Songbirds and The Bird Detective
Debra W. Soh	sex science writer
Scott D. Tanner	chemist, co-inventor of mass cytometry and the collision/reaction cell

=== Athletes ===
Name	Notability
Alon Badat	Israeli-Canadian soccer player
Karen Cockburn	Olympic medallist, trampoline (silver in 2008 & 2004, bronze in 2000)
Andre Durie	Canadian football player
Ricky Foley	Canadian football player
Sean Foudy	Canadian football player
Bill Hatanaka	Canadian football player
Adam Henrich	professional ice hockey player
Frank Hoffmann	Canadian football player
Melissa Humana-Paredes	Canadian beach volleyball player (Silver Medalist at the 2024 Paris Olympics, Gold Medalist at the 2019 Beach Volleyball World Championships, 4th at the 2017 Beach Volleyball World Championships)
Jeff Johnson	Canadian football player
Tuğba Karademir	two time Olympian, representing Turkey in figure skating at the 2006 and 2010 Winter Olympics
Carlos Newton	mixed martial artist (former UFC Welterweight Champion)
Melissa Pagnotta	Canadian taekwondo athlete; competed for Canada in the women's 67 kg event at the 2016 Summer Olympics
Dontae Richards-Kwok	Canadian sprinter
Trish Stratus	former professional wrestler, known for most Women's Championship reigns (seven)
Ari Taub	Olympic Greco-Roman wrestler
Alexandria Town	freestyle wrestler, first Canadian to win a gold medal at the World U23 Wrestling Championships
James Tuck	Canadian football player
Mathieu Turgeon	Olympic medallist, trampoline (bronze in 2000)
Taylor Wilde	former professional wrestler (Youngest TNA Women's Knockout Champion (2008) and first Knockout in TNA history to win the singles and tag team Knockout titles (2009))
Brandie Wilkerson	Canadian beach volleyball player (Silver Medalist at the 2024 Paris Olympics, 2nd at the 2022 Beach Volleyball World Championships, 5th at the 2017 Beach Volleyball World Championships)

=== Broadcasters ===
Name	Notability
Barbara Budd	senior journalist with the CBC
Daniel Dale	fact-checker for CNN, formerly Washington bureau chief for the Toronto Star
Ken Daniels	former Hockey Night in Canada host, current Detroit Red Wings commentator on FSN Detroit
Melissa DiMarco	TV personality and actress, has her own show and a role on Degrassi: The Next Generation
Nancy Durham	journalist and foreign correspondent for the CBC, married to Oxford philosopher Bill Newton-Smith
Matt Galloway	CBC Radio One host, Metro Morning
Jian Ghomeshi	CBC host, musician, writer and producer
Michael Harris	Ottawa Sun columnist, Woodrow Wilson Scholar
Chantal Hebert	journalist for The Toronto Star, Le Devoir, National Post and others; commentator on Canadian politics; appears often on Canadian Broadcasting Corporation
Michael Hirsh	co-founder of Nelvana international animation company based in Toronto (Babar, Hergé's Adventures of Tintin, Bob and Margaret)
Mark Jones	ESPN and ABC play-by-play sports broadcaster
Paul Jones	play-by-play commentator for the Toronto Raptors
Patrick Loubert	co-founder of Nelvana
Hazel Mae	news anchor and personality on Sportsnet
Jonathan Mann	journalist for CNN International
Ginella Massa	television presenter, newscaster, and journalist
Brian Milner	senior columnist for The Globe and Mail
Jacquie Perrin	host of CBC's Saturday Report, accomplished pilot
B.W. Powe	writer and columnist for The Globe and Mail
Dina Pugliese	co-host of Breakfast Television on CityTV in Toronto
Sandie Rinaldo	CTV news anchor for all of Canada
Paula Todd	journalist and host of TVOntario's Person to Person and CTV's The Verdict

=== Other ===
Name	Notability
Gord Ash	former Toronto Blue Jays General Manager (1995–2001) and current Milwaukee Brewers assistant to the General Manager
Harry Black	humanitarian, former executive director of UNICEF Canada
Gwen Boniface	former Commissioner of the Ontario Provincial Police
Guy Bujold	President of the Canadian Space Agency
Nerys Dockery	Ambassador from Saint Kitts and Nevis
Marlys Edwardh	civil rights lawyer who represented Maher Arar
Ward P.D. Elcock	former Director of the Canadian Security Intelligence Service
Susan Eng	former chair of the Toronto Police Services Board, Director of Canadian Civil Liberties Association
Melyssa Ford	model and BET personality
Cecil Foster	novelist, essayist and sociologist
Mitchell Goldhar	founder, SmartCentres REIT
Edward Greenspan	criminal defense lawyer (clients include Conrad Black among others)
Alexander Haditaghi	founder, owner and chairman of Pacific Mortgage Company
Wilson A. Head	human rights activist
Edmund Ho	Chief Executive of Macau Special Administrative Region of the People's Republic of China
Ahmed Hussen	President of the Canadian Somali Congress
Faisal Kutty	lawyer, law professor, writer and human rights activist
Sheldon Levy	President and Vice-Chancellor of Ryerson University
Gavin MacKenzie	Treasurer (the head) of the Law Society of Upper Canada
James MacKinnon	head of the Economics department at Queen's University
Jay Manuel	creative director of America's Next Top Model as well as Canada's Next Top Model
Michael Marder	philosopher
Deborah McCawley	former chief executive officer for the Law Society of Manitoba, currently sitting as a Manitoba judge
Naana Jane Opoku-Agyemang	First female Vice President, Republic of Ghana
Joseph Pivato	literary critic, professor and Italian-Canadian writer
Julian Porter	former Commissioner of the Toronto Transit Commission and President of the Canadian National Exhibition
Victoria Pratt	actress, fitness model, fitness writer
Pat Quinn	former coach of the Toronto Maple Leafs NHL hockey team; member of the Hockey Hall of Fame
David Rocco	celebrity chef, actor and producer
Clayton Ruby	criminal defense lawyer
Bea Rose Santiago	Miss International 2013
David Saunders	former Dean of Smith School of Business, Queen's University
Kim Sawchuk	academic and Associate Dean of Research and Graduate Studies for the Faculty of Arts and Science at Concordia University
Lyal S. Sunga	specialist in international human rights, humanitarian law and international criminal law
Tom Traves	President and Vice-Chancellor of Dalhousie University
Sylvana Windsor, Countess of St Andrews	academic and historian
Tom Wright	former commissioner of the Canadian Football League, former president of Adidas Canada
Shadya Yasin	social activist, poet and teacher
Alan Young	Canadian constitutional lawyer and civil rights activist

== Notable faculty ==
=== Engineering ===
Name	Notability
Michael Daly	Engineer, namesake of an asteroid (2016) and lead scientist on the NASA-led mission OSIRIS-REx mission
Ping Wang	Engineer, Fellow of the Institute of Electrical and Electronics Engineers for "her contributions to radio resource allocation and performance modeling of heterogeneous wireless networks."

=== Other ===
Name	Notability
Irving Abella	history
James Alcock	psychology professor, author, and parapsychology skeptic
Louise Arbour	Professor of Law, currently UN High Commissioner for Human Rights
Harry Arthurs	law and former president of York University
Paul Axelrod	education
Joel Bakan	law, author of The Corporation
Shannon Bell	performance philosopher, political scientist, feminist
James Beveridge	filmmaker and educator; founder of York's Department of Film
Hédi Bouraoui	French and English literature
Rob Bowman	ethnomusicology
Ed Broadbent	former leader of the federal New Democratic Party (1960s)
Jean-Gabriel Castel	Professor Emeritus of Law
Jerome Ch'en	Professor Emeritus of History
G. Ramsay Cook	Professor Emeritus of History
Christopher Dewdney	author, Professor of English Literature
Susan Dion	Professor of Education
Lynne Fernie	film studies
Markus Giesler	Schulich Marketing Professor, named one of the 40 best business school professors under the age of 40 in the world
Stephen Gill	Distinguished Research Professor of Political Science, Fellow of the Royal Society of Canada
Wenona Giles	professor emerita in the Department of Anthropology, Fellow of the Royal Society of Canada
Barbara Godard	Professor of English and the Avie Bennett Historica Chair in Canadian Literature
Jack Granatstein	Professor Emeritus of History
Christopher D. Green	Professor of Psychology and Philosophy, President-elect of the Society for the History of Psychology (APA Division 26)
Leslie Green	Professor, Law, Philosophy, and Social and Political Thought, permanent chair in Jurisprudence at the University of Oxford
Michael Greyeyes	Actor/Choreographer
John Greyson	film director
Peter Hogg	Professor Emeritus of Law, constitutional expert, former Dean of Osgoode
David A. Hood	Professor of Exercise Physiology
Michiel Horn	Professor Emeritus of History, University Historian
Jacques Israelievitch	violinist, member of the Order of Canada
Carl E. James	Sociologist, professor of education
Ali Kazimi	filmmaker
Ruth Koleszar-Green	Professor of Social Work, Indigenous activist
Gabriel Kolko	Professor Emeritus of History
Bonita Lawrence	Associate Professor, Department of Equity Studies, Indigenous rights activist
Irving Layton	poet
Jack Layton	leader of the New Democratic Party
James Laxer	author, columnist and commentator, Professor of Canadian Politics
Lee Lorch	Professor Emeritus of Mathematics, civil rights activist, member of Cuban Academy of Sciences
Edelgard Mahant	political science
Aryn Martin	Associate Dean, sociologist, medical historian, and scholar of feminist science and technology studies
Deborah McGregor	Whitefish River Ojibway environmentalist, educator
David T. McNab	Métis historian
Patrick J. Monahan	Professor of Law
Heather Monroe-Blum	Principal and Vice-Chancellor of McGill University
Jonathan Nitzan	Professor of Political Economy
David F. Noble	Historian of Technology
Michael Ondaatje	author and filmmaker, Professor of English Literature
Leo Panitch	Distinguished Research Professor of Political Science (Canada Research Chair in Political Economy), editor of the Socialist Register
Andreas Papandreou	Greek Prime Minister, Economics Professor (1969–1974)
William Phillips	Professor of Economics, notable for his contribution in economics with the Phillips Curve
Joseph Pivato	Visiting professor, Mariano Elia Chair in Italian-Canadian Studies (1987–88), writer, scholar, professor at Athabasca University
Sergei M. Plekhanov	Professor of Political Science, member of Soviet Academy of Sciences
B. W. Powe	Professor of English
John Ridpath	Objectivist philosopher and retired associate professor of Economics and Intellectual History
Paul Roazen	Professor Emeritus of Social and Political Science, founder of meta-psychotherapy
Neil Leon Rudenstine	Professor Emeritus of Political Science, former president of Harvard University
Anne E. Russon	Professor of Psychology, expert on Orangutan innovation and intelligence
Marlis Schweitzer	Chair of the Department of Theatre
Trichy Sankaran	Indian carnatic percussionist
J.T. Saywell	Professor Emeritus of History
Sam Schachter	Olympic volleyball player; volleyball coach
Signa Daum Shanks	Professor of Law
Vivian Stamatopoulos	Teaching Award winner, long-term care advocate
David N. Stamos	Professor of Philosophy
Grant Strate	founder of York's Dance department and first resident choreographer of National Ballet of Canada
Orest Subtelny	Professor of History
Priscila Uppal	professor of creative writing nominated for Griffin Poetry Prize
Ingrid Veninger	actress, writer, director, producer, and film professor
Deanne Williams	author and historian
Ellen Wood	historian and critic of political theory
Neal Wood	historian
Robin Wood	Professor Emeritus of Film and Video, film critic
Gillian E Wu	Professor Emerita of Science, former Dean of Pure and Applied Science, immunologist

=== Distinguished Research Professors / University Professors ===
The ranks of "Distinguished Research Professor" and "University Professor" are the highest a professor can achieve at York University. There may be at most thirty of either type at any time. The title of Distinguished Research Professor is awarded to faculty who have made outstanding contributions to the university through their work in research, while a University Professor has "demonstrated a commitment to participation in University life and/or contribution to the University as a community" as well as teaching and scholarship.

Name	Year of award & notability
Eshrat Arjomandi	2006: Computer Science & Engineering, Science & Engineering
Pat Armstrong	2010: Sociology, Liberal Arts & Professional Studies
Gerald O. Aspirall	1988: Chemistry, Science
Isabella C. Bakker	2014: Political Science, Liberal Arts & Professional Studies
Norbert Bartel	2006: Physics & Astronomy, Science & Engineering
Dawn Bazely	2017: Biology, Science
Russell Belk	2014: Schulich School of Business
Ellen Bialystok	2003: Psychology, Arts
Diethard Bohme	1995: Chemistry, Pure & Applied Science
John Bosher	1989: History, Arts
Deborah Britzman	2006: Education
James Carley	2000: English, Arts
Jean-Gabriel Castel	1986: Osgoode Hall Law School
Jerome Ch’en	1984: History, Arts
Lorraine Code	1998: Philosophy, Arts
J. Douglas Crawford	2013: Psychology, Health
Kenneth Davey	1984: Biology, Science
Sheila Embleton	2009: Languages, Literatures & Linguistics, Liberal Arts & Professional Studies
Norman Endler	1996: Psychology, Arts
Stephen Gill	2006: Political Science, Arts
Jack Granatstein	1994: History, Arts
Leslie S. Greenberg	2010: Psychology, Health
Philip Gulliver	1985: Anthropology, Arts
Henry S. Harris	1984: Philosophy, Glendon
Robert Haynes	1986: Biology, Science
Michael Herren	1999: Humanities, Atkinson
Eric Hessels	2006: Physics & Astronomy, Science & Engineering
Richard Hornsey	2015: Electrical Engineering, Lassonde School of Engineering
Ian Howard	1988: Psychology, Arts
Allan Hutchinson	2006: Osgoode Hall Law School
Christopher Innes	1997: English, Arts
Ian Jarvie	1993: Philosophy, Arts
Michael Kater	1992: History, Atkinson
Gabriel Kolko	1986: History, Arts
A. B. P. Lever	1998: Chemistry, Pure & Applied Science
Clifford Leznoff	2003: Chemistry, Pure & Applied Science
Paul Lovejoy	1997: History, Arts
John C. McConnell	2005: Earth & Space Science & Engineering, Science & Engineering
Kent McNeil	2008: Osgoode Hall Law School
Peter Moens	1991: Biology, Pure & Applied Science
Gareth Morgan	1992: Administrative Studies
H. V. Nelles	2001: History, Arts
Ralph W. Nicholls	1983: Physics, Science
John O’Neill	1983: Sociology, Arts
Hiroshi Ono	2001: Psychology, Arts
Leo Panitch	1999: Political Science, Arts
Debra Pepler	2008: Psychology, Health
Huw Pritchard	1983: Chemistry, Science
David M. Regan	1992: Psychology, Arts
Marcia H. Rioux	2013: Health Policy & Management, Health
Nicholas Rogers	2011: History, Liberal Arts & Professional Studies
Beryl Rowland	1983: English, Arts
Stuart Shanker	2005: Psychology, Atkinson Faculty of Liberal & Professional Studies
Gordon Shepherd	1993: Earth & Space Science, Pure & Applied Science
K. W. Michael Siu	2008: Chemistry, Science & Engineering
Brian Slattery	2008: Osgoode Hall Law School
Donald Smiley	1984: Political Science, Arts
Martin Steinbach	2000: Psychology, Atkinson Faculty of Liberal & Professional Studies
Bridget Stutchbury	2009: Biology, Science & Engineering
James Tenney	1995: Music, Fine Arts
George Tourlakis	2007: Computer Science & Engineering, Science & Engineering
John Tsotsos	2008: Computer Science & Engineering, Science & Engineering
Reginald Whitaker	2001: Political Science, Arts
Jianhong Wu	2011: Mathematics & Statistics, Science & Engineering

== Presidents ==
Name	Notability	Term
Murray G. Ross	academic	1959–1970
David Slater	economist and civil servant	1970–1973
H. Ian Macdonald	economist and civil servant	1973–1984
Harry W. Arthurs	lawyer and academic	1985–1992
Susan Mann	historian and academic	1993–1997
Lorna Marsden	academic and politician	1997–2008
Mamdouh Shoukri	academic	2008–2017
Rhonda Lenton	academic	2017–present

== Chancellors ==
Name	Notability	Term
Wilfred A. Curtis	RCAF air marshal	1959–1968
Floyd S. Chalmers	publisher	1968–1973
Walter L. Gordon	federal cabinet minister	1973–1977
John P. Robarts	premier of Ontario	1977–1982
John S. Proctor	banker	1982–1983
J. Tuzo Wilson	geophysicist	1983–1986
Larry Clarke	founder of SPAR Aerospace	1986–1991
Oscar Peterson	jazz piano great	1991–1994
Arden Haynes	businessman	1994–1998
Avie J. Bennett	businessman	1998–2004
Peter deCarteret Cory	jurist	2004–2008
Roy McMurtry	politician and judge	2008–2014
Greg Sorbara	former Ontario Minister of Finance	2014–2023
Kathleen Taylor	businesswoman	2023–present
