= Clearbrook =

Clearbrook or Clear Brook may refer to:

== Places ==
=== Canada ===
- Clearbrook, Alberta
- Clearbrook, Abbotsford, British Columbia

=== United Kingdom ===
- Clearbrook, Devon, village

=== United States ===
- Clear Brook (Nanticoke River tributary), a stream in Delaware
- Clearbrook, Minnesota
- Clearbrook, New Jersey
- Clear Brook, Virginia

== Other uses ==
- Clear Brook High School, in Harris County, Texas
- Clearbrook Human Service Agency in Illinois
- Clearbrook, a fictional female wolfrider elf from the comic book series Elfquest
