= Brian Rogers =

Brian Rogers may refer to:

- Brian Rogers (baseball) (born 1982), relief pitcher in Major League Baseball
- Brian Rogers (fighter) (born 1984), American mixed martial arts fighter
- Brian D. Rogers (born 1950), chancellor of the University of Alaska Fairbanks
- Brian Rogers (academic), psychologist and academic
- Brian Rogers, drummer for American reggae band The Toyes
- The Brian Rogers Connection, in-house dance troupe on the UK television series 3-2-1
- Brian Rogers (Home and Away), fictional character from Australian soap opera Home and Away
- Brian Rogers, guitarist for American indie rock bands Self and Fluid Ounces
