= Zoe Todd =

Anthropologist and scholar of Indigenous studies

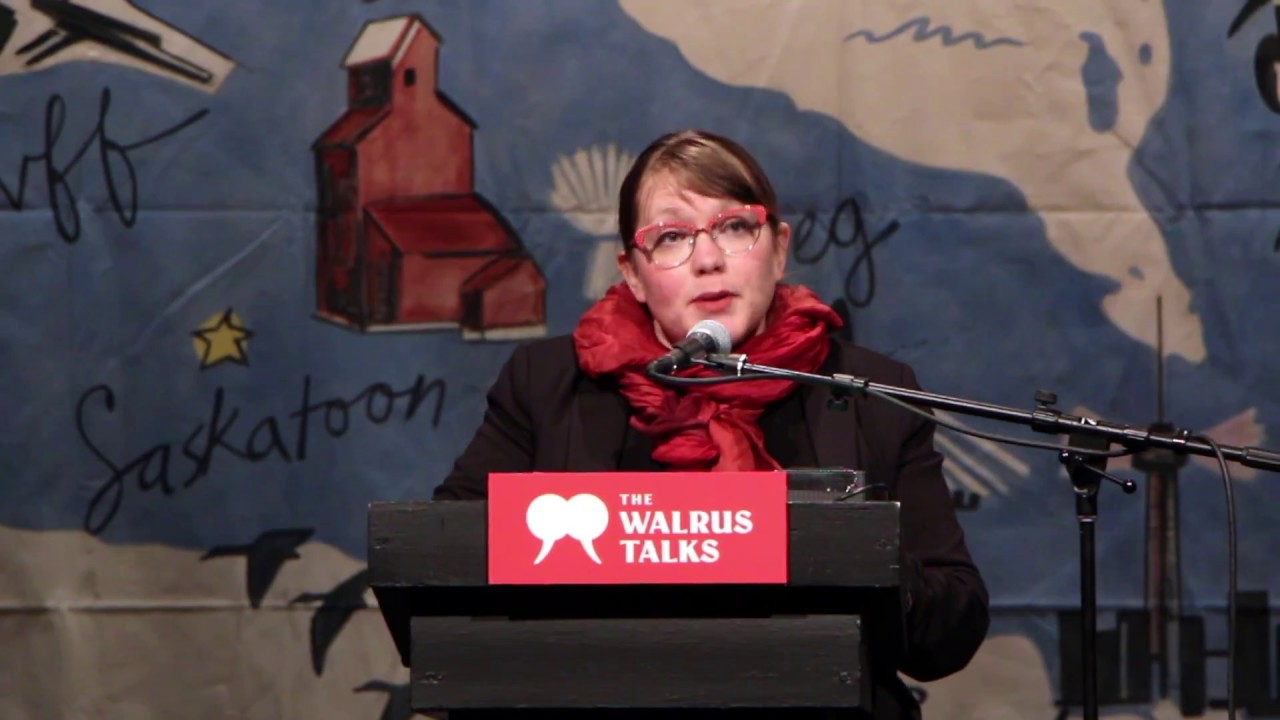
- Born: 1983 (age 42–43); Edmonton, Alberta, Canada
- Occupations: Anthropologist, professor, artist
- Awards: Pierre Elliott Trudeau Foundation Scholarship

Academic background
- Education: University of Alberta, University of Aberdeen
- Influences: Vanessa Watts, Leroy Little Bear, Kim TallBear, Natasha Myers, Donna Haraway, Val Napoleon, Loretta Todd

Academic work
- Discipline: Anthropology, sociology, Indigenous studies, science & technology studies, human-animal studies
- Institutions: Carleton University, Banff Centre, Yale University
- Notable ideas: Indigenizing the anthropocene
- Influenced: Kim TallBear, Natasha Myers, Donna Haraway

Zoe Todd is a Métis anthropologist and scholar of Indigenous studies, human-animal studies, science and technology studies and the Anthropocene. She is an associate professor in the Department of Indigenous Studies at Simon Fraser University and a Presidential Visiting Fellow at Yale University during the 2018–19 academic year.

== Early life ==
Todd was born to a Métis father and white mother in Edmonton, Alberta, in 1983. She credits her father, an artist, Gary Todd's engagement with his Métis heritage as an influential factor in her scholarship; especially his art and his knowledge of fish and wildlife of the Canadian prairies. Todd is a descendant of William Todd, a 19th-century surgeon from the British Navy. She received her BSc degree in biological sciences and an MSc in rural sociology from the University of Alberta and her PhD in social anthropology from the University of Aberdeen. She received the prestigious Pierre Elliott Trudeau Foundation Scholarship in 2011 for her PhD research.

== Research ==
Todd's research concerns human-animal relations, in particular, human-fish, relationships in the context of Settler colonialism in Canada. She is an assistant professor at Carleton University's Department of Sociology and Anthropology. She is best known for her work on decolonizing anthropology and Indigenous perspectives on the Anthropocene. She has been a faculty at the Banff Centre for Arts & Creativity. In 2018, she became a Visiting Assistant Professor at Yale University's Program in History of Science & Medicine.

She has been featured on the CBC, Walrus Talks, Buzzfeed, Rabble and many others on Indigenous issues, feminism, environment, colonialism, capitalism and rape culture. Todd is also known for her artistic work, which are mostly inspired by the freshwater fish of Alberta. In 2018, she was interviewed by Sarain Fox on her work on Indigenous perspectives on the Anthropocene for the Art Gallery of Ontario podcast Into the Anthropocene.

== Selected works ==
Academic works:

- Todd, Zoe. (2018). "Refracting colonialism in Canada: fish tales, text, and insistent public grief". In Mark Jackson, editor. Coloniality, Ontology, and the Question of the Posthuman. Routledge Press.
- Todd, Z. (2015). "Indigenizing the Anthropocene", pp. 241–254 in Heather Davis and Etienne Turpin, editors, Art in the Anthropocene: Encounters Among Aesthetics, Politics, Environment and Epistemology. . Open Humanities Press.
- Davis, Heather and Zoe Todd. (2017). On the importance of a date, or, decolonizing the Anthropocene. ACME: An International Journal for Critical Geographies.
- Todd, Zoe (2017). "Fish, Kin, and Hope: tending to water violations in amiskwaciwâskahikan and Treaty Six Territory". Afterall: A Journal of Art, Context and Inquiry 43(1): 102–107.
- Todd, Zoe (2016). "How do you teach about the layered colonial realities that mould a Canadian city?" (commentary). Aboriginal Policy Studies 6(1): 90–97. (Invited piece)
- Todd, Z. (2016). "An Indigenous Feminist's Take on the Ontological Turn: 'Ontology' is just another word for colonialism". Journal of Historical Sociology 29(1): 4–22.
- Todd, Z. (2014). "Fish pluralities: Human-animal relations and sites of engagement in Paulatuuq, Arctic Canada". Etudes/Inuit/Studies 38(1-2): 217–238.

Other writing:

- "Rethinking Aesthetics and Ontology through Indigenous Law: On the work of Val Napoleon and Loretta Todd". C Magazine 126, 2015: 10–17.
- "Creating citizen spaces through Indigenous soundscapes". Spacing Magazine. 1 October 2014.
- "On Scottish Independence — a Metis Perspective". ActiveHistory.ca, 3 December 2013.
- "Remembering Indigenous Edmonton: a journey through plants". Spacing Edmonton, 4 April 2013.
