= George Butterfield =

George Butterfield may refer to:

- George Butterfield (athlete) (1879–1917), British athlete
- George Butterfield (businessman) (born 1939), Canadian businessman and philanthropist
- G. K. Butterfield (George Kenneth Butterfield, Jr., born 1947), U.S. Representative from North Carolina
