= Rainbow Country =

- Local services board
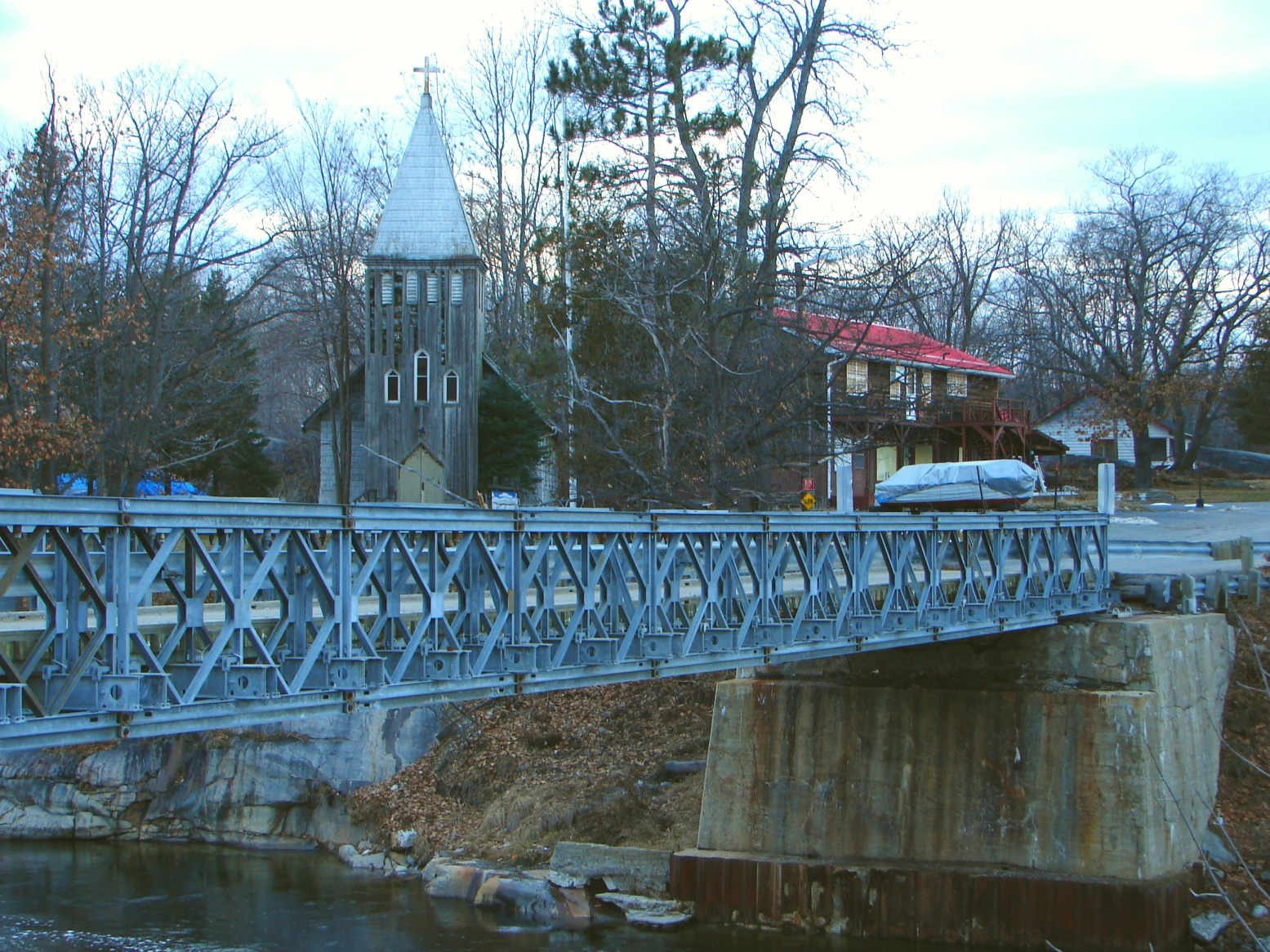
- Whitefish Falls, Ontario, with a Bailey bridge in the foreground
- Interactive map of Rainbow Country
- Country: Canada
- Province: Ontario
- District: Sudbury, Manitoulin

Government
  - Type: Local services board
  - MP: Jim Belanger (Conservative)
  - MPP: Bill Rosenberg (PC)

Population (2016)
  - Total: 307
- Time zone: UTC-5 (EST)
  - Summer (DST): UTC-4 (EDT)
- Area code: 705

Rainbow Country is a local services board in the Canadian province of Ontario. It encompasses and provides services to the communities of Whitefish Falls and Willisville in the Unorganized North Sudbury District and Birch Island and McGregor Bay in the Manitoulin District.

It is the administrative headquarters of the Whitefish River Ojibwe First Nations band government.

== Communities ==
=== Whitefish Falls ===
Whitefish Falls (46°06′N 81°43′W) is located in the geographic township of Mongowin, in the Sudbury District. Whitefish Falls lies on Highway 6, and is approximately 20 kilometres south of Espanola and 25 kilometres north of Little Current.

Whitefish Falls is situated around the mouth of the Whitefish River at Lake Huron, just downstream from a picturesque waterfall. It is a popular tourist destination in the summer months, and is also the site of the annual La Cloche Art Show.

A reunion of the popular Canadian CBC TV show Adventures in Rainbow Country was held here in August 2006. Cast, locals and fans were present. The show was shot in the region in 1969.

The small church that was called St. Augustine's (Anglican) is now closed, was built by a company by the name of Mc Dermid. George Smyth of Ice Lake on the Manitoulin island, who worked for McDermid, made all the cement blocks by hand. He married Ernest Willis's (Willisville) youngest daughter Kathleen in the Church after it was completed in 1937. The carpenter on the job was Albert Shepherd of the Manitoulin Island. The minister in 1937 was the Rev. Worden Stump.

In 2018, Ontario Northland announced a major service expansion west of Sudbury, which included Whitefish Falls as a flag stop. Westbound buses travel onto Manitoulin Island, while eastbound buses travel to Sudbury via Espanola and Nairn. This service ended in 2019.

=== Willisville ===
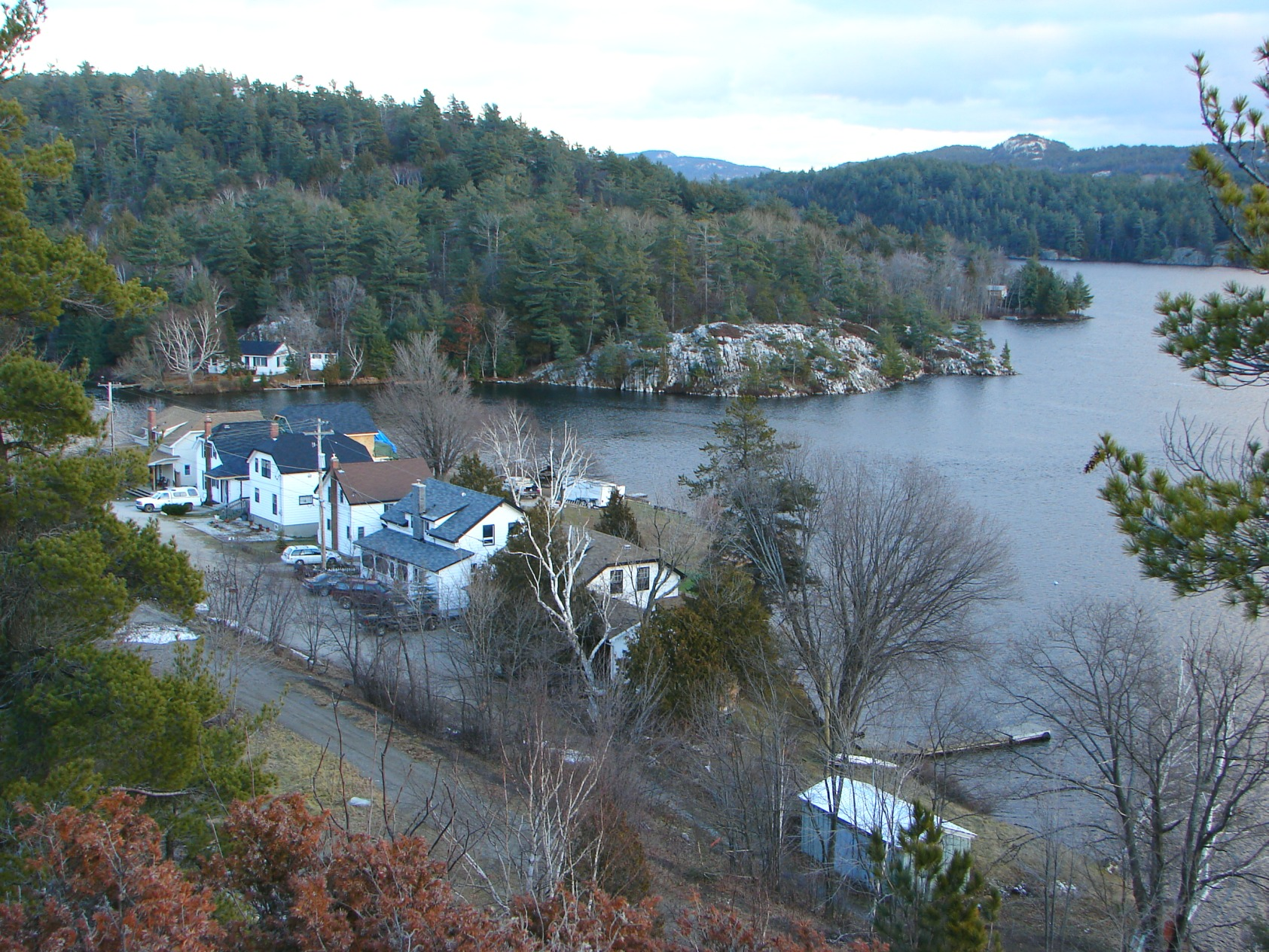
Willisville

Willisville is on the Charlton-Cranberry-Frood Lake system in the heart of the La Cloche Mountains. It is named for Ernest Willis, the community's first postmaster who settled the community in 1910.

Ernest was originally from the Isle of Wight in England and came to Canada with his Willis family in 1875 aboard the Vicksburg. They settled in Howland Township on Manitoulin Island. Ernest married Ada Humphrey from the Manitouwaning area of the island. Some of their nine children were born on the Island and the youngest ones at Willisville. Ernest was a Forest Ranger and he and Ada used to portage canoes through the back lakes as far as Killarney checking the area for fires. Before Cameron’s opened a store in Whitefish Falls, Ernest would canoe and portage to Espanola to purchase supplies for his family. When the Algoma Eastern Railway was opened from Sudbury to Little Current, Ernest opened a store at Willisville and stocked supplies for sale to the residents and cottagers and for their own use. Later they rented the cabins to tourists who came to enjoy the fishing and scenery.

In the early days of St. Augustine’s Mission in Whitefish Falls, The community around the Mission consisted of mostly native people and two white families, namely the John Cameron and the Ernest Willis families. At the beginning of World War I, more white families were moving into the area and it was decided that there was a need for a school in the Mission area. Chief Keshigobiness, known as Big John and Mr. Ernest Willis who assisted him greatly, worked under great difficulty in procuring a school. They were guided by Bishop Thornloe and finally were able to open a school for those who wished to attend.

The first school was in the home of Big John and opened on October 13, 1916, by Rev S. H. Ferris of Garden River. Mr. Duncan Bell was the first teacher. The school continued until a fire burned down the log house, but a new building was soon found and some 20 children were gathered and taught until a proper school was built. Big John and Ernest walked from one lumber camp to another and begged for lumber or money and the new building was erected in 1917.

The Willis, Golden & other children from Willisville would walk along a path to the horseshoe curve and down the track to Whitefish Falls to attend school. In 1931, Kathleen Willis and Dewey Golden were the first two students to pass their Entrance exams at the school. Both went on to further studies.

According to a community website, the entire community operates as a de facto condominium, with all community spaces jointly owned by its residents.

An 80-foot fire tower was built on Willisville Mountain in the 1920s by the Ontario Department of Lands and Forests.

The tower was run by John Burke in the early years. One day, while he was looking out to spot forest fires from the tower's cupola, he saw a herd of elephants at the bottom of the mountain trail. He called back to headquarters on his bushphone and relayed his sighting. Nobody believed him at first, until locals learned that a circus truck had broken down nearby and the elephants inside had escaped.

World heavyweight boxing champion Joe Louis and singer Bing Crosby are known to have visited the tower and signed its guestbook. The tower can also be seen in the 1960s Canadian television series Adventures in Rainbow Country, which was filmed in the Willisville-Whitefish Falls area.

The tower was dismantled in 1986, but the mountain still remains a popular place for tourists to climb.

=== McGregor Bay ===
McGregor Bay is on the LaCloche Peninsula within the Manitoulin District.

== Demographics ==
The board's jurisdictional area is counted as three separate designated places in Statistics Canada census data. In the Canada 2016 Census, Willisville and Whitefish Falls had a combined population of 297, while McGregor Bay Part A had a population of 10, and McGregor Bay Part B had a population of 0.

== Notable residents ==
- J. Howard Crocker – (Whitefish Falls) Educator and sports executive with the YMCA and Amateur Athletic Union of Canada
- Deborah McGregor – Whitefish River First Nation (Birch Island) Ojibwe environmentalist, educator
