= Lawrence P. Organ =

Canadian businessman (born 1959)

- Organ in December 2016
- Born: Toronto, Ontario, Canada
- Education: York University

Lawrence P. Organ (born November 1959) is a Canadian businessman. He is the founder and former chief executive officer of Chicago, Illinois-based Exact Data, acquired in 2021 by Data Axle. Organ has been an entrepreneur focused on the direct marketing industry since 1986 and is credited with starting a number of companies. He is best known for founding the internet properties of FastWeb and JobsOnline which today are owned, respectively, by Monster Worldwide and Acxiom Corporation.

From June, 2009 until May, 2019 Organ served on the board of directors of Clearbrook, a Chicago not-for-profit organization benefiting 7,000 clients with developmental disabilities. Starting February, 2021 to January, 2022 Organ was chairman of Lift Foundation, an organization dedicated to developing leadership excellence in motivated and talented youth in Tamil Nadu, India. Organ is on the Board of Directors of Ramsay Innovations and is a member of the Killerspin Advisory Board.

== Early life ==
Lawrence Organ was born in November 1959 to Leslie and Barbara Organ in Toronto Canada. His family is Jewish.

== Education ==
Organ earned his B.A. from Glendon College, at York University, Toronto, in 1985.

== Controversy ==
Organ was the topic of a March 27, 2006 Forbes magazine article entitled You Can Surf But You Can't Hide in which the author voiced privacy concerns over ResponderInfo, a product carried by ConsumerBase. That articles lead to discussions in privacy blogs as well as direct marketing sources such as Digital Moses Confidential regarding the lines between privacy and commerce.
