= Aryn Martin =

Sociologist, and historian of biomedicine

- Occupations: Sociologist, historian, professor

Academic background
- Education: Queen's University, York University, Cornell University
- Influences: Michael Lynch, Donna Haraway, Harry Collins, Natasha Myers, Hannah Landecker

Academic work
- Discipline: Sociology of science, science and technology studies
- Institutions: York University
- Notable ideas: Feminist understanding of microchimerism and identity, politics of care in technoscience

Aryn Martin is a sociologist, and historian of biomedicine, as well as a scholar of feminist science and technology studies at York University, where she is an associate professor of sociology. She is affiliated with the graduate programs in social, political, science, technology, and environmental studies. She received her Bachelor of Science in biology at Queen's University, a master's degree in environmental studies at York University, and a PhD in science and technology studies at Cornell University, under the supervision of Michael Lynch. Her work is on feminist theories of the body and biology, especially the implications for identity surrounding the phenomenon of fetomaternal microchimerism and other forms of genetic chimeras. Her dissertation on the history of human chimeras was funded by the National Science Foundation.

In 2017, Martin became the Associate Dean of Students at York University's Faculty of Graduate Studies.
