= Exact Data =

- Type: Private
- Industry: Data broker
- Founded: 2001
- Headquarters: Chicago, Illinois
- Area served: Worldwide
- Key people: Lawrence Organ, CEO
- Products: Postal, Email, and Phone Lists
- Website: www.exactdata.com

Exact Data helps small and medium-sized businesses acquire customers cost effectively, by selling highly targeted consumer and business email, postal and phone audiences. Exact Data is based in Chicago, Illinois and has offices in Los Angeles, California and Deerfield Beach, Florida.

== History ==
Exact Data was founded in 2001 with the name Custom Offers LLC. The company has operated under several names, including Mosaic Data Solutions and ConsumerBase LLC. The company was renamed Exact Data in 2013. Lawrence Organ is the current CEO.

- Founded as Custom Offers LLC, 2001
- Acquired by Mosaic Group, renamed Mosaic Data Solutions, 2002
- Acquired by Organ Worldwide, renamed ConsumerBase LLC, 2003
- Board of Advisors includes Gidon Cohen, Howard Breen, 2003
- Headquartered in Evanston, Illinois. Office in Sterling, Virginia
- Opened technical office in Donetsk, Ukraine 2007
- Jack Kraft added to Board of Advisors, 2006
- Jeff Taylor added to Board of Advisors, 2011
- Ranked No. 1 in data card quality by NextMark, 2 quarters, 2011
- Created ListFinder.com and NetPostmaster.com, 2011
- Robert Blackwell added to Board of Advisors, 2012
- Opened Chicago sales office, 2012
- Created FastCount.com, 2012
- Ranked No. 2,471 (No. 98 in Chicago) on the fifth annual Inc. 500/5000 List of the Nation's Fastest Growing Companies, 2011
- Ranked No. 1,570 (No. 61 in Chicago) on the sixth annual Inc. 500/5000 List of the Nation's Fastest Growing Companies, 2012
- Created ePostmaster.com, 2013
- Ranked No. 1 in data card quality by NextMark, 4 quarters in a row, 2012
- Launched proprietary B2B email and postal database, 2013
- Acquired by Exact Data, merged with Statlistics, March 2013
- Federal Trade Commission sends informal warning letter of possible Fair Credit Report Act Violation, May 2013
- Exact Data mentioned on CBS' 60 Minutes Special, "The Data Brokers: Selling your personal information"
- Ranked No. 3,816 Inc. 500/5000 List of the Nation's Fastest Growing Companies, 2014
- Added social media sales department, 2014
- Ranked No. 1 in data card quality by NextMark for 13 consecutive quarters, 2015
- Los Angeles, CA Sales Office Opened, March 2018
- Boca Raton, FL Sales Office Opened, May 2018
- Florida Sales Office moved from Boca Raton to Deerfield Beach, 2019
- Alerts.com CCPA/privacy compliance tool added to portfolio of products, 2019

Exact Data sources consumer and business data from a national database comprising approximately 210 million names, postal addresses, telephone numbers, and email addresses.

== Products and Services ==
Services include consumer and business mailing, email, and phone lists, modeling, and email marketing deployment and consultation.

== FTC Warns of Possible Privacy Violations ==
On May 7, 2013, the Federal Trade Commission issued a release stating that a test-shopping sting operation through the FTC's Worldwide Privacy Protection Effort indicated that 10 companies, Exact Data ConsumerBase included, were willing to sell consumer information without abiding by the Fair Credit Reporting Act's (FCRA) requirements.

Specifically, it was said that Exact Data ConsumerBase appeared to offer "pre-screened" lists of consumers for use in making firm credit card offers.

The incident aimed to increase awareness and expose data brokerage policies, not necessarily intending to accuse the companies of breaking laws. According to The Washington Post, “This should help raise awareness,” said Laura Berger, an attorney with the Bureau of Consumer Protection. She declined to comment on whether these or other companies are facing full investigations by the FTC.

No actual data purchases were made, but an informal warning letter was sent to the company, as there was no hard evidence of wrongdoing.
