= Clifford Leznoff =

Canadian chemist

Clifford Clarke Leznoff is a Canadian chemist, currently a Distinguished Research Professor at York University.
