= A. B. P. Lever =

Canadian chemist and professor

A. B. P. Lever is a Canadian chemist, and currently a Distinguished Research Professor Emeritus at York University. He is the founding editor of the Elsevier journal Coordination Chemistry Reviews. Lever is known for the Lever electronic parameter, which is similar to the Tolman electronic parameter that is used to characterize ligands in coordination compounds using electrochemistry.
