= Carol Hansell =

Carol Hansell is the founder and Senior Partner of Hansell LLP. Over her more than 25 years in practice, she has led major transactions for public and private corporations and governments. She now leads an independent firm, dedicated to advising boards, management teams, institutional shareholders and regulators in connection with legal and governance challenges. She is regularly engaged in connection with special committee mandates, board investigations, governance reviews, dissident engagements with boards and proxy fights.

Carol has served on boards of organizations across a variety of sectors – public companies, Crown corporations, healthcare, not-for-profit and arts organizations. She currently serves on the boards of the Global Risk Institute in Financial Services, the Toronto Symphony Orchestra and the International Corporate Governance Network (ICGN). She has served on the boards of the Bank of Canada, the Public Sector Pension Investment Board, Toronto East General Hospital and SickKids Foundation, among others. She was inducted as a Fellow of the Institute of Corporate Directors (ICD) in 2013 and received the Lifetime Achievement Award in Investor Relations from IR Magazine Awards - Canada in 2015. Carol is a Founding Trustee and Fellow of the American College of Governance Counsel.

In addition to her board service, Carol has been involved in governance education and thought leadership throughout her career. Most notably, Carol served as the only non-American Chair of the Corporate Governance Committee of the American Bar Association (Business Law Section) and continues to serve as Special Canadian Advisor to the Corporate Laws Committee of the ABA, and has participated in the education of more than 3,500 directors as an instructor in the ICD-Rotman Directors Education Program offered in Toronto and Vancouver.

Carol studied at the University of Western Ontario (B.A. in History 1981), then did an MA in International Relations at the University of Toronto in 1982 and then rose to success after taking the MBA/LLB degree at the prestigious Osgoode Hall Law School and Schulich School of Business, both of York University in Toronto in 1986. She was appointed to the Board of Directors of the Bank of Canada in October 2006. She was also Chair of the American Bar Association's (ABA's) Corporate Governance Committee, Special Canadian Advisor to the ABA's Committee on Corporate Laws, and Special Advisor to the Task Force on the Independence of the Bar established by the Law Society of Upper Canada.
