= Ian P. Howard =

Canadian psychologist (1927–2013)

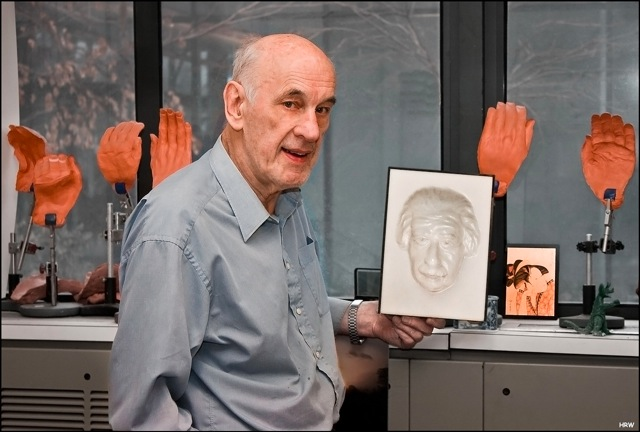
- Howard in 2009
- Born: Ian Porteous Howard; July 20, 1927; Lancashire, England
- Died: June 1, 2013 (aged 85); Toronto, Ontario, Canada
- Education: University of Manchester, Durham University
- Scientific career
- Fields: Psychology, visual perception
- Workplaces: York University

Ian Porteus Howard (July 20, 1927 – June 1, 2013) was a Canadian psychologist and researcher in visual perception at York University in Toronto.

== Life and career ==
Ian Howard was born in Lancashire, England, close to the Yorkshire border. He studied for a BSc at Manchester University, graduating in 1952. Howard held academic positions in Departments of Psychology at Durham University (1953-1964) (from which he obtained his PhD in 1965), at New York University (1965), and at York University in Toronto (1966-2013). At York University, he contributed to the development of the Department of Psychology and, in 1992 founded the Centre for Vision Research (CVR).

While at York, Howard became full professor. Upon retirement in 1993, he became Distinguished Research Professor Emeritus, a position he held until his death.

Howard was renowned for his research into human visual perception.

In June 2013, Howard had an h-index of 35. During his time at York, Howard hired Martin J. Steinbach as his first postdoctoral fellow (1968) and supervised four PhD students.

In 1956, Howard married Antonie (Toni) Eber. They had three children: Ruth, Neil and Martin, and 7 grandchildren: Colin, Graeme, Alice, Shifra, Helah, Eli, and Katie/Mika.

Ian died of cancer on 1 June 2013.

== Research ==
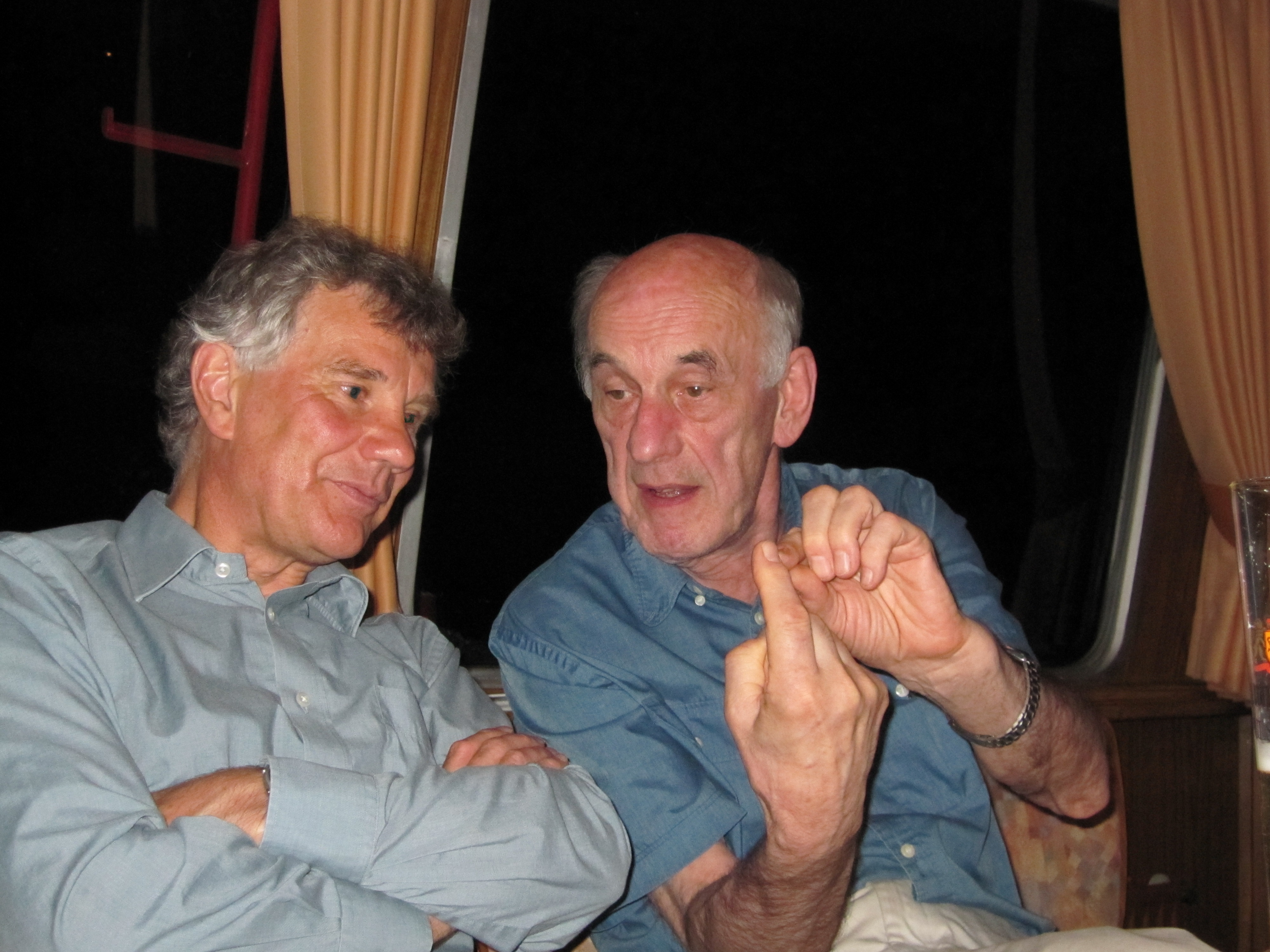
Ian Howard (right) in lively discussion with Brian Rogers. The photo was taken on the Riverboat tour at the ECVP 2009 in Regensburg.

Howard's research areas included human spatial orientation (how we tell whether we are upright or lying down), stereopsis (how we sense the distance of objects from our eyes from the differences in the images in the eyes), eye movements, and perceptual ambiguity. Howard was reluctant to use computer-simulated stimuli for his studies; Howard's approach was to study visual perception in realistic settings with real objects, unlike many others in the field, who studied it using pictures of objects. Realistic settings Howard constructed included a full-size rotating room and a 3-m-diameter sphere. He also researched human orientation in microgravity using the "vomit comet" and the Space Shuttle.

Howard was renowned for his kindness and sense of fun and curiosity. For one example, visitors to Howard's laboratory would inevitably be offered a ride in the rotating room, which contained a sturdy seat into which a willing visitor would be strapped with aircraft-type seatbelts. The seat was on one wall of the room, giving the occupant a view of the rest of the room, consisting of conventional furniture including a coffee table with (at one stage) a Time magazine with Mikhail Gorbachev's photograph on the cover resting on it, a light fitting hanging from the ceiling, a window on the left wall giving a view of a photograph of a natural scene, and the closed entrance door on the right wall. Although the seat could be rotated in the x-y plane (i.e., potentially rolling the occupant around his or her line of sight), the room itself was rotated, giving the same visual consequences as if the occupant had been rolled. Many occupants perceived themselves to be rolling, a phenomenon known as vection.

For another example, while at York he and his wife, Toni, held annual parties at their house for all members of CVR and for anyone else who wanted to attend. The house and yard were filled with puzzles and toys for all guests to enjoy. Outside toys included a zip-line that took riders for an exhilarating ride down through the yard and into trees, and something like an extremely sturdy rotary clothes line with a parachute harness on one arm and a rope on the other. A rider got into the harness and someone else grabbed the rope and ran around the central axis of the device, tugging the rider faster and faster until they were nearly horizontal to the ground because of centrifugal force. One of many experiences of the rider was that they were stationary and the visual world was rotating.

== Published works ==
Apart from more than 100 papers in international refereed journals, Howard also published eight influential books:

- Howard, I. P., & Templeton, W. B. (1966). Human spatial orientation. London: Wiley.
- Howard, I. P. (1982). Human visual orientation. Chichester: John Wiley & Sons.
- Howard, I. P., & Rogers, B. J. (1995). Binocular vision and stereopsis. New York: Oxford University Press.
- Howard, I. P. (2002). Seeing in depth. Vol. 1 Basic mechanisms. Thornhill, Ontario, Canada: I Porteous. 659 pages.
- Howard, I. P., & Rogers, B. J. (2002). Seeing in depth. Vol. 2 Depth perception. Thornhill, Ontario, Canada: I Porteous.
- Howard, I. P. (2012). Perceiving in depth. Volume 1, Basic mechanisms. Oxford: Oxford University Press.
- Howard, I. P., & Rogers, B. J. (2012). Perceiving in depth. Volume 2, Stereoscopic vision. Oxford: Oxford University Press.
- Howard, I. P. (2012). Perceiving in depth. Volume 3, Other mechanisms of depth perception. Oxford: Oxford University Press.
