= Jason and deMarco =

Christian musical duo

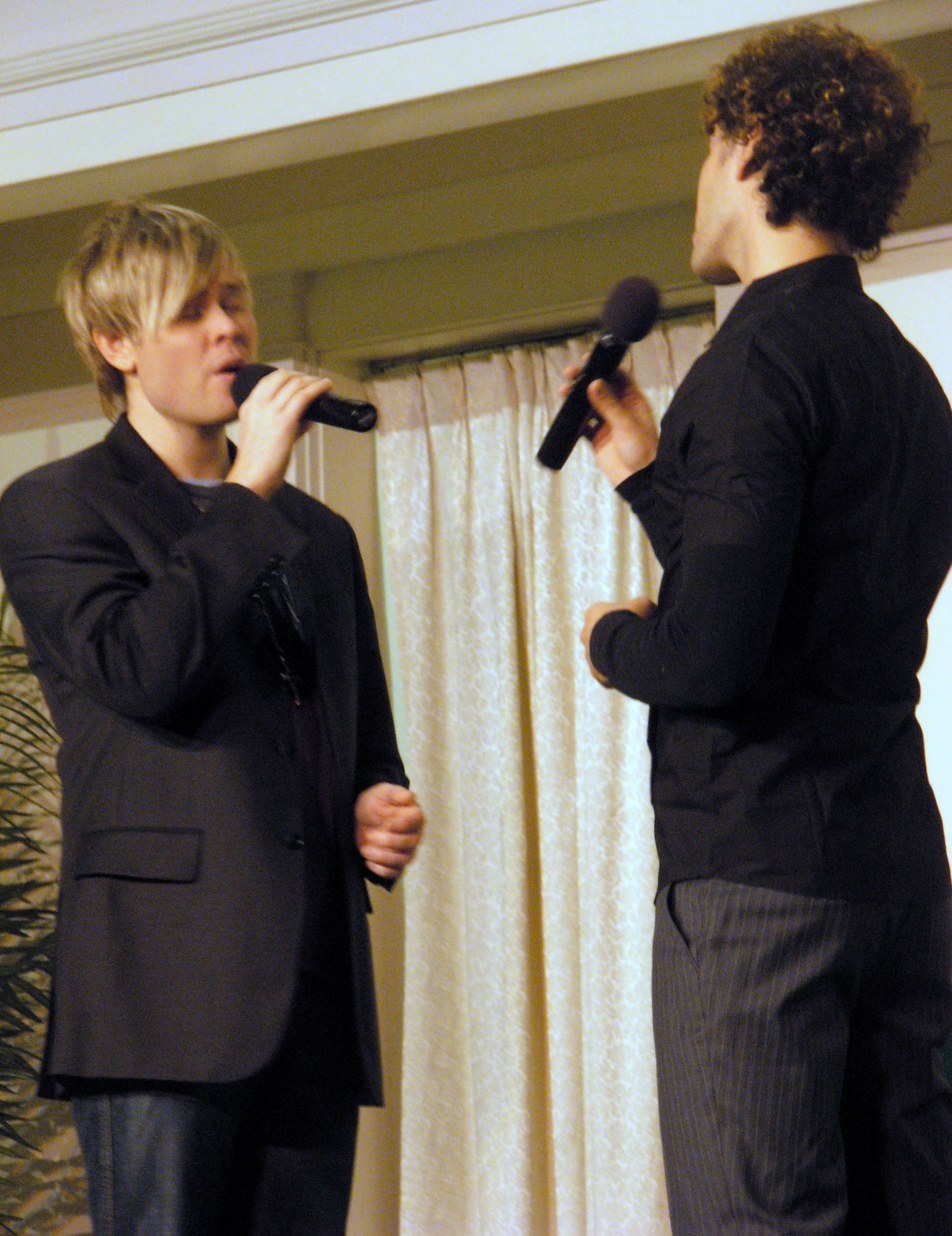
- Jason Warner and deMarco DeCiccio in 2008

Background information
- Origin: Hollywood, California U.S.
- Genres: Contemporary Christian, pop, rock
- Years active: 2002-present
- Labels: Centaur, Secular, The Orchard
- Website: Jason and deMarco.com

Jason Warner (born Robert Jason Nicewarner; 1975) and DeMarco DeCiccio (born Marco; 1976) are a Christian musical duo (and life partners) with outreach to the LGBT community.

== History ==
Robert Jason Nicewarner, who changed his name to "Jason Warner" before becoming a duo with deMarco, is a 1997 graduate of Lee University in Tennessee, and comes from a Pentecostal faith background. Marco DeCiccio, who is now known as deMarco, grew up Catholic in Canada and is a 1999 graduate of York University.

Jason and deMarco met in 2001 in Hollywood, California. Before launching their duo act, deMarco was a lead in the international touring company of the musical "California Dream Men" and Jason was a Christian artist in mainline traditional Gospel groups, and then a solo artist touring mostly through Metropolitan Community Church, gay-accepting churches.

The duo released their first album together, The Spirit of Christmas, in 2002 followed by 2003's Songs for the Spirit. In 2004, they appeared on the cover of The Advocate magazine with their new album Spirit Pop. In early 2005, they started working with Letthead Productions, a recording studio and production company based in Houston. They released their fourth album, Till the End of Time, produced by Alan Lett, with additional production from Joe Hogue, Eddie X and Luigie Gonzalez. Seven of the album's twelve songs are written by Jason and deMarco.

Jason and deMarco's first single, "Trying to Get to You," climbed the Billboard Charts and their second single, "This is Love", won "Music Video of the Year 2006" on MTV's LOGO. A full-length feature documentary film entitled We're All Angels premiered at NewFest 2007 (the 19th Annual New York LGBT Film Festival), and at Outfest 2007 (the 25th Los Angeles Gay and Lesbian Film Festival). They have a fan club "The Angel Club," based on the We're All Angels documentary.

In 2007, Jason joined the staff at Unity Church of Christianity in Houston, Texas under the leadership of Rev. Howard Caesar. He is a young adult and youth leader as well as a worship leader, performing with deMarco.

== Personal life ==
The couple married in Los Angeles in 2008 prior to the passage of Proposition 8.

== Discography ==
Albums

- 2002: The Spirit of Christmas
- 2003: Songs for the Spirit
- 2004: Spirit Pop
- 2006: Till the End of Time
- 2007: Halo
- 2008: Safe
- 2011: The Oneness of Praise

EPs

- 2006: Trying to Get to You: Remixes

Singles

- 2006: Trying to Get to You
- 2006: This Is Love
- 2008: Safe
- 2008: It's Okay

Solo recordings - Jason Warner

- Only a Whisper
- Mercy Said No
- In the Waiting
- Still

Solo recordings - deMarco

- Melodie
- deMarco (EP)

Video Releases

- 2007: This Is Love
- 2008: Safe
- 2009: We're All Angels
