= Silence of the Songbirds =

2007 book by Bridget Stutchbury

- Author: Bridget Stutchbury
- Genre: Non-fiction
- Publisher: HarperCollins
- Publication date: 2007
- ISBN: 978-0-8027-1609-5

Silence of the Songbirds (ISBN 978-0-8027-1609-5) is a book by bird lover and scientist Bridget Stutchbury about the rapid decline and loss of many species of songbirds. Some major threats covered include pesticides, sun-grown coffee, city lights, cowbirds, and global warming. The book was published by HarperCollins in 2007 and has 243 pages.

Kirkus Reviews published a review of the book on June 1, 2007, and compared it to Silent Spring by Rachel Carson. Stutchbury describes the link between Latin American deforestation and the loss of food for migratory birds, and the impact of large amounts of pesticides. However, deforestation is minimal for shade-grown coffee. She mentions additional threats to songbirds: light pollution, tall buildings, and wind farms. Despite the diminishing populations of songbirds in recent decades, she provides advice for their survival.

== Media ==
=== Canadian Broadcasting Corporation ===
- CBC Radio, Quirks and Quarks, April 14, 2007 (fourth topic) (archived by the Wayback Machine)
- CBC.ca - Words at Large - Author Exclusives - Excerpt: Silence of the Songbirds, by Bridget Stutchbury

=== Print media ===
- Tweet, tweet, you're dead, The Globe and Mail newspaper (archived by the Wayback Machine)
