= K. W. Michael Siu =

Canadian chemist

K. W. Michael Siu is a Canadian chemist, currently a distinguished research professor at York University. He is a Fellow of the Royal Society of Canada and Chemical Institute of Canada.
