= Will Beauchamp =

Canadian film director and producer

William Beauchamp is a Canadian filmmaker.

== Career ==
Beauchamp's directing credits include the drama Pariahs (2002), which won for Best Feature Film in the Toronto International Teen Movie Festival and garnered Beauchamp a $20,000 scholarship from Warner Brothers. His early films include the short drama Scotch and Soda (2003), the futuristic feature Little Pictures (2004), the short documentary Marianne (2004), a CBC Radio "pick" in the Hot Docs Film Festival, and Fly Away (2006), a short drama which raised funds for the Alberta Cancer Foundation. Beauchamp has produced three short films for director Jamie Cussen, The Great Fear (2006), an official selection of the Independents' Film Festival in Tampa, Florida, Rock, Paper, Scissors (2007), which screened as an official selection in Austin, Halifax, Beijing, Bucharest and Toronto and won Best Short Film at the Canadian Film Festival, and The Balcony Affair (2009), which premiered as an official selection at the Locarno International Film Festival.

Beauchamp was mentored by independent Canadian producer Camelia Frieberg and has served as a marketing representative for Warner Brothers. He holds a BFA in Film Production from York University and lives in Toronto, Ontario.

In 2007, Beauchamp and Jamie Cussen founded the independent production house Air Castle.

== Filmography ==
Year	Film	Genre
2002	Pariahs	Feature drama
2003	Scotch and Soda	Drama short
2004	Little Pictures	Feature drama
2004	Marianne	Documentary short
2006	Fly Away	Drama short
2006	The Great Fear	Drama short
2007	Rock, Paper, Scissors	Comedy short
2009	The Balcony Affair	Comedy short
2011	The Way Must Be Tried	Feature documentary
