= Signa Daum Shanks =

- Born: Saskatchewan, Canada

Academic background
- Education: B.A., University of Saskatchewan; M.A., PhD., University of Western Ontario
- Thesis: Searching for Sakitawak: place and people in Northern Saskatchewan's Ile-A La Crosse (2015)

Academic work
- Institutions: University of Ottawa

Signa A. Daum Shanks is an Indigenous Law scholar from Saskatchewan.

She teaches Torts, Indigenous governance and history. Her research is concerned with Law and Economics, and Indigenous Governance and she serves as a board member and is the Secretary of the Ontario Bar Association. She is currently a law professor at the University of Ottawa Faculty of Law.

== Education ==
Daum Shanks obtained a Honours Bachelor of Arts from the University of Saskatchewan and a Master of Arts from Western University in history. During her MA she received training in French translation as well as the eighteenth century legal system in New France. She obtained an LLB from Osgoode in 1999, and an LLM from the University of Toronto. She has a PhD in History from the Western University. Daum Shanks articled at Saskatchewan Justice and clerked at the Land Claims Court of South Africa. She participated in Osgoode’s Intensive Program in Aboriginal Lands, Resources and Governments.

== Career ==
Daum Shanks has been a faculty member at the School of Native Studies at the University of Alberta and also an instructor at Department of Native Studies, the University of Saskatchewan and at First Nations University of Canada. She was a faculty member at Osgoode Law School at York University in Toronto from 2014-2021.

She is a frequent commentator in the media on topics related to Indigenous peoples in North American, writing on diverse topics such as reconciliation pipelines and Indigenous rights, and the use of Indigenous images in sports.

In February 2021, Daum Shanks was appointed to the Independent Advisory Board for Supreme Court of Canada Judicial Appointments.

== Publications ==
- Daum Shanks, Signa AK (2003). "Reflections on Treaty-Making in British Columbia" (PDF). Toronto [Ont.]: University of Toronto (Canada).
