= Jean-Gabriel Castel =

French-Canadian law professor (1928–2023)

Jean-Gabriel Castel OC OOnt KC FRSC (17 September 1928 – 30 December 2023) was a French and Canadian law professor and Distinguished Research Professor Emeritus at Osgoode Hall Law School at York University in Toronto.

== Biography ==
Born in Nice, France, he served in the French Resistance during World War II receiving military decorations for his service. After the war, he received two law degrees in Paris. He was one of the first foreign Fulbright scholars. He received a J.D. in 1953 from the University of Michigan and a D. Juris. in 1958 from Harvard University.

From 1954 to 1959, he taught at the Faculty of Law of McGill University, where he served as the first Faculty Advisor to the McGill Law Journal. In 1959, he moved to Osgoode Hall Law School and taught there until his retirement in 1999. From 1957 to 1984, he was editor-in-chief of the Canadian Bar Review.

Castel was the author of Canadian Conflict of Laws, the leading Canadian work on the conflict of laws.

In 1985, he was made an Officer of the Order of Canada in recognition of being "known around the world as an authority on the subject of private international law". He was a Fellow of the Royal Society of Canada and a member of the Order of Ontario. He was an officer of the Légion d’Honneur and officer de Ordre national du Mérite.

Castel died in Toronto, Ontario on 30 December 2023, at the age of 95.
