= Fastweb (website) =

Online scholarship matching and college search service

Fastweb.com
- Available in: English
- Headquarters: United States
- Owner: Valnet
- Founder: Larry Organ
- Website: www.fastweb.com
- Launched: May 1995; 31 years ago
- Current status: Active

Fastweb is an American scholarship search website that matches students to relevant scholarships. Listing over 1.5 million scholarship opportunities, its name is an acronym for "financial aid search through the web".

== History ==
Founded in May 1995 by Larry Organ, the website was bought six years later by TMP Worldwide, which added it to its Monster.com division. When Monster and CareerBuilder merged in September 2024, funds managed by Apollo Global Management became the majority owner of Fastweb.

On June 24, 2025, CareerBuilder + Monster filed for Chapter 11 bankruptcy protection in an effort to facilitate a sale of its job board operations to JobGet. The company listed assets between $50 million and $100 million, and liabilities between $100 million and $500 million.

Also in 2025, it was announced that the Canadian media company Valnet had completed the acquisition of the American website.
