= Gavin MacKenzie =

Canadian lawyer

61st Treasurer of the Law Society of Upper Canada
- In office 2006–2008
- Preceded by: Clayton Ruby (interim treasurer)
- Succeeded by: Derry Millar

Gavin MacKenzie is a Canadian lawyer and former Treasurer of the Law Society of Upper Canada. He works as a lawyer and partner at MacKenzie Barristers, a boutique litigation firm in Toronto, Ontario that he co-founded with his daughter, Brooke. MacKenzie's practice focuses primarily on civil appeals and professional liability litigation.

== Early life ==
MacKenzie grew up in Woodstock, Ontario. He attended the University of Western Ontario, studying journalism and political science, and graduated with a Bachelor of Arts. degree in 1972. He graduated from Osgoode Hall Law School in 1975.

== Legal career ==
MacKenzie was called to the Bar of Ontario in 1977.

MacKenzie has worked for a variety of large firms in Toronto, practising civil litigation. In 1993, he published Lawyers and Ethics: Professional Responsibility and Discipline. He has written columns for The Law Times ("The Profession") and the Canadian Bar Association's National Magazine ("Conduct Becoming"). He has also taught at Osgoode Hall Law School as an adjunct professor, teaching legal ethics and professional responsibility.

MacKenzie was an elected bencher of the Law Society from 1995 to 2008. He has also been honoured by induction as a Fellow for the American College of Trial Lawyers. He has served as chair of the Ontario Law Association's Library Co. Inc., and has chaired the Law Society's Professional Regulation Committee and Strategic Planning Committee. In February, 2006, he was elected Treasurer, the highest position in the society, which he held until June, 2008. He presented a third option to address the issue of articling as a requirement to become a lawyer in Ontario.

== Awards and honours ==
In 2010, MacKenzie was awarded an honorary Doctor of Laws degree from the Law Society of Upper Canada.
