= Ping Wang (engineer) =

Canadian engineer

Academic background
- Education: BSc, 1994, MSc, 1997, Huazhong University of Science and Technology; PhD, 2008, University of Waterloo

Academic work
- Institutions: York University; Nanyang Technological University
- Website: www.eecs.yorku.ca/~pingw/

Ping Wang is a Chinese-Canadian electrical engineer. She holds a Tier 2 York University Research Chair in AI Empowered Next generation Communication Networks. In 2022, Wang was named a Fellow of the Institute of Electrical and Electronics Engineers (IEEE) for her contributions to radio resource allocation and performance modeling of heterogeneous wireless networks.

== Early life and education ==
Wang earned her Bachelor of Science and Master of Science degrees at Huazhong University of Science and Technology before enrolling at the University of Waterloo for her PhD.

== Career ==
Upon receiving her PhD in 2008, Wang worked at Nanyang Technological University in Singapore. She remained there until 2018, when she joined York University's Lassonde School of Engineering. In 2021, Wang was appointed a Tier 2 York University Research Chair in AI Empowered Next generation Communication Networks. She was also one of 18 York University faculty members recognized as the world's top researchers in their fields. The following year, Wang was named a Fellow of the Institute of Electrical and Electronics Engineers (IEEE) for her contributions to radio resource allocation and performance modeling of heterogeneous wireless networks. In 2024, Wang received the Lassonde School of Engineering's Innovation Award for her "efforts to shape the future of artificial intelligence-powered, next-generation communication networks."
