= Martin J. Steinbach =

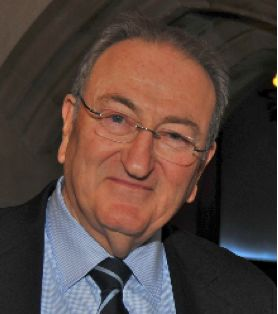
- Born: October 23, 1941; New York City, New York, U.S.
- Died: June 24, 2017 (aged 75); Montreal, Quebec, Canada
- Occupation: Distinguished Research Professor Emeritus in the Department of Psychology
- Board member of: Smith Kettlewell Eye Research Institute, San Francisco

Academic background
- Education: Connecticut College (MA); Massachusetts Institute of Technology (PhD)

Martin Jeffrey Steinbach (October 23, 1941 – June 24, 2017) was an American vision researcher who spent most of his career in Canada. He was Distinguished Research Professor Emeritus in the Department of Psychology at York University. He received a master's degree from Connecticut College in 1965 and a Ph.D. from Massachusetts Institute of Technology (MIT) in 1968.

== Professional life ==
In 1968, Steinbach was hired at York University by Ian P. Howard as his first postdoctoral fellow, as a Research Associate and as a Special Lecturer. In 1970 he became an Assistant Professor and was promoted to Associate Professor in 1973. From 1981 until 2002, Steinbach served as a Professor of Psychology and Biology at Atkinson College and the Faculty of Science. He became a Distinguished Research Professor (lifetime award) in 2000. Steinbach is a founding member of the Centre for Vision Research (CVR), York University.

Steinbach was Director of Research and Promotions, Department of Ophthalmology and Vision Sciences, University of Toronto, director of the Donald K. Johnson Eye Institute (2006-2013), Senior Scientist in the Krembil Research Institute, Professor of Ophthalmology and Vision Sciences at University of Toronto and Senior Scientist in the Department of Ophthalmology The Hospital for Sick Children.

In 1988, Steinbach along with Jean Real Brunette formed the Vision Health Research Council of Canada whose mission is to unify Canadian vision research and to advocate for vision research funding. He had an important impact on eye research and vision health in Canada.

Steinbach's many awards and distinctions include: the Carl Kupfer Award, from the Association for Research in Vision and Ophthalmology, "For promoting vision research in Canada", the Chair's Award, Department of Ophthalmology and Vision Sciences, University of Toronto, Fellow of the Association for Research in Vision and Ophthalmology, and the Department of Ophthalmology and Vision Sciences' Faculty Research Day Lecture named, in perpetuity, in his honour.

Steinbach wrote a bi-monthly invited column in the Canadian Journal of Ophthalmology called Cyclops: Update on progress in vision science, from 2005 to 2017.

== Research ==
Steinbach areas of research interests included eye movements, eye muscle proprioception, spatial and motion perception, stereoscopic vision, central vision loss, and visual illusions.

His research in eye movements included owls, which is significant because, contrary to the general belief that the owl's eyes do not move, Steinbach found that they do. In humans, his studies of eye movement control included normal and pathological populations.

While studying the ocular motor function of patients treated for strabismus, Steinbach found that pre and post-surgical measures of visual direction provided insights as to the sources of information of the position of the eyes in orbit used by the brain. This information eventually led to the discovery of the Palisade Endings in humans.

In comparing the effects of the total visual deprivation from enucleation with the partial deprivation from amblyopia and normal monocular vision, his research found enhanced perception of contrast-defined stimuli and mild impairments in motion perception as a function of monocular eye enucleation. He also examined visual direction and egocentre location in enucleated and strabismic children and adults and studied the cyclops effect.

In studying the central vision loss produced by diseases such as age-related macular degeneration his research had been directed toward the design of effective techniques to measure residual visual acuity and improve reading.

Pubmed: MJ Steinbach
