= Brian Rogers (academic) =

British psychologist and academic

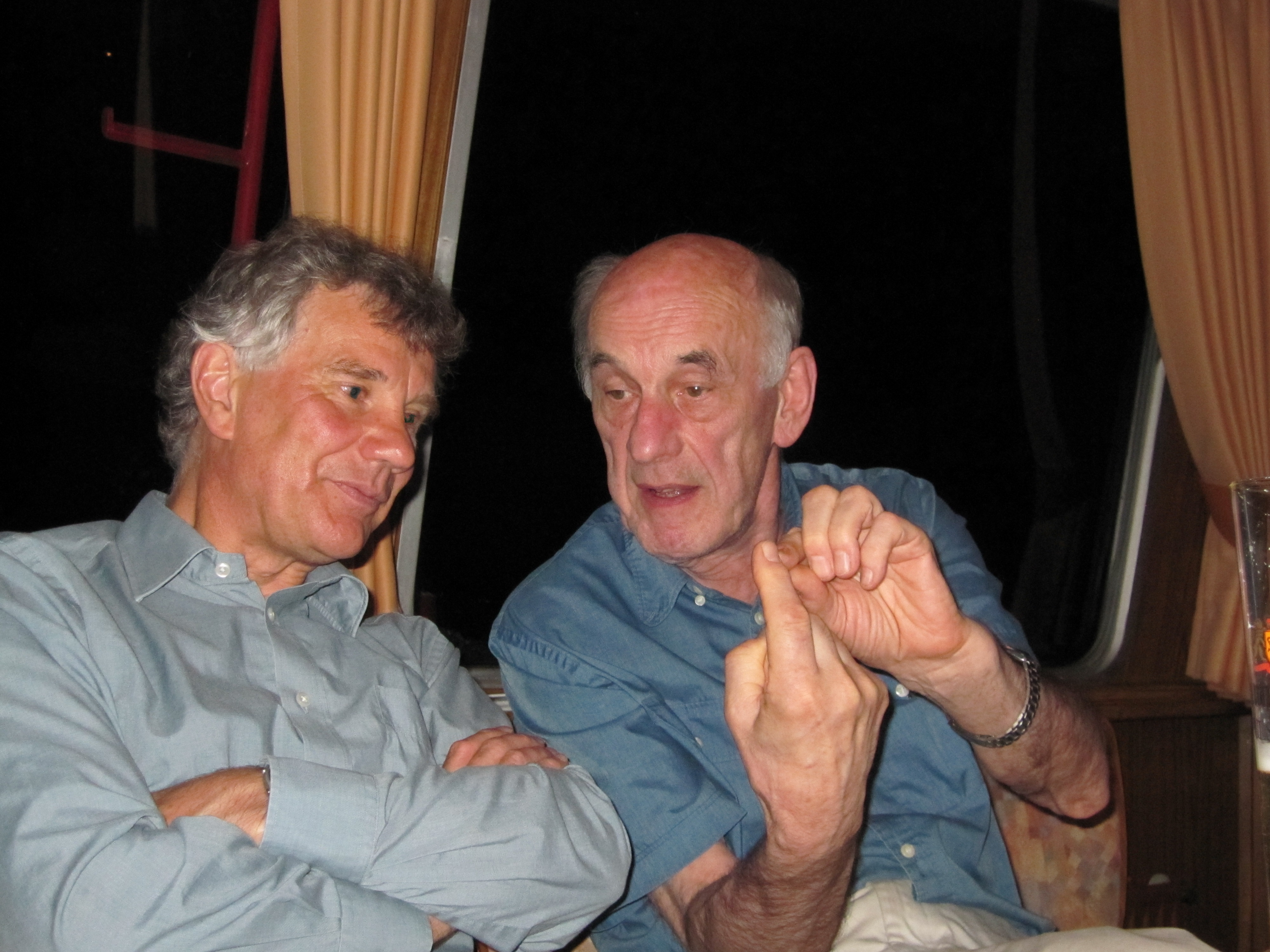
Rogers (left) with Ian P. Howard in 2009

Brian John Rogers is a British psychologist and retired academic. He was Professor of Experimental Psychology at the University of Oxford between 1996 and 2012.

== Career ==
Rogers attended the University of Bristol, graduating with BSc in psychology in 1969; he then completed a PhD there in 1976. In 1973, he was appointed to a lectureship in psychology at the University of St Andrews, where he remained until he was elected a fellow and tutor at Lady Margaret Hall, Oxford, in 1984. In 1996, he was awarded the title of Professor of Experimental Psychology by the University of Oxford. He resigned his fellowship in 1998 to raise his young son, but retained his university position. He was appointed a stipendiary lecturer at Pembroke College, Oxford in 2001 and in 2003 was elected a fellow and tutor at the college. He served as Junior Proctor in the university for the 2011–12 year and then retired in 2012.

== Research and bibliography ==
Rogers's research focuses on human visual perception. His publications include:

- (with Ian P. Howard) Binocular Vision and Stereopsis (Oxford University Press, 1995).
- (with Ian P. Howard) Seeing in Depth, vol. 2 (I. Porteous, 2002).
- (with Ian P. Howard) Perceiving in Depth, vol. 2 Oxford Psychology Series (Oxford University Press, 2012).
- Perception: A Very Short Introduction, Very Short Introduction series (Oxford University Press, 2017).
