= David A. Hood =

Canadian researcher and exercise physiologist

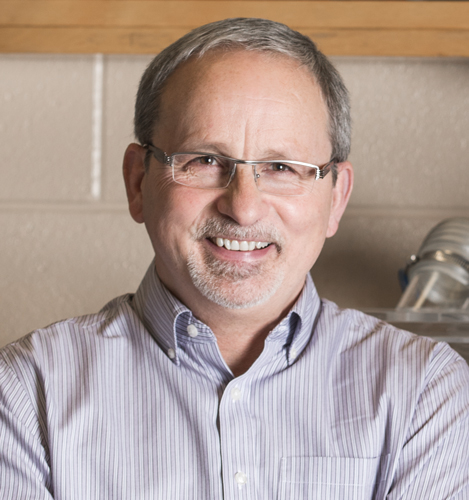
- Born: Montreal, Canada
- Occupations: Exercise physiologist, academic and researcher
- Awards: Honour Award, Canadian Society of Exercise Physiology (CSEP)

Academic background
- Education: Queen's University (BPhEd); Dalhousie University(MS); State University of New York Health Science Center at Syracuse(PhD)

David A. Hood is a Canadian professor, exercise physiologist, and Director of the Muscle Health Research Centre at York University. A holder of an NSERC Tier I Canada Research Chair in Cell Physiology, Hood is credited with making significant research advances in understanding of the biology of exercise, mitochondria and muscle health.

== Education ==
Hood attended Fisher Park High School in Ottawa. Hood received his Bachelor's degree of Physical Education from Queen’s University in 1979 and his Master's degree of Science from Dalhousie University in 1981. He defended his Ph.D. dissertation in Physiology at the State University of New York Health Science Center at Syracuse in 1986. Hood then spent two years as a Post-Doctoral Fellow at the University of Konstanz in Germany.

== Career ==
Following his postdoctoral fellowship, Hood joined York University’s School of Kinesiology and Health Science, and the Department of Biology (Faculty of Graduate Studies) as an assistant professor in 1988. Hood became an associate professor in 1992, and full professor in 1999.

Hood is the founding director, since 2009, of York University’s Muscle Health Research Centre (MHRC).

== Research ==
Hood has published over 180 full-paper academic publications in peer-reviewed journals and book chapters as well as greater than 260 abstracts with his trainees. His research program is focused on the study of "Mitochondrial Turnover in Health and Disease”, with a focus on mammalian skeletal muscle and the role of exercise and/or disuse and aging. He has used a number of in vivo and cell culture experimental models to interrogate the mechanisms of both mitochondrial synthesis (biogenesis), as well as degradation (mitophagy) in muscle. In his research, he also employs multi-disciplinary approaches involving physiological, biochemical and molecular biology techniques.

In 1987, Hood examined leucine metabolism during steady-state conditions as a function of leucine concentration and metabolic rate (VO2), and found out that leucine is metabolized by muscle but is not a major contributor to the energy cost of muscle contractions. His research also indicated that mitochondrial and nuclear gene products are coordinately regulated during adaptations to contractile activity.

In his work, Hood also provided an extensive description of mitochondrial and performance decrements during chronic muscle disuse. He was the first to determine that thyroid hormone modifies mitochondria in heart and muscle during growth and development, and repairs mitochondrial defects in diseased cells, in part via increases in protein import. He along with co-workers also discovered that contractile activity (i.e. exercise) induces calcium, AMP kinase and reactive oxygen species signaling to increase the transcription of nuclear genes, leading to mitochondrial biogenesis. He also conducted a number of studies on muscle mitochondrial biogenesis, and found out that it occurs via the increased expression of fusion, compared to fission regulatory proteins, and is accompanied by accelerated protein import into a growing mitochondrial reticulum as a result of exercise.

In a series of papers published in 2007 and 2009, Hood discussed that mitochondrially-mediated cell death (apoptosis) in muscle is increased with age and disuse, and attenuated with exercise. He was also the pioneer in providing descriptions of how p53 controls mitochondrial content and function in muscle via exercise, in part via signaling and interaction with mtDNA. His research further indicated that exercise induces lysosomal biogenesis in skeletal muscle and overcomes lysosomal impairments leading to improved mitochondrial function. Hood’s research contributed to define the role of mitochondria in terms of sending retrograde signals to the nucleus to activate gene expression in response to mitochondrial stress in muscle. He also explored the role of PGC-1α and claimed that it is not required to restore mitochondrial respiratory function as a result of exercise, but it is required for the normal exercise-induced signaling of nuclear gene expression and the induction of mitophagy.

Hood gave the first definition of a role for parkin in exercising and aging skeletal muscle, and demonstrated that exercise serves as “Mitochondrial Medicine” for muscle. Furthermore, he discovered that exercise and resveratrol synergistically increase mitochondria in muscles.

== Personal life ==
Hood and his wife have four children.
