= Marlys Edwardh =

Canadian lawyer

Marlys Anne Edwardh, CM (6 March 1950 – 14 July 2026) was a Canadian litigation and civil rights lawyer recognized for upholding the causes of justice and the rights of the wrongfully accused. She was one of the first women to practise criminal law in Canada.

== Biography ==
Edwardh was born in Lethbridge, Alberta in 1950 and graduated from Osgoode Hall Law School in 1974. She held a Master of Laws degree from the University of California, a Bachelor of Arts degree in political science from Carleton University, and an honorary Doctorate in law from the Law Society of Upper Canada. She was called to the bar in 1976.

Edwardh has been involved in numerous high-profile Canadian criminal cases:

- She fought to overturn the wrongful convictions of Donald Marshall, Guy Paul Morin and Steven Truscott.
- She represented wrongly accused Maher Arar in the commission that investigated his deportation to Syria from the United States and his subsequent torture.
- She served on royal commissions examining Canada's blood system (Krever Inquiry) and the Parker Inquiry, which investigated conflict of interest charges against former Cabinet Minister Sinclair Stevens.
- In 2000, she argued for freedom of the press on behalf of several Toronto news organizations ordered to hand over footage of police breaking up an anti-poverty protest at Queen's Park. In 2005 she led the opposition to Bill C-49 on human trafficking.

Some of Edwardh's more recent high-profile cases include representing Mahmoud Jaballah and Mohammad Zeki Mahjoub, detained under highly controversial security certificate legislation, and Ronald Smith, a death penalty case involving complicated administrative and constitutional law. Other clients include the National Post newspaper on a case waiting to be heard by the Supreme Court of Canada regarding freedom of the press and the right to protect confidential sources.

Edwardh rarely holds press conferences and is known to be generally reluctant in granting interviews. She was quoted as saying in 2002 that "a lot of the cases I take on, by their nature, generate coverage, but I draw the distinction between personal publicity, which I do not seek, and publicity for the cases I take on that I think have real importance and so attract attention."

From 1976 to 2008 she was a partner with the law firm of Ruby & Edwardh (with Clayton Ruby) in Toronto, Ontario. In 2008 she formed her own firm, Marlys Edwardh Barristers, and has since joined the partnership of Sack Goldblatt Mitchell LLP.

In 2005 she was the first recipient of the Canadian Journalists for Free Expression Vox Libera award. In 2010, she was appointed a Member of the Order of Canada.

Edwardh of cancer died on 14 July 2026, at the age of 76.
