= Deanne Williams =

Canadian author and literary scholar

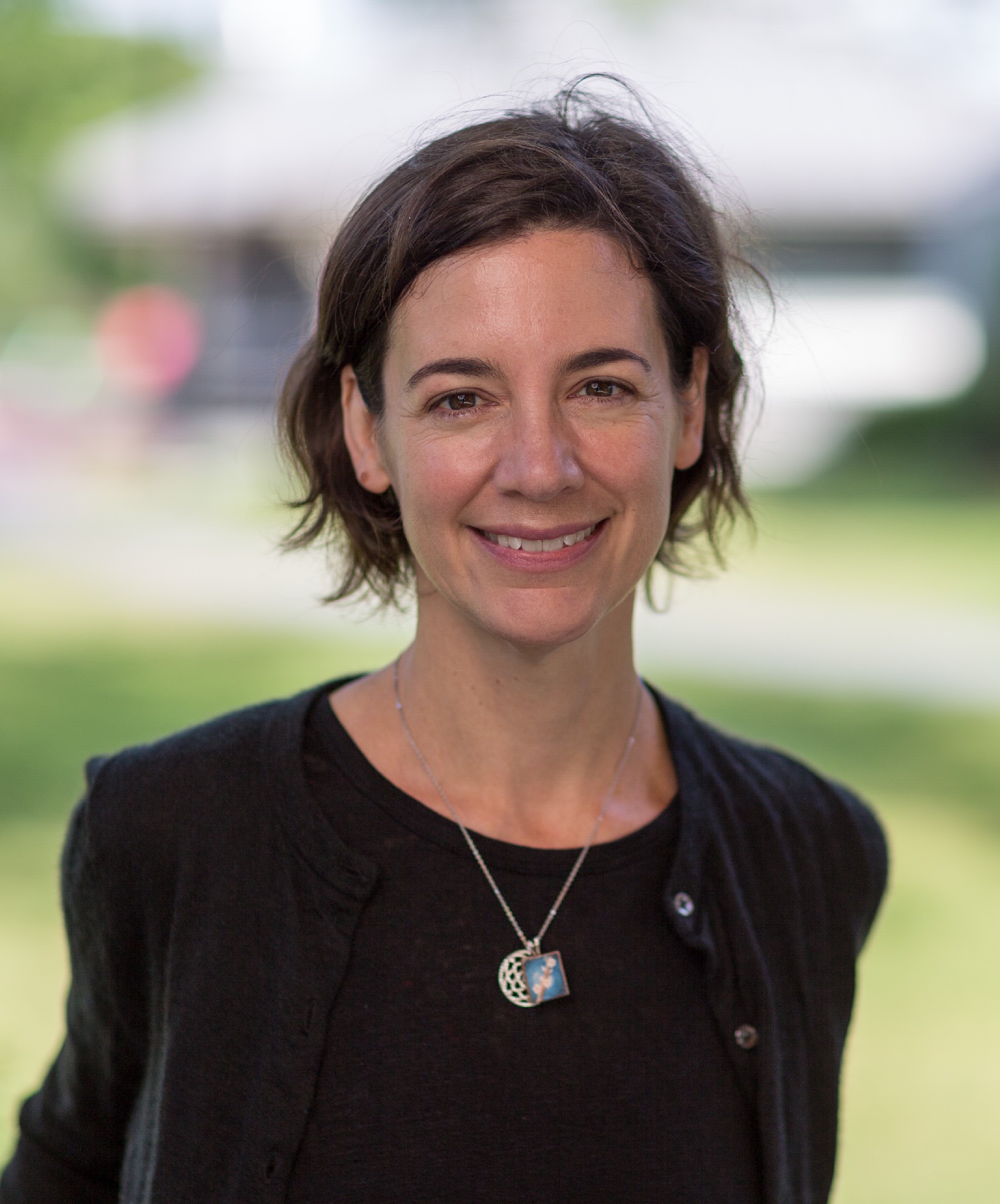
- Born: Vancouver, British Columbia, Canada
- Citizenship: Canadian
- Occupation: Professor
- Spouse: Tom Bishop

Academic background
- Education: BA, 1992, English Literature and Religious Studies, University of Toronto; MPhil, 1994, Medieval English Literature, University of Oxford; PhD, English Literature, 2000, Stanford University
- Thesis: Coming to Terms: the Trouble with French in Early Modern England (2000)
- Academic advisor: Stephen Orgel

Academic work
- Discipline: Medieval and Early Modern Literature
- Sub-discipline: Shakespeare
- Institutions: York University
- Main interests: Medieval and Early Modern Girlhood
- Notable works: The French Fetish from Chaucer to Shakespeare (2004), Shakespeare and the Performance of Girlhood (2014)
- Website: www.deannewilliams.com

Deanne Williams is a Canadian author and literary scholar. She is a professor in York University's Department of English. A pioneer in early modern Girls' studies, she has published research on Shakespeare's girl characters and girl performers in medieval and early modern England, as well as on the influence of French culture on English literature.

== Early life and education ==
Williams was born in Vancouver, British Columbia, and raised in Toronto, Ontario, where she attended the University of Toronto Schools. She received her Bachelor of Arts in English and Religious Studies from the University of Toronto, MPhil in Medieval English Studies from the University of Oxford, and PhD in English from Stanford University.

== Career ==
After earning her PhD, Williams joined the English Department at York University where she currently teaches Shakespeare and Drama. Her early research on Anglo-French literary relations won her the 2003 John Charles Polanyi Prize for literature. In 2004, she published The French Fetish from Chaucer to Shakespeare with Cambridge University Press, which was awarded the Roland H. Bainton Prize for Best Book in Literature in 2005. This book focused on England's relationship to French language, literature, and culture during the Middle Ages and Renaissance. In 2005, she published Postcolonial Approaches to the European Middle Ages: Translating Cultures with Ananya Jahanara Kabir. This co-edited volume examined the European Middle Ages through the lens of Postcolonial Studies.

Williams's current research is on medieval and early modern girlhood. In 2014, Williams published the first scholarly examination of Shakespeare's girl characters, Shakespeare and the Performance of Girlhood, with Palgrave Macmillan. In that year she was also promoted to Full Professor. In 2017, she co-edited Childhood, Education, and the Stage in Early Modern England, published with Cambridge University Press, and was elected to the College of New Scholars of the Royal Society of Canada. In 2018, Williams delivered the Alice Griffin Shakespeare Lecture at the University of Auckland. In 2018, she was awarded a Killam Research Fellowship by the Canada Council for the Arts to complete her study of the history of girl actors in early English theatre, from Middle Ages to the Restoration of the Monarchy in 1660. In 2019, she received the President's Research Excellence Award from York University. In 2023, she published her latest book, Girl Culture in the Middle Ages and Renaissance: Performance and Pedagogy, the very first study of the medieval and early modern girl actor, with Bloomsbury.

== Teaching ==
Williams is known for her experiential approach to undergraduate teaching. She ensures that students are able to attend a live performance of every play that they study in her courses on Shakespeare and Drama at York University, and gives them opportunities to speak with actors, directors, playwrights, and other theatre practitioners.
