= Susan Dion =

- Occupation: Professor

Academic work
- Discipline: Education
- Institutions: York University
- Main interests: Indigenous issues in education
- Website: Faculty profile

Susan D. Dion (Potawatomi-Lenapé) is professor at York University in the Faculty of Education. Dion specializes on issues related to Indigenous matters in education and the role of Indigenous relationships in teacher education.

Dion has expertise in both the education of teachers on issues such as reconciliation between Indigenous and non-Indigenous peoples in Canada in relation to the legacy of residential schools in Canada, and the ways these issues should be taught in primary and secondary school classrooms. She is frequently consulted as an expert on Indigenous issues in education in the news media, speaker, and in other community contexts.

Dion has collaborated with the Toronto District School Board Indigenous Education Centre on matters such as a First Nations school and a variety of curriculum initiatives. Dion worked with the Ontario Ministry of Education on the "Urban Aboriginal Education Pilot Project." Dion has particular expertise in collaborative inquiry, a methodology focused on a reflective practice. She has used this methodology in research and practical applications. The "Listening Stone" project focused on collaborative inquiry and First Nation, Métis and Inuit educational initiatives within the Ontario Ministry of Education school boards.

Dion's work with the TDSB and other initiatives on the decolonization of school curriculum has had wide impact on research and practical application of decolonization and indigenization methods within education. Her work with non-Indigenous teachers exploring blockages to incorporating Indigenous-related teaching and issues into the curriculum has also had impact.

== Selected publications ==
- Dion, Susan D.; Salamanca, Angela (2014). "inVISIBILITY: Indigenous in the City—Indigenous Artists, Indigenous Youth and the Project of Survivance". Decolonization: Indigeneity, Education & Society. 3 (1). ISSN 1929-8692.
- Dion, Susan D. (2009-05-01). Braiding Histories: Learning from Aboriginal Peoples' Experiences and Perspectives. UBC Press. ISBN 9780774858489.
