= Ruth Koleszar-Green =

Ruth Green (Mohawk) is an associate professor in the School of Social Work at York University in Toronto. She is the special advisor to the president of York University on Indigenous initiatives.

== Early life and education ==
Green is a member of the Six Nations of the Grand River. By the Mohawk matrilineal kinship system, she was born into her mother's Turtle clan of the Mohawk people, and through them is part of the Haudenosaunee Confederacy.

She earned a Bachelor of Social Work from Ryerson University, a Master of Social Work from Ryerson University, and a PhD from the Ontario Institute for Studies in Education at University of Toronto. Her dissertation is titled: Understanding Your Education: Onkwehonwe and Guests working towards Peace, Friendship and Mutual Respect. Onkwehonwe means "Original People" in Mohawk. In her thesis, Green: "explores how Guest participants have engaged with Onkwehonwe worldviews as they enroll within post-secondary courses about Onkwehonwe topics, taught by Onkwehonwe instructors/professors from Onkwehonwe perspectives."

== Career ==
Green uses the concept of Onkwehonwe in her pedagogy, including their practices of storytelling, experiential learning, and reciprocal relationship building. Green applies Onkwehonwe histories and knowledges to her research areas, which include critical social work educations, HIV/AIDS, food security, and education.

Green is a community activist and volunteers at several Toronto and Ontario Aboriginal organizations. She was a board member at Native Child and Family Services of Toronto, as well as the Indigenous Friends Association. She was instrumental in the creation of Skennen'kó:wa Gamig, or the House of Great Peace, a cabin that serves as a space for gathering Indigenous students on the York University campus. She contributed to the development and publication of York University's Indigenous Framework.

== Publications ==
- Baskin, Cyndy Ann; Guarisco, Bonnie; Koleszar-Green, Ruth; Melanson, Nadya; Osawamick, Cheryl (2009-03-12). "Struggles, strengths and solutions: Exploring food security with young Aboriginal moms". Esurio: Journal of Hunger and Poverty. 1 (1).
