= B. W. Powe =

Canadian poet, novelist, essayist, philosopher, and teacher

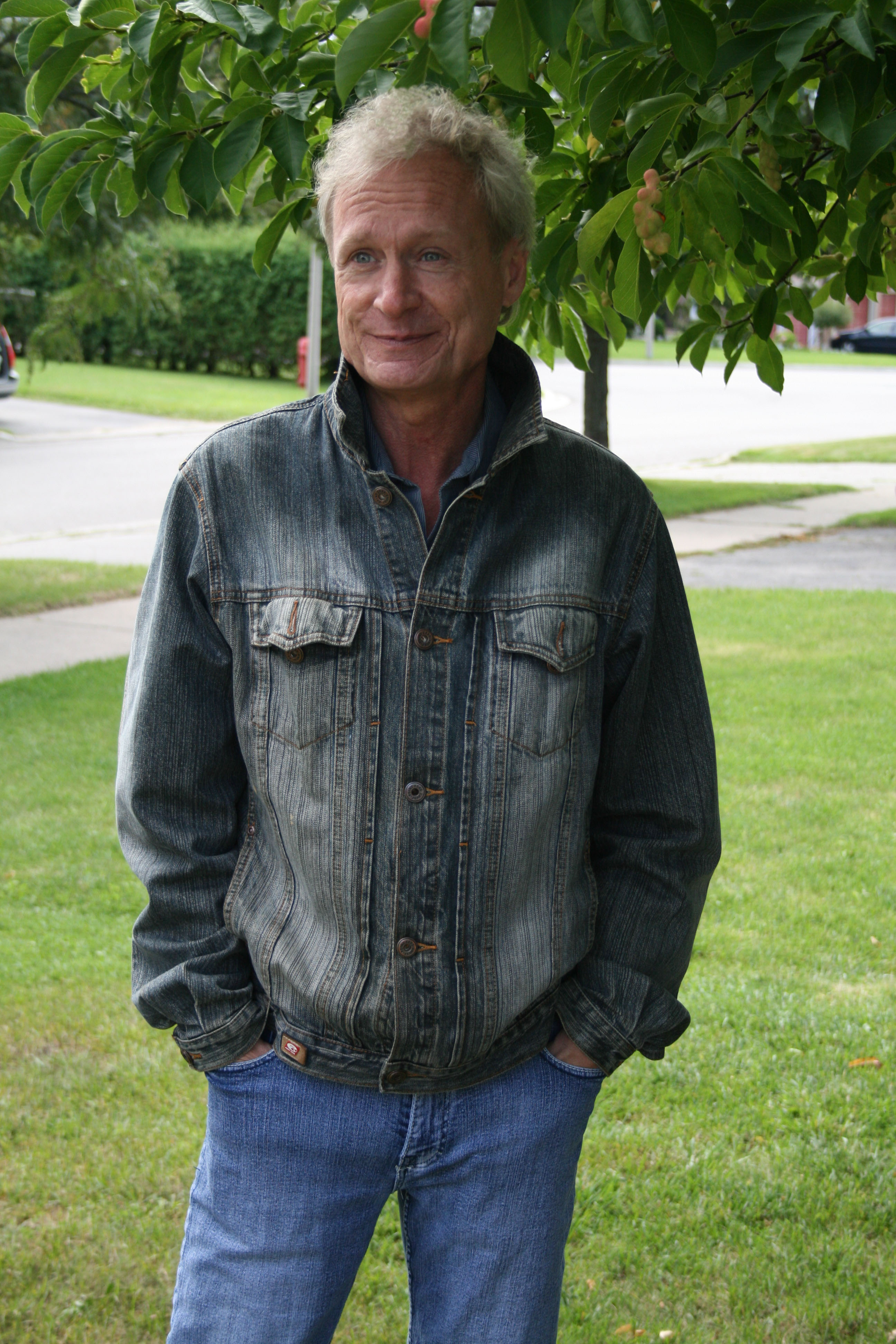
- B. W. Powe. September 2010
- Born: 23 March 1955 (age 71); Ottawa, Ontario, Canada
- Occupations: Writer--poet, novelist, essayist, philosopher; Associate Professor of Literature
- Spouse: María Auxiliadora Sánchez Ledesma
- Children: Katharine Powe; Thomas Powe, Elena Theresa Sanchez Powe
- Writing career
- Genres: Fiction, non-fiction, poetry (lyric), essay, meditations

Bruce William Powe (/paʊ/; born 23 March 1955), commonly known as B. W. Powe, is a Canadian poet, novelist, essayist, philosopher, and teacher.

== Early life and background ==
Born in Ottawa, Powe lived in Toronto from 1959 until 1996. His father is Bruce Allen Powe, author of the novels, Killing Ground, The Aberhart Summer and The Ice Eaters, among many.

He attended York University in Toronto for English studies where in 1977 graduated with a Bachelor of Arts degree. He won the prestigious Book Award at York University for the highest grades achieved in his final year. He was then awarded an also prestigious Humanities Research Council scholarship to continue his studies at the University of Toronto. Powe received a Master of Arts degree from the University of Toronto in 1981; he studied there with Marshall McLuhan, Northrop Frye, and Brian Parker. He received his PhD from York University in October 2009. His PhD is on Marshall McLuhan and Northrop Frye, their crossings in history, their agon and complementarity (their conflicts and harmonies), and the stirring alchemy of their thought. The thesis was also concerned with the role and position of these visionaries in Canada, and the role and position of guides and mentors.

His uncle is Joe Schlesinger, senior correspondent for the Canadian Broadcasting Corporation news.

On 7 June 2014, B. W. Powe was married to Maria Auxiliadora Sanchez Ledesma in Córdoba, Spain.

== Career ==
In 1995, B. W. Powe began teaching in the Department of English at York University where he taught first year introduction to literature courses as well as two additional courses entitled Visionary Literature: from Hildegard von Bingen and Dante to Bob Dylan and Joni Mitchell, and Marshall McLuhan and Northrop Frye: Two Canadian Theorists. In July 2010, Powe was promoted to associate professor of literature at York and given tenure. Powe was the program director of the Creative Writing Program at York University during the 2013-2014 semester. At York he currently teaches courses on Modernism and Post-Modernism, and divides his time between researching visionary traditions (Visionary Literature: from Dante to Bob Dylan is still offered) and continuing the McLuhan Initiative for the Study of Literacies.

== Work ==
Powe has written books of thoughts, poetry, essays, and fiction (long and short). He has also written nationally seen columns for The Globe and Mail and the Toronto Star.

He has been called "way cool" by The Globe and Mail, "one of our finest cultural commentators" by the Toronto Star, a poet who can write "hair-raising lines" that seem to come "fully formed from the cosmos" by The Globe and Mail and who takes "considerable, unfashionable risks" by The Malahat Review, "a visionary--a modern day Magellan" by the Montreal Gazette, "an intellectual terrorist" by Barbara Amiel in Maclean's, and "enigmatic...and necessary..." by the Edmonton Journal. Kenneth J. Harvey said Powe's "Heart beats against the current... [and in his work] at its ultimate core invents something original--and oftentimes breathtaking... To say brilliant would be an understatement" (Ottawa Citizen).

About his novel Outage, the Calgary Herald said: "Powe has created something remarkable...a sort of video novel, a hybrid of genres and media that transcends the ordinary and offers a new vision in a new way of a society dancing to electronically generated signals." Pico Iyer said his writings represented "a soaring alchemical vision." R. Murray Schafer called Outage "a fully realized work of art." Canadian Literature said of his poetry that "[his] subtly textured themes...affirm the importance of the romantic voice in these troubled times." The Montreal Gazette, in 2007, said that his essay prose style is "like well-chosen brush-strokes on a canvas."

At IdeaCity in 2001 Moses Znaimer called B. W. Powe's stances, public lectures and writings "a combination of poetry and rock'n'roll." In 2014, poet-critic Patricia Keeney called Powe's work "an original combination of poetry and scholarship."

Elana Wolff, poet and critic, in her book Implicate Me: Short Essays on Reading Contemporary Poems (Guernica, 2010), has this to say about Powe's writings: "a prescient writer on the cyber-age and codes and patterns...there is actually no neat genre-division in Powe's writing. ...His prose frequently reads like poetry... The Unsaid Passing is...[an] emotionally unshielded selection of pieces that range in length from five words to several sections. ...Powe wants both transpersonal and transcendent connection from poetry. ...unabashedly spiritual, and passionate...uncommon for our age. He wants us to acknowledge our capacity for deep feeling, our vulnerability and authentic need for each other, and for the sacred. ...In the poems of The Unsaid Passing, B.W. Powe goes where he has not gone in any of his previous work... and written luminous, numinous pieces of mystical and humanistic sensibility." (pp. 119–121)

His work has been profiled on CBC-TV, TVO, CITY-TV, Bravo-TV, ACCESS and CTV.

Outage was listed as one of the best ten novels of the year by Philip Marchand in the Toronto Star, in 1995/96. It was also an editor's choice novel in The Globe & Mail in 1995. His book A Tremendous Canada of Light was selected as a notable book of the year by The Globe and Mail in 1993. His book of poems, The Unsaid Passing, was shortlisted for The ReLit Prize in 2006. His novella, These Shadows Remain, was longlisted for The ReLit Prize in 2012.

Towards a Canada of Light (2006; the third revision of the Canada of Light theme) and Mystic Trudeau: The Fire and the Rose (2007) were conceived as companion pieces, part of his contemplation of the visionary possibilities of Canada and its cultural legacy. In Charles Foran's October 2007 review of Mystic Trudeau in The Walrus, he said of the book: "[it] likely makes of its subject only what Trudeau privately made of himself. Powe knew him in his final years and kept records of their conversations. Expanding on Trudeau's pithy remarks, Powe offers a reading of his character and legacy that is as challenging as many of Trudeau's own public assertions. The book is determined to credit Canada with a mystical tradition and to deliberate in that tradition's arguments, employing language that is poetic, emphatic... Wait for the book's kicker: a call for the establishment of a republic in a twenty-first Canada that has...pirouetted away from 'the last vestiges of colonialism and empire.'"

Mystic Trudeau was profiled and reviewed in an essay by Wilf Cude in The Antigonish Review (Summer 2014).

His writings have been translated into French by Derrick de Kerckhove and Michelle Tisseyre. His writings have also been translated into Czech. He has been the program director or co-director for three significant events at York University in Toronto: Marshall McLuhan: What if He Was Right? (1997), The Trudeau Era (1998) and Living Literacies (2002).

He is currently continuing to develop the McLuhan Initiative for the Study of Literacies at York University.

He read from this work at The Northrop Frye International Festival in Moncton in April 2011, and in Barcelona, Spain, at the McLuhan 100 conference, in May 2011. He spoke on Vico, Bruno, Joyce and McLuhan in Naples in June 2011. In the autumn of 2012 he was scholar/writer in residence at IN3, the University of Catalonya in Barcelona. He spoke at the University of the Basque Country in Bilbao, Spain, in October 2012.

His non-fiction study, Marshall McLuhan and Northrop Frye--Apocalypse and Alchemy, was published by the University of Toronto Press in May 2014.

He returned as Scholar/Researcher in Residence at IN3 at the University of Catalunya in Barcelona, Spain, in the spring and summer of 2013, and then returned to IN3 in the spring-summer of 2014. There he was (and still is) collaborating with Cristina de Miranda (artist and professor) and Matteo Ciastellardi (technologist and professor) on the development and production of the meta-book, multi-text, "Opening Time: On the Energy Threshold." This is an electronic work devoted to exploring new manifestations of consciousness and perception in the digital information age.

He was the Creative Writing Program Coordinator in the Department of English from July 2013 until June 2014.

In the fall of 2014, he gave well-received lectures/presentations on his book, Marshall McLuhan and Northrop Frye: Apocalypse and Alchemy, at Founders College, York University, at Victoria College at the University of Toronto, the Mercer Union in Toronto, at the Italian Cultural Centre, and at St. Michael's College (in collaboration with Professor Robert Logan).

He has other works in progress: new poems (for a book called Decoding Dust); a collection of essays, thoughts, stories, and aphorisms; a study of visionaries and of the nature of inspiration; a trilogy of novels called The Forking of the Ways. He has been at work since 2012 on a new book of poems and stories about his experiences in Spain—tentatively titled, Eternal Andalusia.

In 2014 he began an editorial-creative relationship with the Hamilton Arts and Letters (HAL) publication.

In 2015 he founded a theatre group at York University, called The Dead Tree Medium Group. The troupe consists of York University Theatre/Creative Writing students. They performed "Technogenie" from Decoding Dust at the Pages Unbound Literary Festival in Toronto in May. In 2015, he was nominated to become a member of the Royal Society of Canada (he was rejected).

Also in 2015, he was nominated for a total of six awards for his two books, Marshall McLuhan and Northrop Frye: Marshall McLuhan and Northrop Frye, and Where Seas and Fables Meet.

In the summer of 2015, he returned to be Writer-Scholar in Residence at IN3, the University of Catalunya, now in Casteldefels, Spain. In 2015 he gave lectures and readings in Barcelona, Toronto, and Ottawa.

== Bibliography ==
- 1984: "A Climate Charged" (Mosaic) ISBN 0-88962-258-2
- 1987: "The Solitary Outlaw" (Lester & Orpen Dennys) ISBN 0-88619-141-6
- 1989: "Noise of Time" in "The Glenn Gould Profile", Collections Canada, National Library Archives
- 1993: "A Tremendous Canada of Light" (Coach House) ISBN 0-88910-415-8
- 1995: "Outage: A Journey into Electric City" (Random House) ISBN 0-394-22124-9
- 1997: "The Solitary Outlaw", revised and expanded (Somerville House)ISBN 1-895897-79-3
- 1997: "A Canada of Light", revised and expanded (Somerville House) ISBN 1-895897-89-0
- 2004: "The Living Literacies Print Record", editor (Coach House) ISBN 0-9736828-0-9
- 2005: "The Unsaid Passing" (Guernica) ISBN 1-55071-209-8
- 2006: "Towards a Canada of Light", revised and expanded again (Thomas Allen) ISBN 0-88762-228-3
- 2007: "Mystic Trudeau: The Fire and The Rose" (Thomas Allen) ISBN 0-88762-281-X
- 2011: "These Shadows Remain: A Fable" (Guernica) ISBN 978-1-55071-314-5
- 2014: "Marshall McLuhan and Northrop Frye, Apocalypse and Alchemy" (The University of Toronto Press) ISBN 978-1-4426-4811-1
- 2014: Two Poems, "Reader" and "Technogenie" in "The Medium is the Muse: Channeling Marshall McLuhan", edited by Lance Strate and Adeena Karasick (Neo Poiesis Press), ISBN 978-0-9855577-5-1
- 2014-15: "Opening Time: On the Energy Threshold." (IN3, University of Catalunya/York University)
- 2015: "Where Seas and Fables Meet: Parables, Aphorisms, Fragments, Thought" (Guernica) ISBN 978-1-77183-019-5
- 2016: "Decoding Dust" (Neo Poiesis Press). ISBN 978-0-9903565-8-5 Spring 2016
- 2016: "The Tigers of Perception" (Hamilton Arts and Letters: HAL/Samizdat). Autumn 2016
- 2019: "The Charge in the Global Membrane" (Neo Poiesis Press). ISBN 978-0-9975021-8-3
