= Bridget Stutchbury =

Canadian biologist

Bridget J. Stutchbury is a Canadian biologist, currently a Distinguished Research Professor and Canada Research Chair in Ecology and Conservation Biology at York University. She is the author of the book Silence of the Songbirds, finalist for the 2007 Governor General's Award for Non-fiction.

== Education and early career ==
Bridget Stutchbury earned an M.Sc. at Queen's University and a Ph.D. at Yale University before going on to complete postdoctoral and research associate work at the Smithsonian Institution.

Stutchberry discovered that hooded warbler females will initiate sexual activity outside of the pair bond. Hooded warblers, along with birds more generally, were previously believed to form clutches with a single father. Radio tracking and DNA testing have demonstrated mixed paternity offspring instead.

== Awards and recognition ==
- Shortlisted for the Governor General's Award, 2007.
- Shortlisted for the Canadian Museum of Nature Nature Inspiration Awards, 2022.

== List of works ==
=== Books ===
- Silence of the Songbirds, Walker & Co., 2007, ISBN 978-0-8027-1609-5
- The Bird Detective: Investigating the Secret Lives of Birds, HarperCollins, 2011, ISBN 978-1-55468-348-2
- The Private Lives of Birds: A Scientist Reveals the Intricacies of Avian Social Life, Walker & Co., 2011, ISBN 978-0-8027-1746-7
- Behavioral Ecology of Tropical Birds, 1st ed., Academic Press, 2000, ISBN 978-0-12-675556-5
- Behavioral Ecology of Tropical Birds, 2nd ed., Academic Press, 2022, ISBN 978-0-12-823814-1

=== Selected Journal Publications ===
- Horn, L., T. K. Remmel, B. J. M. Stutchbury. 2021. Weak evidence of carry-over effects of overwinter climate and habitat productivity on spring arrival of migratory songbirds at a northern stopover site. Ornithological Applications. https://doi.org/10.1093/ornithapp/duab012
- Albert, S., J. D. Wolfe, J. Kellerman, T. Sherry, B. J. M. Stutchbury, N. J. Bayly, A. Ruiz-Sánchez. 2020. Habitat ecology of Nearctic–Neotropical migratory landbirds on the nonbreeding grounds. Ornithological Applications. 122: https://doi.org/10.1093/condor/duaa055
- VanVliet, H., B. J. M. Stutchbury, A. E. M. Newman, and D. R. Norris. 2020. The impacts of agricultural intensification on an obligate grassland bird of North America. Agriculture, Ecosystems and Environment 106696. https://doi.org/10.1016/j.agee.2019.106696
- Eng, M. L. Bridget J.M. Stutchbury, and Christy A. Morrissey. 2019. Neonicotinoid insecticide reduces fueling and delays migration in songbirds. Science 365: 1177–1180. https://doi.org/10.1126/science.aaw9419
- Eng, M. B. J. M. Stutchbury, and C. Morrissey. 2017. Imidacloprid and chlorpyrifos insecticides impair migratory ability in a seed-eating songbird. Scientific Reports, 7: 15176 https://doi.org/10.1038/s41598-017-15446-x
- Stutchbury B. J. M, R. Siddiqui, K. Fraser K. 2016. Ecological causes and consequences of intra-tropical migration in long-distance migratory birds. Invited paper. American Naturalist 188, S28–S40 https://www.jstor.org/stable/26519254
