= Clayton Ruby =

Canadian lawyer and activist (1942–2022)

Clayton Ruby CM

60th Treasurer of the Law Society of Upper Canada
- In office 2006–2006
- Preceded by: George Douglas Hunter
- Succeeded by: Gavin MacKenzie

Personal details
- Born: Clayton Charles Ruby; 6 February 1942 Toronto, Ontario, Canada
- Died: 2 August 2022 (aged 80)
- Resting place: Mount Pleasant Cemetery, Toronto
- Spouse: Harriet Sachs
- Children: 2
- Education: York University; University of Toronto; University of California at Berkeley
- Occupation: Lawyer

Clayton Charles Ruby CM (6 February 1942 – 2 August 2022) was a Canadian lawyer and activist, specializing in constitutional and criminal law and civil rights.

== Early life and education ==
Ruby was born in Toronto, Ontario, to Marie (Bochner) and Toronto property developer and publisher Louis W. Ruby. Ruby received a Bachelor of Arts degree from York University in 1963. He earned a Bachelor of Laws degree from the University of Toronto in 1969, and was called to the bar in 1969.

In 1971, Ruby was the defence counsel for Brian Dodge, one of the prisoners charged with kidnaping for taking six prison guards hostage during the Kingston Penitentiary riot. Ruby told the courtroom in his defence of his client on 17 August 1971: "The motive was different from the ordinary run-of-the-mill event. It was not for profit or for escape, but to try to better the prison system they lived in". Later in 1971, Ruby was one of the defence counsel at the trial of the "Kingston 13" charged with a torture-murder session during the Kingston Penitentiary riot again defending Dodge. About the secret meetings chaired by Justice William Henderson that ended the trial with plea bargains for the accused, Ruby told the media: "I'm rather amazed that anyone should find what occurred at the Kingston trial to be in any way improper or unusual". In 1973, he earned a Master of Laws from the University of California, Berkeley.

== Career ==
From 1976 to 2008 Ruby was a partner with the law firm of Ruby & Edwardh with Marlys Edwardh. After 2007, he was a partner with the law firm of Ruby Shiller Chan Hasan in Toronto, Ontario.

In 1991, Ruby was part of the legal team used by the Church of Scientology to defend itself and nine of its members who were on trial for stealing documents concerning Scientology from the Ontario Ministry of the Attorney General, the Canadian Mental Health Association, two police forces and other institutions. The case stemmed from a surprise raid of the Church of Scientology's Toronto headquarters in 1983 by more than a hundred policemen who seized an estimated 250,000 documents over the course of two days. Legal maneuvers used by Ruby delayed the case for many years and he later unsuccessfully attempted to get the case dismissed because of "unreasonable delay." On 25 June 1992, seven church members were convicted for operations against the Ontario Provincial Police, the Ontario Ministry of the Attorney General and the Royal Canadian Mounted Police (RCMP). The Church of Scientology itself was convicted on two counts of breach of the public trust (infiltration of the offices of the Ontario Provincial Police and the Ontario Ministry of the Attorney General) and was ordered to pay a $250,000 fine.

In 2006, Ruby was made a Member of the Order of Canada.

In late 2005, Ruby became the acting Treasurer, or elected head, of the Law Society of Upper Canada, the body responsible for regulating Ontario's legal profession. On 23 February 2006, however, Ruby was defeated in a special election and ceased to be Treasurer.

In 2012, Ruby represented a plaintiff who attempted to oust Mayor Rob Ford of Toronto in a high-profile conflict of interest case, which the plaintiff and Ruby won. The mayor subsequently launched an appeal. On 25 January 2012, Ford won the appeal and remained in office.

In 2013, Ruby successfully argued for the former Ontario Deputy Minister of Education Ben Levin's release on $100,000 bail. Ruby told reporters "(Ben Levin) is a man who has made enormous contributions to the educational system in this province, and indeed with changes that have been copied around the world, And I intend to work very hard to see that he shall be innocent." Ben Levin was charged with one count of making child pornography, one count of counselling to commit an indictable offence, 2 counts of distributing child pornography and agreeing to, or arranging, a sexual offence against a child under 16. Levin was eventually sentenced to three years in prison on the aforementioned charges.

== Personal life ==
Clayton Ruby's father, Louis Ruby, was publisher of Flash Weekly, a crusading Toronto tabloid and scandal sheet that ran from the late 1930s until the 1970s. Ruby was married to Madam Justice Harriet Sachs of the Ontario Superior Court of Justice. They have two daughters, Emma Ruby-Sachs and Kate J. Best (née Ruby-Sachs). Ruby died August 2, 2022, at the age of 80 from complications from heart surgery.

== Clients ==
Ruby's high-profile clients included:

- Adbusters
- The Church of Scientology
- Atif Rafay and Glen Sebastian Burns
- Abdurahman Khadr
- Svend Robinson
- Guy Paul Morin
- A group of four people challenging Ontario's Adoption Information Disclosure Act
- Faith Goldy

== Books ==
- Fogarty, Catherine (2021). Murder on the Inside The True Story of the Deadly Riot at Kingston Penitentiary. Windsor: Biblioasis. ISBN 9781771964029.
