= Deborah McGregor =

First Nations environmentalist from Ontario

- Born: Birch Island, Ontario, Canada
- Citizenship: Whitefish River First Nation and Canadian
- Spouse: Steve
- Children: 2

Academic background
- Education: BSc., University of Toronto; MES, York University; PhD., 2000, Forestry, University of Toronto
- Thesis: From exclusion to co-existence: Aboriginal participation in Ontario forest management planning. (2000)

Academic work
- Discipline: Environmental Studies
- Institutions: University of Toronto; Osgoode Hall Law School
- Main interests: Indigenous Knowledge Systems

Deborah B. McGregor (Anishinaabe) is a Canadian academic and environmentalist. She is an associate professor and Canada Research Chair in Indigenous Environmental Justice at Osgoode Hall Law School. In 2023, the University of Calgary announced that McGregor had been awarded a Canada Excellence Research Chair at their institution. The start date remains to be announced.

== Early life and education ==
An Ojibway person from Whitefish River First Nation, McGregor was born in Birch Island, Ontario, to Elder Marion McGregor. She earned her PhD in Forestry from the University of Toronto.

== Career ==
After earning her PhD, McGregor was an assistant professor in Aboriginal Studies and Geography at the University of Toronto where she also served as Interim Director of the Centre for Aboriginal Initiatives. McGregor also worked at Environment Canada-Ontario Region as a Senior Policy Advisor. In 2010, McGregor co-edited "Indigenous Peoples and Autonomy: Insights for a Global Age" with Mario Blaser, Ravi De Costa, and William D. Coleman.

McGregor was promoted to a full-time faculty member at Osgoode Hall Law School on July 1, 2015. The next year, she was renewed as a Tier 2 Canada Research Chair in Indigenous Environmental Justice, which allowed her to continue working on York's Indigenous Environmental Justice Project. Her research focus is understanding Indigenous environmental justice through a lens of unity between humanity and the environment.

In 2018, McGregor and co-editors Jean-Paul Restoule and Rochelle Johnston published Indigenous Research: Theories, Practices, and Relationships, a book exploring research methodologies centred in Indigenous worldviews. She also sat on the Assembly of First Nations Advisory Committee on Climate Action and the Environment and attended the "Reconnecting with Mother Earth" gathering with 80 Elders and youth.

Her research focuses on Indigenous knowledge systems and how they can be applied for water and environmental governance, environmental justice, forest policy and management, and sustainable development.

== Personal life ==
McGregor and her husband Steve have two sons together.

== Journal Publications ==
- From 'Trust' to 'Trustworthiness': Retheorizing dynamics of trust, distrust and water security in North America. (2022). Environment and Planning E. Nature and Space. http://dx.doi.org/10.1177/25148486221101459
- Exposing the myths of household water insecurity in the global north: A critical review. (2020). Wiley Interdisciplinary Reviews: Water 7 (6). http://dx.doi.org/10.1002/wat2.1486
- Including Indigenous Knowledge Systems in Environmental Assessment: Restructuring the Process. (2019). Global Environmental Politics 19 (3), 120-132. http://dx/doi.org/10.1162/glep_a_00519
- Mino-Mnaamodzawin: Achieving Indigenous Environmental Justice in Canada. (2018). Environment and Society 9 (1). https://doi.org./10.3167/ares.2018.090102
- Reconciliation and environmental justice. (2018). Journal of Global Ethics 14 (2). http://dx.doi.org/10.1080/17449626.2018.1507005
- Shifting the Framework of Canadian Water Governance through Indigenous Research Methods: Acknowledging the Past with an Eye on the Future. (2018). Water 10 (1), 49. http://dx.doi.org/10.3390/w10010049
- Source Water Protection Planning for Ontario First Nations Communities: Case Studies Identifying Challenges and Outcomes. (2017). Water 9 (7), 50. http://dx.doi.org/10.3390/w9070550
- Recommendations for marine herring policy change in Canada: Aligning with Indigenous legal and inherent rights. (2016). Marine Policy 74. http://dx.doi.org/10.1016/j.marpol.2016.09.007
- Traditional Ecological Knowledge: An Anishinaabe Woman's Perspective. (2005). Atlantis 29 (2). https://journals.msvu.ca./index.php/atlantis/article/view/1057
- Coming Full Circle: Indigenous Knowledge, Environment, and Our Future. (2004). American Indian Quarterly 28 (3/4), 385-410. https://jstor.org/stable/4138924

== Books ==
- Indigenous Research: Theories, Practices, and Relationships (Canadian Scholars' Press, 2018). ISBN 9781773380858
- Indigenous Peoples and Autonomy: Insights for a Global Change (UBC Press, 2011). ISBN 9780774817936

== Contributions to books ==
- "COVID-19 and First Nations' Responses," In Vulnerable: The Law, Policy and Ethics of COVID-19 (University of Ottawa Press, 2020).
- "Truth Be Told: Redefining Relationships through Indigenous Research," In Renewing Relationships: Indigenous Peoples and Canada (Indigenous Law Centre, 2019).
- "All Our Relations : climate change storytellers," in Rising tides : reflections for climate changing times (Caitlin Press, 2019).
