= Natasha Myers =

American anthropologist

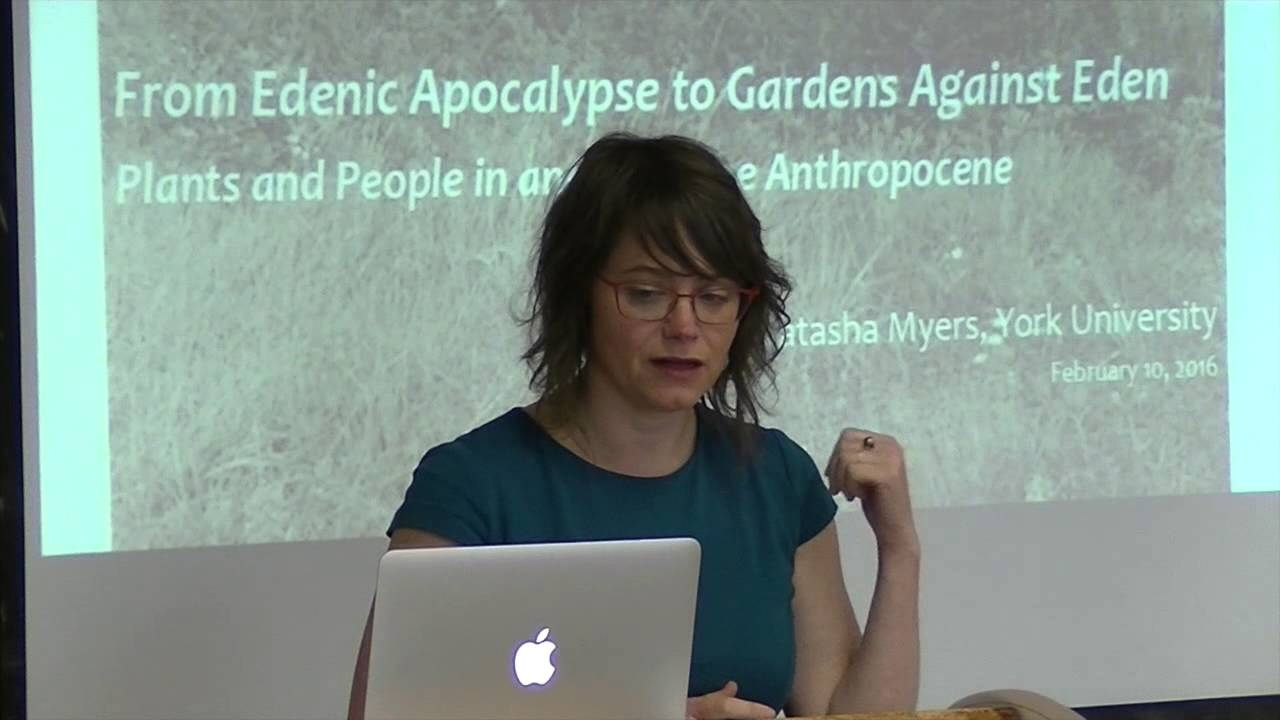
- Natasha Myers
- Born: 1974 (age 51–52)
- Occupations: professor, anthropologist, science and technology studies scholar

Academic background
- Education: McGill University, York University, MIT

Academic work
- Discipline: social and cultural anthropology, science and technology studies
- Notable works: Rendering Life Molecular
- Notable ideas: Planthropocene

Natasha Myers is an associate professor of anthropology at York University, Canada. In 2016 she coined the term "Planthroposcene". She uses this word to describe a vision of the future focussed on the relationship between plants and people.

She received her BSc in biology from McGill University, a Masters in Environmental Studies from York University's Faculty of Environmental Studies and her PhD in the Program in History, Anthropology, and Science, Technology & Society (HASTS) at the Massachusetts Institute of Technology.

Her first book, Rendering Life Molecular: Models, Modelers, and Excitable Matter is an ethnography of protein crystallographers and discusses how scientists teach one another how to sense the molecular realm. This book won the 2016 Robert Merton Book Prize from the Science, Knowledge, and Technology Section of the American Sociological Association.

She also co-edited Reactivating Elements in 2022.

In late 2026, her h-index is 23.
