= Whitefish River First Nation =

Anishinabek reserve in Ontario, Canada

Whitefish River
- Band No. 230
- Adikamegoshii-ziibiing
- People: Ojibwe
- Treaty: Robinson Treaties
- Province: Ontario

Land
- Main reserve: Whitefish River 4
- Land area: 64.23 km^{2} (24.80 sq mi)

Population (2025)
- On reserve: 420
- On other land: 34
- Off reserve: 1206
- Total population: 1660

Government
- Chief: Rodney Alexander Nahwegahbow
- Council: 2023-2027: Talon Maheengun Chin-McGregor; Brian Arthur McGregor; Jeffrey Terrance McGregor; Leslie Florence McGregor; Leona Nahwegahbow; Esther Marie Osche; Richard Michael Shawanda

Tribal Council
- United Chiefs and Councils of Manitoulin

Website
- www.whitefishriver.ca

Whitefish River First Nation (Ojibwe: Adikamegoshii-ziibiing) is an Ojibwe First Nation in Manitoulin District, Ontario. It is a member of the United Chiefs and Councils of Manitoulin. Its reserve is located at Whitefish River 4.

The reserve is one of the few subdivisions of Manitoulin District that is not on Manitoulin Island or its surrounding islands. This mainland peninsula also serves as a corridor for Ontario Highway 6 and the only bridge to Manitoulin Island.

In June 2023 during National Indigenous Peoples Day, the first monument to Missing and Murdered Indigenous Women east of Winnipeg was erected outside the reserve's community centre. It was designed by Indigenous artists from Orillia, Ontario-based Signature Memorials and was jointly-funded by the federal and Ontario governments.

== Notable members ==
- Deborah McGregor, environmentalist, educator
