= Clearbrook Human Service Agency =

Non-profit organization in Illinois, US

Clearbrook Human Service Agency is a non-profit organization located in Arlington Heights, Illinois. It was originally established in 1955 in Rolling Meadows, Illinois, with initial funding coming from families and Kimball Hill, (which is now one of the country's largest privately held land developers). Clearbrook lists its mission as "being a leader in creating innovative opportunities, services and supports to individuals with developmental disabilities".

It is one of the largest charities (as defined by operating budget) in Chicago. The agency is led by Jessica Smart, its president.

== History ==
Clearbrook began in 1955 in Rolling Meadows, Illinois, when a group of parents began meeting with the goal of establishing a school for their developmentally disabled children. In 1956, the Rolling Meadows Community School for Retarded Children Council opened its doors in a rehabilitated barn. In 1961, a permanent facility was established.

In 1965, Clearbrook began the Clearbrook Vocational Rehabilitation Center to assist developmentally disabled individuals in job training.

In 1973, Clearbrook opened its first residential program for adults in Arlington Heights, Illinois. This marked a shift toward human services as public schools began to offer classes aimed towards the developmentally disabled. The first such feature was an abandoned warehouse in Wheeling known as "The Pink Barn". This conversion allowed for 10 individuals with developmental disabilities to thrive in the community.

Today Clearbrook runs over 70 facilities and performs a variety of functions that include home-based services, residential services, and workshops that are scattered through the Chicagoland area.

== Accreditation ==
The agency is an officially listed 501 (c)(3) with the U.S. Department of the Treasury. Clearbrook is accredited by the Commission on Accreditation of Rehabilitation Facilities (CARF); NISH; the Illinois Department of Human Services; the Illinois Department of Public Health; and the Illinois Office of Rehabilitation Services.
