= George Butterfield (businessman) =

Canadian businessperson

George D.B. Butterfield
- Born: February 5, 1939 (age 86); Saint John, New Brunswick
- Education: Trinity College, Toronto; Osgoode Hall Law School
- Awards: Order of Canada

George D.B. Butterfield OC (born February 5, 1939) is a Canadian businessperson and philanthropist.

Born in Saint John, New Brunswick and raised in Bermuda, he received a Bachelor of Arts degree from the Trinity College, Toronto in 1961 and a Bachelor of Law from Osgoode Hall Law School in 1965. During his final year at the University of Toronto, he was elected president of the Kappa Alpha Literary Society. A Bermuda citizen as well, he was elected a Rhodes Scholar in Bermuda in 1963 but resigned.

Starting his career as a lawyer, along with his wife Martha and her brother Sidney Robinson, he co-founded Butterfield & Robinson in 1966, to offer biking trips for students around Europe. Today, it operates biking, walking, and boating trips in more than two dozen countries. By 2009, the company employed 40 full-time staff and 150 guides. Butterfield retired from the day-to-day operations of Butterfield & Robinson in 2009.

A philanthropist, he has worked with the Ontario College of Art and Design as the chairperson of its capital campaign which raised forty million dollars. The OCAD presented him with an honorary doctorate in 2007. He was also involved with PEN Canada, Canadian Paraplegic Association, and the World Wildlife Fund Canada.

In 2006, he was made an Officer of the Order of Canada.
