= Think tanks based in Canada =

This article is a list of notable think tanks based in Canada.

Think Tanks in Canada (Active)
Name	Focus (Note: Based on the mandate or objectives published on the organization's website, unless otherwise cited.)	Location	Website	Established (Note: Based on organization's claim unless otherwise cited.)
Aristotle Foundation For Public Policy	Civil discourse, education, and public policy in Canada	Canada	aristotlefoundation.org	2023
Asia Pacific Foundation of Canada (APF Canada)	Asia–Canada relations	Vancouver, British Columbia	www.asiapacific.ca	1984
Atlantic Provinces Economic Council	regional economy, business intelligence and recommendations	Halifax, Nova Scotia	www.atlanticeconomiccouncil.ca	1954
Academic Foundation for Peace & Conflict Studies	peace, human rights, climate change, security in academic sphere	Ottawa, Ontario	peaceconflict.ca	2016
Broadbent Institute	progressive, social democratic	Ottawa, Ontario	www.broadbentinstitute.ca	2011
Business Council of Alberta	social and economic prosperity	Calgary, Alberta	www.businesscouncilab.com	2019
Business Council of Canada (Note: The CCCE was originally known as the Business Council on National Issues (BCNI). Its name was changed to the Canadian Council of Chief Executives (CCCE). In January 2016, the CCCE was renamed the Business Council of Canada. According to a January 2016 article, members of the "40-year-old organization" are "CEOs and entrepreneurs of 150 leading Canadian companies" that "employ 1.4 million Canadians, account for more than half the value of the Toronto Stock Exchange, contribute the largest share of federal corporate taxes, and are responsible for most of Canada’s exports, corporate philanthropy, and private-sector investments in research and development.")	economic and social issues	Ottawa, Ontario	www.thebusinesscouncil.ca (formerly www.ceocouncil.ca)	The Business Council on National Issues (BCNI) was established in the 1970s.
C. D. Howe Institute	raise living standards by fostering economically sound public policies	Toronto, Ontario	www.cdhowe.org	1958
Canada 2020	progressive ideas; move and shape governments	Ottawa, Ontario	canada2020.ca	2006
Canada West Foundation	policies that shape the west	Calgary, Alberta	cwf.ca	1970
Canada's Ecofiscal Commission	carbon pricing	Montreal, Quebec	ecofiscal.ca	2014-Nov
Canadian Centre for Policy Alternatives	social, economic and environmental justice	Ottawa, Ontario; Offices across Canada	www.policyalternatives.ca	1980
Canadian Council on Social Development	shaping social and economic policy (e.g. old age security)	Kanata, Ontario	www.ccsd.ca	1920
Canadian Economics Association	advancement of economic knowledge	Montreal, Quebec	economics.ca	1967
Canadian Global Affairs Institute	defence, diplomacy, trade, resources and development	The School of Public Policy University of Calgary and Ottawa, Ontario	www.cgai.ca	2000
Canadian Institute for Advanced Research	artificial intelligence to innovation theory, the social determinants of health, and the microbiome	Toronto, Ontario	www.cifar.ca	1982
Canadian International Council	developing foreign policy initiatives for leaders around the world	Toronto, Ontario	thecic.org opencanada.org.(online magazine)	1928-01-30
Canadian Research Institute for Social Policy (University of New Brunswick)	social policy	Fredericton, New Brunswick	www.unb.ca....	1996
Canadian Tax Foundation	understanding and recommendations for the Canadian tax system	Toronto, Ontario and Montreal, Quebec	www.ctf.ca	1945
Cardus Institute	Christian institution strengthening how other institutions work together	Hamilton and Ottawa, Ontario	www.cardus.ca	1974-06-10
Centre canadien d’étude et coopération internationale (CECI)	fighting poverty, exclusion and inequality	Montréal, Quebec	www.ceci.ca blogue-volontaires.ca agirpourregalite.ca	
Centre de recherche en économie de l'Environnement, de l'Agroalimentaire, des Transports et de l'Énergie (Université Laval)	environment, energy, agri-food, transport, development of industrialized countries and emerging economies	Quebec, Quebec	www.create.ulaval.ca	
Centre d'études et de recherches internationales (CERIUM)	international issues; economy, environment and security	Montreal, Quebec	www.cerium.umontreal.ca	2004
Centre for International and Defence Policy (Queen's University)	military and defence	Kingston, Ontario	www.queensu.ca/cidp	1975
Centre for International Governance Innovation	global issues at the intersection of technology and international governance; to improve people’s lives everywhere	Waterloo, Ontario	www.cigionline.org	2001
Centre for the Study of Democracy (Queen's University)	democratic institutions, diversity (including gender, race, etc.), nationalism, land rights, international politics and democracies	Kingston, Ontario	www.queensu.ca/csdd	
Centre interuniversitaire de recherche en analyse des organisations (CIRANO)	combining knowledge and decision for the development of social and economic innovations	Montreal, Quebec	www.cirano.qc.ca	1993
Chaire Raoul-Dandurand en études stratégiques diplomatiques	contemporary political issues; international relations	Montreal, Quebec	www.dandurand.uqam.ca	1996
Chantier de l'économie sociale	collective entrepreneurship in Quebec	Montreal, Quebec	www.chantier.qc.ca	1999-April
Citizens for Public Justice	inspired by faith to act for social and environmental justice in Canadian public policy	Ottawa, Ontario	https://cpj.ca/	1963 (as Christian Action Foundation)
Clean Energy Canada	Canadian clean energy and climate policy	Offices in British Columbia and Ontario	cleanenergycanada.org	2010
Signal49 Research	economic trends, organizational performance and public policy issues	Ottawa, Ontario Calgary, Alberta		1954
The Council of Canadians	clean water, fair trade, green energy, public health care, and a vibrant democracy	Offices across Canada	www.canadians.org	1985
Council of Canadian Academies	evaluate the best available evidence on complex issues where the science may be challenging to understand, contradictory, or difficult to assemble	Ottawa, Ontario	www.scienceadvice.ca	2002
Democracy Watch	democratic reform, government accountability and corporate responsibility	Ottawa, Ontario	democracywatch.ca	1993 September
Donald J. Savoie Institute	public policy and economic development	Moncton, New Brunswick	idjs.ca	1983
Douglas–Coldwell Foundation	promoting education and research into social democracy	Ottawa, Ontario	www.douglascoldwelllayton.ca	1971
Ecology Action Centre	environmental issues	Halifax, Nova Scotia	ecologyaction.ca	1971
Equal Voice	electing more women to all levels of political office in Canada	Ottawa, Ontario	equalvoice.ca	2001
Fraser Institute	government policies, entrepreneurship, well-being of Canadians and their families	Vancouver, British Columbia; across Canada	www.fraserinstitute.org	1974-10-22
Frontier Centre for Public Policy	current affairs and public policy	Winnipeg, Manitoba	www.fcpp.org	1997
Global Risk Institute	thought leadership in risk management for the financial services sector	Toronto, Ontario	https://globalriskinstitute.org/	2011
GPI Atlantic	creating a genuine progress index for Nova Scotia	Glen Haven, Nova Scotia	www.gpiatlantic.org	1997
Institut de recherches et d'informations socio-économiques (IRIS)	Public finances, climate and environmental crisis, commodification of education and health, growth of inequalities	Montreal, Quebec	iris-recherche.qc.ca	2000
Institut du nouveau monde (INM)	Increase participation of citizens in democratic life	Montreal, Quebec	www.inm.qc.ca	2004
Institut national de la recherche scientifique (INRS)	water, earth and the environment; energy, materials and telecommunications; human, animal and environmental health; and urbanization, culture and society.	Quebec City, Quebec	www.inrs.ca	1969
Citizen First - Institute for Citizen-Centred Service	Delivery of public sector services	Toronto, Ontario	citizenfirst.ca(formerly www.iccs-isac.org)	1997
Institute for Governance of Private and Public Organizations	Corporate governance practices	Montreal, Quebec	igopp.org	2005
Institute for Peace & Diplomacy (IPD)	International affairs, defence, peace, security	Toronto, Ontario	www.peacediplomacy.org	
Institute for Research on Public Policy	Current and emerging policy issues facing Canadians and their governments	Montreal, Quebec	www.irpp.org	1972-04-19
Institute of Health Economics	Health economics, outcomes, and policy research	Edmonton, Alberta	www.ihe.ca	1995
Institute of Intergovernmental Relations (Queen's University)	Federalism and intergovernmental relations in the global environment	Kingston, Ontario	www.queensu.ca/iigr/	
Institute of Parliamentary and Political Law	Democracy and democratic governing	Ottawa, Ontario	www.parlpol.ca/institute	2009-02-26
Institute of Public Administration of Canada (IPAC)	Excellence in Public administration	Toronto, Ontario	www.ipac.ca	1967-01-01
Institute on Governance	Governance in the public sphere both in Canada and internationally	Ottawa and Toronto, Ontario	iog.ca	1996-01-18
International Development Research Centre	Climate-resilient food systems; global health; education and science; democratic and inclusive governance; and sustainable inclusive economies	Ottawa, Ontario; Offices across the Globe	www.idrc.ca	1970
International Institute for Sustainable Development	International policy on sustainable development governance	Offices across regions	www.iisd.org	1990
Justice Centre for Constitutional Freedoms	Defend the constitutional freedoms of Canadians through litigation and education	Calgary, Alberta	www.jccf.ca	2010-10-04
Liu Institute for Global Issues (University of British Columbia)	Development, environment, conflict (and post-conflict) and emerging forms of politics.	Vancouver, British Columbia	www.grad.ubc.ca	1998
Macdonald-Laurier Institute	Economic and public policy issues	Ottawa, Ontario	www.macdonaldlaurier.ca	2010
Mackenzie Institute	Domestic and global security	Toronto, Ontario	www.mackenzieinstitute.com	1984
Monarchist League of Canada	Monarchist advocacy, education, research	Oakville, Ontario	www.monarchist.ca	1973-02-23
Montreal Economic Institute	Voluntary exchange, respect for property rights, entrepreneurship, social mobility and prosperity	Montreal, Quebec and Calgary, Alberta, and joint venture in Paris, France	www.iedm.org	1987-July
Munk School of Global Affairs	Globalization	Toronto, Ontario	munkschool.utoronto.ca	2000
National Citizens Coalition	Small government, low taxes, anti-union, lobbyist, conservative	Toronto, Ontario	www.nationalcitizens.ca	1967
National Institute on Ageing (Canada) (Toronto Metropolitan University)	Physical, social, psychological and financial wellness of older Canadians	Toronto, Ontario	www.niageing.ca	2016-Feb
Northern Policy Institute	Sustainable growth in Northern Ontario, including for First Nations, Métis, and Inuit	Thunder Bay, Sudbury, and Kirkland Lake, Ontario	www.northernpolicy.ca	2015-09-25
Parkland Institute (University of Alberta)	Economic, social, cultural, and political issues	Edmonton, Alberta	parklandinstitute.ca	1996
Parliamentary Centre	Democratic practices around the world, governance, gender equality and social justice	Ottawa, Ontario	www.parlcent.org	1968
Pearson Centre for Progressive Policy	Centrist and progressive public policy that combines economic success with social responsibility	Ottawa, Ontario	thepearsoncentre.ca	
Pembina Institute	Energy development and clean energy	Calgary Alberta, with offices across Canada	www.pembina.org	1985
Polaris Institute	Various global campaigns	Ottawa, Ontario and Walnut Creek, California	www.polarisinstitute.org	1997
Public Policy Forum	Open dialogue on public policy	Ottawa, Ontario	ppforum.ca	1987
SecondStreet.org	Government policy impact on everyday Canadians	Offices across Canada	www.secondstreet.org	2017-07-10
Social Research and Demonstration Corporation	Social policy research	Ottawa, Ontario Offices across Canada	www.srdc.org	1991
Regulatory Research Institute of Canada	Economy and a just society	Langdon, Alberta	www.rricanada.org	2022-10-19
The Dais	technology, education and democracy	Toronto, Ontario	https://dais.ca/about/	2015
Trillium Network for Advanced Manufacturing	Ontario's Manufacturing Ecosystem	London, Ontario	trilliummfg.ca	2015
Unisféra International Centre	Climate change, sustainability, corporate responsibility, international development and innovation	Montreal, Quebec; Offices across regions	www.unisfera.org	2002
Vanier Institute of the Family - L'institut Vanier de la famille	Wellbeing of families in Canada in all their diversities	Ottawa, Ontario	www.vanierinstitute.ca	1965
Victoria Transport Policy Institute	Transportation Planning	Victoria, British Columbia	www.vtpi.org	
Wellesley Institute	Social determinants of health	Toronto, Ontario	www.wellesleyinstitute.com	2006 (as think tank)

This table is partly based on a list of think tanks published by McGill University's Career Planning Service, and on a list by Trent University, as well as think tanks with Wikipedia articles listed in related Wikipedia categories.

- Political and economic think tanks (based on inclusion in Wikipedia category)
  - Think tanks in Canada

== Former think tanks based in Canada ==
Name	Focus	Location	Website	Period
Atlantic Institute for Market Studies (AIMS)(merged with The Fraser Institute)	Pro-business	Halifax, Nova Scotia	www.aims.ca	1994-1995 to 2019
Caledon Institute of Social Policy		Ottawa, Ontario	caledoninst.ca (former: caledon.org)	1992 to 2017
Canadian American Strategic Review			Official Site (Archived)	2001-2016
Canadian Energy Research Institute		Calgary, Alberta	www.policyschool.ca(formerly: www.ceri.ca)	
Canadian Policy Research Networks			Web Archive	
Centre facilitant la recherche et l'innovation dans les organisations (CEFRIO)		Montréal, Quebec	(www.cefrio.qc.ca )	1987-2020
Centre for Cultural Renewal			Web Archive	
Centre for Global Challenges				
Centre for the Study of Living Standards		Ottawa, Ontario	(www.csls.ca)	
Citizens Centre for Freedom and Democracy				
Couchiching Institute on Public Affairs (merged with Canadian International Council)	current issues and public policy	Toronto, Ontario	(www.couchichinginstitute.ca)	1932
DocAgora				
George Morris Centre		Guelph, Ontario	(www.georgemorris.org)	Dissolved Dec. 2014
Human Security Report Project		Vancouver, British Columbia	(www.hsrgroup.org)	February 2002 to May 2007
Institut de politiques alternatives de Montréal		Montréal, Quebec	(ipamontreal.org)	2009
Institute for Competitiveness & Prosperity		Toronto, Ontario	(www.competeprosper.ca)	2001-2019
Institute for Media, Policy and Civil Society (IMPACS)			(www.impacs.org)	
League for Social Reconstruction				
Mowat Centre		Toronto, Ontario	(www.mowatcentre.ca)	2009 to 2019-June
North-South Institute		Ottawa, Ontario	www.nsi-ins.ca	1976 to 2014
St. Lawrence Institute		Montreal, Quebec	www.stlawrenceinstitute.org	1980

== Related Initiatives ==
Name	Focus	Location	Website	Period
Canada's World	Articulate a new vision for Canada’s role in the world.	Vancouver, British Columbia	Simon Fraser University www.sfu.ca	2007-2011
LaFontaine-Baldwin Symposium			Web Archive	

== Think tanks: political poles ==
In 2014, Western University's Donald Abelson, an expert on think tanks, classified these major Canadian think tanks on the political spectrum at the request of TVO's "The Agenda". Abelson situated the Fraser Institute, C.D. Howe Institute, the Montreal Economic Institute, the Manning Foundation, the Macdonald-Laurier Institute, the Atlantic Institute for Market Studies on the right; the Institute for Research on Public Policy (IRPP), the Conference Board of Canada, the Caledon Institute, the Centre for International Governance Innovation (CIGI), and the Canadian International Council (formerly the Canadian Institute of International Affairs) in the centre, and the Canadian Centre for Policy Alternatives, the Broadbent Institute, and the Parkland Institute on the left. Clark who wrote the article, noted that the think tanks may not agree with these classifications and that the "left, right and centre paradigms" have become "an increasingly vague and even problematic way to view politics."
