= Glendon College =

Public liberal arts college in Toronto, Canada

Coordinates: 43.7275°N 79.3785°W

- Campus Glendon de l'Université York (French)
- Other name: Glendon Campus
- Motto: Alteri Sæculo (Latin); English: "For future generations"; French: «Pour les générations futures»
- Type: Public
- Established: 1966; 60 years ago
- Parent institution: York University
- Affiliations: ACUFC; CNFS; CUFO
- Principal: Marco Fiola
- Administrative staff: 225
- Undergraduates: 1,343
- Location: Toronto, Ontario, Canada
- Campus: Midtown, suburban, 34.4 ha (85 acres)
- Language: Bilingual (English & French)
Colors
Blue and gold
- Website: yorku.ca/glendon

Glendon College is a public liberal arts college in Toronto, Ontario, Canada. Formally the federated bilingual campus of York University, it is one of the school's nine colleges and 11 faculties with 100 full-time faculty members and a student population of about 2,100.

Founded as the first permanent establishment of York University, the school began academic operation under the mentorship of the University of Toronto in September 1960. Under the York University Act 1959 legislation, York was once an affiliated institution of the University of Toronto, where the first cohort of faculty and students originally utilized the Falconer Hall building (now part of the Faculty of Law) as a temporary home before relocating north of the St. George campus to Glendon Hall — an estate that was willed by Edward Rogers Wood for post-secondary purposes.

In 1962, a landlot grant was offered by the Province of Ontario to build a new university, which eventually ceased the bilateral partnership between the two schools. York University became an independent institution; however, Glendon refused to transfer to the main Keele Campus, as the University of Toronto had no interest in reacquiring or maintaining the donated Wood property. Murray G. Ross and diplomat Escott Reid, who mutually proposed a novel plan for the college to educate students for fields in civil service, governance and academia, were appointed president and principal in 1959 and 1965, respectively. In 1966, Glendon was officially inaugurated by Prime Minister Lester B. Pearson with the objective of "helping its students develop an informed and active interest in public affairs; by encouraging them to become committed to improving the community in which they live; the country of which they are citizens; and the world which they occupy."

In 2024, York reduced the number of departments at Glendon from 14 to four, and in 2025 suspended admissions to four programs.

In 2026, York University was considering moving Glendon College to the Keele Campus due to the projected $80 million cost of maintaining and upgrading the Glendon campus as well as the college's 50% decline in enrollment over the previous decade.

== Bilingualism ==
Glendon College's undergraduate curriculum emphasizes languages, communication, international affairs, and public policy. Due to this, the Government of Ontario declared Glendon the country's first "Centre of Excellence for French language and Bilingual Postsecondary Education," in collaboration with Collège Boréal. Because of Glendon's bilingual nature, the campus received partial designation as an institution offering French services under the province's French Language Services Act.

Language skill assessments are given to new students to determine the level needed to take to fulfil Glendon's second-language requirement. Students who attain higher levels can either take advanced-level language instruction in their second language, or a discipline course taught solely in their second language. In addition, a variety of non-credit classes and programmes are offered by the college to students, faculty and the general public including introductory courses in foreign languages (Arabic, Cantonese, German, Italian, Japanese, Mandarin Chinese, Persian, Portuguese, Romanian, Spanish, Tibetan); indigenous languages in Inuktitut and Ojibway; and professional development courses in English and French. Students also have the opportunity to take other language courses available through the Languages, Literature and Linguistics department at York University.

This bilingual approach to university education is said to be unique in Canada, because all students within Glendon College are required to study both English and French. Canada's other bilingual post-secondary institutions, including portions of Concordia University, Laurentian University, University of Alberta (Faculté St-Jean), and the University of Ottawa, often educate students in one language or the other. Although each one offers students the option of a fully bilingual education, Glendon is the only institution in Canada where all anglophone and francophone students are required to take at least one compulsory class in their second language, regardless of their initial ability in the language.

In December 2025, Ontario Heritage Trust unveiled a Provincial Plaque at Glendon College commemorating the 100th anniversary of Glendon Hall and recognizing its pivotal role in advancing bilingual education across Canada.

== Degrees ==
Glendon is a primarily undergraduate institution where academics are rooted in the liberal arts tradition, although the college mainly specializes in the social sciences and humanities. Glendon offers Bachelor of Arts (BA, Internatational Bachelor of Arts (iBA), Bachelor of Science (BSc), Bachelor of Education (BEd), honours and specialize honours degrees, with bilingual, single-language, and double-major options across the humanities, social sciences, and natural sciences. Glendon has a unique concurrent and consecutive Bachelor of Education (B.Ed) focused specifically on preparing teachers for French immersion, extended French and core French teaching positions in anglophone schools. Recently, Glendon initiated its first BSc/iBSc degrees in psychology and biology, a new BA/iBA degree in communications, and a business administration and international studies dual degree (BBA/iBA) in partnership with the EMLYON Business School in France.

There are also concurrent/consecutive certificate programs in a variety of fields (teaching English as an international language (D-TEIL), law and social thought, rédaction professionnelle (offered in French only), refugee and migration studies, sexuality studies, Spanish/English – English-Spanish translation, and technical and professional communication).

Since its inception in the early 1960s, Glendon has expanded to include graduate programs in French Studies (M.A.), Public and International Affairs (M.P.I.A.), Translation Studies (M.A.), and Conference Interpretation (M.C.I.). The translation and interpreting master's programs build on the college's strength in languages, while the public and international affairs degree is affiliated with the Glendon School of Public and International Affairs. Additionally, there is a doctoral degree in Francophone Studies (Ph.D.).

Students at Glendon and the Keele Campus may enroll in courses on either campus, subject to program requirements, with access to shared university resources. Students may take a free shuttle between campuses.

== Student life ==
Mirroring the campus life of small-scale American institutions like Swarthmore and Williams, Glendon has a tight-knit community within the larger student population of their sister campus. Various campus events are organized by the Glendon College Student Union/l'Association Étudiante du Collège Glendon (GCSU/AÉCG) and its membership includes all students enrolled in courses at Glendon College and elects a council to represent them. Students can join and access a number of clubs and organizations on both of the campuses. Glendon has a newspaper (Pro Tem), York University's premier and longest student-run campus publication that is published in both English and French; a campus radio station (Radio Glendon); the Grand Rassemblement de l’Éducation en Français (GREF): Glendon's French-language publishing house; and a black box theatre company, Theatre Glendon/Théâtre Glendon, in addition to similar media from York University.

Glendon is characterized by small class sizes, with an average undergraduate class size of approximately 24 students, supporting close faculty-student interaction and individualized academic advising. Other facilities exist for students, such as a student lounge, a cafeteria, campus gym memberships, workshops, IT services, and a liaison office for prospective students. The college also encourages students to utilize academic resources on both campuses. The college's proximity to Yonge and Eglinton and Downtown Toronto makes its location ideal for students who want to partake in the city's diverse array of social and cultural attractions. Glendon College is also where the first issue of the Toronto Special newspaper was published, according to the National Post. The Salon Francophone, situated in the main building, is a social resource centre and a club, which organizes multiple activities to promote the French language.

Glendon was initially planned on being a residential college where students were required to live on campus, however, over the past few decades increases in the student population outnumbered the available residential spaces. Therefore, the majority of students commute, while only around 400 students live on campus. Glendon's international profile attracts students from over 100 countries, in particular, a significant number of francophone students from across Canada (notably Quebec) and around the world, including France, Haiti, Belgium, Morocco, and Algeria. Approximately 1/3 of the student population are francophone. Additionally, Glendon has a visible hispanophone presence with more than 20% studying Spanish as a third language. The Spanish Resource Centre library at Glendon is a joint initiative between the Ministry of Education of the Government of Spain and the Hispanic studies department of York University.

== Campus ==
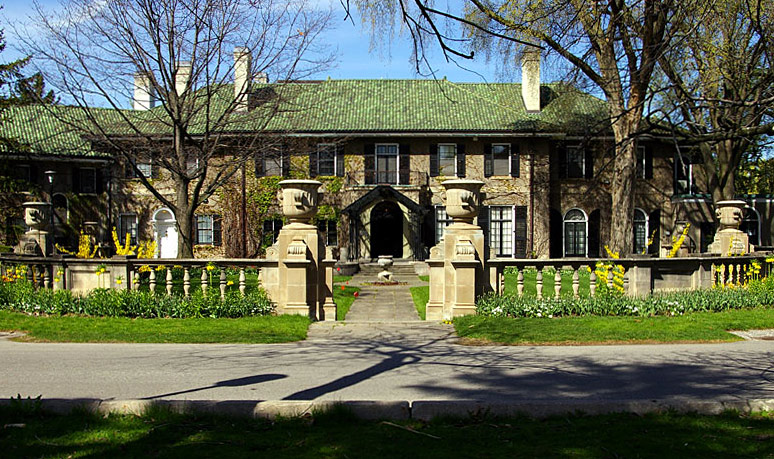
Glendon Hall

Glendon College is situated on a park-like campus in midtown Toronto and includes landscaped grounds, wooded ravines, and heritage buildings. Glendon occupies the former country estate of Edward Rogers Wood, a prominent Toronto financier and philanthropist of the early 1900s. The estate was built in 1924 and is located at the intersection of Bayview and Lawrence Ave. between the midtown neighbourhoods of Lawrence Park and Bridle Path. The estate was the original York University campus when it was bequeathed by the University of Toronto, and it remained a liberal arts college when York's Keele Campus was inaugurated in 1966. The college is formally one of York's nine colleges and eleven faculties, and it is considered semi-autonomous within York University.

Glendon's founder and first principal was Canadian diplomat Escott Reid, who foresaw the institution's key mandate to educate future leaders of Canada in both official languages. Historically, the manor served as a temporary home for the Ontario College of Art in 1952, and the Faculty of Law of the University of Toronto in 1956. Moreover, the natural landscape of the 85-acre estate was used as an arboretum by the botany and forestry department at the University of Toronto.

Currently, the college is the institutional home of the Glendon School of Public & International Affairs, the first bilingual graduate school in Canada to offer a MPIA, in collaboration with The Global Brief, Canada's top international affairs publication. The graduate school also operates an interdisciplinary research institute for public policy — the Centre for Global Challenges. The Faculty of Graduate Studies also manages a PhD program and three other distinct MA programs. The Centre of Excellence for French language and Bilingual Post-secondary Education is Glendon's recent expansion and was created to accommodate the growth of incoming students and the increasing demand for multilingual post-secondary education in Southern Ontario. The campus has also played host to several productions, namely American Psycho 2: All American Girl (2002) and The Time Traveler's Wife (2009), which were extensively filmed in and around Glendon. Often, students are incorporated into shooting when the campus is sealed off for the weekends.

In 2011, the Canadian Language Museum was established to promote an appreciation of all the languages used in Canada and their role in the development of this nation.

=== Buildings and abbreviations ===
- York Hall (YH) / Pavillon York: The main building, shaped like an 'h', divided into four sections (the main wing, and the "A", "B", and "C" wings). York Hall has two large lecture halls (one located in the Penthouse; the other in the Centre of Excellence), and houses smaller classrooms; departmental and professors' offices; the bookstore; the Rejean Garneau laboratory; the circular senate chamber; the theatre; as well as the school's cafeteria and dining hall. The renovated expansion within "B" Wing—a space enclosed with full-size glass windows housing Glendon Recruitment and Liaison, the office of the student union, dedicated club space, the Salon Francophone, as well as a spacious social common area (to replace the former Salon Garigue lounge).
- The Centre of Excellence (COE) / Le Centre d'excellence: Constructed in 2012 with a $20 million grant from the Province of Ontario, the Centre of Excellence for French language and Bilingual Education merged the existing York Hall with a sleek, glass-walled building designed by Montreal architectural firm Daoust Lestage. The Centre won a 2013 Toronto Urban Design Award.
- Glendon Hall (GH) / Manoir Glendon: Originally the Italianate villa where the Edward R. Wood family resided (his brother Frank Porter Wood lived next door, where the Crescent School is now located). Today, it has two classrooms; an all-purpose room now known as the Bank of Montreal (BMO) Conference Centre; the CKRG campus radio station; the Career and Counselling Centre; Glendon's administrative faculty offices (including that of the principal); the Canadian Language Museum; the Glendon School of Public and International Affairs; as well as the Lunik Café — a student-run cooperative that opened in September 2011. It is known informally as "The Manor."
- Leslie Frost Library (FL) / Bibliothèque Leslie Frost: Opened in 1963, the library is named after Leslie Frost, the late Premier of Ontario and graduate of Osgoode Hall Law School. With a collection of over 300,000 items, the library features a computer lab, study rooms, and quiet reading spaces available for all York University students. Adjacent to the library is the Bruce Bryden Rose Garden, a rare and well-preserved example of British landscaping, with characteristics of Victorian & Edwardian influences.
- Proctor Field House (PFH) / Pavillon Proctor: The campus athletics building houses the Glendon Athletic Club (GAC). The Glendon Athletic Club offers full gym facilities to students and the public, including a weight room, a cardio room, a pool, tennis and squash courts, an instructional studio, and a gymnasium. Proctor also holds group exercise programs such as spinning classes, yoga, martial arts, and dance lessons. In 1995, Proctor Field House served as the Toronto Raptors' practice facility.
- Hilliard Residence (HR) / Résidence Hilliard: A 215-room residence building, named after famed obstetrician Marion Hilliard. Students are divided between 6 dormitory-style houses (A, B, C, E, F, and G, respectively). With the exception of D-house, which is used for some professors' offices and classroom space, and G-house, which has suite-style rooms for upper-year students. A house can hold as many as 40 students. Each house is under the charge of a resident "don", as well as Residence Life Assistants (RLAs) that oversee activities in both residence buildings. Differing from the Wood Residence, each of Hilliard's houses do not exceed a single floor in reach, with two houses per floor. Hilliard also contains the offices of Pro Tem, the Women & Trans Centre and Theatre Glendon storage space in Hilliard's non-residential houses, D and H. The basement of Hilliard Residence contains a recreational room, available for all members of the residence.

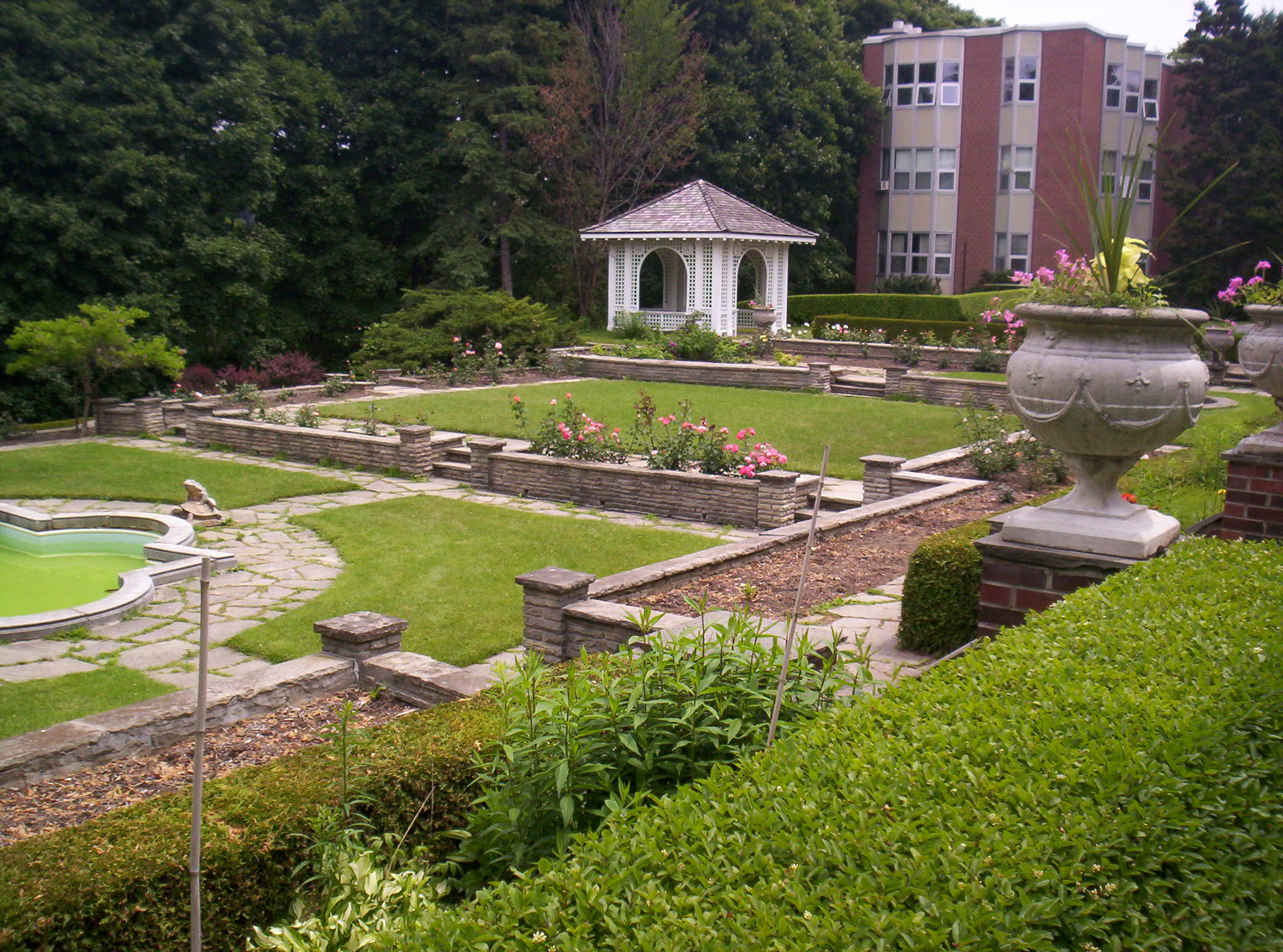
Rose Garden, with the Wood Residence visible in the background

- Wood Residence (WR) / Résidence Wood: A 189-room residence building. It houses students in typical dormitory-style rooms. Wood is the smaller of the two residences with only 22–30 students per house (section of the building). Students are divided into five houses A through E; each house spans four floors (including the basement) with a single shared common room on the ground floor. Changes in Residence Life programming have led to the creation of a "Quiet Floor" on the third floor of A House for students who wish to enjoy an extension of the regular late-night quiet hours when all residents must avoid inappropriately loud noises. As well, the entirety of C House will become "Green" for students who wish to enjoy a more environmentally friendly lifestyle within the residence.
- Greenhouse (GR) / La Serre: The Greenhouse was the Woods' old greenhouse, primarily under the care of Agnes Euphemia Smart, the widow of Mr. Wood. It is now used for the Security, Parking and Transportation Services offices, Housing and Residence services offices, as well as the campus goSAFE student escort service. Generally, students visit the Greenhouse to resolve security and campus fine issues, or for residence related issues such as keys/keycards, tax-exempt stickers for the cafeteria or any maintenance or service required in residence.

== Notable alumni ==
- Steven Bednarski, Medieval Studies professor and former television voice actor
- Marion Boyd, former politician and MPP for the New Democratic Party
- Mark Breslin, entrepreneur, comedian and co-founder of the comedy club chain Yuk Yuk's
- J. D. Carpenter, author of several suspense novels
- Kim S. Carter, Ombudsman of British Columbia
- C.F. Caunter, British motorcycle, automotive and aviation historian
- Ann Cavoukian, former Ontario Information and Privacy Commissioner
- Chloe Charles, indie singer-songwriter
- David Collenette, former Minister of National Defence, former Federal Minister of Transport
- Mike Ford, member of the popular band Moxy Früvous
- Chantal Hébert, journalist, Toronto Star political columnist
- Gordon Henderson, film producer/writer/director, directed CBC's Canada: A People's History
- Christopher Hume, notable architectural critic for the Toronto Star
- Ronald Kanter, former politician and MPP for the Liberal Party
- M. T. Kelly, novelist, winner of the Governor-General's Award for A Dream Like Mine
- Didier Leclair, novelist, Trillium Book Award and Governor-General's Award winner
- James MacKinnon, professor and head of the economics department at Queen's University
- J.R. Martin, prominent linguist and influential scholar in systemic functional linguistics
- John McNee, Canada's Ambassador to the United Nations, 2006–2011
- Stefan Molyneux, political blogger and writer
- Kate Nelligan, Academy Award-nominated film and theatre actress
- Andrew Nikiforuk, author and journalist
- Spencer Rice, actor and comedian, co-star of Kenny vs. Spenny
- Clayton Ruby, CM, Toronto lawyer, partner with Ruby & Edward
- Sara Singh, MPP and deputy leader of the Ontario NDP
- Greg Sorbara, former Ontario Minister of Finance
- Armine Yalnizyan, economist and writer

== Proposal to close the campus and relocate to Keele ==
In 2026, the Canadian media reported York University's proposal to close Glendon College and merge the existing programs and faculties to the Keele Campus given the lack of attendance at Glendon. Although there remains the challenge of preserving the Glendon Manor Museum The plan would be to replace the campus for new housing development.

Since 2025, York University started an invitation to public response on this move proposal. Radio Canada reported criticism of the move, arguing a move to the larger Keele campus could further marginalize French students. The proposed move has also sparked concerns about the risk to the current campus's heritage sites that face severe risk.

== Notable faculty ==
- Irving Abella, CM, author and historian
- Jean Burnet, professor of ethnic studies and relations, and founder of Glendon's department of sociology
- Jean-Gabriel Castel, RSC OC, lawyer, author
- Christopher Dewdney, author
- Alex Himelfarb, former Clerk of the Privy Council and Director of the Glendon School of Public and International Affairs
- John W. Holmes, OC FRSC, diplomat and professor of international relations (1971–1981)
- Michiel Horn, RSC, official historian of York University
- Michael Ondaatje, CM, novelist and poet
- Norman Penner, historian, war veteran, professor emeritus of political science (1972–1995)
- Graham Reed, author and psychologist
- Anne Russon, psychologist prominent in primates discourse and cognition
- John T. Saywell, Dean and institutor of York University's arts and sciences department
- Lorie Tarshis, economist and professor (1982-1988)
- Ellen Meiksins Wood, RSC, political scientist, Marxist historian and scholar
