= Anne E. Russon =

Canadian psychologist

Anne E. Russon is a Canadian psychologist and primatologist. She is a researcher and Professor of Psychology at Glendon College, York University, Toronto, Ontario, Canada whose research focuses on learning and intelligence in ex-captive Bornean orangutans. Russon is widely published in the fields of primate behavior and ecology, is executive director of the Borneo Orangutan Society of Canada, and is the author of several popular press books dealing with Great Apes including Orangutans: Wizards of the Rainforest, Reaching into Thought: The Minds of the Great Apes, and The Evolution of Thought: Evolution of Great Ape Intelligence.

== Early life and education ==
Russon received her doctorate at the University of Montreal, and her Masters and York University in Toronto, where she currently teaches. Before she began to study orangutans, Russon had experience working with chimpanzees in laboratory settings. It was there that she developed an interest in great ape intelligence, especially studying them outside of captivity. Since 1989, Russon has been studying Bornean orangutan intelligence.

== Career ==
=== Work with orangutans ===
Russon began to study orangutans because she felt that they had been neglected in previous research on great ape intelligence, despite growing evidence of their complexity. Her choice to study ex-captives was born out of several factors. First, the lifestyle of wild orangutans was not conducive to up-close study. Also, captive orangutans are often mistreated, and therefore emotionally or mentally damaged, making them inadequate study subjects. Ex-captives, however, could be studied closely, since they were familiar with humans, yet they were more well-functioning and healthy than those in captivity.

Russon’s work has focused on conservation efforts. She is executive director of the Borneo Orangutan Society of Canada, a charitable organization which supports orangutan conservation efforts in Indonesia and Malaysia. She is also a part of the advisory boards for other orangutan support organizations, including Alchemy Films, Borneo Orangutan Survival Foundation–Indonesia, the Orangutan Conservancy, and Orangutan Network. She also runs “Orangutan Sanctuary”, a webpage meant to provide resources for professionals interested in orangutan conservation.

=== Awards and recognition ===
During her Tenure at York, Russon has been recognized with several awards from the university. In 2017, Russon was awarded with York’s President’s Research Excellence Award, meant to recognize full-time professors at York university for their positive impact on York’s reputation, and on the university community. Russon was also awarded with the 2018 Distinguished Research Professorship for her research contributions.

== Published work ==
Russon is known for her work on primate cognition with Bornean orangutans.

In 1993, Russon published an article with co-author Birute M Galdikas, titled Imitation in free-ranging rehabilitate orangutans (Pongo pygmaeus).

In 1996, Russon edited a book titled Reaching into thought: The minds of the great apes. In this book, field and laboratory researchers show that the Great Apes are capable of thinking at symbolic levels, traditionally considered uniquely human.

In 1998, Russon published an article with coauthor Richard W. Byrne titled Learning by Imitation: A hierarchical approach.

In 1999, Russon published a nonfiction book titled Orangutans: Wizards of the Rainforest. The book included a brief history on the Orangutans, as well as current issues related to the rehabilitation of these primates. In the book, Russon detailed her experiences working with and rehabilitating ex-captive orangutans.

Russon contributed to the 2002 documentary The Disenchanted Forest.
