= Vanier College at York University =

Residential college on York University's Keele Campus

Vanier College
- York University
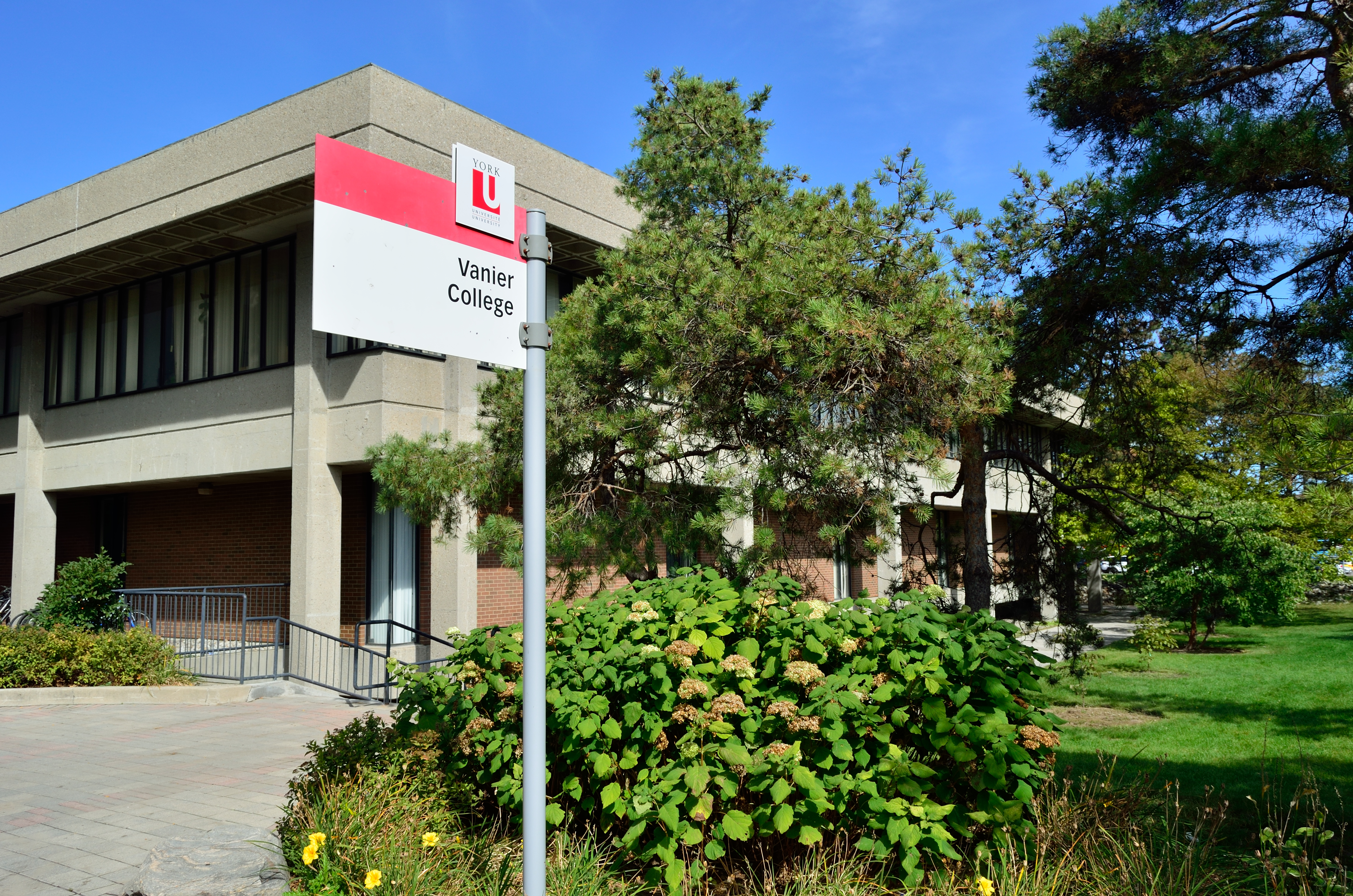
- Location: 254 Vanier College; Toronto, Ontario, Canada
- Coordinates: 43°46′31.92″N 79°30′8.09″W
- Motto: To Belong and Contribute
- Established: 1965; 61 years ago
- Colours: Blue, pink and green
- Residents: 6909
- Mascot: Panther

Vanier College, founded in 1966, is the second oldest residential college on the Keele Campus of York University. It is named after former Governor General of Canada Georges Vanier.

Vanier College is self-governed in its day-to-day activities by a master, the master’s office staff and students. Academic support is provided by an academic advisor and a team of peer advisors. Vanier Residence is managed by a residence life manager and a residence life team of dons, night porters and programmers, all of whom are upper-year students.

The mandated academic areas which Vanier College supports are: Business and Society, Business Economics, Children’s Studies, Classical Studies & Classics, Culture and Expression, Economics, Financial and Business Economics, Hellenic Studies, Humanities, Individualized Studies, Jewish Studies, Liberal Studies, Philosophy, Religious Studies, Social and Political Thought as well as all Undecided Majors in the Faculty of Liberal Arts and Professional Studies.

== The banner ==
Jack Bush, a Canadian abstract artists, designed Vanier's banner in 1971. Acrylic on canvas, the forms in this banner, which measures 101 cm x 80 cm - like most of those in his later paintings - are abstract. Bush originally studied at the Ontario College of Art in the late 1920s and had a number of solo shows throughout North America, including the Museum of Fine Arts in Boston, and the Nicholas Wilder Gallery in Los Angeles. He died in Toronto at the age of 68 in 1977.

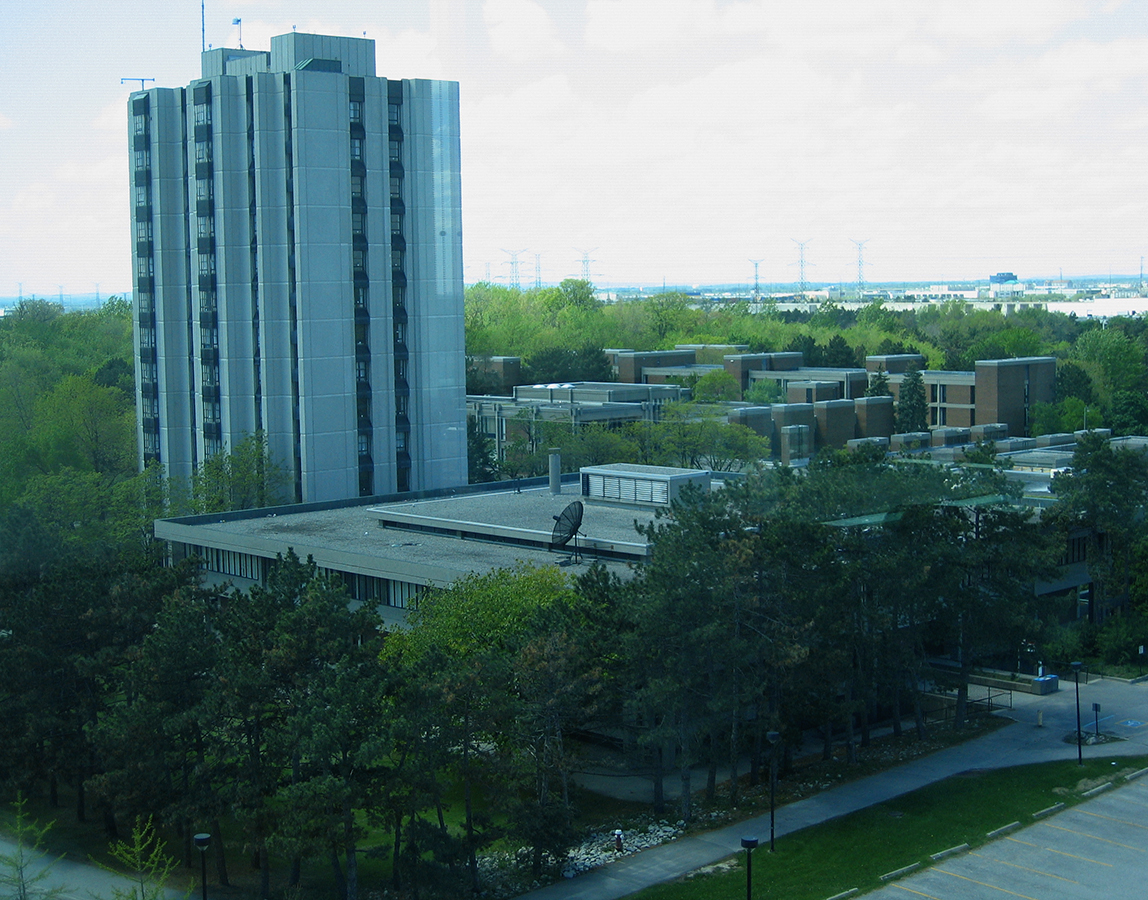
A View of Vanier College and Residence from the York Research Tower
