= Jean Burnet =

Canadian sociologist

- Born: 1920; Toronto
- Died: September 14, 2009
- Occupation(s): Glendon College, York University ethnic studies academic
- Known for: Looking Into My Sister's Eyes: An Exploration in Women's History

Jean Robertson Burnet (1920 – September 14, 2009) was a Canadian academic specializing in ethnic studies. Burnet, a specialist in Canadian ethnic relations, founded the Glendon Sociology Department at York University.

Burnet was a native of Toronto and studied for her undergraduate degree in Sociology at Victoria College, Toronto, including under Harold Innis. She received her master's degree and PhD at the University of Chicago.

She left the University of Toronto in 1967 to join York University and was the founding chair of the Glendon Department of Sociology.

== Death and legacy ==
Burnet died on September 14, 2009.

Her archival papers are held at the University of Toronto Archives and Record Management Services.
