= Aly Tadros =

American singer-songwriter (born 1986)

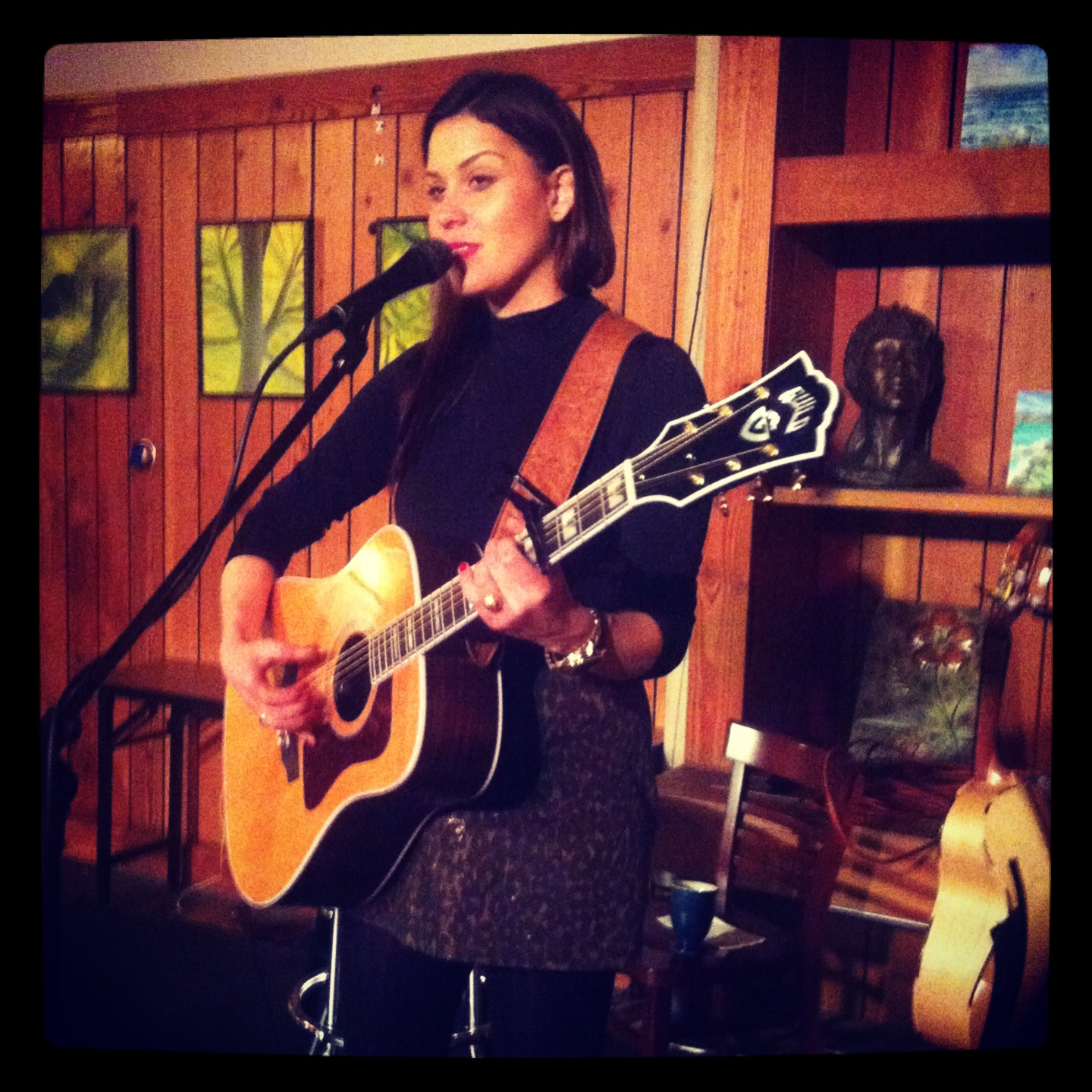
- Aly Tadros performing at the New Leaf Cafe on March 8, 2013

Background information
- Born: Alexandra Jennifer Tadros; Laredo, Texas
- Genre: Indie folk
- Occupation: Singer-songwriter
- Instruments: Singing, guitar, vihuela, ukulele
- Years active: 2009–present
- Label: Lost Ridge Records
- Website: http://www.alytadros.com

Alexandra Jennifer "Aly" Tadros (born November 1986) is an American singer-songwriter known for her self-taught finger-picking style and her fusion of folk, pop, Mexican, and Middle Eastern influences. She has performed across the United States and in France, Germany, Italy, Switzerland, and the United Kingdom.

== Biography ==
Tadros was born in Laredo, Texas. Her father is Egyptian and her mother is Texan of Irish ancestry. Tadros traveled internationally at age 17 to Turkey, Spain, and Egypt before studying Middle Eastern Studies at Sarah Lawrence. She bought a guitar at 18 and taught herself to play. At 21, she moved to San Antonio and then Austin, Texas, and began her career as a singer-songwriter.

Tadros also volunteered with Care Communities in Austin, Texas and continues to include performances at retirements centers and assisted-living homes.

In June 2018, Tadros described a brief BDSM relationship that she had been in.

== Discography ==
- Things Worth Keeping (2009)
- Live at Eddie's Attic (2011, with Chloe Charles)
- What's it like to be a sprinkler, I wonder? (2011, with The Sweetness)
- Whim (2013) Single (w/ Ben Balmer)
- The Fits (2013)
- Hungry Ghost (2016)
