= Radio Glendon =

Online radio station at Glendon College in Toronto

Coordinates: 43°43′40″N 79°22′36″W

- Toronto, Ontario; Canada

Programming
- Format: campus radio

Ownership
- Owner: Glendon College

History
- First air date: 1977
- Former frequencies: 800 kHz (1990–2005); 89.9 MHz (2005–2010)

Links
- Website: www.radio-glendon.ca

Radio Glendon is a Canadian online radio station, which broadcasts on radio-glendon.ca in Toronto, Ontario. It is the campus radio station of the city's Glendon College, a campus of York University.

Radio Glendon offers a variety of programs in both English and French, and the programming schedule features both independent and mainstream music.

The station has broadcast on a variety of platforms since its creation in 1977. Originally a cable radio outlet, it converted to AM radio in 1990, and then to FM radio in 2005, with the call sign CKRG-FM, before ceasing its conventional radio transmissions and moving exclusively online in 2010.

== Early history ==
=== First iteration: FM cable, 1977–1980 ===
CKRG broadcast on FM started with a 'cable only' license from May 23, 1977 to August 15, 1980. Alan Lysaght was the manager during this time. By January 1978 RGL had 2 new 'on-air' studios in the Glendon mansion, one of which fed the pub and Junior Common room, the other licensed studio fed a low power transmitter which covered the campus and a Rogers and Metro Cable for transmission throughout Toronto on Cable FM. In March 1979, CKRG was seeking funding for a full FM license not restricted to cable FM. In January, 1980 an article The Globe and Mail detailed some of the station's programming:

It's Mozart, followed by Elvis Costello, followed by Haitian Voodoo music, followed by contemporary music from a staggering variety of relatively unknown Canadian artists such as Array, the Canadian Contemporary Music Ensemble, the Glass Orchestra and Honey Novick. It's unknown Canadian poetry and drama, lectures, arts reviews, and live broadcasts from out of the way places like Toronto's Music Gallery....while the station is officially off the air (at night), the outside microphone (lodged on the roof of the station's home in a mansion at Glendon College) picks up the nightly warblings from the winged creatures congregating in the valley and transmits them to all who listen...

In November 1981, Pro Tem published an article entitled, "The CKRG Story", stating that funding stopped in August 1980, the station stopped broadcasting and that the station's broadcast equipment was moved out of the Glendon Hall studios for safekeeping until funding for the license could be secured. The funding never came and the equipment was donated to non-profit broadcasters. The station went off the air for a period of 5 years.

=== Second iteration: Glendon in-house radio, 1985–1990 ===
By 1985, CKRG was piped into the cafeteria and student lounge using extremely long speaker wires strung through conduit from the basement of the Glendon mansion to the physical plant building and finally connecting into ceiling loudspeakers, as well as a line in the pub also located in the basement of the Glendon mansion. For the next three years, CKRG did mostly college DJ dance events using a combination of owned and rented DJ equipment in the pub and cafeteria.

=== Third iteration: 800 AM, 1990–2005 ===
In 1989, station manager Stefan Caunter, who had started in 1985 on the staff of the station, felt that the time had come to re-acquire a license, to provide real radio transmission to Glendon using mostly existing carrier current equipment. In 1990, CKRG was given approval by the Canadian Radio-television and Telecommunications Commission (CRTC) to broadcast at AM 800 kHz with the transmitter power of 25 watts. Note that the company which was to be incorporated, Bayview Avenue Non-Profit Student Radio, was incorporated by Caunter in 1990, and was the license holder for the FM 89.9 license.

In 1991, station manager Derek Allerton began to rebuild the station and put forth a serious effort to re-acquire an FM license, to broadcast at 200 watts on 106.3 MHz, to replace the existing AM carrier-current license (the signal was transmitted through the campus electrical system, rather than through the air) the station ran on. By 1993 the Toronto radio market had become saturated, and competition for the remaining broadcast frequencies was fierce. The CRTC denied the application in 1994.

Broadcast equipment was largely obsolete and in a state of series disrepair by 1991. Allerton contacted various commercial and public radio stations in the Toronto area and requested any unused equipment be donated. Only the Canadian Broadcasting Corporation replied but was able to provide a substantial amount of equipment, including reel-to-reel machines and equipment racks.

After Allerton's exit as a manager, and throughout much of the 1990s, the station focused on broadcasting to its core audience, the students of Glendon College. One notable exception was Edward Beres, who as manager was able to expand the station's facilities to include a dedicated broadcast booth beside the student pub.

Due to the CRTC's 1994 denial, he also elected to add a second AM transmitter (on the same frequency) and moved one transmitter to each residence building.

During Ed Beres' term as a manager, he managed to recruit some very dedicated volunteers to carry on the station's day-to-day functions. New students would be attracted to the radio station, and its new and improved broadcast range into the residence buildings, cafeteria, and pub. Volunteers such as Richie Favalaro (now with major Toronto radio station CHUM-FM), Mike Glustien (now with Ottawa's CFGO) Mike Shering, David Taillefer, and Philip Godin took on the responsibilities of such tasks as the financial needs of the station, programming, music tracking, and recruiting of new student's as on-air DJs. Ed updated the broadcast equipment and made the station more accessible for student clubs to use for special event planning.

Ed's successor as a manager in 1995, Philip Godin, continued to create an accessible student radio station by promoting throughout the campus, hosting events for the new students during orientation week, and ensuring there was a regular broadcast schedule from 8 am to noon. Godin wanted to improve the infrastructure of the radio station from the ground up, to prove to the CRTC that CKRG could be capable of broadcasting on the FM frequency once again. As well as ensuring a solid broadcast schedule for students at Glendon, Godin started a co-op training program at CKRG which allowed local high schools in the area to teach students the basics in radio broadcasting. Godin also brought on Alison Smith as News Director in 1995, and later Anthony Burnett in 1996 as Assistant News Director to round out the station's executive, fleshing out a full broadcast schedule by the end of 1997.

In 1998, the station manager Brad Crowe took a decisive step in building up the radio station's listenership and purchased a 1-watt transmitter which was capable of broadcasting to the campus.

From 1998–2001, former Office Manager and transplant from CKLU in Sudbury, Ontario, Ryan LaFlamme continued Brad's work as Station Manager. Accomplishments included increasing volunteer number to over 85 undergraduate students and creating the first complete programming schedule in many years, obtaining an LPFM license, rebuilding the secondary production and interview room, finalizing the re-cataloging of the music library, and restoring the 'vinyl vault' from storage for run-down equipment. Ryan was responsible for training several of the future station executive and Station Managers, including Seth Wotten.

Beginning in 2002, the live streaming of radio broadcasts allowed much wider audiences access to the station. Student DJ's were encouraged to incorporate new technology into their broadcasts. Previously it was common to see a DJ carrying a record crate or CD suitcase for their shows, but the sight of laptops became more common. Several up-and-coming dance music DJ's also graced the broadcast booth, including a then-unknown Toronto trance DJ named Joyrider, and Jonathan Swayze, a successful electronica DJ.

=== Fourth iteration: 89.9 FM, 2005–2010 ===
In September 2004, the CRTC approved a licence for CKRG to broadcast on 89.9 FM, expiring August 31, 2011.

The station signed on in 2005. The broadcast signal ran for 5 years, but was fairly weak, with the signal often unlistenable south of St. Clair Avenue. The decision was made to discontinue the CKRG FM license in light of improved internet technology and the impending expiration of the license in 2011. The FM station went dark in 2010, although the CRTC actually renewed the FM license through 2013.

=== Current iteration: Online, 2010–present ===
The online station essentially replaced the over-the-air broadcast station and was up and running in 2010. However, it suffered much initial difficulty maintaining the quality of its online stream, and after long periods of neglect, was eventually abandoned.

After nearly a year of inactivity, Radio Glendon moved to a new website at www.radioglendon.ca in 2011, with the site's official launch party being held on October 21. The station's new website had a revamped layout, and included member and DJ profiles and schedules, and the broadcast booth was renovated. Radio Glendon began broadcasting soon after the launch party, with live shows airing from November 7, 2011 until the end of the school year in early April 2012. The station now broadcasts mainly during the school year.

Since this period, Station Managers included Stephanie Henry, now a Breakfast Television Traffic Reporter, and Simone Visentin, a programming coordinator at TLN Media Group.
