= Keele Campus of York University =

Main campus of York University in Toronto

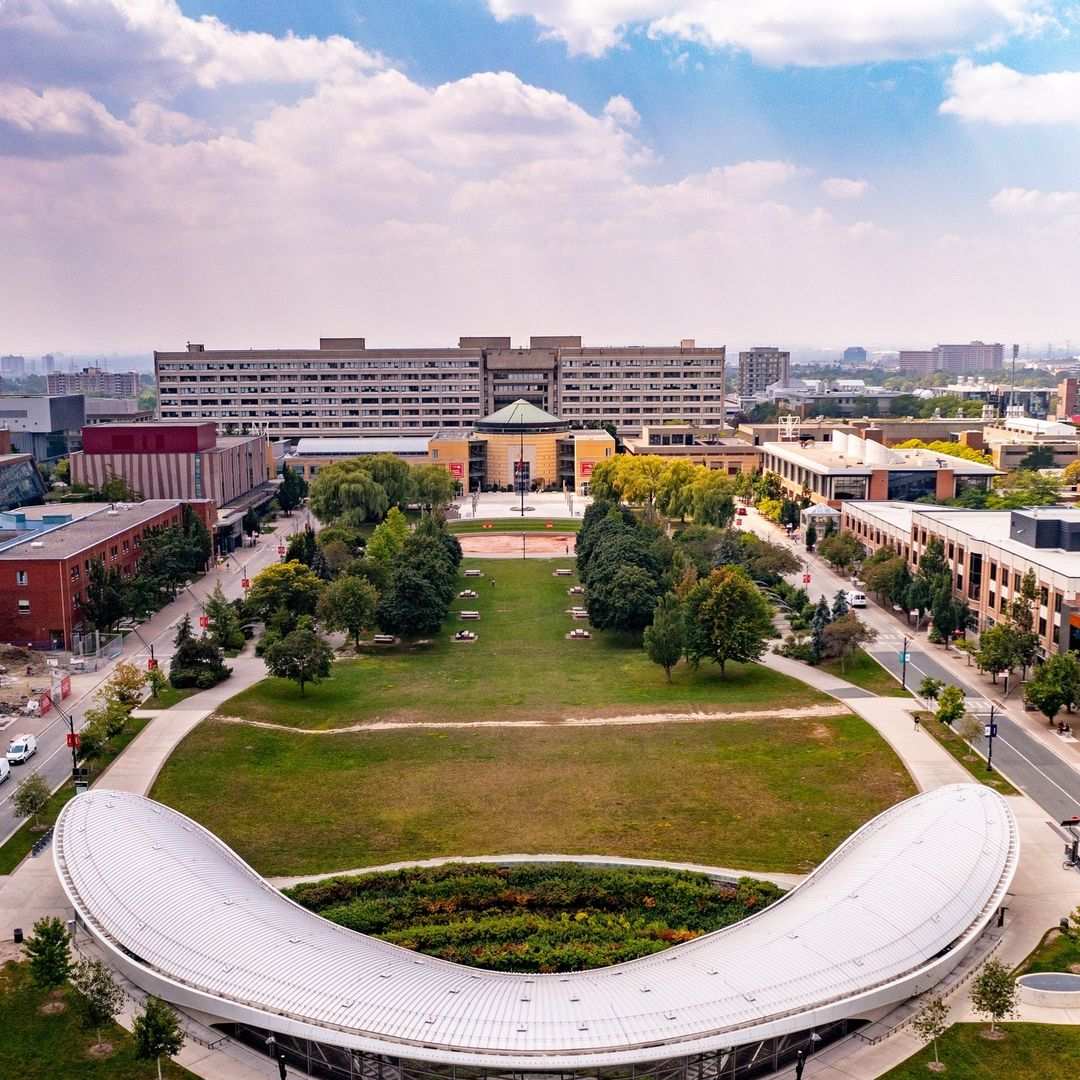
- Established: 1965; 61 years ago
- Parent institution: York University
- Location: Toronto, Ontario, Canada; 43°46′23.04″N 79°30′13.07″W
- Campus: 457 acres (185 ha); Suburban

The Keele Campus is the main campus of York University in the North York district of Toronto, Ontario, Canada. It occupies roughly 1 square kilometre of land and is situated between Jane Street to the west, Keele Street to the east, Steeles Avenue West to the north and Finch Avenue West to the south. It is the largest post-secondary campus in Canada by land area at 457 acres (185 ha).

== History ==
The campus was once occupied by farms held by pioneers of the area including:

- James Stong (Lots 22 and 25)
- Daniel Stong (Lot 25)
- Peter Erlin Kaiser (1750-1820) (Lot 24)
- Abraham Hoover (1821-1905) (Lot 23)
- John Boynton (Lot 21)

The area was named Kaiserville after the settler Peter Kaiser, who was buried in the area, while the Stongs left the area in 1951, the Hoovers' till the 1930s.

The original 1960s buildings—now designated Toronto Heritage Properties—were designed and built by joint venture UPACE (with John B. Parkin Associates, Shore and Moffat and Partners, Gordon S. Adamson and Associates) and landscape under Hideo Sasaki.

== Central Campus ==
Snow storm on central campus

The main facilities of the central part of the campus are connected by heated walkways for the safety and convenience of students and staff.

=== Vari Hall ===
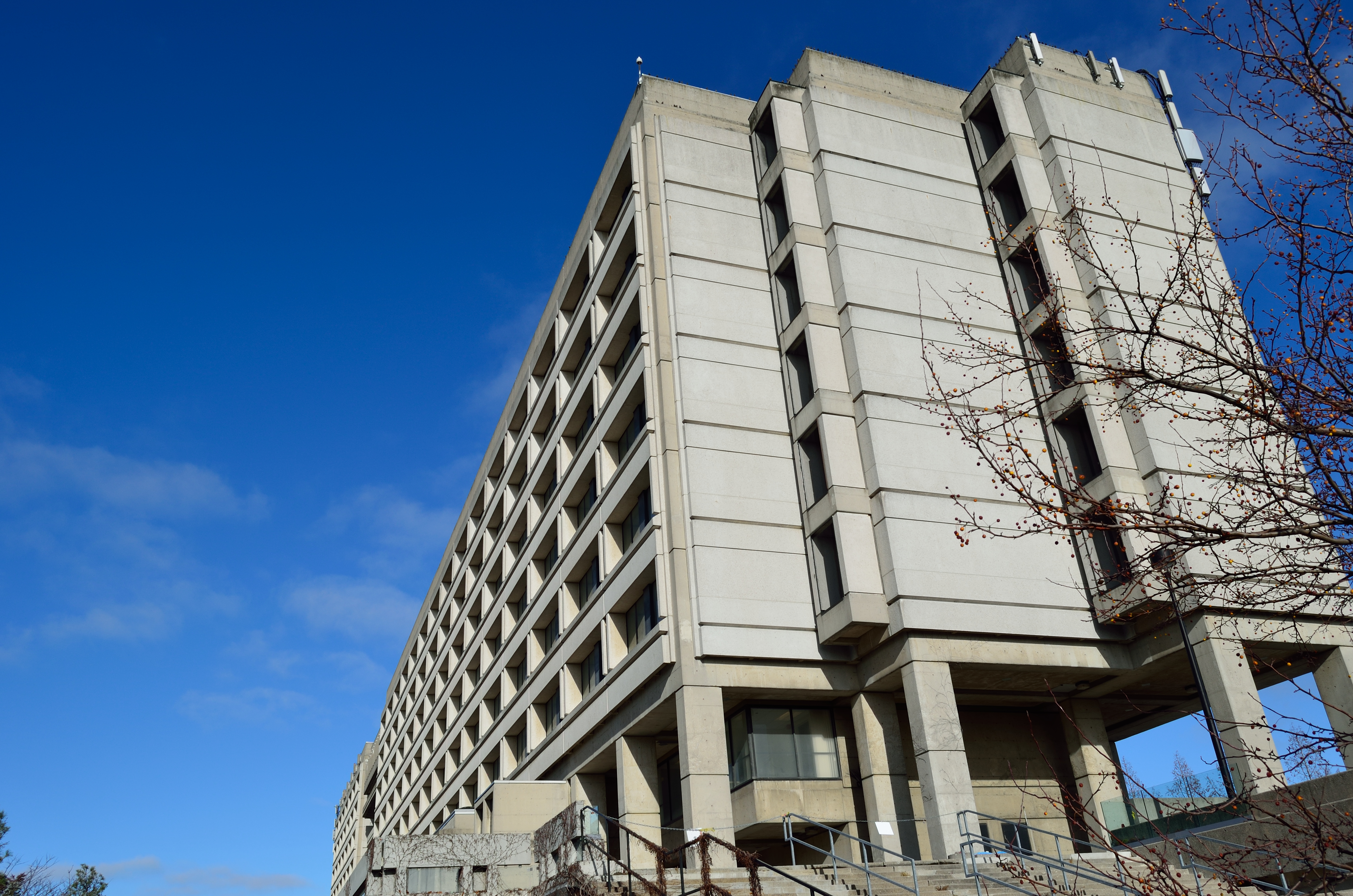
The southernmost Ross Building Tower, also known as South Ross

Vari Hall, primarily given over to lecture halls, was designed by Raymond Moriyama and constructed in the early 1990s to put a "new face" on the campus. The facility is named for George and Helen Vari, Hungarian refugees and businesspersons who helped finance the building. The three-story rotunda has become a popular place for student life and social activities.

=== Ross Humanities and Social Sciences Building ===
Most of Ross consists of faculty offices, particularly of those affiliated with Arts. It was named for Dr. Murray G. Ross (1910-2000), the university's founding president (1959 to 1970). There are several small classrooms in the lower floors of the building, as well as a small cinema. Ross also houses the Graduate Pub, one of the few places on campus licensed to sell liquor.

A ramp leading up to the Ross Building was demolished during the building of Vari Hall by 1989.

Ross is divided into two towers: Ross North, and Ross South. Room numbers must be identified with a tower prefix, as the same numbers are used. (i.e. R N403 and R S403)

=== Central Square/Curtis Lecture Halls ===
Central Square is the hub connecting Ross, the Scott Library and the Curtis Lecture Halls. It includes a large cafeteria (with a courtyard), a "bear pit", a small "open" computer laboratory, several TD ATMs, Booster Juice and several offices focused on student and faculty services.

=== Scott Library ===
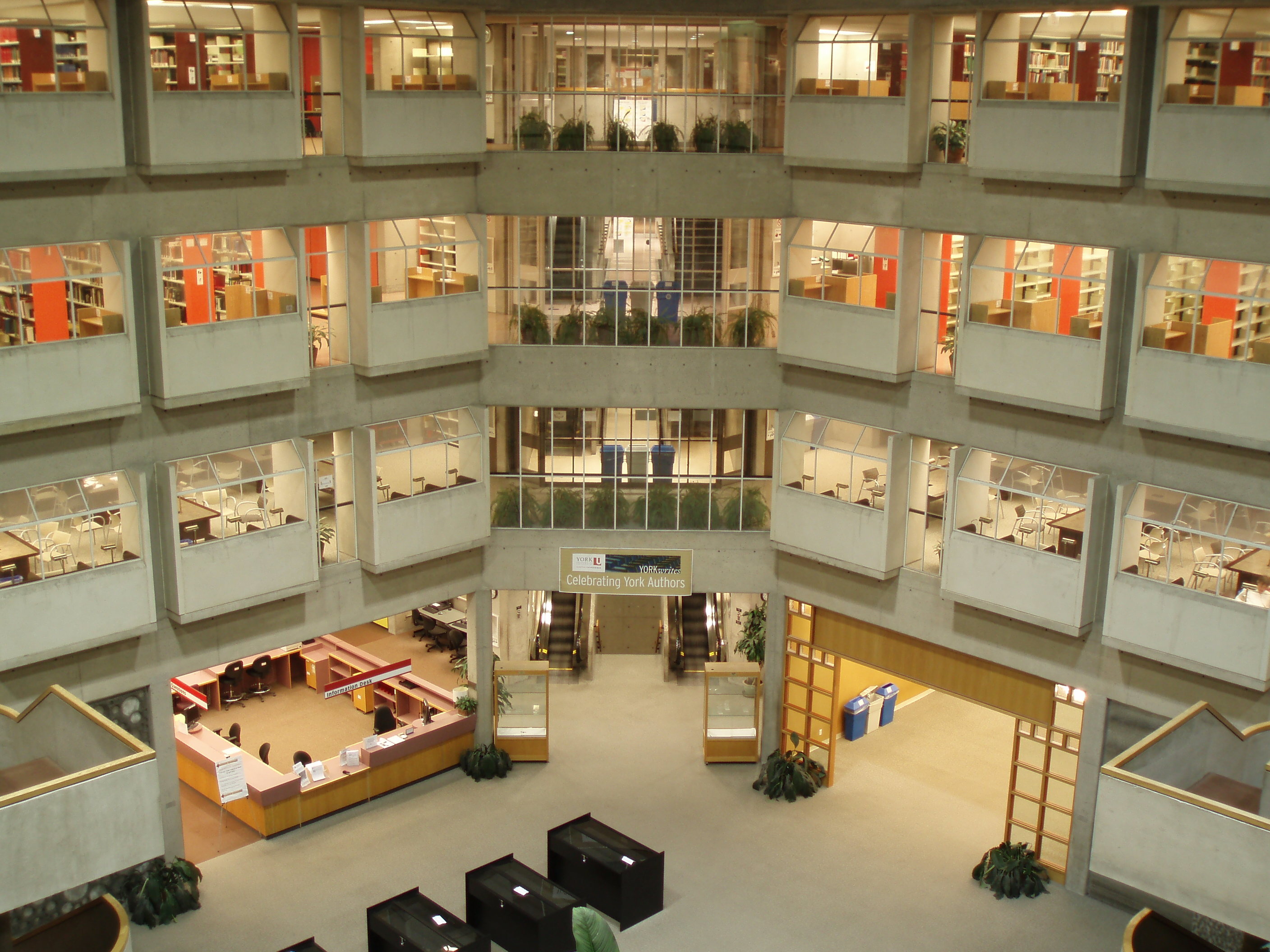
Interior view of Scott Library

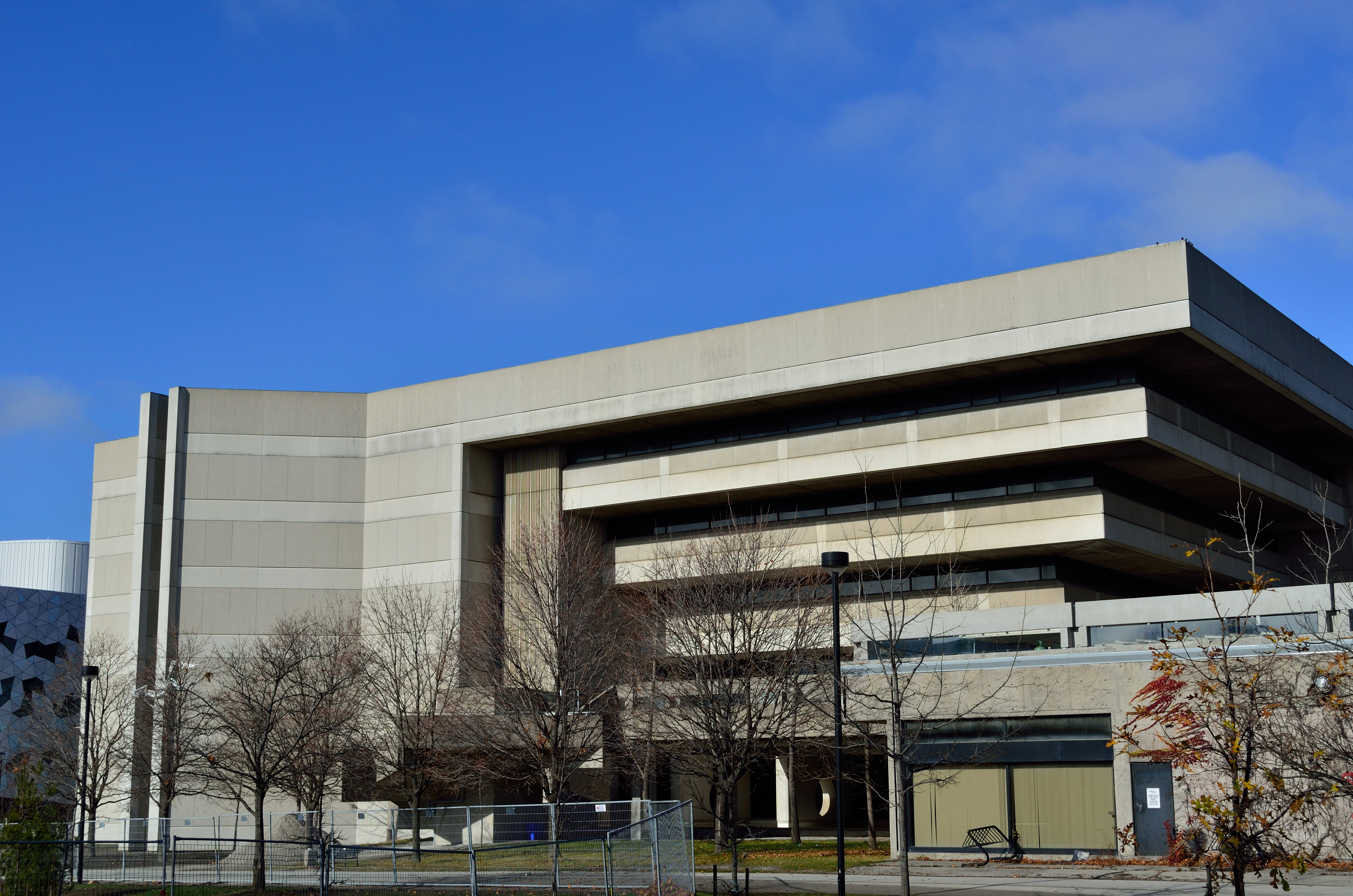
Scott Library exterior

A squirrel inside Keele Campus.

The main Scott Library is five stories tall and features thousands of books, periodicals, and other resources. There are designated quiet study areas as well as several small conference rooms which students can reserve to work on group projects.

The building is an example of the Brutalist architecture built at the campus in the 1960s and 1970s and based on a Ziggurat .

The library is named for William Pearson Scott, the member (1959-1971) Chair of the York University Board of Governors (1966-1971).

=== Steacie Science and Engineering Library ===
Named for Canadian chemist Edgar William Richard Steacie (1900-1962) and one three key libraries in Keele campus.

==== Sound and Moving Image Library ====
The Sound and Moving Images Library is located on the first floor of Scott Library and houses York's collection of audiovisual materials as well as materials strictly related to music and films. The Sound and Moving Image Collection (SMIC) holds over 10,000 physical media items and provides access to more than 150,000 streaming autio and video titles. A notable strength is in Jazz, accounting for 7,000 items. Roughly a total of a hundred DVD players, Blu-ray players, VCRs, and turntables are available for student use including access to quality headphones. The Sound and Moving Images Library is open Monday-Thursday from 9am-7pm and Fridays from 9am-5pm.

=== Petrie Science Building ===
Built in 1969 Petrie Science Building is home to the York University Observatory, which features two dome towers that house the observatory's astronomical telescopes. The building is named for Scottish-born Canadian astronomer Robert Methven Petrie (1906-1966).

=== Accolades ===
The Accolade Project comprises two new buildings, Accolade East and Accolade West, which frame the existing Fine Arts complex on the south side of The Common at the heart of York University's Keele campus. The new structures offer a wide range of academic, exhibition and performance facilities for teaching, learning, research, creative work and public presentation.

The Recital Hall just after grand opening performance.

The Accolade Project offers facilities for Canada's future artists and performers. Complementing the facilities of the Faculty of Fine Arts in the Joan & Martin Goldfarb Centre for Fine Arts, Burton Auditorium, the Centre for Film and Theatre, and the Technology-Enhanced Learning Building, Accolade brings all seven fine arts departments together.

==== Accolade East ====
Both the Department of Music and the Department of Dance have a new home with facilities in Accolade East. The Art Gallery of York University has also moved into Accolade East. Located east of the Centre for Film and Theatre, facing the Schulich School of Business, Accolade East features exhibition and performing arts facilities, The Sandra Faire and Ivan Fecan Theatre, and The Recital Hall, including the main box office, as well as classrooms and an open-access computer laboratory serving the entire university.

==== Accolade West ====
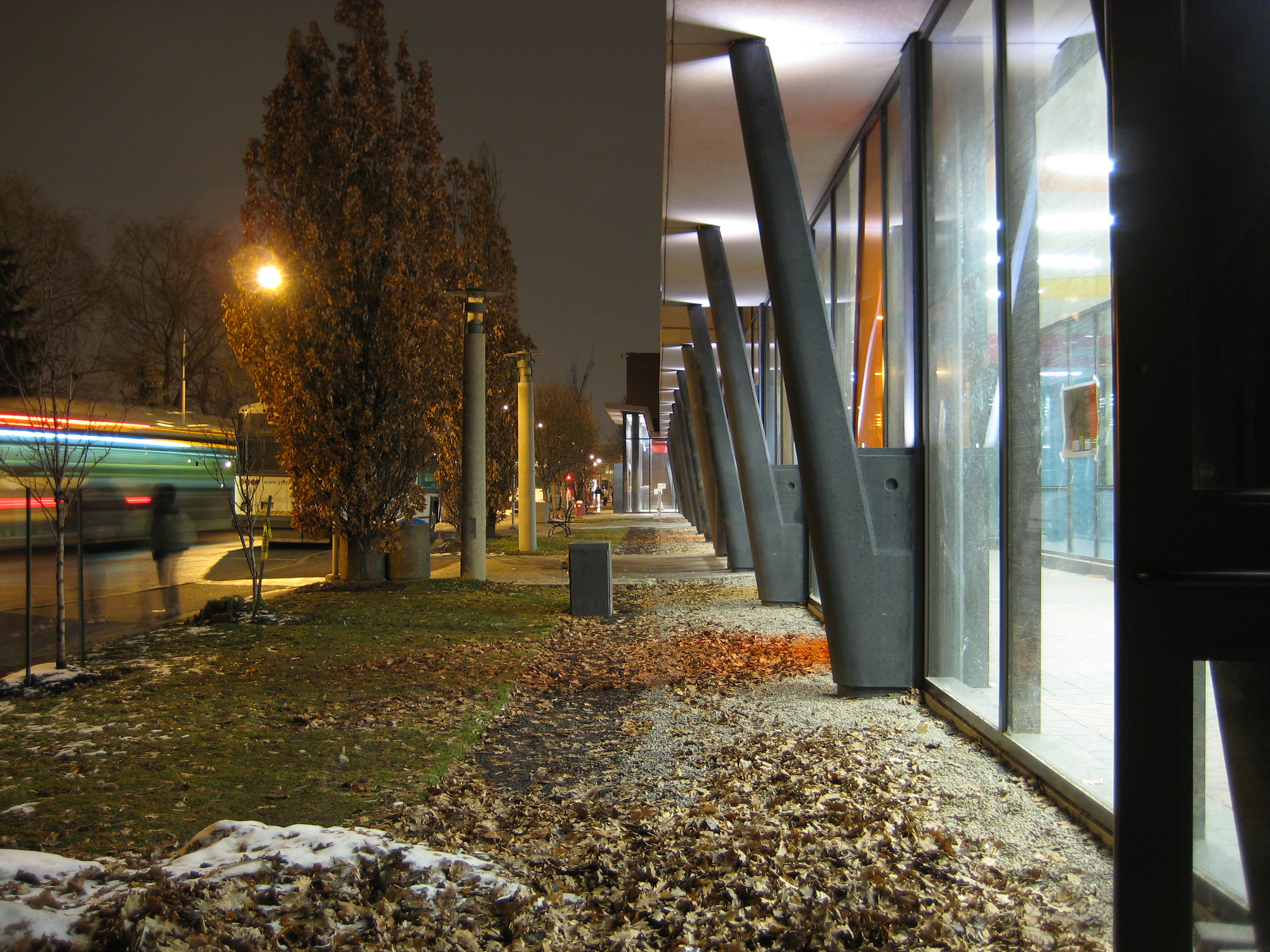
The main entrance to the Accolade West building

Located north of the Joan & Martin Goldfarb Centre for Fine Arts and adjacent to Burton Auditorium, Accolade West is used by students from across the university. A four-storey building dedicated primarily to academic studies, the building houses classrooms, seminar rooms and computer laboratories ranging in capacity from 40 to 400 seats. It houses the student-run gallery of the Department of Visual Arts as well as two new studios for the Fine Arts Cultural Studies program in the Faculty of Fine Arts.

=== Student Centres ===
The Student Centre at York University's Keele Campus comprises two major buildings: the original First Student Centre and the purpose-built Second Student Centre. Together they serve as the primary hub for student services, clubs, and social life.

==== First Student Centre ====
Located at 94 York Boulevard (4700 Keele Street), the First Student Centre acts as a centralized venue for student-organization offices, retail food outlets, and general student services. It anchors the campus' "living room" for student life, where fast-food and retail on the main level are complemented by offices and support services on the upper floors.

Functions include club and student-union offices, and student-run services.

==== Second Student Centre ====
In response to student-driven demand for a new dedicated facility, a campus-wide referendum was held in October 2013 in which approximately 90% of participating students voted in favour of creating a second Student Centre.

Designed by CannonDesign, the 126,000 square-foot building opened in 2018 and is situated at the north end of Roy McMurtry Green in the heart of the Keele campus. In transparent facade and sculptural gateway form serve as a symbolic "gateway" to student life.

The building houses study spaces, club offices, multi-faith prayer rooms (the entire fourth floor is devoted to multi-faith use) wellness and food-pantry supports, and dance studios, representing the university's extremely diverse student population.

=== York Lanes ===
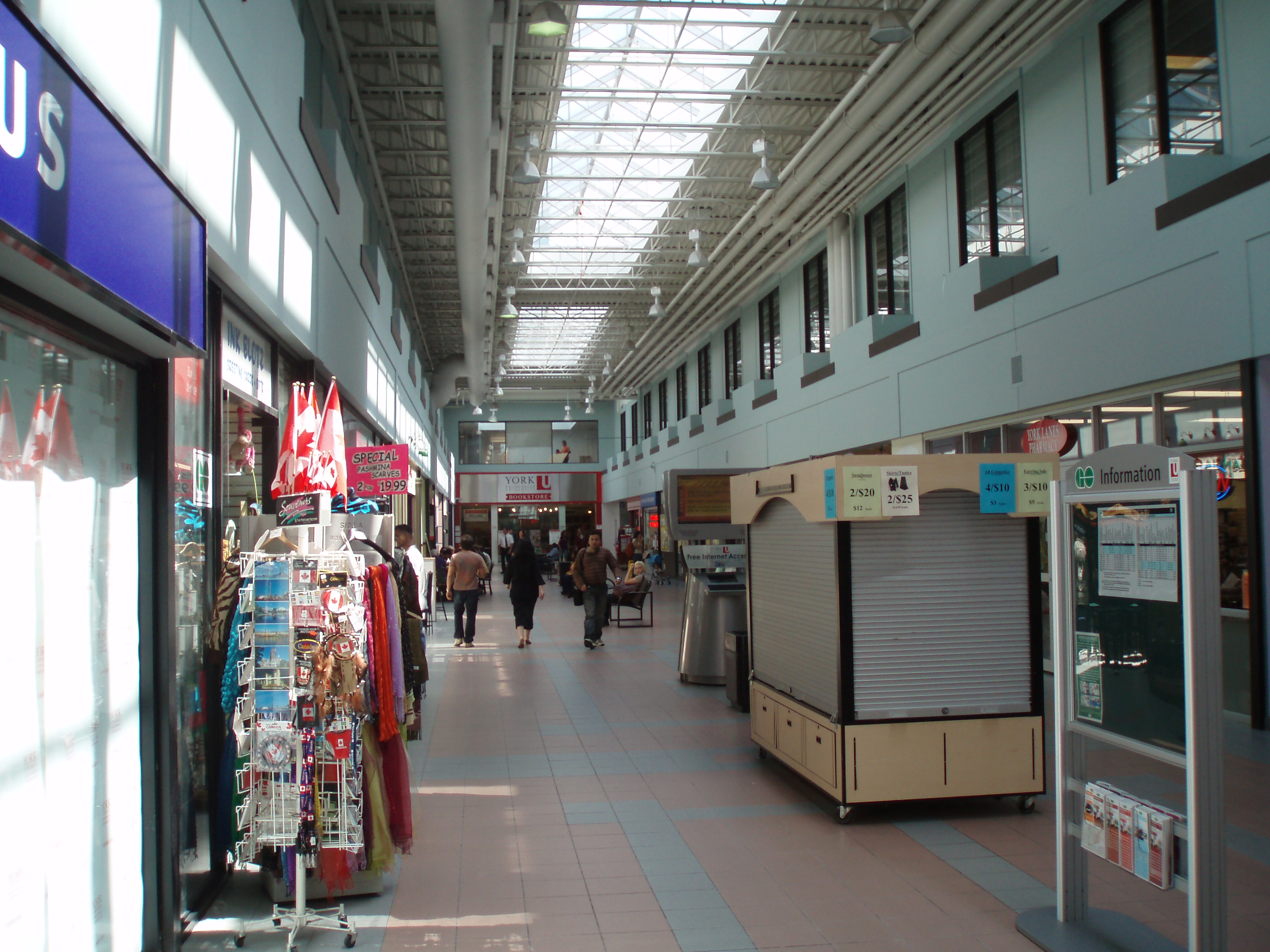
The York Lanes and the York University Bookstore

York Lanes is a two-storey mall at the Keele campus of York University in Toronto, Ontario.

The lower level has restaurants and retail stores including the York University Bookstore at the east end, as well as the on-campus medical office. Offices for faculty of various departments as well as various student groups are located on the second floor. York Lanes and the Student Centre feature a range of restaurants and services listed on York Lanes Eateries and York Food Services directories.

The layout of the mall is rectangular (long in the East-West direction). It is divided into three sections (arbitrarily based on the bends of the corridor, and not on any other difference between the sections or their contents). One main corridor runs along its length. Slightly diagonal towards the South-West corner at the start (the West Market), then East-West (The Main Wing), and finally turning south for a short span at the East end (the East Market). There is one branch off to a North exit where the West Market meets the Main Wing (where the corridor bends), and there is also a door to a narrow passageway at the West end (just adjacent to the bookstore and opposite the main East exit) to another back exit to the North. There is a two-storey parking garage north of the mall.

=== Curtis Lecture Halls ===
The Curtis Lecture Halls are a 3-4 floor complex of lecture halls of varying sizes. Built in 1971, the building is named for Air Vice-Marshal Wilfrid A. Curtis, founding organizing committee and first Chancellor of York (1959–1968).

=== York / Harry W. Arthurs Commons ===
The York Harry W. Arthurs Commons is an open long grassy area surrounded by various buildings like Vari Hall, Student Centre, York Lanes. It is named after former York President Harry Arthurs. Its eastern end is home to the campus' main subway station, York University station.

== Southern Campus ==
The southern part of the campus includes the buildings for York's non-Arts and non-Fine Arts faculties (Atkinson College, Osgoode Hall and Law Library, Seneca@York, Schulich Business School) as well as the Bennett Centre, which houses various student services, such as admissions, financial aid, and general inquiry.

=== Victor Phillip Dahdaleh Building (Formerly TEL) ===
The modern architecture of the TEL Building is visible with its large open spaces, sharp corners and open study areas

The Victor Phillip Dahdaleh building, colloquially referred to as the TEL Building (its former name), is located at 88 The Pond Road and was considered to be "cutting edge" during its initial inception. The building features 345,000 sq/ft (32,050 m^{2}) of floor space, 31 classrooms, 42 computer laboratories, three library and resource centres, a virtual reality centre, a 4000+ student capacity and cost $88 million to build. Construction began in November 2001 and was completed shortly after the building opened in January 2004. The building features modern architecture with large open spaces, sharply designed walls and incorporates smart technology throughout the building such as multipurpose Wi-Fi in both the 2.4 and 5.8 GHz bands. The building is named for York alumnus and businessperson Victor P. Dahdaleh.

=== Health, Nursing and Environmental Studies ===
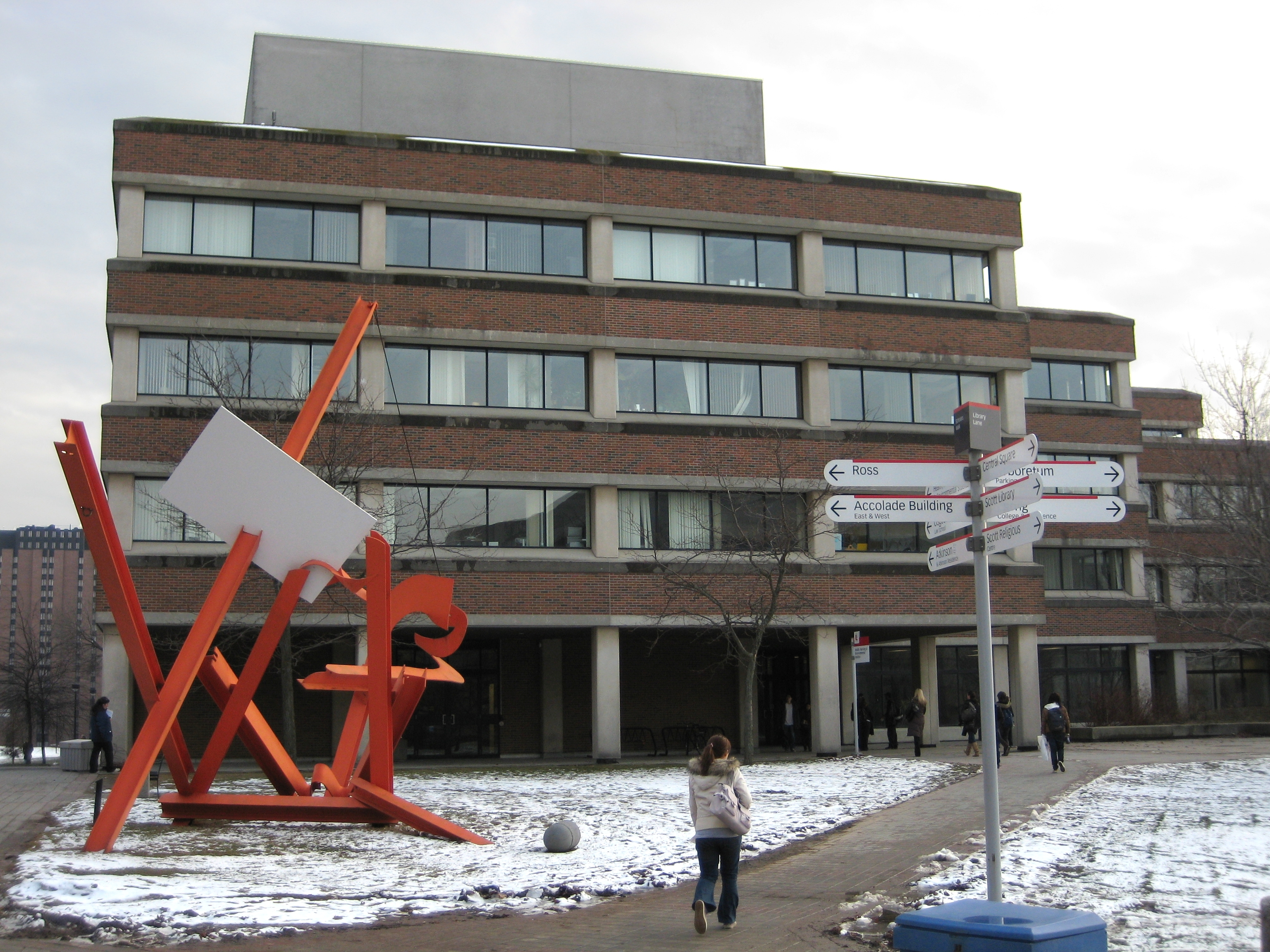
Health, Nursing and Environmental Studies Building

The HNE building, properly known as "Health, Nursing and Environmental Studies" was constructed as joint venture between the two faculties. The westernmost portion of the building hosts the Environmental Academic and Administrative offices while the Northern portion of the building hosts the Health and Nursing faculty. Scattered throughout the building are a number of lecture halls and seminar rooms, many of which are located at the lower levels and sub-basement levels.

=== Seneca @ York ===
at Seneca College shares space at the Keele campus with the Seneca@York building near Atkinson College.

=== Schulich School of Business ===
The Schulich School of Business at York University is one of Canada's premier business schools, offering undergraduate (BBA, iBBA), MBA, Executive MBA, and other graduate business programs.

Schulich holds a strong international reputation. It is ranked 1st in Canada and 27th in the world in Executive MBA rankings by the Financial Times. It is ranked 4th in Canada and 16th in the MBA programs integrating sustainability into the curriculum by Corporate Knights.

For the undergraduate BBA/iBBA programs, Schulich admits approximately 800 students per year.

For the MBA program, acceptance rate estimates are 25-30%. Average GMAT scores are approximately 660, and there is strong emphasis on holistic application components (leadership, video essays, interview) rather than purely test scores. It is named after a major benefactor and entrepreneur Seymour Schulich (1940-).

== Northern Campus ==
The northern part of the campus is heavy on residences (Vanier, Founders, Winters and McLaughlin), but also includes the Steadman Lecture Halls, as well as a hub for several athletic facilities:

- Alumni Field
- Canlan Ice Sports – York - formerly Beatrice Ice Gardens - ice rink that hosts home games for York Lions varsity hockey games & Toronto Six of the Premier Hockey Federation
- Sobeys Stadium - formerly the Rexall Centre & Aviva Centre; tennis stadium that hosts annual National Bank Open tournaments
- Tait McKenzie Centre - gym and pool named for Canadian born American sculptor, surgeon R. Tait McKenzie; hosts various York Lions varsity sports teams
- Toronto Track and Field Centre - formerly Metro Toronto Track and Field Centre
- York Lions Stadium - formerly CIBC Pan Am and Parapan Am Athletics Stadium; hosts York United FC Canadian Premier League, Toronto FC II MLS NEXT Pro, and AFC Toronto NSL. The Toronto Arrows of Major League Rugby were tenants from 2022 to 2023 before ceasing operations.

Former athletic facilities:

- National Tennis Centre (Canada) replaced by the Aviva Centre; bleachers and court surfaces were removed and now an abandoned site.

In addition, the campus' other subway station, Pioneer Village station, is on its northern edge just west of the Track and Field Centre.

== Western Campus ==
Stong Pond, close to Stong residence.

The western part of the campus also has several residences (Bethune, Calumet and Stong) and several academic buildings, as well as the Steacie Science & Engineering library. A notable presence is the William Small building, which used to house a large "computer pool" and currently houses the university's Transportation and Security departments.

Typical animal at the western campus.

Aviva Centre is located on the west side of the campus having moved over from the Toronto Track and Field Centre to the north.

Stong Pond is a storm water pond that was rebuilt to handle stormwater drained from around the entire campus.

== Residences ==
York is home to several residences:

- Atkinson Residence - 9 floor complex named for Toronto Star publisher Joseph E. Atkinson
- Calumet - four floor apartment complex consisting of 11 houses with four co-ed suites each. Each suite consists of six occupants with four single bedrooms and one double bedroom. The occupants share two bathrooms, a kitchen, and a lounge area.
- Founder's - four floor low-rise apartment complex
- Harry Sherman Crowe Co-op - 7 floor complex named for Professor Harry Sherman Crowe, educator, administrator and labour researcher at York University (Administrator of Atkinson College) and United College (now University of Winnipeg)
- Norman Bethune - 14 storey tower named for Dr. Norman Bethune
- Passy Gardens - 3 storey towers and named for Claude Passy, who owned the Hoover residence in 1958 and sold to the University in 1964.
- QUAD - Located at the corner of The Pond Road and Sentinel Road. Phases 1 and 2 feature over 1,500 beds. Phase 3, targeting completion for fall 2026, will feature an additional 841 beds across two 8-story buildings.
- Stong - 14 storey tower named for area settlers and owners of the land where the Keele campus sits Daniel and Jacob Stong
- The Pond Road - 9 floor complex named for the Tennis Canada (York) Pond and Stong Pond (source of Hoover Creek) next to the York Arboretum
- Tatham Hall - 13 storey tower named for Professor George Tatham, founding Master of McLaughlin College
- Vanier - 13 storey tower named for former Governor General of Canada Georges Vanier
- Winters - four floor low-rise apartment complex named for former Liberal MP and cabinet minister Robert Winters

=== The Village ===
Beyond the university's Southern border (The Pond Rd) lies a subdivision referred to as The Village. While not on university property, many students who do not live in the University residences live in the townhouses used as rooming houses.

== Jacob Stong House and Barn ==
The campus also hosts a historic home and barn located at the northeast end of the campus.

The barn is believed to have been built around or after 1854 and the house before 1860.

Both were owned by the Stong family until 1951 and later by York University for housing as well as studio facility for the Faculty of Fine Arts. The two buildings have historic designation by the City of Toronto.
