= Chloe Charles =

Canadian singer-songwriter

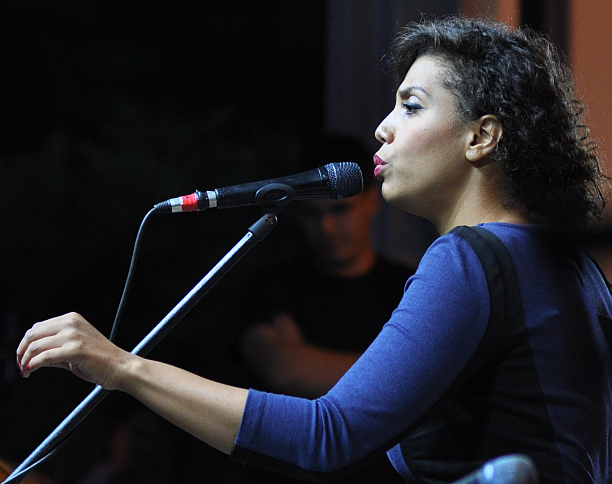

Background information
- Origin: Toronto, Ontario, Canada
- Genres: Soul, Jazz, Pop, Folk
- Years active: 2010–present
- Labels: Make My Day, Beejazz, Good International

Chloe Charles (born 1985) is a Canadian singer songwriter in the genre of orchestra soul pop. Known for her unique voice and self-taught finger-picking guitar style and fusion of soul, folk, pop, jazz, and classical influences.

Charles launched her solo music career in 2010 with the release of the EP Little Green Bud and played over 200 shows in eight countries within 18 months to support the album. Dryvetyme Onlyne, USA picked Little Green Bud as one of the best EPs of 2010.

Her debut full-length album, Break the Balance, was released in November 2012 in Germany and later in Austria, Canada, Belgium, France, United Kingdom, Netherlands, South Korea, and Switzerland. Break The Balance has been critically acclaimed by well-known media sources including Billboard Magazine, Rolling Stone, Mojo, London Times, Die Zeit, Glamour, The Globe and Mail, Guitar World, Andre Manoukin on France's Inter Radio and has received extensive radio airplay on FIP Radio (France), Radio 6 (Netherlands), Flux (Germany) and picked as Song of the Week on CBC Radio's Here & Now (Canada).

Charles was the winner of the 2012 Harbourfront Soundclash Music Award and 2014 Indie Award.

== Early life ==
Charles was born in Toronto, Ontario, Canada. Her mother Victoria Richmond is Canadian of English, Scottish and Irish descent. After her parents divorce, Chloe was raised by her mother, first in Toronto and then in Uxbridge Township where she grew up on her grandfather's rural property. Her grandfather is the late John Richmond (1926–2013), renowned Canadian visual artist.

Her father Noel Charles (1940–2013) was Trinidadian, however he lived most of his adult life in Europe and Barbados He last resided in Mallorca, Spain with his wife Cynthia Lennon, first wife of John Lennon and mother of Julian Lennon. Charles's father was the owner of the famous Alexandra nightclub in Stockholm, Sweden, and Bridgetown, Barbados.

She graduated from Uxbridge Secondary School in 2003, then in 2005 Charles was awarded a full scholarship to York University, Glendon College, in Toronto, where she went on to graduate with Honours in 2009, on the Dean's List, with a BA (Honours) degree in psychology.

== Music career ==
Charles began singing at age nine when she joined a local musical theatre performance, a step she later credited for helping her overcome her musical shyness.

In 2010 Charles released her first EP titled Little Green Bud, produced by Brent Bodrug. It was received with critical acclaim in Canada and the US and Charles toured extensively to support the EP.

Later that year, Charles met Austin, Texas based singer songwriter, Aly Tadros at Folk Alliance International in Memphis, Tennessee and the pair began touring together across the US, Ontario and Quebec. In 2011 Charles formed a singer-songwriter collective called The Sweetness with Tadros, Austin, Texas, based Douglas Jay Boyd, and Toronto-based classical bass player Sam Mclellan. Together they toured Europe, the United Kingdom, Canada and the US.

In 2011 Charles joined Toronto collective Sacred Balance, as lead singer and co-writer with composer Pouya Hamidi. She also began collaborating with Ninja Funk Orchestra, a jazz based live electro dubstep band from Toronto, as singer and co-writer. Their song Fans was placed in the award-winning Canadian feature film, Picture Day (film).

Charles recorded Break The Balance, produced by Duane Lundy, in December 2011, with a babbling stream running outside the studio. It was first released in Germany, Switzerland and Austria on November 29, 2012, on Make My Day Records. The Canadian release was in February 2013 distributed by Outside Distribution.

Following a showcase in Bremen Germany at Jazzahead in spring 2013, Charles signed with Beejazz Records to release Break The Balance in France and secured booking agents, Paperclip Booking Agency for Europe and AIM Booking for Canada.

The Richmond Hill, Ontario, chapter of TEDx invited Charles to their 2013 conference. The title of her presentation was: "Nothing is Perfect and Everything is Perfect".

== Critical acclaim ==
- In 2014, the Times UK called her "the next big thing in jazz".
- In April 2014 Mojo Magazine gave Break The Balance 4 out of 5 stars.
- In 2013 Billboard Magazine picked Chloe as one of 'Five Top Canadian Artists To Watch".
- In 2012, Chloe was featured in Guitar World's 10 Female Guitarists You Should Know series.
- According to The Globe and Mail, her sounds have been compared to Joni Mitchell, Joanna Newsom, and even Meshell Ndegeocello.
- "Toronto's next big singer-songwriter".
- "Judging by the strength of her debut record, Chloe Charles is well positioned to break through the noise [with] Break The Balance…a collection of orchestral and jazz-touched folk pop songs with a healthy dose of experimentation—at its core is Chloe's classical guitar prowess which led Guitar World Magazine to name her one of the top 10 female guitarists you should know– and Then, then there's her Voice, an instrument unto itself, and one that bends effortlessly to demonstrate strength intimacy, excitement…"[Chloe's] going to be one of those people we get to know in the coming years in Canada and beyond!" (Jian Ghomeshi, CBC Radio "Q")

== Awards and nominations ==
- Winner - Harbourfront Soundclash Award (2012)
- Winner - SiriusXM Indie Award - Best Soul/R&B Artist or Duo of the Year (2014)
- Winner - John Lennon Songwriting Contest - Grand Prize Winner in Pop Category (2014)
- Winner - Lennon Award - Pop Category (2014)
- Winner - Victor Martin Lynch- Staunton Award - Canada Council of the Arts (2016)

== TV appearances ==
- Featured Musical Act on Taratata (France)
- Featured Musical Act on Le Ring (France)

== Touring ==
Since 2010 after releasing her first EP, Charles has played over 500 shows in 10 countries (Canada, US, Germany, Switzerland, Belgium, France, UK, Netherlands, Ireland and Italy). The online magazine Exclaim.ca said of her show that it is "mezmerizing."

In 2014, Charles opened the Rodriquez UK tour, Anna Calvi Amsterdam show and Naturally 7 UK tour. During the summer she played nine European festivals including: North Sea Jazz Festival, Womad, Love Supreme, Larmer Tree and Musiques au Musee and Women of the World.

Since 2011, Charles has played SWSX (South by Southwest), CMW (Canadian Music Week), NXNE (North by Northeast), Ottawa Bluesfest, Crossing Border Festival, sold out 2 shows at the London Jazz Festival, So What's Next Festival, Toronto Beaches Jazz Festival, sold out 2 shows at Paris' Sunset/Sunside, opened for Maceo Parker at the Markham Jazz Festival.

== Discography ==
=== Studio releases ===
SOLO

- Break The Balance (LP) [2012]
- Little Green Bud (EP) [2010]
- With Blindfolds On (LP) [2016]

COLLABORATION

- Fans (EP) w/ Ninja Funk Orchestra [2012]
- Fans (EP) w/ Sacred Balance [2012]
- What's it like to be a sprinkler, I wonder? (EP) w/ The Sweetness [2011]
- Live at Eddie's Attic (EP) w/ Aly Tadros [2011]

=== Chart positions ===
- #9 iTunes Rock Chart, France
- #1 Amazon Folk Chart

=== Labels and distributors ===
- Canada - Independent, Distributed by Outside Distribution
- Germany, Switzerland, Austria, Netherlands, Belgium, Luxembourg - Make My Day
- France - Beejazz
- UK - Independent, Distributed Harmonia Mundi
- South Korea - Good International
