= Toronto Special =

Canadian free magazine

The Special is a free city life news magazine in Toronto, Ontario, Canada, published by Midnight Media, It focuses on Canadian celebrity, politics, products and ideas, fashion and trends, and it was first published in 2002. Established as an insert in the student newspaper of York University, it eventually became a free community newspaper, followed by a shift in focus to entertainment. The magazine had a readership of over 15,000 people by 2007.
