= National Institute on Ageing =

Canadian think tank, founded in 2016

The National Institute on Ageing (NIA) is a Canadian think tank, founded in 2016, that is focused on issues related to ageing, such as health, housing, retirement, and social wellness. The NIA is based at Toronto Metropolitan University in Toronto, Ontario.

The Seniors Strategy for Canada—an annual NIA report on the state of public policy related to Canada's ageing population— was first published in 2015 when there was a demographic shift in Canada's population as the number of Canadians aged 65 and over increased. In 2015, this demographic outnumbered children under 15.

In 2022, the NIA launched an annual survey called the "NIA Ageing in Canada Survey" in partnership with the Environics Institute for Survey Research to track Canadians' perspectives, experiences, and expectations of aging over from 2022 to 2032, focusing on social well-being, financial security, and health and independence.
