= Canada's World =

Canada's World is a collaborative discussion between Canadian citizens, universities, and organizations on Canada's role in the world. It began in 2007. Topics include economic development, diversity, and promotion of human rights. Participating citizens have expressed a sense of disconnect with the government.
