= George Tatham =

Australian rules footballer, born 1910

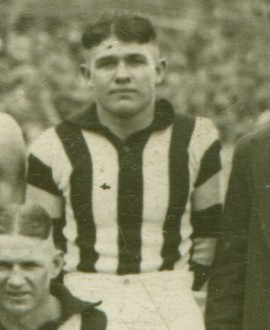
- Tatham during his Collingwood career

Personal information
- Full name: George William Tatham
- Born: 24 December 1910; Fitzroy North, Victoria
- Died: 23 February 1976 (aged 65); Coburg, Victoria
- Original team: Collingwood District
- Height: 171 cm (5 ft 7 in)
- Weight: 68 kg (150 lb)

Playing career^{1}
Years	Club	Games (Goals)
1931, 1933	Collingwood	23 (16)
1934–38	Camberwell (VFA)	63 (116)
- ^{1} Playing statistics correct to the end of 1938.

George William Tatham (24 December 1910 – 23 February 1976) was an Australian rules footballer who played with Collingwood in the Victorian Football League (VFL).

After 23 games with Collingwood, Tatham played for Camberwell in the Victorian Football Association until being struck off the list early in the 1938 season for disciplinary reasons. Camberwell refused to grant permits for the three suspended players until the next year, at which time Tatham moved to Mordialloc.

Tatham later served in the Australian Army during World War II.
