= Centre for Global Challenges =

- Abbreviation: CGC
- Formation: March 24, 2010
- Type: Public policy think tank
- Headquarters: Glendon Campus, 2270 Bayview
- Location: Toronto, Ontario
- Director: Alex Himelfarb
- Website: http://globalchallenges.ca/

The Centre for Global Challenges is a bilingual and non-partisan public policy forum associated with the Glendon School of Public and International Affairs. The CGC promotes public discussion of key issues. It seeks to bring together thought leaders – practitioners and scholars, policy makers and researchers – to explore the Canadian implications of key challenges like harnessing the global economy, adapting health and social architecture for the knowledge economy and the new demography, accommodating religion, diversity and common citizenship, and improving public institutions.

== Governance ==
Alex Himelfarb is the Director of the Centre and Alexandre Brassard is the Coordinator.

The Centre is also guided by the Advisory Committee of the Glendon School of Public and International Affairs. Current committee members include: Chaviva Hošek (chairperson), Rosalie Abella, Kim Campbell, Mel Cappe, David Collenette, Kenneth Courtis, Paule Doré, Graham Fraser, Paul Genest, Roger Gibbins, Chantal Hébert, Roy L. Heenan, Claude Lamoureux, Ian H. Macdonald, Peter J. Meekison, Michael Meighen, L. Jacques Ménard, André Pratte, Paul S. Rouleau, Jean-Louis Roy and Paul Wells.
