= Australian National University =

National research university in Canberra

The Australian National University
- Coat of arms
- Motto: Latin: Naturam Primum Cognoscere Rerum
- Motto in English: "First to learn the nature of things"
- Type: Public national research university
- Established: 1 August 1946; 80 years ago
- Academic affiliations: Group of Eight; IARU; APRU; AURA; UA
- Endowment: A$346.25 million (2022)
- Budget: A$1.36 billion (2022)
- Chancellor: Dr. Gordon de Brouwer AO PSM
- Vice-Chancellor: Rebekah Brown (interim)
- Students: 17,380 (2023)
- Undergraduates: 10,252 (2023)
- Postgraduates: 7,128 (2023)
- Location: Canberra, Australian Capital Territory, 2600, Australia; 35°16′40″S 149°07′14″E
- Campus: Urban, parkland and regional, 145 hectares (358.3 acres)
- Colours: ANU Gold
- Nickname: Owls
- Sporting affiliations: UniSport; EAEN
- Mascot: Owl
- Website: anu.edu.au

The Australian National University (ANU) is a public research university and member of the Group of Eight, located in Canberra, the capital of Australia. Its main campus in Acton encompasses seven teaching and research colleges, in addition to several national academies and institutes.

Established in 1946, ANU is the only university to have been created by the Parliament of Australia. (Note: The University of Canberra was also created by the Parliament of Australia (as the Canberra College of Advanced Education), but that institution did not have university status until after it was transferred to the ACT Government.) It traces its origins to Canberra University College, which was established in 1929 and was integrated into ANU in 1960. ANU enrolled 10,252 undergraduate and 7,128 postgraduate students and employed 4,517 staff as of 2023. The university's endowment stood at A$1.8 billion as of 2018.

ANU counts six Nobel laureates and 49 Rhodes scholars among its faculty and alumni. The university has educated the incumbent Governor-General of Australia, two former prime ministers, and more than a dozen current heads of government departments of Australia. The latest releases of ANU's scholarly publications are held through ANU Press online. The entry requirements of many programmes are selective with high ATAR scores requirements. ANU has consistently been ranked as one of the best universities in Australia.

In 2024, Vice-Chancellor Genevieve Bell announced "Renew ANU," a $250 million cost-cutting and restructuring program designed to offset severe budgetary deficits and reduce expenditures by 16.5 per cent. The fiscal retrenchment led to widespread staff redundancies, with estimates indicating a net loss of over 1,000 personnel between April 2024 and late 2025. Academic offerings were also heavily impacted, culminating in the closure or downscaling of academic bodies, including the ANU School of Music, the Humanities Research Centre, the Centre for European Studies, and the Australian National Dictionary Centre. Following a 14-month compliance review completed in 2026, the Tertiary Education Quality and Standards Agency (TEQSA) found that ANU had breached three national higher education standards relating to corporate governance oversight, accountability, risk management, and sustainable operations. The regulator subsequently placed four binding conditions on ANU's registration—making it the only public university in Australia subject to active registration conditions. These mandates forced the university to initiate a Governance and Council Strengthening Programme overseen by independent, TEQSA-approved experts, alongside enforcing mandatory orientation, training, and information-flow reviews for university leadership. In June 2026, interim Vice-Chancellor Rebekah Brown revealed that a series of leadership scandals and executive failures had cost the university an estimated $100 million in reputational damage.

== History ==
=== Origins (1900-99) ===
Calls for the establishment of a national university in Australia began as early as 1900. After the location of the nation's capital, Canberra, was determined in 1908, land was set aside for a university at the foot of Black Mountain in the city designs by Walter Burley Griffin. Establishment of the ANU was prolonged by World War II but resumed with the creation of the Department of Post-War Reconstruction in 1942, ultimately leading to the passage of the Australian National University Act 1946 by the Chifley government on 1 August 1946.

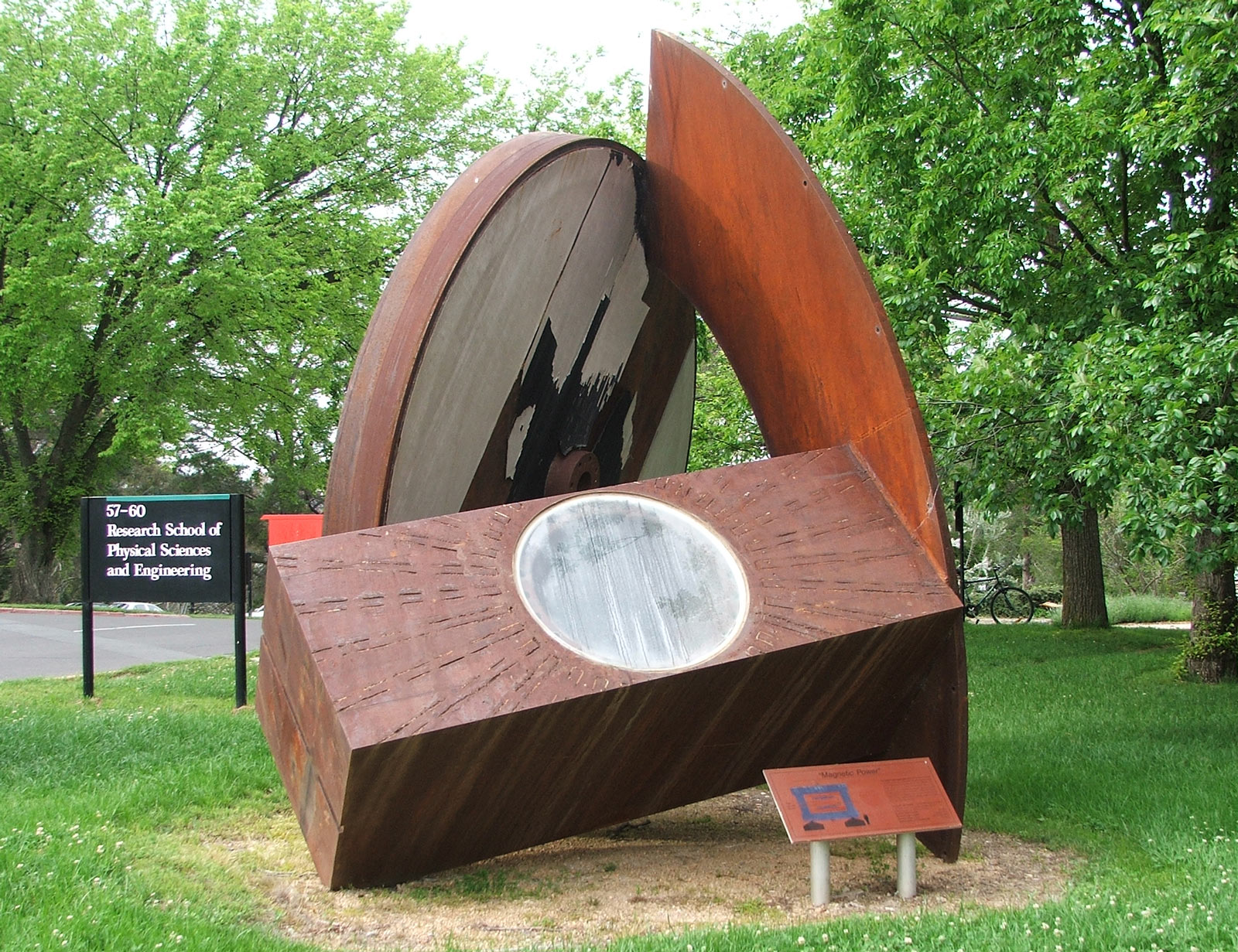
Remains of the ANU homopolar generator designed by Mark Oliphant

A group of Australian scholars served as advisors, including Sir Howard Florey (co-developer of medicinal penicillin), Sir Mark Oliphant (a nuclear physicist who worked on the Manhattan Project), and Sir Keith Hancock (the Chichele Professor of Economic History at Oxford). The group also included a New Zealander, Sir Raymond Firth (a professor of anthropology at LSE), who had earlier worked in Australia for some years. Economist Sir Douglas Copland was appointed as ANU's first Vice-Chancellor and former Prime Minister Stanley Bruce served as the first Chancellor. ANU was originally organised into four centres—the Research Schools of Physical Sciences, Social Sciences and Pacific Studies and the John Curtin School of Medical Research.

The first residents' hall, University House, was opened in 1954 for faculty members and postgraduate students. Mount Stromlo Observatory, established by the federal government in 1924, became part of ANU in 1957. The first locations of the ANU Library, the Menzies and the General Studies Library (in 1970 renamed the J.B. Chifley Library) buildings, opened in 1963. The Australian Forestry School, located in Canberra since 1927, was amalgamated by ANU in 1965.

Canberra University College (CUC) was the first institution of higher education in the national capital, having been established in 1929 and enrolling its first undergraduate pupils in 1930. Its founding was led by Chairman of the CUC Council Sir Robert Garran, one of the drafters of the Australian Constitution and the first Solicitor-General of Australia. CUC was affiliated with the University of Melbourne and its degrees were granted by that university. Academic leaders at CUC included historian Manning Clark, political scientist Finlay Crisp, poet A. D. Hope, and economist Heinz Arndt.

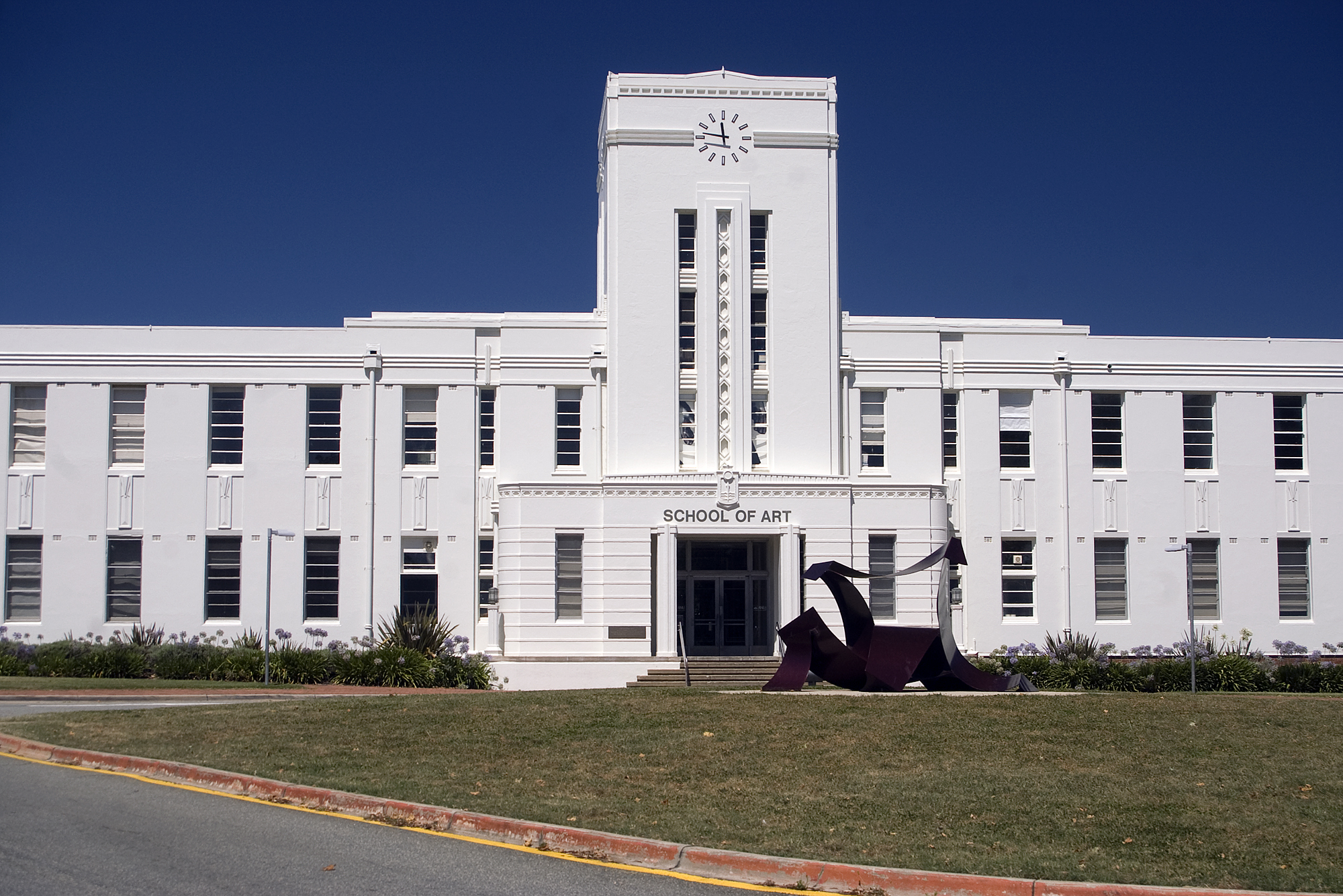
ANU School of Art located at the former Canberra High School building

In 1960, CUC was integrated into ANU as the School of General Studies, initially with faculties in arts, economics, law and science. Faculties in Oriental studies and engineering were introduced later. Bruce Hall, the first residential college for undergraduates, opened in 1961.

The Canberra School of Music and the Canberra School of Art were combined by the Canberra Institute of the Arts Ordinance 1988 to form the Canberra Institute of the Arts, and amalgamated with the university as the ANU Institute of the Arts in 1992.

=== Modern era (2000-present) ===
ANU established its Medical School in 2002, after obtaining federal government approval in 2000.

On 18 January 2003, the Canberra bushfires largely destroyed the Mount Stromlo Observatory. ANU astronomers as of 2013 conducted research from the Siding Spring Observatory, which contains 10 telescopes including the Anglo-Australian Telescope.

In February 2013, financial entrepreneur and ANU graduate Graham Tuckwell made the largest university donation in Australian history by giving $50 million to fund an undergraduate scholarship program at ANU.

ANU had funding and staff cuts in the School of Music in 2011–15 and in the School of Culture, History and Language in 2016. As of 2017 there were a range of global (governmental) endowments available for Arts and Social Sciences, designated only for ANU. Further, some courses were delivered online.

ANU's student activism led to its fossil fuel divestment campaign, which was as of 2014 one of the longest-running in the country. The decision of the ANU Council to divest from two fossil fuel companies in 2014 was criticised by senior members of the Abbott government, including Prime Minister Tony Abbott, Treasurer Joe Hockey, and Finance Minister Mathias Cormann, but defended by Vice Chancellor and ocean engineering expert Ian Young, who opined, "On divestment, it is clear we were in the right and played a truly national and international leadership role.... [W]e seem to have played a major role in a movement which now seems unstoppable. As of 2014 ANU held investments in major fossil fuel companies.

In 2017, Chinese hackers infiltrated the computers of Australian National University, potentially compromising national security research conducted at the university.

The following year, the university's problem securing its computers arose again. In June 2019, the university disclosed that a cyber actor had successfully breached its internal defenses in late 2018, gaining unauthorized access to 19 years of historical records. The compromised data contained sensitive staff and student information, including bank account numbers, tax file numbers, academic records, and passport details.

A survey conducted by the Australian Human Rights Commission in 2017 found that the ANU had the second-highest incidence of sexual assault and sexual harassment. 3.5 per cent of respondents from the ANU reported being sexually assaulted in 2016. In response, the ANU Women's Department launched the annual "August 1st" campaign and protest movement to pressure the university administration into reforming its sexual assault and sexual harassment policies. Vice Chancellor Brian Schmidt apologised to victims of sexual assault and harassment.

The university's problems with sexual assault and harassment spiked thereafter, however. In national survey findings from the 2021 National Student Safety Survey, the university recorded the highest rate of sexual harassment (26.1%) and the second-highest rate of sexual assault (12.3%) among students since commencing study. These statistics contrasted with the national university markedly lower averages of approximately one in six students experiencing harassment, and one in 20 (5%) experiencing assault. The university faced public criticism and student-led protests regarding its institutional responses and historical handling of assault allegations. Nevertheless, in 2023, independent surveys and case studies highlighted instances where students reported filling out official ANU complaint forms following an assault--but never received a follow-up response from the university leadership. Additionally, the university faced scrutiny over data privacy failures within its internal networks. In June 2026, investigations revealed that spreadsheets detailing sensitive student disclosures—including full names, contact details, and explicit allegations of sexual assault and harassment—had been left visible to all staff and students logged into the university's Microsoft 365 cloud platform.

In late 2025, former ANU academic Dr. Richard Emory McGary Jr. was sentenced to six years in prison following a Supreme Court conviction for the sexual assault of an ANU student in 2016, and another woman in 2020. However, in September 2026, the Australian Capital Territory Court of Appeal overturned the convictions related to the 2016 incident, ordering that he would not face a retrial on those specific charges while leaving open a potential retrial for the 2020 allegations.

In July 2026, ANU leadership issued a formal apology during public hearings for the Royal Commission on Antisemitism and Social Cohesion regarding its handling of campus protests. Interim Vice-Chancellor Rebekah Brown acknowledged that ANU failed to protect the psychological and psychosocial safety of Jewish staff and students during a pro-Palestinian encampment on the Canberra campus. The encampment, established on April 29, 2024, and disbanded in mid-August 2024, operated for 110 days, making it the longest-running campus encampment in Australia. An internal workplace safety review finalized by the university in October 2024 had previously determined that the direct and residual psychosocial risks associated with the encampment were "high," leaving Jewish students feeling isolated and unable to fully participate in campus life. During the Royal Commission, witnesses detailed how Jewish community members were subjected to targeted harassment, including being spat on and labeled as "baby killers" or "genocide supporters." Student testimonies revealed that the hostile environment forced some individuals to conceal their Jewish identity and heritage out of fear for their physical safety. Acting Provost Joan Leach conceded that the university adopted a passive, "light-touch" approach to the protest, admitting that administrative action was significantly delayed.

In June 2026, during a Parliamentary Senate estimates hearing, interim Vice-Chancellor Rebekah Brown revealed that a series of continuous high-profile leadership scandals and executive failures had cost the university an estimated $100 million in reputational damage. The university's internal modeling indicated that the ongoing controversies had negatively impacted long-term international student recruitment pipelines and caused multiple major philanthropic donors to freeze or withdraw funding from the university.

== Campuses and buildings ==
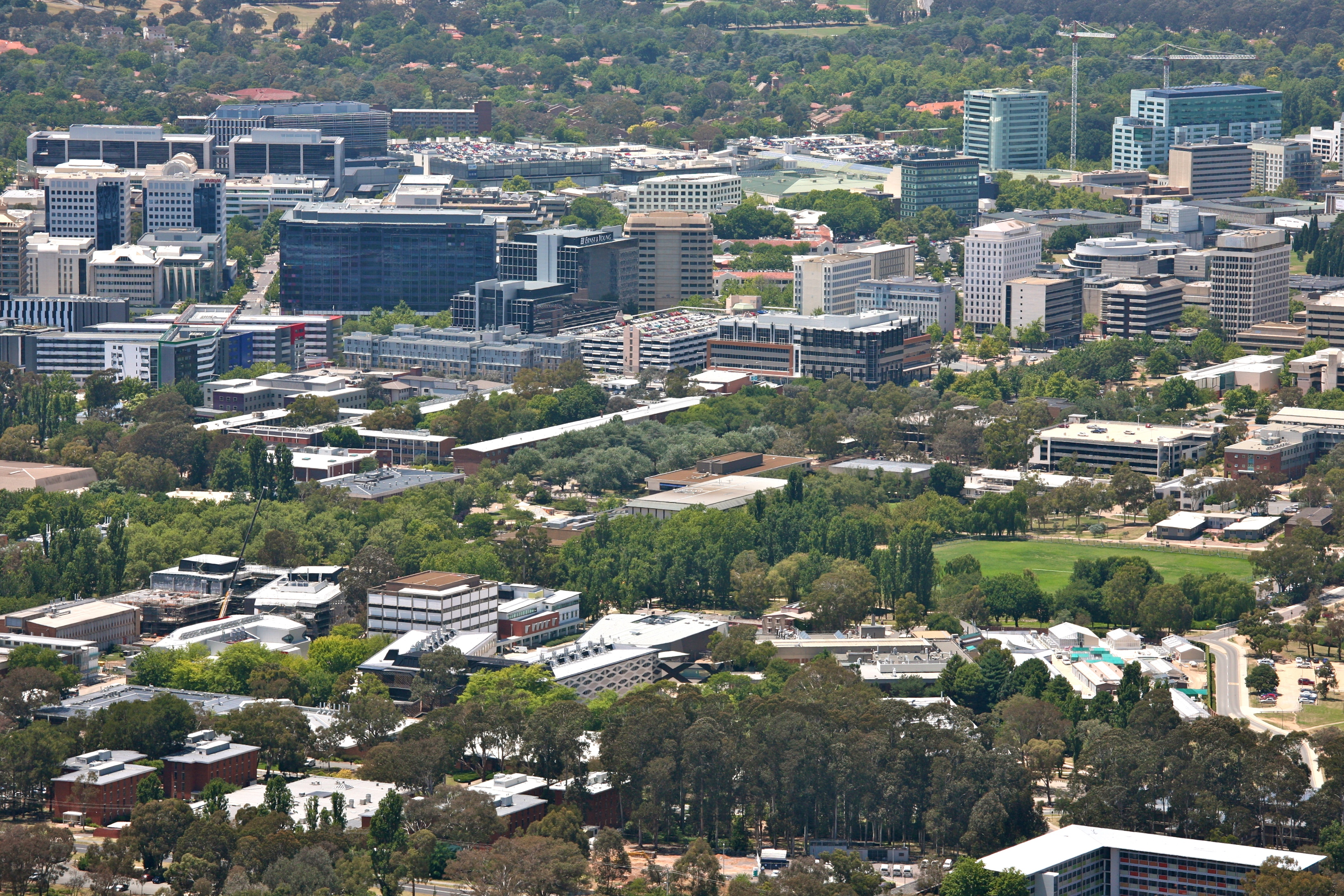
ANU's main campus in Acton, Canberra

Sullivans Creek with the Marie Reay Teaching Centre and Chifley Library visible behind it

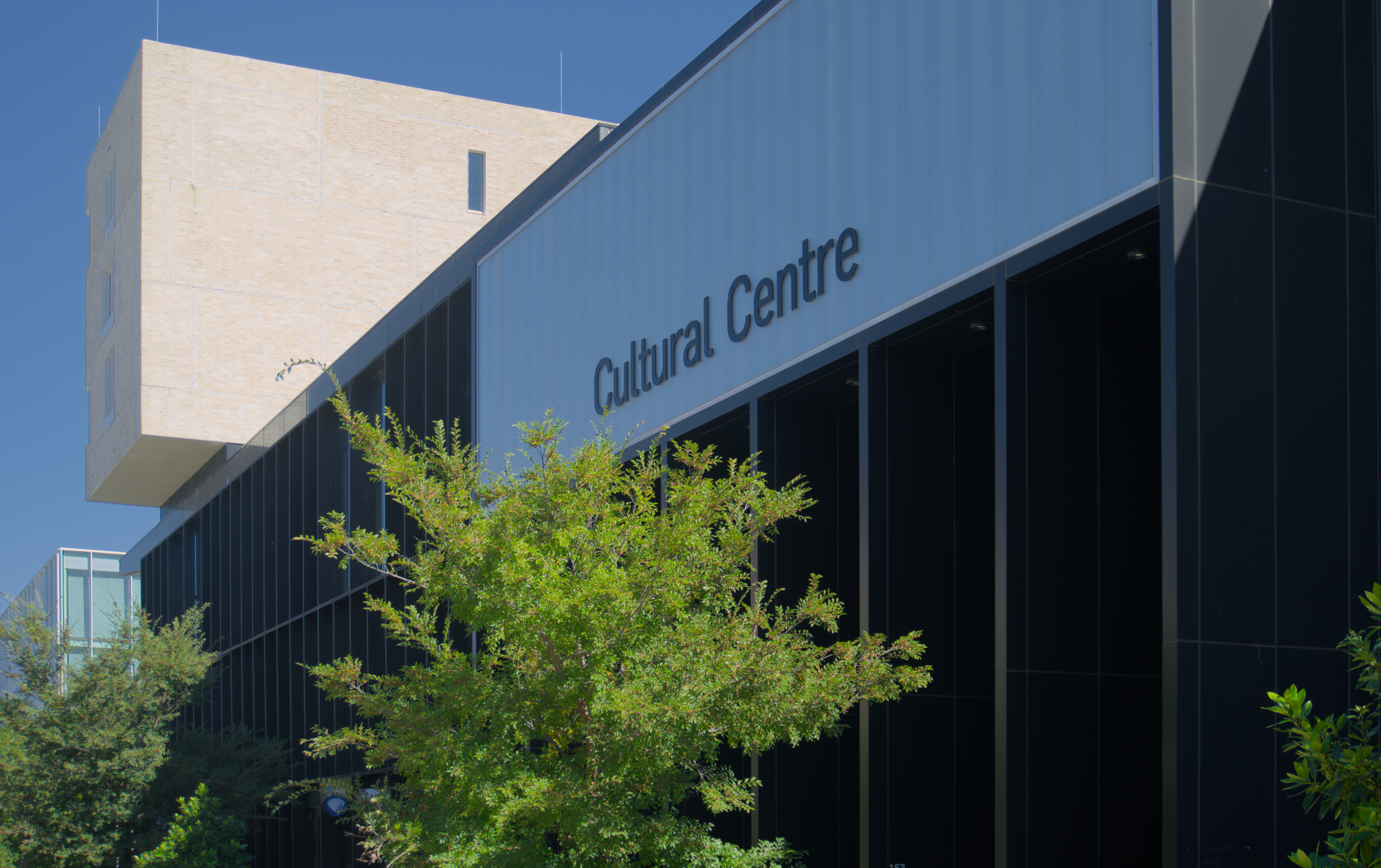
Side of the Kambri Cultural Centre, The Australian National University, Canberra.

The main campus of ANU extends across the Canberra suburb of Acton, which consists of 358 acres (1.45 km^{2}) of mostly parkland with university buildings landscaped within. ANU is roughly bisected by Sullivans Creek, part of the Murray–Darling basin, and is bordered by the native bushland of Black Mountain, Lake Burley Griffin, the suburb of Turner and the Canberra central business district. The Acton campus is also home to three sports fields (South Oval, Fellows Oval and Willows Oval), six tennis courts (home to the ANU Tennis Club), two gymnasiums and a pool. Many university sites are of historical significance dating from the establishment of the national capital, with over 40 buildings recognised by the Commonwealth Heritage List and several others on local lists.

With over 10,000 trees on its campus, ANU won an International Sustainable Campus Network Award in 2009 and was ranked the 2nd greenest university campus in Australia in 2011.

Four of Australia's five learned societies are based at ANU—the Australian Academy of Science, the Australian Academy of the Humanities, the Academy of the Social Sciences in Australia and the Australian Academy of Law. The Australian National Centre for the Public Awareness of Science and the National Film and Sound Archive are also located at ANU, while the National Museum of Australia and CSIRO are situated next to the campus.

ANU occupies additional locations including Mount Stromlo Observatory on the outskirts of Canberra, Siding Spring Observatory near Coonabarabran, a campus at Kioloa on the South Coast of New South Wales and a research unit in Darwin.

=== Drill Hall Gallery ===
The Drill Hall Gallery is housed a drill hall dating from the 1940s, for use in training soldiers for the Second World War, and as base for 3rd Battalion, Werriwa Regiment. The interior was remodelled to create an art gallery in 1984, and in 2004 the building was heritage-listed. Temporary exhibitions of the national collection were held in the hall while the National Gallery of Australia was being built. ANU took over the hall in 1992 to exhibit its own collection of artworks, and also as a venue for temporary exhibitions.

There are four separate exhibition spaces, which provide the venues not only for exhibitions developed by or in collaboration with the university, but also to accompany major conferences and public events. The venue hosts both national and international exhibitions. Sidney Nolan's panorama, Riverbend, which comprises nine panels, is on permanent display at the Drill Hall Gallery.

== Governance and structure ==
=== University Council ===
ANU is governed by a 15-member Council, whose members include the Chancellor and Vice-Chancellor. Gareth Evans, a former Foreign Minister of Australia, was ANU Chancellor from 2010 to December 2019 and Brian Schmidt, an astrophysicist and Nobel Laureate, served as Vice-Chancellor from 1 January 2016 to 1 January 2024. Evans was succeeded as Chancellor by a fellow former Foreign Minister, Julie Bishop, in January 2020. Schmidt was succeeded as Vice-Chancellor by cultural anthropologist and Distinguished Professor Genevieve Bell in January 2024.

=== Finances ===
In late 2024, Vice-Chancellor Genevieve Bell announced "Renew ANU," a $250 million cost-cutting and restructuring program designed to offset severe budgetary deficits and reduce expenditures by 16.5 per cent. The fiscal retrenchment led to widespread staff redundancies, with estimates indicating a net loss of over 1,000 personnel between April 2024 and late 2025. Academic offerings were also heavily impacted, culminating in the closure or downscaling of academic bodies, including the ANU School of Music, the Humanities Research Centre, the Centre for European Studies, and the Australian National Dictionary Centre. Proponents of the strategy maintained that living outside institutional means was unsustainable, but student and faculty unions organized numerous strikes and protests against the dilution of teaching standards. Academic committees received formal evidence that student overcrowding had forced individuals to sit on tutorial floors due to inadequate room allocations.

=== Governance crisis and regulatory intervention ===
The university's operational decline culminated in unprecedented external oversight by federal authorities. Following a 14-month compliance review completed in September 2026, the Tertiary Education Quality and Standards Agency (TEQSA) found that ANU had breached three national higher education standards relating to corporate governance oversight, accountability, risk management, and sustainable operations. The regulator subsequently placed four binding conditions on ANU's registration—making it the only public university in Australia subject to active registration conditions. These mandates forced the university to initiate a Governance and Council Strengthening Programme overseen by independent, TEQSA-approved experts, alongside enforcing mandatory orientation, training, and information-flow reviews for university leadership.

=== Constituent colleges ===
ANU was reorganised in 2006 to create seven Colleges, each of which leads both teaching and research. Additional restructuring occurred in 2017, resulting in changes to the names and schools within the Colleges.

==== Arts, Humanities and Social Sciences ====
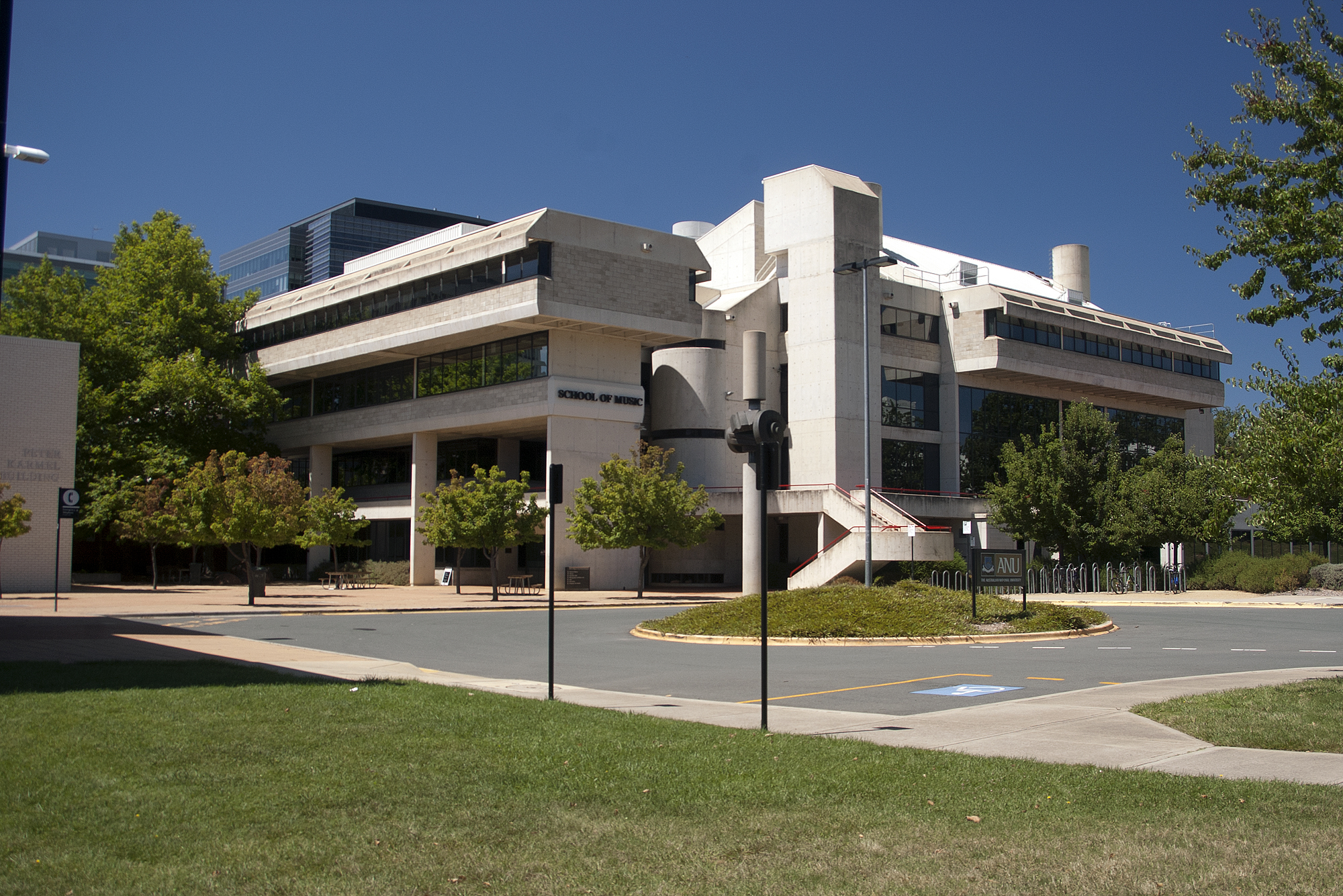
Llewellyn Hall, ANU School of Music

The ANU College of Arts and Social Sciences is divided into the Research School of Social Sciences (RSSS) and Research School of Humanities and the Arts (RSHA). Within RSSS there are schools and centres dedicated to History, Philosophy, Sociology, Politics & International Relations, Demography, Arab and Islamic Studies, and European Studies, as well as the Australian National Centre for Latin and American Studies, Centre for Aboriginal Economic Policy Research, and the ANU Centre for Social Research and Methods.

RSHA contains schools of Archaeology and Anthropology; Art & Design; and Literature, Languages and Linguistics, the latter of which include departments focusing on Linguistics & Applied Linguistics; English, Screen, Drama & Gender Studies; Languages & Cultures, and Classical Studies. RSHA also houses the ANU School of Music. In 2026, ANU ranked 14th in the world for politics, 21st in the world for Social Policy and Administration, and 14th in the world for development studies.

The college is also home to the Australian Studies Institute.

The college's School of Philosophy houses the ANU Centre for Consciousness, ANU Centre for Philosophy of the Sciences, and ANU Centre for Moral, Social and Political Theory, an organisation whose purpose is to "become a world-leading forum for exposition and analysis of the evolution, structure, and implications of our moral, social and political life." Its president is Nicholas Southwood and key people include Seth Lazar and Bob Goodin.

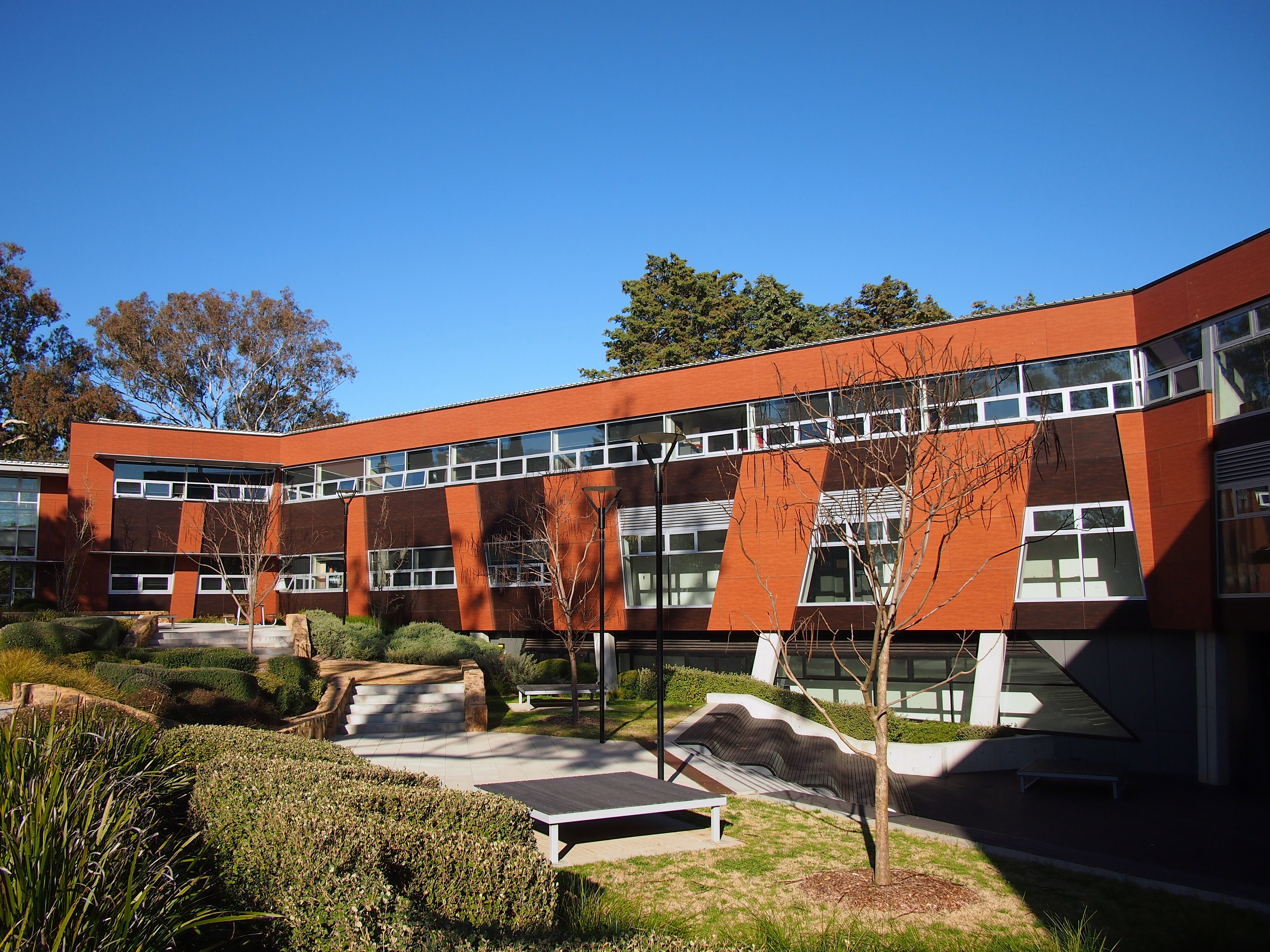
The Crawford School of Public Policy is based at the ANU.

==== Asia and the Pacific ====
The ANU College of Asia and the Pacific is a specialist centre of Asian and Pacific studies and languages, among the largest collections of experts in these fields of any university in the English-speaking world. The college is home to four academic schools: the ANU Crawford School of Public Policy, a research intensive public policy school; the School of Culture, History and Language, for studies of Asia-Pacific people and languages; the Coral Bell School of Asia Pacific Affairs, covering politics and international affairs of Asia and the Pacific; and the School of Regulation and Global Governance (RegNet, formerly the Regulatory Institutions Network), study of regulation and governance.

The college also houses the Australian Centre on China in the World, the Strategic and Defence Studies Centre, and the Council for Security Cooperation in the Asia Pacific, Australia. It has dedicated regional institutes for China, Indonesia, Japan, Korea, Malaysia, Mongolia, Myanmar, the Pacific, Southeast Asia and South Asia. The college hosts a series of annual and biannual updates, on various regions in the Asia-Pacific. The Crawford School of Public Policy houses the Asia Pacific Arndt-Cohen Department of Economics, the Asia Pacific Network for Environmental Governance, the Australia-Japan Research Centre, The Centre for Applied Macroeconomic Analysis, the Centre for Nuclear Non-Proliferation and Disarmament, the East Asian Bureau of Economic Research, the Tax and Transfer Policy Institute, the ANU National Security College, the East Asia Forum publication and a number of other centres. The Crawford School of Public Policy also hosts offices and programs for the Australia and New Zealand School of Government. Many high performing Year in Asia program students gain the opportunity to travel to an Asian country of their choosing to study for one year specializing in one Asian language.

The college also has affiliation with Indiana University's Pan Asia Institute.

==== Business and Economics ====
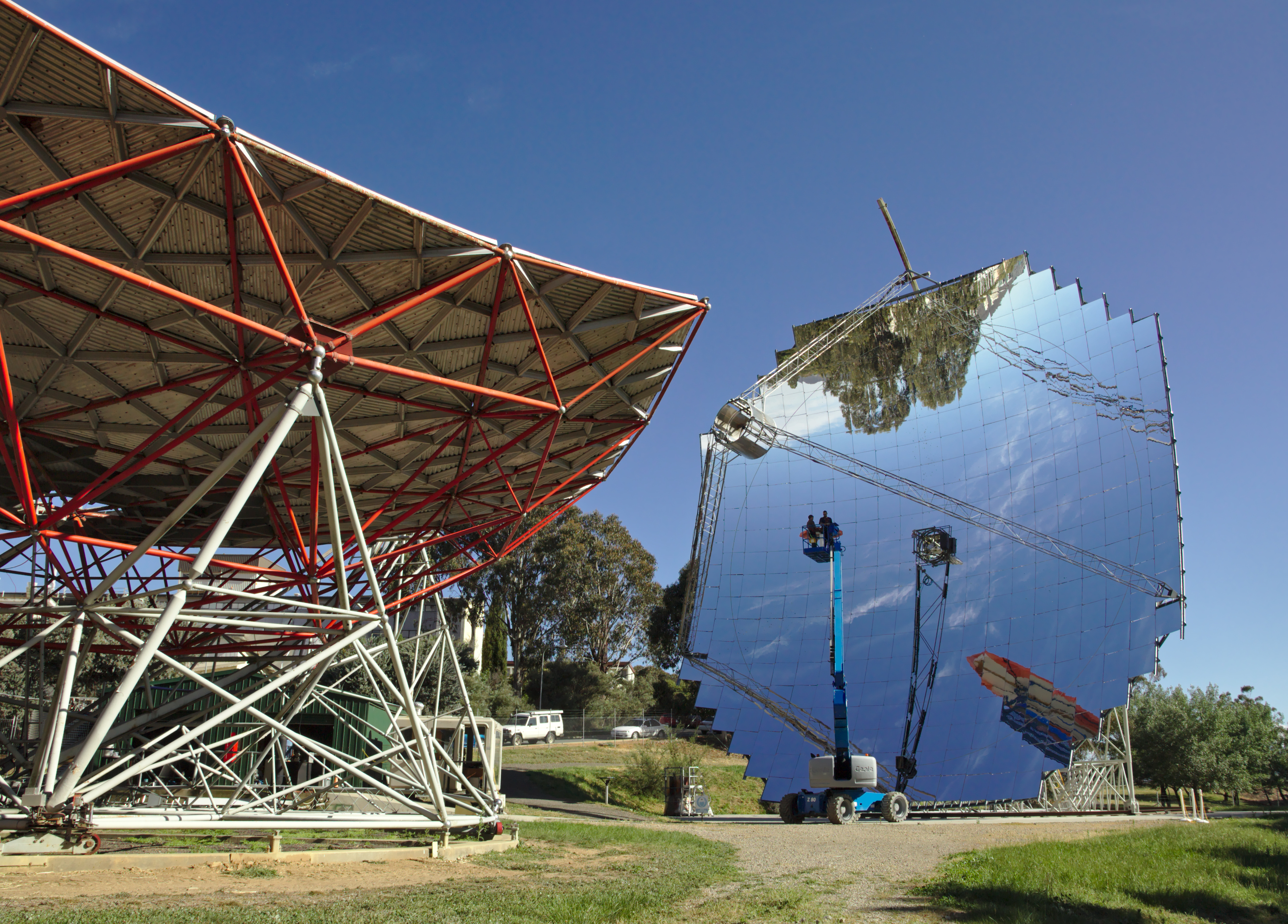
Paraboloidal dish for concentrated solar power at ANU

The ANU College of Business and Economics comprises four schools, which carry research and teaching in economics, finance, accounting, actuarial studies, statistics, information systems, marketing and management:

- Research School of Management
- Research School of Finance, Actuarial Studies and Statistics
- Research School of Accounting
- Research School of Economics

Dedicated research centres within these schools include the Social Policy Evaluation, Analysis and Research Centre; the Australian National Centre for Audit and Assurance Research; the ANU Centre for Economic History; the National Centre for Information Systems Research; and the ANU Centre for Economic Policy Research. The college is professionally accredited with the Institute of Chartered Accountants Australia, CPA Australia, the Australian Computer Society, the Actuaries Institute Australia, the Institute of Public Accountants, the Association of International Accountants, the Chartered Financial Analyst Institute and the Statistical Society of Australia Inc. It also has membership of the World Wide Web Consortium (W3C).

==== Systems and Society ====
The ANU College of Systems and Society brings together critical capabilities in understanding the modern interfaces between systems, technology, processes, the physical world, and the social world. The college comprises six academic units: the Australian National Centre for the Public Awareness of Science, Fenner School of Environment & Society, Mathematical Sciences Institute, School of Computing, School of Cybernetics, and School of Engineering. ANU is home to the National Computational Infrastructure National Facility and was a co-founder of NICTA, the chief information and communications technology research centre in Australia.

Research areas of expertise in the college include: Computing Foundations, Computational Science, Intelligent Systems, Data Science and Analytics, Software Innovation Institute, Cybernetics Education, Cybernetics Futures, Cybernetics Projects, Aerospace Engineering, Energy Engineering, Environmental Engineering, Information and Signals Processing, Mechatronics, Biodiversity and Conservation, Climate and Energy, Food soil water and agriculture, Forests and Fire, Indigenous people and the environment, Integrative methods and application, Urban systems and sustainability, Algebra and Topology, Analysis and Geometry, Applied and Nonlinear Analysis, Bioinformation Science, Computational Mathematics, Fusion plasma theory and modelling, Mathematical Physics, Stochastic analysis and risk modelling, Theoretical astrophysics, Public engagement and informal science, Public Policy and Science Advice, Responsible innovation and emerging technologies, Science media and culture, Theories and frameworks in science communication, and Topics in science communication.

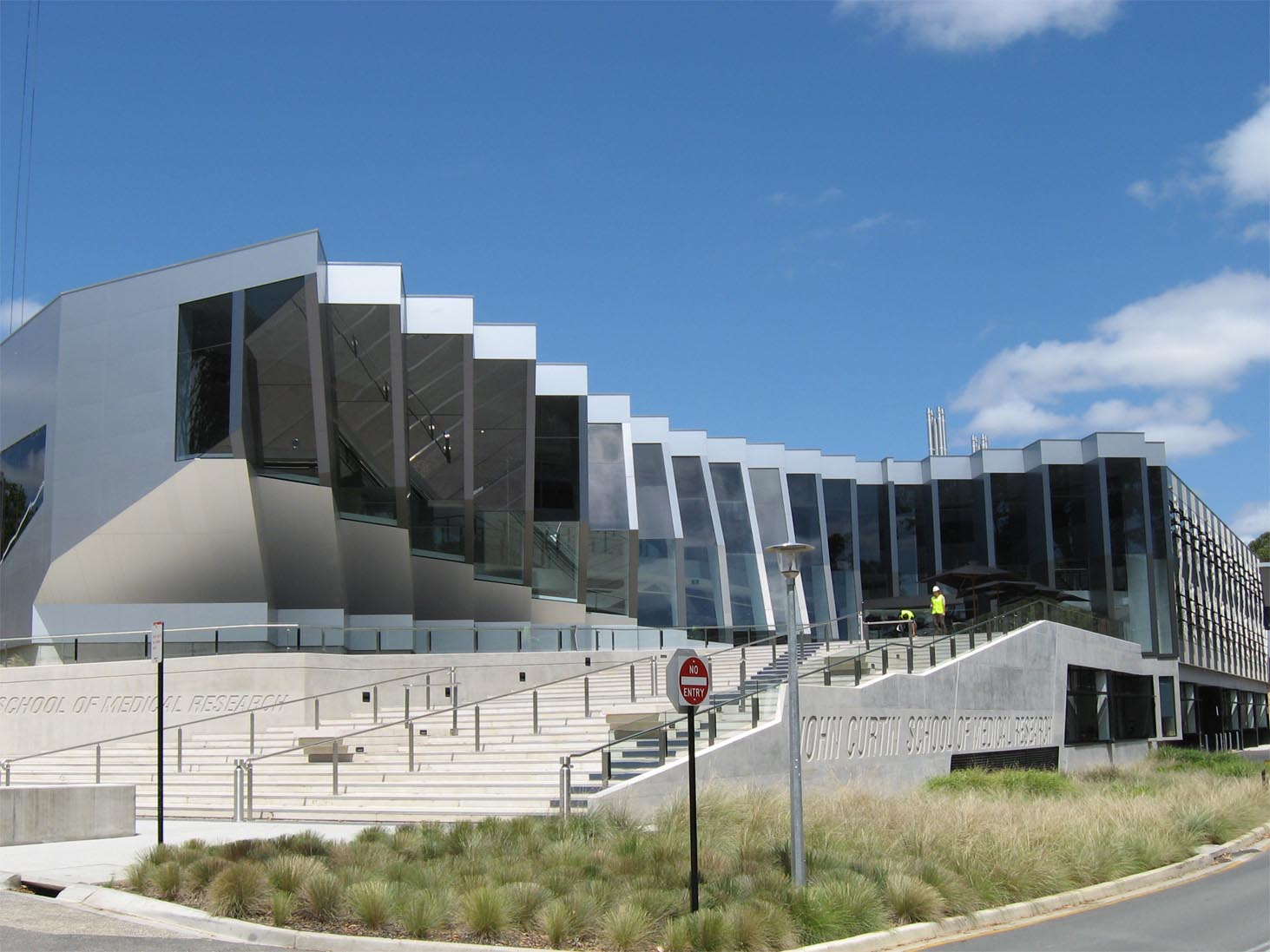
ANU John Curtin School of Medical Research

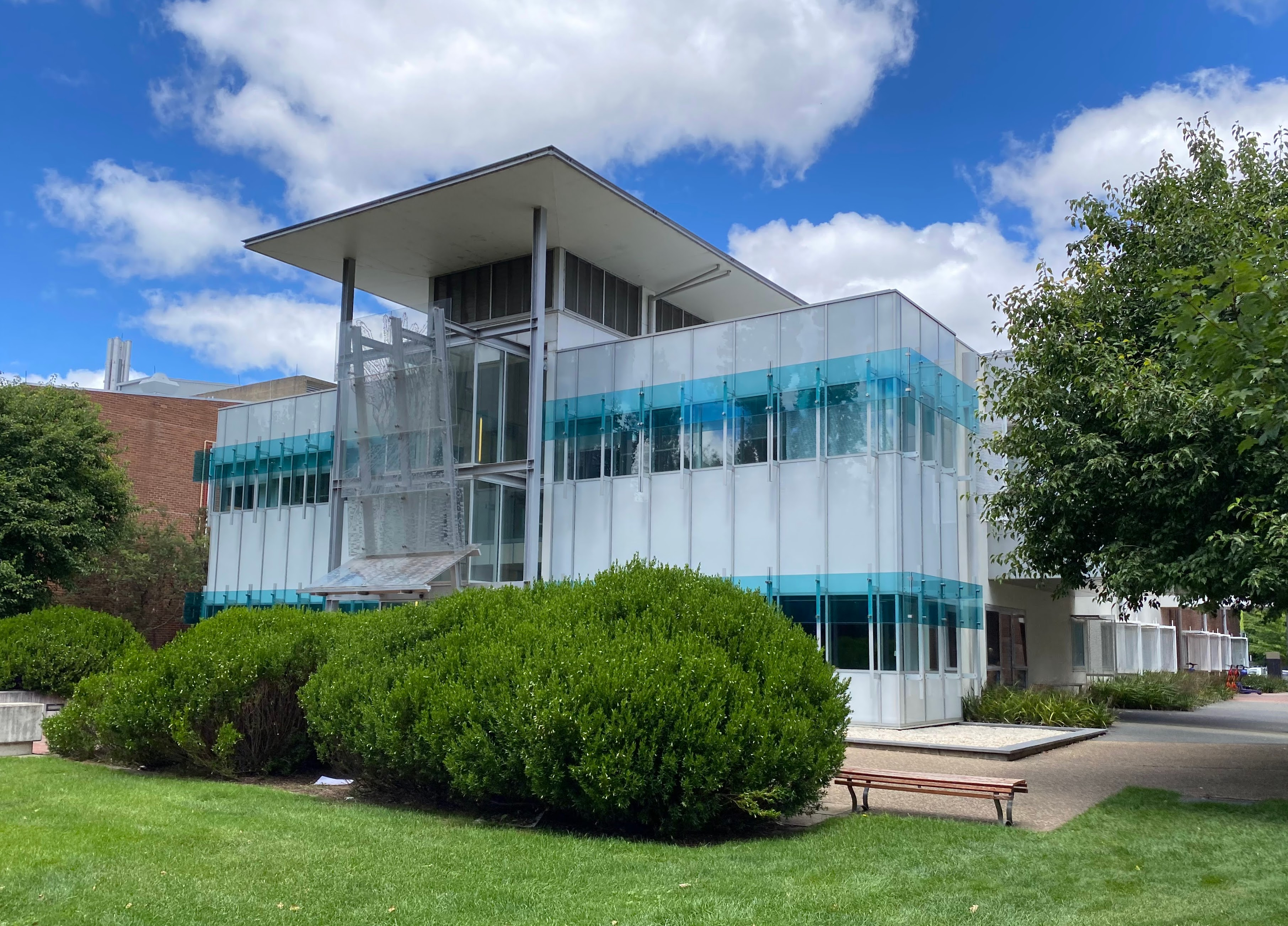
The Peter Baume Building houses the Australian National Centre for the Public Awareness of Science.

==== Law, Governance and Policy ====
The ANU College of Law, Governance and Policy comprises the ANU Law School and ANU School of Legal Practice. The college covers legal research and teaching, with centres dedicated to commercial law, international law, public law and environmental law. In addition to numerous research programs, the college offers the professional LL.B. and J.D. degrees. It is the 7th oldest of Australia's 36 law schools and was ranked 2nd among Australian and 12th among world law schools by the 2018 QS Rankings. Students are given the chance to spend three weeks in Geneva concerning the institutional practice of International Law.

==== Science and Medicine ====
The ANU College of Science and Medicine comprises the Research Schools of Astronomy & Astrophysics, Biology, Chemistry, Earth Sciences, and Physics. Under the direction of Mark Oliphant, nuclear physics was one of the university's early research priorities, leading to the construction of a 500 megajoule homopolar generator and a 7.7 megaelectronvolts cyclotron in the 1950s. These devices were to be used as part of a 10.6 gigaelectronvolt synchrotron particle accelerator that was never completed, however they remained in use for other research purposes. ANU has been home to eight particle accelerators over the years and operates the 14UD and LINAS accelerators. It also built and operated the world's first heliac, SHEILA, and its successor, the Australian national fusion facility H-1NF. Brian Schmidt (astrophysicist at Mount Stromlo Observatory) received the 2011 Nobel Prize for Physics for his work on the accelerating expansion of the universe.

The ANU College of Science & Medicine encompasses the John Curtin School of Medical Research (JCSMR), ANU Medical School, National Centre for Epidemiology and Population Health, and Research School of Psychology. JCSMR was established in 1948 as a result of the vision of Nobel laureate Howard Florey. Three further Nobel Prizes have been won as a result of research at JCSMR—in 1963 by John Eccles and in 1996 by Peter Doherty and Rolf M. Zinkernagel.

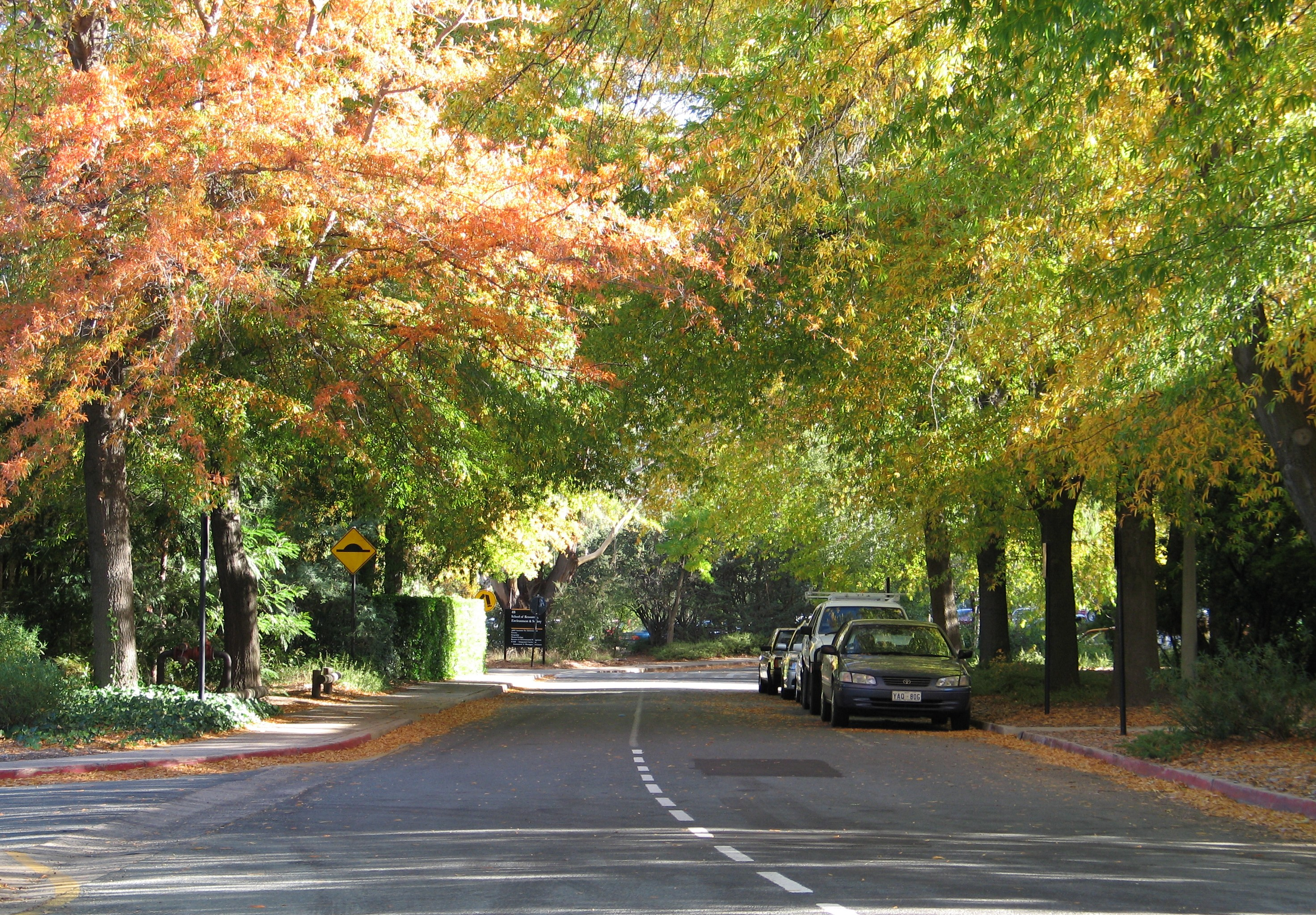
Linnaeus Way at ANU

=== Endowment ===
At the end of 2018, ANU recorded an endowment of A$1.8 billion.

== Academic profile ==
ANU is a member of the Group of Eight, Association of Pacific Rim Universities, the International Alliance of Research Universities, UNESCO Chairs, U7 Alliance, Winter Institute. and Global Scholars Program.

ANU participates in the US Financial Direct Loan program. The RG Menzies Scholarship to Harvard University is awarded annually to at least one talented Australian who has gained admission to a Harvard graduate school. ANU and University of Melbourne are the only two Australian partner universities of Yale University's Fox Fellowship program. ANU has exchange partnership with Yale University, Brown University, MIT and Oxford University, and ANU has a research partnership with Harvard University.

=== Libraries and archives ===
The library of ANU originated in 1948 with the appointment of the first librarian, Arthur McDonald. The library holds over 2.5 million physical volumes distributed across six branches—the Chifley, Menzies, Hancock, Art & Music, and Law Libraries and the external Print Repository. Chifley and Hancock libraries are both accessible for ANU staff and students 24 hours a day.

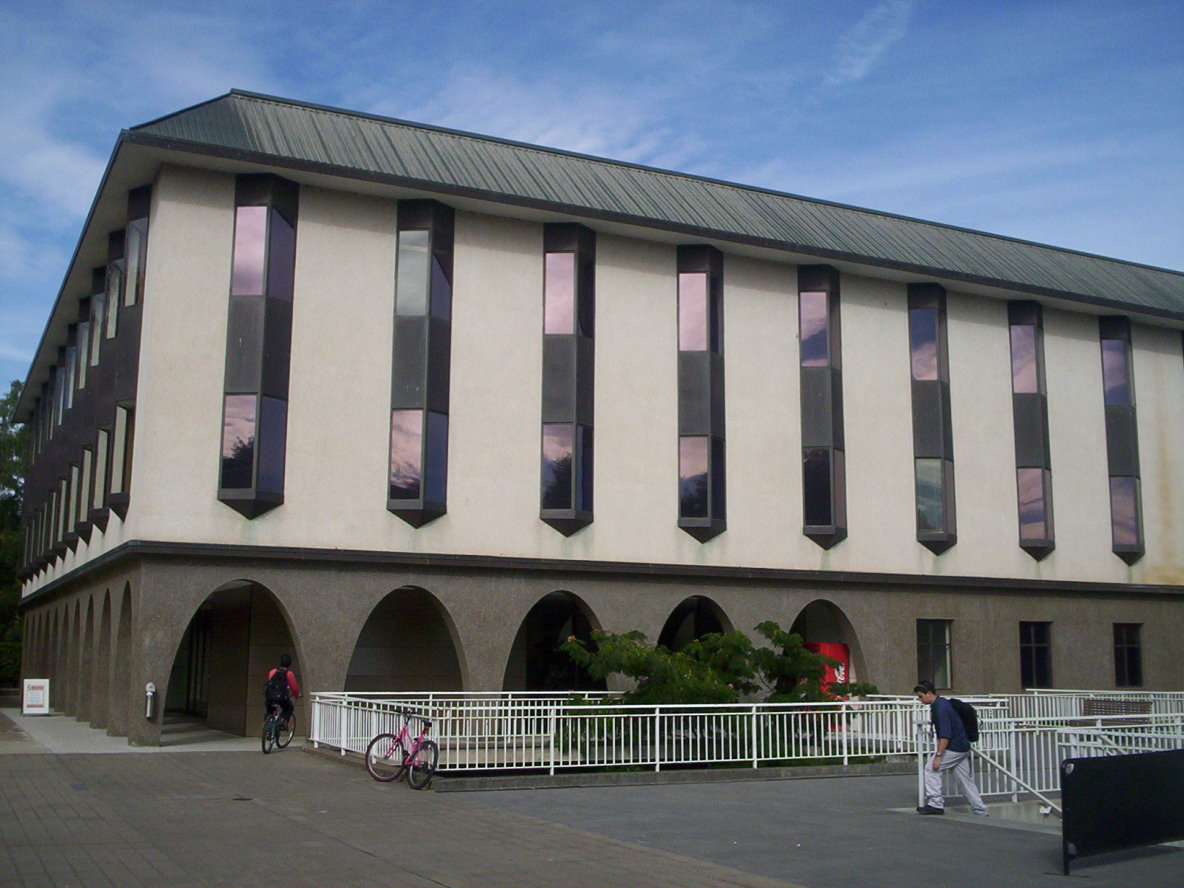
Chifley Library

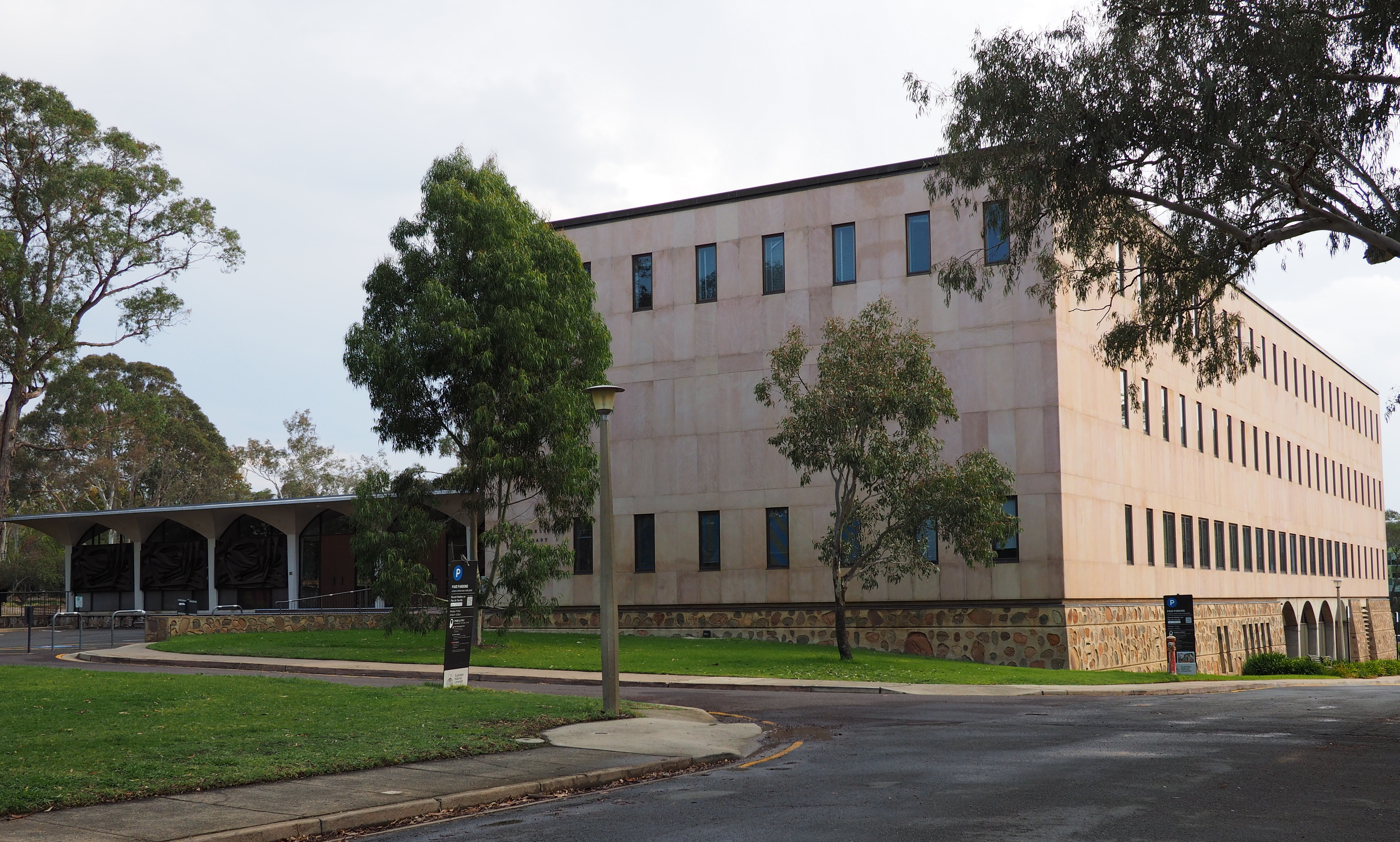
Menzies Library

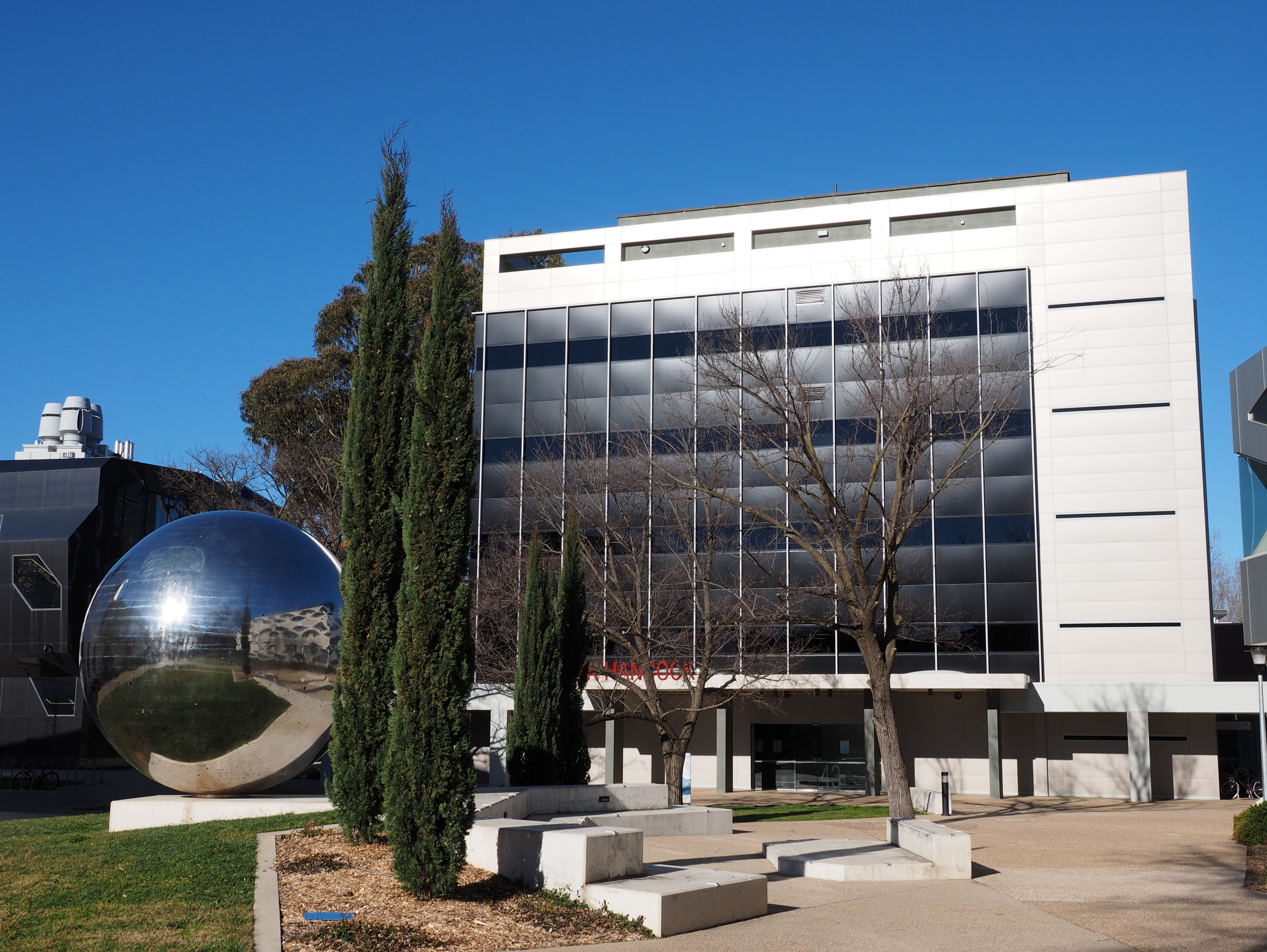
Hancock Library

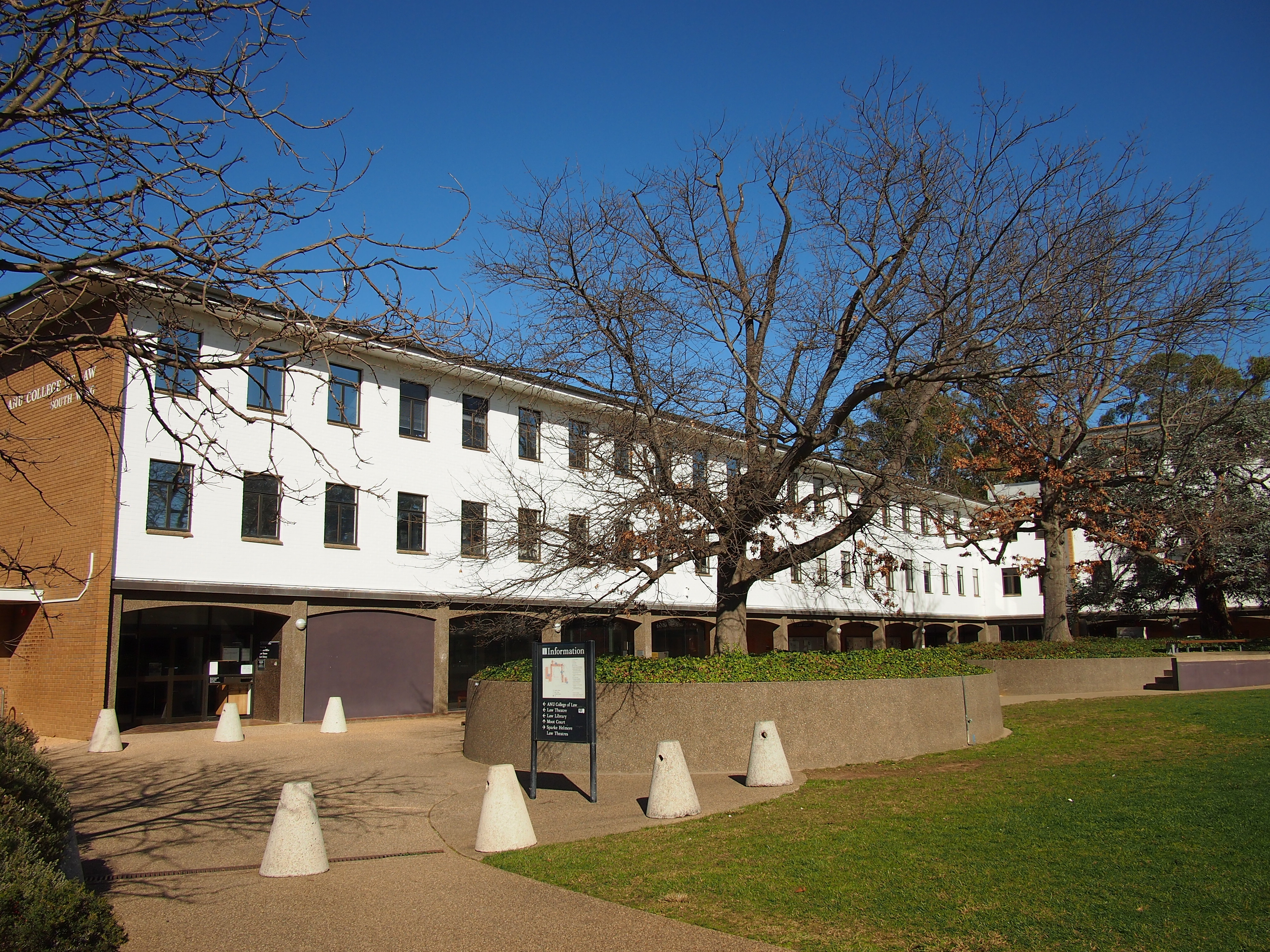
Law Library contained within the ANU College of Law

=== Tuition, loans and financial aid ===
For international students starting in 2025, tuition fees ranged from A$33,600 to over A$100,000 per academic year for award programs lasting at least one year. Domestic students (Note: According to the Higher Education Support Act 2003, domestic students include permanent residents and New Zealand citizens in addition to Australian citizens.) may be offered a federally-subsidised Commonwealth Supported Place (CSP) which substantially decreases the amount billed to the student. The maximum student contribution amount limits that can be applied to CSP students are dependent on the field of study.

Since 2021, Commonwealth Supported Places have also been limited to 7 years of equivalent full-time study load (EFTSL), calculated in the form of Student Learning Entitlement (SLE). Students may accrue additional SLE under some circumstances (e.g., starting a separate one-year honours program) or every 10 years. Domestic students are also able to access the HECS-HELP student loans scheme offered by the federal government. These are indexed to the Consumer or Wage Price Index, whichever is lower, and repayments are voluntary unless the recipient passes an income threshold.

The university also offers scholarships, which come in the form of bursaries or tuition fee remission.

=== Academic reputation ===
University rankings

Global – Overall
- ARWU World: 101–150 (2025)
- CWTS World: 298 (Note: The CWTS Leiden Ranking is based on P (top 10%).) (2025)
- QS World: =29 (2027)
- QS Employability: 79 (2022)
- THE World: =77 (2027)
- THE Reputation: 86 (2025)
- USNWR Global: 81 (26/27)

National – Overall
- ARWU National: 6–7 (2025)
- CWTS National: 10 (2024)
- ERA National: 6 (2018)
- QS National: 4 (2026)
- THE National: 6 (2027)
- USNWR National: 6 (26/27)
- AFR National: 5 (2025)

In the 2024 Aggregate Ranking of Top Universities, which measures aggregate performance across the QS, THE and ARWU rankings, the university attained a position of #57 (6th nationally).

Following a period of severe internal operational changes, staff redundancies, and budgetary restructuring, ANU experienced a decline in its global standing. In the 2027 edition of the Times Higher Education World University Rankings, the university dropped to a record low 77th place globally. This marked the lowest position the university had ever recorded since the ranking system's inception, representing a slide from its peak global position of 47th in 2017.

National publications

In the Australian Financial Review Best Universities Ranking 2025, the university was ranked No. 5 amongst Australian universities.

Global publications

In the 2026 Quacquarelli Symonds World University Rankings (published 2025), the university was ranked of #32 (4th nationally).

In the Times Higher Education World University Rankings 2027 (published 2026), the university was ranked #77 (5th nationally).

In the 2025 Academic Ranking of World Universities, the university was ranked #101–150 (tied 6–7th nationally).

In the 2025–2026 U.S. News & World Report Best Global Universities, the university was ranked #86 (7th nationally).

In the CWTS Leiden Ranking 2025, the university was ranked #298 (10th nationally).

=== Student outcomes ===
The Australian Government's QILT (Note: Abbreviation for Quality Indicators for Learning and Teaching.) conducts national surveys documenting the student life cycle from enrolment through to employment. These surveys place more emphasis on criteria such as student experience, graduate outcomes and employer satisfaction than perceived reputation, research output and citation counts.

In the 2023 Employer Satisfaction Survey, graduates of the university had an overall employer satisfaction rate of 84.2%.

In the 2023 Graduate Outcomes Survey, graduates of the university had a full-time employment rate of 80.7% for undergraduates and 88.5% for postgraduates. The initial full-time salary was A$72,000 for undergraduates and A$96,400 for postgraduates.

In the 2023 Student Experience Survey, undergraduates at the university rated the quality of their entire educational experience at 79.4% meanwhile postgraduates rated their overall education experience at 72.5%.

In the 2025 Graduate Outcomes Survey, recent graduates of the university recorded a full-time employment rate of 75.4% for undergraduates, down over 5% from two years prior. Across the wider sector, undergraduate overall satisfaction with their qualifications reached a historical series low of 74.9% during this evaluation period amid structural shifts and operational adjustments.

The student culture at the university underwent a shift following changes in the mid-2020s. Student surveys and institutional critiques highlighted an increasing sense of atomization and dissatisfaction within the student body, which critics attributed to broader operational pressures and declining campus amenities. Budget cuts led to overcrowded classrooms, with an Education and Employment Committee inquiry hearing evidence that students were forced to sit on classroom floors. In late 2026, the administration announced above-inflation increases to residential rents for the 2027 academic year, affecting undergraduate halls such as Burton & Garran Hall, Fenner Hall, and Bruce Hall. This decision drew condemnation from student media and representatives, who noted that the hikes exceeded standard local Consumer Price Index metrics, intensified the financial strain on students, and avoided local rent caps because university residents are classified legally as occupants rather than as tenants under the Residential Tenancies Act.

== Student life ==
=== Student associations ===
==== Australian National University Students' Association ====
Australian National University Students' Association (ANUSA) is the students' union of the Australian National University and acts as a representative body for the undergraduate, postgraduate and research students.

The association faced scrutiny in May 2024 after a volatile online Annual General Meeting to debate the university's pro-Palestine encampments and the safety of Jewish students on campus. During the proceedings, video captured one student performing a Nazi salute, and another mimicking a Hitler mustache. The union's handling of the fallout drew sharp condemnation at a subsequent federal parliamentary inquiry into antisemitism on university campuses, where it was revealed that the university's internal disciplinary investigation concluded no incident had taken place. Inquiry chair and Labor MP Josh Burns expressed disbelief at the institutional denial, stating he was "completely astounded" by the findings and declaring that "there is no such thing as a superficial Nazi salute". Incoming ANUSA President Will Burfoot conceded the failure to ensure basic meeting safety, promising "additional measures this year to ensure our meetings remain safe."

Political tensions escalated in February 2025 when an audit revealed that ANUSA Environment Department officers misappropriated $6,000 in student fees for external political conferences. Proposed financial oversight reforms were defeated by activist factions who said they were an attack on independent student activism.

The 2026 election cycle further deteriorated amid personal harassment and misogynistic poster defacement. Presidential candidate Leila Clarke described the defacement as a reflection of a toxic campus-wide culture.

==== Australian National University Union ====
The Australian National University Union was previously another student association that managed catering, retail outlets and other amenities on behalf of students. It suffered a complete loss of operational utility following commercial redevelopments within the campus's central Union Court. After the demolition of its building and the permanent closure of the ANU Bar, the union experienced complete financial and structural insolvency, resulting in it being formally wound up and permanently dissolved.

=== Student media ===
==== Woroni ====
Woroni is a student publication at Australian National University. It was first published on 23 May 1947 under the title Student Notes: Canberra University College Students Association. On 14 February 1950, the name was changed to Woroni, which is derived from an Indigenous Australian word meaning "mouthpiece". Woroni is published bi-monthly in full colour magazine format, and features local news and opinion.

The magazine was originally published by the school's student association. An independent student organization called ANU Student Media was incorporated in October 2010, and has operated Woroni ever since. In 2012, an online radio station called Woroni Radio was launched, and a video production arm called Woroni TV was started in 2017.

This newspaper has been digitised as part of the Australian Newspapers Digitisation Program of the National Library of Australia. As of January 2015, issues dating from 1950 to 2007 are available via Trove. Digital versions of works published since 2011 are uploaded and available in colour on electronic publishing platform issuu.

==== ANU Observer ====
ANU Observer is another of the Australian National University's student news publications. Founded in 2017, ANU Observer is an online news site that covers breaking campus news, student life, student politics, arts and culture, sports, university policy and more. ANU Observer is an ANU student association, meaning all students are members by default (and can attend and vote at General Meetings.) Observer also produces a weekly podcast called Our Experts Have Observed, which can be accessed via Spotify or Apple Podcasts.

=== Residential halls and colleges ===
Eleven on-campus residential halls are affiliated with ANU—Bruce Hall, Burgmann College, Burton & Garran Hall, Fenner Hall, John XXIII College, Ursula Hall, Wamburun Hall, Wright Hall, Yukeembruk Village, Graduate House and Toad Hall. Together these residence accommodate for undergraduate and postgraduate students. Four UniLodge residences are also available to ANU students, situated just off campus—Davey Lodge, Kinloch Lodge, Warrumbul Lodge and Lena Karmel Lodge. In 2010, the non-residential Griffin Hall was established for students living off-campus. Another off-campus student accommodation was launched by UniGardens Pty, University Gardens located in Belconnen. Bruce Hall opened in 1961, and was the first undergraduate hall of residence at the university and the first mixed-gender undergraduate residence in Australia.

In 2014, 2019 and 2020 there were major protests organised by student leaders across all of the ANU's halls of residence against steep rent hikes, neglect of pastoral care support, and repeated failures to address issues relating to sexual assault and sexual harassment. Though supported by a majority of students living on residence, the ANU's response to past protests has been mixed, with many recommendations and requests for student consultations ignored. The outcome of the 2020 protests revolve around demands for stronger SASH policy, accountability surrounding tariff rises, and commitments to adequate pastoral care; the outcome of these protests is as yet unknown. Protests have been held since on the issue, with one high-profile one occurring on the same day as the annual Open Day in 2024.

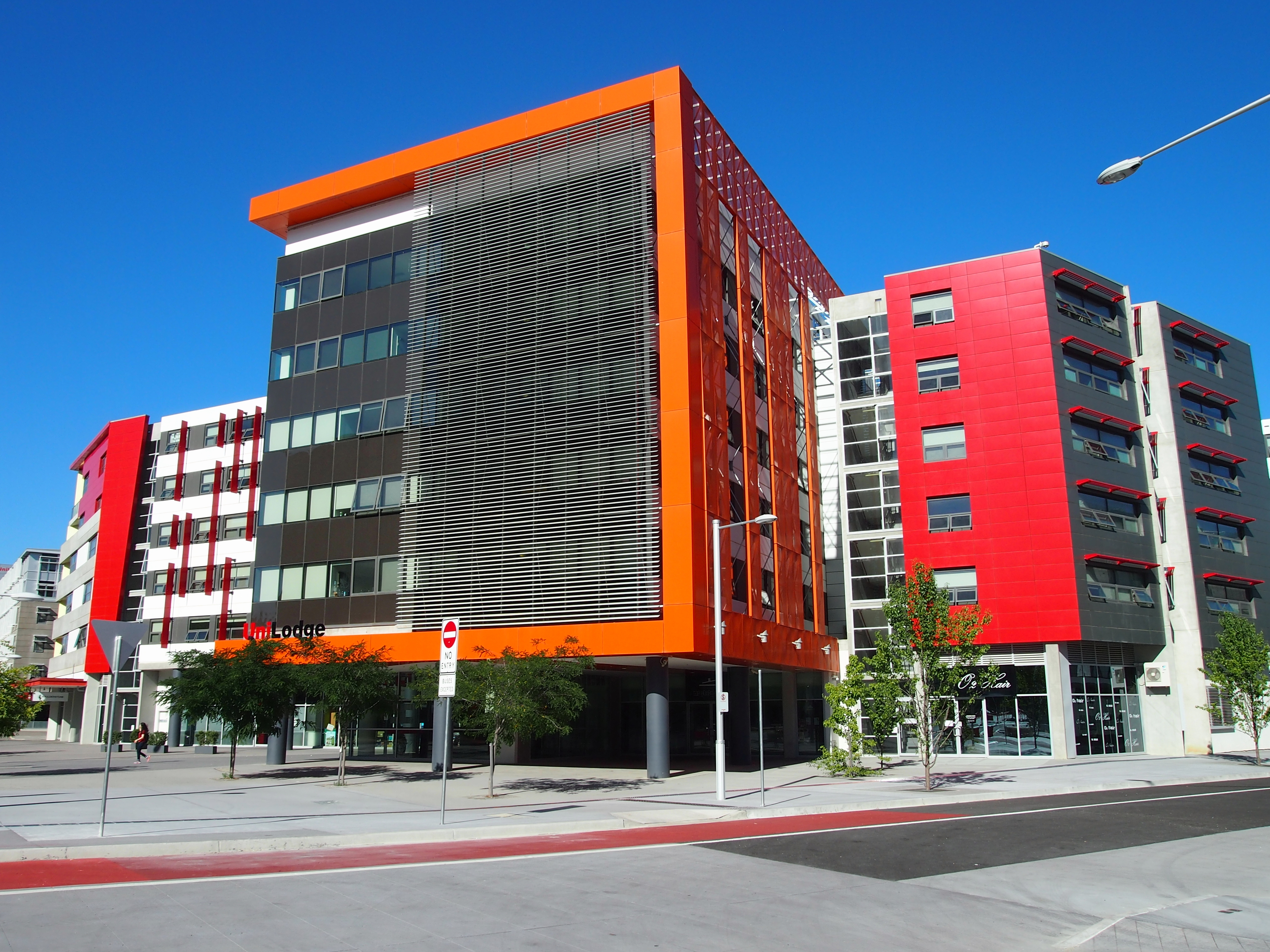
Kinloch Lodge

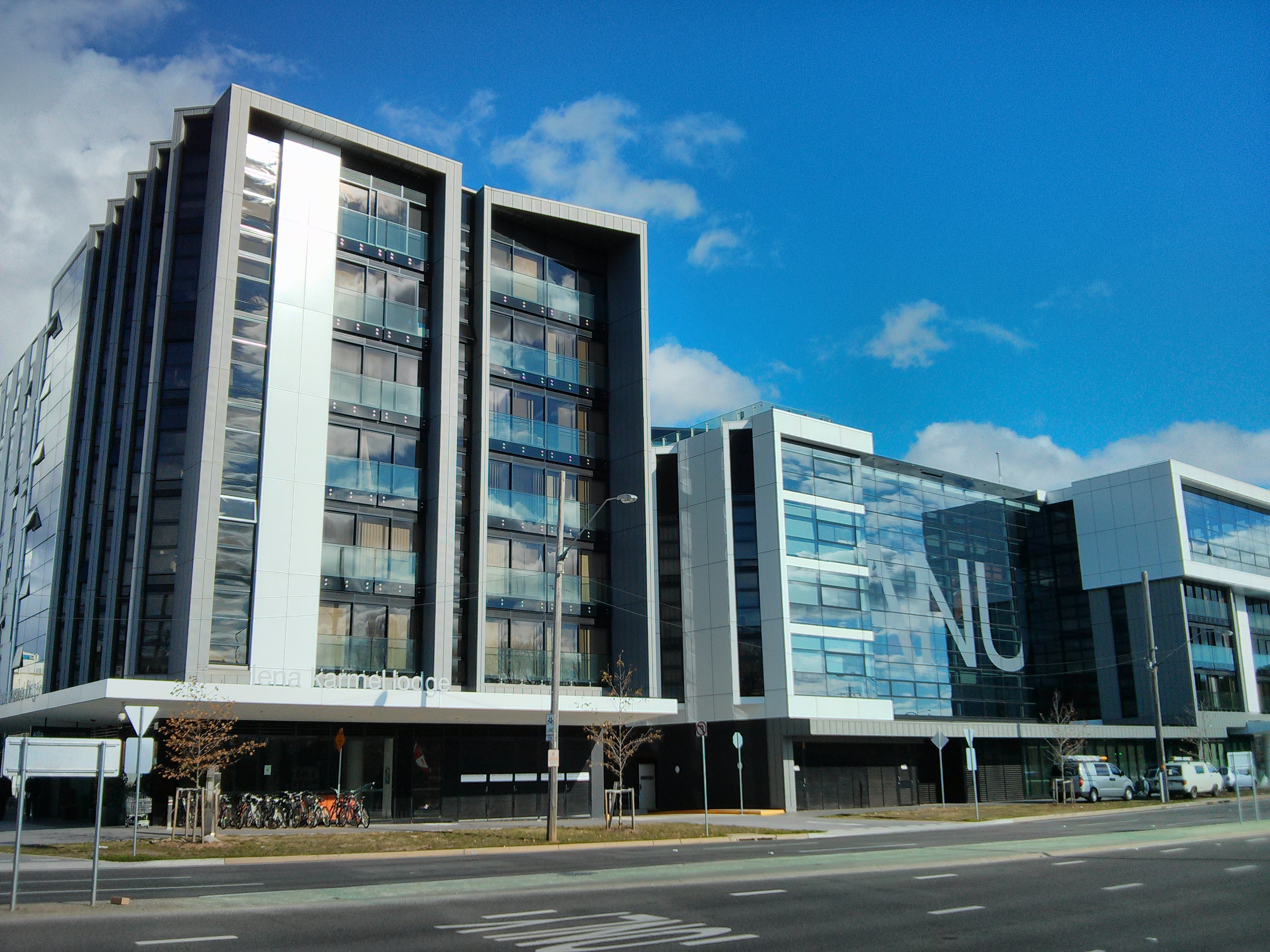
Lena Karmel Lodge

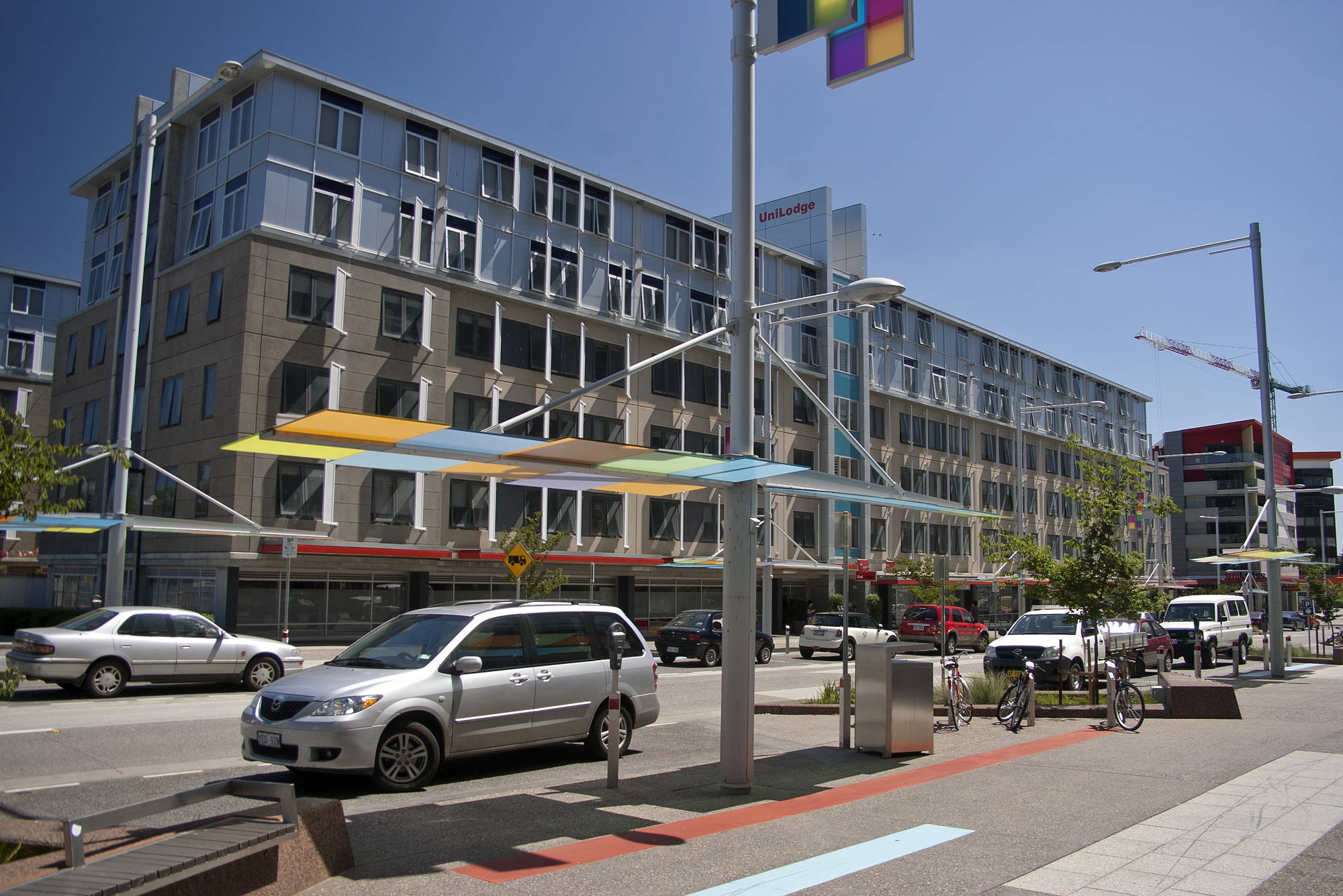
Davey Lodge

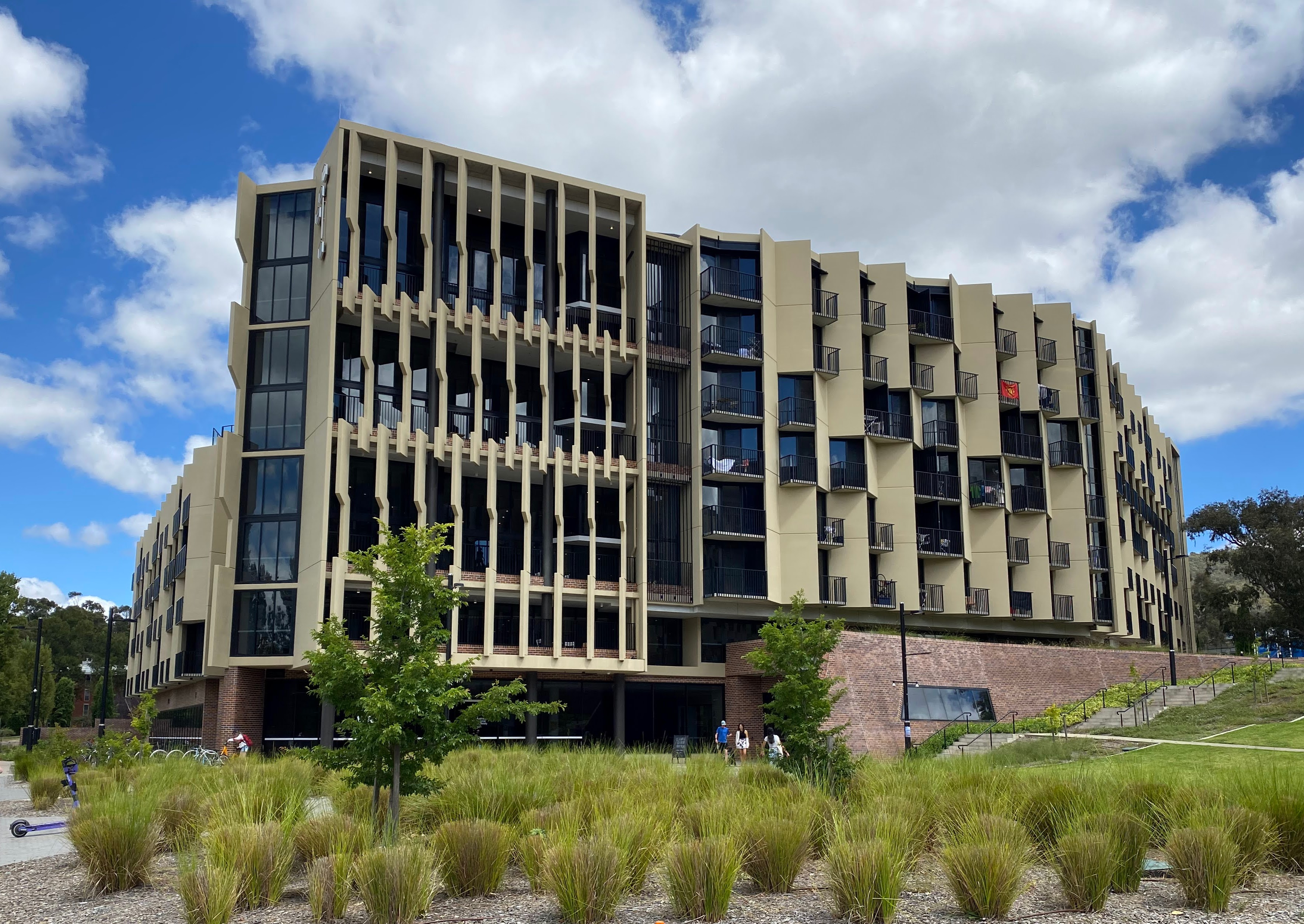
Wright Hall

== Exchange agreements ==
ANU has exchange agreements in place for its students with some foreign universities, most in the Asia-Pacific region, including the National University of Singapore, the University of Tokyo, the University of Hong Kong, Peking University, Tsinghua University and Seoul National University. In other regions,as of 2019 universities include, the George Washington University, the University of California (restricted to inbound), the University of Texas, the University of Toronto in North America and Imperial College London (strictly for earth sciences), King's College London (restricted to inbound), Sciences Po, ETH Zürich, Bocconi University, the University of Copenhagen and Trinity College Dublin in Europe.

== Notable people ==
=== Notable alumni ===
==== Politicians and public servants ====
- Glenys Beauchamp, Department of Industry secretary
- Kim Beazley Sr., Minister for Education
- Don Brash, former governor of the Reserve Bank of New Zealand
- Stephen Conroy, Minister for Broadband, Communications and the Digital Economy
- Gordon de Brouwer, Australian National University Chancellor
- Craig Emerson
- Stephen Gageler, High Court of Australia judge
- Peter Garrett, musician and former politician
- Gary Gray, politician
- Paul Grimes, Department of Agriculture secretary
- Jane Halton, Department of Finance secretary
- Bob Hawke, former Prime Minister of Australia
- Patricia Hewitt, former British Secretary of State for Health
- Chris Higgins, Treasury secretary
- Martin Indyk, Australian-American former US ambassador to Israel
- Michael Keenan, politician
- Catherine King, politician
- Ilaïsaane Lauouvéa, elected member of the Congress of New Caledonia
- Renée Leon, Department of employment secretary
- Gordon Darcy Lilo, former Prime Minister of Solomon Islands
- Joe Ludwig
- Nick Minchin
- Chris Moraitis, Attorney-General's secretary
- Marty Natalegawa, former Indonesian foreign minister
- Geoffrey Nettle, High Court of Australia judge
- Barry O'Farrell
- Annastacia Palaszczuk
- Mari Pangestu, former Minister of Trade in Indonesia
- John Pascoe, Chief Federal Magistrate
- Martin Parkinson, Prime Minister & Cabinet secretary
- Lisa Paul, Department of Education secretary
- Finn Pratt, Department of Social Services secretary
- Kevin Rudd, former Prime Minister of Australia
- Rod Sims, Australian Competition & Consumer Commission chairman
- Warren Snowdon, Prime Minister & Cabinet secretary
- Michael Thawley, Prime Minister & Cabinet secretary
- Damdin Tsogtbaatar, former Minister of Foreign Affairs of Mongolia
- Nick Warner, former Director-General of the Australian Secret Intelligence Service

==== Others ====
- Bettina Arndt, journalist
- Elizabeth Bryan AM, business executive and former CEO of Deutsche Asset Management
- John Bryant, Kellogg's CEO
- John H. Coates, mathematician
- Skaidrīte Darius, folk dancer and computer scientist
- Glyn Davis, University of Melbourne vice-chancellor
- John Deeble, economist
- Peter Drysdale, economist
- Ross Garnaut, economist
- Alan Gilbert, University of Melbourne vice-chancellor
- Stan Grant, political journalist
- Clive Hamilton, intellectual
- John Charles Harsanyi , Hungarian-American economist, recipient of the Nobel Memorial Prize in Economic Sciences in 1994
- Cheong Choong Kong, former Singapore Airlines CEO
- Michael McRobbie, Indiana University president
- Jane Mogina, PhD 2001, biodiversity specialist
- David Morrison, former chief of Army
- John Quiggin, economist
- Lê Viết Quốc, inventor of the doc2vec and seq2seq models in natural language processing, Vietnamese-American computer scientist and a machine learning pioneer at Google Brain
- Jennifer Robinson, human rights lawyer
- Rob Scott, CEO of Wesfarmers, an Australian conglomerate
- Anu Singh, ASU law student convicted of manslaughter
- Andrew Tridgell, computer programmer
- Graham Tuckwell, investor and founder of ETF Securities, an Australian asset management firm
- Tarisi Vunidilo, Fijian archaeologist
Notable alumni of ANU
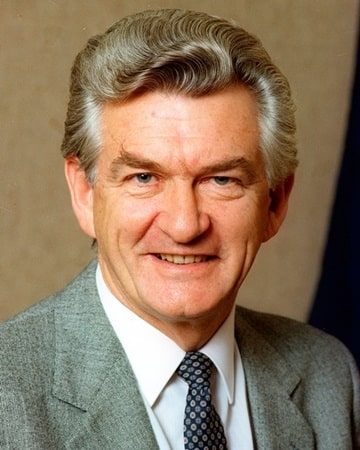
Bob Hawke, 23rd Prime Minister of Australia (1983–1991).

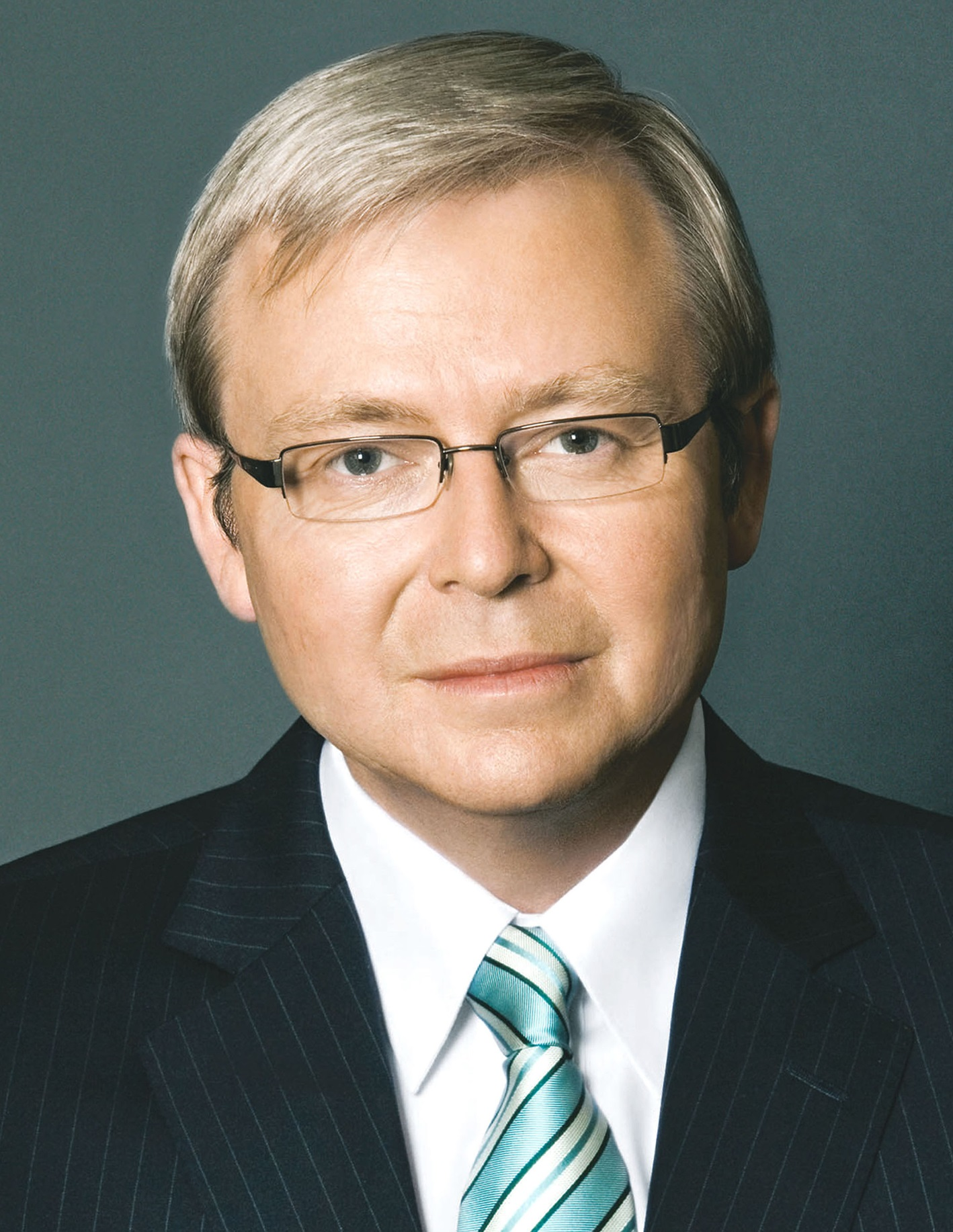
Kevin Rudd, 26th Prime Minister of Australia (2007–2010, 2013).

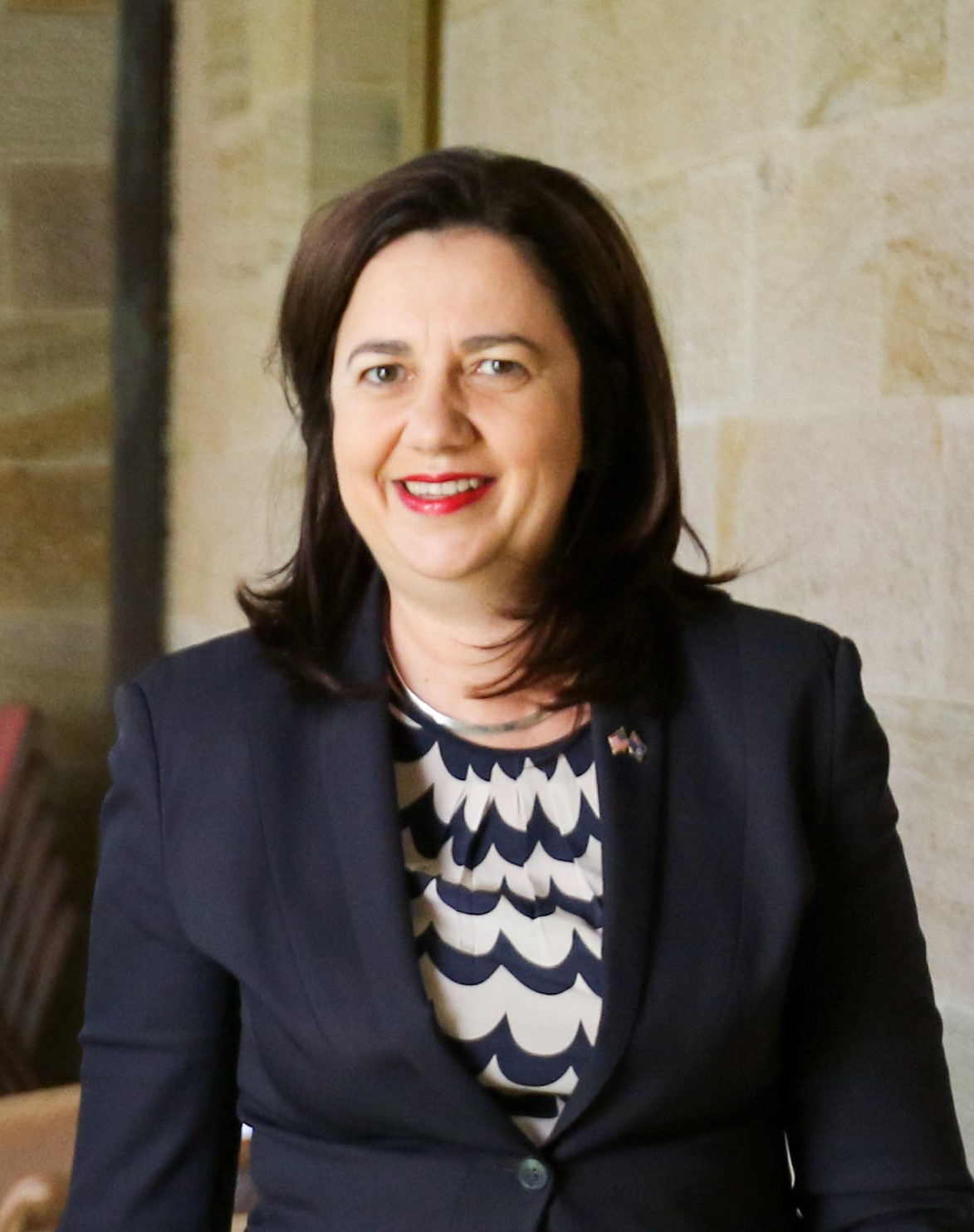
Annastacia Palaszczuk, 39th Premier of Queensland (2015–2023).

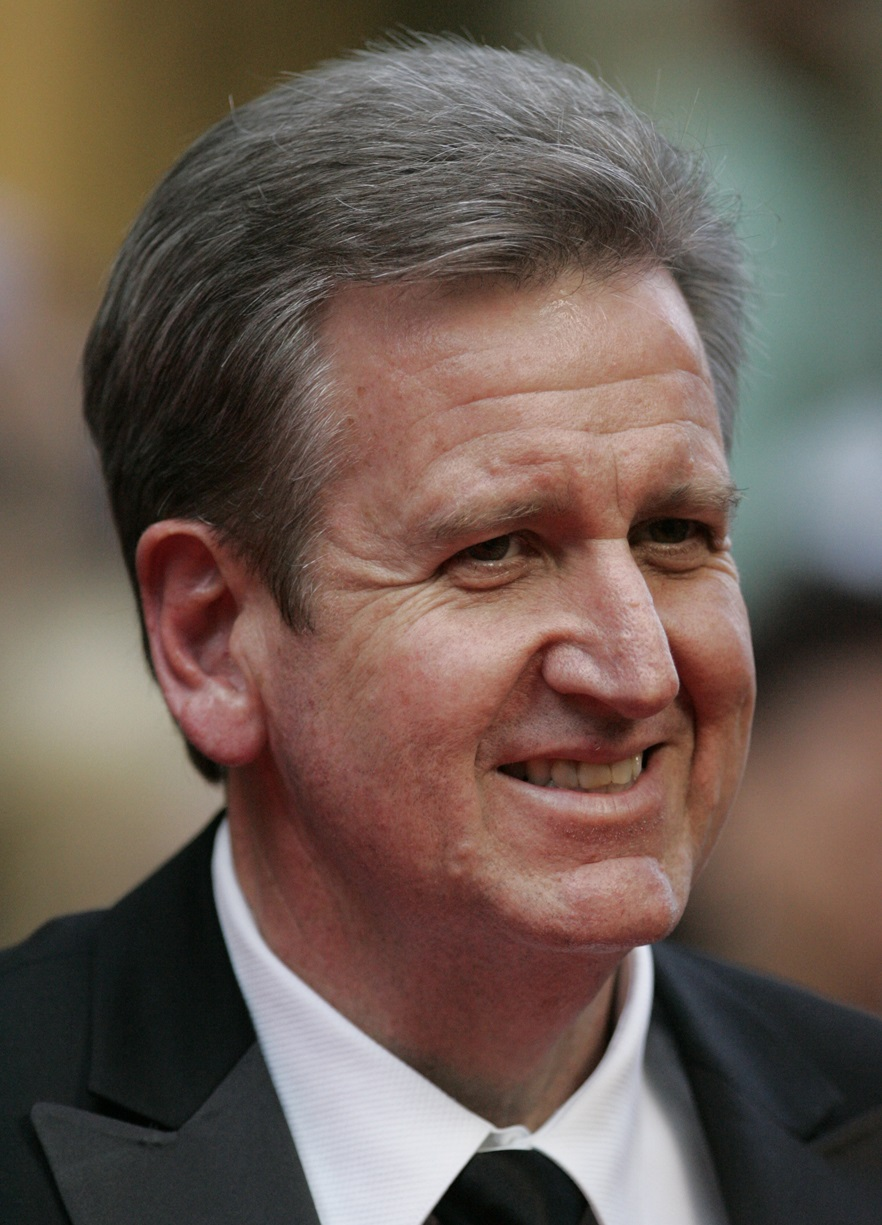
Barry O'Farrell, 43rd Premier of New South Wales (2011–2014).

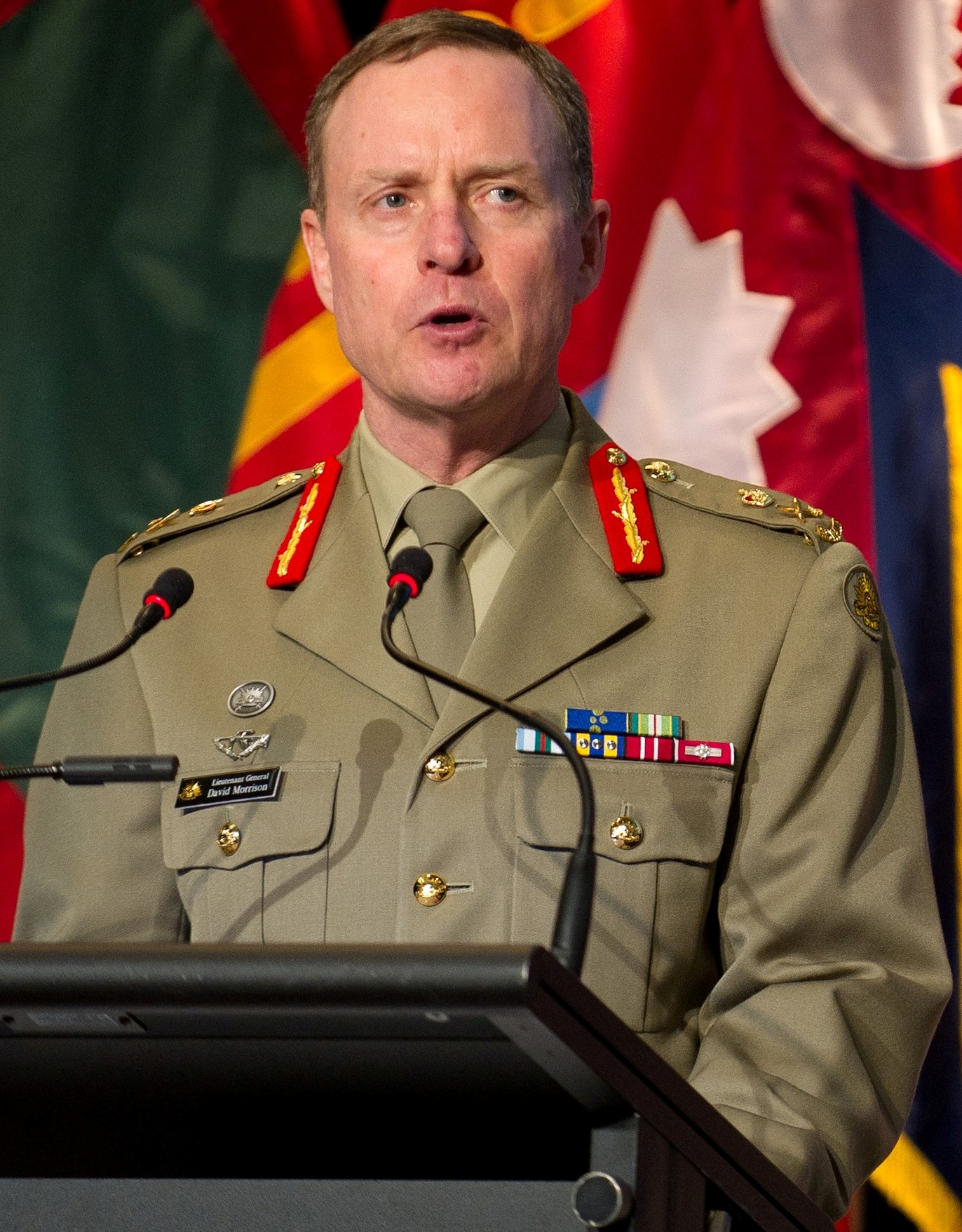
Lt. Gen. David Morrison, Australian Chief of Army (2011–2015).

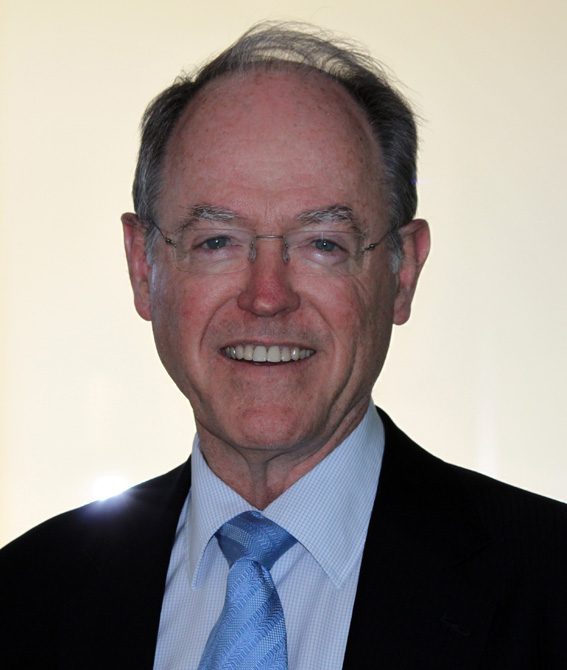
Don Brash, New Zealand Opposition Leader (2003–2006) and Reserve Bank of New Zealand Governor (1988–2002).

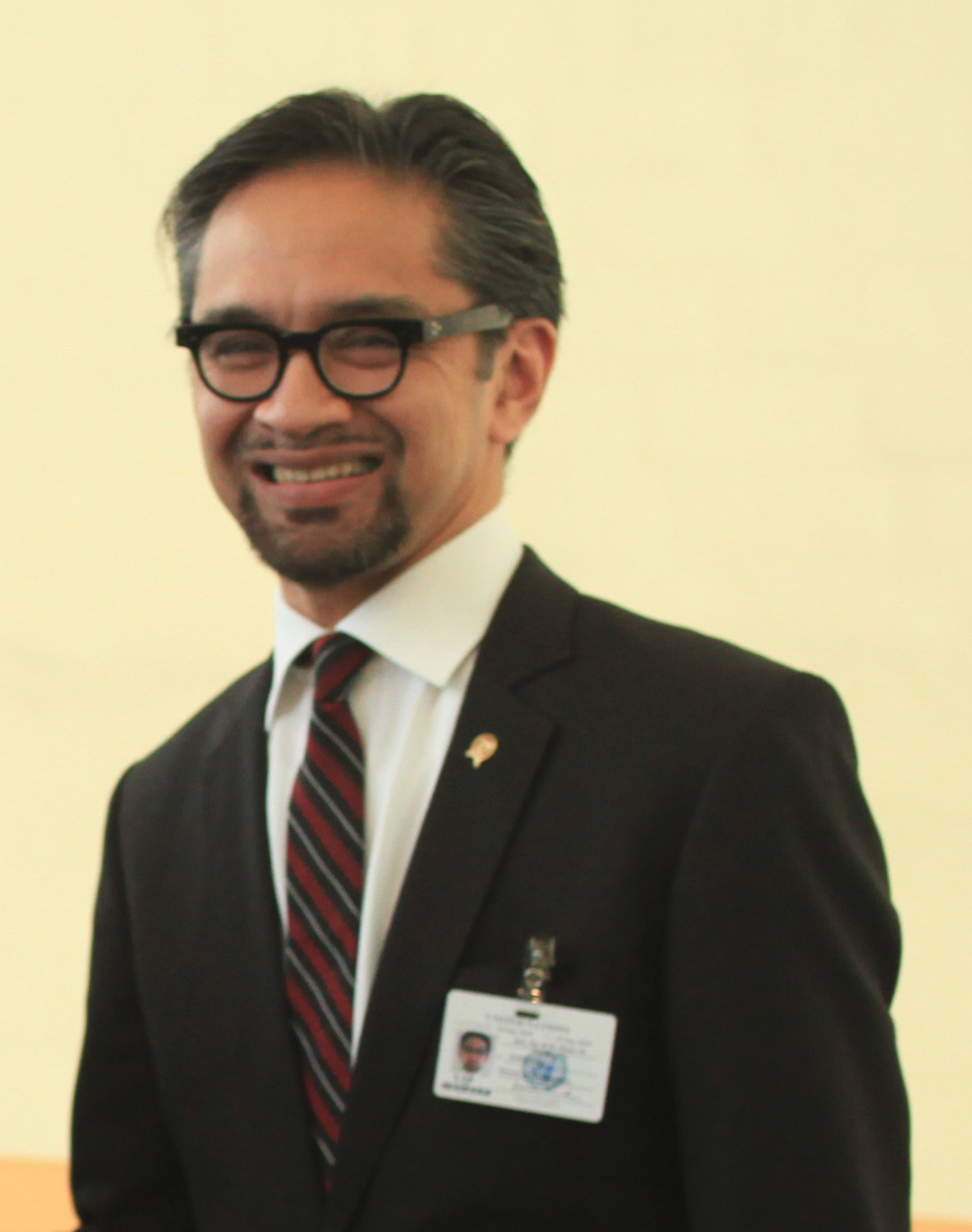
Marty Natalegawa, 16th Foreign Minister of Indonesia (2009–2014).

=== Academics and staff ===
Notable past faculty include Mark Oliphant, Keith Hancock, Manning Clark, Derek Freeman, H. C. Coombs, Gareth Evans, John Crawford, Hedley Bull, Frank Fenner, C. P. Fitzgerald, Pierre Ryckmans, A. L. Basham, Bernhard Neumann, Jeremy Shearmur, and former Indonesian Vice-president Boediono. Nobel Prizes have been awarded to former ANU Chancellor Howard Florey and faculty members John Eccles, John Harsanyi, Rolf M. Zinkernagel, Peter Doherty and Brian Schmidt. Present scholars include Hilary Charlesworth, Ian McAllister, Hugh White, Warwick McKibbin, Keith Dowding, Amin Saikal, and Kenneth Lampl.

Notable past and present staff of ANU
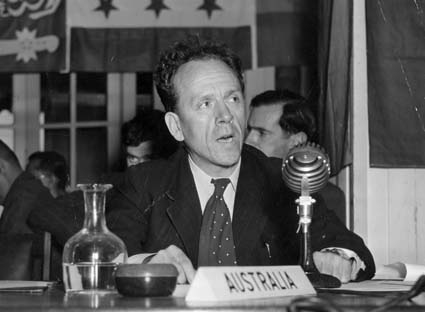
H.C. Coombs, first Governor of the Reserve Bank of Australia.

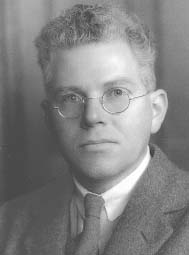
Mark Oliphant, known for the co-discovery of tritium, helium-3 and nuclear fusion.

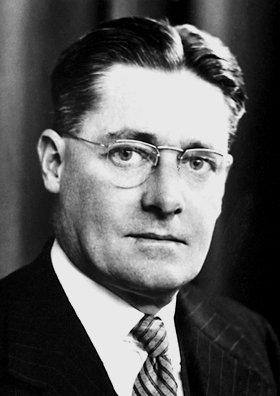
Howard Florey, Nobel Prize in Medicine Laureate (1945) for his role in developing penicillin.

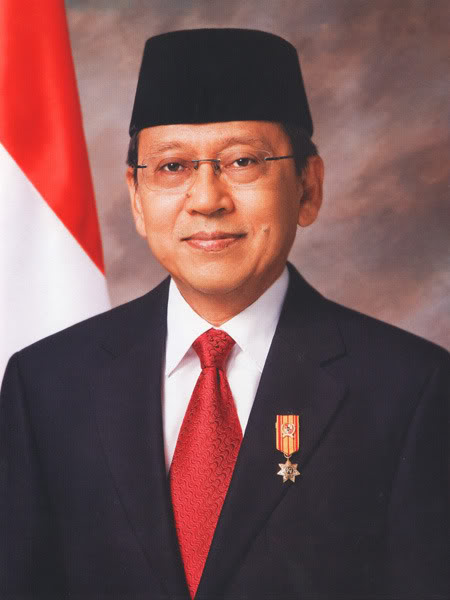
Boediono, Vice President of Indonesia (2009–2014).

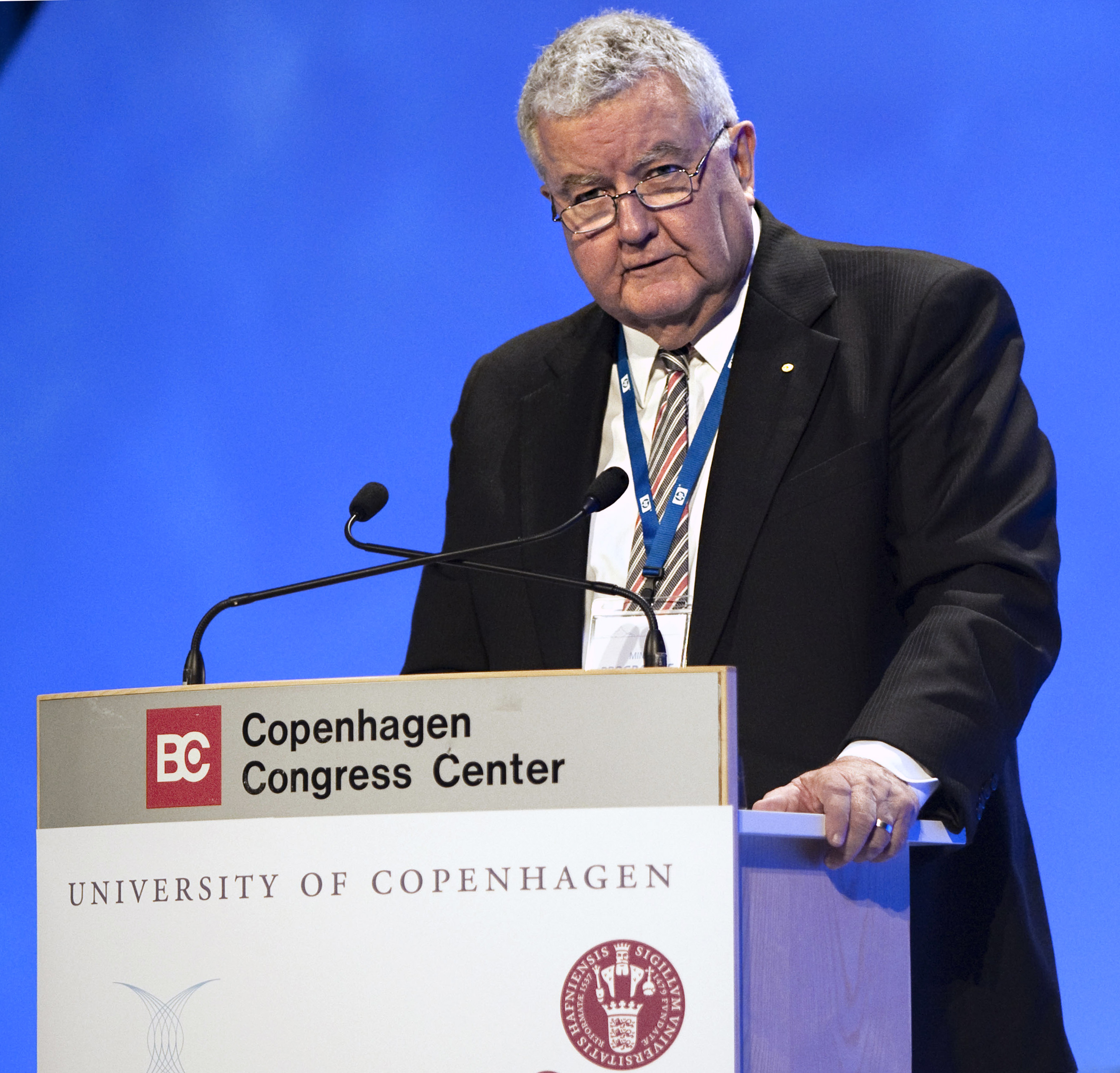
Ian Chubb, Chief Scientist of Australia (2011–2016).

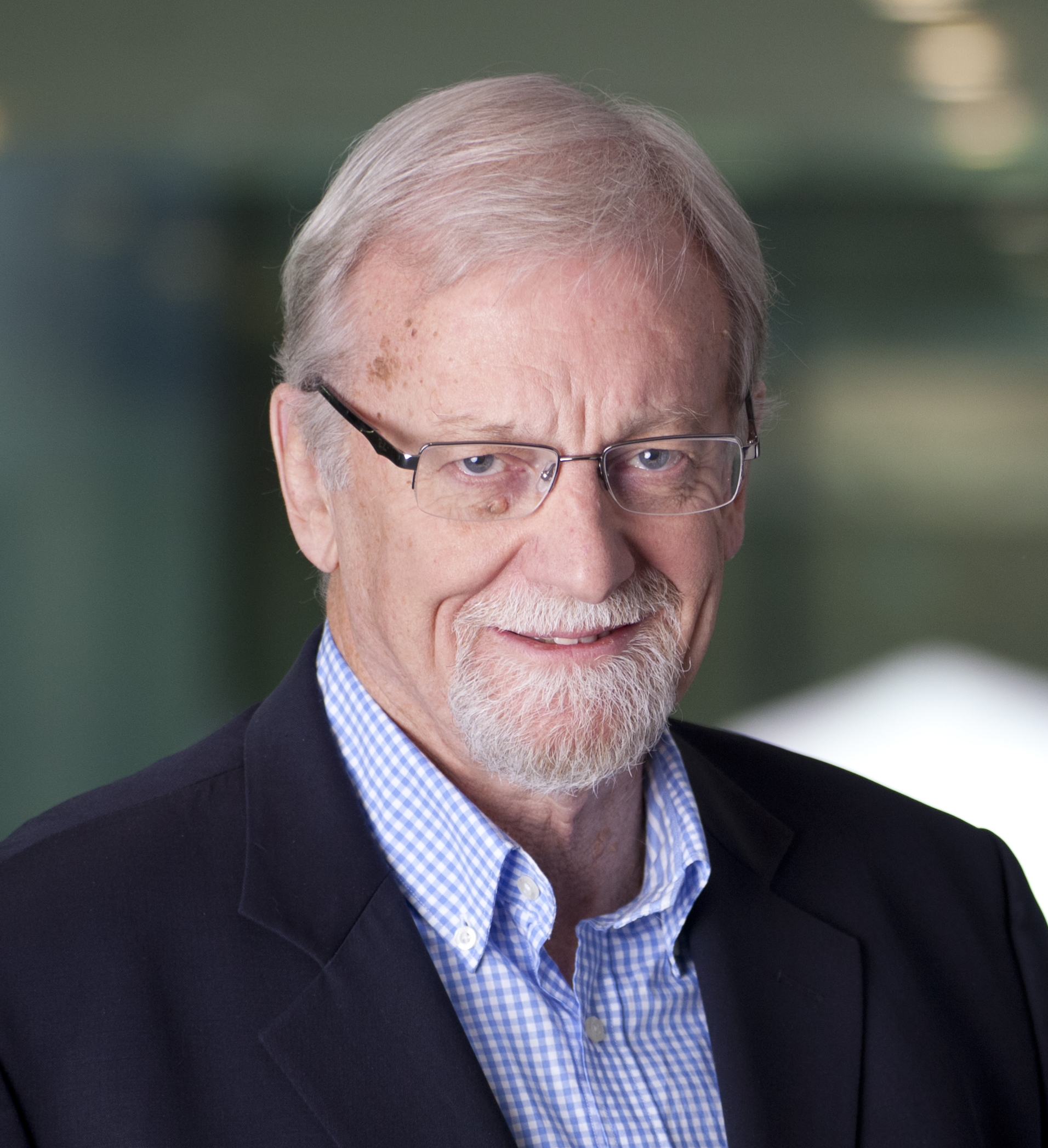
Gareth Evans, Australian Minister for Foreign Affairs (1988–1996).

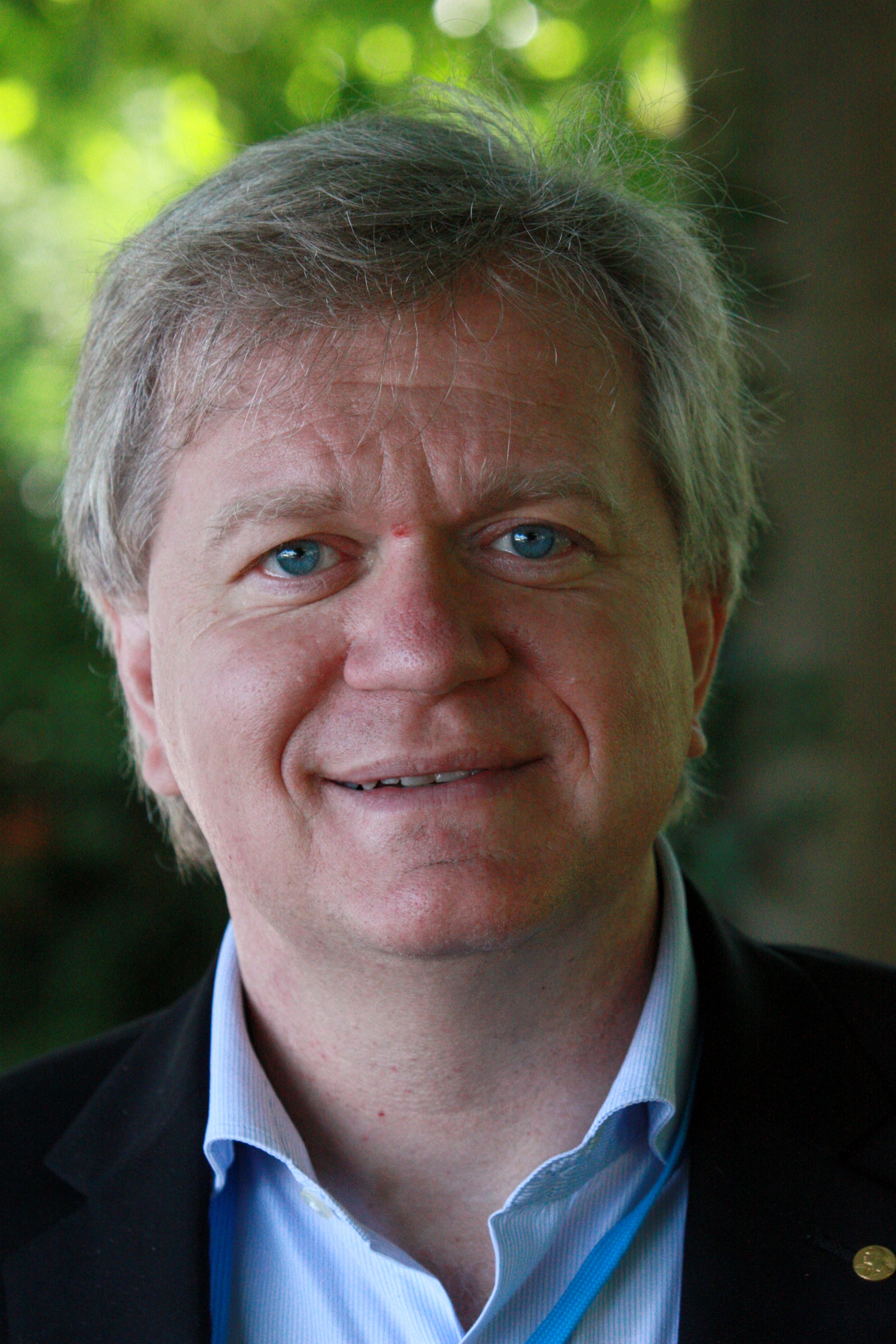
Brian Schmidt, Nobel Prize in Physics Laureate (2011) and former ANU Vice-Chancellor.

=== Honorary doctorate recipients ===
Notable Honorary Doctorate recipients have included former Australian public officials Stanley Bruce, Robert Menzies, Richard Casey, Angus Houston, Brendan Nelson, Owen Dixon, Australian persons Sidney Nolan, Norman Gregg, Charles Bean, foreign dignitaries Harold Macmillan, Lee Kuan Yew, Aung San Suu Kyi, Sheikh Hasina, K. R. Narayanan, Nelson Mandela, Desmond Tutu, Saburo Okita and foreign scientists John Cockcroft, Jan Hendrik Oort and Alexander R. Todd.

== Events ==
=== 2018 network compromise ===
The network of the university was subject to serious compromise from 9 November to 21 December 2018. ABC News reported that the initial breach occurred when a phishing message was previewed. After investigating, the university published a report on the incident. Cyber safety recommendations are generally applicable.

=== 2023 campus attack ===
In September 2023, Alex Ophel (a 24-year-old ex-student) stabbed two 20-year-old female students at the university's Fellows Oval, leaving one with critical, life-threatening injuries, and struck a male student on the head with a frying pan. Ophel had a documented history of campus violence; in 2017, he had attacked an ANU statistics tutor and several classmates with a baseball bat.

ANU Chancellor Julie Bishop later called for the Australian Capital Territory government to explain why the university was not informed of the risk beforehand.

=== College of Health and Medicine discrimination scandal ===
In May 2025, the university released the findings of an independent review led by former Victorian Police Commissioner Christine Nixon into gender and cultural issues within the College of Health and Medicine. The review revealed widespread bullying, harassment, sexism, racial discrimination, and nepotism across the college and its constituent schools, including the John Curtin School of Medical Research, the School of Medicine and Psychology, and the National Centre for Epidemiology and Population Health. Alongside the public report, a separate confidential document detailing specific allegations of potential serious misconduct and "wildly inappropriate behaviour" against named current and former staff members was delivered to university leadership.

The review, based on interviews with 83 individuals and 67 written submissions, described a "remarkable tolerance" for misconduct, with reporting pathways often compromised by conflicts of interest. It identified entrenched dysfunction, a toxic "work until you drop" culture, and significant gender imbalances in senior academic positions. Since the commissioning of the review in 2024, the university closed the standalone College of Health and Medicine and merged it with the College of Science. Vice-Chancellor Genevieve Bell publicly apologised and committed to implementing all 17 recommendations, including structural reform and external monitoring.

The findings exacerbated a growing narrative of institutional dysfunction, fueling complaints from university staff and students that the administration had allowed a toxic and fear-driven workplace environment to remain unaddressed. In August 2025, over 95 percent of voting members from the National Tertiary Education Unionpassed a motion of no confidence against Vice-Chancellor Genevieve Bell and Chancellor Julie Bishop. Amid escalating political pressure, staff strikes, and severe operational scrutiny, Vice-Chancellor Genevieve Bell announced her resignation in September 2025.

== See also ==
- ANU research centres and institutes
- ARC Training Centre for Automated Manufacture of Advanced Composites
- Australian National University Boat Club
- List of universities in Australia
