= ANU Kioloa Coastal Campus =

Coordinates: 35.545°S 150.378°E

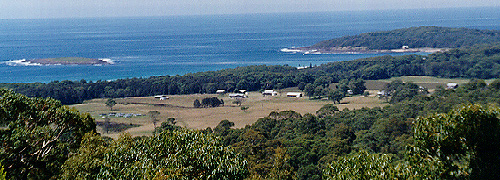
The Kioloa Coastal Campus, as of early 2000

The Kioloa Coastal Campus is a small campus of the Australian National University at Kioloa, used for studies in certain sciences. It was created in 1975, when Joy London donated the 3.48 km^{2} property on the South Coast of New South Wales to the university in perpetuity. The agreement between London and the university stressed that the property "was to be used primarily for teaching and research in the field sciences". The property became the Edith and Joy London Foundation, and is now known as the Kioloa Coastal Campus (KCC) of the Australian National University.

It consists of a number of wooden accommodation buildings (with more under refurbishment), a wooden teaching/research building, and a more modern visitors' centre with cooking and eating facilities.

The Kioloa Global Land Cover Test Site (GLCTS) Pathfinder site is centered at the campus.
