= Nicholas Southwood =

Australian philosopher and academic

- Awards: ARC Future Fellow, Fulbright Scholarship, University Medal (ANU)

Philosophical work
- Era: 21st-century philosophy
- Region: Western philosophy
- School: Analytic
- Institutions: Australian National University
- Main interests: political philosophy, moral philosophy

Nicholas Southwood is an Australian philosopher and Professor of Philosophy at the Australian National University. He is a co-editor of Political Philosophy and Head of the ANU School of Philosophy. Southwood is known for his research on contractualism and social philosophy.

== Books ==
- Contractualism and the Foundations of Morality, Oxford University Press, 2010, ISBN 9780199664658
- Explaining Norms, with Geoffrey Brennan, Lina Eriksson and Robert E. Goodin, Oxford University Press, 2013, ISBN 9780199654680
