= ARC Training Centre for Automated Manufacture of Advanced Composites =

Australian research center

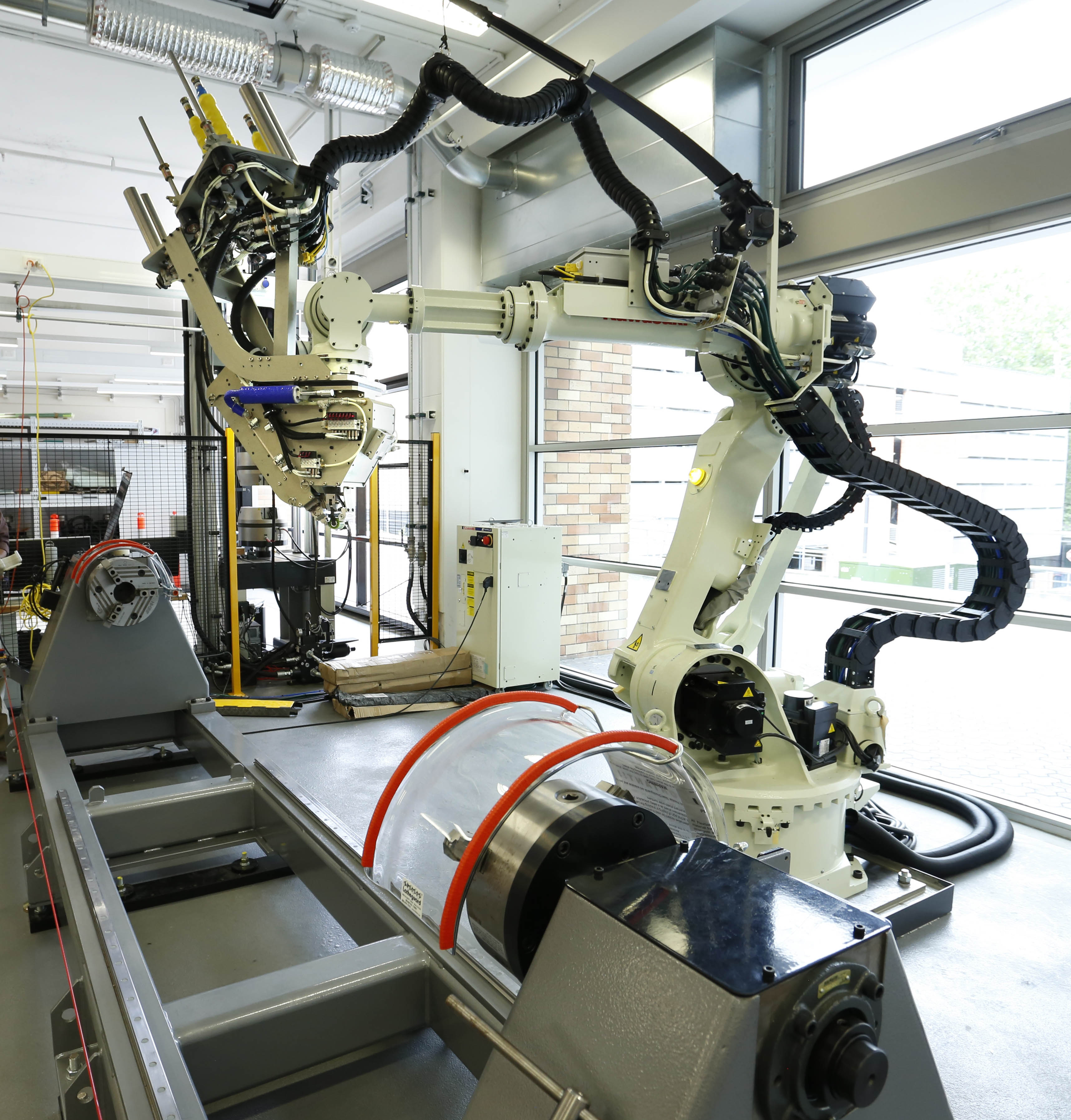
Automated Dynamics manufactured AFP machine

The Australian Research Council Industrial Transformation Training Centre (ITTC) Automated Manufacture of Advanced Composites (AMAC) is a research centre focussing on lowering barriers for Australian industry to access, engage, adopt and propagate automated composite manufacturing innovations. Led by the University of New South Wales (UNSW SYDNEY), AMAC was established in 2017 by a consortium of Australian and international universities and Industries. AMAC operated across two other university nodes (Australian National University and Technical University of Munich) located both locally and internationally. The primary objective is to develop and implement automated manufacturing techniques for advanced composite materials through automation and innovative technologies.

AMAC has nine industry partners. The partnering industries include Australian Nuclear Science and Technology Organisation, Australian Institute of Sports, Advanced Composite Structures Australia, the Defence Science and Technology Group, Omni Tankers, Carbonix, Advanced Fibre Placement Technology (AFPT), FEI, and Ford Motor Company.

Funding was provided by the Australian Research Council (ARC) and the industries involved. The AMAC Centre was funded with $3.85 million by ARC for five years between 2017 and 2022, during and after which industry collaborations and further funding were established to continue the AMAC Centre’s research.

AMAC had its official opening on 27 November 2017 at UNSW Sydney.

Organisation

Professor Gangadhara Prusty from UNSW SYDNEY is the Founding Centre Director. Prof. Paul Compston acted as the Deputy Director of the Centre during 2017-2021. The collaborators and partners of AMAC include:

- Australian National University (ANU), Canberra
- Technical University of Munich, Germany
- The University of Sydney
- Australian Nuclear Science and Technology Organisation - ANSTO
- Advanced Composite Structures Australia
- Defence Science and Technology Group
- Omni Tanker
- Carbonix
- Advanced Fibre Placement Technology (AFPT)
- FEI Company (Thermo Fisher)
- Ford Motor Company
- FlexeGraph
- Transport for NSW
- Rux Energy
- Gowing Bros.
- Ocius
- SDI Limited
- Australian Coal Industry's Research Program (ACARP)

AMAC focuses on four key themes:

1. Material Enhancement: Novel materials, additives, and reinforcements to enhance composite properties. This includes investigating advanced fibres, resins, and hybrid materials to achieve superior mechanical, thermal, and electrical performance.
2. Process Property Optimisation: Manufacturing processes and automation methods to optimise composite properties. Techniques such as AFP, resin infusion, and curing cycles are studied to achieve consistent quality, reduce defects, and enhance overall performance.
3. Simulation and Performance Prediction: Computational models and simulations are explored to optimise designs and manufacturing processes by predicting material behaviour, structural integrity, and performance.
4. Design, Integration, and Optimisation: Methods to develop integrated solutions for sensor integrated structural designs and integrations. This theme focuses on designing composite structures for specific applications (e.g., aerospace, naval, automotive) and optimising their performance throughout their lifecycle.

Research Facilities at AMAC

AMAC is equipped with state-of-the-art facilities that support its research and development activities. These include advanced manufacturing labs, composite material testing facilities, and simulation environments. The infrastructure enables researchers and industry collaborators to conduct cutting-edge experiments, prototype development, and technology validation in a controlled and innovative setting.

Facilities at AMAC include

- Facilities for composite material design, analysis, lay-up, curing, and testing—all under one roof for hand-layup, vacuum bag infusion, prepreg and automated fibre placement.
- Automated Fibre Placement (AFP) facility

AMAC has pioneered the use of embedded sensor technologies to monitor processing conditions during composite component manufacturing. These sensors also track structural health throughout the life of composite components, enhancing safety and reliability.
