= Skaidrīte Darius =

Latvian folk dancer and computer scientist

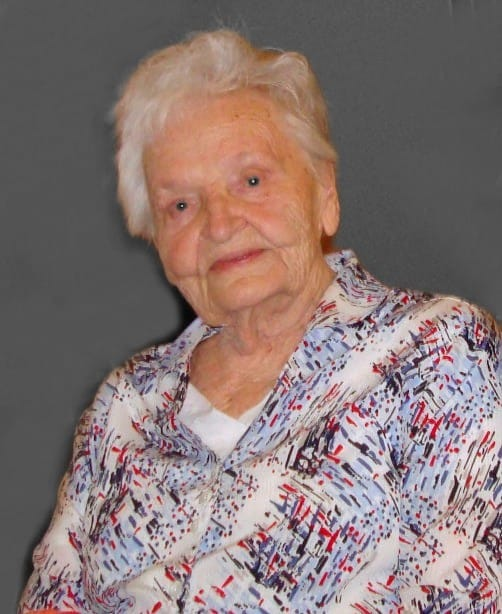
- Born: November 6, 1927; Balvi
- Died: April 21, 2024 (aged 96); Canberra
- Education: Australian National University
- Awards: Order of the Cross of Recognition V class

Skaidrīte Darius (1927-2024) was a Latvian folk dancer and computer scientist. She founded the Latvian folk dance group, Sprigulītis. Darius also received an honorary doctorate from the Australian National University and had one of their building's named after her for her contributions to computer science.

== Early life ==
Darius was born on November 6, 1927, to Arnold and Olga Skriver in Balvi. She went to primary school in Aizpurve and secondary school in Balvi. She briefly lived in England but moved to Canberra in 1950. Darius got a degree in humanities from the Australian National University in 1960.

== Career ==
Darius was the Honorary Chief of the Latvian Song and Dance Festival in 2018 and 2023. Darius founded the folk dance group, Sprigulītis, which performed Latvian folkdances from 1970 to 1990. Sprigulītis merged with the Australian folkdance group, Merry Couple, to do a tour of Sun Belt. She performed in tours in Australia, Sweden, the USA, Germany, England, Canada, and Latvia. Darius's group's performance of Sun Belt won them the World Association of Free Latvians' Cultural Foundation Award in 1976. The group also won the Goper Foundation Award, Vera Rulliņa Award, and Colonel Vilis Janums Award. The Alku Deja, a dance created by Darius, was shown in the opening ceremony of the Sydney Opera House. Darius composed folk songs in her 90s.

The Skaidrite Darius Building in 2026

Darius had a mathematics job at the Australian National University, which was typically reserved for men. She was given the job due to her high achievement the math exam that all of the applicants were given. Darius raised her daughter alone after the death of her husband. Darius received an honorary doctorate from the Australian National University for her contributions to computer science and women's equality on December 10, 2019.

The Australian National University named its computer science building after Darius on February 27, 2025, with the opening ceremony being attended by Latvian ambassador to Australia, Marģers Krams. Darius was awarded the Order of the Cross of Recognition V class in 2012. Darius died in Canberra on April 21, 2024.
