= Charcoal Tank Nature Reserve =

Protected area in New South Wales, Australia

The Charcoal Tank Nature Reserve
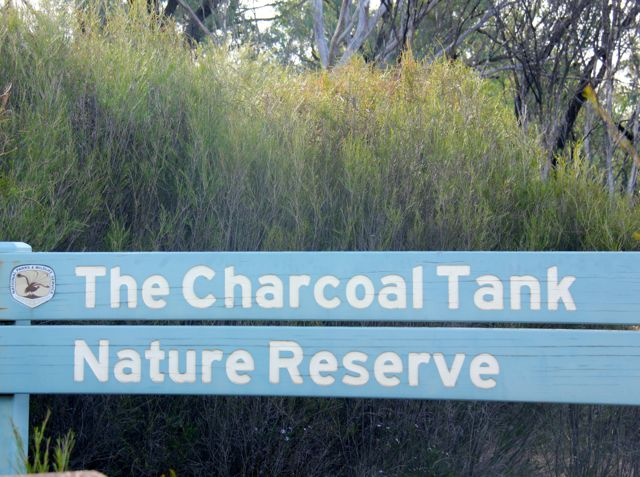
- The Charcoal Tank Nature Reserve

- Location within New South Wales
- Location: New South Wales
- Nearest city: West Wyalong
- Coordinates: 33°59′S 147°09′E
- Area: 0.86 km^{2} (0.33 sq mi)
- Established: May 1966
- Governing body: NSW National Parks & Wildlife Service
- Website: https://www.environment.nsw.gov.au/NationalParks/parkHome.aspx?id=N0481

The Charcoal Tank Nature Reserve is a protected nature reserve in the central western region of New South Wales, Australia. The 86.4-hectare (213-acre) reserve is situated 10 kilometres (6.2 mi) south of West Wyalong and may be accessed via the Newell Highway and The Charcoal Tank Road. The reserve is an important refuge for native flora and fauna in a highly fragmented landscape, one in which the majority of the original vegetation has been removed.

== Description ==
Road into The Charcoal Tank Nature Reserve

Middle dam in The Charcoal Tank Nature Reserve

The land surrounding the reserve has been extensively altered through agricultural practice and the development of roads. As a remnant in a highly modified landscape, the reserve's vegetation is significant to the region as it includes critically endangered mallee and mallee–broombush in the absence on Spinifex; in total there are only three protected areas within New South Wales containing this now rare vegetative structure. The International Union for Conservation of Nature’s category for the reserve is Ia, a protected area that is dedicated to conserving biodiversity and minimising disturbances by limiting human access.

The reserve is relatively flat with a dry, red, loamy clay top soil; three man-made dams are situated along a drainage line that runs the length of the reserve.

The traditional landowners of the region are the Wiradjuri people, inhabiting the region for over 40,000 years prior to European settlement in the area. Little is known about the Wiradjuri people's use of the reserve except that it was likely a place for gathering food. After European settlement but prior to its listing as a Nature Reserve the site was used as camp on the traveling stock route and as a public watering place. In 1960 it became NSW Wildlife Refuge No. 2 but was still available for use as a watering ground and camp. The area officially became The Charcoal Tank Nature Reserve in 1966; prior to its change in status a rest stop was cut into a portion of the reserve along the Newell Highway and remains there today.

== Climate ==
Mallee

The region's climate is considered semi-arid with hot dry summers and cold winters. Elevation is 257 m (843 ft) above sea level with the mean minimum temperature 3.0 °C (37.4 °F) and mean maximum 34.1 °C (93.4 °F), mean relative humidity ranges between 48% in summer to 90% during winter with mean wind speeds ranging from 10.8–20.4 km/h (6.7–12.7 mph). Annual rainfall over the past 13 years has ranged from 122.4 to 895.6 mm (4.82 to 35.26 in) per annum; the region has experienced severe periods of drought within the last 30 years.

== Ecology ==
Mallee

The reserve has a high level of biodiversity for its size and is an important remnant for a range of flora and fauna, including some nomadic and migratory birds species. Due to its size and isolation the reserve is only able to provide somewhat limited resources to support large numbers of resident animal species. Fire history for the reserve prior to 1966 is not well documented but evidence at the site suggests it is long-unburnt and recent records show fire has not occurred there since it was announced as a reserve in 1966.

== Flora ==
Even though the reserve is small there are three distinct communities of vegetation. The dominant community is mallee-broombush made up of broombush, blue mallee, green mallee and bull mallee. Two notable native shrubs sharing the mallee-broombush community are purple kunzea and dagger-leaved wattle. The second largest group of vegetation is a eucalyptus-callitris mix; including inland grey box, mugga ironbark, and black cypress pine. The eucalyptus and callitris community has a well-developed understory that includes native shrubs such as cough bush, quandong and hakea wattle. Understory and groundcover in other areas of the reserve has been lost or badly degraded. The smallest community of vegetation is made up of black cypress pine, Dwyer's red-gum and currawang.

Mugga ironbark

The dominant community of mallee and broombush is listed as critically endangered under the NSW Threatened Species Conservation Act, with only two other Nature Reserves in NSW protecting similar communities. Mallee and broombush have been extensively harvested in the region since European settlement.

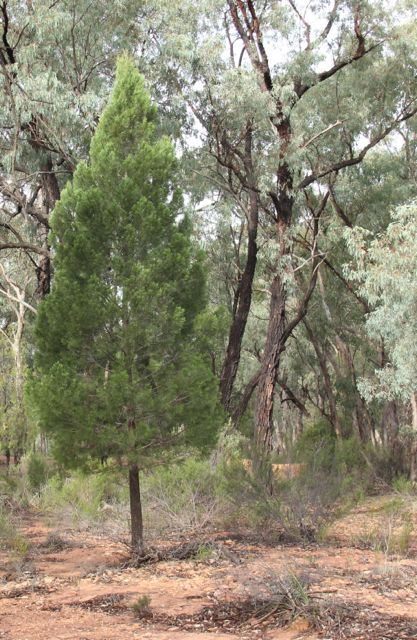
Black cypress

== Fauna ==
Birds represent the largest number of vertebrate species occurring within the reserve with over 165 species identified; 96 species have been banded and released as part of a long-term monitoring study in the reserve. Some of the reserve's breeding residents such as brown treecreeper and varied sittella are listed as Vulnerable under the NSW Threatened Species Conservation (TSC) Act 1995. Data from the long-term bird banding project shows a decrease in the number of brown treecreepers present. There are twenty other birds that utilize the reserve that are also listed as Vulnerable under the NSW TSC Act; some examples are painted honeyeater, superb parrot, regent honeyeater and the swift parrot. Under Australia's national Environment Protection and Biodiversity Conservation Act 1999 the regent honeyeater and the swift parrot are listed as endangered and the superb parrot as vulnerable.

Superb parrot

Sadly, species such as malleefowl, Gilbert's whistler, southern scrub robin and crested shrike-tit have become extinct from the reserve in the past 30 years; the last crested shrike-tit banded in the reserve was in 1997. The disappearance of the malleefowl not only in the reserve but the surrounding region is due to a number of pressures; these include predation by red fox and feral cat, fragmentation and loss of habitat, isolation, competition and degradation of habitat by domestic livestock and introduced vertebrates such as European rabbit and feral goats. More recently the reserve's long-term bird monitoring study has recorded a decline in species that were previously abundant or regular visitors to the reserve, this includes species such as the grey-crowned babbler, shy heathwren, diamond firetail, and eastern yellow robin

Painted honeyeater

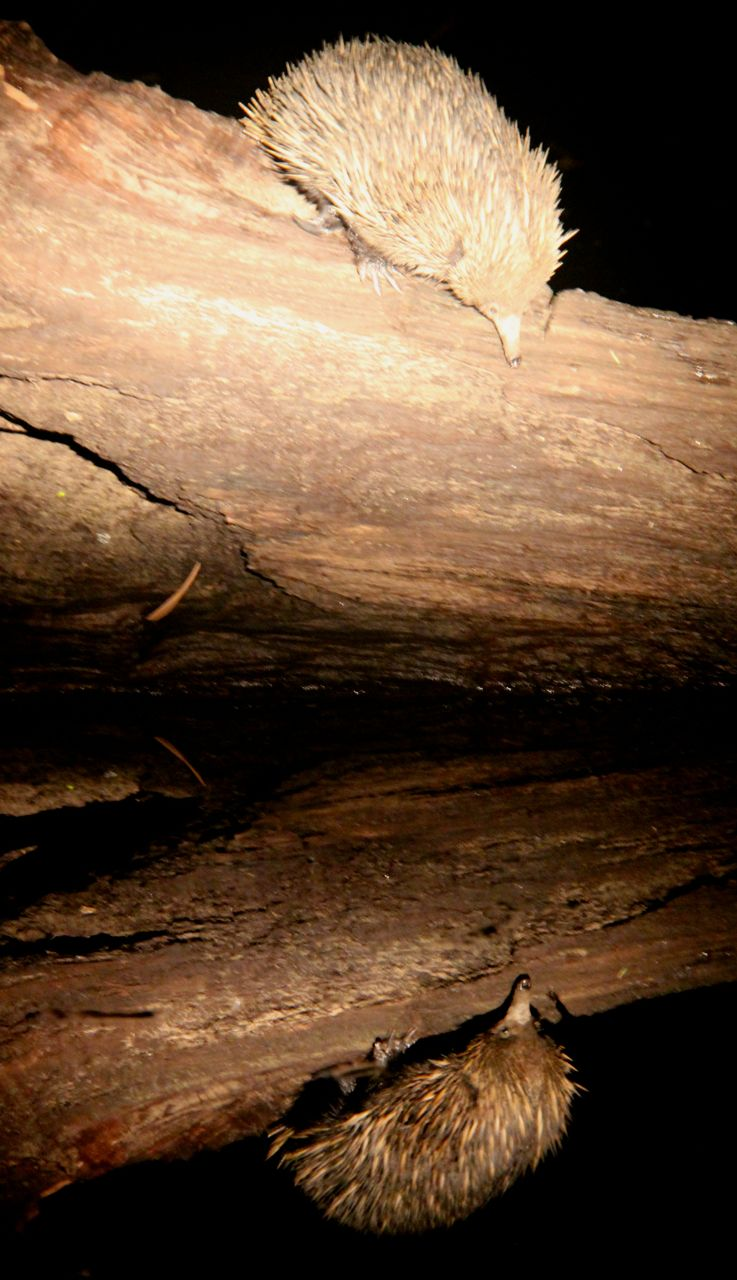
Short-beaked echidna

Other fauna found in the reserve includes mammals such as eastern grey kangaroo, swamp wallaby, short-beaked echidna and sugar glider. Five amphibians are known to occur in the reserve and nine species of reptile such as lace monitor and eastern brown snake. Some invertebrates found in the reserve are common freshwater yabby and at least nine species of butterfly including spotted Jezebel and Australian painted lady. The reserve may also be important to the long-term survival of the locally threatened butterfly western dusky-blue, this species is dependent upon Mallee for its survival and has been located in remnant mallee habitat close to West Wyalong.

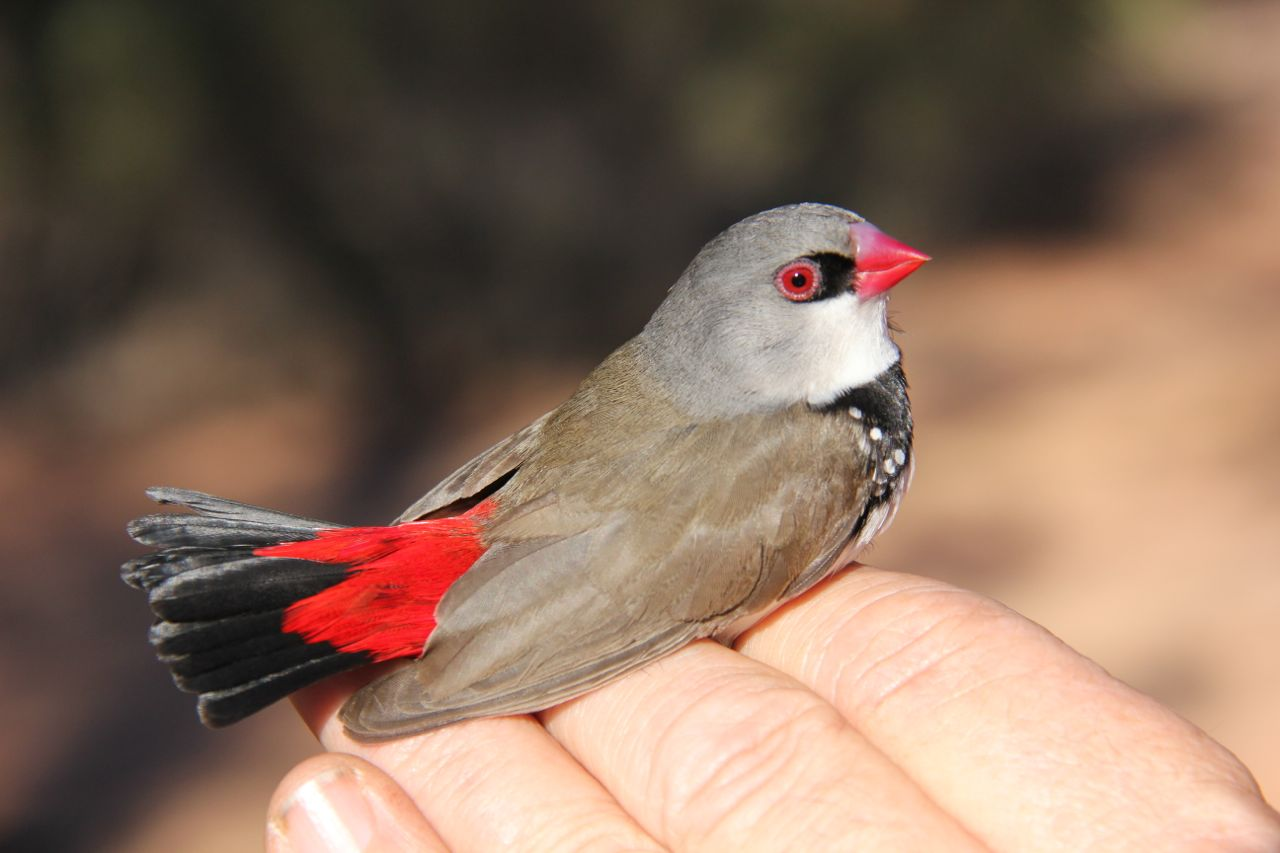
Diamond firetail in the hand

Vertebrate pest species recorded infrequently in The Charcoal Tank Nature Reserve include cat, red fox, common starling, European rabbit, European hare, house mouse and feral pig.

== Environmental threats ==
Due to its small size and isolation in a fragmented landscape The Charcoal Tank Nature Reserve's structure and biodiversity are at risk from threatening processes such as climate change, edge effects, pest species, pollution, high intensity fire and further clearing of roadside and patch remnants in the region. Any of these threatening processes can have serious impacts on biodiversity but they are rarely encountered in isolation having a compounding effect on individual species and ecosystems as a whole.

Fragmentation has isolated the reserve from other remnant patches making it difficult for species to move through the landscape. This places species at greater risk of local extinction by preventing range expansion and therefore decreasing genetic diversity and trapping species in areas without sufficient resources. Once a species becomes locally extinct re-colonisation through immigration across a fragmented landscape is highly unlikely. If species are forced to move across a fragmented landscape they are at greater risk of predation or collisions with vehicles; this is especially the case for species in the reserve which is bordered by the Newell Highway

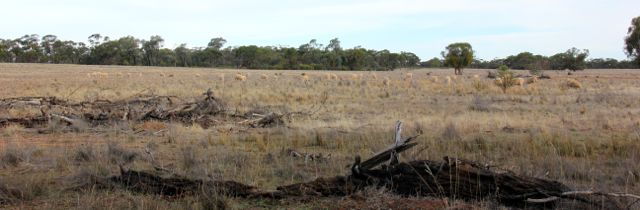
Farmland surrounding The Charcoal Tank Nature Reserve

Roadside vegetation in NSW is now extremely important to the survival of many species that rely on them as the only corridors to larger remnants; this includes species found in the reserve. Small remnants such as The Charcoal Tank Nature Reserve and roadside strips are under increased pressure from edge effects as they have smaller interior habitats. The reserve's edges are linear and artificial making it more susceptible to degrading processes including severe weather events, erosion, insecticidal drift from neighbouring properties, select species dominance, grazing by neighbouring domestic livestock and invasion of pest species. Predation of bird nests along artificially created edges in Mallee is higher than naturally occurring Mallee edges. Gully erosion in the west of the reserve is a long-standing problem, caused by runoff from the cleared surrounding paddocks and the artificial drainage line to dams. The reserve becomes a sink for the cleared surrounding landscape with topsoil disturbance and potential pollutants and seeds of pest plants entering the reserve. The rest stop that has encroached into the reserve from the Newell Highway allows easy access to the public. The area of the reserve immediately adjoining the rest stop is regularly polluted by rubbish and is used as a toilet. Rubbish may attract introduced pest species to the reserve, and general public access can increase the likelihood of fire with makeshift fireplaces evident.

The altering of weather patterns caused by anthropogenic climate change is a serious threat to the reserve as the impact of increased severe weather events such as drought, fire, floods and storms can exacerbate existing threatening processes. Changes to the timing of seasonal onset can modify food availability such as nectar and impact on the survival and abundance of species as the metabolic cost of finding food increases. The reserve has already been impacted by long periods of drought which have seen a decline in the overall abundance of bird species in the last 30 years. A recent study using data on white-plumed honeyeater collected in The Charcoal Tank Nature Reserve over the past 23 years shows their size has increased in correlation with warmer mean temperatures and a decrease in rainfall. The study by Gardner shows selection against smaller individuals at breeding time. Selective mortality has the potential to threaten population viability as conditions in the region become dryer and temperatures increase

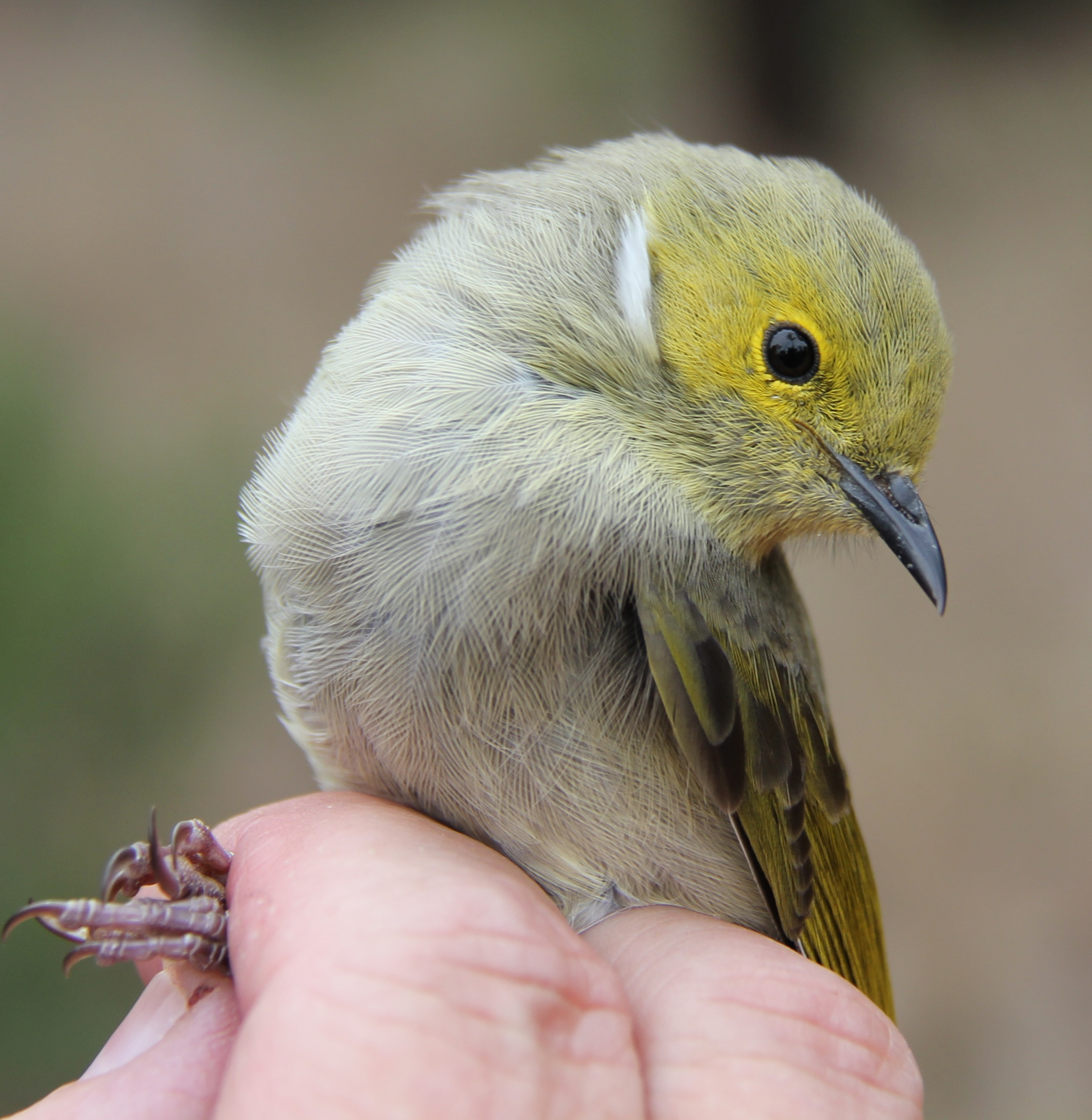
White-plumed honeyeater

If the rate of wildfire increases with climate change slow growing flora in the reserve, such as black cypress pine, may be lost. Callitris rely on seeds alone for reproduction and post fire may be outcompeted by species such as Eucalyptus that are faster growing and have more recovery options through epicormic buds and lignotubers.

== Reserve management ==
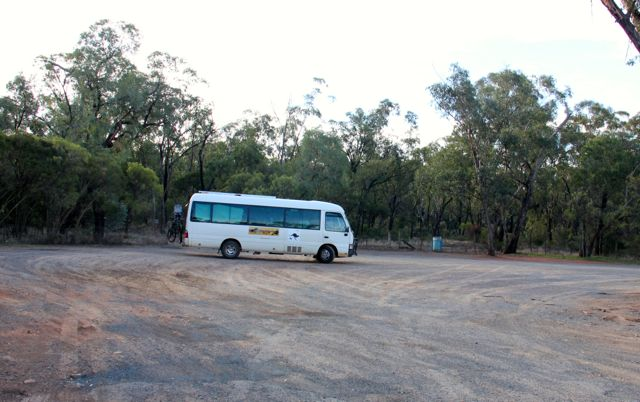
The Charcoal Tank rest area

The Charcoal Tank Nature Reserve is managed by the New South Wales Parks and Wildlife Service (NSW NPWS) under the NSW Office of Environment and Heritage. Protection of the reserve since 1966 has prevented Mallee and Broombush from being harvested and further cleared for agriculture. Protection has also decreased threatening processes that may have otherwise increased as a result of the site being used as a camp along the travelling stock route. Problems such as overgrazing, erosion and degradation caused by hooved animals and the spread of exotic seeds through the dung of domestic herbivores are caused by such itinerant campers. In accordance with the New South Wales National Parks and Wildlife Act 1974 the NPWS have a formal management plan in place for the reserve that outlines actions required to ensure its conservation, with the current plan running to 2021. The management plan outlines the conservation value of the reserve, its current state, areas of concern, threats to conservation and prioritises management and action required. Some immediate management challenges include maintaining the fence line to prevent the entry of domestic livestock, erosion control and minimising pollution and disturbance from the adjoining rest stop. On a larger scale protecting remaining roadside remnants and those on private land will ensure that connections between The Charcoal Tank Nature Reserve and larger reserves such as Buddigower (327 ha) are maintained

Data collected as part of an ongoing and long-term bird banding study that commenced in July 1986 is extremely important to guiding the conservation and management of the reserve. The banding group visits the site up to seven times per year and provides valuable information to the NSW NPWS, The Atlas for NSW Wildlife, scientific publications and the Handbook of Australian, New Zealand and Antarctic Birds

The NSW NPWS works closely with the local community to manage the reserve, including the West Wyalong Aboriginal Land Council, the Bland/Temora Bush Fire Management Committee and local rural fire brigades. The NSW NPWS has a 2014 fire management strategy in place that provides clear operational guidelines, information on the most sensitive sites within the reserve, vegetation maps, fire suppression strategies and relevant contact details. Currently the strategy requires that fire in the reserve be immediately suppressed, any prescribed burns may only occur after a formal review of environmental factors because of the critically endangered Mallee-Broombush community. The long-unburnt conditions of the reserve are favourable to some species such as Acanthagenys rufogularis (spiny-cheeked honeyeaters). By contrast, Hylacola cauta (shy heath wren) seems to prefer habitat that contains vegetation with varying ranges of post fire age; the long unburnt status of the reserve along with drought may explain why this species has declined within the reserve. Managing conflicting habitat requirements for a diverse range of species in a small area will be an ongoing challenge

== See also ==
- Protected areas of New South Wales

== Bibliography ==
- Pizzey, G., Knight, F. 2012. The Field Guide to the Birds of Australia Ninth Edition. Harper Collins Publishers: Sydney.
- Van Dyck, S., Gynther, I., Baker, A. 2013. Field Companion to the Mammals of Australia. New Holland Publisher: Chatswood, Sydney.
- Wilson, S., Swan, G., 2013. A Complete Guide to Reptiles of Australia Fourth Edition. New Holland Publishers: Chatswood, Sydney.
