= Australian National Centre for the Public Awareness of Science =

Australian National University
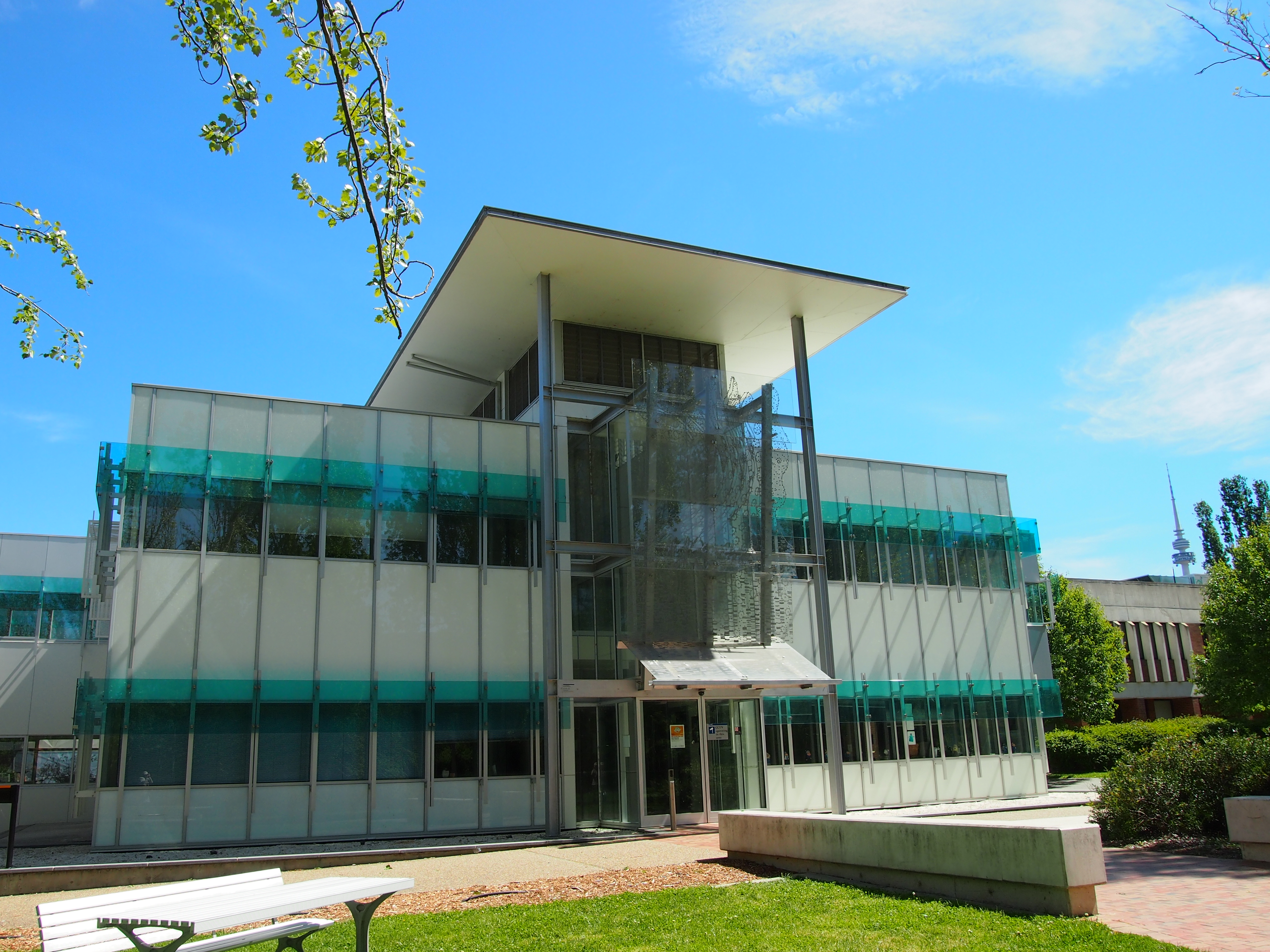
- Type: Public
- Established: 1996
- Location: Canberra, Australian Capital Territory, Australia
- Website: cpas.anu.edu.au

The Australian National Centre for the Public Awareness of Science (commonly shortened to CPAS) is part of the Australian National University. In March 2000 it became an accredited Centre for the Australian National Commission for UNESCO. In 2016, CPAS was the first university not based in the United States to partner with the Alan Alda Center for Communicating Science.

== Work of the Centre ==
As a UNESCO Centre, CPAS engages with science communication and communicators in the Pacific region and beyond. In partnership with the UNESCO Pacific Office in Apia, Samoa, CPAS has focused on science teaching training and communication in Pacific nations. As well as running a science journalism workshop for Pacific Island journalists in 2001, CPAS followed up in the same year with a science teacher workshop and the first Pacific Science Communication Forum. The UNESCO office in Jakarta invited CPAS to join a mission to Cambodia to conduct a survey to identify and assess the needs of the country with respect to science education in schools and universities. Other activities include joining with UNESCO (Apia) to help in its aims to raise social participation in science in and around the Pacific.

Other activities of CPAS include the presentation of workshops for secondary school science teachers and others in Fiji, India, Sri Lanka, Thailand, Japan and New Zealand. A joint teaching program is being developed with the National University of Singapore. In South Africa, CPAS helped to develop a touring hands-on science exhibition and has been invited to work in and with various South African science centres.

== Teaching, Outreach and Research ==
CPAS conducts research and teaching on topics related to the field of science communication, including focuses on Science, Technology and Society, Responsible Research and Innovation, Science outreach, and Science policy, among others, and offers degrees in science communication in all tertiary levels. Outreach programs within Australia include workshops for research scientists, science teachers, policy makers, Non-governmental organization employees, and science centre personnel. CPAS also hosts the Popsicule, a research hub dedicated to understanding science imagery and themes present in popular culture and entertainment.

== History ==
The centre was officially launched in 1996 as part of the Australian National University (ANU) and in close coordination with the researchers who had launched Questacon in 1988. The centre took its name from the Public awareness of science paradigm that was dominant in the science communication field at the time.

Professor Chris Bryant, then Dean of Science at the ANU, was selected to the first interim director of CPAS, and after a year long hiring process, Dr. Sue Stocklmayer assumed the role of centre director. Dr. Stocklmayer served as director from 1998 to 2015, when she was succeeded by Professor Joan Leach. Professor Leach left the role in 2025 after being selected to the position of Deputy Vice-Chancellor (Education) at the ANU, and Professor Sujatha Raman is currently serving as director of the centre.

== Notable Alumni and Staff ==
=== Alumni ===
- Lee Constable
- Nate Byrne (ABC weather presenter)

=== Notable Faculty ===
- Susan Stocklmayer (former director, Emeritus Professor)
- Mark Howden (Emeritus Professor)
- Brad E. Tucker (astrophysicist/Cosmologist, current professor)
- Niraj Lal (ABC presenter, former CPAS visiting fellow and lecturer)
