= Robert James Bell =

Australian children's TV host (b.1975)

Robert Bell
- In the Scope Lab Studio
- Born: 10 April 1975 (age 50); Melbourne, Australia
- Other names: Dr Rob
- Education: PhD - Material Chemistry and Bachelor of Science (Honours)
- Occupation: Education Officer
- Employer: CSIRO
- Known for: Host of Network TEN programme, Scope
- Spouse: Tiffany Bell
- Children: Cooper Bell; Sebastian Bell; Zara Bell

Dr Rob (Robert James Bell, born 10 April 1975 ) is the host of the Australian children's television programme Scope where Dr Rob breaks down the science of subjects relevant to school-aged children. Dr Rob is employed at CSIRO as a science education officer.

== Education ==
Dr Rob studied science at the University of Queensland, graduating with a Bachelor of Science in 1994, and going on to a complete an honours year in 1995, writing a thesis on superconductors. In 1996, he went directly into his PhD in the field of Material Chemistry, which he graduated in 2000. His PhD thesis was entitled "Investigation and characterisation of co-precipitation syntheses for the production of La1-xSrxMnO3" in the field of "Solid oxide fuel cells using Perovskite and ceramic powders".

After 12 months traveling and work in Europe, he returned to Australia and commenced work at the Commonwealth Scientific & Industrial Research Organisation (CSIRO) in the education children's division, where he visited schools & juvenile detention centres presenting scientific experiments & explanations for the audience.

== Major interests ==
Dr Rob is a keen soccer player, having played during his study years for the UQ Soccer Club. He continued to play after his graduation and went on to become the joint treasurer in 2001, and was sole treasurer from 2002 till 2007. In 2007, he was awarded the UQ Soccer Club service award for being the best keeper for the club, creation of the club alumni and the years served as club treasurer.

Dr Rob 's enjoyment of chocolate was made evident while studying at the University of Queensland. He joined the Chocolate appreciation society and was eventually made president. This included hosting a chocolate tasting each semester. The society at the time had a membership of 700.

== Work ==
In 2001, Bell commenced work at the CSIRO Science Education Centre (CSIROSEC) in Brisbane as science education officer, where he was initially involved with the schools programme for Southern Queensland and Science on Saturdays.

A side task to his employment was appearances on the television programme Totally Wild and later became the host of a new programme called Scope.

In 2005, Bell gave the keynote address at the District conference of Coopers Plains Learning Community, where he presented the topic "Making Links with the Wider Community".

=== Totally Wild ===
Bell appeared on Totally Wild on Tuesdays in the scientific segment. Over the two years that he spent doing this segment, he developed his character of "Dr Rob".

=== Scope ===
Dr Rob and the Scope car

Network Ten in conjunction with CSIRO developed a programme called Scope, initially airing on Mondays at 4pm. New episodes now airs at 8am Thursdays and repeat episodes air at 9am Saturdays on Eleven.

Dr Rob has been described as a "mad scientist", as well as being "zany" and "mad capped". This is most likely to the very animated style of his TV personality.

Dr Rob's appearances on Scope are nearly always in his signature white lab coat, even scuba diving in it one episode about marine life. This can also be seen in any publicity photograph of himself or Scope, as he was even wearing it when receiving the Japan prize in Tokyo.

He eventually passed on the reins to Lee Constable who hosted the show from 20 August 2016 forward.

==== Awards ====
In 2006, Scope was nominated for "Most Outstanding Children's Program" in the 2006 TV Week Logie awards. Scope won the 2008 Japan Prize, an award for outstanding educational children's television, 2008 for best television series. Dr Rob flew to Tokyo to collect the prize on 28 October 2008.

== Other appearances ==
In February 2008, Dr Rob flew to New York City to appear on the Rachael Ray Show, where he used a food theme to demonstrate some scientific principles, using ingredients such as corn starch and hydrogen peroxide. The episode went to air on 16 Feb 2009 and can be viewed on the "Rachel Ray Show" website.

He made a second appearance on 3 July 2009 performing some spectacular experiments for 4 July. This also can be viewed on the "Rachel Ray Show" website.

Dr Rob also appeared as a member of the Brains Trust on episode 13 of The Einstein Factor, on ABC Television in Australia, which went to air on 3 May 2009.

Most recently, Dr Rob hosted the Big Bloody Experiment in 2023's National Science Week, a campaign aimed at educating children about blood with fun experiments and workshops. This was sponsored by Lifeblood.
