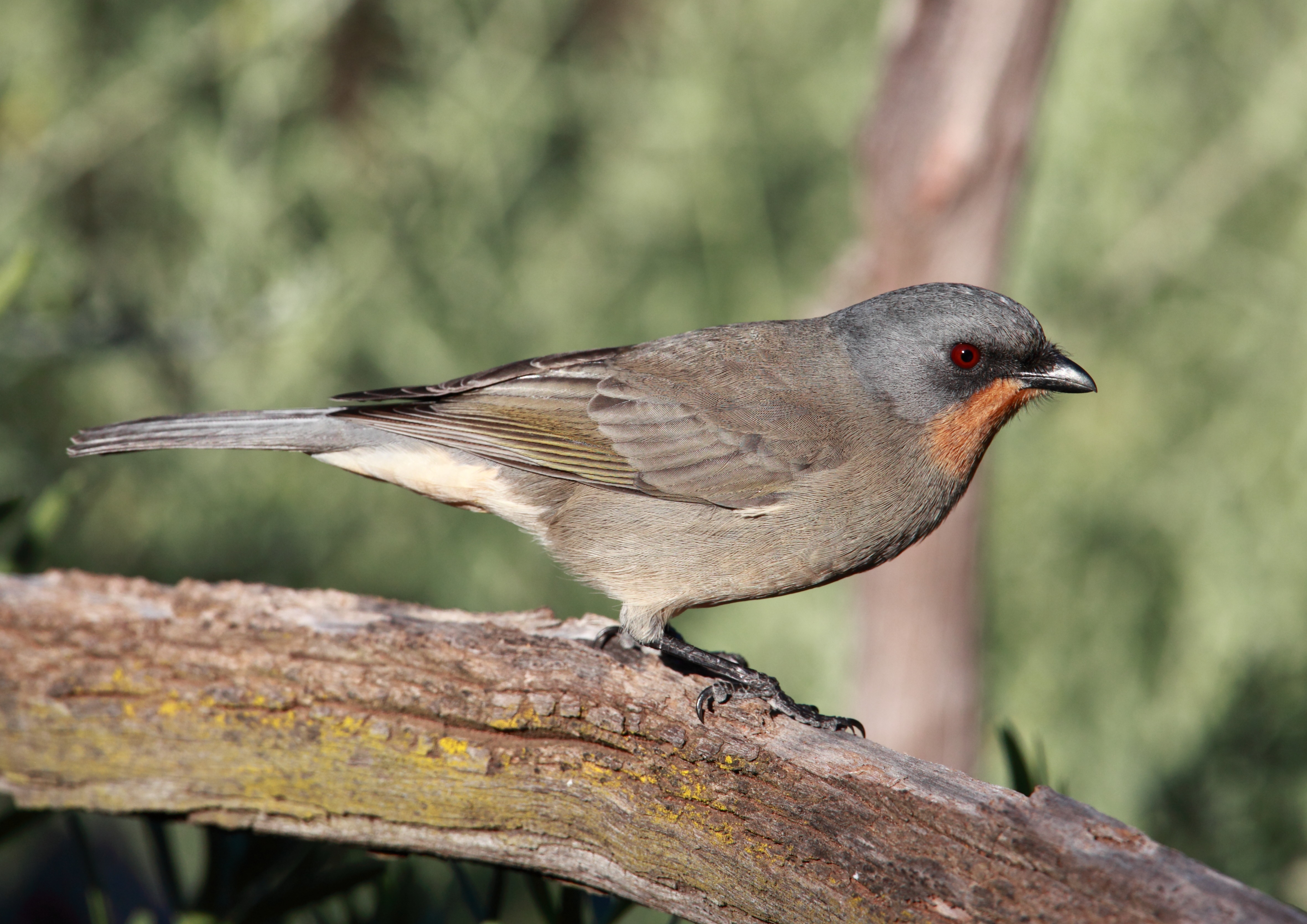

Conservation status
- Least Concern (IUCN 3.1)

Scientific classification
- Kingdom: Animalia
- Phylum: Chordata
- Class: Aves
- Order: Passeriformes
- Family: Pachycephalidae
- Genus: Pachycephala
- Species: P. inornata

Binomial name
- Pachycephala inornata Gould, 1841

= Gilbert's whistler =

Species of bird

Gilbert's whistler (Pachycephala inornata) is a monotypic species of bird endemic to Australia, scattered in semi-arid zones of southern Australia.

== Taxonomy ==
The family Pachycephalidae originated within the Australo-Papuan region. Together with the red-lored whistler and the olive whistler, Gilbert's whistler is basal to the genus Pachycephala – the typical whistlers. This old monotypic lineage represents a relictual form that was once more widespread.

John Gould, who first described this species in 1841, named it after Mr Gilbert who discovered the bird in Western Australia and collected specimens that he handed over to Gould. As for its scientific name – Pachycephala inornata – in Ancient Greek pachys and kephale respectively mean 'thick' and 'head'; several of the members of the genus Pachycephala are indeed called 'thickheads', and other common names for Gilbert's whistler include black-lored Gilbert thickhead, red-throated thickhead, Gilbert's thickhead, or simply thickhead. With inornatus meaning 'plain' in Latin, the second part of its binominal name is attributed to Gilbert's whistler's plumage, which is often described in the literature as being plain.

There are several entries in the GenBank DNA sequence database for Pachycephala inornata.

Gould and Richter lithograph of male (top) and female (below) Gilbert's whistler

== Description ==
The adult male, which weighs 29.8-32.5 g, possesses a rufous-coloured chin and throat from its third year of life, as does its most likely closest relative, the red-lored whistler. Both males can easily be differentiated by the colour of their lores: black for the Gilbert's and red for the red-lored whistler. The female Gilbert's whistler (23.5-32.2 g) has a pale grey throat and a white ring around the eye; her underparts can be lightly streaked. Both sexes are uniformly brownish-grey, and have a red iris and a black stubby bill (17–18 mm). Juveniles (30.9 g) are darker than adults, with tinges of brown, and have dark streaks on the breast and belly. Immatures are very similar to adult females except for their brown bill and dark brown iris. Care should be taken not to mistake the female and immature Gilbert's whistler for the female golden or western whistlers where they co-exist.

At one stage, Gilbert's whistler was divided into two subspecies: P. i. inornata to the east of the Flinders Ranges with greyish white underparts, and P. i. gilberti in the west with cinnamon and buff underparts; this variation is now considered clinal.

A study undertaken by Onley, Gardner and Symonds (2020) on possible larger appendages in whistlers caused by climate change (Allen's rule) from museum specimens collected between 1915 and 2013, found an increase in the body size of the Gilbert's whistler at higher latitudes, following Bergmann's rule.

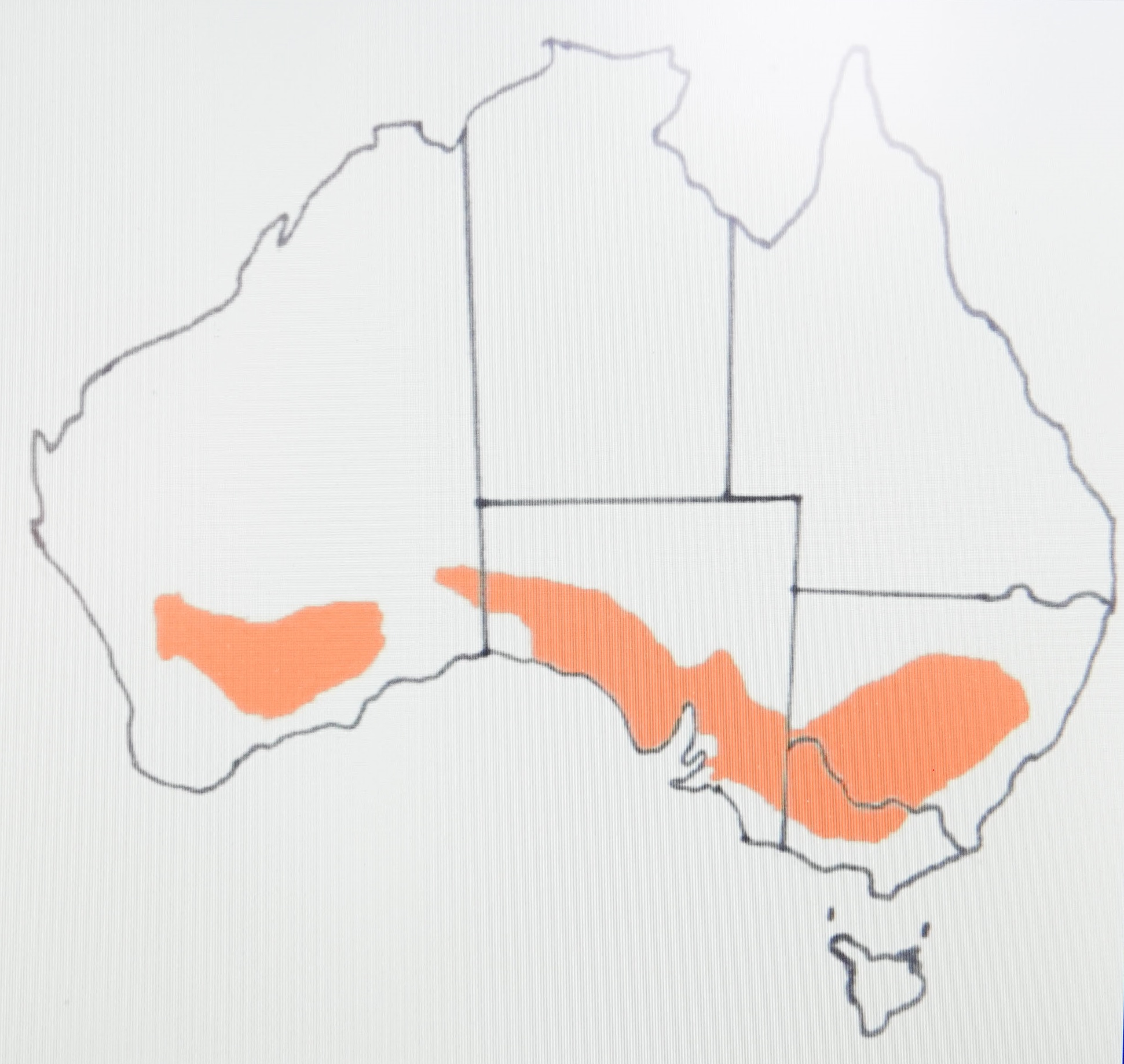
Distribution map

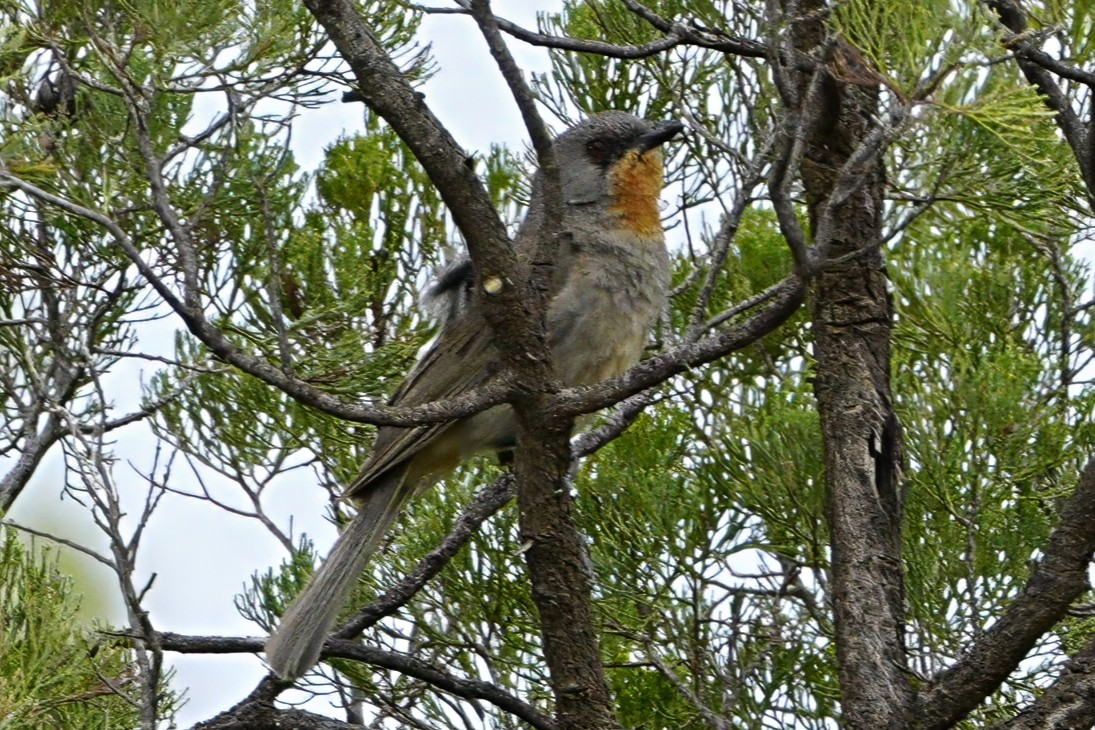
Photo taken at AWC Buckaringa Wildlife Sanctuary, South Australia, by Cameron Whiley in November 2025.

== Ecology ==
=== Diet ===
Gilbert's whistlers feed mostly on the ground, as does about half of all declining species of birds in southern Australia. This species also forages in understorey layers. They feed primarily on invertebrates, although fruit and seeds can also form part of its diet.

=== Nesting and clutch ===
Gilbert's whistlers erect a deep cup nest in a dense shrub, often on top of old babblers' nests. Both sexes build the nest, incubate two or three, sometimes four eggs over a period of 15 days, and look after the chicks. Young are altricial and nidicolous.

== Vocalisations ==
All whistlers are songsters, and Gilbert's whistler in particular, is more often heard than seen. Its loud, melodious and clear call can be heard at distances up to 900 m, mostly during the breeding season when it establishes a breeding territory. Its song is described as a series of swelling cheop, cheop, cheop repeated five to 20 times, with another ascending call er-WHIT, er-WHIT, er-WHIT similar to the rufous whistler, and also a more scratchy call eechowk, eechOWK, eeCHOWK.

== Habitat, distribution and threats ==
Gilbert's whistler inhabits semi-arid tall mallee with sparse shrubby understorey or prickly Acacia thickets and Casuarina woodlands, and is also found in thickets of Melaleuca and, occasionally, in taller eucalypt woodlands or forests. A study undertaken in 2017 on the effect of bushfires and prescribed burns on the distribution of 12 threatened bird species predicted that habitat burnt between 30 and 60 years approximately would be favoured by Gilbert's whistlers while habitat burnt more frequently or not burnt for more than 60 years would not readily suit this species.

The distribution of Gilbert's whistlers is scattered in the semi-arid parts of southern Western Australia and South Australia, northwest Victoria and central west New South Wales. No large scale movements were recorded for the species which is thought to be resident or sedentary with a high degree of site fidelity. It is therefore not surprising that this species is sensitive to disturbance, as described by Murphy following a study on the conservation value of small woodland remnants in New South Wales, where he noted that the distribution of Gilbert's whistler in this region is largely restricted to the remaining original vegetation. Another project undertaken by a bird banding group in the Charcoal Tank Nature Reserve in central west New South Wales sadly recorded the extinction of Gilbert's whistler in this 86-hectare (210-acre) patch of remnant vegetation during the 'Big Dry' in 2000–01. This local extinction, a classic example of the 'Extinction Debt', was mainly attributed to: habitat fragmentation, land clearing for agriculture during the last 100 years, introduced predators, increased competition from other native species, and drought periods exacerbated by climate change. Additional details on these threats are outlined on the NSW Government species profile page.

== Conservation ==
Of the four states in which Gilbert's whistler occurs, this species is listed as vulnerable only in New South Wales under the NSW Biodiversity Conservation Act 2016 based on population decrease in size and distribution. A conservation strategy was developed in 2015 as part of the Saving our Species program with some of the priority management areas including: restoring native vegetation, removing weeds, implementing actions to reduce the impact of noisy miners when deemed necessary, encouraging landholders to implement sensitive grazing practices, strip burning with refuge areas remaining unburnt for 25 years or more, raising public awareness of the importance of large old trees, revegetating, and identifying methods to improve soil quality.

Gilbert's whistler is not listed at national level under the Environment Protection and Biodiversity Conservation Act 1999, and is listed as least concern at international level under the IUCN Red List of Threatened Species 2016.

== Gallery ==
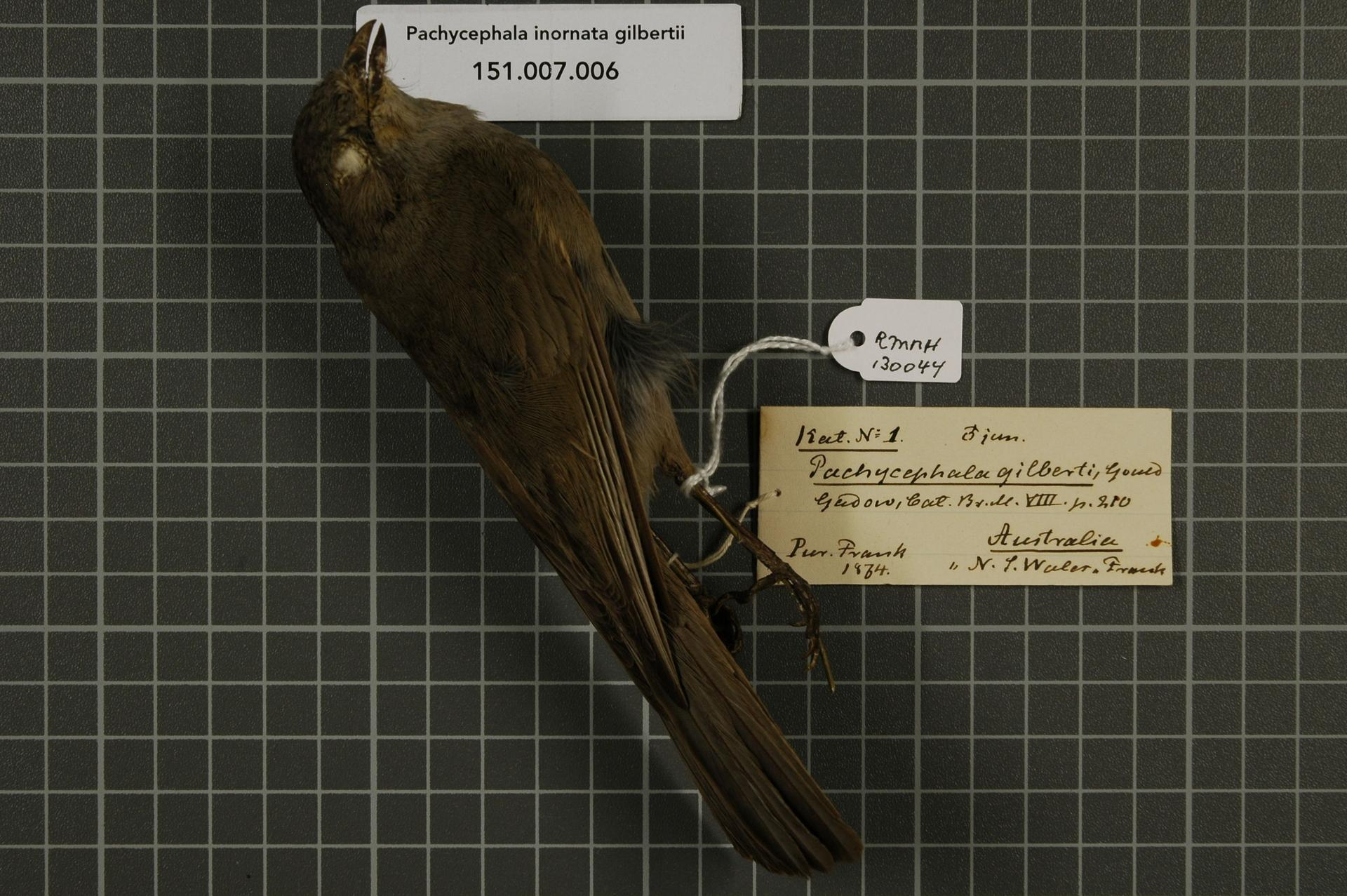
Bird skin specimen, Gilbert's whistler (Pachycephala inornata) (Gould, 1844)

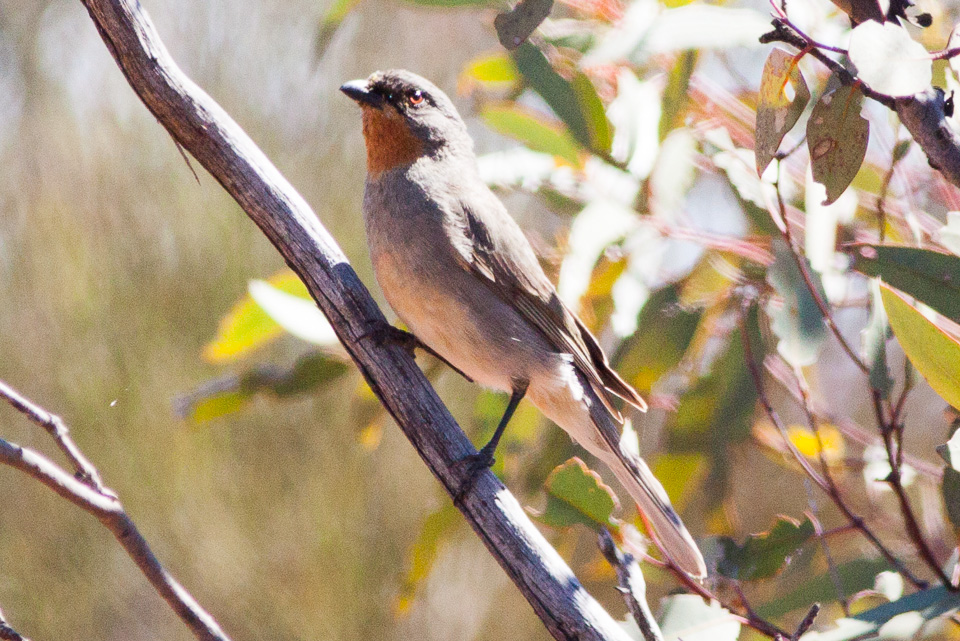
Male Gilbert's whistler (Pachycephala inornata)

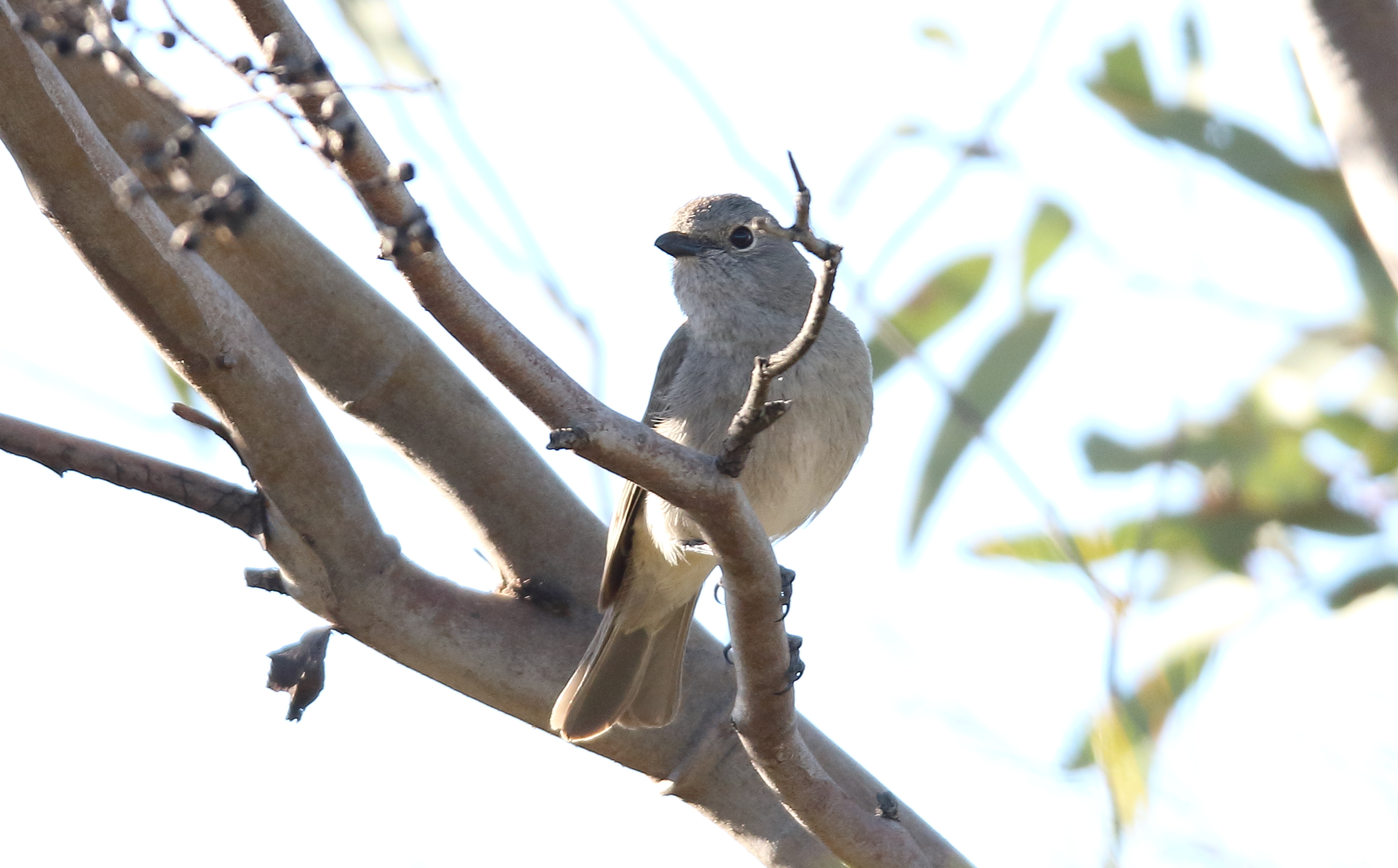
Female Gilbert's whistler (Pachycephala inornata)
