= Kathryn Harkup =

British chemist

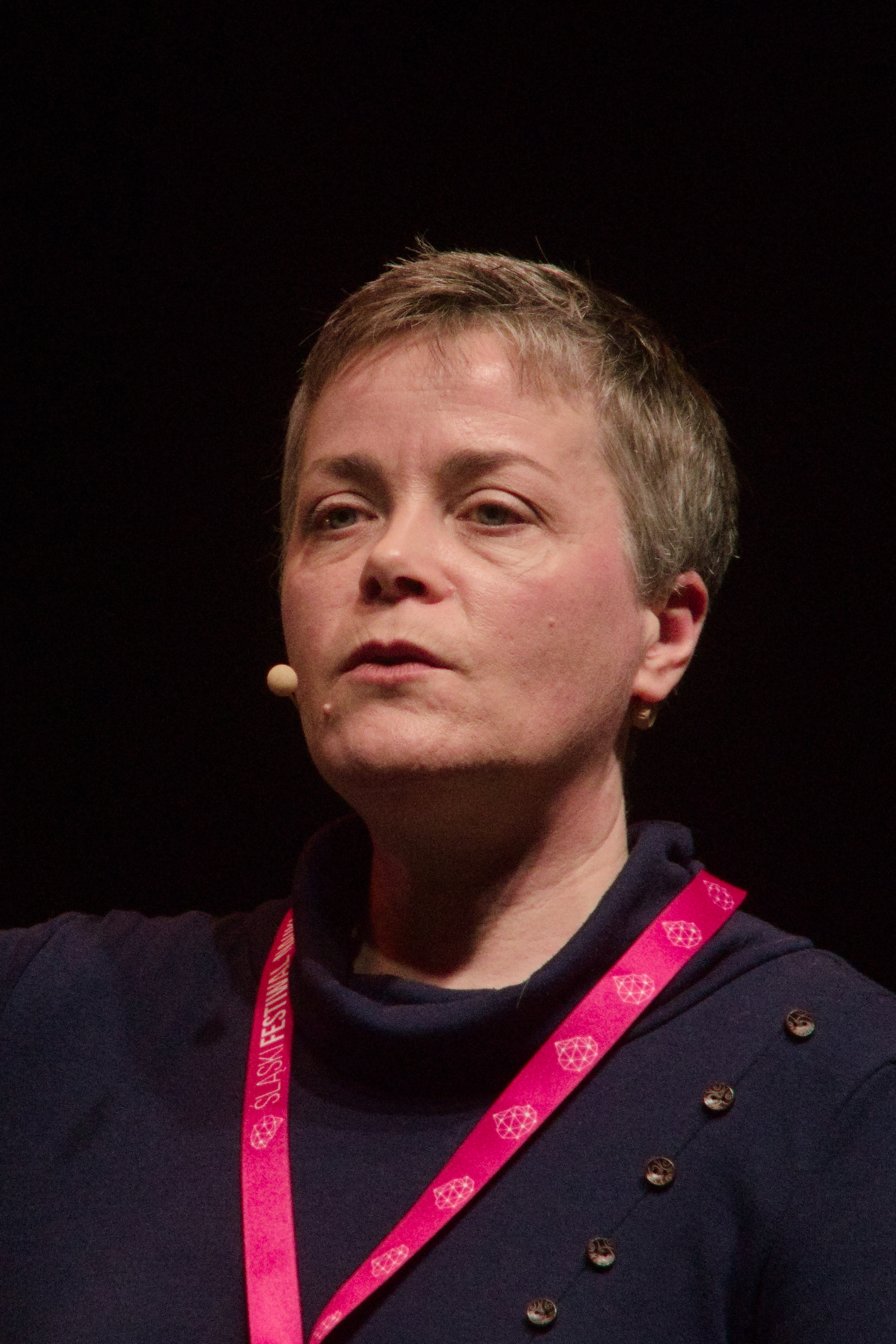
- Harkup in 2022
- Education: University of York (PhD)
- Known for: Science communication
- Scientific career
- Fields: Chemistry
- Website: harkup.co.uk

Kathryn Harkup is a British chemist and science communicator. She is known for writing books about science in popular culture and the history of science.

== Early life and education ==
Harkup completed her PhD and post-doctoral degree at the University of York.

== Career ==
After completing her studies, Harkup became a science communicator at the University of Surrey. She has written several books about the history of science in popular culture. In 2015, Harkup published A Is For Arsenic: The Poisons of Agatha Christie, which explores the scientific basis of the poisons used in Agatha Christie's novels. Harkup was inspired to write A Is For Arsenic because of her interest in Christie's mystery novels as a teenager, particularly those involving Hercule Poirot. As a science communicator, she noticed that young students were generally interested in "anything dangerous or disgusting", which further inspired the work. The book was nominated for an Agatha Award, and Mystery Readers International Macavity Awards. She subsequently wrote Making the Monster: The Science Behind Mary Shelley’s Frankenstein in 2018.

In 2020, Harkup published Death by Shakespeare: Snakebites, Stabbings and Broken Hearts. The book dealt with the portrayal of death in William Shakespeare's plays and the scientific understanding that went into his work. It received mostly positive reviews from critics. Publishers Weekly gave the book a starred review.

In 2021, she published the popular science book The Secret Lives of Elements, and the nonfiction Vampirology: The Science of Horror's Most Famous Fiend.

Harkup published Superspy Science: Science, Death and Tech in the World of James Bond in 2022, which dealt with depictions of technology in Ian Fleming's James Bond franchise.

== Personal life ==
Harkup lives in Surrey, England.
