= Popsicule =

Popsicule (also referred to as the Popsicule) is the Science in Popular Culture and Entertainment Hub of the Australian National University. Established in 2022 by Anna-Sophie Jürgens, a Senior Lecturer in science communication, it is based within the Australian National Centre for the Public Awareness of Science.

Through interdisciplinary research, teaching, and creative public engagement initiatives, the hub focuses on the cultural meanings of science, examining how popular culture shapes public discourse, understanding, and cultural ideas about science, as well as the relationship between science and society. Its activities include courses, publications, film screenings and discussions, the development of science communication formats, and collaborations with scientists, artists, and cultural practitioners.

In 2025, Popsicule received the Vice-Chancellor’s Award for Programs that Enhance Learning at ANU.

== History ==
Popsicule was established in 2022 at the Australian National University by Anna-Sophie Jürgens. It developed from Jürgens’s research on the cultural meanings of science, humour, and popular entertainment, as well as from her teaching in science communication and popular culture.

From its inception, Popsicule combined research, teaching, and public engagement activities, functioning as a platform for science engagement and research collaboration, a teaching laboratory, and a space for student publications. Its work has involved interdisciplinary and transdisciplinary collaboration between researchers, students, and creative practitioners, as well as fostering dialogue on science and science communication across disciplines and sectors. The hub’s activities have expanded to include public programmes, the development and testing of non-traditional research-based formats for science communication, and media engagement.

== Aims and approach ==
Popsicule’s work is grounded in the study of science as a cultural force with its own cultural life, with a focus on how meanings of science are produced, negotiated, and contested within popular culture and public media. Drawing on science communication, the history of science, cultural studies, popular entertainment studies, and related fields, the hub examines how scientific ideas, images and imaginaries of science and scientists, and visions of scientific pasts and futures circulate beyond laboratories and formal institutions. A central premise of Popsicule’s approach is that public understandings of science are shaped not only by information, but also by narrative, aesthetic, and emotional strategies. Through the analysis of film, television, comics, fiction, performance, visual art, and digital media, Popsicule investigates how science is conceptualised, performed, and culturally configured, and how these cultural expressions influence trust, authority, curiosity, and engagement in science–society relations.

The hub places particular emphasis on communicative and narrative strategies that move beyond dominant tropes, such as the “mad scientist” or techno-apocalyptic discourses. It foregrounds humour, wonder, hope, and creative play as analytical lenses for understanding how science is imagined, debated, and experienced in public culture. Within this framework, humour is treated as an analytical and diagnostic tool that reveals social expectations, anxieties, and values surrounding science.

Popsicule also examines how scientists are featured in, and participate in, popular culture. It explores how scientists engage with, respond to, and shape cultural narratives through collaboration with artists, filmmakers, writers, and designers, and how these exchanges contribute to the formation of scientific identities and the expansion of science’s role in public life.

Environmental knowledge and human relationships with non-human species form a further area of focus. Popsicule explores how popular culture communicates climate change, ecological urgency, and environmental responsibility, and how aesthetic experience can challenge human exceptionalism and foster alternative imaginaries of coexistence.

Methodologically, Popsicule operates at the intersection of humanities and science communication research, combining critical analysis with practice-based collaboration and experimentation. Popular culture is treated both as an object of study and as a site for research-led science communication, positioning science as embedded within broader cultural systems of meaning, performance, and imagination.

== Activities and initiatives ==
Popsicule’s activities span research, teaching, and public engagement, with a focus on developing and testing creative formats for science communication in collaboration with academic and cultural partners. A central initiative is Science. Art. Film., a programme of film screenings and discussions that brings together scientists, artists, and audiences to explore science themes through cinema and visual culture. The series, presented in partnership with the National Film and Sound Archive of Australia, combines curated screenings with expert commentary and public dialogue, examining how film reflects, shapes, and envisions scientific knowledge and imagination.

Popsicule’s collaboration with the online journal w/k – Between Science and Art constitutes a further strand of its activities, focusing on the intersection of science, science communication, and creative practice. This work includes the curation and publication of two article series on “Street Art, Science and Engagement” and “Visual Science Storytelling, Sequential Art and Illustrated Science Communication”, to which both artists and scientists contribute.

Teaching activities form a core component of Popsicule’s work. Two university courses are associated with the hub: Science in Fiction and Film and Science, Humour and Pop Culture. It also supports student-led publications and creative projects that engage with science through cultural media.

In addition to its academic and teaching programmes, Popsicule engages with wider publics through public seminars and workshops, festival contributions, podcasts, and media appearances. Members of the hub contribute to public discussions on science in popular culture through articles, interviews, and broadcast media, including contributions to outlets such as The Conversation, Fantasy/Animation, and the Australian Broadcasting Corporation.

Popsicule’s activities are supported by collaborations with national and international partners across academia, the arts, and the cultural sector, and include participation in public festivals, exhibitions, and community events such as the Uncharted Territory innovation festival, Comic-Con Canberra, and ACT Science Week, including workshops and public programmes.

== Research and publications ==
Popsicule contributes to research on science communication and popular culture, with a focus on the cultural dimensions of how science is communicated and experienced. Its work addresses areas including humour and comic performance in science, portrayals of scientists and scientific knowledge in film and television, visual and artistic approaches to communicating science, and environmental communication and aesthetics. The hub’s research also examines the role of narrative, metaphor, and genre in shaping public perceptions of science, as well as the ways in which popular culture influences trust, authority, and engagement in science–society relations. Through interdisciplinary and collaborative approaches, Popsicule contributes to scholarship in science communication, pop culture studies and related fields through journal articles, edited volumes, and public-facing publications.

=== Notable publications ===
==== Books ====
- Judd, K.; Gaul, B.; Jürgens, A.-S. (2025). Women Scientists in American Television Comedy: Beakers, Big Bangs and Broken Hearts. Palgrave Macmillan.
- Hemkendreis, A.; Jürgens, A.-S. (eds.) (2024). Communicating Ice through Popular Art and Aesthetics. Palgrave Macmillan.
- Jürgens, A.-S.; Hildbrand, M. (eds.) (2022). Circus and the Avant-Gardes: History, Imaginary, Innovation. Routledge.
- Jürgens, A.-S. (ed.) (2020). Circus, Science and Technology: Dramatising Innovation. Palgrave Macmillan.

==== Selected articles and book chapters ====
- Walsh, L.; Jürgens, A.-S. (2025). “The creation of superheroes and supervillains through alchemy, science accidents, and violent scientific delights”, in The Routledge Companion to Superhero Studies, ed. by Lorna Piatti-Farnell and Carl Wilson. Routledge, pp. 30–39.
- Kinsella, A.; Jürgens, A.-S. (2024). “Gender and terror tangled in the weeds: Poison Ivy between eco-feminism and eco-terrorism”. Journal of Graphic Novels and Comics.
- Jürgens, A.-S.; Fiadotava, A.; Clitheroe, C.-L. (2024). “Vaude-villain and violent funster: Harley Quinn and humour”. Journal of Graphic Novels and Comics.
- Jürgens, A.-S. (2023). “‘Human or Machine?’ Performing Androids, ‘Elektro-Homos,’ and the ‘Phroso’ and ‘Moto Phoso’ Manias on the Popular Stage around 1900”. Journal of Popular Culture.
- Santos, D.; Jürgens, A.-S. (2023). “From Harleen Quinzel to Harley Quinn: Science, Symmetry and Transformation”. Journal of Graphic Novels and Comics.
- Jürgens, A.-S.; Raman, S.; Hendershott, R.; Roberson, T.; Viaña, J. N.; Leach, J. (2023). “He Who Gets Slapped: How can clowning in film interrogate technoscientific culture and help enact the ideals of responsible innovation?”. Journal of Responsible Innovation.
- Jürgens, A.-S. (2020). “Batman and the World of Tomorrow: Yesterday’s Technological Future in the Animated Film Batman: Mask of the Phantasm”. Animation, 15(3), 246–259.
- Jürgens, A.-S.; Tscharke, D. C.; Brocks, J. (2021). “From Caligari to Joker: The Clown Prince of Crime’s Psychopathic Science”. Journal of Graphic Novels and Comics.

== Teaching and learning ==
Teaching is a central component of Popsicule’s activities, integrating research-led education with creative and practice-based approaches to science communication. The hub contributes to teaching in science communication and popular culture across the Australian National University and delivers Science, Humour and Pop Culture, an online course developed by its founder that serves as a central teaching platform for Popsicule’s approach. This course, together with the associated Science in Fiction and Film, examines how science is shaped and communicated through popular media such as film, television, comics, and fiction, and explores their influence on public perceptions of science. A distinctive feature of Popsicule’s teaching is its emphasis on creativity as a mode of inquiry and learning. Students are encouraged to work across conceptual and disciplinary boundaries, engaging with multiple perspectives and experimenting with different forms of analysis and communication. Popsicule’s teaching model places particular emphasis on experiential and practice-based learning. Students develop original projects, including research outputs and creative science communication formats such as video, visual media, and narrative-based work. The hub’s approach foregrounds co-learning, co-creation, and collaborative practice, with students working alongside researchers, artists, and cultural practitioners.

== Creative science engagement and communication ==
Popsicule develops and supports a range of creative science communication formats that combine research, storytelling, and public engagement. These projects – including Science Goes Pop, which was supported by Inspiring Australia ACT (Inspiring the ACT), the ACT Government and international collaborators – are often created in collaboration with artists, designers, and media practitioners, and function both as research outputs and as platforms for public engagement and teaching. Among these initiatives is Popsicule’s long-standing support of the Sci_Burst podcast. Founded in 2022 by science communicators Isabel Richards and Ella McCarthy, the podcast has been hosted on the Popsicule platform since its inception and has since developed into an independent science communication start-up. Popsicule and Sci_Burst continue to collaborate on projects and public engagement activities. Another strand of Popsicule’s work is the development of experimental formats that integrate art, design, and emerging technologies, including Ultra-Perception: Science goes pop, a project exploring interactive and immersive approaches such as augmented reality.

== Media coverage ==
Popsicule and its associated activities have received media coverage in national and international outlets, particularly in relation to its work on science communication through visual fiction, humour and science, and creative public engagement. Coverage has focused on topics such as mad scientists and violent clowns in comics and film, cinematic representations of science, and strategies for engaging the public imagination through programmes such as the Science. Art. Film. series. The hub’s work has been featured in outlets including Chemistry World, Australian Broadcasting Corporation, SBS German, and Wissenschaftskommunikation.de, as well as in university-based publications such as ANU Reporter. Popsicule-related research and projects have also been discussed in podcasts and media platforms focused on science communication and cultural analysis.

Selected examples include:

- “Cinematic Science: Film screenings that celebrate science, cinema and art”, Chemistry World (2024)
- “Spielberg, a tuba, and a shark named Bruce — the cultural impact of Jaws”, ABC Radio National (Big Ideas, 2024)
- “Clowns, horror and science fiction as a research subject”, SBS German (2025)
- “I didn’t even know my work was considered science communication”, Wissenschaftskommunikation.de (2023)
- “Science goes pop: where mad scientists meet the world”, ANU Reporter (2025)
- “Is Beetlejuice the comic king of parasites?”, ANU Reporter (2024)
- “Episode 2: Dr Anna-Sophie Jürgens/The one on Science”, Cutting Edge podcast (Australasian Humour Studies Research Network, (2024)
- “Dr Anna-Sophie Jürgens walks the tightrope between pop culture and science”, ANU College of Science & Medicine, Portrait (2023)

== Recognition ==
Popsicule’s teaching model has been recognised by the Australian National University through the 2025 Vice-Chancellor’s Award for Programs that Enhance Learning. In 2024, Popsicule was shortlisted as a finalist in the Science Engagement category of the Falling Walls Global Call, placing it among 30 finalists. Between 2023 and 2024, Popsicule was selected, through a competitive application process, to participate in and present at the Silbersalz Institute’s Science & Media Programme with a collaborative project focused on interdisciplinary science–art engagement. The work of Popsicule has also been recognised through invitations to present internationally, including an invited 2026 webinar hosted by the European Association for the Study of Literature, Culture and Environment (EASLCE). In 2026, it was featured in an invited seminar at the Innovative Genomics Institute at the University of California, Berkeley. Members of Popsicule have convened a panel at the Framing the Unreal comics conference in Venice (2024). Popsicule has also been presented internationally, including at the 2023 Public Communication of Science and Technology (PCST) conference, where it was featured as part of a session on novel approaches to science communication and engagement, and at the international conference Animal on Stage: Cultural Performances at the Zbigniew Raszewski Theatre Institute in Warsaw (2022).
