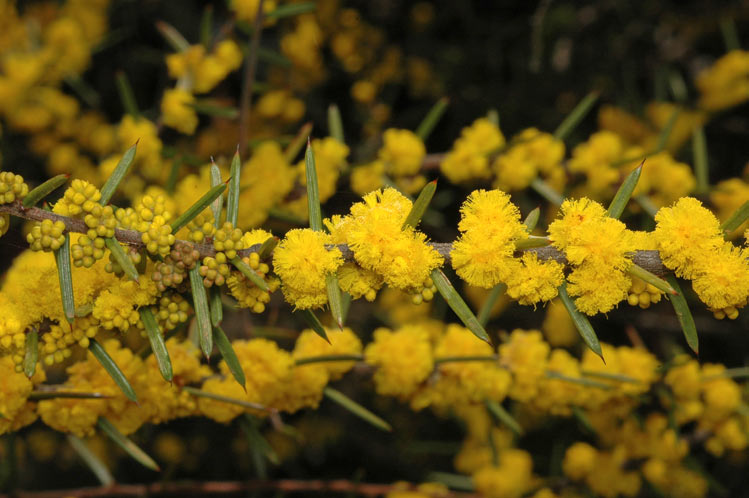

Scientific classification
- Kingdom: Plantae
- Clade: Embryophytes
- Clade: Tracheophytes
- Clade: Spermatophytes
- Clade: Angiosperms
- Clade: Eudicots
- Clade: Rosids
- Order: Fabales
- Family: Fabaceae
- Subfamily: Caesalpinioideae
- Clade: Mimosoid clade
- Genus: Acacia
- Species: A. rhigiophylla

Binomial name
- Acacia rhigiophylla F.Muell. ex Benth.
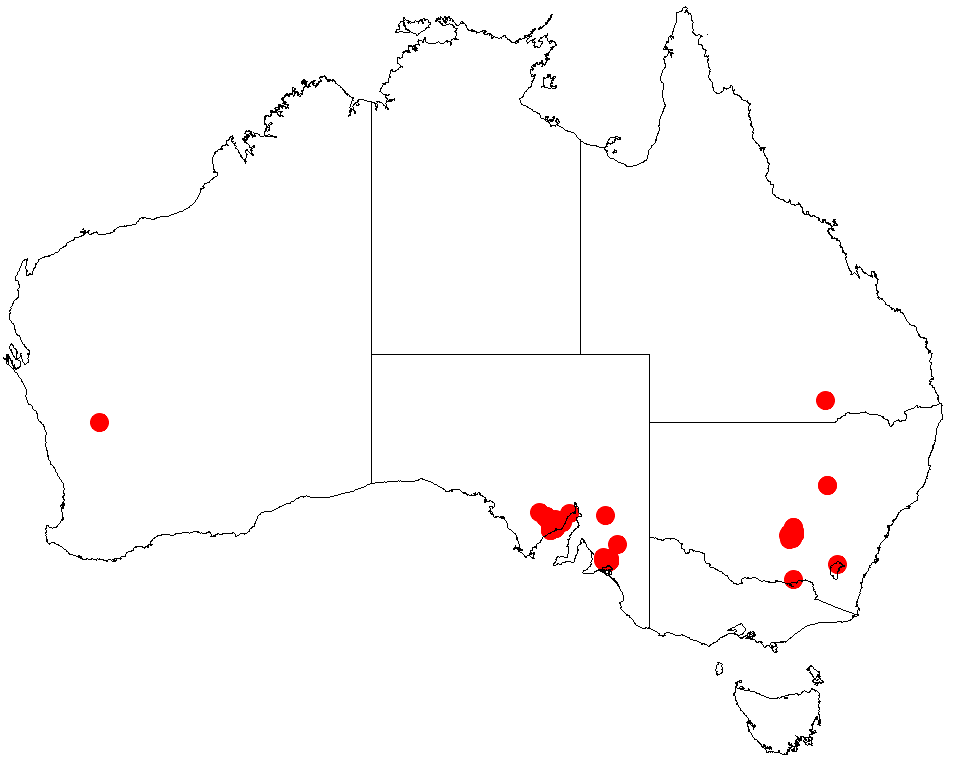
- Occurrence data from AVH

= Acacia rhigiophylla =

Dagger-leaf wattle

Species of plant

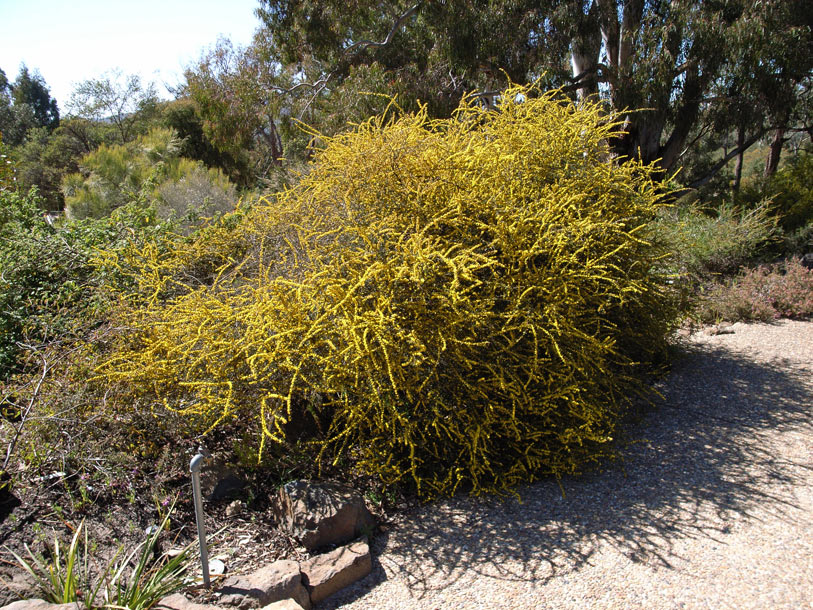
Habit in the Australian National Botanic Gardens

Acacia rhigiophylla, commonly known as dagger-leaf wattle, is a shrub belonging to the genus Acacia and the subgenus Juliflorae that is native to southern Australia.

== Description ==
The prickly and intricate shrub typically grows to a maximum height of 3 m (9.8 ft) and a width of around 2 mm (0.079 in). It has persistent sharp and rigid stipules along the branchlets that are slightly curved that are 1 to 2 mm (0.039 to 0.079 in) in length and shining brown in colour. The bark is brown in colour and quite roughened and flaky near the base of stems. Like most species of Acacia it has phyllodes rather than true leaves. The quadrangular, triangular or flattened phyllodes are usually slightly contracted toward the base and have a length of 7 to 30 mm (0.28 to 1.18 in) and a width of 1.2 to 2 mm (0.047 to 0.079 in). The rigid phyllodes are a dark green colour and noticeably pungent and have a total of three to six prominent veins. It blooms between September and October producing bright yellow flowers. The simple inflorescences are found on 1 to 2 mm (0.039 to 0.079 in) long stalks with cylindrical solitary flower-spikes that have a length of 0.5 to 1 mm (0.020 to 0.039 in) and contain 6 to 15 yellow flowers. The seed pods that form after flowering have a linear shape but are a little constricted between each of the seeds. The firmly chartaceous pods are very curved or coiled and have a length of up to 5.5 cm (2.2 in) and a width of around 2.5 mm (0.098 in) and have many longitudinal veins. The elliptic shaped seeds within the pods have a length of 3 to 4 mm (0.12 to 0.16 in).

Acacia colletioides) has a very similar habit to A. rhigiophylla but has a much wider range. Acacia oxycedrus has similar phyllodes but has much longer inflorescences.

== Taxonomy ==
The species was first formally described by George Bentham and Ferdinand von Mueller in 1855 as part of the work Plantae Muellerianae: Mimoseae as published by in Linnaea: ein Journal für die Botanik in ihrem ganzen Umfange, oder Beiträge zur Pflanzenkunde. It was reclassified as Racosperma rhigiophyllum by Leslie Pedley in 2003 then transferred back to genus Acacia in 2006.

== Distribution ==
It has a disjunct distribution parts of South Australia and New South Wales. In South Australia it is found in a limited area on the Eyre Peninsula and in the Murray region where it is usually a part of open scrub-land communities and is often associated with Eucalyptus socialis and Eucalyptus gracilis and is found growing in grey-brown calcareous loamy and hard alkaline red duplex soils.

== See also ==
- List of Acacia species
