= Scope (Australian TV series) =

- Title card for the fifth series, used as of June 2019
- Genre: Children's television series
- Presented by: Dr Rob Bell; Lee Constable; Isla Nakano
- Starring: Joel Gilmore
- Country of origin: Australia
- Original language: English
- No. of seasons: 5
- No. of episodes: 723

Production
- Executive producer: Drew Jarvis
- Producers: Stephen Bergin; Matt Grehan; Steph Frick; Nadia Russell; Tani Crotty; Jessica Harris; Leon Murray; Sean Elliot
- Camera setup: Multi-camera
- Running time: 30 minutes

Original release
- Network: Network 10 (2005–2013); 10 Peach (2013–2020)
- Release: 19 September 2005 – 20 September 2020

Scope is an Australian children science program. It premiered on Network 10 on 19 September 2005. The series aired on 10 Peach from 2013 to 2020.

On 3 February 2021, 10 announced that they had cancelled the show after 15 years.

== Presenters ==
- Dr Rob Bell (September 2005 – 13 August 2016)
- Lee Constable (20 August 2016 – 19 April 2020)
- Isla Nakano (17 May 2020 – 20 September 2020)

== Broadcast history ==
- The show premiered on 19 September 2005, Monday at 4pm.
- From 2005 until 2008, the show aired on Thursdays at 4pm.
- On 6 January 2009 – 30 December 2009, it aired Thursdays at 7.30am, Saturdays at 9am, and on Sundays at 7am.
- On 4 January 2010 – 22 February 2012, it aired Thursdays at 8am, and on Sundays at 7am.
- On 23 February 2012 – 31 October 2013, it aired on Thursdays at 4pm and on Saturdays at 9am.
- On 7 November 2013 – 2016, it aired on Thursdays at 8am on Eleven (now 10 Peach) due to launch of Wake Up and Studio 10, with repeats on Saturdays at 8am.
- In 2016 – 8 April 2018, it aired on Saturdays at 8.30am, with repeats on Thursdays at 8am.
- On 8 April 2018 – 20 September 2020, it moved to Sundays at 10 am, while repeats stayed on Thursdays at 8am.

== Series overview ==
Series	Episodes	Originally released	
Series	Episodes	First released	Last released
1	180	19 September 2005	18 February 2010
2	180	25 February 2010	2013
3	180	2014	2016
4	99	8 July 2017	2 June 2019
5	58	9 June 2019	20 September 2020

=== Series 5 ===
No. overall	No. in season	Title	Original release date
666	1	"Insects & Spiders"	9 June 2019
667	2	"Creative Science"	16 June 2019
668	3	"Sustainable Science"	23 June 2019
669	4	"Hands On"	30 June 2019
670	5	"Chemical Science"	7 July 2019
671	6	"Life Cycle Science"	14 July 2019
672	7	"What If?"	21 July 2019
673	8	"Pets"	28 July 2019
674	9	"Medical Science"	4 August 2019
675	10	"How Stuff Works"	11 August 2019
676	11	"Apocalypse Survival"	18 August 2019
677	12	"Myths & Mysteries"	25 August 2019
678	13	"Pranks"	1 September 2019
679	14	"Brain & Mental Health"	8 September 2019
680	15	"Sci Fi"	15 September 2019
681	16	"Inventions"	22 September 2019
682	17	"Crime Science"	29 September 2019
683	18	"Science on the Street"	6 October 2019
684	19	"Indigenous Science"	13 October 2019
685	20	"Farm Science"	20 October 2019
686	21	"Halloween"	27 October 2019
687	22	"Gaming"	3 November 2019
688	23	"Superhero Science"	10 November 2019
689	24	"Citizen Science"	17 November 2019
690	25	"Music"	24 November 2019
691	26	"Junior Scientists"	1 December 2019
692	27	"Sport Science"	8 December 2019
693	28	"The Reef"	15 December 2019
694	29	"Christmas Special!"	21 December 2019
695	30	"Mega Stuff"	29 December 2019
696	31	"Speed Science"	12 January 2020
697	32	"Tech"	19 January 2020
698	33	"Women in STEM"	9 January 2020
699	34	"Tech in our Lives"	16 February 2020
700	35	"Plants"	23 February 2020
701	36	"Sight and Sound"	1 March 2020
702	37	"Lee Constable and the Core of Truth"	8 March 2020
703	38	"Mammal Park"	15 March 2020
704	39	"Creepy Crawlies"	22 March 2020
705	40	"Climate Solutions"	29 March 2020
706	41	"Digestion"	5 April 2020
707	42	"The Emotional Rollercoaster"	12 April 2020
708	43	"The Grand FinaLee"	19 April 2020
709	44	"Underwater Science"	26 April 2020
710	45	"Ancient Science"	3 May 2020
711	46	"Do You Speak Science?"	10 May 2020
712	47	"A New Scope!"	17 May 2020
713	48	"Pandemic!"	24 May 2020
714	49	"The Perfect Storm"	31 May 2020
715	50	"That 70s Scope!"	7 June 2020
716	51	"Scope Goes Nuclear"	14 June 2020
717	52	"Science At Home"	9 August 2020
718	53	"Backyard Science"	16 August 2020
719	54	"That's Scope Random"	23 August 2020
720	55	"Fashion"	30 August 2020
721	56	"The Deep Ocean"	6 September 2020
722	57	"The Science of Sleep"	13 September 2020
723	58	"The Brain"	20 September 2020

== See also ==
- Totally Wild
- Toasted TV
- Gamify (TV series)
- Crocamole
- Puzzle Play
- Wurrawhy
- In the Box
- List of Australian television series
