= A Is For Arsenic: The Poisons of Agatha Christie =

Popular science book about poisons

- Author: Kathryn Harkup
- Illustrator: Neil Stevens, Julia Percival
- Language: English
- Subject: Poisons, crime fiction
- Published: 2015 (Bloomsbury)
- Publication place: United Kingdom, United States
- Media type: Print (hardcover)
- Pages: 320 (hardcover)
- ISBN: 978-1-4729-1130-8
- OCLC: 898419172

A Is For Arsenic: The Poisons of Agatha Christie is a popular science book by Kathryn Harkup. It discusses Agatha Christie's use of poisons in her crime fiction. A follow up book, V Is For Venom: Agatha Christie's Chemicals of Death, was published in 2025.

== Synopsis ==
Harkup provides a short background to Christie's knowledge of poisons as a result of her training as a pharmaceutical dispenser, and then discusses fourteen individual poisons - their characteristics, history, Christie's use of them in an exemplar work, real life criminal cases or investigations, and a more detailed pharmacological mechanism of action. The fourteen poisons, and their corresponding Christie works, are:

- Arsenic, in Murder is Easy
- Belladonna, in The Labours of Hercules
- Cyanide, in Sparkling Cyanide
- Digitalis, in Appointment with Death
- Eserine, in Crooked House
- Hemlock, in Five Little Pigs
- Monkshood, in 4:50 from Paddington
- Nicotine, in Three Act Tragedy
- Opium, in Sad Cypress
- Phosphorus, in Dumb Witness
- Ricin, in Partners in Crime
- Strychnine, in The Mysterious Affair at Styles
- Thallium, in The Pale Horse
- Veronal, in Lord Edgware Dies

== Reception ==
Kirkus Reviews stated "Technical explanations will daunt average readers with little knowledge of chemistry... but the narrative is informative, and the author's easy style of writing makes up for the slow bits," additionally noting the inclusion of comparisons between Christie's portrayal of the poisonings and real-life incidents.

For the audiobook adaption read by Beth Chalmers, Kirkus said "the subject matter itself is grim, but Chalmers's buoyant tones perfectly suit the well-researched and good-humored text."

Both Library Journal and Publishers Weekly commented of the overall avoidance of spoilers for the mysteries. Publishers Weekly recommended the book for "mystery fans, true crime readers, and lovers of popular science."

The book was a finalist for both the Macavity Award for Best Mystery Non-fiction/Critical Book and the 2015 Agatha Award for Best Non-fiction.

== Sources ==
- Broglie, Peter (2016). "An Arresting Alphabet". American Scientist. 104 (4): 251–252. doi:10.1511/2016.121.251. ISSN 0003-0996. JSTOR 44808949.
- Marshall, Vicki (1 October 2015). "A is for arsenic: the poisons of Agatha Christie". chemistryworld.com. Royal Society of Chemistry. Archived from the original on 23 March 2025.
- Twilley, Nicola (8 September 2015). "Agatha Christie and the Golden Age of Poisons". The New Yorker. Archived from the original on 24 May 2025.
- Kemp, Peter (22 November 2015). "A is for Arsenic: The Poisons of Agatha Christie by Kathryn Harkup". The Sunday Times. Gale A435236792. Full access available to users of The Wikipedia Library.
- "Q&A with A is for Arsenic author, Kathryn Harkup". agathachristie.com. 23 November 2015. Archived from the original on 11 July 2025.
