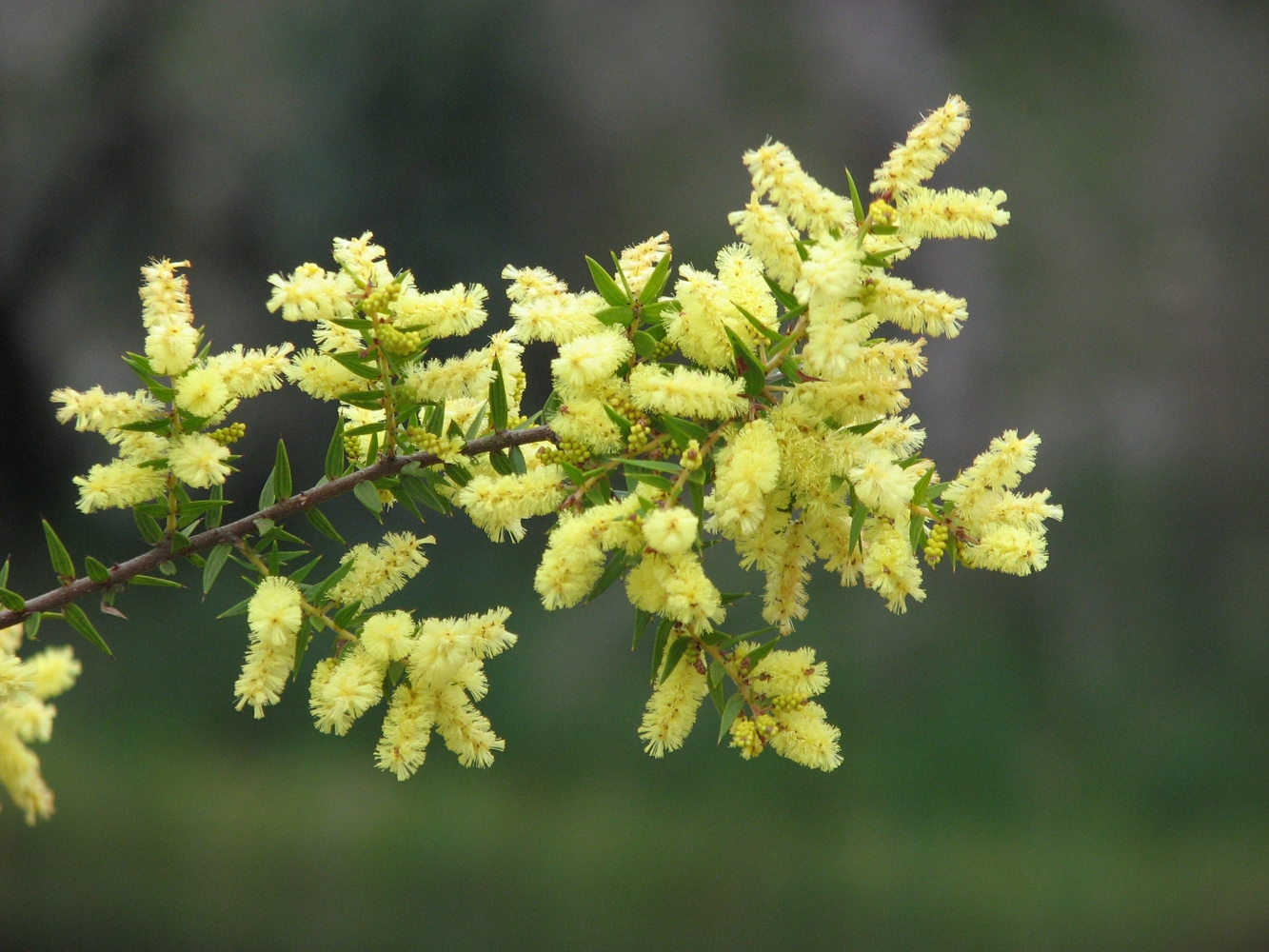
- In Bunyip State Park

Scientific classification
- Kingdom: Plantae
- Clade: Tracheophytes
- Clade: Angiosperms
- Clade: Eudicots
- Clade: Rosids
- Order: Fabales
- Family: Fabaceae
- Subfamily: Caesalpinioideae
- Clade: Mimosoid clade
- Genus: Acacia
- Species: A. oxycedrus

Binomial name
- Acacia oxycedrus Sieber ex DC.
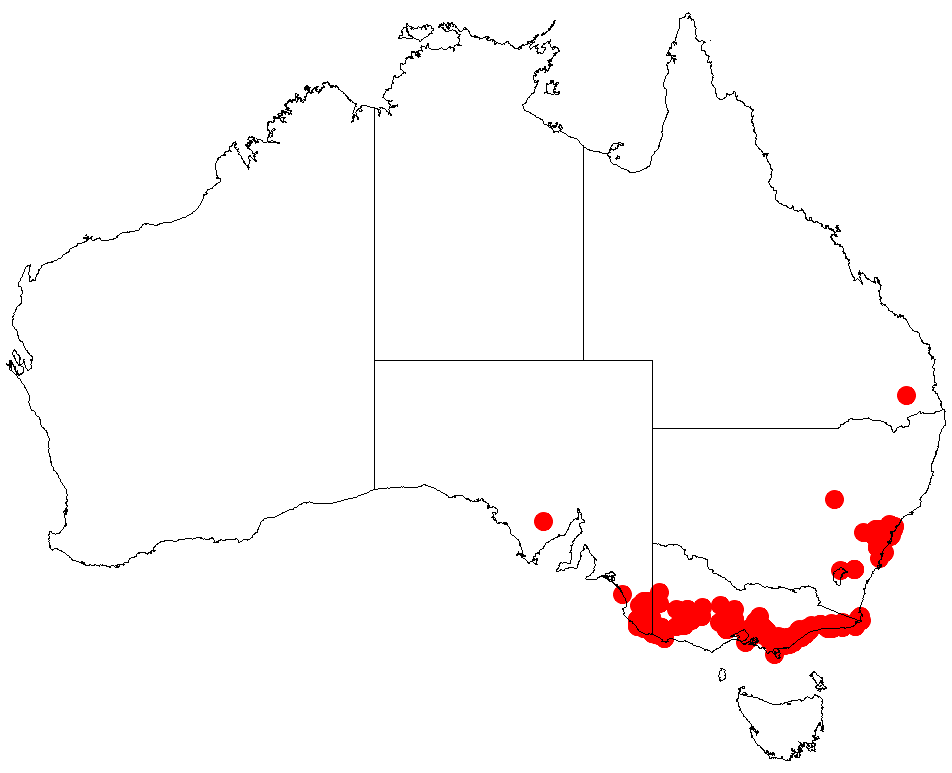
- Occurrence data from AVH

Synonyms
- Acacia oxycedrus Sieber ex DC. var. oxycedrus; Acacia taxifolia Lodd., G.Lodd. & W.Lodd. nom. illeg.; Hecatandra oxycedrus (Sieber ex DC.) Raf.; Racosperma oxycedrus (Sieber ex DC.) Pedley

= Acacia oxycedrus =

Spike wattle

Species of plant

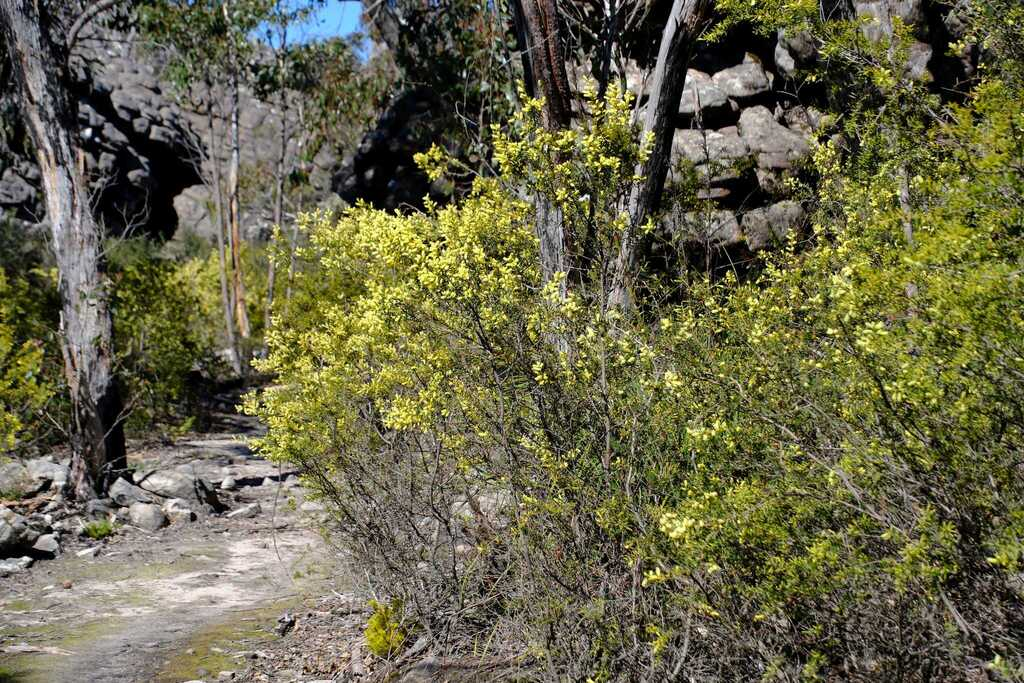
Habit at Halls Gap

Acacia oxycedrus, commonly known as spike wattle, is a species of flowering plant in the family Fabaceae, and is endemic to the south-east of mainland Australia. It is a prickly, erect, spreading or contorted tree or shrub with hairy young stems, crowded, sessile linear, lance-shaped or tapering phyllodes, dense spikes of golden yellow flowers and cylindrical, woody pods.

== Description ==
Acacia oxycedrus is a prickly, erect, spreading or contorted tree or shrub that typically grows to a height of up to 10 m (33 ft) and often has its young stems covered with soft hairs. Its phyllodes are crowded, sessile, linear, lance-shaped or tapered, 10–40 mm (0.39–1.57 in) long,1.5–4 mm (0.059–0.157 in) wide, and mostly glabrous with a sharp point on the end. There are three to five veins on the phyllodes and prominent, spiny or bristly-like, rigid stipules 1–3 mm (0.039–0.118 in) long at the base. The flowers are borne in spikes 15–50 mm (0.59–1.97 in) long on peduncles 3–12 mm (0.12–0.47 in) long, each spike with densely arranged golden yellow flowers. Flowering occurs from June to November, and the pods are cylindrical or slightly compressed, 60–110 mm (2.4–4.3 in) long, 4–8 mm (0.16–0.31 in) wide, woody and longitudinally wrinkled. The seeds are elliptic, 3.5–5 mm (0.14–0.20 in) long with a top-shaped aril.

== Taxonomy ==
Acacia oxycedrus was first formally described in 1825 by Augustin Pyramus de Candolle in his Prodromus Systematis Naturalis Regni Vegetabilis from an unpublished description by Franz Sieber. The specific epithet (oxycedrus) refers to the species' likeness to prickly cedar (Juniperus oxycedrus).

== Distribution and habitat ==
Spike wattle grows in heath, woodland and forest, ranging from far south-eastern South Australia, through southern and eastern Victoria to the Blue Mountains in New South Wales, the far south coast and to north of Sydney.

== Use in horticulture ==
The shrub is available commercially but can be propagated by seed scarification or using boiling water. It grows well in open sun and in a well drained position in most soil types. It is frost hardy and useful for road batters or as a screen or hedge plant that will form an impenetrable barrier.

== See also ==
- List of Acacia species
