= Lee Constable =

Australian science communicator

- Born: New South Wales, Australia
- Education: Australian National University (BSc/BA, Honours; MSc Science Communication Outreach)
- Occupations: Science communicator, television presenter, children's author, biologist
- Years active: 2010s–present
- Known for: Scope (Network Ten, 2016–2020)
- Notable work: How to Save the Whole Stinkin' Planet (2019); How to Save the Whole Blinkin' Planet (2024)
- Awards: Alinta Energy – CEF Alumnus of the Year (2019)

Lee Constable is a science communicator, television presenter, children's author, and biologist who lives and works in Australia. She is best known for her work as a presenter on Scope between 2016 and 2020, Network Ten's science show aimed at children aged 7–13.

== Early life and education ==
Constable grew up on a sheep farm in New South Wales. She undertook a double degree in science and arts, followed by honours in biology at Australian National University in Canberra. This was followed by a Master of Science Communication with the Australian National Centre for the Public Awareness of Science.

== Career ==
As part of her Master of Science Communication program, Constable toured remote areas of Australia performing science shows involving fire as part of the Questacon Science Circus. She started SoapBox, a youth-run radio show on sustainability and social justice.

Constable was the host of Scope, Network Ten's science show for children aged 7–13, from 2016 to 2020. Produced in association with CSIRO, the show aired on Network 10's channel 10 Peach. With Constable as presenter, the show became 'more intentionally accessible to kids who might not consider themselves stand-out students.'

In 2018, she was part of the largest all-female Antarctica expedition with Homeward Bound.

She also founded Co-Lab, an organisation that connects scientists and street artists to create live public science communication events, such as street art. She has spoken in industry events, including the Australian Science Communicators conference. She was selected by the Emerging Producer Program by the World Congress of Science and Factual Producers in 2018. She was awarded '2019 Alinta Energy – CEF Alumnus of the Year' by the Country Education Foundation of Australia.

In 2019, to tie in with World Environment Day, Penguin published Constable's book How to Save the Whole Stinkin' Planet, illustrated by James Hart, under its Puffin imprint.

She worked as a social media producer for The Conversation from 2022-2023 presenting TikTok and Instagram videos that translate the publication's articles for social media audiences.

In 2024 she published her second book, 'How to Save the Whole Blinkin' Planet: A renewable energy adventure' with Penguin Random House Australia.

Constable regularly hosts webinars for Refraction Media's Careers with STEM magazine.

== Queered Science Communication ==
Constable has also been doing a diverse array of queered science communication, since 2023. This is primarily through their drag persona and "Edutainer" King Milton Mango. Along with being a fairly active Instagram personality, Milton Mango has been described as embodying enlightened white 'Bogan' masculinity in relation to the environment and sustainability, and attempts to "elicit joy" in his audiences through humorous drag comedy, when engaging with high-anxiety topics like climate change. Milton has performed alongside other queer science communicators Dr Naomi Koh Belic (stem cell biology) and drag personas, Dyan Tai (Sydney musician), Radha La Bia (biomedical science, Shahmen Suku), and Diva Attenbra (wildlife biology, Dr Matt Davis) in the "The Drag Experiment", during the 2023 Sydney Mardi Gras.

Milton is also involved in the realm of formal queer science communication as both an agent of delivery as well as a subject of research. Lee is currently undertaking a Creative Practice PhD focusing on climate communication through comedic drag performance on social media. Their early research was presented via public, comedic dialogue between Milton and award-winning environmental journalist and author, Zoe Kean, at the 18th Biennial Conference on Communication and Environment, in Tasmania, 2025.
