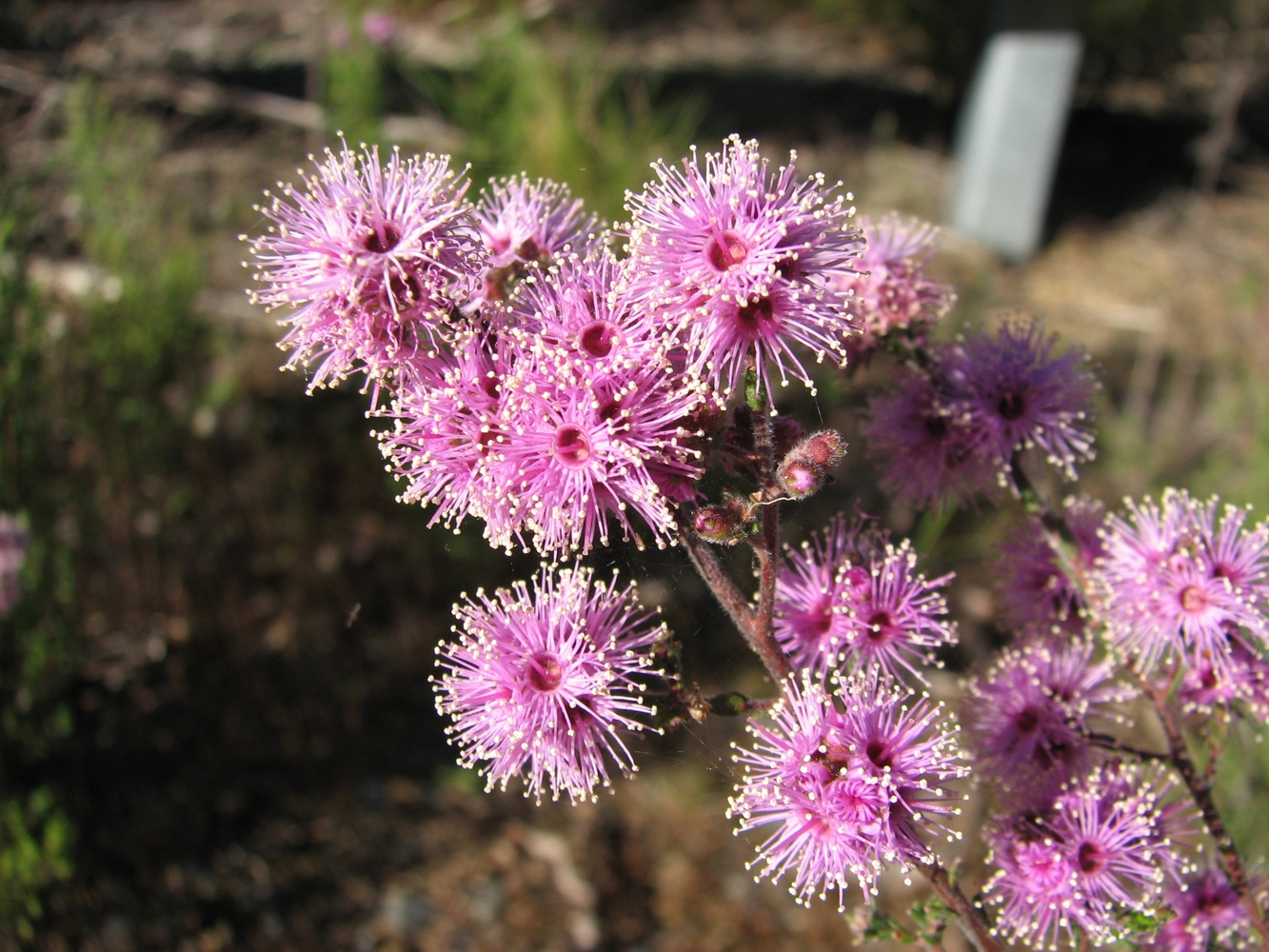
- Kunzea parvifolia Mount Buffalo National Park, Victoria

Scientific classification
- Kingdom: Plantae
- Clade: Tracheophytes
- Clade: Angiosperms
- Clade: Eudicots
- Clade: Rosids
- Order: Myrtales
- Family: Myrtaceae
- Genus: Kunzea
- Species: K. parvifolia

Binomial name
- Kunzea parvifolia Schauer

= Kunzea parvifolia =

Violet kunzea

Species of flowering plant

Kunzea parvifolia, commonly known as the violet kunzea, is a flowering plant in the myrtle family, Myrtaceae and is endemic to eastern Australia. It is a wiry shrub with small, narrow leaves and clusters of pink to purple flowers in spring.

== Description ==
Kunzea parvifolia is a wiry shrub which usually grows to a height of 0.5–1.5 m (2–5 ft) with its young branches covered with soft hairs. The leaves are linear to narrow lance-shaped and more or less pressed against the stem. They are 1–4 mm (0.04–0.2 in) long, about 1 mm (0.04 in) wide with a petiole less than 1 mm (0.04 in) long and are covered with soft hairs when young. The flowers are arranged in clusters of mostly three to eight on the ends of the branches. The floral cup is 1.5–2.5 mm (0.06–0.1 in) long and more or less glabrous. There are egg-shaped bracts 2.5–3.5 mm (0.098–0.14 in) long, about 1 mm (0.04 in) wide and paired bracteoles at the base of the flowers. The sepal lobes are triangular to egg-shaped, about 1.5 mm (0.06 in) long and pointed. The petals are pink to mauve, rarely white, egg-shaped to almost round, about 2 mm (0.08 in) long and there 30 to 40 stamens which are 2–3.5 mm (0.08–0.1 in) long. The style is 2.5–3.5 mm (0.098–0.14 in) long. Flowering mostly occurs in October and November and the fruit are urn-shaped capsules which are about 2 mm (0.08 in) long and wide.

== Taxonomy and naming ==
Kunzea parvifolia was first formally described in 1844 by Johannes Conrad Schauer and the description was published in Johann Lehmann's Plantae Preissianae. The specific epithet (parvifolia) is derived from the Latin words parvus meaning "small" and folium meaning "leaf".

== Distribution and habitat ==
This kunzea grows in forest in heath and forest in eastern New South Wales south from Torrington and in Victoria, mainly in the north-east but with isolated locations further west.
