= Public awareness of science =

Aspect of education and communication

Public awareness of science (PAS) is a comprehensive concept encompassing all aspects of the awareness, attitudes, behaviors, opinions, and activities that comprise the relations between the general public or lay society as a whole and scientific knowledge and organization. This concept is also known as public understanding of science (PUS), or more recently, public engagement with science and technology (PEST). This approach is a recent development in the field of science communication research, which aims to explore the intricate relationships and interconnections between science, technology, and innovation on the one hand, and the general public on the other. Initially, research in this domain concentrated on enhancing the public's understanding of scientific subjects, adhering to the principles of the information deficit model of science communication. However, this model has since been largely disregarded by researchers in the field of science communication. Instead, there is an increasing emphasis on understanding how the public chooses to use scientific knowledge and on the development of interfaces to mediate between expert and lay understandings of an issue. Newer frameworks of communicating science include the dialogue and the participation models. The dialogue model aims to create spaces for conversations between scientists and non-scientists to occur while the participation model aims to include non-scientists in the process of science.

== Major themes ==
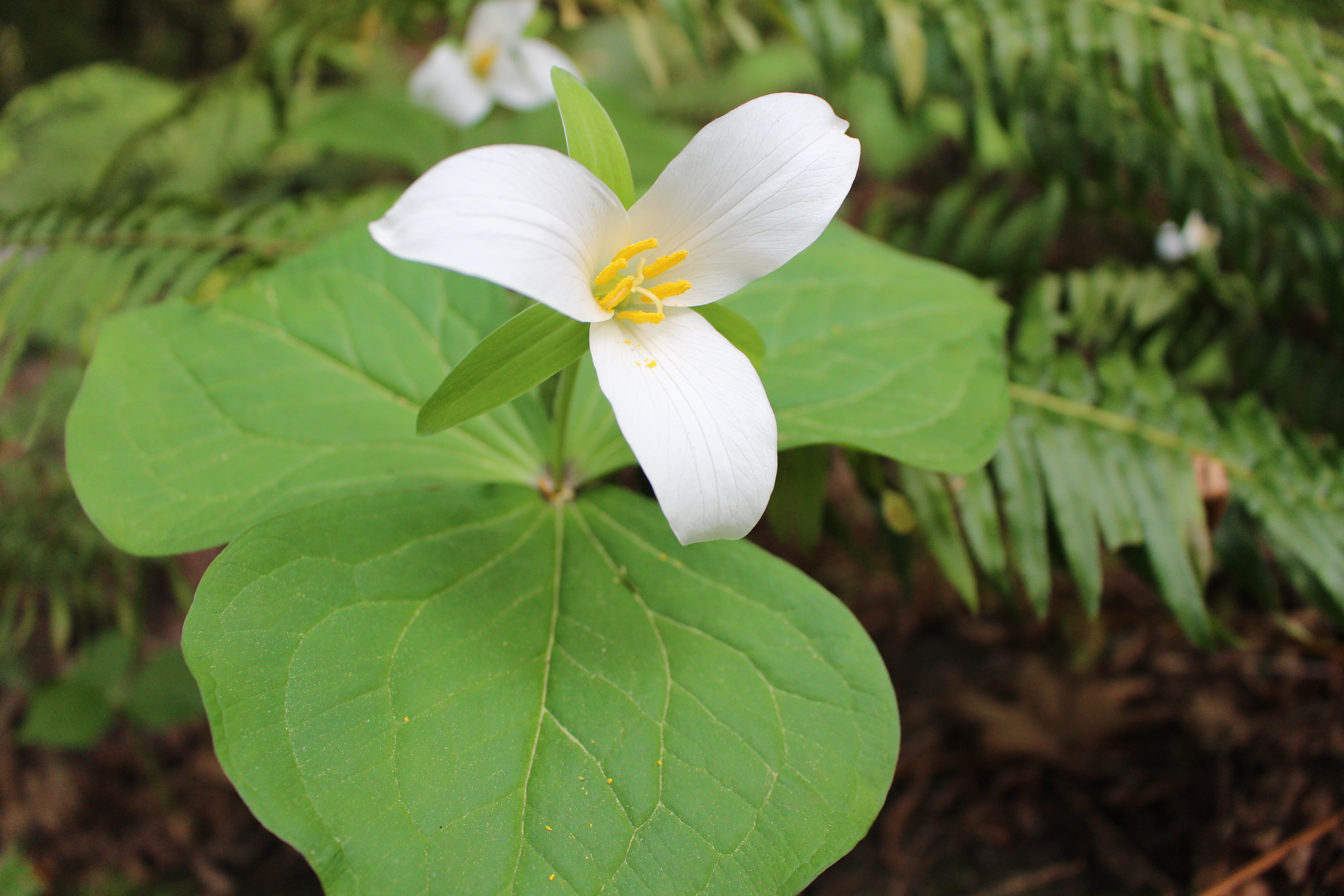
Photo taken during a Citizen Science Bioblitz

The area integrates a series of fields and themes such as:

- Citizen science
- Consumer education
- Fixed and mobile science exhibits
- Media and science (medialisation of science)
- Public controversies over science and technology
- Public tours of research and development (R&D) parks, manufacturing companies, etc.
- Science and art
- Science communication in the mass media, Internet, radio, films and television programs
- Science education for adults
- Science fairs in schools and social groups
- Science festivals
- Science in popular culture
- Science in text books and classrooms
- Science museums, aquaria, planetaria, zoological parks, botanical gardens, etc.
- Science social movements

Important lines of research are how to raise public awareness and public understanding of science and technology. Also, learning how the public feels and knows about science generally as well as individual subjects, such as genetic engineering, or bioethics. Research by Matthew Nisbet highlights several challenges in science communication, including the paradox that scientific success can create either trust or distrust in experts in different populations and that attitudes of trust are shaped by mostly socioeconomic rather than religious or ideological differences. A 2020 survey by the Pew Research Center found varying levels of trust in science by country, political leanings, and other factors.

== Bodmer report ==
The publication of the Royal Society's' report The Public Understanding of Science (or Bodmer Report) in 1985 is widely held to be the birth of the Public Understanding of Science movement in Britain. The report led to the founding of the Committee on the Public Understanding of Science and a cultural change in the attitude of scientists to outreach activities.

== Models of engagement ==
=== Contextualist model ===
In the 1990s, a new perspective emerged in the field with the classic study of Cumbrian Sheep Farmers' interaction with the Nuclear scientists in England. Brian Wynne demonstrated how the experts were ignorant or disinterested in taking into account the lay knowledge of the sheep farmers while conducting field experiments on the impact of the Chernobyl nuclear fallout on the sheep in the region. Because of this shortcoming from the side of the scientists, local farmers lost their trust in them. The experts were unaware of the local environmental conditions and the behaviour of sheep and this has eventually led to the failure of their experimental models. Following this study, scholars have studies similar micro-sociological contexts of expert-lay interaction and proposed that the context of knowledge communication is important to understand public engagement with science. Instead of large scale public opinion surveys, researchers proposed studies informed by sociology of scientific knowledge (SSK). The contextualist model focuses on the social impediments in the bidirectional flow of scientific knowledge between experts and laypersons/communities.

=== Deliberative model ===
Scholars like Sheila Jasanoff have advanced the debate around public engagement with science by leveraging the theory of deliberative democracy to analyze the public deliberation of and participation in science through various institutional forms. Proponents of greater public deliberation argue it is a basic condition for decision making in democratic societies, even on science and technology issues. There are also attempts to develop more inclusive participatory models of technological governance in the form of consensus conferences, citizen juries, extended peer reviews, and deliberative mapping.

=== Civic science model ===
Some scholars have identified a new era of "post-normal science" (PNS) in which many scientific discoveries carry high stakes if risks are estimated incorrectly within a broader social context that has a high degree of uncertainty. This PNS era requires a new approach to public engagement efforts and requires a reevaluation of the underlying assumptions of "public engagement", especially with emerging science and technology issues, like CRISPR gene editing, that have the potential to become "wicked problems". These "wicked" issues often require regulatory and policy decisions that have no single correct solution and often involve numerous interest groups – none of whom are clearly positioned to decide and resolve the problem. Policy and regulatory decisions around these scientific issues are inherently political and must balance trade-offs between the scientific research, perceptions of risk, societal needs, and ethical values. While scientists can provide factual answers to research questions and mathematical estimates of risk, many considerations surrounding these wicked science and technology issues have no factual answer. The unidirectional deficit model of simply educating the public on theses issues is insufficient to address these complex questions, and some scholars have proposed scientists adopt a culture of civic science: "broad public engagement with issues that arise at the many intersections between science and society." An emphasis is placed on developing an iterative engagement model that actively seeks to incorporate groups who stand to be adversely effected by a new technology and conducting this engagement away from universities so that it can be done on the public's terms with the public's terms. Other scholars have emphasized that this model of public engagement requires that the public be able to influence science, not merely be engaged by it, up to the point of being able to say "no" to research that does not align with the broader public's values. Under the civic science model, there are five key lessons for scientists committed to public engagement:

1. Establish why you want to engage with the public and clearly identify your goals.
2. Seek out and engage with a broad, diverse range of groups and perspectives and center engagement on listening to these groups.
3. Work cooperatively with groups to establish common definitions to avoid the perception that researchers are being disingenuous by relying on semantic differences between expert and lay interpretations of vocabulary to ensure the public "supports" their position.
4. Working to tilt public debates in favor of the priorities and values of researchers will not lead to consistent "best" decisions because wicked science and technology problems will have different considerations and perspectives depending on the application and cultural context.
5. Meaningfully engage as early as possible; engagement must begin early enough in the research process that the public's views can shape both the research and implementation of findings

== Public understanding of science ==
Social scientists use various metrics to measure public understanding of science, including:

=== Factual knowledge ===
The key assumptions is that the more individual pieces of information a person is able to retrieve, the more that person is considered to have learned.

Examples of measurement:

- Recognition: Answering a specific question by selecting the correct answer out a list
- Cued recall: Answering a specific question without a list of choices
- Free recall: After exposure to information, the study participant produces a list of as much of the information as they can remember

=== Self-reported knowledge, perceived knowledge, or perceived familiarity ===
The key assumption is that emphasizes the value of knowledge of one's knowledge.

Examples of measurement:

- Scaled survey responses to questions such as, "How well informed you would say you are about this topic?", this can be also used to assess perceived knowledge before and after events

=== Structural knowledge ===
The nature of connections among different pieces of information in memory. The key assumption is that the use of elaboration increases the likelihood of remembering information.

Examples of measurement:

- Asking study participants to assess relationships among concepts. For example, participants free recall concepts onto the first row and column of a matrix, then indicate whether the concepts are related to each other by placing an "X" in the cell if they are not. Participants then rank the remaining open cells by their relatedness from 1 (only very weakly) to 7 (very strongly related).
- Study participants answer questions designed to measure elaboration involved in a task, such as, "I tried to relate the ideas I read about to my own past experiences."

=== Trust and credibility ===
People may trust science or scientists to different degrees, or may find specific scientists or specific research to be more or less credible. These factors can be related to how science can be used to advance knowledge, and may also be related to how science is communicated, with trust formation playing a central role.

Examples of measurement:

- The 21-item Trust in Science and Scientists Inventory, which measures agreement/disagreement with statements like, "We can trust scientists to share their discoveries even if we don't like their findings."
- Scientist-specific measures of agreement, such as "I would trust scientific information if I knew it came from this author."

=== Mixed use of measures ===
- While some studies purport that factual and perceived knowledge can be viewed as the same construct, a 2012 study investigating public knowledge of nanotechnology supports separating their use in communications research, as they "do not reflect the same underlying knowledge structures". Correlations between them were found to be low and they were not predicted by the same factors. For example different types of science media use, television versus online, predicted different constructs.
- Factual knowledge has been shown to be empirically distinct from structural knowledge.

== Project example ==
Government and private-led campaigns and events, such as Dana Foundation's "Brain Awareness Week", are becoming a strong focus of programmes which try to promote public awareness of science.

The UK PAWS Foundation dramatically went as far as establishing a Drama Fund with the BBC in 1994. The purpose was to encourage and support the creation of new drama for television, drawing on the world of science and technology.

The Vega Science Trust was set up in 1994 to promote science through the media of television and the internet with the aim of giving scientists a platform from which to communicate to the general public.

The Simonyi Professorship for the Public Understanding of Science chair at The University of Oxford was established in 1995 for the ethologist Richard Dawkins by an endowment from Charles Simonyi. Mathematician Marcus du Sautoy has held the chair since Dawkins' retirement in 2008. Similar professorships have since been created at other British universities. Professorships in the field have been held by well-known academics including Richard Fortey and Kathy Sykes at the University of Bristol, Brian Cox at Manchester University, Tanya Byron at Edge Hill University, Jim Al-Khalili at the University of Surrey, and Alice Roberts at the University of Birmingham.

== See also ==
- British Association for the Advancement of Science
- Citizen science
- Coalition on the Public Understanding of Science
- Conversazione
- Easiness effect
- People's science movement
- Public engagement
- Science and technology studies
- Science and technology studies in India
- Science journalism
- Science studies
- Science outreach
- Scientific literacy
- Sense about Science – a UK charity that promotes the public understanding of science
- This Week in Science – popular science podcast developed around improving public awareness in science
- World Science Day for Peace and Development
