= Science in popular culture =

Occurrence of scientific topics in popular media

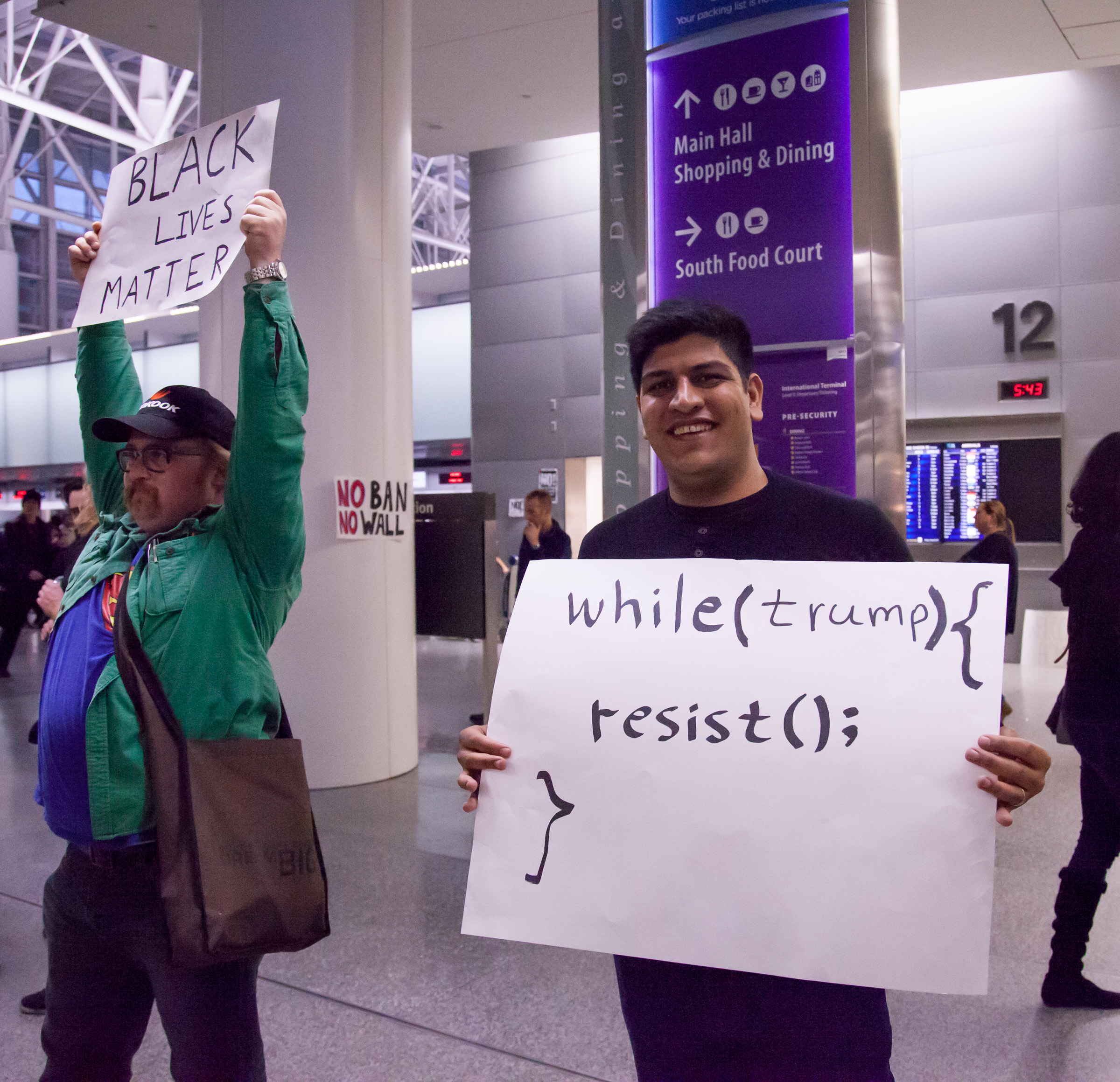
Computer programmer using a programming language to protest the US President, 2017

Science in popular culture is the treatment and use of scientific terms and issues in popular media such as cinema, music, television, and novels. Science fiction (SciFi), in particular, is a branch of literature that uses scientific ideas as a basis.In the creation of these works, scientific knowledge and theories are occasionally manipulated or distorted to align with the narrative content.

== History ==
Before the 19th century, the impact of scientific advancements on society was not consistently widespread. The general populace often remained unaware of new scientific discoveries, and even if they did become aware, comprehension of the underlying principles and the implications of these discoveries was limited. As industrialization and urbanization rose, people migrated from rural areas to work in large factories, leading to increased socialization which in turn exposed them to scientific ideas, challenging their traditional beliefs. One of these ideas is the theory of evolution, which provided a scientific theory for the origin of humankind that ran counter to many religious beliefs.

Beginning in the 19th century, there was a societal change where people were increasingly exposed to scientific and technological knowledge in their everyday lives. This was due to not only the increasing appeal for new science and technology, but the entrepreneurs, who capitalized on this appeal and would advertise those ideas to the general public. One example of such idea is the lobotomy, a medical procedure that was extensively used in the 1940s to treat mental illnesses, though it remains controversial for its effect on brain functioning and its supposed use to control minorities. A greater number of scientific discoveries made scientific research the foremost actor that people turned to in society, to help solve problems.

By the mid-19th century, knowledge became more specialized and institutionalized, such that only those that had spent years studying an academic discipline could fully grasp its knowledge and contribute to it. As more research was produced on a subject, the deeper researchers had to delve into it to produce something that hadn't been done before, which resulted in different sub-fields being created. For example, in some biological research is concerned with classification, where biologists create a taxonomies to classify biological organisms, and show the perceived relationships between different species. Other biological research focuses more on the building blocks of organisms, concerning itself with DNA sequences and proteins that are involved in the complex functions of life. As scientific research progressed, the specialization within fields meant that two biologists that studied these fields would have little to discuss regarding their respective discoveries to one another. Specialization of science also discouraged non-academic citizens from contributing to it. Due to the increasing gap between scientific discovery and its perceived usefulness by the general public, people began viewing some scientific discoveries as irrelevant. For instance, the general public wouldn't have experienced as much unrest about a recently discovered protein as they had at On the Origin of Species.

This gap led to the development of popular science (also pop-science), which intends to inform the general public about scientific fields, while combatting the perceived irrelevancy of specific sciences. Usually in the form of written media, popular science has allowed scientific ideas to be presented to the public in a way intuitively understandable. From popular science stemmed science fiction, a genre of speculative fiction that incorporated elements of science to add to its appeal.

== Examples ==
=== Alternative worlds ===
Fictional worlds refer to conceptual realms with imaginary characters and settings. These realms may parallel aspects of the real world, albeit with distinctive fantastical elements, such as in The Wizard of Oz. They may also present altered versions of historical periods, as seen in J.R.R. Tolkien's The Lord of the Rings trilogy. Additionally, fictional worlds can diverge from reality by introducing an alternate history. For example, in Harry Harrison's Eden trilogy, a fictionalized account unfolds in a reality where the dinosaur mass extinction event never occurs.

=== Androids ===
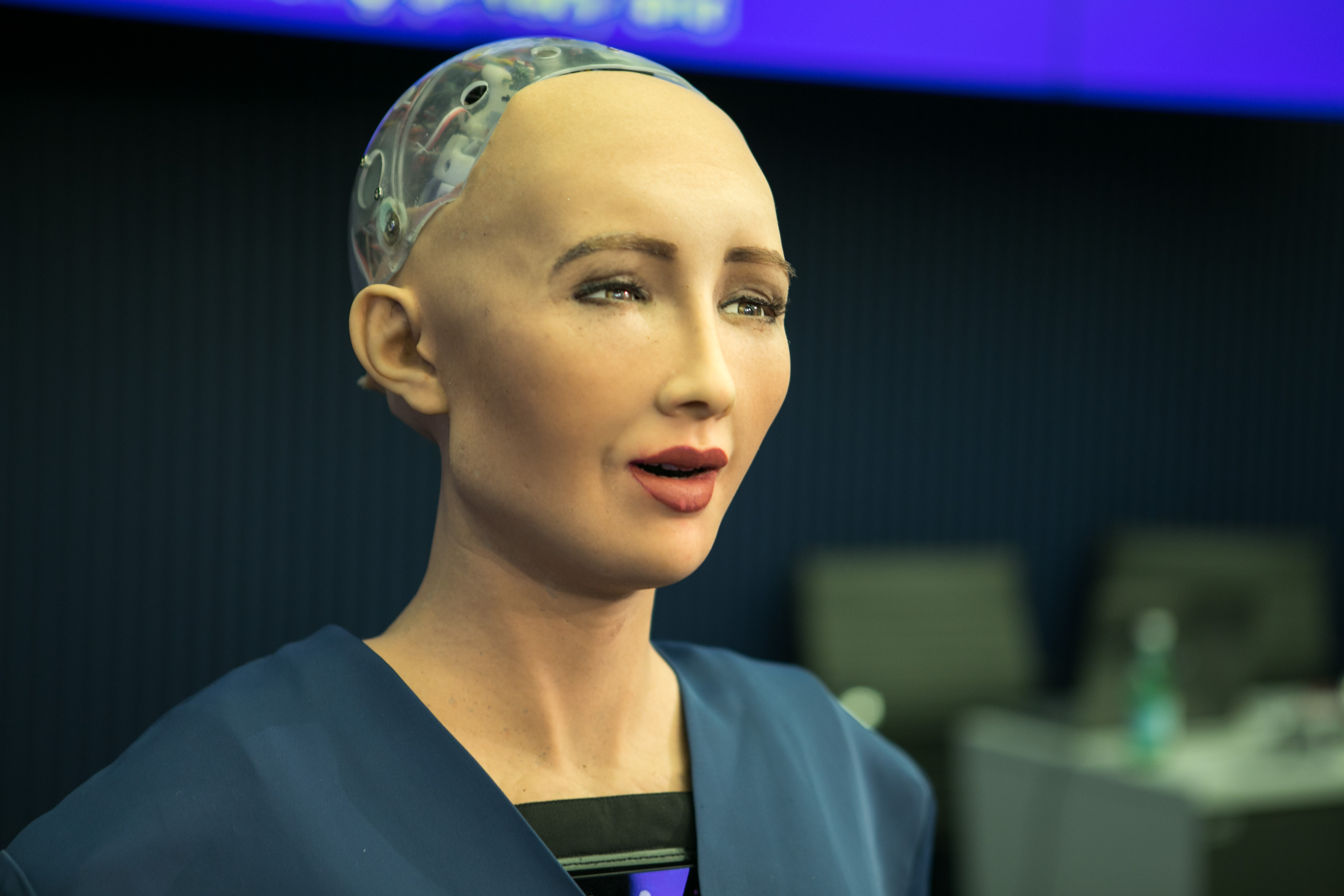
Sophia, by Hanson Robotics

The focus of androids is the invention and use of robots that look and act like humans. As of June 2018, there has been development of some prototype androids like Hanson Robotics' Sophia, who can interact with humans and engage in sophisticated but limited movement.

== See also ==
- Social effects of evolutionary theory
- Reactions to On the Origin of Species
- Popsicule - The Science in Popular Culture and Entertainment Hub
