= Genevieve Bell =

Australian cultural anthropologist

Genevieve Bell AO FTSE FAHA FASSA
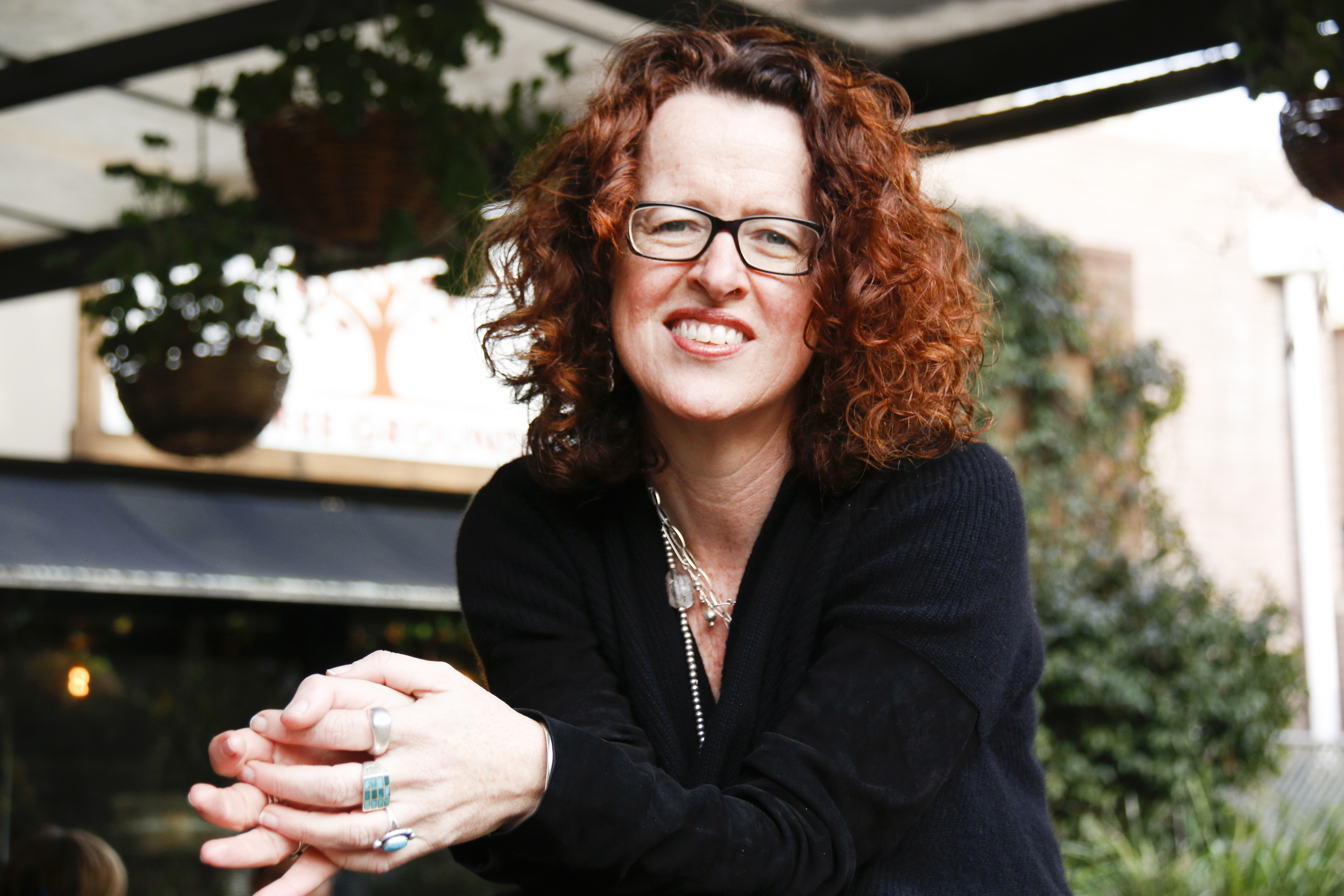
- Genevieve Bell in 2017

13th Vice Chancellor of the Australian National University
- In office 1 January 2024 – 11 September 2025
- Chancellor: Julie Bishop
- Preceded by: Brian Schmidt
- Succeeded by: Rebekah Brown (acting)

Personal details
- Born: 1967 Sydney, New South Wales, Australia
- Education: Bryn Mawr College (BA, MPhil); Stanford University (PhD)

Academic background
- Thesis: Telling Stories Out of School: Remembering the Carlisle Indian Industrial School, 1879–1918 (1998)
- Doctoral advisors: Arthur Wolf; Hill Gates

Academic work
- Discipline: Cybernetics Anthropology
- Institutions: Stanford University; Australian National University

Genevieve Bell is an Australian cyberneticist and cultural anthropologist who served as the vice-chancellor of the Australian National University from 1 January 2024 until her resignation on 11 September 2025. She is best known for her work at the intersection of cultural practice research and technological development (including as a pioneer in the field of futurist research). Bell was the inaugural director of the Autonomy, Agency and Assurance Innovation Institute (3Ai), which was co-founded by the Australian National University (ANU) and CSIRO’s Data61, and a Distinguished Professor of the ANU College of Engineering, Computing and Cybernetics. From 2021 to December 2023, she was the inaugural Director of the new ANU School of Cybernetics. She also holds the university's Florence Violet McKenzie Chair, and is the first SRI International Engelbart Distinguished Fellow.

== Early life and education ==
Daughter of renowned Australian anthropologist Diane Bell, Genevieve Bell was born in Sydney and lived in Melbourne, Canberra, and in several Aboriginal Communities in the Northern Territory when she was a child. In 1990, Bell graduated from Bryn Mawr College with a Bachelor of Arts and a Master of Philosophy in anthropology. She then attended Stanford University where she earned her master's degree and PhD in 1998, both in anthropology. Her doctoral research focused on the Carlisle Indian Industrial School.

== Career ==
=== Academic and corporate roles ===
From 1996 to 1998, Bell taught anthropology and Native American Studies at Stanford University.

In 1998, Bell was employed by the Intel Corporation to help build out their nascent social-science research competency in the advanced research and development labs. She was based at the company's Hillsboro, Oregon campus where she worked as a cultural anthropologist, studying how different cultures around the globe used technology. She and her colleagues helped reorient Intel to a more market-inspired and experience-driven approach, and she is widely credited with establishing "user experience" as a recognised competency at Intel.

Bell started Intel's first User Experience Group in 2005, as part of Intel's Digital Home Group. The company named her an Intel Fellow, their highest technical rank, in November 2008, for her work in the Digital Home Group. She rejoined the advanced research and development labs in 2010, when Intel made her the director of their new User Experience Research group. This group was Intel's first fully integrated user experience research and development group; they worked on questions of big data, smart transportation, next generation image technology and ideas about fear and wonder. Bell was made an Intel vice president in 2014 and senior fellow in 2016.

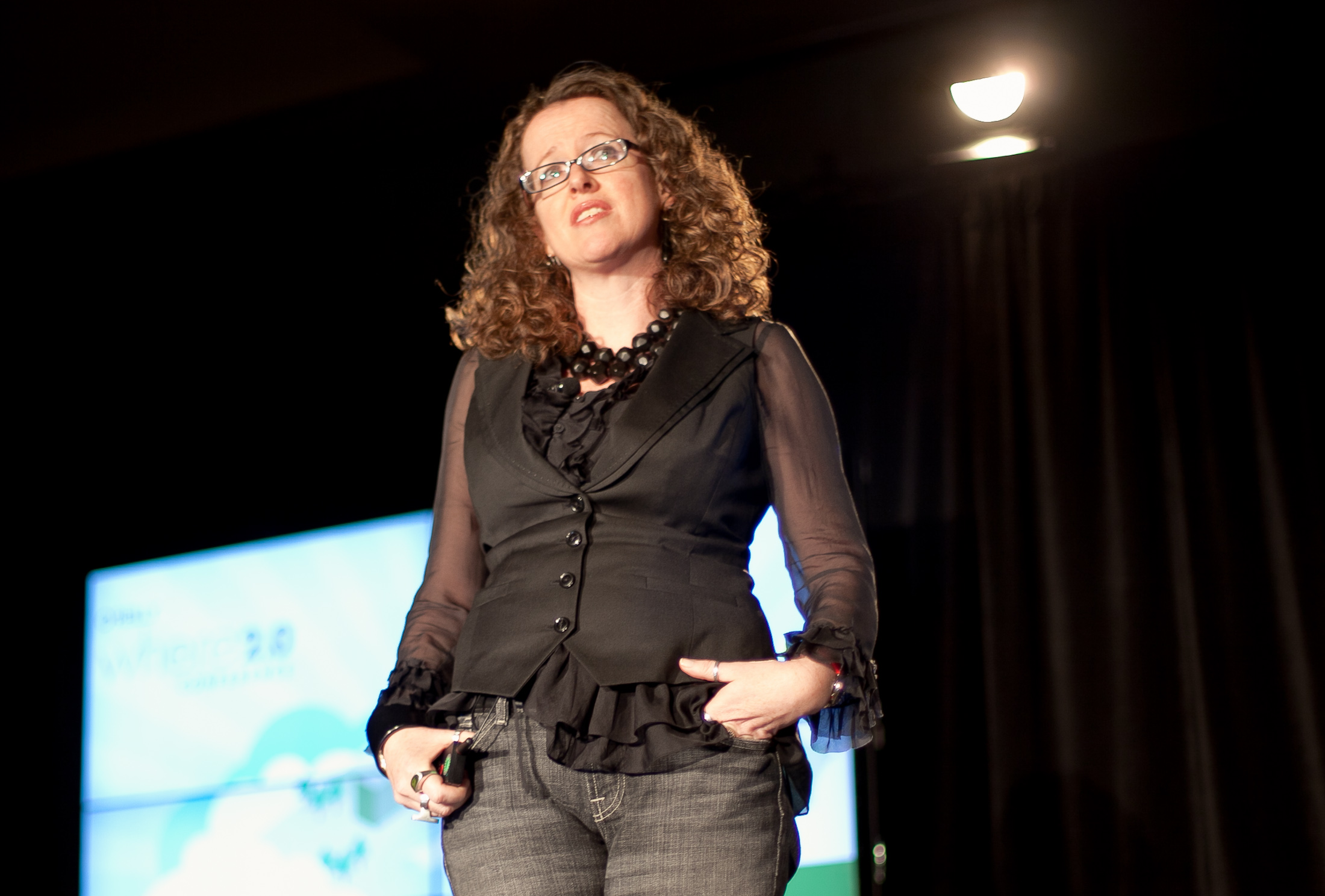
Bell in 2011

Bell has been recognised outside Intel. In 2010, she was named one of the Top 25 Women in Technology to Watch by AlwaysOn and as one of the 100 Most Creative People in Business by Fast Company. In 2012, Bell was inducted to the Women in Technology International Hall of Fame and in 2013, she was named Anita Borg’s Women of Vision in Leadership. In 2014, she was included in Elle Magazine's first list of influential women in technology and also included in a new exhibit at London's Design Museum profiling 25 women from around the world.

Bell was also a Thinker in Residence for South Australia from 2008 to 2010. Her visiting appointment was intended to help guide government policy surrounding a new national broadband initiative. Bell conducted ethnographic research and developed new innovative research methods to identify barriers to adoption and drivers around broadband uptake and her final report is available online.

After 18 years as Intel's resident anthropologist, Bell returned to Australia in 2017 as the first of five appointments under the ANU Vice-Chancellor Brian Schmidt's Entrepreneurial Fellows scheme. She is a distinguished professor at the ANU College of Engineering, Computing and Cybernetics. She is the university's inaugural appointee of the Florence Violet McKenzie Chair, named in honour of Australia's first female electrical engineer and lifelong proponent of technical education for women.

In 2017, the ANU announced a major 10-year plan to drive the expansion of its program in engineering and computer science. The expansion in part was to be led by Bell as the director of the newly founded Autonomy, Agency and Assurance Institute, to be known as the 3A Institute or 3Ai, co-founded by Australian National University and CSIRO’s Data61, Australia's largest data innovation network. The 3A Institute brings together a diverse team from a range of disciplines to tackle complex problems around artificial intelligence, data and technology and managing their impact on humanity.

Since returning to Australia, Bell's expertise in the field of AI development and regulation has been recognised by government and industry. At the 2016 Advance Awards, Bell received the Award for Technology Innovation and Overall 2016 Advance Global Australian Award. In October 2018, Bell was elected as a fellow of the Australian Academy of Technology and Engineering (ATSE). She was also appointed to the National Science and Technology Advisory Council During her time on the council, Bell was involved in authoring a 2020 report titled "What motivates people to download and continue to use the COVIDSafe app?". Additionally, Bell was the lead author of the 2023 Rapid Response Information Report (RRIP) on Generative AI for the Minister for Industry and Science.

In January 2019, Bell was appointed as an independent non-executive director of the Commonwealth Bank of Australia board.

On 22 January 2020, Bell was named the first Engelbart Distinguished Fellow by SRI International. The fellowship is named after Douglas C. Engelbart, a pioneer of modern computing, and recognises 'visionaries who are disrupting the traditional way we interact with and view technology' from around the globe. Shortly after, Bell was appointed an Officer of the Order of Australia in the 2020 Australia Day Honours for distinguished service to education, particularly to the social sciences and cultural anthropology. That same year she was also elected as an Honorary Fellow of the Australian Academy of the Humanities.

In 2021, Bell created the new School of Cybernetics at the ANU and was appointed the inaugural director. Informed by cybernetics and building on the foundational work of the 3A Institute, the School of Cybernetics aims to inspire and shape safe, sustainable, and responsible futures that consider people, the environment, and technology.

=== Vice-Chancellor ===
On 26 September 2023, Bell resigned from the Commonwealth Bank board. The same day, Bell was announced as the 13th vice-chancellor and president of the Australian National University. She held the position from 1 January 2024 until her resignation submitted the night of 10 September 2025.

In August 2024, Bell advised the ANU Council of budget issues and proposed cutting $250m from the cost base of the ANU. In October 2024, Bell announced a major restructure of ANU and a projected deficit of more than $200m. As part of the restructure, the closure of the ANU College of Health and Medicine was announced. Following the announcement, the Canberra Times reported criticism of Bell for her handling of the announcement, including her decision to use a one-way video link.

The restructuring announcement was followed by a request from Bell to all ANU staff that that they forgo a 2.5% pay increase scheduled to take effect in December 2024. The request was criticised by the National Tertiary Education Union, who had not been consulted before the request was issued to staff, on the basis that a similar proposal in 2020 had not averted job losses. The request for a pay increase deferral was put to a vote by ANU staff and defeated, with 88% voting against it.

The ANU Chancellor, Julie Bishop, lent support for Bell's restructuring proposal and rejected criticism that the ANU's financial problems had developed over the course of her tenure as Chancellor. Bishop reportedly commented that the pay rise deferral was fair because 'members of staff have been part of the inefficiencies that the university is now seeking to address'.

In December 2024, the Australian Financial Review (AFR) reported on claims that Bell presided over a 'culture of fear'. Bell resigned as Vice Chancellor on 10 September 2025, an announcement released publicly on 11 September 2025.

=== Subsequent career ===
After resigning, it was announced that Bell would take a 12 month period of study leave, and then return to the ANU as a distinguished professor in the School of Cybernetics.

In April 2026, The Saturday Paper reported that Bell had been suspended from her distinguished professor role and banned from the ANU's campus in January 2026. The Saturday Paper story noted that this incident was in relation to allegations that Bell had promoted an academic in the School of Cybernetics through an irregular process while she was vice-chancellor. The Canberra Times stated that Bell's suspension was overturned in February and The Sydney Morning Herald noted that she had returned to the campus, though the investigation into the allegations was continuing.

== Notable talks and works ==
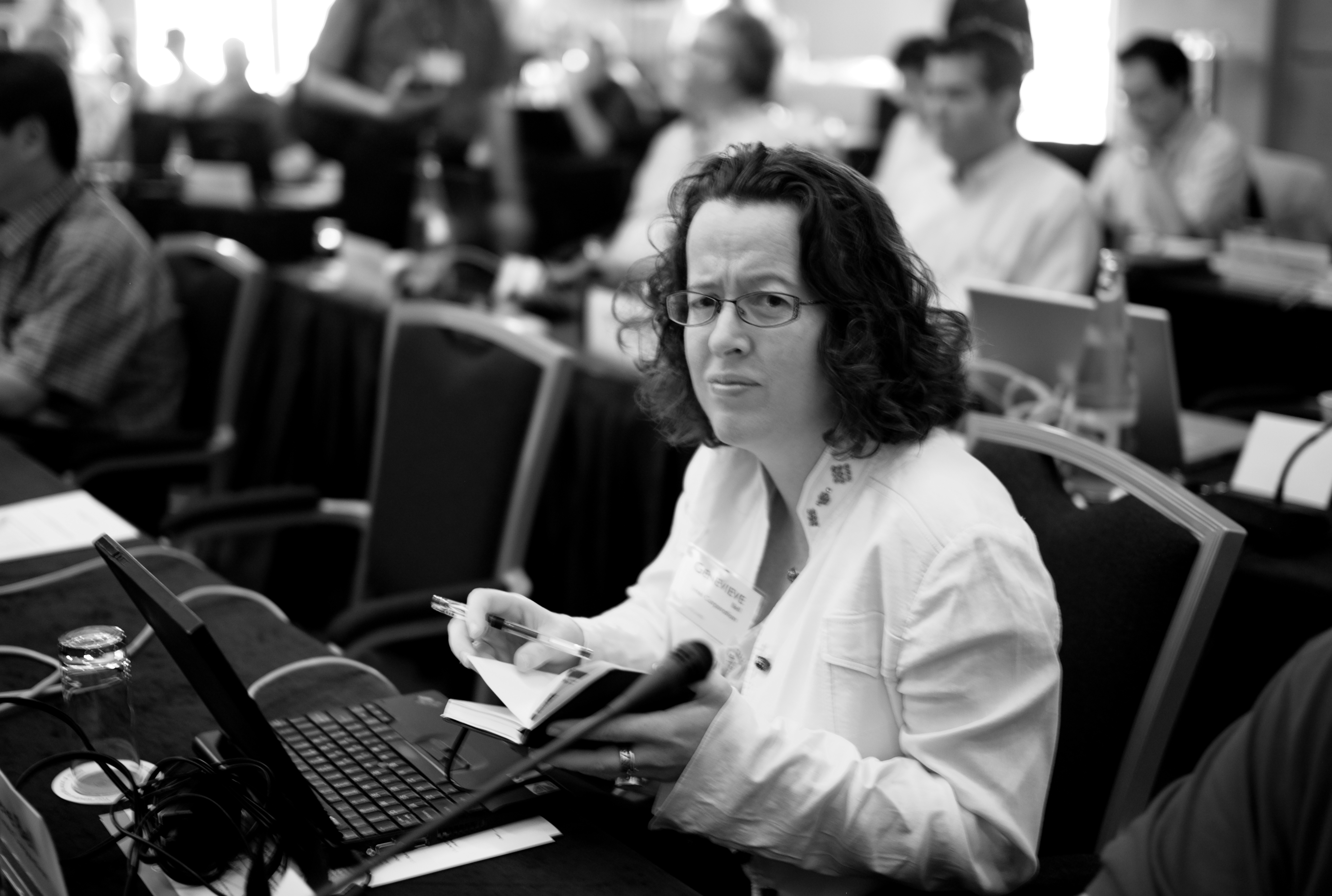
Bell in 2007

Bell is a notable public voice in the realms of emerging and historical technology, cybernetics, and artificial intelligence. She has given multiple TED and TEDx talks, including "6 Big Ethical Questions About the Future of AI" and "The Value of Boredom".

In October 2017, Bell presented the ABC's 2017 Boyer Lectures, interrogating what it means to be human, and Australian, in a digital world. Bell joins the list of prominent Australians selected each year by the ABC since 1959 to present the annual Boyer Lectures and stimulate a national conversation on social, cultural and political issues of contemporary Australian society.

In 2021, Bell delivered the IPAA's Garran Oration, the Australian public sector's most prestigious address that honours one of the most prominent Australian Commonwealth public servants, Sir Robert Garran GCMG. The talk has been held every year since 1959 and has previously been delivered by former Australian prime ministers and other notable Australian figures. Bell's 2021 Oration highlights the role of cybernetics in imagining, understanding, and building the future.

Bell also delivered the inaugural Ann Moyal Lecture in 2023 in association with the National Library of Australia, a talk given by distinguished speakers on a contemporary topic which draws on interdisciplinary knowledge relating to fields such as science, history, art, anthropology, technological change and more. Ann Moyal was a highly influential Australian historian who pioneered the history of science in Australia. Bell's lecture explores Australia's Overland Telegraph Line through a cybernetic lens, building on years of innovative research partly funded by Meta and their responsible Metaverse fund.

Other speaking highlights include her 2016 O’Reilly Conference keynote on AI and making human connection, her 2018 WIRED25 talk on ethical AI, her 2018 ASSA Fay Gale lecture on anthropological interventions for decolonizing AI, and her 2020 Long Now seminar on responsible AI in the fourth industrial revolution.

Alongside her speaking engagements, Bell has authored several articles, books, and other publications. Her first book, Divining a Digital Future: Mess and Mythology in Ubiquitous Computing, written in collaboration with Paul Dourish, is an exploration of the social and cultural aspects of ubiquitous computing, with a particular focus on the disciplinary and methodological issues that have shaped the ubiquitous computing research agenda. The book was published by MIT Press in 2011.

An earlier essay from 2007 by Bell, also co-authored with Dourish, "'Resistance is Futile': Reading Science Fiction Alongside Ubiquitous Computing", has been widely cited as an inspiration for, or a key influence on, the emergence of the field of design fiction.

Bell contributed to the 2015 book Data: Now Bigger and Better! in her chapter “The Secret Life of Big Data”, building on her previous talks surrounding critical accounts of technology.

In 2021, Bell contributed to the Griffith Review 71: Remaking the Balance through her piece “Touching the Future”, which builds on her 2017 ABC Boyer Lectures and aims to introduce an approach to the future and cybernetics to a broader audience. The same year she also published the chapter “Talking to AI: An anthropological encounter with artificial intelligence” in The SAGE Handbook of Cultural Anthropology, drawing from her earlier talks and presentations on anthropological approaches to AI. Additionally, she was lead author of the “Custodians and Midwives: The Library of the Future” School of Cybernetics report, a work which represents the culmination of a year-long collaboration with the National Library of Australia and provides a cybernetic analysis of the library and strategies for integrating AI in the library's future.

In 2022, she published “The metaverse is a new word for an old idea” in the MIT Technology Review. In the article she discusses the origins and early histories of the metaverse and how it can inform the building of present-day metaverse and other technologies.

== Awards and fellowships ==
Bell has received a number of awards and fellowships throughout her career in recognition of her work, including:

- 2024: Fellow of the Academy of the Social Sciences in Australia
- 2024: Inaugural Margaret Mead Prize in cybernetics
- 2021, 2023: The Australian Top 100 Innovator
- 2021: Fellow of the Australian Academy of the Humanities (FAHA)
- 2020: Inaugural SRI International Engelbart Distinguished Fellow
- 2020: Fellow of the Australian Academy of Technology and Engineering (FTSE)
- 2020: Officer of the Order of Australia (AO)
- 2017: Inaugural Florence Violet McKenzie Chair
- 2016: Overall Winner and Innovation Awardee of the Advance Global Australian Awards
- 2014: Elle Magazine Influential Woman in Tech
- 2013: Anita Borg Foundation Woman of Vision
- 2013: Fast Company 25 Smartest Women on Twitter
- 2012: Women in Technology Hall of Fame Inductee
- 2010: Fast Company Influential Woman in Technology
- 2009: Fast Company 100 Most Creative People in Business
