= Academic structure of the Australian National University =

The academic structure of the Australian National University is organised as seven academic colleges which contain a network of inter-related faculties, research schools and centres. Each college is responsible for undergraduate and postgraduate education as well as research in its respective field.

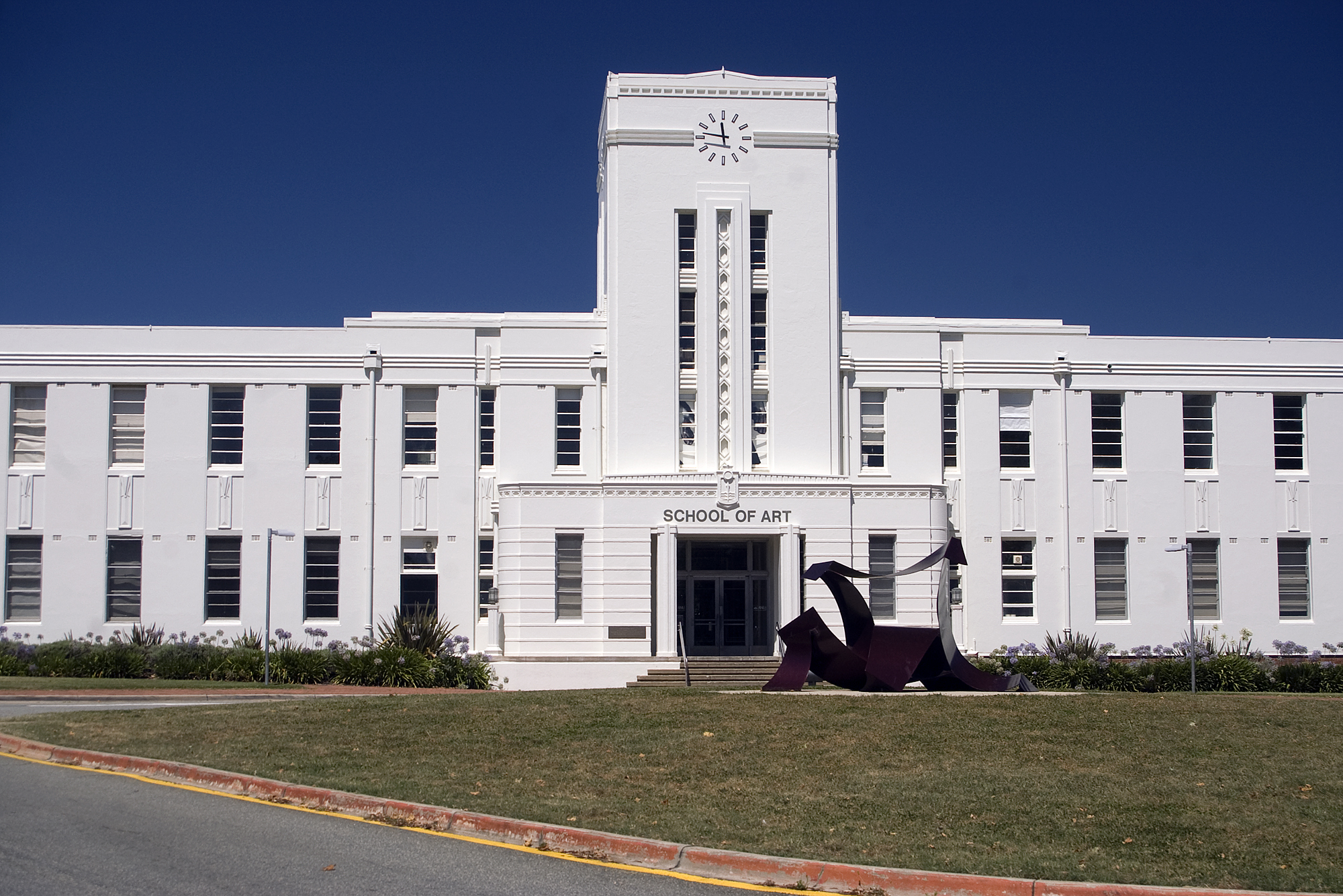
ANU School of Art

== ANU College of Arts and Social Sciences ==
The ANU College of Arts and Social Sciences is divided into the Research School of Social Sciences (RSSS) and Research School of Humanities and the Arts (RSHA).

Within the Research School of Social Sciences there are schools dedicated to history, philosophy, sociology, politics and international relations, Arab and Islamic studies and Latin and American studies.

RSHA contains schools focusing on anthropology, archaeology, classics, art history, English literature, drama, film studies, gender studies, linguistics, European languages as well as an art and music school.

=== Australian Centre for Indigenous History ===
The Australian Centre for Indigenous History (ACIH) was established within the ANU School of History, to "raise the profile of the study of Indigenous history through internationally competitive scholarship", among other aims. The centre was officially launched on 28 March 2003, with Senator Aden Ridgeway officiating. Ann McGrath was the founding director, and stayed at the helm until 2019, when Lawrence Bamblett and Maria Nugent were appointed co-directors. Gordon Briscoe was one of two inaugural research fellows at ACIH.

== ANU College of Asia and the Pacific ==
The ANU College of Asia and the Pacific is a specialist centre of Asian and Pacific studies and languages. The College is home to three academic schools: the Crawford School of Public Policy, a research intensive public policy school; the School of Culture History and Language, the nation's centre dedicated to investigating and learning with and about the people, languages, and lands of Asia and the Pacific; and Coral Bell School of Asia Pacific Affairs, Australia's foremost collection of expertise in the politics and international affairs of Asia and the Pacific.

The college also houses the Australian Centre on China in the World (CIW), the Regulatory Institutions Network (RegNet) and the CSCAP Australia.

The College is affiliated with Columbia University's Weatherhead East Asian Institute and Indiana University's Pan Asia Institute.

== ANU College of Business and Economics ==
The ANU College of Business and Economics comprises four Research Schools, of Accounting; Economics; Finance, Actuarial Studies & Statistics; and Management.

== ANU College of Engineering, Computing & Cybernetics ==
The ANU College of Engineering, Computing & Cybernetics is divided into three Schools; School of Engineering, School of Computing and School of Cybernetics. ANU is home to the National Computational Infrastructure and was a co-founder of NICTA, which was the main information and communications technology research centre in Australia until 2016. At that stage NICTA was merged with CSIRO to form Data 61, a Research Business Unit.

== ANU College of Law, Governance & Policy ==
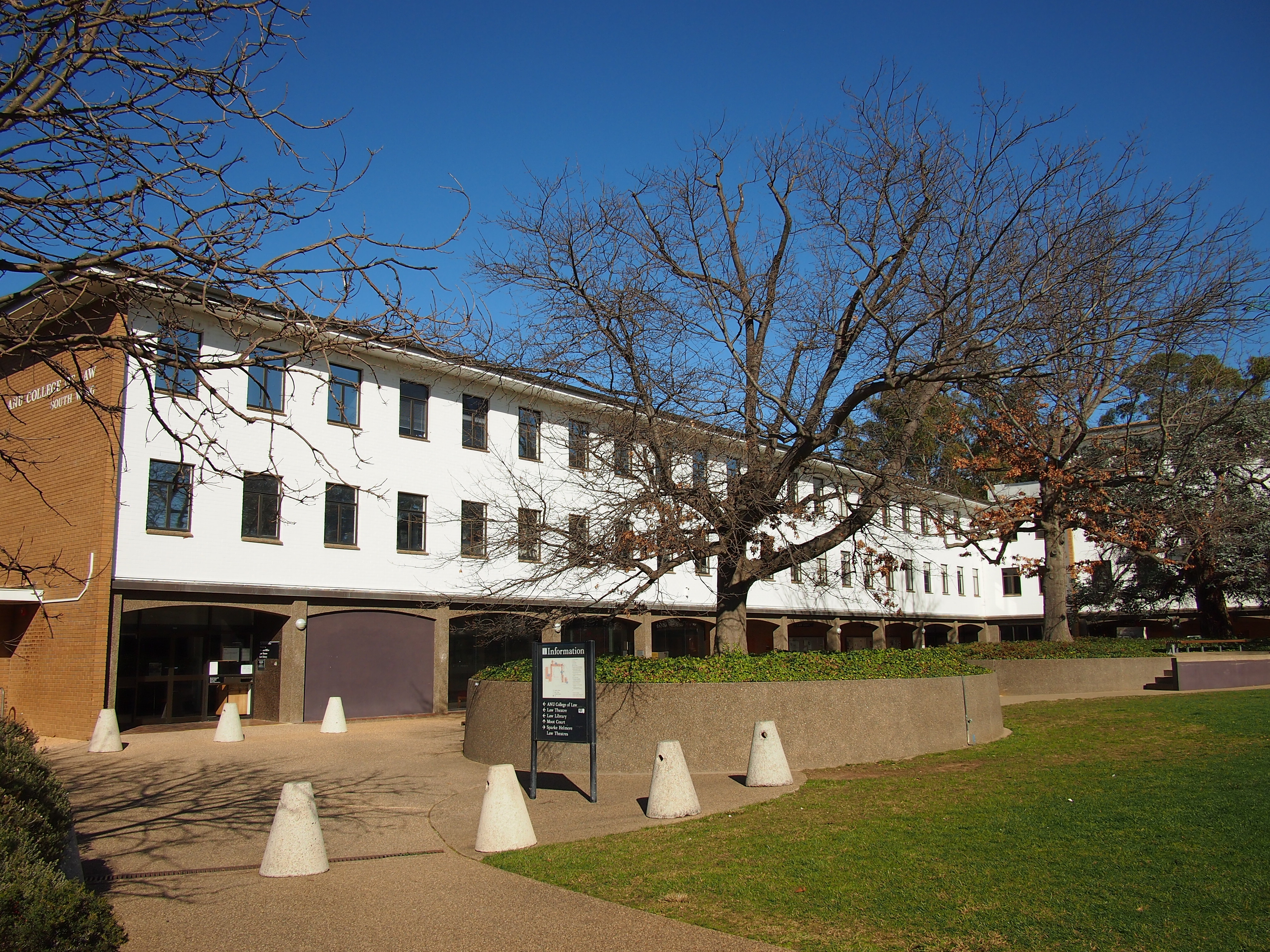
ANU College of Law

The ANU College of Law, Governance and Policy, established in 2025. The College incorporates the ANU Law School, the Crawford School of Public Policy, the School of Regulation and Global Governance (RegNet), and the National Centre for Epidemiology and Population Health (NCEPH).

== ANU College of Health & Medicine ==
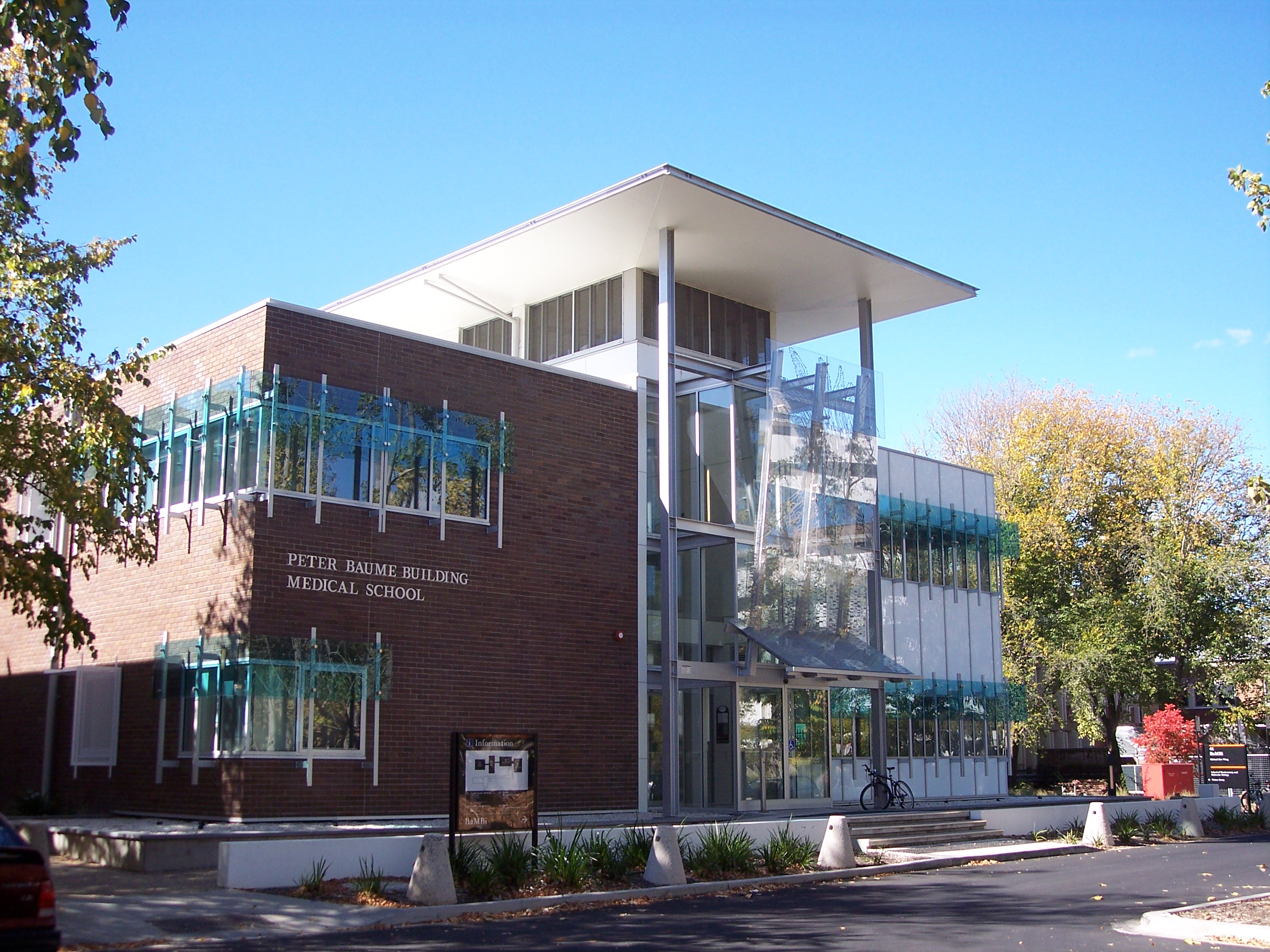
ANU School of Medicine

The ANU College of Health & Medicine encompasses the John Curtin School of Medical Research (JCSMR), the ANU Medical School, Research School of Psychology, and National Centre for Epidemiology and Population Health.

== ANU College of Science ==
The ANU College of Physical & Mathematical Sciences comprises the Research Schools of Astronomy & Astrophysics, Biology, Chemistry, Earth Sciences, and Physics; Fenner School of Environment and Society; Mathematical Sciences Institute; and Australian National Centre for the Public Awareness of Science.

=== Research School of Physics ===
The ANU Research School of Physics focuses primarily on research into materials science and engineering; lasers, nonlinear optics and photonics; nanotechnology and mesoscopic physics; physics of atoms, molecules and the nucleus; plasma physics and surface science; physics and the environment. Under the direction of Mark Oliphant, nuclear physics was one of the university's most notable early research priorities, leading to the construction of a 500 megajoule homopolar generator and a 7.7 megaelectronvolts cyclotron in the 1950s.

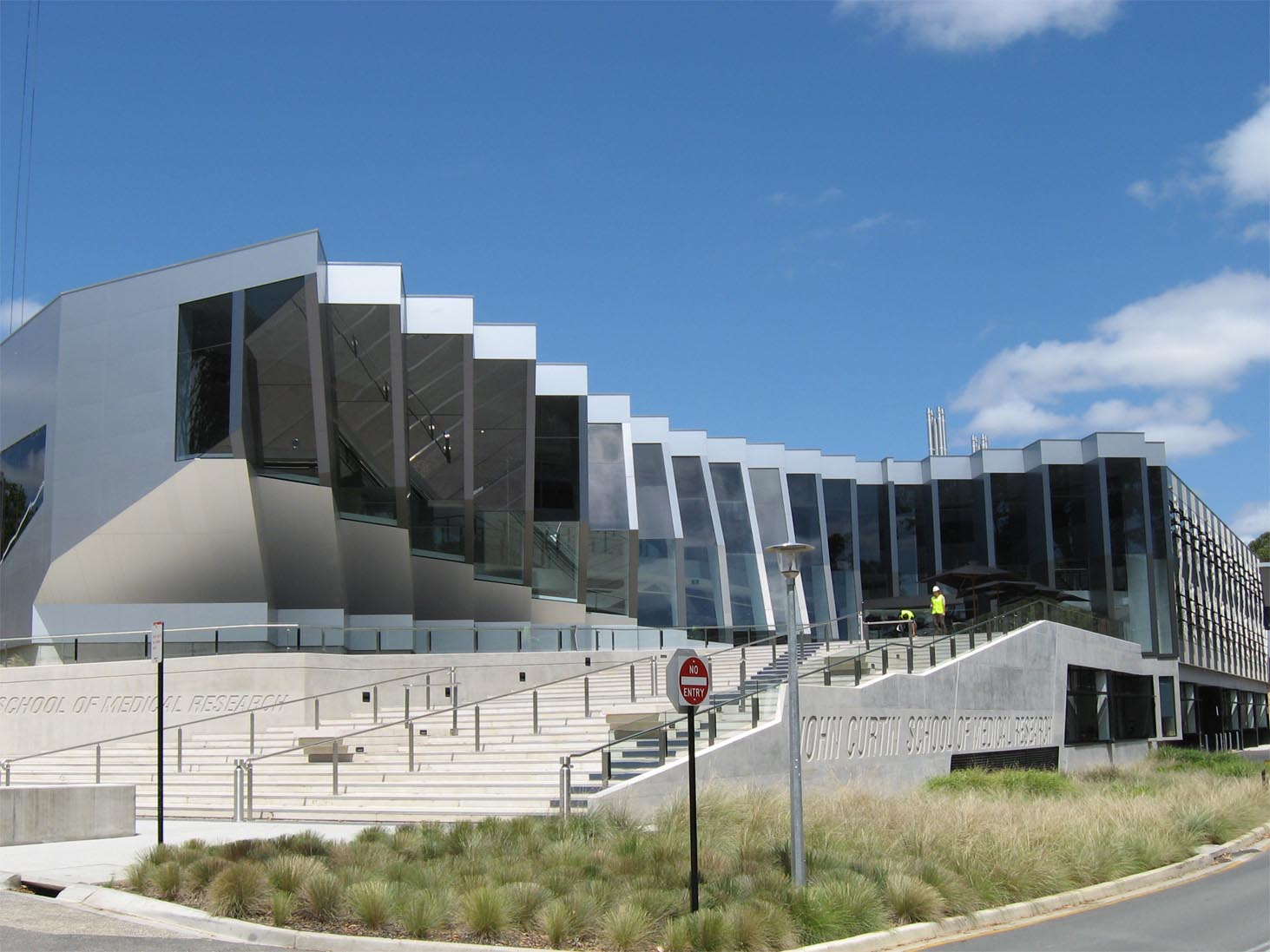
John Curtin School of Medical Research

== Marie Reay Teaching Centre ==
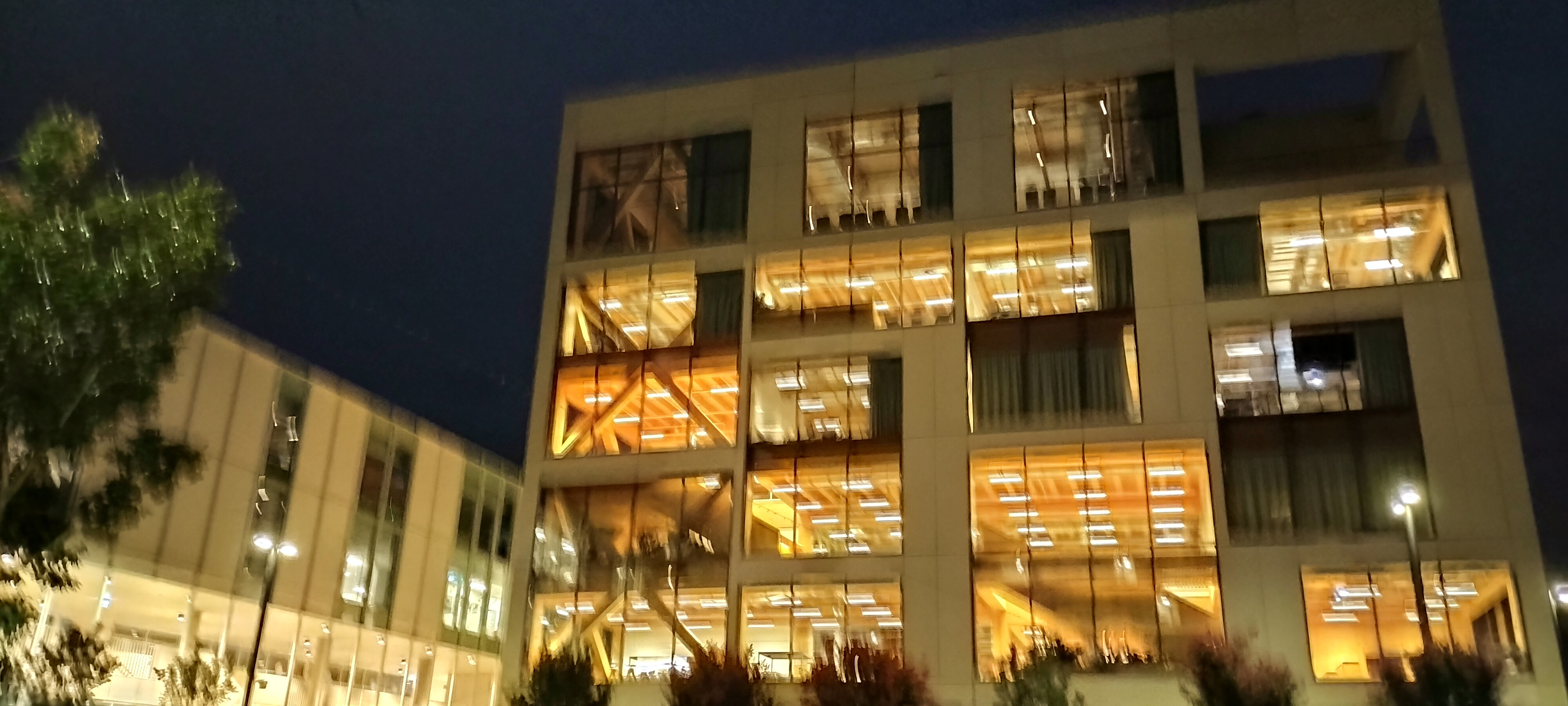
The Marie Reay Teaching Centre at night.

The Marie Reay Teaching Centre is located in the Kambri area.

== University centres ==
There are individual research centres connected to the University.

- Asia Pacific College of Diplomacy
- Crawford School of Economics and Government
- Australian Primary Health Care Research Institute
- Centre for Aboriginal Economic Policy Research
- Centre for Applied Philosophy and Public Ethics
- Centre for Cross-Cultural Research, 1997–2008?, an ARC Centre of Excellence
- Centre for Mental Health Research
- Centre for the Public Awareness of Science
- Centre for Sustainable Energy Systems
- Eccles Institute of Neuroscience
- Humanities Research Centre
- National Centre for Epidemiology and Population Health
- The National Centre for Information Systems Research
- National Graduate School of Management
- Mathematical Sciences Institute
- The National Europe Centre

== Australian National Institute for Public Policy ==
In May 2010, Prime Minister Kevin Rudd announced a $111.7 million commitment to the development by ANU of a new Australian National Institute for Public Policy.
