= Autonomy, Agency and Assurance Innovation Institute =

Australian research institute

The Autonomy, Agency and Assurance Innovation Institute (3Ai) is an Australian research institute which hopes to create a new applied science around the management of artificial intelligence, data and technology inclusive of their impact on humanity.

== Background ==
The institute was founded on 4 September 2017 by the Australian National University (ANU) and CSIRO's Data 61 Research Business Unit. Initial plans covered a 5-year period with the goal of establishing a new intellectual framework by 2022. It is envisaged that this would combine theory and praxis within a curriculum which would enable the training of the first generation of certified practitioners with a professional qualification in the emergent applied science. Genevieve Bell was appointed as the first director. It is located in the School of Cybernetics, at the ANU College of Engineering and Computer Science, Canberra, Australia.

The foundation of 3Ai has been cited as one example of how Australian universities endeavour to engage with industry to develop a new field of applied science. The development of a Master's programme to establish a new branch of engineering has attracted support from Microsoft, KPMG and the Macquarie Group.
