= National Security College =

National Security College may refer to:

- National Security College (Israel)
- National Security College (Turkey)
- National Security College (Australia), part of the Australian National University
- National Security College (Pakistan)
