= Rebekah Brown =

Australian academic

Rebekah Brown FASSA

Vice Chancellor and President of the Australian National University
- Acting
- Assumed office 11 September 2025
- Chancellor: Julie Bishop; Andrew Metcalfe (acting); Gordon de Brouwer
- Preceded by: Genevieve Bell

Provost and Senior Vice President of the Australian National University
- In office 17 June 2024 – 11 September 2025
- Chancellor: Julie Bishop
- Preceded by: Position established
- Succeeded by: Joan Leach (acting)

Personal details
- Education: Monash University (BEng); University of New South Wales (PhD)

Academic background
- Thesis: Institutionalisation of Integrated Urban Stormwater Management: Multiple-Case Analysis of Local Management Reform Across Metropolitan Sydney (2003)

Academic work
- Discipline: Environmental studies
- Institutions: University of New South Wales; Monash University; Australian National University
- Main interests: Urban water management, sustainable development, water-sensitive cities, transdisciplinary research

Rebekah Ruth Brown is an Australian academic who is a fellow of the Academy of the Social Sciences in Australia and has served as interim vice-chancellor and president of the Australian National University since September 2025. Her research specializes in urban water management, sustainable development, and transdisciplinary methods.

== Education ==
Brown holds a Bachelor of Civil Engineering degree with honors from Monash University. She completed a PhD in Environmental Studies at the University of New South Wales in 2003, with a doctoral thesis titled "Institutionalization of integrated urban stormwater management: multiple-case analysis of local management reform across metropolitan Sydney."

Brown worked as a civil engineer on infrastructure projects across the United Kingdom, Europe, Southeast Asia, and Africa.

== Academic career ==
Brown has worked in interdisciplinary research at the intersection of the social and biophysical sciences in sustainable water management since the early 2000s.

Brown co-founded the water-sensitive cities research platform at Monash University. She was involved in establishing the $120 million (AUD) Cooperative Research Centre for Water Sensitive Cities, comprising 86 partner organizations and over 170 researchers. In this role, she served as Chief Research Officer and inaugural Society-themed Program Leader, overseeing research outcomes from more than 100 researchers and 40 doctoral students across multiple institutions and 20 disciplines.

Brown's research has been cited in UN-Habitat's formulation of policy on urban drainage (2014–2017), in a UNESCO analysis of 33 cities (2012), and by the Asian Development Bank in framing water infrastructure investment strategies.

In June 2024, Brown was appointed Provost and Senior Vice-President of the Australian National University, serving as the senior deputy to the Vice-Chancellor. Following the resignation of Genevieve Bell in September 2025, Brown was appointed interim Vice-Chancellor and President of ANU. She has committed to serving in this role until at least the end of 2026.

Brown announced the end of the "Renew ANU" restructuring program and committed to no forced redundancies. She outlined three key objectives: creating stability, rebuilding trust, and developing a new strategic direction for the university. Brown served simultaneously as both provost and interim vice-chancellor during this period, with no separate interim provost appointed.

=== Research and publications ===
Brown has published over 220 papers in journals, including Nature, Science, Global Environmental Change, and Water Research. Her work has an h-index of 50 and more than 12,800 citations.

== Personal life ==
Brown was the first person in her family to attend university. She studied engineering as one of only three women in her undergraduate cohort.
