= Medical education in Australia =

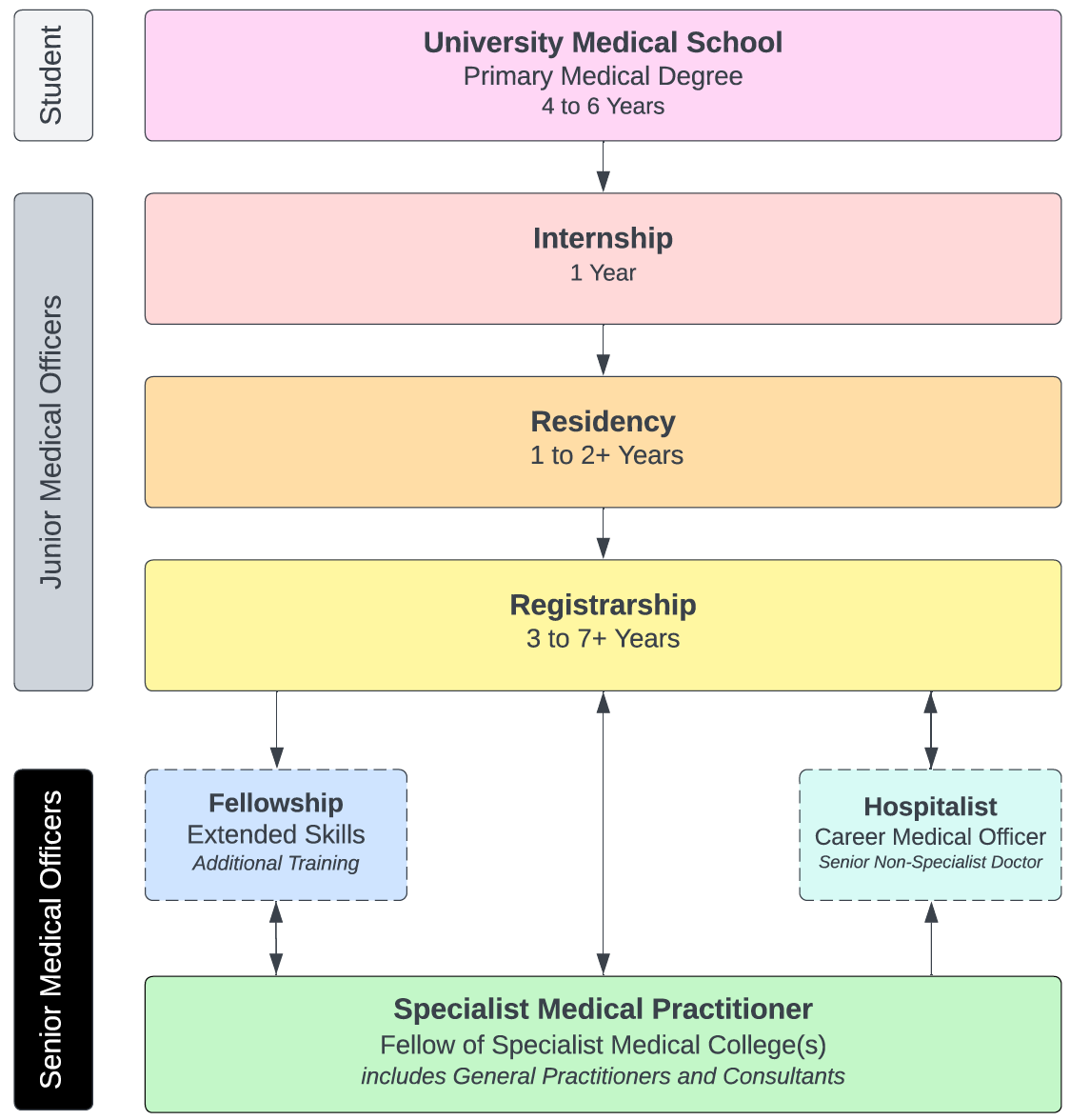
Flowchart of medical career progression and pathways

Medical education in Australia includes the educational activities involved in the initial and ongoing training of Medical Practitioners. In Australia, medical education begins in medical school; upon graduation it is followed by a period of pre-vocational training including Internship and Residency; thereafter, enrolment into a specialist-vocational training program as a Registrar eventually leads to fellowship qualification and recognition as a fully qualified Specialist Medical Practitioner (that is a fully qualified General Practitioner or Consultant). Medical education in Australia is facilitated by medical schools and the medical specialty colleges, and is regulated by the Australian Medical Council and Australian Health Practitioner Regulation Agency (AHPRA) of which includes the Medical Board of Australia where medical practitioners are registered nationally.

The Australian medical education system is historically similar to that of the United Kingdom, but in recent decades, has received influences from the United States and Canada. In contrast to their North American counterparts, Internship and Residency in Australia are pre-vocational terms intended for general clinical rotations so that the junior doctor can gain a broader clinical experience in various medical specialties prior to embarking on a specialist-vocational training program as a Registrar, and upon successful completion, qualification as a Fellow of a specialist medical college and therefore registration with the AHPRA as a specialist medical practitioner. In the United States, there are no pre-vocational terms, whereby specialty selection during Internship ensures streamlined clinical rotations for that intended specialty pathway, and thereafter, enrolment and progression onto a Residency program towards achieving specialist board certification; therefore, Residency in the United States is equivalent to a Registrarship in Australia. 'Board certified' attending physicians in the United States are equivalent to AHPRA-registered specialist medical practitioners.

In Australia and for the purposes of this article: Consultants refer to Specialist Medical Practitioners who practice in an AHPRA recognised specialist field of medicine that is beyond the scope of and not General Practice (or Family Medicine). General Practitioners refer to Specialist Medical Practitioners who practice in the AHPRA recognised specialist field of General Practice (or Family Medicine). In Australia, General Practitioners (GPs) are essentially alike family physicians in the United States, who typically fulfil the role of a primary care physician that is responsible for coordinating, assessing and managing general healthcare of their patients. GPs typically refer patients to (or 'consult' with) Consultants for a further expert opinion and/or specialised treatment if required.

The education and training requirements of a medical practitioner from starting medical school to completing specialist training typically takes between 9 years to 16 years (or more) assuming full-time study and work, and dependent on the specialty choice and satisfying in-training requirements. In Australia, medical practitioners typically pursue a career pathway to become a Specialist Medical Practitioner with the endpoint of working as either a General Practitioner or Consultant. There is a small subset of medical practitioners who decide not to formally complete registrarship nor attain fellowship qualification, and instead opt for a career as non-specialist medical practitioners, which are known as career hospital doctors or career medical officers; non-specialist medical practitioners can typically work with a reasonable level of autonomy and independence dependent on their experience and skill, but nonetheless under the auspices of a specialist medical practitioner.

Most of the specialist fellowship qualifications and medical school degrees awarded to Australian-trained clinicians are internationally recognised. Reciprocally, Australia accepts most recognised university and specialty qualifications of international medical graduates from countries with well-established medical education programs and health systems; that is, pending verification of the person's identity (including visa and immigration requirements), qualifications, practice history and experience, English language competency, a probationary period of supervised practice, and any necessary examinations and assessments to abridge any gaps in knowledge to ensure clinicians are aligned to the current standard of medical practice in Australia as dictated by the relevant Medical Specialty College, Australian Medical Council and Medical Board of Australia.

== Medical School ==
Entry into medical school and successful completion of the program allows graduates to qualify as medical practitioners (doctors) and begin postgraduate pre-vocational training. Medical schools provide education in basic medical knowledge and clinical skills to prepare graduates for supervised clinical practice during their internship. Admission to medical school is highly competitive in many countries.

=== Nomenclature ===
Historically, Australian medical schools have followed the United Kingdom by conferring the degrees of Bachelor of Medicine and Bachelor of Surgery (MBBS) to its medical graduates, whilst reserving the degree of Doctor of Medicine (MD) to be issued to those who have completed higher research studies or given honorarily to those who have contributed significantly to the medical professional community (analogous to the PhD or honorary doctorates). While a significant proportion of Australian medical schools as of the early 1990s have shifted from undergraduate to graduate entry programs (that is, enrolling students who have already completed a bachelor's degree in another field of study), medical schools continued to nevertheless award the MBBS as its standard medical degree regardless if it was an undergraduate or graduate entry program. Some medical schools have moved to awarding MD (or a combination of a BSc and MD) instead of the MBBS to its medical graduates. However, given that the MBBS is categorised in the Australian Qualifications Framework as a Level 7 Bachelor's level degree it had the benefit of not mandating its students to partake in a research project, whilst the MD is categorised a Level 9 Master's level degree it does require its students to formally produce a research project as part of their studies; that said, students in the MBBS program commonly did nevertheless still pursue research on an extra-curricular basis.

Regardless, both MBBS and MD awarded at any Australian medical school qualifies a person to be registered with the Medical Board as a medical practitioner and allow the graduate to be customarily addressed by their prefix title of 'Doctor' ('Dr.'). It is also worthwhile to note that while the colloquialism of the term 'physician' in the United States is used to broadly refer to any type of medical practitioner, in Australia and the United Kingdom 'physician' typically refers to a medical practitioner who specialises in the field of internal medicine / general medicine or its sub-specialities; similarly, the 'surgeon' typically refers to a medical practitioner who specialists in a surgical specialty. In order to avoid confusion given the wide interpretation and availability of those who utilise the prefix of 'Doctor (Dr.)' in other professions, the Medical Board and relevant federal and state legislation has chosen to refer medical doctors formally as medical practitioners in Australia.

=== Undergraduate Entry ===
Medical schools have traditionally in Australia followed the Commonwealth and United Kingdom by admitting students directly from secondary school (high school) matriculates. About half of the medical schools in Australia remain undergraduate in their admission. Applicants apply directly to the medical school and/or through the state's respective Tertiary Admission Centre (TAC). Applicants are typically assessed by a combination of their:

- Australian Tertiary Admission Rank (ATAR) score, or equivalent, which is derived from the state's secondary school exit exam performance,
- University Clinical Aptitude Test (UCAT) score which assesses the suitability of the candidate for medicine based on psychometric, logic and reasoning assessment,
- Other testing scores such as those from the Casper required by Curtin University or the psychometric test required by Bond University,
- Interview conducted by the respective university's medical school, which are typically in a multiple mini interview (MMI) or panel format, designed to further psycho-socially assess the candidate's suitability for medicine as well as assessing their merits

Undergraduate medical programs are typically 5 to 6 years in length following the traditional two-semester academic year (the exception to this is Bond University which has a three-trimester academic year which allows students to complete the course in 4.6 years). Notwithstanding that there are some universities, while accepting the student as an undergraduate, typically require they complete a first degree in science (or something else) in addition to the medical degree that is to be completed subsequently (i.e. the provisional or guaranteed entry pathways offered by traditionally graduate entry schools).

=== Graduate Entry ===
About half of medical schools in Australia have followed the United States and moved to post-graduate entry. Applicants are varied from those of "pre-med" or health sciences related background and those from unrelated professions such as law or engineering. Applicants either apply directly to the medical school or through the Graduate Entry Medical School Admissions System (GEMSAS) for GEMPASS Australia universities. Applicants are typically assessed by a combination of their:

- University Grade Point Average (GPA) score in their recent degree(s) which is a reflection of their academic performance,
- Graduate Australian Medical School Admissions Test (GAMSAT) score which assesses understanding of ideas in social and cultural contexts, written communication and scientific knowledge,
- Curriculum vitae (CV) and references which should highlight the job experience and professional positions held, and any relevant skills or achievements,
- Interview conducted by the respective university's medical school, which are typically multi-station and designed to further psycho-socially assess the candidate's suitability to the medical profession

Graduate medical programs are typically 4 years in length. They do not follow a typical university academic year due to the volume of content and experience required to be learned.

=== Syllabus ===
Most medical schools follow a similar education program, which includes essentially two phases:

1. Pre-Clinical (first 1–3 years) is typically classroom focused and theoretical in developing foundational medical knowledge of anatomy, pathophysiology, pharmacology, whilst gradually introducing the principles of patient care and basic clinical skills
2. Clinical (last 2–3 years) is typically based in the hospital or clinic where the student partakes in clinical placements in various specialties similar to an observership or clerkship where they learn from clinicians in order to further develop their clinical skills

Most learning is multi-modal and include traditional didactic learning through lectures, workshops, seminars, clinical simulation and tutorials, group-based tutorials such as Case-Based-Learning (CBL) or Problem-Based-Learning (PBL), in addition to any hospital facilitated educational activities.

Research project(s) are mandatory in the Master's level MD programs and optional in the Bachelor's level MBBS programs. This is in addition to encouraging students to be able to critically appraise literature and practice Evidence Based Medicine.

Assessments commonly include a mixture of written (MCQ, EMQ, short and long answer) and clinical exams (OSCE) at the end of each term or unit. Unlike in the United States where there is a standardised exam (USMLE) across the country in order to become licensed to practise medicine, Australian medical school exit exams are set by the individual medical school and serve as the qualifying exam to be eligible for Medical Board registration. Successful completion of medical school allows the graduate to be registered provisionally with the Medical Board and proceed to applying for an internship. It is not until speciality training where there are standardised examinations held across the nation that is facilitated by respective medical speciality colleges.

Current Australian medical schools and their basic qualifying medical degrees are listed below:

University	Current Degree(s)	Duration	Australian Qualifications Framework level	Entry	Previous Degree(s)
University of Adelaide	BMedSt/MD	6 years	9	Undergraduate	MBBS
Australian National University	MChD	4 years	9	Graduate	MBBS
Bond University	BMedSt/MD	4.7 years	9	Undergraduate	MBBS
Deakin University	MD	4 years	9	Graduate	BMBS
Flinders University	MD	4 years	9	Graduate	BMBS
Griffith University	MD	4 years	9	Graduate	MBBS
James Cook University	MBBS	6 years	7	Undergraduate	—N/a
University of Melbourne	MD	4 years	9	Graduate	BMedSc/MBBS
Monash University	BMedSc/MD	5 years	9	Undergraduate	MBBS, MBBS(Hons)
Monash University	BMedSc/MD	4 years	9	Graduate	MBBS, MBBS(Hons)
University of Newcastle	BMedSc/MD	5 years	9	Undergraduate	BMed
University of New England	BMedSc/MD	5 years	9	Undergraduate	BMed
University of New South Wales	BMed/MD	6 years	9	Undergraduate	MBBS
University of Notre Dame Australia	MD	4 years	9	Graduate	MBBS
University of Queensland	MD	4 years	9	Graduate	MBBS
University of Sydney	MD	4 years	9	Graduate	MBBS
University of Sydney	BSc/MD or BA/MD	7 years	9	Undergraduate	BA(Adv)(Hons)/MBBS, BSc(Adv)/MBBS, BMedSci/MBBS, BComm/MBBS, BEcon/MBBS, BMusSt/MBBS
University of Tasmania	BMedScMD	5 years	9	Undergraduate	MBBS
University of Western Australia	MD	4 years	9	Graduate	MBBS
Western Sydney University	BClinSci/MD	5 years	9	Undergraduate	MBBS
Charles Sturt University	BClinSci/MD	5 years	9	Undergraduate	
University of Wollongong	MD	4 years	9	Graduate	MBBS
Curtin University	MBBS	5 years	7	Undergraduate	—N/a
Macquarie University	MD	4 years	9	Graduate	—N/a

== Internship ==
Internship is a period of mandatory supervised general clinical experience. It allows medical graduates to consolidate and apply clinical knowledge and skills while taking increasing responsibility for the provision of safe, high quality patient care. Diagnostic skills, communication skills, management skills, including therapeutic and procedural skills, and professionalism are developed under appropriate supervision. Internship also informs career choices for many graduates by providing experience in different medical specialities including general practice, and providing a grounding for subsequent vocational (specialist) training.

The Medical Board of Australia has established the Intern Registration Standard. It defines the supervised intern (provisional registration year) training requirements that must be completed in order for graduates of Australian and New Zealand medical programs accredited by the Australian Medical Council and approved by the Medical Board of Australia to be eligible for general registration.

Graduates of these programs of study are required to hold provisional registration and to satisfactorily complete 12 months of supervised practice as an intern before being eligible for general registration. Whereby, general registration indicates that the practitioner has the skills, knowledge and experience to work as a safe entry level medical practitioner able to practise within the limits of their training.

Interns are required to perform satisfactorily under supervision in the following terms:

- at least 8 weeks that provides experience in emergency medical care
- at least 10 weeks that provides experience in medicine
- at least 10 weeks that provides experience in surgery
- a range of other approved terms to make up 12 months (minimum of 47 weeks full-time equivalent service).

There are usually four or five terms in an internship (between 10 and 12 weeks duration). Interns are required to complete three core terms in medicine, surgery and emergency care and other (non-core) rotations make up the balance of the intern year providing opportunities to explore additional areas of medicine and surgery, anaesthesia, psychiatry, paediatrics and less acute care such as rehabilitation medicine, palliative care, geriatrics and general practice.

Internships are positions facilitated and funded by both State Governments and the Commonwealth (federal) Government. In 2016, there were 3314 state-funded intern positions and 100 Commonwealth funded intern positions. With the increasing number of medical graduates, there have been concerns about the number of available internships.

Applications for internships are typically coordinated by the relevant State Government's Health Department through an annual recruitment campaign. Applicants have the opportunity to preference the district and/or hospital(s) they wish to be employed at, and are selected based on a combination of a ballot-based and merit-based system. The Australian Medical Student Association provides a yearly Internship Guide to help guide medical graduates in their application process, as well as providing general information about the different State and Territory Health systems and clinical opportunities available at the various hospitals.

== Residency ==
Residency, for most doctors in Australia, is typically a further one or two years following internship spent working in the hospital (or occasionally, in community health settings) to gain more clinical experience in a range of settings with increased levels of responsibility. In contrast to medical education following the United States system, internship and residency in Australia are considered pre-vocational terms where doctors have yet to formally commence their training in a specific speciality. While some specialist medical colleges accept entrants after successful completion of internship or postgraduate year 1 (PGY-1), most prefer applicants to have completed at least a further 2 to 3 years (or more) of pre-vocational training at the level of a resident (PGY-2 to PGY-3 or more) in order to have gained sufficient additional clinical experience prior to applying for a specialist training program. Clinical rotations and terms are at the preference of the resident (and dependent on the availability of the health service); there are no mandatory terms to fulfill; for example, if the resident has aspirations to pursue enrolment in surgical speciality training, they would preference and request more rotations in the various surgical specialties (for instance, Neurosurgery, Cardiothoracic, or Urology), versus if the resident had interests to pursue emergency medicine, he or she would probably benefit from further rotations in the various critical care specialties (that is, Intensive Care Medicine, Emergency Medicine, or Anaesthetics).

During residency, these clinicians are known by a variety of terms, including but not limited to:

- Resident Medical Officer (RMO) or Senior Resident Medical Officer (SRMO);
- Junior House Officer (JHO) or Senior House Officer (SHO) or Principal House Officer (PHO);
- Hospital Medical Officer (HMO); or,
- Trainee Medical Officer (TMO).

Residents typically have general registration with the Medical Board of Australia; that is, having successfully completed internship in Australia. Whilst the Medical Board no longer requires performance reports to be submitted directly to them, it mandates and delegates the responsibility to the relevant hospital administration, post-graduate medical councils and speciality colleges, to ensure the continual support, education and teaching of their residents (and registrars) as well as ensuring routine performance reviews and term reports from senior clinicians supervising their practice.

Applications for residency is similar to that of internship, and is coordinated by the relevant State government through an annual recruitment campaign. Applicants have the opportunity to preference the district and/or hospital(s) they wish to be employed at, and are selected on a merit-based system which typically includes a review of the applicant's resume, interview, and referee reports.

== Registrarship / Speciality Training Programs ==
=== Registrars ===
Registrars are doctors formally enrolled and accredited into a speciality (also known as 'vocational') training program; hence, they are also known as "trainee specialists". After completing internship and one or more additional years as a resident and meeting the pre-requisites for the relevant speciality college, doctors can apply for admission to a recognised medical speciality training program. Registrarship or vocational specialty training is akin to an apprenticeship or clerkship in other professions. It is a period of on-the-job training and assessments in order to qualify for fellowship of one of the recognised specialist medical colleges, which allows a doctor to practice medicine independently and unsupervised in that relevant speciality field, and with this access to an unrestricted Medicare provider number and Medical Board specialist registration.

Selection into a speciality training programs are based upon merit and are highly competitive. Nowadays, most colleges require applicants to have previous clinical supervisors submit referee reports, and fulfil a number of criteria in their curriculum vitae (CV) which typically involve scoring the candidate in four domains:

1. Demonstrated clinical experience at the level of a resident or unaccredited registrar relevant to the speciality applied for
2. Academic excellence in addition to the basic medical degree including research publications and higher educational degrees
3. Pre-requisite completion of recommended workshops or courses, and if any, entrance examinations or assessments
4. Extra-curricular activities and merits that demonstrate a well-rounded individual

Applicants with satisfactory CV are invited to partake in interviews or assessments that typically assess adequate medical knowledge to commence speciality training and explore psycho-socially if the candidate if suitable for the speciality.

Registrars pay an annual enrolment fee to be part of the speciality college (in addition to fees for exams and courses). In order to qualify for election to fellowship and specialist recognition, most specialist colleges have clinical, practical and exit exams, in conjunction with other assessments to assess the full range of skills and behaviours required as a doctor, such as communication and team work. Specialist training programs and examinations are administered by the individual colleges and vary between three and seven full-time years to complete, depending upon the speciality you choose. Part-time training is available to most specialities, and dual-speciality-training is optional and streamlined for some specialities. Vocational training for most medical specialities is undertaken in a public teaching hospital, however it increasingly includes rotations in private hospitals, regional, rural and community health settings. The exception is general practice, where doctors undertake most of their training in designated private general practices in a community setting.

Registrars are nonetheless employed and remunerated by the hospital at which they work for; and thus, are still required to submit an application for a position through the recruitment campaigns coordinated by the relevant State government's ministry of health. That said, some colleges help allocate employment and allocation to various training sites and hospitals to streamline the traineeship and employment obligations, whereas some colleges leave this entirely to the discretion of the trainee.

Registrars are typically classified into :

1. Junior Registrar; typically refers to trainees who are in the basic or primary phase of their specialty training; assessments are typically a requirement to progress to the advanced training phase
2. Senior Registrar; typically refers to trainees who are in the advanced phase of their specialty training; assessments are typically a requirement to become eligible to complete training and attain fellowship
3. Fellow; typically refers to trainees who have successfully completed specialty training and eligible for specialty fellowship but are not yet formally employed at the grade of a specialist medical practitioner
  - time spent as a Fellow is either a mandatory or optional requirement by some specialties in order to further develop sub-specialty skillsets and/or ensure and further prepare newly or soon-to-be qualified specialist medical practitioner

Registrars are comparable to Residents in the United States medical system; that is, at this stage of their medical career, both are undergoing specialty training. As aforementioned, Residents in the Australian medical system are doctors who have completed internship and undergoing additional years of general clinical rotations to gain further experience, prior to enrolling into a specialty training program. In the United States, choice of specialty is decided upon commencing Internship, such that clinical rotations and specialty training requirements are streamlined early on and flows straight on to Residency. There is no requirement in the United States for junior doctors to complete "pre-vocational/pre-specialist" training or experience general clinical rotations prior to specialty training enrolment; which is in contrast to Australian and other Commonwealth medical systems that choose to keep this traditional format in view that it ensures junior doctors receive holistic training and generalist exposure in various specialties of medicine before choosing a specialty to pursue.

=== Unaccredited Registrars ===
"Unaccredited" registrars are doctors who are fulfilling the higher duties and role of a specialist registrar at a hospital, but do not receive credit toward fellowship in a specialty training program for their time spent working in the role. They may also not receive the protected training benefits of an accredited training position. They typically come from the cadre of senior residents with adequately more experience and aspirations to pursue that specific specialty as a career, but have yet to meet the pre-requisites to formally enroll into the specialist training program and become an accredited specialist trainee; where typically time spent working and training as an unaccredited registrar does not usually count towards formal specialty training time. Unaccredited registrars help fulfil shortages in hospital services where otherwise an accredited registrar is unable to be recruited; thus, they are sometimes also known as "service" registrars.

Doctors who choose to take up the role of an unaccredited registrar are typically those:

1. needing to meet the pre-requisites to gain sufficient exposure and experience in that certain specialty at a more senior level of a registrar, and to acquire favourable referee reports from supervisors, in order to successfully enrol into the specialist training program thereafter becoming an accredited registrar (e.g. a senior resident who has applied to work as an unaccredited registrar in order to gain more experience so that he or she may enrol into a formal surgical specialist training program later on).
2. having no intention of pursuing that specialty itself, but looking to gain more experience and training at a more senior level as a registrar in order to improve their overall clinical knowledge and competence (e.g. clinicians intending to work as a hospitalist or general practitioner rotating through intensive care to acquire more clinical skills in critical care).

=== Medical Specialist Colleges ===
In Australia, the Australian Medical Council has recognised 16 medical speciality colleges responsible for the continued education, training, and accreditation standards of their respective specialities:

Medical Specialist Colleges of Australia
Organisation	Speciality	Fellowship Awarded	Minimum Years of Training	Titles (Formal, Informal)
Australasian College for Emergency Medicine	Emergency Medicine	Fellowship of the Australasian College for Emergency Medicine (FACEM)	5 years	Specialist emergency physician Emergency specialist
Australasian College of Dermatologists	Dermatology	Fellowship of the Australasian College of Dermatologists (FACD)	4 years	Specialist dermatologist
Australasian College of Sport and Exercise Physicians	Sports & Exercise Medicine	Fellowship of the Australasian College of Sport and Exercise Physicians (FACSEP)	4 years	Specialist sport and exercise physician
Australian and New Zealand College of Anaesthetists	Anaesthesia	Fellowship of the Australian and New Zealand College of Anaesthetists (FANZCA)	5 years	Specialist anaesthetist Anaesthetist
Australian and New Zealand College of Anaesthetists	Pain Medicine	Fellowship of the Faculty of Pain Medicine, Australian and New Zealand College of Anaesthetists (FFPMANZCA)	1 to 3 years	Specialist pain medicine physician Pain doctor Pain specialist
Australian College of Rural and Remote Medicine	General Practice (Rural Generalist)	Fellowship of the Australian College of Rural and Remote Medicine (FACRRM)	4 years	Specialist general practitioner Specialist rural generalist General practitioner (GP); Rural generalist (RG)
College of Intensive Care Medicine	Intensive Care Medicine (Adult)	Fellowship of the College of Intensive Care Medicine of Australia and New Zealand (FCICM)	6 years	Specialist intensive care physician Intensivist
College of Intensive Care Medicine	Intensive Care Medicine (Paediatric)	Fellowship of the College of Intensive Care Medicine of Australia and New Zealand (FCICM)	6 years	Specialist paediatric intensive care physician Paediatric intensivist
Royal Australasian College of Dental Surgeons	Oral & Maxillofacial Surgery	Fellowship of the Royal Australasian College of Dental Surgeons (Oral Maxillofacial Surgery) (FRACDS (OMS))	4 years	Specialist oral and maxillofacial surgeon
Royal Australasian College of Surgeons		Fellowship of the Royal Australasian College of Surgeons (FRACS)	5 to 7 years	Specialist surgeon
Royal Australasian College of Surgeons	Cardio-thoracic surgery	Fellowship of the Royal Australasian College of Surgeons (FRACS)	5 to 7 years	Specialist cardio-thoracic surgeon Cardio-thoracic surgeon
Royal Australasian College of Surgeons	General surgery	Fellowship of the Royal Australasian College of Surgeons (FRACS)	5 to 7 years	Specialist general surgeon General surgeon
Royal Australasian College of Surgeons	Neurosurgery	Fellowship of the Royal Australasian College of Surgeons (FRACS)	5 to 7 years	Specialist neurosurgeon Neurosurgeon
Royal Australasian College of Surgeons	Orthopaedic surgery	Fellowship of the Royal Australasian College of Surgeons (FRACS)	5 to 7 years	Specialist orthopaedic surgeon Orthopaedic surgeon
Royal Australasian College of Surgeons	Otolaryngology & Head and Neck surgery	Fellowship of the Royal Australasian College of Surgeons (FRACS)	5 to 7 years	Specialist otolaryngologist - head and neck surgeon ENT surgeon
Royal Australasian College of Surgeons	Paediatric surgery	Fellowship of the Royal Australasian College of Surgeons (FRACS)	5 to 7 years	Specialist paediatric surgeon Paediatric surgeon
Royal Australasian College of Surgeons	Plastic & Reconstructive surgery	Fellowship of the Royal Australasian College of Surgeons (FRACS)	5 to 7 years	Specialist plastic surgeon Plastic surgeon
Royal Australasian College of Surgeons	Urology	Fellowship of the Royal Australasian College of Surgeons (FRACS)	5 to 7 years	Specialist urologist Urologist
Royal Australasian College of Surgeons	Vascular surgery	Fellowship of the Royal Australasian College of Surgeons (FRACS)	5 to 7 years	Specialist vascular surgeon Vascular surgeon
Royal Australasian College of Medical Administrators	Medical Administration	Fellowship of the Royal Australasian College of Medical Administrators (FRACMA)	3 years	Specialist medical administrator
Royal Australasian College of Physicians		Fellowship of the Royal Australasian College of Physicians (FRACP)	6 years	Specialist physician Physician
Royal Australasian College of Physicians	Cardiology	Fellowship of the Royal Australasian College of Physicians (FRACP)	6 years	Specialist cardiologist Cardiologist
Royal Australasian College of Physicians	Clinical genetics	Fellowship of the Royal Australasian College of Physicians (FRACP)	6 years	Specialist clinical geneticist Geneticist
Royal Australasian College of Physicians	Clinical pharmacology	Fellowship of the Royal Australasian College of Physicians (FRACP)	6 years	Specialist clinical pharmacologist Pharmacologist
Royal Australasian College of Physicians	Endocrinology	Fellowship of the Royal Australasian College of Physicians (FRACP)	6 years	Specialist endocrinologist Endocrinologist
Royal Australasian College of Physicians	Gastroenterology and hepatology	Fellowship of the Royal Australasian College of Physicians (FRACP)	6 years	Specialist gastroenterologist and hepatologist Gastroenterologist; Hepatologist
Royal Australasian College of Physicians	General and acute care medicine	Fellowship of the Royal Australasian College of Physicians (FRACP)	6 years	Specialist general physician
Royal Australasian College of Physicians	Geriatric medicine	Fellowship of the Royal Australasian College of Physicians (FRACP)	6 years	Specialist geriatrician Geriatrician
Royal Australasian College of Physicians	Haematology	Fellowship of the Royal Australasian College of Physicians (FRACP)	6 years	Specialist haematologist Haematologist
Royal Australasian College of Physicians	Immunology and allergy	Fellowship of the Royal Australasian College of Physicians (FRACP)	6 years	Specialist immunologist and allergist Immunologist
Royal Australasian College of Physicians	Infectious diseases and/or microbiology	Fellowship of the Royal Australasian College of Physicians (FRACP)	6 years	Specialist infectious disease physician Infectious disease specialist
Royal Australasian College of Physicians	Medical oncology	Fellowship of the Royal Australasian College of Physicians (FRACP)	6 years	Specialist medical oncologist Oncologist
Royal Australasian College of Physicians	Nephrology	Fellowship of the Royal Australasian College of Physicians (FRACP)	6 years	Specialist nephrologist Nephrologist
Royal Australasian College of Physicians	Neurology	Fellowship of the Royal Australasian College of Physicians (FRACP)	6 years	Specialist neurologist Neurologist
Royal Australasian College of Physicians	Nuclear medicine	Fellowship of the Royal Australasian College of Physicians (FRACP)	6 years	Specialist nuclear medicine physician Nuclear medicine specialist
Royal Australasian College of Physicians	Respiratory and sleep medicine	Fellowship of the Royal Australasian College of Physicians (FRACP)	6 years	Specialist respiratory and sleep medicine physician Respiratory specialist Sleep specialist
Royal Australasian College of Physicians	Rheumatology	Fellowship of the Royal Australasian College of Physicians (FRACP)	6 years	Specialist rheumatologist Rheumatologist
Royal Australasian College of Physicians	Paediatrics and child health	Fellowship of the Royal Australasian College of Physicians (FRACP)	6 years	Specialist paediatrician Paediatrician
Royal Australasian College of Physicians	Paediatrics and child health – Clinical genetics	Fellowship of the Royal Australasian College of Physicians (FRACP)	6 years	Specialist paediatric clinical geneticist Paediatric geneticist
Royal Australasian College of Physicians	Paediatrics and child health – Community child health	Fellowship of the Royal Australasian College of Physicians (FRACP)	6 years	Specialist in community child health
Royal Australasian College of Physicians	Paediatrics and child health – General paediatrics	Fellowship of the Royal Australasian College of Physicians (FRACP)	6 years	Specialist general paediatrician Paediatrician
Royal Australasian College of Physicians	Paediatrics and child health – Neonatal and perinatal medicine	Fellowship of the Royal Australasian College of Physicians (FRACP)	6 years	Specialist neonatologist Neonatologist
Royal Australasian College of Physicians	Paediatric cardiology	Fellowship of the Royal Australasian College of Physicians (FRACP)	6 years	Specialist paediatric cardiologist
Royal Australasian College of Physicians	Paediatric clinical pharmacology	Fellowship of the Royal Australasian College of Physicians (FRACP)	6 years	Specialist paediatric clinical pharmacologist
Royal Australasian College of Physicians	Paediatric emergency medicine	Fellowship of the Royal Australasian College of Physicians (FRACP)	6 years	Specialist paediatric emergency physician
Royal Australasian College of Physicians	Paediatric endocrinology	Fellowship of the Royal Australasian College of Physicians (FRACP)	6 years	Specialist paediatric endocrinologist
Royal Australasian College of Physicians	Paediatric gastroenterology and hepatology	Fellowship of the Royal Australasian College of Physicians (FRACP)	6 years	Specialist paediatric gastroenterologist and hepatologist
Royal Australasian College of Physicians	Paediatric haematology	Fellowship of the Royal Australasian College of Physicians (FRACP)	6 years	Specialist paediatric haematologist
Royal Australasian College of Physicians	Paediatric immunology and allergy	Fellowship of the Royal Australasian College of Physicians (FRACP)	6 years	Specialist paediatric immunologist and allergist
Royal Australasian College of Physicians	Paediatric infectious diseases	Fellowship of the Royal Australasian College of Physicians (FRACP)	6 years	Specialist paediatric infectious disease physician
Royal Australasian College of Physicians	Paediatric medical oncology	Fellowship of the Royal Australasian College of Physicians (FRACP)	6 years	Specialist paediatric medical oncologist
Royal Australasian College of Physicians	Paediatric nephrology	Fellowship of the Royal Australasian College of Physicians (FRACP)	6 years	Specialist paediatric nephrologist
Royal Australasian College of Physicians	Paediatric neurology	Fellowship of the Royal Australasian College of Physicians (FRACP)	6 years	Specialist paediatric neurologist
Royal Australasian College of Physicians	Paediatric nuclear medicine	Fellowship of the Royal Australasian College of Physicians (FRACP)	6 years	Specialist paediatric nuclear medicine physician
Royal Australasian College of Physicians	Paediatric palliative medicine	Fellowship of the Royal Australasian College of Physicians (FRACP)	6 years	Specialist paediatric palliative medicine physician
Royal Australasian College of Physicians	Paediatric rehabilitation medicine	Fellowship of the Royal Australasian College of Physicians (FRACP)	6 years	Specialist paediatric rehabilitation physician
Royal Australasian College of Physicians	Paediatric respiratory and sleep medicine	Fellowship of the Royal Australasian College of Physicians (FRACP)	6 years	Specialist paediatric respiratory and sleep medicine physician Paedatric respiratory specialist Paediatric sleep specialist
Royal Australasian College of Physicians	Paediatric rheumatology	Fellowship of the Royal Australasian College of Physicians (FRACP)	6 years	Specialist paediatric rheumatologist
Royal Australasian College of Physicians	Addiction medicine	Fellowship of the Australasian Chapter of Addiction Medicine (FAChAM)	3 years	Specialist in addiction medicine
Royal Australasian College of Physicians	Palliative care	Fellowship of the Australasian Chapter of Palliative Medicine (FAChPM)	3 years	Specialist palliative medicine physician Palliative care specialist Palliative physician
Royal Australasian College of Physicians	Sexual health medicine	Fellowship of the Australasian Chapter of Sexual Health Medicine (FAChSHM)	3 years	Specialist sexual health physician
Royal Australasian College of Physicians	Rehabilitation medicine	Fellowship of the Australasian Faculty of Rehabilitation Medicine (FAFRM)	4 years	Specialist rehabilitation physician
Royal Australasian College of Physicians	Occupational and environmental medicine	Fellowship of the Australasian Faculty of Occupational and Environmental Medicine (FAFOEM)	4 years	Specialist occupational and environmental physician
Royal Australasian College of Physicians	Public health medicine	Fellowship of the Australasian Faculty of Public Health Medicine (FAFPHM)	3 years	Specialist public health physician
Royal Australian and New Zealand College of Obstetricians and Gynaecologists		Fellowship of the Royal Australian and New Zealand College of Obstetricians and Gynaecologists (FRANZCOG)	6 years	Specialist obstetrician and gynocologist Obstetrician; Gynocologist; OB-GYN
Royal Australian and New Zealand College of Obstetricians and Gynaecologists	Gynaecological oncology	Fellowship of the Royal Australian and New Zealand College of Obstetricians and Gynaecologists (FRANZCOG)	6 years	Specialist gynaecological oncologist
Royal Australian and New Zealand College of Obstetricians and Gynaecologists	Maternal-fetal medicine	Fellowship of the Royal Australian and New Zealand College of Obstetricians and Gynaecologists (FRANZCOG)	6 years	Specialist in maternal-fetal medicine
Royal Australian and New Zealand College of Obstetricians and Gynaecologists	Obstetrics and gynaecological ultrasound	Fellowship of the Royal Australian and New Zealand College of Obstetricians and Gynaecologists (FRANZCOG)	6 years	Specialist in obstetrics and gynaecological ultrasound
Royal Australian and New Zealand College of Obstetricians and Gynaecologists	Reproductive endocrinology and infertility	Fellowship of the Royal Australian and New Zealand College of Obstetricians and Gynaecologists (FRANZCOG)	6 years	Specialist in endocrinology and infertility
Royal Australian and New Zealand College of Obstetricians and Gynaecologists	Urogynaecology	Fellowship of the Royal Australian and New Zealand College of Obstetricians and Gynaecologists (FRANZCOG)	6 years	Specialist urogynaecologist Urogynaecologist
Royal Australian and New Zealand College of Ophthalmologists	Ophthalmology	Fellowship of the Royal Australian and New Zealand College of Ophthalmologists (FRANZCO)	5 years	Specialist ophthalmologist
Royal Australian and New Zealand College of Psychiatrists	Addiction psychiatry Adult psychiatry Child and adolescent psychiatry Consultation-liaison psychiatry Forensic psychiatry Neuropsychiatry Old age psychiatry Perinatal and infant psychiatry Psychiatry of intellectual and development disabilities Psychiatric psychotherapy	Fellowship of the Royal Australian and New Zealand College of Psychiatrists (FRANZCP)	5 years	Specialist psychiatrist Psychiatrist
Royal Australian and New Zealand College of Radiologists	Diagnostic radiology	Fellowship of the Royal Australian and New Zealand College of Radiologists (FRANZCR)	5 years	Specialist radiologist
Royal Australian and New Zealand College of Radiologists	Nuclear medicine Interventional radiology Radiation oncology	Fellowship of the Royal Australian and New Zealand College of Radiologists (FRANZCR)	5 years	Specialist in nuclear medicine
Royal Australian College of General Practitioners	General Practice	Fellowship of the Royal Australian College of General Practitioners (FRACGP)	3 years	Specialist general practitioner General practitioner (GP)
Royal Australian College of General Practitioners	General Practice (Rural Generalist)	Rural Generalist Fellowship of the Royal Australian College of General Practitioners (FRACGP-RG)	4 years	Specialist general practitioner General practitioner (GP)
Royal College of Pathologists of Australasia		Fellowship of the Royal College of Pathologists of Australasia (FRCPA)	5 years	Specialist pathologist Pathologist
Royal College of Pathologists of Australasia	General pathology	Fellowship of the Royal College of Pathologists of Australasia (FRCPA)	5 years	Specialist general pathologist Pathologist
Royal College of Pathologists of Australasia	Anatomical pathology	Fellowship of the Royal College of Pathologists of Australasia (FRCPA)	5 years	Specialist anatomical pathology
Royal College of Pathologists of Australasia	Chemical pathology	Fellowship of the Royal College of Pathologists of Australasia (FRCPA)	5 years	Specialist chemical pathologist
Royal College of Pathologists of Australasia	Haematology	Fellowship of the Royal College of Pathologists of Australasia (FRCPA)	5 years	Specialist haematologist
Royal College of Pathologists of Australasia	Immunology	Fellowship of the Royal College of Pathologists of Australasia (FRCPA)	5 years	Specialist immunologist
Royal College of Pathologists of Australasia	Microbiology	Fellowship of the Royal College of Pathologists of Australasia (FRCPA)	5 years	Specialist microbiologist
Royal College of Pathologists of Australasia	Forensic pathology	Fellowship of the Royal College of Pathologists of Australasia (FRCPA)	5 years	Specialist forensic pathologist

== Other Non-Specialist Medical Practitioners (Career Medical Officers) ==
In Australia, 'other medical practitioners' typically include career hospital doctors or career medical officers or hospitalists. They are typically beyond the internship and residency phase of their career, but have made a conscious career choice not to partake in vocational-specialist training to acquire fellowship specialist qualification. Whilst not specialists, these clinicians are nonetheless senior in their years of medical practice, and depending on their scope of practice and experience, they typically work with a reasonable degree of independence and autonomy under the auspices of their specialist colleagues and supervisors. Career medical officers form a demographically small but important workforce of doctors in hospitals across Australia where on-site specialist medical practitioner coverage is otherwise limited or unavailable.

The commonest pathway in medicine, is to complete medical school, then internship and residency, before finally completing a specialty training program as a registrar thereby becoming a specialist medical practitioner. Career medical officers typically come from clinicians who have completed their internship, residency, and usually some further formal or informal rotations as a registrar, but have decided not to, or have yet not, complete their vocational specialty training. The reasons for why hospitalists choose their career track are varied, some of which include:

- doctors who do not have any intentions of specialising as a conscious career choice and prefer working as a non-specialist hospitalist clinician;
- doctors who practice in a specialised area of medicine with seniority and experience but this specialised area of medicine is not formally recognised as a specialty (such as a Medical Practitioner working in the field of Clinical Forensic Medicine with a qualification in this area of medicine that is not yet recognised or accredited by the Australian Medical Council and AHPRA);
- doctors who practice in a specialised area of medicine with seniority and experience but have not been formally recognised as a specialist medical practitioner (such as a Medical Practitioner who is an International Medical Graduate with specialist qualifications of a Cardiologist in their home country that is not recognised by the relevant accredited specialty college, the Australian Medical Council and AHPRA);
- doctors who do not or did not meet the requirements for specialty training;
- doctors who are intending to specialise in the future but not at this moment;
- doctors who have completed specialty training in a field but have decided to seek (primary or secondary) employment as a non-specialist hospital clinician (such as a fellowship qualified General Practitioner working part-time as a Career Medical Officer in the Emergency Department or as a Surgical Assistant);
- doctors who are concurrently in the process of specialising but are taking temporary leave from their specialty training and/or additionally working as a non-specialist clinician elsewhere usually in the capacity of a temporary locum tenens (such as a Resident or Registrar at a public teaching hospital working part-time or casually as a Career Medical Officer at a private hospital).

These clinicians are also known by a variety of terms, including but not limited to:

- Hospitalist
- Senior Medical Officer (SMO)
- Multi-skilled Medical Officer (MMO)
- Career Hospital Doctor

Career medical officers are typically employed in a variety of public and private hospital settings on a contractual or salaried basis. Traditionally, career medical officers or hospitalists are employed as permanent full-time or part-time staff, but more commonly in recent times, due to a significant workforce of clinicians been in-flux with their specialty training and insufficient staffing of middle-grade clinicians at hospitals, there has been an increase supply and demand for career medical officers on a locum tenens or casual basis. Dependent on their place of employment and duties, the responsibilities and remuneration of non-specialist career medical officers are usually comparable to somewhere between registrars and consultants. Despite the common trend for clinicians to specialise nowadays, non-specialist hospitalist clinicians have an important role in fulfilling shortages in the medical workforce, especially when specialist medical practitioner coverage and accessibility is unavailable, where there is an area-of-need, and after-hours or on-site medical care is required. These clinicians and employed across Australia in a variety of clinical environments which include Medical & Surgical Wards, Mental Health Units, Intensive Care Units and Emergency Departments. Nonetheless, these clinicians work closely and continually consult with the relevant attending specialist medical practitioner on-call; that is, final responsibility and care for the patient ultimately still rests with the attending specialist medical practitioner.

The Australian Medical Association (AMA), Australasian Society of Career Medical Officers (ASCMO) and Australian Salaried Medical Officers Federation (AMSOF) are organisations that represent this group of medical practitioners. Despite being non-specialist medical practitioners, they are still required to meet continuing professional development requirements and frequently attend courses facilitated by these organisations and the hospitals to keep their practice and skillsets up-to-date alongside their specialist medical practitioner colleagues.

=== Non-Vocationally Registered General Practitioners ===
Since 1996, General Practice has been formally recognised as a speciality with a formal vocational specialist training pathway. Historically, those wishing to practice as a General Practitioner (GP) without specialist registration, otherwise known as non-Vocationally Registered (non-VR) GP, could only do so in designated areas-of-need (such as that of rural townships) and at the compromise of only been able to invoice for limited Medicare rebates. As of 2018, Non-VR GPs ceased to be recognised and are now considered in the category of other non-specialist medical practitioners. Similar to other specialties, those wishing to continue to practice in the specialty field of General Practice are required to attain a Fellowship of the Royal Australian College of General Practitioners (FRACGP) or Fellowship of the Australian College of Rural and Remote Medicine (FACRRM). The exception to this are those who were 'grandfathered' as already working as GPs for at least 5 years prior to 1996. Non-specialist medical practitioners are issued a restricted Medicare provider number that allows them to initiate referrals and request pathology and radiology investigations, but not access full Medicare billings.

== Specialist Medical Practitioners (General Practitioners & Consultants) ==
Upon completion of the prescribed specialty training program by the relevant medical specialty college, medical practitioners are awarded a fellowship of that college and eligible to register and be recognised as a specialist by their medical specialty college, Australian Health Practitioners Regulatory Agency and the Medical Board of Australia, which is annually renewed. Specialist medical practitioners are considered to have satisfied all the necessary education and training requirements and recognised as vocationally qualified to practise competently and safely for that medical speciality.

Medical practitioners with specialist registration are allowed to practice independently and unsupervised within their scope of practice, which in effect allows them to pursue private practice outside of public teaching hospitals. Specialist medical practitioners are eligible for an unrestricted Medicare provider number that allows clinicians to bill rebates from Medicare for services delivered to patients, privileges for hospital admissions and private health fund billings, where most patients in Australia are a mixture of publicly covered Medicare and privately insured through a health fund. Whilst most specialist medical practitioners take the opportunity to pursue private practice, many of them (with the exception of a majority of GPs) continue to work at least part-time as salaried employees in the state public hospitals. There is also an opportunity for specialists partake in hospital administration to take-up committee or managerial positions, such as director of their department or the hospital or health service, as well as being actively involved in the education and supervised training of their junior colleagues.

Specialist medical practitioners are typically recognised by their specialty profession name; for example, General Practitioner, Cardiologist, Radiologist, Pathologist, Haematologist, Nephrologist, Neurologist, Neurosurgeon, et cetera. Physician broadly refers to those who specialise in any of the adult or child non-surgical medical sub-specialities. Surgeon broadly refers to those who specialise in any of the surgical sub-specialities. Medical practitioners which have completed their specialist training are known by a variety of other terminology, including but not limited to:

- Staff Specialist
- Attending Medical Officer (AMO)
- Visiting Medical Officer (VMO)
- Senior Medical Officer (SMO)

Specialist medical practitioners are required, as part of mainting their specialist registration and fellow status, to partake in activities throughout the year ensuring their continued professional development (CPD) which is monitored and facilitated by their respective specialty medical college.

Additionally, while there is no requirement to do so, some clinicians at this stage of their career may consider further education (that is, if they have already not done so):

- Higher research or education degrees (such as Masters or PhD) or co-joint academic position at a university
- Fellowship placements (such as a neurosurgeon spending a year as a fellow in paediatric neurosurgery)
- Sub-specialisation (such as an emergency physician sub-specialising in toxicology)
- Second specialty qualification (such as an anaesthetist attaining a second-qualification to become an intensivist)

Furthermore, specialist medical practitioners may pursue senior executive, administrative or advisory roles, including but not limited to:

- Medical Director
- Chief Health Officer
- Chief Medical Officer
- Board or Committee Membership
- Executive of Hospital or Health Service
- Health Ministry Secretarial Appointments

=== Specialist General Practitioners & Rural Generalists ===
From 1996, General Practice in Australia became recognised as a specialist field of medicine with an accredited specialty training program; that is, similar to other specialty fields of medicine, vocationally registered or fellowship qualified General Practitioners are recognised as specialist medical practitioners by the Australian Health Practitioners Regulatory Agency (AHPRA) and Medical Board of Australia (MBA) as per the Health Practitioner Regulation National Law. Its specialised role in health care is providing general medical care to the community; it is comparable to the scope of practice of family physicians in the United States and Canada. A properly trained and qualified General Practitioner (GP) should be able to independently assess, diagnose and treat a wide variety and range of illnesses within their scope of practice prior to referral to their non-GP specialist colleagues. Typically, about half of medical practitioners become GPs and the other half pursue a non-GP specialty.

Most urban GPs work in community-based clinics and deliver predominantly primary care, with a subset of regional or rural GPs additionally working in public hospitals to deliver emergency or secondary care where there is a shortfall of non-GP specialist medical practitioners. It is not uncommon for GPs to also complete extended skills training to broaden their clinical scope of practice; insofar that it is encouraged and typical for GPs to proceed to attain formal accreditation in advanced areas of clinical practice (such as a GP who has postgraduate diplomas and accreditation to provide anaesthesiology or obstetric services) and/or formally complete additional fellowship in another specialty field of medicine (such as a GP who is also qualified as a public health physician or palliative care physician).

The Royal Australian College of General Practitioners (RACGP) and Australian College of Rural and Remote Medicine (ACRRM) are responsible for the accreditation, education and training of GPs in Australia; medical practitioners who complete the registrar training program are awarded a Fellowship of RACGP (FRACGP) and/or Fellowship of ACRRM (FACRRM) and recognised as Specialists in the field of General Practice. Registrarship and specialist/vocational training in General Practice is typically a minimum of 3 years or more than 4 years if additionally completing extended skills training to develop additional competencies to practice in rural and remote locations.

Rural Generalists are upskilled GPs with an expanded scope of practice that are capable of delivering emergency and secondary hospitalist medical care in rural and remote locations where non-GP specialist care and health resources are limited.

Rural Generalist Medicine has been formally recognised as a subspecialty within General Practice by the Australian Medical Council] and AHPRA. GPs who have acquired a FACRRM and/or a FRACGP plus Rural Generalist Fellowship (FRACGP-RG) are recognised as Specialist Rural Generalists.

Nevertheless, historically and colloquially the term 'Specialists' refers to medical practitioners qualified in a specialised field of medicine beyond the scope of General Practice (or Family Medicine). Medicare also makes this delineation for the purposes of appropriately allocating referrals, rebates and billings amongst GPs versus non-GP 'Specialist' Consultants. Medicare requires patients to see their GP first for a referral to see a Consultant (that is, if the patient intends to have Medicare subsidise costs associated with seeing the Consultant). In Australia, the healthcare system is predilected upon patients seeing their GP for an initial health assessment, prior to being referred to consult with a Consultant of a relevant specialty for further medical advice and treatment that may be beyond the scope of the GP, and then the Consultant returning the patient back to the GP for ongoing primary and shared care. This assists with minimising fragmentation of healthcare and improved allocation of health resources by having patients have their health managed and coordinated primarily by their GP.

Medical practitioners (that is namely Interns, Residents, Registrars, Career Medical Officers and other non-specialist medical practitioners) who have not attained specialist fellowship qualification or registration with AHPRA are issued a restricted Medicare provider number that allows them to initiate referrals and request diagnostic pathology and radiology investigative services, however not access Medicare billing benefits.

Medical practitioners who could demonstrate that they practiced for at least 5 years in General Practice prior to 1995 were not required to complete a specialty training program nor required to be awarded a fellowship by RACGP or ACRRM in order to be recognised as Specialist GPs by AHPRA and Medicare; these GPs were effectively 'grandfathered' onto the vocational/specialist register.

Historically, medical practitioners who practiced in General Practice without specialist registration and who were not formally enrolled as registrars working towards their FRACGP or FACRRM were known as non-vocationally registered (non-VR) GPs, and typically only practiced in areas-of-need with restricted access to Medicare billings. As of 2018, non-VR GPs ceased to be recognised by Medicare and are no longer be able to invoice for Medicare billings unless they formally enrol in a formal registrar training program to attain fellowship and be recognised as a specialist GP. Non-VR GPs essentially now fit into the category of 'Other Non-Specialist Medical Practitioners'. In order to practice in the specialty field of General Practice, similar to other non-GP specialties, medical practitioners must formally register as a registrar to complete a specialty training program with RACGP or ACRRM and attain fellowship status.

== Continuing Professional Development (CPD) ==
Continuing professional development (CPD) ensures clinicians remain up-to-date and evidence-based in their medical practice as mandated and audited by the Medical Board of Australia:

1. Medical practitioners with Specialist registration (that is, Specialist Medical Practitioners; General Practitioners and Consultants) must continue to meet the CPD requirements set out and logged by their relevant speciality college.
2. Medical practitioners with General registration only and not enrolled (nor have intentions to enrol) in a specialty-vocational training program (that is, Other Non-Specialist Medical Practitioners; Hospitalists) must continue to complete a minimum of 50 hours CPD per year and enrol into CPD home program and have their educational activities logged accordingly.
3. Medical practitioners with General registration only and enrolled in specialty-vocational training program (that is, Registrars) must attend relevant educational activities and complete assessment requirements as part of their training obligations as monitored and facilitated by their specialty college and clinical supervisors at their teaching hospital or clinic.
4. Medical practitioners with General registration only and working in a pre-vocational training capacity (that is, Residents) must attend relevant educational activities and complete performance reviews as facilitated by clinical supervisors at their teaching hospital or clinic.
5. Medical practitioners with Provisional or Limited registration (that is, Interns or International Medical Graduates), must complete a term of supervised practice, meet the educational standards set and successfully complete any assessments during that probational period as set by the Medical Board and/or Specialty College and/or teaching hospital or clinic, prior to been eligible for General or Specialist registration.

Education of junior doctors (that is, Interns to Residents to Registrars) is typically arranged on a regular basis by the hospital at which these clinicians work at and are facilitated by the senior staff specialist clinicians, as well as a proportion of self-directed learning in their own time. The forms of education can include but not limited to:

- Formal lectures and teaching sessions
- Case presentations
- Informal bedside teaching
- Research and clinical trials
- Morbidity and mortality ("M&M") meetings
- Grand Rounds
- Clinical skill workshops and courses
- Journal club
- Simulations
- Committees
- Audits

Education of fellowship qualified General Practitioners and Consultants, is typically facilitated by the relevant specialty medical college; with each college having its own CPD program. Similarly, Career Medical Officers and Registrars financially enrolled in a specialty college as non-fellow or trainee member may also partake in the CPD program and educational activities, some of which are highly recommended or mandatory. Most specialty colleges use a points-based system to keep track of the clinician's CPD obligations for each year, with each specific activity attracting a certain number of points (for instance, attending a conference or workshop may be worth 3 CPD points, whereas reading a journal article and completing the online quiz may be worth 1 CPD point). There are certain education modules that are mandatory for specialists and their trainee-registrars, and others which are optionally recommended to be completed at the preference of the clinician.

From 2023, AHPRA and MBA has mandated that CPD must consist of at least 50 hours, which is made of the following components:

- Minimum of 12.5 hours of educational activity
- Minimum of 25 hours of performance review and outcome measurement, which is to include:
  - Minimum of 5 hours of performance review
  - Minimum of 5 hours of outcome measurement

Mandatory education activities typically require the clinician to participate in activities that ensures ongoing up-to-date competency and receive feedback on core skills and clinical knowledge related to their scope of practice. These typically include:

- Ensuring up-to-date first aid and resuscitation skills certification; such as, CPR, ALS, APLS, EMST (ATLS), et cetera
- Ensuring an up-to-date logbook of core skills and procedures; such as, performing at least 3 endotracheal intubations annually
- Participating in a clinical audit of patients seen by the clinician or colleagues within their department
- Participating in a performance review and receiving feedback from a senior colleague

In addition to the above hospital-based education already mentioned, additional forms of self-directed education include such activities as accredited online learning platforms that provide modules aligned with the Medical Board of Australia’s CPD framework. For example, Ausmed delivers accredited continuing professional development (CPD) education for healthcare practitioners across Australia and is profiled by the Australian Government’s Healthdirect service as a CPD education provider.

- Participating as an attendee or instructor at workshops and courses
- Subscription to journals including online educational resources
- Conferences or seminars
- Academic appointment

=== Recency of Practice ===
To meet the standard, medical practitioners must practise within their scope of practice at any time for a minimum total of:

- 4 weeks full-time equivalent in one registration period, which is a total of 152 hours, or
- 12 weeks full-time equivalent over three consecutive registration periods, which is a total of 456 hours.

Full-time equivalent is 38 hours per week. The maximum number of hours that can be counted per week is 38 hours. Medical practitioners who work part-time must complete the same minimum number of hours of practice – this can be completed part-time.

== See also ==
- Medical Schools in Australia
- Category:Schools of medicine in Australia
- Category:Teaching hospitals in Australia
