= Australian College of Rural and Remote Medicine =

The Australian College of Rural and Remote Medicine
- Abbreviation: ACRRM
- Formation: 1997
- Purpose: Rural and Remote Medicine
- Headquarters: Brisbane, Australia
- Location: Australia
- Region served: Australia
- Official language: English
- President: Dr Rod Martin BSc, MBBS, JCCA, DRANZCOG (Adv), FACRRM, MAICD
- Website: https://www.acrrm.org.au/

The Australian College of Rural and Remote Medicine (ACRRM) is one of the two Australian Medical Council (AMC) accredited general practice colleges in Australia. The college sets and upholds standards for best practice provision of rural and remote medical care. It provides training and certification, and professional development for rural general practice. It also provides advocacy and support for current and prospective rural doctors.

The college has been part of an international movement to promote the concept of Rural Generalist Medicine as an important model of medical practice to support quality health services in rural and remote communities. The college is a signatory to the Cairns Consensus Statement of Rural Generalist Medicine endorsed by 23 national and international medical organisations. ACRRM has a current national membership of around 4,500 including fellows, registrars, practitioners, junior doctors and students.

== Training for ACRRM Fellowship ==
The college provides training and assessment pathways to the award of Fellowship of ACRRM (FACRRM) to qualify as a Specialist Rural Generalist Physician. In all pathways, training is based on the ACRRM curricula and standards, and trainees must successfully complete the ACRRM assessment, education and training program which is delivered by the college.

The formative assessments include:

- Supervisor reports: performance appraisals and feedback at least every 6 months by supervisors
- Mini-case evaluations: supervisor observes and provides feedback on at least 9 patient consultations

The summative assessments include:

- Procedural logbook: competency of essential procedural skills in anaesthetics, emergency, paediatrics, dermatology, surgery, obstetrics and gynaecology
- Multi-source feedback: review of at least 20 reports from co-workers; including doctors, nurses, allied health and administrative staff
- Multiple-choice examination: written examination of 125 multiple-choice questions to be completed within 3 hours
- Case-based discussion: selection of 12 cases from clinical practice to discuss with an examiner in a viva voce format
- Standards-based measurement of proficiency examination: simulated multi-station clinical examination of 8 scenarios

The education includes:

- Teaching: participation and attendance at tutorials and lectures throughout the year
- Workshops: enrolment into courses to develop rural obestric, emergency and anaesthetic skills
- Self-directed learning: study and perusal of online learning materials made available through the college

The training includes:

- Core Generalist Training: 12 months rural practice, 6 months of primary care, 3 months of secondary care, 3 months of emergency care, 10 weeks of paediatrics, 10 weeks of obstetrics, 10 weeks of anaesthetics
- Advanced Specialised Training: 12 months in a special skills area; including, but not limited to, emergency, anaesthetics, obsestrics, surgery, remote practice, academia, public health, indigenous health

== Professional Development Program ==
ACRRM's Professional Development Program provides a framework for undertaking continuing professional development and maintenance of professional standards for unsupervised general practice in accordance with national regulatory authorities. The program is Australian Medical Council (AMC) accredited and designed to accommodate the distinct professional requirements of general practice in the rural and remote context. In particular it requires maintenance of advanced emergency care skills.

== History ==
ACRRM was incorporated in March 1997 with 600 members.

In 1998 the college published the first edition of its ACRRM Primary Curriculum. As of 2016 the curriculum is in its 4th edition.

In 2002 the college's Professional Development Program (PDP) was formally recognized by the federal government as a mechanism for maintenance of Vocational Recognition (VR) for general practitioners in Australia.

ACRRM received initial accreditation from the Australian Medical Council (AMC) in February 2007, and was included in the Australian Medicare legislation in April 2007. Full accreditation was achieved in October 2011. The college's AMC accreditation status has been upheld since that time.

== Status and recognition within Australian regulatory framework ==
=== College Fellowship status within Legislation and Regulations governing Medicare ===
Ratified Fellows of the ACRRM can attain vocational recognition as a general practitioner. This means that they can be recognised as a specialist general practitioner in Australia and through this can become eligible to deliver services that attract a Medicare rebate.

This eligibility was achieved in 2007 through a change to the Health Insurance Regulations (1975), gazetted underneath the Health Insurance Act (1973). These two documents define the conditions for vocational recognition of General Practitioners and provide three pathways to attaining this:

1. Section 3EA of The Health Insurance Act 1973 allows doctors to gain a 'determination' as a General Practitioner if they are General Practitioners if they are Fellows of the Royal Australian College of General Practitioners.
2. Section 3F of The Health Insurance act 1973 allows doctors to gain a determination as a General Practitioner if they meet the requirements set out by Medicare Australia. This is the Vocational Register. This list is held by the CEO of Medicare Australia.
3. The third pathway relevant to Fellows of ACRRM is held in Section 6DA of The Health Insurance Regulations 1975. This section allows doctors to seek a determination that they are a General Practitioner if they 'meet ACRRM fellowship standards'. This regulation was added in April 2007 by the authority of the Governor General.

=== Accreditation by the Australian Medical Council ===
The college initially sought recognition of Rural and Remote Medicine as a unique medical specialty in Australia through the then newly established Australian Medical Council (AMC) new specialty assessment process.

This application was hotly debated with the AMC receiving 326 submissions for its deliberations. The application met resistance from some of the established medical groups and was rejected by the then Minister for Health and Ageing, Hon Tony Abbott MP and the AMC Review Group proposed an alternative way forward for the process. They considered that "applying a broad definition of general practice, the practice of rural and remote medicine is largely general practice." Additional comments said that "there is as yet no other instance in Australia of two organisations defining the standards of medical practice and the standards for training and assessment in one medical specialty...the AMC had agreed this should be possible."

In light of these comments, on 22 December 2005 Minister Abbott released funding to the Australian College of Rural and Remote Medicine to further develop its rural doctor vocational training programs for assessment and accreditation within the specialty of 'general practice'.

The college and its educational programs were subsequently assessed by the AMC and ACRRM and was granted initial accreditation as a standards body and provider of specific training and professional development program for the specialty of general practice in 2007. This decision included accreditation of training leading to Fellowship of ACRRM and of the ACRRM Professional Development Program. The AMC awarded the College Full accreditation as a provider of specialist medical training in general practice in 2011. Full accreditation status has been maintained since that time.

ACRRM became the first Australian medical college to be recognized, fully assessed and accredited under the newly established and substantively more rigorous AMC accreditation framework. Currently it continues to seek recognition with the AMC to be recognised as a sub-speciality within general practice, known as rural generalism.
