= Maria Nugent (historian) =

Historian

Maria Nugent is an Australian historian, academic and author. She is a Professor at the Australian Centre for Indigenous History, School of History, Australian National University (ANU). She has also been the Head of School since 1 July 2024. Her areas of interest include cross-cultural history and encounters in Australia, indigenous Australian history and memory studies, and material history and museum collections. She’s best known for researching and interpreting historical collections in possession of public museums and libraries, including the British Museum, the National Museum of Australia, Museum Victoria and the State Library of New South Wales (NSW).

Nugent’s body of work is informed by her 25-year-long involvement with the aboriginal community in La Perouse, NSW.

== Studies ==
Nugent completed her under graduation from the Australian National University (ANU), and received a Master’s degree from University of Sydney. She also has a graduate diploma in Adult Education from the University of Technology, Sydney (UTS), where she completed her PhD thesis in 2000.

== Career ==
Nugent joined ANU in 2009 as a research fellow in the Australian Centre for Indigenous History. She served as the centre's co-director from 2018 to 2023. In 2024 she was appointed the head of the School of History at ANU. Previously, in 2015-16, she was a visiting professor of Australian studies at University of Tokyo.

== Research ==
Nugent's research engages with Aboriginal history, memory, heritage, material history and museum collections, and cross-cultural history and encounters. She was granted the ARC Future Fellowship (2011-2015). She was part of the research project, Ancestors, artefacts, empire – mobilising Aboriginal objects, funded by the Australian Research Council (2011–2023) along with Gaye Sculthorpe, Howard Morphy, and Lissant Bolton.

== Books ==
- 2005. Botany Bay: Where Histories Meet. Allen & Unwin.
- 2009. Captain Cook was here. Cambridge University Press.

=== Edited books ===
- 2016. eds. Sarah Carter and Maria Nugent. Mistress of everything: Queen Victoria in Indigenous worlds. Manchester University Press.
- 2016. eds. Tiffany Shellam, Maria Nugent, Shino Konishi, and Allison Cadzow. Brokers and boundaries: Colonial exploration in indigenous territory. ANU Press.
- 2021. eds. Gaye Sculthorpe, Maria Nugent, Howard Morphy. Ancestors, artefacts, empire: indigenous Australia in British and Irish museums. British Museum Press.

== Awards and institutional recognition ==
- 2004: Allan Martin Award for Botany Bay: Where Histories Meet.
- 2011–2017: Recipient of the Australian Research Council Future Fellowship; awarded $579,500 for interpreting Aboriginal historical narratives and developing models to tell new Australian histories.
- 2018: Patricia Grimshaw Prize instituted by the board of Australian Historical Studies for her article A Shield Loaded with History: Encounters, Objects and Exhibitions.
