= ANU College of Health & Medicine =

- Former names: ANU College of Medicine and Health Sciences and ANU College of Medicine, Biology and Environment
- Type: Public university college; research university; medical school
- Active: 2017–2025
- Parent institution: Australian National University
- Academic affiliations: ANU Medical School; John Curtin School of Medical Research; ANU College of Science
- Dean: Professor Ross Hannan (Acting Dean)
- Location: Canberra, Australian Capital Territory, Australia
- Website: health.anu.edu.au

The ANU College of Health & Medicine was an Australian university college for the study of medicine, psychology, mental health, epidemiology and population health at the Australian National University (ANU), located in Canberra, the capital city of Australia from 2017 to its disestablishment in 2025, when the underlying schools were merged with the ANU College of Science and Medicine.

The College includes both undergraduate teaching departments and several research schools, with a focus upon different areas of the medical and health sciences. The College includes the John Curtin School of Medical Research, ANU Medical School, National Centre for Epidemiology and Population Health, and Research School of Psychology.

== History ==
The College forebears were grounded in 1946 when the ANU was established by an Act of Federal Parliament, with medicine being one of the four founding research institutes. Through the influence of Howard Florey, in 1952 laboratories for the Research School of Physical Sciences were opened; and during the 1960s the Research School of Biology was established. By 1967, the University established the Research School of Chemistry and the Research School of Biological Sciences; and several years later, the Research School of Earth Sciences was created, separated from the Research School of Physical Science; and the Centre for Resources and Environmental Studies was established by Professor Frank Fenner. Formerly the ANU College of Medicine and Health Sciences, following independent reviews of the ANU disciplines of Chemistry and biosciences, the College of Medicine, Biology and Environment was formed in August 2008.

In 2017 the College of Health & Medicine was established to incorporate the John Curtin School of Medical Research, ANU Medical School, Research School of Population Health and Research School of Psychology. However, in October 2024 the College of Health & Medicine was flagged for dis-establishment as a part of the Renew ANU reform program, due to overarching university-wide funding cuts, in spite of the College's consistent high performance and upcoming plans to build a new national health precinct. In the month prior to the Renew ANU announcement, the Dean of the College Professor Russell Gruen stepped down from his position after six years in the role, with Professor Ross Hannan stepping-in as interim Acting Dean. The John Curtin School of Medical Research and the School of Medicine and Psychology were flagged to merge with the ANU College of Science, to be re-branded as the ANU College of Science & Medicine.

== Academic courses ==
The College offers undergraduate, post-graduate and honours academic courses and research degrees. Course offerings include the MChD (Latin: Medicinae ac Chirurgiae Doctoranda) program through the ANU Medical School, studies in biotechnology, genetics, health science, medical science, psychology, and science; and the only Bachelor of Philosophy (PhB) program in Australia.

== Research ==
The College's academic research themes include ageing, applied epidemiology, biochemistry, biomedical science, biotechnology, the brain and the thinking mind, cancer, chemistry, chronic illness management, emotions, forensic psychology, genetics, genomics, health policy, human behaviour, human resources and organisational performance, immunology, infectious diseases, understanding and treating mental health, neuroscience, obesity and metabolic disorders, perception, public health data, social cohesion, and more.

== The Nixon review ==
In September 2024, ANU executives commissioned an external review into the culture of the College of Health & Medicine following multiple reports of harm from both students and staff. Former Chief commissioner of Victoria Police Christine Nixon was brought in to lead the review, and it was subsequently referred to as the "Nixon Review" by the ANU community and in ANU official reporting. The review was conducted over eight months and the publicly released findings included eight key findings related to the culture and organisational structure of the college which had contributed to a widespread atmosphere of workplace harassment and unsafe working conditions.

=== Key findings from the Nixon Review: ===
1. Lack of proper accountability systems ensures strategic plans, strategies and other reforms are implemented poorly or not at all, and there is little or no consequence for this behaviour.
2. A poor and disrespectful culture exists and has existed for many years.
3. A lack of focus on managerial skills development has meant leaders and managers are ill-prepared for their responsibilities to manage budgets, staff and culture.
4. Gender bias, sexism and racial discrimination are prevalent, and no effective steps have been taken to address these failures.
5. Poorly designed systems of work – tenure, teaching, research and service - contribute to exploitation, discrimination and bullying.
6. Appointment and selection systems lack integrity and fair process and facilitate bias, nepotism and abuse.
7. Harassment and bullying of both staff and students are widespread practices and must be eliminated. There appears to be little or no consequences for these behaviours.
8. An ineffective complaints management system means that staff and students do not report bad behaviour or feel that nothing happens when they do.

The report also made 17 recommendations the University could undertake in order to improve the college's workplace culture and create a safer work and study environment for staff and students.

=== Recommendations from the Nixon Review: ===
1. Accountability systems should clearly identify who is responsible for the success of performance measures and there should be consequences for success or failure in achieving them.
2. Ensure accountability by having an external reviewer monitor progress on these recommendations at 9 and 18 months and provide a report to Council and the University community on actions taken, structural issues addressed, and accountability measures enforced.
3. The University acknowledges that it has not always adequately responded when harm has been caused and commits to responding more appropriately.
4. Reconsider how support is provided to Aboriginal and Torres Strait Islander students, particularly where study loads or hours complicate access to support through the Tjabal Centre.
5. Provide additional support to international students, particularly HDR students.
6. Introduce an integrated program of targeted skills development that equips academic and professional staff to successfully manage staff, culture and budgets.
7. Review academic performance measurement to ensure unbiased assessment and compliance with ANU policies and procedures and relevant laws.
8. Create a single accountability mechanism for strategic oversight of interconnected equity and wellbeing challenges.
9. Make structural adjustments to help prevent bias.
10. Service commitments and administrative support should be allocated fairly and transparently.
11. Increase satisfaction with academic supervision by improving supervision panels and practices.
12. Require and enforce compliance with fair recruitment practices.
13. Increase transparency and accountability of performance on key IDEA objectives and build a strong culture of accepting and acting on results.
14. Adopt a whole-of-organisation approach to community safety.
15. Adopt a co-ordinated case management approach to disclosures and complaints which delivers actionable institutional intelligence.
16. Improve transparency and consistency of complaint investigations and outcomes.
17. Consider re-establishing Psychology as an independent research school within the College of Science.

== See also ==
- Medical education in Australia
- Higher education in Australia
