= ANU College of Science and Medicine =

College of the Australian National University

Coordinates: 35.281°S 149.119°E

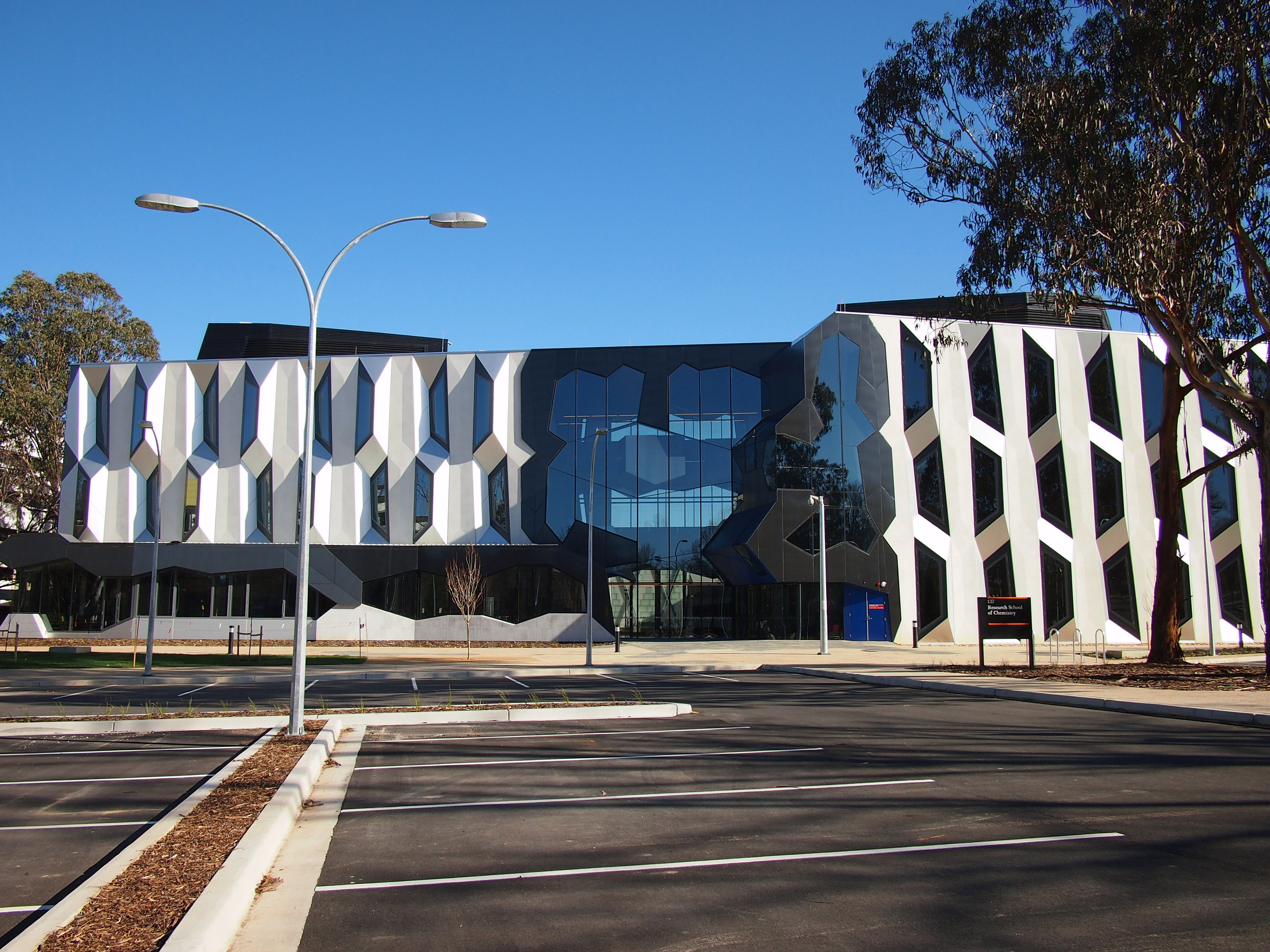
- The east face of the Research School of Chemistry building at the Australian National University shortly after it was completed.
- Type: Public university college; research university
- Established: 2017 (formerly ANU College of Physical and Mathematical Sciences and later ANU College of Science)
- Parent institution: Australian National University
- Affiliations: ANU Research School of Physics, Australian National Centre for the Public Awareness of Science, ANU College of Health & Medicine
- Dean: Professor Kiaran Kirk
- Location: Canberra, Australian Capital Territory, Australia
- Campus: Urban
- Website: science.anu.edu.au

The ANU College of Science and Medicine is a college of the Australian National University (ANU) that delivers research and teaching in physical, life, mathematical, and environmental sciences, as well as science communication. The College is composed of the Research Schools of Astronomy & Astrophysics, Biology, Chemistry, Earth Sciences, and Physics; Fenner School of Environment and Society; Mathematical Sciences Institute; and Australian National Centre for the Public Awareness of Science.

ANU's Colleges count six Nobel laureates including the current Vice Chancellor, Professor Brian Schmidt who jointly won the 2011 Nobel Prize in Physics. The College also boasts other prominent academics such as Graham Farquhar who is the first Australian to win a Kyoto Prize in Basic Sciences for his life's work in plant biophysics and photosynthesis, which has involved research on water-efficient crops and the impacts of climate change.

== Academic courses ==
The College offers undergraduate, post-graduate and honours academic courses and research degrees in the areas of astronomy, astrophysics, biology, biotechnology, chemistry, earth and marine sciences, environment and sustainability studies, genetics, health science, mathematics, medical science, physics, general science, and science communication. ANU also offers an Honours Bachelor of Philosophy (PhB) program.

== Degrees within the Joint Colleges of Science ==
Prior to 2017-2018, the College of Science and College of Health & Medicine were grouped together as the Joint Colleges of Science, under the banner of Science, Health and Medicine. The below listing is preserved because as of 2023, the Colleges frequently list programs from both Colleges on their respective websites and the ANU program catalogue continues to list degrees using this shared categorisation.

== See also ==
- Higher education in Australia
