= Australian Medical Council =

The Australian Medical Council (AMC) is an independent national standards and assessment body for medical education and training. It was established in 1985.

== Purpose ==
The purpose of the AMC is:

"To ensure that standards of education, training and assessment of the medical profession promote and protect the health of the Australian community."

== Functions ==
The AMC's major functions include:

- accrediting medical education and training providers and their programs
- developing standards, policies and procedures for the accreditation of medical programs and for the assessment of international medical graduates seeking registration in Australia
- assessing the knowledge, clinical skills and professional attributes of overseas qualified medical practitioners seeking registration in medicine under the Health Practitioner Regulation National Law
- assessing the case for recognition of medical specialties
- giving advice and making recommendations to federal, state and territory governments and agencies, including medical regulatory authorities, in relation to
  - accreditation and accreditation standards for the medical profession
  - the registration of medical practitioners
  - the assessment and recognition of overseas qualifications of medical practitioners
  - the recognition of medical specialties.

== Certification ==
AMC certification is required for international medical graduates (IMGs) who wish to be licensed in Australia. To achieve AMC certification, an IMG must pass the AMC MCQ Exam and the AMC Clinical exam, as well as having the medical diploma verified.

- The AMC MCQ exam consists of 150 multiple choice questions (MCQs) organized through computer adaptive scoring. It is delivered in one 3.5 hour session. The pass mark is set to match the level of knowledge required by Australian medical schools for their final-year graduates.
- The AMC clinical exam consists of 16 stations. At each station the candidate has two minutes to read a presentation of a case and what tasks the candidate is expected to perform. Each station usually has three or four tasks. A task may include taking a focused medical history, performing a focused physical examination, suggesting differential diagnoses or further diagnostic procedures, or informing about treatments. A candidate then has eight minutes to perform the tasks, and is required to pass 12 out of 16 cases including one compulsory case in each of gynecology and pediatrics.

== See also ==
- List of medical schools in Australia
- Australian Health Practitioner Regulation Agency
