= ANU College of Systems and Society =

- Type: Public
- Established: 1981 as the Department of Systems Engineering
- Administrative staff: around 250, including general staff
- Students: 1,200
- Location: Canberra, Australian Capital Territory, Australia
- Website: ANU College of Systems and Society

The ANU College of Systems and Society is a constituent body of the Australian National University, comprising the Australian National Centre for the Public Awareness of Science, Fenner School of Environment & Society, Mathematical Sciences Institute, School of Computing, School of Engineering, and School of Cybernetics.

== History ==
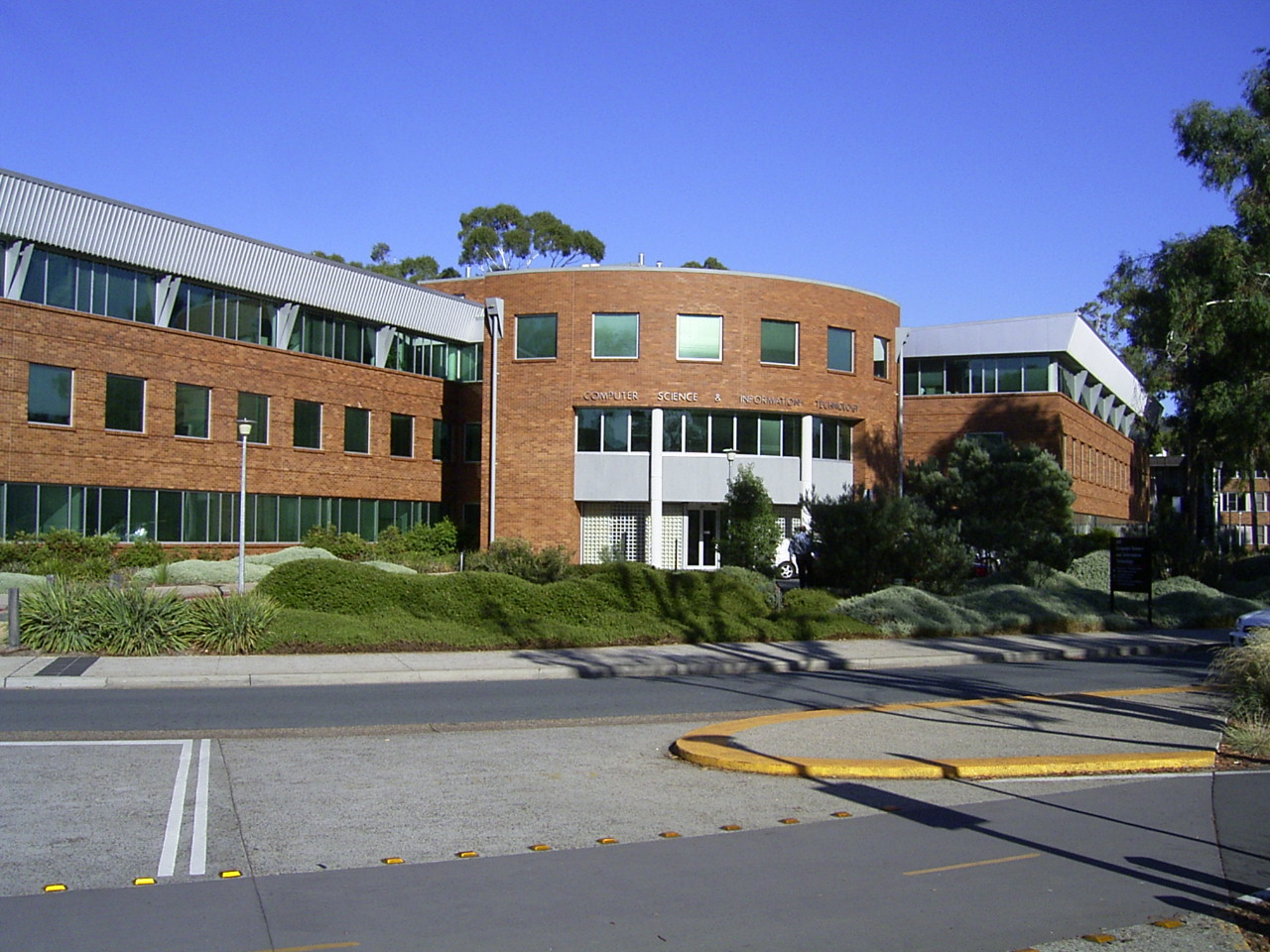
The ANU Computer Science & Information Technology Building, which houses part of the college

The Research School of Information Sciences and Engineering (RSISE) was established on 1 January 1994. RSISE resulted from the merger of the Department of Systems Engineering (1981) and the Computer Sciences Laboratory (1988), both of which were part of the Research School of Physical Sciences and Engineering (RSPhysSE). The Faculty of Engineering and Information Technology (FEIT) was established in 1993, and the Research School joined in 2004 to form a single institute that would become ANU College of Engineering and Computer Science (CECS) on 1 January 2006. In October 2022, the college was renamed to ANU College of Engineering, Computing and Cybernetics. In 2025, the college became the College of Systems & Society (CSS) realigning with three other ANU academic units: Australian National Centre for the Public Awareness of Science, Fenner School of Environment & Society, and Mathematical Sciences Institute.

== Student life ==
The ANU Computer Science Students Association (ANU CSSA) caters to the needs of IT, Computer Science and Software Engineering (CSIT) students. The organisation had existed since at least 1995, and was relaunched in 2011 and was allocated with a common room located in the Computer Science & Information Technology Building at ANU.

The ANU Engineering Students Association (ANU ESA) caters to the needs of Engineering students.
