= Inspiring Australia =

Australian government strategy for engagement with the sciences

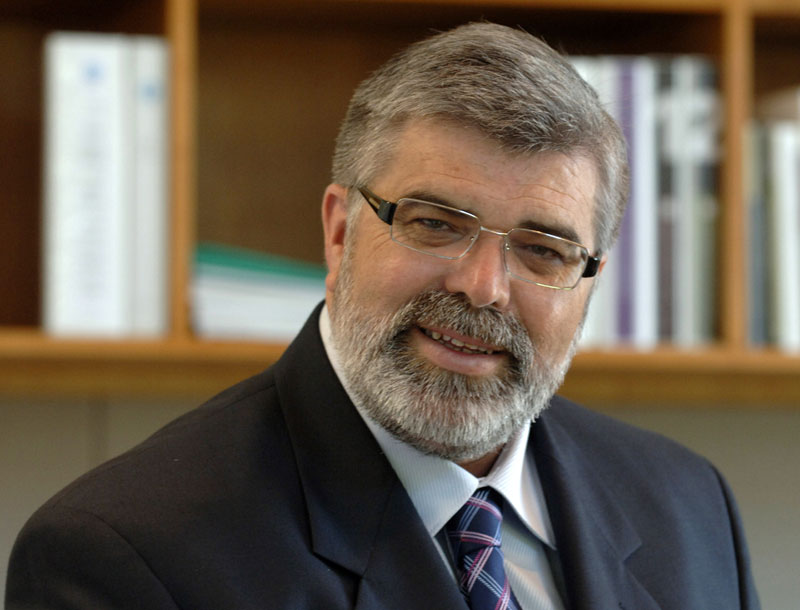
Senator Kim Carr

Inspiring Australia is an Australian national strategy for engagement with the sciences. Its goals include improving science communication and helping engage the Australian community with science. Inspiring Australia has rolled out a range of programs and expanded existing ones to help achieve its goals, including publishing reports from expert working groups, a Science Engagement Toolkit, Prime Minister's Prizes for Science and National Science Week.

A similar initiative in the UK is the British Council, which runs science projects to communicate messages around exciting or topical scientific issues, focusing on science and sustainability.

== History ==
In February 2010, Senator Kim Carr, the then Minister for Innovation, Industry, Science and Research launched the Inspiring Australia report at the Australian Science Communicators conference at the Australian National University in Canberra. The report detailed 14 recommendations to fulfill four overarching principles.

The Australian and state and territory governments agreed a shared Framework of Principles for Science Communication Initiatives.

Inspiring Australia was included in the Australian Labor Party's Science for Australia's Future policy for the August 2010 federal election. During the campaign the Coalition also committed to funding the new initiative.

In May 2011, Minister Carr announced that "Australians will be encouraged to study and excel in science and research through a new Inspiring Australia program in the 2011-12 Budget." The launch promised Inspiring Australia would coordinate the efforts of Australia’s research agencies, media outlets, universities, academies, professional bodies, the business sector, state-based science centres, museums, and community-based organisations. According to the departmental media release, the three-year $21 million Inspiring Australia program was designed to "help bring science to every Australian, regardless of geography, ethnicity, age or social condition".

In 2012, the new Minister for Science and Research, Senator Chris Evans, announced $5 million in grants for Inspiring Australia projects across the country.

At Science Meets Parliament in September 2012, Shadow Minister for Science Sophie Mirabella referred to the Inspiring Australia program as a bipartisan initiative.

In May 2013, Science In Public, a science communication agency based in Melbourne, Australia, created a web site for Inspiring Australia, featuring "stories and ideas from Australia's science community, plus events and prize opportunities from around the country". London-based ScienceRewired announced it was leading the Inspiring Australia funded development of a community component for the web site, to connect over 300 science professionals across Australia in conjunction with Australian Science Communicators and the Australian National Centre for Public Awareness of Science.

In June 2013, the Inspiring Australia funded BIG Science Communication Summit was held at the University of New South Wales in Sydney. The summit brought together more than 200 science communicators, policy makers and others for two days. The summit was a follow-up to the March 2011 Inspiring Australia Summit held in Melbourne.

In August 2013, in the lead up to the federal election, the Australian Academy of Science published an "Election Policy", urging "the next Australian Government" to treat the Academy's proposals as "national priorities", and recommending "strengthening the Inspiring Australia National Science Communication Strategy".

== Media reaction ==
Already in the business of science communication for five years when Kim Carr launched Inspiring Australia, the independent, not-for-profit Australian Science Media Centre noted the Inspiring Australia report and strategy followed a similar report in the UK in 2008, A Vision for Science and Society, developed by the UK Department for Innovation, Universities and Skills, now the Department for Business Innovation and Skills.

The Australian Science Media Centre gathered together expert reaction to the launch of the report and strategy. In their editorial overview, the Centre explained the Inspiring Australia report set out why effective communication of science was important for Australia.

Professor Graham Durant, Director of Questacon in Canberra, a lead author of the report, said the consultation around the strategy had found "many excellent science communication initiatives from a vibrant and talented mix of participants across the country", suggesting Inspiring Australia would help coordinate these activities.

Wilson da Silva, then Editor-in-Chief of COSMOS magazine and former president of the World Federation of Science Journalists argued science communication was an important and necessary component of science funding, and welcomed the report's key findings.

Dr Cathy Foley, physicist and President of the Federation of Australian Scientific and Technological Societies, said Inspiring Australia would unite the sector.

Associate Professor Sue Stocklmayer, Director of the Centre for the Public Awareness of Science at Australian National University, said while Inspiring Australia provided "an agenda for sharing best practice, more focused outreach, and serious research into communication strategies", this rhetoric needed to be appropriately resourced. She noted Australia’s national research priorities did not include science communication and urged the Government to add this to their list.

Professor Rob Morrison, science communicator and past presenter of The Curiosity Show, called for more efforts helping people understand how science "works" to avoid confusions and misunderstandings over issues like "climate change, stem cell research, inoculation programs, GM technology, the importance of peer-review and so on". Morrison called for more publishing in the popular realm including "field guides, text books, case studies and popular science books".

Dr Susannah Eliott, CEO of the Australian Science Media Centre, welcomed the report and strategy, hoping it would change the culture which had led to much science communication becoming "focussed on profile raising rather than the public’s need to know". She also argued the report's assertion stating "general mainstream media is not interested in science" did not appear evidence-based and did not tally with the experience of the Science Media Centre.

== Expert Working Group reports ==
Inspiring Australia initiated Expert Working Groups have delivered reports on science engagement issues relating to:

- Science in the media
- Developing an evidence base
- Marine science
- Tropical Australia
- Desert regions
- Indigenous Australians

In June 2013, the Council for Humanities and Social Sciences released an Inspiring Australia funded report on industry and science engagement.

== Funded projects ==
Inspiring Australia have funded a range of projects related to improving science engagement in Australia. Such projects include:

- Science Media Space social media workshops for scientists
- SciJourno science journalism course
- Scimex science media exchange
- Unlocking Australia's Potential grant round projects
- Science Engage audit of science engagement activity
