= Y? =

Australian educational children's television show

- Genre: Children's education
- Directed by: Leo Flynn
- Presented by: Joanne Nova (season 1); David Lampard (seasons 2-5); Tara Colegrave (seasons 2-5)
- Country of origin: Australia
- Original language: English
- No. of seasons: 5
- No. of episodes: 325

Production
- Producer: Bob Gillow
- Running time: 22 minutes
- Production companies: Southern Star (1999-2000); Southern Star Endemol (2001-2002)

Original release
- Network: Nine Network
- Release: 1 November 1999 – 2002

Y? was an educational children's science program shown on the Nine Network in Australia. It was produced by Southern Star Endemol between 1999 and 2002. Each episode ran for 22 minutes. A total of five seasons were recorded. Each season was 65 episodes long.

Season 1 was hosted by Joanne Nova with Alanna Edwards and seasons 2 to 5 were hosted by Tara Colegrave and 'science host' David Lampard. The show featured in-studio science experiments. In season 1 these were presented by Nova but in later seasons these were presented by Lampard (and occasionally by Colegrave). The program was interspersed with external segments where other presenters go to forests, factories, etc. and explain practical science phenomena, usually based upon questions sent in by viewers.

The presenters included Brad Hills, Kristy Mollica, Joseph May, Lisa Barry and Taryn Onafaro.

The show was in many ways similar to The Curiosity Show, which ran many years earlier. However, the hosts of Y? were charismatic younger adults, compared with the older academic Prof. Rob Morrison and Dr. Deane Hutton who hosted the earlier counterpart, making Y? inherently more appealing to children.

Y? did not labour to "dumb down" the science content of its experiments and explanations, aiming its explanations at a late-primary school audience with above average intelligence. It endeavoured to respond to questions sent in by children, such as "How do radio stations broadcast to all our radios in our cars or in our houses?" and "Where do flies go at night?"
