= 3-2-1 Contact =

American educational children's TV program

- Original opening title of 3-2-1 Contact
- Created by: Samuel Y. Gibbon Jr.
- Starring: Varied, see article
- Theme music composer: Tom Anthony
- Country of origin: United States
- No. of seasons: 7
- No. of episodes: 225 (and 10 specials)

Production
- Running time: 30 minutes
- Production company: Children's Television Workshop

Original release
- Network: PBS
- Release: January 14, 1980 – November 18, 1988

3-2-1 Contact is an American science educational television show produced by the Children's Television Workshop (CTW, now known as Sesame Workshop). It aired on PBS from 1980 to 1988 and later ran on Noggin (a joint venture between the CTW and Nickelodeon) from 1999 to 2003. The show teaches scientific principles and their applications. Edward G. Atkins, who was responsible for much of the scientific content of the show, felt that the TV program would not replace a classroom but would encourage viewers to ask questions about the scientific purpose of things.

== History ==
=== Initial conception ===
3-2-1 Contact was the brainchild of Samuel Y. Gibbon Jr., who had been the executive producer of the original The Electric Company for the CTW from 1971 to 1977. (Gibbon had left the CTW before Contact's production officially began, though he was still credited as "Senior Consultant".) The show was based on the original concept of The Curiosity Show, an Australian science-based children's educational TV show that had been running since 1972. That program was hosted by Australian scientists Rob Morrison and Deane Hutton, who were consultants to The Children's Television Workshop in the early planning stages of what became 3-2-1 Contact. CTW wanted to make a version using American scientists as presenters, but PBS did not think that middle-aged scientists would engage a young audience (despite the popularity of the format in Australia) and insisted that any science show be hosted/presented by young people. CTW eventually reworked the concept into 3-2-1 Contact.

=== Seasons production ===
The first season of 65 programs began airing January 14, 1980, on selected PBS member stations; it featured a cast of three college students who socialized and discussed science in an on-campus room known as "the workshop". The show also used brief segments at the beginning of the show featuring a celebrity and/or famous character making a brief scientific statement. Some of the celebrities and/or characters who appeared were Robert Guillaume for "Food/Fuel" week; Sarah Jessica Parker, then performing in the Broadway musical Annie for "Hot/Cold" week; cast members of Eight is Enough for "Crowded/Uncrowded" week; Donny Most and Ron Palillo for "Fast/Slow" week; Billy Barty and Carl Weathers for "Big/Small" week; Tim O'Connor and Felix Silla (and the voice of by Mel Blanc) from Buck Rogers in the 25th Century for "Near/Far" week; Gene Wilder for "Communication" week, Arte Johnson, reprising a character from Rowan and Martin's Laugh-In for "Growth/Decay" week; Sha Na Na members Jon 'Bowzer' Bauman and Screamin' Scott Simon for "Noisy/Quiet" week; Rita Moreno (who was part of The Electric Company cast for its entire run) for "Forces" week; the Harlem Globetrotters' Meadowlark Lemon and the cast of The White Shadow for "Order/Disorder" week; and Larry Wilcox of CHiPs for "Surfaces" week. The segment ended with a brief visual film similar to the Scanimate animations used on The Electric Company showcasing the big words of the week and their role in science. This season came to an end on April 11, 1980, and continued in reruns (or removed entirely from scheduling on some stations) for the following three years, as funding for additional episodes was not yet sufficient.

When production finally resumed for the second season, which premiered on October 17, 1983, the show presented a more realistic appearance, as the new cast convened in a suburban basement (these segments were shot at Reeves Teletape, which also housed Sesame Street at the time). The celebrity segments were discontinued and the science topic was introduced by a computer cursor which typed out the week's topic and subtopic of the day, replacing the visual films used in the first season. This cast continued until October 18, 1985. Ozzie Alfonso was Contact's new director and Al Hyslop its executive producer.

When the fifth season began on September 22, 1986, a third cast was introduced. However, unlike the previous casts, they did not meet in any specific setting; instead, they appeared in various taped and filmed segments. The show ended after seven seasons and 225 episodes on November 18, 1988, with reruns airing until September 27, 1992. Reruns resumed the next year on commercial television, with All American Television handling syndication.

A frequent segment of the show was The Bloodhound Gang, a series about a group of young detectives who used science to solve crimes.

=== International and school versions ===
For a time in the mid-1980s, the program was co-produced with the French television network FR3 and featured several new French cast members in addition to the American cast. From 1982 to 1983 the program was aired in Spain with dubbed-over versions of the American original broadcasts, and some local add-ons with four Spanish cast members: Sonia Martínez, Luis Bollain, Fernando Rueda, and Marifé Rodríguez. Another Spanish version of the broadcast was aired from 1990 to 1992.

It was reported in 1984 that 3-2-1 Contact had an audience of over 7 million viewers and was broadcast in 26 countries including West Germany, France, Italy, and Spain making their own dubbed-over versions.

From September 1, 1991, to May 1, 1992, an edited version titled 3-2-1 Classroom Contact was produced, specifically for in-school viewing. It was hosted by either Stephanie Yu, Z. Wright, or both and used previously aired segments from the past series.

Broadcasters wanted children and schools to record and replay the episodes without being afraid of infringement of copyright violations.

== Hosts ==
- Liz Moses as Lisa (1980)
- Nathan Cook (1980)
- Leon W. Grant as Mark (1980)
- Ginny Ortiz as Trini (1980)
- Marcelino Sánchez as Ricardo (1980)
- Liz Gorcey as Jackie (field segments, 1983)
- Kelly Pino as Kathy (1983–85)
- Frank Gomez as Miguel (1983–86)
- Benjamin H. Carlin as Paco (1983–86)
- Judy Leak as Robin (1983–86)
- Manny Mendiola as Diego (1985–86)
- Tannis Vallely as Mary (1985–86)
- Candida Romero as Monique (1986)
- Abigael Maryan as Chantal (1986)
- Ericka Pazcoguin as Maggie (1986–87)

And as themselves:

- Mary Lopez (1986)
- David Drach (1986–87)
- David Quinn (1986–88)
- Debra Allison Shapiro (1986–88)
- Todd A. Rolle (1986–88)
- Hopey Fitzpatrick (1987–88)
- Stephanie Yu (1987–88)
- Z. Wright (1987–88)
- Dennis Weaver (1987–88)

== Episodes ==
Extended content

=== Season 1 (1980) ===
- Noisy/Quiet: Production & Processing of Sound (January 14, 1980)
- Noisy/Quiet: The Ear (January 15, 1980)
- Noisy/Quiet: How People & Animals Use Sound (January 16, 1980)
- Noisy/Quiet: Music (January 17, 1980)
- Noisy/Quiet: Range of Vibrations (January 18, 1980)
- Hot/Cold: People's Temperatures (January 21, 1980)
- Hot/Cold: Animal and Plant Adaptations (January 22, 1980)
- Hot/Cold: How Hot or Cold Can (January 23, 1980)
- Hot/Cold: Heat and Work (January 24, 1980)
- Hot Cold: Temperatures on Earth/In Space (January 25, 1980)
- Fast/Slow: Speed Up, Slow Down (January 28, 1980)
- Fast/Slow: Rhythms of Nature (January 29, 1980)
- Fast/Slow: Lifetimes (January 30, 1980)
- Fast/Slow: Speed and Racing (January 31, 1980)
- Fast/Slow: Time and Time Again (February 1, 1980)
- Food/Fuel: Animal Food (February 4, 1980)
- Food/Fuel: Human Food (February 5, 1980)
- Food/Fuel: Growing and Processing Food (February 6, 1980)
- Food/Fuel: Fueling Machines (February 7, 1980)
- Food/Fuel: The Sun Makes Everything Go (February 8, 1980)
- Crowded/Uncrowded: Human Crowding (February 11, 1980)
- Crowded/Uncrowded: Optimum Populations in Nature (February 12, 1980)
- Crowded/Uncrowded: Contrasts in Densities of Materials (February 13, 1980)
- Crowded/Uncrowded: Liquids & Solids (February 14, 1980)
- Crowded/Uncrowded: Human Survival/Controlling Densities (February 15, 1980)
- Light/Dark: The Sun (February 18, 1980)
- Light/Dark: Adaptation of Plants/Animals (February 19, 1980)
- Light/Dark: Electromagnetic Spectrum (February 20, 1980)
- Light/Dark: The Eye (February 21, 1980)
- Light/Dark: Light Sources (February 22, 1980)
- Big/Small: Animal Sizes/Scaling (February 25, 1980)
- Big/Small: Animal Habitats (February 26, 1980)
- Big/Small: Dinosaurs (February 27, 1980)
- Big/Small: Volume & Efficiency (February 28, 1980)
- Big/Small: How Big is Big? (February 29, 1980)
- Near/Far: Seeing Isn't Always (March 3, 1980)
- Near/Far: Mapping and Navigating Near Home (March 4, 1980)
- Near/Far: Mapping and Navigating Over Earth (March 5, 1980)
- Near/Far: Space Travel (March 6, 1980)
- Near/Far: Knowing Where You Are (March 7, 1980)
- Growth/Decay: Sex and Seeds (March 10, 1980)
- Growth/Decay: Human Growth (March 11, 1980)
- Growth/Decay: Decay (March 12, 1980)
- Growth/Decay: Human Cultures/Land Forms (March 13, 1980)
- Growth/Decay: Cycles Upon Cycles (March 14, 1980)
- Communication: Human Communication (March 17, 1980)
- Communication: Animal Communication (March 18, 1980)
- Communication: Machinery of Communication (March 19, 1980)
- Communication with Other Species (March 20, 1980)
- Communication: Feedback (March 21, 1980)
- Forces and Motion (March 24, 1980)
- Forces and Fields (March 25, 1980)
- Forces: Buoyancy and Gravity (March 26, 1980)
- Forces and Machines (March 27, 1980)
- Forces: A Spectacle of Forces (March 28, 1980)
- Order/Disorder: Regular Patterns (March 31, 1980)
- Order/Disorder: The Body – An Ordered System (April 1, 1980)
- Order/Disorder: Social Order (April 2, 1980)
- Order/Disorder: Disordered (April 3, 1980)
- Order/Disorder: Sum of Its Parts (April 4, 1980)
- Surfaces: Protection (April 7, 1980)
- Surfaces: Shapes and Functions at the Surface (April 8, 1980)
- Surfaces: Surface Tension and Bubbles (April 9, 1980)
- Surfaces: Surface of the Earth (April 10, 1980)
- Surfaces: The Atmosphere—Skin of the Earth (April 11, 1980)

=== Season 2 (1983) ===
- Flight: Flying Animals (October 17, 1983)
- Flight: Air Resistance (October 18, 1983)
- Flight: Lift (October 19, 1983)
- Flight: Thrust (October 20, 1983)
- Flight: Acceleration (October 21, 1983)
- Sports: Training Analysis (October 24, 1983)
- Sports: Time, Rate, Measurement (October 25, 1983)
- Sports: Energy Transfer (October 26, 1983)
- Sports: Impact Analysis (October 27, 1983)
- Sports: Coordination (October 28, 1983)
- Survival: Breathing (October 31, 1983)
- Survival: Temperature (November 1, 1983)
- Survival: Protection (November 2, 1983)
- Survival: Energy (November 3, 1983)
- Survival: Teamwork (November 4, 1983)
- Babies: The Code of Life (November 7, 1983)
- Babies: Growth and Development (November 8, 1983)
- Babies: Behavior (November 9, 1983)
- Babies: Colonization (November 10, 1983)
- Babies: Change (November 11, 1983)
- Building: Materials (November 14, 1983)
- Building: One of a Kind (November 15, 1983)
- Building: Standard Parts (November 16, 1983)
- Building: Modular (November 17, 1983)
- Building: Communication (November 18, 1983)
- Shapes in Nature (November 21, 1983)
- Shapes and Gravity (November 22, 1983)
- Shapes: Streamlining (November 23, 1983)
- Shapes: Form and Function (November 24, 1983)
- Shapes: Clues (November 25, 1983)
- Water: 3 Phases – Gas, Liquid, Solid (November 28, 1983)
- Water: Medium for Life (November 29, 1983)
- Water and People (November 30, 1983)
- Water: Distribution (December 1, 1983)
- Water in the Body (December 2, 1983)
- Senses: Taste and Smell (December 5, 1983)
- Senses: Sight (December 6, 1983)
- Senses: Hearing (December 7, 1983)
- Senses: Touch (December 8, 1983)
- Senses: Special Sensors (December 9, 1983)

=== Season 3 (1984) ===
- Space: Weightless (October 22, 1984)
- Space: Getting There (October 23, 1984)
- Space: Living There (October 24, 1984)
- Space: Working There (October 25, 1984)
- Space: Anybody Out There? (October 26, 1984)
- Measurement: How Long? How Far? (October 29, 1984)
- Measurement: What's the Area? What's the Volume? (October 30, 1984)
- Measurement: How Many? How Much? (October 31, 1984)
- Measurement: How Heavy? How Dense? (November 1, 1984)
- Measurement: How Fast? How Slow? (November 2, 1984)
- Earth is Change (November 5, 1984)
- Earth: Maps (November 6, 1984)
- Earth: Climate (November 7, 1984)
- Earth: Flora and Fauna (November 8, 1984)
- Earth: Building Models (November 9, 1984)
- Electricity: What is It? (November 12, 1984)
- Electricity and Magnetism (November 13, 1984)
- Electricity: Where Do We Get It? (November 14, 1984)
- Electricity Runs in a Circuit (November 15, 1984)
- Electricity: You Are Electric (November 16, 1984)

=== Season 4 (1985) ===
- "Tropics: Rubber" (September 23, 1985)
- "Tropics: Metals" (September 24, 1985)
- "Tropics: Rice" (September 25, 1985)
- "Tropics: Working Animals – Monkeys and Elephants" (September 26, 1985)
- "Tropics: Endangered Animals" (September 27, 1985)
- "Light: From the Sun; To Your Eyes" (September 30, 1985)
- "Light: Color" (October 1, 1985)
- "Light: Eyes" (October 2, 1985)
- "Light: How Animals See" (October 3, 1985)
- "Light: Bending and Bouncing" (October 4, 1985)
- "Farms: Sheep and Pigs – Selective Breeding" (October 7, 1985)
- "Farms: Plants and Pigs – Plant Production" (October 8, 1985)
- "Farms: Hybrids" (October 9, 1985)
- "Farms: Cows and Pigs – Animal Products" (October 10, 1985)
- "Farms: Chickens and Pigs – Animal Production" (October 11, 1985)
- "Stuff: Metals" (October 14, 1985)
- "Stuff: Clay" (October 15, 1985)
- "Stuff: Shaping It" (October 16, 1985)
- "Stuff: Feathers and Rubber" (October 17, 1985)
- "Stuff: Using It" (October 18, 1985)

=== Season 5 (1986) ===
- "Signals: Lingo" (September 22, 1986)
- "Signals: Talking Birds, Talking Rooms" (September 23, 1986)
- "Signals: Looking for Visual Clues" (September 24, 1986)
- "Signals: Getting Them Around" (September 25, 1986)
- "Signals: Cracking Codes" (September 26, 1986)
- "Oceans: On the Sea" (September 29, 1986)
- "Oceans: In the Sea" (September 30, 1986)
- "Oceans: From the Sea" (October 1, 1986)
- "Oceans: By the Sea" (October 2, 1986)
- "Oceans: Of the Sea" (October 3, 1986)
- "Motion: What's Up?" (October 6, 1986)
- "Motion: Bones" (October 7, 1986)
- "Motion: Smashing" (October 8, 1986)
- "Motion: Getting a Grip" (October 9, 1986)
- "Motion: Heave Ho!" (October 10, 1986)
- "Eating: Tooth Detectives" (October 13, 1986)
- "Eating: Picky Eaters" (October 14, 1986)
- "Eating: Zoo Food" (October 15, 1986)
- "Eating: Down the Hatch" (October 16, 1986)
- "Eating: Leftovers" (October 17, 1986)

=== Season 6 (1987) ===
- Japan: Precious Oysters, Rare Salamanders (October 12, 1987)
- Japan: Landslide! (October 13, 1987)
- Japan: Paper and Kites (October 14, 1987)
- Japan: Earthquake! (October 15, 1987)
- Japan: Judo and Computers (October 16, 1987)
- Detectives: Skin and Bone Detectives (October 19, 1987)
- Detectives: Tool and Trash Detectives (October 20, 1987)
- Detectives: Wildlife Detectives (October 21, 1987)
- Detectives: Dinosaur Detectives (October 22, 1987)
- Detectives: Pattern Detectives (October 23, 1987)
- Architecture: Raising the Big Top (October 26, 1987)
- Architecture: Home (October 27, 1987)
- Architecture: Stack It Up (October 28, 1987)
- Architecture: Made to Fit (October 29, 1987)
- Architecture: Light But Strong (October 30, 1987)
- Mammals: Rats and Bats (November 2, 1987)
- Mammals: Keeping Warm (November 3, 1987)
- Mammals: Live Birth, Warm Milk (November 4, 1987)
- Mammals at Play (November 5, 1987)
- Big Mammals: The High Cost of Living (November 6, 1987)
- Modeling: Things on Wheels (November 9, 1987)
- Modeling: Through Ice and Air (November 10, 1987)
- Modeling: The Earth (November 11, 1987)
- Modeling: Knees and Small Things (November 12, 1987)
- Modeling: Spaces (November 13, 1987)
- In the Air: Finding Your Way (November 16, 1987)
- In the Air: Drifting with the Wind (November 17, 1987)
- In the Air: Born to Fly (November 18, 1987)
- In the Air: Fat Things That Fly (November 19, 1987)
- In the Air: Unbelievable Flying Objects (November 20, 1987)

=== Season 7 (1988) ===
- Antarctica: Getting There (October 10, 1988)
- Antarctica: Getting Around (October 11, 1988)
- Antarctica: Life On The Edge (October 12, 1988)
- Antarctica: Life Under The Ice (October 13, 1988)
- Antarctica: The Desert Continent (October 14, 1988)
- Your Body: Twins (October 17, 1988)
- Your Body: Having a Baby (October 18, 1988)
- Your Body: Sleep (October 19, 1988)
- Your Body: Spinning (October 20, 1988)
- Your Body: Your Health (October 21, 1988)
- Australia: Platypus & Echidna (October 24, 1988)
- Australia: Moths & Beetles (October 25, 1988)
- Australia: Emu & Kookaburra (October 26, 1988)
- Australia: Koalas (October 27, 1988)
- Australia: Kangaroos (October 28, 1988)
- Structures: Bubble, Bubble (October 31, 1988)
- Structures: Pipes and Reeds (November 1, 1988)
- Structures: Chaos and Computers (November 2, 1988)
- Structures: Running Robots (November 3, 1988)
- Structures: Suspended in Air (November 4, 1988)
- Greece: The Journey Begins (November 7, 1988)
- Greece: Under The Ash (November 8, 1988)
- Greece: Before History (November 9, 1988)
- Greece: Sheep & Cheese (November 10, 1988)
- Greece: The Parthenon (November 11, 1988)
- Island: Parrot Fish (November 14, 1988)
- Island: Lizards (November 15, 1988)
- Island: Coral (November 16, 1988)
- Island: Flamingos (November 17, 1988)
- Island: Conch (November 18, 1988)

=== 3-2-1 Contact Extra ===
- I Have AIDS: A Teenager's Story (April 8, 1989)
- The Rotten Truth (January 15, 1990)
- You Can't Grow Home Again (September 2, 1990)
- Down the Drain (January 14, 1991)
- Bottom of the Barrel (February 18, 1991)
- Secrets of the Code (August 3, 1991)
- A Popular Little Planet (April 22, 1992)
- Get Busy: How Kids Can Save the Planet (April 22, 1992)
- What Kids Want to Know...About Sex and Growing Up (May 13, 1992)
- Brainstorm: The Truth About Your Brain on Drugs (December 14, 1992)

== Magazine ==
Three months before the show premiered, a print magazine of the same name that also focused on science was released. In 1985, the magazine absorbed some of the content of sibling publication Enter (which went out of print that same year), including reader submissions of computer programs written in the BASIC computer language as well as reviews of popular computer programs. The Enter section also contained a new feature called "The Slipped Disk Show", in which a fictional disc jockey answered computer-related questions submitted by readers.

In 1987, the magazine began featuring content from another CTW production, Square One Television. Such content frequently took the form of a two-page comic strip, often parodying a popular show or movie of the time, with a math-related question at the end.

The Bloodhound Gang mysteries also made the leap to the magazine, but they were subsequently replaced with a series entitled The Time Team in September 1990. These stories found teenage characters Sean Nolan and Jenny Lopez traveling to different time periods in the past and future. Their surroundings and personal encounters were described with great detail, educating readers as to the customs of various cultures throughout history, and – on trips to the future – often pushing present day hot-button issues. For example, a 1993 story saw the duo traveling to what appeared to be a prehistoric forest, but near the end, they found a Brazil flag, a newspaper clipping from 1995, and a bulldozer at work: this was in fact a Brazilian rainforest being levelled.

In 1996, The Time Team was replaced by a comic serial, Cosmic Crew, which focused on the adventures of a group of teenagers and their robot butler in space. Their first story arc (which ran for more than a year) had them trying to figure out a series of riddles relating to places in the Solar System in order to claim a treasure (which turned out to be a scholarship fund). Another story arc had a delinquent (who had been a villain in the first arc) join them in order to chase down a gang of other delinquents. Despite being effectively replaced, a few Time Team stories were run whenever there were gaps between installments of Cosmic Crew.

Many of the magazine's cover stories involved current events, such as 1990s oil fires in the Middle East. Additionally, the magazine offered a games section in which most of the games were related to the stories in the issue.

In 1996, CTW presumably concluded that faithful readers from the late 1980s and early 1990s had long since moved on, and the magazine began to reprint non-time-sensitive stories from years past. For example, a 1991 article on the geography of the Galápagos Islands – a subject relatively unchanging due to the islands' well-enforced ecologically protected status – could very well re-appear in an identical format a half a decade later.

Under Children's Television Workshop (now known as Sesame Workshop), the magazine later became Contact Kids, removing the original reference to the television show. Production of the magazine was suspended indefinitely in 2001.
