= Joanne Nova =

Australian writer, blogger, and speaker (born 1967)

- Born: Joanne Codling; 1967 (age 58–59)
- Education: Molecular biology
- Alma mater: University of Western Australia
- Spouse: David Evans
- Website: joannenova.com.au

External image
- Joanne Nova, 2009

Joanne Nova is an Australian writer, blogger, and speaker. Born Joanne Codling, she adopted the stage name "Nova" in 1998 when she was preparing to host a children's television program. She is prominent for promoting climate change denial.

== Education ==
Nova received a Bachelor of Science degree from the University of Western Australia. Her major was microbiology, molecular biology. Nova received a Graduate Certificate in Scientific Communication from the Australian National University in 1989.

== Career ==
For four years, Nova jointly co-ordinated the Shell Questacon Science Circus, a partnership between Questacon, the Shell Oil Company Australia and the Australian National University, which operates all over Australia. Nova was an Associate Lecturer of Science Communication at Australian National University.

From November 1999 to February 2000, Nova was the host of the first series of Australian children's science television show Y? She was a regular guest on ABC Radio. She is a director of GoldNerds, a gold investment advice business.

Nova has published a book called Serious Science Party Tricks, which is aimed at children. Nova has written for The Spectator, and has had columns published on the Op-Ed pages of The Australian.

=== Climate change denial advocacy ===
She self-published The Skeptics Handbook, which rejects the scientific consensus on climate change and promotes various falsehoods about climate change. The book argues that temperatures have not increased, and that greenhouse gases do not contribute to climate change. The book promotes the myth that there is already so much CO_{2} in the atmosphere that adding more will not have an impact on temperatures. The book was widely distributed in the United States by The Heartland Institute, known primarily for promoting pseudoscientific views on climate change and the harms of smoking. In 2009, Nova self-published a sequel, Global Bullies Want Your Money, and in the same year she wrote a paper for the SPPI titled Climate Money. That year, she gave a presentation at the Heartland Institute, titled "The Great Global Fawning: How Science Journalists Pay Homage to Non-Science and Un-Reason".

She has falsely claimed that fewer than half of climate scientists agree with the IPCC's conclusion that CO_{2} is the dominant contributor to climate change. PolitiFact described that as a "flat-out wrong" interpretation of data from a survey, and the lead author of the survey in question said that the survey showed "a strong majority of scientists agree that greenhouse gases originating from human activity are the dominant cause of recent warming." Nova has argued that climate science is distorted by money, saying "thousands of scientists have been funded to find a connection between human carbon emissions and the climate. Hardly any have been funded to find the opposite."

Nova had a five-part debate on AGW with Dr. Andrew Glikson, first on Quadrant Online, and continuing on her own blog. In 2012, she appeared in the ABC Television documentary I Can Change Your Mind About ... Climate with her partner David Evans, in discussion with Nick Minchin and Anna Rose.
