= Mike Gore (physicist) =

Australian physicist (1934–2022)

Mike Gore AO
- Born: 5 September 1934; Bolton, Lancashire, England
- Died: 8 January 2022 (aged 87); Canberra, ACT, Australia
- Citizenship: Australian
- Occupation: Electrical engineer • physicist
- Awards: Officer of the Order of Australia (AO)

Academic background
- Education: Leeds University
- Thesis: The design and development of a heterodyne beat frequency apparatus and some applications in dielectric constant investigations of fibre assemblies (1961)
- Influences: Established Questacon

Academic work
- Discipline: Electrical Engineering

Michael Miles Gore AO (5 September 1934 – 8 January 2022) was a British-born Australian engineer, physicist, and science explainer, who worked at the Australian National University in Canberra. He was noted for being the founder of Questacon, the first interactive science centre in Australia.

== Early life ==
Gore was born in Bolton, Lancashire, on 5 September 1934. He was the only child of May Robinson and Ernest Gore, who worked as an electrical engineer. Gore attended Worsley Technical School for two years, before completing his secondary education at Bolton Senior Tech. He first graduated with a Bachelor of Science in electrical engineering. He subsequently undertook postgraduate studies in that field at Leeds University, obtaining a Doctor of Philosophy in the 1950s.

== Professional career ==
At the conclusion of his studies, Gore was offered a post-doctoral position at Brown University for nine months, as well as the position of lecturer in physics at the Australian National University (ANU) in Canberra. He accepted both positions after arranging a deferral of the starting date of the latter, and consequently immigrated to Australia in 1962. Gore was appointed Acting Warden of Burton Hall in 1973 and served as Warden of Garran Hall in 1974-1975

He later became a Professor, and in 1987 left the ANU and was later styled Professor Emeritus. As at early 2015, Gore was a Sessional Lecturer at the ANU, based at the Centre for the Public Awareness of Science.

=== Explaining science ===
Gore established Questacon, the national science centre, in Canberra in 1980. It was the first interactive science centre in the country. It was originally based in the recently shuttered, historic Ainslie Public School (built 1927). He was inspired to set up the centre after visiting the Exploratorium in San Francisco in 1976. Questacon moved to the permanent building on Lake Burley Griffin in 1988, after Gore left academia the year before to become the foundation director of Questacon – The National Science and Technology Centre. He retired back to academia in 1999, working as an adjunct professor in science communication.

Gore was a scientific advisor to the ABC television series "Towards 2000". He established the ANU's Centre for the Public Awareness of Science (CPAS) in 1995. In 2010, Gore was a founding member of The Faraday Club, established by Dr Howie Firth, MBE, of the Orkney International Science Festival, to recognise science communicators of international standing and named after Michael Faraday, leading English scientist of the nineteenth century.

== Personal life ==
Gore was married to Joyce Klaber. They met during his time in the United States as a post-doctoral research fellow at Brown University, where she was studying US History. They had three children.

Gore died on 8 January 2022, in Canberra. He was 87 years old.

== Honours ==
1982

- 'Canberran of the Year'
- Churchill Fellowship

1986

- Member of the Order of Australia (AM) in recognition of service to scientific education.

1992

- Eureka Prize – Gore and Questacon

2001

- Award for Outstanding Service to Physics in Australia (Australian Institute of Physics)

2006

- Academy Medal, Australian Academy of Science

2015

- Officer of the Order of Australia (AO) for distinguished service to science through a range of public outreach, communication and education initiatives on a national and international level, and as a mentor and role model for young scientists.

== Publications ==
- Gore, Michael Miles, Interactive science centres: a world wide study (1983)
- Gore, MM. Interactive Science and Technology Centres. In: National Engineering Conference (1990 : Canberra, A.C.T.). 1990 National Engineering Conference of the Institution of Engineers, Australia: Government, Engineering and the Nation; Barton, ACT: Institution of Engineers, Australia, 1990: 92-96. National conference publication (Institution of Engineers, Australia); no. 90/1
- Sue Stocklmayer, Michael M. Gore, C.R. Bryant (editors), Science Communication in Theory and Practice. Springer Science & Business Media, 31 December 2001, 284 pages. ISBN 9789401006200
