= Susan Stocklmayer =

Australian science communicator

Emeritus Professor Susan (Sue) Mary Stocklmayer, AO, is a science communicator who served as Director of the Centre for the Public Awareness of Science at the Australian National University (ANU) from 1998 to 2015.

== Early life and education ==
Born in Zambia, Stocklmayer completed her undergraduate education at the University of London with a Bachelor of Science in physics and chemistry. With her family, she migrated to Australia in 1982 and settled in Western Australia. There she attended Curtin University studying for a graduate diploma in applied science and masters of philosophy (MPhil). She was awarded a PhD in 1994, together with the Curtin University graduate medal.

== Career ==
Stocklmayer began her career as a physics teacher, before moving into science communication. On graduating with her PhD, she joined the Australian National University in 1994 as lecturer in science communication. She became Director of the Centre for the Public Awareness of Science in 1998.

She has been editor-in-chief of The International Journal of Science Education (Part B): Communication and Public Engagement since 2010. In 2011 Stocklmayer became Australia's first chair in science communication.

== Awards and recognition ==
- 2004 Australia Day Honours, named Member of the Order of Australia (AM) "for service to science and to the community through the development of programs to raise public awareness of scientific ideas and issues and by encouraging young people, particularly girls, to enter the field."
- 2010 invited to the membership of the international Faraday Club.
- 2016 Australia Day Honours, named Officer of the Order of Australia (AO) "For distinguished service to science communication and education through the development of academic outreach programs and public awareness initiatives, both nationally and internationally."

== Sue Stocklmayer Prize for Science Communication Major ==
In 2013 the Sue Stocklmayer Prize for Science Communication Major was established in recognition of Stocklmayer's career achievements. It is awarded annually to the student, Australian or international, who receives the highest aggregate mark in their major in science communication.

Winners

- 2013: Aneeta Nathan
- 2014: Caroline Faulder
- 2015: Adam Huttner-Koros
- 2016: Michaela Ripper
- 2018: Lamis Kazak
- 2019: Georgia Elliot
- 2020: Isabel Richards
- 2020: Rebeca Claire Ganon
- 2020: Andrew David Ray
- 2021: Ella Louise McCarthy
- 2022: Trinity Trantino
- 2023: Rebecca Sargent
- 2024: Arabella Young
- 2024: Jarrah Palethorpe

== Publications ==
- Stocklmayer, Susan M; Gore, Michael M; Bryant, Chris (31 December 2001). Science communication in theory and practice. Kluwer Academic (published 2001). ISBN 978-1-4020-0130-7.
- Honeyman, Brento; Errington, Sharyn; Stocklmayer, Susan M (2001). Using museums to popularise science and technology. Commonwealth Secretariat. ISBN 978-0-85092-668-2.
- Fetherston, Joh; Stocklmayer, Sue; Stocklmayer, V. C. (2013). Gemstones of Western Australia. Geological Survey of Western Australia. ISBN 978-1-74168-449-0.
