= Questacon =

Science museum in Canberra, Australia

Questacon - The National Science and Technology Centre

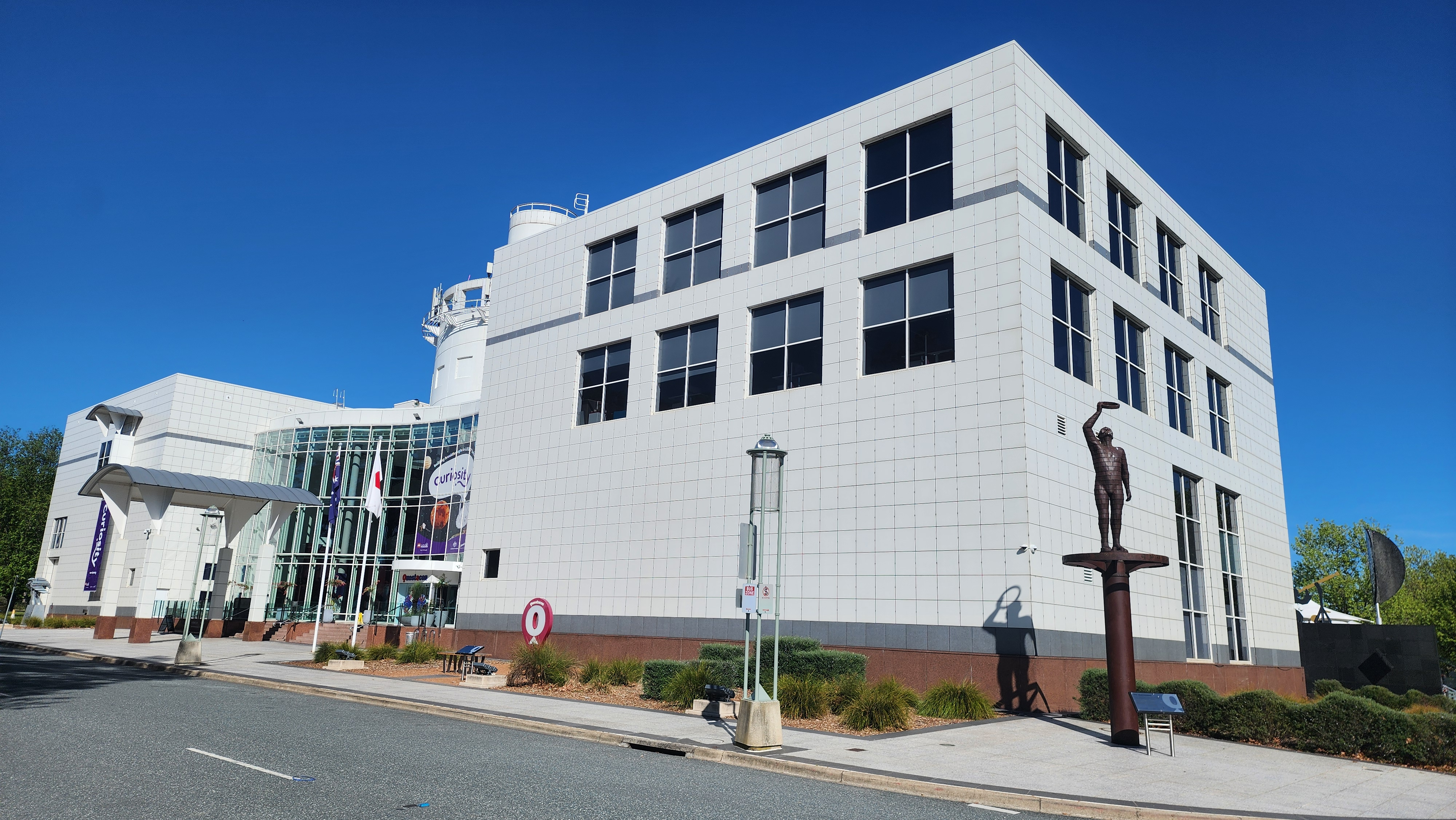
- Established: 1986 (opened in 1988)
- Location: Parkes, Australian Capital Territory, Australia
- Coordinates: 35.298333°S 149.131389°E
- Type: Science centre
- Accreditation: Asia Pacific Network of Science & Technology Centres (ASPAC)
- Visitors: 500,000 per year since 2016
- Director: Jo White
- Website: Questacon

Questacon – The National Science and Technology Centre is a science centre in Canberra, Australia. It has more than 200 interactive exhibits related to science and technology, and is a popular location for school excursions Australia-wide.

The National Science and Technology Centre hosts the Questacon Science Circus, which is a science outreach program.

== History ==
Questacon is an interactive science centre that began as a project of the Australian National University (ANU), in spare space at the Ainslie Public School in Canberra. It opened with 15 exhibits and was staffed by volunteers and by the ANU physics lecturer Professor Mike Gore AM. It inspired him to develop Australia's first interactive science centre, based on the Exploratorium in San Francisco. The name 'Questacon' combines two words— 'quest' meaning 'to discover' and 'con' meaning 'to study'. Professor Gore went on to become the founding Director of Questacon and in 2015, he received an Australia Day honour for his service to science.

Questacon's current building was given to Australia by Japan for the 1988 Bicentenary, and was opened on 23 November 1988. The Japanese government and business contributed ¥1 billion, half of the capital cost of A$19.64 million. Questacon was formerly housed at the Ainslie Primary School.

The current director is Jo White. She commenced in the role in November 2022, having moved from the Australian Institute of Botanical Science at the Royal Botanic Gardens in Sydney. Their previous director, Professor Graham Durant AM, retired in August 2021 after holding the role for 19 years.

== Galleries ==
As of 2026, there are 8 galleries:

- ZAP! CLANK! POW! involves magnets, machines, electricity and motion.
- Fundamentals explores classic science exhibitions.
- Awesome Earth looks at natural disasters and geology, featuring a Tesla coil and an earthquake simulator.
- The Q Lab has a dynamic experiment space and includes the Questacon Beehive exhibit.
- The Shed contains experimentation with ideas, tools, science, technologies, and art.
- MiniQ is designed for children between the ages of 0 and 6. Exhibits include a water play area, a construction zone, and a quiet area.
- Excite@Q showcases spectacular scientific phenomena including BATAK and the Freefall slide.
- Quantum Tomorrow: Imagined Futures explores how quantum technologies could affect daily life in near-future Australia. The exhibition includes illustrations, airborne sculptures, and a cloud chamber.

Additional exhibitions include:

- The Foyer has a Robot, the Clockwork Universe, the Cam Wave and the Questacon Shop.
- The Science Garden is a collection of outdoor exhibits. It features the NKRYPT exhibit (see more below), installed in 2013 to mark the 100th anniversary of Canberra.

Questacon has around 500,000 visitors per year. The galleries are staffed by 200 paid staff, as well as a team of about 80 volunteers.

=== Science theatre ===
The centre features several performance spaces used for presentations to the general public and student audiences by Questacon's in-house theatre troupe, the "Excited Particles". The Excited Particles also perform puppet shows for young children.

=== NKRYPT ===
NKRYPT is a sculpture installation outside the Questacon building installed in that consists of eight laser-etched stainless steel poles that each carry an encoded message. This outdoor exhibit was installed during the Centenary of Canberra in 2013. A prize was offered to the first person to solve one of the puzzles.

== Questacon Technology Learning Centre ==
The Questacon Technology Learning Centre is located at the Royal Australian Mint's former administration building in Deakin and houses more than 80 staff members. All of the outreach programs and exhibition developers, including researchers, designers, electronics, metal, and wood shop staff are based there. There are also an exhibition area, and spaces for technology workshops and holiday programs.

== Outreach programs ==
In addition to the exhibitions in Canberra, Questacon runs the Questacon Science Circus and Engineering is Elementary nationally and Q2U in the Canberra region. Past outreach programs run by Questacon include the Tenix Questacon Maths Squad, NRMA Roadzone, NRMA Tomorrow's Drivers, Starlab, Questacon Smart Moves, Questacon Science Play, Questacon Science Squad, and a number of programs in remote Indigenous communities.

=== Questacon Science Circus ===
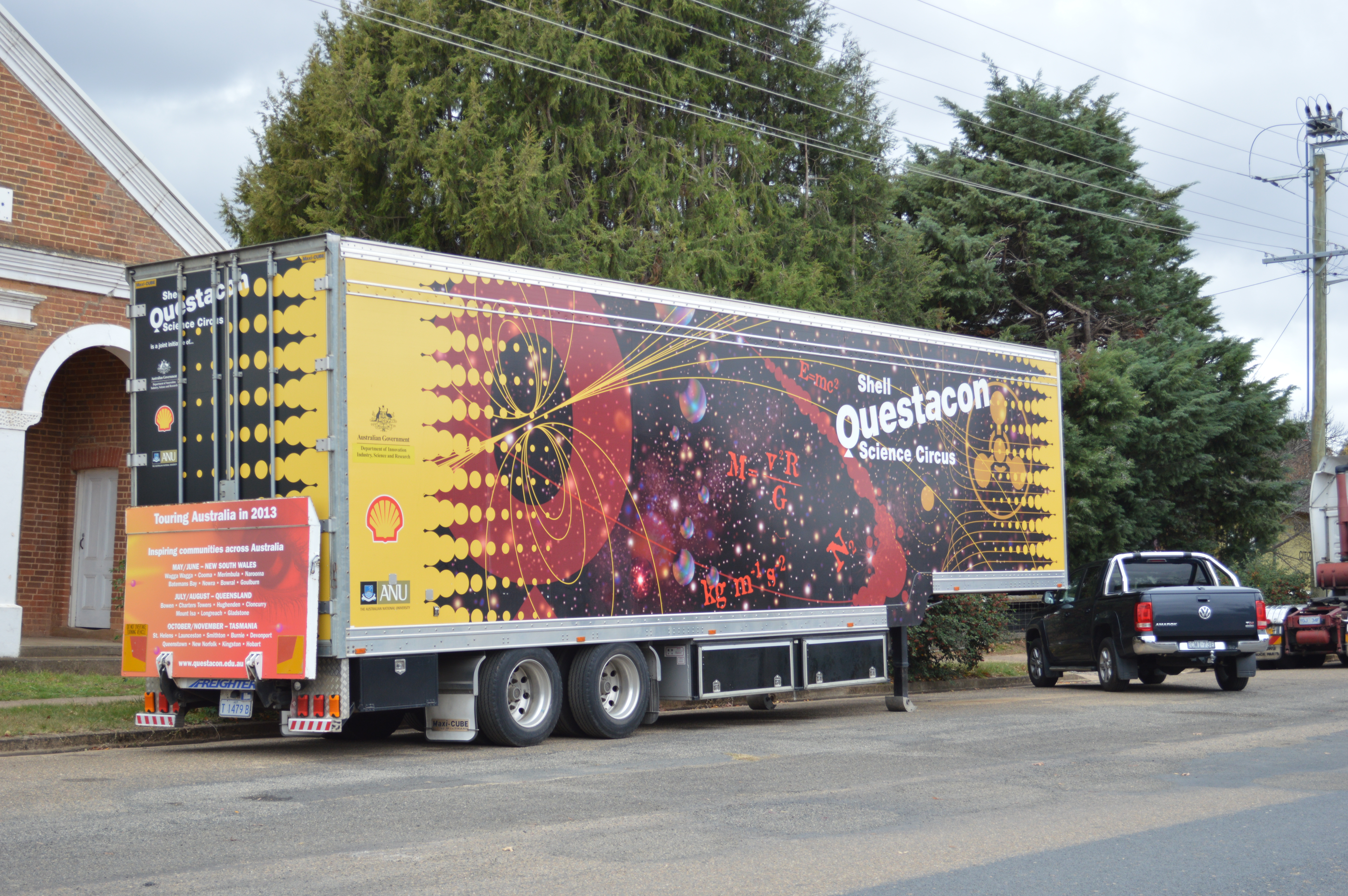
The Questacon Science Circus outreach program trailer at Boorowa, New South Wales

The Questacon Science Circus is an outreach program of Questacon and is the most extensive science outreach program of its kind. Every year, the Science Circus engages with more than 100,000 people, travels 25,000 kilometres, runs professional development courses for 600 teachers, and visits about 30 remote Indigenous communities as well as hospitals, nursing homes and special schools.

The Questacon Science Circus is a partnership between Questacon and the Australian National University. The Science Circus won the Prime Minister's Award for Community Business Partnerships in 2006.

Fifteen or sixteen science graduates staff the Science Circus as it travels, bringing lively presentations of science to towns and schools. The Science Circus supports the teaching of science and technology by running practical and fun professional development workshops for teachers. While working for the Science Circus, each presenter also completes a Masters of Science Communication Outreach through the Centre for the Public Awareness of Science at the Australian National University. Coursework includes studies in print media, program evaluation and exhibition design.

Every year the Science Circus presenters graduate from the course and a new team are selected. The first team graduated in 1988 and there are now over 300 Science Circus graduates. Graduates have contributed to programs on Australian Broadcasting Corporation Radio, the Diffusion Science Radio Show, Cosmos Magazine and The Mr. Science Show podcast.

== Photographs ==
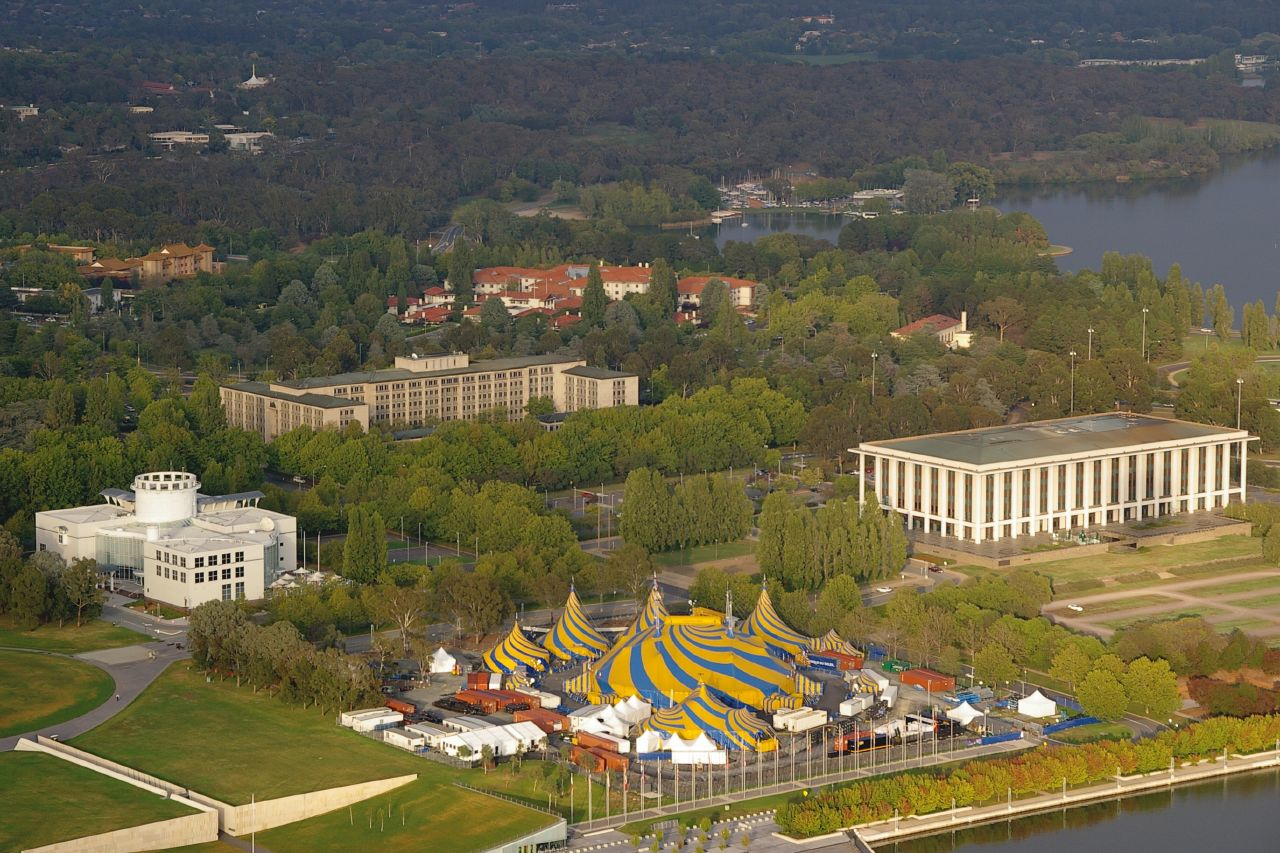
National Library, Treasury and Questacon

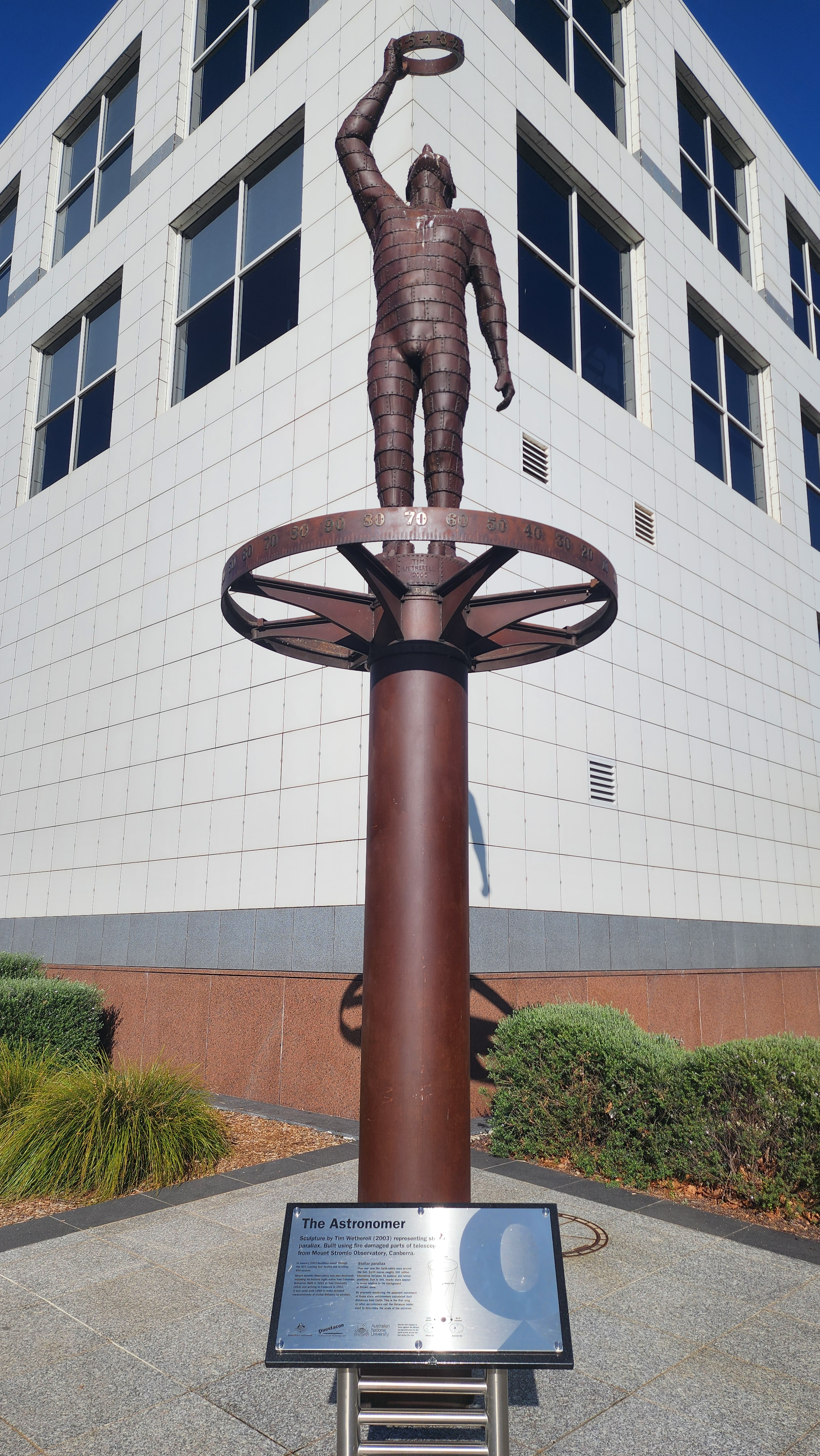
The Astronomer sculpture by Tim Wetherell

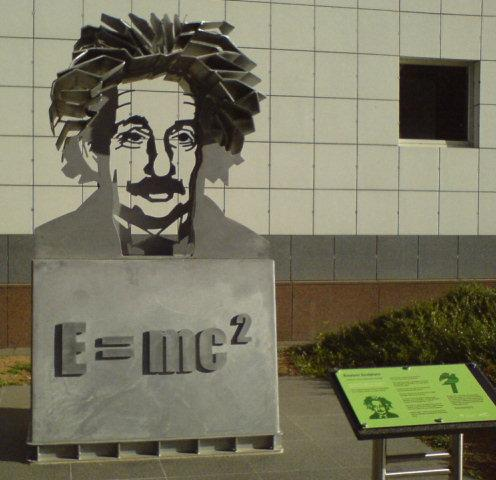
Einstein sculpture in the Science Garden

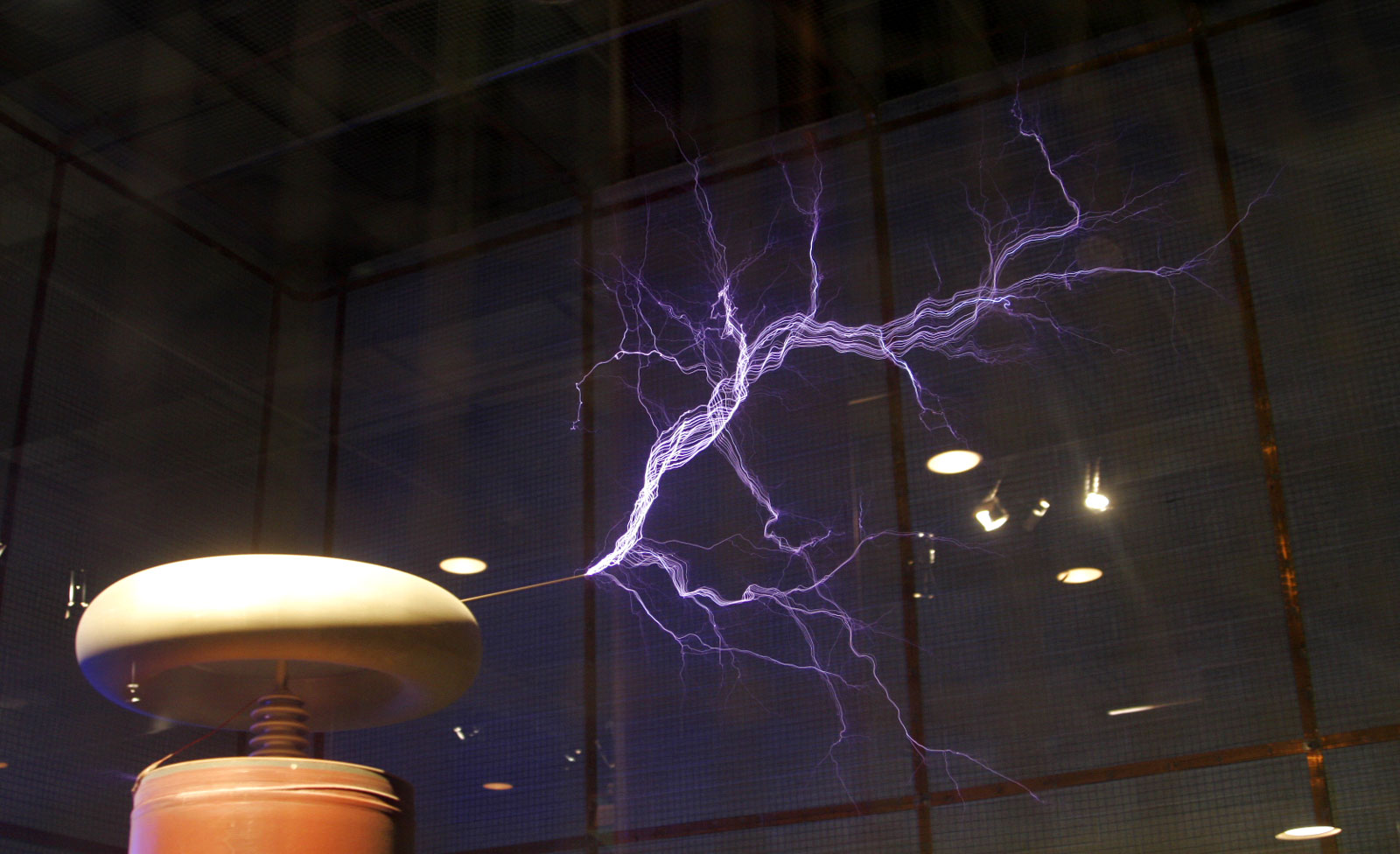
Lightning Simulator

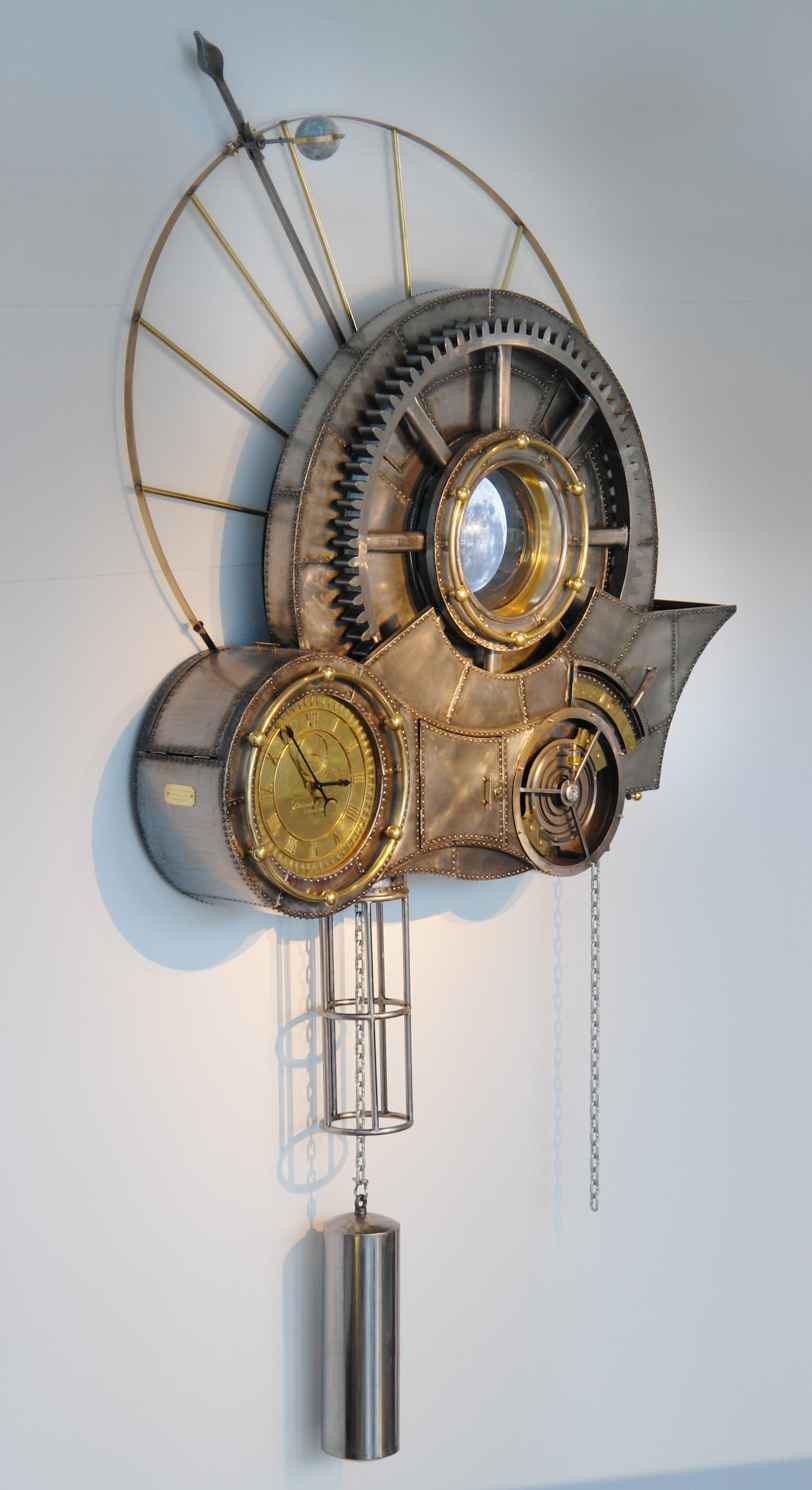
Clockwork Universe sculpture by Tim Wetherell

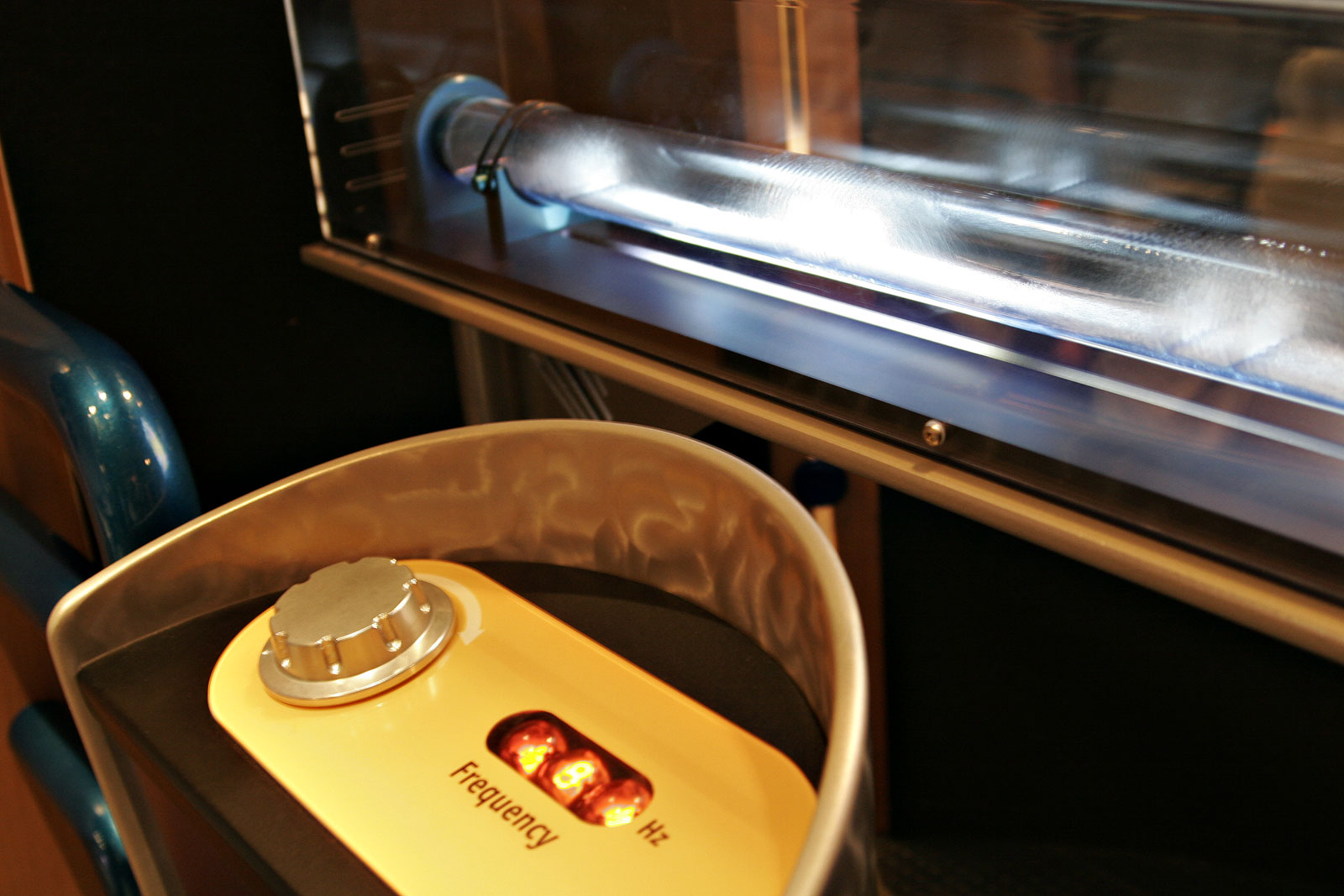
Water responding to different frequencies

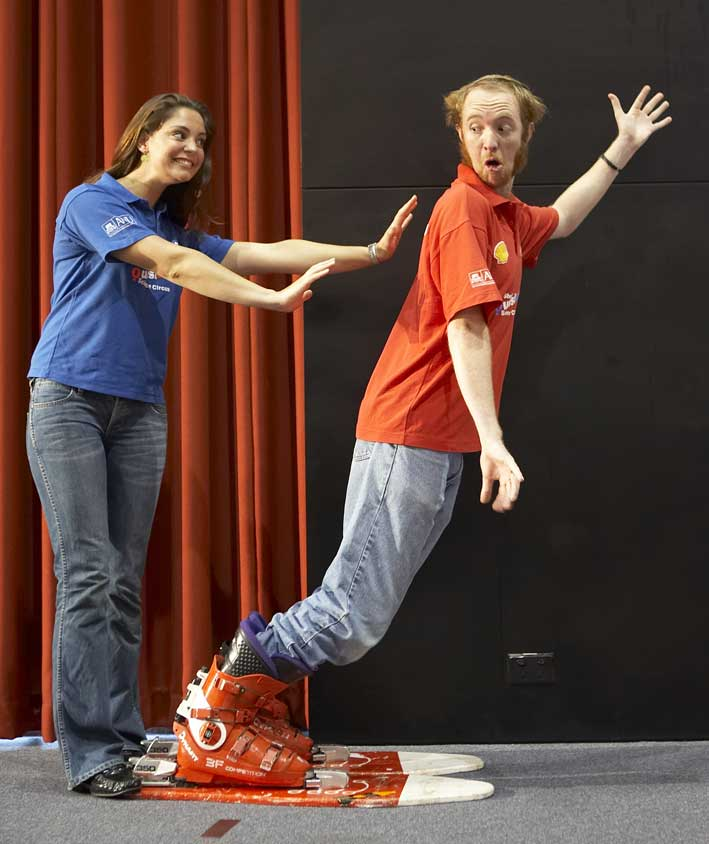
Shell Questacon Science Circus

== See also ==
- Inspiring Australia
- List of science centers
