= Deane Hutton =

Australian television presenter and futurist

Deane Winston Hutton (born 30 April 1941) is an Australian television presenter and futurist. His work on television has included 18 years as a co-writer-presenter with Rob Morrison of the Curiosity Show, and as science presenter on Hey Hey It's Saturday. Hutton has also presented science reports on the Sunday editions of Seven News in Adelaide and had some segments on the ABC show The New Inventors. Hutton also produced science videos that convey a Christian message.

== Publications ==
Hutton has written or co-written at least ten books on science and natural history, including:

- Hutton, D.W. & Morrison, R.G.B. (1980). Exploring your world: Air Brisbane: Jacaranda Wiley. ISBN 9780701613334
- Hutton, D.W. & Morrison, R.G.B. (1980). Exploring your world: Earth Brisbane: Jacaranda Wiley. ISBN 9780701613365
- Hutton, D.W. & Morrison, R.G.B. (1980). Exploring your world: Water Brisbane: Jacaranda Wiley. ISBN 0 7016 1334 3
- Hutton, D.W. & Morrison, R.G.B. (1980). Exploring your world: Fire Brisbane: Jacaranda Wiley. ISBN 0 7016 1335 1
- Hutton, D.W. & Morrison, R.G.B. (1980). Super mindstretchers Gosford: Ashton Scholastic. ISBN 0 86896 131 0
- Morrison, Rob; Hutton, Deane (1981). String for lunch, and other things to make. Sydney: Ashton Scholastic. ISBN 0868961302.
- Hutton, D.W. & Morrison, R.G.B. (1984). What happens when ..... Brisbane: Jacaranda Press. ISBN 0 7016 1780 2
- Hutton, D.W. & Morrison, R.G.B. (1985). What happens ... and why? Brisbane: Jacaranda Press. ISBN 0 7016 1903 1
- Hutton, D.W. & Morrison, R.G.B. (1985). Arrow book of things to make and do, Gosford: Ashton Scholastic. ISBN 0 86896 304 6
- Hutton, D.W. & Morrison, R.G.B. (1986). Let's experiment, Brisbane: Jacaranda Press. ISBN 0 7016 2125 7
