= The Curiosity Show =

Australian educational children's television show (1972-1990) and YouTube channel

- Genre: Factual
- Written by: Deane Hutton; Rob Morrison
- Presented by: Deane Hutton; Rob Morrison
- Country of origin: Australia
- Original language: English
- No. of seasons: 19
- No. of episodes: 500

Production
- Production location: Adelaide, South Australia
- Running time: 60 minutes (1972–1980); 30 minutes (1981–1990)
- Production companies: Banksia Productions; Entertainment Rights Distribution (some countries)

Original release
- Network: Nine Network
- Release: 1972 – 1990

The Curiosity Show is an Australian educational children's television show produced from 1972 to 1990 and hosted by Rob Morrison and Deane Hutton. The show was produced by Banksia Productions in South Australia for the Nine Network. 500 episodes were produced across 19 seasons. Clips from episodes have been archived on YouTube for preservation.

== History ==
Banksia Productions produced the popular children's series Here's Humphrey from 1965. The company planned to add some science segments in 1971 and sought assistance from the South Australian Institute of Technology. Rob Morrison and Deane Hutton were selected as presenters and the segments were introduced as Humphrey B Bear's Curiosity Show. After positive reception from the audience, Banksia Productions and the Nine Network agreed to produce a spin-off series. Planning commenced with the working title The F Show.

Until the early 1970s, children's television was aimed at younger children. The broadcasting regulations were changed to require a proportion of programs to be aimed at school-age children, broadcast after school hours. This prompted the creation of the Curiosity Show as a separate show.

The Curiosity Show was screened nationally in Australia as well as in Europe, Asia, and Australasia in 14 countries, and it was dubbed in German for Europe.

== Format ==
From 1972 to 1980 the format was a 60-minute show presented by Morrison, Hutton, Ian Fairweather, Alister Smart, Belinda Davey, Gabrielle Kelly, Dr Mark Dwyer and Lynn Weston. The emphasis was on science but also included general craft and music. Producers were Neil Smith, Kate Kennedy White (1978–79), James Lingwood (1980) and Ian Smyth.

From 1980 the show was reduced to 30 minutes, presented by Morrison and Hutton, with emphasis on science, nature and the environment.

The Curiosity Show won many national and international awards, including the coveted Prix Jeunesse in 1984, voted by peers from around the world as the best factual program for children.

The program placed a strong emphasis on practical demonstrations of various science topics, and included activities such as floating a ping-pong ball on a stream of air, recreating historical devices, setting off a room full of mouse traps, the science of musical instruments and freezing objects with liquid nitrogen. Commonly, segments presented scientific concepts in the form of tricks and puzzles.

Many segments described a sequence of steps to build something out of common household materials with longer builds invariably ending with the phrase "here's one I prepared earlier" so as to keep the segment moving. Hutton's catchphrase, after presenting a hypothesis he postulates the audience may be curious about, was to declare "well, I'm glad you asked," before responding to the hypothesis. The use of household materials was deliberate, in order to demystify science and ensure that children, wherever they lived, could make what they needed rather than rely on buying it, and this proved popular with the young audience who could easily replicate the demonstrations at home. Morrison suggested that they should always show what they had made working so that children would know that their own constructions would work if made properly and also to show the limitations of the constructions to dispel any overambitious expectations. Both Morrison and Hutton always told viewers to get their parents' permission before building things or conducting experiments, especially if it involved the use of sharp objects such as knives or scissors or the use of flames or hot or dangerous liquids.

== Spin-offs ==
Four companion books were available in 1981 produced by Jacaranda Press containing scientific explanations and instructions for experiments for children to perform at home. Each of the books was themed upon one of the four Western classical elements of earth, air, fire and water. Together, Hutton and Morrison published 11 books, including Supermindstretchers,The Arrow Book of Things to Make and Do, and String for Lunch (Ashton Scholastic). Morrison published more than 40 additional books, which included material from The Curiosity Show, including Nature in the Making, A Field Guide to the Tracks and Traces of Australian Animals (the first such field guide in Australia and still the only one to deal with all taxa), Clever and Quirky Creatures, It's Raining Frogs and Fishes, and many more for the school reading programs of various publishers. Morrison's Field Guide to Tracks and Traces—and a segment he had prepared for The Curiosity Show on dingos at Uluru—led to his involvement in the Morling Royal Commission inquiry into the Chamberlain convictions. He gave evidence on dingo and dog tracks and conducted various forensic investigations on dingo gapes and behaviour. His collection of specimens and artifacts from the trial have been acquired by the National Museum of Australia.

The Children's Television Workshop wanted to make a version of the Curiosity Show using American scientists as presenters. Rob Morrison and Deane Hutton were consultants in the early planning stages. PBS did not think that middle-aged scientists would engage a young audience (despite the popularity of the format in Australia) and insisted that any science show be hosted/presented by young people. CTW eventually reworked the concept into 3-2-1 Contact.

In 2014, The Curiosity Show produced a brief online series which was available on YouTube. It was co-hosted by Morrison and Hutton again.

== YouTube channel ==
In 2013, the show's former hosts, Hutton and Morrison, announced they had purchased the remaining rights to the show for an undisclosed sum from Banksia Productions, which had gone into liquidation. On 12 July 2013, in conjunction with producer Enabled Solutions, they launched a YouTube channel, CuriosityShow, to make the episodes and segments available for a new generation of viewers. There are some 1,000 segments, and some have attracted significant audiences, especially in the United States and India; as of June 2025, one segment about self-starting siphons had been viewed more than 4 million times, while another video, entitled "The mysterious isochronous curve", has been viewed 11 million times; in addition, their channel has amassed 440,000 subscribers and 75 million views from a current upload total of 1,539 videos.

In May 2014, Hutton and Morrison released, on their YouTube channel, the "Curiosity Show's first new episode since 1990". The online production was funded with the assistance of Kellogg's Australia. The episode followed the original format of the program, supported by extra internet resources, with Hutton and Morrison performing experiments related to cereal, including making homemade cornflakes and cornflour-based non-Newtonian fluid. The episode was praised by the channel's followers.

== Awards ==
International awards

- 1984 Winner of Prix Jeunesse Internationale, Munich.
- 1985 Silver medal, International Film and Television Festival of New York.
- 1985 Museum of Broadcasting, New York.
- 1990 Television Award, Children's Film and Television, China.

National awards

- 1975 Commendation, Television Society of Australia.
- 1976 Commendation, Television Society of Australia.
- 1977 Commendation, Television Society of Australia.
- 1978 Commendation, Television Society of Australia.
- 1979 Special Commendation, Television Society of Australia.
- 1981 Commendation, Television Society of Australia.
- 1982 Gold Penguin Award, Television Society of Australia.

== See also ==
- List of longest-running Australian television series
