= Rob Morrison (scientist) =

Australian professor of zoology, co-presenter of The Curiosity Show

Rob Morrison OAM
- Born: Robert Gwydir Booth Morrison; 14 November 1942 (age 84); Adelaide, South Australia, Australia
- Known for: Science communication
- Spouse: Penelope
- Children: 2

Academic work
- Discipline: Zoology
- Institutions: Flinders University
- Website: flinders.edu.au/people/rob.morrison

Robert Gwydir Booth Morrison, OAM CF (born 14 November 1942) is an Australian zoologist and science communicator. He co-hosted The Curiosity Show which aired on television from 1972 to 1990. He has written or co-written 48 books about science for the general public.

Morrison is a Professorial Fellow in the College of Education, Psychology and Social Work at Flinders University. He is also a past President of the Royal Zoological Society of South Australia (now publicised as "Zoos SA"). His research has focused on comparative anatomy of the mammalian olfactory system, the identification of animals from tracks and traces, the design of artificial nesting boxes, and techniques to breed animals and birds which face extinction in their native habitats in order to reintroduce them in the wild. He was called as an expert witness concerning dingoes in the case of Azaria Chamberlain's death. He is a founding member of the Friends of Science in Medicine, and he served as its Vice President for many years.

He was awarded the Medal of the Order of Australia for his services to conservation and science communication. In 2008 he was named the Senior Australian of the Year for South Australia.

== Academic career ==
As a child, Morrison says he wanted to be "a farmer, then zookeeper then vet — anything to do with animals".

Morrison studied at St Peter's College, Adelaide, and he went on to study at the University of Adelaide, earning his Bachelor of Science in zoology, physiology, and psychology in 1965, followed by Honours in 1966, and his Ph.D in neuroanatomy and neurophysiology in 1971. His PhD thesis was Comparative Studies on the Olfactory System of the Mammal (University of Adelaide, December 1969). In 1972 he was awarded a Churchill Fellowship to study in the UK, and in 1972–73 he was a post-doctoral Research Fellow in animal behaviour at the University of Edinburgh, working with the noted animal behavior expert and television presenter Professor Aubrey Manning.

On his return to Australia, he lectured at Sturt College of Advanced Education, the South Australian College of Advanced Education, and Flinders University in zoology, animal behaviour and human biology and he introduced a course on field studies based on his experience during his Churchill Fellowship. Initially he combined his academic roles with writing books and radio and television work, but in 1995 he resigned from the university to focus on his career in writing and the media. In 2007 he was appointed a Professorial Fellow in the College of Education, Psychology and Social Work.

=== Research ===
Initially, Morrison's researches continued his PhD topic of mammalian olfactory systems. While at Flinders University, he developed an interest in researching nestboxes. He conducted a statewide project called "The Nestbox Project" in South Australian schools over 1992 and 1993, getting students to design, build and monitor nestboxes to see what used them. This supported the development of better designs, and educated children as to the value of the hollows in dead trees which were being cleared. The project's results were published in Nature Australia. Its design suggestions were summarised in a joint publication with major ornithological groups, and thousands were made and deployed as part of Rotary's ROBIN project.

From 2000 to 2006, Morrison was President of the Royal Zoological Society of South Australia (promoted as "Zoos SA"), where he oversaw both the smallest metropolitan zoo in Australia, Adelaide Zoo, and the largest, Monarto Zoo (now Monarto Safari Park). During this period, the Society membership grew three-fold. He chaired the Society's Research Committee and one of the major research projects during this period involved accelerated breeding programs for animals and birds which had become endangered or extinct in their native habitats in order to reintroduce them in the wild, including Yellow-tailed black cockatoos, the Mongolian wild horse and the bilby. Their vet (David Schultz) pioneered the surrogacy technique of using more common species of wallabies to foster the translated joeys of rarer species, allowing the rare mothers to bring on more joeys much faster and greatly increasing the number of individuals of that species.

== Science media ==
Morrison is a passionate science communicator, telling an interviewer: "Science should be as much a part of the spectrum of civilised people’s interests as art, music and politics."

For over thirty years, he was a regular contributor and columnist for works including The New Inventors, Science Magazine, Chemistry in Australia, Ockham’s Razor, and The Science Show on ABC Radio National. On television, in addition to The Curiosity Show, he was the Channel Ten News science correspondent for ten years, and made regular appearances on shows including The New Inventors, as producer and presenter of science segments for Nexus, a program which was produced by the ABC for the Australian government and broadcast to more than 40 countries in the Asia Pacific region via the Australia Network, and Science Magazine. He has written or co-written 48 books for the general public about science and natural history.

Nowadays, he jokingly observes that "It's a bit daunting when some middle-aged, bald bloke comes up and says 'you were a great influence when I was young.'"

=== The Curiosity Show ===
"What kid doesn't love volcanoes, dinosaurs, animals and explosions."

— Rob Morrison

In 1971, Morrison was invited onto the Channel 9 children's show Here's Humphrey to talk about a possum which he was hand-rearing. The day after that shoot, the network offered him the job as presenter for their new show, which became The Curiosity Show. Morrison and scientist Deane Hutton co-hosted over 500 episodes of The Curiosity Show which aired between 1972 and 1990, in 14 countries. The emphasis was on science and nature, with a strong emphasis on practical demonstrations, and it also included general craft and music. The Curiosity Show won many national and international awards, including the Prix Jeunesse International in 1984, voted by peers from around the world as the best factual program for children.

In 2013, the show's former hosts, Hutton and Morrison, announced they had purchased the remaining rights to the show and around 5,000 segments. The show was repackaged as an online YouTube channel and launched in 2014. As of August 2022 the channel has over 330,000 subscribers. His books on science and natural history included 10 written with Deane Hutton which featured material from The Curiosity Show, including companion books containing scientific explanations and instructions for experiments for children to perform at home themed on the four Western classical elements of earth, air, fire and water.

== Community engagement ==
In addition to his formal academic roles and media work, Morrison has been involved with bodies that champion scientific literacy, evidence-based medicine and policies. He is cited in the media as an expert on fields including the role of the Therapeutic Goods Administration, government restrictions on dangerous "alternative health" practices and the risks of university courses in health-related subjects which are not backed by appropriate standards of evidence. He is also a commentator on matters of the balance between the economy and ecology. In 2010 when the federal Department of Innovation, Industry, Science and Research conducted a review of science communication as a step towards a "national strategy", his evaluation was a supplement.

He chaired the Anti-Rabbit Research Foundation of Australia (ARRFA) from 1995 to 1998, investigating ways to reduce this introduced pest so that native animals and plants can get re-established. This organization was renamed in 1998 to The Foundation for Rabbit-Free Australia (RFA). In the 1990s they introduced chocolate "Easter Bilbies" as an alternative to conventional Easter rabbits, to publicise the plight of native animals brought about by rabbits. In addition, some chocolate makers have helped to raise funds by donating part of the sales of chocolate bilbies to the Foundation.

In 2007 he jointly established SciWorld, a mobile not-for-profit science education organization in Adelaide which runs education programs and regional science fairs and shows, and he was its inaugural chairman. SciWorld came after the closure of The Investigator Science and Technology Centre in Adelaide; Morrison and three co-founders bought the assets and formed SciWorld to keep interactive science going in the state.

In 2015, SciWorld partnered with the Australian Science and Mathematics School to offer cadetships for young people in the field of science communication.

He was Patron of National Science Week SA for 13 years.

Morrison was for many years Vice-President of the organisation "Friends of Science in Medicine" (FSM), which he jointly founded in 2011, described by the University of Adelaide as "a public health watch dog group ... concerned about honesty in medical claims and the need for evidence-based medicine".

He created the Lesueur Conservation Park (part of which was previously called Cape Hart Conservation Park), a 14.14 square kilometres (5.46 mi^{2}; 3,490 acres) reserve including a 2 kilometres (1.2 mi) length of coastline on Kangaroo Island.

Morrison was called as an expert witness in the third trial looking into the death of Azaria Chamberlain. He had been in the area of Uluru several months before that incident, filming and collecting materials for his book A Field Guide to the Tracks and Traces of Australian Animals, and he had presented for The Curiosity Show on dingoes at Uluru. He testified at the Morling enquiry into the Chamberlain Convictions about why local trackers had given conflicting evidence about dingo tracks, and he conducted forensic tests to show that dingoes had the strength, the gape, and the dexterity needed to take the baby and remove her clothes. His collection of specimens and artefacts from the trial have since been acquired by the National Museum of Australia.

== Personal life ==
Morrison and his wife Penny have two sons. His hobbies include being a jazz musician (playing trumpet and trombone), ship-bottler, and silversmith. He also has an interest in maritime history, and he was involved in bringing the clipper ship City of Adelaide back to South Australia. He also produced a simplified model of that ship, aimed at allowing primary school children to build the ship in a bottle.

== Awards and recognition ==
In the 2004 Australia Day honours, Morrison was awarded the Medal of the Order of Australia (OAM) in recognition of his "service to conservation and the environment, and to the fields of science education and communication". In 2008, he was South Australia's "Senior Australian of the Year" and a finalist for the national "Senior Australian of the Year".

Other awards and recognitions include:

- 1972: Awarded a Churchill Fellowship to study in the UK.
- 1994: Michael Daley Award for Science Journalism.
- 1995–2017: Councillor of Nature Foundation SA
- 2002: Eureka Prize for critical thinking awarded by the Australian Skeptics
- 2003: Awarded Honorary Research Associate, Royal Zoological Society of South Australia
- 2005: inaugural winner of the South Australian Premier's Award for Science Communication Excellence
- 2007: Won the Australian Museum Eureka Prize for promoting understanding of science, after being a finalist for the same prize the previous year and in 1999.
- 2006–2012: National Vice President, Australian Science Communicators
- 2010: Australia Day Ambassador for South Australia.
- 2012: Jointly with the other founding members of Friends of Science in Medicine, named as the "Skeptics of the Year" by the Australian Skeptics.
- 2015: Inaugural winner; Bert Davis Spoken Word Award and People's Choice.
- 2015: Delivered the Golden Jubilee Address at the University of Adelaide
- 2017: Elected a Lifetime Fellow of Nature Foundation
- 2018: Patron, Adelaide Hills Science Hub (Inspiring Australia)

== Publications ==
=== Books ===
Morrison has written or co-written 48 books on science and natural history, including:

- Morrison, Rob (1972). A stereotaxic atlas of the guinea-pig forebrain, Adelaide: S.A. Dept. of Education.
- Hutton, D.W. & Morrison, R.G.B. (1980). Exploring your world: Air Brisbane: Jacaranda Wiley. ISBN 9780701613334
- Hutton, D.W. & Morrison, R.G.B. (1980). Exploring your world: Earth Brisbane: Jacaranda Wiley. ISBN 9780701613365
- Hutton, D.W. & Morrison, R.G.B. (1980). Exploring your world: Water Brisbane: Jacaranda Wiley. ISBN 0 7016 1334 3
- Hutton, D.W. & Morrison, R.G.B. (1980). Exploring your world: Fire Brisbane: Jacaranda Wiley. ISBN 0 7016 1335 1
- Hutton, D.W. & Morrison, R.G.B. (1980). Super mindstretchers Gosford: Ashton Scholastic. ISBN 0 86896 131 0
- Morrison, R.G.B. (1981). A Field Guide to the Tracks and Traces of Australian Animals. Adelaide: Rigby. ISBN 0727014897.
- Morrison, Rob; Hutton, Deane (1981). String for lunch, and other things to make. Sydney: Ashton Scholastic. ISBN 0868961302.
- Hutton, D.W. & Morrison, R.G.B. (1984). What happens when ..... Brisbane: Jacaranda Press. ISBN 0 7016 1780 2
- Hutton, D.W. & Morrison, R.G.B. (1985). What happens ... and why? Brisbane: Jacaranda Press. ISBN 0 7016 1903 1
- Hutton, D.W. & Morrison, R.G.B. (1985). Arrow book of things to make and do, Gosford: Ashton Scholastic. ISBN 0 86896 304 6
- Hutton, D.W. & Morrison, R.G.B. (1986). Let’s experiment, Brisbane: Jacaranda Press. ISBN 0 7016 2125 7
- Morrison, Rob (1988). Experimenting with Science. Melbourne: Horwitz Grahame. ISBN 0 7253 1068 5
- Morrison, Rob (1989). Scientifically Speaking. Melbourne: Horwitz Grahame. ISBN 0 7253 1171 1
- Morrison, Rob (1989). Nature in the Making: Over 100 Things to Make and Do from The Curiosity Show. Willoughby, N.S.W.: Weldon ISBN 0 947116 65 6
- Morrison, Rob (1990). Space Technology. Milton, Qld.: Jacaranda Press. ISBN 9780701626938.
- Morrison, Rob (1990). What's up There?. Milton, Qld.: Jacaranda Press. ISBN 0701626887.
- Morrison, Rob (1991). It’s Raining Fish and Frogs, Adelaide: Omnibus. ISBN 1 86291 071 5
- Morrison, Rob (1992). The Australian Desert. Milton, Qld.: Jacaranda. ISBN 0701628022.
- Morrison, Rob (1992). Technology and the Environment. Milton, Qld.: Jacaranda Press. ISBN 9780701630447.
- Morrison, Rob (1994). X-rays. Illustrations by Don Black. Santa Rosa, California: SRA. ISBN 978-0383037893.
- Morrison, Rob; Morrison, Penelope (1994). Snorkels for tadpoles. Santa Rosa, California: SRA. ISBN 978-0383037756.
- Morrison, Rob; Morrison, James (1994). Monsters! Just Imagine (Voyages Series, Gathering Speed). Warren Crossett (Illustrator). Thomas Nelson Australia. ASIN B000E7R6XS.
- Morrison, Rob (1994). Tracks. Santa Rosa, California: SRA. ISBN 978-0383037213.
- Morrison, Rob (1995). Weather. Port Melbourne, Vic.: Rigby. ISBN 0731218280.
- Morrison, Rob (1996). Life in the Mangroves, Melbourne: Rigby Heinemann. ISBN 0 7312 2062 5
- Morrison, Rob (1996). Inventions: Then and Now. Illustrated by Xiangyi Mo. Port Melbourne, Vic.: Rigby Heinemann. ISBN 9780731220861.
- Morrison, Rob (1996). All about plants. Port Melbourne, Victoria: Rigby Heinemann. ISBN 9780731220922.
- Morrison, Rob (1997). Splish, Splash, Splosh. Port Melbourne, Vic.: Rigby Heinemann. ISBN 9780731220731.
- Morrison, Rob (1997). It’s Alive, Port Melbourne: Rigby Heinemann. ISBN 0 7312 2262 8
- Morrison, Rob (1997). Machines. Port Melbourne, Vic.: Rigby Heinemann. ISBN 9780731223008.
- Morrison, Rob (1997). Flows and Quakes and Spinning Winds, Melbourne: Rigby Heinemann. ISBN 0 7312 2274 1
- Morrison, Rob (1997). Inventions Then and Now, Melbourne: Rigby Heinemann. ISBN 0 7312 2086 2
- Morrison, Rob (1997). How Does It Grow?, Melbourne: Rigby Heinemann. ISBN 0 7312 2267 9
- Morrison, Rob (1997). Caring for our Trees, Melbourne: Rigby Heinemann. ISBN 0 7312 2213 X
- Phillips, Hugo; Gunn, Tim; Trainor, Russell; Morrison, Rob; McCulloch, Ellen (1997). Grant, Jim (ed.). The Nestbox Book. Victoria: Gould League. ISBN 1-875687-34-3.
- Morrison, Rob (2000). What is Energy?. Port Melbourne: Rigby Heinemann. ISBN 9780731227600. Also released as an audio book in 2008: Trove entry
- Morrison, Rob (2001) [First published 1994]. Natural Disasters. Port Melbourne: Heinemann Library. ISBN 9781740700306.
- Morrison, R.G.B. (2001). Clever and Quirky Creatures. Port Melbourne, Victoria: Rigby. ISBN 0 7312 3328 X
- Morrison, Rob (2001). Adelaide Zoo. Adelaide: Royal Zoological Society of South Australia. ISBN 9780959604863.
- Morrison, R.G.B. (2001). What's up There? Port Melbourne, Victoria: Rigby. ISBN 0 7016 2688 7 Reprinted and altered in 2000 978-0731232772
- Morrison, Rob (2001). Our Earth, Our Future, Melbourne: Rigby Heinemann. ISBN 0 7312 3284 4
- Morrison, Rob (2001). The Language of Ships. Pearson Australia. ISBN 9780731232581.
- Morrison, Rob (2007). Energy: Series A Unit 3: Machines. Port Melbourne, Vic.: Rigby. ISBN 9780731273669.
- Morrison, Rob (2007), Energy (Topic Book); New Literacy Series, Melbourne: Rigby Heinemann. ISBN 978 0 7312 7366 9
- Morrison, Rob (2007), Machines and Their Parts (Topic Book); New Literacy Series, Melbourne: Rigby Heinemann. ISBN 978 0 7312 7365 2
- Morrison, Rob (2008), Fuel for Thought: Our Energy Sources, Melbourne: Rigby Blue Prints; Pearson Education Australia. ISBN 978 1 7414 0143 1
- Morrison, Rob (2019), Curious Recollections; Life in The Curiosity Show, South Australia: Wakefield Press. ISBN 978 1 7430 5670 7

==== Chapters ====
- "Edwardian Spin-offs" In All Us Apes, and Other Scientific Wisdom from Ockham's Razor. ABC Books, Sydney, 1997, pp 152–9.

=== Selected journal articles ===
Morrison has published extensively in scientific journals. The following are, perhaps, of most interest to the general reader or led to prizes such as the Eureka:

- "Centripetal and centrifugal olfactory connections in the guinea-pig". Aust. J. Exp. Biol. Med. Sci. (47): 23. 1969.
- "Emergence of the pygmy Antechinus". Australian Natural History. 18 (5): 164–167. 1975.
- "An observation of ground-nesting in sugar gliders". South Australian Naturalist. 52 (4): 64. 1978.
- "The Nestbox Project". Nature Australia: 56–63. Winter 1996.
- "Will the real Easter Bilby please stand up?". Australasian Science (Incorporating Search). 19 (3): 33. April 1998.
- "Publish and Perish". Australasian Science (Incorporating Search). 19 (7): 15. August 1998.
- "New Woomera Telescope". Sky and Space: 12. June–July 2000.
- "Lights put Astronomers in the Dark". Sky and Space: 12. August–September 2000.
- "Cutting the Noise out of Heartbeats". Australasian Science: 41–42. March 2001.
- "Australian Innovation Analyses World's Weather". Australasian Science: 8–9. September 2001.
- "Universities Combine to Provide New Tissue-imaging Facility". Australasian Science. September 2001.
- "Trust me, I'm a science communicator". Australasian Science: 17–21. October 2001.
- "Straightening out Blinky Bill". Australasian Science: 10. October 2001.
- "Tunnel Forms Geological Test Tube". Australasian Science: 8–9. October 2001.
- "Tree-Bound Kangaroo Saved by Pidgin". Australasian Science: 11. September 2002.
- "Communities Watch Outback Waterways". Australasian Science: 36–37. October 2002.
- "Trust Me, I'm a Science Communicator". The Skeptic. 22 (3): 14–17. Spring 2002.
- Regular column "Science <-> Society" in Chemistry in Australia.
