= Lists of statutes of the Australian Capital Territory =

This is an incomplete list of ordinances of the Australian Capital Territory and acts of the Legislative Assembly of the Australian Capital Territory.

== Ordinances ==
Ordinances made by the Governor-General pursuant to the Seat of Government (Administration) Act 1910 (Cth).

=== 20th century ===
==== 1910-1919 ====
- List of ordinances of the Australian Capital Territory from 1911
- List of ordinances of the Australian Capital Territory from 1912
- List of ordinances of the Australian Capital Territory from 1913
- List of ordinances of the Australian Capital Territory from 1914
- List of ordinances of the Australian Capital Territory from 1916
- List of ordinances of the Australian Capital Territory from 1917
- List of ordinances of the Australian Capital Territory from 1918
- List of ordinances of the Australian Capital Territory from 1919

==== 1920-1929 ====
- List of ordinances of the Australian Capital Territory from 1920
- List of ordinances of the Australian Capital Territory from 1921
- List of ordinances of the Australian Capital Territory from 1922
- List of ordinances of the Australian Capital Territory from 1923
- List of ordinances of the Australian Capital Territory from 1924
- List of ordinances of the Australian Capital Territory from 1925
- List of ordinances of the Australian Capital Territory from 1926
- List of ordinances of the Australian Capital Territory from 1927
- List of ordinances of the Australian Capital Territory from 1928
- List of ordinances of the Australian Capital Territory from 1929

==== 1930-1939 ====
- List of ordinances of the Australian Capital Territory from 1930
- List of ordinances of the Australian Capital Territory from 1931
- List of ordinances of the Australian Capital Territory from 1932
- List of ordinances of the Australian Capital Territory from 1933
- List of ordinances of the Australian Capital Territory from 1934
- List of ordinances of the Australian Capital Territory from 1935
- List of ordinances of the Australian Capital Territory from 1936
- List of ordinances of the Australian Capital Territory from 1937
- List of ordinances of the Australian Capital Territory from 1938
- List of ordinances of the Australian Capital Territory from 1939

==== 1940-1949 ====
- List of ordinances of the Australian Capital Territory from 1940
- List of ordinances of the Australian Capital Territory from 1941
- List of ordinances of the Australian Capital Territory from 1942
- List of ordinances of the Australian Capital Territory from 1943
- List of ordinances of the Australian Capital Territory from 1944
- List of ordinances of the Australian Capital Territory from 1945
- List of ordinances of the Australian Capital Territory from 1946
- List of ordinances of the Australian Capital Territory from 1947
- List of ordinances of the Australian Capital Territory from 1948
- List of ordinances of the Australian Capital Territory from 1949

==== 1950-1959 ====
- List of ordinances of the Australian Capital Territory from 1950
- List of ordinances of the Australian Capital Territory from 1951
- List of ordinances of the Australian Capital Territory from 1952
- List of ordinances of the Australian Capital Territory from 1953
- List of ordinances of the Australian Capital Territory from 1954
- List of ordinances of the Australian Capital Territory from 1955
- List of ordinances of the Australian Capital Territory from 1956
- List of ordinances of the Australian Capital Territory from 1957
- List of ordinances of the Australian Capital Territory from 1958
- List of ordinances of the Australian Capital Territory from 1959

==== 1960-1969 ====
- List of ordinances of the Australian Capital Territory from 1960
- List of ordinances of the Australian Capital Territory from 1961
- List of ordinances of the Australian Capital Territory from 1962
- List of ordinances of the Australian Capital Territory from 1963
- List of ordinances of the Australian Capital Territory from 1964
- List of ordinances of the Australian Capital Territory from 1965
- List of ordinances of the Australian Capital Territory from 1966
- List of ordinances of the Australian Capital Territory from 1967
- List of ordinances of the Australian Capital Territory from 1968
- List of ordinances of the Australian Capital Territory from 1969

==== 1970-1979 ====
- List of ordinances of the Australian Capital Territory from 1970
- List of ordinances of the Australian Capital Territory from 1971
- List of ordinances of the Australian Capital Territory from 1972
- List of ordinances of the Australian Capital Territory from 1973
- List of ordinances of the Australian Capital Territory from 1974
- List of ordinances of the Australian Capital Territory from 1975
- List of ordinances of the Australian Capital Territory from 1976
- List of ordinances of the Australian Capital Territory from 1977
- List of ordinances of the Australian Capital Territory from 1978
- List of ordinances of the Australian Capital Territory from 1979

==== 1980-1989 ====
- List of ordinances of the Australian Capital Territory from 1980
- List of ordinances of the Australian Capital Territory from 1981
- List of ordinances of the Australian Capital Territory from 1982
- List of ordinances of the Australian Capital Territory from 1983
- List of ordinances of the Australian Capital Territory from 1984
- List of ordinances of the Australian Capital Territory from 1985
- List of ordinances of the Australian Capital Territory from 1986
- List of ordinances of the Australian Capital Territory from 1987
- List of ordinances of the Australian Capital Territory from 1988
- List of ordinances of the Australian Capital Territory from 1989

==== 1990-1999 ====
- List of ordinances of the Australian Capital Territory from 1990
- List of ordinances of the Australian Capital Territory from 1992
- List of ordinances of the Australian Capital Territory from 1993
- List of ordinances of the Australian Capital Territory from 1994
- List of ordinances of the Australian Capital Territory from 1997
- List of ordinances of the Australian Capital Territory from 1998

=== 21st century ===
==== 2000-2009 ====
- List of ordinances of the Australian Capital Territory from 2001
- List of ordinances of the Australian Capital Territory from 2006

==== 2010-2019 ====
- List of ordinances of the Australian Capital Territory from 2014
- List of ordinances of the Australian Capital Territory from 2015
- List of ordinances of the Australian Capital Territory from 2018

==== 2020- ====
- List of ordinances of the Australian Capital Territory from 2022
- List of ordinances of the Australian Capital Territory from 2025

== Acts ==
Acts of the Legislative Assembly pursuant to the Australian Capital Territory (Self-Government) Act 1988 (Cth).

=== 20th century ===
==== 1980-1989 ====
- List of acts of the Legislative Assembly of the Australian Capital Territory from 1989

==== 1990-1999 ====
- List of acts of the Legislative Assembly of the Australian Capital Territory from 1990
- List of acts of the Legislative Assembly of the Australian Capital Territory from 1991
- List of acts of the Legislative Assembly of the Australian Capital Territory from 1992
- List of acts of the Legislative Assembly of the Australian Capital Territory from 1993
- List of acts of the Legislative Assembly of the Australian Capital Territory from 1994
- List of acts of the Legislative Assembly of the Australian Capital Territory from 1995
- List of acts of the Legislative Assembly of the Australian Capital Territory from 1996
- List of acts of the Legislative Assembly of the Australian Capital Territory from 1997
- List of acts of the Legislative Assembly of the Australian Capital Territory from 1998
- List of acts of the Legislative Assembly of the Australian Capital Territory from 1999

=== 21st century ===
==== 2000-2009 ====
- List of acts of the Legislative Assembly of the Australian Capital Territory from 2000
- List of acts of the Legislative Assembly of the Australian Capital Territory from 2001
- List of acts of the Legislative Assembly of the Australian Capital Territory from 2002
- List of acts of the Legislative Assembly of the Australian Capital Territory from 2003
- List of acts of the Legislative Assembly of the Australian Capital Territory from 2004
- List of acts of the Legislative Assembly of the Australian Capital Territory from 2005
- List of acts of the Legislative Assembly of the Australian Capital Territory from 2006
- List of acts of the Legislative Assembly of the Australian Capital Territory from 2007
- List of acts of the Legislative Assembly of the Australian Capital Territory from 2008
- List of acts of the Legislative Assembly of the Australian Capital Territory from 2009

==== 2010-2019 ====
- List of acts of the Legislative Assembly of the Australian Capital Territory from 2010
- List of acts of the Legislative Assembly of the Australian Capital Territory from 2011
- List of acts of the Legislative Assembly of the Australian Capital Territory from 2012
- List of acts of the Legislative Assembly of the Australian Capital Territory from 2013
- List of acts of the Legislative Assembly of the Australian Capital Territory from 2014
- List of acts of the Legislative Assembly of the Australian Capital Territory from 2015
- List of acts of the Legislative Assembly of the Australian Capital Territory from 2016
- List of acts of the Legislative Assembly of the Australian Capital Territory from 2017
- List of acts of the Legislative Assembly of the Australian Capital Territory from 2018
- List of acts of the Legislative Assembly of the Australian Capital Territory from 2019

==== 2020- ====
- List of acts of the Legislative Assembly of the Australian Capital Territory from 2020
- List of acts of the Legislative Assembly of the Australian Capital Territory from 2021
- List of acts of the Legislative Assembly of the Australian Capital Territory from 2022
- List of acts of the Legislative Assembly of the Australian Capital Territory from 2023
- List of acts of the Legislative Assembly of the Australian Capital Territory from 2024
- List of acts of the Legislative Assembly of the Australian Capital Territory from 2025
- List of acts of the Legislative Assembly of the Australian Capital Territory from 2026

== See also ==
- Australian Capital Territory House of Assembly
- Australian Capital Territory Legislative Assembly
