= List of ordinances of the Australian Capital Territory from 1921 =

This is a list of ordinances enacted by the Governor-General of Australia for the Territory for the Seat of Government (Australian Capital Territory) for the year 1921.

== 1921 ==
Short title, or popular name	Citation	Notified
Long title
Stock Ordinance 1921 (repealed)	No. 1 of 1921	10 February 1921
An Ordinance relating to Stock. (Repealed by Stock Ordinance 1934 (No. 9))
Noxious Weeds Ordinance 1921 or the Noxious Weeds Act 1921 (repealed)	No. 2 of 1921	29 September 1921
An Ordinance relating to the Eradication of Noxious Weeds. (Repealed by Land (Planning and Environment) (Amendment) Act 1997 (No. 7))
City Leases Ordinance 1921 (repealed)	No. 3 of 1921	20 October 1921
An Ordinance relating to the Leasing of Commonwealth Lands in the City Area of the Territory. (Repealed by City Area Leases Ordinance 1924 (No. 8))

== Sources ==
- "legislation.act.gov.au".
