= List of ordinances of the Australian Capital Territory from 2018 =

This is a list of ordinances enacted by the Governor-General of Australia for the Australian Capital Territory for the year 2018.

== 2018 ==
| Short title, or popular name | Citation | Notified |
Long title
| Australian Capital Territory National Land Amendment (Lakes) Ordinance 2018 (Note: This is a reserved law and cannot be amended or repealed by the Legislative Assembly of the Australian Capital Territory.) (repealed) | No. 1 of 2018 | 26 November 2018 |
(Repealed by Legislative Instruments Act 2003 (No. 139 (Cth)))

== Sources ==
- "legislation.act.gov.au".
