= List of ordinances of the Australian Capital Territory from 1934 =

This is a list of ordinances enacted by the Governor-General of Australia for the Territory for the Seat of Government (Australian Capital Territory) for the year 1934.

== 1934 ==
Short title, or popular name	Citation	Notified
Long title
Sheriff Ordinance Repeal Ordinance 1934 (repealed)	No. 1 of 1934	8 February 1934
An Ordinance to Repeal the Sheriff Ordinance 1932. (Note: Sheriff Ordinance 1932 (No. 23)) (Repealed by Ordinances Revision Ordinance 1937 (No. 27))
Administration and Probate Ordinance 1934 or the Administration and Probate Act 1934 (repealed)	No. 2 of 1934	8 February 1934
An Ordinance to Amend the Administration and Probate Ordinance 1929-1933. (Note: Administration and Probate Ordinance 1929 (No. 18)) (Repealed by Statute Law Amendment Act 2000 (No. 80))
Liquor (Renewal of Licences) Ordinance 1934 (repealed)	No. 3 of 1934	8 February 1934
An Ordinance relating to the renewal of licences granted under the Liquor Ordinance 1929-1932 (Note: Liquor Ordinance 1929 (No. 15)) and for other purposes. (Repealed by Ordinances Revision Ordinance 1937 (No. 27))
Oaths Ordinance 1934 (repealed)	No. 4 of 1934	15 February 1934
An Ordinance to amend the Oaths Act, 1900, (Note: Oaths Act 1900 (NSW)) of the State of New South Wales in its application to the Territory and for other purposes. (Repealed by Oaths and Affirmations Ordinance 1984 (No. 79))
Dogs Registration Ordinance 1934 (repealed)	No. 5 of 1934	1 March 1934
An Ordinance to amend the Dogs Registration Ordinance 1926-1933. (Note: Dogs Registration Ordinance 1926 (No. 1)) (Repealed by Dog Control Ordinance 1975 (No. 18))
Administration and Probate Ordinance (No. 2) 1934 or the Administration and Probate Act (No. 2) 1934 (repealed)	No. 6 of 1934	22 March 1934
An Ordinance to amend the Administration and Probate Ordinance 1929-1934. (Repealed by Statute Law Amendment Act 2000 (No. 80))
Advisory Council Ordinance 1934 (repealed)	No. 7 of 1934	5 April 1934
An Ordinance relating to the Term of Office of Elected Members of the Advisory Council. (Repealed by Advisory Council Ordinance (No. 2) 1934 (No. 19))
Sheriff Ordinance 1934 (Note: This is a reserved law and cannot be amended or repealed by the Legislative Assembly of the Australian Capital Territory.) (repealed)	No. 8 of 1934	5 April 1934
An Ordinance to provide for the Appointment of Officers to assist the Sheriff, and for other purposes. (Repealed by ACT Supreme Court (Transfer) Act 1992 (No. 49 (Cth)))
Stock Ordinance 1934 or the Stock Act 1934 (repealed)	No. 9 of 1934	12 April 1934
An Ordinance relating to Stock. (Repealed by Stock Act 1991 (No. 10))
Police Offences Ordinance 1934 or the Police Offences Act 1934 (repealed)	No. 10 of 1934	3 May 1934
An Ordinance to amend the Police Offences Ordinance 1930. (Note: Police Offences Ordinance 1930 (No. 9)) (Repealed by Law Reform (Abolitions and Repeals) Act 1996 (No. 1))
Salvation Army Property Trust Ordinance 1934 or the Salvation Army Property Trust Act 1934	No. 11 of 1934	3 May 1934
An Ordinance to provide for the Temporal Affairs of The Salvation Army in the Territory for the Seat of Government.
Police Superannuation Ordinance 1934 (repealed)	No. 12 of 1934	10 May 1934
An Ordinance to amend the Police Superannuation Ordinance 1928. (Note: Police Superannuation Ordinance 1928 (No. 16)) (Repealed by Police Pensions Ordinance 1958 (No. 1))
Trustee Ordinance 1934 (repealed)	No. 13 of 1934	17 May 1934
An Ordinance to amend the Trustee Act, 1898 (Note: Trustee Act 1898 (No. 4 (NSW))) of the State of New South Wales in its application to the Territory. (Repealed by Trustee Ordinance 1957 (No. 14))
Real Property Ordinance 1934 or the Real Property Act 1934 (repealed)	No. 14 of 1934	17 May 1934
An Ordinance to amend the Real Property Ordinance 1925-1933. (Note: Real Property Ordinance 1925 (No. 1)) (Repealed by Statute Law Amendment Act 2000 (No. 80))
Hawkers Ordinance 1934 (repealed)	No. 15 of 1934	17 May 1934
An Ordinance to amend the Hawkers Ordinance 1926. (Note: Hawkers Ordinance 1926 (No. 13)) (Repealed by Hawkers Ordinance 1936 (No. 43))
Hospital Tax Ordinance 1934 (repealed)	No. 16 of 1934	31 May 1934
An Ordinance to amend the Hospital Tax Ordinances 1933. (Note: Hospital Tax Ordinance 1933 (No. 2)) (Repealed by Hospital Tax Ordinance 1935 (No. 13))
Court of Petty Sessions Ordinance 1934 or the Court of Petty Sessions Act 1934 (repealed)	No. 17 of 1934	19 July 1934
An Ordinance to amend the Court of Petty Sessions Ordinance 1930-1932. (Note: Court of Petty Sessions Ordinance (No. 2) 1930 (No. 21)) (Repealed by Statute Law Amendment Act 2000 (No. 80))
Companies (Investigation of Affairs) Ordinance 1934 (repealed)	No. 18 of 1934	8 August 1934
An Ordinance to provide for the Investigation of the Affairs of Companies. (Repealed by Companies Ordinance 1954 (No. 14))
Advisory Council Ordinance (No. 2) 1934 (repealed)	No. 19 of 1934	16 August 1934
An Ordinance relating to the Term of Office of elected members of the Advisory Council. (Repealed by Advisory Council Ordinance 1935 (No. 2))
City Area Leases Ordinance 1934 (repealed)	No. 20 of 1934	23 August 1934
An Ordinance to amend the City Area Leases Ordinance 1924-1929. (Note: City Area Leases Ordinance 1924 (No. 8)) (Repealed by City Area Leases Ordinance 1936 (No. 31))
Plant Diseases Ordinance 1934 or the Plant Diseases Act 1934 (repealed)	No. 21 of 1934	6 September 1934
An Ordinance relating to Diseases and Pests affecting Plants. (Repealed by Plant Diseases Act 2002 (No. 42))
Police Superannuation Ordinance (No. 2) 1934 (repealed)	No. 22 of 1934	27 September 1934
An Ordinance to amend the Police Superannuation Ordinance 1928-1934. (Repealed by Police Pensions Ordinance 1958 (No. 1))
Police Ordinance 1934 or the Police Act 1934 (repealed)	No. 23 of 1934	1 November 1934
An Ordinance to amend the Police Ordinance 1927-1932. (Note: Police Ordinance 1927 (No. 19)) (Repealed by Crimes (Amendment) Act (No. 2) 1994 (No. 75))
Building and Services Ordinance 1934 or the Building and Services Act 1934 (repealed)	No. 24 of 1934	8 November 1934
An Ordinance to amend the Building and Services Ordinance 1924-1928. (Note: Building and Services Ordinance 1924 (No. 9)) (Repealed by Statute Law Amendment Act 2000 (No. 80))
Companies (Receiver and Manager) Ordinance 1934 (repealed)	No. 25 of 1934	13 December 1934
An Ordinance to provide for the appointment of Receivers and Managers, and the protection of the assets, of certain Companies. (Repealed by Companies Ordinance 1954 (No. 14))
Matrimonial Causes Ordinance 1934 (repealed)	No. 26 of 1934	20 December 1934
An Ordinance to amend the Matrimonial Causes Act, 1899, (Note: Matrimonial Causes Act 1899 (No. 14 (NSW))) of the State of New South Wales, as amended by the Matrimonial Causes (Amendment) Act, 1929, (Note: Matrimonial Causes (Amendment) Act 1929 (No. 5 (NSW))) of that State, in its application to the Territory, as amended for the time being by Ordinance. (Repealed by Ordinances Revision Ordinance 1977 (No. 65))

== Sources ==
- "legislation.act.gov.au".
