= List of ordinances of the Australian Capital Territory from 1918 =

This is a list of ordinances enacted by the Governor-General of Australia for the Territory for the Seat of Government (Australian Capital Territory) for the year 1918.

== 1918 ==
Short title, or popular name	Citation	Notified
Long title
Animals and Birds Protection Ordinance 1918 (repealed)	No. 1 of 1918	15 August 1918
An Ordinance for the Protection of Animals and Birds. (Repealed by Nature Conservation Ordinance 1980 (No. 20))
Leases Ordinance 1918 or the Leases Act 1918 (repealed)	No. 2 of 1918	4 July 1914
An Ordinance relating to the Leasing of Commonwealth Lands in the Territory. (Repealed by Land (Planning and Environment) (Consequential Provisions) Act 1991 (No. 118))

== Sources ==
- "legislation.act.gov.au".
