= List of ordinances of the Australian Capital Territory from 2001 =

This is a list of ordinances enacted by the Governor-General of Australia for the Australian Capital Territory for the year 2001.

== 2001 ==
Short title, or popular name	Citation	Notified
Long title
Reserved Laws (Administration) Amendment Ordinance 2001 (No. 1) (Note: This is a reserved law and cannot be amended or repealed by the Legislative Assembly of the Australian Capital Territory.) (repealed)	No. 1 of 2001	5 July 2001
An Ordinance to amend the Reserved Laws (Administration) Ordinance 1989. (Note: Reserved Laws (Administration) Ordinance 1989 (No. 42)) (Repealed by Infrastructure and Regional Development (Spent and Redundant Instruments) Repeal Regulation 2014 (Cth))
Unlawful Assemblies Repeal Ordinance 2001 (repealed)	No. 2 of 2001	5 July 2001
An Ordinance to repeal the Unlawful Assemblies Ordinance 1937. (Note: Unlawful Assemblies Ordinance 1937 (No. 9)) (Repealed by Legislation Act 2003 (No. 139 (Cth)))

== Sources ==
- "legislation.act.gov.au".
