= List of ordinances of the Australian Capital Territory from 2006 =

This is a list of ordinances enacted by the Governor-General of Australia for the Australian Capital Territory for the year 2006.

== 2006 ==
Short title, or popular name	Citation	Notified
Long title
Companies Ordinances Repeal Ordinance 2006 (Note: This is a reserved law and cannot be amended or repealed by the Legislative Assembly of the Australian Capital Territory.) (repealed)	No. 1 of 2006	17 February 2006
An Ordinance to repeal a number of companies Ordinances. (Repealed by Infrastructure and Regional Development (Spent and Redundant Instruments) Repeal Regulation 2014 (Cth))

== Sources ==
- "legislation.act.gov.au".
