= List of ordinances of the Australian Capital Territory from 1994 =

This is a list of ordinances enacted by the Governor-General of Australia for the Australian Capital Territory for the year 1994.

== 1994 ==
Short title, or popular name	Citation	Notified
Long title
Classification of Publications (Amendment) Ordinance 1994 (Note: This is a reserved law and cannot be amended or repealed by the Legislative Assembly of the Australian Capital Territory.) (repealed)	No. 1 of 1994	23 February 1994
An Ordinance to amend the Classification of Publications Ordinance 1983. (Note: Classification of Publications Ordinance 1983 (No. 59)) (Repealed by Classification (Publications, Films and Computer Games) Act 1995 (No. 7 (Cth)))
National Land (Parking) Ordinance 1994 (repealed)	No. 2 of 1994	2 March 1994
An Ordinance to make provision for the parking of vehicles on national land. (Repealed by National Land (Parking) Repeal Ordinance 2014 (No. 1))
National Land (Parking) (Consequential Amendments) Ordinance 1994 (repealed)	No. 3 of 1994	2 March 1994
An Ordinance to amend certain Ordinances in consequence of the National Land (Parking) Ordinance 1994. (Note: National Land (Parking) Ordinance 1994 (No. 2)) (Repealed by National Land (Parking) Repeal Ordinance 2014 (No. 1))
Classification of Publications (Amendment) Ordinance (No. 2) 1994 (repealed)	No. 4 of 1994	6 April 1994
An Ordinance to amend the Classification of Publications Ordinance 1983. (Repealed by Classification (Publications, Films and Computer Games) Act 1995 (No. 7 (Cth)))
Classification of Publications (Amendment) Ordinance (No. 3) 1994 (repealed)	No. 5 of 1994	22 June 1994
An Ordinance to amend the Classification of Publications Ordinance 1983. (Repealed by Classification (Publications, Films and Computer Games) Act 1995 (No. 7 (Cth)))
Reserved Laws (Administration) (Amendment and Repeal) Ordinance 1994 (repealed)	No. 6 of 1994	24 August 1994
An Ordinance to amend the Reserved Laws (Administration) Ordinance 1989 (Note: Reserved Laws (Administration) Ordinance 1989 (No. 42)) and to repeal the Evidence (Closed Circuit Television) (Amendment) Ordinance 1990. (Note: Evidence (Closed Circuit Television) (Amendment) Ordinance 1990 (No. 6)) (Repealed by Infrastructure and Regional Development (Spent and Redundant Instruments) Repeal Regulation 2014 (Cth))
Supreme Court (Arbitration) (Repeal) Ordinance 1994	No. 7 of 1994	24 August 1994
An Ordinance to repeal the Supreme Court (Arbitration) Ordinance 1990. (Note: Supreme Court (Arbitration) Ordinance 1990 (No. 8))

== Sources ==
- "legislation.act.gov.au".
