= List of ordinances of the Australian Capital Territory from 1993 =

This is a list of ordinances enacted by the Governor-General of Australia for the Australian Capital Territory for the year 1993.

== 1993 ==
Short title, or popular name	Citation	Notified
Long title
Classification of Publications (Amendment) Ordinance 1993 (Note: This is a reserved law and cannot be amended or repealed by the Legislative Assembly of the Australian Capital Territory.) (repealed)	No. 1 of 1993	17 February 1993
An Ordinance to amend the Classification of Publications Ordinance 1983. (Note: Classification of Publications Ordinance 1983 (No. 59)) (Repealed by Classification (Publications, Films and Computer Games) Act 1995 (No. 7 (Cth)))
National Land (Amendment) Ordinance 1993 (repealed)	No. 2 of 1993	24 November 1993
An Ordinance to amend the National Land Ordinance 1989. (Note: National Land Ordinance 1989 (No. 39)) (Repealed by Infrastructure and Regional Development (Spent and Redundant Instruments) Repeal Regulation 2014 (Cth))
Reserved Laws (Administration) (Amendment) Ordinance 1993 (repealed)	No. 3 of 1993	24 November 1993
An Ordinance to amend the Reserved Laws (Administration) Ordinance 1989. (Note: Reserved Laws (Administration) Ordinance 1989 (No. 42)) (Repealed by Infrastructure and Regional Development (Spent and Redundant Instruments) Repeal Regulation 2014 (Cth))

== Sources ==
- "legislation.act.gov.au".
