= List of ordinances of the Australian Capital Territory from 1960 =

This is a list of ordinances enacted by the Governor-General of Australia for the Australian Capital Territory for the year 1960.

== 1960 ==
Short title, or popular name	Citation	Notified
Long title
Amendments Incorporation Ordinance 1960 or the Amendments Incorporation Act 1960 (repealed)	No. 1 of 1960	28 January 1960
An Ordinance to amend the Amendments Incorporation Ordinance 1929-1939. (Note: Amendments Incorporation Ordinance 1929 (No. 6)) (Repealed by Law Reform (Repeal of Laws) Act 1997 (No. 42))
Fire Brigades Ordinance 1960 or the Fire Brigades Act 1960 (repealed)	No. 2 of 1960	30 June 1960
An Ordinance to amend the Fire Brigades Ordinance 1957-1958. (Note: Fire Brigades Ordinance 1957 (No. 20)) (Repealed by Statute Law Amendment Act 2000 (No. 80))
Police Ordinance 1960 or the Police Act 1960 (repealed)	No. 3 of 1960	30 June 1960
An Ordinance to amend the Police Ordinance 1927-1958. (Note: Police Ordinance 1927 (No. 19)) (Repealed by Crimes (Amendment) Act (No. 2) 1994 (No. 75))
Canberra University College Ordinance 1960 (repealed)	No. 4 of 1960	30 June 1960
An Ordinance relating to Membership of the Council of the Canberra University College. (Repealed by Ordinances Revision Ordinance 1978 (No. 46))
Soil Conservation Ordinance 1960 or the Soil Conservation Act 1960 (repealed)	No. 5 of 1960	11 August 1960
An Ordinance for Conserving Soil Resources. (Repealed by Land (Planning and Environment) (Amendment) Act (No. 2) 1995 (No. 21))
Administration and Probate Ordinance 1960 or the Administration and Probate Act 1960 (repealed)	No. 6 of 1960	9 September 1960
An Ordinance to amend the Administration and Probate Ordinance 1929-1953. (Note: Administration and Probate Ordinance 1929 (No. 18)) (Repealed by Statute Law Amendment Act 2000 (No. 80))
Trustee Companies Ordinance 1960 or the Trustee Companies Act 1960 (repealed)	No. 7 of 1960	22 September 1960
An Ordinance to amend the Trustee Companies Ordinance 1947-1954. (Note: Trustee Companies Ordinance 1947 (No. 15)) (Repealed by Statute Law Amendment Act 2000 (No. 80))
Nurses Registration Ordinance 1960 (repealed)	No. 8 of 1960	22 September 1960
An Ordinance to amend the Nurses Registration Ordinance 1933-1959. (Note: Nurses Registration Ordinance 1933 (No. 1)) (Repealed by Nurses Ordinance 1988 (No. 61))
Police Pensions Ordinance 1960 (Note: This is a reserved law and cannot be amended or repealed by the Legislative Assembly of the Australian Capital Territory.)	No. 9 of 1960	3 November 1960
An Ordinance to amend the Police Pensions Ordinance 1958. (Note: Police Pensions Ordinance 1958 (No. 1))
Returned Servicemen's Badges Ordinance 1960 or the Returned Servicemen's Badges Act 1960 (repealed)	No. 10 of 1960	24 November 1960
An Ordinance to prohibit the Unauthorized Wearing of Membership Badges issued by the Returned Sailors', Soldiers' and Airmen's Imperial League of Australia. (Repealed by Law Reform (Abolitions and Repeals) Act 1996 (No. 1))
Motor Traffic Ordinance 1960 or the Motor Traffic Act 1960 (repealed)	No. 11 of 1960	19 December 1960
An Ordinance to amend the Motor Traffic Ordinance 1936-1959. (Note: Motor Traffic Ordinance 1936 (No. 45)) (Repealed by Road Transport Legislation Amendment Act 1999 (No. 79))
Traffic Ordinance 1960 or the Traffic Act 1960 (repealed)	No. 12 of 1960	19 December 1960
An Ordinance to amend the Traffic Ordinance 1937-1955. (Note: Traffic Ordinance 1937 (No. 32)) (Repealed by Road Transport Legislation Amendment Act 1999 (No. 79))

== Sources ==
- "legislation.act.gov.au".
