= List of acts of the Legislative Assembly of the Australian Capital Territory from 2026 =

This is a list of acts of the Legislative Assembly of the Australian Capital Territory for the year 2026.

== 2026 ==
Short title, or popular name	Citation	Notified
Long title
Government Procurement Amendment Act 2026	A2026-1	16 February 2026
An Act to amend the Government Procurement Act 2001 (Note: Government Procurement Act 2001 (No. 28)) and the Government Procurement Regulation 2007.
Building and Construction Legislation Amendment Act 2026	A2026-2	16 February 2026
An Act to amend legislation about building and construction, and for other purposes.
Territory Records (Executive Records) Amendment Act 2026	A2026-3	16 February 2026
An Act to amend the Territory Records Act 2002, (Note: Territory Records Act 2002 (No. 18)) and for other purposes.
Justice and Community Safety Legislation Amendment Act 2026	A2026-4	16 February 2026
An Act to amend legislation about justice and community safety, and for other purposes.
Nurse Practitioners Legislation Amendment Act 2026	A2026-5	5 March 2026
An Act to amend legislation about nurse practitioners, and for other purposes.
Crimes Legislation Amendment Act 2026	A2026-6	2 April 2026
An Act to amend legislation about crimes, and for other purposes.
Civil Law (Wrongs) Amendment Act 2026	A2026-7	15 May 2026
An Act to amend the Civil Law (Wrongs) Act 2002, (Note: Civil Law (Wrongs) Act 2002 (No. 40)) and for other purposes.
Planning Legislation Amendment Act 2026	A2026-8	15 May 2026
An Act to amend legislation about planning, and for other purposes.
Juries (Peremptory Challenges) Amendment Act 2026	A2026-9	15 May 2026
An Act to amend the Juries Act 1967. (Note: Juries Ordinance 1967 (No. 47))
Fuel Legislation Amendment Act 2026	A2026-10	15 May 2026
An Act to amend legislation about fuels, and for other purposes.
City and Environment Legislation Amendment Act 2026	A2026-11	5 June 2026
An Act to amend legislation about the city and environment, and for other purposes.
Justice and Community Safety Legislation Amendment Act 2026 (No 2)	A2026-12	19 June 2026
An Act to amend legislation about justice and community safety, and for other purposes.

== Sources ==
- "legislation.act.gov.au".
