= List of ordinances of the Australian Capital Territory from 1992 =

This is a list of ordinances enacted by the Governor-General of Australia for the Australian Capital Territory for the year 1992.

== 1992 ==
Short title, or popular name	Citation	Notified
Long title
Lakes (Amendment) Ordinance 1992 (Note: This is a reserved law and cannot be amended or repealed by the Legislative Assembly of the Australian Capital Territory.) (repealed)	No. 1 of 1992	11 March 1992
An Ordinance to amend the Lakes Ordinance 1976. (Note: Lakes Ordinance 1976 (No. 65)) (Repealed by Australian Capital Territory National Land Amendment (Lakes) Ordinance 2018 (No. 1))
Classification of Publications (Amendment) Ordinance 1992 (repealed)	No. 2 of 1992	23 December 1992
An Ordinance to amend the Classification of Publications Ordinance 1983. (Note: Classification of Publications Ordinance 1983 (No. 59)) (Repealed by Classification (Publications, Films and Computer Games) Act 1995 (No. 7 (Cth)))

== Sources ==
- "legislation.act.gov.au".
