= List of ordinances of the Australian Capital Territory from 1930 =

This is a list of ordinances enacted by the Governor-General of Australia for the Territory for the Seat of Government (Australian Capital Territory) for the year 1930.

== 1930 ==
Short title, or popular name	Citation	Notified
Long title
Mining Ordinance 1930 or the Mining Act 1930 (repealed)	No. 1 of 1930	18 February 1930
An Ordinance relating to Mining. (Repealed by Land (Planning and Environment) (Amendment) Act (No. 2) 1995 (No. 21))
Church Lands Leases Ordinance 1930 or the Church Lands Leases Act 1930 (repealed)	No. 2 of 1930	20 March 1930
An Ordinance to amend the Church Lands Leases Ordinance 1924-1927. (Note: Church Lands Leases Ordinance 1924 (No. 10)) (Repealed by Land (Planning and Environment) (Consequential Provisions) Act 1991 (No. 118))
Recovery of Lands Ordinance 1930 or the Recovery of Lands Act 1930 (repealed)	No. 3 of 1930	27 March 1930
An Ordinance to amend the Recovery of Lands Ordinance 1929. (Note: Recovery of Lands Ordinance 1929 (No. 1)) (Repealed by Statute Law Amendment Act 2000 (No. 80))
Advisory Council Ordinance 1930 (repealed)	No. 4 of 1930	10 April 1930
An Ordinance relating to the Establishment of an Advisory Council. (Repealed by Advisory Council Ordinance 1936 (No. 49))
Seat of Government (Administration) Ordinance 1930 (repealed)	No. 5 of 1930	1 May 1930
An Ordinance relating to the Administration of the Territory for the Seat of Government. (Repealed by Seat of Government (Administration) (Repeal) Ordinance 1989 (No. 43))
Liquor Ordinance 1930 (repealed)	No. 6 of 1930	22 May 1930
An Ordinance to amend the Liquor Ordinance 1929. (Note: Liquor Ordinance 1929 (No. 15)) (Repealed by Liquor Ordinance 1975 (No. 19))
Bills of Sale Ordinance 1930 (repealed)	No. 7 of 1930	12 June 1930
An Ordinance to amend the Bills of Sale Act of 1898 (Note: Bills of Sale Act 1898 (No. 10 (NSW))) of the State of New South Wales in its application to the Territory. (Repealed by Instruments Ordinance 1933 (No. 25))
Leases (Special Purposes) Ordinance 1930 or the Leases (Special Purposes) Act 1930 (repealed)	No. 8 of 1930	26 June 1930
An Ordinance to amend the Leases (Special Purposes) Ordinance 1925-1929. (Note: Leases (Special Purposes) Ordinance 1925 (No. 11)) (Repealed by Land (Planning and Environment) (Consequential Provisions) Act 1991 (No. 118))
Police Offences Ordinance 1930 or the Police Offences Act 1930 (repealed)	No. 9 of 1930	25 July 1930
An Ordinance relating to Police Offences. (Repealed by Law Reform (Abolitions and Repeals) Act 1996 (No. 1))
Court of Petty Sessions Ordinance 1930 (repealed)	No. 10 of 1930	25 July 1930
An Ordinance to establish a Court of Petty Sessions, to provide for the appointment of Magistrates, and for other purposes. (Repealed by Court of Petty Sessions Ordinance (No. 2) 1930 (No. 21))
Administration and Probate Ordinance 1930 or the Administration and Probate Act 1930 (repealed)	No. 11 of 1930	25 July 1930
An Ordinance to amend the Administration and Probate Ordinance 1929. (Note: Administration and Probate Ordinance 1929 (No. 18)) (Repealed by Statute Law Amendment Act 2000 (No. 80))
Housing Ordinance 1930 (repealed)	No. 12 of 1930	31 July 1930
An Ordinance to amend the Housing Ordinances 1928. (Note: Housing Ordinance 1928 (No. 11)) (Repealed by Self-Government (Consequential Amendments) Ordinance 1989 (No. 38))
Medical Practitioners Registration Ordinance 1930 or the Medical Practitioners Registration Act 1930 or the Medical Practitioners Act 1930 (repealed)	No. 13 of 1930	7 August 1930
An Ordinance to provide for the Registration of Persons engaged in Medical Practice. (Repealed by Health Professionals Act 2004 (No. 38))
Police Ordinance 1930 or the Police Act 1930 (repealed)	No. 14 of 1930	7 August 1930
An Ordinance to amend the Police Ordinance 1927. (Note: Police Ordinance 1927 (No. 19)) (Repealed by Crimes (Amendment) Act (No. 2) 1994 (No. 75))
Land Advisory Board Ordinance 1930 (repealed)	No. 15 of 1930	14 August 1930
An Ordinance relating to the Establishment of a Land Advisory Board. (Repealed by Land Commissioner Ordinance 1933 (No. 14))
Education Ordinance 1930 (repealed)	No. 16 of 1930	18 September 1930
An Ordinance to amend the Education Ordinance 1928. (Note: Education Ordinance 1928 (No. 20)) (Repealed by Education Ordinance 1937 (No. 25))
Bank Holidays Ordinance 1930 (repealed)	No. 17 of 1930	11 September 1930
An Ordinance to amend the Bank Holidays Ordinance 1927. (Note: Bank Holidays Ordinance 1927 (No. 8)) (Repealed by Bank Holidays Ordinance 1952 (No. 3))
Public Health Ordinance 1930 or the Public Health Act 1930 (repealed)	No. 18 of 1930	16 October 1930
An Ordinance to amend the Public Health Ordinance 1928, (Note: Public Health Ordinance 1928 (No. 21)) and for other purposes. (Repealed by Public Health Act 1997 (No. 69))
Real Property Ordinance 1930 or the Real Property Act 1930 (repealed)	No. 19 of 1930	16 October 1930
An Ordinance to amend the Real Property Ordinance 1925-1927. (Note: Real Property Ordinance (No. 1)) (Repealed by Statute Law Amendment Act 2000 (No. 80))
Interpretation Ordinance 1930 (repealed)	No. 20 of 1930	16 October 1930
An Ordinance to amend the Interpretation Ordinance 1914-1929. (Note: Interpretation Ordinance 1914 (No. 1)) (Repealed by Interpretation Ordinance 1937 (No. 29))
Court of Petty Sessions Ordinance (No. 2) 1930 or the Court of Petty Sessions Ordinance 1930 or the Magistrates Court Ordinance 1930 or the Magistrates Court Act 1930	No. 21 of 1930	21 November 1930
An Ordinance to establish a Court of Petty Sessions, to provide for the appointment of Magistrates, and for other purposes.
Housing Ordinance (No. 2) 1930 (repealed)	No. 22 of 1930	11 December 1930
An Ordinance to amend the Housing Ordinance 1928-1930. (Repealed by Self-Government (Consequential Amendments) Ordinance 1989 (No. 38))

== Sources ==
- "legislation.act.gov.au".
