= List of ordinances of the Australian Capital Territory from 1929 =

This is a list of ordinances enacted by the Governor-General of Australia for the Territory for the Seat of Government (Australian Capital Territory) for the year 1929.

== 1929 ==
Short title, or popular name	Citation	Notified
Long title
Recovery of Lands Ordinance 1929 or the Recovery of Lands Act 1929	No. 1 of 1929	14 February 1929
An Ordinance to provide for the Recovery of Possession of Lands upon the determination of leases.
Fish Protection Ordinance 1929 (repealed)	No. 2 of 1929	28 February 1929
An Ordinance relating to the Protection of Fish. (Repealed by Fishing Ordinance 1967 (No. 7))
Queanbeyan Lease Ordinance 1929 (repealed)	No. 3 of 1929	28 March 1929
An Ordinance relating to the Leasing of Lands to the Council of the Municipality of Queanbeyan and to authorise the execution of Agreements in connexion therewith. (Repealed by Self-Government (Consequential Amendments) Ordinance 1989 (No. 38))
Lotteries and Art Unions Ordinance 1929 (repealed)	No. 4 of 1929	28 March 1929
An Ordinance to amend the Lotteries and Art Unions Ordinance 1926. (Note: Lotteries and Art Unions Ordinance 1926 (No. 14)) (Repealed by Lotteries Ordinance 1964 (No. 13))
Rates Ordinance 1929 or the Rates Act 1929 (repealed)	No. 5 of 1929	18 April 1929
An Ordinance to amend the Rates Ordinance 1926. (Note: Rates Ordinance 1926 (No. 6)) (Repealed by Statute Law Amendment Act 2000 (No. 80))
Amendments Incorporation Ordinance 1929 or the Amendments Incorporation Act 1929 (repealed)	No. 6 of 1929	2 May 1929
An Ordinance for incorporating amendments in amended Ordinances and Regulations. (Repealed by Legislation (Republication) Act 1996 (No. 51))
Interpretation Ordinance 1929 (repealed)	No. 7 of 1929	30 May 1929
An Ordinance to amend the Interpretation Ordinance 1914-1927. (Note: Interpretation Ordinance 1914 (No. 1)) (Repealed by Interpretation Ordinance 1937 (No. 29))
Meat Ordinance 1929 (repealed)	No. 8 of 1929	30 May 1929
An Ordinance to amend the Meat Ordinance 1920-1927. (Note: Meat Ordinance 1920 (No. 1)) (Repealed by Meat Ordinance 1931 (No. 13))
Weights and Measures Ordinance 1929 or the Weights and Measures Act 1929 or the Weights and Measures (Sale of Bread) Act 1929 (repealed)	No. 9 of 1929	6 June 1929
An Ordinance relating to Weights and Measures and for other purposes. (Repealed by Trade Measurement (Amendment) Act 1995 (No. 5))
Federal Capital Commission's Arms Ordinance 1929 (repealed)	No. 10 of 1929	6 June 1929
An Ordinance for the Protection of the Arms of Federal Capital Commissioners Australia and the City of Canberra. (Repealed by City of Canberra Arms Ordinance 1932 (No. 3))
Statistics Ordinance 1929 (repealed)	No. 11 of 1929	13 June 1929
An Ordinance relating to the Collection and Compilation of Statistics concerning the Territory for the Seat of Government. (Repealed by Statistics (Repeal) Ordinance 1985 (No. 48))
Rates Ordinance (No. 2) 1929 or the Rates Act (No. 2) 1929 (repealed)	No. 12 of 1929	18 June 1929
An Ordinance to amend the Rates Ordinance 1926-1929 and for Other Purposes. (Repealed by Statute Law Amendment Act 2000 (No. 80))
City Area Leases Ordinance 1929 (repealed)	No. 13 of 1929	18 June 1929
An Ordinance to amend the City Area Leases Ordinance 1924-1926. (Note: City Area Leases Ordinance 1924 (No. 6)) (Repealed by City Area Leases Ordinance 1936 (No. 31))
Leases (Special Purposes) Ordinance 1929 or the Leases (Special Purposes) Act 1929 (repealed)	No. 14 of 1929	18 June 1929
An Ordinance to amend the Leases (Special Purposes) Ordinance 1925-1927. (Note: Leases (Special Purposes) Ordinance 1925 (No. 11)) (Repealed by Land (Planning and Environment) (Consequential Provisions) Act 1991 (No. 118))
Liquor Ordinance 1929 (repealed)	No. 15 of 1929	4 July 1929
An Ordinance relating to the Sale, Supply and Disposal of Liquor and for other Purposes. (Repealed by Liquor Ordinance 1975 (No. 19))
Registration of Births, Deaths and Marriages Ordinance 1929 (repealed)	No. 16 of 1929	9 August 1929
An Ordinance relating to the Registration of Births, Deaths and Marriages and for other purposes. (Repealed by Registration of Births, Deaths and Marriages Ordinance 1963 (No. 17))
Rates Ordinance (No. 3) 1929 or the Rates Act (No. 3) 1929 (repealed)	No. 17 of 1929	9 August 1929
An Ordinance to amend the Rates Ordinance 1926-1929. (Repealed by Statute Law Amendment Act 2000 (No. 80))
Administration and Probate Ordinance 1929 or the Administration and Probate Act 1929	No. 18 of 1929	10 October 1929
An Ordinance relating to the Administration of the Estates of Deceased Persons.
Registration of Births, Deaths and Marriages Ordinance (No. 2) 1929 (repealed)	No. 19 of 1929	5 December 1929
An Ordinance to amend the Registration of Births, Deaths and Marriages Ordinance 1929. (Note: Registration of Births, Deaths and Marriages Ordinance 1929 (No. 16)) (Repealed by Registration of Births, Deaths and Marriages Ordinance 1963 (No. 17))
Canberra University College Ordinance 1929 (repealed)	No. 20 of 1929	19 December 1929
An Ordinance to provide for the establishment of a University College and for other purposes. (Repealed by Canberra University College Ordinance 1953 (No. 8))
Marriage Ordinance 1929 (repealed)	No. 21 of 1929	19 December 1929
An Ordinance relating to Marriage. (Repealed by Ordinances Revision Ordinance 1977 (No. 65))
Theatres and Public Halls Ordinance 1929 or the Theatres and Public Halls Act 1929 (repealed)	No. 22 of 1929	19 December 1929
An Ordinance to amend the Theatres and Public Halls Ordinance 1928. (Note: Theatres and Public Halls Ordinance 1928 (No. 15)) (Repealed by Statute Law Amendment Act 2000 (No. 80))

== Sources ==
- "legislation.act.gov.au".
