= List of ordinances of the Australian Capital Territory from 1920 =

This is a list of ordinances enacted by the Governor-General of Australia for the Territory for the Seat of Government (Australian Capital Territory) for the year 1920.

== 1920 ==
Short title, or popular name	Citation	Notified
Long title
Meat Ordinance 1920 (repealed)	No. 1 of 1920	5 August 1920
An Ordinance to Control Slaughtering and the Sale of Meat. (Repealed by Meat Ordinance 1931 (No. 13))
Rates Ordinance 1920 (repealed)	No. 2 of 1920	17 December 1920
An Ordinance to amend the Rates Ordinance 1911-12. (Note: Rates Ordinance 1911 (No. 2)) (Repealed by Rates Ordinance 1926 (No. 6))
Stock Ordinance 1920 (repealed)	No. 3 of 1920	23 December 1920
An Ordinance relating to Stock. (Repealed by Stock Ordinance 1934 (No. 9))

== Sources ==
- "legislation.act.gov.au".
