= List of ordinances of the Australian Capital Territory from 1939 =

This is a list of ordinances enacted by the Governor-General of Australia for the Australian Capital Territory for the year 1939.

== 1939 ==
Short title, or popular name	Citation	Notified
Long title
Hospital Tax Ordinance 1939 (repealed)	No. 1 of 1939	23 March 1939
An Ordinance to amend the Hospital Tax Ordinance 1935-1938. (Note: Hospital Tax Ordinance 1935 (No. 13)) (Repealed by Hospital Tax Ordinance Repeal Ordinance 1946 (No. 10))
Medical Practitioners Registration Ordinance 1939 or the Medical Practitioners Registration Act 1939 (repealed)	No. 2 of 1939	4 May 1939
An Ordinance to amend the Medical Practitioners Registration Ordinance 1930-1937. (Note: Medical Practitioners Registration Ordinance 1930 (No. 13)) (Repealed by Statute Law Amendment Act 2000 (No. 80))
Canberra Community Hospital Ordinance 1939 (repealed)	No. 3 of 1939	27 April 1939
An Ordinance to amend the Canberra Community Hospital Ordinances 1938. (Note: Canberra Community Hospital Ordinance 1938 (No. 20)) (Repealed by Health Commission Ordinance 1975 (No. 16))
Stock Diseases Ordinance 1939 or the Stock Diseases Act 1939 (repealed)	No. 4 of 1939	11 May 1939
An Ordinance to amend the Stock Diseases Ordinance 1933. (Note: Stock Diseases Ordinance 1933 (No. 30)) (Repealed by Animal Diseases Act 1993 (No. 61))
Hospital Tax Ordinance (No. 2) 1939 (repealed)	No. 5 of 1939	15 June 1939
An Ordinance to amend the Hospital Tax Ordinance 1935-1939. (Note: Hospital Tax Ordinance 1935 (No. 13)) (Repealed by Hospital Tax Ordinance Repeal Ordinance 1946 (No. 10))
Trespass on Commonwealth Lands Ordinance 1939 or the Trespass on Commonwealth Lands Act 1939 (repealed)	No. 6 of 1939	10 August 1939
An Ordinance to amend the Trespass on Commonwealth Lands Ordinance 1932-1937. (Note: Trespass on Commonwealth Lands Ordinance 1932 (No. 20)) (Repealed by Statute Law Amendment Act 2000 (No. 80))
Police Offences Ordinance 1939 or the Police Offences Act 1939 (repealed)	No. 7 of 1939	24 August 1939
An Ordinance to amend the Police Offences Ordinance 1930-1937. (Note: Police Offences Ordinance 1930 (No. 9)) (Repealed by Law Reform (Abolitions and Repeals) Act 1996 (No. 1))
Seat of Government (Administration) Ordinance 1939 (repealed)	No. 8 of 1939	24 August 1939
An Ordinance to amend the Seat of Government (Administration) Ordinance 1930-1938. (Note: Seat of Government (Administration) Ordinance 1930 (No. 5)) (Repealed by Seat of Government (Administration) (Repeal) Ordinance 1989 (No. 43))
Co-operative Trading Societies Ordinance 1939 or the Co-operative Societies Ordinance 1939 or the Co-operative Societies Act 1939 (repealed)	No. 9 of 1939	31 August 1939
An Ordinance relating to Co-operative Trading Societies. (Repealed by Cooperatives Act 2002 (No. 45))
Police Offences Ordinance (No. 2) 1939 or the Police Offences Act (No. 2) 1930 (repealed)	No. 10 of 1939	21 September 1939
An Ordinance to amend the Police Offences Ordinance 1930-1937 as amended by the Police Offences Ordinance 1939. (Note: Police Offences Ordinance 1939 (No. 7)) (Repealed by Law Reform (Abolitions and Repeals) Act 1996 (No. 1))
Public Parks Ordinance 1939 or the Public Parks Act 1939 (repealed)	No. 11 of 1939	12 October 1939
An Ordinance to amend the Public Parks Ordinance 1928-1937. (Note: Public Parks Ordinance 1928 (No. 23)) (Repealed by Statute Law Amendment Act 2000 (No. 80))
Amendments Incorporation Ordinance 1939 or the Amendments Incorporation Act 1939 (repealed)	No. 12 of 1939	19 October 1939
An Ordinance to amend the Amendments Incorporation Ordinance 1929. (Note: Amendments Incorporation Ordinance 1929 (No. 6)) (Repealed by Law Reform (Repeal of Laws) Act 1997 (No. 42))
Walter Oswald Watt Memorial Fund Ordinance 1939 or the Walter Oswald Watt Memorial Fund Act 1939 (repealed)	No. 13 of 1939	9 November 1939
An Ordinance to amend the Walter Oswald Watt Memorial Fund Ordinance 1938. (Note: Walter Oswald Watt Memorial Fund Ordinance 1938 (No. 24)) (Repealed by Law Reform (Abolitions and Repeals) Act 1996 (No. 1))
Industrial Board Ordinance 1939 (repealed)	No. 14 of 1939	30 November 1939
An Ordinance to amend the Industrial Board Ordinance 1936-1938. (Note: Industrial Board Ordinance 1936 (No. 12)) (Repealed by Self-Government (Consequential Amendments) Ordinance 1989 (No. 38))
Liquor (Renewal of Licences) Ordinance 1939 (repealed)	No. 15 of 1939	23 December 1939
An Ordinance relating to the renewal of licences granted under the Liquor Ordinance 1929-1938 (Note: Liquor Ordinance 1929 (No. 15)) and for other purposes. (Repealed by Ordinances Revision Ordinance 1959 (No. 59))

== Sources ==
- "legislation.act.gov.au".
