= List of ordinances of the Australian Capital Territory from 1928 =

This is a list of ordinances enacted by the Governor-General of Australia for the Territory for the Seat of Government (Australian Capital Territory) for the year 1928.

== 1928 ==
Short title, or popular name	Citation	Notified
Long title
Provisional Government Ordinance 1928 (repealed)	No. 1 of 1928	19 January 1928
An Ordinance to amend the Provisional Government Ordinance 1911-1927 (Note: Provisional Government Ordinance 1911 (No. 1)) and for other purposes. (Repealed by Ordinances Revision Ordinance 1937 (No. 27))
Standard Time Ordinance 1928 (repealed)	No. 2 of 1928	16 February 1928
An Ordinance relating to Standard Time in the Territory for the Seat of Government. (Repealed by Standard Time and Summer Time Ordinance 1971 (No. 24))
Trespass on Commonwealth Lands Ordinance 1928 (repealed)	No. 3 of 1928	1 March 1928
An Ordinance to amend the Trespass on Commonwealth Lands Ordinance 1922-1927. (Note: Trespass on Commonwealth Lands Ordinance (No. 1)) (Repealed by Trespass on Commonwealth Lands Ordinance 1932 (No. 20))
Apiaries Ordinance 1928 or the Apiaries Act 1928 (repealed)	No. 4 of 1928	1 March 1928
An Ordinance to Regulate the Bee Industry and to Prevent the Spread of Disease in Bees. (Repealed by Animal Diseases (Amendment) Act 1997 (No. 3))
Methodist Church Property Ordinance 1928 (repealed)	No. 5 of 1928	1 March 1928
An Ordinance relating to Methodist Church Properties. (Repealed by Ordinances Revision Ordinance 1977 (No. 15))
Industrial Board Ordinance 1928 (repealed)	No. 6 of 1928	1 March 1928
An Ordinance to amend the Industrial Board Ordinance 1922-1926. (Note: Industrial Board Ordinance 1922 (No. 2)) (Repealed by Industrial Board Ordinance 1936 (No. 12))
Defamation Ordinance 1928 (repealed)	No. 7 of 1928	24 April 1928
An Ordinance relating to Defamation. (Repealed by Ordinances Revision Ordinance 1959 (No. 21))
Animals and Birds Protection Ordinance 1928 (repealed)	No. 8 of 1928	27 April 1928
An Ordinance to amend the Animals and Birds Protection Ordinance 1918. (Note: Animals and Birds Protection Ordinance 1918 (No. 1)) (Repealed by Nature Conservation Ordinance 1980 (No. 20))
Cotter River Ordinance 1928 or the Cotter River Act 1928 (repealed)	No. 9 of 1928	27 April 1928
An Ordinance to amend the Cotter River Ordinance 1914-1919. (Note: Cotter River Ordinance 1914 (No. 2)) (Repealed by Cotter River Repeal Act 2000 (No. 7))
Pounds Ordinance 1928 or the Pounds Act 1928 (repealed)	No. 10 of 1928	27 April 1928
An Ordinance relating to the Impounding of Cattle and for Other Purposes. (Repealed by Stock Act 2005 (No. 19))
Housing Ordinance 1928 (repealed)	No. 11 of 1928	10 May 1928
An Ordinance relating to Housing. (Repealed by Housing Assistance Ordinance 1987 (No. 36))
Housing Ordinance (No. 2) 1928 (repealed)	No. 12 of 1928	9 June 1928
An Ordinance to amend the Housing Ordinance 1928. (Note: Housing Ordinance 1928 (No. 11)) (Repealed by Self-Government (Consequential Amendments) Ordinance 1989 (No. 38))
Liquor Poll Ordinance 1928 (repealed)	No. 13 of 1928	30 June 1928
An Ordinance to provide for the taking of a poll in relation to the possession or sale of liquor in the Territory for the Seat of Government. (Repealed by Ordinances Revision Ordinance 1937 (No. 27))
Liquor Poll Ordinance (No. 2) 1928 (repealed)	No. 14 of 1928	7 July 1928
An Ordinance to amend the Liquor Poll Ordinance 1928. (Note: Liquor Poll Ordinance 1928 (No. 13)) (Repealed by Ordinances Revision Ordinance 1937 (No. 27))
Theatres and Public Halls Ordinance 1928 or the Theatres and Public Halls Act 1928 (repealed)	No. 15 of 1928	3 August 1928
An Ordinance to provide for the licensing and regulation of Theatres and Public Halls and places used for Public Entertainments or Public Meetings and the regulation of Public Entertainments and Public Meetings. (Repealed by Statute Law Amendment Act 2001 (No. 11))
Police Superannuation Ordinance 1928 (repealed)	No. 16 of 1928	26 July 1928
An Ordinance relating to Superannuation Allowances and Gratuities to Members of the Commonwealth Police Force. (Repealed by Police Pensions Ordinance 1958 (No. 1))
Building and Services Ordinance 1928 or the Building and Services Act 1928 (repealed)	No. 17 of 1928	31 July 1928
An Ordinance to amend the Building and Services Ordinance 1924-1925. (Note: Building and Services Ordinance 1924 (No. 9)) (Repealed by Statute Law Amendment Act 2000 (No. 80))
National Memorials Ordinance 1928 (Note: This is a reserved law and cannot be amended or repealed by the Legislative Assembly of the Australian Capital Territory.) (repealed)	No. 18 of 1928	31 August 1928
An Ordinance to provide for the Location and Character of National Memorials, and the Nomenclature of Divisions of, and Public Places in, the Canberra City District. (Repealed by Australian Capital Territory National Land (National Memorials, Territory Divisions and Public Places) Ordinance 2022 (No. 3))
Church of England Property Trust Ordinance 1928 or the Church of England Trust Property Ordinance 1928 or the Anglican Church of Australia Trust Property Ordinance 1928 or the Anglican Church of Australia Trust Property Act 1928	No. 19 of 1928	6 September 1928
An Ordinance relating to Church of England Trust Property.
Education Ordinance 1928 (repealed)	No. 20 of 1928	6 September 1928
An Ordinance relating to Education. (Repealed by Education Ordinance 1937 (No. 25))
Public Health Ordinance 1928 or the Public Health Act 1928 (repealed)	No. 21 of 1928	8 November 1928
An Ordinance relating to Public Health. (Repealed by Public Health Act 1997 (No. 69))
Board of Enquiry Ordinance 1928 (repealed)	No. 22 of 1928	29 November 1928
An Ordinance relating to Boards of Enquiry. (Repealed by Seat of Government (Administration) Ordinance 1930 (No. 5))
Public Parks Ordinance 1928 or the Public Parks Act 1928 (repealed)	No. 23 of 1928	13 December 1928
An Ordinance to provide for the Regulation and Protection of Public Parks and Recreation Reserves and for other Purposes. (Repealed by Statute Law Amendment Act 2001 (No. 11))
Liquor Ordinance 1928 (repealed)	No. 24 of 1928	13 December 1928
An Ordinance to make Temporary Provision for the Sale of Liquor and for other Purposes. (Repealed by Liquor Ordinance 1929 (No. 15))

== Sources ==
- "legislation.act.gov.au".
