= List of ordinances of the Australian Capital Territory from 1917 =

This is a list of ordinances enacted by the Governor-General of Australia for the Territory for the Seat of Government (Australian Capital Territory) for the year 1917.

== 1917 ==
Short title, or popular name	Citation	Notified
Long title
Inflammable Liquid Ordinance 1917 (repealed)	No. 1 of 1917	21 November 1917
An Ordinance to provide for the administration of the "Inflammable Liquid Act 1915" (Note: Inflammable Liquid Act 1915 (NSW)) of the State of New South Wales in the Territory for the Seat of Government. (Repealed by Inflammable Liquids Ordinance 1940 (No. 19))
Explosives Ordinance 1917 (repealed)	No. 2 of 1917	27 November 1917
An Ordinance to provide for the Administration of the "Explosives Act 1905" (Note: Explosives Act 1905 (NSW)) of the State of New South Wales in the Territory for the Seat of Government. (Repealed by Ordinances Revision Ordinance 1959 (No. 21))

== Sources ==
- "legislation.act.gov.au".
