= List of ordinances of the Australian Capital Territory from 1925 =

This is a list of ordinances enacted by the Governor-General of Australia for the Territory for the Seat of Government (Australian Capital Territory) for the year 1925.

== 1925 ==
Short title, or popular name	Citation	Notified
Long title
Real Property Ordinance 1925 or the Real Property Act 1925 or the Land Titles Act 1925	No. 1 of 1925	21 May 1925
An Ordinance relating to the Declaration of Titles to Land and the Facilitation of its Transfer.
Industrial Board Ordinance 1925 (repealed)	No. 2 of 1925	11 June 1925
An Ordinance to amend the Industrial Board Ordinances 1922. (Note: Industrial Board Ordinance 1922 (No. 2)) (Repealed by Industrial Board Ordinance 1936 (No. 12))
Queanbeyan Water Supply Ordinance 1925 (repealed)	No. 3 of 1925	20 August 1925
An Ordinance to approve the Agreement made between the Commonwealth of Australia, the State of New South Wales, and the Council of the Municipality of Queanbeyan respecting the establishment of a Water Supply for the Town of Queanbeyan, and for other purposes. (Repealed by Self-Government (Consequential Amendments) Ordinance 1989 (No. 38))
Leases Ordinance 1925 or the Leases Act 1925 (repealed)	No. 4 of 1925	1 October 1925
An Ordinance to amend the Leases Ordinance 1918-1919 (Note: Leases Ordinance 1918 (No. 2)) and for other purposes. (Repealed by Land (Planning and Environment) (Consequential Provisions) Act 1991 (No. 118))
Fish Protection Ordinance 1925 (repealed)	No. 5 of 1925	1 October 1925
An Ordinance to amend the Fish Protection Ordinance 1919. (Note: Fish Protection Ordinance 1919 (No. 3)) (Repealed by Fish Protection Ordinance 1929 (No. 2))
Interpretation Ordinance 1925 (repealed)	No. 6 of 1925	5 November 1925
An Ordinance to amend the Interpretation Ordinance 1914-1922. (Note: Interpretation Ordinance 1914 (No. 1)) (Repealed by Interpretation Ordinance 1937 (No. 29))
Trespass on Commonwealth Lands Ordinance 1925 (repealed)	No. 7 of 1925	5 November 1925
An Ordinance to amend the Trespass on Commonwealth Lands Ordinance 1922-1924. (Note: Trespass on Commonwealth Lands Ordinance 1922 (No. 1)) (Repealed by Trespass on Commonwealth Lands Ordinance 1932 (No. 20))
Federal Capital Commission's Powers Ordinance 1925 (repealed)	No. 8 of 1925	5 November 1925
An Ordinance to amend the Federal Capital Commission's Powers Ordinance 1924. (Note: Federal Capital Commission's Powers Ordinance 1924 (No. 12)) (Repealed by Ordinances Revision Ordinance 1937 (No. 27))
Building and Services Ordinance 1925 or the Building and Services Act 1925 (repealed)	No. 9 of 1925	5 November 1925
An Ordinance to amend the Building and Services Ordinance 1924. (Note: Building and Services Ordinance 1924 (No. 9)) (Repealed by Statute Law Amendment Act 2000 (No. 80))
City Area Leases Ordinance 1925 (repealed)	No. 10 of 1925	5 November 1925
An Ordinance to amend the City Area Leases Ordinances 1924. (Note: City Area Leases Ordinances 1924 (No. 8)) (Repealed by City Area Leases Ordinance 1936 (No. 31))
Leases (Special Purposes) Ordinance 1925 or the Leases (Special Purposes) Act 1925 (repealed)	No. 11 of 1925	5 November 1925
An Ordinance relating to the Leasing of Commonwealth Land for purposes other than Business or Residential Purposes. (Repealed by Land (Planning and Environment) (Consequential Provisions) Act 1991 (No. 118))
Real Property Ordinance (No. 2) 1925 or the Real Property Act (No. 2) 1925 (repealed)	No. 12 of 1925	26 November 1925
An Ordinance to amend the Real Property Ordinance 1925. (Note: Real Property Ordinance 1925 (No. 1)) (Repealed by Statute Law Amendment Act 2000 (No. 80))
Dairies Supervision Ordinance 1925 (repealed)	No. 13 of 1925	26 November 1925
An Ordinance to provide for the Supervision of Dairies. (Repealed by Public Health Ordinance 1930 (No. 18))
Gun Licence Ordinance 1925 (repealed)	No. 14 of 1925	26 November 1925
An Ordinance relating to the Licensing of Guns and Firearms. (Repealed by Gun Licence Ordinance 1937 (No. 6))

== Sources ==
- "legislation.act.gov.au".
