= List of ordinances of the Australian Capital Territory from 1935 =

This is a list of ordinances enacted by the Governor-General of Australia for the Territory for the Seat of Government (Australian Capital Territory) for the year 1935.

== 1935 ==
Short title, or popular name	Citation	Notified
Long title
City Area Leases Ordinance 1935 (repealed)	No. 1 of 1935	4 January 1935
An Ordinance to amend the City Area Leases Ordinance 1924-1929 (Note: City Area Leases Ordinance 1924 (No. 8)) as amended by the Seat of Government (Administration) Ordinance 1930, (Note: Seat of Government (Administration) Ordinance 1930 (No. 5)) by the Seat of Government (Administration) Ordinance 1933, (Note: Seat of Government (Administration) Ordinance 1933 (No. 4)) and by the City Area Leases Ordinance 1934, (Note: City Area Leases Ordinance 1934 (No. 20)) and for other purposes. (Repealed by City Area Leases Act 1936 (No. 31))
Advisory Council Ordinance 1935 (repealed)	No. 2 of 1935	31 January 1935
An Ordinance relating to the Term of Office of elected members of the Advisory Council. (Repealed by Advisory Council Ordinance (No. 2) 1985 (No. 21))
Traffic Ordinance 1935 (repealed)	No. 3 of 1935	14 February 1935
An Ordinance to amend the Traffic Ordinance 1912-1923, (Note: Traffic Ordinance 1912 (No. 1)) as amended by the Federal Capital Commission's Powers Ordinance 1924-1925. (Note: Federal Capital Commission's Powers Ordinance 1924 (No. 12)) (Repealed by Traffic Ordinance 1937 (No. 32))
Juvenile Offenders (Detention) Ordinance 1935 (repealed)	No. 4 of 1935	28 February 1935
An Ordinance to provide for the Detention in State Institutions of Uncontrollable Children and Juvenile Offenders, and for other purposes. (Repealed by Juvenile Offenders Ordinance 1941 (No. 11))
Electrical Interference Ordinance 1935 (repealed)	No. 5 of 1935	13 June 1935
An Ordinance relating to Electrical Interference. (Repealed by Ordinances Revision Ordinance 1978 (No. 46))
Lotteries and Art Unions Ordinance 1935 (repealed)	No. 6 of 1935	11 April 1935
An Ordinance to amend the Lotteries and Art Unions Ordinance 1926-1933. (Note: Lotteries and Art Unions Ordinance 1926 (No. 14)) (Repealed by Lotteries Ordinance 1964 (No. 13))
Fish Protection Ordinance 1935 (repealed)	No. 7 of 1935	20 June 1935
An Ordinance to amend the Fish Protection Ordinance 1929-1931. (Note: Fish Protection Ordinance 1929 (No. 2)) (Repealed by Fishing Ordinance 1967 (No. 7))
Hawkers Ordinance 1935 (repealed)	No. 8 of 1935	27 June 1935
An Ordinance to amend the Hawkers Ordinance 1926-1934. (Note: Hawkers Ordinance 1926 (No. 13)) (Repealed by Hawkers Ordinance 1936 (No. 43))
Business Names Ordinance 1935 (repealed)	No. 9 of 1935	1 August 1935
An Ordinance to amend the Business Names Ordinance 1933. (Note: Business Names Ordinance 1933 (No. 31)) (Repealed by Business Names Ordinance 1956 (No. 18))
Liquor Ordinance 1935 (repealed)	No. 10 of 1935	1 August 1935
An Ordinance to amend the Liquor Ordinance 1929-1932. (Note: Liquor Ordinance 1929 (No. 15)) (Repealed by Liquor Ordinance 1975 (No. 19))
Liquor Ordinance (No. 2) 1935 (repealed)	No. 11 of 1935	26 August 1935
An Ordinance to amend the Liquor Ordinance 1929-1932, as amended by the Liquor Ordinance 1935. (Note: Liquor Ordinance 1935 (No. 10)) (Repealed by Liquor Ordinance 1975 (No. 19))
Canberra Community Hospital Board Ordinance 1935 (repealed)	No. 12 of 1935	29 August 1935
An Ordinance to make Provision for the Control and Management of the Canberra Community Hospital, and for other purposes. (Repealed by Canberra Community Hospital Ordinance 1938 (No. 20))
Hospital Tax Ordinance 1935 (repealed)	No. 13 of 1935	29 August 1935
An Ordinance relating to the Imposition, Assessment, and Collection of Hospital Tax. (Repealed by Hospital Tax Ordinance Repeal Ordinance 1946 (No. 10))
Companies Ordinance 1935 (repealed)	No. 14 of 1935	19 September 1935
An Ordinance to amend the Companies Ordinance 1931-1932. (Note: Companies Ordinance 1931 (No. 25)) (Repealed by Companies Ordinance 1954 (No. 14))
Companies (Liquidation) Ordinance 1935 (repealed)	No. 15 of 1935	26 September 1935
An Ordinance to provide for the Winding-up of certain Companies, and for other purposes. (Repealed by Companies Ordinance 1954 (No. 14))
Canberra Community Hospital Board Ordinance (No. 2) 1935 (repealed)	No. 16 of 1935	31 October 1935
An Ordinance to amend the Canberra Community Hospital Board Ordinance 1935. (Note: Canberra Community Hospital Board Ordinance 1935 (No. 12)) (Repealed by Canberra Community Hospital Ordinance 1938 (No. 20))
City Area Leases Ordinance (No. 2) 1935 (repealed)	No. 17 of 1935	31 October 1935
An Ordinance to amend the City Area Leases Ordinance 1924-1929, as amended by the Seat of Government (Administration) Ordinance 1930, by the Seat of Government (Administration) Ordinance 1933, by the City Area Leases Ordinance 1934, and by the City Area Leases Ordinance 1935. (Note: City Area Leases Ordinance 1935 (No. 1)) (Repealed by City Area Leases Ordinance 1936 (No. 31))
Mortgagors' Interest Reduction Ordinance 1935 (repealed)	No. 18 of 1935	21 November 1935
An Ordinance to amend the Mortgagors' Interest Reduction Ordinance 1931. (Note: Mortgagors' Interest Reduction Ordinance 1931 (No. 14)) (Repealed by Ordinances Revision Ordinance 1938 (No. 35))
Racecourses Ordinance 1935 or the Racecourses Act 1935 (repealed)	No. 19 of 1935	5 December 1935
An Ordinance relating to Racecourses and for other purposes. (Repealed by Racing Act 1999 (No. 1))
Dentists Registration Ordinance 1935 or the Dentists Registration Act 1935 (repealed)	No. 20 of 1935	12 December 1935
An Ordinance to amend the Dentists Registration Ordinance 1931-1933. (Note: Dentists Registration Ordinance 1931 (No. 8)) (Repealed by Statute Law Amendment Act 2000 (No. 80))
Advisory Council Ordinance (No. 2) 1935 (repealed)	No. 21 of 1935	19 December 1935
An Ordinance to amend the Advisory Council Ordinance 1930-1932. (Note: Advisory Council Ordinance 1930 (No. 4)) (Repealed by Advisory Council Ordinance 1936 (No. 49))
Motor Traffic Ordinance 1935 (repealed)	No. 22 of 1935	19 December 1935
An Ordinance to amend the Motor Traffic Ordinance 1932-1933. (Note: Motor Traffic Ordinance 1932 (No. 1)) (Repealed by Motor Traffic Ordinance 1936 (No. 45))

== Sources ==
- "legislation.act.gov.au".
