= List of ordinances of the Australian Capital Territory from 1913 =

This is a list of ordinances enacted by the Governor-General of Australia for the Territory for the Seat of Government (Australian Capital Territory) for the year 1913.

== 1913 ==
Short title, or popular name	Citation	Notified
Long title
Animals and Birds Protection Ordinance 1913 (repealed)	No. 1 of 1913	10 February 1913
An Ordinance for the Protection of Animals and Birds. (Repealed by Animals and Birds Protection Ordinance 1918 (No. 1))

== Sources ==
- "legislation.act.gov.au".
