= List of ordinances of the Australian Capital Territory from 2014 =

This is a list of ordinances enacted by the Governor-General of Australia for the Australian Capital Territory for the year 2014.

== 2014 ==
Short title, or popular name	Citation	Notified
Long title
National Land (Parking) Repeal Ordinance 2014 (Note: This is a reserved law and cannot be amended or repealed by the Legislative Assembly of the Australian Capital Territory.) (repealed)	No. 1 of 2014	20 February 2014
(Repealed by Legislative Instruments Act 2003 (No. 139 (Cth)))
Australian Capital Territory National Land (Road Transport) Ordinance 2014 (repealed)	No. 2 of 2014	20 February 2014
(Repealed)
National Land Amendment (Water Management) Ordinance 2014 (repealed)	No. 3 of 2014	2 December 2014
(Repealed by Legislative Instruments Act 2003 (No. 139 (Cth)))

== Sources ==
- "legislation.act.gov.au".
