= List of ordinances of the Australian Capital Territory from 1912 =

This is a list of ordinances enacted by the Governor-General of Australia for the Territory for the Seat of Government (Australian Capital Territory) for the year 1912.

== 1912 ==
Short title, or popular name	Citation	Notified
Long title
Traffic Ordinance 1912 (repealed)	No. 1 of 1912	6 February 1912
An Ordinance for the care, control, maintenance, and management of Public Places, and for the regulation of Traffic within the Territory for the Seat of Government. (Repealed by Traffic Ordinance 1937 (No. 32))
Rates Ordinance 1912 (repealed)	No. 2 of 1912	28 March 1912
An Ordinance to amend the Rates Ordinance 1911. (Note: Rates Ordinance 1911 (No. 2)) (Repealed by Rates Ordinance 1926 (No. 6))
Traffic Ordinance 1912 (No. 2) (repealed)	No. 3 of 1912	25 July 1912
An Ordinance to amend the Traffic Ordinance 1912. (Note: Traffic Ordinance 1912 (No. 1)) (Repealed by Traffic Ordinance 1937 (No. 32))
Public Health Ordinance 1912 (repealed)	No. 4 of 1912	2 August 1912
An Ordinance relating to Public Health. (Repealed by Public Health Ordinance 1928 (No. 21))

== Sources ==
- "legislation.act.gov.au".
