= List of ordinances of the Australian Capital Territory from 1916 =

This is a list of ordinances enacted by the Governor-General of Australia for the Territory for the Seat of Government (Australian Capital Territory) for the year 1916.

== 1916 ==
Short title, or popular name	Citation	Notified
Long title
Careless Use of Fire Ordinance 1916 (repealed)	No. 1 of 1916	29 June 1916
An Ordinance relating to the Prevention of the Careless Use of Fire. (Repealed by Careless Use of Fire Ordinance 1936 (No. 20))

== Sources ==
- "legislation.act.gov.au".
