= List of ordinances of the Australian Capital Territory from 2022 =

This is a list of ordinances enacted by the Governor-General of Australia for the Australian Capital Territory for the year 2022.

== 2022 ==
Short title, or popular name	Citation	Notified
Long title
Australian Capital Territory National Land (Lakes) Ordinance 2022 (Note: This is a reserved law and cannot be amended or repealed by the Legislative Assembly of the Australian Capital Territory.)	No. 1 of 2022	1 April 2022
Australian Capital Territory National Land (Leased) Ordinance 2022	No. 2 of 2022	1 April 2022
Australian Capital Territory National Land (National Memorials, Territory Divisions and Public Places) Ordinance 2022	No. 3 of 2022	1 April 2022
Australian Capital Territory National Land (Unleased) Ordinance 2022	No. 4 of 2022	1 April 2022

== Sources ==
- "legislation.act.gov.au".
