= List of ordinances of the Australian Capital Territory from 1927 =

This is a list of ordinances enacted by the Governor-General of Australia for the Territory for the Seat of Government (Australian Capital Territory) for the year 1927.

== 1927 ==
Short title, or popular name	Citation	Notified
Long title
Provisional Government Ordinance 1927 (repealed)	No. 1 of 1927	27 January 1927
An Ordinance to amend the Provisional Government Ordinance 1911-1926. (Note: Provisional Government Ordinance 1911 (No. 1)) (Repealed by Seat of Government (Administration) Ordinance 1937 (No. 4))
Auctioneers Ordinance 1927 (repealed)	No. 2 of 1927	27 January 1927
An Ordinance relating to Auctioneers. (Repealed by Auctioneers Ordinance 1959 (No. 2))
Provisional Government Ordinance (No. 2) 1927 (repealed)	No. 3 of 1927	27 January 1927
An Ordinance to amend the Provisional Government Ordinance 1911-1926. (Repealed by Seat of Government (Administration) Ordinance 1937 (No. 4))
Interpretation Ordinance 1927 (repealed)	No. 4 of 1927	27 January 1927
An Ordinance to amend the Interpretation Ordinance 1914-1925. (Note: Interpretation Ordinance 1914 (No. 1)) (Repealed by Interpretation Ordinance 1937 (No. 29))
Leases (Special Purposes) Ordinance 1927 or the Leases (Special Purposes) Act 1927 (repealed)	No. 5 of 1927	27 January 1927
An Ordinance to amend the Leases (Special Purposes) Ordinance 1925. (Note: Leases (Special Purposes) Ordinance 1925 (No. 11)) (Repealed by Land (Planning and Environment) (Consequential Provisions) Act 1991 (No. 118))
Provisional Government Ordinance (No. 3) 1927 (repealed)	No. 6 of 1927	27 January 1927
An Ordinance to amend the Provisional Government Ordinance 1911-1927. (Repealed by Ordinances Revision Ordinance 1937 (No. 27))
Meat Ordinance 1927 (repealed)	No. 7 of 1927	27 January 1927
An Ordinance to amend the Meat Ordinance 1920-1926. (Note: Meat Ordinance 1920 (No. 1)) (Repealed by Meat Ordinance 1931 (No. 13))
Bank Holidays Ordinance 1927 (repealed)	No. 8 of 1927	27 January 1927
An Ordinance relating to Bank Holidays. (Repealed by Bank Holidays Ordinance 1952 (No. 3))
Maintenance Orders (Facilities for Enforcement) Ordinance 1927 (repealed)	No. 9 of 1927	27 January 1927
An Ordinance to facilitate the enforcement in the Territory for the Seat of Government of Maintenance Orders made in England and Ireland and other parts of His Majesty's Dominions and Protectorates and vice versa. (Repealed by Maintenance Ordinance 1968 (No. 20))
Leases Ordinance 1927 or the Leases Act 1927 (repealed)	No. 10 of 1927	27 January 1927
An Ordinance to amend the Leases Ordinance 1918-1926. (Note: Leases Ordinance 1918 (No. 2)) (Repealed by Land (Planning and Environment) (Consequential Provisions) Act 1991 (No. 118))
Districts Ordinance 1927 (repealed)	No. 11 of 1927	27 January 1927
An Ordinance to provide for the Division of the Territory into Districts, Divisions and Portions, and to simplify the Description of Land. (Repealed by Districts Ordinance 1966 (No. 5))
Bank Holidays Ordinance (No. 2) 1927 (repealed)	No. 12 of 1927	27 January 1927
An Ordinance to amend the Bank Holidays Ordinance 1927. (Note: Bank Holidays Ordinance 1927 (No. 8)) (Repealed by Bank Holidays Ordinance 1952 (No. 3))
Church Lands Leases Ordinance 1927 or the Church Lands Leases Act 1927 (repealed)	No. 13 of 1927	27 January 1927
An Ordinance to amend the Church Lands Leases Ordinance 1924. (Note: Church Lands Leases Ordinance 1924 (No. 10)) (Repealed by Land (Planning and Environment) (Consequential Provisions) Act 1991 (No. 118))
Tobacco Ordinance 1927 or the Tobacco Act 1927 or the Tobacco and Other Smoking Products Act 1927	No. 14 of 1927	27 January 1927
An Ordinance relating to the sale of Tobacco Cigars and Cigarettes.
Real Property Ordinance 1927 or the Real Property Act 1927 (repealed)	No. 15 of 1927	27 January 1927
An Ordinance to amend the Real Property Ordinance 1925-1926. (Note: Real Property Ordinance 1925 (No. 1)) (Repealed by Statute Law Amendment Act 2000 (No. 80))
Motor Traffic Ordinance 1927 (repealed)	No. 16 of 1927	27 January 1927
An Ordinance to amend the Motor Traffic Ordinance 1926. (Note: Motor Traffic Ordinance 1926 (No. 15)) (Repealed by Motor Traffic Ordinance 1932 (No. 1))
Timber Protection Ordinance 1927 (repealed)	No. 17 of 1927	27 January 1927
An Ordinance to amend the Timber Protection Ordinance 1919-1923. (Note: Timber Protection Ordinance 1919 (No. )) (Repealed by Nature Conservation Ordinance 1980 (No. 20))
Trespass on Commonwealth Lands Ordinance 1927 (repealed)	No. 18 of 1927	27 January 1927
An Ordinance to amend the Trespass on Commonwealth Lands Ordinance 1922-1926. (Note: Trespass on Commonwealth Lands Ordinance 1922 (No. 1)) (Repealed by Trespass on Commonwealth Lands Ordinance 1932 (No. 20))
Police Ordinance 1927 or the Police Act 1927 (repealed)	No. 19 of 1927	27 January 1927
An Ordinance to provide for the Establishment of a Police Force in the Territory for the Seat of Government. (Repealed by Crimes (Amendment) Act (No. 2) 1994 (No. 75))
Careless Use of Fire Ordinance 1927 (repealed)	No. 20 of 1927	27 January 1927
An Ordinance to amend the Careless Use of Fire Ordinance 1916-1926. (Note: Careless Use of Fire Ordinance 1916 (No. 1)) (Repealed by Careless Use of Fire Ordinance 1936 (No. 20))
Real Property Ordinance (No. 2) 1927 or the Real Property Act (No. 2) 1927 (repealed)	No. 21 of 1927	27 January 1927
An Ordinance to the Real Property Ordinance 1925-1927. (Repealed by Statute Law Amendment Act 2000 (No. 80))

== Sources ==
- "legislation.act.gov.au".
