= List of ordinances of the Australian Capital Territory from 2025 =

This is a list of ordinances enacted by the Governor-General of Australia for the Australian Capital Territory for the year 2025.

== 2025 ==
Short title, or popular name	Citation	Notified
Long title
Australian Capital Territory National Land (Road Transport) Ordinance 2025 (Note: This is a reserved law and cannot be amended or repealed by the Legislative Assembly of the Australian Capital Territory.)	No. 1 of 2025	27 February 2025
Australian Capital Territory National Land (Road Transport) (Repeal and Consequential Amendments) Ordinance 2025	No. 2 of 2025	27 February 2025

== Sources ==
- "legislation.act.gov.au".
