= List of ordinances of the Australian Capital Territory from 1931 =

This is a list of ordinances enacted by the Governor-General of Australia for the Territory for the Seat of Government (Australian Capital Territory) for the year 1931.

== 1931 ==
Short title, or popular name	Citation	Notified
Long title
Fish Protection Ordinance 1931 (repealed)	No. 1 of 1931	26 February 1931
An Ordinance to amend the Fish Protection Ordinance 1929. (Note: Fish Protection Ordinance 1929 (No. 2)) (Repealed by Fishing Ordinance 1967 (No. 7))
Public Baths Ordinance 1931 (repealed)	No. 2 of 1931	26 February 1931
An Ordinance relating to Public Baths. (Repealed by Public Baths and Public Bathing Act 1956 (No. 12))
Careless Use of Fire Ordinance 1931 (repealed)	No. 3 of 1931	26 February 1931
An Ordinance to amend the Careless Use of Fire Ordinance 1916-1927. (Note: Careless Use of Fire Ordinance 1916 (No. 1)) (Repealed by Careless Use of Fire Ordinance 1936 (No. 20))
Liquor Ordinance 1931 (repealed)	No. 4 of 1931	19 March 1931
An Ordinance to amend the Liquor Ordinance 1929-1930. (Note: Liquor Ordinance 1929 (No. 15)) (Repealed by Liquor Ordinance 1975 (No. 19))
Rates Ordinance 1931 or the Rates Act 1931 (repealed)	No. 5 of 1931	16 April 1931
An Ordinance to amend the Rates Ordinance 1926-1929. (Note: Rates Ordinance 1926 (No. 6)) (Repealed by Statute Law Amendment Act 2000 (No. 80))
Advisory Council Ordinance 1931 (repealed)	No. 6 of 1931	23 April 1931
An Ordinance to amend the Advisory Council Ordinance 1930. (Note: Advisory Council Ordinance 1930 (No. 4)) (Repealed by Advisory Council Ordinance 1936 (No. 49))
Medical Practitioners Registration Ordinance 1931 or the Medical Practitioners Registration Act 1931 (repealed)	No. 7 of 1931	30 April 1931
An Ordinance to amend the Medical Practitioners Registration Ordinance 1930. (Note: Medical Practitioners Registration Ordinance 1930 (No. 13)) (Repealed by Statute Law Amendment Act 2000 (No. 80))
Dentists Registration Ordinance 1931 or the Dentists Registration Act 1931 or the Dentists Act 1931 (repealed)	No. 8 of 1931	30 April 1931
An Ordinance to provide for the Registration of Persons engaged in Dental Practice. (Repealed by Health Professionals Act 2004 (No. 38))
Canberra Social Service Association (Winding-up) Ordinance 1931 (repealed)	No. 9 of 1931	21 May 1931
An Ordinance relating to the Winding-up of the Canberra Social Service Association. (Repealed by Ordinances Revision Ordinance 1937 (No. 27))
Pharmacy Ordinance 1931 or the Pharmacy Act 1931 (repealed)	No. 10 of 1931	4 June 1931
An Ordinance to provide for the Registration of Pharmacists and to Control the Practice of Pharmacy. (Repealed by Health Professionals Act 2004 (No. 38))
Liquor Ordinance (No. 2) 1931 (repealed)	No. 11 of 1931	15 June 1931
An Ordinance to amend the Liquor Ordinance 1929-30, as amended by the Liquor Ordinance 1931. (Note: Liquor Ordinance 1931 (No. 4)) (Repealed by Liquor Ordinance 1975 (No. 19))
Cotter River Ordinance 1931 or the Cotter River Act 1931 (repealed)	No. 12 of 1931	2 July 1931
An Ordinance to amend the Cotter River Ordinance 1914-1928. (Note: Cotter River Ordinance 1914 (No. 2)) (Repealed by Cotter River Repeal Act 2000 (No. 7))
Meat Ordinance 1931 or the Meat Act 1931 (repealed)	No. 13 of 1931	23 July 1931
An Ordinance to Control Slaughtering and the Sale of Meat. (Repealed by Food Act 2001 (No. 66))
Mortgagors' Interest Reduction Ordinance 1931 (repealed)	No. 14 of 1931	6 August 1931
An Ordinance to provide for the Reduction of the Rates of Interest payable in respect of certain fixed Liabilities and to enable Tribunals to give effect to such Reduction. (Repealed by Ordinances Revision Ordinance 1938 (No. 35))
Liquor Ordinance (No. 3) 1931 (repealed)	No. 15 of 1931	20 August 1931
An Ordinance to amend the Liquor Ordinance 1929-30, as amended by the Liquor Ordinance 1931 and the Liquor Ordinance (No. 2) 1931. (Note: Liquor Ordinance (No. 2) 1931 (No. 11)) (Repealed by Liquor Ordinance 1975 (No. 19))
Trading Hours Ordinance 1931 (repealed)	No. 16 of 1931	10 September 1931
An Ordinance to amend the Trading Hours Ordinance 1926. (Note: Trading Hours Ordinance 1926 (No. 22)) (Repealed by Trading Hours Ordinance 1962 (No. 19))
Fish Protection Ordinance (No. 2) 1931 (repealed)	No. 17 of 1931	10 September 1931
An Ordinance to amend the Fish Protection Ordinance 1929-1931. (Note: Fish Protection Ordinance 1929 (No. 2)) (Repealed by Fishing Ordinance 1967 (No. 7))
Public Baths Ordinance (No. 2) 1931 (repealed)	No. 18 of 1931	10 September 1931
An Ordinance to amend the Public Baths Ordinance 1931. (Note: Public Baths Ordinance 1931 (No. 2)) (Repealed by Public Baths and Public Bathing Ordinance 1956 (No. 12))
Bills of Sale Ordinance 1931 (repealed)	No. 19 of 1931	22 October 1931
An Ordinance to amend the Bills of Sale Ordinance 1930. (Note: Bills of Sale Ordinance 1930 (No. 7)) (Repealed by Instruments Ordinance 1933 (No. 25))
Mining Ordinance 1931 or the Mining Act 1931 (repealed)	No. 20 of 1931	22 October 1931
An Ordinance to amend the Mining Ordinance 1930. (Note: Mining Ordinance 1930 (No. 1)) (Repealed by Land (Planning and Environment) (Amendment) Act (No. 2) 1995 (No. 21))
Seat of Government (Administration) Ordinance 1931 (repealed)	No. 21 of 1931	12 November 1931
An Ordinance to amend the Seat of Government (Administration) Ordinance 1930. (Note: Seat of Government (Administration) Ordinance 1930 (No. 5)) (Repealed by Seat of Government (Administration) (Repeal) Ordinance 1989 (No. 43))
Workmen's Compensation Ordinance 1931 (repealed)	No. 22 of 1931	12 November 1931
An Ordinance relating to Compensation to Workmen for Injuries suffered in the course of their Employment and for other purposes. (Repealed by Workmen's Compensation Ordinance 1946 (No. 2))
National Memorials Ordinance 1931 (Note: This is a reserved law and cannot be amended or repealed by the Legislative Assembly of the Australian Capital Territory.) (repealed)	No. 23 of 1931	3 December 1931
An Ordinance to amend the National Memorials Ordinance 1928. (Note: National Memorials Ordinance 1928 (No. 18)) (Repealed by Infrastructure and Regional Development (Spent and Redundant Instruments) Repeal Regulation 2014 (Cth))
Crimes Ordinance 1931 (repealed)	No. 24 of 1931	3 December 1931
An Ordinance to repeal the Crimes (Amendment) Act 1905 (Note: Crimes (Amendment) Act 1905 (No. 12 (NSW))) of the State of New South Wales in its application to the Territory, and for other purposes. (Repealed by Crimes Ordinance 1963 (No. 11))
Companies Ordinance 1931 (repealed)	No. 25 of 1931	3 December 1931
An Ordinance relating to Companies. (Repealed by Companies Ordinance 1954 (No. 14))

== Sources ==
- "legislation.act.gov.au".
