= List of ordinances of the Australian Capital Territory from 1922 =

This is a list of ordinances enacted by the Governor-General of Australia for the Territory for the Seat of Government (Australian Capital Territory) for the year 1922.

== 1922 ==
| Short title, or popular name | Citation | Notified |
Long title
| Trespass on Commonwealth Lands Ordinance 1922 (repealed) | No. 1 of 1922 | 13 April 1922 |
An Ordinance relating to Trespass on Commonwealth Lands. (Repealed by Trespass on Commonwealth Lands Ordinance 1932 (No. 20))
| Industrial Board Ordinance 1922 (repealed) | No. 2 of 1922 | 20 April 1922 |
An Ordinance to provide for an Industrial Board in the Territory for the Seat of Government. (Repealed by Industrial Board Ordinance 1936 (No. 12))
| Industrial Board Ordinance 1922 (No. 2) (repealed) | No. 3 of 1922 | 9 May 1922 |
An Ordinance to amend the Industrial Board Ordinance 1922. (Note: Industrial Board Ordinance 1922 (No. 2)) (Repealed by Industrial Board Ordinance 1936 (No. 12))
| Vine and Vegetation Diseases and Fruit Pests Ordinance 1922 (repealed) | No. 4 of 1922 | 20 July 1922 |
An Ordinance relating to Vine and Vegetation Diseases and Fruit Pests.
| Interpretation Ordinance 1922 (repealed) | No. 5 of 1922 | 20 July 1922 |
An Ordinance to amend the Interpretation Ordinance 1914. (Note: Interpretation Ordinance 1914 (No. 1)) (Repealed by Interpretation Ordinance 1937 (No. 29))
| Noxious Weeds Ordinance 1922 or the Noxious Weeds Act 1922 (repealed) | No. 6 of 1922 | 26 October 1922 |
An Ordinance to amend the Noxious Weeds Ordinance 1921. (Note: Noxious Weeds Ordinance 1921 (No. 2)) (Repealed by Land (Planning and Environment) (Amendment) Act 1997 (No. 7))

== Sources ==
- "legislation.act.gov.au".
