= List of ordinances of the Australian Capital Territory from 2015 =

This is a list of ordinances enacted by the Governor-General of Australia for the Australian Capital Territory for the year 2015.

== 2015 ==
Short title, or popular name	Citation	Notified
Long title
Australian Capital Territory National Land Amendment (Diplomatic Leases) Ordinance 2015 (Note: This is a reserved law and cannot be amended or repealed by the Legislative Assembly of the Australian Capital Territory.) (repealed)	No. 8 of 2015	30 October 2015
(Repealed by Legislative Instruments Act 2003 (No. 139 (Cth)))

== Sources ==
- "legislation.act.gov.au".
