= List of ordinances of the Australian Capital Territory from 1923 =

This is a list of ordinances enacted by the Governor-General of Australia for the Territory for the Seat of Government (Australian Capital Territory) for the year 1923.

== 1923 ==
Short title, or popular name	Citation	Notified
Long title
Rates Ordinance 1923 (repealed)	No. 1 of 1923	1 March 1923
An Ordinance to amend the Rates Ordinance 1911—1920. (Note: Rates Ordinance 1911 (No. 2)) (Repealed by Rates Ordinance 1926 (No. 6))
Trespass on Commonwealth Lands Ordinance 1923 (repealed)	No. 2 of 1923	1 March 1923
An Ordinance to amend the Trespass on Commonwealth Lands Ordinance 1922. (Note: Trespass on Commonwealth Lands Ordinance 1922 (No. 1)) (Repealed by Trespass on Commonwealth Lands Ordinance 1932 (No. 20))
Traffic Ordinance 1923 (repealed)	No. 3 of 1923	24 May 1923
An Ordinance to amend the Traffic Ordinance 1912. (Note: Traffic Ordinance 1912 (No. 1)) (Repealed by Traffic Ordinance 1937 (No. 32))
Timber Protection Ordinance 1923 (repealed)	No. 4 of 1923	7 June 1923
An Ordinance to amend the Timber Protection Ordinance 1919. (Note: Timber Protection Ordinance 1919 (No. 2)) (Repealed by Nature Conservation Ordinance 1980 (No. 20))
Recreation Land Leases Ordinance 1923 (repealed)	No. 5 of 1923	30 June 1923
An Ordinance relating to the Leasing of Commonwealth Lands in the Territory to Trustees for Recreation Purposes. (Repealed by Public Parks Ordinance 1928 (No. 23))
Delegation of Authority Ordinance 1923 (repealed)	No. 6 of 1923	30 June 1923
An Ordinance to provide for the delegation of the powers and functions of the Minister to the Commonwealth Surveyor-General and Director of Lands. (Repealed by Seat of Government (Administration) Ordinance 1930 (No. 5))
Leases Ordinance 1923 (repealed)	No. 7 of 1923	16 August 1923
An Ordinance to amend the Leases Ordinance 1918-1919. (Note: Leases Ordinance 1918 (No. 2)) (Repealed by Leases Ordinance 1925 (No. 4))
Seat of Government Railway Ordinance 1923 (repealed)	No. 8 of 1923	13 September 1923
An Ordinance relating to the Management of the Seat of Government Railway. (Repealed by Self-Government (Consequential Amendments) Ordinance 1989 (No. 38))
Trespass on Commonwealth Lands Ordinance 1923 (No. 2) (Note: Both ordinances No. 9 and No. 10 were given the short title Trespass on Commonwealth Lands Ordinance 1923 (No. 2).) (repealed)	No. 9 of 1923	20 September 1923
An Ordinance to amend the Trespass on Commonwealth Lands Ordinance 1922-1923. (Repealed by Trespass on Commonwealth Lands Ordinance 1932 (No. 20))
Trespass on Commonwealth Lands Ordinance 1923 (No. 2) or the Trespass on Commonwealth Lands Ordinance 1923 (No. 3) (repealed)	No. 10 of 1923	15 November 1923
An Ordinance to amend the Trespass on Commonwealth Lands Ordinance 1922-1923. (Repealed by Trespass on Commonwealth Lands Ordinance 1924 (No. 2))

== Sources ==
- "legislation.act.gov.au".
