= List of ordinances of the Australian Capital Territory from 1926 =

This is a list of ordinances enacted by the Governor-General of Australia for the Territory for the Seat of Government (Australian Capital Territory) for the year 1926.

== 1926 ==
Short title, or popular name	Citation	Notified
Long title
Dogs Registration Ordinance 1926 (repealed)	No. 1 of 1926	21 January 1926
An Ordinance relating to Registration of Dogs. (Repealed by Dog Control Ordinance 1975 (No. 18))
Fire Precautions Ordinance 1926 (repealed)	No. 2 of 1926	18 March 1926
An Ordinance to provide for Precautions against Fire. (Repealed by Fire Brigade Ordinance 1957 (No. 20))
Careless Use of Fire Ordinance 1926 (repealed)	No. 3 of 1926	8 April 1926
An Ordinance to amend the Careless Use of Fire Ordinance 1916. (Note: Careless Use of Fire Ordinance 1916 (No. 1)) (Repealed by Careless Use of Fire Ordinance 1936 (No. 20))
Industrial Board Ordinance 1926 (repealed)	No. 4 of 1926	18 May 1926
An Ordinance to amend the Industrial Board Ordinance 1922-1925. (Note: Industrial Board Ordinance 1922 (No. 2)) (Repealed by Industrial Board Ordinance 1936 (No. 12))
City Area Leases Ordinance 1926 (repealed)	No. 5 of 1926	18 May 1926
An Ordinance to amend the City Area Leases Ordinance 1924-1925. (Note: City Area Leases Ordinance 1924 (No. 8)) (Repealed by City Area Leases Ordinance 1936 (No. 31))
Rates Ordinance 1926 or the Rates and Land Tax Ordinance 1926 or the Rates and Land Tax Act 1926 (repealed)	No. 6 of 1926	18 May 1926
An Ordinance to provide for the making levying and expending of Rates on Land in the Territory for the Seat of Government. (Note: The long title was substituted with "An Ordinance to provide for the levying, imposition and payment of rates and land tax on land in the Territory." by section 4 of the Rates and Land Tax Ordinance 1986 (No. 89).) (Repealed by Rates Act 2004 (No. 3))
Provisional Government Ordinance 1926 (repealed)	No. 7 of 1926	1 July 1926
An Ordinance to amend the Provisional Government Ordinance 1911-1924. (Note: Provisional Government Ordinance 1911 (No. 1)) (Repealed by Liquor Ordinance 1929 (No. 15))
Real Property Ordinance 1926 or the Real Property Act 1926 (repealed)	No. 8 of 1926	8 July 1926
An Ordinance to amend the Real Property Ordinances 1925. (Note: Real Property Ordinances 1925 (No. 1)) (Repealed by Statute Law Amendment Act 2000 (No. 80))
City Area Leases Ordinance (No 2) 1926 (repealed)	No. 9 of 1926	8 July 1926
An Ordinance to amend the City Area Leases Ordinance 1924-1926. (Repealed by City Area Leases Act 1936 (No. 31))
Meat Ordinance 1926 (repealed)	No. 10 of 1926	8 July 1926
An Ordinance to amend the Meat Ordinance 1920. (Note: Meat Ordinance 1920 (No. 1)) (Repealed by Meat Ordinance 1931 (No. 13))
Church of England Lands Ordinance 1926 or the Church of England Lands Act 1926 (repealed)	No. 11 of 1926	28 October 1926
An Ordinance to authorize the execution of an Agreement and a Lease in respect of certain lands. (Repealed by Statute Law Revision (Miscellaneous Provisions) Act 1993 (No. 1))
Leases Ordinance 1926 or the Leases Act 1926 (repealed)	No. 12 of 1926	4 November 1926
An Ordinance to amend the Leases Ordinance 1918-1925. (Note: Leases Ordinance 1918 (No. 2)) (Repealed by Land (Planning and Environment) (Consequential Provisions) Act 1991 (No. 118))
Hawkers Ordinance 1926 (repealed)	No. 13 of 1926	26 November 1926
An Ordinance relating to the Licensing of Hawkers. (Repealed by Hawkers Ordinance 1936 (No. 43))
Lotteries and Art Unions Ordinance 1926 (repealed)	No. 14 of 1926	26 November 1926
An Ordinance relating to Lotteries and Art Unions. (Repealed by Lotteries Ordinance 1964 (No. 13))
Motor Traffic Ordinance 1926 (repealed)	No. 15 of 1926	26 November 1926
An Ordinance to provide for the Registration of Motor Vehicles and the Regulation of Motor Traffic. (Repealed by Motor Traffic Ordinance 1932 (No. 1))
Provisional Government Ordinance 1926 (No. 2) (repealed)	No. 16 of 1926	26 November 1926
An Ordinance to amend the Provisional Government Ordinance 1911-1926. (Repealed by Seat of Government (Administration) Ordinance 1937 (No. 4))
Gun Licence Ordinance 1926 (repealed)	No. 17 of 1926	26 November 1926
An Ordinance to amend the Gun Licence Ordinance 1925. (Note: Gun Licence Ordinance 1925 (No. 14)) (Repealed by Gun Licence Ordinance 1937 (No. 6))
City Area Leases Ordinance (No. 3) 1926 (repealed)	No. 18 of 1926	26 November 1926
An Ordinance to amend the City Area Leases Ordinance 1924-1926. (Repealed by City Area Leases Ordinance 1936 (No. 31))
Industrial Board Ordinance 1926 (No. 2) (repealed)	No. 19 of 1926	26 November 1926
An Ordinance to amend the Industrial Board Ordinance 1922-1926. (Note: Industrial Board Ordinance 1922 (No. 2)) (Repealed by Industrial Board Ordinance 1936 (No. 12))
Trespass on Commonwealth Lands Ordinance 1926 (repealed)	No. 20 of 1926	26 November 1926
An Ordinance to amend the Trespass on Commonwealth Lands Ordinance 1922-1925. (Note: Trespass on Commonwealth Lands Ordinance 1922 (No. 1)) (Repealed by Trespass on Commonwealth Lands Ordinance 1932 (No. 20))
Billiard Saloon Ordinance 1926 (repealed)	No. 21 of 1926	26 November 1926
An Ordinance relating to the Licensing of Billiard Saloons. (Repealed by Ordinances Revision Ordinance 1959 (No. 21))
Trading Hours Ordinance 1926 (repealed)	No. 22 of 1926	2 December 1926
An Ordinance to regulate the Hours of Trading in Shops and the Hours of Employment of Shop Assistants and Carters. (Repealed by Trading Hours Act 1962 (No. 19))

== Sources ==
- "legislation.act.gov.au".
