= List of ordinances of the Australian Capital Territory from 1924 =

This is a list of ordinances enacted by the Governor-General of Australia for the Territory for the Seat of Government (Australian Capital Territory) for the year 19241.

== 1924 ==
Short title, or popular name	Citation	Notified
Long title
Leases Ordinance 1924 (repealed)	No. 1 of 1924	24 January 1924
An Ordinance to amend the Leases Ordinance 1918—1923. (Note: Leases Ordinance 1918 (No. 2)) (Repealed by Leases Ordinance 1925 (No. 4))
Trespass on Commonwealth Lands Ordinance 1924 (repealed)	No. 2 of 1924	20 March 1924
An Ordinance to amend the Trespass on Commonwealth Lands Ordinance 1922-1923 (Note: Trespass on Commonwealth Lands Ordinance 1922 (No. 1)) and for other purposes. (Repealed by Trespass on Commonwealth Lands Ordinance 1932 (No. 20))
Stock Ordinance 1924 (repealed)	No. 3 of 1924	20 March 1924
An Ordinance to amend the Stock Ordinance 1920-1921. (Note: Stock Ordinance 1920 (No. 3)) (Repealed by Stock Ordinance 1934 (No. 9))
Provisional Government Ordinance 1924 (repealed)	No. 4 of 1924	27 March 1924
An Ordinance to amend the Ordinance for the Provisional Government of the Seat of Government (No. 1 of 1911). (Note: Provisional Government Ordinance 1911 (No. 1)) (Repealed by Seat of Government (Administration) Ordinance 1937 (No. 4))
Fire Brigades Ordinance 1924 (repealed)	No. 5 of 1924	27 March 1924
An Ordinance for the care and control of Fire Appliances within the Territory for the Seat of Government. (Repealed by Fire Brigade Ordinance 1957 (No. 20))
City Leases Ordinance 1924 (repealed)	No. 6 of 1924	5 June 1924
An Ordinance to amend the City Leases Ordinance 1921. (Note: City Leases Ordinance 1921 (No. 3)) (Repealed by City Area Leases Ordinance 1924 (No. 8))
Rates Ordinance 1924 (repealed)	No. 7 of 1924	26 June 1924
An Ordinance to amend the Rates Ordinance 1911-1923. (Note: Rates Ordinance 1911 (No. 2)) (Repealed by Rates Ordinance 1926 (No. 6))
City Area Leases Ordinance 1924 (repealed)	No. 8 of 1924	10 October 1924
An Ordinance relating to the Leasing of Commonwealth Lands in the City Area of the Territory. (Repealed by City Area Leases Ordinance 1936 (No. 31))
Building and Services Ordinance 1924 or the Building and Services Act 1924 (repealed)	No. 9 of 1924	10 October 1924
An Ordinance relating to the Erection of Buildings and the Supply of Certain Services. (Repealed by Utilities Act 2000 (No. 65))
Church Lands Leases Ordinance 1924 or the Church Lands Leases Act 1924 (repealed)	No. 10 of 1924	30 October 1924
An Ordinance relating to the Leasing of Commonwealth Lands for Church purposes in the City Area of the Territory. (Repealed by Land (Planning and Environment) (Consequential Provisions) Act 1991 (No. 118))
Cattle Testing Ordinance 1924 (repealed)	No. 11 of 1924	27 November 1924
An Ordinance relating to the Registration and Testing of Cattle. (Repealed by Public Health Ordinance 1930 (No. 18))
Federal Capital Commission's Powers Ordinance 1924 (repealed)	No. 12 of 1924	20 December 1924
An Ordinance to transfer to the Federal Capital Commission the Powers and Functions of the Minister under Ordinances of the Territory, and for other purposes. (Repealed by Ordinances Revision Ordinance 1937 (No. 27))
City Area Leases Ordinance (No. 2) 1924 (repealed)	No. 13 of 1924	20 December 1924
An Ordinance to amend the City Area Leases Ordinance 1924. (Note: City Area Leases Ordinance 1924 (No. 8)) (Repealed by City Area Leases Ordinance 1936 (No. 31))

== Sources ==
- "legislation.act.gov.au".
