= List of ordinances of the Australian Capital Territory from 1914 =

This is a list of ordinances enacted by the Governor-General of Australia for the Territory for the Seat of Government (Australian Capital Territory) for the year 1914.

== 1914 ==
| Short title, or popular name | Citation | Notified |
Long title
| Interpretation Ordinance 1914 (repealed) | No. 1 of 1914 | 11 June 1914 |
An Ordinance for the Interpretation of Ordinances and for the Shortening of their Language. (Repealed by Repealed by Interpretation Ordinance 1937 (No. 29))
| Cotter River Ordinance 1914 or the Cotter River Act 1914 (repealed) | No. 2 of 1914 | 4 July 1914 |
An Ordinance for the Purpose of Preventing the Pollution of the Cotter River. (Repealed by Cotter River Repeal Act 2000 (No. 7))

== Sources ==
- "legislation.act.gov.au".
