= List of ordinances of the Australian Capital Territory from 1919 =

This is a list of ordinances enacted by the Governor-General of Australia for the Territory for the Seat of Government (Australian Capital Territory) for the year 1919.

== 1919 ==
Short title, or popular name	Citation	Notified
Long title
Parks and Gardens Ordinance 1918 (repealed)	No. 1 of 1919	16 January 1919
An Ordinance for the Protection of Public Parks and Gardens. (Repealed by Public Parks Ordinance 1928 (No. 23))
Timber Protection Ordinance 1919 (repealed)	No. 2 of 1919	20 February 1919
An Ordinance for the Protection of Timber. (Repealed by Nature Conservation Ordinance 1980 (No. 20))
Fish Protection Ordinance 1919 (repealed)	No. 3 of 1919	27 March 1919
An Ordinance for the Protection of Fish. (Repealed by Fish Protection Ordinance 1929 (No. 2))
Cotter River Ordinance 1919 or the Cotter River Act 1919 (repealed)	No. 4 of 1919	27 March 1919
An Ordinance to amend the Cotter River Ordinance 1914. (Note: Cotter River Ordinance 1914 (No. 2)) (Repealed by Cotter River Repeal Act 2000 (No. 7))
Interpretation Ordinance 1919 (repealed)	No. 5 of 1919	18 September 1919
An Ordinance to amend the Interpretation Ordinance 1914. (Note: Interpretation Ordinance 1914 (No. 1)) (Repealed by Interpretation Ordinance 1937 (No. 29))
Rabbit Destruction Ordinance 1919 or the Rabbit Destruction River Act 1919 (repealed)	No. 6 of 1919	2 October 1919
An Ordinance relating to the Destruction of Rabbits and Noxious Animals in the Territory for the Seat of Government. (Repealed by Land (Planning and Environment) (Amendment) Act 1997 (No. 7))
Leases Ordinance 1919 or the Leases Act 1919 (repealed)	No. 7 of 1919	13 November 1919
An Ordinance to amend the Leases Ordinance 1918. (Note: Leases Ordinance 1918 (No. 2)) (Repealed by Land (Planning and Environment) (Amendment) Act 1997 (No. 7))

== Sources ==
- "legislation.act.gov.au".
