= List of ordinances of the Australian Capital Territory from 1911 =

This is a list of ordinances enacted by the Governor-General of Australia for the Territory for the Seat of Government (Australian Capital Territory) for the year 1911.

== 1911 ==
Short title, or popular name	Citation	Notified
Long title
Provisional Government Ordinance 1911 (repealed)	No. 1 of 1911	24 December 1910
An Ordinance for the Provisional Government of the Territory of the Seat of Government. (Repealed by Ordinances Revision Ordinance 1937 (No. 27))
Rates Ordinance 1911 (repealed)	No. 2 of 1911	26 October 1911
An Ordinance to provide for the making levying and expending of Rates on Land in the Territory of the Seat of Government. (Repealed by Rates Ordinance 1926 (No. 6))
Rates Ordinance 1911 (No. 2) (repealed)	No. 3 of 1911	13 December 1911
An Ordinance to Amend the Rates Ordinance 1911. (Note: Rates Ordinance 1911 (No. 2)) (Repealed by Rates Ordinance 1926 (No. 6))

== Sources ==
- "legislation.act.gov.au".
