= List of ordinances of the Australian Capital Territory from 1950 =

This is a list of ordinances enacted by the Governor-General of Australia for the Australian Capital Territory for the year 1950.

== 1950 ==
Short title, or popular name	Citation	Notified
Long title
Boarding-houses (Unclaimed Goods) Ordinance 1950 (repealed)	No. 1 of 1950	16 February 1950
An Ordinance Relating to the Disposal of Goods left in Commonwealth Boarding-houses. (Repealed by Ordinances Revision Ordinance 1978 (No. 46))
Building Operations Control Repeal Ordinance 1950 (repealed)	No. 2 of 1950	11 May 1950
An Ordinance to repeal the Building Operations Control Ordinance 1947. (Note: Building Operations Control Ordinance 1947 (No. 3)) (Repealed by Ordinances Revision Ordinance 1978 (No. 46))
United States Educational Foundation in Australia Ordinance 1950 (repealed)	No. 3 of 1950	8 June 1950
An Ordinance to enable the United States Educational Foundation in Australia to acquire and deal with property, and for other purposes. (Repealed by Australian-American Educational Foundation Ordinance 1966 (No. 16))
Medical Practitioners Registration Ordinance 1950 or the Medical Practitioners Registration Act 1950 (repealed)	No. 4 of 1950	27 July 1950
An Ordinance to amend the Medical Practitioners Registration Ordinance 1930-1939. (Note: Medical Practitioners Registration Ordinance 1930 (No. 13)) (Repealed by Statute Law Amendment Act 2000 (No. 80))
Rates Ordinance 1950 or the Rates Act 1950 (repealed)	No. 5 of 1950	10 August 1950
An Ordinance to amend the Rates Ordinance 1926-1938. (Note: Rates Ordinance 1926 (No. 6)) (Repealed by Statute Law Amendment Act 2000 (No. 80))
Tuberculosis Ordinance 1950 or the Tuberculosis Act 1950 (repealed)	No. 6 of 1950	10 August 1950
An Ordinance to provide for and regulate the Examination of Persons suffering or suspected to be suffering from Tuberculosis and for the Prevention and Eradication of Tuberculosis. (Repealed by Health Legislation Amendment Act 2006 (No. 2) (No. 46))
Motor Traffic Ordinance 1950 or the Motor Traffic Act 1950 (repealed)	No. 7 of 1950	26 October 1950
An Ordinance to amend the Motor Traffic Ordinance 1936-1947. (Note: Motor Traffic Ordinance 1936 (No. 45)) (Repealed by Road Transport Legislation Amendment Act 1999 (No. 79))
Police Ordinance 1950 or the Police Act 1950 (repealed)	No. 8 of 1950	16 November 1950
An Ordinance to amend the Police Ordinance 1927-1947. (Note: Police Ordinance 1927 (No. 19)) (Repealed by Crimes (Amendment) Act (No. 2) 1994 (No. 75))
Police Superannuation Ordinance 1950 (repealed)	No. 9 of 1950	16 November 1950
An Ordinance to amend the Police Superannuation Ordinance 1928-1946. (Note: Police Superannuation Ordinance 1928 (No. 16)) (Repealed by Police Pensions Ordinance 1958 (No. 1))
Seat of Government (Administration) Ordinance 1950 (repealed)	No. 10 of 1950	16 November 1950
An Ordinance to amend the Seat of Government (Administration) Ordinance 1930-1941. (Note: Seat of Government (Administration) Ordinance 1930 (No. 5)) (Repealed by Seat of Government (Administration) (Repeal) Ordinance 1989 (No. 43))
Canberra Community Hospital Ordinance 1950 (repealed)	No. 11 of 1950	16 November 1950
An Ordinance to amend the Canberra Community Hospital Ordinance 1938-1947. (Note: Canberra Community Hospital Ordinance 1938 (No. 20)) (Repealed by Health Commission Ordinance 1975 (No. 16))
Meat Ordinance 1950 or the Meat Act 1950 (repealed)	No. 12 of 1950	16 November 1950
An Ordinance to amend the Meat Ordinance 1931-1940. (Note: Meat Ordinance 1931 (No. 13)) (Repealed by Statute Law Amendment Act 2000 (No. 80))
Liquor Ordinance 1950 (repealed)	No. 13 of 1950	30 November 1950
An Ordinance to amend the Liquor Ordinance 1929-1948. (Note: Liquor Ordinance 1929 (No. 15)) (Repealed by Liquor Ordinance 1975 (No. 19))
Co-operative Trading Societies Ordinance 1950 or the Co-operative Trading Societies Act 1950 (repealed)	No. 14 of 1950	21 December 1950
An Ordinance to amend the Co-operative Trading Societies Ordinance 1939-1946. (Note: Co-operative Trading Societies Ordinance 1939 (No. 9)) (Repealed by Statute Law Amendment Act 2000 (No. 80))
Companies (Unclaimed Assets and Moneys) Ordinance 1950 or the Companies (Unclaimed Assets and Moneys) Act 1950 or the Unclaimed Money Act 1950	No. 15 of 1950	21 December 1950
An Ordinance relating to Unclaimed Assets in the Hands of Liquidators of Companies and Unclaimed Moneys held by Companies.
Administration and Probate Ordinance 1950 or the Administration and Probate Act 1950 (repealed)	No. 16 of 1950	21 December 1950
An Ordinance to amend the Administration and Probate Ordinance 1929-1947. (Note: Administration and Probate Ordinance 1929 (No. 18)) (Repealed by Statute Law Amendment Act 2000 (No. 80))
Apprenticeship Ordinance 1950 or the Apprenticeship Act 1950 (repealed)	No. 17 of 1950	21 December 1950
An Ordinance to amend the Apprenticeship Ordinance 1936-1938. (Note: Apprenticeship Ordinance 1936 (No. 11)) (Repealed by Vocational Training Act 1989 (No. 2))
City Area Leases Ordinance 1950 or the City Area Leases Act 1950 (repealed)	No. 18 of 1950	21 December 1950
An Ordinance to amend the City Area Leases Ordinance 1936-1947. (Note: City Area Leases Ordinance 1936 (No. 31 of 1936)) (Repealed by Land (Planning and Environment) (Consequential Provisions) Act 1991 (No. 118))

== Sources ==
- "legislation.act.gov.au".
