= List of ordinances of the Australian Capital Territory from 1937 =

This is a list of ordinances enacted by the Governor-General of Australia for the Territory for the Seat of Government (Australian Capital Territory) for the year 1937.

== 1937 ==
| Short title, or popular name | Citation | Notified |
Long title
| Rates Ordinance 1937 or the Rates Act 1937 (repealed) | No. 1 of 1937 | 28 January 1937 |
An Ordinance to amend the Rates Ordinance 1926-1931, (Note: Rates Ordinance 1926 (No. 6)) as amended by the Seat of Government (Administration) Ordinance, 1930-1933. (Note: Seat of Government (Administration) Ordinance 1930 (No. 5)) (Repealed by Statute Law Amendment Act 2000 (No. 80))
| Roman Catholic Church Property Trust Ordinance 1937 or the Roman Catholic Church Property Trust Act 1937 | No. 2 of 1937 | 18 February 1937 |
An Ordinance relating to Property held upon any Trust for or for the use, benefit or purposes of the Roman Catholic Church in the Territory for the Seat of Government.
| Administration and Probate Ordinance 1937 or the Administration and Probate Act 1937 (repealed) | No. 3 of 1937 | 18 March 1937 |
An Ordinance to amend the Administration and Probate Ordinance 1929-1934. (Note: Administration and Probate Ordinance 1929 (No. 18)) (Repealed by Statute Law Amendment Act 2000 (No. 80))
| Seat of Government (Administration) Ordinance 1937 (repealed) | No. 4 of 1937 | 15 April 1937 |
An Ordinance to amend the Seat of Government (Administration) Ordinance 1930-1933 (Note: Seat of Government (Administration) Ordinance 1930 (No. 5)) and for other purposes. (Repealed by Seat of Government (Administration) (Repeal) Ordinance 1989 (No. 43))
| Court of Petty Sessions Ordinance 1937 or the Court of Petty Sessions Act 1937 (repealed) | No. 5 of 1937 | 27 May 1937 |
An Ordinance to amend the Court of Petty Sessions Ordinance 1930-1934. (Note: Court of Petty Sessions Ordinance (No. 2) 1930 (No. 21)) (Repealed by Statute Law Amendment Act 2000 (No. 80))
| Gun Licence Ordinance 1937 or the Gun Licence Act 1937 (repealed) | No. 6 of 1937 | 17 June 1937 |
An Ordinance relating to the Licensing of Guns and Firearms. (Repealed by Weapons Act 1991 (No. 8))
| Canberra Community Hospital (Inquiry) Ordinance 1937 (repealed) | No. 7 of 1937 | 17 June 1937 |
An Ordinance to authorize the making of an Inquiry into matters concerning the Canberra Community Hospital and for purposes connected therewith. (Repealed by Ordinances Revision Ordinance 1937 (No. 27))
| Canberra Community Hospital Board Ordinance 1937 (repealed) | No. 8 of 1937 | 24 June 1937 |
An Ordinance to amend the Canberra Community Hospital Board Ordinance 1935-1936. (Note: Canberra Community Hospital Board Ordinance 1935 (No. 12)) (Repealed by Canberra Community Hospital Ordinance 1938 (No. 20))
| Unlawful Assemblies Ordinance 1937 (Note: This is a reserved law and cannot be amended or repealed by the Legislative Assembly of the Australian Capital Territory.) (repealed) | No. 9 of 1937 | 22 July 1937 |
An Ordinance in relation to Unlawful Assemblies. (Repealed by Unlawful Assemblies Repeal Ordinance 2001 (No. 2))
| Trespass on Commonwealth Lands Ordinance 1937 or the Trespass on Commonwealth Lands Act 1937 (repealed) | No. 10 of 1937 | 22 July 1937 |
An Ordinance to amend the Trespass on Commonwealth Lands Ordinance 1932. (Note: Trespass on Commonwealth Lands Ordinance 1932 (No. 20)) (Repealed by Statute Law Amendment Act 2000 (No. 80))
| Bank Holidays Ordinance 1937 (repealed) | No. 11 of 1937 | 22 July 1937 |
An Ordinance to amend the Bank Holidays Ordinance 1927-1936. (Note: Bank Holidays Ordinance 1927 (No. 8)) (Repealed by Bank Holidays Ordinance 1952 (No. 3))
| Industrial Board Ordinance 1937 (repealed) | No. 12 of 1937 | 12 August 1937 |
An Ordinance to amend the Industrial Board Ordinances 1936. (Note: Industrial Board Ordinance 1936 (No. 12)) (Repealed by Self-Government (Consequential Amendments) Ordinance 1989 (No. 38))
| Administration and Probate Ordinance (No. 2) 1937 or the Administration and Probate Act (No. 2) 1937 (repealed) | No. 13 of 1937 | 19 August 1937 |
An Ordinance to amend the Administration and Probate Ordinance 1929-1937. (Repealed by Statute Law Amendment Act 2000 (No. 80))
| Unlawful Assemblies Ordinance (No. 2) 1937 (repealed) | No. 14 of 1937 | 19 August 1937 |
An Ordinance to amend the Unlawful Assemblies Ordinance 1937. (Note: Unlawful Assemblies Ordinance 1937 (No. 9)) (Repealed by Unlawful Assemblies Repeal Ordinance 2001 (No. 2))
| Canberra Community Hospital Board Ordinance (No. 2) 1937 (repealed) | No. 15 of 1937 | 23 September 1937 |
An Ordinance to amend the Canberra Community Hospital Board Ordinance 1935-1937. (Repealed by Canberra Community Hospital Ordinance 1938 (No. 20))
| Canberra Community Hospital Board Ordinance (No. 3) 1937 (repealed) | No. 16 of 1937 | 16 September 1937 |
An Ordinance to amend the Canberra Community Hospital Board Ordinance 1935-1936 as amended by the Canberra Community Hospital Board Ordinance 1937 (Note: Canberra Community Hospital Board Ordinance 1937 (No. 8)) and by the Canberra Community Hospital Board Ordinance (No. 2) of 1937. (Note: Canberra Community Hospital Board Ordinance (No. 2) 1937 (No. 15)) (Repealed by Canberra Community Hospital Ordinance 1938 (No. 20))
| Advisory Council Ordinance 1937 (repealed) | No. 17 of 1937 | 16 September 1937 |
An Ordinance to amend the Advisory Council Ordinance 1936. (Note: Advisory Council Ordinance 1936 (No. 49)) (Repealed by Advisory Council Ordinance 1986 (No. 62))
| Dogs Registration Ordinance 1937 (repealed) | No. 18 of 1937 | 9 December 1937 |
An Ordinance to amend the Dogs Registration Ordinance 1926-1936. (Note: Dogs Registration Ordinance 1926 (No. 1)) (Repealed by Dog Control Ordinance 1975 (No. 18))
| Tobacco Ordinance 1937 or the Tobacco Act 1937 (repealed) | No. 19 of 1937 | 16 December 1937 |
An Ordinance to amend the Tobacco Ordinance 1927-1936. (Note: Tobacco Ordinance 1927 (No. 14)) (Repealed by Statute Law Amendment Act 2000 (No. 80))
| Gun Licence Ordinance (No. 2) 1937 or the Gun Licence Act (No. 2) 1937 (repealed) | No. 20 of 1937 | 16 December 1937 |
An Ordinance to amend the Gun Licence Ordinance 1937. (Note: Gun Licence Ordinance 1937 (No. 6)) (Repealed by Weapons Act 1991 (No. 8))
| Rabbit Destruction Ordinance 1937 or the Rabbit Destruction Act 1937 (repealed) | No. 21 of 1937 | 16 December 1937 |
An Ordinance to amend the Rabbit Destruction Ordinance 1919 (Note: Rabbit Destruction Ordinance 1919 (No. 6)) and for other purposes. (Repealed by Land (Planning and Environment) (Amendment) Act 1997 (No. 7))
| Careless Use of Fire Ordinance 1937 or the Careless Use of Fire Act 1937 (repealed) | No. 22 of 1937 | 16 December 1937 |
An Ordinance to amend the Careless Use of Fire Ordinance 1936. (Note: Careless Use of Fire Ordinance 1936 (No. 20)) (Repealed by Statute Law Amendment Act 2000 (No. 80))
| Insane Persons and Inebriates (Committal and Detention) Ordinance 1937 or the Insane Persons and Inebriates (Committal and Detention) Act 1937 (repealed) | No. 23 of 1937 | 16 December 1937 |
An Ordinance to amend the Insane Persons and Inebriates (Committal and Detention) Agreement Ordinance 1936. (Note: Insane Persons and Inebriates (Committal and Detention) Agreement Ordinance 1936 (No. 39)) (Repealed by Statute Law Amendment Act 2000 (No. 80))
| Roads and Public Places Ordinance 1937 or the Roads and Public Places Act 1937 (repealed) | No. 24 of 1937 | 16 December 1937 |
An Ordinance relating to Roads and other Public Places. (Repealed by Public Unleased Land Act 2013 (No. 3))
| Education Ordinance 1937 or the Education Act 1937 (repealed) | No. 25 of 1937 | 16 December 1937 |
An Ordinance relating to Education. (Repealed by Education Act 2004 (No. 17))
| National Memorials Ordinance 1937 (repealed) | No. 26 of 1937 | 23 December 1937 |
An Ordinance to amend the National Memorials Ordinance 1928-1931, (Note: National Memorials Ordinance 1928 (No. 18)) as amended by the Seat of Government (Administration) Ordinance 1930-1937. (Note: Seat of Government (Administration) Ordinance 1930 (No. 5)) (Repealed by Infrastructure and Regional Development (Spent and Redundant Instruments) Repeal Regulation 2014 (Cth))
| Ordinances Revision Ordinance 1937 or the Ordinances Revision Act 1937 or the Acts Revision Act 1937 (repealed) | No. 27 of 1937 | 23 December 1937 |
An Ordinance for the Revision and Amendment of certain Ordinances of the Territory for the Seat of Government. (Repealed by Law Reform (Abolitions and Repeals) Act 1996 (No. 1))
| Court of Petty Sessions Ordinance (No. 2) 1937 or the Court of Petty Sessions Act (No. 2) 1937 (repealed) | No. 28 of 1937 | 23 December 1937 |
An Ordinance to amend the Court of Petty Sessions Ordinance 1930-1937. (Repealed by Statute Law Amendment Act 2000 (No. 80))
| Interpretation Ordinance 1937 (repealed) | No. 29 of 1937 | 23 December 1937 |
An Ordinance for the Interpretation of Ordinances and for the Shortening of their Language. (Repealed by Interpretation (Amendment) Act 1985 (No. 24))
| Canberra Community Hospital Board Ordinance (No. 4) 1937 (repealed) | No. 30 of 1937 | 23 December 1937 |
An Ordinance to amend the Canberra Community Hospital Board Ordinance 1935-1937. (Repealed by Canberra Community Hospital Ordinance 1938 (No. 20))
| Police Offences Ordinance 1937 or the Police Offences Act 1937 (repealed) | No. 31 of 1937 | 23 December 1937 |
An Ordinance to amend the Police Offences Ordinance 1930-1934. (Note: Police Offences Ordinance 1930 (No. 9)) (Repealed by Law Reform (Abolitions and Repeals) Act 1996 (No. 1))
| Traffic Ordinance 1937 or the Traffic Act 1937 (repealed) | No. 32 of 1937 | 23 December 1937 |
An Ordinance Relating to the Regulation of Traffic. (Repealed by Road Transport Legislation Amendment Act 1999 (No. 79))
| Protection of Lands Ordinance 1937 or the Protection of Lands Act 1937 (repealed) | No. 33 of 1937 | 23 December 1937 |
An Ordinance to provide for the Protection of Commonwealth Lands. (Repealed by Statute Law Amendment Act 2001 (No. 11))

== Sources ==
- "legislation.act.gov.au".
