= List of ordinances of the Australian Capital Territory from 1954 =

This is a list of ordinances enacted by the Governor-General of Australia for the Australian Capital Territory for the year 1954.

== 1954 ==
Short title, or popular name	Citation	Notified
Long title
Marriage Ordinance 1953 (repealed)	No. 1 of 1954	7 January 1954
An Ordinance to amend the Marriage Ordinance 1929-1938. (Note: Marriage Ordinance 1929 (No. 21)) (Repealed by Ordinances Revision Ordinance 1977 (No. 65))
Administration and Probate Ordinance (No. 2) 1953 or the Administration and Probate Act (No. 2) 1953 (repealed)	No. 2 of 1954	7 January 1954
An Ordinance to amend the Administration and Probate Ordinance 1929-1950, (Note: Administration and Probate Ordinance 1929 (No. 18)) as amended by the Administration and Probate Ordinance 1953. (Note: Administration and Probate Ordinance 1953 (No. 5)) (Repealed by Statute Law Amendment Act 2000 (No. 80))
Scaffolding and Lifts Ordinance (No. 2) 1953 (repealed)	No. 3 of 1954	7 January 1954
An Ordinance to amend the Scaffolding and Lifts Ordinance 1941-1946, (Note: Scaffolding and Lifts Ordinance 1941 (No. 3)) as amended by the Scaffolding and Lifts Ordinance 1953. (Note: Scaffolding and Lifts Ordinance 1953 (No. 13)) (Repealed by Scaffolding and Lifts Ordinance 1957 (No. 8))
Royal Visit Holiday Ordinance 1954 (repealed)	No. 4 of 1954	4 February 1954
An Ordinance to Proclaim a Holiday in Celebration of the Royal Visit. (Repealed by Holidays Ordinance 1958 (No. 19))
Police Ordinance 1954 or the Police Act 1954 (repealed)	No. 5 of 1954	4 February 1954
An Ordinance to amend the Police Ordinance 1927-1950. (Note: Police Ordinance 1927 (No. 19)) (Repealed by Crimes (Amendment) Act (No. 2) 1994 (No. 75)
Careless Use of Fire Ordinance 1954 or the Careless Use of Fire Act 1954 (repealed)	No. 6 of 1954	11 February 1954
An Ordinance to amend the Careless Use of Fire Ordinance 1936-1952. (Note: Careless Use of Fire Ordinance 1936 (No. 20)) (Repealed by Statute Law Amendment Act 2000 (No. 80))
Liquor Ordinance 1954 (repealed)	No. 7 of 1954	16 February 1954
An Ordinance to amend the Liquor Ordinance 1929-1951. (Note: Liquor Ordinance 1929 (No. 15)) (Repealed by Liquor Ordinance 1975 (No. 19))
Aborigines Welfare Ordinance 1954 (repealed)	No. 8 of 1954	16 February 1954
An Ordinance relating to Aborigines. (Repealed by Aborigines Welfare Repeal Ordinance 1965 (No. 16))
Medical Practitioners Registration Ordinance 1954 or the Medical Practitioners Registration Act 1954 (repealed)	No. 9 of 1954	5 April 1954
An Ordinance to amend the Medical Practitioners Registration Ordinance 1930-1950. (Note: Medical Practitioners Registration Ordinance 1930 (No. 13)) (Repealed by Statute Law Amendment Act 2000 (No. 80))
Dentists Registration Ordinance 1954 or the Dentists Registration Act 1954 (repealed)	No. 10 of 1954	5 April 1954
An Ordinance to amend the Dentists Registration Ordinance 1931-1937. (Note: Dentists Registration Ordinance 1931 (No. 8)) (Repealed by Statute Law Amendment Act 2000 (No. 80))
Foreign Judgments (Reciprocal Enforcement) Ordinance 1954 or the Foreign Judgments (Reciprocal Enforcement) Act 1954 (repealed)	No. 11 of 1954	14 April 1954
An Ordinance relating to the Enforcement of Foreign judgments in the Territory and for other purposes. (Repealed by Statute Law Revision Act 1994 (No. 26))
Workmen's Compensation Ordinance 1954 or the Workmen's Compensation Act 1954 (repealed)	No. 12 of 1954	3 June 1954
An Ordinance to amend the Workmen's Compensation Ordinance 1951-1952, (Note: Workmen's Compensation Ordinance 1951 (No. 2)) and for other purposes. (Repealed by Statute Law Amendment Act 2000 (No. 80))
Poisons and Dangerous Drugs Ordinance 1954 or the Poisons and Dangerous Drugs Act 1954 (repealed)	No. 13 of 1954	10 June 1954
An Ordinance to amend the Poisons and Dangerous Drugs Ordinance 1933-1938. (Note: Poisons and Dangerous Drugs Ordinance 1933 (No. 37)) (Repealed by Statute Law Amendment Act 2000 (No. 80))
Companies Ordinance 1954 (repealed)	No. 14 of 1954	20 August 1954
An Ordinance relating to Companies. (Repealed by Companies Ordinance 1962 (No. 7))
Sale of Goods Ordinance 1954 or the Sale of Goods Act 1954	No. 15 of 1954	12 August 1954
An Ordinance relating to the Sale of Goods.
Trustee Companies Ordinance 1954 or the Trustee Companies Act 1954 (repealed)	No. 16 of 1954	26 August 1954
An Ordinance to amend the Trustee Companies Ordinance 1947. (Note: Trustee Companies Ordinance 1947 (No. 15)) (Repealed by Statute Law Amendment Act 2000 (No. 80))

== Sources ==
- "legislation.act.gov.au".
