= List of ordinances of the Australian Capital Territory from 1990 =

This is a list of ordinances enacted by the Governor-General of Australia for the Australian Capital Territory for the year 1990.

== 1990 ==
Short title, or popular name	Citation	Notified
Long title
Crimes (Amendment) Ordinance 1990 or the Crimes (Amendment) Act 1990 (repealed)	No. 1 of 1990	23 May 1990
An Ordinance to amend the Crimes Act, 1900 (Note: Crimes Act 1900 (No. 40 (NSW))) of the State of New South Wales in its application to the Territory, and for related purposes. (Repealed by Statute Law Amendment Act 2000 (No. 80))
Crimes (Amendment) Ordinance (No. 2) 1990 or the Crimes (Amendment) Act (No. 2) 1990 (repealed)	No. 2 of 1990	23 May 1990
An Ordinance to amend the Crimes Act, 1900 of the State of New South Wales in its application to the Territory. (Repealed by Statute Law Amendment Act 2000 (No. 80))
Legal Practitioners (Amendment) Ordinance 1990 or the Legal Practitioners (Amendment) Act 1990 (repealed)	No. 3 of 1990	23 May 1990
An Ordinance to amend the Legal Practitioners Ordinance 1970. (Note: Legal Practitioners Ordinance 1970 (No. 43)) (Repealed by Statute Law Amendment Act 2000 (No. 80))
Evidence (Amendment) Ordinance 1990 or the Evidence (Amendment) Act 1990 (repealed)	No. 4 of 1990	27 June 1990
An Ordinance to amend the Evidence Ordinance 1971 (Note: Evidence Ordinance 1971 (No. 4)) and for related purposes. (Repealed by Statute Law Amendment Act 2000 (No. 80))
Self-Government (Consequential Amendments) Ordinance 1990 or the Self-Government (Consequential Amendments) Act 1990 (repealed)	No. 5 of 1990	27 June 1990
An Ordinance to amend certain laws of the Territory consequent upon the conversion of those laws into enactments and for other purposes. (Repealed by Statute Law Amendment Act 2001 (No. 11))
Evidence (Closed Circuit Television) (Amendment) Ordinance 1990 (Note: This is a reserved law and cannot be amended or repealed by the Legislative Assembly of the Australian Capital Territory.) (repealed)	No. 6 of 1990	27 June 1990
An Ordinance to amend the Evidence (Closed Circuit Television) Ordinance 1989 (Note: Evidence (Closed Circuit Television) Ordinance 1989 (No. 53)) and for a related purpose. (Repealed by Reserved Laws (Administration) (Amendment and Repeal) Ordinance 1994 (No. 6))
Coroners (Amendment) Ordinance 1990 or the Coroners (Amendment) Act 1990 (repealed)	No. 7 of 1990	29 June 1990
An Ordinance to amend the Coroners Ordinance 1956. (Note: Coroners Ordinance 1956 (No. 14)) (Repealed by [[]] (No. ))
Supreme Court (Arbitration) Ordinance 1990 (repealed)	No. 8 of 1990	29 June 1990
An Ordinance to prescribe matters for Rules of Court relating to arbitration. (Repealed by Supreme Court (Arbitration) (Repeal) Ordinance 1994 (No. 7))
Magistrates Court (Appeals Against Sentence) Ordinance 1990 or the Magistrates Court (Appeals Against Sentence) Act 1990 (repealed)	No. 9 of 1990	29 June 1990
An Ordinance to amend certain Ordinances to make provision for appeals against sentences imposed by the Magistrates Court and for related purposes. (Repealed by Statute Law Amendment Act 2001 (No. 11))
Evidence (Amendment) Ordinance (No. 2) 1990 or the Evidence (Amendment) Act (No. 2) 1990 (repealed)	No. 10 of 1990	29 June 1990
An Ordinance to amend the Evidence Ordinance 1971. (Repealed by Statute Law Amendment Act 2000 (No. 80))
Legal Practitioners (Amendment) Ordinance (No. 2) 1990 or the Legal Practitioners (Amendment) Act (No. 2) 1990 (repealed)	No. 11 of 1990	4 July 1990
An Ordinance to amend the Legal Practitioners Ordinance 1970. (Repealed by Statute Law Amendment Act 2000 (No. 80))
Companies (Registered Societies) Ordinance 1990 (repealed)	No. 12 of 1990	1 August 1990
An Ordinance to apply certain provisions of the Companies Act 1981 (Note: Companies Act 1981 (No. 89 (Cth))) of the Commonwealth to companies registered under section 38A of the Co-operative Societies Act 1939 (Note: Co-operative Trading Societies Ordinance 1939 (No. 9)) of the Territory and for related purposes. (Repealed by Companies Ordinances Repeal Ordinance 2006 (No. 1))

== Sources ==
- "legislation.act.gov.au".
