= List of ordinances of the Australian Capital Territory from 1933 =

This is a list of ordinances enacted by the Governor-General of Australia for the Territory for the Seat of Government (Australian Capital Territory) for the year 1933.

== 1933 ==
Short title, or popular name	Citation	Notified
Long title
Nurses Registration Ordinance 1933 (repealed)	No. 1 of 1933	12 January 1933
An Ordinance to provide for the Registration of Persons engaged in the Practice of Nursing. (Repealed by Nurses Ordinance 1988 (No. 61))
Hospital Tax Ordinance 1933 (repealed)	No. 2 of 1933	9 February 1933
An Ordinance to impose a Hospital Tax and for other purposes. (Repealed by Hospital Tax Ordinance 1935 (No. 13))
Removal of Prisoners Ordinance 1933 (repealed)	No. 3 of 1933	14 February 1933
An Ordinance to provide for the appointment of an Administrator of the Territory for the Seat of Government for the purposes of the Removal of Prisoners (Territories) Act 1923. (Note: Removal of Prisoners (Territories) Act 1923 (Cth)) (Repealed by Ordinances Revision Ordinance 1977 (No. 65))
Seat of Government (Administration) Ordinance 1933 (repealed)	No. 4 of 1933	2 March 1933
An Ordinance to amend the Seat of Government (Administration) Ordinance 1930-1931. (Note: Seat of Government (Administration) Ordinance 1930 (No. 5)) (Repealed by Seat of Government (Administration) (Repeal) Ordinance 1989 (No. 43))
Meat Ordinance 1933 or the Meat Act 1933 (repealed)	No. 5 of 1933	16 March 1933
An Ordinance to amend the Meat Ordinance 1931. (Note: Meat Ordinance 1931 (No. 13)) (Repealed by Statute Law Amendment Act 2000 (No. 80))
Hospital Tax Ordinance (No. 2) 1933 (repealed)	No. 6 of 1933	16 March 1933
An Ordinance to amend the Hospital Tax Ordinance 1933. (Note: Hospital Tax Ordinance 1933 (No. 2)) (Repealed by Hospital Tax Ordinance 1935 (No. 13))
Juries Ordinance 1933 (repealed)	No. 7 of 1933	12 April 1933
An Ordinance to amend the Juries Ordinances 1932. (Note: Juries Ordinance 1932 (No. 25)) (Repealed by Juries Ordinance 1967 (No. 47))
Judgment Creditors Remedies Ordinance 1933 or the Judgment Creditors Remedies Act 1933 (repealed)	No. 8 of 1933	13 April 1933
An Ordinance relating to the Remedies of Judgment Creditors. (Repealed by Statute Law Amendment Act 2003 (No. 2) (No. 56))
Administration and Probate Ordinance 1933 or the Administration and Probate Act 1933 (repealed)	No. 9 of 1933	4 May 1933
An Ordinance to amend the Administration and Probate Ordinance 1929-1932. (Note: Administration and Probate Ordinance 1929 (No. 18)) (Repealed by Statute Law Amendment Act 2000 (No. 80))
Advisory Council Ordinance 1933 (repealed)	No. 10 of 1933	18 May 1933
An Ordinance relating to the Term of Office of elected members of the Advisory Council. (Repealed by Advisory Council Ordinance (No. 2) 1933 (No. 20))
Dogs Registration Ordinance 1933 (repealed)	No. 11 of 1933	22 June 1933
An Ordinance to amend the Dogs Registration Ordinance 1926. (Note: Dogs Registration Ordinance 1926 (No. 1)) (Repealed by Dog Control Ordinance 1975 (No. 18))
Industrial Board Ordinance 1933 (repealed)	No. 12 of 1933	22 June 1933
An Ordinance to amend the Industrial Board Ordinance 1922-1932. (Note: Industrial Board Ordinance 1922 (No. 2)) (Repealed by Industrial Board Ordinance 1936 (No. 12))
Nurses Registration Ordinance (No. 2) 1933 (repealed)	No. 13 of 1933	29 June 1933
An Ordinance to amend the Nurses Registration Ordinance 1933. (Note: Nurses Registration Ordinance 1933 (No. 1)) (Repealed by Nurses Ordinance 1988 (No. 61))
Land Commissioner Ordinance 1933 (repealed)	No. 14 of 1933	13 July 1933
An Ordinance relating to the appointment of a Land Commissioner. (Repealed by Land Valuation Act 1936 (No. 30))
Leases Ordinance 1933 or the Leases Act 1933 (repealed)	No. 15 of 1933	13 July 1933
An Ordinance to amend the Leases Ordinance 1918-1927. (Note: Leases Ordinance 1918 (No. 2)) (Repealed by Land (Planning and Environment) (Consequential Provisions) Act 1991 (No. 118))
Weights and Measures Ordinance 1933 or the Weights and Measures Act 1933 (repealed)	No. 16 of 1933	13 July 1933
An Ordinance to amend the Weights and Measures Ordinance 1929-1932. (Note: Weights and Measures Ordinance 1929 (No. 9)) (Repealed by Trade Measurement (Amendment) Act 1995 (No. 5))
Hospital Tax Ordinance (No. 3) 1933 (repealed)	No. 17 of 1933	13 July 1933
An Ordinance to amend the Hospital Tax Ordinance 1933, as amended by the Hospital Tax Ordinance (No. 2) 1933. (Note: Hospital Tax Ordinance (No. 2) 1933 (No. 6)) (Repealed by Hospital Tax Ordinance 1935 (No. 13))
Workmen's Compensation Ordinance 1933 (repealed)	No. 18 of 1933	13 July 1933
An Ordinance To amend the Workmen's Compensation Ordinance 1931. (Note: Workmen's Compensation Ordinance 1931 (No. 22)) (Repealed by Workmen's Compensation Ordinance 1946 (No. 2))
Workmen's Compensation Ordinance (No. 2) 1933 (repealed)	No. 19 of 1933	7 September 1933
An Ordinance to amend the Workmen's Compensation Ordinance 1931, as amended by the Seat of Government (Administration) Ordinance 1933 (Note: Seat of Government (Administration) Ordinance 1933 (No. 4)) and by the Workmen's Compensation Ordinance 1933. (Note: Workmen's Compensation Ordinance 1933 (No. 18)) (Repealed by Workmen's Compensation Ordinance 1946 (No. 2))
Advisory Council Ordinance (No. 2) 1933 (repealed)	No. 20 of 1933	14 September 1933
An Ordinance relating to the Term of Office of elected members of the Advisory Council. (Repealed by Advisory Council Ordinance 1986 (No. 7))
Pharmacy Ordinance 1933 or the Pharmacy Act 1933 (repealed)	No. 21 of 1933	28 September 1933
An Ordinance to amend the Pharmacy Ordinance 1931. (Note: Pharmacy Ordinance 1931 (No. 10)) (Repealed by Statute Law Amendment Act 2000 (No. 80))
Dentists Registration Ordinance 1933 or the Dentists Registration Act 1933 (repealed)	No. 22 of 1933	28 September 1933
An Ordinance to amend the Dentists Registration Ordinance 1931-1932. (Note: Dentists Registration Ordinance 1931 (No. 8)) (Repealed by Statute Law Amendment Act 2000 (No. 80))
Medical Practitioners Registration Ordinance 1933 or the Medical Practitioners Registration Act 1933 (repealed)	No. 23 of 1933	28 September 1933
An Ordinance to amend the Medical Practitioners Registration Ordinance 1930-1931. (Note: Medical Practitioners Registration Ordinance 1930 (No. 13)) (Repealed by Statute Law Amendment Act 2000 (No. 80))
Lotteries and Art Unions Ordinance 1933 (repealed)	No. 24 of 1933	26 October 1933
An Ordinance to amend the Lotteries and Art Unions Ordinance 1926-1929. (Note: Lotteries and Art Unions Ordinance 1926 (No. 14)) (Repealed by Lotteries Ordinance 1964 (No. 13))
Instruments Ordinance 1933 or the Instruments Act 1933 (repealed)	No. 25 of 1933	16 November 1933
An Ordinance relating to Instruments and Securities. (Repealed by Personal Property Securities Act 2010 (No. 15))
Real Property Ordinance 1933 or the Real Property Act 1933 (repealed)	No. 26 of 1933	16 November 1933
An Ordinance to amend the Real Property Ordinance 1925-1930. (Note: Real Property Ordinance 1925 (No. 1)) (Repealed by Statute Law Amendment Act 2000 (No. 80))
Leases Ordinance (No. 2) 1933 or the Leases Act (No. 2) 1933 (repealed)	No. 27 of 1933	16 November 1933
An Ordinance to amend the Leases Ordinance 1918-1927, as amended by the Leases Ordinance 1933 (Note: Leases Ordinance 1933 (No. 15)), and to amend the Leases Ordinance 1933. (Repealed by Land (Planning and Environment) (Consequential Provisions) Act 1991 (No. 118))
Land Commissioner Ordinance (No. 2) 1933 (repealed)	No. 28 of 1933	23 November 1933
An Ordinance to amend the Land Commissioner Ordinance 1933. (Note: Land Commissioner Ordinance 1933 (No. 14)) (Repealed by Ordinances Revision Ordinance 1937 (No. 27))
Cemeteries Ordinance 1933 or the Cemeteries Act 1933 (repealed)	No. 29 of 1933	23 November 1933
An Ordinance relating to the Establishment, Management and Control of Cemeteries. (Repealed by Cemeteries and Crematoria Act 2003 (No. 11))
Stock Diseases Ordinance 1933 or the Stock Diseases Act 1933 (repealed)	No. 30 of 1933	30 November 1933
An Ordinance relating to Diseases in Stock. (Repealed by Animal Diseases Act 1993 (No. 61))
Business Names Ordinance 1933 (repealed)	No. 31 of 1933	30 November 1933
An Ordinance relating to the Registration of Firms and Persons carrying on Business under Business Names, and relating to the Names, Styles, Titles or Designations under which Businesses are carried on. (Repealed by Business Names Ordinance 1956 (No. 18))
Interpretation Ordinance 1933 (repealed)	No. 32 of 1933	30 November 1933
An Ordinance to amend the Interpretation Ordinance 1914-1930. (Note: Interpretation Ordinance 1914 (No. 1)) (Repealed by Interpretation Ordinance 1937 (No. 29))
Motor Traffic Ordinance 1933 (repealed)	No. 33 of 1933	7 December 1933
An Ordinance to amend the Motor Traffic Ordinance 1932, (Note: Motor Traffic Ordinance 1932 (No. 1)) as amended by the Seat of Government (Administration) Ordinance 1933. (Repealed by Motor Traffic Ordinance 1936 (No. 45))
Real Property Ordinance (No. 2) 1933 or the Real Property Act (No. 2) 1933 (repealed)	No. 34 of 1933	7 December 1933
An Ordinance to amend the Real Property Ordinance 1925-1933. (Repealed by Statute Law Amendment Act 2000 (No. 80))
Instruments Ordinance (No 2) 1933 or the Instruments Act (No 2) 1933 (repealed)	No. 35 of 1933	7 December 1933
An Ordinance to amend the Instruments Ordinance 1933. (Note: Instruments Ordinance 1933 (No. 25)) (Repealed by Statute Law Amendment Act 2000 (No. 80))
Judiciary (Stay of Proceedings) Ordinance 1933 or the Judiciary (Stay of Proceedings) Act 1933 (repealed)	No. 36 of 1933	7 December 1933
An Ordinance relating to the Jurisdiction and the Execution of the Process of the Courts of the Territory. (Repealed by Court Procedures (Consequential Amendments) Act 2004 (No. 60))
Poisons and Dangerous Drugs Ordinance 1933 or the Poisons Ordinance 1933 or the Poisons Act 1933 (repealed)	No. 37 of 1933	21 December 1933
An Ordinance relating to the Control, Sale and Use of Poisons, Narcotic Drugs and Poisonous Substances, and for other purposes. (Repealed by Medicines, Poisons and Therapeutic Goods Act 2008 (No. 26))
Supreme Court (Ordinances Modifying) Ordinance 1933 (repealed)	No. 38 of 1933	29 December 1933
An Ordinance to provide for the Modification of the Provisions of certain Ordinances in relation to the exercise of the Jurisdiction of the Supreme Court. (Repealed by Ordinances Revision Ordinance 1937 (No. 27))
Juries Ordinance (No. 2) 1933 (repealed)	No. 39 of 1933	29 December 1933
An Ordinance to amend the Juries Ordinance 1932-1933. (Repealed by Juries Ordinance 1967 (No. 47))
Matrimonial Causes Ordinance 1933 (repealed)	No. 40 of 1933	29 December 1933
An Ordinance to amend the Matrimonial Causes Ordinance 1932. (Note: Matrimonial Causes Ordinance 1932 (No. 22)) (Repealed by Ordinances Revision Ordinance 1977 (No. 65))

== Sources ==
- "legislation.act.gov.au".
