= Anne Johnson (disambiguation) =

Anne Johnson is a British archaeologist and researcher.

Ann(e) Johnson may also refer to:

- Anne Johnson Davis (died 2010), American author and public speaker
- Dame Anne Mandall Johnson (born 1954), British epidemiologist
- Anne-Marie Johnson (born 1960), American actress
- Ann Johnson (athlete) (born 1933), British sprinter
- Ann Johnson (politician) (born 1974), American politician
- Ann Johnson (dancer); see Savoy-style Lindy Hop
- Ann Johnson Stewart (born 1964), American democratic politician, university professor and civil engineer
- Ann Jennings Johnson (1745–1794), First Lady of Maryland

== See also ==
- Annie Johnson (disambiguation)
- Anne Johnston (disambiguation)
- Anna Johnson (disambiguation)
- Anne Johnstone (disambiguation)
