= ANU Medical School =

ANU Medical School (ANUMS)
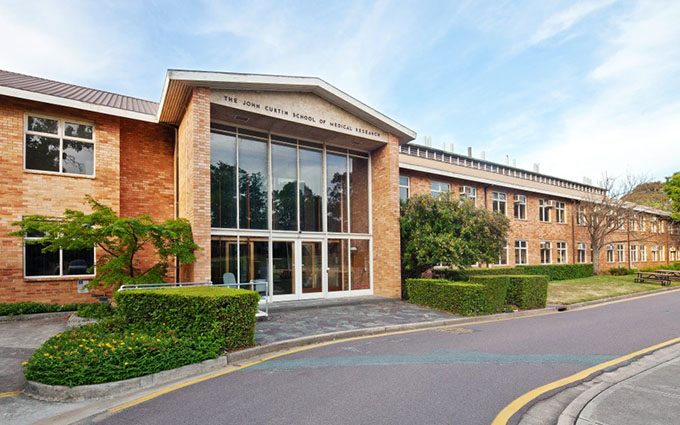
- The ANU Medical School building.
- Type: Public university college graduate medical school
- Established: November 2003; 22 years ago
- Parent institution: Australian National University
- Academic affiliations: The Canberra Hospital; John Curtin School of Medical Research
- Dean: Professor Imogen Mitchell
- Deputy Dean: Professor Zsuzsoka Kecskes
- Administrative staff: 200
- Students: 400
- Location: Acton, Canberra, Australian Capital Territory, 2601, Australia; 35°16′34″S 149°07′01″E
- Campus: Urban
- Website: medicalschool.anu.edu.au

The ANU Medical School (ANUMS) is a graduate medical school of the Australian National University, a public university located in Canberra, in the Australian Capital Territory. Established in November 2003 following accreditation by the Australian Medical Council (AMC), ANUMS commenced offering studies in the Bachelor of Medicine, Bachelor of Surgery (M.B., B.S.) (Latin: Medicinae Baccalaureus et Chirurgiae Baccalaureus) program and, under the leadership of the Foundation Dean, Professor Paul Gatenby, the first cohort of students commenced in February 2004. In January 2014 the AMC approved the ANU Medical School changing its medical program to the award of the MChD (Latin: Medicinae ac Chirurgiae Doctoranda) program.

The current Dean of Medicine is Professor Imogen Mitchell and Deputy Dean of Medicine Professor Zsuzsoka Kecskes.

== History ==
Walter Burley Griffin’s plan for the design of Canberra not only designated Acton Peninsula as a hospital site, but did so whilst simultaneously placing it adjacent to a university where he envisaged a medical school would be located. One of the best extant sources of evidence of the geometry and intent of Walter Burley Griffin’s formally adopted plan for Canberra, is set out in the Report of Federal Capital City Designs of the Board of the Parliament of the Commonwealth of Australia (1912).

“Black Mountain rising almost directly out of the waters at the Western end of the “Water Axis,” is set off from the formal pool by the University and surrounding Professional schools…it will be noted that fundamental sciences, descriptive of nature lead directly to the theoretical sciences dependent on them…Some such arrangement is necessary to permit proper expansion in these changing fields, with convenience to students. Moreover, it is endeavoured to direct these lines on the site to such fields for actual application as are more available to them…Thus from Physiology and Gymnasia open onto the broad flat athletic grounds and the water areas and the Hospital, of itself in a most suitable isolated location with equable temperature and atmospheric conditions is adjoined by the Medical, Surgical, Pharmaceutic schools."

The Canberra Community Hospital on Acton Peninsula (which was later named the Royal Canberra Hospital) had possessed a Department of Clinical Science since 1965, its foundation professor being Malcolm Whyte and its laboratories being linked to the Australian National University's (ANU) John Curtin School of Medical Research. Amongst others, Dr Marcus de Laune Faunce advocated that the Royal Canberra Hospital be linked with a medical school at the ANU.

In the early 1970s the ANU narrowly missed out on a medical school, which went to the University of Newcastle. HM Whyte in a study of the early moves for a university medical school in Canberra details how the proposal was initiated by a question addressed to the ANU by the director-general of health in 1963, considered by hospital and university committees, approved by a report in 1965, bolstered by an international conference in 1968, encouraged by the Universities Commission and fleshed out into a formal submission to the Universities Commission in 1971. A government-funded feasibility study commenced in 1974 and reported in 1976. In July 1976, however, the ANU University Council decided: "in view of recent statements on funding for universities...there was no advantage to be had in developing further at present the study so far undertaken". The 1980s had seen an involvement in the teaching of a small cohort of final-year students from the University of Queensland in Canberra, and in 1993 the University of Sydney began to develop its Canberra Clinical School.

In April 2001, after intense public debate and a committee of inquiry lasting eight months, it was announced that the Australian National University was to develop Australia's 12th and the world's 896th medical school. Shortly afterwards staff at the medical school made a proposal to the National Capital Authority that the old hospice and isolation block facilities on Acton Peninsula (which had been heritage listed for a health use) should be leased to the Medical School for teaching and clinical purposes.

== Structure ==
The first enrolment was in 2004. The ANUMS program is a four-year graduate medical degree, being thematic in concept and using problem based learning as the principal method of instruction particularly in the first two years.

The themes include:

- Medical Sciences - 45%
- Clinical Skills - 30%
- Population Health - 15%
- Professionalism and Leadership - 10%

These themes were selected as being important knowledge and professional domains that medical graduates will need in the 21st century. Doctors require competency in basic medical sciences such as anatomy and physiology as well as defined clinical skills. This includes communicating with patients and their relatives, being able to elicit a history, examine a patient and use the principles of evidence based practice. Population health grows in importance as the world's population grows; doctors must appreciate that there are perspectives different from their individual patients' and that great health gains are really only made at the population level. Doctors also require an understanding of health law medical ethics and international human rights as well as an ability to reflect on their own performance and capacity.

Teaching is on the ANU campus, particularly in the first two years. Patient contact is from early in the course with much of the last two years taught in the health sector, both in the ACT and in surrounding NSW. In the ACT the principal teaching hospital is the Canberra Hospital. Students also go to Calvary Hospital, to facilities of ACT Community Care and selected general practices. In surrounding NSW a Rural Clinical School has been established. A select group of students will be invited to spend the third year of the course in a rural curriculum that runs parallel to the urban based curriculum.

The ANU Medical School has links with the ACT Department of Health and Community Care and the Southern Area Health Service of the NSW Health system. Canberra, the "bush capital", is very close to the small population centres of south-eastern NSW. The school takes advantage of the diversity of the surrounding area and provides rural experience from very early in the course in locations such as Yass, Queanbeyan, Bega, Batemans Bay, Goulburn and Cooma, all of which are within a few hours' travelling distance of Canberra, as well as Young. Students have the opportunity to spend one of their clinical years in a rural setting, learning medicine, surgery, obstetrics and gynaecology synchronously while their urban colleagues rotate through traditional blocs.

== Admission ==
Admission was previously via a combination of grade point average (GPA) of a previous undergraduate degree and the Graduate Australian Medical School Admissions Test (GAMSAT) weighted 50:50 and a pass/fail interview. From 2013 entry onwards, the GPA and GAMSAT score are weighted 50:50 to produce a ranked list of applicants for the interview, and offers of place are based on a total score of 50:50 weighting of the composite score (used for the interview ranking) and the interview score. Places include Commonwealth Supported Places (CSP), Bonded Medical Places (BMP), Medical Rural Bonded Places (MRBS) and International Full Fee Places (IFP).

== Teaching hospitals ==
Clinical schools are based at the following major teaching hospitals affiliated with the ANU Medical School:

- The Canberra Hospital
- Sydney Adventist Hospital
- National Capital Private Hospital
- Calvary Hospital
- Calvary John James Hospital
- Calvary Private Hospital
- Canberra Eye Hospital
- Goulburn Base Hospital
- Batemans Bay Hospital

A number of other smaller hospitals also act as teaching hospitals to participate in rural medical education in the ACT and SE NSW region.
