= List of ordinances of the Australian Capital Territory from 1940 =

This is a list of ordinances enacted by the Governor-General of Australia for the Australian Capital Territory for the year 1940.

== 1940 ==
| Short title, or popular name | Citation | Notified |
Long title
| Industrial Board Ordinance 1940 (repealed) | No. 1 of 1940 | 8 February 1940 |
An Ordinance to amend the Industrial Board Ordinance 1936-1939. (Note: Industrial Board Ordinance 1936 (No. 12)) (Repealed by Self-Government (Consequential Amendments) Ordinance 1989 (No. 38))
| Adoption of Children Ordinance 1940 (repealed) | No. 2 of 1940 | 15 February 1940 |
An Ordinance to amend the Adoption of Children Ordinance 1938. (Note: Adoption of Children Ordinance 1938 (No. 2)) (Repealed by Adoption of Children Ordinance 1965 (No. 15))
| Canberra University College Ordinance 1940 (repealed) | No. 3 of 1940 | 15 February 1940 |
An Ordinance to amend the Canberra University College Ordinance 1929-1936. (Note: Canberra University College Ordinance 1929 (No. 20)) (Repealed by Canberra University College Ordinance 1953 (No. 8))
| Police Superannuation Ordinance 1940 (repealed) | No. 4 of 1940 | 14 March 1940 |
An Ordinance to amend the Police Superannuation Ordinance 1928-1939. (Note: Police Superannuation Ordinance 1928 (No. 16)) (Repealed by Police Pensions Ordinance 1958 (No. 58))
| Canberra Community Hospital Ordinance 1940 (repealed) | No. 5 of 1940 | 18 April 1940 |
An Ordinance to amend the Canberra Community Hospital Ordinance 1938-1939. (Note: Canberra Community Hospital Ordinance 1938 (No. 20)) (Repealed by Health Commission Ordinance 1975 (No. 75))
| Meat Ordinance 1940 or the Meat Act 1940 (repealed) | No. 6 of 1940 | 2 May 1940 |
An Ordinance to amend the Meat Ordinance 1931-1933. (Note: Meat Ordinance 1931 (No. 13)) (Repealed by Statute Law Amendment Act 2000 (No. 80))
| Careless Use of Fire Ordinance 1940 or the Careless Use of Fire Act 1940 (repealed) | No. 7 of 1940 | 2 May 1940 |
An Ordinance to amend the Careless Use of Fire Ordinance 1936-1937. (Note: Careless Use of Fire Ordinance 1936 (No. 20)) (Repealed by Statute Law Amendment Act 2000 (No. 80))
| Regulations Publication Ordinance 1940 (repealed) | No. 8 of 1940 | 23 May 1940 |
An Ordinance relating to the Publication of Regulations. (Repealed by Interpretation Ordinance 1967 (No. 48))
| Juvenile Offenders (Probation) Ordinance 1940 (repealed) | No. 9 of 1940 | 30 May 1940 |
An Ordinance relating to Juvenile Offenders on Probation. (Repealed by Child Welfare Ordinance 1957 (No. 1))
| Canberra Community Hospital Ordinance (No. 2) 1940 (repealed) | No. 10 of 1940 | 13 June 1940 |
An Ordinance to amend the Canberra Community Hospital Ordinance 1938-1939. (Repealed by Health Commission Ordinance 1975 (No. 75))
| Housing Ordinance 1940 (repealed) | No. 11 of 1940 | 21 June 1940 |
An Ordinance to amend the Housing Ordinance 1928-1937. (Note: Housing Ordinance 1928 (No. 11)) (Repealed by Self-Government (Consequential Amendments) Ordinance 1989 (No. 38))
| Stock Ordinance 1940 or the Stock Act 1940 (repealed) | No. 12 of 1940 | 27 June 1940 |
An Ordinance to amend the Stock Ordinance 1934-1936. (Note: Stock Ordinance 1934 (No. 9)) (Repealed by Statute Law Revision (Miscellaneous Provisions) Act 1993 (No. 1))
| Hospital Tax Ordinance 1940 (repealed) | No. 13 of 1940 | 27 June 1940 |
An Ordinance to amend the Hospital Tax Ordinance 1935-1939. (Note: Hospital Tax Ordinance 1935 (No. 13)) (Repealed by Hospital Tax Ordinance Repeal Ordinance 1946 (No. 10))
| Timber Protection Ordinance 1940 (repealed) | No. 14 of 1940 | 11 July 1940 |
An Ordinance to amend the Timber Protection Ordinance 1919-1937. (Note: Timber Protection Ordinance 1919 (No. 2)) (Repealed by Nature Conservation Ordinance 1980 (No. 20))
| Trespass on Commonwealth Lands Ordinance 1940 or the Trespass on Commonwealth Lands Act 1940 (repealed) | No. 15 of 1940 | 11 July 1940 |
An Ordinance to amend the Trespass on Commonwealth Lands Ordinance 1932-1939. (Note: Trespass on Commonwealth Lands Ordinance 1932 (No. 6)) (Repealed by Statute Law Amendment Act 2000 (No. 80))
| Real Property Ordinance 1940 or the Real Property Act 1940 (repealed) | No. 16 of 1940 | 8 August 1940 |
An Ordinance to amend the Real Property Ordinance 1925-1938 (Note: Real Property Ordinance 1925 (No. 1)) and for other purposes. (Repealed by Statute Law Amendment Act 2000 (No. 80))
| Canberra Community Hospital Ordinance (No. 3) 1940 (repealed) | No. 17 of 1940 | 8 August 1940 |
An Ordinance to amend the Canberra Community Hospital Ordinance 1938-1940. (Repealed by Health Commission Ordinance 1975 (No. 75))
| Public Baths Ordinance 1940 (repealed) | No. 18 of 1940 | 12 September 1940 |
An Ordinance to amend the Public Baths Ordinance 1931-1936. (Note: Public Baths Ordinance 1931 (No. 2)) (Repealed by Public Baths and Public Bathing Act 1956 (No. 12))
| Inflammable Liquids Ordinance 1940 (repealed) | No. 19 of 1940 | 3 October 1940 |
An Ordinance to Regulate the Keeping, Conveyance and Sale of Inflammable Liquids and Dangerous Goods. (Repealed by Flammable Liquids Ordinance 1976 (No. 2))
| Court of Petty Sessions Ordinance 1940 or the Court of Petty Sessions Act 1940 (repealed) | No. 20 of 1940 | 7 November 1940 |
An Ordinance to amend the Court of Petty Sessions Ordinance 1930-1938. (Note: Court of Petty Sessions Ordinance (No. 2) 1930 (No. 21)) (Repealed by Statute Law Amendment Act 2000 (No. 80))
| Police Superannuation Ordinance (No. 2) 1940 (repealed) | No. 21 of 1940 | 28 November 1940 |
An Ordinance to amend the Police Superannuation Ordinance 1928-1940. (Repealed by Police Pensions Ordinance 1958 (No. 58))
| Court of Petty Sessions Ordinance (No. 2) 1940 or the Court of Petty Sessions Act (No. 2) 1940 (repealed) | No. 22 of 1940 | 12 December 1940 |
An Ordinance to amend the Court of Petty Sessions Ordinance 1930-1940. (Repealed by Statute Law Amendment Act 2000 (No. 80))
| | No. 23 of 1940 | |
| Liquor (Renewal of Licences) Ordinance 1940 (repealed) | No. 24 of 1940 | 30 December 1940 |
An Ordinance relating to the Renewal of Licences granted under the Liquor Ordinance 1929-1938. (Note: Liquor Ordinance 1929 (No. 15)) (Repealed by Ordinances Revision Ordinance 1959 (No. 21))

== Sources ==
- "legislation.act.gov.au".
