= Gordon Ada =

Australian microbiologist/immunologist

Gordon Ada AO, FAA
- Born: 6 December 1922; Sydney, New South Wales, Australia
- Died: 25 September 2012 (aged 89); Canberra, Australia
- Education: University of Sydney
- Spouse: Jean MacPherson (m. 1946)
- Scientific career
- Fields: Microbiology, virology, immunology
- Institutions: National Institute for Medical Research; Walter and Eliza Hall Institute of Medical Research; John Curtin School of Medical Research; Johns Hopkins University

Gordon Leslie Ada AO, FAA (6 December 1922 – 25 September 2012) was an Australian biochemist best known for his seminal contributions to virology and immunology and his long leadership of the Department of Microbiology at the John Curtin School of Medical Research at the Australian National University, where Peter C. Doherty and Rolf Zinkernagel performed their Nobel winning research in his department. Both Zinkernagel and Doherty held him in high regard, and he was invited by them to attend the Nobel award ceremony and dinner in Stockholm.

Gordon Ada was born in 1922 in Sydney. He studied at Fort Street High School, then at the University of Sydney, graduating BSc in 1943, and MSc in 1946. After completing his Masters he went to London to work for the National Institute for Medical Research, staying in London until 1948. When he returned to Australia, he conducted research at the Walter and Eliza Hall Institute of Medical Research under director Frank Macfarlane Burnet and was involved in the establishment of the Biochemistry and Biophysics Research Unit with Henry Holden. At the Hall Institute he initially worked on the viruses that cause influenza and Murray Valley encephalitis. He was the first to establish that influenza is an RNA virus and was awarded his DSc by the University of Sydney in 1959. From 1962 he focused on immune reactions, demonstrating that antigens are not present in antibody-producing cells, in support of Burnet's clonal selection theory.

In 1968 Ada was appointed head of the Microbiology Department at the John Curtin School of Medical Research at the Australian National University, taking over from Frank Fenner. He held the position for 20 years; during his period of leadership the school became an international centre for the analysis of T cell-mediated immunity. He was also active in the World Health Organization from 1971, his involvement lasting over 20 years. While retaining his Australian base, he spent substantial time in the US from 1988, becoming Associate Director and then Director of Johns Hopkins School of Hygiene and Public Health in Baltimore.

His latter years in science were spent as a visiting professor at the John Curtin School, where he was involved in the development of a candidate HIV vaccine. During that time he wrote a popular science book on immunization, Vaccination: The Facts, the Fears, the Future, published in 2001.

He died on 25 September 2012.

== Honours and recognition ==
Ada was elected a Fellow of the Australian Academy of Science in 1964 and awarded the Lemberg Medal in 1971. He was appointed an Officer of the Order of Australia in the 1993 Australia Day Honours for "service to medicine in the field of immunology and international health".

== Interviews ==
Ada, Gordon; Fenner, Frank (1993). "Professor Gordon Ada in interview with Professor Frank Fenner: Part 1". Learning Resources. Oxford Brookes University. doi:10.24384/000143.

Ada, Gordon; Fenner, Frank (1993). "Professor Gordon Ada in interview with Professor Frank Fenner: Part 2". Learning Resources. Oxford Brookes University. doi:10.24384/000144.
