= List of ordinances of the Australian Capital Territory from 1936 =

This is a list of ordinances enacted by the Governor-General of Australia for the Territory for the Seat of Government (Australian Capital Territory) for the year 1936.

== 1936 ==
Short title, or popular name	Citation	Notified
Long title
Instruments Ordinance 1936 or the Instruments Act 1936 (repealed)	No. 1 of 1936	9 January 1936
An Ordinance to amend the Instruments Ordinances 1933. (Note: Instruments Ordinance 1933 (No. 25)) (Repealed by Statute Law Amendment Act 2000 (No. 80))
Trustee Ordinance 1936 (repealed)	No. 2 of 1936	9 January 1936
An Ordinance to amend the Trustee Act, 1898, (Note: Trustee Act 1898 (No. 4 (NSW))) of the State of New South Wales, in its application to the Territory, as amended by the Trustee Ordinance 1932 (Note: Trustee Ordinance 1932 (No. 10)) and by the Trustee Ordinance 1934. (Note: Trustee Ordinance 1934 (No. 13)) (Repealed by Trustee Ordinance 1957 (No. 14))
Leases (Special Purposes) Ordinance 1936 or the Leases (Special Purposes) Act 1936 (repealed)	No. 3 of 1936	23 January 1936
An Ordinance to amend the Leases (Special Purposes) Ordinance 1925-1932. (Note: Leases (Special Purposes) Ordinance 1925 (No. 11)) (Repealed by Land (Planning and Environment) (Consequential Provisions) Act 1991 (No. 118))
Stock Ordinance 1936 or the Stock Act 1936 (repealed)	No. 4 of 1936	23 January 1936
An Ordinance to amend the Stock Ordinance 1934. (Note: Stock Ordinance 1934 (No. 9)) (Repealed by Statute Law Revision (Miscellaneous Provisions) Act 1993 (No. 1))
Nurses Registration Ordinance 1936 (repealed)	No. 5 of 1936	6 February 1936
An Ordinance to amend the Nurses Registration Ordinances 1933. (Note: Nurses Registration Ordinance 1933 (No. 1)) (Repealed by Nurses Ordinance 1988 (No. 61))
Juvenile Offenders (Detention) Agreement Ordinance 1936 (repealed)	No. 6 of 1936	20 February 1936
An Ordinance to approve an Agreement made between the Minister of Public Instruction of the State of New South Wales and the Attorney-General of the Common-wealth of Australia for the reception, detention and maintenance in institutions in the State of New South Wales of children committed to those institutions by the Courts of the Territory for the Seat of Government.
Noxious Weeds Ordinance 1936 or the Noxious Weeds Act 1936 (repealed)	No. 7 of 1936	27 February 1936
An Ordinance to amend the Noxious Weeds Ordinance 1921-1922. (Note: Noxious Weeds Ordinance 1921 (No. 2)) (Repealed by Land (Planning and Environment) (Amendment) Act 1997 (No. 7))
Canberra Community Hospital Board Ordinance 1936 (repealed)	No. 8 of 1936	12 March 1936
An Ordinance to amend the Canberra Community Hospital Board Ordinances 1935. (Note: Canberra Community Hospital Board Ordinance 1935 (No. 16)) (Repealed by Canberra Community Hospital Ordinance 1938 (No. 20))
Public Baths Ordinance 1936 (repealed)	No. 9 of 1936	2 April 1936
An Ordinance to amend the Public Baths Ordinances 1931. (Note: Public Baths Ordinance 1931 (No. 2)) (Repealed by Public Baths and Public Bathing Ordinance 1956 (No. 12))
Tobacco Ordinance 1936 or the Tobacco Act 1936 (repealed)	No. 10 of 1936	2 April 1936
An Ordinance to amend the Tobacco Ordinance 1927 (Note: Tobacco Ordinance 1927 (No. 14)) as amended by the Seat of Government (Administration) Ordinance 1930-1933. (Note: Seat of Government (Administration) Ordinance 1930 (No. 5)) (Repealed by Statute Law Amendment Act 2000 (No. 80))
Apprenticeship Ordinance 1936 or the Apprenticeship Act 1936 (repealed)	No. 11 of 1936	2 April 1936
An Ordinance relating to Apprenticeship. (Repealed by Vocational Training Act 1989 (No. 2))
Industrial Board Ordinance 1936 (repealed)	No. 12 of 1936	9 April 1936
An Ordinance to provide for an Industrial Board in the Territory for the Seat of Government. (Repealed by Self-Government (Consequential Amendments) Ordinance 1989 (No. 38))
Money Lenders Ordinance 1936 (repealed)	No. 13 of 1936	9 April 1936
An Ordinance relating to the Business of Money Lending and for other purposes. (Repealed by Credit Ordinance 1985 (No. 5))
Companies (Liquidation) Ordinance 1936 (repealed)	No. 14 of 1936	23 April 1936
An Ordinance to amend the Companies (Liquidation) Ordinance 1935. (Note: Companies (Liquidation) Ordinance 1935 (No. 15)) (Repealed by Companies Ordinance 1954 (No. 14))
Real Property Ordinance 1936 or the Real Property Act 1936 (repealed)	No. 15 of 1936	30 April 1936
An Ordinance to amend the Real Property Ordinance 1925-1934. (Note: Real Property Ordinance 1925 (No. 1)) (Repealed by Statute Law Amendment Act 2000 (No. 80))
Housing Ordinance 1936 (repealed)	No. 16 of 1936	30 April 1936
An Ordinance to amend the Housing Ordinance 1928-1930. (Note: Housing Ordinance 1928 (No. 11)) (Repealed by Ordinances Revision Ordinance 1937 (No. 27))
Wild Flowers and Native Plants Protection Ordinance 1936 (repealed)	No. 17 of 1936	7 May 1936
An Ordinance to provide for the Protection of Wild Flowers and Native Plants. (Repealed by Nature Conservation Ordinance 1980 (No. 20))
Bank Holidays Ordinance 1936 (repealed)	No. 18 of 1936	14 May 1936
An Ordinance to amend the Bank Holidays Ordinance 1927-1930. (Note: Bank Holidays Ordinance 1927 (No. 8)) (Repealed by Bank Holidays Ordinance 1952 (No. 3))
Queanbeyan Lease Ordinance 1936 (repealed)	No. 19 of 1936	14 May 1936
An Ordinance to amend the Queanbeyan Lease Ordinance 1929. (Note: Queanbeyan Lease Ordinance 1929 (No. 3)) (Repealed by Self-Government (Consequential Amendments) Ordinance 1989 (No. 38))
Careless Use of Fire Ordinance 1936 or the Careless Use of Fire Act 1936 or the Bushfire Act 1936 (repealed)	No. 20 of 1936	14 May 1936
An Ordinance relating to the Prevention of the Careless Use of Fire. (Repealed by Emergencies Act 2004 (No. 28T))
Canberra University College Ordinance 1936 (repealed)	No. 21 of 1936	21 May 1936
An Ordinance to amend the Canberra University College Ordinance 1929-1932, (Note: Canberra University College Ordinance 1929 (No. 20)) as amended by the Seat of Government (Administration) Ordinance 1930-1933. (Repealed by Canberra University College Ordinance 1953 (No. 8))
Hospital Tax Ordinance 1936 (repealed)	No. 22 of 1936	4 June 1936
An Ordinance to amend the Hospital Tax Ordinance 1935. (Note: Hospital Tax Ordinance 1935 (No. 13)) (Repealed by Hospital Tax Ordinance Repeal Ordinance 1946 (No. 10))
Companies (Investigation of Affairs) Ordinance 1936 (repealed)	No. 23 of 1936	19 June 1936
An Ordinance to amend the Companies (Investigation of Affairs) Ordinance 1934. (Note: Companies (Investigation of Affairs) Ordinance 1934 (No. 18)) (Repealed by Companies Ordinance 1954 (No. 14))
Poisons and Dangerous Drugs Ordinance 1936 or the Poisons and Dangerous Drugs Act 1936 (repealed)	No. 24 of 1936	25 June 1936
An Ordinance to amend the Poisons and Dangerous Drugs Ordinance 1933. (Note: Poisons and Dangerous Drugs Ordinance 1933 (No. 37)) (Repealed by Statute Law Amendment Act 2000 (No. 80))
Companies (Investigation of Affairs) Ordinance (No. 2) 1936 (repealed)	No. 25 of 1936	2 July 1936
An Ordinance to amend the Companies (Investigation of Affairs) Ordinance 1934-1936. (Repealed by Companies Ordinance 1954 (No. 14))
Liquor Ordinance 1936 (repealed)	No. 26 of 1936	9 July 1936
An Ordinance to amend the Liquor Ordinance 1929-1935. (Note: Liquor Ordinance 1929 (No. 15)) (Repealed by Ordinances Revision Ordinance 1937 (No. ))
Fish Protection Ordinance 1936 (repealed)	No. 27 of 1936	9 July 1936
An Ordinance to amend the Fish Protection Ordinance 1929-1935. (Note: Fish Protection Ordinance 1929 (No. 2)) (Repealed by Fishing Ordinance 1967 (No. 7))
Juvenile Offenders (Detention) Ordinance 1936 (repealed)	No. 28 of 1936	16 July 1936
An Ordinance to amend the Juvenile Offenders (Detention) Ordinance 1935. (Note: Juvenile Offenders (Detention) Ordinance 1935 (No. 4)) (Repealed by Juvenile Offenders Ordinance 1941 (No. 11))
Leases Ordinance 1936 or the Leases Act 1936 (repealed)	No. 29 of 1936	23 July 1936
An Ordinance to amend the Leases Ordinance 1918-1933, (Note: Leases Ordinance 1918 (No. 2)) and for other purposes. (Repealed by Land (Planning and Environment) (Consequential Provisions) Act 1991 (No. 118))
Land Valuation Ordinance 1936 or the Land Valuation Act 1936 (repealed)	No. 30 of 1936	23 July 1936
An Ordinance to provide for the Appointment of a Land Commissioner and for the Constitution of a Land Court for the Australian Capital Territory, and for other purposes. (Repealed by Land (Planning and Environment) (Consequential Provisions) Act 1991 (No. 118))
City Area Leases Ordinance 1936 or the City Area Leases Act 1936 (repealed)	No. 31 of 1936	23 July 1936
An Ordinance relating to the Leasing of Commonwealth Lands in the City Area of the Territory. (Repealed by Land (Planning and Environment) (Consequential Provisions) Act 1991 (No. 118))
Industrial Board Ordinance (No. 2) 1936 (repealed)	No. 32 of 1936	23 July 1936
An Ordinance to amend the Industrial Board Ordinance 1936. (Note: Industrial Board Ordinance 1936 (No. 12)) (Repealed by Self-Government (Consequential Amendments) Ordinance 1989 (No. 38))
Advisory Council Ordinance 1936 (Note: Two ordinances, No. 33 of 1936 and No. 49 of 1936, both share the same short title, Advisory Council Ordinance 1936.) (repealed)	No. 33 of 1936	30 July 1936
An Ordinance to amend the Advisory Council Ordinance 1930-1935. (Note: Advisory Council Ordinance 1930 (No. 4)) (Repealed by Advisory Council Ordinance 1936 (No. 49))
Queanbeyan Water Supply Ordinance 1936 (repealed)	No. 34 of 1936	6 August 1936
An Ordinance relating to the Water Supply for the Town of Queanbeyan. (Repealed by Self-Government (Consequential Amendments) Ordinance 1989 (No. 38))
Plant Diseases Ordinance 1936 or the Plant Diseases Act 1936 (repealed)	No. 35 of 1936	27 August 1936
An Ordinance to amend the Plant Diseases Ordinance 1934. (Note: Plant Diseases Ordinance 1934 (No. 21)) (Repealed by Statute Law Amendment Act 2000 (No. 80))
Canberra Community Hospital Board Ordinance (No. 2) 1936 (repealed)	No. 36 of 1936	3 September 1936
An Ordinance to amend the Canberra Community Hospital Board Ordinance 1935-1936. (Repealed by Canberra Community Hospital Ordinance 1938 (No. 20))
Land Valuation Ordinance (No. 2) 1936 or the Land Valuation Act (No. 2) 1936 (repealed)	No. 37 of 1936	17 September 1936
An Ordinance to amend the Land Valuation Ordinance 1936. (Note: Land Valuation Ordinance 1936 (No. 30)) (Repealed by Land (Planning and Environment) (Consequential Provisions) Act 1991 (No. 118))
City Area Leases Ordinance (No. 2) 1936 or the City Area Leases Act (No. 2) 1936 (repealed)	No. 38 of 1936	17 September 1936
An Ordinance to amend the City Area Leases Ordinance 1936. (Note: City Area Leases Ordinance 1936 (No. 31)) (Repealed by Land (Planning and Environment) (Consequential Provisions) Act 1991 (No. 118))
Insane Persons and Inebriates (Committal and Detention) Agreement Ordinance 1936 or the Insane Persons and Inebriates (Committal and Detention) Ordinance 1936 or the Insane Persons and Inebriates (Committal and Detention) Act 1936 (repealed)	No. 39 of 1936	17 September 1936
An Ordinance to approve an Agreement made between the Minister for Health of the State of New South Wales and the Minister of State for the Interior of the Commonwealth of Australia for the reception, detention and maintenance in institutions in the State of New South Wales of insane persons and inebriates committed to those institutions by a Court, Judge, Magistrate or Justice of the Peace of the Territory for the Seat of Government, and for other purposes. (Repealed by Statute Law Amendment Act 2002 (No. 2) (No. 49))
City Area Leases Ordinance (No. 3) 1936 or the City Area Leases Act (No. 3) 1936 (repealed)	No. 40 of 1936	24 September 1936
An Ordinance to amend the City Area Leases Ordinance 1936 as amended by the City Area Leases Ordinance (No. 2) 1936. (Note: City Area Leases Ordinance (No. 2) 1936 (No. 38)) (Repealed by Land (Planning and Environment) (Consequential Provisions) Act 1991 (No. 118))
Timber Protection Ordinance 1936 (repealed)	No. 41 of 1936	1 October 1936
An Ordinance to amend the Timber Protection Ordinance 1919-1927. (Note: Timber Protection Ordinance 1919 (No. 2)) (Repealed by Self-Government (Consequential Amendments) Ordinance 1989 (No. 38))
Industrial Board Ordinance (No. 3) 1936 (repealed)	No. 42 of 1936	8 October 1936
An Ordinance to amend the Industrial Board Ordinances 1936. (Repealed by Self-Government (Consequential Amendments) Ordinance 1989 (No. 38))
Hawkers Ordinance 1936 or the Hawkers Act 1936 (repealed)	No. 43 of 1936	15 October 1936
An Ordinance relating to the Licensing of Hawkers. (Repealed by Hawkers Act 2003 (No. 10))
Alsatian Dogs Ordinance 1936 (repealed)	No. 44 of 1936	29 October 1936
An Ordinance relating to Alsatian Dogs. (Repealed by Alsatian Dogs (Repeal) Ordinance 1977 (No. 41))
Motor Traffic Ordinance 1936 or the Motor Traffic Act 1936 (repealed)	No. 45 of 1936	29 October 1936
An Ordinance relating to Motor Vehicles and Motor Traffic. (Repealed by Road Transport Legislation Amendment Act 1999 (No. 45))
Auctioneers Ordinance 1936 (repealed)	No. 46 of 1936	12 November 1936
An Ordinance to amend the Auctioneers Ordinance 1927, (Note: Auctioneers Ordinance 1927 (No. 2)) as amended by the Seat of Government (Administration) Ordinance 1930, by the Auctioneers Ordinance 1932 (Note: Auctioneers Ordinance 1932 (No. 2)) and by the Seat of Government (Administration) Ordinance 1933. (Note: Seat of Government (Administration) Ordinance 1933 (No. 4)) (Repealed by Auctioneers Ordinance 1959 (No. 2))
Juries Ordinance 1936 (repealed)	No. 47 of 1936	19 November 1936
An Ordinance to amend the Juries Ordinance 1932-1933. (Note: Juries Ordinance 1932 (No. 25)) (Repealed by Juries Ordinance 1967 (No. 47))
Dogs Registration Ordinance 1936 (repealed)	No. 48 of 1936	28 November 1936
An Ordinance to amend the Dogs Registration Ordinance 1926-1934. (Note: Dogs Registration Ordinance 1926 (No. 1)) (Repealed by Dog Control Ordinance 1975 (No. 18))
Advisory Council Ordinance 1936 or the Legislative Assembly Ordinance 1936 or the House of Assembly Ordinance 1936 (repealed)	No. 49 of 1936	23 December 1936
An Ordinance relating to the establishment of an Advisory Council. (Repealed by Advisory Council Ordinance 1986 (No. 62))

== Sources ==
- "legislation.act.gov.au".
