= List of ordinances of the Australian Capital Territory from 1980 =

This is a list of ordinances enacted by the Governor-General of Australia for the Australian Capital Territory for the year 1980.

== 1980 ==
Short title, or popular name	Citation	Notified
Long title
Holidays (Amendment) Ordinance 1980 or the Holidays (Amendment) Act 1980 (repealed)	No. 1 of 1980	1 February 1980
An Ordinance to amend the Holidays Ordinance 1958. (Note: Holidays Ordinance 1958 (No. 19)) (Repealed by Statute Law Amendment Act 2000 (No. 80))
Flammable Liquids (Amendment) Ordinance 1980 (repealed)	No. 2 of 1980	28 February 1980
An Ordinance to amend the Flammable Liquids Ordinance 1976. (Note: Flammable Liquids Ordinance 1976 (No. 2)) (Repealed by Dangerous Goods Ordinance 1984 (No. 4))
First Offenders (Women) (Repeal) Ordinance 1980 or the First Offenders (Women) (Repeal) Act 1980 (repealed)	No. 3 of 1980	28 February 1980
An Ordinance to repeal the First Offenders (Women) Ordinance 1947. (Note: First Offenders (Women) Ordinance 1947 (No. 4)) (Repealed by Statute Law Revision (Miscellaneous Provisions) Act 1992 (No. 23))
Court of Petty Sessions (Amendment) Ordinance 1980 or the Court of Petty Sessions (Amendment) Act 1980 (repealed)	No. 4 of 1980	20 March 1980
An Ordinance to amend the Court of Petty Sessions Ordinance 1930. (Note: Court of Petty Sessions Ordinance (No. 2) 1930 (No. 21)) (Repealed by Statute Law Amendment Act 2000 (No. 80))
Coroners (Amendment) Ordinance 1980 or the Coroners (Amendment) Act 1980 (repealed)	No. 5 of 1980	20 March 1980
An Ordinance to amend the Coroners Ordinance 1956. (Note: Coroners Ordinance 1956 (No. 14)) (Repealed by Coroners (Consequential Provisions) Act 1997 (No. 58))
Companies (Amendment) Ordinance 1980 (repealed)	No. 6 of 1980	20 March 1980
An Ordinance to amend the Companies Ordinance 1962. (Note: Companies Ordinance 1962 (No. 7)) (Repealed by Companies Act 1981 (No. 89 (Cth)))
Betting (Totalizator Agency) (Amendment) Ordinance 1980 or the Betting (Totalizator Agency) (Amendment) Act 1980 (repealed)	No. 7 of 1980	20 March 1980
An Ordinance to amend the Betting (Totalizator Agency) Ordinance 1964. (Note: Betting (Totalizator Agency) Ordinance 1964 (No. 14)) (Repealed by Statute Law Amendment Act 2000 (No. 80))
Administration and Probate (Amendment) Ordinance 1980 or the Administration and Probate (Amendment) Act 1980 (repealed)	No. 8 of 1980	26 March 1980
An Ordinance to amend the Administration and Probate Ordinance 1929. (Note: Administration and Probate Ordinance 1929 (No. 18)) (Repealed by Statute Law Amendment Act 2000 (No. 80))
Sheriff (Amendment) Ordinance 1980 (Note: This is a reserved law and cannot be amended or repealed by the Legislative Assembly of the Australian Capital Territory.)	No. 9 of 1980	26 March 1980
An Ordinance to amend the Sheriff Ordinance 1934. (Note: Sheriff Ordinance 1934 (No. 8))
Court of Petty Sessions (Amendment) Ordinance (No. 2) 1980 or the Court of Petty Sessions (Amendment) Act (No. 2) 1980 (repealed)	No. 10 of 1980	26 March 1980
An Ordinance to amend the Court of Petty Sessions Ordinance 1930. (Repealed by Statute Law Amendment Act 2000 (No. 80))
Protection of Lands (Amendment) Ordinance 1980 or the Protection of Lands (Amendment) Act 1980 (repealed)	No. 11 of 1980	2 May 1980
An Ordinance to amend the Protection of Lands Ordinance 1937. (Note: Protection of Lands Ordinance 1937 (No. 33)) (Repealed by Statute Law Amendment Act 2000 (No. 80))
Remuneration (Amendment) Ordinance 1980 (repealed)	No. 12 of 1980	9 May 1980
An Ordinance to amend the Remuneration Ordinance 1976. (Note: Remuneration Ordinance 1976 (No. 62)) (Repealed by Remuneration (Repeal) Ordinance 1989 (No. 49))
Real Property (Amendment) Ordinance 1980 or the Real Property (Amendment) Act 1980 (repealed)	No. 13 of 1980	15 May 1980
An Ordinance to amend the Real Property Ordinance 1925. (Note: Real Property Ordinance 1925 (No. 1)) (Repealed by Statute Law Amendment Act 2000 (No. 80))
Registration of Deeds (Amendment) Ordinance 1980 or the Registration of Deeds (Amendment) Act 1980 (repealed)	No. 14 of 1980	15 May 1980
An Ordinance to amend the Registration of Deeds Ordinance 1957. (Note: Registration of Deeds Ordinance 1957 (No. 13)) (Repealed by Statute Law Amendment Act 2000 (No. 80))
Legal Aid (Amendment) Ordinance 1980 or the Legal Aid (Amendment) Act 1980 (repealed)	No. 15 of 1980	30 June 1980
An Ordinance to amend the Legal Aid Ordinance 1977. (Note: Legal Aid Ordinance 1977 (No. 31)) (Repealed by Statute Law Amendment Act 2000 (No. 80))
Legal Practitioners (Amendment) Ordinance 1980 or the Legal Practitioners (Amendment) Act 1980 (repealed)	No. 16 of 1980	30 June 1980
An Ordinance to amend the Legal Practitioners Ordinance 1970. (Note: Legal Practitioners Ordinance 1970 (No. 43)) (Repealed by Statute Law Amendment Act 2000 (No. 80))
Police Offences (Amendment) Ordinance 1980 or the Police Offences (Amendment) Act 1980 (repealed)	No. 17 of 1980	8 July 1980
An Ordinance to amend the Police Offences Ordinance 1930. (Note: Police Offences Ordinance 1930 (No. 9)) (Repealed by Law Reform (Abolitions and Repeals) Act 1996 (No. 17))
Sewerage Rates (Amendment) Ordinance 1980 or the Sewerage Rates (Amendment) Act 1980 (repealed)	No. 18 of 1980	8 July 1980
An Ordinance to amend the Sewerage Rates Ordinance 1968. (Note: Sewerage Rates Ordinance 1968 (No. 30)) (Repealed by Statute Law Amendment Act 2000 (No. 80))
Water Rates (Amendment) Ordinance 1980 or the Water Rates (Amendment) Act 1980 (repealed)	No. 19 of 1980	8 July 1980
An Ordinance to amend the Water Rates Ordinance 1959. (Note: Water Rates Ordinance 1959 (No. 19)) (Repealed by Statute Law Amendment Act 2000 (No. 80))
Nature Conservation Ordinance 1980 or the Nature Conservation Act 1980 (repealed)	No. 20 of 1980	15 July 1980
An Ordinance to make provision for the protection and conservation of wildlife, and for the reservation of areas for those purposes. (Repealed by Nature Conservation Act 2014 (No. 59))
Canberra Retail Markets (Amendment) Ordinance 1980 (repealed)	No. 21 of 1980	15 July 1980
An Ordinance to amend the Canberra Retail Markets Ordinance 1971. (Note: Canberra Retail Markets Ordinance 1971 (No. 29)) (Repealed by Commonwealth Functions (Statutes Review) Act 1981 (No. 74 (Cth)))
Prevention of Cruelty to Animals (Amendment) Ordinance 1980 or the Prevention of Cruelty to Animals (Amendment) Act 1980 (repealed)	No. 22 of 1980	15 July 1980
An Ordinance to amend the Prevention of Cruelty to Animals Ordinance 1959. (Note: Prevention of Cruelty to Animals Ordinance 1959 (No. 16)) (Repealed by Animal Welfare Act 1992 (No. 45))
Rabbit Destruction (Amendment) Ordinance 1980 or the Rabbit Destruction (Amendment) Act 1980 (repealed)	No. 23 of 1980	15 July 1980
An Ordinance to amend the Rabbit Destruction Ordinance 1919. (Note: Rabbit Destruction Ordinance 1919 (No. 6)) (Repealed by Land (Planning and Environment) (Amendment) Act 1997 (No. 7))
Registration of Births, Deaths and Marriages (Amendment) Ordinance 1980 or the Registration of Births, Deaths and Marriages (Amendment) Act 1980 (repealed)	No. 24 of 1980	24 July 1980
An Ordinance to amend the Registration of Births, Deaths and Marriages Ordinance 1963. (Note: Registration of Births, Deaths and Marriages Ordinance 1963 (No. 17)) (Repealed by Births, Deaths and Marriages Registration Act 1997 (No. 112))
House of Assembly (Amendment) Ordinance 1980 (repealed)	No. 25 of 1980	24 July 1980
An Ordinance to amend the House of Assembly Ordinance 1936. (Note: Advisory Council Ordinance 1936 (No. 49)) (Repealed by Advisory Council Ordinance 1986 (No. 62))
Canberra Showground Trust (Amendment) Ordinance 1980 or the Canberra Showground Trust (Amendment) Act 1980 (repealed)	No. 26 of 1980	29 July 1980
An Ordinance to amend the Canberra Showground Trust Ordinance 1976. (Note: Canberra Showground Trust Ordinance 1976 (No. 1)) (Repealed by Statute Law Amendment Act 2000 (No. 80))
Water Rates (Amendment) Ordinance (No. 2) 1980 or the Water Rates (Amendment) Act (No. 2) 1980 (repealed)	No. 27 of 1980	29 July 1980
An Ordinance to amend the Water Rates Ordinance 1959. (Repealed by Statute Law Amendment Act 2000 (No. 80))
Workmen's Compensation Supplementation Fund Ordinance 1980 or the Workmen's Compensation Supplementation Fund Act 1980 or the Workers Compensation Supplementation Fund Act 1980 (repealed)	No. 28 of 1980	11 September 1980
An Ordinance to establish the Workmen's Compensation Supplementation Fund for the payment of certain workmen's compensation claims and for related purposes. (Repealed by Workers Compensation Amendment Act 2006 (No. 4))
Workmen's Compensation (Amendment) Ordinance 1980 or the Workmen's Compensation (Amendment) Act 1980 (repealed)	No. 29 of 1980	11 September 1980
An Ordinance to amend the Workmen's Compensation Ordinance 1951. (Note: Workmen's Compensation Ordinance 1951 (No. 2)) (Repealed by Statute Law Amendment Act 2000 (No. 80))
Sewerage Rates (Amendment) Ordinance (No. 2) 1980 or the Sewerage Rates (Amendment) Act (No. 2) 1980 (repealed)	No. 30 of 1980	12 September 1980
An Ordinance to amend the Sewerage Rates Ordinance 1968. (Repealed by Statute Law Amendment Act 2000 (No. 80))
Interpretation (Amendment) Ordinance 1980 or the Interpretation (Amendment) Act 1980 (repealed)	No. 31 of 1980	25 September 1980
An Ordinance to amend the Interpretation Ordinance 1967. (Note: Interpretation Ordinance 1967 (No. 48)) (Repealed by Statute Law Amendment Act 2000 (No. 80))
Amendments Incorporation (Amendment) Ordinance 1980 or the Amendments Incorporation (Amendment) Act 1980 (repealed)	No. 32 of 1980	25 September 1980
An Ordinanceto amend the Amendments Incorporation Ordinance 1929. (Note: Amendments Incorporation Ordinance 1929 (No. 6)) (Repealed by Law Reform (Repeal of Laws) Act 1997 (No. 42))
Motor Traffic (Amendment) Ordinance 1980 or the Motor Traffic (Amendment) Act 1980 (repealed)	No. 33 of 1980	30 September 1980
An Ordinance to amend the Motor Traffic Ordinance 1936. (Note: Motor Traffic Ordinance 1936 (No. 45)) (Repealed by Road Transport Legislation Amendment Act 1999 (No. 79))
Australian National University (Leases) (Amendment) Ordinance 1980 or the Australian National University (Leases) (Amendment) Act 1980 (repealed)	No. 34 of 1980	9 October 1980
An Ordinance to amend the Australian National University (Leases) Ordinance 1967. (Note: Australian National University (Leases) Ordinance 1967 (No. 21)) (Repealed by Land (Planning and Environment) (Consequential Provisions) Act 1991 (No. 118))
Sewerage Rates (Amendment) Ordinance (No. 3) 1980 or the Sewerage Rates (Amendment) Act (No. 3) 1980 (repealed)	No. 35 of 1980	9 October 1980
An Ordinance to amend the Sewerage Rates Ordinance 1968. (Repealed by Statute Law Amendment Act 2000 (No. 80))
Water Rates (Amendment) Ordinance (No. 3) 1980 or the Water Rates (Amendment) Act (No. 3) 1980 (repealed)	No. 36 of 1980	9 October 1980
An Ordinance to amend the Water Rates Ordinance 1959. (Repealed by Statute Law Amendment Act 2000 (No. 80))
Motor Traffic (Alcohol and Drugs) (Amendment) Ordinance 1980 or the Motor Traffic (Alcohol and Drugs) (Amendment) Act 1980 (repealed)	No. 37 of 1980	14 October 1980
An Ordinance to amend the Motor Traffic (Alcohol and Drugs) Ordinance 1977. (Note: Motor Traffic (Alcohol and Drugs) Ordinance 1977 (No. 17)) (Repealed by Road Transport Legislation Amendment Act 1999 (No. 79))
Fire Brigade (Administration) (Amendment) Ordinance 1980 or the Fire Brigade (Administration) (Amendment) Act 1980 (repealed)	No. 38 of 1980	17 October 1980
An Ordinance to amend the Fire Brigade (Administration) Ordinance 1974. (Note: Fire Brigade (Administration) Ordinance 1974 (No. 52)) (Repealed by Statute Law Amendment Act 2000 (No. 80))
Sale of Motor Vehicles (Amendment) Ordinance 1980 or the Sale of Motor Vehicles (Amendment) Act 1980 (repealed)	No. 39 of 1980	17 October 1980
An Ordinance to amend the Sale of Motor Vehicles Ordinance 1977. (Note: Sale of Motor Vehicles Ordinance 1977 (No. 29)) (Repealed by Statute Law Amendment Act 2000 (No. 80))
Registration of Births, Deaths and Marriages (Amendment) Ordinance (No. 2) 1980 or the Registration of Births, Deaths and Marriages (Amendment) Act (No. 2) 1980 (repealed)	No. 40 of 1980	17 October 1980
An Ordinance to amend the Registration of Births, Deaths and Marriages Ordinance 1963. (Repealed by Births, Deaths and Marriages Registration Act 1997 (No. 112))
Church of England in Australia Ordinance 1980 or the Church of England in Australia Act 1980 (repealed)	No. 41 of 1980	27 November 1980
An Ordinance relating to the Church of England in Australia. (Repealed by Statute Law Amendment Act 2001 (No. 11))
Anglican Church of Australia Ordinance 1980 or the Anglican Church of Australia Act 1980 (repealed)	No. 42 of 1980	27 November 1980
An Ordinance relating to the Anglican Church of Australia. (Repealed by Statute Law Amendment Act 2001 (No. 11))
Corporate Affairs Commission Ordinance 1980 (repealed)	No. 43 of 1980	18 December 1980
An Ordinance to establish a Corporate Affairs Commission for the Australian Capital Territory, and for related purposes. (Repealed by Companies Ordinances Repeal Ordinance 2006 (No. 1))
Seat of Government (Administration) (Amendment) Ordinance 1980 (repealed)	No. 44 of 1980	18 December 1980
An Ordinance to amend the Seat of Government (Administration) Ordinance 1930. (Note: Seat of Government (Administration) Ordinance 1930 (No. 5)) (Repealed by Seat of Government (Administration) (Repeal) Ordinance 1989 (No. 43))
Health Professions Boards (Elections) Ordinance 1980 or the Health Professions Boards (Elections) Act 1980 (repealed)	No. 45 of 1980	23 December 1980
An Ordinance relating to the election of members of certain professional registration boards. (Repealed by Health Professionals Act 2004 (No. 38))
Dentists Registration (Amendment) Ordinance 1980 or the Dentists Registration (Amendment) Act 1980 (repealed)	No. 46 of 1980	23 December 1980
An Ordinance to amend the Dentists Registration Ordinance 1931. (Note: Dentists Registration Ordinance 1931 (No. 8)) (Repealed by Statute Law Amendment Act 2000 (No. 80))
Medical Practitioners Registration (Amendment) Ordinance 1980 or the Medical Practitioners Registration (Amendment) Act 1980 (repealed)	No. 47 of 1980	23 December 1980
An Ordinance to amend the Medical Practitioners Registration Ordinance 1930. (Note: Medical Practitioners Registration Ordinance 1930 (No. 13)) (Repealed by Statute Law Amendment Act 2000 (No. 80))
Nurses Registration (Amendment) Ordinance 1980 (repealed)	No. 48 of 1980	23 December 1980
An Ordinance to amend the Nurses Registration Ordinance 1933. (Note: Nurses Registration Ordinance 1933 (No. 1)) (Repealed by Nurses Ordinance 1988 (No. 61))
Optometrists (Amendment) Ordinance 1980 or the Optometrists (Amendment) Act 1980 (repealed)	No. 49 of 1980	23 December 1980
An Ordinance to amend the Optometrists Ordinance 1956. (Note: Optometrists Ordinance 1956 (No. 4)) (Repealed by Statute Law Amendment Act 2000 (No. 80))
Pharmacy (Amendment) Ordinance 1980 or the Pharmacy (Amendment) Act 1980 (repealed)	No. 50 of 1980	23 December 1980
An Ordinance to amend the Pharmacy Ordinance 1931. (Note: Pharmacy Ordinance 1931 (No. 10)) (Repealed by Statute Law Amendment Act 2000 (No. 80))
Physiotherapists Registration (Amendment) Ordinance 1980 or the Physiotherapists Registration (Amendment) Act 1980 (repealed)	No. 51 of 1980	23 December 1980
An Ordinance to amend the Physiotherapists Registration Ordinance 1977. (Note: Physiotherapists Registration Ordinance 1977 (No. 60)) (Repealed by Statute Law Amendment Act 2000 (No. 80))
Veterinary Surgeons Registration (Amendment) Ordinance 1980 or the Veterinary Surgeons Registration (Amendment) Act 1980 (repealed)	No. 52 of 1980	23 December 1980
An Ordinance to amend the Veterinary Surgeons Registration Ordinance 1965. (Note: Veterinary Surgeons Registration Ordinance 1965 (No. 3)) (Repealed by Statute Law Amendment Act 2000 (No. 80))
Companies (Amendment) Ordinance (No. 2) 1980 (repealed)	No. 53 of 1980	23 December 1980
An Ordinance to amend the Companies Ordinance 1962. (Repealed by Companies Act 1981 (No. 89 (Cth)))
Remuneration (Amendment) Ordinance (No. 2) 1980 (repealed)	No. 54 of 1980	23 December 1980
An Ordinance to amend the Remuneration Ordinance 1976. (Repealed by Remuneration (Repeal) Ordinance 1989 (No. 49))

== Sources ==
- "legislation.act.gov.au".
