= Anna Johnson =

Anna Johnson may refer to:

- Anna Johnson Pell Wheeler (1883–1966), American mathematician
- Anna Johnson Gates (1889–1939), suffragist and politician
- Anna Johnson Julian (1903–1994), civic activist
- Ana Johnsson, Swedish singer

== See also ==
- Anna Johnston (disambiguation)
- Ann Johnson (disambiguation)
