= Annie Johnston =

Annie Johnston may refer to:

== People ==
- Annie Johnston (folklorist), Gaelic folklorist
- Annie Fellows Johnston (1863–1931), American author
- Velma Bronn Johnston (1912–1977), American animal rights activist known as Wild Horse Annie

== Ships ==
- MS Annie Johnston, a Swedish container ship in service 1969-86

== See also ==
- Anne Johnston (disambiguation)
- Annie Johnson (disambiguation)
