= Annie Johnson =

Annie Johnson might refer to:

== Fictional characters ==
- Annie Johnson, character in Annie-for-Spite
- Annie Johnson, character in Imitation of Life (1959 film)

== Other uses ==
- MS Costa Allegra, formerly known as Annie Johnson, a cruise ship
- Annie Johnson (brewer), brewer

== See also ==
- Anne Johnson (disambiguation)
- Annie Johnston (disambiguation)
