= Anna Johnston =

Anna Johnston may refer to:

- Ethna Carbery (1864–1902), born Anna Johnston, Irish journalist, writer and poet
- Anna Johnston (doctor), Australian hematologist

== See also ==
- Anne Johnston (disambiguation)
- Anna Johnson (disambiguation)
