= List of ordinances of the Australian Capital Territory from 1938 =

This is a list of ordinances enacted by the Governor-General of Australia for the Territory for the Seat of Government (Australian Capital Territory) for the year 1938.

== 1938 ==
Short title, or popular name	Citation	Notified
Long title
Plant Diseases Ordinance 1938 or the Plant Diseases Act 1938 (repealed)	No. 1 of 1938	3 February 1938
An Ordinance to amend the Plant Diseases Ordinance 1934-1936. (Note: Plant Diseases Ordinance 1934 (No. 21)) (Repealed by Statute Law Amendment Act 2000 (No. 80))
Adoption of Children Ordinance 1938 (repealed)	No. 2 of 1938	10 February 1938
An Ordinance relating to the Adoption of Children. (Repealed by Adoption of Children Ordinance 1965 (No. 15))
Money Lenders Ordinance 1938 (repealed)	No. 3 of 1938	17 February 1938
An Ordinance to amend the Money Lenders Ordinance 1936. (Note: Money Lenders Ordinance 1936 (No. 13)) (Repealed by Credit Ordinance 1985 (No. 5))
Compensation (Fatal Injuries) Ordinance 1938 (repealed)	No. 4 of 1938	17 February 1938
An Ordinance relating to Compensation to Relatives of Persons whose Deaths are caused by Wrongful Act, Neglect or Default. (Repealed by Compensation (Fatal Injuries) Ordinance 1968 (No. 9))
Matrimonial Causes Ordinance 1938 (repealed)	No. 5 of 1938	24 February 1938
An Ordinance to amend the Matrimonial Causes Act, 1899, (Note: Matrimonial Causes Act 1899 (No. 14 (NSW))) of the State of New South Wales, as amended by the Matrimonial Causes (Amendment) Act, 1929, (Note: Matrimonial Causes (Amendment) Act 1929 (No. 5 (NSW))) of that State, in its application to the Territory, as amended for the time being by Ordinance. (Repealed by Ordinances Revision Ordinance 1977 (No. 65))
Liquor Ordinance 1938 (repealed)	No. 6 of 1938	24 February 1938
An Ordinance to amend the Liquor Ordinance 1929-1936. (Note: Liquor Ordinance 1929 (No. 15)) (Repealed by Liquor Ordinance 1975 (No. 19))
Lunacy Ordinance 1938 (repealed)	No. 7 of 1938	3 March 1938
An Ordinance to amend the Lunacy Act of 1898, (Note: Lunacy Act 1898 (No. 45 (NSW))) of the State of New South Wales in its application to the Territory. (Repealed by Self-Government (Consequential Amendments) Ordinance 1989 (No. 38))
Industrial Board Ordinance 1938 (repealed)	No. 8 of 1938	3 March 1938
An Ordinance to amend the Industrial Board Ordinance 1936-1937. (Note: Industrial Board Ordinance 1936 (No. 12)) (Repealed by Self-Government (Consequential Amendments) Ordinance 1989 (No. 38))
Workmen's Compensation Ordinance 1938 (repealed)	No. 9 of 1938	17 March 1938
An Ordinance to amend the Workmen's Compensation Ordinance 1931-1933. (Note: Workmen's Compensation Ordinance 1931 (No. 22)) (Repealed by Workmen's Compensation Ordinance 1946 (No. 2))
Enquiry Ordinance 1938 or the Enquiry Act 1938 (repealed)	No. 10 of 1938	11 March 1938
An Ordinance to Provide for Enquiry into matters in relation to the Territory for the Seat of Government. (Repealed by Royal Commissions and Inquiries (Consequential Provisions) Act 1991 (No. 3))
Roman Catholic Church Property Trust Ordinance 1938 or the Roman Catholic Church Property Trust Act 1938 (repealed)	No. 11 of 1938	17 March 1938
An Ordinance to amend the Roman Catholic Church Property Trust Ordinance 1937. (Note: Roman Catholic Church Property Trust Ordinance 1937 (No. 2)) (Repealed by Statute Law Amendment Act 2000 (No. 80))
Auctioneers Ordinance 1938 (repealed)	No. 12 of 1938	24 March 1938
An Ordinance to amend the Auctioneers Ordinance 1927-1936. (Note: Auctioneers Ordinance 1927 (No. 2)) (Repealed by Auctioneers Ordinance 1959 (No. 2))
Companies Ordinance 1938 (repealed)	No. 13 of 1938	31 March 1938
An Ordinance to amend the Companies Ordinance 1931-1937. (Note: Companies Ordinance 1931 (No. 25)) (Repealed by Companies Ordinance 1954 (No. 14))
Police Superannuation Ordinance 1938 (repealed)	No. 14 of 1938	31 March 1938
An Ordinance to amend the Police Superannuation Ordinance 1928-1934. (Note: Police Superannuation Ordinance 1928 (No. 16)) (Repealed by Police Pensions Ordinance 1958 (No. 1))
Real Property Ordinance 1938 or the Real Property Act 1938 (repealed)	No. 15 of 1938	31 March 1938
An Ordinance to amend the Real Property Ordinance 1925-1937. (Note: Real Property Ordinance 1925 (No. 1)) (Repealed by Statute Law Amendment Act 2000 (No. 80))
Inebriates Ordinance 1938 or the Inebriates Act 1938 (repealed)	No. 16 of 1938	7 April 1938
An Ordinance relating to Inebriates. (Repealed by Statute Law Amendment Act 2000 (No. 80))
Enquiry Ordinance (No. 2) 1938 or the Enquiry Act (No. 2) 1938 (repealed)	No. 17 of 1938	13 April 1938
An Ordinance to amend the Enquiry Ordinance 1938. (Note: Enquiry Ordinance 1938 (No. 10)) (Repealed by Statute Law Revision (Miscellaneous Provisions) Act 1993 (No. 1))
Rural Workers Accommodation Ordinance 1938 or the Rural Workers Accommodation Act 1938 (repealed)	No. 18 of 1938	13 April 1938
An Ordinance relating to the Provision of Accommodation for Rural Workers. (Repealed by Law Reform (Abolitions and Repeals) Act 1996 (No. 1))
Apprenticeship Ordinance 1938 or the Apprenticeship Act 1938 (repealed)	No. 19 of 1938	28 April 1938
An Ordinance to amend the Apprenticeship Ordinance 1936-1937. (Note: Apprenticeship Ordinance 1936 (No. 11)) (Repealed by Vocational Training Act 1989 (No. 2))
Canberra Community Hospital Ordinance 1938 or the Canberra Hospitals Ordinance 1938 (repealed)	No. 20 of 1938	2 June 1938
An Ordinance to make provision for the Control and Management of the Canberra Community Hospital, and for other purposes. (Repealed by Health Commission Ordinance 1975 (No. 16))
City Area Leases Ordinance 1938 or the City Area Leases Act 1938 (repealed)	No. 21 of 1938	9 June 1938
An Ordinance to amend the City Area Leases Ordinances 1936. (Note: City Area Leases Ordinance 1936 (No. 31)) (Repealed by Land (Planning and Environment) (Consequential Provisions) Act 1991 (No. 118))
Hospital Tax Ordinance 1938 (repealed)	No. 22 of 1938	9 June 1938
An Ordinance to amend the Hospital Tax Ordinance 1935-1936. (Note: Hospital Tax Ordinance 1935 (No. 13)) (Repealed by Hospital Tax Ordinance Repeal Ordinance 1946 (No. 10))
Education Ordinance 1938 or the Education Act 1938 (repealed)	No. 23 of 1938	16 June 1938
An Ordinance to amend the Education Ordinance 1937. (Note: Education Ordinance 1937 (No. 25)) (Repealed by Statute Law Amendment Act 2000 (No. 80))
Walter Oswald Watt Memorial Fund Ordinance 1938 or the Walter Oswald Watt Memorial Fund Act 1938 (repealed)	No. 24 of 1938	8 September 1938
An Ordinance to authorize the Variation of certain trusts under the Will of the late Walter Oswald Watt. (Repealed by Law Reform (Abolitions and Repeals) Act 1996 (No. 1))
Seat of Government (Designation) Ordinance 1938 or the Seat of Government (Designation) Act 1938 (repealed)	No. 25 of 1938	8 September 1938
An Ordinance relating to the Designation of the Territory for the Seat of Government. (Repealed by Law Reform (Abolitions and Repeals) Act 1996 (No. 1))
Canberra Community Hospital Ordinance (No. 2) 1938 (repealed)	No. 26 of 1938	13 October 1938
An Ordinance to amend the Canberra Community Hospital Ordinance 1938. (Note: Canberra Community Hospital Ordinance 1938 (No. 20)) (Repealed by Health Commission Ordinance 1975 (No. 16))
Liquor Ordinance (No. 2) 1938 (repealed)	No. 27 of 1938	13 October 1938
An Ordinance to amend the Liquor Ordinance 1929-1938. (Repealed by Liquor Ordinance 1975 (No. 19))
Companies (Liquidation) Ordinance 1938 (repealed)	No. 28 of 1938	3 November 1938
An Ordinance to amend the Companies (Liquidation) Ordinance 1935-1936. (Note: Companies (Liquidation) Ordinance 1935 (No. 15)) (Repealed by Companies Ordinance 1954 (No. 14))
Money Lenders Ordinance (No. 2) 1938 (repealed)	No. 29 of 1938	3 November 1938
An Ordinance to amend the Money Lenders Ordinance 1936-1938. (Repealed by Credit Ordinance 1985 (No. 5))
Advisory Council Ordinance 1938 (repealed)	No. 30 of 1938	10 November 1938
An Ordinance to amend the Advisory Council Ordinance 1936-1937. (Note: Advisory Council Ordinance 1936 (No. 33)) (Repealed by Advisory Council Ordinance 1986 (No. 62))
Police Superannuation Ordinance (No. 2) 1938 (repealed)	No. 31 of 1938	10 November 1938
An Ordinance to amend the Police Superannuation Ordinance 1928-1938. (Repealed by Police Pensions Ordinance 1958 (No. 1))
Seat of Government (Administration) Ordinance 1938 (repealed)	No. 32 of 1938	28 November 1938
An Ordinance to amend the Seat of Government (Administration) Ordinance 1930-1937, (Note: Seat of Government (Administration) Ordinance 1930 (No. 5)) as amended by the Seat of Government (Designation) Ordinance 1938. (Note: Seat of Government (Designation) Ordinance 1938 (No. 25)) (Repealed by Seat of Government (Administration) (Repeal) Ordinance 1989 (No. 43))
Industrial Board Ordinance (No. 2) 1938 (repealed)	No. 33 of 1938	1 December 1938
An Ordinance to amend the Industrial Board Ordinance 1936-1938. (Repealed by Self-Government (Consequential Amendments) Ordinance1989 (No. 38))
Maintenance Orders (Facilities for Enforcement) Ordinance 1938 (repealed)	No. 34 of 1938	8 December 1938
An Ordinance to amend the Maintenance Orders (Facilities for Enforcement) Ordinance 1927-1937, (Note: Maintenance Orders (Facilities for Enforcement) Ordinance 1927 (No. 9)) as amended by the Seat of Government (Designation) Ordinance 1938. (Repealed by Maintenance Ordinance 1968 (No. 20))
Ordinances Revision Ordinance 1938 or the Ordinances Revision Act 1938 or the Acts Revision Act 1938 (repealed)	No. 35 of 1938	15 December 1938
An Ordinance for the Revision and Amendment of certain Ordinances of the Australian Capital Territory. (Repealed by Law Reform (Abolitions and Repeals) Act 1996 (No. 1))
Seat of Government (Administration) Ordinance (No. 2) 1938 (repealed)	No. 36 of 1938	15 December 1938
An Ordinance to amend the Seat of Government (Administration) Ordinance 1930-1938. (Repealed by Seat of Government (Administration) (Repeal) Ordinance 1989 (No. 43))
National Capital Development Ordinance 1938 (repealed)	No. 37 of 1938	22 December 1938
An Ordinance to establish a Committee to consider and advise upon Matters involved in the Planning and Development of the National Capital and its Environs. (Repealed by National Capital Development Ordinances Repeal Ordinance 1957 (No. 16))
Industrial Board Ordinance (No. 3) 1938 (repealed)	No. 38 of 1938	22 December 1938
An Ordinance to amend the Industrial Board Ordinance 1936-1938. (Repealed by Self-Government (Consequential Amendments) Ordinance 1989 (No. 38))
Plant Diseases Ordinance (No. 2) 1938 or the Plant Diseases Act (No. 2) 1938 (repealed)	No. 39 of 1938	5 January 1939
An Ordinance to amend the Plant Diseases Ordinance 1934-1938. (Repealed by Statute Law Amendment Act 2000 (No. 80))
Rabbit Destruction Ordinance 1938 or the Rabbit Destruction Act 1938 (repealed)	No. 40 of 1938	22 December 1938
An Ordinance relating to Rabbit Destruction. (Repealed by Land (Planning and Environment) (Amendment) Act 1997 (No. 7))
Motor Traffic Ordinance 1938 or the Motor Traffic Act 1938 (repealed)	No. 41 of 1938	30 December 1938
An Ordinance to amend the Motor Traffic Ordinance 1936, (Note: Motor Traffic Ordinance 1936 (No. 45)) as amended by the Seat of Government (Designation) Ordinance 1938. (Repealed by Road Transport Legislation Amendment Act 1999 (No. 79))

== Sources ==
- "legislation.act.gov.au".
