= Royal Canberra Hospital implosion =

Failed controlled demolition

Coordinates: 35.29°S 149.12°E

The Royal Canberra Hospital implosion was a failed building implosion that killed one person and injured nine others. The implosion occurred on 13 July 1997, when the city's superseded hospital buildings at Acton Peninsula on Lake Burley Griffin (that formerly constituted the Royal Canberra Hospital) were demolished to make way for the National Museum of Australia.

== Background ==
The Royal Canberra Hospital closed on 27 November 1991 amid much controversy. Consultant physician Marcus de Laune Faunce wrote: "Towards the end of 1990 many Canberra citizens were either bewildered, angered or saddened as they realised that the Royal Canberra Hospital on Acton Peninsula was soon to be closed. Its staffing structure and organisation were thought to have been planned in step with population needs and the hospital was placed in the memories and affections of multiple people. Its central position on the lake had been marked by Walter Burley Griffin on his original plan. After its formative years, it served Canberra for more than three decades as a first-class hospital staffed by hard-working, skilled and caring health workers. With its magnificent site and proximity to the Australian National University it had enormous potential as a future teaching hospital reflecting the best of Australian medical services."

== Implosion ==
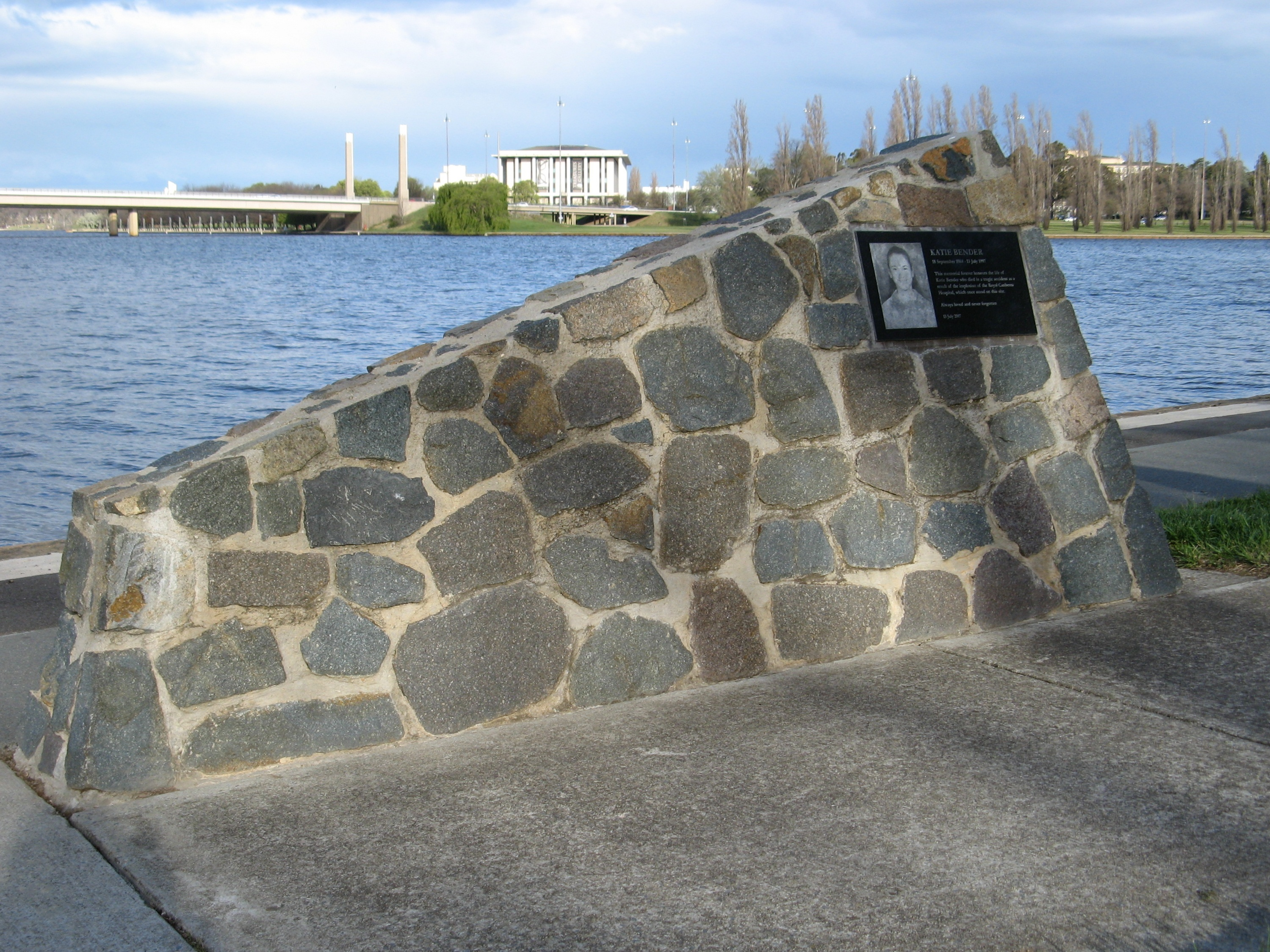
Memorial to Katie Bender, killed by the debris from the implosion

In April 1995, the Keating Government agreed in principle with the Australian Capital Territory (ACT) Government to exchange certain sites of land within the ACT to facilitate the building of the National Museum. In July 1995, a feasibility study was undertaken for the demolition and clearance of the buildings on Acton Peninsula. On 4 August 1995, the ACT Cabinet approved a submission recommending the implosion method of demolition. On Friday 13 December 1996, the Prime Minister, John Howard, announced the design work on Acton Peninsula for the National Museum would begin immediately. The next day, a fence was erected around the site.

The demolition of the Canberra Hospital by way of implosion was billed as a spectator event by the ACT Government. For this event, over 100,000 people, one of the largest crowds in Canberra's history, were in attendance.

The implosion of the Royal Canberra Hospital was a disaster, with large pieces of debris reaching spectators situated 500 metres away on the opposite side of the lake at a designated safe viewing location. A twelve-year-old girl, Katie Bender, was killed instantly, and nine other people were injured. Large fragments of masonry and metal were found up to one kilometre from the demolition site. The main building did not fully disintegrate and was manually demolished afterwards.

== Aftermath ==
The ACT Government led by Chief Minister Kate Carnell was subject to sustained criticism, and a number of official inquiries were held. Some people complained the event should never have been made a public spectacle, as they felt this was inviting disaster. Carnell gave her full approval to promote the implosion as a public event, drawing a near-record Canberra crowd.

ACT Work Cover is the authority responsible for administering, implementing and enforcing legislation in the Australian Capital Territory covering occupational health and safety (OH&S), workers' compensation, dangerous substances and labour regulation. The coroner found that the authority did not follow established safety processes. It failed to ensure that the explosive workplan required by the ACT Demolition Code of Practice was met. It also failed to scrutinise departures from the original demolition workplans and to issue appropriate prohibition notices in accordance with the OH&S Act to ensure the methodology was safe, not only to the workplace employees but also to the public.

The ACT Government has since carried out two bridge implosions without prior notice, as part of the Gungahlin Drive Extension project. The first one was carried out in 2008, and the second one was carried out in 2010 at an early hour of a Saturday morning with a 1 km exclusion zone.

== In popular culture ==
The implosions were featured in news reel footage in the film Joe Cinque's Consolation (2016).
