= Ann Johnston =

Ann Johnston may refer to:

- Ann Johnston (figure skater) (1936–2022), Canadian figure skater
- Ann Johnston (American politician), former mayor of Stockton, California

== See also ==
- Anne Johnston (disambiguation)
