= Anna Johnston (doctor) =

Australian hematologist

- Born: Anna Bown; January 1, 1976 (age 50); Hobart, Australia
- Medical career
- Profession: Hematologist
- Awards: Young Australian of the Year (1994)

Anna Johnston (née Bown 1 January 1976) is an Australian haematologist for the Royal Hobart Hospital and director of bone marrow transplant of Tasmania. Johnston was named the Young Australian of the Year in 1994.

== Early life and education ==
Johnston was born on 1 January 1976 in Hobart, Australia. During high school, she competed in various sports and won language awards. Johnston won a gold medal at the 1993 International Biology Olympiad by herself and a silver medal with her team. She graduated with honors from the medicine program at the University of Sydney in 1999 and completed additional education at the Royal Prince Alfred Hospital in medicine.

== Career ==
Johnston began her training at the Royal North Shore Hospital in hematology. After completing additional training at the Canberra Hospital, Johnston was a fellow of the Centre Hospitalier Lyon-Sud in 2008. She started her medical career at the Royal Hobart Hospital in 2011. While at Royal Hobart Hospital, Johnston became the director of bone marrow transplant for the state of Tasmania and joined the Calvary Hospital, Hobart in 2015.

In 2017, Johnston joined an advisory board for Myeloma Australia and undertook a sabbatical at The Christie NHS Foundation Trust in Manchester, England. Johnston became a Tasmanian councillor of the Haematology Society of Australia and New Zealand. In October 2017, Johnston was promoted to honorary secretary for the Haematology Society with her term to end in October 2019.

== Awards and honors ==
In 1994, Johnston was named Young Australian of the Year.

== Personal life ==
Johnston is married with two children.
