= Anne Johnston (disambiguation) =

Anne Johnston (1932–2019) was a Toronto city councillor.

Anne Johnston may also refer to:

- Ann Johnston (figure skater) (1936–2022), Canadian former figure skater
- Anne Tracy Johnston, owner of Johnston-Felton-Hay House

== See also ==
- Annie Johnston (disambiguation)
- Ann Johnston (disambiguation)
- Anne Johnstone (disambiguation)
- Anna Johnston (disambiguation)
- Anne Johnson (disambiguation)
