= Canberra Hospital =

- ACT Health
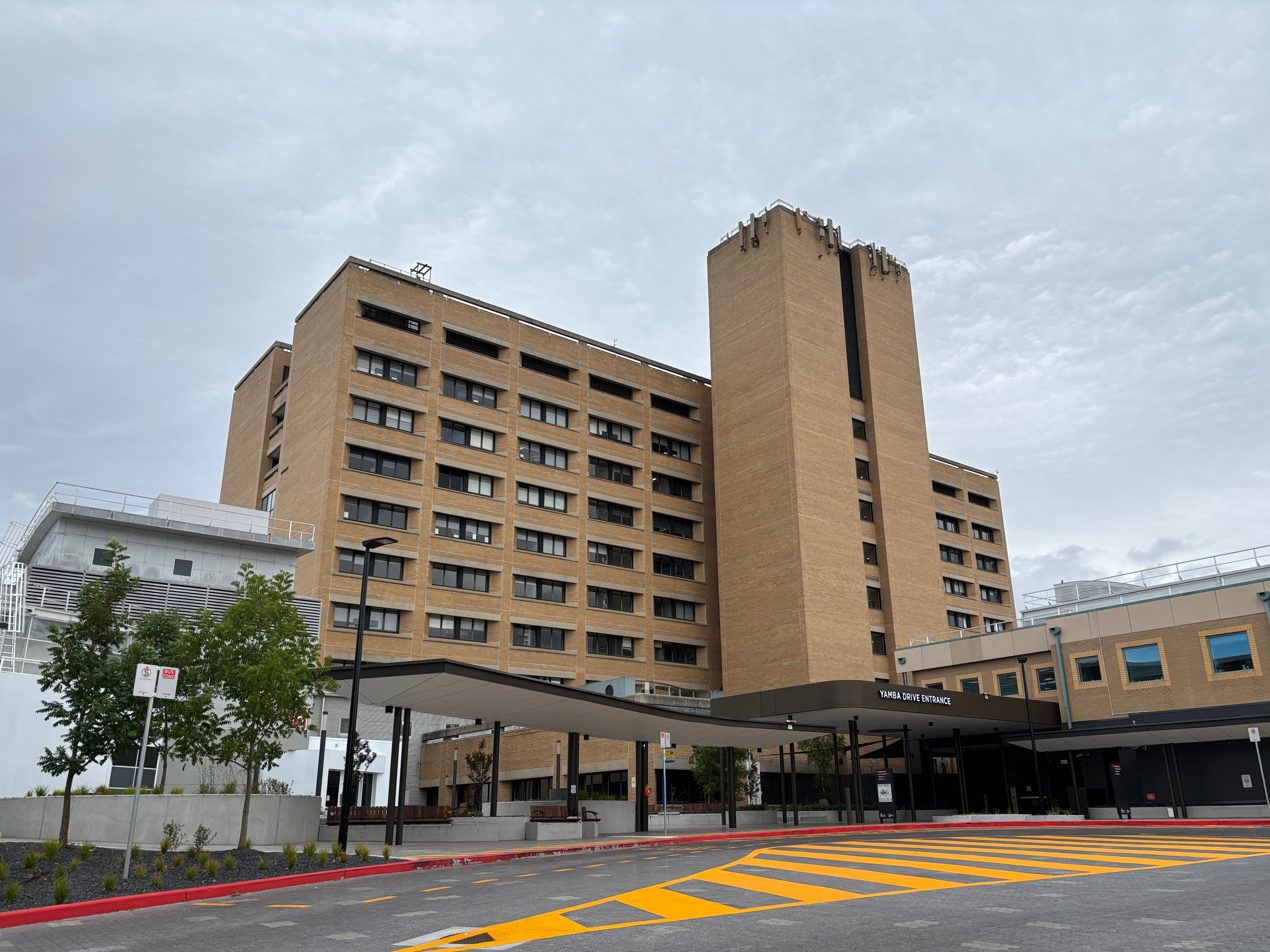
- Canberra Hospital in 2025

Geography
- Location: Yamba Drive, Woden Valley, Canberra, ACT, Australia
- Coordinates: 35.3454°S 149.1009°E

Organisation
- Care system: Public Medicare (Australia)
- Type: Teaching, District General
- Affiliated university: Australian National University; University of Canberra

Services
- Emergency department: Yes
- Beds: 672

Helipads
- Helipad: (ICAO: YXCB)
Number	Length		Surface
Number	ft	m	Surface
1			concrete

History
- Founded: 1914

Links
- Website: www.canberrahealthservices.act.gov.au
- Lists: Hospitals in Australia

Canberra Hospital is a public hospital located in Garran, Canberra, Australian Capital Territory. It is the largest district general hospital in the region with 672 beds catering to a population of about 550,000. It was formed when the Woden Valley Hospital and the Royal Canberra Hospital were amalgamated in 1991, and was renamed Canberra Hospital in 1996.

It is the main teaching hospital for the Australian National University Medical School. It is also a teaching hospital for the University of Canberra's School of Nursing. Furthermore, the hospital has strong links with the John Curtin School of Medical Research. The hospital is also a major regional centre for Clinical Pastoral Education, offering courses through the Canberra and Region Centre for Spiritual Care and Clinical Pastoral Education in association with the Sydney College of Divinity and New South Wales College of Clinical Pastoral Education.

== History ==
In May 1914 the Canberra Community Hospital, the first hospital for Canberra, was opened in Balmain Crescent, Acton with eight beds. Tents were used to supplement the isolation ward. There were no obstetric facilities and obstetrics patients had to travel to the Queanbeyan hospital.

In 1943 a new hospital was opened on the Acton Peninsula. Construction of the building was commenced in 1940. In 1942, the United States Army Medical Corps took over construction and commissioned it as an American military hospital. It was a military hospital for only five months. In February 1943, the hospital buildings were handed over to the Canberra Hospital Board for the development of what in time became the Royal Canberra Hospital on Acton Peninsula.

Woden Valley Hospital buildings were constructed between 1969 and 1973.

In 1973 the Woden Valley Hospital opened and the first patients were admitted.

In 1979 the Canberra Community Hospital was renamed the Royal Canberra Hospital.

Services were transferred to the Woden Valley Hospital when the Royal Canberra Hospital closed on 27 November 1991.

In 1996 Woden Valley Hospital was renamed Canberra Hospital and its first IVF baby was born on 26 December 1996.

On 13 July 1997 the superseded buildings on the Acton peninsula were demolished by implosion, killing a 12-year-old girl named Katie Bender who was hit by flying debris.

In 2010, the second operating theatre in Australia capable of performing intraoperative MRI scanning during surgery was completed.

In July 2022, construction commenced for the Surgical Procedures, Interventional Radiology and Emergency (SPIRE) Centre, with an estimated $661 million cost. The construction is meant to be complete in August 2024.

== Services and campus ==
Canberra Hospital provides a wide range of services across more than 25 buildings on its campus, including acute inpatient and day services, outpatient services, women's and children's services, paediatrics and pathology. A hospital campus map of the Canberra Hospital is available online.

Free public parking is available in numerous locations across the hospital campus including a multi-storey car park to the south of the Canberra Region Cancer Centre between Bateson Road and Hospital Road. Transport Canberra buses also serve Canberra Hospital from the Woden Bus Station, and interstate coach services are available to Queanbeyan and Yass.

== See also ==
- Canberra Coronavirus Field Hospital
- Healthcare in Australia
- Royal Canberra Hospital
- Lists of hospitals
- List of hospitals in Australia
- List of hospitals in the Australian Capital Territory
