= Annie Johnston (folklorist) =

Gaelic folklorist (1886–1963)

- Born: 10 February 1886; Isle of Barra, Scotland
- Died: March 6, 1963 (aged 77)
- Other name: Annag Aonghais Chaluim
- Occupation: Schoolteacher

Annie Johnston (10 February 1886 - 6 March 1963) was a Gaelic folklorist who contributed a variety of songs and stories from her native Barra to song collections and scholarly works in the early and mid-20th century. She was known for her expertise on waulking songs (òrain ruaidh), as well as her contributions to Marjory Kennedy-Fraser's well-known collection Songs of the Hebrides.

== Biography ==
Johnston (also called Annag Aonghais Chaluim) was born in Barra to Catherine McNeil and Angus Johnston, and was one of eight children. She remained in Barra for her entire life and became a schoolteacher, noted for her enthusiasm in passing on her knowledge of Gaelic traditions to the children she taught.

Johnston introduced song collectors to the waulking song, a type of traditional Scottish Gaelic song traditionally sung by women while they treated homespun cloth by rhythmically beating it upon boards (known as waulking or fulling). She performed many of the traditional songs she learned during her childhood in Barra, including over 40 songs recorded for Kennedy-Fraser, and was known for her willingness to collaborate with and educate collectors who wished to record traditional songs. Today her performances make up a valuable part of the collection of the University of Edinburgh's School of Scottish Studies.
