= Marcus de Laune Faunce =

Australian physician (1922–2004)

Marcus de Laune Faunce (5 December 1922 – 14 June 2004) was a Canberra consultant physician, head of Royal Canberra Hospital, doctor to five Australian Prime Ministers and six Governors-General of Australia and former Senior Physician Consultant to the RAAF.

== Early medical career ==
Faunce was educated at St Peter's College, Adelaide, before attending medical school at the University of Adelaide. In 1943, during his time there, he won first place in Anatomy and Physiology.

In 1946, after obtaining his medical qualifications, he served in the Australian Army Medical Corps as part of the British Commonwealth Occupation Force in post-war Japan, near Hiroshima. Upon discharge he sailed to England and studied at the Royal Postgraduate Medical School at Hammersmith Hospital.

On returning to Australia, he became Senior Registrar at Sydney Hospital in 1949 before From 1954 until 1956 Faunce attained further postgraduate skills in respiratory medicine at the Brompton Hospital in London and later obtained Fellowships of the Royal College of Physicians of London and the Royal Australasian College of Physicians. In 1966 he was elected a Fellow of the American College of Chest Physicians (being sponsored by Sir Harry Wunderly and Dr Hilary Roche). Faunce and his wife Marjorie moved to Canberra in 1957, where Faunce soon established himself as a consultant physician in private practise and as a part-time salaried specialist with the Commonwealth anti-tuberculosis campaign.

== Personal Life ==
Born in Sydney on 5 December 1922, he married Marjorie Morison in 1951. Marjorie was born in Nowra, on the 10th of February 1927, and was a journalist with the Sydney Morning Herald. Marjorie died in 1995.

Late in life Fauce was diagnosed with renal cancer, on the 14th of June 2004 died in Canberra.

Fauce had two sons - Thomas and Marcus - and daughter, Charlotte.

== Service at Royal Canberra Hospital ==
During his 35 years in full-time practice, Faunce became recognised for his diagnostic skills, for his high standards of professional ethics and his concern for the medical, personal and social needs of his patients.

Bill Burke, a trainee of Faunce who would become a notable respiratory physician in Canberra, stated: "Ebullient, military in his gait and bearing, [Faunce] was prone to swing onto the ward stepping out to his own loudly-whistled accompaniment of the Colonel Bogey march. He was knowledgeable yet always looking to expand his knowledge, and his visits to the patient's bedside in even the most dire circumstances had a therapeutic effect seldom available in the pharmacopoeia."

Faunce was individually selected to be honorary personal physician to five Prime Ministers (including Gough Whitlam and Malcolm Fraser) and six Governors-General (including Sir Zelman Cowen, Sir Ninian Stephen, and The Hon. Bill Hayden). Faunce was Prime Minister Harold Holt's personal physician at the time of the latter's disappearance in the surf at Portsea; his treatment at that time of Holt's shoulder injury and refusal to prescribe opiates featured in the 2008 film The Prime Minister is Missing.

In 1959, Faunce and fellow physician Tony Proust founded the Canberra Medical Society, whose meetings were initially held in the Howard Florey lecture theatre of the John Curtin School of Medical Research, through the courtesy of its director. Marc served on the ACT Medical Board from 1963–74 and was senior physician consultant to the RAAF Medical Directorate from 1976–1980 with the rank of group captain.

Faunce was largely responsible for the creation of the Department of Respiratory Medicine at the Royal Canberra Hospital in 1978. He had a great affection for the old Royal Canberra Hospital on the Acton Peninsula, serving on its Board of Management from 1967–74. Marc protested against its demolition and he was appointed emeritus consultant upon its closure in 1993. Faunce was an inspiring teacher and had long been a staunch advocate for a medical school at the Australian National University. Marc had a close friendship with Professor Frank Fenner and was highly respected in the Canberra medical community.

== Honours ==
For his service to Australian prime ministers and governors general, Faunce was awarded the Commander of the Royal Victorian Order in 1995. For his public service as senior physician consultant to the RAAF Medical Directorate, he was awarded the OBE in 1969 and made a member of the Military Division of the Order of Australia (AM) in 1981.

== Bibliography ==
- Proust, A. J., ed. (1994). History of Medicine in Canberra and Queanbeyan and Their Hospitals. Gundaroo: Brolga Press. ISBN 1-875495-12-6.
