= Acton Peninsula =

Peninsula on Lake Burley Griffin in Canberra, Australia

Coordinates: 35.291°S 149.118°E

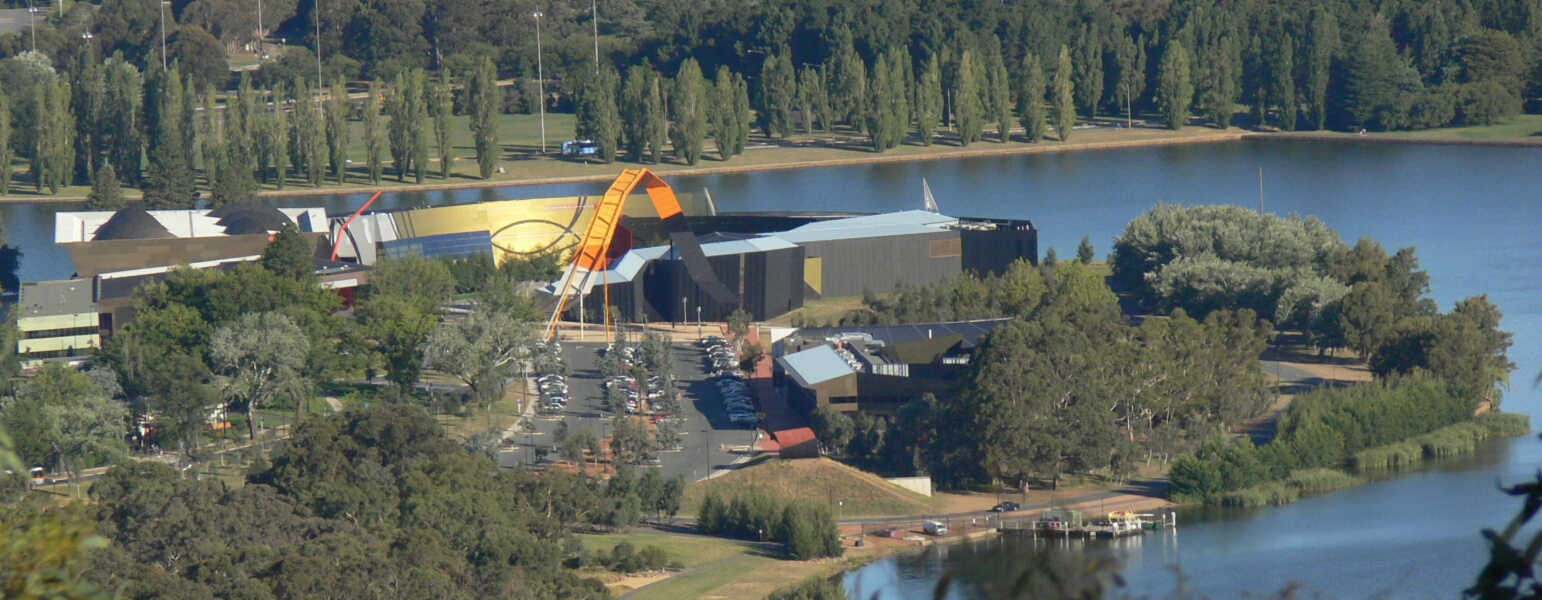
The southern tip of the Acton Peninsula in 2006

The Acton Peninsula is located on the northern shore of Lake Burley Griffin, in the centre of Canberra, the capital of Australia.

It was created when the lake was artificially built by damming the Molonglo River and excavating around it to create the desired shape.

The Royal Canberra Hospital used to be prominently located there, jutting out prominently into the lake. The hospital was demolished in 1997, and replaced by the National Museum of Australia in 2001.
