= Anne Johnson =

British archaeologist

Anne Johnson FSA, a British archaeologist and historical researcher, is a specialist in the archaeology of Roman forts of the early empire in Britain and the German Provinces. She studied archaeology and was awarded her doctorate at University College, Cardiff. Her book on first and second century Roman Britain was published in Britain (1983) and Germany (1987). It was reviewed as a "thorough, descriptive treatment of Roman military bases in the western empire not only offers an invaluable reference work for the specialist interested in Roman military architecture but also provides the raw material for insight into imperial policy along the western frontiers in the early empire" and noted as the first comprehensive account of Roman forts since Harald von Petrikovits' 1975 work 'Die Innenbauten romischer Legionslager'. Since 1989 she has worked as an archaeological and historical consultant in Oxford. Other publications include work on Roman military granaries. In 2018 she was elected as a Fellow of the Society of Antiquaries.
