= Anna Johnson Gates =

American politician

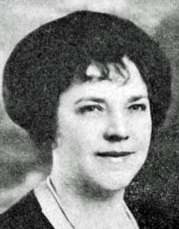
- Born: January 25, 1889
- Died: January 12, 1939 (aged 49)
- Occupations: Politician, Suffragist
- Known for: first woman elected to the West Virginia Legislature

Anna Johnson Gates (January 25, 1889 - January 12, 1939) was an American suffragist and Progressive Era politician who was the first woman elected to the West Virginia Legislature.

She married Harry Gates, and after his death, she married Tom Gates in 1915.

== Women's civic clubs ==
Gates was active in the General Federation of Women's Clubs. In the 1920s, she was the founder of the Charleston Business and Professional Women's Club, and the Women's Democratic Executive Committee.

== Political career ==
Gates began her political career by working with suffrage organizations in Kanawha County, distinguishing herself as an activist and gaining respect in the community. She remained politically active after women gained the right to vote and established herself as a successful voice for the Democratic Party in her area of West Virginia. She served as associate chairman of the Democratic executive committee of Kanawha County in 1920. In July 1922, Gates announced her candidacy for a seat in the West Virginia House of Delegates. Her election would make her the first women to hold a seat in the West Virginia Legislator.

=== West Virginia legislator ===
Gates was a trailblazer with her accomplishments as a female legislator in West Virginia in the 1920s. During her first speech as a member of the West Virginia Legislature, Gates commented, “Women in most states are awakening to their political responsibilities. The women do not urge the election of women as women, but believe women should be represented in office, and only ask for cooperation.”

While in the legislature, Gates served as the Chairperson of the Committee on Arts, Science and General Improvements. She also was on the prohibition and temperance, education, humane institution and public buildings, and medicine and sanitation committees.

== Later community service ==
Although Gates did not seek reelection for her seat in the Legislature, she continued to remain politically active and served on the city and county Democratic committees. She was a delegate to the 1932 National Democratic Convention in Chicago when Franklin D. Roosevelt was nominated as the candidate for President of the United States.

=== Red Cross ===
Gates volunteered for the Red Cross during World War II, and she was the secretary of Charleston Board of Affairs.

== Death and legacy ==
Gates died at age 49 after an illness of more than three years after receiving treatment at the Mayo Clinic at Rochester, MN. She is buried in Spring Hill Cemetery in Charleston.
