= John Curtin School of Medical Research =

Australian research institute

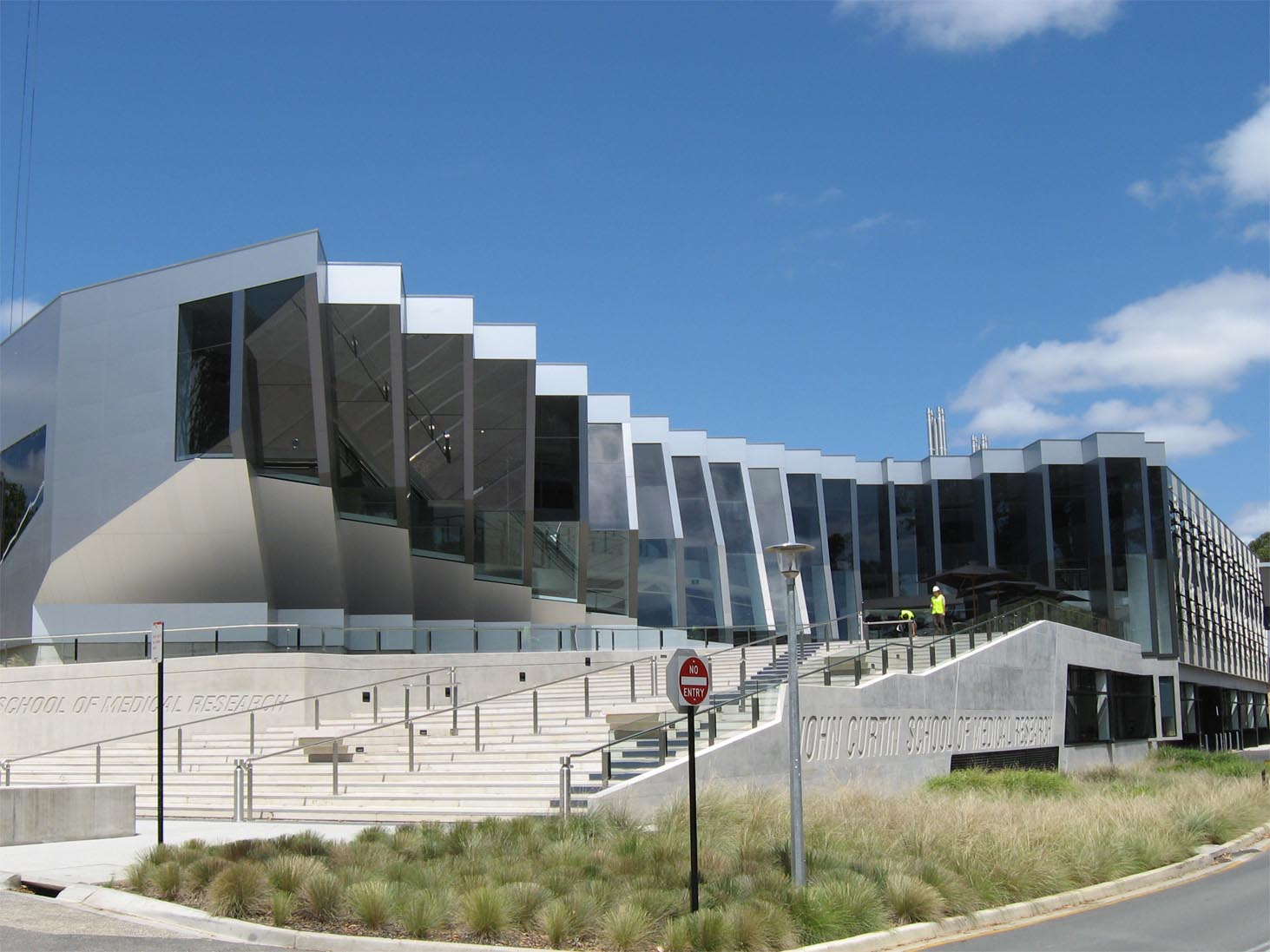
- The John Curtin School of Medical Research
- Founder: Sir Howard Florey
- Established: 1948; 78 years ago
- Mission: Translational medical research and postgraduate education
- Focus: Multidisciplinary
- Faculty: Australian National University Medical School
- Adjunct faculty: Canberra Hospital
- Key people: Nobel Laureates: Sir Howard Florey; Sir John Eccles AC, FRS, FAA; Peter Doherty AC, FRS; Rolf M. Zinkernagel AC, FAA; Other notable researchers: Gordon Ada AO, FAA; Frank Fenner AC, CMG, MBE, FRS, FAA; Sir Hugh Ennor CBE; David Roderick Curtis AC, FRACP, FAA, FRS; Chris Goodnow FRS, FAA
- Owner: Australian National University
- Location: Acton, Canberra, Australian Capital Territory, Australia
- Coordinates: 35°16′55″S 149°06′54″E
- Interactive map of John Curtin School of Medical Research
- Website: jcsmr.anu.edu.au

The John Curtin School of Medical Research (JCSMR) is an Australian multidisciplinary translational medical research institute and postgraduate education centre that forms part of the Australian National University (ANU) in Canberra. The school was founded in 1948 as a result of the vision of Nobel Laureate Sir Howard Florey and was named in honour of Australia's World War II Prime Minister John Curtin, who had died in office a few years earlier.

In addition to Florey, Sir John Eccles AC, FRS, FAA (1963), Peter Doherty AC, FRS and Rolf M. Zinkernagel AC, FAA (1996), were Nobel Laureates as a result of research conducted at the JCSMR. Other notable researchers include Gordon Ada AO, FAA, Frank Fenner AC, CMG, MBE, FRS, FAA, Sir Hugh Ennor CBE, David Roderick Curtis AC, FRACP, FAA, FRS and Chris Goodnow FRS, FAA.

The JCSMR comprises three divisions: the Division of Immunology and Infectious Diseases, the Division of Genome Sciences and Cancer, and the Eccles Institute of Neuroscience.

== Research focus ==
In the Division of Immunology and Infectious Diseases (IID) at JCSMR the key focus areas are mechanisms of immunity to infection, the longevity of immunity and immunological memory, immunodeficiency syndromes, mechanisms of leukocyte differentiation, trafficking, growth control that are pertinent to cancer, immunological tolerance, autoimmunity, allergy and immunodeficiency.

== JCSMR facilities ==
Completed as three buildings in stages over seven years by Hindmarsh Construction Australia at a cost of A$130 million, the design of the building is influenced by the DNA double helix and provides education, conference, and secure research laboratory facilities. Parts of the School were filmed during the making of the drama series, The Code, broadcast on ABC TV during 2014 and 2016.

On 28 August 2006, the new ACRF Biomolecular Resource Facility was officially opened within the JCSMR, a new facility focusing on investigating the molecular aspects of cancer biology. The facility was partially supported by a A$1.13 million grant awarded in 2004 by the Australian Cancer Research Foundation.

Major action star Jackie Chan made donations to the School, with the Director in 2006 announcing the Jackie Chan Science Centre was named in his honour; and was opened by Chan in 2008.

== See also ==
- Health in Australia
