= Anne Johnstone =

Anne Johnstone may refer to:

- Anne Graham Johnstone (1928–1998), artist
- Anne Johnstone (badminton), Scottish badminton player
- Ann Johnstone Heaphy from 2007 Birthday Honours

== See also ==
- Anne Johnston (disambiguation)
