= Annie Johnson (brewer) =

Brewer

- Born: Germany
- Occupation: Brewer
- Years active: 1999–present
- Employer: PicoBrew
- Organizations: American Homebrewers Association; Pink Boots Society
- Known for: Homebrewer of the Year (2013)
- Title: Chief Brewing Officer; Brewmaster
- Awards: Homebrewer of the Year (2013); Pilsner Urquell Master Homebrewer (2012)

Annie Johnson is a brewer who won the American Homebrewers Associations' Homebrewer of the Year award in 2013. She was the first woman in thirty years, and the first African American person ever, to win the award. In 2012, she won Pilsner Urquell's Master Homebrewer Competition held in San Francisco, where Master Brewer Vaclav Berka (Czech Republic) said the beer tasted like he was home. After an extensive career with the California State Legislature she began working for PicoBrew, a product development company in Seattle, WA that specialized in automated brewing equipment. In addition to that work, she is a Nationally ranked judge for the Beer Judge Certification Program and serves as proctor and exam grader. Shortly after she had heard about winning the AHA 2013 award she quickly accepted her job offer to be part of PicoBrew as Chief Brewing Office and recipe developer. She's an active member of Pink Boots Society which promotes women in the beverage industry, and as an elected member of American Homebrewers Association's Governing Committee. She is a regularly featured contributor to Craft Beer & Brewing Magazine.

== Biography ==
Born in Germany, Johnson was exposed early as a child to beer and food culture in Europe. Her birth mother Colette, an Irish immigrant, met Johnson's father who was an African-American soldier stationed in Germany. Colette worked as a (au pair) housemaid in Germany. Colette, pregnant with Johnson, feared religious repercussions returning to her Irish-Catholic family in Ireland. Colette made the decision to put Johnson up for adoption before she returned to Ireland. Johnson had been adopted by Collette's employers, the Johnsons, at four days old. Johnson's adoptive parents worked for the U.S Department of Defence which required traveling across Europe. Johnson traveled the world exploring various beer and food cultures which inspired Johnson to start home-brewing when she moved to the United States. Johnson was particularly fascinated with her adoptive mother's beer stein collection which complemented the thriving European brewing scene. In 1999, Johnson and her friends bought a home-brewing kit while living in Sacramento, CA. Johnson experimented with American Lagers, Czech Pils, and American IPAs. Johnson fell in love with home-brewing as hobby. Johnson's friends moved to Delaware, but left all the home-brewing equipment with Johnson which allowed her to keep brewing. Johnson continued to brew on her own while also entering various brewing competitions in California. Johnson's first win came in 2001 when she entered The California State Fair homebrew competition with an American Amber Ale. Just prior to winning the National Homebrewer of the Year Award in 2013, Johnson relocated to Philadelphia where she attempted to reconnect with her birth father. Shortly after, she became very ill. After series of tests, she was diagnosed with Graves’ disease. With a low expectation of winning, Johnson won the National Homebrewer of the Year award in 2013. Shortly thereafter, she moved to Seattle to start a new career for PicoBrew up to the receivership in early 2020 when production facilities and staffing were cut. Johnson has medaled in all BJCP styles and sub-styles.

== Professional history ==
Johnson worked as an Information Technology Specialist with the State of California's Office of Legislative Counsel from May 1994 to August 2011. She moved and became the Director and Brewmaster of PicoBrew, a Seattle-based company that produced cloud-based brewing/distillation equipment. PicoBrew's equipment is intended to be easy and accessible to homebrewers and distillers, and to be able to use a set of recipes in a digital library that the PicoBrew equipment -such as the Zymatic home brewing system- and anyone who owns it has access to. Also following her relocation to Seattle, Johnson started working as the Brewmaster for the Bluebird Microcreamery and Brewery, which is a brewery/ice cream shop that specializes in dessert beers. Respectively, Johnson has been with the companies from January 2014 and August 2016 to 2020. Johnson returned to the OLC in 2022 to present.

== Notable accomplishments ==
- Johnson's first competition in the brewing field was the California State Fair in 2001. She won first place with her American Amber Ale. In 2014, she shared the recipe publicly.
- In 2004 Johnson received the Queen of Beer award after winning four first place categories as best in show.
- In 2012 Johnson entered and won the Pilsner Urquell’s Master Homebrewer located in San Francisco, California.
- Johnson's Lite American Lager and Mow the Dam Lawn brews won the 2013 National Homebrewer of the Year award in competition with 8,200 beers entered in the competition.
- Annie Johnson serves as a national beer judge (link BJCP) and also has contributed many recipes to PicoBrew's library.
- In 2019 Johnson was awarded the 2020 American Brewers Guild scholarship.
- In 2020 Johnson was nominated for the American Homebrewer Association's Governing Committee where she will serve 3 years.
