= Peter Doherty (immunologist) =

Australian immunologist Nobel laureate (born 1940)

Peter Doherty AC FRS FMedSci
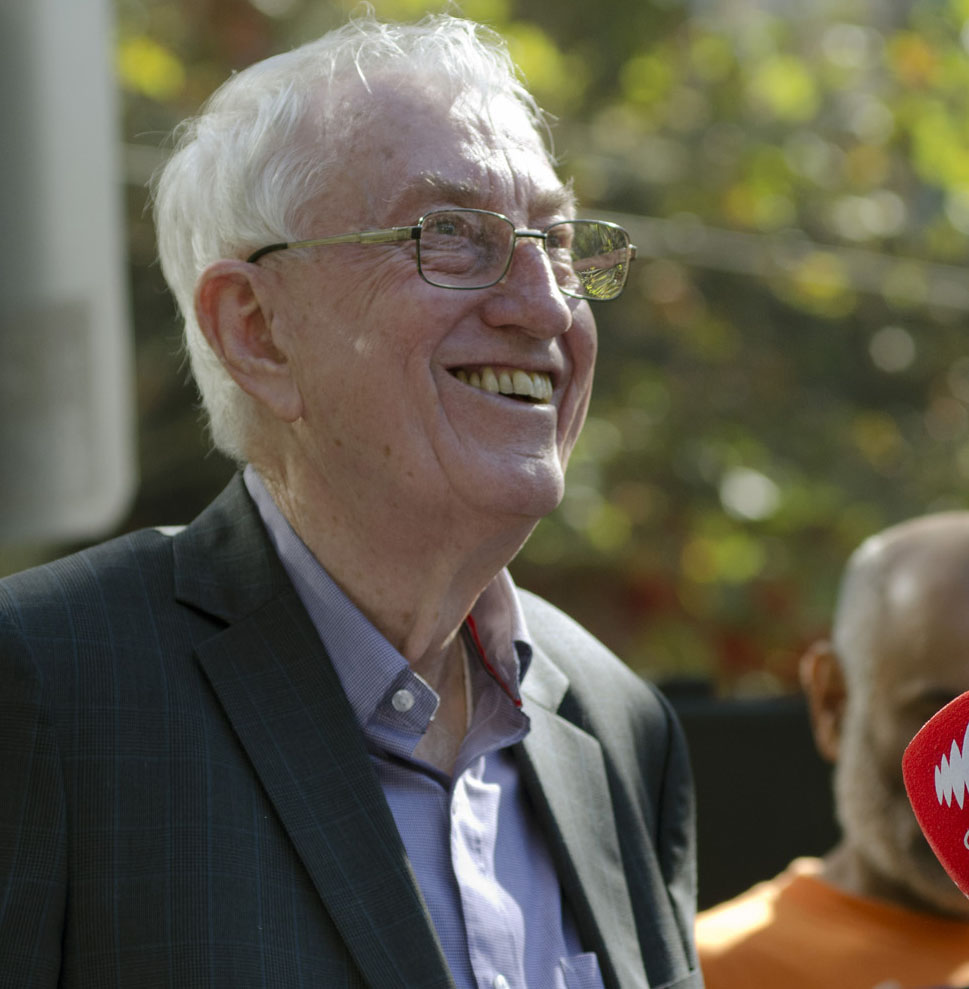
- Born: Peter Charles Doherty; 15 October 1940 (age 86); Brisbane, Queensland, Australia
- Education: University of Queensland; University of Edinburgh
- Known for: Major histocompatibility complex
- Awards: Paul Ehrlich and Ludwig Darmstaedter Prize (1983); Nobel Prize in Physiology or Medicine (1996); Australian of the Year (1997); Leeuwenhoek Lecture (1999)
- Scientific career
- Fields: Medicine; Immunology
- Workplaces: John Curtin School of Medical Research; Australian National University; Trinity College Dublin
- Thesis: Studies in the experimental pathology of louping-ill encephalitis (1970)
- Doctoral advisor: G. L. Montgomery; J. T. Stamp

Peter Charles Doherty (born 15 October 1940) is an Australian immunologist and Nobel laureate.

Doherty received the Albert Lasker Award for Basic Medical Research in 1995, the Nobel Prize in Physiology or Medicine jointly with Rolf M. Zinkernagel in 1996 and was named Australian of the Year in 1997. In the Australia Day Honours of 1997, he was named a Companion of the Order of Australia for his work with Zinkernagel. He is also a National Trust Australian Living Treasure.

In 2009 as part of the Q150 celebrations, Doherty's immune system research was announced as one of the Q150 Icons of Queensland for its role as an iconic "innovation and invention". In 2012, Doherty was appointed as an Honorary Professor in the School of Biochemistry and Immunology at Trinity College Dublin.

== Early life and education ==
Peter Charles Doherty was born in the Brisbane suburb of Sherwood on 15 October 1940, to Eric Charles Doherty and Linda Doherty (née Byford). He grew up in Oxley, and attended Indooroopilly State High School (which now has a lecture theatre named after him).

After receiving his bachelor's degree in veterinary science in 1962 from the University of Queensland, he was a rural veterinary officer for the Queensland Department of Agriculture and Stock before taking up laboratory-based work at the Department's Animal Research Institute. There he met microbiology graduate Penelope Stephens and they were married in 1965. Doherty received his master's degree in veterinary science in 1966 from the University of Queensland.

He obtained his PhD in pathology in 1970 from the University of Edinburgh, Scotland, then returned to Australia to continue his research at the John Curtin School of Medical Research within the Australian National University in Canberra.

== Research and career ==
In 1988, Peter Doherty joined St. Jude Children's Research Hospital in Memphis, Tennessee as the Chair of the Department of Immunology, which he retained until 2001. Doherty's research focused on the immune system and his Nobel Prize-winning work described how the body's immune cells protect against viruses. He and Rolf Zinkernagel, the co-recipient of the 1996 Nobel Prize in Physiology or Medicine, discovered how T cells recognise their target antigens in combination with major histocompatibility complex (MHC) proteins.

Viruses infect host cells and reproduce inside them. Killer T-cells destroy those infected cells so that the viruses cannot reproduce. In landmark mouse studies of lymphocytic-choriomeningitis virus (LCMV), Rolf Zinkernagel and Doherty demonstrated that a T cell recognises an infected target only when it simultaneously detects (i) a viral peptide antigen and (ii) a self-specific molecule of the major histocompatibility complex class I (MHC I) displayed on the target-cell surface. This recognition was done by a T-cell receptor on the surface of the T cell.

The MHC was previously identified as being responsible for the rejection of incompatible tissues during transplantation. Zinkernagel and Doherty discovered that the MHC was responsible for the body fighting meningitis viruses too.

== Awards and honours ==
Doherty was elected a Fellow of the Australian Academy of Science (FAA) in 1983 and a Fellow of the Royal Society (FRS) in 1987. In 1997, he received the Golden Plate Award of the American Academy of Achievement. He is the patron of the eponymous Peter Doherty Institute for Infection and Immunity (Doherty Institute), a joint venture between the University of Melbourne and Melbourne Health. It houses a group of infection and immunology experts, including Director Professor Sharon Lewin, who are charged with leading the battle against infectious diseases in humans. This became operational in 2014. He became an Honorary Fellow of the Academy of Medical Sciences (FMedSci) in 2015. In the same year he was elected Fellow of the Australian Academy of Health and Medical Sciences (FAHMS). In April 2017 he was inducted as a Fellow of the Royal Society of Victoria (FRSV).

John Monash Science School, Moreton Bay Boys College, and Murrumba State Secondary College each have a house named after him.

== Non academic publications ==
- Doherty, Peter (2022). Empire, war, tennis and me. [S.l.]: MELBOURNE UNIV PRESS. ISBN 978-0-522-87856-1. OCLC 1302578051.
- Doherty, Peter (2021). An insider's plague year. Carlton, Vic.: Melbourne University Publishing. ISBN 978-0-522-87751-9. OCLC 1258120542.
- Doherty, P. C. (2018). The incidental tourist : on the road with a globetrotting Nobel Prize winner. Carlton, Victoria: Melbourne University Publishing. ISBN 978-0-522-87172-2. OCLC 1048246796.
- Doherty, P. C. (2015). The knowledge wars. Carlton, Vic.: Melbourne University Publishing. ISBN 978-0-522-86285-0. OCLC 908193218.
- Doherty, P. C. (2013). Pandemics : what everyone needs to know. Oxford: Oxford University Press. ISBN 978-0-19-989811-4. OCLC 851695304.
- Doherty, Peter (2012). Sentinel chickens : what birds can tell us about our health and our world. Carlton, Vic.: Melbourne University Publishing. ISBN 978-0-522-86110-5. OCLC 781878873.
- Doherty, Peter Charles (2007). A light history of hot air. Carlton, Vic.: Melbourne University Press. ISBN 978-0-522-85407-7. OCLC 225591871.
- Doherty, P. C. (2006). The beginner's guide to winning the Nobel prize : a life in science. New York: Columbia University Press. ISBN 978-0-231-13896-3. OCLC 232160284.

== Personal life ==
As of 2021, Peter Doherty and his wife Penny live in Melbourne. They have two sons, Michael, a neurologist working in the United States, and James, a Melbourne-based barrister, and six grandchildren. He gained a renewed level of fame in 2020 during the COVID-19 pandemic when he accidentally tweeted the phrase 'Dan Murphy opening hours' instead of performing a web search for it.

Doherty currently spends three months of the year conducting research at St. Jude Children's Research Hospital in Memphis, Tennessee, where he is a faculty member at the University of Tennessee Health Science Center through the College of Medicine. For the other 9 months of the year, he works in the Department of Microbiology and Immunology at the University of Melbourne, Victoria.
