= Rolf M. Zinkernagel =

Swiss immunologist (born 1944)

Rolf Zinkernagel AC
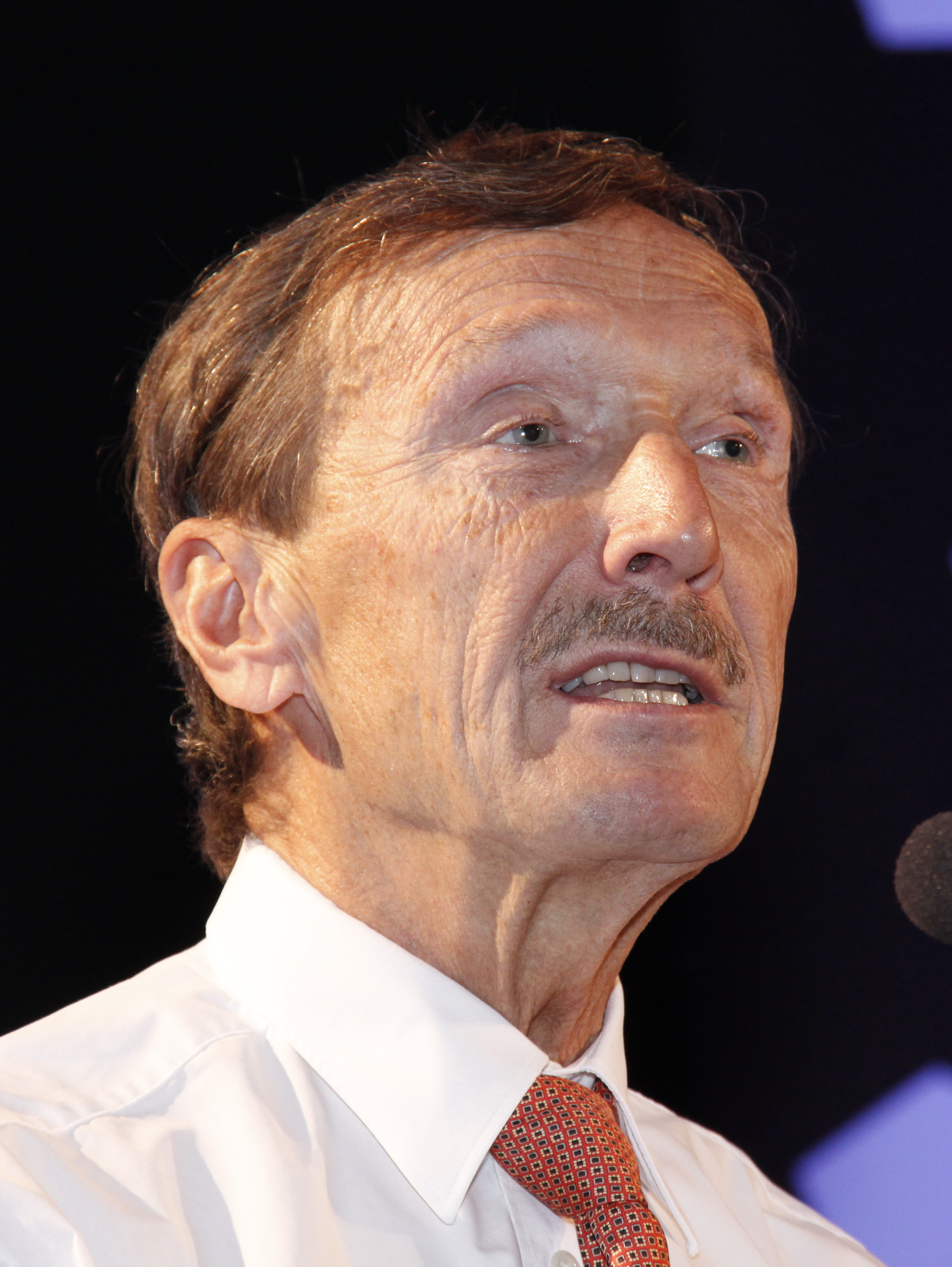
- Zinkernagel in 2011
- Born: 6 January 1944 (age 82); Riehen, Basel-Stadt, Switzerland
- Education: Australian National University (PhD, 1975); University of Basel (MD, 1970)
- Known for: Cytotoxic T cells
- Awards: Ernst Jung Prize (1982); Paul Ehrlich and Ludwig Darmstaedter Prize (1983); Mack-Forster Prize (1985); Gairdner Foundation International Award (1986); Louis-Jeantet Prize for Medicine (1988); Christoforo Colombo Award (1992); Albert Lasker Medical Research Award (1995); Nobel Prize in Physiology or Medicine (1996); AC (1999); FAA
- Scientific career
- Fields: Immunology
- Institutions: University of Zurich
- Thesis: The role of the H-2 gene complex in cell-mediated immunity to viral and bacterial infections in mice (1975)
- Website: www.immunology.uzh.ch/aboutus/emeriti/zinkernagel.html

Rolf Martin Zinkernagel AC (born 6 January 1944) is a professor of experimental immunology at the University of Zurich. Along with Peter C. Doherty, he shared the 1996 Nobel Prize in Physiology or Medicine for the discovery of how the immune system recognizes virus-infected cells.

== Education ==
Zinkernagel received his MD degree from the University of Basel in 1970 and his PhD from the Australian National University in 1975.

== Career and research ==
Zinkernagel is a member of the Cancer Research Institute Scientific Advisory Council, the American Academy of Arts and Sciences, The National Academy of Sciences, the American Philosophical Society, and The Academy of Cancer Immunology. Zinkernagel was elected as a Corresponding Fellow to the Australian Academy of Science also in 1996.

== Awards and honours ==
Together with the Australian Peter C. Doherty he received the 1996 Nobel Prize in Physiology or Medicine for the discovery of how the immune system recognizes virus-infected cells. With this he became the 24th Swiss Nobel laureate. In 1999 he was awarded an honorary Companion of the Order of Australia (AC), Australia's highest civilian honour, for his scientific work with Doherty.

Viruses infect host cells and reproduce inside them. Killer T-cells destroy those infected cells so that the viruses cannot reproduce. Zinkernagel and Doherty discovered that for killer T-cells to recognize infected cells, they had to recognize two molecules on the surface of the cell—not only the virus antigen, but also a molecule of the major histocompatibility complex class I (MHC I). This dual recognition is mediated by the T-cell receptor. Although MHC molecules were first known for causing transplant rejection, Zinkernagel and Doherty demonstrated that MHC I–restricted recognition is also central to the immune control of viruses such as lymphocytic choriomeningitis virus, establishing a key principle of antiviral immunity.

In addition to the Nobel Prize, he also won the Cloëtta Prize in 1981, the Cancer Research Institute William B. Coley Award in 1987, the Otto-Naegeli-Preis in 1988 and the Albert Lasker Medical Research Award in 1995. In 1994 he became a member of the German Academy of Sciences Leopoldina.
