= Nature Conservation Act 2014 =

Australian territory-based act of parliament

ACT Legislative Assembly

The Nature Conservation Act 2014 (NC Act) is a territory-based act of parliament in the Australian Capital Territory (ACT). The NC Act is "the chief legislation for the protection of native plants and animals in the ACT and for the management of the conservation reserve network", providing for management of conservation lands and the legislative framework for nature conservation policy and action in the ACT.

Offences under the act are regulated by the Magistrates Court (Nature Conservation Infringement Notices) Regulation 2015.

== History ==
The act was passed on 27 November 2014 by the ACT Legislative Assembly and commenced on 11 June 2015, replacing the Nature Conservation Act 1980. The Nature Conservation Amendment Act 2016 amended the NC Act on 07 June 2016 (bringing it into line with the national EPBC Act and other states and territories, and its latest amendment came into force on 11 June 2020.
