= Royal Canberra Hospital =

Former hospital in Canberra, Australia

Coordinates: 35.293°S 149.121°E

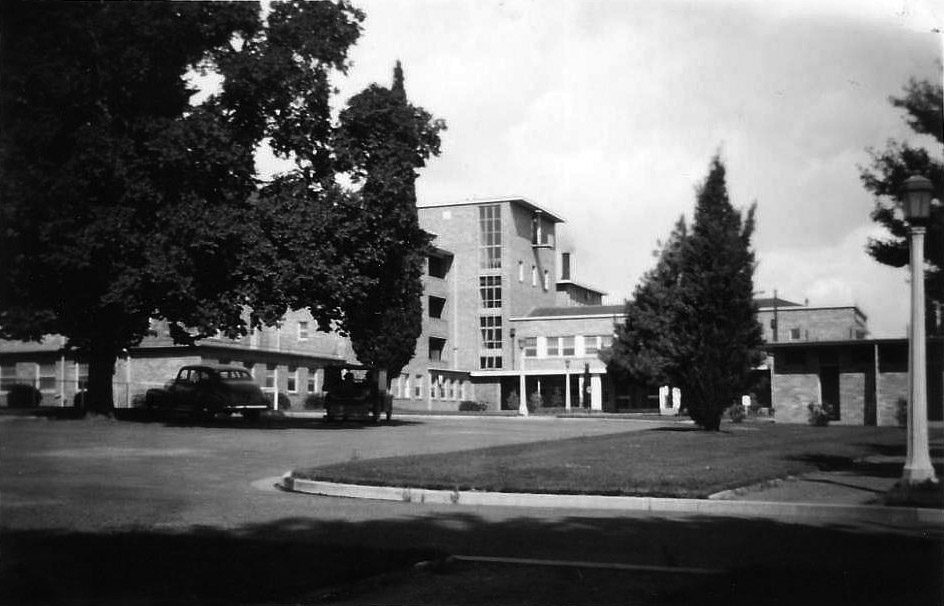
Royal Canberra Hospital on Acton Peninsula 1948

Royal Canberra Hospital was the name used between 1972 and 1991 for a public hospital located on Acton Peninsula in Canberra. Between its construction in 1942 and its renaming in 1972, the hospital was known as briefly as Acton Peninsula Hospital and then as Canberra Community Hospital.

The first hospital in Canberra was the Canberra Hospital on Balmain Crescent Acton in 1914, predominantly serving the workers building the new capital of Canberra. From 1929, it was called the Canberra Community Hospital after additions to the building, which became necessary due to the influx of government staff following the opening of Parliament in Canberra in 1927.

In 1942, a new hospital was built on Acton Peninsula. It was also known as the Canberra Community Hospital, until 1972, when it was renamed the Royal Canberra Hospital. It was the major hospital in Canberra before being closed in 1991. The main hospital building was demolished in 1997.

== History ==
=== Early years 1912–1939 ===
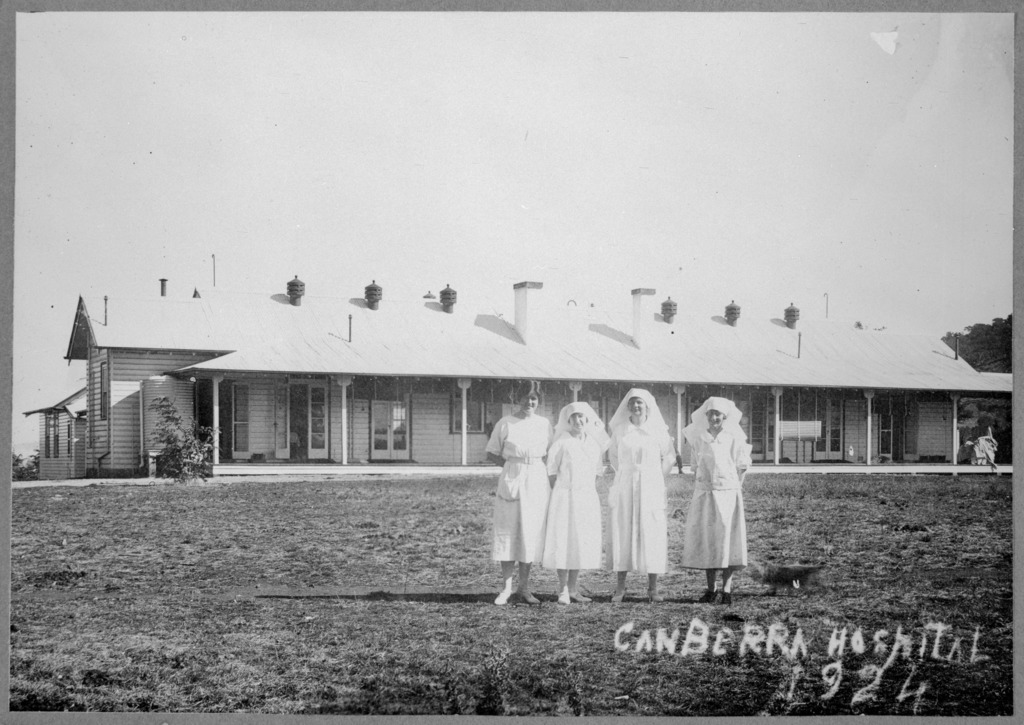
Nursing staff and ward block, Canberra Hospital, 1924

In 1912, Dr W. Perrin Norris, Commonwealth Director of Quarantine and medical adviser to the Commonwealth, recommended that a government hospital be built on a 10-acre (4.0 ha) site at Acton that had been reserved for this purpose, with separate facilities for isolation. This was in immediate response to cases of diphtheria amongst construction workers requiring lengthy isolation and hospitalisation, as well as measles and chicken pox. At this time there were few other public buildings in Canberra. The interim hospital site was on Balmain Crescent, in the precinct of the future Australian National University.

The building, refurbished in the late 1920s, still stands at the intersection with Mills Road, leading to the John Curtin School of Medical Research. It is used by the Research School of Earth Sciences, ANU. A plaque on the front lawn, unveiled in 1978 by the then Minister of Health Ralph Hunt, identifies it as the site of the first public hospital in Canberra.

The Acton Peninsula site originally reserved for the formal Canberra Hospital extended from Canberra House (in 1938 the residence of the British High Commissioner) to the Molonglo River (Lennox Crossing). Dr J. Frederick Watson of Gungahlin gave evidence to the Parliamentary Standing Committee on Public Works considering construction of the new brick hospital on Acton Peninsula. He stated that in determining the size of the hospital, the possibility of a medical school within the proposed university (adjacent to the new hospital) should be borne in mind.

Two nurses who worked at Canberra Community Hospital on Acton in the 1930s were killed while serving in the Second World War. Sister Mona Tait, who had been a theatre sister in Canberra, was aboard the Vyner Brooke when it was sunk by the Japanese military, and was subsequently amongst the nurses machine-gunned at Radji Beach (see Banka Island massacre). Sister May Hayman was working in the hospital at Gona in New Guinea at the outbreak of war, and while fleeing with Allied soldiers was ambushed by a Japanese patrol and bayoneted.

=== War years 1940–1947 ===
The foundations for what was then called the "Acton Peninsula Hospital" began in August 1940. The foundation stone was laid by the Minister for Health, the Hon. Sir Frederick Stewart, on 28 January 1941. In March 1942, the Australian Army requisitioned it for the 2/2 Army General Hospital. Before it could be occupied, the 2/2 AGH was relocated to Queensland and the United States Armed Forces were given use of the new Canberra Hospital to treat wounded personnel from their forces in the Pacific. Officers and nurses of the 5th Station Hospital of the United States Army Medical Corps, as well as Dutch medical and dental officers, treated patients at the site. In January 1943, the US Army relinquished the hospital, after realising it was too far away to transport its wounded servicemen.

The hospital was officially opened for civilian use by the Governor General, Lord Gowrie, on 20 February 1943. The completion of the North Block in 1943 finalised the removal of Canberra Hospital from its Balmain Crescent site.

Bennett House's first stage, known originally as the Nurses' Quarters, was completed in August 1942. New wings were added in 1948 and 1956. The former H Block (Initial Isolation Ward) was designed by Leighton Irwin, in conjunction with the first major works on the relocated hospital site. H Block was constructed on the site of the original Acton Homestead. It was opened by Lord Gowrie in 1943. The former Medical Superintendent's Residence was also designed by Leighton Irwin as part of the new hospital, and was completed in 1943. It housed the medical superintendent until it closed in the 1996.

The former Isolation Block (Initial TB Ward) was opened in 1947. It was constructed on the site originally occupied by outbuildings of Acton Homestead. It housed both tuberculosis (TB) and infectious disease patients, and was separate from the hospital’s other wards. Treatment of TB particularly relied on provision of well-ventilated, sunny wards, which influenced the design of this particular building. TB wards were often called "chalets" and this name also applied to the Acton ward. The main external change was the construction of a chapel over the former entry steps and alterations to the west end.

In 1946, Howard Florey administered 25,000 Oxford units of penicillin to a five-month-old infant at the hospital with pneumonia, who became one of the youngest children treated with the new drug. In 1948, more than 700 babies were delivered at the hospital.

=== Growth years 1948–1980s ===
There was a poliomyelitis epidemic in Canberra in 1950–1951. Many of the cases were from the suburbs of Turner and O'Connor and a pre-school and mothercraft centre were closed. A nurse at the isolation ward contracted the disease and died. In 1954, a memorial fountain was built close to the original site of Acton Homestead at the instigation of the Deputy Matron Miss Sylvia Curley, using some stones saved from the demolition of the homestead. The fountain was constructed by the Department of the Interior at a cost of £350.

Between 1954 and 1961, the population of Canberra almost doubled. Plans to construct new main buildings were approved by the hospital board in December 1959. In 1960, a contract was let for additions to the Canberra Community Hospital. The new building required the removal of the Commonwealth Bank and Acton Post Office buildings. The original main building of the hospital was extended and the administrative offices (which were demolished in 1973) were refurbished.

Associated with the 1960s redevelopment was the construction of the personnel services unit, the staff dining hall, a courtyard/library, the mortuary, a boiler house and a laundry. Sylvia Curley House, a new nurses' residence, was opened by Dame Pattie Menzies on 17 April 1964. The surrounds of Sylvia Curley House were designed by Otto Ruzicka, the first landscape architect employed by City Parks in the early 1960s.

During the period between 1959 and 1989, Royal Canberra Hospital received high praise as a nursing, teaching and community institution. Memorials in the hospital to a considerable number of outstanding people and events exist, including the Mona Tait and May Hayman plaque, the stained glass window erected in memory of Sister Dorothy Bryan, a plaque and operating rooms in the Peter Blaxland Suite, the Edith McHugh Ward in Obstetrics, the Marcus de Laune Faunce Auditorium and the Carmel Smith Memorial. In 1965 Malcolm Whyte became the foundation professor and head of the hospital's Department of Clinical Science. Notable members of the staff included the renal physician Brian Hurley, the obstetricians Jim McCracken, Moya Blackall, Jeff Harrington (who was killed in a plane crash when returning to Canberra in 1961), Graham Hart and John Hehir, the emergency physician and intensivist Jim Keaney, the thoracic physician Stephen Nogrady, the cardiologist Howard Peak and the surgeons James, Wearne, Olver, Blaxland, Connors, Andrea, Shanahan, Vance, Leitch, Robson and Hughes. Others were Mr Sid Anderson, Hospital Secretary 1933–1957, Dr Albert Lane, Medical Superintendent 1951–1964 (who had a private toilet with an external sign: "Danger, 10,000 volts-do not enter") and Mrs Enid Barnes, Pharmacist 1952–1984. Margaret Sheldon worked as a resident medical officer and then as a senior radiologist at the hospital between 1959 and 1973.

Longstanding members of the hospital board of management during this period included Mr Allan Fraser MP, member for the federal seat of Eden-Monaro and Hospital Board member 1947–1975 (26 years 11 months of total service), Mr J. H. Pead businessman and Advisory Councillor (1955–1975 – 17 years 2 months), Mr C. A. Donnelly (1949–1961 – 11 years 10 months), Dr F. B. Uther (1956–1967 – 11 years 6 months), Dr T. H. J. Harrison (1957–1967 – 10 years 2 months), Mr J. Brophy (1944–1957 – 9 years 2 months), Mrs R. Inall (1959–1967 – 8 years 3 months) and Mr R. H. Webster (1967–1975 – 7 years 8 months).

One-time of the Australian Greens Dr Bob Brown was a resident at the Royal Canberra Hospital and has stated that one of his early and formative experiences in civil disobedience was watching how the senior medical staff at RCH consistently found healthy young men who didn't wish to fight, completely unfit on medical grounds for conscription into the Australian Army for the Vietnam War. Dr Bob Brown was also the founding president of the RASCALS (Residents And Sisters Club for Activities in Leisuretime) lodge, which was established at Jindabyne to provide doctors and nurses from RCH with accommodation near the snowfields.

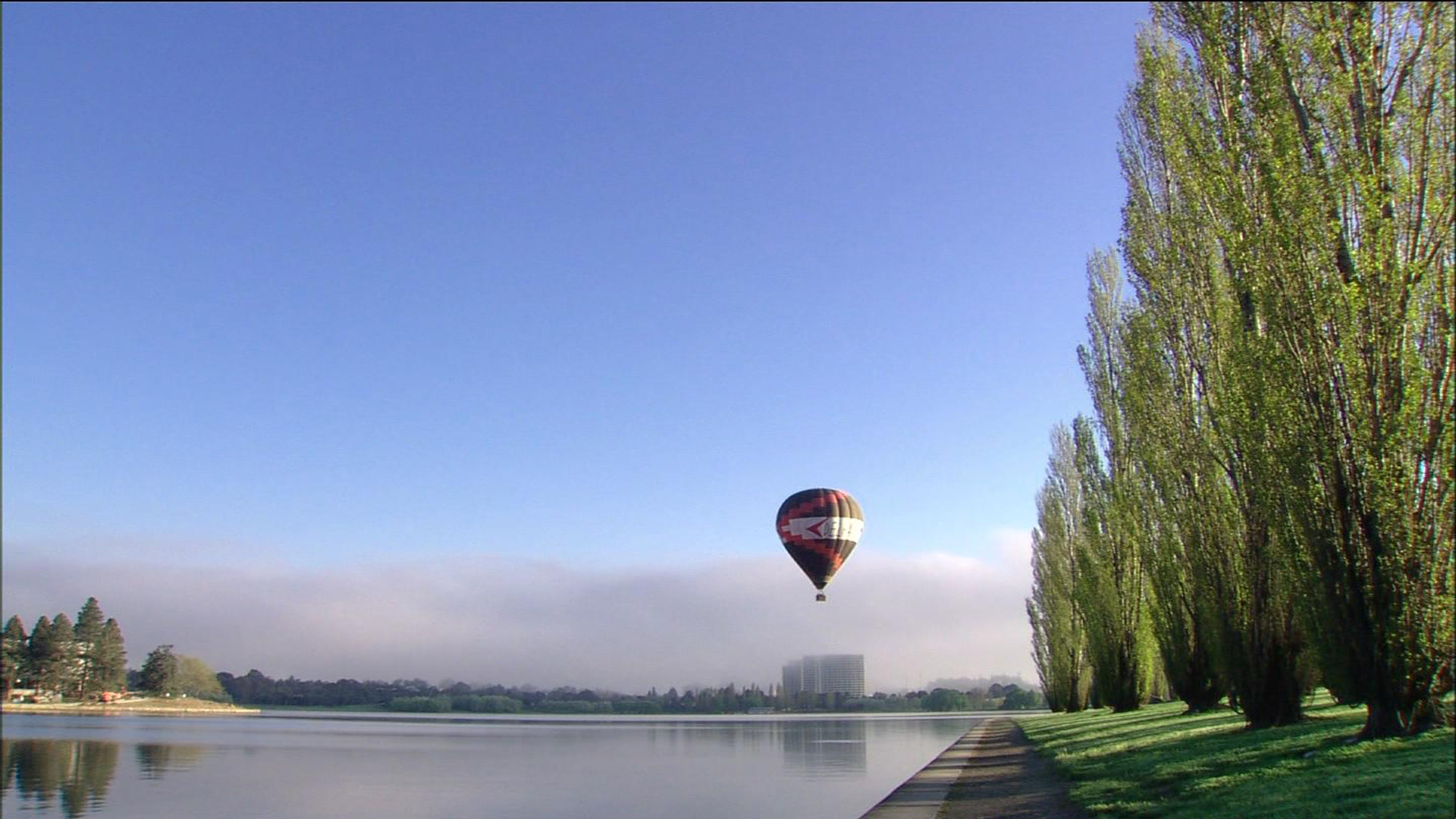
Lake Burley Griffin. Royal Canberra Hospital site to left.

The rowing club at RCH was coordinated by Ken Hopkinson, who managed to get RMOs and registrars on the water at 6 am three mornings a week and organised related fundraising. The view of Lake Burley Griffin, its tree-clad shores and islands on three sides, is cited as creating a sense of tranquillity and goodwill in the atmosphere at RCH.

Walter Burley Griffin planned that Canberra's hospital be located near its university. This plan took shape with the establishment of the Australian National University and John Curtin School of Medical Research (1947). Its links with the RCH became more evident when the Department of Clinical Science was established in 1966 as part of the school but was located at the hospital. A mosaic entitled Metropolis on the wall at the entrance to the tower block commemorated the opening. In the years 1966–1968 Annual Reports list 425 contributions to medical and scientific literature, more than half the publications resulting from work carried out in RCH. Prof. Malcolm Whyte records that: "These can be roughly categorised as 98 relating to the metabolism of lipids and carbohydrates and associated diseases, 92 to intestinal diseases and related inflammatory and immunological processes...65 to thrombosis production and dissolution and platelet functions, 62 to malignant hyperpyrexia...More than half of the publications resulted from work carried out in the hospital on the peninsula." Prof. Whyte records that Michael Denborough's research unit on malignant hyperpyrexia remained on the 5th floor of the main block of RCH "until its dying days."

=== Moves toward closure ===
In 1989 the Steering Committee for Public Hospitals Development recommended that Woden Valley Hospital (now called The Canberra Hospital or TCH for short) be developed as the principal hospital for the ACT. The opening of Calvary Hospital in 1979 precipitated bed closures and staff reductions at RCH. Public concern at the possible closure of RCH resulted in the formation of a group called the ARCH Committee (Augment RCH). It included members of the Residents Rally – medical workers and representatives from the community. In 1989 the Government decided to close RCH and redevelop the site with health facilities. ARCH presented petitions and letters to the ACT Legislative Assembly and 60,000 petitions protested the closure of RCH, which occurred on 27 November 1991.

Consultant physician Marcus de Laune Faunce wrote about the RCH closure: "Towards the end of 1990 many Canberra citizens were either bewildered, angered or saddened as they realised that the Royal Canberra Hospital on Acton Peninsula was soon to be closed...Its staffing structure and organisation were thought to have been planned in advance in step with population needs and the hospital was firmly and warmly placed in the memories and affections of many people...Its beautiful, central position on the lake had been marked by Walter Burley Griffin on his original plan. After its formative years, it served Canberra for more than three decades as a first-class hospital staffed by hard-working, skilled and caring health workers. With its magnificent site and proximity to the Australian National University [see Australian National University Medical School] it had enormous potential as a future teaching hospital reflecting the best of Australian medical services."

=== Implosion and repurposed land ===
After the hospital closed, the public were encouraged by the ACT Government to watch the controlled demolition of the hospital on 13 July 1997. That day, a girl named Katie Bender was killed by flying debris, along with nine other injuries, leading to criticism of the ACT Government and a memorial on the lake foreshore.

Shortly after the announcement that a medical school would be established at the adjacent Australian National University, staff at the medical school made a proposal to the National Capital Authority that the old Royal Canberra Hospital hospice and isolation block facilities on Acton Peninsula (which had been heritage listed for a health use) should be leased to the ANU Medical School for teaching and clinical purposes.

== The "pregnant" pine ==
A landmark within the grounds of the hospital on Acton Peninsula was the appropriately bulging pine tree in front of the main entry to the Obstetric Unit. This tree was formerly located by Acton Homestead built about 1826 by JJ Moore and remained after the house was demolished to build the hospital in 1940. Each December during the operation of Royal Canberra Hospital it became a decorated Christmas Tree.

== Bibliography ==
- Ide, Arthur Frederick (1994). Royal Canberra Hospital: an account of its origins and development, the first forty years, 1914 to 1954. Canberra: Arthur Ide. ISBN 0-646-18890-9.
- Proust, A. J., ed. (1994). History of Medicine in Canberra and Queanbeyan and Their Hospitals. Gundaroo: Brolga Press. ISBN 1-875495-12-6.
