= List of ordinances of the Australian Capital Territory from 1970 =

This is a list of ordinances enacted by the Governor-General of Australia for the Australian Capital Territory for the year 1970.

== 1970 ==
Short title, or popular name	Citation	Notified
Long title
Dentists Registration Ordinance 1970 or the Dentists Registration Act 1970 (repealed)	No. 1 of 1970	29 January 1970
An Ordinance to amend the Dentists Registration Ordinance 1931-1967. (Note: Dentists Registration Ordinance 1931 (No. 8)) (Repealed by Statute Law Amendment Act 2000 (No. 80))
Amendments Incorporation (Repeal of State Law) Ordinance 1970 (repealed)	No. 2 of 1970	5 February 1970
An Ordinance to Terminate the Operation in the Territory of the Amendments Incorporation Act, 1906 (Note: Amendments Incorporation Act 1906 (No. 6 (NSW))) of the State of New South Wales. (Repealed by Ordinances Revision Ordinance 1977 (No. 65))
Printing and Newspapers Ordinance 1970 or the Printing and Newspapers Act 1970 (repealed)	No. 3 of 1970	26 February 1970
An Ordinance to amend the Printing and Newspapers Ordinance 1961-1966. (Note: Printing and Newspapers Ordinance 1961 (No. 16)) (Repealed by Law Reform (Miscellaneous Provisions) Act 1999 (No. 66))
Racecourses Ordinance 1970 or the Racecourses Act 1970 (repealed)	No. 4 of 1970	26 February 1970
An Ordinance to amend the Racecourses Ordinance 1935-1966. (Note: Racecourses Ordinance 1935 (No. 19)) (Repealed by Racing Act 1999 (No. 1))
Land Rent and Rates (Deferment) Ordinance 1970 or the Land Rent and Rates (Deferment) Act 1970 or the Rates and Land Rent (Relief) Act 1970 (repealed)	No. 5 of 1970	26 February 1970
An Ordinance to provide for the Deferment of Payment of Land Rent and Rates. (Repealed by Rates Act 2004 (A2004-3))
Real Property Ordinance 1970 or the Real Property Act 1970 (repealed)	No. 6 of 1970	26 February 1970
An Ordinance to amend the Real Property Ordinance 1925-1969. (Note: Real Property Ordinance 1925 (No. 1)) (Repealed by Statute Law Amendment Act 2000 (No. 80))
Surveyors Ordinance 1970 or the Surveyors Act 1970 (repealed)	No. 7 of 1970	5 March 1970
An Ordinance to amend the Surveyors Ordinance 1967. (Note: Surveyors Ordinance 1967 (No. 34)) (Repealed by Statute Law Amendment Act 2000 (No. 80))
Agents Ordinance 1970 or the Agents Act 1970 (repealed)	No. 8 of 1970	5 March 1970
An Ordinance to amend the Agents Ordinance 1968. (Note: Agents Ordinance 1968 (No. 26)) (Repealed by Statute Law Amendment Act 2000 (No. 80))
Architects Ordinance 1970 or the Architects Act 1970 (repealed)	No. 9 of 1970	5 March 1970
An Ordinance to amend the Architects Ordinance 1959-1967. (Note: Architects Ordinance 1959 (No. 3)) (Repealed by Statute Law Amendment Act 2000 (No. 80))
Building Ordinance 1970 (repealed)	No. 10 of 1970	5 March 1970
An Ordinance to amend the Building Ordinance 1964-1969. (Note: Building Ordinance 1964 (No. 19)) (Repealed by Building Ordinance 1972 (No. 26))
Buildings (Design and Siting) Ordinance 1970 or the Buildings (Design and Siting) Act 1970 (repealed)	No. 11 of 1970	5 March 1970
An Ordinance to amend the Buildings (Design and Siting) Ordinance 1964-1969. (Note: Buildings (Design and Siting) Ordinance 1964 (No. 20)) (Repealed by Land (Planning and Environment) (Amendment) Act (No. 3) 1996 (No. 85))
Enquiry Ordinance 1970 or the Enquiry Act 1970 (repealed)	No. 12 of 1970	5 March 1970
An Ordinance to amend the Enquiry Ordinance 1938-1967. (Note: Enquiry Ordinance 1938 (No. 10)) (Repealed by Statute Law Revision (Miscellaneous Provisions) Act 1993 (No. 1))
Land Valuation Ordinance 1970 or the Land Valuation Act 1970 (repealed)	No. 13 of 1970	5 March 1970
An Ordinance to amend the Land Valuation Ordinance 1936-1967. (Note: Land Valuation Ordinance 1936 (No. 30)) (Repealed by Land (Planning and Environment) (Consequential Provisions) Act 1991 (No. 118))
Blood Transfusions (Infants) Ordinance 1970 (repealed)	No. 14 of 1970	5 March 1970
An Ordinance relating to the Administration of Blood Transfusions to Infants. (Repealed by Transplantation and Anatomy Ordinance 1978 (No. 44))
Court of Petty Sessions Ordinance 1970 or the Court of Petty Sessions Act 1970 (repealed)	No. 15 of 1970	19 March 1970
An Ordinance to amend the Court of Petty Sessions Ordinance 1930-1969. (Note: Court of Petty Sessions Ordinance (No. 2) 1930 (No. 31)) (Repealed by Statute Law Amendment Act 2000 (No. 80))
Weights and Measures (Packaged Goods) Ordinance 1970 or the Weights and Measures (Packaged Goods) Act 1970 (repealed)	No. 16 of 1970	17 April 1970
An Ordinance to regulate the Packing and Sale of certain articles and the Marking of Packages in which certain articles are sold. (Repealed by Trade Measurement Act 1991 (No. 56))
Police Ordinance 1970 or the Police Act 1970 (repealed)	No. 17 of 1970	1 June 1970
An Ordinance to amend the Police Ordinance 1927-1967, (Note: Police Ordinance 1927 (No. 19)) and to validate appointments made to the Police Force. (Repealed by Crimes (Amendment) Act (No. 2) 1994 (No. 75))
Agents Ordinance (No. 2) 1970 or the Agents Act (No. 2) 1970 (repealed)	No. 18 of 1970	25 June 1970
An Ordinance to amend the Agents Ordinance 1968, as amended by the Agents Ordinance 1970. (Note: Agents Ordinance 1970 (No. 8)) (Repealed by Statute Law Amendment Act 2000 (No. 80))
Architects Ordinance (No. 2) 1970 or the Architects Act (No. 2) 1970 (repealed)	No. 19 of 1970	25 June 1970
An Ordinance to amend the Architects Ordinance 1959-1967, as amended by the Architects Ordinance 1970. (Note: Architects Ordinance 1970 (No. 9)) (Repealed by Statute Law Amendment Act 2000 (No. 80))
Building Ordinance (No. 2) 1970 (repealed)	No. 20 of 1970	25 June 1970
An Ordinance to amend the Building Ordinance 1964-1969, as amended by the Building Ordinance 1970. (Note: Building Ordinance 1970 (No. 10)) (Repealed by Building Ordinance 1972 (No. 26))
Buildings (Design and Siting) Ordinance (No. 2) 1970 or the Buildings (Design and Siting) Act (No. 2) 1970 (repealed)	No. 21 of 1970	25 June 1970
An Ordinance to amend the Buildings (Design and Siting) Ordinance 1964-1969, as amended by the Buildings (Design and Siting) Ordinance 1970. (Note: Buildings (Design and Siting) Ordinance 1970 (No. 11)) (Repealed by Land (Planning and Environment) (Amendment) Act (No. 3) 1996 (No. 85))
Enquiry Ordinance (No. 2) 1970 or the Enquiry Act (No. 2) 1970 (repealed)	No. 22 of 1970	25 June 1970
An Ordinance to amend the Enquiry Ordinance 1938-1967, as amended by the Enquiry Ordinance 1970. (Note: Enquiry Ordinance 1970 (No. 12)) (Repealed by Statute Law Revision (Miscellaneous Provisions) Act 1993 (No. 1))
Land Valuation Ordinance (No. 2) 1970 or the Land Valuation Act (No. 2) 1970 (repealed)	No. 23 of 1970	25 June 1970
An Ordinance to amend the Land Valuation Ordinance 1936-1967, as amended by the Land Valuation Ordinance 1970. (Note: Land Valuation Ordinance 1970 (No. 13)) (Repealed by Land (Planning and Environment) (Consequential Provisions) Act 1991 (No. 118))
Surveyors Ordinance (No. 2) 1970 or the Surveyors Act (No. 2) 1970 (repealed)	No. 24 of 1970	25 June 1970
An Ordinance to amend the Surveyors Ordinance 1967, as amended by the Surveyors Ordinance 1970. (Note: Surveyors Ordinance 1970 (No. 7)) (Repealed by Statute Law Amendment Act 2000 (No. 80))
Administration and Probate Ordinance 1970 or the Administration and Probate Act 1970 (repealed)	No. 25 of 1970	2 July 1970
An Ordinance to amend the Administration and Probate Ordinance 1929-1969. (Note: Administration and Probate Ordinance 1929 (No. 18)) (Repealed by Statute Law Amendment Act 2000 (No. 80))
Workmen's Compensation Ordinance 1970 or the Workmen's Compensation Act 1970 (repealed)	No. 26 of 1970	9 July 1970
An Ordinance to amend the Workmen's Compensation Ordinance 1951-1969. (Note: Workmen's Compensation Ordinance 1951 (No. 2)) (Repealed by Statute Law Amendment Act 2000 (No. 80))
Motor Traffic Ordinance 1970 or the Motor Traffic Act 1970 (repealed)	No. 27 of 1970	13 August 1970
An Ordinance to amend the Motor Traffic Ordinance 1936-1969. (Note: Motor Traffic Ordinance 1936 (No. 45)) (Repealed by Road Transport Legislation Amendment Act 1999 (No. 79))
Legal Practitioners Ordinance 1970 (repealed)	No. 28 of 1970	13 August 1970
An Ordinance relating to Legal Practitioners. (Repealed by Legal Practitioners Ordinance (No. 2) 1970 (No. 43))
Companies (Life Insurance Holding Companies) Ordinance 1970 (repealed)	No. 29 of 1970	13 August 1970
An Ordinance to amend the Companies (Life Insurance Holding Companies) Ordinance 1968. (Note: Companies (Life Insurance Holding Companies) Ordinance 1968 (No. 23)) (Repealed by Commonwealth Functions (Statutes Review) Act 1981 (No. 74 (Cth)))
Land Rent (Interim Provisions) Ordinance 1970 (repealed)	No. 30 of 1970	10 September 1970
An Ordinance to make provision in relation to the amount of rent that is to be payable in advance in respect of certain leases granted after the commencement of this Ordinance. (Repealed by Ordinances Revision Ordinance 1978 (No. 46))
Unit Titles Ordinance 1970 or the Unit Titles Act 1970 (repealed)	No. 31 of 1970	11 September 1970
An Ordinance relating to the Sub-division of Land into Units, Unit Subsidiaries and Common Property. (Repealed by Unit Titles Act 2001 (No. 16))
Real Property (Unit Titles) Ordinance 1970 or the Real Property (Unit Titles) Act 1970 or the Land Titles (Unit Titles) Act 1970	No. 32 of 1970	11 September 1970
An Ordinance to provide for the Registration of Unit Titles and for other purposes.
Gun Licence Ordinance 1970 or the Gun Licence Act 1970 (repealed)	No. 33 of 1970	22 October 1970
An Ordinance to amend the Gun Licence Ordinance 1937-1966. (Note: Gun Licence Ordinance 1937 (No. 6)) (Repealed by Weapons Act 1991 (No. 8))
Medical Practitioners Registration Ordinance 1970 or the Medical Practitioners Registration Act 1970 (repealed)	No. 34 of 1970	27 October 1970
An Ordinance to amend the Medical Practitioners Registration Ordinance 1930-1969. (Note: Medical Practitioners Registration Ordinance 1930 (No. 13)) (Repealed by Statute Law Amendment Act 2000 (No. 80))
Nurses Registration Ordinance 1970 (repealed)	No. 35 of 1970	22 October 1970
An Ordinance to amend the Nurses Registration Ordinance 1933-1967. (Note: Nurses Registration Ordinance 1933 (No. 1)) (Repealed by Nurses Ordinance 1988 (No. 61))
Optometrists Ordinance 1970 or the Optometrists Act 1970 (repealed)	No. 36 of 1970	22 October 1970
An Ordinance to amend the Optometrists Ordinance 1956-1967. (Note: Optometrists Ordinance 1956 (No. 4)) (Repealed by Statute Law Amendment Act 2000 (No. 80))
Pharmacy Ordinance 1970 or the Pharmacy Act 1970 (repealed)	No. 37 of 1970	22 October 1970
An Ordinance to amend the Pharmacy Ordinance 1931-1967. (Note: Pharmacy Ordinance 1931 (No. 10)) (Repealed by Statute Law Amendment Act 2000 (No. 80))
Dentists Registration Ordinance (No. 2) 1970 or the Dentists Registration Act (No. 2) 1970 (repealed)	No. 38 of 1970	27 October 1970
An Ordinance to amend the Dentists Registration Ordinance 1931-1967, as amended by the Dentists Registration Ordinance 1970. (Note: Dentists Registration Ordinance 1970 (No. 1)) (Repealed by Statute Law Amendment Act 2000 (No. 80))
Veterinary Surgeons Registration Ordinance 1970 or the Veterinary Surgeons Registration Act 1970 (repealed)	No. 39 of 1970	22 October 1970
An Ordinance to amend the Veterinary Surgeons Registration Ordinance 1965-1967. (Note: Veterinary Surgeons Registration Ordinance 1965 (No. 3)) (Repealed by Statute Law Amendment Act 2000 (No. 80))
Crimes Ordinance 1970 or the Crimes Act 1970 (repealed)	No. 40 of 1970	22 October 1970
An Ordinance relating to Crimes. (Repealed by Statute Law Amendment Act 2000 (No. 80))
Police Offences Ordinance 1970 or the Police Offences Act 1970 (repealed)	No. 41 of 1970	22 October 1970
An Ordinance to amend the Police Offences Ordinance 1930-1967. (Note: Police Offences Ordinance 1930 (No. 9)) (Repealed by Law Reform (Abolitions and Repeals) Act 1996 (No. 1))
Commonwealth Motor Omnibus Services Ordinance 1970 or the Commonwealth Motor Omnibus Services Act 1970 (repealed)	No. 42 of 1970	29 October 1970
An Ordinance to amend the Commonwealth Motor Omnibus Services Ordinance 1955-1966. (Note: Commonwealth Motor Omnibus Services Ordinance 1955 (No. 12)) (Repealed by Road Transport Legislation Amendment Act 2001 (No. 27))
Legal Practitioners Ordinance (No. 2) 1970 or the Legal Practitioners Ordinance 1970 or the Legal Practitioners Act 1970 (repealed)	No. 43 of 1970	29 October 1970
An Ordinance relating to Legal Practitioners. (Repealed by Legal Profession Act 2006 (A2006-25))
Land Rent (Validation and Re-appraisement) Ordinance 1970 (repealed)	No. 44 of 1970	16 December 1970
An Ordinance relating to the Re-appraisement of Unimproved Values of certain Parcels of Land and to Land Rent by reference to that Re-appraisement. (Repealed by Self-Government (Consequential Amendments) Ordinance 1989 (No. 38))
City Area Leases Ordinance 1970 or the City Area Leases Act 1970 (repealed)	No. 45 of 1970	17 December 1970
An Ordinance to amend the City Area Leases Ordinance 1936-1969. (Note: City Area Leases Ordinance 1936 (No. 31)) (Repealed by Land (Planning and Environment) (Consequential Provisions) Act 1991 (No. 118))
Leases (Special Purposes) Ordinance 1970 or the Leases (Special Purposes) Act 1970 (repealed)	No. 46 of 1970	17 December 1970
An Ordinance to amend the Leases (Special Purposes) Ordinance 1925-1943. (Note: Leases (Special Purposes) Ordinance 1925 (No. 11)) (Repealed by Land (Planning and Environment) (Consequential Provisions) Act 1991 (No. 118))
Rates Ordinance 1970 or the Rates Act 1970 (repealed)	No. 47 of 1970	17 December 1970
An Ordinance to amend the Rates Ordinance 1926-1967. (Note: Rates Ordinance 1926 (No. 6)) (Repealed by Statute Law Amendment Act 2000 (No. 80))
Companies (Uranium Mining Companies) Ordinance 1970 (repealed)	No. 48 of 1970	17 December 1970
An Ordinance to restrict the Number and Value of Foreign Shares that may be held in Specified Companies incorporated in the Territory and to require the Disclosure of Substantial Shareholdings in those Companies. (Repealed by Companies (Uranium Mining Companies) (Repeal) Ordinance 1979 (No. 21))
Water Rates Ordinance 1970 or the Water Rates Act 1970 (repealed)	No. 49 of 1970	30 December 1970
An Ordinance to amend the Water Rates Ordinance 1959-1969. (Note: Water Rates Ordinance 1959 (No. 19)) (Repealed by Statute Law Amendment Act 2000 (No. 80))
Sewerage Rates Ordinance 1970 or the Sewerage Rates Act 1970 (repealed)	No. 50 of 1970	30 December 1970
An Ordinance to amend the Sewerage Rates Ordinance 1968-1969. (Note: Sewerage Rates Ordinance 1968 (No. 30)) (Repealed by Statute Law Amendment Act 2000 (No. 80))
Legal Practitioners Ordinance (No. 3) 1970 or the Legal Practitioners Act (No. 3) 1970 (repealed)	No. 51 of 1970	30 December 1970
An Ordinance to amend the Legal Practitioners Ordinance (No. 2) 1970. (Note: Legal Practitioners Ordinance (No. 2) 1970 (No. 43)) (Repealed by Statute Law Amendment Act 2000 (No. 80))

== Sources ==
- "legislation.act.gov.au".

[[]]
