= Les Carlyon =

Australian writer and newspaper editor (1942–2019)

Les Carlyon AC
- Born: Leslie Allen Carlyon; 10 June 1942; Elmore, Victoria, Australia
- Died: 5 March 2019 (aged 76)
- Education: Melbourne High School; University of Melbourne
- Occupations: Historian, journalist, newspaper editor
- Writing career
- Genre: Military history
- Subject: World War I
- Notable works: Gallipoli (2001); The Great War (2006)
- Notable awards: Graham Perkin Award (1993)

Leslie Allen Carlyon AC (10 June 1942 – 4 March 2019) was an Australian writer and newspaper editor.

== Early life ==
Carlyon began his career in journalism with The Herald and Weekly Times as a cadet on the Sun News-Pictorial (now the Herald Sun) in 1960. In 1963, he moved to The Age working successively as leader writer, finance editor, news editor, assistant editor and, in 1975 aged 33, editor, following the sudden death of the previous editor, Graham Perkin. Carlyon had to resign for health reasons in 1976 after just one year in the position.

From 1977 to 1982, he was a visiting lecturer in journalism at RMIT University, Melbourne. During this time, he continued writing for newspapers across Australia with a particular focus on horse racing.

In 1984, Carlyon returned to an executive role in journalism with his first employer, the Herald and Weekly Times, where he was promoted to editor-in-chief. After resigning in 1986, Carlyon again continued as a freelance writer and columnist during the 1990s, contributing to such publications as the Sydney Morning Herald, Western Australia's The Sunday Times and The Bulletin.

Carlyon twice won the Walkley Award for journalism (1971 and 2004). In 1993, he won the Graham Perkin Australian Journalist of the Year Award.

== Books ==
In addition to his career as a journalist, Carlyon was also an accomplished author writing mainly on sport and Australian military history. His books include:

- Carlyon, Les (1996). True Grit: Tales from a Decade on the Turf. Mandarin. ISBN 9781863306065.
- Carlyon, Les (1998). Heroes in our eyes. Information Australia. ISBN 9781863502467.
- Carlyon, Les (2001). Gallipoli. Macmillan Australia. ISBN 9781743534229.
- Carlyon, Les (2006). The Great War. Picador Australia. ISBN 9780330424967.
- Carlyon, Les (2011). The Master: A personal portrait of Bart Cummings. Macmillan Australia. ISBN 9781742628837.
- Carlyon, Les (2021). Les Carlyon: A Life in Words. Allen and Unwin Australia. ISBN 9781760879723.

Gallipoli, a popular history of the Allied Gallipoli campaign in the Dardanelles during the First World War (which remains a key event in the Australian and New Zealand national consciousnesses), was published in 2001, and met with critical and commercial success in Australia, New Zealand and England. The book was the basis for the Australian 2015 TV miniseries Gallipoli, released in the year of the 100th anniversary of the campaign.

The Great War is the story of Australian forces on the Western Front in France and Belgium also during World War I.

Les Carlyon: A Life in Words, published posthumously, is a collection of Carlyon's articles from across his career, selected by his family and with a foreword by his son, Patrick Carlyon.

== Awards ==
In the 2014 Queen's Birthday Honours List, Carlyon was invested as a Companion of the Order of Australia (AC), for "eminent service to literature through the promotion of the national identity as an author, editor and journalist, to the understanding and appreciation of Australia's war history, and to the horseracing industry".

He was admitted to the Australian Media Hall of Fame.

He served as a Member of the Council of the Australian War Memorial from May 2006 until his death (he was replaced by Tony Abbott). In April 2020, the Australian War Memorial announced the inaugural Les Carlyon Literary Prize in his memory.

=== Awards ===
- Walkley Award for magazine feature writing 1971
- Graham Perkin Australian Journalist of the Year Award 1993
- Walkley Award for journalism leadership 2004
- Melbourne Press Club Quill Award for Lifetime Achievement 2004
- Prime Minister's Prize for History 2007 (for The Great War)
- Companion of the Order of Australia (AC) 2014

== Death ==
Carlyon's death, aged 76, on 4 March 2019 was widely reported.

In 2020, the Les Carlyon biennial literary award for military history was established by the Australian War Memorial council.

Media offices
| Preceded by Graham Perkin | Editor of The Age; 1975–1976 | Succeeded by Greg Taylor |
