= Robert Gottliebsen =

Australian journalist

Robert Norman Gottliebsen AM (born 4 February 1941) is a columnist for Business Spectator and an economics writer at The Australian. He was the original columnist "Chanticleer" for the Australian Financial Review and founder of Business Review Weekly magazine, heading the magazine for the next 19 years. He also co-founded the investor advice newsletter and website Eureka Report in 2005, and writes a weekly column for it.

Gottliebsen was educated at Essendon Grammar School and the University of Melbourne. He won a Walkley award in 1976, and was Graham Perkin Australian Journalist of the Year in 1976. He was made a Member of the Order of Australia in the 2018 Queen's Birthday Honours, for "significant service to the print media as a journalist, editor and business analyst, and to education through school governance roles."

Gottliebsen is a member of Essendon Presbyterian Church and has served as its treasurer.
