= Audrey Fagan =

Australian police chief

Audrey Fagan APM

Chief police officer of ACT Policing
- In office 4 July 2005 – 20 April 2007
- Preceded by: John Davies
- Succeeded by: Michael Phelan

Personal details
- Born: 23 June 1962 Dublin, Ireland
- Died: 20 April 2007 (aged 44) Hayman Island, Queensland, Australia
- Cause of death: Suicide by hanging
- Profession: Assistant Police commissioner

Audrey Ann Fagan APM (23 June 1962 – 20 April 2007) was an Australian police officer. Between 2005 and 2007, she held the rank of Assistant Commissioner and served as the chief police officer of Australian Capital Territory (ACT) Policing, which includes community policing responsibilities for Canberra and other parts of the ACT. She was awarded the Australian Police Medal in 2004 . She died in office, having taken her own life by hanging herself while on a holiday.

== Early years and background ==
Fagan was born in Ireland in 1962. Fagan and her parents, Arthur and Jenny, emigrated to South Australia in 1971, when Fagan was nine. She joined the Australian Federal Police (AFP) in 1981, at the age of 18.

== Death ==
On the 20th of April 2007, Fagan died by suicide while holidaying on Queensland's Hayman Island. She was found hanged. The Queensland Police investigated her death and concluded there were no suspicious circumstances.

Assistant Commissioner Fagan was under scrutiny over the treatment of detainees in Canberra police cells after the ACT Ombudsman revealed details in February of a joint review to examine procedures in Canberra's watch house. It followed complaints made to the Ombudsman relating to the treatment of intoxicated detainees and those with a disability, failure to provide timely medical treatment and theft of property.

Two weeks before her death, Jack Waterford, the editor-at-large of The Canberra Times, wrote an editorial highly critical of the management of the AFP at that time, in which he opined that the ACT was "receiving a second-rate service at Rolls-Royce cost" and suggested that ACT Policing "was a complacent and unaccountable organisation of no great competence which is wide open to and may have already been percolated by corruption", allegations which were picked up by other ACT media outlets, including the ABC. AFP Commissioner Mick Keelty confirmed that Assistant Commissioner Fagan had felt under pressure as a result of the latest media attention and had sought professional support.

Fagan is survived by her second husband Chris Rowell, daughter Clair from her previous marriage to Andrew Phillips, and two step-children, Glen Charles Rowell and Carly.

A funeral with full police honours was held at St Christopher's Cathedral, Manuka on the 27th of April 2007, after which Fagan was interred at a private family ceremony.

Police appointments
Preceded by John Davies	Chief police officer of ACT Policing; 2005–2007	Succeeded by Michael Phelan
