= Melbourne Business School =

Graduate school of the University of Melbourne

Coordinates: 37°48′5″S 144°57′40″E

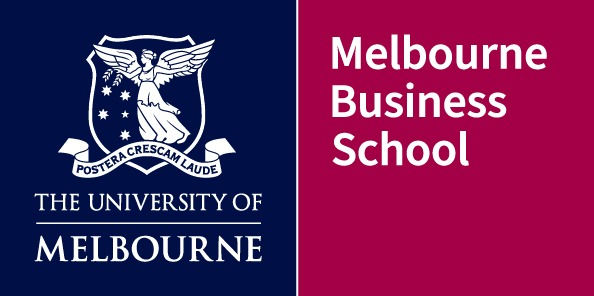
- Motto: "Made. Not Born."
- Type: Business school
- Established: 1955
- Affiliations: University of Melbourne
- Dean: Professor Jenny George
- Faculty: 80+
- Students: 800+
- Location: 200 Leicester Street, Carlton, Victoria 3053, Australia, Melbourne, Victoria, 3053, Australia
- Campus: Urban
- Colors: Maroon Traditional Heritage Blue Opal
- Website: www.mbs.edu

Melbourne Business School (MBS) is the graduate business school of the University of Melbourne, located in Victoria, Australia. The School offers a range of programs, including an MBA, specialist Masters programs, a doctoral program, and various executive education programs. The MBS Head Office and main campus are in the Melbourne suburb of Carlton, walking distance from Melbourne's Central Business District, in a complex designed by Daryl Jackson.

MBS has an additional office in Pitt Street, Sydney, and a program enquiries office in Kuala Lumpur, Malaysia.

== History ==
MBS began teaching in 1955 when the University of Melbourne offered Australia's first residential executive education program in the summer of that year. Its first Master of Business Administration (MBA) degree was awarded in 1965, which was also the first MBA degree awarded in Australia.

During the 1980s, MBS was awarded the status of a National Management School by the Australian Government and the Graduate School of Management was established within the University of Melbourne.

In 1989, it was re-organized again, this time as the Graduate School of Management Ltd: a non-profit company limited by guarantee and managed by a board of directors which includes the chairs and directors of leading Australian corporations. This organization structure has helped create a major link between the university and those who have a responsibility for management. It is currently co-owned by the University of Melbourne (45%) and Australian businesses (55%).

In 2004, Melbourne Business School Limited merged with Mt Eliza Business School, which was established in 1957, becoming the largest management education business school in Australia.

In July 2009, the school announced that it was the subject of a proposed merger with the Graduate School of Management at the University of Melbourne. However, the proposal was decided not to proceed following opposition from MBS members in September 2009.

In October 2012 the school signed a collaboration deal with University of Melbourne, sharing resources but retaining the school's independence and the authority of the board.

MBS closed and sold its Mt Eliza campus in 2016, to concentrate on expanding the Carlton campus.

== Research Centres ==
Centre for Business Analytics

The Centre for Business Analytics (CfBA) at Melbourne Business School was established in 2014 in response to growing global demand for analytics research and knowledge. The Centre also manages educational programs, collaborative workshops and the School's Master of Business Analytics program. The CfBA is headed by Professor Yalcin Akcay.

Centre for Sustainability and Business

The Centre for Sustainability and Business at Melbourne Business School was established in 2020 to support the development of sustainability in business. the Centre brings together leaders to develop the networks and comprehensive skill-sets needed to advance the practice of sustainability in business. The CSaB is headed by Professor Glen Hoetker.

Dilin Duwa Centre for Indigenous Business Leadership

The Dilin Duwa Centre is a joint centre between the University of Melbourne’s Faculty of Business and Economics and the Melbourne Business School. It runs the Murra Program and a Graduate Certificate of Indigenous Leadership. The Centre is headed by Associate Professor Michelle Evans.

== Ranking ==
Business school rankings

Global
- QS MBA: 26
- Financial Times MBA: Unranked

In the 2015 Bloomberg Businessweek global business school rankings, Melbourne Business School was ranked 1^{st} in Australia and 23^{rd} globally for its International MBA program. In the same year, Poets & Quants ranked the business school 38^{th} globally in its International MBA program.

In 2016, the business school moved up 14 places in the Bloomberg Businessweek International MBA ranking to 9^{th}globally but still remaining 1^{st} in Australia. Poets & Quants also ranked the business school, 20th globally. This marked a significant jump of 18 places from their previous rank of 38th.

In 2017, the school was named by the Financial Times as among the world’s top three business schools for marketing. The FT Global MBA ranked the school 3^{rd} in Australia and 76^{th} globally. While its Executive MBA program was ranked 1^{st} in Australia and 60^{th} globally.

In 2018, Melbourne Business School moved up 10 places in the Financial Times Global MBA ranking to 66^{th} globally, and was named the best business school in Australia for the second year running as well as one of the top 10 in the Asia-Pacific region. The Economist ranked the school’s MBA program1^{st} in Australia and 23th globally. QS World University Rankings, ranked the schools MBA program 1^{st} in Australia and 34^{th} globally and ranked the Master of Business Analytics 5^{th} globally.

In 2019, Melbourne Business School's MBA hold its place in the world's top 30 with a ranking of 28th, the highest of any Australian MBA in The Economist's Which MBA? The Financial Times, ranked the schools MBA program 1^{st} in Australia and 61^{st} globally, and it’s Executive MBA program placed 1^{st} in Australia and 58^{th} globally. The QS World University Rankings, ranked the schools Master of Business Analytics 1^{st} in Australia and 15^{th} globally.

In 2020, the Financial Times ranked the business school 1^{st} in Australia and 80^{th} globally for its MBA program, and the Executive MBA program 1^{st} in Australia and 69^{th} nationally. The Economist ranked the school 41^{st} globally for its Executive MBA program. The QS World University Rankings, ranked the schools MBA program 1^{st} in Australia and 26^{th} globally. The Master of Business Analytics program was also ranked 1^{st} in Australia and 26^{th} globally.

In 2021, the Financial Times ranked the business school’s MBA program 2^{nd} in Australia and 87^{th} globally while its Executive MBA program placed 1^{st} in Australia and 82^{nd} globally. The QS World University Rankings, ranked the business school’s MBA program 1^{st} in Australia and 26^{th} globally, the Executive MBA also ranked 1^{st} in Australia and 29^{th} globally, and the Master of Business Analytics program was ranked 1^{st} in Australia and 15^{th} globally. Melbourne Business School also received 1^{st} place in the AFR Boss MBA Ranking.

In 2022, the Financial Times ranked the business school’s MBA program 1^{st} in Australia and 97^{th} globally, and the Executive MBA program ranked 2^{nd} in Australia and 94^{th} globally. The QS World University Rankings, ranked Melbourne Business School’s MBA program 1^{st} in Australia and 26^{th} globally, Executive MBA ranked 1^{st} in Australia and 29^{th} globally, Master of Business Analytics ranked 1^{st} in Australia and 13^{th} globally.

In 2023, Melbourne Business School was ranked 1^{st} in Australia and 27^{th} globally for its MBA program by QS World University Rankings, and it’s Master of Business Analytics was ranked 1^{st} in Australia and 14^{th} globally.

In 2024, the school was ranked 1^{st} in Australia and 30^{th} globally for its MBA program by QS World University Rankings. The Financial Times also ranked the school’s Executive MBA program 1^{st} in Australia and 76^{th} globally.

In 2025, the QS World University Rankings ranked the school’s MBA program 1^{st} in Australia and 32^{nd} globally. The Financial Times also ranked the business school’s Executive MBA program 1^{st} in Australia and 84^{th} globally. The school was the only Australian university to feature in the top 100 of the Financial Times Research Insights Rankings. The school was also ranked 40^{th} globally and 1^{st} in Australia for top business schools. Melbourne Business School also received 1^{st} place in the AFR Boss Best Business School. University of Texas at Dallas also ranked Melbourne Business School 1^{st} in Australia and 80^{th} globally for top 100 business schools.

In 2026, QS World University Rankings, ranked the business school 1^{st} in Australia and 31^{st} globally, its Executive MBA program ranked 2^{nd} in Asia Pacific region and 29th globally, and its Master of Business Analytics ranked 1^{st} in Australia and 18^{th} globally. The Australian Financial Review ranked the business school 1^{st} in Australia in the AFR Boss Best Business Schools ranking, marking the second consecutive year.

== Notable alumni ==
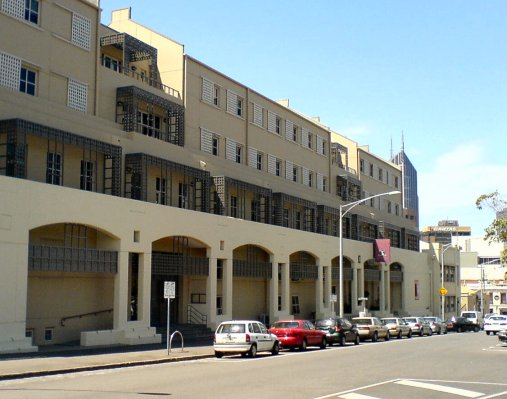
Melbourne Business School's Carlton campus.

- Adam Garone, Founder, Movember, Master of Marketing 1999
- Ahmed Fahour, former CEO, Australia Post and NAB, MBA 1993
- Andrew Bassat, Co-Founder, Seek, MBA 1994
- Bill Shorten, former Australian Federal Minister for Government Services and Minister for the National Disability Insurance Scheme, Leader of the Opposition and Leader of the Australian Labor Party (2013 - 2019), MBA 2001
- Brent Chapman, Founder, Majordomo, MBA 2003
- Brodie Grundy, Australian Football League player, Sydney Swans, MBA 2024
- Christine Kilpatrick, CEO, Royal Children's Hospital Melbourne, Senior Executive MBA, 2007
- Damien Gance, Director and Co-founder, Chemist Warehouse, MBA 2008
- Gordon Naylor, CEO of CSL, MBA 1998
- Grant McCabe, President, Geelong Football Club; Managing Director, Australia and New Zealand, Boston Consulting Group, MBA 2001
- John Elliott, former CEO of Elders IXL and Carlton & United Breweries (now Carlton & United Beverages)
- John Dahlsen, former Chairman and Co-Founder of Southern Cross Broadcasting, former Chairman of Woolworths, former Director of ANZ, and former Chairman of Melbourne Business School, Chairman of J C Dahlsen Pty Ltd,
- Katie Lahey, former CEO, Business Council of Australia, Senior Executive MBA 1988
- Margaret Jackson, former chairman Qantas, MBA 1982
- Maurice Crotti AO, Joint Chairman and Joint CEO, San Remo Pasta, MBA 1975
- Michael Phelan, Chief Policing Officer, ACT Policing (2007 - 2010); Chief Executive Officer, Australian Criminal Intelligence Commission (ACIC) (2017 - 2022), MBA 2009
- Paul Rizzo, Group Managing Director of Telstra, MBA 1969
- Rosemary Balmford, the first female judge of the Supreme Court of Victoria, MBA 1971
- Ross Oakley, former CEO, AFL
- Stuart Gregor, Co-Founder and former Trade Director, Four Pillars Gin and CEO, Lark Distilling
- Wesley Walden, Managing Partner, Australia and New Zealand, McKinsey & Company, MBA 2004

== Board of directors ==
MBS is unique among Australian business school's because of its hybrid ownership structure. The School is owned by Melbourne Business School Ltd, a non-profit organisation that is 55 per cent owned by the business community and 45 per cent owned by the University of Melbourne. The board of directors of MBS Ltd are:

- Mr Ken MacKenzie (Chairman). Appointed: 2023
- Mr Anthony Ray Burgess. Appointed: 2013
- Professor Jenny George. Appointed: 2023
- Janelle Hopkins. Appointed: 2023
- Mr Robert Johanson. Appointed 2017
- Professor Paul Kofman. Appointed: 2013
- Mr Cameron Leitch. Appointed: 2017
- Professor Geoff Martin. Appointed 2020
- Professor Duncan Maskell. Appointed 2018
- Rebecca McGrath. Appointed: 2023
- Brooke Miller. Appointed: 2023
- Ms Claire Rogers. Appointed: 2020
