= Michael Phelan (police officer) =

Australian law enforcement officer

Michael Phelan APM

Chief Executive Officer of the Australian Criminal Intelligence Commission and Director of the Australian Institute of Criminology
- Incumbent
- Assumed office 13 November 2017

Chief Police Officer of ACT Policing
- In office September 2007 – 2010
- Preceded by: Audrey Fagan
- Succeeded by: Roman Quaedvlieg

Personal details
- Spouse: Melinda Phelan
- Education: AFP College; Melbourne Business School
- Profession: Law enforcement

Michael Anthony Phelan APM, a senior Australian law enforcement officer, is the chief executive officer of the Australian Criminal Intelligence Commission and director of the Australian Institute of Criminology since November 2017.

== Career ==
With a family history of policing in the former Commonwealth Police Force (now the AFP), with Victoria Police, and with Royal Marechaussee in The Netherlands, Phelan studied initially at the Australian Federal Police College and then commenced his career with the Australian Federal Police in 1985. Subsequent to being promoted to the rank of commander in 2002, he became assistant commissioner in 2004. In September 2007 Phelan was appointed as the Chief Police Officer of ACT Policing, aged 44 years. He was then appointed to Deputy Commissioner for National Security at the Australian Federal Police.

During his time with the AFP, Phelan was responsible for international operations and border security in relations to narcotics and people smuggling in 2005. He was the officer who approved the transfer of information relating to the Bali Nine to Indonesian officials.

Phelan graduated from the Melbourne Business School with a Masters of Business Administration and holds a BComm and a LL.B (Honours).

Phelan's wife, Melinda Phelan, is a superintendent who works in the AFP’s Counter Terrorism unit.

Police appointments
Preceded by Audrey Fagan	Chief Police Officer of ACT Policing; 2007–2010	Succeeded by Roman Quaedvlieg
