= Graham Perkin Australian Journalist of the Year Award =

Australian journalism prize

- Awarded for: Outstanding Australian journalist of the year
- Country: Australia
- Presented by: Melbourne Press Club
- First award: 1976

The Graham Perkin Australian Journalist of the Year Award, often known simply as the Graham Perkin Award, is one of Australia's pre-eminent prizes for journalism.

It was established and named in honour of Graham Perkin, who was editor of The Age from 1966 until his death in 1975. Administered by the Melbourne Press Club, the award carries a prize of $20,000.

== Winners ==
- 1976 – Denis Butler (The Newcastle Morning Herald)
- 1977 – Robert Gottliebsen (The Australian Financial Review)
- 1978 – Lenore Nicklin (The Sydney Morning Herald)
- 1979 – Peter Rodgers (The Sydney Morning Herald)
- 1980 – Ron Saw (The Bulletin)
- 1981 – Norman Aisbett and David Tanner (The West Australian)
- 1982 – Peter Smark (The Age)
- 1983 – Evan Whitton (The Sydney Morning Herald)
- 1984 – Creighton Burns (The Age)
- 1985 – Jack Waterford (The Canberra Times)
- 1986 – Bruce Dover and Cameron Forbes (The Herald, Melbourne and The Age)
- 1987 – Terry McCrann (The Age and The Herald, Melbourne)
- 1988 – Michelle Grattan (The Age)
- 1989 – Peter Ellingsen (The Age)
- 1990 – Paul Kelly (The Australian)
- 1991 – Robert Haupt (The Age/The Sydney Morning Herald)
- 1992 – Colleen Ryan (The Sydney Morning Herald)
- 1993 – Les Carlyon
- 1994 – Kate Legge (The Australian)
- 1995 – Rowan Callick (The Australian Financial Review)
- 1996 – Andrew Rule (The Age)
- 1997 – Paul McGeough (The Sydney Morning Herald)
- 1998 – Pamela Williams (The Australian Financial Review)
- 1999 – John Lyons (The Bulletin)
- 2000 – Paul Toohey (The Australian)
- 2001 – Andrew Rule (The Age)
- 2002 – John Spooner (The Age)
- 2003 – Peter Wilson (The Australian)
- 2004 – Paul McGeough (The Sydney Morning Herald/The Age)
- 2005 – Michael Gordon (The Age)
- 2006 – Tony Koch (The Australian)
- 2007 – John Silvester (The Age)
- 2008 – Cameron Stewart (The Australian)
- 2009 – Gary Hughes (The Australian)
- 2010 – Laurie Oakes (Nine Network, The Herald Sun and The Daily Telegraph)
- 2011 – Neil Mitchell (3AW and The Herald Sun)
- 2012 – Joanne McCarthy (The Newcastle Herald)
- 2013 – Caroline Wilson (The Age)
- 2014 – Chris Reason (Seven News)
- 2015 – Adele Ferguson (The Age/Four Corners)
- 2016 – Caro Meldrum-Hanna (Four Corners)
- 2017 – Richard Baker and Nick McKenzie (The Age)
- 2018 – Anthony Dowsley (The Herald Sun)
- 2019 – Anne Connolly (Four Corners)
- 2020 – Nick McKenzie (60 Minutes, Good Weekend)
- 2021 – Samantha Maiden (News.com.au)
- 2022 – Hedley Thomas (The Australian)
- 2023 – Neil Chenoweth and Edmund Tadros (The Australian Financial Review)
