= David Tweed =

Australian businessman

David Tweed is an Australian businessman who conducts a business of offering to buy securities at either below market value, or at a price that is above market value but via installments. Paying in installments can disadvantage the seller due to the time value of money. Tweed's business practices are controversial in some quarters and his success has attracted criticism from the media and the Australian Securities & Investments Commission. The federal government introduced legislation to regulate Tweed's activities.

== Early and personal life ==
Born as David Tschernitz, Tweed is the son of Austrian migrants. He was born and raised in the inner Melbourne suburb of Footscray. He was educated at Penleigh and Essendon Grammar School and graduated from RMIT with a degree in accounting. Tweed's first and only job was as a runner then floor trader and then adviser for brokerage firm, McKinley Wilson, and according to Peter MacLaren (Dec'd), his former boss, he changed his surname to Tweed after he was promoted to the trading room. It transpired that Tweed had assumed the same name as a former business journalist and later sharemarket analyst who had an extended working stay in Europe. His original house doubled as his office and was in Roden Street, West Melbourne, however he has since moved into the Melbourne central business district.

According to the Herald Sun, Tweed lived in a de facto relationship with Donna Newman for 22 years before they married on 23 June 2018, in Las Vegas; they also have three children together. The Sun also alleges that "Mr Tweed has been ostracised by his family, who have begged him to stop his unscrupulous behaviour" but is defended by Ms Newman's father Dennis, who has said that,

"If people have got shares and they have no idea what to do with them, then maybe they are better off without them. Let people who can look after them look after them. I know that sounds very callous but . . . he's not breaking any laws."

== Investment strategy ==
In Australia, there is a high proportion of share ownership by less sophisticated investors. This is a by-product of the demutualisation and other corporate actions in the last 20 years in Australia. Companies such as Insurance Australia Group (IAG).

Tweed set up four companies: National Exchange Pty Ltd, National Share Purchasing Corporation Pty Ltd (NSPC), Direct Share Purchasing Corporation Pty Ltd (DSPC) and Australian Share Purchasing Corporation (ASPC). By obtaining contact details through the share register of target companies, he has made several offers to purchase shares in those companies. The offers are often far below the market prices that could be realised on the Australian Securities Exchange (ASX). For instance, when AMP was trading at around $17, Tweed offered $13 for the shares which subsequently fell to $5. Tweed's offers would often be in the form of a cover letter with large font detailing his offer and with an enclosed off-market transfer form that was pre-filled with the details of the target shareholder. A large number of shareholders, often elderly people who had never owned shares before, would take up the offer despite the market price clearly available in newspapers such as the Sydney Morning Herald and Australian Financial Review.

Tweed has been accused of unethical behaviour and of taking advantage of unsophisticated shareholders. Gossip columnists Suzanne Carbone and Lawrence Money of The Age called him a "[t]ight-fisted share-scammer", David Elias, also of The Age, called him "a man with no conscience". The Sydney Morning Herald reports that Tweed once stated that "I didn't do morals at school." He has also been described as an "..indefatigable bottom feeder" by Ian Porter and Nabila Ahmed of The Age.

In general, no law has been broken by Tweed in advancing his offers. Several shareholders who had accepted Tweed's offers annulled the contract due to technicalities in the off-market transfer process; however, the great proportion were relieved of their shares. Whenever a technicality has been identified, Tweed has amended his practices to stay one step ahead of the law, thus frustrating those that would like to shut him down. Tweed has mercilessly sued to enforce performance of agreements signed, often for minor amounts of less than $1000. These cases are usually settled in his favour and also enable the former shareholders to avoid the legal costs of mounting a defence.

To foil his schemes, several measures have been attempted. Companies have tried to close their share registers, citing National Privacy Principles (NPP) or providing them in a non-machine readable form (to make it difficult for Tweed to easily create offer letters); a court case in 2003 required that all offers that Tweed advanced would need to attach the last known market price of the shares in question. In September 2010, Tweed put out a press release stating, 'that after suing Challenger Financial Services, Challenger settled by refunding $10k of his legal costs and also provided Tweed with a new register for their frozen mortgage fund'. In September 2010, Tweed began an action against Wesfarmers for breaking the law by not providing its share register. Wesfarmers gave up at the door of the court and agreed to pay Tweed his full costs. Queensland based LM Investments is fighting Tweed on the same basis as Wesfarmers.

In each instance, rather than retiring his scheme, Tweed has fought back. The share registers are a matter of public record, and Tweed brought action against companies that attempted to close their registers. On 13 December 2010, legislation was implemented that stopped share predators from obtaining share registers in Australia.

When required to advertise the market prices of the shares, Tweed began advancing offers to buy the shares 'in installments' so that people ignorant of the time value of money would not be able to easily evaluate whether to keep or sell their shares.

Tweed has brought his share purchase activities to New Zealand. On 13 March 2007, Tweed featured on a New Zealand consumer protection programme - TARGET. The television programme revealed that he had established a company in New Zealand called "COLONIAL CAPITAL CORPORATION". Attempts to contact the company by reporters of that programme were thwarted by an absence of contact details. A search of the NZ company's office reveals that the address for service of the company is given as the office of 'Andrew James Kennedy'. Mr Kennedy is a commercial and taxation lawyer. The address of his law firm, Prudentia law, corresponds with that of the company.

== Investment history ==
In September 2003, the Supreme Court of Victoria found that Tweed's offer to purchase shares from investors in OneSteel was deceptive. He had offered to purchase them for $2 a share over a 15-year period through his company National Exchange Propriety Limited. At the time the accounting group KPMG calculated that this valued the shares at just 78 cents in today's dollars. In his ruling, Justice Robert Osborne stated that the National Exchange acceptance form was so worded that before it could enforce a binding contract on people tempted by low-ball purchase offers, they had to send in the shareholder registration number as well as the signed form before the deadline set out in the offer. The court action was undertaken by David Tweed against David Vane, a caretaker whom he took to the court to claim $977.

In December 2005 he made an offer (through his companies NSPC, DSPC and ASPC) to purchase IAG shares. NSPC offered shareholders $8.10 per share, paid out over 18 annual instalments of 45 cents per share. This meant that shareholders would have received the final payment in 2023. DSPC made an offer for $3.00 per share and another for $3.50 per share. According to IAG this was less than the lowest price at which IAG's shares have traded in the past year.

Through his company National Exchange, Tweed attempted to gain control of Clime Asset Management in 2005 through 2006, as well as calling extraordinary general meetings (at Clime's cost) to have the board of directors of the company removed. The board stated that investors bought into Clime due to Roger Montgomery a Clime director. By 30 June 2009 Montgomery had quit Clime after having sold his 25-year management contract for over $3m. At one point Tweed offered to be bought out of Clime at their net tangible asset value (NTA), which Clime refused to do. However, this attempt was halted by ASIC in August 2006, who raised "serious objections to the way the bid was structured" by Australian Share Purchasing Company Pty Ltd (ASPC). ASPC withdrew from the takeover soon after. Clime has consistently traded below NTA since.

In 2006, Tweed changed tack slightly and offered investors $13 per share, while the price was $8.91. However, he offered to pay them the $13 in 20 annual instalments of 65 cents per instalment. This allowed Tweed to take advantage of the time value of money, while disadvantaging investors. He also wrote to AMP investors offering them $13 per share, while the price was $8.91. In a similar way to previous offers, Tweed offered to pay them the $13 in 20 annual instalments of 65 cents per instalment.

Tweed took AMP to the Federal Court of Australia alleging that they unfairly sold his company, Direct Share Purchasing Corp (DSPC), the share register for an inflated figure of $44,000. Tweed believed that he should have been sold the register from between $231 and $750 and that it was against the Corporations Act to have charged a figure he believes was too high. Upon appeal, the Full Federal Court unanimously found Tweed's DSPC had been charged $17,000 by Axa for Axa's share register when a "generous" fee was $250. In a letter dated 11 November 2007, Tweed's company, Colonial Capital Corporation, offered to buy BHP Billiton shares at a price of $42.47. Similar to the nature previous offers, payment was to be in 18 instalments of $2.36.

In March 2011, Justice White of the Supreme Court of New South Wales found that fund manager Perpetual was justified in double-checking with shareholders before processing transfers, part of its fiduciary duties as the responsible entity. White also found that Perpetual was justified in not processing forms.

In 2012, Tweed settled a dispute over $35,000 on the steps of the Melbourne Magistrates Court with 77-year-old Annelott Gerandt. Tweed tried to buy units in the Colonial First State Mortgage Income Fund for half their face value from Gerandt, who thought that the paperwork she received was from Colonial.
