= Jack Waterford =

Australian journalist and commentator

- Born: John Edward O'Brien Waterford; 12 February 1952 (age 73); Coonamble, New South Wales, Australia
- Occupation: Journalist & Commentator

John Edward O'Brien Waterford AM (born 12 February 1952), better known as Jack Waterford, is an Australian journalist and commentator. He has a long affiliation with The Canberra Times.

Waterford graduated in law from the Australian National University. He began his journalism career as a cadet with The Canberra Times in 1972, covering a broad range of rounds before being appointed Deputy Editor in 1987, Editor in 1995, and Editor-in-Chief in 2001. Waterford is well known for his investigative journalism using Freedom of Information legislation and for his work and advocacy on indigenous health issues and on the national trachoma and eye health program. He has delivered papers at many public forums and written book chapters on areas as diverse as press freedom, the High Court of Australia, public administration and the Petrov Affair.

He was appointed to a Jefferson Fellowship at the East–West Center in 1987. He is a board member of the Asia Pacific Journalism Centre.

Waterford faced criticism when the then Chief Police Officer for the Australian Capital Territory (ACT), Audrey Fagan, killed herself two weeks after he wrote an editorial criticising the Australian Federal Police and their media management practices.

== Honours ==
Waterford received the Graham Perkin Australian Journalist of the Year Award in 1985.

He was named a Member of the Order of Australia (AM) in the 2007 Australia Day Honours, "for service to journalism, particularly as a commentator on national politics, the law, to raising debate on ethical issues and public sector accountability, and to the community in the area of Indigenous affairs".

In March 2007, Waterford was named Canberra Citizen of the Year. Presenting the award, ACT Chief Minister Jon Stanhope said Waterford was a champion of many causes and a leading figure in his trade.

== Bibliography ==
- Waterford, Jack (1996). The future of public administration in Australia. Canberra: PSMPC.
- — (March 2003). "Groundswell". Correspondence. Quarterly Essay. 9: 80–83.
