= Penleigh and Essendon Grammar School =

School in Australia

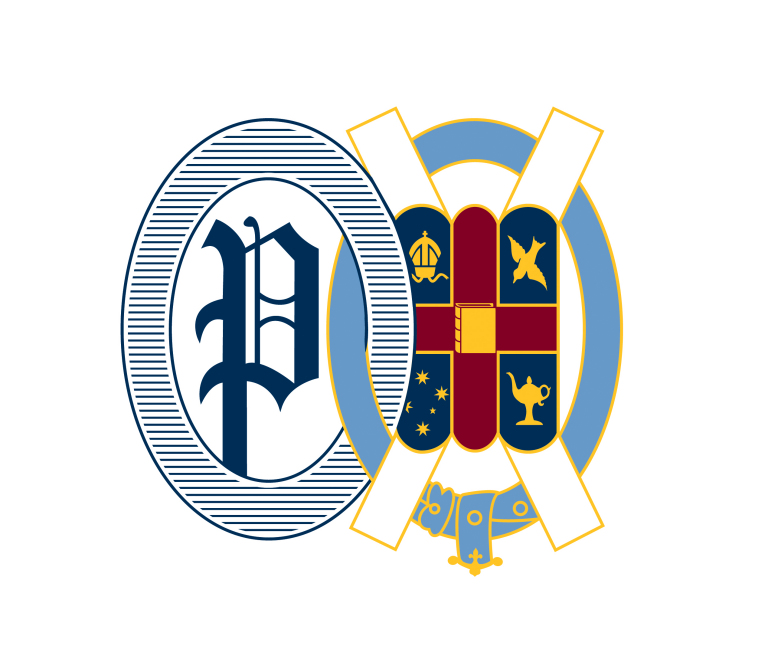

Location
- Essendon, Moonee Ponds, Keilor Park & Keilor East, Victoria; Australia; 37°43′52″S 144°52′12″E

Information
- Type: Independent comprehensive co-educational early learning, primary and secondary day school
- Mottoes: Essendon: Latin: Sapienter ac Viriliter; Penleigh: Latin: Ad Altiora (Essendon: Strength through knowledge; Penleigh: To higher things)
- Denomination: in association with the Uniting Church
- Established: 1871; 155 years ago (as Penleigh Ladies College); 1872; 154 years ago (as Essendon Grammar); 1977; 49 years ago (Amalgamated schools)
- Principal: Kate Dullard
- Employees: ~300
- Years: P–12
- Gender: Co-educational
- Enrolment: c. 2,587
- Campuses: Essendon; Moonee Ponds; Keilor East
- Campus type: Suburban
- Colours: Navy, maroon, pale blue, bottle green and gold
- Nickname: PEGS
- Affiliation: Associated Grammar Schools of Victoria
- Website: www.pegs.vic.edu.au

Penleigh and Essendon Grammar School (abbreviated as PEGS) is a multi-campus independent Uniting Church comprehensive co-educational early learning, primary and secondary day school, with three campuses located in Melbourne, Victoria, Australia. The school is the product of an amalgamation of two schools, Penleigh Presbyterian Ladies' College and Essendon Grammar School, which was completed in 1977. Uniforms were different for boys and girls until term 3 2020 when a new combined school uniform was launched. The school's campuses are located in Essendon, Moonee Ponds and Keilor East.

The school is a member of the Associated Grammar Schools of Victoria and competes against the other member schools in a range of sports.

== History ==
The history of Penleigh and Essendon Grammar School is the history of two schools, Penleigh Ladies' College and Essendon Grammar School. Each of these schools has its origins in the early years of Melbourne.

=== Carlton College, St Thomas' Grammar School, and Northern Grammar School ===
Carlton College opened in 1872 and this school occupied several premises in the Parkville area. This school combined with St Thomas' Grammar in 1910, when they moved to a larger property in Essendon. Northern Grammar School commenced its operation in 1921 in the Moonee Ponds area but soon moved to new premises on the site of St. John's Church in Essendon. In 1924, the school acquired the present site at 59 Raleigh Street, Essendon.

=== Essendon Grammar School ===
Essendon Grammar School was established in 1934 following the amalgamation of Northern Grammar School and St. Thomas' Grammar School.

In 1948, Essendon Grammar School began its affiliation with the Presbyterian Church. The site of the senior school in Keilor East was purchased in 1956 and this new campus of the school was officially opened by the Prime Minister of Australia, Robert Menzies, in 1960. In 1968, the Old Essendon Grammarians Football Club was formed by the school's alumni.

=== Penleigh Ladies' College ===
Penleigh was originally established in 1871 as Dorset House, Mrs. Tulloch's School for Young Ladies. The school occupied several sites in the Moonee Ponds area. The school developed and expanded particularly under the guidance of the Limerock sisters, Lilian Mary Limerock (1883–1969), Elma Vivian Limerock (1888–1964), and Elizabeth Muriel Limerock (1892–1973).

The school was renamed Penleigh Ladies' College during the First World War and it moved to the present site at 83 Park Street, Moonee Ponds in 1921. After the Second World War Penleigh was purchased from the Limerock sisters by the Presbyterian Church.

=== Co-operation and amalgamation ===
The first links between Essendon Grammar School and Penleigh Ladies' College were established in 1952 when Intermediate and Leaving students participated in some common classes. By 1969, the councils of the two schools agreed to integrate the two schools at the senior levels. In 1973, the co-educational senior college, McNab House, was established on the Keilor East site. The two schools were amalgamated in 1977 to form Penleigh and Essendon Grammar School; the school also connected with the Uniting Church when it came into existence in 1977 and became an incorporated body in 1982. In the following year, the school purchased property at Lake Eildon to develop an Outdoor Education Programme.

In 2010 the school commenced a substantial, multi-campus redevelopment to run over several years. Another site of approximately 40 acres (160,000 m^{2}) was purchased in the Keilor Park area in 2006 and has been developed as the school's sporting grounds. These included the new senior campus called the Infinity Centre which was renamed to the Larkin Centre in 2019 in celebration of retiring principal Tony Larkin, and a redeveloped middle school boys campus called Gottliebsen house, named after Robert Gottliebsen, and the girls campus called McNab house, named after the McNab family – a family with 5 generations of history within the school.

== Sport ==
PEGS is a member of the Associated Grammar Schools of Victoria (AGSV).

The PEGS Football Club, which competes in the Victorian Amateur Football Association (VAFA), plays its home matches at the PEGS Sporting Fields.

=== AGSV and AGSV/APS premierships ===
PEGS has won the following AGSV and AGSV/APS premierships.

Boys:

- Badminton – 2002
- Cricket (3) – 2010, 2018, 2020
- Football (14) – 1977, 1991, 1993, 1994, 1995, 1998, 2006, 2007, 2010, 2011, 2013, 2018, 2019, 2025
- Hockey (2) – 1990, 2017
- Soccer (14) – 1991, 1994, 1996, 1998, 2002, 2007, 2010, 2013, 2016, 2017, 2019, 2021, 2022
- Squash – 2004
- Table tennis – 2014
- Tennis (8) – 1990, 1991, 1995, 1997, 2015, 2017, 2018, 2019

Girls:

- Athletics (8) – 1995, 1996, 1997, 1998, 1999, 2000, 2001, 2009
- Badminton – 2021
- Basketball (3) – 2004, 2011, 2012
- Cross Country (5) – 1995, 1996, 1997, 2009, 2025
- Netball – 2010
- Soccer – 2021
- Softball – 2019
- Swimming (9) – 1995, 1996, 1997, 1998, 1999, 2000, 2003, 2004, 2009 (Girls)
- Tennis (2) – 2018, 2020
- Volleyball – 2006

== Notable alumni ==
- Eric Bana – Actor
- Shannon Bennett – Australian chef/restaurateur and founder of the Vue de Monde restaurant
- Nik Constantinou – NFL punter
- Trent Cotchin – AFL Richmond player
- Zac Dawson – AFL St Kilda, Fremantle and Hawthorn
- Corey Ellis – AFL footballer
- Dustin Fletcher – AFL Essendon player
- Cyril Gove – Victorian Football League (VFL) footballer with Essendon Football Club and amateur jockey
- Robert Gottliebsen – Journalist and business commentator, founder of ‘’Business Review Weekly‘’ magazine
- Andre Haermeyer – Australian Labor Party – Member of Victorian Legislative Assembly 1992–2008
- Linden Hall – Olympian
- Joan Kirner – First female Premier of Victoria (also attended University High School)
- Herbert Larkin — Australian flying ace (First World War) and pioneer aviator
- Jayden Laverde – AFL Essendon Football Club
- Andrej Lemanis – Head coach of the Australian men's national basketball team
- Jim McColl – Footballer and agricultural scientist
- Brett McLeod – Newsreader with National Nine News
- Jake Melksham – AFL, Melbourne Football Club
- Connor Metcalfe – Soccer, current player for FC St Pauli and the Socceroos
- Jason Moran – Mobster, drug trafficker
- Rick Olarenshaw – Former AFL Essendon and Collingwood player
- Cameron Rayner – AFL footballer, Brisbane Lions
- Barak Sopé – Former Prime Minister of Vanuatu
- Cameron Stevenson – Cricketer, Melbourne Renegades, Tasmania Tigers
- Curtis Stone – Chef and restaurateur
- Curtis Taylor – AFL footballer
- Kelvin Thomson – Former Victorian and federal Labor politician
- Madge Titheradge and sister, Lily Titheradge – Stage and film actresses
- Joshua Toy – AFL Gold Coast Suns
- Jackson Trengove – AFL footballer
- David Tweed – Share market opportunist
- Daniel Venables – AFL footballer, West Coast Eagles
- Elizabeth Watson – Netballer
- Matthew Watson – AFL Carlton player
- Scott West – AFL Western Bulldogs player
