= Evan Whitton =

Australian journalist (1928–2018)

Evan Whitton (5 March 1928 – 16 July 2018) was an Australian journalist.

Whitton was raised in Murgon in Queensland, and went away to boarding school at age eight. He worked as a teacher for 14 years in Toowoomba before securing a ful-time role as a journalist with The Toowoomba Chronicle. He then worked as a reporter for the Melbourne newspaper Truth before working briefly for the new Sunday Australian in 1971. During the 1970s Whitton worked for The National Times where he became assistant editor from 1975 to 1978 and editor from 1978 to 1981. He then moved to the Sydney Morning Herald as chief reporter. After a period as Reader in Journalism at the University of Queensland from 1990, he was a columnist with the online legal journal Justinian. Much of his later writing focussed on analysis and comparison of the investigative and adversarial systems of justice.

Whitton won five Walkley Awards, for Best Newspaper Feature Story in 1967 and 1975, Best Piece of Newspaper Reporting in 1970, and Best Story Published in an Australian Magazine in 1973 and 1974.

In 1983 he was awarded the Graham Perkin Australian Journalist of the Year award and in 2011 was made an inaugural member of the Australian Media Hall of Fame.

Whitton died on 16 July 2018, aged 90.

== Early life and education ==
Whitton was born in Muswellbrook NSW on 5 March 1928 to Thomas Evan Whitton and Bernice Collopy.

Whitton's father had been among the earliest volunteers to sign up to serve in World War 1, fighting at Gallipoli and at Pozieres on the Western Front where he was badly wounded, eventually requiring the amputation of both legs.

On his eventual repatriation to Australia and recuperation, he purchased, with his backpay, the Muswellbrook Chronicle newspaper in partnership with his brother-in-law and remained the joint owner of the newspaper from 1921 to 1936.

Whitton's mother Bernice Margaret Collopy, who trained at Sydney Hospital as a nurse was also one of the first Anzac volunteers to serve. She saw much pain and suffering among the wounded soldiers and dealt with much hardship with the other nurses while on duty in the various war sites. She met Thomas while he was in recuperation in Sydney before marrying him in 1925.

In 1936 Whitton's father moved the family to Murgon, a small town 270 kilometres (170 mi) north-west of Brisbane where he ran a newsagency and stationery store. From 1938 to 1946 Whitton attended Downlands College, a Catholic boarding school in Toowoomba run by the Missionaries of the Sacred Heart.

== Teaching career and rugby involvement ==
On completing his studies at Downlands, Whitton attended Queensland Teachers College and, in the early 1950s, returned to Downlands teaching mainly English and social studies eventually becoming senior English master. He also coached the college's senior rugby union team. Whitton remained as a teacher at the college for 14 years. Whitton was a keen rugby union player, administrator and coach and, along with a few others, is credited with keeping the game alive in what is a rugby league stronghold. Whitton was involved in Toowoomba rugby in the 1950s as a player and official before the game folded in the area in 1960. In 1963, he was part of a group that reformed the Toowoomba Rangers club side to play in the Brisbane competition and then, from 1964, in the newly established Darling Downs Risdon Cup competition. During this period Whitton also began writing as a stringer for the Toowoomba Chronicle. He lived near Downlands with his young family. He wrote on rugby union for The Chronicle under the nom de plum "Twickers" (a popular name for Twickenham Stadium, the English Rugby Football Union's headquarters in London). His writing differed to the formularised sports writing of the time showing a little of the sardonic style that was to become his trademark. For instance, he wrote of new players recruited for the Rangers thus: "Some are a little vague as to how to comport themselves in the rucks, but this is no reason for despair – not too many of the club’s senior team have a profound grasp of the technique either".

He also established a rugby library at Downlands and had it opened by the president of the Australian Rugby Union.

== Journalism ==
In 1964 Whitton joined the staff of The Chronicle as a full-time journalist and in January 1966 he took up a position with the newspaper, Truth, in Melbourne. At Truth, a weekly tabloid devoted to smut and scandal, he worked under the editorship of Fleet Street veteran Solly Chandler. Mark Day, a columnist for The Australian and former part-owner of Truth, said Whitton regarded the tabloid as a place where he could do "something noble in the art of muckraking and shedding light".

Whitton wrote about the corrupt underbelly of Victoria during the Liberal premiership of Henry Bolte and his deputy Sir Arthur Rylah, winning two Walkley awards for his work. Whitton won his first Walkley for Best Newspaper Feature story in 1967 for a report on living as a pensioner in Melbourne and his second, in 1970, for his 1969 coverage of Bertram Wainer's allegations of police extortion from abortion clinics which led to the 1970 Board of Inquiry into Allegations of Corruption in the Police Force in Connection with Illegal Abortion headed by William Kaye AO QC. Whitton also wrote on the disappearance of the, then, Liberal Prime Minister, Harold Holt in 1967 and on the hanging of Ronald Ryan, Australia's last execution.

While the story of police corruption and abortion for Truth made Whitton's name, he also, when not busy with more significant matters, wrote what he called soft porn for the paper that thrived on both substance and sex.

In 1971 he moved briefly to News Ltd's short lived The Sunday Australian in Sydney. While there he and his second wife, Noela, combined to produce an expose of the political dealings behind the case of Rupert Maxwell Stuart, an indigenous man who was wrongly convicted of the rape and murder of a nine-year-old girl in South Australia and, at one stage, sentenced to death. Unable to interest his editors in the story, he travelled to South Australia with his wife at his own expense where, with some difficulty, he managed to secure an interview for them both with Stuart. However, Whitton could still not convince the editors of The Sunday Australian nor his former editors at Truth to publish a story on the case and instead it was offered to The Digger, a new, alternative journal. The front-page report in the inaugural issue drew national interest. The story appeared under the by line of "Nola McMahon" a pseudonym for his wife, Noela, and Whitton's presence at the interview was made invisible. Stuart was eventually freed by the Don Dunstan government in 1973. Around the same time Whitton wrote, seeking employment, to an old rugby union opponent from his time in the Brisbane competition, V J Carrol, who was then the editor-in-chief of the Australian Financial Review and the nascent National Times. Carroll, took him on and Whitton commenced under the editorship of M.V. (Max) Suich at the National Times and Carroll more broadly.

At the National Times, a weekly paper focussing on politics, social mores, and corruption, Whitton produced acclaimed post-mortems on the Petrov Affair, the HMAS Voyager disaster and the Vietnam war. The latter, his most significant work during this time, was "a three part, 25,000 word dissection of the disastrous decision-making and rhetorical casuistry that led to Australia’s military involvement in the Vietnam War". His exhaustive research was published on 19 April 1975 just as Saigon was about to fall to the National Liberation Front and the North Vietnamese Army. The investigation exploded the myth that then prime minister, Robert Menzies had sent his troops to war as a loyal US ally. Damning diplomatic documents confirmed it was Menzies who had pushed the US into war. Whitton went on to become assistant editor of the National Times from 1975 to 1978 and editor from 1978 to 1981.

In 1981 he moved to The Sydney Morning Herald as chief reporter. While there he covered what was referred to as the Wran Royal Commission which inquired into corruption allegations surrounding the then NSW Chief Stipendiary Magistrate, Murray Farquhar.

In 1983 Whitton won the Melbourne Press Club's Graham Perkin Australian Journalist of the Year Award for "courage and innovation" in his reporting on the commission.

Whitton became The Sydney Morning Herald's European correspondent in 1984 and on returning to Australia covered Queensland's Fitzgerald Inquiry, 1987 to 1989.

After retiring from The Sydney Morning Herald he became, in 1990, reader in journalism at the University of Queensland. He also continued to cover legal affairs for the online legal journal, Justinian, and wrote extensively on the relative merits of the adversarial and inquisitorial systems of justice.

In 2011 Whitton was made an inaugural member of the Australian Media Hall of Fame.

=== Journalistic style ===
Whitton was known for his long-form narrative journalism – writing non-fiction as meticulously researched narrative, linking detail of characters and events into patterns with dialogue, atmosphere and tone. His stories, while often challengingly long, were deftly enlivened with humour. Whitton's view was that "so long as you insert a joke every 30 or so paragraphs you may be able to persuade the reader to struggle on through a long piece".

Whitton's initial experience writing for newspapers was with The Toowoomba Chronicle to which he first contributed as a stringer with pieces on rugby union and then as a full-time reporter in 1964. His background of 15 years teaching English served him well in his new employment and his work, at least in relation to his pieces on rugby, reflected a unique, often sardonic style stirring the curiosity of readers used to a more formularised style of sports writing.

On commencing with Truth in Melbourne in 1966 he came to thrive under the influence of Stanley Cecil 'Sol' Chandler, hired from Fleet Street to assist in the start-up of Rupert Murdoch's The Australian and then repositioned by Murdoch to maximise the profits of Truth.

"My old master, Sol Chandler, observed that the first task of the reporter is to interest the customer" said Whitton in 1987 at the launch his book, Amazing Scenes.

Chandler came to have a deep and lasting influence on Whitton's career both in terms of writing style and his approach to gathering content.

Chandler's adamant demand for every detail was famously illustrated when the lover of the drowned Prime Minister, Harold Holt, secured the right to vet the copy of her description, given to Whitton, of Holt's last hours. Whitton recalls that "the only thing Chandler told me to fight for was that a tame rabbit nibbled the grass outside her Portsea window".

Whitton saw this demand for detail as squaring with what came to be known as neo-journalism, most clearly evidenced in the work of Tom Wolfe which he admired. Wolfe had successfully employed what Whitton regarded as simply the techniques of fiction: "scene by scene construction, lots of dialogue and yards of description in the style of Balzac or, come to that, Raymond Chandler”.

Chandler had also influenced Whitton in how he gathered information, once advising him that "A journalist should drink and go to the races. Harold Holt has told me things in the gentleman’s urinal at Flemington he would never have dreamed of telling me sober".

In this regard Whitton came to epitomise "old school" gumshoe reporting and eye-witness observation; "he worked the cafes, pubs, clubs, watch-houses and courthouses chatting, listening and taking notes".

David Hickie, a Sydney Morning Herald contemporary who later became editor-in-chief of that paper and The Sun Herald, described him as a "formidable investigative journalist who insisted on forensic research and scrupulous fact-checking accuracy". Whiton preferred the term "disclosure" rather than investigative journalism. He referred to his particular style within this field as "pattern journalism". The technique was, in Whitton's view, most simply summed up in the dictum of investigative reporter James B Steele of The Philadelphia Inquirer: "The challenge is to gather, marshal, and organise vast amounts of data already in the public domain, and see what it adds up to".

Whitton used a story telling style, establishing boxes with details of time and place meticulously laid out and, putting new fact within the context of what had gone before, would then go on to reveal the connections he had established between the boxes and show a previously unapparent reality.

Whitton saw the key to the pattern emerging as being a strict chronology quoting his former editor at The National Times, V J Carrol: “ Once you get the chronology right, everything falls into place".

== Personal life ==
Whitton first encountered his second wife, then Noela McMahon, in Murgon as a young boy of eight. Whitton left Murgon shortly after to board at Downlands College in Toowoomba but as teenagers he and Noela exchanged letters and went out in the holidays. Whitton then went to Teachers College where he met his first wife Irene who shared with him a love of literature and encouraged him to write.After doing the indentured country teaching, which he did not like he began teaching at Downlands College. Noela had left Murgon to teach speech and drama. Both started separate relationships during this period.

Whitton endeavoured to stay in touch with Noela by letters sent to the Kingaroy Hotel where she was staying several days a week to teach in the town. The publican, who knew Noela's then partner's family, opened the letters and destroyed them. Whitton thought Noela had lost interest but, before marrying, Noela phoned Whitton from a garage while visiting Toowoomba. Although they spoke and Whitton asked her to wait for him at the garage, she was with others and couldn't wait.

Noela married her husband, Des, a World War II veteran, at 21 and had four children by the time she was 26. Noela reflects that her, then, husband suffered from undiagnosed post-traumatic stress and drank very heavily. Their marriage began to break down but it was only when she unexpectedly met Whitton again at his mother's house in Brisbane that she thought of leaving. She moved to Melbourne with her children where she worked two jobs to support them.

Whitton, meanwhile, had married Irene Patricia Wilkes, also a school teacher, and had three children. However, when he met Noela again in Brisbane the flame was relit and they stayed in contact.

Whitton says that his decision to quit teaching and take a job on The Toowoomba Chronicle in 1964 was stage one of his plan to leave the marriage. This avoided what would have been a scandal for his employer, a Catholic college. The second stage, in 1965, was to secure a position with Truth, in Melbourne, where Noela was living. This perhaps also had the advantage of avoiding the opprobrium that would have likely arisen in Toowoomba.

After leaving Truth and moving to the Sunday Australian Whitton could not interest that paper in covering the Rupert Stuart case. He took leave and drove with Noela to Adelaide and completed an interview with Stuart and further research. Whitton was advised against writing on the case given his employers would not publish it. Instead Noela compiled a report on the background to the case and the interview and got it printed in The Digger thus setting in train the events that led to Stuart's eventual release.

While Whitton was working as The Sydney Morning Herald's European correspondent in 1984 he and Noela finally married. The ceremony was held at the Australian embassy in Paris, with Gough Whitlam, former Prime Minister and then ambassador to UNESCO, as best man and Margaret Whitlam matron of honour.

== Bibliography ==
- Can of Worms: A Citizen's Reference Book to Crime and the Administration of Justice (1986) ISBN 0949054313
- Can of Worms II: A Citizen's Reference Book to Crime and the Administration of Justice (1986) ISBN 0949054968
- Amazing Scenes (1987) ISBN 064212809X
- The Hillbilly Dictator: Australia's Police State (1989) ISBN 064212809X
- Trial by Voodoo: Why the Law Defeats Justice & Democracy (1994) ISBN 0091828805
- The Cartel: Lawyers and their Nine Magic Tricks (1998) ISBN 0646348876
- Serial Liars: How Lawyers Get the Money and Get the Criminals Off (2005) ISBN 9781411658752
- Our Corrupt Legal System (2010) ISBN 9781921681073
