= John Lyons (journalist) =

Australian journalist

John Lyons (born 1961) is an Australian journalist. As of 2025, Lyons is Americas editor at the Australian Broadcasting Corporation, having previously been its global affairs editor.

== Early life and education ==
John Lyons was born in 1961.

== Career ==
Lyons was formerly editor of the Sydney Morning Herald and executive producer of the Sunday program on the Nine Network.

He was associate editor (digital) and a senior reporter at The Australian, before being appointed executive editor of ABC News and head of investigative journalism for the Australian Broadcasting Corporation (ABC) in 2017. In 2017 he was a foreign correspondent in the United States and Israel.

On 5 June 2019, Lyons live-tweeted when the Australian Federal Police raided the Sydney office of the ABC, the day after their raid on the home of Annika Smethurst. He reported that they had downloaded 9214 documents which then had to be assessed in terms of the warrant issued.

Lyons became Americas editor at the ABC in March 2025, after having been its global affairs editor.

The ABC was barred from US president Donald Trump’s UK press conference in September 2025 after Lyons asked Trump: "Is it appropriate, President Trump, that a president in office should be engaged in so much business activity?" Trump was upset by the question and prevaricated, saying that it was his sons, not him, who were involved in the businesses.

== Awards ==
Lyons won the Graham Perkin Australian Journalist of the Year Award in 1999 for his work with The Bulletin.

Lyons has won the following Walkley Awards:

- 1999, for Commentary, Analysis, Opinion & Critique, for his national affairs reporting for The Bulletin
- 2001, for Broadcast Interviewing for his television interviews on the Sunday
- 2014, for Investigative Journalism as part of a Four Corners team's reporting on the Israeli military's treatment of Palestinian children

In August 2024, at the Kennedy Awards for Outstanding Journalism, Lyons won the Journalist of the Year award, as well as Outstanding Team Player or Mentor and Outstanding Feature Writing awards, for his reporting from the Middle East.

== Books ==
- Balcony Over Jerusalem: A Middle East Memoir (HarperCollins, 2017)
- Dateline Jerusalem: Journalism's Toughest Assignment (Monash University Publishing, 2021)
- A Bunker in Kyiv: The Astonishing Story of the People's Army Defying Putin (HarperCollins, April 2025)

== Personal life ==
Lyons married Sylvie Le Clezio and they have one son. As of 2021 they were living in Sydney.
