= ACT Policing =

Law enforcement in Canberra, Australia

- Common name: ACT Policing
- Abbreviation: ACTPol
- Motto: Working together for a safer community

Agency overview
- Formed: 19 October 1979
- Preceding agency: Australian Capital Territory Police (1927)

Jurisdictional structure
- Operations jurisdiction: Australian Capital Territory, Australia
- Australian Capital Territory Police jurisdiction
- Area: 2,358 km^{2} (910 sq mi)
- Population: 453,324 (December 2021)
- Governing body: Government of the Australian Capital Territory
- Constituting instruments: Australian Federal Police Act 1979, Section 8; ACT Policing Arrangement, 14 June 2006; Purchase Agreement for the Provision of Policing Services to the ACT
- General nature: Local civilian police

Operational structure
- Headquarters: Winchester Police Centre, Belconnen, ACT
- Sworn members: 731 (June 2023)
- Unsworn members: 270 (June 2023)
- Minister responsible: Mick Gentleman, Police and Emergency Services
- Agency executives: Neil Gaughan, Chief Police Officer, Deputy Commissioner; Doug Boudry, Deputy Chief Police Officer, Assistant Commissioner
- Units: 7: Specialist Response Group (SRG); Criminal Investigations (CI); Traffic Operations; Crime Reduction; Forensic Services; Water police; Rural patrol
- Districts: 2: North District; South District
- Services provided by: Australian Federal Police
- Uniformed as: Australian Federal Police

Facilities
- Stations: 5: City Police Station; Belconnen Police Station; Joint Emergency Services Centre Gungahlin; Woden Police Station; Tuggeranong Police Station
- Watch houses: 1: City Watch House
- Patrol cars: Yes
- Motor bikes: Yes
- Special purpose vehicles: Yes
- Push bikes: Yes
- Boats: Yes
- Dogs: Yes
- Horses: No

Notables
- People: Colin Winchester, Agency head, for being assassinated; Audrey Fagan, Agency head, for unexpected death
- Programmes: Neighbourhood Watch; Crime Stoppers

Website
- www.police.act.gov.au
- "ACT Policing Annual Report 2022–2023" (PDF). Australian Federal Police. Archived (PDF) from the original on 19 October 2023.

ACT Policing is the portfolio of the Australian Federal Police (AFP) responsible for providing policing services to the Australian Capital Territory (ACT). The Australian Capital Territory Police was an independent police force responsible for policing the ACT until 19 October 1979, when it was merged with the Commonwealth Police to form the AFP.

== History ==
In 1911, the ACT was proclaimed as the seat of Australian government, then the Federal Capital Territory under Commonwealth Government administration. Until 1927, the New South Wales Police patrolled what was mostly rural bushland, except for a small and slowly expanding capital city of Canberra. By the mid-1920s plans were well underway to move Parliament and several Commonwealth Government departments to Canberra and many public buildings were on the verge of being constructed.

In 1926, the Commonwealth Attorney-General determined that policing in the Territory should be performed by a local force. The Federal Capital Territory Police was formed by the Police Ordinance 1927 and staffed by 11 men, 10 former Commonwealth Police Officers and the former NSW Police Sergeant, who had been in charge of the NSW Police contingent in Canberra. The force soon changed its name to the Commonwealth Police (Australian Capital Territory), until 1957 when it formally adopted the name, Australian Capital Territory Police Force. In July 1972 the Aboriginal tent embassy set up by Gary Foley and other notable activists was torn down by ACT police forces for the first time, however many more tents were set up and again torn down by the ACT police.

On 19 October 1979, as a result of a Commonwealth Government restructure of Australian national policing services, the ACT Police Force amalgamated with the Commonwealth Police to form the Australian Federal Police (AFP). The AFP assumed responsibility for policing the ACT, retaining the role to this day, notable as the ACT attained a degree of self-government in 1989. ACT Policing currently consists of around 1,015 people of which 731 are sworn police, 270 unsworn and 14 PSOs.

=== Female officers ===
In January 1947, the chief of the Canberra Police advised several applications were received for a police woman position, having previous police experience, and knowledge of child welfare work, but not with any military provost experience. The first female officer was appointed to the force on 18 April 1947, the first of two positions, from more than twenty applicants. In plain clothes, they were also originally appointed as probation officers under the Juvenile Offenders (Probation) Ordinance. By 1976 the ACT Police had 563 male and 17 female officers.

== Organisation ==
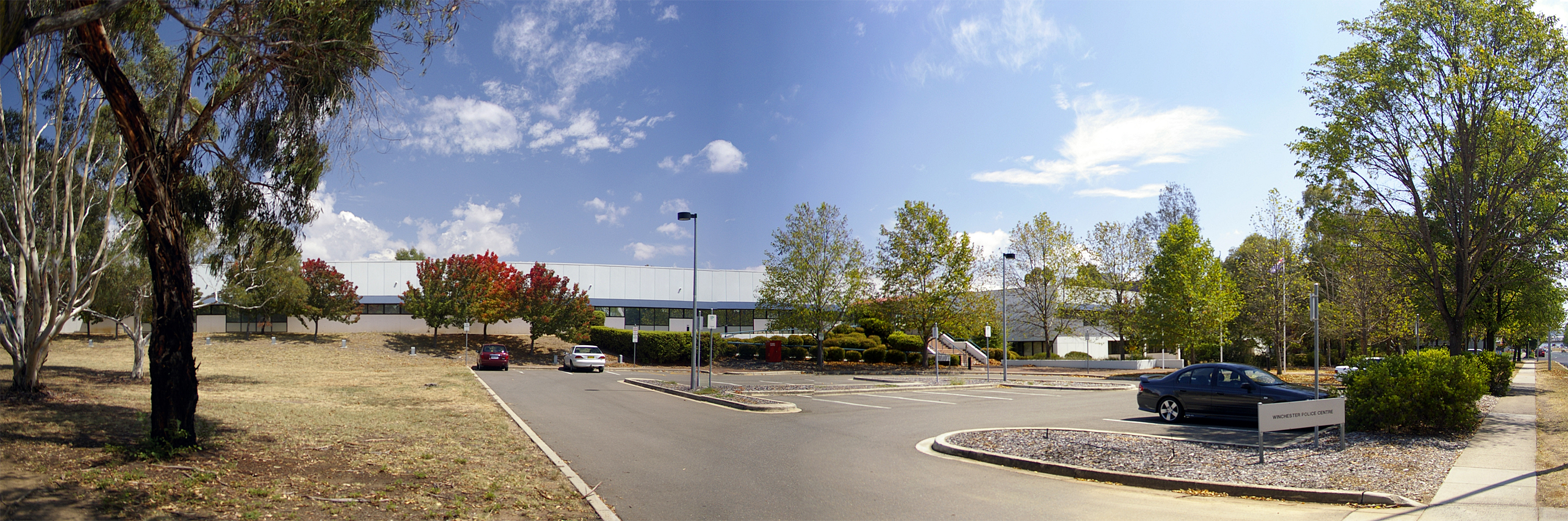
Winchester Police Centre in Belconnen

ACT Policing consists of five police stations (patrols) located in the Canberra town centres of Belconnen, City (Civic), Woden, Tuggeranong and Gungahlin Joint Emergency Service Centre. Police Constables based at these stations provide general duties community policing for the ACT. Uniformed Road Policing members work from the Road Policing Centre in Hume which opened in June 2023 and primarily focus on road safety and traffic law enforcement within the ACT.

The Winchester Police Centre, Benjamin Way, Belconnen, is the ACT Policing Headquarters. The Complex houses ACT Policing's Executive, administrative and support sections and elements of the Criminal Investigations area (CI).

The complex is named in memory of the former Assistant Commissioner Colin Winchester APM, the head of the then ACT Region (ACT Policing) of the AFP. Assistant Commissioner Winchester was murdered outside his house in early 1989.

=== Major specialist units ===
Criminal Investigations (CI) provides a detective function for the ACT, and is located at each of the main police stations (being Tuggeranong, Gungahlin, Woden, Belconnen and City) and the Winchester Police Centre.

AFP Specialist Protective Command provide a full-time tactical response capability, through the Tactical Response Team, in addition to search and rescue, public order management (riot control), police dogs and bomb response functions.

== Rank and structure ==
As distinct from the majority of AFP Members engaged in duties outside of ACT Policing, who under AFP Commissioner's Order 1 (Administration), are titled Federal Agents, police Members of ACT Policing (and some other AFP portfolios) adopt traditional ranks:

- Constable
- First Constable
- Senior Constable
- Leading Senior Constable
- Sergeant
- Inspector (Officer in Charge)
- Superintendent
- Commander
- Assistant Commissioner (Deputy Chief Police Officer of the Australian Capital Territory)
- Deputy Commissioner (Chief Police Officer of the Australian Capital Territory)

Those who have sufficient experience and have demonstrated the appropriate competencies are designated as a Detective.

== Chief police officers ==
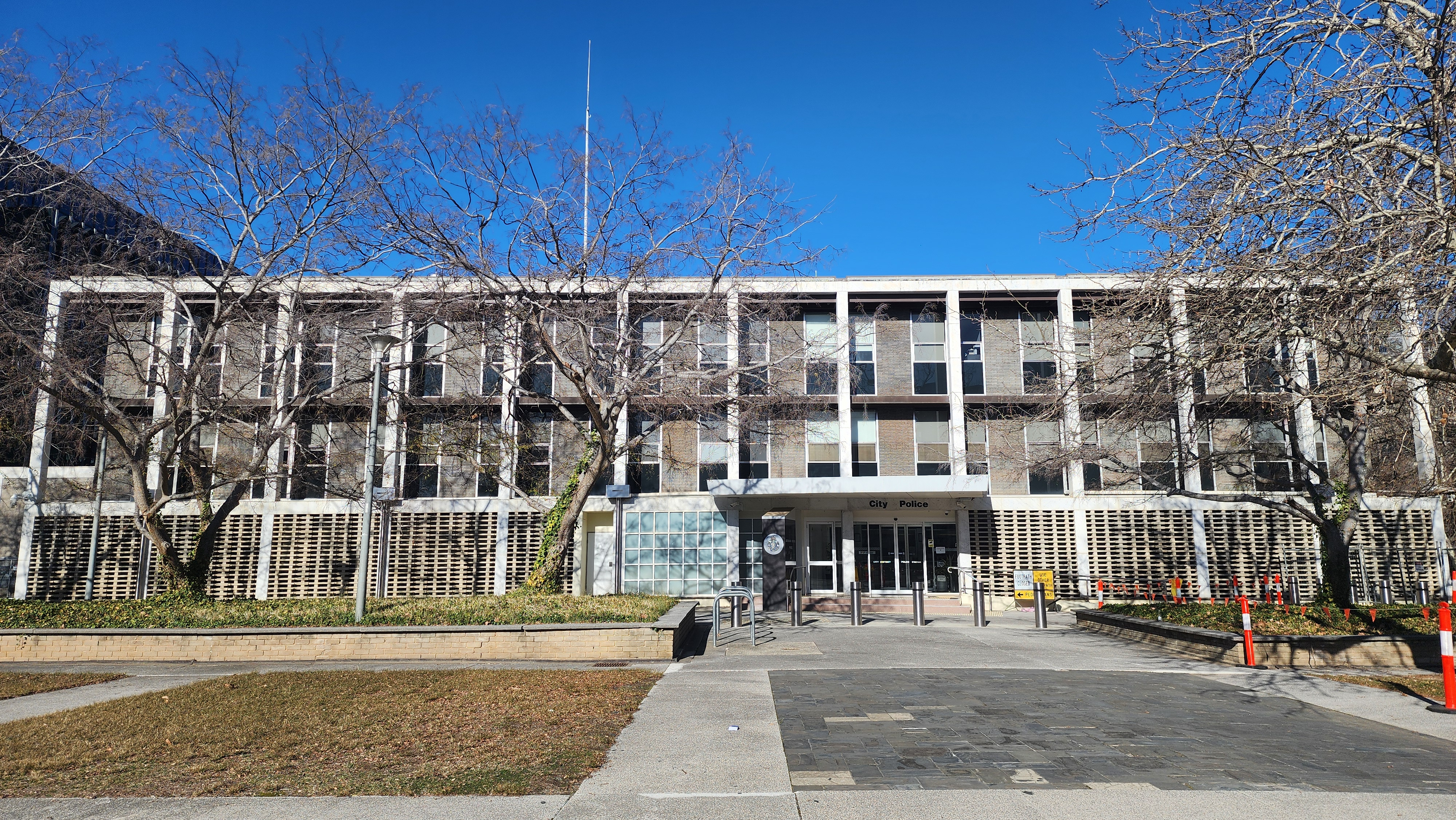
Canberra City Police Station

The title 'Chief Officer' was first used by Lieutenant Colonel Harold Edward Jones from 1927 until his retirement in 1943. During his tenure, Jones also held the positions of Director of the Commonwealth Investigation Bureau and the Superintendent of the Peace Officer Guard. Jones' successor, Robert Reid, was appointed solely to head the ACT Police Force. Subsequent commanders of the ACT Police Force used the title Commissioner until the force was amalgamated with the Commonwealth Police in 1979 to form the AFP.

Rank	Name	Post-nominals	Term began	Term ended
Chief Officer of the ACT Police Force
Chief Officer	Harold Edward Jones	OBE	1927	1943
Chief Officer	Robert Reid		1943	1955
Commissioner	Edward 'Ted' Richards	LVO	1955	1966
Commissioner	Leonard 'Len' Powley		1966	1966
Commissioner	Roy Wilson	MVO, QPM	1966	1977
Commissioner	Reginald 'Reg' Kennedy	QPM	1977	1979
AFP Assistant Commissioner for the ACT
Assistant Commissioner	Alan Watt		1979	1982
Assistant Commissioner	Val McConaghy		1982	1987
Assistant Commissioner	Colin Winchester	APM	1987	1989
Assistant Commissioner	Brian Bates	APM	1989	1989
Chief Police Officer of ACT Policing
Assistant Commissioner	Brian Bates	APM	1989	1992
Assistant Commissioner	Peter Dawson	APM	1992	1995
Commissioner	Michael Palmer	AO, APM	1995	1999
Assistant Commissioner	William Stoll	APM	1999	2000
Deputy Commissioner	John Murray	APM	2000	2004
Deputy Commissioner	John Davies	APM, OAM	2004	2005
Assistant Commissioner	Audrey Fagan	APM	2005	2007
Assistant Commissioner	Michael Phelan	APM	2007	2010
Assistant Commissioner	Roman Quaedvlieg	APM	2010	2013
Assistant Commissioner	Rudi Lammers	APM	2013	2016
Assistant Commissioner	Justine Saunders	APM	2016	2018
Assistant Commissioner	Ray Johnson	APM	2018	29 April 2020
Deputy Commissioner	Neil Gaughan	APM	29 April 2020	28 March 2024
Deputy Commissioner	Scott Lee	APM	28 March 2024	Incumbent

During Assistant Commissioner Bates' tenure, at the time of ACT self-government commencement in 1989, the title Chief Police Officer was resumed to denote the head of ACT Policing. Whilst remaining within the AFP command structure, the CPO also became accountable to the ACT Government for policing outcomes in the ACT.

In 2001, the position and title of Deputy Chief Police Officer was created. The first incumbent, between 2001 and 2002, was Assistant Commissioner Denis McDermott APM, followed by Assistant Commissioner Andrew Hughes APM between 2002 and 2003. Assistant Commissioner Hughes performed the duties of the Chief Police Officer for most of the period between the death of Assistant Commissioner Fagan APM and the appointment of Assistant Commissioner Phelan APM in 2007.

Between 2003 and July 2021, the title of Deputy Chief Police Officer has been used by both Commander rank deputies of the ACT Policing Executive. The position of Deputy Chief Police Officer is now held by an Assistant Commissioner.

== Vehicles ==
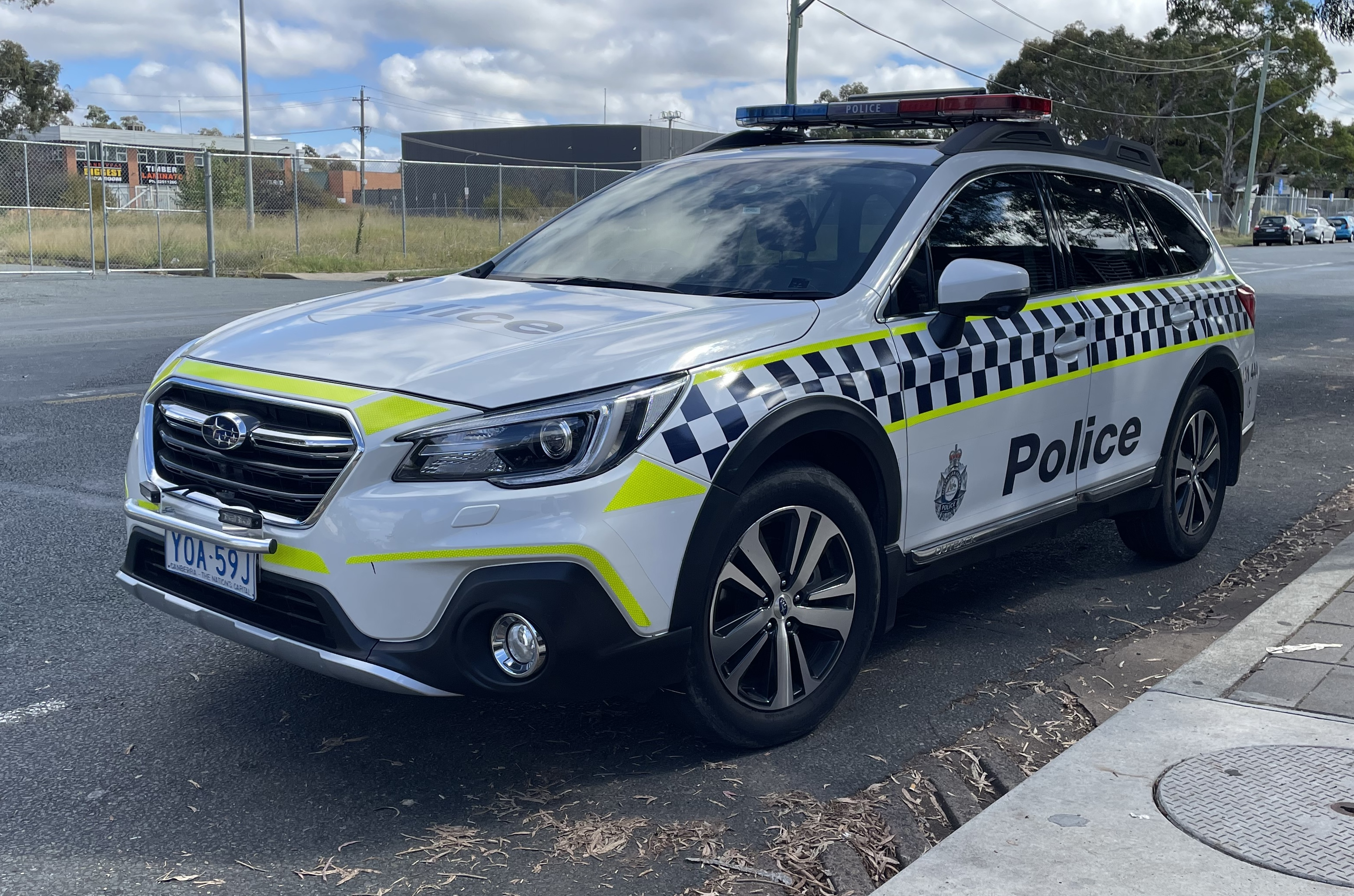
Subaru Outback

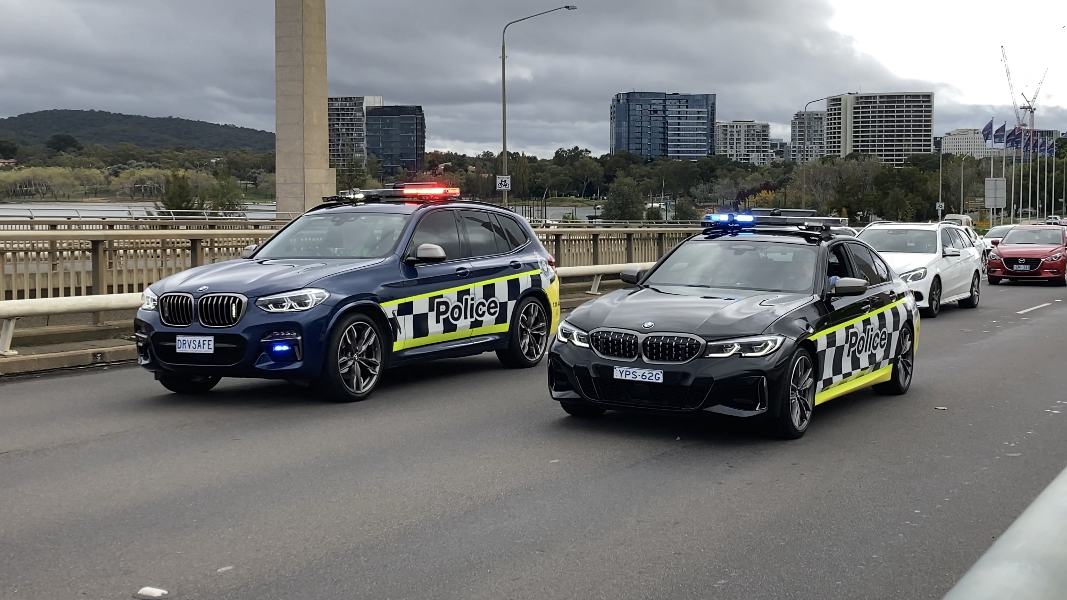
BMW X3, BMW 3 Series

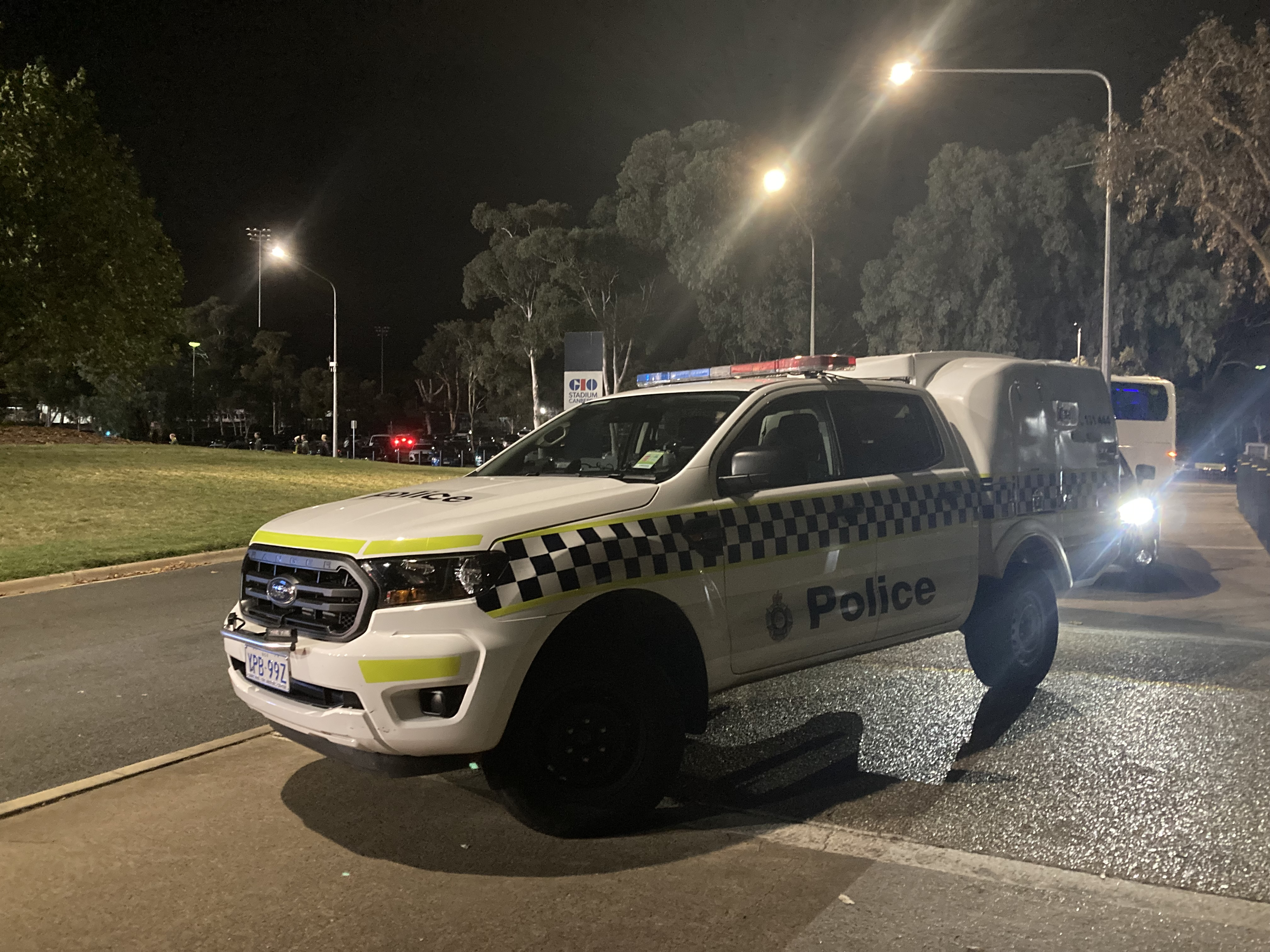
Ford Ranger

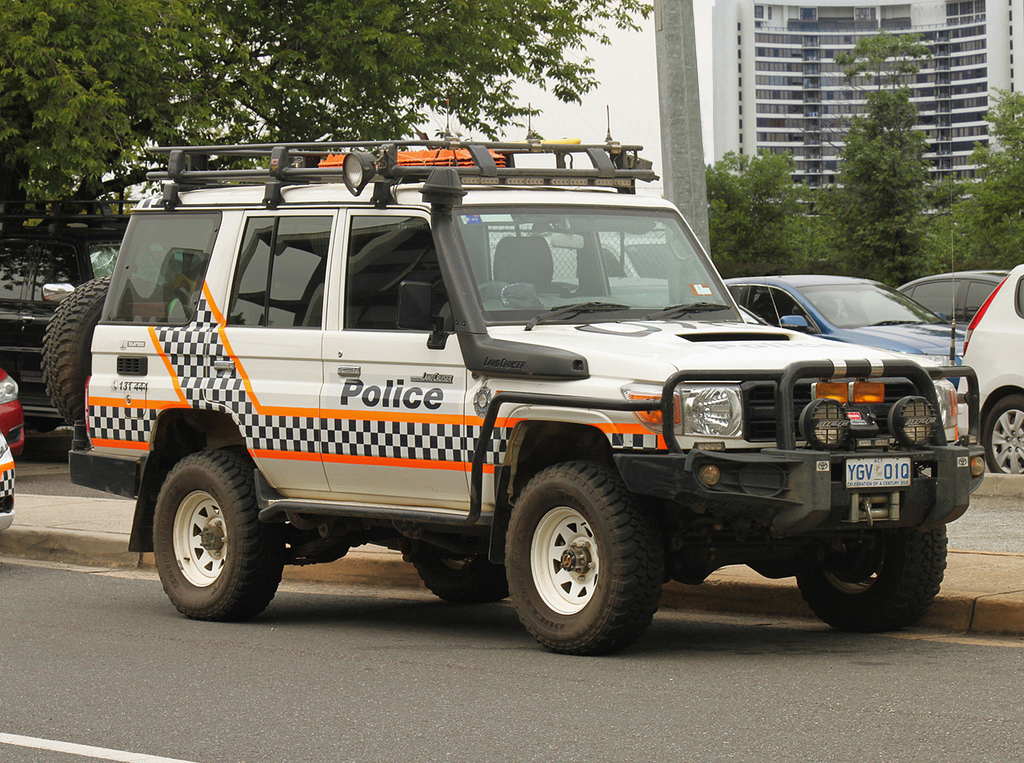
Toyota Landcruiser

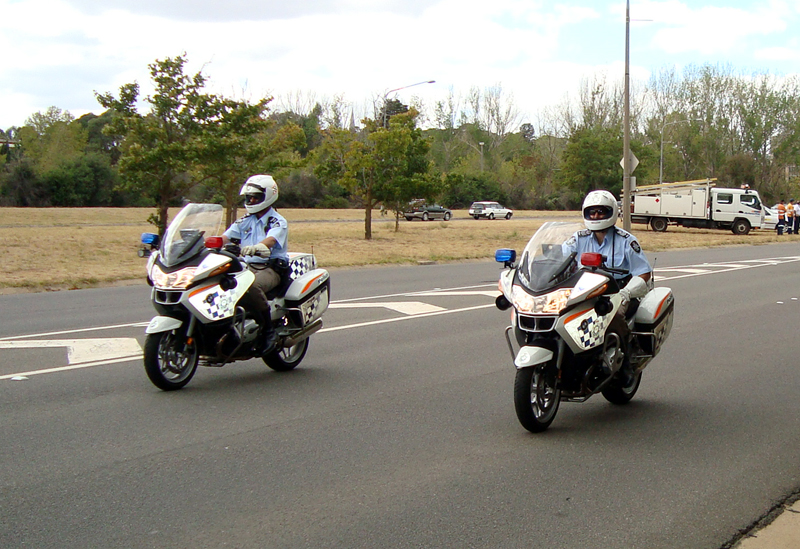
BMW R 1200 RT

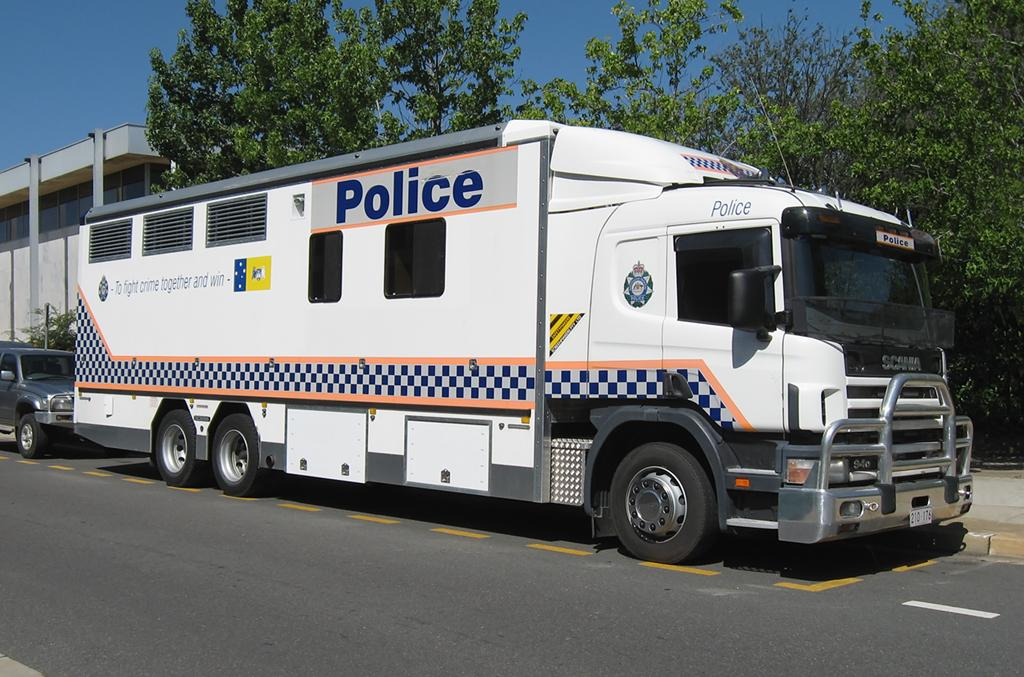
Scania P94

== See also ==
- ACT Corrective Services
