= Graham Perkin =

Australian journalist and newspaper editor

Edwin Graham Perkin (16 December 1929 – 16 October 1975) was an Australian journalist and newspaper editor.

== Early life ==
Perkin was born at Hopetoun, Victoria, elder son of Herbert Edwin Perkin, baker, and his wife Iris Lily, née Graham, both Victorian born. Graham grew up at Warracknabeal and was educated at the local high school. In 1948 he began to study law at the University of Melbourne, but abandoned his course in the following year when he obtained a cadetship with The Age. On 6 September 1952 he married Peggy Lorraine Corrie at the Methodist Church, St Kilda.

== Career ==
As a young reporter, Perkin rapidly acquired a reputation for enthusiasm and restless energy. In 1955 he won a Kemsley scholarship in journalism which took him to London. Returning to Australia as a feature writer, he shared the Walkley Award for journalism in 1959 for an article on pioneering heart surgery. His rise in the newspaper hierarchy was rapid: he became deputy news editor in 1959, news editor in 1963, assistant-editor in 1964 and editor (at the age of 36) in 1966. He was appointed to the additional post of editor-in-chief in 1973.

Perkin turned The Age into a more interventionist and campaigning newspaper. It exposed financial scandals in State governments and corruption in the police force, and attacked Federal governments for suppressing information. In the process, it attracted critics who thought it too 'leftist'. In 1972 The Age, which had traditionally supported Coalition governments, advocated the election of Gough Whitlam's Australian Labor Party. When that government was forced to an early election in 1974, Perkin wanted to support Whitlam again. His stand led to a conflict with the board of David Syme & Co. Ltd, owner and publisher of The Age. A compromise, supported by the managing director Ranald Macdonald, narrowly averted Perkin's resignation. It also reinforced his insistence on editorial independence, subject to the management's right to dismiss an editor in whom it had lost confidence.

However, Perkin turned violently on Whitlam a year later when he published details of a murky land deal involving Phillip Cairns, the son of Deputy Prime Minister Jim Cairns, and Rex Connor, the Minister for Minerals and Energy. Perkin had won a bidding war for the information, setting aside his normal opposition to buying stories because he felt the story was one of overwhelming importance. Perkin's editorials grew more and more critical of Whitlam, culminating in the elemental editorial "Go now, go decently" in which he called for the government to step down. It began with the words 'We will say it straight, and clear, and at once. The Whitlam Government has run its course.' Perkin died of a heart attack on 16 October 1975 at his Hampton home. He was 45.

Under Perkin, The Age became a more substantial, wider ranging, better written and significantly more influential newspaper. His reforms and his willingness to speak out strongly in defence of the paper's policies boosted circulation from a stagnant 180,000 in 1965 to a solid 222,000 ten years later. The company's revenues rose correspondingly. Perkin was also director (from 1966) of Australian Associated Press, its chairman in 1970-72, and a director of Reuters Ltd, London, in 1971-74.

== Personal life ==
His wife, their son Steve, and their daughter Corrie – both journalists – survived him. Peggy later remarried, and died in 2012, aged 81.

== Graham Perkin Journalism Award ==
The Graham Perkin Australian Journalist of the Year Award, an annual prize, was established in 1976.

== Bibliography ==
- Hills, Ben, Breaking News: The Golden Age of Graham Perkin, Scribe, 2010. ISBN 978-1-921640-37-7
