= Enid (given name) =

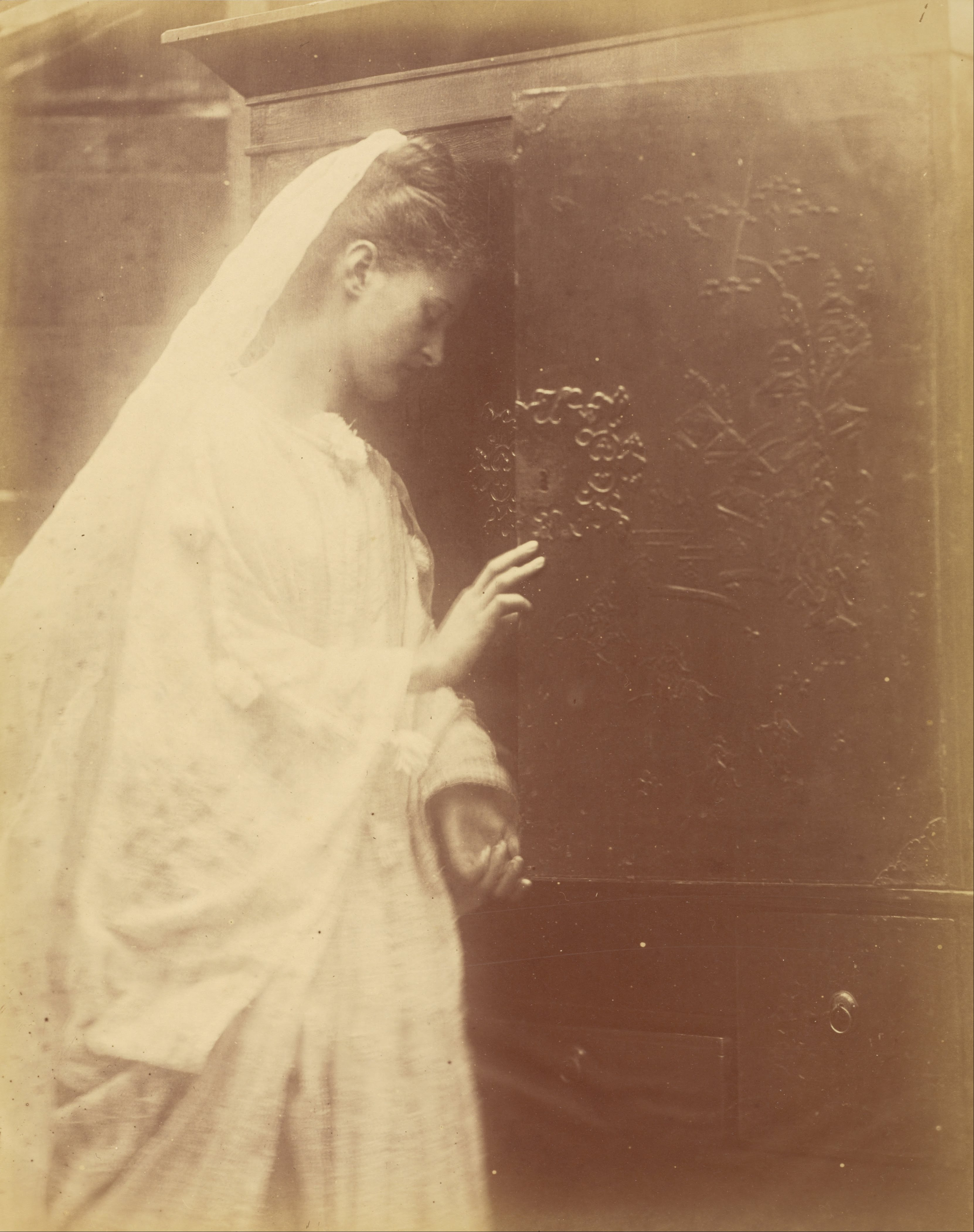
- Julia Margaret Cameron, Enid, 1874: portrait of the legendary figure as depicted in Tennyson
- Gender: Feminine

Origin
- Origin: cognate with the Welsh word enaid meaning "soul, life" (earlier eneid, eneit)
- Meaning: "purity" or "soul"

Other names
- Related names: Énide (French)

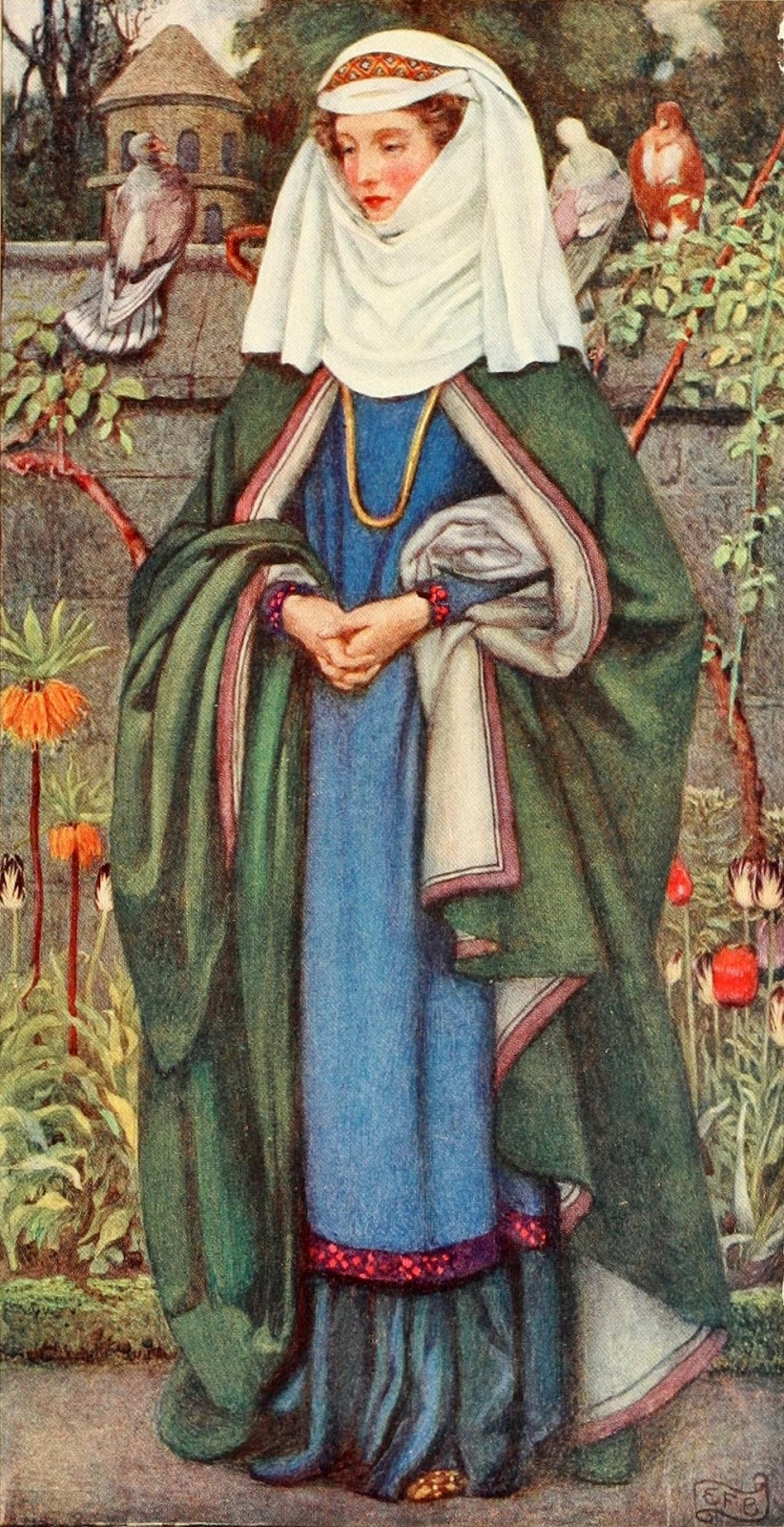
Enid by Eleanor Fortescue-Brickdale, 1913.

Enid (/ˈiːnɪd/ EE-nid; Welsh pronunciation: [ˈɛnɨ̞d]) is a feminine given name. Its origin is Middle Welsh eneit, meaning 'spirit; life; purity' (from Proto-Celtic *ana-ti̯o-, compare Gaulish anatia 'souls (?)' attested on the Larzac tablet, ultimately from the Proto-Indo-European root *h₂enh₁- 'to breathe, blow'; compare the modern Welsh word anadl 'breath; wind').

Enid was the Celtic goddess and Arthurian name of the 19th century following Alfred Lord Tennyson's Arthurian epic Idylls of the King (1859) and its medieval Welsh source, the Mabinogi tale of Geraint and Enid.

The popularity of Enid increased in Britain during the 1890s, becoming most popular in the 1920s. During that time, it became a compliment to be called a "second Enid", since the original was a legendary romantic figure of spotless perfection and courage in life. Enid was the quiet, brave, steadfast character of Tennyson's poem, loved deeply by many, yet her love or loyalty to her husband was unwavering, even at his worst.

== People ==
- Enid Bagnold (1889–1981), British author and playwright
- Enid Bakewell (born 1940), English cricketer
- Enid Bennett (1893–1969), Australian-born American silent film actress
- Enid Bishop (born 1925), Australian librarian
- Enid Blyton (1897–1968), British children's writer
- Enid Borden, American founder, president and CEO of the National Foundation to End Senior Hunger
- Enid Bosworth Lorimer (1887–1982), Australian actress and director
- Enid Campbell (1932–2010), Australian legal scholar and law professor
- Enid Charles (1894–1972), British socialist, feminist and statistician
- Enid Crow (born 1968), American feminist artist
- Enid Dame (1943–2003), American poet
- Enid Derham (1882–1941), Australian poet and academic
- Enid Evans (1914–2011), New Zealand librarian
- Enid Gilchrist, Australian fashion designer
- Enid Greene Mickelsen (born 1958), American politician
- Enid Greene (born 1958), American politician
- Enid Hattersley (1904–2001), British politician
- Enid A. Haupt (1906–2005), American publisher and philanthropist
- Enid Hibbard (1889–1960), American screenwriter
- Enid Johnson Macleod (1909–2001), Canadian anaesthetist, medical doctor and academic
- Enid Kent (born 1945), American former television actress
- Enid Kent, played Nurse Bigelow, a recurring character in the television series M*A*S*H
- Enid Lakeman (1903–1995), British political reformer, writer and politician
- Enid Lapthorn (1889–1967), British politician
- Enid Legros-Wise (born 1943), Canadian ceramic artist
- Enid Luff (1935–2022), Welsh musician
- Enid Lyons (1897–1981), Australian politician and wife of Prime Minister Joseph Lyons
- Enid MacRobbie (born 1931), Scottish plant scientist
- Enid Mark (1932–2008), American editor and publisher
- Enid Markey (1894–1981), American actress
- Enid Marx (1902–1998), English painter and designer
- Enid Michael (1883–1966), American ranger-naturalist
- Enid Morgan, Welsh former international lawn and indoor bowls competitor
- Enid Mumford (1924–2006), British professor largely known for her work on human factors and socio-technical systems
- Enid Nemy (born 1924), Canadian-born American reporter (The New York Times) and columnist
- Enid Riddell (1903–1980), British socialite and racing driver
- Enid Diana Elizabeth Rigg (1938–2020), known professionally as Dame Diana Rigg, British actress
- Enid Shomer, American poet
- Enid Stacy (1868–1903), English socialist activist
- Enid Stamp Taylor (1904–1946), English actress
- Enid Starkie (1897–1970), Irish literary critic
- Enid Szánthó (1907–1997), Hungarian opera singer
- Enid Tahirović (born 1972), Bosnian handball goalkeeper
- Enid Tapsell (1903–1975), New Zealander nurse, community leader, writer and local politician
- Enid Wyn Jones (1909–1967), Welsh nurse
- Enid Yandell (1870–1934), American sculptor
- Enid Egers (born 1965), Canadian waitress, inspiration Barenaked Ladies song "Enid"

== Fictional characters ==
- Enid Loopner, a character on Saturday Night Live portrayed by Jane Curtin”
- Enid Mettle, a character in OK K.O.! Let's Be Heroes
- Enid, a character in The Walking Dead
- Enid or "Enide" (an Old French variant of Enid), a heroine in Arthurian legends
- Enid, great-aunt of Neville Longbottom from J. K. Rowling's Harry Potter series
- Enid, a cat who lives at the Squirrel Club in Hey Duggee
- Enid Coleslaw, the lead character of the 1997 comic book Ghost World and its 2001 film adaptation
- Tracy Enid Flick, character in the 1998 novel Election and 1999 film portrayed by Reese Witherspoon
- Enid Frick, editor of Vogue magazine on TV's Sex and the City
- Enid Wexler, a feminist law student in the movie Legally Blonde (2001)
- Enid Kelso, character in TV's Scrubs
- Enid Nightshade, a character in The Worst Witch series of children's books
- Enid Rollins, a best friend of twin in the Sweet Valley High and Sweet Valley University book series and TV show.
- Enid Sinclair, a supporting eccentric werewolf character in Wednesday
- Enid Winterton (née Turner) a former lady's maid, now a member of high society in The Gilded Age (TV series)

== Places ==
- Enid, city in Oklahoma
- Enid Lake, lake in Mississippi
- Enid Lake, small lake in Oregon on Mount Hood, popular with snowshoers
