= Tapsell =

Tapsell may refer to:

== Surname ==
- Phillip Tapsell (1777–1873), born Hans Homan Jensen Falk, Danish mariner, whaler, and trader who settled in New Zealand
- Enid Marguerite Hamilton Tapsell (1903–1975), New Zealand nurse, community leader, writer, local politician
- Wally Tapsell (1904–1938), British communist activist, leading figure in the British Battalion during the Spanish Civil War
- Carlyle Tapsell (1909–1975), Indian field hockey player and twice Olympic competitor
- Peter Tapsell (British politician) (1930–2018), Conservative Party politician, former Member of Parliament
- Peter Tapsell (New Zealand politician) (1930–2012), Speaker of the New Zealand House of Representatives
- R. F. Tapsell (1936–1984), English author of historical novels, editor of a book on royal family dynasties
- Miranda Tapsell (born 1987), Indigenous Australian actress of both stage and screen
- Tania Tapsell, New Zealand politician

== Places ==
- Tapsell Foreland, snow-covered foreland jutting into the sea between Yule Bay and Smith Inlet, northern Victoria Land
