= Chamalières tablet =

Gaulish tablet found in Puy-de-Dôme, France

- Picture by Camille Besse (Bargoin Museum)
- Material: Lead
- Size: 40 mm × 60 mm (1.6 in × 2.4 in)
- Writing: Roman cursive
- Created: between 50 BC and 50 AD
- Discovered: 1971; Chamalières, Puy-de-Dôme, France
- Present location: Bargoin Museum

The Chamalières tablet (French: Plomb de Chamalières) is a lead tablet, six by four centimeters, that was discovered in 1971 in Chamalières, France, at the Source des Roches excavation. The tablet is dated somewhere between 50 BC and 50 AD. The text is written in the Gaulish language, with cursive Latin letters. With 396 letters grouped in 47 words, it is the third-longest extant text in Gaulish (the curse tablet from L'Hospitalet-du-Larzac and the Coligny calendar being longer), giving it great importance in the study of this language.

The magical subject matter of the text suggests it should be considered a defixiones (curse) tablet. However, given that it was found at a spa, and that it was accompanied by carvings of bodies and body parts, Meid considers the text to be a prayer by old men for healing their various ailments.

== Text ==
andedion uediiumi dijiuion ri sun
artiu mapon aruerriiatin
lopites snieꟈꟈdic sos brixtia anderon
clucion floron nigrinon adgarion aemili
on paterin claudion legitumon caelion
pelign claudío pelign marcion uictorin asiatI
con aꟈꟈedilli etic secoui toncnaman
toncsiiontío meion ponc sesit bue
tid ollon reguccambion exsops
pissiiumi tsoccaanti rissu ison son
bissiet lugedessummiiis luge
dessumíis lugedessumiis luxe

It seems to begin:

"I beseech (uediIumi) before the power (ri sunartiu) of the infernal gods (andedion...diIiuion) [the Celtic deity] Maponos (mapon probably with the epithet Arverriiatin perhaps "of the Averni [tribe]").

Then probably:

"Hurry (lopites) and bind (snI-eððdic?) those men [listed] below (sos ... anderon) with magic (brixtia)."

But Colera interprets the sequence ri sun/artiu as an instrumental noun phrase: "by means of a magic script"; and brixtia anderon as "by the magic of the subterraneans." These interpretations would connect anderon with Latin inferus and Sanskrit adhara- “nether”, from Proto-Indo-European *nd^{h}eros. But another hypothesis is that anderon is related to Irish ainder "(young) woman," so "the magic of women," recalling the passage in the Old Irish Lorica asking for protection “against the spells of women, smiths and druids”: fri brichta ban ocus gobann ocus druad.

The following three lines seem to comprise the list of names of those to be cursed (or healed). It concludes with the thrice repeated incantation luge-dessumíis "serving (the god) Lug", which is paralleled in an Old Irish inscription written in Ogam script, LUGU-DECCAS. Mees, however, interprets these as meaning, "I prepare them for being possessed (or committed)."

Pierre-Yves Lambert, in his book La langue gauloise, offers an analysis.

=== Notes ===
The form uediiumi in the first line is probably "I pray, beseech" from Proto-Celtic *g^{w}ed-iū- < Proto-Indo-European *g^{wh}ed^{h}-iō-.

In line 4, ad-garion may refer to a "speaker" for the men listed, if related to Old Irish gairid "he calls," perhaps a calque here of Latin ad-vōcātus.

In line 8, toncsiiontío may refer to a group, "(those) who will swear," if related to Old Irish tongid "he swears" (< PIE: *teh_{2}g- ‘touch’ > Lat. tango, Gr. te-tag-on ‘having seized’, Go. tekan ‘touch’, ToB cesam ‘touch’.

This seems to be followed by a triple set of oppositions:

meion, ponc sesit, buetid ollon
“Small, when sowed, shall become big”

regu ccambion
“I make straight (what is) crooked”

exops pissíiumi
“(though) deprived of eye-sight, I shall see”

In the tenth line, pissiiumi is probably from Proto-Celtic *k^{w}is-o- "see", here perhaps a future "I will see." This from PIE *k^{w}eys- "perceive." Cognates in Celtic include Gaulish ap-pisetu (Thiaucourt) and Old Irish ad-cí "see"; and further afield: Av. cinahmi "determine", Lat. cura "anxiety, care."

Hollifield takes the sequence ison son bissiet to possibly mean "him who might violate it," connecting bissiet with Old Irish bidbu "culprit." He also takes the form bue/tid in lines 7-8 to mean "whatever may be."

== In popular culture ==
The Swiss folk metal band Eluveitie used the text for their song Dessumiis Luge, and the first two verses for Spirit.

== See also ==
- Larzac tablet

== Bibliography ==
- Xavier Delamarre, Dictionnaire de la langue gauloise : une approche linguistique du vieux-celtique continental, Paris, Errance, 2018.
- Pierre-Yves Lambert, La langue gauloise : description linguistique, commentaire d'inscriptions choisies, Éditions Errance, 2018.
- Garrett S. Olmsted, The Gods of the Celts and the Indo-Europeans, Innsbrucker Beitrage, 1994.
- Venceslas Kruta, Les Celtes. Histoire et dictionnaire, Paris, Laffont, 2000.
- Henry, Patrick L. (1984). "Interpreting the Gaulish inscription of Chamalières". Études celtiques. 21 (1): 141–150. doi:10.3406/ecelt.1984.1761.
- Fleuriot, Léon (1977). "Le vocabulaire de l'inscription gauloise de Chamalières". Études celtiques. 15 (1): 173–190. doi:10.3406/ecelt.1976.1570.
