= Enid =

Enid may refer to:

== Places ==
- Enid, Mississippi, an unincorporated community
- Enid, Oklahoma, a city
- 13436 Enid, an asteroid
- Enid Lake, Mississippi

== Given name ==
- Enid (given name), a Welsh female given name and a list of people and fictional characters so named

== Arts, entertainment, and media ==
- Enid (film), a 2009 TV film about Enid Blyton, starring Helena Bonham Carter
- "Enid" (song) (1992), by the Canadian group Barenaked Ladies
- The Enid, a British rock band founded in 1973

== Other uses ==
- Enid High School, a public secondary school in Enid, Oklahoma

ENID refers to

- European Network of Indicator Designers
