= List of ordinances of the Australian Capital Territory from 1932 =

This is a list of ordinances enacted by the Governor-General of Australia for the Territory for the Seat of Government (Australian Capital Territory) for the year 1932.

== 1932 ==
Short title, or popular name	Citation	Notified
Long title
Motor Traffic Ordinance 1932 (repealed)	No. 1 of 1932	28 January 1932
An Ordinance to provide for the Registration of Motor Vehicles and the Regulation of Motor Traffic. (Repealed by Motor Traffic Ordinance 1936 (No. 45))
Auctioneers Ordinance 1932 (repealed)	No. 2 of 1932	28 January 1932
An Ordinance to amend the Auctioneers' Ordinance 1927. (Note: Auctioneers Ordinance 1927 (No. 2)) (Repealed by Auctioneers Ordinance 1959 (No. 2))
City of Canberra Arms Ordinance 1932 or the City of Canberra Arms Act 1932	No. 3 of 1932	11 February 1932
An Ordinance for the Protection of the Arms of the City of Canberra.
Canberra University College Ordinance 1932 (repealed)	No. 4 of 1932	11 February 1932
An Ordinance to amend the Canberra University College Ordinance 1929. (Note: Canberra University College Ordinance 1929 (No. 20)) (Repealed by Canberra University College Ordinance 1953 (No. 8))
Dentists Registration Ordinance 1932 or the Dentists Registration Act 1932 (repealed)	No. 5 of 1932	18 February 1932
An Ordinance to amend the Dentists Registration Ordinance 1931. (Note: Dentists Registration Ordinance 1931 (No. 8)) (Repealed by Statute Law Amendment Act 2000 (No. 80))
Church Lands Leases Ordinance 1932 or the Church Lands Leases Act 1932 (repealed)	No. 6 of 1932	25 February 1932
An Ordinance to amend the Church Lands Leases Ordinance 1924-1930. (Note: Church Lands Leases Ordinance 1924 (No. 10)) (Repealed by Land (Planning and Environment) (Consequential Provisions) Act 1991 (No. 118))
Leases (Special Purposes) Ordinance 1932 or the Leases (Special Purposes) Act 1932 (repealed)	No. 7 of 1932	25 February 1932
An Ordinance to amend the Leases (Special Purposes) Ordinance 1925-1930. (Note: Leases (Special Purposes) Ordinance 1925 (No. 11)) (Repealed by Land (Planning and Environment) (Consequential Provisions) Act 1991 (No. 118))
Industrial Board Ordinance 1932 (repealed)	No. 8 of 1932	24 February 1932
An Ordinance to amend the Industrial Board Ordinance 1922-1928. (Note: Industrial Board Ordinance 1922 (No. 2)) (Repealed by Industrial Board Ordinance 1936 (No. 12))
Liquor Ordinance 1932 (repealed)	No. 9 of 1932	10 March 1932
An Ordinance to amend the Liquor Ordinance 1929-1931. (Note: Liquor Ordinance 1929 (No. 15)) (Repealed by Liquor Ordinance 1975 (No. 19))
Trustee Ordinance 1932 (repealed)	No. 10 of 1932	7 April 1932
An Ordinance to amend the Trustee Act 1898, (Note: Trustee Act 1898 (No. 4 (NSW))) of the State of New South Wales, in its application to the Territory. (Repealed by Trustee Ordinance 1957 (No. 14))
Weights and Measures Ordinance 1932 or the Weights and Measures Act 1932 (repealed)	No. 11 of 1932	7 April 1932
An Ordinance to amend the Weights and Measures Ordinance 1929. (Note: Weights and Measures Ordinance 1929 (No. 9)) (Repealed by Trade Measurement (Amendment) Act 1995 (No. 5))
Industrial Board Ordinance (No. 2) 1932 (repealed)	No. 12 of 1932	28 April 1932
An Ordinance to amend the Industrial Board Ordinance 1922-1928, as amended by the Industrial Board Ordinance 1932. (Note: Industrial Board Ordinance 1932 (No. 8)) (Repealed by Industrial Board Ordinance 1936 (No. 12))
Administration and Probate Ordinance 1932 or the Administration and Probate Act 1932 (repealed)	No. 13 of 1932	28 April 1932
An Ordinance to amend the Administration and Probate Ordinance 1929-1930. (Note: Administration and Probate Ordinance 1929 (No. 18)) (Repealed by Statute Law Amendment Act 2000 (No. 80))
Advisory Council Ordinance 1932 (repealed)	No. 14 of 1932	12 May 1932
An Ordinance to amend the Advisory Council Ordinance 1930-1931. (Note: Advisory Council Ordinance 1930 (No. 4)) (Repealed by Advisory Council Ordinance 1936 (No. 49))
Liquor Ordinance (No. 2) 1932 (repealed)	No. 15 of 1932	23 June 1932
An Ordinance to amend the Liquor Ordinance 1929-1931, as amended by the Liquor Ordinance 1932. (Note: Liquor Ordinance 1932 (No. 9)) (Repealed by Liquor Ordinance 1975 (No. 19))
Deserted Wives and Children Ordinance 1932 (repealed)	No. 16 of 1932	4 August 1932
An Ordinance to amend the Deserted Wives and Children Act, 1901, (Note: Deserted Wives and Children Act 1901 (No. 17 (NSW))) of the State of New South Wales, in its application to the Territory. (Repealed by Maintenance Ordinance 1968 (No. 20))
Dentists Registration Ordinance (No. 2) 1932 or the Dentists Registration Act 1932 (repealed)	No. 17 of 1932	4 August 1932
An Ordinance to amend the Dentists Registration Ordinances 1931, as amended by the Dentists Registration Ordinance 1932. (Note: Dentists Registration Ordinance 1932 (No. 5)) (Repealed by Statute Law Amendment Act 2000 (No. 80))
Police Ordinance 1932 or the Police Act 1932 (repealed)	No. 18 of 1932	18 August 1932
An Ordinance to amend the Police Ordinance 1927-1930. (Note: Police Ordinance 1927 (No. 19)) (Repealed by Crimes (Amendment) Act (No. 2) 1994 (No. 75))
Companies Ordinance 1932 (repealed)	No. 19 of 1932	24 August 1932
An Ordinance to amend the Companies Ordinance 1931. (Note: Companies Ordinance 1931 (No. 25)) (Repealed by Companies Ordinance 1954 (No. 14))
Trespass on Commonwealth Lands Ordinance 1932 or the Trespass on Territory Land Ordinance 1932 or the Trespass on Territory Land Act 1932	No. 20 of 1932	10 November 1932
An Ordinance relating to Trespass on Lands belonging to, or in the occupation of, the Commonwealth within the Territory.
Court of Petty Sessions Ordinance 1932 or the Court of Petty Sessions Act 1932 (repealed)	No. 21 of 1932	17 November 1932
An Ordinance to amend the Court of Petty Sessions Ordinance (No. 2) 1930. (Note: Court of Petty Sessions Ordinance (No. 2) 1930 (No. 21)) (Repealed by Statute Law Amendment Act 2000 (No. 80))
Matrimonial Causes Ordinance 1932 (repealed)	No. 22 of 1932	24 November 1932
An Ordinance relating to Matrimonial Causes. (Repealed by Ordinances Revision Ordinance 1977 (No. 65))
Sheriff Ordinance 1932 (repealed)	No. 23 of 1932	1 December 1932
An Ordinance to provide for the appointment of a Sheriff. (Repealed by Sheriff Ordinance Repeal Ordinance 1934 (No. 1))
Coroners Ordinance 1932 (repealed)	No. 24 of 1932	1 December 1932
An Ordinance relating to Coroners. (Repealed by Coroners Ordinance 1956 (No. 14))
Juries Ordinance 1932 (repealed)	No. 25 of 1932	1 December 1932
An Ordinance relating to Juries. (Repealed by Juries Ordinance 1967 (No. 47))
Juries Ordinance (No. 2) 1932 (repealed)	No. 26 of 1932	6 December 1932
An Ordinance to amend the Juries Ordinance 1932. (Note: Juries Ordinance 1932 (No. 25)) (Repealed by Juries Ordinance 1967 (No. 47))

== Sources ==
- "legislation.act.gov.au".
