= L'Hospitalet-du-Larzac =

Commune in Occitanie, France

- Commune
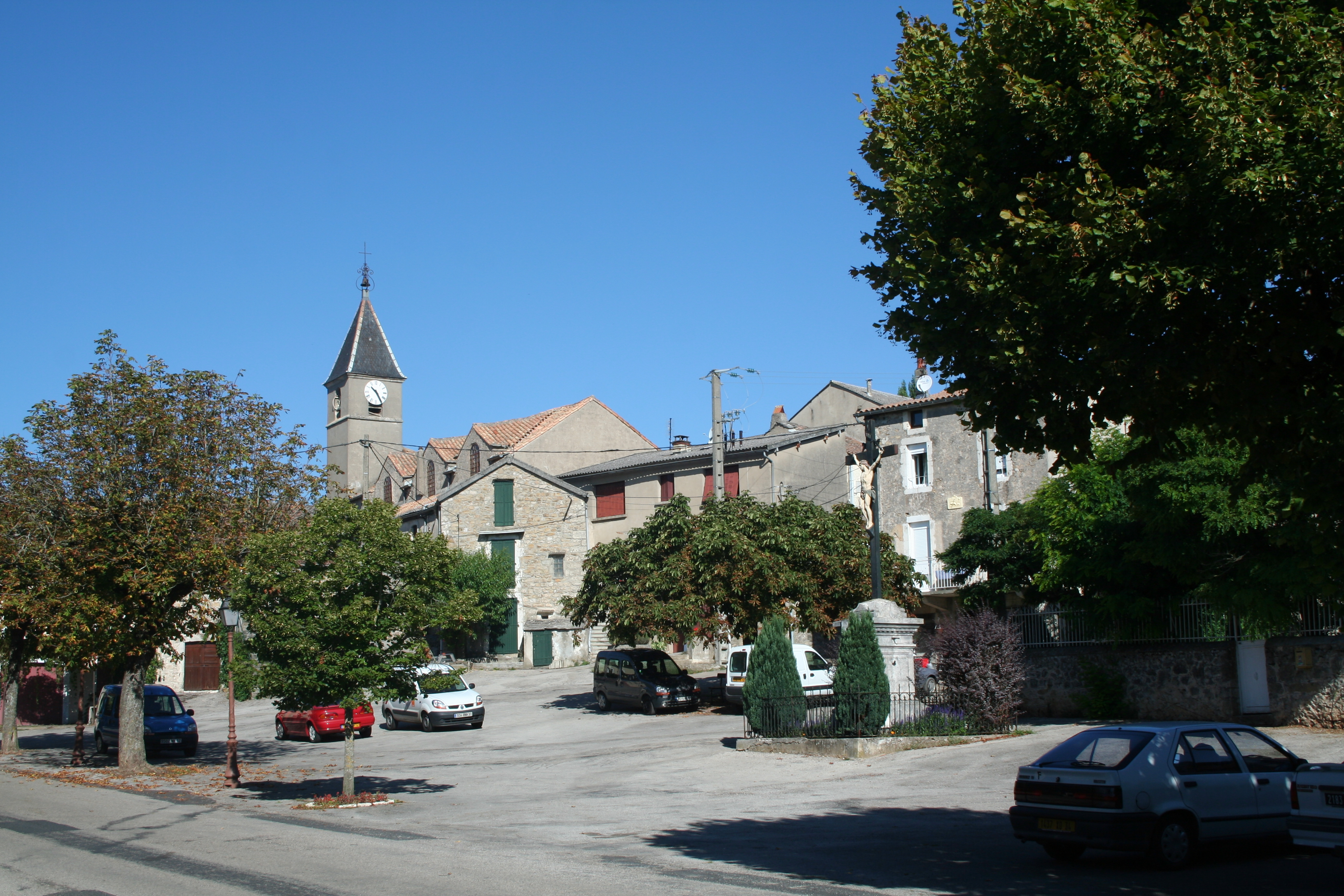
- The church and surrounding buildings in L'Hospitalet-du-Larzac

- Coat of arms
- Location of L'Hospitalet-du-Larzac
- Location within France Location within Occitanie
- Coordinates: 43°58′27″N 3°11′49″E
- Country: France
- Region: Occitania
- Department: Aveyron
- Arrondissement: Millau
- Canton: Causses-Rougiers

Government
  - Mayor (2020–2026): Thierry Cartayrade
- Area^{1}: 12.4 km^{2} (4.8 sq mi)
- Elevation: 730 m (2,400 ft)
- Highest elevation: 861 m (2,825 ft)
- Lowest elevation: 699 m (2,293 ft)
- Population (2023): 348
  - Density: 28.1/km^{2} (72.7/sq mi)
- Time zone: UTC+01:00 (CET)
  - Summer (DST): UTC+02:00 (CEST)
- INSEE/Postal code: 12115 /12230
- ^{1} French Land Register data, which excludes lakes, ponds, glaciers > 1 km^{2} (0.386 sq mi or 247 acres) and river estuaries.

L'Hospitalet-du-Larzac (French pronunciation: [lɔspitalɛ dy laʁzak]; Occitan: L'Espitalet de Larzac) is a commune in the Aveyron department in southern France, part of the southern Massif central, incorporating part of the Larzac plateau.

The economy is agricultural, notably dairy produce (Roquefort cheese), but also beef and mutton production, and rural tourism.

L'Hospitalet-du-Larzac is the site of discovery of one of the longest and most important inscriptions in the Gaulish language, a lead curse tablet (found in 1983).

The commune is named for a historical hospital founded by viscount Millau Gilbert (or Guibert) in 1108. It was owned by Cassan Abbey from 1174 to 1789. The parish church was at Saint-Étienne-du-Larzac, now ruined, in what is now part of Sainte-Eulalie-de-Cernon commune. The hospital was fortified in the early 15th century, after which the parish center was transferred there. The current parish church dates to 1764, presumably built on top of an older structure.

In 1807, the parish was enlarged, incorporating d’Egalières, du Sambuc, Trinquier and du Rouquet. The modern commune was formed in 1834, with the dissolution of the predecessor commune of La Cavalerie.

Historical population
Year	Pop.	±% p.a.
1968	218	—
1975	233	+0.96%
1982	247	+0.84%
1990	246	−0.05%
1999	249	+0.13%
2007	325	+3.39%
2012	310	−0.94%
2017	280	−2.02%
2023	348	+3.69%
Source: INSEE

== See also ==
- Communes of the Aveyron department
