= The Year of the Horsetails =

First edition

The Year of the Horsetails is a historical novel, written by R.F. Tapsell and published in 1967 by Hutchinson in the UK and by Alfred A. Knopf in the US, that is set on the Eurasian Steppe, probably in the area now known as Eastern Europe. The time frame of the book is not specified, but it is probably set between the birth of Attila the Hun in 406 AD, and the rise of the Mongol ruler Genghis Khan in 1162 AD. The story begins with the central character Bardiya, a Saka tribesman, escaping westward across the steppe on horseback from the brutal Mongol-like Tugar people. The fictional Tugars may have been modeled on the Avars (580-804 AD), a Turkic people who were a nomadic confederation also ruled by a Khagan (emperor).

== Plot summary ==
Bardiya had been a conscript soldier from the minority Saka people in the Tugar army as a light, mounted cavalryman but was sentenced to death for desertion. Bardiya fled the Tugars on horseback and encountered a sedentary and pastoral Slav people called the Drevich who assisted him in fighting off his former compatriots who had tracked him across the vast endless grasslands of the steppe. He decided to stay and live with them, quite possibly influenced by Marissa, a beautiful woman from the tribe. Bardiya warns the Drevich that the dreaded Tugars are campaigning towards their region and that they will be overrun unless they leave, or are determined to fight. Bardiya then trains the Drevich in the war techniques and methodologies of the Tugars and prepares them to defend their homeland. The final scenes comprise the battle between the fleeing Tugar leader and Bardiya, who earlier, by tactical ingenuity and discipline, managed to avoid have the Drevichi being beaten by the Tugars and inflicted a stinging defeat on the invaders.
