= Monarchs, Rulers, Dynasties and Kingdoms of the World =

1983 non-fiction work by R.F. Tapsell

- Title page for Monarchs, Rulers, Dynasties and Kingdoms of the World (1983)
- Author: R.F. Tapsell
- Language: English
- Genre: Non-fiction
- Publisher: Thomas and Hudson Ltd
- Publication date: 1983

Monarchs, Rulers, Dynasties and Kingdoms of the World: An Encyclopaedic Guide to More Than 13,000 Rulers and 1,000 Dynasties from 3000 BC to the 20th Century is a non-fiction work by R.F. Tapsell, published in 1983. It is a comprehensive record of kings, queens, sultans, and emperors all in a single volume. It includes many dynasties that are rarely described except in advanced studies of individual countries or regions. The relationship of each monarch to his or her predecessor is provided which enables the reader to construct a rudimentary family tree.

== Structure ==
The book begins with a bibliography arranged by author's name in alphabetical order, followed by a Guide to Dynasties and States, a 150-page section giving brief descriptions and indicating where the related list(s) can be found. It is a good reference for finding the main rulers of a particular part of the world at various times. Tapsell briefly describes some royal family ties and attempts to help the reader locate many of the early realms of the world using the modern map, providing some history on each country or province. Minor criticisms of the book center on the complicated nature of locating exactly what is sought.
