= The Unholy Pilgrim =

1968 novel by R.F. Tapsell

- North American first edition cover
- Author: R.F. Tapsell
- Language: English
- Genre: Historical novel, Adventure
- Publisher: Alfred A. Knopf
- Publication date: 1968
- Publication place: England
- Media type: Print (hardcover, paperback)
- Pages: 242
- ISBN: 978-0090871407

The Unholy Pilgrim is a historical novel, written by R.F. Tapsell and published in 1968, which is set in turbulent 13th-century Europe during the High Middle Ages, and follows the adventures of Tancred of Varville.

== Plot summary ==
Tancred of Varville is pilgrim without a scrap of piety, a young Norman knight, and an unhappy soldier of fortune. Tancred has been forced by King Louis IX of France to undertake a tedious pilgrimage as condition for the restoration of his family lands, now his reluctant journey to the Holy City of Jerusalem has taken an abrupt turn for the worse. He washes up on the shores of Frankish Greece, only to fall right into the hands of his former employer and worst enemy, Guy I de la Roche, Duke of Athens.

Tancred’s only hope of escaping summary execution lies with the Duke’s devious Venetian companion, Angelo Sanudo, Lord of Naxos (one of twelve Greek Islands in the Cyclades group), who seems to have a mysterious purpose in mind for an expendable mercenary knight of dubious reputation. Tancred makes an agreement with Sanudo to infiltrate the service of Verrano, the Genoese leader and a bitter enemy. After being taken in a prearranged naval battle, Tancred is fully accepted into Verrano's service, and working from within, secures Sanudo's victory.
