= Enid Gilchrist =

Australian fashion designer

Enid Beatrice Gilchrist OAM (died 17 October 2007, age 90) was an Australian fashion designer, who became well known for her numerous self-drafting sewing pattern books which were very popular in the 1950s to 1970s.

Enid studied dress design at Melbourne Technical College (now Royal Melbourne Institute of Technology) and during World War II worked as a dressmaker for a pattern firm. She worked with the Victorian Infant Welfare Department and the Kindergarten Union to produce a series of patterns for babies and young children. She later taught dress design at Footscray Technical College and the Emily Mcpherson College.

Enid began to make patterns using a pattern-drafting method. These patterns were published in The Argus from 1946 onward into the 1950s. They were also published in The News (Adelaide) in 1953. Her pattern drafting techniques were collected in books that were sold widely across Australia. The first editions sold out and they went into multiple printings. In the early 1950s she also lectured widely to suburban state school mothers clubs, church groups and Red Cross auxiliaries in Melbourne, featuring the clothes that she designed and using local children as models. She later joined New Idea magazine, where she published articles and patterns and produced sewing books showing clothes which people could make up from the pattern drafts.

In 1953 she was one of the judges of a competition for wool fashions with a parade of the finalists run by the Royal Melbourne Show.

While her books were published without dates, they can be grouped by reference to the decimalization of Australian currency in 1966, demonstrated by the price on the cover.

Earliest Publications

- No. 1 Clothes for Your Baby
- No. 2 Toddlers' Clothes
- No. 3 Pre-school Clothes (3-4 Years)
- No. 4 Betweens (4-6 Years)
- No. 5 Sixes and Sevens
- No. 6 Boys and Girls (8-10 Years)
- No. 7 Dresses for your Daughter

Publications before 1966

- Clothes for Your Children
- Baby Book
- Toddlers' Wardrobe
- Three to Six
- Play Clothes
- Little Coats and Dresses (0-6 Years)
- Six to Nine Years
- Suits and Dresses (5-12 Years)
- Boy and Girl Clothes
- Undies, Beach and Sleep Wear
- Junior Teens and Smaller Women
- Women and Teenagers
- Basic Fashion for Women
- Doll's Clothes

Publications Circa 1966

- Teenagers and Small Women
- Under Five Fashion
- 150 Fancy Dress Ideas
- Teen Dolls
- Pinnies and Things
- Sleep Wear and Undies
- 3 to 6
- Maternity Wear
- Casual Clothes (6-15 Years)

Publications Post 1966

- Seventy Styles from the Basic Pattern
- Fancy Dress
- Boys and Girls (5-9 Years)
- Over-20 Styles
- Girls' Gear (5-12 Years)
- Ten to Teens (10-15 Years)
- Kindergarten Set (3-6 Years)
- Home Maker Book
- Smocks and Maternity Wear
- Mix'n'Match: For Girls and Boys 5-9 Years

== Sources ==
- Enid Gilchrist (nd) Sewing is Simple with Enid Gilchrist: 29 Great Designs for Children: A New Idea Special Publication
- Enid Gilchrist (nd) Dresses for your Daughter: Enid Gilchrist Pattern Book No. 7
- Enid Gilchrist (nd, pre-1966) Six to Nine Years: Boy and Girl Clothes
- Enid Gilchrist (nd, circa 1966) Teenagers and Small Women
- Enid Gilchrist (nd, post-1966) Seventy Styles from the Basic Pattern: Bust Sizes 34-44
