= R. F. Tapsell =

R. F. (Robert Frederick) Tapsell was an English author born in 1936, in Croydon, Surrey (now South London). Tapsell wrote three historical novels and was the editor (compiler) of a single non-fiction book on royal family dynasties. During his National Service in the British Royal Air Force (RAF) he was trained as a Russian Language interpreter. Later, Tapsell worked in military intelligence, specializing in Eastern Europe. After demobilization he worked in an insurance company and as a shipping clerk, while preparing himself for college. In 1960 he began studying at the School of Slavonic and East European Studies at London University, graduating with a Bachelor of Arts (Hons) in History in 1963. In 1964 he married Shirley Joan Fussell at Walton, Stafford, England. He also traveled extensively in Western Europe, the Balkans, Egypt and Iraq, and described himself as a "jack of many foreign languages, master of none". Tapsell then moved into academic administration, working at several British universities, including the University of East Anglia in Norwich, England, before emigrating to Australia in 1974. He returned to the United Kingdom in 1982, where he died in April 1984. He was survived by his widow and two sons.

== Bibliography ==
- Monarchs, Rulers, Dynasties and Kingdoms of the World: An Encyclopaedic Guide to More Than 13,000 Rulers and 1,000 Dynasties from 3000 BC to the 20th Century (1983)
- Shadow of Wings (1972). A historical novel set around the rise of the Persian Empire. It starts with the career of Cyrus the Great, founder of the Persian Achaemenid Empire, but mainly deals with the rise to power of King of Kings Darius I (the Great).
- The Unholy Pilgrim (1968). A historical novel centered on Tancred of Varville, a Norman knight on forced pilgrimage to Jerusalem who shipwrecks and is forced to fight for his survival and the hand of a beautiful woman.
- The Year of the Horsetails (1967). A celebrated historical novel set on the Eurasian Steppe that follows the exploits of Bardiya, a Saka tribesman who is a fugitive from the dreaded Mongol-like Tugars. He is adopted by the Drevich, a Slav people whom he teaches to fight for their land against the Tugars.
