= Canberra University College =

Australian tertiary education institution

Coordinates: 35.27797°S 149.12372°E

Canberra University College was a tertiary education institution established in Canberra by the Australian government and the University of Melbourne in 1929. At first it operated in the Telopea Park School premises after hours. Most of the initial students were public servants and all were part-timers. After WWII funding for the college was increased significantly.

The college operated until 1960 when it was incorporated into the Australian National University as the School of General Studies. Over the course of its operation it had two directors, Sir Robert Garran from 1930 to 1953 and Bertram Thomas Dickson from 1954 to 1960. It was staffed by many notable academics including economist Heinz Wolfgang Arndt, philosopher Kurt Baier, poet Leslie Allen, historian Manning Clark, political scientist Finlay Crisp and botanist Lindsay Pryor.

== Alumni ==
Notable alumni include:

- Enid Bishop (BA, 1960), librarian
