= Larzac tablet =

Gallo-Roman curse tablet

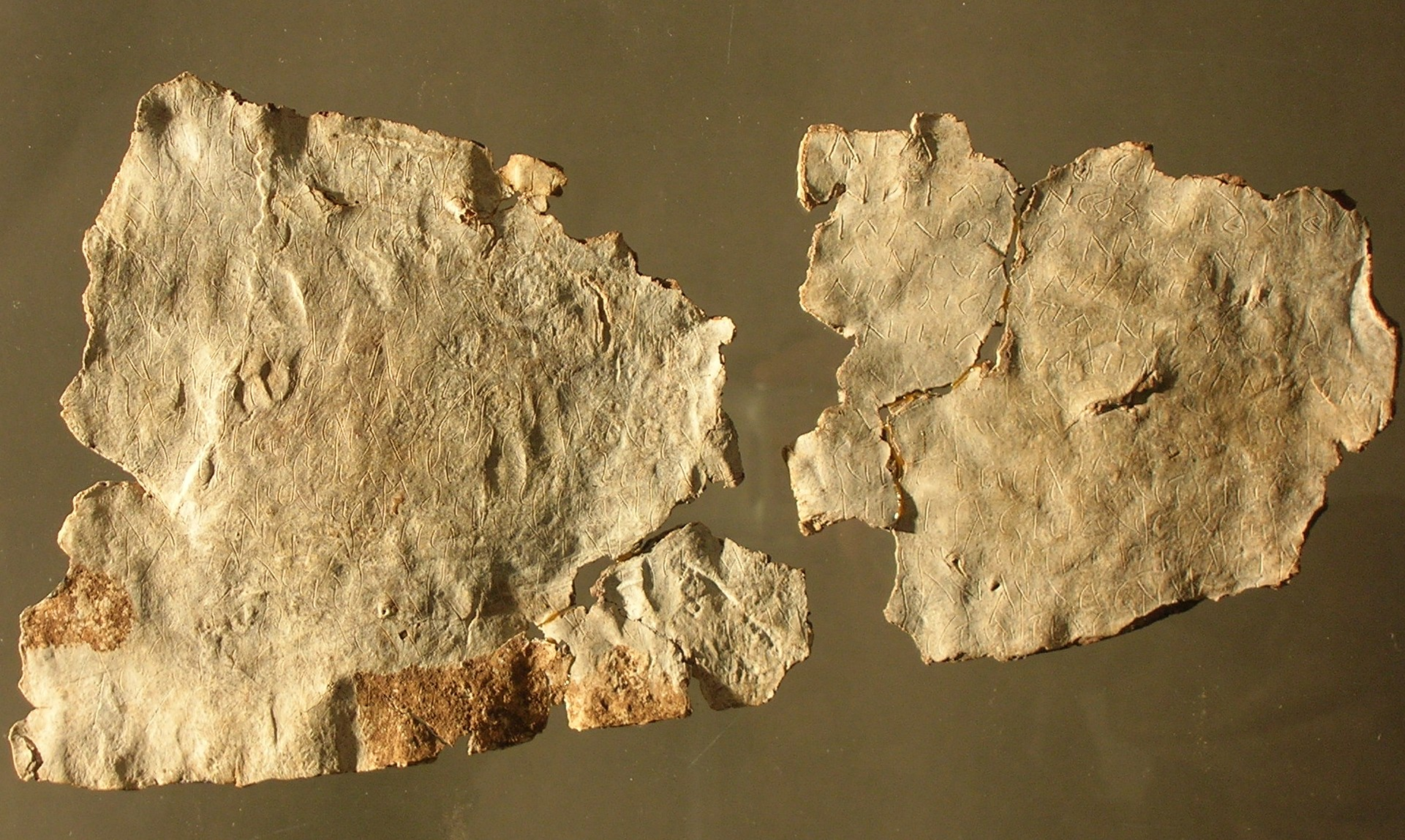

The Larzac tablet is a lead curse tablet found in 1983 in the commune of L'Hospitalet-du-Larzac, Aveyron, southern France. It is now kept in the museum of Millau. It bears one of the most important inscriptions in the Gaulish language.

The inscription is in Roman cursive on a lead tablet preserved in two fragments, dated to about 100 AD. It is the longest preserved Gaulish text, extending to more than 1000 letters or 160 words (an unknown number of lines at the end of the text are lost). The curse tablet was excavated from a grave of La Vayssière necropolis, just north of the village of L'Hospitalet-du-Larzac, close to the ancient Roman road from Condatomagus (Amiliavum, Millau) to Luteva (Lodève), at the time crossing the provincial border between Gallia Aquitania and Gallia Narbonensis.

The text cannot be translated with any certainty, but it is clear that its nature is that of a magical curse, cast in the "world of women", presumably by one group of women or sorceresses against a rival group. The placement of the curse tablet in a tomb is not unusual in the Greco-Roman world; the tomb was considered a gateway by means of which the curse would reach the infernal deities charged with its execution. The fragmentation of the tablet may also be intentional, performed by its original authors, as part of the ritual "burial" of the curse to send it on its way to the underworld. The magic invoked is clearly malicious, of a nature well attested from other parts of the Celtic world, notably Irish mythology. Sisterhoods of sorceresses or witches are also known on the authority of ancient ethnographers to have existed in ancient Gaul; thus, Pomponius Mela (III, 6, 48) records a college of nine priestesses capable of invoking tempests and adopting animal form among the Osismii, while Strabon (IV, 4, 6) is aware of a convent of women of the Samnitae possessed by Dionysus, installed on an island of the Loire estuary.

Both the context of the curse tablet and the names of the women listed as targets of the curse reflect the syncretic culture of Roman Gaul at the end of the 1st century. The name of Severa Tertionicna, the "head witch" targeted by the curse, consists of a Roman cognomen Severa and a patronymic which combines the Roman cognomen Tertio with the Gaulish -ikno- suffix.

== Text ==
The inscription is in two hands, labelled M and N (N being the later, responsible for deleting parts of the original text.) The text of N is preserved in its entirety, on the six first lines on side b of the second fragment; parts of the original text of M have been lost. Robert Marichal identifies M as a "habitual" scribe, perhaps a professional, while the writing of N is inexpert and laborious.

The text contains a curse against one Severa Tertionicna and a group of women, presumably her followers. Adsagsona seems to be the name of the principal goddess invoked for the purposes of the curse. A total of eleven or twelve names of women who were to be cursed alongside Severa Tertionicna have been preserved; most of these are identified by their given name plus a specification of a relation, identified either by one of their parents ("daughter of"), or one of their children ("mother of"), or as dona (of unclear significance, apparently "lady of", but Lambert suggested "wetnurse of" and Lejeune suggested "heiress of"). The list of names is:

1. Bano[na] Flatucias
2. Paulla dona Potiti[us]
3. Aia duχtir Adiegias
4. Potita, m[atir] Paullias
5. Seuera du[χtir] Valentos do(n)a Paulli[us]
6. Adiega matir Aiias
7. Potita dona Primius [...] Abesias
[8. Eiotinios?]
9. Ruficna Casta dona [Ba]nonus
10. Diligentim Vlationicnom
11. Aucitioni(m) materem Potiti
12. Vlatucia mat[ir] Banonias

Some of the women in the list seem to be related to one another; Lejeune suggested that this does not necessarily mean that they are biological mothers and daughters, but that the tablet might instead reveal the structure of the sorceresses' organisation, where an older member would initiate a younger novice, and the two women would be considered "mother" and "daughter" for the purposes of their order. Orel (Studia Celtica 31, 1997) pointed out that dona is always followed by a proper name in -ius, while matir and duχtir are followed by forms in -ias, i.e. genitive singular), suggesting that the -ius may represent the instrumental plural case (< -ōis), indicating clans or families rather than individuals. Based on this hypothesis, Orel makes out five such (magical) "clans" from the list:

A: Rufena Casta (9); daughter Banona (1) and mother Flatucia (12)
B: daughter Aia (3) and mother Adiega (6)
C: Severa (5); daughter Paulla (2), mother Potita (4) and mother's mother Abesa
D: daughter Severa (5), mother Valenta
E: Potita (7); Prima

Inscription text

1a
inside se bnanom bricto[m i- / -n eainom anuana sanander [
na brictom uidlaias uidlu[ / tigontias so adsagsona seue[rim
tertionicnim lidssatim liciatim / eianom uoduiuoderce lunget
..utonid ponc nitixsintor si[es / duscelinatia ineianon anuan[a
esi andernados brictom bano[na / flatucias paulla dona politi[us
iaia duxtir ediagias poti[ta m- / -atir paullias seuera du[xtir
ualentos dona paullius / adiega matir aiias
potita dona prim[ius / abesias
1b
etic eiotinios co et[ic / rufina casta dona[
nonus coetic diligentir soc[ / ulationicnom aucitionim[
aterem potiti ulatucia mat[ / banonias ne incitas biontutu [ue
seuerim licinaue tertioni[cnim / eiabi tiopritom biietutu semit[
retet seuera tertionicna / ne incitas biontutus ... du[
anatia nepi anda.. / ]incors onda...[
]donicon[ / ]incarata
2a
]a senit conectos[ / ]onda bocca nene.[
]rionti onda boca ne[ / .on barnaunom ponc nit-
issintor sies eianepian / digs ne lisantim ne licia-
tim ne rodatim biont- / utu semnanom sagitiont-
ias seuerim lissatim licia- / tim anandognam acolut[
utanit andognam[ / da bocca[ / diom...[ ne[
2b
aia [...] cicena[ / nitianncobueðliðat[
iasuolsonponne / antumnos nepon
nesliciata neosuode / neiauodercos nepon
su biiontutu semn- / anom adsaxs nadoc[
suet petidsiont sies / peti sagitiontias seu-
[er]im tertio lissatim[ / ..]s anandogna [...
...]ictontias.[

== Notes ==
In the first line, the phrase bnanom brictom seems to mean "the magic spells/incantations of women." The first form is Celtic for the widely attested Proto-Indo-European root for "woman", *g^{w}enh_{2} (> Sanskrit janis "a woman," gná "wife of a god, a goddess;" Avestan jainish "wife;" Armenian kin "woman;" Old Irish ben, "woman;" Greek gynē "a woman, a wife;" Old Church Slavonic žena, Old Prussian genna "woman;" Old English cwen "queen, female ruler of a state, woman, wife;" Gothic qino "a woman, wife, qéns "queen"). Here, it is in the genitive plual, from PIE *g^{w}nh_{2}-om, with expected zero grade of the root. The second form, brictom, which occurs three times in 1.b, is probably from Proto-Celtic *brixtu- meaning "magical formula, incantation", whence OIr. bricht (same meaning), Middle Welsh -brith in lled-frith ‘magical charm’, Old Bretton brith (same meaning), and Gaulish brixtia on the Chamalières tablet. The Celtic forms ultimately go back to a Proto-Indo-European root *b^{h}erg^{h}- perhaps originally meaning "to make light" with further cognates in Old Norse bragr "poetic talent", and Sanskrit brahmán- ‘priest’ and bráhman- "prayer."

In the third line of 1.a, the form eianom seems to be the feminine genitive plural pronoun "their."

The form starting with andern- (1.a line 5) seems to indicate "young women", cognate with Middle Irish ander "young woman" and Middle Welsh anneir ‘"heifer."

In 2a (5) and 2b (6), the form an-andogna(m) seems to contain the compound -ando-gna- "born within (the family)," a compound also seen (in the masculine) in the Gaulish personal name Andegenus, and with a slightly different prefix in Old Irish in-gen Ogham ᚔᚅᚔᚌᚓᚅᚐ INIGENA from Proto-Celtic *eni-genā "daughter." What the semantic nuances are between this form and duχtir is unclear, but one presumably is the literal biological meaning, and the other likely expresses the relationship within the community (similar to Father and Brethren in the Catholic church).

Forms shared (through cognates) with Botorrita plaques in the Celtiberian language include tirtanikum (Botorrita III 3.3) versus tertionicnim on line three of 1a and line four of 1b above; and tuate (Botorrita III 2.40) versus duχtir (1.a.6 twice) both likely meaning "daughter."

Mees provides the following reconstruction and translation of the second half of 2b:

suạ biiontutu se mnanom, Adsaxsọna,
doc suet petidsiont sies

peti sagitiontias Seu[er]im Tertio(nicnim),
lissatim [eia]s, anandogna[m br]ictontias

‘So shall they be for this (the enchantment) of these woman, Adsagsona, and so too (su-et) will they have suffered.’

‘Bring suffering on the ones who are persecuting Severa Tertionicna, the diviner of it (i.e. the binding), the stranger of the enchanting!’

== See also ==
- Chamalières tablet
- Bath curse tablets

== Bibliography ==
- Michel Lejeune, Léon Fleuriot, Pierre-Yves Lambert, Robert Marichal, Alain Vernhet, Le plomb magique du Larzac et les sorcières gauloises, C.N.R.S., Paris, 1985, ISBN 2-222-03667-4. reprint in Études celtiques, XXII, pp. 88–177. Archived 2013-10-19 at the Wayback Machine
- Xavier Delamarre, Dictionnaire de la langue gauloise, Paris, Errance, 2003.
- Pierre-Yves Lambert, La langue gauloise, Paris, Errance, 2003.
- F. Melmoth, « Épigraphie gauloise », in: « Parlez-vous Gaulois ? », L'Archéologue, n° 59, 2002, pp. 22–25.
- Bernard Mees, The Women of Larzac, Keltische Forschungen 3, 2008, 169-188 (academia.edu).
