= Bargoin Museum =

Archaeology museum in Clermont-Ferrand, France

- Musée Bargoin
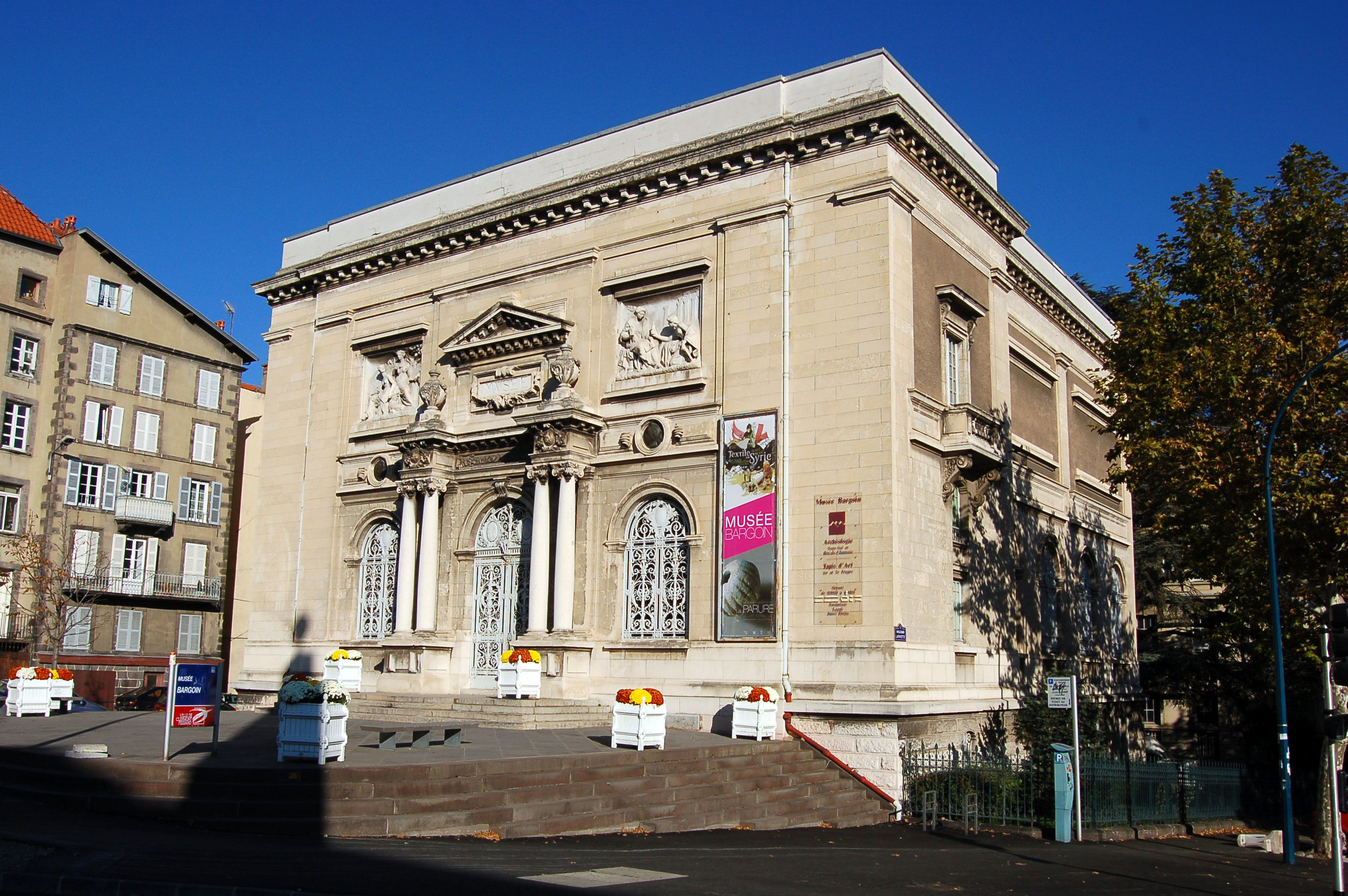
- West facade of the Bargoin museum.
- Established: 1903
- Location: Clermont-Ferrand
- Coordinates: 45°46′26″N 3°05′14″E
- Type: Archaeological museum
- Collections: Archaeology, textiles
- Visitors: 17891 (2019)
- Architect: Joseph Dionnet
- Website: www.clermontmetropole.eu/bouger-se-divertir/le-dynamisme-culturel/les-musees-de-clermont-auvergne-metropole/musee-bargoin/

The Bargoin Museum is a heritage museum in Clermont-Ferrand, in France. It mainly exhibits archaeological collections and textiles.

== Geographical placement ==
The Bargoin Museum is in Clermont-Ferrand, at the intersection of Ballainvilliers street and Lafayette boulevard, near the rectorate, the Jardin Henri-Lecoq and the Henri-Lecoq Museum.

== History ==
The museum is named after Jean-Baptiste Bargoin, a wealthy industrialist from Clermont-Ferrand who in 1885 bequeathed part of his fortune to the city, with the aim of founding a museum.

The building was designed by architect Joseph Dionnet. Its façade is adorned with marble bas-reliefs representing the Arts, by sculptor P. Gray, and railings by ironworker Bernardin.

Designed in the 19th century to showcase fine art collections, the museum has also housed numerous archaeological finds since its inauguration in 1903.

With the relocation of its art collections to the new Roger-Quilliot Art Museum at the end of the 20th century, the Bargoin Museum moved its archaeological collection to larger spaces, reserving the second floor for the "Carpets and Textile Arts" collection.

Long a municipal museum, the Bargoin Museum is now part of the Clermont Auvergne Métropole.

In 2016, on the occasion of the "Rebelles" exhibition, graffiti artists Deft, Beame414, Waro Tkn Fwt, Rino, and Epok from the ENDtoEND collective created a chalk spray painting on the façades of the Bargoin Museum.

== Archaeological collections ==
The first floor is devoted to archaeology, covering the periods of Prehistory, ancient history, and, to a lesser extent, the Middle Ages.

Archaeological collections come mainly from excavations and discoveries made in the Clermont-Ferrand area, and more widely in the Puy-de-Dôme region.

The museum also stores several Roman, Etruscan and Greek objects from the collections of 19th- and 20th-century Clermont-Ferrand scholars, enthusiasts and antique dealers.

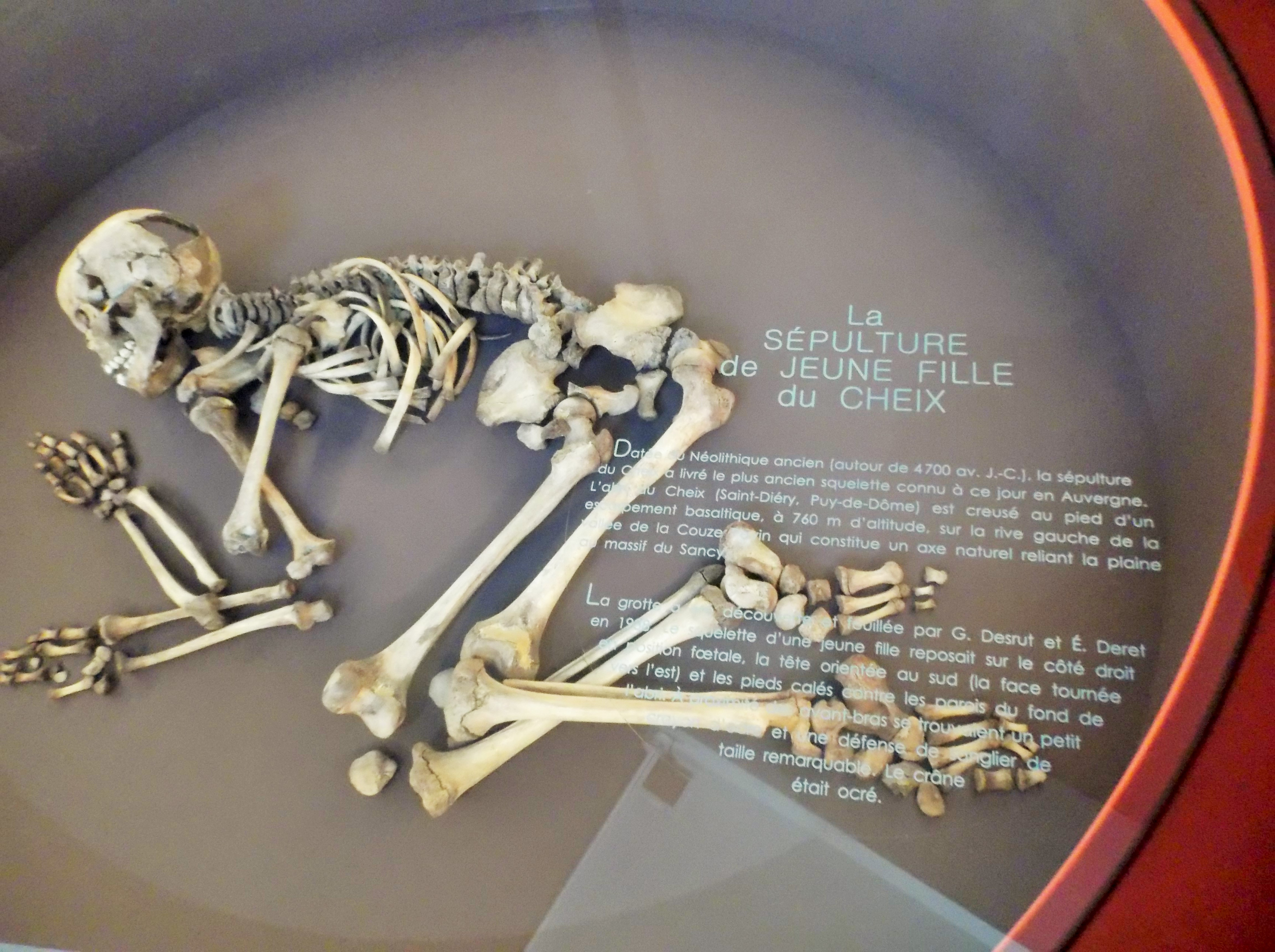
Skeleton of the "young girl of Cheix"

=== Prehistoric and protohistoric collections ===
The museum presents a collection of lithics from excavations at the Durif shelter, a Magdalenian site in Enval (Vic-le-Comte).

A notable item in the prehistoric collections is the "young girl of Cheix", the skeleton of a young girl buried in the fetal position, found in 1938 in the Shelter of Cheix, in Saint-Diéry, and dating from the Early Neolithic. This is the oldest known skeleton in Auvergne.

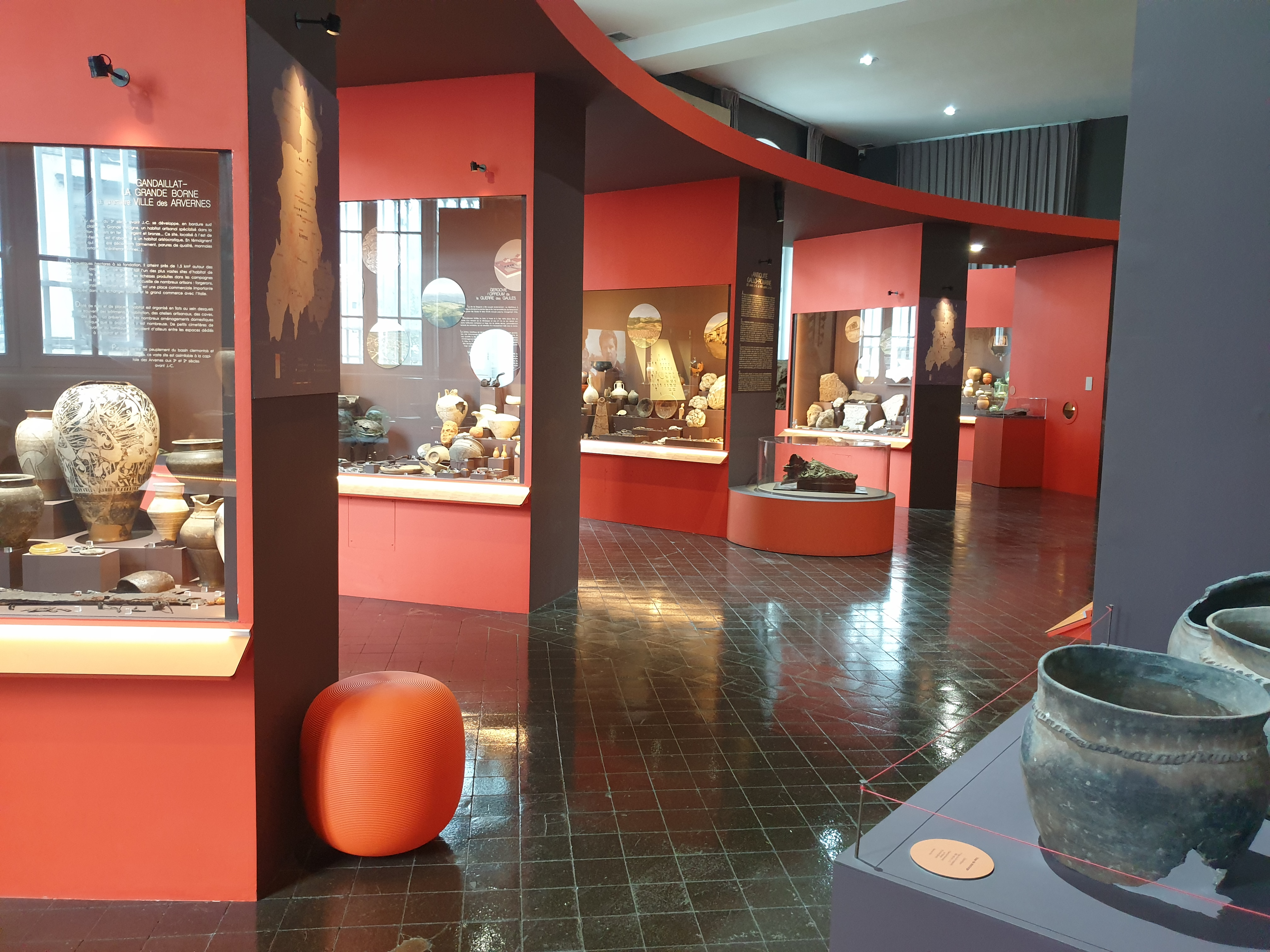
Design of the room devoted to the archaeological collections

For the Bronze Age, the most remarkable collection is the Manson deposit (Saint-Genès-Champanelle), discovered in 1873. It comprises around a hundred bronze objects, including weapons and ornaments.

The museum also holds some rare ceramics with zoomorphic decoration, dating from the 2nd century BC, and probably made locally. These were intended for serving drinks.

Objects from the archaeology section
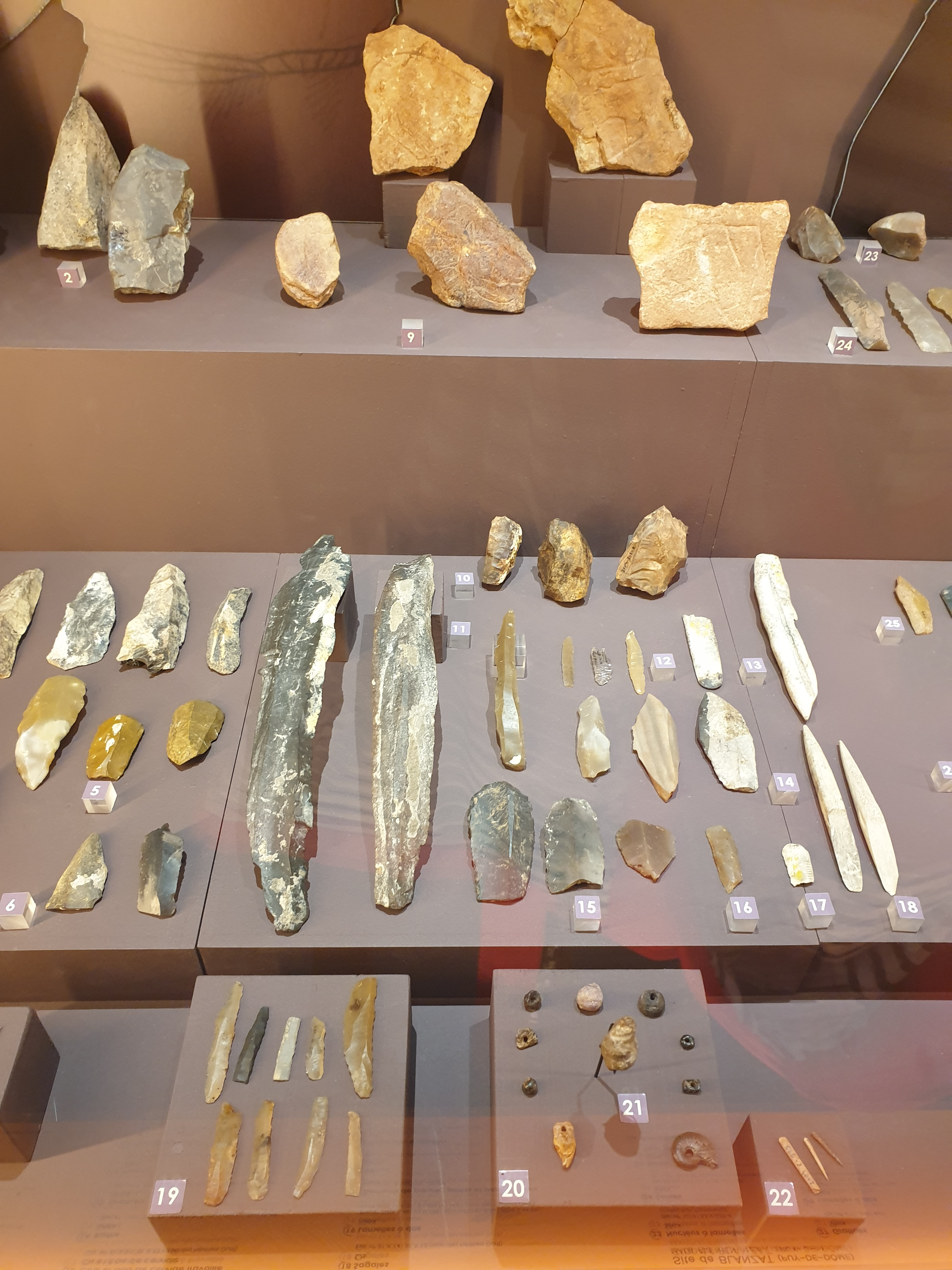
Stone material

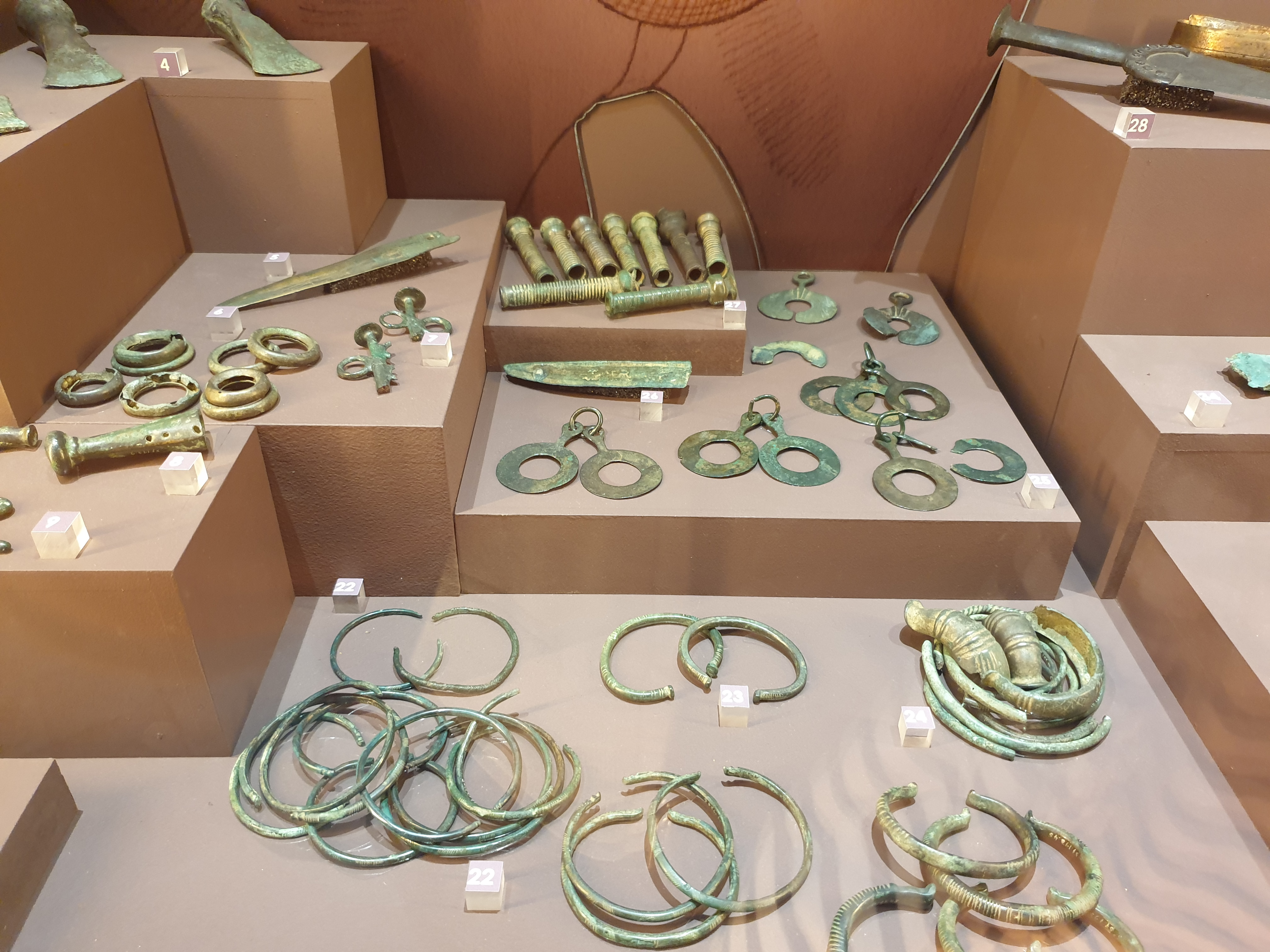
Archaeological material from the Bronze Age

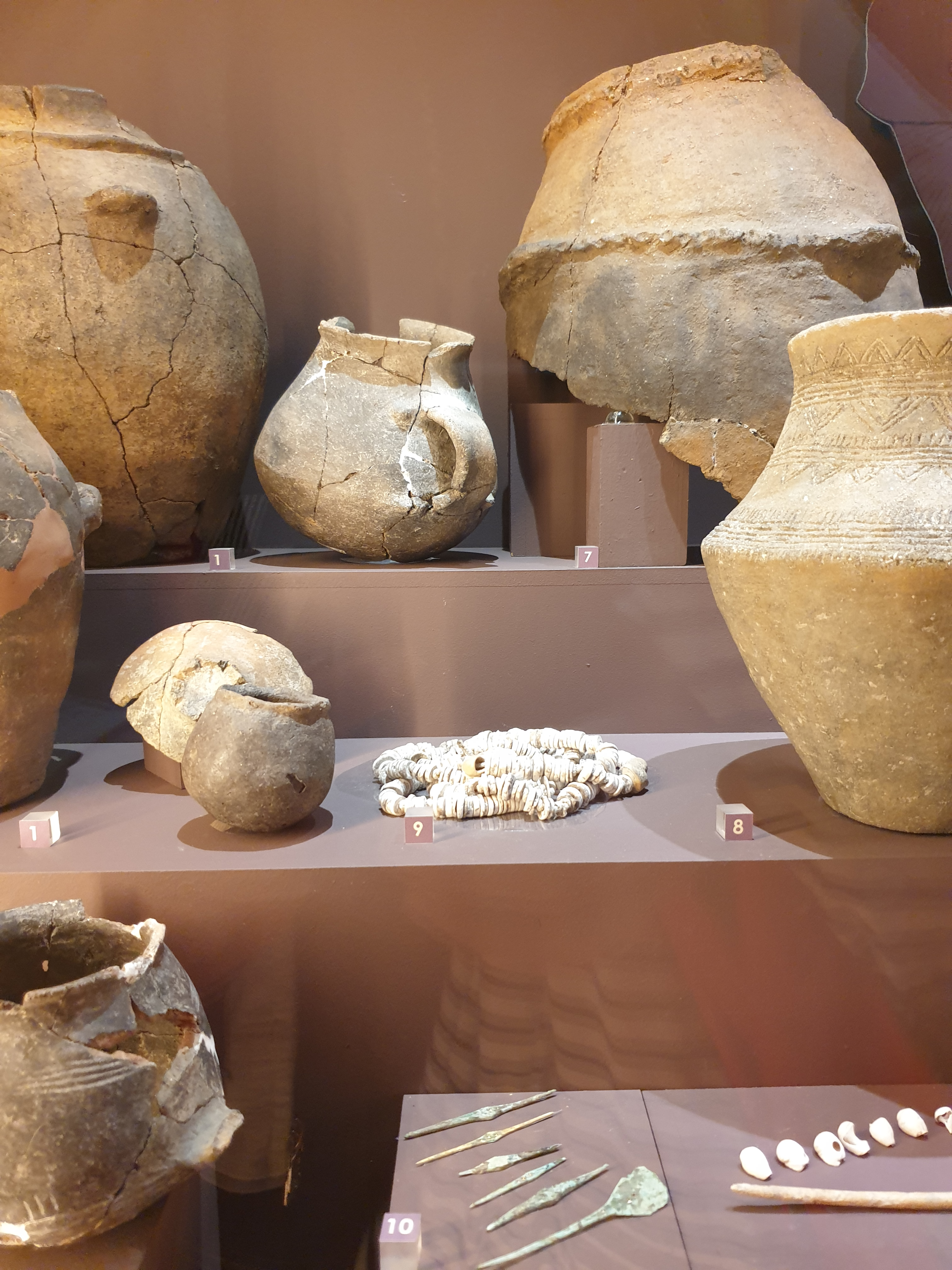
Archaeological objects

=== Gallo-Roman antiquities ===
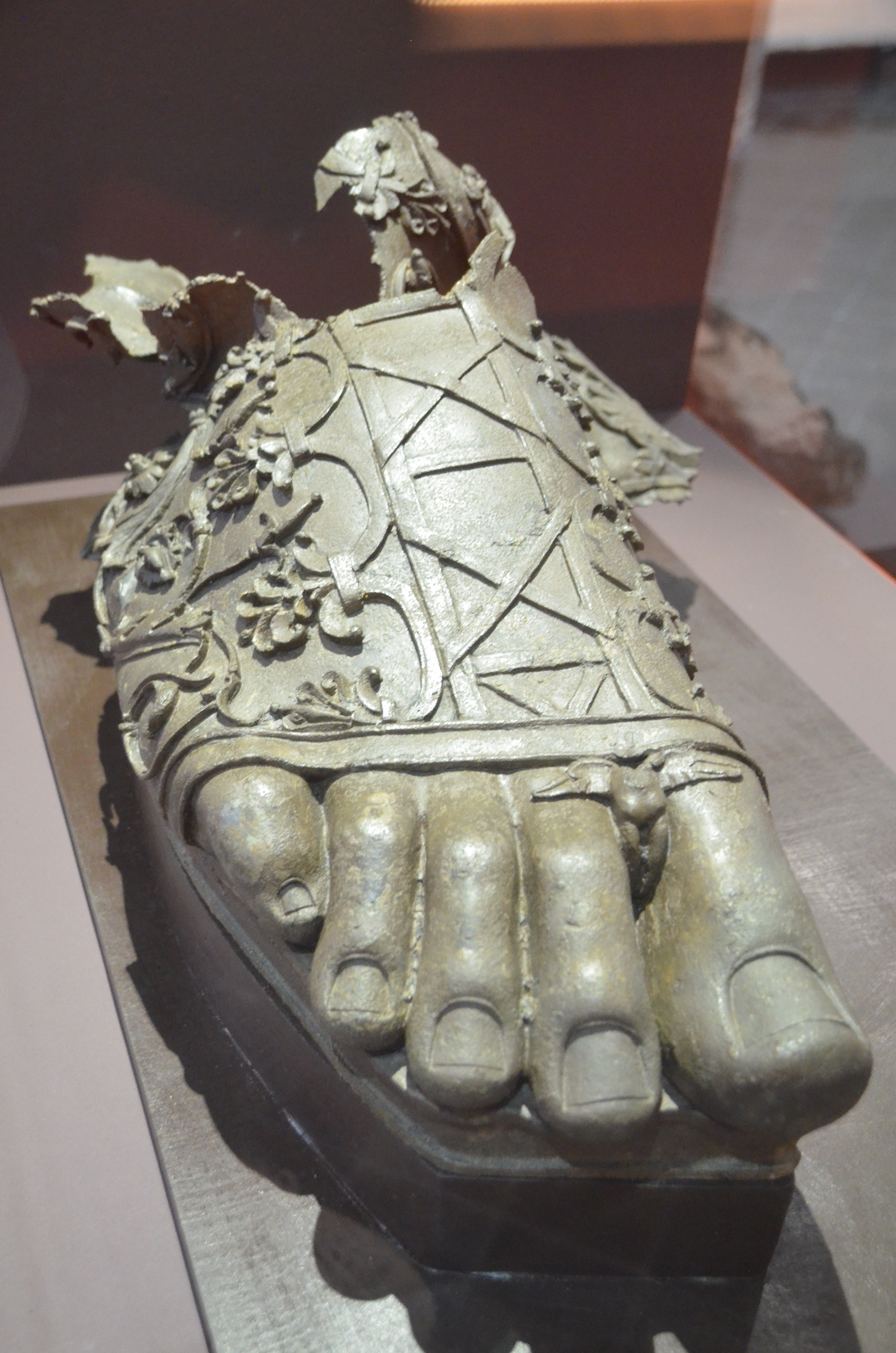
Bronze foot discovered in 2006

The museum is particularly well stocked with Gallo-Roman remains from various local excavations. The Martres-de-Veyre necropolis, excavated in the second half of the 19th century, yielded five tombs in an excellent state of preservation, along with various organic archaeological remains (textiles, leather, human remains).

One of the highlights of the collection is a monumental bronze foot, discovered in 2006 during an archaeological survey on the site of the former Clermont-Ferrand bus station. Unfortunately, subsequent preventive excavations failed to uncover any further elements of this colossal statue, which is estimated to have measured between 2.70 and 3.50 metres and to have required between 400 and 450 kg of metal. It was probably an imperial commission to adorn a public monument in Augustonemetum.

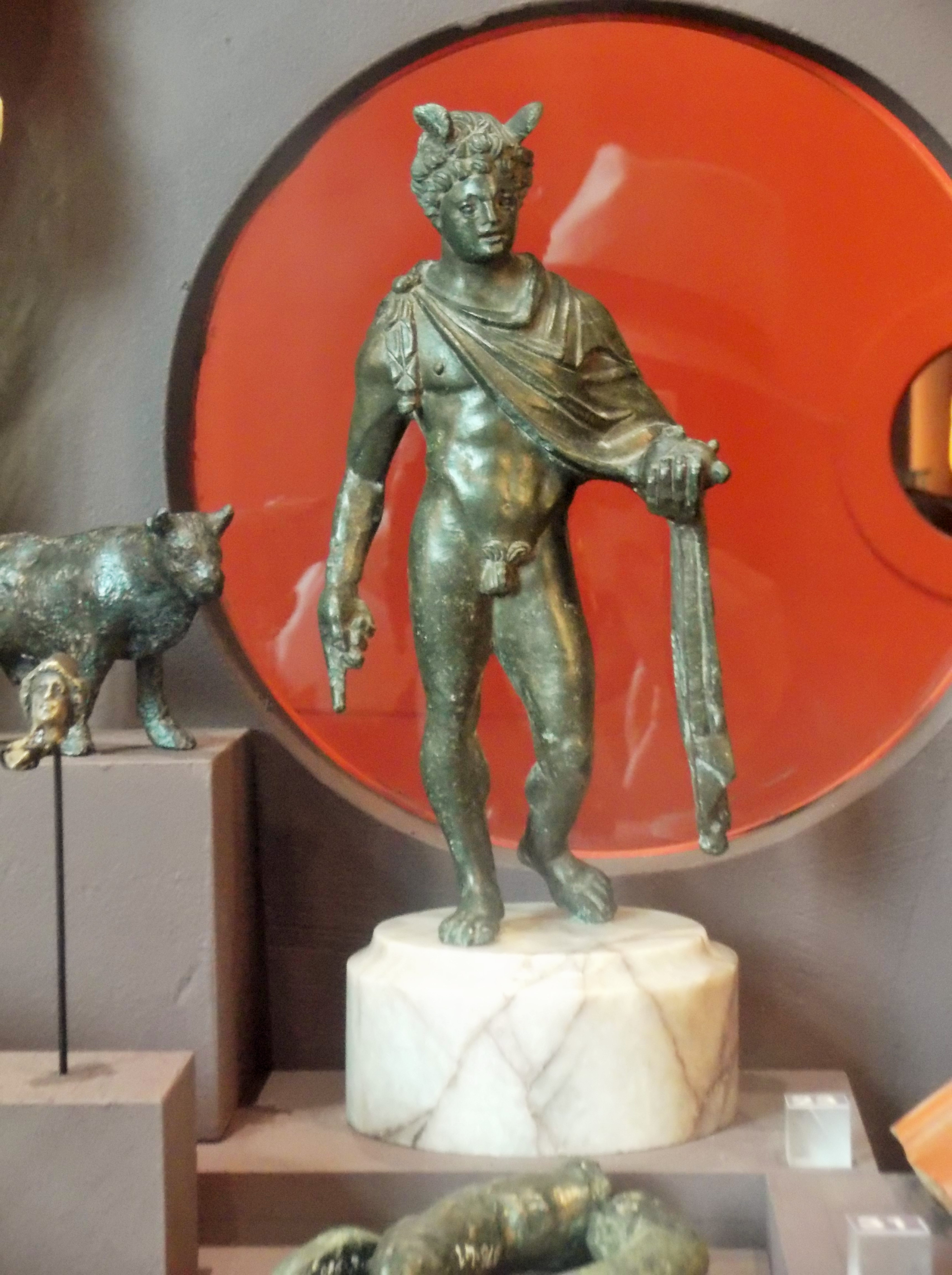
Statuette of the god Mercury from the Temple de Mercure at the summit of the Puy de Dôme

Some of the objects in the Roman collections come from finds made in the ruins of the temple of Mercury at the summit of the Puy de Dôme, uncovered in 1873 during construction of the meteorological observatory. These furnishings date from 120–130 AD.

The Gallo-Roman ex-voto collection at Chamalières' Source des Roches is on display in the basement. The collection comprises 10,000 fragments from around 3,500 wooden ex-votos carved between 30 BC and 100 AD. The collection's diversity and exceptional state of preservation make it a benchmark. A lead tablet discovered on the site is important for studies on the Gaulish language.

Objects from the archaeology section
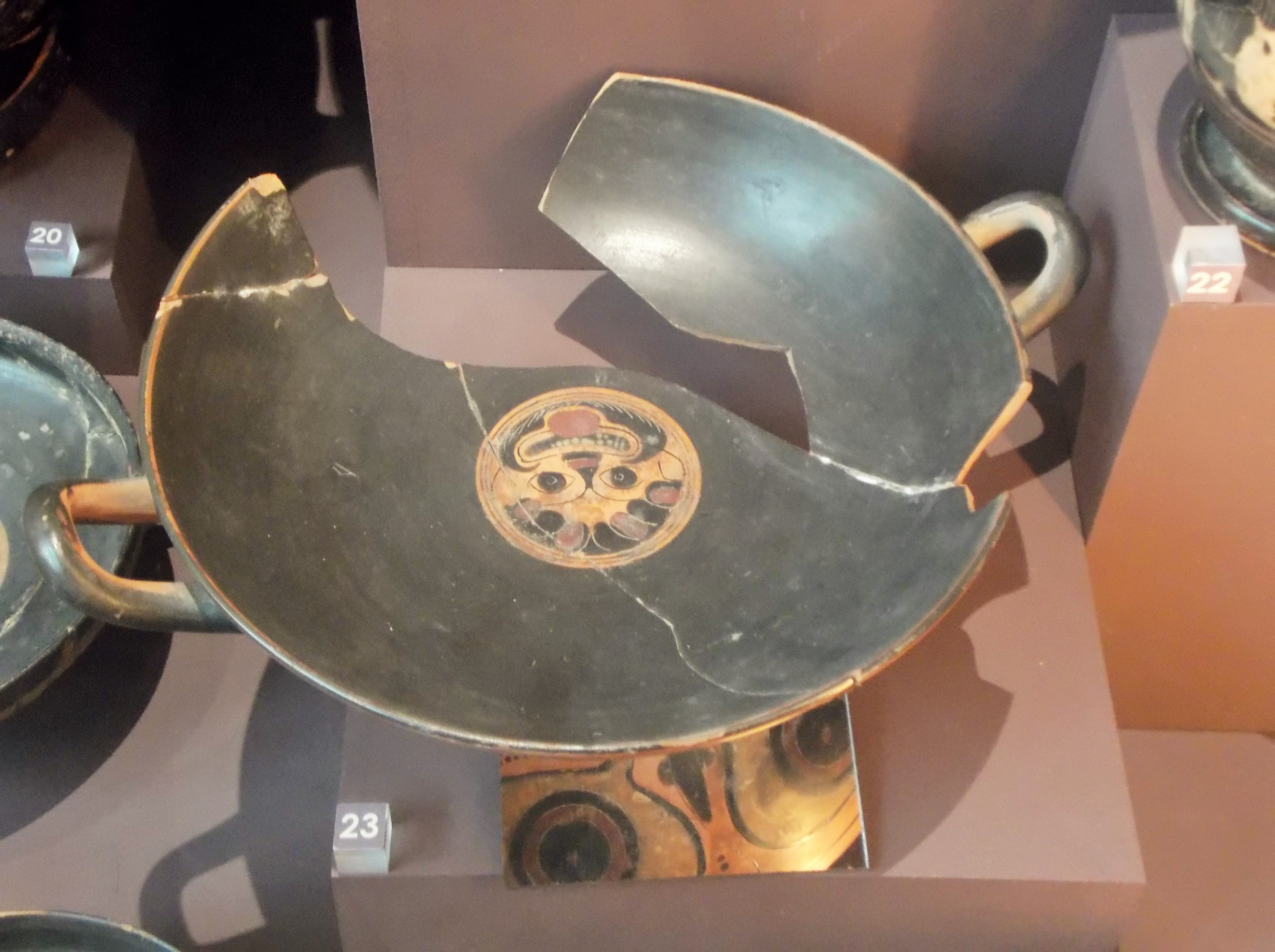
Attic Greek gorgon cup from the Campana collection

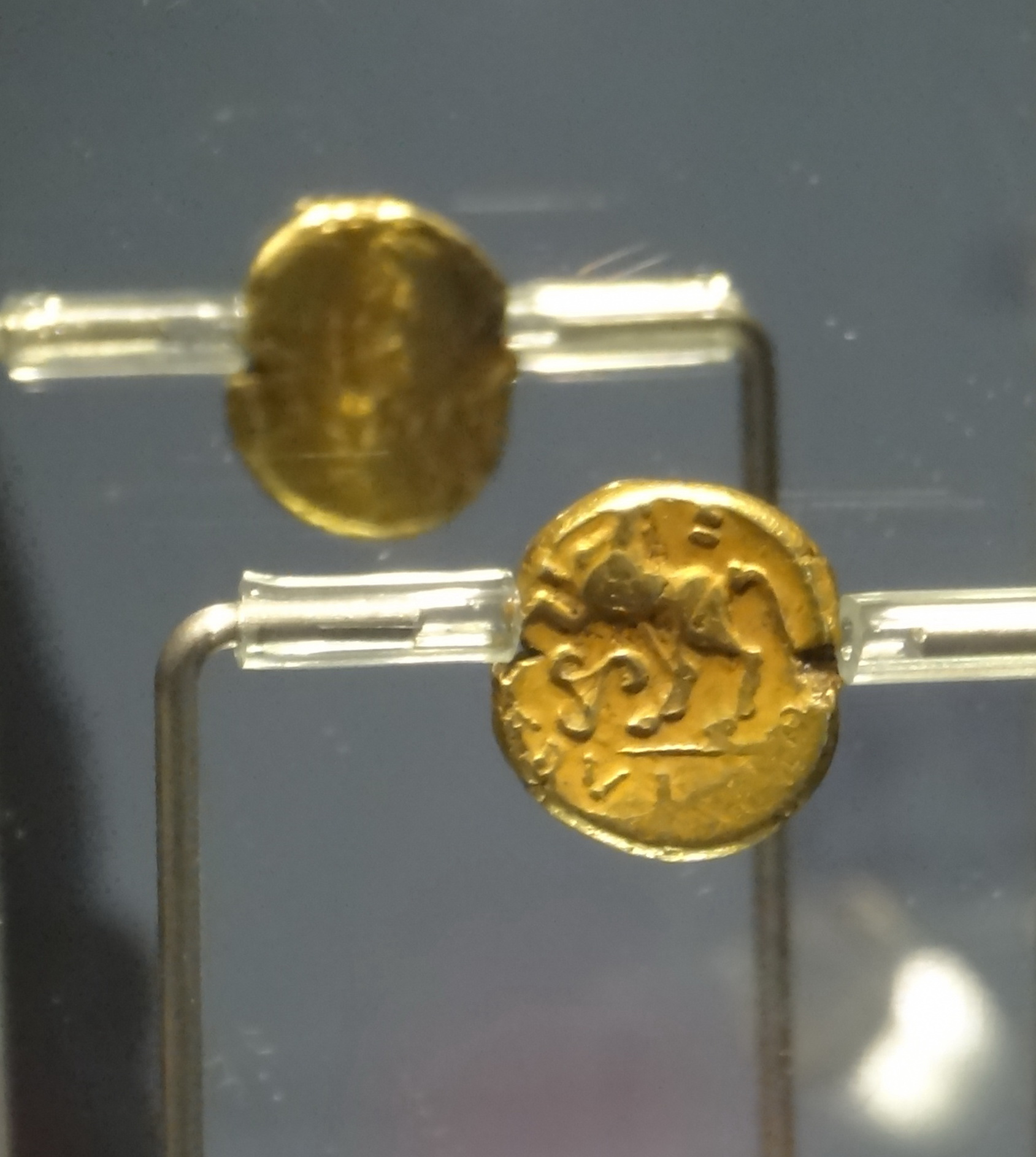
Arverni stater

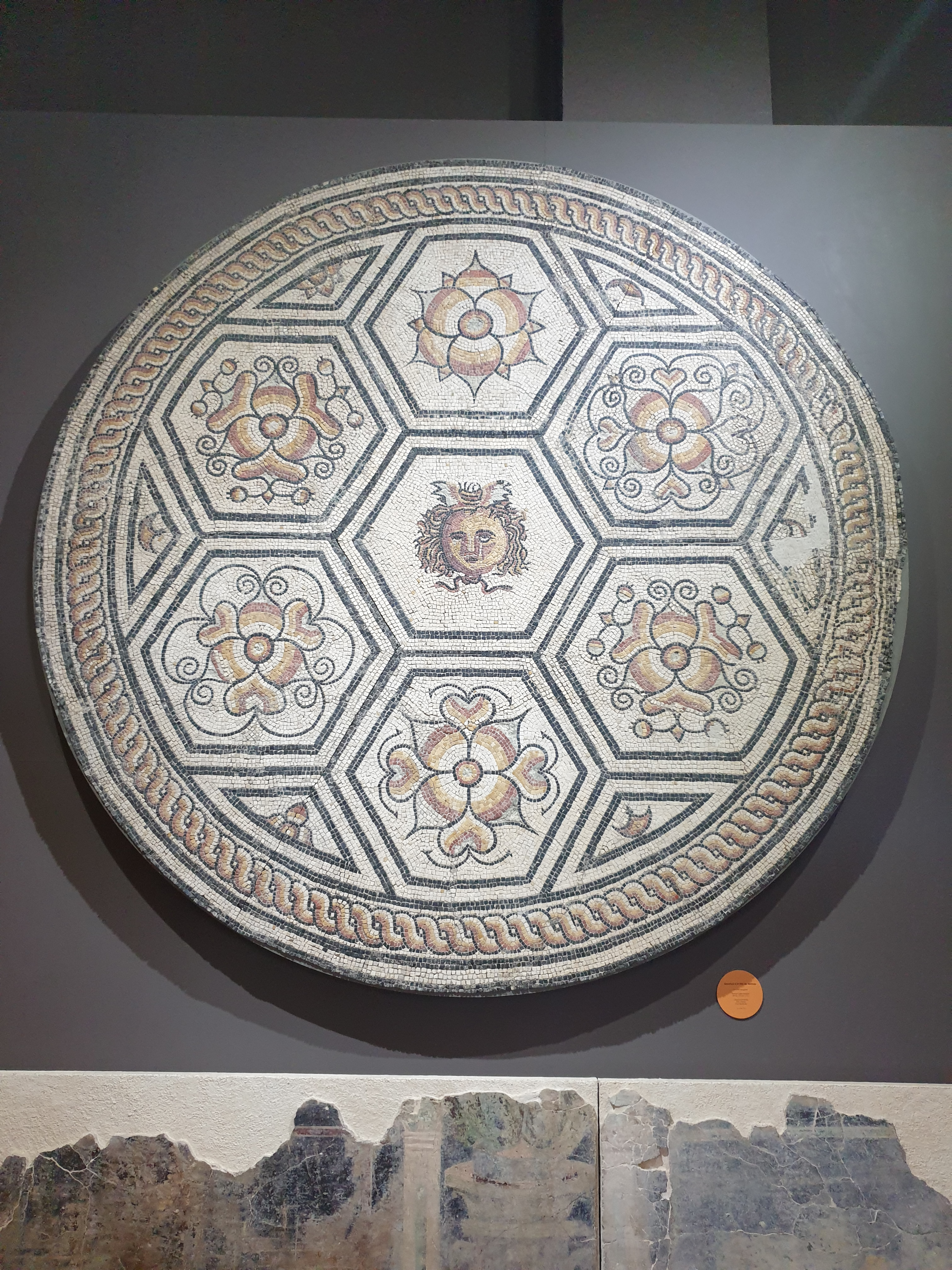
Mosaic with Medusa head

== Textile art collections ==
The two upper floors showcase the museum's textile art collections. From Central Asia to North Africa and Central America, the Bargoin Museum's textile collections explore a wide range of non-European heritage pieces from the 18th to the 21st century. Due to their fragility, these pieces are rotated for exhibition.

Since 2012, the Bargoin Museum has co-produced an exhibition with the HS_Projets association every two years as part of the Festival international des textiles extraordinaires (FITE). An international edition of this exhibition is held in odd-numbered years.

== Exhibitions ==
- "Le temps de la Méridienne. 5000 years of history under the A75 freeway", October 2023 to May 19, 2024.

== Bibliography ==
- Bargoin Museum (2022). Connaissance des Arts [Knowledge in Arts] (in French). Vol. 986. ISBN 9782758011156. ISSN 1242-9198.
- Dumont, Léonard (2022). "Sur les traces du dépôt d'Aliès (Cantal) : à propos d'un lot d'épées à poignée métallique de provenance inconnue au musée Bargoin de Clermont-Ferrand" [Following in the footsteps of the Aliès deposit (Cantal): On a batch of metal-handled swords of unknown provenance in the Musée Bargoin, Clermont-Ferrand]. Bulletin de l'Association pour la Promotion des Recherches sur l'Âge du Bronze (in French) (22): 38–45.
- Projet scientifique et culturel 2014–2018 [Scientific and cultural project 2014–2018] (PDF) (in French). Clermont-Ferrand: Clermont-Ferrand Municipal Council. 2014.

=== Bargoin Museum's publications ===
- L'Égypte de Marcelle Baud, 1890–1987 : l'archéologie au féminin & en dessins : [exposition, Clermont-Ferrand, Musée Bargoin, 7 juillet 2021 – 9 janvier 2022] [The Egypt of Marcelle Baud, 1890–1987: Archaeology in the feminine and in drawings [exhibition, Clermont-Ferrand, Musée Bargoin, July 7, 2021 – January 9, 2022]] (in French). Saint-Pourçain-sur-Sioule: Bleu autour. 2021. ISBN 9782358481922.
- Gaudiat, Jean-Claude (2005). Céramiques grecques, étrusques, italiotes et romaines du Musée d'archéologie Bargoin à Clermont-Ferrand [Greek, Etruscan, Italic and Roman ceramics from the Bargoin Museum of Archaeology, Clermont-Ferrand] (in French). Clermont-Ferrand: Musée d'archéologie Bargoin.
- Fischer, Brigitte; Vergain, Philippe; Amandry, Michel (2000). Les monnaies d'or gauloises [Gallic gold coins] (in French). Clermont-Ferrand: Bargoin Museum.
- Fauduet, Isabelle; Tisserand, Gérard (1982). Les fibules des collections archéologiques du Musée Bargoin [Fibulae from the Bargoin Museum's archaeological collections] (in French). Clermont-Ferrand: Bargoin Museum.
- Boucher, Stéphanie (1977). Bronzes figurés antiques [Antique figurative bronzes] (in French). Clermont-Ferrand: Bargoin Museum.
- Hallopeau, Marie-Laure (1975). Jules Laurens en Auvergne (catalogue d'exposition) [Jules Laurens in Auvergne (exhibition catalog)] (in French). Clermont-Ferrand: Delaunay.
- Supplément du livret du musée de Clermont-Ferrand et Catalogue du musée lapidaire [Supplement to the Clermont-Ferrand museum booklet and Lapidary museum catalog] (in French). Clermont-Ferrand: Mont-Louis. 1864.
- Bouillet, Jean-Baptiste (1861). Musée de Clermont-Ferrand (Puy-de-Dôme) [Clermont-Ferrand Museum (Puy-de-Dôme)] (in French). Clermont-Ferrand: Typographie de Paul Hubler.
