= Enid Bishop =

Australian librarian (born 1925)

Enid Bishop (later Gibson; born 8 May 1925) is an Australian librarian specialising in Asian studies.

== Life and career ==
Born on 8 May 1925 in Melbourne, Enid Bishop is the daughter of Horace Eddy and Lillian Alice (née McKittrick) Bishop. She attended Huntingtower School in Mt Waverly, Victoria, and later moved to Canberra. Bishop held a number of library assistant positions in her early career, including at Australia House, London, Australian News and Information Bureau Reference Library, New York, and National Library of Australia, Canberra. She was Assistant Librarian in the Asian Collection (then called the Oriental Collection) at Canberra University College from 1958 to 1960. She completed a Bachelor of Arts from that institution in 1960, the same year she was awarded a Fulbright Scholarship. She later attended Columbia University, where she was awarded a Master of Science in 1961.

Bishop was a founding member of the International Association of Orientalist Librarians (IAOL), and also of the East Asian Librarians' Group of Australia (EALRGA; now Asian Library Resources of Australia). Throughout her career she published several scholarly articles, both presented at and organised Australian and national conferences, and played a "crucial role in the development of Asian studies librarianship in Australia".

She became the Divisional Head of the Asian Studies Collection at the Australian National University Library, retiring in 1984 after 22 years at ANU. After retiring, Bishop married and is now known as Enid Gibson.

In 2024, the Asian Studies Association of Australia appointed Bishop an honorary life member in recognition of her role in the founding of the ASAA and for her years of leadership and service in the field of Asian Studies librarianship in Australia.
