= Enid Tapsell =

Enid Marguerite Hamilton Tapsell (1903–1975) was a notable New Zealand nurse, community leader, activist, writer, and local politician.

== Biography ==
She was born in Hamilton, Waikato, New Zealand in 1903. Tapsell married into the Te Arawa iwi when she married in 1924 Kouma Te Omeka Whakamutunga Ngaherehere Tapsell (Tapihana). After her marriage, she moved to Maketu and lived there for 30 years, learned Māori language and contributed where she could in the community including with her nursing experience. She was active in advocating for equal rights for Māori. Later she moved to Rotorua and set up the first museum there inside the old Regent Theatre building. She was also instrumental in the move of the museum to the old government bathhouse. In 1962 she moved into politics and was elected to the Rotorua City Council, one of the first two women to be in this position.
